= 2021 Japanese Regional Football Champions League =

Japanese amateur leagues football season

2021 Japanese Regional Champions League
Tournament details
- Country: Japan
- Dates: 12–28 November 2021
- Teams: 12

Final positions
- Champions: Criacao Shinjuku (1st title)
- Runners-up: Ise-Shima

Tournament statistics
- Matches played: 24
- Goals scored: 48 (2 per match)
- Attendance: 5,462 (228 per match)
- Top goal scorer: Sho Aoto (Kyoto) (4 goals)
- All statistics correct as of 29 June 2025.

The 2021 Japanese Regional Football Champions League (全国地域サッカーチャンピオンズリーグ2021) marked the 45th edition of the annually contested tournament for the top teams from their respective Regional Leagues. The competition took place from 12th to 28th of November 2021, in Iwate, Mie, and Hiroshima, with the final round hosted in Tokyo.

== Overview ==
On 6 August 2021, the outline of the tournament was presented by the Japan Football Association (JFA). The quota for the National Adult Soccer Championship, which was cancelled the previous year, has been restored, but from the previous two years in the 2019 tournament, the participation requirements have been partially changed, and the top three teams in each regions highest league in 2021.

The 57th All Japan Adult Soccer Championship, originally planned to take place in Tochigi Prefecture, was cancelled on September 11, 2021, marking the second consecutive year of cancellation. Due to the cancellation of the tournament, the eligibility criteria, and the participation requirements were revised.

== Venue ==
First round

| Group | Venue | Location | Image |
|---|---|---|---|
| A | Asahi Gas Energy Tojin Stadium | Higashiman Town, Mie | |
| B | Iwagin Stadium | Morioka, Iwate | |
| C | Balcom BMW Hiroshima General Grand | Hiroshima, Hiroshima | |

Final round

| Venue | Location | Image |
|---|---|---|
| Ajinomoto Field Nishigaoka | Kita-ku, Tokyo, Tokyo | |

== Participating teams ==
Initially, the top three teams in the top 4 of each regional league (highest league) in 2021 and the top 4 or higher of the 57th All Japan Adult Football Championship were supposed to be eligible to participate, but the tournament itself was cancelled, so the conditions for participating teams were changed on September 11, 2021 (mentioned above)

2021 Location of clubs participating in the 2021 National Regional Football Champions League

1. 2021 Japanese Regional Leagues winners (9 teams)

- Hokkaido: Hokkaido Tokachi Sky Earth (Selected at the top of the table at the time of cancellation due to the cancellation of the league match)
- Tohoku Division 1: Cobaltore Onagawa (Selected as the top player in the first division at the time of cancellation due to the cancellation of the league match)
- Kanto Division 1: Criacao Shinjuku
- Hokushinetsu 1st Division: Fukui United FC
- Tokai Division 1: Fujieda City Hall (Selected as the top player in the first division at the time of cancellation due to the cancellation of the league match)
- Kansai 1st Section: Ococias Kyoto AC
- Chūgoku: Mitsubishi Motors Mizushima FC (Due to the availability of the league schedule, the participating teams were determined based on the annual standings and other "first-round head-to-head results")
- Shikoku: FC Tokushima (Due to the cancellation of the league match, the board of directors selected FC Tokushima, the winner of the 2020 season)
- Kyushu: Okinawa SV

2. Supplement the J.LEAGUE Centennial Vision Club that finished second in each regional league (if there is more than one, priority will be given to the club that is approved as the J.League Centennial Vision Club in the order of the first). In addition, each club will only qualify once under this requirement.)

- Not applicable (Among the Centennial Vision clubs belonging to the regional league, Criacao Shinjuku has already qualified by winning the Kanto Division 1, VONDS Ichihara is in 3rd place in the Kanto 1st Division, Tochigi City FC is in 4th place in the Kanto 1st Division, and Nankatsu SC is in the Kanto 2nd Division, so it does not meet the requirements)

3. If the number of teams is less than 12 under the conditions 1 and 2, the teams that wish to join the JFL among the second-place teams in the regional league will be replenished by a rotating rotation in the order of the number of registered teams for the All Japan Adult Football Federation as of the end of June 2010 (Kanto → Kansai → Kyushu → Tokai → Hokkaido → Chūgoku → Hokushi'netsu → Tohoku → Shikoku)" (so-called "rotation slots"). For year 2021, the order was Tokai → Hokkaido → Chūgoku → Hokushi'netsu.

- Tokai Division 1 second place: FC Ise-Shima (Selected in 2nd place in the 1st division at the time of discontinuation due to the cancellation of the league match)
- 2nd place in Chūgoku: Baleine Shimonoseki (due to the availability of the league schedule, the participating teams will be determined based on the annual standings and another "first-round head-to-head record")
- Hokushi'netsu Division 1 2nd Place: Artista Asama
  - Norbritz Hokkaido, the second-ranked team in Hokkaido, did not participate because they did not express their desire to join the JFL (no rotation quota was applied).

4. If twelve teams do not reach twelve under the conditions 1 to 3, the participating teams will be decided after a ruling by the All-Japan Adult Football Federation.

- Not applicable (because we reached 12 teams under the aforementioned conditions).

== Match format ==
Based on the tournament guidelines announced by the JFA.

- In the first round, the twelve participating teams will be divided into three groups of four teams each to play a first-round robin league match. A total of four teams, which includes the three first-place teams in each group and the top-performing team from the second-place finishers in each group, will advance to the final round. In the final round, four teams will play in a single round robin league.
- The draw was held on 16 October 2021 at the Japan Football Association Building (JFA House) in the following manner and streamed on the official YouTube channel of the Kansai Football League. In addition, the representative of each team is usually in the lottery, but the representative of the Chugoku region and the third representative of the rotation slot were not decided at the time of the lottery day. The secretariat of the Chugoku Adult Soccer League participated in the lottery on behalf of the team.

1. Three of the regional league champions are in a region that includes first-round venues, (Iwasta: Cobaltore Onagawa, Asasta: Fujieda City Hall, Balcom Hiroshima: No. 1 in Chugoku. For the sake of convenience, we will refer to them as "Group 1"), the other six regional league winners (the "second group"), and the three teams that will compete in the rotating bracket (FC Ise-Shima, Artista Asama, Chugoku or Tohoku 2nd place. The third group will be distributed. As a result, it is predetermined that the teams in the first and third groups will not be in the same group.

2. Prepare "Pot 1" and "Pot 3" with one ball with the group name (A, B, C) and "Pot 2" with two balls each, three types of "Pot A, B, C" with balls with the position number (A-1 - C-4) for each group, and a "lottery box" with numbers 1 to 4.

- The competition has three groups (A, B, C) for the first round.
  - Teams are split into three tiers based on their regional performance:
    - "Group 1": Regional champions from the host areas.
    - "Group 2": Remaining regional league winners.
    - "Group 3": Teams selected via rotational slots.

3. The three teams in the first group will draw "Pot 1" and the corresponding "Pot A, B, and C" will be drawn to link the group to the venue of the first round and determine the position of each team.

- Pot 1 & Pot 3: Each contains one ball labelled "A", "B", or "C" to assign teams to groups.
- Pot 2: Has two balls per group for position numbers (like A-1 to C-4). Each "Pot A", "Pot B", and "Pot C" includes these position balls.
- Lottery Box (1–4): Used to assign the finishing positions in the final round or to place wildcards after first-round draws.

4. The six teams in the second group will draw "Pot 2" and the corresponding "Pot A, B, and C" to determine the position of each team.

5. Finally, the three teams in the third group will draw "Pot 3" to determine the position of each team. In this case, the possibility of being in the same group as a team from the same regional league is not taken into account.

- The matches will be played in 45-minute halves with no extra time or penalty shootouts.
- In both the first round and the final round, points will be awarded for each match (win in 90 minutes = 3, draw = 1, loss in 90 minutes = 0). The ranking will be determined by the cumulative points won in the three matches. If there are teams tied on points, then the following criteria will be used.
- Goal difference
- Total number of goals scored
- The head-to-head record between the teams concerned
- If there is still no difference, a draw will be held.

== Match schedule ==
The draw was held on 16 October 2021.

=== First round ===
The first round was played behind closed doors.

=== Group A ===
| Pos | Team | Pld | W | D | L | GF | GA | GD | Pts | Qualification |
|---|---|---|---|---|---|---|---|---|---|---|
| 1 | FC Ise-Shima (Q) | 3 | 2 | 1 | 0 | 4 | 0 | +4 | 7 | Advanced to the Final round |
| 2 | Okinawa SV | 3 | 1 | 2 | 0 | 5 | 1 | +4 | 5 | |
| 3 | Fukui United | 3 | 1 | 1 | 1 | 4 | 3 | +1 | 4 | |
| 4 | Fujieda City Hall | 3 | 0 | 0 | 3 | 0 | 9 | −9 | 0 | |

Source: JFA
(Q) Qualified for the phase indicated

12 November 2021
10:45

| Okinawa SV | 0 - 0 | FC Ise-Shima |
|---|---|---|
| | Match report |

Asahi Gas Energy Tojin Stadium
Referee: Masakazu Kato

12 November 2021
13:30

| Fukui United | 3 - 0 | Fujieda City Hall |
|---|---|---|
| Iwata 5'; Ganaha 34'; Kenshiro 90+2' | Match report |

Asahi Gas Energy Tojin Stadium
Referee: Takasaki Koji

13 November 2021
10:45

| Okinawa SV | 1 - 1 | Fukui United |
|---|---|---|
| Akagi 41' | Match report | Ishikawa 90+3' |

Asahi Gas Energy Tojin Stadium
Referee: Masashi Harada

13 November 2021
13:30

| FC Ise-Shima | 2 - 0 | Fujieda City Hall |
|---|---|---|
| Nishiguchi 28'; Fukuya 55' | Match report |

Asahi Gas Energy Tojin Stadium
Referee: Ken Tsukahara

14 November 2021
10:45

| Okinawa SV | 4 - 0 | Fujieda City Hall |
|---|---|---|
| Fujisawa 14'; Takahara 45+2'; OG 81'; Akagi 90+3' | Match report |

Asahi Gas Energy Tojin Stadium
Referee: Masashi Harada

14 November 2021
13:30

| FC Ise-Shima | 2 - 0 | Fukui United |
|---|---|---|
| Taniguchi 32', 78' | Match report |

Asahi Gas Energy Tojin Stadium
Referee: Ken Tsukahara

=== Group B ===
| Pos | Team | Pld | W | D | L | GF | GA | GD | Pts | Qualification |
|---|---|---|---|---|---|---|---|---|---|---|
| 1 | Ococias Kyoto (Q) | 3 | 3 | 0 | 0 | 6 | 2 | +4 | 9 | Advanced to the Final round |
| 2 | Criacao Shinjuku (Q) | 3 | 2 | 0 | 1 | 8 | 5 | +3 | 6 | Advanced to the Final round |
| 3 | Cobaltore Onagawa | 3 | 1 | 0 | 2 | 2 | 3 | −1 | 3 | |
| 4 | Baleine Shimonoseki | 3 | 0 | 0 | 3 | 1 | 7 | −6 | 0 | |

Source: JFA
(Q) Qualified for the phase indicated

12 November 2021
10:45

| Cobaltore Onagawa | 0 - 1 | Criacao Shinjuku |
|---|---|---|
| | Match report | Nukina 69' |

Iwagin Stadium
Attendance: 0
Referee: Kiminori Yasukawa

12 November 2021
13:30

| Criacao Shinjuku | 4 - 1 | Baleine Shimonoseki |
|---|---|---|
| Yonehara 32'; Ito 35'; Tatsuya 84'; Okamoto 90+5' | Match report | Shimode 62' |

Iwagin Stadium
Attendance: 0
Referee: Taku Hase

13 November 2021
10:45

| Cobaltore Onagawa | 1 - 2 | Criacao Shinjuku |
|---|---|---|
| Ryota 83' (PK) | Match report | Otani 28'; Ikeya 61' |

Iwagin Stadium
Attendance: 0
Referee: Hitoshi Munakata

13 November 2021
13:30

| Ococias Kyoto | 2 - 0 | Baleine Shimonoseki |
|---|---|---|
| Omoto 67'; Ibrahim 90+6' | Match report |

Iwagin Stadium
Attendance: 0
Referee: Taku Hase

14 November 2021
10:45

| Cobaltore Onagawa | 1 - 0 | Baleine Shimonoseki |
|---|---|---|
| Noguchi 70' | Match report |

Iwagin Stadium
Attendance: 0
Referee: Kiminori Yasukawa

14 November 2021
13:30

| Ococias Kyoto | 3 - 2 | Criacao Shinjuku |
|---|---|---|
| Aoto 32', 78', 90+3' | Match report | Owada 57'; Okano 83' |

Iwagin Stadium
Attendance: 0
Referee: Toshiki Tomomasa

=== Group C ===
| Pos | Team | Pld | W | D | L | GF | GA | GD | Pts | Qualification |
|---|---|---|---|---|---|---|---|---|---|---|
| 1 | FC Tokushima (Q) | 3 | 2 | 1 | 0 | 4 | 2 | +2 | 7 | Advanced to the Final round |
| 2 | Artista Asama | 3 | 1 | 1 | 1 | 3 | 2 | +1 | 4 | |
| 3 | Hokkaido Tokachi Sky Earth | 3 | 0 | 2 | 1 | 1 | 2 | −1 | 2 | |
| 4 | Mitsubishi Mizushima | 3 | 0 | 2 | 1 | 3 | 5 | −2 | 2 | |

Source: JFA
(Q) Qualified for the phase indicated

12 November 2021
10:45

| FC Tokushima | 1 - 1 | Mitsubishi Mizushima |
|---|---|---|
| Matsumoto 85' (PK) | Match report | Yamabe 13' |

Balcom BMW Hiroshima Grand
Attendance: 0
Referee: Kazuki Nakamura

12 November 2021
13:30

| Artista Asama | 0 - 0 | Hokkaido Tokachi Sky Earth |
|---|---|---|
| | Match report |

Balcom BMW Hiroshima Grand
Attendance: 0
Referee: Shinji Morikazu

13 November 2021
10:45

| FC Tokushima | 2 - 1 | Artista Asama |
|---|---|---|
| Saride 67'; Ishikawa 76' | Match report | Nakajima 70' |

Balcom BMW Hiroshima Grand
Attendance: 0
Referee: Tomoki Umeda

13 November 2021
13:30

| Mitsubishi Mizushima | 1 - 1 | Hokkaido Tokachi Sky Earth |
|---|---|---|
| Miyazawa 67' | Match report | Nawa 45' |

Balcom BMW Hiroshima Grand
Attendance: 0
Referee: Hiroki Tanabe

14 November 2021
10:45

| FC Tokushima | 1 - 0 | Hokkaido Tokachi Sky Earth |
|---|---|---|
| Saki 25' | Match report |

Balcom BMW Hiroshima Grand
Attendance: 0
Referee: Shinji Morikazu

14 November 2021
13:30

| Mitsubishi Mizushima | 1 - 3 | Artista Asama |
|---|---|---|
| Takase 45+1' | Match report | Okamoto 4', 77'; Kobayashi 17' |

Balcom BMW Hiroshima Grand
Attendance: 0
Referee: Hiroki Tanabe

=== Ranking of second-placed teams ===
The three winners of each group of the first round qualified for the final round, alongside the best-placed team among the runners-up of each group.

| Pos | Team | Pld | W | D | L | GF | GA | GD | Pts | Qualification |
|---|---|---|---|---|---|---|---|---|---|---|
| 1 | Criacao Shinjuku (Q) | 3 | 2 | 0 | 1 | 8 | 5 | +3 | 6 | Qualification for the final round |
| 2 | Okinawa SV | 3 | 1 | 2 | 0 | 5 | 1 | +4 | 5 | |
| 3 | Artista Asama | 3 | 1 | 1 | 1 | 3 | 2 | +1 | 4 | |

Source: JFA
(Q) Qualified for the phase indicated

=== Final round ===
| Pos | Team | Pld | W | D | L | GF | GA | GD | Pts | Qualification |
|---|---|---|---|---|---|---|---|---|---|---|
| 1 | Criacao Shinjuku (C, P, Q) | 3 | 2 | 1 | 0 | 3 | 1 | +2 | 7 | Advanced to the Playoff match and promoted |
| 2 | FC Ise-Shima (Q) | 3 | 1 | 2 | 0 | 1 | 0 | +1 | 5 | Advanced to the Playoff match and lost match |
| 3 | Ococias Kyoto | 3 | 1 | 1 | 1 | 2 | 1 | +1 | 4 | |
| 4 | FC Tokushima | 3 | 0 | 0 | 3 | 1 | 5 | −4 | 0 | |

Source: JFA
(C) Champions; (P) Promoted; (Q) Qualified for the phase indicated

24 November 2021
10:45

| FC Tokushima | 0 - 1 | FC Ise-Shima |
|---|---|---|
| | Match report | Nakata 8' |

Ajinomoto Field Nishigaoka
Attendance: 345
Referee: Nozomi Tawara

24 November 2021
13:30

| Ococias Kyoto | 0 - 1 | Criacao Shinjuku |
|---|---|---|
| | Match report | Higuchi 85' |

Ajinomoto Field Nishigaoka
Attendance: 730
Referee: Takasaki Kochi

26 November 2021
10:45

| FC Tokushima | 0 - 2 | Ococias Kyoto |
|---|---|---|
| | Match report | Ryuseki 75'; Aoto 90+2' |

Ajinomoto Field Nishigaoka
Attendance: 398
Referee: Masakazu Kato

26 November 2021
13:30

| FC Ise-Shima | 0 - 0 | Criacao Shinjuku |
|---|---|---|
| | Match report |

Ajinomoto Field Nishigaoka
Attendance: 1,151
Referee: Takamasa Funahashi

28 November 2021
10:45

| FC Tokushima | 1 - 2 | Criacao Shinjuku |
|---|---|---|
| Akizuki 19' | Match report | Otani 48'; Segawa 66' |

Ajinomoto Field Nishigaoka
Attendance: 1,650
Referee: Takahito Seta

28 November 2021
13:30

| FC Ise-Shima | 0 - 0 | Ococias Kyoto |
|---|---|---|
| | Match report |

Ajinomoto Field Nishigaoka
Attendance: 1,188
Referee: Yoshihito Hori

== Final result ==
- 1. Criacao Shinjuku - Participated in the replacement match (vs JFL 17th)
- 2. Ise-Shima - Participated in the replacement match (vs JFL 16th)
- 3. Ococias Kyoto
- 4. FC Tokushima

== JFL playoff games ==
Promotion and relegation based on results of JFL playoff matches.

18 December 2021
13:00

| Honda Lock | 3 - 2 | FC Ise-Shima |
|---|---|---|
| Tamaki 8'; Mera 11'; Takahashi 29' | Match report | Uematsu 84'; Nakata 87' |

Nobeoka City Nishishina Sports Park Athletic Stadium
Attendance: 400
Referee: Yoshihito Hori
- Honda Lock stayed in the Japan Football League by winning 3-2 against FC Ise-Shima.

18 December 2021
13:00

| FC Kariya | 0 - 4 | Criacao Shinjuku |
|---|---|---|
| | Match report | Ikeya 45+2'; Izutsu 45+4'; Otani 78'; Harada 85' |

Nagoya City Port Soccer Stadium
Attendance: 1,032
Referee: Koji Takasaki
- Criacao Shinjuku was promoted to the Japan Football League for the 2022 season by beating FC Kariya 0-4. FC Kariya was relegated to the Tōkai Adult Soccer League.
