= 2026 Japanese Regional Leagues =

Japanese amateur leagues football season

Japanese Regional Leagues
- Season: 2026

The 2026 Japanese Regional Leagues (Japanese: 2026 地域リーグ, Hepburn: 2026 Chiiki Rīgu) is the 61st edition of the Japanese Regional Leagues, which comprises the fifth and sixth tier of the Japanese football league system. The winners of the first division of each Regional League, along with the three best-placed teams of the Shakaijin Cup, will qualify for the 2026 Regional Champions League, competing for a spot in the 2027–28 JFL. Currently, no changes were publicly presented from the 2025 format of JFL promotion.

== Champions list ==
Region	Champions
Hokkaidō	ASC Hokkaidō (ja)
Tohoku	Cobaltore Onagawa
Kantō	Tokyo United
Hokushin'etsu	Fukui United
Tōkai	Gakunan F. Mosuperio (ja)
Kansai	FC Basara Hyogo (ja)
Chūgoku	Fukuyama City
Shikoku	SONIO Takamatsu (ja)
Kyushu	Veroskronos Tsuno

== Regional League Standings ==
=== Hokkaidō ===
Pos	Team	Pld	W	D	L	GF	GA	GD	Pts	Qualification or relegation
1	ASC Hokkaidō (ja) (C, Q)	14	13	1	0	50	4	+46	40	Qualified for the 2026 Regional Champions League
2	Hokkaido Tokachi Sky Earth	14	12	1	1	58	6	+52	37	
3	BTOP Hokkaidō	14	8	0	6	42	19	+23	24	
4	Norbritz Hokkaido	14	6	1	7	27	28	−1	19	
5	Sapporo FC (ja)	14	4	1	9	11	37	−26	13	
6	Sapporo University Goal Plunderers (ja)	14	4	1	9	13	42	−29	13	
7	Hokushukai Iwamizawa (ja)	14	2	3	9	19	55	−36	9	Qualified to Block League Playoff
8	Sabas FC (R)	14	2	2	10	15	44	−29	8	Relegated to Sapporo Central Block League

Updated to match(es) played on September 20 2026. Source: October 3 2026 日本サッカー情報 Gen
- From this year, the 7th placed team will now qualify for the Block league finals instead of automatic relegation.
  Rules for classification: 1) Points; 2) Goal difference; 3) Goals scored 4) Head-to-head points 5) Head-to-head goal difference 6) Head-to-head
  (C) Champions; (Q) Qualified for the phase indicated; (R) Relegated

==== Hokkaidō Results ====
Home \ Away	ASC Hokkaidō (ASC)	BTK	Hokushukai Iwamizawa (HOK)	HTS	NOR	Sapporo FC (SAP)	SAB	Sapporo University Goal Plunderers (SGP)
ASC Hokkaidō (ja)		3–0	6–2	1–1	2–0	13/09	3–0	3–0
BTOP Hokkaidō	0–1		4–2	20/09	1–2	9–0	30/08	06/09
Hokushukai Iwamizawa (ja)	1–5	0–6		30/08	20/09	1–1	1–1	3–0
Hokkaidō Tokachi Sky Earth	06/09	2–1	6–0		4–0	3–0	6–2	13/09
Norbritz Hokkaidō	0–3	13/09	1–2	0–2		30/08	06/09	3–3
Sapporo FC (ja)	0–3	1–4	06/09	0–2	0–2		1–2	20/09
Sabas FC	20/09	1–4	13/09	0–5	1–3	0–1		2–4
Sapporo University Goal Plunderers (ja)	30/08	1–0	2–1	0–6	1–6	0–1	0–1	

Updated to match(es) played on June 14 2026. Source: June 17 2026 Hokkaido Football Association Hokkaido Football Association
Legend: Blue = home team win; Yellow = draw; Red = away team win.

=== Tohoku ===
==== Division 1 ====
Pos	Team	Pld	W	D	L	GF	GA	GD	Pts	Qualification or relegation
1	Cobaltore Onagawa	18	15	1	2	66	10	+56	46	Qualified for the 2026 Regional Champions League
2	Blancdieu Hirosaki (Note: Qualified because FC Basra Hyogo (Shakaijin Cup third place) already qualified via regional league champion.)	18	15	1	2	66	13	+53	46	Qualified for the 2026 Regional Champions League
3	Fukushima United FC Second	18	13	2	3	63	10	+53	41	
4	Hitome Senbonzakura SUFT (ja)	18	10	0	8	42	46	−4	30	
5	Ōyama SC	18	8	3	7	32	42	−10	27	
6	Sendai Sasuke (ja)	18	8	1	9	27	44	−17	25	
7	Shichigahama SC (ja)	18	5	2	11	27	45	−18	17	
8	Ganju Iwate	18	4	2	12	26	34	−8	14	
9	Shichinohe SC (ja)	18	4	2	12	20	48	−28	14	Relegated to Tohoku Division 2 North
10	Bogolle D. Tsugaru (ja)	18	1	0	17	13	90	−77	3	Relegated to Tohoku Division 2 North

Updated to match(es) played on Oct 18 2026. Source: Tohoku Football Association Tohoku Adult Soccer League - Ranking
Rules for classification: 1) Points, 2) Goal difference, 3) Total goals, 4) Head-to-head points, 5) Head-to-head goal difference, 6) Head-to-head goals, 7) Foul points, 8) Lottery

===== Results =====
Home \ Away	BLA	Bogolle D. Tsugaru (BOG)	COB	GAN	Hitome Senbonzakura SUFT (HIT)	FUS	OYA	Sendai Sasuke (SAS)	Shichigahama SC (SHG)	Shichinohe SC (SHN)
Blancdieu Hirosaki		12–0	2–1	3–2	3–0	0–2	0–1	2–0	6–0	5–2
Bogolle D. Tsugaru (ja)	0–6		0–6	0–3	1–2	0–5	1–2	1–2	1–3	3–2
Cobaltore Onagawa	0–1	8–0		4–0	5–3	3–1	1–1	4–0	5–0	8–1
Ganju Iwate	1–2	5–1	0–1		1–2	0–1	1–1	2–4	4–3	
Hitome Senbonzakura SUFT (ja)	1–4	5–1	0–5	4–1		2–9	6–0	4–1	3–2	2–1
Fukushima United FC Second	0–0	14–0	0–1	2–1	4–0		2–0	7–0	4–0	4–0
Ōyama SC	2–3	3–2	0–4	1–0	3–4	1–1		2–1	3–1	4–2
Sendai Sasuke (ja)	1–10	1–6	1–3	0–3	2–1	1–0	4–2		3–1	3–0
Shichigahama SC (ja)	0–3	4–1	0–4	2–0	2–3	1–1	2–2	1–0		5–0
Shichinohe SC (ja)	0–4	4–0	0–3	4–1	1–0	0–1	2–4	0–0	2–0	

Updated to match(es) played on October 18 2026. Source: November 21 2026 Tohoku Football Association Tohoku Adult Soccer League - Scores
Legend: Blue = home team win; Yellow = draw; Red = away team win.

==== Division 2 North ====
Pos	Team	Pld	W	D	L	GF	GA	GD	Pts	Qualification or relegation
1	Fuji Club 2003 (ja)	5	4	1	0	18	4	+14	13	Promotion to Tohoku Division 1
2	TDK Shinwakai (ja)	6	3	1	2	13	11	+2	10	
3	Saruta Kōgyō	6	2	2	2	21	17	+4	8	
4	Ōmiya SC (ja)	6	2	1	3	10	11	−1	7	
5	Ōshū United (ja)	6	2	1	3	12	15	−3	7	
6	Nippon Steel Kamaishi (ja)	5	2	1	2	10	14	−4	7	
7	Nu Perle Hiraizumi-Maesawa (ja)	6	2	1	3	6	12	−6	7	
8	Lideal Aomori (ja)	6	1	2	3	8	14	−6	5	Relegation to Prefectural League

Updated to match(es) played on 8 August 2026. Source: 2026 Tohoku Adult Soccer League 2nd Division North Match schedule and result
Rules for classification: 1) Points, 2) Goal difference, 3) Total goals, 4) Head-to-head points, 5) Head-to-head goal difference, 6) Head-to-head goals, 7) Foul points, 8) Lottery

===== Division 2 North Results =====
Home \ Away	Fuji Club 2003 (FUJ)	TDK Shinwakai (TDK)	Nippon Steel Kamaishi (NSK)	Ōmiya SC (OMI)	SAR	Nu Perle Hiraizumi-Maesawa (NUP)	Ōshū United (OSH)	Lideal Aomori (LID)
Fuji Club 2003 (ja)		8/30	0–4	5–1	10/18	9/20	9/13	4–0
TDK Shinwakai (ja)	11/8		2–1	2–1	9/13	10/25	4–1	1–2
Nippon Steel Kamaishi (ja)	11/1	9/20		9/13	10/25	2–1	5–2	8/30
Ōmiya SC (ja)	10/25	11/1	2–2		1–2	4–0	8/30	9/20
Saruta Kōgyō	2–4	4–4	7–0	9/6		8/30	9/20	11/1
Nu Perle Hiraizumi-Maesawa (ja)	5/31	2–0	9/6	10/18	11/8		11/1	2–2
Ōshū United (ja)	1–1	9/6	10/18	11/8	5–3	0–1		3–1
Lideal Aomori (ja)	9/6	10/18	11/8	0–1	3–3	9/13	10/25	

Updated to match(es) played on TBD. Source: TBD
Legend: Blue = home team win; Yellow = draw; Red = away team win.

==== Division 2 South ====
Pos	Team	Pld	W	D	L	GF	GA	GD	Pts	Qualification or relegation
1	IRIS. F.C.	5	5	0	0	31	2	+29	15	Promotion to Tohoku Division 1
2	FC Primeiro Fukushima (ja)	6	5	0	1	25	9	+16	15	
3	Merry (football club) (ja)	5	4	0	1	9	8	+1	12	
4	Sendai Sasuke (ja)	5	2	1	2	11	12	−1	7	
5	Parafrente Yonezawa (ja)	6	1	2	3	4	17	−13	5	
6	FC La U. de Sendai Segunda	4	1	1	2	2	8	−6	4	
7	Iwaki Furukawa FC (ja)	5	1	0	4	7	20	−13	3	Qualification for playoff (vs Prefectural Champion).
8	Yamagata BB	6	0	0	6	8	21	−13	0	Relegation to Prefectural League.

Updated to match(es) played on Scheduled May 17 2026. Source: 2026 Tohoku Adult Soccer League Division 2 South Standings
Rules for classification: 1) Points, 2) Goal difference, 3) Total goals, 4) Head-to-head points, 5) Head-to-head goal difference, 6) Head-to-head goals, 7) Foul points, 8) Lottery

===== Division 2 South Results =====
Home \ Away	IRI	Iwaki Furukawa FC (IWA)	LAU	Merry (football club) (MER)	Parafrente Yonezawa (PAR)	FC Primeiro Fukushima (PRI)	Sendai Sasuke (SUS)	YBB
IRIS. F.C.		31/05	08/11	06/09	28/06	18/10	24/05	21/06
Iwaki Furukawa FC (ja)	20/09		06/09	24/05	30/08	21/06	14/06	28/06
FC La U. de Sendai Segunda	30/08	17/05		01/11	14/06	07/06	25/10	20/09
Merry (football club) (ja)	17/05	13/09	28/06		25/10	31/05	08/11	14/06
Parafrente Yonezawa (ja)	15/11	08/11	11/10	21/06		06/09	20/09	24/05
FC Primeiro Fukushima (ja)	14/06	25/10	11/10	20/09	17/05		28/06	30/08
Sendai Sasuke (ja)	13/09	18/10	21/06	30/08	07/06	01/11		17/05
Yamagata BB	04/10	01/11	31/05	18/10	13/09	08/11	06/09	

Updated to match(es) played on TBD. Source: May 17 2026
Legend: Blue = home team win; Yellow = draw; Red = away team win.

=== Kantō ===
==== Division 1 ====
This is the 60th edition of the Kanto Soccer League Division 1

Division 1
Pos	Team	Pld	W	D	L	GF	GA	GD	Pts	Qualification or relegation
1	Toho Titanium	12	10	2	0	27	5	+22	32	Qualification for the 2026 Regional Champions League
2	Nankatsu SC (Note: As Shakaijin Cup runner up.)	12	6	4	2	23	13	+10	22	Qualification for the 2026 Regional Champions League
3	Tokyo United	12	6	4	2	18	10	+8	22	
4	Edo All United (ja)	12	4	4	4	18	17	+1	16	
5	Shibuya City (ja)	11	4	3	4	17	13	+4	15	
6	Toin University of Yokohama (ja)	11	4	3	4	15	17	−2	15	
7	Aries Toshima FC (ja) (Note: As Shakaijin Cup champion.)	11	4	2	5	15	18	−3	14	Qualification for the 2026 Regional Champions League
8	Tokyo 23	12	2	6	4	12	19	−7	12	
9	Nihon University FC (ja)	11	2	2	7	11	21	−10	8	Relegation to Kanto Division 2
10	RKD Ryugasaki	12	0	2	10	10	33	−23	2	Relegation to Kanto Division 2

Updated to match(es) played on August 8, 2026. Source: GoalNote 60th Kanto Soccer League Division 1
Rules for classification: 1) Points; 2) Goal difference; 3) Goals scored
- Ryutsu Keizai University Dragons Ryugazaki is the operator Ryutsu Keizai University soccer club. Because the Ryutsu Keizai University Soccer Club's indefinite suspension of activities was lifted, the 3rd round took place as planned, while the 1st and 2nd rounds, which had not been conducted, were rescheduled as postponements.

==== Division 2 ====
Division 2
Pos	Team	Pld	W	D	L	GF	GA	GD	Pts	Qualification or relegation
1	Tonan Maebashi	12	8	3	1	20	9	+11	27	Promotion to Kanto Division 1
2	Tochigi City U25	12	6	2	4	25	20	+5	20	Promotion to Kanto Division 1
3	Joyful Honda Tsukuba	12	5	3	4	9	9	0	18	
4	Tokyo International University FC (ja)	12	4	5	3	22	20	+2	17	
5	Onodera FC (ja)	10	4	4	2	15	10	+5	16	
6	Esperanza SC (ja)	12	5	1	6	13	17	−4	16	
7	Coedo Kawagoe FC (ja)	11	3	3	5	17	19	−2	12	
8	Atsugi Hayabusa (ja)	12	3	3	6	14	18	−4	12	
9	Hitachi Building System SC (ja)	12	3	3	6	11	18	−7	12	Relegation to Prefectural League
10	Vertfee Yaita	11	1	5	5	7	13	−6	8	Relegation to Tochigi Prefecture League

Updated to match(es) played on August 8, 2026.. Source: GoalNote
Rules for classification: 1) Points; 2) Goal difference; 3) Goals scored 4) Head-to-head points 5) Head-to-head goal difference 6) Head-to-head goals scored 7) Draw (Lottery)

=== Hokushin'etsu ===
==== Division 1 ====
This is the 52nd edition of the Hokushin'etsu Football League Division 1

Pos	Team	Pld	W	D	L	GF	GA	GD	Pts	Qualification or relegation
1	Fukui United	9	7	2	0	18	4	+14	23	Qualification for the 2026 Regional Champions League
2	Toyama Shinjo	9	6	2	1	27	4	+23	20	
3	Japan Soccer College	9	5	3	1	22	8	+14	18	
4	Niigata University of Health & Welfare (ja)	9	5	2	2	22	11	+11	17	
5	Artista Asama	9	5	1	3	20	9	+11	16	
6	FC Hokuriku	9	1	1	7	2	19	−17	4	
7	FC Matsucelona (ja)	9	1	0	8	2	25	−23	3	Relegation to Hokushin'etsu 2nd Division
8	Niigata University of Management	9	0	1	8	6	39	−33	1	Relegation to Hokushin'etsu 2nd Division

Updated to match(es) played on August 8, 2026. Source: GoalNote
Rules for classification: 1) Points; 2) Goal difference; 3) Goals scored 4) Head-to-head records between the teams; a. Points; b. Goal difference; c. Total Score.

==== Division 2 ====
This is the 23rd edition of the Hokushin'etsu Football League Division 2

Pos	Team	Pld	W	D	L	GF	GA	GD	Pts	Qualification or relegation
1	NUHW FC	9	8	0	1	25	2	+23	24	Promotion to Hokushin'etsu Division 1
2	SR Komatsu (ja)	9	5	2	2	20	18	+2	17	Promotion to Hokushin'etsu Division 1
3	Kanazawa Gakuin University FC	9	4	3	2	15	7	+8	15	
4	FC Abies (ja)	9	3	3	3	15	22	−7	12	
5	Joganji Toyama	9	3	2	4	17	13	+4	11	
6	Sakai Phoenix (ja)	9	2	3	4	10	15	−5	9	
7	N-Style Toyama (ja)	9	1	3	5	14	20	−6	6	Relegation to Prefectural League
8	Libertas Chikuma (ja)	9	2	0	7	6	25	−19	6	Relegation to Prefectural League

Updated to match(es) played on The match is scheduled to start on April 5, 2026. Source: TBA
Rules for classification: 1) Points; 2) Goal difference; 3) Goals scored; 4) Head-to-head record between the teams a.) Points; b.) goal difference; c.) Total Score

=== Tōkai ===
==== Division 1 ====
Pos	Team	Pld	W	D	L	GF	GA	GD	Pts	Qualification or relegation
1	FC Kariya	12	9	0	3	19	9	+10	27	Qualification for the 2026 Regional Champions League
2	Gakunan F. Mosuperio (ja)	10	7	1	2	16	7	+9	22	
3	Wyvern FC	9	5	2	2	16	9	+7	17	
4	Fujieda City Hall	10	4	5	1	12	10	+2	17	
5	Atletico Suzuka Club	10	3	4	3	6	5	+1	13	
6	Tokai FC (ja)	11	3	1	7	9	16	−7	10	
7	Yazaki Valente (ja)	11	2	3	6	7	17	−10	9	
8	Ise-Shima	10	2	2	6	10	12	−2	8	Relegation to Tōkai Division 2
9	Chukyo University FC	11	2	2	7	10	20	−10	8	Relegation to Tōkai Division 2

Updated to match(es) played on August 8, 2026. Source: TBA
Rules for classification: 1) Points; 2) Goal difference; 3) Goals scored 4) Head-to-head record between the teams: 5) Winning percentage (total number of wins ÷ total matches)

==== Division 2 ====
Pos	Team	Pld	W	D	L	GF	GA	GD	Pts	Qualification or relegation
1	Voyagers (ja)	10	6	2	2	13	7	+6	20	Promotion to Tokai Division 1
2	FC Gifu Second (ja)	9	5	1	3	21	11	+10	16	Promotion to Tokai Division 1
3	Rajil FC Higashi-Mikawa (ja)	10	4	2	4	15	24	−9	14	
4	Vencedor Mie (ja)	9	4	1	4	7	9	−2	13	
5	AS Kariya (ja)	11	3	4	4	12	16	−4	13	
6	Tokai Gakuen University FC (ja)	9	3	1	5	15	12	+3	10	
7	FC Bombonera (ja)	8	3	1	4	14	14	0	10	Relegation to Prefectural League
8	Sports & Society Izu (ja)	8	3	0	5	12	16	−4	9	Relegation to Prefectural League

Updated to match(es) played on August 8, 2026. Source: TBA
Rules for classification: 1) Points; 2) Goal difference; 3) Goals scored 4) Head-to-head record between the teams: 5) Winning percentage (total number of wins ÷ total matches)

=== Kansai ===
==== Division 1 ====
Pos	Team	Pld	W	D	L	GF	GA	GD	Pts	Qualification or relegation
1	Cento Cuore Harima	9	6	3	0	20	5	+15	21	Qualification for the 2026 Regional Champions League
2	FC Basara Hyogo (ja)	9	5	3	1	22	7	+15	18	
3	Arterivo Wakayama	9	4	5	0	20	5	+15	17	
4	Ococias Kyoto	9	3	3	3	13	14	−1	12	
5	Ikoma FC Nara (ja)	9	3	2	4	11	13	−2	11	
6	Asuka FC	9	2	4	3	11	14	−3	10	
7	Laranja Kyoto	9	1	2	6	3	26	−23	5	
8	Moriyama Samurai 2000 (ja)	9	0	2	7	6	22	−16	2	Relegation to Kansai Division 2

Updated to match(es) played on August 8, 2026. Source: GoalNote Cloud KSL Kansai Soccer League
Rules for classification: 1) Points; 2) Goal difference; 3) Goals scored 4) Head-to-head records between the teams; a. Points; b. goal difference; c. Total Score.

==== Division 2 ====
This is the 21st edition of the Kansai Football League Division 2

Pos	Team	Pld	W	D	L	GF	GA	GD	Pts	Qualification or relegation
1	Osaka City SC	9	7	2	0	24	9	+15	23	Promotion to Division 1
2	FC AWJ (ja)	9	6	2	1	23	7	+16	20	Promotion to Division 1
3	Hannan University Soccer Club (ja)	9	5	2	2	20	12	+8	17	Promotion to Division 1
4	Kansai FC 2008 (ja)	9	5	2	2	25	18	+7	17	
5	AC Middlerange (ja)	9	3	2	4	18	17	+1	11	
6	Route 11 (ja)	9	3	2	4	17	16	+1	11	
7	Bandito Ikoma	9	1	0	8	8	35	−27	3	
8	Kobe FC 1970 (ja)	9	0	0	9	12	33	−21	0	

Updated to match(es) played on August 8, 2026.. Source: Kansai Soccer League GoalNote
Rules for classification: 1) Points; 2) Goal difference; 3) Goals scored 4) Head-to-head records between the teams; a. Points; b. Goal difference; c. Total score. 5) Discipline
- The 2027 league will be played with 10 teams, so the top three teams are automatically promoted to Division 1, there is no relegation to the prefectural league. The top 4 teams from the Kansai Prefectural Soccer League Final Tournament will be automatically promoted to Division 2.
- With Kansai University FC 2008 withdrawing from the Kansai League, the number of promotion slots from the prefectural league was increased by one to five.

=== Chūgoku ===
This is the 54th edition of the Chūgoku Football League.

Pos	Team	Pld	W	D	L	GF	GA	GD	Pts	Qualification or relegation
1	Fukuyama City	15	14	1	0	53	7	+46	43	Qualification for the 2026 Regional Champions League
2	Belugarosso Iwami	15	13	1	1	41	11	+30	40	
3	SRC Hiroshima	15	8	2	5	30	21	+9	26	
4	Baleine Shimonoseki	15	7	4	4	21	18	+3	25	
5	Mitsubishi Mizushima	15	7	2	6	30	26	+4	23	
6	Yonago Genki SC (ja)	15	4	3	8	15	25	−10	15	
7	International Pacific Univ. FC	15	4	1	10	15	23	−8	13	
8	Valimore Aki	15	3	2	10	19	37	−18	11	
9	Miyajima United (ja)	15	2	4	9	13	31	−18	10	
10	ENEOS Mizushima (ja)	15	2	2	11	10	48	−38	8	Relegation to Okayama Prefecture League

Updated to match(es) played on 8 August 2026.. Source: Chūgoku Soccer League
Rules for classification: 1) Points; 2) Goal difference; 3) Goals scored

The 9th place team would normally participate in the promotion/relegation playoff, but due to 2026 regulations, the playoff will not be held and Miyajima United remained in the Chugoku League.

=== Shikoku ===
Pos	Team	Pld	W	D	L	GF	GA	GD	Pts	Qualification or relegation
1	SONIO Takamatsu (ja)	10	9	1	0	49	6	+43	28	Qualification for the 2026 Regional Champions League
2	FC Tokushima	9	7	2	0	38	3	+35	23	
3	Lvnirosso NC (ja)	10	6	2	2	12	9	+3	20	
4	KUFC Nankoku (ja)	9	3	3	3	12	10	+2	12	
5	Alverio Takamatsu (ja)	10	3	1	6	11	32	−21	10	
6	Llamas Kochi (ja)	10	2	3	5	13	30	−17	9	
7	Tadotsu FC (ja)	10	1	2	7	9	19	−10	5	
8	MSP Yashima FC	10	1	0	9	5	40	−35	3	Relegated to Kagawa Prefecture League

Updated to match(es) played on August 8, 2026. Source: TBA
Rules for classification: 1) Points; 2) Goal difference; 3) Goals scored
- The 2027 season will be contested with 10 teams, so only the 8th placed was relegated to the prefectural league, with no promotion/relegation playoffs; the top three teams from the prefectural league will be automatically promoted in the Shikoku League Challenge Team Deciding match.

==== Results ====
Home \ Away	Alverio Takamatsu (ALT)	KUF	Llamas Kochi (LLA)	Lvnirosso NC (LVN)	Sonio Takamatsu (SON)	Tadotsu FC (TAD)	TOK	YAS
Alverio Takamatsu (ja)								
KUFC Nankoku								
Llamas Kochi (ja)								
Lvnirosso NC (ja)								
Sonio Takamatsu (ja)								
Tadotsu FC (ja)								
FC Tokushima								
MSP Yashima FC								

Updated to match(es) played on The matches are scheduled to start on April 11, 2026.. Source: TBA
Legend: Blue = home team win; Yellow = draw; Red = away team win.

=== Kyushu ===
This is the 54th edition of the Kyushu Soccer League.

Pos	Team	Pld	W	D	L	GF	GA	GD	Pts	Qualification or relegation
1	Veroskronos Tsuno	14	14	0	0	51	2	+49	42	Qualification for the 2026 Regional Champions League
2	KMG Holdings (ja)	14	12	0	2	32	6	+26	36	
3	Nobeoka Agata	14	11	0	3	37	18	+19	33	
4	Brew Saga	14	5	3	6	15	20	−5	18	
5	Mitsubishi HI Nagasaki SC (ja)	14	5	3	6	13	20	−7	18	
6	NIFS Kanoya FC (ja)	14	3	4	7	9	14	−5	13	
7	Nexus Miyako FC	14	4	1	9	19	35	−16	13	
8	Kawasoe Club (ja)	14	2	5	7	10	24	−14	11	
9	Club Atletico Celeste	13	2	2	9	8	33	−25	8	Qualification for playoff match
10	Nippon Steel Oita SC (ja)	13	0	4	9	10	32	−22	4	Relegation to Prefectural League

Updated to match(es) played on August 8, 2026. Source: KYFA 54th Kyushu Soccer League
Rules for classification: 1) Points; 2) Goal difference; 3) Goals scored; 4) Head-to-head points; 5) Head-to-head goal difference; 6) Head-to-head goals

==== Results ====
Home \ Away	BRE	CAC	KAN	Kawasoe Club (KAW)	KMG Holdings FC (KMG)	Mitsubishi HI Nagasaki SC (MHI)	NEX	NOB	Nippon Steel Oita SC (NSO)	VER
Brew Saga					0–0	0–1				
Club Atletico Celeste										0–4
NIFS Kanoya FC										
Kawasoe Club (ja)					0–1					
KMG Holdings FC (ja)			2–0							
Mitsubishi HI Nagasaki SC (ja)									3–2	
Nexus Miyako FC			0–3							
Nobeoka Agata		7–0								
Nippon Steel Oita SC (ja)								2–3		
Veroskronos Tsuno							4–0			

Updated to match(es) played on TBA. Source: TBA
Legend: Blue = home team win; Yellow = draw; Red = away team win.
