= 2021 Japanese Regional Leagues =

Japanese amateur leagues football season

Japanese Regional Leagues
- Season: 2021
- Promoted: Criacao Shinjuku

The 2021 Japanese Regional Leagues, the fifth tier of the Japanese association football league system, held their regular season 2021, marking the 56th edition Japanese Regional Leagues. This edition of the Regional Leagues featured 144 teams divided across nine regional leagues. The winners of the first division of each Regional League, along with three runners-up from the nine Regional Leagues (determined by criteria set by the JFA), qualified for the 2021 Japanese Regional Football Champions League. It served as a single-elimination tournament, where the winner and the runner-up of the competition could qualify either directly for the Japan Football (JFL) or through a play-off match with one of the last-placed teams in JFL standings. The decision on how the winner (and/or runner-up) would be promoted to the JFL was made by the league board.

== Champions list ==
Region	Champions
Hokkaido	Tokachi Sky Earth
Tohoku	Cobaltore Onagawa
Kantō	Criacao Shinjuku
Hokushinetsu	Fukui United
Tōkai	Fujieda City Hall
Kansai	Ococias Kyoto
Chūgoku	Mitsubishi Mizushima
Shikoku	FC Tokushima
Kyushu	Okinawa SV

== Hokkaido ==
The tournament was terminated on August 26 due to the restrictions caused by the Covid-19 pandemic.

=== League table at the time of abandonment ===
Pos	Team	Pld	W	D	L	GF	GA	GD	Pts	Qualification
1	Hokkaido Tokachi Sky Earth (Q)	5	5	0	0	25	1	+24	15	Qualification for the Regional Football Champions League
2	Norbritz Hokkaido	5	5	0	0	24	3	+21	15	
3	Sapporo U. Goal Plunderers	5	4	0	1	14	4	+10	12	
4	Sapporo FC	5	3	0	2	18	8	+10	9	
5	Hokushukai Iwamizawa	5	2	0	3	11	9	+2	6	
6	Nippon Steel Muroran	5	2	0	3	8	13	−5	6	
7	Shintoku FC	5	2	0	3	11	22	−11	6	Qualification for relegation play-offs
8	R. Superbe Kushiro	5	1	0	4	6	19	−13	3	Qualification for relegation play-offs
9	Nippon Express (R)	5	1	0	4	4	22	−18	3	Relegated to Prefectural Leagues
10	Kyoku Shu-kai (R)	5	0	0	5	3	23	−20	0	Relegated to Prefectural Leagues

Source: Soccerway
Rules for classification: 1) Points; 2) Goal difference; 3) Goals scored
(Q) Qualified for the phase indicated; (R) Relegated

== Tohoku ==
=== Division 1 ===
The tournament was terminated on Sep 6 due to the restrictions caused by the Covid-19 pandemic.

==== League table at the time of abandonment ====
Pos	Team	Pld	W	D	L	GF	GA	GD	Pts	Qualification
1	Cobaltore Onagawa	8	7	1	0	29	7	+22	22	Qualification for the Regional Football Champions League
2	Blancdieu Hirosaki	8	7	0	1	29	3	+26	21	
3	Ganju Iwate	8	4	1	3	10	7	+3	13	
4	FC Sendai University	8	3	2	3	20	8	+12	11	
5	Shichigahama SC	8	3	1	4	19	13	+6	10	
6	Fuji Club 2003	7	3	1	3	13	8	+5	10	
7	Dogizaka FC	6	2	2	2	7	7	0	8	
8	Nippon Steel Kamaishi	7	2	2	3	8	15	−7	8	
9	FC Primeiro	5	2	0	3	6	22	−16	6	
10	Morioka Zebra	6	1	1	4	8	18	−10	4	
11	Saruta Kogyo	5	1	1	3	13	25	−12	4	
12	Omiya SC	6	0	0	6	4	33	−29	0	

Source: Soccerway
Rules for classification: 1) Points; 2) Goal difference; 3) Goals scored

=== Division 2 North ===
The tournament was terminated due to the restrictions caused by the Covid-19 pandemic.

==== League table at the time of abandonment ====
Pos	Team	Pld	W	D	L	GF	GA	GD	Pts
1	Mizusawa SC	2	2	0	0	7	2	+5	6
2	Akita FC Cambiare	2	2	0	0	6	4	+2	6
3	Lascivo Aomori	2	1	1	0	4	0	+4	4
4	NuPere Hiraizumi Maesawa	4	1	1	2	8	6	+2	4
5	Tono Club	1	1	0	0	2	1	+1	3
6	TDK Shinwakai	2	0	1	1	4	5	−1	1
7	Hokuto Bank	3	0	1	2	5	8	−3	1
8	Gonohe SC	2	0	0	2	0	10	−10	0

Source: RSSSF
Rules for classification: 1) Points; 2) Goal difference; 3) Goals scored

=== Division 2 South ===
The tournament was terminated due to the restrictions caused by the Covid-19 pandemic.

==== League table at the time of abandonment ====
Pos	Team	Pld	W	D	L	GF	GA	GD	Pts	Qualification
1	Ricoh Industry Tohoku	4	2	2	0	8	2	+6	8	
2	Sendai Sasuke	3	2	1	0	11	3	+8	7	
3	Parafrente Yonezawa	3	2	0	1	11	3	+8	6	
4	Oyama SC	2	2	0	0	5	2	+3	6	
5	Ardore Kuwabara	3	1	2	0	4	3	+1	5	
6	FC La University de Sendai	2	1	1	0	12	4	+8	4	
7	Merry	3	0	2	1	3	5	−2	2	
8	Iwaki Furukawa	1	0	1	0	1	1	0	1	
9	Mikawa SC	3	0	1	2	1	10	−9	1	
10	Nagai Club	3	0	0	3	5	16	−11	0	
11	Soma SC	3	0	0	3	0	12	−12	0	
12	Bandits Iwaki	0	0	0	0	0	0	0	0	Withdrawn

Source: RSSSF
Rules for classification: 1) Points; 2) Goal difference; 3) Goals scored

== Kantō ==
=== Division 1 ===
Pos	Team	Pld	W	D	L	GF	GA	GD	Pts	Qualification
1	Criacao Shinjuku (P)	22	16	2	4	50	23	+27	50	Qualification for the Regional Football Champions League
2	Briobecca Urayasu	22	15	4	3	54	19	+35	49	
3	Vonds Ichihara	22	14	3	5	40	15	+25	45	
4	Tochigi City	22	14	2	6	45	26	+19	44	
5	Tokyo 23	22	11	3	8	36	25	+11	36	
6	Esperanza	22	9	4	9	33	38	−5	31	
7	RKU Dragons Ryugasaki	22	8	2	12	24	34	−10	26	
8	Tsukuba FC	22	7	4	11	30	32	−2	25	
9	Tokyo United	22	7	3	12	21	29	−8	24	
10	Toin University of Yokohama FC (R)	22	6	5	11	23	32	−9	23	Qualification for relegation play-offs
11	Hitachi Building Systems (R)	22	3	7	12	19	46	−27	16	Relegated to the 2022 Kantō Soccer League Division 2
12	Ryutsu Keizai University FC (R)	22	1	3	18	17	73	−56	6	Relegated to the 2022 Kantō Soccer League Division 2

Source: Soccerway
Rules for classification: 1) Points; 2) Goal difference; 3) Goals scored
(P) Promoted; (R) Relegated

=== Division 2 ===
Pos	Team	Pld	W	D	L	GF	GA	GD	Pts	Qualification
1	Toho Titanium (P)	18	12	3	3	29	12	+17	39	Promoted to the 2022 Kantō Soccer League Division 1
2	Nankatsu SC (P)	18	10	6	2	37	18	+19	36	Qualification for promotion play-offs
3	Tonan Maebashi	18	9	4	5	31	23	+8	31	
4	Yokohama Takeru	18	8	4	6	23	17	+6	28	
5	Identy Mirai	18	8	3	7	23	17	+6	27	
6	Aventura Kawaguchi	18	8	2	8	25	24	+1	26	
7	Tokyo International University FC	18	7	4	7	29	26	+3	25	
8	Vonds Ichihara Vert (res) (R)	18	7	1	10	27	30	−3	22	Qualification for relegation play-offs
9	Saitama SC (R)	18	2	4	12	13	43	−30	10	Qualification for relegation play-offs
10	Thespa Kusatsu Challengers (R)	18	2	3	13	12	39	−27	9	Relegated to Prefectural Leagues

Source: RSSSF
Rules for classification: 1) Points; 2) Goal difference; 3) Goals scored
(P) Promoted; (R) Relegated

=== Kantō Playoffs ===
==== Div 1/Div 2 ====
25 December 2021

Toin University of Yokohama FC	1–4	Nankatsu SC
	Report

==== Div 2/Prefectural ====
25 December 2021

Vonds Ichihara Vert (res)	0–3	Vertfee Yaita
	Report

25 December 2021

Saitama SC	0–4	Aries Tokyo
	Report

== Hokushinetsu ==
=== Division 1 ===
Pos	Team	Pld	W	D	L	GF	GA	GD	Pts	Qualification
1	Fukui United (Q)	16	13	1	2	48	15	+33	40	Qualification for the Regional Football Champions League
2	Artista Asama (Q)	16	11	2	3	41	14	+27	35	
3	Niigata UHW	16	11	1	4	59	15	+44	34	
4	Toyama Shinjo	16	11	1	4	39	20	+19	34	
5	Japan Soccer College	16	7	3	6	29	21	+8	24	
6	Sakai Phoenix	16	5	1	10	26	52	−26	16	
7	05 Kamo FC	16	4	0	12	29	59	−30	12	
8	FC Hokuriku (R)	16	3	2	11	19	39	−20	11	Relegated to the 2022 Hokushinetsu Football League Division 2
9	FC Matsucelona (R)	16	1	1	14	14	69	−55	4	Relegated to the 2022 Hokushinetsu Football League Division 2

Source: Soccerway
Rules for classification: 1) Points; 2) Goal difference; 3) Goals scored
(Q) Qualified for the phase indicated; (R) Relegated

=== Division 2 ===
Pos	Team	Pld	W	D	L	GF	GA	GD	Pts	Qualification
1	Libertas Chikuma (P)	14	9	3	2	24	14	+10	30	Promoted to the 2022 Hokushinetsu Football League Division 1
2	CUPS Seiro	14	9	2	3	46	12	+34	29	
3	Antelope Shiojiri	14	7	2	5	31	28	+3	23	
4	SR Komatsu	14	7	2	5	23	22	+1	23	
5	09 Keidai FC	14	6	4	4	31	18	+13	22	
6	Nagaoka Billboard (R)	14	5	1	8	23	31	−8	16	Relegated to Prefectural Leagues
7	AS Jamineiro (R)	14	4	2	8	24	30	−6	14	Relegated to Prefectural Leagues
8	Nagaoka Estilo (R)	14	1	0	13	6	53	−47	3	Relegated to Prefectural Leagues
9	Hokuriku University Futures	0	0	0	0	0	0	0	0	Withdrawn

Source: RSSSF
Rules for classification: 1) Points; 2) Goal difference; 3) Goals scored
(P) Promoted; (R) Relegated

== Tōkai ==
=== Division 1 ===
The tournament was terminated due to the restrictions caused by the Covid-19 pandemic.

==== League table at the time of abandonment ====
Pos	Team	Pld	W	D	L	GF	GA	GD	Pts	Qualification
1	Fujieda City Hall	5	4	1	0	11	2	+9	13	Qualification for the Regional Football Champions League
2	FC Ise-Shima	5	3	1	1	13	1	+12	10	
3	Chukyo University FC A	5	2	2	1	6	2	+4	8	
4	Toyota FC	4	2	0	2	3	12	−9	6	
5	Chukyo University FC B	4	1	1	2	6	5	+1	4	
6	Tokai Gakuen University FC	4	1	1	2	10	10	0	4	
7	Tokoha University Hamamatsu FC	4	1	0	3	3	14	−11	3	
8	Yazaki Valente	3	0	0	3	2	8	−6	0	

Source: Soccerway
Rules for classification: 1) Points; 2) Goal difference; 3) Goals scored

=== Division 2 ===
The tournament was terminated due to the restrictions caused by the Covid-19 pandemic.

==== League table at the time of abandonment ====
Pos	Team	Pld	W	D	L	GF	GA	GD	Pts
1	Bombonera Gifu	7	6	0	1	23	7	+16	18
2	Wyvern FC	7	6	0	1	16	6	+10	18
3	AS Kariya	8	5	1	2	26	14	+12	16
4	FC Gifu (res)	7	4	0	3	16	8	+8	12
5	Nagara Club	5	2	0	3	10	10	0	6
6	Nagoya SC	6	2	0	4	5	11	−6	6
7	FC Ogaki K’	4	1	1	2	4	11	−7	4
8	Rivielta Toyokawa	6	1	0	5	5	16	−11	3
9	Yokkaichi University FC	6	0	0	6	2	24	−22	0

Source: RSSSF
Rules for classification: 1) Points; 2) Goal difference; 3) Goals scored

== Kansai ==
=== Division 1 ===
Pos	Team	Pld	W	D	L	GF	GA	GD	Pts	Qualification
1	Ococias Kyoto (Q)	14	10	3	1	43	13	+30	33	Qualification for the Regional Football Champions League
2	Arterivo Wakayama	14	10	1	3	32	11	+21	31	
3	Porvenir Asuka	14	8	3	3	22	11	+11	27	
4	Cento Cuore Harima	14	8	2	4	29	15	+14	26	
5	AS Laranja Kyoto	14	4	3	7	22	29	−7	15	
6	Lagend Shiga	14	3	5	6	18	21	−3	14	
7	Kandai FC 2008 (R)	14	2	3	9	21	29	−8	9	Relegated to the 2022 Kansai Soccer League Division 2
8	Kandai Club 2010 (R)	14	1	0	13	6	64	−58	3	Relegated to the 2022 Kansai Soccer League Division 2

Source: Soccerway
Rules for classification: 1) Points; 2) Goal difference; 3) Goals scored
(Q) Qualified for the phase indicated; (R) Relegated

=== Division 2 ===
This is the 17th edition of the Kansai Football League Division 2

Pos	Team	Pld	W	D	L	GF	GA	GD	Pts	Qualification
1	Moriyama Samurai 2000	0	0	0	0	0	0	0	0	Promoted to the 2022 Kansai Soccer League Division 1
2	FC Awaji-shima	0	0	0	0	0	0	0	0	Promoted to the 2022 Kansai Soccer League Division 1
3	St. Andrew's FC	0	0	0	0	0	0	0	0	
4	Hannan University Club	0	0	0	0	0	0	0	0	
5	Takasago Mineiro	0	0	0	0	0	0	0	0	
6	Kyoto Shiko SC (ja)	0	0	0	0	0	0	0	0	
7	Kobe FC 1970	0	0	0	0	0	0	0	0	
8	FC Easy 02 Akashi	0	0	0	0	0	0	0	0	
9	Kyoto Fire Department	0	0	0	0	0	0	0	0	Relegated to Prefectural Leagues

Source: RSSSF
Rules for classification: 1) Points; 2) Goal difference; 3) Goals scored

== Chūgoku ==
Pos	Team	Pld	W	D	L	GF	GA	GD	Pts	Qualification
1	Mitsubishi Mizushima (Q)	16	11	3	2	42	10	+32	36	Qualification for the Regional Football Champions League
2	Baleine Shimonoseki (Q)	16	11	2	3	35	16	+19	35	Qualification for the Regional Football Champions League
3	Pacific University	16	6	7	3	21	16	+5	25	
4	Bergarosso Hamada	16	7	2	7	27	25	+2	23	
5	NTN Okayama	16	7	2	7	25	37	−12	23	
6	SRC Hiroshima	16	6	2	8	27	24	+3	20	
7	Yonago Genki	16	4	5	7	16	26	−10	17	
8	Fujifilm BIJ Hiroshima	16	4	3	9	16	32	−16	15	
9	ENEOS Mizushima (R)	16	2	2	12	18	41	−23	8	Relegated to Prefectural Leagues

Source: Soccerway
Rules for classification: 1) Points; 2) Goal difference; 3) Goals scored
(Q) Qualified for the phase indicated; (R) Relegated

== Shikoku ==
The tournament was terminated on August 11 due to the restrictions caused by the Covid-19 pandemic.

=== League table at the time of abandonment ===
Pos	Team	Pld	W	D	L	GF	GA	GD	Pts	Qualification
1	FC Tokushima (Q)	7	7	0	0	38	8	+30	21	Qualification for the Regional Football Champions League
2	KUFC Nankoku	8	6	1	1	28	9	+19	19	
3	Llamas Kochi	9	5	2	2	25	14	+11	17	
4	Tadotsu FC	9	5	0	4	19	12	+7	15	
5	Lavenirosso NC	9	5	0	4	20	16	+4	15	
6	FC Yanagimachi	9	2	1	6	12	34	−22	7	
7	Nakamura Club	8	1	1	6	6	27	−21	4	
8	R. Velho Takamatsu	9	0	1	8	8	36	−28	1	

Source: Soccerway
Rules for classification: 1) Points; 2) Goal difference; 3) Goals scored
(Q) Qualified for the phase indicated

== Kyushu ==
In the Kyushu Soccer League, drawn games were decided on penalty shootouts. The winners of these shootouts were awarded two points, while the losers were awarded one.

Pos	Team	Pld	W	PW	PL	L	GF	GA	GD	Pts	Qualification
1	Okinawa SV (Q)	18	16	1	1	0	78	8	+70	51	Qualification for the Regional Football Champions League
2	Veroskronos Tsuno	18	16	1	0	1	76	12	+64	50	
3	J-Lease FC	18	12	1	1	4	38	19	+19	39	
4	Saga LIXIL FC	18	8	1	1	8	50	37	+13	27	
5	NIFS Kanoya FC	18	8	1	1	8	20	31	−11	27	
6	Kaiho Bank	18	7	0	0	11	29	37	−8	21	
7	Kyushu Mitsubishi Motors	18	5	1	3	9	29	41	−12	20	
8	Kawasoe Club	18	5	1	0	12	27	78	−51	17	
9	Kumamoto Teachers	18	4	0	0	14	29	50	−21	12	
10	FC Nakatsu (R)	18	2	0	0	16	14	77	−63	6	Relegated to Prefectural Leagues
11	Nippon Steel Oita	0	0	0	0	0	0	0	0	0	Withdrawn

Source: Soccerway
Rules for classification: 1) Points; 2) Goal difference; 3) Goals scored
(Q) Qualified to the phase indicated; (R) Relegated

== See also ==
- Japan Football Association (JFA)

League(s)

- J.League
  - 2021 J1 League (Tier 1)
  - 2021 J2 League (Tier 2)
  - 2021 J3 League (Tier 3)
- 2021 Japan Football League (JFL) (Tier 4)
- 2021 Regional Champions League (Promotion playoffs to JFL)

Cup(s)

- 2021 Fuji Xerox Super Cup
- 2021 Emperor's Cup (National Open Cup)
- 2021 J.League YBC Levain Cup (League Cup)
