= Ren Yamamoto =

Ren Yamamoto may refer to:

- Ren Yamamoto (footballer, born 1997) (山本 蓮), Japanese footballer
- Ren Yamamoto (footballer, born 1999) (山本 廉), Japanese footballer
