= 2016 Japanese Regional Leagues =

Japanese amateur leagues football season

Japanese Regional Leagues
- Season: 2016
- Promoted: FC Imabari; Veertien Mie

The 2016 Japanese Regional Leagues were a competition between parallel association football leagues ranking at the bottom of the Japan Football League.

== Champions list ==
Qualified for the 40th Promotion Regional Series

Region	Champions
Hokkaido	Norbritz Hokkaido
Tohoku	Cobaltore Onagawa
Kantō	Tokyo 23 FC
Hokushinetsu	Artista Tomi
Tokai	FC Kariya
Kansai	Arterivo Wakayama
Chūgoku	SRC Hiroshima
Shikoku	FC Imabari
Kyushu	J.FC Miyazaki

== Hokkaido ==
Pos	Team	Pld	W	D	L	GF	GA	GD	Pts	Qualification or relegation
1	Norbritz Hokkaido (C, Q)	14	9	5	0	47	11	+36	32	Qualification for the 2016 Regional Champions League
2	Tokachi Fairsky FC	14	9	3	2	41	18	+23	30	
3	Sapporo Football Club	14	9	2	3	48	15	+33	29	
4	Sapporo University GOAL PLUNDERERS	14	6	3	5	47	34	+13	21	
5	Nippon Express FC	14	6	1	7	40	27	+13	19	
6	Imamizawa FC Hokushukai	14	5	0	9	27	56	−29	15	
7	Sapporo Hokkaido University (R)	14	4	1	9	26	59	−33	13	Relegated to Sapporo Block League
8	Verdelazzo Asahikawa (R)	14	0	1	13	10	66	−56	1	Relegated to the Northern Hokkaido Block League

Rules for classification: 1) Points; 2) Goal difference; 3) Goals scored
(C) Champions; (Q) Qualified for the phase indicated; (R) Relegated

== Tohoku ==
=== Division 1 ===
Pos	Team	Pld	W	D	L	GF	GA	GD	Pts	Qualification or relegation
1	Cobaltore Onagawa (C, Q)	18	13	4	1	66	9	+57	43	
2	Blancdieu Hirosaki FC	18	10	4	4	34	23	+11	34	
3	FC Ganju Iwate	18	9	5	4	48	31	+17	32	
4	FC Primeiro	18	9	3	6	38	33	+5	30	
5	Morioka Zebra	18	8	4	6	50	33	+17	28	
6	Bandits Iwaki FC	18	7	2	9	32	44	−12	23	
7	Fuji Club 2003	18	7	1	10	27	38	−11	22	
8	Sendai Sasuke FC	18	6	2	10	20	36	−16	20	
9	Saruta Kōgyō S.C. [tl] (R)	18	6	1	11	38	44	−6	19	Relegated to Div. 2 North
10	Iwaki Furukawa FC (R)	18	2	0	16	20	84	−64	6	Relegated to Div. 2 South

(C) Champions; (Q) Qualified for the phase indicated; (R) Relegated

=== Division 2 North ===
Pos	Team	Pld	W	D	L	GF	GA	GD	Pts	Promotion or relegation
1	Nippon Steel Kamaishi (C, P)	18	15	0	3	51	18	+33	45	Promoted to Div. 1
2	Akita FC Cambiare	18	14	2	2	57	18	+39	44	
3	Akita University School of Medicine	18	10	2	6	42	35	+7	32	
4	Hachinohe Gakuin University FC 2014	18	9	3	6	46	33	+13	30	
5	Omiya Club	18	7	3	8	44	39	+5	24	
6	TDK Shinwakai	18	6	2	10	34	35	−1	20	
7	Mizusawa Club	18	5	4	9	23	45	−22	19	
8	Hirazumi Maezawa (R)	18	5	3	10	27	51	−24	18	Relegated to Iwate Prefectural League
9	Hanamaki Club (R)	18	3	5	10	22	38	−16	14	Relegated to Iwate Prefectural League
10	Shichinohe SC (R)	18	2	4	12	19	53	−34	10	Relegated to Aomori Prefectural League

(C) Champions; (P) Promoted; (R) Relegated

=== Division 2 South ===
Pos	Team	Pld	W	D	L	GF	GA	GD	Pts	Promotion or relegation
1	Merry FC (C, P)	18	13	5	0	60	14	+46	44	Promoted to Div. 1
2	Soma SC	18	11	2	5	46	29	+17	35	
3	Nakaniida Soccer Club	18	11	0	7	44	23	+21	33	
4	Kureha SC	18	9	3	6	38	36	+2	30	
5	FC Parafrente Yonezawa	18	9	0	9	43	32	+11	27	
6	Duopark FC	18	8	2	8	37	31	+6	26	
7	Sendai Nakada FC	18	8	2	8	31	39	−8	26	
8	FC Scheinen Fukushima (R)	18	5	4	9	37	41	−4	19	Relegated to Fukushima Prefectural League
9	Marysol Matsushima SC (R)	18	4	1	13	26	81	−55	13	Relegated to Miyagi Prefectural League
10	Tozawa FC (R)	18	2	1	15	22	58	−36	7	Relegated to Yamagata Prefectural League

(C) Champions; (P) Promoted; (R) Relegated

== Kantō ==
=== Division 1 ===
Pos	Team	Pld	W	D	L	GF	GA	GD	Pts	Qualification or relegation
1	Tokyo 23 FC (C)	18	14	2	2	36	18	+18	44	
2	Vonds Ichihara	18	11	3	4	40	14	+26	36	
3	Yokohama Takeru	18	11	2	5	43	31	+12	35	
4	Vertfee Takahara Nasu	18	8	4	6	23	23	0	28	
5	Tsukuba FC	18	8	3	7	37	34	+3	27	
6	Ryutsu Keizai University FC	18	7	3	8	30	33	−3	24	
7	Saitama SC	18	6	4	8	29	30	−1	22	
8	Aries FC Tokyo	18	6	4	8	24	30	−6	22	
9	Tonan Maebashi (R)	18	3	5	10	20	32	−12	14	Relegated to Div. 2
10	FC Korea (R)	18	1	0	17	14	51	−37	3	Relegated to Div. 2

(C) Champions; (R) Relegated

=== Division 2 ===
Pos	Team	Pld	W	D	L	GF	GA	GD	Pts	Promotion or relegation
1	Tokyo United FC (C, P)	18	11	3	4	36	18	+18	36	Promoted to Div. 1
2	Hitachi Building System (P)	18	10	3	5	34	35	−1	33	Promoted to Div. 1
3	Kanagawa Prefecture Teachers SC	18	10	2	6	34	31	+3	32	
4	Nippon Engineering College F. Marinos	18	8	2	8	29	26	+3	26	
5	Esperanza SC	18	6	6	6	43	29	+14	24	
6	Toho Titanium SC	18	6	6	6	29	35	−6	24	
7	FC TIU	18	7	2	9	33	32	+1	23	
8	Waseda United	18	6	3	9	24	30	−6	21	
9	Atsugi Marcus (R)	18	5	3	10	8	23	−15	18	Relegated to Kanagawa Prefectural League
10	Sakado City FC (R)	18	4	4	10	20	31	−11	16	Relegated to Saitama Prefectural League

(C) Champions; (P) Promoted; (R) Relegated

== Hokushinetsu ==
=== Division 1 ===
Pos	Team	Pld	W	D	L	GF	GA	GD	Pts	Qualification or relegation
1	Artista Tomi (C)	14	12	1	1	53	4	+49	37	
2	Saurcos Fukui	14	11	2	1	45	4	+41	35	
3	Japan Soccer College	14	9	0	5	41	16	+25	27	
4	FC Hokuriku	14	6	1	7	15	27	−12	19	
5	Sakai Phoenix	14	5	2	7	19	21	−2	17	
6	Toyama Shinjo Club	14	4	1	9	12	55	−43	13	
7	FC Antelope Shiojiri (R)	14	3	0	11	13	30	−17	9	
8	FC Ueda Gentian (R)	14	2	1	11	12	53	−41	7	Relegated to Div. 2

(C) Champions; (R) Relegated

=== Division 2 ===
Pos	Team	Pld	W	D	L	GF	GA	GD	Pts	Promotion or relegation
1	Hokuriku Futures (C)	14	10	1	3	53	16	+37	31	
2	'09 Keidai FC (P)	14	10	1	3	45	19	+26	31	Promoted to Div. 1
3	Nakano Esperanza	14	8	1	5	30	30	0	25	
4	CUPS	14	7	2	5	31	33	−2	23	
5	AS Jamineiro	14	4	3	7	17	35	−18	15	
6	Teihens FC	14	4	2	8	22	34	−12	14	
7	Okuetsu FC (R)	14	3	3	8	16	29	−13	12	Relegated to Fukui Prefectural League
8	Valiente Toyama (R)	14	3	1	10	16	34	−18	10	Relegated to Toyama Prefectural League

(C) Champions; (P) Promoted; (R) Relegated

== Tōkai ==
=== Division 1 ===
Pos	Team	Pld	W	D	L	GF	GA	GD	Pts	Promotion or relegation
1	FC Kariya (C, Q)	14	13	1	0	43	7	+36	40	
2	FC Suzuka Rampole (Q)	14	10	2	2	38	17	+21	32	
3	Veertien Mie (Q, P)	14	9	3	2	43	18	+25	30	Promoted to JFL
4	FC Ise-Shima	14	7	2	5	25	26	−1	23	
5	FC Gifu Second	14	5	0	9	13	23	−10	15	
6	Chukyo University FC	14	3	2	9	16	32	−16	11	
7	Tokoha University FC	14	1	2	11	14	50	−36	5	
8	Fujieda City Hall SC (R)	14	0	4	10	19	38	−19	4	Relegated to Div. 2

(C) Champions; (P) Promoted; (Q) Qualified for the phase indicated; (R) Relegated

=== Division 2 ===
Pos	Team	Pld	W	D	L	GF	GA	GD	Pts	Promotion or relegation
1	Toyota Shukyu-dan (C, P)	14	12	1	1	41	13	+28	37	Promoted to Div. 1
2	Tokai Gakuen FC (P)	14	9	2	3	43	15	+28	29	Promoted to Div. 1
3	Yazaki Valente	14	8	5	1	24	10	+14	29	
4	Kasugai Club	14	4	4	6	20	31	−11	16	
5	Toyota Industries SC	14	3	4	7	22	28	−6	13	
6	Nagara Club	14	3	4	7	18	33	−15	13	
7	Nagoya SC	14	3	2	9	19	32	−13	11	
8	Daido Steel SC (R)	14	0	6	8	17	42	−25	6	Relegated to Aichi Prefectural League

(C) Champions; (P) Promoted; (R) Relegated

== Kansai ==
=== Division 1 ===
Pos	Team	Pld	W	D	L	GF	GA	GD	Pts	Qualification or relegation
1	Arterivo Wakayama (C, Q)	14	11	1	2	36	11	+25	34	
2	Amitie SC	14	11	1	2	36	12	+24	34	
3	Kansai FC 2008	14	6	4	4	24	16	+8	22	
4	Hannan University FC	14	5	5	4	16	17	−1	20	
5	Banditonce Kakogawa	14	4	7	3	15	16	−1	19	
6	Lagend Shiga FC	14	4	4	6	20	24	−4	16	
7	Renaiss School Koga (R)	14	2	2	10	14	38	−24	8	Relegated to Div. 2
8	Kyoto Shiko SC (R)	14	1	0	13	11	38	−27	3	Relegated to Div. 2

(C) Champions; (Q) Qualified for the phase indicated; (R) Relegated

=== Division 2 ===
Pos	Team	Pld	W	D	L	GF	GA	GD	Pts	Promotion or relegation
1	FC Tiamo Hirakata (C, P)	14	9	3	2	30	10	+20	30	Promoted to Div. 1
2	St. Andrew's University FC (P)	14	9	1	4	30	20	+10	28	Promoted to Div. 1
3	Diablossa Takada FC	14	9	1	4	34	25	+9	28	
4	AS Laranja Kyoto	14	7	3	4	28	19	+9	24	
5	Ain Foods	14	6	3	5	21	12	+9	21	
6	Takasago Mineiro	14	4	3	7	19	20	−1	15	
7	Kwansei Gakuin University Soccer Club (R)	14	3	1	10	21	41	−20	10	Relegation play-off Relegation to Hyogo Prefectural League
8	Kishiwada Club (R)	14	1	1	12	12	48	−36	4	Relegated to Osaka Prefectural League

(C) Champions; (P) Promoted; (R) Relegated

== Chūgoku ==
Pos	Team	Pld	W	D	L	GF	GA	GD	Pts	Qualification or relegation
1	SRC Hiroshima (C, Q)	18	12	5	1	54	15	+39	41	
2	Matsue City FC	18	12	4	2	48	16	+32	40	
3	Mitsubishi Motors Mizushima FC (Q)	18	10	2	6	49	25	+24	32	
4	IPU FC	18	9	4	5	48	31	+17	31	
5	JX Nippon Oil & Energy Mizushima FC	18	9	1	8	33	27	+6	28	
6	Dezzolla Shimane	18	7	2	9	28	33	−5	23	
7	HATSUKAICHI FC	18	7	1	10	37	48	−11	22	
8	NTN Okayama	18	6	3	9	20	36	−16	21	
9	Fuji Xerox Hiroshima S.C. (R)	18	6	2	10	25	36	−11	20	Relegated to Hiroshima Prefectural League
10	SC Tottori Dreams (R)	18	0	0	18	13	88	−75	0	Relegated to Tottori Prefectural League

(C) Champions; (Q) Qualified for the phase indicated; (R) Relegated

== Shikoku ==
Pos	Team	Pld	W	D	L	GF	GA	GD	Pts	Promotion or relegation
1	F.C. Imabari (C, Q, P)	14	13	0	1	64	7	+57	39	Promoted to JFL
2	Kōchi United SC	14	12	1	1	70	6	+64	37	
3	KUFC Nangoku	14	9	0	5	36	20	+16	27	
4	Tadotsu FC	14	5	2	7	17	33	−16	17	
5	FC Tokushima	14	4	1	9	12	45	−33	13	
6	Kagawa Takamatsu	14	4	1	9	11	44	−33	13	
7	Llamas Kochi FC	14	2	3	9	8	28	−20	9	
8	Nakamura Club (R)	14	2	2	10	10	45	−35	8	Relegated to Kochi Prefectural League

(C) Champions; (P) Promoted; (Q) Qualified for the phase indicated; (R) Relegated

== Kyushu ==
Pos	Team	Pld	W	PKW	PKL	L	GF	GA	GD	Pts	Result
1	J.FC Miyazaki (C, Q)	9	8	0	1	0	22	6	+16	25	
2	Tegevajaro Miyazaki	9	7	0	1	1	26	5	+21	22	
3	Nippon Steel Oita	9	6	1	0	2	27	9	+18	20	
4	Kyushu Mitsubishi Motors	9	6	1	0	2	21	22	−1	20	
5	FC Nakatsu	9	3	2	0	4	10	12	−2	13	
6	Kumamoto Teachers	9	3	1	1	4	22	22	0	12	
7	NIFS Kanoya Soccer Club	9	3	0	0	6	15	16	−1	9	
8	Kaiho Bank SC	9	2	0	1	6	10	27	−17	7	
9	Mitsubishi HI Nagasaki SC	9	1	0	1	7	6	19	−13	4	
10	Kagoshima United FC Second (R)	9	1	0	0	8	18	39	−21	3	Disbanded

(C) Champion; (Q) Qualified to the phase indicated; (R) Relegated
