= 2024 Japanese Regional Leagues =

Japanese amateur leagues football season

Japanese Regional Leagues
- Season: 2024
- Promoted: Asuka FC

The 2024 Japanese Regional Leagues (Japanese: 2024 地域リーグ, Hepburn: 2024 Chiiki Rīgu) was the 59th edition of the Japanese Regional Leagues, which comprises the fifth and sixth tier of the Japanese football league system. The winners of the first division of each Regional League, along with the three best-placed teams of the Shakaijin Cup, will qualify for the 2024 Regional Champions League, competing for a spot in the 2025 JFL. Currently, no changes were publicly presented from the 2023 format of JFL promotion.

== Champions list ==
Region	Champions
Hokkaido	Hokkaido Tokachi Sky Earth
Tohoku	Blancdieu Hirosaki
Kantō	Vonds Ichihara
Hokushin'etsu	Fukui United
Tōkai	FC Ise-Shima
Kansai	Asuka FC
Chūgoku	Fukuyama City
Shikoku	FC Tokushima
Kyushu	Veroskronos Tsuno

== Regional League Standings ==
=== Hokkaido ===
Pos	Team	Pld	W	D	L	GF	GA	GD	Pts	Qualification or relegation
1	Hokkaido Tokachi Sky Earth (C, Q)	14	13	1	0	71	8	+63	40	Qualified for the 2024 Regional Champions League
2	BTOP Hokkaido	14	9	3	2	78	16	+62	30	
3	Sapporo University Goal Plunderers	14	8	0	6	37	28	+9	24	
4	Norbritz Hokkaido	14	6	3	5	32	30	+2	21	
5	ASC Hokkaido	14	3	4	7	25	42	−17	13	
6	Canale Otaru	14	3	4	7	21	45	−24	13	
7	Hokushukai Iwamizawa (R)	14	2	3	9	26	69	−43	9	Relegated to Hokkaido Block Leagues
8	Kyokusyuukai FC (R)	14	2	2	10	12	64	−52	8	Relegated to Hokkaido Block Leagues

Updated to match(es) played on completed. Source: Soccerway, HFA
Rules for classification: 1) Points; 2) Goal difference; 3) Goals scored
(C) Champions; (Q) Qualified for the phase indicated; (R) Relegated

==== Results ====
Home \ Away	ASC	BTK	CAN	HKI	HTS	KYO	NOR	SGP
ASC Hokkaido		0–4	2–2	3–3	0–5	2–0	0–4	2–0
BTOP Hokkaido	8–1		10–1	13–1	0–0	12–0	4–0	2–3
Canale Otaru	4–4	1–1		0–5	0–4	1–0	1–4	1–2
Hokushukai Iwamizawa	2–2	2–12	0–4		0–4	4–2	0–8	3–5
Hokkaido Tokachi Sky Earth	4–1	5–2	7–1	7–0		6–0	6–2	4–0
Kyokusyuukai FC	2–1	1–4	2–2	0–10	3–2		2–2	0–4
Norbritz Hokkaido	0–4	1–1	3–1	2–2	1–4	4–0		1–0
Sapporo University Goal Plunderers	4–3	0–5	1–2	4–0	1–5	10–0	3–0	

Updated to match(es) played on 29 September 2024. Source: Soccerway
Legend: Blue = home team win; Yellow = draw; Red = away team win.

=== Tohoku ===
==== Division 1 ====
Pos	Team	Pld	W	D	L	GF	GA	GD	Pts	Qualification or relegation
1	Blancdieu Hirosaki (C, Q)	18	17	1	0	98	13	+85	52	Qualification for the 2024 Regional Champions League
2	Hitome Senbonzakura SUFT	18	13	2	3	57	11	+46	41	
3	Cobaltore Onagawa	18	13	2	3	50	10	+40	41	
4	Michinoku Sendai	18	9	3	6	27	22	+5	30	
5	Ganju Iwate	18	7	4	7	40	39	+1	25	
6	Shichigahama FC	18	7	1	10	35	38	−3	22	
7	Fuji Club 2003	18	7	0	11	39	45	−6	21	
8	La Universidad de Sendai II	18	6	0	12	38	47	−9	18	
9	Bogolle D. Tsugaru (R)	18	4	1	13	21	74	−53	13	Relegation to Tohoku Division 2 North
10	Morioka Zebra (R)	18	0	0	18	9	115	−106	0	Relegation to Tohoku Division 2 North

Updated to match(es) played on completed. Source: Soccerway, Tohoku FA
Rules for classification: 1) Points; 2) Goal difference; 3) Goals scored
(C) Champions; (Q) Qualified for the phase indicated; (R) Relegated

===== Results =====
Home \ Away	BLA	BOG	COB	FUJ	GAN	HIT	LUS	MIC	MOR	SHI
Blancdieu Hirosaki		9–0	1–0	6–1	5–3	2–1	7–3	3–1	12–0	3–0
Bogolle D. Tsugaru	1–7		0–4	0–5	0–7	1–8	1–4	1–4	4–1	2–1
Cobaltore Onagawa	1–2	9–0		3–1	4–2	0–1	4–0	1–1	4–0	3–1
Fuji Club 2003	1–5	5–3	0–1		3–0	0–4	3–2	0–1	9–0	3–1
Ganju Iwate	0–4	2–2	0–6	3–2		0–0	1–2	1–1	6–1	2–2
Hitome Senbonzakura SUFT	1–2	4–1	0–0	4–1	2–1		3–1	2–0	9–0	1–2
FC La Universidad de Sendai	0–6	1–0	1–2	5–2	2–3	0–1		1–3	8–0	1–2
Michinoku Sendai	0–0	1–0	0–2	3–1	0–1	0–4	2–0		4–0	3–2
Morioka Zebra	0–15	2–3	0–4	0–2	2–6	0–11	1–5	1–2		1–5
Shichigahama FC	0–9	0–2	0–2	4–0	1–2	0–1	6–2	2–1	6–0	

Updated to match(es) played on 13 October 2024. Source: Soccerway, Tohoku FA
Legend: Blue = home team win; Yellow = draw; Red = away team win.

==== Division 2 North ====
Pos	Team	Pld	W	D	L	GF	GA	GD	Pts	Qualification or relegation
1	Shichinohe SC (C, P)	16	13	1	2	56	19	+37	40	Promotion to Tohoku Division 1
2	Nippon Steel Kamaishi	16	11	2	3	58	24	+34	35	
3	TDK Shinwakai	16	9	2	5	56	33	+23	29	
4	Oshu United	16	9	2	5	43	26	+17	29	
5	Saruta Kogyo	16	8	2	6	40	27	+13	26	
6	Omiya SC	16	7	1	8	32	28	+4	22	
7	Akita FC Cambiare	16	6	1	9	34	33	+1	19	
8	Tono Club (R)	16	2	2	12	21	74	−53	8	Relegated to Iwate Prefectural League
9	Kuzumaki Club (R)	16	0	1	15	13	89	−76	1	Relegated to Iwate Prefectural League

Updated to match(es) played on completed. Source: Tohoku FA
Rules for classification: 1) Points; 2) Goal difference; 3) Goals scored
(C) Champions; (P) Promoted; (R) Relegated
- The top teams of the Aomori and Akita prefectural leagues declined to participate, so there was no entry match, and the Iwate Prefecture league champion Nu Pele Hiraizumi Maezawa was automatically promoted.
- Akita FC Cambiare was not relegated after the end of the season, as Morioka Zebra was not included in the 2025 schedule.

==== Division 2 South ====
Pos	Team	Pld	W	D	L	GF	GA	GD	Pts	Qualification or relegation
1	Sendai Sasuke	16	11	1	4	45	22	+23	34	Promotion to Tohoku Division 1
2	FC La U. de Sendai Second	16	9	5	2	53	20	+33	32	
3	Merry	16	8	5	3	33	19	+14	29	
4	RICOH Industry Tohoku	16	7	3	6	27	34	−7	24	
5	Primeiro Fukushima	16	6	4	6	34	39	−5	22	
6	Iwaki Furukawa	16	6	3	7	27	35	−8	21	
7	Oyama SC	16	5	4	7	31	20	+11	19	
8	Chaneaule Koriyama (O)	16	4	2	10	15	36	−21	14	Won the playoff (vs Miyagi Prefecture League Champion) and remain division.
9	Nakaniida SC (R)	16	1	3	12	12	52	−40	6	Relegated to Miyagi Prefectural League.

Updated to match(es) played on completed. Source: Tohoku FA
Rules for classification: 1) Points; 2) Goal difference; 3) Goals scored
(O) Play-off winners; (R) Relegated

==== Promotion Relegation Playoffs ====
December 1, 2024
10:45

Chaneaule Koriyama (Tohoku Division 2 South 9th)	2–1	Iris FC (Miyagi League champion)

Miyagi Co-op Megumino Soccer Stadium B Ground
December 1, 2024
13:00

FC Parafrente Yonezawa (Yamagata League champion)	6–0	Kitakata FC (Fukushima League champion)

Miyagi Co-op Megumino Soccer Stadium B Ground
- Chaneaule Koriyama retained their position in Division 2 South
- FC Parafrente Yonezawa were promoted to Division 2 South

=== Kantō ===
==== Division 1 ====
Division 1
Pos	Team	Pld	W	D	L	GF	GA	GD	Pts	Qualification or relegation
1	Vonds Ichihara (C, Q)	18	14	4	0	28	8	+20	46	Qualification for the 2024 Regional Champions League
2	Tokyo 23	18	12	3	3	47	16	+31	39	
3	Joyful Honda Tsukuba	18	8	5	5	27	26	+1	29	
4	Toho Titanium	18	7	3	8	28	27	+1	24	
5	Tokyo United	18	7	3	8	24	24	0	24	
6	Nankatsu SC	18	6	4	8	27	27	0	22	
7	Aries Toshima	18	5	4	9	25	32	−7	19	
8	Toin University of Yokohama FC	18	5	3	10	27	36	−9	18	
9	Tokyo International University FC (R)	18	4	6	8	20	31	−11	18	Relegated to Kanto Division 2
10	Vertfee Yaita (R)	18	4	1	13	13	39	−26	13	Relegated to Kanto Division 2

Updated to match(es) played on 6 October 2024. Source: GoalNote
Rules for classification: 1) Points; 2) Goal difference; 3) Goals scored
(C) Champions; (Q) Qualified for the phase indicated; (R) Relegated

==== Division 2 ====
Division 2
Pos	Team	Pld	W	D	L	GF	GA	GD	Pts	Qualification or relegation
1	RKD Ryugasaki (P)	18	13	3	2	37	14	+23	42	Promotion to Kanto Division 1
2	Nihon University N. (P)	18	12	1	5	29	14	+15	37	Promotion to Kanto Division 1
3	Tonan Maebashi	18	7	6	5	17	17	0	27	
4	Hitachi Building System SC	18	7	4	7	15	18	−3	25	
5	Coedo Kawagoe	18	6	6	6	23	23	0	24	
6	Atsugi Hayabusa	18	6	5	7	28	22	+6	23	
7	Esperanza SC	18	5	5	8	20	27	−7	20	
8	Yokohama Takeru	18	5	5	8	11	22	−11	20	
9	Sakai Trinitas (R)	18	3	5	10	11	22	−11	14	Relegated to Ibaraki Prefectural League
10	Aventura Kawaguchi (R)	18	2	8	8	19	31	−12	14	Relegated to Saitama Prefectural League

Updated to match(es) played on 6 October 2024. Source: GoalNote
Rules for classification: 1) Points; 2) Goal difference; 3) Goals scored
(P) Promoted; (R) Relegated

=== Hokushin'etsu ===
==== Division 1 ====
Pos	Team	Pld	W	D	L	GF	GA	GD	Pts	Qualification or relegation
1	Fukui United (C, Q)	14	14	0	0	64	7	+57	42	Qualified for the 2024 Regional Champions League
2	Toyama Shinjo	14	10	0	4	43	15	+28	30	
3	Japan Soccer College FC (Note: Japan Soccer College FC qualified for the Regional Champions League by reaching the final of the Shakaijin Cup.) (Q)	14	9	2	3	49	11	+38	29	Qualification for the 2024 Regional Champions League
4	Artista Asama	14	8	2	4	33	15	+18	26	
5	Niigata University H&W FC	14	6	1	7	27	23	+4	19	
6	Niigata University of Management FC	14	2	2	10	10	39	−29	8	
7	SR Komatsu (Note: SR Komatsu was supposed to be relegated to the second division, but NUHW FC, who finished first in the second division, could not be promoted due to regulations, so they remained in the first division.)	14	1	2	11	12	74	−62	5	
8	Sakai Phoenix (R)	14	1	1	12	7	61	−54	4	Relegated to Hokushin'etsu 2nd Division

Updated to match(es) played on Completed. Source: GoalNote
Rules for classification: 1) Points; 2) Goal difference; 3) Goals scored 4) Head-to-head records between the teams; a. Points; b. Goal difference; c. Total Score.
(C) Champions; (Q) Qualified for the phase indicated; (R) Relegated

==== Division 2 ====
Pos	Team	Pld	W	D	L	GF	GA	GD	Pts	Qualification or relegation
1	NUHW FC (Note: NUHW FC is linked to Niigata University of Health and Welfare FC, currently playing in Division 1. Therefore, they could not be promoted due to tournament regulations, and remained in Division 2.) (C)	14	13	0	1	58	13	+45	39	Cannot be promoted (see note)
2	FC Hokuriku (P)	14	9	1	4	39	13	+26	28	Promotion to Hokushin'etsu Division 1
3	Antelope Shiojiri	14	8	2	4	36	21	+15	26	
4	FC Matsucelona	14	8	1	5	36	24	+12	25	
5	CUPS Seiro	14	6	2	6	33	26	+7	20	
6	N-Style Toyama	14	4	1	9	19	39	−20	13	
7	Libertas Chikuma (R)	14	3	2	9	19	41	−22	11	Relegated to Nagano Prefectural League
8	LionPower Komatsu (R)	14	0	1	13	13	76	−63	1	Relegated to Ishikawa Prefectural League

Updated to match(es) played on 22 September 2024. Source: GoalNote
Rules for classification: 1) Points; 2) Goal difference; 3) Goals scored; 4) Head-to-head record between the teams a. Points; b. goal difference; c. Total Score
(C) Champions; (P) Promoted; (R) Relegated

=== Tōkai ===
==== Division 1 ====
Pos	Team	Pld	W	D	L	GF	GA	GD	Pts	Qualification or relegation
1	FC Ise-Shima (C, Q)	14	12	1	1	30	10	+20	37	Qualification for the 2024 Regional Champions League
2	FC Kariya (Q)	14	10	1	3	29	14	+15	31	Qualification for the 2024 Regional Champions League
3	Wyvern FC	14	8	1	5	21	15	+6	25	
4	Chukyo University FC	14	7	0	7	17	17	0	21	
5	Gakunan F. Mosuperio	14	6	1	7	23	20	+3	19	
6	Fujieda City Hall	14	4	1	9	13	27	−14	13	
7	Yazaki Valente (R)	14	3	2	9	14	22	−8	11	Relegation to Tokai Division 2
8	Sports & Society Izu (R)	14	2	1	11	12	34	−22	7	Relegation to Tokai Division 2

Updated to match(es) played on 12 October 2024. Source: Soccerway, Tokai SL
Rules for classification: 1) Points; 2) Goal difference; 3) Goals scored 4) Head-to-head record between the teams: 5) Winning percentage (total number of wins ÷ total matches)
(C) Champions; (Q) Qualified for the phase indicated; (R) Relegated

==== Division 2 ====
Pos	Team	Pld	W	D	L	GF	GA	GD	Pts	Qualification or relegation
1	AS Kariya (P)	14	10	2	2	28	14	+14	32	Promotion to Tokai Division 1
2	Vencedor Mie (P)	14	8	3	3	31	20	+11	27	Promotion to Tokai Division 1
3	Chukyo Univ.FC	14	6	3	5	19	16	+3	21	
4	FC Gifu Second	14	5	2	7	13	23	−10	17	
5	Tokai Gakuen University FC	14	5	1	8	21	29	−8	16	
6	Tokai FC	14	4	3	7	29	27	+2	15	
7	Nagara Club (R)	14	4	3	7	22	26	−4	15	Relegated to Gifu Prefectural League
8	Tokoha University FC (R)	14	3	5	6	26	34	−8	14	Relegated to Shizuoka Prefectural League

Updated to match(es) played on 20 October 2024. Source: Tokai SL
Rules for classification: 1) Points; 2) Goal difference; 3) Goals scored 4) Head-to-head record between the teams: 5) Winning percentage (total number of wins ÷ total matches)
(P) Promoted; (R) Relegated

=== Kansai ===
==== Division 1 ====
Pos	Team	Pld	W	D	L	GF	GA	GD	Pts	Qualification or relegation
1	Asuka FC (C, P)	14	8	4	2	19	9	+10	28	Promotion to Japan Football League
2	Cento Cuore Harima	14	6	6	2	23	13	+10	24	
3	Arterivo Wakayama	14	6	6	2	21	13	+8	24	
4	Moriyama Samurai 2000	14	5	4	5	20	17	+3	19	
5	Basara Hyogo	14	5	4	5	24	23	+1	19	
6	Lagend Shiga	14	4	3	7	14	21	−7	15	
7	FC AWJ (Note: FC AWJ remained in the first division, due to Asuka FC's promotion to the JFL)	14	3	5	6	16	23	−7	14	
8	Hannan University Club (R)	14	1	4	9	14	32	−18	7	Relegation to Division 2

Updated to match(es) played on 12 October 2024. Source: Soccerway, GoalNote
Rules for classification: 1) Points; 2) Goal difference; 3) Goals scored 4) Head-to-head records between the teams; a. Points; b. goal difference; c. Total Score.
(C) Champions; (P) Promoted; (R) Relegated

==== Division 2 ====
This is the 20th edition of the Kansai Football League Division 2.

Pos	Team	Pld	W	D	L	GF	GA	GD	Pts	Qualification or relegation
1	Laranja Kyoto (C, P)	14	10	3	1	33	13	+20	33	Promotion to Division 1
2	Kobe FC 1970 (P)	14	7	2	5	20	20	0	23	Promotion to Division 1
3	St. Andrews FC	14	6	3	5	29	19	+10	21	
4	Osaka Korean	14	6	3	5	21	28	−7	21	
5	Kansai FC 2008	14	5	4	5	18	13	+5	19	
6	Ococias Kyoto	14	5	4	5	24	21	+3	19	
7	Kyoto Shiko SC (Note: Kyoto Shiko SC was supposed to participate in the play-off match against the runner-up in the prefectural finals, but due to the promotion of Asuka FC to the JFL, they remained in the second division without playing a play-off.)	14	3	2	9	13	23	−10	11	
8	AC Middlerange (O)	14	2	3	9	12	33	−21	9	Won the Play-off match & retained their position.

Updated to match(es) played on 13 October 2024. Source: GoalNote
Rules for classification: 1) Points; 2) Goal difference; 3) Goals scored 4) Head-to-head records between the teams; a. Points; b. Goal difference; c. Total score.
(C) Champions; (O) Play-off winners; (P) Promoted

==== Relegation/promotion Playoff ====
18 January 2025
13:00

AC Middlerange (Kansai Soccer League Division 2 8th place)	2–1	Eveil FC (Kansai Regional League Promotion Championship runner-up)
	Report

Yanmar Field Nagai

=== Chūgoku ===
Pos	Team	Pld	W	D	L	GF	GA	GD	Pts	Qualification or relegation
1	Fukuyama City (C, Q)	18	14	3	1	71	13	+58	45	Qualification for the 2024 Regional Champions League
2	SRC Hiroshima	18	11	4	3	35	14	+21	37	
3	Belugarosso Iwami	18	10	5	3	45	17	+28	35	
4	Baleine Shimonoseki	18	10	2	6	45	24	+21	32	
5	Mitsubishi Mizushima	18	9	3	6	29	18	+11	30	
6	International Pacific Univ. FC	18	7	3	8	44	25	+19	24	
7	Hatsukaichi FC	18	7	2	9	23	50	−27	23	
8	Yonago Genki	18	6	1	11	28	40	−12	19	
9	Banmel Tottori (O)	18	2	1	15	15	88	−73	7	Playoff vs Chugoku Prefectural Finals runner's up and retained their position
10	NTN Okayama (R)	18	2	0	16	14	60	−46	6	Relegated to Okayama Prefectural League

Updated to match(es) played on 29 September 2024. Source: Soccerway, CSL
Rules for classification: 1) Points; 2) Goal difference; 3) Goals scored
(C) Champions; (O) Play-off winners; (Q) Qualified for the phase indicated; (R) Relegated

==== Promotion/relegation playoff ====
December 8, 2024
11:00

Banmel Tottori (Chugoku Football League 9th place)	3–0	Shudai Club (Chugoku Regional League Promotion Championship runner-up)

Axis Bird Stadium

=== Shikoku ===
Pos	Team	Pld	W	D	L	GF	GA	GD	Pts	Qualification or relegation
1	FC Tokushima (C, Q)	14	13	0	1	73	14	+59	39	Qualification for the 2024 Regional Champions League
2	Tadotsu FC	14	11	1	2	46	18	+28	34	
3	Sonio Takamatsu	14	7	1	6	29	24	+5	22	
4	Lvnirosso NC	14	7	1	6	30	30	0	22	
5	KUFC Nankoku	14	6	2	6	26	26	0	20	
6	R.Velho Takamatsu	14	6	2	6	24	24	0	20	
7	Llamas Kochi (ja) (O)	14	1	1	12	7	33	−26	4	Participated in the play-off match (vs Shikoku Challenge runners-up) and retained their place.
8	Nakamura Club (R)	14	0	2	12	5	71	−66	2	Relegated to Kōchi Prefectural League

Updated to match(es) played on 29 September 2024. Source: Soccerway, GoalNote
Rules for classification: 1) Points; 2) Goal difference; 3) Goals scored
(C) Champions; (O) Play-off winners; (Q) Qualified for the phase indicated; (R) Relegated

==== Promotion/relegation playoff ====
19 January 2025
13:30

Llamas Kochi (ja) （Shikoku League 7th-place）	6–0	FC Unity Tokushima (Shikoku League Promotion Championship runner-up)

Sports Park Sakawa
26 January 2025

FC Unity Tokushima (Shikoku League Promotion Championship runner-up)	2–10	Llamas Kochi (ja) （Shikoku League 7th-place）

Tokushima Sports Village

=== Kyushu ===
Pos	Team	Pld	W	D	L	GF	GA	GD	Pts	Qualification or relegation
1	Veroskronos Tsuno (C, Q)	18	16	1	1	67	8	+59	49	Qualification for the 2024 Regional Champions League
2	J-Lease FC (Q)	18	13	3	2	58	16	+42	42	Qualification for the 2024 Regional Champions League.
3	Nobeoka Agata	18	13	1	4	66	16	+50	40	
4	Brew Kashima	18	10	1	7	36	35	+1	31	
5	KMG Holdings	18	9	3	6	42	31	+11	30	
6	Kawasoe Club	18	7	2	9	22	42	−20	23	
7	Nippon Steel Oita SC	18	5	2	11	23	47	−24	17	
8	Itazuke FC	18	3	3	12	15	51	−36	12	
9	NIFS Kanoya FC (O)	18	2	3	13	9	40	−31	9	Participation in the play-off match and retained their status.
10	Kaiho Bank (R)	18	1	3	14	15	67	−52	6	Relegated to Okinawa Prefectural League

Updated to match(es) played on 8 September 2024. Source: Soccerway, Kyushu SL
Rules for classification: 1) Points; 2) Goal difference; 3) Goals scored
(C) Champions; (O) Play-off winners; (Q) Qualified for the phase indicated; (R) Relegated

==== Results ====
Home \ Away	BRE	ITA	JLE	KAI	KAN	KAW	KMG	NOB	NSO	VER
Brew Kashima		2–1	1–3	4–0	1–0	2–1	5–3	2–0	6–2	0–2
Itazuke FC	1–0		1–9	1–1	1–1	2–1	1–2	0–5	1–2	0–3
J-Lease FC	7–1	2–1		6–0	4–0	2–0	1–2	2–1	3–3	2–2
Kaiho Bank	1–2	0–0	0–5		1–2	3–4	2–6	0–3	1–2	0–14
NIFS Kanoya FC	0–5	2–3	1–1	0–0		0–1	0–1	0–6	0–1	1–4
Kawasoe Club	2–1	1–0	0–1	2–3	1–0		2–2	0–5	1–1	1–5
KMG Holdings	1–1	7–1	0–2	1–0	3–1	1–2		1–1	5–1	0–2
Nobeoka Agata	7–1	3–1	2–1	4–1	6–0	9–0	5–2		7–0	1–3
Nippon Steel Oita SC	1–2	3–0	0–5	5–2	0–1	1–2	1–5	0–1		0–2
Veroskronos Tsuno	3–0	7–0	1–2	6–0	1–0	4–1	3–0	2–0	3–0	

Updated to match(es) played on 8 September 2024. Source: Kyushu Soccer League, Soccerway
Legend: Blue = home team win; Yellow = draw; Red = away team win.

==== Promotion/relegation playoff ====
19 January 2025
12:00

NIFS Kanoya FC （Kyushu Football League 9th place）	2–1	FC Seriole (Okinawa) (Kyushu Football League Promotion Championship runner-up)

Kanoya University of Physical Education Soccer Field, Saga
