= Shikoku Soccer League =

- Founded: 1977; 49 years ago
- Country: Japan
- Confederation: AFC
- Divisions: 1
- Number of clubs: 8
- Level on pyramid: 5
- Promotion to: Japan Football League
- Relegation to: Prefectural Leagues
- Domestic cup(s): Emperor's Cup; All Japan Senior Football Championship
- Current champions: FC Tokushima (2024)
- Most championships: Teijin SC (10)
- Website: www.shikoku-sl.net
- Current: 2026 Japanese Regional Leagues

Shikoku Soccer League (四国サッカーリーグ, Shikoku Sakkā Rīgu) is the Japanese fifth tier of league football, which is part of the Japanese Regional Leagues. It covers the four prefectures that comprise the island of Shikoku: Kagawa, Tokushima, Ehime and Kōchi.

== 2026 clubs ==
#	Club	Hometown	Notes
1	KUFC Nankoku	Nankoku, Kōchi	
2	Llamas Kochi	Kōchi, Kōchi	Remained in the division after winning play-off game.
3	Lvnirosso NC	Niihama, Ehime	
4	Alverio Takamatsu	Takamatsu, Kagawa	
5	SONIO Takamatsu	Takamatsu, Kagawa	
6	Tadotsu Football Club	Nakatado, Kagawa	
7	FC Tokushima	Yoshinogawa, Tokushima	
8	MSP Yashima FC	Yashima, Kagawa	Promoted as champions of the Shikoku League Challenge Team Finals.

== Shikoku Soccer League Champions ==
Edition	Year	Winner
1	1977	Showa Club (1)
2	1978	Otsuka Pharmaceutical (1)
3	1979	Otsuka Pharmaceutical (2)
4	1980	Nangoku Club (1)
5	1981	Otsuka Pharmaceutical (3)
6	1982	Aiyu Club (1)
7	1983	Teijin SC (1)
8	1984	Teijin SC (2)
9	1985	Teijin SC (3)
10	1986	Teijin SC (4)
11	1987	Teijin SC (5)
12	1988	NTT West Shikoku (1)
13	1989	Otsuka Pharmaceutical (4)
14	1990	Teijin SC (6)
15	1991	Teijin SC (7)
16	1992	NTT West Shikoku (2)
17	1993	Teijin SC (8)
18	1994	Kagawa Shiun (1)
19	1995	Teijin SC (9)
20	1996	Teijin SC (10)
21	1997	Kamatamare Sanuki (2)
22	1998	Ehime FC (1)
23	1999	Ehime FC (2)
24	2000	Ehime FC (3)
25	2001	Igosso Kochi FC (2)
26	2002	Igosso Kochi FC (3)
27	2003	Igosso Kochi FC (4)
28	2004	Igosso Kochi FC (5)
29	2005	Igosso Kochi FC (6)
30	2006	Kamatamare Sanuki (3)
31	2007	Tokushima Vortis Reserves (1)
32	2008	Kamatamare Sanuki (4)
33	2009	Tokushima Vortis Reserves (2)
34	2010	Kamatamare Sanuki (5)
35	2011	Ehime FC Shimanami (1)
36	2012	FC Imabari (2)
37	2013	FC Imabari (3)
38	2014	Kochi U Torastar (1)
39	2015	FC Imabari (4)
40	2016	FC Imabari (5)
41	2017	Kochi United (1)
42	2018	Kochi United (2)
43	2019	Kochi United (3)
44	2020	FC Tokushima (1)
45	2021	Cancelled due to the COVID-19 pandemic
46	2022	FC Tokushima (2)
47	2023	FC Tokushima (3)
48	2024	FC Tokushima (4)
49	2025	FC Tokushima (5)
50	2026	
