= Tokyo 23 FC =

Japanese football club

Tokyo 23 FC 東京23FC
- Full name: Tokyo 23 Football Club
- Nickname: Tokyo 23
- Founded: 2003; 22 years ago
- Ground: Edogawa Stadium; Edogawa, Tokyo
- Capacity: 6,950
- Chairman: Mitsuhiro Tomomechi
- Manager: Yuki Komatsu
- League: Kantō Soccer League (Div. 1)
- 2024: 2nd of 10
- Website: https://tokyo23fc.jp
Home colours	Away colours

Tokyo 23 Football Club (東京23フットボールクラブ, Tōkyō Ni-Jū San Futtobōrukurabu) commonly known as Tokyo 23 FC (東京23FC, Tōkyō Ni-Jū San Efushi) is a Japanese football club based in the 23 special wards of Tokyo. Their motto is "Tokyo Pride" (Be Pride of the Tokyoites). The club now participates in the first division of Kantō Soccer League, which part of Japanese Regional Leagues, the fifth tier of the Japanese football league system and they're aiming towards pro football.

== History ==
=== Establishment ===
Tokyo 23 Football Club was established as Sagawa Tokyo 23 Soccer Club in 2003.

=== Tokyo League ===
Tokyo 23 FC was promoted to Division 1 in 2006, but they hovered around 7th to 11th position until 2010 for 4 years.

On 3 February 2010, Tokyo 23 Corporation. was established for management. In April 2010, Tokyo 23 Soccer Club was renamed to Tokyo 23 FC.

On 15 January 2012, Tokyo 23 FC fought against Tonan Maebashi Satellite to be raised to Kanto Soccer League 2nd Division, and Tokyo 23 FC won by 1–0.

=== Kanto Soccer League ===
On 7 October 2012, Tokyo 23 won the Kanto Soccer League's 2nd Division, three points clear off runners-up Hitachi Building System SC.

In 2016, Tokyo 23 were crowned champions of the Kantō division one, beating Vonds Ichihara by eight points and qualified for The National Regional Football Champions League for the first and only time. They finished second in their group behind Suzuka Unlimited and failed to qualify for the final phase of the competition.

== League record ==
Champions	Runners-up	Third place	Promoted	Relegated

League											Emperor's Cup	Shakaijin Cup
Season	League	Pos	P	W	D	L	F	A	GD	Pts	Emperor's Cup	Shakaijin Cup
2012	Kanto Soccer League (Div. 2)	1st	18	12	3	3	48	22	26	39		
2013	Kanto Soccer League (Div. 1)	4th	18	9	2	7	50	32	18	29		
2014	Kanto Soccer League (Div. 1)	2nd	18	10	6	2	36	17	19	39		
2015	Kanto Soccer League (Div. 1)	4th	18	9	5	4	40	20	20	32		
2016	Kanto Soccer League (Div. 1)	1st	18	14	2	2	36	18	18	44		
2017	Kanto Soccer League (Div. 1)	4th	18	7	6	5	28	21	7	27		
2018	Kanto Soccer League (Div. 1)	4th	18	6	7	5	23	21	2	25		
2019	Kanto Soccer League (Div. 1)	8th	18	5	3	10	20	33	-13	18		
2020 ‡	Kanto Soccer League (Div. 1)	8th	9	2	3	4	6	14	-8	9		
2021	Kanto Soccer League (Div. 1)	5th	22	11	3	8	36	25	11	36		
2022	Kanto Soccer League (Div. 1)	3rd	18	10	2	6	30	23	7	32		
2023	Kanto Soccer League (Div. 1)	9th	18	5	6	7	30	36	-6	21		
2024	Kanto Soccer League (Div. 1)	2nd	18	12	3	3	47	16	31	39		
2025	Kanto Soccer League (Div. 1)	6th	18	5	6	7	21	23	-2	21		Semi-final
2026	Kanto Soccer League (Div. 1)	TBD	18									

Key

- P = Games played; W = Games won; D = Games drawn; L = Games lost; F = Goals for; A = Goals against; GD = Goal difference; Pts = Points gained
- ‡ Due to the spread of the new coronavirus, all matches of the first half 1st ~ 9 matches of the first half were cancelled, and only the second half schedule was held. COVID-19 pandemic in Japan

== Honours ==
Tokyo 23 FC honours
Honour	No.	Years	Ref
Tokyo Shakaijin Soccer League Division 4 Block 19	1	2003	
Tokyo Shakaijin Soccer League Division 3 Block 6	1	2004	
Tokyo Shakaijin Soccer League Division 2	1	2005	
Tokyo Shakaijin Soccer League Division 1	2	2010, 2011	
Shakaijin Cup	1	2011	
Kantō Soccer League Ichihara Cup	1	2012	
Kantō Soccer League Div. 2	1	2012	
Kantō Soccer League Div. 1	1	2016	

== Current squad ==
As of 23 August 2023.

Note: Flags indicate national team as defined under FIFA eligibility rules; some limited exceptions apply. Players may hold more than one non-FIFA nationality.

No.	Pos.	Nation	Player
1	GK	JPN	Naoki Yoshikawa
2	DF	JPN	Hayato Shibata
3	DF	JPN	Seiji Shindo
4	DF	JPN	Daiki Sakanoue
5	DF	JPN	Kenta Naito
6	MF	JPN	Tappei Oki
7	MF	JPN	Dai Takahashi
8	MF	JPN	Kohei Kikuchi
9	FW	JPN	Hikaru Shimizu
10	MF	JPN	Koki Wakasugi
11	FW	JPN	Konosuke Wada
13	FW	JPN	Sotaro Murakami
14	MF	JPN	Keita Nagato
15	MF	JPN	Ryuhei Tanabe
16	MF	JPN	Hayate Kobayashi
17	MF	JPN	Shogo Oya

No.	Pos.	Nation	Player
18	FW	JPN	Shun Higashi
19	FW	JPN	Yuga Harashina
20	DF	JPN	Yui Shikida
21	GK	JPN	Fumiya Oishi
22	DF	JPN	Kazuya Miyata
24	MF	JPN	Kentaro Matsumoto
25	MF	JPN	Motoki Kanda
26	DF	JPN	Ryotaro Maeda
27	MF	JPN	Ryoma Shimizu
28	DF	JPN	Rikuya Iwanaga
29	DF	JPN	Akihiro Kawasaki
31	GK	JPN	Hiroto Takayasu
32	DF	JPN	Ryuji Ito
33	DF	JPN	Chihiro Tajima
34	MF	JPN	Haruki Okajima
44	MF	JPN	Makoto Okamoto
