= Masashi Otani =

Japanese footballer

Personal information
- Date of birth: 14 June 1994 (age 32)
- Place of birth: Yamaguchi, Japan
- Height: 1.84 m (6 ft 0 in)
- Position: Midfielder

Team information
- Current team: Iwate Grulla Morioka
- Number: 20

Youth career
- 2010–2012: Sanfrecce Hiroshima
- 2013–2016: Komazawa University

Senior career*
Years	Team	Apps	(Gls)
2017	FK Mladost	4	(0)
2017–2019	FK Kom	20	(2)
2019	Criacao Shinjuku	12	(11)
2020–	Iwate Grulla Morioka	7	(0)
- * Club domestic league appearances and goals as of 17:04, 12 November 2020 (UTC)

Masashi Otani (大谷 真史, Otani Masashi; born 14 June 1994) is a Japanese footballer currently playing as a midfielder for Iwate Grulla Morioka.

== Career statistics ==
=== Club ===
As of 12 November 2020.

Club	Season	League			National Cup		League Cup		Other		Total	
Club	Season	Division	Apps	Goals	Apps	Goals	Apps	Goals	Apps	Goals	Apps	Goals
FK Mladost	2016–17	Montenegrin First League	4	0	0	0	–		0	0	4	0
FK Kom	2017–18	Montenegrin First League	20	2	1 (Note: Appearance(s) in Montenegrin Cup)	0	–		0	0	21	2
Criacao Shinjuku	2019	Kantō Soccer League	12	11	0	0	–		0	0	12	11
Iwate Grulla Morioka	2020	J3 League	7	0	0	0	–		0	0	7	0
Career total			43	13	1	0	0	0	0	0	44	13
