= FC Ise-Shima =

Japanese football club

Football Club.Ise-Shima
- Full name: FC.Ise-Shima
- Founded: 2013; 12 years ago
- Ground: Ise Football Village; Ise, Mie
- Capacity: 900
- Chairman: Takafumi Ogura
- Manager: Takafumi Ogura
- League: Tōkai Adult Soccer League Div.1
- 2025: 2nd of 8
- Website: fc-iseshima.org

FC.Ise-Shima (FC.伊勢志摩, FC.Ise Shima) is a Japanese professional football club based in Ise, Mie Prefecture. They play in Tōkai Adult Soccer League, the fifth tier of Japanese football.

== History ==
The club was founded on 2006 as Pixy BC. Former player Ichizo Nakata contributed in the club relocation to the Ise City, making it their new hometown at the Mie Prefecture.

It led the club to be renamed as FC Ise-Shima on 2013, when the club was playing on Mie's 2nd division. The club saw three back-to-back promotions from prefectural to regional level, debuting at the first division of the Tōkai Adult Soccer League on 2016. The club has not been relegated or had even been outside of the Top 4 ever since. They had the opportunity to be promoted to the Japan Football League a couple of times through the Japanese Regional Football Champions League, even finishing at fourth place at the 2021 edition of the competition. However, it was not enough to give them promotion.

== League & cup record ==
Champions	Runners-up	Third place	Promoted	Relegated

League											Emperor's Cup	Shakaijin Cup
Season	Division	Pos	P	W	D	L	F	A	GD	Pts	Emperor's Cup	Shakaijin Cup
As Pixy BC
2006	Mie Prefectural; League (Div. 1)	2nd	12	7	2	3	32	17	15	23	Did not qualify	Did not qualify
2007	Mie Prefectural; League (Div. 2)	4th	13	6	3	4	22	21	1	21	Did not qualify	Did not qualify
2008	Mie Prefectural; League (Div. 2)	1st	11	8	1	2	32	16	16	25	Did not qualify	Did not qualify
2009	Mie Prefectural; League (Div. 1)	5th	12	6	1	5	14	19	-5	19	Did not qualify	Did not qualify
2010	Mie Prefectural; League (Div. 1)	3rd	14	6	4	4	26	19	7	22	Did not qualify	Did not qualify
2011	Mie Prefectural; League (Div. 1)	3rd	14	6	3	2	30	11	19	21	Did not qualify	Did not qualify
2012	Mie Prefectural; League (Div. 1)	7th	14	6	0	8	25	47	-22	18	Did not qualify	Did not qualify
As FC Ise-Shima
2013	Mie Prefectural; League (Div. 2)	1st	14	12	2	0	118	7	111	38	Did not qualify	Did not qualify
2014	Mie Prefectural; League (Div. 1)	2nd	14	10	1	3	82	10	72	33	Did not qualify	Did not qualify
2015	Tōkai Adult; Soccer League (Div. 2)	2nd	14	8	5	1	45	16	29	29	Did not qualify	Did not qualify
2016	Tōkai Adult; Soccer League (Div. 1)	4th	14	7	2	5	25	26	-1	23	Did not qualify	1st round
2017	Tōkai Adult; Soccer League (Div. 1)	3rd	14	8	1	5	30	20	10	25	Did not qualify	1st round
2018	Tōkai Adult; Soccer League (Div. 1)	4th	14	6	1	7	21	30	-9	19	Did not qualify	Did not qualify
2019	Tōkai Adult; Soccer League (Div. 1)	2nd	14	11	1	2	39	15	24	34	Did not qualify	Round of 16
2020	Tōkai Adult; Soccer League (Div. 1)	The league season was cancelled due to extended measures regarding COVID-19.									Did not qualify	Was not held
2021	Tōkai Adult; Soccer League (Div. 1)	2nd	5	3	1	1	13	1	12	10	Did not qualify	Was not held
2022	Tōkai Adult; Soccer League (Div. 1)	3rd	16	9	4	3	26	16	10	31	Did not qualify	Did not qualify
2023	Tōkai Adult; Soccer League (Div. 1)	3rd	14	6	3	5	19	17	2	21	Did not qualify	Did not qualify
2024	Tōkai Adult; Soccer League (Div. 1)	1st	14	12	1	1	30	10	20	37	Did not qualify	Did not qualify
2025	Tōkai Adult; Soccer League (Div. 1)	2nd	14	9	1	4	26	16	10	28	Did not qualify	
2026	Tōkai Adult; Soccer League (Div. 1)											

Key

- Pos. = Position in league; P = Games played; W = Games won; D = Games drawn; L = Games lost; F = Goals scored; A = Goals conceded; GD = Goal difference; Pts = Points won

== Honours ==
FC Ise-Shima honours
Honour	No.	Years
Mie Prefecture League Division 2	2	2008, 2013
Tokai Adult Soccer Tournament	1	2014
Tokai Adult Soccer League	1	2024

== Current squad ==
As of 23 August 2023.

Note: Flags indicate national team as defined under FIFA eligibility rules; some limited exceptions apply. Players may hold more than one non-FIFA nationality.

No.	Pos.	Nation	Player
1	GK	JPN	Yuto Wada
2	DF	JPN	Hayato Nakahama
3	DF	JPN	Masaki Horita
4	MF	JPN	Rikito Taniguchi
5	DF	KOR	Song Jun-su
7	MF	JPN	Yuto Miyadera
8	MF	JPN	Yuya Mori
9	DF	JPN	Riku Oikawa
11	FW	JPN	Yuki Takahashi
13	MF	JPN	Tetsuya Nakano
14	FW	JPN	Ryoki Nishiguchi
15	MF	JPN	Mahiro Shinabe
16	GK	JPN	Tetsuya Kobayashi

No.	Pos.	Nation	Player
17	FW	JPN	Akinori Taniguchi
18	DF	JPN	Kazumi Furuya
19	FW	JPN	Shimon Sato
20	MF	JPN	Yuya Ito
21	MF	JPN	Enishi Mori
22	MF	JPN	Atsuya Yamada
23	FW	JPN	Hayato Iijima
24	MF	JPN	Itaru Umeda
26	DF	JPN	Koji Sakaba
27	DF	JPN	Masaki Motohiro
30	MF	JPN	Bilal Masayuki Sugiyama
31	GK	JPN	Tasuku Masuda

== Club staff ==
Position	Name
Manager & Chairman	(Japan) Takafumi Ogura
Head coach	(Japan) Tomoya Kanamori
Goalkeeper coach	(Japan) Akitoshi Araki
Trainer	(Japan) Takumi Nishikawa
Competent	(Japan) Jun Hagitani

== See also ==
- Japan Football Association (JFA)
