= Cobaltore Onagawa =

Japanese football club

Cobaltore Onagawa コバルトーレ女川
- Full name: Cobaltore Onagawa
- Nicknames: Cobaltore; Cobal
- Founded: 2006; 19 years ago
- Ground: WACK Onagawa Stadium, Onagawa, Miyagi
- Capacity: 5,000
- Manager: Masahiro Kuzuno
- League: Tohoku Soccer League
- 2025: 1st of 10
- Website: cobaltore.com
Home colours	Away colours

Cobaltore Onagawa (コバルトーレ女川, Kobarutōre Onagawa) is a football club based in Onagawa, Oshika District, Miyagi Prefecture, Japan. They play in the Tohoku Soccer League, which is part of Japanese Regional Leagues.

== Club name ==
The name Cobaltore is a portmanteau several words, mostly borrowed from European languages the combination of two Spanish words: cobalto, referring to the image of the blue sea (cobalt blue) of Onagawa and the rich natural forest (Faure), and the emblem is a design of a sea cat dancing in the golden morning sun shining in the shape of a "woman" in Onagawa., and floresta, meaning "forest".

== History ==
The club was established in April 2006 and initially managed by former Japan NT member Nobuo Fujishima, the name of the club resembles the true nature of the region in Miyagi Prefecture and today Cobaltore is still one of the clubs aiming to J. League and professional football. It was founded by the local community, formed by people who wanted to stay in the city instead of leaving for Sendai or Tokyo. The club rapidly grew, climbing the Japanese football pyramid in five years.

The 2011 Tohoku earthquake was devastating both for the region and the club: Onagawa lost 1300 citizens, one tenth of the city's population, and the club's office was destroyed. However, all players escaped death and many of them became the core of the club.

Despite the strong shock and skipping the 2011 season due to damages and the impossibility of using their own stadium, which was used as a shelter, Cobaltore players - especially the Japanese - remained in town to give a hand to the city that hosted their careers. The group of Onagawa Supporters pushed back the club into the pitch and - for 2012 season - Cobaltore returned on the field.

Thanks to Fukushima United FC going to Japan Football League, Cobaltore joined Tohoku Soccer League first division for 2013 season. From then, Cobaltore is trying to reach JFL, aiming towards pro-football. They also won the division in 2016. After repeating the title in 2017 and winning the Regional Promotion Series, they were promoted to JFL but only lasted one season before going back down.

== Stadium ==
Cobaltore Onagawa plays its matches at the Onagawa Town Comprehensive Athletic Park.

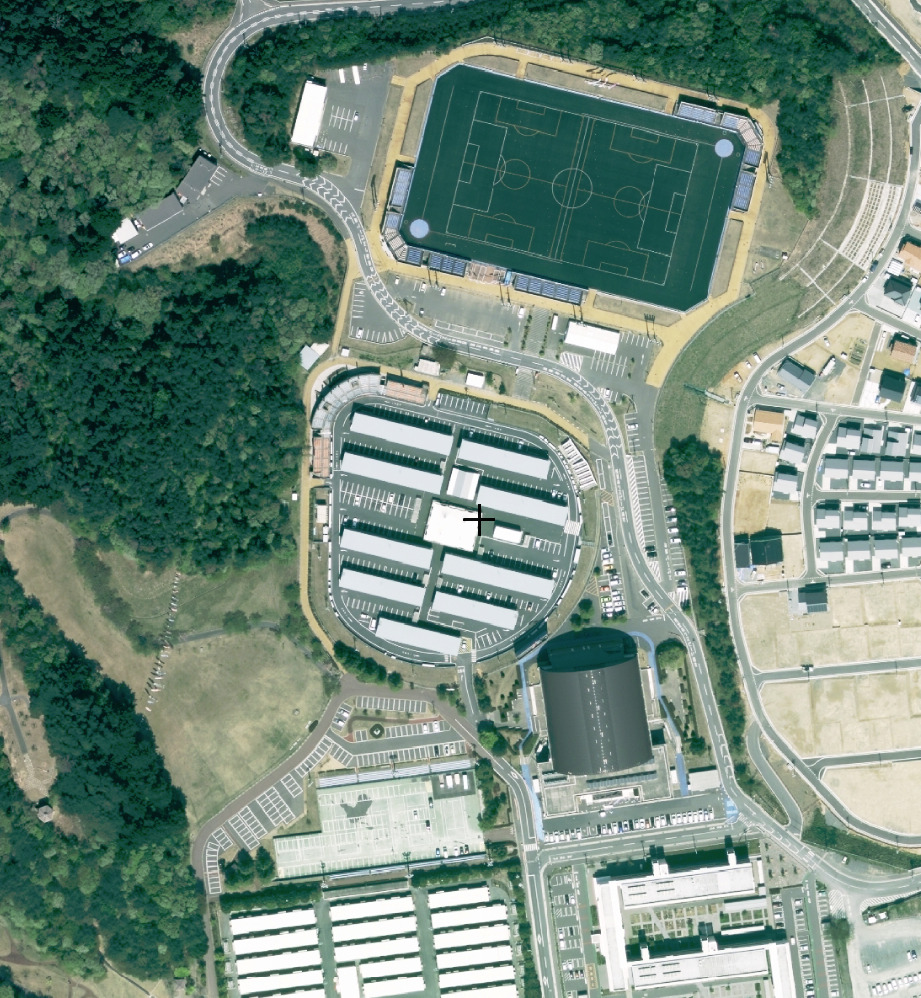
Onagawa Sports Park

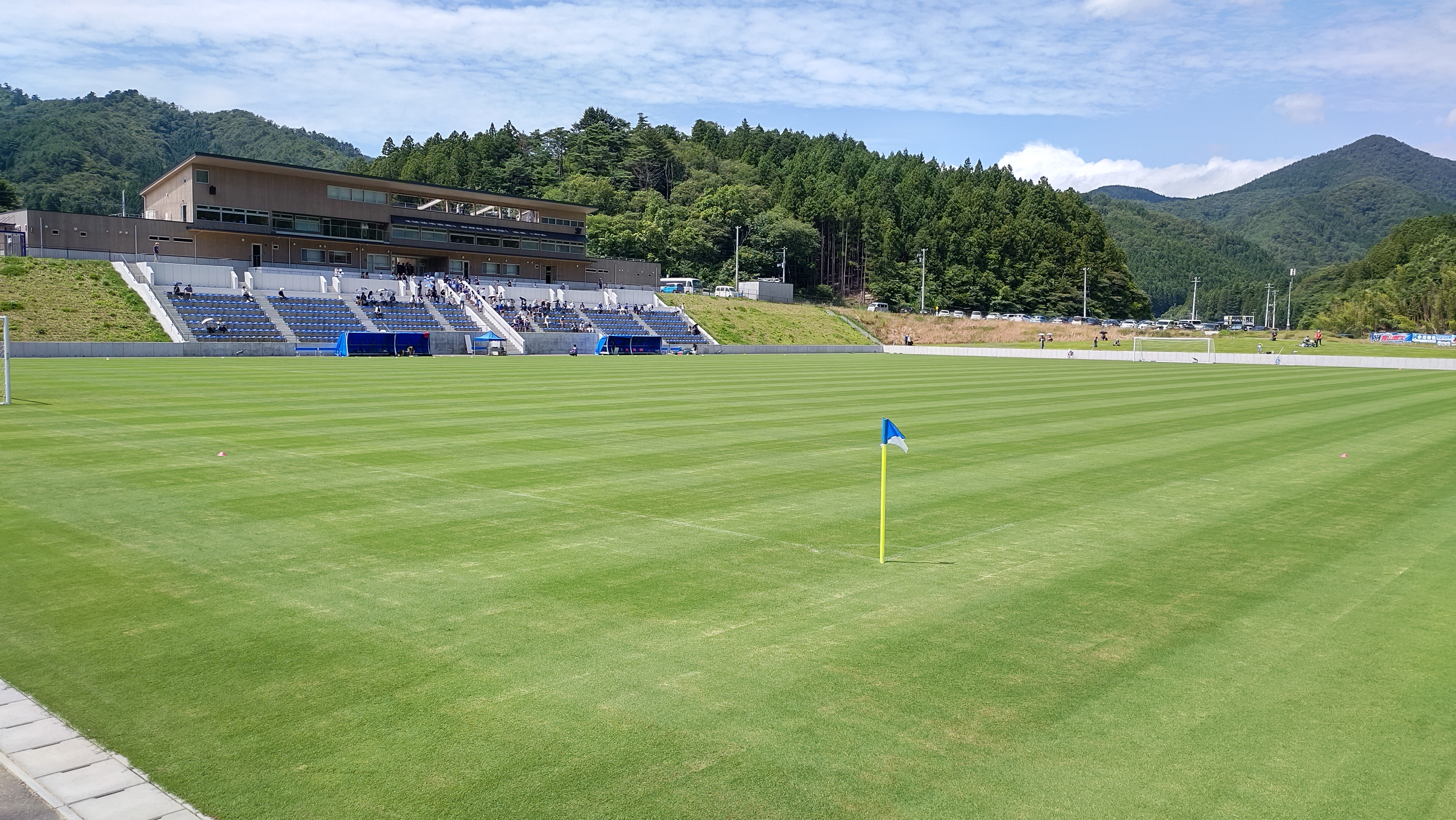
WACK Onagawa Stadium

== Current squad ==
Updated as of 23 August 2023.

Note: Flags indicate national team as defined under FIFA eligibility rules; some limited exceptions apply. Players may hold more than one non-FIFA nationality.

No.	Pos.	Nation	Player
1	GK	JPN	Toshimasa Munakata
3	DF	JPN	Shinji Hiraki
4	DF	JPN	Ryuya Sakai
5	DF	JPN	Tatsuki Masuzawa
6	DF	JPN	Haruki Yamauchi
7	MF	JPN	Kazuya Ogawa
8	MF	JPN	Kaito Yoshimori
9	FW	JPN	Kanta Nishiyama
10	MF	JPN	Koki Ikeda
11	FW	JPN	Ryuya Noguchi
13	DF	JPN	Daigo Masuzaki
14	FW	JPN	Kei Yoshida
15	DF	JPN	Sota Sugiyama
16	MF	JPN	Yuto Yoshida
17	MF	JPN	Iori Tahara

No.	Pos.	Nation	Player
18	MF	JPN	Shogo Funaki
19	DF	JPN	Takumi Shouji
20	DF	JPN	Hiromu Kasahara
21	GK	JPN	Takeru Hasegawa
22	MF	JPN	Koji Takahashi
23	MF	JPN	Yuta Imabe
24	DF	JPN	Kosei Hashimoto
25	MF	JPN	Yasuhiro Okuyama
26	MF	JPN	Ryota Kuroda
27	FW	JPN	Ryoma Sato
28	MF	JPN	Keisuke Yoshikawa
29	FW	JPN	Hiroki Shimura
44	MF	JPN	Yuki Miura
61	GK	JPN	Yuki Furukawa

== League record ==
Champions	Runners-up	Third place	Promoted	Relegated

League											Emperor's Cup	Shakaijin Cup
Season	Division	Position	P	W	D	L	F	A	GD	Pts	Emperor's Cup	Shakaijin Cup
2006	Ishinomaki Citizen League	1st	18	18	0	0	-	-	-	54	Did not qualify	Did not qualify
2007	Miyagi Prefectural League	1st	14	10	2	2	-	-	-	32	Did not qualify	Did not qualify
2008	Tohoku Soccer League (Div. 2, South)	2nd	14	11	0	3	53	9	44	33	Did not qualify	Did not qualify
2009	Tohoku Soccer League (Div. 2, South)	1st	14	12	1	1	30	7	23	37	Did not qualify	Did not qualify
2010	Tohoku Soccer League (Div. 1)	8th	14	1	5	8	13	29	-16	8	Did not qualify	Did not qualify
2011	Withdrew due to 2011 Tohoku earthquake and tsunami											
2012	Tohoku Soccer League (Div. 2, South)	2nd	14	11	2	1	48	11	37	35	Did not qualify	Did not qualify
2013	Tohoku Soccer League (Div. 1)	4th	18	10	2	6	42	29	13	32	Did not qualify	Did not qualify
2014	Tohoku Soccer League (Div. 1)	2nd	18	15	2	1	59	9	51	47	Did not qualify	Did not qualify
2015	Tohoku Soccer League (Div. 1)	3rd	18	14	2	2	62	12	50	44	Did not qualify	Did not qualify
2016	Tohoku Soccer League (Div. 1)	1st	18	13	4	1	66	9	57	43	Did not qualify	Did not qualify
2017	Tohoku Soccer League (Div. 1)	1st	18	16	1	1	73	10	63	49	Did not qualify	Did not qualify
2018	Japan Football League	16th	30	4	5	21	18	65	-47	17	Did not qualify	Did not qualify
2019	Tohoku Soccer League (Div. 1)	3rd	18	12	4	2	52	15	37	40	Did not qualify	Did not qualify
2020 †	Tohoku Soccer League (Div. 1)	3rd	9	6	3	0	31	7	24	21	Did not qualify	‡
2021 †	Tohoku Soccer League (Div. 1)	1st	8	7	1	0	29	7	22	22	Did not qualify	‡
2022	Tohoku Soccer League (Div. 1)	1st	16	15	0	1	71	8	63	45	Did not qualify	Did not qualify
2023	Tohoku Soccer League (Div. 1)	2nd	18	16	1	1	68	11	57	49	Did not qualify	Did not qualify
2024	Tohoku Soccer League (Div. 1)	3rd	18	13	2	3	50	10	40	41	Did not qualify	Round of 16
2025	Tohoku Soccer League (Div. 1)	1st	18	18	0	0	62	5	57	54	Did not qualify	Did not qualify
2026	Tohoku Soccer League (Div. 1)	TBD	18								Did not qualify	TBD

Key

- P = Games played; W = Games won; D = Games drawn; L = Games lost; F = Goals scored; A = Goals conceded; GD = Goals difference; Pts = Points gained
- † Number of games played reduced by COVID-19 worldwide pandemic
- ‡ Competition cancelled due to COVID-19 pandemic in Japan

== Honours ==
Cobaltore Onagawa honours
Honour	No.	Years
Ishinomaki Citizen League	1	2006
Miyagi Prefectural League	1	2007
Tohoku Soccer League (Div. 2, South)	1	2009
Regional Champions League	1	2017
Tohoku Soccer League	5	2016, 2017, 2021, 2022, 2025
