= Ren Yamamoto (footballer, born 1997) =

Japanese footballer

Ren Yamamoto 山本蓮
Personal information
- Full name: Ren Yamamoto
- Date of birth: 13 May 1997 (age 29)
- Place of birth: Kyoto, Japan
- Height: 1.72 m (5 ft 8 in)
- Position: Midfielder

Team information
- Current team: Ococias Kyoto
- Number: 16

Youth career
- 2013–2015: Kyoto Prefectural; Kumiyama High School

Senior career*
Years	Team	Apps	(Gls)
2016–2020	Gainare Tottori	44	(1)
2021–2022	Kagura Shimane	29	(1)
2023–	Ococias Kyoto	22	(1)
- * Club domestic league appearances and goals as of 13 October 2024

Ren Yamamoto (山本 蓮, Yamamoto Ren; born 13 May 1997) is a Japanese footballer who plays for sixth-tier Kansai Soccer League club Ococias Kyoto.

== Club statistics ==
Updated to 23 February 2020.

Club performance			League		Cup		Total	
Season	Club	League	Apps	Goals	Apps	Goals	Apps	Goals
Japan			League		Emperor's Cup		Total	
2016	Gainare Tottori	J3 League	16	1	0	0	16	1
2017	Gainare Tottori	J3 League	6	0	0	0	6	0
2018	Gainare Tottori	J3 League	14	0	2	0	16	0
2019	Gainare Tottori	J3 League	4	0	0	0	4	0
Career total			40	1	2	0	42	1
