= Artista Asama =

Japanese football club

Artista Asama アルティスタ浅間
- Full name: Artista Asama
- Nickname: Artista
- Founded: 1982; 44 years ago
- Stadium: Saku General Sports; Park Athletic Field; Saku, Nagano
- Capacity: 9,500
- Chairman: Kimi Kobayashi
- Manager: Osamu Umeyama
- League: Hokushinetsu Football League
- 2023: 5th
- Website: https://www.artista-asama.com/
Home colours	Away colours

Artista Asama (アルティスタ浅間, Arutisuta Asama) is an association football club based in Tōmi, located in Nagano Prefecture in Japan. They play in the Hokushinetsu Football League, which is part of Japanese Regional Leagues.

== History ==
The club was founded in 1982 and currently has been managed by a non-profit organization, Artista Dream Project, which took the helm of the club in March 2010. In addition to the top team, Artista features a satellite team (Artista Grande), a junior youth team (Artista JYFC) and a junior team (Artista JFC). From the 2018 season, the club has adopted the new name as "Artista Asama" after the local peak which overlooks the cities of Ueda, Tomi and Saku. In the 2020 season, they appeared in the 2020 Emperor's Cup, being it their first appearance in the competition. They lost their first and only match of the tournament by 3–0 to Niigata University of Health and Welfare.

== League & cup record ==
Champions	Runners-up	Third place	Promoted	Relegated

League											Emperor's Cup
Season	Division	Pos	P	W	D	L	F	A	GD	Pts	Emperor's Cup
Artista Tomi
2009	Nagano Prefectural; League (Div. 1)	1st	9	7	2	0	44	10	34	23	Did not qualify
2010	Hokushin'etsu Football; League (Div. 2)	1st	14	10	3	1	44	15	29	33	Did not qualify
2011	Hokushin'etsu Football; League (Div. 1)	2nd	14	10	2	2	30	9	21	32	Did not qualify
2012	Hokushin'etsu Football; League (Div. 1)	4th	14	6	1	7	25	17	8	19	Did not qualify
2013	Hokushin'etsu Football; League (Div. 1)	3rd	14	10	1	3	43	9	34	31	Did not qualify
2014	Hokushin'etsu Football; League (Div. 1)	3rd	14	9	1	4	39	20	19	28	Did not qualify
2015	Hokushin'etsu Football; League (Div. 1)	3rd	14	10	2	2	41	10	31	32	Did not qualify
2016	Hokushin'etsu Football; League (Div. 1)	1st	14	12	1	1	53	4	49	37	Did not qualify
2017	Hokushin'etsu Football; League (Div. 1)	2nd	14	11	1	2	54	8	46	34	Did not qualify
Artista Asama
2018	Hokushin'etsu Football; League (Div. 1)	2nd	14	11	2	1	50	11	39	34	Did not qualify
2019	Hokushin'etsu Football; League (Div. 1)	2nd	14	12	1	1	48	7	41	37	Did not qualify
2020 †	Hokushin'etsu Football; League (Div. 1)	2nd	7	5	1	1	11	3	8	16	2nd round
2021	Hokushin'etsu Football; League (Div. 1)	2nd	16	11	2	3	41	14	27	35	Did not qualify
2022	Hokushin'etsu Football; League (Div. 1)	1st	14	9	4	1	36	12	24	31	Did not qualify
2023	Hokushin'etsu Football; League (Div. 1)	5th	14	6	3	5	23	22	1	21	Did not qualify
2024	Hokushin'etsu Football; League (Div. 1)	4th	14	8	2	4	33	15	18	26	Did not qualify
2025	Hokushin'etsu Football; League (Div. 1)	5th	14	5	4	5	25	17	8	19	Did not qualify
2026	Hokushin'etsu Football; League (Div. 1)	TBD	14								TBD

Key

- Pos. = Position in league; P = Games played; W = Games won; D = Games drawn; L = Games lost; F = Goals scored; A = Goals conceded; GD = Goals difference; Pts = Points gained
- † Number of games played reduced by COVID-19 worldwide pandemic

== Honours ==
Artista Asama honours
Honour	No.	Years
Nagano Prefectural Football League 2nd Division	1	2008
Nagano Prefectural Football League 1st Division	1	2009
Hokushinetsu Football League 2nd Division	1	2010
Hokushinetsu Football League 1st Division	1	2016, 2022
Nagano Prefecture Soccer Championship	1	2020

== Current squad ==
Updated to 23 August 2023.

Note: Flags indicate national team as defined under FIFA eligibility rules; some limited exceptions apply. Players may hold more than one non-FIFA nationality.

No.	Pos.	Nation	Player
2	DF	JPN	Riku Soma
3	DF	JPN	Eito Matsudo
5	MF	JPN	Minoru Moriya
6	MF	JPN	Ren Miyashita
7	MF	JPN	Masaya Tojo
8	MF	JPN	Hiroya Yamashita
10	MF	JPN	Seiya Kiyatake
11	FW	JPN	Itsuki Takagai
13	DF	JPN	Daiki Kimura
15	MF	JPN	Kanta Obuchi
16	DF	JPN	Kai Ichikura
17	FW	JPN	Kentaro Uehara

No.	Pos.	Nation	Player
18	MF	JPN	Yuta Nishida
21	GK	JPN	Kenta Fujimori
22	DF	JPN	Toui Yamakose
23	MF	JPN	Hayato Usuba
24	DF	JPN	Subaru Toriumi
25	MF	JPN	Mutsuki Shimizu
26	FW	JPN	Kazuki Kobayashi
27	FW	JPN	Daiki Okada
31	GK	JPN	Ryusei Onozeki
32	DF	JPN	Yusuke Hino
34	MF	JPN	Yuki Okamoto
