= FC Baleine Shimonoseki =

Japanese football club

FC Baleine Shimonoseki FCバレイン下関
- Full name: FC Baleine Shimonoseki
- Founded: 2006; 20 years ago
- Ground: Nogihama Park; Saving Athletic Stadium
- Capacity: 5,000 (NP); 23,939 (SAS)
- Chairman: Koki Harada
- Manager: Kazuma Yamane
- League: Chūgoku Soccer League
- 2024: 4th of 10
- Website: fcbaleine.jp

FC Baleine Shimonoseki (FCバレイン下関, Efu Shi Barein Shimonoseki) are a Japanese football club based on Shimonoseki, Yamaguchi Prefecture. They play in the Chūgoku Soccer League, one of Japan's fifth tier leagues, which is part of Japanese Regional Leagues.

== Name origin ==
The name Baleine means whale in French. Whales are related with the club's hometown Shimonoseki, that was once a whaling base.

== History ==
The club was founded on 2006, starting from the 4th division of the Yamaguchi Prefecture League, one of the 10th-tier leagues of Japanese football. Baleine would only get out of prefectural football on 2018, after winning promotion to the Chugoku Soccer League, starting their journey on regional football. In their first season, on 2019, it finished on 4th place within 10 participating teams.

Between 2020 and 2022, the club reached its peak so far, having finished two seasons as league runners-up, and qualified for the Emperor's Cup twice in the period. In the 2020 Emperor's Cup, the club made its debut at the second round, in a competition professional teams-shrunk due to the pandemic. They ended up losing against fellow Chugoku region side Fukuyama City FC. In the following year, the club once again failed to win an Emperor's Cup match, losing against Mitsubishi Mizushima FC, also from the Chugoku region, on the first round of the competition.

In 2023, Baleine qualified for the Emperor's Cup, winning their qualification as Yamaguchi representatives on 23 April, after beating Shunan University in the prefectural preliminaries' Final. They were knocked out in the first round by Verspah Oita. In 2024, they repeated the feat of qualifying to the Emperor's Cup as Yamaguchi representatives over Shunan. In the first round they defeated J3 League team Gainare Tottori in a tense penalty shoot-out by 4-3, with scores level at 1-1 after playing 120 minutes. In the second round of the competition, they lost heavily to Sanfrecce Hiroshima by 11–2. This is the first time Baleine have played official matches against professional sides.

== League and cup record ==
Champions	Runners-up	Third place	Promoted	Relegated

League											Emperor's Cup
Season	Division	Pos.	P	W	D	L	F	A	GD	Pts	Emperor's Cup
2006	Yamaguchi 4th Division B Block	2nd	8	6	0	2	39	7	32	18	Did not qualify
2007	Yamaguchi 4th Division B Block	1st	8	8	0	0	49	2	47	24	Did not qualify
2008	Yamaguchi 3rd Division B Block	1st	7	7	0	0	24	1	23	21	Did not qualify
2009	Yamaguchi 2nd Division	1st	7	5	1	1	40	5	35	16	Did not qualify
2010	Yamaguchi 1st Division	3rd	10	5	1	4	32	18	14	16	Did not qualify
2011	Yamaguchi 1st Division	1st	12	10	1	1	40	14	26	31	Did not qualify
2012	Yamaguchi 1st Division	5th	10	4	2	4	29	14	15	14	Did not qualify
2013	Yamaguchi 1st Division	5th	12	2	3	7	23	35	-12	11	Did not qualify
2014	Yamaguchi 1st Division	2nd	10	5	1	4	33	21	12	16	Did not qualify
2015	Yamaguchi 1st Division	2nd	14	10	2	2	45	12	33	32	Did not qualify
2016	Yamaguchi 1st Division	1st	10	8	2	0	33	5	28	26	Did not qualify
2017	Yamaguchi 1st Division	1st	12	9	2	1	41	8	33	29	Did not qualify
2018	Yamaguchi 1st Division	1st	12	11	1	0	64	9	55	34	Did not qualify
2019	Chugoku Soccer League	4th	18	10	2	6	45	23	22	32	
2020	Chugoku Soccer League	League season cancelled because of COVID-19									2nd round
2021	Chugoku Soccer League	2nd	16	11	2	3	35	16	19	35	1st round
2022	Chugoku Soccer League	2nd	18	14	0	4	41	22	19	42	Did not qualify
2023	Chugoku Soccer League	3rd	18	12	1	5	47	26	21	37	1st round
2024	Chugoku Soccer League	4th	18	10	2	6	45	24	21	32	2nd round
2025	Chugoku Soccer League	TBA	18	0	0	0	0	0	0	0	2nd round

Key

- Pos. = Position in league; P = Games played; W = Games won; D = Games drawn; L = Games lost; F = Goals scored; A = Goals conceded; GD = Goal difference; Pts = Points won

== Honours ==
FC Baleine Shimonoseki honours
Honour	No.	Years
Yamaguchi 4th Division B Block	1	2007
Yamaguchi 3rd Division B Block	1	2008
Yamaguchi 2nd Division	1	2009
Yamaguchi Prefectural League 1st Division	4	2011, 2016, 2017, 2018
Nogami Cup	1	2011
Yamaguchi Football Championship (Emperor's Cup Prefectural Qualifying Tournament)	5	2020, 2021, 2023, 2024, 2025

== Players and staff ==
=== Current squad ===
As of 30 April 2024.

Note: Flags indicate national team as defined under FIFA eligibility rules; some limited exceptions apply. Players may hold more than one non-FIFA nationality.

No.	Pos.	Nation	Player
1	GK	JPN	Ryuga Okazaki
3	DF	JPN	Naofumi Shimomura
4	DF	JPN	Haruto Kawamae
5	DF	JPN	Kentaro Handa
6	MF	JPN	Masahide Noda
7	MF	JPN	Yushiro Masuda
8	FW	JPN	Hayate Harasaki
9	FW	JPN	Kazuhito Kishida
10	FW	JPN	Kenshiro Nishida
11	MF	JPN	Gakuto Nomiyama
13	FW	JPN	Kota Yonezawa
14	MF	JPN	Kaito Toda

No.	Pos.	Nation	Player
16	GK	JPN	Shunya Kachi
17	MF	JPN	Yu Nomoto
18	DF	JPN	Yuya Saito
20	MF	JPN	Ryota Hieda
21	FW	JPN	Kakeru Banno
23	FW	JPN	Sota Sato
24	MF	JPN	Maoto Sakata
27	DF	JPN	Yuki Iwamoto
28	DF	JPN	Yasutomo Saito
31	DF	JPN	Yuto Muneno
39	DF	JPN	Daisuke Nishi
91	MF	JPN	Kakeru Nagano

=== Current staff ===
Position	Name
Manager	(Japan) Kazuma Yamane
Assistant manager	(Japan) Kaito Kurogi
Staff manager	(Japan) Shuto Kondo (Japan) Akiko Matsumoto
Representant	(Japan) Kota Fukuhara
Chairman	(Japan) Koki Harada
