= Ococias Kyoto AC =

Japanese football club

Ococias Kyoto AC おこしやす京都AC
- Full name: Ococias Kyoto AC
- Founded: 1993; 33 years ago
- Ground: Takebishi Stadium Kyoto; Kyoto, Kyoto
- Manager: Hirofumi Yoshitake
- League: Kansai Soccer League 2nd Div.
- 2024: Kansai Soccer League 2nd Div., 6th of 8
- Website: ococias.kyoto
Home colours	Away colours	Third colours

Ococias Kyoto AC (Japanese: おこしやす京都AC, Okoshiyasu Kyōto Eshi) is a Japanese professional football club based in Kyoto, Kyoto Prefecture, that competes in the 2nd division of the Kansai Soccer League, which is part of Japanese Regional Leagues.

== History ==
The club was founded in 1993.

The club split off from the original Kyoto Shiko Club when it professionalised and became today's Kyoto Sanga FC.

The club now appears in Kansai Soccer League, part of Japanese Regional Leagues. The club's name was Amitie SC Kyoto until 2017 season. From 2018 season, the club name changed to Ococias Kyoto AC.

== Club name ==
former club crest

new crest

- 1994–1999: Kyoiku Kenkyusya SC
- 2000: FC Kyoken
- 2001: FC Kyoken Kyoto
- 2002–2009: FC Kyoto Bamb 1993
- 2010: Amitie SC Kyoto
- 2011–2014: Amitie SC
- 2015–2017: Amitie SC Kyoto
- 2018–: Ococias Kyoto AC

== Squad ==
As of 5 May 2024.

Note: Flags indicate national team as defined under FIFA eligibility rules; some limited exceptions apply. Players may hold more than one non-FIFA nationality.

No.	Pos.	Nation	Player
3	DF	MNE	Filip Šćekić
5	MF	JPN	Yudai Iwama
7	MF	JPN	Jumpei Takata
8	FW	JPN	Koki Kiyotake
9	FW	MNE	Stefan Čađenović
11	FW	JPN	Taiyo Minami
13	MF	JPN	Takara Masutani
14	DF	JPN	Kanta Iwami

No.	Pos.	Nation	Player
16	MF	JPN	Ren Yamamoto
17	MF	JPN	Yosuke Sasaki
18	FW	JPN	Hirohito Kawamura
19	MF	JPN	Tatsuki Noda
21	DF	JPN	Naoya Seita
23	MF	JPN	Yuki Kozuka
24	GK	JPN	Yusuke Moriyama
32	GK	JPN	Kagenori Takumi
