= 2020 Japanese Regional Football Champions League =

Japanese amateur leagues football season

2020 Japanese Regional Champions League
Tournament details
- Country: Japan
- Dates: 6–23 November 2020
- Teams: 12

Final positions
- Champions: FC TIAMO Hirakata (1st title)
- Runners-up: FC Kariya

Tournament statistics
- Matches played: 24
- Goals scored: 50 (2.08 per match)
- Attendance: 7,502 (313 per match)
- Top goal scorer(s): Cho Young-chul (Hirakata), Naoyasu Takahara (Okinawa) (3 goals)
- All statistics correct as of 14 June 2025.

The 2020 Japanese Regional Football Champions League (全国地域サッカーチャンピオンズリーグ2020) was the 44th edition of the referred annually contested cup for the best-placed teams of each of their respective Regional Leagues. The competition was held from 6th to the 23rd of November 2020 in Tochigi, Hyogo, Saga, with the final round held in Chiba

== Overview ==
On September 2, 2020, the Japan Football Association (JFA) announced the tournament guidelines. Prior to this, on July 21, 2020, the "56th All Japan Adult Football Championship", which is a tournament that usually competes for qualification for this tournament, was cancelled due to the spread of the new coronavirus. A change in the allocation of quotas was announced.

== Venue ==
First round

Group	Venue	Location	Image
A	Shimono City Omatsuyama Sports Park Athletics Stadium	Shimono City, Tochigi	
B	SAGA Sunrise Park Athletics Stadium	Saga City, Saga	
C	Goshikudai Sports Park Main Ground	Sumoto City, Hyogo	

Final round

Venue	Location	Image
ZA Oripri Stadium	Ichihara City, Chiba	

== Participating teams ==
Locations of clubs participating in the 2020 National Regional Football Champions League
1. The champion team from each regional league 2020 (a total of nine teams).
  In a typical year, the winner of the highest category in each league (or the second-place team if the winning teams) is. However, this year, due to the coronavirus, the selection method was altered in some regions.
  - Hokkaido: Hokkaido Tokachi Sky Earth
  - Tohoku Division 1: Blancdieu Hirosaki
  - Kanto Division 1: Tochigi City
  - Hokushinetsu 1st Division: Fukui United
  - Tokai Division 1: FC Kariya (Due to the cancellation of league matches, the winner of the first division tournament of the alternative tournament "2020 Tokai Adult Soccer League Tournament" was selected)
  - Kansai 1st Division: Tiamo Hirakata
  - Chugoku: SRC Hiroshima (Selected as the winner of the alternative tournament "CSL Championship 2020" due to the cancellation of the league match)
  - Shikoku:FC Tokushima
  - Kyushu: Okinawa SV (Due to the cancellation of the league in the middle of the league, the board of directors selected the 2019 season champion Okinawa SV
2. Supplement the J.League Centennial Vision Club that secured second place in each regional league. If there are multiple clubs, priority will be based on the of approval for the J.League Centennial Vision Club. Furthermore, each club may qualify only once under criterion.
  - Not applicable (Of the Centennial Vision clubs belonging to the regional league, Tochigi City has already qualified by winning the Kanto 1st Division, and Vonds Ichihara is 4th in the Kanto 1st Division and does not meet the requirements)
3. If the number of teams falls below 12 under conditions 1 and 2, the second-place teams from the regional league that wish to join the JFL will be replenished in rotating order based on the number of teams with the All Japan Football Federation as of the end of June 2010. (Kanto→ Kansai→ Kyushu→ Tokai→ Hokkaido→ Chugoku→ Hokushin'etsu→ Tohoku →Shikoku)" (so-called "rotation quotas"). In fiscal 2020, the Kanto region →in the order of Kansai → Kyushu).
  - Kanto Division 1 2nd Place: Briobecca Urayasu
  - Kansai Division 1 2nd Place: Laranja Kyoto
  - Kyushu 2nd place: J.FC Miyazaki (Designated as the runner for the 2019 as a result of the league season's cancellation.)
4. If there are no participating teams from the region under the specified conditions the All-Japan Adult Football Federation will determine and allocate the results. (Since 12 teams were decided under these conditions, they will not be implemented.)

== Match format ==
Based on the tournament guidelines announced by the JFA.

- In the first round, the twelve participating teams will be divided into three groups, each consisting of four teams, to compete in a round-robin league format. Four teams will advance to the final round: the three group winners and the best performing team among the second-place finishers. In the final round, these four teams will again compete in a round-robin league format.
- The grouping remained consistent with the previous year and took place on October 24, 2020, at the Japan Football Association Headquarters. It was conducted in the same manner and broadcast on the official Kansai Soccer League YouTube channel.
1. Three of the regional league champions are from the region that includes the venue of the first round (Shimono: Tochigi C, Goshikudai: Hirakata, SAGA: Okinawa. For convenience, we will refer to them as "Group 1"), the other six regional league champions (the same as the "Second Group"), and the three teams that will compete in the rotating slot (Urayasu, L Kyoto, JFC Miyazaki. The third group will be distributed. As a result, it is predetermined that the teams in the first and third groups will not be in the same group.
2. Prepare "Pot 1" and "Pot 3" with one ball with the group name (A, B, C) and "Pot 2" with two balls each, three types of "Pot A, B, C" with balls with the position number (A-1 - C-4) for each group, and a "lottery box" with numbers 1 to 4.
3. First, three "lottery boxes" will be drawn to determine the position of each group in the final round. The remaining positions will be reserved for the wild card (the highest ranking of the second place in the first round).
4. Next, the three teams in the first group will draw "Pot 1" and the corresponding "Pot A, B, and C" were drawn to link the group to the venue of the first-round games and determine the position of each team.
5. Next, the six teams in the second group were drawn from "Pot 2" and the corresponding "Pot A, B, and C" to determine the position of each team.
6. Finally, the three teams in the third group will draw from "Pot 3" to determine their respective positions. In this scenario, the possibility of teams from the same regional league being placed in the same group is disregarded.
- The games consisted of two 45-minute halves, with no provision for extra time or penalty shootouts.
- In both first and final rounds, points will be awarded for each win over the course of 90 minutes = 3, a draw = 1, a loss = 0), rankings will be determined the cumulative points earned across the three matches. In the event of a draw, the difference, total number of goals scored, then head-to-head record between the concerned teams (not applied when determining the top two finishers in each group), foul points, will also be considered. If there is still no, a lottery draw will be conducted.

== Match schedule ==
In the first round, all matches are All Japan Adult Football Federation (Group A, Shimono), Kansai Soccer League (Group B, Saga), Hyogo Prefecture Adult Football Federation (C Group, Goshikidai) It was live-streamed on the YouTube channel.

=== Group A ===
Pos	Team	Pld	W	D	L	GF	GA	GD	Pts	Qualification
1	Tochigi City FC (Q)	3	3	0	0	6	1	+5	9	Advanced to the Final round
2	Hokkaido Tokachi Sky Earth (Q)	3	2	0	1	4	3	+1	6	Advanced to the Final round
3	Blancdieu Hirosaki	3	1	0	2	2	5	−3	3	
4	Laranja Kyoto	3	0	0	3	1	4	−3	0	

Source: JFA
(Q) Qualified for the phase indicated

6 November 2020
10:45

Blancdieu Hirosaki	0 - 2	Tochigi City
	Match report	Tetsuki 59' (pen.); Shishi 79'

Shimono City Omatsuyama Sports Park Athletics Stadium
Attendance: 621
Referee: Kiminori Yasukawa

6 November 2020
13:30

Laranja Kyoto	0 - 1	Hokkaido Tokachi Sky Earth
	Match report	Matsuo 76'

Shimono City Omatsuyama Sports Park Athletics Stadium
Attendance: 226
Referee: Takashi Hara

7 November 2020
10:45

Blancdieu Hirosaki	1 - 0	Laranja Kyoto
Takahashi 21'	Match report

Shimono City Omatsuyama Sports Park Athletics Stadium
Attendance: 401
Referee: Hikaru Munakata

7 November 2020
13:30

Tochigi City	2 - 0	Hokkaido Tokachi Sky Earth
Oshima 18'; Okaba 54'	Match report

Shimono City Omatsuyama Sports Park Athletics Stadium
Attendance: 853
Referee: Yu Takahashi

8 November 2020
10:45

Blancdieu Hirosaki	1 - 3	Hokkaido Tokachi Sky Earth
Kawamoto 32'	Match report	Yasuya 9', 87'; Masaya 72'

Shimono City Omatsuyama Sports Park Athletics Stadium
Attendance: 341
Referee: Takashi Hara

8 November 2020
13:30

Tochigi City	2 - 1	Laranja Kyoto
Atsushi 80' (pen.); Teruki 83'	Match report	Iribe 58' (pen.)

Shimono City Omatsuyama Sports Park Athletics Stadium
Attendance: 597
Referee: Hikaru Munakata

=== Group B ===
Pos	Team	Pld	W	D	L	GF	GA	GD	Pts	Qualification
1	FC Kariya (Q)	3	2	1	0	4	1	+3	7	Advanced to the Final round
2	Briobecca Urayasu	3	1	2	0	6	3	+3	5	
3	Okinawa SV	3	1	1	1	5	4	+1	4	
4	SRC Hiroshima	3	0	0	3	1	8	−7	0	

Source: JFA
(Q) Qualified for the phase indicated

6 November 2020
10:45

Briobecca Urayasu	1 - 1	FC Kariya
Yoshida 67'	Match report	Koinuma 43'

SAGA Sunrise Park Athletics Stadium
Attendance: 83
Referee: Hiroki Tan

6 November 2020
13:30

Okinawa SV	3 - 1	SRC Hiroshima
Takahara 20'; Yamauchi 30', 36'	Match report	Niino 47'

SAGA Sunrise Park Athletics Stadium
Attendance: 85
Referee: Akira Ide

7 November 2020
10:45

Briobecca Urayasu	2 - 2	Okinawa SV
Kojima 55'; Yamazaki 90+2'	Match report	Takahara 45+1' (pen.), 69'

SAGA Sunrise Park Athletics Stadium
Attendance: 156
Referee: Kazuki Nakamura

7 November 2020
13:30

FC Kariya	2 - 0	SRC Hiroshima
Harima 34'; Fukuya 52'	Match report

SAGA Sunrise Park Athletics Stadium
Attendance: 86
Referee: Ryuhei Yamaguchi

8 November 2020
10:45

Briobecca Urayasu	3 - 0	SRC Hiroshima
Akiba 6'; Yoshida 33'; Yamazaki 37'	Match report

SAGA Sunrise Park Athletics Stadium
Attendance: 105
Referee: Hikari Ide

8 November 2020
13:30

FC Kariya	1 - 0	Okinawa SV
Sasaki 5'	Match report

SAGA Sunrise Park Athletics Stadium
Attendance: 235
Referee: Ryuhei Yamaguchi

=== Group C ===
Pos	Team	Pld	W	D	L	GF	GA	GD	Pts	Qualification
1	Tiamo Hirakata (Q)	3	2	1	0	3	0	+3	7	Advance to the Final round
2	Fukui United	3	1	2	0	2	0	+2	5	
3	FC Tokushima	3	1	0	2	3	5	−2	3	
4	J.FC Miyazaki	3	0	1	2	2	5	−3	1	

Source: JFA
(Q) Qualified for the phase indicated

6 November 2020
10:45

J.FC Miyazaki	2 - 3	FC Tokushima
Shoma 29' (pen.); Keita 45+2'	Match report	Goto 26'; Nakabayashi 74', 77' (pen.)

Goshikudai Sports Park Main Ground
Attendance: 75
Referee: Takasaki Koji

6 November 2020
13:30

Fukui United	0 - 0	Tiamo Hirakata
	Match report

Goshikudai Sports Park Main Ground
Attendance: 105
Referee: Hiroki Tanabe

7 November 2020
10:45

J.FC Miyazaki	0 - 0	Fukui United
	Match report

Goshikudai Sports Park Main Ground
Attendance: 138
Referee: Akira Kawakatsu

7 November 2020
13:30

FC Tokushima	0 - 1	Tiamo Hirakata
	Match report	Cho Young-chul 73'

Goshikudai Sports Park Main Ground
Attendance: 183
Referee: Takamasa Funahashi

8 November 2020
10:45

J.FC Miyazaki	0 - 2	Tiamo Hirakata
	Match report	Okamoto 4'; Kotani 42'

Goshikudai Sports Park Main Ground
Attendance: 211
Referee: Takasaki Koji

8 November 2020
13:30

FC Tokushima	0 - 2	Fukui United
	Match report	Kanemura 66'; Ganaha 90+3'

Goshikudai Sports Park Main Ground
Attendance: 122
Referee: Takamasa Funahashi

=== Ranking of second-placed teams ===
The three winners of each group of the first round qualified for the final round, alongside the best-placed team among the runners-up of each group.

Pos	Team	Pld	W	D	L	GF	GA	GD	Pts	Qualification
1	Hokkaido Tokachi Sky Earth (Q)	3	2	0	1	4	3	+1	6	Qualification for the final round
2	Briobecca Urayasu	3	1	2	0	6	3	+3	5	
3	Fukui United	3	1	2	0	2	0	+2	5	

Source: JFA
(Q) Qualified for the phase indicated

=== Final round ===
Pos	Team	Pld	W	D	L	GF	GA	GD	Pts	Qualification
1	Tiamo Hirakata (P)	3	1	2	0	6	1	+5	5	Promoted to JFL
2	FC Kariya (P)	3	1	2	0	4	1	+3	5	Promoted to JFL
3	Tochigi City FC	3	1	2	0	1	0	+1	5	
4	Hokkaido Tokachi Sky Earth	3	0	0	3	0	9	−9	0	

Source: JFA
(P) Promoted

19 November 2020
10:45

Tiamo Hirakata	5 - 0	Hokkaido Tokachi Sky Earth
Cho Young-chul 45+2', 63'; Sato 51'; Fukumori 87', 90'	Match report

ZA Olipri Stadium
Attendance: 230
Referee: Masakazu Kato

19 November 2020
13:30

FC Kariya	0 - 0	Tochigi City FC
	Match report

ZA Olipri Stadium
Attendance: 250
Referee: Toshiki Tomomasa

21 November 2020
10:45

Tiamo Hirakata	1 - 1	FC Kariya
Michigami 90+4'	Match report	Koinuma 90'

ZA Olipri Stadium
Attendance: 422
Referee: Masashi Harada

21 November 2020
13:30

Hokkaido Tokachi Sky Earth	0 - 1	Tochigi City FC
	Match report	Oshima 68'

ZA Olipri Stadium
Attendance: 469
Referee: Tomoki Umeda

23 November 2020
10:45

Tiamo Hirakata	0 - 0	Tochigi City FC
	Match report

ZA Olipri Stadium
Attendance: 863
Referee: Satoru Michiyama

23 November 2020
13:30

Hokkaido Tokachi Sky Earth	0 - 3	FC Kariya
	Match report	Yuki 15', 34' (pen.); Hiroki 62'

ZA Olipri Stadium
Attendance: 645
Referee: Tomoya Suzuki

== Final result ==
- 1. Tiamo Hirakata
- 2. FC Kariya
- 3. Tochigi City
- 4. Hokkaido Tokachi Sky Earth

The top two teams were approved to join the JFL at the JFL Board of Directors meeting held on December 8, 2020.
