= 2017 Japanese Regional Leagues =

Japanese amateur leagues football season

Japanese Regional Leagues
- Season: 2017
- Promoted: Cobaltore Onagawa; Tegevajaro Miyazaki

The 2017 Japanese Regional Leagues were a competition between parallel association football leagues ranking at the fifth and sixth tiers of the Japan Football League.

== Champions list ==
Qualified for the Japan Regional Football Champions League 2017

Region	Champions
Hokkaido	Tokachi FC
Tohoku	Cobaltore Onagawa
Kanto	Vonds Ichihara
Hokushinetsu	Saurcos Fukui
Tokai	Suzuka Unlimited FC
Kansai	Amitie SC Kyoto
Chūgoku	Mitsubishi Mizushima FC
Shikoku	Kochi United SC
Kyushu	Tegevajaro Miyazaki

Along them, also Matsue City FC and FC TIAMO Hirakata qualified for the final tournament as they featured in the Top 4 of 2017 All Japan Senior Football Championship. To complete the scenario, also FC Kariya were picked to participate.

== Hokkaido ==
Pos	Team	Pld	W	D	L	GF	GA	GD	Pts	Qualification or relegation
1	Tokachi FC (C, Q)	14	10	2	2	39	22	+17	32	
2	Sapporo Football Club	14	10	1	3	38	17	+21	31	
3	Norbritz Hokkaido	14	9	2	3	32	13	+19	29	
4	Sapporo GOAL PLUNDERERS	14	6	1	7	28	24	+4	19	
5	Nippon Steel Kamaishi	14	5	2	7	29	36	−7	17	
6	Imamizawa FC Hokushukai	14	5	2	7	28	38	−10	17	
7	Nippon Express FC (R)	14	2	3	9	18	38	−20	9	Relegated to Sapporo Prefectural League
8	Kyokusyukai (R)	14	2	1	11	18	42	−24	7	Relegated to Sapporo Prefectural League

(C) Champions; (Q) Qualified for the Japan Regional Football Champions League; (R) Relegated

== Tohoku ==
=== Division 1 ===
Pos	Team	Pld	W	D	L	GF	GA	GD	Pts	Promotion or relegation
1	Cobaltore Onagawa (C, Q, P)	18	16	1	1	73	10	+63	49	Promoted to JFL
2	Fuji Club 2003	18	13	0	5	47	18	+29	39	
3	Blancdieu Hirosaki FC	18	11	3	4	35	20	+15	36	
4	Nippon Steel Kamaishi	18	9	2	7	30	39	−9	29	
5	Morioka Zebra	18	8	4	6	54	35	+19	28	
6	FC Primeiro	18	6	3	9	26	34	−8	21	
7	Bandits Iwaki FC	18	5	4	9	29	39	−10	19	
8	FC Ganju Iwate	18	5	0	13	31	58	−27	15	
9	Merry FC	18	4	2	12	24	59	−35	14	
10	Sendai Sasuke FC (R)	18	2	3	13	20	57	−37	9	Relegated to Div. 2 South

Source: RSSSF
(C) Champions; (P) Promoted; (Q) Qualified for the Japan Regional Football Champions League; (R) Relegated

=== Division 2 North ===
Pos	Team	Pld	W	D	L	GF	GA	GD	Pts	Promotion or relegation
1	Akita FC Cambiare (C, P)	18	13	2	3	58	22	+36	41	Promoted to Div. 1
2	Saruta Kōgyō S.C. [tl]	18	13	0	5	71	35	+36	39	
3	Omiya Club	18	12	2	4	45	21	+24	38	
4	Akita University School of Medicine	18	12	1	5	58	37	+21	37	
5	TDK Shinwakai	18	9	3	6	36	39	−3	30	
6	Mizusawa Club	18	7	3	8	34	35	−1	24	
7	Hachinohe Gakuin University FC 2014	18	6	3	9	38	48	−10	21	Disbanded
8	OIRASE Football Club	18	4	4	10	28	47	−19	16	
9	Hokuto Bank SC	18	3	2	13	23	62	−39	11	
10	TONO Club	18	1	0	17	13	58	−45	3	

Source: RSSSF
(C) Champions; (P) Promoted

=== Division 2 South ===
Pos	Team	Pld	W	D	L	GF	GA	GD	Pts	Promotion or relegation
1	Iwaki Furukawa FC (C, P)	18	13	3	2	63	23	+40	42	Promoted to Div. 1
2	Soma SC	18	10	4	4	27	12	+15	34	
3	FC Parafrente Yonezawa	18	9	2	7	36	34	+2	29	
4	AIZU OLYMPUS Soccer Club	18	7	7	4	30	26	+4	28	
5	Nakaniida Soccer Club	18	8	3	7	37	35	+2	27	
6	Sendai Nakada FC	18	7	3	8	32	43	−11	24	
7	Ricoh Industry Tohoku Soccer Club	18	5	6	7	41	31	+10	21	
8	FC Scheinen Fukushima (R)	18	5	5	8	36	39	−3	20	Relegated to Fukushima Prefectural League
9	Kureha SC (R)	18	3	5	10	25	48	−23	14	Relegated to Fukushima Prefectural League
10	Mikawa SC (R)	18	2	4	12	16	52	−36	10	Relegated to Yamagata Prefectural League

Source: RSSSF
(C) Champions; (P) Promoted; (R) Relegated

== Kantō ==
=== Division 1 ===
Pos	Team	Pld	W	D	L	GF	GA	GD	Pts	Qualification or relegation
1	Vonds Ichihara (C, Q)	18	13	3	2	44	18	+26	42	
2	Tsukuba FC	18	13	2	3	43	17	+26	41	
3	Tokyo United FC	18	8	6	4	40	25	+15	30	
4	Tokyo 23 FC	18	7	6	5	28	21	+7	27	
5	Vertfee Takahara Nasu	18	8	3	7	29	23	+6	27	
6	Ryutsu Keizai University FC	18	8	0	10	36	34	+2	24	
7	Yokohama Takeru (O)	18	7	3	8	25	37	−12	24	D1/D2 play-offs
8	Saitama SC (O)	18	5	2	11	25	41	−16	17	D1/D2 play-offs
9	Hitachi Building SystemTonan Maebashi (R)	18	5	2	11	24	40	−16	17	Relegated to Div. 2
10	Aries FC Tokyo (R)	18	1	3	14	12	50	−38	6	Relegated to Div. 2

(C) Champions; (O) Relegation/Promotion play-off; (Q) Qualified for the Japan Regional Football Champions League; (R) Relegated

=== Division 2 ===
Pos	Team	Pld	W	D	L	GF	GA	GD	Pts	Qualification or relegation
1	Tokyo International University FC (O, C)	18	12	3	3	38	18	+20	39	D1/D2 play-offs
2	Tonan Maebashi (O)	18	9	4	5	26	21	+5	31	D1/D2 play-offs
3	Toin University of Yokohama	18	9	3	6	45	28	+17	30	
4	Waseda United	18	8	4	6	41	33	+8	28	
5	Kanagawa Prefecture Teachers SC	18	8	3	7	37	37	0	27	
6	Esperanza SC	18	6	5	7	33	26	+7	23	
7	YOKOHAMA GS Football Club (O)	18	6	5	7	31	32	−1	23	D2/Prefectural play-offs
8	FC Korea (R)	18	6	5	7	18	21	−3	23	D2/Prefectural play-offs
9	Toho Titanium SC (R)	18	5	2	11	27	44	−17	17	Relegated to Kanagawa Prefectural League
10	Nippon Engineering College F. Marinos (R)	18	3	2	13	13	49	−36	11	Relegated to Kanagawa Prefectural League

(C) Champions; (O) Relegation/Promotion play-off; (R) Relegated

== Hokushinetsu ==
=== Division 1 ===
Pos	Team	Pld	W	D	L	GF	GA	GD	Pts	Qualification or relegation
1	Saurcos Fukui (C, Q)	14	11	2	1	55	5	+50	35	
2	Artista Tomi	14	11	1	2	54	8	+46	34	
3	Japan Soccer College	14	9	2	3	42	11	+31	29	
4	Sakai Phoenix	14	4	4	6	17	32	−15	16	
5	'09 Keidai FC	14	5	1	8	18	40	−22	16	
6	FC Hokuriku	14	4	3	7	21	35	−14	15	
7	Toyama Shinjo Club	14	2	3	9	17	52	−35	9	
8	FC Antelope Shiojiri (R)	14	1	2	11	8	49	−41	5	Relegated to Div. 2

(C) Champions; (Q) Qualified for the Japan Regional Football Champions League; (R) Relegated

=== Division 2 ===
Pos	Team	Pld	W	D	L	GF	GA	GD	Pts	Promotion or relegation
1	FC Ueda Gentian (C, P)	14	11	1	2	52	15	+37	34	Promoted to Div. 1
2	Artista Grande	14	9	3	2	37	27	+10	30	
3	Hokuriku Futures	14	9	0	5	27	20	+7	27	
4	Nakano Esperanza	14	7	1	6	29	29	0	22	
5	CUPS	14	5	3	6	27	28	−1	18	
6	'05 Kamo FC	14	4	3	7	23	29	−6	15	
7	AS Jamineiro (R)	14	2	2	10	18	43	−25	8	Relegated to Niigata Prefectural League
8	Teihens FC (R)	14	1	3	10	15	34	−19	6	Relegated to Ishikawa Prefectural League

(C) Champions; (P) Promoted; (R) Relegated

== Tōkai ==
=== Division 1 ===
Pos	Team	Pld	W	D	L	GF	GA	GD	Pts	Qualification or relegation
1	Suzuka Unlimited FC (C, Q)	14	11	1	2	35	11	+24	34	
2	FC Kariya (Q)	14	10	3	1	35	15	+20	33	
3	FC Ise-Shima	14	8	1	5	30	20	+10	25	
4	Chukyo univ. FC	14	8	1	5	28	22	+6	25	
5	Tokai Gakuen FC	14	5	1	8	24	30	−6	16	
6	Toyota Shukyu-dan	14	3	3	8	24	31	−7	12	
7	FC Gifu Second (R)	14	2	4	8	15	33	−18	10	Relegated to Div. 2
8	Tokoha University FC (R)	14	1	2	11	11	40	−29	5	Relegated to Div. 2

(C) Champions; (Q) Qualified for the Japan Regional Football Champions League; (R) Relegated

=== Division 2 ===
Pos	Team	Pld	W	D	L	GF	GA	GD	Pts	Promotion or relegation
1	Fujieda City Hall SC (C, P)	14	13	1	0	59	11	+48	40	Promoted to Div. 1
2	Yazaki Valente (P)	14	11	2	1	45	9	+36	35	Promoted to Div. 1
3	Chukyo University FC (Note: Chukyo University FC (中京大学FC, Chūkyō Daigaku Ffu Sī) is different from Chukyo univ. FC in Division 1. Both of them are subsidiary teams of the football club of Chukyo University.)	14	7	2	5	47	27	+20	23	
4	Nagoya SC	14	7	1	6	30	32	−2	22	
5	Toyota Industries SC	14	4	1	9	22	41	−19	13	
6	Nagara Club	14	4	1	9	16	42	−26	13	
7	Kasugai Club (R)	14	3	2	9	24	64	−40	11	Relegated to Aichi Prefectural League
8	TSV1973 Yokkaichi (R)	14	1	2	11	26	43	−17	5	Relegated to Mie Prefectural League

(C) Champions; (P) Promoted; (R) Relegated

== Kansai ==
=== Division 1 ===
Pos	Team	Pld	W	D	L	GF	GA	GD	Pts	Qualification or relegation
1	Ococias Kyoto AC (C, Q)	14	10	2	2	41	7	+34	32	
2	FC TIAMO Hirakata (Q)	14	8	3	3	36	28	+8	27	
3	Arterivo Wakayama	14	8	0	6	23	18	+5	24	
4	Kansai FC 2008	14	6	3	5	24	30	−6	21	
5	Hannan University SC	14	6	3	5	26	20	+6	21	
6	Banditonce Kakogawa	14	5	3	6	12	16	−4	18	
7	Lagend Shiga FC (R)	14	2	2	10	7	21	−14	8	Relegated to Div. 2
8	St. Andrew's University FC (R)	14	2	2	10	7	37	−30	8	Relegated to Div. 2

(C) Champions; (Q) Qualified for the Japan Regional Football Champions League; (R) Relegated

=== Division 2 ===
Pos	Team	Pld	W	D	L	GF	GA	GD	Pts	Promotion or relegation
1	Takasago Mineiro (C, P)	14	7	4	3	21	12	+9	25	Promoted to Div. 1
2	AS Laranja Kyoto (P)	14	7	4	3	24	20	+4	22 (Note: 3 points deducted for using a suspended player.)	Promoted to Div. 1
3	Ain Foods	14	6	3	5	25	19	+6	21	
4	FC EASY 02	14	5	3	6	23	22	+1	18	
5	Renaiss School Koga	14	5	2	7	23	24	−1	17	
6	Kyoto Shiko SC	14	4	5	5	16	22	−6	17	
7	Kandai Club 2010 (O)	14	4	4	6	18	27	−9	16	Relegation play-off
8	Diablossa Takada FC (R)	14	3	5	6	23	27	−4	14	Relegated to Osaka Prefectural League

(C) Champions; (O) Promotion/relegation playoffs; (P) Promoted; (R) Relegated

== Chūgoku ==
Pos	Team	Pld	W	D	L	GF	GA	GD	Pts	Qualification or relegation
1	Mitsubishi Motors Mizushima FC (C, Q)	18	15	1	2	47	18	+29	46	
2	Matsue City FC (Q)	18	14	2	2	82	18	+64	44	
3	SRC Hiroshima	18	11	2	5	51	34	+17	35	
4	Dezzolla Shimane	18	7	5	6	40	31	+9	26	
5	HATSUKAICHI FC	18	8	1	9	33	35	−2	25	
6	NTN Okayama	18	7	3	8	33	31	+2	24	
7	IPU FC	18	7	2	9	34	39	−5	23	
8	JXTG Mizushima FC	18	7	2	9	31	39	−8	23	
9	Panasonic Okayama SC (R)	18	2	2	14	15	61	−46	8	Relegated to Okayama Prefectural League
10	Yonago Genki SC (R)	18	1	2	15	14	74	−60	5	Relegated to Tottori Prefectural League

(C) Champions; (Q) Qualified for the Japan Regional Football Champions League; (R) Relegated

== Shikoku ==
Pos	Team	Pld	W	D	L	GF	GA	GD	Pts	Qualification
1	Kōchi United SC (C, Q)	14	12	2	0	83	5	+78	38	
2	FC Tokushima	14	9	4	1	41	13	+28	31	
3	KUFC Nangoku	14	7	2	5	29	29	0	23	
4	Tadotsu FC	14	6	3	5	26	30	−4	21	
5	R. VELHO Takamatsu	14	4	4	6	21	24	−3	16	
6	NIISHO Club	14	4	1	9	17	44	−27	13	
7	Llamas Kochi FC	14	3	3	8	17	35	−18	12	
8	Koyo Sealing Techno SC (O)	14	1	1	12	20	74	−54	4	Promotion/relegation playoffs

(C) Champions; (O) Promotion/relegation playoffs; (Q) Qualified for the Japan Regional Football Champions League

== Kyushu ==
Pos	Team	Pld	W	PKW	PKL	L	GF	GA	GD	Pts	Promotion or relegation
1	Tegevajaro Miyazaki (C, Q, P)	20	18	1	0	1	70	12	+58	56	Promoted to JFL
2	J.FC Miyazaki	20	15	2	0	3	47	15	+32	49	
3	Kyushu Mitsubishi Motors	20	8	6	1	5	41	40	+1	37	
4	Nippon Steel Oita	20	10	2	2	6	44	31	+13	36	
5	NIFS Kanoya Soccer Club	20	9	2	4	5	45	27	+18	35	
6	Kaiho Bank SC	20	8	4	1	7	38	40	−2	33	
7	FC Nakatsu	20	6	2	2	10	29	52	−23	24	
8	Kumamoto Teachers	20	5	1	4	10	25	45	−20	21	
9	Saga Lixil FC	20	4	2	1	13	27	39	−12	17	
10	Mitsubishi HI Nagasaki SC (R)	20	3	0	4	13	21	44	−23	13	Relegation to Nagasaki Prefectural League
11	FC Naha (R)	20	1	1	4	14	23	65	−42	9	Relegation to Okinawa Prefectural League

(C) Champion; (P) Promoted; (Q) Qualified for the Japan Regional Football Champions League; (R) Relegated

== See also ==
- Japanese Regional Leagues
