= 2020 Japanese Regional Leagues =

Japanese amateur leagues football season

Japanese Regional Leagues
- Season: 2020
- Promoted: Tiamo Hirakata; FC Kariya

The 2020 Japanese Regional Leagues (Japanese: 2020 地域リーグ, Hepburn: 2020 Chiiki Rīgu) was the 55th edition of the Japanese Regional Leagues, the fifth tier of the Japanese association football league system. A total of 120 teams competed, split into 9 groups, in the Japanese Regional Leagues. Due to the COVID-19 pandemic in Japan, all matches in some of the regions were changed from double round-robin into single round-robin, except Chūgoku and Tōkai which used a cup style knockout competition.

All regional champions qualified for the 2020 Regional Champions League. Like the J.League, there was no relegation in this season to Prefectural Leagues (promotion and relegation between divisions were still available for some regions).

== Champions list ==
Region	Champions
Hokkaido	Hokkaido Tokachi Sky Earth
Tohoku	Blancdieu Hirosaki
Kantō	Tochigi City
Hokushinetsu	Fukui United FC
Tōkai	FC Kariya
Kansai	Tiamo Hirakata
Chūgoku	SRC Hiroshima
Shikoku	FC Tokushima
Kyushu	Okinawa SV

== Hokkaido ==
Due to the impact of the new coronavirus, the following measures were taken for the implementation of the league.

- Each team played 7 games, which were the 2nd series in the round robin games.
- There will be no relegation from the Hokkaido League based on this year's performances.
- Promotion to the Hokkaido League will proceed as, with the top two teams in the Block League Finals getting promoted.
- Expanding number teams to ten for the following 2021 season.

Pos	Team	Pld	W	D	L	GF	GA	GD	Pts	
1	Hokkaido Tokachi Sky Earth (C, Q)	7	7	0	0	38	4	+34	21	Qualified to the 2020 Regional Champions League
2	Norbritz Hokkaido	7	6	0	1	38	5	+33	18	
3	Nippon Steel Muroran (ja)	7	5	0	2	23	11	+12	15	
4	Sapporo FC	7	4	0	3	28	10	+18	12	
5	Shintoku	7	3	0	4	13	32	−19	9	
6	Nippon Express	7	2	0	5	11	25	−14	6	
7	Sapporo University Goal Plunderers	7	1	0	6	8	29	−21	3	
8	Iwamizawa Hokushukai	7	0	0	7	7	50	−43	0	

Updated to match(es) played on 4 October 2020. Source: Soccerway
Rules for classification: 1) Points; 2) Goal difference; 3) Goals scored
(C) Champions; (Q) Qualified for the phase indicated
- The second match, Hokkaido Tokachi Sky Earth vs Shintoku FC, which was scheduled to be held on August 30, was cancelled, and Hokkaido Tokachi Sky Earth received a bye (treated as a 5-0 victory)
- The third match between Nippon Express FC and Hokkaido Tokachi Sky Earth, which was scheduled to be played on 6 September. The match was cancelled, and Hokkaido Tokachi Sky Earth received a bye (5-0 win).
- The match between Sapporo University Goal Plunderers and Nippon Express FC scheduled to be played on 20 September was cancelled, and Nippon Express FC received a bye (5-0 victory).

== Tohoku ==
=== Division 1 ===
Due to the impact of the new coronavirus, the following measures have been taken regarding the implementation of the league.

- Both the first and second divisions were changed from a round robin to a single round for each team.
- There is no relegation from the first division to the second division and from the second division to the prefectural leagues.

Pos	Team	Pld	W	D	L	GF	GA	GD	Pts	Qualification or relegation
1	Blancdieu Hirosaki (C, Q)	9	8	1	0	48	4	+44	25	Qualified for the 2020 Regional Champions League
2	Sendai University	9	7	1	1	29	12	+17	22	
3	Cobaltore Onagawa	9	6	3	0	31	7	+24	21	
4	Ganju Iwate	9	4	1	4	16	17	−1	13	
5	Nippon Steel Kamaishi	9	3	3	3	15	20	−5	12	
6	Primeiro	9	3	1	5	9	21	−12	10	
7	Morioka Zebra	9	2	2	5	10	22	−12	8	
8	Fuji Club 2003	9	1	4	4	14	23	−9	7	
9	Omiya	9	2	0	7	10	27	−17	6	
10	Saruta Kōgyō	9	0	2	7	5	34	−29	2	

Source: Soccerway
Rules for classification: 1) Points; 2) Goal difference; 3) Goals scored
(C) Champions; (Q) Qualified for the phase indicated

=== Division 2 ===
==== Division 2 North ====
- Due to the influence of the new coronavirus, TDK Shinwakai, Maritime Self-Defence Force Hachinohe, Hokuto Bank declined to participate.
- The Maritime Self-Defence Force Hachinohe withdrew from the league for the rest of the year.

Pos	Team	Pld	W	D	L	GF	GA	GD	Pts	Qualification or relegation
1	Tsutsukizaka FC (C, P)	4	2	1	1	11	4	+7	7	Promoted to Tohoku Division 1
2	Akita FC Cambiare	4	2	1	1	11	7	+4	7	
3	Mizusawa Club	4	2	1	1	6	3	+3	7	
4	Nu Perle Hiraizumi-Maesawa	4	1	1	2	5	6	−1	4	
5	Gonohe SC	4	1	0	3	3	16	−13	3	

Updated to match(es) played on 8 November 2020. Source: Tohoku FA standings, Tohoku FA results
Rules for classification: 1) Points, 2) Goal difference, 3) Total goals, 4) Head-to-head points, 5) Head-to-head goal difference, 6) Head-to-head goals, 7) Foul points, 8) Lottery
(C) Champions; (P) Promoted

==== Division 2 South ====
Pos	Team	Pld	W	D	L	GF	GA	GD	Pts	Qualification or relegation
1	Shichigahama SC (C, P)	9	8	0	1	60	5	+55	24	Promoted to Tohoku Division 1
2	Ricoh Industry Tohoku	9	6	1	2	33	6	+27	19	
3	Oyama Club	9	6	1	2	28	15	+13	19	
4	Sendai SASUKE.FC	9	6	0	3	36	13	+23	18	
5	FC La Universidad de Sendai	9	6	0	3	24	10	+14	18	
6	Merry	9	5	0	4	24	14	+10	15	
7	FC Para French Yonezawa	9	2	2	5	11	30	−19	8	
8	Soma Soccer Club	9	2	1	6	7	34	−27	7	
9	Mikawa SC	8	0	1	7	3	30	−27	1	
10	Bandits Iwaki FC	8	0	0	8	3	72	−69	0	Leaving the league

Updated to match(es) played on 29 November 2020. Source: Tohoku FA standings, Tohoku FA results
Rules for classification: 1) Points, 2) Goal difference, 3) Total goals, 4) Head-to-head points, 5) Head-to-head goal difference, 6) Head-to-head goals, 7) Foul points, 8) Lottery
(C) Champions; (P) Promoted
- The match between Mikawa SC and Bandits Iwaki FC on Matchday 18, which was scheduled to be held on October 25, has been cancelled. The treatment of the results is unknown

== Kantō ==
=== Division 1 ===
Pos	Team	Pld	W	D	L	GF	GA	GD	Pts	Promotion or qualification
1	Tochigi City	9	7	2	0	25	6	+19	23	Qualified to the 2020 Regional Champions League
2	Briobecca Urayasu	9	6	2	1	19	10	+9	20	
3	Tokyo United	9	6	1	2	15	7	+8	19	
4	Vonds Ichihara	9	5	2	2	15	7	+8	17	
5	Criacao Shinjuku	9	5	0	4	11	7	+4	15	
6	Hitachi Building Systems	9	3	1	5	10	17	−7	10	
7	Ryutsu Keizai Dragons Ryugasaki	9	3	0	6	18	14	+4	9	
8	Tokyo 23	9	2	3	4	6	14	−8	9	Qualified to the Relegation play-off
9	Ryutsu Keizai University	9	1	1	7	6	28	−22	4	Relegated to the 2021 Kantō Soccer League Division 2
10	Joyful Honda Tsukuba	9	1	0	8	8	23	−15	3	Relegated to the 2021 Kantō Soccer League Division 2

Source: Soccerway, Goal Note Cloud, Kanto Soccer League
Rules for classification: 1) Points; 2) Goal difference; 3) Goals scored

== Hokushin'etsu ==
=== Division 1 ===
Pos	Team	Pld	W	D	L	GF	GA	GD	Pts	Promotion or qualification
1	Fukui United	7	7	0	0	18	4	+14	21	Qualified to the 2020 Regional Champions League
2	Artista Asama	7	5	1	1	11	3	+8	16	
3	Toyama Shinjo	7	5	0	2	20	11	+9	15	
4	Japan Soccer College	7	4	1	2	12	9	+3	13	
5	Niigata UHW	7	2	0	5	13	12	+1	6	
6	Hokuriku University	7	2	0	5	6	10	−4	6	
7	Sakai Phoenix	7	1	0	6	8	20	−12	3	Relegated to the 2021 Hokushin'etsu Soccer League Division 2
8	Kamo	7	1	0	6	6	25	−19	3	Relegated to the 2021 Hokushin'etsu Soccer League Division 2

Updated to match(es) played on 27 September 2020. Source: Soccerway, Hokushinetsu Football League
Rules for classification: 1) Points; 2) Goal difference; 3) Goals scored

== Tōkai ==
Owing to the coronavirus pandemic, the Tōkai region played a knockout tournament to decide the team qualifying for the 2020 Regional Promotion Series (for Division 1 only).

As a general rule, all teams participating in the Tokai League will participate. Regardless of the decline in participation or performance,

- There was no promotion / relegation between the 1st and 2nd divisions.
- There was no relegation to the prefectural league.
- All matches were played in a knockout tournament format.
- In addition to the final and third-place play-off, there will be a fifth-place play-off (so that all teams will play at least two games).
- In Division 1, Yazaki Valente FC (ja) did not participate, so FC Kariya received a bye to the semi-finals.
- On September 2, Fujieda City Hall withdrew from participating, so Chukyo University FC received a walkover.

=== Division 1 Bracket ===
Quarter-finals
Fujieda City Hall SC
Chukyo University FC	w/o
Tokai Gakuen FC	4
Chukyo univ. FC	0
FC Ise-Shima	2 (3)
Tokoha University	2 (5)

Semi-finals
FC Kariya	1
Chukyo University FC	0
Tokai Gakuen FC	3
Tokoha University	1

Final
FC Kariya	4
Tokai Gakuen FC	1

- FC Kariya, won the championship, and therefore qualified for the Regional CL 2020 where they finished as runners-up and were promoted to the JFL.

- In Division 2, Bombonera (ja) did not participate, so Toyota FC (ja) received a bye to the semi-finals.

=== Division 2 Bracket ===
Quarter-finals
Nagara Club	0
Nagoya SC	4
AS Kariya	5
Rivielta Toyokawa	1
FC Gifu SECOND	3
Yokkaichi University	2

Semi-finals
Toyota FC	3
Nagoya SC	0
AS Kariya	1
FC Gifu SECOND	0

Final
Toyota FC	1
AS Kariya	0

== Kansai ==
=== Division 1 ===
Pos	Team	Pld	W	D	L	GF	GA	GD	Pts	Qualification or relegation
1	Tiamo Hirakata (C, P)	7	3	4	0	14	6	+8	13	Qualified for the 2020 Regional Champions League and was promoted to the JFL
2	Laranja Kyoto (Q)	7	4	1	2	14	9	+5	13	Participated in the 2020 Regional Champions League
3	Cento Cuore Harima	7	4	1	2	11	6	+5	13	
4	Ococias Kyoto	7	3	2	2	11	11	0	11	
5	Kandai Club 2010	7	3	2	2	8	8	0	11	
6	Arterivo Wakayama	7	2	2	3	9	15	−6	8	
7	Porvenir Kashihara	7	1	2	4	6	8	−2	5	
8	Lagend Shiga (Q)	7	0	2	5	1	11	−10	2	Participated in the relegation / promotion match v Hannan University Club and remained.

Updated to match(es) played on 3 October 2020. Source: Soccerway
Rules for classification: 1) Points; 2) Goal difference; 3) Goals scored
(C) Champions; (P) Promoted; (Q) Qualified for the phase indicated

==== Relegation / promotion Playoff ====
12 December 2020
12:00

Legend Shiga FC (KSL Division 1, 8th place)	3-2	Hannan University Club (KSL Division 2, 2nd place)
	Report

Sanga Stadium by KYOCERA
Referee: Kenji Wakamiya
- According to the regulations, if teams draw their playoff match, the team in the higher division retains it place.

=== Division 2 ===
This is the 16th edition of the Kansai Football League Division 2

Pos	Team	Pld	W	D	L	GF	GA	GD	Pts	Qualification or relegation
1	Sekidai Club 2010	7	6	1	0	16	7	+9	19	Promoted to Division 1
2	Hannan University Club	7	6	0	1	30	13	+17	18	Participated in the Promotion / Relegation playoff v Lagend Shiga in Division 1.
3	Kyoto Shiko SC (ja)	7	4	2	1	15	10	+5	14	
4	Moriyama Samurai 2000	7	3	2	2	10	12	−2	11	
5	St. Andrew's FC	7	3	0	4	22	16	+6	9	
6	FC EASY 02 Akashi	7	2	0	5	9	18	−9	6	
7	Takasago Mineiro FC	7	1	1	5	9	17	−8	4	
8	Kyoto City Fire Department	7	0	0	7	5	23	−18	0	

Updated to match(es) played on 25 October 2020. Source:

== Chūgoku ==
- Due to the coronavirus pandemic, the Chūgoku region played in a tournament known as the CSL Championship 2020, or C-1 Cup, with eight teams competing for a spot in the 2020 Regional Promotion Series.
- Of the ten teams participating in the Chūgoku league, the teams that have obtained permission from the management body and parent company participated. Regardless of C-1's performance or non-participation, there will be no relegation to the prefectural league.
- All participating teams were divided into two groups, each of which participated in a first-round preliminary round-robin.
- The top two teams from each of the preliminary leagues (4 teams in total) competed in the final tournament.
- The winning team qualified for the 2020 Regional Champions League.

=== Group stage ===
- The dates were announced on July 14, NTN Okayama and Dezzolla Shimane did not participate in this season competition.

==== Group A ====
- On August 24, Yonago Genki SC (Group A) withdrew.
- Group A was changed to a round-robin of three teams.

Pos	Team	Pld	W	D	L	GF	GA	GD	Pts	Qualification
1	Baleine Shimonoseki	2	2	0	0	6	3	+3	6	Qualified to the Knockout stage
2	SRC Hiroshima	2	1	0	1	4	2	+2	3	Qualified to the Knockout stage
3	Energy Mizushima	2	0	0	2	2	7	−5	0	
4	Yonago Genki	0	0	0	0	0	0	0	0	Withdrawn

Updated to match(es) played on 13 September 2020. Source: Soccerway
Rules for classification: 1) Points; 2) Goal difference; 3) Goals scored

==== Group B ====
Pos	Team	Pld	W	D	L	GF	GA	GD	Pts	Qualification
1	Mitsubishi Mizushima	3	2	1	0	4	0	+4	7	Qualified to the Knockout stage
2	Fuji Xerox Hiroshima	3	1	1	1	4	5	−1	4	Qualified to the Knockout stage
3	Bergarosso Hamada	3	1	0	2	4	5	−1	3	
4	Pacific University	3	1	0	2	4	6	−2	3	

Updated to match(es) played on 13 September 2020. Source: Soccerway
Rules for classification: 1) Points; 2) Goal difference; 3) Goals scored

=== Knockout stage ===
Semi-finals; September 20th
1A	FC Baleine Shimonoseki	2 (5)
2B	Fuji Xerox Hiroshima	2 (3)
1B	Mitsubishi Mizushima	0 (2)
2A	SRC Hiroshima	0 (4)

Final; September 27th
FC Baleine Shimonoseki	0
SRC Hiroshima	2

== Shikoku ==
- All matches in the first half (up to Matchday 7) were cancelled.
- No team will be relegated, but the winner of the Shikoku League Challenge Team Finals (ja) will be promoted.
- On February 17, 2021, a lottery was scheduled to be held to determine the promoted team, but Tokushima, Kagawa, and Ehime prefectures declined to participate in the lottery. In the subsequent discussions, it was decided to promote the Nakamura club representing Kochi Prefecture.

Pos	Team	Pld	W	D	L	GF	GA	GD	Pts	Qualification
1	FC Tokushima (Q)	7	7	0	0	29	3	+26	21	Qualified for the 2020 Regional Champions League
2	Nankoku	7	6	0	1	26	4	+22	18	
3	Llamas Kochi	7	4	0	3	14	10	+4	12	
4	Tadotsu	7	4	0	3	15	13	+2	12	
5	Lavenirosso	7	1	2	4	12	20	−8	5	
6	R. Velho Takamatsu	7	1	2	4	15	29	−14	5	
7	Yanagimachi	7	1	1	5	8	22	−14	4	
8	Koyo Sealing Techno	7	1	1	5	11	29	−18	4	

Source: Soccerway
Rules for classification: 1) Points; 2) Goal difference; 3) Goals scored
(Q) Qualified for the phase indicated

== Kyushu ==
- On August 11, the Kyushu League was abandoned, due to Kaiho Bank's withdrawal (On July 31, after the 13th matchday) and the spread of coronavirus in Okinawa and Kumamoto. Okinawa SV, as the 2019 Kyushu League champions, are elected to play in the 2020 Regional Champions League.
- All matches in the first half (up to Matchday 9) were cancelled.
- Only the second half Matchdays 10-18, which commenced on 27 June 2020 were to be played.
- Nippon Steel Oita declined to participate, therefore a total of thirty-six games (8 matches for each team) were held.
- No automatic relegation or relegation.
- Kyushu qualified for the rotation replenishment slot, so in addition to Okinawa SV, J.FC MIYAZAKI, which ranked second last year (2019), participated in the 2020 Regional Champions League.

=== League table at the time of abandonment ===
Pos	Team	Pld	W	PW	PL	L	GF	GA	GD	Pts	Qualification
1	Okinawa (Q)	4	3	1	0	0	12	2	+10	11	Qualified for the 2020 Regional Champions League
2	Miyazaki (Q)	3	3	0	0	0	12	2	+10	9	Qualified for the 2020 Regional Champions League
3	Kumamoto Teachers	3	2	1	0	0	6	3	+3	8	
4	Saga LIXIL	3	2	1	0	0	4	2	+2	8	
5	Kaiho Bank	3	0	1	1	1	2	3	−1	3	
6	Kawasoe Club	4	1	0	0	3	6	10	−4	3	
7	Kyushu Mitsubishi Motors	4	1	0	0	3	3	12	−9	3	
8	NIFS Kanoya	4	0	0	2	2	3	6	−3	2	
9	Nakatsu	4	0	0	1	3	1	9	−8	1	
10	Nippon Steel Oita	0	0	0	0	0	0	0	0	0	Withdrew

Source: Soccerway, KYFA
Rules for classification: 1) Points 2) Goal difference 3) Goals scored
(Q) Qualified to the phase indicated

== See also ==
- Japan Football Association (JFA)

League(s)

- J.League
  - 2020 J1 League (Tier 1)
  - 2020 J2 League (Tier 2)
  - 2020 J3 League (Tier 3)
- 2020 Japan Football League (JFL) (Tier 4)
- 2020 Regional Champions League (Promotion playoffs to JFL)

Cup(s)

- 2020 Fuji Xerox Super Cup
- 2020 Emperor's Cup (National Open Cup)
- 2020 J.League YBC Levain Cup (League Cup)
