= 2014 Japanese Regional Leagues =

Japanese amateur leagues football season

Japanese Regional Leagues
- Season: 2014
- Promoted: Nara Club; FC Osaka

The 2014 Japanese Regional Leagues were a competition between parallel association football leagues ranking at the bottom of the Japan Football League.
Statistics of Japanese Regional Leagues in the 2014 season.

== Champions list ==
Region	Champions
Hokkaido	Tokachi Fairsky FC
Tohoku	FC Ganju Iwate
Kantō	Urayasu SC
Hokushinetsu	Saurcos Fukui
Tokai	FC Suzuka Rampole
Kansai	Nara Club
Chugoku	Matsue City FC
Shikoku	Kochi University Torastar FC
Kyushu	Nippon Steel Corp. Oita

== Hokkaido ==
Pos	Team	Pld	W	D	L	GF	GA	GD	Pts	Qualification or relegation
1	Tokachi Fairsky FC (C, Q)	14	12	1	1	47	16	+31	37	
2	Sapporo Football Club	14	10	1	3	44	17	+27	31	
3	Norbritz Hokkaido	14	10	1	3	41	20	+21	31	
4	Nippon Steel Kamaishi	14	7	1	6	34	45	−11	22	
5	Sapporo Goal Plunderers	14	6	1	7	34	31	+3	19	
6	Imamizawa FC Hokushukai	14	4	1	9	26	40	−14	13	
7	R. Supelbe (R)	14	3	0	11	22	48	−26	9	Relegated
8	Komazawa OB ・ FC (R)	14	1	0	13	15	46	−31	3	Relegated

(C) Champions; (Q) Qualified for the phase indicated; (R) Relegated

== Tohoku ==
=== Division 1 ===
Pos	Team	Pld	W	D	L	GF	GA	GD	Pts	Qualification or relegation
1	FC Ganju Iwate (C, Q)	18	16	2	0	129	5	+124	50	
2	Cobaltore Onagawa	18	15	2	1	59	8	+51	47	
3	ReinMeer Aomori FC	18	13	2	3	56	16	+40	41	
4	Fuji Club 2003	18	9	0	9	30	35	−5	27	
5	FC Primeiro	18	7	4	7	37	46	−9	25	
6	Bandits Iwaki FC	18	6	3	9	20	47	−27	21	
7	Akita FC Cambiare	18	6	2	10	27	57	−30	20	
8	Morioka Zebra	18	4	3	11	26	55	−29	15	
9	Merry FC (R)	18	3	2	13	18	53	−35	11	Relegated to Division 2
10	Shiogama N.T.F.C. Wiese	18	1	0	17	11	91	−80	3	Disbanded

(C) Champions; (Q) Qualified for the phase indicated; (R) Relegated

=== Division 2 North ===
Pos	Team	Pld	W	D	L	GF	GA	GD	Pts	Promotion or relegation
1	Blancdieu Hirosaki FC (C, P)	18	16	2	0	64	10	+54	50	Promoted to Division 1
2	Saruta Kōgyō S.C. [tl]	18	13	3	2	59	15	+44	42	
3	TDK Shinwakai	18	11	3	4	36	25	+11	36	
4	Akita University School of Medicine	18	6	6	6	24	33	−9	24	
5	Mizusawa Club	18	7	2	9	31	28	+3	23	
6	FC Fuji 08	18	6	4	8	26	41	−15	22	
7	Nippon Steel Kamaishi	18	6	3	9	34	29	+5	21	
8	Omiya Club	18	3	4	11	27	47	−20	13	
9	Oirase FC (R)	18	3	2	13	19	48	−29	11	Relegated Prefectural Leagues
10	Iwate Soccer Club (R)	18	2	5	11	23	65	−42	11	Relegated Prefectural Leagues

(C) Champions; (P) Promoted; (R) Relegated

=== Division 2 South ===
Pos	Team	Pld	W	D	L	GF	GA	GD	Pts	Promotion or relegation
1	Iwaki Furukawa FC (C, P)	18	12	2	4	47	18	+29	38	Promoted to Division 1
2	FC Scheinen Fukushima	18	11	1	6	63	39	+24	34	
3	Sendai Nakada FC	18	10	2	6	45	39	+6	32	
4	Sendai Sasuke FC	18	9	4	5	58	33	+25	31	
5	Marysol Matsushima SC	18	8	5	5	44	39	+5	29	
6	FC Parafrente Yonezawa	18	8	4	6	29	26	+3	28	
7	Soma SC	18	8	3	7	32	29	+3	27	
8	Toroku Club	18	6	2	10	29	38	−9	20	
9	Kureha (R)	18	3	2	13	13	53	−40	11	Relegated Prefectural Leagues
10	Tozawa FC (R)	18	1	3	14	16	62	−46	6	Relegated Prefectural Leagues

Source: rsssf.com
(C) Champions; (P) Promoted; (R) Relegated

== Kantō ==
=== Division 1 ===
Pos	Team	Pld	W	D	L	GF	GA	GD	Pts	Qualification or relegation
1	Urayasu SC (C, Q)	18	12	5	1	46	10	+36	41	
2	Tokyo 23 FC	18	10	6	2	36	17	+19	36	
3	Vonds Ichihara (Q)	18	8	6	4	37	27	+10	30	
4	FC Korea	18	8	4	6	26	25	+1	28	
5	Ryutsu Keizai University FC	18	7	4	7	29	28	+1	25	
6	Vertfee Takahara Nasu	18	6	7	5	25	24	+1	25	
7	Tonan Maebashi	18	6	4	8	26	33	−7	22	
8	Hitachi Building System	18	5	4	9	22	38	−16	19	
9	Saitama SC	18	3	4	11	21	37	−16	13	
10	Aries FC Tokyo (R)	18	1	4	13	14	43	−29	7	Relegated to Div. 2

Source: rsssf.com
(C) Champions; (Q) Qualified for the phase indicated; (R) Relegated

=== Division 2 ===
Pos	Team	Pld	W	D	L	GF	GA	GD	Pts	Promotion or relegation
1	Tsukuba FC (C, P)	18	13	2	3	55	21	+34	41	Promoted to Div. 1
2	Club Dragons (P, Q)	18	10	3	5	42	31	+11	33	
3	Yokohama Takeru	18	7	5	6	28	30	−2	26	
4	JMSDF Atsugi Air Base	18	7	4	7	25	27	−2	25	
5	Nippon Engineering College F.Marinos	18	7	3	8	23	24	−1	24	
6	Kanagawa FC	18	6	6	6	29	33	−4	24	
7	Toho Titanium SC	18	7	2	9	33	34	−1	23	
8	Sakado City FC	18	6	3	9	25	36	−11	21	
9	Tonan Maebashi Reserves	18	5	4	9	26	37	−11	19	
10	Tokio Marine & Nichido Fire Insurance (R)	18	5	2	11	27	40	−13	17	Relegated

Source: rsssf.com
(C) Champions; (P) Promoted; (Q) Qualified for the phase indicated; (R) Relegated

== Hokushinetsu ==
=== Division 1 ===
Pos	Team	Pld	W	D	L	GF	GA	GD	Pts	Qualification or relegation
1	Saurcos Fukui (C, Q)	14	13	0	1	48	5	+43	39	
2	Japan Soccer College	14	11	1	2	43	15	+28	34	
3	Artista Tomi	14	9	1	4	39	20	+19	28	
4	FC Ueda Gentian	14	6	3	5	28	27	+1	21	
5	Valiente Toyama	14	3	2	9	14	33	−19	11	
6	FC Antelope Shiojiri	14	3	2	9	15	38	−23	11	
7	FC Hokuriku (R)	14	2	4	8	18	34	−16	10	Relegated to Div. 2
8	Sakai Phoenix (R)	14	2	1	11	14	47	−33	7	Relegated to Div. 2

Source: rsssf.com
(C) Champions; (Q) Qualified for the phase indicated; (R) Relegated

=== Division 2 ===
Pos	Team	Pld	W	D	L	GF	GA	GD	Pts	Promotion or relegation
1	Okuetsu Football Club (C, P)	14	10	3	1	32	15	+17	33	Promoted to Div. 1
2	Toyama Shinjo Club (P)	14	10	1	3	37	14	+23	31	Promoted to Div. 1
3	AS Jamineiro	14	6	3	5	26	28	−2	21	
4	'09 Keidai FC	14	5	3	6	26	24	+2	18	
5	FC Abies	14	6	0	8	22	37	−15	18	
6	Teihens FC	14	4	3	7	29	27	+2	15	
7	Hokuriku Futures (R)	14	5	0	9	25	32	−7	15	Relegated
8	Nagaoka Billboard FC (R)	14	3	1	10	18	38	−20	10	Relegated

Source: rsssf.com
(C) Champions; (P) Promoted; (R) Relegated

== Tōkai ==
=== Division 1 ===
Pos	Team	Pld	W	D	L	GF	GA	GD	Pts	Qualification or relegation
1	FC Suzuka Rampole (C, Q)	14	11	0	3	33	15	+18	33	
2	Fujieda City Hall SC	14	7	2	5	37	27	+10	23	
3	Chukyo University FC	14	7	2	5	27	28	−1	23	
4	F.C. Kariya	14	6	2	6	19	19	0	20	
5	Yazaki Valente	14	6	0	8	19	21	−2	18	
6	FC Gifu SECOND	14	5	2	7	26	29	−3	17	
7	Nagoya SC (R)	14	5	1	8	19	29	−10	16	Relegated to Div. 2
8	Toyota Shukyudan (R)	14	4	1	9	26	38	−12	13	Relegated to Div. 2

Source: rsssf.com
(C) Champions; (Q) Qualified for the phase indicated; (R) Relegated

=== Division 2 ===
Pos	Team	Pld	W	D	L	GF	GA	GD	Pts	Promotion or relegation
1	Tokoha University FC (C, P)	14	11	1	2	44	14	+30	34	Promoted to Div. 1
2	Nagara Club (P)	14	7	1	6	37	24	+13	22	Promoted to Div. 1
3	TSV1973 Yokkaichi	14	6	4	4	18	22	−4	22	
4	Toyota Industries SC	14	6	2	6	36	29	+7	20	
5	FC Kawasaki	14	4	4	6	18	34	−16	16	
6	Kasugai Club	14	4	3	7	23	30	−7	15	
7	JTEKT Soccer Club (R)	14	4	3	7	22	34	−12	15	Relegated
8	Ise YAMATO FC (R)	14	2	6	6	18	29	−11	12	Relegated

Source: rsssf.com
(C) Champions; (P) Promoted; (R) Relegated

== Kansai ==
=== Division 1 ===
Pos	Team	Pld	W	D	L	GF	GA	GD	Pts	Promotion or qualification
1	Nara Club (C, P, Q)	14	10	3	1	30	11	+19	33	Promoted to JFL
2	FC Osaka (P, Q)	14	9	4	1	37	15	+22	31	Promoted to JFL
3	Arterivo Wakayama	14	7	2	5	30	23	+7	23	
4	Banditonce Kakogawa	14	6	4	4	15	16	−1	22	
5	Amitie SC	14	5	2	7	21	23	−2	17	
6	Lagend Shiga FC	14	4	3	7	17	23	−6	15	
7	Kansai FC 2008	14	2	3	9	17	37	−20	9	
8	Hannan University FC	14	1	3	10	13	32	−19	6	

Source: rsssf.com
(C) Champions; (P) Promoted; (Q) Qualified for the phase indicated

=== Division 2 ===
Pos	Team	Pld	W	D	L	GF	GA	GD	Pts	Promotion
1	FC Tiamo Hirakata (C, P)	14	8	1	5	33	24	+9	25	Promoted to Div. 1
2	AS.Laranja Kyoto (P)	14	6	5	3	24	14	+10	23	Promoted to Div. 1
3	Takasago Mineiro	14	6	4	4	23	30	−7	22	
4	Ain Foods	14	6	2	6	26	20	+6	20	
5	Kwansei Gakuin University SC	14	5	5	4	24	23	+1	20	
6	Diablossa Takada FC	14	5	4	5	15	18	−3	19	
7	Kyoto Shiko Club	14	3	4	7	19	22	−3	13	
8	Tatsuno FC	14	3	3	8	11	24	−13	12	

Source: rsssf.com
(C) Champions; (P) Promoted

== Chūgoku ==
Pos	Team	Pld	W	D	L	GF	GA	GD	Pts	Promotion or relegation
1	Matsue City (P, Q)	18	12	2	4	50	20	+30	38	
2	Dezzolla Shimane	18	10	4	4	46	31	+15	34	
3	Mitsubishi Motors Mizushima FC	18	10	3	5	41	23	+18	33	
4	SRC Hiroshima	18	9	5	4	68	35	+33	32	
5	JX Nippon Oil & Energy Mizushima FC	18	8	4	6	41	50	−9	28	
6	Fuji Xerox Hiroshima S.C.	18	8	2	8	30	28	+2	26	
7	NTN Okayama	18	6	3	9	30	39	−9	21	
8	Sagawa Chugoku SC	18	5	5	8	27	37	−10	20	
9	FC UBE Yahhh-man (R)	18	5	2	11	37	53	−16	17	Relegated
10	Hitachi Kasado (R)	18	1	2	15	10	64	−54	5	Relegated

Source: rsssf.com
(P) Promoted; (Q) Qualified for the phase indicated; (R) Relegated

== Shikoku ==
Pos	Team	Pld	W	D	L	GF	GA	GD	Pts	Qualification or relegation
1	Kochi University Torastar FC (C, Q)	14	12	1	1	79	14	+65	37	
2	Igosso Kōchi FC	14	11	1	2	82	17	+65	34	
3	F.C. Imabari	14	11	1	2	78	16	+62	34	
4	R.VELHO	14	7	2	5	33	26	+7	23	
5	Tadotsu FC	14	4	1	9	20	59	−39	13	
6	llamas Kochi FC	14	4	0	10	22	45	−23	12	
7	Nakamura Club	14	4	0	10	17	91	−74	12	Relegation play-off
8	Minami Club (R)	14	0	0	14	5	68	−63	0	Relegated

Source: rsssf.com
(C) Champions; (Q) Qualified for the phase indicated; (R) Relegated

== Kyushu ==
Pos	Team	Pld	W	PKW	PKL	L	GF	GA	GD	Pts	Result
1	Nippon Steel Oita (C, Q)	18	13	0	0	5	55	30	+25	39	
2	Kaiho Bank SC	18	10	3	1	4	51	25	+26	37	
3	Kagoshima United FC Second	18	10	1	3	4	36	20	+16	35	
4	Kyushu Mitsubishi Motors	18	10	1	2	5	42	30	+12	34	
5	Mitsubishi HI Nagasaki SC	18	10	0	3	5	50	21	+29	33	
6	FC Nankatsu	18	7	5	1	5	37	29	+8	32	
7	MSU FC	18	3	3	2	10	23	54	−31	17	
8	FC Naha	18	5	0	1	12	19	38	−19	16	
9	Saga LIXIL F.C.	18	4	1	0	13	24	44	−20	14	Relegation play-off
10	Nanakuma Tombies (R)	18	2	2	3	11	22	69	−47	13	Relegated

Source: rsssf.com
(C) Champion; (Q) Qualified to the phase indicated; (R) Relegated
