= Hokkaido Soccer League =

- Founded: 1978; 48 years ago
- Country: Japan
- Confederation: AFC
- Divisions: 1
- Number of clubs: 8
- Level on pyramid: 5
- Promotion to: Japan Football League
- Relegation to: Block Leagues
- Domestic cup: Emperor's Cup
- Current champions: BTOP Hokkaido (2025)
- Most championships: Norbritz Hokkaido (18)
- Website: hfa-dream.or.jp
- Current: 2026 Japanese Regional Leagues

Hokkaido Soccer League (北海道サッカーリーグ, Hokkaidō Sakkā Rīgu) is the Japanese fifth tier of league football, which is part of the Japanese Regional Leagues. It covers the prefecture/region of Hokkaidō.

Hokkaido is the only regional league whose clubs have never been promoted. The top representative of Hokkaido in the Japanese league system, Consadole Sapporo, entered the J.League after moving from the Kanto region in 1995.

== Overview ==
The Hokkaido Soccer League is the fifth tier in the Japanese soccer structure and the block leagues below correspond to the sixth tier. There are four block leagues under the Hokkaido Soccer League, and district-based leagues are established under them. As of 2022, there are fifteen district leagues under the four main block leagues.

Eight teams from all over Hokkaido participate in the competition, and the winners participate in the Regional Football League Competition. There is relegation to the Block leagues below this level, usually the teams that finish in the bottom two places in the league standings are relegated.

Hokkaido is the only prefecture participating in this league, but it is treated as a regional league. In Hokkaido, the block league is the equivalent of the prefectural league that exists in other prefectures.

== History ==
Established in 1978, it led to the formation of a football league in every region. This year, four teams that were chosen through preliminary rounds took part, with Hakodate 76 FC (later known as Blackpecker Hakodate FC and now defunct) claiming the championship title. The following year, in 1979, the number of teams was increased to six, then to eight in 1980, and finally to ten in 1984.

In 1989 a second division was created and stayed in existence until it was disbanded in 2003 in favour of the Block League system currently in place.

From 2009 onwards, the number of teams was decreased from eight to six. Teruo Kumagai, the president of the Hokkaido Football Association at that time, mentioned that he anticipated challenging matches for survival and aimed to prevent a congested schedule. Starting in 2011, the tournament resumed with eight teams.

In 2020, due to the effects of the coronavirus pandemic, the number of matches was limited to a single round-robin format, and there was no relegation from the Hokkaido league (though promotion from the block league occurred). Consequently, in 2021, ten teams competed in a round-robin format, with the 9th and 10th places facing automatic relegation, while the 7th and 8th places would compete in the block league finals.

== District associations and divisions ==
Levels mentioned are according to overall position in the Japanese football league system.

Regional League (level 5)	Block League (level 6)			District League (level 7)	Jurisdiction
Regional League (level 5)	Since 2019	From 2012 to 2018	From 2003 to 2011	District League (level 7)	Jurisdiction
Hokkaido	Sapporo	Sapporo	Central Hokkaido	Sapporo	Northern Ishikari Subprefecture
Hokkaido	Central and Northern Hokkaido	Central Hokkaido	Central Hokkaido	Chitose	Southern Ishikari Subprefecture
Hokkaido	Central and Northern Hokkaido	Central Hokkaido	Central Hokkaido	Otaru	Shiribeshi Subprefecture
Hokkaido	Central and Northern Hokkaido	Central Hokkaido	Northern Hokkaido	Sorachi	Southern Sorachi Subprefecture
Hokkaido	Central and Northern Hokkaido	Northern Hokkaido	Northern Hokkaido	Kita-Sorachi	Northern Sorachi Subprefecture
Hokkaido	Central and Northern Hokkaido	Northern Hokkaido	Northern Hokkaido	Asahikawa	Southern Kamikawa Subprefecture, Southern Rumoi Subprefecture
Hokkaido	Central and Northern Hokkaido	Northern Hokkaido	Northern Hokkaido	Dōhoku	Northern Kamikawa Subprefecture, Northern Rumoi Subprefecture
Hokkaido	Central and Northern Hokkaido	Northern Hokkaido	Northern Hokkaido	Sōya	Soya Subprefecture
Hokkaido	Southern Hokkaido	Southern Hokkaido	Southern Hokkaido	Hakodate	Oshima Subprefecture, Hiyama Subprefecture
Hokkaido	Southern Hokkaido	Southern Hokkaido	Southern Hokkaido	Muroran	Western Iburi Subprefecture
Hokkaido	Southern Hokkaido	Southern Hokkaido	Southern Hokkaido	Tomakomai	Eastern Iburi Subprefecture, Hidaka Subprefecture
Hokkaido	Eastern Hokkaido	Eastern Hokkaido	Eastern Hokkaido	Tokachi	Tokachi Subprefecture
Hokkaido	Eastern Hokkaido	Eastern Hokkaido	Eastern Hokkaido	Kushiro	Kushiro Subprefecture
Hokkaido	Eastern Hokkaido	Eastern Hokkaido	Eastern Hokkaido	Nemuro	Nemuro Subprefecture
Hokkaido	Eastern Hokkaido	Eastern Hokkaido	Eastern Hokkaido	Okhotsk	Okhotsk Subprefecture

== 2026 clubs ==
#	Team	Hometown	Block	District	Notes
1.	Hokkaido Tokachi Sky Earth	Obihiro, Hokkaido	Eastern	Tokachi	
2.	BTOP Hokkaido	Kuriyama, Hokkaido	Central	Sorachi	2025 Champions
3.	Norbritz Hokkaido FC	Ebetsu, Hokkaido	Sapporo	Sapporo	
4.	Sapporo University Goal Plunderers (ja)	Sapporo, Hokkaido	Sapporo	Sapporo	
5.	ASC Hokkaido (ja)	Atsuma, Hokkaido	Southern	Tomakomai	
6.	Sabas FC	Sapporo, Hokkaido	Sapporo	Sapporo	
7.	Sapporo FC (ja)	Sapporo, Hokkaido	Sapporo	Sapporo	Promotion (1st place in Block Final)
8.	Hokushukai Iwamizawa (ja)	Iwamizawa, Hokkaido	Central & Northern Hokkaido	Sorachi	Promotion (2nd place in Block Final)

== Hokkaido Soccer League Champions ==
Year	Winner
1978	Hakodate 1976 (1)
1979	Nippon Steel Muroran (1)
1980	Hakodate 1976 (2)
1981	Sapporo Mazda (1)
1982	Nippon Steel Muroran (2)
1983	Sapporo Mazda (2)
1984	Sapporo Mazda (3)
1985	Sapporo Shūkyū (1)
1986	Sapporo Shūkyū (2)
1987	Sapporo Mazda (4)
1988	Sapporo Mazda (5)
1989	Sapporo Mazda (6)
1990	Nippon Steel Muroran (3)
1991	Sapporo Mazda (7)
1992	Hokuden (1)
1993	Hokkaido Electric Power (2)
1994	Nippon Steel Muroran (4)
1995	Hokkaido Electric Power (3)
1996	Hokkaido Electric Power (4)
1997	Hokkaido Electric Power (5)
1998	Hokkaido Electric Power (6)
1999	Hokkaido Electric Power (7)
2000	Hokkaido Electric Power (8)
2001	Barefoot Hokkaido (1)
2002	Barefoot Hokkaido (2)
2003	Hokkaido Electric Power (9)
2004	Norbritz Hokkaido (10)
2005	Norbritz Hokkaido (11)
2006	Norbritz Hokkaido (12)
2007	Norbritz Hokkaido (13)
2008	Norbritz Hokkaido (14)
2009	Sapporo U. Goal Plunderers (1)
2010	Sapporo U. Goal Plunderers (2)
2011	Norbritz Hokkaido (15)
2012	Norbritz Hokkaido (16)
2013	Norbritz Hokkaido (17)
2014	Tokachi Fairsky FC (1)
2015	Sapporo Shūkyū (3)
2016	Norbritz Hokkaido (18)
2017	Tokachi FC (2)
2018	Hokkaido Tokachi Sky Earth (3)
2019	Hokkaido Tokachi Sky Earth (4)
2020	Hokkaido Tokachi Sky Earth (5)
2021	not awarded (Note: Due to the influence of the new coronavirus pandemic, the tournament was discontinued after only 5 matchdays were played. The ranking was decided according to the ranking at that time, but no champion was declared.)
2022	BTOP Hokkaido (1)
2023	BTOP Hokkaido (2)
2024	Hokkaido Tokachi Sky Earth (6)
2025	BTOP Hokkaido (3)
2026	
