= 2015 Japanese Regional Leagues =

Japanese amateur leagues football season

Japanese Regional Leagues
- Season: 2015
- Promoted: Briobecca Urayasu

The 2015 Japanese Regional Leagues were a competition between parallel association football leagues ranking at the bottom of the Japan Football League.

== Champions list ==
Qualified for the 39th National Regional Football League Competition

Region	Champions
Hokkaido	Sapporo Football Club
Tohoku	FC Ganju Iwate
Kantō	Briobecca Urayasu
Hokushinetsu	Saurcos Fukui
Tokai	FC Kariya
Kansai	Arterivo Wakayama
Chūgoku	Matsue City FC
Shikoku	F.C. Imabari
Kyushu	Nippon Steel Corp. Oita

== Hokkaido ==
Pos	Team	Pld	W	D	L	GF	GA	GD	Pts	Qualification or relegation
1	Sapporo Football Club (C, Q)	14	11	2	1	33	7	+26	35	
2	Norbritz Hokkaido	14	10	3	1	37	16	+21	33	
3	Tokachi Fairsky FC	14	10	0	4	27	14	+13	30	
4	Nippon Express FC	14	6	4	4	29	21	+8	22	
5	Sapporo GOAL PLUNDERERS	14	4	1	9	23	26	−3	13	
6	Imamizawa FC Hokushukai	14	4	1	9	30	37	−7	13	
7	Shintoku FC (R)	14	3	0	11	14	38	−24	9	Relegated
8	Nippon Steel Kamaishi (R)	14	2	1	11	14	48	−34	7	Relegated

(C) Champions; (Q) Qualified for the phase indicated; (R) Relegated

== Tohoku ==
=== Division 1 ===
Pos	Team	Pld	W	D	L	GF	GA	GD	Pts	Promotion or relegation
1	FC Ganju Iwate (C, Q)	18	15	2	1	107	11	+96	47	
2	ReinMeer Aomori FC (Q, P)	18	14	4	0	82	11	+71	46	Promoted to JFL
3	Cobaltore Onagawa	18	14	2	2	62	12	+50	44	
4	Fuji Club 2003	18	8	1	9	38	43	−5	25	
5	FC Primeiro	18	7	3	8	28	41	−13	24	
6	Morioka Zebra	18	7	3	8	39	56	−17	24	
7	Bandits Iwaki FC	18	6	2	10	27	55	−28	20	
8	Blancdieu Hirosaki FC	18	5	1	12	20	36	−16	16	
9	Iwaki Furukawa FC (R)	18	1	3	14	21	82	−61	6	Relegated to Div. 2
10	Akita FC Cambiare (R)	18	1	3	14	18	95	−77	6	Relegated to Div. 2

(C) Champions; (P) Promoted; (Q) Qualified for the phase indicated; (R) Relegated

=== Division 2 North ===
Pos	Team	Pld	W	D	L	GF	GA	GD	Pts	Promotion or relegation
1	Saruta Kōgyō S.C. [tl] (C, P)	18	12	3	3	51	24	+27	39	Promoted to Div. 1
2	FC Fuji 08	18	11	4	3	57	22	+35	37	
3	Nippon Steel Kamaishi	18	11	2	5	61	22	+39	35	
4	TDK Shinwakai	18	9	7	2	41	21	+20	34	
5	Akita University School of Medicine	18	8	4	6	39	25	+14	28	
6	Omiya Club	18	6	6	6	24	31	−7	24	
7	Mizusawa Club	18	7	2	9	35	39	−4	23	
8	Hanamaki Club	18	3	7	8	25	36	−11	16	
9	Shichinohe SC (R)	18	3	2	13	22	55	−33	11	Relegated
10	Hokuto Bank SC (R)	18	1	1	16	17	97	−80	4	Relegated

(C) Champions; (P) Promoted; (R) Relegated

=== Division 2 South ===
Pos	Team	Pld	W	D	L	GF	GA	GD	Pts	Promotion or relegation
1	Sendai Sasuke FC (C, P)	18	14	2	2	71	17	+54	44	Promoted to Div. 1
2	Marysol Matsushima SC	18	11	3	4	46	31	+15	36	
3	FC Parafrente Yonezawa	18	11	2	5	28	19	+9	35	
4	Merry FC	18	8	4	6	57	24	+33	28	
5	Duopark FC	18	7	2	9	43	54	−11	23	
6	FC Scheinen Fukushima	18	7	2	9	31	42	−11	23	
7	Sendai Nakada FC	18	7	1	10	28	48	−20	22	
8	Soma SC	18	6	3	9	24	27	−3	21	
9	Sakata Takutomo (R)	18	4	4	10	27	59	−32	16	Relegated
10	Asaka Scorpion (R)	18	3	1	14	20	54	−34	10	Relegated

(C) Champions; (P) Promoted; (R) Relegated

== Kantō ==
=== Division 1 ===
Pos	Team	Pld	W	D	L	GF	GA	GD	Pts	Promotion or relegation
1	Briobecca Urayasu (C, P)	18	13	3	2	42	13	+29	42	Promoted to JFL
2	Vonds Ichihara	18	12	2	4	35	22	+13	38	
3	Tsukuba FC	18	11	3	4	45	27	+18	36	
4	Tokyo 23 FC	18	9	5	4	40	20	+20	32	
5	FC Korea	18	10	1	7	24	26	−2	31	
6	Vertfee Takahara Nasu	18	5	5	8	26	23	+3	20	
7	Ryutsu Keizai University FC	18	5	2	11	23	33	−10	17	
8	Tonan Maebashi	18	4	4	10	14	22	−8	16	
9	Saitama SC (R)	18	4	1	13	10	41	−31	13	Relegated to Div. 2
10	Hitachi Building System (R)	18	4	0	14	15	47	−32	12	Relegated to Div. 2

(C) Champions; (P) Promoted; (R) Relegated

=== Division 2 ===
Pos	Team	Pld	W	D	L	GF	GA	GD	Pts	Promotion or relegation
1	Yokohama Takeru (C, P)	18	10	7	1	27	13	+14	37	Promoted to Div. 1
2	Aries FC Tokyo (P)	18	9	7	2	35	16	+19	34	Promoted to Div. 1
3	Waseda United	18	10	2	6	37	21	+16	32	
4	Toho Titanium SC	18	9	1	8	21	31	−10	28	
5	Kanagawa Prefecture Teachers SC	18	6	7	5	25	20	+5	25	
6	FC TIU	18	7	3	8	25	24	+1	24	
7	JMSDF Atsugi Air Base	18	7	3	8	24	23	+1	24	
8	Sakado City FC	18	5	5	8	19	29	−10	20	
9	Nippon Engineering College F. Marinos (R)	18	3	4	11	20	39	−19	13	Relegated
10	Tonan Maebashi Reserves (R)	18	2	5	11	9	26	−17	11	Relegated

(C) Champions; (P) Promoted; (R) Relegated

== Hokushinetsu ==
=== Division 1 ===
Pos	Team	Pld	W	D	L	GF	GA	GD	Pts	Qualification or relegation
1	Saurcos Fukui (C, Q)	14	12	0	2	48	5	+43	36	
2	Japan Soccer College	14	11	0	3	47	16	+31	33	
3	Artista Tomi	14	10	2	2	41	10	+31	32	
4	Toyama Shinjo Club	14	6	2	6	24	21	+3	20	
5	FC Antelope Shiojiri	14	6	1	7	23	36	−13	19	
6	FC Ueda Gentian	14	4	2	8	20	36	−16	14	
7	Valiente Toyama (R)	14	1	1	12	10	44	−34	4	Relegated to Div. 2
8	Okuetsu FC (R)	14	0	4	10	8	53	−45	4	Relegated to Div. 2

(C) Champions; (Q) Qualified for the phase indicated; (R) Relegated

=== Division 2 ===
Pos	Team	Pld	W	D	L	GF	GA	GD	Pts	Promotion or relegation
1	FC Hokuriku (C, P)	14	11	3	0	50	13	+37	36	Promoted to Div. 1
2	Sakai Phoenix (P)	14	10	1	3	30	18	+12	31	Promoted to Div. 1
3	'09 Keidai FC	14	7	3	4	33	22	+11	24	
4	Nakano Esperanza	14	4	4	6	38	31	+7	16	
5	AS Jamineiro	14	4	3	7	26	34	−8	15	
6	Teihens FC	14	4	3	7	24	46	−22	15	
7	FC Abies (R)	14	4	2	8	27	41	−14	14	Relegated
8	Fukui Teachers SC (R)	14	2	1	11	20	43	−23	7	Relegated

(C) Champions; (P) Promoted; (R) Relegated

== Tōkai ==
=== Division 1 ===
Pos	Team	Pld	W	D	L	GF	GA	GD	Pts	Qualification or relegation
1	FC Kariya (C, Q)	14	10	3	1	34	13	+21	33	
2	FC Suzuka Rampole	14	10	1	3	32	14	+18	31	
3	Fujieda City Hall SC	14	7	1	6	34	26	+8	22	
4	Chukyo University FC	14	6	2	6	25	18	+7	20	
5	FC Gifu Second	14	6	2	6	24	22	+2	20	
6	Tokoha University FC	14	5	3	6	23	26	−3	18	
7	Yazaki Valente (R)	14	3	3	8	17	29	−12	12	Relegated to Div. 2
8	Nagara Club (R)	14	1	1	12	11	50	−39	4	Relegated to Div. 2

(C) Champions; (Q) Qualified for the phase indicated; (R) Relegated

=== Division 2 ===
Pos	Team	Pld	W	D	L	GF	GA	GD	Pts	Promotion or relegation
1	Veertien Mie (C, P)	14	12	1	1	61	8	+53	37	Promoted to Div. 1
2	FC Ise-Shima (P)	14	8	5	1	45	16	+29	29	Promoted to Div. 1
3	Toyota Shukyu-dan	14	9	1	4	47	23	+24	28	
4	Toyota Industries SC	14	7	0	7	29	44	−15	21	
5	Nagoya SC	14	4	4	6	24	27	−3	16	
6	Kasugai Club	14	4	3	7	30	49	−19	15	
7	TSV1973 Yokkaichi (R)	14	1	5	8	14	35	−21	8	Relegated
8	FC Kawasaki (R)	14	0	3	11	8	56	−48	3	Relegated

(C) Champions; (P) Promoted; (R) Relegated

== Kansai ==
=== Division 1 ===
Pos	Team	Pld	W	D	L	GF	GA	GD	Pts	Qualification or relegation
1	Arterivo Wakayama (C, Q)	14	11	0	3	27	13	+14	33	
2	Banditonce Kakogawa (Q)	14	8	4	2	24	10	+14	28	
3	Amitie SC	14	9	1	4	32	23	+9	28	
4	Lagend Shiga FC	14	7	3	4	26	26	0	24	
5	Kansai FC 2008	14	5	3	6	29	26	+3	18	
6	Hannan University FC (Q)	14	5	3	6	24	23	+1	18	
7	AS Laranja Kyoto (R)	14	1	4	9	21	37	−16	7	
8	FC TIAMO Hirakata (R)	14	1	0	13	12	36	−24	3	Relegated

(C) Champions; (Q) Qualified for the phase indicated; (R) Relegated

=== Division 2 ===
Pos	Team	Pld	W	D	L	GF	GA	GD	Pts	Promotion or relegation
1	Kyoto Shiko SC (C, P)	14	8	5	1	39	14	+25	29	Promoted to Div. 1
2	Renaiss School Koga (P)	14	9	2	3	44	28	+16	29	Promoted to Div. 1
3	Ain Foods	14	9	2	3	28	25	+3	29	
4	Kwansei Gakuin University SC	14	7	1	6	30	31	−1	22	
5	Kishiwada Club	14	5	2	7	32	35	−3	17	
6	Diablossa Takada FC	14	3	3	8	13	22	−9	12	
7	Takasago Mineiro	14	2	4	8	18	31	−13	10	Relegation play-off
8	Tatsuno FC (R)	14	1	5	8	11	39	−28	8	Relegated

(C) Champions; (P) Promoted; (R) Relegated

== Chūgoku ==
Pos	Team	Pld	W	D	L	GF	GA	GD	Pts	Qualification or relegation
1	Matsue City FC (C, Q)	18	17	1	0	70	4	+66	52	
2	Dezzolla Shimane	18	13	2	3	42	18	+24	41	
3	Mitsubishi Motors Mizushima FC	18	13	1	4	38	22	+16	40	
4	SRC Hiroshima	18	10	1	7	48	34	+14	31	
5	IPU FC	18	7	1	10	32	44	−12	22	
6	NTN Okayama	18	7	1	10	28	46	−18	22	
7	Fuji Xerox Hiroshima S.C.	18	6	2	10	34	45	−11	20	
8	JX Nippon Oil & Energy Mizushima FC	18	6	0	12	26	44	−18	18	
9	Sagawa Chugoku SC (R)	18	4	1	13	20	47	−27	13	Relegated
10	SC Matsue (R)	18	2	0	16	24	58	−34	6	Relegated

(C) Champions; (Q) Qualified for the phase indicated; (R) Relegated

== Shikoku ==
Pos	Team	Pld	W	D	L	GF	GA	GD	Pts	Qualification or relegation
1	F.C. Imabari (C, Q)	14	12	1	1	58	5	+53	37	
2	Kochi University Torastar FC	14	12	1	1	63	12	+51	37	
3	Igosso Kōchi FC	14	9	3	2	55	11	+44	30	
4	R.VELHO	14	6	1	7	12	27	−15	19	
5	Tadotsu FC	14	3	4	7	19	50	−31	13	
6	Llamas Kochi FC	14	3	2	9	13	36	−23	11	
7	Nakamura Club	14	2	2	10	12	48	−36	8	Relegation play-off
8	Rossorise KFC (R)	14	2	0	12	4	47	−43	6	Relegated

(C) Champions; (Q) Qualified for the phase indicated; (R) Relegated

== Kyushu ==
Pos	Team	Pld	W	PKW	PKL	L	GF	GA	GD	Pts	Result
1	Nippon Steel Oita (C, Q)	18	15	2	0	1	51	25	+26	49	
2	Tegevajaro Miyazaki	18	11	4	0	3	47	13	+34	41	
3	J.FC Miyazaki	18	10	1	4	3	41	24	+17	36	
4	Kyushu Mitsubishi Motors	18	10	0	1	7	32	39	−7	31	
5	Mitsubishi HI Nagasaki SC	18	7	1	1	9	24	30	−6	24	
6	Kaiho Bank SC	18	5	2	3	8	36	42	−6	22	
7	FC Nakatsu	18	5	1	3	9	19	26	−7	20	
8	Kagoshima United FC Second	18	5	1	1	11	38	52	−14	18	
9	Saga LIXIL F.C.	18	5	0	1	12	20	37	−17	16	Relegation play-off
10	FC Naha (R)	18	3	1	1	13	22	45	−23	12	Relegated

(C) Champion; (Q) Qualified to the phase indicated; (R) Relegated
