= Hokushinetsu Football League =

Football league in Japan

Hokushin'etsu Football League
- Founded: 1975; 51 years ago
- Country: Japan
- Confederation: AFC
- Divisions: 2
- Number of clubs: Div 1: 8 Div 2: 8
- Level on pyramid: 5: Division 1; 6: Division 2
- Promotion to: Japan Football League
- Relegation to: Prefectural Leagues
- Domestic cup: Emperor's Cup
- Current champions: Div. 1: Toyama Shinjo; Div. 2: FC Matsucelona (2025)
- Most championships: YKK AP SC & Fukui United (11 titles)
- Website: hfl.jp
- Current: 2026 Japanese Regional Leagues

Hokushin'etsu Football League (北信越フットボールリーグ, Hokushin'etsu Futtobōru Rīgu) is a soocer league based in five prefectures in the Hokushinetsu region, which comprises Hokuriku and Shin'etsu in Japan. They are (Nagano, Niigata, Toyama, Ishikawa, and Fukui). It is a league of club teams registered in Class 1. Its name is abbreviated HFL.

== Overview ==
The Hokushi'netsu Football League, one of nine Japanese regional leagues, it began in 1975 and if the JFL is considered as the fourth tier in the league structure of Japanese football, then the Hokushin'etsu's first division is the fifth tier, and the second division is the sixth tier. In 2004, the name was changed to the current Hokushin'etsu Football League. With the addition of the top clubs from each prefecture's first division, the system became a two-division system.

The teams compete for promotion to the Japan Football League and try to avoid relegation to the Prefectural Leagues. The current champions of Division 1 and Division 2 are Toyama Shinjo Club and FC Matsucelona (ja), respectively.

As of the end of 2024 season, there two teams equal with the most championship titles in the league’s history, they are Fukui United and the now defunct YKK AP SC with eleven titles each. The league has seen a variety of champions over the years, including Nissei Plastic Industrial, Fukui Teachers, Yamaga, Niigata Eleven, Teihens, Hokuriku Electric Power, Albirex Niigata, ALO's Hokuriku, Nagano Elza, Kanazawa S.C., Matsumoto Yamaga, Nagano Parceiro, Japan Soccer College, Saurcos Fukui, and Artista Tomi.

== 2026 clubs ==
=== Division 1 ===
| Team | | Hometown | Previous Season's Position | Notes |
|---|---|---|---|---|
| 1 | Artista Asama | Tōmi, Nagano | 5th | |
| 2 | Fukui United | Fukui, Fukui | 2nd | |
| 3 | FC Hokuriku | Kanazawa, Ishikawa | 7th | |
| 4 | Japan Soccer College | Seiro, Niigata | 3rd | |
| 5 | FC Matsucelona (ja) | Matsumoto, Nagano | 1st (2nd Division) | Promoted as Division 2 champions |
| 6 | Niigata University of Health and Welfare FC (ja) | Niigata, Niigata | 4th | |
| 7 | Niigata University of Management | Kamo, Niigata | 6th | |
| 8 | Toyama Shinjo Club | Toyama, Toyama | 1st | Champions |

=== Division 2 ===
| Team | | Hometown | Previous Season's Position | Notes |
|---|---|---|---|---|
| 1 | FC Abies (ja) | Chino, Nagano | 5th | |
| 2 | Joganji Toyama | Toyama | 1st (HCL) | Promoted from Hokushin'etsu; Challenge league in 1st place |
| 3 | Kanazawa Gakuin University FC | Kanazawa, Ishikawa | 6th | |
| 4 | Libertas Chikuma (ja) | Chikuma, Nagano | 2nd (HCL) | Promoted from Hokushin'etsu; Challenge league in 2nd place |
| 5 | SR Komatsu (ja) | Komatsu, Ishikawa | 8th (Division 1) | Relegated from Division 1 |
| 6 | NUHW FC | Niigata City, Niigata | 2nd | Not promoted due to links with Niigata University of Health and Welfare FC in top division |
| 7 | N-Style Toyama (ja) | Toyama City, Toyama | 4th | |
| 8 | Sakai Phoenix (ja) | Sakai, Fukui | 3rd | |

== Hokushin'etsu Soccer League Champions ==
| Edition | Year | Winner (Division 1) |
|---|---|---|
| 1 | 1975 | YKK (1) |
| 2 | 1976 | Nissei Plastic Industrial (1) |
| 3 | 1977 | Nissei Plastic Industrial (2) |
| 4 | 1978 | Nissei Plastic Industrial (3) |
| 5 | 1979 | Nissei Plastic Industrial (4) |
| 6 | 1980 | Fukui Teachers (1) |
| 7 | 1981 | YKK (2) |
| 8 | 1982 | Nissei Plastic Industrial (5) |
| 9 | 1983 | Nissei Plastic Industrial (6) |
| 10 | 1984 | YKK (3) |
| 11 | 1985 | Yamaga (1) |
| 12 | 1986 | Niigata Eleven (1) |
| 13 | 1987 | Nissei Plastic Industrial (7) |
| 14 | 1988 | YKK (4) |
| 15 | 1989 | YKK (5) |
| 16 | 1990 | YKK (6) |
| 17 | 1991 | Teihens (1) |
| 18 | 1992 | YKK (7) |
| 19 | 1993 | YKK (8) |
| 20 | 1994 | Hokuriku Electric Power (1) |
| 21 | 1995 | YKK (9) |
| 22 | 1996 | Albirex Niigata (2) |
| 23 | 1997 | Albirex Niigata (3) |
| 24 | 1998 | ALO's Hokuriku (2) |
| 25 | 1999 | YKK (10) |
| 26 | 2000 | YKK (11) |
| 27 | 2001 | Nissei Plastic Industrial (8) |
| 28 | 2002 | Nagano Elsa (1) |
| 29 | 2003 | Japan Soccer College (1) |
| 30 | 2004 | Kanazawa S.C. (1) |
| 31 | 2005 | Nagano Elsa (2) |
| 32 | 2006 | Japan Soccer College (2) |
| 33 | 2007 | Matsumoto Yamaga (2) |
| 34 | 2008 | Nagano Parceiro (3) |
| 35 | 2009 | Japan Soccer College (3) |
| 36 | 2010 | Nagano Parceiro (4) |
| 37 | 2011 | Japan Soccer College (4) |
| 38 | 2012 | Saurcos Fukui (1) |
| 39 | 2013 | Saurcos Fukui (2) |
| 40 | 2014 | Saurcos Fukui (3) |
| 41 | 2015 | Saurcos Fukui (4) |
| 42 | 2015 | Artista Tomi (1) |
| 43 | 2017 | Saurcos Fukui (5) |
| 44 | 2018 | Saurcos Fukui (6) |
| 45 | 2019 | Fukui United (7) |
| 46 | 2020 | Fukui United (8) |
| 47 | 2021 | Fukui United (9) |
| 48 | 2022 | Artista Asama (2) |
| 49 | 2023 | Fukui United (10) |
| 50 | 2024 | Fukui United (11) |
| 51 | 2025 | Toyama Shinjo Club (1) |
| 52 | 2026 | |

| Edition | Year | Winner (Division 2) |
|---|---|---|
| 1 | 2004 | Niigata University of Management (1) |
| 2 | 2005 | Matsumoto Yamaga (1) |
| 3 | 2006 | Valiente Toyama (1) |
| 4 | 2007 | Gran Sena Niigata FC (1) |
| 5 | 2008 | FC Ueda Genshan (1) |
| 6 | 2009 | CUPS Seiro (1) |
| 7 | 2010 | Artista Togo (1) |
| 8 | 2011 | Toyama Shinjo Club (1) |
| 9 | 2012 | Valiente Toyama (2) |
| 10 | 2013 | FC Ueda Genshan (2) |
| 11 | 2014 | Okuetsu FC (1) |
| 12 | 2015 | FC Hokuriku (1) |
| 13 | 2016 | Hokuriku University Futures (1) |
| 14 | 2017 | FC Ueda Genshan (3) |
| 15 | 2018 | Hokuriku University Futures (2) |
| 16 | 2019 | Niigata University of Health and Welfare FC (1) |
| 17 | 2020 | '09 Keidai FC (1) |
| 18 | 2021 | Libertas Chikuma (1) |
| 19 | 2022 | FC Hokuriku (2) |
| 20 | 2023 | Sakai Phoenix (1) |
| 21 | 2024 | NUHW FC (1) (Note: NUHW FC is linked to Niigata University of Health and Welfare FC, currently playing in Division 1. Therefore, they could not be promoted due to tournament regulations and remained in Division 2.) |
| 22 | 2025 | FC Matsucelona (1) |
| 23 | 2026 | |
