= Mitsubishi Mizushima FC =

Japanese football club

Mizushima F.C. 三菱水島
- Full name: Mitsubishi Motors Mizushima Football Club
- Nickname: Red Adamant
- Founded: 1946; 79 years ago
- Ground: Okayama Kasaoka Athletic Stadium; Kasaoka, Okayama
- Capacity: 5,000
- Owner: Mitsubishi Motors
- Manager: Toshiya Yamashita
- League: Chugoku Soccer League
- 2024: 5th of 10
Home colours	Away colours

Mitsubishi Mizushima F.C. (三菱水島FC, Mitsubishi Mizushima Efu Shī) are a Japanese football club based in Kurashiki, Okayama. They play in the Chūgoku Soccer League.

== History ==
The club was founded in 1946 to provide recreational activities in the war-torn Mizushima area of Kurashiki city. They joined the Okayama Prefecture League in 1965 and were promoted to the Chūgoku Regional League in 1979 for the first time.

They were relegated to the Prefecture League in 1982 and stayed there for 8 years. After re-entering the Chūgoku League, they won five championships before being promoted to the JFL in 2005.

In recent years they have adopted the moniker "Red Adamant" (after their parent company Mitsubishi Motors and its former flagship football club, now known as Urawa Red Diamonds), with an aim to eventually join J. League and be a star club in their own right. A potential obstacle to this will be the newly promoted Fagiano Okayama, with whom they have had to share Momotaro Athletic Stadium in Okayama City for recent JFL fixtures.

In 2008 they finished last of eighteen but were spared the drop due to the promotion of Okayama, Kataller Toyama and Tochigi SC.

In November 2009, the club announced they would withdraw from the JFL after the end of the 2009 season because of the lack of the financial resources to operate in the league. After their membership application was refused by the Chūgoku Regional League, they decided to compete in the Okayama Prefectural League Division 1 in 2010.

In November 2016 they rebounded by winning the Shakaijin Cup, and one year later the 2017 Chūgoku Soccer League.

In 2021, they won for the 7th time the Chūgoku Soccer League, but as was the situation in 2017, they weren't able to win the promotion spot for JFL, as in both times they failed to pass through the group stage of the Japanese Regional Champions League.

== Current squad ==
As of 30 April 2024.

Note: Flags indicate national team as defined under FIFA eligibility rules; some limited exceptions apply. Players may hold more than one non-FIFA nationality.

No.	Pos.	Nation	Player
1	GK	JPN	Takeru Hanafusa
2	DF	JPN	Nagi Kishimoto
3	DF	JPN	Takuma Yasuda
4	MF	JPN	Moeto Omura
5	DF	JPN	Yuki Nagaya
6	MF	JPN	Koki Fukuda
7	MF	JPN	Kazuma Saito
8	MF	JPN	Yutaro Imai
9	MF	JPN	Noriya Okamoto
10	FW	JPN	Ryuji Miyazawa
11	FW	JPN	Shota Takase
13	DF	JPN	Soma Yamamoto

No.	Pos.	Nation	Player
14	DF	JPN	Tatsunori Maehara
16	FW	JPN	Kaito Tanaka
17	FW	JPN	Komei Ozaki
18	FW	JPN	Kenshiro Tsunashima
19	FW	JPN	Haruto Ikemoto
20	FW	JPN	Asafu Yamamura
21	MF	JPN	Tomoya Nakagawa
22	MF	JPN	Shunto Uemura
26	GK	JPN	Naoki Kitamura
30	GK	JPN	Hironori Taki
33	MF	JPN	Shinta Nagao

== League record ==
Champions	Runners-up	Third place	Promoted	Relegated

League												Emperor's Cup
Season	League	Tier	Position	P	W	D (PK W/L)	L	F	A	GD	Pts	Emperor's Cup
2000	Chugoku Soccer; League	4	2nd	14	8	(3/1)	2	46	20	26	31	
2001	Chugoku Soccer; League	4	2nd	12	7	(-/1)	4	24	12	12	22	
2002	Chugoku Soccer; League	4	1st	10	9	(1/-)	0	37	9	28	29	
2003	Chugoku Soccer; League	4	1st	14	12	(-/1)	1	34	7	27	37	
2004	Chugoku Soccer; League	4	1st	14	13	(1/-)	0	40	6	34	41	
2005	Japan Football; League	3	16th	30	2	2	26	24	85	-61	8	3rd round
2006	Japan Football; League	3	17th	34	7	6	21	32	74	-42	27	3rd round
2007	Japan Football; League	3	15th	34	11	2	21	36	53	-17	35	2nd round
2008	Japan Football; League	3	18th	34	3	7	24	30	76	-46	16	Did not qualify
2009	Japan Football; League	3	18th	34	4	6	24	28	69	-41	18	1st round
2010	Okayama Prefectural League	5	1st	12	11	1	0				34	Did not qualify
2011	Chugoku Soccer; League	4	4th	18	12	1	5	47	33	14	37	Did not qualify
2012	Chugoku Soccer; League	4	5th	18	7	5	6	45	43	2	26	Did not qualify
2013	Chugoku Soccer; League	4	7th	18	4	5	9	26	37	-11	17	Did not qualify
2014	Chugoku Soccer; League	5	3rd	18	10	3	5	41	23	18	33	Did not qualify
2015	Chugoku Soccer; League	5	3rd	18	13	1	4	38	22	16	40	Did not qualify
2016	Chugoku Soccer; League	5	3rd	18	10	2	6	49	25	24	32	Did not qualify
2017	Chugoku Soccer; League	5	1st	18	15	1	2	47	18	29	46	1st round
2018	Chugoku Soccer; League	5	2nd	18	10	2	6	46	25	21	32	1st round
2019	Chugoku Soccer; League	5	2nd	18	15	2	1	60	13	47	47	Did not qualify
2020	Chugoku Soccer; League	5	Cancelled									3rd round
2021	Chugoku Soccer; League	5	1st	18	11	3	2	42	10	32	36	2nd round
2022	Chugoku Soccer; League	5	5th	18	7	7	4	41	16	25	28	Did not qualify
2023	Chugoku Soccer; League	5	5th	18	10	2	6	30	15	15	32	Did not qualify
2024	Chugoku Soccer; League	5	5th	18	9	3	6	29	18	11	30	1st round
2025	Chugoku Soccer; League	5	TBA	18								TBA

Key

- Tier'. = Level in Japanese soccer structure; P = Games played; W = Games won; D = Games drawn; L = Games lost; F = Goals for; A = Goals against; GD = Goals difference; Pts = Points won

== Honours ==
Mitsubishi Mizushima honours
Honour	No.	Years
Okayama Prefectural Football Championship Emperor's Cup Okayama Prefectural Qualifiers	19	1985, 1986, 1988, 1991, 1996, 1997, 1998, 1999, 2004, 2005, 2006, 2007, 2009, 2017, 2018, 2020, 2021, 2023, 2024
Chugoku Soccer League	7	1992, 1999, 2002, 2003, 2004, 2017, 2021
Okayama Prefectural League	1	2010
Shakaijin Cup	1	2016
