= 2018 Japanese Regional Leagues =

Japanese amateur leagues football season

Japanese Regional Leagues
- Season: 2018
- Promoted: Suzuka Unlimited; Matsue City

The 2018 Japanese Regional Leagues were a competition between parallel association football leagues ranking at the fifth and sixth tiers of the Japan Football League.

Statistics of Japanese Regional Leagues for the 2018 season.

== Champions list ==
Region	Champions
Hokkaido	Hokkaido Tokachi Sky Earth
Tohoku	Blancdieu Hirosaki FC
Kanto	Tochigi Uva
Hokushinetsu	Saurcos Fukui
Tokai	Suzuka Unlimited
Kansai	Banditonce Kakogawa
Chūgoku	Matsue City
Shikoku	Kochi United SC
Kyushu	J.FC Miyazaki

== League standings ==
=== Hokkaido ===
Pos	Team	Pld	W	D	L	GF	GA	GD	Pts	Qualification or relegation
1	Hokkaido Tokachi Sky Earth (C, Q)	14	13	0	1	64	10	+54	39	Regional Champions League
2	Norbritz Hokkaido	14	12	0	2	67	12	+55	36	
3	Sapporo Shukyu-Dan	14	9	0	5	57	14	+43	27	
4	Nippon Steel Muroran SC	14	6	2	6	19	29	−10	20	
5	Iwamizawa FC Hokusyukai	14	5	1	8	31	69	−38	16	
6	Toyota Motors Hokkaido SC	14	4	1	9	17	45	−28	13	
7	Sapporo University Goal Plunderers (R)	14	4	0	10	22	44	−22	12	Relegated to Sapporo Prefectural League
8	Verdelazzo Asahikawa (R)	14	1	0	13	16	70	−54	3	Relegated to Sapporo Prefectural League

Source: rsssf.com
Rules for classification: 1) Points; 2) Goal difference; 3) Goals scored
(C) Champions; (Q) Qualified for the phase indicated; (R) Relegated

=== Tohoku ===
Division 1
Pos	Team	Pld	W	D	L	GF	GA	GD	Pts	Qualification
1	Blancdieu Hirosaki FC (C, Q)	18	17	1	0	81	12	+69	52	Qualified for the Regional Champions League
2	FC Ganju Iwate	18	11	3	4	71	29	+42	36	
3	Morioka Zebra	18	11	2	5	44	30	+14	35	
4	Fuji Club 2003	18	9	4	5	36	22	+14	31	
5	Nippon Steel Kamaishi SC	18	9	3	6	40	29	+11	30	
6	FC Primeiro	18	7	2	9	34	38	−4	23	
7	Akita FC Cambiare	18	7	1	10	24	36	−12	22	
8	Merry SC (R)	18	4	4	10	18	57	−39	16	Relegated to Tohoku Division 2
9	Bandits Iwaki (R)	18	5	0	13	24	60	−36	15	Relegated to Tohoku Division 2
10	Iwaki Furukawa FC (R)	18	0	0	18	14	73	−59	0	Relegated to Tohoku Division 2

Source: rsssf.com
(C) Champions; (Q) Qualified for the phase indicated; (R) Relegated

Division 2 North
Pos	Team	Pld	W	D	L	GF	GA	GD	Pts	Qualification
1	Saruta Kōgyō S.C. [tl] (P)	18	15	2	1	88	13	+75	47	Promoted to Division 1
2	Omiya SC	18	15	2	1	64	21	+43	47	
3	Akita University Medical FC	18	12	1	5	53	19	+34	37	
4	Hokuto Bank SC	18	9	1	8	39	48	−9	28	
5	Mizusawa SC	18	6	5	7	35	30	+5	23	
6	TDK Shinwakai	18	6	3	9	36	35	+1	21	
7	NuPere Hiraizumi Maesawa	18	5	3	10	25	43	−18	18	
8	Gonohe SC	18	3	4	11	27	66	−39	13	
9	Oirase FC (R)	18	2	6	10	25	79	−54	12	Relegated to Prefectural league
10	Tono Club (R)	18	2	3	13	21	59	−38	9	Relegated to Prefectural league

Source: rsssf.com
(P) Promoted to Division 1; (R) Relegated

Division 2 South
Pos	Team	Pld	W	D	L	GF	GA	GD	Pts	Qualification
1	Iwaki FC (P)	18	18	0	0	139	12	+127	54	Promoted to Division 1
2	FC Sendai University	17	15	0	2	75	16	+59	45	
3	Sendai Sasuke FC	18	9	1	8	48	38	+10	28	
4	Ricoh Industry Tohoku	18	9	1	8	29	43	−14	28	
5	Oyama SC	18	8	2	8	60	59	+1	26	
6	FC Parafrente Yonezawa (R)	18	7	2	9	32	56	−24	23	Relegated to Prefectural League
7	Aizu Olympus (R)	18	6	2	10	24	52	−28	20	Relegated to Prefectural League
8	Sendai Nakata SC (R)	18	5	1	12	22	65	−43	16	Relegated to Prefectural League
9	Soma SC (R)	18	3	4	11	19	43	−24	13	Relegated to Prefectural League
10	Nakaniida SC (R)	17	2	1	14	21	85	−64	7	Relegated to Prefectural League

Source: rsssf.com
(P) Promoted to Division 1; (R) Relegated

=== Kantō ===
Division 1
Pos	Team	Pld	W	D	L	GF	GA	GD	Pts
1	Tochigi Uva FC	18	17	1	0	55	14	+41	52
2	Vonds Ichihara	18	12	2	4	48	20	+28	38
3	Tokyo United FC	18	8	6	4	37	26	+11	30
4	Tokyo 23 FC	18	6	7	5	23	21	+2	25
5	Ryutsu Keizai University FC	18	7	3	8	40	39	+1	24
6	Briobecca Urayasu	18	7	3	8	25	28	−3	24
7	Joyful Honda Tsukuba FC	18	6	4	8	32	37	−5	22
8	Yokohama Takeru FC	18	2	7	9	17	41	−24	13
9	Vertfee Takahara Nasu	18	3	3	12	17	33	−16	12
10	Saitama SC	18	2	4	12	13	48	−35	10

Source: rsssf.com

Division 2
Pos	Team	Pld	W	D	L	GF	GA	GD	Pts
1	Toin University of Yokohama SC	18	11	4	3	38	20	+18	37
2	Hitachi Building Systems SC	18	10	4	4	31	16	+15	34
3	Tonan Maebashi	18	8	7	3	27	13	+14	31
4	Identy Mirai	18	6	7	5	30	25	+5	25
5	Tokyo International University SC	18	6	6	6	23	22	+1	24
6	Esperanza SC	18	6	4	8	30	22	+8	22
7	Kanagawa Teachers SC	18	5	5	8	24	34	−10	20
8	Waseda United	18	5	3	10	21	44	−23	18
9	Yokohama GSFC Cobra	18	3	8	7	28	34	−6	17
10	Aries Tokyo	18	3	6	9	18	39	−21	15

Source: rsssf.com

=== Hokushinetsu ===
Division 1
Pos	Team	Pld	W	D	L	GF	GA	GD	Pts
1	Saurcos Fukui	14	12	2	0	61	8	+53	38
2	Artista Asama	14	11	2	1	50	11	+39	35
3	Japan Soccer College	14	7	2	5	31	19	+12	23
4	Sakai Phoenix	14	4	5	5	22	27	−5	17
5	FC Hokuriku	14	4	3	7	15	19	−4	15
6	Toyama Shinjo Club	14	4	2	8	13	38	−25	14
7	09 Keidai FC	14	3	2	9	10	25	−15	11
8	FC Ueda Gientian	14	2	0	12	12	67	−55	6

Source: rsssf.com

Division 2
Pos	Team	Pld	W	D	L	GF	GA	GD	Pts
1	Hokuriku University Futures	14	14	0	0	44	9	+35	42
2	05 Kamo FC	14	7	3	4	30	19	+11	24
3	Nagaoka Billboard FC	14	5	5	4	29	28	+1	20
4	FC Antelope Shiojiri	14	5	4	5	22	23	−1	19
5	Cups Seiro	14	5	1	8	32	23	+9	16
6	Ono FC	14	3	5	6	15	25	−10	14
7	Nakano Esperanza	14	3	2	9	25	37	−12	11
8	Artista Grande	14	3	2	9	18	51	−33	11

Source: rsssf.com

=== Tōkai ===
Division 1
Pos	Team	Pld	W	D	L	GF	GA	GD	Pts
1	Suzuka Unlimited	14	12	1	1	37	6	+31	37
2	FC Kariya	14	12	1	1	33	9	+24	37
3	Yazaki Valente	14	6	2	6	21	21	0	20
4	FC Ise-Shima	14	6	1	7	21	30	−9	19
5	Tokai Gakuen FC	14	5	2	7	26	32	−6	17
6	Fujieda City Hall SC	14	4	2	8	21	24	−3	14
7	Toyota Shukyu-Dan	14	2	3	9	16	38	−22	9
8	Chukyo University FC	14	2	2	10	11	26	−15	8

Source: rsssf.com

Division 2
Pos	Team	Pld	W	D	L	GF	GA	GD	Pts
1	FC Gifu Second	14	10	2	2	36	19	+17	32
2	Chukyo University FC B	14	9	3	2	40	21	+19	30
3	Rivielta Toyokawa	14	7	3	4	29	27	+2	24
4	Nagoya SC	14	7	2	5	22	16	+6	23
5	Tokoha University HamamatsuFC	14	5	6	3	28	14	+14	21
6	Toyota Industries SC	14	3	4	7	23	32	−9	13
7	Nagara Club	14	3	0	11	10	26	−16	9
8	FC Goal	14	1	2	11	11	44	−33	5

Source: rsssf.com

=== Kansai ===
Division 1
Pos	Team	Pld	W	D	L	GF	GA	GD	Pts
1	Banditonce Kakogawa	14	10	3	1	27	9	+18	33
2	Ococias Kyoto AC	14	10	1	3	36	16	+20	31
3	Hannan University FC	14	7	1	6	35	25	+10	22
4	FC TIAMO Hirakata	14	6	3	5	26	22	+4	21
5	Arterivo Wakayama	14	6	2	6	22	24	−2	20
6	Kandai FC 2008	14	4	3	7	10	26	−16	15
7	Takasago Mineiro FC	14	4	2	8	16	22	−6	14
8	AS Laranja Kyoto	14	1	1	12	9	37	−28	4

Source: rsssf.com

Division 2
Pos	Team	Pld	W	D	L	GF	GA	GD	Pts
1	St.Andrew's FC	14	10	2	2	40	12	+28	32
2	Lagend Shiga FC	14	9	3	2	26	13	+13	30
3	Porvenir Kashihara	14	7	4	3	37	15	+22	25
4	Kyoto Shiko Club	14	6	3	5	26	20	+6	21
5	Kandai Club 2010	14	6	3	5	27	24	+3	21
6	FC EASY 02 Akashi	14	6	1	7	17	25	−8	19
7	Renaiss Gakuen Koka SC	14	2	1	11	15	44	−29	7
8	Ain Foods SC	14	1	1	12	12	47	−35	4

Source: rsssf.com

=== Chūgoku ===
Pos	Team	Pld	W	D	L	GF	GA	GD	Pts
1	Matsue City	18	18	0	0	76	4	+72	54
2	Mitsubishi Mizushima FC	18	10	2	6	46	25	+21	32
3	SRC Hiroshima	18	10	2	6	36	24	+12	32
4	International Pacific University SC	18	9	3	6	36	23	+13	30
5	JXTG Energy Mizushima	18	9	2	7	42	38	+4	29
6	Harada Kogyo FC	18	6	2	10	27	45	−18	20
7	Fuji Xerox Hiroshima SC	18	5	3	10	18	43	−25	18
8	Hatsukaichi FC	18	5	2	11	25	44	−19	17
9	NTN Okayama	18	4	2	12	19	48	−29	14
10	Dezzolla Shimane	18	3	4	11	21	52	−31	13

Source: rsssf.com

=== Shikoku ===
Pos	Team	Pld	W	D	L	GF	GA	GD	Pts
1	Kochi United SC	14	12	1	1	80	6	+74	37
2	FC Tokushima	14	10	3	1	55	11	+44	33
3	KUFC Nankoku	14	10	1	3	48	14	+34	31
4	Tadotsu FC	14	7	2	5	26	28	−2	23
5	R.Velho Takamatsu	13	3	2	8	22	41	−19	11
6	Llamas Kochi FC	13	2	4	7	11	34	−23	10
7	Niisho Club	14	2	2	10	18	54	−36	8
8	Koyo Sealing Techno SC	14	1	1	12	8	84	−76	4

Source: rsssf.com

=== Kyushu ===
Pos	Team	Pld	W	PKW	PKL	L	GF	GA	GD	Pts
1	J.FC Miyazaki	18	16	0	1	1	56	13	+43	49
2	Okinawa SV	18	16	0	0	2	74	12	+62	48
3	NIFS Kanoya FC	18	11	1	1	5	35	27	+8	36
4	Kumamoto Teachers SC	18	8	0	2	8	23	31	−8	26
5	Nippon Steel Oita SC	18	7	0	3	8	27	31	−4	24
6	Kaiho Bank SC	18	5	3	2	8	26	41	−15	23
7	Saga Lixil FC	18	5	2	3	8	27	29	−2	22
8	Kawasoe Club	18	5	1	2	10	19	39	−20	19
9	Kyushu Mitsubishi Motors SC	18	1	5	0	12	15	46	−31	13
10	FC Nakatsu	18	0	4	2	12	7	40	−33	10

Source: rsssf.com
