= SRC Hiroshima =

Japanese football club

SRC Hiroshima SRC広島
- Full name: Soccer Representative Club Hiroshima
- Nickname: SRC
- Founded: 1953; 72 years ago
- Stadium: Ueno Comprehensive Park Athletics Field; Shōbara, Hiroshima
- Capacity: 1,000
- Chairman: Seiji Moriwaki
- Manager: Masahisa Hirota
- League: Chūgoku Soccer League
- 2025: 7th of 10
- Website: src-hiroshima.com
Home colours	Away colours

Soccer Representative Club Hiroshima (サッカー代表クラブ広島, Sakkā Daihyō Kurabu Hiroshima) commonly known as SRC Hiroshima (SRC広島, Esu Eru Shi Hiroshima) is a football (soccer) club based in Hiroshima, which is located in Hiroshima Prefecture in Japan. They play in the Chūgoku Soccer League, which is part of Japanese Regional Leagues.

== History ==
The club was founded in 1953 as a teachers' association club (similar to Tochigi S.C., Gainare Tottori and Renofa Yamaguchi). SRC Hiroshima has been a key-member of Chugoku Soccer League, since they've been a part of this regional league from 1973. They have been relegated to Hiroshima Prefectural League three times, but they have also been promoted back as many times to play again in the actual 5th level of Japanese football. They featured four times in the Emperor's Cup: first in 1996, then again in 2014, 2016 and mostly 2017, when SRC reached 2nd round. In 2016, SRC Hiroshima also won Chugoku Soccer League for the first time. In 2019, they won it for the second time. In 2020, they played an alternative championship (CSL Championship) following the cancelation of the 2020 Japanese Regional Leagues, in which they were crowned with the title after beating Baleine Shimonoseki by the score of 2–0 in the final.

== League record ==
Champions	Runners-up	Third place	Promoted	Relegated

League											Emperor's Cup
Season	Division	Pos.	P	W	D	L	F	A	GD	Pts	Emperor's Cup
2013	Chūgoku Soccer; League	9th	18	4	4	10	25	64	-39	16	
2014	Chūgoku Soccer; League	4th	18	9	5	4	68	35	33	32	
2015	Chūgoku Soccer; League	4th	18	10	1	7	48	34	14	31	
2016	Chūgoku Soccer; League	1st	18	12	5	1	54	15	39	41	
2017	Chūgoku Soccer; League	3rd	18	11	2	5	51	34	17	35	
2018	Chūgoku Soccer; League	3rd	18	10	2	6	36	24	12	32	
2019	Chūgoku Soccer; League	1st	18	15	2	1	61	12	49	47	
2020	Chūgoku Soccer; League	Cancelled									
2021	Chūgoku Soccer; League	6th	16	6	2	8	27	24	3	20	
2022	Chūgoku Soccer; League	4th	18	8	6	4	43	20	23	30	
2023	Chūgoku Soccer; League	2nd	18	13	1	4	55	18	37	40	1st round
2024	Chūgoku Soccer; League	2nd	18	11	4	3	35	14	21	37	
2025	Chūgoku Soccer; League	7th	18	7	2	9	24	26	-2	23	
2026/27	Chūgoku Soccer; League	TBD	18								

Key

- Pos. = Position in league; P = Games played; W = Games won; D = Games drawn; L = Games lost; F = Goals scored; A = Goals conceded; GD = Goals difference; Pts = Points gained

== Honours ==
SRC Hiroshima honours
Honour	No.	Years
All Hiroshima Football Championship Emperor's Cup Hiroshima Prefectural Qualifiers	7	1996, 2014, 2016, 2017, 2018, 2019, 2023
Chūgoku Soccer League	2	2016, 2019
Chūgoku Soccer League Championship	1	2020

== Current squad ==
As of 23 August 2023.

Note: Flags indicate national team as defined under FIFA eligibility rules; some limited exceptions apply. Players may hold more than one non-FIFA nationality.

No.	Pos.	Nation	Player
1	GK	JPN	Masaaki Nakamoto
2	DF	JPN	Kyohei Tsunemori
3	DF	JPN	Sora Yamaguchi
5	DF	JPN	Ryota Yoshiura
6	DF	JPN	Kishi Tsubone
7	MF	JPN	Tsubasa Maehara
9	MF	JPN	Haruka Hayashi
10	MF	JPN	Sho Sumihiro
11	FW	JPN	Kotetsu Sato
13	FW	NGA	Jerome Abah
14	MF	JPN	Shota Yokoro
15	DF	JPN	Yuya Kawai
16	FW	JPN	Takumi Niino
17	MF	JPN	Yo Numamoto
19	FW	JPN	Tatsuya Kawakami

No.	Pos.	Nation	Player
20	MF	JPN	Hokuto Yamada
21	MF	JPN	Kota Ishihara
22	DF	JPN	Shohei Sakuka
23	GK	JPN	Masaharu Hatano
24	MF	JPN	Taiki Shimizu
25	DF	JPN	Yuki Wakatomo
26	DF	JPN	Kodai Akiyama
28	MF	JPN	Takumi Handa
29	DF	JPN	Takuya Kinoshita
30	DF	JPN	Keisho Iguchi
31	GK	JPN	Kairi Hamano
33	DF	JPN	Masatoshi Yasui
34	MF	JPN	Shoma Hirao
40	GK	JPN	Go Aihara
