= Blancdieu Hirosaki FC =

Japanese football club

Blancdieu Hirosaki FC ブランデュー弘前FC
- Full name: Blancdieu Hirosaki Football Club
- Nickname: The Blanc Dew
- Founded: 2012; 13 years ago
- Ground: Hirosaki Sports Park, Hirosaki, Aomori
- Manager: Fujio Yamamoto
- League: Tohoku Soccer League (Div. 1)
- 2024: 1st of 10 (champions)
- Website: blancdieu-hirosaki.com
Home colours	Away colours

Blancdieu Hirosaki FC (ブランデュー弘前FC, Burande~yū Hirosaki Efu Shi) is a football club team based in Hirosaki, Aomori. They currently play in Tohoku Soccer League, which part of Japanese Regional Leagues. It was founded in 2012 and aims to be a future J. League member.

== Name origin ==
Blancdieu is a coined word of blanc (white in French) and Dieu (God in French) and has the meaning of the white God of the Shirakami-Sanchi Mountains.

== History ==
Established in 2012, the team clinched the Aomori Prefecture Adult Soccer League Division 1 title that year. In 2013, they earned promotion to the Tohoku Adult Soccer League Division 2 North, finishing as runners-up. The subsequent season saw them win Division 2 North, ascending to the top division for the 2015 season. They achieved their first Tohoku League Division 1 victory in 2018 as a team from Aomori Prefecture and took part in the All-Japan Regional Football Champions League 2018, only to be ousted in the initial round. Despite finishing second in the league in 2019, they entered the regional Champions League under tournament rules but faced elimination in the first round. They reclaimed the league title in 2020 but were again eliminated early in the Regional Champions League, marking their third consecutive first-round exit. The 2020 season saw Brandu Hirosaki Co., Ltd., established in October 2019, take over as the operating company. In 2023, they secured the league title once more since their last win in 2020, qualifying for the Champions League, yet they were eliminated in the first round after two draws and one loss. In 2024, they defended their league championship title with an undefeated season, boasting seventeen victories and a single draw. However, their journey in the Regional Champions League concluded with three losses in Group B, resulting in a last-place finish.

== Stadium ==
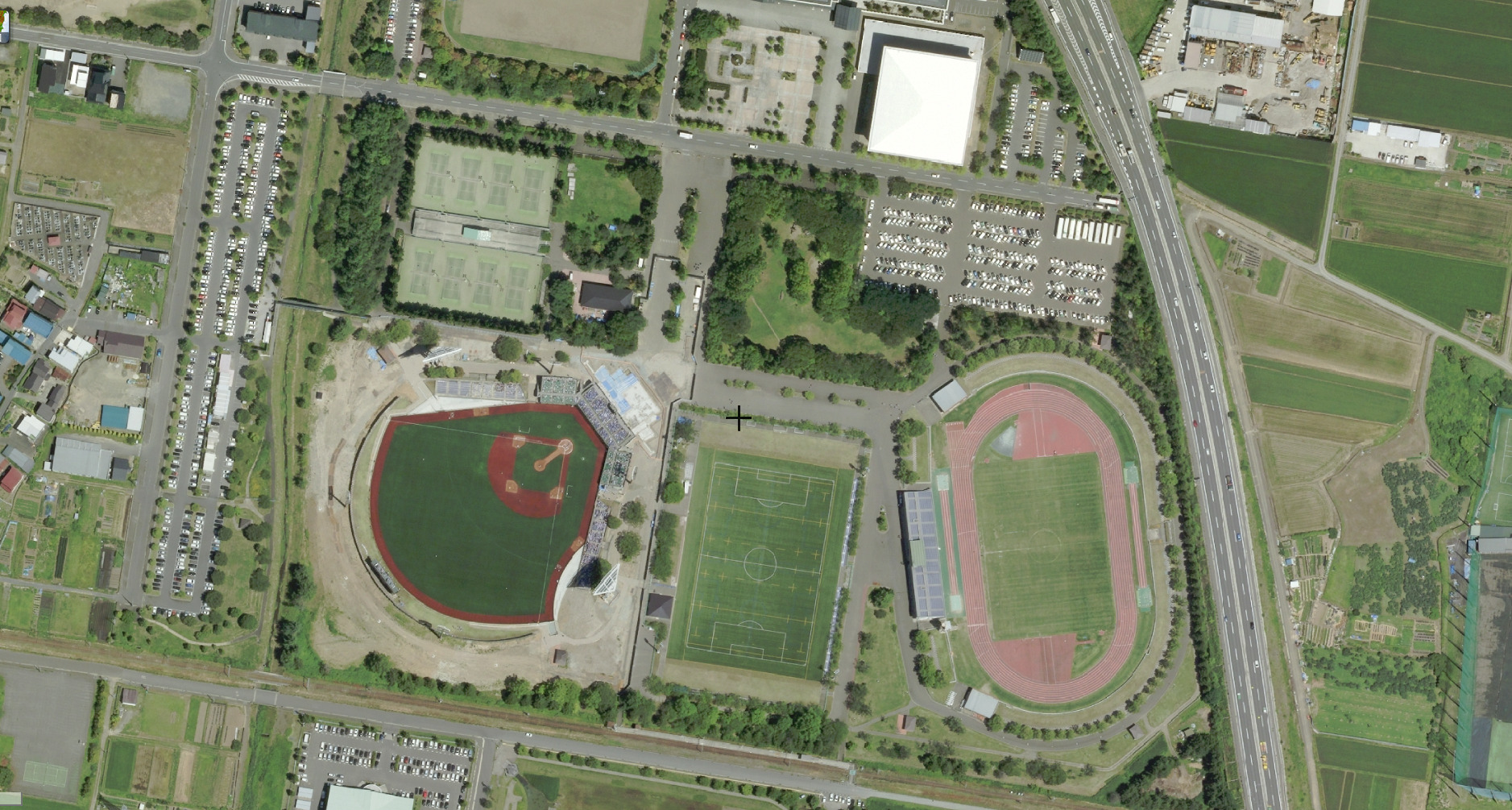
Hirosaki Sports Park

== Current squad ==
Updated to 23 August 2023. Note: Flags indicate national team as defined under FIFA eligibility rules; some limited exceptions apply. Players may hold more than one non-FIFA nationality.

No.	Pos.	Nation	Player
1	GK	JPN	Takuya Kawano
4	DF	JPN	Tatsuya Kawasaki
5	DF	JPN	Kaito Sakaki
6	DF	JPN	Shunya Miyasaka
7	MF	JPN	Ryuya Odagiri
8	MF	JPN	Taiga Hirao
9	MF	JPN	Soichiro Hatta
10	MF	JPN	Kodai Asari
11	FW	JPN	Teruyuki Takagi
13	DF	JPN	Ryosuke Narita
14	MF	JPN	Kota Maguchi
15	FW	JPN	Takunosuke Funakawa

No.	Pos.	Nation	Player
16	FW	JPN	Sho Aogaki
17	DF	JPN	Shuto Masuda
18	MF	JPN	Yoshifumi Iwai
19	DF	JPN	Yuma Takahashi
20	MF	JPN	Kota Itabashi
21	MF	JPN	Naoya Nemoto
22	MF	JPN	Kohei Shigeta
23	GK	JPN	Takumu Yano
26	GK	JPN	Naoki Tamura
27	DF	JPN	Ryoga Inoue
31	GK	JPN	Hajime Sakai
33	MF	JPN	Haruki Ono

== League and cup record ==
Champions	Runners-up	Third place	Promoted	Relegated

League													Emperor's Cup	Shakaijin Cup
Season	League	Tier	Teams	Pos.	P	W	D	L	F	A	GD	Pts	Emperor's Cup	Shakaijin Cup
2012	Aomori Prefecture; First Division	7		1st	7	5	2	0	23	8	15	17	Did not qualify	
2013	Tohoku Soccer League (Div. 2, North)	6	10	2nd	18	12	2	4	34	17	17	38	Did not qualify	
2014	Tohoku Soccer League (Div. 2, North)	6	10	1st	18	16	2	0	64	10	54	50	Did not qualify	
2015	Tohoku Soccer League (Div. 1)	5	10	8th	18	5	1	12	20	36	−16	16	Did not qualify	
2016	Tohoku Soccer League (Div. 1)	5	10	2nd	18	10	4	4	34	23	11	34	Did not qualify	
2017	Tohoku Soccer League (Div. 1)	5	10	3rd	18	11	3	4	35	20	15	36	Did not qualify	
2018	Tohoku Soccer League (Div. 1)	5	10	1st	18	17	1	0	81	12	69	52	Did not qualify	
2019	Tohoku Soccer League (Div. 1)	5	10	2nd	18	13	4	1	82	14	68	43	Did not qualify	
2020 †	Tohoku Soccer League (Div. 1)	5	10	1st	9	8	1	0	48	4	44	25	Did not qualify	‡
2021 †	Tohoku Soccer League (Div. 1)	5	12	2nd	8	7	0	1	29	3	26	22	Did not qualify	‡
2022	Tohoku Soccer League (Div. 1)	5	12	2nd	16	12	2	2	73	10	63	38	Did not qualify	
2023	Tohoku Soccer League (Div. 1)	5	12	1st	18	16	1	1	92	8	84	49	Did not qualify	
2024	Tohoku Soccer League (Div. 1)	5	10	1st	18	17	1	0	98	13	85	52	Did not qualify	Quarter-finals
2025	Tohoku Soccer League (Div. 1)	5	10	2nd	18	14	0	4	46	17	29	42	Did not qualify	
2026	Tohoku Soccer League (Div. 1)	5	10	TBD	18								Did not qualify	TBD

Key

- Pos. = Position in league; P = Games played; W = Games won; D = Games drawn; L = Games lost; F = Goals scored; A = Goals conceded; GD = Goals difference; Pts = Points gained
- † Number of games played reduced by COVID-19 worldwide pandemic
- ‡ Competition cancelled due to COVID-19 pandemic in Japan

Blancdieu Hirosaki FC honours
Honour	No.	Years
Aomori Prefecture First Division	1	2012
Tohoku Soccer League Division 2 North	1	2014
Tohoku Soccer League Division 1	4	2018, 2020, 2023, 2024
