= Hokkaido Tokachi Sky Earth =

Japanese football club

Hokkaido Tokachi Sky Earth 北海道十勝スカイアース
- Full name: Hokkaido Tokachi Sky Earth
- Founded: 1995; 31 years ago
- Ground: Obihiro Forest Athletic Field; Obihiro, Hokkaido
- Capacity: 8,400
- Chairman: Soichiro Kanazawa
- Manager: Yoshihiro Yatsugawa
- League: Hokkaido Soccer League
- 2024: Champions
- Website: hokkaido-tokachi-skyearth.jp
Home colours	Away colours

Hokkaido Tokachi Sky Earth (北海道十勝スカイアース, Hokkaidō Tokachi Sukaiāsu) is a football (soccer) club based in Obihiro, which is located in Hokkaido in Japan. They play in the Hokkaido Soccer League, which is part of Japanese Regional Leagues.

== History ==
Born in 1995 as Rude Boys, the club rapidly found promotions from Obihiro League to Prefectural Leagues. In 2006, a new name was established with Fair Sky FC, which was also promoted for the first time in the Hokkaido Soccer League. The name of the club did not stay the same; it became the Tokachi Fairsky FC in 2014, after Obihiro's pre-1871 home province, and Tokachi FC in 2017.

In 2005, the team won the Eastern Doto Block League and the Block League final tournament, which led to their promotion to the Hokkaido Soccer League. The following year, the club changed its name to Tokachi Fair Sky FC, which means “clear sky” in English and reflects the idea of “Tokachi sunny and fair, the sky that can be shared by the Tokachi football family”. In 2007, the name was changed to Tokachi Fair Sky Genesis under the sponsorship of “Genesis Co., Ltd.” but was relegated to the Doto Block League after finishing seventh in the Hokkaido League.

In 2008, they won the Eastern Doto Block League championship battling against Marseise FC until the final match and advanced to the Block League finals. However, they lost all three matches and finished in fourth place. In 2013, they participated in the All-Japan Adult Football Championship for the first time but lost to FC Korea in the first round. They also finished third in the Hokkaido Block League and did not return to the Hokkaido League.

In 2010, they changed their name back to Tokachi Fair Sky Genesis. They won the Doto Block League undefeated, finished first in the Block League Final Tournament, and returned to the Hokkaido Soccer League for the first time in four years.

In 2014, Genesis withdrew from its main sponsorship, so the club's name was changed back to Tokachi Fair Sky FC. In their first appearance at the 38th All Japan Regional Soccer League Final Tournament after winning their first Hokkaido League title, they were eliminated in the first round with three losses and no goals scored. They also represented Hokkaido at the fourth National Sports Festival. It was a historic moment for a Tokachi team to advance to a national sport.

In January 2016, Tokachi Fair Sky Hokkaido Sports Club was established as a general incorporated association, Tokachi Fair Sky Sports Club, which became the operating organisation. In 2017, the general incorporated association Tokachi Fair Sky Hokkaido Sports Club was dissolved, and the club's name was changed to Tokachi FC. In May, the company announced the signing of an operating agreement with Leaflass, the largest sports school for children in Japan. They announced that they will build a support system for the government and the region and promote an environment that meets the requirements for promotion to the JFL and entry of the J. League21. Former Verdy Kawasaki goalkeeper and Leaflass managing director Takayuki Fujikawa was appointed as the representative, and former Japan national team forward Shoji Shiro was appointed as the supervisor. In September, they represented Hokkaido at the 14th National Sports Festival and won the Hokkaido League championship for the second time in three years. In November, a new management organisation, Hokkaido Tokachi Sky Earth Sports Co., Ltd., was established.

From 2018, the club's name was changed to Hokkaido Tokachi Sky Earth. In September, they won their second consecutive Hokkaido League title and participated in the All-Japan Regional Football Champions League 9 for the third time. They won for the first time in the history of the tournament but were eliminated in the first round in third place (two wins and three losses) in Group A. In November, representative Takayuki Fujikawa died of stomach cancer.

In 2019, Soichiro Kanazawa became the representative as a replacement for Fujikawa, who died in November of the previous year1, and supervisor Shoji Shiro became the general manager. They won their third consecutive Hokkaido League title and participated in the Regional Champions League for the fourth time but were eliminated in the first round after finishing fourth in Group B (losing all three matches).

In 2020, they won their fourth consecutive Hokkaido League title and participated in the Regional Champions League for the fourth consecutive year and fifth time overall. In the first round, they finished second in their group with two wins and a defeat and advanced to the final round for the first time, but in the final round they lost all three matches and finished in fourth place.

In 2021, after five games, the league was cancelled due to the coronavirus pandemic. They participated in the regional Champions League because they were in first place at that time but were eliminated in the first round after finishing third in Group C (two draws and one defeat). In the Governor's Cup All Roads Soccer Championship (Emperor's Cup Hokkaido Qualifier) They beat Norblitz Hokkaido FC and participated in the Emperor's Cup for the first time in the club's history. In the first round they played J2 League Blaublitz Akita and won the match after a penalty shootout thus winning an Emperor's Cup match for the first time. They lost to Jubilo Iwata in the next round and was eliminated from the tournament.

In 2022, they finished second in the Hokkaido League after losing one, drawing one and one loss to BTOP Thank Kuriyama and Norblitz Hokkaido FC, missing out on the regional CL for the first time in six years.

== League record ==
Champions	Runners-up	Third place	Promoted	Relegated

League											Emperor's Cup	Shakaijin Cup
Season	League	Position	P	W	D	L	F	A	GD	Pts	Emperor's Cup	Shakaijin Cup
as Tokachi Fair Sky FC
2006	Hokkaido Soccer League	6th	14	4	4	6	15	22	-7	16		
2007	Hokkaido Soccer League	7th	14	4	1	9	25	39	-14	13		
2008	Hokkaido Block League	1st	10	9	0	1	41	11	30	27		
2009	Hokkaido Block League	3rd	10	5	3	2	34	15	19	18		
as Tokachi Fair Sky Genesis
2010	Hokkaido Block League	1st	10	8	2	0	54	10	44	26		
2011	Hokkaido Soccer League	3rd	14	7	2	5	42	29	13	23	Did not qualify	
2012	Hokkaido Soccer League	2nd	14	11	0	3	46	22	24	33	Did not qualify	
2013	Hokkaido Soccer League	2nd	14	10	2	2	44	16	28	32	Did not qualify	
as Tokachi Fair Sky
2014	Hokkaido Soccer League	1st	14	12	1	1	47	16	31	37	Did not qualify	
2015	Hokkaido Soccer League	3rd	14	10	0	4	27	14	13	30	Did not qualify	
2016	Hokkaido Soccer League	2nd	14	9	3	2	41	18	23	30	Did not qualify	
as Tokachi FC
2017	Hokkaido Soccer League	1st	14	10	2	2	39	22	17	32	Did not qualify	
as Hokkaido Tokachi Sky Earth
2018	Hokkaido Soccer League	1st	14	13	0	1	64	10	54	39	Did not qualify	
2019	Hokkaido Soccer League	1st	14	12	2	0	61	7	54	38	Did not qualify	
2020*	Hokkaido Soccer League	1st	7	7	0	0	38	4	34	21	Did not qualify	
2021*	Hokkaido Soccer League	1st	5	5	0	0	25	1	24	15	2nd round	
2022	Hokkaido Soccer League	2nd	14	10	2	2	53	6	47	32	Did not qualify	Round of 16
2023	Hokkaido Soccer League	2nd	14	13	0	1	79	9	70	39	Did not qualify	Round of 16
2024	Hokkaido Soccer League	1st	14	13	1	0	71	8	63	40	1st round	Round of 32
2025	Hokkaido Soccer League	2nd	14	11	3	0	38	6	32	36	Did not qualify	
2026	Hokkaido Soccer League	TBD	14								TBD	TBD

Key

- Position. = Position in league; P = Games played; W = Games won; D = Games drawn; L = Games lost; F = Goals scored; A = Goals conceded; GD = Goals difference; Pts = Points gained

== Honours ==
Hokkaido Tokachi Sky Earth honours
Honour	No.	Years
Hokkaido Soccer League	7	2014, 2017, 2018, 2019, 2020, 2021*, 2024

== Players ==
=== Current squad ===
As of 17 May 2025.

Note: Flags indicate national team as defined under FIFA eligibility rules; some limited exceptions apply. Players may hold more than one non-FIFA nationality.

No.	Pos.	Nation	Player
1	GK	JPN	Masahiro Uchino
2	DF	JPN	Shuhei Hashimoto
3	DF	JPN	Tsujita Riki
4	DF	JPN	Tetsuto Ta
5	DF	JPN	Yuki Fukai
6	DF	JPN	Tamari Koyama
7	MF	JPN	Takumiya Mizuno
8	MF	JPN	Takumi Seto
9	FW	JPN	Ryosuke Yamashita
10	MF	JPN	Tomoya Nakamura
11	MF	JPN	Shinshiro Fujiwara

No.	Pos.	Nation	Player
13	DF	JPN	Takumi Kawabe
14	MF	JPN	Yuto Kawai
16	MF	JPN	Rikiso Saito
17	MF	JPN	Taimu Usui
18	FW	JPN	Hiroya Kaneda
21	GK	JPN	Yuki Kaneko
22	DF	JPN	Tomo Sato
32	GK	JPN	Katsuki Milki
33	GK	JPN	Hibiki Ariyoshi
66	MF	JPN	Satoru Maruoka
77	MF	JPN	Daisuke Okada
99	MF	JPN	Rukiyasu Sato

== Club officials ==
These are listed on the official club website as the 2025 club officials.

Position	Name
Manager	(Japan) Yoshihiro Yatsugawa
First-team coach	(Japan) Toshiki Takagi
Goalkeeper coach	(Japan) Tetsuta Yamashita
Trainer	(Japan) Shun Tanaka
Competent	(Japan) Somako Ono (Japan) Tatsuo Nishiyama

== Stadiums ==
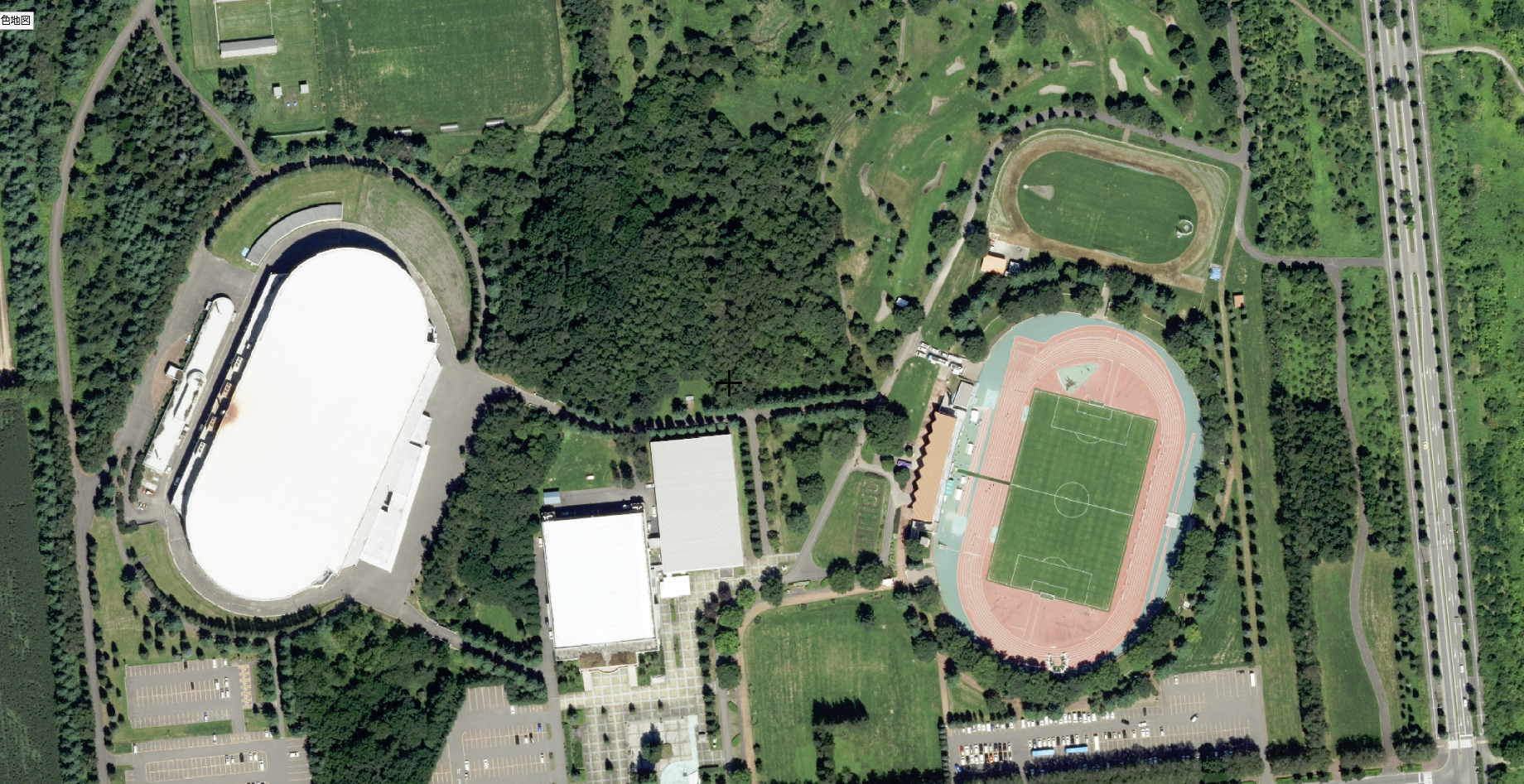
Obihiro Athletic Stadium

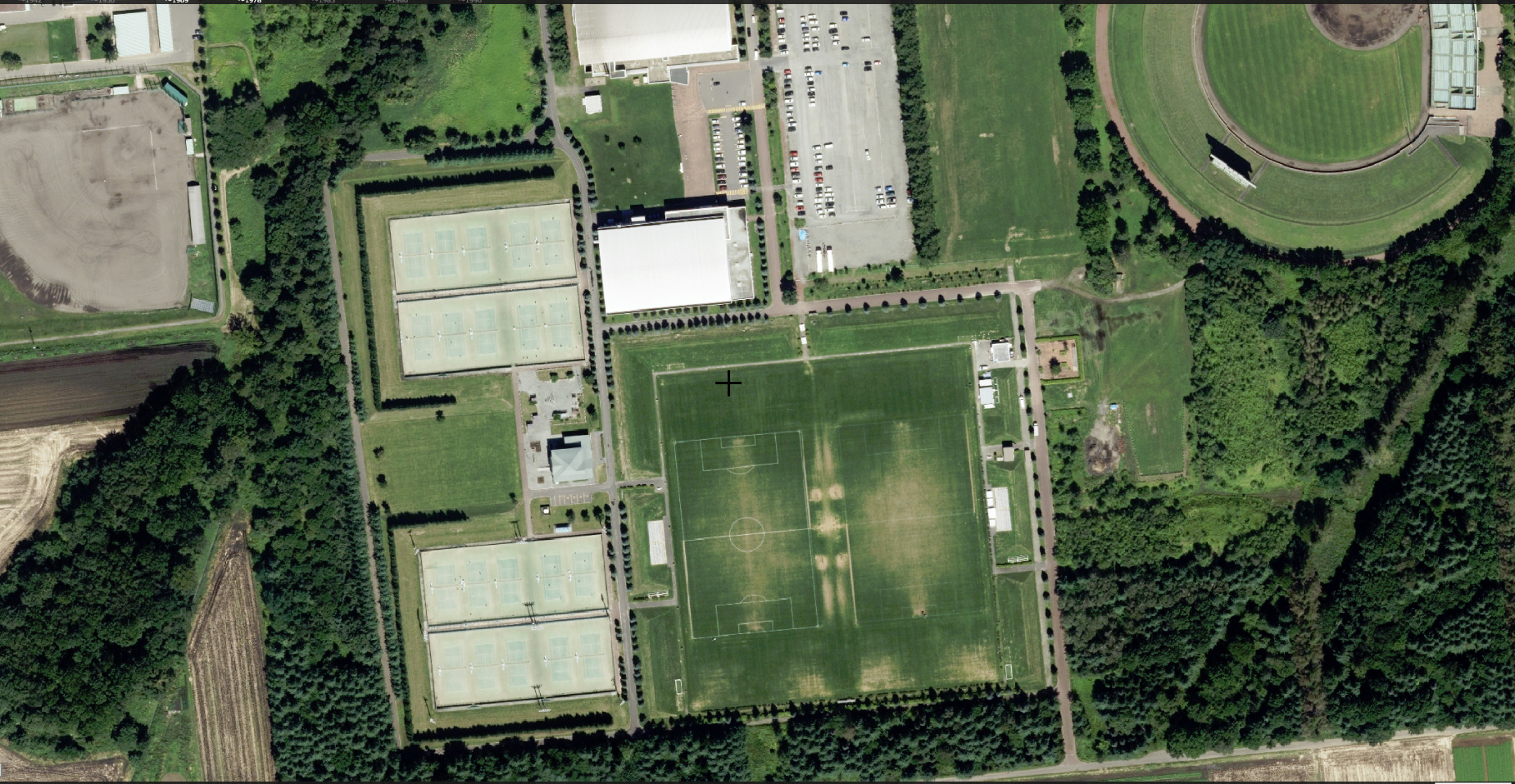
Obihiro Playing Field
