= Waseda United =

Japanese football club

Waseda United 早稲田ユナイテッド
- Founded: 2007; 19 years ago
- Chairman: Yuichiro Iwasaki
- Manager: Naoki Imaya
- League: Kantō Soccer League (Div. 2)
Home colours	Away colours

Waseda United (早稲田ユナイテッド, Waseda United) is a football club based in Nishitōkyō, Tokyo, which is located in Tokyo, Japan. They played in the Kantō Soccer League, until 2019, when they were relegated to the Tokyo prefectural league, which is part of Japanese Regional Leagues.

== History ==
Their main goal is becoming a professional football club, even though they only formed in 2007 and still play in the 2nd division of the Kanto Soccer League.

== Current squad ==
Updated to 15 November 2017.

== League record ==
Champions	Runners-up	Third place	Promoted	Relegated

Season	League	Pos.	P	W	D	L	F	A	GD	Pts
2015	Kantō Soccer League (Div. 2)	3rd	18	10	2	6	37	21	16	32
2016	Kantō Soccer League (Div. 2)	8th	18	6	3	9	24	31	-7	21
2017	Kantō Soccer League (Div. 2)	4th	18	8	4	6	41	33	8	28
2018	Kantō Soccer League (Div. 2)	8th	18	5	3	10	21	44	-23	18
2019	Kantō Soccer League (Div. 2)	9th	18	4	4	10	21	36	-15	16
2020	Tokyo	5th	7	3	2	2	7	6	1	11
2021	Tokyo	4th	16	10	2	4	27	18	9	32
2022	Tokyo	6th	13	7	2	4	21	14	7	23
2023	Tokyo	6th	18	8	5	5	44	31	13	29
2024	Tokyo	TBD	18	-	-	-	-	-	-	-

Key

- Pos. = Position in league; P = Games played; W = Games won; D = Games drawn; L = Games lost; F = Goals scored; A = Goals conceded; GD = Goals difference; Pts = Points gained
