= Ryutsu Keizai University FC =

Japanese football club

Ryutsu Keizai University FC 流通経済大学FC
- Full name: Ryutsu Keizai University Football Club
- Nickname: Ryu Kei Dai
- Founded: 1965; 61 years ago
- Ground: Hitachinaka Athletic Stadium; Hitachinaka, Ibaraki
- Capacity: 15,000
- Manager: (Japan) Shinya Tanaka
- League: Ibaraki Prefectural League
- 2022: KSL Div. 2, 10th of 10 (relegated)
| Home colours | Away colours |

Ryutsu Keizai University FC (流通経済大学FC, Ryūtū Keizai Daigaku Efu Shī) are a Japanese football (soccer) club of the Ryutsu Keizai University, based in Ryugasaki, Ibaraki Prefecture. They currently play in Ibaraki Prefectural League from 2023 after relegation from Division 2 of Kantō Soccer League in 2022. Their team colours are grey and navy.

== History ==
Founded in 1965, they played in the Ibaraki Prefecture University League until 1998. They were promoted to the Kantō University League Division 2 in 1999 but relegated after one season. They were promoted again in 2002.

In November 2004, with the recommendation from the Japan University Football Association, the club participated in the Regional League promotion series. They finished runners-up and were accepted by the Japan Football League. The club became the third university club that were allowed to play in the JFL following Kokushikan University SC and Shizuoka Sangyo University SC (the former withdrew and the latter was relegated).

As of 2010, the JFA has barred all university clubs from competing in the Regional Promotion Series, which means that no further university clubs can compete in the JFL. RKU, however, was still allowed to compete in the JFL until their relegation in the same season.

On the 2022 season, they were relegated to the Ibaraki Prefectural League from 2023 after finishing as the bottom-placed team of the Kantō Soccer League Division 2.

== Structure ==
The club has 2 top teams. One play in the university competitions, and the other participate in the JFL. They also have a reserve team called Ryutsu Keizai Dragons who play in the Kantō Soccer League Division 1, as well as 4 satellite teams categorized by age. All the players are students of the university.

== Results in JFL ==
2005: 13th
2006: 16th
2007: 10th
2008: 6th
2009: 15th
2010: 18th, relegated

== Honours ==
- Prime Minister Cup University football tournament

Champions (1): 2007

- Kantō University League

Champions (3): 2006, 2008, 2009
