= 2025 Japanese Regional Football Champions League =

2025 Japanese Regional Champions League
Tournament details
- Country: Japan
- Dates: 7–24 November 2025
- Teams: 12

Final positions
- Champions: J-Lease FC (1st title)
- Runners-up: Vonds Ichihara

Tournament statistics
- Matches played: 24

The 2025 Japanese Regional Football Champions League (全国地域サッカーチャンピオンズリーグ2025) was the 49th edition of the referred annually contested cup for the best-placed teams of each of their respective Regional Leagues, and of the 2025 Shakaijin Cup. Due to the winner being promoted to the Japan Football League (JFL), the club couldn't defend their title. Asuka FC were the title holders, as they won the championship in the final round. As Asuka were in the JFL, they were unable to defend their title.

== Format ==
Twelve teams participated in the transitional tournament for regional league teams that want to join the JFL. Nine qualified as champions of their respective Regional Leagues in 2025. The other three spots were by default allocated to the best three Shakaijin Cup teams out of its semi-finalists that were not yet qualified to the Champions League via the Regional Leagues (being placed below the champions of their league).

In case the slots couldn't be filled, in a situation where more than one semi-finalist had already qualified to the Champions League as regional champions, the empty slot(s) was rewarded to the J.League 100 Year Plan club status holders that finished the season as a Regional League runner-up. If more than one "status holders" finished the season as the 2nd-placed team in their respective Regional Leagues, an annually-rotated order of priority is taken into consideration. Only teams that want to join the JFL can be promoted. If a team with no intention to join the JFL ends up winning the final round, the promotion spot is allocated to the runner-up. If the runner-up also has no intention to be promoted, a spot is also allocated to the third-placed team. If they also refuse, the bottom-placed team is promoted instead. In all mentioned scenarios, the bottom-placed team of the 2025 Japan Football League could be relegated, and no play-off held. If both Regional Champions League winner and runner-up aim to be promoted, the winner is automatically promoted, whereas the runner-up holds a play-off match with JFL's bottom-placed team.

Depending on the clubs that ended up as the top three teams in the Shakaijin Cup, a specific rank that would take the J.League 100 Year Plan club status clubs and its performances in the 2025 Regional Leagues into account was applied to determine the final teams in this competition.

== Participating teams ==
Locations of clubs participating in the 2025 National Regional Football Champions League

Based on the tournament guidelines announced by the JFA

Returning teams from the previous season were noted in bold. Teams relegated from the previous JFL season were noted in italics.

Region	Slots	Team	Rank
Hokkaido	1	**BTOP Hokkaido**	1st (League)
Tohoku	1	Cobaltore Onagawa	1st (League)
Kantō	2	Tokyo United FC	1st (League)
Kantō	2	**Vonds Ichihara**	3rd (Cup)
Hokushin'etsu	1	Toyama Shinjo Club	1st (League)
Tōkai	1	Gakunan F Mosuperio (ja)	1st (League)
Kansai	2	Arterivo Wakayama	1st (League)
Kansai	2	Basara Hyogo (ja)	Finalist (Cup)
Chugoku	1	**Fukuyama City**	1st (League)
Shikoku	1	**FC Tokushima**	1st (League)
Kyushu	2	**J-Lease FC**	1st (League)
Kyushu	2	**Veroskronos Tsuno**	Finalist (Cup)

== Venue ==
First round

Group	Venue	Location	Image
A	Technoport Fukui Stadium	Sakai, Fukui	
B	Iwagin Stadium	Morioka, Iwate	
C	Kochi Haruno Stadium	Kochi, Kochi	

Final round

Venue	Location	Image
ZA Oripri Stadium	Ichihara, Chiba	

== First round ==
Each group had its matches played in a round-robin format. Each team played three matches in just three days, from 7 to 9 November, with one being played on each day.

=== Group A ===
Pos	Team	Pld	W	D	L	GF	GA	GD	Pts	Qualification
1	Veroskronos Tsuno (A)	3	2	1	0	4	1	+3	7	Advance to the final round
2	Gakunan F Mosuperio (E)	3	1	1	1	5	5	0	4	
3	Toyama Shinjo Club (E)	3	0	2	1	2	4	−2	2	
4	Arterivo Wakayama (E)	3	0	2	1	3	4	−1	2	

Updated to match(es) played on 9 November 2025. Source:
(A) Advance to a further round; (E) Eliminated

7 November	Toyama Shinjo Club	1 - 1	Gakunan F Mosuperio	Sakai
10:45	Iyima 83'	Report	Edo 53' (o.g.)	Stadium: Technoport Fukui Stadium

7 November	Arterivo Wakayama	0 - 0	Veroskronos Tsuno	Sakai
13:30		Report		Stadium: Technoport Fukui Stadium

8 November	Toyama Shinjo Club	0 - 0	Arterivo Wakayama	Sakai
10:45		Report		Stadium: Technoport Fukui Stadium

8 November	Gakunan F Mosuperio	0 - 1	Veroskronos Tsuno	Sakai
13:30		Report	Yamada 61'	Stadium: Technoport Fukui Stadium

9 November	Toyama Shinjo Club	1 - 3	Veroskronos Tsuno	Sakai
10:45		Report		Stadium: Technoport Fukui Stadium

9 November	Gakunan F Mosuperio	4 - 3	Arterivo Wakayama	Sakai
13:30	Harashina 59', 62'; Hiramayu 61'; Nakajima 68'	Report	Wada 43'; Mukai 70'; Fukasawa 82' (o.g.)	Stadium: Technoport Fukui Stadium

=== Group B ===
Pos	Team	Pld	W	D	L	GF	GA	GD	Pts	Qualification
1	Tokyo United FC (A)	3	2	0	1	4	1	+3	6	Advance to the final round
2	Fukuyama City (E)	3	2	0	1	3	2	+1	6	
3	Basara Hyogo (E)	3	2	0	1	2	1	+1	6	
4	Cobaltore Onagawa (E)	3	0	0	3	1	6	−5	0	

Updated to match(es) played on 7 November 2025. Source: JFA
(A) Advance to a further round; (E) Eliminated

7 November	Cobaltore Onagawa	0 - 3	Tokyo United	Morioka
10:45		Report	Okada 6'; Matsukubo 48'; Takizawa 67'	Stadium: Iwagin Stadium

7 November	Fukuyama City	1 - 0	Basara Hyogo	Morioka
13:30	Okubo 11'	Report		Stadium: Iwagin Stadium

8 November	Cobaltore Onagawa	1 - 2	Fukuyama City	Morioka
10:45	Shimura 18'	Report	Takahashi 66'; Son Ho-Gyon 82'	Stadium: Iwagin Stadium

8 November	Tokyo United	0 - 1	Basara Hyogo	Morioka
13:30		Report	Konobu 50'	Stadium: Iwagin Stadium

9 November	Cobaltore Onagawa	0 - 1	Basara Hyogo	Morioka
10:45		Report	Mori 47'	Stadium: Iwagin Stadium

9 November	Tokyo United	1 - 0	Fukuyama City	Morioka
13:30	Hakazaki 45+1'	Report		Stadium: Iwagin Stadium

=== Group C ===
Pos	Team	Pld	W	D	L	GF	GA	GD	Pts	Qualification
1	Vonds Ichihara (A)	3	3	0	0	11	0	+11	9	Advance to the final round
2	J-Lease (A)	3	2	0	1	6	2	+4	6	Advance to the final round
3	Tokushima (E)	3	1	0	2	5	10	−5	3	
4	BTOP Hokkaido (E)	3	0	0	3	0	10	−10	0	

Updated to match(es) played on 7 November 2025. Source: JFA
(A) Advance to a further round; (E) Eliminated

7 November	Vonds Ichihara	5 - 0	Tokushima	Kochi
10:45	Fujisaki 33'; Hashimoto 37'; Gunji 54'; Shinohara 76'; Goto 90+1'	Report		Stadium: Kochi Haruno Stadium

7 November	J-Lease	1 - 0	BTOP Hokkaido	Kochi
13:30	Takabatake 90+4'	Report		Stadium: Kochi Haruno Stadium

8 November	Vonds Ichihara	1 - 0	J-Lease	Kochi
10:45	Numa 49'	Report		Stadium: Kochi Haruno Stadium

8 November	FC Tokushima	4 - 0	BTOP Hokkaido	Kochi
13:30	Sata 13'; Taniyama 17'; Kato 41'; Fujiwara 61'	Report		Stadium: Kochi Haruno Stadium

9 November	Vonds Ichihara	5 - 0	BTOP Hokkaido	Kochi
10:45	Otsuka 18'; Nishinoue 56'; Yuji Besana Kato 60'; Yoshida 70'; Otomo 74'	Report		Stadium: Kochi Haruno Stadium

9 November	FC Tokushima	1 - 5	J-Lease	Kochi
13:30	Deoka 72'	Report	Torigai 10', 62'; Sonoda 26', 53'; Ogino 58'	Stadium: Kochi Haruno Stadium

=== Ranking of second-placed teams ===
The three winners of each group of the first round qualified for the final round, alongside the best-placed team among the runners-up of each group.

Pos	Team	Pld	W	D	L	GF	GA	GD	Pts	Qualification
1	J-Lease (A)	3	2	0	1	6	4	+2	6	Qualification for the final round
2	Fukuyama City (E)	3	2	0	1	3	2	+1	6	
3	Gakunan F Mosuperio (E)	3	1	1	1	5	5	0	4	

Updated to match(es) played on unknown. Source: JFA
(A) Advance to a further round; (E) Eliminated

== Final round ==
The group had its matches played in a round-robin format, held in a five-days span, from 20 to 24 November.

Pos	Team	Pld	W	D	L	GF	GA	GD	Pts	Promotion
1	J-Lease (C, P)	3	2	1	0	2	0	+2	7	Promoted to the JFL
2	Vonds Ichihara (O, P)	3	2	0	1	2	1	+1	6	Qualification for JFL promotion/relegation play-off
3	Veroskronos Tsuno	3	1	1	1	2	2	0	4	
4	Tokyo United	3	0	0	3	1	4	−3	0	

Updated to match(es) played on 24 November 2025. Source: https://www.jfa.jp/match/regional_league_2025/schedule_result/
(C) Champions; (O) Play-off winners; (P) Promoted

20 November	Tokyo United	0 - 1	Vonds Ichihara	Ichihara
10:45		Report	Ryuichi 50'	Stadium: ZA Oripri Stadium

20 November	Veroskronos Tsuno	0 - 0	J-Lease	Ichihara
13:30		Report		Stadium: ZA Oripri Stadium

22 November	Tokyo United	1 - 2	Veroskronos Tsuno	Ichihara
10:45	Ito 90+3'	Report	Suzuki 34'; Nakayama 90'	Stadium: ZA Oripri Stadium

22 November	Vonds Ichihara	0 - 1	J-Lease	Ichihara
13:30		Report	Torigai 51'	Stadium: ZA Oripri Stadium

24 November	Tokyo United	0 - 1	J-Lease	Ichihara
10:45		Report	Takayasu 63'	Stadium: ZA Oripri Stadium
Note: J-Lease was promoted to the JFL

24 November	Vonds Ichihara	1 - 0	Veroskronos Tsuno	Ichihara
13:30	Otsuka 65'	Report		Stadium: ZA Oripri Stadium
Note: Vonds Ichihara qualified for the relegation play-off against Atletico Suzuka Club.
