= 2024 All Japan Senior Football Championship =

Tournament details
- Country: Japan
- Dates: 19–23 October 2024
- Teams: 32

Final positions
- Champions: Japan Soccer College (1st title)
- Runners-up: FC Tokushima

Tournament statistics
- Matches played: 32

The 60th All Japan Senior Football Championship (Japanese: 第60回全国社会人サッカー選手権大会, Hepburn: Dai 60-kai zenkoku shakai hito sakkā senshuken taikai), officially known as the 2024 All Japan Adults Football Tournament, and commonly referred to as the 2024 Shakaijin Cup, was the 60th edition of the annually contested single-elimination tournament (or cup) for the best-ranked amateur clubs in Japan, non-league clubs (participating in Regional or Prefectural Leagues and not included in the nationwide league competitions).

FC Kariya were the defending champions, but were eliminated in the semifinals by Japan Soccer College and finished in fourth place. Japan Soccer College became champions, beating FC Tokushima in the final, earning them their first title in the competition. They also became only the third team from Hokushin'etsu to do so, and the only one from Niigata Prefecture.

== Venues ==
- Moriyama City
  - Yasugawa Historical Park Soccer Field (Big Lake)
    - Court B
    - Court C
- Otsu City
  - Ojiyama Sports Park Athletics Stadium
  - Ikadachi Park Lawn Ground
- Higashiomi City
  - Nunobiki Green Stadium
  - Kyocera Corporation Shiga Higashiomi Factory General Ground
  - Higashiomi City Notogawa Ground
- Koka City
  - Koka City Minakuchi Sports no Mori Athletics Stadium

== Tournament guidelines ==
Every match in the tournament were played with 40-minute halves, instead of the usual 45, resulting in 80 minutes of action in total, excluding added time. If a match is tied at full time, it would go directly to a penalty shoot-out, without extra time. Up to five substitutions were allowed, with a maximum of three substitution breaks (excluding half-time), as per FIFA's recommendation.

The top three teams from the tournament qualified for the 2024 edition of the Japanese Regional Champions League, which serves as the play-off for the Japan Football League. However, the top three teams are not necessarily the semi-finalists; rather, they will be the best-ranked teams in the "Shakaijin" among those that have not won their respective Regional Leagues.

Regarding suspensions, players or officials could be suspended for an upcoming match if they: (1) receive yellow cards in two consecutive matches, or (2) are shown a red card. Accumulated yellow cards were reset after the quarter-finals.

== Participating teams ==
Regional champions who have already qualified for the Regional Champions League are denoted in bold. Lower-tier clubs from the 6th tier or below are not eligible to play in the Regional Champions League and are denoted in italics.

Region	Slots	Team	Division (tier)
Shiga (Host)	1	Lagend Shiga FC	Kansai Soccer League D1 (5)
Hokkaido	2	BTOP Hokkaido	Hokkaido Soccer League (5)
Hokkaido	2	**Hokkaido Tokachi Sky Earth**	Hokkaido Soccer League (5)
Tohoku	2	Cobaltore Onagawa	Tohoku Soccer League D1 (5)
Tohoku	2	**Blancdieu Hirosaki**	Tohoku Soccer League D1 (5)
Kantō	7	**Vonds Ichihara**	Kantō Soccer League D1 (5)
Kantō	7	Tokyo United	Kantō Soccer League D1 (5)
Kantō	7	Toho Titanium	Kantō Soccer League D1 (5)
Kantō	7	Aries Tokyo FC (ja)	Kantō Soccer League D1 (5)
Kantō	7	Tokyo 23 FC	Kantō Soccer League D1 (5)
Kantō	7	Yokohama Takeru (ja)	Kantō Soccer League D2 (6)
Kantō	7	Shibuya City FC (ja)	Tokyo Football League D1 (7)
Hokushin'etsu	2	Fukui United	Hokushin'etsu Football League D1 (5)
Hokushin'etsu	2	Japan Soccer College	Hokushin'etsu Football League D1 (5)
Tōkai	4	Chukyo University FC (ja)	Tōkai Adult Soccer League D1 (5)
Tōkai	4	FC Kariya	Tōkai Adult Soccer League D1 (5)
Tōkai	4	FC Gifu SECOND (ja)	Tōkai Adult Soccer League D2 (6)
Tōkai	4	Tokai FC (ja)	Tōkai Adult Soccer League D2 (6)

Region	Slots	Team	Division (tier)
Kansai	5	Arterivo Wakayama	Kansai Soccer League D1 (5)
Kansai	5	Moriyama Samurai 2000 (ja)	Kansai Soccer League D1 (5)
Kansai	5	AS Laranja Kyoto	Kansai Soccer League D2 (6)
Kansai	5	Ococias Kyoto AC	Kansai Soccer League D2 (6)
Kansai	5	Route 11 (ja)	Osaka Platinum League (7)
Chugoku	3	**Fukuyama City**	Chugoku Soccer League (5)
Chugoku	3	SRC Hiroshima	Chugoku Soccer League (5)
Chugoku	3	Belugarosso Iwami	Chugoku Soccer League (5)
Shikoku	2	Tadotsu FC (ja)	Shikoku Soccer League (5)
Shikoku	2	**FC Tokushima**	Shikoku Soccer League (5)
Kyushu	4	**Veroskronos Tsuno**	Kyushu Soccer League (5)
Kyushu	4	J-Lease FC	Kyushu Soccer League (5)
Kyushu	4	Nobeoka Agata	Kyushu Soccer League (5)
Kyushu	4	Mitsubishi Nagasaki SC	Nagasaki Football League (7)

== Bracket ==
Round of 32
1	FC Kariya	4
32	Route 11	0
17	Toho Titanium	0 (5)
16	Belugarosso Iwami	0 (4)
9	Tokyo 23 FC	4
24	Hokkaido Tokachi Sky Earth	1
25	AS Laranja Kyoto	0
8	Veroskronos Tsuno	1
5	Vonds Ichihara	3 (3)
28	Japan Soccer College	3 (4)
21	Tadotsu FC	3
12	Mitsubishi Nagasaki SC	2
13	Blancdieu Hirosaki FC	1 (6)
20	Chukyo University FC	1 (5)
29	Fukuyama City FC	0
4	Shibuya City FC	1
3	FC Tokushima	2
30	FC Nobeoka Agata	0
19	FC Gifu Second	2 (4)
14	Ococias Kyoto AC	2 (3)
11	Tokai FC	0
22	SRC Hiroshima	3
27	BTOP Hokkaido	0
6	Tokyo United FC	3
7	Lagend Shiga FC	0
26	Aries Tokyo FC	1
23	Moriyama Samurai 2000	0
10	Cobaltore Onagawa	1
15	J-Lease FC	4
18	Yokohama Takeru	2
31	Fukui United FC	2
2	Arterivo Wakayama	1

Round of 16
FC Kariya	2
Toho Titanium	0
Tokyo 23 FC	0
Veroskronos Tsuno	1
Japan Soccer College	3
Tadotsu FC	0
Blancdieu Hirosaki FC	3
Shibuya City FC	1
FC Tokushima	3
FC Gifu Second	0
SRC Hiroshima	1 (4)
Tokyo United FC	1 (2)
Aries Tokyo FC	1
Cobaltore Onagawa	0
J-Lease FC	0 (7)
Fukui United FC	0 (6)

Quarter-finals
FC Kariya	2 (7)
Veroskronos Tsuno	2 (6)
Japan Soccer College	4
Blancdieu Hirosaki FC	1
FC Tokushima	3
SRC Hiroshima	1
Aries Tokyo FC	0 (3)
J-Lease FC	0 (5)

Semi-finals
FC Kariya	0 (3)
Japan Soccer College	0 (4)
FC Tokushima	1
J-Lease FC	0

Final
Japan Soccer College	1
FC Tokushima	0

== Schedule ==
All times are in UTC+09:00, according to Japan Standard Time (JST).

=== Round of 32 ===
19 October Match 1	FC Kariya	4–0	Route 11	Higashiōmi
11:00	Naoto Arai 10', 55'; Chihiro Otomo 30'; Ryo Ozaki 61'	Report		Stadium: Nunobiki Green Stadium

19 October 2	Toho Titanium	0–0 (5–4 p)	Belugarosso Iwami	Higashiōmi
11:00		Report		Stadium: Kyocera Corporation Shiga Higashiomi Factory General Ground

19 October 3	Tokyo 23 FC	4–1	Hokkaido Tokachi Sky Earth	Higashiōmi
11:00	Takehiro Hattori 26'; Yuga Fukumoto 38'; Sotaro Murakami 55'; Motoki Honda 64'	Report	Hiroya Kaneda 25'	Stadium: Higashiomi City Notogawa Ground

19 October 4	Laranja Kyoto	0–1	Veroskronos Tsuno	Moriyama
11:00		Report	Yuki Nakayama 78'	Stadium: Yasugawa Historical Park Soccer Field B Court

19 October 5	Vonds Ichihara	3–3 (3–4 p)	Japan Soccer College	Ōtsu
11:00	Ryuichi Ichiki 23'; Kodai Watanabe 26', 80'	Report	Kengo Ota 5', 64'; Shota Shinoda 40+3'	Stadium: Ikadachi Park Lawn Ground

19 October 6	Tadotsu FC	3–2	Mitsubishi Nagasaki	Ōtsu
11:00	Keita Mihara 25', 71'; Ichitaka Miyamoto 79'	Report	Eigo Jodai 23', 56'	Stadium: Ojiyama Sports Park Athletics Stadium

19 October 7	Blancdieu Hirosaki	1–1 (6–5 p)	Chukyo University FC	Moriyama
11:00	Teruyuki Takagi 40+1'	Report	Shotaro Sato 29'	Stadium: Yasugawa Historical Park Soccer Field C Court

19 October 8	Fukuyama City	0–1	Shibuya City	Kōka
11:00		Report	Tomoya Suzuki 39'	Stadium: Koka City Minakuchi Sports no Mori Athletics Stadium

19 October 9	FC Tokushima	2–0	Nobeoka Agata	Higashiōmi
13:30	Kai Nomura 56', 79'	Report		Stadium: Nunobiki Green Stadium

19 October 10	FC Gifu Second	2–2 (4–3 p)	Ococias Kyoto	Higashiōmi
13:30	Sho Muta 43'; Sota Kawabata 71'	Report	Tatsuki Noda 38'; Haruki Yamamura 80+6'	Stadium: Kyocera Corporation Shiga Higashiomi Factory General Ground

19 October 11	Tokai FC	0–3	SRC Hiroshima	Higashiōmi
13:30		Report	Tsubasa Maehara 34'; Takumi Niino 61'; Shoma Hirao 68'	Stadium: Higashiomi City Notogawa Ground

19 October 12	BTOP Hokkaido	0–3	Tokyo United	Moriyama
13:30		Report	Yu Hiramatsu 27'; Konosuke Kusazumi 49'; Takuto Matsukubo 60'	Stadium: Yasugawa Historical Park Soccer Field B Court

19 October 13	Lagend Shiga	0–1	Aries Tokyo FC	Ōtsu
13:30		Report	Taiyo Namazuta 40+4'	Stadium: Ikadachi Park Lawn Ground

19 October 14	Moriyama Samurai 2000	0–1	Cobaltore Onagawa	Ōtsu
13:30		Report	Kei Yoshida 30'	Stadium: Ojiyama Sports Park Athletics Stadium

19 October 15	J-Lease FC	4–2	Yokohama Takeru	Moriyama
13:30	Raisei Shimazu 21'; Takuma Sonoda 26', 55'; Yu Kijima 40+1'	Report	Koki Takada 13'; Kenta Nemoto 32'	Stadium: Yasugawa Historical Park Soccer Field C Court

19 October 16	Fukui United	2–1	Arterivo Wakayama	Kōka
13:30	Kohei Kitagawa 46'; Itsuki Takagai 77'	Report	Mikio Ono 49'	Stadium: Koka City Minakuchi Sports no Mori Athletics Stadium

=== Round of 16 ===
20 October 17	FC Kariya	2–0	Toho Titanium	Higashiōmi
11:00	Chihiro Otomo 40+5'; Masayuki Saito 57'	Report		Stadium: Kyocera Corporation Shiga Higashiomi Factory General Ground

20 October 18	Tokyo 23 FC	0–1	Veroskronos Tsuno	Moriyama
11:00		Report	Ken Takahashi 51'	Stadium: Yasugawa Historical Park Soccer Field C Court

20 October 19	Japan Soccer College	3–0	Tadotsu FC	Ōtsu
11:00	Yuma Ando 39', 42'; Kengo Ota 40+2'	Report		Stadium: Ojiyama Sports Park Athletics Stadium

20 October 20	Blancdieu Hirosaki	3–1	Shibuya City	Kōka
11:00	Taiga Hirao 10', 57'; Yoshifumi Iwai 55'	Report	Yutaka Ito 69'	Stadium: Koka City Minakuchi Sports no Mori Athletics Stadium

20 October 21	FC Tokushima	3–0	FC Gifu Second	Higashiōmi
13:30	Kuraba Kondo 40+2'; Koki Komatsu 77'; Keiya Yamahara 80+2'	Report		Stadium: Kyocera Corporation Shiga Higashiomi Factory General Ground

20 October 22	SRC Hiroshima	1–1 (4–2 p)	Tokyo United	Moriyama
13:30	Tsubasa Maehara 40+2'	Report	Takuto Matsukubo 32'	Stadium: Yasugawa Historical Park Soccer Field C Court

20 October 23	Aries Tokyo FC	1–0	Cobaltore Onagawa	Ōtsu
13:30	Jhonattan Matsuoka 24'	Report		Stadium: Ojiyama Sports Park Athletics Stadium

20 October 24	J-Lease FC	0–0 (7–6 p)	Fukui United	Kōka
13:30		Report		Stadium: Koka City Minakuchi Sports no Mori Athletics Stadium

=== Quarter-finals ===
21 October 25	FC Kariya	2–2 (7–6 p)	Veroskronos Tsuno	Moriyama
11:00	Naoto Arai 14'; ? 57' (o.g.)	Report	Shinma Sakai 45'; Yuki Nakayama 59'	Stadium: Yasugawa Historical Park Soccer Field C Court; Attendance: 235; Referee: Yutaka Hasegawa

21 October 26	Japan Soccer College	4–1	Blancdieu Hirosaki	Ōtsu
11:00	Ryota Watanabe 8'; Naoto Uemoto 15'; Shuto Ono 20'; Chikara Sakai 42'	Report	Kirito Iwasawa 58'	Stadium: Ojiyama Sports Park Athletics Stadium; Attendance: 350; Referee: Ryo Ogawa

21 October 27	FC Tokushima	3–1	SRC Hiroshima	Moriyama
13:30	Daiki Deoka 21', 55'; Junya Takabatake 71'	Report	Kishi Tsubone 14'	Stadium: Yasugawa Historical Park Soccer Field C Court; Attendance: 125; Referee: Takuya Kobayashi

21 October 28	Aries Tokyo	0–0 (3–5 p)	J-Lease FC	Ōtsu
13:30		Report		Stadium: Ojiyama Sports Park Athletics Stadium; Attendance: 350; Referee: Keita Watanabe
	Penalties
	Ryo Odajima (penalty scored); Ryota Okada (penalty scored); Hirohito Shinohara (penalty missed); Han Sung-gang (penalty scored)		(penalty scored) Ryusuke Hayashida; (penalty scored) Kosuke Fukumoto; (penalty scored) Takuma Sonoda; (penalty scored) Kodai Fujii; (penalty scored) Kohei Imayoshi

FC Kariya, Japan Soccer College and J-Lease FC qualified for the Regional Champions League.

=== Semi-finals ===
22 October 29	FC Kariya	0–0 (3–4 p)	Japan Soccer College	Higashiōmi
11:00		Report		Stadium: Nunobiki Green Stadium; Attendance: 480; Referee: Ryu Mashio
	Penalties
	Manato Akimoto (penalty scored); Kaito Kinoshita (penalty scored); Ryoto Ishizaka (penalty missed); Shuto Izuka (penalty scored); Matthew Sata (penalty missed)		(penalty scored) Shota Shinoda; (penalty scored) Taisei Ono; (penalty scored) Yuma Ando; (penalty scored) Kengo Ota

22 October 30	FC Tokushima	1–0	J-Lease FC	Higashiōmi
13:30	Kodai Himeda 49'	Report		Stadium: Nunobiki Green Stadium; Attendance: 270; Referee: Kiyoto Takeuchi

=== Third place play-off ===
23 October 31	FC Kariya	0-0 (4–5 p)	J-Lease FC	Higashiōmi
10:00		Report		Stadium: Nunobiki Green Stadium; Attendance: 320; Referee: Shoichiro Mikami
	Penalties
	Shoma Tanaka (penalty scored); Kaito Kinoshita (penalty scored); Yuto Sasagase (penalty scored); Shuto Izuka (penalty scored); Ryoto Ishizaka (penalty scored); Hayate Mukai (penalty missed)		(penalty scored) Ryusuke Hayashida; (penalty scored) Koki Kotegawa; (penalty scored) Takuma Sonoda; (penalty scored) Kodai Fujii; (penalty scored) Kohei Imayoshi; (penalty scored) Yuya Watanabe

=== Final ===
23 October 32	Japan Soccer College	1-0	FC Tokushima	Higashiōmi
12:30	Shota Shinoda 67'	Report		Stadium: Nunobiki Green Stadium; Attendance: 400; Referee: Kazuyoshi Karashima
