= 2024 Japanese Regional Football Champions League =

Japanese amateur leagues football season

2024 Japanese Regional Champions League
Tournament details
- Country: Japan
- City: Kyoto
- Dates: 8–24 November 2024
- Teams: 12

Final positions
- Champions: Asuka FC (1st title)
- Runners-up: VONDS Ichihara

Tournament statistics
- Matches played: 24
- Goals scored: 69 (2.88 per match)
- Attendance: 9,057 (377 per match)
- Top goal scorer: Kiyokawa Ryuishi (Asuka FC) (5 goals)
- All statistics correct as of 22 October 2025.

2024 Japanese Regional Football Champions League (全国地域サッカーチャンピオンズリーグ2024) was the 48th edition of the referred annually contested cup for the best-placed teams of each of their respective Regional Leagues, and of the 2024 Shakaijin Cup. Briobecca Urayasu was the title holder, as winners of the 2023 edition of the tournament. They currently playing in the Japan Football League, they are unable to defend their title.

== Overview ==
- Dates: 8–24 November 2024
- Number of Teams: 12
- Format: Preliminary round (3 groups of 4), followed by a final round (4 teams)

On 10 October 2024, the Japan Football Association (JFA) announced the tournament guidelines. Additionally, during the JFA Extraordinary Council Meeting on 24 December 2023, it was initially planned to host the first league under the Chūgoku Football Association's jurisdiction at Mimasaka Rugby and Soccer Stadium in Mimasaka City, Okayama Prefecture. However, it was later decided to hold the event in Shimane Prefecture instead.

The tournament regulations are modelled after those of the previous year (2023). However, following Sony Sendai FC's decision to cease activities at the end of the 2024 season and their submission of a withdrawal notice to the Japan Football League (JFL), the JFL Board of Directors met on 3 October 2024. After accepting Sony Sendai FC's withdrawal, they reviewed the rules for promotion and relegation between the JFL and regional leagues. Initially, the JFL Rules stated that the last-place team in the JFL would be automatically relegated, replaced by the first-place team in the Regional CL, while the second-to-last JFL team would face the Regional CL's second-place team in a replacement match. However, the Board decided to revise this rule as follows.

- The 1st place in the regional CL will be automatically promoted to the JFL, and the 2nd place in the regional CL will be replaced with the lowest team except for Sony Sendai in the JFL (automatic relegation from the JFL will not be implemented).
- If only either the 1st and 2nd place in the regional CL meet the JFL membership criteria, the team that meets the criteria will be automatically promoted to the JFL (no replacement match will be held, and the bottom of the JFL except for Sony Sendai will remain in the JFL).
- If neither the 1st and 2nd place in the Regional CL meet the JFL membership criteria, the team that meets the JFL membership criteria will be automatically promoted in the order of 3rd →4th place in the Regional CL (no replacement match will be held, and the bottom of the JFL except Sony Sendai will remain in the JFL).

== Venue ==
First round

Group	Venue	Location	Image
A	Iwata Sports Exchange Village Yumeria Ball Game Stadium	Iwata City, Shizuoka Prefecture	
B	Hitachinaka City Sports Park Athletic Stadium	Hitachinaka City, Ibaraki Prefecture	
C	Matsue Municipal Athletics Stadium	Matsue City, Shimane Prefecture	

Final round

Venue	Location	Image
Takebishi Stadium Kyoto	Ukyo-ku, Kyoto Kyoto Prefecture	

== Participating teams ==
Locations of clubs participating in the 2024 National Regional Football Champions League

Based on the tournament guidelines announced by the JFA.

1. 2024 Regional League Champions (9 teams)
  - Hokkaido: Hokkaido Tokachi Sky Earth
  - Tohoku 1st Division: Blancdieu Hirosaki
  - Kantō 1st Division: Vonds Ichihara
  - Hokushin'etsu 1st Division: Fukui United
  - Tōkai1st Division: FC Ise-Shima
  - Kansai 1st Division: Asuka FC
  - Chūgoku: Fukuyama City
  - Shikoku: FC Tokushima
  - Kyushu: Veroskronos Tsuno
2. Up to three teams from the participants of the 60th National Adult Soccer Championship can qualify. These include the top three teams that wish to join the JFL, rank among the best four or higher, belong to the top regional league, and have not already qualified for the tournament under criteria 1.
  - Winner: Japan Soccer College
  - Third place: J-Lease FC
  - Fourth place: FC Kariya
    - After the completion of the quarterfinals, the top four included the three clubs and FC Tokushima (Shikoku's first-place team and a tournament qualifier), confirming the participation of three teams.
3. If there are fewer than 12 teams meeting criteria 1 and 2, the J-League Centennial Initiative Club ranked second in each regional league will be added. If there are multiple candidates, priority will go to the club with the earliest approval date for the J-League Centennial Initiative Club. In addition, each club can qualify only once under this requirement.
4. If fewer than 12 teams qualify through criteria one to three, the second-place teams in the regional league will be considered. The team aiming to join the JFL will be selected based on the highest number of registered teams in the National Adult Soccer Federation as of June 2010 (Kantō → Kansai → Kyushu → Tōkai → Hokkaido → Chūgoku → Hokushin'etsu → Tohoku → Shikoku). In 2024, the order will change to Tohoku → Shikoku → Kantō.
  - It does not apply because twelve teams had qualified under the criteria one through three.

== Match format ==
Based on the tournament guidelines announced by the JFA.

- In the first round, twelve teams will be split into three groups of four, playing a round-robin league. Four teams will advance to the final round: the top team from each group and the best second-placed team overall. In the final round, these four teams will compete in another round-robin league.
  - The group draw was held on 26 October 2024, at the conference room in the Toyota Tokyo Building, where the JFA Secretariat is located, and was live streamed on the official YouTube channel of the Kansai Soccer League.
1. Among the winning teams of each regional league, three regional teams, including the venues for the first round (Hitachinaka: Ichihara, Yumeria Iwata: Ise-Shima, Matsue City: Fukuyama, referred to as "Group 1"), six teams that win other regional leagues ("Group 2"), and three teams participating in the company-wide frame (JSC, J Lease, Kariya, referred to as "Group 3"). It is predetermined that teams from "Group 1" and "Group 3" will not be placed in the same group.
2. "Pot 1" and "Pot 3" each contain one ball with a group name (A, B, C) written on it, while "Pot 2" holds two balls. There are three types of "Pots" (A, B, C), each containing balls labelled with position numbers (A-1 to C-4) for each group, along with a "lottery box" containing numbers 1 to 4.
3. First, the "lottery" will be drawn three times to decide the position of each group in the final round. The remaining spots will be filled by the wild card (the top second-place team from the first round).
4. Next, the three teams in the first group draw from "Pot 1" and match with the corresponding "Pot A, B, and C" to assign the first-round venue, group, and position of each team.
5. Next, the six teams in the second group will draw from "Pot 2" and the corresponding "Pot A, B, and C" to decide their positions.
6. Finally, the three teams in the third group draw from "pot 3" to decide their positions. In this process, the possibility of teams from the same regional league being in the same group is not taken into account.
- The games will consist of two 45-minute halves, making a total of 90 minutes. No extra time will be played or penalty shootouts.
- In both the first and final rounds, points are awarded for each match (win = 3, draw = 1, loss = 0), and rankings are based on the total points from the three matches. If teams are tied on points, the tiebreakers are goal difference, total goals scored, head-to-head record (not considered for determining the best second-place team), foul points, and finally, a lottery if no other criteria separate the teams.

== Match schedule ==
The draw was held on 26 October.

=== First round ===
==== Group A ====
Pos	Team	Pld	W	D	L	GF	GA	GD	Pts	Qualification or relegation
1	J-Lease FC (Q)	3	2	1	0	5	3	+2	7	Advanced to the Final round
2	Veroskronos Tsuno	3	1	2	0	3	2	+1	5	
3	FC Tokushima	3	1	1	1	4	2	+2	4	
4	FC Ise-Shima	3	0	0	3	2	7	−5	0	

Updated to match(es) played on 10 November 2024. Source: JFA
Rules for classification: 1) Points; 2) Goal difference; 3) Goals scored
(Q) Qualified for the phase indicated

8 November 2024
10:45

FC Tokushima	1 - 1	Veroskronos Tsuno
Takahata 69'	Match report	Kamimera 38'

Iwata Sports Exchange Village Yumeria
Attendance: 284
Referee: Soretsu Karashima

8 November 2024
13:30

J-Lease FC	3 - 2	FC Ise-Shima
Sonoda 39'; Ogino 58'; Shimazu 63'	Match report	Hamada 31'; Miyadera 34'

Iwata Sports Exchange Village Yumeria
Attendance: 308
Referee: Ken Tsukahara

9 November 2024
10:45

FC Tokushima	0 - 1	J-Lease FC
	Match report	Watanabe 87'

Iwata Sports Exchange Village Yumeria
Attendance: 259
Referee: Masatsu Hiratsuka

9 November 2024
13:30

Veroskronos Tsuno	1 - 0	FC Ise-Shima
Yamada 29'	Match report

Iwata Sports Exchange Village Yumeria
Attendance: 321
Referee: Ken Tsukahara

10 November 2024
10:45

FC Tokushima	3 - 0	FC Ise-Shima
Minamino 15'; Yamahara 70'; Nomura 90+4'	Match report

Iwata Sports Exchange Village Yumeria
Attendance: 369
Referee: Masatsu Hiratsuka

10 November 2024
13:30

Veroskronos Tsuno	1 - 1	J-Lease FC
Yamada 63'	Match report	En 13'

Iwata Sports Exchange Village Yumeria
Attendance: 298
Referee: Soretsu Karashima

==== Group B ====
Pos	Team	Pld	W	D	L	GF	GA	GD	Pts	Qualification or relegation
1	Vonds Ichihara (Q)	3	3	0	0	7	1	+6	9	Advanced to the Final round
2	Asuka FC	3	2	0	1	5	3	+2	6	
3	FC Kariya	3	1	0	2	7	6	+1	3	
4	Blancdieu Hirosaki	3	0	0	3	3	12	−9	0	

Updated to match(es) played on 10 November 2024. Source: JFA
Rules for classification: 1) Points; 2) Goal difference; 3) Goals scored
(Q) Qualified for the phase indicated

8 November 2024
10:45

Vonds Ichihara	4 - 0	FC Kariya
Suzuki 7'; Ichiki 23'; Numa 64'; Kato 71'	Match report

Hitachinaka City Sports Park Athletics Stadium
Attendance: 284
Referee: Ryo Munakata

8 November 2024
13:30

Asuka FC	3 - 2	Blancdieu Hirosaki
Okura 9'; Ohara 40'; Kiyokawa 90+4'	Match report	Ryosuke 16'; Teruyuki 85'

Hitachinaka City Sports Park Athletics Stadium
Attendance: 202
Referee: Kiyoto Takeuchi

9 November 2024
10:45

Vonds Ichihara	1 - 0	Asuka FC
Numa 84'	Match report

Hitachinaka City Sports Park Athletics Stadium
Attendance: 272
Referee: Sho Takagi

9 November 2024
13:30

FC Kariya	7 - 0	Blancdieu Hirosaki
Tanaka 12', 28', 60'; Suzuki 35', 44', 85'; Arai 75'	Match report

Hitachinaka City Sports Park Athletics Stadium
Attendance: 326
Referee: Ryo Munakata

10 November 2024
10:45

Vonds Ichihara	2 - 1	Blancdieu Hirosaki
Kato 56', 75'	Match report	5' (o.g.)

Hitachinaka City Sports Park Athletics Stadium
Attendance: 367
Referee: Kiyoto Takeuchi

10 November 2024
13:30

FC Kariya	0 - 2	Asuka FC
	Match report	Uryu 47'; Kiyokawa 59'

Hitachinaka City Sports Park Athletics Stadium
Attendance: 196
Referee: Sho Takagi

==== Group C ====
Pos	Team	Pld	W	D	L	GF	GA	GD	Pts	Qualification or relegation
1	Fukui United (Q)	3	1	2	0	1	0	+1	5	Advanced to the Final round
2	Fukuyama City	3	1	1	1	4	1	+3	4	
3	Hokkaido Tokachi Sky Earth	3	1	1	1	2	5	−3	4	
4	Japan Soccer College FC	3	1	0	2	2	3	−1	3	

Updated to match(es) played on 10 November 2024. Source: JFA
Rules for classification: 1) Points; 2) Goal difference; 3) Goals scored
(Q) Qualified for the phase indicated

8 November 2024
10:45

Fukuyama City	0 - 0	Fukui United
	Match report

Matsue Municipal Athletics Stadium
Attendance: 253
Referee: Yuki Nishida

8 November 2024
13:30

Hokkaido Tokachi Sky Earth	2 - 1	Japan Soccer College FC
Maruoka 23' (pen.); Kaneda 57'	Match report	Miyajima 90'

Matsue Municipal Athletics Stadium
Attendance: 157
Referee: Ryu Mao

9 November 2024
10:45

Fukuyama City	4 - 0	Hokkaido Tokachi Sky Earth
Okubo 28'; Yoshii 31'; Fujii 45+2'; Takahashi 81'	Match report

Matsue Municipal Athletics Stadium
Attendance: 310
Referee: Yasuhiro Udagawa

9 November 2024
13:30

Fukui United	1 - 0	Japan Soccer College FC
Keifuki 77'	Match report

Matsue Municipal Athletics Stadium
Attendance: 261
Referee: Yuki Nishida

10 November 2024
10:45

Fukuyama City	0 - 1	Japan Soccer College FC
	Match report	Watanabe 11'

Matsue Municipal Athletics Stadium
Attendance: 372
Referee: Ryu Mao

10 November 2024
13:30

Fukui United	0 - 0	Hokkaido Tokachi Sky Earth
	Match report

Matsue Municipal Athletics Stadium
Attendance: 262
Referee: Yasuhiro Udagawa

==== Ranking of second-placed teams ====
Pos	Team	Pld	W	D	L	GF	GA	GD	Pts	Qualification
B	Asuka FC (A)	3	2	0	1	5	3	+2	6	Advanced to the Final round
A	Veroskronos Tsuno	3	1	2	0	3	2	+1	5	
C	Fukuyama City	3	1	1	1	4	1	+3	4	

Source: JFA
(A) Advance to a further round

==== Final round ====
Pos	Team	Pld	W	D	L	GF	GA	GD	Pts	Qualification or relegation
1	Asuka FC (C, P)	3	2	0	1	4	5	−1	6	Advanced to the Final round
2	Vonds Ichihara (Q)	3	1	1	1	7	5	+2	4	Qualification for JFL promotion/relegation play-off
3	Fukui United	3	1	1	1	9	9	0	4	
4	J-Lease FC	3	0	2	1	4	5	−1	2	

Updated to match(es) played on 24 November 2024. Source: JFA
Rules for classification: 1) Points; 2) Goal difference; 3) Goals scored
(C) Champions; (P) Promoted; (Q) Qualified for the phase indicated

20 November 2024
10:45

Asuka FC	2 - 1	Vonds Ichihara
Kiyokawa 10', 90+4'	Match report	Riichi 53'

Takebishi Stadium Kyoto
Attendance: 395
Referee: Takamasa Funabashi

20 November 2024
13:30

Fukui United	3 - 3	J-Lease FC
Trunk 5', 8'; Haruhisa 90+3'	Match report	Sato 28'; Sonoda 36'; Matsumoto 45+3'

Takebishi Stadium Kyoto
Attendance: 439
Referee: Masaki Adachi

22 November 2024
10:45

Asuka FC	0 - 3	Fukui United
	Match report	Enomoto 46'; Ichikawa 70'; Oishi 86'

Takebishi Stadium Kyoto
Attendance: 587
Referee: Yuki Nishida

22 November 2024
13:30

Vonds Ichihara	0 - 0	J-Lease FC
	Match report

Takebishi Stadium Kyoto
Attendance: 456
Referee: Kenya Ohara

24 November 2024
10:45

Asuka FC	2 - 1	J-Lease FC
Ryuishi 40'; Kurasuke 81'	Match report	Nobu 39'

Takebishi Stadium Kyoto
Attendance: 903
Referee: Hiroki Tanabe

24 November 2024
13:30

Vonds Ichihara	6 - 3	Fukui United
Kiyohara 7'; Yoshida 40'; Ichiki 69'; Kato 80'; Sakuraba 86'; Taniguchi 90+4'	Match report	Wada 24'; Oishi 73'; Kitawaki 84'

Takebishi Stadium Kyoto
Attendance: 1,176
Referee: Hikashi Kawakatsu

== Final standings ==
- Champion: Asuka FC (Nara) – Promoted to JFL
- Runner-up: Vonds Ichihara (Chiba) – Qualified for promotion/relegation playoff
- Third place: Fukui United FC

== JFL/Regional Leagues promotion/relegation playoff ==
The play-off (Japanese: 2024年度JFL·地域入れ替え戦) took place on 1 December 2024.

1 December 2024
13:00 (JST)

Minebea Mitsumi (2024 JFL 16th)	1–0	Vonds Ichihara (2024 JRFCL runners-up)
Otsuka 90+2'	Match report (in Japanese)

Hinata Stadium, Miyazaki
Attendance: 440
Referee: Ryosuke Yamaoka

Minebea Mitsumi stayed in the JFL; Vonds Ichihara stayed in the Kantō Soccer League Division 1.
