= 2026 JFL Cup =

Japan Football League tournament

- Season: 2026
- Dates: 20 March – 7 June
- Champions: Okinawa SV
- Biggest home win: 4 games won by a 3 goal margin
- Biggest away win: Azul Claro Numazu 0–4 ReinMeer Aomori (19 April 2026)
- Highest scoring: Honda FC 4–2 Verspah Oita (4 April 2026)
- Highest attendance: 13,472; Criacao Shinjuku 0–0 ReinMeer Aomori (20 March 2026)
- Lowest attendance: 108; Minebea Mitsumi 2–1 Veertien Mie (19 April 2026)
- All statistics correct as of 22:12, 27 July 2026 (UTC).

The 2026 JFL Cup (Japanese: 2026ジェイエフエルカップ), was a one-off tournament organised by the JFA and Japan Football League and was part of the J.League's transition to an "autumn-spring system". All 16 clubs from the JFL (the fourth tier in the Japanese football pyramid) will participate.

== Overview ==
As the Japan Football League transitioned to an "autumn-spring system" in 2026, the JFL Cup was a special tournament held during the transitional period. There was no promotion or relegation based on the results of the tournament.

== Format ==
=== Regional round (20 March – 16 May) ===
The 16 teams competing in the 2026–27 Japan Football League were divided geographically into two divisions (East and West), consisting of 8 teams each. Each division played a round-robin, for 7 matches (3 or 4 home and 4 away matches) each, for a total of 56 games. A win is worth 4 points, a penalty shoot-out win is worth 2 points and a penalty shoot-out defeat is worth 1 point.

=== Rules ===
- If the winners can not be decided within 90 minutes, a penalty shoot-out will be played to decide the winners. For this tournament, the usual points system is retained, but the winners of the shoot-out will receive an extra point.
- Depending on the results, the following points will be awarded:
  - Wins after 90 minutes: 3 points
  - Penalty shootout wins: 2 points
  - Losses in penalty shootout: 1 point
  - Losses after 90 minutes: 0 points

=== Playoff round (30 May – 7 June) ===
Teams with the same placement in each group in the regional round competed over two legs on a home-and-away basis, consisting of four matches. The winners of each division contest the championship match, while the runners-up contest the third-place match to determine the top 4 teams. The first leg was held at the home ground of the East division club, and the second leg at the home ground of the West division club.

Points are awarded across both legs: three for a win, one for a draw, and none for a defeat. If the first leg ends level after 90 minutes, no extra time or penalty shoot-out is taken. After the second leg, the winner is determined by total points, then by goal difference if level on points. If the tie remains undecided, a penalty shoot-out is held, again without extra time.

=== Prize money ===
The top four teams at the end of the tournament received prize money of ¥2 million (US$18,223.23) for the winners, ¥1 million (US$9,111.62) for runners-up, ¥500,000 (US$4,555.81) for third place and ¥300,000 (US$2,733.49) for fourth place. There is also prize money awarded for individuals throughout the tournament:

- MVP (Most Valuable Player): One player from the winning team will receive ¥50,000 (US$455.58).
- Outstanding Player Awards: One player each from the runners-up, third-placed and fourth-placed teams will receive ¥30,000 (US$273.35), ¥30,000 (US$273.35) and ¥20,000 (US$182.23) respectively.

== Participating clubs ==
The 16 clubs participating in the Japan Football League in the 2026–27 season will participate.

Locations of teams in the 2026 JFL Cup.

Team	Location	Stadium	Capacity	2025 season	Region
Azul Claro Numazu	Numazu	Ashitaka Park Stadium	10,000	20th in J3	East
Briobecca Urayasu Ichikawa	Urayasu	Daiichi Cutter Field	2,100	3rd in JFL	East
Criacao Shinjuku	Shinjuku	Ajinomoto Field Nishigaoka	7,258	12th in JFL	East
Honda	Hamamatsu	Honda Miyakoda Soccer Stadium	2,506	1st in JFL	West
Iwate Grulla Morioka	Morioka	Iwagin Stadium	9,892	9th in JFL	East
J-Lease	Ōita	Oita Athletic Stadium	15,943	1st in JRFCL	West
Maruyasu Okazaki	Okazaki	Maruyasu Okazaki Ryuhoku Stadium	5,000	11th in JFL	West
Minebea Mitsumi	Miyazaki	Hinata Stadium	20,000	10th in JFL	West
Okinawa	Okinawa^{1}	Okinawa Athletic Park Stadium	12,270	8th in JFL	West
ReinMeer Aomori	Aomori	Kakuhiro Group Athletic Stadium	20,809	5th in JFL	East
Tiamo Hirakata	Hirakata	Tamayura Athletic Stadium	2,500	4th in JFL	West
Veertien Mie	Tōin^{2}	La Pita Toin Stadium	5,077	7th in JFL	West
Verspah Oita	Ōita^{3}	Resonac Soccer/Rugby Field	4,700	6th in JFL	West
Vonds Ichihara	Ichihara	ZA Oripri Stadium	14,051	2nd in JRFCL	East
Yokogawa Musashino	Musashino	Musashino Municipal Athletic Stadium	5,188	14th in JFL	East
YSCC Yokohama	Yokohama	NHK Spring Mitsuzawa Football Stadium	15,454	13th in JFL	East

Notes

1. Also based at Tomigusuku and Uruma.
2. Mainly based at Kuwana and Yokkaichi.
3. Mainly based at Beppu and Yufu.

== Regional round ==
=== League table ===
==== East Region ====
Pos	Team	Pld	W	PKW	PKL	L	GF	GA	GD	Pts	Qualification
1	ReinMeer Aomori	7	5	1	1	0	14	3	+11	23	Final
2	Iwate Grulla Morioka	7	3	2	1	1	13	9	+4	17	3rd–4th place playoff
3	Azul Claro Numazu	7	4	0	0	3	8	9	−1	16	
4	YSCC Yokohama	7	3	0	0	4	9	11	−2	12	
5	Yokogawa Musashino	7	2	1	1	3	7	8	−1	11	
6	Vonds Ichihara	7	2	1	1	3	4	7	−3	11	
7	Briobecca Urayasu Ichikawa	7	1	2	1	3	3	5	−2	9	
8	Criacao Shinjuku	7	0	1	3	3	6	12	−6	5	

Source: JFL
Rules for classification: 1) Points; 2) Goal difference; 3) Goals scored; 4) Head-to-head.

==== West Region ====
Pos	Team	Pld	W	PKW	PKL	L	GF	GA	GD	Pts	Qualification
1	Okinawa SV	7	4	0	1	2	13	7	+6	17	Final
2	J-Lease	7	3	1	1	2	7	5	+2	15	3rd–4th place playoff
3	Minebea Mitsumi	7	3	1	1	2	8	9	−1	15	
4	Tiamo Hirakata	7	3	1	0	3	13	11	+2	14	
5	Honda FC	7	2	2	2	1	7	5	+2	14	
6	Maruyasu Okazaki	7	2	2	2	1	5	4	+1	14	
7	Verspah Oita	7	3	0	0	4	9	13	−4	12	
8	Veertien Mie	7	1	0	0	6	4	12	−8	4	

Source: JFL
Rules for classification: 1) Points; 2) Goal difference; 3) Goals scored; 4) Head-to-head.

=== Results ===
==== East Region ====
Home \ Away	REI	IWA	AZU	YSC	YOK	VON	BRI	CRI
ReinMeer Aomori	—	2–2 (4–5 p)	—	—	—	3–1	2–0	—
Iwate Grulla Morioka	—	—	2–1	—	4–1	0–0 (3–5 p)	1–0	—
Azul Claro Numazu	0–4	—	—	—	2–1	0–1	—	2–0
YSCC Yokohama	0–2	3–2	1–2	—	—	—	—	—
Yokogawa Musashino	0–1	—	—	2–0	—	2–0	—	—
Vonds Ichihara	—	—	—	0–1	—	—	0–0 (2–4 p)	2–1
Briobecca Urayasu Ichikawa	—	—	0–1	2–0	0–0 (1–3 p)	—	—	1–1 (3–1 p)
Criacao Shinjuku	0–0 (2–4 p)	2–2 (9–10 p)	—	1–4	1–1 (5–4 p)	—	—	—

Source: JFL
Legend: Blue = home team win; Yellow = draw; Red = away team win.

==== West Region ====
Home \ Away	OKI	JLE	MIN	TIA	HON	MAR	VER	VEE
Okinawa SV	—	—	3–0	—	1–0	1–1 (5–6 p)	—	3–0
J-Lease	2–1	—	1–2	—	—	—	0–1	—
Minebea Mitsumi	—	—	—	—	0–0 (5–3 p)	1–1 (2–4 p)	0–2	2–1
Tiamo Hirakata	3–1	1–2	1–3	—	—	—	4–1	—
Honda FC	—	0–0 (7–6 p)	—	2–2 (7–8 p)	—	—	4–2	—
Maruyasu Okazaki	—	0–0 (1–4 p)	—	1–0	0–0 (2–3 p)	—	—	—
Verspah Oita	1–3	—	—	—	—	2–0	—	0–2
Veertien Mie	—	0–2	—	1–2	0–1	0–2	—	—

Source: JFL
Legend: Blue = home team win; Yellow = draw; Red = away team win.

== Play-off round ==
=== Final ===
Team 1	Agg.	Team 2	1st leg	2nd leg
ReinMeer Aomori	1–4	Okinawa SV	0–0	1–4

==== Matches ====
31 May 2026
13:00 JST

ReinMeer Aomori	0–0	Okinawa SV
	Report

Mutsu Sports Park Athletics Stadium
Attendance: 1,031
Referee: Masaaki Hiratsuka
7 June 2026
14:00 JST

Okinawa SV	4–1	ReinMeer Aomori
Irigaki 18', 35'; Ogawa 74'; Suto 75'	Report	Hashimoto 61'

Okinawa Athletic Park Stadium
Attendance: 975
Referee: Hiroki Murata

=== 3rd place play-off ===
Team 1	Agg.	Team 2	1st leg	2nd leg
Iwate Grulla Morioka	4–2	J-Lease	2–1	2–1

==== Matches ====
31 May 2026
18:00 JST

Iwate Grulla Morioka	2–1	J-Lease
Fujishima 32'; Machida 83'	Report	Tsumura 8'

Iwagin Stadium
Attendance: 1,114
Referee: Kai Oto
7 June 2026
12:00 JST

J-Lease	1–2	Iwate Grulla Morioka
Nobe 13'	Report	Yasuki 53'; Machida 87'

J-Lease Stadium
Attendance: 265
Referee: Ryu Mashio

== Final standings ==
Okinawa SV were crowned champions, with ReinMeer Aomori finishing runners-up.

Pos.	Team
1	Okinawa SV
2	ReinMeer Aomori
3	Iwate Grulla Morioka
4	J-Lease

== Awards ==
Four individual awards were presented at the end of the tournament.

Award	Player	Club
MVP (Most Valuable Player)	Kenshi Irigaki	Okinawa SV
Outstanding Players	Genichi Endo	ReinMeer Aomori
Outstanding Players	Jukiya Fujishima	Iwate Grulla Morioka
Outstanding Players	Takayuki Takayasu	J-Lease

== Season statistics ==
=== Top scorers ===
Rank	Player	Club	Goals
1	Jukiya Fujishima	Iwate Grulla Morioka	5
2	Kenshi Irigaki	Okinawa SV	4
2	Ryuki Yamaguchi	FC Tiamo Hirakata	4
2	Mu Kanazaki	Verspah Oita	4
2	Kenta Oka	ReinMeer Aomori	4
6	Shota Fujisaki	Verspah Oita	3
6	Sasuga Kiyokawa	FC Tiamo Hirakata	3
6	Yuma Mori	Azul Claro Numazu	3
6	Yosuke Suzuki	Minebea Mitsumi FC	3
6	Reoto Kodama	ReinMeer Aomori	3
6	Yuto Tsumura	J-Lease FC	3
6	Yu Machida	Iwate Grulla Morioka	3

== See also ==
- J1 100 Year Vision League
- J2/J3 100 Year Vision League
