= J-Lease FC =

Japanese football club

J-Lease FC ジェイリースFC
- Full name: J-Lease Football Club
- Founded: April 2018; 8 years ago
- Stadium: Oita Athletic Stadium
- Capacity: 15,943
- Owner(s): J-Lease Co., Ltd.
- Manager: Masaki Yanagawa
- League: Japan Football League
- 2025: Kyushu Soccer League, 1st of 10 (champions); JRFCL, 1st of 4 (champions, promoted)
- Website: j-lease-fc.com
Home colours	Away colours

J-Lease FC (ジェイリースFC, Jei Rīsu Efu Shī) are a Japanese football club based in Oita City, capital of Oita Prefecture. They are set to play in the Japan Football League from 2026–27, the fourth tier of Japanese football after promotion from Regional Leagues in 2025. Their main colors, reflected on their crest are blue, white and black.

== History ==
Founded in April 2018, the club quickly won back-to-back promotions alongside league titles from the 3rd to the 1st division of the Oita Prefecture between 2018 and 2020.

In 2021, the club won their first regional-level trophy, after a 4–3 win against Liberty FC gave them the Kyushu Football Championship title. The club would have qualified to the Shakaijin Cup with this win, if the 2021 competition was not cancelled because of COVID-19 extended measures. The club recorded a 3rd place in its Kyushu Soccer League's debut season, only finishing behind Okinawa SV and Veroskronos Tsuno.

In 2022, the club participated in the Oita Prefecture Soccer Championship, which serves as a qualifying tournament for the Emperor's Cup. The club won their matches from the Round of 16 to the semi-finals against SOL FC, Nakatsu FC, and Nippon Bunri University ASC. In the final against Verspah Oita, which determined who would qualify for the Emperor's Cup, COVID-19 struck the team. With multiple players testing positive for the virus, the final could not take place on the scheduled date. J-Lease decided to forfeit the match, giving the Oita Prefecture slot in the competition to their opponent.

In the same year, J-Lease qualified for the Shakaijin Cup for first time, a cup tournament for teams in any league below the Japan Football League (JFL) that also serves as an alternative way to play in JFL's promotion series. The club qualified via the Kyushu Football Championship, which was a single match against Mitsubishi Heavy Industries Nagasaki. They won the match by 4–0. In their competition debut, they faced eventual semi-finalists of the Shakaijin Cup, Briobecca Urayasu, who were promoted to the Japan Football League in the same season. J-Lease lost the match by 2–0, exiting the competition in the first round.

Ending their season, the club finished in fourth place in the Kyushu Soccer League, having at one point won six matches in a row. Despite not earning a trophy at any competition, the club had high placements in Kyushu competitions and a decent performance against a JFL-tier club in an official competition during the season.

In 2024, Masaki Yanagawa was hired as the manager. In the Oita Prefectural Football Championship, they defeated Verspah Oita 2-0 in the final match to win the title for the first time and qualify for their first appearance in the 104th Emperor's Cup. In the Kyushu league, the team finished in second place, seven points behind Veroskronos Tsuno. In the 2024 All Japan Senior Football Championship, in the first round, J-Lease beat Yokohama Takeru 4-2. In the second round they beat Fukui United FC 7-6 in a penalty shoot-out after drawing nil all draw. In the quarterfinals round the also won after a penalty shoot-out by 5-3 after a nil draw against Aries Tokyo FC. In the semi-final they lost to FC Tokushima by 1-0. In the third-place playoff game against FC Kariya, another nil all draw was followed by a penalty shoot-out and a victory by 5-4 to win the bronze medal and qualification for the 2024 Regional Champions League.
In the final tournament J-Lease were pitted in Group A against FC Ise-Shima from the Tōkai Adult Soccer League, FC Tokushima from the Shikoku Soccer League and their compatriots from Kyushu Soccer League, Veroskronos Tsuno. They topped Group A by beating FC Ise-Shima 3-2 with a come from behind win in their opening game and getting revenge against FC Tokushima by winning 1-0 in the second match, in the final Group A match they drew with Veroskronos Tsuno 1-1.
The Final round they were pitted against Fukui United from Hokushin'etsu, Vonds Ichihara from Kantō and the eventual champions, Asuka FC from Kansai. They opened with a 3-3 draw against Fukui United. In the second match the also drew with their opponents, Vonds Ichihara 0-0. In the final winner takes all game against FC Asuka, they lost by 2-1 and finished fourth in the group with two points from the three matches.

On 24 November 2025, J-Lease secured promotion to the Japan Football League for the first time in their history after defeating Tokyo United 1–0 and finishing top of the table in the 2025 Japanese Regional Football Champions League.

== Club record ==
Champions	Runners-up	Third place	Promoted	Relegated

Season	League	Position	P	W	D	L	F	A	GD	Pts	Emperor's Cup	Shakaijin Cup
2018	Oita Prefectural; League (Div.3)	1st	9	8	1	0	11	0	11	25	Did not qualify	Did not play
2019	Oita Prefectural; League (Div.2)	1st	10	10	0	0	12	2	10	30	Did not qualify	Did not play
2020	Oita Prefectural; League (Div.1)	1st	10	8	1	1	13	2	11	25	Did not qualify	Was not held
2021	Kyushu Soccer League	3rd	18	13	0	5	38	19	19	39	Did not qualify	Was not held
2022	Kyushu Soccer League	4th	20	13	2	5	45	17	28	41	Did not qualify	1st Round
2023	Kyushu Soccer League	3rd	18	13	3	2	67	13	54	42	Did not qualify	Quarter-final
2024	Kyushu Soccer League	2nd	18	13	3	2	58	16	42	42	2nd round	3rd
2025	Kyushu Soccer League	1st	18	15	2	1	58	15	43	47	Did not qualify	2nd round
2026–27	Japan Football League	TBD	30								TBD	Ineligible

Key

- Pos. = Position in league; P = Games played; W = Games won; D = Games drawn; L = Games lost; F = Goals scored; A = Goals conceded; GD = Goals difference; Pts = Points gained

== Honours ==
J-Lease honours
Honour	No.	Years
Oita FA President's Cup Championship	1	2018
Oita Prefecture Soccer League 3rd Division	1	2018
Oita Prefecture Soccer League 2nd Division	1	2019
Oita Prefecture Soccer League 1st Division	1	2020
Oita Prefecture Soccer Tournament	1	2020
Oita Prefectural Football Championship Emperor's Cup Prefectural Qualifiers	1	2024
Kyushu Soccer League	1	2025
Japanese Regional Football Champions League	1	2025

== Current squad ==
As of 29 March 2025.

Note: Flags indicate national team as defined under FIFA eligibility rules; some limited exceptions apply. Players may hold more than one non-FIFA nationality.

No.	Pos.	Nation	Player
3	DF	JPN	Shohei Kishida
4	DF	JPN	Takuma Fukasawa
5	DF	JPN	Takuto Honda
6	MF	JPN	Yuya Watanabe
7	MF	JPN	Rei Matsumoto
8	DF	JPN	Junya Takahata
9	MF	JPN	Shimazu Yorimori
10	DF	JPN	Ryusuke Hayashida
11	MF	JPN	Kota Ogino
13	MF	JPN	Takayuki Takayasu
14	MF	JPN	Kohei Imayoshi (Vice captain)
15	FW	JPN	Yuta Enbu
16	DF	JPN	Kosuke Fukumoto
17	DF	JPN	Koyo Sato (Vice captain)
18	FW	JPN	Yumeto Tsumura
19	FW	JPN	Takuma Sonoda

No.	Pos.	Nation	Player
20	FW	JPN	Torikai Kōhei
21	GK	JPN	Daiki Kato
22	DF	JPN	Menya Yukit
23	GK	JPN	Kazusa Iwasaki
24	FW	JPN	Yu Kijima
25	MF	JPN	Junpei Tanaka
26	GK	JPN	Ryo Matsuda
27	MF	JPN	Hiroki Kanno
29	MF	JPN	Yosuke Yuzawa
30	MF	JPN	Kohei Hattanda (Captain)
32	MF	JPN	Kyosei Nagamatsu
41	MF	JPN	Kosei Hamaguchi
77	MF	JPN	Megumi Nishida (Vice captain)

== Coaching staff ==
For the 2025 season

Position	Name
Manager	(Japan) Masaki Yanagawa
Coach	(Japan) Tetsuya Yamazaki
Goalkeeper coach	(North Korea) Kim Jong-hsien
Assistant Coach	(Japan) Tatsuya Ikeda
Trainer	(Japan) Kazuya Kuramoto
Competent	(Japan) Harusuke Ohno
