= Rei Matsumoto =

Japanese footballer (born 1988)

Rei Matsumoto 松本 怜
Personal information
- Full name: Rei Matsumoto
- Date of birth: February 25, 1988 (age 38)
- Place of birth: Muroran, Hokkaido, Japan
- Height: 1.75 m (5 ft 9 in)
- Position: Midfielder

Team information
- Current team: J-Lease FC
- Number: 7

Youth career
- 2006–2009: Waseda University

Senior career*
Years	Team	Apps	(Gls)
2010–2014	Yokohama F. Marinos	19	(0)
2013–2014	→ Oita Trinita (loan)	33	(2)
2015–2022	Oita Trinita	208	(10)
2023–	J-Lease FC	0	(0)
- * Club domestic league appearances and goals as of 30 December 2022, 12:10 (UTC)

Rei Matsumoto (松本 怜,Matsumoto Rei, born February 25, 1988) is a Japanese football player for J-Lease FC from 2023.

== Career ==
Matsumoto studied and played for Waseda University from 2006 until his graduation on 2009.

Matsumoto began his professional career with Yokohama F. Marinos on 2010.

On 7 January 2013, Matsumoto was loaned out to Oita Trinita. Two years later, his loan became permanent as he was signed by Oita on a full transfer. He left the club after ten years on 2022.

On 25 December 2022, Matsumoto was officially announced as a new signing for J-Lease FC, to play the 2023 season in the Kyushu Soccer League.

== Career statistics ==
Updated to the end of 2022 season.

Club performance			League		Cup		League Cup		Other		Total	
Season	Club	League	Apps	Goals	Apps	Goals	Apps	Goals	Apps	Goals	Apps	Goals
Japan			League		Emperor's Cup		J. League Cup		Other^{1}		Total	
2010	Yokohama F. Marinos	J1 League	5	0	2	0	0	0	–		7	0
2011	Yokohama F. Marinos	J1 League	1	0	3	0	0	0	–		4	0
2012	Yokohama F. Marinos	J1 League	13	0	1	1	4	0	–		18	1
2013	Oita Trinita	J1 League	8	1	1	0	0	0	–		9	1
2014	Oita Trinita	J2 League	25	1	0	0	–		–		25	1
2015	Oita Trinita	J2 League	27	1	2	1	–		2	0	31	2
2016	Oita Trinita	J3 League	27	1	3	0	–		–		30	1
2017	Oita Trinita	J2 League	31	3	1	0	–		–		32	3
2018	Oita Trinita	J2 League	42	4	0	0	–		–		42	4
2019	Oita Trinita	J1 League	34	0	2	0	0	0	–		36	0
2020	Oita Trinita	J1 League	22	1	–		3	0	–		25	1
2021	Oita Trinita	J1 League	14	0	5	0	2	0	–		21	0
2022	Oita Trinita	J2 League	11	0	1	0	3	0	–		15	0
2023	J-Lease FC	Kyushu Soccer League	0	0	0	0	0	0	–		0	0
Career total			260	12	21	2	12	0	2	0	295	14

^{1}Includes J3 Relegation Playoffs.
