= Yu Kijima =

Japanese footballer

Personal information
- Full name: Yu Kijima
- Date of birth: May 18, 1986 (age 40)
- Place of birth: Kobe, Hyogo, Japan
- Height: 1.69 m (5 ft 6 1/2 in)
- Position: Forward

Team information
- Current team: J-Lease FC

College career
Years	Team	Apps	(Gls)
2005–2008	University of Tsukuba		

Senior career*
Years	Team	Apps	(Gls)
2009–2011	Shimizu S-Pulse	0	(0)
2012–2014	Oita Trinita	52	(6)
2015–2018	Verspah Oita	44	(14)
2021–	J-Lease FC	40	(5)
Medal record
Shimizu S-Pulse
Runner-up	Emperor's Cup	2010
- * Club domestic league appearances and goals as of 9 April 2023

Yu Kijima (木島 悠, Kijima Yu; born May 18, 1986) is a Japanese footballer who plays as a forward for J-Lease FC.

== Career statistics ==
Updated to 9 April 2023.

Appearances and goals by club, season and competition
Club	Season	League			Emperor's Cup		J.League Cup		Total	
Club	Season	Division	Apps	Goals	Apps	Goals	Apps	Goals	Apps	Goals
Shimizu S-Pulse	2009	J1 League	0	0	1	0	1	0	2	0
Shimizu S-Pulse	2010	J1 League	0	0	2	0	1	0	3	0
Shimizu S-Pulse	2011	J1 League	0	0	0	0	0	0	0	0
Oita Trinita	2012	J2 League	28	4	1	0	—		29	4
Oita Trinita	2013	J1 League	11	1	1	0	3	1	15	2
Oita Trinita	2014	J2 League	13	1	0	0	—		13	1
Verspah Oita	2015	JFL	30	13	2	2	—		32	15
Verspah Oita	2016	JFL	14	1	—		—		14	1
Verspah Oita	2017	JFL	30	3	2	0	—		32	3
Verspah Oita	2018	JFL	17	1	1	0	—		18	1
J-Lease FC	2021	KSL	18	0	—		—		18	0
J-Lease FC	2022	KSL	19	5	—		—		19	5
J-Lease FC	2023	KSL	3	0	—		—		3	0
Career total			183	27	7	2	5	1	198	30
