= Koyo Sato =

Japanese footballer (born 1996)

Koyo Sato 佐藤 昂洋
Personal information
- Full name: Koyo Sato
- Date of birth: April 14, 1996 (age 30)
- Place of birth: Ōita, Japan
- Height: 1.79 m (5 ft 10 in)
- Position: Defender

Team information
- Current team: J-Lease FC
- Number: 18

Youth career
- 2006–2014: Oita Trinita Youth

Senior career*
Years	Team	Apps	(Gls)
2015–2023	Oita Trinita	0	(0)
2015	→ Verspah Oita (loan)	1	(0)
2018	→ ReinMeer Aomori (loan)		
2023-	J-Lease FC	0	(0)
- * Club domestic league appearances and goals as of 23 February 2018

Koyo Sato (佐藤 昂洋, Satō Kōyō; born April 14, 1996 in Ōita, Ōita) is a Japanese footballer who plays for J-Lease FC .

== Career ==
Koyo Sato joined the J2 League club Oita Trinita in 2015. In March of that year, he was loaned to Japan Football League club Verspah Oita. In June, he returned back to Oita Trinita. On September 22, 2016, he made his professional debut in Emperor's Cup (v Shimizu S-Pulse). In 2023 he moved to the Kyushu league team J-Lease FC

== Club statistics ==
Updated to 23 February 2018.

Club performance			League		Cup		Total	
Season	Club	League	Apps	Goals	Apps	Goals	Apps	Goals
Japan			League		Emperor's Cup		Total	
2015	Oita Trinita	J2 League	0	0	0	0	0	0
2015	Verspah Oita	JFL	1	0	0	0	1	0
2016	Oita Trinita	J3 League	0	0	1	0	1	0
2017	Oita Trinita	J2 League	0	0	0	0	0	0
Career total			1	0	1	0	2	0
