= 2025 Japanese Regional Leagues =

Japanese amateur leagues football season

Japanese Regional Leagues
- Season: 2025
- Promoted: J-Lease FC, Vonds Ichihara

The 2025 Japanese Regional Leagues (Japanese: 2025 地域リーグ, Hepburn: 2025 Chiiki Rīgu) is the 60th edition of the Japanese Regional Leagues, which comprises the fifth and sixth tier of the Japanese football league system. The winners of the first division of each Regional League, along with the three best-placed teams of the Shakaijin Cup, will qualify for the 2025 Regional Champions League, competing for a spot in the 2026–27 JFL. Currently, no changes were publicly presented from the 2025 format of JFL promotion.

== Champions list ==
Region	Champions
Hokkaidō	BTOP Hokkaido
Tohoku	Cobaltore Onagawa
Kantō	Tokyo United
Hokushin'etsu	Toyama Shinjo Club
Tōkai	Gakunan F. Mosuperio (ja)
Kansai	Arterivo Wakayama
Chūgoku	Fukuyama City
Shikoku	FC Tokushima
Kyushu	J-Lease

== Regional League Standings ==
=== Hokkaidō ===
BTOP Hokkaidō won the Hokkaidō League with twelve victories from fourteen matches and a goal difference of +41, qualifying for the Regional Champions League.

Pos	Team	Pld	W	D	L	GF	GA	GD	Pts	Qualification or relegation
1	BTOP Hokkaidō (C, Q)	14	12	0	2	55	14	+41	36	Qualification for the 2025 Regional Champions League
2	Hokkaido Tokachi Sky Earth	14	11	3	0	38	6	+32	36	
3	Norbritz Hokkaido	14	6	3	5	23	26	−3	21	
4	Sapporo University Goal Plunderers (ja)	14	6	2	6	29	21	+8	20	
5	sabas FC	14	6	1	7	24	33	−9	19	
6	ASC Hokkaidō (ja)	14	6	0	8	20	25	−5	18	
7	Nippon Steel Muroran (ja) (R)	14	2	2	10	15	48	−33	8	Relegated to the South Hokkaidō Block League
8	Canale Otaru (ja) (R)	14	1	1	12	19	50	−31	4	Relegated to the Central and Northern Hokkaidō Block League

Updated to match(es) played on 21 September 2025. Source: Hokkaido Football Association >
Rules for classification: 1) Points; 2) Goal difference; 3) Goals scored 4) Head-to-head points 5) Head-to-head goal difference 6) Head-to-head
(C) Champions; (Q) Qualified for the phase indicated; (R) Relegated

==== Results ====
Home \ Away	ASC Hokkaidō (ASC)	BTK	Canale Otaru (CAN)	HTS	NOR	Nippon Steel Muroran (NSM)	SAB	Sapporo University Goal Plunderers (SGP)
ASC Hokkaidō (ja)		0–3	2–1	1–3	1–3	5–0	1–0	1–0
BTOP Hokkaidō	3–0		9–2	0–1	2–1	3–0	5–1	3–2
Canale Otaru (ja)	1–3	0–4		2–5	1–3	2–1	1–2	3–6
Hokkaidō Tokachi Sky Earth	2–1	1–0	5–0		0–0	4–0	9–0	0–0
Norbritz Hokkaidō	2–1	1–3	3–2	0–3		1–1	1–5	2–1
Nippon Steel Muroran (ja)	0–3	1–12	3–2	0–1	3–3		3–0 (Note: Although the actual score of the match was 2-0 and SABAS won, SABAS had a player who was not eligible to participate, so it was a forfeiture match (treated as a 3-0 victory by Japan Steel Muroran).)	1–4
sabas FC	1–0	3–5	2–2	1–3	1–0	5–2		0–1
Sapporo University Goal Plunderers (ja)	6–1	1–3	2–0	1–1	2–3	3–0	0–3	

Updated to match(es) played on 21 September 2025. Source: source= Hokkaido Football Association
Legend: Blue = home team win; Yellow = draw; Red = away team win.

=== Tohoku ===
==== Division 1 ====
Pos	Team	Pld	W	D	L	GF	GA	GD	Pts	Qualification or relegation
1	Cobaltore Onagawa (C, Q)	18	18	0	0	62	5	+57	54	Qualified for the 2025 Regional Champions League
2	Blancdieu Hirosaki	18	14	0	4	46	17	+29	42	
3	Hitome Senbonzakura SUFT (ja)	18	11	2	5	47	17	+30	35	
4	Sendai University Satellite A	18	10	3	5	35	23	+12	33	
5	Michinoku Sendai (ja)	18	5	8	5	37	35	+2	23	
6	Ganju Iwate	18	6	4	8	24	27	−3	22	
7	Shichigahama SC (ja)	18	5	3	10	31	48	−17	18	
8	Shichinohe SC (ja)	18	4	4	10	23	36	−13	16	
9	Fuji Club 2003 (ja) (R)	18	1	4	13	13	42	−29	7	Relegated to Tohoku Division 2 North
10	Sendai Sasuke (ja) (R)	18	2	0	16	13	81	−68	6	Relegated to Tohoku Division 2 South

Updated to match(es) played on 12 October 2025. Source: Tohoku Football Federation
Rules for classification: 1) Points, 2) Goal difference, 3) Total goals, 4) Head-to-head points, 5) Head-to-head goal difference, 6) Head-to-head goals, 7) Foul points, 8) Lottery
(C) Champions; (Q) Qualified for the phase indicated; (R) Relegated

===== Results =====
Home \ Away	BLA	COB	Fuji Club 2003 (FUJ)	GAN	Hitome Senbonzakura SUFT (HIT)	Michinoku Sendai (MIC)	Sendai Sasuke (SSA)	Shichigahama SC (SHG)	Shichinohe SC (SHN)	Sendai University Satellite A (SUS)
Blancdieu Hirosaki		0–3	2–1	3–0	1–3	1–0	1–0	1–0	3–0	4–1
Cobaltore Onagawa	5–1		2–0	4–0	1–0	5–0	2–0	4–1	6–1	2–1
Fuji Club 2003 (ja)	0–5	0–5		2–4	0–1	0–0	0–2	3–2	0–2	1–1
Ganju Iwate	1–0	0–2	4–0		4–5	0–0	4–0	2–1	0–0	1–2
Hitome Senbonzakura SUFT (ja)	1–4	0–1	0–0	1–0		0–0	10–1	3–1	4–0	1–2
Michinoku Sendai (ja)	0–5	0–1	2–2	2–1	0–5		7–1	3–3	3–2	1–1
Sendai Sasuke (ja)	0–3	0–5	3–2	0–2	0–4	1–11		1–4	0–5	1–8
Shichigahama SC (ja)	1–6	0–8	2–1	1–1	1–6	1–2	6–3		1–1	3–0
Shichinohe SC (ja)	1–5	0–3	3–0	0–0	0–3	4–4	0–5	0–1		0–1
Sendai University Satellite A (ja)	0–1	1–3	2–1	4–0	1–0	2–2	3–0	3–2	2–0	

Updated to match(es) played on 12 October 2025. Source: Tohoku FA
Legend: Blue = home team win; Yellow = draw; Red = away team win.

==== Division 2 North ====
Pos	Team	Pld	W	D	L	GF	GA	GD	Pts	Qualification or relegation
1	Bogolle D. Tsugaru (ja) (P)	14	11	2	1	44	13	+31	35	Promoted to Tohoku Division 1
2	TDK Shinwakai (ja)	14	8	2	4	37	25	+12	26	
3	Nippon Steel Kamaishi (ja)	14	6	3	5	35	24	+11	21	
4	Ōmiya SC (ja)	14	6	3	5	26	33	−7	21	
5	Saruta Kōgyō	14	4	5	5	24	32	−8	17	
6	Nu Perle Hiraizumi-Maesawa (ja)	14	5	1	8	19	25	−6	16	
7	Ōshū United (ja) (Note: The top teams of the Akita and Iwate prefecture leagues declined to participate in the playoff match, 7th place team, Ōshū United avoided the relegation playoff match and stayed in the Tohoku 2nd Division North.)	14	4	3	7	18	25	−7	15	
8	Akita FC Cambiare (R)	14	1	3	10	20	46	−26	6	Relegated to Akita Prefectural League

Updated to match(es) played on 16 November 2025. Source: Tohoku FA
Rules for classification: 1) Points, 2) Goal difference, 3) Total goals, 4) Head-to-head points, 5) Head-to-head goal difference, 6) Head-to-head goals, 7) Foul points, 8) Lottery
(P) Promoted; (R) Relegated

==== Division 2 South ====
Pos	Team	Pld	W	D	L	GF	GA	GD	Pts	Qualification or relegation
1	Ōyama SC (P)	14	9	5	0	37	10	+27	32	Promoted to Tohoku Division 1
2	Merry (football club) (ja)	14	8	3	3	26	18	+8	27	
3	FC Primeiro Fukushima (ja)	14	7	2	5	36	28	+8	23	
4	FC La U. de Sendai Segunda	14	7	1	6	36	25	+11	22	
5	Iwaki Furukawa FC (ja)	14	5	2	7	21	26	−5	17	
6	Parafrente Yonezawa (ja)	14	5	1	8	19	39	−20	16	
7	RICOH Industry Tohoku (ja) (R)	14	2	5	7	11	24	−13	11	Qualification for a playoff (vs Yamagata Champion).
8	Chaneaule Koriyama (ja) (R)	14	2	3	9	16	32	−16	9	Relegated to Fukushima Prefectural League.

Updated to match(es) played on 16 November 2025. Source: Tohoku FA
Rules for classification: 1) Points, 2) Goal difference, 3) Total goals, 4) Head-to-head points, 5) Head-to-head goal difference, 6) Head-to-head goals, 7) Foul points, 8) Lottery
(P) Promoted; (R) Relegated

==== Promotion Relegation Playoffs ====
December 7, 2025
11:00

RICOH Industry Tohoku (Tohoku Division 2 South 7th)	2-3	Yamagata BB (Yamagata Prefecture League Champion)

Q&A Stadium Miyagi Auxiliary Stadium, Rifu, Miyagi
- Yamagata BB was promoted to the Tohoku 2nd Division South, and the losing team, Ricoh Industry Tohoku was relegated to the Miyagi Prefectural League.

December 7, 2025
13:30

Iris F.C (Miyagi Prefectural League Champion)	14-0	Vioret's Nobuo Dream (Fukushima Prefectural League Champion)

Q&A Stadium Miyagi Auxiliary Stadium, Rifu, Miyagi
- Iris F.C was promoted to Tohoku 2nd Division South.

=== Kantō ===
==== Division 1 ====
This is the 59th edition of the Kanto Soccer League Division 1

Division 1
Pos	Team	Pld	W	D	L	GF	GA	GD	Pts	Qualification or relegation
1	Tokyo United (C, Q)	18	15	1	2	32	13	+19	46	Qualified for the 2025 Regional Champions League
2	Nankatsu SC	18	15	0	3	52	20	+32	45	
3	Toho Titanium	18	10	2	6	25	18	+7	32	
4	Vonds Ichihara (Note: As Shakaijin Cup third place.) (Q, P)	18	9	3	6	19	17	+2	30	Qualified for the 2025 Regional Champions League and promoted to the JFL
5	Nihon University FC (ja)	18	7	3	8	28	37	−9	24	
6	Tokyo 23	18	5	6	7	21	23	−2	21	
7	Toin University of Yokohama (ja)	18	5	4	9	24	31	−7	19	
8	Aries Toshima FC (ja)	18	5	2	11	12	29	−17	17	
9	RKD Ryugasaki (Note: With VONDS Ichihara FC promoted to the JFL, the team in 9th place, which would have faced relegation to the 2nd division, will stay in the 1st division.)	18	4	2	12	22	35	−13	14	
10	Joyful Honda Tsukuba (R)	18	2	3	13	26	38	−12	9	Relegated to Kanto Division 2

Updated to match(es) played on 28 September 2025. Source: GoalNote
Rules for classification: 1) Points; 2) Goal difference; 3) Goals scored
(C) Champions; (P) Promoted; (Q) Qualified for the phase indicated; (R) Relegated

==== Division 2 ====
Division 2
Pos	Team	Pld	W	D	L	GF	GA	GD	Pts	Qualification or relegation
1	Edo All United (ja) (C, P)	18	13	3	2	38	19	+19	42	Promoted to Kanto Division 1
2	Shibuya City (ja) (P)	18	11	5	2	30	15	+15	38	Promoted to Kanto Division 1
3	Tonan Maebashi	18	9	1	8	24	21	+3	28	
4	Hitachi Building System SC (ja)	18	8	4	6	18	16	+2	28	
5	Esperanza SC (ja)	18	7	6	5	21	17	+4	27	
6	Coedo Kawagoe FC (ja)	18	6	6	6	22	17	+5	24	
7	Vertfee Yaita	18	4	5	9	13	21	−8	17	
8	Tokyo International University FC (ja)	18	2	9	7	13	21	−8	15	
9	Atsugi Hayabusa (ja) (Note: With VONDS Ichihara FC promoted to the JFL, the team in 9th place, (Atsugi Hayabusa) which would have been relegated to their prefectural league, will stay in the 2nd division.)	18	4	3	11	16	31	−15	15	
10	Yokohama Takeru (ja) (R)	18	3	4	11	14	31	−17	13	Relegated to Kanagawa Prefectural League

Updated to match(es) played on 28 September 2025. Source: GoalNote
Rules for classification: 1) Points; 2) Goal difference; 3) Goals scored 4) Head-to-head points 5) Head-to-head goal difference 6) Head-to-head goals scored 7) Draw (Lottery)
(C) Champions; (P) Promoted; (R) Relegated

=== Hokushin'etsu ===
==== Division 1 ====
This is the 51st edition of the Hokushin'etsu Football League Division 1

Pos	Team	Pld	W	D	L	GF	GA	GD	Pts	Qualification or relegation
1	Toyama Shinjo (C, Q)	14	11	2	1	39	10	+29	35	Qualified for the 2025 Regional Champions League
2	Fukui United	14	11	1	2	56	9	+47	34	
3	Japan Soccer College	14	9	3	2	39	11	+28	30	
4	Niigata University of Health & Welfare (ja)	14	7	1	6	19	20	−1	22	
5	Artista Asama	14	5	4	5	25	17	+8	19	
6	Niigata University of Management	14	2	3	9	20	44	−24	9	
7	FC Hokuriku (Note: FC Hokuriku was supposed to be relegated to the second division, but NUHW FC, who finished as runners-up in the second division, could not be promoted due to regulations, so FC Hokuriku remained in the first division.)	14	2	2	10	17	33	−16	8	Not relegated (see note)
8	SR Komatsu (ja) (R)	14	1	0	13	4	75	−71	3	Relegated to Hokushin'etsu 2nd Division

Updated to match(es) played on 21 September 2025. Source: GoalNote
Rules for classification: 1) Points; 2) Goal difference; 3) Goals scored 4) Head-to-head records between the teams; a. Points; b. Goal difference; c. Total Score.
(C) Champions; (Q) Qualified for the phase indicated; (R) Relegated

==== Division 2 ====
This is the 22nd edition of the Hokushin'etsu Football League Division 2

Pos	Team	Pld	W	D	L	GF	GA	GD	Pts	Qualification or relegation
1	FC Matsucelona (ja) (C, P)	14	12	2	0	29	8	+21	38	Promoted to Hokushin'etsu Division 1
2	Niigata University H&W FC (ja) (Note: NUHW FC is linked to Niigata University of Health and Welfare FC, currently playing in Division 1. Therefore, they could not be promoted due to tournament regulations and remained in Division 2.)	14	10	3	1	37	9	+28	33	Cannot be promoted (see note)
3	Sakai Phoenix (ja)	14	5	2	7	20	15	+5	17	
4	N-Style Toyama (ja)	14	4	4	6	22	32	−10	16	
5	FC Abies (ja)	14	5	1	8	22	34	−12	16	
6	Kanazawa Gakuin University FC	14	5	0	9	22	28	−6	15	
7	CUPS Seiro (ja)	14	4	1	9	14	29	−15	13	Relegated to Niigata Prefectural League
8	Antelope Shiojiri (ja)	14	3	3	8	19	30	−11	12	Relegated to Nagano Prefectural League

Updated to match(es) played on 21 September 2025. Source: GoalNote
Rules for classification: 1) Points; 2) Goal difference; 3) Goals scored; 4) Head-to-head record between the teams a.) Points; b.) goal difference; c.) Total Score
(C) Champions; (P) Promoted

=== Tōkai ===
==== Division 1 ====
Pos	Team	Pld	W	D	L	GF	GA	GD	Pts	Qualification or relegation
1	Gakunan F. Mosuperio (ja) (C, Q)	14	10	2	2	31	16	+15	32	Qualified for the 2025 Regional Champions League
2	Ise-Shima	14	9	1	4	26	16	+10	28	
3	FC Kariya	14	6	5	3	21	12	+9	23	
4	Fujieda City Hall	14	6	2	6	20	27	−7	20	
5	Chukyo University FC	14	5	4	5	25	21	+4	19	
6	Wyvern FC	14	3	6	5	12	15	−3	15	
7	Vencedor Mie (ja) (R)	14	3	5	6	22	26	−4	14	Relegated to Tōkai Division 2
8	AS Kariya (ja) (R)	14	1	1	12	8	32	−24	4	Relegated to Tōkai Division 2

Updated to match(es) played on 28 September 2025. Source: Tokai SL
Rules for classification: 1) Points; 2) Goal difference; 3) Goals scored 4) Head-to-head record between the teams: 5) Winning percentage (total number of wins ÷ total matches)
(C) Champions; (Q) Qualified for the phase indicated; (R) Relegated
- Due to the relegation of Atlético Suzuka Club from the JFL to the Tokai League 1st Division, the 2026 Tokai 1st Division will be held with 9 teams.

==== Division 2 ====
Pos	Team	Pld	W	D	L	GF	GA	GD	Pts	Qualification or relegation
1	Yazaki Valente (ja) (C, P)	14	11	2	1	27	11	+16	35	Promoted to Tokai Division 1
2	Tokai FC (ja) (P)	14	8	1	5	30	15	+15	25	Promoted to Tokai Division 1
3	Sports & Society Izu (ja)	14	7	4	3	21	14	+7	25	
4	Rajil FC Higashi-Mikawa (ja)	14	6	0	8	20	23	−3	18	
5	FC Gifu Second (ja)	14	6	0	8	17	21	−4	18	
6	Tokai Gakuen University FC (ja)	14	5	2	7	25	28	−3	17	
7	Chukyo University FC (ja) (R)	14	3	4	7	14	25	−11	13	Relegated to Aichi Prefectural League
8	Nagoya SC (R)	14	3	1	10	11	28	−17	10	Relegated to Aichi Prefectural League

Updated to match(es) played on 26 October 2025. Source: Tokai SL
Rules for classification: 1) Points; 2) Goal difference; 3) Goals scored 4) Head-to-head record between the teams: 5) Winning percentage (total number of wins ÷ total matches)
(C) Champions; (P) Promoted; (R) Relegated

=== Kansai ===
==== Division 1 ====
- Asuka FC was relegated from the Japan Football League (JFL) to the Kansai League, and since there was no promotion from the Kansai League to the JFL, the relegation spots from the 1st division increased by one, meaning 6th place was also demoted to the 2nd division. Similarly, the relegation spots from the 2nd division increased by one, with 7th place dropping to the prefectural league and 6th place entering the replacement match.

Pos	Team	Pld	W	D	L	GF	GA	GD	Pts	Qualification or relegation
1	Arterivo Wakayama (C, Q)	14	10	2	2	33	7	+26	32	Qualified for the 2025 Regional Champions League
2	FC Basara Hyogo (ja) (Note: As Shakaijin Cup Runners Up.) (Q)	14	10	2	2	34	9	+25	32	Qualified for the 2025 Regional Champions League
3	Cento Cuore Harima	14	4	8	2	18	11	+7	20	
4	Laranja Kyoto	14	5	4	5	20	21	−1	19	
5	Moriyama Samurai 2000 (ja)	14	4	6	4	13	12	+1	18	
6	Velago Ikoma (ja)	14	3	7	4	20	17	+3	16	
7	FC AWJ (ja) (R)	14	4	3	7	16	21	−5	15	Relegated to Kansai Division 2
8	Kobe FC 1970 (ja) (R)	14	0	0	14	4	60	−56	0	Relegated to Kansai Division 2

Updated to match(es) played on unknown. Source: GoalNote
Rules for classification: 1) Points; 2) Goal difference; 3) Goals scored 4) Head-to-head records between the teams; a. Points; b. goal difference; c. Total Score.
(C) Champions; (Q) Qualified for the phase indicated; (R) Relegated

==== Division 2 ====
This is the 21st edition of the Kansai Football League Division 2

Pos	Team	Pld	W	D	L	GF	GA	GD	Pts	Qualification or relegation
1	Ococias Kyoto (C, P)	14	11	1	2	29	15	+14	34	Promoted to Division 1
2	Kansai FC 2008 (ja)	14	9	2	3	30	15	+15	29	
3	AC Middlerange (ja)	14	8	2	4	26	13	+13	26	
4	Hannan University Soccer Club (ja)	14	7	1	6	36	26	+10	22	
5	Route 11 (ja)	14	6	2	6	33	30	+3	20	
6	St. Andrew's FC (ja) (R)	14	3	2	9	19	39	−20	11	Qualified for a play-off match. (vs 2nd place in the prefectural finals), lost and were relegated to Osaka Prefectural League.
7	Kyoto Shiko SC (ja) (R)	14	3	1	10	21	37	−16	10	Relegated to Kyoto Prefectural League.
8	Osaka Korean FC (ja) (R)	14	2	3	9	14	33	−19	9	Relegated to Osaka Prefectural League.

Updated to match(es) played on 21 September 2025. Source: GoalNote
Rules for classification: 1) Points; 2) Goal difference; 3) Goals scored 4) Head-to-head records between the teams; a. Points; b. Goal difference; c. Total score. 5) Discipline
(C) Champions; (P) Promoted; (R) Relegated

==== Promotion Relegation Playoff ====
January 17, 2026
13:00

St. Andrew's FC (ja) (6th place in the 2nd division)	1 - 2	Osaka City SC (2nd place in the prefectural finals)
	Report

Expo '70 Commemorative Stadium, Suita, Osaka
Attendance: 130
Referee: Tomoto Mitsuda
- Osaka City SC were promoted to the 2nd division, while St. Andrew's FC were relegated to the Osaka Prefectural League.

=== Chūgoku ===
This is the 53rd edition of the Chūgoku Football League.

Pos	Team	Pld	W	D	L	GF	GA	GD	Pts	Qualification or relegation
1	Fukuyama City (C, Q)	18	16	1	1	68	6	+62	49	Qualified for the 2025 Regional Champions League
2	Belugarosso Iwami	18	11	5	2	45	11	+34	38	
3	International Pacific Univ. FC	18	11	3	4	42	19	+23	36	
4	Yonago Genki SC (ja)	18	8	3	7	22	26	−4	27	
5	Hatsukaichi FC (ja)	18	8	3	7	24	32	−8	27	
6	Baleine Shimonoseki	18	7	3	8	29	28	+1	24	
7	SRC Hiroshima	18	7	2	9	24	26	−2	23	
8	Mitsubishi Mizushima	18	6	3	9	25	29	−4	21	
9	ENEOS Mizushima (ja) (O)	18	2	1	15	15	40	−25	7	Qualified for playoff vs SC Tottori Dreams and remained in this league for 2026.
10	Banmel Tottori (ja) (R)	18	2	0	16	13	90	−77	6	Relegated to Tottori Prefectural League

Updated to match(es) played on 23 October 2025.. Source: Chūgoku Soccer League
Rules for classification: 1) Points; 2) Goal difference; 3) Goals scored
(C) Champions; (O) Play-off winners; (Q) Qualified for the phase indicated; (R) Relegated

==== Promotion/relegation playoff ====
December 7th, 2025
14:30

ENEOS Mizushima (ja) (Chugoku Football League 9th place)	3–0	SC Tottori Dreams (Chugoku Regional League Promotion Championship runner-up)

IPU, Pacific Rim University Seto Ground
- ENEOS Mizushima won, therefore stayed in the Chūgoku league.

=== Shikoku ===
Pos	Team	Pld	W	D	L	GF	GA	GD	Pts	Qualification or relegation
1	FC Tokushima (C, Q)	14	14	0	0	65	9	+56	42	Qualified for the 2025 Regional Champions League
2	SONIO Takamatsu (ja)	14	9	0	5	36	17	+19	27	
3	Tadotsu FC (ja)	14	8	2	4	27	21	+6	26	
4	Lvnirosso NC (ja)	14	5	2	7	22	30	−8	17	
5	Llamas Kochi (ja)	14	5	2	7	18	26	−8	17	
6	Alverio Takamatsu (ja)	14	5	0	9	20	25	−5	15	
7	KUFC Nankoku (ja) (O)	14	3	3	8	13	24	−11	12	Qualified for the play-off match (vs Shikoku Challenge 2nd place team).
8	YFC Shikoku Chuo (ja) (R)	14	2	1	11	6	55	−49	7	Relegated to Ehime Prefectural League

Updated to match(es) played on 21 September 2025. Source: GoalNote
Rules for classification: 1) Points; 2) Goal difference; 3) Goals scored
(C) Champions; (O) Play-off winners; (Q) Qualified for the phase indicated; (R) Relegated

==== Results ====
Home \ Away	Alverio Takamatsu (ALT)	KUF	Llamas Kochi (LLA)	Lvnirosso NC (LVN)	Sonio Takamatsu (SON)	Tadotsu FC (TAD)	TOK	YFC Shikoku Chuo (YFC)
Alverio Takamatsu (ja)		2–1	3–5	1–2	0–1	2–3	1–6	3–0
KUFC Nankoku	1–0		0–1	2–1	1–2	1–1	0–1	1–1
Llamas Kochi (ja)	1–2	1–2		1–1	0–2	0–0	0–6	3–0
Lvnirosso NC (ja)	1–0	1–1	5–1		3–2	0–1	1–2	5–0
Sonio Takamatsu (ja)	0–2	2–1	2–1	8–0		2–1	2–4	7–0
Tadotsu FC (ja)	2–0	1–0	0–1	2–1	3–2		1–2	6–0
FC Tokushima	2–1	8–1	3–0	7–1	1–0	9–2		8–0
YFC Shikoku Chuo (ja)	0–4	2–1	0–3	2–0	0–4	1–4	0–6	

Updated to match(es) played on 21 September 2025. Source: GoalNote
Legend: Blue = home team win; Yellow = draw; Red = away team win.

==== Promotion/relegation playoff ====
18 January 2026
13:00

KUFC Nankoku （Shikoku Football League 7th place）	0–1	Hisaeda FC (Shikoku Football League Promotion Championship runner-up)

Sports Park Sakawa
25 January 2026
13:00

Hisaeda FC	1–4	KUFC Nankoku

Hojo Sports Center Ball Stadium
- Both teams had one win and one loss, so as a result of double the away goals and recalculation according to the regulations, KUFC Nangoku won 8-3 on aggregate.

=== Kyushu ===
This is the 53rd edition of the Kyushu Soccer League.

Pos	Team	Pld	W	D	L	GF	GA	GD	Pts	Qualification or relegation
1	J-Lease (C, P)	18	15	2	1	58	15	+43	47	Qualified for the 2025 Regional Champions League
2	Veroskronos Tsuno (Note: As Shakaijin Cup champions.) (Q)	18	14	1	3	64	13	+51	43	Qualified for the 2025 Regional Champions League
3	Nobeoka Agata	18	13	4	1	49	13	+36	43	
4	KMG Holdings (ja)	18	10	4	4	33	29	+4	34	
5	Mitsubishi HI Nagasaki SC (ja)	18	6	5	7	28	38	−10	23	
6	Brew Saga	18	5	3	10	22	32	−10	18	
7	Kawasoe Club (ja)	18	5	2	11	22	49	−27	17	
8	Nippon Steel Oita SC (ja)	18	5	1	12	23	42	−19	16	
9	NIFS Kanoya FC (ja) (Note: With J-Lease FC moving up to the JFL, the 9th-place team will stay in the Kyushu League without a play-off, and the top two teams from the Kyushu Prefectural League Finals will now be automatically promoted.)	18	4	2	12	23	42	−19	14	
10	FC Hakata (ja) (R)	18	0	2	16	5	54	−49	2	Relegated to Fukuoka Prefectural League

Updated to match(es) played on 7 September 2025. Source: Kyushu Soccer League
Rules for classification: 1) Points; 2) Goal difference; 3) Goals scored; 4) Head-to-head points; 5) Head-to-head goal difference; 6) Head-to-head goals
(C) Champions; (P) Promoted; (Q) Qualified for the phase indicated; (R) Relegated

==== Results ====
Home \ Away	BRE	FC Hakata (HAK)	JLE	Mitsubishi HI Nagasaki SC (MHI)	KAN	Kawasoe Club (KAW)	KMG Holdings FC (KMG)	NOB	Nippon Steel Oita SC (NSO)	VER
Brew Saga		4–0	0–5	1–1	1–0	1–1	0–1	0–3	1–3	0–1
FC Hakata (ja)	1–5		1–7	1–4	0–0	0–2	1–3	0–4	0–4	0–5
J-Lease FC	3–1	3–1		2–0	3–2	8–0	6–1	3–3	3–2	2–1
Mitsubishi HI Nagasaki SC (ja)	2–2	2–0	0–3		3–1	2–1	2–2	0–0	1–2	0–5
NIFS Kanoya FC	3–1	2–0	0–2	2–1		3–3	1–2	0–6	4–0	0–4
Kawasoe Club (ja)	1–2	1–0	0–3	0–1	2–1		2–5	0–1	3–2	1–8
KMG Holdings FC (ja)	1–0	0–0	2–2	2–2	3–2	3–2		0–3	4–1	2–1
Nobeoka Agata	3–0	3–0	1–0	5–1	5–1	1–0	3–1		4–1	0–2
Nippon Steel Oita SC (ja)	0–2	2–0	0–1	1–5	1–0	0–2	0–1	3–3		0–4
Veroskronos Tsuno	3–1	3–0	0–2	8–1	5–1	8–1	1–0	1–1	4–1	

Updated to match(es) played on 7 September 2025. Source: Kyushu Soccer League, Soccerway
Legend: Blue = home team win; Yellow = draw; Red = away team win.
