= Takuya Shimamura =

Japanese footballer

Takuya Shimamura 島村 拓弥
Personal information
- Full name: Takuya Shimamura
- Date of birth: March 6, 1999 (age 27)
- Place of birth: Bizen, Okayama, Japan
- Height: 1.70 m (5 ft 7 in)
- Positions: Midfielder; left back

Team information
- Current team: Yokohama FC (on loan from Kashiwa Reysol)
- Number: 18

Youth career
- Ota FC
- Saude FC
- 2014–2016: Kyoto Sanga

Senior career*
| Years | Team | Apps | (Gls) |
| 2017–2020 | Kyoto Sanga | 0 | (0) |
| 2018 | → FC Gifu (loan) | 4 | (0) |
| 2019 | → Londrina (loan) | 0 | (0) |
| 2020 | → Cerezo Osaka U-23 (loan) | 30 | (0) |
| 2021–2023 | FC Imabari | 48 | (1) |
| 2023 | Roasso Kumamoto | 29 | (2) |
| 2024– | Kashiwa Reysol | 29 | (3) |
| 2025–2026 | → Albirex Niigata (loan) | 24 | (1) |
| 2026– | → Yokohama FC (loan) | 1 | (0) |
- * Club domestic league appearances and goals as of 14 August 2026

Takuya Shimamura (島村 拓弥, Shimamura Takuya; born March 6, 1999) is a Japanese football player for Yokohama FC, on loan from Kashiwa Reysol.

== Career ==
After being raised by Kyoto Sanga youth ranks, Shimamura was promoted to the top team in November 2016; after one season, he was loaned to FC Gifu. On 12 February 2019, Brazilian club Londrina announced, that they had loaned Shimamura and his teammate Kota Ogino. During his time at Londrina, Shimamura didn't play any games for the first team but mostly for the U19s.

On 29 January 2020, Shimamura joined Cerezo Osaka on loan.

== Club statistics ==
Updated to 30 August 2018.

| Club performance | | | League | | Cup | | Total | |
| Season | Club | League | Apps | Goals | Apps | Goals | Apps | Goals |
| Japan | | | League | | Emperor's Cup | | Total | |
|---|---|---|---|---|---|---|---|---|
| 2017 | Kyoto Sanga | J2 League | 0 | 0 | 0 | 0 | 0 | 0 |
| 2018 | FC Gifu | J2 League | 2 | 0 | 0 | 0 | 2 | 0 |
| Total | | | 2 | 0 | 0 | 0 | 2 | 0 |
