= Kota Ogino =

Japanese footballer

Kota Ogino 荻野 広大
Personal information
- Full name: Kota Ogino
- Date of birth: May 2, 1997 (age 29)
- Place of birth: Yamashina-ku, Kyoto, Japan
- Height: 1.82 m (5 ft 11 1/2 in)
- Position: Midfielder

Team information
- Current team: J-Lease FC
- Number: 11

Youth career
- 2013–2015: Kyoto Sanga

Senior career*
Years	Team	Apps	(Gls)
2015–2020	Kyoto Sanga	0	(0)
2016–2017	→ Kamatamare Sanuki (loan)	13	(0)
2018	→ Tegevajaro Miyazaki (loan)	3	(0)
2019	→ Londrina (loan)	0	(0)
2020	→ Veertien Mie (loan)		
2021–	J-Lease FC	17	(7)
- * Club domestic league appearances and goals as of 18:25, 26 September 2021 (UTC)

Kota Ogino (荻野 広大, Ogino Kōta; born May 2, 1997) is a Japanese football player. Kyushu Soccer League club J-Lease FC

== Career ==
Kota Ogino joined J2 League club Kyoto Sanga FC in 2016. In July, he moved to Kamatamare Sanuki. On 12 February 2019, Brazilian club Londrina announced, that they had loaned Ogino and his teammate Takuya Shimamura.

On 13 February 2021, Ogino moved to Kyushu Soccer League club J-Lease FC.

== Club statistics ==
Updated to 22 February 2018.

Club performance			League		Cup		Total	
Season	Club	League	Apps	Goals	Apps	Goals	Apps	Goals
Japan			League		Emperor's Cup		Total	
2015	Kyoto Sanga	J2 League	0	0	3	0	3	0
2016	Kyoto Sanga	J2 League	0	0	0	0	0	0
2016	Kamatamare Sanuki	J2 League	10	0	1	0	11	0
2017	Kamatamare Sanuki	J2 League	3	0	0	0	3	0
Total			13	0	4	0	17	0
