= Takayuki Takayasu =

Japanese footballer (born 2001)

Takayuki Takayasu 高安 孝幸
Personal information
- Date of birth: 25 September 2001 (age 25)
- Place of birth: Naha, Okinawa, Japan
- Height: 1.76 m (5 ft 9 in)
- Position: Defender

Team information
- Current team: J-Lease
- Number: 13

Youth career
- Mekaru FC
- –2012: FC Ryukyu
- 2013–2015: Yasuoka Junior High School
- 2016–2018: Kokoku High School

Senior career*
Years	Team	Apps	(Gls)
2019–2022	Zweigen Kanazawa	56	(0)
2023–2024	FC Ryukyu	53	(3)
2025–	J-Lease		
- * Club domestic league appearances and goals as of 16 November 2024

Takayuki Takayasu (高安 孝幸, Takayasu Takayuki; born 25 September 2001) is a Japanese professional footballer who plays as a defender for fifth-tier Kyushu Soccer League club J-Lease.

== Career ==
Takayasu begin first youth career with Mekaru FC, FC Ryukyu, Yasuoka Junior High School and Kokoku High School until he was graduation in 2018.

In June 2019, Takayasu begin first professional career with Zweigen Kanazawa from 2020 season, approved as a special designated player in September of the same year. On 24 November at same year, he debuted as professional career with his club at Final match against Omiya Ardija in J2 League Matchweek 42.

The opportunity to participate in the 2022 season was limited to 5 league games and On 21 October of the same year, he was announced that the contract would expire and the contract would not be renewed before the final game.

On 7 December at same year, Takayasu announcement officially transfer to J3 relegated club and former youth team, FC Ryukyu for upcoming 2023 season.

== Career statistics ==
Updated to the end 2022 season.

Club performance			League		Cup		League Cup		Continental		Total	
Season	Club	League	Apps	Goals	Apps	Goals	Apps	Goals	Apps	Goals	Apps	Goals
Japan			League		Emperor's Cup		J. League Cup		Asia		Total	
2019	Zweigen Kanazawa	J2 League	1	0	0	0	0	0	0	0	1	0
2020	Zweigen Kanazawa	J2 League	33	0	0	0	0	0	0	0	33	0
2021	Zweigen Kanazawa	J2 League	17	0	1	0	0	0	0	0	18	0
2022	Zweigen Kanazawa	J2 League	5	0	1	0	0	0	0	0	6	0
2023	FC Ryukyu	J3 League	0	0	0	0	0	0	0	0	0	0
Career total			56	0	2	0	0	0	0	0	58	0
