= Takuma Sonoda =

Japanese footballer (born 1993)

Takuma Sonoda 薗田 卓馬
Personal information
- Full name: Takuma Sonoda
- Date of birth: 14 June 1993 (age 33)
- Place of birth: Kirishima, Kagoshima, Japan
- Height: 1.78 m (5 ft 10 in)
- Position: Forward

Team information
- Current team: J-Lease FC

Youth career
- 2006–2008: Kagoshima Ikueikan Jr. High School
- 2009–2011: Kagoshima Josei High School

College career
Years	Team	Apps	(Gls)
2012–2015	Fukuoka University		

Senior career*
Years	Team	Apps	(Gls)
2016–2017	Azul Claro Numazu	62	(31)
2018	Tokushima Vortis	1	(0)
2018	→ Kagoshima United FC (loan)	15	(4)
2019–2021	Kagoshima United FC	55	(8)
2022	Tegevajaro Miyazaki	29	(6)
2023–	J-Lease FC	0	(0)
- * Club domestic league appearances and goals as of 29 December 2022, 0:20 (UTC)

Takuma Sonoda (薗田 卓馬, Sonoda Takuma; born June 14, 1993) is a Japanese football player for J-Lease FC from 2023.

== Career ==
On 6 January 2022, Tegevajaro Miyazaki confirmed Sonoda as a new signing for the J3 season, coming from Kagoshima United FC.

On 29 December of the same year, Sonoda was officially transferred to J-Lease FC to play on the Kyushu Soccer League for the upcoming 2023 season.

== Club statistics ==
Updated to the end 2022 season.

Club performance			League		Cup		Total	
Season	Club	League	Apps	Goals	Apps	Goals	Apps	Goals
Japan			League		Emperor's Cup		Total	
2016	Azul Claro Numazu	JFL	30	12	–		30	12
2017	Azul Claro Numazu	J3 League	32	19	2	1	34	20
2018	Tokushima Vortis	J2 League	1	0	1	0	2	0
2018	Kagoshima United FC	J3 League	15	4	0	0	15	4
2019	Kagoshima United FC	J2 League	11	0	1	0	12	0
2020	Tegevajaro Miyazaki	J3 League	24	6	0	0	24	6
2021	Tegevajaro Miyazaki	J3 League	20	2	1	0	21	2
2022	Tegevajaro Miyazaki	J3 League	29	6	0	0	29	6
2023	J-Lease FC	Japanese Regional Leagues	0	0	0	0	0	0
Career total			162	49	5	1	167	50
