= Tomoki Fujisaki =

Japanese footballer

Tomoki Fujisaki 藤嵜 智貴
Personal information
- Full name: Tomoki Fujisaki
- Date of birth: September 19, 1994 (age 32)
- Place of birth: Chiba, Japan
- Height: 1.77 m (5 ft 9 1/2 in)
- Position: Defender

Team information
- Current team: Vanraure Hachinohe
- Number: 2

Youth career
- 2010–2012: Shimizu S-Pulse Youth
- 2013–2016: Kokushikan University

Senior career*
Years	Team	Apps	(Gls)
2017–2022	Azul Claro Numazu	41	(3)
2023–	Vanraure Hachinohe	0	(0)
- * Club domestic league appearances and goals as of 23 July 2020

Tomoki Fujisaki (藤嵜 智貴, Fujisaki Tomoki; born September, 1994) is a Japanese football player. He plays for Vanraure Hachinohe.

== Career ==
Tomoki Fujisaki joined J3 League club Azul Claro Numazu in 2017.

== Club statistics ==
Updated to 22 February 2018.

Appearances and goals by club, season and competition
Club	Season	League			Emperor's Cup		Total	
Club	Season	Division	Apps	Goals	Apps	Goals	Apps	Goals
Azul Claro Numazu|	2017	J3 League	12	0	2	0	14	0
Total			12	0	2	0	14	0
