= Technoport Fukui Stadium =

Baseball stadium in Sakai, Fukui, Japan

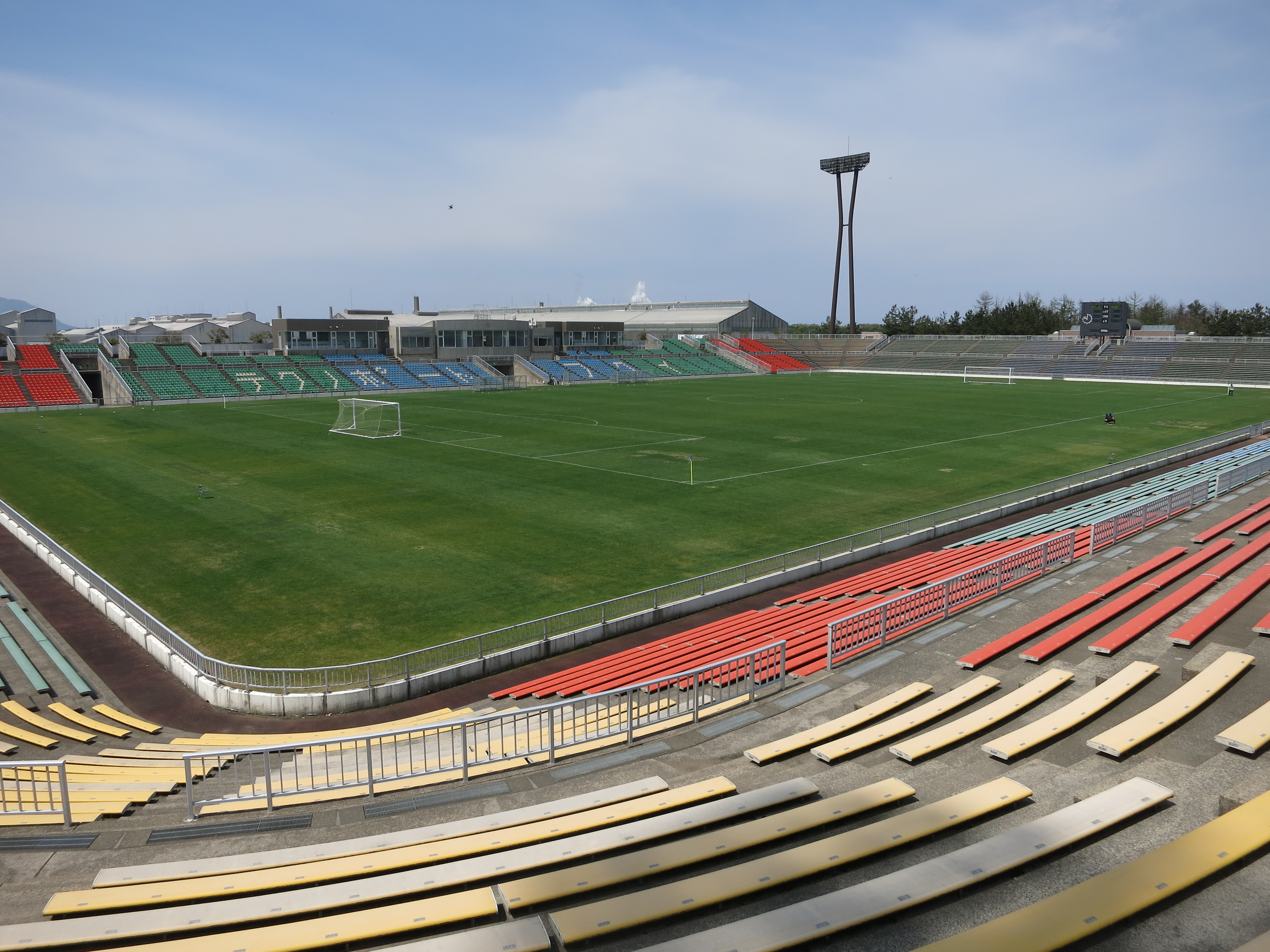
- Interactive map of Technoport Fukui Stadium
- Location: Sakai, Fukui, Japan
- Coordinates: 36°11′15.4″N 136°7′52.8″E
- Owner: Fukui Prefecture
- Capacity: 21,053

Construction
- Opened: 1994

Website
- https://www.technoportfukui.info//スタジアム/

Technoport Fukui Stadium (テクノポート福井スタジアム) is a baseball stadium in Sakai, Fukui, Japan.

As a stadium exclusively for baseball games, it is the largest in the Hokuriku region. The pitch size is 160 m × 95 m. The main stand has 4,046 individual seats plus four handicapped seats, the back stand has 6,160 individual seats and the side stands have 10,833 seats bench seats. There is no roof over the stands.

Although designed for baseball, the stadium is also used for numerous soccer events.

== Images ==
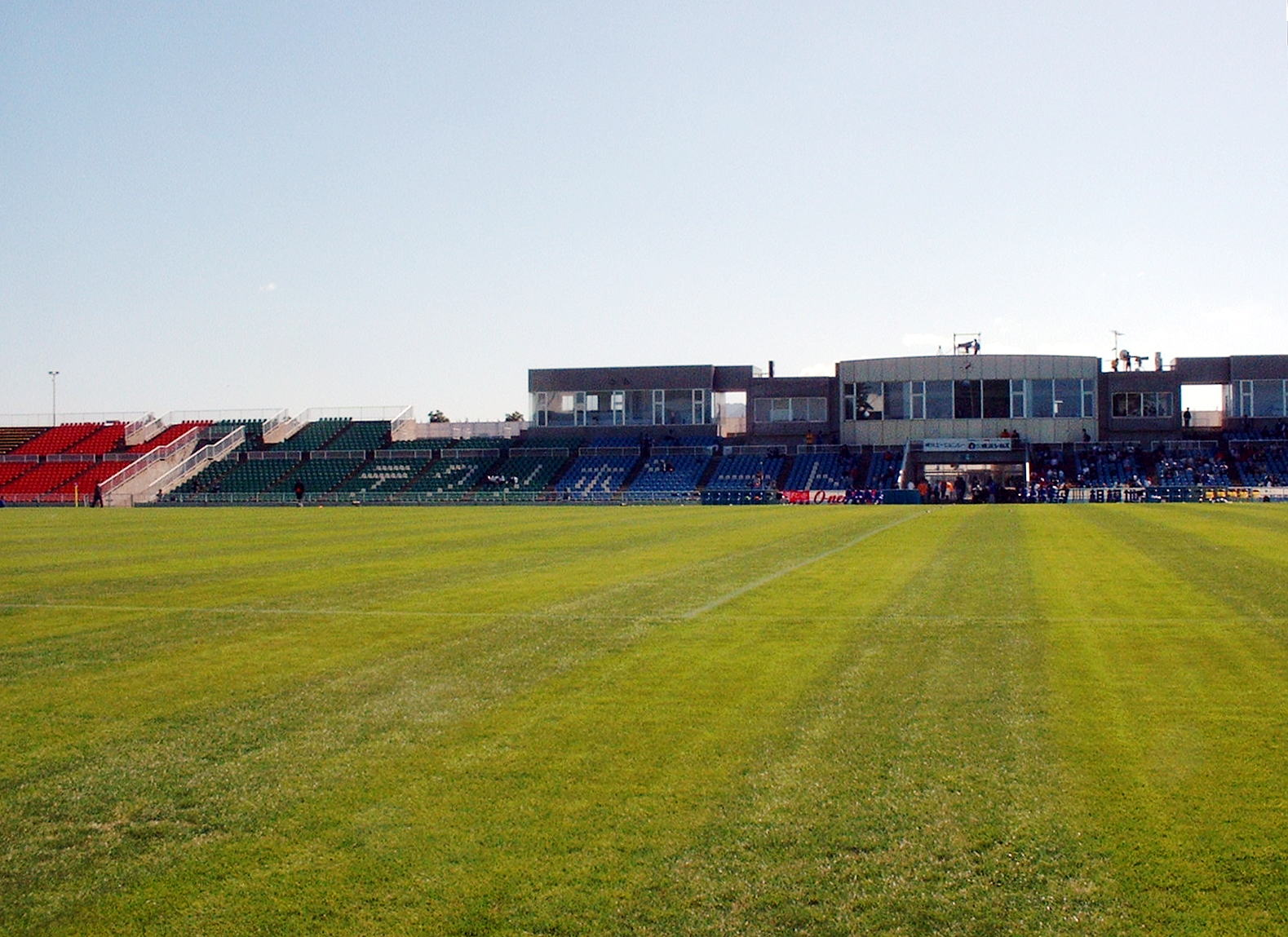
In 2001

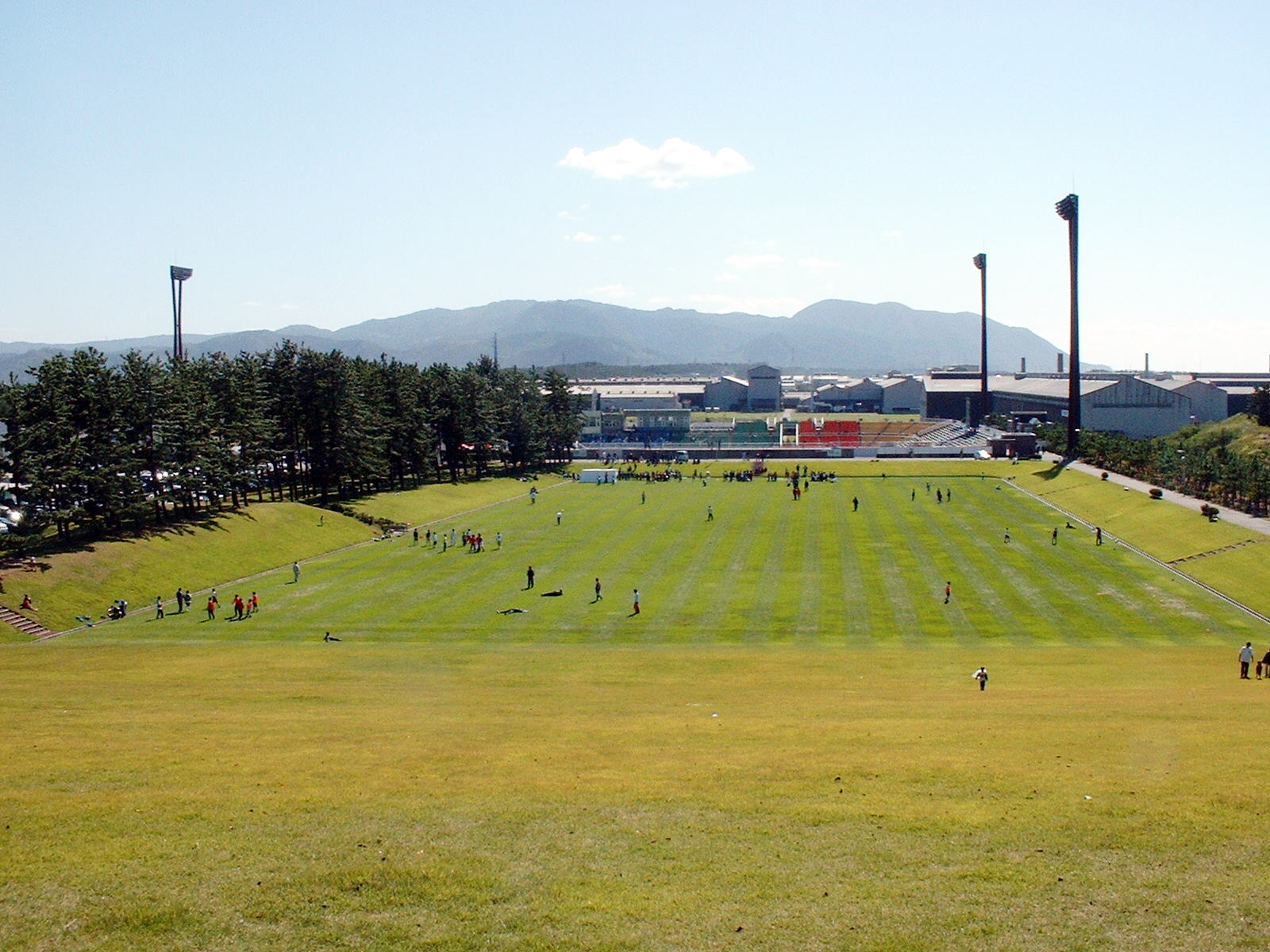
In 2001

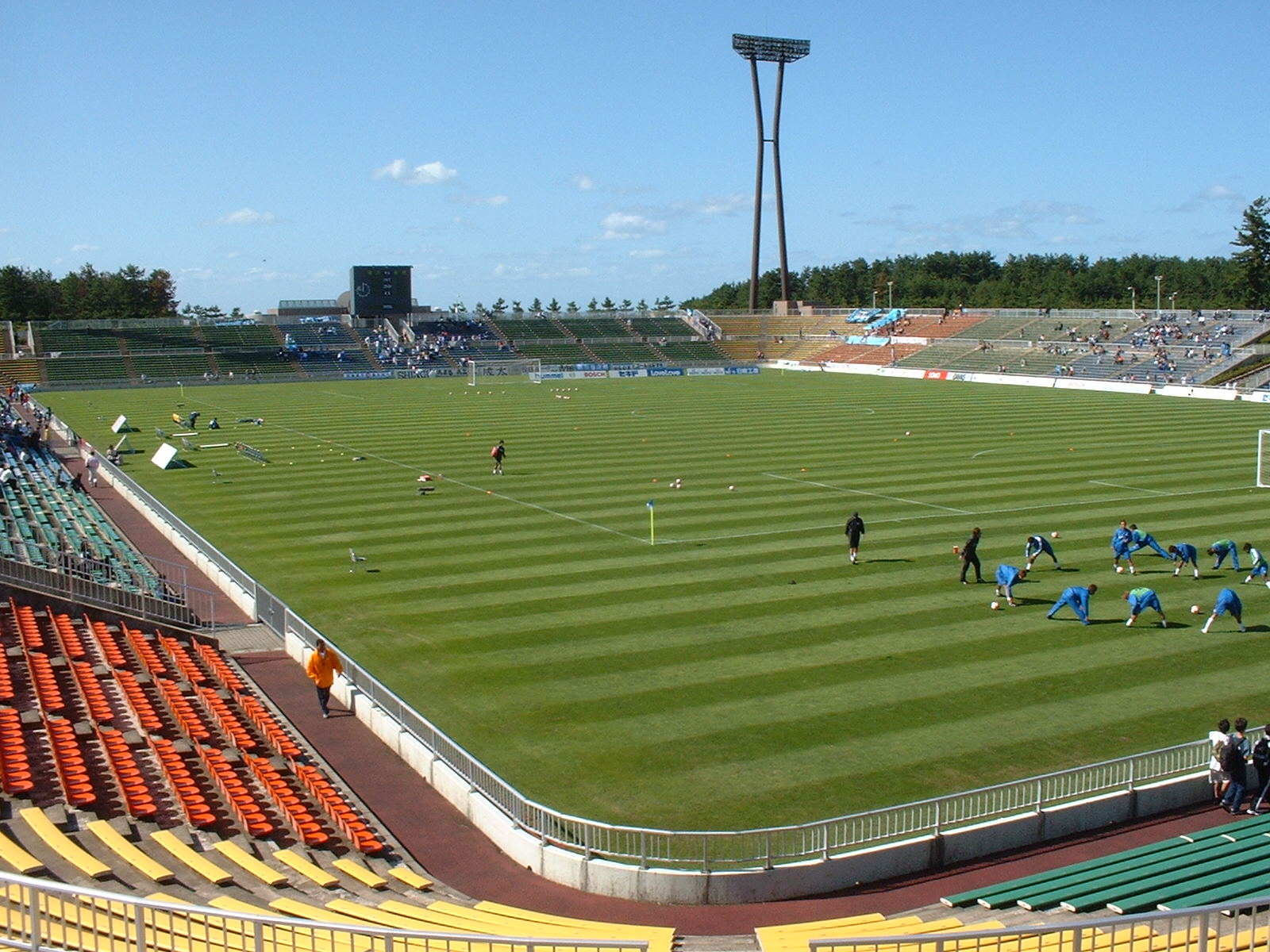
In 2001
