= Daiki Deoka =

Japanese footballer

Daiki Deoka 出岡 大輝
Personal information
- Full name: Daiki Deoka
- Date of birth: August 16, 1994 (age 32)
- Place of birth: Osaka, Japan
- Height: 1.79 m (5 ft 10 1/2 in)
- Position: Midfielder

Team information
- Current team: Fujieda MYFC
- Number: 27

Youth career
- 2010–2012: Gamba Osaka

College career
Years	Team	Apps	(Gls)
2013–2016	Kwansei Gakuin University		

Senior career*
Years	Team	Apps	(Gls)
2017–2018	Thespakusatsu Gunma	14	(0)
2018	→ Fujieda MYFC (loan)	6	(0)
2019–	Fujieda MYFC		
- * Club domestic league appearances and goals as of 22 February 2019

Daiki Deoka (出岡 大輝, Deoka Daiki; born August 16, 1994) is a Japanese football player. He plays for Fujieda MYFC.

== Career ==
Daiki Deoka joined J2 League club Thespakusatsu Gunma in 2017.

== Club statistics ==
Updated to 22 February 2019.

Club performance			League		Cup		Total	
Season	Club	League	Apps	Goals	Apps	Goals	Apps	Goals
Japan			League		Emperor's Cup		Total	
2017	Thespakusatsu Gunma	J2 League	14	0	2	0	16	0
2018	Thespakusatsu Gunma	J3 League	0	0	0	0	0	0
2018	Fujieda MYFC	J3 League	6	0	0	0	6	0
Total			20	0	2	0	22	0
