= FC Tokushima =

Japanese football club

FC Tokushima FC徳島
- Full name: Football Club Tokushima
- Founded: 2003; 23 years ago as Celeste FC; 2016; 10 years ago as FC Tokushima Celeste; 2018; 8 years ago as FC Tokushima
- Ground: Yokota Kamizakura Sports Ground; Tokushima Football Field; Pocarisweat Stadium; Tokushima Sports Village (Tokushima)
- Capacity: 200 (Yokota KSG); 13,000 (Tokushima FF); 5,600 (Pocarisweat ST); 2,200 (Tokushima SV)
- Owner(s): Fortua Co., Ltd.
- Manager: Toshiaki Haji
- League: Shikoku Soccer League
- 2025: 1st of 8, Champions
- Website: fctokushima2016.com

FC Tokushima (FC徳島, Efu Shi Tokushima) are a Japanese football club based in Yoshinogawa, Tokushima. They currently play in the Shikoku Soccer League, which part of Japanese Regional Leagues.

== History ==
The club was founded on 2003 as Celeste FC. It didn't take long for the club to gain promotion to the Tokushima Prefectural League 1st division, this occurred in 2006. Since then, the club never went back to the 2nd division. On 2012, after winning the Tokushima Prefectural League, Celeste FC qualified to the Shikoku Prefectural League Final Tournament, facing the other 3 prefectural championships winners of Ehime, Kochi, and Kagawa, as the four prefectures comprises the Shikoku region. The club won the tournament, therefore, getting promoted to the Shikoku Soccer League.

In 2013, their unsuccessful debut at the regional league level, led the club to get relegated back to the Tokushima Prefectural League. As quick it took to get relegated, they got promoted back to the Shikoku League for the 2016 season. From 2016 onwards, Celeste FC change name to FC Tokushima Celeste representing Tokushima, the club never again got relegated, and won qualification to the Emperor's Cup as Tokushima representatives every year since then.

In 2018, the club change name again to FC Tokushima due to Celeste lost name club.

The club had two previous opportunities to play in the Regional Champions League, a tournament that can potentially give an opportunity for Regional League clubs to get promoted to the Japan Football League. Debuting at the competition in 2019, the club finished as the second-bottom club in an overall ranking, as they lost all the three matches in which they played on the first stage.

FC Tokushima won the 2020 Shikoku Soccer League, giving them the right to participate for their second time in the competition. However, the 2020 season of the Regional Champions League was cancelled due to the COVID-19 pandemic, then, delaying their second appearance at the competition, which would happen on the 2021.

In this 2021 edition, they qualified from the first stage, going through unbeaten after three matches, winning two matches and drawing the other game. However, in the second and final stage of the competition, they finished as the bottom-placed team of the group, losing all three matches, ending up as the competition's 4th-placed team. It is, to date, their highest placement in the competition so far, as they failed to reach such heights in their next attempts.

== Current squad ==
As of 24 September 2026.

Note: Flags indicate national team as defined under FIFA eligibility rules; some limited exceptions apply. Players may hold more than one non-FIFA nationality.

No.	Pos.	Nation	Player
1	GK	JPN	Kamui Ohata
3	DF	JPN	Ryota Tominaga
4	MF	JPN	Ko Nakajima
5	DF	JPN	Hiroto Kurakazu
6	MF	JPN	Chikara Tashiro
7	FW	JPN	Daiki Deoka
8	MF	JPN	Kodai Himeda
9	MF	JPN	Tatsuki Higashiyama
10	FW	JPN	Shirya Fujiwara
11	MF	JPN	Yuta Taniyama

No.	Pos.	Nation	Player
13	DF	JPN	Masato Abe
15	DF	JPN	Ibuki Matsushita (on loan from Yokohama FC)
16	MF	JPN	Taiou Takata
18	FW	JPN	Glory Nagashima (on loan from Tsukuba FC)
19	MF	JPN	Yuei Iwasaki
21	GK	JPN	Takuto Kimura
23	GK	JPN	Kenichiro Kaneda
30	MF	JPN	Umi Kawamoto
88	MF	JPN	Mashu Sada

== Coaching staff ==
Position	Staff
Manager	(Japan) Toshiaki Haji
General manager	(Japan) Kihiro Nitta
Goalkeeper coach	(Japan) Fumiya Nagai
Trainer	(Japan) Takahiro Nomura
Staff manager	(Japan) Ryuwa Nakagawa
Side staff	(Japan) Kosuke Inai

== League and Cup record ==
Champions	Runners-up	Third place	Promoted	Relegated

League											Emperor's Cup
Season	Division	Pos.	P	W	D	L	F	A	GD	Pts	Emperor's Cup
Celeste
2007	Tokushima Pref. League	7th	11	4	3	4	27	25	2	15	–
2008	Tokushima Pref. League	9th	10	3	0	7	18	36	-18	9	–
2009	Tokushima Pref. League	2nd	11	6	3	2	23	15	8	21	–
2010	Tokushima Pref. League	5th	10	4	3	3	18	36	-18	15	–
2011	Tokushima Pref. League	4th	11	8	2	1	18	36	-18	20 (Note: 6 points were deducted by the Shikoku FA)	–
2012	Tokushima Pref. League	1st	11	10	1	0	41	12	29	31	–
2013	Shikoku Soccer League	8th	14	2	0	12	18	70	-52	6	–
2014	Tokushima Pref. League	8th	11	3	2	6	15	22	-7	11	–
2015	Tokushima Pref. League	1st	11	10	0	1	43	9	34	30	–
FC Tokushima Celeste
2016	Shikoku Soccer League	5th	14	4	1	9	12	45	-33	13	1st round
2017	Shikoku Soccer League	2nd	14	9	4	1	41	13	28	31	1st round
FC Tokushima
2018	Shikoku Soccer League	2nd	14	10	3	1	55	11	44	33	1st round
2019	Shikoku Soccer League	2nd	14	12	0	2	49	11	38	36	1st round
2020	Shikoku Soccer League	1st	7	7	0	0	29	3	26	21	3rd round
2021	Shikoku Soccer League	Cancelled due to the COVID-19 pandemic									1st round
2022	Shikoku Soccer League	1st	14	13	1	0	66	8	56	37	1st round
2023	Shikoku Soccer League	1st	14	11	3	0	70	11	59	36	2nd round
2024	Shikoku Soccer League	1st	14	13	0	1	73	14	59	39	1st round
2025	Shikoku Soccer League	1st	14	14	0	0	65	9	56	42	1st round
2026	Shikoku Soccer League	TBD	14	0	0	0	0	0	0	0	TBD

Key

- Pos. = Position in league; P = Games played; W = Games won; D = Games drawn; L = Games lost; F = Goals scored; A = Goals conceded; GD = Goal difference; Pts = Points won

== Honours ==
FC Tokushima honours
Honour	No.	Years
Tokushima Prefectural League 2nd Division	1	2006
Tokushima Prefectural League 1st Division	2	2012, 2015
Shikoku Prefectural Leagues Final Tournament	2	2012, 2015
Tokushima Prefectural Football Championship Emperor's Cup Tokushima Prefectural Qualifiers	10	2016, 2017, 2018, 2019, 2020, 2021, 2022, 2023, 2024, 2025
Shikoku Soccer League	5	2020, 2022, 2023, 2024, 2025
