= Tokyo United FC =

Japanese football club

Tokyo United 東京ユナイテッド
- Full name: Tokyo United Football Club
- Founded: 2015; 11 years ago
- Chairman: Shuji Hitomi
- Manager: Masashi Fukuda
- League: Kantō Soccer League
- 2025: 1st of 10 (Champions)
- Website: https://tokyo-united-fc.jp/
Home colours	Away colours

Tokyo United FC (東京ユナイテッドFC, Tōkyō Yunaiteddo Efushi) is a football (soccer) club based in Bunkyō, which is located in Tokyo in Japan. They play in the Kantō Soccer League, which is part of Japanese Regional Leagues. It is the reserve team of Tokyo Musashino United, who plays at the Japan Football League.

== History ==
In January 2015, Keio University Soccer Team - playing in Tokyo Metropolitan Football League - decided to merge with Tokyo University Association Football Club, the football team of University of Tokyo. The will of this new reality is to reach J. League by 2020.

After getting the club to Division 1 of Kantō Soccer League, the club changed their name to Tokyo United Football Club in 2016. They also featured a female team, Bunkyo LB Ladies.

On 2021, they merged with Tokyo Musashino City to form current Japan Football League club Tokyo Musashino United. The existing Tokyo United team became Musashino's reserve team.

== League record ==
Champions	Runners-up	Third place	Promoted	Relegated

League											Emperor's Cup	Shakaijin Cup
Season	Division	Position	GP	W	D	L	F	A	GD	Pts	Emperor's Cup	Shakaijin Cup
2015	Tokyo Metropolitan Football League (Div. 1)	2nd	14	10	2	2	37	10	27	32		
2016	Kantō Soccer League (Div. 2)	1st	18	11	3	4	36	18	18	36		
2017	Kantō Soccer League (Div. 1)	3rd	18	8	6	4	40	25	15	30		
2018	Kantō Soccer League (Div. 1)	3rd	18	8	6	4	37	26	11	30		
2019	Kantō Soccer League (Div. 1)	2nd	18	12	1	5	32	16	16	37		
2020	Kantō Soccer League (Div. 1)	3rd	9	6	1	2	15	7	8	19		
2021	Kantō Soccer League (Div. 1)	9th	22	7	3	12	21	29	-8	24		
2022	Kantō Soccer League (Div. 1)	2nd	18	11	2	5	35	20	15	35		
2023	Kantō Soccer League (Div. 1)	3rd	18	9	5	4	27	19	8	32		
2024	Kantō Soccer League (Div. 1)	5th	18	7	3	8	24	24	0	24		
2025	Kantō Soccer League (Div. 1)	1st	18	15	1	2	32	13	19	46		

Key

- Pos. = Position in league; GP = Games played; W = Games won; D = Games drawn; L = Games lost; F = Goals scored; A = Goals conceded; GD = Goals difference; Pts = Points gained

== Honours ==
Tokyo United FC honours
Honour	No.	Years
Kantō Soccer League Division 2	1	2016
Kantō Soccer League Division 1	1	2025

== Current squad ==
Updated to 23 August 2023.

Note: Flags indicate national team as defined under FIFA eligibility rules; some limited exceptions apply. Players may hold more than one non-FIFA nationality.

No.	Pos.	Nation	Player
1	GK	JPN	Satoshi Tahara
2	DF	JPN	Yuki Ohata
3	DF	JPN	Koyo Ono
4	MF	JPN	Kodai Yamazaki
5	DF	JPN	Katsuya Kozai
6	MF	JPN	Takumi Kondo
7	MF	JPN	Hayato Shiozawa
8	MF	JPN	Kenta Kurishima
9	MF	JPN	Daisuke Yoneda
10	MF	JPN	Koki Ito
11	FW	JPN	Takehiro Hattori
13	DF	JPN	Tatsuya Mochizuki
14	FW	JPN	Seiya Niizeki
15	DF	JPN	Tatsuya Kamikaseda
16	MF	JPN	Yu Kawarada
17	MF	JPN	Kazuki Takahashi
18	FW	JPN	Ken Mochizuki
19	MF	JPN	Yasutaka Shimizu
20	MF	JPN	Kazushi Takizawa
21	GK	JPN	Masahiro Otaki
22	DF	JPN	Shuya Hashimoto

No.	Pos.	Nation	Player
23	FW	JPN	Hikaru Miyata
24	MF	JPN	Ryu Okamoto
25	DF	JPN	Konosuke Kusazumi
26	MF	JPN	Toranosuke Iida
27	MF	JPN	Shun Sugiyama
28	DF	JPN	Hideaki Arai
29	FW	JPN	Taiga Ogawa
30	MF	JPN	Yuto Murosaki
31	GK	JPN	Seina Ubukata
32	MF	JPN	Koki Arakawa
33	FW	JPN	Takeru Noda
35	MF	JPN	Taiju Segawa
36	MF	JPN	Seiya Tsukagoshi
37	MF	JPN	Kosei Tamagawa
38	DF	JPN	Mizuto Mashimo
39	DF	JPN	Yuji Kawagoe
41	GK	JPN	Meguru Hirata
42	MF	JPN	Tomoya Kobayashi
44	FW	JPN	Riku Sasaki
—	GK	JPN	Taku Kamikawa (on loan from Fukushima United)
