= Veroskronos Tsuno =

Japanese football club

Veroskronos Tsuno ヴェロスクロノス都農
- Full name: Veroskronos Tsuno
- Founded: 2014
- Ground: Fujimi Park Stadium, Tsuno
- Capacity: 3,100
- Chairman: Hiromi Matsuzaki
- Manager: Manato Kotera
- League: Kyushu Soccer League
- 2025: 2nd of 10
- Website: veroskronos.com
Home colours	Away colours

Veroskronos Tsuno (ヴェロスクロノス都農, Verosukuronosu Tsuno) is a Japanese football club based in Tsuno in Miyazaki Prefecture. They play in the Kyushu Soccer League, which is part of Japanese Regional Leagues.

== History ==
In March 2014, the head coach at Hosho Junior & Senior High School – Hiromi Matsuzaki – worked closely with Miyazaki Sangyo-keiei University to give Miyazaki a new team, someone which could try to climb Japanese football's pyramid. At the time, the previous most-known club Estrela Miyazaki had just dissolved and the region needed a new football face to reach the J.League. While Tegevajaro Miyazaki was the team to reach that level for the region, Veroskronos Tsuno has won the Kyushu Soccer League 5 times since its inaugural season promotion from the Miyazaki Regional League in 2014.

J.FC Miyazaki (the "J" stands for "jump" to the J. League) immediately raised their level, conquering a spot in Kyushu Soccer League and qualifying to 2015 Emperor's Cup 1st round, after defeating home-rivals Tegevajaro Miyazaki. Giravanz Kitakyushu defeated J.FC Miyazaki, 2–1, in a tight match.

After winning the 2016 title, the club now hopes to reach professional football as soon as they can.

In 2020, the club was moved from Miyazaki to Tsuno. And their name was changed to Veroskronos Tsuno from 2021 season.

== League and cup record ==
Champions	Runners-up	Third place	Promoted	Relegated

League											Emperor's Cup	Shakaijin Cup
Season	Division	Pos.	P	W (PK)	D	L (PK)	F	A	GD	Pts	Emperor's Cup	Shakaijin Cup
J.FC Miyazaki
2014	Miyazaki Prefectural League	1st	8	8 (0)		0 (0)				24		
2015	Kyushu Soccer League	3rd	18	10 (1)		3 (4)	55	43	12	36	1st Round	1st round
2016	Kyushu Soccer League	1st	9	8 (0)		0 (1)	25	11	14	25	Did not qualify	
2017	Kyushu Soccer League	2nd	20	15 (2)		3 (0)	55	20	35	49	Did not qualify	1st round
2018	Kyushu Soccer League	1st	18	16 (0)		1 (1)	56	15	41	48	Did not qualify	1st round
2019	Kyushu Soccer League	2nd	18	15 (0)		2 (1)	53	20	33	46	Did not qualify	1st round
2020	Kyushu Soccer League	2nd	3	3 (0)		0 (0)	12	2	10	9	Did not qualify	Tournament cancelled
Veroskronos Tsuno
2021	Kyushu Soccer League	2nd	18	16 (1)		1 (0)	76	12	64	50	Did not qualify	Tournament cancelled
2022	Kyushu Soccer League	3rd	20	15	2	3	65	10	55	47	Did not qualify	4th place
2023	Kyushu Soccer League	1st	18	15	2	1	74	6	68	47	Did not qualify	Quarter-finals
2024	Kyushu Soccer League	1st	18	16	1	1	67	8	59	49	Did not qualify	Quarter-finals
2025	Kyushu Soccer League	2nd	18	14	1	3	64	13	51	43	2nd round	Winner
2026	Kyushu Soccer League	TBA	18								TBD	TBD

Key

- Pos. = Position in league; P = Games played; W = Games won; W (PK) = Games won on penalty kicks; D = Games drawn; L = Games lost; L (PK) = Games lost on penalty kicks; F = Goals scored; A = Goals conceded; GD = Goals difference; Pts = Points gained

== Honours ==
Veroskronos Tsuno honours
Honour	No.	Years
Miyazaki Prefectural League	1	2014
Miyazaki Prefectural Soccer Championship Emperor's Cup Miyazaki Prefectural Qualifier	2	2015, 2025
Kyushu Soccer League	3	2016, 2018, 2023, 2024
Shakaijin Cup	1	2025

== Current squad ==
As of 24 July 2025

Note: Flags indicate national team as defined under FIFA eligibility rules; some limited exceptions apply. Players may hold more than one non-FIFA nationality.

No.	Pos.	Nation	Player
1	GK	JPN	Rei Akatsuka
2	DF	JPN	Ryushin Kuno
3	MF	JPN	Kanta Kajiyama
4	DF	JPN	Matsuoka Longing
5	DF	JPN	Keiya Yamabara
6	DF	JPN	Kenta Yanagida
7	MF	JPN	Akira Yamauchi
8	FW	JPN	Yuki Nakayama
9	FW	JPN	Yuta Yamada
10	MF	JPN	Ryo Nakamura
11	FW	JPN	Tomoya Hamada
13	FW	JPN	Shuto Kammera
14	MF	JPN	Goryo Junki
15	MF	JPN	Yahiro Mimoto
16	DF	JPN	Ken Takahashi

No.	Pos.	Nation	Player
17	MF	JPN	Nagayoshi Kodai
18	DF	JPN	Masaya Inoue
19	FW	JPN	Ryuya Suzuki
20	DF	JPN	Hiromichi Fujita
21	GK	JPN	Sho Nakano
22	DF	JPN	Koutarou Takeda
23	MF	JPN	Yudai Nagano
24	DF	JPN	Keishi Fujimoto
25	MF	JPN	Kumashiro Ikkei
26	FW	JPN	Ryosei Tanabe
27	FW	JPN	Kanta Matsumoto
28	DF	JPN	Ryuya Fukushima
29	FW	JPN	Shinma Sakai
30	GK	JPN	Daichi Asai
32	GK	JPN	Nakayama Kaifan

== Historical Badges ==
Club Badges
2014–2020	2021–
