= Kyushu Soccer League =

Kyūshū Soccer League
- Founded: 1973; 53 years ago
- Country: Japan
- Confederation: AFC
- Divisions: 1
- Number of clubs: 10
- Level on pyramid: 5
- Promotion to: Japan Football League
- Relegation to: Prefectural Leagues
- Domestic cup: Emperor's Cup
- Current champions: J-Lease FC (2025)
- Most championships: Kitakyushu FC (8)
- Current: 2026 Japanese Regional Leagues

Kyūshū Soccer League (九州サッカーリーグ, Kyūshū Sakkā Rīgu) is the Japanese fifth tier of league football, which is part of the Japanese Regional Leagues. It covers eight prefectures, which are (Fukuoka, Saga, Nagasaki, Kumamoto, Oita, Miyazaki, Kagoshima and Okinawa).

== 2026 clubs ==
#	Team	Hometown	Notes
1	Brew Saga	Kashima, Saga	
2	Club Atletico Celeste	Nagasaki	Promoted as champions from the Kyushu Prefectural League Finals
3	MHI Nagasaki SC	Nagasaki, Nagasaki	
4	Kawasoe Club	Saga, Saga	
5	KMG Holdings FC	Fukuoka, Fukuoka	
6	Nexus Miyako FC	Miyazaki	Promoted as runners-up from the Kyushu Prefectural League Finals
7	NIFS Kanoya FC	Kanoya, Kagoshima	With the promotion of J-Reese FC, remained in division
8	Nippon Steel & Sumitomo Metal Oita	Ōita, Ōita	
9	Nobeoka Agata	Nobeoka, Miyazaki	
10	Veroskronos Tsuno	Tsuno, Miyazaki	

== Kyūshū Soccer League champions ==
Edition	Year	Winner
1	1973	Mitsubishi Kasei Kurosaki (1)
2	1974	Kagoshima Teachers (1)
3	1975	Nakatsu Club (1)
4	1976	Nakatsu Club (2)
5	1977	Kumamoto Teachers (1)
6	1978	Nakatsu Club (3)
7	1979	Nakatsu Club (4)
8	1980	Nakatsu Club (5)
9	1981	Mitsubishi Kasei Kurosaki (2)
10	1982	Mitsubishi Kasei Kurosaki (3)
11	1983	Mitsubishi Kasei Kurosaki (4)
12	1984	Mitsubishi Kasei Kurosaki (5)
13	1985	Nippon Steel Oita (1)
14	1986	Kagoshima Teachers (2)
15	1987	Mitsubishi Kasei Kurosaki (6)
16	1988	Nippon Steel Oita (2)
17	1989	Mitsubishi Kasei Kurosaki (7)
18	1990	Tobiume Club (1)
19	1991	NTT Kyushu (1)
20	1992	Nippon Steel Yawata (1)
21	1993	Toa Construction FC (1)
22	1994	NTT Kyushu (2)
23	1995	Ōita Trinity (1)
24	1996	NTT Kyushu (3)
25	1997	NTT Kyushu (4)
26	1998	Blaze Kumamoto (2)
27	1999	NTT Kyushu (5)
28	2000	NTT Kumamoto (6)
29	2001	Profesor Miyazaki (1)
30	2002	Kariyushi Okinawa (1)
31	2003	Kariyushi Okinawa (2)
32	2004	Honda Lock SC (1)
33	2005	Roasso Kumamoto (7)
34	2006	V-Varen Nagasaki (1)
35	2007	New Wave Kitakyushu (8)
36	2008	Kariyushi Okinawa (3)
37	2009	Kariyushi Okinawa (4)
38	2010	Hoya Athletico Elan Oita (1)
39	2011	Hoyo AC Elan Oita (2)
40	2012	FC Kagoshima (1)
41	2013	Volca Kagoshima (3)
42	2014	Nippon Steel & Sumitomo Metal Oita (3)
43	2015	Nippon Steel & Sumitomo Metal Oita (4)
44	2016	J.FC Miyazaki (1)
45	2017	Tegevajaro Miyazaki (1)
46	2018	J.FC Miyazaki (2)
47	2019	Okinawa SV (1)
48	2020	On August 11, the Kyushu League was abandoned, Okinawa SV qualified to Regional Promotion Series.
49	2021	Okinawa SV (2)
50	2022	Okinawa SV (3)
51	2023	Veroskronos Tsuno (3)
52	2024	Veroskronos Tsuno (4)
53	2025	J-Lease FC (1)
54	2026	TBD (-)
