= 2023 All Japan Senior Football Championship =

Shakaijin Cup

Tournament details
- Country: Japan
- Dates: 21 October 2023 – 25 October 2023
- Teams: 32

Final positions
- Champions: FC Kariya (1st title)
- Runners-up: Arterivo Wakayama

Tournament statistics
- Matches played: 32
- Goals scored: 98 (3.06 per match)
- Attendance: 4,900 (153 per match)
- Top goal scorer(s): Kai Nomura (FC Tokushima) (5 goals)

The 59th All Japan Senior Football Championship (Japanese: 第59回全国社会人サッカー選手権大会, Hepburn: Dai 59-kai zenkoku shakai hito sakkā senshuken taikai), officially the 2023 All Japan Adults Football Tournament, and most known as the 2023 Shakaijin Cup, was the 59th edition of the annually contested single-elimination tournament (or cup) for the best-ranked amateur clubs in Japan. As it's restricted to non-league clubs (Participating on Regional or Prefectural Leagues; not included in the nationwide league competitions), the defending champions, Briobecca Urayasu, could not defend their title as they are playing the 2023 season in the Japan Football League, Japan's 4th-tier league. All the matches were streamed in the "Shakaijin Cup" channel.

== Venues ==
- Saga City
  - Saga Stadium (SAGAスタジアム)
  - Saga Sunrise Park Ball Game Field A/B (SAGAサンライズパーク_ボールフィールド A/B)
  - Saga Healthy Active Life Promote Center Soccer/Rugby Field (佐賀市健康運動センターサッカー・ラグビー場)
- Tosu City
  - Ekimae Real Estate Stadium (駅前不動産スタジアム)
  - Tosu Stadium Northern Ground A/B (鳥栖スタジアム北部グラウンド A/B)

== Holding method ==
Every match at the tournament was played with 40 minutes per half, instead of the usual 45, with every match being played under 80 minutes of action in total, excluding added time. The match would go directly to a penalty shoot-out, if a winner was not decided after the full-time whistle. Up to five substitutions in three or less substitution breaks (excluding half-time) were allowed at the tournament, as per FIFA recommendation.

The top three teams qualified to play on the 2023 edition of the Japanese Regional Champions League, which serves as Japan Football League's play-off tournament. However, the top three teams do not necessarily mean the semi-finalists. Instead, it refers to the best-ranked teams in the "Shakaijin" among those that have not finished as champions of their respective Regional Leagues.

About individual suspensions, players or officials should be suspended for an upcoming fixture if they: Receive a yellow card in two consecutive matches; receive a red card. Also, accumulated yellow cards would be reset to zero after the quarter-finals.

== Participating teams ==
Regional champions who were at the time already qualified for the Regional Champions League are denoted in bold. Teams from the 6th tier or below can not participate in the Regional Champions League and are denoted in italics.

Region	Slots	Team	Division (tier)
Saga (Host)	1	Brew Kashima	Kyushu Soccer League (5)
Hokkaido	2	Hokkaido Tokachi Sky Earth	Hokkaido Soccer League (5)
Hokkaido	2	**BTOP Hokkaido**	Hokkaido Soccer League (5)
Tohoku	2	FC La Universidad de Sendai (ja)	Tohoku Soccer League D1 (5)
Tohoku	2	Cobaltore Onagawa	Tohoku Soccer League D1 (5)
Kantō	7	Tochigi City	Kantō Soccer League D1 (5)
Kantō	7	Tokyo United	Kantō Soccer League D1 (5)
Kantō	7	Tokyo 23 FC	Kantō Soccer League D1 (5)
Kantō	7	**Vonds Ichihara**	Kantō Soccer League D1 (5)
Kantō	7	Joyful Honda Tsukuba	Kantō Soccer League D1 (5)
Kantō	7	Toho Titanium	Kantō Soccer League D1 (5)
Kantō	7	Atsugi Hayabusa (ja)	Kantō Soccer League D2 (6)
Hokushin'etsu	2	Artista Asama	Hokushin'etsu Football League (5)
Hokushin'etsu	2	NUHW FC (ja)	Niigata Prefectural League D1 (7)
Tōkai	4	**Wyvern FC**	Tōkai Adult Soccer League D1 (5)
Tōkai	4	FC Kariya	Tōkai Adult Soccer League D1 (5)
Tōkai	4	Gakunan F. Mosuperio (ja)	Tōkai Adult Soccer League D2 (6)
Tōkai	4	Toyota SC (ja)	Tōkai Adult Soccer League D2 (6)

Region	Slots	Team	Division (tier)
Kansai	5	**Arterivo Wakayama**	Kansai Soccer League D1 (5)
Kansai	5	Basara Hyogo (ja)	Kansai Soccer League D1 (5)
Kansai	5	Moriyama Samurai 2000 (ja)	Kansai Soccer League D1 (5)
Kansai	5	Asuka FC (ja)	Kansai Soccer League D1 (5)
Kansai	5	Hannan University Club (ja)	Kansai Soccer League D2 (6)
Chugoku	3	Belugarosso Iwami	Chugoku Soccer League (5)
Chugoku	3	**Fukuyama City**	Chugoku Soccer League (5)
Chugoku	3	Baleine Shimonoseki	Chugoku Soccer League (5)
Shikoku	2	**FC Tokushima**	Shikoku Soccer League (5)
Shikoku	2	KUFC Nankoku (ja)	Shikoku Soccer League (5)
Kyushu	4	J-Lease FC	Kyushu Soccer League (5)
Kyushu	4	**Veroskronos Tsuno**	Kyushu Soccer League (5)
Kyushu	4	Nobeoka Agata	Kyushu Soccer League (5)
Kyushu	4	KMG Holdings FC (ja)	Kyushu Soccer League (5)

== Schedule ==
All times on UTC+09:00, according to Japan Standard Time (JST).

=== Round of 32 ===
21 October 2023 Match 1	BTOP Hokkaido	2–3	Basara Hyogo	Saga
11:00	Shoto Unno 20'; Own goal 48' (o.g.)	Report	Hayato Tsukiyama 36'; Taisuke Akiyoshi 43'; Own goal 67' (o.g.)	Stadium: Saga Stadium; Attendance: 250

21 October 2023 Match 2	J-Lease FC	1–0	Tochigi City	Saga
11:00	Takuma Sonoda 7'	Report		Stadium: Saga Sunrise Park Secasta; Attendance: 200

21 October 2023 Match 3	Joyful Honda Tsukuba	5–0	Toyota SC	Saga
11:00	Tatsunosuke Onzuka 6'; Mizaki Kawashima 11'; Shuta Kotaka 56', 63'; Seiya Kumagai 79'	Report		Stadium: Saga Sunrise Park Ball Field A Attendance: 100

21 October 2023 Match 4	KUFC Nankoku	0–1	Cobaltore Onagawa	Saga
11:00		Report	Ryuya Sakai 80+3'	Stadium: Saga Sunrise Park Ball Field B Attendance: 100

21 October 2023 Match 5	Belugarosso Iwami	0–3	FC Kariya	Saga
11:00		Report	Masayuki Saito 11', 23'; Ryo Ozaki 56'	Stadium: Saga Healthy Active Life Promote Center Soccer/Rugby Field; Attendance: 120

21 October 2023 Match 6	Tokyo 23 FC	2–2 (3–1 p)	Hannan University Club	Tosu
11:00	Hikaru Shimizu 40+3'; Hayate Kobayashi 64'	Report	Yuei Iwasaki 9'; Zen Goto 80+5'	Stadium: Ekimae Real Estate Stadium; Attendance: 150
	Penalties
	Yui Shikida (penalty scored); Sotaro Murakami (penalty scored); Hayate Kobayashi (penalty scored)		Naoya Namba (penalty scored); Yuki Morita (penalty missed); Yuei Iwasaki (penalty missed); Junnosuke Shinoda (penalty missed)

21 October 2023 Match 7	Fukuyama City	0–1	Toho Titanium	Tosu
11:00		Report	Ren Yoshida 63'	Stadium: Tosu Stadium Northern Ground A Attendance: 150

21 October 2023 Match 8	KMG Holdings	4–3	NUHW FC	Tosu
11:00	Ryuto Maruyama 7'; Kazushi Fukuda 10'; Koki Tsukiji 40'; Own goal 79' (o.g.)	Report	Takeru Sato 20', 31'; Daichi Tomita 61'	Stadium: Tosu Stadium Northern Ground B Attendance: 150

21 October 2023 Match 9	Veroskronos Tsuno	3–2	Atsugi Hayabusa	Saga
13:30	Ryo Nakamura 20'; Takara Masutani 39'; Kenzo Taniguchi 78'	Report	Kanta Shigematsu 34'; Mizuki Miyagawa 55'	Stadium: Saga Stadium; Attendance: 250

21 October 2023 Match 10	Moriyama Samurai 2000	2–2 (3–5 p)	Wyvern FC	Saga
13:30	Koyo Fujita 2'; Tomoya Uratani 63'	Report	Yusuke Taniguchi 28'; Itsuki Nishihara 80+6'	Stadium: Saga Sunrise Park Secasta; Attendance: 50
	Penalties
	Tomoki Mitajiri (penalty scored); Eiji Umemura (penalty scored); Kei Okada (penalty scored); Hodaka Taniguchi (penalty missed)		Hiroki Sekido (penalty scored); Shoma Tanaka (penalty scored); Hiroto Matsubara (penalty scored); Daiki Yamamoto (penalty scored); Tomohiro Tsuda (penalty scored)

21 October 2023 Match 11	Arterivo Wakayama	1–0	Tokyo United	Saga
13:30	Sho Horino 49'	Report		Stadium: Saga Sunrise Park Ball Field A Attendance: 50

21 October 2023 Match 12	Gakunan F. Mosuperio	2–3	Artista Asama	Saga
13:30	Ryo Asahina 40+1'; Kosuke Goto 42'	Report	Itsuki Takagai 14', 71', 73'	Stadium: Saga Sunrise Park Ball Field B Attendance: 100

21 October 2023 Match 13	Hokkaido Tokachi Sky Earth	4–0	Brew Kashima	Saga
13:30	Yuta Kawamoto 10'; Own goal 12' (o.g.); Junya Goto 54'; Junki Yokono 70'	Report		Stadium: Saga Healthy Active Life Promote Center Soccer/Rugby Field; Attendance: 130

21 October 2023 Match 14	FC Tokushima	5–1	FC La Universidad de Sendai	Tosu
13:30	Kai Nomura 13'; Daiki Deoka 40'; Kodai Himeda 61'; Keisuke Sasaki 74', 80+2'	Report	Mao Hatamura 70'	Stadium: Ekimae Real Estate Stadium; Attendance: 100

21 October 2023 Match 15	Baleine Shimonoseki	1–1 (4–2 p)	Asuka FC	Tosu
13:30	Shiori Nakai 51'	Report	Sasuga Kiyokawa 25'	Stadium: Tosu Stadium Northern Ground A Attendance: 150
	Penalties
	Hiroki Sasaki (penalty scored); Yuto Kawai (penalty scored); Shiori Nakai (penalty scored); Kota Yonezawa (penalty scored)		Ryosuke Iguchi (penalty scored); Pek Myong-chol (penalty missed); Koki Okura (penalty scored); Sasuga Kiyokawa (penalty missed)

21 October 2023 Match 16	Vonds Ichihara	0–2	Nobeoka Agata	Tosu
13:30		Report	Kaoru Ikemoto 80+2'; Masaki Sakai 80+7'	Stadium: Tosu Stadium Northern Ground B Attendance: 150

=== Round of 16 ===
22 October 2023 Match 17	Basara Hyogo	1–2	J-Lease FC	Saga
11:00	Aruma Nonaka 20'	Report	Junki Endo 21'; Takuma Sonoda 46'	Stadium: Saga Stadium; Attendance: 300

22 October 2023 Match 18	Joyful Honda Tsukuba	1–0	Cobaltore Onagawa	Saga
11:00	Shun Aoki 5'	Report		Stadium: Saga Sunrise Park Secasta; Attendance: 150

22 October 2023 Match 19	FC Kariya	2–1	Tokyo 23 FC	Tosu
11:00	Tatsuki Onuma 80+1'; Ryosuke Oshima 80+3'	Report	Yuga Harashina 73'	Stadium: Tosu Stadium Northern Ground A Attendance: 150

22 October 2023 Match 20	Toho Titanium	0–0 (3–5 p)	KMG Holdings	Tosu
11:00		Report		Stadium: Tosu Stadium Northern Ground B Attendance: 200
	Penalties
	Yuta Komatsuzaki (penalty missed); Kodai Enomoto (penalty scored); Ren Yoshida (penalty scored); Hiroki Tanaka (penalty scored)		Ryuto Maruyama (penalty scored); Yuta Hashimoto (penalty scored); Kyotaro Iwai (penalty scored); Takahiro Goto (penalty scored); Seiya Otaka (penalty scored)

22 October 2023 Match 21	Veroskronos Tsuno	2–0	Wyvern FC	Saga
13:30	Shoma Suzuki 15'; Kazuki Sato 71'	Report		Stadium: Saga Stadium; Attendance: 250

22 October 2023 Match 22	Arterivo Wakayama	2–1	Artista Asama	Saga
13:30	Junya Kitano 19'; Masafumi Kiyomoto 80+4'	Report	Kazuki Kobayashi 73'	Stadium: Saga Sunrise Park Secasta; Attendance: 100

22 October 2023 Match 23	Hokkaido Tokachi Sky Earth	0–1	FC Tokushima	Tosu
13:30		Report	Kai Nomura 24'	Stadium: Tosu Stadium Northern Ground A Attendance: 150

22 October 2023 Match 24	Baleine Shimonoseki	0–3	Nobeoka Agata	Tosu
13:30		Report	Masaya Inoue 50'; Own goal 61'; Minato Kamei 73'	Stadium: Tosu Stadium Northern Ground B Attendance: 200

=== Quarter-finals ===
23 October 2023 Match 25	J-Lease FC	1–3	Joyful Honda Tsukuba	Saga
11:00	Kazuki Ganaha 59'	Report	Shun Aoki 32', 38'; Kazuma Kuwata 78'	Stadium: Saga Stadium; Attendance: 250

23 October 2023 Match 26	FC Kariya	5–0	KMG Holdings	Tosu
11:00	Masayuki Saito 9'; Tatsuki Onuma 62'; Ryosuke Oshima 64'; Ryo Ozaki 73'; Ryoto Kamiya 80+2'	Report		Stadium: Ekimae Real Estate Stadium; Attendance: 150

23 October 2023 Match 27	Veroskronos Tsuno	0–1	Arterivo Wakayama	Saga
13:30		Report	Tomoya Seki 47'	Stadium: Saga Stadium; Attendance: 150

23 October 2023 Match 28	FC Tokushima	2–1	Nobeoka Agata	Tosu
13:30	Daiki Deoka 25'; Kai Nomura 34'	Report	Masaya Inoue 45'	Stadium: Ekimae Real Estate Stadium; Attendance: 200

Joyful Honda Tsukuba and FC Kariya qualified to the Regional Champions League.

=== Semi-finals ===
24 October 2023 Match 29	Joyful Honda Tsukuba	2–2 (4–5 p)	FC Kariya	Tosu
11:00	Yuya Gunji 2'; Hideaki Miyamoto 35'	Report	Own goal 21' (o.g.); Shinichiro Sonoda 37'	Stadium: Tosu Stadium Northern Ground A Attendance: 100
	Penalties
	Shunsuke Yamazaki (penalty scored); Ryunosuke Suzuki (penalty scored); Keisuke Komuro (penalty scored); Tatsunosuke Onzuka (penalty missed); Kazuma Kuwata (penalty scored)		Ryo Ozaki (penalty scored); Tatsuki Onuma (penalty scored); Ren Iijima (penalty scored); Shuto Izuka (penalty scored); Masayuki Saito (penalty scored)

24 October 2023 Match 30	Arterivo Wakayama	3–1	FC Tokushima	Tosu
11:00	Masafumi Kiyomoto 22'; Koshiro Onda 70'; Shuto Tatsuta 80+1'	Report	Kokoro Minamino 19'	Stadium: Tosu Stadium Northern Ground B Attendance: 50

=== 3rd-place match ===
25 October 2023 Match 31	Joyful Honda Tsukuba	1–2	FC Tokushima	Tosu
10:00	Kazuma Kuwata 45'	Report	Kai Nomura 67', 80+2'	Stadium: Ekimae Real Estate Stadium; Attendance: 50; Referee: Takamasa Funahashi

=== Final ===
25 October 2023
12:30
Match 32

FC Kariya	1–1	Arterivo Wakayama
Naoto Suzuki 74'	Report	Tomoya Seki 62'
Penalties
Ryo Ozaki (penalty scored); Tatsuki Onuma (penalty scored); Ren Iijima (penalty scored); Shuto Izuka (penalty scored)	4–2	Tatsuro Yamauchi (penalty missed); Tomoya Seki (penalty scored); Yusei Ohashi (penalty scored); Koshiro Onda (penalty missed)

Ekimae Real Estate Stadium, Tosu
Attendance: 100
Referee: Yuki Tanabe

GK	21	(Japan) Takuya Kojima
DF	2	(Japan) Ryosuke Oshima
DF	5	(Japan) Shuto Izuka
DF	6	(Japan) Kazunari Ishida	(yellow card) 80+1'
DF	28	(Japan) Ren Iijima
MF	8	(Japan) Masayuki Saito
MF	10	(Japan) Ryo Ozaki (c)
MF	23	(Japan) Shinichiro Sonoda	(substituted off) 56'
MF	26	(Japan) Kaito Kinoshita	(substituted off) 64'
FW	9	(Japan) Naoto Suzuki
FW	20	(Japan) Yutaka Ito	(substituted off) 79'
Substitutes:
GK	16	(Japan) Yusei Narita
DF	3	(Japan) Teruyuki Moniwa
DF	13	(Japan) Aoi Chishima
DF	25	(Japan) Kimiaki Nishikawa
MF	7	(Japan) Tatsuki Onuma	(substituted on) 64'
FW	29	(Japan) Chihiro Otomo	(substituted on) 56'
FW	30	(Japan) Ryoto Kamiya	(substituted on) 79'
Manager:
(Japan) Koji Kadota

GK	31	(Japan) Kenta Isobe
DF	3	(Japan) Yusei Ohashi
DF	4	(Japan) Daichi Yamada (c)
DF	5	(Japan) Yuki Futatsugi
MF	6	(Japan) Yuto Shibata	(substituted off) 40'
MF	14	(Japan) Masafumi Kiyomoto
MF	18	(Japan) Shuto Tatsuta	(substituted off) 58'
MF	22	(Japan) Tessei Kinoshita	(substituted off) 40'
MF	24	(Japan) Koshiro Onda
FW	11	(Japan) Junya Kitano	(substituted off) 78'
FW	15	(Japan) Haruki Shinjo	(substituted off) 29'
Substitutes:
GK	1	(Japan) Hironobu Yoshizaki
DF	13	(Japan) Yuji Yoshitani	(substituted on) 40'
MF	7	(Japan) Sho Horino	(substituted on) 58'
MF	10	(Japan) Ryo Taguchi
MF	17	(Japan) Tomoya Seki	(substituted on) 40'
MF	20	(Japan) Toki Yamase	(substituted on) 29'
FW	9	(Japan) Tatsuro Yamauchi	(substituted on) 78'
Manager:
(Japan) Eishi Kaizu

Assistant referees:
Kazuki Nakamura
Hiro Yamaguchi
Fourth official:
Yoshiki Hirose

Match rules

- 80 minutes.
- Penalty shoot-out if scores still level.
- Seven named substitutes.
- Maximum of five substitutions.

== Top scorers ==
Rank	Player	Club	Goals
1	(Japan) Kai Nomura	FC Tokushima	5
2	(Japan) Shun Aoki	Joyful Honda Tsukuba	3
2	(Japan) Masayuki Saito	FC Kariya	3
2	(Japan) Itsuki Takagai	Artista Asama	3
5	(Japan) Daiki Deoka	FC Tokushima	2
5	(Japan) Masaya Inoue	Nobeoka Agata	2
5	(Japan) Masafumi Kiyomoto	Arterivo Wakayama	2
5	(Japan) Shuta Kotaka	Joyful Honda Tsukuba	2
5	(Japan) Kazuma Kuwata	Joyful Honda Tsukuba	2
5	(Japan) Tatsuki Onuma	FC Kariya	2
5	(Japan) Ryosuke Oshima	FC Kariya	2
5	(Japan) Ryo Ozaki	FC Kariya	2
5	(Japan) Keisuke Sasaki	La Universidad de Sendai	2
5	(Japan) Takeru Sato	NUHW FC	2
5	(Japan) Tomoya Seki	Arterivo Wakayama	2
5	(Japan) Takuma Sonoda	J-Lease FC	2

== See also ==
- 2023 J1 League
- 2023 J2 League
- 2023 J3 League
- 2023 Japanese Regional Leagues
- 2023 Emperor's Cup
- 2023 J.League Cup
