= 2023 Japanese Regional Football Champions League =

Japanese amateur leagues football season

2023 Japanese Regional Champions League
Tournament details
- Country: Japan
- Dates: 10–26 November 2023
- Teams: 12

Final positions
- Champions: Tochigi City FC (1st title)
- Runners-up: Vonds Ichihara

Tournament statistics
- Matches played: 24
- Goals scored: 64 (2.67 per match)
- Attendance: 9,411 (392 per match)
- Top goal scorer(s): Ryunosuke Suzuki; Paulo Junichi Tanaka (4 goals)
- All statistics correct as of 26 November 2023.

The 2023 Japanese Regional Football Champions League (全国地域サッカーチャンピオンズリーグ2023) is the 47th edition of the referred annually contested cup for the best-placed teams of each of their respective Regional Leagues, and of the 2023 Shakaijin Cup. Promoted to the JFL, the club couldn't defend their title. Briobecca Urayasu are the title holders, as they won the championship at the final round. Currently playing in the Japan Football League, they are unable to defend their title.

== Format ==
Twelve teams will participate in the transitional tournament for regional league teams who want to join the JFL. Nine qualifies as champions of their respective Regional Leagues on 2023. The other three spots are by default allocated to the best three Shakaijin Cup teams out of its semi-finalists that were not yet qualified to the Champions League via the Regional Leagues (being placed below the champions of their league).

In case the slots can't be filled, in a situation where more than one semi-finalist has already qualified to the Champions League as regional champions, the empty slot(s) is rewarded to the J.League 100 Year Plan club status holders that finished the season as a Regional League runner-up. If more than one "status holders" finishes the season as the 2nd-placed team in their respective Regional Leagues, an annually-rotated order of priority will be taken into consideration. This year, the order is: Tohoku, Shikoku and Kanto. Tohoku and Shikoku's runners-up Cobaltore Onagawa and Lvnirosso NC are not "status holders". The slot was then assigned to Kanto's runners-up Tochigi City FC, the only status holder out of the three.

Only teams that want to join the JFL can be promoted. If a team with no intention to join the JFL ends up winning the final round, the promotion spot will be allocated to the runner-up. If the runner-up also have no intention to be promoted, a spot will be allocated to the third-placed team. If they also refuse, the bottom-placed team will be promoted instead. In all mentioned scenarios, the bottom-placed team of the 2023 Japan Football League will not be relegated, and no play-off will be held. If both Regional Champions League winner and runner-up aims to be promoted, the winner will be automatically promoted, whereas the runner-up will hold a play-off match with JFL's bottom-placed team.

Depending on the clubs that ended up as the top three teams in the Shakaijin Cup, a specific rank that would take the J.League 100 Year Plan club status clubs and its performances in the 2023 Regional Leagues into account would be applied to determine the final teams on this competition.

== Participating teams ==
Locations of clubs participating in the 2023 National Regional Football Champions League

Returning teams from the previous season were noted in bold. Teams relegated from the previous JFL season were noted in italics.

Region	Slots	Team	Rank
Hokkaido	1	**BTOP Hokkaido**	1st (League)
Tohoku	1	Blancdieu Hirosaki FC	1st (League)
Kantō	3	Vonds Ichihara; Tsukuba FC; **Tochigi City FC**	1st (League); Semi-finalist (Cup); Selected team (100 Year Plan)
Hokushin'etsu	1	Fukui United FC	1st (League)
Tōkai	2	Wyvern FC; **FC Kariya**	1st (League); Finalist (Cup)
Kansai	1	**Arterivo Wakayama**	1st (League)
Chugoku	1	**Fukuyama City FC**	1st (League)
Shikoku	1	**FC Tokushima**	1st (League)
Kyushu	1	**Veroskronos Tsuno**	1st (League)

== Venue ==
First round

Group	Venue	Location	Image
A	Hinata Miyazaki Prefectural; Comprehensive Sports Park	Miyazaki, Miyazaki	
B	Miyagi Co-op Megumino Soccer Field	Rifu, Miyagi	
C	Heiwado HATO Stadium	Hikone, Shiga	

Final round

Venue	Location	Image
Tochigi Green Stadium	Utsunomiya, Tochigi	

== First round ==
Each group had its matches played in a round-robin format. Each team played three matches in just three days, from 11 to 13 November, with one being played at each day. The draw was held on 28 October, and it was streamed live by Kansai Soccer League's official YouTube channel.

=== Group A ===
Pos	Team	Pld	W	D	L	GF	GA	GD	Pts	Qualification
1	Tochigi City	3	3	0	0	8	2	+6	9	Advance to the final round
2	Vonds Ichihara	3	2	0	1	3	1	+2	6	Advance to the final round
3	FC Tokushima	3	1	0	2	3	7	−4	3	
4	Veroskronos Tsuno	3	0	0	3	2	6	−4	0	

Updated to match(es) played on 12 November 2023. Source: JFA

10 November	Veroskronos Tsuno	0–1	Vonds Ichihara	Miyazaki
10:45		Report	Yuji Kato 90+2'	Stadium: Hinata Miyazaki Prefectural Comprehensive Sports Park; Attendance: 341; Referee: Ryo Munakata

10 November	Tochigi City	4–1	FC Tokushima	Miyazaki
13:30	Paulo Junichi Tanaka 67'; Own goal 71' (o.g.); Masahide Hiraoka 78'; Keisuke Ito 90+3'	Report	Keigo Maeno 21'	Stadium: Hinata Miyazaki Prefectural Comprehensive Sports Park; Attendance: 198; Referee: Takeshi Tsukahara

11 November	Veroskronos Tsuno	1–3	Tochigi City	Miyazaki
10:45	Shoma Suzuki 22'	Report	Akira Toshima 38'; Shuto Masuda 60'; Paulo Junichi Tanaka 88'	Stadium: Hinata Miyazaki Prefectural Comprehensive Sports Park; Attendance: 384; Referee: Shohei Ofuji

11 November	Vonds Ichihara	2–0	FC Tokushima	Miyazaki
13:30	Kento Kawada 31'; Kodai Watanabe 54'	Report		Stadium: Hinata Miyazaki Prefectural Comprehensive Sports Park; Attendance: 143; Referee: Ryo Munakata

12 November	Veroskronos Tsuno	1–2	FC Tokushima	Miyazaki
10:45	Reo Ino 55'	Report	Shunsaku Akizuki 74'; Yuta Motoyama 82'	Stadium: Hinata Miyazaki Prefectural Comprehensive Sports Park; Attendance: 272; Referee: Takeshi Tsukahara

12 November	Vonds Ichihara	0–1	Tochigi City	Miyazaki
13:30		Report	Paulo Junichi Tanaka 90+1'	Stadium: Hinata Miyazaki Prefectural Comprehensive Sports Park; Attendance: 100; Referee: Shohei Ofuji

=== Group B ===
Pos	Team	Pld	W	D	L	GF	GA	GD	Pts	Qualification
1	Fukuyama City	3	2	1	0	9	5	+4	7	Advance to the final round
2	Wyvern FC	3	2	0	1	4	5	−1	6	
3	Blancdieu Hirosaki	3	0	2	1	3	4	−1	2	
4	FC Kariya	3	0	1	2	4	6	−2	1	

Updated to match(es) played on 12 November 2023. Source: JFA

10 November	FC Kariya	2–2	Blancdieu Hirosaki	Rifu
10:45	Masato Nomura 49'; Shuto Izuka 90+4'	Report	Teruyuki Takagi 13', 43'	Stadium: Miyagi Co-op Megumino Soccer Field; Attendance: 165; Referee: Yoshihito Hori

10 November	Fukuyama City	5–2	Wyvern FC	Rifu
13:30	Kei Takahashi 31'; Kengo Takata 36'; Shuri Arita 45'; Sota Hamaguchi 55'; Shun Taguchi 74'	Report	Itsuki Nishihara 14'; Tomohiro Tsuda 87'	Stadium: Miyagi Co-op Megumino Soccer Field; Attendance: 102; Referee: Yuki Nishida

11 November	FC Kariya	2–3	Fukuyama City	Rifu
10:45	Naoto Suzuki 54'; Chihiro Otomo 64'	Report	Shuri Arita 6'; Kei Takahashi 61'; Kumpei Kakuta 80'	Stadium: Miyagi Co-op Megumino Soccer Field; Attendance: 185; Referee: Yoshihito Hori

11 November	Blancdieu Hirosaki	0–1	Wyvern FC	Rifu
13:30		Report	Yusuke Taniguchi 59'	Stadium: Miyagi Co-op Megumino Soccer Field; Attendance: 244; Referee: Kakuro Hori

12 November	FC Kariya	0–1	Wyvern FC	Rifu
10:45		Report	Daiki Yamamoto 12'	Stadium: Miyagi Co-op Megumino Soccer Field; Attendance: 150; Referee: Kakuro Hori

12 November	Blancdieu Hirosaki	1–1	Fukuyama City	Rifu
13:30	Kota Itabashi 86'	Report	Daichi Soga 51'	Stadium: Miyagi Co-op Megumino Soccer Field; Attendance: 190; Referee: Yuki Nishida

=== Group C ===
Pos	Team	Pld	W	D	L	GF	GA	GD	Pts	Qualification
1	Joyful Honda Tsukuba	3	1	2	0	4	3	+1	5	Advance to the final round
2	Fukui United	3	1	2	0	3	2	+1	5	
3	BTOP Hokkaido	3	1	0	2	7	6	+1	3	
4	Arterivo Wakayama	3	0	2	1	1	4	−3	2	

Updated to match(es) played on 12 November 2023. Source: JFA

10 November	Arterivo Wakayama	0–0	Fukui United	Hikone
10:45		Report		Stadium: Heiwado HATO Stadium; Attendance: 274; Referee: Masakazu Kato

10 November	Joyful Honda Tsukuba	3–2	BTOP Hokkaido	Hikone
13:30	Shun Aoki 11'; Ryunosuke Suzuki 35'; Tatsunosuke Onzuka 90+3'	Report	Toshiya Motozuka 67'; Ryoka Abe 86'	Stadium: Heiwado HATO Stadium; Attendance: 148; Referee: Yu Tezuka

11 November	Arterivo Wakayama	0–0	Joyful Honda Tsukuba	Hikone
10:45		Report		Stadium: Heiwado HATO Stadium; Attendance: 471; Referee: Yasuhiro Udagawa

11 November	Fukui United	2–1	BTOP Hokkaido	Hikone
13:30	Mahiro Ano 49'; Kohei Kitagawa 71'	Report	Mun Hyong-jong 89'	Stadium: Heiwado HATO Stadium; Attendance: 625; Referee: Yu Tezuka

12 November	Arterivo Wakayama	1–4	BTOP Hokkaido	Hikone
10:45	Tatsuro Yamauchi 47'	Report	Toyoki Yoshiyuki 6'; Ryoka Abe 57'; Musashi Fujiyoshi 81'; Kota Sawada 90+5'	Stadium: Heiwado HATO Stadium; Attendance: 350; Referee: Yasuhiro Udagawa

12 November	Fukui United	1–1	Joyful Honda Tsukuba	Hikone
13:30	Tsugutoshi Oishi 90+1'	Report	Ryunosuke Suzuki 32'	Stadium: Heiwado HATO Stadium; Attendance: 415; Referee: Masakazu Kato

== Ranking of second-placed teams ==
The three winners of each group of the first round will qualify for the final round, alongside the best-placed team among the runners-up of each group.

Pos	Team	Pld	W	D	L	GF	GA	GD	Pts	Qualification
1	Vonds Ichihara	3	2	0	1	3	1	+2	6	Qualification for the final round
2	Wyvern FC	3	2	0	1	4	5	−1	6	
3	Fukui United	3	1	2	0	3	2	+1	5	

Updated to match(es) played on 12 November 2023. Source: JFA

== Final round ==
The group had its matches played in a round-robin format, held in a five-days span, from 22 to 26 November.

Pos	Team	Pld	W	D	L	GF	GA	GD	Pts	Promotion
1	Tochigi City (P)	3	2	0	1	6	2	+4	6	Promoted to the JFL
2	Vonds Ichihara (Q)	3	2	0	1	3	1	+2	6	Qualification for JFL promotion/relegation play-off
3	Joyful Honda Tsukuba	3	1	0	2	2	5	−3	3	
4	Fukuyama City	3	1	0	2	2	5	−3	3	

Updated to match(es) played on 22 November 2023. Source: JFA
(P) Promoted; (Q) Qualified for the phase indicated

22 November	Vonds Ichihara	1–0	Joyful Honda Tsukuba	Utsunomiya
10:45	Yuji Kato 72'	Match Report		Stadium: Tochigi Green Stadium; Attendance: 384; Referee: Yuki Tanabe

22 November	Tochigi City	1–2	Fukuyama City	Utsunomiya
13:30	Masahide Hiraoka 85'	Report	Sota Hamaguchi 27'; Kengo Takata 63'	Stadium: Tochigi Green Stadium; Attendance: 567; Referee: Masaki Adachi

24 November	Vonds Ichihara	0–1	Tochigi City	Utsunomiya
10:45		Report	Paulo Junichi Tanaka 82'	Stadium: Tochigi Green Stadium; Attendance: 691; Referee: Kenya Ohara

24 November	Joyful Honda Tsukuba	2–0	Fukuyama City	Utsunomiya
13:30		Report	Ryunosuke Suzuki 35', 72'	Stadium: Tochigi Green Stadium; Attendance: 416; Referee: Daichi Shiino

26 November	Vonds Ichihara	2–0	Fukuyama City	Utsunomiya
10:45	Koya Tanio 87'; Shohei Kiyohara 90+3'	Report		Stadium: Tochigi Green Stadium; Attendance: 923; Referee: Yoshihito Hori

26 November	Joyful Honda Tsukuba	0–4	Tochigi City	Utsunomiya
13:30		Report	Genta Omotehara 18', 55'; Yuki Yamamura 46', 90+1'	Stadium: Tochigi Green Stadium; Attendance: 1,673; Referee: Takamasa Funahashi

== JFL/Regional Leagues promotion/relegation playoff ==
The play-offs (Japanese: 2023年度JFL·地域入れ替え戦) took place on 3 December 2023.

3 December 2023
13:00

Okinawa SV (2023 JFL 15th)	2–1 (a.e.t.)	Vonds Ichihara (2023 JRFCL runners-up)
Anzai 70'; Ijuin 105'	Report	Tosa 78'

Tapic Kenso Hiyagon Stadium, Okinawa, Okinawa
Attendance: 685
Referee: Toshihiro Nakai

Okinawa SV stayed in the JFL; Vonds Ichihara stayed in the Kantō Soccer League Division 1.

== Top scorers ==
Rank	Player	Club	Goals
1	(Japan) Ryunosuke Suzuki	Joyful Honda Tsukuba	4
1	(Japan) Paulo Junichi Tanaka	Tochigi City	4
3	(Japan) Ryoka Abe	BTOP Hokkaido	2
3	(Japan) Shuri Arita	Fukuyama City	2
3	(Japan) Sota Hamaguchi	Fukuyama City	2
3	(Japan) Masahide Hiraoka	Tochigi City	2
3	(Japan) Yuji Kato	Vonds Ichihara	2
3	(Japan) Genta Omotehara	Tochigi City	2
3	(Japan) Teruyuki Takagi	Blancdieu Hirosaki	2
3	(Japan) Kei Takahashi	Fukuyama City	2
3	(Japan) Kengo Takata	Fukuyama City	2
3	(Japan) Yuki Yamamura	Tochigi City	2
