= Paulo Junichi Tanaka =

Japanese footballer (born 1993)

Paulo Junichi Tanaka 田中 パウロ 淳一
Personal information
- Full name: Paulo Junichi Tanaka
- Date of birth: 23 October 1993 (age 33)
- Place of birth: Takasago, Hyōgo, Japan
- Height: 1.69 m (5 ft 6 1/2 in)
- Position: Midfielder

Team information
- Current team: Tochigi City FC
- Number: 77

Youth career
- Yoneda SSS
- Hyogo FC
- –2008: Zarpa FC
- 2009–2011: Osaka Toin High School

Senior career*
| Years | Team | Apps | (Gls) |
| 2012–2013 | Kawasaki Frontale | 3 | (0) |
| 2014–2015 | Zweigen Kanazawa | 49 | (2) |
| 2016–2018 | FC Gifu | 88 | (13) |
| 2019–2020 | Renofa Yamaguchi | 67 | (6) |
| 2021–2022 | Matsumoto Yamaga | 31 | (3) |
| 2023– | Tochigi City FC | 107 | (28) |
- * Club domestic league appearances and goals as of 16 August 2026

Paulo Junichi Tanaka (田中 パウロ 淳一, Tanaka Pauro Junichi; born October 23, 1993) is a Japanese football player who play as a midfielder and currently play for J2 League club, Tochigi City FC.

== Career ==
Paulo Junichi Tanaka began his youth career with Osaka Toin High School in 2009, and left in 2011 when he graduated.

On 18 November 2011, Paulo Junichi Tanaka began his professional career with Kawasaki Frontale from 2012. He left the club in 2013.

On 14 January 2014, Tanaka signed to J3 League's new member club, Zweigen Kanazawa. He participated in 24 games, mainly as a substitute and contributed to the team's victory in J3 and promotion to the J2 League. He left the club in 2015 after two years at Kanazawa.

On 22 December 2015, Tanaka announce official transfer to J2 club, FC Gifu from 2016. He left the club in 2018 after three years.

On 23 December 2018, Tanaka officially joined to fellow J2 club, Renofa Yamaguchi for the upcoming 2019 season. He left the club in 2013 after two years at Yamaguchi.

On 23 December 2020, Tanaka officially transfer to fellow J2 club, Matsumoto Yamaga for the upcoming 2021 season. On 24 November 2022, he left after two years as his contract expired.

On 3 February 2023, Tanaka announce official transfer to Kantō Soccer League club, Tochigi City FC ahead of 2023 season. On 26 November 2023, Tanaka brought his club promotion to JFL from 2024 after defeat Joyful Honda Tsukuba 4–0 in final matchweek of JRCL in 2023 and Champions. On 17 November 2024, Tanaka brought his club Champions of JFL and promotion to J3 League for the first time in their history from 2025 after defeat Atletico Suzuka 6-0 in matchweek 29 of Japan Football League, returning to third tier after 11 years absence.

== Personal life ==
Tanaka Paulo Junichi was born in Takasago, Hyogo. His mother is Filipino from Cotabato, while father is Japanese from Hyogo Prefecture. He is active in YouTube and TikTok.

== Career statistics ==
As of match played 15 February 2025.

Appearances and goals by club, season and competition
| Club | Season | League | | | Emperor's Cup | | J.League Cup | | Total | |
| Club | Season | Division | Apps | Goals | Apps | Goals | Apps | Goals | Apps | Goals |
|---|---|---|---|---|---|---|---|---|---|---|
| Kawasaki Frontale | 2012 | J.League Div 1 | 3 | 0 | 0 | 0 | 0 | 0 | 3 | 0 |
| Kawasaki Frontale | 2013 | J.League Div 1 | 0 | 0 | – | | 0 | 0 | 0 | 0 |
| Zweigen Kanazawa | 2014 | J3 League | 24 | 2 | 2 | 0 | – | | 26 | 2 |
| Zweigen Kanazawa | 2015 | J2 League | 25 | 0 | 2 | 1 | – | | 27 | 1 |
| FC Gifu | 2016 | J2 League | 20 | 0 | 1 | 0 | – | | 21 | 0 |
| FC Gifu | 2017 | J2 League | 36 | 5 | 0 | 0 | – | | 36 | 5 |
| FC Gifu | 2018 | J2 League | 32 | 8 | 0 | 0 | – | | 32 | 8 |
| Renofa Yamaguchi | 2019 | J2 League | 36 | 6 | 2 | 0 | – | | 38 | 6 |
| Renofa Yamaguchi | 2020 | J2 League | 31 | 1 | 0 | 0 | – | | 31 | 1 |
| Matsumoto Yamaga | 2021 | J2 League | 23 | 0 | 2 | 0 | – | | 25 | 0 |
| Matsumoto Yamaga | 2022 | J3 League | 8 | 3 | 2 | 3 | – | | 10 | 6 |
| Tochigi City FC | 2023 | Kantō Soccer League Div. 1 | 18 | 3 | 2 | 0 | – | | 20 | 3 |
| Tochigi City FC | 2024 | Japan Football League | 25 | 6 | 2 | 0 | – | | 27 | 6 |
| Tochigi City FC | 2025 | J3 League | 1 | 0 | 0 | 0 | 0 | 0 | 1 | 0 |
| Career total | | | 282 | 33 | 15 | 4 | 0 | 0 | 297 | 37 |

== Honours ==
Zweigen Kanazawa

- J3 League: 2014
- Ishikawa Football Championship: 2014

Matsumoto Yamaga

- Nagano Football Championship: 2022

Tochigi City FC

- Japanese Regional Football Champions League: 2023
- Japan Football League: 2024
