= Kiyokawa =

Kiyokawa may refer to:

== Places ==
- Kiyokawa, Kanagawa, a village in Kanagawa Prefecture, Japan
- Kiyokawa, Ōita, a former village in Ōno District, Ōita Prefecture, Japan
- Kiyokawa Station, a railway station in Shōnai, Yamagata Prefecture, Japan

== Other uses ==
- Kiyokawa (surname), a Japanese surname
