= Shungo Tamashiro =

Japanese footballer

Shungo Tamashiro 玉城 峻吾
Personal information
- Full name: Shungo Tamashiro
- Date of birth: 25 April 1991 (age 35)
- Place of birth: Adachi, Tokyo, Japan
- Height: 1.67 m (5 ft 5 1/2 in)
- Position: Midfielder

Team information
- Current team: Nankatsu SC
- Number: 19

Youth career
- 2004–2009: Mitsubishi Yowa

College career
Years	Team	Apps	(Gls)
2010–2014	University of Tsukuba		

Senior career*
Years	Team	Apps	(Gls)
2015–2016	Zweigen Kanazawa	17	(0)
2017–2021	FC Imabari	118	(13)
2022–	Nankatsu SC	36	(4)
- * Club domestic league appearances and goals as of 2 February 2025, 1:20 (UTC)

Shungo Tamashiro (玉城 峻吾, Tamashiro Shungo; born April 25, 1991 in Adachi, Tokyo) is a Japanese football player who plays as a Left Midfileder and currently play for Nankatsu SC.

== Career ==
=== Youth career ===
In 2009, while he was a member youth team of Mitsubishi Yowa SC, he was selected as a candidate for the Japan U-18 national football team. In 2010, he entered the University of Tsukuba and played under coach Yahiro Kazama, Tamashiro wearing this number 10 in jersey from third year.

=== Senior career ===
On 27 December 2014, Tamashiro joined first professional career with Zweigen Kanazawa from 2015 season. After 2016 season, he left the club when his contract expired.

On 17 January 2017, Tamashiro joined to JFL club, FC Imabari on a permanent transfer.

On 3 December 2021, Tamashiro leave for this club after contract in Imabari has been ended. On December 10 of the same year, he participated in the J.League joint tryouts held at Fukuda Denshi Arena.

On 8 January 2022, Tamashiro was announce official transfer to Nankatsu SC for 2022 season.

== Career statistics ==
=== Club ===
As of the start for 2025 season.

Club performance			League		Cup		League Cup		Other		Total	
Season	Club	League	Apps	Goals	Apps	Goals	Apps	Goals	Apps	Goals	Apps	Goals
Japan			League		Emperor's Cup		J.League Cup		Other		Total	
2015	Zweigen Kanazawa	J2 League	8	0	1	2	–				9	2
2016	Zweigen Kanazawa	J2 League	9	0	2	0	–				11	0
2017	FC Imabari	JFL	29	1	2	0	–				31	1
2018	FC Imabari	JFL	29	4	2	0	–				31	4
2019	FC Imabari	JFL	14	1	–		–				14	1
2020	FC Imabari	J3 League	29	5	0	0	–				29	5
2021	FC Imabari	J3 League	17	2	2	0	–				19	2
2022	Nankatsu SC	Kantō Div 1	10	0	–				1 (Note: All Japan Senior Football Championship)	0	11	0
2023	Nankatsu SC	Kantō Div 1	15	2	–				–		15	2
2024	Nankatsu SC	Kantō Div 1	11	2	–				–		11	2
2025	Nankatsu SC	Kantō Div 1	0	0	–				–		0	0
Career total			145	17	13	2	–		1	0	158	19
