= Kiyokawa (surname) =

Kiyokawa (written: 清川) is a Japanese surname. Notable people with the surname include:

- Asami Kiyokawa (清川 あさみ), Japanese embroidery artist
- Hiroyuki Kiyokawa (清川 浩行, born 1967), Japanese footballer and manager
- Masaji Kiyokawa (清川 正二, 1913–1999), Japanese businessman, sports administrator and swimmer
- Motomu Kiyokawa (清川 元夢, 1935–2022), Japanese actor and voice actor
- Sasuga Kiyokawa (清川 流石, born 1996), Japanese footballer
- Suguru Kiyokawa (清川 卓, born 1978), Japanese bobsledder
