= Kazuma Kuwata =

Japanese footballer

Kazuma Kuwata 鍬田 一雅
Personal information
- Date of birth: 20 April 2000 (age 26)
- Place of birth: Saga, Japan
- Height: 1.76 m (5 ft 9 in)
- Position: Midfielder

Team information
- Current team: Nankatsu SC
- Number: 7

Youth career
- VALENTIA
- Ryukoku High School
- 2017: RAFA
- 2018: Alcorcón
- 2019–2020: Lugo Fuenlabrada

Senior career*
Years	Team	Apps	(Gls)
2021	SC Sagamihara	0	(0)
2022–2024	Joyful Honda Tsukuba	51	(12)
2025–	Nankatsu SC	0	(0)
- * Club domestic league appearances and goals as of 1 February 2025, 10:00 (UTC)

Kazuma Kuwata (鍬田 一雅, Kuwata Kazuma; born 20 April 2000) is a Japanese footballer who playing as a midfielder and currently play for Nankatsu SC.

== Career ==
On 5 February 2022, Kuwata was announce joining to Kantō Soccer League club, Joyful Honda Tsukuba for 2022 season.

On 25 December 2024, Kuwata was announce official transfer to fellow Kantō club, Nankatsu SC from 2025 season.

== Career statistics ==
=== Club ===
As of the start for 2025 season.

Club	Season	League			National Cup		League Cup		Other		Total	
Club	Season	Division	Apps	Goals	Apps	Goals	Apps	Goals	Apps	Goals	Apps	Goals
SC Sagamihara	2021	J2 League	0	0	1 (Note: Appearances in the Emperor's Cup)	0	0	0	0	0	1	0
Joyful Honda Tsukuba	2022	Kantō Soccer League Div 1	15	1	0	0	0	0	1 (Note: Appearances in the All Japan Senior Football Championship)	0	16	1
Joyful Honda Tsukuba	2023	Kantō Soccer League Div 1	18	5	0	0	0	0	9 (Note: Appearances in the Japanese Regional Football Champions League)	2	27	7
Joyful Honda Tsukuba	2024	Kantō Soccer League Div 1	18	6	0	0	0	0	0	0	18	6
Nankatsu SC	2025	Kantō Soccer League Div 1	0	0	0	0	0	0	0	0	0	0
Career total			51	12	1	0	0	0	10	2	62	14
