= Belugarosso Iwami =

Japanese football club

Belugarosso Iwami ベルガロッソいわみ
- Full name: Belugarosso Iwami
- Founded: 1977; 48 years ago
- Ground: Shimane Football Arena; Sun Village Hamada Football Ground
- Capacity: 6,000 (SF); 2,000 (SV)
- Manager: Shota Sakamoto
- League: Chūgoku Soccer League
- 2024: 3rd of 10
- Website: belugarosso2020.com

Belugarosso Iwami (ベルガロッソいわみ, Berugarosso Iwami) are a Japanese football club based on the Iwami region of Shimane Prefecture (Hamada, Masuda, Ota, Kawamoto, Misato, Onan, Ochi, Tsuwano, Yoshika.) They play in the Chūgoku Soccer League, one of Japan's fifth tier leagues, which is part of Japanese Regional Leagues.

== History ==
The club was founded in 1977 as Bunkers. In 2002, they were promoted to the second division of the Shimane Prefecture Adult Soccer League. In 2004, the club were promoted to the Shimane Prefecture League 1st Division. In 2005 the club changed their name to Hamada FC Cosmos.

In 2009, the club won their first Shimane Football Championship beating Dezzolla Shimane in the final, which serves as one of the Emperor's Cup preliminary rounds, earning the right to debut in the main football cup competition of the country. They were defeated in their first match against NIFS Kanoya.

In 2010, the club debuted at the All Japan Club Teams Football Tournament, a cup competition for teams playing prefectural league football. The club also participated in it the following year, and in 2017. On all occasions, they failed to progress further, having not went past the second round of the competition.

In 2018, the club won their third title at the Shimane Prefecture League 1st Division and earned to the promotion to the Chugoku Soccer League.

In 2020 the club changed its name to Belugarosso Hamada.

In 2023, they qualified for the Emperor's Cup for the first time in 14 years, but were eliminated in first round by Kochi United, losing by 1–2.

In 2023 the club changed its name to Belugarosso Iwami.

== Names throughout history ==
- 1977–2004: Bunkers
- 2005–2019: Hamada FC Cosmos
- 2020–2022: Belugarosso Hamada ("Belugarosso" comes from the Italian word "beluga", which means the famous beluga whale at Shimane Aquarium Aquas, and the Italian word "rosso", which means red, said to represent the image of the setting sun and passion of Hamada.)
- 2023– : Belugarosso Iwami (The name change came alongside a hometown move, from just comprising the Hamada City to the entire Iwami region.)

== League and Cup record ==
Champions	Runners-up	Third place	Promoted	Relegated

League											Emperor's Cup	Shakaijin Cup
Season	Division	Pos.	P	W	D	L	F	A	GD	Pts	Emperor's Cup	Shakaijin Cup
As Hamada FC Cosmos
2017	Shimane Prefecture Division 1	3rd	10	6	1	3	17	12	5	19	Did not qualify	
2018	Shimane Prefecture Division 1	1st	10	7	3	0	34	6	28	24	Did not qualify	
2019	Chūgoku Soccer League	8th	18	2	6	10	20	52	-32	12	Did not qualify	
As Belugarosso Hamada
2020	Chūgoku Soccer League	League season cancelled because of COVID-19.									Did not qualify	Not played due to COVID-19
2021	Chūgoku Soccer League	4th	16	7	2	7	27	25	2	23	Did not qualify	Not played due to COVID-19
2022	Chūgoku Soccer League	3rd	18	10	4	4	43	19	24	34	Did not qualify	Round of 32
As Belugarosso Iwami
2023	Chūgoku Soccer League	4th	18	12	0	6	60	19	41	36	1st round	Round of 32
2024	Chūgoku Soccer League	3rd	18	10	5	3	45	17	28	35	1st round	Round of 32
2025	Chūgoku Soccer League	2nd	18	11	5	2	45	11	34	38	1st round	
2026	Chūgoku Soccer League	TBD	18								TBD	

Key

- Pos. = Position in league; P = Games played; W = Games won; D = Games drawn; L = Games lost; F = Goals scored; A = Goals conceded; GD = Goal difference; Pts = Points won

== Honours ==
Belugarosso Iwami honours
Honour	No.	Years
Shimane Football League 1st Division	3	2007, 2015, 2018
Shimane Prefectural Football Championship Emperor's Cup Shimane Prefectural Qualifiers	4	2009, 2023, 2024, 2025

== Players and staff ==
=== Current squad ===
As of 30 April 2024.

Note: Flags indicate national team as defined under FIFA eligibility rules; some limited exceptions apply. Players may hold more than one non-FIFA nationality.

No.	Pos.	Nation	Player
2	MF	JPN	Riku Sawada
3	DF	JPN	Yusuke Tsujikawa
4	DF	JPN	Daiki Morimoto
5	DF	JPN	Masaki Tanaka
6	DF	JPN	Sho Abe
7	MF	JPN	Yu Nagatani
8	MF	JPN	Shotaro Kawakita
9	FW	JPN	Ryotaro Fuke
10	MF	JPN	Sota Suizu
11	FW	JPN	Ryota Kawaraji
13	FW	JPN	Mirai Fujimoto
14	MF	JPN	Reo Nakamura
15	DF	JPN	Shohei Hasegawa
16	MF	JPN	Takayuki Sone

No.	Pos.	Nation	Player
17	MF	JPN	Ryo Tokuda
18	MF	JPN	Hiro Kaneda
19	FW	JPN	Reo Ino
20	MF	JPN	Genki Shiorayama
21	MF	JPN	Akira Sawashima
22	FW	JPN	Genta Uchiyama
24	MF	JPN	Riku Kawamitsu
25	DF	JPN	Michi Nagaoka
27	MF	JPN	Mizuki Nishitani
30	GK	JPN	Yuto Kido
31	GK	JPN	Shoto Ikefuji
33	DF	JPN	Jun Kitamura
35	MF	JPN	Yuzuru Tabira

=== Current staff ===
As of 30 April 2024.

Position	Name
Manager	(Japan) Hiroki Kishimoto
Assistant manager	(Japan) Shohei Suzuki
Staff manager	(Japan) Daiki Fujikawa
Goalkeeping coach	(Japan) Katsuhisa Suzuki
Athletic coach and trainer	(Japan) Yuji Takee
Chief trainer	(Japan) Wataru Nishikori
Trainer	(Japan) Shota Sasaki (Japan) Naoki Ishihara
