= Wyvern FC =

Japanese football club

Wyvern FC ワイヴァン FC
- Full name: Wyvern Football Club
- Founded: 2015; 11 years ago
- Ground: Nagoya Minato Stadium (Nagoya, Aichi); Green Ground Kariya (Kariya, Aichi)
- Capacity: 20,000; 2,000
- Manager: Shinnosuke Okada
- League: Tōkai League Div. 1
- 2023: Div. 2, 1st of 9 (Promoted as champions)
- Website: fcwyvern.com

WYVERN FC (ワイヴァン FC, Waivuan Efu Shi), known mononymously as wyvern, are a Japanese football club based in Kariya, Aichi. The club plays in the Tōkai Adult Soccer League 1st division.

== History ==
The club was founded on 2015 by Nobuo Nasu, starting to play from the District Leagues, as Wyvern FC. The club's name originates from a legendary two-leg winged dragon, the Wyvern, which appears in many different schools or athletic teams around the world as logos, or mascots. The club is said to accurately portray the aggressiveness of the dragons in their playing style, but in high spirits, as the team tends to show energetic and many goal-scoring displays.

The club played from 2015 to 2017 at the West Mikawa District League, before earning promotion for the Aichi Prefectural League. Back-to-back promotions from the 3rd to the 1st division of the prefecture saw them quickly win promotion to the Regional Leagues. In the meantime, the club won the Kariya Prefectural Cup on 2019, while being a 2nd division club at the prefecture league system.

Starting from the 2nd regional division on 2021, their campaign was cut short by the season cancellation, after COVID-19 forced multiple match postponements during the season. As the Japanese football could resume for the first time in three year under the reduced COVID-19 threat, the club was able to make a nearly unbeaten run in the two major competitions the club played in. At the 2022, they won 46 out of 48 possible points, having won their first 14 consecutive matches during the league season, having only failed to win a match on the penultimate league round against Nagoya SC in a 1–1 draw. Nevertheless, with a 12-point gap off the runners-up, the club became 2nd division champions, and then were promoted to the 1st division. Wyvern came close to win the 2022 edition of the Kariya Prefectural Cup, having lost the final on penalty shoot-outs against FC Kariya.

== Stadiums ==
They use four different facilities to train. UB Kariya Highway Soccer/Futsal Field (Toyota); UB Tokai Futsal Club (Toyota); Minato Aquilles UB Futsal Field (Nagoya); and UB Creative Base (Kariya).

During the 2022 season, however, the club used two different venues to host their home matches at the Tokai Soccer League 2nd Division: Nagoya Minato Stadium (Nagoya) and Green Ground Kariya (Kariya).

== League and cup record ==
Champions	Runners-up	Third place	Promoted	Relegated

League												Emperor's Cup	Shakaijin Cup
Season	Division	Tier	Pos.	GP	W	D	L	F	A	GD	Pts	Emperor's Cup	Shakaijin Cup
2015	West Mikawa Soccer League Div.2	11	1st	12	10	1	1	64	9	55	31	Did not qualify	Did not qualify
2016	West Mikawa Soccer League Div.1	10										Did not qualify	Did not qualify
2017	West Mikawa Soccer League Div.1	10	1st	13	10	3	0	67	21	46	33	Did not qualify	Did not qualify
2018	Aichi Prefectural Soccer League Div. 3	9	1st	12	12	0	0	81	8	73	36	Did not qualify	Did not qualify
2019	Aichi Prefectural Soccer League Div. 2	8	1st	16	16	0	0	54	16	38	48	Did not qualify	Did not qualify
2020	Aichi Prefectural Soccer League Div. 1	7	1st	8	6	1	1	23	7	16	19	Did not qualify	Did not qualify
2021	Tōkai Adult Soccer League Div. 2	6	2nd (Note: Respecting COVID-19 safety guidelines, the Tokai FA decided the 2021 season to be cancelled, as many matches needed to be postponed)	7	6	0	1	16	6	10	18	Did not qualify	Did not qualify
2022	Tōkai Adult Soccer League Div. 2	6	1st	16	15	1	0	85	6	79	46	Did not qualify	Did not qualify
2023	Tōkai Adult Soccer League Div. 1	5	1st	14	10	4	0	34	8	26	34	Did not qualify	Round of 16
2024	Tōkai Adult Soccer League Div. 1	5	3rd	14	8	1	5	21	15	6	25	Did not qualify	
2025	Tōkai Adult Soccer League Div. 1	5	6th	14	3	6	5	12	15	−3	15	Did not qualify	
2026	Tōkai Adult Soccer League Div. 1	5	TBD	14									

- Source: WYVERN Game Record

Key

- Pos. = Position in league; GP = Games played; W = Games won; D = Games drawn; L = Games lost; F = Goals scored; A = Goals conceded; GD = Goals difference; Pts = Points gained

== Honours ==
Wyvern FC honours
Honour	No.	Years
West Mikawa Soccer League Division 2	1	2015
Aichi Prefectural Soccer Tournament Preliminaries	1	2016
West Mikawa Soccer League Division 1	1	2017
Aichi Prefectural Soccer League Division 3	1	2018
Aichi Prefectural Soccer League Division 2	1	2019
Kariya Prefectural Soccer Tournament	1	2019
Aichi Prefectural Soccer League Division 1	1	2020
Tōkai Adult Soccer League Division 2	1	2022
Tōkai Adult Soccer League Division 1	1	2023

== Current squad ==
As of 23 August 2023.

Note: Flags indicate national team as defined under FIFA eligibility rules; some limited exceptions apply. Players may hold more than one non-FIFA nationality.

No.	Pos.	Nation	Player
1	GK	JPN	Satoshi Tokizawa
2	DF	JPN	Riku Arai
3	DF	JPN	Sho Nakamura
4	MF	JPN	Shinnosuke Okada
5	DF	JPN	Shohei Hasegawa
6	MF	JPN	Sho Aoki
7	FW	JPN	Daiki Yamamoto
8	MF	JPN	Hiroki Sekido
9	MF	JPN	Masahi Sakai
10	FW	JPN	Yusei Fukushima
11	FW	BRA	Leozinho
12	GK	BRA	Vinícius Gobetti
14	DF	JPN	Eishiro Kanda
15	FW	JPN	Takafumi Shimizu

No.	Pos.	Nation	Player
16	GK	JPN	Ryo Ishii
17	MF	JPN	Yuta Tamura
18	FW	JPN	Tatsuki Hamada
20	MF	JPN	Shoma Nagata
22	MF	JPN	Kei Ito
23	FW	JPN	Itsuki Nishihara
24	DF	JPN	Daichi Matsubara
25	MF	JPN	Yusuke Taniguchi
26	DF	JPN	Ren Kano
32	GK	JPN	Hiroyuki Tsuchiya
33	MF	JPN	Kota Kato
34	DF	JPN	Hiroto Matsubara
35	FW	JPN	Tomohiro Tsuda

== Club officials ==
Position	Name
Manager	(Japan) Shinnosuke Okada
VID	(Japan) Noriyuki Yamashita
Strengthening manager	(Japan) Kiyoshi Masuda
Academy director	(Japan) Tetsuya Asano
Academy coach	(Japan) Masashi Sakai
Staff	(Japan) Seiichi Ogawa
U-15 manager and Junior Youth supervisor	(Japan) Atsuya Tanizawa
First-team coach	(Japan) Atsushi Miyazaki
Doctor	(Japan) Daisuke Takano
Trainer	(Japan) Kazue Hozumi

== Managerial history ==
As of 1 September 2021

Manager	Nationality	Tenure	
Manager	Nationality	Start	Finish
Seiichi Ogawa	Japan	1 September 2021	present
