= Masaya Suzuki =

Japanese footballer

Masaya Suzuki 鈴木 将也
Personal information
- Full name: Masaya Suzuki
- Date of birth: May 9, 1988 (age 38)
- Place of birth: Yokosuka, Kanagawa, Japan
- Height: 1.77 m (5 ft 9 1/2 in)
- Position: Midfielder

Team information
- Current team: Toho Titanium
- Number: 7

Youth career
- 2007–2010: Kanagawa University

Senior career*
Years	Team	Apps	(Gls)
2011	Mito HollyHock	6	(0)
2012–2014	SC Sagamihara	55	(3)
2015–2017	Azul Claro Numazu	74	(6)
2018–	Toho Titanium		
- * Club domestic league appearances and goals as of 23 February 2018

Masaya Suzuki (鈴木 将也, Suzuki Masaya; born May 9, 1988) is a Japanese football player for Toho Titanium.

== Club statistics ==
Updated to 23 February 2018.

Club performance			League		Cup		Total	
Season	Club	League	Apps	Goals	Apps	Goals	Apps	Goals
Japan			League		Emperor's Cup		Total	
2011	Mito HollyHock	J2 League	6	0	0	0	6	0
2012	SC Sagamihara	JRL (Kanto, Div. 1)	16	3	–		16	3
2013	SC Sagamihara	JFL	28	0	–		28	0
2014	SC Sagamihara	J3 League	11	0	–		11	0
2015	Azul Claro Numazu	JFL	29	3	–		29	3
2016	Azul Claro Numazu	JFL	28	3	–		28	3
2017	Azul Claro Numazu	J3 League	17	0	1	0	18	0
Total			135	9	1	0	136	9
