= Nankatsu SC =

Japanese football club

Nankatsu SC 南葛SC
- Full name: Nankatsu Sports Club
- Founded: 1983; 43 years ago as Tokiwa Club
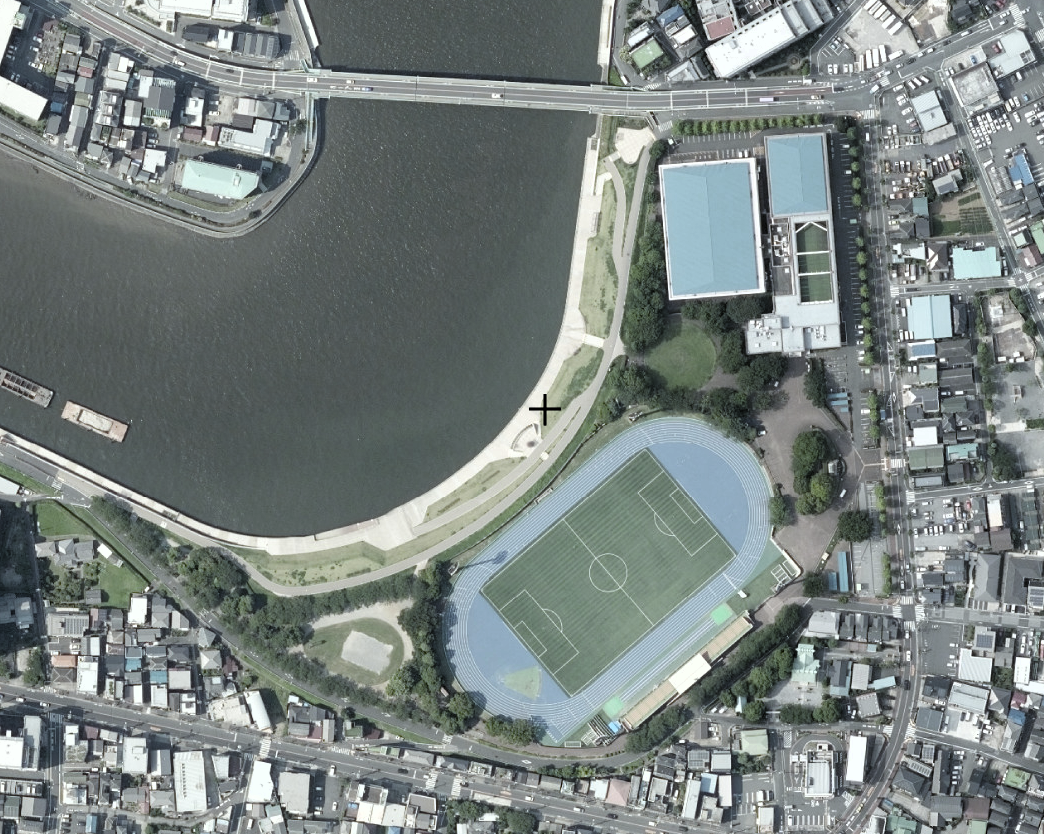
- Ground: Okudo Sports Center Park; Katsushika, Tokyo
- Owner(s): Nankatsu Co., Ltd.
- Chairman: (Japan) Yōichi Takahashi
- Manager: (Japan) Yahiro Kazama
- League: Kantō Soccer League (Div. 1)
- 2025: 2nd of 10
- Website: nankatsu-sc.com
Home colours	Away colours

Nankatsu Sports Club (南葛スポーツクラブ, Nankatsu Supōtsukurabu), commonly known as Nankatsu SC (南葛SC, Nankatsu Esu Shī) are a Japanese football club based in Katsushika, Tokyo. They currently play in the Kantō Soccer League Division 1, part of Japanese Regional Leagues. As the club aims for a future qualification to the J.League, they currently hold the J.League 100 Year Plan status.

== History ==
The club's origin dates back to 1983. In those days, the club mainly centered its attention on Tokiwa Junior High School alumni who wanted to play for the club, inserting a certain influence on the club, which ended up naming themselves Tokiwa Club. The club joined the Tokyo Adult Soccer League, and was promoted to its 2nd Division in 1994. The club repeatedly switched between the second and third division, as the club couldn't gain consistency in a higher-level league. In 2011, the Katsushika Ward Football Federation established the NPO International Football Promotion Association, which is an organization under the Federation for clubs aiming to join the J.League. Tokiwa Club, as it was called at the time, became an affiliate.

The club was renamed in 2012, becoming Katsushika Vitoard (葛飾ヴィトアード). In 2013, the club welcomed Yōichi Takahashi as the new president, renaming the club as Nankatsu SC, in allusion to the school team of the protagonist of Takahashi's globally famous manga and anime Captain Tsubasa, which attracted the attention of many young people in Japan, and culminated in an increasing rise of interest about football in the nation. They established an U-12 team for elementary school students in 2013, and an U-15 team for junior high school students in 2015. From 2015 to 2017, they signed partnerships with Nankatsu SC Fukuoka, SC Sagamihara, and CE Sabadell FC.

In January 2019, Nankatsu SC Co. Ltd was established to operate the first-team, transferring the team's management. The following year, they were approved as a member of the J.League 100 Year Plan, alongside Vonds Ichihara, FC Osaka, Veertien Mie and Iwaki FC.

On 14 July 2021, Valuence Holdings acquired 33,5% of the Nankatsu SC Co. Ltd. shares (the other 66.5% remained in the ownership of Yōichi Takahashi). In addition, Shinsuke Sakimoto, then Valuence Holdings CEO, became Nankatsu SC Co. Ltd. president. The same year (2021), Nankatsu SC, who were then a newly promoted team from the Tokyo Metropolitan League, making at the time its regional debut, were promoted from the Kanto Soccer League 2nd division, finishing as 2021 runners-up.

In the 2022 season, they played in the Kanto Soccer League 1st division, successfully avoiding relegation, despite being threatened by it several times during the league season. Nankatsu made their debut at the Shakaijin Cup on 2022. Their first match on the competition was a win against FC Tokushima by 1–0, with their lone goal scored by center-back Deivisson. Their second match was the debut's opposite, as this time they lost the match by 1–0 against Veroskronos Tsuno, forcing them to early exit the tournament at the Round of 16.

In the 2023 season, they continued to play in the KSL's 1st division, and ended up mid-table. Nankatsu SC was not able to make any other national appearances during the year, as they failed to qualify for the Emperor's Cup, Shakaijin Cup and the Regional Champions League.

In 2024, they are playing their third consecutive season in Kanto's top division, a feat shared between them and their women's team. To qualify for the Emperor's Cup, clubs in Tokyo have to win the Tokyo Soccer Championship. To qualify for the tournament, non-university teams from regional and prefectural leagues needs at least to be a finalist in Tokyo Senior Championship. Fortunately for Nankatsu, they managed to win the title following a 5–2 triumph over Aries Tokyo FC. This win qualified them to the aforementioned Tokyo Soccer Championship. Starting on the first round in the six-team tournament, they were paired with JFL club Yokogawa Musashino FC. If they won the match, they would be playing against Waseda University's football club, who were seeded in the semi-final. Emperor's Cup aspiration came soon to a halt for Nankatsu SC, as they lost by 2–0 their match against Yokogawa Musashino FC. From July onwards, they played in the Shakaijin Cup qualifiers, in hopes of appearing in the national-level scene once again.

== Current squad ==
As of 17 March 2025.

Note: Flags indicate national team as defined under FIFA eligibility rules; some limited exceptions apply. Players may hold more than one non-FIFA nationality.

No.	Pos.	Nation	Player
1	GK	JPN	Masamichi Iiyoshi
2	DF	JPN	Takeru Nagashima
3	DF	JPN	Jamie Pattison
4	DF	JPN	Ryu Yuwon (vice-captain)
6	MF	JPN	Kota Nakamura
7	MF	JPN	Kazuma Kuwata
8	MF	JPN	Ryuya Saegusa
9	MF	JPN	Kaimu Ogo
11	FW	JPN	Masaya Kato
13	FW	JPN	Yuga Fukumoto
14	MF	JPN	Reo Konishi
15	MF	JPN	Yasuyuki Konno
16	MF	JPN	Gaku Kato
17	MF	JPN	Tatsuya Sasaki (vice-captain)
18	MF	JPN	Koki Kanda
19	MF	JPN	Shungo Tamashiro

No.	Pos.	Nation	Player
21	MF	JPN	Keito Doi
22	FW	JPN	Rei Okuhara
23	FW	JPN	Shinnosuke Kinoshita
24	DF	JPN	Daiki Tanaka
25	FW	JPN	Masaki Oishi
29	MF	JPN	Koki Takeda
37	GK	JPN	Keita Toyama
39	FW	JPN	Daito Ojima
41	GK	JPN	Yu Fukumoto
42	GK	JPN	Yusuke Goto
77	FW	JPN	Jhonattan Matsuoka
87	DF	JPN	Taika Ushida
88	FW	JPN	Genki Omae (captain)
97	MF	JPN	Shinpei Yamagami
99	FW	JPN	Andre Taiki Kinjo

== Coaching staff ==
As of the 2025 season.

Position	Staff
Manager	(Japan) Yahiro Kazama
Assistant manager	(Japan) Kenji Takagi
Assistant Technical director	(Japan) Kenta Shimaoka
Goalkeeper coach	(Japan) Kiyomitsu Kobari
Physical coach	(Japan) Hidemasa Kawasaki
Coach and analyst	(Japan) Kyosuke Horio
Trainer	(Japan) Keito Kurosawa (Japan) Haruya Onodera
Vice Minister	(Japan) Sakito Furuwa
Side manager	(Japan) Shuji Kohata
Athletic trainer	(Japan) Sentaro Kananari
General Manager	(Japan) Yoshihiro Iwamoto
Assistant general manager	(Japan) Ryo Hatada
Sleep coach	(Japan) Tatsuto Yano

== League record ==
Champions	Runners-up	Third place	Promoted	Relegated

League								Emperor's Cup	Shakaijin Cup
Season	Division	Position	P	W	D	L	Pts	Emperor's Cup	Shakaijin Cup
2004	Tokyo Metropolitan League (3rd Div.)	9th	11	3	0	8	9		
2005	Tokyo Metropolitan League (3rd Div.)	2nd	10	9	0	1	27		
2006	Tokyo Metropolitan League (3rd Div.)	1st	10	9	1	0	28		
2007	Tokyo Metropolitan League (2nd Div.)	11th	11	1	3	7	6		
2008	Tokyo Metropolitan League (3rd Div.)	2nd	10	7	1	2	22		
2009	Tokyo Metropolitan League (3rd Div.)	5th	11	6	1	4	19		
2010	Tokyo Metropolitan League (3rd Div.)	3rd	10	6	0	4	18		
2011	Tokyo Metropolitan League (3rd Div.)	4th	10	5	1	4	16		
2012	Tokyo Metropolitan League (3rd Div.)	4th	10	5	3	2	18		
2013	Tokyo Metropolitan League (3rd Div.)	2nd	11	9	1	1	28		
2014	Tokyo Metropolitan League (3rd Div.)	2nd	11	9	0	2	27		
2015	Tokyo Metropolitan League (3rd Div.)	1st	11	11	0	0	33		
2016	Tokyo Metropolitan League (2nd Div.)	2nd	13	9	1	3	28		
2017	Tokyo Metropolitan League (2nd Div.)	1st	13	11	1	1	34		
2018	Tokyo Metropolitan League (1st Div.)	1st	15	13	1	1	40		
2019	Tokyo Metropolitan League (1st Div.)	7th	15	6	4	5	22		
2020	Tokyo Metropolitan League (1st Div.)	1st	7	5	1	1	16		
2021	Kanto Soccer League (2nd Div.)	2nd	18	10	6	2	36		
2022	Kanto Soccer League (1st Div.)	7th	18	4	7	7	19		
2023	Kanto Soccer League (1st Div.)	6th	18	6	4	8	22		
2024	Kanto Soccer League (1st Div.)	6th	18	6	4	8	22		
2025	Kanto Soccer League (1st Div.)	2nd	18	15	0	3	45		
2026	Kanto Soccer League (1st Div.)	TBD	18						

Key

- Pos. = Position in league; P = Games played; W = Games won; D = Games drawn; L = Games lost; Pts = Points gained

== Honours ==
Nankatsu SC honours
Honour	No.	Years
Tokyo Metropolitan League	2	2018, 2020
Kantō Soccer League	1	2020

== Nankatsu SC Wings ==
The club has also a women's football section, under the name Nankatsu SC WINGS. It was founded on 2014. They started from Tokyo Metropolitan Women Football League's 5th division, but got three back-to-back promotions, then making their 1st division debut early on 2018. Earning promotion from the Metropolitan League, they entered the Kanto Soccer League on 2021, playing on the 2nd division. Another back-to-back promotion saw them jumping to the 1st division, starting from the 2022 season. As of 2024, they are in their third consecutive season at Kanto's top division.

Since 2024, Nankatsu SC Wings also have U-18 and U-15 squads. Their youth categories were formerly part of INAC Tokyo, operated by nonprofit organization INAC, which operates in Tokyo as a training organization under the direct control of INAC Kobe Leonessa. Following the affiliation, INAC Tokyo Leoncina became Nankatsu SC Wings U-18 and INAC Tokyo Femina became Nankatsu SC Wings U-15.

=== Current squad ===
As of 13 April 2024.

Note: Flags indicate national team as defined under FIFA eligibility rules; some limited exceptions apply. Players may hold more than one non-FIFA nationality.

No.	Pos.	Nation	Player
1	GK	JPN	Sumika Takahashi
2	DF	JPN	Sakura Soda (vice-captain)
3	DF	JPN	Tsutsumi Kaho
4	DF	JPN	Nodoka Hitomi (captain)
5	DF	JPN	Miwa Okawara
6	MF	JPN	Rima Takizawa
7	MF	JPN	Kasumi Ishikura
8	MF	JPN	Towa Kanno
9	FW	JPN	Erika Hirose
11	DF	JPN	Hikari Aizawa
13	FW	JPN	Mariko Nagaki (vice-captain)
14	MF	JPN	Mami Takahara
15	DF	JPN	Satsuki Kojima

No.	Pos.	Nation	Player
16	MF	JPN	Ai Nakahara
17	DF	JPN	Sachie Sato
18	MF	JPN	Yona Oh
19	FW	JPN	Ai Hasegawa
20	DF	JPN	Manami Okada
21	GK	JPN	Motoko Fujisawa
22	FW	JPN	Keito Monji
23	DF	JPN	Saaya Imai
24	MF	JPN	Ayano Horii
25	MF	JPN	Rina Ishii
26	DF	JPN	Haruse Sato
31	GK	JPN	Yoshimi Nakagawa
