= Arterivo Wakayama =

Japanese football club

Arterivo Wakayama アルテリーヴォ和歌山
- Full name: Arterivo Wakayama
- Nickname: Rivo
- Founded: 2007
- Ground: Kimiidera Athletic Stadium; Wakayama; Kinokawa City Togenkyo Sports Park Athletic Stadium; Kinokawa
- Capacity: 19,200 (Kimiidera); 780 (Kinokawa)
- Chairman: Kayako Kodama
- Manager: Eishi Kaizu
- League: Kansai Soccer League
- 2023: 1st of 8 (champions)
- Website: arterivo.com
Home colours	Away colours

Arterivo Wakayama (アルテリーヴォ和歌山, Aruterīvu~o Wakayama) is a football (soccer) club based in Wakayama, the capital city of Wakayama Prefecture in Japan. They play in the Kansai Soccer League, which is part of Japanese Regional Leagues. The name Arterivo comes from the combination of two Italian words: arte, meaning "art", and arrivo, meaning "arrival".

== History ==
They started with 30 volunteers to establish a J. League club: their final goal started in July 2007, when Arterivo Wakayama was officially registered as a football club. From 2008, Arterivo started climbing the Japanese football pyramid, reaching Kansai Soccer League in 2011, while getting their spot in Division 1 just the next season. They won Kansai Soccer League both in 2015 and 2016, but they're still waiting for a Japan Football League promotion.

Over the years, Arterivo has competed in various Emperor's Cup matches. Out of fifteen attempts, they have managed to advance to the second round or beyond on three separate occasions.

== League & cup record ==
Champions	Runners-up	Third place	Promoted	Relegated

League											Emperor's Cup	Shakaijin Cup
Season	Division	Position	P	W	D	L	F	A	GD	Pts	Emperor's Cup	Shakaijin Cup
2008	Wakayama; Prefecture (Div. 3)	1st	8	8	0	0	66	1	65	24		
2009	Wakayama; Prefecture (Div. 2)	1st	8	8	0	0	54	2	52	24	1st round	
2010	Wakayama; Prefecture (Div. 1)	1st	9	9	0	0	46	4	42	27	1st round	
2011	Kansai Soccer; League (Div. 2)	2nd	14	8	2	4	37	20	17	26	1st round	
2012	Kansai Soccer; League (Div. 1)	5th	14	4	5	5	11	20	-9	17	2nd round	
2013	Kansai Soccer; League (Div. 1)	6th	14	4	1	9	16	35	-19	13	1st round	
2014	Kansai Soccer; League (Div. 1)	3rd	14	7	2	5	30	23	7	23	1st round	Quarter-finals
2015	Kansai Soccer; League (Div. 1)	1st	14	11	0	3	27	13	14	33	1st round	Winners
2016	Kansai Soccer; League (Div. 1)	1st	14	11	1	2	36	11	25	34	1st round	
2017	Kansai Soccer; League (Div. 1)	3rd	14	8	0	6	23	18	5	24	1st round	Quarter-finals
2018	Kansai Soccer; League (Div. 1)	5th	14	6	2	6	22	24	-2	20	1st round	
2019	Kansai Soccer; League (Div. 1)	3rd	14	7	1	6	27	20	7	22	2nd round	1st round
2020 ‡	Kansai Soccer; League (Div. 1)	6th	7	2	2	3	9	15	-6	8	4th round	
2021	Kansai Soccer; League (Div. 1)	2nd	14	10	1	3	32	11	21	31	1st round	
2022	Kansai Soccer; League (Div. 1)	1st	14	9	2	3	24	11	13	29	1st round	Quarter-finals
2023	Kansai Soccer; League (Div. 1)	1st	14	9	4	1	22	10	12	31	1st round	Runners-up
2024	Kansai Soccer; League (Div. 1)	3rd	14	6	6	2	21	13	8	24	1st round	Round of 32
2025	Kansai Soccer; League (Div. 1)	1st	14	10	2	2	33	7	26	32	2nd round	TBD
2026	Kansai Soccer; League (Div. 1)	TBD	14								TBD	TBD

Key

- Pos. = Position in league; P = Games played; W = Games won; D = Games drawn; L = Games lost; F = Goals scored; A = Goals conceded; GD = Goals difference; Pts = Points gained
‡ Due to the spread of the coronavirus, all matches due to be played during the first half of the season were cancelled (7 rounds), only the second half of the league schedule was played.

== Honours ==
Arterivo Wakayama honours
Honour	No.	Years
Wakayama Football League Division 3	1	2008
Wakayama Football Championship Emperor's Cup Wakayama Prefectural Qualifiers	17	2009, 2010, 2011, 2012, 2013, 2014, 2015, 2016, 2017, 2018, 2019, 2020, 2021, 2022, 2023, 2024, 2025
Wakayama Football League Division 2	1	2009
Wakayama Football League Division 1	1	2010
Kansai Soccer League Division 1	5	2015, 2016, 2022, 2023, 2025
Shakaijin Cup	1	2015

== Current squad ==
As of 23 August 2023.

Note: Flags indicate national team as defined under FIFA eligibility rules; some limited exceptions apply. Players may hold more than one non-FIFA nationality.

No.	Pos.	Nation	Player
1	GK	JPN	Hironobu Yoshizaki
2	DF	JPN	Taishi Akazawa
3	DF	JPN	Yusei Ohashi
4	DF	JPN	Daichi Yamada
5	DF	JPN	Yuki Futatsugi
6	MF	JPN	Yuto Shibata
7	MF	JPN	Sho Horino
8	MF	JPN	Kento Kato
9	FW	JPN	Tatsuro Yamauchi
10	MF	JPN	Ryo Taguchi
11	FW	JPN	Junya Kitano
13	DF	JPN	Yuji Yoshitani

No.	Pos.	Nation	Player
14	MF	JPN	Masafumi Kiyomoto
15	FW	JPN	Haruki Shinjo
17	MF	JPN	Tomoya Seki
18	MF	JPN	Shuto Tatsuta
19	DF	JPN	Taiyo Kawano
20	MF	JPN	Toki Yamase
22	MF	JPN	Tessei Kinoshita
23	DF	JPN	Yuya Kokubo (captain)
24	MF	JPN	Koshiro Onda
26	MF	JPN	Ruka Baba
31	GK	JPN	Kenta Isobe
41	GK	JPN	Naotaka Ikegami
