= Kosuke Goto =

Japanese footballer (born 1994)

Kosuke Goto 後藤虹介
Personal information
- Full name: Kosuke Goto
- Date of birth: July 23, 1994 (age 32)
- Place of birth: Shizuoka, Japan
- Height: 1.78 m (5 ft 10 in)
- Position: Defender

Team information
- Current team: Azul Claro Numazu
- Number: 23

Youth career
- 2010–2012: Hiryu High School

College career
Years	Team	Apps	(Gls)
2013–2016	Osaka University H&SS		

Senior career*
Years	Team	Apps	(Gls)
2017–	Azul Claro Numazu	0	(0)
2017	→ Briobecca Urayasu (loan)	10	(1)
- * Club domestic league appearances and goals as of 22 February 2018

Kosuke Goto (後藤 虹介, Goto Kosuke; born, July 23, 1994) is a Japanese football player. He plays for Azul Claro Numazu.

== Career ==
Kosuke Goto joined J3 League club Azul Claro Numazu in 2017. On June 21, he debuted in Emperor's Cup (v Kyoto Sanga FC). In August, he moved to Briobecca Urayasu.

== Club statistics ==
Updated to 22 February 2018.

Appearances and goals by club, season and competition
Club	Season	League			Emperor's Cup		Total	
Club	Season	Division	Apps	Goals	Apps	Goals	Apps	Goals
Azul Claro Numazu	2017	J3 League	0	0	1	0	1	0
Briobecca Urayasu	2017	JFL	10	1	0	0	10	1
Total			10	1	1	0	11	1
