= Toho Titanium SC =

Japanese football club

Toho Titanium S.C.
- Full name: Toho Titanium; Soccer Club
- Founded: 1955; 71 years ago
- Stadium: Yanagishima Sports Park, Chigasaki, Kanagawa, Japan
- Manager: Nobuyuki Takeuchi
- League: Kantō Soccer League
- 2024 (Div. 1): 4th of 10
- Website: football.toho-titanium.co.jp
Home colours	Away colours

Toho Titanium Soccer Club is a Japanese football club based in Chigasaki, Kanagawa. The club has played in Japan Soccer League Division 2. It currently plays in the Kantō Soccer League, one of the nine leagues that makes part of the Japanese Regional Leagues, which corresponds as the 5th tier of Japanese football.

== Stadium ==
The club play most of its games at Yanagishima Sports Park, Kanagawa prefecture.

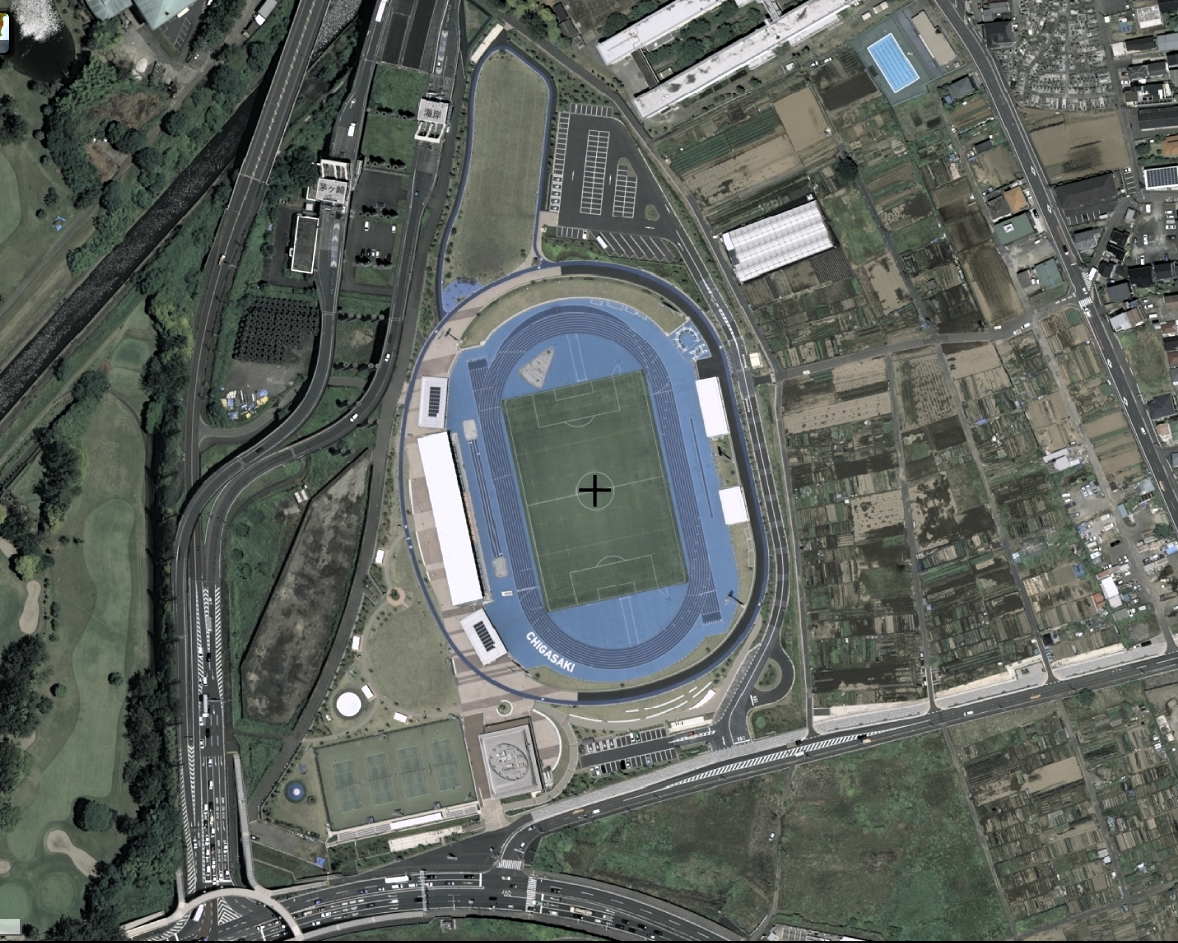

== Honours ==
Toho Titanium SC honours
Honour	No.	Years
Kanto Soccer League Division 1	4	1978, 1982, 1984, 1985
All Japan Adult Football Championship	1	1979
National Regional League Finals	1	1982
Kanagawa Prefectural Football Championship	1	2007
Kanto Soccer League Division 2	2	2010, 2021

== Squad ==
Updated to 23 August 2023.

Note: Flags indicate national team as defined under FIFA eligibility rules; some limited exceptions apply. Players may hold more than one non-FIFA nationality.

No.	Pos.	Nation	Player
1	GK	JPN	Kotaro Iba
2	DF	JPN	Hiroki Tanaka
3	DF	JPN	Ichiro Suzuki
4	DF	JPN	Yuta Komatsuzaki
5	DF	JPN	Ren Nagami
6	MF	JPN	Kazuki Togashi
7	DF	JPN	Daiki Koguchi
8	MF	JPN	Tomoki Jogataki
9	FW	JPN	Hidenori Iijima
10	MF	JPN	Akihiro Kawasaki
11	DF	JPN	So Fukasawa
12	GK	JPN	Yuga Oi
13	MF	JPN	Takeshi Kudo
14	DF	JPN	Kenshi Hashiguchi
15	DF	JPN	Masahiro Baba
16	FW	JPN	Ren Yoshida
17	MF	JPN	Kazuki Otsuka
18	FW	JPN	Takumi Shibuya

No.	Pos.	Nation	Player
19	MF	JPN	Raiki Harima
20	DF	JPN	Ryunosuke Nagaoka
21	FW	JPN	Shota Hiranobu
22	DF	JPN	Hiroki Takahashi
23	DF	JPN	Masatsugu Shibuya
24	MF	JPN	Sho Suzuki
25	MF	JPN	Seiya Katsuyama
27	MF	JPN	Hiroto Shirakawa
28	MF	JPN	Toi Komori
29	DF	JPN	Yu Tokiwa
30	FW	JPN	Masaki Matsuo
31	GK	JPN	Sota Chiba
33	MF	JPN	Sota Takatsuki
34	GK	JPN	Masahiro Moronuki
39	MF	JPN	Masaya Suzuki
41	MF	JPN	Kazuki Kono
44	MF	JPN	Tsubasa Endo
46	DF	JPN	Kodai Enomoto
