= 2023 Japanese Regional Leagues =

Japanese amateur leagues football season

Japanese Regional Leagues
- Season: 2023
- Promoted: Tochigi City FC

The 2023 Japanese Regional Leagues (Japanese: 2023 地域リーグ, Hepburn: 2023 Chiiki Rīgu) was the 58th edition of the Japanese Regional Leagues, the fifth tier of the Japanese football league system. The winners of the first division of each Regional League, along with other three best-placed teams of the Shakaijin Cup, qualified for the 2023 Regional Champions League, competing for a spot in the 2024 JFL.

== Champions list ==
Region	Champions
Hokkaido	BTOP Hokkaido
Tohoku	Blancdieu Hirosaki
Kantō	Vonds Ichihara
Hokushinetsu	Fukui United
Tōkai	Wyvern FC
Kansai	Arterivo Wakayama
Chūgoku	Fukuyama City
Shikoku	FC Tokushima
Kyushu	Veroskronos Tsuno

== Regional League Standings ==
=== Hokkaido ===
Pos	Team	Pld	W	D	L	GF	GA	GD	Pts	Qualification or relegation
1	BTOP Hokkaido (C, Q)	14	13	0	1	100	13	+87	39	Qualification for the 2023 Regional Champions League
2	Hokkaido Tokachi Sky Earth	14	13	0	1	79	9	+70	39	
3	Norbritz Hokkaido	14	9	0	5	40	29	+11	27	
4	Sapporo University Goal Plunderers	14	8	1	5	34	38	−4	25	
5	Hokushukai Iwamizawa	14	5	0	9	26	48	−22	15	
6	Kyokusyuukai FC	14	3	1	10	7	62	−55	10	
7	Sapporo FC (R)	14	2	2	10	9	37	−28	8	Relegated to Sapporo Block League
8	Nippon Express FC (R)	14	1	0	13	9	68	−59	3	Relegated to Sapporo Block League

Updated to match(es) played on 24 September 2023. Source: and (Hokkaido FA)
Rules for classification: 1) Points; 2) Goal difference; 3) Goals scored
(C) Champions; (Q) Qualified for the phase indicated; (R) Relegated

=== Tohoku ===
==== Division 1 ====
Pos	Team	Pld	W	D	L	GF	GA	GD	Pts	Qualification or relegation
1	Blancdieu Hirosaki (C, Q)	18	16	1	1	92	8	+84	49	Qualified for the 2023 Regional Champions League
2	Cobaltore Onagawa	18	16	1	1	68	11	+57	49	
3	Hitome Senbonzakura S.U.F.T	18	10	1	7	83	25	+58	31	
4	La Universidad de Sendai	18	9	1	8	35	26	+9	28	
5	Fuji Club 2003	18	9	1	8	37	39	−2	28	
6	Shichigahama FC	18	9	0	9	36	37	−1	27	
7	Ganju Iwate	18	7	3	8	26	34	−8	24	
8	Morioka Zebra	18	4	2	12	17	84	−67	14	
9	Nippon Steel Kamaishi (R)	18	4	1	13	10	54	−44	13	Relegated to Tohoku Division 2 North
10	Oshu United (R)	18	0	1	17	8	94	−86	1	Relegated to Tohoku Division 2 North

Source: Tohoku FA
Rules for classification: 1) Points; 2) Goal difference; 3) Goals scored
(C) Champions; (Q) Qualified for the phase indicated; (R) Relegated

==== Division 2 North ====
The season is divided in two phases, each club plays 1 game against every other team. After the first phase of matches, by which all clubs will have played nine games, the league splits into two halves - a 'top five section' and a 'bottom five section'. Each club plays a further four matches, one against each of the other four teams in their own section. Points achieved during the first phase of nice matches are carried forward to the second phase, but the teams compete only within their own sections during the second phase. After the first phase is completed, clubs cannot move out of their own half in the league, even if they achieve more or fewer points than a higher or lower ranked team, respectively.

Pos	Team	Pld	W	D	L	GF	GA	GD	Pts	Qualification or relegation
1	Bogolle D. Tsugaru (C, P)	13	11	1	1	52	11	+41	34	Promotion to Tohoku Division 1
2	Shichinohe SC	13	9	1	3	30	15	+15	28	
3	TDK Shinwakai	13	6	5	2	23	24	−1	23	
4	Akita FC Cambiare	13	5	2	6	25	24	+1	17	
5	Omiya SC	13	5	2	6	21	22	−1	17	
6	Saruta Kogyo	13	7	3	3	48	18	+30	24	
7	Kuzumaki Club	13	6	0	7	28	44	−16	18	
8	Lascivo Aomori (R)	13	4	0	9	26	43	−17	12	Relegated to Aomori Prefectural League
9	Hokuto Bank SC (R)	13	2	1	10	14	39	−25	7	Relegated to Akita Prefectural League
10	NewPearl Hiraizumi Maezawa (R)	13	2	1	10	15	42	−27	7	Relegated to Iwate Prefectural League

Updated to match(es) played on 1 October 2023. Source: Tohoku FA
Rules for classification: 1) Points; 2) Goal difference; 3) Goals scored
(C) Champions; (P) Promoted; (R) Relegated

==== Division 2 South ====
The season is divided in two phases, each club plays 1 game against every other team. After the first phase of matches, by which all clubs will have played nine games, the league splits into two halves - a 'top five section' and a 'bottom five section'. Each club plays a further four matches, one against each of the other four teams in their own section. Points achieved during the first phase of nice matches are carried forward to the second phase, but the teams compete only within their own sections during the second phase. After the first phase is completed, clubs cannot move out of their own half in the league, even if they achieve more or fewer points than a higher or lower ranked team, respectively.

Pos	Team	Pld	W	D	L	GF	GA	GD	Pts	Qualification or relegation
1	FC La U. de Sendai Second (C)	13	9	2	2	37	21	+16	29	Cannot be promoted
2	Michinoku Sendai (P)	13	8	2	3	38	14	+24	26	Promotion to Tohoku Division 1
3	Iwaki Furukawa	13	6	4	3	38	24	+14	22	
4	Oyama SC	13	5	3	5	26	21	+5	18	
5	Primeiro Fukushima	13	5	2	6	19	32	−13	17	
6	Sendai Sasuke	13	5	2	6	25	35	−10	17	
7	Merry	13	4	3	6	19	22	−3	15	
8	Ricoh Industry Tohoku	13	3	4	6	25	25	0	13	
9	Nagai Club (R)	13	2	7	4	19	27	−8	13	Participated in the playoff match and was relegated to the Yamagata Prefectural League.
10	Parafrente Yonezawa (R)	13	2	3	8	13	38	−25	9	Relegated to Yamagata Prefectural League

Updated to match(es) played on 24 September 2023. Source: Tohoku FA
Rules for classification: 1) Points; 2) Goal difference; 3) Goals scored
(C) Champions; (P) Promoted; (R) Relegated

==== Relegation / Promotion Playoff ====
3 December 2023
11:00

Nagai Club (Tohoku Division 2 South 9th place)	0–1	Chaneaule Koriyama (Fukushima Prefectural League champion)

Soma Koyo Soccer Stadium

※ Chaneaule Koriyama was promoted to the Tohoku 2nd Division South, and Nagai Club was relegated to the Yamagata Prefectural League.

3 December 2023
13:30

Nakaniida SC (Miyagi Prefectural League champion)	2–0	Mikawa SC (Yamagata Prefectural League champion)

Soma Koyo Soccer Stadium

※ Nakaniida SC was promoted to the Tohoku 2nd Division South.

=== Kantō ===
==== Division 1 ====
Division 1
Pos	Team	Pld	W	D	L	GF	GA	GD	Pts	Qualification or relegation
1	Vonds Ichihara (C, Q)	18	15	1	2	30	8	+22	46	Qualified for the 2023 Regional Champions League
2	Tochigi City (Note: Tochigi City FC's Regional Champions League participation was due to the supplementary quota of the J League 100 year plan club status) (P)	18	11	3	4	54	24	+30	36	Qualified for the 2023 Regional Champions League and was promoted to JFL
3	Tokyo United	18	9	5	4	27	19	+8	32	
4	Toho Titanium	18	6	6	6	17	15	+2	24	
5	Joyful Honda Tsukuba (Note: Joyful Honda Tsukuba FC was given a penalty of minus one point for issuing five or more warnings and sending offs in the 7th matchweek of the previous round.) (Note: Joyful Honda Tsukuba FC's Regional Champions League participation was based on the results of the 2023 Shakaijin Cup)	18	7	4	7	25	30	−5	24	Qualified for the 2023 Regional Champions League
6	Nankatsu SC	18	6	4	8	22	22	0	22	
7	Tokyo International University FC	18	6	4	8	28	31	−3	22	
8	Toin University of Yokohama FC	18	6	4	8	24	30	−6	22	
9	Tokyo 23 (Note: With Tochigi City FC's promotion to the JFL, Tokyo 23 FC, which was ranked 9th, escaped relegation to the second division, and remained in Kanto's first division for the next season.)	18	5	6	7	30	36	−6	21	
10	RKD Ryugasaki (R)	18	0	1	17	6	48	−42	1	Relegated to Kanto Division 2

Updated to match(es) played on 1 October 2023. Source: GoalNote
Rules for classification: 1) Points; 2) Goal difference; 3) Goals scored
(C) Champions; (P) Promoted; (Q) Qualified for the phase indicated; (R) Relegated

==== Division 2 ====
Division 2
Pos	Team	Pld	W	D	L	GF	GA	GD	Pts	Qualification or relegation
1	Aries Tokyo (C, P)	18	15	1	2	48	19	+29	46	Promoted to Kanto Division 1
2	Vertfee Yaita (P)	18	12	1	5	30	24	+6	37	Promoted to Kanto Division 1
3	Atsugi Hayabusa	18	9	3	6	25	20	+5	30	
4	Aventura Kawaguchi	18	8	2	8	28	25	+3	26	
5	Hitachi Building System SC	18	6	5	7	24	28	−4	23	
6	Esperanza SC (Note: Esperanza SC were deducted a point for issuing more than five warnings and sending off in the 7th match of the previous round.)	18	6	3	9	27	28	−1	20	
7	Tonan Maebashi	18	5	5	8	26	27	−1	20	
8	Yokohama Takeru	18	4	7	7	18	24	−6	19	
9	Sakai Trinitas	18	3	6	9	16	34	−18	15	
10	Identy Mirai (R)	18	3	5	10	8	21	−13	14	Relegated to Ibaraki Prefectural League

Updated to match(es) played on 1 October 2023. Source: GoalNote
Rules for classification: 1) Points; 2) Goal difference; 3) Goals scored
(C) Champions; (P) Promoted; (R) Relegated

=== Hokushinetsu ===
==== Division 1 ====
Pos	Team	Pld	W	D	L	GF	GA	GD	Pts	Qualification or relegation
1	Fukui United (C, Q)	14	10	3	1	34	9	+25	33	Qualification for the 2023 Regional Champions League
2	Japan Soccer College FC	14	9	2	3	32	21	+11	29	
3	Niigata University HW FC	14	7	4	3	34	19	+15	25	
4	Toyama Shinjo	14	7	4	3	28	17	+11	25	
5	Artista Asama	14	6	3	5	23	22	+1	21	
6	'05 Kamo FC	14	3	2	9	18	30	−12	11	
7	Antelope Shiojiri (R)	14	2	1	11	17	43	−26	7	Relegated to Hokushinetsu 2nd Division
8	FC Hokuriku (R)	14	1	3	10	12	37	−25	6	Relegated to Hokushinetsu 2nd Division

Updated to match(es) played on 22 September 2023. Source: GoalNote
Rules for classification: 1) Points; 2) Goal difference; 3) Goals scored
(C) Champions; (Q) Qualified for the phase indicated; (R) Relegated

==== Division 2 ====
Pos	Team	Pld	W	D	L	GF	GA	GD	Pts	Qualification or relegation
1	Sakai Phoenix (C, P)	14	10	3	1	44	16	+28	33	Promoted to Hokushinetsu Division 1
2	SR Komatsu (P)	14	8	2	4	40	27	+13	26	Promoted to Hokushinetsu Division 1
3	FC Matsucelona	14	8	1	5	27	18	+9	25	
4	CUPS Seiro	14	6	4	4	23	17	+6	22	
5	Libertas Chikuma	14	4	5	5	25	29	−4	17	
6	N-Style Toyama	14	4	4	6	23	32	−9	16	
7	AS Jamineiro (R)	14	3	4	7	18	40	−22	13	Relegated to Niigata Prefectural League
8	Azalee Iida (R)	14	1	1	12	13	34	−21	4	Relegated to Nagano Prefectural League

Updated to match(es) played on 24 September 2023. Source: GoalNote
Rules for classification: 1) Points; 2) Goal difference; 3) Goals scored
(C) Champions; (P) Promoted; (R) Relegated

=== Tōkai ===
==== Division 1 ====
Pos	Team	Pld	W	D	L	GF	GA	GD	Pts	Qualification or relegation
1	Wyvern FC (C, Q)	14	10	4	0	34	8	+26	34	Qualified for the 2023 Regional Champions League
2	FC Kariya	14	10	3	1	27	9	+18	33	Qualified for the 2023 Regional Champions League
3	FC Ise-Shima	14	6	3	5	19	17	+2	21	
4	Chukyo University FC First	14	5	2	7	20	24	−4	17	
5	Fujieda City Hall	14	4	4	6	21	27	−6	16	
6	Yazaki Valente	14	4	3	7	17	22	−5	15	
7	Tokai Gakuen University FC (R)	14	2	4	8	14	28	−14	10	Relegated to Tokai 2nd Division
8	FC Gifu SECOND (R)	14	2	3	9	12	29	−17	9	Relegated to Tokai 2nd Division

Updated to match(es) played on 8 October 2023. Source: Tokai SL
Rules for classification: 1) Points; 2) Goal difference; 3) Goals scored
(C) Champions; (Q) Qualified for the phase indicated; (R) Relegated

==== Division 2 ====
Pos	Team	Pld	W	D	L	GF	GA	GD	Pts	Qualification or relegation
1	Gakunan F. Mosuperio (C, P)	16	14	2	0	46	9	+37	44	Promoted to Tokai Division 1
2	Sports & Society Izu (P)	16	11	1	4	34	15	+19	34	Promoted to Tokai Division 1
3	Tokoha University Hamamatsu FC	16	8	3	5	34	20	+14	27	
4	Chukyo University FC Second	15	7	3	5	26	22	+4	24	
5	Nagara Club	16	5	3	8	20	29	−9	18	
6	AS Kariya	16	4	4	8	20	37	−17	16	
7	Nagoya SC (R)	16	4	3	9	19	31	−12	15	Relegated to Aichi Prefectural League
8	Toyota SC (R)	16	2	5	9	18	40	−22	11	Relegated to Aichi Prefectural League
9	Bombonera Gifu (R)	15	2	4	9	20	33	−13	10	Relegated to Gifu Prefectural League

Updated to match(es) played on 5 November 2023. Source: Tokai SL
Rules for classification: 1) Points; 2) Goal difference; 3) Goals scored
(C) Champions; (P) Promoted; (R) Relegated

=== Kansai ===
==== Division 1 ====
Pos	Team	Pld	W	D	L	GF	GA	GD	Pts	Qualification or relegation
1	Arterivo Wakayama (C, Q)	14	9	4	1	22	10	+12	31	Qualification for the 2023 Regional Champions League
2	Lagend Shiga	14	7	4	3	20	13	+7	25	
3	Cento Cuore Harima	14	4	7	3	16	15	+1	19	
4	Moriyama Samurai 2000	14	5	3	6	12	17	−5	18	
5	Asuka FC	14	5	1	8	16	19	−3	16	
6	Basara Hyogo	14	4	4	6	16	20	−4	16	
7	Kandai FC 2008 (R)	14	4	3	7	20	22	−2	15	Relegated to Kansai 2nd Division
8	Ococias Kyoto (R)	14	2	6	6	12	18	−6	12	Relegated to Kansai 2nd Division

Updated to match(es) played on 23 September 2023. Source: GoalNote
Rules for classification: 1) Points; 2) Goal difference; 3) Goals scored
(C) Champions; (Q) Qualified for the phase indicated; (R) Relegated

==== Division 2 ====
This is the 19th edition of the Kansai Football League Division 2

Pos	Team	Pld	W	D	L	GF	GA	GD	Pts	Qualification or relegation
1	FC AWJ (C, P)	14	9	2	3	26	18	+8	29	Promoted to Division 1
2	Hannan University Club (P)	14	8	3	3	35	15	+20	27	Promoted to Division 1
3	Laranja Kyoto	14	7	3	4	34	21	+13	24	
4	Kobe FC 1970	14	7	2	5	28	26	+2	23	
5	Kyoto Shiko SC	14	6	3	5	24	21	+3	21	
6	St. Andrews FC	14	5	3	6	29	23	+6	18	
7	Hannan University Revolution (R)	14	4	2	8	20	34	−14	14	Participated in the playoff match and was relegated to the Osaka Prefectural League.
8	Takasago Mineiro (R)	14	0	2	12	11	49	−38	2	Relegated to the Hyogo Prefectural League

Updated to match(es) played on 24 September 2023. Source: GoalNote
Rules for classification: 1) Points; 2) Goal difference; 3) Goals scored 4) Head-to-head records between the teams; a. Points; b. goal difference; c. Total Score.
(C) Champions; (P) Promoted; (R) Relegated

==== Relegation/promotion Playoff ====
14 January 2024
13:00

Hannan University Revolution (Kansai Soccer League Division 2 7th place)	0–1	Osaka Korean FC (Kansai Soccer League Division 2 Promotion Championship 2nd place)
	Report

J-Green Sakai S1 Main Field
- Osaka Korean FC was promoted to the second division, while Hannan University Revolution was relegated to the Osaka Prefectural League.

=== Chūgoku ===
Pos	Team	Pld	W	D	L	GF	GA	GD	Pts	Qualification or relegation
1	Fukuyama City (C, Q)	18	18	0	0	69	6	+63	54	Qualification for the 2023 Regional Champions League
2	SRC Hiroshima	18	13	1	4	55	18	+37	40	
3	Baleine Shimonoseki	18	12	1	5	47	26	+21	37	
4	Belugarosso Iwami	18	12	0	6	60	19	+41	36	
5	Mitsubishi Mizushima	18	10	2	6	30	15	+15	32	
6	Yonago Genki	18	6	2	10	18	27	−9	20	
7	International Pacific University FC	18	5	2	11	21	32	−11	17	
8	Hatsukaichi FC	18	4	3	11	21	41	−20	15	
9	NTN Okayama (O)	18	3	3	12	15	55	−40	12	Participated in the play-off match and won to escape relegation
10	Vajra Okayama (R)	18	0	0	18	4	101	−97	0	Relegated to Okayama Prefectural League

Updated to match(es) played on 1 October 2023. Source: Chugoku SL
Rules for classification: 1) Points; 2) Goal difference; 3) Goals scored
(C) Champions; (O) Play-off winners; (Q) Qualified for the phase indicated; (R) Relegated

==== Promotion/relegation playoff ====
12 October 2023
13:00

NTN Okayama (Chugoku Football League 9th place)	2–0 (a.e.t.)	Indigo FC Yamaguchi (Chugoku Regional League Promotion Championship runner-up)

NTN Okayama Hatada Ground

※NTN Okayama won and therefore retained their place in the Chugoku Regional league.

=== Shikoku ===
Pos	Team	Pld	W	D	L	GF	GA	GD	Pts	Qualification or relegation
1	FC Tokushima (C, Q)	14	11	3	0	70	11	+59	36	Qualification for the 2023 Regional Champions League
2	Lvnirosso NC	14	9	3	2	22	11	+11	30	
3	KUFC Nankoku	14	9	1	4	28	15	+13	28	
4	Tadotsu FC	14	9	1	4	28	19	+9	28	
5	Llamas Kochi	14	6	1	7	22	22	0	19	
6	R.Velho Takamatsu	14	4	1	9	18	36	−18	13	
7	Nakamura Club (O)	14	1	1	12	8	42	−34	4	Participated in the play-off match and won to remain.
8	FC RSG (R)	14	1	1	12	12	52	−40	4	Relegated to Kochi Prefectural League.

Updated to match(es) played on 1 October 2023. Source: GoalNote
Rules for classification: 1) Points; 2) Goal difference; 3) Goals scored
(C) Champions; (O) Play-off winners; (Q) Qualified for the phase indicated; (R) Relegated

==== Promotion/relegation playoff ====
21 January 2024
13:00

Nakamura Club （Shikoku Football League 7th place)	2–0	Yellow Monkeys (Shikoku Challenge League runner-up)

28 January 2024
13:00

Yellow Monkeys	3-2	Nakamura Club

Tokushima Sports Village Pitch C

=== Kyushu ===
Pos	Team	Pld	W	D	L	GF	GA	GD	Pts	Qualification or relegation
1	Veroskronos Tsuno (C, Q)	18	15	2	1	74	6	+68	47	Qualification for the 2023 Regional Champions League
2	Nobeoka Agata	18	13	4	1	57	10	+47	43	
3	J-Lease FC	18	13	3	2	67	13	+54	42	
4	KMG Holdings	18	8	1	9	32	36	−4	25	
5	NIFS Kanoya FC	18	8	1	9	29	37	−8	25	
6	Kawasoe Club	18	6	3	9	14	35	−21	21	
7	Brew Kashima	18	5	5	8	17	22	−5	20	
8	Nippon Steel Oita SC	18	5	4	9	20	33	−13	19	
9	Kajiki FC (R)	18	3	2	13	15	55	−40	11	Participated in the play-off match and was relegated to the Kagoshima Prefectural League
10	Kyushu Sogo Sports College FC (R)	18	1	1	16	8	86	−78	4	Relegated to the Oita Prefectural League

Updated to match(es) played on 22 September 2023. Source: Football System
Rules for classification: 1) Points; 2) Goal difference; 3) Goals scored
(C) Champions; (Q) Qualified for the phase indicated; (R) Relegated

==== Promotion/relegation playoff ====
21 January 2024
13:00

Kajiki FC （Kyushu Football League 9th place）	0–2	Itazuke FC (Kyushu Football League Promotion Championship runner-up)

Kagoshima Prefectural Soccer/Rugby Stadium A Field
