= Japanese Regional Leagues =

Japanese football leagues

- Founded: 1966; 60 years ago (Kansai and Tokai); 1967; 59 years ago (Kanto); 1973; 53 years ago (Chugoku and Kyushu); 1975; 51 years ago (Hokushin'etsu); 1977; 49 years ago (Shikoku and Tohoku); 1978; 48 years ago (Hokkaido)
- Country: Japan
- Confederation: AFC (Asia)
- Divisions: 5 (first level); 6 (second level)
- Number of clubs: 130
- Level on pyramid: 5–6
- Promotion to: Japan Soccer League (1966–1991); Japan Football League (1992–1998); Japan Football League (1999–present)
- Relegation to: Japanese Prefectural Leagues
- Domestic cup(s): Emperor's Cup; Shakaijin Cup
- Current: 2026–27 Japanese Regional Leagues

Japanese Regional Leagues (Japanese: 地域リーグ, Hepburn: Chiiki Rīgu) are a group of parallel association football leagues in Japan that are organised on the regional basis. They form the fifth and sixth tier of the Japanese association football league system below the nationwide Japan Football League.

== Overview ==
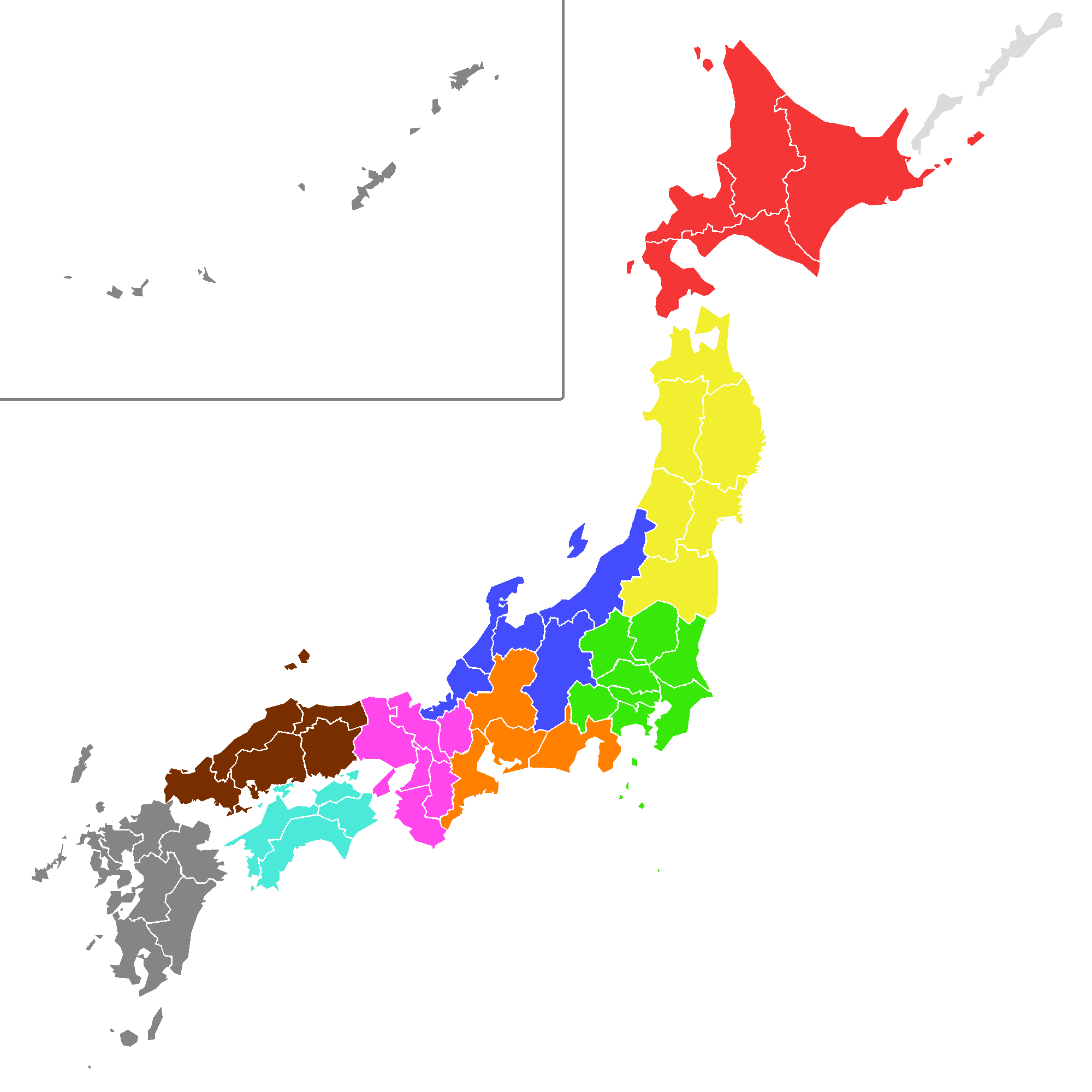
Football regions in Japan: Hokkaido Tōhoku Kantō Hokushinetsu Tōkai Kansai Chūgoku Shikoku Kyushu Hokkaido subdivision boundaries are by Block League.

Japan is divided regionally in a variety of ways, some of them administrative and some more historical. For football purposes, the country is divided into nine regions. All regional league champions earn the right to participate in the Regional Football League Competition (since 2016 renamed Japanese Regional Football Champions League) at the end of the year. Runners-up may also qualify according to criteria set by the Japan Football Association.

Regional league clubs also compete in the All Japan Senior Football Championship, a cup competition. The winner of this cup also earns a berth in the Regional League promotion series, and the runner-up may also qualify depending on space and JFA criteria.

Regional league clubs must win the qualifying cup in their home prefecture in order to compete in the Emperor's Cup.

Since the divisions rarely go over 10 members, the season is shorter and long summer breaks may be taken.

Among the existing Japanese clubs there are ten that have never played in the regional leagues. They are:

- Japan Soccer League co-founders Urawa Red Diamonds, JEF United Chiba, Kashiwa Reysol, Cerezo Osaka, Sanfrecce Hiroshima (listed under current names, all formed the old league in 1965);
- Independent club Shimizu S-Pulse, established as a professional club upon J. League creation in 1992;
- Sagan Tosu, took over the folded Tosu Futures in the former JFL in 1997;
- Yokohama FC, directly admitted into the Japan Football League in 1999 upon their formation;
- Kataller Toyama, formed in 2008 as a result of the fusion of JFL clubs ALO's Hokuriku and YKK AP.
- Kagoshima United FC, formed in 2014 as a result of the fusion of Kyushu League clubs Volca Kagoshima and FC Kagoshima, top two in the 2013 Regional Promotion Series, and which joined the JFL as a merged club

Additionally, the forerunners to Tosu Futures, Kashima Antlers, Avispa Fukuoka and Vissel Kobe were originally based in different regions (and won or were promoted from those regions) from where they, or their successors, are based today:

- Kashima Antlers were originally based in Kansai but moved to Kantō in 1975 after reaching the JSL;
- Tosu Futures were originally based in Tōkai but moved to Kyushu in 1994 after reaching the former JFL;
- Avispa Fukuoka was originally based in Tōkai but moved to Kyushu in 1994 after reaching the former JFL;
- Vissel Kobe was originally based in Chūgoku but moved to Kansai in 1995 after reaching the former JFL.

== Regional Leagues clubs, 2025 ==
=== Hokkaido Soccer League ===
League	Teams	Hometown
Hokkaido Soccer League 北海道サッカーリーグ	ASC Hokkaido (ja)	Tomakomai, Hokkaido
Hokkaido Soccer League 北海道サッカーリーグ	BTOP Hokkaido	Kuriyama, Hokkaido
Hokkaido Soccer League 北海道サッカーリーグ	Sapporo FC (ja)	Sapporo, Hokkaido
Hokkaido Soccer League 北海道サッカーリーグ	Hokkaido Tokachi Sky Earth	Obihiro, Hokkaido
Hokkaido Soccer League 北海道サッカーリーグ	Hokushukai Iwamizawa (ja)	Iwamizawa, Hokkaido
Hokkaido Soccer League 北海道サッカーリーグ	Norbritz Hokkaido	Ebetsu, Hokkaido
Hokkaido Soccer League 北海道サッカーリーグ	Sabas FC	Sapporo, Hokkaido
Hokkaido Soccer League 北海道サッカーリーグ	Sapporo University Goal Plunderers (ja)	Sapporo, Hokkaido

=== Tohoku Member-of-Society Soccer League ===
League	Division	Teams	Hometown
Tohoku Member-of-Society Soccer League 東北社会人サッカーリーグ	Division 1	Blancdieu Hirosaki	Hirosaki, Aomori
Tohoku Member-of-Society Soccer League 東北社会人サッカーリーグ	Division 1	Cobaltore Onagawa	Onagawa, Miyagi
Tohoku Member-of-Society Soccer League 東北社会人サッカーリーグ	Division 1	Fuji Club 2003 (ja)	Hanamaki, Iwate
Tohoku Member-of-Society Soccer League 東北社会人サッカーリーグ	Division 1	Ganju Iwate	Morioka, Iwate
Tohoku Member-of-Society Soccer League 東北社会人サッカーリーグ	Division 1	Hitome Senbonzakura SUFT (ja)	Sendai, Miyagi
Tohoku Member-of-Society Soccer League 東北社会人サッカーリーグ	Division 1	FC LA U. de Sendai (ja)	Sendai, Miyagi
Tohoku Member-of-Society Soccer League 東北社会人サッカーリーグ	Division 1	Michinoku Sendai	Iwanuma, Miyagi
Tohoku Member-of-Society Soccer League 東北社会人サッカーリーグ	Division 1	Sendai Sasuke	Sendai, Miyagi
Tohoku Member-of-Society Soccer League 東北社会人サッカーリーグ	Division 1	Shichigahama SC	Shichigahama, Miyagi
Tohoku Member-of-Society Soccer League 東北社会人サッカーリーグ	Division 1	Shichinohe SC	Shichinohe, Aomori
Tohoku Member-of-Society Soccer League 東北社会人サッカーリーグ	Division 2 North	Bogolle D. Tsugaru	Tsugaru, Aomori
Tohoku Member-of-Society Soccer League 東北社会人サッカーリーグ	Division 2 North	Morioka Zebra	Morioka, Iwate
Tohoku Member-of-Society Soccer League 東北社会人サッカーリーグ	Division 2 North	Saruta Kogyo	Akita, Akita
Tohoku Member-of-Society Soccer League 東北社会人サッカーリーグ	Division 2 North	TDK Shinwakai	Nikaho, Akita
Tohoku Member-of-Society Soccer League 東北社会人サッカーリーグ	Division 2 North	Nippon Steel Corp. Kamaishi (ja)	Kamaishi, Iwate
Tohoku Member-of-Society Soccer League 東北社会人サッカーリーグ	Division 2 North	Omiya SC	Morioka, Iwate
Tohoku Member-of-Society Soccer League 東北社会人サッカーリーグ	Division 2 North	Oshu United	Ōshū, Iwate
Tohoku Member-of-Society Soccer League 東北社会人サッカーリーグ	Division 2 North	Nu Perle Hiraizumi Maesawa	Hiraizumi, Iwate
Tohoku Member-of-Society Soccer League 東北社会人サッカーリーグ	Division 2 South	Chaneaule Koriyama	Kōriyama, Fukushima
Tohoku Member-of-Society Soccer League 東北社会人サッカーリーグ	Division 2 South	Iwaki Furukawa	Iwaki, Fukushima
Tohoku Member-of-Society Soccer League 東北社会人サッカーリーグ	Division 2 South	FC La U. de Sendai Second (ja)	Sendai, Miyagi
Tohoku Member-of-Society Soccer League 東北社会人サッカーリーグ	Division 2 South	Merry FC (ja)	Fukushima, Fukushima
Tohoku Member-of-Society Soccer League 東北社会人サッカーリーグ	Division 2 South	Parafrente Yonezawa (ja)	Yamagata
Tohoku Member-of-Society Soccer League 東北社会人サッカーリーグ	Division 2 South	Oyama SC	Tsuruoka, Yamagata
Tohoku Member-of-Society Soccer League 東北社会人サッカーリーグ	Division 2 South	Primeiro Fukushima	Kōriyama, Fukushima
Tohoku Member-of-Society Soccer League 東北社会人サッカーリーグ	Division 2 South	RICOH Industry Tohoku	Shibata, Miyagi

=== Kantō Soccer League ===
League	Division	Teams	Hometown
Kanto Soccer League 関東サッカーリーグ	Division 1	Aries Toshima	Toshima, Tokyo
Kanto Soccer League 関東サッカーリーグ	Division 1	Joyful Honda Tsukuba	Tsukuba, Ibaraki
Kanto Soccer League 関東サッカーリーグ	Division 1	Nankatsu SC	Katsushika, Tokyo
Kanto Soccer League 関東サッカーリーグ	Division 1	Nihon University N. (ja)	Inagi, Tokyo
Kanto Soccer League 関東サッカーリーグ	Division 1	RKD Ryugasaki	Ryūgasaki, Ibaraki
Kanto Soccer League 関東サッカーリーグ	Division 1	Toho Titanium SC	Chigasaki, Kanagawa
Kanto Soccer League 関東サッカーリーグ	Division 1	Toin University of Yokohama FC (ja)	Yokohama, Kanagawa
Kanto Soccer League 関東サッカーリーグ	Division 1	Tokyo 23	Special wards of Tokyo
Kanto Soccer League 関東サッカーリーグ	Division 1	Tokyo United	Bunkyō, Tokyo
Kanto Soccer League 関東サッカーリーグ	Division 1	Vonds Ichihara	Ichihara, Chiba
Kanto Soccer League 関東サッカーリーグ	Division 2	Atsugi Hayabusa FC	Atsugi, Kanagawa
Kanto Soccer League 関東サッカーリーグ	Division 2	Coedo Kawagoe	Kawagoe, Saitama
Kanto Soccer League 関東サッカーリーグ	Division 2	Edo All United	Chūō, Kōtō, Tokyo
Kanto Soccer League 関東サッカーリーグ	Division 2	Esperanza SC	Yokohama, Kanagawa
Kanto Soccer League 関東サッカーリーグ	Division 2	Hitachi Building System SC	Chiyoda, Tokyo
Kanto Soccer League 関東サッカーリーグ	Division 2	Shibuya City FC	Shibuya, Tokyo
Kanto Soccer League 関東サッカーリーグ	Division 2	Tokyo International University FC (ja)	Sakado, Saitama
Kanto Soccer League 関東サッカーリーグ	Division 2	Tonan Maebashi	Maebashi, Gunma
Kanto Soccer League 関東サッカーリーグ	Division 2	Vertfee Yaita	Yaita, Tochigi
Kanto Soccer League 関東サッカーリーグ	Division 2	Yokohama Takeru	Yokohama, Kanagawa

=== Hokushin'etsu Football League ===
League	Division	Teams	Hometown
Hokushin'etsu Football League 北信越フットボールリーグ	Division 1	Artista Asama	Tōmi, Nagano
Hokushin'etsu Football League 北信越フットボールリーグ	Division 1	Fukui United	Fukui, Fukui
Hokushin'etsu Football League 北信越フットボールリーグ	Division 1	FC Hokuriku (ja)	Kanazawa, Ishikawa
Hokushin'etsu Football League 北信越フットボールリーグ	Division 1	Japan Soccer College	Seiro, Niigata
Hokushin'etsu Football League 北信越フットボールリーグ	Division 1	Niigata University of Health and Welfare FC (ja)	Niigata, Niigata
Hokushin'etsu Football League 北信越フットボールリーグ	Division 1	Niigata University of Management FC (ja)	Kamo, Niigata
Hokushin'etsu Football League 北信越フットボールリーグ	Division 1	SR Komatsu	Komatsu, Ishikawa
Hokushin'etsu Football League 北信越フットボールリーグ	Division 1	Toyama Shinjo Club	Toyama, Toyama
Hokushin'etsu Football League 北信越フットボールリーグ	Division 2	FC Abies	Chino, Nagano
Hokushin'etsu Football League 北信越フットボールリーグ	Division 2	Antelope Shiojiri	Shiojiri, Nagano
Hokushin'etsu Football League 北信越フットボールリーグ	Division 2	CUPS Seiro	Seiro, Niigata
Hokushin'etsu Football League 北信越フットボールリーグ	Division 2	Kanazawa Gakuin University FC	Kanazawa, Ishikawa
Hokushin'etsu Football League 北信越フットボールリーグ	Division 2	FC Matsucelona (ja)	Matsumoto, Nagano
Hokushin'etsu Football League 北信越フットボールリーグ	Division 2	N-Style	Toyama, Toyama
Hokushin'etsu Football League 北信越フットボールリーグ	Division 2	NUHW FC (ja)	Niigata, Niigata
Hokushin'etsu Football League 北信越フットボールリーグ	Division 2	Sakai Phoenix	Sakai, Fukui

=== Tōkai Soccer League ===
League	Division	Teams	Hometown
Tōkai Soccer League 東海サッカーリーグ	Division 1	Chukyo University FC (ja)	Nagoya, Aichi
Tōkai Soccer League 東海サッカーリーグ	Division 1	Fujieda City Hall SC	Fujieda, Shizuoka
Tōkai Soccer League 東海サッカーリーグ	Division 1	Gakunan F. Mosuperio	Fuji, Shizuoka and Fujinomiya, Shizuoka
Tōkai Soccer League 東海サッカーリーグ	Division 1	FC Ise-Shima	Shima, Mie
Tōkai Soccer League 東海サッカーリーグ	Division 1	AS Kariya	Kariya, Aichi
Tōkai Soccer League 東海サッカーリーグ	Division 1	FC Kariya	Kariya, Aichi
Tōkai Soccer League 東海サッカーリーグ	Division 1	Vencedor Mie	Tsu, Mie
Tōkai Soccer League 東海サッカーリーグ	Division 1	Wyvern FC	Kariya, Aichi
Tōkai Soccer League 東海サッカーリーグ	Division 2	Chukyo Univ.FC (ja)	Toyota, Aichi
Tōkai Soccer League 東海サッカーリーグ	Division 2	FC Gifu SECOND (ja)	Gifu, Gifu
Tōkai Soccer League 東海サッカーリーグ	Division 2	Nagoya SC	Nagoya, Aichi
Tōkai Soccer League 東海サッカーリーグ	Division 2	Rajil FC Higashimikawa	Toyokawa, Toyohashi, Aichi
Tōkai Soccer League 東海サッカーリーグ	Division 2	Sports & Society Izu	Izu, Shizuoka
Tōkai Soccer League 東海サッカーリーグ	Division 2	Tokai FC	Yatomi, Aichi
Tōkai Soccer League 東海サッカーリーグ	Division 2	Tokai Gakuen University FC (ja)	Miyoshi, Aichi
Tōkai Soccer League 東海サッカーリーグ	Division 2	Yazaki Valente	Shimada, Shizuoka

=== Kansai Soccer League ===
League	Division	Teams	Hometown
Kansai Soccer League 関西サッカーリーグ	Division 1	Arterivo Wakayama	Wakayama, Wakayama
Kansai Soccer League 関西サッカーリーグ	Division 1	FC AWJ	Awaji Island
Kansai Soccer League 関西サッカーリーグ	Division 1	FC Basara Hyogo	Akashi, Hyōgo
Kansai Soccer League 関西サッカーリーグ	Division 1	Cento Cuore Harima	Kakogawa, Hyogo
Kansai Soccer League 関西サッカーリーグ	Division 1	Kobe FC 1970	Kobe, Hyogo
Kansai Soccer League 関西サッカーリーグ	Division 1	Laranja Kyoto	Kyoto, Kyoto
Kansai Soccer League 関西サッカーリーグ	Division 1	Moriyama Samurai 2000	Moriyama, Shiga
Kansai Soccer League 関西サッカーリーグ	Division 1	Velago Ikoma	Ikoma, Nara
Kansai Soccer League 関西サッカーリーグ	Division 2	Hannan University Club (ja)	Matsubara, Osaka
Kansai Soccer League 関西サッカーリーグ	Division 2	Kandai FC 2008 (ja)	Suita, Osaka
Kansai Soccer League 関西サッカーリーグ	Division 2	Kyoto Shiko Club	Kyoto, Kyoto
Kansai Soccer League 関西サッカーリーグ	Division 2	AC Middle Range	Osaka, Osaka
Kansai Soccer League 関西サッカーリーグ	Division 2	Ococias Kyoto	Kyoto, Kyoto
Kansai Soccer League 関西サッカーリーグ	Division 2	Osaka Korean FC	Osaka, Osaka
Kansai Soccer League 関西サッカーリーグ	Division 2	Route 11	Kishiwada, Osaka
Kansai Soccer League 関西サッカーリーグ	Division 2	St.Andrew's FC (ja)	Izumi, Osaka

=== Chūgoku Soccer League ===
League	Teams	Hometown
Chūgoku Soccer League 中国サッカーリーグ	Baleine Shimonoseki	Shimonoseki, Yamaguchi
Chūgoku Soccer League 中国サッカーリーグ	Banmel Tottori	Tottori, Tottori
Chūgoku Soccer League 中国サッカーリーグ	Belugarosso Iwami	Iwami, Shimane
Chūgoku Soccer League 中国サッカーリーグ	ENEOS Mizushima (ja)	Kurashiki, Okayama
Chūgoku Soccer League 中国サッカーリーグ	Fukuyama City FC	Fukuyama, Hiroshima
Chūgoku Soccer League 中国サッカーリーグ	Hatsukaichi FC	Hatsukaichi, Hiroshima
Chūgoku Soccer League 中国サッカーリーグ	International Pacific University FC (ja)	Okayama, Okayama
Chūgoku Soccer League 中国サッカーリーグ	Mitsubishi Motors Mizushima FC	Kurashiki, Okayama
Chūgoku Soccer League 中国サッカーリーグ	SRC Hiroshima	Hiroshima, Hiroshima
Chūgoku Soccer League 中国サッカーリーグ	Yonago Genki SC	Yonago, Tottori

=== Shikoku Soccer League ===
League	Teams	Hometown
Shikoku Soccer League 四国サッカーリーグ	KUFC Nankoku (ja)	Nankoku, Kōchi
Shikoku Soccer League 四国サッカーリーグ	Llamas Kochi	Kōchi, Kōchi
Shikoku Soccer League 四国サッカーリーグ	Lvnirosso NC	Niihama, Ehime
Shikoku Soccer League 四国サッカーリーグ	Alverio Takamatsu	Takamatsu, Kagawa
Shikoku Soccer League 四国サッカーリーグ	Sonio Takamatsu	Takamatsu, Kagawa
Shikoku Soccer League 四国サッカーリーグ	Tadotsu FC	Tadotsu, Kagawa
Shikoku Soccer League 四国サッカーリーグ	FC Tokushima	Tokushima, Tokushima
Shikoku Soccer League 四国サッカーリーグ	YFC Shikoku Central	Shikokuchūō, Ehime

=== Kyushu Soccer League ===
League	Teams	Hometown
Kyushu Soccer League 九州サッカーリーグ
Kyushu Soccer League 九州サッカーリーグ	Brew Kashima	Kashima, Saga
Kyushu Soccer League 九州サッカーリーグ	FC Hakata	Fukuoka, Fukuoka
Kyushu Soccer League 九州サッカーリーグ	Kawasoe Club	Kawasoe, Saga
Kyushu Soccer League 九州サッカーリーグ	KMG Holdings FC	Fukuoka, Fukuoka
Kyushu Soccer League 九州サッカーリーグ	J-Lease FC	Oita, Oita
Kyushu Soccer League 九州サッカーリーグ	MHI Nagasaki SC	Nagasaki, Nagasaki
Kyushu Soccer League 九州サッカーリーグ	NIFS Kanoya FC (ja)	Kanoya, Kagoshima
Kyushu Soccer League 九州サッカーリーグ	Nippon Steel Oita SC (ja)	Ōita, Ōita
Kyushu Soccer League 九州サッカーリーグ	Nobeoka Agata	Nobeoka, Miyazaki
Kyushu Soccer League 九州サッカーリーグ	Veroskronos Tsuno	Tsuno, Miyazaki

== See also ==
- Sport in Japan
  - Football in Japan
    - Women's football in Japan
- Japan Football Association (JFA)
