= Hiroki Tanaka =

Japanese footballer

Personal information
- Date of birth: May 25, 1991 (age 35)
- Place of birth: Yokosuka, Kanagawa, Japan
- Height: 1.78 m (5 ft 10 in)
- Position: Defender

Team information
- Current team: FC Maruyasu Okazaki
- Number: 15

Youth career
- 2010–2013: Yamanashi Gakuin University

Senior career*
Years	Team	Apps	(Gls)
2014–2016	Kataller Toyama	26	(0)
2016	→ FC Maruyasu Okazaki (loan)	29	(1)
2017–	FC Maruyasu Okazaki		
- * Club domestic league appearances and goals as of December 31, 2016

Hiroki Tanaka (田中 寛己, Tanaka Hiroki; born May 25, 1991) is a Japanese football player.

== Career ==
He received his first appearance professional match on April 20, 2014, starting against JEF United Chiba.

== Career statistics ==
Updated to 20 February 2017.

Appearances and goals by club, season and competition
Club	Season	League			Emperor's Cup		Total	
Club	Season	Division	Apps	Goals	Apps	Goals	Apps	Goals
Kataller Toyama	2014	J2 League	13	0	0	0	13	0
Kataller Toyama	2015	J3 League	13	0	0	0	13	0
FC Maruyasu Okazaki	2016	JFL	29	1	0	0	29	1
Career total			55	1	0	0	55	1
