= Sasuga Kiyokawa =

Japanese footballer

Personal information
- Date of birth: 20 July 1996 (age 30)
- Place of birth: Matsuyama, Ehime, Japan
- Height: 1.76 m (5 ft 9 in)
- Position: Midfielder

Team information
- Current team: Ehime
- Number: 28

Youth career
- 2009–2014: Ehime FC

College career
Years	Team	Apps	(Gls)
2015–2018	Biwako Seikei Sport College		

Senior career*
Years	Team	Apps	(Gls)
2019–	Ehime FC	13	(0)
- * Club domestic league appearances and goals

Sasuga Kiyokawa (清川 流石, Kiyokawa Sasuga; born 20 July 1996) is a Japanese footballer currently playing as a midfielder for Ehime.

== Club career ==
Kiyokawa made his professional debut on 3 July 2019 in an Emperor's Cup game against Tokushima Vortis.

== Career statistics ==
=== Club ===
As of Suzuka Point Getters 2020.

Club	Season	League			National Cup		League Cup		Other		Total	
Club	Season	Division	Apps	Goals	Apps	Goals	Apps	Goals	Apps	Goals	Apps	Goals
Ehime	2019	J2 League	0	0	1 (Note: Appearance(s) in Emperor's Cup)	0	0	0	0	0	1	0
Ehime	2020	J2 League	13	0	0	0	0	0	0	0	13	0
Career total			13	0	1	0	0	0	0	0	14	0
