= Tomohiro Tsuda =

Japanese footballer (born 1986)

Tomohiro Tsuda 津田 知宏
Personal information
- Full name: Tomohiro Tsuda
- Date of birth: May 6, 1986 (age 40)
- Place of birth: Kakamigahara, Gifu, Japan
- Height: 1.79 m (5 ft 10 in)
- Position: Forward

Team information
- Current team: FC Maruyasu Okazaki
- Number: 27

Youth career
- 2002–2004: Nagoya Grampus Eight

Senior career*
Years	Team	Apps	(Gls)
2005–2009	Nagoya Grampus	46	(6)
2010–2015	Tokushima Vortis	185	(48)
2016–2017	Yokohama FC	51	(4)
2018–2019	Nagano Parceiro	33	(10)
2020–	FC Maruyasu Okazaki		
Medal record
Nagoya Grampus
Runner-up	Emperor's Cup	2009
- * Club domestic league appearances and goals as of 1 January 2020

Tomohiro Tsuda (津田 知宏, Tsuda Tomohiro; born May 6, 1986) is a Japanese coach and former football player.

== Career ==
Tsuda came through the youth academy of Nagoya Grampus Eight. In 2005, he was promoted to the first team together with Ryota Takahashi. At Nagoya, he was mainly used as a substitute and was also occasionally deployed as a Midfielder.

In 2010, he was loaned to J2 club Tokushima Vortis. Tsuda played as a regular and scored 16 goals that season, finishing 2nd in the J2 scoring rankings. In 2011, his loan was extended and he remained with the team. On July 16, 2011, his goal in J2 Matchday 21 was selected as the J2 Goal of the Month for July. In 2012, he joined Tokushima on a permanent transfer. In 2013, he scored 14 goals in J2 and contributed to the team’s promotion to J1.

In 2014, the team played in J1 for the first time but struggled at the bottom of the table. Despite being expected to perform as the team’s ace striker, he finished the season with zero goals and lost his regular spot to Hiroyuki Takasaki.

From 2016, he played for Yokohama FC.

In 2018, Tsuda transferred permanently to AC Nagano Parceiro. He showed good form at one point, scoring a team-high 6 goals, but suffered an injury during training in late September. He was diagnosed with a left soleus muscle injury (left calf muscle strain) with an expected recovery time of about 4 weeks. In the 2019 season, which he hoped would mark his comeback, he was injured again in early February during pre-season training. He was diagnosed with a left hamstring injury and expected to be out for 7–8 weeks. Despite this, he managed to play 19 matches after recovering. On December 4, 2019, AC Nagano Parceiro announced that his contract had expired.

In 2020, he moved to FC Maruyasu Okazaki. However, he left the club after just one year.

In 2021, he transferred to Wyvern FC, a team in the 2nd division of the Tōkai Adult Soccer League. He left the club in 2025 and retired from professional playing.

From 2026, Tsuda has taken up the position of head coach of the Nagoya University soccer team.

== Club statistics ==
Updated to 1 January 2020.

Club performance			League		Cup		League Cup		Continental		Total	
Season	Club	League	Apps	Goals	Apps	Goals	Apps	Goals	Apps	Goals	Apps	Goals
Japan			League		Emperor's Cup		League Cup		AFC		Total	
2005	Nagoya Grampus	J1 League	1	0	1	0	2	0	-		4	0
2006	Nagoya Grampus	J1 League	14	3	2	0	3	0	-		19	3
2007	Nagoya Grampus	J1 League	17	2	0	0	3	0	-		20	2
2008	Nagoya Grampus	J1 League	3	0	0	0	5	2	-		8	2
2009	Nagoya Grampus	J1 League	11	1	1	0	2	0	2	0	16	1
2010	Tokushima Vortis	J2 League	31	16	2	1	-		-		33	17
2011	Tokushima Vortis	J2 League	31	7	0	0	-		-		31	7
2012	Tokushima Vortis	J2 League	35	9	2	2	-		-		37	11
2013	Tokushima Vortis	J2 League	40	14	0	0	-		-		40	14
2014	Tokushima Vortis	J1 League	19	0	1	0	3	0	-		23	0
2015	Tokushima Vortis	J2 League	29	2	3	2	-		-		32	4
2016	Yokohama FC	J2 League	33	4	2	0	-		-		35	4
2017	Yokohama FC	J2 League	18	0	0	0	-		-		18	0
2018	Nagano Parceiro	J3 League	14	6	0	0	-		-		14	6
2019	Nagano Parceiro	J3 League	19	4	1	0	-		-		20	4
Career total			315	68	15	5	18	2	2	0	350	75
