= Daiki Yamamoto =

Japanese footballer

Personal information
- Date of birth: 25 March 1992 (age 34)
- Place of birth: Fujiidera, Osaka, Japan
- Height: 1.65 m (5 ft 5 in)
- Position: Midfielder

Team information
- Current team: Tochigi SC
- Number: 20

Youth career
- 2007–2009: Yonago Kita High School
- 2010–2013: Osaka University of Health and Sport Sciences

Senior career*
Years	Team	Apps	(Gls)
2014–2015	Gainare Tottori	45	(4)
2016–	Tochigi SC		
- * Club domestic league appearances and goals as of 23 February 2016

Daiki Yamamoto (山本大稀, Yamamoto Daiki; born 25 March 1992 in Fujiidera, Osaka) is a Japanese footballer who plays for Tochigi SC.

== Club statistics ==
Updated to 23 February 2016.

Club performance			League		Cup		Total	
Season	Club	League	Apps	Goals	Apps	Goals	Apps	Goals
Japan			League		Emperor's Cup		Total	
2014	Gainare Tottori	J3 League	15	0	0	0	15	0
2015	Gainare Tottori	J3 League	30	4	2	1	32	5
Career total			45	4	2	1	47	5
