= Tsukuba FC =

Japanese football club

Tsukuba FC つくばFC
- Full name: Joyful Honda Tsukuba FC
- Founded: 1993; 33 years ago
- Ground: Tsukuba Wellness Park; Tsukuba, Ibaraki
- Chairman: Shinnosuke Ishikawa
- Manager: Hideharu Soejima
- League: Kantō Soccer League Div. 1
- 2022: 5th of 10
Home colours	Away colours

Tsukuba FC (つくばFC, Tsukuba Efushi) is a football (soccer) club based in Tsukuba, which is located in Ibaraki Prefecture in Japan. They play in the Kantō Soccer League, which is part of Japanese Regional Leagues.

== History ==
Tied to University of Tsukuba, the club was initially founded in 1993 as a women's football club. Shortly after that, a men's version of the club was launched. In 2000s, even U-12 and U-15 squad were created and Tsukuba FC have the goal of reaching professional football in 2020. In 2014, the club reached Kanto Soccer League, winning immediately 2nd Division and now trying to reach Japan Football League. Their plans revealed the will to build a stadium for 30,000 people in the near future. Tsukuba FC's main sponsor is Joyful Honda, a hardware store unrelated to Honda Motor Company.

== Current squad ==
As of 23 August 2023.

Note: Flags indicate national team as defined under FIFA eligibility rules; some limited exceptions apply. Players may hold more than one non-FIFA nationality.

No.	Pos.	Nation	Player
1	GK	JPN	Ryo Mizuno
2	DF	JPN	Makoto Tokutake
3	DF	JPN	Koichi Komazaki
5	MF	JPN	Takumu Kimoto
6	MF	JPN	Yuki Fukazawa
7	MF	JPN	Kazuma Kuwata
8	MF	JPN	Ryunosuke Suzuki
9	DF	JPN	Shunsuke Yamazaki
10	MF	JPN	Masato Sugaya
11	FW	JPN	Hideaki Miyamoto
13	FW	JPN	Junnosuke Okazaki
14	DF	JPN	Shun Aoki
16	MF	JPN	Taisei Masuda
17	DF	JPN	Seiya Kumagai
18	DF	JPN	Shuhei Takizawa

No.	Pos.	Nation	Player
19	MF	JPN	Shuta Kotaka
21	GK	JPN	Keita Minuma
23	MF	JPN	Yukihiro Kawashima
24	MF	JPN	Kohei Kori
25	DF	JPN	Ryuya Nakazato
26	FW	JPN	Chisato Suda
27	FW	JPN	Yuya Gunji
28	DF	JPN	Eiji Koakutsu
29	MF	JPN	Kazuma Suzuki
30	FW	JPN	Tatsunosuke Onzuka
31	DF	JPN	Keisuke Komuro
33	FW	JPN	Mizaki Kawashima
34	DF	JPN	Ryusei Yagoshi
36	GK	JPN	Daiki Akutsu

== League record ==
Champions	Runners-up	Third place	Promoted	Relegated

Season	League	Tier	Position	P	W	D	L	F	A	GD	Pts
2012	Ibaraki Prefectural; League (Div. 1)	7	4th	14	6	1	7				19
2013	Ibaraki Prefectural; League (Div. 1)	7	2nd	14	11	1	2				34
2014	Kantō Soccer League (Div. 2)	6	1st	18	13	2	3	55	21	34	41
2015	Kantō Soccer; League (Div. 1)	5	3rd	18	11	3	4	45	27	18	36
2016	Kantō Soccer; League (Div. 1)	5	5th	18	8	3	7	37	34	3	27
2017	Kantō Soccer; League (Div. 1)	5	2nd	18	13	2	3	43	17	26	41
2018	Kantō Soccer; League (Div. 1)	5	7th	18	6	4	8	32	37	-5	22
2019	Kantō Soccer; League (Div. 1)	5	7th	18	5	6	7	18	27	-9	21
2020 †	Kantō Soccer; League (Div. 1)	5	10th	18	1	0	8	8	23	-15	3
2021	Kantō Soccer; League (Div. 1)	5	8th	22	7	4	11	30	32	-2	25
2022	Kantō Soccer; League (Div. 1)	5	5th	18	6	4	8	19	28	-9	22
2023 ††	Kantō Soccer; League (Div. 1)	5	5th	18	7	4	7	25	30	-5	24
2024	Kantō Soccer; League (Div. 1)	5	3rd	18	8	5	5	27	26	1	29
2025	Kantō Soccer; League (Div. 1)	5	10th	18	2	3	13	26	38	-12	9
2026	Kantō Soccer League (Div. 2)	6	TBD	18							

Key

- Pos. = Position in league; P = Games played; W = Games won; D = Games drawn; L = Games lost; F = Goals scored; A = Goals conceded; GD = Goals difference; Pts
- † 2020 no relegation due to COVID-19
- †† Tsukuba FC was given a penalty of minus one point for issuing five or more warnings and sending offs in the 7th match week of the previous round.
