= List of football clubs in Japan =

This is a list of association football clubs in Japan from the 2026–27 season.

== Japan Professional Football League (J.League) ==
Three leagues will consist of 20 teams from 2024 onwards.

=== J1 League ===
First division of the Japanese professional football system with 20 clubs:

- Avispa Fukuoka
- Cerezo Osaka
- Fagiano Okayama
- Gamba Osaka
- JEF United Chiba
- Kashima Antlers
- Kashiwa Reysol
- Kawasaki Frontale
- Kyoto Sanga
- Machida Zelvia
- Mito HollyHock
- Nagoya Grampus
- Sanfrecce Hiroshima
- Shimizu S-Pulse
- FC Tokyo
- Tokyo Verdy
- Urawa Red Diamonds
- V-Varen Nagasaki
- Vissel Kobe
- Yokohama F. Marinos

=== J2 League ===
Second division of the Japanese professional football system with 20 clubs:

- Albirex Niigata
- Blaublitz Akita
- Fujieda MYFC
- Hokkaido Consadole Sapporo
- FC Imabari
- Iwaki FC
- Júbilo Iwata
- Kataller Toyama
- Montedio Yamagata
- Oita Trinita
- RB Omiya Ardija
- Sagan Tosu
- Shonan Bellmare
- Tegevajaro Miyazaki
- Tochigi City FC
- Tokushima Vortis
- Vanraure Hachinohe
- Vegalta Sendai
- Ventforet Kofu
- Yokohama FC

=== J3 League ===
Third and last division of the Japanese professional football system with 20 clubs:

- Ehime FC
- Fukushima United
- Gainare Tottori
- FC Gifu
- Giravanz Kitakyushu
- Kagoshima United
- Kamatamare Sanuki
- Kochi United
- Matsumoto Yamaga
- Nagano Parceiro
- Nara Club
- FC Osaka
- Reilac Shiga
- Renofa Yamaguchi
- Roasso Kumamoto
- Ryukyu Okinawa
- SC Sagamihara
- Thespa Gunma
- Tochigi SC
- Zweigen Kanazawa

== Japan Football League (JFL) ==
First division of the Japanese amateur football system and the only nationwide division for amateur clubs.

16 clubs:

- Azul Claro Numazu (L)
- Briobecca Urayasu Ichikawa
- Criacao Shinjuku (L)
- Honda FC (C)
- Iwate Grulla Morioka (L)
- J-Lease FC
- Maruyasu Okazaki (C)
- Minebea Mitsumi FC (C)
- Okinawa SV
- ReinMeer Aomori (L)
- Tiamo Hirakata
- Veertien Mie (L)
- Verspah Oita (L)
- Vonds Ichihara
- Yokogawa Musashino
- Yokohama Sports & Culture Club

== Japanese Regional Leagues ==
It are a group of nine parallel association football leagues in Japan that are organized on the regional basis. They form the fifth and sixth tier of the Japanese association football league system.

=== Hokkaidō League ===
- ASC Hokkaido (Tomakomai, Hokkaido)
- Sabas (Sapporo, Hokkaido, Hokkaido)
- BTOP Hokkaido (Kuriyama, Hokkaido)
- Canale Otaru (Otaru, Hokkaido)
- Hokkaido Tokachi Sky Earth (Obihiro, Hokkaido)
- Japan Steel Muroran (Muroran, Hokkaido)
- Norbritz Hokkaido (Sapporo, Hokkaido)
- Sapporo Univ. Goal Plunderers (Sapporo, Hokkaido) (Un)

=== Tōhoku League ===
==== Division 1 ====
- Blancdieu Hirosaki (Hirosaki, Aomori)
- Cobaltore Onagawa (Onagawa, Miyagi)
- Fuji Club 2003 (Hanamaki, Iwate) (Un)
- Ganju Iwate (Hachimantai, Iwate)
- Hitome Senbonzakura ft. S.U.F.T. (Shibata, Miyagi) (Un)
- Michinoku Sendai (Sendai, Miyagi Prefecture)
- Shichigahama SC (Shichigahama, Miyagi)
- Shichinohe SC (Shichinohe, Aomori)
- Sendai Sasuke (Sendai, Miyagi)
- FC La Universidad de Sendai (Shibata, Miyagi) (Un)

==== Division 2 ====
===== North =====
- Bogolle D. Tsugaru (Tsugaru, Aomori)
- Morioka Zebra (Morioka, Iwate)
- Nu Perle Hiraizumi Maesawa (Hiraizumi, Iwate)
- Nippon Steel Kamaishi (Kamaishi, Iwate) (C)
- Omiya SC (Ōmiya-ku, Saitama)
- Oshu United (Oshu, Iwate)
- Saruta Kōgyō (Akita, Akita) (C)
- TDK Shinwakai (Nikaho, Akita)

===== South =====
- Chaneaule Koriyama (Koriyama, Fukushima)
- Iwaki Furukawa (Iwaki, Fukushima)
- Merry (Fukushima, Fukushima)
- Oyama Club (Morioka, Iwate)
- Parafrente Yonezawa (Yonezawa, Yamagata)
- Primeiro Fukushima (Fukushima prefecture)
- Ricoh Industry Tohoku (Shibata, Miyagi) (C)
- FC La Universidad de Sendai Segunda (Sendai, Miyagi) (Un)

=== Kantō Soccer League (KSL) ===
==== Division 1 ====
- Aries Toshima (Toshima, Tokyo)
- Edo All United (Edogawa, Tokyo)
- Nankatsu SC (Katsushika, Tokyo)
- FC N. (Inagi, Tokyo) (Un)
- RKD Ryugasaki (Un)
- Shibuya City FC (Shibuya, Tokyo)
- Toho Titanium (Kanagawa Prefecture)
- Toin University of Yokohama FC (Yokohama, Kanagawa) (Un)
- Tokyo 23 (Special wards of Tokyo)
- Tokyo United (Bunkyō, Tokyo)

==== Division 2 ====
- Atsugi Hayabusa (Atsugi, Kanagawa)
- Coedo Kawagoe (Kawagoe, Saitama)
- Esperanza SC (Yokohama, Kanagawa)
- Hitachi Building System SC (Chiyoda, Tokyo) (C)
- Joyful Honda Tsukuba (Tsukuba, Ibaraki) (C)
- Onodera FC (Yokohama, Kanagawa)
- Tochigi City U-25 (Tochigi, Tochigi)
- Tokyo International University (Sakado, Saitama) (Un)
- Tonan Maebashi (Maebashi, Gunma)
- Vertfee Yaita (Yaita, Tochigi)

=== Hokushin'etsu League (HFL) ===
==== Division 1 ====
- '05 Kamo FC (Kamo, Niigata) (Un)
- Artista Asama (Tōmi, Nagano)
- Fukui United (Fukui, Fukui)
- FC Hokuriku (Kanazawa, Ishikawa) (Un)
- JSC FC (Seirō, Niigata) (aka. College of Upward Players in Soccer or CUPS)
- Niigata UHW (Niigata, Niigata) (Un)
- SR Komatsu (Komatsu, Ishikawa)
- Toyama Shinjo Club (Toyama, Toyama)

==== Division 2 ====
- FC Abies (Chino, Nagano)
- Antelope Shoijiri (Shiojiri, Nagano)
- CUPS Seirō (Seirō, Niigata) (Japan Soccer College "B" team)
- Kanazawa Gakuin University (Kanazawa, Ishikawa) (Un)
- FC Matsucelona (Matsumoto, Nagano) (Un)
- N-Style Toyama (Toyama)
- NUHW FC (Niigata, Niigata) (Un B team)
- Sakai Phoenix (Sakai, Fukui)

=== Tōkai League ===
==== Division 1 ====
- Atletico Suzuka
- Chukyo University FC (Toyota, Aichi) (Un)
- Fujieda City Hall (Fujieda, Shizuoka)
- Gakunan F. Mosuperio (Gakunan, Shizuoka)
- FC Ise-Shima (Shima, Mie)
- AS Kariya (Kariya, Aichi)
- FC Kariya (Kariya, Aichi)
- Vencendor Mie UC (Tsu, Mie)
- Wyvern FC (Kariya, Aichi)

==== Division 2 ====
- Chukyo Univ. FC (Toyota, Aichi) (Un)
- FC Gifu Second (Gifu, Gifu) (FC Gifu "B" team)
- Nagoya SC (Nagoya, Aichi)
- Rajil FC Higashimikawa (Nagoya, Aichi)
- Sports & Society Izu (Izu, Shizuoka)
- Tokai FC (Nagoya, Aichi)
- Tokai Gakuen FC (Nagoya, Aichi) (Un)
- Yazaki Valente (Shimada, Shizuoka)

=== Kansai League ===
==== Division 1 ====
- Arterivo Wakayama (Wakayama, Wakayama)
- Asuka FC (Kashihara, Nara)
- FC AWJ (Awaji, Hyōgo)
- Basara Hyōgo (Akashi, Hyōgo) (renamed from FC Easy 02 Akashi)
- Cento Cuore Harima (Harima, Hyōgo)
- Kobe FC 1970 (Kobe)
- Laranja Kyoto (Kyoto, Kyoto)
- Velago Ikoma (Ikoma, Nara) (relocated from Lagend Shiga)
- Moriyama Samurai 2000 (Moriyama, Shiga)

==== Division 2 ====
- Hannan University Club (Matsubara, Osaka) (Un)
- Kandai FC 2008 (Suita, Osaka) (Un)
- Kyoto Shiko Club (Kyoto, Kyoto)
- AC Middle Range (Higashiyodogawa, Osaka)
- Ococias Kyoto (Kyoto, Kyoto)
- Osaka Korean FC (Ikuno, Osaka)
- Route 11 (Kishiwada, Osaka)
- St. Andrew's FC (Izumi, Osaka) (Un)

=== Chūgoku League ===
- Baleine Shimonoseki (Shimonoseki, Yamaguchi)
- Banmel Tottori (Tottori, Tottori)
- Belugarosso Iwami (Hamada, Shimane)
- Eneos Mizushima (Kurashiki, Okayama)
- Fukuyama City FC (Fukuyama, Hiroshima)
- Hatsukaichi FC (Hatsukaichi, Hiroshima)
- International Pacific University FC (Okayama, Okayama) (Un)
- Mitsubishi Motors Mizushima (Kurashiki, Okayama) (C)
- SRC Hiroshima (Hiroshima, Hiroshima)
- Yonago Genki SC (Yonago, Tottori)

=== Shikoku League ===
- KUFC Nankoku (Nankoku, Kōchi) (Un)
- Llamas Kochi (Kōchi, Kōchi)
- Lvnirosso NC (Niihama, Ehime)
- R. Velho Takamatsu (Takamatsu, Kagawa)
- Sonio Takamatsu (Takamatsu, Kagawa)
- Tadotsu FC (Tadotsu, Kagawa)
- FC Tokushima (Tokushima, Tokushima)
- Yamaji FC (Shikokuchūō, Ehime)

=== Kyūshū League (Kyu-League) ===
- Brew Kashima (Kashima, Saga)
- Itazuke FC (Fukuoka, Fukuoka)
- Kawasoe Club (Saga, Saga)
- KMG Holdings FC (Fukuoka, Fukuoka) (C)
- J-Lease FC (Ōita)
- MHI Nagasaki SC (Nagasaki, Nagasaki)
- NIFS Kanoya FC (Kanoya, Kagoshima) (Un)
- Nippon Steel Oita SC (Ōita, Ōita)
- Nobeoka Agata (Nobeoka, Miyazaki)
- Veroskronos Tsuno (Tsuno, Miyazaki)

== Notes ==
- Teams with "L" are JFL teams which have a J.League club license issued for the 2025 season.
- Teams with "C" are company teams.
- Teams with "Un" are feeder (or "B") teams for their universities' main football teams.
- In the Regional Leagues, first divisions equal to Japanese fifth tier of league football, while second divisions equal to the sixth tier. So, regional leagues who only have one single division, such as Shikoku, have teams going straight from the prefectural top divisions to the fifth tier in case of a promotion.

== See also ==
- Japanese association football league system
- List of women's football clubs in Japan
