= Naohiko Minobe =

Japanese footballer and manager

Naohiko Minobe 美濃部 直彦
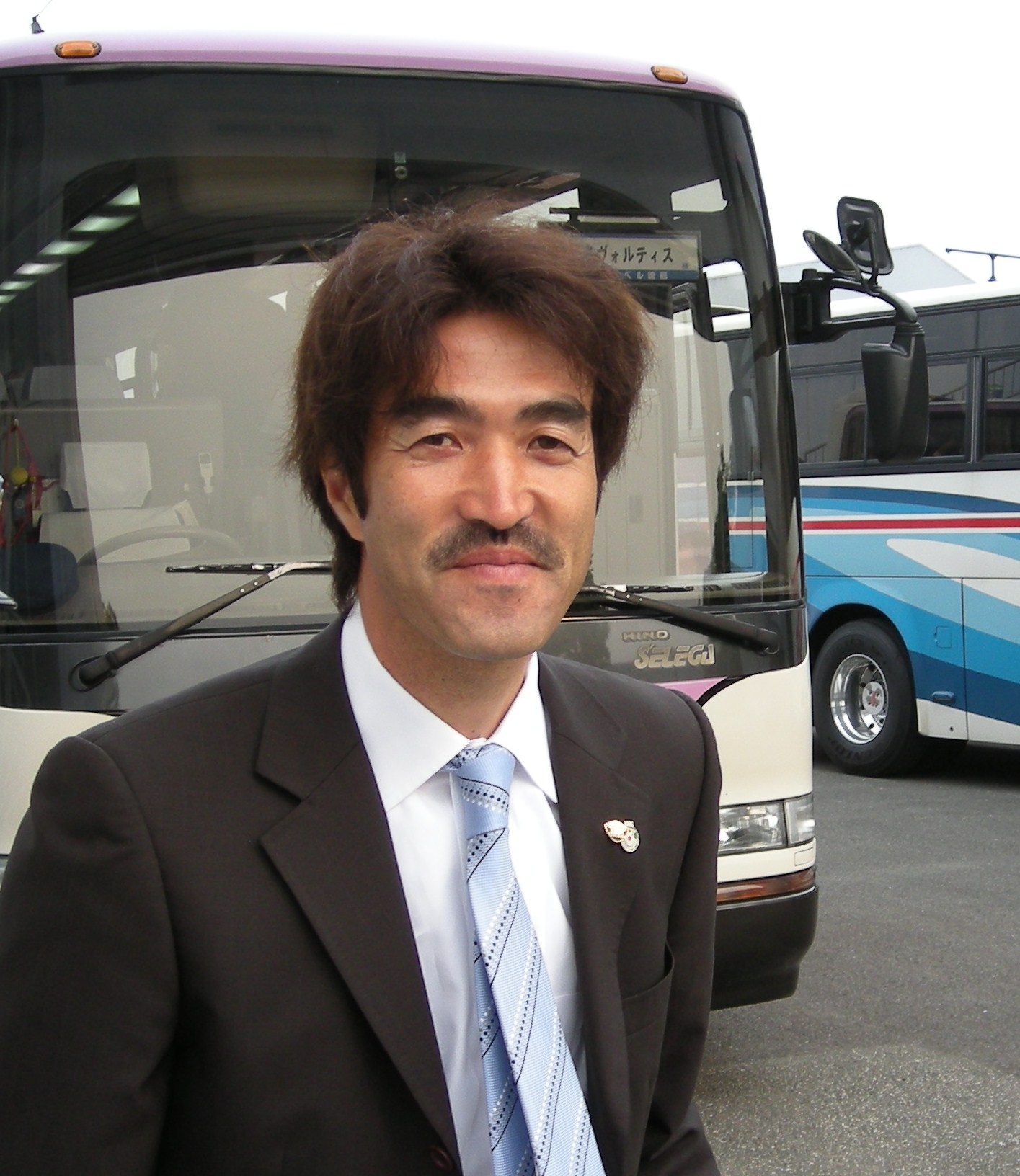

Personal information
- Full name: Naohiko Minobe
- Date of birth: 12 July 1965 (age 61)
- Place of birth: Moriyama, Shiga, Japan
- Height: 1.76 m (5 ft 9 in)
- Position: Defender

Team information
- Current team: Asuka FC (manager)

Youth career
- 1981–1983: Moriyama High School

Senior career*
Years	Team	Apps	(Gls)
1984–1993	Gamba Osaka		
1994–1995	Kyoto Purple Sanga	42	(0)

Managerial career
- 2006–2007: Kyoto Sanga
- 2008–2011: Tokushima Vortis
- 2013–2015: Nagano Parceiro
- 2021–: Asuka FC
Medal record
Gamba Osaka
Winner	Emperor's Cup	1990
- * Club domestic league appearances and goals

Naohiko Minobe (美濃部 直彦, Minobe Naohiko; born July 12, 1965) is a Japanese football manager and former player. He currently is the manager of club, Asuka FC.

== Playing career ==
Minobe was born in Moriyama on July 12, 1965. After graduating from high school, he joined Matsushita Electric (later Gamba Osaka) in 1984. He played many matches mainly as a right back. In 1990, Matsushita Electric won the Emperor's Cup, the first major title in the club’s history. In 1994, Minobe moved to Kyoto Purple Sanga, playing in the Japan Football League. In 1994, he became a captain and played as a regular starter. In 1995, although his opportunity to play decreased, the club finished in second place and was promoted to J1 League. However Minobe retired at the end of the 1995 season without having played in J1 at the club.

== Managerial career ==
After retirement, Minobe became a coach for Kyoto Purple Sanga (later Kyoto Sanga FC) in 1996. He mainly managed the youth team until 2003.

In 2004, he became a coach for top team. In October 2006, manager Koichi Hashiratani was sacked and Minobe became the new manager as Hashiratani’s successor. However the season’s results were bad and the club was relegated to the J2 League. Although he started the season as manager in 2007, he was sacked in October.

In 2008, Minobe signed as manager with J2 club Tokushima Vortis. Although the club finished in bottom place in 2008, the club results improved each season after that and they finished in 4th place in 2011. Minobe resigned at the end of the 2011 season. In 2013, Minibe signed with Japan Football League club AC Nagano Parceiro, and led the club to win the league that year, meaning the club was promoted to the newly formed J3 League for the 2014 season. In 2014, although the club finished the 2nd place, they lost the promotion/relegation series, and were not promoted to J2. In August 2015, although the club place was doing well in 3rd place, Minobe resigned due to health problems.

On 12 January 2021, Minobe was announced officially as the manager of Kansai Soccer League club, Asuka FC at the start of 2021 season. On 24 November 2024, Minobe secured promotion to Japan Football League for the first time in their history for the 2025 season after defeating J-Lease FC 2-1 in Takebishi Stadium Kyoto in the Japanese Regional Football Champions League final round.

== Club statistics ==
Club performance			League		Cup		League Cup		Total	
Season	Club	League	Apps	Goals	Apps	Goals	Apps	Goals	Apps	Goals
Japan			League		Emperor's Cup		J.League Cup		Total	
1984	Matsushita Electric	JSL Division 2								
1985/86	Matsushita Electric	JSL Division 2								
1986/87	Matsushita Electric	JSL Division 1	18	0						
1987/88	Matsushita Electric	JSL Division 2								
1988/89	Matsushita Electric	JSL Division 1	3	0			1	0	4	0
1989/90	Matsushita Electric	JSL Division 1	7	0			0	0	7	0
1990/91	Matsushita Electric	JSL Division 1	21	1			0	0	21	1
1991/92	Matsushita Electric	JSL Division 1	18	1			3	0	21	1
1992	Gamba Osaka	J1 League	-		1	1	2	1	3	2
1993	Gamba Osaka	J1 League	13	2	0	0	4	0	17	2
1994	Kyoto Purple Sanga	Football League	29	0	3	0	-		32	0
1995	Kyoto Purple Sanga	Football League	13	0	0	0	-		13	0
Total			122	4	4	1	10	1	136	6

== Managerial statistics ==
As of the start for 2025 season.

Team	From	To	Record				
Team	From	To	G	W	D	L	Win %
Kyoto Sanga	2006	2007	49	20	15	14	40.82
Tokushima Vortis	2008	2011	167	60	37	70	35.93
Nagano Parceiro	2014	2015	55	33	12	10	60.00
Asuka FC	2021	present	63	38	3	22	60.32
Total			334	151	67	116	45.21

== Honours ==
=== Manager ===
Asuka FC

- Kansai Soccer League Div 1: 2024
- Japanese Regional Football Champions League: 2024
