= Takuma Goto =

Japanese footballer

Personal information
- Full name: Takuma Goto
- Date of birth: 16 July 1997 (age 29)
- Place of birth: Tokushima, Japan
- Height: 1.65 m (5 ft 5 in)
- Position: Midfielder

Team information
- Current team: Nara Club (on loan from FC Tiamo Hirakata)
- Number: 17

Youth career
- –2015: Tokushima Vortis
- 2016–2019: Kansai UIS

Senior career*
Years	Team	Apps	(Gls)
2020	FC Tokushima	7	(5)
2021–2024	Kamatamare Sanuki	64	(3)
2024-	FC Tiamo Hirakata	59	(7)
2026-	→ Nara Club (loan)	12	(0)
- * Club domestic league appearances and goals as of 25 August 2026

Takuma Goto (後藤 卓磨, Goto Takuma; born 16 July 1997) is a Japanese footballer currently playing as a midfielder for Nara Club, on loan from FC Tiamo Hirakata.

== Career statistics ==
=== Club ===
As of 9 July 2021.

Club	Season	League			National Cup		League Cup		Other		Total	
Club	Season	Division	Apps	Goals	Apps	Goals	Apps	Goals	Apps	Goals	Apps	Goals
FC Tokushima	2020	Shikoku Soccer League	7	5	2 (Note: Appearances in the Emperor's Cup)	0	–		3 (Note: Appearances in the Japanese Regional Football League Competition)	1	12	6
Kamatamare Sanuki	2021	J3 League	11	0	0	0	–		0	0	11	0
Career total			18	5	2	0	0	0	3	1	23	6
