= Lagend Shiga FC =

Japanese football club

Lagend Shiga FC レイジェンド滋賀FC
- Full name: Lagend Shiga Football Club
- Founded: 2005; 21 years ago as Shiga FC
- Dissolved: 2025; 1 year ago (became Velago Ikoma)
- Stadium: Yasugawa Historical Park Soccer Stadium (Big Lake); Moriyama, Shiga
- Capacity: 1,200
- Chairman: Yoshihiro Yamauchi
- 2024: KSL Div 1, 6th of 8
- Website: lagendshigafc.com

Lagend Shiga FC (レイジェンド滋賀FC, Reijendo Shiga Efushi) is a former football (soccer) club based in Moriyama, which was located in Shiga Prefecture in Japan. They last played in the Kansai Soccer League in 2024, which is part of Japanese Regional Leagues. The club was announced it was dissolved in 2025 after 2024 season was completed.

== History ==
The club was founded in 2005 under the denomination of Shiga FC; it quickly reached the Kansai Soccer League, despite having alternative form and results between 1st and 2nd division. In 2010, the name changed to Tojitsu Shiga FC, with the goal of aiming towards becoming a professional football club.

In January 2008, they won the Kansai Prefectural Soccer League Finals and were promoted to the second division of the Kansai Soccer League. In 2008, they won the second division of the Kansai League and were promoted to the first division, but the following year, 2009, they finished seventh in the league and were relegated to the second division.

The club was renamed again in 2011, as Lagend Shiga FC: the denomination came from the mix of two English words, "Lake" (due to the presence of Lake Biwa in Shiga Prefecture) and "Legend", with a renovate will of reaching pro-football. In 2015 it was also mentioned a possible merger with MIO Biwako Shiga, but the deal was never completed and then abandoned in September of that year.

In 2017, Lagend Shiga, alongside St. Andrew's University FC, were relegated to the second division of the Kansai Soccer League, but returned the following year, winning promotion to the 2019 Kansai Soccer League 1st Division. In 2020, they finished at the bottom of the league, but due to the COVID-19 global pandemic outbreak, there were no relegation or promotion between divisions in the Kansai Soccer League. Then, they were able to play the 2021 Kansai Soccer League in the 1st Division, finishing 6th in the league.

On 24 January 2025, the club announced that Lagend Shiga FC would disband and that the management corporation would relocate to become Velago Ikoma, from the city of Ikoma, Nara. The club activities of Lagend Shiga FC came to an end after 2024 season.

== Stadium ==
The club played most of the matches at the Yasugawa Historical Park Soccer Stadium (Big Lake) in Moriyama in Shiga prefecture. The capacity is stated at 1,200.
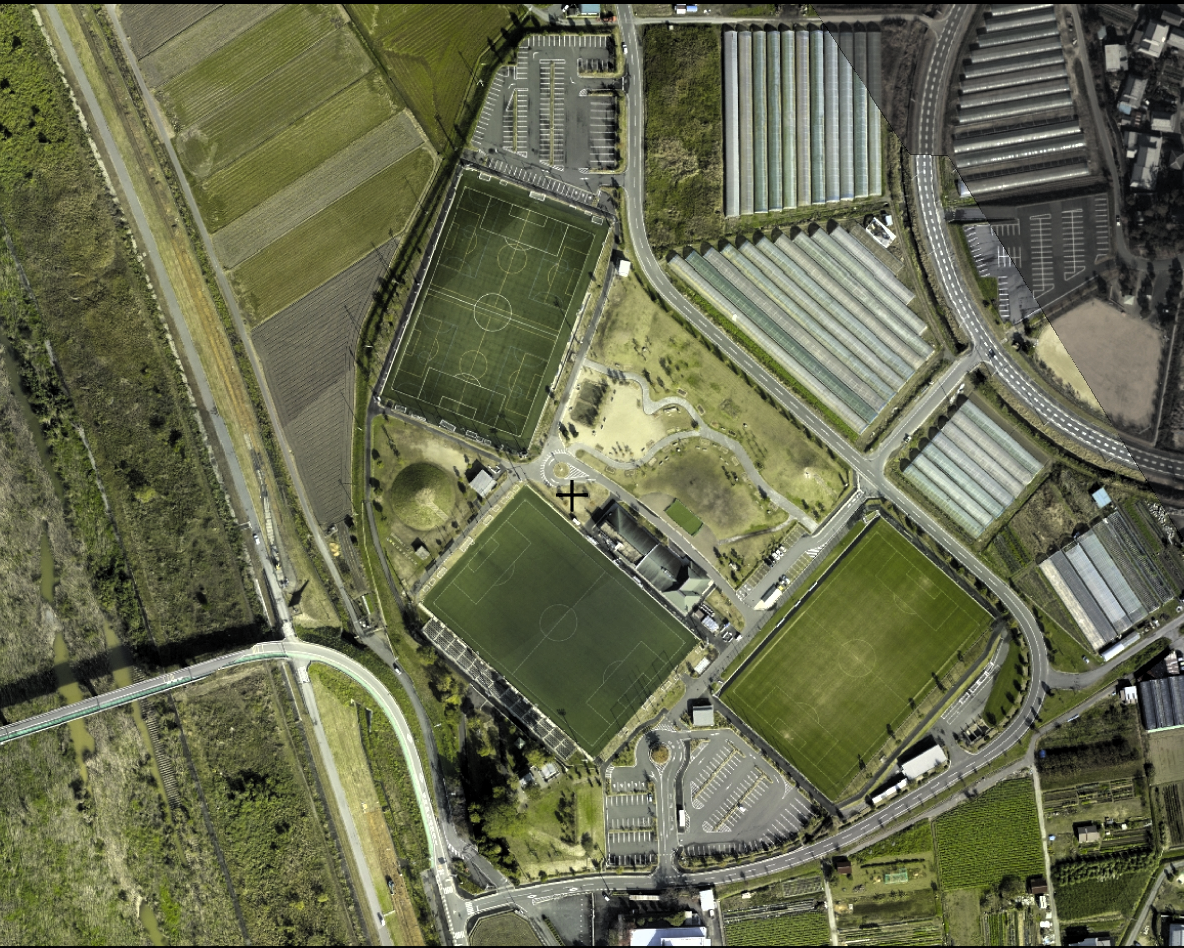

== League record ==
Champions	Runners-up	Third place	Promoted	Relegated

League											Emperor's Cup	Shakaijin Cup
Season	League	Pos	P	W	D	L	F	A	GD	Pts	Emperor's Cup	Shakaijin Cup
Shiga FC
2005	Shiga Prefecture Division 1	3rd	12	8	2	2	54	12	42	26	Did not qualify	Did not qualify
2006	Shiga Prefecture Division 1	1st	12	12	0	0	68	5	63	36	Did not qualify	Did not qualify
2007	Shiga Prefecture Division 1	2nd	12	10	1	1	76	7	69	31	Did not qualify	Did not qualify
2008	Kansai Soccer League (Div. 2)	1st	14	12	1	1	54	17	37	37		1st round
2009	Kansai Soccer League (Div. 1)	7th	14	4	1	9	22	39	-17	13		Did not qualify
Tojitsu Shiga FC
2010	Kansai Soccer League (Div. 2)	1st	14	10	2	2	46	16	30	32		Did not qualify
Lagend Shiga FC
2011	Kansai Soccer League (Div. 1)	7th	14	2	5	7	15	23	-8	11	Did not qualify	1st round
2012	Kansai Soccer League (Div. 2)	2nd	14	10	2	2	41	19	22	32		2nd round
2013	Kansai Soccer League (Div. 1)	3rd	14	8	2	4	24	14	10	26		2nd round
2014	Kansai Soccer League (Div. 1)	6th	14	4	3	7	17	23	-6	15		1st round
2015	Kansai Soccer League (Div. 1)	4th	14	7	3	4	26	26	0	24	Did not qualify	2nd round
2016	Kansai Soccer League (Div. 1)	6th	14	4	4	6	20	24	-4	16	Did not qualify	
2017	Kansai Soccer League (Div. 1)	7th	14	2	2	10	7	21	-14	8	Did not qualify	
2018	Kansai Soccer League (Div. 2)	2nd	14	9	3	2	26	13	13	30	Did not qualify	
2019	Kansai Soccer League (Div. 1)	6th	14	3	3	8	14	28	-14	12	Did not qualify	
2020	Kansai Soccer League (Div. 1)	8th	7	0	2	5	1	11	-10	2	Did not qualify	
2021	Kansai Soccer League (Div. 1)	6th	14	3	5	6	18	21	-3	14	Did not qualify	
2022	Kansai Soccer League (Div. 1)	5th	14	6	1	7	21	16	5	19	Did not qualify	
2023	Kansai Soccer League (Div. 1)	2nd	14	7	4	3	20	13	7	25	Did not qualify	
2024	Kansai Soccer League (Div. 1)	6th	14	4	3	7	14	21	-7	15	Did not qualify	Round of 32

Key

- Pos. = Position in league; P = Games played; W = Games won; D = Games drawn; L = Games lost; F = Goals scored; A = Goals conceded; GD = Goals difference; Pts = Points gained

== Honours ==
Lagend Shiga FC honours
Honour	No.	Years
Shiga Prefecture Division 1	1	2006
Kansai Soccer League 2nd Division	2	2008, 2010

== Current squad ==
As of 23 August 2023.

Note: Flags indicate national team as defined under FIFA eligibility rules; some limited exceptions apply. Players may hold more than one non-FIFA nationality.

No.	Pos.	Nation	Player
1	GK	JPN	Tsuyoshi Saito
2	DF	JPN	Michito Sugawara
3	DF	JPN	Ryo Okamoto
4	DF	JPN	Kei Hasegawa
5	DF	JPN	Akito Takemoto
6	DF	JPN	Yuma Ito
7	MF	JPN	Minato Yoshida
8	MF	JPN	Akito Nakai
9	FW	JPN	Kazuya Oguni
10	MF	JPN	Kazuto Uno
11	MF	JPN	Yoji Ogawa
13	DF	JPN	Torai Moriyama
14	MF	JPN	Hiroki Matsushita
15	FW	JPN	Kaito Ikeda
16	DF	JPN	Hidenori Shirai
17	FW	JPN	Kyosei Satake
18	FW	JPN	Takashi Takimoto
19	DF	JPN	Masato Osugi

No.	Pos.	Nation	Player
20	DF	JPN	Juta Nakanishi
21	GK	JPN	Yushin Amano
22	DF	JPN	Masaharu Maeda
23	FW	JPN	Shogo Nakamura
24	DF	JPN	Taiki Shimizu
25	MF	JPN	Kotaro Kuroiwa
26	FW	JPN	Keigo Tarui
28	MF	JPN	Kaisei Toyama
29	DF	JPN	Tsubasa Oba
30	MF	JPN	Yushi Hada
31	GK	JPN	Hiroto Kamei
32	MF	JPN	Kazuki Shishido
33	MF	JPN	Seigo Nagao
35	MF	JPN	Satoru Morikawa
36	MF	JPN	Keigo Tanaka
37	GK	JPN	Shota Nakano
39	DF	JPN	Shinri Ono
