= 2019 Japanese Regional Leagues =

Japanese amateur leagues football season

Japanese Regional Leagues
- Season: 2019
- Promoted: Iwaki FC; Kochi United

The 2019 Japanese Regional Leagues were a competition between parallel association football leagues ranking at the fifth and sixth tiers of the Japan Football League.
Statistics of Japanese Regional Leagues in the 2019 season.

== Champions list ==
Region	Champions
Hokkaido	Hokkaido Tokachi Sky Earth
Tohoku	Iwaki FC
Kantō	Vonds Ichihara
Hokushinetsu	Fukui United FC
Tōkai	FC Kariya
Kansai	Ococias Kyoto AC
Chūgoku	SRC Hiroshima
Shikoku	Kochi United SC
Kyushu	Okinawa SV

== Hokkaido ==
Pos	Team	Pld	W	D	L	GF	GA	GD	Pts	Qualification or relegation
1	Hokkaido Tokachi Sky Earth (C, Q)	14	12	2	0	61	7	+54	38	Regional Champions League
2	Sapporo FC	14	11	0	3	51	22	+29	33	
3	Norbritz Hokkaido	14	8	3	3	49	19	+30	27	
4	Nippon Steel Muroran SC	14	6	3	5	40	28	+12	21	
5	Iwamizawa FC Hokusyukai	14	5	0	9	28	60	−32	15	
6	Nippon Express FC	14	4	2	8	29	47	−18	14	
7	Toyota Motors Hokkaido SC (R)	14	3	1	10	15	56	−41	10	Relegated to Sapporo Prefectural League
8	Real Superbe Kushiro (R)	14	1	1	12	19	53	−34	4	Relegated to Sapporo Prefectural League

Source: rsssf.org
Rules for classification: 1) Points; 2) Goal difference; 3) Goals scored
(C) Champions; (Q) Qualified for the phase indicated; (R) Relegated

== Tohoku ==
Division 1
Pos	Team	Pld	W	D	L	GF	GA	GD	Pts	Qualification or relegation
1	Iwaki FC (C, Q, P)	18	15	3	0	104	4	+100	48	Qualified for the Regional Champions League & Promoted to JFL
2	Blancdieu Hirosaki (Q)	18	13	4	1	82	14	+68	43	Qualified for the Regional Champions League
3	Cobaltore Onagawa	18	12	4	2	52	15	+37	40	
4	Fuji Club 2003	18	7	3	8	32	40	−8	24	
5	Morioka Zebra	18	8	0	10	44	67	−23	24	
6	FC Ganju Iwate	18	6	3	9	42	56	−14	21	
7	Nippon Steel Kamaishi	18	5	3	10	27	55	−28	18	
8	FC Primeiro	18	5	1	12	24	70	−46	16	
9	Saruta Kogyo (Note: With Iwaki FC's promotion to the JFL, Saruta Kogyo, which would normally have been relegated to the Second Division North but remain in the First Division.)	18	4	2	12	30	51	−21	14	
10	Akita FC Cambiare (R)	18	3	1	14	21	86	−65	10	Relegated to Tohoku Division 2 North

Source: rsssf.org
(C) Champions; (P) Promoted; (Q) Qualified for the phase indicated; (R) Relegated

Division 2 North
Pos	Team	Pld	W	D	L	GF	GA	GD	Pts	Qualification or relegation
1	Omiya SC (C, P)	18	17	1	0	65	13	+52	52	Promoted to Division 1
2	TDK Shinwakai	18	9	4	5	41	24	+17	31	
3	Mizusawa SC (Note: Matchday 17 between Mizusawa Club and Maritime Self-Defense Force Hachinohe was not played, and the record was 0-0 and neither team added one point.)	18	9	3	6	45	22	+23	29	
4	JMSDF Hachinohe (Note: Matchday 17 between Mizusawa Club and Maritime Self-Defense Force Hachinohe was not played, and the record was 0-0 and neither team added one point.)	18	8	4	6	39	38	+1	27	
5	NewPearl Hiraizumi Maesawa	18	8	3	7	33	39	−6	27	
6	Hokuto Bank SC	18	8	2	8	43	39	+4	26	
7	Akita Univ. of Med. Dept. FC (R)	18	8	1	9	52	39	+13	25	Left the league system
8	North Asia University (R)	18	5	4	9	33	38	−5	19	Left the league system
9	Gonohe SC (Note: Since two teams from Division 1 are normally relegated to the Division 2 North/South, the number of relegation spots to the provincial league was increased from 3 to 4. Iwaki FC was promoted to the JFL and the relegation of teams from Division 1 to Division 2 was reduced from 2 to 1, so the relegation quota to the prefectural league returned to 3 again, but due to the decline of promotion of the top teams of Akita Prefecture and Iwate Prefecture League, and the withdrawal of Akita University School of Medicine, North Asia University FC, and Iwate Club from the league, Gonohe SC remained in Division 2 North, making 8 teams qualifying to play in this league for 2020 season.)	18	6	1	11	30	71	−41	19	
10	Iwate SC (R)	18	0	1	17	14	72	−58	1	Left the league system

Source: rsssf.org
Rules for classification: 1) Points; 2) Goal difference; 3) Goals scored
(C) Champions; (P) Promoted to Division 1; (R) Relegated

Division 2 South
Pos	Team	Pld	W	D	L	GF	GA	GD	Pts	Promotion or relegation
1	FC Sendai University (C, P)	18	16	2	0	74	14	+60	50	Promoted to Division 1
2	Shichigahama SC	18	15	1	2	80	15	+65	46	
3	Ricoh Industry Tohoku	18	10	2	6	41	28	+13	32	
4	Sendai Sasuke FC	18	8	5	5	38	24	+14	29	
5	Oyama SC	18	8	3	7	42	50	−8	27	
6	Merry	18	8	2	8	38	39	−1	26	
7	Bandits Iwaki	18	3	6	9	30	57	−27	15	
8	Mikawa SC	18	3	4	11	26	58	−32	13	
9	Iwaki Furukawa FC (R)	18	4	1	13	23	57	−34	13	Relegated to Fukushima Prefectural League
10	FFC Matsushita (R)	18	2	0	16	26	76	−50	6	Relegated to Fukushima Prefectural League

Source: rsssf.org
(C) Champions; (P) Promoted to Division 1; (R) Relegated

== Kantō ==
Division 1
Pos	Team	Pld	W	D	L	GF	GA	GD	Pts	Qualification or relegation
1	Vonds Ichihara (C, Q)	18	15	1	2	40	12	+28	46	
2	Tokyo United	18	12	1	5	32	16	+16	37	
3	Tochigi City	18	9	5	4	30	15	+15	32	
4	Briobecca Urayasu	18	7	3	8	26	23	+3	24	
5	Hitachi Building Systems	18	5	7	6	17	18	−1	22	
6	RKU Dragons	18	5	7	6	21	28	−7	22	
7	Joyful Honda Tsukuba	18	5	6	7	18	27	−9	21	
8	Tokyo 23 (O)	18	5	3	10	20	33	−13	18	
9	Toin University of Yokohama (R)	18	4	2	12	16	30	−14	14	Relegated to Division 2
10	Yokohama Takeru (R)	18	3	5	10	12	30	−18	14	Relegated to Division 2

Source: rsssf.org
(C) Champions; (O) Play-off winners; (Q) Qualified for the Japan Regional Football Champions League; (R) Relegated

Division 2
Pos	Team	Pld	W	D	L	GF	GA	GD	Pts	Qualification or relegation
1	Criacao Shinjuku (C, P)	18	14	1	3	42	20	+22	43	Promoted to Division 1
2	Toho Titanium	18	11	2	5	27	12	+15	35	
3	Esperanza SC	18	10	5	3	33	23	+10	35	
4	Tonan Maebashi	18	8	4	6	39	30	+9	28	
5	Saitama SC	18	8	2	8	27	28	−1	26	
6	Tokyo International University	18	6	3	9	23	32	−9	21	
7	Identy Mirai	18	5	4	9	19	25	−6	19	
8	Vertfee Yaita (R)	18	4	6	8	18	24	−6	18	Relegated to Tochigi Prefectural League
9	Waseda United (R)	18	4	4	10	21	36	−15	16	Relegated to Tokyo Metropolitan Prefectural League
10	Kanagawa Teachers (R)	18	2	5	11	25	44	−19	11	Relegated to Kanagawa Prefectural League

Source: rsssf.org
(C) Champions; (P) Promoted to Division 1; (R) Relegated

== Hokushinetsu ==
Division 1
Pos	Team	Pld	W	D	L	GF	GA	GD	Pts	Qualification or relegation
1	Fukui United (C, Q)	14	13	1	0	74	7	+67	40	
2	Artista Asama	14	12	1	1	48	7	+41	37	
3	Japan Soccer College	14	8	2	4	27	22	+5	26	
4	Toyama Shinjo	14	5	4	5	27	31	−4	19	
5	Sakai Phoenix	14	5	0	9	20	45	−25	15	
6	FC Hokuriku	14	3	2	9	23	33	−10	11	
7	'05 Kamo	14	2	2	10	14	37	−23	8	
8	Ueda Gentian (R)	14	2	0	12	15	66	−51	6	Relegated to Hokushinetsu Division 2

Source: rsssf.org
(C) Champions; (Q) Qualified for the Japan Regional Football Champions League; (R) Relegated

Division 2
Pos	Team	Pld	W	D	L	GF	GA	GD	Pts	Qualification or relegation
1	Niigata University of Health & Welfare (C, P)	14	14	0	0	69	8	+61	42	Promoted to Division 1
2	CUPS Seiro	14	7	3	4	34	21	+13	24	
3	Hokuriku University FC Futures	14	6	2	6	20	27	−7	20	
4	FC Matsucelona	14	5	3	6	16	22	−6	18	
5	'09 Keidai	14	4	4	6	23	40	−17	16	
6	Antelope Shiojiri	14	5	2	7	28	32	−4	17	
7	Nagaoka Billboard	14	2	7	5	15	34	−19	13	
8	Ono FC (R)	14	1	3	10	10	31	−21	6	Relegated to Fukui Prefectural League

Source: rsssf.org
(C) Champions; (P) Promoted to Division 1; (R) Relegated

== Tōkai ==
Division 1
Pos	Team	Pld	W	D	L	GF	GA	GD	Pts	Qualification or relegation
1	FC Kariya (C, Q)	14	12	0	2	44	14	+30	36	
2	Ise-Shima	14	11	1	2	39	15	+24	34	
3	Tokai Gakuen University	14	7	3	4	36	27	+9	24	
4	Fujieda City Hall	14	5	4	5	32	25	+7	19	
5	Yazaki Valente	14	4	3	7	22	30	−8	15	
6	Chukyo University	14	4	0	10	18	34	−16	12	
7	Toyota FC (R)	14	3	2	9	22	39	−17	11	Relegated to Tōkai Division 2
8	FC Gifu SECOND (R)	14	3	1	10	29	58	−29	10	Relegated to Tōkai Division 2

Source: rsssf.org
(C) Champions; (Q) Qualified for the Japan Regional Football Champions League; (R) Relegated

Division 2
Pos	Team	Pld	W	D	L	GF	GA	GD	Pts	Qualification or relegation
1	Chukyo University B (C, P)	14	9	4	1	41	15	+26	31	Promoted to Tōkai Division 1
2	Tokoha University Hamamatsu (P)	14	9	3	2	30	13	+17	30	Promoted to Tōkai Division 1
3	Rivielta Toyokawa	14	8	4	2	36	22	+14	28	
4	Nagoya SC	14	6	1	7	22	25	−3	19	
5	FC Bonbonera GIFU	14	5	1	8	23	27	−4	16	
6	Nagara Club	14	4	3	7	14	23	−9	15	
7	Toyota Industries (R)	14	3	2	9	22	37	−15	11	Relegated to the Aichi Prefectural League
8	FC Ogaki Kogans (R)	14	2	2	10	23	49	−26	8	Relegated to Gifu Prefectural League

Source: rsssf.org
(C) Champions; (P) Promoted to Division 1; (R) Relegated

== Kansai ==
Division 1
Pos	Team	Pld	W	D	L	GF	GA	GD	Pts	Qualification or relegation
1	Ococias Kyoto (C, Q)	14	10	4	0	39	12	+27	34	
2	TIAMO Hirakata (Q)	14	10	3	1	40	17	+23	33	
3	Arterivo Wakayama	14	7	1	6	27	20	+7	22	
4	Kandai FC 2008	14	5	5	4	26	22	+4	20	
5	Banditonce Kakogawa	14	6	2	6	22	23	−1	20	
6	Lagend Shiga	14	3	3	8	14	28	−14	12	
7	St. Andrew's FC (R)	14	3	2	9	15	37	−22	11	Relegated to Kansai Division 2
8	Hannan University (R)	14	2	0	12	9	33	−24	6	Relegated to Kansai Division 2

Source: rsssf.org
(C) Champions; (Q) Qualified for the Japan Regional Football Champions League; (R) Relegated

Division 2
Pos	Team	Pld	W	D	L	GF	GA	GD	Pts	Qualification or relegation
1	Laranja Kyoto (P)	14	10	3	1	42	11	+31	33	Promoted to Kansai Division 1
2	Porvenir Kashihara (P)	14	9	2	3	34	12	+22	29	Promoted to Kansai Division 1
3	Kyoto Shiko	14	9	0	5	26	16	+10	27	
4	Kandai Club 2010	14	6	2	6	23	19	+4	20	
5	FC Easy Akashi	14	5	5	4	19	23	−4	20	
6	Takasago Mineiro	14	5	3	6	21	22	−1	18	
7	Biwako Seikei HIRA (R)	14	4	1	9	17	32	−15	13	Participated in the playoff match and was relegated to Shiga Prefectural League
8	Renaiss Gakuen (R)	14	0	0	14	13	60	−47	0	Relegated to Shiga Prefectural League

Source: rsssf.org
(P) Promoted to Division 1; (R) Relegated

=== Promotion/relegation playoff ===
13 January 2020
13:00

Biwako Seikei Sports University HIRA （Kansai Soccer League 9th place）	1–5	Kyoto City Fire Department (Kansai Soccer League Promotion Championship runner-up)

Takebishi Stadium Kyoto
- Kyoto City Fire Department was promoted to the Kansai 2nd Division, while the defeated Biwako Seikei Sports University HIRA was relegated to the Shiga Prefecture League.

== Chūgoku ==
Pos	Team	Pld	W	D	L	GF	GA	GD	Pts	Qualification or relegation
1	SRC Hiroshima (C, Q)	18	15	2	1	61	12	+49	47	
2	Mitsubishi Mizushima	18	15	2	1	60	13	+47	47	
3	International Pacific University	18	11	0	7	37	28	+9	33	
4	FC Baleine Shimonoseki	18	10	2	6	45	23	+22	32	
5	JXTG Energy Mizushima	18	8	3	7	40	33	+7	27	
6	Fuji Xerox Hiroshima	18	6	4	8	29	41	−12	22	
7	NTN Okayama	18	5	3	10	25	39	−14	18	
8	Hamada FC Cosmos	18	2	6	10	20	52	−32	12	
9	Harada Kogyo (R)	18	3	2	13	14	64	−50	11	Relegated to Hiroshima Prefectural League
10	Hatsukaichi FC (R)	18	2	2	14	22	48	−26	8	Relegated to Hiroshima Prefectural League

Source: rsssf.org
(C) Champions; (Q) Qualified for the Japan Regional Football Champions League; (R) Relegated

== Shikoku ==
Pos	Team	Pld	W	D	L	GF	GA	GD	Pts	Qualification or relegation
1	Kochi United (C, Q, P)	14	14	0	0	92	4	+88	42	Promoted to JFL
2	FC Tokushima (Q)	14	12	0	2	49	11	+38	36	
3	KUFC Nankoku	14	8	1	5	60	23	+37	25	
4	Tadotsu FC	14	6	0	8	23	40	−17	18	
5	R.Velho Takamatsu	14	5	1	8	22	38	−16	16	
6	Niisho Club	14	4	2	8	28	49	−21	14	
7	Llamas Kochi	14	3	1	10	10	35	−25	10	
8	Koyo Sealing Techno	14	1	1	12	11	95	−84	4	

Source: rsssf.org
(C) Champions; (P) Promoted; (Q) Qualified for the Japan Regional Football Champions League

== Kyushu ==
Pos	Team	Pld	W	DW	DL	L	GF	GA	GD	Pts	
1	Okinawa SV (C, Q)	18	17	0	0	1	64	7	+57	51	Qualified for the Japan Regional Football Champions League
2	J.FC Miyazaki	18	15	0	1	2	49	15	+34	46	
3	Saga LIXIL FC	18	9	1	0	8	37	31	+6	29	
4	Kumamoto Teachers	18	9	0	0	9	30	44	−14	27	
5	Kaiho Bank	18	7	2	1	8	34	39	−5	26	
6	Nippon Steel Oita	18	8	0	1	9	31	26	+5	25	
7	NIFS Kanoya	18	7	1	1	9	29	29	0	24	
8	Kawasoe Club	18	6	0	2	10	24	33	−9	20	
9	Kyushu Mitsubishi Motors	18	5	1	0	12	16	42	−26	17	Participated in the playoff match
10	Kyushu Sogo Sports College	18	1	1	0	16	12	61	−49	5	Relegated to Oita Prefectural League

Source: rsssf.org
(C) Champion; (Q) Qualified to the phase indicated

=== Promotion/relegation playoff ===
19 January 2020
13:00

Kyushu Mitsubishi Motors （Kyushu Football League 9th place）	4–1	Miyake Club (Kyushu Football League Promotion Championship runner-up)

Fukuoka Football Center D Ground
- Kyushu Mitsubishi Motors won, therefore stayed in Kyushu league.
