= All Japan Club Teams Football Tournament =

- Founded: 1994; 32 years ago
- Region: Japan
- Teams: 16
- Current champions: Osaka City SC (1st title) (2025)
- Most championships: Suzuka Club (3 titles)
- 2025

The All Japan Club Teams Soccer Tournament (Japanese: 全国クラブチームサッカー選手権大会, Hepburn: Zenkoku Kurabu Chīmu Sakkā Senshuken Taikai), officially called the All Japan Club Teams Soccer Tournament, is a football (soccer) cup competition in Japan.

It is run by the Japan Football Association, operating in a similar way to the Shakaijin Cup. It only involves teams that plays in their respective prefectural leagues around Japan. The 47 existing prefectural leagues combined forms the 7th tier of league football in Japan, a level below the Japanese Regional Leagues.

== List of winners ==
Year	Winner		Score		Runner-up
1994	Vankei Maki FC	(Hokkaido)	1–0	(Mie Prefecture)	Cosmo Oil SC
1995	Hiroshima FC	(Hiroshima Prefecture)	3–0	(Osaka Prefecture)	Sano Club
1996	Tsuda SC	(Hyōgo Prefecture)	1–0	(Ōita Prefecture)	FC Elan
1997	Obihiro FC	(Hokkaido)	2–1	(Aichi Prefecture)	Kasugai Club
1998	Suzuka Club	(Mie Prefecture)	2–0	(Hiroshima Prefecture)	Hiroshima Kogyo Club
1999	Suzuka Club	(Mie Prefecture)	1–0	(Hiroshima Prefecture)	Hiroshima Kogyo Club
2000	Hikawa Club	(Yamanashi Prefecture)	2–1	(Kōchi Prefecture)	Miwa Club
2001	Suzuka Club	(Mie Prefecture)	2–1	(Kagoshima Prefecture)	Izumi SC
2002	Kashima Sawayaka FC	(Ibaraki Prefecture)	1–1 (4–1 pen.)	(Hyōgo Prefecture)	Rokuryo FC Himeji
2003	Mutsuura FC	(Kanagawa Prefecture)	5–1	(Ibaraki Prefecture)	Club Dragons
2004	Aichi FC	(Aichi Prefecture)	1–1 (4–2 pen.)	(Kanagawa Prefecture)	Mutsuura FC
2005	Sagawa Computer Systems	(Tokyo)	4–0	(Shizuoka Prefecture)	Yokouchi FC
2006	FC Kakogawa	(Hyōgo Prefecture)	3–1	(Ōita Prefecture)	Hoyo Atletico Elan
2007	FC Ganju Iwate	(Iwate Prefecture)	6–0	(Kanagawa Prefecture)	Mutsuura FC
2008	SC Sagamihara	(Kanagawa Prefecture)	2–0	(Aichi Prefecture)	Aichi FC
2009	FC Ganju Iwate	(Iwate Prefecture)	1–1 (12–11)	(Ōita Prefecture)	Hoyo Atletico Elan
2010	Unsommet Iwate Hachimantai	(Iwate Prefecture)	2–0	(Gifu Prefecture)	FC Kawasaki
2011	Vonds Ichihara	(Chiba Prefecture)	4–2 (a.e.t.)	(Aichi Prefecture)	Nagoya SC
2012	OFC	(Gunma Prefecture)	5–1	(Hokkaido)	Hokusyukai FC Iwamizawa
2013	Tatsuno FC	(Hyōgo Prefecture)	1–0	(Nagano Prefecture)	YS Estrela
2014	Thespa Kusatsu Challenge	(Gunma Prefecture)	2–0	(Osaka Prefecture)	Kandai Club 2010
2015	Kandai Club 2010	(Osaka Prefecture)	1–0	(Nagano Prefecture)	Artista Grande
2016	Iwaki FC	(Fukushima Prefecture)	9–0	(Osaka Prefecture)	Route 11 FC
2017	Iwaki FC	(Fukushima Prefecture)	5–1	(Aichi Prefecture)	AS Kariya
2018	Panasonic Okayama	(Okayama Prefecture)	2–1	(Saitama Prefecture)	Aventura Kawaguchi
2019	FC Awajishima	(Hyōgo Prefecture)	3–1	(Ibaraki Prefecture)	FC Koga
2020	Narashino City FC	(Chiba Prefecture)	2–1	(Ibaraki Prefecture)	Kashima Sawayaka FC
2021	FC Lazo	(Osaka Prefecture)	2–1 (a.e.t.)	(Chiba Prefecture)	Narashino City FC
2022	OK FC	(Osaka Prefecture)	5–0	(Kōchi Prefecture)	FC Kuroshio 84
2023	E-Wing Izumo	(Shimane Prefecture)	1–0	(Hyōgo Prefecture)	FC MJO
2024	Fukugawa City FC	(Ibaraki Prefecture)	1-0	(Ōita Prefecture)	FC Nakatsu
2025	Osaka City FC	(Osaka Prefecture)	2-1	(Shiga Prefecture)	Viabenten Shiga

== See also ==
- Japanese Super Cup
- Emperor's Cup
- J.League Cup
- Japanese Regional Leagues
- All Japan Senior Football Championship
