= Shunji Masuda =

Japanese footballer

Personal information
- Date of birth: 13 August 1998 (age 28)
- Place of birth: Osaka, Japan
- Height: 1.72 m (5 ft 8 in)
- Position: Midfielder

Team information
- Current team: Nara Club
- Number: 30

Youth career
- –2013: Leo SC
- 2014–2016: Tokai Univ. Shizuoka Shoyo High School

College career
Years	Team	Apps	(Gls)
2017–2020	Kindai University		

Senior career*
Years	Team	Apps	(Gls)
2021–2023	Iwate Grulla Morioka	46	(1)
2023	→ SC Sagamihara (loan)	16	(4)
2024–2026	FC Osaka	63	(7)
2026–	Nara Club	2	(0)
- * Club domestic league appearances and goals as of 25 August 2026

Shunji Masuda (増田 隼司, Masuda Shunji; born 13 August 1998) is a Japanese footballer currently playing as a midfielder for Nara Club.\
