= Asuka FC =

Association football club in Japan

Asuka FC 飛鳥FC
- Full name: Asuka Football Club
- Founded: 2003; 23 years ago as Porvenir Kashihara
- Stadium: Nara Prefectural Kashihira Park Athletics Stadium; Kashihara, Japan
- Capacity: 3,000
- Owner(s): Asuka FC Co., Ltd.
- Chairman: Tatsuo Fukunishi
- Manager: Naohiko Minobe
- League: Kansai Soccer League Division 1
- 2025: JFL, 16th of 16 (relegated)
- Website: asukafc.jp
Home colours	Away colours

Asuka Football Club (飛鳥フットボールクラブ, Asuka Futtobōru Kurabu), commonly known as Asuka FC (飛鳥FC, Asuka Efushi) is a semi-professional football club based in Kashihara, Nara Prefecture, Japan. The team set to play in Kansai Soccer League Division 1 from 2026–27, the fifth tier of Japanese football after relegation from Japan Football League in 2025. The club was founded on 6 December 2003 and has undergone several name changes throughout its history, including Porvenir Kashihara and from Porvenir Asuka in 2022.

== History ==
Asuka FC has steadily progressed through the Japanese football league system. The club has participated in regional leagues, notably the Kansai Soccer League, which is part of the Japanese Regional Leagues and represents the fifth tier of Japanese football.

In the 2024 season, Asuka FC clinched the Kansai Soccer League Division 1 title, marking a significant achievement in the club's history. This victory earned them promotion to the Japan Football League (JFL), the fourth tier of Japanese football, for the 2025 season.

=== Early foundations ===
Kashihara FC was founded in 1979, followed by Shirakashi FC in 1984, and Unebi FC in 1993. These three clubs were established within the Nara Prefecture and participated in local leagues, developing their reputation within the regional football scene.

Porvenir Kashihara was established in 2003 from the merger of three local teams in Kashihara, those being Kashihara FC, Shirakashi FC, and Unebi FC. Alongside this merger, the Porvenir Kashihara Sports Club, a non-profit organization, was established as the operating entity. That same year, the team won the Nara Football League Division 1 championship, earning the right to compete in the Kansai Soccer League finals. Unfortunately, they finished 4th in the B Block of the Kansai League Finals Qualifying Tournament, which meant remaining in the Nara League Division 1.

=== 2006–2010 ===
In 2006, the club secured 2nd place in the Nara League Division 1 and advanced to the Kansai League Finals. However, their journey ended after finishing 3rd in the C Block of the Kansai League Finals Qualifying Tournament.

The following year, in 2007, the team won the Nara League Division 1 and advanced once again to the Kansai League Finals. Unfortunately, their campaign concluded with a 3rd place finish in the D Block of the Kansai League Finals Qualifying Tournament.

In 2010, the club achieved 2nd place in the Nara League Division 1 and advanced to the Kansai League Finals. They finished second in Group D of the Kansai League Finals Qualifying Tournament, remaining in the Nara League Division 1. Notably, this was the team's first appearance in the All Japan Club Teams Football Tournament. That year also marked the team's ambition to aim for membership in the J.League.

=== 2017–2019 ===
In 2017, the team made its second appearance in the All Japan Club Teams Football Tournament and won the Nara Football League Division 1 for the second time. They triumphed in the Kansai League Finals, earning promotion to the Kansai Soccer League Division 2.

The top team’s name was officially changed to Porvenir Asuka in 2018. A year later, in 2019, they finished as runners-up in the Kansai League Division 2 and secured promotion to the Kansai League Division 1.

=== 2021–2022 ===
In 2021, the club appointed Naohiko Minobe, who had previously managed Kyoto and other teams, as the new manager. That year, the club won the 26th Nara Football Championship and made its first appearance in the Emperor's Cup, losing in the first round against FC Osaka.

On 14 February 2022, the top team’s name was changed to Asuka FC to reflect its goal of expanding its operations beyond Kashihara City to the central and southern parts of Nara Prefecture.

=== 2023–2024 ===
In 2023, the club made its first appearance in the All Japan Senior Football Championship. That same year, the operating corporation was restructured, transitioning from the nonprofit organisation Porvenir Kashihara Sports Club to Asuka FC Co., Ltd., which was established in February 2023.

The 2024 season was a groundbreaking year for Asuka FC. They won the Kansai League Division 1 for the first time, were victorious in the Japanese Regional Football Champions League, and earned promotion to the Japan Football League (JFL). They also won the KSL Cup, achieving a triple crown in a single season.

=== 2025 ===
On 15 November 2025, Asuka FC secure relegation from JFL to Kansai Soccer League after draw against Maruyasu Okazaki 1–1 on Matchweek 29 and ended one year in fourth tier due to worst performance in the league.

== Stadium ==
Asuka FC plays its home matches at the Nara Prefectural Kashihira Park Athletics Stadium (奈良県立橿原公苑陸上競技場), located in Kashihara, Nara. The stadium has a seating capacity of 3,000 spectators.

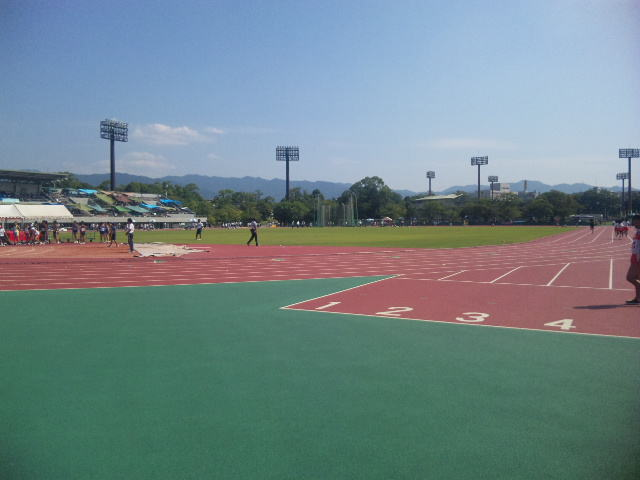
A view from the athletics track of the stadium grounds.

== Team colours ==
The official team colour of Asuka FC is enji, a traditional Japanese colour resembling dark red or burgundy.

== League & cup record ==
Champions	Runners-up	Third place	Promoted	Relegated

League												J. League Cup	Emperor's Cup
Season	Div.	Pos.	P	W	D	L	F	A	GD	Pts	Attendance/G	J. League Cup	Emperor's Cup
Porvenir Kashihara
2003	Nara Football; League (Division 1)	1st	10							26		Not eligible	Lost in the prefectural qualifying round
2004	Nara Football; League (Division 1)	4th	10							16		Not eligible	Lost in the prefectural qualifying round
2005	Nara Football; League (Division 1)	4th	11							18		Not eligible	Lost in the prefectural qualifying round
2006	Nara Football; League (Division 1)	2nd	10	7	2	1	35	15	20	23		Not eligible	Lost in the prefectural qualifying round
2007	Nara Football; League (Division 1)	1st	11	8	1	2	31	16	15	25		Not eligible	Lost in the prefectural qualifying round
2008	Nara Football; League (Division 1)	3rd	11	8	1	2	34	14	20	25		Not eligible	Lost in the prefectural qualifying round
2009	Nara Football; League (Division 1)	5th	11	6	1	4	26	18	8	19		Not eligible	Lost in the prefectural qualifying round
2010	Nara Football; League (Division 1)	2nd	11	7	4	0	39	10	29	25		Not eligible	Lost in the prefectural qualifying round
2011	Nara Football; League (Division 1)	5th	11	6	3	2	26	17	9	21		Not eligible	Lost in the prefectural qualifying round
2012	Nara Football; League (Division 1)	3rd	11	7	1	3	31	22	9	22		Not eligible	Lost in the prefectural qualifying round
2013	Nara Football; League (Division 1)	9th	11	2	3	6	19	26	-7	9		Not eligible	Lost in the prefectural qualifying round
2014	Nara Football; League (Division 1)	10th	11	3	3	5	10	24	-14	12		Not eligible	Lost in the prefectural qualifying round
2015	Nara Football; League (Division 1)	8th	11	2	4	5	17	25	-8	10		Not eligible	Lost in the prefectural qualifying round
2016	Nara Football; League (Division 1)	5th	9	4	2	3	16	16	0	14		Not eligible	Lost in the prefectural qualifying round
2017	Nara Football; League (Division 1)	1st	9	7	2	0	29	5	24	23		Not eligible	Lost in the prefectural qualifying round
Porvenir Asuka
2018	Kansai Soccer League (Division 2)	3rd	14	7	4	3	37	15	22	25		Not eligible	Lost in the prefectural qualifying round
2019	Kansai Soccer League (Division 2)	2nd	14	9	2	3	34	12	22	29		Not eligible	Lost in the prefectural qualifying round
2020	Kansai Soccer League (Division 1)	7th	7	1	2	4	6	8	-2	5		Not eligible	Lost in the prefectural qualifying round
2021	Kansai Soccer League (Division 1)	3rd	14	8	3	3	22	11	11	27		Not eligible	1st round
Asuka FC
2022	Kansai Soccer League (Division 1)	2nd	14	9	0	5	16	11	5	27		Not eligible	Lost in the prefectural qualifying round
2023	Kansai Soccer League (Division 1)	5th	14	5	1	8	16	19	-3	16		Not eligible	Lost in the prefectural qualifying round
2024	Kansai Soccer League (Division 1)	1st	14	8	4	2	19	9	10	28		Not eligible	Lost in the prefectural qualifying round
2025	JFL	16th	30	4	12	14	22	33	-11	24	422	Not eligible	Did not qualify
2026–27	Kansai Soccer League (Division 1)	TBD	14									Not eligible	TBD

== Current squad ==
As of 17 March 2025.

Note: Flags indicate national team as defined under FIFA eligibility rules; some limited exceptions apply. Players may hold more than one non-FIFA nationality.

No.	Pos.	Nation	Player
1	GK	JPN	Sotaro Maruyama
2	DF	JPN	Kazuki Shinohara
3	DF	JPN	Shoki Ohara
4	DF	JPN	Tsuyoshi Fujitake
5	MF	JPN	Kanta Kokura
6	DF	JPN	Koki Okura
7	MF	JPN	Sasuga Kiyokawa
8	MF	JPN	Toshiki Onozawa
9	FW	JPN	Hiryu Okuda
10	MF	JPN	Yu Takiue
11	MF	JPN	Shoma Tanaka
13	DF	JPN	Kodai Uryu
14	DF	JPN	Kyohei Ozasa
15	MF	JPN	Kaoru Nonaka
16	DF	JPN	Ryosuke Oshima
17	MF	JPN	Ryosuke Iguchi

No.	Pos.	Nation	Player
18	MF	JPN	Ryo Ozaki
19	FW	JPN	Taisei Komoto
20	MF	JPN	Daia Kitada
21	DF	JPN	Tomoyasu Yoshida (on loan from Tegevajaro Miyazaki)
22	DF	JPN	Kazunari Ishida
23	MF	JPN	Tomoya Seki
24	DF	JPN	Ran Fujii
25	DF	THA	Peeranat Jantharawong
26	MF	JPN	Sho Horino
27	MF	JPN	Kota Sasaki
28	GK	JPN	Ryo Momoi
29	MF	JPN	Yusuke Umekita
31	GK	JPN	Shota Nakano
36	FW	JPN	Takato Nakai
41	GK	JPN	Shota Okayama

== Coaching staff ==
The coaching staff for 2025 season.

Position	Staff
Manager	(Japan) Naohiko Minobe
Assistant managers	(Japan) Hiroki Minobe (Japan) Shimuzu Katsuyuki
Goalkeeper coach	(Japan) Kazumasa Tsuchishi

== Honours ==
Asuka FC
Honour	No.	Years
Nara Prefectural Adult Soccer League Division 1	3	2003, 2007, 2017
Nara Prefectural Football Championship Emperor's Cup Prefectural Qualifiers	1	2021
Kansai Soccer League Division 1	1	2024
Japanese Regional Football Champions League	1	2024
KSL Cup	1	2024

== Managerial history ==
Manager	Nationality	Tenure	
Manager	Nationality	Start	Finish
Naruyuki Naitō	Japan	1 February 2020	31 January 2021
Naohiko Minobe	Japan	1 February 2021	Current
