= Tomoyasu Yoshida =

Japanese footballer (born 1997)

Personal information
- Date of birth: 24 September 1997 (age 29)
- Place of birth: Takasaki, Gunma, Japan
- Height: 1.72 m (5 ft 8 in)
- Position: Defender

Team information
- Current team: FC Basara Hyogo
- Number: 30

Youth career
- Takasaki FC Eagle
- Maebashi FC
- 2013–2015: Maebashi Ikuei High School

College career
Years	Team	Apps	(Gls)
2016–2019	Sanno Institute of Management		

Senior career*
Years	Team	Apps	(Gls)
2020–2021	Fukushima United	34	(1)
2021–2022	Montedio Yamagata	23	(0)
2022–2023	Tochigi SC	1	(0)
2024–2025	Tegevajaro Miyazaki	18	(1)
2025	→ Asuka FC (loan)	14	(0)
2026–	FC Basara Hyogo	0	(0)
- * Club domestic league appearances and goals as of 16:14, 31 December 2025 (UTC)

Tomoyasu Yoshida (吉田 朋恭, Yoshida Tomoyasu; born 24 September 1997) is a Japanese footballer currently playing as a defender for FC Basara Hyogo.

== Career statistics ==
=== Club ===
As of 28 March 2021.

Club	Season	League			National Cup		League Cup		Other		Total	
Club	Season	Division	Apps	Goals	Apps	Goals	Apps	Goals	Apps	Goals	Apps	Goals
Fukushima United	2020	J3 League	34	1	0	0	–		0	0	34	1
Fukushima United	2021	J3 League	0	0	0	0	–		0	0	0	0
Fukushima United	Total		34	1	0	0	0	0	0	0	34	1
Montedio Yamagata	2021	J2 League	0	0	0	0	–		0	0	0	0
Career total			34	1	0	0	0	0	0	0	34	1
