= AS Laranja Kyoto =

Japanese football club

AS Laranja Kyoto AS.ラランジャ京都
- Full name: AS Laranja Kyoto
- Founded: 1987; 39 years ago
- Stadium: Takebishi Stadium Kyoto and Nishikyōgoku Sub Athletic Stadium (Kyoto City, Kyoto)
- Capacity: 20,688 and 500
- League: Kansai Soccer League Div.2
- 2024: 1st of 8 (Champions)
- Website: aslaranja.jp
Home colours	Away colours

AS Laranja Kyoto (AS.ラランジャ京都, E Esu Raranja Kyoto) is a Japanese professional football club based in Kyoto City, Kyoto Prefecture. They play in the Kansai Soccer League Division 2, having been shifting between Division 1 and Division 2 on recent times. The club aims to join the Japan Football League, being only two promotions away from it. Laranja is also one of the few "European-style clubs" in Japan, as it currently have football teams for all age categories. It has branches on Kyoto, Kansai Science City, Toyokawa and Suita.

Since 2023, following Division 1 relegation, they play in the Division 2 of the Kansai Soccer League.

== Overview ==
In 1987, Taiichi Itagaki started coaching soccer at "Kikuhana Soccer Club" and founded Laranja's parent body. In 1991, the junior high school team "Kitayama FC" was established, in 1992 the elementary school teams "Rio Soccer Club" and "Yuyu Soccer School" were established, and in 1997, three clubs were established as "Laranja Sports Club". Taiichi Itagaki was appointed as the representative.

In 2000, the club was reorganised from a sports club to an academy as a place to "develop and educate young people with a global perspective", and the club's name was changed to "Academy of Sports, Laranja Kyoto (AS. Laranja Kyoto)". In addition, Kyoto University of Education Athletic Association Soccer Club Founded by alumni of Kyoto Shiyo Club, "AS. Laranja Kyoto Top Team" was launched. Shigemu Ueda was appointed as vice president.

In 2003, "AS. Laranja Toyokawa" was established in Toyokawa City, Aichi Prefecture, and in 2005, "Seikacho Soccer School" was established in Seika Town, Sagara District.

In 2006, Seika Town Soccer School was dissolved as "AS. Laranja Gakken City", and was active mainly in Kizu Town (currently Kizugawa City) in Sagara District. In addition, we set up an office in Joyo City and started a welfare business as "AS. Laranja de Laito" (De-Laito became independent in 2007 as a "specified non-profit organisation de Laito").

In 2023 the club won the 28th Kyoto Football Championship. They defeated Doshisha University in a penalty shootout after extra time, this qualified them for the 103rd Japan All Japan Football Championship JFA Emperor's Cup, where they were defeated by AC Nagano Parceiro.

== League & cup record ==
Champions	Runners-up	Third place	Promoted	Relegated

League											Emperor's Cup	Shakaijin Cup
Season	Division	Pos	P	W	D	L	F	A	GD	Pts	Emperor's Cup	Shakaijin Cup
2001	Kyoto Prefectural; League (Div. 1)	2nd	11							33	Did not qualify	
2002	Kyoto Prefectural; League (Div. 1)	1st	11	9	0	2	29	4	25	27	Did not qualify	
2003	Kansai Soccer League	6th	18	5	5	8	27	32	-5	27	Did not qualify	
2004	Kansai Soccer League	1st	20	16	2	2	52	15	37	51	Did not qualify	
2005	Kansai Soccer League; Div.1	5th	14	6	2	6	21	25	-4	20	Did not qualify	
2006	Kansai Soccer League; Div.1	5th	14	6	1	7	27	27	0	19	Did not qualify	
2007	Kansai Soccer League; Div.1	4th	14	6	2	6	19	31	-12	20	Did not qualify	Quarter-finals
2008	Kansai Soccer League; Div.1	5th	14	6	1	7	18	28	-10	19	Did not qualify	Round of 16
2009	Kansai Soccer League; Div.1	2nd	14	9	2	3	35	14	21	29	Did not qualify	Round of 32
2010	Kansai Soccer League; Div.1	5th	14	6	2	6	26	22	4	20	Did not qualify	Round of 16
2011	Kansai Soccer League; Div.1	6th	14	4	1	9	14	18	-4	13	Did not qualify	Did not play
2012	Kansai Soccer League; Div.1	6th	14	4	1	9	12	26	-14	13	Did not qualify	Did not play
2013	Kansai Soccer League; Div.1	7th	14	2	2	10	10	26	-16	8	Did not qualify	Did not play
2014	Kansai Soccer League Div.2	2nd	14	6	5	3	24	14	10	23	Did not qualify	Did not play
2015	Kansai Soccer League Div.1	7th	14	1	4	9	21	37	-16	7	Did not qualify	Did not play
2016	Kansai Soccer League Div.2	4th	14	7	3	4	28	19	9	24	Did not qualify	Round of 32
2017	Kansai Soccer League Div.2	2nd	14	7	4	3	24	20	4	22	Did not qualify	Did not play
2018	Kansai Soccer League Div.1	8th	14	1	1	12	9	37	-28	4	Did not qualify	Did not play
2019	Kansai Soccer League Div.2	1st	14	10	3	1	42	11	31	33	Did not qualify	Did not play
2020	Kansai Soccer League Div.1	2nd	7	4	1	2	14	9	5	13	Did not qualify	Was not held
2021	Kansai Soccer League Div.1	5th	14	4	3	7	22	29	-7	15	Did not qualify	Was not held
2022	Kansai Soccer League Div.1	7th	14	5	3	6	18	21	-3	18	Did not qualify	Round of 16
2023	Kansai Soccer League Div.2	3rd	14	7	3	4	34	21	13	24	1st round	Did not qualify
2024	Kansai Soccer League Div.2	1st	14	10	3	1	33	13	20	33	Did not qualify	
2025	Kansai Soccer League Div.1	4th	14	5	4	5	20	21	−1	19	Did not qualify	
2026	Kansai Soccer League Div.1	TBD	14									

Key

- Pos. = Position in league; P = Games played; W = Games won; D = Games drawn; L = Games lost; F = Goals for/scored; A = Goals against GD = Goal difference; Pts = Points

== Honours ==
AS Laranja Kyoto
Honour	No.	Years
Kyoto Football League Division 1	1	2002
Kansai Soccer League Division 1	1	2004
KSL Cup	1	2009
Kansai Soccer League Division 2	1	2019
Kyoto Prefectural Football Championship Emperor's Cup Kyoto Prefectural Qualifiers	1	2023

== Current squad ==
As of 28 August 2024.

Note: Flags indicate national team as defined under FIFA eligibility rules; some limited exceptions apply. Players may hold more than one non-FIFA nationality.

No.	Pos.	Nation	Player
1	GK	JPN	Masaya Ono
2	DF	JPN	Hayata Okuda
3	DF	JPN	Hiromu Koretake
4	MF	JPN	Hiroya Takahashi
5	DF	JPN	Yoshiyuki Tadamasa
6	MF	JPN	Shui Hirano
7	DF	JPN	Ryo Nakadome
8	MF	JPN	Takuya Yamaguchi
9	FW	JPN	Junya Isobe
10	MF	JPN	Wataru Ishibashi
11	FW	JPN	Naoki Nishiyama
13	DF	JPN	Kazuki Fukunaga
14	MF	JPN	Hiroki Yamanaka
15	FW	JPN	Yuma Kobayashi
16	DF	JPN	Soma Takemura
17	GK	JPN	Ayumu Miyamoto

No.	Pos.	Nation	Player
18	FW	JPN	Senri Okuda
19	MF	JPN	Shintaro Tagawa
20	MF	JPN	Kazuma Otsuki
21	MF	JPN	Toki Okuda
22	GK	JPN	Takeru Hashizume
23	MF	JPN	Takaya Yamada
24	DF	JPN	Hiraku Kakehi
27	FW	JPN	Hirotoshi Harada
28	MF	JPN	Kisumi Kimura
29	DF	JPN	Shoma Deguchi
30	MF	JPN	Tatsuya Hayashi
31	GK	JPN	Jumpei Okamoto
32	DF	JPN	Kenya Ono
35	MF	JPN	Takuma Kunita
36	DF	JPN	Hiroyiki Nishikawa

News of two players leaving the club in August 2024

== See also ==
- Japan Football Association (JFA)
