= Kansai Soccer League Cup =

- Organiser(s): Kansai Soccer League
- Founded: 2007; 18 years ago
- Region: Kansai, Japan
- Teams: 20
- Current champions: Asuka FC
- Most championships: Hannan University Soccer Club
- Website: kansaisl.jp
- 2025 KSL Cup

The KSL Cup, or Kansai Soccer League Cup, is a soccer tournament held every year between October and December, organised by the Kansai Soccer League.

== Format of the Competition ==
The KSL Cup is a football tournament involving clubs from the Kansai Soccer League (Divisions 1 and 2). Initially, all 16 clubs are divided into four groups of four teams each for a group-stage round-robin phase. The top two clubs from each group (eight in total) advance to a knockout stage that continues through to the final. In some years, however, the tournament skips the group stage and is held entirely in a single-elimination format from the first round.

The competition occasionally allows for matchups between Division 1 and Division 2 teams, offering a unique experience different from the regular league format. Prize money is awarded to the top three teams: ¥300,000 to the champion, ¥200,000 to the runner-up, and ¥100,000 to the third-place team.

=== The KSL Island Shield of Awaji ===
From 2013, the KSL Cup winner played a special match called the KSL Island Shield of Awaji against the Kansai Soccer League Division 1 champion. However, due to scheduling conflicts with other tournaments, such as Emperor's Cup prefectural qualifiers, this event has not been held since 2017.

=== Changes Due to COVID-19 ===
The tournament was suspended from 2020 to 2022 due to the COVID-19 pandemic. It resumed in 2023 with an expanded format that included youth teams from the Kansai Club Youth Soccer Federation, such as J.League academy sides and town club youth teams. The tournament increased to 20 teams, with 16 league clubs divided into four groups for a round-robin phase. The four group winners and the two best-performing runners-up (six teams) advanced to the final stage, along with two youth teams recommended by the Kansai Club Youth Soccer Federation. These eight teams then competed in a knockout format, including a third-place playoff. With the new format, the tournament was officially titled The KSL Ast Enji Cup, sponsored by Ast Enji Co., for both the 2023 and 2024 seasons.

== Tournament Results ==
Edition	Year	Champion	Score	Runner-up	Third place	Score	Fourth place	Reference
1	2007	Hannan University Soccer Club	5–0	Sanyo Electric Sumoto	FC Mi-O Biwako Kusatsu	5–1	Kyoto Shiko SC	
2	2008	FC Kyoto BAMB1993	1–0	Banditonce Kakogawa	Shiga FC	3–1	Kobe FC1970	
3	2009 (Note: The tournament was held entirely in a knockout format this year.)	AS Laranja Kyoto	0–0 (Pen. 6–5)	Ain Food	Hannan University Soccer Club	2–2 (Pen. 9–8)	Sanyo Electric Sumoto	
4	2010	Banditonce Kakogawa	3–2	Diablossa Takada FC	Ain Food	2–0	Amitie SC	
5	2011	Ain Food	1–0	Amitie SC	Hannan University Soccer Club	2–2 (Pen. 3–1)	Nara Club	
6	2012	Nara Club	7–1	Reilac Shiga FC	BIWAKO S.C. HIRA	1–0	Hannan University Soccer Club	
7	2013	Hannan University Soccer Club	2–1	Nara Club	Arterivo Wakayama	2–0	Amitie SC	
8	2014	Nara Club	1–0	Banditonce Kakogawa	FC Osaka	4–3	Reilac Shiga FC	
9	2015	Kandaidai FC2008	2–1	AS Laranja Kyoto	Hannan University Soccer Club	3–2	Banditonce Kakogawa	
10	2016	Hannan University Soccer Club	1–1 (Pen. 4–3)	AS Laranja Kyoto	Reilac Shiga FC	0–0 (Pen. 5–4)	Ain Food	
11	2017	Amitie Kyoto SC	3–1	Hannan University Soccer Club	Kandaidai FC2008	0–0 (Pen. 9–8)	AS Laranja Kyoto	
12	2018	Kyoto Shiko Club	0–0 (Pen. 5–4)	Amitie SC	Banditonce Kakogawa	3–0	FC EASY02	
13	2019	Amitie SC	2–1	Arterivo Wakayama	Porvenir Asuka	2–1	Hannan University Soccer Club	
14	2023	Kandaidai FC2008	2–2 (Pen. 5–4)	Cento Cuore Harima FC	Reilac Shiga FC	2–1	Amitie SC	
15	2024	Asuka FC	1–0	Kandaidai FC2008	Arterivo Wakayama	2–1	FC.AWJ	
