= Rohto Field Nara =

FIFA Pokémon Cup Japan 1999 L.R. Vicenza VS Santos

Kōnoike Athletic Stadium
- 鴻ノ池 (Kōnoike)
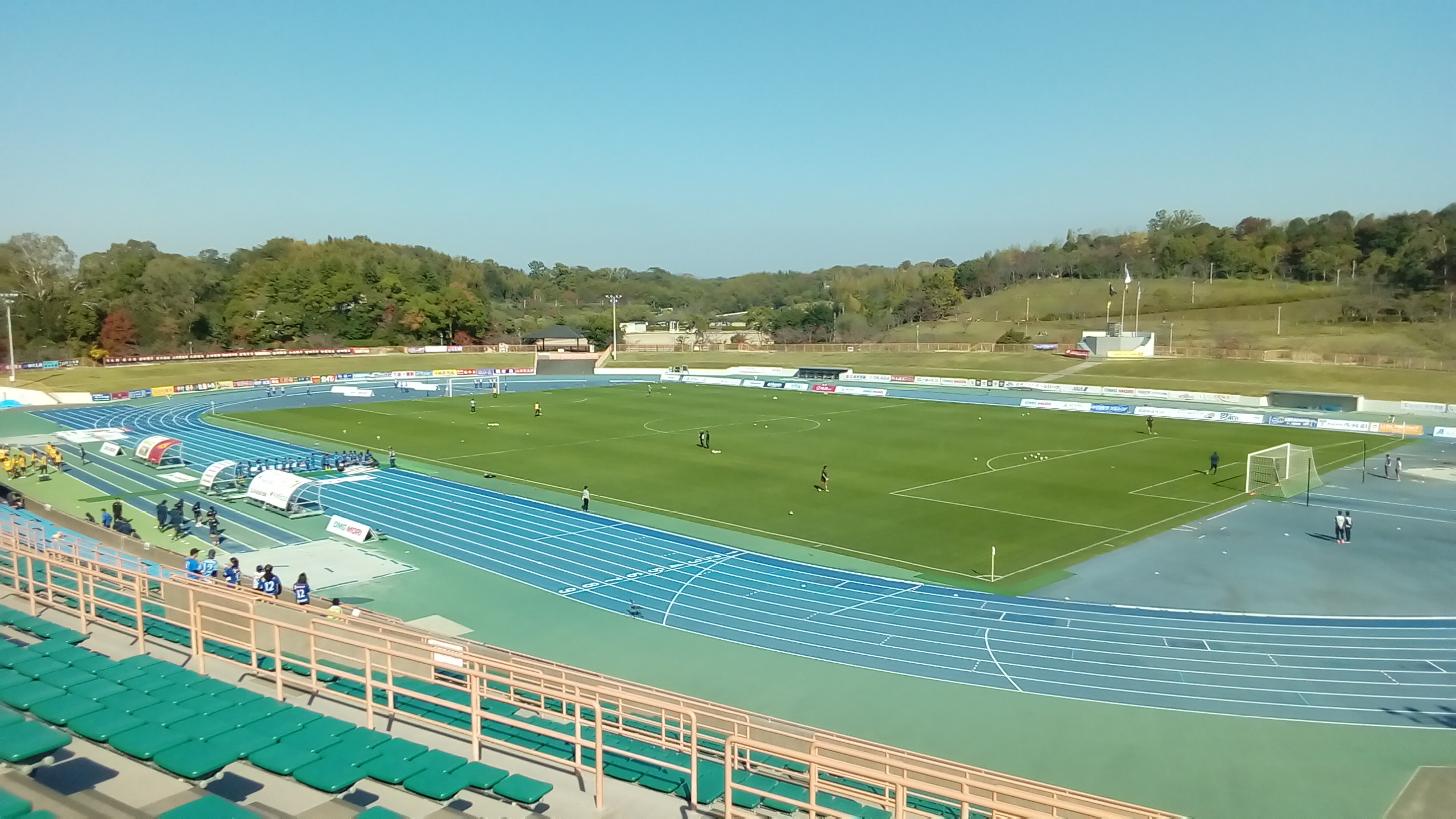
- Interactive map of Kōnoike Athletic Stadium
- Former names: Naraden Field
- Location: 5-1, Hōrensahoyama-chō 4-chōme, Nara, Japan
- Coordinates: 34°41′54.63″N 135°49′45.1″E
- Owner: Nara City
- Operator: Nara City
- Capacity: 30,600
- Surface: Grass

Construction
- Opened: 31 March 1983
- Renovated: 2009

Tenant
- Nara Club

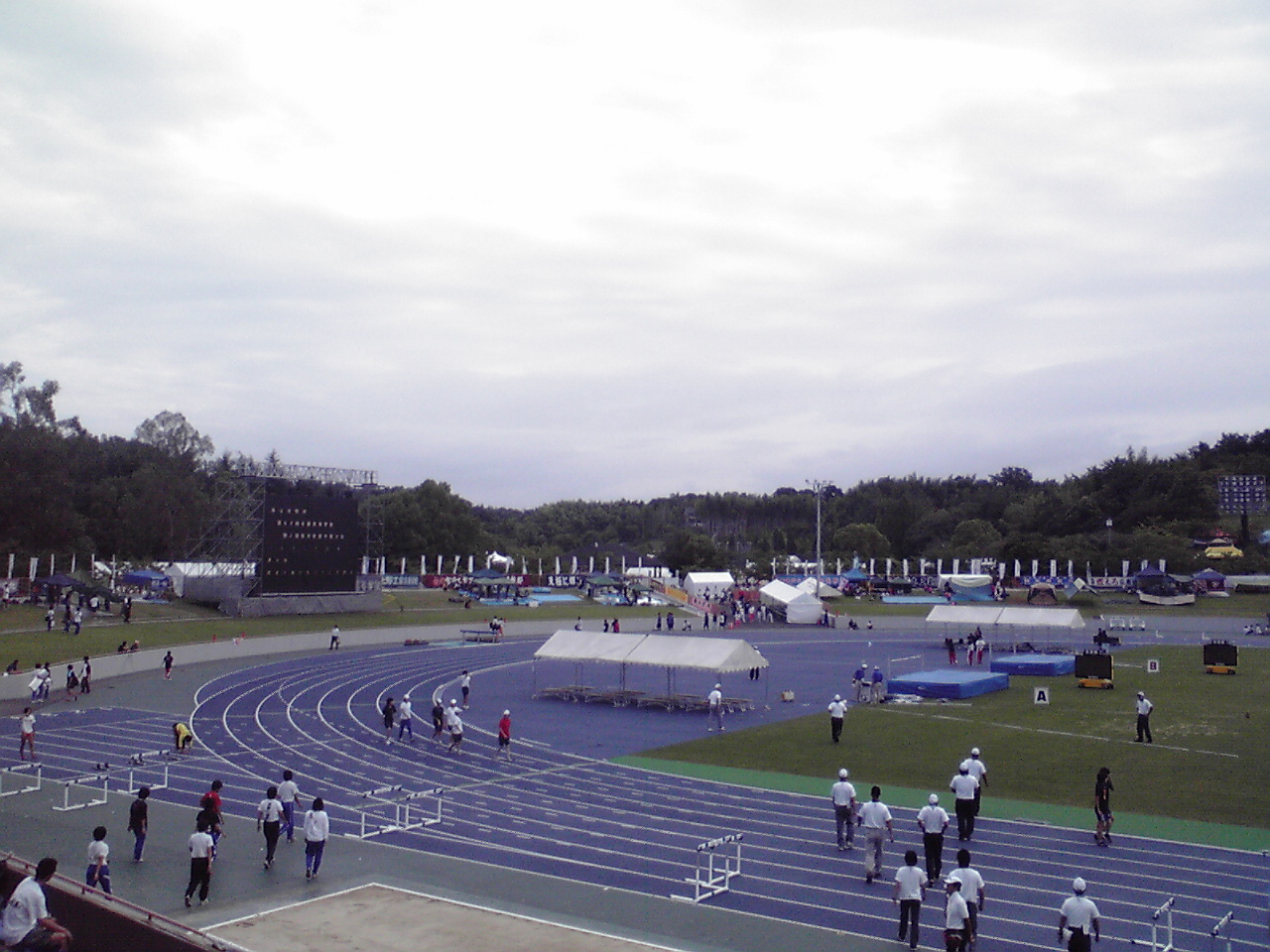
Inside of Stadium

Kōnoike Athletic Stadium (奈良市鴻ノ池陸上競技場, Narashi Kōnoike Rikujō-kyōgijō), a.k.a. Rohto Field Nara (ロートフィールド奈良, Rōtofīrudo Nara) due to sponsorship reasons, is a multi-purpose stadium in Nara, capital of Nara Prefecture, Japan. It is currently used mostly for football matches. The stadium holds 30,600 people with a seating capacity of 5.600. It is currently the home home of J.League club, Nara Club.

== History ==
Kōnoike Athletic Stadium officially opened on 31 March 1983. The stadium was renovated in 2009.

Nara Club hosted its first J3 League match against Matsumoto Yamaga on 5 March 2023.

== Events ==
- The 39th National Sports Festival of Japan autumn (a.k.a. わかくさ国体 (Wakakusa Kokutai)), Main venue in 1984.
- The Inter-highschool championships 2009, Main venue in 2009.
