= FC Ganju Iwate =

Japanese football club

FC Ganju Iwate FCガンジュ岩手
- Full name: FC Ganju Iwate
- Nickname: Ganju
- Founded: 2006
- Ground: Iwate Morioka Stadium
- Capacity: 30,000
- Chairman: Kentaro Ihara
- Manager: Tetsuya Nakanishi
- League: Tohoku Soccer League
- 2024: 5th of 10
- Website: fc-ganju.com
Home colours	Away colours

FC Ganju Iwate (FCガンジュ岩手, FC Ganju Iwate) is a football (soccer) club based in Hachimantai, a city of Iwate Prefecture in Japan. They play in the Tohoku Soccer League, which is part of Japanese Regional Leagues. The name of the club refers to Mount Iwate, symbol of their prefecture due to this volcano and also present on the club's logo.

== History ==
Founded in 2006, the club was a separated entity from Grulla Morioka (still in the Iwate Prefecture, but in Morioka). Shinichi Muto was fundamental to start club's history with the proper amount of experience and he was hired as player-manager for 2006 and 2007. The creation of another club in the Prefecture - Unsommet Iwate Hachimantai - didn't stop FC Ganju Iwate from climbing Japanese football's pyramid: they won several promotion in Iwate Prefectural Football, even going unbeaten for whole four seasons.

Unfortunately, then bigger clubs - like Grulla, ReinMeer Aomori FC and Vanraure Hachinohe - risked to block their growth. After these clubs went up to Japan Football League, FC Ganju Iwate won the Tohoku Soccer League in 2014 and 2015. Still, the club wasn't able to reach JFL because they didn't perform in 2014 and 2015 Japanese Regional Football League Competition, being eliminated in the group stage. They featured just once in Emperor's Cup, losing against Saitama SC in the first round of 2007 edition.

As for 2017 season, their aim remains to reach Japan Football League.

== League record ==
Champions	Runners-up	Third place	Promoted	Relegated

League												Emperor's Cup	Shakaijin Cup
Season	Division	Tier	Pos.	P	W	D	L	F	A	GD	Pts	Emperor's Cup	Shakaijin Cup
2007	Iwate Prefecture (Div. 4)	9	1st	10	10	0	0	130	0	130	30	1st round	
2008	Iwate Prefecture (Div. 3)	8	1st	10	10	0	0	100	1	99	30	Did not qualify	
2009	Iwate Prefecture (Div. 2)	7	1st	10	9	1	0	96	3	93	28	Did not qualify	
2010	Iwate Prefecture (Div. 1)	6	1st	10	10	0	0	68	2	66	30	Did not qualify	
2011	Tohoku Soccer League (Div. 2)	5	2nd	10	9	0	1	51	5	46	27	Did not qualify	
2012	Tohoku Soccer League (Div. 2, North)	5	1st	14	13	0	1	88	13	75	39	Did not qualify	
2013	Tohoku Soccer League (Div. 1)	5	3rd	18	13	1	4	67	17	50	40	Did not qualify	
2014	Tohoku Soccer League (Div. 1)	5	1st	18	16	2	0	129	5	124	50	Did not qualify	
2015	Tohoku Soccer League (Div. 1)	5	1st	18	15	2	1	107	11	96	47	Did not qualify	
2016	Tohoku Soccer League (Div. 1)	5	3rd	18	9	5	4	48	31	17	32	Did not qualify	
2017	Tohoku Soccer League (Div. 1)	5	8th	18	5	0	13	31	58	-27	15	Did not participate in the regional qualifiers	
2018	Tohoku Soccer League (Div. 1)	5	2nd	18	11	3	4	71	29	42	36	Did not qualify	
2019	Tohoku Soccer League (Div. 1)	5	6th	18	6	3	9	42	56	-14	21	Did not qualify	
2020	Tohoku Soccer League (Div. 1)	5	4th	9	4	1	4	16	17	-1	13	Did not qualify	
2021	Tohoku Soccer League (Div. 1)	5	3rd	8	4	1	3	10	7	3	13	Did not qualify	
2022	Tohoku Soccer League (Div. 1)	5	7th	16	8	3	5	32	17	15	27	Did not qualify	
2023	Tohoku Soccer League (Div. 1)	5	7th	18	7	3	8	26	34	-8	24	Did not qualify	
2024	Tohoku Soccer League (Div. 1)	5	5th	18	7	4	7	40	39	1	25	Did not qualify	
2025	Tohoku Soccer League (Div. 1)	5	6th	18	6	4	8	24	27	-3	22	Did not qualify	
2026	Tohoku Soccer League (Div. 1)	5	TBD	18									

Key

- Pos. = Position in league; P = Games played; W = Games won; D = Games drawn; L = Games lost; Pts = Points gained

== Honours ==
FC Ganju Iwate honours
Honour	No.	Years
Iwate Prefecture (Div. 4)	1	2007
Iwate Prefectural Football Championship Emperor's Cup Iwate Prefectural Qualifiers	1	2007
Iwate Prefecture (Div. 3)	1	2008
Iwate Prefecture (Div. 2)	1	2009
Iwate Prefecture (Div. 1)	1	2010
Tohoku Soccer League (Div. 2, North)	1	2012
Tohoku Soccer League	2	2014, 2015

== Current squad ==
As of 30 April 2024.

Note: Flags indicate national team as defined under FIFA eligibility rules; some limited exceptions apply. Players may hold more than one non-FIFA nationality.

No.	Pos.	Nation	Player
2	DF	JPN	Tomoya Terada
3	DF	JPN	Junya Hashimoto
4	DF	JPN	Tadayoshi Hiranaka
5	DF	JPN	Junya Yamashita
7	MF	JPN	Tetsuya Nakanishi
8	FW	JPN	Yamato Kadowaki
9	MF	JPN	Yu Mita
10	FW	JPN	Shinma Kumagai

No.	Pos.	Nation	Player
14	MF	JPN	Daiji Matoba
16	MF	JPN	Yuya Yamamoto
17	GK	JPN	Shinnosuke Fujiwara
18	FW	JPN	Koya Higashi
19	MF	JPN	Takahiro Yamamoto
25	FW	JPN	Kaito Katsu
32	FW	JPN	Monji Kumagai
50	DF	JPN	Atsushi Wada
