= Cento Cuore Harima FC =

Japanese football club

Cento Cuore Harima チェント・クオーレ・ハリマ
- Founded: 1976; 50 years ago
- Stadium: Kakogawa Athletic Stadium; Miki Athletic Stadium; Hiokayama Park Ground
- Capacity: 15,275 (Kakogawa); 20,000 (Miki); 1,000 (Hiokayama)
- Chairman: Yasuharu Otsuka
- Manager: Yuya Sano
- League: Kansai Soccer League
- 2024: 2nd of 8
- Website: https://www.centocuore.com/
Home colours	Away colours

Cento Cuore Harima (チェント・クオーレ・ハリマ, Chento Kuōre HARIMA) is a football (soccer) club based in Kakogawa, which is located in Hyōgo Prefecture in Japan. They play in the Kansai Soccer League, which is part of Japanese Regional Leagues.

== History ==
Founded as Hyogo Teachers' Soccer Club in 1976, the following year it was renamed the Hyogo Teachers' Kicking Club. They renamed the club in advance of the 1988 season to Central SC Kobe.

In 2002 the club renamed to Central Kobe, dropping the SC. In 2005, the club rebranded, and was renamed Banditonce Kobe, from the mix of Spanish words Banditos (Spanish for "bandits") and Once (Spanish for "eleven"). In 2008 the club moved from Kobe to the city of Kakogawa in Hyōgo prefecture. Konigs-Krone had been a sponsor for the team, but they withdrew from that deal.

They have played 48 of 49 seasons the top division of Kansai Soccer League, getting relegated only once which was in 1999. They made and immediate return to the top division by winning the Hyogo division 1 title in 2000. They have won Kansai division one title on six occasions and in 2007 they finished fourth in Regional Leagues, just failing to qualify for the Japan Football League. They also featured nine times in Emperor's Cup, reaching the 4th round in 2006, eventually getting knocked out by FC Tokyo.

In 2020 the club rebranded again and are now called Cento Cuore Harima. "Cento Cuore" is an Italian word that means "100" (a symbol of "lot" and is also derived from the J.League Centennial Initiative) and Cuore meaning "heart". "The hearts of many people gather together and become a club that represents the Hyogo-Harima area" and "Aiming to realize the philosophy of the J.League 100-year concept, aiming to be a community-based sports club involving people of multiple generations"

== League record ==
Champions	Runners-up	Third place	Promoted	Relegated

League											Emperor's Cup	Shakaijin Cup
Season	League	Pos	P	W	D	L	F	A	GD	Pts	Emperor's Cup	Shakaijin Cup
Banditonce Kobe
2005	Kansai Soccer; League (Div. 1)	1st	14	10	3	1	28	11	17	33	2nd round	
2006	Kansai Soccer; League (Div. 1)	1st	14	11	2	1	35	9	26	35	4th round	
2007	Kansai Soccer; League (Div. 1)	1st	14	13	0	1	55	8	47	39	3rd round	
Banditonce Kakogawa
2008	Kansai Soccer; League (Div. 1)	1st	14	13	1	0	53	12	41	40	1st round	
2009	Kansai Soccer; League (Div. 1)	4th	14	7	0	7	22	22	0	21	Did not qualify	
2010	Kansai Soccer; League (Div. 1)	6th	14	5	3	6	22	16	6	18	Did not qualify	
2011	Kansai Soccer; League (Div. 1)	2nd	14	10	2	2	20	14	6	32	Did not qualify	
2012	Kansai Soccer; League (Div. 1)	4th	14	4	7	3	21	17	4	19	Did not qualify	
2013	Kansai Soccer; League (Div. 1)	4th	14	7	4	3	23	13	10	25	Did not qualify	
2014	Kansai Soccer; League (Div. 1)	4th	14	6	4	4	15	16	-1	22	Did not qualify	
2015	Kansai Soccer; League (Div. 1)	2nd	14	8	4	2	24	10	14	28	Did not qualify	
2016	Kansai Soccer; League (Div. 1)	5th	14	4	7	3	15	16	-1	19	1st round	
2017	Kansai Soccer; League (Div. 1)	6th	14	5	3	6	12	16	-4	18	2nd round	
2018	Kansai Soccer; League (Div. 1)	1st	14	10	3	1	27	9	18	33	Did not qualify	
2019	Kansai Soccer; League (Div. 1)	5th	14	6	2	6	22	23	-1	20	Did not qualify	
Cento Cuore Harima
2020	Kansai Soccer; League (Div. 1)	3rd	7	4	1	2	11	6	5	13	1st round	
2021	Kansai Soccer; League (Div. 1)	4th	14	8	2	4	29	15	14	26	Did not qualify	
2022	Kansai Soccer; League (Div. 1)	3rd	14	6	6	2	12	10	2	24	1st round	
2023	Kansai Soccer; League (Div. 1)	3rd	14	4	7	3	16	15	1	19	2nd round	
2024	Kansai Soccer; League (Div. 1)	2nd	14	6	6	2	23	13	10	24	Did not qualify	
2025	Kansai Soccer; League (Div. 1)	3rd	14	4	8	2	18	11	7	20	Did not qualify	
2026	Kansai Soccer; League (Div. 1)	TBD	14									

Key

- Pos. = Position in league; P = Games played; W = Games won; D = Games drawn; L = Games lost; F = Goals for; A = Goals against; GD = Goals difference; Pts = Points gained

== Honours ==
Cento Cuore Harima FC honours
Honour	No.	Years
Kansai Soccer League	6	1982, 2005, 2006, 2007, 2008, 2018
Hyogo Adult Football League Division 1	1	2000
Hyogo Football Championship	9	2004, 2005, 2006, 2007, 2008, 2016, 2017, 2020, 2022
KSL Cup	1	2010

== Current squad ==
As of 23 August 2023.

Note: Flags indicate national team as defined under FIFA eligibility rules; some limited exceptions apply. Players may hold more than one non-FIFA nationality.

No.	Pos.	Nation	Player
1	GK	JPN	Koki Ota
2	DF	JPN	Shota Suemasa
3	MF	JPN	Seiya Tanaka
4	MF	JPN	Yuito Yoshinaga
5	DF	JPN	Naota Yamaguchi
6	MF	JPN	Hayato Kubota
7	DF	JPN	Rei Enoki
8	MF	JPN	Yuya Sano
9	FW	JPN	Yuto Hotta
10	MF	JPN	Shumpei Mori
11	FW	JPN	Yoshihito Fujita
13	DF	JPN	Ryota Ukai
14	MF	JPN	Ren Takase
15	MF	JPN	Yusei Shimomura
16	MF	JPN	Kyotaro Murakami
17	FW	JPN	Seiya Hiratani
18	FW	JPN	Yuki Matsumoto

No.	Pos.	Nation	Player
19	MF	JPN	Reo Yamaryo
20	DF	JPN	Naoya Nakajo
21	MF	JPN	Toi Takayama
22	MF	JPN	Kazuhiro Fushiki
23	DF	JPN	Shunsuke Komatsu
24	MF	JPN	Naotaka Nobe
25	MF	JPN	Masato Miyamoto
26	DF	JPN	Misaki Uemura
27	DF	JPN	Shuhei Doen
28	DF	JPN	Kaito Izuishi
29	FW	JPN	Daiya Okamoto
30	MF	JPN	Shunnosuke Oishi
31	GK	JPN	Tadeo Ishikawa
33	DF	JPN	Yuya Takami
37	MF	JPN	Kaisho Hirane
38	GK	JPN	Yuki Ishihara
39	FW	JPN	Fumiya Matsumoto
