= Kansai Soccer League =

- Founded: 1966; 60 years ago
- Country: Japan
- Confederation: AFC
- Divisions: 2
- Number of clubs: Div 1: 8 Div 2: 8
- Level on pyramid: 5–6
- Promotion to: Japan Football League
- Relegation to: Prefectural Leagues
- Domestic cup(s): Emperor's Cup; Shakaijin Cup
- League cup: Kansai Soccer League Cup
- Current champions: Div 1: Arterivo Wakayama; Div 2: Ococias Kyoto (2025)
- Most championships: NTT West Kyoto SC (8 titles)
- Website: kansaisl.jp
- Current: 2026 Japanese Regional Leagues

Kansai Soccer League (関西サッカーリーグ, Kansai Sakkā Rīgu) is the Japanese fifth tier of league football, which is part of the Japanese Regional Leagues. It covers most of the Kansai region, as well as the prefectures of Hyōgo, Kyōto, Nara, Osaka, Shiga and Wakayama. Mie, usually considered part of Kansai in non-football usage, but is allotted to the Tōkai Adult Soccer League.

== Overview ==
The Kansai Soccer League commenced in 1966 as the Kansai Adult Soccer League. The first tournament had eight clubs, these were: -

- Osaka Sportsman Club
- Kyoto Shiko Club
- Dainichi Nippon Cable
- NTT Kinki
- Fuji Steel Hirohata
- Wakayama Club
- Mitsubishi Heavy Industries Kobe
- Shiga Club

The tournament was played in a single division, until a second division commenced in 2005, this introduced promotion and relegation at this regional level. Team in the second tier get relegated to the provincial leagues. In 2005, the name was changed to "Kansai Soccer League" and scoreboards are required to be installed at every venue (if the stadium does not have this facility, the league will lend a portable scoreboard).

"SiMSEED" (formerly SiMS), which manages official records and posts information online, was jointly developed with NTT West Japan-Hyogo (formerly NTT Marketing Act Hyogo). Since 2012, the company commenced its official channel "KSLTV", which is now available on the KSLTV platform, where some of the matches are streamed live.

== KSL Cup ==
Since 2017, all clubs competing in both Division 1 and Division 2 of the Kansai Soccer League have been eligible to take part in the KSL Cup. Beginning in 2023, two youth sides from the Kansai Club Youth Soccer Federation were also granted entry into the competition.

The KSL Cup is a regional football tournament showcasing clubs from across Kansai. Ordinarily, 16 teams are split into four groups of four, each playing in a round-robin format. The top two teams from each group—eight in total—progress to a knockout stage, concluding with a final. However, in certain editions, the group stage is bypassed entirely, with the tournament held as a straight knockout competition from the first round.

The competition was put on hold between 2020 and 2022 due to the COVID-19 pandemic. Upon its return in 2023, the format was expanded to include 20 teams. The 16 league sides continued to form the core of the tournament, divided into groups as usual, while the top four teams from the group stage—alongside the two best runners-up—advanced to the final stage. They were joined by two additional youth teams selected by the Kansai Club Youth Soccer Federation, making up a final eight for the knockout rounds, which also featured a third-place play-off.

With the introduction of the revised structure, the tournament was rebranded as The KSL Ast Enji Cup, under the title sponsorship of Ast Enji Co., for both the 2023 and 2024 editions.

== 2026 clubs ==
=== Division 1 ===
#	Teams	Hometown	Notes
1	Arterivo Wakayama	Wakayama, Wakayama	
2	Asuka FC	Nara, Nara	
3	Basara Hyogo (ja)	Akashi, Hyōgo	
4	Cento Cuore Harima	Kakogawa, Hyōgo	
5	Laranja Kyoto	Kyoto, Kyoto	
6	Moriyama Samurai 2000 (ja)	Moriyama, Shiga	
7	Ococias Kyoto	Kyoto, Kyoto	Promoted from Division 2 as champions
8	Ikoma FC Nara (ja)	Ikoma, Nara	Change name from Velago Ikoma

=== Division 2 ===
#	Teams	Hometown	Notes
1	FC AWJ (ja)	Awaji, Hyōgo	Relegated in 7th place from Division 1
2	BANDITO Ikoma	Ikoma, Nara	Promoted as champions of the Kansai Prefectural Finals.
3	Hannan University SC	Matsubara, Osaka	
4	Kansai FC 2008 (ja)	Osaka, Osaka	Because Asuka FC was relegated to the Kansai 1st division, Kansai FC 2008 was not promoted.
5	Kobe FC 1970 (ja)	Kobe, Kobe	Relegated in 8th place from Division 1
6	AC Middle Range (ja)	Higashiyodogawa, Osaka	
7	Osaka City SC	Osaka, Osaka	Promoted by winning the Kansai Prefectural finals place playoff match.
8	Route 11 (ja)	Kishiwada, Osaka	

== Kansai Soccer League Champions ==
Edition	Year	Winner
1	1966	Osaka Sportsman Club (1)
2	1967	Osaka Sportsman Club (2)
3	1968	Dainichi Nippon Cable (1)
4	1969	Kyoto Shiko Club (1)
5	1970	Tanabe Pharmaceuticals SC (1)
6	1971	Kyoto Shiko Club (2)
7	1972	Nippon Steel Hirohata (1)
8	1973	Sumitomo Metals (1)
9	1974	Yanmar Club (1)
10	1975	Mitsubishi Heavy Industries Kobe (1)
11	1976	Dainichi Nippon Cable (2)
12	1977	NTT Kinki SC (1)
13	1978	Dainichi Nippon Cable (3)
14	1979	Kyoto Shiko Club (3)
15	1980	NTT Kinki SC (2)
16	1981	NTT Kinki SC (3)
17	1982	Hyogo Teachers (1)
18	1983	Matsushita Electric (1)
19	1984	Kyoto Police (1)
20	1985	NTT Kansai FC (4)
21	1986	Osaka Teachers SC (1)
22	1987	Kyoto Police SC (2)
23	1988	Kyoto Shiko Club (4)
24	1989	Sanyo Electric Sumoto SC (1)
25	1990	Kyoto Police SC (3)
26	1991	Osaka Gas SC (1)
27	1992	NTT Kansai FC (5)
28	1993	Tanabe Pharmaceutical (2)
29	1994	NTT Kansai FC (6)
30	1995	NTT Kansai FC (7)
31	1996	NTT Kansai FC (8)
32	1997	Sagawa Express Osaka SC (1)
33	1998	Sagawa Express Osaka SC (2)
34	1999	FC Kyoto BAMB 1993 (1)
35	2000	Sagawa Express Osaka SC (3)
36	2001	Sagawa Express Osaka SC (4)
37	2002	SP Kyoto FC (1)
38	2003	Ain Foods FC (1)
39	2004	Laranja Kyoto (1)
40	2005	Banditonce Kobe (2)
41	2006	Banditonce Kobe (3)
42	2007	Banditonce Kobe (4)
43	2008	Banditonce Kakogawa (5)
44	2009	Sanyo Electric Sumoto SC (2)
45	2010	Sanyo Electric Sumoto SC (3)
46	2011	Nara Club (1)
47	2012	Amitie SC (2)
48	2013	FC Osaka (1)
49	2014	Nara Club (2)
50	2015	Arterivo Wakayama (1)
51	2016	Arterivo Wakayama (2)
52	2017	Amitie Kyoto (3)
53	2018	Banditonce Kakogawa (6)
54	2019	Ococias Kyoto (4)
55	2020	Tiamo Hirakata (1)
56	2021	Ococias Kyoto AC (5)
57	2022	Arterivo Wakayama (3)
58	2023	Arterivo Wakayama (4)
59	2024	Asuka FC (1)
60	2025	Arterivo Wakayama (5)
61	2026	

== See also ==
- Japanese association football league system
- Japanese Regional Leagues
