= FC Tiamo Hirakata =

Japanese football club

TIAMO Hirakata ティアモ枚方
- Full name: Football Club Tiamo Hirakata
- Founded: 2004; 22 years ago
- Ground: Hirakata City Athletics Stadium; Hirakata, Osaka
- Capacity: 2,500
- Chairman: Takashi Murashima
- Manager: Takahiro Futagawa
- League: Japan Football League
- 2025: 4th of 16
- Website: fctiamo.net
Home colours	Away colours

FC TIAMO Hirakata (FCティアモ枚方, Efu Shī Tiamo Hirakata) is a football (soccer) club based in Hirakata, Osaka Prefecture in Japan. They currently play in the Japan Football League, Japanese fourth tier of football league.

== History ==
Founded in 2004 by the will of three former Gamba Osaka players - Junichi Inamoto, Ryuji Bando and Toru Araiba -, the club was initially named FC Ibanina, a name came up with the merge of the three players' name. Then in 2006 the club was renamed FC TIAMO: ti amo stays for Italian "I love you". Araiba actually remained the only one managing the new-born club, adding the suffix Hirakata only in 2015. The club won several promotions along the years and now hopes to reach Japan Football League and possibly J3 League before 2019.

In 2020 season, TIAMO Hirakata won the regional championship for the first time ever in their history and won promotion to the Japan Football League for the 2021 season.

The club will play their 5th consecutive season in the Japan Football League in 2025.

== League & cup record ==
Champions	Runners-up	Third place	Promoted	Relegated

League												Emperor's Cup	Shakaijin Cup
Season	Division	Pos.	P	W	D	L	F	A	GD	Pts	Attendance/G	Emperor's Cup	Shakaijin Cup
2014	Kansai Soccer; League (Div. 2)	1st	14	8	1	5	33	24	9	25		Did not qualify	
2015	Kansai Soccer; League (Div. 1)	8th	14	1	0	13	12	36	-24	3		Did not qualify	
2016	Kansai Soccer; League (Div. 2)	1st	14	9	3	2	30	10	20	30		Did not qualify	
2017	Kansai Soccer; League (Div. 1)	2nd	14	8	2	4	36	28	8	26		Did not qualify	Semi-final
2018	Kansai Soccer; League (Div. 1)	4th	14	6	3	5	26	22	4	21		Did not qualify	1st round
2019	Kansai Soccer; League (Div. 1)	2nd	14	10	3	1	40	17	23	33		Did not qualify	Champions
2020	Kansai Soccer; League (Div. 1)	1st	7	3	4	0	14	6	8	13		3rd round	Not eligible
2021	JFL	8th	32	14	6	12	58	57	1	48	300	Did not qualify	Not eligible
2022	JFL	13th	30	9	5	16	40	50	-10	32	584	Did not qualify	Not eligible
2023	JFL	12th	28	8	10	10	32	42	-10	34	419	Did not qualify	Not eligible
2024	JFL	3rd	30	15	5	10	49	45	4	50	658	Did not qualify	Not eligible
2025	JFL	4th	30	15	5	10	58	42	+16	50	761	Did not qualify	Not eligible
2026–27	JFL	TBD	30									TBD	Not eligible

Key

- Pos. = Position in league; P = Games played; W = Games won; D = Games drawn; L = Games lost; F = Goals scored; A = Goals conceded; GD = Goals difference; Pts = Points gained
- Attendance/G = Average home league attendance

== Honours ==
FC Tiamo Hirakata
Honour	No.	Years
Kansai Soccer League Div. 2	2	2014, 2016
Shakaijin Cup	1	2019
Kansai Soccer League Div. 1	1	2020
Japanese Regional Football Champions League	1	2020
Osaka Football Championship Emperor's Cup Osaka Prefectural Qualifiers	1	2020

== Players ==
=== Current squad ===
As of 1 December 2025. Note: Flags indicate national team as defined under FIFA eligibility rules; some limited exceptions apply. Players may hold more than one non-FIFA nationality.

No.	Pos.	Nation	Player
2	DF	BRA	Willian
3	DF	JPN	Travis Takahashi
5	MF	JPN	Tatsuya Uchida
6	MF	JPN	Ren Shibamoto
8	MF	JPN	Naoki Hara
11	FW	NGA	Emeka Basil
13	MF	JPN	Toshiki Onozawa
14	DF	JPN	Itsuki Miyazaki
15	DF	JPN	Shinji Yamano
16	DF	JPN	Hayato Abe
17	FW	JPN	Reo Takeshita
18	MF	JPN	Takuma Goto
19	FW	JPN	Yuto Tsumura
20	FW	JPN	Riku Koyanagi
21	GK	JPN	Rintaro Tomizawa

No.	Pos.	Nation	Player
23	DF	JPN	Felipe Bessa
25	MF	JPN	Rikiya Yamada
26	MF	JPN	Shuto Kawai
27	MF	JPN	Takuto Hirao
29	MF	JPN	Kengo Kotani
30	MF	JPN	Ryuki Yamaguchi
31	GK	JPN	Riku Okuno
33	MF	JPN	Yudai Kubo
34	MF	JPN	Areki Watabe
36	DF	JPN	Taisei Ishii (on loan from Shonan Bellmare)
37	DF	JPN	Sukai Numata
40	MF	JPN	Yudai Nakata (on loan from Thespa Gunma)
41	GK	KOR	Park Kwang-gyu
49	GK	JPN	Raihei Kurokawa (on loan from Ehime FC)

=== Out on loan ===
Note: Flags indicate national team as defined under FIFA eligibility rules; some limited exceptions apply. Players may hold more than one non-FIFA nationality.

No.	Pos.	Nation	Player
4	DF	JPN	Malick Fofana (at FC Osaka)
9	FW	JPN	Himan Morimoto (at Reilac Shiga)
22	DF	JPN	Kei Ikoma (at Nara Club)

== Coaching staff ==
Position	Staff
Manager	(Japan) Takahiro Futagawa
Head coach	(United Kingdom) Ben Cahn
Assistant coach	(Japan) So Higuchi
Goalkeeper coach	(Japan) Hiroyuki Takeda
Chief trainer	(Japan) Katsuaki Shibutani

== Managerial history ==
Manager	Nationality	Tenure	
Manager	Nationality	Start	Finish
Takuya Yamamoto	Japan	1 February 2017	31 January 2019
Shigeki Tsujimoto	Japan	1 February 2019	31 January 2020
Yoshizumi Ogawa	Japan	1 February 2020	31 January 2023
Takahiro Futagawa	Japan	1 February 2023	present
