= Nara Club =

Japanese football club

Nara Club 奈良クラブ
- Nickname: Nara
- Founded: 1991; 35 years ago
- Stadium: Rohto Field Nara, Nara
- Capacity: 30,600
- Coordinates: 34°41′54″N 135°49′45″E
- Owner: BG Sports (14.98%)
- Chairman: Mitsuru Hamada
- Manager: Masashi Oguro
- League: J3 League
- 2025: J3 League, 9th of 20
- Website: naraclub.jp
Home colours	Away colours

Nara Club (奈良クラブ, Nara Kurabu) is a Japanese football (soccer) club based in the Nara city, capital of Nara Prefecture. They currently play in J3 League, the third tier professional in the Japanese football.

== History ==
The club was originally established in Nara in 1991 under the name Tonan Club (都南クラブ, Tonan Kurabu) and it became a member of the Football Association of Nara. The club went up to the top division in 1997.

It was renamed to its current name in 2008, and was promoted to the regional league in 2009. In 2014, they won the Regional League promotion series, earning promotion to the Japan Football League, where they played from 2015 to 2022.

On 5 November 2022, Nara was promoted to the J3 League for the first time in their history, after beating Veertien Mie in a narrow 1–0 win, with Sotaro Yamamoto scoring the winning goal in the 86th minute, to confirm their early access to the J3, a few rounds before the end of the season. The Nara-based club was promoted after eight consecutive seasons in the JFL. 15 days later at the same month, Nara secured their first JFL title, after drawing 1–1 with Sony Sendai at the last round of the competition. A ten-goal difference in Nara's favor them and FC Osaka was the determining factor that gave Nara the league title.

On 24 October 2023, Nara Club announcement officially granted J2 License after approval of Club Licensing Board.

Starting in 2024, the club partnered with BG Group from the Kingdom of Thailand as one of their shirt sponsors and Thai players Patrick Gustavssonn and Kiadtiphon Udom joined from BG Pathum United FC, which is owned by BG. On January 24, 2025, it was announced that a capital alliance would be formed with BG Group, which will acquire and hold 14.98% of the shares for approximately 92 million yen.

== Stadium ==
Nara Club currently plays its home matches at the Rohto Field Nara. The capacity is 30,600.

== League and cup record ==
Champions	Runners-up	Third place	Promoted	Relegated

League													J.League Cup	Emperor's Cup	Shakaijin Cup
Season	Division	Tier	Teams	Pos.	P	W	D	L	F	A	GD	Pts	J.League Cup	Emperor's Cup	Shakaijin Cup
Tonan Club
1992	Nara Pref. League Edu.	11	*	3rd	*	*	*	*	*	*	*	*	Not eligible	*	*
1993	Nara Pref. League Div. 5	10	*	1st	*	*	*	*	*	*	*	*	Not eligible	*	*
1994	Nara Pref. League Div. 4	8	*	1st	*	*	*	*	*	*	*	*	Not eligible	*	*
1995	Nara Pref. League Div. 3	7	*	1st	*	*	*	*	*	*	*	*	Not eligible	*	*
1996	Nara Pref. League Div. 2	6	*	1st	*	*	*	*	*	*	*	*	Not eligible	*	*
1997	Nara Pref. League (Div. 1)	5	*	6th	*	*	*	*	*	*	*	*	Not eligible	*	*
1998	Nara Pref. League (Div. 1)	5	*	4th	*	*	*	*	*	*	*	*	Not eligible	*	*
1999	Nara Pref. League (Div. 1)	6	*	3rd	*	*	*	*	*	*	*	*	Not eligible	*	*
2000	Nara Pref. League (Div. 1)	6	*	2nd	*	*	*	*	*	*	*	*	Not eligible	*	*
2001	Nara Pref. League (Div. 1)	6	*	1st	*	*	*	*	*	*	*	*	Not eligible	*	*
2002	Nara Pref. League (Div. 1)	6	11	7th	10	3	3	4	14	14	0	12	Not eligible	Did not qualify	Did not qualify
2003	Nara Pref. League (Div. 1)	6	11	5th	10	6	0	4	17	14	3	18	Not eligible	Did not qualify	Did not qualify
2004	Nara Pref. League (Div. 1)	6	11	1st	10	8	1	1	25	8	17	25	Not eligible	Did not qualify	Did not qualify
2005 (Note: It was originally 12 teams participating. Tenri Univ. FC was disqualified, and the rest of 11 teams had to compete.)	Nara Pref. League (Div. 1)	6	11	3rd	10	6	1	3	25	11	14	19	Not eligible	Did not qualify	Did not qualify
2006 (Note: It was originally 12 teams participating. Ikoma SC was disqualified, and the rest of 11 teams had to compete.)	Nara Pref. League (Div. 1)	6	11	1st	10	8	1	1	31	11	20	25	Not eligible	Did not qualify	Did not qualify
2007	Nara Pref. League (Div. 1)	6	12	3rd	11	6	1	4	22	10	12	22	Not eligible	Did not qualify	Did not qualify
Nara Club
2008	Nara Pref. League (Div. 1)	6	12	2nd	11	8	3	0	39	9	30	27	Not eligible	Did not qualify	1st round
2009	Kansai Soccer League (Div. 2)	5	8	1st	14	9	3	2	47	18	29	30	Not eligible	2nd round	Did not qualify
2010	Kansai Soccer League (Div. 1)	4	8	4th	14	6	6	2	36	24	12	24	Not eligible	1st round	Did not qualify
2011	Kansai Soccer League (Div. 1)	4	8	1st	14	11	2	1	42	13	29	35	Not eligible	1st round	Did not qualify
2012	Kansai Soccer League (Div. 1)	4	8	2nd	14	8	5	1	28	11	17	29	Not eligible	2nd round	Did not qualify
2013	Kansai Soccer League (Div. 1)	4	8	5th	14	3	4	7	11	22	−11	14	Not eligible	2nd round	Did not qualify
2014	Kansai Soccer League (Div. 1)	5	8	1st	14	10	3	1	30	11	19	33	Not eligible	3rd round	Quarter-finals
2015	JFL	4	16	7th	30	13	7	10	33	28	5	46	Not eligible	1st round	Not eligible
2016	JFL	4	16	10th	30	11	7	12	41	48	-7	37	Not eligible	1st round	Not eligible
2017	JFL	4	16	7th	30	10	10	10	41	51	-10	40	Not eligible	1st round	Not eligible
2018	JFL	4	16	8th	30	12	6	12	33	32	1	42	Not eligible	2nd round	Not eligible
2019	JFL	4	16	14th	30	8	10	12	27	32	-5	34	Not eligible	1st round	Not eligible
2020	JFL	4	16	13th	15	5	3	7	21	21	0	18	Not eligible	2nd round	Not eligible
2021	JFL	4	17	10th	32	10	13	9	39	36	3	43	Not eligible	Did not qualify	Not eligible
2022	JFL	4	16	1st	30	16	11	3	48	25	23	59	Not eligible	1st round	Not eligible
2023	J3	3	20	5th	38	15	12	11	45	32	13	57	Not eligible	1st round	Not eligible
2024	J3	3	20	17th	38	7	18	13	43	56	-13	39	2nd round	2nd round	Not eligible
2025	J3	3	20	9th	38	15	11	12	50	46	4	56	1st round	2nd round	Not eligible
2026	J3	3	40	25th	18	5	4	9	25	34	-9	21	N/A	N/A	Not eligible
2026-27	J3	3	20	TBD	38								TBD	TBD	Not eligible

Key

- Pos. = Position in league; P = Games played; W = Games won; D = Games drawn; L = Games lost; F = Goals scored; A = Goals conceded; GD = Goals difference; Pts = Points gained
- Source: http://naraclub.jp/club

== Honours ==
Nara Club Honours
Honour	No.	Years
Nara Prefecture League Division 5	1	1993
Nara Prefecture League Division 4	1	1994
Nara Prefecture League Division 3	1	1995
Nara Prefecture League Division 2	1	1996
Nara Prefecture League Division 1	3	2001, 2004, 2006
Kansai League Division 2	1	2009
Nara Prefectural Football Championship (Emperor's Cup Prefectural Qualifiers)	16	2009, 2010, 2011, 2012, 2013, 2014, 2015, 2016, 2017, 2018, 2019, 2020, 2022, 2023, 2024, 2025
Kansai League Division 1	2	2011, 2014
KSL Cup	2	2012, 2014
Japan Football League	1	2022

== Players ==
=== Current squad ===
As of 1 August 2026. Note: Flags indicate national team as defined under FIFA eligibility rules; some limited exceptions apply. Players may hold more than one non-FIFA nationality.

No.	Pos.	Nation	Player
1	GK	JPN	Tatsuki Miyazawa
2	DF	JPN	Kakeru Takahata
6	DF	JPN	Itsuki Miyazaki
7	MF	JPN	Ryosuke Tamura
8	DF	JPN	Arata Yoshida
9	FW	JPN	Yuta Togashi
10	MF	JPN	Rin Morita
11	MF	JPN	Ryo Sato
13	FW	JPN	Rikuto Ando (on loan from Tegevajaro Miyazaki)
14	FW	JPN	Sora Mochizuki
16	DF	JPN	Yudai Okuda
18	MF	JPN	Takuma Goto (on loan from FC Tiamo Hirakata)
19	FW	JPN	Tomoya Sekiguchi
21	MF	JPN	Riki Tomizu
22	DF	JPN	Kei Ikoma
26	DF	JPN	Shugo Inoue
27	DF	JPN	Masato Nakayama

No.	Pos.	Nation	Player
29	MF	JPN	Seren Ichimura
30	MF	JPN	Shunji Masuda
33	DF	JPN	Hiroto Sato
36	DF	JPN	Taisei Ishii (on loan from FC Tiamo Hirakata)
37	MF	JPN	Genki Hamana
40	DF	JPN	Yuzuru Yoshimura
47	MF	NGR	Olasunkanmi Dayo
48	MF	JPN	Shota Kawanishi
49	GK	JPN	Raihei Kurokawa (on loan from Ehime FC)
50	MF	JPN	Ren Shibamoto (on loan from FC Tiamo Hirakata)
51	GK	JPN	Noa Sekinuma
54	FW	JPN	Shuhei Kawasaki
70	FW	THA	Siwakorn Ponsan (on loan from BG Pathum United)
77	MF	THA	Nanthiphat Chaiman (on loan from BG Pathum United)
96	GK	ESP	Marc Vito
99	FW	JPN	Himan Morimoto

=== Out on loan ===
Note: Flags indicate national team as defined under FIFA eligibility rules; some limited exceptions apply. Players may hold more than one non-FIFA nationality.

No.	Pos.	Nation	Player
5	DF	JPN	Daisei Suzuki (at Ikoma FC Nara)
—	MF	JPN	Shogo Miyashita (at FC Ise-Shima)
42	FW	JPN	Taishiro Okazaki (at Iwate Grulla Morioka)

== Club staff ==
Position	Staff
Manager	(Japan) Masashi Oguro
Assistant manager	(Japan) Kenta Betsuki
Goalkeeper coach	(Japan) Masatoshi Hayashi
Interpreter	(Japan) Yosuke Fukuda
Analyst and side affairs	(Japan) Kazuki Fujiwara
Chief trainer	(Japan) Hiroshi Fujimoto
Chief trainer	(Japan) Kazushi Matsumura

== Managerial history ==
As of April 2026

Manager	Nationality	Tenure	
Manager	Nationality	Start	Finish
Koji Yamaguchi	Japan	1991	2009
Ken'ichiro Fujimoto	Japan	2010	
Satoru Yoshida	Japan	1 January 2011	31 December 2011
Masashi Hachūda	Japan	1 February 2012	3 January 2013
Jiro Yabe	Japan	3 July 2012	7 October 2013
Jun Mizukoshi	Japan	8 October 2013	31 January 2014
Atsushi Nakamura	Japan	1 February 2014	31 January 2017
Norihiro Satsukawa	Japan	12 February 2017	31 January 2019
Koichi Sugiyama	Japan	12 February 2019	31 January 2020
Maiki Hayashi	Japan	1 February 2020	31 January 2021
Julián Marín Bazalo	Spain	1 February 2021	4 September 2024
Ichizo Nakata	Japan	4 September 2024	12 June 2025
Michiharu Otagiri	Japan	12 June 2025	8 December 2025
Masashi Oguro	Japan	14 December 2025	present

== Kit evolution ==
Home kit - 1st
2009 - 2010	2011	2012	2013	2014
2015	2016	2017	2018	2019
2020	2021	2022	2023	2024
2025	2026 -			

Away kit - 2nd
2009 - 2010	2011	2012	2013	2014
2015	2016	2017	2018	2019
2020	2021	2022	2023	2024
2025	2026 -			

Others - 3rd
2021 SP FP	2022 SP FP	2023 SP FP	2024 SP FP	2025 SP FP
2025; Daiwa House; Group Day
