= 2011 Japanese Regional Leagues =

Japanese amateur leagues football season

Japanese Regional Leagues
- Season: 2011

These are the statistics of the 2011 Japanese Regional Leagues.

== Champions list ==
Region	Champions
Hokkaido	Club Fields Norbritz Hokkaidō
Tohoku	Fukushima United
Kantō	YSCC
Hokushinetsu	Japan Soccer College
Tokai	Fujieda MY
Kansai	Nara Club
Chugoku	Dezzolla Shimane
Shikoku	Ehime Shimanami
Kyushu	HOYO AC ELAN Oita

== League standings ==
=== Hokkaidō ===
2011 was the 34th season of Hokkaido League. The season started May 15 and ended October 9. It was contested by eight teams and Club Fields Norbritz Hokkaidō won the tournament and qualified for the All-Japan Regional Promotion Series. Iwamizawa Hokushūkai, Komazawa OB, & Tokachi Fairsky Genesis were promoted from the Hokkaido Block Leagues

Sapporo FC official name is Sapporo Shūkyūdan.

After the season was over, Blackpecker Hakodate & Iwamizawa were relegated to the Block leagues.

Pos	Team	Pld	W	D	L	GF	GA	GD	Pts	Qualification
1	Club Fields Norbritz Hokkaidō (C, Q)	14	12	2	0	64	8	+56	38	Qualification for All Japan Regional Promotion Series
2	Sapporo University Goal Plunderers	14	11	2	1	51	11	+40	35	
3	Tokachi Fairsky Genesis	14	7	2	5	42	29	+13	23	
4	Rokkatei Marseis	14	7	0	7	40	37	+3	21	
5	Sapporo Shūkyūdan	14	7	0	7	21	23	−2	21	
6	Komazawa OB	14	6	0	8	25	27	−2	18	
7	Blackpecker Hakodate (R)	14	2	0	12	14	51	−37	6	Relegation to Hokkaido Block leagues
8	Iwamizawa Hokushūkai (R)	14	1	0	13	12	83	−71	3	Relegation to Hokkaido Block leagues

Source: rsssf.com
Rules for classification: 1) points; 2) goal difference; 3) number of goals scored.
(C) Champions; (Q) Qualified for the phase indicated; (R) Relegated

=== Tōhoku ===
==== Division 1 ====
Pos	Team	Pld	W	D	L	GF	GA	GD	Pts
1	Fukushima United	12	11	0	1	53	6	+47	33
2	Grulla Morioka	12	8	3	1	35	15	+20	27
3	NEC Tokin	12	6	2	4	32	20	+12	20
4	Akita Cambiare	12	6	1	5	56	29	+27	19
5	Morioka Zebra	12	5	2	5	31	23	+8	17
6	Fuji Club 2003	12	1	1	10	12	45	−33	4
7	Shiogama Wiese	12	0	1	11	6	87	−81	1

Source: rsssf.com
Rules for classification: 1) points; 2) goal difference; 3) number of goals scored.

==== Division 2 ====
Pos	Team	Pld	W	D	L	GF	GA	GD	Pts
1	Vanraure Hachinohe	10	10	0	0	61	1	+60	30
2	Ganju Iwate	10	9	0	1	51	5	+46	27
3	TDK Shinwakai	10	6	1	3	19	16	+3	19
4	Sendai Nakada	10	5	2	3	26	20	+6	17
5	ReinMeer Aomori	10	5	1	4	28	21	+7	16
6	Mizusawa Club	10	3	2	5	18	26	−8	11
7	Marysol Matsushima	10	2	4	4	11	20	−9	10
8	Ōmiya Club	10	3	1	6	18	40	−22	10
9	Parafrente Yonezawa	10	2	2	6	16	39	−23	8
10	Nippon Steel Kamaishi	10	2	1	7	16	48	−32	7
11	Tōno Club	10	1	0	9	9	37	−28	3

Source: rsssf.com
Rules for classification: 1) points; 2) goal difference; 3) number of goals scored.

=== Kantō ===
==== Division 1 ====
Pos	Team	Pld	W	D	L	GF	GA	GD	Pts
1	YSCC	14	12	1	1	34	8	+26	37
2	Saitama	14	9	0	5	29	26	+3	27
3	Ryutsu Keizai University	14	8	1	5	33	16	+17	25
4	Korea	14	7	1	6	25	22	+3	22
5	Tonan Maebashi	14	5	2	7	20	26	−6	17
6	Vertfee Takahara Nasu	14	5	2	7	21	29	−8	17
7	Kanagawa Teachers	14	4	0	10	22	32	−10	12
8	Toho Titanium	14	2	1	11	10	35	−25	7

Source: rsssf.com
Rules for classification: 1) points; 2) goal difference; 3) number of goals scored.

==== Division 2 ====
Pos	Team	Pld	W	D	L	GF	GA	GD	Pts
1	Sagamihara	14	10	1	3	40	12	+28	31
2	Aries Tokyo	14	9	2	3	30	16	+14	29
3	Club Dragons	14	9	1	4	23	14	+9	28
4	Yokohama Takeru	14	8	0	6	29	24	+5	24
5	Hitachi Building System	14	5	1	8	15	26	−11	16
6	Tokio Marine & Nichido Fire Insurance	14	5	0	9	19	29	−10	15
7	Atsugi Marcus	14	3	3	8	16	29	−13	12
8	Almaleza	14	2	2	10	14	36	−22	8

Source: rsssf.com
Rules for classification: 1) points; 2) goal difference; 3) number of goals scored.

=== Hokushin'etsu ===
==== Division 1 ====
Pos	Team	Pld	W	D	L	GF	GA	GD	Pts
1	Japan Soccer College	14	12	1	1	50	14	+36	37
2	Artista Tōmi	14	10	2	2	30	9	+21	32
3	Ueda Gentian	14	8	3	3	32	23	+9	27
4	Saurcos Fukui	14	5	5	4	22	18	+4	20
5	Granscena Niigata	14	4	2	8	21	30	−9	14
6	Teihens	14	3	2	9	25	32	−7	11
7	Valiente Toyama	14	3	2	9	18	39	−21	11
8	Fukui KSC	14	2	1	11	11	44	−33	7

Source: rsssf.com
Rules for classification: 1) points; 2) goal difference; 3) number of goals scored.

==== Division 2 ====
Pos	Team	Pld	W	D	L	GF	GA	GD	Pts
1	Toyama Shinjō Club	14	12	1	1	46	12	+34	37
2	Antelope Shiojiri	14	11	0	3	39	14	+25	33
3	FC Hokuriku	14	8	1	5	34	33	+1	25
4	'09 Keidai F.C.	14	6	1	7	32	24	+8	19
5	Cups Seiro	14	6	1	7	30	23	+7	19
6	Maruoka Phoenix	14	5	1	8	20	38	−18	16
7	Niigata University of Health and Welfare	14	3	0	11	17	44	−27	9
8	Jamineiro	14	2	1	11	15	45	−30	7

Source: rsssf.com
Rules for classification: 1) points; 2) goal difference; 3) number of goals scored.

=== Tōkai ===
==== Division 1 ====
Pos	Team	Pld	W	D	L	GF	GA	GD	Pts
1	Fujieda MY	14	12	2	0	42	9	+33	38
2	Suzuka Rampole	14	7	2	5	22	21	+1	23
3	Kariya	14	6	3	5	28	24	+4	21
4	Fujieda City Hall	14	6	2	6	14	23	−9	20
5	Gifu Second	14	5	4	5	21	19	+2	19
6	Yazaki Valente	14	3	4	7	19	32	−13	13
7	Maruyasu Industries	14	3	2	9	22	26	−4	11
8	Toyota Shūkyūdan	14	2	5	7	15	29	−14	11

Source: rsssf.com
Rules for classification: 1) points; 2) goal difference; 3) number of goals scored.

==== Division 2 ====
Pos	Team	Pld	W	D	L	GF	GA	GD	Pts
1	Chūkyo Univ. FC	16	11	3	2	42	16	+26	36
2	Chukyo University	16	9	6	1	40	17	+23	33
3	Hamamatsu University	16	8	4	4	42	24	+18	28
4	Nagara club	16	6	5	5	30	23	+7	23
5	Kasugai Club	16	6	3	7	23	30	−7	21
6	Ise YAMATO	16	6	1	9	26	25	+1	19
7	Konica Minolta Toyokawa	16	4	4	8	28	47	−19	16
8	Fuyo Club	16	4	2	10	24	52	−28	14
9	VOLARE Hamamatsu	16	3	2	11	20	44	−24	11

Source: rsssf.com
Rules for classification: 1) points; 2) goal difference; 3) number of goals scored.

=== Kansai ===
==== Division 1 ====
Pos	Team	Pld	W	D	L	GF	GA	GD	Pts
1	Nara Club	14	11	2	1	42	13	+29	35
2	Banditonce Kakogawa	14	10	2	2	20	14	+6	32
3	Amitie S.C. Kyōto	14	6	3	5	24	20	+4	21
4	Sanyo Electric Sumoto	14	5	3	6	15	25	−10	18
5	Ain Foods	14	4	5	5	21	25	−4	17
6	Laranja Kyoto	14	4	1	9	14	18	−4	13
7	TOJITSU Shiga	14	2	5	7	15	23	−8	11
8	Hannan University	14	1	5	8	20	33	−13	8

Source: rsssf.com
Rules for classification: 1) points; 2) goal difference; 3) number of goals scored.

==== Division 2 ====
Pos	Team	Pld	W	D	L	GF	GA	GD	Pts
1	Diablossa Takada	14	8	4	2	44	20	+24	28
2	Arterivo Wakayama	14	8	2	4	37	20	+17	26
3	Kyoto Shikō Club	14	7	4	3	38	22	+16	25
4	Biwako Hira	14	7	3	4	34	22	+12	24
5	Kwangaku Club	14	8	0	6	19	19	0	24
6	OSAKA KOREAN	14	5	1	8	17	33	−16	16
7	Renaiss Koga	14	4	1	9	21	45	−24	13
8	Kōbe 1970	14	1	1	12	14	43	−29	4

Source: rsssf.com
Rules for classification: 1) points; 2) goal difference; 3) number of goals scored.

=== Chūgoku ===
Pos	Team	Pld	W	D	L	GF	GA	GD	Pts
1	Dezzolla Shimane	18	16	0	2	60	19	+41	48
2	Renofa Yamaguchi	18	13	2	3	54	17	+37	41
3	Fagiano Okayama Next	18	12	1	5	48	16	+32	37
4	Mitsubishi Motors Mizushima	18	12	1	5	47	33	+14	37
5	Fuji Xerox Hiroshima	18	9	1	8	36	37	−1	28
6	NTN Okayama	18	6	2	10	27	35	−8	20
7	Matsue City	18	5	3	10	28	37	−9	18
8	JX Nippon Oil & Energy Mizushima	18	4	3	11	26	54	−28	15
9	Sagawa Express Chugoku	18	4	2	12	23	44	−21	14
10	Ube Yahhh-man	18	1	1	16	20	88	−68	4

Source: rsssf.com
Rules for classification: 1) points; 2) goal difference; 3) number of goals scored.

=== Shikoku ===
Pos	Team	Pld	W	D	L	GF	GA	GD	Pts
1	Ehime Shimanami	14	13	1	0	52	4	+48	40
2	Kuroshio	14	9	3	2	31	20	+11	30
3	Sanyo Electric Tokushima	14	7	3	4	22	14	+8	24
4	Minami Club	14	5	5	4	21	24	−3	20
5	Nangoku Kōchi	14	4	3	7	27	27	0	15
6	R.VELHO	14	4	2	8	19	29	−10	14
7	Korean Saijō	14	3	1	10	17	34	−17	10
8	Shōwa Club	14	2	0	12	9	46	−37	6

Source: rsssf.com
Rules for classification: 1) points; 2) goal difference; 3) number of goals scored.

=== Kyūshū ===
Pos	Team	Pld	W	PKW	PKL	L	GF	GA	GD	Pts
1	HOYO AC ELAN Oita	18	15	2	0	1	55	11	+44	49
2	Kagoshima	18	14	2	1	1	62	16	+46	47
3	Volca Kagoshima	18	10	2	3	3	37	12	+25	37
4	Nippon Steel Ōita	18	8	1	2	7	42	34	+8	28
5	Kyushu Sōgō Sports College	18	8	0	2	8	43	44	−1	26
6	Mitsubishi Heavy Industrial Nagasaki	18	5	2	4	7	25	36	−11	23
7	Saga LIXIL	18	5	3	1	9	27	35	−8	22
8	Okinawa Kaihō Bank	18	3	2	4	9	19	34	−15	17
9	MSU FC	18	2	3	0	13	20	82	−62	12
10	Kawazoe Club	18	2	1	1	14	20	46	−26	9

Source: rsssf.com
Rules for classification: 1) points; 2) goal difference; 3) number of goals scored.
