= Japanese Regional Football Champions League =

Japan Regional Football Champions League
- Founded: 1977; 49 years ago
- Region: Japan
- Confederation: AFC (Asia)
- Number of clubs: 12
- Promotion to: Japan Soccer League (1977–1991); Japan Football League (1992–1998); Japan Football League (1999–present)
- Current champions: J-Lease FC (1st title) (2025)
- Most championships: Yamaha Motor; Daikyo Oil Yokkaichi/Cosmo Daikyo; Nippon Denso; (2 titles each)
- Current: 2026 Japanese Regional Football Champions League

The Japanese Regional Champions League (Japanese: 全国地域サッカーチャンピオンズリーグ, Zenkoku Chiiki Sakkā Championzu Rīgu), known before 2016 as Japan Regional Football League Competition, is a nationwide play-off tournament meant as a transition for Japanese football clubs competing in regional leagues to the Japan Football League.

== History ==
Until 1976, the main entrance route for regional clubs to the Japan Soccer League was the All Japan Senior Football Championship, a cup competition. In 1977, to test clubs in a league environment before entrance to the league, the Japan Football Association devised this tournament.

In 1984 and 1985 more promotion places were added due to the JSL, expanding its divisions. In 1992 it began promoting clubs to the former JFL's second division and, from 1994 to 1998, to its single division. In 1999 and 2000 it added extra promotion places due to the formation and expansion of the new JFL.

Yamaha Motors (Júbilo Iwata) are, thus far, the only Regional Series champions to later become First Division champions. They are also the only club to retain the title, as they failed to be promoted in their first attempt due to losing a playoff series. Since 1980 every champion has been automatically promoted, exceptions being in 1993 (Nippon Denso/FC Kariya lost a playoff) and in 2002 (Ain Foods requested not to be promoted as they lacked the resources to compete at the national level).

== Qualification ==
Until 2009, the number of places in the tournament was 16, distributed as follows:

- All regional league champions (9 clubs)
- Four regional leagues runners-up (4 clubs)
- University club recommended by the All Japan University Football Association (1 club)
- Club recommended by the JFA (1 club)
- Shakaijin Cup winner (1 club)
- Other clubs (other league runners-up, Shakaijin Cup runners-up or third places, etc.) (0-3 clubs) – more allowed if Shakaijin Cup holder has won a regional league or been runner-up

As of 2024, the regional leagues runners-up are no longer eligible, and the All Japan University Football Association is no longer allowed to make recommendations, reducing the number of places to 12.

- All regional league champions (9 clubs)
- Shakaijin Cup semi-finalists not qualified yet by regional league title (3 clubs)

== Format ==
=== Preliminary round ===
The clubs are grouped in three groups of four teams, playing at a centralised venue (no home-and-away format is followed). The winners of each group and the best-ranked runners-up qualifies for the final round.

=== Final round ===
As of 2025, the four remaining teams plays in the same round-robin format, with all four teams being on a single group. The group winner guarantees promotion for the Japan Football League, whereas the second-placed team plays a promotion/relegation match against the 15th-placed JFL club. If the group winner can't or don't want to join the JFL, the group runners-up goes on to the promotion/relegation match against the bottom-ranked the JFL club. If the group runners-up or both group winners and runners-up are not eligible or don't want to join the JFL, there will be no promotion/relegation match.

== Winners ==
Teams in bold were promoted.

Year	Winner	Runner-up	Third place	Also promoted
1977	Yamaha Motors	**Toshiba Horikawa-cho**	Toho Titanium	
1978	**Yamaha Motors**	Toho Titanium	Dainichi Nippon Densen	
1979	**Cosmo Oil Yokkaichi**	Kyoto Shiko Club	Furukawa Electric Chiba	
1980	**Nagoya S.C.**	Furukawa Electric Chiba	Saitama Teachers	
1981	**Saitama Teachers**	NTT West Japan Kyoto	Cosmo Oil Yokkaichi	
1982	**Toho Titanium**	Seino Transportation	Hyōgo Teachers	
1983	**Yokohama TriStar**	**Matsushita**	Teijin Matsuyama	
1984	**Seino Transportation**	**Kyoto Police Dept.**	**TDK SC**	**Osaka Gas**
1985	**Cosmo Oil Yokkaichi**	**Kawasaki Steel Mizushima**	**Toho Titanium**	**NTT Kansai**
1986	**NTT Kanto**	**Mazda Auto Hiroshima**	Toyoda Machine Works	
1987	**Teijin Matsuyama**	**Fujieda City Hall**	Matsushima S.C.	
1988	**Mazda Auto Hiroshima**	**Kyoto Shiko Club**	Tokyo Gas	
1989	**Yomiuri S.C. Juniors**	**Otsuka Pharmaceutical**	Seino Transportation	
1990	**Tokyo Gas**	**Chuo Bohan**	Seino Transportation	
1991	**Osaka Gas**	Osaka Taidai Kemari Club	**Seino Transportation**	
1992	**PJM Futures**	**Toyota Motors Higashifuji**	NEC Yamagata	
1993	Nippon Denso	**NEC Yamagata**	Jatco	
1994	**Brummell Sendai**	**Fukushima FC**	Yokogawa Denki	
1995	**Nippon Denso**	**Ōita F.C.**	Yokogawa Denki	
1996	**Jatco**	**Prima Ham**	Mazda S.C.	
1997	**Sony Sendai FC**	**Albirex Niigata**	Yokogawa Denki	
1998	**Yokogawa Denki**	Hitachi Shimizu	Ehime FC	
1999	**Alo's Hokuriku**	**Tochigi SC**	Honda Luminoso Sayama F.C.	**F.C. Kyoken**
2000	**Sagawa Express Tokyo SC**	**YKK AP F.C.**	**NTT Kumamoto**	**S.C. Tottori**; **Ehime FC**
2001	**Sagawa Express Osaka S.C.**	**Professor Miyazaki**	Nangoku Kochi F.C.	
2002	Ain Foods	**Sagawa Printing SC**	Shizuoka F.C.	
2003	**Thespa Kusatsu**	**Gunma F.C. Horikoshi**	Shizuoka F.C.	
2004	**Mitsubishi Motors Mizushima F.C.**	**Ryutsu Keizai University FC**	**Honda Lock SC**	
2005	**F.C. Ryukyu**	**JEF United Ichihara Chiba B**	**Rosso Kumamoto**	
2006	**TDK SC**	**FC Gifu**	Fagiano Okayama F.C.	
2007	**Fagiano Okayama**	**New Wave Kitakyushu**	**F.C. Mi-O Biwako Kusatsu**	
2008	**Machida Zelvia**	**V-Varen Nagasaki**	**Honda Lock**	
2009	**Matsumoto Yamaga**	**Hitachi Tochigi Uva**	**Zweigen Kanazawa**	
2010	**Kamatamare Sanuki**	**Nagano Parceiro**	Sanyo Electric Sumoto	
2011	**YSCC Yokohama**	**Fujieda MYFC**	**Hoyo AC Elan Ōita**	
2012	**SC Sagamihara**	**Fukushima United**	Norbritz Hokkaido	
2013	**Grulla Morioka**	**Fagiano Okayama Next**	FC Kagoshima (merged with Volca Kagoshima to form **Kagoshima United FC**)	**Vanraure Hachinohe**; **Azul Claro Numazu**; **Renofa Yamaguchi**; **Maruyasu Okazaki**
2014	**Nara Club**	**FC Osaka**	**Club Dragons**	
2015	**ReinMeer Aomori**	**Briobecca Urayasu**	Saurcos Fukui	
2016	**FC Imabari**	**Veertien Mie**	Suzuka Unlimited	
2017	**Cobaltore Onagawa**	**Tegevajaro Miyazaki**	Vonds Ichihara	
2018	**Matsue City**	**Suzuka Unlimited**	FC Kariya	
2019	**Iwaki FC**	**Kochi United SC**	Ococias Kyoto AC	
2020	**FC Tiamo Hirakata**	**FC Kariya**	Tochigi City FC	
2021	**Criacao Shinjuku**	FC Ise-Shima	Ococias Kyoto AC	
2022	**Briobecca Urayasu**	**Okinawa SV**	Tochigi City	
2023	**Tochigi City FC**	Vonds Ichihara	Tsukuba FC	
2024	**Asuka FC**	Vonds Ichihara	Fukui United FC	
2025	**J-Lease FC**	**Vonds Ichihara**	Veroskronos Tsuno	

Source: JFA

=== Wins by region ===
Clubs in bold compete in the J.League (any division) in the 2025 season. Clubs in italics no longer exist. A dagger (†) indicates clubs that moved away from the region after winning the title.

Region	Number of titles	Clubs
Kantō	15	Saitama SC, Toho Titanium SC, Yokohama Flügels, **Omiya Ardija**, Yomiuri S.C. Juniors, **FC Tokyo**, Yokogawa Musashino, Sagawa Express Tokyo, **Thespa Gunma**, **Machida Zelvia**, YSCC Yokohama, **SC Sagamihara**, Criacao Shinjuku, Briobecca Urayasu, **Tochigi City FC**
Tōkai	10	**Júbilo Iwata** (2), Cosmo Oil Yokkaichi (2), Nagoya S.C., Seino Transportation, Tosu Futures †, FC Kariya (2), Jatco SC
Tōhoku	7	**Vegalta Sendai**, Sony Sendai, **Blaublitz Akita**, Grulla Morioka, ReinMeer Aomori, Cobaltore Onagawa, **Iwaki FC**
Kansai	6	Osaka Gas, Sagawa Express Osaka, Ain Foods, **Nara Club**, FC Tiamo Hirakata, Asuka FC
Chūgoku	4	Mazda Auto Hiroshima, Mitsubishi Motors Mizushima, **Fagiano Okayama**, Matsue City
Shikoku	3	Teijin SC, **Kamatamare Sanuki**, **FC Imabari**
Koshin'etsu	2	ALO's Hokuriku, **Matsumoto Yamaga**
Kyūshū	2	**FC Ryukyu**, J-Lease FC
Hokkaidō	–	

== See also ==
- Sport in Japan
  - Football in Japan
    - Women's football in Japan
- Japan Football Association (JFA)

Soccer/Football
League system

- Japanese association football league system
- J.League
  - J1 League (Tier 1)
  - J2 League (Tier 2)
  - J3 League (Tier 3)
- Japan Football League (JFL) (Tier 4)
- Regional Champions League (Promotion playoffs to JFL)
- Regional Leagues (Tier 5/6)

Domestic cup

- Fujifilm Super Cup (Super Cup)
- Emperor's Cup (National Cup)
- J.League YBC Levain Cup (League Cup)

Futsal

- F.League
  - F1 League (Tier 1)
  - F2 League (Tier 2)
- JFA Futsal Championship (National Cup)
- F.League Ocean Cup (League Cup)

Beach soccer

- Beach Soccer Championship (National Cup)
