= 2021 Japan Football League =

Japan Football League
- Season: 2021
- Dates: 14 March – 5 December
- Champions: Iwaki FC
- Promoted: Iwaki FC
- Relegated: FC Kariya
- Matches: 272
- Goals: 694 (2.55 per match)

The 2021 Japan Football League (Japanese: 第23回日本フットボールリーグ[第23回 JFL 2021], Hepburn: Dai Nijūsankai Nihon Futtobōru Rīgu [Dai Nijūsankai JFL 2021]) was the eighth season of the nationwide fourth tier of Japanese football, and the 23rd season since the establishment of Japan Football League.

== Clubs ==
For the first time since 2012, 17 clubs have taken part in the JFL season. Last year no relegations were in place in J3, the league had the intent of seeing two more teams joining from the start, but only Tegevajaro Miyazaki got promoted with one game to play and joined J3 for the 2021 season. That's because Verspah Oita, who won the JFL for the first time in their history, were not promoted as they did not hold a J3 license, while Sony Sendai and Honda FC, who finished 3rd and 4th respectively, also didn't hold a J3 license.

FC Tiamo Hirakata and FC Kariya won promotion to the JFL by qualifying in the top two spots of the 44th Regional Pro Series. For the Hirataka-based side it was the first time in JFL, but Kariya are back after a twelve-year long hiatus.

There are six teams eligible for promotion with J3 licenses; these are highlighted in green in the following table.

Club name	Home town	Stadium	Capacity	Position	Notes
Honda FC	Hamamatsu, Shizuoka	Honda Miyakoda Soccer Stadium	2,506	JFL (4th)	
Honda Lock	Miyazaki, Miyazaki	Hinata Athletic Stadium	20,000	JFL (12th)	
Iwaki FC	Iwaki, Fukushima	Iwaki Green Field	5,600	JFL (7th)	100 Year Plan status and J3 license holders
FC Kariya	Kariya, Aichi	Wave Stadium Kariya	4,002	RPS 2nd	Winners of TASL and runners-up in 44th RPS
Kochi United SC	Kōchi, Kōchi	Kōchi Haruno Athletic Stadium	25,000	JFL (14th)	
Maruyasu Okazaki	Okazaki, Aichi	Okazaki Ryūhoku Stadium	5,000	JFL (16th)	
Matsue City FC	Matsue, Shimane	Matsue Municipal Athletic Stadium	24,000	JFL (10th)	
MIO Biwako Shiga	Kusatsu, Shiga	Higashiōmi Nunobiki Green Stadium	5,060	JFL (9th)	Applied for 100 Year Plan status
Nara Club	All cities/towns in Nara (Note: centering on Nara)	Rohto Field Nara	30,600	JFL (13th)	100 Year Plan status and J3 license holders
F.C. Osaka	Higashiōsaka, Osaka	Hanazono Rugby Stadium 2nd Ground	1,722	JFL (8th)	100 Year Plan status and J3 license holders
ReinMeer Aomori	Aomori, Aomori	Kakuhiro Group Athletic Stadium	20,809	JFL (15th)	100 Year Plan status and J3 license holders
Sony Sendai	Tagajō, Miyagi	Miyagi Seikyō Megumino Soccer Stadium	10,000	JFL (3rd)	
Suzuka Point Getters	Suzuka, Mie	AGF Suzuka Athletic Stadium	1,450	JFL (5th)	100 Year Plan status and J3 license holders
FC Tiamo Hirakata	Hirakata, Osaka	Hirakata Municipal Athletic Stadium	2,500	RPS 1st	Winners of KSL and 44th RPS
Tokyo Musashino United FC	Musashino, Tokyo	Musashino Municipal Athletic Stadium	5,188	JFL (11th)	Renamed from "Tokyo Musashino City FC"
Veertien Mie	All cities/towns in Mie (Note: centering on Kuwana & Yokkaichi)	Asahi Gas Energy Tōin Stadium	5,142	JFL (6th)	100 Year Plan status and J3 license holders
Verspah Oita	Yufu & Beppu, Ōita	Shōwa Denkō Soccer/Rugby Field	4,700	JFL (1st)	2020 champions, 100 Year Plan status

=== Personnel and kits ===
Club	Manager	Kit manufacturer
Honda FC	(Japan) Hiroyuki Abe	(England) Umbro
Honda Lock SC	(Japan) Yosuke Miyaji	(Italy) Kappa
Iwaki FC	(Japan) Yuzo Tamura	(United States) Under Armour
FC Kariya	(Japan) Kazuhiro Murata	(Japan) bonera
Kochi United SC	(Japan) Akihiro Nishimura	(Japan) bonera
Maruyasu Okazaki	(Japan) Hiroyasu Ibata	(Brazil) ATHLETA
Matsue City FC	(Japan) Noriaki Sanenobu	(Japan) soccer junky
MIO Biwako Shiga	(Japan) Hiroshi Otsuki	(Japan) JOGARBOLA
Nara Club	(Spain) Julián Marín Bazalo	(Japan) SQUADRA
F.C. Osaka	(Japan) Shinya Tsukahara	(Japan) bonera
ReinMeer Aomori	(Japan) Ryo Adachi	(England) Umbro
Sony Sendai FC	(Japan) Gen Nakamura	(England) Umbro
Suzuka Point Getters	(Japan) Yasutoshi Miura	(Brazil) ATHLETA
FC Tiamo Hirakata	(Japan) Yoshizumi Ogawa	(Japan) JOGARBOLA
Tokyo Musashino United FC	(Japan) Hisayuki Ikegami	(Japan) Yonex
Veertien Mie	(Japan) Yoshihiko Yamamoto	(Japan) Lwond
Verspah Oita	(Japan) Takashi Yamahashi	(Japan) YASUDA

=== Managerial changes ===
Team	Outgoing	Manner	Exit date		Position in table	Incoming	Incoming date		Ref.
Team	Outgoing	Manner	Announced on	Departed on	Position in table	Incoming	Announced on	Arrived on	Ref.
Veertien Mie	(Japan) Nobuhiro Ueno	Sacked	21 June 2021	21 June 2021	12th	(Japan) Yoshihiko Yamamoto	22 June 2021	22 June 2021	
Suzuka Point Getters	(Spain) Mila Martínez	Mutual consent	5 July 2021	5 July 2021	14th	(Japan) Tsukasa Ozawa (interim)	5 July 2021	5 July 2021	
Suzuka Point Getters	(Japan) Tsukasa Ozawa (interim)	Interim completed	15 July 2021	15 July 2021	11th	(Japan) Yasutoshi Miura	15 July 2021	15 July 2021	
FC Kariya	(Japan) Koji Kadota (interim)	Sacked	16 July 2021	16 July 2021	17th	(Japan) Ryo Iizuka	16 July 2021	16 July 2021	
Maruyasu Okazaki	(Japan) Ryuji Kitamura	Appointed technical director	20 July 2021	31 July 2021	11th	(Japan) Hiroyasu Ibata	27 July 2021	1 August 2021	
FC Kariya	(Japan) Ryo Iizuka (interim)	Interim completed	2 August 2021	2 August 2021	17th	(Japan) Kazuhiro Murata	2 August 2021	2 August 2021	

== League table ==
Pos	Team	Pld	W	D	L	GF	GA	GD	Pts	Promotion or qualification
1	**Iwaki FC** (Note: J.League 100 Year Plan clubs) (C, P)	32	21	8	3	65	28	+37	71	Promotion to J3 League (Note: Promotion was conditional on holding a J3 license (marked in bold in the table), finishing in the top 4 of the JFL, and finishing in the top 2 of the J.League 100 Year Plan clubs.)
2	Honda FC	32	20	7	5	69	25	+44	67	
3	Verspah Oita	32	19	5	8	46	24	+22	62	
4	**Suzuka Point Getters**	32	15	5	12	51	46	+5	50	
5	Matsue City	32	14	8	10	38	37	+1	50	
6	Sony Sendai	32	14	6	12	52	39	+13	48	
7	**F.C. Osaka**	32	13	9	10	37	35	+2	48	
8	Tiamo Hirakata	32	14	6	12	58	57	+1	48	
9	**ReinMeer Aomori**	32	12	9	11	41	49	−8	45	
10	**Nara Club**	32	10	13	9	39	36	+3	43	
11	**Veertien Mie**	32	10	10	12	40	43	−3	40	
12	MIO Biwako Shiga	32	10	7	15	35	48	−13	37	
13	Kochi United	32	9	6	17	30	49	−19	33	
14	Maruyasu Okazaki	32	8	9	15	27	46	−19	33	
15	Tokyo Musashino United	32	9	5	18	38	53	−15	32	
16	Honda Lock (O)	32	6	9	17	26	48	−22	27	Qualification for relegation play-offs (Note: Relegation will occur as follows. In case of 1 team promoted to J3: Japan Regional Football Champions League winners will play the 17th-placed team in JFL, and runners-up will also play the 16th-placed team in JFL.)
17	FC Kariya (R)	32	4	6	22	26	55	−29	18	Qualification for relegation play-offs

Updated to match(es) played on 28 November 2021. Source: JFL website (in Japanese)
Rules for classification: 1) Points; 2) goal difference; 3) goals scored; 4) head-to-head results (a. points, b. goal difference, c. goals scored); 5) number of wins; 6) disciplinary points; 7) play-off (if necessary)
(C) Champions; (O) Play-off winners; (P) Promoted; (R) Relegated

== Regional Leagues Relegation Playoffs ==
2021 JFL·Regional Leagues Playoffs (Japanese: 2021年度JFL·地域リーグ入れ替え戦)

18 December 2021
13:00

Honda Lock (2021 JFL 16th)	3 – 2	FC Ise-Shima (2021 Japan Regional Football Champions League runners-up)
Arashi Tamaki (8 minutes); Tomoki Mera (11 minutes); Ken Takahashi (20 minutes)	JFL Official	Miki Uematsu (84 minutes); Elichi Nakata (87 minutes)

Nobeoka Nishishina Athletic Stadium, Nobeoka, Miyazaki
Attendance: 400
Referee: Yoshihito Hori

Honda Lock remains in the JFL; FC Ise-Shima remains in the Tōkai Adult Soccer League Division 1.

18 December 2021
13:00

FC Kariya (2021 JFL 17th)	0 – 4	Criacao Shinjuku (2021 Japan Regional Football Champions League winners)
	JFL Official

Nagoya Minato Stadium, Nagoya, Aichi

FC Kariya was relegated to the Tōkai Adult Soccer League Division 1; Criacao Shinjuku was promoted to the JFL.

== Season statistics ==
=== Top scorers ===
As of 28 November 2021.

Rank	Player	Club	Goals
1	(Japan) Yuki Okazaki	Honda FC	16
2	(Japan) Motoki Fujiwara	Sony Sendai FC	12
2	(Japan) Reon Kodama	Honda FC	12
2	(Japan) Ryo Sato	FC Tiamo Hirakata	12
2	(Japan) Kohei Matsumoto	FC Tiamo Hirakata	12
6	(Japan) Daigo Furukawa	Iwaki FC	11

== See also ==
- Japan Football Association (JFA)

League

- Japanese association football league system
- J.League
  - 2021 J1 League (Tier 1)
  - 2021 J2 League (Tier 2)
  - 2021 J3 League (Tier 3)
- 2021 Regional Champions League (play-offs for promotion to JFL)
- 2021 Regional Leagues (Tier 5/6)

Cup(s)

- 2021 Fuji Xerox Super Cup (Super Cup)
- 2021 Emperor's Cup (National Open Cup)
- 2021 J.League YBC Levain Cup (League Cup)
