= 2026–27 Japan Football League =

Japan Football League for 2026–27

Japan Football League
- Season: 2026–27
- Dates: 29 August 2026 – 23 May 2027

The 2026–27 Japan Football League (Japanese: 第28回 日本フットボールリーグ (2026-2027) [第28回 JFL], Hepburn: Dai Nijūhachikai Nihon Futtobōru Rīgu [Dai Nijūhachikai JFL]) is the 28th season of JFL, since its establishment in 1999. This is also the thirteenth season of the league having a fourth-tier status in Japanese football since 2014.

== Overview ==
=== General ===
This marked the first Japan Football League season scheduled with a summer-to-spring format with 16 teams competing in the league – the thirteen teams from the previous season, one team relegated from the J3 League and two teams promoted from Regional Leagues.

The league's champion team earns automatic promotion to the J3 League, while the 2nd place team competes in a promotion/relegation play-off against the 19th-placed team from the J3 League. Meanwhile, the relegation playoff between the 15th-placed team in the JFL and the second-placed team in the JRFCL was abolished and starting from this season the bottom two teams (15th and 16th) are relegated directly to the fifth division depending on the region of origin of the team.

=== Teams promoted from Japanese Regional Leagues ===
J-Lease became the first team to be promoted on 24 November 2025 after defeating Tokyo United in the final round and at the same time as Veroskronos Tsuno lost to Vonds Ichihara where both matches ended with a score of 1-0.

Vonds Ichihara became the second team to be promoted on 30 November 2025, after defeating Atletico Suzuka in the JFL/Japanese Regional Leagues playoffs. Both promoted teams compete in the fourth division for the first time in their respective histories.

=== Teams relegated to Japanese Regional Leagues ===
Asuka became the first team to be relegated after a draw against Maruyasu Okazaki on 15 November 2025. Asuka was relegated to Kansai Soccer League Division 1 after spending one season in the fourth division.

Atletico Suzuka became the second team to be relegated after losing to Vonds Ichihara in the JFL/Japanese Regional Leagues playoffs on 30 November 2025. Atletico Suzuka was relegated to the Tōkai Soccer League Division 1 after spending six seasons in the fourth division.

=== Result from playoff ===
Reilac Shiga became the only team to be promoted to the J3 League because Honda, who were last season's champions and does not intend to gain promotion to the J. League. Reilac Shiga ended their 12-season stay in the fourth division by defeating Azul Claro Numazu in the J3/JFL playoffs with a 4-3 aggregate score on 14 December 2025. For Azul Claro Numazu, this result returned them to the fourth division after spending eight seasons in the third division.

== Teams ==
=== Teams changes ===
The following teams changed division since the 2025 season.

To JFL
▼ Relegated from J3 League
- Azul Claro Numazu
▲ Promoted from Regional Leagues
- J-Lease
- Vonds Ichihara

From JFL
▲ Promoted to J3 League
- Reilac Shiga
▼ Relegated to Regional Leagues
- Atletico Suzuka
- Asuka

=== Locations and stadiums ===
Locations of teams in the 2026–27 Japan Football League.

Team	Location	Stadium	Capacity	2025 season	Notes^{1}
Azul Claro Numazu^{↓}	Numazu	Ashitaka Park Stadium	10,000	20th in J3	J2 license holders
Briobecca Urayasu Ichikawa	Urayasu	Daiichi Cutter Field	2,100	3rd in JFL	
Criacao Shinjuku^{2}	Shinjuku	Ajinomoto Field Nishigaoka	7,258	12th in JFL	J3 license holders
Honda	Hamamatsu	Honda Miyakoda Soccer Stadium	2,506	1st in JFL	
Iwate Grulla Morioka	Morioka	Iwagin Stadium	9,892	9th in JFL	J1 license holders
J-Lease^{↑}	Ōita	Oita Athletic Stadium	15,943	1st in JRFCL	
Maruyasu Okazaki	Okazaki	Maruyasu Okazaki Ryuhoku Stadium	5,000	11th in JFL	
Minebea Mitsumi	Miyazaki	Hinata Stadium	20,000	10th in JFL	
Okinawa	Okinawa^{3}	Okinawa Athletic Park Stadium	12,270	8th in JFL	
ReinMeer Aomori	Aomori	Kakuhiro Group Athletic Stadium	20,809	5th in JFL	J3 license holders
Tiamo Hirakata	Hirakata	Tamayura Athletic Stadium	2,500	4th in JFL	
Veertien Mie	Tōin^{4}	La Pita Toin Stadium	5,077	7th in JFL	J3 license holders
Verspah Oita	Ōita^{5}	Resonac Soccer/Rugby Field	4,700	6th in JFL	J3 license holders
Vonds Ichihara^{2}^{↑}	Ichihara	ZA Oripri Stadium	14,051	2nd in JRFCL	
Yokogawa Musashino	Musashino	Musashino Municipal Athletic Stadium	5,188	14th in JFL	
YSCC Yokohama	Yokohama	NHK Spring Mitsuzawa Football Stadium	15,454	13th in JFL	J2 license holders

^{↓}	Relegated from the J3 League
^{↑}	Promoted from the Japanese Regional Leagues

Notes

1. The teams which possess (or are applicants of) promotion-enabling licenses are highlighted in green in the table.
2. Having J.League 100 Year Plan club status.
3. Also based at Tomigusuku and Uruma.
4. Mainly based at Kuwana and Yokkaichi.
5. Mainly based at Beppu and Yufu.

=== Personnel and kits ===
Note: Flags indicate national team as has been defined under FIFA eligibility rules. Players and coaches may hold more than one non-FIFA nationality.

Team	Manager	Captain	Kit manufacturer	Kit sponsors	
Team	Manager	Captain	Kit manufacturer	Main	Other(s)
Azul Claro Numazu	(Japan national football team) Norihisa Shimizu	(Japan national football team)	(Japan) Athleta	usui	List: Front: Meiden; Back: Suruga Bank, OKI; Sleeves: Mitsuboshi; Shorts: Kawata Construction
Briobecca Urayasu Ichikawa	(Japan national football team) Satoshi Tsunami	(Japan national football team)	(Japan) Jogarbola	Urata	List: Front: Claudio, Sanwa; Back: Manavis, Shoei; Sleeves: Univership Brokers, Urayasu, Ichikawa; Shorts: Kyoei, Lion Heart Clinic
Criacao Shinjuku	(Japan national football team) Hideaki Kitajima	(Japan national football team)	(Japan) MC Fashion	Assetlead	List: Front: Isetan; Back: SOMPO, Nichizei Group; Sleeves: Shinjuku; Shorts: None
Honda	(Japan national football team) Shota Itokazu	(Japan national football team)	(England) Umbro	Honda	List: Front: None; Back: Honda; Sleeves: Honda Cars; Shorts: None
Iwate Grulla Morioka	(Japan national football team) Kei Hoshikawa	(Japan national football team)	(England) Umbro	Nova	List: Front: Wiseman; Back: Palco Home; Sleeves: Iwate; Shorts: Ninomiya Clinic
J-Lease	(Japan national football team) Masaki Yanagawa	(Japan national football team)	(Germany) Puma	J-Lease	List: Front: Carebank, Kasuga Ryokka; Back: Medicare Otsuka, Kijima Kogen; Sleeves: Financial Design; Shorts: Oita Shiroya, Honda Cars Oita-Chuo
Maruyasu Okazaki	(Japan national football team) Hiroyasu Ibata	(Japan national football team)	(Japan) Athleta	Maruyasu	List: Front: Hoei; Back: Tokai Tokyo Securities, Meiji Yasuda Life; Sleeves: Hirotec Engineering; Shorts: None
Minebea Mitsumi	(Japan national football team) Hideaki Kitajima	(Japan national football team)	(England) Umbro	MinebeaMitsumi	List: Front: None; Back: None; Sleeves: None; Shorts: None
Okinawa	(Japan national football team) Rei Onogi	(Japan national football team)	(Japan)		List: Front: None; Back: None; Sleeves: None; Shorts: None
ReinMeer Aomori	(Japan national football team) Masato Harasaki	(Japan national football team)	(England) Umbro	Towa	List: Front: Kakuhiro, KBS; Back: Happy Drug, Nishidagumi; Sleeves: None; Shorts: None
Tiamo Hirakata	(Japan national football team) Takahiro Futagawa	(Japan national football team)	(Japan) Jogarbola	Izawa Towel	List: Front: Fukui, Himuro; Back: SCO Group, Zero Crest; Sleeves: Kakimaru; Shorts: None
Veertien Mie	(Japan national football team) Shuichi Mase	(Japan national football team)	(Japan) Tres	Daihatsu Mie	List: Front: San ju San Bank; Back: Shinnihon, Tado Green Farm; Sleeves: None; Shorts: Taki Shoun
Verspah Oita	(Japan national football team) Takashi Yamahashi	(Japan national football team)	(Japan) Yasuda	Hoyo	List: Front: Rilno, Kyoei; Back: Soitax Japan, Nver; Sleeves: Beppu, Yufu, Oita; Shorts: Axions
Vonds Ichihara	(Japan national football team) Seiya Mukoyama	(Japan national football team)	(Japan) Vinculum	Pulchra	List: Front: Sodick; Back: Juichi Sekken; Sleeves: Kominato Railway; Shorts: Ryokuyukai
Yokogawa Musashino	(Japan national football team) Hisayuki Ikegami	(Japan national football team)	(Germany) Puma	Yokogawa Electric	List: Front: Koshin Shoji; Back: Komoju, Edit Study; Sleeves: Musashi-Sakai Driving School; Shorts: Environmental Control Center
YSCC Yokohama	(Japan national football team) Tsuyoshi Omatsu	(Japan national football team)	(Brazil) Penalty	My Basket	List: Front: Remain In, Taiko; Back: Sanshin, YKA Dance Studio; Sleeves: Honmoku, Yokohama; Shorts: None

=== Managerial changes ===
==== Pre-season ====
Team	Outgoing head coach	Manner	Date of vacancy	Replaced by	Date of arrival
Azul Claro Numazu	(Japan) Hideto Suzuki	Resigned	16 December 2025	(Japan) Norihisa Shimizu	17 January 2026

==== During the season ====
Team	Outgoing	Manner	Exit date		Position in table	Incoming	Incoming date	
Team	Outgoing	Manner	Announced on	Departed on	Position in table	Incoming	Announced on	Arrived on

== Foreign players ==
Team	Player 1	Player 2	Player 3	Former players
Azul Claro Numazu	(South Korea) Baek In-hwan	(Spain) Enric Martínez		
Briobecca Urayasu Ichikawa				
Criacao Shinjuku				
Honda				
Iwate Grulla Morioka	(North Korea) Ryu Se-gun	(South Korea) Won Tae-rang		
J-Lease				
Maruyasu Okazaki	(South Korea) Yoo Seung-wan			
Minebea Mitsumi				
Okinawa	(South Korea) Park Se-gi	(United States) Elijah Whipp	(United States) Rylan Swanson	
ReinMeer Aomori	(South Korea) Park Kwan-gyu	(South Korea) Park Yong-ji		
Tiamo Hirakata	(Brazil) Felipe Sajioro	(South Korea) Cha Won-jun	(Venezuela) Ronaldo Rivas	
Veertien Mie				
Verspah Oita				
Vonds Ichihara	(South Korea) Park Gwang-hyeon			
Yokogawa Musashino				
YSCC Yokohama	(Brazil) Fábio Azevedo	(South Korea) Kim Min-woo		

=== Foreign players by confederation ===
Foreign players by confederation
AFC	North Korea (1), South Korea (9)
CAF	
CONCACAF	United States (2)
CONMEBOL	Brazil (2), Venezuela (1)
OFC	
UEFA	Spain (1)

== Standings ==
=== League table ===
Pos	Team	Pld	W	D	L	GF	GA	GD	Pts	Promotion, qualification or relegation
1	Criacao Shinjuku	9	7	1	1	11	5	+6	22	Promotion to J3 League (Note: Dependent on obtaining a J.League license.)
2	Verspah Oita	9	5	2	2	13	9	+4	17	Qualification for promotion playoff
3	Vonds Ichihara	9	5	2	2	12	8	+4	17	
4	Honda	9	5	2	2	10	8	+2	17	
5	ReinMeer Aomori	9	5	1	3	10	9	+1	16	
6	Okinawa	9	3	4	2	13	9	+4	13	
7	Azul Claro Numazu	8	3	4	1	11	8	+3	13	
8	Veertien Mie	9	4	1	4	14	12	+2	13	
9	YSCC Yokohama	9	4	1	4	15	16	−1	13	
10	J-Lease	8	3	2	3	12	8	+4	11	
11	Iwate Grulla Morioka	9	2	4	3	10	12	−2	10	
12	Briobecca Urayasu Ichikawa	9	3	1	5	12	15	−3	10	
13	Minebea Mitsumi	9	3	1	5	9	14	−5	10	
14	Maruyasu Okazaki	9	2	0	7	10	15	−5	6	
15	Tiamo Hirakata	8	1	2	5	8	18	−10	5	Relegation to Regional Leagues
16	Yokogawa Musashino	8	1	0	7	11	15	−4	3	Relegation to Regional Leagues

Updated to match(es) played on 25 October 2026. Source: Japan Football League
Rules for classification: 1) Points; 2) Goal difference; 3) Goals scored; 4) Head-to-head points; 5) Head-to-head goal difference; 6) Head-to-head goal scored; 7) Fair-play points.

=== Position by round ===
Team ╲ Round	1	2	3	4	5	6	7	8	9	10	11	12	13	14	15	16	17	18	19	20	21	22	23	24	25	26	27	28	29	30
Azul Claro Numazu	2	2	4	5	7	3	7	7	7																					
Briobecca Urayasu Ichikawa	10	12	13	14	15	15	15	13	12																					
Criacao Shinjuku	6	5	2	2	5	1	1	1	1	1																				
Honda	2	4	1	4	1	4	5	3	4																					
Iwate Grulla Morioka	8	11	12	10	12	13	12	11	11																					
J-Lease	10	12	14	15	14	14	13	12	10																					
Maruyasu Okazaki	10	8	9	12	11	11	11	14	14																					
Minebea Mitsumi	2	6	4	7	9	8	10	10	13																					
Okinawa	10	10	7	6	3	6	9	8	6																					
ReinMeer Aomori	8	7	8	8	4	2	4	2	5																					
Tiamo Hirakata	14	15	11	13	13	12	14	15	15																					
Veertien Mie	16	15	16	11	10	9	6	6	8																					
Verspah Oita	2	1	3	1	2	5	2	5	2																					
Vonds Ichihara	1	9	9	9	8	7	3	4	3																					
Yokogawa Musashino	14	12	14	16	16	16	16	16	16																					
YSCC Yokohama	6	2	6	3	6	10	8	9	9																					

Promotion to the J3 League
Qualification for the promotion play-off
Relegation to the Regional Leagues

Updated to match(es) played on 25 October 2026. Source: Japan Football League

== Results ==
=== Fixtures and results ===
Home \ Away	AZL	BRI	CRI	HON	GRU	JLE	MAR	MIM	OSV	REI	TIA	VEE	VRS	VND	YMS	YSC
Azul Claro Numazu																
Briobecca Urayasu Ichikawa																
Criacao Shinjuku																
Honda																
Iwate Grulla Morioka																
J-Lease																
Maruyasu Okazaki																
Minebea Mitsumi																
Okinawa																
ReinMeer Aomori																
Tiamo Hirakata																
Veertien Mie																
Verspah Oita																
Vonds Ichihara																
Yokogawa Musashino																
YSCC Yokohama																

First match(es) will be played: 29 August 2026. Source: Japan Football League
Legend: Blue = home team win; Yellow = draw; Red = away team win.
For upcoming matches, an "a" indicates there is an article about the rivalry between the two participants.

=== Results by round ===
Team ╲ Round	1	2	3	4	5	6	7	8	9	10	11	12	13	14	15	16	17	18	19	20	21	22	23	24	25	26	27	28	29	30
Azul Claro Numazu																														
Briobecca Urayasu Ichikawa																														
Criacao Shinjuku																														
Honda																														
Iwate Grulla Morioka																														
J-Lease																														
Maruyasu Okazaki																														
Minebea Mitsumi																														
Okinawa																														
ReinMeer Aomori																														
Tiamo Hirakata																														
Veertien Mie																														
Verspah Oita																														
Vonds Ichihara																														
Yokogawa Musashino																														
YSCC Yokohama																														

First match(es) will be played on 29 August 2026. Source: Japan Football League

== Attendances ==
=== Overall ===
Pos	Team	Total	High	Low	Average	Change
1	Azul Claro Numazu	0	0	0	0	n/a^{†}
2	Briobecca Urayasu Ichikawa	0	0	0	0	n/a
3	Criacao Shinjuku	0	0	0	0	n/a
4	Honda	0	0	0	0	n/a
5	Iwate Grulla Morioka	0	0	0	0	n/a
6	J-Lease	0	0	0	0	n/a^{‡}
7	Maruyasu Okazaki	0	0	0	0	n/a
8	Minebea Mitsumi	0	0	0	0	n/a
9	Okinawa	0	0	0	0	n/a
10	ReinMeer Aomori	0	0	0	0	n/a
11	Tiamo Hirakata	0	0	0	0	n/a
12	Veertien Mie	0	0	0	0	n/a
13	Verspah Oita	0	0	0	0	n/a
14	Vonds Ichihara	0	0	0	0	n/a^{‡}
15	Yokogawa Musashino	0	0	0	0	n/a
16	YSCC Yokohama	0	0	0	0	n/a
	League total	0	0	0	0	n/a

Source: Japan Football League
Notes:
^{†} Teams played previous season in J3 League
^{‡} Teams played previous season in Japanese Regional Leagues

=== Home match played ===
Team \ Match played	1	2	3	4	5	6	7	8	9	10	11	12	13	14	15	Total
Azul Claro Numazu																
Briobecca Urayasu Ichikawa																
Criacao Shinjuku																
Honda																
Iwate Grulla Morioka																
J-Lease																
Maruyasu Okazaki																
Minebea Mitsumi																
Okinawa																
ReinMeer Aomori																
Tiamo Hirakata																
Veertien Mie																
Verspah Oita																
Vonds Ichihara																
Yokogawa Musashino																
YSCC Yokohama																
League total																0

Source: Japan Football League

== Number of teams by prefecture ==
Number	Prefecture	Team(s)
2	Chiba Prefecture	Briobecca Urayasu Ichikawa and Vonds Ichihara
2	Ōita Prefecture	J-Lease and Verspah Oita
2	Shizuoka Prefecture	Azul Claro Numazu and Honda
2	Tokyo	Criacao Shinjuku and Yokogawa Musashino
1	Aichi Prefecture	Maruyasu Okazaki
1	Aomori Prefecture	ReinMeer Aomori
1	Iwate Prefecture	Iwate Grulla Morioka
1	Kanagawa Prefecture	YSCC Yokohama
1	Mie Prefecture	Veertien Mie
1	Miyazaki Prefecture	Minebea Mitsumi
1	Okinawa Prefecture	Okinawa
1	Osaka Prefecture	Tiamo Hirakata

== See also ==
- 2026 Japanese Super Cup
- 2026–27 Emperor's Cup
- 2026–27 J.League Cup
- 2026–27 J1 League
- 2026–27 J2 League
- 2026–27 J3 League
- 2026 Japanese Regional Leagues
