= Haruki Matsui =

Japanese footballer (born 2002)

Personal information
- Date of birth: 12 April 2002 (age 24)
- Place of birth: Nishinomiya, Hyōgo, Japan
- Height: 1.69 m (5 ft 7 in)
- Position: Midfielder

Team information
- Current team: Maruyasu Okazaki (on loan from FC Imabari)
- Number: 28

Youth career
- –2017: Nishinomiya SSS
- 2018–2020: Kobe Koryo Gakuen High School

Senior career*
Years	Team	Apps	(Gls)
2021–	FC Imabari	4	(0)
2023–	→ Maruyasu Okazaki (loan)	15	(0)
- * Club domestic league appearances and goals as of 17:04, 3 October 2021 (UTC)

Haruki Matsui (松井 治輝, Matsui Haruki; born 12 April 2002) is a Japanese footballer currently playing as a midfielder for Maruyasu Okazaki, on loan from FC Imabari.

== Club career ==
Born in Nishinomiya in the Hyōgo Prefecture of Japan, Matsui enrolled at the Kobe Koryo Gakuen High School, though struggled to establish himself in his junior year. In his senior year, he helped the high school to the third round of the 2020 All Japan High School Soccer Tournament, and was named as one of the thirty-nine most outstanding players of the competition.

He signed for professional club FC Imabari ahead of the 2021 season, expressing his desire to improve upon signing. Having featured fleetingly over the next two-and-a-half seasons, he was loaned to Japan Football League club Maruyasu Okazaki in September 2023. This deal was extended to the end of the following season in January 2024.

== Personal life ==
In October 2023, Matsui and Maruyasu Okazaki teammates Yusuke Murase and Masayuki Tokutake visited the Takane Elementary School to teach students footballing skills.

== Career statistics ==
=== Club ===
As of 27 October 2024.

Appearances and goals by club, season and competition
Club	Season	League			Cup		Other		Total	
Club	Season	Division	Apps	Goals	Apps	Goals	Apps	Goals	Apps	Goals
FC Imabari	2021	J3 League	2	0	0	0	0	0	2	0
FC Imabari	2022	J3 League	1	0	0	0	0	0	1	0
FC Imabari	2023	J3 League	1	0	1 (Note: Appearances in the Emperor's Cup)	0	0	0	2	0
FC Imabari	2024	J3 League	0	0	0	0	0	0	0	0
FC Imabari	Total		4	0	1	0	0	0	5	0
Maruyasu Okazaki (loan)	2023	JFL	4	0	0	0	0	0	4	0
Maruyasu Okazaki (loan)	2024	JFL	11	0	0	0	0	0	11	0
Maruyasu Okazaki (loan)	Total		15	0	0	0	0	0	15	0
Career total			19	0	1	0	0	0	20	0
