= 2025 Japan Football League =

Japan Football League for 2025

Japan Football League
- Season: 2025
- Dates: 8 March – 23 November 2025
- Champions: Honda FC
- Promoted: Reilac Shiga FC
- Relegated: Atletico Suzuka; Asuka FC
- Matches: 240
- Goals: 596 (2.48 per match)

The 2025 Japan Football League (Japanese: 第27回日本フットボールリーグ[第27回 JFL 2025], Hepburn: Dai Nijūnana Nihon Futtobōru Rīgu [Dai Nijūnana JFL 2025]) was the 27th season of JFL, since its establishment in 1999. This was also the twelfth season in which the league operated as the fourth tier of Japanese football.

== Overview ==
This marked the final Japan Football League season to be played within a single calendar year, running from March to November, as future seasons would shift to a summer-to-spring format.

The number of teams stayed the same at 16 for the 2025 season, just as it was in 2024.

Under league regulations, the champion was eligible for automatic promotion to the J3 League, while the runner-up was eligible to compete in a promotion/relegation play-off

As league champions, Honda FC were ineligible for promotion because the club does not participate in the J.League licensing system. This meant only the second-place team, Reilac Shiga, qualified for the promotion/relegation play-off, where they faced Azul Claro Numazu.

== Schedule ==
The league and match format was revealed on 21 December 2024. The season kicked off on 8 March and wrapped up on 23 November. The format consists of a round-robin with 30 matches.

The J3/JFL play-offs were held over two legs, with the dates confirmed in December.

== Changes from the previous season ==
Iwate Grulla Morioka and YSCC Yokohama were relegated from the 2024 J3 League after finishing 19th and 20th, respectively. Iwate played in the JFL for the first time in their history for this season while YSCC Yokohama returned to the fourth tier after 12 years' absence.

Asuka FC, 2024 Kansai Soccer League Division 1 champion, was the sole promoted team to the JFL as they won the 2024 Regional Champions League. Asuka also played in the JFL for the first time in their history for this season.

Vonds Ichihara could have joined Briobecca Urayasu as Chiba's representatives in the JFL, had they won the 2024 JFL play-off against Minebea Mitsumi.

Sony Sendai withdrew from the JFL due to dissolution after financial troubles and ended 25 years in the fourth tier.

On 1 January 2025, Briobecca Urayasu was renamed Briobecca Urayasu Ichikawa for this season due to aiming for the J.League.

== Participating clubs ==
The teams which possess (or are applicants of) promotion-enabling licenses are highlighted in green in the following table.

Locations of the 2026–27 Japan Football League teams
Kansai Region Japan Football League Teams
Tokyo City Area Japan Football League Teams

Club name	Home town	Stadium	Capacity	Position	Notes
Asuka FC	Kashihara, Nara	Nara Prefectural Kashihara Park Athletics Stadium	5,000	JRCL (1st)	
Atletico Suzuka	Suzuka, Mie	AGF Suzuka Athletic Stadium	1,450	11th	
Briobecca Urayasu Ichikawa	Urayasu, Chiba	Daiichi Cutter Field	2,100	8th	
Criacao Shinjuku	Shinjuku-ku, Tokyo	Ajinomoto Field Nishigaoka	7,258	14th	100 Year Plan status J3 license holders
Honda FC	Hamamatsu, Shizuoka	Honda Miyakoda Soccer Stadium	2,506	7th	
Iwate Grulla Morioka	Morioka, Iwate	Iwagin Stadium	9,892	J3 (20th)	J1 license holders
Maruyasu Okazaki	Okazaki, Aichi	Maruyasu Okazaki Ryuhoku Stadium	5,000	13th	
Minebea Mitsumi	Miyazaki, Miyazaki	Hinata Athletic Stadium	20,000	16th	
Okinawa SV	All cities/towns in Okinawa (Note: centering on Tomigusuku, Uruma, and Okinawa)	Tapic Kenso Hiyagon Stadium	10,189	9th	
Reilac Shiga	Kusatsu, Shiga	Heiwado HATO Stadium	15,000	4th	100 Year Plan status applicants J3 license holders
ReinMeer Aomori	Aomori, Aomori	Kakuhiro Group Athletic Stadium	20,809	10th	J3 license holders
Tiamo Hirakata	Hirakata, Osaka	Tamayura Athletic Stadium	2,500	3rd	
Veertien Mie	All cities/towns in Mie (Note: centering on Kuwana & Yokkaichi)	La Pita Toin Stadium	5,077	5th	J3 license holders
Verspah Oita	Yufu, Beppu & Ōita, Ōita	Resonac Soccer/Rugby Field	4,700	6th	J3 license holders
Yokogawa Musashino	Musashino, Tokyo	Musashino Municipal Athletic Stadium	5,188	15th	
YSCC Yokohama	Yokohama, Kanagawa	Nippatsu Mitsuzawa Stadium	15,454	J3 (19th)	J2 license holders

=== Personnel and kits ===
Club	Manager	Kit manufacturer	Main shirt sponsor
Asuka FC	(Japan) Naohiko Minobe	(Japan) Squadra	Maru Industry
Atletico Suzuka	(Japan) Fujio Yamamoto	(Brazil) Athleta	Topia
Briobecca Urayasu Ichikawa	(Japan) Satoshi Tsunami	(Japan) soccer junky	Urata
Criacao Shinjuku	(Japan) Hideaki Kitajima	(Japan) Mitsubishi Fashion	Assetlead
Honda FC	(Japan) Shota Itokazu	(England) Umbro	Honda
Iwate Grulla Morioka	(Japan) Kei Hoshikawa	(Spain) Kelme	Nova
Maruyasu Okazaki	(Japan) Hiroyasu Ibata	(Brazil) Athleta	Maruyasu
Minebea Mitsumi	(Japan) Yōsuke Miyaji	(England) Umbro	MinebeaMitsumi
Okinawa SV	(Japan) Rei Onogi	(Japan) XF	Nescafé
Reilac Shiga	(Japan) Makoto Kakuda	(Japan) DEZ	Rei Beauty; Dermatology Clinic
ReinMeer Aomori	(Japan) Masato Harasaki	(England) Umbro	Towa
Tiamo Hirakata	(Japan) Takahiro Futagawa	(Japan) Jogarbola	Izawa Towel
Veertien Mie	(Japan) Shuichi Mase	(Japan) Sfida	Cosmo Oil
Verspah Oita	(Japan) Gen Nakamura	(Japan) Yasuda	Hoyo Group
Yokogawa Musashino	(Japan) Takanori Kanamori	(Germany) Puma	Yokogawa Electric
YSCC Yokohama	(Japan) Tsuyoshi Omatsu	(Brazil) Penalty	My Basket

=== Managerial changes ===
Team	Outgoing	Manner	Exit date		Position in table	Incoming	Incoming date		Ref.
Team	Outgoing	Manner	Announced on	Departed on	Position in table	Incoming	Announced on	Arrived on	Ref.
YSCC Yokohama	Hiroaki Nagamine	Contract terminated	11 July 2025	10 July 2025	13th	Yuya Shiga (Interim)	11 July 2025	10 July 2025	
YSCC Yokohama	Yuya Shiga (Interim)	Full time coach appointed	17 July 2025	17 July 2025	14th	Tsuyoshi Omatsu	17 July 2025	17 July 2025	

=== Foreign players ===
Club	Player 1	Player 2	Player 3	Player 4	Former players
Asuka FC					
Atletico Suzuka	(Brazil) Diego Washington	(Ghana) Mohammed Lamine			
Briobecca Urayasu Ichikawa					
Criacao Shinjuku					
Honda FC					
Iwate Grulla Morioka	(Brazil) Sillas	(Haiti) Cédric Toussaint	(South Korea) Ryu Se-gun	(South Korea) Won Tae-rang	(South Korea) Kim Sung-kon
Maruyasu Okazaki					
Minebea Mitsumi					
Okinawa SV					
Reilac Shiga					
ReinMeer Aomori	(Brazil) Arthur Bessa	(Brazil) Luiz Fernando	(South Korea) Han Yong-gi	(South Korea) Park Yong-ji	
Tiamo Hirakata	(South Korea) Kim Sung-kon	(Thailand) Thanakrit Laorkai			(South Korea) Kim Ji-myung (Thailand) Thitipat Ekarunpong
Veertien Mie	(North Korea) Kim Song-sun	(North Korea) Ryang Hyon-ju			
Verspah Oita					
Yokogawa Musashino	(South Korea) Kim Tae-uk	(South Korea) Park Kwan-gyu			
YSCC Yokohama	(Nigeria) Onye Ogochukwu	(South Korea) Kim Yong-u	(South Korea) Park Si-eon		(South Korea) Lee Yoon-sung

== League table ==
Pos	Team	Pld	W	D	L	GF	GA	GD	Pts	Promotion, qualification or relegation
1	Honda FC (C)	30	17	9	4	51	28	+23	60	
2	Reilac Shiga (O, P)	30	16	8	6	47	35	+12	56	Qualification for promotion playoffs
3	Briobecca Urayasu Ichikawa	30	14	10	6	35	25	+10	52	
4	Tiamo Hirakata	30	15	5	10	58	42	+16	50	
5	ReinMeer Aomori	30	14	8	8	40	33	+7	50	
6	Verspah Oita	30	14	7	9	41	33	+8	49	
7	Veertien Mie	30	11	12	7	38	25	+13	45	
8	Okinawa SV	30	12	7	11	39	41	−2	43	
9	Iwate Grulla Morioka	30	11	6	13	45	49	−4	39	
10	Minebea Mitsumi	30	9	7	14	40	41	−1	34	
11	Maruyasu Okazaki	30	9	7	14	29	38	−9	34	
12	Criacao Shinjuku	30	8	9	13	29	34	−5	33	
13	YSCC Yokohama	30	8	6	16	35	56	−21	30	
14	Yokogawa Musashino	30	7	8	15	17	37	−20	29	
15	Atletico Suzuka (R)	30	7	7	16	30	46	−16	28	Qualified for relegation playoffs
16	Asuka FC (R)	30	4	12	14	22	33	−11	24	Relegation to 2026–27 Japanese Regional Leagues

Source: Japan Football League
Rules for classification: 1) Points; 2) Goal difference; 3) Goals scored; 4) Head-to-head points; 5) Head-to-head goal difference; 6) Head-to-head goal scored; 7) Fair-play points.
(C) Champions; (O) Play-off winners; (P) Promoted; (R) Relegated

== J3/JFL Play-offs ==
The play-offs, officially called the 2025 J3/JFL Play-offs (Japanese: 2025 J3・JFL入れ替え戦 (Note: The logo and signage say 2025 J.League J3・JFL入れ替え戦)), took place on 7 and 14 December 2025. If the two teams had been level after 180 minutes, the second match would have gone to extra time and penalties if required. The away goals rule wouldn't be in effect.

=== Overview ===
Team 1	Agg.	Team 2	1st leg	2nd leg
Reilac Shiga (JFL)	4 - 3	Azul Claro Numazu (J3)	3 – 2	1 - 1

=== Matches ===
7 December 2025
13:00 JST

Reilac Shiga	3–2	Azul Claro Numazu

Heiwado HATO Stadium, Hikone, Shiga Prefecture
Attendance: 9,006
Referee: Tomohiro Inoue
14 December 2025
14:00 JST

Azul Claro Numazu	1–1	Reilac Shiga

Ashitaka Park Stadium, Numazu, Shizuoka Prefecture
Attendance: 8,255
Referee: Tetsuro Yoshida

== JFL/Regional Leagues promotion/relegation playoff ==
The play-off (Japanese: 2025年度JFL·地域入れ替え戦) took place on 30 November 2025.

30 November 2025
13:00 (JST)

Atletico Suzuka (2025 JFL 15th)	0–1 (a.e.t.)	Vonds Ichihara (2025 JRFCL runners-up)
	Match report (in Japanese)	Kato 98'

Mie Suzuka Sports Garden, Suzuka, Mie
Attendance: 1,589
Referee: Yoshihito Hori

Atletico Suzuka relegated to the Tōkai Soccer League Division 1; Vonds Ichihara promoted to the JFL.

== See also ==
- 2025 Japanese Super Cup
- 2025 Emperor's Cup
- 2025 J.League Cup
- 2025 J1 League
- 2025 J2 League
- 2025 J3 League
- 2025 Japanese Regional Football Champions League
- 2025 Japanese Regional Leagues
