= 2020 Japan Football League =

Japan Football League
- Season: 2020
- Dates: July 18 – November 28
- Champions: Verspah Oita
- Promoted: Tegevajaro Miyazaki
- Relegated: none (for season 2020 only)
- Matches: 120
- Goals: 330 (2.75 per match)
- Top goalscorer: Tatsuma Sakai (Matsue City); Kazuki Sakamoto (MIO Biwako Shiga); 9 goals
- Highest attendance: Tegevajaro Miyazaki v Iwaki FC; 2,203; (Nov. 29, 2020)
- Lowest attendance: 23 games played with zero attendance due to Covid-19
- Average attendance: 442

The 2020 Japan Football League (Japanese: 第22回日本フットボールリーグ[第22回 JFL 2020], Hepburn: Dai Nijūnikai Nihon Futtobōru Rīgu [Dai Nijūnikai JFL 2020]) was the seventh season of the nationwide fourth tier of Japanese football, and the 22nd season since the establishment of Japan Football League.

== Postponement of the beginning of the season ==
On February 27, the opening game and match day 2 were postponed in response to the COVID-19 pandemic.

On March 16, it was announced match day 3 would be postponed. On March 25, it was announced Match day 4, Match day 5 would be postponed.

On April 7, it was announced Match day 6 would also be postponed.

On April 15 it was finally decided that only the second half of the season would be played beginning on the scheduled date, July 18. No relegations happened and the winners and runners-up of the Japanese Regional Series were automatically promoted, meaning that the 2021 season would be held with 17 clubs.

On June 24, the JFL announced new dates. The league match for this season started on July 18. Match days 16 and 17, and each home game opening game were held as a without spectator match.

== Clubs ==
JFL map 2020
JFL 2020 teams in Keihanshin

Sixteen clubs featured in this season of Japan Football League. There were some changes: FC Imabari got promoted to J3, after finishing third in 2019, while Ryutsu Keizai Dragons was relegated after playing for five seasons at this level. Matsue City FC, who finished second-last place, were fated to go back to Japanese Regional Leagues as well, but avoided the drop thanks to FC Imabari going up to J3 League.

There are two new clubs in the JFL, debuting at this level after finishing in the top two in the 2019 Japanese Regional Series: Iwaki FC dominated the final stage, while Kochi United SC overcame the other two teams – Ococias Kyoto AC and Fukui United FC – to get the final spot for this seasons JFL.

Club name	Home town	Position	Notes
Honda FC	Hamamatsu, Shizuoka	1st	2019 Champions
Honda Lock	Miyazaki, Miyazaki	6th	
Iwaki FC	Iwaki, Fukushima	RPS 1st	Winners of TSL and 43rd RPS, 100 Year Plan-status and J3 license holders
Kochi United SC	Kōchi, Kōchi	RPS 2nd	Winners of SSL and runners-up of 43rd RPS
Maruyasu Okazaki	Okazaki, Aichi	11th	
Matsue City FC	Matsue, Shimane	15th	
MIO Biwako Shiga	Kusatsu, Shiga	9th	Applied for 100 Year Plan-status
Nara Club	All cities/towns in Nara (Note: centering on Nara)	14th	100 Year Plan-status and J3 license holders
FC Osaka	Higashiōsaka, Osaka	8th	100 Year Plan-status and J3 license holders
ReinMeer Aomori	Aomori, Aomori	13th	100 Year Plan-status and J3 license holders
Sony Sendai	Tagajō, Miyagi	2nd	
Suzuka Point Getters	Suzuka, Mie	12th	Applied for 100 Year Plan-status
Tegevajaro Miyazaki	Miyazaki & Shintomi, Miyazaki	5th	100 Year Plan-status and J3 license holders
Tokyo Musashino City	Musashino, Tokyo	4th	No more 100 Year Plan-status, withdrew J3 license
Veertien Mie	All cities/towns in Mie (Note: centering on Kuwana & Yokkaichi)	10th	100 Year Plan-status and J3 license holders
Verspah Oita	Yufu & Ōita, Ōita	7th	

=== Personnel and kits ===
Club	Manager	Captain	Kit manufacturer
Honda FC	(Japan) Hiroyasu Ibata	(Japan) Yuya Suzuki	(England) Umbro
Honda Lock SC	(Japan) Shinya Shirakawa	(Japan) Naoya Oyama	(Italy) Kappa
Iwaki FC	(Japan) Yuzo Tamura	(Japan) Masaru Hidaka	(United States) Under Armour
Kochi United SC	(Japan) Akihiro Nishimura	(Japan) Tsubasa Yokotake	(Japan) bonera
Maruyasu Okazaki	(Japan) Ryuji Kitamura	(Japan) Teruyuki Moniwa	(Brazil) ATHLETA
Matsue City FC	(Japan) Noriaki Sanenobu	(Japan) Yuzuru Tabira	(Japan) GAViC
MIO Biwako Shiga	(Japan) Hiroshi Otsuki	(Japan) Ryo Nishiguchi	(Japan) JOGARBOLA
Nara Club	(Japan) Maiki Hayashi	(Japan) Shinichi Mukai	(Japan) SQUADRA
FC Osaka	(Japan) Shinya Tsukahara	(Japan) Tomoyuki Iwamoto	(Japan) bonera
ReinMeer Aomori	(Japan) Tatsuya Mochizuki	(Japan) Kanta Takahashi	(England) Umbro
Sony Sendai FC	(Japan) Gen Nakamura	(Japan) Kenta Ogihara	(England) Umbro
Suzuka Point Getters	(Spain) Milagros Martínez Domínguez	(Japan) Kohei Fujita	(Brazil) ATHLETA
Tegevajaro Miyazaki	(Japan) Keiji Kuraishi	(Japan) Kenta Ishii	(Brazil) Penalty
Tokyo Musashino City	(Japan) Hisayuki Ikegami	(Japan) Koji Ishihara	(Japan) Yonex
Veertien Mie	(Japan) Nobuhiro Ueno	(Japan) Hitoshi Nishimura	(Germany) Puma
Verspah Oita	(Japan) Shigemitsu Sudo	(Japan) Kosei Uryu	(Japan) YASUDA

== League table ==
Pos	Team	Pld	W	D	L	GF	GA	GD	Pts	Promotion
1	Verspah Oita (C)	15	10	2	3	27	16	+11	32	
2	**Tegevajaro Miyazaki** (P)	15	8	4	3	26	15	+11	28	Promotion to 2021 J3 League (Note: To qualify for promotion, a club must hold a 100 Year Plan status, obtain J3 license (marked in bold in the table), and finish both in the top 4 of the JFL, and either 1st or 2nd among the promotion-eligible clubs.)
3	Sony Sendai	15	8	2	5	25	22	+3	26	
4	Honda FC	15	5	7	3	20	12	+8	22	
5	Suzuka Point Getters	15	6	3	6	23	19	+4	21	
6	**Veertien Mie**	15	6	3	6	17	16	+1	21	
7	**Iwaki FC**	15	6	3	6	24	24	0	21	
8	**FC Osaka**	15	6	2	7	24	24	0	20	
9	MIO Biwako Shiga	15	6	2	7	23	27	−4	20	
10	Matsue City FC	15	6	2	7	18	24	−6	20	
11	Tokyo Musashino City	15	5	4	6	15	17	−2	19	
12	Honda Lock	15	5	4	6	19	25	−6	19	
13	**Nara Club**	15	5	3	7	21	21	0	18	
14	Kochi United SC	15	4	4	7	17	20	−3	16	
15	**ReinMeer Aomori**	15	4	4	7	17	26	−9	16	
16	Maruyasu Okazaki	15	4	3	8	14	22	−8	15	

Source: JFL website (in Japanese)
Rules for classification: 1) Points; 2) Goal difference; 3) Head-to-head results; 4) Goals scored; 5) Disciplinary points; 6) Number of wins; 7) Lottery
(C) Champions; (P) Promoted

== Top scorers ==
As of matches played November 29, 2020.

Rank	Player	Club	Goals
1	(Japan) Tatsuma Sakai	Matsue City FC	9
1	(Japan) Kazuki Sakamoto	MIO Biwako Shiga	9
3	(Japan) Motoki Fujiwara	Sony Sendai FC	7
3	(Japan) Jin Shioya	Veertien Mie	7
5	(Japan) Shoma Mizunaga	Tegevajaro Miyazaki	6
5	(Japan) Kaima Akahoshi	Kochi United SC	6
7	8 players		5

== Promotion and relegation ==
Despite the JFL announcing that there would be no promotion or relegation of clubs, the J. League agreed to admit Tegevajaro Miyazaki to the J3 League on November 24, 2020, after Miyazaki finished in the top four positions. Miyazaki ultimately finished runners-up.

FC Tiamo Hirakata and FC Kariya were promoted from the Regional Leagues as Regional Promotion Series champions and runners-up respectively. Kariya returned to the JFL after being relegated back in 2009.

== Attendances ==
Pos	Team	Total	High	Low	Average	Change
1	FC Osaka	2,846	993	0	712	−35.2%
2	Honda FC	2,054	941	0	411	−49.8%
3	Honda Lock	800	272	0	200	−42.0%
4	Iwaki FC	9,005	1,828	0	1,286	n/a
5	Kochi United SC	4,741	1,151	0	677	n/a
6	Maruyasu Okazaki	716	170	0	143	−63.0%
7	Matsue City FC	3,934	971	0	656	−6.2%
8	MIO Biwako Shiga	2,479	832	0	413	−19.3%
9	Nara Club	3,685	959	0	614	−69.6%
10	ReinMeer Aomori	2,429	726	0	405	−21.1%
11	Sony Sendai FC	1,249	303	0	178	−62.0%
12	Suzuka Point Getters	1,965	413	0	281	−49.2%
13	Tegevajaro Miyazaki	4,698	2,203	0	671	+66.5%
14	Tokyo Musashino City	3,658	907	0	610	−65.9%
15	Veertien Mie	6,476	1,741	0	925	−11.1%
16	Verspah Oita	1,531	509	0	306	−47.4%
	League total	52,266	2,203	0	436	−53.6%

Updated to games played on 29/11/2020
Source: JFL

23 games played with no spectators due to COVID-19 worldwide pandemic

== See also ==
- Japan Football Association (JFA)
- J.League
- 2020 J1 League (I)
- 2020 J2 League (II)
- 2020 J3 League (III)
- 2020 Japanese Regional Leagues (V/VI)
- 2020 Fuji Xerox Super Cup (Super Cup)
- 2020 Emperor's Cup (National Cup)
- 2020 J.League YBC Levain Cup (League Cup)
