= 2024 Japan Football League =

Japan Football League for 2024

Japan Football League
- Season: 2024
- Dates: 10 March – 24 November
- Champions: Tochigi City
- Promoted: Tochigi City; Kochi United
- Relegated: Sony Sendai (withdrawn)
- Matches: 240
- Goals: 606 (2.53 per match)
- Top goalscorer: Kakeru Aoto (15 goals)
- Biggest home win: Tochigi City 6–0 Atletico Suzuka (17 November)
- Biggest away win: Reilac Shiga 0–5 Veertien Mie (24 November)
- Highest scoring: Tochigi City 5–3 Minebea Mitsumi (12 October)
- Highest attendance: 16,480; Criacao Shinjuku 1–4 Tiamo Hirakata (7 June)
- Lowest attendance: 108; Maruyasu Okazaki 2–2 Tiamo Hirakata (2 October)
- Total attendance: 296,198
- Average attendance: 1,234
- All statistics correct as of 24 November 2024.

The 2024 Japan Football League (Japanese: 第26回日本フットボールリーグ[第26回 JFL 2024], Hepburn: Dai Nijūrokkai Nihon Futtobōru Rīgu [Dai Nijūrokkai JFL 2024]) was the eleventh season having a fourth-tier status in Japanese football and the 26th season since the establishment of the Japan Football League.

== Overview ==
=== Promoted from the JFL to the J3 League ===
No team was promoted from the JFL to the J3, since none of the top four clubs last season met the needed requirements for promotion, which includes (but not limited to) having a J3 license.

=== Promoted from the Regional Leagues ===
Tochigi City, 2023 Kanto Soccer League runner-up, was the sole promoted team to the JFL as they won the 2023 Regional Champions League.

Vonds Ichihara could join Briobecca Urayasu as Chiba's representatives in the JFL, had they won the 2023 JFL play-off against Okinawa SV.

=== Promotion and relegation between J3 and JFL ===
This season is the second to feature promotion/relegation between the J3 League and the Japan Football League, enabling the possibility for teams to be relegated from the J3. The system of promotion/relegation between the leagues can be determined by the eligibility (Promotion to J3 requires a J.League license) of the JFL's champions and runners-up for the season.

No changes were made from the previous season:

- If only the JFL champion holds a license, there will be automatic promotion/relegation with the J3's 20th-placed team.
- If only the JFL runner-up holds a license, there will be promotion/relegation play-offs with the J3's 20th-placed team.
- If both the JFL champion and runner-up hold a license, there will be automatic promotion/relegation between the JFL champions and the J3's 20th-placed team, and promotion/relegation play-offs with the J3's 19th-placed team.
- If neither the JFL champion nor the runner-up holds a license, no promotion/relegation between J3 and JFL will take place.
- In addition, the J.League stated extra requisites for promotions, with teams needing to have an average attendance of at least 2,000 in home matches, and an annual admission revenue of at least 10 million yen.

The dates and the host teams of the promotion/relegation play-off were pre-determined by the J.League. In case it happens: It will be played in two legs on 1 and 7 December, with the J3 team hosting the second leg; away-goals rule will not be applied; should the match be tied, it will require extra-time, and if the draw persists, penalty shoot-outs.

=== Promotion and relegation between JFL and Regional Leagues ===
- The winner of the 2024 Regional Champions League (JFL promotion series) will be automatically promoted for the 2024 JFL.
- The 15th-placed team from the JFL will play a play-off match against the runners-up of the promotion series, with the winner earning a spot at the 2025 JFL. It will be held on 30 November or 1 December, at a stadium picked by the host team from the JFL.
- The 16th-placed team will be automatically relegated to their respective Regional League.

=== Club name changes ===
Tokyo Musashino United FC returned to its former name Yokogawa Musashino FC, and Suzuka Point Getters became Atletico Suzuka Club.

== Participating clubs ==
The teams which possess (or are applicants of) promotion-enabler licenses are highlighted in green in the following table.

Club name	Home town	Stadium	Capacity	Position	Notes
ReinMeer Aomori	Aomori, Aomori	Kakuhiro Group Athletic Stadium	20,809	JFL (5th)	J3 license holders
Sony Sendai	Tagajō, Miyagi	Miyagi Co-op Megumino Soccer Field	10,000	JFL (4th)	
Briobecca Urayasu	Urayasu, Chiba	Kashiwanoha Stadium	2,100	JFL (2nd)	
Criacao Shinjuku	Shinjuku-ku, Tokyo	Ajinomoto Field Nishigaoka	7,258	JFL (11th)	100 Year Plan status J3 license holders
Yokogawa Musashino	Musashino, Tokyo	Musashino Municipal Athletic Stadium	5,188	JFL (13th)	
Tochigi City	Tochigi, Tochigi	City Football Station	5,085	JRCL (1st)	J3 license holders
Honda FC	Hamamatsu, Shizuoka	Honda Miyakoda Soccer Stadium	2,506	JFL (1st)	
Maruyasu Okazaki	Okazaki, Aichi	Maruyasu Okazaki Ryuhoku Stadium	5,000	JFL (8th)	
Atletico Suzuka	Suzuka, Mie	AGF Suzuka Athletic Stadium	1,450	JFL (9th)	
Veertien Mie	All cities/towns in Mie (Note: centering on Kuwana & Yokkaichi)	La Pita Toin Stadium	5,077	JFL (10th)	J3 license holders
Tiamo Hirakata	Hirakata, Osaka	Tamayura Athletic Stadium	2,500	JFL (12th)	
Reilac Shiga	Kusatsu, Shiga	Heiwado HATO Stadium	15,000	JFL (3rd)	100 Year Plan status applicants J3 license holders
Kochi United	Kōchi, Kōchi	Kōchi Haruno Athletic Stadium	25,000	JFL (7th)	J3 license holders
Verspah Oita	Yufu, Beppu & Ōita, Ōita	Resonac Soccer/Rugby Field	4,700	JFL (6th)	J3 license holders
Minebea Mitsumi	Miyazaki, Miyazaki	Hinata Athletic Stadium	20,000	JFL (14th)	
Okinawa SV	All cities/towns in Okinawa (Note: centering on Tomigusuku, Uruma, and Okinawa)	Tapic Kenso Hiyagon Stadium	10,189	JFL (15th)	

=== Personnel and kits ===
Club	Manager	Kit manufacturer	Main shirt sponsor
ReinMeer Aomori	(Japan) Kei Shibata	(England) Umbro	Towa
Sony Sendai	(Japan) Jun Suzuki	(Germany) Adidas	Sony
Briobecca Urayasu	(Japan) Satoshi Tsunami	(Japan) soccer junky	Urata
Criacao Shinjuku	(Japan) Hideaki Kitajima	(Japan) Mitsubishi Fashion	Assetlead
Yokogawa Musashino	(Japan) Toshiyuki Ikegami	(Germany) Puma	Yokogawa Electric
Tochigi City	(Japan) Naoki Imaya	(Japan) Luxperior	Nippon Rika
Honda FC	(Japan) Hidekazu Kobayashi	(England) Umbro	Honda
Maruyasu Okazaki	(Japan) Hiroyasu Ibata	(Brazil) Athleta	Maruyasu
Atletico Suzuka	(South Korea) Park Kang-jo	(Brazil) Athleta	Topia
Veertien Mie	(Japan) Shuichi Mase	(Japan) Sfida	Cosmo Oil
Tiamo Hirakata	(Japan) Takahiro Futagawa	(Japan) Jogarbola	Izawa Towel
Reilac Shiga	(Japan) Makoto Kakuda	(Japan) DEZ	Rei Beauty; Dermatology Clinic
Kochi United	(Japan) Takafumi Yoshimoto	(Brazil) Athleta	None
Verspah Oita	(Japan) Takashi Yamahashi	(Japan) Yasuda	Hoyo Group
Minebea Mitsumi	(Japan) Yosuke Miyaji	(England) Umbro	MinebeaMitsumi
Okinawa SV	(Japan) Rei Onogi	(Japan) XF	Nescafé

=== Managerial changes ===
Team	Outgoing	Manner	Exit date		Position in table	Incoming	Incoming date		Ref.
Team	Outgoing	Manner	Announced on	Departed on	Position in table	Incoming	Announced on	Arrived on	Ref.
Atletico Suzuka	(Japan) Noboru Saito	Role change	30 June 2024		10th	(South Korea) Park Kang-jo	1 July 2024		
Reilac Shiga	(Japan) Kikuchi Toshizo	Sacked	15 July 2024		9th	(Japan) Hiroki Asuma (Interim)	21 July 2024		
Reilac Shiga	(Japan) Hiroki Asuma (Interim)	Appointment of permanent coach	31 July 2024		9th	(Japan) Makoto Kakuda	31 July 2024		
Yokogawa Musashino	(Japan) Toshihori Ishimura	Appointment of new head coach	12 September 2024		15th	(Japan) Toshiyuki Ikegami	12 September 2024		

== Foreign players ==
Club	Player 1	Player 2	Player 3	Player 4	Former players
ReinMeer Aomori	(Brazil) Arthur Bessa	(Brazil) Luiz Fernando	(Brazil) Vinícius	(North Korea) Han Yong-gi	(Brazil) Eduardo
Sony Sendai					
Briobecca Urayasu					
Criacao Shinjuku	(North Korea) Hwang Song-su				
Yokogawa Musashino					
Tochigi City	(Brazil) Carlos Eduardo	(Brazil) Pedro Henrique			
Honda FC					
Maruyasu Okazaki	(Senegal) Talla Ndao				
Atletico Suzuka	(Brazil) Diego Washington	(Ghana) Mohammed Lamine	(South Korea) Choi Se-yun		
Veertien Mie	(North Korea) Kim Song-sun	(North Korea) Ryang Hyon-ju			
Tiamo Hirakata	(Brazil) Felipe Baessa	(Brazil) Willian	(Nigeria) Emeka Basil	(South Korea) Park Kwang-gyu	
Reilac Shiga	(Peru) Frank Romero				
Kochi United	(South Korea) Park Jong-seok				
Verspah Oita					
Minebea Mitsumi					
Okinawa SV					

== League table ==
Pos	Team	Pld	W	D	L	GF	GA	GD	Pts	Promotion, qualification or relegation
1	Tochigi City (C, P)	30	19	7	4	66	35	+31	64	Promotion to 2025 J3 League
2	Kochi United (O, P)	30	16	7	7	36	22	+14	55	Qualification for promotion playoffs
3	Tiamo Hirakata	30	15	5	10	49	45	+4	50	
4	Reilac Shiga	30	14	6	10	47	32	+15	48	
5	Veertien Mie	30	13	9	8	41	33	+8	48	
6	Verspah Oita	30	11	12	7	37	37	0	45	
7	Honda FC	30	11	10	9	34	27	+7	43	
8	Briobecca Urayasu	30	12	6	12	39	36	+3	42	
9	Okinawa SV	30	11	8	11	52	44	+8	41	
10	ReinMeer Aomori	30	9	14	7	32	26	+6	41	
11	Atletico Suzuka	30	10	7	13	39	42	−3	37	
12	Sony Sendai	30	10	7	13	34	40	−6	37	Disbanded after the season
13	Maruyasu Okazaki	30	6	12	12	30	39	−9	30	
14	Criacao Shinjuku	30	5	11	14	19	44	−25	26	
15	Yokogawa Musashino	30	5	8	17	26	56	−30	23	
16	Minebea Mitsumi (O)	30	5	7	18	25	48	−23	22	Qualification for relegation playoffs

Source: Japan Football League Soccerway
Rules for classification: 1) Points; 2) Goal difference; 3) Goals scored; 4) Head-to-head points; 5) Head-to-head goal difference; 6) Head-to-head goal scored; 7) Fair-play points.
(C) Champions; (O) Play-off winners; (P) Promoted

== J3/JFL Play-offs ==
The play-offs, officially called the 2024 J3/JFL Play-offs (Japanese: 2024 J3・JFL入れ替え戦 (Note: The logo and signage reads 2024 J.League J3・JFL入れ替え戦)), took place on 1 and 7 December 2024. If the two teams were equal on the scoreboard, the match would go to extra time and penalties. Away goals rule would not be applied.

=== Overview ===
Team 1	Agg.	Team 2	1st leg	2nd leg
Kochi United (JFL)	3-1	YSCC Yokohama (J3)	1-1	2-0

=== Matches ===
1 December 2024
13:00 JST

Kochi United	1–1	YSCC Yokohama
Kozuki 33'	Report	Fujita 5'

Pikara Stadium, Marugame
Attendance: 3,056
Referee: Tomohiro Inoue
7 December 2024
15:00 JST

YSCC Yokohama	0–2	Kochi United
	Report	Shintani 7'; Uchida 90+1'

NHK Spring Mitsuzawa Football Stadium, Yokohama
Attendance: 5,101
Referee: Naoto Uehara

Kochi United SC won the J3/JFL play-offs on aggregate 3-1 and got promoted to J3, while YSCC Yokohama lost the play-offs and got relegated to JFL.

== JFL/Regional Leagues promotion/relegation playoff ==
The play-off (Japanese: 2024年度JFL·地域入れ替え戦) took place on 1 December 2024.

1 December 2024
13:00 (JST)

Minebea Mitsumi (2024 JFL 16th)	1–0	Vonds Ichihara (2024 JRFCL runners-up)
Otsuka 90+2'	Match report (in Japanese)

Hinata Stadium, Miyazaki
Attendance: 440
Referee: Ryosuke Yamaoka

Minebea Mitsumi stayed in the JFL; Vonds Ichihara stayed in the Kantō Soccer League Division 1.

== Top scorers ==
As of 24 November 2024.

Rank	Player	Club	Goals
1	(Japan) Kakeru Aoto	Okinawa SV	15
2	(Japan) Takuya Hitomi	Atletico Suzuka	14
3	(Japan) Atsushi Yoshida	Tochigi City	12
4	(Japan) Shota Tamura	Veertien Mie	11
5	(Brazil) Arthur Bessa	ReinMeer Aomori	10
5	(Japan) Hayato Mine	Briobecca Urayasu	10
5	(Japan) Takumi Fujiwara	Tochigi City	10

== See also ==
National association

- Japan Football Association (JFA)

League

- Japanese association football league system
  - J.League
    - 2024 J1 League
    - 2024 J2 League
    - 2024 J3 League
- 2024 Regional Champions League (JFL promotion/relegation play-offs)
- 2024 Regional Leagues (fifth/sixth tier)

Cup

- 2024 FUJIFILM Super Cup (Super Cup)
- 2024 Emperor's Cup (national open cup)
- 2024 J.League YBC Levain Cup (League Cup)
