= 2023 Japan Football League =

Japan Football League for 2023

Japan Football League
- Season: 2023
- Dates: 12 March – 26 November
- Champions: Honda FC; 10th JFL title 6th D4 title
- Matches: 210
- Goals: 517 (2.46 per match)
- Top goalscorer: Tomoki Hino (19 goals)
- Biggest home win: Sony Sendai 5–0 Tiamo Hirakata (25 June)
- Biggest away win: Okinawa SV 0–5 Honda FC (16 July)
- Highest scoring: Verspah Oita 5–5 Minebea Mitsumi (11 June)
- Highest attendance: 11,150; Criacao Shinjuku 2–1 Briobecca Urayasu (9 April)
- Lowest attendance: 121; Minebea Mitsumi 1–1 Sony Sendai (16 September)

The 2023 Japan Football League (Japanese: 第25回日本フットボールリーグ[第25回 JFL 2023], Hepburn: Dai Nijūgokai Nihon Futtobōru Rīgu [Dai Nijūgokai JFL 2023]) was the tenth season having a fourth-tier status in Japanese football and the 25th season since the establishment of the Japan Football League. The matches were mostly broadcast/streamed live at Japan Football League's channel.

== Overview ==
=== Promoted from the JFL ===
In the previous JFL edition, Nara Club were promoted to the J3 League as league champions, while FC Osaka were promoted to the J3 as runners-up. Coincidentally, both clubs are from the Kansai region, and were promoted from the Kansai Soccer League in the same 2014 season, and then debuted in the JFL in 2015. Now both clubs were again promoted together, this time to the J3 League.

=== Promoted from the Regional Leagues ===
Okinawa SV and Briobecca Urayasu were respectively, winners and runners-up of the 2022 Regional Champions League, which gives non-league teams the opportunity to be promoted to the JFL. A meeting between the JFL Board of Directors, which was held on 6 December 2022, determined whether the mentioned teams would have its membership accepted. The results were published on the same day at 13:00 (JST).

In case one or both teams failed to meet the requirements needed to play in the JFL, the next team in the order of priority would have joined the JFL, which goes in order from the first-placed team to the last-placed team in the Regional Champions League. In other words, the two best teams amongst those whom the JFL have approved membership could be promoted. Tochigi City FC, the 3rd-placed, and FC Kariya, the 4th-placed of the competition, could still have been promoted under this hypothetical situation. Nevertheless, it didn't needed to be applied, as both Okinawa and Briobecca won promotion and membership approval from the JFL.

=== Promotion and relegation between J3 and JFL ===
This season is the first to feature promotion/relegation between the J3 League and the Japan Football League, enabling the possibility for teams to be relegated from the J3. The system of promotion/relegation between the leagues can be determined by the eligibility (Promotion to J3 requires a J.League license) of the JFL's champions and runners-up for the season.

- If only the JFL champion holds a license, there will be automatic promotion/relegation with the J3's 20th-placed team.
- If only the JFL runner-up holds a license, there will be promotion/relegation play-offs with the J3's 20th-placed team.
- If both the JFL champion and runner-up hold a license, there will be automatic promotion/relegation between the JFL champions and the J3's 20th-placed team, and promotion/relegation play-offs with the J3's 19th-placed team.
- If neither the JFL champion nor the runner-up holds a license, no promotion/relegation between J3 and JFL will take place.

The dates and the host teams of the promotion/relegation play-off were pre-determined by the J.League. In case it happens: It will be played in two legs on 9 and 16 December, with the J3 team hosting the second leg; away-goals rule will not be applied; should the match be tied, it will require extra-time, and if the draw persists, penalty shoot-outs.

=== Promotion and relegation between JFL and Regional Leagues ===
For another season, the league decided to change the promotion/relegation system. The league was "forced" to it due to the withdrawal of FC Kagura Shimane from the JFL. As the club decided to withdraw from the JFL only after the league's schedule was already released, the league season needed to be played with 15 teams. On 23 January 2023, the JFL confirmed the following:

- The winner of the 2023 Regional Champions League (JFL promotion series) will be automatically promoted for the 2024 JFL.
- The 15th-placed team from the JFL will play a play-off match against the runners-up of the promotion series, with the winner earning a spot at the 2024 JFL.

Further details about the subject, as well as the league schedule, was released by the league on 10 February. The league officially scheduled the 2023 season on that day.

=== Withdrawal ===
On 21 September 2022, via their Twitter account, Kagura Shimane announced it was pending payment of about two and a half months' worth of wages for players and staff. Many discussions were made between the JFL Board of Directors and Kagura Shimane's staff and executives. Only on 23 January 2023, after many postponements regarding the final decision over the subject, it was confirmed that Shimane withdrew from the JFL, just a few days after the league schedule was released.

=== Club name changes ===
On 27 January 2023, Honda Lock SC and MIO Biwako Shiga officially changed their names to Minebea Mitsumi FC and Reilac Shiga respectively.

== Participating clubs ==
The teams which possess promotion-enabler licenses are highlighted in green in the following table. From 2023, the 100 Year Plan status seems to be no longer required to receive approval for a potential J3 promotion.

Club name	Home town	Stadium	Capacity	Position	Notes
Briobecca Urayasu	Urayasu, Chiba	Kashiwanoha Stadium	20,000	JRCL (1st)	
Criacao Shinjuku	Shinjuku-ku, Tokyo	Ajinomoto Field Nishigaoka	7,258	JFL (15th)	100 Year Plan status J3 license holders
Honda FC	Hamamatsu, Shizuoka	Honda Miyakoda Soccer Stadium	2,506	JFL (3rd)	
Kochi United	Kōchi, Kōchi	Kōchi Haruno Athletic Stadium	25,000	JFL (11th)	J3 license withdrew
Maruyasu Okazaki	Okazaki, Aichi	Maruyasu Okazaki Ryuhoku Stadium	5,000	JFL (5th)	
Minebea Mitsumi	Miyazaki, Miyazaki	Hinata Athletic Stadium	20,000	JFL (10th)	
Okinawa SV	All cities/towns in Okinawa (Note: centering on Tomigusuku, Uruma, and Okinawa)	Tapic Kenso Hiyagon Stadium	10,189	JRCL (2nd)	
Reilac Shiga	Kusatsu, Shiga	Higashiomi Nunobiki Green Stadium	5,060	JFL (16th)	100 Year Plan status applicants J3 license issued
ReinMeer Aomori	Aomori, Aomori	Kakuhiro Group Athletic Stadium	20,809	JFL (4th)	J3 license holders
Sony Sendai	Tagajō, Miyagi	Miyagi Seikyo Megumino Soccer Stadium	10,000	JFL (14th)	
Suzuka Point Getters	Suzuka, Mie	AGF Suzuka Athletic Stadium	1,450	JFL (9th)	J3 license deprived
Tiamo Hirakata	Hirakata, Osaka	Tamayura Athletic Stadium	2,500	JFL (13th)	
Tokyo Musashino United	Musashino, Tokyo	Musashino Municipal Athletic Stadium	5,188	JFL (6th)	
Veertien Mie	All cities/towns in Mie (Note: centering on Kuwana & Yokkaichi)	La Pita Toin Stadium	5,077	JFL (7th)	J3 license holders
Verspah Oita	Yufu, Beppu & Ōita, Ōita	Resonac Soccer/Rugby Field	4,700	JFL (8th)	J3 license holders

=== Personnel and kits ===
Club	Manager	Kit manufacturer	Main shirt sponsor
Briobecca Urayasu	(Japan) Satoshi Tsunami	(Japan) soccer junky	Urata
Criacao Shinjuku	(Japan) Hideaki Kitajima	(Japan) gym master	Assetlead
Honda FC	(Japan) Hidekazu Kobayashi	(England) Umbro	Honda
Kochi United	(Japan) Takafumi Yoshimoto	(Brazil) Athleta	None
Maruyasu Okazaki	(Japan) Hiroyasu Ibata	(Brazil) Athleta	Maruyasu
Minebea Mitsumi	(Japan) Yosuke Miyaji	(England) Umbro	MinebeaMitsumi
Okinawa SV	(Japan) Naohiro Takahara	(Japan) XF	Nestle Japan
Reilac Shiga	(Japan) Toshimi Kikuchi	(Japan) Jogarbola	Rei Beauty; Dermatology Clinic
ReinMeer Aomori	(Japan) Kei Shibata	(England) Umbro	Towa
Sony Sendai	(Japan) Jun Suzuki	(England) Umbro	Sony
Suzuka Point Getters	(Japan) Yasutoshi Miura	(Brazil) Athleta	Topia
Tiamo Hirakata	(Japan) Takahiro Futagawa	(Japan) Jogarbola	Izawa Towel
Tokyo Musashino United	(Japan) Hiroki Yoda	(Japan) Yonex	Yokogawa Electric
Veertien Mie	(Japan) Yasuhiro Higuchi	(Japan) Sfida	Cosmo Oil
Verspah Oita	(Japan) Takashi Yamahashi	(Japan) Yasuda	Hoyo

=== Managerial changes ===
Team	Outgoing	Manner	Exit date		Position in table	Incoming	Incoming date		Ref.
Team	Outgoing	Manner	Announced on	Departed on	Position in table	Incoming	Announced on	Arrived on	Ref.
Reilac Shiga	Akira Teramine	Sacked	4 September 2023		7th	Toshimi Kikuchi	4 September 2023		

== Foreign players ==
Club	Player 1	Player 2	Player 3
Briobecca Urayasu			
Criacao Shinjuku	(North Korea) Hwang Song-su		
Honda FC			
Kochi United	(Australia) Tando Velaphi		
Maruyasu Okazaki			
Minebea Mitsumi			
Okinawa SV			
Reilac Shiga	(South Korea) Mun Jun-su	(Hong Kong) Leung Yau Wai	
ReinMeer Aomori	(Brazil) Vinícius	(Costa Rica) Giovanni Clunie	
Sony Sendai			
Suzuka Point Getters	(South Korea) Kim Tae-woo	(Hong Kong) To Chun Kiu	
Tiamo Hirakata	(Nigeria) Emeka Basil		
Tokyo Musashino United			
Veertien Mie	(Brazil) Efrain Rintaro	(North Korea) Kim Song-sun	(North Korea) Ryang Hyon-ju
Verspah Oita			

== League table ==
Pos	Team	Pld	W	D	L	GF	GA	GD	Pts	Promotion, qualification or relegation
1	Honda FC (C)	28	15	8	5	51	26	+25	53	
2	Briobecca Urayasu	28	12	9	7	42	35	+7	45	
3	Reilac Shiga	28	11	11	6	47	37	+10	44	
4	Sony Sendai	28	11	10	7	46	40	+6	43	
5	ReinMeer Aomori	28	11	9	8	30	24	+6	42	
6	Verspah Oita	28	10	10	8	28	29	−1	40	
7	Kochi United	28	10	8	10	30	26	+4	38	
8	Maruyasu Okazaki	28	9	10	9	34	34	0	37	
9	Suzuka Point Getters	28	10	6	12	34	41	−7	36	
10	Veertien Mie	28	9	8	11	35	32	+3	35	
11	Criacao Shinjuku	28	10	4	14	25	33	−8	34	
12	Tiamo Hirakata	28	8	10	10	32	42	−10	34	
13	Tokyo Musashino United	28	9	5	14	30	36	−6	32	
14	Minebea Mitsumi	28	8	7	13	35	44	−9	31	
15	Okinawa SV (O)	28	7	5	16	18	38	−20	26	Qualification for relegation playoffs

Source: Japan Football League
Rules for classification: 1) Points; 2) Goal difference; 3) Goals scored; 4) Head-to-head points; 5) Head-to-head goal difference; 6) Head-to-head goal scored; 7) Fair-play points.
(C) Champions; (O) Play-off winners

== JFL/Regional Leagues promotion/relegation playoff ==
The play-offs (Japanese: 2023年度JFL·地域入れ替え戦) took place on 3 December 2023.

3 December 2023
13:00

Okinawa SV (2023 JFL 15th)	2–1 (a.e.t.)	Vonds Ichihara (2023 JRFCL runners-up)
Anzai 70'; Ijuin 105'	Report	Tosa 78'

Tapic Kenso Hiyagon Stadium, Okinawa, Okinawa
Attendance: 685
Referee: Toshihiro Nakai

Okinawa SV stayed in the JFL; Vonds Ichihara stayed in the Kantō Soccer League Division 1.

== Top scorers ==
Rank	Player	Club	Goals
1	(Japan) Tomoki Hino	Minebea Mitsumi	19
2	(Japan) Yosuke Ueno	Sony Sendai	10
2	(Japan) Yuki Okazaki	Honda FC	10
4	(Japan) Tsubasa Sano	Criacao Shinjuku	9
4	(Japan) Keitaro Suzuki	Sony Sendai	9

== See also ==
National association

- Japan Football Association (JFA)

League

- Japanese association football league system
  - J.League
    - 2023 J1 League
    - 2023 J2 League
    - 2023 J3 League

Cup

- 2023 Emperor's Cup (national open cup)
