= Minebea Mitsumi FC =

Japanese football club

Minebea Mitsumi FC ミネベアミツミFC
- Full name: Minebea Mitsumi Football Club
- Founded: 1964; 62 years ago as Honda Lock SC
- Stadium: Miyazaki Ikime no Mori Ivy Stadium; Miyazaki
- Capacity: 11,000
- Owner: MinebeaMitsumi, Inc.
- Manager: Yosuke Miyaji
- League: Japan Football League
- 2025: 10th of 16
- Website: https://minebeamitsumi-fc.com/
Home colours	Away colours

Minebea Mitsumi FC (ミネベアミツミFC, Minebea Mitsumi Efu Shī), formerly Honda Lock SC (ホンダロックSC, Honda Rokku Esu Shī) are a Japanese football (soccer) club based in Miyazaki, the capital city of Miyazaki Prefecture. They play in the Japan Football League, Japanese 4th tier of league football. Their team colour is blue.

== History ==
Former logo of Honda Lock SC

The club was founded in 1964 by the factory workers of Honda Lock Manufacturing Co., an affiliate company of Honda Motor. They were promoted to the Kyushu Regional League in 1997 and acquired official backing from the company in 1999. They won the Kyushu Regional League in 2004 and were accepted by the Japan Football League following the Regional League promotion series.

They spent two years in the JFL but were relegated to the Kyūshū Regional League for the 2007 season after they lost to F.C. Gifu in the promotion/relegation play-offs.

Honda Lock returned to the JFL in 2009 after placing third in the 2008 Regional League promotion series.

Honda Lock SC changed its name to Minebea Mitsumi FC ahead of 2023 season, with Japanese Multinational corporation and a major producer of machinery components and electronics devices MinebeaMitsumi, taking over the club. The deal was completed on 27 January 2023. Regarding Honda Lock SC, Honda Lock Co. Ltd. a shareholder and MinebeaMitsumi Co. Ltd. entered into a share transfer agreement for the acquisition of shares of Honda Lock became a subsidiary.

== Changes in club name ==
- Honda Lock SC : 1964–2022
- Minebea Mitsumi FC : 2023–present

== Stadiums ==
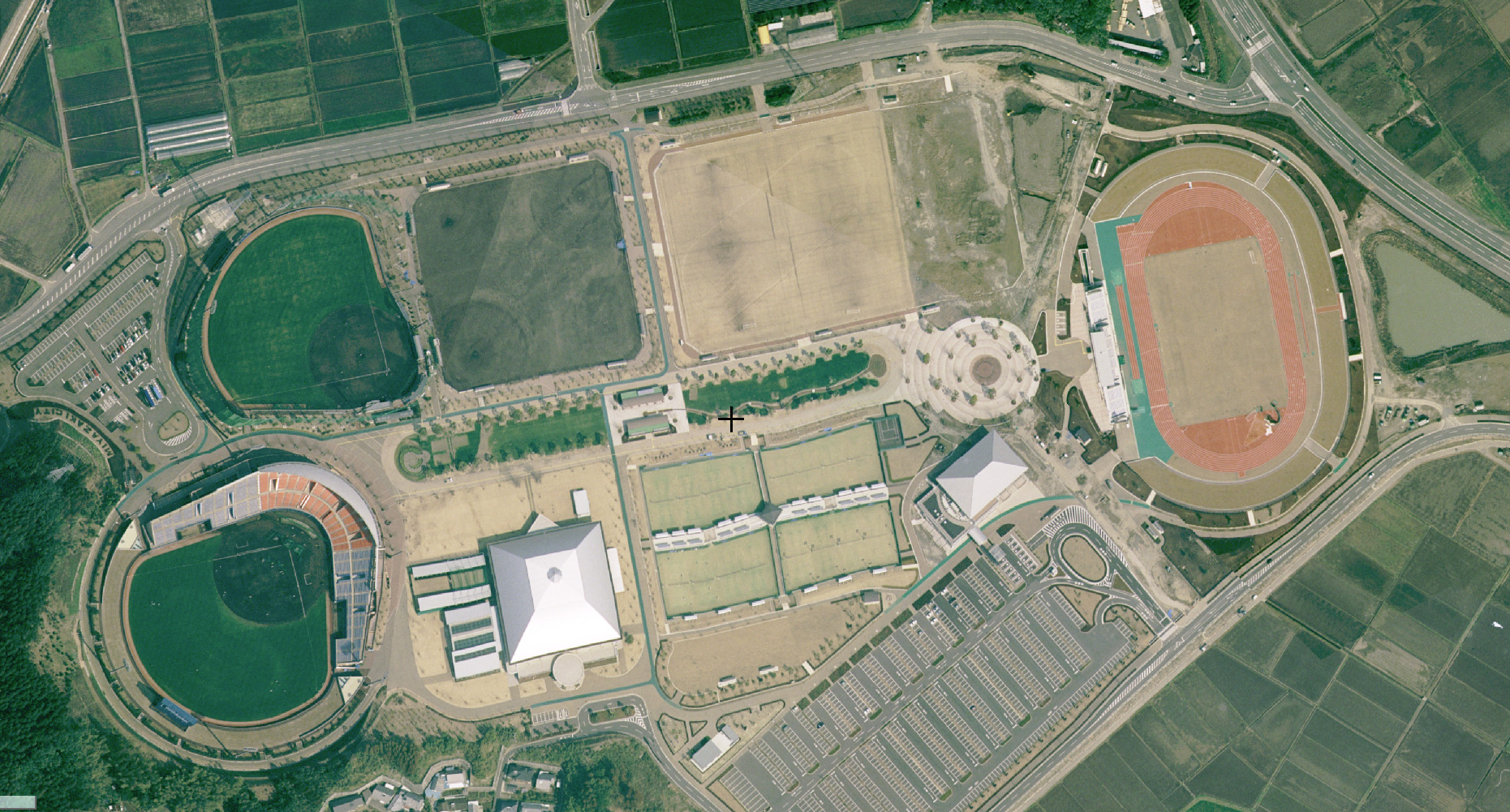
Ikimenomori Sports Park

== League & cup record ==
Champions	Runners-up	Third place	Promoted	Relegated

League														Emperor's Cup
Season	Division	Tier	Teams	Pos.	P	W (PK)	D	L (PK)	F	A	GD	Pts	Attendance/G	Emperor's Cup
As Honda Lock SC
2003	KSL	4	12	6th	22	8 (2)	-	9 (3)	40	44	-4	31		Did not qualify
2004	KSL	4	10	1st	18	14 (2)	-	1 (1)	52	16	36	47		3rd round
2005	JFL	3	16	15th	30	3	6	21	38	79	-41	15		4th round
2006	JFL	3	18	18th	34	5	7	22	39	86	-47	22		Did not qualify
2007	KSL	4	11	2nd	20	17	-	2 (1)	76	19	57	52		3rd round
2008	KSL	4	10	3rd	18	14 (2)	-	2	62	14	48	46		3rd round
2009	JFL	3	18	13th	34	9	13	12	34	38	-4	40		3rd round
2010	JFL	3	18	13th	34	10	12	12	36	39	-3	42		2nd round
2011	JFL	3	18	8th	33	12	11	10	47	45	2	52		2nd round
2012	JFL	3	17	16th	32	7	7	18	28	56	-28	28		Did not qualify
2013	JFL	3	18	18th	34	6	11	17	25	47	-22	29		Did not qualify
2014	JFL	4	14	10th	26	7	6	13	31	52	-21	27		2nd round
2015	JFL	4	16	9th	30	11	7	12	31	37	-6	40		Did not qualify
2016	JFL	4	16	3rd	30	17	8	5	46	23	23	59		1st round
2017	JFL	4	16	8th	30	9	7	14	36	46	-10	34		Did not qualify
2018	JFL	4	16	14th	30	6	11	13	29	52	-23	29		Did not qualify
2019	JFL	4	16	6th	30	10	11	9	41	39	2	41		2nd round
2020	JFL	4	16	12th	15	5	4	6	19	25	-6	19		Did not qualify
2021	JFL	4	17	16th	32	6	9	17	26	48	-22	27		2nd round
2022	JFL	4	16	10th	30	10	6	14	33	33	0	36		2nd round
As Minebea Mitsumi FC
2023	JFL	4	15	12th	28	8	7	13	35	44	-9	31		Did not qualify
2024	JFL	4	16	16th	30	5	7	18	25	48	-23	22		Did not qualify
2025	JFL	4	16	10	30	9	7	14	40	41	-1	34	513	Did not qualify
2026–27	JFL	4	16	TBD	30									TBD

Key

- Pos. = Position in league; P = Games played; W = Games won; D = Games drawn; L = Games lost; F = Goals for; A = Goals against; GD = Goals difference; Pts = Points gained
- Attendance/G = Average league home attendance
- Source: JFL

== Honours ==
Minebea Mitsumi FC honours
Honour	No.	Years	Notes
Kyushu Soccer League	1	2004	As Honda Lock SC

== Current squad ==
As of 7 April 2024. Note: Flags indicate national team as defined under FIFA eligibility rules; some limited exceptions apply. Players may hold more than one non-FIFA nationality.

No.	Pos.	Nation	Player
1	GK	JPN	Takuya Yuzawa
2	DF	JPN	Takuma Nakajima
3	DF	JPN	Naoki Ono
4	DF	JPN	Mao Igarashi
5	DF	JPN	Takeru Suzuki
6	MF	JPN	Shota Makino
7	MF	JPN	Toranosuke Takagi
8	MF	JPN	Seiya Nawa
9	FW	JPN	Mizuki Owaki
10	MF	JPN	Yamato Tanaka
13	MF	JPN	Daichi Takahara
14	MF	JPN	Jin Nakamura
15	DF	JPN	Yuta Koshino

No.	Pos.	Nation	Player
16	GK	JPN	Shu Tomonaga
17	MF	JPN	Tomoki Kihashi
18	FW	JPN	Yosuke Suzuki
19	MF	JPN	Ryoga Noda
20	DF	JPN	Hikaru Imada
21	GK	JPN	Kanshiro Amamoto
22	DF	JPN	Tomoki Okawa
23	MF	JPN	Kenta Higuchi
24	MF	JPN	Fumiya Kai
25	FW	JPN	Hiroto Otsuka
26	FW	JPN	Shoya Fujii
27	DF	JPN	Naoki Takasu

== Coaching staff ==
Position	Name
Manager	(Japan) Yosuke Miyaji
Assistant Managers	(Japan) Tsuneyuki Ueda (Japan) Kenichi Nakayama (Japan) Naoya Oyama

== Managerial history ==
Manager	Nationality	Tenure	
Manager	Nationality	Start	Finish
Hisashi Hiroike	Japan	1 February 2009	31 January 2011
Ryuichi Ikeda	Japan	1 February 2011	12 September 2011
Norita Ochiai	Japan	13 September 2011	22 September 2011
Kazunori Jo	Japan	23 September 2011	31 January 2013
Masashi Kawashima	Japan	1 January 2013	31 December 2013
Ittetsu Idogawa	Japan	1 February 2014	31 January 2016
Kenji Taniguchi	Japan	1 February 2016	31 January 2019
Shinya Shirakawa	Japan	1 February 2019	10 June 2020
Yōsuke Miyaji	Japan	11 June 2020	Current
