= Yasuhiro Yamamura =

Japanese footballer

Yasuhiro Yamamura 山村 泰弘
Personal information
- Date of birth: August 18, 1976 (age 50)
- Place of birth: Handa, Aichi, Japan
- Height: 1.76 m (5 ft 9 1/2 in)
- Position: Defender

Youth career
- 1992–1994: Aichi High School
- 1995–1998: Aichi Gakuin University

Senior career*
Years	Team	Apps	(Gls)
1999	Ventforet Kofu	0	(0)
2000	Mito HollyHock	33	(0)
2001–2002	Gunma FC Horikoshi	21	(2)
2003–2004	Okinawa Kariyushi FC	43	(5)
2004–2007	Gainare Tottori	66	(0)
2008–2009	SC Tottori Dreams	9	(2)
2010–2016	Maruyasu Okazaki	35	(0)
Total		207	(9)

Managerial career
- 2014–2016: Maruyasu Okazaki
- * Club domestic league appearances and goals

Yasuhiro Yamamura (山村 泰弘, Yamamura Yasuhiro; born August 18, 1976) is a former Japanese football player and manager.

== Playing career ==
Yamamura was born in Handa on August 18, 1976. After graduating from Aichi Gakuin University, he joined newly was promoted to J2 League club, Ventforet Kofu in 1999. However he could hardly play in the match. In 2000, he moved to newly was promoted to J2 League club, Mito HollyHock. He became as regular player and played many matches as defensive midfielder and right side back. In 2001, he moved to Prefectural Leagues club Gunma FC Horikoshi. He played many matches and the club was promoted to Regional Leagues. In 2003, he moved to Regional Leagues club Okinawa Kariyushi FC and played many matches in 2 seasons. In November 2004, he moved to Japan Football League (JFL) club Gainare Tottori and played many matches until 2007. In 2008, he moved to Prefectural Leagues club SC Tottori Dreams and played in 2 seasons. In 2010, he moved to Regional Leagues club Maruyasu Industries (later Maruyasu Okazaki). He played many matches and the club was promoted to JFL from 2014. He retired at the end of the 2016 season.

== Coaching career ==
In 2014, when Yamamura played for Japan Football League club Maruyasu Okazaki, he became a playing manager. he managed the club until 2016.

== Club statistics ==
Club performance			League		Cup		League Cup		Total	
Season	Club	League	Apps	Goals	Apps	Goals	Apps	Goals	Apps	Goals
Japan			League		Emperor's Cup		J.League Cup		Total	
1999	Ventforet Kofu	J2 League	0	0	1	0	0	0	1	0
2000	Mito HollyHock	J2 League	33	0	1	0	1	0	35	0
2001	Gunma FC Fortona	Prefectural Leagues	14	2	2	0	-		16	2
2002	Gunma FC Horikoshi	Regional Leagues	7	0	2	0	-		9	0
2003	Okinawa Kariyushi FC	Regional Leagues	21	3	2	0	-		23	3
2004	Okinawa Kariyushi FC	Regional Leagues	22	2	-		-		22	2
2004	SC Tottori	Football League	3	0	0	0	-		3	0
2005	SC Tottori	Football League	21	0	2	0	-		23	0
2006	SC Tottori	Football League	26	0	1	0	-		27	0
2007	Gainare Tottori	Football League	16	0	0	0	-		16	0
2008	SC Tottori Dreams	Prefectural Leagues	5	2	-		-		5	2
2009	SC Tottori Dreams	Prefectural Leagues	4	0	0	0	-		4	0
2010	Maruyasu Industries	Regional Leagues	12	0	-		-		12	0
2011	Maruyasu Industries	Regional Leagues	10	0	-		-		10	0
2012	Maruyasu Industries	Regional Leagues	7	0	-		-		7	0
2013	Maruyasu Industries	Regional Leagues	1	0	-		-		1	0
2014	Maruyasu Okazaki	Football League	5	0	0	0	-		5	0
2015	Maruyasu Okazaki	Football League	0	0	0	0	-		0	0
2016	Maruyasu Okazaki	Football League	0	0	0	0	-		0	0
Total			207	9	11	0	1	0	219	9
