= Yusuke Murase =

Japanese footballer

Personal information
- Date of birth: 9 April 1998 (age 28)
- Place of birth: Osaka, Japan
- Height: 1.86 m (6 ft 1 in)
- Position: Defender

Team information
- Current team: Veertien Mie
- Number: 27

Youth career
- Stay Cool
- Cerezo Osaka
- Hannan University HS
- –2020: Osaka Kyoiku University

Senior career*
Years	Team	Apps	(Gls)
2020–2022	FC Ryukyu	0	(0)
2022	→ FC Maruyasu Okazaki (loan)	1	(0)
2023–2024	FC Maruyasu Okazaki	42	(1)
2025–	Veertien Mie	0	(0)
- * Club domestic league appearances and goals as of 16 March 2025

Yusuke Murase (村瀬 悠介, Murase Yusuke; born 9 April 1998) is a Japanese footballer who plays as a defender for Japan Football League club Veertien Mie.

== Club career ==
Murase made his professional debut in a 0–1 Emperor's Cup loss against Matsumoto Yamaga.

== Career statistics ==
=== Club ===
As of 9 June 2021.

Club	Season	League			National Cup		League Cup		Other		Total	
Club	Season	Division	Apps	Goals	Apps	Goals	Apps	Goals	Apps	Goals	Apps	Goals
FC Ryukyu	2021	J2 League	0	0	1 (Note: Appearances in the Emperor's Cup)	0	0	0	0	0	1	0
Career total			0	0	1	0	0	0	0	0	1	0
