= Okinawa SV =

Japanese football club

Okinawa SV 沖縄SV
- Full name: Okinawa Sport-Verein
- Founded: 2015; 11 years ago
- Stadium: Tapic Kenso Hiyagon Stadium; Okinawa, Okinawa
- Capacity: 12,270
- Chairman: Naohiro Takahara
- Manager: Rei Onogi
- League: Japan Football League
- 2025: 8th of 16
- Website: okinawasv.com
Home colours	Away colours

Okinawa Sport-Verein (沖縄スポーツクラブ, Okinawa Supōtsukurabu), commonly known as Okinawa SV (沖縄SV, Okinawa Esufau) is a Japanese football club based in the cities of Tomigusuku and Uruma, which are located in Okinawa Prefecture. Okinawa play in the Japan Football League, Japanese 4th tier of league football.

== History ==
After leaving SC Sagamihara and retiring from professional football, former Japan national team international Naohiro Takahara decided to setup a new club in Okinawa. The main part of the club's identity comes from two overseas clubs, in which Takahara played in during his career. The name of the club was inspired by Germany's Hamburger SV, which influenced Takahara to found the club as Okinawa Sport-Verein (a German term meaning "sports club"). The kit's colours and its design are inspired by Argentinian Boca Juniors, who have used blue and yellow colours in their kits since 1907.

Takahara set himself as president, manager-player and captain, helping the Kyushu-based club to start from the bottom of Japanese football. In their first year, on 2016, Okinawa SV played in the third division of the Okinawa Prefectural League in a successful debut season, going undefeated while also scoring 123 goals, and only conceding a single one. The Okinawa Football Association opted to give the club a free pass to join the 1st Division of the Prefectural League. In their second season, Okinawa SV achieved another promotion, now to the Kyushu Soccer League.

On 27 November 2022, Okinawa SV was promoted to JFL for the first time in their history. They were assured of promotion after defeating FC Kariya by 4–0 in their last match in the Regional Champions League final round. Okinawa SV just needed 6 seasons to jump from the 3rd division of Okinawa Prefectural League to the national stage, in Japan's 4th division.

On 2 December 2023, Okinawa SV managed to stay in JFL after defeating Vonds Ichihara by a score of 2–1 in 2023 JFL promotion relegation play-off due to finishing in 15th and last place.

== Stadium ==
After playing at Okinawa Kincho Football Center in 2022, Okinawa SV played all home matches at Tapic Kenso Hiyagon Stadium in JFL for 2023 season after announcement of the full schedule on 10 February 2023.

== League and cup record ==
- (x,y) in column D denotes number of win and lost in shootout.

Champions	Runners-up	Third place	Promoted	Relegated

League												Emperor's Cup
Season	Division	Pos.	P	W (PK)	D	L (PK)	F	A	GD	Pts	Attendance/G	Emperor's Cup
2016	Okinawa Prefectural; League (Div. 3, North)	1st	9	9	0	0	123	1	122	27		Did not qualify
2017	Okinawa Prefectural; League (Div. 1)	2nd	9	8	1	0	64	4	60	25		Did not qualify
2018	KSL	2nd	18	16 (0)		2	74	12	62	48		Did not qualify
2019	KSL	1st	18	17 (0)		1	64	7	57	51		2nd round
2020	KSL	1st	4	3 (1)		0	12	2	10	11		Did not qualify
2021	KSL	1st	18	16 (1)		0 (1)	78	8	70	51		2nd round
2022	KSL	1st	20	19	1	0	75	5	70	58		2nd round
2023	JFL	15th	28	7	5	16	18	38	-20	26	298	Did not qualify
2024	JFL	9th	30	11	8	11	52	44	8	41	381	1st round
2025	JFL	8th	30	12	7	11	39	41	-2	43	307	2nd round
2026–27	JFL	TBD	30									TBD

Key

- Pos. = Position in league; P = Games played; W = Games won; D = Games drawn; L = Games lost; F = Goals scored; A = Goals conceded; GD = Goals difference; Pts = Points gained
- Attendance/G = Average league home attendance

=== Emperor's Cup record ===
26 May 2019 2019 EC 1st round	Okinawa SV	2−0	Matsuyama University	Imabari, Ehime
13:00	Takahara 6'; Yamauchi 80'	Report (JFA); Report (JFA)		Stadium: Arigato Service Dream Stadium; Attendance: 589

3 July 2019 2019 EC 2nd round	Okinawa SV	0−4	Sanfrecce Hiroshima	Fukuyama, Hiroshima
18:30		Report (JFA); Report (JFA)	Higashi 47'; Matsumoto 81'; Patric 84', 90+1'	Stadium: Fukuyama Takegahana Park Stadium; Attendance: 2,751

23 May 2021 2021 EC 1st round	Okinawa SV	3−1 (a.e.t.)	Fukuoka University	Fukuoka, Fukuoka
13:00	Shoji 47'; Sugiyama 92'; Akagi 105+1'	Report (JFA); Report (JFA)	Hojo 15'	Stadium: Best Denki Stadium; Attendance: 282; Referee: Shinya Sasaki

9 June 2021 2021 EC 2nd round	Okinawa SV	0−2	V-Varen Nagasaki	Isahaya, Nagasaki
19:00		Report (JFA); Report (JFA)	Ibarbo 29'; Otake 90'	Stadium: Transcosmos Stadium Nagasaki; Attendance: 1,884; Referee: Yusuke Ohashi

21 May 2022 2022 EC 1st round	Okinawa SV	4−1	FC Imabari	Matsuyama, Ehime
12:00	Yamada 55', 68'; Gibo 60'; Anzai 63'	Report (JFA); Report (JFA)	Nakagawa 45'	Stadium: Ningineer Stadium; Attendance: 516; Referee: Kenya Ohara

1 June 2022 2022 EC 2nd round	Okinawa SV	0−3	Avispa Fukuoka	Fukuoka, Fukuoka
19:00		Report (JFA); Report (JFA)	Kanamori 40'; Kitajima 52'; Toya 71'	Stadium: Best Denki Stadium; Attendance: 1,459; Referee: Tetsuro Yoshida

26 May 2024 2024 EC 1st round	Fukuyama City	3−0	Okinawa SV	Hiroshima, Hiroshima
13:00	Okubo 2'; Sugiura 10'; Nohama 76'	Report		Stadium: Edion Peace Wing Hiroshima; Attendance: 1,232; Referee: Yuki Tanabe

== Honours ==
Okinawa SV honours
Honour	No.	Years
Okinawa Prefectural League	1	2016
Okinawa Prefectural Football Championship (Emperor's Cup Okinawa Prefectural Qualifiers)	5	2019, 2021, 2022, 2024, 2025
Kyushu Soccer League	3	2019, 2021, 2022
Japan Football League Cup	1	2026

== Current squad ==
As of 23 November 2025.

Note: Flags indicate national team as defined under FIFA eligibility rules; some limited exceptions apply. Players may hold more than one non-FIFA nationality.

No.	Pos.	Nation	Player
1	GK	JPN	Chikara Hanada
2	DF	JPN	Haruya Mizukoshi
3	DF	JPN	Shota Fujisaki
4	DF	JPN	Shuntaro Yaguchi (On loan from JEF United Chiba)
5	DF	JPN	Daisuke Matsushita
6	MF	JPN	Hitoshi Ishida
7	MF	JPN	Justin Toshiki Kinjo
8	DF	JPN	Keigo Numata
9	FW	JPN	Kazuki Ganaha
12	GK	JPN	Ryonosuke Nagaya
13	MF	JPN	Shuto Ogawa
14	MF	JPN	Hayase Takashio (On loan from Yokohama FC)
15	DF	JPN	Atsuki Ono
16	MF	JPN	Shuri Arita

No.	Pos.	Nation	Player
17	FW	JPN	Yuto Katayama
18	FW	JPN	Yosuke Ueno (On loan from Tegevajaro Miyazaki)
19	FW	JPN	Aoi Ando (On loan from Shimizu S Pulse)
20	MF	JPN	Takuto Kato (on loan from Tegevajaro Miyazaki)
21	GK	JPN	Daiki Akiyama
22	MF	JPN	Nobuki Iketaka
25	DF	JPN	Shota Shinoda
27	MF	JPN	Riku Shimoguchi
28	FW	JPN	Mao Taira
29	MF	JPN	Tatsuya Murata
31	GK	JPN	Kotaro Miyazaki
32	MF	JPN	Shuga Arai
33	MF	JPN	Kaito Hirata
34	DF	JPN	Leo Fukuda

== Coaching staff ==
Position	Name
Chairman	(Japan) Naohiro Takahara
Manager	(Japan) Rei Onogi
Analyst and Goalkeeper coach	(Japan) Hiroki Teraoka
Physical coach	(Japan) Shota Asano
Trainer	(Japan) Ryoma Sunabe

== Kit evolution ==
Home kit - 1st
2017 1st	2018 1st

Away kit - 2nd
2017 2nd	2018 2nd
