= Masayuki Tokutake =

Japanese footballer

Masayuki Tokutake 徳武 正之
Personal information
- Full name: Masayuki Tokutake
- Date of birth: August 18, 1991 (age 35)
- Place of birth: Kodaira, Tokyo, Japan
- Height: 1.75 m (5 ft 9 in)
- Position: Defender

Team information
- Current team: FC Maruyasu Okazaki
- Number: 22

Youth career
- 2010–2013: Tokoha University

Senior career*
| Years | Team | Apps | (Gls) |
| 2014–2016 | Zweigen Kanazawa | 7 | (0) |
| 2016–2022 | Azul Claro Numazu | 129 | (6) |
| 2022- | FC Maruyasu Okazaki | 69 | (1) |
- * Club domestic league appearances and goals as of 22 August 2024 @ 16:42(AEST)

Masayuki Tokutake (徳武 正之, Tokutake Masayuki; born August 18, 1991) is a Japanese football player. He plays for Azul Claro Numazu.

== Playing career ==
Masayuki Tokutake played for Zweigen Kanazawa from 2014 to 2015. In 2016, he moved to Azul Claro Numazu.

== Club statistics ==
Updated to 14 April 2020.

| Club performance | | | League | | Cup | | Total | |
| Season | Club | League | Apps | Goals | Apps | Goals | Apps | Goals |
| Japan | | | League | | Emperor's Cup | | Total | |
|---|---|---|---|---|---|---|---|---|
| 2014 | Zweigen Kanazawa | J3 League | 7 | 0 | 0 | 0 | 7 | 0 |
| 2015 | Zweigen Kanazawa | J2 League | 0 | 0 | 0 | 0 | 0 | 0 |
| 2016 | Azul Claro Numazu | JFL | 8 | 2 | – | | 8 | 2 |
| 2017 | Azul Claro Numazu | J3 League | 29 | 0 | 1 | 0 | 30 | 0 |
| 2018 | Azul Claro Numazu | J3 League | 32 | 3 | – | | 32 | 3 |
| 2019 | Azul Claro Numazu | J3 League | 28 | 1 | – | | 28 | 1 |
| Total | | | 104 | 6 | 1 | 0 | 105 | 6 |
