= FC Maruyasu Okazaki =

Japanese football club

FC Maruyasu Okazaki FCマルヤス岡崎
- Full name: Maruyasu Industries Football Club
- Founded: 1968; 58 years ago
- Ground: Maruyasu Okazaki Ryuhoku Stadium
- Capacity: 5,000
- Owner: Maruyasu Industries
- Chairman: Yamada Yasuichiro
- Manager: Hiroyasu Ibata
- League: Japan Football League
- 2025: 11th of 16
- Website: fc-maruyasu.jp
Home colours	Away colours

Maruyasu Industries FC (マルヤス工業フットボールクラブ, Maruyasu Kogyō Futtobōru Kurabu), playing as FC Maruyasu Okazaki (FCマルヤス岡崎, Efu Shī Maruyasu Okazaki), is a Japanese professional football team based in Okazaki, Aichi Prefecture. They currently play in Japan Football League, Japanese fourth tier of nationwide football league system.

== History ==
The club has been established in 1968 as the corporate team of Maruyasu Industries. In 1976 the team won promotion to Tōkai Soccer League where remained ever since except for 2003 and 2004 seasons when they suffered relegation to Division 2. The club has won the league in 2013 and though they were unable to take up one of three promotion-granting places in the Regional League promotion series, they were admitted to in JFL in 2014 season by the league board.

Before their first season on the nationwide level the club has changed its name to FC Maruyasu Okazaki to appeal more to the local community.

== League and cup record ==
Champions	Runners-up	Third place	Promoted	Relegated

League													Emperor's Cup
Season	Division	Tier	Teams	Pos.	GP	W	D	L	F	A	GD	Pts	Emperor's Cup
2003	Tōkai Adult Soccer; League (Div. 2)	6	9	3rd	16	9	4	3	40	19	21	31	2nd round
2004	Tōkai Adult Soccer; League (Div. 2)	6	8	1st	14	10	2	2	28	15	13	32	Did not qualify
2005	Tōkai Adult Soccer League; League (Div. 1)	5	8	5th	14	5	3	6	25	23	2	18	Did not qualify
2006	Tōkai Adult Soccer League; League (Div. 1)	5	8	5th	14	5	3	6	21	25	−4	18	Did not qualify
2007	Tōkai Adult Soccer League; League (Div. 1)	5	8	6th	14	4	2	8	18	35	−17	14	Did not qualify
2008	Tōkai Adult Soccer League; League (Div. 1)	5	8	6th	14	4	3	7	15	24	−9	15	Did not qualify
2009	Tōkai Adult Soccer League; League (Div. 1)	5	8	6th	14	5	2	7	20	28	−8	17	Did not qualify
2010	Tōkai Adult Soccer League; League (Div. 1)	5	9	3rd	16	9	1	6	29	22	7	28	Did not qualify
2011	Tōkai Adult Soccer League; League (Div. 1)	5	8	7th	14	3	2	9	22	26	−4	11	Did not qualify
2012	Tōkai Adult Soccer League; League (Div. 1)	5	8	3rd	14	7	2	5	33	25	8	23	Did not qualify
2013	Tōkai Adult Soccer League; League (Div. 1)	5	8	1st	14	9	1	4	26	15	11	28	Did not qualify
2014	JFL	4	14	14th	26	3	7	16	23	58	−35	16	Did not qualify
2015	JFL	4	16	13th	30	6	3	21	27	61	−34	21	1st round
2016	JFL	4	16	14th	30	7	9	14	23	38	−15	30	Did not qualify
2017	JFL	4	16	9th	30	9	7	14	35	46	−11	34	2nd round
2018	JFL	4	16	13th	30	7	8	15	33	46	−13	31	Did not qualify
2019	JFL	4	16	11th	30	9	11	10	30	30	0	38	Did not qualify
2020	JFL	4	16	16th	15	4	3	8	14	22	−8	15	3rd round
2021	JFL	4	17	14th	32	8	9	15	27	46	−19	33	Did not qualify
2022	JFL	4	16	5th	30	14	7	9	48	34	14	49	Did not qualify
2023	JFL	4	15	8th	28	9	10	9	34	34	0	37	1st round
2024	JFL	4	16	13th	30	6	12	12	30	39	–9	30	Did not qualify
2025	JFL	4	16	11th	30	9	7	14	29	38	–9	34	Did not qualify
2026–27	JFL	4	16	TBD	30								TBD

Key

- Pos. = Position in league; GP = Games played; W = Games won; D = Games drawn; L = Games lost; F = Goals scored; A = Goals conceded; GD = Goals difference; Pts = Points gained

== Honours ==
Maruyasu Okazaki honours
Honour	No.	Years
Aichi Prefectural Football Championship (Emperor's Cup Aichi Prefectural Qualifiers)	5	2003, 2015, 2017, 2020, 2023
Tokai Soccer League Division 2	1	2004
Tokai Soccer League Division 1	1	2013

== Current squad ==
As of 6 April 2024. Note: Flags indicate national team as defined under FIFA eligibility rules; some limited exceptions apply. Players may hold more than one non-FIFA nationality.

No.	Pos.	Nation	Player
1	GK	JPN	Shoa Onishi
2	DF	JPN	Yusei Ichikawa
3	DF	JPN	Natsuki Takeda
4	DF	JPN	Koki Kuwamoto
5	DF	JPN	Masayuki Tokutake
6	MF	JPN	Masataka Nishimoto
7	MF	JPN	Jin Shioya
8	MF	JPN	Kazuya Oguri
9	FW	JPN	Hiroki Maeda
10	DF	JPN	Takumi Okabe
11	FW	JPN	Yuhi Hayashi
13	MF	JPN	Koki Aoshima
14	MF	JPN	Yuki Mizutani
15	DF	JPN	Satoshi Fujihashi
16	MF	JPN	Wataru Sasaki

No.	Pos.	Nation	Player
17	MF	JPN	Jin Wakatsuki
18	FW	JPN	Koya Hakamata
19	MF	JPN	Hayato Kato
20	MF	JPN	Komei Kikuchi
21	GK	JPN	Sora Kitagawa
22	DF	JPN	Rai Watanabe
23	MF	JPN	Hitoshi Nishimura
24	MF	JPN	Kazuma Eguchi
25	DF	JPN	Yusuke Murase
26	MF	JPN	Kotaro Hara
27	FW	JPN	Talla Ndao (on loan from FC Osaka)
28	MF	JPN	Yuki Yamada
30	DF	JPN	Haruki Matsui (on loan from FC Imabari)
32	MF	JPN	Yuta Murase
41	GK	JPN	Eitaro Tsunoi

== Club officials ==
Position	Staff
Manager	(Japan) Hiroyasu Ibata
Assistant manager	(Japan) Masashi Seki (Japan) Minoru Okada (Japan) Mitsuyuki Yoshihiro
Goalkeeper coach	(Japan) Takeshi Kawaguchi
Athletic trainers	(Japan) Keisuke Suzuki (Japan) Masaya Yamamoto

== Managerial history ==
Manager	Nationality	Tenure	
Manager	Nationality	Start	Finish
Yasuhiro Yamamura	Japan	1 January 2014	31 December 2016
Motomasa Oe	Japan	1 January 2017	22 August 2017
Ryūji Kitamura	Japan	23 August 2017	31 July 2021
Hiroyasu Ibata	Japan	1 August 2021	Current
