= Veertien Mie =

Japanese football club

Veertien Mie ヴィアティン三重
- Full name: Veertien Mie
- Founded: 2012; 14 years ago
- Stadium: La Pita Toin Stadium; Yokkaichi Central Greenery Stadium
- Capacity: 5,142; 10,000
- Chairman: Daisuke Gotō
- Manager: Shuichi Mase
- League: Japan Football League
- 2025: 7th of 16
- Website: veertien.jp/fc
Home colours	Away colours

Veertien Mie (ヴィアティン三重, Viatin Mie) is a Japanese football club based between Kuwana and Yokkaichi, Mie Prefecture. They currently play in the fourth-tier Japan Football League.

== History ==
"Veertien" means "fourteen" in Dutch, after Johan Cruijff's playing number. As with V-Varen Nagasaki, their colours are orange with traces of blue. Founded as Veertien FC in 2012 to bring a team from Mie Prefecture to professional football in Japan, Doru Isac was invited to overview the activities at the club. After using the name Veertien Kuwana for two seasons from 2013, they converted the identity from the 2015 season to Veertien Mie.

Results came rapidly, since the club was able to clinch five promotions in a row, from the 3rd division of the Mie Prefectural League to the Japan Football League for the 2017 season. They also featured in one edition of the Emperor's Cup, reaching the 2nd round in 2014 and losing to Cerezo Osaka only after extra time.

== League and cup record ==
Champions	Runners-up	Third place	Promoted	Relegated

League														Emperor's Cup	Shakaijin Cup
Season	League	Tier	Teams	Pos.	P	W	D	L	F	A	GD	Pts	Attendance/G	Emperor's Cup	Shakaijin Cup
2012	Mie Prefectural; League Division 3	8	-	2nd	10	6	2	2	32	13	19	20		Did not qualify	Not eligible
Veertien Kuwana
2013	Mie Prefectural; League Division 2	7	8	2nd	14	12	2	0	76	6	70	38		Did not qualify	Not eligible
2014	Mie Prefectural; League Division 1	7	8	1st	14	12	2	0	107	9	98	38		2nd round	Not eligible
Veertien Mie
2015	Tōkai Adult Soccer; League (Div. 2)	6	8	1st	14	12	1	1	61	8	53	37		Did not qualify	1st round
2016	Tōkai Adult Soccer; League (Div. 1)	5	8	3rd	14	9	3	2	43	18	25	30		Did not qualify	3rd
2017	JFL	4	16	12th	30	7	8	15	35	46	-11	29	792	Did not qualify	Not eligible
2018	JFL	4	16	11th	30	9	8	13	40	52	-12	35	849	Did not qualify	Not eligible
2019	JFL	4	16	10th	30	10	9	11	38	34	4	39	1,040	3rd round	Not eligible
2020	JFL	4	16	6th	15	6	3	6	17	16	1	21	925	Not eligible	Not eligible
2021	JFL	4	17	11th	32	10	10	12	40	43	-3	40	605	Did not qualify	Not eligible
2022	JFL	4	16	7th	30	12	9	9	43	29	14	45	1,779	Did not qualify	Not eligible
2023	JFL	4	15	10th	28	9	8	11	35	32	3	35	1,338	2nd round	Not eligible
2024	JFL	4	16	5th	30	13	9	8	41	33	8	48	2,071	2nd round	Not eligible
2025	JFL	4	16	7th	30	11	12	7	38	25	13	45	2,249	2nd round	Not eligible
2026–27	JFL	4	16	TBD	30									TBD	Not eligible

Key

- Pos. = Position in league; P = Games played; W = Games won; D = Games drawn; L = Games lost; F = Goals scored; A = Goals conceded; GD = Goal difference; Pts= Points gained
- Attendance/G = Average league home attendance

== Honours ==
Veertien Mie Honours
Honour	No.	Years
Mie Prefectural League Division 1	1	2014
Mie Prefectural Football Championship Emperor's Cup Mie Prefectural Qualifiers	4	2014, 2019, 2023, 2024, 2025
Tōkai Adult Soccer League Division 2	1	2015

== Coaching staff ==
Position	Staff
Manager	(Japan) Shuichi Mase
Assistant manager	(Japan) Akihiro Kakinuma
Coach and analyst	(Japan) Koto Gunji
Goalkeeper coach	(Japan) Kazuki Kishigami
Athletic trainer	(Japan) Yasuke Abe
Chief doctor	(Japan) Yoshiyuki Senga
Doctor	(Japan) Yusuke Kuroda (Japan) Fumihiro Nishimura (Japan) Hiroki Yamazaki
Competent	(Japan) Taishi Mochizuki

== Managerial history ==
As of the February 2022

Manager	Nationality	Tenure	
Manager	Nationality	Start	Finish
Eishi Kaizu	Japan	1 February 2014	31 December 2019
Nobuhiro Ueno	Japan	1 February 2019	21 June 2021
Yoshihiko Yamamoto	Japan	22 June 2021	31 January 2022
Yasuhiro Higuchi	Japan	1 February 2022	31 January 2024
Shuichi Mase	Japan	1 February 2024	Current

== Kit evolution ==
Home Kits - 1st
2016	2017	2018	2019	2020
2021	2022	2023	2024	2025 -

Away Kits - 2nd
2016	2017	2018	2019	2020
2021	2022	2023	2024	2025 -
