= Ryuji Kitamura =

Japanese footballer and manager

Ryuji Kitamura 北村 隆二
Personal information
- Full name: Ryuji Kitamura
- Date of birth: March 15, 1981 (age 45)
- Place of birth: Zushi, Kanagawa, Japan
- Height: 1.74 m (5 ft 8 1/2 in)
- Position: Midfielder

Youth career
- 1996–1998: Zuyo High School
- 1999–2002: Aoyama Gakuin University

Senior career*
Years	Team	Apps	(Gls)
2003–2004	Nagoya Grampus Eight	0	(0)
2005–2008	FC Gifu	83	(1)
2009–2012	Matsumoto Yamaga FC	75	(2)
Total		158	(3)

Managerial career
- 2018–: FC Maruyasu Okazaki
- * Club domestic league appearances and goals

Ryuji Kitamura (北村 隆二, Kitamura Ryūji; born March 15, 1981) is a Japanese former football player.

== Club statistics ==
Club performance			League		Cup		League Cup		Total	
Season	Club	League	Apps	Goals	Apps	Goals	Apps	Goals	Apps	Goals
Japan			League		Emperor's Cup		J.League Cup		Total	
2003	Nagoya Grampus Eight	J1 League	0	0	0	0	0	0	0	0
2004	Nagoya Grampus Eight	J1 League	0	0	0	0	1	0	1	0
2005	FC Gifu	Regional Leagues	10	0	-		-		10	0
2006	FC Gifu	Regional Leagues	7	0	0	0	-		7	0
2007	FC Gifu	Football League	31	1	2	0	-		33	1
2008	FC Gifu	J2 League	35	0	2	0	-		37	0
2009	Matsumoto Yamaga FC	Regional Leagues	13	1	1	0	-		14	1
2010	Matsumoto Yamaga FC	Football League								
Total			96	2	5	0	1	0	102	2
