= Penalty (brand) =

Brazilian sports brand

- Type: Sociedade Anônima
- Traded as: B3: CAMB3
- Industry: Sporting goods
- Founded: 1970; 56 years ago
- Headquarters: São Roque, Brazil
- Key people: Eduardo Estefano (Executive Director)
- Products: Athletic shoes, apparel, sports equipment, accessories
- Revenue: ▼US$133.7 million (2012)
- Net income: ▼US$6.0 million (2012)
- Number of employees: 2,500
- Website: penalty.com.br

Penalty (B3: CAMB4) is a Brazilian sporting goods manufacturer that was established in 1970 in São Paulo. The brand is operated by its owner and creator, Grupo Cambucci.

The company manufactures mainly soccer equipment such as kit uniforms and balls.

== History ==
In 1945, the Assibe Brothers founded "Malharia Cambuci SA", a company of clothing for men and women in São Paulo. In 1970, the company created the brand "Penalty," launching products for the football market.

In the 1980s, Penalty became the largest Brazilian manufacturer of soccer balls. During this period, Penalty acquired the manufacturing rights for Asics shoes and Wilson tennis racquets. During the 1990s, the Brazilian football teams of São Paulo and Grêmio wore uniforms by Penalty.

In 1998, the brand expanded its business to Argentina, opening a filial of the company there and signing deals with some local teams.

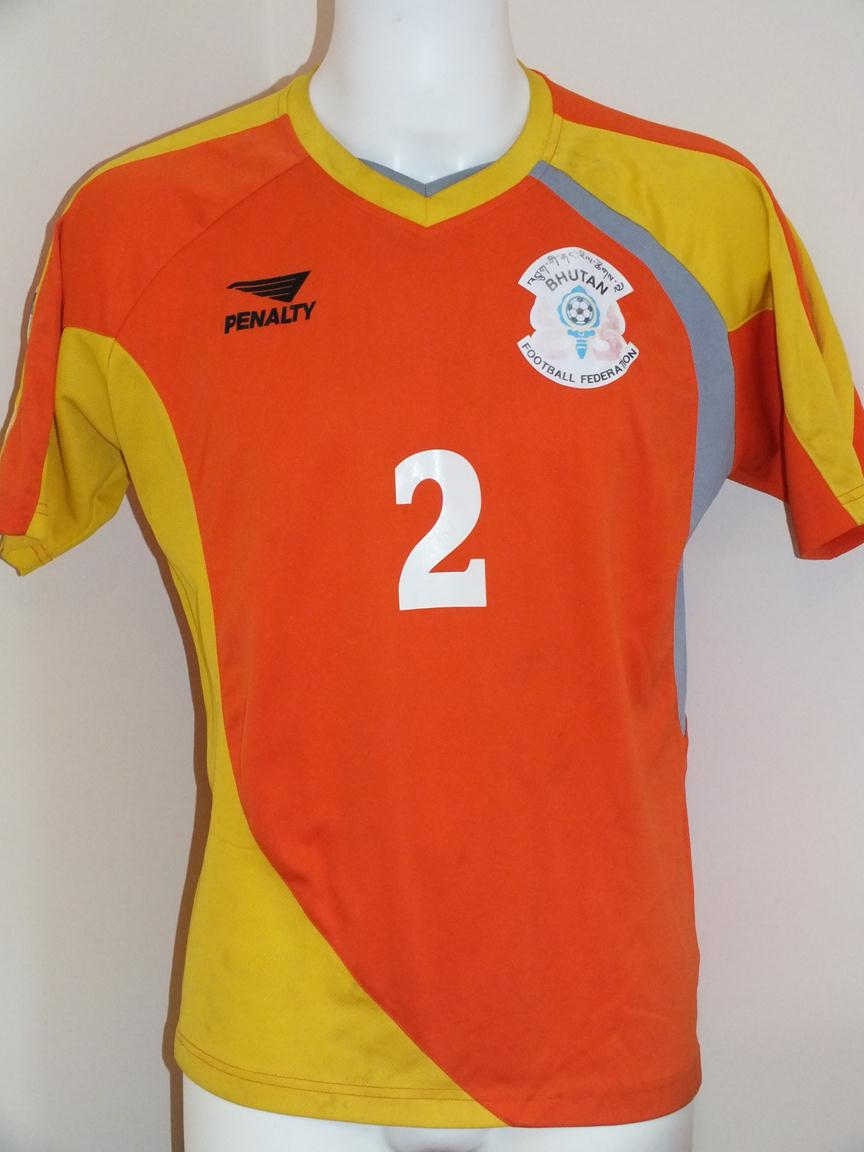
Official Bhutan home shirt from 2010 made by Penalty

In 2010, Penalty started sponsoring the Spanish Futsal League, and, one year later, the company signed an exclusive agreement with Víctor Valdés, the football goalkeeper of Barcelona FC and Spanish national team, for whom Penalty designed an exclusive boot.

== Present sponsorships ==
=== Association football ===
==== Club teams ====
- (Japan) AC Nagano Parceiro
- (Japan) Fagiano Okayama
- (Japan) Montedio Yamagata
- (Japan) Shonan Bellmare
- (Japan) YSCC Yokohama
- (Czech Republic) Povltavská F.A.

== Past sponsorships ==
=== Association football ===
==== Associations ====
- (Bolivia) FBF
- (Uruguay) AUF

==== National teams ====
- Bhutan (2010)
- Bolivia (1977–79, 1983–86)
- Peru (1981–1982)

==== Club teams ====
- (Argentina) Banfield (2014–2018)
- (Argentina) Gimnasia y Esgrima (2011–2017)
- (Argentina) Sarmiento (1995–96, 2016–19)
- (Argentina) Talleres de Córdoba (1994–95, 2005–08, 2011–19)
- (Brazil) Ceará
- (Brazil) Vitória
- (Brazil) Figueirense (2012–2014)
- (Brazil) Uberaba
- (Brazil) Grêmio (1987–1999)
- (Brazil) Joinville (1997–2000)
- (Brazil) Paraná (2007–09)
- (Brazil) Paysandu (1979–91, 1997–2001)
- (Brazil) Santa Cruz (2009–2017)
- (Brazil) São Paulo (1974-77, 1991–95, 2000–02)
- (Japan) Nagano Parceiro Ladies (2016–2021)
- (Japan) Blaublitz Akita (2013–2014)
- (Japan) FC Maruyasu Okazaki (2016–2018)
- (Japan) Kawasaki Frontale (1997–1998)
- (Japan) Shonan Bellmare (2012–2026)
- (Japan) Tegevajaro Miyazaki (2015–2020)
- (Japan) V-Varen Nagasaki (2012–2013)
- (India) Chennai City FC (2018–2019)

==== Players ====
- (Brazil) Alex
- (Spain) Víctor Valdés
- (Uruguay) Sergio Migliaccio

=== Futsal ===
==== National Teams ====
- Brazil

==== Club teams ====
- (Brazil) Intelli (1986–1987, 2004–2005, 2013–2018)

=== Volleyball ===
==== Association ====
- (Paraguay) Paraguayan Volleyball Federation (FPV)
- (Uruguay) Uruguayan Volleyball Federation (FUV)

==== Club teams ====
- (Brazil) Associação Social e Esportiva Sada
