= Yōsuke Miyaji =

Japanese footballer

Yosuke Miyaji 宮路 洋輔
Personal information
- Full name: Yosuke Miyaji
- Date of birth: 12 June 1987 (age 39)
- Place of birth: Miyazaki, Japan
- Height: 1.77 m (5 ft 9 1/2 in)
- Position: Defender

Team information
- Current team: Minebea Mitsumi (manager)

Youth career
- 2006–2009: Fukuoka University

Senior career*
Years	Team	Apps	(Gls)
2010–2012	Avispa Fukuoka	22	(0)
2013–2020	Honda Lock	69	(6)
Total		91	(6)

Managerial career
- 2020: Honda Lock (Assistant manager)
- 2020–: Minebea Mitsumi
- * Club domestic league appearances and goals as of 9 February 2025

Yosuke Miyaji (宮路 洋輔, Miyaji Yōsuke; born June 12, 1987) is a Japanese football manager and former player and currently manager of Japan Football League club, Minebea Mitsumi.

== Career ==
Miyaji was announcement officially retirement at the end 2019 season after 10 years career as professional football.

== Managerial career ==
In 2020, Miyaji was announcement officially appointment assistant manager of Minebea Mitsumi. Five months later, he was appointed as manager after dismissal of Shinya Shirakawa in June 2020.

== Career statistics ==
=== Club ===
Appearances and goals by club, season and competition
Club	Season	League			Emperor's Cup		J.League Cup		Total	
Club	Season	Division	Apps	Goals	Apps	Goals	Apps	Goals	Apps	Goals
Avispa Fukuoka	2010	J2 League	17	0	1	0	–		18	0
Avispa Fukuoka	2011	J1 League	3	0	1	0	0	0	4	0
Avispa Fukuoka	2012	J1 League	2	0	0	0	–		2	0
Honda Lock	2013	Japan Football League	20	3	0	0	–		20	3
Honda Lock	2014	Japan Football League	21	1	2	0	–		23	1
Honda Lock	2015	Japan Football League	28	2	0	0	–		28	2
Honda Lock	2016	Japan Football League	18	2	1	0	–		19	2
Honda Lock	2017	Japan Football League	28	5	0	0	–		28	5
Honda Lock	2018	Japan Football League	18	1	0	0	–		18	1
Honda Lock	2019	Japan Football League	16	0	0	0	–		16	0
Career total			171	14	5	0	0	0	176	14

== Managerial statistics ==
As of the start for 2025 season.

Team	From	To	Record				
Team	From	To	G	W	D	L	Win %
Minebea Mitsumi	2020	present	141	38	33	70	26.95
Total			141	38	33	70	26.95
