= J.League 100 Year Plan club status =

Status given to Japanese amateur football clubs

J.League 100 Year Plan club status, Jei Rīgu hyakunen kōsō kurabu (Jリーグ百年構想クラブ) is a status given to Japanese non-league football clubs. The applicant must have an intention to become a professional club and in the top three levels of the Japanese football pyramid. Usually clubs from the fourth level, Japan Football League, apply for the status; however, it is open for all clubs down to prefectural leagues. From the 2014 to 2022 seasons, the associate membership was the main criteria for J3 promotion.

== Former associate membership systems ==
=== 1993–1998 ===
Originally, when the professional league was formed in 1993 with ten clubs, the league's intention was to keep the number of clubs to 10 for at least two to three years, and then gradually increase the roster to 16 by adding a club or two in year-to-year basis. However, the league had underestimated the demands; there were far more clubs seeking top-flight football then the league have anticipated. Thus, the league adopted associate membership system for the clubs in then the second-tier Japan Football League. Just like the current system, associate clubs finishing in the top two were allowed to be promoted to the league, given that they have passed the final inspection by the league. Associate members also had the right to participate in Yamazaki Nabisco Cup games and reserve league games.

This system was abolished in 1998 with the establishment of J.League Division 2 and the dissolution of the old JFL. Three remaining associate members were admitted to the J2 and Honda FC decided to maintain amateur status and joined the newly created JFL.

Year applied	Club name	Year admitted to J.League	Notes
1993	Bellmare Hiratsuka	1994	Promoted to J.League. Former JSL Division 1 champion.
1993	Júbilo Iwata	1994	Promoted to J.League. Former JSL Division 1 champion.
1993	Kashiwa Reysol	1995	Promoted to J.League. Former JSL Division 1 champion.
1994	Cerezo Osaka	1995	Promoted to J.League. Former JSL Division 1 champion.
1994	Kyoto Purple Sanga	1996	Promoted to J.League
1994	Tosu Futures	1999 (J2)	Taken over by Sagan Tosu. Admitted to J2. Promoted to J1 in 2012
1995	Avispa Fukuoka	1996	Promoted to J.League
1995	Vissel Kobe	1997	Promoted to J.League
1996	Consadole Sapporo	1998	Promoted to J.League. Competed in JSL Division 1 between 1989 and 1992.
1996	Brummell Sendai	1999 (J2)	Admitted to J2 as Vegalta Sendai. Promoted to Division 1 in 2002
1997	Kawasaki Frontale	1999 (J2)	Admitted to J2. Promoted to Division 1 in 2000. Competed in JSL Division 1 between 1977 and 1978.
1997	Honda Motors	–	Withdrew membership due to lack of support from company and community. Competed in JSL Division 1 between 1981 and 1992.

=== 2006–2013 ===
After its establishment in 1999, J.League Division 2 became the frontier of J.League expansion, feeding from the simultaneously established Japan Football League. In their first seven years of co-existence, every club that applied for promotion was individually examined by the league. Five teams were promoted this way, but as the number of applicants increased over time, in October 2005 the JFA initiated the establishment of the new association membership system in order to provide an incentive for amateur clubs to obtain a sound economical and business basis necessary to J.League membership.

The criteria for such membership were developed by joint JFA–J.League committee in early 2006. They covered various aspects of the club development, with the particular stress on organizational stability, adequate infrastructure, and support from the local government, sponsors, and community. Unlike the previous system, this membership has been targeted not only to JFL clubs, but to all amateurs club in the football pyramid, including regional and prefectural leagues.

Below is a list of criteria for associate membership in their last edition of September 1, 2012.

Club organization

- Must be organized as a public corporation or NPO solely devoted to football.
  - Company and university clubs do not qualify
  - At least half of the shares of stock must be Japanese ownership
- Must hire at least three administrative employees, one of which must be in a managerial position.
- Must have a proper payroll system in accordance with Japanese law.
- Must complete an annual tax audit.
- Must be financially feasible.

(Note: The league recommends ¥1.5 million of capital by promotion to J2 and 5 million by the end of the third year in J2.)

- Must secure sponsorship of at least ¥1 million.

Home town

- Must be approved by respective prefectural football association.
- Must be approved by the home town's government in writing.

Home stadium/training facility

- It must have a capacity of at least 10,000 and a natural grass pitch (in lieu of this, the club must have plans to build a stadium with these minimum requirements).
- It must be located in the proposed hometown.
- It must have a press box and a conference room for pre- and post-match news conferences.
- The club must secure training facilities within the proposed hometown.

Others

- The club must currently play in JFL, a regional league, or a prefectural league.
- The club must aim for admission to J.League.
- The club must have plans for a youth system.

The new associate membership system lasted for eight years and came to its logical finish after the number of J2 clubs reached 22 (the original target) in 2012 season. The next year saw the establishment of J3 League which incorporated most of the remaining associate members.

Since 2006, 29 clubs have applied for the J.League associate member status and 25 have received it, though for many clubs more than one application was necessary. Of those 25 that received the status, 11 were promoted to J2; 9 more were admitted to J3 League in 2013; and 5 remaining members (along with three pending applications) transitioned to the new 100 Year Plan status in 2014. The table below summarizes the history of associate membership applications and J.League promotions/admissions. Promotions listed were to J2, unless indicated otherwise.

- Grey – membership declined
- Light green – remaining members, transformed into a 100 Year Plan status in 2014

Applied	Club name	League^{†}	Home town	Application results	Year admitted to J.League	Notes
August 2006	Rosso Kumamoto	JFL	Kumamoto, Kumamoto	Approved	2007	Promoted to J2 as Roasso Kumamoto.
August 2006	Tochigi SC	JFL	Utsunomiya, Tochigi	Declined		Reapplied in January 2007
January 2007	FC Gifu	JFL	Gifu, Gifu	Approved	2007	Promoted to J2, approved conditionally at first (financial improvement required before promotion).
January 2007	Gainare Tottori	JFL	All cities/towns in Tottori	Approved	2010	Promoted to J2.
January 2007	Tochigi SC	JFL	Utsunomiya, Tochigi	Approved	2008	Promoted to J2.
January 2007	Perada Fukushima	Tohoku League D2	Fukushima, Fukushima	Declined		Renamed as Fukushima United FC. Reapplied in June 2013
July 2007	Fagiano Okayama	Chugoku League	All cities/towns in Okayama	Approved	2008	Promoted to J2. First club to be approved while in regional league. Promoted to J1 in 2024.
January 2008	New Wave Kitakyushu	JFL	Kitakyushu, Fukuoka	Approved	2009	Promoted to J2 as Giravanz Kitakyushu.
January 2008	Kataller Toyama	JFL	Toyama, Toyama	Approved	2008	Promoted to J2.
January 2008	FC Ryukyu	JFL	All cities/towns in Okinawa	Declined		Reapplied in January 2011
January 2009	Machida Zelvia	JFL	Machida, Tokyo	Approved	2011	Promoted to J2. Relegated to JFL in 2012 and re-admitted to J3 in 2013. Promoted to J1 in 2023.
January 2009	V-Varen Nagasaki	JFL	All cities/towns in Nagasaki	Approved	2012	Promoted to J2. Promoted to J1 in 2017.
January 2010	Matsumoto Yamaga	JFL	Matsumoto, Nagano	Approved	2011	Promoted to J2. Promoted to J1 in 2014, first club to reach J1 from 100 Year Plan system.
January 2010	SC Sagamihara	Kanagawa prefectural league D1	Sagamihara, Kanagawa	Approved	2013 (J3)	Admitted to J3. Promoted to J2 in 2020, first club to be approved while in a prefectural league.
April 2010	Zweigen Kanazawa	JFL	Kanazawa, Ishikawa	Not accepted		Incomplete documentation. Reapplied in January 2011
December 2010	Kamatamare Sanuki	JFL	All cities/towns in Kagawa	Approved	2013	Promoted to J2.
January 2011	FC Ryukyu	JFL	All cities/towns in Okinawa	Declined		Further improvement needed. Reapplied in June 2013
January 2011	Zweigen Kanazawa	JFL	Kanazawa, Ishikawa	Declined		Further improvement needed. Reapplied in November 2012
November 2011	Nagano Parceiro	JFL	Nagano, Nagano	Approved	2013 (J3)	Admitted to J3.
November 2012	Zweigen Kanazawa	JFL	All cities/towns in Ishikawa	Approved	2013 (J3)	Admitted to J3. Promoted to J2 in 2014
November 2012	Blaublitz Akita	JFL	All cities/towns in Akita	Approved	2013 (J3)	Admitted to J3. Promoted to J2 in 2020
June 2013	Veertien Kuwana	Mie prefectural league D2	Kuwana, Mie	Not accepted		Incomplete documentation. Renamed as Veertien Mie, reapplied in December 2019 after introduction of 100 Year Plan status system; the status was granted in February 2020 and withdrawn in February 2023
June 2013	YSCC Yokohama	JFL	Yokohama, Kanagawa	Approved	2013 (J3)	Admitted to J3. Relegated to the JFL in 2024.
June 2013	Grulla Morioka	Tohoku League D1	Morioka, Iwate	Approved	2013 (J3)	Admitted to J3; only associate member to be admitted directly from regional leagues without JFL participation. Promoted to J2 in 2022, relegated to the JFL in 2024.
June 2013	Renofa Yamaguchi	Chūgoku League	All cities/towns in Yamaguchi	Approved		Promoted to J3 in 2014 and to J2 in 2015
June 2013	Fukushima United	JFL	Fukushima, Fukushima	Approved	2013 (J3)	Admitted to J3.
June 2013	FC Ryukyu	JFL	All cities/towns in Okinawa	Approved	2013 (J3)	Admitted to J3. Promoted to J2 in 2018.
June 2013	Fujieda MYFC	JFL	Fujieda, Shizuoka	Approved	2013 (J3)	Admitted to J3. Promoted to J2 in 2022.
June 2013	Vanraure Hachinohe	Tohoku League D1	Hachinohe, Aomori	Approved		Promoted to J3 in 2018
June 2013	Tonan Maebashi	Kantō League	Maebashi, Gunma	Approved → Withdrawn		On 30 July 2019, the club gave up the J.League 100 Year Plan club status.
June 2013	Azul Claro Numazu	Tōkai League	Numazu, Shizuoka	Approved		Promoted to J3 in 2016
June 2013	Nara Club	Kansai League D1	Nara, Nara	Approved		Promoted to J3 in 2022
June 2013	MIO Biwako Shiga	JFL	Kusatsu, Shiga	Frozen		Application not followed up after introduction of 100 Year Plan status system. Renamed as Reilac Shiga in 2023
June 2013	Tochigi Uva	JFL	Tochigi, Tochigi	Pending		Application transitioned to 100 Year Plan status; the status was granted in May 2014
June 2013	Suzuka Rampole	Tōkai League	Suzuka, Mie	Pending		Renamed as Suzuka Point Getters, reapplied in December 2020 after introduction of 100 Year Plan status system; the status was granted in February 2021 and revoked in June 2022

^{†} Listed is the league the club participated at the time of application, not necessary the league that the club currently belongs to.

== 100 Year Plan status (since 2014) ==
For a short time after the establishment of J3 League in 2014, the league designated J3 clubs as "associate members", as opposed to "full members" of J1 and J2. In order to avoid confusion, it was decided to change the name of the latter to "100 Year Plan" status. The J.League later abolished the associate membership naming for J3 clubs, but the new name for future members remained.

=== Participation criteria ===
The criteria for the 100 Year Plan status are largely similar to associate membership of the past, though they are generally more relaxed because of less strict regulations for J3 participation in comparison with J2. Below are the criteria for the 2014 season.

Club organization

- Must be organized as a public corporation or NPO solely devoted to football and exist in this status for no less than one year
  - The majority of the shares or stock must be Japanese owned
- Must employ at least four administrative employees, one of whom must have managerial position
- Must have proper payroll system according to Japanese law
- Must have proper financial management and conduct annual tax audit
- Must hold intellectual rights for the club name, logo, and all associated trademarks

Home town and stadium/training facility

- Must be approved by respective Prefectural Football Association
- Must be approved by the hometown government in writing
- Home stadium must be located in the proposed hometown
- Must secure training facilities within the proposed hometown

Others

- Must currently play in JFL, regional league or prefectural league
- Must aim for eventual admission to J.League
- Must have a working soccer school/youth system that exists for no less than one year

=== Criteria for J3 promotion ===
The 100 Year Plan status alone was only a prerequisite for J3 promotion until the condition of holding it to apply for a league license was repealed in January 2023 as part of revisions to J3's club licensing regulations. The club must still comply with the following requirements in order to receive the J3 license necessary for promotion.

- Must have a stadium that complies with J3 standards (capacity 2,000 or above) and passes the league examination
- Must pass a J3 licensing examination by the league
- Must finish within top two of the JFL
- Must have average attendance of home games no less than 2,000 spectators in the prior season, with significant effort recognized to reach that number
- Must make efforts to develop a stable support organization in the year immediately before joining
- Must be deemed an appropriate J3 member by the board of directors based on club activities

=== Application history ===
- Green – promoted to J.League
- Gold – current members
- Grey – membership declined
- White – application pending or membership withdrawn

Applied	Club name	League^{†}	Home town	Application results	Year admitted to J.League	Notes
June 2014	Renofa Yamaguchi	Chūgoku League	All cities/towns in Yamaguchi	Approved	2014	Promoted to J3 and in 2015 to J2. Former associate member. Relegated to J3 in 2025.
June 2014	Vanraure Hachinohe	Tohoku League D1	Hachinohe, Aomori	Approved	2018	Promoted to J3 and in 2025 to J2. Former associate member
June 2014	Azul Claro Numazu	Tōkai League	Numazu, Shizuoka	Approved	2016	Promoted to J3. Former associate member. Relegated to JFL in 2025.
June 2014	Nara Club	Kansai League D1	Nara, Nara	Approved	2022	Promoted to J3. Former associate member.
June 2014	Tochigi Uva	JFL	Tochigi, Tochigi	Approved	2024	Application transitioned from associate membership; renamed Tochigi City FC, withdrew membership on 19 December 2023. Promoted to J3 and in 2025 to J2.
November 2014	Kagoshima United	JFL	Kagoshima, Kagoshima	Approved	2015	Promoted to J3 and in 2018, 2023 to J2.
November 2015	Tokyo Musashino City	JFL	Musashino, Tokyo	Approved		On 31 July 2020, Musashino relinquished its 100 Year Plan status. On December 2023, Musashino reverted to their former corporate ownership by Yokogawa Electric.
November 2015	FC Imabari	Shikoku League	Imabari, Ehime	Approved	2019	Promoted to J3 and in 2024 to J2.
November 2018	Tegevajaro Miyazaki	JFL	Miyazaki, Miyazaki	Approved	2020	Promoted to J3 and in 2025 to J2.
November 2018	ReinMeer Aomori	JFL	Aomori, Aomori	Approved		On 31 January 2023, Aomori withdrew their membership.
November 2019	FC Osaka	JFL	Higashiosaka, Osaka	Approved	2022	Promoted to J3.
November 2019	Veertien Mie	JFL	Kuwana & Yokkaichi, Mie	Approved		On 22 February 2023, Veertien withdrew their membership.
November 2019	Iwaki FC	JFL	Iwaki, Fukushima	Approved	2021	Promoted to J3 and in 2022 to J2. Former associate member
November 2019	Vonds Ichihara	Kantō League D1	Ichihara, Chiba	Approved		
November 2019	Nankatsu SC	Kantō League D1	Katsushika, Tokyo	Approved		
November 2020	Criacao Shinjuku	Kantō League D1	Shinjuku, Tokyo	Approved		
November 2020	Suzuka Point Getters	JFL	Suzuka, Mie	Approved		On 28 June 2022, Suzuka's 100 Year Plan status was revoked.
November 2020	Verspah Oita	JFL	Beppu & Yufu, Oita	Approved		On 25 April 2023, Verspah withdrew their membership.
November 2021	Cobaltore Onagawa	Tohoku League D1	Onagawa, Miyagi	Approved		Cobaltore withdrew their membership.
November 2021	Ococias Kyoto AC	Kansai League D1	Kyoto	Declined		Reapplied on 28 February 2022
November 2021	Kochi United	JFL	Kochi, Kochi	Approved	2024	On 31 January 2023, Kochi withdrew their membership. Promoted to J3.
November 2021	Okinawa SV	Kyushu League D1	Tomigusuku, Okinawa	Approved		On 25 July 2023, Okinawa withdrew their membership.
December 2021	Tokyo 23	Kantō League D1	Edogawa, Tokyo	Approved		
February 2022	Ococias Kyoto AC	Kansai League D1	Kyoto	Declined		

^{†} Listed is the league the club participated at the time of application, not necessary the league that the club currently belongs to.

Current members (current league in parentheses)

- Criacao Shinjuku (JFL)
- Nankatsu SC (Kantō League D1)
- Tokyo 23 (Kantō League D1)
- Vonds Ichihara (JFL)

Past members

- Azul Claro Numazu (JFL)
- Cobaltore Onagawa (Tohoku League D1)
- FC Imabari (J2)
- Iwaki FC (J2)
- Kagoshima United (J3)
- Kochi United SC (J3)
- Nara Club (J3)
- Okinawa SV (JFL)
- FC Osaka (J3)
- ReinMeer Aomori (JFL)
- Renofa Yamaguchi (J3)
- Suzuka Point Getters (JFL)
- Tegevajaro Miyazaki (J2)
- Tochigi City FC (J2)
- Tonan Maebashi (Kantō League D2)
- Vanraure Hachinohe (J2)
- Veertien Mie (JFL)
- Verspah Oita (JFL)
- Yokogawa Musashino FC (JFL)

== See also ==
- J.League
- Japan Football League
- Japanese association football league system
- List of football clubs in Japan
