= Hiroyasu Ibata =

Japanese footballer (born 1974)

Hiroyasu Ibata 井幡 博康
Personal information
- Full name: Hiroyasu Ibata
- Date of birth: June 25, 1974 (age 52)
- Place of birth: Sapporo, Hokkaido, Japan
- Height: 1.76 m (5 ft 9 1/2 in)
- Position: Midfielder

Youth career
- Muroran Otani High School

Senior career*
Years	Team	Apps	(Gls)
1994–1996	Nagoya Grampus Eight	0	(0)
1996–1999	Honda	42	(16)
2000–2001	JEF United Ichihara	20	(4)
Total		62	(20)

Managerial career
- 2014–2021: Honda
- 2021–: Maruyasu Okazaki
Medal record
Nagoya Grampus Eight
Runner-up	J1 League	1996
Winner	Emperor's Cup	1995
- * Club domestic league appearances and goals

Hiroyasu Ibata (井幡 博康, Ibata Hiroyasu; born June 25, 1974) is a former Japanese football player and manager and current manager of Japan Football League club Maruyasu Okazaki.

== Playing career ==
Ibata was born in Sapporo on June 25, 1974. After graduating from high school, he joined Nagoya Grampus Eight in 1994. However he could not play at all in the match until 1996. In 1996, he moved to Honda. He played many matches and he also scored 11 goals in 1999. In 2000, he moved to JEF United Ichihara. Although he played many matches in 2000, his opportunity to play decreased in 2001 and retired end of 2001 season.

== Coaching career ==
He coached high school and university team until 2012. In 2013, he signed with Zweigen Kanazawa and became a manager for youth team. In 2014, Ibata became a manager for Honda.

== Club statistics ==
Club performance			League		Cup		League Cup		Total	
Season	Club	League	Apps	Goals	Apps	Goals	Apps	Goals	Apps	Goals
Japan			League		Emperor's Cup		J.League Cup		Total	
1994	Nagoya Grampus Eight	J1 League	0	0	0	0	0	0	0	0
1995	Nagoya Grampus Eight	J1 League	0	0	0	0	-		0	0
1996	Nagoya Grampus Eight	J1 League	0	0	0	0	0	0	0	0
1996	Honda	Football League	4	0	2	0	-		6	0
1997	Honda	Football League	24	5	3	1	-		27	6
1998	Honda	Football League	0	0	0	0	-		0	0
1999	Honda	Football League	14	11	3	5	-		17	16
2000	JEF United Ichihara	J1 League	15	3	2	0	3	0	20	3
2001	JEF United Ichihara	J1 League	5	1	1	0	3	0	9	0
Total			62	20	11	6	6	0	79	26
