= 2022 All Japan Senior Football Championship =

Shakaijin Cup

Tournament details
- Country: Japan
- Dates: 14 October 2022 – 19 October 2022
- Teams: 32

Final positions
- Champions: Briobecca Urayasu (1st title)
- Runners-up: BTOP Thank Kuriyama

Tournament statistics
- Matches played: 32
- Goals scored: 79 (2.47 per match)
- Attendance: 2,806 (88 per match)
- Top goal scorer: Rai Ijuin (7 goals)

The 58th All Japan Senior Football Championship (Japanese: 第58回全国社会人サッカー選手権大会, Hepburn: Dai 58-kai zenkoku shakai hito sakkā senshuken taikai), officially the 2022 All Japan Adults Football Tournament, and most known as the 2022 Shakaijin Cup, was the first edition of the annually contested single-elimination tournament (or cup) since 2019. Both the 2020 and 2021 edition of the tournament was deemed cancelled due to the COVID-19 pandemic. The defending champions Tiamo Hirakata did not participate on this tournament. As it's restricted to non-league clubs (Participating on Regional or Prefectural Leagues; not included in the nationwide league competitions), they can't enter the competition as Tiamo played the 2022 season in the Japan Football League, Japan's 4th-tier league. All the matches were streamed in the "Shakaijin Cup" channel.

== Venues ==
The championship was organized by Japan Football Association, in collaboration with the All-Japan Football Federation and the city of Shibushi. The collaboration with the Kagoshima's city of Shibushi happened due to the 2023 National Sports Conference. The 2022 All Japan Senior Football Championship served as a rehearsal for the National Sports Conference, which was also held at Shibushi. The venues hosting the tournament was entirely centered on the Shibushi Sports Park, and on the Shiokaze Park.

== Holding method ==
Every match at the tournament were played under the unusual method of 40 minutes per half, instead of the usual 45, with every match being played under 80 minutes of action in total, excluding added times. The match would go directly to a penalty shoot-out, if the winner could not be decided after the full-time whistle. Up to five substitutions in three or less substitution breaks (excluding half-time) were allowed at the tournament, as per FIFA recommendation. Both methods are applied for the tournament due to the tiny 1-day interval between the matches, which could be even more tiring to the players in question if the matches had extra-time.

The top 3threeteams would qualify to play on the 2022 edition of the Japanese Regional Champions League, which serves as Japan Football League's play-off tournament. Since eight of the nine 2022 regional champions were already participating (Tōkai champions FC Kariya did not qualify) at the Shakaijin, and since clubs belonging to leagues below the main regional league tiers were not eligible for the Champions League, the top three teams did not necessarily mean the semi-finalists.

== Participating teams ==
Regional champions who were at the time already qualified for the Regional Champions League are denoted in bold. Lower-tier clubs who are not eligible to play in the Regional Champions League are denoted in italics.

Region	Slots	Team	Division (tier)
Kagoshima (Host)	1	NIFS Kanoya FC	Kyushu Soccer League (5)
Hokkaido	2	**BTOP Thank Kuriyama**	Hokkaido Soccer League (5)
Hokkaido	2	Hokkaido Tokachi Sky Earth	Hokkaido Soccer League (5)
Tohoku	2	**Cobaltore Onagawa**	Tohoku Soccer League (5)
Tohoku	2	Fuji Club 2003	Tohoku Soccer League (5)
Kantō	7	Briobecca Urayasu	Kantō Soccer League D1 (5)
Kantō	7	Joyful Honda Tsukuba	Kantō Soccer League D1 (5)
Kantō	7	Nankatsu SC	Kantō Soccer League D1 (5)
Kantō	7	**Tochigi City**	Kantō Soccer League D1 (5)
Kantō	7	Vonds Ichihara	Kantō Soccer League D1 (5)
Kantō	7	Aries Tokyo	Kantō Soccer League D2 (6)
Kantō	7	Toin University of Yokohama FC	Kantō Soccer League D2 (6)
Hokuriku/Shin'etsu	2	**Artista Asama**	Hokushin'etsu Football League (5)
Hokuriku/Shin'etsu	2	Fukui United	Hokushin'etsu Football League (5)
Tōkai	4	Chukyo Univ. FC	Tōkai Adult Soccer League (5)
Tōkai	4	Chukyo University	Tōkai Adult Soccer League (5)
Tōkai	4	Gakunan F. Mosuperio	Shizuoka Prefectural League (7)
Tōkai	4	SS Izu	Shizuoka Prefectural League (7)

Region	Slots	Team	Division (tier)
Kansai	5	**Arterivo Wakayama**	Kansai Soccer League D1 (5)
Kansai	5	Cento Cuore Harima	Kansai Soccer League D1 (5)
Kansai	5	Laranja Kyoto	Kansai Soccer League D1 (5)
Kansai	5	Ococias Kyoto	Kansai Soccer League D1 (5)
Kansai	5	Kansai FC 2008	Kansai Soccer League D2 (6)
Chugoku	3	Belugarosso Hamada	Chugoku Soccer League (5)
Chugoku	3	**Fukuyama City**	Chugoku Soccer League (5)
Chugoku	3	Mitsubishi Mizushima	Chugoku Soccer League (5)
Shikoku	2	Lvnirosso NC	Shikoku Soccer League (5)
Shikoku	2	**FC Tokushima**	Shikoku Soccer League (5)
Kyushu	4	J-Lease FC	Kyushu Soccer League (5)
Kyushu	4	Nobeoka Agata	Kyushu Soccer League (5)
Kyushu	4	**Okinawa SV**	Kyushu Soccer League (5)
Kyushu	4	Veroskronos Tsuno	Kyushu Soccer League (5)

== Schedule ==
The tournament schedule was officially released on 29 August 2022. The kick-off times are displayed in accordance with the Japan Standard Time (UTC+09:00).

=== Round of 32 ===
15 October 2022 Match 1	Ococias Kyoto	2−0	Chukyo University	Shibushi
10:30	Rikuto Sugiura 18'; Shota Hayashi 40'	Report (JFA); Report (JFA)		Stadium: Shibushi Sports Park Athletic Stadium; Attendance: 80; Referee: Ryo Ogawa

15 October 2022 Match 2	Joyful Honda Tsukuba	0−1	Hokkaido Tokachi Sky Earth	Shibushi
10:30		Report (JFA); Report (JFA)	Seiya Nawa 62'	Stadium: Shibushi Shiokaze Park A Attendance: 100; Referee: Ryo Kokubo

15 October 2022 Match 3	Veroskronos Tsuno	1−0	Fukuyama City	Shibushi
10:30	Kanta Kajiyama 51'	Report (JFA); Report (JFA)		Stadium: Shibushi Shiokaze Park B Attendance: 150; Referee: Rei Hosoya

15 October 2022 Match 4	Nankatsu SC	1−0	FC Tokushima	Shibushi
10:30	Deivisson 36'	Report (JFA); Report (JFA)		Stadium: Shibushi Shiokaze Park C Attendance: 200; Referee: Sho Takagi

15 October 2022 Match 5	Fuji Club 2003	0−4	Tochigi City	Shibushi
10:30		Report (JFA); Report (JFA)	Atsushi Yoshida 56'; Takafumi Shimizu 68'; Yuki Yamamura 72'; Genta Omotehara 80+3'	Stadium: Shibushi Sports Park Artificial Turf Field; Attendance: 30; Referee: Daisuke Teraoka

15 October 2022 Match 6	Gakunan F. Mosuperio	1−4	Cento Cuore Harima	Shibushi
10:30	Ryo Asahina 4'	Report (JFA); Report (JFA)	Yuki Matsumoto 15', 45'; Misaki Uemura 23'; Kohei Fujita 50'	Stadium: Shibushi Sports Park Fureai Square; Attendance: 70; Referee: Yuta Oho

15 October 2022 Match 7	Laranja Kyoto	0−0 (5–4 p)	Fukui United	Shibushi
13:00		Report (JFA); Report (JFA)		Stadium: Shibushi Sports Park Athletic Stadium; Attendance: 114; Referee: Kai Odo
	Penalties
	Hiroki Yamanaka (penalty scored); Junya Isobe (penalty scored); Toshiya Iizuka (penalty scored); Taiga Kawano (penalty scored); Kazuki Fukunaga (penalty scored)		Naohito Oku (penalty scored); Eiichiro Ozaki (penalty scored); Ryota Ikeniwa (penalty missed); Ryoto Ishizaka (penalty scored); Shohei Okuno (penalty scored)

15 October 2022 Match 8	Briobecca Urayasu	2−0	J-Lease FC	Shibushi
13:00	Taku Ikawa 34'; Daisuke Kato 51'	Report (JFA); Report (JFA)		Stadium: Shibushi Shiokaze Park A Attendance: 100; Referee: Masaaki Hiratsuka

15 October 2022 Match 9	BTOP Thank Kuriyama	1–1 (11–10 p)	Mitsubishi Mizushima	Shibushi
13:00	Yuichiro Edamoto 40+3'	Report (JFA); Report (JFA)	Shota Takase 66'	Stadium: Shibushi Shiokaze Park B Attendance: 50; Referee: Jumpei Sakata
	Penalties
	Ryosuke Ochi (penalty scored); Rai Anda (penalty scored); Shuto Kammera (penalty scored); Toyoki Yoshiyuki (penalty missed); Kodai Enomoto (penalty scored); Kakeru Kumagawa (penalty scored); Toshiya Motozuka (penalty scored); Kotaro Kawasato (penalty scored); Kutsuwada Kisa (penalty scored); Kenta Ito (penalty scored); Shun Sato (penalty scored); Ryosuke Ochi (penalty scored); Rai Anda (penalty scored)		Ryuji Miyazawa (penalty scored); Takuma Yasuda (penalty missed); Kazuma Saito (penalty scored); Nagi Kishimoto (penalty scored); Tatsuya Narumi (penalty scored); Ryusei Nomo (penalty scored); Riku Tanaka (penalty scored); Takayuki Tsurumaru (penalty scored); Tatsunori Maehara (penalty scored); Ryota Morisako (penalty scored); Motoki Uechi (penalty scored); Ryuji Miyazawa (penalty scored); Takuma Yasuda (penalty missed)

15 October 2022 Match 10	Toin University of Yokohama FC	0−1	Cobaltore Onagawa	Shibushi
13:00		Report (JFA); Report (JFA)	Ryota Kuroda 9'	Stadium: Shibushi Shiokaze Park C Attendance: 50; Referee: Kanto Onodera

15 October 2022 Match 11	Arterivo Wakayama	2−1	Aries Tokyo	Shibushi
13:00	Kengo Kubo 59'; Tomoya Seki 67'	Report (JFA); Report (JFA)	Masanori Abe 47'	Stadium: Shibushi Sports Park Artificial Turf Field; Attendance: 40; Referee: Shin Taguchi

15 October 2022 Match 12	NIFS Kanoya FC	3−4	Lvnirosso NC	Shibushi
13:00	Soshi Tabunoki 40+1'; Chikato Suzuki 42'; Haruto Suzuki 48'	Report (JFA); Report (JFA)	Shintaro Nakamura 36', 80+3'; Taiki Katsura 80+3'; Masaya Kokami 80+6'	Stadium: Shibushi Sports Park Fureai Square; Attendance: 90; Referee: Kentaro Kobayashi

15 October 2022 Match 13	Artista Asama	0−0 (3–4 p)	Vonds Ichihara	Shibushi
15:30		Report (JFA); Report (JFA)		Stadium: Shibushi Sports Park; Attendance: 100; Referee: Masaki Adachi
	Penalties
	Reo Nakajima (penalty scored); Tsubasa Iijima (penalty missed); Shunya Nakazawa (penalty scored); Toi Yamakose (penalty scored); Takahiro Kudo (penalty scored)		Hiroto Arai (penalty scored); Daiki Numa (penalty scored); Yuya Mitsunaga (penalty scored); Shohei Kiyohara (penalty missed); Justin Toshiki Kinjo (penalty missed)

15 October 2022 Match 14	Nobeoka Agata	4−0	Chukyo Univ. FC	Shibushi
15:30	Rai Ijuin 15'; Minato Kamei 26'; Kanji Murayama 40'; Yu Kuboki 69'	Report (JFA); Report (JFA)		Stadium: Shibushi Sports Park; Attendance: 120; Referee: Motoki Kato

15 October 2022 Match 15	Kansai FC 2008	3−2	Belugarosso Hamada	Shibushi
15:30	Keisuke Makiyama 18'; Hayato Miyatake 46'; Shintaro Kataoka 80+5'	Report (JFA); Report (JFA)	Ryotaro Fuke 21'; Kaisho Hirane 34'	Stadium: Shibushi Shiokaze Park C Attendance: 50; Referee: Tsukasa Sekine

15 October 2022 Match 16	SS Izu	0−2	Okinawa SV	Shibushi
15:30		Report (JFA); Report (JFA)	Naoya Okane 9'; Shuga Arai 68'	Stadium: Shibushi Sports Park Artificial Turf Field; Attendance: 120; Referee: Masaya Saito

=== Round of 16 ===
16 October 2022 Match 17	Ococias Kyoto	1−1 (4–2 p)	Hokkaido Tokachi Sky Earth	Shibushi
11:00	Shota Hayashi 80+3'	Report (JFA); Report (JFA)	Junki Yokono 67'	Stadium: Shibushi Shiokaze Park A Attendance: 120; Referee: Tomoaki Kitazawa
	Penalties
	Keiji Kagiyama (penalty scored); Shota Hayashi (penalty missed); Hideo Hashimoto (penalty scored); Seita Murai (penalty scored); Sasuga Kiyokawa (penalty scored)		Junki Yokono (penalty scored); Akira Takase (penalty missed); Tsukasa Shimomura (penalty scored); Ryuta Kizawa (penalty missed)

16 October 2022 Match 18	Veroskronos Tsuno	1−0	Nankatsu SC	Shibushi
11:00	Kenzo Taniguchi 17'	Report (JFA); Report (JFA)		Stadium: Shibushi Shiokaze Park B Attendance: 150; Referee: Masaaki Hiratsuka

16 October 2022 Match 19	Tochigi City	3−1	Cento Cuore Harima	Shibushi
11:00	Yuki Yamamura 34'; Ichiro Suzuki 41'; Akira Toshima 71'	Report (JFA); Report (JFA)	Yuki Matsumoto 8'	Stadium: Shibushi Shiokaze Park C Attendance: 50; Referee: Keisuke Hori

16 October 2022 Match 20	Laranja Kyoto	0−3	Briobecca Urayasu	Shibushi
11:00		Report (JFA); Report (JFA)	Taku Ikawa 27'; Shotaro Inoue 45'; Koyu Murakami 76'	Stadium: Shibushi Sports Park Artificial Turf Field; Attendance: 52; Referee: Kazuki Nakamura

16 October 2022 Match 21	BTOP Thank Kuriyama	3−0	Cobaltore Onagawa	Shibushi
13:30	Shuto Kammera 36'; Masahide Hiraoka 40+5'; Yuichiro Edamoto 57'	Report (JFA); Report (JFA)		Stadium: Shibushi Shiokaze Park A Attendance: 100; Referee: Shohei Ofuji

16 October 2022 Match 22	Arterivo Wakayama	1−0	Lvnirosso NC	Shibushi
13:30	Ryo Taguchi 49'	Report (JFA); Report (JFA)		Stadium: Shibushi Shiokaze Park B Attendance: 120; Referee: Masayasu Takashima

16 October 2022 Match 23	Vonds Ichihara	0−2	Nobeoka Agata	Shibushi
13:30		Report (JFA); Report (JFA)	Rai Ijuin 15'; Masaki Sakai 26'	Stadium: Shibushi Sports Park Artificial Turf Field; Attendance: 150; Referee: Yuki Tanabe

16 October 2022 Match 24	Kansai FC 2008	3−2	Okinawa SV	Shibushi
13:30	Sota Obuchi 11'; Hikaru Koinuma 13' (o.g.); Ryunosuke Tsushima 42'	Report (JFA); Report (JFA)	Yuta Yamada 28'; Yukihide Gibo 56'	Stadium: Shibushi Shiokaze Park C Attendance: 100; Referee: Tomomasa Toshiki

=== Quarter-finals ===
17 October 2022 Match 25	Ococias Kyoto	0−1	Veroskronos Tsuno	Shibushi
11:00		Report (JFA); Report (JFA)	Keita Sogabe 80+4'	Stadium: Shibushi Shiokaze Park A Attendance: 50; Referee: Kentaro Kobayashi

17 October 2022 Match 26	Tochigi City	1−2	Briobecca Urayasu	Shibushi
11:00	Akira Toshima 75'	Report (JFA); Report (JFA)	Shotaro Inoue 68'; Taku Ikawa 72'	Stadium: Shibushi Shiokaze Park C Attendance: 50; Referee: Masaki Adachi

17 October 2022 Match 27	BTOP Thank Kuriyama	1−1 (5–3 p)	Arterivo Wakayama	Shibushi
13:30	Toshiya Motozuka 44'	Report (JFA); Report (JFA)	Kazuki Shinohara 58'	Stadium: Shibushi Shiokaze Park A Attendance: 50; Referee: Ryo Ogawa
	Penalties
	Ryosuke Ochi (penalty scored); Rai Anda (penalty scored); Shuto Kammera (penalty scored); Kodai Enomoto (penalty scored); Toshiya Motozuka (penalty scored)		Shun Utsugi (penalty scored); Keisuke Okita (penalty missed); Yusei Ohashi (penalty scored); Kento Kato (penalty scored)

17 October 2022 Match 28	Nobeoka Agata	4−2	Kansai FC 2008	Shibushi
13:30	Rai Ijuin 22', 24', 54', 55'	Report (JFA); Report (JFA)	Keisuke Makiyama 68'; Hiroyuki Mao 80+3'	Stadium: Shibushi Shiokaze Park C Attendance: 100; Referee: Shohei Ofuji

=== Semi-finals ===
As BTOP Thank Kuriyama is already qualified to the 2022 Regional Champions League as Hokkaido champions, the other three semi-finalists have qualified for the Champions League.

18 October 2022 Match 29	Veroskronos Tsuno	0−1	Briobecca Urayasu	Shibushi
11:00		Report (JFA); Report (JFA)	Shotaro Inoue 71'	Stadium: Shibushi Shiokaze Park C Attendance: 50; Referee: Yuki Tanabe

18 October 2022 Match 30	BTOP Thank Kuriyama	2−2 (5–4 p)	Nobeoka Agata	Shibushi
13:30	Shuto Kammera 15'; Kutsuwada Kisa 45'	Report (JFA); Report (JFA)	Kanji Murayama 33'; Rai Ijuin 51'	Stadium: Shibushi Shiokaze Park C Attendance: 50; Referee: Kazuki Nakamura
	Penalties
	Ryosuke Ochi (penalty scored); Rai Anda (penalty scored); Kodai Enomoto (penalty scored); Kakeru Kumagawa (penalty scored); Toshiya Motozuka (penalty scored)		Rio Yoshitake (penalty scored); Ryushin Hisano (penalty scored); Masaki Sakai (penalty missed); Takuma Fukazawa (penalty scored); Kazumasa Noda (penalty scored)

=== Third-place match ===
19 October 2022 Match 31	Veroskronos Tsuno	0−1	Nobeoka Agata	Shibushi
10:00		Report (JFA); Report (JFA)	Masaya Inoue 22'	Stadium: Shibushi Sports Park Athletic Stadium; Attendance: 50; Referee: Daisuke Yamaguchi

=== Final ===
19 October 2022
12:30
Match 32

Briobecca Urayasu	0−0	BTOP Thank Kuriyama
	Report (JFA); Report (JFA)
Penalties
Tetta Kasashima (penalty scored); Taku Ikawa (penalty scored); Ryuto Koizumi (penalty scored); Daisuke Kato (penalty scored); Yuya Fujioka (penalty scored)	5–3	Ryosuke Ochi (penalty scored); Rai Anda (penalty missed); Shuto Kammera (penalty scored); Kakeru Kumagawa (penalty scored)

Shibushi Sports Park Athletic Stadium, Shibushi
Attendance: 100
Referee: Tomomasa Toshiki

BRIOBECCA
GK	16	(Japan) Koichi Sakuma
DF	4	(Japan) Yuya Fujioka
DF	9	(Japan) Ryosuke Iizawa	(substituted off) 68'
DF	23	(Japan) Shuji Uenaka
DF	26	(Japan) Tetta Kasashima
MF	5	(Japan) Yuto Takechi	(substituted off) 59'
MF	14	(Japan) Yo Uematsu (c)	(yellow card) 42' (substituted off) 75'
MF	27	(Japan) Kanji Hirano	(substituted off) 68'
MF	29	(Japan) Hiroki Ishihara
FW	11	(Japan) Koyu Murakami
FW	30	(Japan) Shotaro Inoue
Substitutes:
GK	25	(Japan) Yusuke Taniguchi
DF	13	(Japan) Ryuto Koizumi	(substituted in) 68'
DF	20	(Japan) Daisuke Kato	(substituted in) 75'
MF	18	(Japan) Ryo Togashi	(substituted in) 68'
MF	19	(Japan) Tsubasa Nihei
MF	32	(Japan) Taku Ikawa	(substituted in) 59'
FW	24	(Japan) Yohei Hayashi
Manager:
(Japan) Kei Shibata

BTOP
GK	30	(Japan) Shun Sato
DF	2	(Japan) Kakeru Kumagawa
DF	5	(Japan) Rai Anda
DF	11	(Japan) Kenta Ito
DF	13	(Japan) Kodai Enomoto
MF	7	(Japan) Toshiya Motozuka (c)
MF	16	(Japan) Yuichiro Edamoto	(substituted off) 61'
MF	34	(Japan) Kotaro Kawasato
FW	21	(Japan) Kutsuwada Kisa	(substituted off) 78'
FW	22	(Japan) Shuto Kammera
FW	77	(Japan) Masahide Hiraoka
Substitutes:
GK	36	(Japan) Masaya Tawarafuji
DF	3	(Japan) Asahi Ishiwata
DF	4	(Japan) Kento Mitsuo
MF	6	(Japan) Shunta Shimura
MF	19	(Japan) Ryosuke Ochi	(substituted in) 61'
MF	23	(Japan) Takuya Iwade
FW	24	(Japan) Toyoki Yoshiyuki	(substituted in) 78'
Manager:
(Japan) Yuta Sugiyama

Assistant referees:
Yuki Tanabe
Kazuki Nakamura
Fourth official:
Ryo Ogawa

Match rules

- 80 minutes.
- Penalty shoot-out if scores still level.
- Seven named substitutes.
- Maximum of five substitutions.

== See also ==
- 2022 J1 League
- 2022 J2 League
- 2022 J3 League
- 2022 Japanese Regional Leagues
- 2022 Emperor's Cup
- 2022 J.League Cup
- 2022-23 WE League
