= 2014 Emperor's Cup =

Tournament details
- Country: Japan
- Teams: 88

Final positions
- Champions: Gamba Osaka (4th title)
- Runners-up: Montedio Yamagata

Tournament statistics
- Matches played: 87

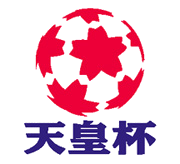
The logo of the emperor's cup transparent on PNG format.

The 94th Emperor's Cup (第94回天皇杯全日本サッカー選手権大会) was the regular edition of the annual Japanese national football cup tournament, which was held from 5 July 2014 to 13 December 2014

It was the first tournament since the 47th edition that the final match was not held on 1 January in the following year; it was moved to December due to the timing of the 2015 AFC Asian Cup in January 2015. It was also the first tournament since the 46th edition where the final match was not held at the National Stadium in Tokyo, due to major renovations that were scheduled in preparation for the 2020 Summer Olympics. Nissan Stadium in Yokohama was chosen as the venue for the 94th Final.

Normally, the winner would have qualified to the group stage of the 2015 AFC Champions League; however, Gamba Osaka had already qualified for this by virtue of being 2014 J.League Division 1 champions.

== Calendar ==
All dates are in 2014

| Round | Date | Matches | Clubs | New entries this round |
|---|---|---|---|---|
| First round | 5, 6 (26 (Note: only for match number 6, due to delay in prefectural qualifier of Hokkaido)) July | 24 | 47+1 → 24 | 47 prefectural cup winners; 1 2013 Emperor's Cup best amateur club |
| Second round | 12, 13 July (6 August (Note: only for match number 32, due to delay in match number 6, denoted above)) | 32 | 24+18+22 → 32 | 18 J1 clubs; 22 J2 clubs |
| Third round | 20 August | 16 | 32 → 16 | |
| Fourth round | 6, 7 (10 (Note: match day for J.League Division 1 clubs advanced to the quarter-finals of 2014 J.League Cup, as well as all clubs from J.League Division 2 and J3 League advanced to the quarter-finals)) September | 8 | 16 → 8 | |
| Quarter-finals | 11, 12 (15 (Note: match day for J.League Division 1 clubs advanced to the semifinals of 2014 J.League Cup, as well as all clubs from J.League Division 2 and J3 League advanced to the quarterfinals)) October | 4 | 8 → 4 | |
| Semi-finals | 26 November | 2 | 4 → 2 | |
| Final | 13 December | 1 | 2 → 1 | |

== Participating clubs ==
88 clubs compete in the tournament. The 18 clubs from 2014 J.League Division 1 and 22 clubs from 2014 J.League Division 2 receive a bye to the second round of the tournament. Due to the establishment of J3 League, one seeded spot is given to A.C. Nagano Parceiro, the best amateur club participated in 2013 Emperor's Cup, along with the other 47 teams earned berths by winning their respective prefectural cup tournaments, which 10 clubs from 2014 J3 League (all clubs except Nagano and J.League Under-22 Team) and 14 clubs from 2014 Japan Football League have to go through to qualify, and enter from the first round.

| 2014 J.League Division 1 all clubs | 2014 J.League Division 2 all clubs | 2013 Emperor's Cup best amateur club | 47 prefectural tournament winners | |
| Albirex Niigata; Kashima Antlers; Omiya Ardija; Cerezo Osaka; Yokohama F. Marinos; Kawasaki Frontale; Gamba Osaka; Nagoya Grampus; Urawa Red Diamonds; Kashiwa Reysol; Shimizu S-Pulse; Sagan Tosu; Sanfrecce Hiroshima; FC Tokyo; Vegalta Sendai; Ventforet Kofu; Vissel Kobe; Tokushima Vortis | Avispa Fukuoka; Shonan Bellmare; Consadole Sapporo; Ehime FC; Fagiano Okayama; FC Gifu; Giravanz Kitakyushu; Mito HollyHock; JEF United Chiba; Júbilo Iwata; Kamatamare Sanuki; Kataller Toyama; Montedio Yamagata; Roasso Kumamoto; Kyoto Sanga; Thespakusatsu Gunma; Tochigi SC; Oita Trinita; Tokyo Verdy; V-Varen Nagasaki; Matsumoto Yamaga; Yokohama FC | Nagano Parceiro | Hokkaido: Norbritz Hokkaido; Aomori: Vanraure Hachinohe; Iwate: Grulla Morioka; Miyagi: Sony Sendai; Akita: Blaublitz Akita; Yamagata: Montedio Yamagata U-18; Fukushima: Fukushima United; Ibaraki: University of Tsukuba; Tochigi: Tochigi Uva; Gunma: Tonan Maebashi Satellite; Saitama: Saitama SC; Chiba: Urayasu SC; Tokyo: Meiji University; Kanagawa: YSCC Yokohama; Yamanashi: Yamanashi Gakuin University High School; Nagano: FC Ueda Gentian; Niigata: Japan Soccer College; Toyama: Toyama Shinjo; Ishikawa: Zweigen Kanazawa; Fukui: Saurcos Fukui; Shizuoka: Fujieda MYFC; Aichi: Toyota Shūkyūdan; Mie: Veertien Kuwana; Gifu: Gifu Keizai University | Shiga: Biwako Seikei Sport College; Kyoto: Kyoto Sangyo University; Osaka: FC Osaka; Hyōgo: Kwansei Gakuin University; Nara: Nara Club; Wakayama: Arterivo Wakayama; Tottori: Gainare Tottori; Shimane: Dezzolla Shimane; Okayama: Fagiano Okayama Next; Hiroshima: SRC Hiroshima; Yamaguchi: Tokuyama University; Kagawa: Tadotsu FC; Tokushima: Tokushima Ichiritsu High School; Ehime: FC Imabari; Kōchi: Kōchi University; Fukuoka: Fukuoka University; Saga: Saga University; Nagasaki: Mitsubishi Nagasaki SC; Kumamoto: Kumamoto Teachers SC; Ōita: Verspah Oita; Miyazaki: Honda Lock; Kagoshima: Kagoshima United; Okinawa: FC Ryukyu |

== Results ==
=== First round ===
| 5 July 2014 No.1 | Fukuoka University | 2–1 | Kochi University | Hakata-ku, Fukuoka |
| 13:00 | Uryu 45'; Nakano 87' | Report | Arima 83' | Stadium: Level-5 Stadium; Attendance: 340; Referee: Takeshi Asada |

| 5 July 2014 No.2 | FC Osaka | 0–5 | Zweigen Kanazawa | Higashisumiyoshi-ku, Osaka |
| 15:00 | | Report | Omachi 12', 46', 71'; Kiyohara 77', 79' | Stadium: Kincho Stadium; Attendance: 619; Referee: Yasuhiro Uchida |

| 5 July 2014 No.3 | Tokushima Ichiritsu High School | 1–7 | Kagoshima United | Naruto, Tokushima |
| 13:00 | Kishida 84' | Report | Maeda 15', 55', 89'; Yanagisaki 35', 90+2'; Kuriyama 41'; Unknown 60' (o.g.) | Stadium: Pocarisweat Stadium; Attendance: 262; Referee: Atsushi Uemura |

| 6 July 2014 No.4 | Blaublitz Akita | 7–1 | Saitama FC | Akita |
| 13:00 | Maeyama 4'; Shinzato 39' (pen.); Leonardo 51', 82'; Miyoshi 55', 84', 90' | Report | Ono 65' | Stadium: Akita Municipal Yabase Athletic Park Football Stadium; Attendance: 681; Referee: Motoki Tawara |

| 5 July 2014 No.5 | Biwako Seikei Sport College | 7–0 | Gifu Keizai University | Higashiōmi, Shiga |
| 13:00 | Kumada 11', 30'; Kubo 40', 45', 80'; Miya 73'; Kato 88' | Report | | Stadium: Nunobiki Green Stadium; Attendance: 268; Referee: Yukitaka Kumagai |

| 26 July 2014 No.6 | Norbritz Hokkaido | 1–2 | Tonan Maebashi Satellite | Atsubetsu-ku, Sapporo |
| 13:00 | Yamada 67' | | 59' Sekine; 84' Hoshino | Stadium: Sapporo Atsubetsu Park Stadium; Attendance: 374; Referee: Shiotsu Yusuke |

| 5 July 2014 No.7 | Veertien Kuwana | 2–1 (a.e.t.) | Kyoto Sangyo University | Suzuka, Mie |
| 13:00 | Douglas 43'; Tamiya 102' | Report | Kitsui 89' | Stadium: Suzuka Sports Garden; Attendance: 603; Referee: Yoshikazu Matsuzawa |

| 5 July 2014 No.8 | Nara Club | 3–1 | Fukushima United | Kashihara, Nara |
| 13:00 | Tsurumi 5'; Seri 34'; Baba 69' | Report | Kuno 30' | Stadium: Nara Prefectural Kashihara Koen Athletics Stadium; Attendance: 649; Referee: Shu Kawamata |

| 5 July 2014 No.9 | Arterivo Wakayama | 2–4 (a.e.t.) | Fujieda MYFC | Wakayama |
| 13:00 | Onishi 31' (pen.); Nagai 71' | Report | Nishiyama 16'; Oishi 17', 101', 109' | Stadium: Kimiidera Athletic Stadium; Attendance: 783; Referee: Reo Tanaka |

| 5 July 2014 No.10 | University of Tsukuba | 1–2 | Sony Sendai | Hitachinaka, Ibaraki |
| 15:00 | Kurumaya 67' | Report | Koizumi 16'; Nakamura 61' | Stadium: Hitachinaka City Stadium; Attendance: 396; Referee: Kazuhiro Ikeda |

| 6 July 2014 No.11 | Saga University | 0–1 | Shunan University | Saga |
| 13:01 | | Report | Ogasawara 43' | Stadium: Saga Athletic Stadium; Attendance: 371; Referee: Takumi Shinoto |

| 6 July 2014 No.12 | Dezzolla Shimane | 0–5 | Verspah Oita | Matsue, Shimane |
| 14:00 | | Report | Fukumitsu 11', 58'; Tsubata 37'; Nakamura 44'; Nakashima 84' | Stadium: Matsue Athletic Stadium; Attendance: 647; Referee: Daisuke Sakurai |

| 6 July 2014 No.13 | Mitsubishi Nagasaki | 1–2 | Honda Lock | Isahaya, Nagasaki |
| 13:00 | Kumagai 90+1' | Report | Harada 59', 72' | Stadium: Nagasaki Athletic Stadium; Attendance: 428; Referee: Lee Sang Gi |

| 5 July 2014 No.14 | Yamanashi Gakuin University High School | 0–2 | Meiji University | Kōfu, Yamanashi |
| 13:00 | | Report | Yajima 41' (pen.); Izumi 54' | Stadium: Yamanashi Chuo Bank Stadium; Attendance: 410; Referee: Osamu Nomura |

| 5 July 2014 No.15 | Tochigi Uva | 1–2 | Kwansei Gakuin University | Tochigi, Tochigi |
| 13:00 | Nakagawa 71' | Report | Goya 7', 43' | Stadium: Tochigi Municipal Athletic Park Stadium; Attendance: 349; Referee: Kenya Ohara |

| 6 July 2014 No.16 | Toyama Shinjo | 0–7 | Saurcos Fukui | Toyama |
| 13:00 | | Report | Azechi 6', 28', 63'; Kondo 32', 45+2'; Akita 52'; Abe 90' | Stadium: Iwase Sports Park Soccer/Rugby Field; Attendance: 405; Referee: Yuichi Nishizuru |

| 6 July 2014 No.17 | FC Imabari | 1–2 | Fagiano Okayama Next | Matsuyama, Ehime |
| 13:00 | Inada 69' | Report | Kobayashi 23'; Iida 90' | Stadium: Ehime Prefectural Sports Park Football Field; Attendance: 259; Referee: Yunosuke Kanetsugu |

| 6 July 2014 No.18 | Nagano Parceiro | 2–0 | Japan Soccer College | Matsumoto, Nagano |
| 15:00 | Nishiguchi 28'; Unozawa 65' | Report | | Stadium: Alwin; Attendance: 1,476; Referee: Haruki Hidaka |

| 6 July 2014 No.19 | YSCC Yokohama | 3–1 | SRC Hiroshima | Yamato, Kanagawa |
| 13:00 | Yoshida 57'; Mita 63'; Iike 78' | Report | Ueda 77' | Stadium: Yamato Sports Center Stadium; Attendance: 681; Referee: Yohei Tsuno |

| 6 July 2014 No.20 | Vanraure Hachinohe | 1–0 | Montedio Yamagata U-18 | Towada, Aomori |
| 13:00 | Sugai 56' | Report | | Stadium: Aomori Prefectural Football Center at Towada Municipal Mt. Takamori Athletic Park; Attendance: 622; Referee: Masaki Tsuruoka |

| 6 July 2014 No.21 | Kumamoto Teachers | 0–2 | FC Ryukyu | Ōzu, Kumamoto |
| 13:00 | | Report | Fujisawa 59'; Tomidokoro 90' | Stadium: Ōzu Town Athletic Park Football Field; Attendance: 165; Referee: Yusuke Shiotsu |

| 6 July 2014 No.22 | Grulla Morioka | 0–1 | Urayasu SC | Morioka, Iwate |
| 13:00 | | Report | Shimizu 11' | Stadium: Morioka South Park Football Field; Attendance: 621; Referee: Hiroyuki Sumita |

| 6 July 2014 No.23 | Toyota Shukyudan | 4–1 | Ueda Gentian | Minato-ku, Nagoya |
| 14:00 | Koike 11'; Katayama 15'; Suzuki 35'; Hasuo 88' | Report | Fujita 49' | Stadium: Nagoya City Minato Soccer Stadium; Attendance: 405; Referee: Kenshi Uda |

| 6 July 2014 No.24 | Gainare Tottori | 6–0 | Tadotsu FC | Tottori |
| 13:00 | Mori 40'; Ando 41'; Hirota 51', 72', 90+1'; Nakayama 90+3' (pen.) | Report | | Stadium: Tottori Bank Bird Stadium; Attendance: 1,216; Referee: Kakuro Hori |

=== Second round ===
| 12 July 2014 No.25 | Sanfrecce Hiroshima | 5–2 | Fukuoka University | Fukuyama, Hiroshima |
| 16:00 | Notsuda 22', 90'; Shimizu 53'; Shiotani 64'; Minagawa 90+4' | Report | Yamasaki 14', 43' | Stadium: Fukuyama Takegahana Stadium; Attendance: 5,196; Referee: Kenji Ogiya |

| 13 July 2014 No.26 | Mito HollyHock | 2–0 | Avispa Fukuoka | Mito, Ibaraki |
| 16:00 | Suzuki 25'; Onoya 85' | Report | | Stadium: K's denki Stadium Mito; Attendance: 1,569; Referee: Hiromichi Oka |

| 12 July 2014 No.27 | Gamba Osaka | 5–1 | Zweigen Kanazawa | Suita, Osaka |
| 16:00 | Usami 11'; Kurata 19', 56', 81'; Nishino 38' | Report | Sato 22' | Stadium: Osaka Expo '70 Stadium; Attendance: 2,862; Referee: Yosuke Kubota |

| 12 July 2014 No.28 | Tokushima Vortis | 1–0 | Kagoshima United | Naruto, Tokushima |
| 13:00 | Douglas 88' | Report | | Stadium: Pocarisweat Stadium; Attendance: 1,208; Referee: Futoshi Nakamura |

| 12 July 2014 No.29 | FC Tokyo | 8–0 | Blaublitz Akita | Chofu, Tokyo |
| 18:00 | Mita 11'; Kawano 22'; Morishige 26'; Edú 29' (pen.), 58'; Ota 48'; Hirayama 62'; Watanabe 84' | Report | | Stadium: Ajinomoto Stadium; Attendance: 5,860; Referee: Nobutsugu Murakami |

| 12 July 2014 No.30 | Matsumoto Yamaga | 1–0 | Kamatamare Sanuki | Matsumoto, Nagano |
| 15:00 | Shiina 86' | Report | | Stadium: Matsumotodaira Football Stadium; Attendance: 5,767; Referee: Koji Morikawa |

| 12 July 2014 No.31 | Shimizu S-Pulse | 5–0 | Biwako Seikei Sport College | Shimizu-ku, Shizuoka |
| 18:00 | Sugiyama 58'; Omae 81'; Novakovič 83' (pen.); T. Takagi 88'; Y. Takagi 90+2' | Report | | Stadium: IAI Stadium Nihondaira; Attendance: 2,844; Referee: Ryuji Sato |

| 6 August 2014 No.32 | Consadole Sapporo | 5–0 | Tonan Maebashi Satellite | Atsubetsu-ku, Sapporo |
| 19:00 | Maeda 3'; Kudo 38'; Jeong Shung-hoon 66', 68'; Sonoda 83' | | | Stadium: Sapporo Atsubetsu Park Stadium; Attendance: 1,654; Referee: Noda Yuki |

| 12 July 2014 No.33 | Cerezo Osaka | 4–2 (a.e.t.) | Veertien Kuwana | Higashisumiyoshi-ku, Osaka |
| 19:00 | Sugimoto 33'; Minamino 76'; Sakemoto 97', 117' | Report | Kota Araki 5'; Jibrin 65' | Stadium: Kincho Stadium; Attendance: 6,323; Referee: Takuto Okabe |

| 13 July 2014 No.34 | Yokohama FC | 0–1 | Kataller Toyama | Kanagawa-ku, Yokohama |
| 18:00 | | Report | Uchida 22' | Stadium: Nippatsu Mitsuzawa Stadium; Attendance: 1,326; Referee: Itaru Hirose |

| 12 July 2014 No.35 | Vegalta Sendai | 1–2 | Nara Club | Izumi-ku, Sendai |
| 13:00 | Yanagisawa 33' | Report | Ono 75'; Okayama 86' | Stadium: Yurtec Stadium Sendai; Attendance: 3,672; Referee: Hajime Matsuo |

| 12 July 2014 No.36 | Júbilo Iwata | 2–0 | Fujieda MYFC | Iwata, Shizuoka |
| 18:00 | Kanazono 61' (pen.), 90' | Report | | Stadium: Yamaha Stadium; Attendance: 3,577; Referee: Haruki Hidaka |

| 12 July 2014 No.37 | Kashima Antlers | 2–2 (a.e.t.) (1–2 p) | Sony Sendai | Kashima, Ibaraki |
| 18:00 | Davi 33'; Caio 36' | Report | Hosomi 23'; Tanaka 28' | Stadium: Kashima Soccer Stadium; Attendance: 3,656; Referee: Hiroyuki Kimura |
| | Penalties |
| | Ogasawara (penalty scored); Nozawa (penalty missed); Shibasaki (penalty missed); Nakamura (penalty missed); Yamamoto (penalty missed) | | (penalty missed) Seta; (penalty missed) Miyao; (penalty scored) Nakamura; (penalty scored) Sawaguchi |

| 13 July 2014 No.38 | Roasso Kumamoto | 0–1 | Montedio Yamagata | Higashi-ku, Kumamoto |
| 18:00 | | Report | Yamazaki 87' | Stadium: Umakana Yokana Stadium; Attendance: 2,018; Referee: Yuki Noda |

| 13 July 2014 No.39 | Sagan Tosu | 4–1 | Shunan University | Tosu, Saga |
| 13:00 | Toyoda 7', 41'; Ikeda 16'; Takahashi 85' | Report | Ueno 79' | Stadium: Best Amenity Stadium; Attendance: 3,002; Referee: Toshimitsu Yoshida |

| 13 July 2014 No.40 | Oita Trinita | 2–1 | Verspah Oita | Ōita |
| 16:00 | Takamatsu 31'; Sakai 34' (pen.) | Report | Hamanaka 42' | Stadium: Ōita Bank Dome; Attendance: 2,545; Referee: Takumi Shinoto |

| 12 July 2014 No.41 | Yokohama F. Marinos | 3–0 | Honda Lock | Kanagawa-ku, Yokohama |
| 18:00 | Hyodo 45+1'; Hanato 50'; Amano 85' | Report | | Stadium: Nippatsu Mitsuzawa Stadium; Attendance: 5,821; Referee: Akihiko Ikeuchi |

| 13 July 2014 No.42 | Tokyo Verdy | 1–2 | Giravanz Kitakyushu | Kita-ku, Tokyo |
| 18:00 | Ibayashi 80' | Report | Hara 42', 83' | Stadium: Ajinomoto Field Nishigaoka; Attendance: 1,387; Referee: Yudai Yamamoto |

| 12 July 2014 No.43 | Ventforet Kofu | 1–0 | Meiji University | Kōfu, Yamanashi |
| 15:00 | Mizuno 52' | Report | | Stadium: Yamanashi Chuo Bank Stadium; Attendance: 2,105; Referee: Masuya Ueda |

| 12 July 2014 No.44 | Vissel Kobe | 1–2 | Kwansei Gakuin University | Miki, Hyōgo |
| 16:00 | Morioka 90+4' | Report | Ikeda 65'; Mori 83' | Stadium: Miki Sogo Bosai Park Athletic Stadium; Attendance: 2,870; Referee: Tetsuro Yoshida |

| 13 July 2014 No.45 | Albirex Niigata | 8–1 | Saurcos Fukui | Sakai, Fukui |
| 16:00 | Suzuki 23', 32', 50'; Okamoto 28', 38'; Naruoka 67'; Tanaka 81', 90+3' | Report | Iwasaki 61' | Stadium: Technoport Fukui Stadium; Attendance: 2,130; Referee: Hiroyoshi Takayama |

| 12 July 2014 No.46 | V-Varen Nagasaki | 3–1 | FC Gifu | Isahaya, Nagasaki |
| 18:00 | Kōichi Satō 15'; Azuma 48'; Okuno 52' | Report | Sekita 88' | Stadium: Nagasaki Athletic Stadium; Attendance: 2,574; Referee: Eiji Kawai |

| 12 July 2014 No.47 | Kashiwa Reysol | 4–0 | Fagiano Okayama Next | Kashiwa, Chiba |
| 16:00 | Hashimoto 30'; Leandro 44'; Otani 79'; Oshima 90+3' | Report | | Stadium: Hitachi Kashiwa Soccer Stadium; Attendance: 3,003; Referee: Junpei Iida |

| 13 July 2014 No.48 | JEF United Chiba | 3–2 | Nagano Parceiro | Chuo-ku, Chiba |
| 16:00 | Takayuki Morimoto 10', 69'; Kempes 51' | Report | Sato 11'; Unozawa 39' | Stadium: Fukuda Denshi Arena; Attendance: 3,874; Referee: Shoichiro Mikami |

| 12 July 2014 No.49 | Kawasaki Frontale | 2–1 (a.e.t.) | YSCC Yokohama | Nakahara-ku, Kawasaki |
| 19:00 | Komiyama 90+1'; Morishima 117' | Report | Matsuda 54' | Stadium: Todoroki Athletics Stadium; Attendance: 5,490; Referee: Koichiro Fukushima |

| 13 July 2014 No.50 | Fagiano Okayama | 1–2 | Ehime FC | Fukuyama, Hiroshima |
| 16:00 | Hayashi 49' | Report | Horigome 21'; Kawahara 81' | Stadium: Fukuyama Takegahana Stadium; Attendance: 1,524; Referee: Taku Nagaya |

| 12 July 2014 No.51 | Omiya Ardija | 3–1 | Vanraure Hachinohe | Ōmiya-ku, Saitama |
| 18:00 | Kikuchi 38'; Hasegawa 50', 55' | Report | Sudo 5' | Stadium: Nack5 Stadium Omiya; Attendance: 2,434; Referee: Kazuyoshi Enomoto |

| 13 July 2014 No.52 | Shonan Bellmare | 2–1 (a.e.t.) | FC Ryukyu | Hiratsuka, Kanagawa |
| 16:00 | Kikuchi 52'; Maruyama 102' (pen.) | Report | Urashima 35' | Stadium: Shonan BMW Stadium Hiratsuka; Attendance: 1,958; Referee: Tomohiro Tsukada |

| 12 July 2014 No.53 | Urawa Red Diamonds | 8–2 | Urayasu SC | Urawa-ku, Saitama |
| 18:00 | Abe 11'; Koroki 41', 77'; Ugajin 45+1'; Umesaki 52'; Moriwaki 58'; Suzuki 83'; Sekine 90+1' | Report | Uematsu 37'; Shimizu 90+3' | Stadium: Urawa Komaba Stadium; Attendance: 7,275; Referee: Masaaki Iemoto |

| 12 July 2014 No.54 | Tochigi SC | 0–0 (a.e.t.) (0–3 p) | Thespakusatsu Gunma | Utsunomiya, Tochigi |
| 18:00 | | Report | | Stadium: Tochigi Green Stadium; Attendance: 2,049; Referee: Kenta Tsukada |
| | Penalties |
| | Okubo (penalty missed); Cha Young-hwan (penalty missed); Shigematsu (penalty missed) | | (penalty scored) Miyazaki; (penalty scored) Segawa; (penalty scored) Kobayashi |

| 12 July 2014 No.55 | Nagoya Grampus | 12–0 | Toyota Shukyudan | Mizuho-ku, Nagoya |
| 15:00 | Nagai 17', 21', 22', 42', 67'; Tulio 31'; Sato 45', 77'; Matsuda 68', 90+1'; Yada 71'; Tanabe 90+4' | Report | | Stadium: Mizuho Athletic Stadium; Attendance: 2,911; Referee: Yoshiro Imamura |

| 13 July 2014 No.56 | Kyoto Sanga | 3–1 | Gainare Tottori | Tottori |
| 13:00 | Oguro 2'; Nakayama 67'; Yamase 85' | Report | Mawatari 38' | Stadium: Tottori Bank Bird Stadium; Attendance: 2,098; Referee: Koei Koya |

=== Third round ===
| 27 August 2014 No.57 | Sanfrecce Hiroshima | 1–0 | Mito HollyHock | Asaminami-ku, Hiroshima |
| 19:00 | Sato 26' | | | Stadium: EDION Stadium Hiroshima |

| 20 August 2014 No.58 | Gamba Osaka | 1–0 | Tokushima Vortis | Suita, Osaka |
| 19:00 | | | | Stadium: Osaka Expo '70 Stadium |

| 20 August 2014 No.59 | FC Tokyo | 2–0 | Matsumoto Yamaga | Chofu, Tokyo |
| 19:00 | Kawano 41'; Hirayama 54' | | | Stadium: Ajinomoto Stadium; Attendance: 9,446; Referee: Yuichi Nishimura |

| 20 August 2014 No.60 | Shimizu S-Pulse | 2–1 | Consadole Sapporo | Shimizu-ku, Shizuoka |
| 19:00 | | | | Stadium: IAI Stadium Nihondaira |

| 20 August 2014 No.61 | Cerezo Osaka | 1–0 | Kataller Toyama | Higashisumiyoshi-ku, Osaka |
| 19:00 | | | | Stadium: Kincho Stadium |

| 20 August 2014 No.62 | Júbilo Iwata | 5–0 | Nara Club | Iwata, Shizuoka |
| 19:00 | | | | Stadium: Yamaha Stadium |

| 20 August 2014 No.63 | Sony Sendai | 0–1 | Montedio Yamagata | Izumi-ku, Sendai |
| 19:00 | | | | Stadium: Yurtec Stadium Sendai |

| 20 August 2014 No.64 | Sagan Tosu | 3–1 | Oita Trinita | Tosu, Saga |
| 19:00 | | | | Stadium: Best Amenity Stadium |

| 20 August 2014 No.65 | Yokohama F. Marinos | 2–3 (a.e.t.) | Giravanz Kitakyushu | Kanagawa-ku, Yokohama |
| 19:00 | | | | Stadium: Nippatsu Mitsuzawa Stadium |

| 20 August 2014 No.66 | Ventforet Kofu | 2–1 | Kwansei Gakuin University | Kōfu, Yamanashi |
| 19:00 | | | | Stadium: Yamanashi Chuo Bank Stadium |

| 20 August 2014 No.67 | Albirex Niigata | 1–2 (a.e.t.) | V-Varen Nagasaki | Chuo-ku, Niigata |
| 19:00 | | | | Stadium: Denka Big Swan Stadium |

| 20 August 2014 No.68 | Kashiwa Reysol | 1–1 (a.e.t.) (11–12 p) | JEF United Chiba | Kashiwa, Chiba |
| 19:00 | | | | Stadium: Hitachi Kashiwa Soccer Stadium |

| 20 August 2014 No.69 | Kawasaki Frontale | 0–1 | Ehime FC | Nakahara-ku, Kawasaki |
| 19:00 | | | | Stadium: Todoroki Athletics Stadium |

| 20 August 2014 No.70 | Omiya Ardija | 2–1 | Shonan Bellmare | Ōmiya-ku, Saitama |
| 19:00 | | | | Stadium: Nack5 Stadium Omiya |

| 20 August 2014 No.71 | Urawa Red Diamonds | 1–2 | Thespakusatsu Gunma | Urawa-ku, Saitama |
| 19:00 | Lee 39' (pen.) | | 69' Aoki; 81' Daniel Lovinho | Stadium: Urawa Komaba Stadium; Attendance: 6,254; Referee: Hiroyuki Kimura |

| 20 August 2014 No.72 | Nagoya Grampus | 4–0 | Kyoto Sanga | Mizuho-ku, Nagoya |
| 19:00 | Matsuda 8'; Tulio 43'; Tamada 53', 67' | Report | | Stadium: Mizuho Athletic Stadium; Attendance: 2,892 |

=== Fourth round ===
| 10 September 2014 No.73 | Sanfrecce Hiroshima | 1–3 | Gamba Osaka | Hiroshima |
| | | | | Stadium: Hiroshima Big Arch |

| 7 September 2014 No.74 | FC Tokyo | 1–2 | Shimizu S-Pulse | Tokyo |
| | | | | Stadium: Ajinomoto Stadium |

| 10 September 2014 No.75 | Cerezo Osaka | 2–0 | Júbilo Iwata | Osaka |
| | | | | Stadium: Nagai Stadium |

| 10 September 2014 No.76 | Montedio Yamagata | 1–0 (a.e.t.) | Sagan Tosu | Tosu, Saga |
| | | | | Stadium: Best Amenity Stadium |

| 10 September 2014 No.77 | Giravanz Kitakyushu | 0–0 (a.e.t.) (4–3 p) | Ventforet Kofu | Kofu, Yamanashi |
| | | | | Stadium: Yamanashi Chuo Bank Stadium |

| 10 September 2014 No.78 | V-Varen Nagasaki | 1–2 (a.e.t.) | JEF United Chiba | Chiba, Chiba |
| | | | | Stadium: Fukuda Denshi Arena |

| 10 September 2014 No.79 | Ehime FC | 1–2 | Omiya Ardija | Saitama, Saitama |
| | | | | Stadium: NACK5 Stadium Omiya |

| 10 September 2014 No.80 | Thespakusatsu Gunma | 0–1 | Nagoya Grampus | Nagoya, Aichi |
| 19:04 | | Report | Leandro Domingues 75' | Stadium: Mizuho Athletic Stadium; Attendance: 2,810 |

=== Quarter-finals ===
| 15 October 2014 No.81 | Gamba Osaka | 2–0 | Omiya Ardija | Osaka |
| 19:00 | | | | Stadium: Osaka Expo '70 Stadium |

| 11 October 2014 No.82 | Nagoya Grampus | 2–2 (a.e.t.) (3–5 p) | Shimizu S-Pulse | Nagoya, Aichi |
| 19:04 | Yoshizumi Ogawa 72'; Kensuke Nagai 82' | "Report" (PDF). | Yoshiaki Takagi 65'; Toshiyuki Takagi 67' | Stadium: Mizuho Athletic Stadium; Attendance: 6,113; Referee: Hiroyuki Kimura |
| | Penalties |
| | Marcus Tulio Tanaka (penalty scored); Ryota Isomura (penalty scored); Naoshi Nakamura (penalty scored); Asahi Yada (penalty missed) | | (penalty scored) Genki Omae; (penalty scored) Toshiyuki Takagi; (penalty scored) Takuya Honda; (penalty scored) Mitsunari Musaka; (penalty scored) Yasuhiro Hiraoka |

| 15 October 2014 No.83 | Cerezo Osaka | 0–1 | JEF United Chiba | Osaka |
| 19:00 | | | | Stadium: Kincho Stadium |

| 15 October 2014 No.84 | Montedio Yamagata | 1–0 | Giravanz Kitakyushu | Tendō, Yamagata |
| 19:00 | | | | Stadium: ND Soft Stadium Yamagata |

=== Semi-finals ===
| 26 November 2014 No.85 | Gamba Osaka | 5–2 | Shimizu S-Pulse | Tokyo |
| 19:00 | | | | Stadium: Ajinomoto Stadium |

| 26 November 2014 No.86 | JEF United Chiba | 2–3 | Montedio Yamagata | Osaka |
| 19:00 | | | | Stadium: Nagai Stadium |

=== Final ===
This was the sixth final in the history of the Emperor's Cup involving at least one club from the second division.

| 13 December 2014 No.87 | Gamba Osaka | 3–1 | Montedio Yamagata | Yokohama, Kanagawa |
| 14:04 | Usami 4', 85'; Patric 22' | | 62' Romero Frank | Stadium: International Stadium Yokohama; Attendance: 47,829; Referee: Ryuji Sato |
