= BTOP Hokkaido =

Japanese football club

BTOP Hokkaido BTOP北海道
- Full name: BTOP Hokkaido
- Founded: 1998; 28 years ago as Sapporo Thank SC
- Ground: Iwamizawa City Okayama Sports Field; Iwamizawa, Hokkaido
- Owner(s): BTOP Co., Ltd.
- Chairman: Tetsuya Yano
- Manager: Masayuki Miura
- League: Hokkaido Soccer League
- 2025: 1st of 8 (Champions)
- Website: btop.jp

BTOP Hokkaido (BTOP北海道, Bi Ti O Pi Hokkaidō), formerly known as BTOP Thank Kuriyama, are a Japanese football club based in Kuriyama, Sorachi, Hokkaido. They play in the Hokkaido Soccer League. Despite playing in a league that holds an amateur status, the club's players and employees are currently signed on professional contracts.

== History ==
The club was established in 1998 under the name Sapporo Thank FC. As a phoenix club, it emerged from the dissolution of another Hokkaido team, Anfini Sapporo. Originally based in Sapporo, the club relocated to Kuriyama, a town in Hokkaido, in 2004. Following the move, the club rebranded as Thank FC Kuriyama. They competed in the Hokkaido Soccer League until 2006 but were relegated after finishing in seventh place in the league.

From 2007 to 2021, they played at the Hokkaido Block Leagues, which can be considered Japan's 7th-tier league. At the start of the 2021 year, the club once again rebranded, now changing into BTOP Thank Kuriyama. Former J.League player Tetsuya Yano became the club's president, and the players were all signed into professional contracts.

In 2022, they debuted in the 5th-tier league, Hokkaido Soccer League. After signing experienced players to help the team, BTOP Thank Kuriyama immediately won the Hokkaido Soccer League title after being promoted, after a last effort was made on 25 September, beating Sapporo FC by 8–0. With this win, their got their first promotion opportunity to the Japan Football League, Japan's 4th tier, via the 2022 Regional Champions League. They had qualified for the tournament by winning the Hokkaido League and by finishing as 2022 Shakaijin Cup runners-up, where they lost to Briobecca Urayasu by 5–3 after a penalty shoot-out, after a 0–0 tie in the regulation time. Despite their efforts, they were eliminated in the group stage of the competition, losing all three matches by 2–1.

The club aspires to be the second team from Hokkaido to ever join the J.League in any of its current divisions, after Hokkaido Consadole Sapporo on 1998. The path to join the J1 League is much more difficult from before, as newly founded teams have to climb from five or more leagues, to finally earn promotion for the J1 League. BTOP Thank Kuriyama, however, in high hopes, highlights their ambition to join the Japanese maximum level of professional football in back-to-back promotions by 2027.

On 13 March 2023, the club made an official announcement regarding a new name change, becoming BTOP Hokkaido. The club explained that the motivation for this change was "...to convey the charm of Hokkaido, which is full of dreams and vitality, through sports. (BTOP) will strive to grow into a team that is loved by everyone by involving the whole of Hokkaido by contributing to a wider range of areas through the team's activities."

== Current squad ==
As of 19 October 2023.

Note: Flags indicate national team as defined under FIFA eligibility rules; some limited exceptions apply. Players may hold more than one non-FIFA nationality.

| No. | Pos. | Nation | Player |
|---|---|---|---|
| 1 | GK | JPN | Ryosuke Hatakeyama |
| 2 | DF | JPN | Kohei Ueda |
| 3 | DF | JPN | Asahi Ishiwata |
| 4 | DF | JPN | Hayata Fukuyama |
| 5 | DF | JPN | Mun Hyong-jong |
| 6 | DF | JPN | Ryo Chikamochi |
| 7 | MF | JPN | Toshiya Motozuka |
| 8 | MF | JPN | Takuya Iwade |
| 10 | MF | JPN | Kota Sawada |
| 11 | MF | JPN | Masaru Ushihara |
| 13 | FW | JPN | Shoto Unno |
| 14 | FW | JPN | Toyoki Yoshiyuki |
| 15 | MF | JPN | Takuya Osawa |

| No. | Pos. | Nation | Player |
|---|---|---|---|
| 16 | MF | JPN | Masaya Hyodo |
| 17 | FW | JPN | Ryoka Abe |
| 18 | FW | JPN | Yuso Takamichi |
| 21 | FW | JPN | Kanta Sakata |
| 25 | MF | JPN | Takashi Yamauchi |
| 30 | GK | JPN | Shun Sato |
| 31 | GK | IDN | Ryu Nugraha (on loan from AC Nagano Parceiro) |
| 41 | MF | JPN | Daisei Ono |
| 43 | DF | JPN | Taiyo Hama |
| 45 | MF | JPN | Keishin Nakao |
| 55 | DF | JPN | Kenta Ito |
| 99 | MF | JPN | Shohei Kawakami |

== Coaching staff ==
| Position | Name |
|---|---|
| Manager | (Japan) Masayuki Miura |

== Club record ==
| Champions | Runners-up | Third place | Promoted | Relegated |

| Season | League | Position | P | W | D | L | F | A | GD | Pts | Emperor's Cup | Shakaijin Cup | RCL |
|---|---|---|---|---|---|---|---|---|---|---|---|---|---|
Sanku FC Kuriyama
| 2004–2021 | Hokkaido Block Leagues | – | | | | | | | | | | | |
BTOP Sanku Kuriyama
| 2022 | Hokkaido Soccer League | 1st | 14 | 11 | 3 | 0 | 60 | 3 | 57 | 36 | Did not qualify | Runners-up | Group stage |
BTOP Hokkaido
| 2023 | Hokkaido Soccer League | 1st | 14 | 13 | 0 | 1 | 100 | 13 | 87 | 39 | 2nd round Hokkaido Soccer League | Round of 32 | Group stage |
| 2024 | Hokkaido Soccer League | 2nd | 14 | 9 | 3 | 2 | 78 | 16 | 62 | 30 | Did not qualify | Round of 32 | Did not qualify |
| 2025 | Hokkaido Soccer League | 1st | 14 | 12 | 0 | 2 | 55 | 14 | 41 | 36 | 1st round | TBD | Group stage |
| 2026 | Hokkaido Soccer League | 3rd | 14 | 8 | 0 | 6 | 42 | 19 | 23 | 24 | TBD | TBD | Did not qualify |
| 2027 | Hokkaido Soccer League | TBD | 14 | | | | | | | | TBD | TBD | Did not qualify |

Key

- Pos. = Position in league; P = Games played; W = Games won; D = Games drawn; L = Games lost; F = Goals scored; A = Goals conceded; GD = Goals difference; Pts = Points gained

=== Shakaijin Cup record ===
| Season | Stage | Score | Opponent | Team scorer |
|---|---|---|---|---|
| 2022 | Round of 32 | 1–1 (a.e.t.) (11–10 p) | Mitsubishi Mizushima | Edamoto |
| 2022 | Round of 16 | 3–0 | Cobaltore Onagawa | Kammera, Hiraoka and Edamoto |
| 2022 | Quarter-finals | 1–1 (a.e.t.) (5–3 p) | Arterivo Wakayama | Motozuka |
| 2022 | Semi-finals | 2–2 (a.e.t.) (5–4 p) | Nobeoka Agata | Kammera and Kisa |
| 2022 | Final | 0–0 (a.e.t.) (3–5 p) | Briobecca Urayasu | – |
| 2023 | Round of 32 | 2–3 | FC Basara Hyogo | Unno |
| 2024 | Round of 32 | 0–3 | Tokyo United | |
| 2025 | | | | |
| 2026 | | | | |

=== Regional Champions League record ===
| Season | Stage | Score | Opponent | Team scorer |
|---|---|---|---|---|
| 2022 | Group stage | 1–2 | Nobeoka Agata | Kammera |
| 2022 | Group stage | 1–2 | FC Kariya | Kisa |
| 2022 | Group stage | 1–2 | Tochigi City | Kammera |
| 2023 | Group stage | 2–3 | Joyful Honda Tsukuba | Motozuka and Abe |
| 2023 | Group stage | 1–2 | Fukui United | Mun Hyong-jong |
| 2023 | Group stage | 4–1 | Arterivo Wakayama | Yoshiyuki, Abe, Fujiyoshi and Sawada |
| 2025 | Group stage | 0–1 | J-Lease FC | |
| 2025 | Group stage | 0–4 | FC Tokushima | |
| 2025 | Group stage | 0–5 | VONDS Ichihara | |

== Honours ==
BTOP Hokkaido honours
| Honour | No. | Years |
|---|---|---|
| Hokkaido Division 2 | 2 | 2001 |
| North Hokkaido Block League | 2 | 2008, 2009 |
| Central Hokkaido Block League | 3 | 2015, 2016, 2018 |
| Central/North Hokkaido Block League | 1 | 2021 |
| Hokkaido Soccer League | 3 | 2022, 2023, 2025 |
