= Ryuichi Ichiki =

Japanese footballer (born 1998)

Ryuichi Ichiki 一木 立一
Personal information
- Date of birth: 24 November 1998 (age 27)
- Place of birth: Kiryū, Gunma, Japan
- Height: 1.85 m (6 ft 1 in)
- Position: Forward

Team information
- Current team: Vonds Ichihara
- Number: 11

Youth career
- Shin-Kiryu FC
- Sakuragi Junior HS
- Ota HS
- –2020: Tokyo Gakugei University

Senior career*
Years	Team	Apps	(Gls)
2021–2022	Thespakusatsu Gunma	1	(0)
2021	→ FC Kariya (loan)	15	(3)
2022	→ Okinawa SV (loan)	18	(22)
2023	Okinawa SV	20	(2)
2024–	Vonds Ichihara	18	(9)
- * Club domestic league appearances and goals as of 6 October 2024, 14:00 (UTC)

Ryuichi Ichiki (一木 立一, Ichiki Ryuichi; born 24 November 1998) is a Japanese footballer who playing as a forward and currently play for Vonds Ichihara.

== Career ==
Ichiki, in his youth career, played at Shin-Kiryu FC, Sakuragi Junior High School FC, Ota High School FC, and at Tokyo Gakugei University FC. He graduated from university in 2020.

On 26 December 2020, Ichiki was announced as one of the new Thespakusatsu Gunma signings for the 2021 season.

On 28 March 2021, he made his professional club debut, participating in a match against Giravanz Kitakyushu in Matchweek 5, being subbed in the second half. On 31 July of the same year, Ichiki was loaned out to JFL club FC Kariya. He left from the club at the end of the 2021 season, after participating in FC Kariya's loss against Criacao Shinjuku on the Champions League, which led Kariya to be relegated to the Regional Leagues.

On 8 January 2022, Ichiki was loaned again by Gunma, now to KSL team Okinawa SV. He was influential in the 2022 Okinawa SV season, scoring 22 goals in 18 matches in the KSL, and four goals in six matches in the Regional Champions League. In the last match of this competition, Ichiki played his final match of his loan tenure against FC Kariya, his former club. He scored a goal in the 42nd minute, securing a 4–0 win. As a result, he helped to bring his club promotion to the JFL, which will be Okinawa's debut in the league, qualifying for it after finishing as Regional Champions League runners-up, behind champions Briobecca Urayasu. On 21 December of the same year, Ichiki was permanently transferred from Thespakusatsu Gunma to Okinawa SV for the upcoming 2023 season.

On 12 January 2024, Ichiki announcement officially transfer to Vonds Ichihara for ahead of 2024 season.

== Career statistics ==
=== Club ===
As of the start for 2025 season.

Club	Season	League			National Cup		League Cup		Other		Total	
Club	Season	Division	Apps	Goals	Apps	Goals	Apps	Goals	Apps	Goals	Apps	Goals
Thespakusatsu Gunma	2021	J2 League	1	0	—						1	0
Thespakusatsu Gunma	Total		1	0	—						1	0
FC Kariya (loan)	2021	JFL	15	3	—						15	3
FC Kariya (loan)	Total		15	3	—						15	3
Okinawa SV (loan)	2022	Kyushu	18	22	2	0	—				20	22
Okinawa SV	2023	JFL	20	2	0	0	—				20	2
Okinawa SV	Total		38	24	2	0	—				40	24
Vonds Ichihara	2024	Kanto Div 1	18	9	0	0	—				18	9
Vonds Ichihara	2025	Kanto Div 1	0	0	0	0	—				0	0
Vonds Ichihara	Total		18	9	0	0	—				18	9
Career total			72	36	2	0	0	0	0	0	74	36

== Honours ==
- Okinawa SV
  - Kyushu Soccer League Champions: 2022
- Vonds Ichihara
  - Kantō Soccer League Champions: 2024
- Individual
  - Kyushu Soccer League Top-scorer: 2022
