= 2022 Japanese Regional Football Champions League =

Japanese amateur leagues football season

2022 Japanese Regional Champions League
Tournament details
- Country: Japan
- Dates: 11–27 November 2022
- Teams: 12

Final positions
- Champions: Briobecca Urayasu (1st title)
- Runners-up: Okinawa SV

Tournament statistics
- Matches played: 24
- Goals scored: 63 (2.63 per match)
- Attendance: 8,452 (352 per match)
- Top goal scorer(s): Yuta Yamada (5 goals)

The 2022 Japanese Regional Football Champions League (全国地域サッカーチャンピオンズリーグ2022) was the 46th edition of the referred annually contested cup for the best-placed teams of each of their respective Regional Leagues, and of the 2022 Shakaijin Cup. Criacao Shinjuku was the title holder, as winners of the 2021 edition of the tournament. Promoted to the JFL, the club couldn't defend their title. Briobecca Urayasu won the championship at the final round, being promoted to the Japan Football League years after relegated from it on 2017. Finishing as runners-up, Okinawa SV was also promoted to Japan's 4th division for the first time in their history.

== Format ==
As usual, 12 teams participated in the transitional tournament for regional league teams who want to join the JFL. The 2019 format was restored, with three Shakaijin Cup teams that were not yet qualified to the Champions League via the Regional Leagues (being placed below the champions of their league), alongside the nine champions of the 2022 Japanese Regional Leagues.

It featured two stages: The first stage had the 12 teams split into 3 groups with 4 teams in each, with each group winners and the overall best runners-up being qualified to the second stage. This second, and final stage, had the 4 teams playing (again) in a round-robin format, with the winners and runners-up of the competition staying a foot apart from qualifying to the 2023 Japan Football League, pending the league's approval. Only teams that want to join the JFL can be promoted. Unlike the previous year, where 11 of the 12 teams submitted applications to the JFL (as Mitsubishi Mizushima didn't expressed a desire to join the league), all the participating teams on this edition submitted documents indicating their intention to join the JFL. The order of priority to join the JFL goes from the first-placed team to the last-placed team in the competition, so, the two best teams amongst those whom the JFL have approved membership can be promoted. A meeting between the JFL Board of Directors, scheduled to be held on 6 December 2022, determines whether the winners and runners-up of the competition will have its membership accepted. Its results will be published on the same day at 13:00 (JST).

Depending on the clubs that ended up as the top 3 teams in the Shakaijin Cup, a specific rank that would take the J.League 100 Year Plan club status clubs and its performances in the 2022 Regional Leagues into account would be applied to determine the final teams on this competition. However, the rank was not necessary, as out of the four semi-finalists, only BTOP Thank Kuriyama was already in the competition, as the Hokkaido League champions. The other three semi-finalists had not yet qualified to the Champions League via their Regional Leagues, then, they filled the remaining three slots left, pre-allocated to the top-placed teams of the Shakaijin Cup.

== Participating teams ==
Locations of clubs participating in the 2022 National Regional Football Champions League

Returning teams from the previous season were noted in bold. Teams relegated from the previous JFL season were noted in italics.

Region	Slots	Team	Rank
Hokkaido	1	BTOP Thank Kuriyama	1st (League)
Tohoku	1	**Cobaltore Onagawa**	1st (League)
Kantō	2	Tochigi City; Briobecca Urayasu	1st (League); 1st (Cup)
Hokushin'etsu	1	**Artista Asama**	1st (League)
Tōkai	1	FC Kariya	1st (League)
Kansai	1	Arterivo Wakayama	1st (League)
Chugoku	1	Fukuyama City	1st (League)
Shikoku	1	**FC Tokushima**	1st (League)
Kyushu	3	**Okinawa SV**; Nobeoka Agata; Veroskronos Tsuno	1st (League); 3rd (Cup); 4th (Cup)

== First round ==
Each group had its matches played in a round-robin format. Each team played three matches in just three days, from 11 to 13 November, with one being played at each day. The draw was conducted on 22 October 2022, streamed live by Kansai Soccer League's official YouTube channel.

=== Group A ===
Pos	Team	Pld	W	D	L	GF	GA	GD	Pts	Qualification
1	FC Kariya	3	2	1	0	7	4	+3	7	Advance to the final round
2	Tochigi City	3	2	1	0	5	2	+3	7	Advance to the final round
3	Nobeoka Agata	3	1	0	2	4	7	−3	3	
4	BTOP Thank Kuriyama	3	0	0	3	3	6	−3	0	

Source: JFFMS

11 November 2022	Tochigi City	1–1	FC Kariya	Maebashi, Gunma
10:45	Ando 87'	Report (JFA)	Nomura 43'	Stadium: Earth Care Gunma Shikishima Football Stadium; Attendance: 350; Referee: Masakazu Kato

11 November 2022	Nobeoka Agata	2–1	BTOP Thank Kuriyama	Maebashi, Gunma
13:30	Ijuin 37', 47'	Report (JFA)	Kammera 80'	Stadium: Earth Care Gunma Shikishima Football Stadium; Attendance: 163; Referee: Masamitsu Hashimoto

12 November 2022	Tochigi City	2–0	Nobeoka Agata	Maebashi, Gunma
10:45	Caletti 59'; Omotehara 66'	Report (JFA)		Stadium: Earth Care Gunma Shikishima Football Stadium; Attendance: 284; Referee: Ken Tsukahara

12 November 2022	FC Kariya	2–1	BTOP Thank Kuriyama	Maebashi, Gunma
13:30	Suzuki 75'; Fujiwara 90+5'	Report (JFA)	Kisa 35'	Stadium: Earth Care Gunma Shikishima Football Stadium; Attendance: 290; Referee: Kazuki Nakamura

13 November 2022	Tochigi City	2–1	BTOP Thank Kuriyama	Maebashi, Gunma
10:45	Shimizu 56'; Caletti 66'	Report (JFA)	Kammera 63'	Stadium: Earth Care Gunma Shikishima Football Stadium; Attendance: 328; Referee: Ken Tsukahara

13 November 2022	FC Kariya	4–2	Nobeoka Agata	Maebashi, Gunma
13:30	Sasaki 6' (pen.); Kawanishi 7'; Suzuki 17'; Nomura 21'	Report (JFA)	Ijuin 59', 67'	Stadium: Earth Care Gunma Shikishima Football Stadium; Attendance: 187; Referee: Masakazu Kato

=== Group B ===
Pos	Team	Pld	W	D	L	GF	GA	GD	Pts	Qualification
1	Okinawa SV	3	2	1	0	9	0	+9	7	Advance to the final round
2	Veroskronos Tsuno	3	1	1	1	4	6	−2	4	
3	Artista Asama	3	0	2	1	3	9	−6	2	
4	Cobaltore Onagawa	3	0	2	1	2	3	−1	2	

Source: JFFMS

11 November 2022	Artista Asama	0–6	Okinawa SV	Niigata, Niigata
10:45		Report (JFA)	Ichiki 7', 29'; Anzai 37'; Yamada 58'; Arai 76'; Gibo 90+2'	Stadium: Niigata Athletic Stadium; Attendance: 223; Referee: Yasuyuki Matsumoto

11 November 2022	Veroskronos Tsuno	2–1	Cobaltore Onagawa	Niigata, Niigata
13:30	Kajiyama 62'; Yanagida 90+5'	Report (JFA)	Takeda 7'	Stadium: Niigata Athletic Stadium; Attendance: 215; Referee: Satoshi Oba

12 November 2022	Artista Asama	2–2	Veroskronos Tsuno	Niigata, Niigata
10:45	Okamoto 43'; Nakazawa 72'	Report (JFA)	Kajiyama 1'; Awatari 90+1'	Stadium: Niigata Athletic Stadium; Attendance: 220; Referee: Ryo Munakata

12 November 2022	Okinawa SV	0–0	Cobaltore Onagawa	Niigata, Niigata
13:30		Report (JFA)		Stadium: Niigata Athletic Stadium; Attendance: 262; Referee: Sho Yanagida

13 November 2022	Artista Asama	1–1	Cobaltore Onagawa	Niigata, Niigata
10:45	Nakajima 42'	Report (JFA)	Noguchi 29'	Stadium: Niigata Athletic Stadium; Attendance: 189; Referee: Yasuyuki Matsumoto

13 November 2022	Okinawa SV	3–0	Veroskronos Tsuno	Niigata, Niigata
13:30	Ichiki 12'; Yamada 54', 79'	Report (JFA)		Stadium: Niigata Athletic Stadium; Attendance: 170; Referee: Akira Munakata

=== Group C ===
Pos	Team	Pld	W	D	L	GF	GA	GD	Pts	Qualification
1	Briobecca Urayasu	3	3	0	0	5	2	+3	9	Advance to the final round
2	Fukuyama City	3	2	0	1	4	2	+2	6	
3	Arterivo Wakayama	3	1	0	2	3	5	−2	3	
4	FC Tokushima	3	0	0	3	3	6	−3	0	

Source: JFFMS

11 November 2022	Arterivo Wakayama	0–2	Fukuyama City	Naruto, Tokushima
10:45		Report (JFA)	Taguchi 66' (pen.); Matsuoka 76' (pen.)	Stadium: Pocarisweat Stadium; Attendance: 200; Referee: Yasuhiro Udagawa

11 November 2022	Briobecca Urayasu	2–1	FC Tokushima	Naruto, Tokushima
13:30	Hayashi 2'; Kato 23'	Report (JFA)	Misao 78'	Stadium: Pocarisweat Stadium; Attendance: 350; Referee: Toshiro Hori

12 November 2022	Arterivo Wakayama	1–2	Briobecca Urayasu	Naruto, Tokushima
10:45	Seki 11'	Report (JFA)	Fujioka 39'; Kato 49'	Stadium: Pocarisweat Stadium; Attendance: 250; Referee: Tomomasa Toshiki

12 November 2022	Fukuyama City	2–1	FC Tokushima	Naruto, Tokushima
13:30	Tsukada 84'; Komatsu 90+4'	Report (JFA)	Kubota 26'	Stadium: Pocarisweat Stadium; Attendance: 700; Referee: Yasuhiro Udagawa

13 November 2022	Arterivo Wakayama	2–1	FC Tokushima	Naruto, Tokushima
10:45	Takahashi 50'; Horino 62'	Report (JFA)	Misao 57'	Stadium: Pocarisweat Stadium; Attendance: 400; Referee: Toshiro Hori

13 November 2022	Fukuyama City	0–1	Briobecca Urayasu	Naruto, Tokushima
13:30		Report (JFA)	Ikawa 64'	Stadium: Pocarisweat Stadium; Attendance: 200; Referee: Tomomasa Toshiki

== Ranking of second-placed teams ==
The three winners of each group of the first round qualifies for the final round, alongside the best-placed team among the runners-up of each group.

Pos	Team	Pld	W	D	L	GF	GA	GD	Pts	Qualification
1	Tochigi City	3	2	1	0	5	2	+3	7	Qualification for the final round
2	Fukuyama City	3	2	0	1	4	2	+2	6	
3	Veroskronos Tsuno	3	1	1	1	4	6	−2	4	

Source: JFFMS

== Final round ==
The group had matches played in a round-robin format. Slightly different from the previous round, each of the four teams qualified to this stage plays three matches in a five-days span, from 23 to 27 November. The top 2 teams qualified to the 2023 Japan Football League, as before mentioned.

Pos	Team	Pld	W	D	L	GF	GA	GD	Pts	Promotion
1	Briobecca Urayasu	3	2	1	0	4	1	+3	7	Promoted to the JFL
2	Okinawa SV	3	1	2	0	4	0	+4	5	Promoted to the JFL
3	Tochigi City	3	1	1	1	3	3	0	4	
4	FC Kariya	3	0	0	3	0	7	−7	0	

Source: JFFMS

23 November 2022	Okinawa SV	0–0	Briobecca Urayasu	Kumagaya, Saitama
10:45		Report (JFL)		Stadium: Kumagaya Athletic Stadium; Attendance: 449; Referee: Yoshihito Hori

23 November 2022	Tochigi City	2–0	FC Kariya	Kumagaya, Saitama
13:30	Caletti 12'; Jo Yeong-cheol 73'	Report (JFL)		Stadium: Kumagaya Athletic Stadium; Attendance: 398; Referee: Takamasa Funahashi

25 November 2022	Okinawa SV	0–0	Tochigi City	Kumagaya, Saitama
10:45		Report (JFL)		Stadium: Kumagaya Athletic Stadium; Attendance: 432; Referee: Kiminori Yasukawa

25 November 2022	Briobecca Urayasu	1–0	FC Kariya	Kumagaya, Saitama
13:30	Uematsu 90+3'	Report (JFL)		Stadium: Kumagaya Athletic Stadium; Attendance: 302; Referee: Hiroki Tanabe

27 November 2022	Okinawa SV	4–0	FC Kariya	Kumagaya, Saitama
10:45	Yamada 13', 38'; Ichiki 42'; Arai 46'	Report (JFL)		Stadium: Kumagaya Athletic Stadium; Attendance: 773; Referee: Tomomasa Toshiki

27 November 2022	Briobecca Urayasu	3–1	Tochigi City	Kumagaya, Saitama
13:30	Ito 32'; Murakami 48'; Uematsu 87'	Report (JFL)	Yoshida 75'	Stadium: Kumagaya Athletic Stadium; Attendance: 1,117; Referee: Masashi Harada

== Top scorers ==
Rank	Player	Club	Goals
1	(Japan) Yuto Yamada	Okinawa SV	5
2	(Japan) Ryuichi Ichiki	Okinawa SV	4
2	(Japan) Rai Ijuin	Nobeoka Agata	4
4	(Australia) Joe Caletti	Tochigi City	3
5	(Japan) Shuga Arai	Okinawa SV	2
5	(Japan) Shuto Kammera	BTOP Thank Kuriyama	2
5	(Japan) Kanta Kajiyama	Veroskronos Tsuno	2
5	(Japan) Daisuke Kato	Briobecca Urayasu	2
5	(Japan) Tsubasa Misao	FC Tokushima	2
5	(Japan) Masato Nomura	FC Kariya	2
5	(Japan) Naoto Suzuki	FC Kariya	2
5	(Japan) Yo Uematsu	Briobecca Urayasu	2
