= Kakeru =

Kakeru is a Japanese given name. Notable people with the name include:

- Kakeru Ayabe (綾部 翔; born 1997), Japanese baseball player
- Kakeru Funaki (舩木 翔; born 1998), Japanese footballer
- Kakeru Kobashiri (虎走かける; born 1986), Japanese novelist
- Kakeru Kumagai (熊谷 翔; born 2002), Japanese badminton player
- Kakeru Kumagawa (熊川 翔; born 1997), Japanese footballer
- Kakeru Narita (成田 翔; born 1998), Japanese baseball player
- Kakeru Nishiyama (born 1995), Japanese karateka
- Kakeru Okumura (奥村 翔; born 1998), Japanese rugby union fullback
- Kakeru Sekiguchi (関口翔; born 1994), Japanese professional wrestler
- Kakeru Suminaga (住永 翔; born 1998), Japanese footballer
- Kakeru Tanigawa (谷川 翔; born 1999), Japanese artistic gymnast
- Kakeru Yamanobe (山野辺 翔; born 1994), Japanese baseball player

== Fictional characters ==
- Kakeru, a female character from the manga and anime series Kekkaishi
- Kakeru Ryuuen, a male character from the light novel series Classroom of the Elite
