= Shun Sato =

Shun Sato may refer to:

- Shun Sato (figure skater) (佐藤 駿, born 2004), Japanese figure skater
- Shun Sato (footballer) (佐藤 隼), Japanese footballer
