= Kakeru Kumagawa =

Japanese footballer

Kakeru Kumagawa 熊川 翔
Personal information
- Date of birth: 2 April 1997 (age 29)
- Place of birth: Saitama, Japan
- Height: 1.73 m (5 ft 8 in)
- Position: Defender

Team information
- Current team: Nankatsu SC
- Number: 52

Youth career
- Ohmashi Sunrise
- 2007–2015: Kashiwa Reysol
- 2016–2017: Ryutsu Keizai University

Senior career*
Years	Team	Apps	(Gls)
2017–2019	Iwaki FC	26	(6)
2020–2021	Yokohama FC	2	(0)
2021	→ YSCC Yokohama (loan)	0	(0)
2022	BTOP Thank Kuriyama	14	(6)
2023–	Nankatsu SC	0	(0)
- * Club domestic league appearances and goals as of 22 February 2023, 13:43 (UTC)

Kakeru Kumagawa (熊川 翔, Kumagawa Kakeru; born 2 April 1997) is a Japanese footballer who plays as a right-back and currently plays for Nankatsu SC of the Kanto Soccer League.

== Career statistics ==
=== Club ===
As of 7 March 2023

Club	Season	League			National Cup		League Cup		Other		Total	
Club	Season	Division	Apps	Goals	Apps	Goals	Apps	Goals	Apps	Goals	Apps	Goals
Iwaki FC	2018	Tohoku Soccer League	9	4	1 (Note: Appearances in the Emperor's Cup)	0	0	0	0	0	10	4
Iwaki FC	2019	Tohoku Soccer League	17	2	1	0	0	0	3 (Note: Appearances in the Japanese Regional Football League Competition)	0	21	2
Iwaki FC	Total		26	6	2	0	0	0	3	0	31	6
Yokohama FC	2020	J1 League	2	0	0	0	0	0	0	0	2	0
Yokohama FC	2021	J1 League	0	0	0	0	0	0	0	0	0	0
Yokohama FC	Total		2	0	0	0	0	0	0	0	2	0
YSCC Yokohama (loan)	2021	J3 League	0	0	0	0	0	0	0	0	0	0
YSCC Yokohama (loan)	Total		0	0	0	0	0	0	0	0	0	0
BTOP Thank Kuriyama	2022	Hokkaido Soccer League	14	6	0	0	0	0	0	0	14	6
BTOP Thank Kuriyama	Total		14	6	0	0	0	0	0	0	14	6
Nankatsu SC	2023	Kanto Soccer League	0	0	0	0	0	0	0	0	0	0
Nankatsu SC	Total		0	0	0	0	0	0	0	0	0	0
Career total			42	12	2	0	0	0	3	0	48	12
