= Ryu Nugraha =

Japanese footballer (born 2000)

Personal information
- Full name: Ryu Nugraha
- Date of birth: 6 April 2000 (age 26)
- Place of birth: Nagano, Japan
- Height: 1.83 m (6 ft 0 in)
- Position: Goalkeeper

Team information
- Current team: AC Nagano Parceiro
- Number: 31

Youth career
- 2013–2015: Shioda Junior High School
- 2016–2018: Ueda Chikuma High School

Senior career*
Years	Team	Apps	(Gls)
2019–	AC Nagano Parceiro	0	(0)
2020–2021	→ Fukui United FC (loan)	11	(0)
2023–2024	→ BTOP Hokkaido (loan)	0	(0)
- * Club domestic league appearances and goals

Ryu Nugraha (Japanese: リュウ・ヌグラハ; born 6 April 2000) is a Japanese professional footballer who plays as a goalkeeper for J3 League club AC Nagano Parceiro.

== Early life ==
Nugraha is of Indonesian descent from his father.

== Club career ==
Before the 2020 season, Nugraha was sent on loan to Japanese side Fukui United FC, helping the club win the league.

Nugraha has not played a match for J3 League club AC Nagano Parceiro, until he eventually sent out on another loan spell, this time with BTOP Hokkaido on 19 October 2023.

== International career ==
Nugraha has been regarded as an Indonesia national team prospect.

== Style of play ==
Nugraha is known for his reflexes.

== Personal life ==
Nugraha enjoys bowling.
