= Ryosuke Ochi =

Japanese footballer

Ryosuke Ochi 越智 亮介
Personal information
- Full name: Ryosuke Ochi
- Date of birth: April 7, 1990 (age 36)
- Place of birth: Imabari, Ehime, Japan
- Height: 1.69 m (5 ft 6 1/2 in)
- Position: Midfielder

Team information
- Current team: FC Imabari
- Number: 19

Youth career
- 2006–2008: Oita Trinita

Senior career*
Years	Team	Apps	(Gls)
2009–2012	Ehime FC	69	(1)
2013–2014	Zweigen Kanazawa	49	(5)
2015–2018	Fujieda MYFC	100	(11)
2019	FC Ryukyu	22	(2)
2020–	FC Ryukyu	5	(0)
- * Club domestic league appearances and goals as of 21:43, 8 August 2020 (UTC)

Ryosuke Ochi (越智 亮介, born April 7, 1990) is a Japanese football player who plays for FC Imabari.

== Career statistics ==
Updated to 23 February 2018.

Appearances and goals by club, season and competition
Club	Season	League			Emperor's Cup		Total	
Club	Season	Division	Apps	Goals	Apps	Goals	Apps	Goals
Ehime FC	2009	J2 League	6	0	0	0	6	0
Ehime FC	2010	J2 League	31	1	1	0	32	1
Ehime FC	2011	J2 League	32	0	2	0	34	0
Ehime FC	2012	J2 League	0	0	0	0	0	0
Zweigen Kanazawa	2013	JFL	33	4	3	0	36	4
Zweigen Kanazawa	2014	J3 League	16	1	0	0	16	1
Fujieda MYFC	2015	J3 League	36	5	3	0	39	5
Fujieda MYFC	2016	J3 League	29	1	–		29	1
Fujieda MYFC	2017	J3 League	21	4	–		21	4
Career total			204	16	9	0	213	16
