= Gifu Kyoritsu University =

Private university in Ogaki, Gifu, Japan

Coordinates: 35°23′39.6″N 136°37′11.3″E

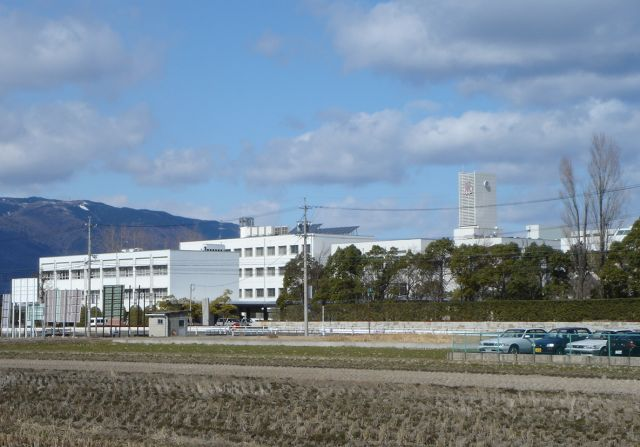
Gifu Kyoritsu University

Gifu Kyoritsu University (岐阜協立大学, Gifu kyōritsu daigaku), formerly Gifu Keizai University (岐阜経済大学, Gifu keizai daigaku), is a private university at Ogaki, Gifu, Japan, founded in 1967.
