= Kei Shibata =

Japanese footballer and manager

Personal information
- Date of birth: 8 December 1965 (age 60)
- Place of birth: Nerima, Tokyo, Japan
- Height: 1.73 m (5 ft 8 in)
- Position: Defender

Youth career
- 1981–1984: Shakujii HS
- 1985–1988: Tokyo Gakugei University

Senior career*
Years	Team	Apps	(Gls)
1988–1990	All Nippon Airways	0	(0)
1992	Tokyo Gas	0	(0)

Managerial career
- 1994–1996: Tokyo Pele Hachioji Junior Youth
- 1997–1998: Tokyo Gas Junior Youth
- 1999–2003: FC Tokyo Youth
- 2005–2008: Tokyo Verdy Youth
- 2009: Tokyo Verdy (assistant)
- 2010: Ryutsu Keizai University FC
- 2011–2015: Matsumoto Yamaga (assistant)
- 2016: Matsumoto Yamaga Youth (assistant)
- 2017: Briobecca Urayasu
- 2020–2021: Matsumoto Yamaga
- 2022: ReinMeer Aomori
- * Club domestic league appearances and goals

Kei Shibata (柴田 峡, Shibata Kei; born 8 December 1965) is a Japanese former footballer and current manager Japan Football League club of ReinMeer Aomori

== Career statistics ==
=== Club ===
Club	Season	League			National Cup		League Cup		Continental		Other		Total	
Club	Season	Division	Apps	Goals	Apps	Goals	Apps	Goals	Apps	Goals	Apps	Goals	Apps	Goals
All Nippon Airways	1988–89	JSL	0	0	0	0	0	0	0	0	0	0	0	0
All Nippon Airways	1989–90	JSL	0	0	0	0	0	0	0	0	0	0	0	0
All Nippon Airways	Total		0	0	0	0	0	0	0	0	0	0	0	0
Tokyo Gas	1992	JSL	0	0	0	0	0	0	0	0	0	0	0	0
Career total			0	0	0	0	0	0	0	0	0	0	0	0

== Managerial statistics ==
As of 28 March 2021.

Managerial record by team and tenure
Team	From	To	Record				
Team	From	To	P	W	D	L	Win %
Ryutsu Keizai University FC	2010	2010	34	5	4	25	14.7
Briobecca Urayasu	2017	2017	15	4	5	6	26.7
Matsumoto Yamaga	2020	2021	26	9	11	6	34.6
ReinMeer Aomori	2022	present					
Total			75	18	20	37	24.0
