= Nobuyuki Shiina =

Japanese footballer

Personal information
- Full name: Nobuyuki Shiina
- Date of birth: October 15, 1991 (age 35)
- Place of birth: Sapporo, Japan
- Height: 1.66 m (5 ft 5 1/2 in)
- Position: Midfielder

Team information
- Current team: Kataller Toyama
- Number: 22

Youth career
- –2006: Sapporo JFC
- 2007–2009: Aomori Yamada High School

College career
Years	Team	Apps	(Gls)
2010–2013	Ryutsu Keizai University		

Senior career*
Years	Team	Apps	(Gls)
2014–2016	Matsumoto Yamaga FC	19	(0)
2015–2016	→ Kataller Toyama (loan)	9	(0)
2017–	Kataller Toyama	184	(16)
- * Club domestic league appearances and goals as of 16 August 2026

Nobuyuki Shiina (椎名 伸志, Shiina Nobuyuki; born October 15, 1991 in Hokkaido) is a Japanese football player. He plays for Kataller Toyama.

== Playing career ==
Nobuyuki Shiina joined to Matsumoto Yamaga FC in 2014. In July 2015, he moved to Kataller Toyama.

== Club statistics ==
Updated to 23 February 2018.

Appearances and goals by club, season and competition
Club	Season	League			Emperor's Cup		J. League Cup		Total	
Club	Season	Division	Apps	Goals	Apps	Goals	Apps	Goals	Apps	Goals
Matsumoto Yamaga	2014	J2 League	19	0	2	1	–		21	1
Matsumoto Yamaga	2015	J1 League	0	0	0	0	4	0	4	0
Kataller Toyama	2015	J3 League	4	0	0	0	–		4	0
Kataller Toyama	2016	J3 League	5	0	0	0	–		5	0
Kataller Toyama	2017	J3 League	26	2	2	1	–		28	3
Total			54	2	4	2	4	0	62	4
