= Koya Shimizu =

Japanese footballer

Personal information
- Full name: Koya Shimizu
- Date of birth: June 15, 1982 (age 44)
- Place of birth: Tokyo, Japan
- Height: 1.69 m (5 ft 6 1/2 in)
- Position: Midfielder

Team information
- Current team: Briobecca Urayasu
- Number: 10

Youth career
- 1998–2000: Tokyo Verdy
- 2001–2004: Kokushikan University

Senior career*
Years	Team	Apps	(Gls)
2005–2006	Vegalta Sendai	18	(0)
2007–2009	Sagan Tosu	48	(3)
2010	Tokyo Verdy	1	(0)
2011–	Briobecca Urayasu		
Total		67	(3)
- * Club domestic league appearances and goals as of December 31, 2015

Koya Shimizu (清水 康也, Shimizu Kōya; born June 15, 1982) is a Japanese football player. He plays for Briobecca Urayasu.

== Club statistics ==
Club performance			League		Cup		Total	
Season	Club	League	Apps	Goals	Apps	Goals	Apps	Goals
Japan			League		Emperor's Cup		Total	
2001	Kokushikan University	JFL	10	1	-		10	1
2002	Kokushikan University	JFL	4	1			4	1
2003	Kokushikan University	JFL	3	0	-		3	0
2004	Kokushikan University	JFL	6	3	-		6	3
2005	Vegalta Sendai	J2 League	16	0	2	0	18	0
2006	Vegalta Sendai	J2 League	2	0	0	0	2	0
2007	Sagan Tosu	J2 League	21	2	1	0	22	2
2008	Sagan Tosu	J2 League	23	1	4	0	27	1
2009	Sagan Tosu	J2 League	4	0	0	0	4	0
2010	Tokyo Verdy	J2 League	0	0	0	0	0	0
Total			85	8	7	0	92	8
