= Shun Sato (footballer) =

Japanese footballer (born 1997)

Shun Sato 佐藤 隼
Personal information
- Full name: Shun Sato
- Date of birth: 6 March 1997 (age 29)
- Place of birth: Yokohama, Japan
- Height: 1.84 m (6 ft 1/2 in)
- Position: Goalkeeper

Team information
- Current team: Oita Trinita
- Number: 24

Youth career
- Shirane SC
- –2011: Banderilla Yokohama
- 2012–2014: Daiichi Gakuin High School

College career
| Years | Team | Apps | (Gls) |
| 2015 | Sanno Institute of Management | | |

Senior career*
| Years | Team | Apps | (Gls) |
| 2016–2018 | Fujieda MYFC | 7 | (0) |
| 2019 | Suzuka Unlimited | 5 | (0) |
| 2020–2021 | Veroskronos Tsuno | 11 | (0) |
| 2022 | BTOP Thank Kuriyama | 14 | (0) |
| 2023–2024 | Verspah Oita | 32 | (0) |
| 2025– | Oita Trinita | 0 | (0) |
- * Club domestic league appearances and goals as of 23 January 2026

Shun Sato (佐藤 隼, Satō Shun; born March 6, 1997) is a Japanese football player who plays as Goalkeeper and currently play for Oita Trinita on the J2 League.

== Career ==
In 2022, Sato joined to Hokkaido Soccer League club, BTOP Thank Kuriyama for 2022 season.

On 27 February 2023, Sato announcement officially transfer to JFL club, Verspah Oita for ahead of 2023 season.

== Career statistics ==
=== Club ===
Updated to the end of 2023 season.

| Club performance | | | League | | Cup | | Other | | Total | |
| Season | Club | League | Apps | Goals | Apps | Goals | Apps | Goals | Apps | Goals |
| Japan | | | League | | Emperor's Cup | | Other | | Total | |
|---|---|---|---|---|---|---|---|---|---|---|
| 2016 | Fujieda MYFC | J3 League | 0 | 0 | – | | – | | 0 | 0 |
| 2017 | Fujieda MYFC | J3 League | 7 | 0 | – | | – | | 7 | 0 |
| 2018 | Fujieda MYFC | J3 League | 0 | 0 | – | | – | | 0 | 0 |
| 2019 | Suzuka Unlimited | JFL | 5 | 0 | – | | – | | 5 | 0 |
| 2020 | Veroskronos Tsuno | KYSL | 3 | 0 | – | | 3 (Note: Appearances in Japanese Regional Football Champions League) | 0 | 6 | 0 |
| 2021 | Veroskronos Tsuno | KYSL | 8 | 0 | – | | – | | 8 | 0 |
| 2022 | BTOP Thank Kuriyama | HSL | 14 | 0 | – | | – | | 14 | 0 |
| 2023 | Verspah Oita | JFL | 9 | 0 | 1 | 0 | – | | 0 | 0 |
| 2024 | Verspah Oita | JFL | 0 | 0 | 0 | 0 | – | | 0 | 0 |
| Total | | | 45 | 0 | 1 | 0 | 3 | 0 | 49 | 0 |
