= Hisao Mita =

Japanese footballer

Personal information
- Full name: Hisao Mita
- Date of birth: May 20, 1991 (age 35)
- Place of birth: Tochigi, Japan
- Height: 1.77 m (5 ft 9 1/2 in)
- Position: Midfielder

Youth career
- 2007–2009: FC Tokyo
- 2010–2013: Toyo University

Senior career*
Years	Team	Apps	(Gls)
2014	YSCC Yokohama	32	(1)
Total		32	(1)
- * Club domestic league appearances and goals

Hisao Mita (三田 尚央, Mita Hisao; born May 20, 1991) is a former Japanese football player.

== Playing career ==
Hisao Mita played for J3 League club; YSCC Yokohama in 2014.
