= FC Nobeoka Agata =

Japanese football club

Nobeoka Agata FC延岡AGATA
- Full name: Football Club Nobeoka Agata
- Founded: 2019; 7 years ago
- Ground: Nobeoka Nishishina Athletic Stadium
- Capacity: 15,000
- Owner(s): FC Nobeoka Agata Co., Ltd.
- Chairman: Eiichi Kawahara
- Manager: Kazuo Waseda
- League: Kyushu Soccer League
- 2025: 3rd of 10
- Website: fc-agata.com

FC Nobeoka Agata (FC延岡AGATA, Efu Shi Nobeoka Agata) are a Japanese football club based in Nobeoka, Miyazaki. They play in the Kyushu Soccer League. They played in the Regional Champions League for the first time in 2022, as they qualified for the competition as 2022 Shakaijin Cup semi-finalists.

== Squad (2023) ==
Note: Flags indicate national team as defined under FIFA eligibility rules; some limited exceptions apply. Players may hold more than one non-FIFA nationality.

No.	Pos.	Nation	Player
1	GK	JPN	Yu Tabuchi
2	DF	JPN	Masaki Tanaka
3	MF	JPN	Kaoru Ikemoto
4	FW	JPN	Takuma Fukazawa
5	DF	JPN	Ryushin Hisano
6	MF	JPN	Minato Kamei
7	DF	JPN	Shogo Toyomura
8	MF	JPN	Ran Otsubo
9	FW	JPN	Riku Amakawa
10	MF	JPN	Shingo Moriyama
11	FW	JPN	Shun Uchikoshi
12	GK	JPN	Tsukasa Kohara
13	FW	JPN	Taiki Uchiyamada

No.	Pos.	Nation	Player
14	MF	JPN	Shoto Morinaga
15	MF	JPN	Atsushi Kawahara
16	MF	JPN	Masaki Sakai
17	FW	JPN	Shinya Emoto
18	MF	JPN	Takuma Teramoto
19	DF	JPN	Kanji Murayama
20	DF	JPN	Masaya Inoue
21	MF	JPN	Kyoshiro Aoyama
22	GK	JPN	Reona Aburaki
23	DF	JPN	Koya Fujimatsu
24	FW	JPN	Hirotada Udo
26	FW	JPN	Ren Yamamoto
28	MF	JPN	Hiroto Kurakazu

== Coaching staff ==
As of 30 April 2024.

Position	Staff
Manager	(Japan) Kazuo Waseda
Assistant manager	(Japan) Kazuhiko Isobe
Goalkeeper coach	(Japan) Toi Nakamura
Trainer	(Japan) Takehiro Fujita (Japan) Ami Sato
Side manager	(Japan) Fumiya Eikawa
CEO	(Japan) Eiichi Kawahara
General manager	(Japan) Itta Kuwahara
Development manager	(Japan) Junji Yamamoto

== League and Cup record ==
Champions	Runners-up	Third place	Promoted	Relegated

League											Emperor's Cup	Shakaijin	JRCL
Season	Division	Pos.	P	W	D	L	F	A	GD	Pts	Emperor's Cup	Shakaijin	JRCL
2019	Miyazaki Prefectural League 2nd Division	1st	6	6	0	0	24	3	+21	18	Did not qualify	Did not qualify	Did not qualify
2020	Miyazaki Prefectural League 1st Division	Cancelled due to the COVID-19 pandemic									Did not qualify	Did not qualify	Did not qualify
2021	Miyazaki Prefectural League 1st Division	Cancelled due to the COVID-19 pandemic									Did not qualify	Did not qualify	Did not qualify
2022	Kyushu Soccer League	2nd	20	15	2	3	68	10	+58	47	Did not qualify	3rd place	Group stage
2023	Kyushu Soccer League	2nd	18	15	2	1	74	6	68	47	Did not qualify	Quarter-finals	Did not qualify
2024	Kyushu Soccer League	3rd	18	13	1	4	66	16	50	40	Did not qualify	1st round	Did not qualify
2025	Kyushu Soccer League	3rd	18	13	4	1	49	13	36	43	Did not qualify	TBD	TBD
2026	Kyushu Soccer League	TBD	18								Did not qualify	TBD	TBD

Key

- Pos. = Position in league; P = Games played; W = Games won; D = Games drawn; L = Games lost; F = Goals scored; A = Goals conceded; GD = Goal difference; Pts = Points won

== Honours ==
FC Nobeoka Agata honours
Honour	No.	Years
Miyazaki Prefectural League 2nd Division	1	2019
