= Yo Uematsu =

Japanese footballer

Yo Uematsu 上松瑛
Personal information
- Full name: Yo Uematsu
- Date of birth: 12 September 1991 (age 35)
- Place of birth: Kyoto, Japan
- Height: 1.77 m (5 ft 10 in)
- Position: Midfielder

Team information
- Current team: Briobecca Urayasu
- Number: 14

Youth career
- 2008–2010: Rakunan High School
- 2011–2013: Meiji University

Senior career*
Years	Team	Apps	(Gls)
2014–2017	Briobecca Urayasu	84	(7)
2018–2020	Gainare Tottori	76	(2)
2021–	Briobecca Urayasu	16	(2)
- * Club domestic league appearances and goals as of 27 November 2022, 11:36 (UTC)

Yo Uematsu (上松瑛, Uematsu Yo; born 12 September 1991 in Kurayoshi, Tottori) is a Japanese footballer playing for Briobecca Urayasu.

== Career ==
After playing for the football team of Meiji University, Uematsu joined Briobecca Urayasu in January 2014. After four seasons, Uematsu moved to Gainare Tottori to play professional football in J3 League.

In 2021, after leaving Tottori, he returned to his former club Briobecca Urayasu, after 4 years since his short-lasted departure. On 27 November 2022, he scored Briobecca's third goal at the 87th minute, helping his side to comfortably lead a 3–1 win against Tochigi City FC at the 2022 Japanese Regional Football Champions League. This win allowed Briobecca to win the tournament's title for the first time in history, and promoted them to the 2023 Japan Football League.

== Club statistics ==
As of match played 27 November 2022.

Club performance			League		Cup		Total	
Season	Club	League	Apps	Goals	Apps	Goals	Apps	Goals
Japan			League		Emperor's Cup		Total	
2014	Briobecca Urayasu	Kantō Soccer League (Div.1)	10	2	2	1	12	3
2015	Briobecca Urayasu	Kantō Soccer League (Div.1)	16	4	–		16	4
2016	Briobecca Urayasu	Japan Football League	26	0	–		26	0
2017	Briobecca Urayasu	Japan Football League	30	1	2	1	32	2
2018	Gainare Tottori	J3 League	27	0	2	0	29	0
2019	Gainare Tottori	J3 League	25	1	2	0	27	1
2020	Gainare Tottori	J3 League	24	1	2	0	26	1
2021	Briobecca Urayasu	Kantō Soccer League (Div.1)	15	1	0	0	15	1
2022	Briobecca Urayasu	Kantō Soccer League (Div.1)	12	0	3	0	15	0
Career total			185	10	13	2	198	12

== Honours ==
Briobecca Urayasu

- Japanese Regional Football Champions League: 2022
