= Jun Arima =

Japanese footballer and coach (born 1992)

Personal information
- Full name: Jun Arima
- Date of birth: 6 August 1992 (age 34)
- Place of birth: Uwajima, Ehime, Japan
- Height: 1.68 m (5 ft 6 in)
- Position: Forward

Youth career
- 2008–2010: Uwajima Higashi High School
- 2011–2014: Kochi University

Senior career*
Years	Team	Apps	(Gls)
2015–2017	Sony Sendai FC	80	(46)
2018–2021	FC Imabari	75	(24)
2022	Vanraure Hachinohe	15	(0)
Total		170	(70)
- * Club domestic league appearances and goals

Jun Arima (Japanese: 有間 潤, Arima Jun; born 6 August 1992) is a Japanese former professional footballer who played as a Forward. He is currently a coach.

== Early life ==
Arima was born in Uwajima, Ehime Prefecture, Japan.

== Playing career ==
Arima attended Uwajima Higashi High School, where he was selected as an outstanding player at the 2010 Inter-High School Championships. He later played for Kochi University and was selected for the Chugoku-Shikoku representative team in the Denso Cup Challenge Tournament in 2012 and 2013.

In 2015, Arima joined Japan Football League club Sony Sendai FC. He scored 10 goals in his debut season and helped the club win its first JFL title. He was named the JFL Rookie of the Year and selected to the league Best XI.

Between 2016 and 2018, Arima was selected to the JFL Best XI for three consecutive seasons. He finished second in the league scoring rankings in both 2016 and 2017.

In 2018, he transferred to FC Imabari. During his first season with the club, he scored 15 league goals and was again selected to the JFL Best XI.

Following FC Imabari's promotion to the J3 League, Arima continued with the club until the end of the 2021 season.

In 2022, he joined Vanraure Hachinohe. After one season with the club, his contract expired and he announced his retirement from professional football in January 2023.

Shortly after, Arima joined Macarthur FC as a strength and conditioning coach.

== Coaching career ==
Following his retirement, Arima became a homegrown coach for FC Imabari in 2023.

== Career statistics ==
Appearances and goals by club
Club	Season	League	Apps	Goals	Cup Apps	Cup Goals	Total Apps	Total Goals
Sony Sendai FC	2015	Japan Football League	29	10	0	0	29	10
Sony Sendai FC	2016	Japan Football League	27	19	1	0	28	19
Sony Sendai FC	2017	Japan Football League	24	17	1	0	25	17
FC Imabari	2018	Japan Football League	28	15	2	1	30	16
FC Imabari	2019	Japan Football League	25	6	0	0	25	6
FC Imabari	2020	J3 League	13	1	0	0	13	1
FC Imabari	2021	J3 League	9	2	2	0	11	2
Vanraure Hachinohe	2022	J3 League	15	0	1	0	16	0
Career total			170	70	7	1	177	71

== Honours ==
=== Club ===
Sony Sendai FC

- Japan Football League: 2015

=== Individual ===
- JFL Rookie of the Year: 2015
- JFL Best XI: 2015, 2016, 2017, 2018
