= Earth Care Gunma Shikishima Football Stadium =

Football stadium in Maebashi, Japan

Coordinates: 36°24′48″N 139°03′14″E

Gunma Shikishima Football Stadium
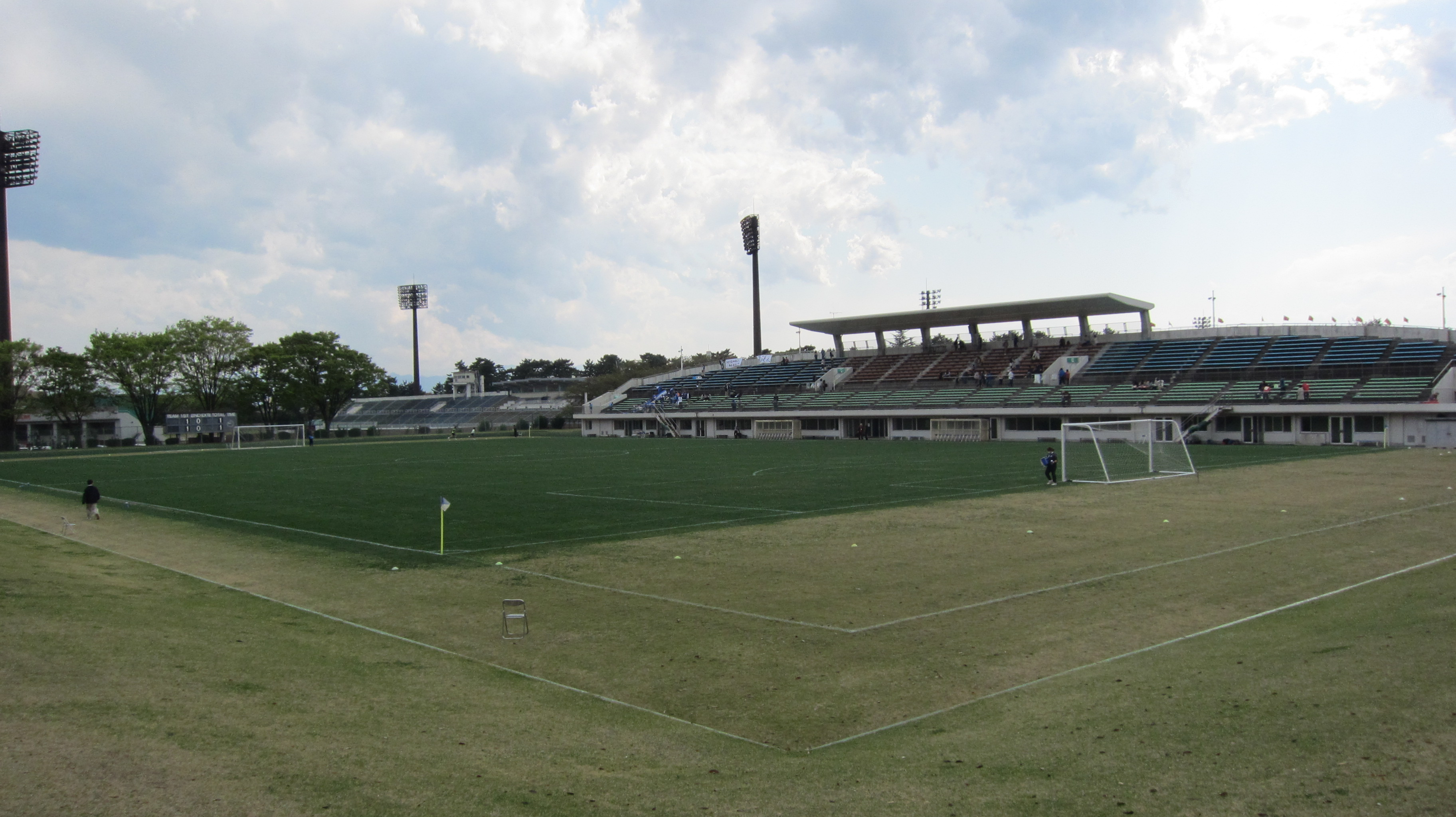
- Interactive map of Gunma Shikishima Football Stadium
- Location: Maebashi, Gunma Prefecture, Japan
- Owner: Gunma Prefecture
- Capacity: 7,800

Construction
- Opened: 1966

Tenant
- Tonan Maebashi

Gunma Shikishima Football Stadium (群馬県立敷島公園サッカー・ラグビー場) is a football stadium in Maebashi, Gunma Prefecture, Japan.

It was one of the home stadium of football club Thespa Kusatsu in 2005.

== See also ==
- Shoda Shoyu Stadium Gunma (Gunma Shikishima Athletic Stadium)
