= Toshiya Motozuka =

Japanese footballer

Personal information
- Date of birth: 20 May 1997 (age 29)
- Place of birth: Hokkaido, Japan
- Height: 1.80 m (5 ft 11 in)
- Position: Midfielder

Team information
- Current team: Tokyo Verdy
- Number: 30

Youth career
- –2015: Hokkaido Consadole Sapporo
- 2016–2019: Kanazawa Seiryo University

Senior career*
Years	Team	Apps	(Gls)
2020–	Zweigen Kanazawa	22	(0)
- * Club domestic league appearances and goals as of 17:04, 10 November 2020 (UTC)

Toshiya Motozuka (本塚 聖也, Motozuka Toshiya; born 20 May 1997) is a Japanese footballer currently playing as a midfielder for Zweigen Kanazawa.

== Career statistics ==
=== Club ===
As of 10 November 2020.

Club	Season	League			National Cup		League Cup		Other		Total	
Club	Season	Division	Apps	Goals	Apps	Goals	Apps	Goals	Apps	Goals	Apps	Goals
Zweigen Kanazawa	2020	J2 League	22	0	0	0	0	0	0	0	22	0
Career total			22	0	0	0	0	0	0	0	22	0
