= Briobecca Urayasu Ichikawa =

Japanese football club

Briobecca Urayasu Ichikawa ブリオベッカ浦安・市川
- Founded: 1989; 37 years ago
- Ground: Kashiwanoha Stadium; Kashiwa, Chiba
- Capacity: 20,000
- Chairman: Kazushi Taniguchi
- Manager: Satoshi Tsunami
- League: Japan Football League
- 2025: 3rd of 16
- Website: briobecca.jp
Home colours	Away colours

Briobecca Urayasu Ichikawa (ブリオベッカ浦安・市川, Buriobekka Urayasu Ichikawa) is a Japanese football (soccer) club based in Urayasu, Chiba. They currently play in Japan Football League, the fourth tier of Japanese football.

== History ==
Founded in 1989 as Urayasu Junior Football Club, the team was established in Chiba Prefecture. The name refers to a mix composed by Brionac, a spear appeared in Celtic mythology, and Becca, a one-seater ship used to collect nori, a Japanese cuisine delicacy, typical of that region. The mascot – Maiko Becca – was presented in 2017, one year after drawing its design. A JFL membership was granted in 2016, the season where Briobecca gained promotion to the 4th tier. After two seasons on the league, the club got demoted back to the Kantō Soccer League.

In 2022, the club participated in the 2022 Shakaijin Cup, winning the tournament. Their performance at the competition qualified the club to the 2022 Japanese Regional Football Champions League. Remaining unbeaten throughout the tournament, Briobecca Urayasu was able to win the title. Then, the club officially returned to the Japan Football League after a five-season absence from it. The club secured promotion, and the title, only at the final round, after a vital win over Tochigi City FC by 3–1, which also secured their first title in the competition. On the same year, the club recorded their worst performance at the Kanto League since their JFL relegation on 2017.

On 6 December 2024, Briobecca Urayasu announced that the club name will be changed to Briobecca Urayasu Ichikawa, valid from the 2025 season. They added Ichikawa in their name (and as one of their hometowns) to align with their intent of joining the J.League.

== Stadium ==
After playing at Briobecca Urayasu Stadium in 2022, Briobecca Urayasu return to home stadium at Kashiwanoha Stadium for 2023 season after two years at JFL in 2016–2017 end relegation on 10 February 2023 due to fully schedule.

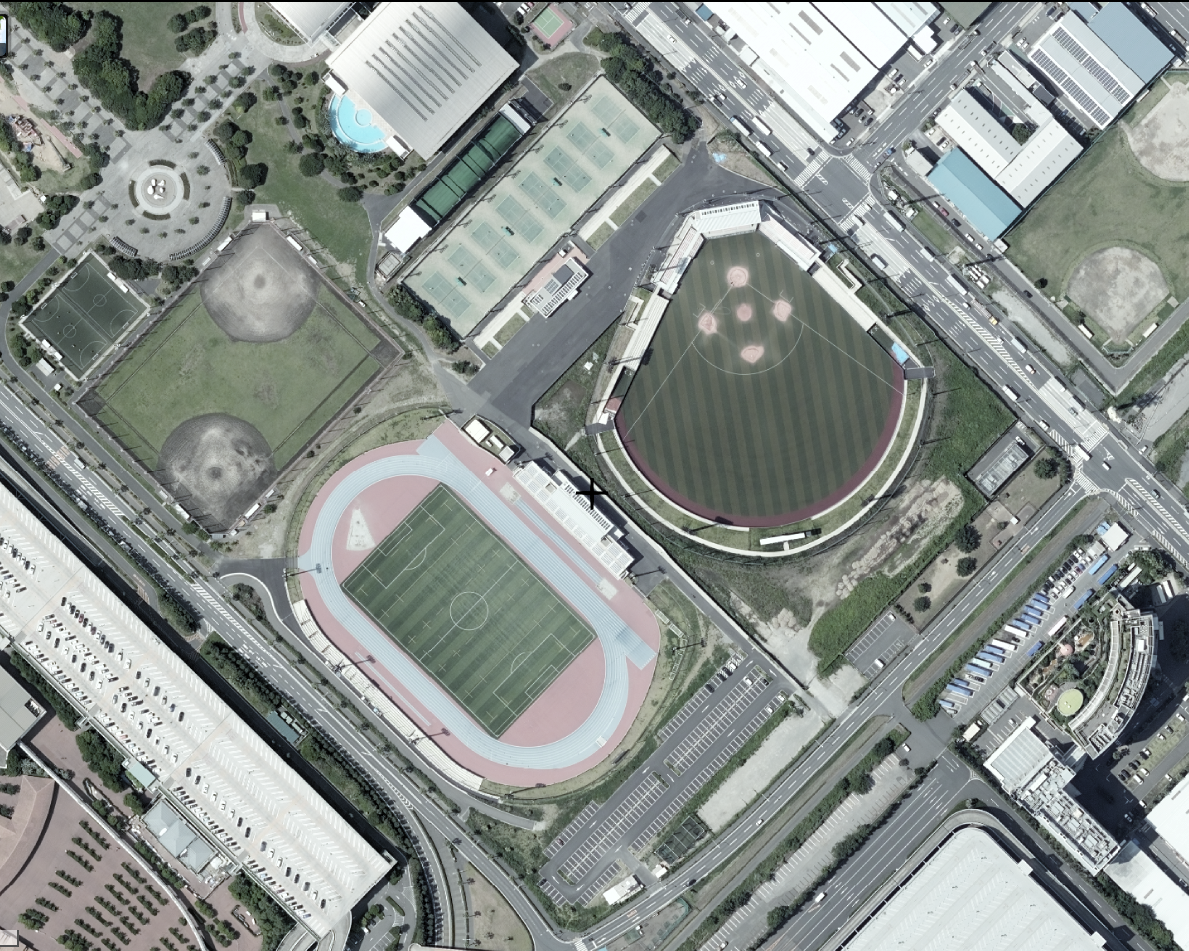
Briobecca Urayasu Stadium

== League record ==
Champions	Runners-up	Third place	Promoted	Relegated

League											Emperor's Cup	Shakaijin Cup
Season	League	Pos.	P	W	D	L	F	A	GD	Pts	Emperor's Cup	Shakaijin Cup
Urayasu Soccer Club
2012	Kantō Soccer League (Div. 2)	3rd	18	7	6	5	29	20	9	27	Did not qualify	Did not play
2013	Kantō Soccer League (Div. 2)	1st	18	17	1	0	94	11	83	52	1st round	Quarter-finals
2014	Kantō Soccer League (Div. 1)	1st	18	12	5	1	46	10	36	41	2nd round	Did not play
Briobecca Urayasu
2015	Kantō Soccer League (Div. 1)	1st	18	13	3	2	42	13	29	42	Did not qualify	1st round
2016	JFL	11th	30	11	3	16	39	47	-8	36	Did not qualify	Ineligible
2017	JFL	15th	30	6	8	16	24	46	-22	26	2nd round	Ineligible
2018	Kantō Soccer League (Div. 1)	6th	18	7	3	8	25	28	-3	24	Did not qualify	Did not play
2019	Kantō Soccer League (Div. 1)	4th	18	7	3	8	26	23	3	24	1st round	1st round
2020	Kantō Soccer League (Div. 1)	2nd	9	6	2	1	19	10	9	20	Did not qualify	Not held
2021	Kantō Soccer League (Div. 1)	2nd	22	15	4	3	54	19	35	49	Did not qualify	Did not play
2022	Kantō Soccer League (Div. 1)	6th	18	5	6	7	25	23	2	21	1st round	Winners
2023	JFL	2nd	28	12	9	7	40	35	5	45	2nd round	Ineligible
2024	JFL	8th	30	12	6	12	39	36	3	42	1st round	Ineligible
Briobecca Urayasu Ichikawa
2025	JFL	3rd	30	15	9	6	36	25	11	54	Did not qualify	Ineligible
2026–27	JFL	TBD	30								TBD	Ineligible

Key

- Pos. = Position in league; P = Games played; W = Games won; D = Games drawn; L = Games lost; F = Goals scored; A = Goals conceded; GD = Goals difference; Pts = Points gained

=== Emperor's Cup record ===
31 August 2013 2013 EC 1st round	Briobecca Urayasu	1−4 (a.e.t.)	University of Tsukuba	Naka, Ibaraki
15:00	Shimizu 36'	Report (JFA); Report (JFA)	Akasaki 22', 120+3'; Hayakawa 111'; Taniguchi 117'	Stadium: Kasamatsu Stadium; Attendance: 847; Referee: Kazuya Fujita

6 July 2014 2014 EC 1st round	Briobecca Urayasu	1−0	Grulla Morioka	Morioka, Iwate
13:00	Shimizu 21'	Report (JFA); Report (JFA)		Stadium: Morioka South Park Football Field; Attendance: 621; Referee: Hiroyuki Sumita

12 July 2014 2014 EC 2nd round	Briobecca Urayasu	2−8	Urawa Red Diamonds	Saitama, Saitama
18:00	Uematsu 37'; Shimizu 90+3'	Report (JFA); Report (JFA)	Abe 11'; Koroki 41', 77'; Ugajin 45+1'; Umesaki 52'; Moriwaki 58'; Suzuki 83'; Sekine 90+1'	Stadium: Urawa Komaba Stadium; Attendance: 7,275; Referee: Masaaki Iemoto

23 April 2017 2017 EC 1st round	Briobecca Urayasu	5−1	Nirasaki Astros	Kofu, Yamanashi
13:00	Kasamatsu 8'; Uematsu 12'; Soma 25'; Nambu 69'; Tomizuka 73'	Report (JFA); Report (JFA)	Koizumi 20'	Stadium: Yamanashi Chuo Bank Stadium; Attendance: 408; Referee: Takao Ueda

21 June 2017 2017 EC 2nd round	Briobecca Urayasu	0−1	Kashiwa Reysol	Kashiwa, Chiba
19:00		Report (JFA); Report (JFA)	Ramon Lopes 56'	Stadium: Sankyo Frontier Kashiwa Stadium; Attendance: 2,577; Referee: Yoshiro Imamura

26 May 2019 2019 EC 1st round	Briobecca Urayasu	0−1	Hosei University	Chiba, Chiba
13:00		Report (JFA); Report (JFA)	Takemoto 35'	Stadium: Fukuda Denshi Arena; Attendance: 761; Referee: Kazuyoshi Karashima

22 May 2022 2022 EC 1st round	Briobecca Urayasu	2−2 (a.e.t.) (3–5 p)	University of Tsukuba	Hitachinaka, Ibaraki
13:00	Hayashida 75' (o.g.); Inoue 101'	Report (JFA); Report (JFA)	Sumi 18'; Wada 115'	Stadium: Hitachinaka City Stadium; Attendance: 555; Referee: Yuki Murata
	Penalties
	Hashimoto (penalty scored); Ito (penalty scored); Taniguchi (penalty scored); Saitai (penalty missed)		Wada (penalty scored); Okita (penalty scored); Takeuchi (penalty scored); Kurihara (penalty scored); Shoji (penalty scored)

21 May 2023 2023 EC 1st round	Briobecca Urayasu	3−2	University of Tsukuba	Ichihara
13:00	Murakoshi 13'; Ito 34'; Hayashi 79'	Report; Report	Uchino 22'; Sumi 64'	Stadium: ZA Oripri Stadium; Attendance: 564; Referee: Masakazu Kato

7 June 2023 2023 EC 2nd round	Briobecca Urayasu	0−2	Yokohama F. Marinos	Yokohama
19:00		Report; Report	Inoue 26'; Eduardo 78'	Stadium: NHK Spring Mitsuzawa Football Stadium; Attendance: 4,287; Referee: Koichiro Fukushima

26 May 2024 2024 EC 1st round	Vanraure Hachinohe	2–0	Briobecca Urayasu	Hachinohe
13:00		Report	Otoizumi 30'; Senoo 85'	Stadium: Prifoods Stadium; Attendance: 693; Referee: Daichi Shiino

== Honours ==
Briobecca Urayasu Ichikawa honours
Honour	No.	Years
Kantō Soccer League Div. 2	1	2013
Chiba Prefectural Football Championship (Emperor's Cup Chiba Prefectural Qualifiers)	7	2013, 2014, 2017, 2019, 2022, 2023, 2024
Kantō Soccer League Div.1	2	2014, 2015
Shakaijin Cup	1	2022
Japanese Regional Football Champions League	1	2022

== Current squad ==
As of 23 July 2024

Note: Flags indicate national team as defined under FIFA eligibility rules; some limited exceptions apply. Players may hold more than one non-FIFA nationality.

No.	Pos.	Nation	Player
1	GK	JPN	Yuki Motoyoshi
2	MF	JPN	Kenta Murakoshi
3	DF	JPN	Shion Kurita
4	DF	JPN	Yuya Fujioka
5	DF	JPN	Takefumi Yoshita
6	MF	JPN	Kouhei Kikuchi
7	FW	JPN	Yushi Akiba (captain)
8	MF	JPN	Shun Tomizuka
9	MF	JPN	Ryosuke Iizawa
10	FW	JPN	Hayato Mine
11	FW	JPN	Shun Higashi
13	MF	JPN	Kouki Wakasugi
14	MF	JPN	Yo Uematsu
15	DF	JPN	Kouki Matsuya
16	GK	JPN	Koichi Sakuma
17	MF	JPN	Ryoma Hashimoto
18	MF	JPN	Ryuta Fujimori
19	FW	JPN	Tsubasa Nihei

No.	Pos.	Nation	Player
20	MF	JPN	Aiki Shinotsuka
21	DF	JPN	Kazuki Terada
22	DF	JPN	Tomita Hidetoshi
23	MF	JPN	Takuya Iwade
24	FW	JPN	Yohei Hayashi
25	GK	JPN	Yushin Amano
26	DF	JPN	Tetta Kasashima
27	DF	JPN	Ko Shimura (on loan from Matsumoto Yamaga)
28	MF	JPN	Junya Ito
30	FW	JPN	Shotaro Inoue
31	MF	JPN	Futoshi Arai
32	DF	JPN	Shuri Toyoshima
34	FW	JPN	Kanato Abe
35	GK	JPN	Teruki Matsuno
37	DF	JPN	Takeru Osada
39	DF	JPN	Koudai Yamazaki
40	DF	JPN	Ryota Tominaga

== Club staff ==
Position	Name
Manager and Development advisor	(Japan) Satoshi Tsunami
First-team coach	(Japan) Yohei Oniki
Coach and Analyst	(Japan) Masaki Hayakawa
Goalkeeper coach	(Japan) Koichi Sakuma
Physical coach	(Japan) Yushi Akiba
Competent	(Japan) Motoyasu Suzuki
Trainer	(Japan) Naoshi Matsumoto (Japan) Ryo Takeda
Club manager	(Japan) Tomohiro Ishishita
Strengthening department manager	(Japan) Takanori Asada
Public relations manager	(Japan) Shuta Odajima
Striker coach	(Japan) Taro Hasegawa
Side affairs	(Japan) Masahiro Matsumoto

== Managerial history ==
Manager	Nationality	Tenure	
Manager	Nationality	Start	Finish
Yoshiyuki Saito	Japan	1 February 2011	25 June 2017
Kei Shibata	Japan	1 July 2017	12 November 2017
Masashi Hachuda	Japan	1 February 2018	30 September 2018
Tomohiko Suzui	Japan	1 October 2018	31 January 2019
Satoshi Tsunami	Japan	1 February 2019	present

== Kit evolution ==
Home kit
2018-2019

Away kit
2018-2019
