= Yuichiro Edamoto =

Japanese footballer

Yuichiro Edamoto 枝本雄一郎
Personal information
- Full name: Yuichiro Edamoto
- Date of birth: August 6, 1988 (age 38)
- Place of birth: Fujisawa, Kanagawa, Japan
- Height: 1.66 m (5 ft 5 1/2 in)
- Position: Midfielder

Team information
- Current team: Kagoshima United FC
- Number: 16

Youth career
- 2011–2012: Thespa Kusatsu U-23

Senior career*
Years	Team	Apps	(Gls)
2013	Thespakusatsu Gunma	0	(0)
2014–2017	Fujieda MYFC	119	(30)
2018	FC Ryukyu	31	(7)
2019–2020	Kagoshima United FC	55	(4)
2021–	Fujieda MYFC		
- * Club domestic league appearances and goals as of 5 January 2021

Yuichiro Edamoto (枝本雄一郎, Edamoto, Yuichiro; born August 6, 1988) is a Japanese football player, who plays for Kagoshima United FC as a midfielder.

== Career ==
After attending Kindai University, Edamoto signed for Thespakusatsu Gunma, where he played first for the U-23 side, and then went to their first squad.

In January 2014, he decided to move to Fujieda MYFC.

== Club statistics ==
Updated to 5 January 2021.

Club performance			League		Cup		Total	
Season	Club	League	Apps	Goals	Apps	Goals	Apps	Goals
Japan			League		Emperor's Cup		Total	
2013	Thespakusatsu Gunma	J2 League	0	0	0	0	0	0
2014	Fujieda MYFC	J3 League	24	3	2	0	26	3
2015	Fujieda MYFC	J3 League	35	2	3	2	38	4
2016	Fujieda MYFC	J3 League	30	12	–		30	12
2017	Fujieda MYFC	J3 League	30	13	–		30	13
2018	FC Ryukyu	J3 League	31	7	1	0	32	7
2019	Kagoshima United FC	J2 League	31	2	1	0	32	2
2020	Kagoshima United FC	J3 League	24	2	–		24	2
Total			205	41	7	2	212	43
