= Shuto Kammera =

Japanese footballer

Personal information
- Date of birth: 2 July 1996 (age 30)
- Place of birth: Sagamihara, Kanagawa, Japan
- Height: 1.67 m (5 ft 6 in)
- Position: Midfielder

Team information
- Current team: Veroskronos Tsuno
- Number: 13

Youth career
- –2008: Kamimizo FC
- 2009–2011: Kamimizo Junior High School
- 2012–2014: Shonan Inst. of Tech. High School

College career
Years	Team	Apps	(Gls)
2015–2018	Niigata University of H&W		

Senior career*
Years	Team	Apps	(Gls)
2019–2020	SC Sagamihara	37	(5)
2020–	Nagano Parceiro	6	(1)
- * Club domestic league appearances and goals as of 10 November 2020

Shuto Kammera (上米良 柊人, Kammera Shuto; born 2 July 1996) is a Japanese footballer currently playing as a forward for Veroskronos Tsuno.

== Career statistics ==
=== Club ===
As of 10 November 2020.

Club	Season	League			Cup		League Cup		Total	
Club	Season	Division	Apps	Goals	Apps	Goals	Apps	Goals	Apps	Goals
SC Sagamihara	2019	J3 League	32	5	0	0	–		32	5
SC Sagamihara	2020	J3 League	5	0	0	0	–		5	0
SC Sagamihara	Total		37	5	0	0	0	0	37	5
Nagano Parceiro	2020	J3 League	6	1	0	0	–		6	1
Career total			43	6	0	0	0	0	43	6
