= 2022 Japanese Regional Leagues =

Japanese amateur leagues football season

Japanese Regional Leagues
- Season: 2022
- Promoted: Briobecca Urayasu; Okinawa SV

The 2022 Japanese Regional Leagues (Japanese: 2022 地域リーグ, Hepburn: 2022 Chiiki Rīgu) was the 57th edition of the Japanese Regional Leagues, the fifth tier of the Japanese football league system. As usual, this edition of the Regional Leagues was divided with 84 teams distributed in nine regional leagues. The winners of the first division of each Regional League along with other three between the nine Regional Leagues runners-up (determined by criteria set by the JFA), qualified for the 2022 Japanese Regional Football Champions League. It served as a single-elimination tournament, in which the winner and the runner-up of the competition can also qualify either directly for the Japan Football League (JFL), or by a play-off match with one of the last-placed teams at the JFL table, with the confirmation of how must the winner (and/or runner-up) get promoted to the JFL being made by the league board.

== Champions list ==
Region	Champions
Hokkaido	BTOP Thank Kuriyama
Tohoku	Cobaltore Onagawa
Kantō	Tochigi City
Hokushin'etsu	Artista Asama
Tōkai	FC Kariya
Kansai	Arterivo Wakayama
Chūgoku	Fukuyama City
Shikoku	FC Tokushima
Kyushu	Okinawa SV

== Regional League Standings ==
=== Hokkaido ===
Pos	Team	Pld	W	D	L	GF	GA	GD	Pts	Qualification or relegation
1	BTOP Thank Kuriyama	14	11	3	0	60	3	+57	36	Qualification for the 2022 Regional Champions League
2	Hokkaido Tokachi Sky Earth	14	10	2	2	53	6	+47	32	
3	Norbritz Hokkaido	14	8	3	3	31	14	+17	27	
4	Sapporo FC	14	4	3	7	18	29	−11	15	
5	Hokusyukai Iwamizawa	14	5	0	9	24	51	−27	15	
6	Sapporo University Goal Plunderers	14	3	3	8	16	40	−24	12	
7	Nippon Steel Muroran	14	3	2	9	16	40	−24	11	Relegated to Hokkaido Block Leagues
8	ASC Hokkaido	14	3	2	9	14	49	−35	11	Relegated to Hokkaido Block Leagues

Source: Hokkaido FA
Rules for classification: 1) Points; 2) Goal difference; 3) Goals scored

=== Tohoku ===
For the 2022 season, league matches will be held according to the following guidelines:

The season is divided in two phases, each club plays 1 game against every other team. After the first phase of matches, by which all clubs will have played eleven games, the league splits into two halves – a 'top six section' and a 'bottom six section'. Each club plays a further five matches, one against each of the other five teams in their own section. Points achieved during the first phase of 11 matches are carried forward to the second phase, but the teams compete only within their own sections during the second phase. After the first phase is completed, clubs cannot move out of their own half in the league, even if they achieve more or fewer points than a higher or lower ranked team, respectively. The second division will determine the final standings in both the North-South Leagues with a round-robin league campaign.
Dogizaka FC changed its name to Bogolle.D.Tsugaru FC prior to the start of the season.

Division 1
Pos	Team	Pld	W	D	L	GF	GA	GD	Pts	Qualification or relegation
1	Cobaltore Onagawa	16	15	0	1	71	8	+63	45	Qualification for the 2022 Regional Champions League
2	Blancdieu Hirosaki	16	12	2	2	73	10	+63	38	
3	Sendai University	16	11	2	3	63	18	+45	35	
4	Shichigahama SC	16	9	2	5	32	29	+3	29	
5	Morioka Zebra	16	6	2	8	24	64	−40	20	
6	Fuji Club 2003	16	4	4	8	22	26	−4	16	
7	Ganju Iwate	16	8	3	5	32	17	+15	27	
8	Nippon Steel Kamaishi	16	5	4	7	24	29	−5	19	
9	Bogolle D. Tsugaru	16	5	4	7	27	48	−21	19	Relegation to Division 2
10	FC Primeiro Fukushima	16	5	2	9	30	38	−8	17	Relegation to Division 2
11	Saruta Kogyo	16	1	1	14	15	73	−58	4	Relegation to Division 2
12	Omiya SC	16	1	2	13	12	65	−53	5	Relegation to Division 2

Source: Tohoku FA
Rules for classification: 1) Points; 2) Goal difference; 3) Goals scored

Division 2 North
Pos	Team	Pld	W	D	L	GF	GA	GD	Pts	Qualification or relegation
1	Oshu United FC	8	6	2	0	32	3	+29	20	Promotion to Division 1
2	Akita FC Cambiare	8	6	1	1	31	8	+23	19	
3	TDK Shinwakai	8	5	1	2	27	11	+16	16	
4	Kuzumaki Club	8	5	1	2	18	14	+4	16	
5	Lascivo Aomori	8	4	0	4	15	15	0	12	
6	Hokuto Bank SC	8	3	1	4	19	24	−5	10	
7	NewPearl Hiraizumi Maesawa	8	2	1	5	14	24	−10	7	
8	Tono Club	8	1	1	6	8	27	−19	4	Relegation to Prefectural Leagues
9	Gonohe FC	8	0	0	8	1	39	−38	0	Relegation to Prefectural Leagues

Source: Tohoku FA
Rules for classification: 1) Points; 2) Goal difference; 3) Goals scored

Division 2 South
Pos	Team	Pld	W	D	L	GF	GA	GD	Pts	Promotion or relegation
1	FC La Universidad de Sendai	12	12	0	0	59	7	+52	36	Promotion to Division 1
2	ARDORE Kuwahara	12	8	2	2	38	15	+23	26	
3	Merry	12	8	2	2	29	18	+11	26	
4	Iwaki Furukawa FC	12	8	1	3	47	18	+29	25	
5	Sendai SASUKE FC	12	7	3	2	48	22	+26	24	
6	Oyama SC	12	6	1	5	39	16	+23	19	
7	RICOH Industry Tohoku	12	5	4	3	30	20	+10	19	
8	Nagai Club	12	4	2	6	30	29	+1	14	
9	FC Parafrente Yonezawa	12	3	3	6	15	41	−26	12	
10	Soma SC	12	3	0	9	18	49	−31	9	Relegation to Prefectural Leagues
11	Mikawa SC	12	2	2	8	24	35	−11	8	Relegation to Prefectural Leagues
12	F.F.C Matsushita	12	1	2	9	7	56	−49	5	Relegation to Prefectural Leagues
13	Sentai Nakata SC	12	0	0	12	6	64	−58	0	Relegation to Prefectural Leagues

Source: Tohoku FA
Rules for classification: 1) Points; 2) Goal difference; 3) Goals scored

=== Kantō ===
Division 1
Pos	Team	Pld	W	D	L	GF	GA	GD	Pts	Qualification or relegation
1	Tochigi City	18	11	4	3	33	14	+19	37	Qualification for the 2022 Regional Champions League
2	Tokyo United	18	11	2	5	35	20	+15	35	
3	Tokyo 23	18	10	2	6	30	23	+7	32	
4	Vonds Ichihara	18	8	5	5	22	20	+2	29	
5	Joyful Honda Tsukuba	18	6	4	8	19	28	−9	22	
6	Briobecca Urayasu (P)	18	5	6	7	25	23	+2	21	Qualification for the 2022 Regional Champions League; Promoted for the 2023 Japan Football League (Note: Qualified as one of the 4 best-placed teams of the 2022 Shakaijin Cup)
7	Nankatsu SC	18	4	7	7	16	22	−6	19	
8	Toho Titanium	18	4	6	8	15	22	−7	18	
9	RKU Dragons	18	4	6	8	21	29	−8	18	
10	Esperanza SC	18	3	6	9	13	28	−15	15	Relegation to Division 2

Source: GoalNote
Rules for classification: 1) Points; 2) Goal difference; 3) Goals scored
(P) Promoted

Division 2
Pos	Team	Pld	W	D	L	GF	GA	GD	Pts	Qualification or relegation
1	Toin University of Yokohama	18	13	4	1	21	5	+16	43	Promotion to 1st Division
2	Tokyo International University	18	10	4	4	38	19	+19	34	Promotion to 1st Division
3	Tonan Maebashi	18	9	7	2	25	13	+12	34	
4	Aries Tokyo	18	7	4	7	21	22	−1	25	
5	Yokohama Takeru	18	7	2	9	15	28	−13	23	
6	Hitachi Building System SC	18	6	4	8	16	20	−4	22	
7	Identy Mirai	18	6	3	9	21	24	−3	21	
8	Aventura Kawaguchi	18	5	2	11	17	22	−5	17	
9	Vertfee Yaita	18	3	7	8	16	23	−7	16	
10	Ryutsu Keizai University FC	18	3	5	10	19	33	−14	14	Relegation to Prefectural Leagues

Updated to match(es) played on 1 October 2022. Source: GoalNote

=== Hokushin'etsu ===
Division 1
Pos	Team	Pld	W	D	L	GF	GA	GD	Pts	Qualification or relegation
1	Artista Asama	14	9	4	1	36	12	+24	31	Qualification for the 2022 Regional Champions League
2	Japan Soccer College	14	8	5	1	30	9	+21	29	
3	Fukui United	14	9	1	4	38	16	+22	28	
4	Niigata University of Health & Welfare FC	14	8	1	5	29	20	+9	25	
5	Toyama Shinjo	14	6	5	3	18	13	+5	23	
6	05' Kamo	14	3	2	9	15	26	−11	11	
7	Sakai Phoenix	14	3	2	9	14	30	−16	11	Relegation to Division 2
8	Libertas Chikuma	14	0	0	14	6	60	−54	0	Relegation to Division 2

Source: GoalNote
Rules for classification: 1) Points; 2) Goal difference; 3) Goals scored

Division 2
Pos	Team	Pld	W	D	L	GF	GA	GD	Pts	Qualification or relegation
1	FC Hokuriku	14	9	0	5	32	19	+13	27	Promotion to Division 1
2	FC Antelope Shiojiri	14	7	3	4	26	19	+7	24	Promotion to Division 1
3	N Style Toyama	14	6	5	3	25	17	+8	23	
4	FC Matsucelona	14	7	2	5	27	30	−3	23	
5	SR Komatsu	14	4	6	4	23	18	+5	18	
6	CUPS Seiro	14	4	4	6	16	20	−4	16	
7	Granscena Niigata	14	3	5	6	21	31	−10	14	Relegation to Prefectural Leagues
8	'09 Keidai FC	14	2	3	9	12	28	−16	9	Relegation to Prefectural Leagues

Updated to match(es) played on 1 October 2022. Source: GoalNote

=== Tōkai ===
Division 1
Pos	Team	Pld	W	D	L	GF	GA	GD	Pts	Qualification or relegation
1	FC Kariya	16	11	3	2	39	11	+28	36	Qualification for the 2022 Regional Champions League
2	Fujieda City Hall	16	10	3	3	35	22	+13	33	
3	FC Ise-Shima	16	9	4	3	26	16	+10	31	
4	Chukyo University	16	8	5	3	29	11	+18	29	
5	Yazaki Valente	16	5	3	8	17	26	−9	18	
6	Tokai Gakuen University	16	4	4	8	27	36	−9	16	
7	Chukyo Univ. FC	16	4	3	9	25	35	−10	15	Relegated to Division 2
8	Tokoha University	16	4	3	9	21	39	−18	15	Relegated to Division 2
9	Toyota Shukyudan	16	2	2	12	19	42	−23	8	Relegated to Division 2

Source: Tokai SL
Rules for classification: 1) Points; 2) Goal difference; 3) Goals scored

Division 2
Pos	Team	Pld	W	D	L	GF	GA	GD	Pts	Qualification or relegation
1	Wyvern FC	16	15	1	0	85	6	+79	46	Promotion to Division 1
2	FC Gifu Second	16	11	1	4	37	26	+11	34	Promotion to Division 1
3	FC Bombonera	16	10	1	5	38	20	+18	31	
4	AS Kariya	16	7	1	8	23	36	−13	22	
5	Nagoya SC	15	5	4	6	24	19	+5	19	
6	Nagara Club	14	5	1	8	18	32	−14	16	
7	Yokkaichi University	15	4	2	9	19	48	−29	14	Relegated to Prefectural Leagues
8	Rivielta Toyokawa	16	4	1	11	23	48	−25	13	Relegated to Prefectural Leagues
9	FC Ogaki Kogans	16	2	2	12	11	43	−32	8	Relegated to Prefectural Leagues

Updated to match(es) played on 19 November 2022. Source: Tokai SL

=== Kansai ===
==== Division 1 ====
Pos	Team	Pld	W	D	L	GF	GA	GD	Pts	Qualification or relegation
1	Arterivo Wakayama	14	9	2	3	24	11	+13	29	Qualification for the 2022 Regional Champions League
2	Asuka FC	14	9	0	5	16	11	+5	27	
3	Cento Cuore Harima	14	6	6	2	12	10	+2	24	
4	Ococias Kyoto	14	6	4	4	18	11	+7	22	
5	Lagend Shiga	14	6	1	7	21	16	+5	19	
6	Moriyama Samurai 2000	14	6	1	7	21	22	−1	19	
7	AS Laranja Kyoto	14	5	3	6	18	21	−3	18	Relegated to Division 2
8	FC AWJ	14	0	1	13	5	33	−28	1	Relegated to Division 2

Source: GoalNote
Rules for classification: 1) Points; 2) Goal difference; 3) Goals scored

==== Division 2 ====
This is the 18th edition of the Kansai Football League Division 2

Pos	Team	Pld	W	D	L	GF	GA	GD	Pts	Qualification or relegation
1	FC Easy 02 Akashi	18	15	0	3	63	18	+45	45	Promotion to Division 1
2	Kansai FC 2008	18	12	2	4	51	15	+36	38	Promotion to Division 1
3	Hannan University SC	18	11	2	5	41	20	+21	35	
4	St. Andrew's FC	18	10	1	7	34	23	+11	31	
5	Kobe FC 1970	18	7	4	7	21	26	−5	25	
6	Takasago Mineiro FC	18	6	4	8	18	32	−14	22	
7	Kyoto Shiko SC	18	5	4	9	20	31	−11	19	
8	Kandai Club 2010	18	5	4	9	24	40	−16	19	Relegated to Prefectural Leagues
9	FC Eveil	18	5	3	10	15	33	−18	18	Relegated to Prefectural Leagues
10	Dios 1995	18	1	2	15	14	63	−49	5	Relegated to Prefectural Leagues

Source: GoalNote
Rules for classification: 1) Points; 2) Goal difference; 3) Goals scored

=== Chūgoku ===
Pos	Team	Pld	W	D	L	GF	GA	GD	Pts	Qualification or relegation
1	Fukuyama City	18	15	2	1	60	10	+50	47	Qualification for the 2022 Regional Champions League
2	Baleine Shimonoseki	18	14	0	4	41	22	+19	42	
3	Belugarosso Hamada	18	10	4	4	43	19	+24	34	
4	SRC Hiroshima	18	8	6	4	43	20	+23	30	
5	Mitsubishi Motors Mizushima	18	7	7	4	41	16	+25	28	
6	International Pacific University FC	18	7	3	8	30	21	+9	24	
7	NTN Okayama	18	6	1	11	18	62	−44	19	
8	Yonago Genki	18	3	6	9	15	34	−19	15	
9	Fujifilm BIJ Hiroshima	18	2	3	13	12	51	−39	9	Relegation to Prefectural Leagues
10	SC Matsue	18	1	2	15	6	54	−48	5	Relegation to Prefectural Leagues

Source: Chugoku SL and Baleine S'ki Website
Rules for classification: 1) Points; 2) Goal difference; 3) Goals scored

=== Shikoku ===
Pos	Team	Pld	W	D	L	GF	GA	GD	Pts	Qualification or relegation
1	FC Tokushima	14	13	1	0	66	8	+58	40	Qualification for the 2022 Regional Champions League
2	Lvnirosso SC	14	10	3	1	47	19	+28	33	
3	KUFC Nankoku	14	8	3	3	30	16	+14	27	
4	Llamas Kochi	14	6	3	5	21	26	−5	21	
5	Tadotsu FC	14	4	3	7	23	32	−9	15	
6	Nakamura Club	14	5	0	9	12	35	−23	15	
7	R.Velho Takamatsu	14	3	0	11	11	35	−24	9	
8	FC Yanagimachi	14	0	1	13	7	46	−39	1	Relegation to Prefectural Leagues

Source: GoalNote
Rules for classification: 1) Points; 2) Goal difference; 3) Goals scored

=== Kyushu ===
Pos	Team	Pld	W	D	L	GF	GA	GD	Pts	Qualification or relegation
1	Okinawa SV (P)	20	19	1	0	75	5	+70	58	Qualification for the 2022 Regional Champions League; Promoted for the 2023 Japan Football League
2	Nobeoka Agata	20	15	2	3	68	10	+58	47	Qualification for the 2022 Regional Champions League (Note: Qualified as one of the 4 best-placed teams of the 2022 Shakaijin Cup)
3	Veroskronos Tsuno	20	15	2	3	65	10	+55	47	Qualification for the 2022 Regional Champions League
4	J-Lease FC	20	13	2	5	45	17	+28	41	
5	NIFS Kanoya	20	9	2	9	38	51	−13	29	
6	Brew Kashima	20	8	2	10	28	55	−27	26	
7	KMG Holdings	20	7	3	10	41	50	−9	24	
8	Nippon Steel Oita SC	20	4	5	11	24	38	−14	17	
9	Kawasoe Club	20	5	2	13	16	57	−41	17	
10	Kumamoto Teachers	20	2	1	17	11	72	−61	7	Relegation to Prefectural Leagues
11	Kaiho Bank	20	1	2	17	15	61	−46	5	Relegation to Prefectural Leagues

Source: Football Score System
Rules for classification: 1) Points; 2) Goal difference; 3) Goals scored
(P) Promoted
