= 2025 Kyoto Sanga FC season =

Kyoto Sanga
2025 season
- Manager: Cho Kwi-jae
- Stadium: Sanga Stadium by Kyocera
- J1 League: 2nd
- Emperor's Cup: Second round
- J.League Cup: Third round
- Top goalscorer: League: Rafael Elias (8); All: Rafael Elias (9)
- Average home league attendance: 16,538
- Biggest win: Kyoto Sanga 3–0 FC Tokyo
- Biggest defeat: Kyoto Sanga 1–4 Cerezo Osaka

The 2025 season is the 93rd year in the history of Kyoto Sanga FC and the club’s fourth consecutive season in the J1 League. In addition, Kyoto Sanga FC is participating in the Emperor's Cup and the J. League Cup.

== Transfers ==
=== In ===
Position	Player	From	Fee	Date	Ref
MF	(Brazil) João Pedro	(Brazil) Vitória	Loan	5 January 2025	
FW	(Japan) Shun Nagasawa	(Japan) Oita Trinita	Free	20 January 2025	

== Competitions ==
=== Overall record ===
Competition	First match	Last match	Starting round	Final position	Record							
Competition	First match	Last match	Starting round	Final position	Pld	W	D	L	GF	GA	GD	Win %
J1 League	15 February 2025	6 December 2025	Matchday 1		20	10	4	6	30	22	+8	50.00
J.League Cup	20 March 2025	21 May 2025	First round	Third round	3	2	0	1	4	4	+0	66.67
Total					23	12	4	7	34	26	+8	52.17

Last updated: 31 May 2025
Source: Competitions

=== J1 League ===
==== Results summary ====
Overall								Home						Away					
Pld	W	D	L	GF	GA	GD	Pts	W	D	L	GF	GA	GD	W	D	L	GF	GA	GD
20	10	4	6	30	22	+8	34	4	3	2	13	8	+5	6	1	4	17	14	+3

Last updated: 31 May 2025.

==== Results by round ====
Round	1	2	3	4	5	6	7	8	9	10	11	12	13	14	15	16	17	18	19
Ground	A	H	A	A	H	A	H	H	A	H	A	H	A	H	A	H	A	A	H
Result	L	D	D	W	L	W	W	D	W	W	W	W	L	L	W	D	W	L	W
Position																			

Updated to match(es) played on 31 May 2025. Source:
A = Away; H = Home; W = Win; D = Draw; L = Loss

==== Matches ====
15 February 2025 1	Fagiano Okayama	2–0	Kyoto Sanga	Okayama
13:00 JST	Kimura 23' 36'; Lucão (yellow card) 48'	Report	Rafael Elias (yellow card) 64'; Patrick William (yellow card) 90+2'	Stadium: JFE Harenokuni Stadium; Attendance: 14,575; Referee: (Japan) Takafumi Mikuriya

22 February 2025 2	Kyoto Sanga	1–1	Urawa Red Diamonds	Kameoka
13:00 JST	Rafael Elias 60'	Report	Thiago Santana 73'	Stadium: Sanga Stadium by Kyocera; Attendance: 14,718; Referee: (Japan) Takuto Okabe

26 February 2025 3	Vissel Kobe	1–1	Kyoto Sanga	Kobe
18:00 JST	Iwanami (yellow card) 82'; Sasaki 90+11'	Report	Patrick William (yellow card) 7'; Marco Túlio 13'	Stadium: Noevir Stadium Kobe; Attendance: 11,335; Referee: (Japan) Koei Koya

1 March 2025 4	Kawasaki Frontale	0–1	Kyoto Sanga	Kawasaki
14:00 JST		Report	João Pedro (yellow card) 24'; Okugawa 49'; Yonemoto (yellow card) 78'; Fukuoka (yellow card) 90'	Stadium: Uvance Todoroki Stadium by Fujitsu; Attendance: 22,404; Referee: (Japan) Yudai Yamamoto

9 March 2025 5	Kyoto Sanga	0–1	Avispa Fukuoka	Kameoka
13:00 JST	Rafael Elias (yellow card) 21'	Report	Konno 65'	Stadium: Sanga Stadium by Kyocera; Attendance: 11,535; Referee: (Japan) Yoshiro Imamura

16 March 2025 6	Shimizu S-Pulse	1–2	Kyoto Sanga	Shizuoka
12:00 JST	Kitagawa 82' (pen.)	Report	Rafael Elias 38' (pen.); Sato (yellow card) 60'; João Pedro 67' (yellow card) 90'; Kawasaki (yellow card) 90+2'	Stadium: IAI Stadium Nihondaira; Attendance: 14,012; Referee: (Japan) Takafumi Mikuriya

29 March 2025 7	Kyoto Sanga	1–0	Sanfrecce Hiroshima	Kameoka
13:00 JST	Rafael Elias 60'	Report		Stadium: Sanga Stadium by Kyocera; Attendance: 14,393; Referee: (Japan) Yoshimi Yamashita

2 April 2025 8	Kyoto Sanga	1–1	Kashiwa Reysol

6 April 2025 9	Kashima Antlers	3–4	Kyoto Sanga

12 April 2025 10	Kyoto Sanga	2–0	Shonan Bellmare

19 April 2025 11	Albirex Niigata	1–2	Kyoto Sanga

25 April 2025 12	Kyoto Sanga	2–1	Yokohama FC

29 April 2025 13	Gamba Osaka	2–1	Kyoto Sanga

3 May 2025 14	Kyoto Sanga	2–3	Cerezo Osaka

7 May 2025 15	Machida Zelvia	1–2	Kyoto Sanga

11 May 2025 16	Kyoto Sanga	1–1	Nagoya Grampus

17 May 2025 17	Yokohama F. Marinos	0–3	Kyoto Sanga

25 May 2025 18	Tokyo Verdy	1–0	Kyoto Sanga	Chōfu
15:00 UTC+9	Arai 90+4'		Takeda (yellow card) 19'; Sato (yellow card) 35'; Hirato (red card) 67'	Stadium: Ajinomoto Stadium; Referee: Hiroki Kasahara

31 May 2025 19	Kyoto Sanga	3–0	FC Tokyo	Kameoka
19:00 UTC+9	Kawasaki 32'; Takeda 70'; Okugawa 75'			Stadium: Sanga Stadium by Kyocera

=== Emperor's Cup ===
11 June 2025 Second round	Kyoto Sanga	v	Nara Club	Kameoka
19:00				Stadium: Sanga Stadium by Kyocera

=== J.League Cup ===
20 March 2025 First round	Gainare Tottori	0–2	Kyoto Sanga	Tottori
13:00 JST	Taichi Matsumoto (yellow card) 71'	Report	Ryuma Nakano 18'; Rafael Elias 71'; Kawasaki (yellow card) 74'; Cho Kwi-jae (yellow card) 75'	Stadium: Axis Bird Stadium; Attendance: 3,166; Referee: (Japan) Akihiko Ikeuchi

9 April 2025 Second round	Montedio Yamagata	0–1	Kyoto Sanga	Yamagata
19:00 JST	Mikeltadze (yellow card) 75'	Report	Kodai Nagata 45+1' (yellow card) 61'; Matsuda (yellow card) 73'	Stadium: ND Soft Stadium Yamagata; Attendance: 3,701; Referee: (Japan) Yoshiro Imamura

21 May 2025 Third round	Kyoto Sanga	1–4	Cerezo Osaka	Kameoka
	Murilo Costa 10'; Fukuoka (yellow card) 38'; Túlio (red card) 90+4'		Funaki (yellow card) 38', (goal) 48'; Thiago Andrade 61', 73'; Kim Jin-hyeon (yellow card) 65'; Rafael Ratão 81', (yellow card) 90'	Stadium: Sanga Stadium by Kyocera; Attendance: 6,233; Referee: Florian Badstübner (Germany)

== Statistics ==
=== Goalscorers ===
Position	Player	J1 League	Emperor's Cup	J.League Cup	Total
FW	(Brazil) Rafael Elias	8	0	1	9
MF	(Japan) Masaya Okugawa	6	0	0	6
MF	(Japan) Sota Kawasaki	3	0	0	3
FW	(Japan) Taichi Hara	2	0	0	2
MF	(Japan) Temma Matsuda	2	0	0	2
DF	(Japan) Shinnosuke Fukuda	1	0	0	1
FW	(Japan) Sora Hiraga	1	0	0	1
MF	(Brazil) João Pedro	1	0	0	1
FW	(Japan) Shun Nagasawa	1	0	0	1
FW	(Brazil) Marco Túlio	1	0	0	1
MF	(Japan) Takuji Yonemoto	1	0	0	1
MF	(Japan) Shohei Takeda	1	0	0	1
MF	(Brazil) Murilo Costa	0	0	1	1
DF	(Japan) Kodai Nagata	0	0	1	1
MF	(Japan) Ryuma Nakano	0	0	1	1
