= Tōkai Adult Soccer League =

Tōkai Soccer League
- Founded: 1966; 60 years ago
- Country: Japan
- Confederation: AFC
- Divisions: 2
- Number of clubs: Div 1: 8 Div 2: 8
- Level on pyramid: 5-6
- Promotion to: Japan Football League
- Relegation to: Prefectural Leagues
- Domestic cup: Emperor's Cup
- Current champions: Div 1: Gakunan F. Mosuperio; Div 2: Yazaki Valente (2025)
- Website: tokai-sl.jp
- Current: 2025 Japanese Regional Leagues

Tōkai Soccer League (東海サッカーリーグ, Tōkai Sakkā Rīgu) is the Japanese fifth tier of league football, which is part of the Japanese Regional Leagues. It covers most of the Tōkai region, as well as the prefectures of Aichi, Shizuoka, Gifu and Mie.

== 2026 clubs ==
=== Division 1 ===
#	Team	Hometown	Notes
1	Atletico Suzuka Club	Suzuka, Mie	Finished in 15th place in JFL and lost the playoff match and were relegated.
2	Chukyo University FC	Toyota, Aichi	
3	Fujieda City Hall SC	Fujieda, Shizuoka	
4	Gakunan F. Mosuperio (ja)	Gakunan, Shizuoka	
5	FC Ise-Shima	Shima, Mie	
6	FC Kariya	Kariya, Aichi	
7	Tokai FC (ja)	Nagoya & Yatomi City, Aichi	Promoted from Division 2 as runners-up
8	Yazaki Valente (ja)	Shimada, Shizuoka	Promoted from Division 2 as champions
9	Wyvern FC	Kariya, Aichi	

=== Division 2 ===
#	Team	Hometown	Notes
1	AS Kariya (ja)	Kariya, Aichi	Relegated in 8th place from Division 1
2	FC Bombonera (ja)	Seki, Gifu	Promoted (Tokai Adult Tournament, A Block Winner)
3	FC Gifu SECOND	Gifu, Gifu	
4	Rajil FC Higashimikawa (ja)	Toyokawa, Aichi	
5	Sports & Society Izu (ja)	Izu, Shizuoka	
6	Tokai Gakuen FC	Miyoshi, Aichi	
7	Vencedor Mie (ja)	Tsu City, Mie	Relegated in 7th place from Division 1
8	Voyagers (ja)	Tajimi, Gifu	Promoted (Tokai Adult Tournament, B Block Winner)

== Tōkai Adult Soccer League Champions ==
Edition	Year	Winner
1	1966	Toyota Motors (1)
2	1967	Nagoya Bank (1)
3	1968	Nippon Light Metal (1)
4	1969	Nippon Light Metal (2)
5	1970	Toyota Motors (2)
6	1971	Toyota Motors (3)
7	1972	Nagoya Club (1)
8	1973	Honda Motor Company (1)
9	1974	Honda Motor Company (2)
10	1975	Daikyo Oil (1)
11	1976	Nagoya Club (2)
12	1977	Yamaha Motor Company (1)
13	1978	Yamaha Motor Company (2)
14	1979	Nagoya Club (3)
15	1980	Fujieda City Hall (1)
16	1981	Daikyo Oil (2)
17	1982	Daikyo Oil (3)
18	1983	Daikyo Oil (4)
19	1984	Seino Transportation (1)
20	1985	Cosmo Oil Yokkaichi (5)
21	1986	Jatco SC (1)
22	1987	Jatco SC (2)
23	1988	Chuo Bohan SC (1)
24	1989	Seino Transportation (2)
25	1990	Seino Transportation (3)
26	1991	Seino Transportation (4)
27	1992	PJM Futures (1)
28	1993	Nippon Denso (1)
29	1994	Jatco SC (3)
30	1995	Nippon Denso (2)

Edition	Year	Winner
31	1996	Jatco SC (4)
32	1997	Hitachi Shimizu (1)
33	1998	Hitachi Shimizu (2)
34	1999	Hitachi Shimizu (3)
35	2000	Yazaki Valente (1)
36	2001	Fujieda City Hall (2)
37	2002	Shizuoka FC (1)
38	2003	Shizuoka FC (2)
39	2004	Yazaki Valente (2)
40	2005	Shizuoka FC (3)
41	2006	FC Gifu (1)
42	2007	Shizuoka FC (4)
43	2008	Shizuoka FC (5)
44	2009	Yazaki Valente (3)
45	2010	Fujieda MyFC (1)
46	2011	Fujieda MYFC (2)
47	2012	FC Suzuka Rampole (1)
48	2013	Maruyasu Industries (1)
49	2014	FC Suzuka Rampole (2)
50	2015	FC Kariya (3)
51	2016	FC Kariya (4)
52	2017	Suzuka Unlimited FC (3)
53	2018	Suzuka Unlimited FC (4)
54	2019	FC Kariya (5)
55	2020	FC Kariya (6)
56	2021	Fujieda City Hall (3)
57	2022	FC Kariya (7)
58	2023	Wyvern FC (1)
59	2024	FC Ise-Shima (1)
60	2025	Gakunan F. Mosuperio (ja) (1)
61	2026	
