= 2019 Prince Takamado U-18 Premier League =

Prince Takamado JFA U-18 Premier League for 2019

Prince Takamado JFA U-18 Premier League
- Season: 2019
- Dates: 6 April – 8 December
- Champions: Aomori Yamada (2nd title)
- Relegated: Kashima Antlers; Shoshi; Avispa Fukuoka; Ehime FC
- Matches played: 180
- Goals scored: 577 (3.21 per match)
- Top goalscorer: East: Hiryu Okuda (13 goals); West: Ryoma Ishii (13 goals)
- Biggest home win: East: Aomori Yamada 4–0 Shoshi (14 April); Aomori Yamada 4–0 Kashima Antlers (30 June); West: Gamba Osaka 8–0 Ehime FC (25 August)
- Biggest away win: East: Ichiritsu Funabashi 0–4 Aomori Yamada (8 December); West: Avispa Fukuoka 1–8 Gamba Osaka (1 September)
- Highest scoring: East: Kashiwa Reysol 7–4 RKU Kashiwa (11 April); West: Sanfrecce Hiroshima 4–5 Vissel Kobe (13 July); Avispa Fukuoka 1–8 Gamba Osaka (1 September)

The 2019 Prince Takamado JFA U-18 Football Premier League (Japanese: 高円宮杯 JFA U-18サッカープレミアリーグ 2019, Hepburn: Takamado no Miya-hai JFA U-18 Sakkā Puremia Rīgu 2019) was the 31st season of the main competition for under-18 teams in Japan and the 10th after rebranding the competition to the current "Premier League" format.

Aomori Yamada High School won the Premier League East, and Nagoya Grampus won the Premier League West. The teams' meeting in the final resulted with Aomori Yamada winning the competition for the second time.

== Changes from the previous season ==
Promoted from the Prince Leagues	Relegated to the Prince Leagues (East)	Relegated to the Prince Leagues (West)
Shoshi; Omiya Ardija; Ehime FC; Ohzu	FC Tokyo; Toyama Daiichi	Hannan; Yonago Kita

== Participating clubs ==
=== Premier League East ===
Team	Prefecture
Aomori Yamada High School	Aomori
Shoshi High School	Fukushima
Kashima Antlers	Ibaraki
Urawa Red Diamonds	Saitama
Omiya Ardija	Saitama
Ichiritsu Funabashi High School	Chiba
Kashiwa Reysol	Chiba
Ryutsu Keizai University Kashiwa High School	Chiba
Shimizu S-Pulse	Shizuoka
Júbilo Iwata	Shizuoka

=== Premier League West ===
Team	Prefecture
Nagoya Grampus	Aichi
Kyoto Sanga	Kyoto
Gamba Osaka	Osaka
Cerezo Osaka	Osaka
Vissel Kobe	Hyogo
Sanfrecce Hiroshima	Hiroshima
Ehime FC	Ehime
Avispa Fukuoka	Fukuoka
Higashi Fukuoka High School	Fukuoka
Ohzu High School	Kumamoto

== League table ==
=== Premier League East ===
Pos	Team	Pld	W	D	L	GF	GA	GD	Pts	Promotion or relegation
1	Aomori Yamada	18	11	4	3	42	20	+22	37	Qualification for Premier League final
2	Kashiwa Reysol	18	8	4	6	33	26	+7	28	
3	Urawa Red Diamonds	18	7	7	4	16	15	+1	28	
4	Shimizu S-Pulse	18	6	7	5	26	20	+6	25	
5	Ichiritsu Funabashi	18	7	3	8	20	25	−5	24	
6	Omiya Ardija	18	5	6	7	19	22	−3	21	
7	RKU Kashiwa	18	5	6	7	29	34	−5	21	
8	Júbilo Iwata	18	4	8	6	23	28	−5	20	
9	Kashima Antlers	18	5	5	8	18	23	−5	20	Relegation to the Prince Leagues
10	Shoshi	18	5	4	9	26	39	−13	19	Relegation to the Prince Leagues

Source: soccer-db.net
Rules for classification: 1) Points; 2) Goal difference; 3) Goals scored; 4) Head-to-head points; 5) Head-to-head goal difference; 6) Head-to-head goal scored; 7) Fair-play points.

=== Premier League West ===
Pos	Team	Pld	W	D	L	GF	GA	GD	Pts	Promotion or relegation
1	Nagoya Grampus	18	13	2	3	52	22	+30	41	Qualification for Premier League final
2	Kyoto Sanga	18	11	2	5	39	27	+12	35	
3	Gamba Osaka	18	10	4	4	47	22	+25	34	
4	Ohzu	18	9	3	6	25	26	−1	30	
5	Sanfrecce Hiroshima	18	9	2	7	38	26	+12	29	
6	Vissel Kobe	18	7	1	10	32	41	−9	22	
7	Cerezo Osaka	18	5	4	9	19	26	−7	19	
8	Higashi Fukuoka	18	6	1	11	24	40	−16	19	
9	Avispa Fukuoka	18	5	4	9	34	54	−20	19	Relegation to the Prince Leagues
10	Ehime FC	18	3	1	14	15	41	−26	10	Relegation to the Prince Leagues

Source: soccer-db.net
Rules for classification: 1) Points; 2) Goal difference; 3) Goals scored; 4) Head-to-head points; 5) Head-to-head goal difference; 6) Head-to-head goal scored; 7) Fair-play points.

== Promotion/relegation play-offs ==
As usual, the 16 top-ranked teams of the nine Prince League divisions entered the play-offs. They were split into four blocks, with each block winner (highlighted in bold) qualifying for the 2021 Premier League, as the 2020 edition was not held due to problems related to the COVID-19 outbreak.

=== Block A ===
13 December 1st round	FC Tokyo	**5–0**	Asahikawa Jitsugyo HS	Hiroshima
11:00	Kyota Tokiwa 28', 45+1'; Riku Kobayashi 43', 50'; Rio Omori 90+3'	Report		Stadium: Hiroshima Regional Park No.1 Ball Game Stadium; Attendance: 100; Referee: Taku Nagaya

13 December 1st round	Montedio Yamagata	**1–0** (a.e.t.)	Oita Trinita	Hiroshima
11:00	Kaisei Kano 109'	Report		Stadium: Hiroshima Regional Park Auxiliary Stadium; Attendance: 100; Referee: Takafumi Mikuriya

15 December 2nd round	**FC Tokyo**	**1–0**	Montedio Yamagata	Hiroshima
11:00	Riku Kobayashi 62'	Report		Stadium: Coca-Cola Bottlers Japan Hiroshima Stadium; Attendance: 385; Referee: Koki Nagamine

=== Block B ===
13 December 1st round	Teikyo Nagaoka HS	**1–4**	Yokohama F. Marinos	Hiroshima
11:00	Gakuto Yaoita 11'	Report	Hiroyasu Ishii 31', 33'; Eitaro Matsuda 39'; Noah Kenshin Browne 70'	Stadium: Coca-Cola Bottlers Japan Hiroshima Stadium; Attendance: 450; Referee: Yasuyuki Matsumoto

13 December 1st round	Hokkaido Consadole Sapporo	**1–0**	Yonago Kita HS	Hiroshima
11:00	Yohei Homma 57'	Report		Stadium: Edion Stadium Hiroshima; Attendance: 200; Referee: Shota Uchiyama

15 December 2nd round	**Yokohama F. Marinos**	**1–0**	Hokkaido Consadole Sapporo	Hiroshima
11:00	Keifu Kimura 44'	Report		Stadium: Hiroshima Regional Park No.1 Ball Game Stadium; Attendance: 550; Referee: Yusuke Ohashi

=== Block C ===
13 December 1st round	Sagan Tosu	**1–0**	Tokushima Vortis	Hiroshima
13:30	Fuchi Honda 51'	Report		Stadium: Hiroshima Regional Park No.1 Ball Game Stadium; Attendance: 100; Referee: Kohei Yano

13 December 1st round	Hannan University HS	**0–1**	Vegalta Sendai	Hiroshima
13:30		Report	Manato Kudo 89'	Stadium: Hiroshima Regional Park Auxiliary Stadium; Attendance: 100; Referee: Takuya Yokoyama

15 December 2nd round	**Sagan Tosu**	**2–1** (a.e.t.)	Vegalta Sendai	Hiroshima
13:30	Daiki Matsuoka 90+2'; Yuta Hideshima 93'	Report	Manato Kudo 53'	Stadium: Coca-Cola Bottlers Japan Hiroshima Stadium; Attendance: 500; Referee: Satoshi Michiyama

=== Block D ===
13 December 1st round	Okayama Gakugeikan HS	**0–4**	Yokohama FC	Hiroshima
13:30		Report	Tsubasa Sasaki 35', 78', 85'; Shuta Okumura 49'	Stadium: Edion Stadium Hiroshima; Attendance: 150; Referee: Masaki Kuniyoshi

13 December 1st round	JFA Academy Fukushima	**0–0** (a.e.t.) (**2–4** p)	Toyama Daiichi HS	Hiroshima
13:30		Report		Stadium: Coca-Cola Bottlers Japan Hiroshima Stadium; Attendance: 183; Referee: Daisuke Yamaguchi
	**Penalties**
	Hijiri Kato (penalty missed); Asahi Uenaka (penalty missed); Shunsuke Mito (penalty scored); Naoki Hashida (penalty scored)		(penalty scored) Toshiki Takagi; (penalty scored) Kota Sanada; (penalty scored) Shosei Usui; (penalty scored) Kanata Makino

15 December 2nd round	**Yokohama FC**	**2–1** (a.e.t.)	Toyama Daiichi HS	Hiroshima
13:30	Hikaru Miyahara 51'; Tsubasa Sasaki 94'	Report	Shosei Usui 89'	Stadium: Hiroshima Regional Park No.1 Football Stadium; Attendance: 500; Referee: Yuta Tashiro

== Final ==
15 December
13:00

Aomori Yamada	3–2	Nagoya Grampus
Shota Tanaka 12'; Kenta Goto 27'; Kuryu Matsuki 62'	Report	Yukito Murakami 41', 59'

Saitama Stadium 2002, Saitama
Attendance: 15,223
Referee: Toshihiro Nakai

GK	1	(Japan) Shibuki Sato
DF	2	(Japan) Yosuke Uchida
DF	3	(Japan) Yusei Kanda
DF	4	(Japan) Hiraku Hakozaki
DF	5	(Japan) Yudai Fujiwara
MF	6	(Japan) Riku Furuyado
MF	7	(Japan) Kuryu Matsuki
MF	8	(Japan) Rukia Urakawa	(substituted off) 59'
MF	10	(Japan) Hidetoshi Takeda (c)	(substituted off) 87'
MF	11	(Japan) Kenta Goto	(substituted off) 80'
FW	9	(Japan) Shota Tanaka	(substituted off) 87'
Substitutes:
GK	30	(Japan) Shonosuke Yamada
DF	16	(Japan) Ryusei Suzuki
MF	13	(Japan) Soki Tokuno	(substituted in) 80'
MF	14	(South Korea) Kim Hyeon-woo	(substituted in) 87'
MF	15	(Japan) Soma Anzai	(substituted in) 59'
MF	18	(Japan) Paul Tabinas
MF	24	(Japan) Shogo Matsumoto	(substituted in) 87'
Manager:
(Japan) Go Kuroda

GK	1	(Japan) John Higashi
DF	3	(Japan) Takeshi Ushizawa
DF	6	(Japan) Eiru Aratama
DF	15	(Japan) Seiga Sumi
MF	10	(Japan) Kohei Tanabe (c)
MF	18	(Japan) Shuto Mitsuda
MF	19	(Japan) Daichi Ichimaru	(substituted off) 80'
MF	25	(Japan) Yota Saito
FW	8	(Japan) Kyota Sakakibara
FW	11	(Japan) Yukito Murakami
FW	17	(Japan) Suiju Takeuchi	(substituted off) 52'
Substitutes:
GK	1	(Japan) Daiki Mitsui
DF	2	(Japan) Ryuya Okazaki	(substituted in) 80'
DF	20	(Japan) Shinma Ishikawa
MF	7	(Japan) Ken Masui	(substituted in) 52'
MF	29	(Japan) Gen Kato
FW	27	(Japan) Kosei Matsumoto
FW	36	(Japan) Hayato Manabe
Manager:
(Japan) Satoshi Koga

Assistant referees:
Seiichi Kanai
Soichi Iwasaki
Fourth official:
Masashi Harada

Match rules

- 90 minutes.
- Extra-time if scores still level at the end of regulation time.
- Penalty shoot-out if scores still level at the end of extra time.
- Seven named substitutes.
- Maximum of five substitutions during regulation time, with one more substition allowed if the match needs to go into extra-time.

== Top scorers ==
=== East ===
Rank	Player	Club	Goals
1	(Japan) Hiryu Okuda	Kashiwa Reysol	13
2	(Japan) Hidetoshi Takeda	Aomori Yamada	12
3	(Japan) Itsuki Someno	Shoshi	11
4	(Japan) Taichi Aoshima	Shimizu S-Pulse	9
4	(Japan) Itto Moriyama	RKU Kashiwa	9
6	(Japan) Mao Hosoya	Kashiwa Reysol	8
7	(Japan) Yusuke Onishi	RKU Kashiwa	7
8	(South Korea) Kim Hyun-woo	Aomori Yamada	8
8	(Japan) Shoichi Kurimata	Kashima Antlers	8
8	(Peru) Erick Noriega	Shimizu S-Pulse	8
8	(Japan) Yuito Suzuki	Ichiritsu Funabashi	8
8	(Japan) Shota Tanaka	Aomori Yamada	8

=== West ===
Rank	Player	Club	Goals
1	(Japan) Ryoma Ishii	Avispa Fukuoka	13
2	(Japan) Shun Ayukawa	Sanfrecce Hiroshima	11
3	(Japan) Yuto Otani	Gamba Osaka	10
3	(Japan) Shoji Toyama	Gamba Osaka	10
5	(Japan) Yukito Murakami	Nagoya Grampus	9
5	(Japan) Yoshiki Shigeno	Vissel Kobe	9
5	(Japan) Hayate Tanada	Sanfrecce Hiroshima	9
8	(Japan) Ryotaro Araki	Higashi Fukuoka	7
8	(Japan) Sota Kawasaki	Kyoto Sanga	7
8	(Japan) Shuto Mitsuda	Nagoya Grampus	7
8	(Japan) Suiju Takeuchi	Nagoya Grampus	7

== See also ==
- Japan Football Association (JFA)

League

- Japanese association football league system
- Prince Takamado Cup
