= 1967 Japanese Regional Leagues =

Japanese amateur leagues football season

Japanese Regional Leagues
- Season: 1967
- Champions: Urawa; Nagoya Bank; Osaka Sportsman Club
- Relegated: Tokyo Toyopet; Tokyo Gas; Mie Teachers; Shiga Club; Wakayama Club

Statistics of Japanese Regional Leagues for the 1967 season.

== Champions list ==
Region	Champions
Kantō	Urawa
Tōkai	Nagoya Bank
Kansai	Osaka Sportsman Club

== League standings ==
=== Kantō ===
The 1st Kantō Adult Soccer League (Shōwa)

Pos	Team	Pld	W	D	L	GF	GA	GD	Pts	
1	Urawa (C)	14	11	2	1	51	19	+32	24	
2	Fujitsu	14	9	0	5	33	13	+20	18	
3	Ibaraki Hitachi	14	7	4	3	29	18	+11	18	
4	Kofu	14	8	2	4	34	27	+7	18	
5	Toshiba	14	8	1	5	27	31	−4	17	
6	Sankyo	14	3	2	9	23	37	−14	8	
7	Tokyo Toyopet (R)	14	1	3	10	16	33	−17	5	Relegation to Tokyo Shakaijin Soccer League
8	Tokyo Gas (R)	14	2	0	12	21	56	−35	4	Relegation to Tokyo Shakaijin Soccer League

Source: Kanto Soccer League, RSSSF
Rules for classification: 1) points; 2) goal difference; 3) number of goals scored.
(C) Champions; (R) Relegated
- Kodama Club (Saitama), the champion of the Kanto Adult Soccer Tournament, and Gotenshita Club (Tokyo), who finished second, were promoted to the league for the following year (1968) after playing a replacement match with Tokyo Gas (Tokyo) and Tokyo Toyopet (Tokyo). (Replacement games were played until 1977)

=== Tōkai ===
This is the 2nd edition of the Tōkai Football League

Pos	Team	Pld	W	D	L	GF	GA	GD	Pts	
1	Nagoya Bank (C)	7	5	2	0	26	7	+19	12	
2	Toyota Motors	7	5	1	1	17	6	+11	11	
3	Nippon Light Metal	7	4	1	2	17	9	+8	9	
4	Nagoya	7	3	1	3	11	10	+1	7	
5	Domingo Club	7	3	0	4	13	22	−9	6	
6	Daikyo Oil	7	2	1	4	8	12	−4	5	
7	Wakaayu Club	7	1	2	4	5	12	−7	4	
8	Mie Teachers (R)	7	1	0	6	3	22	−19	2	Relegation to Mie Soccer League

Source: RSSSF
Rules for classification: 1) points; 2) goal difference; 3) number of goals scored.
(C) Champions; (R) Relegated

=== Kansai ===
This is the 2nd edition of the Kansai Football League.

Pos	Team	Pld	W	D	L	GF	GA	GD	Pts	
1	Osaka Sportsman Club (C)	7	7	0	0	21	5	+16	14	
2	Kyoto Shiko Club	7	4	1	2	17	7	+10	9	
3	Dainichi Nippon Cable	7	4	1	2	13	6	+7	9	
4	NTT Kinki	7	3	2	2	13	9	+4	8	
5	Fuji Steel Hirohata	7	3	1	3	18	10	+8	7	
6	Mitsubishi Motors Kyoto	7	2	2	3	11	14	−3	6	
7	Shiga Club (R)	7	1	0	6	10	27	−17	2	Relegation to Shiga Shakaijin Soccer League
8	Wakayama Club (R)	7	0	1	6	7	32	−25	1	Relegation to Wakayama Shakaijin Soccer League

Source: RSSSF
Rules for classification: 1) points; 2) goal difference; 3) number of goals scored.
(C) Champions; (R) Relegated
