= 1993 Japan Football League =

Japan Football League
- Season: 1993
- Champions: Fujita Industries
- Promoted: Fujita Industries; Júbilo Iwata
- Matches: 90
- Goals: 322 (3.58 per match)

Statistics of Japan Football League in the 1993 season.

== Division 1 ==
=== Clubs ===
The following ten clubs participated in Japan Football League Division 1 during the 1993 season.

- Fujieda Flux
- Fujita Industries
- Fujitsu
- Júbilo Iwata
- Kashiwa Reysol
- Kyoto Shiko Club
- Otsuka Pharmaceutical
- Tokyo Gas
- Toshiba
- Yanmar Diesel

=== Personnel ===
Club	Head coach
Fujieda Flux	(Japan) Yoshio Kikugawa
Fujita Industries	(Japan) Mitsuru Komaeda
Fujitsu	
Júbilo Iwata	(Japan) Kazuaki Nagasawa
Kashiwa Reysol	(Brazil) Zé Sérgio
Kyoto Shiko Club	
Otsuka Pharmaceutical	(Japan) Hajime Ishii
Tokyo Gas	(Japan) Toshiaki Imai
Toshiba	(Japan) Takeo Takahashi
Yanmar Diesel	(Japan) Daishiro Yoshimura

=== Foreign players ===
Club	Player 1	Player 2	Player 3	Player 4	Player 5	Non-visa foreign	Former players
Fujieda Flux	(Argentina) Nestor Omar Piccoli	(South Korea) Cho Min-kook					(Argentina) Raúl Maradona
Fujita Industries	(Brazil) Betinho	(Brazil) Edson	(Brazil) Mirandinha	(Brazil) Wilson Mano			
Fujitsu	(China) Gao Sheng						
Júbilo Iwata	(Brazil) Carlos Alberto	(Brazil) Vanderlei	(Brazil) Walter	(Netherlands) Gerald Vanenburg			
Kashiwa Reysol	(Brazil) Aílton Ferraz	(Brazil) Careca	(Brazil) Nelsinho	(Brazil) Renato	(Brazil) Wagner Lopes	(South Korea) Cho Kwi-jae	
Kyoto Shiko Club	(Uruguay) Mario López					(Brazil) Jair Masaoka	
Otsuka Pharmaceutical	(Brazil) Wagner	(China) Wang Baoshan					
Tokyo Gas	(Brazil) Amaral						
Toshiba	(Panama) Jorge Dely Valdés	(Uruguay) Pedro Pedrucci					
Yanmar Diesel							

=== Standings ===
Pos	Club	P	W	L	GF	GA	Notes
1	Fujita Industries	18	16	2	49	12	Promoted to J.League
2	Júbilo Iwata	18	14	4	31	15	Promoted to J.League
3	Toshiba	18	11	7	42	30	
4	Otsuka Pharmaceutical	18	10	8	33	39	
5	Kashiwa Reysol	18	9	9	41	24	
6	Fujitsu	18	8	10	27	37	
7	Yanmar Diesel	18	7	11	34	43	
8	Tokyo Gas	18	7	11	20	31	
9	Fujieda Flux	18	6	12	25	39	
10	Kyoto Shiko	18	2	16	20	52	

Source: RSSSF

== Division 2 ==
=== Clubs ===
The following ten clubs participated in Japan Football League Division 1 during the 1993 season.

- Cosmo Oil
- Honda
- Kawasaki Steel
- Kofu Club
- NKK
- NTT Kanto
- PJM Futures
- Seino Transportation
- Toho Titanium
- Toyota Motors Higashi-Fuji

=== Foreign players ===
Club	Player 1	Player 2	Non-visa foreign	Former players
Cosmo Oil	(South Korea) Kim Byung-soo			
Honda				
Kawasaki Steel				
Kofu Club				
NKK	(China) Duan Ju			
NTT Kanto				
PJM Futures	(Argentina) Hugo Maradona	(Argentina) Sergio Batista		
Seino Transportation				
Toho Titanium				
Toyota Motors Higashi-Fuji				

=== League standings ===
Pos	Club	P	W	L	GF	GA	Notes
1	Honda	18	15	3	62	21	
2	PJM Futures	18	15	3	46	9	
3	NKK	18	14	4	37	17	Folded
4	Cosmo Oil	18	11	7	30	26	
5	Kawasaki Steel	18	10	8	30	23	
6	Toyota Motors Higashi-Fuji	18	6	12	25	33	Folded
7	NTT Kanto	18	6	12	20	30	
8	Seino Transportation	18	6	12	20	42	To Promotion/Relegation Playoffs
9	Kofu Club	18	6	12	15	37	To Promotion/Relegation Playoffs
10	Toho Titanium	18	1	17	10	57	Relegated to Regional Leagues

Source: RSSSF

=== Promotion/Relegation Playoffs ===
==== Semifinals ====
JFL	Score	Regional Series
Seino Transportation	1–0	NEC Yamagata (runner-up)
Kofu Club	2–1	Nippon Denso SC (champions)

Seino Transportation and Kofu Club stay in the JFL.

==== Final ====
Loser 1	Score	Loser 2
NEC Yamagata	2–0	Nippon Denso SC

NEC Yamagata, now named as Montedio Yamagata, was promoted to the JFL next season.
