= 1966 Japanese Regional Leagues =

Japanese amateur leagues football season

Japanese Regional Leagues
- Season: 1966
- Champions: Toyota Motors; Osaka Sportsman Club
- Relegated: Tomoegawa Papers

Statistics of Japanese Regional Leagues in the 1966 season.

== Champions list ==
| Region | Champions |
|---|---|
| Tōkai | Toyota Motors |
| Kansai | Osaka Sportsman Club |

== League standings ==
=== Tōkai ===
This is the 1st edition of the Tōkai Football League

| Pos | Team | Pld | W | D | L | GF | GA | GD | Pts | |
|---|---|---|---|---|---|---|---|---|---|---|
| 1 | Toyota Motors (C) | 7 | 6 | 1 | 0 | 25 | 1 | +24 | 13 | |
| 2 | Nippon Light Metal | 7 | 6 | 0 | 1 | 29 | 3 | +26 | 12 | |
| 3 | Wakaayu Club | 7 | 5 | 0 | 2 | 20 | 5 | +15 | 10 | |
| 4 | Nagoya | 7 | 3 | 0 | 4 | 10 | 12 | −2 | 6 | |
| 5 | Domingo Club | 7 | 3 | 0 | 4 | 8 | 30 | −22 | 6 | |
| 6 | Mie Teachers | 7 | 2 | 0 | 5 | 7 | 22 | −15 | 4 | |
| 7 | Daikyo Oil | 7 | 1 | 1 | 5 | 7 | 21 | −14 | 3 | |
| 8 | Tomoegawa Papers (R) | 7 | 1 | 0 | 6 | 7 | 19 | −12 | 2 | Relegation to Prefectural League |

Source: RSSSF
Rules for classification: 1) points; 2) goal difference; 3) number of goals scored.
(C) Champions; (R) Relegated

=== Kansai ===
This is the 1st edition of the Kansai Football League

| Pos | Team | Pld | W | D | L | GF | GA | GD | Pts |
|---|---|---|---|---|---|---|---|---|---|
| 1 | Osaka Sportsman Club (C) | 7 | 7 | 0 | 0 | 38 | 5 | +33 | 14 |
| 2 | Kyoto Shiko Club | 7 | 5 | 1 | 1 | 25 | 11 | +14 | 11 |
| 3 | Dainichi Nippon Cable | 7 | 4 | 1 | 2 | 22 | 10 | +12 | 9 |
| 4 | NTT Kinki | 7 | 2 | 2 | 3 | 8 | 14 | −6 | 6 |
| 5 | Fuji Steel Hirohata | 7 | 2 | 1 | 4 | 16 | 16 | 0 | 5 |
| 6 | Wakayama Club | 7 | 1 | 3 | 3 | 10 | 16 | −6 | 5 |
| 7 | Mitsubishi Heavy Industries Kobe | 7 | 1 | 1 | 5 | 8 | 16 | −8 | 3 |
| 8 | Shiga Club | 7 | 1 | 1 | 5 | 7 | 46 | −39 | 3 |

Source: RSSSF
Rules for classification: 1) points; 2) goal difference; 3) number of goals scored.
(C) Champions
