= 1968 Japanese Regional Leagues =

Japanese amateur leagues football season

Japanese Regional Leagues
- Season: 1968
- Champions: Fujitsu; Nippon Light Metal; Dainichi Nippon Cable
- Relegated: Mitsubishi Motors Kyoto

Statistics of Japanese Regional Leagues for the 1968 season.

== Champions list ==
Region	Champions
Kantō	Fujitsu
Tōkai	Nippon Light Metal
Kansai	Dainichi Nippon Cable

== League standings ==
=== Kantō ===
The 2nd Kantō Adult Soccer League. (Shōwa 43)

Pos	Team	Pld	W	D	L	GF	GA	GD	Pts	Qualification or relegation
1	Fujitsu (C)	14	10	3	1	42	15	+27	23	Champions
2	Ibaraki Hitachi	14	9	4	1	41	15	+26	22	
3	Urawa	14	9	2	3	45	20	+25	20	
4	Kofu	14	7	1	6	37	26	+11	15	
5	Sankyo	14	4	1	9	16	35	−19	9	
6	Toshiba	14	2	4	8	20	41	−21	8	
7	Gotenshita Club (O)	14	2	4	8	13	35	−22	8	Participation in the play-off match and retained their status.
8	Kodama Club (O)	14	2	3	9	15	42	−27	7	Participation in the play-off match and retained their status.

Source: Kanto Soccer League, RSSSF
Rules for classification: 1) points; 2) goal difference; 3) number of goals scored.
(C) Champions; (O) Play-off winners
- The 7th and 8th place teams participated in the replacement match and remained after games played between Shonan Surfriders, the champion of the Kanto Adult Soccer Tournament, and Tokyo Gas, who finished second.

=== Tōkai ===
This is the 3rd edition of the Tōkai Football League.

Pos	Team	Pld	W	D	L	GF	GA	GD	Pts	Qualification or relegation
1	Nippon Light Metal (C)	7	6	0	1	21	6	+15	12	Champions
2	Toyoda Automatic Loom Works	7	6	0	1	17	5	+12	12	
3	Toyota Motors	7	5	0	2	28	5	+23	10	
4	Gifu Teachers	7	3	1	3	14	10	+4	7	
5	Daikyo Oil	7	1	3	3	10	18	−8	5	
6	Domingo Club	7	2	1	4	11	23	−12	5	
7	Nagoya	7	1	1	5	3	24	−21	3	
8	Wakaayu Club	7	1	0	6	4	17	−13	2	

Source: RSSSF
Rules for classification: 1) points; 2) goal difference; 3) number of goals scored.
(C) Champions

=== Kansai ===
This is the 3rd edition of the Kansai Football League.

Pos	Team	Pld	W	D	L	GF	GA	GD	Pts	Qualification or relegation
1	Dainichi Nippon Cable (C)	7	5	1	1	19	7	+12	11	Champions
2	Yuasa Batteries	7	4	2	1	8	4	+4	10	
3	Osaka Sportsman Club	7	3	2	2	15	10	+5	8	
4	Kyoto Shiko Club	7	4	0	3	10	9	+1	8	
5	Tanabe Pharmaceuticals	7	3	1	3	14	13	+1	7	
6	Fuji Steel Hirohata	7	3	0	4	15	19	−4	6	
7	Mitsubishi Motors Kyoto (R)	7	1	2	4	9	14	−5	4	Relegated
8	NTT Kinki	7	1	0	6	8	22	−14	2	

Source: RSSSF
Rules for classification: 1) points; 2) goal difference; 3) number of goals scored.
(C) Champions; (R) Relegated
