= 1970 Japanese Regional Leagues =

Japanese amateur leagues football season

Japanese Regional Leagues
- Season: 1970
- Champions: Kofu; Toyota Motors <> Tanabe Pharmaceuticals
- Relegated: Sankyo

Statistics of Japanese Regional Leagues for the 1970 season.

== Champions list ==
Region	Champions
Kantō	Kofu
Tōkai	Toyota Motors
Kansai	Tanabe Pharmaceuticals

== League standings ==
The 4th Kantō Adult Soccer League. (Shōwa 45)

=== Kantō ===
Pos	Team	Pld	W	D	L	GF	GA	GD	Pts	Qualification or relegation
1	Kofu (C)	14	10	2	2	27	7	+20	22	Champions
2	Towa Estate Development	14	8	5	1	31	13	+18	21	
3	Ibaraki Hitachi	14	9	1	4	28	17	+11	19	
4	Fujitsu	14	6	3	5	27	24	+3	15	
5	Urawa	14	4	3	7	25	35	−10	11	
6	Hitachi Mito Katsuta	14	5	1	8	18	30	−12	11	
7	Kodama Club	14	3	3	8	15	20	−5	9	
8	Sankyo (R)	14	1	2	11	16	41	−25	4	Relegated to Prefectural league

Source: RSSSF
Rules for classification: 1) points; 2) goal difference; 3) number of goals scored.
(C) Champions; (R) Relegated

=== Tōkai ===
This is the 5th edition of the Tōkai Football League.

Pos	Team	Pld	W	D	L	GF	GA	GD	Pts	Qualification
1	Toyota Motors (C)	14	14	0	0	46	7	+39	28	Champions
2	Nippon Light Metal	14	9	2	3	45	17	+28	20	
3	Nagoya	14	9	1	4	32	19	+13	19	
4	Toyoda Automatic Loom Works	14	7	2	5	33	23	+10	16	
5	Nippon Steel Nagoya	14	3	2	9	13	38	−25	8	
6	Gifu Teachers	14	4	0	10	26	53	−27	8	
7	Wakaayu Club	14	3	1	10	25	42	−17	7	
8	Daikyo Oil	14	3	0	11	18	39	−21	6	

Source: RSSSF
Rules for classification: 1) points; 2) goal difference; 3) number of goals scored
(C) Champions

=== Kansai ===
This is the 5th edition of the Kansai Football League.

Pos	Team	Pld	W	D	L	GF	GA	GD	Pts	Qualification
1	Tanabe Pharmaceuticals	14	10	3	1	31	12	+19	23	Champions
2	Dainichi Nippon Cable	14	9	4	1	45	13	+32	22	
3	Yuasa Batteries	14	5	4	5	11	12	−1	14	
4	NTT Kinki	14	4	4	6	17	19	−2	12	
5	Mitsubishi Motors Kyoto	14	4	4	6	19	20	−1	12	
6	Kyoto Shiko Club	14	4	3	7	17	33	−16	11	
7	Nippon Steel Hirohata (Note: NB: Fuji Steel Hirohata changed name to Nippon Steel Hirohata.)	14	3	4	7	14	23	−9	10	
8	Osaka Sportsman Club	14	3	2	9	14	36	−22	8	

Source: RSSSF
Rules for classification: 1) points; 2) goal difference; 3) number of goals scored

=== Promotion / Relegation playoffs ===
Nippon Kokan （Japan Soccer League 7th place）	4–0	Kofu Club (Qualified as All-Shakaijin Cup finalist)

Kofu Club	0–3	Nippon Kokan

Nippon Kokan retained their position in Japan Soccer League.

Nagoya Bank FC （Japan Soccer League 8th place）	1–0	Toyota Motor (Qualified as All-Shakaijin Cup finalist)

Toyota Motor	1–1	Nagoya Bank FC

Nagoya Bank FC retained their position in Japan Soccer League.
