= 1971 Japanese Regional Leagues =

Japanese amateur leagues football season

Japanese Regional Leagues
- Season: 1971
- Promoted: Towa Estate Development

Statistics of Japanese Regional Leagues in the 1971 season.

== Champions list ==
Region	Champions
Kantō	Towa Estate Development
Tokai	Toyota Motors
Kansai	Kyoto Shiko Club

By winning the All Japan Senior Football Championship and then defeating Nagoya Bank in a promotion/relegation series, Towa ED was promoted to the Japan Soccer League; it and the remaining JSL clubs constituted the new JSL First Division, while Toyota, Kyoto and eight other clubs were chosen for the new JSL Second Division.

== League standings ==
=== Kantō ===
The 5th Kantō Adult Soccer League. (Shōwa 46)

Pos	Team	Pld	W	D	L	GF	GA	GD	Pts	Promotion
1	Towa Estate Development (C)	14	11	1	2	51	12	+39	23	Promoted to First Division
2	Kofu	14	8	3	3	31	15	+16	19	Promoted to form the new Second Division
3	Yomiuri	14	9	0	5	29	17	+12	18	Promoted to form the new Second Division
4	Fujitsu	14	7	3	4	24	16	+8	17	Promoted to form the new Second Division
5	Ibaraki Hitachi	14	3	4	7	12	22	−10	10	
6	Kodama Club	14	5	0	9	14	32	−18	10	
7	Hitachi Mito Katsuta	14	4	1	9	12	32	−20	9	
8	Urawa	14	2	2	10	14	41	−27	6	

Source: RSSSF
Rules for classification: 1) points; 2) goal difference; 3) number of goals scored.
(C) Champions

=== Tōkai ===
This is the 6th edition of the Tōkai Football League.

Pos	Team	Pld	W	D	L	GF	GA	GD	Pts	Promotion
1	Toyota Motors (C)	14	12	2	0	50	11	+39	26	Promoted to form the new Second Division
2	Nippon Light Metal	14	8	4	2	33	17	+16	20	Promoted to form the new Second Division
3	Toyoda Automatic Loom Works	14	8	1	5	38	22	+16	17	Promoted to form the new Second Division
4	Nagoya	14	6	3	5	35	30	+5	15	
5	Wakaayu Club	14	5	1	8	24	37	−13	11	
6	Gifu Teachers	14	4	2	8	23	34	−11	10	
7	Daikyo Oil	14	3	1	10	20	46	−26	7	
8	Nippon Steel Nagoya	14	2	2	10	14	40	−26	6	

Source: RSSSF
Rules for classification: 1) points; 2) goal difference; 3) number of goals scored.
(C) Champions

=== Kansai ===
This is the 6th edition of the Kansai Football League.

Pos	Team	Pld	W	D	L	GF	GA	GD	Pts	Promotion
1	Kyoto Shiko Club (C)	14	12	0	2	43	12	+31	24	Promoted to form the new Second Division
2	Tanabe Pharmaceuticals	14	8	2	4	26	16	+10	18	Promoted to form the new Second Division
3	Dainichi Nippon Cable	14	8	2	4	28	28	0	18	Promoted to form the new Second Division
4	NTT Kinki	14	7	2	5	27	25	+2	16	Promoted to form the new Second Division
5	Nippon Steel Hirohata	14	5	2	7	24	24	0	12	
6	Mitsubishi Motors Kyoto	14	5	2	7	22	28	−6	12	
7	Yuasa Batteries	14	3	4	7	24	30	−6	10	
8	Osaka Sportsman Club	14	0	2	12	16	47	−31	2	

Source: RSSSF
Rules for classification: 1) points; 2) goal difference; 3) number of goals scored.
(C) Champions

=== JSL1 Promotion playoffs ===
Nippon Kokan （Japan Soccer League 7th place）	2–2	Tanabe Pharmaceuticals (Qualified as All-Shakaijin Cup finalist)

Tanabe Pharmaceuticals	0–0	Nippon Kokan

Nippon Kokan retained their position in Japan Soccer League, Tanabe Pharmaceuticals promoted to Japan Soccer League 2

Nagoya Bank FC （Japan Soccer League 8th place）	0–0	Towa Estate Development (Qualified as All-Shakaijin Cup finalist)

Towa Estate Development	1–0	Nagoya Bank FC

Towa Estate Development promoted to Japan Soccer League 1.
