= 1991 Japanese Regional Leagues =

Japanese amateur leagues football season

Japanese Regional Leagues
- Season: 1991

Statistics of Japanese Regional Leagues for the 1991 season.

== Champions list ==
Region	Champions
Hokkaido	Sapporo Mazda
Tohoku	NEC Yamagata
Kantō	Nissan Motors Farm
Hokushin'etsu	Teihens
Tōkai	Seino Transportation
Kansai	Osaka Gas
Chūgoku	Mazda Toyo
Shikoku	Teijin
Kyushu	NTT Kyushu

== League standings ==
=== Hokkaido ===
Division 1
Pos	Team	Pld	W	D	L	GF	GA	GD	Pts
1	Sapporo Mazda	14	12	1	1	46	10	+36	37
2	Hokuden	14	11	2	1	49	9	+40	35
3	Nippon Steel Muroran	14	8	3	3	21	14	+7	27
4	Sapporo	14	8	2	4	31	16	+15	26
5	Hakodate Mazda	14	4	2	8	32	29	+3	14
6	Asahikawa Daisetsu Club	14	4	1	9	25	47	−22	13
7	Blackpecker Hakodate	14	2	2	10	13	34	−21	8
8	Hakodate City Government	14	0	1	13	10	68	−58	1

Source: RSSSF
Rules for classification: 3 points for a win

Division 2
Pos	Team	Pld	W	D	L	GF	GA	GD	Pts
1	Sapporo University OB	7	6	1	0	19	3	+16	19
2	Nippon Oil Muroran	7	5	0	2	16	14	+2	15
3	Otaru Shuyukai	7	4	0	3	11	7	+4	12
4	Muroran Shukyu Club	7	4	0	3	12	11	+1	12
5	Japan Steel Works Muroran	7	3	0	4	16	12	+4	9
6	Sanyo Kokusaku Pulp	7	2	1	4	8	11	−3	7
7	Asahikawa Shukyudan	7	1	1	5	10	20	−10	4
8	Hokushukai	7	1	1	5	8	22	−14	4

Source: RSSSF
Rules for classification: 3 points for a win

=== Tohoku ===
Pos	Team	Pld	W	D	L	GF	GA	GD	Pts
1	NEC Yamagata	14	14	0	0	67	5	+62	28
2	Tohoku Electric Power	14	9	2	3	32	11	+21	20
3	TDK	14	8	1	5	27	26	+1	17
4	Akita City Government	14	7	2	5	26	20	+6	16
5	Matsushima	14	6	4	4	28	28	0	16
6	Nakata Club	14	3	1	10	14	41	−27	7
7	Morioka Zebra	14	3	1	10	10	43	−33	7
8	Ishinomaki City Government	14	0	1	13	8	38	−30	1

Source: RSSSF
Rules for classification: 2 points for a win

=== Kantō ===
Pos	Team	Pld	W	D	L	GF	GA	GD	Pts
1	Nissan Motors Farm	18	14	2	2	55	15	+40	30
2	Chiba Teachers	18	12	5	1	41	20	+21	29
3	Honda Luminozo Sayama	18	11	4	3	41	23	+18	26
4	Ibaraki Hitachi	18	8	3	7	29	25	+4	19
5	Saitama Teachers	18	5	6	7	21	27	−6	16
6	Tochigi Teachers	18	5	6	7	24	35	−11	16
7	Kanagawa Teachers	18	5	3	10	21	42	−21	13
8	Furukawa Chiba	18	4	4	10	20	31	−11	12
9	Asahi	18	2	6	10	25	41	−16	10
10	Ibaraki Teachers	18	3	3	12	22	41	−19	9

Source: RSSSF
Rules for classification: 2 points for a win

=== Hokushin'etsu ===
Pos	Team	Pld	W	D	L	GF	GA	GD	Pts
1	Teihens	9	7	2	0	23	3	+20	16
2	Kanazawa	9	6	1	2	23	9	+14	13
3	Niigata eleven	9	5	3	1	18	12	+6	13
4	YKK	9	5	2	2	20	10	+10	12
5	Yamaga	9	4	1	4	17	12	+5	9
6	Fukui Teachers	9	3	3	3	12	16	−4	9
7	Seiyū Club	9	3	3	3	11	16	−5	9
8	Nissei Plastic Industrial	9	2	2	5	11	11	0	6
9	Toyama Club	9	1	1	7	8	27	−19	3
10	Naoetsu	9	0	0	9	8	35	−27	0

Source: RSSSF
Rules for classification: 2 points for a win

=== Tōkai ===
Pos	Team	Pld	W	D	L	GF	GA	GD	Pts
1	Seino Transportation	16	12	3	1	42	12	+30	27
2	Denso	16	12	2	2	46	14	+32	26
3	Jatco	16	10	3	3	35	18	+17	23
4	Toyota Motors Higashi-Fuji	16	8	3	5	26	19	+7	19
5	Fujieda City Government	16	7	4	5	17	21	−4	18
6	Maruyasu	16	3	4	9	23	31	−8	10
7	Toyoda Machine Works	16	8	1	7	25	33	−8	17
8	Yamaha Club	16	5	4	7	31	31	0	14
9	Toyota	16	3	6	7	20	34	−14	12
10	Minolta Camera	16	5	2	9	15	30	−15	12
11	Nagoya	16	2	3	11	18	33	−15	7
12	Fuyo Club	16	3	1	12	20	42	−22	7

Source: RSSSF
Rules for classification: 2 points for a win

=== Kansai ===
Pos	Team	Pld	W	D	L	GF	GA	GD	Pts
1	Osaka Gas	22	16	4	2	44	10	+34	52
2	Osaka University of Health and Sport sciences Club	22	14	3	5	37	17	+20	45
3	Central Kobe	22	14	1	7	37	20	+17	43
4	NTT Kansai	22	11	6	5	35	18	+17	39
5	Kyoto Police	22	11	5	6	38	33	+5	38
6	Sanyo Electric Sumoto	22	10	4	8	26	17	+9	34
7	Mitsubishi Cable Industries	22	8	4	10	25	34	−9	28
8	West Osaka	22	6	5	11	20	40	−20	23
9	Ain Food	22	6	6	10	27	34	−7	24
10	Mitsubishi Motors Kyoto	22	6	3	13	20	34	−14	21
11	Osaka Teachers	22	4	6	12	18	32	−14	18
12	Tanabe	22	2	1	19	22	60	−38	7

Source: RSSSF
Rules for classification: 3 points for a win

=== Chūgoku ===
Pos	Team	Pld	W	D	L	GF	GA	GD	Pts
1	Mazda Toyo	14	11	2	1	37	12	+25	35
2	NTN Okayama	14	8	3	3	27	16	+11	27
3	Mitsubishi Motors Mizushima	14	6	4	4	24	17	+7	22
4	Yamaguchi Teachers	14	7	1	6	31	28	+3	22
5	Mazda Auto Hiroshima	14	4	4	6	25	29	−4	16
6	Hiroshima Teachers	14	3	6	5	16	19	−3	15
7	Hiroshima Fujita	14	4	1	9	31	45	−14	13
8	Tottori	14	2	1	11	20	45	−25	7

Source: RSSSF
Rules for classification: 3 points for a win

=== Shikoku ===
Pos	Team	Pld	W	D	L	GF	GA	GD	Pts
1	Teijin	14	14	0	0	58	11	+47	28
2	Kagawa Shiun	14	10	1	3	42	15	+27	21
3	NTT Shikoku	14	10	1	3	46	22	+24	21
4	Nangoku Club	14	7	1	6	32	30	+2	15
5	Matsuyama Club	14	6	1	7	31	24	+7	13
6	Alex	14	2	3	9	16	50	−34	7
7	Sportsshop Ikeda	14	1	3	10	20	55	−35	5
8	Imao	14	0	2	12	18	56	−38	2

Source: RSSSF
Rules for classification: 2 points for a win

=== Kyushu ===
Pos	Team	Pld	W	D	L	GF	GA	GD	Pts
1	NTT Kyushu	20	16	2	2	54	14	+40	50
2	Mitsubishi Chemical Kurosaki	20	15	3	2	78	24	+54	48
3	Nippon Steel Yawata	20	12	2	6	61	30	+31	38
4	Kawasoe Club	20	9	8	3	43	29	+14	35
5	Mitsubishi Heavy Industries Nagasaki	20	9	4	7	33	31	+2	31
6	Kumamoto Teachers	20	7	4	9	47	55	−8	25
7	Tobiume Club	20	6	7	7	32	43	−11	25
8	Nippon Steel Oita	20	7	2	11	24	27	−3	23
9	Kagoshima Teachers	20	4	4	12	18	38	−20	16
10	Miyazaki Teachers	20	4	1	15	27	71	−44	13
11	Saga Nanyo Club	20	1	3	16	17	72	−55	6

Source: RSSSF
Rules for classification: 3 points for a win
