= 1969 Japanese Regional Leagues =

Japanese amateur leagues football season

Japanese Regional Leagues
- Season: 1969
- Champions: Kofu; Nippon Light Metal <> Kyoto Shiko Club
- Relegated: Toshiba; Gotenshita Club; Domingo Club; Sumitomo Metals

Statistics of Japanese Regional Leagues in the 1969 season.

== Champions list ==
Region	Champions
Kantō	Kofu
Tōkai	Nippon Light Metal
Kansai	Kyoto Shiko Club

== League standings ==
=== Kantō ===
The 3rd Kantō Adult Soccer League. (Shōwa 44)

Pos	Team	Pld	W	D	L	GF	GA	GD	Pts	Qualification or relegation
1	Kofu (C, Q)	14	12	1	1	34	12	+22	25	Champions and qualified to Promotion playoff
2	Urawa (Q)	14	9	3	2	38	15	+23	21	Qualified to Promotion playoff
3	Fujitsu	14	7	3	4	34	19	+15	17	
4	Ibaraki Hitachi	14	7	3	4	30	17	+13	17	
5	Kodama Club	14	7	3	4	23	16	+7	17	
6	Sankyo	14	2	3	9	24	31	−7	7	
7	Toshiba (R)	14	2	2	10	16	37	−21	6	Relegated to Kanagawa Shakaijin Soccer League.
8	Gotenshita Club (R)	14	1	0	13	12	64	−52	2	Relegated to Tokyo Shakaijin Soccer League.

Source: Kanto Soccer League, RSSSF
Rules for classification: 1) points; 2) goal difference; 3) number of goals scored.
(C) Champions; (Q) Qualified for the phase indicated; (R) Relegated

=== Tōkai ===
This is the 4th edition of the Tōkai Football League.

Pos	Team	Pld	W	D	L	GF	GA	GD	Pts	Qualification or relegation
1	Nippon Light Metal (C)	7	7	0	0	42	2	+40	14	Champions
2	Toyota Motors	7	5	1	1	22	2	+20	11	
3	Toyoda Automatic Loom Works	7	3	2	2	25	9	+16	8	
4	Daikyo Oil	7	3	1	3	12	9	+3	7	
5	Gifu Teachers	7	3	0	4	12	14	−2	6	
6	Wakaayu Club	7	3	0	4	6	14	−8	6	
7	Nagoya	7	2	0	5	13	17	−4	4	
8	Domingo Club (R)	7	0	0	7	0	65	−65	0	Relegation to Prefectural League

Source: cyic.co.uk, RSSSF
Rules for classification: 1) points; 2) goal difference; 3) number of goals scored.
(C) Champions; (R) Relegated

=== Kansai ===
This is the 4th edition of the Kansai Football League.

Pos	Team	Pld	W	D	L	GF	GA	GD	Pts	Qualification or relegation
1	Kyoto Shiko Club (C)	14	5	6	3	23	15	+8	16	Champions
2	NTT Kinki	14	5	6	3	16	12	+4	16	
3	Dainichi Nippon Cable	14	5	5	4	22	13	+9	15	
4	Yuasa Batteries	14	6	2	6	21	19	+2	14	
5	Osaka Sportsman Club	14	4	6	4	16	21	−5	14	
6	Fuji Steel Hirohata	14	4	5	5	20	20	0	13	
7	Tanabe Pharmaceuticals	14	4	5	5	18	20	−2	13	
8	Sumitomo Metals (R)	14	4	3	7	11	27	−16	11	Relegated to Osaka Shakaijin Soccer League

Source: cyic.co.uk, RSSSF
Rules for classification: 1) points; 2) goal difference; 3) number of goals scored.
(C) Champions; (R) Relegated

=== Promotion / Relegation playoffs ===
Hitachi FC （Japan Soccer League 7th place）	2–0	Kofu Club (Kanto Soccer League winner)

Kofu Club （Japan Soccer League 7th place）	0–1	Hitachi FC (Kanto Soccer League winner)

Hitachi FC retained their position in Japan Soccer League

Nagoya Bank FC （Japan Soccer League 8th place）	2–0	Urawa Club (Kanto Soccer League runners-up)

Urawa Club (Kanto Soccer League runners-up)	1–2	Nagoya Bank FC （Japan Soccer League 8th place）

Nagoya Bank FC retained their position in Japan Soccer League
