= Japan Football League (1992–1998) =

- Founded: 1992; 34 years ago
- Folded: 1998; 28 years ago
- Country: Japan
- Confederation: AFC
- Divisions: 2 (1992–1993); 1 (1994–1998)
- Number of clubs: 16
- Level on pyramid: 2–3 (1992–1993); 2 (1994–1998)
- Promotion to: J.League
- Relegation to: Japanese Regional Leagues
- Domestic cup(s): Emperor's Cup; J.League Cup (associates)
- Last champions: Tokyo Gas (1998)
- Most championships: 7 clubs (1 title each)

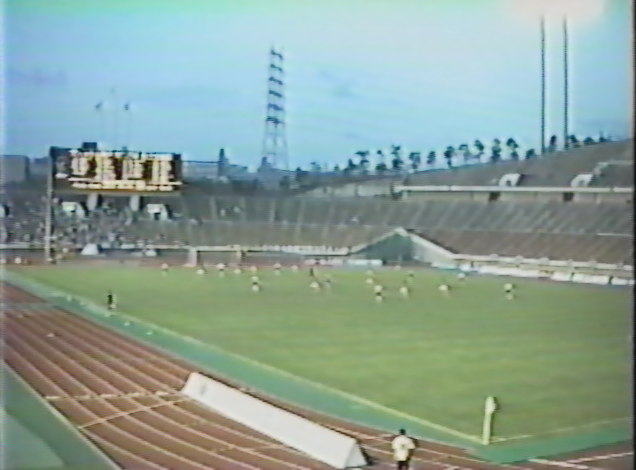
Vissel Kobe vs. NTT Kanto F.C. at Kobe Universiade Memorial Stadium in 1995

The former Japan Football League (ジャパンフットボールリーグ, Japan Futtobōru Līgu) was an association football league that existed from 1992 to 1998. Also known as the JFL, it was the 2nd tier of the Japanese football hierarchy following J.League.

== History ==
When the Japan Football Association decided to found a professional football league, the Japan Soccer League (JSL), the top-flight league until the 1991/92 season, was reorganised into two newly formed leagues. One was the Japan Professional Football League as known as J. League, the first-ever professional football league in Japan. The other was the former Japan Football League.

Out of twenty eight clubs who were the members of the JSL division 1 and 2, nine along with independent Shimizu S-Pulse formed the J.League. They played the inaugural 1992 season of the former JFL together with Osaka Gas and Seino Transportation, the top two places in the Regional League promotion series. The initial configuration was two divisions of ten clubs each, but from 1994, the format was changed to a single division of sixteen clubs.

The former JFL ceased to exist at the end of the 1998 season when J.League Division 2 was formed. Out of sixteen clubs who played the last season of the JFL, nine decided and were accepted to play in J2 and the other seven joined the new JFL.

== Participating clubs ==
=== Division 1 ===
Club name	First season in JFL	Seasons in JFL	Home town(s)	First season in D2	Seasons in D2	Last spell in D2	Last JFL title	Current league
Albirex Niigata	1998	1	Niigata & Seirō, Niigata	1998	1	1998	—	J1
Omiya Ardija	1994	5	Saitama	1987/88	10	1994–1998	—	J3
Shonan Bellmare	1992	2	Hiratsuka, Kanagawa	1990/91	4	1990/91–1993	1993	J1
Fukuoka Blux	1993	3	Fukuoka	1991/92	4	1993–1995	1995	J1
Brummel Sendai	1995	4	Sendai, Miyagi	1995	4	1995–1998	—	J2
Cerezo Osaka	1992	3	Osaka, Osaka	1991/92	4	1991/92–1994	1994	J1
Consadole Sapporo	1992	6	Sapporo, Hokkaido	1978	17	1992–1997	1997	J1
Cosmo Oil Yokkaichi	1994	3	Yokkaichi, Mie	1980	10	1994–1996	—	Defunct
Denso	1996	3	Kariya, Aichi	1996	3	1996–1998	—	Tokai League D1
Kawasaki Frontale	1992	7	Kawasaki, Kanagawa	1972	20	1979–1998	—	J1
Fukushima FC	1995	3	Fukushima	1995	3	1995–1997	—	Defunct
Tosu Futures	1994	3	Tosu, Saga	1994	3	1994–1996	—	Defunct
Mito HollyHock	1997	2	Mito, Ibaraki	1997	2	1997–1998	—	J2
Honda Motors	1992	6	Hamamatsu, Shizuoka	1975	12	1994–1998	1996	New JFL
Jatco SC	1997	2	Numazu, Shizuoka	1997	2	1997–1998	—	Defunct
Kokushikan University	1998	1	Machida, Tokyo	1998	1	1998	—	Kantō University League
Montedio Yamagata	1994	5	All cities/towns in Yamagata	1994	5	1994–1998	—	J2
NKK SC	1992	1	Kawasaki, Kanagawa	1980	5	1991/92–1992	—	Defunct
Otsuka FC Vortis Tokushima	1994	5	All cities/towns in Tokushima	1990/91	7	1994–1998	—	J2
Kyoto Purple Sanga	1993	3	Southwestern cities/towns in Kyoto	1972	13	1993–1995	—	J1
Kashiwa Reysol	1992	3	Kashiwa, Chiba	1987/88	6	1992–1994	—	J1
Sagan Tosu	1997	2	Tosu, Saga	1997	2	1997–1998	—	J1
Seino Transportation	1994	4	All cities/towns in Gifu	1985	7	1994–1997	—	Defunct
Sony Sendai	1998	1	Miyagi	1998	1	1998	—	New JFL
Tokyo Gas	1992	7	Tokyo	1991/92	8	1991/92–1998	1998	J1
Oita Trinity	1996	3	Ōita	1996	3	1996–1998	—	J2
Ventforet Kofu	1994	5	All cities/towns in Yamanashi	1972	25	1994–1998	—	J2
Vissel Kobe	1994	2	Kobe, Hyōgo	1986/87	9	1994–1995	—	J1
Yamaha Motors	1992	2	Iwata, Shizuoka	1979	4	1992–1993	1992	J1

- "Seasons in D2", "Last spell in D2", and "Last D2 title" include participation in Japan Soccer League D2 and take into account seasons up to 1998, when the league ceased to exist

=== Division 2 ===
Club name	First season in JFL D2	Seasons in JFL D2	Home town(s)	Last spell in JFL D2	Current league
Fukuoka Blux	1992	1	Fujieda, Shizuoka	1992	J1
Cosmo Oil Yokkaichi	1992	2	Yokkaichi, Mie	1992–1993	Defunct
Honda Motors	1993	1	Hamamatsu, Shizuoka	1993	New JFL
Kawasaki Steel	1992	2	Kurashiki, Okayama	1992–1993	J1 (as Vissel Kobe)
Kofu SC	1992	2	All cities/towns in Yamanashi	1992–1993	J2
Kyoto Shiko	1992	1	Southwestern cities/towns in Kyoto	1992	J1
NKK SC	1993	1	Kawasaki, Kanagawa	1993	Defunct
NTT Kanto	1992	2	Saitama	1992–1993	J3
Osaka Gas	1992	1	Osaka, Osaka	1992	Osaka League D1
PJM Futures	1993	1	Hamamatsu, Shizuoka	1993	Defunct
Seino Transportation	1992	2	All cities/towns in Gifu	1992–1993	Defunct
Tanabe Pharmaceuticals	1992	1	Osaka, Osaka	1992	Defunct
Toho Titanium	1992	2	Chigasaki, Kanagawa	1992–1993	Kantō League D2
Toyota Higashi-Fuji	1993	1	Shizuoka	1993	Defunct

== Championship, promotion and relegation history ==
Season	Champions	Runners-up	Promoted to J.League after the season	Promoted from Regional Leagues before the season	Relegated to Regional Leagues after the season
1992	Div. 1-Yamaha; Div. 2-Chuo Bohan Fujieda	Div. 1-Hitachi; Div. 2-Kyoto Shiko Club	None	Osaka Gas; Seino Transportation	Tanabe Pharmaceutical S.C. Osaka Gas S.C.
1993	Div. 1-Bellmare Hiratsuka; Div. 2-Honda FC	Div. 1-Júbilo Iwata; Div. 2-PJM	Hiratsuka; Iwata	Toyota Higashifuji; PJM	Toho Titanium SC; NKK F.C. (disbanded); Toyota Higashifuji (disbanded)
1994	Cerezo Osaka	Kashiwa Reysol	Cerezo; Kashiwa	NEC Yamagata	None
1995	Fukuoka Blux	Kyoto Purple Sanga	Fukuoka; Kyoto	Brummell Sendai; Fukushima FC	None
1996	Honda FC	Vissel Kobe	Kobe	Nippon Denso; Ōita F.C.	Cosmo Oil Yokkaichi (disbanded); Tosu Futures (disbanded)
1997	Consadole Sapporo	Tokyo Gas	Sapporo	Prima Ham FC Tsuchiura; Jatco F.C. Sagan Tosu (new club, replaces Tosu Futures)	Fukushima FC (disbanded); Seino Transportation F.C. (disbanded)
1998	Tokyo Gas	Kawasaki Frontale	None	Albirex Niigata; Sony Sendai FC, Kokushikan Univ. S.C. (recommended by Univ. Assoc.)	None
1998	Tokyo Gas	Kawasaki Frontale	*The following clubs were admitted to the new J.League Division 2: Brummell Sendai (Vegalta Sendai), Montedio Yamagata, Omiya Ardija, Tokyo Gas F.C. (FC Tokyo), Kawasaki Frontale, Ventforet Kofu, Albirex Niigata, Sagan Tosu, Ōita F.C. (Oita Trinita)		

=== Most successful clubs ===
Club	Winners	Runners-up	Winning seasons	Runners-up seasons
Júbilo Iwata	1	1	1992	1993
Tokyo Gas	1	1	1998	1997
Bellmare Hiratsuka	1	0	1993	
Cerezo Osaka	1	0	1994	
Fukuoka Blux	1	0	1995	
Honda FC	1	0	1996	
Consadole Sapporo	1	0	1997	
Kashiwa Reysol	0	2		1992, 1994
Kyoto Purple Sanga	0	1		1995
Vissel Kobe	0	1		1996
Kawasaki Frontale	0	1		1998

== See also ==
Sporting positions
Preceded by Japan Soccer League Second Division	Second tier of Japanese football 1992–1998	Succeeded by J.League Division 2
