= 1972 Japanese Regional Leagues =

Japanese amateur leagues football season

Japanese Regional Leagues
- Season: 1972

Statistics of Japanese Regional Leagues for the 1972 season.

== Champions list ==
Region	Champions
Kantō	Urawa
Tōkai	Nagoya
Kansai	Nippon Steel Hirohata

== League standings ==
=== Kantō ===
The 6th Kantō Adult Soccer League. (Shōwa 47)

Pos	Team	Pld	W	D	L	GF	GA	GD	Pts	Qualification or relegation
1	Urawa (C, P)	14	10	2	2	38	19	+19	22	
2	Hitachi Mito Katsuta	14	9	2	3	27	17	+10	20	
3	Ibaraki Hitachi	14	8	3	3	34	11	+23	19	
4	Kodama Club	14	9	0	5	27	16	+11	18	
5	Yokohama Club	14	4	4	6	22	24	−2	12	
6	Aoyama	14	4	4	6	17	25	−8	12	
7	Toshiba (R)	14	2	4	8	13	24	−11	8	Relegated to the Kanagawa Prefectural League
8	Hitachi Tochigi (R)	14	0	1	13	14	56	−42	1	Relegated to the Tochigi Prefectural League

Source: RSSSF
Rules for classification: 1) Points; 2) Goal difference; 3) Number of goals scored.
(C) Champions; (P) Promoted; (R) Relegated

=== Tōkai ===
This is the 7th edition of the Tōkai Football League.

Pos	Team	Pld	W	D	L	GF	GA	GD	Pts	Qualification or relegation
1	Nagoya (C)	14	10	3	1	48	22	+26	23	
2	Daikyo Oil	14	9	1	4	41	19	+22	19	
3	Sumitomo Bakelite	14	8	2	4	33	24	+9	18	
4	Toyoda Machine Works	14	8	2	4	27	23	+4	18	
5	Wakaayu Club	14	8	0	6	31	28	+3	16	
6	Gifu Teachers	14	5	2	7	38	31	+7	12	
7	Toyota Auto Body (R)	14	2	0	12	22	52	−30	4	Relegated to Aichi Prefecture League
8	Nippon Steel Nagoya (R)	14	1	0	13	12	53	−41	2	Relegated to Aichi Prefecture League

Source: RSSSF
Rules for classification: 1) Points; 2) Goal difference; 3) Number of goals scored.
(C) Champions; (R) Relegated

=== Kansai ===
This is the 7th edition of the Kansai Football League.

Pos	Team	Pld	W	D	L	GF	GA	GD	Pts	Qualification or relegation
1	Nippon Steel Hirohata (C)	14	8	2	4	34	21	+13	18	
2	Yuasa Batteries	14	6	5	3	24	15	+9	17	
3	Yanmar Club	14	6	4	4	17	13	+4	16	
4	Mitsubishi Motors Kyoto	14	7	2	5	18	15	+3	16	
5	Omi Club	14	6	2	6	15	23	−8	14	
6	Mitsubishi Heavy Industries Kobe	14	5	3	6	19	20	−1	13	
7	Wakayama Teachers	14	4	4	6	22	24	−2	12	
8	Osaka Sportsman Club (R)	14	1	4	9	17	35	−18	6	Relegated to the Osaka Prefectural League

Source: RSSSF
Rules for classification: 1) Points; 2) Goal difference; 3) Number of goals scored.
(C) Champions; (R) Relegated
