= Shinnosuke Fukuda =

Japanese footballer (born 2000)

- Fukuda with Kyoto Sanga in 2026

Personal information
- Full name: Shinnosuke Fukuda
- Date of birth: 4 September 2000 (age 26)
- Place of birth: Urakawa, Japan
- Height: 1.74 m (5 ft 9 in)
- Position: Defender

Team information
- Current team: Legia Warsaw (on loan from Kyoto Sanga)
- Number: 2

Youth career
- –2018: Hokkaido Consadole Sapporo

College career
Years	Team	Apps	(Gls)
2019–2022	Meiji University		

Senior career*
Years	Team	Apps	(Gls)
2018	Hokkaido Consadole Sapporo	0	(0)
2023–	Kyoto Sanga	103	(10)
2026–	→ Legia Warsaw (loan)	0	(0)
- * Club domestic league appearances and goals as of 17:07, 30 August 2026 (UTC)

Shinnosuke Fukuda (Japanese: 福田 心之助; born 4 September 2000) is a Japanese professional footballer who plays as a defender for Ekstraklasa club Legia Warsaw, on loan from J1 League club Kyoto Sanga.

== Early life ==
Fukuda was born on 4 September 2000 in Urakawa, Japan. A native of the city, he has a sister and a brother and started playing football at the age of five. Growing up, he attended Meiji University in Japan.

== Career ==
=== Kyoto Sanga ===
As a youth player, Fukuda joined the youth academy of Hokkaido Consadole Sapporo. Following his stint there, he signed for Kyoto Sanga ahead of the 2023 season.

==== Loan to Legia Warsaw ====
On 4 September 2026, Fukuda moved to Polish club Legia Warsaw on loan for the rest of the season.

== Style of play ==
Kameda plays as a defender. Japanese newspaper Sports Nippon wrote in 2023 that he "possesses ample stamina and speed, tenacious defense, and precise crosses, allowing him to repeatedly move up and down the field for 90 minutes".

== Career statistics ==
As of match played 29 August 2026

Appearances and goals by club, season and competition
Club	Season	League			National cup (Note: Includes Emperor's Cup)		League cup (Note: Includes J.League Cup)		Other		Total	
Club	Season	Division	Apps	Goals	Apps	Goals	Apps	Goals	Apps	Goals	Apps	Goals
Hokkaido Consadole Sapporo	2018	J1 League	0	0	0	0	0	0	—		0	0
Kyoto Sanga	2023	J1 League	21	3	1	0	6	0	—		28	3
Kyoto Sanga	2024	J1 League	34	2	3	0	0	0	—		37	2
Kyoto Sanga	2025	J1 League	31	4	3	1	2	0	—		36	5
Kyoto Sanga	2026–27	J1 100 Year Vision League	13	0	—		—		—		13	0
Kyoto Sanga	2026–27	J1 League	4	1	—		—		—		4	1
Kyoto Sanga	Total		103	10	7	1	8	0	0	0	118	11
Legia Warsaw (loan)	2026–27	Ekstraklasa	0	0	—		—		—		0	0
Career total			103	10	7	1	8	0	0	0	118	11
