= Shohei Takeda =

Japanese footballer

Shohei Takeda 武田 将平
Personal information
- Date of birth: 4 April 1994 (age 32)
- Place of birth: Kanagawa, Japan
- Height: 1.81 m (5 ft 11 in)
- Position: Midfielder

Team information
- Current team: Shonan Bellmare
- Number: 6

Youth career
- Little Jumbo SC
- –2009: Isehara Junior High School
- 2010–2012: RKU Kashiwa High School

College career
Years	Team	Apps	(Gls)
2013–2016	Kanagawa University		

Senior career*
Years	Team	Apps	(Gls)
2017–2020	Fagiano Okayama	43	(4)
2020	→ Ventforet Kofu (loan)	34	(3)
2021–2025	Kyoto Sanga	107	(3)
2026–	Shonan Bellmare	11	(0)
- * Club domestic league appearances and goals as of 15:41, 21 April 2026 (UTC)

Shohei Takeda (武田 将平, Takeda Shohei; born 4 April 1994, in Kanagawa Prefecture) is a Japanese professional footballer who plays as a midfielder for J2 League club Shonan Bellmare.

== Club career ==
Takeda marked his professional debut with a 51st-minute goal against Oita Trinita in a 1–1 draw on 28 May 2017.

== Career statistics ==
=== Club ===
As of 21 April 2026.

Appearances and goals by club, season and competition
Club	Season	League			National cup (Note: Includes Emperors Cup)		League cup (Note: Includes J.League Cup)		Other		Total	
Club	Season	Division	Apps	Goals	Apps	Goals	Apps	Goals	Apps	Goals	Apps	Goals
Kanagawa University	2016	–			2	0	–		–		2	0
Fagiano Okayama	2017	J2 League	1	1	2	0	–		–		3	1
Fagiano Okayama	2018	J2 League	15	2	1	0	–		–		16	2
Fagiano Okayama	2019	J2 League	27	1	1	0	–		–		28	1
Fagiano Okayama	Total		43	4	4	0	0	0	0	0	47	4
Ventforet Kofu (loan)	2020	J2 League	34	3	–		–		–		34	3
Kyoto Sanga	2021	J2 League	36	1	0	0	0	0	0	0	36	1
Kyoto Sanga	2022	J1 League	31	1	0	0	5	0	1 (Note: Appearance in J1/J2 play-offs)	0	37	1
Kyoto Sanga	2023	J1 League	13	0	0	0	0	0	0	0	13	0
Kyoto Sanga	2024	J1 League	12	0	0	0	0	0	0	0	12	0
Kyoto Sanga	2025	J1 League	15	1	2	0	3	0	0	0	20	1
Kyoto Sanga	Total		107	3	2	0	8	0	1	0	118	3
Shonan Bellmare	2026	J2/J3 (100)	11	0	–		–		–		11	0
Career total			195	10	8	0	8	0	1	0	212	10
