= Temma Matsuda =

Japanese footballer

Temma Matsuda 松田天馬
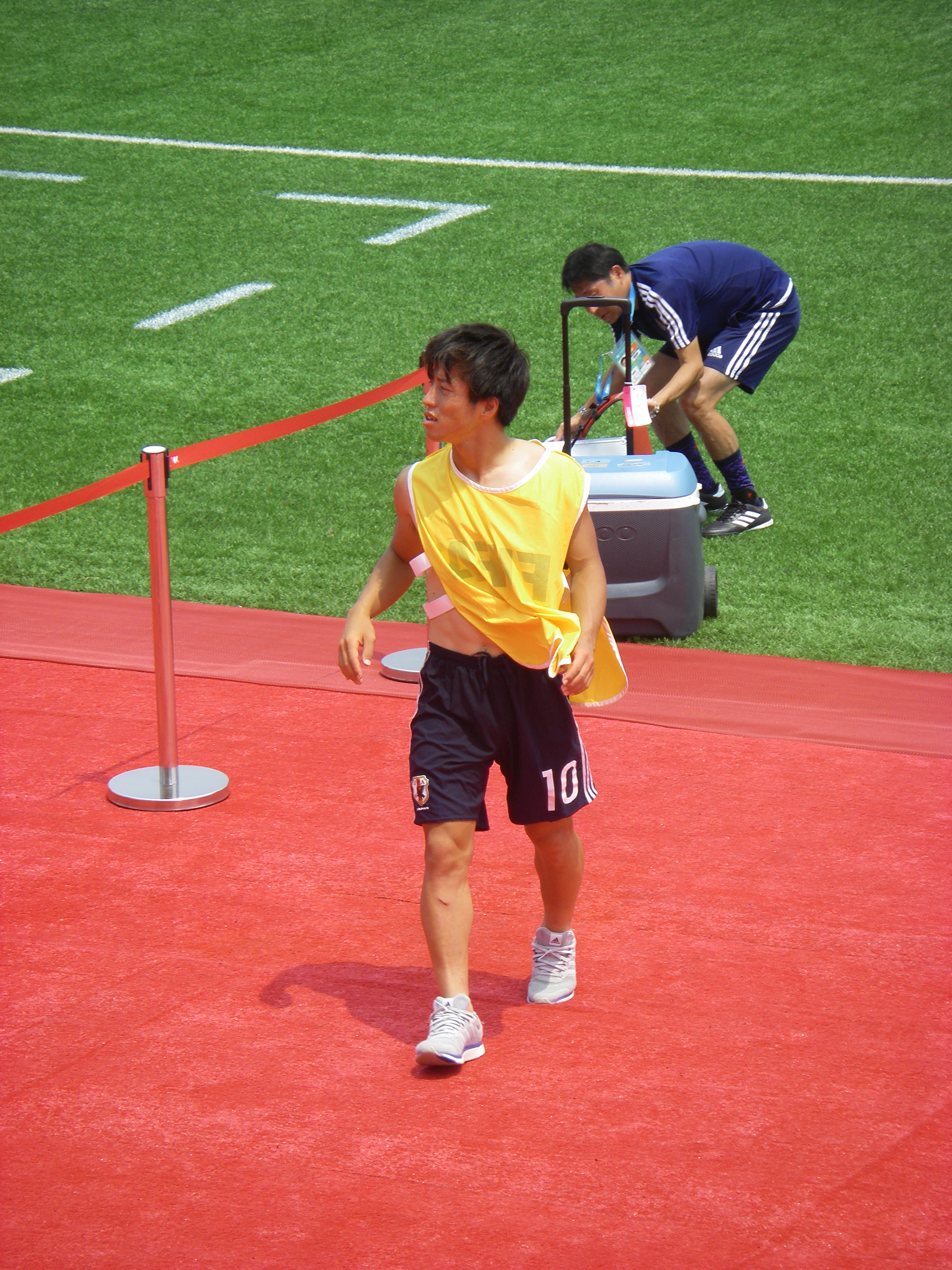

Personal information
- Full name: Temma Matsuda
- Date of birth: June 11, 1995 (age 31)
- Place of birth: Kumamoto, Japan
- Height: 1.64 m (5 ft 4 1/2 in)
- Position: Midfielder

Team information
- Current team: Kyoto Sanga
- Number: 18

Youth career
- 2002–2010: Kumamoto United SC
- 2011–2013: Higashi Fukuoka High School

College career
Years	Team	Apps	(Gls)
2014–2017	NIFS Kanoya		

Senior career*
Years	Team	Apps	(Gls)
2017–2020	Shonan Bellmare	89	(5)
2021–	Kyoto Sanga	151	(10)
Medal record
Shonan Bellmare
Winner	J.League Cup	2018
- * Club domestic league appearances and goals as of 1 August 2026

Temma Matsuda (松田 天馬, Matsuda Temma; born June 11, 1995) is a Japanese football player. He plays for Kyoto Sanga FC.

== Career ==
Temma Matsuda joined J2 League club Shonan Bellmare in 2017. After being promoted to J1 League for the 2018 season, he scored his first goal as an equalizer against Kawasaki Frontale for an eventual 1–1 draw.

== Career statistics ==
Updated to 18 February 2019.

Appearances and goals by club, season and competition
Club	Season	League			Emperor's Cup		J.League Cup		Total	
Club	Season	Division	Apps	Goals	Apps	Goals	Apps	Goals	Apps	Goals
Shonan Bellmare	2017	J2 League	3	0	0	0	—		3	0
Shonan Bellmare	2018	J1 League	21	1	2	0	7	1	30	2
Career total			24	1	2	0	7	1	33	2
