= João Pedro (footballer, born 1999) =

Brazilian footballer

João Pedro Mendes Santos
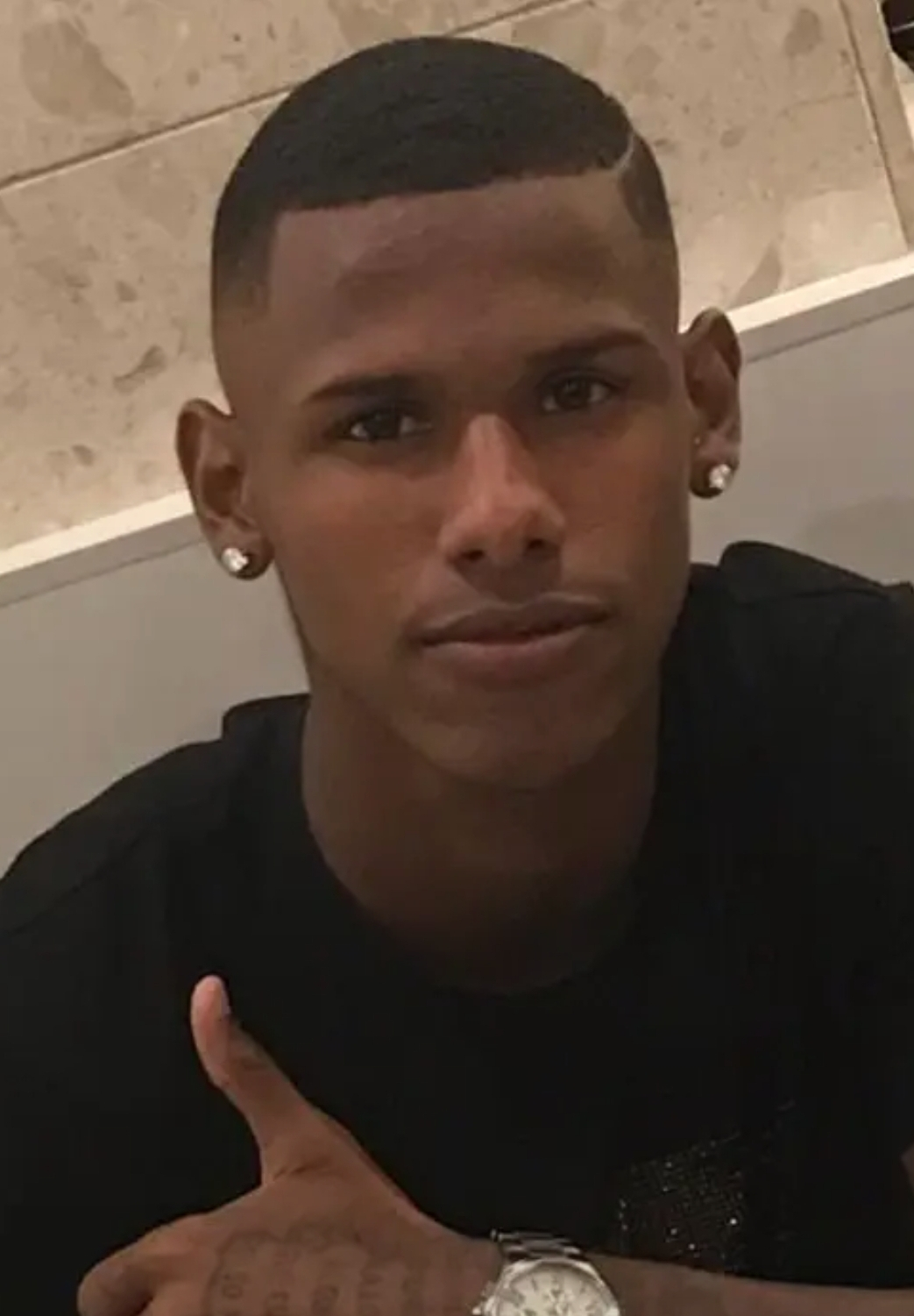

Personal information
- Date of birth: 3 September 1999 (age 27)
- Place of birth: Diadema, Brazil
- Height: 1.85 m (6 ft 1 in)
- Position: Defensive midfielder

Team information
- Current team: Kyoto Sanga
- Number: 6

Youth career
- 2009–2014: São Paulo
- 2014–2015: Red Bull Brasil
- 2016: Água Santa
- 2017–2019: Santo André

Senior career*
| Years | Team | Apps | (Gls) |
| 2019–2020 | Santo André | 0 | (0) |
| 2020–2021 | Portuguesa Santista | 2 | (0) |
| 2021 | → Vitória (loan) | 29 | (0) |
| 2022– | Vitória | 26 | (0) |
| 2023 | → Brusque (loan) | 11 | (0) |
| 2023 | → Tombense (loan) | 28 | (1) |
| 2024 | → CRB (loan) | 5 | (0) |
| 2025 | → Kyoto Sanga (loan) | 23 | (1) |
| 2026– | Kyoto Sanga | 18 | (3) |
- * Club domestic league appearances and goals as of 1 August 2026

João Pedro Mendes Santos (born 3 September 1999), known as João Pedro, is a Brazilian footballer who plays for Kyoto Sanga. Mainly a defensive midfielder, he can also play as a central defender.

== Club career ==
Born in Diadema, São Paulo, João Pedro began his career with São Paulo in 2009, aged ten. Five years later, he moved to Red Bull Brasil, and subsequently represented Água Santa and Santo André as a youth.

João Pedro made his senior debut with Santo André on 13 September 2019, starting in a 2–0 Copa Paulista home win over Inter de Limeira. In June 2020, he moved to Portuguesa Santista, and scored his first goal on 11 November of that year by netting the opener in a 1–2 loss at São Bernardo.

On 15 February 2021, João Pedro was loaned to Série B side Vitória, with a buyout clause. He made his club debut two days later, starting in a 3–3 Campeonato Baiano away draw against UNIRB.

On 2 December 2021, despite suffering team relegation, Vitória exercised the buyout clause on João Pedro's contract, and he signed a contract with the club until 2024.

On 27 November 2024, Vitória loaned the player to a Japanese team Kyoto Sanga, with a buyout clause, for playing the year of 2025.

== Career statistics ==
As of 27 February 2024

| Club | Season | League | | | State League | | Cup | | Continental | | Other | | Total | |
| Club | Season | Division | Apps | Goals | Apps | Goals | Apps | Goals | Apps | Goals | Apps | Goals | Apps | Goals |
|---|---|---|---|---|---|---|---|---|---|---|---|---|---|---|
| Santo André | 2019 | Paulista A2 | — | | 0 | 0 | — | | — | | 5 (Note: Appearance(s) in Copa Paulista) | 0 | 5 | 0 |
| Portuguesa Santista | 2020 | Paulista A2 | — | | 2 | 0 | — | | — | | 7 | 1 | 9 | 1 |
| Vitória | 2021 | Série B | 21 | 0 | 8 | 0 | 4 | 0 | — | | 10 (Note: Appearance(s) in Copa do Nordeste) | 0 | 43 | 0 |
| Vitória | 2022 | Série C | 16 | 0 | 9 | 0 | 3 | 0 | — | | — | | 28 | 0 |
| Vitória | 2023 | Série B | 0 | 0 | 1 | 0 | — | | — | | 2 | 0 | 3 | 0 |
| Vitória | Total | | 37 | 0 | 18 | 0 | 7 | 0 | — | | 12 | 0 | 74 | 0 |
| Brusque (loan) | 2023 | Série C | 0 | 0 | 11 | 0 | 2 | 0 | — | | — | | 13 | 0 |
| Tombense (loan) | 2023 | Série B | 28 | 1 | — | | — | | — | | — | | 28 | 1 |
| CRB (loan) | 2024 | Série B | 0 | 0 | 5 | 0 | 0 | 0 | — | | 3 | 0 | 8 | 0 |
| Kyoto Sanga (loan) | 2025 | J-League | 0 | 0 | 0 | 0 | 0 | 0 | — | | 5 | 0 | 0 | 1 |
| Career total | | | 65 | 1 | 36 | 0 | 9 | 0 | 0 | 0 | 28 | 1 | 137 | 3 |
