= Shimpei Fukuoka =

Japanese footballer

Shimpei Fukuoka 福岡 慎平
Personal information
- Full name: Shimpei Fukuoka
- Date of birth: June 27, 2000 (age 26)
- Place of birth: Nara, Japan
- Height: 1.70 m (5 ft 7 in)
- Position: Midfielder

Team information
- Current team: Kyoto Sanga FC
- Number: 10

Youth career
- YF Naratesoro
- –2012: Athpegas Ikoma FC
- 2013–2018: Kyoto Sanga FC

Senior career*
Years	Team	Apps	(Gls)
2018–	Kyoto Sanga FC	228	(7)
- * Club domestic league appearances and goals as of 1 August 2026

Shimpei Fukuoka (福岡 慎平, Fukuoka Shinpei; born June 27, 2000) is a Japanese football player currently plays for Kyoto Sanga FC.

== Playing career ==
Fukuoka was born in Nara Prefecture on June 27, 2000. He joined J2 League club Kyoto Sanga FC from youth team in 2018.

== Career statistics ==
Updated to 20 July 2022.

Club performance			League		Cup		League Cup		Total	
Season	Club	League	Apps	Goals	Apps	Goals	Apps	Goals	Apps	Goals
Japan			League		Emperor's Cup		League Cup		Total	
2018	Kyoto Sanga	J2 League	10	1	0	0	–		10	1
2019	Kyoto Sanga	J2 League	36	2	1	0	–		37	3
2020	Kyoto Sanga	J2 League	36	1	–		–		36	1
2021	Kyoto Sanga	J2 League	38	3	2	0	–		40	3
2022	Kyoto Sanga	J1 League	16	0	3	0	7	1	26	1
Career total			136	7	6	0	7	1	149	8
