= Sanga Stadium by Kyocera =

Stadium in Kameoka, Kyoto, Japan

- サンガスタジアム by KYOCERA
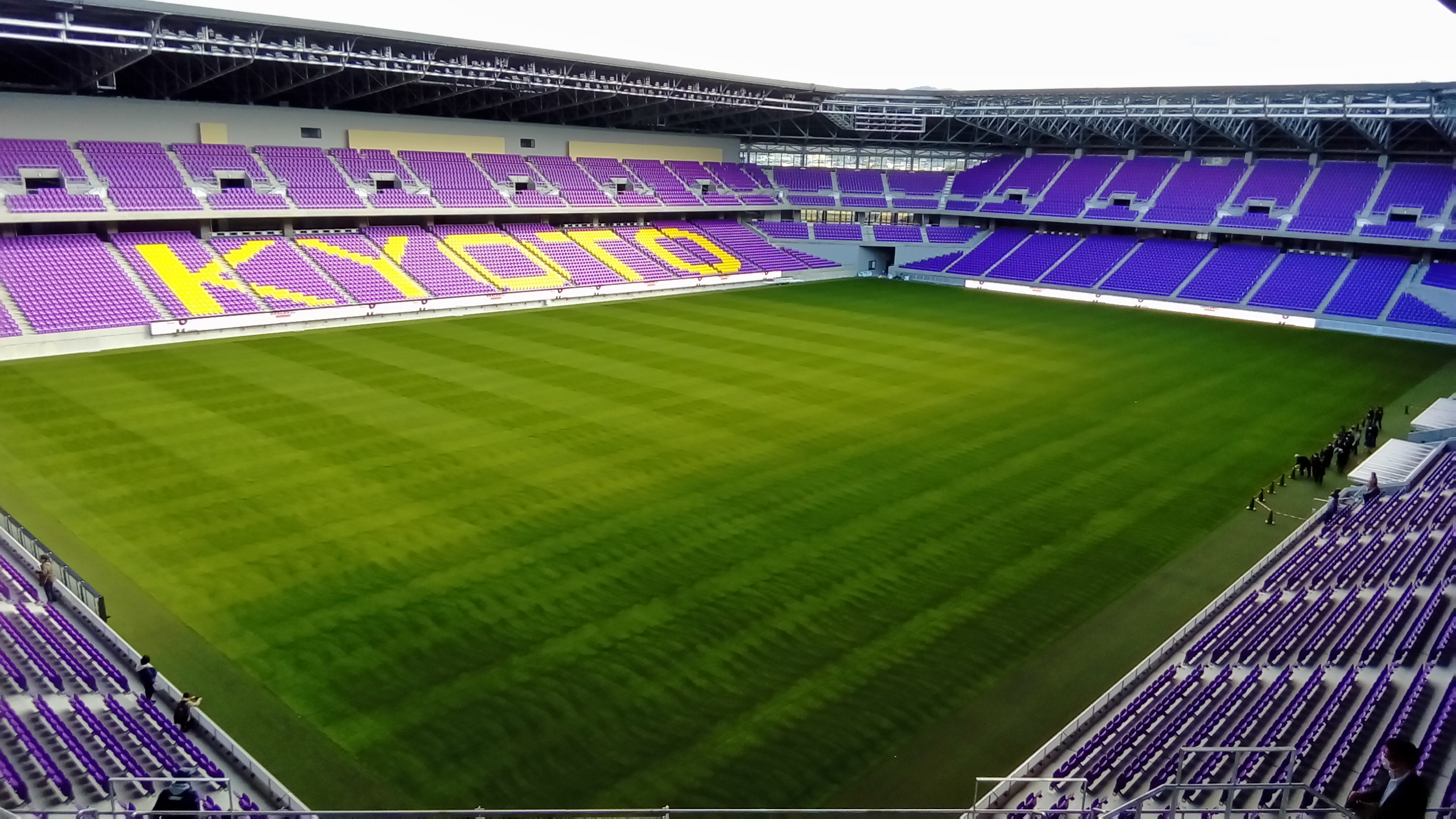
- Kyoto Stadium, January 2020

- Location in Japan Location in Kyoto Prefecture
- Interactive map of Sanga Stadium by Kyocera
- Former names: Kyoto Stadium
- Location: Kameoka, Kyoto Prefecture, Japan
- Coordinates: 35°1′1″N 135°35′5″E
- Owner: Kyoto Prefecture
- Operator: VIVA & Sanga
- Capacity: 21,600
- Executive suites: 16
- Surface: Grass
- Field size: 126 × 84 m
- Field shape: Rectangular
- Acreage: 8.2 acres (3.3 ha)
- Public transit: JR-E11 Sagano Line at Kameoka

Construction
- Groundbreaking: 20 January 2018; 8 years ago
- Opened: 11 January 2020; 6 years ago
- Cost: ¥16.7 billion
- Architect: Nikken Sekkei
- Structural engineers: Tohata Architects & Engineers
- General contractor: Takenaka/Kohsei/Osamura JV

Tenant
- Kyoto Sanga (2020–present)

Sanga Stadium by Kyocera (サンガスタジアム by Kyocera, Sanga sutajiamu bai kyōsera), formerly was a.k.a. Kyoto Stadium (京都スタジアム, Kyōto sutajiamu), is a stadium in Kameoka, Kyoto Prefecture, Japan. It primarily serves as the home to Kyoto Sanga F.C. of the Japan Professional Football League (J.League). It was completed in early 2020, in time for the 2020 J2 League season.

The naming rights were purchased by ceramic company Kyocera at ¥2 billion over 20 years in 2019.
