= Riku Kobayashi =

Japanese footballer

Riku Kobayashi 小林 里駆
Personal information
- Date of birth: 2 August 2001 (age 25)
- Place of birth: Tokyo, Japan
- Height: 1.74 m (5 ft 9 in)
- Position: Midfielder

Team information
- Current team: Kochi United
- Number: 15

Youth career
- ARTE Nagayama SC
- 2014–2019: FC Tokyo
- 2020–2023: Juntendo University

Senior career*
| Years | Team | Apps | (Gls) |
| 2018–2019 | FC Tokyo U-23 | 18 | (0) |
| 2024 | Giravanz Kitakyushu | 10 | (1) |
| 2025– | Kochi United | 11 | (0) |
- * Club domestic league appearances and goals as of 1 January 2026

Riku Kobayashi (小林 里駆, Kobayashi Riku; born 2 August 2001) is a Japanese footballer who play as a Midfielder and currently play for Kochi United.

== Career ==
On 31 December 2024, Kobayashi joined to J3 promoted club, Kochi United.

== Career statistics ==
=== Club ===
As of the start from 2025 season.

| Club | Season | League | | | National Cup | | League Cup | | Other | | Total | |
| Club | Season | Division | Apps | Goals | Apps | Goals | Apps | Goals | Apps | Goals | Apps | Goals |
|---|---|---|---|---|---|---|---|---|---|---|---|---|
| FC Tokyo U-23 | 2018 | J3 League | 3 | 0 | – | | – | | 0 | 0 | 3 | 0 |
| FC Tokyo U-23 | 2019 | J3 League | 15 | 0 | – | | – | | 0 | 0 | 15 | 0 |
| Juntendo University | 2021 | – | | | 2 (Note: Appearances in the Emperor's Cup) | 4 | – | | 0 | 0 | 2 | 4 |
| Giravanz Kitakyushu | 2024 | J3 League | 10 | 1 | 1 | 0 | 1 | 0 | 0 | 0 | 12 | 1 |
| Kochi United | 2025 | J3 League | 0 | 0 | 0 | 0 | 0 | 0 | 0 | 0 | 0 | 0 |
| Career total | | | 28 | 1 | 3 | 4 | 1 | 0 | 0 | 0 | 32 | 5 |
