= Fuchi Honda =

Japanese footballer

Fuchi Honda 本田 風智
Personal information
- Date of birth: 10 May 2001 (age 25)
- Place of birth: Fukuoka, Japan
- Height: 1.70 m (5 ft 7 in)
- Position: Attacking midfielder

Team information
- Current team: Kyoto Sanga
- Number: 99

Youth career
- PFTC Kitakyushu
- Sagan Tosu

Senior career*
Years	Team	Apps	(Gls)
2019–2026	Sagan Tosu	83	(12)
2026	→ Kyoto Sanga (loan)	13	(0)
2026–	Kyoto Sanga	0	(0)

International career^{‡}
2018	Japan U17	4	(0)
- Japan U19
- Japan U20
- * Club domestic league appearances and goals as of 1 August 2026 ‡ National team caps and goals as of 19:36, 13 July 2021 (UTC)

Fuchi Honda (本田 風智, Honda Fuchi; born 10 May 2001) is a Japanese footballer currently playing as an attacking midfielder for J1 League club Kyoto Sanga.

== Career statistics ==
=== Club ===
As of 20 April 2026

Appearances and goals by club, season and competition
Club	Season	League			National cup (Note: Includes Emperors Cup)		League cup (Note: Includes J.League Cup)		Total	
Club	Season	Division	Apps	Goals	Apps	Goals	Apps	Goals	Apps	Goals
Sagan Tosu	2019	J1 League	0	0	1	0	1	0	2	0
Sagan Tosu	2020	J1 League	26	3	0	0	1	0	27	3
Sagan Tosu	2021	J1 League	17	1	1	0	0	0	18	1
Sagan Tosu	2022	J1 League	24	5	1	0	3	1	28	6
Sagan Tosu	2023	J1 League	12	3	0	0	0	0	12	3
Sagan Tosu	2025	J2 League	4	0	1	0	0	0	5	0
Sagan Tosu	Total		83	12	4	0	5	1	92	13
Kyoto Sanga (loan)	2026	J1 (100)	7	0	–		–		7	0
Career total			90	12	4	0	5	1	99	13
