= Sōta Kawasaki =

Japanese footballer (born 2001)

Sōta Kawasaki 川﨑 颯太
Personal information
- Date of birth: 30 July 2001 (age 25)
- Place of birth: Kōfu, Yamanashi, Japan
- Height: 1.72 m (5 ft 8 in)
- Position: Defensive midfielder

Team information
- Current team: Mainz 05
- Number: 24

Youth career
- Fortuna SC
- 2011–2016: Ventforet Kofu
- 2017–2019: Kyoto Sanga

Senior career*
Years	Team	Apps	(Gls)
2020–2026	Kyoto Sanga	166	(13)
2025–2026	→ Mainz 05 (loan)	10	(0)
2026–	Mainz 05	0	(0)

International career^{‡}
2018	Japan U18	3	(0)
2022–2023	Japan U21	5	(0)
2022–2024	Japan U23	9	(1)
2024	Japan Olympic	3	(0)
Medal record
Men's football
Representing Japan
AFC U-23 Asian Cup
Gold medal – first place	2024 Qatar	Team
- * Club domestic league appearances and goals as of 22:24, 12 April 2026 (UTC) ‡ National team caps and goals as of 20:04, 30 July 2024 (UTC)

Sōta Kawasaki (川﨑 颯太, Kawasaki Sōta; born 30 July 2001) is a Japanese professional footballer who plays as a defensive midfielder for German Bundesliga club Mainz 05.

== Club career ==
On 9 July 2025, Kawasaki joined Mainz 05 in Germany on loan with an option to buy. In March 2026, Mainz agreed to sign Kawasaki on a permanent basis.

== International career ==
Kawasaki was called up to the Japan national team in 2023, but was an unused substitute in the friendly matches against El Salvador and Peru.

On 4 April 2024, Kawasaki was called up to the Japan U23 squad for the 2024 AFC U-23 Asian Cup.

== Career statistics ==
As of match played 27 October 2026

Appearances and goals by club, season and competition
Club	Season	League			Emperor's Cup		J.League Cup		Continental		Other		Total	
Club	Season	Division	Apps	Goals	Apps	Goals	Apps	Goals	Apps	Goals	Apps	Goals	Apps	Goals
Kyoto Sanga	2020	J2 League	16	0	0	0	—		—		0	0	16	0
Kyoto Sanga	2021	J2 League	41	3	1	0	—		—		0	0	42	3
Kyoto Sanga	2022	J1 League	28	1	0	0	3	0	—		1 (Note: Appearance(s) in J1 League relegation play-off.)	0	32	1
Kyoto Sanga	2023	J1 League	28	2	0	0	1	0	—		0	0	29	2
Kyoto Sanga	2024	J1 League	30	3	4	1	0	0	—		0	0	34	4
Kyoto Sanga	2025	J1 League	23	4	0	0	2	0	—		0	0	25	4
Kyoto Sanga	Total		166	13	6	1	6	0	—		1	0	179	14
Mainz 05 (loan)	2025–26	Bundesliga	10	0	0	0	—		7 (Note: Appearances in UEFA Conference League)	1	—		17	1
Mainz 05	2026–27	Bundesliga	0	0	1	0	—		—		—		1	0
Career total			176	13	7	1	6	0	7	1	1	0	197	15

== Honours ==
Japan U23

- AFC U-23 Asian Cup: 2024
