= Toyota Motors Higashi-Fuji FC =

Japanese football club

Toyota Motors Higashi-Fuji F.C.
- Full name: Toyota Motors Higashi-Fuji F.C.
- Founded: ?
- Dissolved: 1993
- Ground: Shizuoka, Japan

Toyota Motors Higashi-Fuji F.C. was a Japanese football club based in Shizuoka. The club has played in the former Japan Football League.
