= Seino Transportation SC =

Seino Transportation S.C.
- Full name: Seino Transportation; Soccer Club
- Founded: 1974
- Dissolved: 1998
- Ground: Gifu, Japan

Seino Transportation Soccer Club was a Japanese football club based in Gifu. The club has played in Japan Soccer League Division 2.

In 2014, Seino Transportation became one of the sponsors of the spiritual successor club, F.C. Gifu.
