= Hagoromo Club =

- Full name: Hagoromo Club
- Founded: 1948 (as Nippon Light Metal SC)
- Dissolved: 1974
- Ground: Shimizu, Shizuoka, Japan

Hagoromo Club was a Japanese football club based in Shizuoka. The club has played in Japan Soccer League Division 2.

== Club name ==
- 1948–1972 : Nippon Light Metal SC
- 1973–1974 : Hagoromo Club
