= Nagoya SC =

Japanese football club

Nagoya SC 名古屋SC
- Full name: Nagoya Soccer Club
- Founded: 1950
- Ground: Aichi, Japan
- League: Tōkai Adult Soccer League Div. 2
- 2025: 8th of 8 relegated
- Website: nagoyasc.r-cms.jp
Home colours	Away colours

Nagoya Soccer Club (名古屋サッカークラブ, Nagoya Sakkākurabu) commonly known as Nagoya SC (名古屋SC, Nagoya Esushi) is a Japanese football club based in Aichi. The club has played in Japan Soccer League Division 2. Currently play in Tōkai Adult Soccer League 2, which part of Japanese Regional Leagues.

== League history ==
League history of Nagoya Soccer Club
- 1966–1980: Tokai Regional League
- 1981: Japan Soccer League Division 2
- 1982–2001: Tokai Regional League
- 2002: Tokai Regional League 1
- 2003–2004: Tokai Regional League 2
- 2005: Tokai Regional League 1
- 2006–2009: Tokai Regional League 2
- 2010–2012: Aichi Prefectural League Division 1
- 2013: Tokai Regional League 2
- 2014: Tokai Regional League 1
- 2015–2025: Tokai Regional League 2
- 2026: Aichi Prefectural League Division 1

== Current squad ==
As of 26 April 2023. Note: Flags indicate national team as defined under FIFA eligibility rules; some limited exceptions apply. Players may hold more than one non-FIFA nationality.

No.	Pos.	Nation	Player
2	DF	JPN	Ryuta Katsumata
5	DF	JPN	Ryota Nagura
7	MF	JPN	Ryo Sakai
8	MF	JPN	Ryota Hikosaka
9	FW	JPN	Rintaro Hadate
10	MF	JPN	Koki Ito
11	FW	JPN	Shotaro Shoji
13	DF	JPN	Haruya Okochi
14	DF	JPN	Shoma Kondo
15	MF	JPN	Hitoshi Nakane
18	FW	JPN	Tatsuro Shibata
19	MF	JPN	Tappei Koike

No.	Pos.	Nation	Player
20	FW	JPN	Hayate Hada
21	MF	COL	Walter Espinosa
22	DF	NEP	Milan Thapa
23	GK	KOR	Chung I-se
24	DF	JPN	Ikuo Fukaya
27	MF	JPN	Yusaku Ohashi
30	FW	JPN	Tomoya Murase
31	DF	JPN	Tsuyoshi Ikeno
32	DF	JPN	Hikaru Tomiyama
33	DF	JPN	Hideyoshi Akita
44	GK	JPN	Masaki Imai

== Honours ==
Nagoya SC honours
Honour	No.	Years
National Sports Festival of Japan	1	1961
Tokai Regional League	3	1972, 1976, 1979
Tokai Adult Soccer Tournament	1	2012
Tokai Regional League 2	1	2013
