= Kyoto Sanga FC =

Japanese association football club

Kyoto Sanga 京都サンガ
- Full name: Kyoto Sanga Football Club
- Nickname: Sanga
- Founded: 1922; 104 years ago, as Kyoto Shiko Club (京都紫光クラブ)
- Ground: Sanga Stadium by Kyocera; Kameoka, Kyoto Prefecture, Japan
- Capacity: 21,600
- Owner(s): Kyoto Purple Sanga Co., Ltd.
- Chairman: Masaaki Ito
- Manager: Ranko Popović
- League: J1 League
- 2026: J1 League, 19th of 20
- Website: sanga-fc.jp
Home colours	Away colours

Kyoto Purple Sanga Co., Ltd.
- Type: Public
- Industry: Sports
- Founded: January 13, 1994 in Kyoto, Japan
- Key people: Hiroshi Imai (Chairman); Kazuo Inamori (Honorary President)
- Products: Football club
- Revenue: ▲¥ 2140 million (2014)
- Owners: Kyocera (55.4%); Nintendo (16.6%)

Kyoto Sanga (京都サンガ) is a Japanese professional football club based in Kyoto. The club plays in the J1 League, the top tier of football in the country. Its name "Sanga" comes from the Sanskrit word sangha, a term meaning "group" or "club" and often used to denote the Buddhist priesthood, associating the club with Kyoto's many Buddhist temples.

The club was formerly known as Kyoto Purple Sanga with "purple", the colour of the team uniforms, an imperial colour reflecting Kyoto's status as Japan's ancient imperial capital city. It was decided that, from 2007, the team will simply be known as "Kyoto Sanga". They are the oldest club competing in the J.League.

Kyoto Sanga have won two J2 League titles and one Emperor's Cup.

== History ==
The club was started as Kyoto Shiko Club, one of the few proper Japanese football clubs in the sense of being strictly dedicated to football and not being part of a company. Like Ventforet Kofu, it could not rise to a Japan Soccer League First Division dominated by company teams; in 1993, after the J.League was created, Kyoto Shiko Club, aided by funds from local new sponsors Kyocera and Nintendo, professionalized (though some players broke away and formed their own clubs, see below) and joined the former Japan Football League under the new name Kyoto Purple Sanga.

First joining the J.League in 1996, Kyoto Purple Sanga hold the dubious distinction of being the League's most relegated side, having been demoted on three occasions. Relegation to J2 League occurred at the end of the 2000, 2003 and 2006 seasons; more than any other team. The 2003 relegation happened despite having many national team players such as Park Ji-sung and Daisuke Matsui on its roster, and they eventually left for European clubs.

In December 2007, Sanga gained J1 League status for the fourth time in their history via the promotion/relegation playoff and therefore shorten its club name to Kyoto Sanga. A 0–2 home defeat to Urawa Reds on 14 November 2010 confirmed Sanga's relegation back to J2, bringing an end to their three-season spell in the top flight.

In the 2021 season, Sanga returned to J1 League after an 11-year absence and finished as runner-up. In 2022, Kyoto Sanga remained in J1 League after draw 1–1 against Roasso Kumamoto in Promotion Relegation play-offs.

=== AFC Champions League Elite debut ===
In the 2025 season, Sanga achieved their highest league placement ever finishing third in J1 League thus seeing the club qualifying to the 2026–27 AFC Champions League Elite campaign which is their first continental tournament.

== Stadium ==
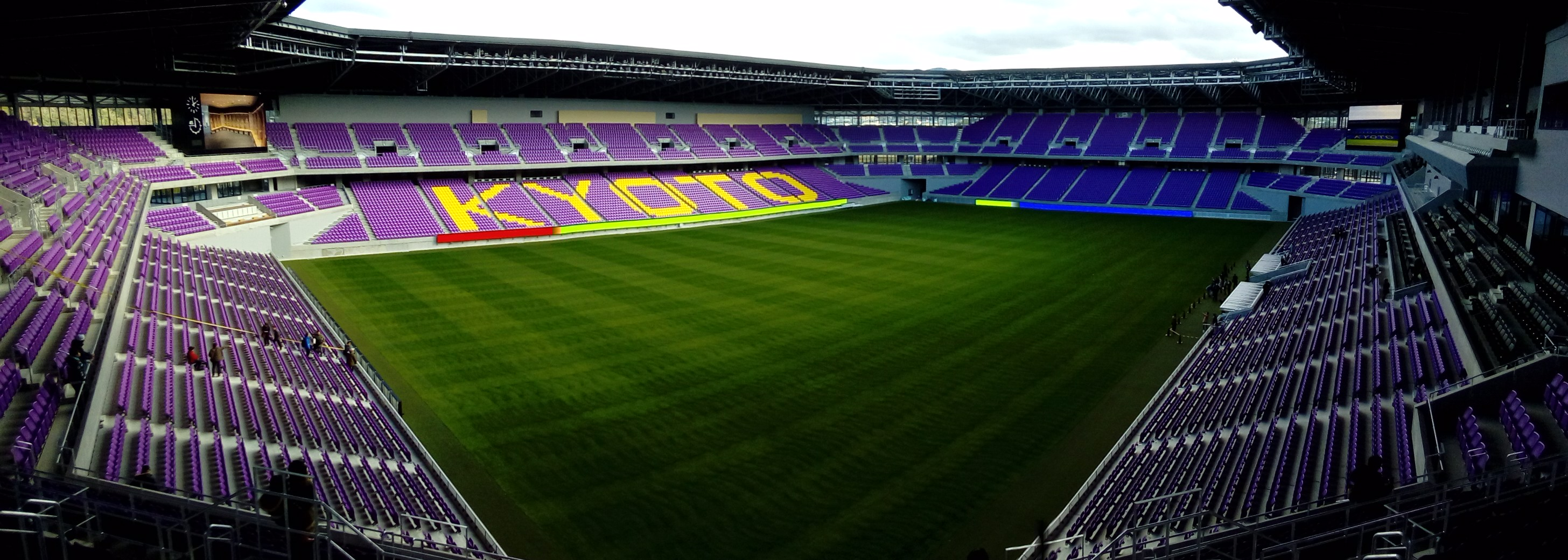
Sanga Stadium by Kyocera

=== Takebishi Stadium Kyoto ===
Kyoto Sanga played most of their home matches at the Takebishi Stadium Kyoto since their interception. The stadium holds up to 20,588 capacity and was built in 1942. In 2019, Kyoto Sanga announced plans to move to Sanga Stadium by Kyocera, a new, football-specific stadium being built in Kameoka, in time for the 2020 season .

=== Sanga Stadium by Kyocera ===
On 11 January 2020, Kyoto Sanga moved to their new stadium, the Sanga Stadium by Kyocera which is the first professional football-specific stadium in Kyoto. The naming rights were purchased by ceramic company Kyocera having signed a 20-years deal worth ¥2 billion.

== Kit suppliers and shirt sponsors ==
=== Sponsors ===
Year	Kit manufacturer	Main sponsor
1980–1992	(Germany) Puma	No sponsor
1993–1995	(Germany) Puma	(Japan) Kyocera
1996	(Japan) Mizuno	(Japan) Kyocera
1997–2002	(England) Umbro	(Japan) Kyocera
2003–2006	(Japan) Mizuno	(Japan) Kyocera
2007–2018	(Japan) Wacoal	(Japan) Kyocera
2019–present	(Germany) Puma	(Japan) Kyocera

=== Colours ===
Kyoto Sanga is considered the main continuation of the Kyoto Shiko Club that competed in the Japan Soccer League Second Division. "Shiko" (紫光) means "brilliant purple" and is the colour that Shiko/Sanga have always worn.

=== Kit evolution ===
Home Kit - 1st
1997 - 1998	1999	2000	2001 - 2002	2003 - 2004
2005 - 2006	2007 - 2008	2009 - 2010	2011 - 2012	2013
2014	2015 - 2016	2017 - 2018	2019	2020
2021	2022	2023	2024	2025 -
2026 -

Away Kit - 2nd
1997 - 1998	1999 - 2000	2001 - 2002	2003 - 2004	2005 - 2006
2007 - 2008 2nd	2007 - 2008 3rd	2009	2010	2011 - 2012
2013	2014	2015 - 2016	2017 - 2018	2019
2020	2021	2022	2023	2024
2025	2026 -			

3rd choice
2007 - 2008 3rd	2019; Club 25th Anniversary	2022; September Home Limited	2023; August Home Limited	2024; Club Founding; 30th Limited
2025; August, September Home; Limited

== Affiliated clubs ==
=== Worldwide ===
- (England) Bournemouth (2024–present)

On 15 October 2024, Kyoto Sanga announced a strategic partnership with Premier League club Bournemouth. AFC Bournemouth announced a strategic partnership with Japanese J1 League club Kyoto Sanga in October 2024 to enhance global talent identification and scouting. The collaboration focuses on sharing best practices in youth development and coaching, including training opportunities for players.

=== Local ===
- Amitie SC (Kansai Soccer League Division 1) – broke away from the original Kyoto Shiko Club upon professionalization; amateur club
- Kyoto Shiko Club (Kansai Soccer League Division 2) – broke away from Kyoto BAMB 1993 (now Kyoto Amitie) in 1998; amateur club
- Shiko Club women's (Kansai Women's Soccer League) – linked with today's Kyoto Shiko Club

== Players ==
=== First-team squad ===
As of 17 September 2026.

Note: Flags indicate national team as defined under FIFA eligibility rules; some limited exceptions apply. Players may hold more than one non-FIFA nationality.

No.	Pos.	Nation	Player
1	GK	JPN	Gakuji Ota
5	DF	JPN	Hisashi Appiah Tawiah
6	MF	BRA	João Pedro
7	MF	JPN	Masaya Okugawa
8	MF	JPN	Takuji Yonemoto
9	FW	BRA	Rafael Elias
10	MF	JPN	Shimpei Fukuoka (captain)
11	FW	BRA	Marco Túlio
14	MF	BRA	Thiago (on loan from Jacuipense)
15	DF	JPN	Kodai Nagata
16	MF	JPN	Taiyō Hiraoka
17	FW	BRA	Alex Souza
18	MF	JPN	Temma Matsuda
19	FW	BRA	David Silva
21	GK	JPN	Kentaro Kakoi
23	FW	JPN	Takumi Kato
24	MF	JPN	Hiroto Morooka
25	MF	KOR	Yoon Sung-jun
26	DF	JPN	Ren Katō
29	FW	JPN	Ko Sakai

No.	Pos.	Nation	Player
31	FW	JPN	Sora Hiraga
32	MF	JPN	Mitsuki Saito
33	DF	JPN	Sota Yamamoto ^{DSP}
34	DF	BRA	Henrique Trevisan
36	GK	JPN	Akira Fantini
38	FW	BRA	Everton Maceió (on loan from Vila Nova)
40	DF	JPN	Yusuke Ishida
41	MF	JPN	Haruto Tatsukawa ^{DSP}
43	DF	BRA	Weverton (on loan from Portuguesa)
44	MF	JPN	Kyo Sato
48	MF	JPN	Ryuma Nakano
50	DF	JPN	Yoshinori Suzuki
60	DF	JPN	Ryosuke Yamanaka
62	DF	JPN	Takaaki Shichi
77	MF	JPN	Haruki Arai
90	GK	BRA	Halls (on loan from Vila Nova)
93	FW	JPN	Shun Nagasawa
94	GK	JPN	Masaaki Murakami
99	MF	JPN	Fuchi Honda

=== Out on loan ===
Note: Flags indicate national team as defined under FIFA eligibility rules; some limited exceptions apply. Players may hold more than one non-FIFA nationality.

No.	Pos.	Nation	Player
—	DF	JPN	Yuta Ueda (on loan to JEF United Chiba)
—	DF	JPN	Shinnosuke Fukuda (on loan to (Poland) Legia Warsaw)

No.	Pos.	Nation	Player
—	DF	JPN	Rikuto Iida (on loan to (Latvia) SK Super Nova)

== Management and staff ==
As of 13 October 2026.

Position	Name
Manager	(Serbia) Ranko Popović
Head Coach	(Australia) Milan Mirić
Coach	(Japan) Yasutaka Shimizu
Coach	(Japan) Takahisa Shiraishi
Coach	(Japan) Mitsuhiro Toda
Coach	(Japan) Shuto Wakui
Coach	(Japan) Ryo Ishibashi
Goalkeeping coach	(Japan) Yasuhiro Tominaga
Goalkeeping coach	(Japan) Kenji Tanaka
Physical Coach	(Japan) Kiyomasa Komatsu
Technical Staff	(Japan) Go Kusunoki
Executive Officer	(Japan) Akira Iino
Operations Officer	(Japan) Yuzo Kawashima
Press Officer	(Japan) Shingo Ikemine

== Honours ==
Type	Honours	Titles	Season
League	J2 League	2	2001, 2005
League	Kansai Soccer League	4	1969, 1971, 1979, 1988
Cup	Emperor's Cup	1	2002
Cup	Shakaijin Cup	1	1988

== Records and statistics ==
As of 25 March 2026.

Top 10 all-time appearances
Rank	Player	Years	Club appearance
1	(Japan) Takumi Miyayoshi	2008–2015, 2019–2024	272
2	(Japan) Kazuki Teshima	1999–2009	271
3	(Japan) Jun Ando	2014–2015, 2019–2020	259
4	(Japan) Hiroki Nakayama	2004–2015	255
5	(Japan) Shimpei Fukuoka	2018–present	254
6	(Japan) Naohito Hirai	1997–2010	248
7	(Japan) Yōsuke Ishibitsu	2014–2020	236
8	(Japan) Yuki Honda	2016–2022	228
9	(Japan) Daisuke Saito	1999–2008	227
10	(Japan) Makoto Kakuda	2001–2003, 2006–2010	225

Top 10 all-time goalscorer
Rank	Player	Years	Club appearance
1	(Brazil) Paulinho	2005–2009	68
2	(Japan) Teruaki Kurobe	2000–2004	66
3	(Japan) Takumi Miyayoshi	2008–2015, 2019–2024	55
4	(Nigeria) Peter Utaka	2020–2022	52
5	(Japan) Masashi Oguro	2014–2017	49
6	(Japan) Yutaka Tahara	2002–2008	37
7	(Brazil) Rafael Elias	2025–present	34
8	(Japan) Atsushi Yanagisawa	2008–2010	27
10	(Japan) Hiroki Nakayama	2004–2015	24
10	(Japan) Kazuyoshi Miura	1999–2000	24

- Biggest wins: 10–0 vs Osaka Gas SC (26 September 1992)
- Heaviest defeats: 1–13 vs Kashiwa Reysol (23 November 2019)
- Youngest goal scorers: Takumi Miyayoshi ~ 17 years 2 months 3 days old (On 10 October 2009 vs Vertfee Yaita)
- Oldest goal scorers: Takahiro Masukawa ~ 38 years 8 months 17 days old (On 25 May 2018 vs Ventforet Kofu)
- Youngest ever debutant: Takumi Miyayoshi ~ 16 years 1 months 14 days old (On 21 September 2008 vs Gamba Osaka)
- Oldest ever player: Yukio Tsuchiya ~ 43 years 1 months 9 days old (On 9 September 2017 vs Montedio Yamagata)

== Club captains ==
- Naohiko Minobe 1994
- Makoto Sugiyama 1995
- Satoru Mochizuki 1996
- Ruy Ramos 1997
- Yuji Okuma 1997
- Hajime Moriyasu 1998
- Hisashi Kurosaki 1999
- Kazuyoshi Miura 2000
- Naoto Otake 2001
- Hiroshi Noguchi 2002
- Kiyotaka Ishimaru 2003–2004
- Daisuke Nakaharai 2005–2006
- Daisuke Saito 2007
- Yūto Satō 2008–2009
- Atsushi Yanagisawa 2010
- Diego Souza 2011
- Hiroki Nakayama 2012
- Jun Ando 2013
- Koji Yamase 2014
- Satoshi Yamaguchi 2015
- Takanori Sugeno 2016–2017
- Yuta Someya 2018
- Takumi Miyayoshi 2019
- Jun Ando (2) 2020
- Temma Matsuda 2021–2022
- Sota Kawasaki 2023–present

== Managerial history ==
Manager	Period	Honours
(Japan) Bunji Kimura	1 January 1983–30 June 1990	– 1988 Shakaijin Cup – 1988 Kansai Soccer League
(Japan) George Yonashiro	1 February 1994–31 January 1995	
(Brazil) Oscar	1 February 1995–10 June 1996	
(Japan) George Yonashiro (2)	11 June 1996–31 January 1997	
(Uruguay) Pedro Rocha	1 January 1997–31 December 1997	
(Netherlands) Hans Ooft	1 February 1998–1 June 1998	
(Japan) Hidehiko Shimizu	2 June 1998–30 June 1999	
(Japan) Shū Kamo	1 July 1999–31 May 2000	
(Germany) Gert Engels	1 June 2000–31 May 2003	– 2001 J2 League – 2002 Emperor's Cup
(Japan) Bunji Kimura	1 June 2003–30 June 2003	
(Netherlands) Pim Verbeek	1 July 2003–31 December 2003	
(Japan) Akihiro Nishimura	1 February 2004–13 June 2004	
(Japan) Kōichi Hashiratani	14 June 2004–4 October 2006	– 2005 J2 League
(Japan) Naohiko Minobe	5 October 2006–11 October 2007	
(Japan) Hisashi Katō	12 October 2007–27 July 2010	
(Japan) Yutaka Akita	27 July 2010–31 January 2011	
(Japan) Takeshi Ōki	1 February 2011–31 January 2014	
(Brazil) Valdeir Vieira	1 January 2014–18 June 2014	
(Japan) Ryōichi Kawakatsu	29 June 2014–31 January 2015	
(Japan) Masahiro Wada	1 February 2015–10 July 2015	
(Japan) Kiyotaka Ishimaru	11 July 2015–6 December 2016	
(Japan) Takanori Nunobe	1 January 2017–10 May 2018	
(North Macedonia) Boško Gjurovski	11 May 2018–31 January 2019	
(Japan) Ichizō Nakata	1 February 2019–31 January 2020	
(Japan) Noritada Saneyoshi	1 February 2020–31 January 2021	
(South Korea) Cho Kwi-jae	1 February 2021–21 May 2026	
(Japan) Tatsuma Yoshida (interim)	21 May 2026–7 June 2026	
(Serbia) Ranko Popović	8 June 2026–present	

== Season by season record ==
Champions	Runners-up	Third place	Promoted	Relegated

Season	Div.	Teams	Pos.	P	W (OTW / PKW)	D	L (OTL / PKL)	F	A	GD	Pts	Attendance/G	J.League Cup	Emperor's Cup
Kyoto Purple Sanga
1996	J1	16	16th	30	8	0	22	22	54	-32	24	9,404	Group stage	Quarter-finals
1997	J1	17	14th	32	9 (0 / 0)	-	18 (3 / 2)	40	70	-30	27	7,881	Group stage	Round of 16
1998	J1	18	13th	34	10 (4 / 1)	-	16 (3 / 0)	47	63	-16	39	8,015	Group stage	3rd round
1999	J1	16	12th	30	9 (2)	0	15 (4)	38	58	-20	31	8,859	2nd round	Round of 16
2000	J1	16	15th	30	7 (1)	2	15 (5)	39	66	-27	25	7,253	Semi-final	3rd round
2001	J2	12	1st	44	23 (5)	5	11 (0)	79	48	31	84	3,808	1st round	Round of 16
2002	J1	16	5th	30	11 (6)	1	12	44	42	2	46	10,352	Group stage	Winner
2003	J1	16	16th	30	6	5	19	28	60	-32	23	10,850	Group stage	3rd round
2004	J2	12	5th	44	19	12	13	65	53	12	69	7,807	Not eligible	4th round
2005	J2	12	1st	44	30	7	7	89	40	49	97	7,857	Not eligible	4th round
2006	J1	18	18th	34	4	10	20	38	74	-36	22	9,781	Group stage	4th round
Kyoto Sanga
2007	J2	13	3rd	48	24	14	10	80	59	21	86	6,629	Not eligible	3rd round
2008	J1	18	14th	34	11	8	15	37	46	-9	41	13,687	Group stage	Round of 16
2009	J1	18	12th	34	11	8	15	35	47	-12	41	11,126	Group stage	3rd round
2010	J1	18	17th	34	4	7	23	30	60	-30	19	10,510	Group stage	3rd round
2011	J2	20	7th	38	17	7	14	50	45	5	58	6,294	Not eligible	Runners-up
2012	J2	22	3rd	42	23	5	14	61	45	16	74	7,273	Not eligible	3rd round
2013	J2	22	3rd	42	20	10	12	68	46	22	70	7,891	Not eligible	3rd round
2014	J2	22	9th	42	14	18	10	57	52	5	60	7,520	Not eligible	3rd round
2015	J2	22	17th	42	12	14	16	45	51	-6	50	7,491	Not eligible	3rd round
2016	J2	22	5th	42	18	15	9	50	37	13	69	6,524	Not eligible	2nd round
2017	J2	22	12th	42	14	15	13	55	47	8	57	6,748	Not eligible	2nd round
2018	J2	22	19th	42	12	7	23	40	58	-18	43	5,663	Not eligible	3rd round
2019	J2	22	8th	42	19	11	12	59	56	3	68	7,850	Not eligible	2nd round
2020 †	J2	22	8th	42	16	11	15	47	45	2	59	2,924	Not eligible	Did not qualify
2021 †	J2	22	2nd	42	24	12	6	59	31	28	84	5,207	Not eligible	Round of 16
2022	J1	18	16th	34	8	12	14	30	38	-8	36	11,692	Play-off stage	Semi-finals
2023	J1	18	13th	34	12	4	18	40	45	-5	40	12,141	Group stage	2nd round
2024	J1	20	14th	38	12	11	15	43	55	-12	47	13,535	2nd round	Semi-finals
2025	J1	20	3rd	38	19	11	8	62	40	22	68	16,475	3rd round	4th round
2026	J1	10	TBD	18									N/A	N/A
2026–27	J1	20	TBD	38									TBD	TBD

Key

- Pos. = Position in league; P = Games played; W = Games won; D = Games drawn; L = Games lost; F = Goals scored; A = Goals conceded; GD = Goals difference; Pts = Points gained
- OTW / PKW = Overtime wins / Penalty kicks wins 1997 & 1998 seasons - 1999, 2000, 2001 & 2002 Overtime wins only
- OTL / PKL = Overtime losses / Penalty kicks losses 1997 and 1998 seasons - 1999, 2000 & 2001 Overtime losses only
- 3 points for a win; 2 points for an overtime win (OTW), 1 point for a penalty kick win (PKW); 1 point for a drawn game.
- Attendance/G = Average home league attendance
- † 2020 & 2021 seasons attendances reduced by COVID-19 worldwide pandemic
- Source: J.League Data Site

== Continental record ==
Season	Competition	Round	Club	Home	Away	Aggregate
2026–27	AFC Champions League Elite	League stage	(South Korea) Daejeon Hana Citizen	—N/a	0–1	
2026–27	AFC Champions League Elite	League stage	(Thailand) Ratchaburi	1–0	—N/a	
2026–27	AFC Champions League Elite	League stage	(Australia) Newcastle Jets	5–2	—N/a	
2026–27	AFC Champions League Elite	League stage	(Vietnam) Công An Hà Nội	—N/a	0–0	
2026–27	AFC Champions League Elite	League stage	(South Korea) Pohang Steelers		—N/a	
2026–27	AFC Champions League Elite	League stage	(Thailand) Buriram United	—N/a		
2026–27	AFC Champions League Elite	League stage	(South Korea) Jeonbuk Hyundai Motors		—N/a	
2026–27	AFC Champions League Elite	League stage	(Thailand) Port	—N/a		

== League history ==
- Kansai Soccer League: 1966–1971 (as Kyoto Shiko Club)
- Division 2 (JSL Division 2): 1972–1978 (as Kyoto Shiko Club)
- Kansai Soccer League: 1979–1988 (as Kyoto Shiko Club)
- Division 2 (JSL Division 2): 1989–1991 (as Kyoto Shiko Club)
- Division 3 (Old JFL Division 2): 1992 (as Kyoto Shiko Club)
- Division 2 (Old JFL Division 1): 1993–1995 (as Kyoto Shiko Club 1993; Kyoto Purple Sanga afterwards)
- Division 1 (J1 League): 1996–2000 (as Kyoto Purple Sanga)
- Division 2 (J2 League): 2001 (as Kyoto Purple Sanga)
- Division 1 (J1 League): 2002–2003 (as Kyoto Purple Sanga)
- Division 2 (J2 League): 2004–2005 (as Kyoto Purple Sanga)
- Division 1 (J1 League): 2006 (as Kyoto Purple Sanga)
- Division 2 (J2 League): 2007
- Division 1 (J1 League): 2008–2010
- Division 2 (J2 League): 2011–2021
- Division 1 (J1 League): 2022–present

(As of 2025): 15 seasons in the top tier, 28 seasons in the second tier, 1 season in the third tier and 16 seasons in the Regional Leagues.
