= Cosmo Oil Yokkaichi FC =

Cosmo Oil Yokkaichi F.C.
- Full name: Cosmo Oil Yokkaichi F.C.
- Founded: 1954 (as Daikyo Oil SC)
- Dissolved: 1996
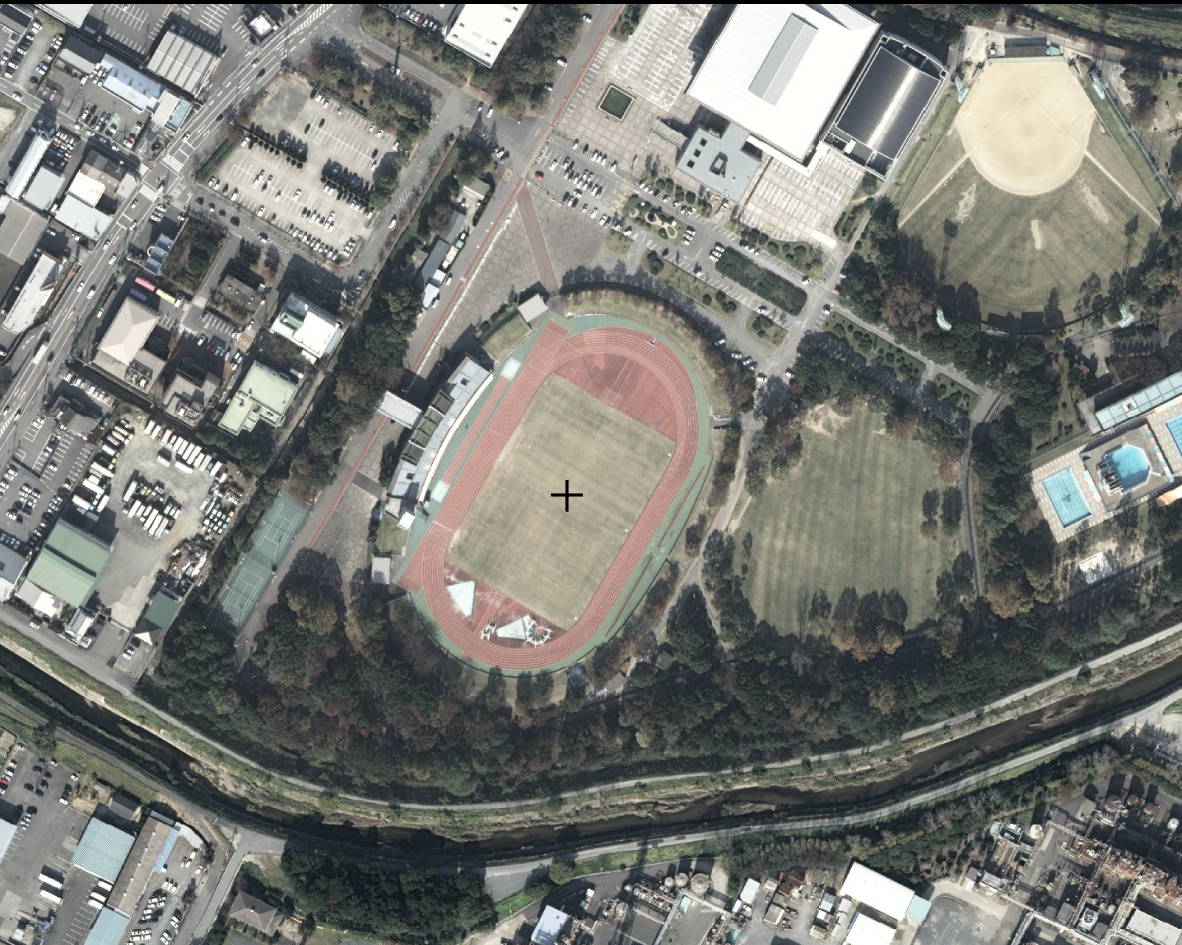
- Ground: Yokkaichi Athletic Stadium, Mie, Japan
- Capacity: 10,000

Cosmo Oil Yokkaichi F.C. was a Japanese football club based in Mie. The club has played in Japan Soccer League Division 2 and in the former Japan Football League.

== Club name ==
- 1954–1983: Daikyo Oil SC
- 1984–1986: Cosmo Daikyo SC
- 1986–1995: Cosmo Oil SC
- 1996: Cosmo Oil Yokkaichi FC

== See also ==
- Veertien Mie, successor representative (and sponsored by Cosmo Oil)
