= List of winners of J3 League and predecessors =

Japanese League (3rd tier)
- Country: Japan
- Founded: 1992
- Number of teams: 20 (2025)
- Current champions: Tochigi City (2025)
- Most successful club: Honda FC (5 titles)

A national third tier of Japanese league football was first established in 1992, as the second division of former Japan Football League, though it only lasted for two seasons. In 1999, following the establishment of J.League Division 2, a new Japan Football League was created, fulfilling the third tier until a fully professional J3 League was launched in 2014.

== (former) Japan Football League Division 2 (1992–1993) ==
The old Japan Football League was established simultaneously with creation of J.League and was initially a two-level tournament but that lasted only for two inaugural seasons.

| Season | Champions | Runners-up |
|---|---|---|
| 1992 | Chuo Bohan | Kyoto Shiko |
| 1993 | Honda Motors | PJM Futures |

== Japan Football League (JFL) (1999–2013) ==
With the establishment of J.League Division 2, the new Japan Football League was automatically moved a tier down the pyramid comparing to its discontinued namesake.

| Season | Champions | Runners-up | (Also) promoted |
|---|---|---|---|
| 1999 | Yokohama FC^{†} | Honda Motors^{†} | Mito HollyHock (3rd) |
| 2000 | Yokohama FC (2) | Honda Motors^{†} | |
| 2001 | Honda Motors (2)^{†} | Otsuka Pharmaceutical^{†} | |
| 2002 | Honda Motors (3)^{†} | Sagawa Express Tokyo^{†} | |
| 2003 | Otsuka Pharmaceutical^{†} | Honda FC^{†} | |
| 2004 | Otsuka Pharmaceutical (2) | Honda FC^{†} | Thespa Kusatsu (3rd) |
| 2005 | Ehime FC | YKK AP^{†} | |
| 2006 | Honda FC (4)^{†} | Sagawa Express Tokyo^{†} | |
| 2007 | Sagawa Express^{†} | Rosso Kumamoto | FC Gifu (3rd) |
| 2008 | Honda FC (5)^{†} | Tochigi SC | Kataller Toyama (3rd); Fagiano Okayama (4th) |
| 2009 | Sagawa Shiga (2)^{†} | Yokogawa Musashino^{†} | New Wave Kitakyushu (4th) |
| 2010 | Gainare Tottori | Sagawa Shiga^{†} | |
| 2011 | Sagawa Shiga (3)^{†} | Nagano Parceiro^{†} | Machida Zelvia (3rd); Matsumoto Yamaga (4th) |
| 2012 | V-Varen Nagasaki | Nagano Parceiro^{†} | |
| 2013 | Nagano Parceiro^{†} | Kamatamare Sanuki | |

^{†}Not promoted to J2
For additional promoted teams, the number in parentheses indicates their position after the end of the season.

== J3 League (2014–present) ==
In 2014, J. League launched a fully professional third division.

| Season | Champions | Runners-up | Playoff Winners |
|---|---|---|---|
| 2014 | Zweigen Kanazawa | Nagano Parceiro^{‡} | |
| 2015 | Renofa Yamaguchi | Machida Zelvia | |
| 2016 | Oita Trinita | Tochigi SC^{‡} | |
| 2017 | Blaublitz Akita^{†} | Tochigi SC | |
| 2018 | FC Ryukyu | Kagoshima United | |
| 2019 | Giravanz Kitakyushu | Thespakusatsu Gunma | |
| 2020 | Blaublitz Akita (2) | SC Sagamihara | |
| 2021 | Roasso Kumamoto | Iwate Grulla Morioka | |
| 2022 | Iwaki FC | Fujieda MYFC | |
| 2023 | Ehime FC (2) | Kagoshima United | |
| 2024 | RB Omiya Ardija | FC Imabari | Kataller Toyama (3rd) |
| 2025 | Tochigi City | Vanraure Hachinohe | Tegevajaro Miyazaki (4th) |

^{†} Not promoted to J2.
^{‡} Not promoted to J2 due to a loss in the Promotion/Relegation series.
For play-off winners, the number in parentheses indicates their position after the end of the season.

== Total wins ==
Clubs in bold compete in J3 as of 2026-27 season. Clubs in italic no longer exist.
Years in italic indicate seasons of amateur football (former and new Japan Football League).

| Club | Winners | Runners-up | Winning seasons | Runners-up seasons |
|---|---|---|---|---|
| Honda FC | 5 | 4 | 1993, 2001, 2002, 2006, 2008 | 1999, 2000, 2003, 2004 |
| Sagawa Shiga | 3 | 1 | 2007, 2009, 2011 | 2010 |
| Tokushima Vortis | 2 | 1 | 2003, 2004 | 2001 |
| Yokohama FC | 2 | 0 | 1999, 2000 | — |
| **Ehime FC** | 2 | 0 | 2005, 2023 | — |
| Blaublitz Akita | 2 | 0 | 2017, 2020 | — |
| **Nagano Parceiro** | 1 | 3 | 2013 | 2011, 2012, 2014 |
| Roasso Kumamoto | 1 | 1 | 2021 | 2007 |
| Avispa Fukuoka | 1 | 0 | 1992 | — |
| **Gainare Tottori** | 1 | 0 | 2010 | — |
| V-Varen Nagasaki | 1 | 0 | 2012 | — |
| **Zweigen Kanazawa** | 1 | 0 | 2014 | — |
| **Renofa Yamaguchi** | 1 | 0 | 2015 | — |
| Oita Trinita | 1 | 0 | 2016 | — |
| **FC Ryukyu** | 1 | 0 | 2018 | — |
| **Giravanz Kitakyushu** | 1 | 0 | 2019 | — |
| Iwaki FC | 1 | 0 | 2022 | — |
| Omiya Ardija | 1 | 0 | 2024 | — |
| Tochigi City FC | 1 | 0 | 2025 | — |
| **Tochigi SC** | 0 | 3 | — | 2008, 2016, 2017 |
| Sagawa Express Tokyo | 0 | 2 | — | 2002, 2006 |
| **Kagoshima United** | 0 | 2 | — | 2018, 2023 |
| Kyoto Sanga | 0 | 1 | — | 1992 |
| Tosu Futures | 0 | 1 | — | 1993 |
| YKK AP | 0 | 1 | — | 2005 |
| Yokogawa Musashino | 0 | 1 | — | 2009 |
| **Kamatamare Sanuki** | 0 | 1 | — | 2013 |
| Machida Zelvia | 0 | 1 | — | 2015 |
| **Thespa Gunma** | 0 | 1 | — | 2019 |
| **SC Sagamihara** | 0 | 1 | — | 2020 |
| Iwate Grulla Morioka | 0 | 1 | — | 2021 |
| Fujieda MyFC | 0 | 1 | — | 2022 |
| FC Imabari | 0 | 1 | — | 2024 |
| Vanraure Hachinohe | 0 | 1 | — | 2025 |

== See also ==
- Japan Football League (1992–98)
- Japan Football League
- J3 League
- List of Japanese football champions
- List of winners of J2 League and predecessors

== Sources ==
- Contents of Domestic Competition of Football in Japan
