= 2004 Japan Football League =

Japan Football League
- Season: 2004
- Dates: 28 March – 5 December
- Champions: Otsuka Pharmaceuticals; 2nd JFL title 2nd D3 title
- Promoted: Otsuka Pharmaceuticals; Thespa Kusatsu
- Relegated: Kokushikan University (expelled by JFA)
- Matches played: 239
- Goals scored: 746 (3.12 per match)
- Top goalscorer: Takehiro Hayashi (21 goal total)
- Highest attendance: 13,743 (Round 27, Thespa vs. Otsuka)
- Lowest attendance: 85 (Round 23, Kokushikan vs. Tottori)
- Average attendance: 1,141

The 2004 Japan Football League (Japanese: 第6回日本フットボールリーグ, Hepburn: Dai Rokkai Nihon Futtobōru Rīgu) was the sixth season of the Japan Football League, the third tier of the Japanese football league system.

== Overview ==
2004 JFL teams

It was contested by 16 teams, and Otsuka Pharmaceuticals won the championship.

== Table ==
| Pos | Team | Pld | W | D | L | GF | GA | GD | Pts | Promotion or relegation |
|---|---|---|---|---|---|---|---|---|---|---|
| 1 | Otsuka Pharmaceuticals (Note: One of three clubs that occupied top 3 places at the end of the first half of the season (15th week) and were seeded for 2004 Emperor's Cup. These clubs were automatically qualified for the tournament, while each of other JFL clubs had to go through the prefectural qualifier.) (C, P) | 30 | 25 | 3 | 2 | 74 | 20 | +54 | 78 | Promotion to 2005 J. League Division 2 |
| 2 | Honda FC | 30 | 19 | 5 | 6 | 64 | 36 | +28 | 62 | |
| 3 | Thespa Kusatsu (P) | 30 | 19 | 5 | 6 | 63 | 35 | +28 | 62 | Promotion to 2005 J. League Division 2 |
| 4 | YKK AP | 30 | 15 | 5 | 10 | 56 | 33 | +23 | 50 | |
| 5 | Ehime FC | 30 | 14 | 7 | 9 | 53 | 42 | +11 | 49 | |
| 6 | Sony Sendai | 30 | 13 | 8 | 9 | 50 | 42 | +8 | 47 | |
| 7 | Sagawa Express Tokyo | 30 | 13 | 5 | 12 | 43 | 39 | +4 | 44 | |
| 8 | Gunma Horikoshi | 30 | 11 | 8 | 11 | 48 | 47 | +1 | 41 | |
| 9 | Tochigi SC | 30 | 11 | 7 | 12 | 41 | 47 | −6 | 40 | |
| 10 | ALO's Hokuriku | 30 | 10 | 7 | 13 | 46 | 52 | −6 | 37 | |
| 11 | Sagawa Express Osaka | 30 | 9 | 8 | 13 | 38 | 40 | −2 | 35 | |
| 12 | SP Kyoto | 30 | 10 | 4 | 16 | 30 | 45 | −15 | 34 | |
| 13 | Yokogawa Musashino | 30 | 8 | 8 | 14 | 41 | 51 | −10 | 32 | |
| 14 | SC Tottori | 30 | 5 | 7 | 18 | 36 | 62 | −26 | 22 | |
| 15 | Kokushikan University (R) | 30 | 5 | 5 | 20 | 37 | 73 | −36 | 20 | Expelled (Note: Expelled by Japan Football Association after 29th week because of the scandal caused by arrest of Kokushikan players for sex attack on a minor. In the remaining game against Sagawa Express Tokyo a team was awarded a default 0–3 defeat.) |
| 16 | Denso SC | 30 | 4 | 6 | 20 | 29 | 85 | −56 | 18 | |

Updated to match(es) played on December 5, 2004. Source: Japan Football League
Rules for classification: 1) points; 2) goal difference; 3) number of goals scored.
(C) Champions; (P) Promoted; (R) Relegated

== Results ==
| Home \ Away | ALO | DEN | EHI | GUH | HON | KSU | OTP | PRI | SEO | SET | SON | SPA | TOC | TOT | YKK | YMC |
|---|---|---|---|---|---|---|---|---|---|---|---|---|---|---|---|---|
| ALO's Hokuriku | | 1–2 | 1–1 | 3–1 | 1–2 | 3–3 | 0–1 | 0–0 | 0–0 | 1–2 | 1–2 | 0–3 | 0–2 | 2–0 | 3–2 | 1–1 |
| Denso SC | 0–1 | | 1–4 | 2–4 | 0–3 | 1–0 | 0–11 | 0–0 | 1–2 | 1–5 | 0–1 | 1–5 | 1–2 | 2–3 | 0–3 | 1–1 |
| Ehime FC | 2–2 | 1–3 | | 1–0 | 1–0 | 4–2 | 0–0 | 1–1 | 3–2 | 1–2 | 1–0 | 1–1 | 2–0 | 1–0 | 0–1 | 4–1 |
| Gunma Horikoshi | 3–3 | 1–1 | 2–4 | | 1–0 | 1–0 | 1–2 | 1–2 | 0–0 | 0–2 | 1–1 | 2–2 | 4–2 | 2–1 | 2–1 | 3–2 |
| Honda FC | 4–0 | 3–0 | 5–4 | 1–1 | | 3–0 | 0–2 | 3–1 | 3–2 | 3–2 | 3–1 | 3–0 | 1–1 | 3–1 | 0–2 | 4–1 |
| Kokushikan University | 1–4 | 1–1 | 1–3 | 3–2 | 1–2 | | 1–1 | 4–3 | 2–4 | 1–0 | 1–0 | 2–4 | 1–3 | 3–3 | 0–5 | 1–3 |
| Otsuka Pharmaceuticals | 4–0 | 7–1 | 2–1 | 1–0 | 1–1 | 3–1 | | 4–0 | 3–0 | 1–0 | 2–1 | 2–1 | 2–0 | 2–0 | 1–0 | 2–1 |
| SP Kyoto | 2–1 | 5–0 | 0–2 | 0–1 | 1–2 | 1–0 | 0–3 | | 2–1 | 0–3 | 2–1 | 0–1 | 0–2 | 1–0 | 2–1 | 2–1 |
| Sagawa Express Osaka | 1–2 | 1–1 | 1–0 | 1–2 | 1–2 | 2–0 | 1–3 | 0–0 | | 1–2 | 1–1 | 2–1 | 0–0 | 1–1 | 2–2 | 0–1 |
| Sagawa Express Tokyo | 1–2 | 0–4 | 2–2 | 2–1 | 0–2 | 3–0 (Note: Kokushikan University S.C. were expelled from Japan Football League after 29th week and awarded a default 0–3 defeat in the remaining game against Sagawa Express Tokyo S.C.) | 0–2 | 1–0 | 2–1 | | 0–0 | 1–0 | 4–2 | 4–1 | 1–3 | 0–2 |
| Sony Sendai | 3–2 | 2–1 | 2–1 | 1–3 | 1–1 | 4–3 | 2–3 | 1–0 | 3–2 | 2–2 | | 2–3 | 1–0 | 5–1 | 1–1 | 2–2 |
| Thespa Kusatsu | 2–1 | 3–0 | 5–2 | 1–3 | 4–2 | 5–0 | 2–0 | 1–0 | 2–1 | 0–0 | 2–2 | | 1–0 | 1–0 | 1–2 | 1–0 |
| Tochigi SC | 1–5 | 4–0 | 1–1 | 1–1 | 1–3 | 2–1 | 0–4 | 2–1 | 0–1 | 2–0 | 1–2 | 3–3 | | 2–2 | 1–4 | 1–0 |
| SC Tottori | 2–3 | 2–2 | 1–2 | 3–2 | 2–1 | 2–2 | 1–2 | 3–1 | 1–2 | 3–2 | 0–4 | 1–2 | 0–2 | | 0–2 | 1–3 |
| YKK AP | 2–0 | 3–1 | 2–1 | 2–2 | 2–3 | 0–2 | 3–0 | 4–1 | 0–1 | 1–0 | 0–1 | 2–3 | 0–1 | 1–1 | | 2–2 |
| Yokogawa Musashino | 2–3 | 6–1 | 1–2 | 2–1 | 1–1 | 1–0 | 2–3 | 1–2 | 0–4 | 0–0 | 2–1 | 0–3 | 2–2 | 0–0 | 0–3 | |

Updated to match(es) played on December 5, 2004. Source: JFL First Round, JFL Second Round
Legend: Blue = home team win; Yellow = draw; Red = away team win.

== Top scorers ==
| Rank | Scorer | Club | Goals |
|---|---|---|---|
| 1 | (Japan) Takehiro Hayashi | Otsuka Pharmaceuticals | 21 |
| 2 | (Japan) Yasuaki Oshima | Otsuka Pharmaceuticals | 20 |
| 3 | (Japan) Koji Murayama | Yokogawa Musashino | 18 |
| 3 | (Japan) Junya Nitta | Honda FC | 18 |
| 5 | (Japan) Mitsuru Hasegawa | YKK AP | 16 |
| 5 | (Japan) Toshiro Tomochika | Ehime FC | 16 |
| 7 | (Japan) Tatsuya Furuhashi | Honda FC | 15 |
| 8 | (Japan) Youichi Mori | Gunma Horikoshi | 14 |
| 9 | (Japan) Yosuke Kobayashi | Yokogawa Musashino | 12 |
| 9 | (Japan) Takeshi Ushibana | YKK AP | 12 |
| 9 | (Japan) Atsushi Yoshimoto | Thespa Kusatsu | 12 |

== Attendances ==
| Pos | Team | Total | High | Low | Average | Change |
|---|---|---|---|---|---|---|
| 1 | Thespa Kusatsu | 74,221 | 13,743 | 1,724 | 4,948 | n/a^{†} |
| 2 | Otsuka Pharmaceuticals | 45,697 | 9,553 | 707 | 3,046 | +290.0% |
| 3 | Ehime FC | 33,874 | 11,051 | 565 | 2,258 | +72.6% |
| 4 | Tochigi SC | 17,403 | 3,321 | 643 | 1,160 | +54.3% |
| 5 | Honda FC | 17,255 | 3,557 | 457 | 1,150 | +18.4% |
| 6 | Sagawa Express Osaka | 11,396 | 4,649 | 286 | 760 | +35.7% |
| 7 | SC Tottori | 9,539 | 1,535 | 287 | 636 | −19.2% |
| 8 | ALO's Hokuriku | 9,426 | 1,227 | 267 | 628 | +10.6% |
| 9 | Sony Sendai | 9,320 | 1,406 | 252 | 621 | −9.3% |
| 10 | Gunma Horikoshi | 9,103 | 3,003 | 289 | 607 | n/a^{†} |
| 11 | YKK AP | 8,915 | 1,516 | 282 | 594 | +11.2% |
| 12 | Yokogawa Musashino | 8,645 | 988 | 350 | 576 | +30.6% |
| 13 | Sagawa Express Tokyo | 5,247 | 885 | 202 | 375 | +28.0% |
| 14 | SP Kyoto | 5,596 | 585 | 106 | 373 | +38.7% |
| 15 | Denso SC | 3,694 | 583 | 126 | 246 | −14.6% |
| 16 | Kokushikan University | 3,277 | 527 | 85 | 218 | −4.8% |
| | League total | 272,608 | 13,743 | 85 | 1,141 | +99.1% |

Notes:
^{†} Team played previous season in Regional Leagues.

== Promotion and relegation ==
Because of promotion of Otsuka Pharmaceuticals and Thespa Kusatsu and expulsion of Kokushikan University, no relegation has occurred. After the season, Honda Lock, Mitsubishi Motors Mizushima and Ryutsu Keizai University were promoted from Regional Leagues by the virtue of their placing in the Regional League promotion series.
