= 2001 Japan Football League =

Japan Football League
- Season: 2001
- Dates: 1 April – 18 November
- Champions: Honda Motors; 1st JFL title 2nd D3 title
- Promoted: none
- Matches played: 240
- Goals scored: 779 (3.25 per match)
- Top goalscorer: Takaaki Tokushige (25 goals total)
- Highest attendance: 3,305 (Round 28, Honda vs. Kyoken)
- Lowest attendance: 48 (Round 23, Express vs. Sangyo)
- Average attendance: 515

The 2001 Japan Football League (Japanese: 第3回日本フットボールリーグ, Hepburn: Dai San-kai Nihon Futtobōru Rīgu) was the third season of the Japan Football League, the third tier of the Japanese football league system.

== Overview ==
2001 JFL teams

It was contested by 16 teams, and Honda Motors won the championship. No promotion or relegation took place due to the promotion-eligible teams not being autonomous clubs fit for the J. League, and at the other end of the table, due to the expansion of the league from 16 to 18 teams.

== Table ==
Pos	Team	Pld	W	D	L	GF	GA	GD	Pts
1	Honda Motor (Note: Occupied one of the top two places at the end of the first half of the season (15th week) and were seeded for 2001 Emperor's Cup. These clubs were automatically qualified for the tournament, while each of other JFL clubs had to go through the prefectural qualifier.) (C)	30	22	5	3	74	19	+55	71
2	Otsuka Pharmaceuticals	30	21	5	4	78	35	+43	68
3	Jatco SC	30	20	5	5	65	36	+29	65
4	Sagawa Express	30	19	5	6	60	23	+37	62
5	Denso SC	30	17	3	10	70	54	+16	54
6	YKK FC	30	15	5	10	53	39	+14	50
7	Yokogawa FC	30	12	5	13	37	54	−17	41
8	NTT West Kumamoto	30	10	7	13	55	62	−7	37
9	Shizuoka Sangyo University	30	11	4	15	41	59	−18	37
10	Kokushikan University	30	10	6	14	47	53	−6	36
11	Kyoken Kyoto	30	9	7	14	39	46	−7	34
12	Ehime FC	30	9	6	15	39	43	−4	33
13	Tochigi SC	30	9	5	16	28	46	−18	32
14	Sony Sendai	30	9	5	16	28	46	−18	32
15	ALO's Hokuriku	30	4	7	19	28	57	−29	19
16	SC Tottori	30	2	2	26	23	90	−67	8

Updated to match(es) played on November 18, 2001. Source: Japan Football League
Rules for classification: 1) points; 2) goal difference; 3) number of goals scored.
(C) Champions

== Results ==
Home \ Away	ALO	DEN	EHI	HON	JAT	KSU	KYO	NTW	OTP	SET	SON	SSU	TOC	TOT	YKK	YOK
ALO's Hokuriku		4–1	0–0	0–5	0–1	0–1	0–3	0–3	1–2	2–3	2–3	1–2	0–1	4–0	1–1	1–1
Denso SC	3–2		2–2	1–0	1–4	1–1	1–0	4–0	0–2	4–0	5–3	2–0	5–2	4–1	1–3	2–0
Ehime FC	0–0	1–2		1–0	2–3	3–2	1–2	0–4	2–3	0–1	0–1	2–2	3–1	4–0	0–2	2–3
Honda Motors	5–1	2–0	2–0		1–1	3–1	3–0	8–0	5–1	0–0	3–0	3–1	1–0	4–1	3–0	2–1
Jatco SC	1–0	0–3	2–1	0–0		3–1	3–2	5–3	3–5	3–2	6–2	0–3	2–0	4–0	2–0	2–1
Kokushikan University	2–0	4–2	0–1	1–5	0–2		4–2	1–1	0–5	0–2	2–0	6–0	2–2	3–0	0–2	0–1
Kyoken Kyoto	1–2	3–2	2–1	1–2	2–2	2–1		2–2	1–4	0–0	2–1	0–1	0–1	2–0	1–2	2–3
NTT West Kumamoto	2–0	3–4	1–2	1–2	2–2	3–1	0–0		1–6	2–1	3–0	1–2	1–2	3–0	0–3	0–1
Otsuka Pharmaceuticals	2–2	3–0	2–0	1–0	2–0	2–2	1–1	3–2		0–1	3–0	3–0	0–0	3–2	2–2	4–1
Sagawa Express	3–0	3–1	0–1	0–0	0–2	1–1	2–1	2–1	2–0		2–0	4–0	2–0	7–0	3–0	4–1
Sony Sendai	2–2	1–2	1–1	1–1	2–1	2–1	1–2	1–2	0–4	0–3		0–1	2–4	4–2	1–1	2–0
Shizuoka Sangyo University	3–0	2–5	1–0	2–4	0–2	2–2	1–1	3–3	1–3	0–5	3–4		4–0	1–0	1–2	1–2
Tochigi SC	1–0	2–4	0–0	1–2	0–2	1–2	0–1	2–2	1–2	2–1	0–3	0–1		2–1	0–1	1–0
SC Tottori	4–1	0–3	2–7	0–3	0–4	0–2	2–1	2–3	0–5	1–1	3–4	0–2	0–0		0–1	0–2
YKK FC	0–1	4–3	2–1	1–2	0–2	5–2	1–0	2–2	2–3	0–1	1–1	2–1	1–2	4–1		7–0
Yokogawa FC	1–1	2–2	0–1	1–3	1–1	0–2	2–2	1–4	3–2	1–4	1–0	2–0	1–0	2–1	2–1	

Updated to match(es) played on November 18, 2001. Source: Japan Football League
Legend: Blue = home team win; Yellow = draw; Red = away team win.

== Top scorers ==
Rank	Scorer	Club	Goals
1	(Japan) Takaaki Tokushige	Denso SC	25
2	(Japan) Yasuhiko Niimura	Jatco SC	21
3	(Japan) Takehiro Hayashi	Otsuka Pharmaceuticals	20
4	(Japan) Mitsuru Hasegawa	YKK FC	18
4	(Japan) Masao Yamamoto	Sagawa Express	18

== Attendances ==
Pos	Team	Total	High	Low	Average	Change
1	Honda Motors	13,178	3,305	402	879	−11.9%
2	SC Tottori	12,281	2,124	401	819	n/a^{†}
3	NTT West Kumamoto	10,394	1,378	324	693	n/a^{†}
4	Ehime FC	9,896	1,250	348	660	n/a^{†}
5	Tochigi SC	9,723	1,141	285	648	−38.2%
6	Otsuka Pharmaceuticals	8,975	2,391	284	598	+18.4%
7	YKK FC	8,093	2,477	198	540	n/a^{†}
8	Sony Sendai	7,817	886	342	521	−52.3%
9	Yokogawa FC	7,334	1,198	240	489	−30.4%
10	ALO's Hokuriku	6,380	1,801	180	425	−12.2%
11	Jatco SC	6,329	1,075	167	422	−36.7%
12	Sagawa Express	5,365	1,054	48	358	n/a^{†}
13	Denso SC	5,344	831	119	356	−17.8%
14	Kyoken Kyoto	5,262	468	203	351	−9.1%
15	Shizuoka Sangyo University	4,013	803	101	268	−48.9%
16	Kokushikan University	3,298	414	54	220	−28.3%
	League total	123,682	3,305	48	515	−42.8%

Notes:
^{†} Team played previous season in Regional Leagues.

== Promotion and relegation ==
No relegation has occurred due to expansion of the league to 18 teams. At the end of the season, the winner and runner-up of the Regional League promotion series, Sagawa Express Osaka and Profesor Miyazaki were promoted automatically.
