= Mitsuru Hasegawa =

Japanese footballer

Personal information
- Full name: Mitsuru Hasegawa
- Date of birth: February 3, 1979 (age 47)
- Place of birth: Fukui, Japan
- Height: 1.81 m (5 ft 11 1/2 in)
- Position: Forward

Youth career
- 1997–2000: Meiji University

Senior career*
Years	Team	Apps	(Gls)
2001–2010	Kataller Toyama	246	(105)
Total		246	(105)
- * Club domestic league appearances and goals

Mitsuru Hasegawa (長谷川 満, Hasegawa Mitsuru; born February 3, 1979) is a former Japanese football player.

== Club statistics ==
Club performance			League		Cup		Total	
Season	Club	League	Apps	Goals	Apps	Goals	Apps	Goals
Japan			League		Emperor's Cup		Total	
2001	YKK	Football League	30	18	-		30	18
2002	YKK	Football League	16	7			16	7
2003	YKK	Football League	28	12	-		28	12
2004	YKK AP	Football League	30	16	-		30	16
2005	YKK AP	Football League	30	16	-		30	16
2006	YKK AP	Football League	33	11	3	2	36	13
2007	YKK AP	Football League	26	8	-		26	8
2008	Kataller Toyama	Football League	31	15	2	1	33	16
2009	Kataller Toyama	J2 League	21	2	0	0	21	2
2010	Kataller Toyama	J2 League	1	0	0	0	1	0
Country	Japan		246	105	5	3	251	108
Total			246	105	5	3	251	108
