= 2005 Japan Football League =

Japan Football League
- Season: 2005
- Dates: 27 March – 4 December
- Champions: Ehime FC; 1st JFL title 1st D3 title
- Promoted: Ehime FC
- Matches played: 240
- Goals scored: 731 (3.05 per match)
- Top goalscorer: Hirokazu Otsubo (18 goals total)
- Highest attendance: 7,726 (Round 21, Ehime vs. SE Tokyo)
- Lowest attendance: 102 (Round 27, Printing vs. SE Tokyo)
- Average attendance: 815

The 2005 Japan Football League (Japanese: 第7回日本フットボールリーグ, Hepburn: Dai Nana-kai Nihon Futtobōru Rīgu) was the seventh season of the Japan Football League, the third tier of the Japanese football league system.

== Overview ==
2005 JFL teams

It was contested by 16 teams, and Ehime FC won the championship.

Mitsubishi Motors Mizushima, Ryutsu Keizai University and Honda Lock were promoted from Regional Leagues by the virtue of their placing in the Regional League promotion series.

== Table ==
Pos	Team	Pld	W	D	L	GF	GA	GD	Pts	Promotion
1	Ehime FC (C, P)	30	21	3	6	54	26	+28	66	Promotion to 2006 J.League Division 2
2	YKK AP	30	20	4	6	63	28	+35	64	
3	ALO's Hokuriku	30	19	4	7	52	26	+26	61	
4	Tochigi SC (Note: One of two clubs that occupied top 2 places at the end of the first half of the season (15th week) and were seeded for 2005 Emperor's Cup. These clubs were automatically qualified for the tournament, while each of other JFL clubs had to go through the prefectural qualifier.)	30	16	9	5	60	32	+28	57	
5	Honda FC	30	17	5	8	59	37	+22	56	
6	Sagawa Express Tokyo	30	16	4	10	55	33	+22	52	
7	Sony Sendai	30	15	5	10	48	37	+11	50	
8	FC Horikoshi	30	15	3	12	53	40	+13	48	
9	Yokogawa Musashino	30	14	6	10	37	29	+8	48	
10	Sagawa Express Osaka	30	13	6	11	42	36	+6	45	
11	SP Kyoto	30	9	7	14	34	43	−9	34	
12	SC Tottori	30	9	6	15	40	58	−18	33	
13	Ryutsu Keizai University	30	5	7	18	39	79	−40	22	
14	Denso SC	30	4	7	19	33	63	−30	19	
15	Honda Lock	30	3	6	21	38	79	−41	15	
16	Mitsubishi Motors Mizushima	30	2	2	26	24	85	−61	8	

Updated to match(es) played on December 4, 2005. Source: Japan Football League
Rules for classification: 1) points; 2) goal difference; 3) number of goals scored.
(C) Champions; (P) Promoted

== Results ==
Home \ Away	ALO	DEN	EHI	HOR	HON	LOC	RKU	MMM	PRI	SEO	SET	SON	TOC	TOT	YKK	YMC
ALO's Hokuriku		4–2	0–1	2–1	3–2	2–1	2–2	5–0	1–0	0–1	2–2	1–3	0–0	4–0	2–1	1–0
Denso SC	0–4		0–1	0–0	0–3	1–2	0–2	1–1	0–0	0–2	0–3	0–4	0–4	2–3	1–2	0–1
Ehime FC	2–0	2–0		1–0	2–2	4–1	2–0	1–0	2–1	1–0	0–3	1–2	1–0	4–1	0–1	3–0
FC Horikoshi	0–2	0–1	1–3		2–1	1–1	5–2	6–2	1–1	2–0	2–0	3–0	3–1	4–1	2–0	0–1
Honda FC	3–2	1–1	1–3	2–1		3–1	2–1	4–0	2–0	2–1	1–3	1–1	0–0	3–0	2–2	0–1
Honda Lock	0–2	2–5	0–3	2–3	1–2		4–1	3–4	1–4	0–4	0–3	1–4	1–3	1–2	2–2	1–1
Ryutsu Keizai University	0–3	3–1	1–4	3–2	1–3	2–2		2–1	1–1	1–2	0–7	1–1	0–6	2–4	1–5	1–1
Mitsubishi Motors Mizushima	0–1	3–8	0–2	1–4	1–5	0–1	1–3		1–2	1–2	1–4	0–3	1–5	1–1	0–2	2–1
SP Kyoto	0–1	1–0	1–2	0–3	1–2	2–2	2–1	1–0		2–4	0–1	1–2	1–1	3–2	0–2	0–1
Sagawa Express Osaka	1–4	2–0	2–2	2–3	1–3	3–1	2–1	3–0	1–2		1–0	1–1	1–1	0–0	0–3	1–0
Sagawa Express Tokyo	0–1	0–2	1–0	0–1	0–2	5–1	3–1	1–0	2–2	2–1		4–0	2–2	1–0	2–1	0–1
Sony Sendai	2–0	4–0	1–2	0–1	0–1	3–1	3–3	2–0	1–0	1–0	1–2		0–3	0–0	0–4	2–0
Tochigi SC	1–1	4–4	3–2	1–0	3–2	3–2	2–1	2–1	1–2	1–0	1–1	1–0		5–0	1–2	2–3
SC Tottori	0–1	2–2	1–1	1–0	3–4	3–1	4–0	4–1	0–1	0–2	3–1	1–3	1–1		1–5	0–2
YKK AP	1–0	3–2	1–2	6–1	1–0	3–1	1–1	1–0	4–2	0–0	3–1	3–2	0–1	2–0		2–0
Yokogawa Musashino	0–1	0–0	2–0	3–1	1–0	1–1	3–1	5–1	1–1	2–2	3–1	1–2	0–1	1–2	1–0	

Updated to match(es) played on December 4, 2005. Source: JFL First Round, JFL Second Round
Legend: Blue = home team win; Yellow = draw; Red = away team win.

== Top scorers ==
Rank	Scorer	Club	Goals
1	(Japan) Hirokazu Otsubo	Sagawa Express Osaka	18
2	(Japan) Shinji Honda	Sony Sendai	17
3	(Japan) Mitsuru Hasegawa	YKK AP	16
4	(Brazil) Amaral	FC Horikoshi	15
5	(Japan) Naoki Ishibashi	ALO's Hokuriku	14
5	(Japan) Kohei Masumoto	SC Tottori	14
5	(Japan) Yoshihide Ogushi	Honda Lock	14
5	(Japan) Kodai Suzuki	Honda FC	14
5	(Japan) Manabu Wakabayashi	Tochigi SC	14
10	(Japan) Hiroki Kishida	YKK AP	13
10	(Japan) Kentaro Yoshida	Tochigi SC	13

== Attendance ==
Pos	Team	Total	High	Low	Average	Change
1	Ehime FC	42,655	7,726	1,077	2,844	+26.0%
2	Tochigi SC	22,811	3,328	745	1,521	+31.1%
3	Honda FC	16,736	3,275	654	1,116	−3.0%
4	SC Tottori	11,663	1,369	429	778	+22.3%
5	YKK AP	11,535	1,802	258	769	+29.5%
6	FC Horikoshi	10,868	2,108	246	725	+19.4%
7	Honda Lock	10,701	2,011	424	713	n/a^{†}
8	Sony Sendai	10,688	1,614	381	713	+14.8%
9	Yokogawa Musashino	10,201	1,123	448	680	+18.1%
10	Sagawa Express Osaka	10,133	4,632	142	676	−11.1%
11	ALO's Hokuriku	9,950	2,005	281	663	+5.6%
12	Mitsubishi Motors Mizushima	6,272	698	267	418	n/a^{†}
13	Sagawa Express Tokyo	5,981	1,013	107	399	+6.4%
14	Denso SC	5,464	888	154	364	+48.0%
15	SP Kyoto	5,400	630	102	360	−3.5%
16	Ryutsu Keizai University	4,651	706	113	310	n/a^{†}
	League total	195,709	7,726	102	815	−28.6%

Notes:
^{†} Team played previous season in Regional Leagues.

== Promotion and relegation ==
No relegation has occurred due to expansion of the league to 18 teams. At the end the season, FC Ryukyu, JEF Reserves and Rosso Kumamoto were promoted from Regional leagues by the virtue of their placing in the Regional League promotion series.
