= 2003 Japan Football League =

Japan Football League
- Season: 2003
- Dates: 30 March – 23 November
- Champions: Otsuka Pharmaceuticals; 1st JFL title 1st D3 title
- Promoted: none
- Relegated: Kyoto BAMB 1993; Jatco SC (folded)
- Matches played: 240
- Goals scored: 724 (3.02 per match)
- Top goalscorer: Tatsuya Furuhashi (31 goal total)
- Highest attendance: 4,123 (Round 18, SE Osaka vs. SE Tokyo)
- Lowest attendance: 83 (Round 24, Kokushikan vs. Printing)
- Average attendance: 573

The 2003 Japan Football League (Japanese: 第5回日本フットボールリーグ, Hepburn: Dai Go-kai Nihon Futtobōru Rīgu) was the fifth season of the Japan Football League, the third tier of the Japanese football league system.

== Overview ==
2003 JFL teams

It was contested by 16 teams, and Otsuka Pharmaceuticals won the championship.

== Table ==
Pos	Team	Pld	W	D	L	GF	GA	GD	Pts	Promotion or relegation
1	Otsuka Pharmaceuticals (Note: One of two clubs that occupied top 2 places at the end of the 2001 season and were seeded for 2003 Emperor's Cup. These clubs were automatically qualified for the tournament, while each of other JFL clubs had to go through the prefectural qualifier.) (C)	30	23	3	4	65	21	+44	72	
2	Honda FC	30	21	4	5	73	30	+43	67	
3	Ehime FC	30	17	5	8	55	39	+16	56	
4	Sagawa Express Osaka	30	16	6	8	48	29	+19	54	
5	Sagawa Express Tokyo	30	15	7	8	54	37	+17	52	
6	YKK FC	30	15	5	10	56	38	+18	50	
7	Jatco SC	30	15	3	12	45	44	+1	48	Folded (Note: After the season Jatco F.C. submitted the letter of resignation to the league and disbanded the team.)
8	Tochigi SC	30	12	9	9	48	35	+13	45	
9	Sony Sendai	30	13	6	11	46	44	+2	45	
10	SC Tottori	30	10	7	13	45	50	−5	37	
11	Kokushikan University	30	10	4	16	36	64	−28	34	
12	Denso SC	30	9	5	16	41	51	−10	32	
13	Yokogawa Musashino	30	9	2	19	32	65	−33	29	
14	ALO's Hokuriku	30	7	6	17	23	47	−24	27	
15	SP Kyoto	30	5	6	19	31	62	−31	21	
16	Kyoto BAMB 1993 (R)	30	2	4	24	26	68	−42	10	Promotion/relegation Series

Updated to match(es) played on November 23, 2003. Source: Japan Football League
Rules for classification: 1) points; 2) goal difference; 3) number of goals scored.
(C) Champions; (R) Relegated

== Results ==
Home \ Away	ALO	BAM	DEN	EHI	HON	JAT	KSU	OTP	PRI	SEO	SET	SON	TOC	TOT	YKK	YMC
ALO's Hokuriku		1–0	0–3	0–3	1–2	0–1	1–3	1–2	1–1	0–1	1–1	2–4	0–2	2–1	1–4	2–0
Kyoto BAMB 1993	2–0		1–1	1–2	0–2	2–0	1–2	0–3	0–3	0–2	1–2	1–3	2–5	1–2	2–2	2–3
Denso SC	3–1	2–0		1–0	2–4	0–3	2–0	0–3	1–2	1–2	1–4	3–0	2–3	1–1	1–2	1–0
Ehime FC	1–3	1–1	2–1		2–1	2–2	0–1	0–1	1–0	2–1	4–1	3–3	2–1	2–1	2–1	2–0
Honda FC	5–0	3–0	2–2	2–1		3–0	5–3	3–3	4–1	1–2	3–2	2–0	2–0	4–1	1–0	3–1
Jatco SC	2–0	1–0	1–2	1–2	2–1		4–1	0–3	1–0	1–3	3–2	1–0	2–2	0–1	0–3	3–1
Kokushikan University	1–0	2–2	2–1	1–0	0–3	5–1		0–3	2–0	1–4	2–2	1–5	0–2	1–6	0–0	1–2
Otsuka Pharmaceuticals	1–0	1–0	3–1	1–0	2–1	0–1	5–1		6–0	0–2	1–0	0–0	2–0	3–1	3–2	3–2
SP Kyoto	0–1	2–1	1–3	2–2	0–1	1–2	2–2	0–0		0–2	1–4	1–2	0–2	2–2	1–3	1–2
Sagawa Express Osaka	1–1	3–1	0–0	1–3	1–0	1–3	1–2	0–1	4–0		1–0	1–1	0–0	2–1	2–0	5–1
Sagawa Express Tokyo	2–2	3–2	3–0	2–4	0–1	1–1	2–0	3–0	0–0	1–0		3–2	0–0	3–0	2–1	0–2
Sony Sendai	1–0	4–0	2–1	2–4	0–4	2–1	2–0	1–5	2–0	1–2	1–2		1–1	0–0	1–2	2–0
Tochigi SC	0–0	5–1	3–3	1–2	1–1	0–2	3–1	0–1	3–4	2–2	1–1	0–1		1–2	1–0	2–0
SC Tottori	0–1	2–1	2–1	1–1	0–1	2–0	0–1	0–3	5–3	3–1	1–3	1–1	0–2		1–1	4–2
YKK FC	0–1	4–0	2–1	4–1	3–3	3–0	4–0	2–1	2–1	1–0	0–3	3–0	1–3	3–3		0–1
Yokogawa Musashino	0–0	2–1	2–0	1–4	0–5	1–6	1–0	0–5	1–2	1–1	1–2	0–2	0–2	3–1	2–3	

Updated to match(es) played on November 23, 2003. Source: Japan Football League
Legend: Blue = home team win; Yellow = draw; Red = away team win.

== Top scorers ==
Rank	Scorer	Club	Goals
1	(Japan) Tatsuya Furuhashi	Honda FC	31
2	(Japan) Yasuaki Oshima	Otsuka Pharmaceuticals	19
3	(Japan) Toshiro Tomochika	Ehime FC	18

== Attendance ==
Pos	Team	Total	High	Low	Average	Change
1	Ehime FC	19,615	3,284	412	1,308	+19.9%
2	Honda FC	14,569	3,385	330	971	−11.7%
3	SC Tottori	11,800	1,412	251	787	−6.3%
4	Otsuka Pharmaceuticals	11,720	1,765	223	781	−0.6%
5	Tochigi SC	11,286	1,215	454	752	−25.8%
6	Sony Sendai	10,276	1,688	259	685	−20.3%
7	ALO's Hokuriku	8,526	788	155	568	+67.1%
8	Sagawa Express Osaka	8,403	4,123	114	560	+107.4%
9	YKK FC	8,017	849	209	534	+9.2%
10	Yokogawa Musashino	6,610	777	215	441	−16.8%
11	Jatco SC	5,871	964	179	391	−12.7%
12	Kyoto BAMB 1993	4,745	423	255	316	−6.0%
13	Sagawa Express Tokyo	4,400	681	103	293	−11.2%
14	Denso SC	4,317	475	155	288	+2.1%
15	SP Kyoto	4,041	604	104	269	n/a^{†}
16	Kokushikan University	3,437	421	83	229	−24.2%
	League total	137,633	4,123	83	573	−0.2%

Notes:
^{†} Team played previous season in Regional Leagues.

== Promotion and relegation ==
Due to the Jatco team disbanding, the Regional League promotion series winner Thespa Kusatsu were promoted automatically. Runner-up Gunma Horikoshi were set to play Kyoto BAMB 1993 in the promotion and relegation series.

December 21, 2003
14:02

Gunma Horikoshi	3 – 2	Kyoto BAMB 1993
Koyama 20'; Mori 46'; Kurakawa 57'	Report	丸山 展生 18'; Ezawa 85'

Shikishima Stadium, Maebashi
Attendance: 735
Referee: 鈴木 亮哉

December 27, 2003
13:00

Kyoto BAMB 1993	0 – 5	Gunma Horikoshi
	Report	Mori 43' (pen.), 84', 89'; Kurakawa 50'; Danilo 60'

City Park Stadium Sonobe, Nantan
Attendance: 331
Referee: 鈴木 亮哉

Gunma Horikoshi won the series at 8–2 aggregate score and earned promotion to JFL. Kyoto BAMB 1993 were relegated to Kansai regional league.
