= 2006 Japan Football League =

Japan Football League
- Season: 2006
- Dates: 19 March – 3 December
- Champions: Honda FC; 3rd JFL title 4th D3 title
- Relegated: Honda Lock
- Matches played: 306
- Goals scored: 945 (3.09 per match)
- Top goalscorer: Tetsuya Okubo (26 goals total)
- Highest attendance: 8,999 (Round 7, Rosso vs. Mizushima)
- Lowest attendance: 78 (Round 24, SE Osaka vs. JEF Reserves
- Average attendance: 986

The 2006 Japan Football League (Japanese: 第8回日本フットボールリーグ, Hepburn: Dai Hachi-kai Nihon Futtobōru Rīgu) was the eighth season of the Japan Football League, the third tier of the Japanese football league system.

== Overview ==
2006 JFL teams

It was contested by 18 teams, and Honda FC won the championship.

Before the season two corporate clubs changed their names and were re-established as independent organizations. Denso SC became FC Kariya and FC Horikoshi became Arte Takasaki.

FC Ryukyu, JEF Reserves and Rosso Kumamoto were promoted from Regional leagues by the virtue of their placing in the Regional League promotion series, thus expanding the league to 18 teams.

At the J. League meeting in August, Rosso Kumamoto were approved as first J. League associate members, becoming eligible to J2 promotion. No such promotion took place because they failed to achieve at least 4th spot in the final standings.

== Table ==
Pos	Team	Pld	W	D	L	GF	GA	GD	Pts	Qualification
1	Honda FC (Note: Occupied the top place at the end of the first half of the season (17th week) and was automatically qualified for 2006 Emperor's Cup, while each of other JFL clubs had to go through the prefectural qualifier.) (C)	34	26	5	3	77	36	+41	83	
2	Sagawa Express Tokyo (M)	34	23	6	5	84	23	+61	75	Merged after the season
3	Sagawa Express Osaka (M)	34	23	3	8	68	29	+39	72	Merged after the season
4	YKK AP	34	19	10	5	68	34	+34	67	
5	Rosso Kumamoto (Note: J. League associate members, eligible to J2 promotion if they finish at least in fourth place.)	34	20	6	8	64	39	+25	66	
6	Yokogawa Musashino	34	17	9	8	58	38	+20	60	
7	Tochigi SC	34	17	9	8	50	35	+15	60	
8	ALO's Hokuriku	34	16	9	9	53	30	+23	57	
9	Sony Sendai	34	10	7	17	48	65	−17	37	
10	Arte Takasaki	34	10	7	17	36	62	−26	37	
11	SC Tottori	34	7	15	12	61	62	−1	36	
12	JEF Reserves	34	11	2	21	52	68	−16	35	
13	FC Kariya	34	8	8	18	46	63	−17	32	
14	FC Ryukyu	34	6	11	17	29	57	−28	29	
15	SP Kyoto	34	7	8	19	32	61	−29	29	
16	Ryutsu Keizai University	34	8	4	22	48	83	−35	28	
17	Mitsubishi Motors Mizushima	34	7	6	21	32	74	−42	27	
18	Honda Lock (R)	34	5	7	22	39	86	−47	22	Promotion/relegation Series

Updated to match(es) played on December 3, 2006. Source: Japan Football League
Rules for classification: 1) points; 2) goal difference; 3) number of goals scored.
(C) Champions; (M) Merged after the season; (R) Relegated

== Results ==
Home \ Away	ALO	ART	HON	LOC	JER	KAR	RKU	MMM	PRI	ROS	RYU	SEO	SET	SON	TOC	TOT	YKK	YMC
ALO's Hokuriku		0–1	1–2	4–1	1–0	2–0	1–1	4–0	3–1	1–2	0–0	0–2	3–3	4–2	2–1	0–0	2–1	2–2
Arte Takasaki	0–3		1–2	0–0	2–4	1–0	2–0	0–4	1–0	0–2	3–1	1–2	1–0	2–6	0–0	2–2	0–2	1–5
Honda FC	1–0	4–1		2–1	4–1	2–0	4–1	2–0	3–0	2–1	1–0	2–3	0–3	0–0	2–0	3–3	2–2	1–0
Honda Lock	0–5	1–1	4–6		0–3	1–1	3–1	2–1	2–3	1–5	0–1	2–1	0–1	2–6	0–1	1–1	1–2	2–3
JEF Reserves	1–2	2–1	0–3	3–1		1–3	1–2	1–2	0–3	3–1	0–1	0–1	1–3	4–1	2–2	3–4	0–3	4–1
FC Kariya	1–0	1–1	1–2	3–2	2–1		5–1	2–3	2–2	2–3	2–1	0–1	0–6	2–3	0–2	1–3	1–3	0–1
Ryutsu Keizai University	0–3	3–0	1–2	2–2	3–5	2–2		3–2	1–2	1–2	4–2	2–5	0–8	3–0	0–1	2–1	0–2	2–3
Mitsubishi Motors Mizushima	0–1	0–1	0–0	4–2	1–1	3–2	0–4		3–1	0–3	0–0	0–6	0–5	4–2	1–2	2–2	0–4	0–2
SP Kyoto	0–1	0–2	1–4	1–3	2–1	0–2	1–0	1–1		2–4	0–0	0–4	1–3	0–0	2–0	3–1	1–1	1–1
Rosso Kumamoto	2–1	3–2	1–2	2–0	1–0	3–1	0–0	4–0	0–0		3–1	1–0	2–3	3–1	0–1	1–1	2–1	2–2
FC Ryukyu	2–4	1–1	1–5	0–0	0–1	1–0	3–0	0–0	2–0	1–2		2–1	0–6	1–2	0–0	3–3	2–2	0–0
Sagawa Express Osaka	1–0	1–0	0–2	2–1	6–0	3–2	4–2	2–1	3–0	1–0	1–0		2–2	5–0	2–1	3–1	0–1	2–1
Sagawa Express Tokyo	1–0	3–1	1–1	2–0	3–0	1–1	5–1	3–0	1–0	0–1	5–0	1–0		0–1	1–2	2–0	0–0	1–2
Sony Sendai	0–0	2–1	2–3	2–3	2–4	1–1	0–2	4–0	1–1	2–1	1–0	2–1	0–1		0–4	0–0	0–3	0–2
Tochigi SC	1–2	1–2	3–2	0–0	2–1	0–0	3–1	1–0	2–1	1–3	3–2	0–2	0–0	3–2		3–2	3–0	4–0
SC Tottori	1–1	1–1	3–4	7–0	3–4	3–4	4–1	3–0	2–1	2–2	1–1	0–0	0–3	2–1	1–1		2–2	1–3
YKK AP	0–0	5–1	0–1	7–1	1–0	2–2	2–1	3–0	5–1	3–1	1–0	2–1	0–3	1–1	1–1	2–1		1–1
Yokogawa Musashino	0–0	1–2	0–1	3–0	1–0	2–0	3–1	1–0	2–0	1–1	5–0	0–0	3–4	2–1	1–1	2–0	2–3	

Updated to match(es) played on December 3, 2006. Source: JFL First Round, JFL Second Round
Legend: Blue = home team win; Yellow = draw; Red = away team win.

== Top scorers ==
Rank	Scorer	Club	Goals
1	(Japan) Tetsuya Okubo	Sagawa Express Tokyo	26
2	(Japan) Yosuke Kobayashi	Yokogawa Musashino	23
2	(Japan) Junya Nitta	Honda FC	23
4	(Japan) Yoshio Kitagawa	ALO's Hokuriku	22
5	(Japan) Sho Gokyu	Sagawa Express Osaka	21
6	(Japan) Hiroki Kishida	YKK AP	20
7	(Japan) Kodai Suzuki	Honda FC	18
8	(Japan) Hideki Uchiyama	SC Tottori	17
9	(Japan) Yutaka Takahashi	Rosso Kumamoto	15
10	(Japan) Kento Hori	Sagawa Express Tokyo	14

== Attendance ==
Pos	Team	Total	High	Low	Average	Change
1	Rosso Kumamoto	64,012	8,999	1,813	3,765	n/a^{†}
2	FC Ryukyu	54,213	4,837	927	3,189	n/a^{†}
3	Tochigi SC	36,369	6,153	1,142	2,139	+40.6%
4	SC Tottori	19,487	3,216	560	1,146	+47.3%
5	Honda FC	14,363	2,982	365	845	−24.3%
6	YKK AP	12,414	2,670	247	730	−5.1%
7	Yokogawa Musashino	11,697	1,194	403	688	+1.2%
8	Honda Lock	11,335	1,326	411	667	−6.5%
9	Sagawa Express Osaka	11,228	5,328	78	660	−2.4%
10	Sony Sendai	10,945	1,693	322	644	−9.7%
11	ALO's Hokuriku	9,920	1,536	283	584	−11.9%
12	FC Kariya	9,568	1,080	202	563	+54.7%
13	Arte Takasaki	8,197	876	208	482	−33.5%
14	Sagawa Express Tokyo	7,130	790	148	419	+5.0%
15	SP Kyoto	6,438	911	109	379	+5.3%
16	Mitsubishi Motors Mizushima	5,393	525	145	317	−24.2%
17	JEF Reserves	5,013	678	104	295	n/a^{†}
18	Ryutsu Keizai University	4,112	707	111	242	−21.9%
	League total	301,834	8,999	78	986	+21.0%

Notes:
^{†} Team played previous season in Regional Leagues.

== Promotion and relegation ==
Due to the merger of Sagawa Express teams into one club, the Regional League promotion series winners TDK SC were promoted automatically. FC Gifu were set to play Honda Lock in the promotion and relegation series.

December 17, 2006
13:00

Honda Lock	0 – 4	FC Gifu
	Report	Nakao 48'; Katagiri 63'; Kitamura 74'; Moriyama 89'

Miyazaki General Athletic Park, Miyazaki
Attendance: 1,117
Referee: Yoshirou Imamura

December 23, 2006
13:00

FC Gifu	4 – 1	Honda Lock
Katagiri 24', 61'; Kojima 82'; Ito 85' (pen.)	Report	Mizunaga 89'

Nagaragawa Stadium, Gifu
Attendance: 3,040
Referee: Itaru Hirose

F.C. Gifu won the series at 8–1 aggregate score and earned promotion to JFL. Honda Lock were relegated to Kyushu regional league.
