= 2007 Japan Football League =

Japan Football League
- Season: 2007
- Dates: 18 March – 2 December
- Champions: Sagawa Express; 1st JFL title 1st D3 title
- Promoted: Rosso Kumamoto; FC Gifu
- Matches: 306
- Goals: 872 (2.85 per match)
- Top goalscorer: Sho Gokyu (30 goals total)
- Highest attendance: 12,539 (Round 1, Tochigi vs. Ryukyu
- Lowest attendance: 101 (Round 20, Printing vs. Mizushima
- Average attendance: 1,312

The 2007 Japan Football League (Japanese: 第9回日本フットボールリーグ, Hepburn: Dai Kyū-kai Nihon Futtobōru Rīgu) was the ninth season of the Japan Football League, the third tier of the Japanese football league system.

== Overview ==
2007 JFL teams

It was contested by 18 teams, and Sagawa Express won the championship. The club was created before the season by merger of two Sagawa Express corporate clubs from Tokyo and Osaka.

SC Tottori were renamed to Gainare Tottori before the season.

TDK SC and FC Gifu were promoted from Regional leagues by the virtue of their placing in the Regional League promotion series, the former promoted automatically and the latter won the play-off series against Honda Lock.

FC Gifu, Gainare Tottori and Tochigi SC were approved as J. League associate members at the annual meeting in January.

== Table ==
Pos	Team	Pld	W	D	L	GF	GA	GD	Pts	Promotion or relegation
1	Sagawa Express (Note: Occupied the top place at the end of the first half of the season (17th week) and was automatically qualified for 2007 Emperor's Cup, while each of other JFL clubs had to go through the prefectural qualifier.) (C)	34	26	5	3	81	31	+50	83	
3	Rosso Kumamoto (Note: J. League Associate Membership) (P)	34	21	6	7	65	34	+31	69	Promotion to 2008 J. League Division 2 (Note: Must hold J. League Associate Membership, finish no less than in fourth place and pass a final inspection by J. League to be promoted.)
3	FC Gifu (P)	34	17	9	8	45	31	+14	60	Promotion to 2008 J. League Division 2
4	ALO's Hokuriku	34	16	11	7	50	35	+15	59	
5	Honda FC	34	16	10	8	61	42	+19	58	
6	YKK AP	34	16	7	11	60	53	+7	55	
7	Yokogawa Musashino	34	16	6	12	50	44	+6	54	
8	Tochigi SC	34	14	10	10	43	29	+14	52	
9	JEF Reserves	34	14	10	10	50	45	+5	52	
10	Ryutsu Keizai University	34	15	5	14	58	49	+9	50	
11	Sony Sendai	34	13	5	16	46	59	−13	44	
12	SP Kyoto	34	13	4	17	45	57	−12	43	
13	TDK SC	34	11	9	14	49	47	+2	42	
14	Gainare Tottori	34	10	9	15	42	51	−9	39	
15	Mitsubishi Motors Mizushima	34	11	2	21	36	53	−17	35	
16	FC Kariya	34	8	4	22	36	59	−23	28	
17	FC Ryukyu	34	7	6	21	38	82	−44	27	
18	Arte Takasaki	34	1	4	29	17	71	−54	7	

Updated to match(es) played on December 2, 2007. Source: Japan Football League
Rules for classification: 1) points; 2) goal difference; 3) number of goals scored.
(C) Champions; (P) Promoted

== Results ==
Home \ Away	ALO	ART	GAI	GIF	HON	JER	KAR	RKU	MMM	PRI	ROS	RYU	SEX	SON	TDK	TOC	YKK	YMC
ALO's Hokuriku		7–0	0–0	0–0	1–2	3–3	1–0	3–1	0–1	1–0	2–1	2–0	2–2	1–0	2–2	1–0	2–1	1–0
Arte Takasaki	0–0		1–0	0–2	0–1	0–4	1–1	1–3	1–3	1–2	1–2	1–2	1–4	0–1	1–2	0–1	0–1	0–1
Gainare Tottori	2–1	2–1		0–3	0–1	1–1	1–1	1–0	0–1	1–2	3–1	3–1	0–3	1–1	1–1	0–2	3–1	2–2
FC Gifu	0–0	2–0	4–2		0–1	1–2	1–0	3–0	1–0	1–3	1–1	1–0	1–3	3–2	1–0	0–2	3–3	1–1
Honda FC	2–2	2–2	1–1	0–1		4–2	1–3	0–6	2–0	4–1	2–4	4–0	2–2	2–2	4–1	2–2	3–0	3–0
JEF Reserves	2–3	2–1	2–1	1–2	2–2		2–0	0–0	1–0	2–1	0–1	1–0	0–5	3–1	3–2	0–2	1–1	0–0
FC Kariya	0–1	0–0	1–0	2–1	1–3	0–3		3–2	1–0	0–3	0–1	2–2	0–2	1–2	3–0	0–2	1–2	0–1
Ryutsu Keizai University	1–1	3–1	4–2	2–1	1–1	1–0	1–0		0–1	0–3	1–4	1–0	4–1	4–1	0–1	2–3	3–0	3–1
Mitsubishi Motors Mizushima	1–2	4–0	0–2	2–3	1–2	2–1	3–1	1–4		1–1	1–0	3–4	2–1	0–1	0–1	1–0	0–1	0–1
SP Kyoto	0–3	2–0	2–4	0–0	0–2	0–2	0–1	0–3	2–1		0–1	3–1	1–3	1–2	1–0	2–2	2–2	0–2
Rosso Kumamoto	2–0	1–0	3–2	0–1	1–1	0–1	1–0	2–1	1–1	6–3		6–0	1–1	1–1	3–0	1–0	1–2	3–2
FC Ryukyu	0–2	3–1	1–2	0–1	2–1	3–3	3–4	3–3	2–1	0–1	0–4		1–3	2–2	0–8	1–0	2–3	0–0
Sagawa Express	4–0	2–1	2–0	2–1	1–1	1–1	3–2	4–0	3–1	1–0	1–0	4–0		3–0	1–0	1–0	2–4	4–3
Sony Sendai	3–0	2–0	1–0	1–3	1–0	0–1	2–1	2–0	2–0	2–3	1–3	4–1	2–4		1–3	0–1	0–1	2–3
TDK SC	2–2	2–0	1–2	0–0	0–2	2–1	5–2	1–0	2–0	1–2	2–2	2–2	0–1	2–3		1–1	0–1	1–1
Tochigi SC	1–1	4–0	2–2	0–1	0–3	1–1	2–1	1–1	5–0	1–2	0–2	1–0	0–1	0–0	0–0		2–0	1–0
YKK AP	1–3	2–1	1–1	0–0	1–0	2–2	4–3	0–1	4–2	4–1	1–2	4–0	0–3	6–1	0–3	2–2		5–1
Yokogawa Musashino	1–0	1–0	2–0	1–1	1–0	2–0	3–1	3–2	1–2	2–1	2–3	1–2	0–3	5–0	4–1	0–2	2–0	

Updated to match(es) played on December 2, 2007. Source: JFL First Round, JFL Second Round
Legend: Blue = home team win; Yellow = draw; Red = away team win.

== Top scorers ==
Rank	Scorer	Club	Goals
1	(Japan) Sho Gokyu	Sagawa Express	30
2	(Japan) Yutaka Takahashi	Rosso Kumamoto	29
3	(Japan) Masatoshi Matsuda	TDK SC	18
4	(Japan) Hideyuki Ishida	ALO's Hokuriku	17
5	(Japan) Kodai Suzuki	Honda FC	15
5	(Japan) Yuki Muto	Ryutsu Keizai University	15
7	(Japan) Kento Hori	Sagawa Express	14
8	(Japan) Shōgo Shimada	Sagawa Express	13
9	(Japan) Takashi Harashima	Yokogawa Musashino	12
9	(Japan) Syogo Kawano	JEF Reserves	12
9	(Japan) Yuya Nagatomi	ALO's Hokuriku	12
9	(Japan) Junya Nitta	Honda FC	12
9	(Japan) Satoshi Yokoyama	Tochigi SC	12

== Attendance ==
Pos	Team	Total	High	Low	Average	Change
1	Tochigi SC	75,771	12,539	2,449	4,457	+108.4%
2	Rosso Kumamoto	60,680	6,365	1,559	3,569	−5.2%
3	FC Gifu	59,994	7,688	1,954	3,529	−13.4%^{†}
4	FC Ryukyu	41,539	4,675	1,153	2,443	−23.4%
5	Gainare Tottori	29,832	3,811	851	1,755	+53.1%
6	TDK SC	16,711	2,245	427	983	n/a^{†}
7	Sagawa Express	15,705	3,138	312	924	−14.4%^{‡}
8	YKK AP	12,669	2,646	267	745	+2.1%
9	Yokogawa Musashino	11,437	1,405	317	673	−2.2%
10	ALO's Hokuriku	11,025	2,555	130	649	+11.1%
11	Honda FC	10,894	1,328	168	641	−24.1%
12	Sony Sendai	9,841	1,411	215	579	−10.1%
13	Ryutsu Keizai University	9,541	1,505	154	561	+131.8%
14	FC Kariya	8,749	1,458	211	515	−8.5%
15	JEF Reserves	7,041	945	113	414	+40.3%
16	Arte Takasaki	6,966	1,015	177	410	−14.9%
17	SP Kyoto	6,754	772	101	397	+4.7%
18	Mitsubishi Motors Mizushima	6,291	711	204	370	+16.7%
	League total	401,440	12,539	101	1,312	+33.1%

Source: JFL First Round, JFL Second Round
Notes:
^{†} Team played previous season in Regional Leagues.
^{‡} Sagawa Express attendance is compared to the combined figure of its predecessors, Sagawa Express Tokyo and Sagawa Express Osaka.

== Promotion and relegation ==
No relegation has occurred due to a post-season merger of ALO's Hokuriku and YKK AP into one club named Kataller Toyama.

Fagiano Okayama, New Wave Kitakyushu and MIO Biwako Kusatsu were promoted to JFL from Regional leagues at the end of the season.
