= 2000 Japanese Regional Leagues =

Japanese amateur leagues football season

Japanese Regional Leagues
- Season: 2000
- Country: Japan

Statistics of Japanese Regional Leagues for the 2000 season.

== Champions list ==
| Region | Champions |
|---|---|
| Hokkaidō | Hokuden |
| Tohoku | TDK |
| Kantō | Sagawa Express Tokyo |
| Hokushin'etsu | YKK |
| Tōkai | Yazaki Valente |
| Kansai | Sagawa Express Osaka |
| Chūgoku | Tottori |
| Shikoku | Ehime |
| Kyushu | NTT Kumamoto |

== League standings ==
=== Hokkaidō ===
Division 1
| Pos | Team | Pld | W | PKW | PKL | L | GF | GA | GD | Pts |
|---|---|---|---|---|---|---|---|---|---|---|
| 1 | Hokuden (C) | 10 | 10 | 0 | 0 | 0 | 38 | 2 | +36 | 30 |
| 2 | Sapporo | 10 | 7 | 1 | 0 | 2 | 21 | 14 | +7 | 23 |
| 3 | Obihiro | 10 | 4 | 0 | 0 | 6 | 24 | 20 | +4 | 12 |
| 4 | Blackpecker Hakodate | 10 | 3 | 0 | 2 | 5 | 18 | 25 | −7 | 11 |
| 5 | Nippon Steel Muroran | 10 | 3 | 1 | 0 | 6 | 20 | 34 | −14 | 11 |
| 6 | Nippon Paper Tomakomai (R) | 10 | 1 | 0 | 0 | 9 | 8 | 34 | −26 | 3 |

Source: RSSSF
Rules for classification: 1) Points, 2) Goal difference; Drawn matches are decided by penalty shoot-out; winner obtains 2 pts, loser – 1 pt.
(C) Champion; (R) Relegated

Division 2
| Pos | Team | Pld | W | PKW | PKL | L | GF | GA | GD | Pts |
|---|---|---|---|---|---|---|---|---|---|---|
| 1 | Yuubari Barefoot (C, P) | 10 | 8 | 0 | 1 | 1 | 51 | 9 | +42 | 25 |
| 2 | Sapporo University OB | 10 | 6 | 1 | 0 | 3 | 30 | 26 | +4 | 20 |
| 3 | Erizen Maki Vankei | 10 | 5 | 0 | 0 | 5 | 24 | 30 | −6 | 15 |
| 4 | JSW Muroran | 10 | 4 | 1 | 0 | 5 | 22 | 30 | −8 | 14 |
| 5 | Chitose Bombers | 10 | 2 | 1 | 1 | 6 | 23 | 36 | −13 | 9 |
| 6 | Hakodate Mazda (R) | 10 | 2 | 0 | 1 | 7 | 18 | 37 | −19 | 7 |

Source: RSSSF
Rules for classification: 1) Points, 2) Goal difference; Drawn matches are decided by penalty shoot-out; winner obtains 2 pts, loser – 1 pt.
(C) Champion; (P) Promoted; (R) Relegated

=== Tohoku ===
Division 1
| Pos | Team | Pld | W | D | L | GF | GA | GD | Pts |
|---|---|---|---|---|---|---|---|---|---|
| 1 | TDK Akita | 14 | 11 | 2 | 1 | 41 | 11 | +30 | 35 |
| 2 | NEC Tokin | 14 | 9 | 4 | 1 | 19 | 12 | +7 | 31 |
| 3 | Aster Aomori | 14 | 6 | 4 | 4 | 36 | 27 | +9 | 22 |
| 4 | Primeiro | 14 | 5 | 5 | 4 | 24 | 17 | +7 | 20 |
| 5 | Yamagata | 14 | 4 | 3 | 7 | 27 | 33 | −6 | 15 |
| 6 | Nippon Steel Kamaishi | 14 | 4 | 3 | 7 | 13 | 20 | −7 | 15 |
| 7 | Morioka Zebra | 14 | 3 | 4 | 7 | 15 | 25 | −10 | 13 |
| 8 | Akita City Government | 14 | 1 | 1 | 12 | 9 | 39 | −30 | 4 |

Source: RSSSF

Division 2 North
| Pos | Team | Pld | W | D | L | GF | GA | GD | Pts |
|---|---|---|---|---|---|---|---|---|---|
| 1 | Hokuto Bank SC | 10 | 9 | 0 | 1 | 46 | 14 | +32 | 27 |
| 2 | Tono Club | 10 | 7 | 1 | 2 | 36 | 17 | +19 | 22 |
| 3 | Omiya | 10 | 5 | 2 | 3 | 22 | 14 | +8 | 17 |
| 4 | Akisho Club | 10 | 5 | 1 | 4 | 26 | 16 | +10 | 16 |
| 5 | Towada Kickers | 10 | 1 | 0 | 9 | 14 | 39 | −25 | 3 |
| 6 | Hachinohe Kosei | 10 | 1 | 0 | 9 | 15 | 59 | −44 | 3 |

Source: RSSSF

Division 2 South
| Pos | Team | Pld | W | D | L | GF | GA | GD | Pts |
|---|---|---|---|---|---|---|---|---|---|
| 1 | Matsushima | 10 | 7 | 1 | 2 | 37 | 12 | +25 | 22 |
| 2 | Shichigahama | 10 | 6 | 2 | 2 | 29 | 18 | +11 | 20 |
| 3 | Kirsch Tsuruoka | 9 | 6 | 1 | 2 | 21 | 15 | +6 | 19 |
| 4 | Furukawa Battery | 9 | 5 | 0 | 4 | 24 | 15 | +9 | 15 |
| 5 | NEC Yonezawa | 10 | 2 | 0 | 8 | 12 | 34 | −22 | 6 |
| 6 | Matsushita Electric Fukushima | 10 | 1 | 0 | 9 | 7 | 36 | −29 | 3 |

Source: RSSSF

=== Kantō ===
| Pos | Team | Pld | W | D | L | GF | GA | GD | Pts |
|---|---|---|---|---|---|---|---|---|---|
| 1 | Sagawa Express Tokyo | 18 | 14 | 0 | 4 | 54 | 16 | +38 | 42 |
| 2 | Ome | 18 | 13 | 1 | 4 | 50 | 30 | +20 | 40 |
| 3 | Honda Luminozo Sayama | 18 | 11 | 1 | 6 | 41 | 22 | +19 | 34 |
| 4 | Toho Titanium | 18 | 8 | 5 | 5 | 27 | 23 | +4 | 29 |
| 5 | Saitama | 18 | 7 | 3 | 8 | 31 | 35 | −4 | 24 |
| 6 | Nirasaki Astros | 18 | 8 | 0 | 10 | 42 | 47 | −5 | 24 |
| 7 | Aries Tokyo | 18 | 6 | 4 | 8 | 19 | 26 | −7 | 22 |
| 8 | Kuyo | 18 | 4 | 4 | 10 | 24 | 38 | −14 | 16 |
| 9 | Kanagawa Teachers | 18 | 3 | 5 | 10 | 24 | 39 | −15 | 14 |
| 10 | Ibaraki Teachers | 18 | 2 | 5 | 11 | 25 | 61 | −36 | 11 |

Source: RSSSF

=== Hokushin'etsu ===
| Pos | Team | Pld | W | D | L | GF | GA | GD | Pts |
|---|---|---|---|---|---|---|---|---|---|
| 1 | YKK | 8 | 7 | 1 | 0 | 26 | 3 | +23 | 22 |
| 2 | Ueda Gentian | 8 | 6 | 0 | 2 | 19 | 16 | +3 | 18 |
| 3 | Fukui Teachers | 8 | 5 | 0 | 3 | 16 | 12 | +4 | 14 (Note: 1 point deducted?) |
| 4 | Nissei Plastic Industrial | 8 | 4 | 1 | 3 | 17 | 12 | +5 | 13 |
| 5 | Teihens | 8 | 4 | 0 | 4 | 8 | 10 | −2 | 12 |
| 6 | Valiente Toyama | 8 | 4 | 0 | 4 | 14 | 17 | −3 | 12 |
| 7 | Niigatashuyukai | 8 | 3 | 0 | 5 | 12 | 14 | −2 | 9 |
| 8 | Yamaga | 8 | 1 | 0 | 7 | 6 | 18 | −12 | 3 |
| 9 | Renaiss College | 8 | 1 | 0 | 7 | 8 | 24 | −16 | 3 |

Source: RSSSF

=== Tōkai ===
| Pos | Team | Pld | W | D | L | GF | GA | GD | Pts |
|---|---|---|---|---|---|---|---|---|---|
| 1 | Yazaki Valente | 15 | 12 | 0 | 3 | 56 | 23 | +33 | 36 |
| 2 | Hitachi Shimizu | 15 | 8 | 6 | 1 | 37 | 19 | +18 | 30 |
| 3 | Matsushita Electric Iga | 15 | 8 | 5 | 2 | 32 | 23 | +9 | 29 |
| 4 | Nagoya | 15 | 9 | 1 | 5 | 35 | 32 | +3 | 28 |
| 5 | Chuo Bohan | 15 | 7 | 5 | 3 | 25 | 15 | +10 | 26 |
| 6 | Minolta | 15 | 7 | 5 | 3 | 32 | 26 | +6 | 26 |
| 7 | Fujieda City Government | 15 | 8 | 1 | 6 | 35 | 22 | +13 | 25 |
| 8 | Nagoya Bank | 15 | 7 | 2 | 6 | 37 | 42 | −5 | 23 |
| 9 | Toyoda Machine Works | 15 | 6 | 2 | 7 | 17 | 25 | −8 | 20 |
| 10 | Chukyo University | 15 | 4 | 3 | 8 | 19 | 21 | −2 | 15 |
| 11 | Maruyasu | 15 | 4 | 3 | 8 | 19 | 28 | −9 | 15 |
| 12 | Toyota | 15 | 3 | 5 | 7 | 30 | 32 | −2 | 14 |
| 13 | Yamaha Motors | 15 | 4 | 2 | 9 | 19 | 32 | −13 | 14 |
| 14 | Kasugai Club | 15 | 4 | 2 | 9 | 17 | 32 | −15 | 14 |
| 15 | Toyoda Automatic Loom Works | 15 | 3 | 3 | 9 | 21 | 35 | −14 | 12 |
| 16 | Shizuoka Subaru | 15 | 3 | 1 | 11 | 14 | 38 | −24 | 10 |

Source: RSSSF

=== Kansai ===
| Pos | Team | Pld | W | D | L | GF | GA | GD | Pts |
|---|---|---|---|---|---|---|---|---|---|
| 1 | Sagawa Express Osaka | 18 | 14 | 2 | 2 | 58 | 14 | +44 | 44 |
| 2 | Kyoto Shiko Club | 18 | 9 | 5 | 4 | 32 | 21 | +11 | 32 |
| 3 | Osaka Gas | 18 | 9 | 4 | 5 | 34 | 30 | +4 | 31 |
| 4 | Sagawa Printing | 18 | 7 | 5 | 6 | 36 | 34 | +2 | 26 |
| 5 | Takada | 18 | 7 | 5 | 6 | 25 | 25 | 0 | 26 |
| 6 | Hermano Osaka | 18 | 7 | 1 | 10 | 39 | 39 | 0 | 22 |
| 7 | NTT West Japan Kyoto | 18 | 7 | 1 | 10 | 32 | 38 | −6 | 22 |
| 8 | Kobe 1970 | 18 | 5 | 4 | 9 | 32 | 39 | −7 | 19 |
| 9 | Sanyo Electric Sumoto | 18 | 5 | 4 | 9 | 35 | 46 | −11 | 19 |
| 10 | West Osaka | 18 | 3 | 3 | 12 | 24 | 61 | −37 | 12 |

Source: RSSSF

=== Chūgoku ===
| Pos | Team | Pld | W | PKW | PKL | L | GF | GA | GD | Pts |
|---|---|---|---|---|---|---|---|---|---|---|
| 1 | Tottori | 14 | 11 | 0 | 0 | 3 | 40 | 14 | +26 | 33 |
| 2 | Mitsubishi Motors Mizushima | 14 | 8 | 3 | 1 | 2 | 46 | 20 | +26 | 31 |
| 3 | Hiroshima Teachers | 14 | 5 | 2 | 3 | 4 | 37 | 27 | +10 | 22 |
| 4 | Hiroshima Fujita | 14 | 6 | 1 | 2 | 5 | 29 | 31 | −2 | 22 |
| 5 | Yamaguchi Teachers | 14 | 6 | 1 | 0 | 7 | 20 | 34 | −14 | 20 |
| 6 | Nisshin Steel Kure | 14 | 5 | 1 | 1 | 7 | 36 | 40 | −4 | 18 |
| 7 | Mazda | 14 | 4 | 1 | 1 | 8 | 26 | 44 | −18 | 15 |
| 8 | Nippon Mitsubishi Oil | 14 | 1 | 1 | 2 | 10 | 16 | 40 | −24 | 7 |

Source: RSSSF

=== Shikoku ===
| Pos | Team | Pld | W | D | L | GF | GA | GD | Pts |
|---|---|---|---|---|---|---|---|---|---|
| 1 | Ehime | 14 | 11 | 2 | 1 | 53 | 16 | +37 | 35 |
| 2 | Nangoku Kochi | 14 | 11 | 1 | 2 | 47 | 17 | +30 | 34 |
| 3 | Teijin | 14 | 8 | 2 | 4 | 25 | 15 | +10 | 26 |
| 4 | Sunlife | 14 | 8 | 1 | 5 | 35 | 32 | +3 | 25 |
| 5 | Sanyo Electric Tokushima | 14 | 6 | 1 | 7 | 23 | 43 | −20 | 19 |
| 6 | Primaham Saijo | 14 | 3 | 2 | 9 | 25 | 39 | −14 | 11 |
| 7 | Showa Club | 14 | 2 | 1 | 11 | 15 | 41 | −26 | 7 |
| 8 | NTT Shikoku | 14 | 1 | 2 | 11 | 21 | 41 | −20 | 5 |

Source: RSSSF

=== Kyushu ===
| Pos | Team | Pld | W | PKW | PKL | L | GF | GA | GD | Pts |
|---|---|---|---|---|---|---|---|---|---|---|
| 1 | NTT Kumamoto | 18 | 11 | 3 | 0 | 4 | 47 | 18 | +29 | 39 |
| 2 | Honda Lock | 18 | 12 | 0 | 1 | 5 | 54 | 24 | +30 | 37 |
| 3 | Nippon Steel Oita | 18 | 9 | 3 | 1 | 5 | 32 | 24 | +8 | 34 |
| 4 | Volca Kagoshima | 18 | 10 | 0 | 1 | 7 | 44 | 28 | +16 | 31 |
| 5 | Kyocera Sendai | 18 | 8 | 1 | 2 | 7 | 26 | 31 | −5 | 28 |
| 6 | Mitsubishi Chemical Kurosaki | 18 | 6 | 3 | 2 | 7 | 28 | 31 | −3 | 26 |
| 7 | Lanza Kumamoto | 18 | 6 | 1 | 4 | 7 | 19 | 27 | −8 | 24 |
| 8 | Mitsubishi Heavy Industries Nagasaki | 18 | 6 | 2 | 2 | 8 | 24 | 38 | −14 | 24 |
| 9 | Blaze Kumamoto | 18 | 4 | 3 | 1 | 10 | 20 | 34 | −14 | 19 |
| 10 | Okinawa Kaiho Bank | 18 | 2 | 0 | 2 | 14 | 14 | 53 | −39 | 8 |

Source: RSSSF
