= 2008 Japan Football League =

Japan Football League
- Season: 2008
- Dates: 16 March – 30 November
- Champions: Honda FC; 4th JFL title 5th D3 title
- Promoted: Tochigi SC; Kataller Toyama; Fagiano Okayama
- Matches played: 306
- Goals scored: 890 (2.91 per match)
- Top goalscorer: Junya Nitta (25 goals total)
- Highest attendance: 13,821 (Round 34, Tochigi vs. Kariya)
- Lowest attendance: 141 (Round 4, Mizushima vs. Yokogawa)
- Average attendance: 1,573

The 2008 Japan Football League (Japanese: 第10回日本フットボールリーグ, Hepburn: Dai Jikkai Nihon Futtobōru Rīgu) was the tenth season of the Japan Football League, the third tier of the Japanese football league system.

== Overview ==
2008 JFL teams

It was contested by 18 teams. Honda FC won the championship.

ALO's Hokuriku and YKK AP, both based in Toyama merged before the season to become Kataller Toyama.

Fagiano Okayama, New Wave Kitakyushu and MIO Biwako Kusatsu were promoted from Regional leagues by the virtue of their placing in the Regional League promotion series.

New Wave Kitakyushu and Kataller Toyama were approved as J. League associate members at the annual meeting in January. Fagiano Okayama were approved back in 2007 when playing in Regional league. FC Ryukyu's application was declined.

== Table ==
Pos	Team	Pld	W	D	L	GF	GA	GD	Pts	Promotion
1	Honda FC (C)	34	22	8	4	80	33	+47	74	
2	Tochigi SC (Note: Occupied the top place at the end of the first half of the season (17th week) and was automatically qualified for 2008 Emperor's Cup, while each of other JFL clubs had to go through the prefectural qualifier.) (Note: J. League Associate Membership) (P)	34	18	9	7	65	37	+28	63	Promotion to 2009 J. League Division 2 (Note: Must hold J. League Associate Membership, finish no less than in fourth place and pass a final inspection by J. League to be promoted.)
3	Kataller Toyama (P)	34	18	8	8	61	36	+25	62	Promotion to 2009 J. League Division 2
4	Fagiano Okayama (P)	34	17	9	8	63	43	+20	60	Promotion to 2009 J. League Division 2
5	Gainare Tottori	34	17	6	11	57	37	+20	57	
6	Ryutsu Keizai University	34	17	6	11	56	48	+8	57	
7	Yokogawa Musashino	34	15	9	10	43	34	+9	54	
8	FC Kariya	34	13	12	9	47	40	+7	51	
9	Sony Sendai	34	15	4	15	53	42	+11	49	
10	New Wave Kitakyushu	34	13	10	11	49	48	+1	49	
11	SP Kyoto	34	12	13	9	43	42	+1	49	
12	Sagawa Shiga	34	12	11	11	53	47	+6	47	
13	TDK SC	34	10	11	13	48	47	+1	41	
14	MIO Biwako Kusatsu	34	10	8	16	40	62	−22	38	
15	JEF Reserves	34	8	6	20	31	53	−22	30	
16	FC Ryukyu	34	7	6	21	31	58	−27	27	
17	Arte Takasaki	34	5	5	24	40	107	−67	20	
18	Mitsubishi Motors Mizushima	34	3	7	24	30	76	−46	16	

Updated to match(es) played on November 30, 2008. Source: Japan Football League
Rules for classification: 1) points; 2) goal difference; 3) number of goals scored.
(C) Champions; (P) Promoted

== Results ==
Home \ Away	ART	FAG	GAI	HON	JER	KAR	KAT	RKU	MIO	MMM	NWK	PRI	RYU	SSH	SON	TDK	TOC	YMC
Arte Takasaki		1–3	1–1	0–3	2–1	1–2	0–5	1–0	3–1	3–2	1–3	0–5	1–1	1–1	2–6	1–3	2–3	1–7
Fagiano Okayama	5–1		0–1	2–3	3–1	0–0	3–2	2–2	2–0	2–0	4–2	0–0	2–2	0–1	2–2	1–2	0–0	2–0
Gainare Tottori	8–1	2–3		4–1	0–1	1–3	1–2	3–1	2–1	2–1	1–0	1–0	5–1	1–2	0–0	4–0	0–1	1–0
Honda FC	11–1	2–3	5–1		3–1	6–1	2–1	0–0	4–0	1–0	2–2	1–1	1–0	0–0	1–0	4–2	2–1	1–0
JEF Reserves	1–1	1–2	0–1	1–0		0–3	1–2	0–2	0–1	1–1	2–3	1–2	1–0	2–1	1–2	1–1	1–1	1–2
FC Kariya	3–1	2–2	0–1	1–2	1–0		1–2	1–1	0–1	1–0	1–1	2–2	4–1	2–1	0–3	1–1	0–1	1–2
Kataller Toyama	2–1	1–1	1–0	2–2	0–1	0–1		3–2	5–1	3–0	2–2	1–1	1–0	1–1	3–0	3–1	0–0	4–1
Ryutsu Keizai University	3–2	2–1	2–0	0–2	1–0	0–2	1–0		4–3	1–1	2–1	1–2	1–3	3–1	1–3	1–1	2–1	1–2
MIO Biwako Kusatsu	2–2	1–2	0–3	2–4	0–3	0–0	1–2	1–2		2–0	1–0	1–1	1–0	3–3	1–0	1–4	2–2	0–2
Mitsubishi Motors Mizushima	3–1	0–3	0–2	1–2	1–1	3–3	0–4	1–4	3–0		1–2	0–1	1–1	1–3	0–1	0–2	0–3	0–2
New Wave Kitakyushu	1–0	3–1	1–1	2–2	3–2	1–0	2–0	4–2	0–1	2–0		1–1	0–1	1–1	0–3	0–2	2–3	2–1
SP Kyoto	1–0	0–0	3–0	1–6	2–0	1–2	0–1	0–2	1–1	3–3	0–0		2–0	0–1	1–0	1–1	2–2	1–1
FC Ryukyu	1–0	1–2	0–4	0–2	4–0	1–4	2–1	1–4	1–1	4–1	1–1	1–2		0–2	0–2	0–1	0–1	1–2
Sagawa Shiga	7–4	1–2	1–1	1–1	1–2	0–0	2–2	2–3	1–2	1–2	2–0	1–3	3–0		2–1	1–0	3–2	1–1
Sony Sendai	1–2	3–2	1–2	0–2	1–1	0–1	2–0	0–1	1–3	4–3	3–1	5–1	0–1	1–2		3–2	3–2	0–1
TDK SC	3–0	1–2	1–1	1–1	1–2	1–1	1–1	0–1	1–1	5–0	2–3	1–2	1–0	3–2	0–2		0–0	1–3
Tochigi SC	6–1	2–1	1–1	1–0	4–0	1–1	1–2	4–3	4–3	5–0	1–1	4–0	3–1	2–1	1–0	2–1		0–1
Yokogawa Musashino	2–1	1–3	2–1	0–1	1–0	2–2	1–2	0–0	0–1	1–1	1–2	1–0	1–1	0–0	0–0	1–1	1–0	

Updated to match(es) played on November 30, 2008. Source: JFL First Round, JFL Second Round
Legend: Blue = home team win; Yellow = draw; Red = away team win.

== Top scorers ==
Rank	Scorer	Club	Goals
1	(Japan) Junya Nitta	Honda FC	25
2	(Japan) Kodai Suzuki	Honda FC	20
3	(Japan) Yasutaka Kobayashi	Fagiano Okayama	19
4	(Japan) Kohei Kiyama	Fagiano Okayama	18
5	(Japan) Yusuke Sato	Tochigi SC	16
6	(Japan) Mitsuru Hasegawa	Kataller Toyama	15
6	(Japan) Gen Nakamura	Sagawa Shiga	15
8	(Japan) Goshi Okubo	Sony Sendai	14
8	(Japan) Go Togashi	TDK SC	14
10	(Japan) Kiyohiro Hirabayashi	FC Kariya	12
10	(Japan) Hideyuki Ishida	Kataller Toyama	12

== Attendance ==
Pos	Team	Total	High	Low	Average	Change
1	Tochigi SC	85,816	13,821	2,704	5,048	+13.3%
2	Kataller Toyama	73,205	10,704	2,008	4,306	+208.9%^{†}
3	Fagiano Okayama	62,297	11,053	1,457	3,665	+15.8%^{‡}
4	Gainare Tottori	54,652	7,117	1,363	3,215	+83.2%
5	FC Ryukyu	48,997	6,247	1,708	2,882	+18.0%
6	New Wave Kitakyushu	19,539	1,752	725	1,149	−5.0%^{‡}
7	Yokogawa Musashino	17,087	4,101	384	1,005	+49.3%
8	TDK SC	16,170	3,261	564	951	−3.3%
9	Sony Sendai	14,788	2,379	325	870	+50.3%
10	Honda FC	14,512	3,042	529	854	+33.2%
11	MIO Biwako Kusatsu	14,511	2,102	307	854	+243.0%^{‡}
12	Sagawa Shiga	14,469	3,623	259	851	−7.9%
13	FC Kariya	10,261	1,777	227	604	+17.3%
14	Ryutsu Keizai University	9,246	1,284	183	544	−3.0%
15	JEF Reserves	8,243	1,467	204	485	+17.1%
16	SP Kyoto	6,262	636	165	368	−7.3%
17	Mitsubishi Motors Mizushima	6,038	1,115	141	355	−4.1%
18	Arte Takasaki	5,104	854	144	300	−26.8%
	League total	481,197	13,821	141	1,573	+19.9%

Source: JFL First Round, JFL Second Round
Notes:
^{†} Kataller Toyama attendance is compared to the combined figure of its predecessors, ALO's Hokuriku and YKK AP
^{‡} Team played previous season in Regional Leagues.

== Promotion and relegation ==
No relegation has occurred. Machida Zelvia, V-Varen Nagasaki and Honda Lock were promoted to JFL from Regional leagues at the end of the season.
