= Sony Sendai FC =

Japanese football club

Sony Sendai FC ソニー仙台FC
- Full name: Sony Sendai Football Club
- Founded: 1968; 58 years ago
- Dissolved: 31 December 2024; 13 months ago
- Stadium: Yurtec Stadium Sendai; Sendai, Miyagi Prefecture
- Capacity: 19,694
- Owner: Sony
- Manager: Jun Suzuki
- League: Disbanded
- 2024: JFL, 12th of 16
- Website: www.sonysendaifc.jp
Home colours	Away colours

Sony Sendai Football Club (ソニー仙台FC, Sonī Sendai Efu Shī) was a former Japanese football club based in Sendai, Miyagi Prefecture, Japan. They last played in the Japan Football League, Japanese fourth tier of football league until 2024. They were withdrawn by their company.

== History ==
The club was founded by the workers of Sony's Sendai factory in 1968. They kept a low profile playing mainly in the Miyagi Prefecture League for a long time. However, it changed suddenly in 1993 when they embarked on a challenging task to reach the former Japan Football League within 5 years. They became league champions for 4 consecutive seasons starting from 1994, first in the Prefecture League and the others in the Tōhoku Regional League. They achieved their goal and were promoted to the JFL by winning the 1997 Regional League play-off.

When the J. League Division 2 was formed in 1999, the club decided not to turn professional. They joined the newly organised Japan Football League instead and have been an established JFL side since then.

As a result of the 2011 Tōhoku earthquake and tsunami, Sony Sendai, with permission from the JFL, did not contest the first half of the 2011 season. They expectedly earned last place on points, but due to Machida Zelvia and Matsumoto Yamaga being promoted to Division 2 and JEF Reserves withdrawing from the competition, they were spared relegation.

In 2015, Sony Sendai won the second stage and earned its first JFL title by defeating first stage champions Vanraure Hachinohe on penalties after a tied two-leg final on aggregate.

On 27 September 2024, Sony announced the dissolution of the team, effective at the end of the 2024 JFL season, after fifty-six years of existence.

The Sony Group cited restructuring (downsizing) of its recording media business, which was based at the Tagajyo site of Sony Storage Media Manufacturing, its direct operating entity, as the reason for the cease of operations.

On 3 October 2024, the JFL Board of Directors unanimously approved Sony Sendai's withdrawal from the JFL, officially deciding that the club will leave the JFL at the end of this year.

== League and cup record ==
Champions	Runners-up	Third place	Promoted	Relegated

League													Emperor's Cup	Shakaijin Cup
Season	Division	Tier	Teams	Pos.	P	W (OTW)	D	L	F	A	GD	Pts	Emperor's Cup	Shakaijin Cup
1998	Former JFL	2	16	13th	30	7 (1)	1	22	42	71	-29	23	2nd round	-
1999	JFL	3	9	5th	24	7 (2)	1	14	29	42	-13	26	3rd round	Runner-up
2000	JFL	3	12	5th	22	11 (2)	0	9	51	37	14	37	1st round	Not eligible
2001	JFL	3	16	14th	30	9	5	16	28	46	-18	32	1st round	Not eligible
2002	JFL	3	18	4th	17	8	6	3	25	16	9	30	1st round	Not eligible
2003	JFL	3	16	9th	30	13	6	11	46	44	2	45	1st round	Not eligible
2004	JFL	3	16	6th	30	13	8	9	50	42	8	47	3rd round	Not eligible
2005	JFL	3	16	7th	30	15	5	10	48	37	11	50	-	Not eligible
2006	JFL	3	18	9th	34	10	7	17	48	65	-17	37	1st round	Not eligible
2007	JFL	3	18	11th	34	13	5	16	46	59	-13	44	2nd round	Not eligible
2008	JFL	3	18	9th	34	15	4	15	53	42	11	49	3rd round	Not eligible
2009	JFL	3	18	3rd	34	17	8	9	49	30	19	59	2nd round	Not eligible
2010	JFL	3	18	14th	34	11	9	14	34	42	-8	42	3rd round	Not eligible
2011	JFL	3	18	18th	17	3	7	7	14	24	-10	16	2nd round	Not eligible
2012	JFL	3	17	12th	32	9	12	11	27	29	-2	39	2nd round	Not eligible
2013	JFL	3	18	9th	34	12	14	8	33	34	-1	50	2nd round	Not eligible
2014	JFL	4	14	5th	26	13	7	6	45	29	16	46	3rd round	Not eligible
2015	JFL	4	16	1st	30	21	8	1	48	21	27	71	-	Not eligible
2016	JFL	4	16	6th	30	17	6	7	56	27	29	57	1st round	Not eligible
2017	JFL	4	16	3rd	30	18	5	7	64	36	28	59	1st round	Not eligible
2018	JFL	4	16	4th	30	16	4	10	67	43	24	52	2nd round	Not eligible
2019	JFL	4	16	2nd	30	16	7	7	60	34	26	55	-	Not eligible
2020	JFL	4	16	3rd	15	8	2	5	25	22	3	26	2nd round	Not eligible
2021	JFL	4	16	6th	32	14	6	12	52	39	13	48	2nd round	Not eligible
2022	JFL	4	16	14th	30	5	13	12	23	39	-16	28	-	Not eligible
2023	JFL	4	15	4th	28	11	10	7	46	40	4	43	2nd round	Not eligible
2024	JFL	4	16	12th	30	10	7	13	34	40	-6	37	2nd round	Not eligible

Key

- P = Games played; W = Games won; D = Games drawn; L = Games lost; F = Goals scored; A = Goals conceded; GD = Goals difference; Pts = Points gained

== Honours ==
Sony Sendai FC
Honour	No.	Years
National Regional League Finals	1	1997
Japan Football League	1	2015
Tohoku Adult Soccer League	3	1995, 1996, 1997

== Current squad ==
As of 1 April 2024. Note: Flags indicate national team as defined under FIFA eligibility rules; some limited exceptions apply. Players may hold more than one non-FIFA nationality.

No.	Pos.	Nation	Player
1	GK	JPN	Masahiro Sagawa
2	DF	JPN	Yuji Goto
3	DF	JPN	Yuji Shiozaki
4	DF	JPN	Kosuke Nagae
5	MF	JPN	Kento Hirata
6	DF	JPN	Masato Nakayama
7	MF	JPN	Kyohei Yoshimori
8	MF	JPN	Ryota Ito
9	FW	JPN	Taro Katsuura
10	MF	JPN	Motoki Fujiwara
11	MF	JPN	Eishun Shida
13	FW	JPN	Shimpei Yamada
14	MF	JPN	Ren Yoshino (captain)

No.	Pos.	Nation	Player
15	FW	JPN	Tom Nunokata
16	DF	JPN	Ryodai Tsuji
17	FW	JPN	Yuya Kato
18	MF	JPN	Yuta Akimoto
19	FW	JPN	Taisei Komoto
20	MF	JPN	Rikuto Koike
21	GK	JPN	Shun Yaida
22	DF	JPN	Yuya Hirayama
23	DF	JPN	Yusei Kanda
25	DF	JPN	Tasuku Yamashita
26	GK	JPN	Ryo Matsuda
30	DF	JPN	Goshi Otomo

== Coaching staff ==
Position	Name
Head coach	(Japan) Jun Suzuki
Assistant head coach	(Japan) Shinji Honda (Japan) Kenta Ogihara
Goalkeeper coach	(Japan) Susumu Kaneko
Trainer	(Japan) Taku Shikama (Japan) Naoya Hiraizumi

== Managerial history ==
Manager	Nationality	Tenure	
Manager	Nationality	Start	Finish
Kazuaki Nagasawa	Japan	1 February 1999	31 January 2001
Noboru Yoshida	Japan	1 February 2001	31 January 2004
Eiji Satō	Japan	1 February 2004	31 January 2008
Hidenori Tabata	Japan	1 February 2008	31 January 2012
Masato Ishikawa	Japan	1 February 2012	31 January 2018
Shinji Honda	Japan	1 February 2018	31 July 2019
Gen Nakamura	Japan	1 August 2019	31 January 2022
Jun Suzuki	Japan	1 February 2022	31 December 2024

== Kit evolution ==
FP 1st
2002 - 2007	2008 - 2016	2013 - 2016	2017 - 2020	2021 - 2023
2024

FP 2nd
2002 - 2007	2008 - 2016	2013 - 2016	2017 - 2020	2021 - 2023
2024
