= Kaito Omomo =

Japanese footballer

Personal information
- Date of birth: 28 October 1997 (age 29)
- Place of birth: Sanjō, Niigata, Japan
- Height: 1.81 m (5 ft 11 in)
- Position: Defender

Team information
- Current team: Tokyo Musashino United FC
- Number: 26

Youth career
- J Dream Sanjō
- Nagaoka JYFC
- –2015: Teikyo Nagaoka HS
- 2016–2019: Waseda University

Senior career*
Years	Team	Apps	(Gls)
2020–2022	Nagano Parceiro	6	(0)
2022-2023	FC Osaka	4	(0)
2024-	Tokyo Musashino United FC	15	(0)
- * Club domestic league appearances and goals as of 28 August 2024 @ 14:24(AEST)

Kaito Omomo (大桃 海斗, Omomo Kaito; born 28 October 1997) is a Japanese footballer currently playing as a defender for Nagano Parceiro.

== Career statistics ==
=== Club ===
As of 27 March 2021.

Club	Season	League			National Cup		League Cup		Other		Total	
Club	Season	Division	Apps	Goals	Apps	Goals	Apps	Goals	Apps	Goals	Apps	Goals
Nagano Parceiro	2020	J3 League	4	0	0	0	–		0	0	4	0
Nagano Parceiro	2021	J3 League	0	0	0	0	–		0	0	0	0
Career total			4	0	0	0	0	0	0	0	4	0
