= Yokogawa Musashino FC =

Japanese football club

Yokogawa Musashino FC 横河武蔵野FC
- Full name: Yokogawa Musashino Football Club
- Founded: 1939; 87 years ago as Yokogawa Electric Corporation
- Ground: Musashino Municipal Athletic Stadium; Musashino City, Tokyo
- Capacity: 5,000
- Chairman: Hikaru Yoshikawa
- Manager: Hisayuki Ikegami
- League: Japan Football League
- 2025: 14th of 16
- Website: fc.yokogawa-musashino.jp
Home colours	Away colours

Yokogawa Musashino FC (横河武蔵野FC, Yokogawa Musashino Efu Shī), formerly Tokyo Musashino United FC (東京武蔵野ユナイテッドFC, Tōkyō Musashino Yunaiteddo Efu Shī) is a football club based in Musashino, Tokyo, Japan. They currently play in the Japan Football League, Japan's fourth tier of league football. The team colours are blue and yellow.

== History ==
The club was founded as a football club of Yokogawa Electric Corporation in 1939. In 1978, the club achieved their first promotion to the Kanto Regional League. Despite experiencing the relegation to the Tokyo Prefecture League twice, they were determined to bounce back and gained the promotion to the Japan Football League in 1999. Although the club still have strong association with Yokogawa Electric, they left the nest in 2003 and started the new life as a non-corporation club under the name Yokogawa Musashino until 2015. The club was renamed Tokyo Musashino City in January 2016.

In February 2021, the club renamed its official name to Tokyo Musashino United Football Club.

On 4 December 2023, Tokyo Musashino United announced that they would be renaming its official name back to Yokogawa Musashino Football Club. The club's former crest (when playing as Yokogawa Musashino FC) was restored, as well, starting from the 2024 season. Yokogawa Musashino are one of the two teams have competed in Japan Football League every year since its inception in 1999, the other being Honda FC.

== Stadiums ==
Their home ground is Musashino Municipal Athletic Stadium, but they also play some of their home games at Ajinomoto Stadium, Ajinomoto Stadium sub ground, Edogawa Stadium, and Nishigaoka Soccer Stadium.

== League & cup record ==
Champions	Runners-up	Third place	Promoted	Relegated

League														Emperor's Cup
Season	Division	Tier	Teams	Pos.	P	W (OTW)	D	L	F	A	GD	Pts	Attendance/G	Emperor's Cup
Yokogawa Electric
1999	JFL	3	9	8th	24	6 (1)	-	17	26	42	-16	20		
2000	JFL	3	12	12th	22	2	3	17	21	41	-20	9		1st round
2001	JFL	3	16	7th	30	12	5	13	37	54	-17	41		Did not qualify
2002	JFL	3	18	7th	17	8	4	5	21	26	-5	28	530	Did not qualify
Yokogawa Musashino
2003	JFL	3	16	13th	30	9	2	19	32	65	-33	29		Did not qualify
2004	JFL	3	16	13th	30	8	8	14	41	51	-10	32		Did not qualify
2005	JFL	3	16	9th	30	14	6	10	37	29	8	48		Did not qualify
2006	JFL	3	18	6th	34	17	9	8	58	38	20	60		Did not qualify
2007	JFL	3	18	7th	34	16	6	12	50	44	6	54		Did not qualify
2008	JFL	3	18	7th	34	15	9	10	43	34	9	54		Did not qualify
2009	JFL	3	18	2nd	34	17	9	8	48	34	14	60		2nd round
2010	JFL	3	18	12th	34	12	8	14	34	38	-4	44		Did not qualify
2011	JFL	3	18	15th	33	9	9	15	33	37	-4	36		Did not qualify
2012	JFL	3	17	10th	32	11	8	13	35	50	-15	41		4th round
2013	JFL	3	18	10th	34	13	10	11	36	36	0	49		2nd round
2014	JFL	4	14	6th	26	9	8	9	31	31	0	35		Did not qualify
2015	JFL	4	16	12th	30	8	6	16	31	40	-9	30		Did not qualify
Tokyo Musashino City
2016	JFL	4	16	12th	30	9	8	13	29	38	-9	35		Did not qualify
2017	JFL	4	16	11th	30	8	9	13	44	47	-3	33		Did not qualify
2018	JFL	4	16	6th	30	14	7	9	49	36	13	49		Did not qualify
2019	JFL	4	16	4th	30	13	9	8	44	39	5	48		Did not qualify
2020	JFL	4	16	11th	15	5	4	6	15	17	-2	19		3rd round
Tokyo Musashino United
2021	JFL	4	17	15th	32	9	5	18	38	53	-15	32		Did not qualify
2022	JFL	4	16	6th	30	14	6	10	49	33	16	48		Did not qualify
2023	JFL	4	15	13th	28	9	5	14	30	36	-6	32		Did not qualify
Yokogawa Musashino
2024	JFL	4	16	15th	30	5	8	18	25	48	-23	23		1st round
2025	JFL	4	16	14th	30	7	8	15	17	37	-20	29		Did not qualify
2026-27	JFL	4	16	TBD	30									TBD

Key

- Pos. = Position in league; P = Games played; W = Games won; D = Games drawn; L = Games lost; F = Goals scored; A = Goals conceded; GD = Goals difference; Pts = Points gained
- Attendance/G = Average league home attendance

== Honours ==
Yokogawa Musashino FC Honours
Honour	No.	Years
Shakaijin Cup	1	1993, 1997
Kanto Soccer League	3	1994, 1997, 1998
Japanese Regional Promotion Series	1	1998
Tokyo Metropolitan Soccer Tournament Emperor's Cup Tokyo Qualifiers	5	2000, 2012, 2013, 2020, 2024

== Current squad ==
As of 16 August 2024. Note: Flags indicate national team as defined under FIFA eligibility rules; some limited exceptions apply. Players may hold more than one non-FIFA nationality.

No.	Pos.	Nation	Player
1	GK	JPN	Shunya Nitta
2	MF	JPN	Riku Yamada
3	DF	JPN	Kenta Ichimiya
4	DF	JPN	Ryoma Nakagawa
5	MF	JPN	Yuya Suzuki
6	DF	JPN	Shun Torii
7	MF	JPN	Takumi Kaneda
8	DF	JPN	Daichi Kobayashi (captain)
9	FW	JPN	Taiki Yukutake
10	MF	JPN	Kyosuke Goto
11	FW	JPN	Koki Taguchi
13	DF	JPN	Rei Morita
14	FW	JPN	Kosuke Sawano
15	FW	JPN	Ryoichi Imamura
16	DF	JPN	Ryuichi Tanimoto
17	MF	JPN	Yuki Onodera
18	MF	JPN	Koji Ishihara
20	MF	JPN	Ukyo Hirano
21	GK	JPN	Atsuki Suetsugu

No.	Pos.	Nation	Player
22	MF	JPN	Goru Teramoto
23	FW	JPN	Daiji Oguchi
24	FW	JPN	Ryosuke Yamazaki
25	DF	JPN	Haruki Nishimi
26	MF	JPN	Daiki Kawato
27	MF	JPN	Motoki Tokisato
28	DF	JPN	Shunsuke Yamazaki
29	MF	JPN	Naoya Yoshida
30	MF	JPN	Ryunosuke Suzuki
31	GK	JPN	Takuya Atsumi
32	DF	JPN	Kaito Omomo
33	DF	JPN	Motoya Toyoshima
34	FW	JPN	Takuma Abe
35	MF	JPN	Kazuki Takahashi
36	MF	JPN	Seiya Niizeki
37	DF	JPN	Danto Sugiyama
41	GK	JPN	Taku Kamikawa
50	GK	JPN	Ryusei Ito

== Coaching staff ==
Position	Staff
Manager	(Japan) Hisayuki Ikegami
Assistant manager	(Japan) Takanori Kanamori
First-team coach	(Japan) Masahiro Tomaru (Japan) Yoshisato Uchino (Japan) Masaaki Yabe
Goalkeeper coach	(Japan) Takuya Suzuki (Japan) Keita Yasumoto
Analyst	(Japan) Kentaro Nagai
Athletic trainer	(Japan) Kenji Kano (Japan) Takehiro Ishii

== Managerial history ==
Manager	Nationality	Tenure	
Manager	Nationality	Start	Finish
Hideki Maeda	Japan	1 February 1998	31 January 2000
Hiroki Yoda	Japan	1 February 2007	31 January 2013
Yasuhiro Yoshida	Japan	1 February 2013	31 January 2018
Hisayuki Ikegami	Japan	1 February 2018	31 January 2022
Hiroki Yoda	Japan	1 February 2022	31 January 2023
Toshihiro Ishimura	Japan	1 February 2023	12 September 2024
Hisayuki Ikegami	Japan	12 September 2024	present
