= Japan Football League =

- Founded: 1999; 27 years ago
- Country: Japan
- Confederation: AFC
- Number of clubs: 16
- Level on pyramid: 4
- Promotion to: J2 League (1999–2013); J3 League (2014–present)
- Relegation to: Japanese Regional Leagues
- Domestic cup: Emperor's Cup
- Current champions: Honda FC (11th title) (2025)
- Most championships: Honda FC (11 titles)
- Website: www.jfl.or.jp
- Current: 2026–27 Japan Football League

The Japan Football League (Japanese: 日本フットボールリーグ, Hepburn: Nihon Futtobōru Rīgu), also known as simply the JFL, is the 4th tier of the Japanese association football league system, positioned beneath the three divisions of the J.League. The league features fully professional teams that hold J.League associate membership among its ranks.

== Relationship and position of J. League and Japan Football League (JFL) ==
According to the official document published in December 2013 when the J3 League was established, the J3 League was the 3rd level of the J.League. The J.League and non-J.League amateur leagues have different hierarchical structures, and the J3 League was ranked on the same level as the JFL. In addition, the JFL itself has the same recognition in the material showing the league composition on the official website. Therefore, the JFL is treated as equal to J3 in theory, but in practice it is considered equivalent to a 4th division.

== History ==
The Japan Football League started from the 1999 season when the second division of J.League (J2) was also born. Until then, J.League consisted of only one division and the former JFL was the second highest division. Out of 16 teams who played the last season of the former JFL, 9 decided and were accepted to play in J2 and the other 7 teams as well as Yokogawa Electric, the winners of the Regional League Promotion Series, formed the new Japan Football League. These 8 teams together with Yokohama FC that was allowed to participate as a special case after the merger of Yokohama Flügels and Yokohama Marinos competed in the inaugural 1999 season.

The 9 teams that competed in the first season were as follows: Denso SC, Honda Motors, Jatco SC, Kokushikan University F.C., Mito HollyHock, Otsuka Pharmaceuticals, Sony Sendai, Yokohama FC and Yokogawa Electric.

In the second season the number of clubs was increased from 9 to 12, reaching 16 in 2001. In 2002 it was briefly 18 clubs before going back to 16 the next season and settling for good at 18 in 2006. For the 2012 season it had 17 clubs due to the late withdrawal of Arte Takasaki.

The league suffered another contraction after 2013 season, as 10 of its 18 teams joined the newly created J3 League. It also moved a tier down the pyramid, making it fourth-tier league since 2014.

Six former JFL clubs have competed in the top flight: Yokohama FC (2007, 2020, 2021, 2023 & 2025), Otsuka Pharmaceuticals (2014 & 2021 as Tokushima Vortis), Matsumoto Yamaga (2015 & 2019), V-Varen Nagasaki (2018 & 2026–27), Machida Zelvia (since 2024), and Fagiano Okayama (since 2025). Mito HollyHock will be the next to do so (in 2026–27).

When the J.League decided in 2023 on a transition to an autumn–spring season from 2026, starting in August and finishing in May of the following year, the JFL announced in 2024 its approval of adopting the same season as the J.League's, making the 2025 season the last to be within a calendar year.

== Overview ==
JFL clubs may be affiliated to companies, or be entirely autonomous clubs or reserve teams of these. Until 2010, university clubs (which as a rule do not play in the Japanese football league system) were recommended by the Japan University Football Association and played off against bottom JFL teams for entrance. B-teams are allowed to participate but only A-squads of truly autonomous clubs are eligible for J.League associate membership, and with it, promotion to the J.League.

=== Promotion from JFL ===
A club that satisfied the following criteria was promoted to J.League Div. 2 (for the 2012 and 2013 seasons):

- Had J.League associate membership
- Finished the season in the top two in JFL
  - If only the champion had been an associate member, it was automatically promoted.
  - If both the champion and runner-up had been associate members, the champion is automatically promoted and the runner-up plays a promotion/relegation series against the second-to-last club in the J2.
  - If only the runner-up had been an associate member, it plays the promotion/relegation series against the last club in the J2.
- Passed the final inspection by the J.League Committee.

With the establishment of the J3 League in the 2014 season, the top 2 requirements are no longer necessary should a team that is approved by J.League Committee and is a J.League associate member. However, they start in the J3 instead. The JFL is the highest tier of amateur level football in Japan again, but they still serve the purpose of helping potential J.League clubs to participate in the J3.

At a J.League board meeting in August 2021, 60 clubs, of which 20 are J3, were targeted for the entire league, and a possibility that J3 would have exceeded 20 clubs by the 2023 season was brought up. Mitsuru Murai, the J.League chairman, revealed that he was discussing how to adjust to 20 clubs. At this time, he was asked, "If there is a possibility of the [J3] league having 21 teams, is it okay to understand that there are teams that will fall from J3 to JFL?" While under consideration, he admitted that the J3 and JFL were considering the introduction of relegation to the latter league as early as after the 2022 season. Later in November, Murai announced that promotion from and relegation to the JFL had been planned for the end of 2023.

In early January 2023, the J.League introduced the J3–JFL promotion/relegation playoffs, enabling the possibility for teams to be relegated from the J3. The system of promotion and relegation between the J3 and the JFL can be determined by the eligibility (promotion to J3 requires a J.League license) of the JFL's champions and runners-up for the season.

- If only the JFL champions hold a license, they replace automatically the J3's 20th-placed team.
- If only the JFL runners-up hold a license, there are promotion/relegation playoffs with the J3's 20th-placed team.
- If both the JFL champions and runners-up hold a license, there is automatic exchange between the JFL champions and the J3's 20th-placed team, and the runners-up compete in two-legged playoffs with the J3's 19th-placed team.
- If both the JFL champions and runners-up do not hold a license, no exchange takes place; the teams placed third and below in the league standings, even if one of them holds a J3 license, are not entitled to promotion and the playoffs.

=== Relegation from JFL ===
The team at the bottom of the league faces a direct relegation, exchanging its place with Japanese Regional Football Champions League winner, with the team ranked 15th playing the relegation/promotion play-off against the team finishing second in that competition. The number of teams relegated varies depending on the outcome of the play-off or the number of teams withdrawn from the JFL. This use until 2025 season.

From 2026–27 onwards, the two bottom teams are directly relegation without playoffs due to abolish promotion relegation play-off JFL/Regional Leagues.

=== Emperor's Cup eligibility ===
Until 2008, only the club at the top of the standings at half-season (17 matches completed) was qualified for the Emperor's Cup, entering it at the third round along with the clubs in J2, but the allotment was widened to the top three clubs in 2010 due to the expansion of J2. Every other club must qualify through a qualifying cup in their own prefecture and then must enter at the first round. In 2015, only the winner of the apertura (first half) qualified.

=== JFL XI ===
In 1999 (Bangabandhu Cup) and from 2014 to 2019, a JFL XI team played off-season matches against guest teams. The 2016 season also featured an JFL East vs JFL West all-star encounter.

=== JFL Cup ===
In the spring of 2026, as a result of Japan's transition to a European calendar, a special JFL Cup will take place as a transition season to the 2026–27 season. That season's clubs, including newly relegated Azul Claro Numazu and promoted J-Lease FC and Vonds Ichihara will compete.

== 2026–27 season ==
=== Competition format ===
The league follows a one-stage double round-robin, wherein the team finishing at the top of the table following the season is declared the champion. From 2014 to 2018 it used the Apertura and Clausura system, with two winners of each stage contesting the championship in the playoff. From 2019 it used the single table with double round-robin system to 30 matches.

=== Participating clubs ===
Locations of the 2026–27 Japan Football League teams

Kansai Region Japan Football League Teams
Tokyo City Area Japan Football League Teams

Club name	First season in JFL	Seasons in JFL	Home town(s)	Current spell in JFL	Last title	Qualifiable base for J.League
**Azul Claro Numazu**	2014	3	Numazu, Shizuoka	2026–	–	Yes
Briobecca Urayasu Ichikawa	2016	5	Urayasu, Chiba	2023–	–	No
**Criacao Shinjuku**	2022	4	Shinjuku, Tokyo	2022–	–	Yes
Honda FC	1999	27	Hamamatsu, Shizuoka	1999–	2025	No
**Iwate Grulla Morioka**	2025	1	Morioka, Iwate	2025–	–	Yes
J-Lease FC	2026	0	Ōita, Ōita	2026–	–	No
Maruyasu Okazaki	2014	12	Okazaki, Aichi	2014–	–	No
Minebea Mitsumi	2005	19	Miyazaki, Miyazaki	2009–	–	No
Okinawa SV	2023	3	Uruma, Okinawa	2023–	–	No
**ReinMeer Aomori**	2016	10	Aomori, Aomori	2016–	–	Yes
Tiamo Hirakata	2021	5	Hirakata, Osaka	2021–	–	No
**Veertien Mie**	2017	9	Kuwana, Mie	2017–	–	Yes
**Verspah Oita**	2012	14	Beppu, Ōita	2012–	2020	Yes
Vonds Ichihara	2026	0	Ichihara, Chiba	2026–	–	No
Yokogawa Musashino	1999	27	Musashino, Tokyo	1999–	–	No
YSCC Yokohama	2012	3	Yokohama, Kanagawa	2025–	–	No

- Pink background denotes clubs that were most recently promoted from Japanese Regional Leagues through the regional league promotion tournament.
- Gray background indicates the club most recently relegated from J3
- "Qualifiable base for J.League" indicates the club holds a J3 League license. Clubs who actually hold the license are denoted in **bold.**
- Formerly, clubs who wished to join the J.League had to also acquire a 100 Year Plan status membership. The J.League decided that since 2023, it would not be necessary for a club to hold this status in order to enable their promotion.

=== Stadiums (2026–27) ===
Primary venues used in the JFL:

Azul Claro Numazu	Briobecca Urayasu Ichikawa	Criacao Shinjuku	Honda FC
Ashitaka Park Stadium	Kashiwanoha Stadium	Ajinomoto Field Nishigaoka	Honda Miyakoda Soccer Stadium
Capacity: **10,000**	Capacity: **20,000**	Capacity: **7,258**	Capacity: **2,500**
Iwate Grulla Morioka	J-Lease FC	Maruyasu Okazaki	Minebea Mitsumi
Iwagin Stadium	Oita Athletic Stadium	Maruyasu Okazaki Ryuhoku Stadium	Nobeoka Nishishina Athletic Stadium
Capacity: **9,892**	Capacity: **15,943**	Capacity: **5,000**	Capacity: **15,000**
Okinawa SV	ReinMeer Aomori	Tiamo Hirakata	Veertien Mie
Tapic Kenso Hiyagon Stadium	Kakuhiro Group Athletic Stadium	Hirakata City Athletics Stadium	Asahi Gas Energy Toin Stadium
Capacity: **12,270**	Capacity: **2,500**	Capacity: **12,500**	Capacity: **5,104**
Verspah Oita	Vonds Ichihara	Yokogawa Musashino	YSCC Yokohama
Oita Sports Park	ZA Oripri Stadium	Musashino Municipal Athletic Stadium	Mitsuzawa Stadium
Capacity: **2,040**	Capacity: **14,051**	Capacity: **5,192**	Capacity: **15,454**

=== Former clubs ===
Club name	First season in JFL	Seasons in JFL	Hometown(s)	Last spell in JFL	Last JFL title	Current league
ALO's Hokuriku	2000	8	Toyama, Toyama	2000–2007	–	Defunct, merged into Kataller Toyama
Arte Takasaki	2004	8	Takasaki, Gunma	2004–2011	–	Defunct
Asuka FC	2025	1	Kashihara, Nara	2025	—	Kansai League Div. 1
Atletico Suzuka	2019	6	Suzuka, Mie	2019–2025	—	Tokai League Div. 1
Blaublitz Akita	2007	7	All cities/towns in Akita	2007–2013	–	J2
Cobaltore Onagawa	2018	1	Onagawa, Miyagi	2018	–	Tohoku League D1
Ehime FC	2001	5	All cities/towns in Ehime	2001–2005	2005	J3
Fagiano Okayama	2008	1	All cities/towns in Okayama	2008	–	J1
Fagiano Okayama Next	2014	3	Okayama, Okayama	2014–2016	–	Defunct
Fujieda MYFC	2012	2	Fujieda, Shizuoka	2012–2013	–	J2
Fukushima United	2013	1	Fukushima, Fukushima	2013	–	J3
Gainare Tottori	2001	10	All cities/towns in Tottori	2001–2010	2010	J3
FC Gifu	2007	1	All cities/towns in Gifu	2007	–	J3
FC Imabari	2017	3	Imabari, Ehime	2017–2019	–	J2
Iwaki FC	2020	2	Iwaki, Fukushima	2020–2021	2021	J2
Jatco SC	1999	5	Numazu, Shizuoka	1999–2003	–	Defunct
JEF Reserves	2006	6	Ichihara, Chiba	2006–2011	–	Defunct
Kagoshima United	2014	2	Kagoshima, Kagoshima	2014–2015	–	J3
Kagura Shimane	2019	4	Matsue, Shimane	2019–2022	–	Defunct
Kamatamare Sanuki	2011	3	All cities/towns in Kagawa	2011–2013	–	J3
FC Kariya	1999	11	Kariya, Aichi	2021	–	Tōkai League D1
Kataller Toyama	2008	1	All cities/towns in Toyama	2008	–	J2
Kochi United	2020	4	Kochi, Kochi	2020–2024	–	J3
Kokushikan University	1999	6	Machida, Tokyo	1999–2003	–	Kantō University League
Kyoto BAMB 1993	2000	4	Kyoto, Kyoto	2000–2004	–	Kansai League D1
Machida Zelvia	2009	4	Machida, Tokyo	2013	–	J1
Mito HollyHock	1999	1	Mito, Ibaraki	1999	–	J1
Mitsubishi Motors Mizushima	2005	5	Kurashiki, Okayama	2005–2009	–	Chugoku League
Nara Club	2014	9	All cities/towns in Nara	2014–2022	2022	J3
New Wave Kitakyushu	2008	2	Kitakyushu, Fukuoka	2008–2009	–	J3
FC Osaka	2014	9	Higashiōsaka, Osaka	2014–2022	–	J3
Otsuka Pharmaceuticals	1999	6	All cities/towns in Tokushima	1999–2004	2004	J2
Nagano Parceiro	2011	3	Nagano, Nagano	2011–2013	2013	J3
Profesor Miyazaki	2002	1	All cities/towns in Miyazaki	2002	–	Defunct
Reilac Shiga	2008	17	Hikone, Shiga	2008–2025	–	J3
Renofa Yamaguchi	2014	1	Yamaguchi, Yamaguchi	2014	–	J3
Rosso Kumamoto	2001	4	Kumamoto, Kumamoto	2006–2007	–	J3
FC Ryukyu	2006	8	All cities/towns in Okinawa	2006–2013	–	J3
Ryutsu Keizai University	2005	6	Ryugasaki, Ibaraki	2005–2010	–	Ibaraki Prefectural League
Ryutsu Keizai Dragons Ryugasaki	2015	5	Ryugasaki, Ibaraki	2015-2019	–	Kantō League D1
SC Sagamihara	2013	1	Sagamihara, Kanagawa	2013	–	J3
Sagawa Express Osaka	2002	5	Higashisumiyoshi-ku, Osaka	2002–2006	–	Defunct, merged into Sagawa Shiga
Sagawa Express Tokyo	2001	6	Kōtō, Tokyo	2001–2006	–	Defunct, merged into Sagawa Shiga
Sagawa Shiga	2007	6	Moriyama, Shiga	2007–2012	2011	Defunct
Shizuoka Sangyo University	2000	3	Iwata, Shizuoka	2000–2002	–	Tōkai University League
Sony Sendai FC	1999	26	Sendai, Miyagi	1999–2024	2015	Defunct
SP Kyoto FC	2003	13	Uji, Kyoto	2003–2015	–	Defunct
Tegevajaro Miyazaki	2018	3	Miyazaki, Miyazaki	2018–2020	–	J2
Thespa Kusatsu	2004	1	All cities/towns in Gunma	2004	–	J3
Tochigi City FC	2010	8	Tochigi	2024	2024	J2
Tochigi SC	2000	9	Utsunomiya, Tochigi	2000–2008	–	J3
V-Varen Nagasaki	2009	4	All cities/towns in Nagasaki	2009–2012	2012	J1
Vanraure Hachinohe	2014	5	Hachinohe, Aomori	2014–2018	–	J2
Matsumoto Yamaga	2010	2	Matsumoto, Nagano	2010–2011	–	J3
YKK AP	2001	7	Kurobe, Toyama	2001–2007	–	Defunct, merged into Kataller Toyama
Yokohama FC	1999	2	Yokohama, Kanagawa	1999–2000	2000	J2
Zweigen Kanazawa	2010	4	Kanazawa, Ishikawa	2010–2013	–	J3

- Pink background denotes clubs that were most recently promoted to J3 League.
- Gray background indicates clubs most recently relegated to JRL

== Championship, promotion and relegation history ==
=== Most successful clubs ===
Clubs in bold compete in JFL as of 2026–27 season. Clubs in italic no longer exist.

Club	Winners	Runners-up	Winning seasons	Runners-up seasons
**Honda FC**	11	5	2001, 2002, 2006, 2008, 2014, 2016, 2017, 2018, 2019, 2023, 2025	1999, 2000, 2003, 2004, 2021
Sagawa Shiga	3	1	2007, 2009, 2011	2010
Otsuka Pharmaceuticals	2	1	2003, 2004	2001
Yokohama FC	2	0	1999, 2000	
Nagano Parceiro	1	2	2013	2011, 2012
Sony Sendai	1	1	2015	2019
Ehime FC	1	0	2005	
Gainare Tottori	1	0	2010	
V-Varen Nagasaki	1	0	2012	
**Verspah Oita**	1	0	2020	
Iwaki FC	1	0	2021	
Nara Club	1	0	2022	
Tochigi City FC	1	0	2024	
Sagawa Express Tokyo	0	2		2002, 2006
FC Osaka	0	2		2018, 2022
YKK AP	0	1		2005
Rosso Kumamoto	0	1		2007
Tochigi SC	0	1		2008
**Yokogawa Musashino**	0	1		2009
Kamatamare Sanuki	0	1		2013
SP Kyoto FC	0	1		2014
Vanraure Hachinohe	0	1		2015
Ryutsu Keizai Dragons	0	1		2016
**ReinMeer Aomori**	0	1		2017
Tegevajaro Miyazaki	0	1		2020
**Briobecca Urayasu**	0	1		2023
Kochi United SC	0	1		2024
Reilac Shiga	0	1		2025

=== Third-tier league: 1999–2013 ===
Season	Champions	Runners-up	Promoted to J2 after the season	Relegated from J2 after the season	Promoted from Regional Leagues before the season	Relegated to Regional Leagues after the season
1999	Yokohama F.C.	Honda F.C.	Mito HollyHock	—	Yokogawa Denki	None
2000	Yokohama F.C.	Honda F.C.	Yokohama FC	—	Tochigi S.C. Shizuoka Kengyo University F.C. Alo's Hokuriku; F.C. Kyoken	None
2001	Honda F.C.	Otsuka Pharmaceutical F.C.	None	—	Sagawa Express Tokyo S.C. YKK AP F.C. S.C. Tottori; Ehime F.C. NTT West Japan-Kumamoto	None
2002	Honda F.C.	Sagawa Express Tokyo S.C.	None	—	Sagawa Express Osaka S.C. Profesor Miyazaki	Shizuoka Kengyo University F.C. Alouette Kumamoto; Profesor Miyazaki
2003	Otsuka Pharmaceutical F.C.	Honda F.C.	None	—	Sagawa Printing S.C.	Jatco F.C. (disbanded); F.C. Kyoto BAMB 1993 (F.C. Kyoken)
2004	Otsuka Pharmaceutical F.C.	Honda F.C.	Otsuka (Tokushima Vortis); Kusatsu	—	Thespa Kusatsu; Gunma Horikoshi	Kokushikan University F.C. (forced to withdraw due to scandal)
2005	Ehime F.C.	YKK AP F.C.	Ehime	—	Ryutsu Keizai University F.C. Mitsubishi Mizushima FC; Honda Lock S.C.	None
2006	Honda F.C.	Sagawa Express Tokyo S.C.	None	—	JEF United Ichihara Chiba B Rosso Kumamoto; F.C. Ryukyu	Honda Lock SC (Sagawa Express Tokyo and Osaka clubs merge to form a single club)
2007	Sagawa Express S.C.	Rosso Kumamoto	Kumamoto; Gifu	—	TDK S.C. F.C. Gifu	(Alo's Hokuriku and YKK AP merge to form Kataller Toyama)
2008	Honda FC	Tochigi SC	Tochigi SC; Fagiano Okayama; Kataller Toyama	—	Fagiano Okayama; New Wave Kitakyushu; MIO Biwako Shiga	None
2009	Sagawa Shiga	Tokyo Musashino City	New Wave Kitakyushu	—	Machida Zelvia; V-Varen Nagasaki; Honda Lock	Mitsubishi Motors Mizushima (voluntary withdrawal); FC Kariya
2010	Gainare Tottori	Sagawa Shiga	Tottori	—	Matsumoto Yamaga; Hitachi Tochigi Uva; Zweigen Kanazawa	Ryutsu Keizai University
2011	Sagawa Shiga	Nagano Parceiro	Machida; Matsumoto	—	Kamatamare Sanuki; Nagano Parceiro	JEF Reserves (disbanded); Arte Takasaki (disbanded)
2012	V-Varen Nagasaki	Nagano Parceiro	Nagasaki	Machida Zelvia	YSCC Yokohama; Fujieda MYFC; Hoyo AC Elan Oita	Sagawa Shiga (disbanded)
2013	Nagano Parceiro	Kamatamare Sanuki	Sanuki	—	SC Sagamihara; Fukushima United	None
2013	Nagano Parceiro	Kamatamare Sanuki	*The following teams were admitted to the new J3 League: Nagano Parceiro, SC Sagamihara, Machida Zelvia, Zweigen Kanazawa, Blaublitz Akita, FC Ryukyu, YSCC Yokohama, Fujieda MYFC and Fukushima United.			

=== Fourth-tier league: 2014– ===
From 2014 to 2018, the Japan Football League switched to the Apertura and Clausura format to determine the champions. In 2019, the single-table format returned.

Season	Champions	Runners-up	Promoted to J3 after the season	Relegated from J3 after the season	Promoted from Regional Leagues before the season	Relegated to Regional Leagues after the season
2014	Honda FC (A)	SP Kyoto FC (C)	Renofa Yamaguchi	—	Fagiano Okayama Next; Kagoshima United; Vanraure Hachinohe; Azul Claro Numazu; Maruyasu Industries SC; Renofa Yamaguchi	None
2015	Sony Sendai (C)	Vanraure Hachinohe (A)	Kagoshima United	—	Nara Club; FC Osaka; Ryutsu Keizai Dragons	SP Kyoto FC (disbanded)
2016	Honda FC (C)	Ryutsu Keizai Dragons (A)	Azul Claro Numazu	—	ReinMeer Aomori; Briobecca Urayasu	Fagiano Okayama Next (disbanded)
2017	Honda FC (1)	ReinMeer Aomori (2)	None	—	FC Imabari; Veertien Mie	Briobecca Urayasu; Tochigi Uva
2018	Honda FC (1)	FC Osaka (2)	Vanraure Hachinohe	—	Cobaltore Onagawa; Tegevajaro Miyazaki	Cobaltore Onagawa
2019	Honda FC	Sony Sendai	FC Imabari	—	Matsue City FC; Suzuka Unlimited	Ryutsu Keizai Dragons
2020^{†}	Verspah Oita	Tegevajaro Miyazaki	Miyazaki	—	Iwaki FC; Kochi United SC	None
2021	Iwaki FC	Honda FC	Iwaki	—	Tiamo Hirakata; FC Kariya	FC Kariya
2022	Nara Club	FC Osaka	Nara; FC Osaka	—	Criacao Shinjuku	Kagura Shimane (disbanded)
2023	Honda FC	Briobecca Urayasu	None	—	Briobecca Urayasu; Okinawa SV	None
2024	Tochigi City FC	Kochi United SC	Tochigi City; Kochi	YSCC Yokohama; Iwate Grulla Morioka	Tochigi City FC	Sony Sendai FC (disbanded)
2025	Honda FC	Reilac Shiga	Shiga	Azul Claro Numazu	Asuka FC	Atletico Suzuka Club; Asuka
2026–27					J-Lease FC; Vonds Ichihara	

A = Apertura champion, C = Clausura champion, 1 = Won both stages, 2 = Earned the second most points total in the overall table if 1 applies.
† Only second half of season was played due to the COVID-19 pandemic in Japan.

== JFL records and statistics ==
As of December 2023.

In bold the ones who are actually playing in JFL. In italic the ones who are still active in other league.

Caps
No.	Player	Caps	Career
1	Daiki Koyama	389	2000–2002, 2004–2017
2	Hajime "Gen" Nakamura	374	2003–2017
3	Takanori Kanamori	349	2008–2022
4	Hirotaka Nagatomi	348	2006–2021
5	Kazuhisa Hamaoka	338	2001–2005, 2007, 2010–2013, 2014–2016
6	Takuya Tomiyama	333	1999–2012
7	Masayuki Ishii	314	1999–2010
8	Takahito Seta	313	2008–2018
9	Keisuke Iwata	312	2009–2020
10	Junya Nitta	307	1999–2011

Goals
#	Player	Goals	Career
1	Junya Nitta	146	1999–2011
2	Tatsuya Furuhashi	127	1999–2004, 2014–2020
3	Kodai Suzuki	111	2000–2010
4	Sho Gokyu	104	2006–2007, 2009–2013, 2015
5	Mitsuru Hasegawa	103	2001–2008
6	Masatoshi Matsuda	100	2014–2015
7	Hajime "Gen" Nakamura	94	2003–2017
8	Takehiro Hayashi	91	1999–2004
9	Shoma Mizunaga	83	2005–2006, 2009–2012, 2018–2020
10	Tomohiro Ito	71	1999–2008

== See also ==
- Sport in Japan
  - Football in Japan
    - Women's football in Japan
- Japan Football Association (JFA)

Soccer/Football
League system

- Japanese association football league system
- J.League
  - J1 League (Tier 1)
  - J2 League (Tier 2)
  - J3 League (Tier 3)
- Regional Champions League (Promotion playoffs to JFL)
- Regional Leagues (Tier 5/6)

Domestic cup

- Fujifilm Super Cup (Super Cup)
- Emperor's Cup (National Cup)
- J.League YBC Levain Cup (League Cup)

Futsal

- F.League
  - F1 League (Tier 1)
  - F2 League (Tier 2)
- JFA Futsal Championship (National Cup)
- F.League Ocean Cup (League Cup)

Beach soccer

- Beach Soccer Championship (National Cup)

Sporting positions
Preceded by Japan Football League Division 2	Third tier of Japanese football 1999–2013	Succeeded by J3 League
