= Takehiro Hayashi =

Japanese footballer

Personal information
- Full name: Takehiro Hayashi
- Date of birth: January 23, 1976 (age 50)
- Place of birth: Chiba, Japan
- Height: 1.84 m (6 ft 1/2 in)
- Position: Forward

Youth career
- 1994–1997: Rissho University

Senior career*
Years	Team	Apps	(Gls)
1998–2006	Tokushima Vortis	151	(91)
Total		151	(91)
- * Club domestic league appearances and goals

Takehiro Hayashi (林 威宏, Hayashi Takehiro; born January 23, 1976) is a former Japanese football player.

== Club statistics ==
Club performance			League		Cup		Total	
Season	Club	League	Apps	Goals	Apps	Goals	Apps	Goals
Japan			League		Emperor's Cup		Total	
1998	Otsuka Pharmaceutical	Football League	12	0			12	0
1999	Otsuka Pharmaceutical	Football League	18	10			18	10
2000	Otsuka Pharmaceutical	Football League	22	16			22	16
2001	Otsuka Pharmaceutical	Football League	27	20			27	20
2002	Otsuka Pharmaceutical	Football League	16	12			16	12
2003	Otsuka Pharmaceutical	Football League	25	12			25	12
2004	Otsuka Pharmaceutical	Football League	29	21			29	21
2005	Tokushima Vortis	J2 League	1	0	0	0	1	0
2006	Tokushima Vortis	J2 League	1	0	1	0	2	0
Total	Japan		151	91	1	0	152	91
Career total			151	91	1	0	152	91
