= Sagawa Shiga FC =

Association football club in Japan

Sagawa Shiga F.C. 佐川急便滋賀FC
- Full name: Sagawa Shiga Football Club
- Founded: 2007; 19 years ago
- Ground: Sagawa Express Moriyama Stadium; Moriyama City, Shiga
- League: Japan Football League
- 2012: 3rd (withdrew)
Home colours	Away colours

Sagawa Shiga Football Club (佐川急便滋賀フットボールクラブ, Sagawa Shiga Futtobōru Kurabu), formerly Sagawa Express Soccer Club (佐川急便サッカークラブ, Sagawa Kyūbin Sakkā Kurabu), was an amateur Japanese football club based in Moriyama, Shiga. They were members of the Japan Football League (JFL).

== History ==
The club formed in 2007 from a merger of two Sagawa Express corporation football clubs in JFL; Sagawa Express Tokyo S.C. and Sagawa Express Osaka S.C. The Tokyo side had been in JFL since 2001 and the Osaka side since 2002. The announcement of the merger was on September 14, 2006, and its base would be moved to Shiga prefecture, the company's corporate base. Blue and silver were their team colours. Their home stadium was the Sagawa Express Moriyama Stadium in Moriyama, Shiga.

This merger of two strong teams in JFL proved successful. In their first year of competition in JFL they won the championship and eight of their players selected in JFL Best Eleven 2007. With the promotion of F.C. Mi-O Biwako Kusatsu to JFL, there will be Shiga derby matches in 2008 season. F.C. Mi-O also formed from Sagawa Express Kyoto S.C in 2005. Their first derby match will be played on March 16 at Moriyama and it is also the opening match of the 2008 season.

In 2008 the name of the team changed to Sagawa Shiga FC in a bid to get the support of the local community.

On 16 October 2012, it was reported that Sagawa Shiga had notified JFL organization about their intention of withdrawal from JFL as of the end of 2012 season. The club currently maintains a football academy.

== Club records ==
Season	Belonging league	Matches	Points	Win	Draw	Lose	Goal difference	Goals For	Goals Against	Position
2007	JFL	34	83	26	5	3	+50	81	31	1
2008	JFL	34	47	12	11	11	+6	53	47	12
2009	JFL	34	66	19	9	6	+26	62	36	1
2010	JFL	34	62	17	11	6	+34	62	28	2
2011	JFL	34	70	23	1	9	+26	60	34	1
2012	JFL	32	57	16	9	7	+24	61	37	3

== See also ==
- Sagawa Express Osaka S.C.
- Sagawa Express Tokyo S.C.
