= FC Kariya =

Japanese football club

FC Kariya FC刈谷
- Full name: Football Club Kariya
- Nickname: F.C. Kariya
- Founded: 1949; 77 years ago (as Nippon Denso Soccer Club)
- Ground: Wave Stadium Kariya; Kariya, Aichi
- Capacity: 2,602
- Chairman: Jin Hase
- Manager: Koji Kadota (ja)
- League: Tōkai Adult Soccer League D1
- 2023: 2nd of 8; Lost JRCL play-offs
- Website: www.fckariya.jp
Home colours	Away colours

FC Kariya (FC刈谷, Efu Shī Kariya) are a Japanese football club based in Kariya, Aichi. They're aiming to gain professional status. Since the 2022 season, after being relegated from the Japan Football League, they are currently playing in the Tōkai Adult Soccer League, which part of Japanese Regional Leagues.

== History ==
The club was founded in 1949 as Nippon Denso Soccer Club. They mainly played in the Tōkai Regional League; Kariya was already represented in the Japan Soccer League by the club belonging to Toyota Industries (not to be confused with nearby Toyota Motors, which is the club that became Nagoya Grampus).

Nippon Denso were finally promoted to the Japan Football League in 1996. They played their first JFL season under new name DENSO Soccer Club because of the change of their owner's name.

DENSO relinquished the ownership at the end of the 2005 season and non-profit organisation Kaeru Sports Club took over. Their name F.C. Kariya was chosen from entries from the public. Despite this change of ownership, F.C. Kariya did not show much ambition for J. League status in subsequent campaigns and finished in 17th place on the 2009 season of the Japan Football League, being relegated back to the Tokai Regional League after losing a promotion/relegation series to the more ambitious Zweigen Kanazawa.

In 2015, Kariya became champions of the Tōkai Adult Soccer League and participated in the 2015 Regional League promotion play-offs, reaching the Top 4, but not the promotion back to JFL. They also featured three times in the Emperor's Cup, reaching 2nd round both in 2007 and in 2012.

In 2020 season, the Tōkai Adult Soccer League was held in an irregular knock-out format due to the COVID-19 pandemic. Led by a new manager Koji Kadota, FC Kariya won the tournament to qualify for the Regional Champions League, and finished on it as runners-up, resulting in their return to the Japan Football League comeback for the 2021 season, after 11 seasons of unsuccessful promotion attempts.

On the same season, they were relegated back to the Tōkai Adult Soccer League. On 2022, they already won the tournament, pushing themselves to another promotion race with other 11 teams highly ranked either at their Regional Leagues or at the 2022 Shakaijin Cup, at the 2022 Regional Champions League. On the first group stage round, FC Kariya did well, with a 3-match unbeaten streak to secure a place in the Final Round. The top 2 of the 4 teams at the group would qualify to the JFL. In the 2nd of the 3 matches to be played at it, FC Kariya lost their promotion hopes for the season, as they lost their first two matches and couldn't overcome a 4-point gap within just a game left.

== Shirt and colours ==
FC Kariya's shirt features the red sash (or Aka Dasuki in Japanese). This design was originally adopted by Kariya High School's soccer club who introduced the sport to the area in the Taishō period. Because of this, the red sash is regarded as the symbolic design of Kariya's football.

== Stadiums ==
They play their home games mainly at Kariya Municipal Athletic Park, but Toyohashi City Iwata General Ballgame Stadium and Nagoya City Port Soccer Stadium are also used a couple of times a year. They practice at Denso Ikeda Factory ground which is not open to the public because it is in Denso's factory site.

== League and cup record ==
Here are listed only the seasons disputed as "FC Kariya"'.

Champions	Runners-up	Third place	Promoted	Relegated

League												Emperor's Cup	Shakaijin Cup
Season	Division	Tier	Pos.	GP	W	D	L	F	A	GD	Pts	Emperor's Cup	Shakaijin Cup
2006	Japan Football; League	3	13th	34	8	8	18	46	63	-17	32	Did not qualify	Not eligible
2007	Japan Football; League	3	16th	34	8	4	22	36	59	-23	28	2nd round	Not eligible
2008	Japan Football; League	3	8th	34	13	12	9	47	40	7	51	Did not qualify	Not eligible
2009	Japan Football; League	3	17th	34	7	10	17	26	51	-25	31	1st round	Not eligible
2010	Tōkai Adult Soccer; League (Div. 1)	4	2nd	16	10	5	1	38	9	29	35	Did not qualify	Did not play
2011	Tōkai Adult Soccer; League (Div. 1)	4	3rd	14	6	3	5	28	24	4	21	Did not qualify	2nd round
2012	Tōkai Adult Soccer; League (Div. 1)	4	4th	14	5	3	6	23	17	6	18	2nd round	Quarter final
2013	Tōkai Adult Soccer; League (Div. 1)	4	3rd	14	8	1	5	35	21	14	25	Did not qualify	Did not play
2014	Tōkai Adult Soccer; League (Div. 1)	5	4th	14	6	2	6	19	19	0	20	Did not qualify	1st round
2015	Tōkai Adult Soccer; League (Div. 1)	5	1st	14	10	3	1	34	13	21	33	Did not qualify	Quarter-final
2016	Tōkai Adult Soccer; League (Div. 1)	5	1st	14	13	1	0	43	7	36	40	Did not qualify	Did not play
2017	Tōkai Adult Soccer; League (Div. 1)	5	2nd	14	10	3	1	35	15	20	33	Did not qualify	Did not play
2018	Tōkai Adult Soccer; League (Div. 1)	5	1st	14	12	1	1	33	9	24	37	Did not qualify	Runner-up
2019	Tōkai Adult Soccer; League (Div. 1)	5	1st	14	12	0	2	44	14	30	36	1st round	Quarter-final
2020	Tōkai Adult Soccer; League (Div. 1)	5	1st	-	-	-	-	-	-	-	-	Did not qualify	Was not held
2021	Japan Football; League	4	17th	32	4	6	22	26	55	-29	18	1st round	Not eligible
2022	Tōkai Adult Soccer; League (Div. 1)	5	1st	16	11	3	2	39	11	28	36	Did not qualify	Did not play
2023	Tōkai Adult Soccer; League (Div. 1)	5	2nd	14	10	3	1	27	9	18	33	Did not qualify	Champions
2024	Tōkai Adult Soccer; League (Div. 1)	5	2nd	14	10	1	3	29	14	15	31		
2025	Tōkai Adult Soccer; League (Div. 1)	5	3rd	14	6	5	3	21	12	9	23		

Key

- Pos. = Position in league; GP = Games played; W = Games won; D = Games drawn; L = Games lost; F = Goals scored; A = Goals conceded; GD = Goals difference; Pts = Points gained

== Honours ==
Nippon Denso SC (1949–2005) / FC Kariya (2006–present)

FC Kariya honours
Honour	No.	Years
Tōkai Adult Soccer League	6	1993, 1995, 2015, 2016, 2019, 2022
Japanese Regional Champions League	2	1993, 1995
Shakaijin Cup	1	2023

== Current squad ==
As of 23 August 2023.

Note: Flags indicate national team as defined under FIFA eligibility rules; some limited exceptions apply. Players may hold more than one non-FIFA nationality.

No.	Pos.	Nation	Player
1	GK	JPN	Takayuki Shirai
2	DF	JPN	Ryosuke Oshima
3	DF	JPN	Teruyuki Moniwa
4	MF	JPN	Yuya Hamada
5	MF	JPN	Shuto Izuka
6	DF	JPN	Kazunari Ishida
7	MF	JPN	Tatsuki Onuma
8	MF	JPN	Masayuki Saito
9	FW	JPN	Naoto Suzuki
10	MF	JPN	Ryo Ozaki
11	FW	JPN	Kohei Wataya
13	DF	JPN	Aoi Chishima
14	MF	JPN	Kento Ozawa
15	FW	JPN	Masato Nomura

No.	Pos.	Nation	Player
16	GK	JPN	Yusei Narita
17	MF	JPN	Ryo Fukuda
18	MF	JPN	Yushin Mochizuki
19	DF	JPN	Manato Akimoto
20	FW	JPN	Yutaka Ito
21	GK	JPN	Takuya Kojima
22	DF	JPN	Shungo Imasaka
23	MF	JPN	Shinichiro Sonoda
24	DF	JPN	Keishin Shirai
25	DF	JPN	Kimiaki Nishikawa
26	MF	JPN	Kaito Kinoshita
28	MF	JPN	Ren Iijima
29	MF	JPN	Chihiro Otomo
30	MF	JPN	Ryoto Kamiya
