= Sagawa Express Osaka SC =

Sagawa Express Osaka 佐川急便大阪
- Full name: Sagawa Express Osaka Soccer Club
- Nickname(s): –
- Founded: 1965 (as Hokusetsu Kemari-dan)
- Dissolved: 2007
- Ground: Nagai Aid Stadium; Higashisumiyoshi-ku, Osaka
- Capacity: 15,000
- Chairman: ?
- Manager: Masafumi Nakaguchi
- League: Japan Football League
- 2006: 3
Home colours	Away colours

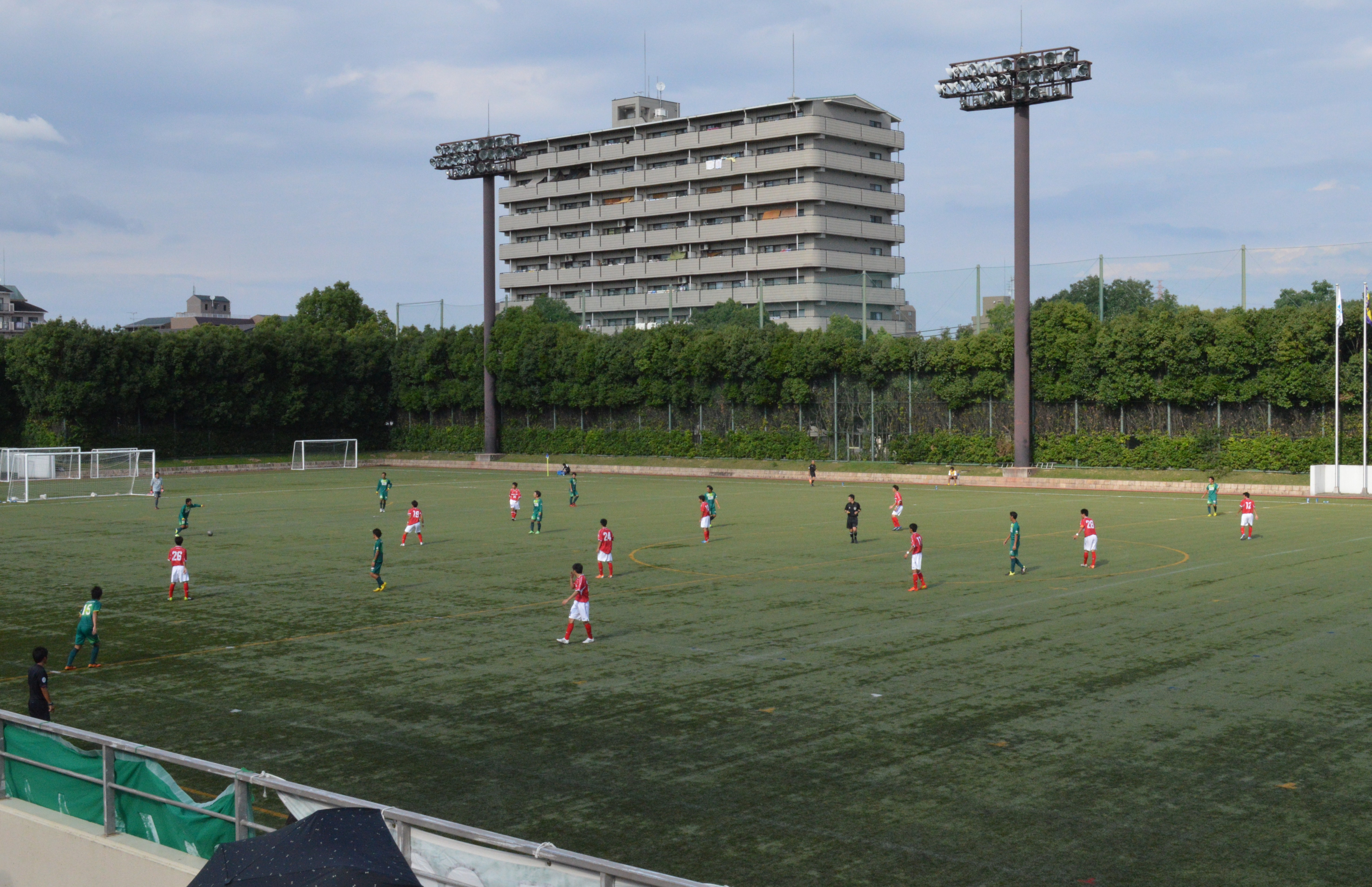

Sagawa Express Osaka Soccer Club(佐川急便大阪サッカー部) was a Japanese football club based in Higashisumiyoshi-ku, Osaka.

== History ==
They were founded in 1965 and played in the Japan Football League (JFL) from 2002 to 2007, when they merged with Sagawa Express Tokyo S.C. to form what is now Sagawa Shiga F.C. As the name implies they were run by Sagawa Express, a Japanese transportation business.

Prior to joining the JFL the team played in the Kansai Soccer League, in which they won four championships. They joined the JFL in 2002, one year after their Tokyo counterparts did. They did not repeat their earlier success after the switch. In 2007 the team announced the merger with Sagawa Express Tokyo to form Sagawa Express S.C., now Sagawa Shiga F.C., based in Shiga Prefecture.

== Honors ==
- Kansai Soccer League: 4

1997, 1998, 2000, 2001
