= Sagawa Express Tokyo SC =

Industrial-league association football team in Japan

Sagawa Express Tokyo 佐川急便東京
- Full name: Sagawa Express Tokyo Soccer Club
- Founded: 1991
- Dissolved: 2006
- League: Japan Football League
- 2006: 2nd
Home colours	Away colours

Sagawa Express Tokyo S.C. was a Japanese football club based in Kōtō, Tokyo. The team was founded in 1991 and was a member of the Japan Football League from 2001 to 2007, when it merged with Sagawa Express Osaka S.C. to form Sagawa Shiga F.C. As the name implied the club was organized by Sagawa Express.

== History ==
This team had its origin in two preceding football teams, one is Sagawa Express Tokyo branch office soccer association founded in 1991, and the other is Tokyo Fulie Soccer Club, founded in 1993, which consisted of players that were former members of All Nippon Airways (Yokohama) Soccer Club and former Yokohama Flügels.

In 1999, Sagawa Express Soccer Club had absorbed the Tokyo Fulie Soccer Club which was active in Tokyo league division 1 at the time and then came to be present form of Sagawa Express Tokyo (Since Sagawa Express Soccer Club was belonging to Tokyo League Division 4 when the absorption took place, the team's leading members were actually composed of members of Tokyo Furie mostly, although the team name was Sagawa Express Soccer Club.) For expressing this team circumstance, the team name was "Sagawa Express Tokyo Fulie Soccer Club" for a while.

In 2000, Sagawa Express Tokyo had won final match of local league championship and achieved its promotion to JFL. In this match, Sagawa Express Tokyo entered the championship with a team name of "Sagawa Express Soccer Club" for meaning that it was the representative team of several Sagawa football teams co-existing in Sagawa Express corp. at that time. However, in 2002, Sagawa Express Osaka Soccer Club was also promoted to JFL, thus to distinguish each team, the team name of Sagawa Express Soccer Club was changed back to "Sagawa Express Tokyo Soccer Club".

Sagawa Express Tokyo was one of the very strong teams in JFL aiming for upper-rank of the same. Since the team was formed by the absorption of former Tokyo Fulie members, there existed former J. League players and efficient amateur players in it. In the All-Japan football championship for the Emperor's Cup in 2001, Sagawa Express Tokyo defeated Nagoya Grampus Eight of J1 League 4–0. This victory became the talk of the people and called as "best upset ever recorded". In 2003, Sagawa Express Tokyo competed with Otsuka F.C. and Honda F.C. for championship of the season in JFL for a while.

However, in 2004, before the season opening of the JFL, there was an incident where the manager in charge at that time was arrested for committing solicitation of sex from a child and being deprived the rights of instructor permanently from the Japan Football Association.

In 2006, at the Sagawa sports festival which was held among its company, Sagawa Express Tokyo had a match with Sagawa Express Osaka, which was also belonging to JFL, and could not win against Sagawa Express Osaka after the match went into a penalty shoot-out.

On 14 September 2006, it was announced that Sagawa Express Tokyo and Sagawa Express Osaka would be merged and its base would be moved to Shiga prefecture. Further, it was announced that said merged team will make new start from the beginning of 2007 with new team name "Sagawa Express S.C."

Its base stadium was Yumenoshima athletic field of Kōtō district, Tokyo (seating capacity is 5,000), and the matches mainly took place there. However, the matches were also frequently held at other stadiums in the Tokyo metropolitan area such as Edogawa and Nishigaoka.

== Club records ==
Season	League	Matches	Points	Win	Draw	Loss	Goal difference	Final rank
2000	Kanto League	18	42	14	0	4	+38	1
2001	JFL	30	62	19	5	6	+37	4
2002	JFL	17	39	12	3	2	+27	2
2003	JFL	30	52	15	7	8	+17	5
2004	JFL	30	44	13	5	12	+4	7
2005	JFL	30	52	16	4	10	+22	6
2006	JFL	34	75	23	6	5	+61	2

== See also ==
- Sagawa Express Osaka S.C.
- Sagawa Shiga F.C.
