= 2013 V-Varen Nagasaki season =

V-Varen Nagasaki
2013 season
- Chairman: Ban Noriyuki Miyata
- Manager: Takuya Takagi
- J. League Division 2: 3rd
- Emperor's Cup: TBD
- Top goalscorer: League: Kōichi Satō; Shoma Mizunaga (4 goals); All: Kōichi Satō; Shoma Mizunaga (4 goals)
- Highest home attendance: 18,153 vs Gamba Osaka (9 March 2013)
- Lowest home attendance: 2,093 vs Kataller Toyama (20 March 2013)
- Average home league attendance: 5,508
Home colours	Away colours

The 2013 V-Varen Nagasaki season was V-Varen Nagasaki's first season in the J. League Division 2 after winning the 2012 Japan Football League and gaining promotion.

== Key events ==
- 20 December 2012: Takuya Takagi is announced as the new coach of V-Varen Nagasaki.
- 3 March: V-Varen Nagasaki play their first ever professional match in the J. League Division 2 against Fagiano Okayama at the Kanko Stadium in which the club drew 1–1. Kōichi Satō scored the club's first goal in the J. League Division 2 in the 25th minute of that match.
- 10 March: Nagasaki play their first ever Division 2 match at home at the Nagasaki Athletic Stadium in which they took on 2008 AFC Champions League winners Gamba Osaka in front of 18,153 people.
- 20 March: V-Varen Nagasaki win their first ever match in Division 2 when they defeated Kataller Toyama at home.

== Transfers ==
In:

Out:

Note: Flags indicate national team as has been defined under FIFA eligibility rules. Players may hold more than one non-FIFA nationality.

No.	Pos.	Nation	Player
—	MF	JPN	Shuto Kono (on loan from F.C. Tokyo)
—	MF	JPN	Yudai Inoue (from Oita Trinita)
—	DF	JPN	Takahiro Yamaguchi (on loan from Shonan Bellmare)
—	FW	JPN	Yusei Ogasawara (from Ehime)
—	FW	JPN	Kōichi Satō (from F.C. Gifu)
—	MF	JPN	Sai Kanakubo (from Mito HollyHock)
—	DF	JPN	Ryota Takasugi (from Ehime)
—	GK	JPN	Fumiya Iwamaru (from Roasso Kumamoto)
—	MF	JPN	Kohei Shimoda (from F.C. Tokyo)
—	DF	KOR	Oh Chang-Hyun (from Avispa Fukuoka)
—	MF	JPN	Kohei Yamada (Free Agent)
—	DF	KOR	Cho Min-Woo (on loan from (South Korea) FC Seoul)

No.	Pos.	Nation	Player
—	DF	JPN	Shogo Nakatsuru (to Fujieda MYFC)
—	MF	JPN	Shohei Yamamoto (to Kamatamare Sanuki)
—	MF	JPN	Yoshiki Nakai (to Sagawa Printing S.C.)
—	MF	JPN	Junya Yamashiro (to Zweigen Kanazawa)
—	GK	JPN	Kenichi Kondo (released)
—	DF	KOR	Jae-Eun Choi (released)
—	DF	JPN	Masakatsu Tanaka (released)
—	MF	JPN	Yasunobu Matsuoka (released)

== J. League Division 2 ==
3 March 2013 Round 1	Fagiano Okayama	1–1	V-Varen Nagasaki	Okayama
15:34 JST	Arata 90'	Report	Satō 25'	Stadium: Kanko Stadium; Attendance: 9,687; Referee: Tetsuro Yoshida

10 March 2013 Round 2	V-Varen Nagasaki	1–3	Gamba Osaka	Nagasaki
13:03 JST	Mizuanga 80'	Report	Hirai 13', 24'; Futagawa 35'	Stadium: Nagasaki Athletic Stadium; Attendance: 18,153; Referee: Koichiro Fukushima

17 March 2013 Round 3	Montedio Yamagata	2–0	V-Varen Nagasaki	Tendō, Yamagata
16:04 JST	Yamada 12'; Miyasaka 61'	Report		Stadium: ND Soft Stadium Yamagata; Attendance: 7,161; Referee: Shoichiro Mikami

20 March 2013 Round 4	V-Varen Nagasaki	1–0	Kataller Toyama	Nagasaki
13:04 JST	Satō 72'	Report		Stadium: Nagasaki Athletic Stadium; Attendance: 2,093; Referee: Kenji Ogiya

24 March 2013 Round 5	Matsumoto Yamaga	1–1	V-Varen Nagasaki	Matsumoto, Nagano
13:03 JST	Funayama 90'	Report	Mizuanga 65'	Stadium: Matsumotodaira Football Stadium; Attendance: 9,038; Referee: Masaaki Toma

31 March 2013 Round 6	V-Varen Nagasaki	3–1	Gainare Tottori	Nagasaki
15:03 JST	Satō 32'; Ogasawara 43'; Mizuranga 51'	Report	Nagira 67'	Stadium: Nagasaki Athletic Stadium; Attendance: 2,467; Referee: Haruki Hidaka

7 April 2013 Round 7	Tokushima Vortis	1–2	V-Varen Nagasaki	Naruto, Tokushima
13:04 JST	Own Goal	Report	Kanakubo 41'; Mizunaga 90+4'	Stadium: Pocarisweat Stadium; Attendance: 3,488; Referee: Eiji Kawai

14 April 2013 Round 8	V-Varen Nagasaki	1–0	Roasso Kumamoto	Nagasaki
13:05 JST	Takasugi 85'	Report		Stadium: Nagasaki Athletic Stadium; Attendance: 5,916; Referee: Akihiko Ikeuchi

17 April 2013 Round 9	Yokohama	1–2	V-Varen Nagasaki	Kanagawa-ku, Yokohama
19:03 JST	Ōkubo 51'	Report	Kanakubo 65'; Furube 83'	Stadium: Nippatsu Mitsuzawa Stadium; Attendance: 2,690; Referee: Masuya Ueda

21 April 2013 Round 10	V-Varen Nagasaki	0–0	Consadole Sapporo	Nagasaki
13:04 JST		Report		Stadium: Nagasaki Athletic Stadium; Attendance: 3,709; Referee: Hiromichi Oka

29 April 2013 Round 11	Ehime	0–2	V-Varen Nagasaki	Matsuyama, Ehime
14:03 JST		Report	Yamada 2'; Satō 6'	Stadium: Ningineer Stadium; Attendance: 3,918; Referee: Shoichiro Mikami

3 May 2013 Round 12	V-Varen Nagasaki	1–0	Giravanz Kitakyushu	Nagasaki
13:03 JST	Kanzaki 60'	Report		Stadium: Nagasaki Athletic Stadium; Attendance: 4,336; Referee: Koji Morikawa

6 May 2013 Round 13	Mito Hollyhock	0–0	V-Varen Nagasaki	Mito, Ibaraki
13:03 JST		Report		Stadium: K's denki Stadium Mito; Attendance: 4,280; Referee: Taku Nagaya

12 May 2013 Round 14	Tochigi	2–2	V-Varen Nagasaki	Utsunomiya, Tochigi
13:03 JST	Cristiano 8'; Sugimoto 40'	Report	Yamada 18'; Takasugi 90+3'	Stadium: Tochigi Green Stadium; Attendance: 3,686; Referee: Takuya Maeda

19 May 2013 Round 15	V-Varen Nagasaki	0–1	Kyoto Sanga	Nagasaki
13:03 JST		Report	Own Goal 17'	Stadium: Nagasaki Athletic Stadium; Attendance: 3,940; Referee: Tetsuro Yoshida

26 May 2013 Round 16	V-Varen Nagasaki	2–1	JEF United	Nagasaki
13:03 JST	Inoue 55'; Kono 61'	Report	Yazawa 27'	Stadium: Nagasaki Athletic Stadium; Attendance: 3,452; Referee: Kazuyoshi Enomoto

1 June 2013 Round 17	Thespakusatsu Gunma	1–2	V-Varen Nagasaki	Maebashi, Gunma
00:00 JST	Koyanagi 60'; Endo (yellow card) 66'; Inui (yellow card) 78'	Summary	Cho Min-Woo (yellow card) 38'; Satō 41'; Inoue (yellow card) 59'; Mizunaga 90+1'	Stadium: Shoda Shoyu Stadium Gunma; Attendance: 6,186; Referee: (Japan) Shoichiro Mikami

8 June 2013 Round 18	Gifu	2–1	V-Varen Nagasaki	Gifu, Gifu
20:00 JST	Masuyama (yellow card) 3'; N'Ze (yellow card) 31'; Someya 64', 90+4'; Hattori (yellow card) 69'	Summary	Satō 5'	Stadium: Gifu Nagaragawa Stadium; Attendance: 5,211; Referee: (Japan) Atsushi Kamimura

15 June 2013 Round 19	V-Varen Nagasaki	2–1	Tokyo Verdy	Isahaya, Nagasaki
19:00 JST	Fujii 10'; Inoue (yellow card) 16'; Satō 72'	Summary	Fukui (yellow card) 26'; Kim Jong-pil (yellow card) 53'; Takahara 74'	Stadium: Nagasaki Athletic Stadium; Attendance: 5,678; Referee: (Japan) Eiji Kawai

22 June 2013 Round 20	Vissel Kobe	2–0	V-Varen Nagasaki	Kobe
19:00 JST	Tokura 38'; Popó 70'	Summary	Yamaguchi (yellow card) 42'; Cho Min-Woo (yellow card) 67'	Stadium: Home's Stadium Kobe; Attendance: 10,014; Referee: (Japan) Hiroyoshi Takayama

29 June 2013 Round 21	V-Varen Nagasaki	0–0	Avispa Fukuoka	Isahaya, Nagasaki
19:00 JST	Iwama (yellow card) 56'	Summary	Miyamoto (yellow card) 25'; Park Gon (yellow card) 74'; Funayama (yellow card) 87'	Stadium: Nagasaki Athletic Stadium; Attendance: 6,971; Referee: (Japan) Koichiro Fukushima

3 July 2013 Round 22	Giravanz Kitakyushu	1–2	V-Varen Nagasaki	Kitakyushu
20:00 JST	Hakkaku (yellow card) 39'; Kotegawa 63'; Watanabe (yellow card) 90+1'	Summary	Miyamoto 45' (o.g.); Yamaguchi 60'; Fujii (yellow card) 80'; Oh Chang-Hyun (yellow card) 90+1'	Stadium: Honjō Athletic Stadium; Attendance: 2,105; Referee: (Japan) Shoichiro Mikami

7 July 2013 Round 23	V-Varen Nagasaki	2–1	Montedio Yamagata	Isahaya, Nagasaki
19:00 JST	Yamaguchi (yellow card) 21' (goal) 32'; Takasugi 36'; Kono (yellow card) 56'; Cho Min-Woo (yellow card) 81'	Summary	Nakashima 18'	Stadium: Nagasaki Athletic Stadium; Attendance: 3,249; Referee: (Japan) Tetsuro Yoshida

14 July 2013 Round 24	V-Varen Nagasaki	1–0	Thespakusatsu Gunma	Isahaya, Nagasaki
19:00 JST	Satō 12' (yellow card) 86'; Yamada (yellow card) 52'; Takasugi (yellow card) 58'	Summary	Trinidad Lopes Ederson (yellow card) 33'	Stadium: Nagasaki Athletic Stadium; Attendance: 3,981; Referee: (Japan) Haruki Hidaka

20 July 2013 Round 25	Kataller Toyama	1–1	V-Varen Nagasaki	Toyama, Toyama
19:00 JST	Kim Young-Keun (yellow card) 20'; Funatsu (yellow card) 35'; Ikehata (yellow card) 41'; Seo Yong-Duk 86'	Summary	Ogasawara 39'; Kono (yellow card) 77'	Stadium: Toyama Athletic Stadium; Attendance: 4,141; Referee: (Japan) Yusuke Araki

=== Results summary ===
Overall								Home						Away					
Pld	W	D	L	GF	GA	GD	Pts	W	D	L	GF	GA	GD	W	D	L	GF	GA	GD
25	13	7	5	30	23	+7	46	8	2	2	14	8	+6	5	5	3	16	15	+1

Last updated: 14 July 2013.
Source: soccerway.com

=== Results by round ===
Round	1	2	3	4	5	6	7	8	9	10	11	12	13	14	15	16	17	18	19	20	21	22	23	24	25	26	27	28	29	30	31	32	33	34	35	36	37	38	39	40	41	42
Ground	A	H	A	H	A	H	A	H	A	H	A	H	A	A	H	H	A	A	H	A	H	A	H	H	A	H	H	A	A	H	A	A	H	A	A	H	H	A	H	A	H	H
Result	D	L	L	W	D	W	W	W	W	D	W	W	D	D	L	W	W	L	W	L	D	W	W	W	D																	

Updated to match(es) played on 14 July 2013. Source: soccerway.com
A = Away; H = Home; W = Win; D = Draw; L = Loss

== Squad ==
=== First-team squad ===
As of 6 April 2013

Note: Flags indicate national team as defined under FIFA eligibility rules; some limited exceptions apply. Players may hold more than one non-FIFA nationality.

No.	Pos.	Nation	Player
1	GK	JPN	Fumiya Iwamaru
2	DF	JPN	Takahiro Yamaguchi (on loan from Shonan Bellmare)
3	DF	JPN	Daisuke Fujii
4	DF	JPN	Ryota Takasugi
5	DF	JPN	Kazuya Kawabata
6	MF	JPN	Yusuke Maeda
7	MF	JPN	Shinsaku Mochidome
8	FW	JPN	Shota Matsuhashi
9	FW	JPN	Satoshi Nakayama
10	MF	JPN	Yukihiko Sato
11	MF	JPN	Daisuke Kanzaki
13	FW	JPN	Ryota Arimitsu
14	MF	JPN	Shuto Kono (on loan from F.C. Tokyo)
15	FW	JPN	Shoma Mizunaga
16	MF	JPN	Yudai Iwama

No.	Pos.	Nation	Player
17	FW	JPN	Kenta Furube
18	FW	JPN	Kōichi Satō
19	FW	JPN	Yusei Ogasawara
20	DF	JPN	Takuya Sugiyama
21	GK	JPN	Junki Kanayama
22	MF	JPN	Yudai Inoue
23	DF	NZL	Michael Fitzgerald
24	FW	JPN	Atsushi Matsuo
25	FW	JPN	Kazuya Okamura
26	MF	JPN	Sai Kanakubo
27	DF	KOR	Cho Min-Woo (on loan from FC Seoul)
28	MF	JPN	Kohei Shimoda
30	DF	KOR	Oh Chang-Hyun
31	GK	JPN	Yoshinobu Harada
33	MF	JPN	Kohei Yamada

== Technical staff ==
As of 24 May 2013

Position	Name
Manager	(Japan) Takuya Takagi
First-team coach	(Japan) Nakamura
Goalkeeper coach	(Japan) Takanori Miyoshi

== Player statistics ==
As of 27 May 2013

No.	Pos	Nat	Player	Total		J. League Division 2		Emperor's Cup	
No.	Pos	Nat	Player	Apps	Goals	Apps	Goals	Apps	Goals
1	GK	(Japan) JPN	Fumiya Iwamaru	3	0	3+0	0	0+0	0
2	DF	(Japan) JPN	Takahiro Yamaguchi	16	0	16+0	0	0+0	0
3	DF	(Japan) JPN	Daisuke Fujii	10	0	9+1	0	0+0	0
4	DF	(Japan) JPN	Ryota Takasugi	11	2	11+0	2	0+0	0
5	DF	(Japan) JPN	Kazuya Kawabata	0	0	0+0	0	0+0	0
6	MF	(Japan) JPN	Yusuke Maeda	11	0	1+10	0	0+0	0
7	MF	(Japan) JPN	Shinsaku Mochidome	1	0	0+1	0	0+0	0
8	FW	(Japan) JPN	Shota Matsuhashi	2	0	0+2	0	0+0	0
9	FW	(Japan) JPN	Satoshi Nakayama	0	0	0+0	0	0+0	0
10	MF	(Japan) JPN	Yukihiko Sato	3	0	0+3	0	0+0	0
11	MF	(Japan) JPN	Daisuke Kanzaki	7	1	6+1	1	0+0	0
13	FW	(Japan) JPN	Ryota Arimitsu	1	0	0+1	0	0+0	0
14	MF	(Japan) JPN	Shuto Kono	7	1	3+4	1	0+0	0
15	FW	(Japan) JPN	Shoma Mizunaga	16	4	13+3	4	0+0	0
16	MF	(Japan) JPN	Yudai Iwama	16	0	16+0	0	0+0	0
17	FW	(Japan) JPN	Kenta Furube	16	1	8+8	1	0+0	0
18	FW	(Japan) JPN	Kōichi Satō	16	4	12+4	4	0+0	0
19	FW	(Japan) JPN	Yusei Ogasawara	15	1	15+0	1	0+0	0
20	DF	(Japan) JPN	Takuya Sugiyama	0	0	0+0	0	0+0	0
21	GK	(Japan) JPN	Junki Kanayama	13	0	13+0	0	0+0	0
22	MF	(Japan) JPN	Yudai Inoue	15	1	14+1	1	0+0	0
23	DF	(New Zealand) NZL	Michael Fitzgerald	1	0	0+1	0	0+0	0
24	FW	(Japan) JPN	Atsushi Matsuo	1	0	0+1	0	0+0	0
25	FW	(Japan) JPN	Kazuya Okamura	1	0	0+1	0	0+0	0
26	MF	(Japan) JPN	Sai Kanakubo	14	2	12+2	2	0+0	0
27	DF	(South Korea) KOR	Cho Min-Woo	5	0	5+0	0	0+0	0
28	MF	(Japan) JPN	Kohei Shimoda	8	0	8+0	0	0+0	0
30	DF	(South Korea) KOR	Oh Chang-Hyun	1	0	0+1	0	0+0	0
31	GK	(Japan) JPN	Yoshinobu Harada	0	0	0+0	0	0+0	0
33	MF	(Japan) JPN	Kohei Yamada	13	2	10+3	2	0+0	0

=== Top Scorers ===
Place	Position	Nationality	Name	J. League Division 2	Emperor's Cup	Total
1	FW	(Japan)	Kōichi Satō	4	0	4
1	FW	(Japan)	Shoma Mizunaga	4	0	4
3	DF	(Japan)	Ryota Takasugi	2	0	2
3	MF	(Japan)	Sai Kanakubo	2	0	2
3	MF	(Japan)	Kohei Yamada	2	0	2
6	MF	(Japan)	Daisuke Kanzaki	1	0	1
6	MF	(Japan)	Kenta Furube	1	0	1
6	FW	(Japan)	Yusei Ogasawara	1	0	1
6	MF	(Japan)	Shuto Kono	1	0	1
6	MF	(Japan)	Yudai Inoue	1	0	1
			TOTALS	19	0	19

=== Disciplinary record ===
Nationality	Position	Name	J. League Division 2		Emperor's Cup		Total	
Nationality	Position	Name	Yellow card	Red card	Yellow card	Red card	Yellow card	Red card
(Japan)	DF	Daisuke Fujii	2	1	0	0	2	1
(Japan)	DF	Kohei Shimoda	1	1	0	0	1	1
(Japan)	DF	Ryota Takasugi	3	0	0	0	3	0
(Japan)	MF	Shuto Kono	2	0	0	0	2	0
(Japan)	FW	Yusei Ogasawara	2	0	0	0	2	0
(Japan)	FW	Kōichi Satō	2	0	0	0	2	0
(Japan)	DF	Takahiro Yamaguchi	2	0	0	0	2	0
(Japan)	MF	Yudai Iwama	2	0	0	0	2	0
(Japan)	GK	Junki Kanayama	1	0	0	0	1	0
(Japan)	MF	Sai Kanakubo	1	0	0	0	1	0
(Japan)	MF	Kohei Yamada	1	0	0	0	1	0
(Japan)	FW	Shoma Mizunaga	1	0	0	0	1	0
(Japan)	MF	Yusuke Maeda	1	0	0	0	1	0
(Japan)	MF	Yudai Inoue	1	0	0	0	1	0
		TOTALS	22	2	0	0	22	2

== See also ==
- 2013 in Japanese football
- List of V-Varen Nagasaki seasons
