= List of V-Varen Nagasaki players =

This list of V-Varen Nagasaki players comprises all players who have participated in at least one league match for V-Varen Nagasaki since the team's first J. League Division 2 season in 2013. Players who were in the squad but never played a first team game are not listed; players who appeared for the team in other competitions (such as the Emperor's Cup) but never actually made a J. League Division 2 appearance are noted at the bottom of the page.

== A ==
- (Japan) Ryota Arimitsu

== C ==
- (South Korea) Oh Chang-Hyun

== F ==
- (New Zealand) Michael Fitzgerald
- (Japan) Daisuke Fujii
- (Japan) Kenta Furube

== H ==
- (Japan) Yoshinobu Harada

== I ==
- (Japan) Yudai Inoue
- (Japan) Yudai Iwama
- (Japan) Fumiya Iwamaru

== K ==
- (Japan) Sai Kanakubo
- (Japan) Junki Kanayama
- (Japan) Daisuke Kanzaki
- (Japan) Kazuya Kawabata
- (Japan) Shuto Kono

== M ==
- (Japan) Yusuke Maeda
- (Japan) Shota Matsuhashi
- (Japan) Atsushi Matsuo
- (South Korea) Cho Min-Woo
- (Japan) Shoma Mizunaga
- (Japan) Shinsaku Mochidome

== N ==
- (Japan) Satoshi Nakayama

== O ==
- (Japan) Yusei Ogasawara
- (Japan) Kazuya Okamura

== S ==
- (Japan) Kōichi Satō
- (Japan) Yukihiko Sato
- (Japan) Kohei Shimoda
- (Japan) Takuya Sugiyama

== T ==
- (Japan) Ryota Takasugi

== Y ==
- (Japan) Kohei Yamada
- (Japan) Takahiro Yamaguchi
