= List of V-Varen Nagasaki seasons =

V-Varen Nagasaki is a Japanese J. League Division 2 football club based in Nagasaki. The club was established in 2005, and gained promotion to the J. League Division 2 in 2012.

== Key ==
- P = Played
- W = Games won
- D = Games drawn
- L = Games lost
- F = Goals for
- A = Goals against
- Pts = Points
- Pos = Final position
- J2L = J. League Division 2
- JFL = Japan Football League
- JRL = Japanese Regional Leagues
- R1 = Round 1
- R2 = Round 2
- R3 = Round 3

1st or W	Winners
2nd or RU	Runners-up
↑	Promoted
↓	Relegated
♦	Top scorer in division

== Seasons ==
Results of league and cup competitions by season
Season	Division	P	W	D	L	F	A	Pts	Pos	Emperor's Cup	League Cup	Competition	Result	Name	Goals
Season	League									Emperor's Cup	League Cup	Asia		Top goalscorer	
2009	JFL	34	12	8	14	38	43	44	11th	R2	—	—	—	(Japan) Ryota Arimitsu	10
2010	JFL	34	15	8	11	50	38	53	5th	R2	—	—	—	(Japan) Ryota Arimitsu	13
2011	JFL	34	15	11	7	61	44	56	5th	R2	—	—	—	(Japan) Ryota Arimitsu	19
2012	JFL ↑	34	20	7	5	57	24	67	1st	R2	—	—	—	(Japan) Shoma Mizunaga	12
2013	J2	42	19	9	14	48	40	66	6th (lost in playoff SF)	R2	—	—	—	(Japan) Kōichi Satō	12
2014	J2	42	12	16	14	45	42	52	14th	R4	—	—	—	(Japan) Kōichi Satō	12
2015	J2	42	15	15	12	42	33	60	6th (lost in playoff SF)	R2	—	—	—	(South Korea) Lee Yong-jae	10
2016	J2	47	10	17	15	39	51	47	15th	R2	—	—	—	(Japan) Ryo Nagai	17
2017	J2 ↑	42	24	8	10	59	41	80	2nd	R2	—	—	—	(Spain) Juanma	11
2018	J1 ↓	34	8	6	20	39	59	30	18th	R3	GS	—	—	(Japan) Musashi Suzuki	11
