= 2018 V-Varen Nagasaki season =

V-Varen Nagasaki
2018 season
- Head Coach: Takuya Takagi
- Stadium: Transcosmos Stadium Nagasaki
- J1 League: 18th Relegated
- Emperor's Cup: 3rd Round
Home colours	Away colours

The 2018 season was V-Varen Nagasaki's first season in the J1 League after earning promotion from the J2 League in 2017.

== Background ==
V-Varen Nagasaki had finished the previous season in second place and thus earned promotion to the pinnacle of Japanese football, the J1 League. This will be their first ever season competing in the J1 League. The club's first move in preparation for the upcoming season was the signing of experienced FC Tokyo right wingback Yūhei Tokunaga. A couple days later would see the departures of goalkeeper Yuya Miura and midfielder Kenta Furube, while right back Yusuke Murakami retired. On 11 December 2017 it was announced that midfielder Mitsuru Maruoka would return to Cerezo Osaka once his loan concludes in January.

On 22 December, Nagasaki bolstered their attack with the signing of forward Musashi Suzuki from Albirex Niigata. Three days later it was announced that Masato Kurogi, a midfielder from Ventforet Kofu who had already played for Nagasaki in 2014 and 2015, would return to the club. The next day the club announced three signings, including the signing of two goalkeepers: Kenta Tokushige from Vissel Kobe and Takuya Masuda, Nagasaki's starting goalkeeper from 2017 returning to the club on an extended loan from Sanfrecce Hiroshima. Forward Shu Hiramatsu also returned to the club on loan from Albirex Niigata. Again, the next day, the club announced that Spanish midfielder Miguel Pallardó would leave the club.

=== Squad movement ===
==== In ====
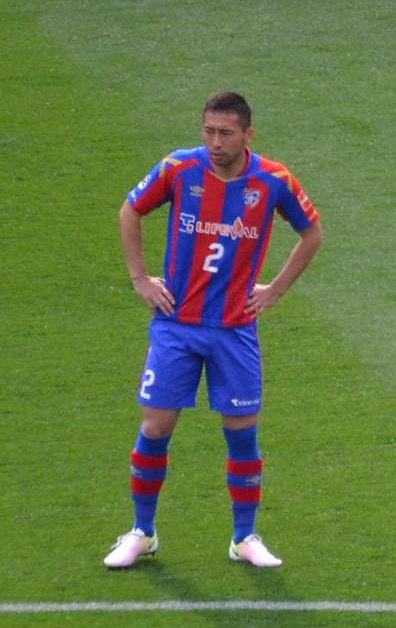
Yūhei Tokunaga was V-Varen Nagasaki's first signing for the upcoming season.

Position	Player	Last club	Date	Ref
DF	(Japan) Yūhei Tokunaga	(Japan) Tokyo	23 November 2017	
DF	(Japan) Takuto Honda	(Japan) Tokai Gakuen University	4 December 2017	
MF	(Japan) Ryo Niizato	(Japan) Juntendo University	15 December 2017	
MF	(Japan) Shunya Yoneda	(Japan) Juntendo University	15 December 2017	
FW	(Japan) Musashi Suzuki	(Japan) Albirex Niigata	22 December 2017	
MF	(Japan) Masato Kurogi	(Japan) Ventforet Kofu	25 December 2017	
GK	(Japan) Kenta Tokushige	(Japan) Vissel Kobe	26 December 2017	
GK	(Japan) Takuya Masuda	(Japan) Sanfrecce Hiroshima (loan)	26 December 2017	
FW	(Japan) Shu Hiramatsu	(Japan) Albirex Niigata (loan)	26 December 2017	

==== Out ====
Position	Player	New club	Date	Ref
GK	(Japan) Yuya Miura	Released	25 November 2017	
MF	(Japan) Kenta Furube	Released	25 November 2017	
DF	(Japan) Yusuke Murakami	Retired	28 November 2017	
MF	(Japan) Mitsuru Maruoka	(Japan) Cerezo Osaka	11 December 2017	
MF	(Spain) Miguel Pallardó	Released	27 December 2017	

== Player statistics ==
Key

No. = Squad number

Pos = Playing position

Nat. = Nationality

Apps = Appearances

GK = Goalkeeper

DF = Defender

MF = Midfielder

FW = Forward

= Yellow cards

= Red cards

Numbers in parentheses denote appearances as substitute. Players with name struck through and marked † left the club during the playing season.

No.	Pos.	Name	J1 League		Emperor's Cup		Total		Discipline	
No.	Pos.	Name	Apps	Goals	Apps	Goals	Apps	Goals	A yellow rectangular card	A red rectangular card
1	GK	(Japan) Takuya Masuda	0	0	0	0	0	0	0	0
2	DF	(Japan) Masakazu Tashiro	0	0	0	0	0	0	0	0
3	MF	(Japan) Ryutaro Iio	0	0	0	0	0	0	0	0
4	DF	(Japan) Ryota Takasugi	0	0	0	0	0	0	0	0
5	DF	(Japan) Daichi Tagami	0	0	0	0	0	0	0	0
6	MF	(Japan) Yusuke Maeda	0	0	0	0	0	0	0	0
7	MF	(Japan) Shuto Kono	0	0	0	0	0	0	0	0
8	FW	(Japan) Yu Kimura	0	0	0	0	0	0	0	0
9	FW	(Spain) Juanma	0	0	0	0	0	0	0	0
10	MF	(Japan) Yuji Yabu	0	0	0	0	0	0	0	0
13	DF	(Japan) Daichi Inui	0	0	0	0	0	0	0	0
14	MF	(Japan) Teruki Tanaka	0	0	0	0	0	0	0	0
15	MF	(Japan) Yuzuru Shimada	0	0	0	0	0	0	0	0
18	MF	(Japan) Masakazu Yoshioka	0	0	0	0	0	0	0	0
19	FW	(Japan) Takashi Sawada	0	0	0	0	0	0	0	0
20	MF	(Japan) Keita Nakamura	0	0	0	0	0	0	0	0
21	GK	(Japan) Masaya Tomizawa	0	0	0	0	0	0	0	0
22	GK	(Japan) Tatsuro Okuda	0	0	0	0	0	0	0	0
23	DF	(Japan) Fumitaka Kitatani	0	0	0	0	0	0	0	0
24	MF	(Japan) Ryusuke Hayashida	0	0	0	0	0	0	0	0
26	MF	(Japan) Teppei Usui	0	0	0	0	0	0	0	0
28	MF	(Japan) Hijiri Onaga	0	0	0	0	0	0	0	0
29	DF	(Japan) Kensuke Fukuda	0	0	0	0	0	0	0	0
35	DF	(Japan) Yuki Kagawa	0	0	0	0	0	0	0	0
37	FW	(Japan) Shu Hiramatsu	0	0	0	0	0	0	0	0
—	GK	(Japan) Kenta Tokushige	0	0	0	0	0	0	0	0
—	DF	(Japan) Yūhei Tokunaga	0	0	0	0	0	0	0	0
—	DF	(Japan) Takuto Honda	0	0	0	0	0	0	0	0
—	MF	(Japan) Masato Kurogi	0	0	0	0	0	0	0	0
—	MF	(Japan) Ryo Niizato	0	0	0	0	0	0	0	0
—	MF	(Japan) Shunya Yoneda	0	0	0	0	0	0	0	0
—	FW	(Japan) Musashi Suzuki	0	0	0	0	0	0	0	0

== See also ==
- 2018 in Japanese football
- 2018 J1 League
