= Yukihiko Sato =

Japanese footballer (born 1976)

Yukihiko Sato 佐藤 由紀彦
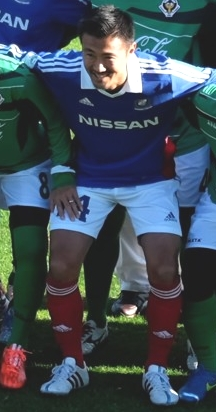

Personal information
- Full name: Yukihiko Sato
- Date of birth: May 11, 1976 (age 50)
- Place of birth: Fuji, Shizuoka, Japan
- Height: 1.77 m (5 ft 9 1/2 in)
- Position: Midfielder

Youth career
- 1992–1994: Shimizu Commercial High School

Senior career*
Years	Team	Apps	(Gls)
1995–1997	Shimizu S-Pulse	2	(0)
1998	Montedio Yamagata	29	(14)
1999–2002	FC Tokyo	104	(14)
2003–2004	Yokohama F. Marinos	43	(3)
2005–2006	Shimizu S-Pulse	12	(1)
2006–2007	Kashiwa Reysol	41	(4)
2008	Vegalta Sendai	27	(2)
2009–2014	V-Varen Nagasaki	103	(13)
Total		361	(51)
Medal record
Shimizu S-Pulse
Winner	J.League Cup	1996
Runner-up	Emperor's Cup	2005
Yokohama F. Marinos
Winner	J1 League	2003
Winner	J1 League	2004
- * Club domestic league appearances and goals

Yukihiko Sato (佐藤 由紀彦, Satō Yukihiko; born May 11, 1976) is a former Japanese football player and he is the currently assistant coach J1 League club of FC Tokyo.

== Playing career ==
Sato was born in Fuji on May 11, 1976. After graduating from Shimizu Commercial High School, he joined his local club Shimizu S-Pulse as a midfielder in 1995. However he could hardly play in the match. In 1998, he moved to Japan Football League club Montedio Yamagata. He played as regular player and was elected Rookie of the Year awards. In 1999, he moved to newly was promoted to J2 League club, FC Tokyo. He played as right side midfielder and the club was promoted to J1 League from 2000. He also was elected New Hero Award at 1999 J.League Cup. Although he played as regular player until 2001, his opportunity to play decreased behind Naohiro Ishikawa. In 2003, he moved to Yokohama F. Marinos. He played many matches as right side midfielder and the club won the champions for 2 years in a row (2003–2004). However his opportunity to play decreased behind Hayuma Tanaka in late 2004. In 2005, he moved to his first club Shimizu S-Pulse. However he could not play many matches and he moved to J2 club Kashiwa Reysol in June 2006. He played many matches and the club was promoted to J1 from 2007. In 2008, he moved to J2 club Vegalta Sendai and played in 1 season. In 2009, he move to Japan Football League club V-Varen Nagasaki and played as regular player. In 2012, although his opportunity to play decreased, the club won the champions and was promoted to J2 from 2013. He retired end of 2014 season at the age of 38.

== Club statistics ==
Club performance			League		Cup		League Cup		Continental		Total	
Season	Club	League	Apps	Goals	Apps	Goals	Apps	Goals	Apps	Goals	Apps	Goals
Japan			League		Emperor's Cup		J.League Cup		Asia		Total	
1995	Shimizu S-Pulse	J1 League	1	0	0	0	-		-		1	0
1996	Shimizu S-Pulse	J1 League	1	0	0	0	0	0	-		1	0
1997	Shimizu S-Pulse	J1 League	0	0	1	0	2	0	-		3	0
1998	Montedio Yamagata	Football League	29	14	4	3	-		-		33	17
1999	FC Tokyo	J2 League	35	6	4	2	7	2	-		46	10
2000	FC Tokyo	J1 League	28	5	0	0	2	0	-		30	5
2001	FC Tokyo	J1 League	28	3	0	0	2	0	-		30	3
2002	FC Tokyo	J1 League	13	0	0	0	3	0	-		16	0
2003	Yokohama F. Marinos	J1 League	27	1	3	0	7	1	-		37	2
2004	Yokohama F. Marinos	J1 League	16	2	1	0	7	1	4	0	28	3
2005	Shimizu S-Pulse	J1 League	12	1	0	0	1	0	-		13	1
2006	Shimizu S-Pulse	J1 League	0	0	0	0	0	0	-		0	0
2006	Kashiwa Reysol	J2 League	19	2	2	1	-		-		21	3
2007	Kashiwa Reysol	J1 League	22	2	1	0	3	0	-		26	2
2008	Vegalta Sendai	J2 League	27	2	2	0	-		-		29	2
2009	V-Varen Nagasaki	Football League	23	3	2	0	-		-		25	3
2010	V-Varen Nagasaki	Football League	26	5	2	2	-		-		28	7
2011	V-Varen Nagasaki	Football League	32	4	1	0	-		-		33	4
2012	V-Varen Nagasaki	Football League	18	1	1	0	-		-		19	1
2013	V-Varen Nagasaki	J2 League	3	0	0	0	-		-		3	0
2014	V-Varen Nagasaki	J2 League	1	0	0	0	-		-		1	0
Total			361	51	24	8	34	4	4	0	423	63
