= Michael Fitzgerald (footballer) =

New Zealand footballer

Michael Fitzgerald 舞行龍 ジェームズ
Personal information
- Full name: Michael James Fitzgerald
- Date of birth: 17 September 1988 (age 38)
- Place of birth: Tokoroa, Waikato, New Zealand
- Height: 1.85 m (6 ft 1 in)
- Position: Centre-back

Team information
- Current team: Albirex Niigata
- Number: 5

Youth career
- 2005–2007: Seiritsu Gakuen High School

Senior career*
Years	Team	Apps	(Gls)
2008–2016	Albirex Niigata	99	(1)
2009	→ Japan Soccer College (loan)	11	(0)
2010–2011	→ Zweigen Kanazawa (loan)	45	(2)
2012–2013	→ V-Varen Nagasaki (loan)	32	(4)
2017–2019	Kawasaki Frontale	3	(0)
2019–	Albirex Niigata	207	(5)

International career^{‡}
2011	New Zealand	3	(0)
Medal record
Kawasaki Frontale
Winner	J1 League	2017
Winner	J1 League	2018
Runner-up	J.League Cup	2017
Albirex Niigata
Winner	J2 League	2022
- * Club domestic league appearances and goals as of 16 August 2026 ‡ National team caps and goals as of 6 June 2011, 16:22 (UTC)

Michael James Fitzgerald (フィッツジェラルド 舞行龍 ジェームズ, Fittsujerarudo Maikeru Jēmuzu; born 17 September 1988) is a New Zealand professional footballer who plays as a centre-back and currently play for J2 League club Albirex Niigata.

== Early life ==
Fitzgerald received his secondary education at St Peter's College, Auckland (1999–2005). He is the brother of Isaac Fitzgerald.

Fitzgerald's application for Japanese citizenship was approved in May 2013. This means he can no longer play for the All Whites. His former name is Fitzgerald Michael James (フィッツジェラルド・マイケル・ジェームズ).

== Club career ==
=== Youth career ===
Fitzgerald went through the football academy at St Peter's College, in Auckland, New Zealand before moving to Japan. In 2005, Fitzgerald began his career at Seiritsu Gakuen High School with the youth team until he graduated in 2007.

=== Senior career ===
In 2008, after he had graduated from high school, Fitzgerald began his career in the J1 League, with J1 club, Albirex Niigata as part of the first team. After 2009, he transferred to JSC Niigata, Zweigen Kanazawa and V-Varen Nagasaki on loan until 2013. He made his debut for Nagasaki on 31 March 2013, coming on in the 88th minute for Shoma Mizunaga as they won 3–1.

He returned to Albirex Niigata in 2016.

In 2017, Fitzgerald transferred to Kawasaki Frontale until 2019. However, he was only able to play 3 matches in the J1 league.

In 2019, he returned to his former club, Albirex Niigata. On 23 October 2022, he helped bring his club promotion to the J1 League during the 2023 season. Albirex were crowned champions of the J2 League in 2022. On 27 December 2023, Fitzgerald's contract was extended for the 2024 season.

== International career ==
Fitzgerald made his international New Zealand debut in a 1–1 draw with China on 25 March 2011. He later made two more appearances for New Zealand in friendly matches including a 3–0 loss to Mexico and another 3–0 loss to Australia.

== Personal life ==
Fitzgerald became a naturalized Japanese citizen in 2013.

== Career statistics ==
=== Club ===
As of the start for 2025 season.

Appearances and goals by club, season and competition
Season	Club	Division	League		Emperor's Cup		J.League Cup		Asia		Total	
Season	Club	Division	Apps	Goals	Apps	Goals	Apps	Goals	Apps	Goals	Apps	Goals
2008	Albirex Niigata	J.League Div 1	0	0	0	0	0	0	—		0	0
2009	Japan Soccer College	Hokushinetsu	11	0	0	0	—		—		11	0
2010	Zweigen Kanazawa	JFL	20	1	0	0	—		—		20	1
2011	Zweigen Kanazawa	JFL	25	1	1	0	—		—		26	1
2012	V-Varen Nagasaki	JFL	31	4	1	0	—		—		32	4
2013	V-Varen Nagasaki	J.League Div 2	1	0	—		—		—		1	0
2013	Albirex Niigata	J.League Div 1	14	0	1	0	—		—		15	0
2014	Albirex Niigata	J.League Div 1	29	0	2	0	6	0	—		37	0
2015	Albirex Niigata	J1 League	29	0	0	0	8	1	—		37	1
2016	Albirex Niigata	J1 League	22	1	2	0	1	0	—		25	1
2017	Kawasaki Frontale	J1 League	0	0	0	0	0	0	2	0	2	0
2018	Kawasaki Frontale	J1 League	0	0	2	0	2	0	1	0	5	0
2019	Kawasaki Frontale	J1 League	3	0	1	0	0	0	0	0	4	0
2019	Albirex Niigata	J2 League	15	0	0	0	0	0	2	0	2	0
2020	Albirex Niigata	J2 League	38	1	0	0	0	0	0	0	38	1
2021	Albirex Niigata	J2 League	36	0	1	0	0	0	0	0	37	0
2022	Albirex Niigata	J2 League	27	1	0	0	0	0	0	0	27	1
2023	Albirex Niigata	J1 League	19	1	2	0	3	0	0	0	24	1
2024	Albirex Niigata	J1 League	32	1	2	0	5	0	0	0	39	1
2025	Albirex Niigata	J1 League	0	0	0	0	0	0	0	0	0	0
Career total			341	11	16	0	24	1	5	0	386	12

=== International ===
National team	Year	Apps	Goals
New Zealand
New Zealand	2011	3	0
New Zealand	Total	3	0

== Honours ==
=== Club ===
Kawasaki Frontale

- J1 League: 2017, 2018
- J.League Cup Runner-up: 2017
- Japanese Super Cup Runner-up: 2018

V-Varen Nagasaki

- Japan Football League: 2012

Albirex Niigata

- J2 League: 2022

=== Individual ===
- Japan Football League Team of the Year : 2012
- J2 League Team of the Year : 2022
