= Akira Toshima =

Japanese footballer

Akira Toshima 戸島 章
Personal information
- Full name: Akira Toshima
- Date of birth: October 4, 1991 (age 35)
- Place of birth: Miyagi, Japan
- Height: 1.90 m (6 ft 3 in)
- Position: Forward

Team information
- Current team: Tochigi City
- Number: 25

Youth career
- 2007–2009: Seiritsugakuenchugakko; High School

Senior career*
Years	Team	Apps	(Gls)
2010–2014	JEF United Chiba	0	(0)
2011	→ JEF Reserves (loan)	2	(0)
2013	→ Fujieda MYFC (loan)	10	(1)
2015	→ Machida Zelvia (loan)	17	(3)
2016–2017	Machida Zelvia	62	(6)
2018–2019	Yokohama FC	50	(9)
2020	→ Omiya Ardija (loan)	27	(3)
2021–	Matsumoto Yamaga	15	(0)
2022–	→ Tochigi City (loan)	0	(0)
- * Club domestic league appearances and goals as of 12:14, 1 July 2022 (UTC)

Akira Toshima (戸島 章, Toshima Akira; born October 4, 1991 in Miyagi) is a Japanese football player. He plays for Tochigi City, on loan from Matsumoto Yamaga FC.

== Playing career ==
Akira Toshima joined to JEF United Chiba in 2010. In August 2013, he moved to Fujieda MYFC. In 2014, he backed to JEF United Chiba. In 2015, he moved to FC Machida Zelvia.

== Career statistics ==
Updated to 23 February 2018.

Appearances and goals by club, season and competition
Club	Season	League			Emperor's Cup		Total	
Club	Season	Division	Apps	Goals	Apps	Goals	Apps	Goals
JEF United Chiba	2010	J2 League	0	0	0	0	0	0
JEF United Chiba	2011	J2 League	0	0	0	0	0	0
JEF United Chiba	2012	J2 League	0	0	3	1	3	1
JEF United Chiba	2013	J2 League	0	0	0	0	0	0
JEF United Chiba	2014	J2 League	0	0	2	0	2	0
JEF United Chiba	Total		0	0	5	1	5	1
JEF Reserves	2011	JFL	2	0	–		2	0
Fujieda MYFC (loan)	2013	JFL	10	1	1	0	11	1
FC Machida Zelvia (loan)	2015	J3 League	17	3	2	1	19	4
FC Machida Zelvia	2016	J2 League	29	0	1	0	30	0
FC Machida Zelvia	2017	J2 League	33	6	0	0	33	6
FC Machida Zelvia	Total		79	9	3	1	82	10
Career total			91	10	9	2	100	12
