= Yudai Iwama =

Japanese footballer (born 1986)

Yudai Iwama 岩間 雄大
Personal information
- Full name: Yudai Iwama
- Date of birth: 21 February 1986 (age 40)
- Place of birth: Sumida, Tokyo, Japan
- Height: 1.78 m (5 ft 10 in)
- Position: Midfielder

Team information
- Current team: Ococias Kyoto AC
- Number: 5

Youth career
- –2000: Tokyo Verdy
- 2001–2003: Horikoshi High School

Senior career*
Years	Team	Apps	(Gls)
2004–2006	FC Korea	7	(2)
2007–2010	Arte Takasaki	92	(4)
2011–2013	V-Varen Nagasaki	103	(6)
2014–2018	Matsumoto Yamaga	181	(8)
2019–2020	Tochigi SC	43	(1)
2021–2022	Fujieda MYFC	24	(0)
2022	→ ReinMeer Aomori (loan)	14	(0)
2023–	ReinMeer Aomori	0	(0)
- * Club domestic league appearances and goals as of 17 January 2023, 10:50 (UTC)

Yudai Iwama (岩間 雄大, Iwama Yūdai; born 21 February 1986) is a Japanese professional footballer who plays midfielder for ReinMeer Aomori in the Japan Football League.

== Career ==
On 24 March 2013 Iwama started in V-Varen Nagasaki's first match in the J2 League against Matsumoto Yamaga in which he started and played the whole 90 minutes as Nagasaki drew the match 1–1.

On 28 June 2022, Iwama was loaned to JFL club, ReinMeer Aomori during the 2022 season.

In 2023, Iwama announcement officially permanently transfer to ReinMeer Aomori after on loan a season in 2022 has been confirmed from Fujieda MYFC.

== Career statistics ==
=== Club ===
Updated to the start from 2023 season.

Club	Season	League		J. League Cup		Emperor's Cup		AFC		Total	
Club	Season	Apps	Goals	Apps	Goals	Apps	Goals	Apps	Goals	Apps	Goals
Arte Takasaki	2007	24	4	—	—	—	—	—	—	24	4
Arte Takasaki	2008	6	0	—	—	1	0	—	—	7	0
Arte Takasaki	2009	31	0	—	—	2	0	—	—	33	0
Arte Takasaki	2010	31	0	—	—	2	0	—	—	33	0
V-Varen Nagasaki	2011	33	3	—	—	1	1	—	—	34	4
V-Varen Nagasaki	2012	29	3	—	—	1	0	—	—	30	3
V-Varen Nagasaki	2013	41	0	—	—	0	0	—	—	41	0
Matsumoto Yamaga	2014	36	1	—	—	1	0	—	—	37	1
Matsumoto Yamaga	2015	34	0	2	0	4	0	–		40	0
Matsumoto Yamaga	2016	39	1	0	0	1	0	–		40	1
Matsumoto Yamaga	2017	38	2	0	0	–		–		38	2
Matsumoto Yamaga	2018	34	1	0	0	–		–		34	1
Tochigi SC	2019	11	0	—	—	0	0	—	—	11	0
Tochigi SC	2020	32	1	—	—	0	0	—	—	32	2
Fujieda MYFC	2021	23	0	—	—	0	0	—	—	23	0
Fujieda MYFC	2022	1	0	—	—	0	0	—	—	1	0
ReinMeer Aomori	2022	14	0	—	—	0	0	—	—	14	0
ReinMeer Aomori	2023	0	0	—	—	0	0	—	—	0	0
Career total		457	19	2	0	13	1	0	0	472	20
