= Shohei Kiyohara =

Japanese footballer

Shohei Kiyohara 清原 翔平
Personal information
- Full name: Shohei Kiyohara
- Date of birth: June 25, 1987 (age 39)
- Place of birth: Obihiro, Hokkaido, Japan
- Height: 1.65 m (5 ft 5 in)
- Position: Midfielder

Team information
- Current team: SC Sagamihara
- Number: 7

Youth career
- 2003–2005: Obihiro Kita High School
- 2006–2009: Sapporo University

Senior career*
Years	Team	Apps	(Gls)
2010–2012	Sagawa Shiga FC	90	(42)
2013–2015	Zweigen Kanazawa	105	(35)
2016–2017	Cerezo Osaka	28	(3)
2016	→ Cerezo Osaka U-23 (loan)	6	(1)
2017	→ Tokushima Vortis (loan)	9	(0)
2018–2019	Zweigen Kanazawa	69	(7)
2020–	SC Sagamihara	10	(0)
Medal record
Cerezo Osaka
Winner	J.League Cup	2017
Winner	Emperor's Cup	2017
- * Club domestic league appearances and goals as of 23:50, 16 August 2020 (UTC)

Shohei Kiyohara (清原 翔平, born June 25, 1987) is a Japanese football player SC Sagamihara.

== Club statistics ==
Updated to end of 2018 season.

Club performance			League		Cup		League Cup		Other		Total	
Season	Club	League	Apps	Goals	Apps	Goals	Apps	Goals	Apps	Goals	Apps	Goals
Japan			League		Emperor's Cup		J. League Cup		Other^{1}		Total	
2010	Sagawa Shiga FC	JFL	7	0	0	0	–		–		7	0
2011	Sagawa Shiga FC	JFL	22	12	2	0	–		–		24	12
2012	Sagawa Shiga FC	JFL	30	17	3	3	–		–		33	20
2013	Zweigen Kanazawa	JFL	31	13	3	3	–		–		34	16
2014	Zweigen Kanazawa	J3 League	32	9	2	2	–		–		34	11
2015	Zweigen Kanazawa	J2 League	42	13	1	0	–		–		43	13
2016	Cerezo Osaka	J2 League	25	3	1	0	–		2	1	28	4
2016	Cerezo Osaka U-23	J3 League	6	1	–		–		–		6	1
2017	Cerezo Osaka	J1 League	3	0	0	0	7	0	–		10	0
2017	Tokushima Vortis	J2 League	9	0	–		–		–		9	0
2018	Zweigen Kanazawa	J2 League	41	5	2	0	–		–		43	5
Total			248	73	14	8	7	0	2	1	271	82
