= Daisuke Kanzaki =

Japanese footballer

Personal information
- Date of birth: February 2, 1985 (age 41)
- Place of birth: Ōita, Ōita, Japan
- Height: 1.79 m (5 ft 10 in)
- Position: Midfielder

Youth career
- 2003–2006: Fukuoka University of Education

Senior career*
| Years | Team | Apps | (Gls) |
| 2007–2008 | Ventforet Kofu | 7 | (1) |
| 2009–2016 | V-Varen Nagasaki | 168 | (21) |
| 2017 | Giravanz Kitakyushu | 19 | (0) |
- * Club domestic league appearances and goals as of 2 February 2018

Daisuke Kanzaki (神崎 大輔, Kanzaki Daisuke; born February 2, 1985 in Ōita, Ōita) is a former Japanese football player who last featured for Giravanz Kitakyushu.

== Career statistics ==
Updated to 2 February 2018.

Appearances and goals by club, season and competition
| Club | Season | League | | | Emperor's Cup | | J.League Cup | | Total | |
| Club | Season | Division | Apps | Goals | Apps | Goals | Apps | Goals | Apps | Goals |
|---|---|---|---|---|---|---|---|---|---|---|
| Ventforet Kofu | 2007 | J1 League | 0 | 0 | 0 | 0 | 0 | 0 | 0 | 0 |
| Ventforet Kofu | 2008 | J2 League | 7 | 1 | 0 | 0 | — | | 7 | 1 |
| V-Varen Nagasaki | 2009 | JFL | 28 | 2 | 2 | 0 | — | | 30 | 2 |
| V-Varen Nagasaki | 2010 | JFL | 22 | 4 | 1 | 1 | — | | 23 | 5 |
| V-Varen Nagasaki | 2011 | JFL | 22 | 6 | 1 | 0 | — | | 23 | 6 |
| V-Varen Nagasaki | 2012 | JFL | 29 | 7 | 0 | 0 | — | | 29 | 7 |
| V-Varen Nagasaki | 2013 | J2 League | 16 | 1 | 0 | 0 | — | | 16 | 1 |
| V-Varen Nagasaki | 2014 | J2 League | 29 | 0 | 2 | 0 | — | | 31 | 0 |
| V-Varen Nagasaki | 2015 | J2 League | 14 | 1 | 2 | 0 | — | | 16 | 1 |
| V-Varen Nagasaki | 2016 | J2 League | 8 | 0 | 0 | 0 | — | | 8 | 0 |
| Giravanz Kitakyushu | 2017 | J3 League | 19 | 0 | 2 | 0 | — | | 21 | 0 |
| Career total | | | 194 | 22 | 10 | 1 | 0 | 0 | 204 | 23 |
