= Kanakubo =

Kanakubo (written: 金久保) is a Japanese surname. Notable people with the surname include:

- Jun Kanakubo (金久保 順, born 1987), Japanese footballer
- Sai Kanakubo (金久保 彩, born 1989), Japanese footballer

== Fictional characters ==
- Homare Kanakubo (金久保 誉), a character in the visual novel Starry Sky
