= JEF Reserves =

Japanese football club

JEF Reserves ジェフ・リザーブズ
- Full name: JEF United Ichihara Chiba Reserves
- Founded: 1995 (as Ichihara Sports Club)
- Dissolved: 2011
- Ground: Ichihara Seaside Stadium; Ichihara, Chiba, Japan
- Capacity: 15,338
- League: Japan Football League
- Final season 2011: 17th
| Home colours | Away colours |

JEF United Ichihara Chiba Reserves was a Japanese football club. It was the reserve team of J. League club JEF United Ichihara Chiba. Founded in 1995, the club played in the Japan Football League from 2006 until its closure in 2011. JEF Reserves was dissolved on 11 December 2011, owing to financial problems. They played their home games at Ichihara Seaside Stadium.

== Club name transition ==
- Ichihara Sports Club (1995–2002)
- JEF United Ichihara Amateur Team (2003–2004)
- JEF United Ichihara Chiba Amateur Team (2005)
- JEF United Ichihara Chiba Club (2006)
- JEF United Ichihara Chiba Reserves (2007–2011)

== Results in JFL ==
| Season | Pos | Pts | Pld | W | D | L | GF | GA | GD | Emperor's Cup |
|---|---|---|---|---|---|---|---|---|---|---|
| 2006 | 12 | 35 | 34 | 11 | 2 | 21 | 52 | 68 | −16 | 1st round |
| 2007 | 9 | 52 | 34 | 14 | 10 | 10 | 50 | 45 | +5 | Did not qualify |
| 2008 | 15 | 30 | 34 | 8 | 6 | 20 | 31 | 53 | −22 | 2nd round |
| 2009 | 12 | 41 | 34 | 9 | 14 | 11 | 26 | 37 | −11 | 2nd round |
| 2010 | 16 | 30 | 34 | 7 | 9 | 18 | 31 | 55 | −24 | Did not qualify |
| 2011 | 17 | 19 | 33 | 4 | 5 | 22 | 27 | 63 | −36 | Did not qualify |

== Players ==
The squad given here is made up of the players registered to the club on the date of club's final league match (JEF Reserves 3–3 V-Varen Nagasaki, 11 December 2011).
Note: Flags indicate national team as defined under FIFA eligibility rules; some limited exceptions apply. Players may hold more than one non-FIFA nationality.

| No. | Pos. | Nation | Player |
|---|---|---|---|
| 31 | MF | (Costa Rica) CRC | Ariel Rodriguez |
| 2 | FW | (Spain) ESP | Raúl González Robles |
| 3 | DF | (Brazil) BRA | Rodrigo Alves Soares |
| 4 | DF | (Malaysia) MAS | Khair Jones |
| 6 | MF | (Uruguay) URU | Gonzalo Ramos |
| 7 | DF | (Mali) MLI | Cédric Kanté |
| 8 | MF | (Japan) JPN | Thienry Hatanake |
| 9 | DF | (Japan) JPN | Masashi Watanabe |
| 10 | FW | (Japan) JPN | Akira Toshima |
| 11 | FW | (Mexico) MEX | Francisco Rotllán |
| 13 | FW | (Japan) JPN | Shota Tanaka |
| 14 | MF | (North Korea) PRK | Ryu Myon-Gi |
| 15 | MF | (Japan) JPN | Naota Yamaguchi |

| No. | Pos. | Nation | Player |
|---|---|---|---|
| 1 | FW | (Japan) JPN | Yuki Takeuchi |
| 16 | FW | (Japan) JPN | Yuki Takeuchi |
| 17 | GK | (Japan) JPN | Yuki Hayakawa |
| 18 | FW | (Japan) JPN | Ryan Hirooka |
| 19 | MF | (Japan) JPN | Takeru Fukuda |
| 20 | MF | (Japan) JPN | Motoki Inaba |
| 21 | GK | (Japan) JPN | Shota Wakatsuki |
| 22 | MF | (Japan) JPN | Hiroshi Sato |
| 23 | MF | (Japan) JPN | Manabu Watanabe |
| 24 | MF | (Japan) JPN | Sho Ueda |
| 25 | FW | (Japan) JPN | Nobuhide Akiba |
| 26 | DF | (Japan) JPN | Takafumi Hoshino |
| 28 | MF | (Japan) JPN | Yuki Stalph |
| 29 | DF | (Japan) JPN | Kazuki Morimoto |
| 32 | MF | (France) FRA | Andrea Bre de |
