= Arte Takasaki =

Arte Takasaki アルテ高崎
- Full name: Arte Takasaki
- Founded: 1996; 29 years ago
- Dissolved: 2011; 14 years ago
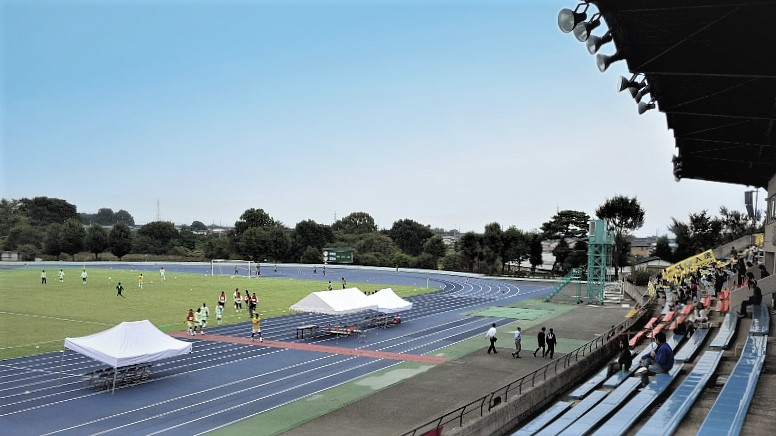
- Ground: Takasaki Hamakawa Athletic Stadium; Takasaki, Gunma
- Capacity: 2,320
- 2011: Japan Football League, 16th of 18
Home colours	Away colours

Arte Takasaki (アルテ高崎, Arute Takasaki) is a defunct Japanese football club that were based in Takasaki, Gunma Prefecture, formerly of the Japan Football League between the seasons 2007 and 2011. Their team colours were red and black.

Arte means art in Italian, Portuguese and Spanish.

== History ==
The club was founded as Makkī F.C. Kantō in 1996. Educational Corporation Horikoshi Gakuen took over the club in 2000. The reorganised club was briefly called Gunma F.C. Fortona but rebranded as Gunma F.C. Horikoshi due to a trademark issue.

The club won all the games in the 2000 Gunma Prefecture League Division 2. They won the 2001 Division 1 championship again without dropping any point. They won the Kanto Regional League Division 1 in 2003 and gained a JFL status in 2004 after winning the play-off.

In 2005, they dropped "Gunma" from their name. It is widely believed that this was a move to appeal more to people in Takasaki area rather than whole Gunma after Thespa Kusatsu became the first J. League side in the prefecture.

In January 2006, they adopted new name Arte Takasaki.

The 2007 season has taken a new tumble for them, already guaranteed a last place finish, and will need to rely on at least one team's promotion to J2 to avoid relegation. Losing to FC Gifu on the last day of the season 2–0, they were theoretically guaranteed a reprieve that was made official once Gifu and Roasso Kumamoto were approved for promotion to J2.

In 2008, they fared not much better, finishing with only Mitsubishi Mizushima below them, and again they were reprieved when Tochigi S.C., Kataller Toyama and Fagiano Okayama were promoted.

Following a fairly safe 2009, the team again stood at the tip of relegation after finishing 17th in 2010 but retained their place in the division by defeating company team Sanyo Sumoto S.C., the- 3rd place team from the Regional Promotion Series tournament, in a promotion/relegation series.

After facing numerous financial issues, the club was excluded from the Japan Football League in January 2012, following Arte Takasaki's final season in 2011, when the club was dissolved.

== Stadium ==
They mainly played their home games at Takasaki Hamakawa Athletic Stadium but also used Shikishima Athletic Stadium and Shikishima Soccer and Rugby Stadium in Maebashi. The club attempted to convince local governments to construct a soccer-specific stadium on the former Takasaki Horserace Track site. However, the future use of the site remains uncertain due to the involvement of various parties, including the prefecture, the city, and private entities, making it a complex issue to resolve.

== Former players ==
- (Japan) Takashi Watari

== Results in JFL ==
As of the end 2011 season.

Season	Pos	Pld	W	D	L	GF	GA	GD	Pts	Emperor's Cup	Coach
2004	8th	30	11	8	11	48	47	1	41	5th round	Ikeda
2005	8th	30	15	3	12	53	40	13	48	3rd round	Miwa, Omi
Arte Takasaki
2006	10th	34	10	7	17	36	62	−26	37	2nd round	Kim Kwang-ho, Hamaguchi, Amaral
2007	18th	34	1	4	29	17	71	−54	7	Did not qualify	Pipo, Watanabe
2008	17th	34	5	5	24	40	107	−67	20	1st round	Watanabe, Kotani
2009	14th	34	9	13	12	34	46	−12	40	2nd round	Goto
2010	17th	34	7	8	19	28	51	−23	29	2nd round	Goto
2011	16th	33	9	7	17	39	55	−16	34	2nd round	Goto

== Honours ==
Arte Takasaki honours
Honour	No.	Years
Gunma Prefectural Football Association (President's Cup Soccer Tournament) Emperor's Cup Gunma Prefectural Qualifiers	10	2000, 2001, 2002, 2004, 2005, 2006, 2008, 2009, 2010, 2011
Gunma Prefectural Adult Soccer League Division 1	1	2001
Kanto Soccer League Division 1	1	2003
Kanto Adult Soccer Tournament	1	2003

== Retired number ==
To commemorate Kosuke Kato who died of a heart attack during a practice session in February 2005, his number 30 is retired.
