= Shunta Takahashi =

Japanese footballer (born 1989)

Shunta Takahashi 高橋 駿太
Personal information
- Full name: Shunta Takahashi
- Date of birth: 9 February 1989 (age 37)
- Place of birth: Imizu, Toyama, Japan
- Height: 1.73 m (5 ft 8 in)
- Position: Forward

Team information
- Current team: Kataller Toyama
- Number: 8

Youth career
- 2004–2007: Toyama Daiichi High School

Senior career*
Years	Team	Apps	(Gls)
2007–2008	Montedio Yamagata	0	(0)
2009–2010	Tochigi Uva FC	47	(20)
2011–2013	FC Ryukyu	95	(47)
2014–2015	Nagano Parceiro	45	(6)
2016–2018	Thespakusatsu Gunma	108	(19)
2019-	Kataller Toyama	119	(19)
- * Club domestic league appearances and goals as of 11 January 2024 @ 17:22(AEST)

Shunta Takahashi (高橋 駿太, Takahashi Shunta; born 9 February 1989) is a Japanese footballer who plays for Kataller Toyama.

== Career statistics ==
Updated to 23 February 2018.

Appearances and goals by club, season and competition
Club	Season	League			Emperor's Cup		Total	
Club	Season	Division	Apps	Goals	Apps	Goals	Apps	Goals
Montedio Yamagata	2007	J2 League	0	0	0	0	0	0
Montedio Yamagata	2008	J2 League	0	0	0	0	0	0
Tochigi Uva FC	2009	JRL	14	7	–		14	7
Tochigi Uva FC	2010	JFL	33	13	1	0	34	13
FC Ryukyu	2011	JFL	33	14	1	0	34	14
FC Ryukyu	2012	JFL	28	20	1	0	29	20
FC Ryukyu	2013	JFL	34	13	2	0	36	13
Nagano Parceiro	2014	J3 League	22	3	2	0	24	3
Nagano Parceiro	2015	J3 League	23	3	2	0	25	3
Thespakusatsu Gunma	2016	J2 League	42	11	1	0	43	11
Thespakusatsu Gunma	2017	J2 League	36	1	1	0	37	1
Career total			265	85	11	0	282	85
