= Yusuke Maeda =

Japanese footballer

Yusuke Maeda 前田悠佑
Personal information
- Full name: Yusuke Maeda
- Date of birth: 23 November 1984 (age 41)
- Place of birth: Sawara-ku, Fukuoka, Japan
- Height: 1.76 m (5 ft 9 in)
- Position: Midfielder

Youth career
- 2003–2006: Seinan Gakuin University

Senior career*
Years	Team	Apps	(Gls)
2007–2011	Honda Lock	129	(42)
2012–2018	V-Varen Nagasaki	170	(2)
- * Club domestic league appearances and goals as of 23 December 2018

Yusuke Maeda (前田 悠佑, born 23 November 1984) is a retired Japanese footballer who played as a midfielder for V-Varen Nagasaki.

== Career ==
After a long career spent with V-Varen Nagasaki, Maeda opted to retire after his side got relegated from J1 in their maiden season in the top tier.

== Career statistics ==
Updated to 23 December 2018.

Club performance			League		Cup		League Cup		Total	
Season	Club	League	Apps	Goals	Apps	Goals	Apps	Goals	Apps	Goals
Japan			League		Emperor's Cup		J. League Cup		Total	
2007	Honda Lock	JRL (Kyushu)	18	12	2	0	–		20	12
2008	Honda Lock	JRL (Kyushu)	17	11	1	1	–		18	12
2009	Honda Lock	JFL	33	6	3	1	–		36	7
2010	Honda Lock	JFL	32	6	2	2	–		34	8
2011	Honda Lock	JFL	29	7	1	1	–		30	8
2012	V-Varen Nagasaki	JFL	13	0	2	1	–		15	1
2013	V-Varen Nagasaki	J2 League	22	0	1	0	–		23	0
2014	V-Varen Nagasaki	J2 League	21	0	3	0	–		24	0
2015	V-Varen Nagasaki	J2 League	35	1	1	0	–		36	1
2016	V-Varen Nagasaki	J2 League	34	0	0	0	–		34	0
2017	V-Varen Nagasaki	J2 League	32	1	0	0	–		32	1
2018	V-Varen Nagasaki	J1 League	13	0	2	0	3	0	18	0
Total			299	44	18	6	3	0	320	50
