= Kazuya Okamura =

Japanese footballer

Kazuya Okamura 岡村 和哉
Personal information
- Full name: Kazuya Okamura
- Date of birth: 15 December 1987 (age 38)
- Place of birth: Ibara, Okayama, Japan
- Height: 1.80 m (5 ft 11 in)
- Position: Forward

Team information
- Current team: FC Gifu
- Number: 6

Youth career
- 2006–2009: Osaka Gakuin University

Senior career*
Years	Team	Apps	(Gls)
2010–2011	Roasso Kumamoto	0	(0)
2011–2014	V-Varen Nagasaki	32	(4)
2013	→ Kamatamare Sanuki (loan)	14	(1)
2014–2018	Kamatamare Sanuki	169	(4)
2019–2021	Giravanz Kitakyushu	82	(3)
2022	FC Gifu	18	(0)
- * Club domestic league appearances and goals as of 1 January 2023

Kazuya Okamura (岡村 和哉, Okamura Kazuya; born 15 December 1987) is a Japanese professional footballer who plays forward for FC Gifu in the J3 League.

== Career statistics ==
Updated to 23 February 2018.

Club	Season	League		Emperor's Cup		Other^{1}		Total	
Club	Season	Apps	Goals	Apps	Goals	Apps	Goals	Apps	Goals
Roasso Kumamoto	2010	0	0	1	0	–		0	0
Roasso Kumamoto	2011	0	0	0	0	–		0	0
V-Varen Nagasaki	2011	7	1	1	1	–		8	2
V-Varen Nagasaki	2012	23	3	1	0	–		24	3
V-Varen Nagasaki	2013	2	0	0	0	–		2	0
Kamatamare Sanuki	2013	14	1	1	0	2	0	17	1
Kamatamare Sanuki	2014	39	3	1	0	2	0	42	3
Kamatamare Sanuki	2015	39	0	1	0	–		40	0
Kamatamare Sanuki	2016	24	0	0	0	–		0	0
Kamatamare Sanuki	2017	27	0	1	0	–		28	0
Career total		175	8	7	0	4	0	186	8

^{1}Includes J2/J3 relegation play-offs.
