= Junya Yamashiro =

Japanese footballer

Junya Yamashiro 山城 純也
Personal information
- Full name: Junya Yamashiro
- Date of birth: June 19, 1985 (age 41)
- Place of birth: Yawata, Japan
- Height: 1.58 m (5 ft 2 in)
- Position: Midfielder

Team information
- Current team: Fukui United FC
- Number: 7

Youth career
- 2001–2003: Cerezo Osaka

Senior career*
Years	Team	Apps	(Gls)
2004–2005	Cerezo Osaka	1	(0)
2006–2008	Sagan Tosu	97	(4)
2009–2012	V-Varen Nagasaki	98	(3)
2013	Zweigen Kanazawa	22	(2)
2013–2016	Japan Soccer College	40	(5)
2017–	Fukui United FC	21	(2)
Total		279	(16)
- * Club domestic league appearances and goals as of 1 January 2019

Junya Yamashiro (山城 純也, Yamashiro Junya; born June 19, 1985) is a Japanese football player.

== Career statistics ==
Appearances and goals by club, season and competition
Club	Season	League			Emperor's Cup		J.League Cup		Total	
Club	Season	Division	Apps	Goals	Apps	Goals	Apps	Goals	Apps	Goals
Cerezo Osaka	2004	J1 League	1	0	0	0	3	0	4	0
Cerezo Osaka	2005	J1 League	0	0	0	0	0	0	0	0
Sagan Tosu	2006	J2 League	47	3	1	0	—		48	3
Sagan Tosu	2007	J2 League	29	1	1	0	—		30	1
Sagan Tosu	2008	J2 League	21	0	0	0	—		21	0
V-Varen Nagasaki	2009	Football League	28	0	1	0	—		29	0
V-Varen Nagasaki	2010	Football League								
Career total			126	4	3	0	3	0	132	4
