= Takashi Watari =

Japanese footballer (born 1972)

Takashi Watari (Japanese: 亘崇詞; born 8 March 1972) is a Japanese former footballer who played as a midfielder. He played for Peruvian side Sporting Cristal. After retiring from professional football, he worked as a manager. He has also worked as a translator, and obtained a JFA S Class Coaching License.

Watari was born in Okayama but moved to Argentina at a young age.
