= Yoshinobu Harada =

Japanese footballer (born 1986)

Personal information
- Date of birth: 17 May 1986 (age 40)
- Place of birth: Saitama, Japan
- Height: 1.83 m (6 ft 0 in)
- Position: Goalkeeper

Team information
- Current team: Tochigi City FC
- Number: 1

Youth career
- 2002–2004: Seiritsu Gakuen High School

Senior career*
Years	Team	Apps	(Gls)
2005–2010	Mito HollyHock	6	(0)
2011–2012	Tochigi Uva	33	(0)
2012–2013	V-Varen Nagasaki	31	(0)
2014–2017	Zweigen Kanazawa	75	(0)
2018–	Tochigi Uva / Tochigi City	114	(0)
- * Club domestic league appearances and goals as of 1 January 2026

Yoshinobu Harada (原田 欽庸, Harada Yoshinobu; born 17 May 1986) is a Japanese footballer who plays as a goalkeeper for Tochigi City FC in the J3 League.

== Career statistics ==
As of 23 February 2016

Club performance			League		Cup		Total	
Season	Club	League	Apps	Goals	Apps	Goals	Apps	Goals
Japan			League		Emperor's Cup		Total	
2005	Mito Hollyhock	J2 League	0	0	0	0	0	0
2006	Mito Hollyhock	J2 League	0	0	0	0	0	0
2007	Mito Hollyhock	J2 League	1	0	2	0	3	0
2008	Mito Hollyhock	J2 League	0	0	0	0	0	0
2009	Mito Hollyhock	J2 League	1	0	1	0	2	0
2010	Mito Hollyhock	J2 League	4	0	0	0	4	0
2011	Tochigi Uva	JFL	33	0	2	0	35	0
2012	Tochigi Uva	JFL	0	0	0	0	0	0
2012	V-Varen Nagasaki	JFL	31	0	2	0	33	0
2013	V-Varen Nagasaki	J2 League	0	0	0	0	0	0
2014	Zweigen Kanazawa	J3 League	33	0	1	0	34	0
2015	Zweigen Kanazawa	J2 League	42	0	1	0	43	0
Total			145	0	9	0	154	0
