= Junki Kanayama =

Japanese footballer

Junki Kanayama 金山 隼樹
Personal information
- Full name: Junki Kanayama
- Date of birth: 12 June 1988 (age 38)
- Place of birth: Shimane, Japan
- Height: 1.85 m (6 ft 1 in)
- Position: Goalkeeper

Youth career
- Hirata Junior High School
- 2004–2006: Sanfrecce Hiroshima

College career
Years	Team	Apps	(Gls)
2007–2010	Ritsumeikan University		

Senior career*
Years	Team	Apps	(Gls)
2011–2013	V-Varen Nagasaki	48	(0)
2014–2017	Hokkaido Consadole Sapporo	48	(0)
2018–2025	Fagiano Okayama	66	(0)
Total		162	(0)
- * Club domestic league appearances and goals

Junki Kanayama (金山 隼樹, Kanayama Junki) is a Japanese former footballer who played as a goalkeeper.

== Club statistics ==
Appearances and goals by club, season and competition
Club	Season	League			National cup (Note: Includes Emperors Cup)		League cup (Note: Includes J.League Cup)		Other		Total	
Club	Season	Division	Apps	Goals	Apps	Goals	Apps	Goals	Apps	Goals	Apps	Goals
V-Varen Nagasaki	2011	JFL	8	0	1	0	–		0	0	9	0
V-Varen Nagasaki	2012	JFL	1	0	0	0	–		0	0	1	0
V-Varen Nagasaki	2013	J.League Division 2	39	0	1	0	–		1 (Note: Appearance in J1/J2 play-offs)	0	41	0
V-Varen Nagasaki	Total		48	0	2	0	0	0	1	0	51	0
Hokkaido Consadole Sapporo	2014	J.League Division 2	28	0	1	0	0	0	–		29	0
Hokkaido Consadole Sapporo	2015	J2 League	9	0	1	0	0	0	–		10	0
Hokkaido Consadole Sapporo	2016	J2 League	9	0	0	0	0	0	–		9	0
Hokkaido Consadole Sapporo	2017	J1 League	2	0	1	0	5	0	–		8	0
Hokkaido Consadole Sapporo	Total		48	0	3	0	5	0	0	0	56	0
Fagiano Okayama	2018	J2 League	22	0	0	0	0	0	–		22	0
Fagiano Okayama	2019	J2 League	8	0	2	0	0	0	–		10	0
Fagiano Okayama	2020	J2 League	2	0	0	0	0	0	–		2	0
Fagiano Okayama	2021	J2 League	18	0	1	0	0	0	–		19	0
Fagiano Okayama	2022	J2 League	13	0	1	0	0	0	–		14	0
Fagiano Okayama	2023	J2 League	2	0	1	0	0	0	–		3	0
Fagiano Okayama	2024	J2 League	0	0	0	0	0	0	–		0	0
Fagiano Okayama	2025	J1 League	1	0	0	0	0	0	–		1	0
Fagiano Okayama	Total		66	0	5	0	0	0	0	0	71	0
Career total			162	0	10	0	5	0	1	0	178	0
