= Shinsaku Mochidome =

Japanese footballer

Personal information
- Date of birth: April 29, 1988 (age 38)
- Place of birth: Kadoma, Osaka, Japan
- Height: 1.77 m (5 ft 9 1/2 in)
- Position: Defender

Youth career
- 2004–2006: Gamba Osaka

Senior career*
Years	Team	Apps	(Gls)
2007–2010	Ehime FC	38	(0)
2011–2013	V-Varen Nagasaki	60	(6)
2013–2014	Kamatamare Sanuki	32	(0)
2015	Sagawa Printing	25	(1)
Total		155	(7)
- * Club domestic league appearances and goals

Shinsaku Mochidome (持留 新作, Mochidome Shinsaku; born April 29, 1988) is a former Japanese football player.

== Career statistics ==
Appearances and goals by club, season and competition
Club	Season	League			Emperor's Cup		Total	
Club	Season	Division	Apps	Goals	Apps	Goals	Apps	Goals
Ehime FC	2007	J2 League	8	0	0	0	8	0
Ehime FC	2008	J2 League	1	0	0	0	1	0
Ehime FC	2009	J2 League	7	0	0	0	7	0
Ehime FC	2010	J2 League	22	1	2	0	30	1
Career total			38	0	2	0	40	0
