= Kohei Shimoda =

Japanese footballer

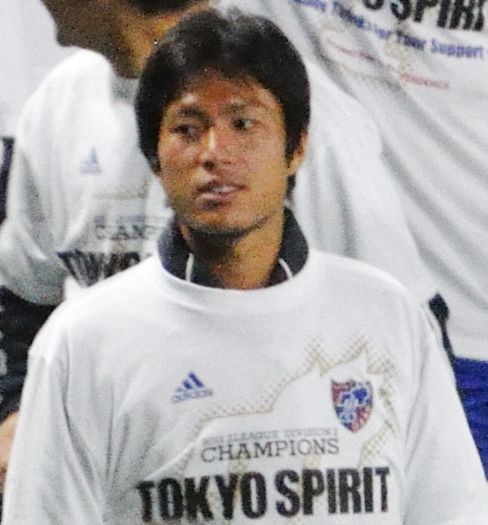

Personal information
- Full name: Kohei Shimoda
- Date of birth: April 8, 1989 (age 37)
- Place of birth: Akita, Japan
- Height: 1.80 m (5 ft 11 in)
- Position: Midfielder

Youth career
- 2005–2007: Akita Commercial High School

Senior career*
Years	Team	Apps	(Gls)
2008–2012	FC Tokyo	3	(0)
2009–2010	→ Mito HollyHock (loan)	31	(0)
2012	Machida Zelvia	16	(1)
2013–2014	V-Varen Nagasaki	28	(1)
2015–2017	Blaublitz Akita	56	(1)
Medal record
FC Tokyo
Winner	J.League Cup	2009
Winner	Emperor's Cup	2011
- * Club domestic league appearances and goals as of 2 February 2018

Kohei Shimoda (下田 光平, Shimoda Kōhei; born April 8, 1989) is a former Japanese football player who last played for Blaublitz Akita.

== Career statistics ==
Updated to 2 February 2018.

Appearances and goals by club, season and competition
Club	Season	League			Emperor's Cup		J.League Cup		Total	
Club	Season	Division	Apps	Goals	Apps	Goals	Apps	Goals	Apps	Goals
FC Tokyo	2008	J1 League	0	0	0	0	0	0	0	0
FC Tokyo	2009	J1 League	0	0	0	0	0	0	0	0
Mito Hollyhock	2009	J2 League	17	0	0	0	—		17	0
Mito Hollyhock	2010	J2 League	14	0	1	0	—		15	0
FC Tokyo	2011	J2 League	3	0	1	0	—		4	0
FC Tokyo	2012	J1 League	0	0	0	0	0	0	0	0
FC Machida Zelvia	2012	J2 League	16	1	1	0	—		17	1
V-Varen Nagasaki	2013	J2 League	13	0	0	0	—		13	0
V-Varen Nagasaki	2014	J2 League	15	1	1	0	—		16	1
Blaublitz Akita	2015	J3 League	34	0	2	0	—		36	0
Blaublitz Akita	2016	J3 League	15	1	2	0	—		17	1
Blaublitz Akita	2017	J3 League	7	0	1	0	—		8	0
Career total			134	3	9	0	0	0	143	3

== Honours ==
FC Tokyo

- J2 League (1): 2011
- Emperor's Cup (1): 2011

Blaublitz Akita

- J3 League (1): 2017
