= Yusei Ogasawara =

Japanese footballer

Personal information
- Full name: Yusei Ogasawara
- Date of birth: April 16, 1988 (age 38)
- Place of birth: Ehime, Japan
- Height: 1.70 m (5 ft 7 in)
- Position: Midfielder

Youth career
- 2004–2006: Ehime FC
- 2007–2010: Kyoto Sangyo University

Senior career*
Years	Team	Apps	(Gls)
2011–2012	Ehime FC	26	(0)
2013–2014	V-Varen Nagasaki	29	(2)
2016	Nakhon Pathom United	28	(10)
2017	Sisaket	10	(0)
2017	PT Prachuap	15	(7)
2018	Kasetsart	14	(3)
2018	Nongbua Pitchaya	0	(0)
- * Club domestic league appearances and goals as of 20 September 2017

Yusei Ogasawara (小笠原 侑生, Ogasawara Yusei; born April 16, 1988) is a Japanese football player.

== Club statistics ==
Club performance			League		Cup		Total	
Season	Club	League	Apps	Goals	Apps	Goals	Apps	Goals
Japan			League		Emperor's Cup		Total	
2011	Ehime FC	J2 League	11	0	2	0	13	0
2012	Ehime FC	J2 League	15	0	0	0	15	0
2013	V-Varen Nagasaki	J2 League	14	1	0	0	14	1
2014	V-Varen Nagasaki	J2 League	0	0	0	0	0	0
Country	Japan		55	2	3	0	58	2
Total			55	2	3	0	58	2
