= Kohei Yamada =

Japanese footballer

Kohei Yamada 山田晃平
Personal information
- Full name: Yamada Kohei
- Date of birth: 8 January 1989 (age 37)
- Place of birth: Itami, Hyōgo, Japan
- Height: 1.71 m (5 ft 7 1/2 in)
- Position: Midfielder

Team information
- Current team: Nara Club
- Number: 33

Youth career
- 2006–2009: Osaka University of Economics

Senior career*
Years	Team	Apps	(Gls)
2010–2011	Thespa Kusatsu	34	(0)
2012	Colorado Rapids	0	(0)
2012–2014	V-Varen Nagasaki	32	(2)
2014	→ AC Nagano Parceiro (loan)	16	(0)
2015–2016	AC Nagano Parceiro	28	(1)
2017	FC Gifu	24	(1)
2018–	Nara Club	30	(0)
- * Club domestic league appearances and goals as of 18 November 2018

Kohei Yamada (山田 晃平, Yamada Kōhei) (born 8 January 1989 in Itami, Hyōgo, Japan) is a Japanese footballer who currently plays for Nara Club.

== Club career ==
Yamada played in the Cerezo Osaka U-15, and won the Japanese national high school championship as the striker of the team with Takashi Inui up front. He left Osaka University of Economics during his sophomore season to begin his career with Thespa Kusatsu in Japan's J. League 2. He made his official debut with the club during the 2010 season and ended his first professional season appearing in 18 league matches.

After two seasons with Thespa Kusatsu, Yamada was scouted at the Japan Pro-Footballers Association (JPFA) Tryout by Major League Soccer, and invited to the Major League Soccer combine in January 2012, with a hope of being selected by one of Major league Soccer's nineteen clubs. He was selected by Colorado Rapids in the third round of the 2012 MLS Supplemental Draft (52nd overall). Yamada had signed with MLS before the draft, so became part of the Rapids squad immediately.

Yamada was waived by Colorado on 20 June 2012.

== Club statistics ==
Updated to 23 February 2018.

Club performance			League		Cup		League Cup		Total	
Season	Club	League	Apps	Goals	Apps	Goals	Apps	Goals	Apps	Goals
Japan			League		Emperor's Cup		League Cup		Total	
2010	Thespa Kusatsu	J2 League	18	0	1	0	–		19	0
2011	Thespa Kusatsu	J2 League	16	0	0	0	–		16	0
Club performance			League		Cup		Continental		Total	
Season	Club	League	Apps	Goals	Apps	Goals	Apps	Goals	Apps	Goals
USA			League		Open Cup		North America		Total	
2012	Colorado Rapids	MLS	0	0	0	0	0	0	0	0
Club performance			League		Cup		League Cup		Total	
Season	Club	League	Apps	Goals	Apps	Goals	Apps	Goals	Apps	Goals
Japan			League		Emperor's Cup		J. League Cup		Total	
2012	V-Varen Nagasaki	JFL	8	1	–		–		8	1
2013	V-Varen Nagasaki	J2 League	25	2	0	0	–		25	2
2014	V-Varen Nagasaki	J2 League	7	0	–		–		7	0
2014	Nagano Parceiro	J3 League	16	0	0	0	–		16	0
2015	Nagano Parceiro	J3 League	23	1	1	0	–		24	1
2016	Nagano Parceiro	J3 League	0	0	1	0	–		1	0
2017	FC Gifu	J2 League	24	1	0	0	–		24	1
2019	Nara Club	JFL	30	0	1	0	–		31	0
2019	Nara Club	JFL					–			
Total	Japan		167	5	4	0	–		171	5
Total	USA		0	0	0	0	0	0	0	0
Career total			167	5	4	0	–		171	5
