= Yudai Inoue =

Japanese footballer

Yudai Inoue 井上裕大
Personal information
- Full name: Yudai Inoue
- Date of birth: May 30, 1989 (age 37)
- Place of birth: Ōita, Japan
- Height: 1.70 m (5 ft 7 in)
- Position: Midfielder

Team information
- Current team: Machida Zelvia
- Number: 15

Youth career
- 2002–2007: Oita Trinita

Senior career*
Years	Team	Apps	(Gls)
2008–2012	Oita Trinita	48	(4)
2013–2015	V-Varen Nagasaki	71	(3)
2016–	Machida Zelvia	119	(5)
Medal record
Oita Trinita
Winner	J.League Cup	2008
- * Club domestic league appearances and goals as of 1 January 2020

Yudai Inoue (井上 裕大, Inoue Yūdai; born May 30, 1989 in Ōita, Ōita) is a Japanese football player currently playing for FC Machida Zelvia in the J2 League.

== Club statistics ==
Updated to 1 January 2020.

Club performance			League		Cup		League Cup		Other		Total	
Season	Club	League	Apps	Goals	Apps	Goals	Apps	Goals	Apps	Goals	Apps	Goals
Japan			League		Emperor's Cup		J. League Cup		Other^{1}		Total	
2008	Oita Trinita	J1 League	0	0	1	0	0	0	-		1	0
2009	Oita Trinita	J1 League	3	0	0	0	3	0	1	0	7	0
2010	Oita Trinita	J2 League	22	3	3	1	-		-		25	4
2011	Oita Trinita	J2 League	22	1	1	0	-		-		23	1
2012	Oita Trinita	J2 League	1	0	0	0	-		-		1	0
2013	V-Varen Nagasaki	J2 League	40	3	1	1	-		1	0	42	4
2014	V-Varen Nagasaki	J2 League	9	0	1	0	-		-		10	0
2015	V-Varen Nagasaki	J2 League	22	0	0	0	-		1	0	23	0
2016	Machida Zelvia	J2 League	18	0	1	0	-		-		19	0
2017	Machida Zelvia	J2 League	40	4	0	0	-		-		40	4
2018	Machida Zelvia	J2 League	32	0	2	0	-		-		34	0
2019	Machida Zelvia	J2 League	29	1	0	0	-		-		29	1
Total			238	12	10	2	3	0	3	0	254	14

^{1}Includes Suruga Bank Championship and Promotion Playoffs to J1.
