= Daisuke Fujii =

Japanese footballer

Personal information
- Date of birth: October 15, 1986 (age 40)
- Place of birth: Ibaraki, Osaka, Japan
- Height: 1.80 m (5 ft 11 in)
- Position: Defender

Youth career
- 2002–2004: Sanfrecce Hiroshima

Senior career*
| Years | Team | Apps | (Gls) |
| 2005–2006 | Albirex Niigata | 11 | (0) |
| 2007–2009 | Thespa Kusatsu | 65 | (2) |
| 2010–2014 | V-Varen Nagasaki | 101 | (4) |
| 2014 | Kamatamare Sanuki | 3 | (0) |
| Total | | 180 | (6) |
- * Club domestic league appearances and goals

Daisuke Fujii (藤井 大輔, Fujii Daisuke; born October 15, 1986) is a former Japanese football player.

== Career statistics ==
Appearances and goals by club, season and competition
| Club | Season | League | | | Emperor's Cup | | J.League Cup | | Total | |
| Club | Season | Division | Apps | Goals | Apps | Goals | Apps | Goals | Apps | Goals |
|---|---|---|---|---|---|---|---|---|---|---|
| Albirex Niigata | 2005 | J1 League | 2 | 0 | 2 | 0 | 0 | 0 | 4 | 0 |
| Albirex Niigata | 2006 | J1 League | 2 | 0 | 0 | 0 | 4 | 0 | 6 | 0 |
| Thespa Kusatsu | 2007 | J2 League | 24 | 0 | 1 | 0 | — | | 25 | 0 |
| Thespa Kusatsu | 2008 | J2 League | 6 | 1 | 0 | 0 | — | | 6 | 1 |
| Thespa Kusatsu | 2009 | J2 League | 34 | 1 | 1 | 0 | — | | 35 | 1 |
| Career total | | | 68 | 2 | 4 | 0 | 4 | 0 | 76 | 2 |
