= Kenta Furube =

Japanese footballer

Kenta Furube 古部健太
Personal information
- Full name: Kenta Furube
- Date of birth: 30 November 1985 (age 40)
- Place of birth: Hyōgo, Japan
- Height: 1.80 m (5 ft 11 in)
- Position: Midfielder

Team information
- Current team: Velos Kronos Tsuno

Youth career
- 2004–2007: Ritsumeikan University

Senior career*
Years	Team	Apps	(Gls)
2008–2009	Yokohama F. Marinos	0	(0)
2009–2011	Zweigen Kanazawa	77	(23)
2012–2015	V-Varen Nagasaki	141	(10)
2016	Avispa Fukuoka	4	(0)
2017	V-Varen Nagasaki	10	(0)
2018–2019	Montedio Yamagata	11	(0)
2020–	Velos Kronos Tsuno		
- * Club domestic league appearances and goals as of 11:16, 7 February 2021 (UTC)

Kenta Furube (古部 健太, Furube Kenta; born 30 November 1985) is a Japanese professional footballer who plays as a midfielder for Velos Kronos Tsuno.

== Career ==
=== V-Varen Nagasaki ===
Furube played his first game in the J. League Division 2 for V-Varen Nagasaki on 24 March 2013 against Matsumoto Yamaga in which he started and played the full 90 minutes as Nagasaki drew the match 1–1. He then scored his first goal of the season for the club on 17 April 2013 in which he scored in the 83rd minute against Yokohama FC as he led Nagasaki to a 2–1 victory.

== Career statistics ==
Updated to end of 2018 season.

Club	Season	League		J. League Cup		Emperor's Cup		Other^{1}		Total	
Club	Season	Apps	Goals	Apps	Goals	Apps	Goals	Apps	Goals	Apps	Goals
Yokohama F. Marinos	2008	0	0	0	0	0	0	–		0	0
Yokohama F. Marinos	2009	0	0	0	0	0	0	–		0	0
Zweigen Kanazawa	2009	12	8	–		2	1	–		14	9
Zweigen Kanazawa	2010	32	8	–		2	1	–		34	9
Zweigen Kanazawa	2011	33	7	–		2	0	–		35	7
V-Varen Nagasaki	2012	24	2	–		2	0	–		26	2
V-Varen Nagasaki	2013	37	1	–		1	1	1	0	39	2
V-Varen Nagasaki	2014	39	4	–		3	1	–		42	5
V-Varen Nagasaki	2015	41	3	–		1	0	1	0	43	3
Avispa Fukuoka	2016	4	0	3	0	1	0	–		8	0
V-Varen Nagasaki	2017	10	0	–		1	0	–		11	0
Montedio Yamagata	2018	8	0	–		3	0	–		11	0
Career total		240	33	3	0	18	4	2	0	263	37

^{1}Includes Promotion Playoffs to J1.
