= Kazuya Kawabata =

Japanese footballer

Kazuya Kawabata 河端 和哉
Personal information
- Full name: Kazuya Kawabata
- Date of birth: October 22, 1981 (age 45)
- Place of birth: Tomakomai, Hokkaido, Japan
- Height: 1.74 m (5 ft 8 1/2 in)
- Position: Defender

Youth career
- 1997–1999: Aomori Yamada High School
- 2000–2003: Sapporo University

Senior career*
Years	Team	Apps	(Gls)
2003–2004	Consadole Sapporo	2	(0)
2005–2009	Roasso Kumamoto	72	(3)
2010–2011	Giravanz Kitakyushu	21	(0)
2012–2013	V-Varen Nagasaki	28	(0)
2013–2014	FC Ryukyu	32	(1)
2015–2017	ReinMeer Aomori	68	(0)
Total		223	(4)
- * Club domestic league appearances and goals

Kazuya Kawabata (河端 和哉, Kawabata Kazuya; born October 22, 1981) is a former Japanese football player.

== Club statistics ==
Club performance			League		Cup		Total	
Season	Club	League	Apps	Goals	Apps	Goals	Apps	Goals
Japan			League		Emperor's Cup		Total	
2003	Consadole Sapporo	J2 League	1	0	0	0	1	0
2004	Consadole Sapporo	J2 League	1	0	0	0	1	0
2005	Rosso Kumamoto	JRL (Kyushu)	11	2	1	0	12	2
2006	Rosso Kumamoto	JFL	3	0	0	0	3	0
2007	Rosso Kumamoto	JFL	2	0	0	0	2	0
2008	Roasso Kumamoto	J2 League	33	1	1	0	34	1
2009	Roasso Kumamoto	J2 League	23	0	0	0	23	0
2010	Giravanz Kitakyushu	J2 League	21	0	2	0	23	0
2011	Giravanz Kitakyushu	J2 League	0	0	0	0	0	0
2012	V-Varen Nagasaki	JFL	28	0	1	0	29	0
2013	V-Varen Nagasaki	J2 League	0	0	–		0	0
2013	FC Ryukyu	JFL	12	0	2	0	14	0
2014	FC Ryukyu	J3 League	20	1	1	0	21	1
2015	ReinMeer Aomori	JRL (Tohoku, Div. 1)	13	0	1	0	14	0
2016	ReinMeer Aomori	JFL	28	0	–		28	0
2017	ReinMeer Aomori	JFL	27	0	–		27	0
Total			196	4	9	0	205	4
