= Shoma Mizunaga =

Japanese footballer

Shoma Mizunaga 水永 翔馬
Personal information
- Full name: Shoma Mizunaga
- Date of birth: 22 May 1985 (age 41)
- Place of birth: Kadogawa, Miyazaki, Japan
- Height: 1.80 m (5 ft 11 in)
- Position: Striker

Youth career
- 2001–2003: Miyazaki Nihon University; Junior and Senior High School

Senior career*
Years	Team	Apps	(Gls)
2004–2010	Honda Lock SC	131	(47)
2011–2014	V-Varen Nagasaki	91	(31)
2014	→ Zweigen Kanazawa (loan)	16	(8)
2015–2017	Zweigen Kanazawa	61	(8)
2017	→ Giravanz Kitakyushu (loan)	27	(5)
2018–2022	Tegevajaro Miyazaki	78	(26)
Total		404	(125)
- * Club domestic league appearances and goals as of 8 March 2020

Shoma Mizunaga (水永 翔馬, Mizunaga Shōma; born 22 May 1985) is a former Japanese footballer who last played as a striker for Tegevajaro Miyazaki.

== Career ==
After spending close to six years with Honda Lock S.C. in the Japan Football League Mizunaga signed for fellow Japan Football League side V-Varen Nagasaki for the 2011 season.

Mizunaga began the 2013 in the J. League Division 2 with V-Varen Nagasaki after the club gained promotion to the league. Mizunaga made his full-professional debut in the 2nd Division on 3 March 2013 against Fagiano Okayama in which he came on as a 75th-minute substitute for Kōichi Satō as V–Varen drew the match 1–1. Mizunaga then scored his first ever goal in the J. League Division 2 the very next game against former Japanese champions Gamba Osaka in which was also V–Varen's first home game in the 2nd Division in front of over 18,000 fans in attendance in which he scored in the 79th minute for the club which turned out to be a consolation as V–Varen Nagasaki lost the match 3–1. He then scored his second goal of the season on 24 March 2013 against Matsumoto Yamaga before scoring his third goal the very next game on 31 March 2013 against Gainare Tottori in which V–Varen Nagasaki won 3–1.

After a long journey through different clubs in J. League, Mizunaga came back home and joined newly promoted JFL-team Tegevajaro Miyazaki in December 2017. In 2022, having lastly played for them, he announced his retirement.

== Club statistics ==
Updated to 8 March 2020.

Club performance			League		Cup		Total	
Season	Club	League	Apps	Goals	Apps	Goals	Apps	Goals
Japan			League		Emperor's Cup		Total	
2004	Honda Lock SC	JRL (Kyushu)	0	0	3	1	3	1
2005	Honda Lock SC	JFL	29	11	4	0	33	11
2006	Honda Lock SC	JFL	24	10	-		24	10
2007	Honda Lock SC	JRL (Kyushu)	17	7	2	1	19	8
2008	Honda Lock SC	JRL (Kyushu)	16	8	0	0	16	8
2009	Honda Lock SC	JFL	32	10	3	0	35	10
2010	Honda Lock SC	JFL	13	1	0	0	13	1
2011	V-Varen Nagasaki	JFL	28	14	2	0	30	14
2012	V-Varen Nagasaki	JFL	28	12	2	1	30	13
2013	V-Varen Nagasaki	J2 League	32	5	1	0	33	5
2014	V-Varen Nagasaki	J2 League	3	0	-		3	0
2014	Zweigen Kanazawa	J3 League	16	8	0	0	16	8
2015	Zweigen Kanazawa	J2 League	28	5	1	0	29	5
2016	Zweigen Kanazawa	J2 League	33	3	0	0	33	3
2017	Giravanz Kitakyushu	J3 League	27	5	1	2	28	7
2018	Tegevajaro Miyazaki	JFL	27	12	1	0	28	12
2019	Tegevajaro Miyazaki	JFL	24	7	-		24	7
2020	Tegevajaro Miyazaki	JFL	12	6	0	0	12	6
2021	Tegevajaro Miyazaki	J3 League	15	1	-		15	1
Total			377	118	20	5	397	123
