= Takahiro Yamaguchi =

Japanese footballer (born 1984)

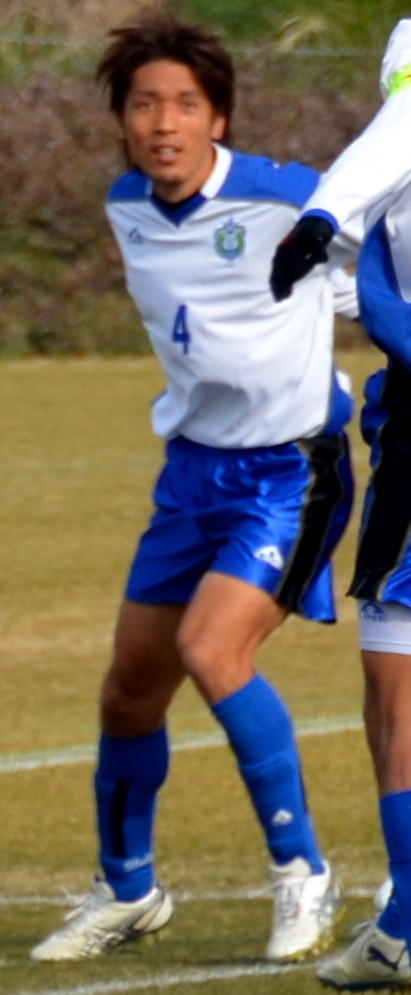

Personal information
- Full name: Takahiro Yamaguchi
- Date of birth: May 8, 1984 (age 42)
- Place of birth: Nakano, Tokyo, Japan
- Height: 1.80 m (5 ft 11 in)
- Position: Defender

Youth career
- 2003–2006: Waseda University

Senior career*
Years	Team	Apps	(Gls)
2007–2012	Shonan Bellmare	135	(2)
2013–2014	V-Varen Nagasaki	78	(4)
2015–2017	Oita Trinita	44	(2)
- * Club domestic league appearances and goals as of 2 February 2018

Takahiro Yamaguchi (山口 貴弘, Yamaguchi Takahiro; born May 8, 1984 in Tokyo) is a former Japanese footballer who last played for Oita Trinita.

== Career statistics ==
Updated to 2 February 2018.

Club performance			League		Cup		League Cup		Other		Total	
Season	Club	League	Apps	Goals	Apps	Goals	Apps	Goals	Apps	Goals	Apps	Goals
Japan			League		Emperor's Cup		J. League Cup		Other^{1}		Total	
2007	Shonan Bellmare	J2 League	27	1	2	0	-		-		29	1
2008	Shonan Bellmare	J2 League	29	0	0	0	-		-		29	0
2009	Shonan Bellmare	J2 League	30	0	0	0	-		-		30	0
2010	Shonan Bellmare	J1 League	20	1	0	0	4	0	-		24	1
2011	Shonan Bellmare	J2 League	19	0	0	0	-		-		19	0
2012	Shonan Bellmare	J2 League	10	0	0	0	-		-		10	0
2013	V-Varen Nagasaki	J2 League	41	3	1	0	-		1	0	43	3
2014	V-Varen Nagasaki	J2 League	37	1	3	0	-		-		40	1
2015	Oita Trinita	J2 League	28	2	2	0	-		1	0	31	2
2016	Oita Trinita	J3 League	14	0	1	0	–		–		15	0
2017	Oita Trinita	J2 League	2	0	2	0	–		–		4	0
Career total			257	8	11	0	4	0	2	0	274	8

^{1}Includes J1 Promotion Playoffs and J2/J3 Promotion-Relegation Playoffs.
