= Oh Chang-hyun =

South Korean footballer

Personal information
- Date of birth: May 4, 1989 (age 37)
- Place of birth: South Korea
- Height: 1.82 m (5 ft 11 1/2 in)
- Position: Defender

Team information
- Current team: Daejeon Citizen
- Number: 22

Youth career
- 2005–2007: Kwacheon High School
- 2008–2011: Kwangwoon University

Senior career*
Years	Team	Apps	(Gls)
2012–2014	Avispa Fukuoka	21	(0)
2013	→ V-Varen Nagasaki (loan)	2	(0)
2015	Seoul E-Land	3	(0)
2016–	Daejeon Citizen	27	(0)

International career
2008–2009	South Korea U20		
- * Club domestic league appearances and goals as of 28 November 2016

- Oh Chang-hyun
- Hangul: 오창현
- Hanja: 吳昌炫
- RR: O Changhyeon
- MR: O Ch'anghyŏn

Oh Chang-hyun (born May 4, 1989) is a South Korean football player who plays for Daejeon Citizen in the K League Challenge.
