= Sai Kanakubo =

Japanese footballer

Personal information
- Date of birth: January 11, 1989 (age 37)
- Place of birth: Sakai, Ibaraki, Japan
- Height: 1.71 m (5 ft 7 1/2 in)
- Position: Midfielder

Team information
- Current team: Nara Club
- Number: 40

Youth career
- 2007–2010: Komazawa University

Senior career*
| Years | Team | Apps | (Gls) |
| 2011–2012 | Mito HollyHock | 3 | (0) |
| 2013–2014 | V-Varen Nagasaki | 43 | (7) |
| 2015–2016 | Nagano Parceiro | 17 | (0) |
| 2016 | → Kagoshima United FC (loan) | 8 | (0) |
| 2017 | Vanraure Hachinohe | 24 | (5) |
| 2018– | Nara Club | 19 | (3) |
- * Club domestic league appearances and goals as of 18 November 2018

Sai Kanakubo (金久保 彩, born January 11, 1989) is a Japanese football player who currently plays for Nara Club.

== Club statistics ==
Updated to 18 November 2018.

| Club performance | | | League | | Cup | | Other | | Total | |
| Season | Club | League | Apps | Goals | Apps | Goals | Apps | Goals | Apps | Goals |
| Japan | | | League | | Emperor's Cup | | | | Total | |
|---|---|---|---|---|---|---|---|---|---|---|
| 2011 | Mito Hollyhock | J2 League | 0 | 0 | 0 | 0 | - | | 0 | 0 |
| 2012 | Mito Hollyhock | J2 League | 3 | 0 | 0 | 0 | - | | 3 | 0 |
| 2013 | V-Varen Nagasaki | J2 League | 38 | 5 | 0 | 0 | 1 | 0 | 39 | 5 |
| 2014 | V-Varen Nagasaki | J2 League | 5 | 2 | 0 | 0 | - | | 5 | 2 |
| 2015 | Nagano Parceiro | J3 League | 16 | 0 | 1 | 0 | - | | 17 | 0 |
| 2016 | Nagano Parceiro | J3 League | 1 | 0 | – | | – | | 1 | 0 |
| 2016 | Kagoshima United FC | J3 League | 8 | 0 | 1 | 0 | – | | 9 | 0 |
| 2017 | Vanraure Hachinohe | JFL | 24 | 5 | 2 | 0 | - | | 26 | 5 |
| 2018 | Nara Club | JFL | 19 | 3 | 1 | 1 | - | | 20 | 4 |
| 2019 | Nara Club | JFL | | | | | - | | | |
| Total | | | 114 | 15 | 5 | 1 | 1 | 0 | 120 | 16 |
