= Shuto Kono =

Japanese footballer (born 1993)

Personal information
- Date of birth: 4 May 1993 (age 33)
- Place of birth: Edogawa, Tokyo, Japan
- Height: 1.79 m (5 ft 10 1/2 in)
- Position: Midfielder

Team information
- Current team: FC Oberneuland
- Number: 23

Youth career
- 2006–2010: JFA Academy Fukushima

Senior career*
Years	Team	Apps	(Gls)
2010–2016	FC Tokyo	3	(0)
2011	→ Oita Trinita (loan)	18	(0)
2012	→ Machida Zelvia (loan)	15	(1)
2013	→ V-Varen Nagasaki (loan)	32	(2)
2014	→ JEF United Chiba (loan)	13	(1)
2014–2015	→ J.League U-22 (loan)	4	(0)
2016	→ FC Tokyo U-23 (loan)	11	(0)
2016	→ Renofa Yamaguchi (loan)	8	(0)
2017–2019	V-Varen Nagasaki	32	(3)
2020	Sydney Olympic		
2020	Ichikawa SC		
2021	Nankatsu SC	1	(0)
2022–	FC Oberneuland	3	(0)

International career
2009	Japan U-17	1	(0)
- * Club domestic league appearances and goals as of 17:44, 3 March 2022 (UTC)

Shuto Kono (幸野 志有人, born 4 May 1993) is a Japanese football player who currently plays as a midfielder for FC Oberneuland.

== National team career ==
In October 2009, Kono was elected Japan U-17 national team for 2009 U-17 World Cup. He played 1 match against Switzerland.

== Club statistics ==
Updated to 23 February 2017.

Club	Season	League		Cup		League Cup		AFC		Total	
Club	Season	Apps	Goals	Apps	Goals	Apps	Goals	Apps	Goals	Apps	Goals
FC Tokyo	2010	0	0	1	0	0	0	–		1	0
Oita Trinita	2011	18	0	2	0	–		–		20	0
FC Tokyo	2012	3	0	–		0	0	0	0	3	0
Machida Zelvia	2012	15	1	2	0	–		–		17	1
V-Varen Nagasaki	2013	32	2	1	0	–		–		32	2
FC Tokyo	2014	0	0	0	0	1	0	–		1	0
JEF United Chiba	2014	13	1	1	0	–		–		14	1
FC Tokyo	2015	0	0	0	0	0	0	–		0	0
FC Tokyo	2016	0	0	–		–		1	0	1	0
FC Tokyo U-23	2016	11	0	–		–		–		11	0
Renofa Yamaguchi	2016	8	0	1	1	–		–		9	1
Career total		100	4	8	1	1	0	1	0	110	5
