= Ryota Takasugi =

Japanese footballer

Ryota Takasugi 髙杉 亮太
Personal information
- Full name: Ryota Takasugi
- Date of birth: January 10, 1984 (age 42)
- Place of birth: Ube, Yamaguchi, Japan
- Height: 1.82 m (6 ft 0 in)
- Position: Centre back

Team information
- Current team: Tochigi SC
- Number: 4

Youth career
- 2002–2005: Meiji University

Senior career*
Years	Team	Apps	(Gls)
2006	Machida Zelvia	13	(4)
2007–2012	Ehime FC	135	(5)
2013–2019	V-Varen Nagasaki	192	(9)
2020–	Tochigi SC	2	(0)
- * Club domestic league appearances and goals as of 11:47, 7 July 2020 (UTC)

Ryota Takasugi (髙杉 亮太, Takasugi Ryōta; born January 10, 1984 in Ube, Yamaguchi) is a Japanese football player currently playing for Tochigi SC.

== Club career statistics ==
Updated to 28 February 2020.

Club performance			League		Cup		League Cup		Other		Total	
Season	Club	League	Apps	Goals	Apps	Goals	Apps	Goals	Apps	Goals	Apps	Goals
Japan			League		Emperor's Cup		J.League Cup		Other^{1}		Total	
2006	Machida Zelvia	JRL	13	4	-		-		-		13	4
2007	Ehime FC	J2 League	12	1	0	0	-		-		12	1
2008	Ehime FC	J2 League	36	0	2	0	-		-		38	0
2009	Ehime FC	J2 League	22	0	0	0	-		-		22	0
2010	Ehime FC	J2 League	22	1	0	0	-		-		22	1
2011	Ehime FC	J2 League	35	3	0	0	-		-		35	3
2012	Ehime FC	J2 League	8	0	0	0	-		-		8	0
2013	V-Varen Nagasaki	J2 League	28	3	1	0	-		1	0	30	3
2014	V-Varen Nagasaki	J2 League	25	1	2	1	-		-		27	2
2015	V-Varen Nagasaki	J2 League	31	0	0	0	-		1	0	32	0
2016	V-Varen Nagasaki	J2 League	32	1	1	0	-		-		33	1
2017	V-Varen Nagasaki	J2 League	28	2	0	0	-		-		28	2
2018	V-Varen Nagasaki	J1 League	30	1	1	0	0	0	-		31	1
2019	J2 League	16	1	0	0	1	0	-		17	1	
2020	Tochigi SC	J2 League	21	0	0	0	0	0	0	0	0	
Total			359	19	7	1	1	0	2	0	348	20

^{1}Includes Promotion Playoffs to J1.
