= Koichi Sato (footballer) =

Japanese footballer

Koichi Sato 佐藤 洸一
Personal information
- Full name: Koichi Sato
- Date of birth: November 28, 1986 (age 39)
- Place of birth: Yokkaichi, Mie, Japan
- Height: 1.84 m (6 ft 0 in)
- Position: Forward

Team information
- Current team: Veertien Mie
- Number: 18

Youth career
- Hinaga FC
- 1999–2001: Yokkaichi Minami Junior High School
- 2002–2004: Yokkaichi Nishi High School

College career
Years	Team	Apps	(Gls)
2005–2008	Yokkaichi University		

Senior career*
Years	Team	Apps	(Gls)
2008–2012	FC Gifu	148	(39)
2013–2016	V-Varen Nagasaki	129	(31)
2017–2018	Zweigen Kanazawa	72	(19)
2019	Ventforet Kofu	19	(4)
2020–2022	Veertien Mie	32	(2)
Total		400	(95)
- * Club domestic league appearances and goals as of 15:10, 4 June 2025 (UTC)

Koichi Sato (佐藤 洸一, Satō Kōichi; born November 28, 1986) is a Japanese former football player who played as a forward.

== Career ==
On 28 December 2016, Sato was announced at fellow J2 club Zweigen Kanazawa on a permanent transfer. He enjoyed a high goalscoring spell during the 2017 season, scoring 15 goals and assisting 5 times by November.

On 26 December 2018, Sato was announced at fellow J2 club Ventforet Kofu on a permanent transfer. On 23 November 2019, the club announced that Sato would not be extending his contract for the 2020 season with the club.

On 8 January 2020, Sato was announced at Japan Football League club Veertien Mie on a permanent transfer.

On 28 November 2022, Sato announced his retirement from football, retiring from football at the end of the 2022 season at his hometown club of Veertien Mie.

== Style of play ==
Sato is described as a defensive, energetic player who is good at pressing play.

== Club statistics ==
Updated to 23 February 2020.

Club performance			League		Cup		Total	
Season	Club	League	Apps	Goals	Apps	Goals	Apps	Goals
Japan			League		Emperor's Cup		Total	
2008	FC Gifu	J2 League	1	1	–		1	1
2009	FC Gifu	J2 League	43	16	4	2	47	18
2010	FC Gifu	J2 League	35	5	1	0	36	5
2011	FC Gifu	J2 League	36	7	1	0	37	7
2012	FC Gifu	J2 League	33	10	0	0	33	10
2013	V-Varen Nagasaki	J2 League	42	12	1	0	43	12
2014	V-Varen Nagasaki	J2 League	32	12	2	1	34	13
2015	V-Varen Nagasaki	J2 League	29	3	2	4	31	7
2016	V-Varen Nagasaki	J2 League	26	4	1	0	27	4
2017	Zweigen Kanazawa	J2 League	42	16	2	0	44	16
2018	Zweigen Kanazawa	J2 League	30	3	2	1	32	4
2019	Ventforet Kofu	J2 League	19	4	2	0	21	4
Total			368	93	18	8	386	101
