= Ryota Arimitsu =

Japanese footballer (born 1981)

Ryota Arimitsu 有光 亮太
Personal information
- Full name: Ryota Arimitsu
- Date of birth: 21 April 1981 (age 45)
- Place of birth: Iizuka, Fukuoka, Japan
- Height: 1.74 m (5 ft 9 in)
- Position: Forward

Youth career
- 1997–1999: Tokai University Daigo High School

Senior career*
Years	Team	Apps	(Gls)
2000–2001	Real Cesate		
2003–2006	Avispa Fukuoka	58	(11)
2007–2013	V-Varen Nagasaki	162	(80)
Total		220	(91)
- * Club domestic league appearances and goals

Ryota Arimitsu (有光 亮太, Arimitsu Ryōta; born 21 April 1981) is a Japanese former professional footballer who played as a forward.

== Club statistics ==
Club	Season	League			Cup		League Cup		Total	
Club	Season	Division	Apps	Goals	Apps	Goals	Apps	Goals	Apps	Goals
Avispa Fukuoka	2003	J2 League	0	0	0	0	—		0	0
Avispa Fukuoka	2004	J2 League	19	6	2	0	—		21	6
Avispa Fukuoka	2005	J2 League	28	5	2	0	—		30	5
Avispa Fukuoka	2006	J1 League	11	0	1	0	3	1	15	1
Avispa Fukuoka	Total		58	11	5	0	3	1	66	12
V-Varen Nagasaki	2007	Regional Leagues	20	15	3	0	—		23	15
V-Varen Nagasaki	2008	Regional Leagues	18	16	—		—		18	16
V-Varen Nagasaki	2009	Football League	31	10	2	0	—		33	10
V-Varen Nagasaki	2010	Football League	34	13	1	0	—		35	13
V-Varen Nagasaki	2011	Football League	32	19	1	0	—		33	19
V-Varen Nagasaki	2012	Football League	24	7	2	0	—		26	7
V-Varen Nagasaki	2013	J2 League	3	0	0	0	—		3	0
V-Varen Nagasaki	Total		162	80	9	0	0	0	171	80
Career total			220	91	14	0	3	1	237	92
