= 2009 Japan Football League =

Japan Football League
- Season: 2009
- Dates: 15 March – 29 November
- Champions: Sagawa Shiga; 2nd JFL title 2nd D3 title
- Promoted: New Wave Kitakyushu
- Relegated: FC Kariya; Mitsubishi Motors Mizushima
- Matches: 306
- Goals: 775 (2.53 per match)
- Top goalscorer: Shogo Shiozawa (17 goals total)
- Highest attendance: 9,856 (Round 1, New Wave vs. JEF Reserves)
- Lowest attendance: 109 (Round 28, Printing vs. Arte)
- Average attendance: 1,189

The 2009 Japan Football League (Japanese: 第11回日本フットボールリーグ, Hepburn: Dai Jūikkai Nihon Futtobōru Rīgu) was the eleventh season of the Japan Football League, the third tier of the Japanese football league system.

== Overview ==
2009 JFL teams

At the end of the 2008 season, three new clubs were promoted from the Japanese Regional Leagues by virtue of their final placing in the Regional League promotion series:

- Machida Zelvia, Kanto Football League First Division champions
- V-Varen Nagasaki, Kyushu Football League runners-up
- Honda Lock, 3rd place at the All Japan Senior Football Championship (3rd place in Kyushu Football League)

Machida Zelvia and V-Varen Nagasaki were approved as J. League associate members at the annual meeting in January.

Sagawa Shiga won their second championship title since 2007 season.

== Table ==
Pos	Team	Pld	W	D	L	GF	GA	GD	Pts	Promotion or relegation
1	Sagawa Shiga (Note: Occupied one of the top 4 places at the end of the first half of the season (17th week) and were seeded for 2009 Emperor's Cup. These clubs were automatically qualified for the tournament, while each of other JFL clubs had to go through the prefectural qualifier.) (C)	34	19	9	6	62	36	+26	66	
2	Yokogawa Musashino	34	17	9	8	48	34	+14	60	
3	Sony Sendai	34	17	8	9	49	30	+19	59	
4	New Wave Kitakyushu (Note: J. League Associate Membership and submitted applications to J. League board by 30 September.) (P)	34	16	10	8	49	31	+18	58	Promotion to 2010 J. League Division 2 (Note: Must hold J. League Associate Membership and submit applications to J. League board by 30 September, finish no less than in fourth place and pass a final inspection by J. League to be promoted. V-Varen Nagasaki and Machida Zelvia, both associate members, announced that they would not submit applications for this year due to some unresolved problems pointed out by J. League at the preliminary review.)
5	Gainare Tottori	34	16	8	10	65	37	+28	56	
6	Machida Zelvia	34	14	12	8	38	30	+8	54	
7	Honda FC	34	13	12	9	49	38	+11	51	
8	MIO Biwako Kusatsu	34	13	9	12	51	43	+8	48	
9	SP Kyoto	34	14	5	15	56	46	+10	47	
10	TDK SC	34	14	4	16	39	54	−15	46	
11	V-Varen Nagasaki	34	12	8	14	38	43	−5	44	
12	JEF Reserves	34	9	14	11	26	37	−11	41	
13	Honda Lock	34	9	13	12	34	38	−4	40	
14	Arte Takasaki	34	9	13	12	34	46	−12	40	
15	Ryutsu Keizai University	34	11	7	16	41	55	−14	40	
16	FC Ryukyu	34	11	5	18	42	57	−15	38	
17	FC Kariya (R)	34	7	10	17	26	51	−25	31	Promotion/relegation Series (Note: Series' occurrence is dependent on the number of places available after promotions to J2.)
18	Mitsubishi Motors Mizushima (R)	34	4	6	24	28	69	−41	18	Relegation to Okayama prefectural league (Note: Mitsubishi Mizushima F.C. submitted a letter to JFL headquarters on 30 September regarding withdrawal from JFL by the end of 2009 season regardless of their 2009 results due to "various factors including recent economic slump." However, Chugoku Soccer League, one of nine Japanese Regional Leagues, declined to accept Mizushima as its 2010 league member because of their voluntary withdrawal from JFL. Therefore, the highest division which Mizushima will be able to play in 2010 season is Okayama prefectural league division 1.)

Updated to match(es) played on November 29, 2009. Source: Japan Football League
Rules for classification: 1) points; 2) goal difference; 3) number of goals scored.
(C) Champions; (P) Promoted; (R) Relegated

== Results ==
Home \ Away	ART	GAI	HON	LOC	JER	KAR	RKU	MIO	MMM	NWK	PRI	RYU	SSH	SON	TDK	VVN	YMC	ZEL
Arte Takasaki		1–1	0–0	1–1	2–1	3–0	1–1	3–1	1–1	1–2	0–2	1–5	1–4	0–0	2–2	0–2	0–0	0–3
Gainare Tottori	2–2		1–3	0–1	5–0	4–0	0–1	1–0	4–1	0–0	3–0	2–0	1–2	0–0	5–1	3–1	1–1	1–0
Honda FC	0–0	2–1		0–0	1–2	1–2	1–0	1–4	2–1	2–1	1–2	3–1	0–1	1–1	2–3	2–1	0–2	0–3
Honda Lock	1–0	3–3	0–0		0–1	0–0	2–0	1–1	0–0	1–3	4–2	0–2	1–0	0–1	2–0	0–2	1–2	2–0
JEF Reserves	0–0	1–1	1–1	1–1		1–1	1–2	2–0	2–1	0–0	1–0	0–1	0–1	2–0	0–0	0–1	1–1	0–0
FC Kariya	1–2	4–2	1–6	0–0	0–0		2–2	3–2	3–1	0–3	0–0	2–1	1–2	0–1	0–1	0–1	0–0	1–1
Ryutsu Keizai University	0–2	0–4	1–2	3–0	0–1	1–0		3–0	1–2	1–1	1–2	0–0	5–0	4–3	2–0	0–0	0–2	1–4
MIO Biwako Kusatsu	2–1	3–1	2–2	1–1	0–0	3–0	4–0		2–0	2–2	1–1	1–2	3–2	1–2	2–1	3–0	1–3	0–1
Mitsubishi Motors Mizushima	0–2	0–3	0–2	1–6	0–1	2–0	1–1	0–2		1–2	2–4	2–2	0–3	1–3	0–1	2–5	1–2	0–1
New Wave Kitakyushu	1–2	0–0	0–0	2–0	0–0	2–0	4–0	1–0	2–3		2–1	4–1	1–1	1–0	0–1	1–0	2–2	1–1
SP Kyoto	2–1	0–1	1–1	1–2	7–2	4–0	1–1	3–1	4–1	1–2		1–2	2–3	2–0	2–1	1–4	2–0	0–1
FC Ryukyu	1–2	1–4	0–1	2–2	1–1	0–1	1–3	1–0	0–2	0–2	2–1		0–5	2–1	2–3	0–1	2–1	1–1
Sagawa Shiga	2–0	2–1	0–4	3–0	2–0	1–1	4–0	0–0	0–0	3–1	1–1	2–3		1–1	0–0	3–0	2–2	1–3
Sony Sendai	5–0	3–1	2–2	1–1	3–0	1–0	3–0	0–1	2–0	1–0	1–0	2–1	1–2		2–3	2–0	1–2	2–0
TDK SC	1–0	0–4	1–0	2–1	3–2	1–0	0–2	2–3	2–0	4–2	2–0	0–4	1–3	0–1		1–1	0–2	1–3
V-Varen Nagasaki	0–1	1–2	2–5	2–0	1–2	0–0	1–3	1–1	2–1	1–2	0–3	1–0	2–2	0–0	2–0		2–0	0–0
Yokogawa Musashino	1–1	2–3	0–0	0–0	1–0	2–0	4–1	1–3	1–0	1–0	1–3	4–1	0–2	1–2	1–0	2–0		2–1
Machida Zelvia	1–1	1–0	1–1	1–0	0–0	0–3	2–1	1–1	1–1	0–2	1–0	1–0	0–2	1–1	2–1	1–1	1–2	

Updated to match(es) played on November 29, 2009. Source: JFL First Round, JFL Second Round
Legend: Blue = home team win; Yellow = draw; Red = away team win.

== Top scorers ==
Rank	Scorer	Club	Goals
1	(Japan) Shogo Shiozawa	SP Kyoto	17
2	(Japan) Shingo Kinoshita	MIO Biwako Kusatsu	15
2	(Japan) Gen Nakamura	Sagawa Shiga	15
4	(Japan) Keiichi Kubota	Arte Takasaki	11
4	(Japan) Junya Nitta	Honda FC	11
4	(Japan) Toshitaka Tsurumi	Gainare Tottori	11
7	(Japan) Ryota Arimitsu	V-Varen Nagasaki	10
7	(Ivory Coast) Hamed Koné	Gainare Tottori	10
7	(Japan) Shoma Mizunaga	Honda Lock	10
7	(Japan) Tomoya Osawa	Sagawa Shiga	10
7	(Japan) Yuya Sano	New Wave Kitakyushu	10
7	(Japan) Tatsuya Sekino	Yokogawa Musashino	10

== Attendance ==
Pos	Team	Total	High	Low	Average	Change
1	Gainare Tottori	58,128	6,188	1,267	3,419	+6.3%
2	New Wave Kitakyushu	57,983	9,856	1,365	3,411	+196.9%
3	V-Varen Nagasaki	46,966	5,122	1,020	2,763	+95.0%^{†}
4	Machida Zelvia	32,059	3,861	1,067	1,886	n/a^{†}
5	FC Ryukyu	22,919	2,747	618	1,348	−53.2%
6	Sagawa Shiga	18,617	2,139	316	1,095	+28.7%
7	MIO Biwako Kusatsu	16,929	2,058	338	996	+16.6%
8	Honda Lock	13,865	1,796	501	816	+109.8%^{†}
9	Yokogawa Musashino	12,950	1,326	281	762	−24.2%
10	Honda FC	12,734	2,482	335	749	−12.3%
11	TDK SC	12,594	2,563	259	741	−22.1%
12	Sony Sendai	12,425	1,990	239	731	−16.0%
13	FC Kariya	10,312	1,188	191	607	+0.5%
14	Ryutsu Keizai University	7,747	725	183	456	−16.2%
15	Mitsubishi Motors Mizushima	7,486	953	304	440	+23.9%
16	Arte Takasaki	7,166	1,121	202	422	+40.7%
17	SP Kyoto	6,715	834	109	395	+7.3%
18	JEF Reserves	6,362	713	207	374	−22.9%
	League total	363,957	9,856	109	1,189	−24.3%

Source: JFL First Round, JFL Second Round
Notes:
^{†} Team played previous season in Regional Leagues.

== Promotion and relegation ==
Due to Kitakyushu being promoted and Mitsubishi Mizushima being relegated, the Regional League promotion series winner and runner-up, Matsumoto Yamaga and Hitachi Tochigi Uva respectively, were promoted automatically. Third-placed team, Zweigen Kanazawa were set to play FC Kariya in the promotion and relegation series.

December 13, 2009
13:00

Zweigen Kanazawa	1 – 0	FC Kariya
Furube 52'	Report

Seibu Ryoku Chikouen Stadium, Kanazawa
Attendance: 2,176
Referee: Takuto Okabe

December 19, 2009
13:00

FC Kariya	1 – 1	Zweigen Kanazawa
Kusaka 87'	Report	Nemoto 31'

Kariya Municipal Athletic Park, Kariya
Attendance: 1,605
Referee: Itaru Hirose

Zweigen Kanazawa won the series at 2–1 aggregate score and earned promotion to JFL. F.C. Kariya relegated to Tōkai regional league.
