= 2010 Japan Football League =

Japan Football League
- Season: 2010
- Dates: 14 March – 28 November
- Champions: Gainare Tottori; 1st JFL title 1st D3 title
- Promoted: Gainare Tottori
- Relegated: Ryutsu Keizai University
- Matches played: 306
- Goals scored: 847 (2.77 per match)
- Top goalscorer: Sho Gokyu (27 goals total)
- Highest attendance: 9,499 (Round 25, Gainare vs. Sagawa)
- Lowest attendance: 0 (Round 19, Lock vs. Zweigen)
- Average attendance: 1,464

The 2010 Japan Football League (Japanese: 第12回日本フットボールリーグ, Hepburn: Dai Jūni-kai Nihon Futtobōru Rīgu) was the twelfth season of the Japan Football League, the third tier of the Japanese football league system.

== Overview ==
2010 JFL teams

At the end of the 2009 season, three new clubs were promoted from the Japanese Regional Leagues by virtue of their final placing in the Regional League promotion series:

- Matsumoto Yamaga and Hitachi Tochigi Uva were promoted automatically.
- Zweigen Kanazawa won the play-off series against FC Kariya.

Before the season corporate TDK SC were renamed to Blaublitz Akita and started operations as an independent football club. Hitachi Tochigi Uva S.C. has dropped the company prefix and changed its name to simply Tochigi Uva F.C.

Matsumoto Yamaga were approved as J. League associate members at the annual meeting in February. Zweigen Kanazawa applied for the membership later in April but the application was not accepted because of incomplete documentation.

Gainare Tottori are the first club to be promoted to J. League Division 2 as champions since Ehime FC in 2005 season.

== Table ==
Pos	Team	Pld	W	D	L	GF	GA	GD	Pts	Promotion or relegation
1	Gainare Tottori (Note: J. League Associate Membership and passed a final inspection by J. League.) (C, P)	34	24	5	5	64	31	+33	77 (Note: Occupied one of the top 3 places at the end of the first half of the season (17th week) and were seeded for 2010 Emperor's Cup. These clubs were automatically qualified for the tournament, while each of other JFL clubs had to go through the prefectural qualifier.)	Promotion to 2011 J.League Division 2 (Note: Must hold J. League Associate Membership, pass a final inspection by J. League and finish no less than in fourth place to be promoted. Machida Zelvia have announced that their stadium is not meeting the J. League standards so they are not eligible for the promotion till 2012 season. Later the announcement of the same kind was made by V-Varen Nagasaki, although their eligibility date is as far as 2013 season.)
2	Sagawa Shiga	34	17	11	6	69	35	+34	62	
3	Machida Zelvia	34	19	4	11	71	44	+27	61	
4	Honda FC	34	18	5	11	52	43	+9	59	
5	V-Varen Nagasaki	34	15	8	11	50	38	+12	53	
6	SP Kyoto	34	15	8	11	54	46	+8	53	
7	Matsumoto Yamaga	34	15	7	12	48	41	+7	52	
8	Blaublitz Akita	34	14	9	11	54	41	+13	51	
9	Zweigen Kanazawa	34	13	9	12	46	41	+5	48	
10	FC Ryukyu	34	14	6	14	51	51	0	48	
11	MIO Biwako Kusatsu	34	13	7	14	51	56	−5	46	
12	Yokogawa Musashino	34	12	9	13	34	38	−4	45	
13	Honda Lock	34	10	12	12	36	39	−3	42	
14	Sony Sendai	34	11	9	14	34	42	−8	42	
15	Tochigi Uva	34	7	10	17	41	75	−34	31	
16	JEF Reserves	34	7	9	18	31	55	−24	30	
17	Arte Takasaki	34	7	8	19	28	51	−23	29	Promotion/relegation Series (Note: Play-off series' and direct relegation occurrence is dependent on the number of places available after promotions to J2.)
18	Ryutsu Keizai University (R)	34	5	4	25	33	80	−47	19	Relegation to Regional Leagues

Updated to match(es) played on November 28, 2010. Source: Japan Football League
Rules for classification: 1) points; 2) goal difference; 3) number of goals scored.
(C) Champions; (P) Promoted; (R) Relegated

== Results ==
Home \ Away	ART	BLA	GAI	HON	LOC	JER	RKU	MIO	PRI	RYU	SSH	SON	UVA	VVN	YAM	YMC	ZEL	ZWE
Arte Takasaki		0–1	0–3	1–2	1–1	1–1	1–0	1–4	0–1	1–2	0–2	0–0	1–1	0–2	2–2	1–0	2–4	1–1
Blaublitz Akita	2–0		3–2	5–0	1–1	3–0	4–2	3–0	1–1	2–1	2–3	1–0	1–1	0–0	1–3	1–1	1–2	2–2
Gainare Tottori	1–0	2–0		1–0	0–0	2–1	2–1	1–0	4–2	3–0	3–1	3–1	2–1	2–1	3–0	2–1	3–2	3–1
Honda FC	1–2	3–1	1–3		2–0	2–1	1–0	1–2	2–1	0–1	2–0	0–0	4–0	1–0	0–3	2–0	2–1	2–0
Honda Lock	0–1	2–2	0–0	2–2		3–0	3–2	3–4	1–0	0–1	0–0	2–1	1–2	1–2	0–1	3–0	2–1	1–1
JEF Reserves	1–3	1–2	0–3	1–0	3–0		1–2	0–0	0–0	2–1	0–0	1–0	1–1	1–2	1–0	0–1	2–3	1–3
Ryutsu Keizai University	1–0	0–1	1–3	1–2	0–2	1–2		2–2	0–3	0–3	2–5	1–3	2–0	0–4	1–2	0–1	0–3	2–4
MIO Biwako Kusatsu	3–0	1–0	5–0	0–1	2–2	5–0	0–1		2–0	2–1	1–2	2–0	0–1	2–3	2–2	0–2	4–3	1–0
SP Kyoto	2–1	2–1	0–0	3–4	1–0	1–0	2–2	8–2		2–1	0–3	0–1	3–0	3–3	0–2	2–0	1–4	1–2
FC Ryukyu	1–2	1–0	1–1	2–2	1–2	2–2	0–2	4–1	3–3		1–1	2–1	2–2	2–1	0–2	0–1	3–1	3–1
Sagawa Shiga	1–0	4–1	4–1	2–0	2–0	2–2	7–0	3–0	2–0	3–0		1–2	5–1	1–0	1–2	2–2	1–1	2–2
Sony Sendai	1–1	1–0	1–1	0–3	0–0	0–0	3–2	1–1	2–3	1–0	1–1		0–0	2–3	3–2	2–1	2–1	0–1
Tochigi Uva	2–1	1–5	0–6	4–4	0–1	1–0	2–2	1–1	1–2	2–5	2–3	4–0		0–2	2–2	1–0	1–4	1–3
V-Varen Nagasaki	1–0	1–1	1–2	1–2	2–0	0–1	3–1	1–1	1–1	4–2	2–1	1–0	5–2		1–0	0–1	0–1	0–1
Matsumoto Yamaga	0–0	1–2	1–0	1–0	0–2	5–1	2–1	6–0	0–1	0–2	0–0	0–2	2–3	1–1		1–0	1–2	1–0
Yokogawa Musashino	3–1	1–1	0–1	1–1	3–0	2–2	0–0	1–0	1–4	0–1	2–1	1–0	0–0	0–0	0–1		2–3	3–2
Machida Zelvia	2–3	1–0	0–1	1–2	1–1	2–1	5–1	2–0	0–0	1–2	1–1	3–1	3–1	3–0	6–1	1–2		2–0
Zweigen Kanazawa	2–0	0–3	1–0	2–1	0–0	2–1	4–0	0–1	0–1	3–0	2–2	0–1	1–0	2–2	1–1	1–1	0–1	

Updated to match(es) played on November 28, 2010. Source: First round, Second round
Legend: Blue = home team win; Yellow = draw; Red = away team win.

== Top scorers ==
Rank	Scorer	Club	Goals
1	(Japan) Sho Gokyu	Sagawa Shiga	27
2	(Japan) Masatoshi Matsuda	Blaublitz Akita	24
3	(Japan) Yoshinori Katsumata	Machida Zelvia	18
4	(Japan) Ryosuke Kijima	Machida Zelvia	16
5	(Japan) Ryota Arimitsu	V-Varen Nagasaki	13
5	(Japan) Shunta Takahashi	Tochigi Uva	13
7	(Japan) Shintaro Hirai	SP Kyoto	11
8	(Japan) Michiaki Kakimoto	Matsumoto Yamaga	10
8	(Ivory Coast) Hamed Koné	Gainare Tottori	10
8	(Japan) Junya Nitta	Honda FC	10
8	(Japan) Kodai Suzuki	Honda FC	10

== Attendance ==
Pos	Team	Total	High	Low	Average	Change
1	Matsumoto Yamaga	86,357	8,243	3,271	5,080	+45.9%^{†}
2	Machida Zelvia	59,552	7,081	1,411	3,503	+85.7%
3	Gainare Tottori	59,318	9,499	1,837	3,489	+2.0%
4	V-Varen Nagasaki	42,917	5,942	1,155	2,525	−8.6%
5	FC Ryukyu	30,207	3,698	424	1,777	+31.8%
6	Zweigen Kanazawa	26,314	6,894	476	1,548	+4.1%^{†}
7	Blaublitz Akita	21,349	2,183	845	1,256	+69.5%
8	Sagawa Shiga	20,108	2,801	517	1,183	+8.0%
9	MIO Biwako Kusatsu	13,474	2,144	163	793	−20.4%
10	Honda FC	13,258	2,489	316	780	+4.1%
11	Yokogawa Musashino	13,196	1,212	449	776	+1.8%
12	Sony Sendai	12,919	1,958	400	760	+4.0%
13	Tochigi Uva	12,753	1,313	361	750	n/a^{†}
14	Honda Lock	9,135	1,225	0	537	−34.2%^{‡}
15	Ryutsu Keizai University	7,454	958	184	438	−3.9%
16	Arte Takasaki	7,318	1,021	186	430	+1.9%
17	SP Kyoto	6,830	743	169	402	+1.8%
18	JEF Reserves	5,515	555	133	324	−13.4%
	League total	447,974	9,499	0	1,464	+23.1%

Updated to games played on November 28, 2010
Source: First round, Second round
Notes:
^{†} Team played previous season in Regional Leagues.
^{‡} Some Honda Lock games were played without spectators because of the foot-and-mouth disease outbreak in Miyazaki Prefecture.

== Promotion and relegation ==
Due to Gainare Tottori being promoted to J2, the Regional League promotion series champions and runners-up, Kamatamare Sanuki and Nagano Parceiro, were promoted automatically. The third-placed Sanyo Electric Sumoto S.C. faced Arte Takasaki in the promotion and relegation series.

December 11, 2010
13:00

Sanyo Electric Sumoto S.C.	0 – 3	Arte Takasaki
	Report	Kawasato 38'; Iwama 44'; Yoshida 64'

Asupa Sports Park Ground, Sumoto
Attendance: 680
Referee: Jumpei Iida

December 19, 2010
13:00

Arte Takasaki	1 – 1	Sanyo Electric Sumoto S.C.
Yoshida 90+1'	Report	Ota 19'

Takasaki Hamakawa Athletic Stadium, Takasaki
Attendance: 1,173
Referee: Itaru Hirose

Arte Takasaki won the series 4–1 on aggregate and stayed in JFL.
