= 2011 Japan Football League =

Japan Football League
- Season: 2011
- Champions: Sagawa Shiga; 3rd JFL title 3rd D3 title
- Promoted: Machida Zelvia; Matsumoto Yamaga
- Relegated: Arte Takasaki (withdrawn); JEF Reserves (withdrawn)
- Matches: 289
- Goals: 792 (2.74 per match)
- Top goalscorer: Masatoshi Matsuda (20 goals)
- Highest attendance: 11,956; Yamaga vs Sony
- Lowest attendance: 91; Printing vs Lock
- Average attendance: 1,682

The 2011 Japan Football League (Japanese: 第13回日本フットボールリーグ, Hepburn: Dai Jūsan-kai Nihon Futtobōru Rīgu) was the thirteenth season of the Japan Football League, the third tier of the Japanese football league system. It was scheduled to begin at 13 March 2011 and to end at 27 November 2011; however, the start of the season has been delayed to 23 April due to the aftermath of the 2011 Tōhoku earthquake and tsunami. As a result, the ending date of the season was moved to 11 December.

== Overview ==
2011 JFL teams
2011 JFL teams in Keihanshin

At the end of the 2010 season, two new clubs, Kamatamare Sanuki and Nagano Parceiro, were promoted from the Japanese Regional Leagues by virtue of their final placing in the Regional League promotion series.

Kamatamare Sanuki were approved as J. League associate members at the annual meeting in February. Applications by Zweigen Kanazawa and FC Ryukyu were given "continuous deliberations" status with further efforts required to obtain the membership.

The earthquake and tsunami led to significant changes in competition schedule. Besides the postponement of the tournament, Sony Sendai, who were the most affected by disaster and could not recover in time, asked the league to put them on temporary hiatus. Missing the first eleven rounds (7th to 17th), Sony re-joined the league on 3 July and continued participation from then on. The final tournament schedule is as follows:

- Every team in the league will play 33 games: Two against each other (home and away) and one against Sony Sendai according to the schedule of the second half of the tournament (rounds 18th to 34th).
- Sony Sendai will play 17 games against every other team in the second half of the tournament.
- Sony Sendai will also participate in the rescheduled games of rounds 1–6, called "Matches for reconstruction assistance of Tōhoku earthquake and tsunami" (東日本大震災 災害復興支援試合). Although those games are treated as official JFL matches, they will not be included into the league results.
- For the purpose of determining the relegated teams, Sony Sendai can add points gained in six aforementioned "reconstruction" games to their official 17-match outcome. Thus, Sony Sendai will be judged by 23 matches, while every other team – by 33.

On 3 August JEF Reserves had submitted a request of withdrawal from the league at the end of the season due to difficult financial conditions and poor performances of the team. The request was approved by the league Board on 12 September.

In the penultimate round Sagawa Shiga won their third JFL championship in only five years of existence, firmly placing themselves among the strongest amateur teams in Japan. Two clubs, Machida Zelvia and Matsumoto Yamaga were promoted to J.League 2.

By virtue of their placing in the Regional League promotion series, three clubs were promoted to JFL at the end of the season: YSCC Yokohama, Fujieda MYFC, and Hoyo AC Elan Oita. Because of JEF Reserves' withdrawal, no additional promotion and relegation play-offs were held.

== Table ==
| Pos | Team | Pld | W | D | L | GF | GA | GD | Pts | Promotion or relegation |
|---|---|---|---|---|---|---|---|---|---|---|
| 1 | Sagawa Shiga (C) | 33 | 23 | 1 | 9 | 60 | 34 | +26 | 70 | |
| 2 | Nagano Parceiro | 33 | 19 | 6 | 8 | 51 | 27 | +24 | 63 | |
| 3 | Machida Zelvia (P) | 33 | 18 | 7 | 8 | 61 | 28 | +33 | 61 | Promotion to 2012 J. League Division 2 (Note: Must hold J. League Associate Membership, pass a final inspection by J. League and finish no less than in fourth place to be promoted. V-Varen Nagasaki, though being an associate members, have announced that their stadium is not matching the J. League standards so they are not eligible for the promotion until the completion of necessary renovations. The target date is set for 2013 season. Because the maximum capacity of Division 2 set by J. League is 22 teams, no more than two clubs can be promoted.) |
| 4 | Matsumoto Yamaga (Note: J. League Associate Membership and passed a final inspection by J. League.) (P) | 33 | 17 | 8 | 8 | 60 | 38 | +22 | 59 | Promotion to 2012 J. League Division 2 |
| 5 | V-Varen Nagasaki | 33 | 15 | 11 | 7 | 61 | 44 | +17 | 56 | |
| 6 | Honda FC | 33 | 15 | 7 | 11 | 40 | 36 | +4 | 52 | |
| 7 | Zweigen Kanazawa | 33 | 13 | 8 | 12 | 49 | 40 | +9 | 47 | |
| 8 | Honda Lock (Note: FC Ryukyu and Honda Lock occupied top 2 places at the end of the 17th round (11th week) and were seeded for 2011 Emperor's Cup. These clubs were automatically qualified for the tournament, while each of other JFL clubs had to go through the prefectural qualifier.) | 33 | 12 | 11 | 10 | 47 | 45 | +2 | 47 | |
| 9 | FC Ryukyu | 33 | 14 | 4 | 15 | 47 | 51 | −4 | 46 | |
| 10 | Tochigi Uva | 33 | 12 | 9 | 12 | 40 | 43 | −3 | 45 | |
| 11 | Kamatamare Sanuki | 33 | 11 | 7 | 15 | 39 | 49 | −10 | 40 | |
| 12 | SP Kyoto | 33 | 11 | 5 | 17 | 43 | 61 | −18 | 38 | |
| 13 | MIO Biwako Kusatsu | 33 | 11 | 5 | 17 | 43 | 65 | −22 | 38 | |
| 14 | Blaublitz Akita | 33 | 10 | 7 | 16 | 38 | 52 | −14 | 37 | |
| 15 | Yokogawa Musashino | 33 | 9 | 9 | 15 | 33 | 37 | −4 | 36 | |
| 16 | Arte Takasaki (R) | 33 | 9 | 7 | 17 | 39 | 55 | −16 | 34 | Withdrawn (Note: Arte Takasaki decided to withdraw from JFL and fold the club after the end of the season, when clubs promoted from regional leagues were already determined. JFL decided that the next season will be contested by 17 clubs (i.e. without supplying an additional club from a regional league).) |
| 17 | JEF Reserves (R) | 33 | 4 | 7 | 22 | 27 | 63 | −36 | 19 | Withdrawn (Note: JEF Reserves had submitted a request of withdrawal from the league at the end of the season regardless of team's performance. It was approved by league board on 12 September.) |
| 18 | Sony Sendai | 17 | 3 | 7 | 7 | 14 | 24 | −10 | 16 | |

Updated to match(es) played on 11 December 2011. Source: Japan Football League
Rules for classification: 1) points; 2) goal difference; 3) number of goals scored.
(C) Champions; (P) Promoted; (R) Relegated

== Results ==
| Home \ Away | ART | BLA | HON | LOC | JER | KAM | MIO | PAR | PRI | RYU | SSH | SON | UVA | VVN | YAM | YMC | ZEL | ZWE |
|---|---|---|---|---|---|---|---|---|---|---|---|---|---|---|---|---|---|---|
| Arte Takasaki | | 2–2 | 1–3 | 2–2 | 2–1 | 2–3 | 0–1 | 0–1 | 0–1 | 1–2 | 4–3 | 1–1 | 1–1 | 0–1 | 1–5 | 1–1 | 0–1 | 0–3 |
| Blaublitz Akita | 0–1 | | 0–2 | 0–3 | 2–1 | 2–0 | 1–2 | 0–2 | 2–3 | 0–1 | 1–2 | 1–0 | 2–1 | 0–2 | 3–2 | 0–1 | 2–1 | 1–3 |
| Honda FC | 2–1 | 1–0 | | 3–3 | 1–1 | 1–1 | 2–0 | 0–3 | 2–1 | 2–1 | 0–1 | 0–0 | 2–0 | 0–2 | 3–0 | 0–2 | 0–4 | 2–1 |
| Honda Lock | 1–1 | 1–1 | 3–2 | | 2–0 | 1–0 | 2–1 | 1–2 | 6–1 | 0–4 | 0–3 | | 2–2 | 1–3 | 0–2 | 0–1 | 0–1 | 1–1 |
| JEF Reserves | 2–3 | 1–1 | 1–2 | 0–3 | | 3–3 | 3–1 | 0–1 | 2–3 | 0–2 | 3–1 | | 0–1 | 1–2 | 0–2 | 0–1 | 0–2 | 0–2 |
| Kamatamare Sanuki | 3–1 | 2–1 | 0–1 | 1–1 | 1–1 | | 1–2 | 1–0 | 3–2 | 2–1 | 1–2 | | 1–1 | 1–1 | 4–2 | 1–0 | 0–3 | 1–2 |
| MIO Biwako Kusatsu | 3–1 | 1–2 | 1–0 | 0–2 | 1–0 | 2–1 | | 3–1 | 2–2 | 1–2 | 1–4 | | 1–1 | 0–6 | 0–2 | 4–1 | 1–6 | 2–0 |
| Nagano Parceiro | 1–0 | 4–1 | 0–0 | 1–1 | 4–0 | 2–1 | 4–1 | | 0–0 | 3–1 | 0–1 | | 2–1 | 0–0 | 1–1 | 0–2 | 1–0 | 0–3 |
| SP Kyoto | 2–2 | 2–0 | 0–1 | 1–2 | 0–1 | 2–1 | 2–1 | 2–0 | | 4–1 | 0–2 | 1–2 | 1–2 | 2–3 | 1–1 | 2–1 | 0–2 | 0–0 |
| FC Ryukyu | 3–2 | 0–1 | 1–0 | 0–2 | 0–2 | 2–0 | 1–4 | 0–4 | 0–4 | | 2–1 | 4–0 | 4–0 | 1–3 | 0–1 | 1–1 | 0–0 | 1–1 |
| Sagawa Shiga | 2–0 | 2–1 | 3–2 | 1–2 | 4–0 | 2–0 | 1–0 | 2–1 | 1–2 | 2–1 | | 2–0 | 2–1 | 0–1 | 2–1 | 1–0 | 3–3 | 0–1 |
| Sony Sendai | | | 1–1 (Note: The postponed Sony Sendai matches from rounds 1–6, called "Matches for reconstruction assistance of 2011 Tōhoku earthquake and tsunami" (東日本大震災 災害復興支援試合). Those games are treated as official JFL matches but are not included into the final results.) | 1–1 | 0–0 | 3–0 | 1–1 | 0–2 | 1–1 | | 0–0 | | | 1–1 | 0–2 | | 1–0 | 1–4 |
| Tochigi Uva | 0–1 | 1–1 | 1–3 | 1–0 | 3–0 | 1–0 | 3–2 | 0–2 | 1–0 | 2–2 | 1–3 | 3–2 | | 4–0 | 1–2 | 1–0 | 1–0 | 0–1 |
| V-Varen Nagasaki | 1–2 | 2–2 | 1–1 | 1–1 | 3–3 | 0–1 | 2–1 | 0–2 | 6–0 | 1–3 | 2–1 | 0–1 | 2–2 | | 1–1 | 1–0 | 5–1 | 0–2 |
| Matsumoto Yamaga | 1–2 | 1–2 | 1–1 | 2–0 | 1–1 | 2–2 | 3–2 | 2–1 | 6–0 | 1–0 | 1–2 | 0–3 | 3–1 | 1–1 | | 2–2 | 2–0 | 2–0 |
| Yokogawa Musashino | 0–1 | 3–3 | 0–1 | 0–0 | 4–0 | 0–1 | 0–0 | 0–2 | 2–0 | 1–2 | 0–1 | 1–1 (Note: The game was originally scheduled to 7 August, but was abandoned after the first half (0–0) because of the heavy thunderstorm. The remaining 45 minutes were played on 19 October.) | 0–1 | 3–4 | 0–2 | | 0–0 | 3–3 |
| Machida Zelvia | 1–3 | 1–1 | 1–0 | 4–0 | 1–0 | 2–0 | 6–0 | 2–2 | 2–0 | 5–1 | 2–1 | 0–0 | 0–0 | 3–0 | 3–1 | 1–2 | | 2–0 |
| Zweigen Kanazawa | 1–0 | 1–2 | 1–0 | 2–3 | 4–0 | 1–2 | 1–1 | 1–2 | 4–1 | 0–3 | 0–2 | | 1–1 | 3–3 | 1–2 | 0–1 | 1–1 | |

Updated to match(es) played on 11 December 2011. Source: Japan Football League: First round, second round
Legend: Blue = home team win; Yellow = draw; Red = away team win.

== Top scorers ==
| Rank | Scorer | Club | Goals |
|---|---|---|---|
| 1 | (Japan) Masatoshi Matsuda | Blaublitz Akita | 20 |
| 2 | (Japan) Ryota Arimitsu | V-Varen Nagasaki | 19 |
| 2 | (Japan) Tetsuya Kijima | Matsumoto Yamaga | 19 |
| 4 | (Japan) Yoshinori Katsumata | Machida Zelvia | 16 |
| 5 | (Japan) Yuji Unozawa | Nagano Parceiro | 15 |
| 6 | (Japan) Shoma Mizunaga | V-Varen Nagasaki | 14 |
| 6 | (Japan) Shunta Takahashi | FC Ryukyu | 14 |
| 6 | (Japan) Masaru Takeuchi | Tochigi Uva | 14 |
| 9 | (Serbia) Dragan Dimić | Machida Zelvia | 13 |
| 10 | (Japan) Shohei Kiyohara | Sagawa Shiga | 12 |

== Attendance ==
| Pos | Team | Total | High | Low | Average | Change |
|---|---|---|---|---|---|---|
| 1 | Matsumoto Yamaga | 126,830 | 11,956 | 4,032 | 7,461 | +46.9% |
| 2 | Machida Zelvia | 59,757 | 8,113 | 1,326 | 3,515 | +0.3% |
| 3 | Kamatamare Sanuki | 48,393 | 11,178 | 1,065 | 3,025 | +67.0%^{†} |
| 4 | Zweigen Kanazawa | 40,070 | 11,234 | 446 | 2,504 | +61.8% |
| 5 | Nagano Parceiro | 36,494 | 3,849 | 1,030 | 2,281 | +41.9%^{†} |
| 6 | FC Ryukyu | 31,620 | 3,017 | 363 | 1,860 | +4.7% |
| 7 | V-Varen Nagasaki | 25,717 | 3,187 | 625 | 1,513 | −40.1% |
| 8 | Blaublitz Akita | 21,666 | 3,624 | 793 | 1,274 | +1.4% |
| 9 | Sagawa Shiga | 19,576 | 3,450 | 115 | 1,152 | −2.6% |
| 10 | Honda FC | 15,107 | 2,481 | 172 | 889 | +14.0% |
| 11 | Yokogawa Musashino | 12,179 | 1,648 | 229 | 716 | −7.7% |
| 12 | Sony Sendai | 8,155 | 1,282 | 440 | 680 | −10.5% |
| 13 | Honda Lock | 10,838 | 1,552 | 440 | 677 | +26.1% |
| 14 | MIO Biwako Kusatsu | 10,724 | 1,263 | 189 | 670 | −15.5% |
| 15 | Tochigi Uva | 9,032 | 1,436 | 295 | 531 | −29.2% |
| 16 | Arte Takasaki | 7,775 | 1,727 | 212 | 457 | +6.3% |
| 17 | SP Kyoto | 6,516 | 1,162 | 91 | 383 | −4.7% |
| 18 | JEF Reserves | 5,757 | 782 | 171 | 360 | +11.1% |
| | League total | 496,206 | 11,956 | 91 | 1,682 | +14.9% |

Updated to games played on 11 December 2011
Source: Japan Football League: First round, second round
Notes:
^{†} Team played previous season in Regional Leagues.
