= Hiroki Mizuhara =

Japanese footballer

Hiroki Mizuhara 水原 大樹
Personal information
- Full name: Hiroki Mizuhara
- Date of birth: January 15, 1975 (age 51)
- Place of birth: Heguri, Nara, Japan
- Height: 1.82 m (5 ft 11 1/2 in)
- Position: Goalkeeper

Youth career
- 1990–1992: Yokkaichi Chuo Technical High School

Senior career*
Years	Team	Apps	(Gls)
1993–1998	Nagoya Grampus Eight	1	(0)
1999	Honda	17	(0)
2000–2003	Yokohama FC	118	(0)
2004–2006	Tokyo Verdy	9	(0)
2007–2011	Giravanz Kitakyushu	121	(0)
2012	Kamatamare Sanuki	7	(0)
2013	Veertien Kuwana		
Total		273	(0)
Medal record
Nagoya Grampus Eight
Runner-up	J1 League	1996
Winner	Emperor's Cup	1995
Tokyo Verdy
Winner	Emperor's Cup	2004
- * Club domestic league appearances and goals

Hiroki Mizuhara (水原 大樹, Mizuhara Hiroki; born January 15, 1975) is a former Japanese football player.

== Playing career ==
Mizuhara was born in Heguri, Nara on January 15, 1975. After graduating from high school, he joined Nagoya Grampus Eight in 1993. On March 25, 1995, he debuted as substitutes against Júbilo Iwata. However he could only play this match behind Yuji Ito until 1998. In 1999, he moved to Japan Football League (JFL) club Honda and played many matches. In 2000, he moved to JFL club Yokohama FC. He played as regular goalkeeper. The club won the champions in 2000 and was promoted to J2 League from 2001. In 2004, he moved to J1 League club Tokyo Verdy. On May 14, 2005, he played against Kashiwa Reysol in J1 League instead Yoshinari Takagi who was suspended. This match was his match in J1 for the first time in 10 years. However he could hardly play in the match behind Takagi in 3 seasons until 2006. In 2007, he moved to Regional Leagues club New Wave Kitakyushu (later Giravanz Kitakyushu). He played as regular goalkeeper and the club was promoted to JFL in 2008 and J2 in 2010. However he lost position in 2011 behind Yuya Sato who came the club in 2011. In 2012, Mizuhara moved to JFL club Kamatamare Sanuki. In February, he announced his retirement. However he joined Prefectural Leagues club Veertien Kuwana in May 2013 and he played for the club in 1 season.

== Career statistics ==
Appearances and goals by club, season and competition
Club	Season	League			Emperor's Cup		J.League Cup		Asia		Total	
Club	Season	Division	Apps	Goals	Apps	Goals	Apps	Goals	Apps	Goals	Apps	Goals
Nagoya Grampus Eight	1993	J1 League	0	0	0	0	0	0	—		0	0
Nagoya Grampus Eight	1994	J1 League	0	0	0	0	0	0	—		0	0
Nagoya Grampus Eight	1995	J1 League	1	0	0	0	—		—		1	0
Nagoya Grampus Eight	1996	J1 League	0	0	0	0	0	0	—		0	0
Nagoya Grampus Eight	1997	J1 League	0	0	0	0	0	0	—		0	0
Nagoya Grampus Eight	1998	J1 League	0	0	0	0	0	0	—		0	0
Honda	1999	Football League	17	0	2	0	—		—		19	0
Yokohama FC	2000	Football League	18	0	2	0	—		—		20	0
Yokohama FC	2001	J2 League	42	0	4	0	3	0	—		49	0
Yokohama FC	2002	J2 League	39	0	2	0	—		—		41	0
Yokohama FC	2003	J2 League	19	0	1	0	—		—		20	0
Tokyo Verdy	2004	J1 League	0	0	0	0	1	0	—		1	0
Tokyo Verdy	2005	J1 League	1	0	0	0	0	0	—		1	0
Tokyo Verdy	2006	J2 League	8	0	1	0	—		1	0	10	0
New Wave Kitakyushu	2007	Regional Leagues	20	0	—		—		—		20	0
New Wave Kitakyushu	2008	Football League	34	0	3	0	—		—		37	0
New Wave Kitakyushu	2009	Football League	34	0	1	0	—		—		35	0
Giravanz Kitakyushu	2010	J2 League	33	0	2	0	—		—		35	0
Giravanz Kitakyushu	2011	J2 League	0	0	0	0	—		—		0	0
Kamatamare Sanuki	2012	Football League	7	0	1	0	—		—		8	0
Career total			273	0	19	0	4	0	1	0	297	0
