= 2001 J.League Cup =

J.League Yamazaki Nabisco Cup

Tournament details
- Country: Japan
- Dates: 4 April – 27 October 2001
- Teams: 28

Final positions
- Champions: Yokohama F. Marinos (1st title)
- Runners-up: Júbilo Iwata
- Semifinalists: Kashima Antlers; Nagoya Grampus Eight

Tournament statistics
- Matches played: 53
- Goals scored: 130 (2.45 per match)
- Attendance: 310,277 (5,854 per match)
- Top goal scorer(s): Tuto; Shoji Jo; Masashi Nakayama; Masanobu Matsunami; Tatsuhiko Kubo; Wagner Lopes (4 goals each)

Awards
- MVP Award: Tatsuya Enomoto

Statistics of J. League Cup, officially the 2001 J.League Yamazaki Nabisco Cup, in the 2001 season.

== Overview ==
It was contested by 28 teams, and Yokohama F. Marinos won the cup.

== Results ==
=== First round ===
The first legs were played on 4 April, and the second legs were played on 18 April. 12 teams from the Division 1 and all 12 teams from the Division 2 entered this round.

Team 1	Agg.	Team 2	1st leg	2nd leg
Shonan Bellmare	0–1	Kashiwa Reysol	0–1	0–0
Montedio Yamagata	2–3	Urawa Red Diamonds	2–0	0–3
Kyoto Purple Sanga	0–4	Gamba Osaka	0–2	0–2
Omiya Ardija	1–2	JEF United Ichihara	1–1	0–1
Oita Trinita	3–2	Consadole Sapporo	2–0	1–2
Júbilo Iwata	4–3	Cerezo Osaka	2–2	2–1
Yokohama FC	3–1	Tokyo Verdy	1–1	2–0
Mito HollyHock	1–4	Yokohama F. Marinos	0–1	1–3
Vegalta Sendai	3–4	Avispa Fukuoka	1–2	2–2
Sagan Tosu	1–7	Vissel Kobe	1–3	0–4
FC Tokyo	6–0	Ventforet Kofu	5–0	1–0
Albirex Niigata	0–4	Sanfrecce Hiroshima	0–2	0–2

1st Leg

4 April 2001	Shonan Bellmare	0–1	Kashiwa Reysol	Hiratsuka
19:00		Report	Kato 8'	Stadium: Hiratsuka Stadium; Attendance: 3,036; Referee: Shamsul Maidin (Singapore)

4 April 2001	Montedio Yamagata	2–0	Urawa Red Diamonds	Tendō
19:04	Y. Sato 33'; Horii 43'	Report		Stadium: Yamagata Park Stadium; Attendance: 3,771; Referee: Toshimitsu Yoshida

4 April 2001	Kyoto Purple Sanga	0–2	Gamba Osaka	Kyoto
19:00		Report	Matsunami 8', 40'	Stadium: Nishikyogoku Athletic Stadium; Attendance: 3,405; Referee: Yoshitsugu Katayama

4 April 2001	Omiya Ardija	1–1	JEF United Ichihara	Ōmiya-ku
19:01	Jorginho 69'	Report	H. Satō 84'	Stadium: Omiya Football Stadium; Attendance: 2,343; Referee: Masayoshi Okada

4 April 2001	Oita Trinita	2–0	Consadole Sapporo	Ōita
19:00	Yoshida 13'; K. Sato 49'	Report		Stadium: Oita Athletic Stadium; Attendance: 4,419; Referee: Hirofumi Yamanishi

4 April 2001	Júbilo Iwata	2–2	Cerezo Osaka	Iwata
19:00	Takahara 77', 80'	Report	Ōkubo 6'; Manaka 89'	Stadium: Júbilo Iwata Stadium; Attendance: 6,536; Referee: Kazuhisa Osada

4 April 2001	Yokohama FC	1–1	Tokyo Verdy	Yokohama
19:05	Morita 39'	Report	Iio 58'	Stadium: Mitsuzawa Football Stadium; Attendance: 2,935; Referee: Yasuhiro Matsuzaki

4 April 2001	Mito HollyHock	0–1	Yokohama F. Marinos	Utsunomiya
19:00		Report	Jo 85'	Stadium: Tochigi Green Stadium; Attendance: 6,211; Referee: Kazuhiko Matsumura

4 April 2001	Vegalta Sendai	1–2	Avispa Fukuoka	Sendai
19:00	Ōtomo 69'	Report	Yamashita 61'; Villalonga 65'	Stadium: Sendai Stadium; Attendance: 5,422; Referee: Yasuhiro Hemmi

4 April 2001	Sagan Tosu	1–3	Vissel Kobe	Tosu
19:01	Fukudome 12'	Report	Nunobe 61'; Tsuchiya 79'; Miura 89'	Stadium: Tosu Stadium; Attendance: 3,632; Referee: Hideaki Harada

4 April 2001	FC Tokyo	5–0	Ventforet Kofu	Tokyo
19:03	Lopes 53', 69', 89'; Kagami 58'; Miura 73'	Report		Stadium: Tokyo Stadium; Attendance: 5,885; Referee: Tetsuya Hamana

4 April 2001	Albirex Niigata	0–2	Sanfrecce Hiroshima	Niigata
19:01		Report	Fujimoto 44'; Hattori 81'	Stadium: Niigata Athletic Stadium; Attendance: 2,261; Referee: Toru Kamikawa

2nd Leg

18 April 2001	Kashiwa Reysol	0–0 (1–0 agg.)	Shonan Bellmare	Kashiwa
		Report		Stadium: Hitachi Stadium; Attendance: 5,163; Referee: Takao Onshi

18 April 2001	Urawa Red Diamonds	3–0 (3–2 agg.)	Montedio Yamagata	Urawa-ku
	Tuto 15', 86'; Donizete 70'	Report		Stadium: Urawa Komaba Stadium; Attendance: 9,919; Referee: Joji Kashihara

18 April 2001	Gamba Osaka	2–0 (4–0 agg.)	Kyoto Purple Sanga	Osaka
	Matsunami 40'; Vital 68'	Report		Stadium: Expo '70 Commemorative Stadium; Attendance: 2,638; Referee: Hiroyuki Umemoto

18 April 2001	JEF United Ichihara	1–0 (2–1 agg.)	Omiya Ardija	Ichihara
	Milinovič 56'	Report		Stadium: Ichihara Stadium; Attendance: 1,914; Referee: Leslie Mottram (Scotland)

18 April 2001	Consadole Sapporo	2–1 (2–3 agg.)	Oita Trinita	Muroran
	Will 15', 43'	Report	K. Sato 33'	Stadium: Muroran Irie Stadium; Attendance: 2,439; Referee: Toru Kamikawa

18 April 2001	Cerezo Osaka	1–2 (3–4 agg.)	Júbilo Iwata	Osaka
	Manaka 89'	Report	Zivkovic 87'; Nakayama 89'	Stadium: Nagai Stadium; Attendance: 7,136; Referee: Toshimitsu Yoshida

18 April 2001	Tokyo Verdy	0–2 (1–3 agg.)	Yokohama FC	Tokyo
		Report	Yokoyama 36'; Sato 76'	Stadium: Tokyo Stadium; Attendance: 2,960; Referee: Akio Okutani

18 April 2001	Yokohama F. Marinos	3–1 (4–1 agg.)	Mito HollyHock	Yokohama
	Hato 1'; Nakamura 68'; Jo 89'	Report	Kawamura 85'	Stadium: Mitsuzawa Football Stadium; Attendance: 5,078; Referee: Noboru Ishiyama

18 April 2001	Avispa Fukuoka	2–2 (4–3 agg.)	Vegalta Sendai	Fukuoka
	Villalonga 57'; Miyoshi 89'	Report	Iwamoto 25'; Hasumi 74'	Stadium: Hakatanomori Football Stadium; Attendance: 4,617; Referee: Shamsul Maidin (Singapore)

18 April 2001	Vissel Kobe	4–0 (7–1 agg.)	Sagan Tosu	Kobe
	Nunobe 69'; Sidic Lei 75'; Miura 84'; Mori 89'	Report		Stadium: Kobe Universiade Memorial Stadium; Attendance: 2,190; Referee: Hiroyushi Onishi

18 April 2001	Ventforet Kofu	0–1 (0–6 agg.)	FC Tokyo	Kōfu
		Report	Lopes 59'	Stadium: Kose Sports Park Stadium; Attendance: 1,700; Referee: Masayoshi Okada

18 April 2001	Sanfrecce Hiroshima	2–0 (4–0 agg.)	Albirex Niigata	Hiroshima
	Takahashi 11'; Kubo 26'	Report		Stadium: Hiroshima Stadium; Attendance: 2,859; Referee: Kazuhiko Matsumura

=== Second round ===
The first legs were played on 13 June, and the second legs were played on 20 June. The 4 remaining teams from the Division 1 entered this round.

Team 1	Agg.	Team 2	1st leg	2nd leg
Kashiwa Reysol	3–5	Kashima Antlers	3–1	0–4
Gamba Osaka	3–6	Urawa Red Diamonds	1–3	2–3
JEF United Ichihara	2–2 (5–4 p)	Shimizu S-Pulse	1–0	1–2 (a.e.t.)
Júbilo Iwata	2–1	Oita Trinita	1–0	1–1
Yokohama FC	1–3	Kawasaki Frontale	0–1	1–2
Avispa Fukuoka	0–5	Yokohama F. Marinos	0–3	0–2
Vissel Kobe	3–4	Nagoya Grampus Eight	2–2	1–2
Sanfrecce Hiroshima	5–4	FC Tokyo	3–3	2–1 (a.e.t.)

1st Leg

13 June 2001	Kashiwa Reysol	3–1	Kashima Antlers	Kashiwa
19:02	Watanabe 20'; Kato 35'; Kitajima 86'	Report	Yanagisawa 73'	Stadium: Kashiwanoha Stadium; Attendance: 7,395; Referee: Kazuhisa Osada

13 June 2001	Gamba Osaka	1–3	Urawa Red Diamonds	Osaka
19:01	Futagawa 61'	Report	Ono 44', 83'; Tuto 64'	Stadium: Expo '70 Commemorative Stadium; Attendance: 4,147; Referee: Masayoshi Okada

13 June 2001	JEF United Ichihara	1–0	Shimizu S-Pulse	Ichihara
19:00	unknown 32' (o.g.)	Report		Stadium: Ichihara Stadium; Attendance: 2,219; Referee: Tetsu Karakida

13 June 2001	Júbilo Iwata	1–0	Oita Trinita	Iwata
19:00	Shimizu 17'	Report		Stadium: Júbilo Iwata Stadium; Attendance: 6,770; Referee: Hiroyuki Umemoto

13 June 2001	Yokohama FC	0–1	Kawasaki Frontale	Yokohama
19:00		Report	Ganaha 54'	Stadium: Mitsuzawa Football Stadium; Attendance: 2,086; Referee: Noboru Ishiyama

13 June 2001	Avispa Fukuoka	0–3	Yokohama F. Marinos	Fukuoka
19:00		Report	Kazuma 7'; Jo 38', 42'	Stadium: Hakatanomori Football Stadium; Attendance: 4,580; Referee: Kazuhiro Matsumura

13 June 2001	Vissel Kobe	2–2	Nagoya Grampus Eight	Kobe
19:05	Yabuta 42'; Watada 62'	Report	Ueslei 36'; Hiraoka 51'	Stadium: Kobe Universiade Memorial Stadium; Attendance: 4,739; Referee: Joji Kashihara

13 June 2001	Sanfrecce Hiroshima	3–3	FC Tokyo	Hiroshima
19:00	Kubo 40', 62', 63'	Report	Kobayashi 23', 65'; Kelly 89'	Stadium: Hiroshima Stadium; Attendance: 2,440; Referee: Yasuhiro Matsuzaki

2nd Leg

20 June 2001	Kashima Antlers	4–0 (5–3 agg.)	Kashiwa Reysol	Kashima
19:04	unknown 39' (o.g.); Hirase 57'; Suzuki 69'; Yanagisawa 82'	Report		Stadium: Kashima Soccer Stadium; Attendance: 7,848; Referee: Toshimitsu Yoshida

20 June 2001	Urawa Red Diamonds	3–2 (6–3 agg.)	Gamba Osaka	Saitama
19:05	Tuto 28'; Nagai 60'; Shinji Ono 80'	Report	Vital 66'; Matsunami 77'	Stadium: Urawa Komaba Stadium; Attendance: 9,285; Referee: Dick Jol (Netherlands)

20 June 2001	Shimizu S-Pulse	2–1 (a.e.t.) (2–2 agg.) (4–5 p)	JEF United Ichihara	Shizuoka
19:00	Sawanobori 17'; Alex 19'	Report	Oshiba 3'	Stadium: Kusanagi Athletic Stadium; Attendance: 8,039; Referee: Takao Onshi
	Penalties
	Alex (penalty scored); Ito (penalty scored); Hiramatsu (penalty missed); Baron (penalty scored); Morioka (penalty scored)		(penalty scored) Choi Yong-soo; (penalty scored) Muto; (penalty scored) Mujčin; (penalty scored) Ibata; (penalty scored) Nakanishi

20 June 2001	Oita Trinita	1–1 (1–2 agg.)	Júbilo Iwata	Kumamoto
19:02	Takamatsu 9'	Report	Nakayama 66'	Stadium: Kumamoto Athletics Stadium; Attendance: 9,741; Referee: Hideaki Harada

20 June 2001	Kawasaki Frontale	2–1 (3–1 agg.)	Yokohama FC	Kawasaki
19:00	Emerson Sheik 28'; Watanabe 51'	Report	Shingi Ono 60'	Stadium: Kawasaki Todoroki Stadium; Attendance: 3,756; Referee: Hiroyuki Onishi

20 June 2001	Yokohama F. Marinos	2–0 (5–0 agg.)	Avispa Fukuoka	Yokohama
19:01	Hirama 1', 29'	Report		Stadium: Mitsuzawa Football Stadium; Attendance: 6,256; Referee: Tetsu Karakida

20 June 2001	Nagoya Grampus Eight	2–1 (4–3 agg.)	Vissel Kobe	Nagoya
19:00	Oulida 15'; Ueslei 52'	Report	Conceicao 28'	Stadium: Mizuho Athletics Stadium; Attendance: 6,476; Referee: Akio Okutani

20 June 2001	FC Tokyo	1–2 (a.e.t.) (4–5 agg.)	Sanfrecce Hiroshima	Tokyo
19:04	Kelly 44'	Report	Takahashi 71'; Oki 110'	Stadium: Tokyo Stadium; Attendance: 5,956; Referee: Kazuhisa Osada

=== Quarterfinals ===
The first legs were played on 8 August, and the second legs were played from 22 to 29 August.

Team 1	Agg.	Team 2	1st leg	2nd leg
Sanfrecce Hiroshima	2–4	Nagoya Grampus Eight	2–3	0–1
Júbilo Iwata	4–2	JEF United Ichihara	2–2	2–0
Urawa Red Diamonds	1–2	Kashima Antlers	1–0	0–2 (a.e.t.)
Yokohama F. Marinos	5–0	Kawasaki Frontale	3–0	2–0

1st Leg

8 August 2001	Sanfrecce Hiroshima	2–3	Nagoya Grampus Eight	Hiroshima
19:01	Oki 21', 38'	Report	Nakamura 27', 39'; Okayama 49'	Stadium: West Hiroshima Stadium; Attendance: 4,080; Referee: Leslie Mottram (Scotland)

8 August 2001	Júbilo Iwata	2–2	JEF United Ichihara	Kagoshima
19:06	Nakayama 36', 80'	Report	Choi Yong-soo 68', 76'	Stadium: Kagoshima Kamoike Stadium; Attendance: 11,038; Referee: Dick Jol (Netherlands)

8 August 2001	Urawa Red Diamonds	1–0	Kashima Antlers	Saitama
19:05	Adriano 89'	Report		Stadium: Urawa Komaba Stadium; Attendance: 12,062; Referee: Masayoshi Okada

8 August 2001	Yokohama F. Marinos	3–0	Kawasaki Frontale	Yokohama
19:00	Ueno 15'; Endō 43', 67'	Report		Stadium: Mitsuzawa Football Stadium; Attendance: 7,249; Referee: Joji Kashihara

2nd Leg

22 August 2001	Nagoya Grampus Eight	1–0 (4–2 agg.)	Sanfrecce Hiroshima	Nagoya
19:00	Ueslei 62'	Report		Stadium: Mizuho Athletics Stadium; Attendance: 7,521; Referee: Shinichiro Obata

28 August 2001	JEF United Ichihara	0–2 (2–4 agg.)	Júbilo Iwata	Ichihara
19:00		Report	Kawaguchi 80'; Maeda 85'	Stadium: Ichihara Stadium; Attendance: 4,809; Referee: Tetsuya Hamana

29 August 2001	Kashima Antlers	2–0 (a.e.t.) (2–1 agg.)	Urawa Red Diamonds	Kashima
19:04	Akita 47'; Hasegawa 92'	Report		Stadium: Kashima Soccer Stadium; Attendance: 11,472; Referee: Yasuhiro Matsuzaki

29 August 2001	Kawasaki Frontale	0–2 (0–5 agg.)	Yokohama F. Marinos	Kawasaki
19:05		Report	Brito 6', 50'	Stadium: Kawasaki Todoroki Stadium; Attendance: 6,115; Referee: Takao Onshi

=== Semifinals ===
The first legs were played on 26 September, and the second legs were played on 10 October.

Team 1	Agg.	Team 2	1st leg	2nd leg
Júbilo Iwata	1–0	Kashima Antlers	1–0	0–0
Nagoya Grampus Eight	0–1	Yokohama F. Marinos	0–1	0–0

1st Leg

26 September 2001	Júbilo Iwata	1–0	Kashima Antlers	Iwata
19:05	Shimizu 54'	Report		Stadium: Júbilo Iwata Stadium; Attendance: 8,547; Referee: Wolfgang Stark (Germany)

26 September 2001	Nagoya Grampus Eight	0–1	Yokohama F. Marinos	Nagoya
19:05		Report	Nakamura 61'	Stadium: Mizuho Athletics Stadium; Attendance: 4,754; Referee: Toru Kamikawa

2nd Leg

10 October 2001	Kashima Antlers	0–0 (0–1 agg.)	Júbilo Iwata	Kashima
19:04		Report		Stadium: Kashima Soccer Stadium; Attendance: 7,367; Referee: Toru Kamikawa

10 October 2001	Yokohama F. Marinos	0–0 (1–0 agg.)	Nagoya Grampus Eight	Yokohama
19:05		Report		Stadium: Mitsuzawa Football Stadium; Attendance: 4,042; Referee: Lim Kee Chong (Mauritius)

=== Final ===
27 October 2001
14:00

Júbilo Iwata	0–0 (a.e.t.)	Yokohama F. Marinos
	Report
Penalties
Fujita (penalty missed); Nakayama (penalty scored); Živković (penalty missed); Maeda (penalty missed)	1–3	(penalty scored) Nakamura; (penalty scored) Sakata; (penalty missed) Hato; (penalty missed) Dutra; (penalty scored) Omura

National Stadium, Tokyo
Attendance: 31,019
Referee: Leslie Mottram (Scotland)

Yokohama F. Marinos won the cup.
