= Narita Takaki =

Japanese footballer and manager

Narita Takaki 高木 成太
Personal information
- Full name: Narita Takaki
- Date of birth: April 5, 1977 (age 49)
- Place of birth: Nagasaki, Japan
- Height: 1.74 m (5 ft 8 1/2 in)
- Position: Midfielder

Youth career
- 1993–1995: Kunimi High School

Senior career*
Years	Team	Apps	(Gls)
1996–1997	Blaze Kumamoto		
1998	Verdy Kawasaki	0	(0)
1999–2003	Yokohama FC	102	(8)
2002	→Tokyo Verdy (loan)	14	(0)
2005	FC Horikoshi	19	(1)
2006	FC Gifu	6	(0)
2006–2007	MIE Rampole	0	(0)
Total		141	(9)

Managerial career
- 2011–2014: FC Suzuka Rampole
- * Club domestic league appearances and goals

Narita Takaki (高木 成太, Takaki Narita; born April 5, 1977) is a former Japanese football player and manager.

== Playing career ==
Takaki was born in Nagasaki Prefecture on April 5, 1977. After graduating from high school, he joined Regional Leagues club Blaze Kumamoto in 1996. In 1998, he moved to J1 League club Verdy Kawasaki (later Tokyo Verdy). However he could not play at all in the match. In 1999, he moved to new club Yokohama FC in Japan Football League (JFL). He played many matches as defensive midfielder and the club won the champions for 2 years in a row (1999-2000) and was promoted to J2 League from 2001. In 2002, he moved to Tokyo Verdy again. In 2003, he returned to Yokohama FC and left the club end of 2003 season. After 1 year blank, he joined JFL club FC Horikoshi. In 2006, he moved to Regional Leagues club FC Gifu. In December 2006, he moved to Prefectural Leagues club MIE Rampole. He retired in January 2007.

== Coaching career ==
In 2011, Takaki became a manager for Regional Leagues club FC Suzuka Rampole. He managed the club until 2014.

== Club statistics ==
Club performance			League		Cup		League Cup		Total	
Season	Club	League	Apps	Goals	Apps	Goals	Apps	Goals	Apps	Goals
Japan			League		Emperor's Cup		J.League Cup		Total	
1996	Blaze Kumamoto	Regional Leagues								
1997	Blaze Kumamoto	Regional Leagues								
1998	Verdy Kawasaki	J1 League	0	0	0	0	0	0	0	0
1999	Yokohama FC	Football League	17	0	1	0	-		18	0
2000	Yokohama FC	Football League	20	5	1	0	-		21	5
2001	Yokohama FC	J2 League	42	2	4	2	4	0	50	4
2002	Tokyo Verdy	J1 League	14	0	1	0	6	1	21	1
2003	Yokohama FC	J2 League	23	1	0	0	-		23	1
2005	FC Horikoshi	Football League	19	1	3	0	-		22	1
2006	FC Gifu	Regional Leagues	6	0	0	0	-		6	0
2006	MIE Rampole	Prefectural Leagues	0	0	-		-		0	0
Total			141	9	10	2	10	1	161	12
