= Kosaku Masuda =

Japanese manager

Kosaku Masuda 増田 功作
Personal information
- Full name: Kosaku Masuda
- Date of birth: April 30, 1976 (age 50)
- Place of birth: Saitama, Japan
- Height: 1.74 m (5 ft 8 1/2 in)
- Position: Midfielder

Youth career
- 1992–1994: Omiya Higashi High School

Senior career*
Years	Team	Apps	(Gls)
199?	Oriente Petrolero	?	(?)
199?	Sãocarlense	?	(?)
1998	Verdy Kawasaki	3	(0)
1999–2004	Yokohama FC	121	(15)
2005	Sun Miyazaki		
2005	FC Machida Zelvia	0	(0)
Total		124	(15)

Managerial career
- 2024–2025: Tokushima Vortis
- * Club domestic league appearances and goals

Kosaku Masuda (増田 功作, Masuda Kōsaku; born April 30, 1976) is a Japanese football manager and former player who is the manager of J2 League club Tokushima Vortis.

== Playing career ==
Masuda was born in Saitama Prefecture on April 30, 1976. After graduating from high school, he played for Bolivian club Oriente Petrolero and Brazilian club Sãocarlense. In 1998, he returned to Japan and joined J1 League club Verdy Kawasaki. However, he could hardly play in the match. In 1999, he moved to new club Yokohama FC in Japan Football League. He played mainly as an offensive midfielder. The club won the JFL championships in 1999 and 2000 and was promoted to J2 League. He played for the club until 2004. In 2005, he played for two non-league teams in the Regional Leagues and Prefectural Leagues, Sun Miyazaki and Machida Zelvia. He retired end of 2005 season.

== Career statistics ==
Appearances and goals by club, season and competition
Club	Season	League			Emperor's Cup		J.League Cup		Total	
Club	Season	Division	Apps	Goals	Apps	Goals	Apps	Goals	Apps	Goals
Verdy Kawasaki	1998	J1 League	3	0			3	1	6	1
Yokohama FC	1999	Football League	19	2	—		—		19	2
Yokohama FC	2000	Football League	20	9	2	0	—		22	9
Yokohama FC	2001	J2 League	29	3	4	2	3	0	36	5
Yokohama FC	2002	J2 League	23	1	1	0	—		24	1
Yokohama FC	2003	J2 League	16	0	3	1	—		19	1
Yokohama FC	2004	J2 League	14	0			—		14	0
Career total			124	15	10	3	6	1	140	19
