= Takafumi Yoshimoto =

Japanese footballer

Takafumi Yoshimoto 吉本 岳史
Personal information
- Full name: Takafumi Yoshimoto
- Date of birth: 13 May 1978 (age 48)
- Place of birth: Kochi, Japan
- Height: 1.80 m (5 ft 11 in)
- Position: Defender

Team information
- Current team: Tokushima Vortis (manager)

Youth career
- 1994–1996: Minamiuwa High School
- 1997–2000: Fukuoka University

Senior career*
Years	Team	Apps	(Gls)
2001–2002	Nagoya Grampus Eight	1	(0)
2002	Yokohama FC	14	(1)
2003–2007	Mito HollyHock	138	(17)
2008–2009	Yokohama FC	42	(0)
2012–2017	Blancdieu Hirosaki		
Total		195	(18)

Managerial career
- 2012–2017: Blancdieu Hirosaki
- 2020–2022: Kochi United (assistant)
- 2022–2024: Kochi United
- 2026: Kochi United
- 2026-: Tokushima Vortis
- * Club domestic league appearances and goals

Takafumi Yoshimoto (吉本 岳史, Yoshimoto Takafumi; born May 13, 1978) is a Japanese football manager and former player who play as a Defender. He currently manager of Tokushima Vortis.

== Playing career ==
Yoshimoto was born in Kochi Prefecture on May 13, 1978. After graduating from Fukuoka University, he joined J1 League club Nagoya Grampus Eight in 2001. On November 17, he debuted as substitute center back from the 89th minute against JEF United Ichihara. However he could only play this match at the club. In June 2002, he moved to J2 League club Yokohama FC. He played many matches as center back with Shinya Sakoi. In 2003, he moved to J2 club Mito HollyHock. He became a regular player as center back and played many matches until 2007. In 2008, he moved to J2 club Yokohama FC again. Although he played many matches, he could not become a regular player and retired end of 2009 season. In 2012, he signed with Prefectural Leagues club Blancdieu Hirosaki FC and became a player manager. He played many matches as regular player and the club was promoted to Regional Leagues from 2013. He retired at the end of the 2017 season.

== Managerial career ==
In 2012, Yoshimoto signed with Prefectural Leagues club Blancdieu Hirosaki FC and became a player manager. The club was promoted to Regional Leagues from 2013. He managed the club until end of 2017 season.

In 2020, he was assistant manager of his hometown club, Kochi United SC. In 2022, he was promoted from assistant manager to manager of his hometown club Kochi United SC. On 7 December 2024, Yoshimoto led his club to promotion to J3 League for the first time in their history after defeating YSCC Yokohama 0-2 in the second leg of the J3/JFL play-offs winning 1-3 on aggregate. Yoshimoto left from the club in 2024 after his contract ended, but returned for a second spell starting from the 2026 season.

== Club statistics ==
Club performance			League		Cup		League Cup		Total	
Season	Club	League	Apps	Goals	Apps	Goals	Apps	Goals	Apps	Goals
Japan			League		Emperor's Cup		J.League Cup		Total	
2001	Nagoya Grampus Eight	J. League Div 1	1	0	0	0	0	0	1	0
2002	Nagoya Grampus Eight	J. League Div 1	0	0	0	0	0	0	0	0
2002	Yokohama FC	J. League Div 2	14	1	2	1	-		16	1
2003	Mito HollyHock	J. League Div 2	31	0	3	0	-		34	0
2004	Mito HollyHock	J. League Div 2	15	2	0	0	-		15	2
2005	Mito HollyHock	J. League Div 2	30	6	1	0	-		31	6
2006	Mito HollyHock	J. League Div 2	32	5	0	0	-		32	5
2007	Mito HollyHock	J. League Div 2	30	4	2	0	-		32	4
2008	Yokohama FC	J. League Div 2	19	0	2	0	-		21	0
2009	Yokohama FC	J. League Div 2	23	0	1	0	-		24	0
2012	Blancdieu Hirosaki	Prefectural Leagues			-		-			
2013	Blancdieu Hirosaki	Regional Leagues	18	2	-		-		18	2
2014	Blancdieu Hirosaki	Regional Leagues	16	5	-		-		16	5
2015	Blancdieu Hirosaki	Regional Leagues	16	2	-		-		16	2
2016	Blancdieu Hirosaki	Regional Leagues	15	1	-		-		15	1
2017	Blancdieu Hirosaki	Regional Leagues	17	1	-		-		17	1
Total			277	29	11	1	0	0	288	30

== Managerial statistics ==
As of the start for 2026–27 season.

Managerial record by club and tenure
Team	From	To	Record				
Team	From	To	G	W	D	L	Win %
Blancdieu Hirosaki	2012	2017	97	59	14	24	60.82
Kochi United	2022	2024	98	41	23	34	41.84
Kochi United	2026	Present	0	0	0	0	—
Total			195	100	37	58	51.28

== Honours ==
=== Manager ===
Blancdieu Hirosaki

- Aomori Prefecture 1st Division : 2012
- Tohoku Soccer League Div. 2 : 2014

Kochi United SC

- J3/JFL Play-off winner: 2024
