= Yukinori Shigeta =

Japanese footballer

Yukinori Shigeta 重田 征紀
Personal information
- Full name: Yukinori Shigeta
- Date of birth: July 15, 1976 (age 50)
- Place of birth: Isehara, Kanagawa, Japan
- Height: 1.65 m (5 ft 5 in)
- Position: Defender

Youth career
- 1992–1994: Verdy Kawasaki

Senior career*
Years	Team	Apps	(Gls)
1995–1998	Verdy Kawasaki	5	(0)
1999–2005	Yokohama FC	132	(2)
Total		137	(2)
Medal record
Verdy Kawasaki
Runner-up	J1 League	1995
Runner-up	J.League Cup	1996
Winner	Emperor's Cup	1996
- * Club domestic league appearances and goals

Yukinori Shigeta (重田 征紀, Shigeta Yukinori; born July 15, 1976) is a former Japanese football player.

== Playing career ==
Shigeta was born in Isehara on July 15, 1976. He joined Verdy Kawasaki from youth team in 1995. He played several matches as right side back from 1997. In 1999, he moved to new club Yokohama FC in Japan Football League. he played many matches and the club won the champions for 2 years in a row (1999-2000). The club was promoted to J2 League from 2001 and he became a regular player. However his opportunity to play decreased from 2004 and retired at the end of the 2005 season.

== Coaching and management career ==
After retiring as a player, Shigeta stayed with Yokohama FC as the director for their U-15 youth program

He also coached the Yokohama FC senior team.

== Career statistics ==
Appearances and goals by club, season and competition
Club	Season	League			Emperor's Cup		J.League Cup		Total	
Club	Season	Division	Apps	Goals	Apps	Goals	Apps	Goals	Apps	Goals
Verdy Kawasaki	1995	J1 League	0	0	0	0	—		0	0
Verdy Kawasaki	1996	J1 League	0	0	0	0	0	0	0	0
Verdy Kawasaki	1997	J1 League	3	0	0	0	0	0	3	0
Verdy Kawasaki	1998	J1 League	2	0	0	0	0	0	2	0
Yokohama FC	1999	Football League	16	0	3	0	—		19	0
Yokohama FC	2000	Football League	11	0	2	0	—		13	0
Yokohama FC	2001	J2 League	38	0	0	0	3	0	41	0
Yokohama FC	2002	J2 League	26	2	0	0	—		26	2
Yokohama FC	2003	J2 League	30	0	3	0	—		33	0
Yokohama FC	2004	J2 League	1	0	1	0	—		2	0
Yokohama FC	2005	J2 League	10	0	0	0	—		10	0
Career total			137	2	9	0	3	0	149	2
