= Tamotsu =

- Gender: Male

Origin
- Origin: Japanese
- Meaning: Different meanings depending on the kanji used

Tamotsu (written: 保) is a masculine Japanese given name. Notable people with the name include:

- Tamotsu Asakura, Japanese footballer
- Tamotsu Chikanari (近成 保) (born 1929), Japanese cyclist
- Tamotsu Komatsuzaki (小松崎 保) (born 1970), Japanese footballer
- Tamotsu Oishi (大石 保) (1900–1946), Imperial Japanese Navy admiral
- Tamotsu Suzuki (鈴木 保) (1947–2025), Japanese football player and manager
- Tamotsu Yatō (矢頭 保) (died 1973), Japanese photographer

== See also ==
- 9096 Tamotsu, main-belt asteroid
