= Tomotaka Kitamura =

Japanese footballer

Tomotaka Kitamura 北村 知隆
Personal information
- Full name: Tomotaka Kitamura
- Date of birth: May 27, 1982 (age 44)
- Place of birth: Yokkaichi, Mie, Japan
- Height: 1.70 m (5 ft 7 in)
- Position: Forward

Youth career
- 1998–2000: Yokkaichi Chuo Technical High School

Senior career*
Years	Team	Apps	(Gls)
2001–2006	Yokohama FC	143	(15)
2007–2012	Montedio Yamagata	152	(20)
2013	Veertien Kuwana	13	(17)
Total		308	(52)
- * Club domestic league appearances and goals

Tomotaka Kitamura (北村 知隆, Kitamura Tomotaka; born May 27, 1982) is a former Japanese football player.

== Playing career ==
Kitamura was born in Yokkaichi on May 27, 1982. After graduating from high school, he joined the newly promoted J2 League club, Yokohama FC in 2001. He played many matches as forward and offensive midfielder during the first season. Although the club results were bad every season until 2005, Yokohama FC won the championship in the 2006 season and was promoted to the J1 League. However he left the club at the end of the 2006 season without playing J1. In 2007, he moved to the J2 club Montedio Yamagata. He became a regular player as a forward. Montedio won second place in 2008 and was promoted to J1. Although he played as a regular player every season, he could hardly play in the match and Montedio finished in last place in 2011. In 2012, Montedio was relegated to J2 and he also could hardly play in the match. In 2013, he moved to his local club Veertien Kuwana in the Prefectural Leagues. He retired at the end of the 2013 season.

== Career statistics ==
Appearances and goals by club, season and competition
Club	Season	League			Emperor's Cup		J.League Cup		Total	
Club	Season	Division	Apps	Goals	Apps	Goals	Apps	Goals	Apps	Goals
Yokohama FC	2001	J2 League	15	3	0	0	0	0	15	3
Yokohama FC	2002	J2 League	19	2	3	0	-		22	2
Yokohama FC	2003	J2 League	17	1	1	0	-		18	1
Yokohama FC	2004	J2 League	30	2	3	1	-		33	3
Yokohama FC	2005	J2 League	30	5	2	0	-		32	5
Yokohama FC	2006	J2 League	32	2	0	0	-		32	2
Yokohama FC	Total		143	15	9	1	0	0	152	16
Montedio Yamagata	2007	J2 League	43	8	2	0	-		45	8
Montedio Yamagata	2008	J2 League	39	5	2	0	-		41	5
Montedio Yamagata	2009	J1 League	29	2	2	0	1	1	32	3
Montedio Yamagata	2010	J1 League	33	5	3	0	6	0	42	5
Montedio Yamagata	2011	J1 League	5	0	0	0	0	0	5	0
Montedio Yamagata	2012	J2 League	3	0	0	0	-		3	0
Montedio Yamagata	Total		152	20	9	0	7	1	168	21
Veertien Kuwana	2013	Prefectural Leagues	13	17	-		-		13	17
Career total			308	52	18	1	7	1	312	37
