= Shingi Ono =

Japanese footballer

Shingi Ono 小野 信義
Personal information
- Full name: Shingi Ono
- Date of birth: April 9, 1974 (age 52)
- Place of birth: Tokyo, Japan
- Height: 1.78 m (5 ft 10 in)
- Position: Midfielder

Youth career
- 1990–1992: Verdy Kawasaki

Senior career*
Years	Team	Apps	(Gls)
1993–1997	Verdy Kawasaki	0	(0)
1996	→Denso (loan)	15	(3)
1998	Gamba Osaka	6	(0)
1999–2005	Yokohama FC	236	(37)
2006–2009	New Wave Kitakyushu	58	(9)
Total		315	(49)
Medal record
Verdy Kawasaki
Winner	J1 League	1993
Winner	J1 League	1994
Runner-up	J1 League	1995
Winner	J.League Cup	1993
Winner	J.League Cup	1994
Runner-up	J.League Cup	1996
Winner	Emperor's Cup	1996
- * Club domestic league appearances and goals

Shingi Ono (小野 信義, Ono Shingi; born April 9, 1974) is a former Japanese football player.

== Playing career ==
Ono was born in Tokyo on April 9, 1974. He joined Verdy Kawasaki from youth team in 1993. However he could not play at all in the match. In July 1996, he moved to Japan Football League club Denso on loan and he played many matches. After he returned to Verdy in 1997, he moved to Gamba Osaka in 1998. Although he debuted in J1 League, he could hardly play in the match. In 1999, he moved to new club Yokohama FC in Japan Football League (JFL). He played many matches and the club won the champions for 2 years in a row (1999-2000). The club was also promoted to J2 League from 2001 and he became a regular player. He played until 2005 season. In 2006, he moved to Regional Leagues club New Wave Kitakyushu. He played as regular player and the club was promoted to JFL from 2008. However his opportunity to play decreased and he retired end of 2009 season.

== Career statistics ==
Appearances and goals by club, season and competition
Club	Season	League			Emperor's Cup		J.League Cup		Total	
Club	Season	Division	Apps	Goals	Apps	Goals	Apps	Goals	Apps	Goals
Verdy Kawasaki	1993	J1 League	0	0	0	0	0	0	0	0
Verdy Kawasaki	1994	J1 League	0	0	0	0	0	0	0	0
Verdy Kawasaki	1995	J1 League	0	0	0	0	—		0	0
Verdy Kawasaki	1996	J1 League	0	0	0	0	0	0	0	0
Denso	1996	Football League	15	3	1	0	—		16	3
Verdy Kawasaki	1997	J1 League	0	0	0	0	0	0	0	0
Gamba Osaka	1998	J1 League	6	0	0	0	1	0	7	0
Yokohama FC	1999	Football League	23	4	3	0	—		26	4
Yokohama FC	2000	Football League	18	6	0	0	—		18	6
Yokohama FC	2001	J2 League	42	14	4	0	4	1	50	15
Yokohama FC	2002	J2 League	42	8	3	1	—		45	9
Yokohama FC	2003	J2 League	39	4	3	2	—		42	6
Yokohama FC	2004	J2 League	42	0	2	0	—		44	0
Yokohama FC	2005	J2 League	30	1	2	1	—		32	2
New Wave Kitakyushu	2006	Regional Leagues	15	6	—		—		15	6
New Wave Kitakyushu	2007	Regional Leagues	19	2	—		—		19	2
New Wave Kitakyushu	2008	Football League	20	1	2	0	—		22	1
New Wave Kitakyushu	2009	Football League	4	0	0	0	—		4	0
Career total			315	49	20	4	5	1	340	54
