= 2001 Yokohama FC season =

Yokohama FC
2001 season
- Manager: Yoshikazu Nagai; Yuji Sakakura; Katsuyoshi Shinto
- Stadium: Yokohama Mitsuzawa Stadium
- J.League 2: 9th
- Emperor's Cup: 4th Round
- J.League Cup: 2nd Round
- Top goalscorer: Shingi Ono (14)
Home colours	Away colours

2001 Yokohama FC season

== Competitions ==
Competitions	Position
J.League 2	9th / 12 clubs
Emperor's Cup	4th round
J.League Cup	2nd round

== Domestic results ==
=== J.League 2 ===
10 March 2001 1	Shonan Bellmare	1-0	Yokohama FC	Hiratsuka Athletics Stadium
JST (UTC+09)

17 March 2001 2	Yokohama FC	2-1 (GG) (a.e.t.)	Vegalta Sendai	Yokohama Mitsuzawa Stadium
JST (UTC+09)

25 March 2001 3	Oita Trinita	3-1	Yokohama FC	Oita Athletic Stadium
JST (UTC+09)

31 March 2001 4	Yokohama FC	1-1 (GG) (a.e.t.)	Omiya Ardija	Yokohama Mitsuzawa Stadium
JST (UTC+09)

8 April 2001 5	Mito HollyHock	2-3 (GG) (a.e.t.)	Yokohama FC	Tochigi Green Stadium
JST (UTC+09)

14 April 2001 6	Montedio Yamagata	2-1	Yokohama FC	Tsuruoka Komakihara Stadium
JST (UTC+09)

21 April 2001 7	Yokohama FC	2-1	Ventforet Kofu	Yokohama Mitsuzawa Stadium
JST (UTC+09)

28 April 2001 8	Sagan Tosu	0-1	Yokohama FC	Tosu Stadium
JST (UTC+09)

3 May 2001 9	Yokohama FC	3-1	Kyoto Purple Sanga	Yokohama Mitsuzawa Stadium
JST (UTC+09)

6 May 2001 10	Albirex Niigata	2-1	Yokohama FC	Niigata City Athletic Stadium
JST (UTC+09)

12 May 2001 11	Yokohama FC	0-6	Kawasaki Frontale	International Stadium Yokohama
JST (UTC+09)

19 May 2001 12	Vegalta Sendai	3-0	Yokohama FC	Sendai Stadium
JST (UTC+09)

23 May 2001 13	Yokohama FC	1-3	Oita Trinita	Nishigaoka Soccer Stadium
JST (UTC+09)

26 May 2001 14	Yokohama FC	1-0 (GG) (a.e.t.)	Montedio Yamagata	Yokohama Mitsuzawa Stadium
JST (UTC+09)

16 June 2001 15	Ventforet Kofu	2-0	Yokohama FC	Kose Sports Park Stadium
JST (UTC+09)

23 June 2001 16	Yokohama FC	1-0	Albirex Niigata	Yokohama Mitsuzawa Stadium
JST (UTC+09)

29 June 2001 17	Kawasaki Frontale	2-1	Yokohama FC	Todoroki Athletics Stadium
JST (UTC+09)

8 July 2001 18	Yokohama FC	2-1	Sagan Tosu	Yokohama Mitsuzawa Stadium
JST (UTC+09)

11 July 2001 19	Kyoto Purple Sanga	2-1	Yokohama FC	Nishikyogoku Athletic Stadium
JST (UTC+09)

14 July 2001 20	Yokohama FC	2-1	Shonan Bellmare	Yokohama Mitsuzawa Stadium
JST (UTC+09)

21 July 2001 21	Omiya Ardija	2-0	Yokohama FC	Omiya Football Stadium
JST (UTC+09)

25 July 2001 22	Yokohama FC	5-0	Mito HollyHock	Yokohama Mitsuzawa Stadium
JST (UTC+09)

28 July 2001 23	Yokohama FC	1-3	Kawasaki Frontale	Yokohama Mitsuzawa Stadium
JST (UTC+09)

3 August 2001 24	Oita Trinita	2-1	Yokohama FC	Oita Athletic Stadium
JST (UTC+09)

11 August 2001 25	Sagan Tosu	0-3	Yokohama FC	Nagasaki Athletic Stadium
JST (UTC+09)

14 August 2001 26	Yokohama FC	1-2	Kyoto Purple Sanga	Yokohama Mitsuzawa Stadium
JST (UTC+09)

18 August 2001 27	Montedio Yamagata	1-0	Yokohama FC	Yamagata City Athletic Stadium
JST (UTC+09)

26 August 2001 28	Yokohama FC	1-2 (GG) (a.e.t.)	Ventforet Kofu	Yokohama Mitsuzawa Stadium
JST (UTC+09)

1 September 2001 29	Yokohama FC	1-3	Omiya Ardija	Yokohama Mitsuzawa Stadium
JST (UTC+09)

5 September 2001 30	Mito HollyHock	1-0 (GG) (a.e.t.)	Yokohama FC	Kasamatsu Stadium
JST (UTC+09)

8 September 2001 31	Albirex Niigata	5-1	Yokohama FC	Niigata Stadium
JST (UTC+09)

14 September 2001 32	Yokohama FC	3-4	Vegalta Sendai	Yumenoshima Stadium
JST (UTC+09)

19 September 2001 33	Shonan Bellmare	1-0	Yokohama FC	Hiratsuka Athletics Stadium
JST (UTC+09)

22 September 2001 34	Yokohama FC	1-0	Sagan Tosu	Technoport Fukui Stadium
JST (UTC+09)

28 September 2001 35	Ventforet Kofu	1-3	Yokohama FC	Kose Sports Park Stadium
JST (UTC+09)

6 October 2001 36	Yokohama FC	0-2	Montedio Yamagata	Yokohama Mitsuzawa Stadium
JST (UTC+09)

13 October 2001 37	Kyoto Purple Sanga	2-3	Yokohama FC	Nishikyogoku Athletic Stadium
JST (UTC+09)

17 October 2001 38	Yokohama FC	0-1	Albirex Niigata	Yokohama Mitsuzawa Stadium
JST (UTC+09)

20 October 2001 39	Kawasaki Frontale	2-1 (GG) (a.e.t.)	Yokohama FC	Edogawa Stadium
JST (UTC+09)

28 October 2001 40	Yokohama FC	0-5	Shonan Bellmare	Yokohama Mitsuzawa Stadium
JST (UTC+09)

3 November 2001 41	Vegalta Sendai	2-1	Yokohama FC	Sendai Stadium
JST (UTC+09)

6 November 2001 42	Yokohama FC	2-4	Oita Trinita	Yokohama Mitsuzawa Stadium
JST (UTC+09)

10 November 2001 43	Omiya Ardija	2-0	Yokohama FC	Omiya Football Stadium
JST (UTC+09)

18 November 2001 44	Yokohama FC	6-0	Mito HollyHock	Yokohama Mitsuzawa Stadium
JST (UTC+09)

=== Emperor's Cup ===
25 November 2001 1st Round	Saitama SC	0-14	Yokohama FC	Omiya Football Stadium
JST (UTC+09)

2 December 2001 2nd Round	Yokohama FC	5-0	NTT West Kumamoto	Yokohama Mitsuzawa Stadium
JST (UTC+09)

9 December 2001 3rd Round	FC Tokyo	0-1	Yokohama FC	Tokyo Stadium
JST (UTC+09)

16 December 2001 4th Round	Yokohama FC	1-3	Kawasaki Frontale	Tokushima Naruto Stadium
JST (UTC+09)

=== J.League Cup ===
4 April 2001 1st Round-1	Yokohama FC	1-1	Tokyo Verdy 1969	Yokohama Mitsuzawa Stadium
JST (UTC+09)

18 April 2001 1st Round-2	Tokyo Verdy 1969	0-2 (0-2 agg.)	Yokohama FC	Tokyo Stadium
JST (UTC+09)

13 June 2001 2nd Round-1	Yokohama FC	0-1	Kawasaki Frontale	Yokohama Mitsuzawa Stadium
JST (UTC+09)

20 June 2001 2nd Round-2	Kawasaki Frontale	2-1 (3-1 agg.)	Yokohama FC	Todoroki Athletics Stadium
JST (UTC+09)

== Player statistics ==
No.	Pos.	Nat.	Player	D.o.B. (Age)	Height / Weight	J.League 2		Emperor's Cup		J.League Cup		Total	
No.	Pos.	Nat.	Player	D.o.B. (Age)	Height / Weight	Apps	Goals	Apps	Goals	Apps	Goals	Apps	Goals
1	GK	(Japan)	Hiroki Mizuhara	January 15, 1975 (aged 26)	cm / kg	42	0						
2	DF	(Japan)	Yukinori Shigeta	July 15, 1976 (aged 24)	cm / kg	38	0						
3	MF	(Japan)	Tsuyoshi Yoshitake	September 8, 1981 (aged 19)	cm / kg	16	1						
4	DF	(Japan)	Mikio Manaka	May 22, 1969 (aged 31)	cm / kg	17	1						
5	DF	(Japan)	Masakazu Koda	September 12, 1969 (aged 31)	cm / kg	5	0						
6	DF	(Japan)	Hiroaki Kumon	October 20, 1966 (aged 34)	cm / kg	26	0						
7	MF	(Japan)	Yoshikazu Goto	February 20, 1964 (aged 37)	cm / kg	42	1						
8	DF	(Japan)	Masaaki Takada	July 26, 1973 (aged 27)	cm / kg	20	0						
9	FW	(Japan)	Kenji Arima	November 26, 1972 (aged 28)	cm / kg	42	10						
10	FW	(Japan)	Yuichi Yoda	June 25, 1977 (aged 23)	cm / kg	12	2						
11	MF	(Japan)	Kosaku Masuda	April 30, 1976 (aged 24)	cm / kg	29	3						
12	GK	(Japan)	Akihiro Yoshida	May 28, 1975 (aged 25)	cm / kg	2	0						
13	MF	(Japan)	Hirotoshi Yokoyama	May 9, 1975 (aged 25)	cm / kg	27	1						
14	MF	(Japan)	Narita Takaki	April 5, 1977 (aged 23)	cm / kg	42	2						
15	FW	(Japan)	Hiroaki Tajima	June 27, 1974 (aged 26)	cm / kg	41	3						
16	MF	(Japan)	Taijiro Kurita	March 3, 1975 (aged 26)	cm / kg	16	0						
17	FW	(Japan)	Tomotaka Kitamura	May 27, 1982 (aged 18)	cm / kg	15	3						
18	FW	(Japan)	Shingi Ono	April 9, 1974 (aged 26)	cm / kg	42	14						
19	DF	(Japan)	Tomohide Nakazawa	September 13, 1980 (aged 20)	cm / kg	15	0						
20	DF	(Japan)	Tamotsu Komatsuzaki	July 10, 1970 (aged 30)	cm / kg	23	0						
21	GK	(Japan)	Satoshi Watanabe	June 8, 1982 (aged 18)	cm / kg	0	0						
22	FW	(Japan)	Shintaro Nara	November 13, 1982 (aged 18)	cm / kg	0	0						
23	MF	(Japan)	Naoki Ishibashi	May 14, 1981 (aged 19)	cm / kg	0	0						
24	FW	(Japan)	Masami Sato	August 26, 1981 (aged 19)	cm / kg	22	3						
25	DF	(Japan)	Shingo Morita	December 9, 1978 (aged 22)	cm / kg	40	3						
26	FW	(Japan)	Takuya Jinno	June 1, 1970 (aged 30)	cm / kg	25	8						
27	DF	(Japan)	Shinya Sakoi	May 8, 1977 (aged 23)	cm / kg	17	0						

== Other pages ==
- (in Japanese) J.League official site
