= Tsuyoshi Yoshitake =

Japanese footballer

Tsuyoshi Yoshitake 吉武 剛
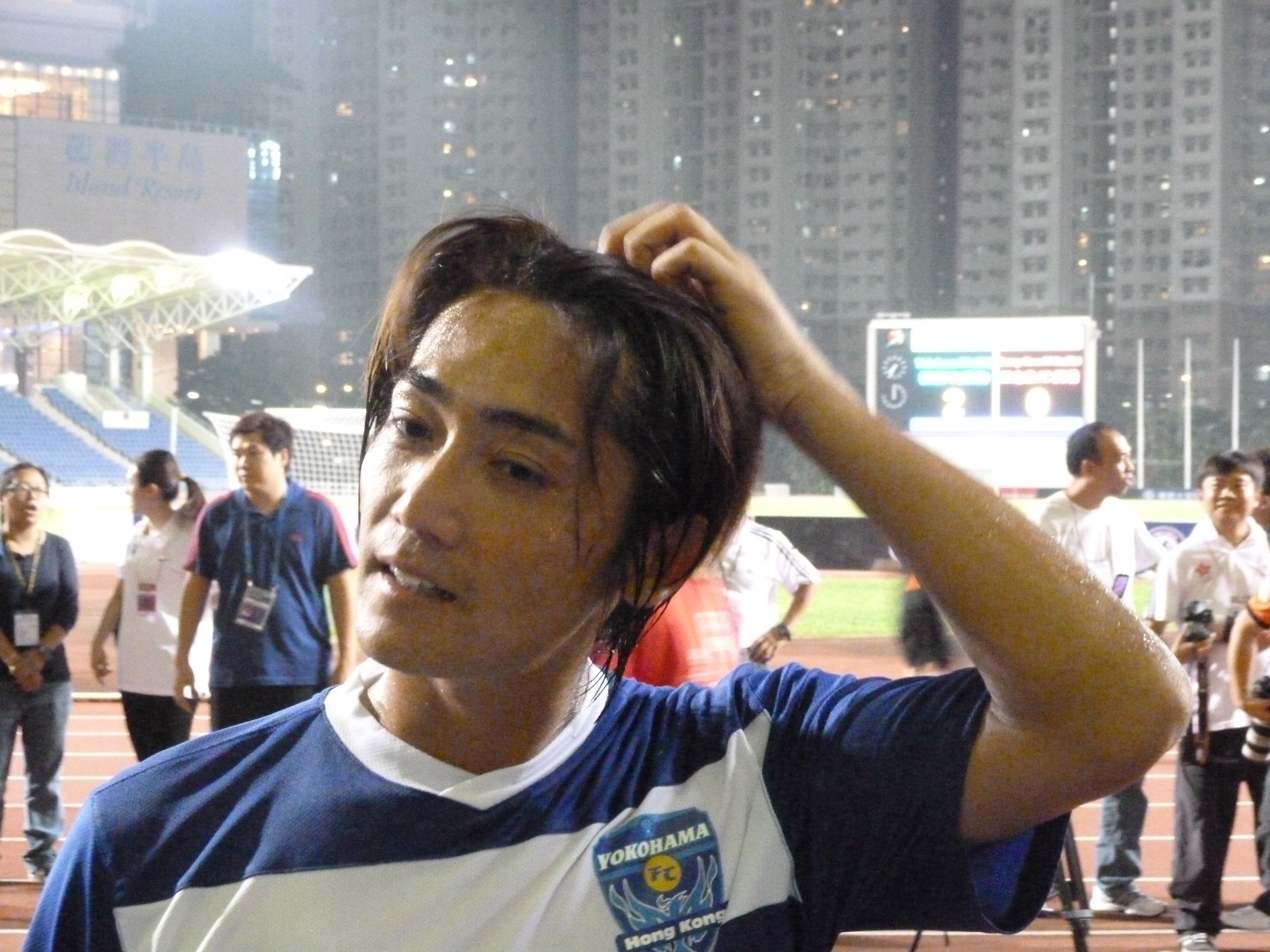

Personal information
- Full name: Tsuyoshi Yoshitake
- Date of birth: September 8, 1981 (age 45)
- Place of birth: Mie, Japan
- Height: 1.74 m (5 ft 9 in)
- Position: Midfielder

Youth career
- 1997–1999: Tsu Technical High School

Senior career*
Years	Team	Apps	(Gls)
2000–2006	Yokohama FC	133	(9)
2007–2008	Tokyo Verdy	5	(1)
2009	Charleston Battery	26	(6)
2010	Crystal Palace Baltimore	24	(3)
2010	Austin Aztex	7	(0)
2011–2012	Tampa Bay Rowdies	41	(7)
2012–2014	Yokohama FC Hong Kong	24	(11)
2014–2015	Yuen Long	14	(5)
Total		274	(42)
- * Club domestic league appearances and goals

Tsuyoshi Yoshitake (吉武 剛, Yoshitake Tsuyoshi; born September 8, 1981) is a Japanese former football player.

== Playing career ==
=== Japan ===
Yoshitake attended Tsu Technical High School, where he was selected to the prefecture's select team to take part in a tournament in Brazil. He began his professional career in the Winter of 2000 when he joined Yokohama FC, for whom he scored nine goals in his 133 appearances over the course of six years and became the fans' favorite player before being transferred to Tokyo Verdy. During his one year in the Japanese Capital city injury limited him to playing only five times, scoring one goal.

=== United States ===
On March 24, 2009 Yoshitake left Tokyo Verdy and completed a move to the Charleston Battery of the USL First Division in the United States. Given the #10, and on April 24, 2009, during his home debut, he scored his first goal for the Battery from the penalty spot to tie up their game with Minnesota Thunder. The game finished 1-1. For his rookie year, he was in charge of all set pieces for the team, scoring 6 goals, and 5 assists. He also earned the Weekly Honors 5 times during this season, and was given the team's "Newcomer of the Year" award.
Yoshitake announced his move to Crystal Palace Baltimore in February, 2010, and again was given the #10 as the team's ace attacker. In a 2012 match against the MN Stars on July 16, Yoshitake scored a critical goal in the late first half, catching the Stars defense sleeping. The goal happened to be a game changer, as the Rowdies won 2-1.

In September 2010 Austin Aztex, who was preparing for the Playoffs, acquired Yoshitake from Baltimore on loan for the remainder of the season. His New Jersey number was 9.

Yoshitake signed a two-year contract with FC Tampa Bay of the North American Soccer League on February 16, 2011. Yoshitake played in 40 matches during his Tampa Bay career. He scored seven goals and totaled five assists during his two seasons there, and also earned NASL Player of the Month for June, 2012.

=== Hong Kong ===
However, announced his move to Yokohama FC Hong Kong during the season on August 4, 2012, and serves as the team captain. Yoshitake had a superb debut season recording 9 goals. He finished fifth place in the league and was voted to the Hong Kong All Star XI for the 2013 Lunar New Year Cup squad, and also the league's Best XI. On June 4, 2014, Yoshitake announced his signing with Yuen Long FC in the same league. On June 12, 2015, he announced his retirement on his Official Blog.

== Club statistics ==
Club performance			League		Cup		League Cup		Total	
Season	Club	League	Apps	Goals	Apps	Goals	Apps	Goals	Apps	Goals
Japan			League		Emperor's Cup		J.League Cup		Total	
2000	Yokohama FC	Football League	0	0	0	0	-		0	0
2001	Yokohama FC	J2 League	16	1	4	2	0	0	20	3
2002	Yokohama FC	J2 League	41	2	3	1	-		44	3
2003	Yokohama FC	J2 League	14	2	2	1	-		16	3
2004	Yokohama FC	J2 League	9	0	0	0	-		9	0
2005	Yokohama FC	J2 League	27	2	2	0	-		29	2
2006	Yokohama FC	J2 League	26	2	1	0	-		27	2
2007	Tokyo Verdy	J2 League	5	1	0	0	-		5	1
2008	Tokyo Verdy	J1 League	0	0	0	0	1	0	1	0
United States			League		Open Cup		League Cup		Total	
2009	Charleston Battery	USL First Division	26	6	3	2	-		29	8
2010	Crystal Palace Baltimore	D2 Pro League	24	3	1	0	-		24	3
2010	Austin Aztex FC	D2 Pro League	7 ^{(1)}	0	-		-		7	0
2011	FC Tampa Bay	NASL	26 ^{(2)}	1	-		-		26	1
2012	Tampa Bay Rowdies	NASL	15	6	0	0	-		15	6
Hong Kong			League		FA Cup		League Cup + Senior Shield		Total	
2012-13	Yokohama FC Hong Kong	Hong Kong First Division	12	9	-		-		12	9
2013-14	Yokohama FC Hong Kong	Hong Kong First Division	12	2	-		-		12	2
2014-15	Yuen Long FC	Hong Kong First Division	14	5	2	1	5	0	21	6
Country	Japan		138	10	12	4	1	0	151	14
Country	United States		98	16	4	2	-		102	18
Country	Hong Kong		38	16	2	1	5	0	45	17
Total			274	42	18	7	6	0	298	49

(1) 5 League Appierences and 2 Play-Off Appierences

(2) 25 League Appierences and 1 Play-Off Appierences

== Playing style ==
Small in size but speedy on and off the ball, Yoshitake is able to run at defenders and take them on with high technique dribbling. Capable on both feet, he is a good creative output in the attacking third and frequently serves up dangerous crosses and can entertain the idea of an occasional long shot. Head Coach Mike Anhaeuser described him "He's so creative and he's almost impossible to stop one-on-one. He's given us another weapon up top, someone that can really serve the ball into the box and score goals" in an interview

== Honors and awards ==
=== Personal ===
- 2012-13: Hong Kong First Division - Hong Kong All Star XI for the Lunar New Year Cup 2013 squad
- 2012-13: Hong Kong First Division - Best XI
- 2012: NASL Player of the Month - June
- 2009: Charleston Battery Newcomer of the Year award
- 2009: USL1 Weekly Honor - 5 weeks
- 2002: Yokohama FC MVP

=== Team ===
- 2007: Promotion to J1 (J2 Runner Up)- Tokyo Verdy
- 2006: Promotion to J1 (Champion of J2) - Yokohama FC
- 2001: Promotion to J2 (Champion of JFL) - Yokohama FC
