= Shingo Morita =

Japanese footballer

Shingo Morita 森田 真吾
Personal information
- Full name: Shingo Morita
- Date of birth: December 9, 1978 (age 47)
- Place of birth: Kochi, Japan
- Height: 1.71 m (5 ft 7 1/2 in)
- Position: Defender

Youth career
- 1994–1996: Teikyo High School
- 1997–2000: Juntendo University

Senior career*
Years	Team	Apps	(Gls)
2001–2002	Yokohama FC	60	(6)
2003	TDK		
2004	Rad		
2004–2005	Mito HollyHock	35	(2)
2006	Ventforet Kofu	0	(0)
2007–2011	Tonan Maebashi		
Total		95	(8)
- * Club domestic league appearances and goals

Shingo Morita (森田 真吾, Morita Shingo; born December 9, 1978) is a former Japanese football player.

== Playing career ==
Morita was born in Kochi Prefecture on December 9, 1978. After graduating from Juntendo University, he joined newly was promoted to J2 League club, Yokohama FC in 2001. He became a regular player as left side back from first season. However he could not play at all in the match from summer 2002. In 2003, he moved to Regional Leagues club TDK.

After finished at TDK in 2003 season, Morita had also a short spell in Europe with Serbian club FK Rad, playing with them the second half of the 2003-04 First League of Serbia and Montenegro season.

In September 2004, Morita returned to Japan and joined J2 club Mito HollyHock. He mainly played many matches as left midfielder. In 2006, he moved to J1 League club Ventforet Kofu. However he could not play at all in the match. In 2007, he moved to Prefectural Leagues club Tonan SC Gunma (later Tonan Maebashi). Tonan was promoted to Regional Leagues from 2009. He retired at the end of the 2011 season.

== Career statistics ==
Appearances and goals by club, season and competition
Club	Season	League			Emperor's Cup		J.League Cup		Total	
Club	Season	Division	Apps	Goals	Apps	Goals	Apps	Goals	Apps	Goals
Yokohama FC	2001	J2 League	40	3	4	1	4	1	48	5
Yokohama FC	2002	J2 League	20	3	0	0	—		20	3
TDK	2003	Regional Leagues			2	3	—		2	3
Mito HollyHock	2004	J2 League	8	1	2	1	—		10	2
Mito HollyHock	2005	J2 League	27	1	0	0	—		27	1
Ventforet Kofu	2006	J1 League	0	0	0	0	1	0	1	0
Tonan SC Gunma	2007	Prefectural Leagues			0	0	—		0	0
Tonan Maebashi	2008	Prefectural Leagues			—		—			
Tonan Maebashi	2009	Regional Leagues	10	0	—		—		10	0
Tonan Maebashi	2010	Regional Leagues	5	0	—		—		5	0
Tonan Maebashi	2011	Regional Leagues								
Career total			110	8	8	5	5	1	123	14
