= 2003 Yokohama FC season =

Yokohama FC
2003 season
- Manager: Pierre Littbarski
- Stadium: Yokohama Mitsuzawa Stadium
- J.League 2: 11th
- Emperor's Cup: 3rd Round
- Top goalscorer: Shoji Jo (12)
Home colours	Away colours

2003 Yokohama FC season

== Competitions ==
Competitions	Position
J.League 2	11th / 12 clubs
Emperor's Cup	3rd round

== Domestic results ==
=== J.League 2 ===
Match	Date	Venue	Opponents	Score
1	2003.3.15	Sapporo Dome	Consadole Sapporo	3-1
2	2003.3.22	Mitsuzawa Stadium	Omiya Ardija	0-1
3	2003.3.29	Mitsuzawa Stadium	Albirex Niigata	1-0
4	2003.4.5	Yamagata Park Stadium	Montedio Yamagata	1-1
5	2003.4.9	Hakata no mori stadium	Avispa Fukuoka	2-3
6	2003.4.12	Mitsuzawa Stadium	Ventforet Kofu	1-5
7	2003.4.19	Hiroshima Big Arch	Sanfrecce Hiroshima	1-6
8	2003.4.26	Mitsuzawa Stadium	Shonan Bellmare	2-0
9	2003.4.29	Kasamatsu Stadium	Mito HollyHock	0-2
10	2003.5.5	Mitsuzawa Stadium	Sagan Tosu	1-1
11	2003.5.10	Todoroki Athletics Stadium	Kawasaki Frontale	1-1
12	2003.5.14	Mitsuzawa Stadium	Consadole Sapporo	0-0
13	2003.5.18	Ōmiya Park Soccer Stadium	Omiya Ardija	2-0
14	2003.5.24	Niigata City Athletic Stadium	Albirex Niigata	1-2
15	2003.6.1	Mitsuzawa Stadium	Montedio Yamagata	0-4
16	2003.6.8	Tosu Stadium	Sagan Tosu	2-5
17	2003.6.14	Mitsuzawa Stadium	Kawasaki Frontale	0-4
18	2003.6.18	Hiratsuka Athletics Stadium	Shonan Bellmare	1-1
19	2003.6.21	Mitsuzawa Stadium	Sanfrecce Hiroshima	0-1
20	2003.6.28	Kose Sports Stadium	Ventforet Kofu	1-1
21	2003.7.2	Mitsuzawa Stadium	Avispa Fukuoka	1-1
22	2003.7.5	Mitsuzawa Stadium	Mito HollyHock	1-2
23	2003.7.19	Todoroki Athletics Stadium	Kawasaki Frontale	3-3
24	2003.7.26	Mitsuzawa Stadium	Omiya Ardija	0-3
25	2003.7.30	Sapporo Atsubetsu Park Stadium	Consadole Sapporo	2-2
26	2003.8.3	Yamagata Park Stadium	Montedio Yamagata	2-1
27	2003.8.10	Mitsuzawa Stadium	Sagan Tosu	3-1
28	2003.8.16	Hiroshima Stadium	Sanfrecce Hiroshima	0-3
29	2003.8.23	Mitsuzawa Stadium	Ventforet Kofu	1-2
30	2003.8.30	Hakata no mori stadium	Avispa Fukuoka	1-1
31	2003.9.3	Mitsuzawa Stadium	Shonan Bellmare	1-0
32	2003.9.6	Kasamatsu Stadium	Mito HollyHock	0-0
33	2003.9.13	Fukushima (ja:福島県営あづま陸上競技場)	Albirex Niigata	1-7
34	2003.9.20	Yumenoshima Stadium	Sanfrecce Hiroshima	0-2
35	2003.9.23	Kose Sports Stadium	Ventforet Kofu	0-3
36	2003.9.28	International Stadium Yokohama	Kawasaki Frontale	2-5
37	2003.10.4	Hiratsuka Athletics Stadium	Shonan Bellmare	0-1
38	2003.10.11	Mitsuzawa Stadium	Mito HollyHock	2-1
39	2003.10.19	Tosu Stadium	Sagan Tosu	1-1
40	2003.10.25	Mitsuzawa Stadium	Avispa Fukuoka	0-1
41	2003.11.1	Mitsuzawa Stadium	Montedio Yamagata	4-2
42	2003.11.8	Niigata Stadium	Albirex Niigata	2-4
43	2003.11.15	Ōmiya Park Soccer Stadium	Omiya Ardija	0-3
44	2003.11.23	International Stadium Yokohama	Consadole Sapporo	2-0

=== Emperor's Cup ===
Match	Date	Venue	Opponents	Score
1st round	2003..			-
2nd round	2003..			-
3rd round	2003..			-

== Player statistics ==
No.	Pos.	Player	D.o.B. (Age)	Height / Weight	J.League 2		Emperor's Cup		Total	
No.	Pos.	Player	D.o.B. (Age)	Height / Weight	Apps	Goals	Apps	Goals	Apps	Goals
1	GK	Hiroki Mizuhara	January 15, 1975 (aged 28)	cm / kg	19	0				
2	DF	Yukinori Shigeta	July 15, 1976 (aged 26)	cm / kg	30	0				
3	DF	Kohei Usui	July 16, 1979 (aged 23)	cm / kg	39	4				
4	DF	Mikio Manaka	May 22, 1969 (aged 33)	cm / kg	28	2				
5	DF	Tomonobu Hayakawa	July 11, 1977 (aged 25)	cm / kg	21	1				
6	DF	Fernando Moner	December 30, 1967 (aged 35)	cm / kg	0	0				
6	DF	Mathieu Boots	June 23, 1975 (aged 27)	cm / kg	33	4				
7	MF	Narita Takaki	April 5, 1977 (aged 25)	cm / kg	23	1				
8	MF	Tsuyoshi Yoshitake	September 8, 1981 (aged 21)	cm / kg	14	2				
9	FW	Kenji Oshiba	November 19, 1973 (aged 29)	cm / kg	8	0				
9	FW	Dirk Lehmann	August 16, 1971 (aged 31)	cm / kg	12	1				
10	FW	Masami Sato	August 26, 1981 (aged 21)	cm / kg	16	2				
11	MF	Kosaku Masuda	April 30, 1976 (aged 26)	cm / kg	16	0				
12	GK	Akihiro Yoshida	May 28, 1975 (aged 27)	cm / kg	2	0				
13	MF	Hirotoshi Yokoyama	May 9, 1975 (aged 27)	cm / kg	39	3				
14	FW	Masato Ishida	April 17, 1983 (aged 19)	cm / kg	0	0				
15	MF	Tomoyoshi Ono	August 12, 1979 (aged 23)	cm / kg	41	0				
16	FW	Takuya Jinno	June 1, 1970 (aged 32)	cm / kg	10	0				
17	FW	Tomotaka Kitamura	May 27, 1982 (aged 20)	cm / kg	17	1				
18	MF	Shingi Ono	April 9, 1974 (aged 28)	cm / kg	39	4				
19	DF	Shunsuke Mori	April 29, 1984 (aged 18)	cm / kg	0	0				
20	FW	Tetsuya Ōkubo	March 9, 1980 (aged 23)	cm / kg	20	3				
21	GK	Takanori Sugeno	May 3, 1984 (aged 18)	cm / kg	24	0				
22	MF	Tomoya Uchida	July 10, 1983 (aged 19)	cm / kg	26	3				
23	DF	Rudi Vata	February 13, 1970 (aged 33)	cm / kg	24	3				
24	FW	Vanderven	March 1, 1970 (aged 33)	cm / kg	9	1				
24	MF	Yoshikazu Goto	February 20, 1964 (aged 39)	cm / kg	3	0				
25	FW	Shoji Jo	June 17, 1975 (aged 27)	cm / kg	33	12				
26	DF	Mitsunori Yamao	April 13, 1973 (aged 29)	cm / kg	38	1				
27	DF	Jungo Kono	July 9, 1982 (aged 20)	cm / kg	22	1				
28	FW	Minoru Takenaka	November 19, 1976 (aged 26)	cm / kg	2	0				

== Other pages ==
- (in Japanese) J. League official site
