= Kenji Arima =

Japanese footballer and manager

Kenji Arima 有馬 賢二
Personal information
- Full name: Kenji Arima
- Date of birth: November 26, 1972 (age 53)
- Place of birth: Yokohama, Japan
- Height: 1.78 m (5 ft 10 in)
- Position: Forward

Youth career
- 1988–1990: Nihon University Fujisawa High School
- 1991–1994: Nihon University

Senior career*
Years	Team	Apps	(Gls)
1995–1997	Kashiwa Reysol	20	(2)
1998	Consadole Sapporo	10	(2)
1999–2002	Yokohama FC	113	(55)
Total		143	(59)

Managerial career
- 2014–2015: YSCC Yokohama
- 2019–2021: Fagiano Okayama
- * Club domestic league appearances and goals

Kenji Arima (有馬 賢二, Arima Kenji; born November 26, 1972) is a former Japanese football player and manager.

== Playing career ==
Arima was born in Yokohama on November 26, 1972. After graduating from Nihon University, he joined Kashiwa Reysol in 1995 which had been newly promoted to the J1 League. He mainly played as a substitute for 3 seasons. In 1998, he moved to Consadole Sapporo, and in 1999, to Yokohama FC, a new club in the Japan Football League based in Arima's home city. He was a regular player and the club were the league champions for 2 years in a row (1999-2000) and were promoted to the J2 League in 2001. Arima also became the top scorer and was presented the MVP award in 2000. He retired at the end of the 2002 season.

== Coaching career ==
After retirement, Arima started coaching career at FC Tokyo in 2003. He mainly coached youth team until 2013. In 2014, he moved to newly was promoted to J3 League club, YSCC Yokohama and became a manager. Although he managed the club in 2 seasons, the club was at the bottom place for 2 years in a row and he resigned end of 2015 season. In 2019, he signed with J2 League club Fagiano Okayama.

== Club statistics ==
Club performance			League		Cup		League Cup		Total	
Season	Club	League	Apps	Goals	Apps	Goals	Apps	Goals	Apps	Goals
Japan			League		Emperor's Cup		J.League Cup		Total	
1995	Kashiwa Reysol	J1 League	7	0	0	0	-		7	0
1996	Kashiwa Reysol	J1 League	8	2	2	0	8	2	18	4
1997	Kashiwa Reysol	J1 League	5	0	0	0	5	1	10	1
1998	Consadole Sapporo	J1 League	10	2	1	0	3	1	14	3
1999	Yokohama FC	Football League	24	19	3	3	-		27	22
2000	Yokohama FC	Football League	22	24	2	3	-		24	27
2001	Yokohama FC	J2 League	42	10	2	2	3	0	47	12
2002	Yokohama FC	J2 League	25	2	3	1	-		28	3
Total			143	59	13	9	19	4	175	72

== Managerial statistics ==
Update; December 31, 2018

Team	From	To	Record				
Team	From	To	G	W	D	L	Win %
YSCC Yokohama	2014	2015	69	11	18	40	15.94
Fagiano Okayama	2019	present					
Total			69	11	18	40	15.94
