= Hirotoshi Yokoyama =

Japanese footballer

Hirotoshi Yokoyama 横山 博敏
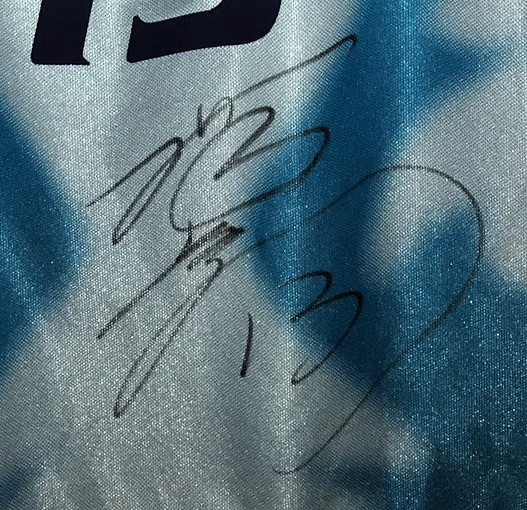
- Autograph

Personal information
- Full name: Hirotoshi Yokoyama
- Date of birth: May 9, 1975 (age 51)
- Place of birth: Kagoshima, Japan
- Height: 1.70 m (5 ft 7 in)
- Position: Midfielder

Youth career
- 1991–1993: Kagoshima Jitsugyo High School
- 1994–1997: Osaka University of Commerce

Senior career*
Years	Team	Apps	(Gls)
1998–1999	JEF United Ichihara	27	(0)
2000–2004	Yokohama FC	101	(11)
2004–2005	Ventforet Kofu	17	(1)
2006–2007	TDK	28	(5)
Total		173	(17)

Managerial career
- 2010–2011: Blaublitz Akita
Medal record
JEF United Ichihara
Runner-up	J.League Cup	1998
- * Club domestic league appearances and goals

Hirotoshi Yokoyama (横山 博敏, Yokoyama Hirotoshi; born May 9, 1975) is a former Japanese football player.

== Playing career ==
Yokoyama was born in Kagoshima Prefecture on May 9, 1975. After graduating from Osaka University of Commerce, he joined J1 League club JEF United Ichihara in 1998. He played many matches from first season. In 2000, he moved to Japan Football League (JFL) club Yokohama FC. He played many matches and the club won the champions in 2000 and was promoted to J2 League from 2001. Although he could not play at all in the match in 2002, he became a regular player in 2003. However his opportunity to play decreased in 2004. In September 2004, he moved to J2 club Ventforet Kofu and played as regular player. However he could hardly play in the match in 2005. In 2006, he moved to Regional Leagues club TDK. He played many matches and the club was promoted to JFL from 2007. He retired end of 2007 season.

== Coaching career ==
After retirement, Yokoyama started coaching career at TDK (later Blaublitz Akita) in 2008. In 2010, he became a manager and managed the club until end of 2011 season.

== Club statistics ==
Club performance			League		Cup		League Cup		Total	
Season	Club	League	Apps	Goals	Apps	Goals	Apps	Goals	Apps	Goals
Japan			League		Emperor's Cup		J.League Cup		Total	
1998	JEF United Ichihara	J1 League	11	0	0	0	0	0	11	0
1999	JEF United Ichihara	J1 League	16	0	0	0	2	0	18	0
2000	Yokohama FC	Football League	21	7	2	0	-		23	7
2001	Yokohama FC	J2 League	27	1	1	0	3	1	31	2
2002	Yokohama FC	J2 League	2	0	2	0	-		4	0
2003	Yokohama FC	J2 League	39	3	3	1	-		42	4
2004	Yokohama FC	J2 League	12	0	0	0	-		12	0
2004	Ventforet Kofu	J2 League	12	0	2	0	-		14	0
2005	Ventforet Kofu	J2 League	5	1	0	0	-		5	1
2006	TDK	Regional Leagues	12	5	2	0	-		14	5
2007	TDK	Football League	16	0	0	0	-		16	0
Total			173	17	12	1	5	1	190	19
