= 2002 Yokohama FC season =

Yokohama FC
2002 season
- Manager: Katsuyoshi Shinto
- Stadium: Yokohama Mitsuzawa Stadium
- J.League 2: 12th
- Emperor's Cup: 3rd Round
- Top goalscorer: Takuya Jinno (8); Shingi Ono (8)
Home colours	Away colours

2002 Yokohama FC season

== Competitions ==
Competitions	Position
J.League 2	12th / 12 clubs
Emperor's Cup	3rd round

== Domestic results ==
=== J.League 2 ===
Match	Date	Venue	Opponents	Score
1	2002.3.3	Mitsuzawa Stadium	Ventforet Kofu	3-2
2	2002.3.9	Mitsuzawa Stadium	Albirex Niigata	0-2
3	2002.3.16	Ōmiya Park Soccer Stadium	Omiya Ardija	0-1
4	2002.3.21	Hakata no mori stadium	Avispa Fukuoka	1-1
5	2002.3.24	Yumenoshima Stadium	Oita Trinita	1-2
6	2002.3.30	International Stadium Yokohama	Kawasaki Frontale	2-3
7	2002.4.6	Nagai Aid Stadium	Cerezo Osaka	1-1
8	2002.4.10	Mitsuzawa (ja:横浜市Mitsuzawa Stadium公園陸上競技場)	Shonan Bellmare	2-2
9	2002.4.13	Hitachinaka (ja:ひたちなか市総合運動公園陸上競技場)	Mito HollyHock	1-1
10	2002.4.20	Mitsuzawa (ja:横浜市Mitsuzawa Stadium公園陸上競技場)	Sagan Tosu	1-2
11	2002.4.24	Yamagata Park Stadium	Montedio Yamagata	1-1
12	2002.4.27	Niigata Stadium	Albirex Niigata	0-2
13	2002.5.3	Mitsuzawa Stadium	Avispa Fukuoka	1-0
14	2002.5.6	Ōita (ja:大分市営陸上競技場)	Oita Trinita	0-2
15	2002.5.12	Todoroki Athletics Stadium	Kawasaki Frontale	2-1
16	2002.7.6	Mitsuzawa Stadium	Cerezo Osaka	0-1
17	2002.7.10	Hiratsuka Athletics Stadium	Shonan Bellmare	0-3
18	2002.7.14	Mitsuzawa Stadium	Montedio Yamagata	2-1
19	2002.7.20	Kose Sports Stadium	Ventforet Kofu	0-1
20	2002.7.24	Mitsuzawa (ja:横浜市Mitsuzawa Stadium公園陸上競技場)	Mito HollyHock	1-1
21	2002.7.27	Tosu Stadium	Sagan Tosu	1-4
22	2002.8.3	Mitsuzawa (ja:横浜市Mitsuzawa Stadium公園陸上競技場)	Omiya Ardija	1-4
23	2002.8.7	Todoroki Athletics Stadium	Kawasaki Frontale	0-1
24	2002.8.10	Yamagata Park Stadium	Montedio Yamagata	0-2
25	2002.8.17	Yumenoshima Stadium	Shonan Bellmare	1-3
26	2002.8.21	Kasamatsu Stadium	Mito HollyHock	1-3
27	2002.8.25	Mitsuzawa (ja:横浜市Mitsuzawa Stadium公園陸上競技場)	Albirex Niigata	1-2
28	2002.8.31	Yumenoshima Stadium	Ventforet Kofu	1-1
29	2002.9.7	Nagai Stadium	Cerezo Osaka	1-2
30	2002.9.11	Mitsuzawa (ja:横浜市Mitsuzawa Stadium公園陸上競技場)	Sagan Tosu	1-0
31	2002.9.14	Hakata no mori stadium	Avispa Fukuoka	2-1
32	2002.9.21	Edogawa Stadium	Oita Trinita	3-4
33	2002.9.25	Ōmiya Park Soccer Stadium	Omiya Ardija	0-0
34	2002.9.28	Yumenoshima Stadium	Kawasaki Frontale	0-2
35	2002.10.5	Mitsuzawa Stadium	Mito HollyHock	1-1
36	2002.10.9	Saga Stadium	Sagan Tosu	0-1
37	2002.10.12	Mitsuzawa Stadium	Avispa Fukuoka	3-2
38	2002.10.19	Niigata City Athletic Stadium	Albirex Niigata	0-5
39	2002.10.23	Mitsuzawa Stadium	Omiya Ardija	1-1
40	2002.10.26	Ōita (ja:大分市営陸上競技場)	Oita Trinita	0-1
41	2002.11.2	Mitsuzawa Stadium	Cerezo Osaka	2-6
42	2002.11.9	Hiratsuka Athletics Stadium	Shonan Bellmare	1-3
43	2002.11.16	Mitsuzawa Stadium	Montedio Yamagata	2-2
44	2002.11.24	Kose Sports Stadium	Ventforet Kofu	1-0

=== Emperor's Cup ===
Match	Date	Venue	Opponents	Score
1st round	2002..			-
2nd round	2002..			-
3rd round	2002..			-

== Player statistics ==
No.	Pos.	Player	D.o.B. (Age)	Height / Weight	J.League 2		Emperor's Cup		Total	
No.	Pos.	Player	D.o.B. (Age)	Height / Weight	Apps	Goals	Apps	Goals	Apps	Goals
1	GK	Hiroki Mizuhara	January 15, 1975 (aged 27)	cm / kg	39	0				
2	DF	Yukinori Shigeta	July 15, 1976 (aged 25)	cm / kg	26	2				
3	DF	Kohei Usui	July 16, 1979 (aged 22)	cm / kg	32	1				
4	DF	Tomohide Nakazawa	September 13, 1980 (aged 21)	cm / kg	9	0				
5	DF	Shingo Morita	December 9, 1978 (aged 23)	cm / kg	20	3				
6	DF	Hiroaki Kumon	October 20, 1966 (aged 35)	cm / kg	21	0				
7	MF	Yoshikazu Goto	February 20, 1964 (aged 38)	cm / kg	32	0				
8	MF	Tsuyoshi Yoshitake	September 8, 1981 (aged 20)	cm / kg	41	2				
9	FW	Kenji Arima	November 26, 1972 (aged 29)	cm / kg	25	2				
10	FW	Masami Sato	August 26, 1981 (aged 20)	cm / kg	26	1				
11	MF	Kosaku Masuda	April 30, 1976 (aged 25)	cm / kg	23	1				
12	GK	Akihiro Yoshida	May 28, 1975 (aged 26)	cm / kg	5	0				
13	MF	Hirotoshi Yokoyama	May 9, 1975 (aged 26)	cm / kg	2	0				
14	MF	Yuji Hironaga	July 25, 1975 (aged 26)	cm / kg	32	5				
15	FW	Hiroaki Tajima	June 27, 1974 (aged 27)	cm / kg	35	5				
16	FW	Takuya Jinno	June 1, 1970 (aged 31)	cm / kg	40	8				
17	FW	Tomotaka Kitamura	May 27, 1982 (aged 19)	cm / kg	19	2				
18	FW	Shingi Ono	April 9, 1974 (aged 27)	cm / kg	42	8				
19	FW	Masato Ishida	April 17, 1983 (aged 18)	cm / kg	18	2				
20	DF	Tamotsu Komatsuzaki	July 10, 1970 (aged 31)	cm / kg	5	0				
21	GK	Satoshi Watanabe	June 8, 1982 (aged 19)	cm / kg	0	0				
22	MF	Tomoya Uchida	July 10, 1983 (aged 18)	cm / kg	10	0				
23	MF	Tomoyoshi Ono	August 12, 1979 (aged 22)	cm / kg	14	0				
24	DF	Shinya Sakoi	May 8, 1977 (aged 24)	cm / kg	42	0				
25	DF	Mikio Manaka	May 22, 1969 (aged 32)	cm / kg	19	0				
26	DF	Takafumi Yoshimoto	May 13, 1978 (aged 23)	cm / kg	14	1				
27	MF	Koji Nakao	September 8, 1981 (aged 20)	cm / kg	7	0				
28	DF	Fernando Moner	December 30, 1967 (aged 34)	cm / kg	11	0				

== Other pages ==
- (in Japanese) J. League official site
