= Shoji Jo =

Japanese footballer (born 1975)

Shoji Jo 城 彰二
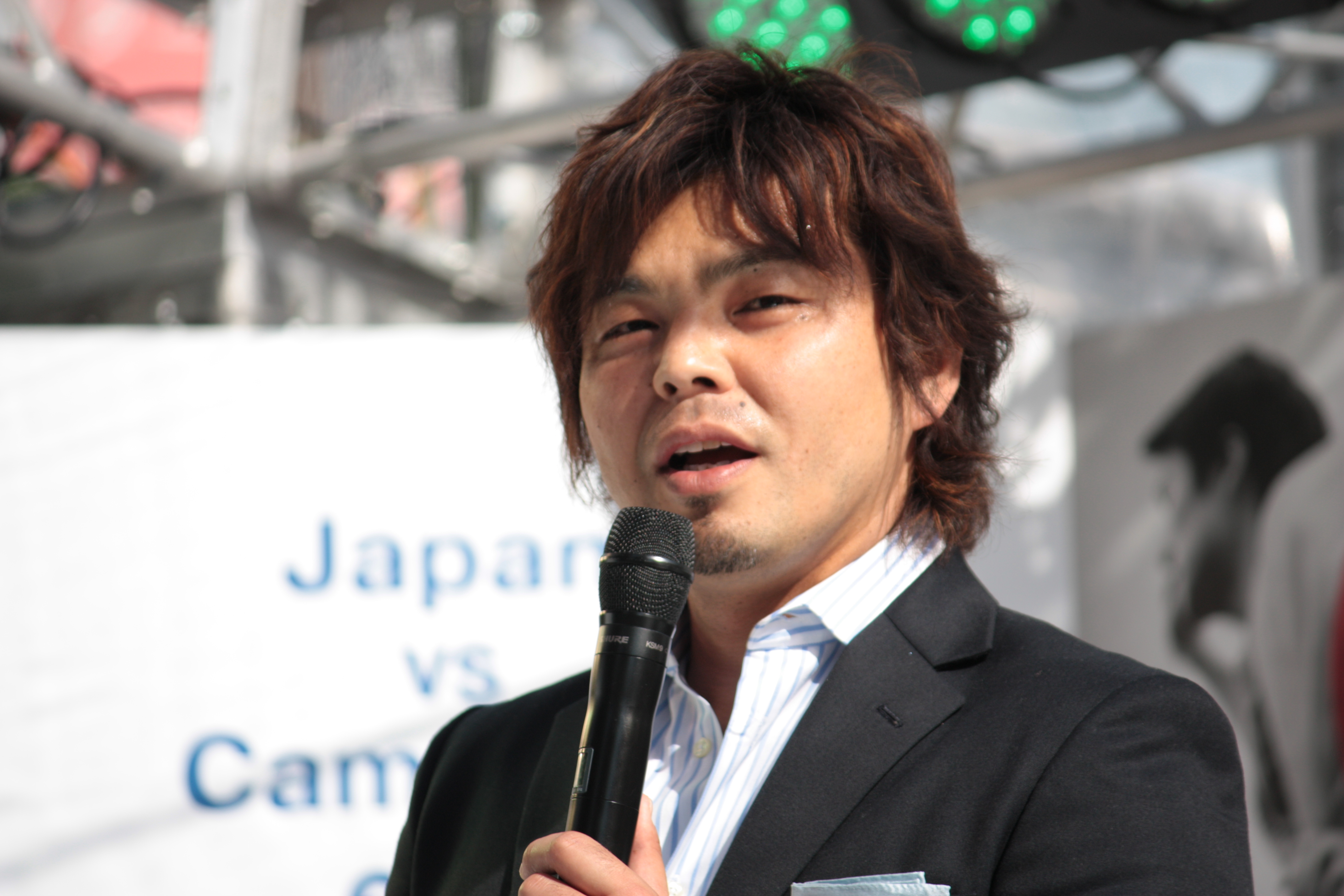

Personal information
- Date of birth: 17 June 1975 (age 51)
- Place of birth: Muroran, Hokkaido, Japan
- Height: 1.79 m (5 ft 10 in)
- Position: Forward

Youth career
- 1983–1987: Muroran Nakajima Asahigaoka SSS
- 1988: Shoyo Junior High School
- 1988–1990: Kajiki Junior High School
- 1991–1993: Kagoshima Jitsugyo High School

Senior career*
Years	Team	Apps	(Gls)
1994–1996	JEF United Ichihara	99	(35)
1997–2001	Yokohama F. Marinos	106	(59)
1999–2000	→ Real Valladolid (loan)	15	(2)
2002	Vissel Kobe	25	(1)
2003–2006	Yokohama FC	151	(44)
Total		396	(141)

International career
1996	Japan U-23	3	(0)
1995–2001	Japan	35	(7)
Medal record
Yokohama F. Marinos
Runner-up	J1 League	2000
Winner	J.League Cup	2001
- * Club domestic league appearances and goals

Shoji Jo (城 彰二, Jō Shōji; born 17 June 1975) is a Japanese former professional footballer who played as a forward. He played for the Japan national team.

== Club career ==
He was born on the island of Hokkaido and began his footballing career with JEF United Ichihara in 1994. He quickly established himself, scoring twelve goals in his first season; he scored his first goal on his debut against Gamba Osaka on 12 March.

After three seasons with JEF United Ichihara, Jo moved to the Yokohama Marinos (later Yokohama F. Marinos) in 1997. His performances in the 1998–99 season led to a loan move to the Spanish Primera División team Real Valladolid. He failed to make an impact with the club, making just 15 appearances and scoring two goals before sustaining a knee injury. After his return to Japan, Jo struggled to reestablish himself as a regular goal scorer with the Marinos and Vissel Kobe, with whom he joined in 2002. He joined Yokohama FC in 2003, where he scored 12 goals in his first season with them. He helped his club to become J2 Champions in 2006 gained and promotion to J1, but he retired from playing after that season.

== International career ==
On 20 September 1995, Jo debuted for the Japan national team against Paraguay.

He made his first appearance in an international competition with the Japan U-23 national team in the 1996 Summer Olympics.

In October 1996, he played for the Japan senior team for the first time in a year. He also played at the 1996 Asian Cup in December. After the 1998 World Cup qualification in 1997, Japan qualified for the 1998 World Cup for the first time in their history. He played at the 1998 World Cup and the 1999 Copa América. He played all matches in both competitions. He played 35 games and scored 7 goals for Japan until 2001.

== Career statistics ==
=== Club ===
Appearances and goals by club, season and competition
Club	Season	League			National cup (Note: Includes Emperor's Cup, Copa del Rey)		League cup (Note: Includes J.League Cup)		Total	
Club	Season	Division	Apps	Goals	Apps	Goals	Apps	Goals	Apps	Goals
JEF United Ichihara	1994	J1 League	33	12	2	0	2	1	37	13
JEF United Ichihara	1995	J1 League	43	14	0	0	–		43	14
JEF United Ichihara	1996	J1 League	23	9	1	0	13	4	37	13
JEF United Ichihara	Total		99	35	3	0	15	5	117	40
Yokohama F. Marinos (Note: "Yokohama Marinos" until 1999)	1997	J1 League	21	12	2	2	0	0	23	14
Yokohama F. Marinos	1998	J1 League	31	25	1	0	0	0	32	25
Yokohama F. Marinos	1999	J1 League	25	18	3	1	6	3	34	22
Yokohama F. Marinos	2000	J1 League	4	2	0	0	0	0	4	2
Yokohama F. Marinos	2001	J1 League	25	2	1	0	8	4	34	6
Yokohama F. Marinos	Total		106	59	7	3	14	7	127	69
Real Valladolid (loan)	1999–2000	La Liga	15	2			–		15	2
Vissel Kobe	2002	J1 League	25	1	1	0	6	2	32	3
Yokohama FC	2003	J2 League	33	12	1	4	–		34	16
Yokohama FC	2004	J2 League	35	8	2	0	–		37	8
Yokohama FC	2005	J2 League	40	12	1	0	–		41	12
Yokohama FC	2006	J2 League	43	12	0	0	–		43	12
Yokohama FC	Total		151	44	4	4	0	0	155	48
Career total			396	141	15	7	35	14	446	162

=== International ===
Appearances and goals by national team and year
National team	Year	Apps	Goals
Japan	1995	1	0
Japan	1996	3	0
Japan	1997	13	4
Japan	1998	10	1
Japan	1999	5	0
Japan	2000	2	2
Japan	2001	1	0
Total		35	7

Scores and results list Japan's goal tally first, score column indicates score after each Jo goal.

List of international goals scored by Shoji Jo
No.	Date	Venue	Opponent	Score	Result	Competition
1	9 February 1997	Bangkok, Thailand	Thailand	1–0	1–1	1997 King's Cup
2	27 March 1997	Muscat, Oman	Nepal	1–0	6–0	1998 FIFA World Cup qualification (AFC first round)
3	7 September 1997	Tokyo, Japan	Uzbekistan	4–0	6–3	1998 FIFA World Cup qualification (AFC final round)
4	16 November 1997	Johor Bahru, Malaysia	Iran	2–2	3–2	1998 FIFA World Cup Qualification (AFC play-off)
5	1 March 1998	Yokohama, Japan	South Korea	2–1	2–1	1998 Dynasty Cup
6	6 June 2000	Casablanca, Morocco	Jamaica	1–0	4–0	2000 King Hassan II International Cup Tournament
7	6 June 2000	Casablanca, Morocco	Jamaica	2–0	4–0	2000 King Hassan II International Cup Tournament
