= 2004 Yokohama FC season =

Yokohama FC
2004 season
- Manager: Pierre Littbarski
- Stadium: Yokohama Mitsuzawa Stadium
- J.League 2: 8th
- Emperor's Cup: 5th Round
- Top goalscorer: Mathieu Boots (8); Shoji Jo (8)
Home colours	Away colours

During the 2004 season, Yokohama FC competed in the J.League 2, in which they finished 8th.

== Competitions ==
Competitions	Position
J.League 2	8th / 12 clubs
Emperor's Cup	5th round

== Domestic results ==
=== J.League 2 ===
Match	Date	Venue	Opponents	Score
1	2004..			-
2	2004..			-
3	2004..			-
4	2004..			-
5	2004..			-
6	2004..			-
7	2004..			-
8	2004..			-
9	2004..			-
10	2004..			-
11	2004..			-
12	2004..			-
13	2004..			-
14	2004..			-
15	2004..			-
16	2004..			-
17	2004..			-
18	2004..			-
19	2004..			-
20	2004..			-
21	2004..			-
22	2004..			-
23	2004..			-
24	2004..			-
25	2004..			-
26	2004..			-
27	2004..			-
28	2004..			-
29	2004..			-
30	2004..			-
31	2004..			-
32	2004..			-
33	2004..			-
34	2004..			-
35	2004..			-
36	2004..			-
37	2004..			-
38	2004..			-
39	2004..			-
40	2004..			-
41	2004..			-
42	2004..			-
43	2004..			-
44	2004..			-

=== Emperor's Cup ===
Match	Date	Venue	Opponents	Score
3rd round	2004..			-
4th round	2004..			-
5th round	2004..			-

== Player statistics ==
No.	Pos.	Player	D.o.B. (Age)	Height / Weight	J.League 2		Emperor's Cup		Total	
No.	Pos.	Player	D.o.B. (Age)	Height / Weight	Apps	Goals	Apps	Goals	Apps	Goals
1	GK	Kenji Koyama	September 5, 1972 (aged 31)	cm / kg	0	0				
2	DF	Yukinori Shigeta	July 15, 1976 (aged 27)	cm / kg	1	0				
3	DF	Kohei Usui	July 16, 1979 (aged 24)	cm / kg	41	7				
4	DF	Mikio Manaka	May 22, 1969 (aged 34)	cm / kg	4	0				
5	DF	Tomonobu Hayakawa	July 11, 1977 (aged 26)	cm / kg	39	3				
6	DF	Mathieu Boots	June 23, 1975 (aged 28)	cm / kg	40	8				
7	MF	Tomoyoshi Ono	August 12, 1979 (aged 24)	cm / kg	16	1				
8	MF	Tsuyoshi Yoshitake	September 8, 1981 (aged 22)	cm / kg	9	0				
9	FW	Jefferson	July 3, 1981 (aged 22)	cm / kg	11	2				
10	MF	Tomoya Uchida	July 10, 1983 (aged 20)	cm / kg	39	3				
11	MF	Kosaku Masuda	April 30, 1976 (aged 27)	cm / kg	14	0				
12	GK	Takahiro Shibasaki	May 23, 1982 (aged 21)	cm / kg	1	0				
13	MF	Hirotoshi Yokoyama	May 9, 1975 (aged 28)	cm / kg	12	0				
14	DF	Jungo Kono	July 9, 1982 (aged 21)	cm / kg	18	0				
15	DF	Steven Tweed	August 8, 1972 (aged 31)	cm / kg	39	3				
16	FW	Michiharu Sugimoto	June 17, 1981 (aged 22)	cm / kg	28	0				
17	FW	Tomotaka Kitamura	May 27, 1982 (aged 21)	cm / kg	30	2				
18	MF	Shingi Ono	April 9, 1974 (aged 29)	cm / kg	42	0				
19	DF	Shunsuke Mori	April 29, 1984 (aged 19)	cm / kg	0	0				
20	FW	Tetsuya Ōkubo	March 9, 1980 (aged 24)	cm / kg	17	1				
21	GK	Takanori Sugeno	May 3, 1984 (aged 19)	cm / kg	43	1				
22	FW	Satoshi Ōtomo	October 1, 1981 (aged 22)	cm / kg	33	0				
23	DF	Kazuya Iwakura	April 26, 1985 (aged 18)	cm / kg	2	0				
24	MF	Sosuke Morito	July 8, 1985 (aged 18)	cm / kg	0	0				
25	FW	Shoji Jo	June 17, 1975 (aged 28)	cm / kg	35	8				
26	DF	Mitsunori Yamao	April 13, 1973 (aged 30)	cm / kg	39	1				
27	DF	Takanori Nakajima	February 9, 1984 (aged 20)	cm / kg	36	0				
28	FW	Yasuo Manaka	January 31, 1971 (aged 33)	cm / kg	13	1				
29	FW	Manabu Kubota	June 27, 1981 (aged 22)	cm / kg	4	0				

== Other pages ==
- (in Japanese) J. League official site
