= Masami Sato =

Japanese footballer

Masami Sato 佐藤 正美
Personal information
- Full name: Masami Sato
- Date of birth: August 26, 1981 (age 45)
- Place of birth: Kanagawa, Japan
- Height: 1.78 m (5 ft 10 in)
- Position: Forward

Youth career
- 1997–1999: Maebashi Ikuei High School

Senior career*
Years	Team	Apps	(Gls)
2000–2003	Yokohama FC	70	(6)
2003	Yokogawa Musashino	9	(3)
2004–2007	Thespa Kusatsu	96	(17)
Total		175	(26)
- * Club domestic league appearances and goals

Masami Sato (佐藤 正美, Satō Masami; born August 26, 1981) is a former Japanese football player.

== Playing career ==
Sato was born in Kanagawa Prefecture on August 26, 1981. After graduating from high school, he joined Japan Football League (JFL) club Yokohama FC in 2000. Although he could not play many matches, Yokohama FC won the champions in 2000 season and was promoted to J2 League. He played many matches from 2001. In September 2003, he moved to JFL club Yokogawa Musashino. In 2004, he moved to JFL club Thespa Kusatsu. He became a regular player and Thespa was promoted to J2 end of 2004 season. Although he played many matches until 2006, his opportunity to play decreased in 2007 and he retired end of 2007 season.

== Club statistics ==
Club performance			League		Cup		League Cup		Total	
Season	Club	League	Apps	Goals	Apps	Goals	Apps	Goals	Apps	Goals
Japan			League		Emperor's Cup		J.League Cup		Total	
2000	Yokohama FC	Football League	6	0	2	1	-		8	1
2001	Yokohama FC	J2 League	22	3	3	3	4	1	29	7
2002	Yokohama FC	J2 League	26	1	1	1	-		27	2
2003	Yokohama FC	J2 League	16	2	0	0	-		16	2
2003	Yokogawa Musashino	Football League	9	3	0	0	-		9	3
2004	Thespa Kusatsu	Football League	30	9	5	2	-		35	11
2005	Thespa Kusatsu	J2 League	27	5	2	2	-		29	7
2006	Thespa Kusatsu	J2 League	27	2	2	0	-		29	2
2007	Thespa Kusatsu	J2 League	12	1	2	0	-		14	1
Career total			175	26	17	9	4	1	196	36
