= Tamotsu Komatsuzaki =

Japanese footballer

Tamotsu Komatsuzaki 小松崎 保
Personal information
- Full name: Tamotsu Komatsuzaki
- Date of birth: July 10, 1970 (age 56)
- Place of birth: Chiba, Japan
- Height: 1.73 m (5 ft 8 in)
- Position: Defender

Youth career
- 1986–1988: Yachiyo High School
- 1989–1992: Juntendo University

Senior career*
Years	Team	Apps	(Gls)
1993–1999	Kawasaki Frontale	107	(0)
2000	Consadole Sapporo	8	(0)
2001–2002	Yokohama FC	28	(0)
Total		143	(0)
- * Club domestic league appearances and goals

Tamotsu Komatsuzaki (小松崎 保, Komatsuzaki Tamotsu; born July 10, 1970) is a former Japanese football player.

== Playing career ==
Komatsuzaki was born in Chiba Prefecture on July 10, 1970. After graduating from Juntendo University, he joined the Japan Football League club Fujitsu (later Kawasaki Frontale) in 1993. He played many matches as center back during his first season. However, he did not play as much in 1997. Although the club was promoted to the J2 League in 1999, he was not put into play. In 2000, he moved to the J2 club Consadole Sapporo. However he did not play much. In 2001, he moved to the newly promoted J2 League club, Yokohama FC. Although he played often as a center back in 2001, he was not played in 2002 and retired at the end of the 2002 season.

== Career statistics ==
Appearances and goals by club, season and competition
Club	Season	League			Emperor's Cup		J.League Cup		Total	
Club	Season	Division	Apps	Goals	Apps	Goals	Apps	Goals	Apps	Goals
Fujitsu	1993	Football League	16	0	—		—		16	0
Fujitsu	1994	Football League	20	0	—		—		20	0
Fujitsu	1995	Football League	27	0	1	0	—		28	0
Fujitsu	1996	Football League	30	0	4	0	—		34	0
Kawasaki Frontale	1997	Football League	11	0	3	0	—		14	0
Kawasaki Frontale	1998	Football League	2	0	3	0	1	0	6	0
Kawasaki Frontale	1999	J2 League	1	0	0	0	0	0	1	0
Consadole Sapporo	2000	J2 League	8	0	0	0	1	0	9	0
Yokohama FC	2001	J2 League	23	0	4	1	0	0	27	1
Yokohama FC	2002	J2 League	5	0	0	0	—		5	0
Career total			143	0	15	1	2	0	160	1
