= Shinya Sakoi =

Japanese footballer

Shinya Sakoi 迫井 深也
Personal information
- Full name: Shinya Sakoi
- Date of birth: May 8, 1977 (age 49)
- Place of birth: Hiroshima, Japan
- Height: 1.78 m (5 ft 10 in)
- Position: Defender

Youth career
- 1993–1995: Shimizu Higashi High School
- 1996–1999: Juntendo University

Senior career*
Years	Team	Apps	(Gls)
2000–2005	FC Tokyo	8	(0)
2001–2002	→ Yokohama FC (loan)	59	(0)
2004	→Montedio Yamagata (loan)	24	(0)
Total		91	(0)
- * Club domestic league appearances and goals

Shinya Sakoi (迫井 深也, Sakoi Shinya; born May 8, 1977) is a former Japanese football player.

== Playing career ==
Sakoi was born in Hiroshima Prefecture on May 8, 1977. After graduating from Juntendo University, he joined newly was promoted to J1 League club, FC Tokyo in 2000. He played several matches as defensive midfielder in first season. However he could not play at all in the match in 2001. In July 2001, he moved to J2 League club Yokohama FC on loan. He became a regular player as center back immediately and played many matches until 2002. In 2003, he returned to FC Tokyo. However he could not play at all in the match. In 2004, he moved to J2 club Montedio Yamagata on loan. He became a regular player as right side back from summer. In 2005, he returned to FC Tokyo. Although he played several matches, he could hardly play in the match and retired at the end of the 2005 season.

== Career statistics ==
Appearances and goals by club, season and competition
Club	Season	League			Emperor's Cup		J.League Cup		Total	
Club	Season	Division	Apps	Goals	Apps	Goals	Apps	Goals	Apps	Goals
FC Tokyo	2000	J1 League	4	0	1	0	2	0	7	0
FC Tokyo	2001	J1 League	0	0	0	0	0	0	0	0
Yokohama FC	2001	J2 League	17	0	4	0	0	0	21	0
Yokohama FC	2002	J2 League	42	0	3	0	—		45	0
FC Tokyo	2003	J1 League	0	0	0	0	0	0	0	0
Montedio Yamagata	2004	J2 League	24	0	2	0	—		26	0
FC Tokyo	2005	J1 League	4	0	0	0	0	0	4	0
Career total			91	0	10	0	2	0	103	0
