= Kokushikan University SC =

Japanese football club

Kokushikan University F.C.
- Full name: Kokushikan University; Football Club
- Founded: 1956; 70 years ago
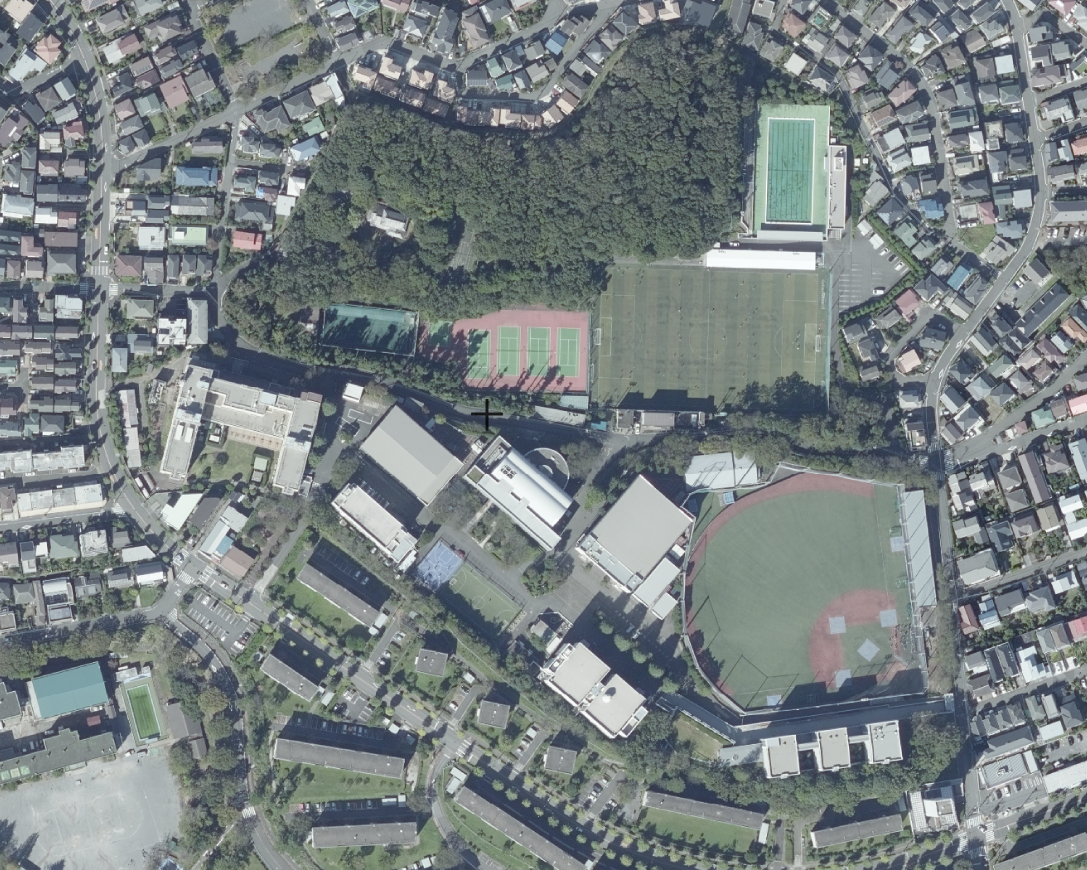
- Ground: Tokyo, Japan

Kokushikan University Football Club is a Japanese football club based in Tokyo. The club has played in Japan Football League.
