= ALO's Hokuriku =

ALO's Hokuriku アローズ北陸
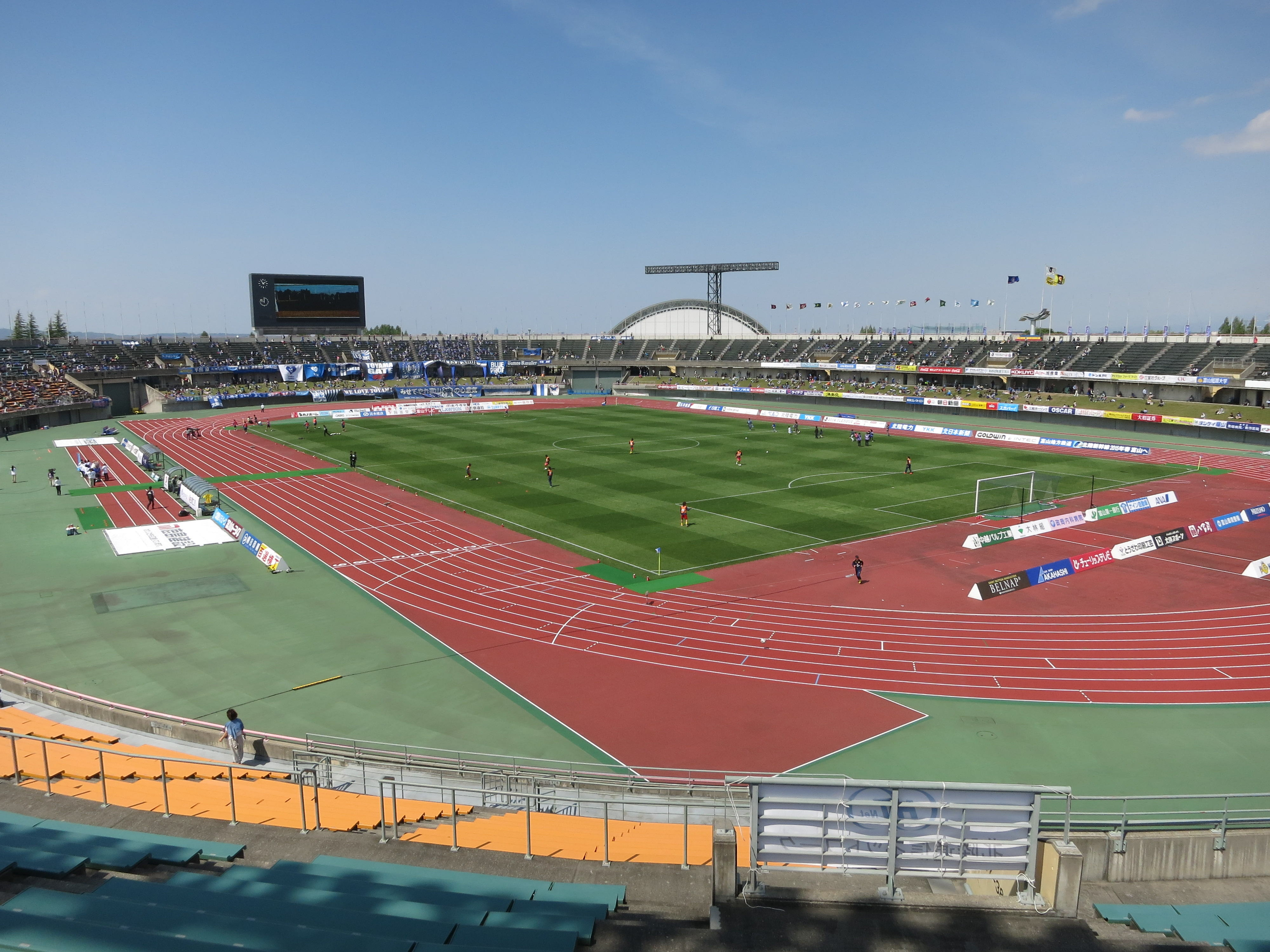
- Full name: Hokuriku Denryoku Football Club; ALO's Hokuriku
- Nickname: ALO's
- Founded: 1990
- Dissolved: 2007
- Ground: Toyama Athletic Recreation Park Stadium; Toyama, Toyama
- Capacity: 28,494
- League: Japan Football League
- 2007: 4th
Home colours	Away colours

ALO's Hokuriku (アローズ北陸, Arōzu Hokuriku) was a Japanese football club based in Toyama, the capital city of Toyama Prefecture. They played in the Japan Football League, and their team colour was blue.

Their nickname ALO's derives from Antelopes. Hokuriku refers to the region that includes Toyama and its neighbouring prefectures.

== History ==
=== As an amateur team ===
The club was founded as Hokuriku Electric Power Company's football club in 1990. They changed their name to ALO's Hokuriku to show their intention to be more community-oriented in 1996, although the company still control the club (thus rendering it ineligible for promotion to the J. League, regardless of results). They have been playing in the JFL since 2000. Since they were in regional league, YKK AP F.C. had been the biggest rival all the time as they have to compete for the right to participate in Emperor's Cup as the representative of Toyama.

=== Merger as a professional team ===
On September 10, 2007, Hokuriku Electric Power Company and YKK agreed with merging their teams to aim promotion to the J. League, the national supreme football league in Japan, in response to an eager request by Toyama Football Association (TFA). According to local broadcasting company Tulip TV, over 20 companies informally promised to invest in the new team. In the media briefing, Governor of Toyama Prefecture also participated.

TFA has founded an organization named "Civic Soccer Club Team of Toyama Prefecture (富山県民サッカークラブチーム)" with two major economic organization and representatives of Hokuriku Electric Power Company and YKK. The Japan Football League confirmed that the merged club would compete in the JFL from the 2008 season. The new merged club is named as Kataller Toyama and ALO's Hokuriku ceased to exist.

== Stadiums ==
They played their home games at Toyama Athletic Recreation Park Stadium, as well as Toyama Iwase Sports Park Ball Game Stadium and Toyama Gofuku Park Athletic Stadium. They also played one game each per season in adjoining Ishikawa Prefecture and Fukui Prefecture.

== Results in JFL ==
2000: 8th
2001: 15th
2002: 14th
2003: 14th
2004: 10th
2005: 3rd
2006: 8th
2007: 4th
