= 1999 Japan Football League =

Japan Football League
- Season: 1999
- Dates: 18 April – 7 November
- Champions: Yokohama FC; 1st JFL title 1st D3 title
- Promoted: Mito HollyHock
- Matches played: 108
- Goals scored: 386 (3.57 per match)
- Top goalscorer: Marcus (22 goals total)
- Highest attendance: 11,283 (Round 2, Yokohama vs. Jatco)
- Lowest attendance: 113 (Round 4, Kokushikan vs. Jatco)
- Average attendance: 1,084

The 1999 Japan Football League (Japanese: 第1回日本フットボールリーグ, Hepburn: Dai Ikkai Nihon Futtobōru Rīgu) was the first season of the Japan Football League, the third tier of the Japanese football league system.

== Overview ==
1999 JFL teams

After the dissolution of former Japan Football League in order to form J. League Division 2, the new Japan Football League was established from this season as the nationwide top division for amateur clubs. It was originally planned to have 8 clubs, including seven former JFL clubs and Yokogawa Electric, promoted from Kantō Soccer League, one of nine Japanese Regional Leagues. But it eventually became nine-club structure by accepting Yokohama FC, which was established by supporters of defunct Yokohama Flügels, as an associate member as an extralegal measures. Nine clubs played 24 matches each, in triple round-robin format. Yokohama F.C. won the championship but under the conditions of their associate membership were not eligible to promotion and had to stay in JFL for the next year.

== Table ==
Pos	Team	Pld	W	OTW	D	L	GF	GA	GD	Pts	Promotion
1	Yokohama FC (C)	24	16	2	3	3	57	32	+25	55	
2	Honda Motor (Note: Occupied one of the top three places at the end of the first part of the season (9th week) and were seeded for 1999 Emperor's Cup. These clubs were automatically qualified for the tournament, while each of other JFL clubs had to go through the prefectural qualifier. Yokohama F.C. and Kokushikan University were not eligible to be seeded.)	24	13	5	1	5	69	34	+35	50	
3	Mito HollyHock (P)	24	13	3	0	8	48	32	+16	45	Promotion to 2000 J. League Division 2 (Note: Though Mito HollyHock haven't finished within top two, their promotion was unanimously accepted by the special J. League Board decision. The fact that championship has been won by associate JFL members, Yokohama F.C., was taken into account.)
4	Denso SC	24	8	3	4	9	46	38	+8	34	
5	Sony Sendai	24	7	2	1	14	29	42	−13	26	
6	Otsuka Pharmaceuticals	24	7	1	2	14	35	47	−12	25	
7	Jatco SC	24	6	2	3	13	40	53	−13	25	
8	Yokogawa Electric	24	6	1	0	17	26	42	−16	20	
9	Kokushikan University	24	4	2	0	18	36	65	−29	16	

Updated to match(es) played on 7 November 1999. Source: Japan Football League
Rules for classification: 1) points; 2) goal difference; 3) number of goals scored.
(C) Champion; (P) Promoted

== Results ==
Round 1

Home \ Away	DEN	HOL	HON	JAT	KSU	OTP	SON	YEL	YFC
Denso SC			2–4		3–1		0–0^{OT}	3–1	1–1^{OT}
Mito HollyHock	0–3		1–2^{OT}		1–0				
Honda Motors				6–4		3–2	1–2	2–0	3–4
Jatco SC	2–1^{OT}	2–3^{OT}							
Kokushikan University			0–5	0–3		0–1	1–3		
Otsuka Pharmaceuticals	3–2	1–0		2–0				0–1	1–4
Sony Sendai		0–4		2–3		1–0^{OT}		0–1	
Yokogawa Electric		0–1^{OT}		2–1	2–1^{OT}				
Yokohama FC		4–1		2–2^{OT}	5–2		1–0	4–0	

Updated to match(es) played on 13 June 1999. Source: Japan Football League
Legend: Blue = home team win; Yellow = draw; Red = away team win.

Round 2

Home \ Away	DEN	HOL	HON	JAT	KSU	OTP	SON	YEL	YFC
Denso SC			0–4				3–0	1–0	2–2^{OT}
Mito HollyHock	2–1		2–1		4–3	4–0			
Honda Motors					1–2	8–2	4–1		2–0
Jatco SC	0–4	0–5	1–3						2–3
Kokushikan University	1–3			1–0^{OT}		1–2^{OT}	2–1		
Otsuka Pharmaceuticals	1–2^{OT}			1–1^{OT}				2–0	2–3
Sony Sendai		0–1		1–3		1–3		3–1	
Yokogawa Electric		0–1	1–2	0–2	3–4^{OT}				
Yokohama FC		3–2			4–3^{OT}		1–0	2–1	

Updated to match(es) played on 15 August 1999. Source: Japan Football League
Legend: Blue = home team win; Yellow = draw; Red = away team win.

Round 3

Home \ Away	DEN	HOL	HON	JAT	KSU	OTP	SON	YEL	YFC
Denso SC		3–2^{OT}		0–0^{OT}		1–0^{OT}			
Mito HollyHock				2–1		3–2^{OT}	4–1	1–0	2–0
Honda Motors	1–0^{OT}	2–1^{OT}		2–1^{OT}	4–3^{OT}				
Jatco SC					5–3	2–1^{OT}	1–5	2–1	
Kokushikan University	5–4	3–1						0–3	0–3
Otsuka Pharmaceuticals			2–2^{OT}		3–0		2–3^{OT}		
Sony Sendai	3–2		0–1		1–0				1–0
Yokogawa Electric	2–3		1–5			3–2	3–0		0–1
Yokohama FC	3–2		2–1	3–2^{OT}		2–0			

Updated to match(es) played on 7 November 1999. Source: Japan Football League
Legend: Blue = home team win; Yellow = draw; Red = away team win.

== Top scorers ==
Rank	Scorer	Club	Goals
1	(Brazil) Marcus	Honda Motors	22
2	(Japan) Kenji Arima	Yokohama FC	19
3	(Japan) Mitsunori Yabuta	Yokohama FC	12
4	(Japan) Hiroyasu Ibata	Honda Motors	11
4	(Japan) Hiroaki Tajima	Honda Motors	11

== Attendances ==
Pos	Team	Total	High	Low	Average	Change
1	Yokohama FC	53,045	11,283	1,494	4,080	−74.3%^{†}
2	Honda Motors	14,733	3,109	283	1,133	+62.1%
3	Mito HollyHock	10,695	2,531	412	891	+16.6%
4	Sony Sendai	7,833	2,109	329	653	−57.5%
5	Jatco SC	6,198	1,809	362	620	+5.3%
6	Yokogawa Electric	7,194	1,556	268	600	n/a^{‡}
7	Otsuka Pharmaceuticals	6,803	2,039	172	567	−4.7%
8	Denso SC	6,270	1,372	211	523	+28.5%
9	Kokushikan University	4,253	2,099	113	354	0.0%
	League total	117,024	11,283	113	1,084	−39.7%

Source: Japan Football League
Notes:
^{†} The club was created by the supporters of disbanded J. League club Yokohama Flügels – therefore attendances are compared to Flügels' last record in J. League.
^{‡} Team played previous season in Regional Leagues.

== Promotion and relegation ==
No relegation has occurred because the league was expanding to 12 teams. At the end of the season, the winner and runner-up of the Regional League promotion series, ALO's Hokuriku and Tochigi SC were promoted automatically. In addition, FC Kyoken and Shizuoka Sangyo University were included by JFA and College FA recommendations.
