= Japanese football league system =

Football league system of Japan

- Country: Japan
- Sport: Association football
- Promotion and relegation: Yes

National system
- Federation: Japan Football Association
- Confederation: AFC
- Top division: J1 League (men); WE League (women)
- Second division: J2 League (men); Nadeshiko League (Div. 1) (women)
- Cup competition: Men: Emperor's Cup; J.League Cup; Women: Empress' Cup; WE League Cup

The Japanese football league system is a series of interconnected leagues for men's association football clubs in Japan. It is organized in a pyramidal shape similar to football league systems in many other countries around the world. The leagues are bound by the principle of promotion and relegation; however, there are stringent criteria for promotion from the JFL to J3, which demands a club being backed by the town itself including the local government, a community of fans and corporate sponsors rather than a parent company or a corporation.

== Overview ==
The top three levels of the Japanese football league system are operated by the J. League, which consists of J1 League (J1), J2 League, and J3 League. All of the clubs in the J. League are fully professional.

The fourth level, the Japan Football League (JFL) is a semi-professional league consisting of amateur, professional, and company clubs from all over Japan.

At the fifth and sixth levels, nine parallel regional leagues are operated by nine different regional football associations, some of which have multiple divisions. The regional associations are divided by political or geographical boundaries.

At the seventh level and below, parallel prefectural leagues are hosted by each of the 47 different prefectural football associations, again divided by political or geographical boundaries. Some have multiple divisions.

== Men's system ==
| Level on pyramid | League(s) / division(s) | | | | | | | | |
|---|---|---|---|---|---|---|---|---|---|
| | Professional leagues Japan Professional Football League (J.League) | | | | | | | | |
| 1 | J1 League; 20 clubs ↓ 3 relegations | | | | | | | | |
| 2 | J2 League; 20 clubs ↑ 2 promotions + 4 playoffs ↓ 3 relegations | | | | | | | | |
| 3 | J3 League; 20 clubs ↑ 2 promotions + 4 playoffs ↓ 0–2 relegations | | | | | | | | |
| | Amateur leagues | | | | | | | | |
| 4 | Japan Football League (JFL); 16 clubs ↑ 0–2 promotions ↓ 0–2 relegations | | | | | | | | |
| 5–6 | Japanese Regional Leagues; 130 clubs | | | | | | | | |
| 5–6 | Hokkaido; Soccer League; 8 clubs | Tohoku; Soccer League (26); Division 1 (10) | Kantō; Soccer League (20) Division 1 (10) | Hokushinetsu; Football League (16) Division 1 (8) | Tōkai; Adult Soccer League (16); Division 1 (8) | Kansai; Soccer League (16); Division (8) | Chūgoku; Soccer League; 10 clubs | Shikoku; Soccer League; 8 clubs | Kyushu; Soccer League; 10 clubs |
| 5–6 | Hokkaido; Soccer League; 8 clubs | Tohoku; Soccer League Division 2 (16 in 2 groups) | Kantō; Soccer League Division 2 (10) | Hokushinetsu; Football League Division 2 (8) | Tōkai; Adult Soccer League Division 2 (8) | Kansai; Soccer League Division 2 (8) | Chūgoku; Soccer League; 10 clubs | Shikoku; Soccer League; 8 clubs | Kyushu; Soccer League; 10 clubs |
| 7+ | 47 Prefectural Leagues & 5 Block Leagues of Hokkaido; Many clubs – 1 promotion + 1 playoff | | | | | | | | |
| 7+ | Sapporo Block | Dōō /Dōhoku (Central and North) Blocks | Dōtō (East) Block | Dōnan (South) Block | Aomori | Iwate | Miyagi | Akita | Yamagata | Fukushima | Ibaraki | Tochigi | Gunma | Saitama | Chiba | Tokyo | Kanagawa | Yamanashi | Niigata | Toyama | Ishikawa | Fukui | Nagano | Gifu | Shizuoka | Aichi | Mie | Shiga | Kyoto | Osaka | Hyogo | Nara | Wakayama | Tottori | Shimane | Okayama | Hiroshima | Yamaguchi | Tokushima | Kagawa | Ehime | Kochi | Fukuoka | Saga | Nagasaki | Kumamoto | Ōita | Miyazaki | Kagoshima | Okinawa |

== Structure ==
=== Level I, II & III: J. League ===
J. League governs the top three levels of the Japanese football pyramid and comprises a total of 60 clubs, all of which are fully professional and are divided into three divisions, J1 League (J1), J2 League (J2) and J3 League (J3). Eighteen (18) clubs make up the top flight and have access to the Asian premier football competition, AFC Champions League. Division 2 now has 22 clubs, after 2 new clubs were promoted into the system in 2012. Division 3 now has 20 clubs, after 2 new clubs were promoted into the system in 2023. From the 2024 season, the three J. League Divisions consist of 20 teams.

All J. League clubs enter the Emperor's Cup directly and receive a bye in the 1st round, but only the Division 1 clubs qualify for the J. League Cup until 2023. In the past, J1 teams started from the fourth round and J2 teams started from the third round. Nowadays, they all start from the second round due to the expansion of J2, this results in some eliminations of professional teams by regional teams in the early stages.

==== Level I: J1 League (20 clubs) ====
Asian qualification
Currently, through the league games, the J. League champions, runners-up, and third-placed teams qualify for the AFC Champions League. The other means of qualification is the Emperor's Cup; however this also gives clubs below level I the possibility of qualification (if they hold a J1 and AFC club license). If one of the top three finishers also wins the Emperor's Cup title, the 4th-placed club receives the final qualification spot.

Relegation (to J2)
From 2024 season, the bottom three clubs (18th, 19th and 20th) are automatically relegated to J2 League. Until 2022 season, the 17th and 18th positions were automatically demoted and the 16th position was relegated when losing to the J2 team winner of the J1 promotion playoffs. For 2023, 18th position was automatically relegated and j2 went back to 20 clubs from 2024 after the expansion in 2021.

==== Level II: J2 League (20 clubs) ====
Promotion (to J1)
There are three promotion spots available to clubs in J2. The champions and runners-up receive automatic promotion and the clubs finishing 3rd to 6th participate in playoffs for the remaining promotion spot. To be promoted, a club is obliged to meet all the criteria required for membership of Division 1, although no club in the past has been denied promotion for failing to meet the requirements.

Relegation (to J3)
Up to two of the top J3 clubs may be promoted to J2 if they have a J. League Associate Membership. Subsequently, up to two of the bottom J2 clubs might be relegated to J3. From 2024, three lower teams have been automatically relegated to J3.

==== Level III: J3 League (20 clubs) ====
Rules for promotion to J2 is largely similar to those of Japan Football League in the recent seasons: to be promoted, a club must hold a J2 license and finish in top 2 of the league. Until the 2016 season, the champions were promoted directly, in exchange with the 22nd-placed J2 club; and the runners-up participated in the playoffs with the 21st J2 club. Currently, the champions and runners-up receive automatic promotion. If either or both top 2 finishers are ineligible for promotion, the playoffs and/or direct exchange is not held in accordance to the exact positions of promotion-eligible clubs. Until 2022, there was no relegation system from J3 League other than withdrawal from the J. League due to non-issuance of a license. In November 2021, J.League Chairman Murai announced that promotion from and relegation to the JFL was planned for the 2023 season.

Promotion (to J2)
There are three promotion spots available to clubs in J3. From 2024, two top teams have been automatically promoted, 3rd to 6th place face promotion play-off to J2.
Relegation (to JFL)
Relegation from J3 to JFL was introduced for the 2023 season, after 2022 did not feature relegation.

In early January 2023, the J.League published details of the J3–JFL promotion/relegation playoffs, enabling the possibility for teams to be relegated from the J3. The system of promotion and relegation between the J3 and the JFL can be determined by the eligibility (promotion to J3 requires a J.League license) of the JFL's champions and runners-up for the season.

- If only the JFL champions hold a license, they replace automatically the J3's 20th-placed team.
- If only the JFL runners-up hold a license, there are promotion/relegation playoffs with the J3's 20th-placed team.
- If both the JFL champions and runners-up hold licenses, there will be automatic exchange between the JFL champions and the J3's 20th-placed team, and the runners-up compete in two-legged playoffs with the J3's 19th-placed team.
- If both the JFL champions and runners-up do not hold licenses, no exchange takes place; the teams placed third and below in the league standings, even if one of them holds a J3 license, are not entitled to promotion and the playoffs.

=== Level IV: Japan Football League (16 clubs) ===
The Japan Football League (JFL) is the fourth level in the Japanese football pyramid, and is known as the highest level for amateur club football. Prior to 2010, the JFL was governed by Japan Football Association (JFA); since 2010, the JFL became independent from the Japan FA with its own status and governing body, and consists mainly of amateur football clubs and company teams, though some fully professional clubs (J. League associate members) also exist. Due to presence of these professional clubs, the league has de facto semi-professional status.

Clubs at this level and below enter the Emperor's Cup indirectly; most clubs qualify through cup tournaments contested in individual prefectures; the top JFL club at the halfway point of the season may qualify directly. However, if they have also won their respective prefectural cup, the prefectural cup runners-up take their place in the indirect round.

Promotion (to J3)
Clubs in the JFL must meet following criteria to receive promotion to the professional league.

- Finish in the top two in JFL and be among promotion-eligible clubs
- Have an average attendance of more than 2,000 in the prior season, with a significant effort to achieve that average.
- Pass a final inspection by the J. League professional committee
- Have a stadium that complies with J3 standards (capacity 2,000 or above) and passes the league examination
- Make efforts to develop a stable support organization in the year immediately before joining
- Be deemed an appropriate J3 member by the board of directors based on club activities

Relegation (to Regional Leagues)
The number of relegated clubs varies from 1 to 2 depending on the outcome of a promotion/relegation series and/or the number of clubs disbanded. Depending on the number, the team ranked 16th at the end of the season is automatically relegated to its respective Regional League. The team ranked 15th has to contest that series to survive relegation. Clubs will be relegated to their designated Regional League (i.e. a club from Tokyo will be relegated to the Kanto League, even if the promoted club is not from the Kanto League).

=== Level V/VI: 9 Japanese Regional Leagues ===
In modern Japan, the whole country is divided into 9 different regions. From North to South they are Hokkaido, Touhoku, Kantou, Tokai, Hokushin-etsu (Hokuriku+Shin-etsu), Kansai, Shikoku, Chugoku, and Kyushu. Each region has its own football league, and they make up 9 parallel football leagues governed by designated regional FAs. The Hokkaido, Chugoku, Shikoku, and Kyushu Regional Leagues have only one division, whereas others have two divisions. On top of that, Touhoku Division 2 is divided into Division 2 North and Division 2 South. Because of differences in structure, each region has its own promotion and relegation regulations between the divisions.

Aside from the Emperor's Cup, clubs at this level and the levels immediately below play in the All Japan Senior Football Championship (Shakaijin Cup), qualifying through prefectural cups. Some Regional Leagues may have their own League Cups as well (Kanto, Kansai).

Promotion (to JFL)
At the end of the season, the champions and certain runners-up from the 9 Regional Leagues qualify for the Japan Regional Football Champions League. The winners of the tournament receive promotion to the JFL. The runners-up may either contest a promotion/relegation series match against the JFL club ranked 15th or receive direct promotion depending on whether any clubs have been disbanded.
Relegation (to Prefectural Leagues)
Different regulations for each Regional League.

=== Level VII+: 46 Prefectural Leagues & Hokkaido Blocks ===
Under the 9 regions, there are 47 prefectures. Hokkaido is by itself as a prefecture, thus the leagues in Hokkaido do not have a prefectural league and are rather divided into 5 blocks (North, Central, East, Sapporo, and South); however, all other 46 prefectures have Prefectural leagues. Most if not all, of these leagues have multiple divisions.

Promotion (to Regional League)
Different regulations for each Regional League.
Relegation (to Municipal Leagues)
Different regulations for each Regional League.

=== History of the Japanese league system's national tiers ===
Professional leagues (J. League)
Amateur/Semi-professional leagues

| Year | Tier 1 | Tier 2 | Tier 3 | Tier 4 |
|---|---|---|---|---|
| 1965–1971 | Japan Soccer League | | | |
| 1972–1991 | JSL Division 1 | JSL Division 2 | | |
| 1992–1993 | J. League | Old JFL Division 1 | Old JFL Division 2 | |
| 1994–1998 | J. League | Japan Football League (Old JFL) | | |
| 1999–2013 | J1 League | J2 League | New JFL | |
| 2014–present | J1 League | J2 League | J3 League | New JFL |

== Women's system ==
| Level | League/Division |
|---|---|
| | Professional leagues |
| I | WE League 12 clubs no relegation (2024–25 season) |
| | Semi-professional leagues |
| II | Nadeshiko League Division 1 (Plenus Nadeshiko League Division 1) 12 clubs ↓ 1 relegation spot + 1 promotion/relegation series spot |
| III | Nadeshiko League Division 2 (Plenus Nadeshiko League Division 2) 10 clubs ↑ 1 promotion spot + 1 promotion/relegation series spot ↓ 1 relegation spot + 1 promotion/relegation series spot |
| | Amateur leagues |
| IV-V | 9 Regional Leagues many clubs ↑ 2 promotion/relegation series spots ↓ ?? relegation spot |
| VI | 46 Prefectural Leagues & 2 Block Leagues of Hokkaido many clubs ↑ ?? promotion spot |

As of 2022–23 season, all clubs in the top two tiers enter the Empress's Cup directly, with the clubs below having to qualify through regional tournaments. The top tier clubs also qualify for the WE League Cup.

== See also ==
- Sports in Japan
  - Football in Japan
    - Women's football in Japan
- Japan Football Association (JFA)
- League system
- J.League
  - J1 League (I)
  - J2 League (II)
  - J3 League (III)
- Japan Football League (JFL) (IV)
- Regional Football Champions League (Promotion playoffs to JFL)
- Regional Leagues (V/VI)
- Fujifilm Super Cup (Super Cup)
- Emperor's Cup (National Cup)
- J.League YBC Levain Cup (League Cup)
