= 2000 Japan Football League =

Japan Football League
- Season: 2000
- Dates: 16 April – 12 November
- Champions: Yokohama FC; 2nd JFL title 2nd D3 title
- Promoted: Yokohama FC
- Matches played: 132
- Goals scored: 468 (3.55 per match)
- Top goalscorer: Kenji Arima (24 goals total)
- Highest attendance: 5,324 (Round 1, Yokohama vs. Tochigi)
- Lowest attendance: 84 (Round 17, Kokushinkan vs. ALO's)
- Average attendance: 901

The 2000 Japan Football League (Japanese: 第2回日本フットボールリーグ, Hepburn: Dai Ni-kai Nihon Futtobōru Rīgu) was the second season of the Japan Football League, the third tier of the Japanese football league system.

== Overview ==
2000 JFL teams

It was contested by 12 teams, and Yokohama FC defended their champions title.

== Table ==
Pos	Team	Pld	W	OTW	D	L	GF	GA	GD	Pts	Promotion
1	Yokohama FC (Note: Occupied one of the top three places at the end of the first half of the season (11th week) and were seeded for 2000 Emperor's Cup. These clubs were automatically qualified for the tournament, while each of other JFL clubs had to go through the prefectural qualifier.) (C, P)	22	19	1	2	0	66	24	+42	61	Promotion to 2001 J. League Division 2
2	Honda Motor	22	15	2	0	5	51	29	+22	49	
3	Denso SC	22	11	5	1	5	43	23	+20	44	
4	Otsuka Pharmaceuticals	22	12	2	0	8	57	37	+20	40	
5	Sony Sendai	22	11	2	0	9	51	37	+14	37	
6	Jatco SC	22	9	0	1	12	42	44	−2	28	
7	Kokushikan University	22	7	3	1	11	45	48	−3	28	
8	ALO's Hokuriku	22	6	2	0	14	26	49	−23	22	
9	FC Kyoken	22	4	3	1	14	20	38	−18	19	
10	Shizuoka Sangyo University	22	4	1	2	15	25	50	−25	16	
11	Tochigi SC	22	3	2	1	16	21	48	−27	14	
12	Yokogawa FC	22	2	0	3	17	21	41	−20	9	

Updated to match(es) played on November 12, 2000. Source: Japan Football League
Rules for classification: 1) points; 2) goal difference; 3) number of goals scored.
(C) Champion; (P) Promoted

== Results ==
Home \ Away	ALO	DEN	HON	JAT	KSU	KYO	OTP	SON	SSU	TOC	YOK	YFC
ALO's Hokuriku		0–1	1–2^{OT}	4–2	2–1	1–0	1–6	2–1	1–4	0–2	3–2	0–1
Denso SC	2–0		1–0^{OT}	5–1	2–1^{OT}	1–2	2–1	1–2^{OT}	2–1	2–1^{OT}	1–0	1–2^{OT}
Honda Motors	3–1	2–0		1–2	2–0	2–1^{OT}	2–1	5–1	5–0	2–0	2–1	2–7
Jatco SC	5–1	0–2	0–3		2–2^{OT}	4–0	1–3	1–0	1–2	4–3	3–2	0–1
Kokushikan University	3–2^{OT}	2–3	3–4	3–1		1–2^{OT}	1–3	4–5	2–1	2–0	2–1	1–4
FC Kyoken	1–2^{OT}	0–4	0–3	1–4	2–1		1–2^{OT}	1–2	0–1	2–1^{OT}	0–0^{OT}	0–1
Otsuka Pharmaceuticals	1–0	1–2^{OT}	3–1	4–0	2–4	3–2		2–1^{OT}	8–0	0–1	1–0	1–5
Sony Sendai	3–1	2–1^{OT}	2–3	1–0	1–2^{OT}	2–0	3–4		3–0	7–0	1–0	1–2
Shizuoka Sangyo University	5–1	1–3	1–2	1–4	1–2^{OT}	2–3^{OT}	2–1^{OT}	1–3		1–2	0–1	1–2
Tochigi SC	0–1^{OT}	0–2	0–2	0–4	2–3	0–1	2–4	0–3	0–0^{OT}		3–2^{OT}	0–1
Yokogawa FC	1–2	2–3^{OT}	1–3	2–1	1–2	0–1	0–4	1–2	0–0^{OT}	2–3^{OT}		1–3
Yokohama FC	3–0	2–2^{OT}	3–0	3–2	5–3	1–0	6–2	6–5	4–0	3–1	1–1^{OT}	

Updated to match(es) played on November 12, 2000. Source: Japan Football League
Legend: Blue = home team win; Yellow = draw; Red = away team win.

== Top scorers ==
Rank	Scorer	Club	Goals
1	(Japan) Kenji Arima	Yokohama FC	24
2	(Japan) Hidenori Tabata	Sony Sendai	19
3	(Japan) Takehiro Hayashi	Otsuka Pharmaceuticals	16
4	(Japan) Shusuke Shimada	Otsuka Pharmaceuticals	15
5	(Japan) Tatsuya Furuhashi	Honda Motors	14

== Attendances ==
Pos	Team	Total	High	Low	Average	Change
1	Yokohama FC	40,293	5,324	2,808	3,663	−10.2%
2	Sony Sendai	12,027	4,421	317	1,093	+67.4%
3	Tochigi SC	11,543	2,279	473	1,049	n/a^{†}
4	Honda Motors	10,982	3,139	438	998	−11.9%
5	Yokogawa FC	7,736	2,744	265	703	+17.2%
6	Jatco SC	7,335	2,803	210	667	+7.6%
7	Shizuoka Sangyo University	5,763	1,568	172	524	n/a^{‡}
8	Otsuka Pharmaceuticals	5,550	2,219	203	505	−10.9%
9	ALO's Hokuriku	5,320	1,602	260	484	n/a^{†}
10	Denso SC	4,760	1,168	241	433	−17.2%
11	FC Kyoken	4,246	1,080	206	386	n/a^{†}
12	Kokushikan University	3,375	1,786	84	307	−13.3%
	League total	118,930	5,324	84	901	−16.9%

Notes:
^{†} Team played previous season in Regional Leagues.
^{‡} Team played previous season in College Leagues.

== Promotion and relegation ==
No relegation has occurred as league continued to expand. At the end of the season, the winner and runner-up of the Regional League promotion series, Sagawa Express Tokyo and YKK FC were promoted automatically. In addition, NTT West Kumamoto, SC Tottori and Ehime FC were included by JFA recommendation.
