= Hiroto Sakai =

Japanese footballer

Personal information
- Date of birth: 11 August 1989 (age 37)
- Place of birth: Saitama, Japan
- Height: 1.79 m (5 ft 10 in)
- Position: Midfielder

Team information
- Current team: Ococias Kyoto

Youth career
- Toyohun Jaguars
- Omiya FC
- Saitama Sakae HS
- –2011: Heisei International University

Senior career*
Years	Team	Apps	(Gls)
2012–2013	Japan Soccer College	22	(2)
2014–2015	SP Kyoto	13	(1)
2016–2017	ReinMeer Aomori	46	(3)
2018–2019	Vanraure Hachinohe	22	(1)
2020–	Ococias Kyoto	5	(0)
- * Club domestic league appearances and goals as of 17:04, 13 November 2020 (UTC)

Hiroto Sakai (酒井 大登, Sakai Hiroto; born 11 August 1989) is a Japanese footballer currently playing as a midfielder for Ococias Kyoto.

== Career statistics ==
=== Club ===
As of 13 November 2020.

Club	Season	League			National Cup		League Cup		Other		Total	
Club	Season	Division	Apps	Goals	Apps	Goals	Apps	Goals	Apps	Goals	Apps	Goals
Heisei International University	2011	–			1 (Note: Appearances in the Emperor's Cup)	0	–		0	0	1	0
Japan Soccer College	2012	Hokushinetsu Football League	12	1	0	0	–		0	0	12	1
Japan Soccer College	2013	Hokushinetsu Football League	10	1	0	0	–		0	0	10	1
Japan Soccer College	Total		22	2	0	0	0	0	0	0	22	2
SP Kyoto	2014	JFL	4	1	0	0	–		2 (Note: Appearances in the JFL Championship)	0	6	1
SP Kyoto	2015	JFL	9	0	0	0	–		0	0	9	0
SP Kyoto	Total		13	1	0	0	0	0	2	0	15	1
ReinMeer Aomori	2016	JFL	18	0	0	0	–		0	0	18	0
ReinMeer Aomori	2017	JFL	28	3	0	0	–		0	0	28	3
ReinMeer Aomori	Total		46	3	0	0	0	0	0	0	46	3
Vanraure Hachinohe	2018	JFL	21	1	0	0	–		0	0	21	1
Vanraure Hachinohe	2019	J3 League	1	0	0	0	–		0	0	1	0
Vanraure Hachinohe	Total		22	1	0	0	0	0	0	0	22	1
Ococias Kyoto	2020	Kansai Soccer League	5	0	1	0	–		0	0	6	0
Career total			108	7	2	0	0	0	2	0	112	7
