= Kosei Nukina =

Japanese footballer

Personal information
- Date of birth: 26 April 1995 (age 31)
- Place of birth: Osaka, Japan
- Height: 1.71 m (5 ft 7 in)
- Position: Midfielder

Team information
- Current team: Vanraure Hachinohe
- Number: 24

Youth career
- –2017: Ryutsu Keizai University

Senior career*
Years	Team	Apps	(Gls)
2016–2017	RKD Ryugasaki	24	(2)
2018–	Vanraure Hachinohe	25	(0)
- * Club domestic league appearances and goals as of 17:04, 12 November 2020 (UTC)

Kosei Nukina (貫名 航世, Nukina Kosei; born 26 April 1995) is a Japanese footballer currently playing as a midfielder for Vanraure Hachinohe.

== Career statistics ==
=== Club ===
As of 12 November 2020.

Club	Season	League			National Cup		League Cup		Other		Total	
Club	Season	Division	Apps	Goals	Apps	Goals	Apps	Goals	Apps	Goals	Apps	Goals
RKD Ryugasaki	2016	JFL	4	0	0	0	–		1 (Note: Appearances in the JFL Championship)	0	5	0
RKD Ryugasaki	2017	JFL	20	2	0	0	–		0	0	20	2
RKD Ryugasaki	Total		24	2	0	0	0	0	1	0	25	2
Vanraure Hachinohe	2018	JFL	6	0	0	0	–		0	0	6	0
Vanraure Hachinohe	2019	J3 League	15	0	0	0	–		0	0	15	0
Vanraure Hachinohe	2020	J3 League	4	0	0	0	–		0	0	4	0
Vanraure Hachinohe	Total		25	0	0	0	0	0	0	0	25	0
Career total			49	2	0	0	0	0	1	0	50	2
