= 2002 Japan Football League =

Japan Football League
- Season: 2002
- Dates: 7 April – 10 November
- Champions: Honda FC; 2nd JFL title 3rd D3 title
- Promoted: none
- Relegated: Shizuoka Sangyo University; Alouette Kumamoto; Profesor Miyazaki
- Matches: 153
- Goals: 457 (2.99 per match)
- Top goalscorer: Masao Yamamoto (14 goals total)
- Highest attendance: 3,783 (Round 16, Honda vs. YKK AP)
- Lowest attendance: 125 (Round 7, SE Osaka vs. Sony)
- Average attendance: 574

The 2002 Japan Football League (Japanese: 第4回日本フットボールリーグ, Hepburn: Dai Yon-kai Nihon Futtobōru Rīgu) was the fourth season of the Japan Football League, the third tier of the Japanese football league system.

== Overview ==
2002 JFL teams

It was contested by 18 teams, and Honda FC won the championship. The format was single round-robin as opposed to the usual double to avoid conflict with the FIFA World Cup, which would take place on Japanese soil.

== Table ==
Pos	Team	Pld	W	D	L	GF	GA	GD	Pts	Qualification or relegation
1	Honda FC (Note: Denotes clubs that occupied top 2 places at the end of the previous season and were seeded for 2002 Emperor's Cup. These clubs were automatically qualified for the tournament, while each of other JFL clubs had to go through the prefectural qualifier.) (C)	17	13	2	2	39	14	+25	41	
2	Sagawa Express Tokyo	17	12	3	2	49	22	+27	39	
3	Otsuka Pharmaceuticals	17	10	7	0	38	22	+16	37	
4	Sony Sendai	17	8	6	3	25	16	+9	30	
5	Kokushikan University	17	9	3	5	28	20	+8	30	
6	Ehime FC	17	8	4	5	29	18	+11	28	
7	Yokogawa Electric	17	8	4	5	21	26	−5	28	
8	YKK FC	17	7	5	5	24	16	+8	26	
9	Sagawa Express Osaka	17	6	6	5	27	23	+4	24	
10	Denso SC	17	6	3	8	32	30	+2	21	
11	Kyoto BAMB 1993	17	6	3	8	21	25	−4	21	
12	Tochigi SC	17	5	3	9	21	27	−6	18	
13	SC Tottori	17	4	3	10	18	33	−15	15	
14	ALO's Hokuriku	17	3	6	8	16	34	−18	15	
15	Shizuoka Sangyo University (R)	17	4	2	11	20	32	−12	14	Promotion/relegation Series
16	Jatco SC (O)	17	3	4	10	16	28	−12	13	Promotion/relegation Series
17	Alouette Kumamoto (R)	17	3	4	10	16	28	−12	13	Relegation to Regional Leagues
18	Profesor Miyazaki (R)	17	2	5	10	20	40	−20	11	Relegation to Regional Leagues

Updated to match(es) played on November 10, 2002. Source: Japan Football League
Rules for classification: 1) points; 2) goal difference; 3) number of goals scored.
(C) Champions; (O) Play-off winners; (R) Relegated

== Results ==
Home \ Away	ALO	ALU	BAM	DEN	EHI	HON	JAT	KSU	OTP	PRO	SEO	SET	SON	SSU	TOC	TOT	YKK	YEL
ALO's Hokuriku				0–0			2–2	2–2				0–1	0–2	2–1	1–0	2–2		
Alouette Kumamoto	1–1		0–1		1–1	0–1			4–4	2–1	3–2						0–1	0–1
Kyoto BAMB 1993	1–2			1–4			2–1			1–2		2–3	1–2	4–0	0–0			
Denso SC		3–2						2–3			3–0	2–3	1–1	3–1	2–4	3–2		0–1
Ehime FC	4–0		0–1	1–4			5–1			3–0		1–1		2–1	2–1			
Honda FC	5–1		3–0	2–1	1–0		1–1			7–1	1–3			3–2			1–0	
Jatco SC		0–0		1–0				1–2			1–2	0–1	2–1	0–2	2–0	0–1		
Kokushikan University		1–0	1–0		1–2	0–1			2–3	1–0							0–0	1–0
Otsuka Pharmaceuticals	1–0		4–4	3–2	1–1	0–0	1–0			3–3	1–1						1–0	
Profesor Miyazaki	1–1			2–2			4–2					0–5	1–2	0–2	1–3	1–1		
Sagawa Express Osaka	6–0		0–1		1–0			3–2		2–1			2–2		0–1	0–0		
Sagawa Express Tokyo		5–0				3–1		2–1	1–3		2–2		1–3		2–2	5–3		9–0
Sony Sendai		0–0			2–0	0–3		1–1	2–2							1–0	1–1	3–0
Shizuoka Sangyo University		3–0						2–5	1–3		2–0	0–2	0–2		1–1	1–2		0–2
Tochigi SC		5–0				1–3		0–2	0–4				1–0			1–2	0–3	1–2
SC Tottori		1–0	0–1		1–4	1–4		1–3	0–2								0–3	1–2
YKK FC	2–1		2–0	3–0	1–3		1–1			2–1	1–1	2–3		1–1				
Yokogawa Electric	3–1		1–1		0–0	0–2	3–1		1–2	1–1	2–2						2–1	

Updated to match(es) played on November 10, 2002. Source: Japan Football League
Legend: Blue = home team win; Yellow = draw; Red = away team win.

== Top scorers ==
Rank	Scorer	Club	Goals
1	(Japan) Masao Yamamoto	Sagawa Express Tokyo	22
1	(Japan) Hideki Takayama	Denso SC	22
3	(Japan) Tatsuya Furuhashi	Honda FC	13
3	(Japan) Shigeki Manome	Sagawa Express Tokyo	13
5	(Japan) Takehiro Hayashi	Otsuka Pharmaceuticals	12

== Attendances ==
Pos	Team	Total	High	Low	Average	Change
1	Honda FC	9,903	3,783	511	1,100	+25.1%
2	Ehime FC	8,724	1,645	785	1,091	+65.3%
3	Tochigi SC	8,110	1,647	723	1,014	+56.5%
4	Sony Sendai	6,868	1,169	653	859	+64.9%
5	SC Tottori	6,718	1,509	324	840	+2.6%
6	Otsuka Pharmaceuticals	7,072	1,158	205	786	+31.4%
7	Alouette Kumamoto	6,049	863	412	672	−3.0%
8	Yokogawa Electric	4,770	1,057	252	530	+8.4%
9	YKK FC	4,770	1,141	238	489	−9.4%
10	Jatco SC	4,033	931	232	448	+6.2%
11	Profesor Miyazaki	2,803	618	230	350	n/a^{†}
12	ALO's Hokuriku	2,716	501	202	340	−20.0%
13	Kyoto BAMB 1993	2,716	511	211	336	−4.3%
14	Sagawa Express Tokyo	2,966	533	145	330	−7.8%
15	Kokushikan University	2,851	547	177	317	+44.1%
16	Shizuoka Sangyo University	2,413	583	178	302	−42.0%
17	Denso SC	2,541	505	155	282	−20.8%
18	Sagawa Express Osaka	2,159	386	125	270	n/a^{†}
	League total	87,789	3,783	125	574	+11.5%

Notes:
^{†} Team played previous season in Regional Leagues.

== Promotion and relegation ==
After the season, Alouette Kumamoto and Profesor Miyazaki were automatically relegated to Kyūshū regional league. Due to contraction of the league, the winners and runners-up of the Regional League promotion series, Ain Food and SP Kyoto, were set to compete in the promotion and relegation series with 16th and 15th placed teams – Jatco SC and Shizuoka Sangyo University respectively.

Leg 1

December 22, 2002
12:00

Ain Food	0 – 1	Jatco SC
	Report	井上 祥司 72'

Nagai Aid Stadium, Osaka
Attendance: 452
Referee: Tadashi Hase

December 28, 2002
13:00

Jatco SC	1 – 2	Ain Food
河合 崇泰 81' (pen.)	Report	濱中 貴志 32' 西村 完爾 80'
Penalties
河合 崇泰 (penalty scored) 平塚 次郎 (penalty scored) 堂森 勝利 (penalty scored) 石川 真 (penalty scored)	4 – 2	(penalty scored) Akira Honda; (penalty missed) Kiyoto Shimoyanagi; (penalty scored) Daisuke Sato; (penalty missed) Yusuke Ogura

Ashitaka Stadium, Numazu
Attendance: 475
Referee: 山口 博司

Series tied 2–2. Jatco F.C. won the series 4–2 in penalty shootout and stayed in JFL.

Leg 2

December 23, 2002
13:00

SP Kyoto	0 – 0	Shizuoka Sangyo University
	Report

Nishikyogoku Athletic Stadium, Ukyō-ku, Kyoto
Attendance: 519
Referee: Onishi Hiroyuki

December 29, 2002
13:00

Shizuoka Sangyo University	0 – 0	SP Kyoto
	Report
Penalties
田口 一成 (penalty scored) 竹山 満 (penalty missed); Yoshimoto (penalty scored); Sakurada (penalty scored)	3 – 5	(penalty scored) Nakamori; (penalty scored) 森住 健吾; (penalty scored) 妹尾 将宏; (penalty scored) 山本 健二; (penalty scored) Azuma

Yamaha Stadium, Iwata
Attendance: 1,729
Referee: 野田 祐樹

Series tied 0–0. Sagawa Printing won the series 5–3 in penalty shootout and earned promotion to JFL. Shizuoka Sangyo University were relegated to Tōkai regional league.
