= Hisashi Appiah Tawiah =

Japanese footballer (born 1998)

Personal information
- Date of birth: 18 October 1998 (age 28)
- Place of birth: Aichi, Japan
- Height: 1.91 m (6 ft 3 in)
- Position: Centre-back

Team information
- Current team: Kyoto Sanga
- Number: 5

Youth career
- Aichi FC
- 2014–2016: Toho High School

College career
Years	Team	Apps	(Gls)
2017–2020	Ryutsu Keizai University		

Senior career*
Years	Team	Apps	(Gls)
2017	Ryutsu Keizai Dragons Ryugasaki	4	(0)
2020–2021	Vegalta Sendai	35	(1)
2022–	Kyoto Sanga	72	(0)

International career
2018	Japan U21	2	(0)
- * Club domestic league appearances and goals as of 1 August 2026

Hisashi Appiah Tawiah (アピア タウィア 久, Appiah Tawiah Hisashi; born 18 October 1998) is a Japanese professional footballer who plays as a centre-back for Kyoto Sanga.

== International career ==
Born in Japan, Appiah Tawiah is of Ghanaian descent. He is a youth international for Japan.

== Career statistics ==
=== Club ===
As of match played 7 April 2024

Appearances and goals by club, season and competition
Club	Season	League			Emperor's Cup		J.League Cup		Other		Total	
Club	Season	Division	Apps	Goals	Apps	Goals	Apps	Goals	Apps	Goals	Apps	Goals
Ryutsu Keizai Dragons Ryugasaki	2017	JFL	4	0	0	0	—		0	0	4	0
Ryutsu Keizai University	2018	—			2	1	—		0	0	2	1
Vegalta Sendai	2020	J1 League	6	0	0	0	0	0	0	0	6	0
Vegalta Sendai	2021	J1 League	29	1	1	0	5	0	0	0	35	1
Vegalta Sendai	Total		35	1	1	0	5	0	0	0	41	1
Kyoto Sanga	2022	J1 League	17	0	2	0	5	0	0	0	24	0
Kyoto Sanga	2023	J1 League	18	0	1	0	5	0	0	0	24	0
Kyoto Sanga	2024	J1 League	6	0	0	0	0	0	0	0	24	0
Kyoto Sanga	Total		41	0	3	0	10	0	0	0	54	0
Career total			80	0	6	1	15	0	0	0	101	1
