= Yoshiki Nakai =

Japanese footballer

Yoshiki Nakai 中井 義樹
Personal information
- Full name: Yoshiki Nakai
- Date of birth: January 4, 1983 (age 43)
- Place of birth: Takatsuki, Osaka, Japan
- Height: 1.81 m (5 ft 11 1/2 in)
- Position: Midfielder

Youth career
- 1998–2000: Cerezo Osaka

Senior career*
Years	Team	Apps	(Gls)
2001–2005	Cerezo Osaka	11	(1)
2006–2007	Thespa Kusatsu	38	(2)
2007–2010	Sagawa Printing	90	(7)
2011–2012	V-Varen Nagasaki	33	(1)
2013–2015	SP Kyoto	57	(6)
Total		229	(17)
Medal record
Cerezo Osaka
Runner-up	Emperor's Cup	2001
Runner-up	Emperor's Cup	2003
- * Club domestic league appearances and goals

Yoshiki Nakai (中井 義樹, Nakai Yoshiki; born January 4, 1983) is a former Japanese football player.

== Playing career ==
Nakai was born in Takatsuki on January 4, 1983. He joined J1 League club Cerezo Osaka from youth team in 2001. He could not play at all in the match in 2001 and Cerezo was relegated to J2 League end of 2001 season. He debuted in April 2002 and played several matches as midfielder. Cerezo was also returned to J1 end of 2002 season. However he could hardly play in the match from 2003. In 2006, he moved to J2 club Thespa Kusatsu. He became a regular player as defensive midfielder soon and played many matches in 2006 season. However he could hardly play in the match in 2007 season. In July 2007, he moved to Japan Football League (JFL) club Sagawa Printing (later Sagawa Printing Kyoto, SP Kyoto FC). He became a regular player and played many matches until 2010. In 2011, he moved to JFL club V-Varen Nagasaki. He played as regular player in 2011. However he could not play many matches in 2012 season. Although V-Varen won the champions in 2012 season and was promoted to J2 from 2013, he left the club without playing J2. In 2013, he re-joined Sagawa Printing for the first time in 3 years. He played many matches until 2015. However the club was disbanded end of 2015 season and he retired end of 2015 season.

== Club statistics ==
Club performance			League		Cup		League Cup		Total	
Season	Club	League	Apps	Goals	Apps	Goals	Apps	Goals	Apps	Goals
Japan			League		Emperor's Cup		J.League Cup		Total	
2001	Cerezo Osaka	J1 League	0	0	0	0	0	0	0	0
2002	Cerezo Osaka	J2 League	8	1	0	0	-		8	1
2003	Cerezo Osaka	J1 League	2	0	3	0	3	0	8	0
2004	Cerezo Osaka	J1 League	1	0	0	0	1	0	2	0
2005	Cerezo Osaka	J1 League	0	0	0	0	1	0	1	0
2006	Thespa Kusatsu	J2 League	36	2	1	0	-		37	2
2007	Thespa Kusatsu	J2 League	2	0	0	0	-		2	0
2007	Sagawa Printing	Football League	12	0	2	0	-		14	0
2008	Sagawa Printing	Football League	25	1	3	0	-		28	1
2009	Sagawa Printing	Football League	29	3	2	1	-		31	4
2010	Sagawa Printing	Football League	24	3	1	0	-		25	3
2011	V-Varen Nagasaki	Football League	27	1	2	0	-		29	1
2012	V-Varen Nagasaki	Football League	6	0	0	0	-		6	0
2013	Sagawa Printing	Football League	22	1	2	0	-		24	1
2014	Sagawa Printing Kyoto	Football League	20	2	-		-		20	2
2015	SP Kyoto FC	Football League	15	3	-		-		15	3
Career total			229	17	16	1	5	0	250	18
