= Tatsuya Furuhashi =

Japanese footballer

Tatsuya Furuhashi 古橋 達弥
Personal information
- Full name: Tatsuya Furuhashi
- Date of birth: November 7, 1980 (age 45)
- Place of birth: Hamamatsu, Shizuoka, Japan
- Height: 1.72 m (5 ft 7 1/2 in)
- Position: Forward

Team information
- Current team: Honda
- Number: 10

Youth career
- 1996–1998: Iwata Higashi High School

Senior career*
Years	Team	Apps	(Gls)
1999–2004	Honda FC	119	(85)
2004–2008	Cerezo Osaka	146	(44)
2009–2011	Montedio Yamagata	58	(8)
2012–2013	Shonan Bellmare	43	(5)
2014–2020	Honda	133	(42)
Total		499	(184)
- * Club domestic league appearances and goals as of end of 2020 season

Tatsuya Furuhashi (古橋 達弥, Furuhashi Tatsuya; born November 7, 1980) is a Japanese football player. He last played for Japan Football League club Honda FC.

== Playing career ==
Furuhashi started his career with semi-professional Japan Football League team Honda FC in 1999, while also working as a factory worker. He made his debut for the club in a 5–0 home win over Kokushikan University. He made over 100 league appearances and scored 85 league goals in his time with Honda, and is still a popular figure at the club.

In the summer of 2004, Furuhashi signed his first full-professional contract with J1 League team Cerezo Osaka. He scored on his Cerezo debut, a 4–3 win over FC Tokyo. He had an instant impact and quickly became a regular at Nagai Park. During his time there he formed notable strike partnerships with Hiroaki Morishima, Akinori Nishizawa, Shinji Kagawa and Rui Komatsu. Furuhashi moved to Montedio Yamagata in January 2009, after scoring 44 goals in 146 appearances for Cerezo.

Furuhashi signed for Shonan Bellmare on 28 November 2011. He made his Bellmare debut as a 2nd-half substitute in a 2–1 home win over Kyoto Sanga FC on the opening day of the 2012 season.

== Club statistics ==
Updated 1 January 2018.

Club performance			League		Cup		League Cup		Total	
Season	Club	League	Apps	Goals	Apps	Goals	Apps	Goals	Apps	Goals
Japan			League		Emperor's Cup		J.League Cup		Total	
1999	Honda FC	JFL	10	1	-		-		10	1
2000	Honda FC	JFL	21	14	3	2	-		24	16
2001	Honda FC	JFL	28	11	1	0	-		29	11
2002	Honda FC	JFL	16	13	3	2	-		19	15
2003	Honda FC	JFL	29	31	3	4	-		32	35
2004	Honda FC	JFL	15	15	-		-		15	15
2004	Cerezo Osaka	J1 League	14	5	1	0	2	0	17	5
2005	Cerezo Osaka	J1 League	28	8	4	3	8	4	40	15
2006	Cerezo Osaka	J1 League	32	7	1	0	8	2	41	9
2007	Cerezo Osaka	J2 League	47	18	1	0	-		48	18
2008	Cerezo Osaka	J2 League	25	6	0	0	-		25	6
2009	Montedio Yamagata	J1 League	24	7	2	0	1	0	27	7
2010	Montedio Yamagata	J1 League	22	1	1	0	2	0	25	1
2011	Montedio Yamagata	J1 League	12	0	0	0	2	0	14	0
2012	Shonan Bellmare	J2 League	36	5	0	0	-		36	5
2013	Shonan Bellmare	J1 League	7	0	0	0	3	0	10	0
2014	Honda FC	JFL	16	4	-		-		16	4
2015	Honda FC	JFL	19	3	-		-		19	3
2016	Honda FC	JFL	22	10	2	0	-		24	10
2017	Honda FC	JFL	22	13	1	1	-		23	14
Career total			445	172	23	12	26	6	494	190

== Honours ==
Honda

- Japan Football League: 2001, 2002, 2014, 2016, 2017

Individual

- Japan Football League top-scorer: 2003
- J.League Best XI: 2005
