= Toshihiko Uchiyama (footballer, born 1989) =

Japanese footballer

Personal information
- Full name: Toshihiko Uchiyama
- Date of birth: April 29, 1989 (age 37)
- Place of birth: Chiba, Japan
- Height: 1.72 m (5 ft 7 1/2 in)
- Position: Midfielder

Youth career
- 2009–2012: Ryutsu Keizai University

Senior career*
Years	Team	Apps	(Gls)
2013–2014	Fukushima United FC	32	(3)
2015–2017	Tochigi Uva FC	86	(23)
2018–2021	Tokyo Musashino United FC	19	(3)
- * Club domestic league appearances and goals as of 20 February 2017

Toshihiko Uchiyama (内山 俊彦, Uchiyama Toshihiko; born April 29, 1989) is a Japanese football player.

== Playing career ==
Toshihiko Uchiyama played for Fukushima United FC from 2013 to 2014. in 2015, he moved to Tochigi Uva FC.

== Club statistics ==
Updated to 20 February 2017.

Club performance			League		Cup		Total	
Season	Club	League	Apps	Goals	Apps	Goals	Apps	Goals
Japan			League		Emperor's Cup		Total	
2013	Fukushima United FC	JFL	21	3	2	0	23	3
2014	Fukushima United FC	J3 League	11	0	1	0	12	0
2015	Tochigi Uva FC	JFL	26	7	1	0	27	7
2016	Tochigi Uva FC	JFL	30	11	1	0	31	11
Total			88	21	5	0	93	21
