= 2001 Japanese Regional Leagues =

Japanese amateur leagues football season

Japanese Regional Leagues
- Season: 2001

Statistics of Japanese Regional Leagues for the 2001 season.

== Champions list ==
Region	Champions
Hokkaido	Yuubari Barefoot
Tohoku	Primeiro
Kanto	Honda Luminozo Sayama
Hokushinetsu	Nissei Plastic Industrial
Tokai	Fujieda City Government
Kansai	Sagawa Express Osaka
Chugoku	Hiroshima
Shikoku	Nangoku Kochi
Kyushu	Professor Miyazaki

== League standings ==
=== Hokkaidō ===
Division 1
Pos	Team	Pld	W	PKW	PKL	L	GF	GA	GD	Pts	Qualification or relegation
1	Yuubari Barefoot (C)	10	8	1	0	1	40	12	+28	26	Qualified for 2001 Regional Finals
2	Hokuden	10	7	0	0	3	29	15	+14	21	
3	Blackpecker Hakodate	10	3	2	0	5	19	34	−15	13	
4	Sapporo	10	3	0	3	4	22	26	−4	12	
5	Obihiro	10	3	0	1	6	29	28	+1	10	
6	Nippon Steel Muroran (R)	10	2	1	0	7	22	46	−24	8	Relegated to the Division 2

Source: RSSSF
(C) Champion; (R) Relegated

Division 2
Pos	Team	Pld	W	PKW	PKL	L	GF	GA	GD	Pts	Qualification or relegation
1	Sapporo Thank	10	8	0	1	1	26	6	+20	25	Promoted to Division 1
2	Erizenmaki Vankei	10	6	1	2	1	31	16	+15	22	
3	Sapporo University OB	10	6	0	0	4	26	23	+3	18	
4	Chitose Bombers	10	4	0	0	6	37	31	+6	12	
5	JSW Muroran	10	2	1	0	7	13	27	−14	8	
6	Nippon Paper Tomakomai	10	1	1	0	8	13	43	−30	5	Relegated to the Prefectural block

Source: RSSSF

=== Tohoku ===
Division 1
Pos	Team	Pld	W	D	L	GF	GA	GD	Pts
1	Primeiro	14	11	1	2	41	13	+28	34
2	TDK	14	9	2	3	41	12	+29	29
3	Aster Aomori	14	7	1	6	36	24	+12	22
4	NEC Tokin	14	6	2	6	18	17	+1	20
5	Morioka Zebra	14	5	3	6	22	31	−9	18
6	Nippon Steel Kamaishi	14	3	4	7	17	31	−14	13
7	Matsushima	14	3	3	8	18	44	−26	12
8	Yamagata	14	3	2	9	18	39	−21	11

Source: RSSSF

Division 2 North
Pos	Team	Pld	W	D	L	GF	GA	GD	Pts
1	Akita City Government	10	7	1	2	26	11	+15	22
2	Hokuto Bank SC	10	7	0	3	50	11	+39	21
3	Tono Club	10	6	1	3	28	15	+13	19
4	Omiya	10	3	1	6	25	31	−6	10
5	Hachinohe Kosei	10	3	1	6	20	50	−30	10
6	Towada Kickers	10	1	2	7	16	47	−31	5

Source: RSSSF

Division 2 South
Pos	Team	Pld	W	D	L	GF	GA	GD	Pts
1	Furukawa Battery	10	9	0	1	50	17	+33	27
2	Sendai Nakada Club	10	7	0	3	44	11	+33	21
3	Kushibiki Club	10	6	0	4	29	17	+12	18
4	Shichigahama	10	6	0	4	32	22	+10	18
5	NEC Yonezawa	10	2	0	8	14	54	−40	6
6	Matsushita Electric Fukushima	10	0	0	10	15	63	−48	0

Source: RSSSF

=== Kantō ===
Pos	Team	Pld	W	D	L	GF	GA	GD	Pts
1	Honda Luminozo Sayama	18	17	1	0	54	3	+51	52
2	Saitama	18	9	3	6	27	29	−2	30
3	Toho Titanium	18	8	4	6	24	23	+1	28
4	Nirasaki Astros	18	8	2	8	44	37	+7	26
5	Maritime Self Defence Forces Atsugi Base Marcus	18	7	4	7	29	25	+4	25
6	Aries Tokyo	18	7	4	7	22	20	+2	25
7	Tonan	18	6	4	8	27	30	−3	22
8	Ome	18	6	2	10	31	39	−8	20
9	Kanagawa Teachers	18	4	2	12	16	50	−34	14
10	Kuyo	18	3	4	11	23	41	−18	13

Source: RSSSF

=== Hokushin'etsu ===
Pos	Team	Pld	W	OTW	D	OTL	L	GF	GA	GD	Pts
1	Nissei Plastic Industrial	8	7	0	1	0	0	23	5	+18	22
2	Ueda Gentian	8	6	0	1	0	1	25	9	+16	19
3	Kanazawa	8	3	1	1	0	3	18	13	+5	12
4	Fukui	8	3	1	1	1	2	12	14	−2	13
5	Valiente Toyama	8	3	1	0	1	3	14	13	+1	12
6	Nagano Elsa	8	2	0	1	0	5	13	15	−2	7
7	Teihens	8	1	1	2	1	3	7	16	−9	8
8	Niigatashuyukai	8	1	0	3	0	4	9	16	−7	6
9	Yamaga	8	0	0	2	1	5	4	24	−20	3

Source: RSSSF

=== Tōkai ===
Pos	Team	Pld	W	D	L	GF	GA	GD	Pts
1	Fujieda City Government	15	12	1	2	57	13	+44	37
2	Yazaki Valente	15	10	1	4	35	17	+18	31
3	Chukyo University	15	8	6	1	31	17	+14	30
4	Nagoya	15	9	3	3	37	27	+10	30
5	Hitachi Shimizu	15	8	1	6	27	23	+4	25
6	Maruyasu	15	7	1	7	27	24	+3	22
7	Honda Suzuka	15	7	1	7	28	32	−4	22
8	Chuo Bohan	15	6	3	6	32	27	+5	21
9	Nagoya Bank	15	5	4	6	33	34	−1	19
10	Minolta	15	5	4	6	18	22	−4	19
11	Yamaha Motors	15	5	2	8	21	35	−14	17
12	Toyoda Machine Works	15	4	4	7	16	29	−13	16
13	Kasugai Club	15	4	3	8	21	36	−15	15
14	Toyota	15	3	4	8	15	29	−14	13
15	Matsushita Electric Iga	15	3	2	10	17	26	−9	11
16	Tokai Rika	15	3	2	10	18	42	−24	11

Source: RSSSF

=== Kansai ===
Pos	Team	Pld	W	D	L	GF	GA	GD	Pts
1	Sagawa Express Osaka	18	16	2	0	54	5	+49	50
2	Sagawa Printing	18	12	3	3	41	20	+21	39
3	Hermano Osaka	18	9	5	4	33	21	+12	32
4	Kobe 1970	18	7	3	8	39	44	−5	24
5	Takada	18	7	3	8	28	33	−5	24
6	Central Kobe	18	6	5	7	24	25	−1	23
7	Kyoto Shiko Club	18	7	0	11	24	31	−7	21
8	NTT West Japan Kyoto	18	5	3	10	22	36	−14	18
9	Sanyo Electric Sumoto	18	6	0	12	22	52	−30	18
10	Osaka Gas	18	3	0	15	26	46	−20	9

Source: RSSSF

=== Chūgoku ===
Pos	Team	Pld	W	PKW	PKL	L	GF	GA	GD	Pts
1	Hiroshima	12	8	1	2	1	33	18	+15	28
2	Mitsubishi Motors Mizushima	12	7	0	1	4	24	12	+12	22
3	Hiroshima Fujita	12	6	2	0	4	28	26	+2	22
4	Hiroshima Teachers	12	5	0	1	6	19	26	−7	16
5	Mazda	12	3	2	1	6	15	20	−5	14
6	Nisshin Steel Kure	12	3	1	1	7	20	24	−4	12
7	Yamaguchi Teachers	12	3	1	1	7	17	30	−13	12

Source: RSSSF

=== Shikoku ===
Pos	Team	Pld	W	D	L	GF	GA	GD	Pts
1	Nangoku Kochi	14	14	0	0	61	14	+47	42
2	Imao	14	10	0	4	57	28	+29	30
3	Sunlife	14	7	3	4	45	25	+20	24
4	Sanyo Electric Tokushima	14	6	2	6	27	30	−3	20
5	Teijin	14	5	2	7	24	38	−14	17
6	Sanwa Club	14	3	2	9	23	42	−19	11
7	Showa Club	14	2	3	9	18	52	−34	9
8	Prima Meat Packers	14	1	4	9	16	42	−26	7

Source: RSSSF

=== Kyushu ===
Pos	Team	Pld	W	PKW	PKL	L	GF	GA	GD	Pts
1	Professor Miyazaki	18	14	0	2	2	58	17	+41	44
2	Nippon Steel Oita	18	12	3	1	2	57	18	+39	43
3	Volca Kagoshima	18	11	1	2	4	51	34	+17	37
4	Kyocera Sendai	18	10	3	1	4	38	23	+15	37
5	Honda Lock	18	8	2	1	7	33	34	−1	29
6	Mitsubishi Heavy Industries Nagasaki	18	8	0	3	7	39	32	+7	27
7	Kyusyu Inax	18	4	2	1	11	19	41	−22	17
8	New Wave Kitakyushu	18	5	0	0	13	25	46	−21	15
9	Lanza Kumamoto	18	2	2	1	13	15	50	−35	11
10	Blaze Kumamoto	18	3	0	1	14	11	51	−40	10

Source: RSSSF
