= Kazuki Sakurada =

Japanese footballer

Personal information
- Full name: Kazuki Sakurada
- Date of birth: August 1, 1982 (age 44)
- Place of birth: Shizuoka, Japan
- Height: 1.67 m (5 ft 5 1/2 in)
- Position: Midfielder

Youth career
- 1998–2000: Shizuoka Gakuen High School
- 2001–2004: Shizuoka Sangyo University

Senior career*
| Years | Team | Apps | (Gls) |
| 2005–2013 | Thespakusatsu Gunma | 223 | (5) |
| Total | | 223 | (5) |
- * Club domestic league appearances and goals

Kazuki Sakurada (櫻田 和樹, Sakurada Kazuki; born August 1, 1982) is a former Japanese football player.

== Club statistics ==
| Club performance | | | League | | Cup | | Total | |
| Season | Club | League | Apps | Goals | Apps | Goals | Apps | Goals |
| Japan | | | League | | Emperor's Cup | | Total | |
|---|---|---|---|---|---|---|---|---|
| 2001 | Shizuoka Sangyo University | Football League | 11 | 1 | - | | 11 | 1 |
| 2002 | Shizuoka Sangyo University | Football League | 14 | 0 | - | | 14 | 0 |
| 2005 | Thespa Kusatsu | J2 League | 7 | 0 | 1 | 0 | 8 | 0 |
| 2006 | Thespa Kusatsu | J2 League | 14 | 0 | 1 | 0 | 15 | 0 |
| 2007 | Thespa Kusatsu | J2 League | 46 | 2 | 2 | 0 | 48 | 2 |
| 2008 | Thespa Kusatsu | J2 League | 12 | 0 | 2 | 0 | 14 | 0 |
| 2009 | Thespa Kusatsu | J2 League | 49 | 1 | 1 | 1 | 50 | 2 |
| 2010 | Thespa Kusatsu | J2 League | 27 | 0 | 1 | 0 | 28 | 0 |
| 2011 | Thespa Kusatsu | J2 League | | | | | | |
| Country | Japan | | 180 | 4 | 8 | 1 | 188 | 5 |
| Total | | | 180 | 4 | 8 | 1 | 188 | 5 |
