= Koki Takenaka =

Japanese footballer

Koki Takenaka 竹中公基
Personal information
- Full name: Koki Takenaka
- Date of birth: September 8, 1992 (age 34)
- Place of birth: Osaka, Japan
- Height: 1.82 m (5 ft 11 1/2 in)
- Position: Forward

Team information
- Current team: Tochigi Uva FC
- Number: 11

Youth career
- 2008–2010: Seiritsu Gakuen High School

Senior career*
Years	Team	Apps	(Gls)
2011–2012	Tokyo Verdy	1	(0)
2013–2016	Briobecca Urayasu	47	(35)
2017	Tochigi SC	9	(0)
2017	→ Vanraure Hachinohe (loan)	10	(2)
2018–	Tochigi Uva FC		
- * Club domestic league appearances and goals as of 27 February 2018

Koki Takenaka (竹中 公基, Takenaka Koki; born September 8, 1992) is a Japanese football player for Tochigi Uva FC.

== Club statistics ==
Updated to 23 February 2018.

Club performance			League		Cup		Total	
Season	Club	League	Apps	Goals	Apps	Goals	Apps	Goals
Japan			League		Emperor's Cup		Total	
2011	Tokyo Verdy	J2 League	0	0	0	0	0	0
2012	Tokyo Verdy	J2 League	1	0	1	0	2	0
2013	Briobecca Urayasu	JRL (Kantō, Div. 2)			0	0	0	0
2014	Briobecca Urayasu	JRL (Kantō, Div. 1)			2	0	2	0
2015	Briobecca Urayasu	JRL (Kantō, Div. 1)	18	18	–		18	18
2016	Briobecca Urayasu	JFL	29	17	–		29	17
2017	Tochigi SC	J3 League	9	0	–		9	0
2017	Vanraure Hachinohe	JFL	10	2	–		10	2
Total			67	37	3	0	70	37
