= Toyoki =

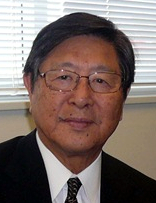
- Toyoki Kunitake, Japanese chemist
- Pronunciation: tojokʲi (IPA)
- Gender: Male

Origin
- Origin: Japanese
- Meaning: Different meanings depending on the kanji used

Toyoki is a masculine Japanese given name.

== Written forms ==
Toyoki can be written using different combinations of kanji characters. Here are some examples:

- 豊紀, "bountiful, chronicle"
- 豊規, "bountiful, to scheme"
- 豊喜, "bountiful, rejoice"
- 豊貴, "bountiful, precious"
- 豊機, "bountiful, opportunity/machine"
- 豊基, "bountiful, foundation"
- 豊輝, "bountiful, sparkle"
- 豊樹, "bountiful, tree"
- 豊起, "bountiful, rise/wake up"

The name can also be written in hiragana とよき or katakana トヨキ.

== Notable people with the name ==
- Toyoki Hasegawa (長谷川 豊喜; born 1986), Japanese footballer.
- Toyoki Kunitake (國武 豊喜, born 1936), Japanese chemist.
- Toyoki Takeda (武田 豊樹; born 1974), Japanese speed skater.
