= Ryota Kuwajima =

Japanese footballer

Personal information
- Date of birth: 5 September 1992 (age 34)
- Place of birth: Wakayama, Japan
- Height: 1.75 m (5 ft 9 in)
- Position: Forward

Team information
- Current team: Nara Club
- Number: 7

Youth career
- Kishi SSS
- 2005–2007: Nishiwaki Junior High School
- 2008–2010: Teikyo High School

College career
Years	Team	Apps	(Gls)
2011–2014	Osaka Gakuin University		

Senior career*
Years	Team	Apps	(Gls)
2015	FC Osaka	10	(0)
2016–2020	FC Imabari	124	(52)
2021-	Nara Club	81	(7)
Total		215	(59)
- * Club domestic league appearances and goals as of 17:04, 10 November 2020 (UTC)

Ryota Kuwajima (桑島 良汰, Kuwajima Ryota; born 5 September 1992) is a Japanese footballer currently playing as a forward for Nara Club.

== Career statistics ==
=== Club ===
As of 10 November 2020.

Club	Season	League			National Cup		League Cup		Other		Total	
Club	Season	Division	Apps	Goals	Apps	Goals	Apps	Goals	Apps	Goals	Apps	Goals
FC Osaka	2015	JFL	10	0	1 (Note: Appearance(s) in Emperor's Cup)	0	–		0	0	11	0
FC Imabari	2016	Shikoku Soccer League	14	8	1	0	–		6 (Note: Appearance(s) in Japanese Regional Football League Competition)	6	21	14
FC Imabari	2017	JFL	29	17	2	2	–		0	0	31	19
FC Imabari	2018	JFL	26	14	2	0	–		0	0	28	14
FC Imabari	2019	JFL	26	8	0	0	–		0	0	26	8
FC Imabari	2020	J3 League	26	5	0	0	–		0	0	26	5
FC Imabari	Total		121	52	5	2	0	0	6	6	132	60
Career total			131	52	6	2	0	0	6	6	143	60
