= Verspah Oita =

Japanese football club

Verspah Oita ヴェルスパ大分
- Full name: Verspah Oita
- Founded: 2003; 23 years ago
- Ground: Oita Sports Park
- Capacity: 16,000
- Chairman: Sanu Toru
- Manager: Takashi Yamahashi
- League: Japan Football League
- 2025: 6th of 16
- Website: verspah.jp
Home colours	Away colours

Verspah Oita (ヴェルスパ大分, Verusupa Ōita) is a Japanese football club based in the city of Ōita, capital of Ōita Prefecture. They currently play in the Japan Football League, the fourth tier of Japanese league football. The 2025 season is their 14th consecutive season in the JFL.

== History ==
The club was formed in 2003 as Hoyo FC. In 2005 they changed their name to Hoyo Atletico Elan, the name in which they competed for many years in the Kyushu Football League. The club is backed by the Hoyo Group, a digital camera and auto parts manufacturer based in nearby Kunisaki. In 2010 they changed their name to Hoyo Atletico Elan Oita. In 2011, they changed their name to Hoyo AC Elan Oita, won the Kyushu Soccer League and earned third place in the Regional League promotion series, which gave them qualification to compete in the JFL from 2012. Ahead of a league jump, they changed their name to Hoyo Oita on 2012.

In December 2013, the club tried to get closer ties to the community and therefore made another name change, this time to Verspah Oita (ヴェルスパ大分, Verusupa Ōita), for the 2014 season onwards, which the club have kept untouched ever since.

In 2020, Verspah won their first Japan Football League title. The title campaign was fairly unusual, as issues regarding COVID-19 prevented the league to be held normally. The clubs were only able to play the first half of the planned matches, 15 out of 30. The league decided to abandon the season and give the title to the 1st-placed team at that time, which was Verspah Oita. As the club did not have a J3 license at the time, the club was unable to receive promotion to professional league football, despite being a J.League 100 Year Plan club status holders.

In 2021, with the league operating normally with all matches being played, Verspah ended the league season in the 3rd place, but, the same issue was brought up. The club still was not a J3 license holder, and then, could not get promoted to the J3. Their J3 license was issued and granted only in the following 2022 season, which the club finished in 8th place, eight points off the promotion zone.

=== Team name ===
The current team's name, "Verspah", was coined by combining the Portuguese word "vermelho", which means "red", and the English word "spa", which represents hot springs (after famously known Beppu Onsen), and the initial letter "H" of the former team name Hoyo Oita.

=== Home Towns ===
The main home towns are Beppu and Yufu. On 28 June 2022, at a J.League Board of Directors meeting, they approved the addition of the Ōita city.

== Historical Logos ==
used until 2012	used 2012–2013
Hoyo AC Elan Oita crest, used until 2012	Hoyo Oita crest, used in 2012 and 2013

== League & cup record ==
Champions	Runners-up	Third place	Promoted	Relegated

League													Emperor's Cup
Season	Division	Tier	Pos.	P	W (PK)	D	L (PK)	F	A	GD	Pts	Att/G	Emperor's Cup
Hoyo Atletico Elan
2007	Oita Prefectural League (Div. 1)	5	2nd	10	8	1	1	53	5	48	25		–
2008	Oita Prefectural League (Div. 1)	5	3rd	10	7	1	2	44	11	33	22		–
2009	Oita Prefectural League (Div. 1)	5	1st	9	8	1	0	39	5	34	25		–
Hoyo Atletico Elan Oita
2010	Kyushu Soccer; League	4	1st	16	13 (2)	–	1 (0)	48	8	40	44		1st round
Hoyo AC Elan Oita
2011	Kyushu Soccer; League	4	1st	18	15 (2)	–	0 (1)	55	11	44	49		1st round
Hoyo Oita
2012	JFL	3	15th	32	9	8	15	40	57	-17	35	479	2nd round
2013	JFL	3	15th	34	9	5	20	32	45	-13	32	333	2nd round
Verspah Oita
2014	JFL	4	7th	26	8	9	9	30	28	2	33	333	2nd round
2015	JFL	4	10th	30	10	7	13	40	47	-7	37	488	2nd round
2016	JFL	4	13th	30	6	13	11	30	42	-12	31	488	Did not qualify
2017	JFL	4	14th	30	5	12	13	27	46	-19	27	407	2nd round
2018	JFL	4	9th	30	11	6	13	29	38	-9	39	582	1st round
2019	JFL	4	7th	30	10	10	10	42	36	6	40	503	1st round
2020 †	JFL	4	1st	15	10	2	3	27	16	11	32	306	4th round
2021 †	JFL	4	3rd	32	19	5	8	46	24	22	62	386	Round of 16
2022	JFL	4	8th	30	12	7	11	40	44	-4	43	1,590	2nd round
2023	JFL	4	6th	28	10	10	8	28	29	-1	40	834	3rd round
2024	JFL	4	6th	30	11	12	7	37	37	0	45	1,801	Did not qualify
2025	JFL	4	5th	30	14	7	9	41	33	8	49	1,822	1st round
2026/27	JFL	4	TBD	30									TBD

Key

- Pos. = Position in league; P = Games played; W = Games won; D = Games drawn; L = Games lost; F = Goals scored; A = Goals conceded; GD = Goals difference; Pts = Points gained
- Att/G = Average home league attendance
- † 2020 & 2021 seasons attendances reduced by COVID-19 worldwide pandemic

== Honours ==
Verspah Oita Honours
Honour	No.	Years
Oita Prefecture League 3rd Division	1	2005
Oita Prefecture League 2nd Division	1	2006
Oita Prefecture League 1st Division	1	2009
Kyushu League	2	2010, 2011
Japan Football League	1	2020

== Current squad ==
As of 30 May 2024. Note: Flags indicate national team as defined under FIFA eligibility rules; some limited exceptions apply. Players may hold more than one non-FIFA nationality.

No.	Pos.	Nation	Player
1	GK	JPN	Takashi Himeno
2	DF	JPN	Takuma Hamasaki
3	DF	JPN	Konosuke Fukumiya
4	DF	JPN	Daigo Nishimura (vice-captain)
5	MF	JPN	Tatsumi Hineno
6	DF	JPN	Hikaru Ishigami
7	MF	JPN	Takumi Nakano
8	MF	JPN	Kenta Hori
9	FW	JPN	Yusuke Imamura
10	MF	JPN	Takaki Fukumitsu
11	MF	JPN	Keitaro Suzuki
14	MF	JPN	Kazuho Yamasaki
15	DF	JPN	Ryuya Ikeuchi
17	MF	JPN	Takumi Fujimoto

No.	Pos.	Nation	Player
18	FW	JPN	Makoto Nakamura
19	MF	JPN	Kai Shigeta
20	GK	JPN	Shun Sato
21	MF	JPN	Kanta Kokura
22	MF	JPN	Kosei Uryu
23	DF	JPN	Yu Miyamoto (on loan from Tokyo Verdy)
24	FW	JPN	Tsubasa Sasaki
25	DF	JPN	Soma Ito
26	DF	JPN	Tsubasa Ito
28	MF	JPN	Itsuki Ajima
29	DF	JPN	Shun Taketa
30	DF	JPN	Tsutomu Murata
31	GK	JPN	Jumpei Toyoda
40	FW	JPN	Takuto Nakai

== Club staff ==
Position	Staff
Manager	(Japan) Takashi Yamahashi
Assistant manager	(Japan) Gen Nakamura
First-team coach	(Japan) Toyoki Hasegawa (Japan) Kazuya Sakamoto
Goalkeeper coach	(Japan) Masao Noda
Physical coach	(Japan) Shota Maki
Trainer	(Japan) Ryo Hanada
Kit man	(Japan) Ryota Sakamoto
Side affairs	(Japan) Chiharu Suzukawa

== Managerial history ==
Manager	Nationality	Tenure	
Manager	Nationality	Start	Finish
Haruo Yuki	Japan	1 January 1, 2012	31 December 2015
Tōru Sano	Japan	1 February 2016	31 January 2018
Shigemitsu Sudō	Japan	1 February 2018	31 January 2021
Takashi Yamahashi	Japan	1 February 2021	Current
