= Kazuhito Kishida =

Japanese footballer

Kazuhito Kishida 岸田和人
Personal information
- Full name: Kazuhito Kishida
- Date of birth: 3 April 1990 (age 36)
- Place of birth: Hiji, Ōita, Japan
- Height: 1.81 m (5 ft 11 in)
- Position: Striker

Team information
- Current team: Baleine Shimonoseki
- Number: 9

Youth career
- 2006–2008: Oita Trinita

College career
Years	Team	Apps	(Gls)
2009–2012	Fukuoka University		

Senior career*
Years	Team	Apps	(Gls)
2013–2014	Machida Zelvia	15	(4)
2014	→ Renofa Yamaguchi (loan)	21	(17)
2015–2022	Renofa Yamaguchi	154	(51)
2020	→ Iwate Grulla Morioka (loan)	21	(3)
2023-	FC Baleine Shimonoseki	-	(-)
- * Club domestic league appearances and goals as of January 1, 2022

Kazuhito Kishida (岸田和人, Kishida Kazuhito; born 3 April 1990) is a Japanese footballer who plays for J2 League club Baleine Shimonoseki, as a forward.

== Career ==
He is the twin brother of Shohei Kishida, who currently plays for Sagan Tosu.

Kishida is a prolific goalscorer. In the 2014 season, he scored 17 goals, becoming the Japan Football League top-scorer.

== Club statistics ==
Updated to January 1, 2022.

Club performance			League		Cup		Total	
Season	Club	League	Apps	Goals	Apps	Goals	Apps	Goals
Japan			League		Emperor's Cup		Total	
2013	Machida Zelvia	JFL	15	4	-		15	4
2014	Renofa Yamaguchi	JFL	21	17	-		21	17
2015	Renofa Yamaguchi	J3 League	34	32	0	0	34	32
2016	Renofa Yamaguchi	J2 League	23	4	1	0	24	4
2017	Renofa Yamaguchi	J2 League	30	7	0	0	30	7
2018	Renofa Yamaguchi	J2 League	29	4	2	0	31	4
2019	Renofa Yamaguchi	J2 League	9	1	2	0	11	1
2020	Iwate Grulla Morioka	J3 League	21	3	-		21	3
2021	Renofa Yamaguchi	J2 League	6	0	1	0	7	0
Total			188	72	6	0	194	72
