= Hiromu Chiba =

Japanese footballer (born 2005)

Personal information
- Date of birth: 10 May 2005 (age 21)
- Place of birth: Osaka, Japan
- Height: 1.70 m (5 ft 7 in)
- Positions: Forward; midfielder

Team information
- Current team: RKD Ryugasaki
- Number: 36

Youth career
- Cerezo Osaka
- 2021–2023: Kokoku High School

College career
| Years | Team | Apps | (Gls) |
| 2024– | Ryutsu Keizai University | | |

Senior career*
| Years | Team | Apps | (Gls) |
| 2024– | RKD Ryugasaki | 26 | (5) |

International career^{‡}
| 2020 | Japan U16 | 2 | (1) |
- * Club domestic league appearances and goals as of 17:04, 18 January 2026 (UTC) ‡ National team caps and goals as of 17:04, 27 February 2023 (UTC)

Hiromu Chiba (千葉大舞, Chiba Hiromu; born 10 May 2005) is a Japanese footballer who plays as a forward.

== Club career ==
=== High school football ===
Having developed in the academy of professional club Cerezo Osaka, Chiba moved to the Kokoku High School in September 2021 to continue his footballing career. While at the high school, he was selected by German club Bayern Munich to be part of their "World Squad" initiative, representing the club in international friendlies. He scored in a friendly game against the under-20 team of Brazilian club Vasco da Gama.

While training with the World Squad, Chiba missed important games with Kokoku, including a loss to the Kandai Hokuyo-Osaka High School in the Inter-High Osaka preliminary competition. On his return to Kokoku, he established himself as one of the key players in the team.

== International career ==
In January 2020, Chiba was called up to the Japan national under-16 football team for a tour of Turkey, playing in friendlies against the Czech Republic and Tunisia.

== Personal life ==
Chiba's brother, Daigo, is also a footballer, and currently plays at the Kwansei Gakuin University.

== Career statistics ==
=== Club ===
As of 18 January 2026

Appearances and goals by club, season and competition
| Club | Season | League | | | Cup | | Other | | Total | |
| Club | Season | Division | Apps | Goals | Apps | Goals | Apps | Goals | Apps | Goals |
|---|---|---|---|---|---|---|---|---|---|---|
| RKD Ryugasaki | 2024 | Kantō Soccer League Div 2 | 14 | 3 | 0 | 0 | 0 | 0 | 14 | 3 |
| RKD Ryugasaki | 2025 | Kantō Soccer League Div 1 | 12 | 2 | 0 | 0 | 0 | 0 | 12 | 2 |
| Career total | | | 26 | 5 | 0 | 0 | 0 | 0 | 26 | 5 |
