= Takaki Fukumitsu =

Japanese footballer (born 1992)

Takaki Fukumitsu 福満 隆貴
Personal information
- Full name: Takaki Fukumitsu
- Date of birth: 22 February 1992 (age 34)
- Place of birth: Kagoshima, Japan
- Height: 1.71 m (5 ft 7 in)
- Positions: Winger; attacking midfielder

Team information
- Current team: Verspah Oita
- Number: 10

Youth career
- 2007–2009: Izumi Central High School

Senior career*
Years	Team	Apps	(Gls)
2010–2011	Kyushu SSC	33	(21)
2012–2014	Hoyo Oita/Verspah Oita	85	(26)
2015–2016	Renofa Yamaguchi	75	(24)
2017–2020	Cerezo Osaka	25	(1)
2017	Cerezo Osaka U-23	1	(0)
2019	→ Mito HollyHock (loan)	19	(3)
2020	→ Avispa Fukuoka (loan)	26	(2)
2021–2024	JEF United Chiba	85	(3)
2024-	Verspah Oita	55	(3)
Medal record
Cerezo Osaka
Winner	J.League Cup	2017
Winner	Emperor's Cup	2017
- * Club domestic league appearances and goals as of 21:58, 14 April 2026 (UTC)

Takaki Fukumitsu (福満 隆貴, Fukumitsu Takaki; born February 22, 1992) is a Japanese footballer who plays for JFL club Verspah Oita.

== Club statistics ==
As of 14 April 2026.

Appearances and goals by club, season and competition
Club	Season	League			National cup (Note: Includes Emperors Cup)		League cup (Note: Includes J.League Cup)		Continental		Other		Total	
Club	Season	Division	Apps	Goals	Apps	Goals	Apps	Goals	Apps	Goals	Apps	Goals	Apps	Goals
Kyushu SSC	2010	JRL (Kyushu)	16	7	–		–		–		–		16	7
Kyushu SSC	2011	JRL (Kyushu)	17	14	–		–		–		–		17	14
Kyushu SSC	Total		33	21	0	0	0	0	0	0	0	0	33	21
Hoyo Oita	2012	JFL	30	8	2	1	–		–		–		32	9
Hoyo Oita	2013	JFL	30	5	2	1	–		–		–		32	6
Hoyo Oita	2014	JFL	25	13	2	2	–		–		–		27	15
Hoyo Oita	Total		85	26	6	4	0	0	0	0	0	0	91	30
Renofa Yamaguchi	2015	J3 League	35	19	1	0	–		–		–		36	19
Renofa Yamaguchi	2016	J2 League	40	5	2	0	–		–		–		42	5
Renofa Yamaguchi	Total		75	24	3	0	0	0	0	0	0	0	78	24
Cerezo Osaka	2017	J1 League	5	0	5	2	12	2	0	0	0	0	22	4
Cerezo Osaka	2018	J1 League	20	1	3	1	1	0	3 (Note: Appearances in AFC Champions League Elite)	1	2 (Note: Appearance in Japanese Super Cup)	0	29	3
Cerezo Osaka	2019	J1 League	0	0	0	0	7	1	0	0	0	0	7	1
Cerezo Osaka	Total		25	1	8	3	20	3	3	1	2	0	58	8
Cerezo Osaka U-23 (loan)	2017	J3 League	1	0	–		–		–		–		1	0
Mito HollyHock (loan)	2019	J2 League	19	3	1	0	–		–		–		20	3
Avispa Fukuoka (loan)	2020	J2 League	26	2	–		–		–		–		26	2
JEF United Chiba	2021	J2 League	36	3	2	0	–		–		0	0	38	3
JEF United Chiba	2022	J2 League	34	0	0	0	–		–		0	0	34	0
JEF United Chiba	2023	J2 League	15	0	0	0	–		–		1 (Note: Appearance in J1/J2 play-offs)	0	16	0
JEF United Chiba	Total		85	3	2	0	0	0	0	0	1	0	88	3
Verspah Oita	2024	JFL	23	1	0	0	–		–		–		23	1
Verspah Oita	2025	JFL	28	2	1	0	–		–		–		29	2
Verspah Oita	2026	JFL Cup	4	0	0	0	–		–		–		4	0
Verspah Oita	Total		55	3	1	0	0	0	0	0	0	0	56	3
Career total			404	83	21	7	20	3	3	1	3	0	451	94
