= Estrela Miyazaki =

- Full name: Estrela Miyazaki
- Founded: 1970 (as Miyazaki Teachers SC)
- Dissolved: 2010
- Ground: Miyazaki, Japan
- League: dissolved

Estrela Miyazaki was a Japanese football club based in Miyazaki. The club played in the Japan Football League. J.FC Miyazaki is considered a spiritual successor.

== History ==
The Miyazaki Teachers’ Team, which preceded the current team, boasts a history of five years in the Kyushu Soccer League. In 1999, the team transitioned into a club organisation with the goal of joining the Japan Professional Soccer League (J League). The club was based in Kunitomi and took on the name Profesor Miyazaki FC. The term “Profesor” is Spanish for “teacher”.

In 2001, the team emerged victorious in the Kyushu League. They also secured third place in the National Adult Soccer Championship and were runners-up in the National Regional League Final. In 2002, they were promoted to the Japan Football League (JFL), but their performance was lacklustre. In September, Kashiwada Kiyomitsu resigned as manager, and Hashimitsu Shiro stepped in as the coach while also playing for the team. Despite these changes, the team finished last and was automatically relegated to the Kyushu League. However, they did achieve their first victory in the first round of the 82nd Emperor's Cup All Japan Football Championship.

In 2003, the team underwent a rebranding and was renamed Sun Miyazaki FC, drawing inspiration from “Miyazaki, the Land of the Sun and Greenery”. The team also relocated its headquarters to Miyazaki City. However, this period was marked by the departure of nineteen players and staff from the club in February 2003. In the 83rd Emperor's Cup, they were defeated by Momoyama Gakuin University in the first round.

In 2005, the team finished last in the Kyushu League and was automatically relegated to the Miyazaki Prefectural Soccer League. In 2007, the team was rebranded again, this time as Estrela Miyazaki. “Estrella” translates to “star” in Portuguese. They won the Miyazaki Prefecture First Division League but were eliminated in the first round of the Kyushu Prefectural League Finals.

The club was disbanded in March 2010. The right to participate in the Miyazaki Prefectural League was subsequently taken over by the Miyazaki University of Industry and Management FC.

== Club name ==
- 1970-1998: Miyazaki Teachers SC
- 1999-2002: Profesor Miyazaki
- 2003-2006: Sun Miyazaki
- 2007-2009: Estrela Miyazaki

== Honours ==
Estrela Miyazaki honours
Honour	No.	Years
Miyazaki Prefecture Division 2	1	1999
Miyazaki Prefecture Division 1	2	2000, 2007
Kyushu Soccer League	1	2001
