= 2014 Japan Football League =

Japan Football League
- Season: 2014
- Champions: Honda FC; 5th JFL title 1st D4 title
- Promoted: Renofa Yamaguchi
- Matches: 182
- Goals: 492 (2.7 per match)
- Top goalscorer: Kazuhito Kishida (17 goals)
- Highest attendance: 4,569; Renofa vs Honda FC
- Lowest attendance: 145; Maruyasu vs Yokogawa
- Average attendance: 859

The 2014 Japan Football League (Japanese: 第16回日本フットボールリーグ, Hepburn: Dai Jūrokkai Nihon Futtobōru Rīgu) was the first season of the nationwide fourth tier of Japanese football, and the 16th season since the establishment of Japan Football League. The first stage of the season commenced from 16 March to 8 June, and the second stage of the season commenced on 19 July, and ended on 9 November, while post-season championship playoffs were held on 23 and 30 November.

Honda FC defeated SP Kyoto FC in the final series, winning their first title since 2008, and fifth in JFL overall. Meanwhile, Renofa Yamaguchi won promotion to J3 League after it has finished 4th in the table and fulfilled all licensing criteria set by J. League.

== Clubs ==
After 10 of 18 teams were set to leave JFL for newly created J3, the league announced that it would suffer a contraction and only 14 teams would participate in 2014. The league would accommodate all winners of the Regional League promotion series and would accept applications from another Regional clubs that are willing to participate in the nationwide league. On 4 December 2013 the league announced the final list of promoted teams.

Club name	Home town	Notes
Azul Claro Numazu	Numazu, Shizuoka	J. League 100 Year Plan club status holders, promoted from Tōkai Soccer League
Fagiano Okayama Next	Okayama, Okayama	2013 Chūgoku Soccer League champions, 2nd place in Regional promotion play-offs
Honda FC	Hamamatsu, Shizuoka	
Kagoshima United	Kagoshima, Kagoshima	A new club, created on merger of Volca Kagoshima and FC Kagoshima, 2013 Kyushu Soccer League respective champions and runners-up
Honda Lock	Miyazaki, Miyazaki	
Maruyasu Okazaki	Okazaki, Aichi	Promoted from Tōkai Soccer League. Renamed from Maruyasu Industries SC
MIO Biwako Shiga	Kusatsu, Shiga	
SP Kyoto FC	Mukō, Kyoto	Renamed from Sagawa Printing SC
Renofa Yamaguchi	Yamaguchi, Yamaguchi	100 Year Plan club, promoted from Chūgoku Soccer League
Sony Sendai	Tagajō, Miyagi	
Tochigi Uva	Tochigi, Tochigi	100 Year Plan club status approved 20 May 2014
Vanraure Hachinohe	Hachinohe, Aomori	100 Year Plan club, promoted from Tohoku Soccer League
Verspah Oita	Ōita, Ōita	Renamed from Hoyo Oita
Yokogawa Musashino	Musashino, Tokyo	

== Change in rules ==
The league will turn to two-stage format, similar to the one J. League had in its early years and is planning to reintroduce in 2015. Two single round-robin stages will be held, and winners of each stage will determine the champion in the post-season home and away championship playoffs. If the same team manages to win both stages, no playoffs will be held, and they will be automatically declared champions.

No relegation is expected to take place in 2014 season, as the league anticipates expansion to 16 teams in 2015.

According to updated J. League Terms, in order to be promoted to J3 League the clubs must comply the following requirements:

- Play in JFL for at least one season before promotion
- Hold a J. League 100 Year Plan club status
- Finish in top 4 of the combined JFL table, and finish either 1st or 2nd among associate members
- Have an average home attendance of at least 2,000; with significant effort recognized toward reaching 3,000 spectators
- Have an annual operating revenue of 150 million yen
- Pass the J3 licensing examination conducted by J. League

== First stage ==
=== Table ===
Pos	Team	Pld	W	D	L	GF	GA	GD	Pts	Qualification or relegation
1	Honda FC (A)	13	11	1	1	36	11	+25	34	Qualification for championship play-offs
2	Kagoshima United	13	11	1	1	23	5	+18	34	
3	SP Kyoto FC	13	9	0	4	21	12	+9	27	
4	Sony Sendai	13	8	2	3	26	12	+14	26	
5	Verspah Oita	13	6	5	2	17	9	+8	23	
6	Renofa Yamaguchi	13	7	1	5	25	13	+12	22	
7	Azul Claro Numazu	13	3	5	5	11	14	−3	14	
8	Yokogawa Musashino	13	3	3	7	14	18	−4	12	
9	Vanraure Hachinohe	13	3	3	7	11	18	−7	12	
10	Fagiano Okayama Next	13	2	5	6	10	22	−12	11	
11	Tochigi Uva	13	2	4	7	9	19	−10	10	
12	Honda Lock	13	2	4	7	11	24	−13	10	
13	MIO Biwako Shiga	13	2	3	8	9	32	−23	9	
14	Maruyasu Okazaki	13	1	5	7	11	25	−14	8	

Updated to match(es) played on 8 June 2014. Source: Japan Football League
Rules for classification: 1) Points; 2) Goal differential; 3) Goals scored; 4) Head-to-head results; 5) Disciplinary points; 6) Draw.
(A) Advance to a further round

=== Results ===
Home \ Away	AZU	FAN	HON	KGU	LOC	MAR	MIO	PRK	REN	SON	UVA	YMC	VAN	VRS
Azul Claro Numazu				0–1	3–0	0–1	0–0	2–1				1–0		
Fagiano Okayama Next	2–2		0–5	0–1						0–2	1–1			0–1
Honda FC	0–0			2–1	2–1		5–0	3–1	3–1			3–1		
Kagoshima United					4–0	1–0	3–0	2–1				4–0	2–1	
Honda Lock		1–1				1–1	2–3	3–1				0–4	0–1	
Maruyasu Okazaki		1–2	1–4							1–2	2–2		1–1	0–1
MIO Biwako Shiga		1–1				2–2		0–1	1–4		1–0	0–3	1–5	
SP Kyoto FC		2–0				3–0			2–1	2–0	1–0		2–0	3–1
Renofa Yamaguchi	1–0	4–0		1–2	1–1	5–0					2–0		2–0	
Sony Sendai	2–0		3–5	0–0	0–1		3–0		1–0			3–1		
Tochigi Uva	2–2		0–2	0–1	2–0					0–5				0–0
Yokogawa Musashino		1–1				1–1		0–1	1–2		0–1		1–0	1–1
Vanraure Hachinohe	1–1	0–2	0–2							0–3 (Note: Round 1 match between Vanraure and Sony was postponed to 17 April due to heavy snow.)	2–1			0–0
Verspah Oita	3–0		2–0	0–1	1–1		3–0		2–1	2–2				

Updated to match(es) played on 8 June 2014. Source: Japan Football League
Legend: Blue = home team win; Yellow = draw; Red = away team win.

== Second stage ==
=== Table ===
Pos	Team	Pld	W	D	L	GF	GA	GD	Pts	Qualification or relegation
1	SP Kyoto FC (A)	13	11	1	1	37	8	+29	34	Qualification for championship play-offs
2	Renofa Yamaguchi	13	9	2	2	26	14	+12	29	
3	Kagoshima United	13	7	2	4	22	14	+8	23	
4	Yokogawa Musashino	13	6	5	2	17	13	+4	23	
5	Sony Sendai	13	5	5	3	19	17	+2	20	
6	Honda FC	13	5	4	4	22	17	+5	19	
7	Vanraure Hachinohe	13	5	3	5	19	14	+5	18	
8	Azul Claro Numazu	13	5	3	5	15	21	−6	18	
9	Honda Lock	13	5	2	6	20	28	−8	17	
10	MIO Biwako Shiga	13	4	1	8	15	18	−3	13	
11	Fagiano Okayama Next	13	3	3	7	14	24	−10	12	
12	Verspah Oita	13	2	4	7	13	19	−6	10	
13	Tochigi Uva	13	2	3	8	7	18	−11	9	
14	Maruyasu Okazaki	13	2	2	9	12	33	−21	8	

Updated to match(es) played on 9 November 2014. Source: Japan Football League
Rules for classification: 1) Points; 2) Goal differential; 3) Goals scored; 4) Head-to-head results; 5) Disciplinary points; 6) Draw.
(A) Advance to a further round

=== Results ===
Home \ Away	AZU	FAN	HON	KGU	LOC	MAR	MIO	PRK	REN	SON	UVA	YMC	VAN	VRS
Azul Claro Numazu		0–0	0–4						3–4	1–2	2–1		3–2	2–1
Fagiano Okayama Next					0–1	6–1	0–4	0–7	0–0			1–2	2–1	
Honda FC		2–0				2–1				2–3	0–1		2–2	2–1
Kagoshima United	0–0	1–2	2–2						0–3	1–0	2–0			2–0
Honda Lock	1–0		3–2	1–4					2–4	0–3	2–1			3–3
Maruyasu Okazaki	1–1			1–5	2–1		1–2	0–4	1–4			0–1		
MIO Biwako Shiga	0–1		1–2	0–2	1–2					1–0				2–1
SP Kyoto FC	4–0		1–0	3–1	2–1		3–1					1–3		
Renofa Yamaguchi			1–1				2–1	1–4		4–1		0–1		1–0
Sony Sendai		3–2				1–1		0–0			2–1		0–0	2–2
Tochigi Uva		1–1				0–2	1–1	0–4	0–1			0–1	1–0	
Yokogawa Musashino	1–2		1–1	0–2	1–1		2–1			2–2				
Vanraure Hachinohe				2–0	5–2	4–1	1–0	0–1	0–1			1–1		
Verspah Oita		1–0				2–0		1–3			0–0	1–1	0–1	

Updated to match(es) played on 9 November 2014. Source: Japan Football League
Legend: Blue = home team win; Yellow = draw; Red = away team win.

== Championship play-offs ==
The championship play-offs was held after the season between two winners of each stage. Honda FC, the winners of the first stage, will host the first leg on 23 November, and SP Kyoto FC who won the second stage will host the second leg on 29 November.

Team 1	Agg.	Team 2	1st leg	2nd leg
Honda FC	5–4	SP Kyoto FC	2–2	3–2

23 November 2014
13:00

Honda FC	2–2	SP Kyoto FC
Hosokai 37'; Harada 71'	Report	6' Kurosu; 84' Saito

Honda Miyakoda Soccer Stadium, Hamamatsu, Shizuoka
Attendance: 1,408
Referee: Shū Kawamata

29 November 2014
13:00

SP Kyoto FC	2–3	Honda FC
Horikawa 5'; Sato 52'	Report	37' Harada; 80' Hosokai; 86' Kurimoto

Nishikyogoku Athletic Stadium, Ukyō-ku, Kyoto
Attendance: 1,288
Referee: Naohito Ogawa

Honda FC won the series 5–4 on aggregate and thus won their 5th JFL title.

== Overall table ==
This table was used to determine J3 promotion candidates. To qualify for promotion, a club must hold a 100 Year Plan status, and finish both in Top-4 of the JFL, and either 1st or 2nd among the promotion-eligible clubs.

On 21 October the J. League has examined clubs in order to determine J3 promotion eligibility. Among existing 100 Year Plan clubs only Azul Claro Numazu and Renofa Yamaguchi passed all tests, making them the only clubs theoretically eligible for promotion.

On 19 November J. League officially admitted Renofa Yamaguchi to participate in next year J3 League.

Pos	Team	Pld	W	D	L	GF	GA	GD	Pts	Promotion or relegation
1	Honda FC (C)	26	16	5	5	58	28	+30	53	
2	SP Kyoto FC	26	20	1	5	58	20	+38	61	
3	Kagoshima United	26	18	3	5	45	19	+26	57	
4	Renofa Yamaguchi (P)	26	16	3	7	51	27	+24	51	Promotion to 2015 J3 League
5	Sony Sendai	26	13	7	6	45	29	+16	46	
6	Yokogawa Musashino	26	9	8	9	31	31	0	35	
7	Verspah Oita	26	8	9	9	30	28	+2	33	
8	Azul Claro Numazu	26	8	8	10	26	35	−9	32	
9	Vanraure Hachinohe	26	8	6	12	30	32	−2	30	
10	Honda Lock	26	7	6	13	31	52	−21	27	
11	Fagiano Okayama Next	26	5	8	13	24	46	−22	23	
12	MIO Biwako Shiga	26	6	4	16	24	50	−26	22	
13	Tochigi Uva	26	4	7	15	16	37	−21	19	
14	Maruyasu Okazaki	26	3	7	16	23	58	−35	16	

Updated to match(es) played on 30 November 2014. Source: Japan Football League
Rules for classification: 1) Points; 2) Goal differential; 3) Goals scored; 4) Head-to-head results; 5) Disciplinary points; 6) Draw.
(C) Champions; (P) Promoted

== Top scorers ==
Rank	Scorer	Club	Goals
1	(Japan) Kazuhito Kishida	Renofa Yamaguchi	17
2	(Japan) Takaki Fukumitsu	Verspah Oita	13
3	(Japan) Yuta Uchino	Sony Sendai	12
4	(Japan) Daiki Kagawa	Honda FC	11
5	(Japan) Kazuma Sato	SP Kyoto FC	10
6	(Japan) Gen Nakamura	Sony Sendai	9
7	(Japan) Akira Akao	Kagoshima United	8
7	(Japan) Noriaki Fujimoto	SP Kyoto FC	8
7	(Japan) Daisuke Kurosu	SP Kyoto FC	8
10	(Japan) Kiichi Iga	Honda FC	7
10	(Japan) Taishi Kusaka	Maruyasu Okazaki	7
10	(Japan) Makoto Nakasuji	Kagoshima United	7
10	(Japan) Tatsuya Saito	MIO Biwako Shiga	7
10	(Japan) Hiroya Yamada	Kagoshima United	7

Source: Japan Football League
Updated to games played on 9 November 2014

== Attendance ==
Pos	Team	Total	High	Low	Average	Change
1	Renofa Yamaguchi	29,856	4,568	701	2,297	+58.4%^{†}
2	Kagoshima United	23,722	3,542	483	1,825	+163.7%^{‡}
3	Azul Claro Numazu	23,096	2,968	309	1,777	+121.0%^{†}
4	Honda FC	13,186	3,116	324	1,014	+34.5%
5	Vanraure Hachinohe	9,918	1,604	230	763	+27.6%^{†}
6	Yokogawa Musashino	9,613	1,227	335	739	−4.0%
7	MIO Biwako Shiga	8,374	1,713	224	644	+18.6%
8	Tochigi Uva	7,017	1,474	215	540	−10.6%
9	Sony Sendai	6,724	920	268	517	−19.6%
10	Fagiano Okayama Next	5,865	759	249	451	n/a^{†}
11	SP Kyoto FC	5,133	626	234	395	−2.5%
12	Honda Lock	4,895	546	222	377	−26.5%
13	Maruyasu Okazaki	4,662	1,176	145	359	n/a^{†}
14	Verspah Oita	4,332	842	154	333	0.0%
	League total	156,393	4,568	145	859	−35.0%

Updated to games played on 9 November 2014
Source: Japan Football League (1st stage, 2nd stage)
Notes:
^{†} Team played previous season in regional leagues.
^{‡}The average attendance of Kagoshima United is compared to combined averages of its predecessors, FC Kagoshima and Volca Kagoshima

== Promotion from regional leagues ==
As the league plans to expand to 16 teams for 2015 season, two promotion slots were available for the winners of the Regional League promotion series. In the final group tournament that took place from 22 to 24 November Nara Club and FC Osaka finished first and second, respectively, and won promotion to 2015 JFL.

Due to promotion of Renofa Yamaguchi to J3 League, one additional promotion spot become available. On 10 December it was awarded to Club Dragons from Kansai League D2 who finished third in the Regional Promotion series.
