= 2013 Japanese Regional Leagues =

Japanese amateur leagues football season

Japanese Regional Leagues
- Season: 2013

The 2013 Japanese Regional Leagues were a competition between parallel association football leagues ranking at the bottom of the Japan Football League.

== Champions list ==
Region	Champions
Hokkaido	Norbritz Hokkaido
Tohoku	Grulla Morioka
Kanto	FC Korea
Hokushinetsu	Saurcos Fukui
Tokai	FC Maruyasu Okazaki
Kansai	FC Osaka
Chūgoku	Fagiano Okayama Next
Shikoku	FC Imabari
Kyushu	Volca Kagoshima

== Hokkaido ==
Pos	Team	Pld	W	D	L	GF	GA	GD	Pts	Qualification or relegation
1	Club Fields Norbritz Hokkaido	14	11	0	3	40	12	+28	33	
2	Tokachi Fairsky Genesis	14	10	2	2	44	16	+28	32	
3	Sapporo University Goal Plunderers	14	9	1	4	41	27	+14	28	
4	Sapporo Football Club	14	7	2	5	32	21	+11	23	
5	Rokkatei Marseitz	14	6	1	7	31	21	+10	19	Disbanded
6	Nippon Steel Kamaishi	14	5	1	8	29	37	−8	16	
7	Imamizawa FC Hokusai	14	1	3	10	20	61	−41	6	
8	Toyota Motor Hokkaido (R)	14	1	2	11	14	56	−42	5	

Source: rsssf.com
(R) Relegated

== Tohoku ==
=== Division 1 ===
Pos	Team	Pld	W	D	L	GF	GA	GD	Pts	Promotion
1	Grulla Morioka (C, P)	18	16	1	1	95	10	+85	49	Promoted to J3
2	Vanraure Hachinohe (P)	18	16	1	1	67	8	+59	49	Promoted to JFL
3	FC Ganju Iwate	18	13	1	4	67	17	+50	40	
4	Cobaltore Onagawa	18	10	2	6	42	29	+13	32	
5	Fuji Club 2003	18	5	2	11	28	52	−24	17	
6	FC Primeiro	18	4	4	10	23	55	−32	16	
7	Morioka Zebra	18	5	1	12	19	60	−41	16	
8	Shiogama N.T.F.C. Wiese	18	4	3	11	25	61	−36	15	
9	Bandits Iwaki FC	18	4	1	13	24	60	−36	13	
10	Akita FC Cambiare	18	3	4	11	19	57	−38	13	

Source: rsssf.com
(C) Champions; (P) Promoted

=== Division 2 North ===
Pos	Team	Pld	W	D	L	GF	GA	GD	Pts	Promotion or relegation
1	ReinMeer Aomori (C, P)	18	16	2	0	53	3	+50	50	Promoted to Division 1
2	Blancdieu Hirosaki FC	18	12	2	4	34	17	+17	38	
3	Omiya Club	18	9	5	4	38	28	+10	32	
4	TDK Shinwakai	18	7	3	8	23	22	+1	24	
5	Nippon Steel Kamaishi	18	7	2	9	28	27	+1	23	
6	FC Fuji 08	18	6	3	9	25	35	−10	21	
7	Mizusawa Club	18	5	5	8	23	26	−3	20	
8	Akita University School of Medicine	18	5	2	11	21	33	−12	17	
9	Hanamaki Club (R)	18	5	2	11	25	44	−19	17	
10	Tono Club (R)	18	3	4	11	15	50	−35	13	

Source: rsssf.com
(C) Champions; (P) Promoted; (R) Relegated

=== Division 2 South ===
Pos	Team	Pld	W	D	L	GF	GA	GD	Pts	Promotion or relegation
1	Merry (C, P)	18	13	1	4	49	20	+29	40	Promoted to Division 1
2	Sendai Nakada FC	18	12	2	4	44	28	+16	38	
3	Sendai Sasuke FC	18	9	2	7	42	35	+7	29	
4	Iwaki Furukawa FC	18	9	1	8	44	33	+11	28	
5	FC Parafrente Yonezawa	18	8	3	7	33	31	+2	27	
6	Soma SC	18	7	5	6	30	24	+6	26	
7	FC Scheinen Fukushima	18	7	3	8	33	33	0	24	
8	Marysol Matsushima SC	18	7	2	9	32	47	−15	23	
9	Nakashinden FC (R)	18	7	1	10	36	36	0	22	
10	Sakata Football Association (R)	18	1	0	17	16	72	−56	3	

Source: rsssf.com
(C) Champions; (P) Promoted; (R) Relegated

== Kantō ==
=== Division 1 ===
Pos	Team	Pld	W	D	L	GF	GA	GD	Pts	Qualification or relegation
1	FC Korea	18	12	4	2	31	14	+17	40	
2	Vertfee Takahara Nasu	18	11	5	2	32	17	+15	38	
3	Tonan Maebashi	18	9	4	5	32	21	+11	31	
4	Tokyo 23 FC	18	9	2	7	50	32	+18	29	
5	Aries FC Tokyo	18	9	2	7	34	23	+11	29	
6	Hitachi Building System	18	6	6	6	26	28	−2	24	
7	Ryutsu Keizai University FC	18	7	3	8	26	34	−8	24	
8	Saitama SC	18	6	5	7	24	31	−7	23	
9	Club Dragons (R)	18	3	0	15	23	54	−31	9	Relegated to Div. 2
10	Toho Titanium SC (R)	18	1	3	14	17	41	−24	6	Relegated to Div. 2

Source: rsssf.com
(R) Relegated

=== Division 2 ===
Pos	Team	Pld	W	D	L	GF	GA	GD	Pts	Promotion or relegation
1	Urayasu FC (P)	18	17	1	0	94	11	+83	52	Promoted to Div. 1
2	Vonds Ichihara (P)	18	12	0	6	45	20	+25	36	Promoted to Div. 1
3	Yokohama Takeru	18	10	2	6	29	30	−1	32	
4	Kanagawa FC	18	8	3	7	30	33	−3	27	
5	JMSDF Atsugi Air Base	18	8	3	7	29	33	−4	27	
6	Nippon Engineering College F.Marinos	18	8	0	10	27	43	−16	24	
7	Sakado City FC	18	6	1	11	29	31	−2	19	
8	Tokio Marine & Nichido Fire Insurance	18	5	4	9	23	30	−7	19	
9	AC Almaleza (R)	18	4	5	9	26	32	−6	17	
10	Mitsubishi Yowa SC (R)	18	2	1	15	15	84	−69	7	

Source: rsssf.com
(P) Promoted; (R) Relegated

== Hokushinetsu ==
=== Division 1 ===
Pos	Team	Pld	W	D	L	GF	GA	GD	Pts	Qualification or relegation
1	Saurcos Fukui	14	12	2	0	43	7	+36	38	
2	Japan Soccer College	14	10	2	2	53	12	+41	32	
3	Artista Tomi	14	10	1	3	43	9	+34	31	
4	FC Antelope Shiojiri	14	5	2	7	17	36	−19	17	
5	FC Hokuriku	14	4	2	8	16	34	−18	14	
6	Valiente Toyama	14	3	2	9	18	37	−19	11	
7	Toyama Shinjo Club	14	2	4	8	17	36	−19	10	Relegated to Div. 2
8	Teihens FC	14	1	3	10	12	48	−36	6	Relegated to Div. 2

Source: rsssf.com

=== Division 2 ===
Pos	Team	Pld	W	D	L	GF	GA	GD	Pts	Promotion or relegation
1	FC Ueda Gentian (P)	14	12	0	2	65	13	+52	36	Promoted to Div. 1
2	Sakai Phoenix (P)	14	9	2	3	50	25	+25	29	Promoted to Div. 1
3	'09 Keidai FC	14	6	3	5	36	26	+10	21	
4	AS Jamineiro	14	6	2	6	27	22	+5	20	
5	FC Abies	14	6	2	6	27	34	−7	20	
6	Nagaoka Billboard FC	14	6	0	8	34	45	−11	18	
7	CUPS Seiro (R)	14	5	0	9	28	36	−8	15	
8	Granscena Niigata FC (R)	14	1	1	12	6	72	−66	4	

Source: rsssf.com
(P) Promoted; (R) Relegated

== Tōkai ==
=== Division 1 ===
Pos	Team	Pld	W	D	L	GF	GA	GD	Pts	Promotion or qualification
1	FC Maruyasu Okazaki (P, Q)	14	9	1	4	26	15	+11	28	Promoted to JFL
2	FC Gifu SECOND	14	9	0	5	28	16	+12	27	
3	F.C. Kariya	14	8	1	5	35	21	+14	25	
4	Azul Claro Numazu (P)	14	8	1	5	20	21	−1	25	Promoted to JFL
5	Toyota Shukyudan	14	7	1	6	29	26	+3	22	
6	FC Suzuka Rampole	14	6	2	6	22	24	−2	20	
7	Fujieda City Hall SC	14	3	0	11	17	27	−10	9	
8	Yazaki Valente	14	3	0	11	14	41	−27	9	

Source: rsssf.com
(P) Promoted; (Q) Qualified for the phase indicated

=== Division 2 ===
Pos	Team	Pld	W	D	L	GF	GA	GD	Pts	Promotion
1	Nagoya SC	14	12	1	1	41	9	+32	37	Promoted to Div. 1
2	Chukyo University FC	14	9	3	2	41	14	+27	30	Promoted to Div. 1
3	Tokoha University FC	14	6	3	5	24	20	+4	21	
4	Kasugai Club	14	6	3	5	17	29	−12	21	
5	Ise YAMATO FC	14	4	3	7	21	27	−6	15	
6	FC Kawasaki	14	3	5	6	18	30	−12	14	
7	Nagara Club	14	2	4	8	17	26	−9	10	
8	JTEKT Soccer Club	14	2	2	10	17	41	−24	8	

Source: rsssf.com

== Kansai ==
=== Division 1 ===
Pos	Team	Pld	W	D	L	GF	GA	GD	Pts	Qualification or relegation
1	FC Osaka	14	12	2	0	38	7	+31	38	
2	Amitie SC	14	9	2	3	31	11	+20	29	
3	Lagend Shiga FC	14	8	2	4	24	14	+10	26	
4	Banditonce Kakogawa	14	7	4	3	23	13	+10	25	
5	Nara Club	14	3	4	7	11	22	−11	13	
6	Arterivo Wakayama	14	4	1	9	16	35	−19	13	
7	AS.Laranja Kyoto (R)	14	2	2	10	10	26	−16	8	Relegated to Div. 2
8	Ain Foods (R)	14	2	1	11	12	37	−25	7	Relegated to Div. 2

Source: rsssf.com
(R) Relegated

=== Division 2 ===
Pos	Team	Pld	W	D	L	GF	GA	GD	Pts	Promotion or relegation
1	Kansai FC 2008 (P)	14	10	2	2	51	13	+38	32	Promoted to Div. 1
2	Hannan University FC (P)	14	10	2	2	34	14	+20	32	Promoted to Div. 1
3	Diablossa Takada FC	14	7	2	5	28	15	+13	23	
4	Panasonic Energy Sumoto FC	14	6	3	5	24	30	−6	21	Disbanded
5	Kyoto Shiko Club	14	4	3	7	25	36	−11	15	
6	Takasago Mineiro	14	4	1	9	18	34	−16	13	
7	Kwansei Gakuin University SC	14	3	3	8	14	29	−15	12	
8	Biwako SC Hira (R)	14	3	2	9	23	35	−12	11	

Source: rsssf.com
(P) Promoted; (R) Relegated

== Chūgoku ==
Pos	Team	Pld	W	D	L	GF	GA	GD	Pts	Promotion or relegation
1	Fagiano Okayama Next (P, Q)	18	15	2	1	53	10	+43	47	Promoted to JFL
2	Dezzolla Shimane	18	14	1	3	64	6	+58	43	
3	Renofa Yamaguchi FC (P, Q)	18	13	3	2	53	13	+40	42	Promoted to JFL
4	Matsue City FC	18	7	4	7	39	34	+5	25	
5	NTN Okayama	18	7	1	10	33	45	−12	22	
6	Fuji Xerox Hiroshima S.C.	18	6	2	10	30	54	−24	20	
7	Mitsubishi Motors Mizushima FC	18	4	5	9	26	37	−11	17	
8	Sagawa Chūgoku SC	18	4	5	9	22	39	−17	17	
9	SRC Hiroshima	18	4	4	10	25	64	−39	16	
10	JX Nippon Oil & Energy Mizushima FC	18	1	2	15	18	61	−43	5	

Source: rsssf.com
(P) Promoted; (Q) Qualified for the phase indicated

== Shikoku ==
Pos	Team	Pld	W	D	L	GF	GA	GD	Pts	Qualification or relegation
1	F.C. Imabari	14	13	1	0	72	7	+65	40	
2	Nangoku Kochi FC	14	8	5	1	39	16	+23	29	
3	Kochi University Torastar FC	14	9	1	4	69	18	+51	28	
4	Tadotsu FC	14	5	2	7	26	44	−18	17	
5	R.Velho Takamatsu	14	4	4	6	19	21	−2	16	
6	llamas Kochi FC	14	4	4	6	20	34	−14	16	
7	Minami Club	14	2	1	11	10	63	−53	7	
8	Celeste (R)	14	2	0	12	18	70	−52	6	Relegated

Source: rsssf.com
(R) Relegated

== Kyushu ==
Pos	Team	Pld	W	PKW	PKL	L	GF	GA	GD	Pts	Result
1	Volca Kagoshima (P)	18	15	1	1	1	76	13	+63	48	Promoted to JFL as one club (Kagoshima United FC)
2	FC Kagoshima (P)	18	15	0	1	2	81	13	+68	46	Promoted to JFL as one club (Kagoshima United FC)
3	Nippon Steel Corp. Oita	18	12	0	0	6	57	28	+29	36	
4	FC Nankatsu	18	6	2	3	7	23	33	−10	25	
5	Kaiho Bank SC	18	5	3	3	7	27	45	−18	24	
6	Kyushu Mitsubishi Motors	18	6	1	2	9	26	38	−12	22	
7	Mitsubishi Heavy Industrial Nagasaki SC	18	5	2	1	10	33	41	−8	20	
8	Saga LIXIL F.C.	18	3	3	3	9	18	30	−12	18	
9	FC Naha	18	4	2	2	10	20	45	−25	18	
10	Kyushu SSC FC (R)	18	2	3	1	12	25	95	−70	13	Relegated

Source: rsssf.com
(P) Promoted; (R) Relegated
