= Toyoki Hasegawa =

Japanese footballer

Personal information
- Date of birth: April 18, 1986 (age 40)
- Place of birth: Kumamoto, Japan
- Height: 1.76 m (5 ft 9 1/2 in)
- Position: Midfielder

Team information
- Current team: Verspah Oita
- Number: 26

Youth career
- 2002–2005: Luther Junior & Senior; High School

Senior career*
Years	Team	Apps	(Gls)
2005–2008	Sagan Tosu	82	(4)
2009–	Verspah Oita		
- * Club domestic league appearances and goals as of December 31, 2015

Toyoki Hasegawa (長谷川 豊喜, Hasegawa Toyoki; born April 18, 1986) was a Japanese football player he is currently assistant manager Japan Football League club Verspah Oita.

Hasegawa previously played for Sagan Tosu in the J2 League.

== Club statistics ==
Club performance			League		Cup		Total	
Season	Club	League	Apps	Goals	Apps	Goals	Apps	Goals
Japan			League		Emperor's Cup		Total	
2005	Sagan Tosu	J2 League	21	3	1	0	22	3
2006	Sagan Tosu	J2 League	39	1	2	0	41	1
2007	Sagan Tosu	J2 League	12	0	0	0	12	0
2008	Sagan Tosu	J2 League	10	0	1	0	11	0
Total			82	4	4	0	86	4
