= Shizuoka Sangyo University SC =

Japanese football club

Shizuoka Sangyo University F.C.
- Full name: Shizuoka Sangyo University; Football Club
- Founded: 1994; 31 years ago
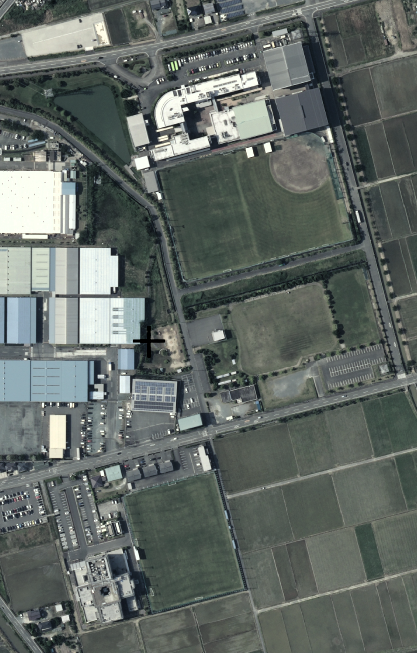
- Ground: Shizuoka, Japan

Shizuoka Sangyo University Football Club is a Japanese football club based in Shizuoka. The club has played in Japan Football League.

== Ladies team ==
The SSU's women's football team, known as Iwata Bonita, was originally affiliated with Júbilo Iwata and wore their colors but now wears SSU's green uniform colors.
