= 2016 Japan Football League =

Japan Football League
- Season: 2016
- Champions: Honda FC
- Promoted: Azul Claro Numazu
- Relegated: Fagiano Okayama Next (withdrew)
- Matches played: 240
- Goals scored: 628 (2.62 per match)
- Top goalscorer: Makoto Kawanishi; FC Osaka (21 goals)
- Highest attendance: 4,675
- Lowest attendance: 158
- Average attendance: 817

The 2016 Japan Football League (Japanese: 第18回日本フットボールリーグ, Hepburn: Dai Jūkyūhachi-kai Nihon Futtobōru Rīgu) was the third season of the nationwide fourth tier of Japanese football, and the 18th season since the establishment of Japan Football League.

== Clubs ==
Sixteen clubs participated in this season of Japan Football League. The list was announced on 9 December 2015. A place for 2016 Emperor's Cup will be given to the winners of the first stage of the 2016 JFL.

| Club name | Home town | Notes |
|---|---|---|
| Azul Claro Numazu | Numazu, Shizuoka | J.League 100 Year Plan club status holders, J3 license holders |
| Briobecca Urayasu | Urayasu, Chiba | Promoted from Kantō League Div. 1 after 2nd place in 39th Regional Promotion Series |
| Fagiano Okayama Next | Okayama, Okayama | |
| Honda FC | Hamamatsu, Shizuoka | |
| Honda Lock | Miyazaki, Miyazaki | |
| Maruyasu Okazaki | Okazaki, Aichi | |
| MIO Biwako Shiga | Kusatsu, Shiga | |
| Nara Club | Nara, Nara | J.League 100 Year Plan club status and J3 license holders |
| FC Osaka | Osaka, Osaka | |
| ReinMeer Aomori | Aomori, Aomori | Promoted from Tohoku League Div. 1 after 1st place in 39th Regional Promotion Series |
| Ryutsu Keizai Dragons | Ryūgasaki, Ibaraki | |
| Sony Sendai | Tagajō, Miyagi | Defending champions of 2015 |
| Tokyo Musashino City | Musashino, Tokyo | Formerly Yokogawa Musashino FC, J.League 100 Year Plan club status holders |
| Tochigi Uva | Tochigi, Tochigi | J.League 100 Year Plan club status holders |
| Vanraure Hachinohe | Hachinohe, Aomori | J.League 100 Year Plan club status holders |
| Verspah Oita | Ōita, Ōita | |

== Change in rules ==
The tournament continued with the system introduced in 2014: Two single round-robin stages are held, and winners of each stage determine the champion in the post-season home and away championship playoffs. If the same team manages to win both stages, no playoffs will be held, and they will be automatically declared champions.

The two worst performing teams by aggregated results of both stages are relegated to the Regional Leagues and replaced by the top two performers of the Regional League promotion series. However, if one or two teams are admitted to J3 or withdrawn at the end of the season, the number of relegated clubs are reduced accordingly.

According to updated J.League Terms, the clubs must comply the following requirements to be promoted to J3 League:

- Play in JFL for at least one season before promotion
- Hold a J.League 100 Year Plan club status
- Finish in top 4 of the combined JFL table and finish either 1st or 2nd among associate members.
- Have an average home attendance of at least 2,000; with significant effort recognized toward reaching 3,000 spectators
- Have an annual operating revenue of 150 million yen
- Pass the J3 licensing examination conducted by J.League

== First stage ==
| Pos | Team | Pld | W | D | L | GF | GA | GD | Pts | Qualification |
|---|---|---|---|---|---|---|---|---|---|---|
| 1 | Ryutsu Keizai Dragons | 15 | 11 | 2 | 2 | 30 | 14 | +16 | 35 | Qualification to championship play-offs |
| 2 | FC Osaka | 15 | 10 | 2 | 3 | 28 | 14 | +14 | 32 | |
| 3 | Azul Claro Numazu | 15 | 9 | 2 | 4 | 21 | 11 | +10 | 29 | |
| 4 | Honda Lock | 15 | 7 | 5 | 3 | 18 | 10 | +8 | 26 | |
| 5 | Vanraure Hachinohe | 15 | 7 | 4 | 4 | 19 | 10 | +9 | 25 | |
| 6 | Honda FC | 15 | 7 | 4 | 4 | 21 | 16 | +5 | 25 | |
| 7 | Sony Sendai | 15 | 6 | 5 | 4 | 24 | 15 | +9 | 23 | |
| 8 | MIO Biwako Shiga | 15 | 7 | 1 | 7 | 19 | 23 | −4 | 22 | |
| 9 | Briobecca Urayasu | 15 | 6 | 1 | 8 | 19 | 22 | −3 | 19 | |
| 10 | Tokyo Musashino City | 15 | 5 | 4 | 6 | 10 | 14 | −4 | 19 | |
| 11 | ReinMeer Aomori | 15 | 4 | 5 | 6 | 15 | 17 | −2 | 17 | |
| 12 | Maruyasu Okazaki | 15 | 5 | 2 | 8 | 10 | 15 | −5 | 17 | |
| 13 | Verspah Oita | 15 | 3 | 7 | 5 | 13 | 18 | −5 | 16 | |
| 14 | Nara Club | 15 | 3 | 5 | 7 | 17 | 25 | −8 | 14 | |
| 15 | Tochigi Uva | 15 | 3 | 1 | 11 | 19 | 42 | −23 | 10 | |
| 16 | Fagiano Okayama Next | 15 | 2 | 0 | 13 | 10 | 27 | −17 | 6 | |

Source: JFL website (in Japanese)
Rules for classification: 1) Points; 2) Goal difference; 3) Goals scored; 4) Head-to-head results; 5) Disciplinary points; 6) Draw

== Second stage ==
| Pos | Team | Pld | W | D | L | GF | GA | GD | Pts | Qualification |
|---|---|---|---|---|---|---|---|---|---|---|
| 1 | Honda FC | 15 | 11 | 3 | 1 | 31 | 13 | +18 | 36 | Qualification to championship play-offs |
| 2 | Sony Sendai | 15 | 11 | 1 | 3 | 32 | 12 | +20 | 34 | |
| 3 | Honda Lock | 15 | 10 | 3 | 2 | 28 | 13 | +15 | 33 | |
| 4 | Azul Claro Numazu | 15 | 9 | 3 | 3 | 26 | 13 | +13 | 30 | |
| 5 | ReinMeer Aomori | 15 | 9 | 1 | 5 | 20 | 16 | +4 | 28 | |
| 6 | FC Osaka | 15 | 8 | 2 | 5 | 24 | 17 | +7 | 26 | |
| 7 | Nara Club | 15 | 7 | 2 | 6 | 24 | 23 | +1 | 23 | |
| 8 | Vanraure Hachinohe | 15 | 6 | 3 | 6 | 15 | 17 | −2 | 21 | |
| 9 | Ryutsu Keizai Dragons | 15 | 5 | 4 | 6 | 23 | 24 | −1 | 19 | |
| 10 | MIO Biwako Shiga | 15 | 4 | 6 | 5 | 19 | 22 | −3 | 18 | |
| 11 | Briobecca Urayasu | 15 | 5 | 2 | 8 | 20 | 25 | −5 | 17 | |
| 12 | Tokyo Musashino City | 15 | 4 | 4 | 7 | 19 | 24 | −5 | 16 | |
| 13 | Verspah Oita | 15 | 3 | 6 | 6 | 17 | 24 | −7 | 15 | |
| 14 | Maruyasu Okazaki | 15 | 2 | 7 | 6 | 13 | 23 | −10 | 13 | |
| 15 | Tochigi Uva | 15 | 2 | 0 | 13 | 15 | 35 | −20 | 6 | |
| 16 | Fagiano Okayama Next | 15 | 0 | 1 | 14 | 9 | 34 | −25 | 1 | |

Updated to match(es) played on 13 November 2016. Source: JFL website (in Japanese)
Rules for classification: 1) Points; 2) Goal difference; 3) Goals scored; 4) Head-to-head results; 5) Disciplinary points; 6) Draw

== Championship play-offs ==
The championship play-offs were held after the season between two winners of each stage. Ryutsu Keizai Dragons, the winners of the first stage, hosted the first leg on 26 November, and Honda FC who won the second stage hosted the second leg on 4 December.

| Team 1 | Agg. | Team 2 | 1st leg | 2nd leg |
|---|---|---|---|---|
| Ryutsu Keizai Dragons | 2–3 | Honda FC | 2–2 | 0–1 |

26 November 2016
13:00

| Ryutsu Keizai Dragons | 2 – 2 | Honda FC |
|---|---|---|
| | Report |

Kashiwanoha Park Stadium, Kashiwa
Attendance: 1,131

4 December 2016
13:00

| Honda FC | 1 – 0 | Ryutsu Keizai Dragons |
|---|---|---|
| | Report |

Honda Miyakoda Soccer Stadium, Hamamatsu
Attendance: 1,596

== Overall table ==
This table is used to determine J3 promotion candidates. To qualify for promotion, a club must hold a 100 Year Plan status, obtain J3 license (marked in bold in the table), and finish both in the top 4 of the JFL, and either 1st or 2nd among the promotion-eligible clubs.

| Pos | Team | Pld | W | D | L | GF | GA | GD | Pts | Qualification |
|---|---|---|---|---|---|---|---|---|---|---|
| 1 | Honda FC (C) | 30 | 18 | 7 | 5 | 52 | 29 | +23 | 61 | |
| 2 | Ryutsu Keizai Dragons | 30 | 16 | 6 | 8 | 53 | 38 | +15 | 54 | |
| 3 | **Azul Claro Numazu** (P) | 30 | 18 | 5 | 7 | 47 | 24 | +23 | 59 | Promotion to 2017 J3 League (Note: To qualify for promotion, a club must hold a 100 Year Plan status, obtain J3 license (marked in bold in the table), and finish both in the top 4 of the JFL, and either 1st or 2nd among the promotion-eligible clubs.) |
| 4 | Honda Lock | 30 | 17 | 8 | 5 | 46 | 23 | +23 | 59 | |
| 5 | FC Osaka | 30 | 18 | 4 | 8 | 52 | 31 | +21 | 58 | |
| 6 | Sony Sendai | 30 | 17 | 6 | 7 | 56 | 27 | +29 | 57 | |
| 7 | Vanraure Hachinohe | 30 | 13 | 7 | 10 | 34 | 27 | +7 | 46 | |
| 8 | ReinMeer Aomori | 30 | 13 | 6 | 11 | 35 | 33 | +2 | 45 | |
| 9 | MIO Biwako Shiga | 30 | 11 | 7 | 12 | 38 | 45 | −7 | 40 | |
| 10 | **Nara Club** | 30 | 10 | 7 | 13 | 41 | 48 | −7 | 37 | |
| 11 | Briobecca Urayasu | 30 | 11 | 3 | 16 | 39 | 47 | −8 | 36 | |
| 12 | Tokyo Musashino City | 30 | 9 | 8 | 13 | 29 | 38 | −9 | 35 | |
| 13 | Verspah Oita | 30 | 6 | 13 | 11 | 30 | 42 | −12 | 31 | |
| 14 | Maruyasu Okazaki | 30 | 7 | 9 | 14 | 23 | 38 | −15 | 30 | |
| 15 | Tochigi Uva | 30 | 5 | 1 | 24 | 34 | 77 | −43 | 16 | |
| 16 | Fagiano Okayama Next | 30 | 2 | 1 | 27 | 19 | 61 | −42 | 7 | Withdrew after the season |

Updated to match(es) played on 13 November 2016. Source: JFL website (in Japanese)
Rules for classification: 1) Points; 2) Goal difference; 3) Goals scored; 4) Head-to-head results; 5) Disciplinary points; 6) Draw
(C) Champions; (P) Promoted

== Top scorers ==
| Rank | Scorer | Club | Goals |
|---|---|---|---|
| 1 | (Japan) Makoto Kawanishi | FC Osaka | 21 |
| 2 | (Japan) Jun Arima | Sony Sendai | 19 |
| 3 | (Japan) Koki Takenaka | Briobecca Urayasu | 17 |
| 4 | (Japan) Taira Shige | Nara Club | 15 |
| 5 | (Japan) Takuma Sonoda | Azul Claro Numazu | 12 |
| 6 | (Japan) Yuta Uchino | Sony Sendai | 11 |
| 6 | (Japan) Kazuki Sakamoto | MIO Biwako Shiga | 11 |
| 6 | (Japan) Kengo Kubo | MIO Biwako Shiga | 11 |
| 6 | (Japan) Toshihiko Uchiyama | Tochigi Uva | 11 |
| 10 | (Japan) Seiya Murakami | Vanraure Hachinohe | 10 |
| 10 | (Japan) Tatsuya Furuhashi | Honda FC | 10 |
| 10 | (Japan) Takanori Yokochi | Ryutsu Keizai Dragons | 10 |

Updated to games played on 13 November 2016.
Source: JFL Stats & Data - Ranking:Goals (in Japanese)

== Attendance ==
| Pos | Team | Total | High | Low | Average | Change |
|---|---|---|---|---|---|---|
| 1 | Azul Claro Numazu | 34,975 | 6,874 | 848 | 2,332 | +6.1% |
| 2 | Vanraure Hachinohe | 26,317 | 5,028 | 792 | 1,754 | +80.1% |
| 3 | Nara Club | 22,620 | 2,620 | 1,140 | 1,508 | −17.0% |
| 4 | FC Osaka | 13,446 | 1,416 | 511 | 896 | +29.5% |
| 5 | Tokyo Musashino City | 12,789 | 1,653 | 302 | 853 | +4.4% |
| 6 | Honda FC | 11,908 | 1,517 | 438 | 794 | −25.9% |
| 7 | Sony Sendai | 10,963 | 4,675 | 278 | 731 | +36.9% |
| 8 | ReinMeer Aomori | 10,564 | 1,518 | 350 | 704 | +207.4%^{†} |
| 9 | MIO Biwako Shiga | 10,195 | 1,810 | 253 | 680 | −23.9% |
| 10 | Verspah Oita | 7,324 | 928 | 206 | 488 | 0.0% |
| 11 | Briobecca Urayasu | 7,217 | 952 | 211 | 481 | n/a^{†} |
| 12 | Tochigi Uva | 6,025 | 1,043 | 151 | 402 | −11.8% |
| 13 | Ryutsu Keizai Dragons | 5,813 | 851 | 193 | 388 | +6.3% |
| 14 | Maruyasu Okazaki | 5,733 | 634 | 243 | 382 | +10.4% |
| 15 | Honda Lock | 5,576 | 741 | 178 | 372 | +4.5% |
| 16 | Fagiano Okayama Next | 4,653 | 517 | 158 | 310 | +0.3% |
| | League total | 196,118 | 6,874 | 151 | 817 | −8.6% |

Updated to games played on 13 November
Source: Japan Football League (1st stage, 2nd stage)
Notes:
^{†} Team played previous season in Regional Leagues.

== Promotion from Regional Leagues ==
FC Imabari and Veertien Mie
