= Honda Miyakoda Soccer Stadium =

Football stadium in Hamamatsu, Japan

Coordinates: 34°48′38.3″N 137°43′20.6″E

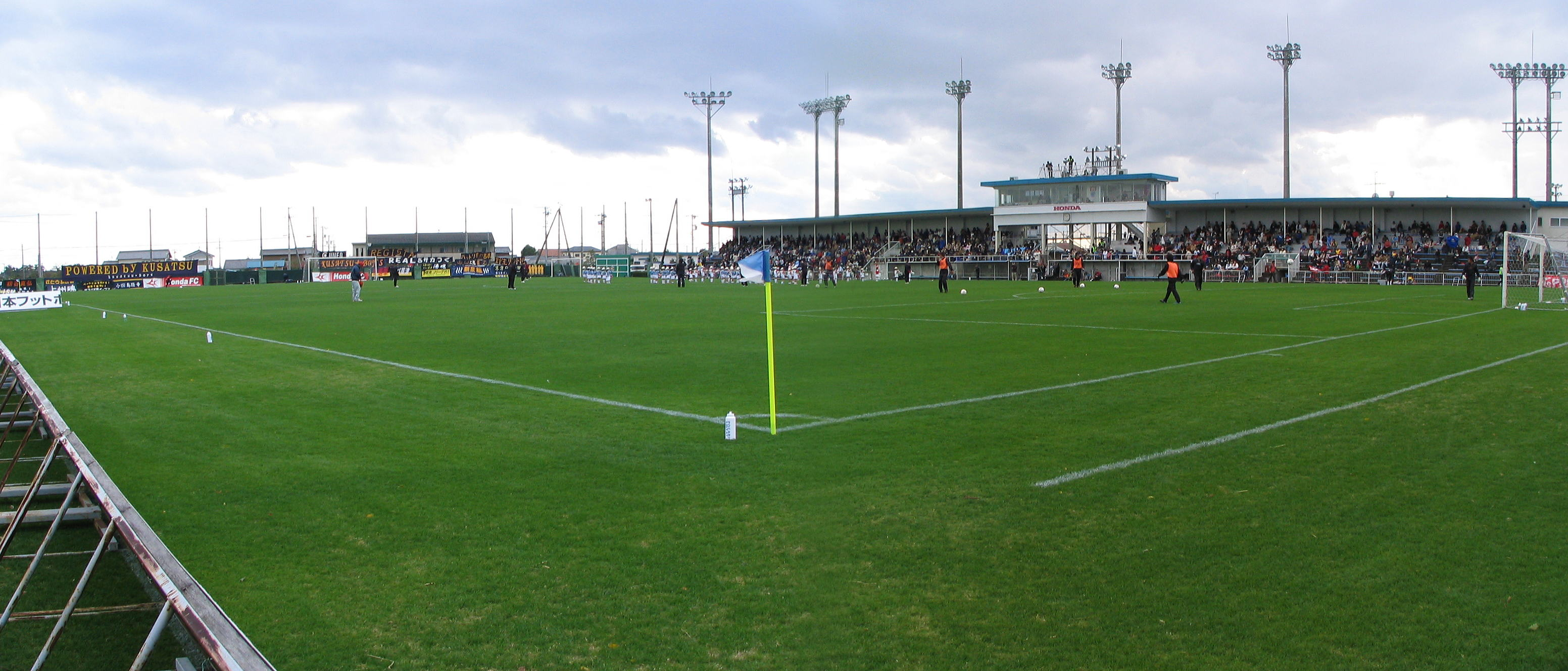
- Interactive map of Honda Miyakoda Soccer Stadium
- Location: Hamana-ku, Hamamatsu, Japan
- Owner: Honda Motor Company
- Capacity: 2,506
- Surface: Grass

Construction
- Opened: 1996

Tenant
- Honda F.C. (Japan Football League)

Honda Miyakoda Soccer Stadium is a stadium located in Hamana-ku, Hamamatsu. It is owned by the Honda Motor Company a is the home ground of Honda F.C. in the Japan Football League. The stadium has a capacity for 2,506 spectators.
