= 2017 Japan Football League =

Japan Football League
- Season: 2017
- Champions: Honda FC
- Relegated: Tochigi Uva FC; Briobecca Urayasu
- Matches: 240
- Goals: 669 (2.79 per match)
- Top goalscorer: Shusuke Sakamoto; Nara Club (18 goals)
- Highest attendance: 5,241; FC Imabari v Verspah Oita (10 September 2017)
- Lowest attendance: 100; Honda Lock SC
- Average attendance: 797

The 2017 Japan Football League (Japanese: 第19回日本フットボールリーグ, Hepburn: Dai Jūkyū-kai Nihon Futtobōru Rīgu) was the fourth season of the nationwide fourth tier of Japanese football, and the 19th season since the establishment of Japan Football League.

== Clubs ==
Azul Claro Numazu leave from Japan Football League after promotion to J3 League for upcoming season after finished third place in 2016 season.

Veertien Mie and FC Imabari promoted from Regional Leagues for the first time in their history. Imabari return to fourth tier since 2011.

Sixteen clubs participated in this season of Japan Football League. The list was announced on 16 January 2017.

| Club name | Home town | Kit Manufacturer | Notes |
|---|---|---|---|
| Briobecca Urayasu | Urayasu, Chiba | Nike | |
| FC Imabari | Imabari, Ehime | Adidas | J.League 100 Year Plan club status holders Promoted from Shikoku Soccer League after 1st place in 40th Regional Promotion Series |
| Honda FC | Hamamatsu, Shizuoka | Umbro | Defending champions of 2016 |
| Honda Lock | Miyazaki, Miyazaki | Kappa | |
| Maruyasu Okazaki | Okazaki, Aichi | Penalty | |
| MIO Biwako Shiga | Kusatsu, Shiga | Nike | |
| Nara Club | All cities/towns in Nara (Note: centering on Nara) | Squadra | J.League 100 Year Plan club status and J3 license holders |
| FC Osaka | All cities/towns in Osaka | Mitre | |
| ReinMeer Aomori | Aomori, Aomori | Under Armour | |
| Ryutsu Keizai Dragons | Ryūgasaki, Ibaraki | Adidas | |
| Sony Sendai | Tagajō, Miyagi | Umbro | |
| Tokyo Musashino City | Musashino, Tokyo | Yonex | J.League 100 Year Plan club status holders |
| Tochigi Uva | Tochigi, Tochigi | Mitre | J.League 100 Year Plan club status holders |
| Vanraure Hachinohe | Eastern cities/towns in Aomori (Note: Hachinohe, Towada, Gonohe, Sannohe, Takko, Hashikami, Nanbu, Shingo, Oirase, Misawa, Shichinohe, Rokunohe, Tohoku, Noheji, Yokohama, Rokkasho) | Athleta | J.League 100 Year Plan club status and J3 license holders |
| Veertien Mie | All cities/towns in Mie (Note: centering on Kuwana & Yokkaichi) | Mizuno | Promoted from Tōkai Adult Soccer League Div. 1 after 2nd place in 40th Regional Promotion Series |
| Verspah Oita | Yufu & Ōita, Ōita | Warrix Sports | |

== League table ==
| Pos | Team | Pld | W | D | L | GF | GA | GD | Pts | Qualification |
|---|---|---|---|---|---|---|---|---|---|---|
| 1 | Honda FC (C) | 30 | 21 | 7 | 2 | 72 | 20 | +52 | 70 | (Note: To qualify for promotion, a club must hold a 100 Year Plan status, obtain J3 license (marked in bold in the table), and finish both in the top 4 of the JFL, and either 1st or 2nd among the promotion-eligible clubs.) |
| 2 | ReinMeer Aomori | 30 | 17 | 10 | 3 | 44 | 28 | +16 | 61 | |
| 3 | Sony Sendai | 30 | 18 | 5 | 7 | 64 | 36 | +28 | 59 | |
| 4 | FC Osaka | 30 | 16 | 7 | 7 | 59 | 32 | +27 | 55 | |
| 5 | **Vanraure Hachinohe** | 30 | 15 | 6 | 9 | 41 | 31 | +10 | 51 | |
| 6 | **FC Imabari** | 30 | 12 | 12 | 6 | 54 | 36 | +18 | 48 | |
| 7 | **Nara Club** | 30 | 10 | 10 | 10 | 41 | 51 | −10 | 40 | |
| 8 | Honda Lock | 30 | 9 | 7 | 14 | 36 | 46 | −10 | 34 | |
| 9 | Maruyasu Okazaki | 30 | 9 | 7 | 14 | 35 | 46 | −11 | 34 | |
| 10 | Ryutsu Keizai Dragons | 30 | 8 | 10 | 12 | 38 | 51 | −13 | 34 | |
| 11 | Tokyo Musashino City | 30 | 8 | 9 | 13 | 44 | 47 | −3 | 33 | |
| 12 | Veertien Mie | 30 | 7 | 8 | 15 | 35 | 46 | −11 | 29 | |
| 13 | MIO Biwako Shiga | 30 | 6 | 9 | 15 | 33 | 51 | −18 | 27 | |
| 14 | Verspah Oita | 30 | 5 | 12 | 13 | 27 | 46 | −19 | 27 | |
| 15 | Briobecca Urayasu (R) | 30 | 6 | 8 | 16 | 24 | 46 | −22 | 26 | Relegation to 2018 Regional Leagues |
| 16 | Tochigi Uva (R) | 30 | 5 | 9 | 16 | 22 | 56 | −34 | 24 | Relegation to 2018 Regional Leagues |

Updated to match(es) played on 13 November 2017. Source: JFL website (in Japanese)
Rules for classification: 1) Points; 2) Goal difference; 3) Goals scored; 4) Head-to-head results; 5) Disciplinary points; 6) Draw
(C) Champions; (R) Relegated

== Season statistics ==
=== Top scorers ===
As of match played 13 November 2017.

| Rank | Player | Club | Goals |
|---|---|---|---|
| 1 | (Japan) Shusuke Sakamoto | Nara Club | 18 |
| 2 | (Japan) Ryota Kuwajima | FC Imabari | 17 |
| 2 | (Japan) Jun Arima | Sony Sendai FC | 17 |
| 4 | (Japan) Shogo Omachi | Honda FC | 16 |
| 5 | (Japan) Koji Ishihara | Tokyo Musashino City FC | 15 |
| 6 | (Japan) Tatsuya Furuhashi | Honda FC | 14 |
| 7 | (Japan) Yuta Uchino | Sony Sendai FC | 13 |
| 8 | (Japan) Makoto Kawanishi | FC Osaka | 12 |
| 9 | (Japan) Taichi Nakamura | ReinMeer Aomori | 11 |
| 10 | (Japan) Junki Yokono | ReinMeer Aomori | 10 |
| 10 | (Japan) Shogo Fujimaki | Veertien Mie | 10 |
| 10 | (Japan) Junya Kitano | Veertien Mie | 10 |

== Attendances ==
| Pos | Team | Total | High | Low | Average | Change |
|---|---|---|---|---|---|---|
| 1 | FC Imabari | 32,724 | 5,241 | 764 | 2,182 | n/a^{†} |
| 2 | Vanraure Hachinohe | 31,596 | 4,122 | 719 | 2,106 | +20.1% |
| 3 | Nara Club | 21,703 | 2,868 | 763 | 1,447 | −4.0% |
| 4 | Honda FC | 12,915 | 1,504 | 477 | 861 | +8.4% |
| 5 | Veertien Mie | 11,879 | 1,343 | 242 | 792 | n/a^{†} |
| 6 | ReinMeer Aomori | 10,819 | 2,098 | 353 | 721 | +2.4% |
| 7 | Tokyo Musashino City | 10,595 | 1,438 | 307 | 706 | −17.2% |
| 8 | MIO Biwako Shiga | 9,771 | 1,955 | 191 | 651 | −4.3% |
| 9 | FC Osaka | 8,960 | 1,523 | 232 | 597 | −33.4% |
| 10 | Briobecca Urayasu | 7,579 | 1,049 | 234 | 505 | +5.0% |
| 11 | Verspah Oita | 6,108 | 746 | 223 | 407 | −16.6% |
| 12 | Maruyasu Okazaki | 5,911 | 703 | 159 | 394 | +3.1% |
| 13 | Tochigi Uva | 5,844 | 1,116 | 179 | 390 | −3.0% |
| 14 | Sony Sendai | 5,298 | 566 | 171 | 353 | −51.7% |
| 15 | Honda Lock | 4,930 | 746 | 100 | 329 | −11.6% |
| 16 | Ryutsu Keizai Dragons | 4,644 | 691 | 137 | 310 | −20.1% |
| | League total | 191,276 | 5,241 | 100 | 797 | −2.4% |

Updated to games played on 3 December
Source: Japan Football League (1st stage, 2nd stage)
Notes:
^{†} Team played previous season in Regional Leagues.

== Promotion from Regional Leagues ==
Cobaltore Onagawa and Tegevajaro Miyazaki
