= Ryutsu Keizai Dragons Ryugasaki =

Japanese football club

Ryutsu Keizai Dragons Ryugasaki 流通経済大学ドラゴンズ龍ヶ崎
- Full name: Ryutsu Keizai Dragons Ryugasaki
- Nickname: Dragons
- Founded: 2001; 25 years ago
- Ground: Ryugasaki Athletic Stadium; Ryūgasaki, Ibaraki
- Capacity: 2,162
- Manager: (Japan) Hiroyuki Suzuki
- League: Kantō Soccer League Div. 1
- 2024: Div. 2, 1st of 10 (Champions and Promoted)
- Website: www.rku-fc.jp
Home colours	Away colours

Ryutsu Keizai Dragons Ryugasaki (流通経済大学ドラゴンズ龍ヶ崎, Ryūtsū Keizai Doragonsu Ryūgasaki) also known as RKD Ryūgasaki are a Japanese football club based in Ryūgasaki, Ibaraki Prefecture. They currently compete in the Kantō Soccer League Division 1, an amateur league in the country that corresponds to Japan's 5th-tier league. Their team colours are grey and navy after the colours of Ryutsu Keizai University, the institution they are affiliated with as satellite team.

== History ==
Founded in 2001 as Ryugasaki FC, the team started competing in the lower divisions of the Ibaraki Prefecture Leagues. Although established as an independent NPO, the club was mainly made up of student players from Ryutsu Keizai University and acted as a farm team for Ryutsu Keizai University, which at the time played in the Kanto University League and joined the JFL in 2005.

In 2003, the club renamed itself Club Dragons (クラブ・ドラゴンズ). In 2005, they earned promotion to the Kantō Soccer League Division 2, won the championship right away, and have been competing in Kantō League D1 since 2006. They were relegated twice, in 2010 and 2013, but both times spent only one season in Division 2 before bouncing back.

In 2014, the Dragons made it to the final of the Shakaijin Cup, earning a spot in the Regional League promotion series , even though they had played the season in the second division of the Kantō League. They secured third place in the promotion tournament and were officially promoted to the 2015 Japan Football League. With their promotion, the club decided to rename themselves Ryutsu Keizai Dragons Ryugasaki starting in 2015.

In 2019, RKU Dragons Ryugasaki were relegated to the Japanese Regional Leagues starting in 2020, following a five-year run in the JFL.

In 2023, after finishing in 10th place in Kanto Division 1, they were relegated to Kanto Division 2. They spent only the 2024 season in Division 2, earning promotion back to Division 1 as champions. However, after finishing in ninth place in the 2025 season, they were relegated once again to Division 2.

== League and cup record ==
Champions	Runners-up	Third place	Promoted	Relegated

League												Emperor's Cup
Season	Division	Pos.	P	W	D	L	F	A	GD	Pts	Attendance/G	Emperor's Cup
2005	Ibaraki Prefecture Division	4th	14	7	4	3	24	14	10	25		
2006	Ibaraki Prefecture Division	1st	12	9	2	1	43	17	26	29		
2007	Kantō Soccer League (Div.2)	1st	14	10	2	2	47	16	31	32		
2008	Kantō Soccer League (Div.1)	4th	14	5	3	6	33	27	6	18		
2009	Kantō Soccer League (Div.1)	3rd	14	9	1	4	27	16	11	28		
2010	Kantō Soccer League (Div.1)	7th	14	5	2	7	15	29	-14	17		
2011	Kanto Division 2	3rd	14	9	1	4	23	14	9	28		
2012	Kanto Division 1	8th	18	6	2	10	29	36	-7	20		
2013	Kanto Division 1	9th	18	3	0	15	23	54	-31	9		
2014	Kanto Division 2	2nd	18	10	3	5	42	31	11	33		
2015	JFL	14th	30	6	3	21	27	62	-35	21	365	
2016	JFL	2nd	30	16	6	8	53	38	15	54	388	
2017	JFL	10th	30	8	10	12	38	51	-13	34	310	
2018	JFL	15th	30	4	7	19	20	52	-32	19	460	2nd round
2019	JFL	16th	30	5	6	19	35	75	-40	21	309	
2020 †	Kanto Division 1	7th	9	3	0	6	18	14	4	9		
2021	Kanto Division 1	7th	22	8	2	12	24	34	-10	26		
2022	Kanto Division 1	9th	18	4	6	8	21	29	-8	18		
2023	Kanto Division 1	10th	18	0	1	17	6	48	-42	1		
2024	Kanto Division 2	1st	18	13	3	2	37	14	23	42		
2025	Kanto Division 1	9th	18	4	2	12	22	35	-13	14		
2026	Kanto Division 2	TBD	18									

Key

- Pos. = Position in league; P = Games played; W = Games won; D = Games drawn; L = Games lost; F = Goals for; A = Goals against; GD = Goal difference; Pts = Points gained
- † Number of games played reduced by COVID-19 worldwide pandemic

== Honours ==
Ryutsu Keizai Dragons Ryugasaki honours
Honour	No.	Years
Ibaraki Prefecture Division 1	1	2006
Kantō Soccer League Division 2	2	2007, 2024
Japan Football League Apertura Champions	1	2016
Ibaraki Prefectural Football Championship Emperor's Cup Ibaraki Prefectural Qualifiers	1	2018

== Current squad ==
Updated to October 21st, 2024.

Note: Flags indicate national team as defined under FIFA eligibility rules; some limited exceptions apply. Players may hold more than one non-FIFA nationality.

No.	Pos.	Nation	Player
1	GK	JPN	Genki Kojima
2	DF	JPN	Tamaki Kaito
3	DF	JPN	Taishi Nemoto
4	DF	JPN	Mori Shunto
5	DF	JPN	Hagiwara Seiya
8	MF	JPN	Riku Nonaka
9	MF	JPN	Shota Yamaga
11	FW	JPN	Shintoku Kuniyoshi
12	DF	JPN	Mashun Okura
13	FW	JPN	Kosei Tsuruta
15	MF	JPN	Asahi Horiuchi
16	MF	JPN	Joei Kawamoto
18	DF	JPN	Hikaru Sakamoto
19	DF	JPN	Yuta Saito
20	MF	JPN	Kyota Kobayashi
21	GK	JPN	Hayanobu Awano
23	FW	JPN	Kohei Hosono
24	FW	JPN	Yunari Ishikawa
25	DF	JPN	Ryotaro Okamoto
26	DF	JPN	Kafu Okawa

No.	Pos.	Nation	Player
27	DF	JPN	Tsuzuki Shunta
28	MF	JPN	Atsuki Yano
29	FW	JPN	Reo Asai
30	FW	JPN	Koike Shota
32	DF	JPN	Toshiyuki Fujii
33	MF	JPN	Mahiro Okano
34	MF	JPN	Hantani Ichita
36	FW	JPN	Hiromu Chiba
37	FW	JPN	Jigen Tanaka
38	DF	JPN	Rikiya Takahashi
39	FW	JPN	Hiroto Nakamura
40	MF	JPN	Tomoya Kai
42	DF	JPN	Koji Oyama
43	DF	JPN	Mitsuki Tajima
44	MF	JPN	Kota Kanazawa
45	MF	JPN	Seiryu Hadano
46	DF	JPN	Momoki Tanaka
47	MF	JPN	Genki Hirano
48	MF	JPN	Yudai Suzuki
49	MF	JPN	Shin Takehara
