= 2015 Japan Football League =

Japan Football League
- Season: 2015
- Champions: Sony Sendai 1st JFL title 1st D4 title
- Promoted: Kagoshima United
- Matches played: 240
- Goals scored: 614 (2.56 per match)
- Top goalscorer: Kiichi Iga (17 goals)
- Highest attendance: 8,656 (Kagoshima United vs Maruyasu Okazaki, 15 November)
- Lowest attendance: 122 (Fagiano Okayama Next vs RK Dragons, 23 October)
- Average attendance: 894

The 2015 Japan Football League (Japanese: 第17回日本フットボールリーグ, Hepburn: Dai Jūnana-kai Nihon Futtobōru Rīgu) was the second season of the nationwide fourth tier of Japanese football, and the 17th season since the establishment of Japan Football League. The first stage of the season was played from 8 March to 7 June, and the second stage of the season from 20 June to 15 November, while post-season championship playoffs were held on 29 November and 5 December.

== Clubs ==
Sixteen clubs will participate in this second season of Japan Football League. The list was announced on 16 January. A place for 2015 Emperor's Cup will be given to the winners of the first stage of the JFL 2015.

Club name	Home town	Notes
Azul Claro Numazu	Numazu, Shizuoka	J. League 100 Year Plan club status holders, J3 license holders
Fagiano Okayama Next	Okayama, Okayama	
Honda FC	Hamamatsu, Shizuoka	Defending champions of 2014
Kagoshima United	Kagoshima, Kagoshima	J. League 100 Year Plan club status holders, J3 license holders
Honda Lock	Miyazaki, Miyazaki	
Maruyasu Okazaki	Okazaki, Aichi	
MIO Biwako Shiga	Kusatsu, Shiga	
Nara Club	Nara, Nara	Promoted from Kansai League Div. 1 after 1st place in 38th Regional Promotion Series and J. League 100 Year Plan club status and J3 license holders
FC Osaka	Osaka, Osaka	Promoted from Kansai League Div. 1 after 2nd place in 38th Regional Promotion Series
Ryutsu Keizai Dragons	Ryūgasaki, Ibaraki	Promoted from Kantō League Div. 2 after 3rd place in 38th Regional Promotion Series
SP Kyoto FC	Mukō, Kyoto	Formerly Sagawa Printing Kyoto
Sony Sendai	Tagajō, Miyagi	
Tochigi Uva	Tochigi, Tochigi	J. League 100 Year Plan club status holders
Vanraure Hachinohe	Hachinohe, Aomori	J. League 100 Year Plan club status holders
Verspah Oita	Ōita, Ōita	
Yokogawa Musashino	Musashino, Tokyo	

On 29 October SP Kyoto FC announced their withdrawal from JFL at the end of the season.

== Change in rules ==
The tournament will continue with the system introduced in 2014: Two single round-robin stages will be held, and winners of each stage will determine the champion in the post-season home and away championship playoffs. If the same team manages to win both stages, no playoffs will be held, and they will be automatically declared champions.

The two worst teams by aggregated results of both stages were relegated to the Regional Leagues and replaced by the top two performers of the Regional League promotion series. However, if one or two teams would be admitted to J3 or withdrawn at the end of the season, the number of relegated clubs would be reduced accordingly. As a result of SP Kyoto FC's withdrawal, no club was relegated.

According to updated J.League Terms, the clubs must comply the following requirements to be promoted to J3 League:

- Play in JFL for at least one season before promotion
- Hold a J. League 100 Year Plan club status
- Finish in top 4 of the combined JFL table, and finish either 1st or 2nd among associate members.
- Have an average home attendance of at least 2,000; with significant effort recognized toward reaching 3,000 spectators
- Have an annual operating revenue of 150 million yen
- Pass the J3 licensing examination conducted by J.League

== First stage ==
Pos	Team	Pld	W	D	L	GF	GA	GD	Pts	Qualification
1	Vanraure Hachinohe (Q)	15	10	4	1	21	8	+13	34	Qualification to championship play-offs
2	Sony Sendai	15	10	4	1	22	11	+11	34	
3	Honda FC	15	10	3	2	31	9	+22	33	
4	Kagoshima United	15	9	3	3	20	11	+9	30	
5	FC Osaka	15	9	2	4	26	11	+15	29	
6	Azul Claro Numazu	15	8	4	3	17	12	+5	28	
7	Nara Club	15	6	5	4	14	13	+1	23	
8	SP Kyoto FC	15	7	1	7	24	14	+10	22	
9	Honda Lock	15	5	4	6	16	21	−5	19	
10	MIO Biwako Shiga	15	4	6	5	18	17	+1	18	
11	Verspah Oita	15	5	3	7	21	27	−6	18	
12	Yokogawa Musashino	15	5	2	8	15	18	−3	17	
13	Ryutsu Keizai Dragons	15	3	1	11	16	31	−15	10	
14	Maruyasu Okazaki	15	2	3	10	10	26	−16	9	
15	Tochigi Uva	15	2	2	11	12	27	−15	8	
16	Fagiano Okayama Next	15	1	1	13	7	34	−27	4	

Updated to match(es) played on 7 June 2015. Source: JFL website (in Japanese)
Rules for classification: 1) Points; 2) Goal difference; 3) Goals scored; 4th) head-to-head results; 5th) disciplinary points; 6th) draw
(Q) Qualified for the phase indicated

== Second stage ==
Pos	Team	Pld	W	D	L	GF	GA	GD	Pts	Qualification
1	Sony Sendai (Q)	15	11	4	0	26	10	+16	37	Qualification to championship play-offs
2	Honda FC	15	11	2	2	42	13	+29	35	
3	Kagoshima United	15	9	3	3	26	14	+12	30	
4	SP Kyoto FC	15	7	7	1	27	12	+15	28	
5	Azul Claro Numazu	15	8	2	5	19	16	+3	26	
6	Vanraure Hachinohe	15	7	4	4	15	13	+2	25	
7	Nara Club	15	7	2	6	19	15	+4	23	
8	Honda Lock	15	6	3	6	15	16	−1	21	
9	Verspah Oita	15	5	4	6	19	20	−1	19	
10	MIO Biwako Shiga	15	5	1	9	18	24	−6	16	
11	Fagiano Okayama Next	15	5	1	9	18	25	−7	16	
12	FC Osaka	15	4	3	8	19	24	−5	15	
13	Yokogawa Musashino	15	3	4	8	16	22	−6	13	
14	Maruyasu Okazaki	15	4	0	11	17	35	−18	12	
15	Tochigi Uva	15	3	2	10	17	34	−17	11	
16	Ryutsu Keizai Dragons	15	3	2	10	11	31	−20	11	

Updated to match(es) played on 15 November 2015. Source: JFL website (in Japanese)
Rules for classification: 1) Points; 2) Goal difference; 3) Goals scored; 4th) head-to-head results; 5th) disciplinary points; 6th) draw
(Q) Qualified for the phase indicated

== Championship play-offs ==
The championship play-offs will be held after the season between two winners of each stage. Vanraure Hachinohe, the winners of the first stage, hosted the first leg on 29 November, and Sony Sendai who won the second stage hosted the second leg on 5 December.

Team 1	Agg.	Team 2	1st leg	2nd leg
Vanraure Hachinohe	1–1 (4–5 p)	Sony Sendai	1–0	0–1

29 November 2015
13:00

Vanraure Hachinohe	1 – 0	Sony Sendai
Nakasuji 69'	Report

Gonohe Hibarino Park Athletics Stadium, Gonohe, Aomori
Attendance: 1,635

5 December 2015
13:00

Sony Sendai	1 – 0 (a.e.t.)	Vanraure Hachinohe
Murata 69'	Report
Penalties
	5–4

Yurtec Stadium Sendai, Sendai, Miyagi
Attendance: 1,715

== Overall table ==
This table was used to determine J3 promotion candidates. To qualify for promotion, a club must hold a 100 Year Plan status, obtain J3 license, and finish both in the top 4 of the JFL, and either 1st or 2nd among the promotion-eligible clubs.

On 25 September J.League has awarded J3 licenses for 2016 season. Among JFL clubs, only Kagoshima United, Azul Claro Numazu, and Nara Club received the licenses.

On 17 November J.League officially promoted Kagoshima United to next year's J3 League.

Pos	Team	Pld	W	D	L	GF	GA	GD	Pts	Promotion or relegation
1	Sony Sendai (C)	30	21	8	1	48	21	+27	71	
2	Vanraure Hachinohe	30	17	8	5	36	21	+15	59	
3	Honda FC	30	21	5	4	73	22	+51	68	
4	Kagoshima United (P)	30	18	6	6	46	25	+21	60	Promotion to 2016 J3 League
5	Azul Claro Numazu	30	16	6	8	36	28	+8	54	
6	SP Kyoto FC	30	14	8	8	51	26	+25	50	Withdrawn
7	Nara Club	30	13	7	10	33	28	+5	46	
8	FC Osaka	30	13	5	12	45	35	+10	44	
9	Honda Lock	30	11	7	12	31	37	−6	40	
10	Verspah Oita	30	10	7	13	40	47	−7	37	
11	MIO Biwako Shiga	30	9	7	14	36	41	−5	34	
12	Yokogawa Musashino	30	8	6	16	31	40	−9	30	
13	Maruyasu Okazaki	30	6	3	21	27	61	−34	21	
14	Ryutsu Keizai Dragons	30	6	3	21	27	62	−35	21	
15	Fagiano Okayama Next	30	6	2	22	25	59	−34	20	
16	Tochigi Uva	30	5	4	21	29	61	−32	19	

Updated to match(es) played on 15 November 2015. Source: JFL website (in Japanese)
Rules for classification: 1) Points; 2) Goal difference; 3) Goals scored; 4) head-to-head results; 5) disciplinary points; 6) draw
Winners of each stage will be ranked 1st and 2nd based on the championship results regardless of their total points.
(C) Champions; (P) Promoted

== Top scorers ==
Rank	Scorer	Club	Goals
1	Kiichi Iga	Honda FC	17
2	Hiroki Kurimoto	Honda FC	13
2	Yu Kijima	Verspah Oita	13
4	Daiki Kagawa	Honda FC	12
5	Yuya Yamada	Kagoshima United FC	11
6	Jun Arima	Sony Sendai	10
6	Ryota Nakamura	FC Osaka	10
8	Taiki Kato	SP Kyoto FC	9
8	Noriaki Fujimoto	SP Kyoto FC	9
8	Makoto Kawanishi	FC Osaka	9

Updated to games played on 15 November 2015
Source: JFL Stats & Data - Ranking:Goals (in Japanese)

== Attendance ==
Pos	Team	Total	High	Low	Average	Change
1	Kagoshima United	39,361	8,656	1,093	2,624	+43.8%
2	Azul Claro Numazu	32,970	8,337	558	2,198	+23.7%
3	Nara Club	27,250	3,466	812	1,817	+52.2%^{†}
4	Honda FC	16,067	3,317	495	1,071	+5.6%
5	Vanraure Hachinohe	14,610	1,493	555	974	+27.7%
6	MIO Biwako Shiga	13,414	2,541	388	894	+38.8%
7	Yokogawa Musashino	12,255	2,305	438	817	+10.6%
8	FC Osaka	10,386	1,568	291	692	+31.6%^{†}
9	Sony Sendai	8,015	967	258	534	+3.3%
10	Verspah Oita	7,327	1,226	210	488	+46.5%
11	Tochigi Uva	6,842	1,208	277	456	−15.6%
12	Ryutsu Keizai Dragons	5,476	511	226	365	n/a^{†}
13	SP Kyoto FC	5,454	918	203	364	−7.8%
14	Honda Lock	5,341	785	183	356	−5.6%
15	Maruyasu Okazaki	5,191	787	223	346	−3.6%
16	Fagiano Okayama Next	4,634	475	122	309	−31.5%
	League total	214,593	8,656	122	894	+5.5%

Updated to games played on 15 November 2015
Source: Japan Football League (1st stage, 2nd stage) (in Japanese)
Notes:
^{†} Team played previous season in Regional Leagues.

== Promotion from Regional Leagues ==
Due to SP Kyoto's resignation and Kagoshima's promotion, two promotion slots were available for the winners of the Regional League promotion series. In the final group tournament that took place from 21 to 23 November ReinMeer Aomori and Briobecca Urayasu finished first and second, respectively, and won promotion to 2016 JFL.
