= SP Kyoto FC =

SP Kyoto FC SP京都FC
- Full name: SP Kyoto Football Club
- Nickname(s): SP Kyoto FC
- Founded: 1986
- Dissolved: 2015
- Ground: Taiyogaoka Stadium; Uji, Kyoto
- Capacity: 7,000
- 2015: Japan Football League, 6th (resigned)
Home colours	Away colours

SP Kyoto FC (SP京都FC, SP Kyoto Football Club) was a Japanese football club based in Muko, Kyoto, Japan. They played for the last time in Japan Football League for 2015 season.

== History ==
The club was founded in 1986 and started to compete in the Kyoto Prefecture Division 4. They were promoted to Division 1 in 1999 and again to the Kansai Regional League in 2000. They won the League in 2004 and got promoted to the JFL after beating Shizuoka Sangyo University in the play-off. All the players are the employees of Sagawa Printing, a printing company with historical links to the Sagawa Express shipping company.

The name was changed from Sagawa Printing Soccer Club to Sagawa Printing Kyoto Soccer Club in 2014.

The name was changed from Sagawa Printing Kyoto Soccer Club to SP Kyoto Football Club in 2015. The team was disbanded at the end of 2015 season.

== Last squad ==
As of 26 October 2015. Note: Flags indicate national team as defined under FIFA eligibility rules; some limited exceptions apply. Players may hold more than one non-FIFA nationality.

No.	Pos.	Nation	Player
1	GK	JPN	Tetsuya Yamaoka
2	DF	JPN	Ryuma Shima
3	DF	JPN	Daiki Oizumi
4	DF	JPN	Tatsuya Ikeda
5	DF	JPN	Hiroto Sakai
6	MF	JPN	Yoshiki Nakai
7	MF	JPN	Shun Aso
8	DF	JPN	Ryoichi Kanai
9	FW	JPN	Noriaki Fujimoto
10	MF	JPN	Kenich Yoshiki
11	FW	JPN	Koya Iwasaki
13	FW	JPN	Hiroki Minobe

No.	Pos.	Nation	Player
14	FW	JPN	Tomomasa Horikawa
15	MF	JPN	Kazuma Sato
16	DF	JPN	Shinsaku Mochidome
17	FW	JPN	Daisuke Kurosu
18	MF	JPN	Jun Usami
19	MF	JPN	Taiki Kato
20	MF	JPN	Ryo Harada
21	GK	JPN	Akihito Ozawa
22	DF	JPN	Hiroaki Takahashi
23	DF	JPN	Yuzirou Haraguchi
25	DF	JPN	Kengo Nakamura
31	GK	JPN	Jun Kurosawa

== Honours ==
- Kansai Soccer League
  - Champions (1): 2002
- Japan Football League
  - Clausura Champions (1): 2014

== Results in JFL ==
2003: 15th
2004: 12th
2005: 11th
2006: 15th
2007: 12th
2008: 11th
2009: 9th
2010: 6th
2011: 12th
2012: 7th
2013: 6th
2014: 2nd
2015: 6th
