= Fagiano Okayama Next =

Japanese football club

Fagiano Okayama Next ファジアーノ岡山ネクスト
- Full name: Fagiano Okayama Next
- Founded: 2009; 16 years ago
- Dissolved: 2016
- Ground: Kanko Stadium
- Capacity: 20,000
- Chairman: Masaaki Kimura
- Manager: Tatsuya Makiuchi
- League: Japan Football League
- 2016: Japan Football League, 16th
- Website: http://www.fagiano-okayama.com/club/next_team_current.html

Fagiano Okayama Next (ファジアーノ岡山ネクスト, Fagiano Okayama Next) was a Japanese football team based in Okayama, Okayama Prefecture. They played in the Japan Football League, the fourth-tier of Japanese nationwide football leagues and the top level of amateur football in the country.

== History ==
The club was established in 2009 after Fagiano Okayama won the promotion to J. League in order to give more practice to youngsters and reserve players of the senior team. They began to play in the Okayama Prefectural league and soon afterward they won the championship and promotion to the Chugoku Regional League.

In 2012 they won third place in the All Japan Senior Football Championship and therefore participated in the Regional League promotion series but finished only fourth in the final group. The following year they won the Chugoku league and finished second in the Regional League promotion series, thus earning the right to play in the Japan Football League in 2014.
