= 2017 Fukushima United FC season =

Fukushima United FC
2017 season
- Manager: Kazuaki Tasaka
- Stadium: Toho Stadium
- J3 League: 10th
Home colours	Away colours

This article gives a summary of teams, attendance numbers and final game scores from the Fukushima United FC 2017 football season.

== Squad ==
As of 15 February 2017. Note: Flags indicate national team as defined under FIFA eligibility rules; some limited exceptions apply. Players may hold more than one non-FIFA nationality.

No.	Pos.	Nation	Player
2	DF	JPN	Ryota Okada
3	DF	JPN	Takuya Osanai
4	MF	JPN	Ryu Kawakami
5	MF	JPN	Takumi Watanabe
6	MF	JPN	Takashi Kamoshida
7	MF	JPN	Hiroto Mogi
8	MF	JPN	Kazuto Ishido
9	FW	BRA	Alex
10	MF	KOR	Kim Kong-chyong
11	FW	JPN	Shota Tamura
13	MF	JPN	Shuhei Mitsuhashi
14	MF	JPN	Kota Hoshi

No.	Pos.	Nation	Player
15	MF	JPN	Shuto Hira
16	GK	JPN	Daiki Hotta
17	MF	JPN	Naoki Maeda
18	MF	JPN	Yuki Hashimoto
20	MF	BRA	Renan
21	GK	JPN	Dai Okada
24	MF	JPN	Shota Hasunuma
25	DF	JPN	Kento Sugino
27	MF	JPN	Takuto Hashimoto
30	DF	JPN	Takaaki Kinoshita
34	GK	JPN	Tomoyasu Naito
40	FW	JPN	Hiroki Higuchi

== J3 League ==
=== League table ===
Pos	Team	Pld	W	D	L	GF	GA	GD	Pts
7	Fujieda MYFC	32	12	11	9	50	43	+7	47
8	Kataller Toyama	32	13	8	11	37	33	+4	47
9	Giravanz Kitakyushu	32	13	7	12	44	37	+7	46
10	Fukushima United	32	13	4	15	39	43	−4	43
11	FC Tokyo U-23	32	12	7	13	36	47	−11	43
12	SC Sagamihara	32	9	12	11	34	41	−7	39
13	Cerezo Osaka U-23	32	8	11	13	39	43	−4	35

Source: 2017 MEIJI YASUDA J3 LEAGUE League table
Rules for classification: 1) Points; 2) Goal difference; 3) Goals scored; 4th) head-to-head results; 5th) disciplinary points; 6th) draw

=== Match details ===
J3 League match details
Match	Date	Team	Score	Team	Venue	Attendance
1	2017.03.11	YSCC Yokohama	0-2	Fukushima United FC	NHK Spring Mitsuzawa Football Stadium	1,145
2	2017.03.18	Azul Claro Numazu	1-2	Fukushima United FC	Ashitaka Park Stadium	3,089
3	2017.03.26	Fukushima United FC	1-0	FC Ryukyu	Toho Stadium	1,637
4	2017.04.02	AC Nagano Parceiro	0-1	Fukushima United FC	Minami Nagano Sports Park Stadium	4,323
5	2017.04.16	Fukushima United FC	1-1	SC Sagamihara	Toho Stadium	1,341
6	2017.04.30	Fukushima United FC	0-1	Gamba Osaka U-23	Toho Stadium	1,329
7	2017.05.07	Kataller Toyama	2-0	Fukushima United FC	Toyama Stadium	3,933
8	2017.05.14	Fukushima United FC	0-2	Blaublitz Akita	Toho Stadium	1,494
9	2017.05.21	Tochigi SC	2-1	Fukushima United FC	Tochigi Green Stadium	4,120
10	2017.05.28	Gainare Tottori	1-2	Fukushima United FC	Chubu Yajin Stadium	1,626
11	2017.06.04	Fukushima United FC	1-2	Fujieda MYFC	Toho Stadium	1,172
12	2017.06.10	Kagoshima United FC	2-1	Fukushima United FC	Kagoshima Kamoike Stadium	2,949
13	2017.06.18	Fukushima United FC	0-3	Giravanz Kitakyushu	Toho Stadium	1,304
14	2017.06.25	Grulla Morioka	5-1	Fukushima United FC	Iwagin Stadium	1,516
16	2017.07.08	Fukushima United FC	2-2	FC Tokyo U-23	Toho Stadium	1,322
17	2017.07.16	Fukushima United FC	3-2	Cerezo Osaka U-23	Aizu Athletic Park Stadium	1,419
18	2017.07.22	Fujieda MYFC	2-0	Fukushima United FC	Fujieda Soccer Stadium	1,264
19	2017.08.19	FC Ryukyu	2-1	Fukushima United FC	Okinawa Athletic Park Stadium	6,888
20	2017.08.27	Fukushima United FC	0-0	Azul Claro Numazu	Toho Stadium	3,897
21	2017.09.03	SC Sagamihara	2-1	Fukushima United FC	Sagamihara Gion Stadium	3,538
22	2017.09.09	Giravanz Kitakyushu	0-1	Fukushima United FC	Mikuni World Stadium Kitakyushu	4,727
23	2017.09.17	Fukushima United FC	2-0	Gainare Tottori	Toho Stadium	629
24	2017.09.24	Cerezo Osaka U-23	2-1	Fukushima United FC	Kincho Stadium	543
25	2017.10.01	Fukushima United FC	2-0	AC Nagano Parceiro	Toho Stadium	1,427
26	2017.10.08	Fukushima United FC	0-1	Kataller Toyama	Shonan BMW Stadium Hiratsuka	1,284
27	2017.10.15	Gamba Osaka U-23	1-2	Fukushima United FC	Suita City Football Stadium	523
28	2017.10.22	Fukushima United FC	0-2	Tochigi SC	Toho Stadium	1,456
29	2017.10.28	FC Tokyo U-23	1-1	Fukushima United FC	Ajinomoto Field Nishigaoka	864
31	2017.11.11	Fukushima United FC	3-1	Kagoshima United FC	Toho Stadium	642
32	2017.11.19	Blaublitz Akita	2-1	Fukushima United FC	Akigin Stadium	2,381
33	2017.11.26	Fukushima United FC	3-0	YSCC Yokohama	Toho Stadium	1,203
34	2017.12.03	Fukushima United FC	3-1	Grulla Morioka	Toho Stadium	2,206
