= 2016 Fukushima United FC season =

Fukushima United FC
2016 season
- Manager: Keisuke Kurihara
- Stadium: Toho Stadium
- J3 League: 14th
Home colours	Away colours

2016 Fukushima United FC season.

== Squad ==
As of 22 February 2016. Note: Flags indicate national team as defined under FIFA eligibility rules; some limited exceptions apply. Players may hold more than one non-FIFA nationality.

No.	Pos.	Nation	Player
2	DF	JPN	Ryota Okada
3	DF	JPN	Akihiro Noda
4	DF	JPN	Kenta Togawa
5	MF	JPN	Takumi Watanabe
6	MF	JPN	Takashi Kamoshida
7	FW	JPN	Hiroto Mogi
8	MF	JPN	Kazuto Ishido
9	FW	BRA	Alex
10	MF	KOR	Kim Kong-chyong
11	FW	KOR	Kim Hong-yeon
14	MF	JPN	Kota Hoshi
15	DF	JPN	Takuya Muraoka
17	DF	JPN	Goson Sakai

No.	Pos.	Nation	Player
20	MF	JPN	Naoki Maeda
21	GK	JPN	Dai Okada
22	FW	BRA	Rodrigo Tiuí
23	DF	BRA	Paulão
24	MF	JPN	Shota Hasunuma
25	DF	JPN	Kento Sugino
26	DF	JPN	Takuya Osanai
27	MF	JPN	Takuto Hashimoto
28	DF	JPN	Shota Fukuoka
33	GK	JPN	Kei Uemura
34	GK	JPN	Tomoyasu Naito
40	FW	JPN	Hiroki Higuchi

== J3 League ==
=== League table ===
Pos	Team	Pld	W	D	L	GF	GA	GD	Pts
11	SC Sagamihara	30	9	8	13	29	46	−17	35
12	Cerezo Osaka U-23	30	8	8	14	38	47	−9	32
13	Grulla Morioka	30	6	12	12	43	47	−4	30
14	Fukushima United	30	7	9	14	35	44	−9	30
15	Gainare Tottori	30	8	6	16	30	47	−17	30
16	YSCC Yokohama	30	5	5	20	15	51	−36	20

Updated to match(es) played on 20 November 2016. Source: 2016 MEIJI YASUDA J3 LEAGUE League table
Rules for classification: 1) Points; 2) Goal difference; 3) Goals scored; 4th) head-to-head results; 5th) disciplinary points; 6th) draw

=== Match details ===
J3 League match details
Match	Date	Team	Score	Team	Venue	Attendance
1	2016.03.13	Fukushima United FC	1-1	Blaublitz Akita	Toho Stadium	2,136
2	2016.03.20	Kataller Toyama	1-1	Fukushima United FC	Toyama Stadium	4,055
3	2016.04.03	Fukushima United FC	0-1	SC Sagamihara	Toho Stadium	1,230
4	2016.04.10	Fukushima United FC	2-1	Tochigi SC	Toho Stadium	2,122
6	2016.04.24	Fukushima United FC	1-1	Fujieda MYFC	Toho Stadium	1,045
7	2016.05.01	Kagoshima United FC	1-0	Fukushima United FC	Kagoshima Kamoike Stadium	3,097
8	2016.05.08	Fukushima United FC	2-2	Cerezo Osaka U-23	Toho Stadium	2,232
9	2016.05.15	AC Nagano Parceiro	2-1	Fukushima United FC	Minami Nagano Sports Park Stadium	3,794
10	2016.05.22	Fukushima United FC	1-1	FC Ryukyu	Toho Stadium	1,077
11	2016.05.29	YSCC Yokohama	0-2	Fukushima United FC	NHK Spring Mitsuzawa Football Stadium	978
5	2016.06.05	Oita Trinita	1-0	Fukushima United FC	Oita Bank Dome	5,408
12	2016.06.12	Fukushima United FC	3-1	Grulla Morioka	Toho Stadium	1,097
13	2016.06.19	Gainare Tottori	1-3	Fukushima United FC	Chubu Yajin Stadium	1,706
14	2016.06.26	Fukushima United FC	1-1	Gamba Osaka U-23	Toho Stadium	1,522
15	2016.07.03	FC Tokyo U-23	1-1	Fukushima United FC	Komazawa Olympic Park Stadium	2,902
16	2016.07.10	Fukushima United FC	1-2	Kagoshima United FC	Toho Stadium	1,554
17	2016.07.16	Fukushima United FC	1-1	Kataller Toyama	Aizu Athletic Park Stadium	1,154
18	2016.07.24	Gamba Osaka U-23	1-0	Fukushima United FC	Suita City Football Stadium	1,552
19	2016.07.31	SC Sagamihara	1-0	Fukushima United FC	Sagamihara Gion Stadium	3,110
20	2016.08.07	Fukushima United FC	1-4	Oita Trinita	Toho Stadium	1,146
21	2016.09.11	FC Ryukyu	2-3	Fukushima United FC	Okinawa Athletic Park Stadium	1,115
22	2016.09.18	Fukushima United FC	1-0	AC Nagano Parceiro	Shonan BMW Stadium Hiratsuka	1,423
23	2016.09.24	Blaublitz Akita	2-1	Fukushima United FC	Akigin Stadium	2,318
24	2016.10.02	Fukushima United FC	1-2	Gainare Tottori	Toho Stadium	2,079
25	2016.10.16	Tochigi SC	3-1	Fukushima United FC	Tochigi Green Stadium	5,358
26	2016.10.23	Fukushima United FC	2-0	YSCC Yokohama	Toho Stadium	2,303
27	2016.10.29	Cerezo Osaka U-23	2-2	Fukushima United FC	Kincho Stadium	713
28	2016.11.05	Grulla Morioka	4-2	Fukushima United FC	Iwagin Stadium	1,396
29	2016.11.13	Fukushima United FC	0-2	FC Tokyo U-23	Toho Stadium	3,052
30	2016.11.20	Fujieda MYFC	2-0	Fukushima United FC	Fujieda Soccer Stadium	2,257
