= 2016 Emperor's Cup =

Tournament details
- Country: Japan
- Dates: 27 August 2016 – 1 January 2017
- Teams: 88

Final positions
- Champions: Kashima Antlers (5th title)
- Runners-up: Kawasaki Frontale

Tournament statistics
- Matches played: 87
- Goals scored: 305 (3.51 per match)

The 96th Emperor's Cup (第96回天皇杯全日本サッカー選手権大会) was the 2016 edition of the annual Japanese national cup tournament, which was held from 27 August 2016 to its final on 1 January 2017.

Kashima Antlers won their fifth title after a 2–1 defeat of Kawasaki Frontale in the final after extra time.

Kashima Antlers would have qualified for the group stage of the 2017 AFC Champions League as the winner, but as they had already earned a spot by winning the 2016 J1 League, Kawasaki Frontale achieved it by way of finishing third in the 2016 J1 League.

== Calendar ==
Round	Date	Matches	Clubs	New entries this round
First Round	27, 28 August	36	47+1+2+22 → 36	47 prefectural cup winners; 1 2015 University championship winner; 22 J2 clubs; 2 second-placed team and playoff winners from the 2015 J2
Second Round	3, 7 September	24	36+12 → 24	12 2015 J1 clubs ranked 5th through 15th, 2015 J2 champions
Third Round	22 September	12	24 → 12	
Fourth Round	9, 12 November	8	12+4 → 8	4 Teams qualified for the 2016 AFC Champions League
Quarter-finals	24 December	4	8 → 4	
Semi-finals	29 December	2	4 → 2	
Final	1 January 2017	1	2 → 1	

== Participating clubs ==
88 clubs competed in the tournament. Eleven clubs placed 5th through 15th from the 2015 J1 League and the 2015 J2 League champions received a bye to the second round of the tournament; 2016 AFC Champions League participants entered in the fourth round. The remaining teams entered in the first round.

2016 J1 League all clubs	2016 J2 League all clubs	2015 University Championship champion	47 prefectural tournament winners	
Albirex Niigata; Avispa Fukuoka; Gamba Osaka; Júbilo Iwata; Kashima Antlers; Kashiwa Reysol; Kawasaki Frontale; Nagoya Grampus; Omiya Ardija; Sagan Tosu; Sanfrecce Hiroshima; Shonan Bellmare; FC Tokyo; Urawa Red Diamonds; Vegalta Sendai; Ventforet Kofu; Vissel Kobe; Yokohama F. Marinos	Cerezo Osaka; Consadole Sapporo; Ehime FC; Fagiano Okayama; FC Gifu; Giravanz Kitakyushu; JEF United Ichihara Chiba; Kamatamare Sanuki; Kyoto Sanga; FC Machida Zelvia; Matsumoto Yamaga FC; Mito HollyHock; Montedio Yamagata; Renofa Yamaguchi FC; Roasso Kumamoto; Shimizu S-Pulse; Thespakusatsu Gunma; Tokushima Vortis; Tokyo Verdy; V-Varen Nagasaki; Yokohama FC; Zweigen Kanazawa	Kwansei Gakuin University	Hokkaido: Hokkaido University; Aomori: Vanraure Hachinohe; Iwate: Grulla Morioka; Miyagi: Sony Sendai FC; Akita: Blaublitz Akita; Yamagata: Yamagata University; Fukushima: Fukushima United FC; Ibaraki: University of Tsukuba; Tochigi: Tochigi Uva FC; Gunma: Thespakusatsu Challengers; Saitama: Tokyo International University; Chiba: Vonds Ichihara; Tokyo: Waseda University; Kanagawa: Kanagawa University; Yamanashi: Yamanashi Gakuin University Orions; Nagano: AC Nagano Parceiro; Niigata: Niigata University of Health and Welfare; Toyama: Kataller Toyama; Ishikawa: Hokuriku University; Fukui: Saurcos Fukui; Shizuoka: Honda FC; Aichi: Tokai Gakuen University; Mie: Suzuka Unlimited FC; Gifu: FC Gifu Second	Shiga: MIO Biwako Shiga; Kyoto: Kyoto Sangyo University; Osaka: Kansai University; Hyōgo: Banditonce Kakogawa; Nara: Nara Club; Wakayama: Arterivo Wakayama; Tottori: Gainare Tottori; Shimane: Matsue City FC; Okayama: Fagiano Okayama Next; Hiroshima: SRC Hiroshima; Yamaguchi: Tokuyama University; Kagawa: R.Velho Takamatsu; Tokushima: FC Tokushima Celeste; Ehime: FC Imabari; Kōchi: Kochi United SC; Fukuoka: Fukuoka University; Saga: FC Tosu; Nagasaki: MD Nagasaki; Kumamoto: Tokai University Kumamoto; Ōita: Oita Trinita; Miyazaki: Honda Lock SC; Kagoshima: Kagoshima United FC; Okinawa: FC Ryukyu

== Schedule and results ==
The matches for the first three rounds were published on 27 June 2016.

=== First round ===
All times given in UTC+09:00

27 August 2016	Gainare Tottori	5–0	Fagiano Okayama Next	Tottori
18:00	Miyaichi 5', 24'; Fernandinho 52'; Hayashi 85'; Maeda 89'	Report		Stadium: Tottori Bank Bird Stadium; Attendance: 1,103; Referee: Osamu Akasaka

28 August 2016	Júbilo Iwata	7–0	FC Gifu Second	Iwata
18:00	Takagi 26'; Nakamura 32', 34', 84'; Saito 36', 37', 63'	Report		Stadium: Yamaha Stadium; Attendance: 2,650; Referee: Tomohiro Inoue

27 August 2016	FC Machida Zelvia	0–1	Kanagawa University	Machida
18:00		Report	Minami 61'	Stadium: Machida Athletic Stadium; Attendance: 1,182; Referee: Hayato Shimizu

27 August 2016	Tochigi Uva FC	1–1 (a.e.t.) (3–4 p)	Yamanashi Gakuin University Orions	Utsunomiya
17:00	Abe 92'	Report	Nagano 105+2'	Stadium: Tochigi Green Stadium; Attendance: 161; Referee: Leo Tanaka
	Penalties
	Uchiyama (penalty scored); Azechi (penalty missed); Koyama (penalty scored); Abe (penalty missed); Matsuda (penalty scored)		(penalty scored) Yamanushi; (penalty missed) Sasaki; (penalty scored) Yamashita; (penalty scored) Osaka; (penalty scored) Ichinose

27 August 2016	Tokushima Vortis	6–0	FC Tokushima Celeste	Naruto
18:00	I.Sasaki 16'; Hirose 43'; Y.Sasaki 66', 73', 74', 80'	Report		Stadium: Pocarisweat Stadium; Attendance: 1,420; Referee: Eiji Kawai

27 August 2016	Giravanz Kitakyushu	1–0	Fukuoka University	Kitakyushu
17:00	Inoue 27'	Report		Stadium: Honjō Athletic Stadium; Attendance: 1,225; Referee: Takumi Shinoto

27 August 2016	AC Nagano Parceiro	5–0	Hokuriku University	Nagano
17:00	Katsumata 25', 53'; Conrado 46'; Shiozawa 65'; Nishiguchi 68'	Report		Stadium: Minami Nagano Sports Park Stadium; Attendance: 1,853; Referee: Kakuro Hori

27 August 2016	V-Varen Nagasaki	2–1	Kochi United SC	Nagasaki
18:30	Kimura 30', 56'	Report	Sugawara 23' (pen.)	Stadium: Transcosmos Stadium; Attendance: 1,396; Referee: Tetsuro Yoshida

28 August 2016	Yokohama FC	5–0	Yamagata University	Yokohama
18:00	Osaki 16'; 35' (o.g.); Matsushita 88'; Na Sung-Soo 90'; Kusumoto 90+2'	Report		Stadium: Nippatsu Mitsuzawa Stadium; Attendance: 815; Referee: Kenta Tsukada

27 August 2016	Oita Trinita	3–0	MD Nagasaki	Ōita
18:00	Yoshihira 62', 85'; Kim Dong-wook 89'	Report		Stadium: Ōita Bank Dome; Attendance: 2,848; Referee: Keigo Sendachi

27 August 2016	Shimizu S-Pulse	2–1	Kansai University	Shizuoka
19:00	Kaneko 27'; Hasegawa 79'	Report	Takeshita 56'	Stadium: IAI Stadium Nihondaira; Attendance: 3,569; Referee: Shoichiro Mikami

27 August 2016	Mito HollyHock	1–0	Tokyo International University	Mito
18:00	Yamamura 86'	Report		Stadium: K's denki Stadium Mito; Attendance: 1,859; Referee: Kenshi Uda

27 August 2016	Kataller Toyama	1–0	Niigata University of Health and Welfare	Toyama
17:00	Eto 50'	Report		Stadium: Toyama Athletic Stadium; Attendance: 1,038; Referee: Taiki Tsuruoka

27 August 2016	Hokkaido Consadole Sapporo	3–0	University of Tsukuba	Sapporo
13:00	Kanda 37'; Uehara 56'; Nakahara 77'	Report		Stadium: Sapporo Atsubetsu Park Stadium; Attendance: 2,436; Referee: Hiromichi Oka

27 August 2016	Matsue City FC	1–4	Fagiano Okayama	Matsue
15:00	Yasukata 35'	Report	Akiyoshi 32', 40'; Fujimoto 75'; Toyokawa 80'	Stadium: Matsue Athletic Stadium; Attendance: 1,925; Referee: Takuya Maeda

27 August 2016	Tokai Gakuen University	1–2 (a.e.t.)	Suzuka Unlimited FC	Nagoya
16:00	Takuma Takeda 7'	Report	Junya Kitano 70'; 95' (o.g.)	Stadium: Nagoya City Minato Soccer Stadium; Attendance: 379; Referee: Yasuhiko Takenaga

27 August 2016	Montedio Yamagata	2–1 (a.e.t.)	Arterivo Wakayama	Tendō
18:00	Diego 22'; Hayashi 118'	Report	Shirakata 55'	Stadium: ND Soft Stadium Yamagata; Attendance: 2,095; Referee: Ryosuke Yamaoka

27 August 2016	Thespakusatsu Gunma	1–0	Sony Sendai FC	Maebashi
15:00	Komuta 64'	Report		Stadium: Shoda Shoyu Stadium Gunma; Attendance: 880; Referee: Takeshi Asada

27 August 2016	MIO Biwako Shiga	1–3	Kwansei Gakuin University	Higashiōmi
13:00	Osugi 61'	Report	Aoki 31', 58'; Uosato 62'	Stadium: Nunobiki Green Stadium; Attendance: 336; Referee: Yasuhiro Uchida

28 August 2016	Avispa Fukuoka	7–2	Kagoshima United FC	Fukuoka
16:00	Nakahara 12'; Tamura 28'; 60' (o.g.); Kunimoto 75'; Kanamori 80'; Mishima 87'; Sueyoshi 90'	Report	Fujimoto 9', 45+1'	Stadium: Level5 Stadium; Attendance: 1,731; Referee: Yoshiro Imamura

27 August 2016	Renofa Yamaguchi FC	4–0	Tokai University Kumamoto	Yamaguchi
18:00	Miyuki 8'; Kohno 29'; Ando 84'; Torikai 84'	Report		Stadium: Yamaguchi Ishin Park Stadium; Attendance: 2,704; Referee: Yosuke Kubota

27 August 2016	Fukushima United FC	4–1	Thespakusatsu Challengers	Fukushima
15:00	Okada 39'; Kamoshida 48'; Higuchi 75'; Maeda 90'	Report	Misao 5'	Stadium: Toho Stadium for Everyone; Attendance: 480; Referee: Keisuke Nobori

28 August 2016	Roasso Kumamoto	2–1	FC Tosu	Kumamoto
19:00	Hirashige 45'; Kim Tae-yeon 90+1'	Report	Maruyama 52'	Stadium: Umakana Yokana Stadium; Attendance: 1,835; Referee: Shu Kawamata

27 August 2016	Tokyo Verdy	2–1	Vonds Ichihara	Kita, Tokyo
18:00	Douglas Vieira 26'; Takagi 53'	Report	Nihei 57'	Stadium: Ajinomoto Field Nishigaoka; Attendance: 1,132; Referee: Taku Nagaya

27 August 2016	Nara Club	2–0	Kyoto Sangyo University	Nara
13:00	Sato 28'; Shige 30'	Report		Stadium: Konoike Athletic Stadium; Attendance: 538; Referee: Kei Suzuki

28 August 2016	Kamatamare Sanuki	1–0	FC Imabari	Marugame
16:00	Watanabe 65'	Report		Stadium: Pikara Stadium; Attendance: 1,572; Referee: Tomokazu Sato

27 August 2016	SRC Hiroshima	0–4	Ehime FC	Hiroshima
16:00		Report	Suzuki 34', 65', 90+2'; Sakano 36'	Stadium: Hiroshima Regional Park First Ball Field; Attendance: 509; Referee: Toru Kakinuma

28 August 2016	Grulla Morioka	4–0	Waseda University	Morioka
13:00	Ushinohama 7'; Anraku 29', 56'; Taniguchi 64'	Report		Stadium: Iwate Athletic Stadium; Attendance: 604; Referee: Yoshikazu Matsuzawa

28 August 2016	Matsumoto Yamaga FC	6–0	Tokuyama University	Matsumoto
18:00	Mishima 7', 28'; Maeda 29'; Willians 42'; Ishihara 87'; Yamamoto 90+1'	Report		Stadium: Matsumotodaira Football Stadium; Attendance: 4,561; Referee: Kazuya Fujita

27 August 2016	FC Gifu	1–2 (a.e.t.)	Honda FC	Gifu
13:00	Kazama 16'	Report	Omachi 12'; Miyauchi 120+1'	Stadium: Gifu Memorial Center Nagaragawa Ball Field; Attendance: 1,059; Referee: Shuhei Shimizu

27 August 2016	Blaublitz Akita	2–0	Vanraure Hachinohe	Akita
13:00	Urashima 12'; Go Daimu 59'	Report		Stadium: Akigin Stadium; Attendance: 603; Referee: Kazuyoshi Karashima

27 August 2016	JEF United Chiba	5–0	Hokkaido University	Chiba
18:00	Élton 25', 55', 63', 76'; Niwa 60'	Report		Stadium: Fukuda Denshi Arena; Attendance: 2,475; Referee: Hirokazu Otsubo

28 August 2016	Zweigen Kanazawa	4–1	Saurcos Fukui	Kanazawa
16:00	Kumagai 11', 74'; Tomita 45+2'; Kaneko 49'	Report	Matsuo 53'	Stadium: Ishikawa Athletics Stadium; Attendance: 1,248; Referee: Takao Nishiyama

27 August 2016	FC Ryukyu	1–0	Honda Lock SC	Okinawa
19:30	Tanaka 90'	Report		Stadium: Okinawa Athletic Stadium; Attendance: 617; Referee: Kenya Ohara

27 August 2016	Cerezo Osaka	10–0	R.Velho Takamatsu	Osaka
19:00	Sakemoto 17'; Sawakami 39'; Sugimoto 45', 51', 64', 74', 76'; Maruhashi 57'; Souza 68'; Tamada 90+2'	Report		Stadium: Kincho Stadium; Attendance: 3,037; Referee: Koichiro Fukushima

28 August 2016	Kyoto Sanga	4–0	Banditonce Kakogawa	Kyoto
18:00	Escudero 24'; Kokuryo 31'; Arita 53'; Yajima 67'	Report		Stadium: Nishikyogoku Athletic Stadium; Attendance: 1,488; Referee: Toshimitsu Yoshida

=== Second round ===
7 September 2016	Omiya Ardija	1–0	Gainare Tottori	Saitama
19:00	Pečnik 51'	Report		Stadium: NACK5 Stadium Omiya; Attendance: 2,456; Referee: Kazuyoshi Enomoto

3 September 2016	Júbilo Iwata	2–0	Kanagawa University	Iwata
18:00	Morishima 40'; Nakamura 90+3'	Report		Stadium: Yamaha Stadium; Attendance: 3,467; Referee: Shoichiro Mikami

3 September 2016	Shonan Bellmare	6–0	Yamanashi Gakuin University Orions	Hiratsuka
19:00	Shimoda 1', 8', 72'; Dinei 12'; Weslley 82', 86'	Report		Stadium: Shonan BMW Stadium Hiratsuka; Attendance: 1,395; Referee: Yuki Noda

3 September 2016	Tokushima Vortis	2–0	Giravanz Kitakyushu	Naruto
18:00	Osaki 76'; Kim Kyung-jung 87'	Report		Stadium: Pocarisweat Stadium; Attendance: 1,282; Referee: Takuya Maeda

3 September 2016	Nagoya Grampus	0–1	AC Nagano Parceiro	Nagoya
18:00		Report	Tada 90+4'	Stadium: Nagoya City Minato Soccer Stadium; Attendance: 3,785; Referee: Koichiro Fukushima

3 September 2016	V-Varen Nagasaki	1–2 (a.e.t.)	Yokohama FC	Nagasaki
18:30	Kimura 89' (pen.)	Report	Ibba 15' (pen.); Nomura 112'	Stadium: Transcosmos Stadium Nagasaki; Attendance: 1,483; Referee: Ryosuke Yamaoka

3 September 2016	Ventforet Kofu	0–0 (a.e.t.) (6–7 p)	Oita Trinita	Kofu
15:00		Report		Stadium: Yamanashi Chuo Bank Stadium; Attendance: 2,490; Referee: Masuya Ueda
	Penalties
	Tanaka (penalty scored); Kurogi (penalty scored); Tsuda (penalty scored); Dudu (penalty missed); Hatao (penalty scored); Marquinhos Paraná (penalty scored); Mori (penalty scored); Matsuhashi (penalty missed)		(penalty missed) Goto; (penalty scored) Kim Dong-wook; (penalty scored) Yoshihira; (penalty scored) R.Matsumoto; (penalty scored) M.Matsumoto; (penalty scored) Suzuki; (penalty scored) Hwang Song-su; (penalty scored) Daniel

3 September 2016	Shimizu S-Pulse	3–0	Mito HollyHock	Shizuoka
19:00	Kaneko 18'; Jong Tae-se 24'; Edamura 66'	Report		Stadium: IAI Stadium Nihondaira; Attendance: 3,703; Referee: Kazuyoshi Enomoto

3 September 2016	Kashima Antlers	3–0	Kataller Toyama	Kashima
18:30	Akasaki 35'; Shibasaki 39'; Suzuki 59'	Report		Stadium: Kashima Soccer Stadium; Attendance: 4,241; Referee: Toshimitsu Yoshida

3 September 2016	Hokkaido Consadole Sapporo	1–2	Fagiano Okayama	Sapporo
13:00	Tokura 90+5' (pen.)	Report	Toyokawa 4'; Fujimoto 86'	Stadium: Sapporo Atsubetsu Park Stadium; Attendance: 2,698; Referee: Tomohiro Inoue

7 September 2016	Vissel Kobe	7–1	Suzuka Unlimited FC	Kobe
19:00	Ishizu 6'; Watanabe 10'; Pedro Júnior 43', 66'; Nakasaka 64'; Fujita 68'; Masuyama 87'	Report	Kakimoto 76'	Stadium: Kobe Universiade Memorial Stadium; Attendance: 1,658; Referee: Syoichiro Mikami

3 September 2016	Montedio Yamagata	5–0	Thespakusatsu Gunma	Tendō
18:00	Kawanishi 9'; Diego 29'; Suzuki 32'; Matsuoka 82'; Hayashi 89'	Report		Stadium: ND Soft Stadium Yamagata; Attendance: 2,310; Referee: Eiji Kawai

3 September 2016	Albirex Niigata	5–3 (a.e.t.)	Kwansei Gakuin University	Niigata
16:00	Rafael Silva 27', 56', 58', 107'; Naruoka 112'	Report	Aoki 22'; Yamamoto 31'; Mori 79'	Stadium: Denka Big Swan Stadium; Attendance: 3,475; Referee: Hiromichi Oka

7 September 2016	Avispa Fukuoka	2–2 (a.e.t.) (2–4 p)	Renofa Yamaguchi FC	Fukuoka
19:00	Kunimoto 51', 103'	Report	Torikai 49'; Hoshi 120'	Stadium: Level5 Stadium; Attendance: 1,690; Referee: Koichiro Fukushima
	Penalties
	Sueyoshi (penalty scored); Saneto (penalty missed); Jogo (penalty missed); Mikado (penalty scored)		(penalty scored) Nakayama; (penalty scored) Miyuki; (penalty scored) Fukumitsu; (penalty scored) Shoji

7 September 2016	Yokohama F. Marinos	2–0 (a.e.t.)	Fukushima United FC	Yokohama
19:00	Nakamachi 107'; Kayke 115'	Report		Stadium: Nippatsu Mitsuzawa Stadium; Attendance: 3,425; Referee: Kazuya Fujita

3 September 2016	Roasso Kumamoto	1–5	Tokyo Verdy	Kumamoto
19:00	Hirashige 8'	Report	Taira 28', 66'; Y.Takagi 43'; Sawai 50'; D.Takagi 90+4'	Stadium: Umakana Yokana Stadium; Attendance: 1,483; Referee: Tetsuro Yoshida

3 September 2016	Kashiwa Reysol	5–2	Nara Club	Kashiwa
18:00	Ōtsu 58', 73'; Dudu 63'; Cristiano 69', 90+3'	Report	Ogasa 55'; Taniguchi 61'	Stadium: Hitachi Kashiwa Soccer Stadium; Attendance: 3,356; Referee: Takuto Okabe

3 September 2016	Kamatamare Sanuki	0–2	Ehime FC	Marugame
15:00		Report	Omotehara 62'; Kondo 89'	Stadium: Pikara Stadium; Attendance: 1,415; Referee: Hayato Shimizu

3 September 2016	Vegalta Sendai	2–5	Grulla Morioka	Sendai
19:00	Ishikawa 18'; Motegi 80'	Report	Ushinohama 13'; Umenai 26', 64'; Anraku 32'; Suzuki 74'	Stadium: Yurtec Stadium Sendai; Attendance: 3,870; Referee: Itaru Hirose

3 September 2016	Matsumoto Yamaga FC	1–2	Honda FC	Matsumoto
16:00	Takasaki 26'	Report	Omachi 29'; Harada 67'	Stadium: Matsumotodaira Football Stadium; Attendance: 5,505; Referee: Kenta Tsukada

3 September 2016	Kawasaki Frontale	3–1	Blaublitz Akita	Kawasaki
19:00	Eduardo 67'; Ōkubo 77'; Tasaka 82'	Report	Maeyama 28'	Stadium: Todoroki Athletics Stadium; Attendance: 5,088; Referee: Toru Kakinuma

3 September 2016	JEF United Chiba	2–0	Zweigen Kanazawa	Chiba
18:00	Élton 57'; Nagasawa 86'	Report		Stadium: Fukuda Denshi Arena; Attendance: 3,021; Referee: Kazuya Fujita

3 September 2016	Sagan Tosu	3–1	FC Ryukyu	Tosu
19:00	Moestafa El Kabir 9'; Kamada 18'; Okada 62'	Report	Tanabe 66'	Stadium: Tosu Stadium; Attendance: 3,489; Referee: Atsushi Kamimura

3 September 2016	Cerezo Osaka	2–1 (a.e.t.)	Kyoto Sanga	Osaka
19:00	Sugimoto 25' (pen.); Souza 107'	Report	Yamase 14'	Stadium: Kincho Stadium; Attendance: 5,518; Referee: Yoshiro Imamura

=== Third round ===
22 September 2016	Omiya Ardija	5–0	Júbilo Iwata	Saitama
16:00	Izumisawa 26', 40'; Pečnik 57'; Mateus 58'; Oyama 68'	Report		Stadium: NACK5 Stadium Omiya; Attendance: 3,625

22 September 2016	Shonan Bellmare	4–0	Tokushima Vortis	Hiratsuka
19:00	Fujita 6'; Yamada 25', 61'; Saito 50'	Report		Stadium: Shonan BMW Stadium Hiratsuka; Attendance: 1,527

22 September 2016	AC Nagano Parceiro	2–3 (a.e.t.)	Yokohama FC	Nagoya
19:00	Shiozawa 26'; Conrado 51'	Report	Ōkubo 50'; Ibba 67'; Nguyễn Tuấn Anh 101'	Stadium: Paloma Mizuho Stadium; Attendance: 733

22 September 2016	Oita Trinita	0–1	Shimizu S-Pulse	Kōfu
15:00		Report	Inukai 54'	Stadium: Yamanashi Chuo Bank Stadium; Attendance: 1,471

22 September 2016	Kashima Antlers	2–1	Fagiano Okayama	Kashima
15:00	Nagaki 60'; Tanaka 88' (o.g.)	Report	Fujimoto 22'	Stadium: Kashima Soccer Stadium; Attendance: 5,291

22 September 2016	Vissel Kobe	3–3 (a.e.t.) (5–3 p)	Montedio Yamagata	Kobe
15:00	Pedro Júnior 9', 28'; Takahashi 90+3'	Report	Diego 65'; Matsuoka 74'; Oguro 80'	Stadium: Kobe Universiade Memorial Stadium; Attendance: 2,425

22 September 2016	Albirex Niigata	1–0	Renofa Yamaguchi FC	Niigata
14:00	Yamazaki 77'	Report		Stadium: Denka Big Swan Stadium; Attendance: 4,084

22 September 2016	Yokohama F. Marinos	4–0	Tokyo Verdy	Kōchi
16:00	Nakamura 18'; Nakamachi 26'; Kayke 45+1', 88'	Report		Stadium: Kochi Haruno Athletic Stadium; Attendance: 5,733

22 September 2016	Kashiwa Reysol	1–0 (a.e.t.)	Ehime FC	Kashiwa
19:00	Cristiano 113'	Report		Stadium: Hitachi Kashiwa Soccer Stadium; Attendance: 3,345

22 September 2016	Grulla Morioka	1–2	Honda FC	Sendai
13:00	Umenai 59'	Report	Omachi 26'; Nakagawa 90+4'	Stadium: Yurtec Stadium Sendai; Attendance: 1,075

22 September 2016	Kawasaki Frontale	4–1 (a.e.t.)	JEF United Chiba	Kawasaki
18:00	Morimoto 20'; Kurumaya 105'; Ōkubo 108', 115'	Report	Funayama 51'	Stadium: Todoroki Athletics Stadium; Attendance: 8,078

22 September 2016	Sagan Tosu	2–0	Cerezo Osaka	Tosu
19:00	Toyoda 34'; Tomiyama 75'	Report		Stadium: Tosu Stadium; Attendance: 5,391

=== Fourth round ===
12 November 2016	Yokohama F. Marinos	1–0	Albirex Niigata	Yokohama
15:00	Amano 90+4'	Report		Stadium: Nissan Stadium; Attendance: 11,356

9 November 2016	Gamba Osaka	1–0 (a.e.t.)	Shimizu S-Pulse	Osaka
19:00	Nagasawa 112'	Report		Stadium: Suita City Football Stadium; Attendance: 8,789

12 November 2016	Kashima Antlers	2–1	Vissel Kobe	Kobe
14:00	Fabrício 31', 55'	Report	Watanabe 64'	Stadium: Noevir Stadium Kobe; Attendance: 7,282

12 November 2016	Sagan Tosu	0–3	Sanfrecce Hiroshima	Tosu
15:00		Report	Shibasaki 18'; Utaka 26'; Anderson Lopes 53'	Stadium: Tosu Stadium; Attendance: 9,743

9 November 2016	Omiya Ardija	1–0	Yokohama FC	Ōmiya
19:00	Ienaga 89' (pen.)	Report		Stadium: NACK5 Stadium Omiya; Attendance: 4,714

12 November 2016	Kashiwa Reysol	1–3	Shonan Bellmare	Kashiwa
13:00	Wako 25'	Report	Dinei 52'; Takayama 68'; Otsuki 85'	Stadium: Hitachi Kashiwa Soccer Stadium; Attendance: 6,588

9 November 2016	FC Tokyo	2–1	Honda FC	Tokyo
19:00	Nakajima 51'; Muroya 80'	Report	Kuno 18'	Stadium: Ajinomoto Stadium; Attendance: 6,605

12 November 2016	Kawasaki Frontale	3–3 (a.e.t.) (4–1 p)	Urawa Red Diamonds	Kawasaki
19:00	Ōkubo 86' (pen.); Morimoto 90+1'; Eduardo 117'	Report	Koroki 71'; Noborizato 88' (o.g.); Aoki 97'	Stadium: Todoroki Athletics Stadium; Attendance: 20,009
	Penalties
	Ōkubo (penalty scored); Miyoshi (penalty scored); Eduardo (penalty scored); Eduardo Neto (penalty scored)		(penalty scored) Abe; (penalty missed) Ljubijankić; (penalty missed) Koroki

=== Quarterfinals ===
24 December 2016	Yokohama F. Marinos	2–1	Gamba Osaka	Yokohama
13:00	Saitō 64' (pen.); Amano 90+6'	Report	Konno 87'	Stadium: Nissan Stadium; Attendance: 21,898; Referee: Masaaki Toma

24 December 2016	Kashima Antlers	1–0	Sanfrecce Hiroshima	Kashima
13:00	Akasaki 57'	Report		Stadium: Kashima Soccer Stadium; Attendance: 18,391; Referee: Nobutsugu Murakami

24 December 2016	Omiya Ardija	4–2 (a.e.t.)	Shonan Bellmare	Ōmiya
16:00	Izumisawa 32'; K. Kikuchi 111', 118'; Oya 120'	Report	S. Kikuchi 70'; Fujita 93'	Stadium: NACK5 Stadium Omiya; Attendance: 10,297; Referee: Yudai Yamamoto

24 December 2016	FC Tokyo	1–2	Kawasaki Frontale	Tokyo
16:00	Hirayama 90+1'	Report	Ōkubo 20'; Elsinho 28'	Stadium: Ajinomoto Stadium; Attendance: 29,378; Referee: Ryuji Sato

=== Semifinals ===
29 December 2016	Yokohama F. Marinos	0–2	Kashima Antlers	Osaka
13:05		Report	Doi 41'; Suzuki 73'	Stadium: Yanmar Stadium Nagai; Attendance: 14,302; Referee: Jumpei Iida

29 December 2016	Omiya Ardija	0–1	Kawasaki Frontale	Yokohama
15:05		Report	Taniguchi 85'	Stadium: Nissan Stadium; Attendance: 23,807; Referee: Hiroyuki Kimura

=== Final ===
1 January 2017	Kashima Antlers	2–1 (a.e.t.)	Kawasaki Frontale	Osaka
14:00	Yamamoto 42'; Fabrício 94'	Report	Kobayashi 54'	Stadium: Suita City Football Stadium; Attendance: 34,166; Referee: Hajime Matsuo
