= 2018 Fukushima United FC season =

Fukushima United FC
2018 season
- Manager: Kazuaki Tasaka
- Stadium: Toho Stadium
- J3 League: 12th
Home colours	Away colours

2018 Fukushima United FC season.

== Squad ==
As of 28 May 2018. Note: Flags indicate national team as defined under FIFA eligibility rules; some limited exceptions apply. Players may hold more than one non-FIFA nationality.

No.	Pos.	Nation	Player
2	DF	JPN	Ryota Okada
3	DF	JPN	Akihiro Sakata
4	DF	JPN	Hirokazu Usami
6	MF	JPN	Takashi Kamoshida
7	DF	JPN	Hiroto Mogi
8	MF	JPN	Kazuto Ishido (captain)
9	FW	JPN	Hayate Take
10	MF	JPN	Takuto Hashimoto
11	FW	JPN	Shota Tamura
13	FW	JPN	Shuhei Mitsuhashi
14	MF	JPN	Kota Hoshi
15	MF	JPN	Shuto Hira
16	GK	JPN	Daiki Hotta

No.	Pos.	Nation	Player
17	MF	JPN	Naoki Maeda
18	MF	JPN	Yuki Hashimoto
19	FW	JPN	Hibiki Wada
22	MF	BRA	Nildo
23	GK	JPN	Go Ito
25	DF	JPN	Junya Higashi
27	FW	JPN	Masaki Ikeda
28	GK	JPN	Ryo Ishii
29	MF	JPN	Yuji Wakasa
34	DF	JPN	Kota Teramae
40	FW	JPN	Hiroki Higuchi
41	MF	JPN	Shohei Kawakami

== J3 League ==
Match	Date	Team	Score	Team	Venue	Attendance
1	2018.03.11	Fukushima United FC	2-1	Thespakusatsu Gunma	Toho Stadium	2,837
2	2018.03.17	Gainare Tottori	2-1	Fukushima United FC	Tottori Bank Bird Stadium	4,817
3	2018.03.21	Fukushima United FC	0-0	Kagoshima United FC	Toho Stadium	671
4	2018.03.25	Blaublitz Akita	0-1	Fukushima United FC	Akita Yabase Athletic Field	11,802
5	2018.04.01	Fukushima United FC	2-1	FC Ryukyu	Toho Stadium	1,249
6	2018.04.07	YSCC Yokohama	3-0	Fukushima United FC	NHK Spring Mitsuzawa Football Stadium	830
7	2018.04.15	Cerezo Osaka U-23	1-1	Fukushima United FC	Kincho Stadium	769
8	2018.04.29	Fukushima United FC	2-0	Fujieda MYFC	Toho Stadium	1,253
9	2018.05.03	Fukushima United FC	1-0	Kataller Toyama	Toho Stadium	1,351
11	2018.05.20	Azul Claro Numazu	0-0	Fukushima United FC	Ashitaka Park Stadium	2,829
12	2018.06.03	Fukushima United FC	0-0	Grulla Morioka	Toho Stadium	1,891
13	2018.06.10	Gamba Osaka U-23	1-1	Fukushima United FC	Expo '70 Commemorative Stadium	974
14	2018.06.17	Fukushima United FC	2-2	SC Sagamihara	Toho Stadium	1,223
15	2018.06.24	Fukushima United FC	2-2	Giravanz Kitakyushu	Toho Stadium	1,713
16	2018.07.01	AC Nagano Parceiro	1-1	Fukushima United FC	Nagano U Stadium	3,576
17	2018.07.07	FC Tokyo U-23	2-3	Fukushima United FC	Yumenoshima Stadium	1,131
18	2018.07.16	Fukushima United FC	1-1	Azul Claro Numazu	Aizu Athletic Park Stadium	1,395
19	2018.07.21	SC Sagamihara	1-1	Fukushima United FC	Sagamihara Gion Stadium	2,229
20	2018.08.25	Kataller Toyama	3-1	Fukushima United FC	Toyama Stadium	3,756
21	2018.09.02	Fukushima United FC	1-0	Cerezo Osaka U-23	Toho Stadium	1,174
22	2018.09.08	Kagoshima United FC	2-1	Fukushima United FC	Shiranami Stadium	2,124
23	2018.09.16	Fukushima United FC	1-1	AC Nagano Parceiro	Toho Stadium	3,199
24	2018.09.23	Fukushima United FC	0-1	YSCC Yokohama	Shonan BMW Stadium Hiratsuka	1,203
25	2018.09.30	Grulla Morioka	2-2	Fukushima United FC	Iwagin Stadium	787
26	2018.10.07	Fukushima United FC	0-2	FC Tokyo U-23	Toho Stadium	1,176
27	2018.10.13	FC Ryukyu	3-0	Fukushima United FC	Tapic Kenso Hiyagon Stadium	2,649
28	2018.10.21	Thespakusatsu Gunma	1-0	Fukushima United FC	Shoda Shoyu Stadium Gunma	4,678
29	2018.10.28	Fukushima United FC	3-4	Gainare Tottori	Toho Stadium	1,408
30	2018.11.03	Fujieda MYFC	1-2	Fukushima United FC	Fujieda Soccer Stadium	1,090
32	2018.11.18	Fukushima United FC	4-3	Gamba Osaka U-23	Toho Stadium	1,055
33	2018.11.25	Fukushima United FC	0-2	Blaublitz Akita	Toho Stadium	2,416
34	2018.12.02	Giravanz Kitakyushu	0-0	Fukushima United FC	Mikuni World Stadium Kitakyushu	4,548
