= 2016 Kashima Antlers season =

Kashima Antlers
2016 season
- Manager: Masatada Ishii
- Stadium: Kashima Soccer Stadium
- J1 League: Champions
- Emperor's Cup: Winners
- League Cup: Group stage
- Suruga Bank Championship: Runners-up
- Top goalscorer: League: Mu Kanazaki (13); All: Mu Kanazaki (15)
Home colours	Away colours

The 2016 season was Kashima's 24th consecutive season in the J1 League, the top-division of professional football in Japan. In addition to the league campaign, the club also competed in the Emperor's Cup, League Cup, Super Cup, and Suruga Bank Championship.

== Squad ==
As of 21 February 2016.

Note: Flags indicate national team as defined under FIFA eligibility rules; some limited exceptions apply. Players may hold more than one non-FIFA nationality.

No.	Pos.	Nation	Player
1	GK	JPN	Masatoshi Kushibiki
3	DF	JPN	Gen Shoji
6	MF	JPN	Ryota Nagaki
8	MF	JPN	Shoma Doi
10	MF	JPN	Gaku Shibasaki
11	MF	BRA	Fabrício
13	MF	JPN	Atsutaka Nakamura
14	DF	KOR	Hwang Seok-ho
15	FW	JPN	Hiroyuki Takasaki
16	DF	JPN	Shuto Yamamoto
17	DF	BRA	Bueno
18	FW	JPN	Shuhei Akasaki
20	MF	JPN	Kento Misao
21	GK	JPN	Hitoshi Sogahata
22	DF	JPN	Daigo Nishi

No.	Pos.	Nation	Player
23	DF	JPN	Naomichi Ueda
24	DF	JPN	Yukitoshi Ito
25	MF	JPN	Yasushi Endo
26	MF	JPN	Kazune Kubota
28	DF	JPN	Koki Machida
29	GK	JPN	Shinichiro Kawamata
30	MF	JPN	Hisashi Ohashi
31	GK	JPN	Yuto Koizumi
32	MF	JPN	Taro Sugimoto
34	FW	JPN	Yuma Suzuki
35	MF	JPN	Taiki Hirato
36	MF	JPN	Toshiya Tanaka
37	MF	JPN	Yuki Kakita
40	MF	JPN	Mitsuo Ogasawara (captain)

== Competitions ==
=== J1 League ===
==== Table ====
Pos	Team	Pld	W	D	L	GF	GA	GD	Pts	Qualification
1	Kashima Antlers (Q)	17	12	3	2	29	10	+19	39	Champions League group stage and J.League Championship 1st Round
2	Kawasaki Frontale	17	11	5	1	33	15	+18	38	
3	Urawa Red Diamonds	17	10	3	4	26	16	+10	33	
4	Sanfrecce Hiroshima	17	8	5	4	32	18	+14	29	
5	Omiya Ardija	17	7	5	5	17	18	−1	26	

Source: 2016 MEIJI YASUDA J1 LEAGUE 1st Stage League table
Rules for classification: 1) Points; 2) Goal difference; 3) Goals scored.
(Q) Qualified for the phase indicated

Pos	Team	Pld	W	D	L	GF	GA	GD	Pts
9	FC Tokyo	17	9	2	6	23	21	+2	29
10	Sanfrecce Hiroshima	17	8	2	7	26	22	+4	26
11	Kashima Antlers	17	6	2	9	24	24	0	20
12	Vegalta Sendai	17	6	2	9	19	23	−4	20
13	Ventforet Kofu	17	4	4	9	14	27	−13	16

Source: 2016 MEIJI YASUDA J1 LEAGUE 2nd Stage League table
Rules for classification: 1) Points; 2) Goal difference; 3) Goals scored.

Pos	Team	Pld	W	D	L	GF	GA	GD	Pts	Qualification or relegation
1	Urawa Red Diamonds	34	23	5	6	61	28	+33	74	Champions League group stage and J. League Championship Final
2	Kawasaki Frontale	34	22	6	6	68	39	+29	72	Champions League group stage and J. League Championship 1st Round
3	Kashima Antlers (C)	34	18	5	11	53	34	+19	59	Club World Cup, Champions League group stage and J. League Championship 1st Round
4	Gamba Osaka	34	17	7	10	53	42	+11	58	Champions League play-off round (Note: The winner of the 2016 Emperor's Cup qualified for the Group Stage of the 2017 AFC Champions League. Since the Emperor's Cup winner Kashima Antlers had already qualified for the AFC Champions League, the play-off round spot was awarded to the fourth-placed team.)
5	Omiya Ardija	34	15	11	8	41	36	+5	56	

Source: Meiji Yasuda J1 League
Rules for classification: 1) Points; 2) Goal difference; 3) Goals scored.
(C) Champions

==== Matches ====
Match	Date	Team	Score	Team	Venue	Attendance
1-1	2016.02.28	Gamba Osaka	0–1	Kashima Antlers	Suita City Football Stadium	32,463
1-2	2016.03.05	Kashima Antlers	1–0	Sagan Tosu	Kashima Soccer Stadium	19,696
1-3	2016.03.12	Vegalta Sendai	1–0	Kashima Antlers	Yurtec Stadium Sendai	15,826
1-4	2016.03.19	Kashima Antlers	2–0	FC Tokyo	Kashima Soccer Stadium	15,996
1-5	2016.04.02	Kawasaki Frontale	1–1	Kashima Antlers	Kawasaki Todoroki Stadium	23,955
1-6	2016.04.10	Kashima Antlers	4–1	Sanfrecce Hiroshima	Kashima Soccer Stadium	19,764
1-7	2016.04.16	Shonan Bellmare	0–3	Kashima Antlers	Shonan BMW Stadium Hiratsuka	13,039
1-8	2016.04.24	Kashima Antlers	0–2	Kashiwa Reysol	Kashima Soccer Stadium	15,914
1-9	2016.04.30	Omiya Ardija	0–0	Kashima Antlers	NACK5 Stadium Omiya	12,594
1-10	2016.05.04	Kashima Antlers	2–1	Albirex Niigata	Kashima Soccer Stadium	24,805
1-11	2016.05.08	Júbilo Iwata	1–1	Kashima Antlers	Yamaha Stadium	14,155
1-12	2016.05.14	Kashima Antlers	1–0	Yokohama F. Marinos	Kashima Soccer Stadium	20,177
1-13	2016.05.21	Nagoya Grampus	2–3	Kashima Antlers	Toyota Stadium	17,499
1-14	2016.05.29	Kashima Antlers	4–0	Ventforet Kofu	Kashima Soccer Stadium	14,289
1-15	2016.06.11	Urawa Reds	0–2	Kashima Antlers	Saitama Stadium 2002	51,674
1-16	2016.06.18	Vissel Kobe	1–2	Kashima Antlers	Noevir Stadium Kobe	18,875
1-17	2016.06.25	Kashima Antlers	2–0	Avispa Fukuoka	Kashima Soccer Stadium	31,636
2-1	2016.07.02	Kashima Antlers	1–3	Gamba Osaka	Kashima Soccer Stadium	21,524
2-2	2016.07.09	Sanfrecce Hiroshima	2–4	Kashima Antlers	Edion Stadium Hiroshima	16,551
2-3	2016.07.13	Kashima Antlers	3–0	Nagoya Grampus	Kashima Soccer Stadium	6,696
2-4	2016.07.17	Ventforet Kofu	3–3	Kashima Antlers	Yamanashi Chuo Bank Stadium	14,095
2-5	2016.07.23	Kashima Antlers	1–2	Urawa Reds	Kashima Soccer Stadium	30,249
2-6	2016.07.30	Sagan Tosu	1–0	Kashima Antlers	Best Amenity Stadium	12,803
2-7	2016.08.06	Kashima Antlers	0–1	Vegalta Sendai	Kashima Soccer Stadium	13,982
2-8	2016.08.14	Avispa Fukuoka	1–2	Kashima Antlers	Level5 Stadium	16,530
2-9	2016.08.20	Kashima Antlers	1–0	Shonan Bellmare	Kashima Soccer Stadium	14,233
2-10	2016.08.27	Yokohama F. Marinos	2–2	Kashima Antlers	Nissan Stadium	29,123
2-11	2016.09.10	Kashiwa Reysol	2–0	Kashima Antlers	Hitachi Kashiwa Stadium	12,815
2-12	2016.09.17	Kashima Antlers	3–0	Júbilo Iwata	Kashima Soccer Stadium	15,787
2-13	2016.09.25	Albirex Niigata	0–2	Kashima Antlers	Denka Big Swan Stadium	26,202
2-14	2016.10.01	Kashima Antlers	1–3	Omiya Ardija	Kashima Soccer Stadium	20,086
2-15	2016.10.22	FC Tokyo	2–1	Kashima Antlers	Ajinomoto Stadium	37,317
2-16	2016.10.29	Kashima Antlers	0–1	Kawasaki Frontale	Kashima Soccer Stadium	24,000
2-17	2016.11.03	Kashima Antlers	0–1	Vissel Kobe	Kashima Soccer Stadium	15,925

==== Championship stage ====
The Championship stage consisted of a knockout tournament involving the champions of the First and Second stages, and any team that finishes in the top 3 of the overall table. The team with the best aggregate record earned a bye to the final. The remaining teams playoff for the other spot in the final.

Semifinal		Final
		Urawa Red Diamonds	1	1	2
Kawasaki Frontale	0	Kashima Antlers	0	2	2
Kashima Antlers	1

23 November 2016	Kawasaki Frontale	0–1	Kashima Antlers	Todoroki Athletics Stadium, Kawasaki
14:00		Report	Kanazaki 50'	Attendance: 24,209; Referee: Shinji Murakami

29 November 2016	Kashima Antlers	0–1	Urawa Red Diamonds	Kashima Soccer Stadium, Kashima
19:25		Report	Abe 57' (pen.)	Attendance: 23,074; Referee: Masaaki Toma

3 December 2016	Urawa Red Diamonds	1–2	Kashima Antlers	Saitama Stadium 2002, Midori-ku, Saitama
19:30	Koroki 7'	Report	Kanazaki 40', 79' (pen.)	Attendance: 59,837; Referee: Ryuji Sato

=== Emperor's Cup ===
==== Second round ====
3 September 2016	Kashima Antlers	3–0	Kataller Toyama	Kashima, Ibaraki
18:30	Akasaki 35'; Shibasaki 39'; Suzuki 59'	Report		Stadium: Kashima Soccer Stadium; Attendance: 4,241; Referee: Toshimitsu Yoshida

==== Third round ====
22 September 2016	Kashima Antlers	2–1	Fagiano Okayama	Kashima, Ibaraki
15:00	Nagaki 60'; Tanaka 88' (o.g.)	Report	Fujimoto 22'	Stadium: Kashima Soccer Stadium; Attendance: 5,291

==== Fourth round ====
12 November 2016	Kashima Antlers	2–1	Vissel Kobe	Kobe
14:00	Fabrício 31', 55'	Report	Watanabe 64'	Stadium: Noevir Stadium Kobe; Attendance: 7,282

==== Quarter-final ====
24 December 2016	Kashima Antlers	1–0	Sanfrecce Hiroshima	Kashima, Ibaraki
13:00	Akasaki 57'	Report		Stadium: Kashima Soccer Stadium; Attendance: 18,391; Referee: Nobutsugu Murakami

==== Semi-final ====
29 December 2016	Yokohama F. Marinos	0–2	Kashima Antlers	Osaka
13:05		Report	Doi 41'; Suzuki 73'	Stadium: Yanmar Stadium Nagai; Attendance: 14,302; Referee: Jumpei Iida

==== Final ====
1 January 2017	Kashima Antlers	2–1 (a.e.t.)	Kawasaki Frontale	Osaka
14:00	Yamamoto 42'; Fabrício 94'	Report	Kobayashi 54'	Stadium: Suita City Football Stadium; Attendance: 34,166; Referee: Hajime Matsuo

=== J.League Cup ===
==== Group stage ====
Pos	Team	Pld	W	D	L	GF	GA	GD	Pts	Qualification	VIS	ARD	VEN	BEL	JÚB	ANT	GRA
1	Vissel Kobe	6	5	1	0	15	3	+12	16	Knock-out stage		1–1				4–1	4–0
2	Omiya Ardija	6	4	2	0	5	1	+4	14	Knock-out stage					1–0	1–0	1–0
3	Ventforet Kofu	6	2	2	2	3	4	−1	8		0–2	0–0		1–0			
4	Shonan Bellmare	6	2	1	3	4	6	−2	7		0–2	0–1			0–0		
5	Júbilo Iwata	6	1	2	3	4	7	−3	5		1–2		1–0				1–3
6	Kashima Antlers	6	1	1	4	8	12	−4	4				1–2	2–3	1–1		
7	Nagoya Grampus	6	1	1	4	4	10	−6	4				0–0	0–1		1–3	

Updated to match(es) played on 5 June 2016. Source: 2016J.League Yamazaki Nabisco Cup Group Stage Group A League table and J. League Data
Legend: Blue = home team win; Yellow = draw; Red = away team win.
Rules for classification: 1) Points; 2) Goal difference; 3) Goals scored; 4) Head-to-head points; 5) Head-to-head goal difference; 6) Fair-play points; 7) Draw.

===== Matches =====
23 March 2016	Kashima Antlers	1–2	Ventforet Kofu	Kashima Soccer Stadium, Kashima
19:03	Yamamoto 60'	Report	Billy Celeski 6'; Nilson 45'	Attendance: 7,321; Referee: Koichiro Fukushima

27 March 2016	Vissel Kobe	4–1	Kashima Antlers	Noevir Stadium Kobe, Hyōgo-ku, Kobe
14:00	Pedro Júnior 23', 64'; Watanabe 37'; Soma 75'	Report	Yamamoto 84'	Attendance: 7,024; Referee: Tomohiro Inoue

6 April 2016	Nagoya Grampus	1–3	Kashima Antlers	Paloma Mizuho Stadium, Nagoya
19:04	Noda 38'	Report	Endo 52'; Caio 66'; Shoji 71'	Attendance: 6,134; Referee: Hiromichi Oka

18 May 2016	Kashima Antlers	2–3	Shonan Bellmare	Kashima Soccer Stadium, Kashima
19:00	Nagaki 11'; Doi 26'	Report	Otsuki 18'; Hasegawa 87'; Hanato 90+4'	Attendance: 5,788; Referee: Takuto Okabe

25 May 2016	Kashima Antlers	1–1	Júbilo Iwata	Kashima Soccer Stadium, Kashima, Ibaraki
19:00	Sugimoto 58'	Report	Fujita 17'	Attendance: 5,272; Referee: Masaaki Toma

5 June 2016	Omiya Ardija	1–0	Kashima Antlers	Nack5 Stadium Omiya, Ōmiya-ku, Saitama
14:00	Pečnik 87'	Report		Attendance: 9,316; Referee: (Poland) Bartosz Frankowski

=== Suruga Bank Championship ===
10 August 2016	Kashima Antlers	0–1	(Colombia) Santa Fe	Kashima Soccer Stadium, Kashima
19:00 UTC+9		Report (JFA); Report (J. League); Report (CONMEBOL)	Osorio 79'	Attendance: 19,716; Referee: Ma Ning (China)
