= Toyama Shinjo Club =

Japanese football club

- Founded: 1968
- Ground: Iwase Sports Park
- Capacity: 3,400
- Chairman: Mitsuru Murata
- Team Manager: Ryo Nojima
- League: Hokushinetsu Football League
- 2025: HFL Div. 1, 1st of 8, Champions
- Website: http://tymshinjoclub.com/

Toyama Shinjo Club (富山新庄クラブ, Toyama Shinjō Kurabu) is a Japanese football club from Shinjo, Toyama, currently playing in the Hokushin'etsu League Division One. They competed in the Emperor's Cup five times.

== History ==
Founded in 1968 by alumni of the Toyama City Shinjo Junior High School soccer club as a club that contributes to the development of youth and the community through sports.

== Stadium ==
Shinjo Club play their home games at Iwase Sports Park. It can hold 3,400 supporters, has 800 seats and floodlights.
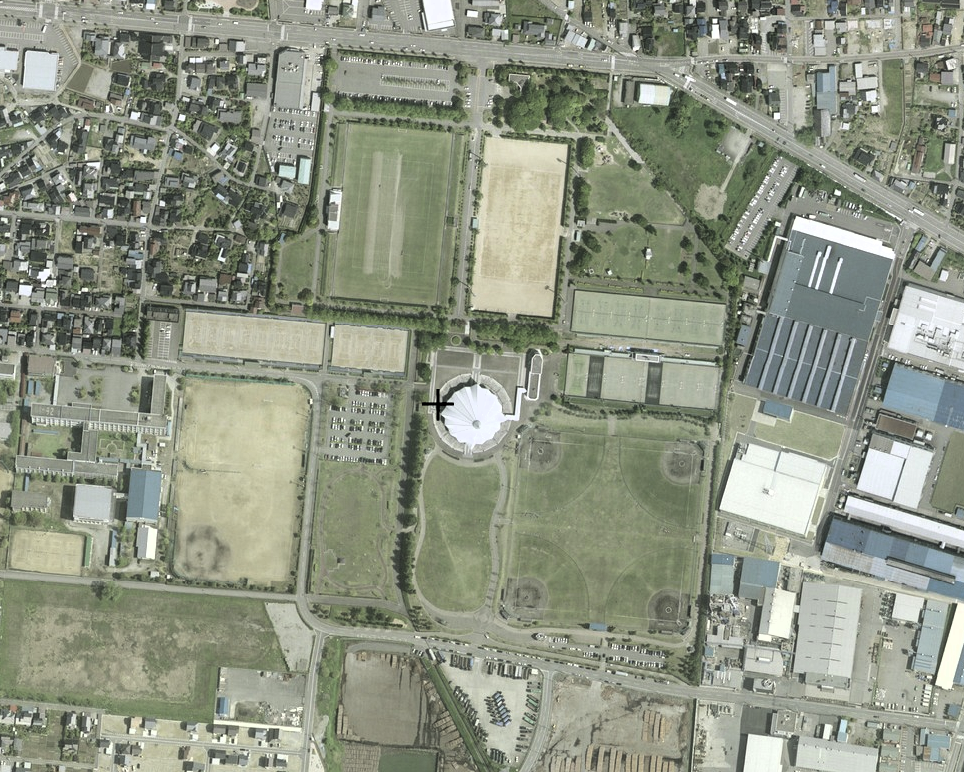

== League record ==
Champions	Runners-up	Third place	Promoted	Relegated

League											Emperor's Cup
Season	League	Pos.	P	W	D	L	F	A	GD	Pts	Emperor's Cup
2005	Hokushin'etsu Football; League (Div. 2)	2nd	13	7	3	3	20	14	6	24	Did not qualify
2006	Hokushin'etsu Football; League (Div. 2)	6th	14	5	3	6	14	21	-7	18	Did not qualify
2007	Hokushin'etsu Football; League (Div. 2)	8th	14	1	2	11	14	49	-35	5	Did not qualify
2008	Toyama Prefecture Division 1	2nd	8	6	1	1				19	Did not qualify
2009	Toyama Prefecture Division 1	1st	9	8	1	0	39	9	30	25	Did not qualify
2010	Toyama Prefecture Division 1	1st	9	8	1	0	54	4	50	25	2nd round
2011	Hokushin'etsu Football; League (Div. 2)	1st	14	12	1	1	46	12	34	37	2nd round
2012	Hokushin'etsu Football; League (Div. 1)	3rd	14	7	2	5	29	20	9	23	1st round
2013	Hokushin'etsu Football; League (Div. 1)	7th	14	2	4	8	17	36	-19	10	1st round
2014	Hokushin'etsu Football; League (Div. 2)	2nd	14	10	1	3	37	14	23	31	1st round
2015	Hokushin'etsu Football; League (Div. 1)	4th	14	6	2	6	24	21	3	20	1st round
2016	Hokushin'etsu Football; League (Div. 1)	6th	14	4	1	9	12	55	-43	13	Did not qualify
2017	Hokushin'etsu Football; League (Div. 1)	7th	14	2	3	9	17	52	-35	9	Did not qualify
2018	Hokushin'etsu Football; League (Div. 1)	6th	14	4	2	8	13	38	-25	14	Did not qualify
2019	Hokushin'etsu Football; League (Div. 1)	4th	14	5	4	5	27	31	-4	19	Did not qualify
2020 †	Hokushin'etsu Football; League (Div. 1)	3rd	7	5	0	2	20	11	9	15	2nd round
2021	Hokushin'etsu Football; League (Div. 1)	4th	16	11	1	4	39	20	19	34	Did not qualify
2022	Hokushin'etsu Football; League (Div. 1)	5th	14	6	5	3	18	13	5	23	Did not qualify
2023	Hokushin'etsu Football; League (Div. 1)	4th	14	7	4	3	28	17	11	25	Did not qualify
2024	Hokushin'etsu Football; League (Div. 1)	2nd	14	10	0	4	43	15	28	30	Did not qualify
2025	Hokushin'etsu Football; League (Div. 1)	1st	14	11	2	1	39	10	29	35	1st round
2026	Hokushin'etsu Football; League (Div. 1)	TBD	14								TBD

Key

- Pos. = Position in league; P = Games played; W = Games won; D = Games drawn; L = Games lost; F = Goals scored; A = Goals conceded; GD = Goals difference; Pts = Points gained
- † Number of games played reduced by COVID-19 worldwide pandemic

== Honours ==
Toyama Shinjo Club honours
Honour	No.	Years
Toyama Prefecture Division 1	4	1995, 2004, 2009, 2010
Toyama Prefectural Football Championship Emperor's Cup Toyama Prefectural Qualifiers	7	2010, 2011, 2012, 2013, 2014, 2015, 2020, 2025
Hokushin'etsu Football League (Div. 2)	1	2011
Hokushin'etsu Football League (Div. 1)	1	2025

== Current squad ==
As of 23 August 2023.

Note: Flags indicate national team as defined under FIFA eligibility rules; some limited exceptions apply. Players may hold more than one non-FIFA nationality.

No.	Pos.	Nation	Player
1	GK	JPN	Masataka Nomura
2	DF	JPN	Yuki Matsubara
3	DF	JPN	Masaya Sakamoto
4	DF	JPN	Junya Hirahara
5	DF	BRA	Lucas Daubermann
6	DF	JPN	Genki Hachi
7	MF	JPN	Atsuya Ushida
8	MF	JPN	Ryo Kubota
9	FW	JPN	Kosuke Nishi
10	FW	JPN	Ikki Sasaki
11	MF	JPN	Harunaga Okegawa
12	DF	JPN	Tatsuhiro Miyakoshi
13	DF	JPN	Teruki Takebayashi
15	MF	JPN	Ikumi Yamashita

No.	Pos.	Nation	Player
16	FW	JPN	Daichi Takeda
17	DF	JPN	Kyohei Ozasa
18	FW	NGR	Emah Samuel (on loan from Fukui United)
19	MF	JPN	Kazuki Nakata
20	FW	JPN	Haruto Hirakawa
21	MF	JPN	Jo Inoue
22	DF	JPN	Seiya Kubori
23	MF	JPN	Koya Matsuoka
24	FW	JPN	Yuki Takagi
25	MF	JPN	Taiki Yamashita
28	MF	JPN	Yusuke Matsuda
29	MF	JPN	Kosuke Matsuda
31	GK	JPN	Asahi Ohara
99	GK	JPN	Shu Sakai
