= Jo Inoue =

Japanese footballer

Jo Inoue 井上 丈
Personal information
- Full name: Jo Inoue
- Date of birth: May 21, 1994 (age 32)
- Place of birth: Toyama, Japan
- Height: 1.62 m (5 ft 4 in)
- Position: Midfielder

Team information
- Current team: Toyama Shinjo

Youth career
- 2007–2012: Albirex Niigata Youth

Senior career*
| Years | Team | Apps | (Gls) |
| 2013–2014 | SV Gonsenheim | | |
| 2015–2017 | Grulla Morioka | 33 | (2) |
| 2018 | Cobaltore Onagawa | 26 | (2) |
| 2019–2022 | Veertien Mie | 70 | (3) |
| 2023– | Toyama Shinjo | 0 | (0) |
- * Club domestic league appearances and goals as of 20 December 2022, 14:21 (UTC)

Jo Inoue (井上 丈, Inoue Jō; born May 21, 1994, in Toyama, Toyama) is a Japanese football player for Toyama Shinjo from 2023.

== Career ==
On 10 November 2022, Inoue leave from the club in 2022 after Veertien Mie expiration contract that player.

On 24 December 2022, Inoue joined to hometown club, Toyama Shinjo for upcoming 2023 season.

== Club statistics ==
Updated to the end 2022 season.

=== Club ===
| Club performance | | | League | | Cup | | Total | |
| Season | Club | League | Apps | Goals | Apps | Goals | Apps | Goals |
| Japan | | | League | | Emperor's Cup | | Total | |
|---|---|---|---|---|---|---|---|---|
| 2015 | Grulla Morioka | J3 League | 8 | 0 | 1 | 0 | 9 | 0 |
| 2016 | Grulla Morioka | J3 League | 14 | 2 | 0 | 0 | 14 | 2 |
| 2017 | Grulla Morioka | J3 League | 11 | 0 | 1 | 0 | 12 | 0 |
| 2018 | Cobaltore Onagawa | JFL | 26 | 2 | – | | 26 | 2 |
| 2019 | Veertien Mie | JFL | 30 | 0 | 2 | 0 | 32 | 0 |
| 2020 | Veertien Mie | JFL | 12 | 0 | 0 | 0 | 12 | 0 |
| 2021 | Veertien Mie | JFL | 27 | 3 | 0 | 0 | 27 | 3 |
| 2022 | Veertien Mie | JFL | 1 | 0 | 0 | 0 | 1 | 0 |
| 2023 | Toyama Shinjo | 0 | 0 | 0 | 0 | 0 | 0 | |
| Career total | | | 129 | 7 | 4 | 0 | 133 | 7 |
