= Takumi Watanabe =

Japanese footballer

Takumi Watanabe 渡辺 匠
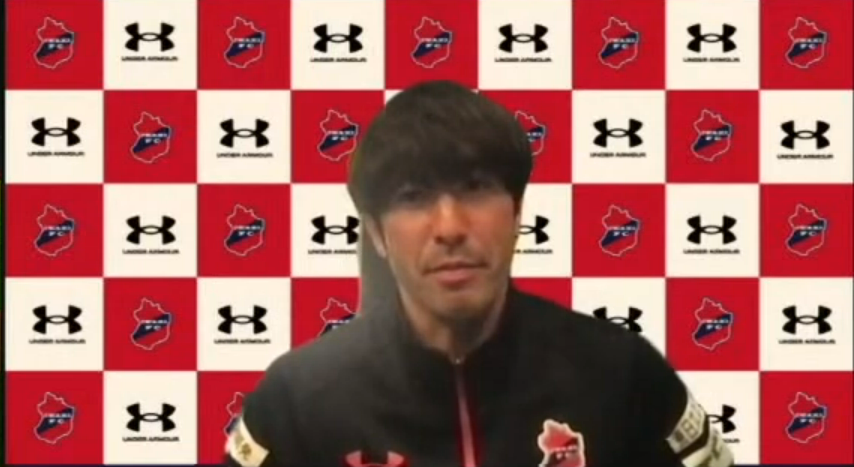

Personal information
- Full name: Takumi Watanabe (footballer)
- Date of birth: March 15, 1982 (age 44)
- Place of birth: Iwaki, Fukushima, Japan
- Position: Midfielder

Youth career
- 1997–1999: Toko Gakuen High School

Senior career*
Years	Team	Apps	(Gls)
2000–2005	Kawasaki Frontale	93	(1)
2006–2009	Montedio Yamagata	108	(4)
2010	Roasso Kumamoto	25	(0)
2011–2012	Matsumoto Yamaga FC	36	(0)
2013–2015	Yokohama FC	24	(0)
2016–2017	Fukushima United FC	34	(0)
Total		320	(5)
Medal record
Kawasaki Frontale
Runner-up	J.League Cup	2000
- * Club domestic league appearances and goals

Takumi Watanabe (渡辺 匠, Watanabe Takumi; born March 15, 1982) is a former Japanese football player.

== Playing career ==
Watanabe was born in Iwaki on March 15, 1982. After graduating from high school, he joined newly was promoted to J1 League club, Kawasaki Frontale in 2000. Immediately after joining the club, Watanabe went to Brazil for a year. He said: "I think it was a very good experience. The midfield over there was extremely intense. It felt like we were really clashing." However, Watanabe could not play at all in the match in 2000 and the club was relegated to J2 League from 2001. He played many matches as defensive midfielder from 2001. In 2003, he was converted to center back and became a regular player. However his opportunity to play decreased from 2004. Although the club won the champions in 2004 and was promoted to J1 from 2005, he could hardly play in the match in J1. In 2006, he moved to J2 club Montedio Yamagata. He became a regular player as defensive midfielder. Although his opportunity to play decreased from summer 2007, the club was promoted to J1 first time in the club history from 2009. He played many matches as substitute midfielder. In 2010, he moved to Roasso Kumamoto and played many matches. In 2011, he moved to Japan Football League club Matsumoto Yamaga FC. He played many matches and the club was promoted to J2 from 2012. In 2013, he moved to J2 club Yokohama FC. However he could not play many matches in 3 seasons. In 2016, he moved to his local club Fukushima United FC in J3 League. He played many matches as defensive midfielder and retired end of 2017 season.

== Club statistics ==
Club performance			League		Cup		League Cup		Total	
Season	Club	League	Apps	Goals	Apps	Goals	Apps	Goals	Apps	Goals
Japan			League		Emperor's Cup		J.League Cup		Total	
2000	Kawasaki Frontale	J1 League	0	0	0	0	0	0	0	0
2001	Kawasaki Frontale	J2 League	14	1	2	0	2	1	18	2
2002	Kawasaki Frontale	J2 League	14	0	4	0	-		18	0
2003	Kawasaki Frontale	J2 League	40	0	3	0	-		43	0
2004	Kawasaki Frontale	J2 League	24	0	2	0	-		26	0
2005	Kawasaki Frontale	J1 League	1	0	0	0	0	0	1	0
2006	Montedio Yamagata	J2 League	39	0	2	1	-		41	1
2007	Montedio Yamagata	J2 League	31	2	1	0	-		32	2
2008	Montedio Yamagata	J2 League	22	2	1	0	-		23	2
2009	Montedio Yamagata	J1 League	16	0	0	0	5	0	21	0
2010	Roasso Kumamoto	J2 League	25	0	2	0	–		27	0
2011	Matsumoto Yamaga FC	Football League	24	0	2	0	–		26	0
2012	Matsumoto Yamaga FC	J2 League	12	0	2	0	–		14	0
2013	Yokohama FC	J2 League	14	0	0	0	–		14	0
2014	Yokohama FC	J2 League	5	0	0	0	–		5	0
2015	Yokohama FC	J2 League	5	0	0	0	–		5	0
2016	Fukushima United FC	J3 League	16	0	1	0	–		17	0
2017	Fukushima United FC	J3 League	18	0	0	0	–		18	0
Career total			320	5	22	1	7	1	349	7
