= Hisashi Ohashi =

Japanese footballer

Hisashi Ohashi 大橋 尚志
Personal information
- Full name: Hisashi Ohashi
- Date of birth: December 1, 1996 (age 29)
- Place of birth: Tsukuba, Ibaraki, Japan
- Height: 1.83 m (6 ft 0 in)
- Position: Midfielder

Team information
- Current team: Matsumoto Yamaga
- Number: 18

Youth career
- –2008: Kukizaki Blaze FC
- 2009–2014: Kashima Antlers

Senior career*
Years	Team	Apps	(Gls)
2015–2016	Kashima Antlers	0	(0)
2015	→ J. League U-22 (loan)	6	(0)
2017–2021	Zweigen Kanazawa	174	(4)
2022–2023	Omiya Ardija	28	(0)
2024	Veertien Mie	20	(0)
2025–	Matsumoto Yamaga	23	(0)
Medal record
Kashima Antlers
Winner	J1 League	2016
Winner	J.League Cup	2015
Winner	Emperor's Cup	2016
- * Club domestic league appearances and goals as of 1 January 2026

Hisashi Ohashi (大橋 尚志, Ohashi Hisashi; born December 1, 1996) is a Japanese football player for Matsumoto Yamaga.

== Career statistics ==
Updated to end of 2018 season.

Appearances and goals by club, season and competition
Club	Season	League			Emperor's Cup		J.League Cup		Asia		Total	
Club	Season	Division	Apps	Goals	Apps	Goals	Apps	Goals	Apps	Goals	Apps	Goals
Kashima Antlers	2015	J1 League	0	0	0	0	0	0	0	0	0	0
Kashima Antlers	2016	J1 League	0	0	0	0	1	0	–		1	0
Zweigen Kanazawa	2017	J2 League	42	1	2	1	–		–		44	2
Zweigen Kanazawa	2018	J2 League	27	3	1	0	–		–		28	3
Career total			69	4	3	1	1	0	0	0	73	5
