= Takafumi Sudo =

Japanese footballer (born 1991)

Personal information
- Date of birth: 21 November 1991 (age 34)
- Place of birth: Tochigi, Japan
- Height: 1.83 m (6 ft 0 in)
- Position: Defender

Team information
- Current team: Vanraure Hachinohe
- Number: 21

Youth career
- 2007–2009: Yaita Chuo HS
- 2010–2013: Heisei International University

Senior career*
| Years | Team | Apps | (Gls) |
| 2012 | Machida Zelvia | 0 | (0) |
| 2014– | Vanraure Hachinohe | 166 | (9) |
- * Club domestic league appearances and goals as of 17:04, 13 November 2020 (UTC)

Takafumi Sudo (須藤 貴郁, Sudo Takafumi; born 21 November 1991) is a Japanese footballer currently playing as a defender for Vanraure Hachinohe.

== Career statistics ==
=== Club ===
As of 13 November 2020.

| Club | Season | League | | | National Cup | | League Cup | | Other | | Total | |
| Club | Season | Division | Apps | Goals | Apps | Goals | Apps | Goals | Apps | Goals | Apps | Goals |
|---|---|---|---|---|---|---|---|---|---|---|---|---|
| Heisei International University | 2011 | – | | | 1 (Note: Appearances in the Emperor's Cup) | 0 | – | | 0 | 0 | 1 | 0 |
| Heisei International University | 2012 | – | | | 1 | 0 | – | | 0 | 0 | 1 | 0 |
| Heisei International University | Total | | 0 | 0 | 2 | 0 | 0 | 0 | 0 | 0 | 2 | 0 |
| Vanraure Hachinohe | 2012 | J2 League | 0 | 0 | 0 | 0 | 0 | 0 | 0 | 0 | 0 | 0 |
| Vanraure Hachinohe | 2014 | JFL | 26 | 3 | 1 | 1 | – | | 0 | 0 | 27 | 4 |
| Vanraure Hachinohe | 2015 | JFL | 30 | 1 | 0 | 0 | – | | 2 (Note: Appearances in the JFL Championship) | 0 | 32 | 1 |
| Vanraure Hachinohe | 2016 | JFL | 30 | 1 | 1 | 0 | – | | 0 | 0 | 31 | 1 |
| Vanraure Hachinohe | 2017 | JFL | 26 | 0 | 2 | 0 | – | | 0 | 0 | 3 | 0 |
| Vanraure Hachinohe | 2018 | JFL | 30 | 2 | 0 | 0 | – | | 0 | 0 | 3 | 0 |
| Vanraure Hachinohe | 2019 | J3 League | 22 | 2 | 1 | 1 | – | | 0 | 0 | 23 | 3 |
| Vanraure Hachinohe | 2020 | J3 League | 2 | 0 | 0 | 0 | – | | 0 | 0 | 2 | 0 |
| Vanraure Hachinohe | Total | | 166 | 9 | 5 | 2 | 0 | 0 | 2 | 0 | 173 | 11 |
| Career total | | | 166 | 9 | 7 | 2 | 0 | 0 | 2 | 0 | 175 | 11 |
