= Kosuke Nishi =

Japanese footballer

Kosuke Nishi 西晃佑
Personal information
- Full name: Kosuke Nishi
- Date of birth: April 8, 1998 (age 28)
- Place of birth: Toyama, Japan
- Height: 1.78 m (5 ft 10 in)
- Position: Forward

Team information
- Current team: Toyama Shinjo Club
- Number: 13

Youth career
- Kataller Toyama Youth

Senior career*
Years	Team	Apps	(Gls)
2017–	Kataller Toyama	2	(0)
2018–	→ Toyama Shinjo Club (loan)		
- * Club domestic league appearances and goals as of 29 August 2018

Kosuke Nishi (西晃佑, Nishi Kosuke; born April 8, 1998) is a Japanese football player for Kataller Toyama.

== Career ==
After rising through Kataller Toyama youth ranks, Nishi was promoted to the top team in December 2016.

== Club statistics ==
Updated to 29 August 2018.

Club performance			League		Cup		Total	
Season	Club	League	Apps	Goals	Apps	Goals	Apps	Goals
Japan			League		Emperor's Cup		Total	
2017	Kataller Toyama	J3 League	0	0	0	0	0	0
2018	Kataller Toyama	J3 League	4	0	0	0	4	0
2018	Toyama Shinjo Club	JRL (Hokushinetsu)	0	0	0	0	0	0
Total			2	0	3	0	5	0
