= Tomoyasu Naito =

Japanese footballer

Personal information
- Full name: Tomoyasu Naito
- Date of birth: 11 September 1986 (age 40)
- Place of birth: Yokosuka, Kanagawa, Japan
- Height: 1.84 m (6 ft 0 in)
- Position: Goalkeeper

Team information
- Current team: Fukushima United FC
- Number: 34

Youth career
- –2004: Fujisawa Nihon High School

Senior career*
Years	Team	Apps	(Gls)
2005–2006	Nagoya Grampus Eight	0	(0)
2007	Avispa Fukuoka	0	(0)
2008	Montedio Yamagata	0	(0)
2009–2017	Fukushima United FC	86	(0)
2018–	Toho Titanium SC	0	(0)
- * Club domestic league appearances and goals as of 23 February 2016

Tomoyasu Naito (内藤 友康, Naitō Tomoyasu; born 11 September 1986 in Yokosuka, Kanagawa) is a Japanese footballer who plays for Fukushima United FC.

== Club statistics ==
Updated to 23 February 2016.

Club performance			League		Cup		League Cup		Total	
Season	Club	League	Apps	Goals	Apps	Goals	Apps	Goals	Apps	Goals
Japan			League		Emperor's Cup		J. League Cup		Total	
2005	Nagoya Grampus Eight	J1 League	0	0	0	0	0	0	0	0
2006	Nagoya Grampus Eight	J1 League	0	0	0	0	0	0	0	0
2007	Avispa Fukuoka	J2 League	0	0	0	0	–		0	0
2008	Montedio Yamagata	J2 League	0	0	0	0	–		0	0
2009	Fukushima United FC	JRL (Tohoku)	14	0	3	0	–		17	0
2010	Fukushima United FC	JRL (Tohoku)	0	0	0	0	–		0	0
2011	Fukushima United FC	JRL (Tohoku)	9	0	0	0	–		9	0
2012	Fukushima United FC	JRL (Tohoku)	8	0	2	0	–		10	0
2013	Fukushima United FC	JFL	34	0	2	0	–		36	0
2014	Fukushima United FC	J3 League	11	0	1	0	–		12	0
2015	Fukushima United FC	J3 League	10	0	0	0	–		10	0
Career total			86	0	8	0	0	0	94	0
