= Shohei Kawakami =

Japanese footballer

Personal information
- Date of birth: 26 October 1997 (age 29)
- Place of birth: Yamaguchi, Japan
- Height: 1.68 m (5 ft 6 in)
- Position: Midfielder

Team information
- Current team: Kamatamare Sanuki
- Number: 33

Youth career
- Leone Yamaguchi
- 2013–2015: Tokai Univ. Shizuoka Shoyo High School

College career
Years	Team	Apps	(Gls)
2016–2019	Senshu University		

Senior career*
Years	Team	Apps	(Gls)
2020-2024	Fujieda MYFC	68	(2)
2025-	Kamatamare Sanuki	24	(1)
- * Club domestic league appearances and goals as of 1 January 2026

Shohei Kawakami (河上 将平, Kawakami Shohei; born 26 October 1997) is a Japanese footballer currently playing as a midfielder for Kamatamare Sanuki.

== Career statistics ==
=== Club ===
As of 15 May 2021.

Club	Season	League			National Cup		League Cup		Other		Total	
Club	Season	Division	Apps	Goals	Apps	Goals	Apps	Goals	Apps	Goals	Apps	Goals
Fujieda MYFC	2020	J3 League	0	0	0	0	–		0	0	0	0
Fujieda MYFC	2021	J3 League	1	0	0	0	–		0	0	1	0
Career total			1	0	0	0	0	0	0	0	1	0
