= Yuya Torikai =

Japanese footballer

Personal information
- Date of birth: 11 May 1988 (age 38)
- Place of birth: Ichihara, Chiba, Japan
- Height: 1.72 m (5 ft 8 in)
- Positions: Midfielder; second striker

Youth career
- 2001–2006: JEF United Chiba

Senior career*
Years	Team	Apps	(Gls)
2007–2010	JEF Reserves	116	(14)
2011–2012	Sagawa Shiga FC	56	(12)
2013	FC Ryukyu	11	(0)
2014–2019	Renofa Yamaguchi FC	130	(17)
2019–2021	FC Ryukyu	38	(0)
- * Club domestic league appearances and goals

Yuya Torikai (鳥養 祐矢, Torikai Yuya; born 11 May 1988) is a Japanese former footballer who played as a second striker or midfielder.

== Club statistics ==
Updated to end of 2018 season.

Club performance			League		Cup		Total	
Season	Club	League	Apps	Goals	Apps	Goals	Apps	Goals
Japan			League		Emperor's Cup		Total	
2006	JEF Reserves	JFL	8	1	0	0	29	6
2007	JEF Reserves	JFL	24	3	-		24	3
2008	JEF Reserves	JFL	23	3	1	0	24	3
2009	JEF Reserves	JFL	29	1	1	0	30	1
2010	JEF Reserves	JFL	32	6	-		32	6
2011	Sagawa Shiga FC	JFL	29	8	2	0	31	8
2012	Sagawa Shiga FC	JFL	27	4	3	0	30	4
2013	FC Ryukyu	JFL	11	0	0	0	11	0
2014	Renofa Yamaguchi	JFL	26	5	-		26	5
2015	Renofa Yamaguchi	J3 League	35	8	1	0	36	8
2016	Renofa Yamaguchi	J2 League	25	4	3	2	28	6
2017	Renofa Yamaguchi	J2 League	16	0	0	0	16	0
2018	Renofa Yamaguchi	J2 League	27	0	2	0	29	0
Total			312	43	13	2	325	45
