= 2018 Japan Football League =

Japan Football League
- Season: 2018
- Champions: Honda FC; 8th JFL title 4th D4 title
- Promoted: Vanraure Hachinohe
- Relegated: Cobaltore Onagawa
- Matches: 240
- Goals: 674 (2.81 per match)
- Top goalscorer: Shogo Omachi; Honda FC (18 goals)
- Highest attendance: 5,241; FC Imabari v Honda Lock SC (18 November)
- Lowest attendance: 111; ReinMeer Aomori v Honda Lock SC (14 July)
- Average attendance: 907

The 2018 Japan Football League (Japanese: 第20回日本フットボールリーグ, Hepburn: Dai Nijikkai Nihon Futtobōru Rīgu) was the fifth season of the nationwide fourth tier of Japanese football, and the 20th season since the establishment of Japan Football League. The season ran from 11 March to 18 November 2018.

== Clubs ==
Sixteen clubs participated in this season of Japan Football League. The list was announced on 15 January 2018.

Club name	Home town	Position	Notes
Cobaltore Onagawa	Onagawa, Miyagi	RPS 1st	Promoted from TSL after 1st place in 41st Regional Promotion Series
FC Imabari	Imabari, Ehime	6th	J.League 100 Year Plan club status and J3 license holders
FC Osaka	All cities/towns in Osaka	4th	
Honda FC	Hamamatsu, Shizuoka	1st	Defending champions of 2017
Honda Lock	Miyazaki, Miyazaki	8th	
Maruyasu Okazaki	Okazaki, Aichi	9th	
MIO Biwako Shiga	Kusatsu, Shiga	13th	
Nara Club	All cities/towns in Nara (Note: centering on Nara)	7th	J.League 100 Year Plan club status and J3 license holders
ReinMeer Aomori	Aomori, Aomori	2nd	
Ryutsu Keizai Dragons	Ryūgasaki, Ibaraki	10th	
Sony Sendai	Tagajō, Miyagi	3rd	
Tegevajaro Miyazaki	Miyazaki, Miyazaki	RPS 2nd	Promoted from KSL after 2nd place in 41st Regional Promotion Series
Tokyo Musashino City	Musashino, Tokyo	11th	J.League 100 Year Plan club status
Vanraure Hachinohe	Eastern cities/towns in Aomori (Note: Hachinohe, Towada, Gonohe, Sannohe, Takko, Hashikami, Nanbu, Shingo, Oirase, Misawa, Shichinohe, Rokunohe, Tohoku, Noheji, Yokohama, Rokkasho)	5th	J.League 100 Year Plan club status and J3 license holders
Veertien Mie	All cities/towns in Mie (Note: centering on Kuwana & Yokkaichi)	12th	
Verspah Oita	Yufu & Ōita, Ōita	14th	

=== Personnel and kits ===
Club	Manager	Captain	Kit manufacturer
Cobaltore Onagawa	(Japan) Tatsuya Murata	(Japan) Seiya Narita	Mizuno
FC Imabari	(Japan) Hirofumi Yoshitake	(Japan) Ryoichi Kanai	Adidas
FC Osaka	(Japan) Haruo Wada	(Japan) Tomoyuki Iwamoto	New Balance
Honda FC	(Japan) Hiroyasu Ibata	(Japan) Yuya Suzuki	Umbro
Honda Lock	(Japan) Kenji Taniguchi	(Japan) Naoya Oyama	Kappa
Maruyasu Okazaki	(Japan) Ryuji Kitamura	(Japan) Keita Sugimoto	Penalty
MIO Biwako Shiga	(Japan) Masafumi Nakaguchi	vacant	Nike
Nara Club	(Japan) Norihiro Satsukawa	(Japan) Shinichi Mukai	SQUADRA
ReinMeer Aomori	(Japan) Tatsuya Mochizuki	(Japan) Kanta Takahashi	Umbro
Ryutsu Keizai Dragons	(Japan) Shunichi Nakajima	vacant	Adidas
Sony Sendai	(Japan) Shinji Honda	(Japan) Yuta Akimoto	Umbro
Tegevajaro Miyazaki	(Japan) Nobuhiro Ishizaki	(Japan) Hideo Tanaka	Penalty
Tokyo Musashino City	(Japan) Kim Jong-song	(Japan) Koji Ishihara	Yonex
Vanraure Hachinohe	(Japan) Masahiro Kuzuno	(Japan) Takafumi Sudo	ATHLETA
Veertien Mie	(Japan) Eishi Kaizu	(Japan) Katsuhisa Inamori	Mizuno
Verspah Oita	(Japan) Shigemitsu Sudo	(Japan) Makoto Nakamura	Warrix Sports

== Change in rules ==
This season was the last to use the two-stage format, similar to the one J.League had in its early years and used in 2015 and 2016. Two single round-robin stages were held, and winners of each stage determined the champion in the post-season home and away championship playoffs. After five seasons, the JFL reverted to a one-stage double round-robin starting in 2019.

== League table ==
Pos	Team	Pld	W	D	L	GF	GA	GD	Pts	Qualification
1	Honda FC (C)	30	25	4	1	76	25	+51	79	
2	FC Osaka	30	18	3	9	54	34	+20	57	
3	**Vanraure Hachinohe** (P)	30	16	8	6	43	21	+22	56	Promotion to 2019 J3 League (Note: To qualify for promotion, a club must hold a 100 Year Plan status, obtain J3 license (marked in bold in the table), and finish both in the top 4 of the JFL, and either 1st or 2nd among the promotion-eligible clubs.)
4	Sony Sendai	30	16	4	10	67	43	+24	52	
5	**FC Imabari**	30	14	7	9	63	32	+31	49	
6	**Tokyo Musashino City**	30	14	7	9	49	36	+13	49	
7	MIO Biwako Shiga	30	13	7	10	38	35	+3	46	
8	**Nara Club**	30	12	6	12	33	32	+1	42	
9	Verspah Oita	30	11	6	13	29	38	−9	39	
10	ReinMeer Aomori	30	10	7	13	38	48	−10	37	
11	Veertien Mie	30	9	8	13	40	52	−12	35	
12	Tegevajaro Miyazaki	30	9	5	16	43	60	−17	32	
13	Maruyasu Okazaki	30	8	7	15	33	46	−13	31	
14	Honda Lock	30	6	11	13	29	52	−23	29	
15	Ryutsu Keizai Dragons	30	4	7	19	20	50	−30	19	
16	Cobaltore Onagawa (R)	30	4	5	21	18	65	−47	17	Relegation to 2019 Regional Leagues

Source: JFL website (in Japanese)
Rules for classification: 1) Points; 2) Goal difference; 3) Goals scored; 4) Head-to-head results; 5) Disciplinary points; 6) Draw
(C) Champions; (P) Promoted; (R) Relegated

== Top scorers ==
As of match played 18 November 2018.

Rank	Player	Club	Goals
1	(Japan) Shogo Omachi	Honda FC	18
2	(Japan) Koji Ishihara	Tokyo Musashino City FC	17
3	(Japan) Shogo Fujimaki	Veertien Mie	16
3	(Japan) Motoki Fujiwara	Sony Sendai FC	16
5	(Japan) Kazuki Sakamoto	MIO Biwako Shiga	15
5	(Japan) Jun Arima	FC Imabari	15
7	(Japan) Shota Suzuki	Sony Sendai FC	14
7	(Japan) Ryōta Kuwajima	FC Imabari	14
9	(Japan) Sachio Hamada	ReinMeer Aomori FC	13
10	(Japan) Shoma Mizunaga	Tegevajaro Miyazaki	12

== Attendances ==
Pos	Team	Total	High	Low	Average	Change
1	FC Imabari	46,219	4,805	2,006	3,081	+41.3%
2	Vanraure Hachinohe	33,114	4,075	1,107	2,208	+4.8%
3	Nara Club	26,925	2,443	994	1,795	+24.0%
4	Veertien Mie	12,732	1,263	594	849	+7.2%
5	Tokyo Musashino City	12,657	1,413	495	844	+19.5%
6	Honda FC	12,288	1,753	489	819	−4.9%
7	FC Osaka	11,823	1,923	241	788	+32.0%
8	Verspah Oita	8,734	1,414	236	582	+43.0%
9	Cobaltore Onagawa	8,056	1,313	207	537	n/a
10	ReinMeer Aomori	7,696	1,337	111	513	−28.8%
11	MIO Biwako Shiga	7,674	1,526	182	512	−21.4%
12	Sony Sendai FC	7,014	1,006	190	468	+32.6%
13	Ryutsu Keizai Dragons	6,903	727	161	460	+48.4%
14	Tegevajaro Miyazaki	6,052	831	203	403	n/a
15	Maruyasu Okazaki	5,343	658	208	356	−9.6%
16	Honda Lock SC	4,581	626	160	305	−7.3%
	League total	217,721	4,805	111	907	+13.8%

Updated to games played on 18 November 2018
Source: JFL

== Promotion from Regional Leagues ==
Matsue City and Suzuka Unlimited
