= Ryosuke Matsuoka =

Japanese footballer

Ryosuke Matsuoka 松岡 亮輔
Personal information
- Full name: Ryosuke Matsuoka
- Date of birth: October 23, 1984 (age 42)
- Place of birth: Nishinomiya, Hyōgo, Japan
- Height: 1.73 m (5 ft 8 in)
- Position: Midfielder

Team information
- Current team: Berkeley Goats FC
- Number: 30

Youth career
- 1997–2002: Cerezo Osaka Youth
- 2003–2006: Hannan University

Senior career*
Years	Team	Apps	(Gls)
2007–2011	Vissel Kobe	102	(4)
2012–2013	Júbilo Iwata	6	(0)
2014–2018	Montedio Yamagata	93	(3)
2019–	Fujieda MYFC	34	(0)
Medal record
Montedio Yamagata
Runner-up	Emperor's Cup	2014
- * Club domestic league appearances and goals as of 1 January 2020

Ryosuke Matsuoka (松岡 亮輔, Matsuoka Ryosuke; born October 23, 1984 in Hyōgo) is a Japanese football player who plays for Berkeley Goats FC.

== Career statistics ==
Updated to 1 January 2020.

Appearances and goals by club, season and competition
Club	Season	League			Emperor's Cup		J.League Cup		Total	
Club	Season	Division	Apps	Goals	Apps	Goals	Apps	Goals	Apps	Goals
Vissel Kobe	2007	J1 League	0	0	0	0	0	0	0	0
Vissel Kobe	2008	J1 League	28	0	2	0	6	0	36	0
Vissel Kobe	2009	J1 League	29	1	2	0	5	0	36	1
Vissel Kobe	2010	J1 League	23	1	0	0	5	0	28	1
Vissel Kobe	2011	J1 League	22	2	2	1	2	0	26	3
Júbilo Iwata	2012	J1 League	1	0	0	0	2	1	3	1
Júbilo Iwata	2013	J1 League	5	0	1	0	1	0	7	0
Montedio Yamagata	2014	J2 League	34	1	3	0	—		37	1
Montedio Yamagata	2015	J1 League	16	0	0	0	2	1	18	1
Montedio Yamagata	2016	J2 League	27	2	3	2	—		30	4
Montedio Yamagata	2017	J2 League	12	0	1	0	—		13	0
Montedio Yamagata	2018	J2 League	3	0	2	0	—		5	0
Fujieda MYFC	2019	J3 League	34	0	—		—		34	0
Career total			234	7	16	3	23	2	273	12
