= Kim Kong-chyong =

Zainichi Korean footballer (born 1986)

Personal information
- Full name: Kim Kong-chyong
- Date of birth: September 2, 1986 (age 40)
- Place of birth: Hyogo, Japan
- Height: 1.70 m (5 ft 7 in)
- Position: Midfielder

Youth career
- 2005–2008: Ryutsu Keizai University FC

Senior career*
Years	Team	Apps	(Gls)
2009–2017	Fukushima United FC	111	(25)
- * Club domestic league appearances and goals as of 2 February 2018

Kim Kong-chyong (Korean: 김공청; Hanja: 金功青, born September 2, 1986, in Hyogo) is a former South Korean football player for Fukushima United FC.

== Club statistics ==
Updated to 2 February 2018.

Club performance			League		Cup		Total	
Season	Club	League	Apps	Goals	Apps	Goals	Apps	Goals
Japan			League		Emperor's Cup		Total	
2009	Fukushima United FC	JRL (Tohoku, Div. 1)	14	0	2	0	16	7
2010	Fukushima United FC	JRL (Tohoku, Div. 1)	3	0	0	0	3	0
2011	Fukushima United FC	JRL (Tohoku, Div. 1)	10	7	2	3	12	10
2012	Fukushima United FC	JRL (Tohoku, Div. 1)	11	6	0	0	11	6
2013	Fukushima United FC	JFL	22	2	2	0	24	2
2014	Fukushima United FC	J3 League	20	1	0	0	20	1
2015	Fukushima United FC	J3 League	8	0	0	0	8	0
2016	Fukushima United FC	J3 League	11	2	0	0	11	2
2017	Fukushima United FC	J3 League	12	0	0	0	12	0
Career total			111	25	6	3	117	28
