= Shogo Omachi =

Japanese footballer

Personal information
- Full name: Shogo Omachi
- Date of birth: May 4, 1992 (age 34)
- Place of birth: Shimabara, Nagasaki, Japan
- Height: 1.73 m (5 ft 8 in)
- Position: Forward

Youth career
- 2011–2012: Tokoha University

Senior career*
Years	Team	Apps	(Gls)
2013–2017	Zweigen Kanazawa	54	(5)
2016–2017	→ Honda FC (loan)	49	(23)
2018–2020	Honda FC	61	(23)
- * Club domestic league appearances and goals as of 20 February 2021

Shogo Omachi (大町 将梧, Ōmachi Shōgo; born May 4, 1992) is a retired Japanese football player. He plays for Honda FC.

== Playing career ==
Shogo Omachi played for Zweigen Kanazawa from 2013 to 2015. In 2016, he moved on loan to Honda FC.

After five seasons with Honda FC, Omachi opted to retire.

== Career statistics ==
Updated to 20 February 2021.

Appearances and goals by club, season and competition
Club	Season	League			Emperor's Cup		Total	
Club	Season	Division	Apps	Goals	Apps	Goals	Apps	Goals
Zweigen Kanazawa	2013	JFL	13	1	1	0	14	1
Zweigen Kanazawa	2014	J3 League	30	4	2	3	32	7
Zweigen Kanazawa	2015	J2 League	11	0	1	0	12	0
Honda FC	2016	JFL	26	7	4	3	30	10
Honda FC	2017	JFL	23	16	1	2	24	18
Honda FC	2018	JFL	29	18	2	0	31	18
Honda FC	2019	JFL	21	3	2	1	23	4
Honda FC	2020	JFL	11	2	4	2	15	4
Career total			164	51	17	11	181	62
