= Tatsuya Suzuki (footballer, born 1993) =

Japanese footballer

Tatsuya Suzuki 鈴木 達也
Personal information
- Full name: Tatsuya Suzuki
- Date of birth: July 8, 1993 (age 33)
- Place of birth: Saitama, Japan
- Height: 1.72 m (5 ft 7 1/2 in)
- Position: Defender

Youth career
- 2009–2012: Kashiwa Reysol
- 2012–2015: Meiji University

Senior career*
Years	Team	Apps	(Gls)
2016–2019	Grulla Morioka	82	(5)
- * Club domestic league appearances and goals as of 22 February 2018

Tatsuya Suzuki (鈴木 達也, Suzuki Tatsuya; born July 8, 1993) is a Japanese football player. He played for Grulla Morioka.

Tatsuya Suzuki joined J3 League club Grulla Morioka in 2016.
