= Kazuma Umenai =

Japanese footballer

Kazuma Umenai 梅内和磨
Personal information
- Full name: Kazuma Umenai
- Date of birth: 21 June 1991 (age 35)
- Place of birth: Kiyose, Tokyo, Japan
- Height: 1.78 m (5 ft 10 in)
- Positions: Defender; midfielder

Team information
- Current team: Tokyo United FC
- Number: 11

Youth career
- 2010–2013: Meiji University FC

Senior career*
Years	Team	Apps	(Gls)
2014–2015	YSCC Yokohama	51	(6)
2016–2019	Grulla Morioka	121	(14)
2020–	Tokyo United FC		
- * Club domestic league appearances and goals as of 23 February 2020

Kazuma Umenai (梅内和磨, Umenai Kazuma; born 21 June 1991) is a Japanese footballer who plays for Grulla Morioka.

== Club statistics ==
Updated to 23 February 2020.

Club performance			League		Cup		Total	
Season	Club	League	Apps	Goals	Apps	Goals	Apps	Goals
Japan			League		Emperor's Cup		Total	
2014	YSCC Yokohama	J3 League	19	1	1	0	20	1
2015	YSCC Yokohama	J3 League	32	5	–		32	5
2016	Iwate Grulla Morioka	J3 League	29	5	3	3	32	8
2017	Iwate Grulla Morioka	J3 League	32	6	2	0	34	6
2018	Iwate Grulla Morioka	J3 League	30	2	0	0	30	2
2019	Iwate Grulla Morioka	J3 League	30	1	1	0	31	1
Career total			172	20	7	3	179	23
