= Yusuke Matsuda =

Japanese footballer

Personal information
- Full name: Yusuke Matsuda
- Date of birth: April 23, 1991 (age 35)
- Place of birth: Kyoto, Japan
- Height: 1.70 m (5 ft 7 in)
- Position: Midfielder

Team information
- Current team: MIO Biwako Shiga
- Number: 24

Youth career
- 2007–2009: Gamba Osaka Youth
- 2010–2013: Kyoto Sangyo University

Senior career*
Years	Team	Apps	(Gls)
2014–2015	FC Ryukyu	7	(0)
2015	Saurcos Fukui	6	(3)
2016–2017	Tochigi Uva FC	57	(1)
2018–	MIO Biwako Shiga		
- * Club domestic league appearances and goals as of 27 February 2018

Yusuke Matsuda (松田 悠佑, Matsuda Yusuke; born April 23, 1991) is a Japanese football player. He plays for MIO Biwako Shiga. Kosuke Matsuda is his brother.

== Playing career ==
Yusuke Matsuda joined to J3 League club; FC Ryukyu in 2014. In June 2015, he moved to Saurcos Fukui. In 2016, he moved to Tochigi Uva FC.

== Club statistics ==
Updated to 27 February 2018.

Club performance			League		Cup		Total	
Season	Club	League	Apps	Goals	Apps	Goals	Apps	Goals
Japan			League		Emperor's Cup		Total	
2014	FC Ryukyu	J3 League	7	0	1	0	8	0
2015	FC Ryukyu	J3 League	0	0	0	0	0	0
2015	Saurcos Fukui	JRL (Hokushinetsu, Div. 1)	6	3	1	0	7	3
2016	Tochigi Uva FC	JFL	29	1	1	0	30	1
2017	Tochigi Uva FC	JFL	28	0	2	0	30	0
Total			70	4	5	0	75	4
