= Kento Sugino =

Japanese footballer

Personal information
- Full name: Kento Sugino
- Date of birth: February 25, 1992 (age 34)
- Place of birth: Gifu, Japan
- Height: 1.78 m (5 ft 10 in)
- Position: Defender

Youth career
- 2010–2013: Tokai Gakuen University

Senior career*
Years	Team	Apps	(Gls)
2014–2017	Fukushima United FC	53	(1)
- * Club domestic league appearances and goals as of 2 February 2018

Kento Sugino (杉野 健斗, Sugino Kento; born February 25, 1992 in Gifu) is a former Japanese football player for Fukushima United FC.

== Club statistics ==
Updated to 2 February 2018.

Club performance			League		Cup		Total	
Season	Club	League	Apps	Goals	Apps	Goals	Apps	Goals
Japan			League		Emperor's Cup		Total	
2014	Fukushima United FC	J3 League	25	1	0	0	25	1
2015	Fukushima United FC	J3 League	11	0	0	0	11	0
2016	Fukushima United FC	J3 League	6	0	1	0	7	0
2017	Fukushima United FC	J3 League	11	0	0	0	11	0
Career total			53	1	1	0	54	1
