= Daiki Hotta =

Japanese footballer

Daiki Hotta 堀田 大暉
Personal information
- Full name: Daiki Hotta
- Date of birth: October 5, 1994 (age 32)
- Place of birth: Miyagi, Japan
- Height: 1.82 m (5 ft 11 1/2 in)
- Position: Goalkeeper

Team information
- Current team: Vegalta Sendai
- Number: 1

Youth career
- Kamo FC
- –2012: Vegalta Sendai

College career
Years	Team	Apps	(Gls)
2013–2016	Tokai University		

Senior career*
Years	Team	Apps	(Gls)
2017–2019	Fukushima United	59	(0)
2020–2022	Shonan Bellmare	0	(0)
2020	→ Zweigen Kanazawa (loan)	0	(0)
2022	→ Fagiano Okayama (loan)	28	(0)
2023–2024	Fagiano Okayama	33	(0)
2025–	Vegalta Sendai	6	(0)
- * Club domestic league appearances and goals as of 17 August 2026

Daiki Hotta (堀田 大暉, Hotta Daiki; born October 5, 1994) is a Japanese footballer who plays as a goalkeeper for Vegalta Sendai.

== Career ==
After attending Tokai University, Hotta joined Fukushima United FC in January 2017. On 6 May 2017, he was seriously injured during a training session. Hotta made his league debut against Thespa Gunma on 11 March 2018.

On 2 January 2020, Hotta was announced at Shonan Bellmare.

On 29 June 2020, Hotta was announced at Zweigen Kanazawa on a two month loan. On 31 July 2020, he was recalled from his loan spell early.

On 31 March 2022, Hotta was announced at Fagiano Okayama on a loan deal. He made his league debut against Oita Trinita on 21 May 2022.

On 24 November 2022, Hotta was announced at Fagiano Okayama on a permanent deal. He made his league debut against Iwaki FC on 2 April 2023.

On 20 December 2024, Hotta was announced at Vegalta Sendai.

== Club statistics ==
As of 6 April 2023.

Appearances and goals by club, season and competition
Club	Season	League			National Cup		League Cup		Total	
Club	Season	Division	Apps	Goals	Apps	Goals	Apps	Goals	Apps	Goals
Japan			League		Emperor's Cup		J. League Cup		Total	
Fukushima United FC	2017	J3 League	0	0	0	0	–		0	0
Fukushima United FC	2018	J3 League	26	0	0	0	–		26	0
Fukushima United FC	2019	J3 League	33	0	0	0	–		33	0
Fukushima United FC	Total		59	0	0	0	0	0	59	0
Shonan Bellmare	2020	J1 League	0	0	0	0	0	0	0	0
Shonan Bellmare	2021	J1 League	0	0	0	0	0	0	0	0
Shonan Bellmare	Total		0	0	0	0	0	0	0	0
Zweigen Kanazawa (loan)	2020	J2 League	0	0	0	0	–		0	0
Fagiano Okayama (loan)	2022	J2 League	28 (Note: Includes appearance in J1/J2 play-offs)	0	0	0	–		28	0
Fagiano Okayama	2023	J2 League	1	0	0	0	–		1	0
Career total			88	0	0	0	0	0	88	0
