= Shuhei Mitsuhashi =

Japanese footballer

Shuhei Mitsuhashi 三橋 秀平
Personal information
- Full name: Shuhei Mitsuhashi
- Date of birth: July 18, 1994 (age 32)
- Place of birth: Kanagawa, Japan
- Height: 1.67 m (5 ft 5 1/2 in)
- Position: Midfielder

Youth career
- 2013–2016: Kanto Gakuin University

Senior career*
Years	Team	Apps	(Gls)
2017–2018	Fukushima United FC	33	(4)
2019	Phnom Penh Crown FC	5	(0)
- * Club domestic league appearances and goals as of 22 February 2018

Shuhei Mitsuhashi (三橋 秀平, Mitsuhashi Shuhei; born July 18, 1994) is a Japanese football player. He plays for Phnom Penh Crown FC.

== Career ==
Shuhei Mitsuhashi joined J3 League club Fukushima United FC in 2017.

== Club statistics ==
Updated to 22 February 2018.

Club performance			League		Cup		Total	
Season	Club	League	Apps	Goals	Apps	Goals	Apps	Goals
Japan			League		Emperor's Cup		Total	
2017	Fukushima United FC	J3 League	20	3	0	0	20	3
Total			20	3	0	0	20	3
