= Ikki Sasaki =

Japanese footballer

Personal information
- Full name: Ikki Sasaki
- Date of birth: 19 February 1991 (age 35)
- Place of birth: Tokushima, Japan
- Height: 1.70 m (5 ft 7 in)
- Position: Forward

Team information
- Current team: Kataller Toyama
- Number: 13

Youth career
- 2009–2012: Kyoto Sangyo University

Senior career*
Years	Team	Apps	(Gls)
2013–2016	Tokushima Vortis	25	(0)
2017–	Kataller Toyama	24	(6)
- * Club domestic league appearances and goals as of 23 February 2018

Ikki Sasaki (佐々木一輝, Sasaki Ikki; born 19 February 1991 in Tokushima) is a Japanese footballer who plays for Kataller Toyama.

== Career statistics ==
Updated to 23 February 2018.

Appearances and goals by club, season and competition
Club	Season	League			Emperor's Cup		J.League Cup		Total	
Club	Season	Division	Apps	Goals	Apps	Goals	Apps	Goals	Apps	Goals
Tokushima Vortis	2013	J2 League	3	0	0	0	–		3	0
Tokushima Vortis	2014	J1 League	16	0	1	0	1	0	18	0
Tokushima Vortis	2015	J2 League	4	0	1	0	–		5	0
Tokushima Vortis	2016	J2 League	2	0	2	1	–		4	1
Kataller Toyama	2017	J3 League	24	6	1	0	–		25	6
Career total			49	6	5	1	1	0	55	7
