= Soichi Tanaka =

Japanese footballer

Soichi Tanaka 田中 奏一
Personal information
- Full name: Soichi Tanaka
- Date of birth: June 27, 1989 (age 37)
- Place of birth: Tokyo, Japan
- Height: 1.72 m (5 ft 7 1/2 in)
- Position: Defender

Team information
- Current team: Kagoshima United FC
- Number: 26

Youth career
- 2002–2007: FC Tokyo
- 2008–2011: Keio University

Senior career*
Years	Team	Apps	(Gls)
2012–2017	Fagiano Okayama	91	(7)
2018–	Kagoshima United FC	30	(4)
- * Club domestic league appearances and goals as of 5 January 2019

Soichi Tanaka (田中 奏一, born June 27, 1989) is a Japanese football player. He primarily played as a defender and began his professional career with Fagiano Okayama in 2012. He later represented Kagoshima United FC and Nara Club

== Career statistics ==
Updated to end of 2018 season.

Appearances and goals by club, season and competition
Club	Season	League			Emperor's Cup		Total	
Club	Season	Division	Apps	Goals	Apps	Goals	Apps	Goals
Fagiano Okayama	2012	J2 League	2	0	1	0	3	0
Fagiano Okayama	2013	J2 League	31	2	1	0	32	2
Fagiano Okayama	2014	J2 League	28	3	1	0	29	3
Fagiano Okayama	2015	J2 League	12	0	0	0	12	0
Fagiano Okayama	2016	J2 League	14	2	3	0	17	2
Fagiano Okayama	2017	J2 League	4	0	2	0	6	0
Kagoshima United	2018	J3 League	30	4	0	0	30	4
Career total			121	11	8	0	129	11
