= Takaya Osanai =

Japanese footballer

Takaya Osanai 小山内 貴哉
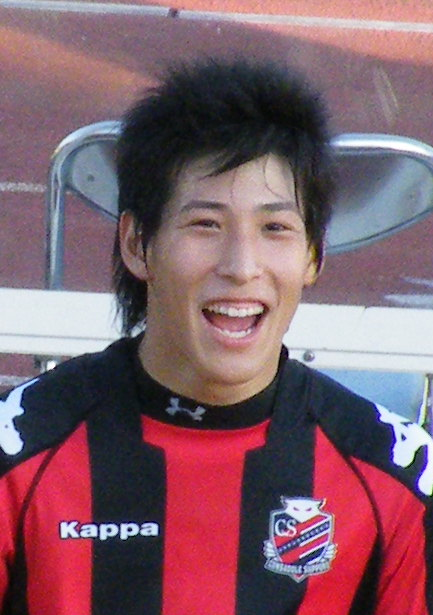

Personal information
- Full name: Takaya Osanai
- Date of birth: June 15, 1993 (age 33)
- Place of birth: Sapporo, Japan
- Height: 1.76 m (5 ft 9 1/2 in)
- Position: Defender

Team information
- Current team: ReinMeer Aomori
- Number: 3

Youth career
- Consadole Sapporo Youth

Senior career*
Years	Team	Apps	(Gls)
2011–2016	Consadole Sapporo	16	(1)
2014–2015	→ J. League U-22 (loan)	4	(0)
2015	→ Nagano Parceiro (loan)	8	(1)
2016	→ Fukushima United FC (loan)	0	(0)
2017	Fukushima United FC	4	(0)
2018–	ReinMeer Aomori		
- * Club domestic league appearances and goals as of 23 February 2018

Takaya Osanai (小山内 貴哉, Osanai Takaya; born June 15, 1993) is a Japanese football player for ReinMeer Aomori.

== Career statistics ==
Updated to 23 February 2018.

Appearances and goals by club, season and competition
Club	Season	League			Emperor's Cup		J.League Cup		Total	
Club	Season	Division	Apps	Goals	Apps	Goals	Apps	Goals	Apps	Goals
Consadole Sapporo	2011	J2 League	0	0	1	0	—		1	0
Consadole Sapporo	2012	J1 League	0	0	0	0	1	0	1	0
Consadole Sapporo	2013	J2 League	5	0	1	0	—		6	0
Consadole Sapporo	2014	J2 League	11	1	0	0	—		11	1
Consadole Sapporo	2015	J2 League	0	0	0	0	—		0	0
AC Nagano Parceiro	2015	J3 League	8	1	1	0	—		9	1
Fukushima United FC	2016	J3 League	0	0	0	0	—		0	0
Fukushima United FC	2017	J3 League	4	0	—		—		4	0
Career total			28	2	3	0	1	0	32	2
