= Kazuto Ishido =

Japanese footballer

Kazuto Ishido 石堂和人
Personal information
- Full name: Kazuto Ishido
- Date of birth: 1 April 1982 (age 44)
- Place of birth: Kuki, Saitama, Japan
- Height: 1.79 m (5 ft 10 in)
- Position: Midfielder

Youth career
- Sano Nihon Daigaku High School
- Teikyo University

Senior career*
Years	Team	Apps	(Gls)
2005–2006	Nagano Parceiro	2	(0)
2006	Matsumoto Yamaga	11	(1)
2007–2010	Machida Zelvia	64	(13)
2011–2018	Fukushima United FC	140	(22)
- * Club domestic league appearances and goals as of 23 December 2018

Kazuto Ishido (石堂和人, Ishido Kazuto; born 1 April 1982) is a retired Japanese footballer who played for Fukushima United as a midfielder.

== Club statistics ==
Updated to 23 December 2018.

Club performance			League		Cup		Total	
Season	Club	League	Apps	Goals	Apps	Goals	Apps	Goals
Japan			League		Emperor's Cup		Total	
2005	Nagano Parceiro	JRL (Hokushinetsu, Div. 1)	0	0	-		0	0
2006	Nagano Parceiro	JRL (Hokushinetsu, Div. 1)	2	0	-		2	0
2006	Matsumoto Yamaga	JRL (Hokushinetsu, Div. 1)	11	1	2	0	13	1
2007	Machida Zelvia	JRL (Kantō, Div. 1)	13	8	-		13	8
2008	Machida Zelvia	JRL (Kantō, Div. 1)	14	3	-		14	3
2009	Machida Zelvia	JFL	34	2	-		34	2
2010	Machida Zelvia	JFL	3	0	0	0	3	0
2011	Fukushima United FC	JRL (Tohoku, Div. 1)	10	4	2	0	12	4
2012	Fukushima United FC	JRL (Tohoku, Div. 1)	5	4	1	0	6	4
2013	Fukushima United FC	JFL	19	2	2	0	21	2
2014	Fukushima United FC	J3 League	30	3	1	0	31	3
2015	Fukushima United FC	J3 League	35	4	1	0	36	4
2016	Fukushima United FC	J3 League	19	5	0	0	19	5
2017	Fukushima United FC	J3 League	15	0	-		15	0
2018	Fukushima United FC	J3 League	17	0	-		17	0
Total			227	36	9	0	236	36
