= Aizu Athletic Park Stadium =

Athletic stadium in Aizuwakamatsu, Fukushima, Japan

- 会津総合運動公園あいづ陸上競技場
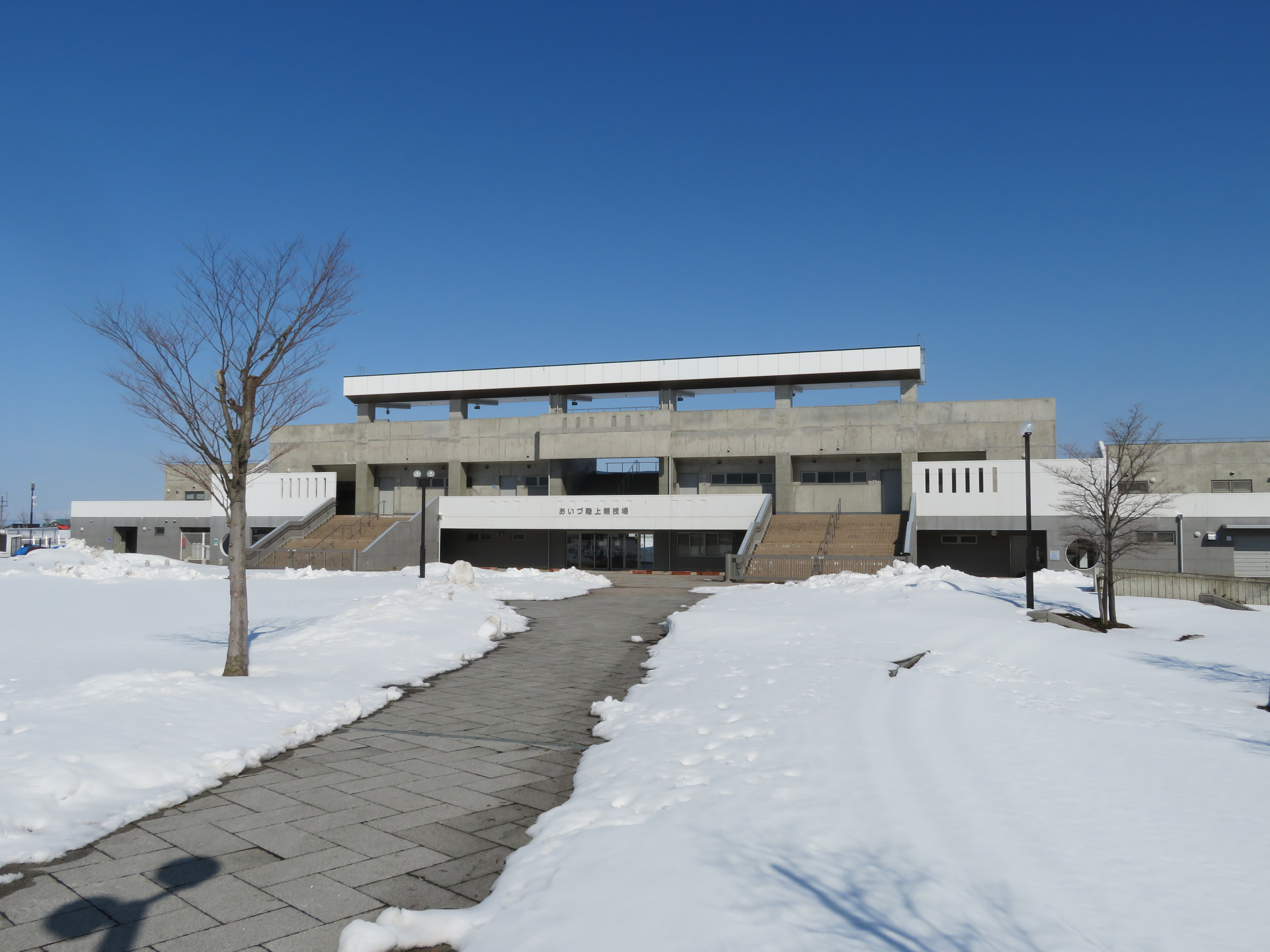
- Interactive map of Aizu Athletic Park Stadium
- Location: Aizuwakamatsu, Fukushima, Japan
- Coordinates: 37°27′44″N 139°55′32″E
- Capacity: 7,300

Construction
- Opened: 2013

Tenant
- Fukushima United FC

Website
- Official site

Aizu Athletic Park Stadium (会津総合運動公園あいづ陸上競技場) is an athletic stadium in Aizuwakamatsu, Fukushima Prefecture, Japan.

It is one of the home stadiums of football club Fukushima United FC.
