= Takashi Kamoshida =

Japanese footballer (born 1985)

Takashi Kamoshida 鴨志田 誉
Personal information
- Full name: Takashi Kamoshida
- Date of birth: August 5, 1985 (age 41)
- Place of birth: Ebina, Kanagawa, Japan
- Height: 1.74 m (5 ft 8 1/2 in)
- Position: Midfielder

Youth career
- 2001–2003: Zama High School
- 2004–2007: Kanagawa University

Senior career*
Years	Team	Apps	(Gls)
2008–2011	Tochigi SC	80	(2)
2012–2018	Fukushima United FC	160	(9)
- * Club domestic league appearances and goals as of 23 February 2019

Takashi Kamoshida (鴨志田 誉, Kamoshida Takashi; born August 5, 1985 in Ebina, Kanagawa) is a Japanese football player. He currently plays for Fukushima United FC.

== Career statistics ==
Updated to 23 February 2019.

Club performance			League		Cup		Total	
Season	Club	League	Apps	Goals	Apps	Goals	Apps	Goals
Japan			League		Emperor's Cup		Total	
2008	Tochigi SC	JFL	19	1	1	0	20	1
2009	Tochigi SC	J2 League	48	1	1	0	49	1
2010	Tochigi SC	J2 League	6	0	1	0	7	0
2011	Tochigi SC	J2 League	7	0	0	0	7	0
2012	Fukushima United FC	JRL (Tohoku, Div. 1)	7	1	2	0	9	1
2013	Fukushima United FC	JFL	33	2	2	0	35	2
2014	Fukushima United FC	J3 League	33	2	1	0	34	2
2015	Fukushima United FC	J3 League	30	1	1	0	31	1
2016	Fukushima United FC	J3 League	18	0	2	1	20	1
2017	Fukushima United FC	J3 League	29	2	–		29	2
2018	Fukushima United FC	J3 League	10	1	–		10	1
Total			240	11	11	1	251	12
