= Ryota Okada =

Japanese footballer

Ryota Okada 岡田亮太
Personal information
- Full name: Ryota Okada
- Date of birth: 9 September 1988 (age 38)
- Place of birth: Tokyo, Japan
- Height: 1.83 m (6 ft 0 in)
- Position: Defender

Team information
- Current team: Fukushima United FC
- Number: 2

Youth career
- 2004–2006: Teikyo Daisan High School

College career
Years	Team	Apps	(Gls)
2007–2010	Teikyo University		

Senior career*
Years	Team	Apps	(Gls)
2011–	Fukushima United FC	167	(5)
- * Club domestic league appearances and goals as of 23 February 2018

Ryota Okada (岡田亮太, Okada Ryōta; born 9 September 1988 in Tokyo) is a Japanese footballer who plays for Fukushima United FC.

== Club statistics ==
Updated to 23 February 2018.

Club performance			League		Cup		Total	
Season	Club	League	Apps	Goals	Apps	Goals	Apps	Goals
Japan			League		Emperor's Cup		Total	
2011	Fukushima United FC	JRL (Tohoku)	12	1	2	0	14	1
2012	Fukushima United FC	JRL (Tohoku)	9	0	2	0	11	0
2013	Fukushima United FC	JFL	34	0	2	0	36	0
2014	Fukushima United FC	J3 League	17	0	1	0	18	0
2015	Fukushima United FC	J3 League	36	2	1	0	37	2
2016	Fukushima United FC	J3 League	29	1	2	0	31	1
2017	Fukushima United FC	J3 League	30	1	–		30	1
Career total			167	5	10	0	177	5
