= Takuto Hashimoto =

Japanese footballer

Personal information
- Full name: Takuto Hashimoto
- Date of birth: April 11, 1991 (age 35)
- Place of birth: Chiba, Japan
- Height: 1.75 m (5 ft 9 in)
- Position: Midfielder

Team information
- Current team: Veertien Mie
- Number: 16

Youth career
- 2010–2013: Kokushikan University

Senior career*
Years	Team	Apps	(Gls)
2014–2020	Fukushima United FC	203	(7)
2021–	Veertien Mie		
- * Club domestic league appearances and goals as of 23 February 2021

Takuto Hashimoto (橋本拓門, Hashimoto Takuto; born April 11, 1991) is a Japanese football player for Veertien Mie.

== Career statistics ==
Updated to 31 December 2020.

Appearances and goals by club, season and competition
Club	Season	League			Emperor's Cup		Total	
Club	Season	Division	Apps	Goals	Apps	Goals	Apps	Goals
Fukushima United FC	2014	J3 League	31	2	1	0	32	2
Fukushima United FC	2015	J3 League	35	1	1	0	36	1
Fukushima United FC	2016	J3 League	21	0	2	0	23	0
Fukushima United FC	2017	J3 League	32	1	–		32	1
Fukushima United FC	2018	J3 League	31	3	–		31	3
Fukushima United FC	2019	J3 League	32	0	–		32	0
Fukushima United FC	2020	J3 League	21	0	–		21	0
Career total			203	7	4	0	207	7
