= 2012 Japanese Regional Leagues =

Japanese amateur leagues football season

Japanese Regional Leagues
- Season: 2012

The 2012 Japanese Regional Leagues were a competition between parallel association football leagues ranking at the bottom of the Japan Football League.

== Champions list ==
Region	Champions
Hokkaidō	Norbritz Hokkaidō
Tohoku	Fukushima United
Kantō	S.C. Sagamihara
Hokushin'etsu	Saurcos Fukui
Tōkai	Suzuka Rampole
Kansai	Amitie S.C.
Chūgoku	Dezzolla Shimane
Shikoku	FC Imabari
Kyushu	FC Kagoshima

== League standings ==
=== Hokkaidō ===
Pos	Team	Pld	W	D	L	GF	GA	GD	Pts
1	Club Fields Norbritz Hokkaido	14	14	0	0	71	2	+69	42
2	Tokachi Fairsky Genesis	14	11	0	3	46	22	+24	33
3	Sapporo University Goal Plunderers	14	7	0	7	23	23	0	21
4	Sapporo Shukyudan	14	6	2	6	29	20	+9	20
5	Toyota Motor Hokkaido	14	5	2	7	20	42	−22	17
6	Rokkatei Marseitz	14	4	2	8	14	35	−21	14
7	Komazawa OB F.C.	14	2	2	10	17	42	−25	8
8	Ẽfini VANKEI F.C.	14	2	2	10	11	45	−34	8

Source: RSSSF

=== Tohoku ===
==== Division 1 ====
Pos	Team	Pld	W	D	L	GF	GA	GD	Pts
1	Fukushima United	12	11	0	1	61	6	+55	33
2	Grulla Morioka	12	10	0	2	48	5	+43	30
3	Shiogama NTFC Wiese	12	6	1	5	26	29	−3	19
4	Akita F.C. Cambiare	12	5	1	6	21	36	−15	16
5	F.C. Primeiro	12	3	1	8	16	35	−19	10
6	Fuji Club 2003	12	3	1	8	13	40	−27	10
7	Morioka Zebra	12	1	2	9	11	45	−34	5

Source: RSSSF

==== Division 2 North ====
Pos	Team	Pld	W	D	L	GF	GA	GD	Pts
1	F.C. Ganju Iwate	14	13	0	1	88	13	+75	39
2	Vanraure Hachinohe	14	12	1	1	74	8	+66	37
3	Reinmeer Aomori F.C.	14	8	2	4	41	32	+9	26
4	Mizusawa Club	14	7	0	7	27	37	−10	21
5	Omiya Club	14	5	1	8	17	43	−26	16
6	TDK Shinwakai	14	2	3	9	25	36	−11	9
7	Nippon Steel Kamaishi	14	2	3	9	20	48	−28	9
8	Tono Club	14	0	4	10	10	85	−75	4

Source: RSSSF

==== Division 2 South ====
Pos	Team	Pld	W	D	L	GF	GA	GD	Pts
1	Bandits Iwaki	14	11	3	0	45	13	+32	36
2	Cobaltore Onagawa	14	11	2	1	48	11	+37	35
3	Marysol Matsusima S.C.	14	6	2	6	30	30	0	20
4	F.C. Scheinen Fukushima	14	6	2	6	30	32	−2	19 (Note: 1 point deducted?)
5	Iwaki Furukawa F.C.	14	6	0	8	19	29	−10	18
6	Sendai Nakada F.C.	14	4	2	8	21	33	−12	13
7	Merry	14	2	3	9	22	40	−18	9
8	F.C. Parafrente Yonezawa	14	2	2	10	12	39	−27	8

Source: RSSSF

=== Kantō ===
==== Division 1 ====
Pos	Team	Pld	W	D	L	GF	GA	GD	Pts
1	S.C. Sagamihara	18	15	2	1	42	13	+29	47
2	Aries F.C. Tokyo	18	10	3	5	35	28	+7	33
3	Vertfee Takahara Nasu	18	8	5	5	27	20	+7	29
4	Tonan Maebashi	18	8	4	6	34	29	+5	28
5	Ryutsu Keizai University	18	7	6	5	37	28	+9	27
6	Saitama S.C.	18	7	5	6	35	38	−3	26
7	F.C. Korea	18	6	2	10	28	34	−6	20
8	Club Dragons	18	6	2	10	29	36	−7	20
9	Toho Titanium S.C.	18	5	3	10	26	38	−12	18
10	Kanagawa Teachers S.C.	18	1	2	15	15	44	−29	5

Source: RSSSF

==== Division 2 ====
Pos	Team	Pld	W	D	L	GF	GA	GD	Pts
1	Tokyo 23 F.C.	18	12	3	3	48	22	+26	39
2	Hitachi Building System	18	11	3	4	31	17	+14	36
3	Urayasu	18	7	6	5	29	20	+9	27
4	Yokohama Takeru	18	7	5	6	32	27	+5	26
5	JMSDF Atsugi Marcus	18	6	6	6	30	32	−2	24
6	A.C. Almaleza	18	7	2	9	19	28	−9	23
7	Nippon Engineering College F.Marinos	18	6	2	10	28	36	−8	20
8	Tokio Marine & Nichido Fire Insurance	18	6	2	10	21	29	−8	20
9	Mitsubishi Yowa	18	6	2	10	29	41	−12	20
10	Pioneer Kawagoe	18	4	5	9	21	36	−15	17

Source: RSSSF

=== Hokushin'etsu ===
==== Division 1 ====
Pos	Team	Pld	W	D	L	GF	GA	GD	Pts
1	Saurcos Fukui	14	12	1	1	56	7	+49	37
2	Japan Soccer College	14	11	2	1	57	9	+48	35
3	Toyama Shinjo Club	14	7	2	5	29	20	+9	23
4	Artista Tomi	14	6	1	7	25	17	+8	19
5	Teihens F.C.	14	6	1	7	26	36	−10	19
6	F.C. Antelope Shiojiri	14	4	2	8	22	45	−23	14
7	F.C. Ueda Gentian	14	4	0	10	25	41	−16	12
8	Granscena Niigata	14	1	1	12	7	72	−65	4

Source: RSSSF

==== Division 2 ====
Pos	Team	Pld	W	D	L	GF	GA	GD	Pts
1	Valiente Toyama	14	8	3	3	29	14	+15	27
2	F.C. Hokuriku	14	8	3	3	32	23	+9	27
3	Sakai Phoenix	14	7	5	2	26	20	+6	26
4	Nagaoka Billboard F.C.	14	6	5	3	31	23	+8	23
5	Cups Seiro	14	7	2	5	33	26	+7	23
6	'09 Keidai F.C.	14	4	6	4	24	20	+4	18
7	Fukui KSC	14	1	3	10	15	36	−21	6
8	Okuetsu	14	0	3	11	12	40	−28	3

Source: RSSSF

=== Tōkai ===
==== Division 1 ====
Pos	Team	Pld	W	D	L	GF	GA	GD	Pts
1	F.C. Suzuka Rampole	14	9	4	1	28	15	+13	31
2	F.C. Gifu SECOND	14	9	3	2	40	21	+19	30
3	Maruyasu Industries	14	7	2	5	33	25	+8	23
4	F.C. Kariya	14	5	3	6	23	17	+6	18
5	Fujieda City Hall	14	4	3	7	19	24	−5	15
6	Yazaki Valente	14	5	0	9	18	40	−22	15
7	Chukyo University A	14	4	2	8	21	28	−7	14
8	Chukyo University B	14	3	3	8	22	34	−12	12

Source: RSSSF

==== Division 2 ====
Pos	Team	Pld	W	D	L	GF	GA	GD	Pts
1	Toyota Shukyudan	14	12	1	1	47	15	+32	37
2	Azul Claro Numazu	14	8	2	4	22	15	+7	26
3	F.C. Kawasaki	14	5	4	5	22	24	−2	19
4	Nagara Club	14	6	1	7	28	36	−8	19
5	Kasugai Club	14	5	3	6	27	25	+2	18
6	Hamamatsu University F.C.	14	5	3	6	20	25	−5	18
7	Ise YAMATO F.C.	14	4	2	8	18	25	−7	14
8	Konica Minolta S.C. Toyokawa	14	2	2	10	16	35	−19	8

Source: RSSSF

=== Kansai ===
==== Division 1 ====
Pos	Team	Pld	W	D	L	GF	GA	GD	Pts
1	Amitie S.C.	14	10	3	1	47	13	+34	33
2	Nara Club	14	8	5	1	28	11	+17	29
3	Ain Foods	14	6	3	5	24	28	−4	21
4	Banditonce Kakogawa	14	4	7	3	21	17	+4	19
5	Arterivo Wakayama	14	4	5	5	11	20	−9	17
6	AS.Laranja Kyoto	14	4	1	9	12	26	−14	13
7	Panasonic Energy Sumoto	14	2	4	8	11	22	−11	10
8	Diablossa Nara	14	1	6	7	24	41	−17	9

Source: RSSSF

==== Division 2 ====
Pos	Team	Pld	W	D	L	GF	GA	GD	Pts
1	F.C. Osaka	14	13	0	1	52	7	+45	36 (Note: 3 points deducted?)
2	Lagend Shiga FC	14	10	2	2	41	19	+22	32
3	Kandai F.C. 2008	14	8	3	3	40	14	+26	27
4	Hannan University F.C.	14	6	5	3	35	25	+10	23
5	Kwangaku Club	14	6	3	5	24	26	−2	21
6	Biwako S.C. Hira	14	2	1	11	7	45	−38	7
7	Kyoto Shiko Club	14	2	0	12	7	44	−37	6
8	OSAKA KOREAN FC	14	1	2	11	5	31	−26	5

Source: RSSSF

=== Chūgoku ===
Pos	Team	Pld	W	D	L	GF	GA	GD	Pts
1	Dezzolla Shimane	18	14	3	1	61	16	+45	45
2	Fagiano Okayama Next	18	11	5	2	51	18	+33	38
3	Matsue City FC	18	12	2	4	36	25	+11	38
4	Renofa Yamaguchi	18	9	5	4	47	22	+25	32
5	Mitsubishi Motors Mizushima F.C.	18	7	5	6	45	43	+2	26
6	Fuji Xerox Hiroshima S.C.	18	8	2	8	43	39	+4	26
7	JX Nippon Oil & Energy Mizushima F.C.	18	4	3	11	26	53	−27	15
8	NTN Okayama	18	3	5	10	20	47	−27	14
9	Hitachi Kasado S.C.	18	3	1	14	17	57	−40	10
10	S.C. Tottori Dreams	18	1	5	12	19	45	−26	8

Source: RSSSF

=== Shikoku ===
Pos	Team	Pld	W	D	L	GF	GA	GD	Pts
1	FC Imabari	14	11	1	2	44	10	+34	34
2	Kuroshio F.C.	14	9	2	3	32	16	+16	29
3	Nangoku Kōchi F.C.	14	8	1	5	34	21	+13	25
4	Nankoku Torasutā	14	7	1	6	37	32	+5	22
5	Tadotsu F.C.	14	7	1	6	32	37	−5	22
6	Panasonic Energy Tokushima S.C.	14	5	1	8	26	41	−15	16
7	Minami Club	14	4	2	8	18	35	−17	14
8	R.VELHO	14	0	1	13	14	44	−30	1

Source: RSSSF

=== Kyushu ===
Pos	Team	Pld	W	PKW	PKL	L	GF	GA	GD	Pts
1	F.C. Kagoshima	18	17	0	0	1	76	11	+65	51
2	Volca Kagoshima	18	14	2	0	2	63	16	+47	46
3	Mitsubishi Heavy Industrial Nagasaki S.C.	18	11	1	2	4	42	25	+17	37
4	Nippon Steel Corp. Oita	18	11	0	1	6	53	31	+22	34
5	Kaiho Bank SC	18	9	1	1	7	34	39	−5	30
6	Kyushu Mitsubishi Motors	18	3	4	1	10	27	60	−33	18
7	Saga LIXIL F.C.	18	5	1	0	12	33	38	−5	17
8	Kyushu Sogo Sports College F.C.	18	4	1	2	11	36	54	−18	16
9	MSU FC	18	3	0	2	13	21	61	−40	11
10	Liberty F.C.	18	2	1	2	13	16	66	−50	10

Source: RSSSF
