= Toho Stadium =

Athletic stadium in Fukushima, Japan

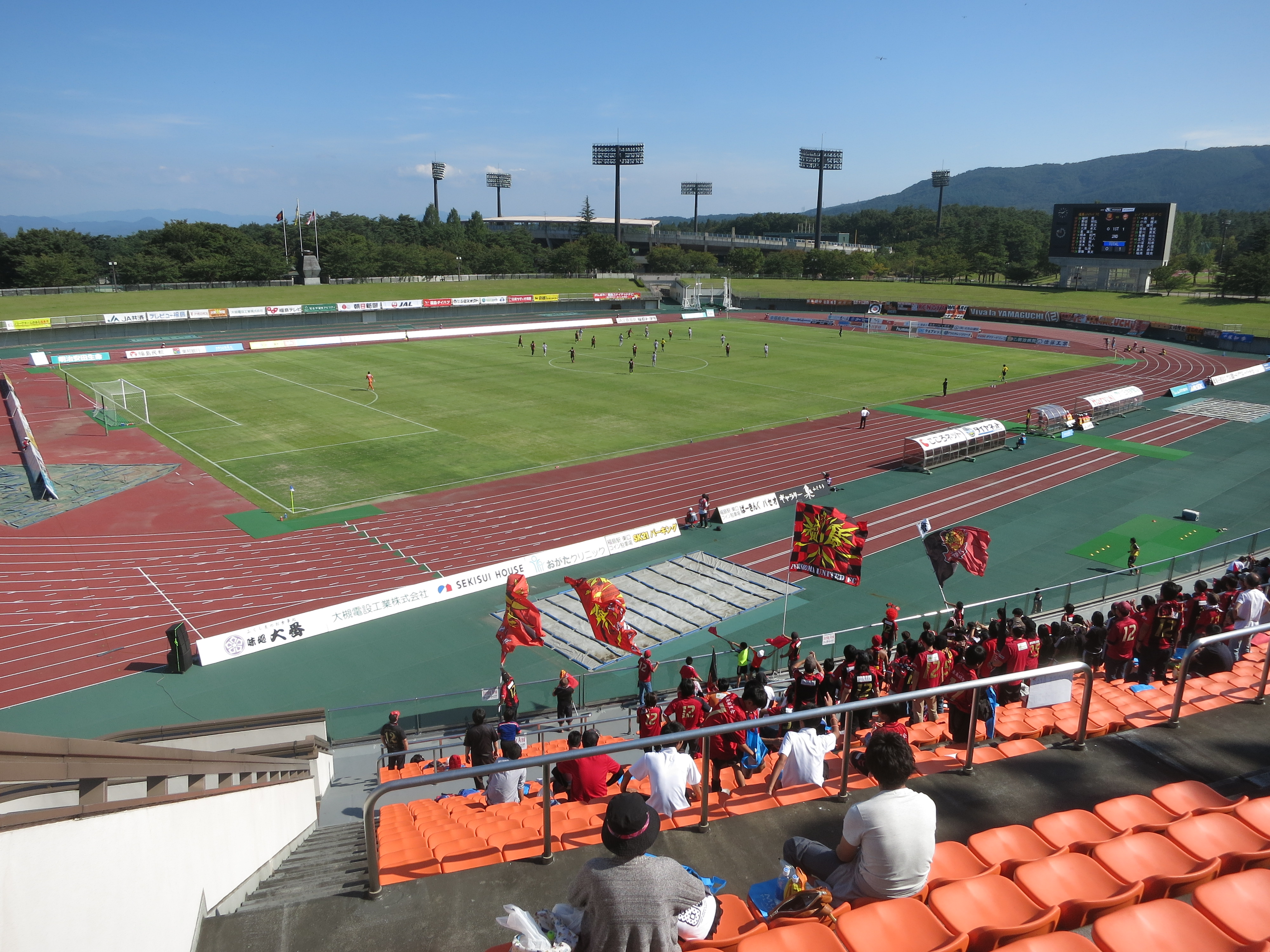

- Location within Fukushima Prefecture Location within Tohoku, Japan Location within Japan
- Interactive map of Toho Stadium
- Full name: Toho Minna no Stadium
- Former names: Azuma Athletic Stadium (1994–2013)
- Location: Fukushima, Fukushima, Japan
- Coordinates: 37.723333°N 140.361389°E
- Owner: Fukushima Prefecture
- Capacity: 6,464 (seating capacity)
- Surface: Natural grass
- Screen: Large video equipment: High-brightness full-color LEDs

Construction
- Opened: 1994

Tenant
- Fukushima United FC

Tōhō Minna no Stadium (とうほう・みんなのスタジアム, Tōhō Minna no Sutajiumu), also known as Toho Stadium or Tōsuta (とうスタ) for short, is an athletic stadium in Fukushima, Fukushima Prefecture, Japan.

It was initially known as Azuma Athletic Stadium (福島県営あづま陸上競技場, Fukushima Ken'ei Azuma Rikujō Kyōgijō). Since May 2013, it has been called Toho Stadium, after the naming rights were acquired by Toho Bank.

It is the home stadium of football club Fukushima United FC.

== Facility overview ==
- Japan Athletics Federation Class 1 Official Recognition
- Track: 9 400m lanes
- Surface: Natural grass ground
- Field size: 105m × 70m
- Capacity: 21,000 (Main Stand: 6,464 seats; Lawn Stand: 14,000 seats)
  - However, in the J.League, as a rule, grass seats and buffer zones are not added to the capacity, so the official capacity is listed as 6,464 seats.
- Lighting equipment: 4 1,500L units
- Large video equipment: High-brightness full-color LEDs, installed in 2014 near corners 1 and 2
- Ancillary facilities: Auxiliary athletic stadium with 8 400m-lap courses, all-weather pavement (with night lighting)

== Naming rights ==
Naming rights are solicited for the purpose of raising maintenance and operating costs for this stadium. There were applications from two companies in Fukushima Prefecture, and a contract was signed in May 2013 with Toho Bank. The contact was initially due to terminate on 31 March 2018. The total value of the contract is 52.5 million yen.
