= Naoki Maeda (footballer, born 1996) =

Japanese footballer

Naoki Maeda 前田 尚輝
Personal information
- Full name: Naoki Maeda
- Date of birth: June 11, 1996 (age 30)
- Place of birth: Yokosuka, Kanagawa, Japan
- Height: 1.68 m (5 ft 6 in)
- Position: Midfielder

Youth career
- 2012–2014: Shonan Bellmare Youth

Senior career*
Years	Team	Apps	(Gls)
2013–2018	Shonan Bellmare	0	(0)
2015–2018	→ Fukushima United FC (loan)	77	(2)
2019	Iwaki FC	17	(4)
2021	Musan Salama	24	(1)
2022	Angkor Tiger	0	(0)
- * Club domestic league appearances and goals as of 23 February 2020

Naoki Maeda (前田 尚輝, Maeda Naoki; born June 11, 1996) is a Japanese football player.

== Playing career ==
Naoki Maeda joined Shonan Bellmare in 2013. In 2015, he moved to Fukushima United FC.

== Career statistics ==
Updated to 23 February 2020.

Appearances and goals by club, season and competition
Club	Season	League			Emperor's Cup		J.League Cup		Total	
Club	Season	Division	Apps	Goals	Apps	Goals	Apps	Goals	Apps	Goals
Shonan Bellmare	2013	J1 League	0	0	1	0	0	0	1	0
Shonan Bellmare	2014	J2 League	0	0	1	0	—		1	0
Fukushima United FC	2015	J3 League	3	1	0	0	—		3	1
Fukushima United FC	2016	J3 League	24	1	2	1	—		26	2
Fukushima United FC	2017	J3 League	27	0	—		—		27	0
Fukushima United FC	2018	J3 League	23	0	—		—		23	0
Iwaki FC	2019	JRL (Tohoku, Div. 1)	17	4	1	0	—		18	4
Career total			94	6	5	1	0	0	99	7
