= 2017 All Japan Senior Football Championship =

Shakaijin Cup

Tournament details
- Country: Japan
- Dates: 14 October 2017 – 18 October 2017
- Teams: 32

Final positions
- Champions: Suzuka Unlimited FC (1st title)
- Runners-up: Matsue City FC

Tournament statistics
- Matches played: 32
- Goals scored: 116 (3.63 per match)
- Top goal scorer(s): Hayato Mine (Vonds Ichihara; 5 goals)

The 53rd All Japan Senior Football Championship (Japanese: 第53回全国社会人サッカー選手権大会, Hepburn: Dai 53-kai zenkoku shakai hito sakkā senshuken taikai), officially the 2017 All Japan Adults Football Tournament, and most known as the 2017 Shakaijin Cup, was the 53rd edition of the annually contested single-elimination tournament (or cup) for non-league clubs.

== Calendar ==
Round	Date	Matches	Teams
Round of 32	14 October 2017	16	32 → 16
Round of 16	15 October 2017	8	16 → 8
Quarter-finals	16 October 2017	4	8 → 4
Semi-finals	17 October 2017	2	4 → 2
3rd place match	18 October 2017	1	2
Final	18 October 2017	1	2 → 1

== Schedule ==
=== Round of 32 ===
No.	Home	Score	Away
1	Suzuka Unlimited FC	5–1	Okinawa SV
2	Tokyo IU Dreamers	1–1 (4–3 pen.)	Banditonce Kakogawa
3	Iwaki FC	4–0	Aries Tokyo
4	Amitie SC Kyoto	6–1	SRC Hiroshima
5	Toyota Motors Hokkaido FC	0–6	FC Tiamo Hirakata
6	Tadotsu FC	1–2	Chukyo univ.FC
7	International Pacific University	0–4	Tokyo 23 FC
8	Japan Soccer College	2–1	J.FC Miyazaki
9	Sapporo FC	3–2	Kaiho Bank SC
10	Waseda United	1–3	Matsue City FC
11	Artista Asama	5–0	Ain Foods
12	Fuji Club 2003	0–2	Yazaki Valente FC
13	FC Ise-Shima	0–1	Tegevajaro Miyazaki
14	Arterivo Wakayama	2–1	Vertfee Takahara Nasu
15	Kochi United SC	1–3	Vonds Ichihara
16	Sapporo Goal Plunderers	1–3	Saurcos Fukui

=== Round of 16 ===
No.	Home	Score	Away
17	Suzuka Unlimited FC	4–0	Tokyo IU Dreamers
18	Iwaki FC	1–1 (3–5 pen.)	Amitie SC Kyoto
19	FC Tiamo Hirakata	3–1	Chukyo univ.FC
20	Tokyo 23 FC	1–1 (6–7 pen)	Japan Soccer College
21	Sapporo FC	1–2	Matsue City FC
22	Artista Asama	3–0	Yazaki Valente FC
23	Tegevajaro Miyazaki	1–2	Arterivo Wakayama
24	Vonds Ichihara	4–3	Saurcos Fukui

=== Quarter-finals ===
No.	Home	Score	Away
25	Suzuka Unlimited FC	2–0	Amitie SC Kyoto
26	FC Tiamo Hirakata	2–0	Japan Soccer College
27	Matsue City FC	2–1	Artista Asama
28	Artista Asama	2–3	Vonds Ichihara

=== Semi-finals ===
No.	Home	Score	Away
29	Suzuka Unlimited FC	5–0	FC Tiamo Hirakata
30	Matsue City FC	0–0 (4–2 pen.)	Vonds Ichihara

=== Third place match ===
No.	Home	Score	Away
31	FC Tiamo Hirakata	1–4	Vonds Ichihara

=== Final ===
No.	Home	Score	Away
32	Suzuka Unlimited FC	2–1	Matsue City FC

== See also ==
- 2017 J1 League
- 2017 J2 League
- 2017 J3 League
- 2017 Japanese Regional Leagues
- 2017 Emperor's Cup
- 2017 J.League Cup
