= 2015 Emperor's Cup =

Tournament details
- Country: Japan
- Teams: 88

Final positions
- Champions: Gamba Osaka (5th title)
- Runners-up: Urawa Red Diamonds

Tournament statistics
- Matches played: 87

The 95th Emperor's Cup (第95回天皇杯全日本サッカー選手権大会) was the regular edition of the annual Japanese national cup tournament, which was held from 29 August 2015 to its final on 1 January 2016.

The winners, Gamba Osaka, qualified to the group stage of the 2016 AFC Champions League.

== Calendar ==
Round	Date	Matches	Clubs	New entries this round
First round	29, 30 August	36	47+1+2+22 → 36	47 prefectural cup winners; 1 JFL Apertura winner; 22 J2 clubs; 2 second and playoff winners from the 2014 J2
Second round	5, 6, 9 September	24	36+12 → 24	12 J1 clubs (except 4 J1 seeded teams)
Third round	10, 11, 14 October	12	24 → 12	
Fourth round	11, 14, 15 November	8	12+4 → 8	4 J1 seeded teams including: 2 ACL Quarter-finals Participants; Top 2 teams of J1 1st stage
Quarterfinals	26 December	4	8 → 4	
Semifinals	29 December	2	4 → 2	
Final	1 January 2016	1	2 → 1	

== Participating clubs ==
88 clubs competed in the tournament. The 18 clubs from 2015 J1 League and 22 clubs from 2015 J2 League received a bye to the second round of the tournament. The other 47 teams earned berths by winning their respective prefectural cup tournaments, and entered from the first round along with the JFL seeded team, the Apertura Champion.

2015 J1 League all clubs	2015 J2 League all clubs	2015 Japan Football League; Apertura Champion	47 prefectural tournament winners	
Albirex Niigata; Kashima Antlers; Shonan Bellmare; Montedio Yamagata; Yokohama F. Marinos; Kawasaki Frontale; Gamba Osaka; Nagoya Grampus; Urawa Red Diamonds; Kashiwa Reysol; Shimizu S-Pulse; Sagan Tosu; Sanfrecce Hiroshima; FC Tokyo; Vegalta Sendai; Ventforet Kofu; Vissel Kobe; Matsumoto Yamaga	Avispa Fukuoka; Omiya Ardija; Consadole Sapporo; Ehime FC; Fagiano Okayama; FC Gifu; Giravanz Kitakyushu; Mito HollyHock; JEF United Chiba; Júbilo Iwata; Kamatamare Sanuki; Zweigen Kanazawa; Cerezo Osaka; Roasso Kumamoto; Kyoto Sanga; Thespakusatsu Gunma; Tochigi SC; Oita Trinita; Tokyo Verdy; V-Varen Nagasaki; Tokushima Vortis; Yokohama FC	Vanraure Hachinohe	Hokkaido: Sapporo University; Aomori: ReinMeer Aomori; Iwate: Grulla Morioka; Miyagi: Sendai University; Akita: Blaublitz Akita; Yamagata: Yamagata University; Fukushima: Fukushima United FC; Ibaraki: Ryutsu Keizai University; Tochigi: Tochigi Uva FC; Gunma: Tonan Maebashi; Saitama: Tokyo International University; Chiba: Juntendo University; Tokyo: FC Machida Zelvia; Kanagawa: Toin University of Yokohama; Yamanashi: Nirasaki Astros; Nagano: AC Nagano Parceiro; Niigata: Japan Soccer College; Toyama: Toyama Shinjo Club; Ishikawa: Hokuriku University; Fukui: Saurcos Fukui; Shizuoka: Fujieda MYFC; Aichi: FC Maruyasu Okazaki; Mie: Yokkaichi University; Gifu: FC Gifu Second	Shiga: MIO Biwako Shiga; Kyoto: Ritsumeikan University; Osaka: FC Osaka; Hyōgo: Kwansei Gakuin University; Nara: Nara Club; Wakayama: Arterivo Wakayama; Tottori: Gainare Tottori; Shimane: Matsue City FC; Okayama: Fagiano Okayama Next; Hiroshima: Hiroshima University of Economics; Yamaguchi: Renofa Yamaguchi FC; Kagawa: Tadotsu FC; Tokushima: Tokushima University Hippocrates; Ehime: FC Imabari; Kōchi: Kōchi University; Fukuoka: Fukuoka University; Saga: Saga Lixil; Nagasaki: Mitsubishi Nagasaki SC; Kumamoto: Tokai University; Ōita: Verspah Oita; Miyazaki: J.FC Miyazaki; Kagoshima: Kagoshima United FC; Okinawa: FC Ryukyu

== Results ==
=== First round ===
29 August 2015 No.1	FC Maruyasu Okazaki	1–4	Toin University of Yokohama	Nagoya City Minato Soccer Stadium, Nagoya
13:00				Attendance: 613

29 August 2015 No.2	Matsumoto Yamaga	3–0	Saurcos Fukui	Matsumotodaira Football Stadium, Matsumoto, Nagano
16:00				Attendance: 5,960

30 August 2015 No.3	Zweigen Kanazawa	6–3 (a.e.t.)	FC Imabari	Ishikawa Kanazawa Stadium, Kanazawa
16:00				Attendance: 1,241

29 August 2015 No.4	Oita Trinita	2–0	Saga Lixil	Ōita Bank Dome, Ōita
19:00				Attendance: 2,004

29 August 2015 No.5	V-Varen Nagasaki	7–0	Mitsubishi Nagasaki SC	Nagasaki Athletic Stadium, Isahaya, Nagasaki
18:00				Attendance: 1,259

29 August 2015 No.6	MIO Biwako Shiga	3–2 (a.e.t.)	Arterivo Wakayama	Higashiomi Nunobiki Sports Park Athletics Stadium, Higashiōmi
13:00				Attendance: 329

30 August 2015 No.7	Toyama Shinjo Club	0–5	FC Ryukyu	Toyama Athletic Stadium, Toyama
17:00				Attendance: 780

29 August 2015 No.8	Mito HollyHock	4–2	ReinMeer Aomori	K's denki Stadium Mito, Mito, Ibaraki
18:00				Attendance: 1,327

29 August 2015 No.9	Giravanz Kitakyushu	2–1	J.FC Miyazaki	Honjō Athletic Stadium, Kitakyushu
16:00				Attendance: 712

29 August 2015 No.10	Nirasaki Astros	0–3	Juntendo University	Yamanashi Chuo Bank Stadium, Kōfu
13:00				Attendance: 339

29 August 2015 No.11	Cerezo Osaka	1–2	FC Osaka	Kincho Stadium, Osaka
18:00				Attendance: 4,467

30 August 2015 No.12	Ehime FC	1–0	Tadotsu FC	Ningineer Stadium, Matsuyama, Ehime
19:00				Attendance: 1,039

29 August 2015 No.13	Yokkaichi University	1–6	Verspah Oita	Suzuka Sports Garden, Suzuka, Mie
13:00				Attendance: 313

29 August 2015 No.14	Consadole Sapporo	5–1	Sapporo University	Sapporo Atsubetsu Park Stadium, Sapporo
13:03				Attendance: 2,489

30 August 2015 No.15	Yokohama FC	3–0	Tonan Maebashi	Nippatsu Mitsuzawa Stadium, Yokohama
18:00				Attendance: 1,256

30 August 2015 No.16	Blaublitz Akita	3–0	Fukushima United	Akita Municipal Yabase Football Stadium, Akita
13:00				Attendance: 468

29 August 2015 No.17	Tokushima Vortis	7–0	Fagiano Okayama Next	Pocarisweat Stadium, Naruto, Tokushima
15:00				Attendance: 1,224

29 August 2015 No.18	Thespakusatsu Gunma	1–2	FC Gifu Second	Gunma Shikishima Soccer Stadium, Maebashi
15:00				Attendance: 1,008

29 August 2015 No.19	Nara Club	0–0 (a.e.t.) (5–6 p)	Fujieda MYFC	Nara Prefectural Kashihara Oyakesono Athletics Stadium, Kashihara, Nara
13:00				Attendance: 540

29 August 2015 No.20	Montedio Yamagata	7–1	Yamagata University	ND Soft Stadium Yamagata, Tendō, Yamagata
19:04				Attendance: 2,159

30 August 2015 No.21	Kamatamare Sanuki	1–0	Kōchi University	Kagawa Marugame Stadium, Marugame, Kagawa
19:00				Attendance: 1,505

30 August 2015 No.22	Hiroshima University of Economics	2–0	Tokushima University Hippocrates	Hiroshima Regional Park, Hiroshima
16:00				Attendance: 344

29 August 2015 No.23	Roasso Kumamoto	1–0	Fukuoka University	Suizenji Stadium, Kumamoto
16:00				Attendance: 1,524

29 August 2015 No.24	Gainare Tottori	2–1 (a.e.t.)	Fagiano Okayama FC	Tottori Bank Bird Stadium, Tottori
18:00				Attendance: 2,490

30 August 2015 No.25	Grulla Morioka	0–3	FC Machida Zelvia	Iwate Athletic Stadium, Morioka
13:00				Attendance: 476

29 August 2015 No.26	Júbilo Iwata	1–0	Hokuriku University	Yamaha Stadium, Iwata, Shizuoka
18:00				Attendance: 2,240

30 August 2015 No.27	Avispa Fukuoka	3–0	Tokai University	Level-5 Stadium, Fukuoka
16:00				Attendance: 1,574

30 August 2015 No.28	Vanraure Hachinohe	0–1	Sendai University	Hachinohe East Sports Park Athletic Stadium, Hachinohe, Aomori
13:00				Attendance: 881

29 August 2015 No.29	Omiya Ardija	4–0	Tochigi Uva FC	NACK5 Stadium Omiya, Saitama
18:00				Attendance: 2,997

29 August 2015 No.30	Tokyo Verdy	5–1	Japan Soccer College	Nishigaoka Soccer Stadium, Kita, Tokyo
18:00				Attendance: 1,173

29 August 2015 No.31	Matsue City FC	1–0	Kagoshima United FC	Matsue Athletic Stadium, Matsue
13:00				Attendance: 1,124

30 August 2015 No.32	Kyoto Sanga	2–2 (a.e.t.) (5–3 p)	Ritsumeikan University	Nishikyogoku Athletic Stadium, Kyoto
18:00				Attendance: 1,668

29 August 2015 No.33	Tochigi SC	0–0 (a.e.t.) (3–4 p)	Ryutsu Keizai University	Tochigi Green Stadium, Utsunomiya
16:00				Attendance: 1,521

30 August 2015 No.34	AC Nagano Parceiro	1–0	Renofa Yamaguchi FC	Minaminagano Sports Park, Nagano, Nagano
16:00				Attendance: 2,870

29 August 2015 No.35	JEF United Ichihara Chiba	3–0	Tokyo International University	Fukuda Denshi Arena, Chiba
18:00				Attendance: 3,156

30 August 2015 No.36	FC Gifu	2–1 (a.e.t.)	Kwansei Gakuin University	Nagara Football Meadow, Gifu
13:00				Attendance: 1,152

=== Second round ===
5 September 2015 No.37	Shonan Bellmare	4–3	Toin University of Yokohama	Shonan BMW Stadium Hiratsuka, Hiratsuka, Kanagawa
18:00				Attendance: 2,266

5 September 2015 No.38	Matsumoto Yamaga FC	2–1	Zweigen Kanazawa	Matsumotodaira Football Stadium, Matsumoto, Nagano
16:03				Attendance: 6,613

5 September 2015 No.39	Oita Trinita	3–0	V-Varen Nagasaki	Ōita Bank Dome, Ōita
19:00				Attendance: 2,285

6 September 2015 No.40	Yokohama F. Marinos	3–1 (a.e.t.)	MIO Biwako Shiga	International Stadium Yokohama
19:00				Attendance: 4,024

9 September 2015 No.41	Kashima Antlers	3–1	FC Ryukyu	Kashima Soccer Stadium, Kashima, Ibaraki
19:04				Attendance: 2,069

5 September 2015 No.42	Mito HollyHock	2–1	Giravanz Kitakyushu	K's denki Stadium Mito, Mito, Ibaraki
18:00				Attendance: 1,451

5 September 2015 No.43	Ventforet Kofu	3–2	Juntendo University	Yamanashi Chuo Bank Stadium, Kōfu
15:04				Attendance: 1,995

5 September 2015 No.44	FC Osaka	2–3 (a.e.t.)	Ehime FC	Kincho Stadium, Osaka
18:00				Attendance: 1,186

5 September 2015 No.45	Sagan Tosu	4–0	Verspah Oita	Tosu Stadium, Tosu, Saga
19:00				Attendance: 3,014

5 September 2015 No.46	Consadole Sapporo	1–0	Yokohama FC	Sapporo Atsubetsu Park Stadium, Sapporo
13:00				Attendance: 2,970

9 September 2015 No.47	Albirex Niigata	4–0	Blaublitz Akita	Denka Big Swan Stadium, Niigata
19:03				Attendance: 3,365

5 September 2015 No.48	Tokushima Vortis	1–0	FC Gifu Second	Pocarisweat Stadium, Naruto, Tokushima
18:00				Attendance: 1,442

9 September 2015 No.49	Shimizu S-Pulse	2–4	Fujieda MYFC	IAI Stadium Nihondaira, Shizuoka
19:04				Attendance: 2,218

5 September 2015 No.50	Montedio Yamagata	3–1	Kamatamare Sanuki	ND Soft Stadium Yamagata, Tendō, Yamagata
19:01				Attendance: 2,834

5 September 2015 No.51	Sanfrecce Hiroshima	8–0	Hiroshima University of Economics	Fukuyama Takegahana Stadium, Fukuyama, Hiroshima
15:00				Attendance: 4,529

9 September 2015 No.52	Roasso Kumamoto	1–0	Gainare Tottori	Umakana Yokana Stadium, Kumamoto
19:00				Attendance: 1,520

9 September 2015 No.53	Nagoya Grampus	0–1	FC Machida Zelvia	Nagoya City Minato Soccer Stadium, Nagoya
19:00				Attendance: 1,481

5 September 2015 No.54	Júbilo Iwata	0–1	Avispa Fukuoka	Yamaha Stadium, Iwata, Shizuoka
18:00				Attendance: 3,368

6 September 2015 No.55	Vegalta Sendai	3–2	Sendai University	Yurtec Stadium Sendai, Sendai
15:03				Attendance: 3,351

6 September 2015 No.56	Omiya Ardija	3–1	Tokyo Verdy	NACK5 Stadium Omiya, Saitama
18:00				Attendance: 3,851

5 September 2015 No.57	Kawasaki Frontale	3–0	Matsue City FC	Todoroki Athletics Stadium, Kawasaki, Kanagawa
19:04				Attendance: 4,505

6 September 2015 No.58	Kyoto Sanga	4–0	Ryutsu Keizai University	Nishikyogoku Athletic Stadium, Kyoto
19:04				Attendance: 1,195

9 September 2015 No.59	Vissel Kobe	5–0	AC Nagano Parceiro	Kobe Universiade Memorial Stadium, Kobe
19:04				Attendance: 1,720

6 September 2015 No.60	JEF United Ichihara Chiba	1–0	FC Gifu	Fukuda Denshi Arena, Chiba
18:00				Attendance: 3,133

=== Third round ===
10 October 2015 No.61	Shonan Bellmare	2–3	Matsumoto Yamaga FC	Shonan BMW Stadium Hiratsuka, Hiratsuka, Kanagawa
14:04				Attendance: 3,646

14 October 2015 No.62	Oita Trinita	0–1 (a.e.t.)	Yokohama F. Marinos	Ōita Bank Dome, Ōita
19:00				Attendance: 2,847

14 October 2015 No.63	Kashima Antlers	0–0 (a.e.t.) (2–3 p)	Mito HollyHock	Kashima Soccer Stadium, Kashima, Ibaraki
19:00				Attendance: 4,492

14 October 2015 No.64	Ventforet Kofu	1–0	Ehime FC	Yamanashi Chuo Bank Stadium, Kōfu
19:01				Attendance: 2,056

14 October 2015 No.65	Sagan Tosu	0–0 (a.e.t.) (2–1 p)	Consadole Sapporo	Tosu Stadium, Tosu, Saga
19:04				Attendance: 2,895

14 October 2015 No.66	Albirex Niigata	1–2	Tokushima Vortis	Denka Big Swan Stadium, Denka Big Swan Stadium
19:03				Attendance: 3,499

14 October 2015 No.67	Fujieda MYFC	1–2	Montedio Yamagata	ND Soft Stadium Yamagata, Tendō, Yamagata
19:00				Attendance: 2,281

14 October 2015 No.68	Sanfrecce Hiroshima	1–0	Roasso Kumamoto	Hiroshima Big Arch, Hiroshima
19:01				Attendance: 3,179

14 October 2015 No.69	FC Machida Zelvia	2–0	Avispa Fukuoka	Level-5 Stadium, Fukuoka
19:04				Attendance: 1,611

14 October 2015 No.70	Vegalta Sendai	0–0 (a.e.t.) (4–3 p)	Omiya Ardija	Yurtec Stadium Sendai, Sendai
19:03				Attendance: 3,276

14 October 2015 No.71	Kawasaki Frontale	3–0	Kyoto Sanga	Todoroki Athletics Stadium, Kawasaki, Kanagawa
19:03				Attendance: 5,124

14 October 2015 No.72	Vissel Kobe	1–0	JEF United Ichihara Chiba	Kobe Universiade Memorial Stadium, Kobe
19:00				Attendance: 2,277

=== Fourth round ===
14 November 2015 No.73	Vissel Kobe	1–0	Yokohama F. Marinos	Misaki Park Stadium, Kobe
15:30				Attendance: 5,135

11 November 2015 No.74	FC Machida Zelvia	1–7	Urawa Red Diamonds	Kumagaya Athletic Stadium, Kumagaya, Saitama
19:00	Taira 50'		30' Hashimoto; 32' Lee; 45+2', 90+2' Sekine; 65' Abe; 69' Takagi; 75' Koroki	Attendance: 5,505; Referee: Jumpei Iida

14 November 2015 No.75	Vegalta Sendai	2–1	Matsumoto Yamaga FC	Yurtec Stadium Sendai, Sendai
13:00				Attendance: 5,802

15 November 2015 No.76	Kashiwa Reysol	2–1 (a.e.t.)	Ventforet Kofu	Hitachi Kashiwa Soccer Stadium, Kashiwa
13:00				Attendance: 4,755

15 November 2015 No.77	Kawasaki Frontale	0–2	Gamba Osaka	Osaka Expo '70 Stadium, Suita, Osaka
15:30				Attendance: 7,345

14 November 2015 No.78	Sagan Tosu	4–3	Montedio Yamagata	Tosu Stadium, Tosu, Saga
17:00				Attendance: 4,762

11 November 2015 No.79	FC Tokyo	2–0	Mito HollyHock	Ajinomoto Stadium, Chōfu, Tokyo
19:00				Attendance: 7,294; Referee: Shinji Murakami

11 November 2015 No.80	Tokushima Vortis	1–2	Sanfrecce Hiroshima	Pocarisweat Stadium, Naruto, Tokushima
19:00				Attendance: 3,154; Referee: Hiroyuki Kimura

=== Quarter-finals ===
26 December 2015 No.81	Vissel Kobe	0–3	Urawa Red Diamonds	Yanmar Stadium Nagai, Osaka
13:00			22' Koroki; 25' Lee; 44' Ugajin	Attendance: 10,488; Referee: Kenji Ogiya

26 December 2015 No.82	Vegalta Sendai	3–3 (a.e.t.) (3–5 p)	Kashiwa Reysol	Yurtec Stadium Sendai, Sendai
13:00				Attendance: 11,388; Referee: Jumpei Iida

26 December 2015 No.83	Gamba Osaka	3–1	Sagan Tosu	Osaka Expo '70 Stadium, Suita, Osaka
15:00				Attendance: 12,132; Referee: Matsuo Hajime

26 December 2015 No.84	FC Tokyo	1–2 (a.e.t.)	Sanfrecce Hiroshima	Nagasaki Athletic Stadium, Isahaya, Nagasaki
15:00				Attendance: 9,933; Referee: Minoru Tōjō

=== Semi-finals ===
29 December 2015 No.85	Urawa Red Diamonds	1–0 (a.e.t.)	Kashiwa Reysol	Ajinomoto Stadium, Chōfu, Tokyo
13:05	Lee 117'			Attendance: 22,462; Referee: Toshimitsu Yoshida

29 December 2015 No.86	Gamba Osaka	3–0	Sanfrecce Hiroshima	Yanmar Stadium Nagai, Osaka
15:05	Usami 7', 74'; Nagasawa 90+1'			Attendance: 17,027; Referee: Ryuji Sato

=== Final ===
1 January 2016 No.87	Urawa Red Diamonds	1–2	Gamba Osaka	Ajinomoto Stadium, Chōfu, Tokyo
14:16	Koroki 36'		32', 53' Patric	Attendance: 43,809; Referee: Shinji Murakami
