= 2016 All Japan Senior Football Championship =

Shakaijin Cup

Tournament details
- Country: Japan
- Dates: 22 October 2016 – 26 October 2016
- Teams: 32

Final positions
- Champions: Mitsubishi Mizushima FC (1st title)
- Runners-up: Suzuka Unlimited FC

Tournament statistics
- Matches played: 32
- Goals scored: 121 (3.78 per match)
- Top goal scorer(s): Shota Takase (Mitsubishi Mizushima; 6 goals)

The 52nd All Japan Senior Football Championship (Japanese: 第52回全国社会人サッカー選手権大会, Hepburn: Dai 52-kai zenkoku shakai hito sakkā senshuken taikai), officially the 2016 All Japan Adults Football Tournament, and most known as the 2016 Shakaijin Cup, was the 52nd edition of the annually contested single-elimination tournament (or cup) for non-league clubs.

== Calendar ==
Round	Date	Matches	Teams
Round of 32	22 October 2016	16	32 → 16
Round of 16	23 October 2016	8	16 → 8
Quarter-finals	24 October 2016	4	8 → 4
Semi-finals	25 October 2016	2	4 → 2
3rd place match	26 October 2016	1	2
Final	26 October 2016	1	2 → 1

== Schedule ==
=== Round of 32 ===
No.	Home	Score	Away
1	Veertien Mie	9–0	Hokusyukai Iwamizawa FC
2	St. Andrew's FC	1–6	Saurcos Fukui
3	Vonds Ichihara	4–0	Dezzolla Shimane
4	Sapporo FC	0–5	Iwaki FC
5	Okinawa SV	1–3	Amitie SC Kyoto
6	KUFC Nankoku	0–2	Tokyo 23 FC
7	AS Laranja Kyoto	1–2	Suzuka Unlimited FC
8	Ryutsu Keizai University FC	6–2	Miyazaki Sangyo-keiei University
9	FC Imabari	4–1	Kandai FC 2008
10	FC Kawasaki	1–6	Joyful Honda Tsukuba
11	Tegevajaro Miyazaki	0–1	FC Easy 02
12	Esperanza SC	3–1	FC Ise-Shima
13	Nippon Steel Muroran FC	0–2	Nippon Steel Oita FC
14	Matsue City FC	5–1	FC Ganju Iwate
15	Toyama Shinjo Club	0–1	Identy Mirai
16	Kochi United SC	3–4	Mitsubishi Mizushima

=== Round of 16 ===
No.	Home	Score	Away
17	Veertien Mie	1–0	Saurcos Fukui
18	Vonds Ichihara	2–4	Iwaki FC
19	Amitie SC Kyoto	3–2	Tokyo 23 FC
20	Suzuka Unlimited FC	3–0	Ryutsu Keizai University FC
21	FC Imabari	0–0 (1–4 pen.)	Joyful Honda Tsukuba FC
22	FC Easy 02	1–2	Esperanza SC
23	Nippon Steel Oita FC	1–2	Matsue City FC
24	Identy Mirai	4–0	Mitsubishi Mizushima FC

=== Quarter-finals ===
No.	Home	Score	Away
25	Veertien Mie	2–0	Iwaki FC
26	Ococias Kyoto	1–2	Suzuka Unlimited FC
27	Joyful Honda Tsukuba FC	3–1	Esperanza SC
28	Matsue City FC	0–1	Mitsubishi Mizushima FC

=== Semi-finals ===
No.	Home	Score	Away
29	Veertien Mie	1–2	Suzuka Unlimited FC
30	Joyful Honda Tsukuba	0–2	Mitsubishi Mizushima FC

=== Third place match ===
No.	Home	Score	Away
31	Veertien Mie	2–1	Joyful Honda Tsukuba FC

=== Final ===
No.	Home	Score	Away
32	Suzuka Unlimited FC	2–2 (3–5 pen.)	Mitsubishi Mizushima FC

== See also ==
- 2016 J1 League
- 2016 J2 League
- 2016 J3 League
- 2016 Japanese Regional Leagues
- 2016 Emperor's Cup
- 2016 J.League Cup
