= 2010 Japanese Regional Leagues =

Japanese amateur leagues football season

Japanese Regional Leagues
- Season: 2010

Statistics of Japanese Regional Leagues for the 2010 season.

== Champions list ==
Region	Champions
Hokkaido	Sapporo University GP
Tohoku	Grulla Morioka
Kantō	YSCC Yokohama
Hokushin'etsu	Nagano Parceiro
Tōkai	Fujieda MYFC
Kansai	Sanyō Electric Sumoto S.C
Chūgoku	Renofa Yamaguchi
Shikoku	Kamatamare Sanuki
Kyushu	HOYO Atletico ELAN

== Hokkaido ==
2010 Hokkaido League teams

2010 was the 33rd season of Hokkaido League. The season started on May 16 and ended on September 19.

It was contested by six teams and Sapporo University GP won the tournament for the second consecutive year.

After the season, Blackpecker Hakodate and Sapporo Winds were to be relegated to the Block Leagues, however, finally only Sapporo Winds was relegated because the number of teams was expanded to 8 from 2011 season.

=== League table ===
Pos	Team	Pld	W	D	L	GF	GA	GD	Pts	Qualification or relegation
1	Sapporo University GP (C)	10	8	1	1	37	8	+29	25	Qualified for 2010 Japanese Regional Football League Competition
2	Norbritz Hokkaido	10	7	2	1	67	6	+61	23	
3	Sapporo FC	10	5	2	3	19	18	+1	17	
4	Maruseizu FC	10	5	1	4	17	23	−6	16	
5	Blackpecker Hakodate (R)	10	1	0	9	7	49	−42	3	
6	Sapporo Winds (R)	10	1	0	9	6	49	−43	3	Relegation to Hokkaido Block leagues

Updated to match(es) played on September 19, 2010. Source: RSSSF
Rules for classification: 1) points; 2) goal difference; 3) number of goals scored.
(C) Champions; (R) Relegated

=== Results ===
Home \ Away	BLP	MRS	NOR	SAP	SGP	WIN
Blackpecker Hakodate		0–1	0–12	0–3	2–6	1–2
Maruseizu FC	6–0		0–5	1–1	2–3	2–1
Norbritz Hokkaido	7–0	7–0		11–1	0–3	17–0
Sapporo FC	5–1	1–2	0–0		1–2	2–1
Sapporo University GP	6–0	4–0	2–2	0–1		3–0
Sapporo Winds	1–3	1–3	0–6	0–4	0–8	

Updated to match(es) played on September 19, 2010. Source: RSSSF
Legend: Blue = home team win; Yellow = draw; Red = away team win.

== Tohoku ==
2010 Tohoku League D1 teams

=== Division 1 ===
2010 was the 34th season of Tohoku League. The season started on April 11 and ended on October 17.

It was contested by eight teams and Grulla Morioka won the championship for the fourth consecutive year. In the repetition of the previous season, they outstripped Fukushima United only by the goal difference.

Cobaltore Onagawa were relegated and Division 2 play-off winner Fuji Club 2003 took their place.

==== League table ====
Pos	Team	Pld	W	D	L	GF	GA	GD	Pts	Qualification or relegation
1	Grulla Morioka (C, Q)	14	12	1	1	57	11	+46	37	Qualified for 2010 Japanese Regional Football League Competition (Note: Fukushima United qualified to Promotional Series by means of their results in Shakaijin Cup.)
2	Fukushima United (Q)	14	12	1	1	46	9	+37	37	Qualified for 2010 Japanese Regional Football League Competition
3	NEC Tokin	14	8	2	4	43	21	+22	26	
4	Morioka Zebra	14	4	2	8	17	29	−12	14	
5	Akita Cambiare	14	3	4	7	26	33	−7	13	
6	FC Primero	14	3	4	7	15	30	−15	13	
7	Shiogama Wiese	14	3	1	10	10	65	−55	10	Promotion/relegation Series
8	Cobaltore Onagawa (R)	14	1	5	8	13	29	−16	8	Relegation to Tohoku League Division 2

Updated to match(es) played on October 3, 2010. Source: Tohoku Soccer League
Rules for classification: 1) points; 2) goal difference; 3) number of goals scored.
(C) Champions; (Q) Qualified for the phase indicated; (R) Relegated

==== Results ====
Home \ Away	CAM	COB	FUK	GRU	NEC	PRM	WIE	ZEB
Akita Cambiare		0–1	0–2	1–3	0–7	2–2	8–0	2–3
Cobaltore Onagawa	1–1		1–2	0–2	0–5	2–3	1–1	0–2
Fukushima United	4–0	2–2		2–1	4–1	3–0	9–0	4–1
Grulla Morioka	2–2	5–1	2–1		4–0	5–1	5–0	6–0
NEC Tokin	3–3	2–1	0–2	1–3		1–1	7–0	3–2
FC Primero	0–1	1–1	1–2	0–4	0–6		3–0	1–0
Shiogama Wiese	2–4	2–1	0–5	2–13	0–5	2–1		1–0
Morioka Zebra	3–2	1–1	0–4	0–2	1–2	1–1	3–0	

Updated to match(es) played on October 3, 2010. Source: First round, Second round
Legend: Blue = home team win; Yellow = draw; Red = away team win.

=== Division 2 ===
2010 was the 14th season of Tohoku League Division 2. North and South groups were won by Fuji Club 2003 and Scheinen Fukushima respectively, and in post-season playoff series the former earned promotion to Division 1.

2010 Tohoku Division 2 North League teams

==== North league table ====
Pos	Team	Pld	W	D	L	GF	GA	GD	Pts	Qualification or relegation
1	Fuji Club 2003 (C, P)	14	12	1	1	43	8	+35	37	Qualification for Tohoku promotion/relegation Series
2	Vanraure Hachinohe	14	12	0	2	52	10	+42	36	
3	Omiya FC	14	8	1	5	39	22	+17	25	
4	Tono Club	14	6	2	6	29	31	−2	20	
5	Mizusawa SC	14	6	1	7	29	36	−7	19	
6	Nippon Steel Kamaishi	14	3	3	8	30	32	−2	12	
7	ReinMeer Aomori	14	3	1	10	25	48	−23	10	Prefectural promotion/relegation Series
8	FC Shiwa (R)	14	1	1	12	17	77	−60	4	Relegation to Iwate Prefectural League

Updated to match(es) played on October 17, 2010. Source: Tohoku Soccer League
Rules for classification: 1) points; 2) goal difference; 3) number of goals scored.
(C) Champions; (P) Promoted; (R) Relegated

==== North league results ====
Home \ Away	FJI	MIZ	NSK	OMI	REI	SHW	TNO	VAN
Fuji Club 2003		6–0	1–0	5–0	3–0	5–0	3–1	5–1
Mizusawa SC	1–0		1–1	1–4	9–2	4–0	1–2	0–2
Nippon Steel Kamaishi	2–4	2–3		3–5	7–1	6–1	1–1	1–5
Omiya	1–1	2–3	2–0		2–1	12–0	5–1	0–2
ReinMeer Aomori	0–1	2–4	4–2	1–2		4–0	1–3	0–6
FC Shiwa	1–3	3–0	3–3	2–4	2–5		2–8	2–14
Tono Club	1–5	3–2	0–2	1–0	3–3	5–1		0–3
Vanraure Hachinohe	0–1	7–0	1–0	1–0	4–1	4–0	2–0	

Updated to match(es) played on October 17, 2010. Source: First round, Second round
Legend: Blue = home team win; Yellow = draw; Red = away team win.
2010 Tohoku Division 2 South League teams

==== South league table ====
Pos	Team	Pld	W	D	L	GF	GA	GD	Pts	Qualification or relegation
1	Scheinen Fukushima (C)	14	10	2	2	35	21	+14	32	Qualification for Tohoku promotion/relegation Series
2	Sendai Nakada	14	10	1	3	37	19	+18	31	
3	Bandits Iwaki	14	9	0	5	41	16	+25	27	
4	Merry	14	6	2	6	32	29	+3	20	
5	Iwaki Furukawa	14	5	3	6	24	33	−9	18	
6	Marysol Matsushima	14	6	0	8	25	36	−11	18	
7	Viancone Fukushima	14	4	2	8	21	31	−10	14	Prefectural promotion/relegation Series
8	Soma SC (R)	14	1	0	13	10	40	−30	3	Relegation to Miyagi Prefectural League

Updated to match(es) played on October 3, 2010. Source: Tohoku Soccer League
Rules for classification: 1) points; 2) goal difference; 3) number of goals scored.
(C) Champions; (R) Relegated

==== South league results ====
Home \ Away	BAN	NAK	IFU	MAR	MER	SCH	SOM	VIA
Bandits Iwaki		1–2	2–0	2–3	2–5	1–3	3–0	8–1
Sendai Nakada	1–3		4–0	5–2	3–2	3–1	5–1	1–3
Iwaki Furukawa	0–6	2–4		3–1	1–1	2–3	2–1	3–2
Marysol Matsushima	0–7	0–1	1–3		2–1	1–4	3–2	4–0
Merry	0–3	3–1	4–2	1–4		4–1	3–2	1–3
Scheinen Fukushima	1–0	1–1	3–3	2–1	4–2		2–1	4–2
Soma SC	0–2	0–3	0–2	1–3	0–4	0–4		2–1
Viancone Fukushima	0–1	0–3	1–1	4–0	1–1	0–2	3–0	

Updated to match(es) played on October 3, 2010. Source: First round, Second round
Legend: Blue = home team win; Yellow = draw; Red = away team win.

=== Tohoku promotion and relegation series ===
To decide the promotion between the two divisions, the Division 2 winners played against each other in a two-legged series. Fuji Club 2003 defeated Scheinen Fukushima and gained direct promotion to Division 1, replacing the bottom-placed Cobaltore Onagawa, while Scheinen Fukushima faced the seventh placed team in Division 1 Shiogama Wiese in another two-legged series. Shiogama Wiese won the series 6–4 on aggregate (winning 5–1 away and losing 2–3 at home) and they remained in Division 1.

== Kantō ==
=== Division 1 ===
2010 Kanto League D1 teams

2010 was the 44th season of Kanto League. The season started on April 4 and ended on August 1.

It was contested by eight teams. YSCC Yokohama won the championship for the second consecutive year (third title overall).

After the season, Club Dragons and AC Almaleza were relegated to the second division. Because of the relegation of Ryutsu Keizai University from Japan Football League, only the champions of Division 2, Toho Titanium, were promoted.

==== League table ====
Pos	Team	Pld	W	D	L	GF	GA	GD	Pts	Qualification or relegation
1	YSCC Yokohama (C, Q)	14	11	0	3	51	17	+34	33	Qualified for 2010 Japanese Regional Football League Competition (Note: Saitama S.C. were given a spot in the promotion series by JFL since only one team qualified from Shakaijin Cup.)
2	Saitama SC (Q)	14	7	2	5	26	17	+9	23	Qualified for 2010 Japanese Regional Football League Competition
3	FC Korea	14	7	1	6	25	20	+5	22	
4	Vertfee Takahara Nasu	14	6	2	6	20	20	0	20	
5	Tonan Maebashi	14	6	2	6	22	23	−1	20	
6	Atsugi Marcus	14	5	3	6	16	23	−7	18	
7	Club Dragons (R)	14	5	2	7	15	29	−14	17	Relegation to Kanto League Division 2
8	AC Almaleza (R)	14	3	0	11	17	43	−26	9	Relegation to Kanto League Division 2

Updated to match(es) played on August 1, 2010. Source: RSSSF
(C) Champions; (Q) Qualified for the phase indicated; (R) Relegated

==== Results ====
Home \ Away	ALM	DRA	KOR	MRC	SAI	TON	VRF	YSC
AC Almaleza		1–3	1–3	0–1	3–2	1–2	1–5	2–6
Club Dragons	3–2		2–0	0–2	0–4	1–5	3–2	0–3
FC Korea	3–1	2–0		3–0	1–2	2–1	0–3	2–3
Atsugi Marcus	1–2	1–1	2–1		1–0	1–1	3–0	1–4
Saitama SC	2–0	4–0	1–1	1–0		0–1	0–0	3–1
Tonan Maebashi	1–3	1–2	3–4	1–1	2–1		0–1	2–0
Vertfee Takahara Nasu	3–0	0–0	0–3	3–0	2–3	0–1		1–0
YSCC Yokohama	8–0	2–0	1–0	6–2	5–3	6–1	6–0	

Updated to match(es) played on August 1, 2010. Source: RSSSF
Legend: Blue = home team win; Yellow = draw; Red = away team win.
2010 Kanto League D2 teams

=== Division 2 ===
2010 was the 8th season of Kanto League Division 2. It was won by Toho Titanium who earned promotion to Division 1. On the other end of the table, Honda Luminozo Sayama were relegated to prefectural leagues.

==== League table ====
Pos	Team	Pld	W	D	L	GF	GA	GD	Pts	Promotion or relegation
1	Toho Titanium (C, P)	14	7	4	3	33	20	+13	25	Promotion to Kanto League Division 1
2	Kanagawa Teachers	14	5	5	4	27	25	+2	20	
3	TM & NF Insurance	14	5	5	4	21	20	+1	20	
4	Hitachi Building System	14	6	1	7	20	25	−5	19	
5	Aries Tokyo	14	5	3	6	22	18	+4	18	
6	SG System	14	6	0	8	27	24	+3	18	
7	SAI Ichihara	14	5	3	6	21	27	−6	18	
8	Honda Luminozo Sayama (R)	14	5	3	6	20	32	−12	18	Relegation to Saitama Prefectural League

Updated to match(es) played on August 1, 2010. Source: Kanto Soccer League
Rules for classification: 1) points; 2) goal difference; 3) number of goals scored.
(C) Champions; (P) Promoted; (R) Relegated

==== Results ====
Home \ Away	ARI	BUI	ICH	KTE	LUM	SGS	TIT	TNI
Aries Tokyo		4–0	0–1	1–2	1–2	3–0	1–1	1–2
Hitachi Building System	0–1		6–2	1–1	1–2	2–1	0–5	1–0
SAI Ichihara	1–2	1–0		4–3	1–2	0–2	0–3	1–1
Kanagawa Teachers	3–1	3–2	1–1		1–1	4–3	1–2	1–3
Honda Luminozo Sayama	4–3	0–2	2–2	0–2		3–2	1–2	0–3
SG System	0–2	0–1	3–1	2–1	5–0		3–4	1–2
Toho Titanium	2–2	5–2	1–2	2–2	4–0	0–3		1–1
TM & NF Insurance	0–0	0–2	1–4	2–2	3–3	1–2	2–1	

Updated to match(es) played on August 1, 2010. Source: Kanto Soccer League
Legend: Blue = home team win; Yellow = draw; Red = away team win.

== Hokushin'etsu ==
=== Division 1 ===
2010 Hokushin'etsu League D1 teams

2010 was the 36th season of Hokushin'etsu League. The season started on April 11 and ended on September 19.

It was contested by eight teams and Nagano Parceiro won the championship for the third time in their history after one-year pause. After the season they won the promotion to Japan Football League.

Because of Parceiro being promoted to JFL, only Antelope Shiojiri were relegated. They were replaced by Division 2 champions and runners-up, Artista Tomi and Fukui KSC respectively.

==== League table ====
Pos	Team	Pld	W	D	L	GF	GA	GD	Pts	Qualification or relegation
1	Nagano Parceiro (C, P)	14	12	2	0	68	4	+64	38	Qualified for 2010 Japanese Regional Football League Competition
2	Japan Soccer College	14	11	2	1	50	12	+38	35	
3	Ueda Gentian	14	7	0	7	18	35	−17	21	
4	Granscena Niigata	14	5	2	7	24	33	−9	17	
5	Saurcos Fukui	14	5	1	8	18	43	−25	16	
6	Teihens FC	14	5	0	9	18	38	−20	15	
7	Valiente Toyama	14	3	2	9	13	27	−14	11	
8	Antelope Shiojiri (R)	14	2	3	9	15	32	−17	9	Relegation to Hokushin'etsu League Division 2

Updated to match(es) played on September 19, 2010. Source: RSSSF
Rules for classification: 1) points; 2) goal difference; 3) number of goals scored.
(C) Champions; (P) Promoted; (R) Relegated

==== Results ====
Home \ Away	ANL	GEN	GRS	JSC	PAR	SAU	TEI	VAT
Antelope Shiojiri		1–2	0–3	1–3	0–3	1–1	2–1	0–3
Ueda Gentian	1–7		1–3	1–4	0–4	2–0	1–0	2–0
Granscena Niigata	1–1	2–4		1–3	0–4	4–1	0–1	3–2
Japan Soccer College	3–1	6–0	0–0		2–3	6–0	3–2	2–0
Nagano Parceiro	8–0	5–0	9–0	1–1		8–0	6–0	6–0
Saurcos Fukui	1–0	1–2	4–1	1–7	0–8		5–2	1–0
Teihens FC	1–0	2–1	1–5	1–8	0–2	2–1		4–1
Valiente Toyama	1–1	0–1	2–1	0–2	1–1	0–2	3–1	

Updated to match(es) played on September 19, 2010. Source: First round, Second round
Legend: Blue = home team win; Yellow = draw; Red = away team win.

=== Division 2 ===
2010 Hokushin'etsu League D2 teams

2010 was the 7th season of Hokushin'etsu League Division 2. It was won by the rookies Artista Tomi who thus have won back-to-back promotion along with the runners-up Fukui KSC.

Because only one team was relegated from Division 1, only the bottom placed Ohara Gakuen HS were relegated to Prefectural leagues. They were replaced by Toyama Shinjo Club and AS Jamineiro.

==== League table ====
Pos	Team	Pld	W	D	L	GF	GA	GD	Pts	Promotion or relegation
1	Artista Tomi (C, P)	14	10	3	1	44	15	+29	33	Promotion to Hokushin'etsu League Division 1
2	Fukui KSC (P)	14	8	3	3	26	25	+1	27	Promotion to Hokushin'etsu League Division 1
3	CUPS Seiro	14	7	3	4	34	19	+15	24	
4	Niigata Uni. of H&W	14	6	2	6	30	22	+8	20	
5	Niigata Uni. of Management	14	4	5	5	16	21	−5	17	
6	Goals FC	14	2	8	4	18	22	−4	14	
7	Maruoka Phoenix	14	3	2	9	11	25	−14	11	
8	Ohara Gakuen HS (R)	14	1	4	9	7	37	−30	7	Relegation to Nagano Prefectural League

Updated to match(es) played on September 19, 2010. Source: RSSSF
Rules for classification: 1) points; 2) goal difference; 3) number of goals scored.
(C) Champions; (P) Promoted; (R) Relegated

==== Results ====
Home \ Away	ARS	CUP	GOA	KSC	NHW	NUM	OHG	PHX
Artista Tomi		2–1	2–2	7–1	5–2	1–1	11–0	1–0
CUPS Seiro	2–3		1–1	4–0	3–1	1–3	3–0	3–0
Goals FC	0–1	1–5		2–2	1–3	2–2	4–0	2–1
Fukui KSC	2–2	4–2	3–1		2–1	3–0	1–1	0–1
Niigata Uni. of H&W	3–2	1–1	0–0	1–2		3–0	5–1	1–2
Niigata Uni. of Management	0–2	3–4	0–0	0–1	3–2		1–0	1–0
Ohara Gakuen HS	0–1	0–0	1–1	1–2	0–5	1–1		1–0
Maruoka Phoenix	1–4	0–4	1–1	2–3	0–2	1–1	2–1	

Updated to match(es) played on September 19, 2010. Source: RSSSF
Legend: Blue = home team win; Yellow = draw; Red = away team win.

== Tōkai ==
=== Division 1 ===
Pos	Team	Pld	W	D	L	GF	GA	GD	Pts	Qualification or relegation
1	Fujieda MYFC (C)	16	12	3	1	49	8	+41	39	Qualified for 2010 Japanese Regional Football League Competition
2	F.C. Kariya	16	10	5	1	38	9	+29	35	
3	Maruyasu Industries S.C.	16	9	1	6	29	22	+7	28	
4	F.C. Suzuka Rampole	16	7	6	3	24	15	+9	27	
5	Fujieda City Hall S.C.	16	7	3	6	21	19	+2	24	
6	Yazaki Valente	16	4	5	7	16	21	−5	17	
7	Hamamatsu University F.C. (R)	16	4	1	11	25	51	−26	13	Relegation to Tokai League Division 2
8	Chukyo University F.C. (R)	16	3	2	11	21	29	−8	11	Relegation to Tokai League Division 2
9	Fuyō Club (R)	16	2	2	12	8	57	−49	8	Relegation to Tokai League Division 2

Source: RSSSF
Rules for classification: 1) points; 2) goal difference; 3) number of goals scored.
(C) Champions; (R) Relegated

=== Division 2 ===
Pos	Team	Pld	W	D	L	GF	GA	GD	Pts	Promotion or relegation
1	F.C. Gifu Second (C, P)	14	10	2	2	38	10	+28	32	Promotion to Tokai League Division 1
2	Toyota Shūkyūdan (P)	14	7	4	3	28	17	+11	25	Promotion to Tokai League Division 1
3	Chukyo University	14	7	2	5	26	24	+2	23	
4	Kasugai Club	14	7	2	5	19	19	0	23	
5	Konica Minolta S.C. Toyokawa	14	6	4	4	22	17	+5	22	
6	ISE YAMATO FC	14	4	6	4	16	19	−3	18	
7	Mind House Yokkaichi (R)	14	2	1	11	12	33	−21	7	Relegation to Prefectural League
8	KMEW Iga FC (R)	14	2	1	11	18	40	−22	7	Relegation to Prefectural League

Source: RSSSF
Rules for classification: 1) points; 2) goal difference; 3) number of goals scored.
(C) Champions; (P) Promoted; (R) Relegated

== Kansai ==
=== Division 1 ===
Pos	Team	Pld	W	D	L	GF	GA	GD	Pts	Qualification or relegation
1	Sanyō Electric Sumoto S.C. (C)	14	10	2	2	37	12	+25	32	Qualified for 2010 Japanese Regional Football League Competition
2	Ain Foods S.C.	14	9	3	2	30	12	+18	30	
3	Hannan University F.C.	14	7	4	3	34	19	+15	25	
4	Nara Club	14	6	6	2	36	24	+12	24	
5	AS.Laranja Kyoto	14	6	2	6	26	22	+4	20	
6	Banditonce Kakogawa	14	5	3	6	22	16	+6	18	
7	Biwako S.C. Hira (R)	14	2	0	12	15	47	−32	6	Relegation to Division 2
8	Renaiss Koga S.C. (R)	14	1	0	13	14	62	−48	3	Relegation to Division 2

Source: RSSSF
Rules for classification: 1) points; 2) goal difference; 3) number of goals scored.
(C) Champions; (R) Relegated

=== Division 2 ===
Pos	Team	Pld	W	D	L	GF	GA	GD	Pts	Promotion or relegation
1	Tojitsu Shiga F.C.	14	10	2	2	46	16	+30	32	Promotion to Kansai League Division 1
2	Amitie SC F.C.	14	9	3	2	56	12	+44	30	Promotion to Kansai League Division 1
3	Diablossa Takada F.C.	14	9	3	2	46	22	+24	30	
4	Kwangaku Club	14	7	1	6	21	23	−2	22	
5	Kyoto Shiko Club	14	5	3	6	17	29	−12	18	
6	Kobe F.C. 1970	14	3	1	10	13	46	−33	10	
7	Mitsubishi Heavy Industries Kobe S.C.	14	2	3	9	12	41	−29	9	
8	Technonet Osaka	14	2	2	10	16	38	−22	8	

Source: RSSSF
Rules for classification: 1) points; 2) goal difference; 3) number of goals scored.

== Chūgoku ==
Pos	Team	Pld	W	D	L	GF	GA	GD	Pts	Qualification or relegation
1	Renofa Yamaguchi (C, Q)	18	14	1	3	51	17	+34	43	Qualified for 2010 Japanese Regional Football League Competition
2	Dezzolla Shimane	18	13	1	4	60	31	+29	40	
3	Volador Matsue	18	11	2	5	50	36	+14	35	
4	Fagiano Okayama Next	18	11	1	6	65	25	+40	34	
5	NTN Okayama S.C.	18	9	0	9	48	43	+5	27	
6	Sagawa Express Chūgoku	18	9	0	9	44	40	+4	27	
7	JX Mizushima	18	8	2	8	44	41	+3	26	
8	F.C. Ube Yahhh-man	18	6	1	11	33	38	−5	19	
9	Hitachi Kasado S.C.	18	5	0	13	31	77	−46	15	
10	JFE Steel Nishinihon S.C.	18	0	0	18	9	87	−78	0	

Source: RSSSF
Rules for classification: 1) points; 2) goal difference; 3) number of goals scored.
(C) Champions; (Q) Qualified for the phase indicated

== Shikoku ==
Pos	Team	Pld	W	D	L	GF	GA	GD	Pts	Qualification
1	Kamatamare Sanuki (C, P)	14	12	2	0	53	5	+48	38	Qualified for 2010 Japanese Regional Football League Competition
2	Tokushima Vortis Second	14	11	1	2	47	10	+37	34	
3	Ehime F.C. Shimanani	14	8	3	3	34	12	+22	27	
4	Nangoku Kōchi	14	5	4	5	24	27	−3	19	
5	Sanyō Electric Tokushima S.C.	14	3	5	6	14	29	−15	14	
6	R.Velho	14	3	1	10	11	39	−28	10	
7	Kuroshio F.C.	14	2	3	9	7	33	−26	9	
8	Minami Club	14	2	1	11	11	46	−35	7	Shikoku promotion/relegation play-off

Source: RSSSF
Rules for classification: 1) points; 2) goal difference; 3) number of goals scored.
(C) Champions; (P) Promoted

== Kyushu ==
Pos	Team	Pld	W	PKW	PKL	L	GF	GA	GD	Pts	Result
1	HOYO Atletico ELAN (C, Q)	16	13	2	1	0	48	8	+40	44	Qualified for 2010 Japanese Regional Football League Competition
2	Volca Kagoshima	16	12	1	0	3	52	18	+34	38	
3	Nippon Steel Corp. Oita S.C.	16	8	2	1	5	43	26	+17	29	
4	Kyushu Sogo Sports College F.C.	16	5	2	2	7	30	41	−11	21	
5	Kyushu Inax F.C.	16	4	3	2	7	25	31	−6	20	
6	Mitsubishi Heavy Industrial Nagasaki S.C.	16	5	0	3	8	27	39	−12	18	
7	MSU FC	16	3	3	1	9	30	56	−26	16	
8	Kawazoe Club	16	3	2	2	9	25	39	−14	15	
9	Okinawa Kaihō Bank S.C.	16	4	0	3	9	16	38	−22	15	Kyushu promotion/relegation play-off

Source: RSSSF
Rules for classification: 1) points; 2) goal difference; 3) number of goals scored.
(C) Champion; (Q) Qualified to the phase indicated
