= Koya Tanio =

Japanese footballer

Koya Tanio 谷尾昂也
Personal information
- Full name: Koya Tanio
- Date of birth: May 29, 1992 (age 34)
- Place of birth: Kawahara, Tottori, Japan
- Height: 1.78 m (5 ft 10 in)
- Position: Forward

Team information
- Current team: Vanraure Hachinohe
- Number: 18

Youth career
- 2008–2010: Shiritsuyonagokitako School

Senior career*
Years	Team	Apps	(Gls)
2011–2013	Kawasaki Frontale	0	(0)
2013	→ Gainare Tottori (loan)	2	(0)
2014	Gainare Tottori	11	(0)
2014	→ Vonds Ichihara (loan)	7	(1)
2015	Matsue City FC	18	(12)
2016	Saurcos Fukui	10	(6)
2017–	Vanraure Hachinohe	79	(22)
- * Club domestic league appearances and goals as of 20 February 2020

Koya Tanio (谷尾 昂也, Tanio Kōya; born May 29, 1992) is a Japanese football player. He plays for Vanraure Hachinohe.

== Playing career ==
Koya Tanio joined to Kawasaki Frontale in 2011. In August 2013, he moved to Gainare Tottori. In July 2014, he moved to Vonds Ichihara. From 2015, he played for Matsue City FC (2015), Saurcos Fukui (2016-).

== Club statistics ==
Updated to 5 April 2020.

Club performance			League		Cup		League Cup		Total	
Season	Club	League	Apps	Goals	Apps	Goals	Apps	Goals	Apps	Goals
Japan			League		Emperor's Cup		J. League Cup		Total	
2011	Kawasaki Frontale	J1 League	0	0	0	0	0	0	0	0
2012	Kawasaki Frontale	J1 League	0	0	0	0	0	0	0	0
2013	Kawasaki Frontale	J1 League	0	0	–		0	0	0	0
2013	Gainare Tottori	J2 League	2	0	1	0	–		3	0
2014	Gainare Tottori	J3 League	11	0	0	0	–		11	0
2014	Vonds Ichihara	JRL (Kantō)	7	1	–		–		7	1
2015	Matsue City FC	JRL (Chūgoku)	18	12	2	1	–		20	13
2016	Saurcos Fukui	JRL (Hokushinetsu)	10	6	1	0	–		11	6
2017	Vanraure Hachinohe	JFL	21	4	3	0	–		24	4
2017	Vanraure Hachinohe	JFL	24	10	–		–		24	10
2019	Vanraure Hachinohe	J3 League	34	8	3	0	–		37	8
Total			127	41	10	1	0	0	137	42
