= 2013 All Japan Senior Football Championship =

Shakaijin Cup

Tournament details
- Country: Japan
- City: Shimabara and Unzen Nagasaki
- Dates: 19–23 September 2013
- Teams: 32

Final positions
- Champions: Renofa Yamaguchi FC (1st title)
- Runners-up: Grulla Morioka

Tournament statistics
- Matches played: 32

The 49th All Japan Senior Football Championship (Japanese: 第49回全国社会人サッカー選手権大会, Hepburn: Dai 49-kai zenkoku shakai hito sakkā senshuken taikai), officially the 2013 All Japan Adults Football Tournament, and most known as the 2013 Shakaijin Cup, was the 49th edition of the annually contested single-elimination tournament (or cup) for non-league clubs. The competition was held in Shimabara and Unzen in Nagasaki Prefecture.

== Tournament rules ==
- The tournament followed a knockout format with 32 teams.
  - Teams were chosen through a qualifying round across nine regions, with one team from each region.
  - In FY2012, twenty-two teams were allocated based on the number of company-wide registrations in each region. Additionally,
  - One team represented the host prefecture.
- Matches consisted of two 40-minute halves, and if drawn, then two 10-minute extra-time halves were played, followed by a penalty shootout if necessary.
- The top three teams earned spots in the 37th National Regional Soccer League Finals, but if any had already qualified as regional league representatives, the fourth-place team would take their spot.

== Calendar ==
Round	Date	Matches	Teams
Round of 32	19 October 2013	16	32 → 16
Round of 16	20 October 2013	8	16 → 8
Quarter-finals	21 October 2013	4	8 → 4
Semi-finals	22 October 2013	2	4 → 2
3rd place match	23 October 2013	1	2
Final	23 October 2013	1	2 → 1

== Participating teams ==
Bold is a team that has already qualified for the regional finals by winning the regional league

- Hokkaido - 3 teams
  - Sapporo Kick Team (Hokkaido)
  - Rokkatei Marseilles FC (Hokkaido)
  - Toyota Motor Hokkaido Soccer Club (Hokkaido)
- Tohoku - 2 teams
  - Vanraure Hachinohe (Tohoku 1st Division)
  - Grulla Morioka (Tohoku 1st Division)
- Kantō - 6 teams
  - Urayasu SC (Kantō 2nd Division)
  - Vertfee Yaita (Kantō 1st Division)
  - Tonan Maebashi (Kantō 1st Division)
  - Joyful Honda Tsukuba (Ibaraki Prefecture 1st Division)
  - Chiba Teacher SC (Chiba Prefecture 1st Division)
  - VONDS Ichihara (Kantō 2nd Division)
- Hokushin'etsu - 2 teams
  - Saulcos Fukui (Hokushin'etsu 1st Division)
  - FC Hokuriku (Hokushin'etsu 1st Division)
- Tokai - 4 teams
  - Fujieda City Hall Soccer Club (Tokai 1st Division)
  - FC Gifu SECOND (Tokai 1st Division)
  - Yazaki Valente FC (ja) (Tokai 1st Division)
  - Toyota Kick Team (Tokai 1st division)
- Kansai - 5 teams
  - FC Osaka (Kansai 1st Division)
  - Amitie SC (Kansai 1st Division)
  - Lagend Shiga FC (Kansai 1st Division)
  - Banditonce Kakogawa (Kansai 1st Division)
  - Kansai University FC 2008 (Kansai 2nd Division)
- Chugoku - 3 teams
  - Dezzolla Shimane (Chugoku)
  - Fagiano Okayama Next (Chugoku)
  - Renofa Yamaguchi (Chugoku)
- Shikoku - 2 teams
  - Kochi U Torastar FC (Shikoku)
  - FC Imabari (Shikoku)
- Kyushu - 4 teams
  - Volca Kagoshima (Kyushu)
  - FC Kagoshima (Kyushu)
  - Nippon Steel Oita SC (ja) (Kyushu)
  - MHI Nagasaki SC (ja) (Kyushu)
- Venue (Nagasaki) - 1 team
  - Tokitsu SC (Nagasaki Prefecture 1st Division)

== Schedule ==
=== Round of 32 ===
No.	Home	Score	Away
1	Fagiano Okayama Next	1–2	Lagend Shiga
2	Toyota Motors Hokkaido FC	0–13	Iwate Grulla Morioka
3	Vonds Ichihara	2–1	FC Imabari
4	Saurcos Fukui	5–1	Sapporo FC
5	Joyful Honda Tsukuba	1–0	Mitsubishi Nagasaki SC
6	Yazaki Valente FC	1–7	Kandai FC 2008
7	Vertfee Takahara Nasu	0–1	FC Osaka
8	FC Kagoshima	3–2	Fujieda City Hall SC
9	Togitsu SC	0–10	Urayasu SC
10	Toyota SC	1–3	Amitie SC
11	FC Hokuriku	1–2	Nippon Steel Oita FC
12	Renofa Yamaguchi FC	3–2	Tonan Maebashi
13	Chiba Teachers SC	1–0	Rokkatei Maruseizu
14	FC Gifu SECOND	3–0	Kochi U Torastar FC
15	Vanraure Hachinohe	1–0	Dezzolla Shimane
16	Volca Kagoshima	2–0	Banditonce Kakogawa

=== Round of 16 ===
No.	Home	Score	Away
17	Lagend Shiga	0–3	Grulla Morioka
18	Vonds Ichihara	1–2	Saurcos Fukui
19	Joyful Honda Tsukuba	3–2	Kandai FC 2008
20	FC Osaka	1–0	FC Kagoshima
21	Urayasu SC	2–0	Amitie SC
22	Nippon Steel Oita FC	1–3	Renofa Yamaguchi FC
23	Chiba Teachers FC	1–3	FC Gifu SECOND
24	Vanraure Hachinohe	0–1	Volca Kagoshima

=== Quarter-finals ===
No.	Home	Score	Away
25	Grulla Morioka	1–0	Saurcos Fukui
26	Joyful Honda Tsukuba FC	1–0	FC Osaka
27	Urayasu SC	0–1	Renofa Yamaguchi FC
28	FC Gifu SECOND	3–2	Volca Kagoshima

=== Semi-finals ===
No.	Home	Score	Away
29	Iwate Grulla Morioka	2–1	Joyful Honda Tsukuba
30	Renofa Yamaguchi FC	2–0	FC Gifu SECOND

=== Third place match ===
No.	Home	Score	Away
31	Joyful Honda Tsukuba FC	1–3	FC Gifu SECOND

=== Final ===
No.	Home	Score	Away
32	Iwate Grulla Morioka	1–1 (4–5 pen.)	Renofa Yamaguchi FC

== Final result ==
- Winner: Renofa Yamaguchi - Qualified for the 37th Regional Finals
- Runner-up: Grulla Morioka - Won the regional league and qualified for the 37th regional finals
- 3rd place: FC Gifu SECOND - Withdrawn from the 37th regional finals
- 4th place: Joyful Honda Tsukuba FC - Qualified for the 37th regional finals

As a result of the above results, Consequently, two clubs advanced to the regional finals from this tournament, FC Kagoshima, who were runner's up in the Kyushu League, has won the right to participate in the regional finals ahead of schedule due to the tournament regulations of the regional finals.

== See also ==
- 2013 J.League Division 1
- 2013 J.League Division 2
- 2013 Japan Football League
- 2013 Japanese Regional Leagues
- 2013 Emperor's Cup
- 2013 J.League Cup
