= Mila Martínez =

Spanish football manager

Personal information
- Full name: Milagros Martínez Domínguez
- Date of birth: 23 April 1985 (age 41)
- Place of birth: Cuenca, Spain
- Position: Defender

Team information
- Current team: Spain women's U17 (manager)

Senior career*
Years	Team	Apps	(Gls)
2006–2010	Fundación Albacete		

Managerial career
- 2018: Atlético Tomelloso Femenino
- 2019–2021: Suzuka Point Getters
- 2022–2023: Juárez (women)
- 2023–2024: UANL (women)
- 2025–: Spain U17 (women)
- * Club domestic league appearances and goals

Milagros "Mila" Martínez Domínguez (born 23 April 1985) is a Spanish football manager.

== Early life ==
Born in Cuenca, Spain, Martínez lived in her family's village, Fuentelespino de Haro, until she turned 18. Later, she played as a defender for a Spanish college team, as well as Segunda División side Fundación Albacete. She later went on to work as a coach, and then youth team co-ordinator, for Fundación Albacete.

== Managerial career ==
After spending less than a year in Spain managing the women's team of CD Atlético Tomelloso, Martínez received an offer to manage overseas. She was appointed manager of Suzuka Point Getters in January 2019. With this appointment, she became the first female manager in Japanese men's football at any level. Her first victory came in a 4–1 win over Tegevajaro Miyazaki in March 2019. Her contract was renewed ahead of the 2020 season, and then again for the 2021 season.

After winning in the first round of the 2021 Emperor's Cup, Martínez's Point Getters were drawn against Vissel Kobe, to whom they lost 4–0. On 5 July 2021, Suzuka Point Getters announced Martínez's departure from the club by mutual consent and published her gratitude to fans throughout her tenure.

Prior to the 2022 Apertura, Martínez was named the manager of Liga MX Femenil club Juárez. The club finished the season in eleventh place, just missing out on the Liguilla ("little league"), Liga MX Femenil's play-off phase of the tournament. In the 2023 Clasura, Juárez finished the season in sixth place, making their first Liguilla, where they would be beaten over two legs in the quarter-finals by eventual champions Club América. In June 2023, Martínez was named the manager of Tigres. The following month, Tigres won the 2023 Campeón de Campeones, by beating América over two legs. In the 2023 Apertura, Tigres finished the season in first place, and then went on to win the play-offs. In the 2024 Clasura, Tigres finished the season in third place, but would be beaten over two legs in the semi-finals by América. Tigres won the 2024 Campeón de Campeones, by beating Monterrey over two legs. In the 2024 Apertura, Tigres finished the season in second place behind Monterrey, and went on to face the same opposition in the play-off final. Tigres were 3–0 up on aggregate, before conceding three unanswered goals in the second half of the second leg match. This resulted in a penalty shoot out, which Monterrey won 4–3. Martínez left the club by mutual consent in December 2024, and was succeeded by fellow compatriot Pedro Martínez Losa (no relation).

== Managerial statistics ==
Managerial record by team and tenure
Team	From	To	Record				
Team	From	To	P	W	D	L	Win %
Suzuka Point Getters	2019	2021	62	20	19	23	32.3
Total			62	20	19	23	32.3

== Honours ==
=== Manager ===
Tigres Femenil

- Liga MX Femenil: 2023 Apertura
- Campeón de Campeones Femenil: 2023, 2024
