= Atletico Suzuka Club =

Japanese football club

Atletico Suzuka アトレチコ鈴鹿
- Full name: Atletico Suzuka Club
- Nicknames: The Racers; Atletico
- Founded: 1980; 46 years ago as Mie Club
- Stadium: Suzuka Sports Garden; Suzuka, Mie
- Capacity: 12,500 (3,330 seated)
- Chairman: Hiroshi Saito
- Manager: Park Kang-jo
- League: Tōkai Adult Soccer League Division 1
- 2025: JFL, 15th of 16 (relegated via play-off)
- Website: atletico-suzuka.com
| Home colours | Away colours |

Atletico Suzuka Club (アトレチコ鈴鹿クラブ, Atorechiko Suzuka Kurabu) commonly known as Atletico Suzuka, formerly Suzuka Point Getters (鈴鹿ポイントゲッターズ, Suzuka Pointo Gettāzu) is a Japanese professional football club based in Suzuka, Mie Prefecture. They are set to compete in the Tōkai Adult Soccer League Division 1 from the 2026–27 season, the fifth tier of the Japanese football league system, following their relegation from the Japan Football League in 2025.

== History ==
The club was originally established in Nabari, Mie in 1980 under the name Mie Club, and it became a member of Mie Football Association to join the Mie prefectural league in 1982. The club went up to the top division in 1991 and remained there until 2005, when local organisers kicked off the idea of developing a larger and more ambitious football team.

The region to the southwest of Nagoya has been traditionally very populous but still undeveloped from a football perspective despite a number of successes by local high school football. In mid- 2005, a group of local businessmen, football fans and coaches from Mie Prefecture, who were eager to put together a team to represent the area, approached Bunji Kimura, an ex-football manager of Kyoto Sanga F.C. and Yokohama Flügels. Kimura was convinced to accept the position of the president and technical director of a club that was then going by the name of "W.S.C. Nabari Admiral". Kimura plunged in and began a very ambitious project to transform the team from a bunch of amateur kickers in a tiny town to a much more competitive and tightly run organisation representing the aspirations of the entire prefecture.

At Kimura's insistence, the team in February 2006 took the name "MIE FC Rampole", taking its name from the famous Japanese mystery novel writer Rampo Edogawa, who was born in Mie Prefecture. The part "ole" of the name is supposedly a Spanish word "Olé" used to cheer and applaud (cf. Consadole Sapporo). Following the name change the club launched its official website on February 22. Kimura quickly began drawing upon his network of J.League contacts to bring in more experienced coaches and organisers, and by the end of his first season in charge the club advanced to the second division of the Tōkai Regional League.

Whereas its progress on the pitch has stalled temporarily, with third-place finishes in both 2007 and 2008, the club has been focusing most of its attention on the organisational goals. An independent corporation was established in 2006, fulfilling one of the requirements of J. League Associate Membership, and in 2008 the team merged with nearby Suzuka Club, thereby absorbing a youth program that can help to meet another key requirement. Following the merger, the team announced on 1 September 2008, that it changed its name to "F.C. Suzuka Rampole" and moved its home playing ground from Ueno Athletic Park Stadium to Suzuka Sports Garden from 2009 season. The club carried out the move since first, Suzuka is the city world-famous for the F1 circuit located outside town, and second, its population base and location, squarely in the middle of Mie Prefecture's main population centres is considered to be ideal.

On 28 January 2016, the team announced an immediate change of the team's name to Suzuka Unlimited FC (鈴鹿アンリミテッドFC).

With the appointment of coach Milagros "Mila" Martínez from the 2019 season, the club was the first and to date only in any of Japan's national level divisions to have a female leading the club.

On 1 February 2020, the club announced that it would change its name to Suzuka Point Getters (鈴鹿ポイントゲッターズ). Their logo and attire were updated to reflect Suzuka's status as home of the Suzuka Circuit.

On 5 July 2021, Suzuka announced Martínez's departure by mutual consent after her contract lapsed and published her gratitude to Point Getter fans throughout her tenure. Ten days later, former J3 League coach Yasutoshi Miura was hired to succeed her and also be Suzuka's general manager.

On 28 July 2023, two days prior to the J3 license application deadline, a meeting of the J.League Board of Directors was held. As a result, one of the decisions made was that the league decided to revoke Suzuka's "J.League 100 Year Plan club status", which was a prerequisite for J3 promotion in the next season. This punishment was treated by local media as "unprecedently severe", as no club had ever received such a punishment (Nara Club was initially stripped off the status on 2020, but their ban was eventually lifted within five months). It was mainly motivated by Suzuka's match-fixing scandal by former executives during the last rounds of the 2022 Japan Football League, but most specially in the last match, played against Sony Sendai FC. In this match, Suzuka decided to voluntarily lose the match as Sendai, who was higher-ranked, would be able to overtake Suzuka's local rivals Veertien Mie, denying them promotion for the J3 League, and not enabling Veertien to become the first team of the prefecture to be promoted from the JFL. The whole match-fixing situation was by the J.League treated as "an act that goes against the purpose of the J.League". However, it was not the only problem surrounding the club at the time, as the club had many management problems on different areas, including inappropriate payments and the management structure itself. The J.League then exhorted the club to improve the club's entire management structure before having its promotion-enabling license again.

On 31 October 2023, Suzuka announced that Kyodo Rubber Co., Ltd. became the club's new owner after purchasing a 100% stake. Hiroshi Saito, a former Japanese football player, and the representative director and president of the company, was appointed as the club's new chairman.

The club changed its name to Atletico Suzuka Club (アトレチコ鈴鹿クラブ), announced at a press conference on 10 January 2024. The emblem and logo were also updated, with the black and white-checkered flag being kept in the redesign alongside their official team colours (blue and green).

On 30 November 2025, Atletico Suzuka was relegated to the Tōkai Adult Soccer League for the 2026–27 season after a narrow 1–0 defeat to Vonds Ichihara, with Yuji Kato scoring in the 98th minute of the promotion-relegation play-off, ending their seven-year run in the fourth tier.

== Changes in club name ==
- Mie Club: 1980
- MIE FC Rampole: 2006–2015
- Suzuka Unlimited FC: 2016–2019
- Suzuka Point Getters: 2020–2023
- Atletico Suzuka Club: 2024–present

== League and cup record ==
| Champions | Runners-up | Third place | Promoted | Relegated |

| League | | | | | | | | | | | | | Emperor's Cup | Shakaijin Cup |
| Season | Division | Tier | Pos. | P | W | D | L | F | A | GD | Pts | Att/G | Emperor's Cup | Shakaijin Cup |
|---|---|---|---|---|---|---|---|---|---|---|---|---|---|---|
MIE FC Rampole
| 2005 | Mie Prefectural League (Div. 1) | 6 | 3rd | 13 | 8 | 3 | 2 | 41 | 11 | 30 | 26 | | Did not qualify | Did not qualify |
| 2006 | Mie Prefectural League (Div. 1) | 6 | 2nd | 14 | 10 | 2 | 2 | 33 | 6 | 27 | 32 | | Did not qualify | Did not qualify |
| 2007 | Tōkai Adult Soccer League (Div. 2) | 5 | 3rd | 14 | 7 | 3 | 4 | 24 | 13 | 11 | 24 | | Did not qualify | Did not qualify |
| 2008 | Tōkai Adult Soccer League (Div. 2) | 5 | 3rd | 14 | 7 | 4 | 3 | 21 | 13 | 8 | 25 | | Did not qualify | Did not qualify |
| 2009 | Tōkai Adult Soccer League (Div. 2) | 5 | 1st | 14 | 10 | 4 | 0 | 43 | 10 | 33 | 34 | | Did not qualify | 1st round |
| 2010 | Tōkai Adult Soccer League (Div. 1) | 4 | 4th | 16 | 7 | 6 | 3 | 24 | 15 | 9 | 27 | | Did not qualify | Did not qualify |
| 2011 | Tōkai Adult Soccer League (Div. 1) | 4 | 2nd | 14 | 7 | 2 | 5 | 22 | 21 | -1 | 23 | | 2nd round | |
| 2012 | Tōkai Adult Soccer League (Div. 1) | 4 | 1st | 14 | 9 | 4 | 1 | 28 | 15 | 13 | 31 | | 2nd round | |
| 2013 | Tōkai Adult Soccer League (Div. 1) | 4 | 6th | 14 | 6 | 2 | 6 | 22 | 24 | -2 | 20 | | Did not qualify | |
| 2014 | Tōkai Adult Soccer League (Div. 1) | 5 | 1st | 14 | 11 | 0 | 3 | 33 | 15 | 18 | 33 | | Did not qualify | |
| 2015 | Tōkai Adult Soccer League (Div. 1) | 5 | 2nd | 14 | 10 | 1 | 3 | 32 | 14 | 18 | 31 | | Did not qualify | |
Suzuka Unlimited FC
| 2016 | Tōkai Adult Soccer League (Div. 1) | 5 | 2nd | 14 | 10 | 2 | 2 | 38 | 17 | 21 | 32 | | 2nd round | Runners-up |
| 2017 | Tōkai Adult Soccer League (Div. 1) | 5 | 1st | 14 | 11 | 1 | 2 | 35 | 11 | 24 | 34 | | 1st round | Winners |
| 2018 | Tōkai Adult Soccer League (Div. 1) | 5 | 1st | 14 | 12 | 1 | 1 | 37 | 6 | 31 | 37 | | 1st round | 2nd round |
| 2019 | JFL | 4 | 12th | 30 | 9 | 9 | 12 | 40 | 44 | -4 | 36 | 553 | Did not qualify | Not eligible |
Suzuka Point Getters
| 2020 † | JFL | 4 | 5th | 15 | 6 | 3 | 6 | 23 | 19 | 4 | 21 | 246 | 1st round | Not eligible |
| 2021 † | JFL | 4 | 4th | 32 | 15 | 5 | 12 | 51 | 46 | 5 | 50 | 385 | 2nd round | Not eligible |
| 2022 | JFL | 4 | 9th | 30 | 12 | 5 | 13 | 31 | 40 | -9 | 41 | 2,312 | 2nd round | Not eligible |
| 2023 | JFL | 4 | 9th | 28 | 10 | 6 | 12 | 34 | 41 | -7 | 36 | 473 | Did not qualify | Not eligible |
Atletico Suzuka Club
| 2024 | JFL | 4 | 11th | 30 | 10 | 7 | 13 | 39 | 42 | -3 | 37 | 729 | Did not qualify | Not eligible |
| 2025 | JFL | 4 | 15th | 30 | 7 | 7 | 16 | 30 | 46 | -16 | 28 | 1,152 | Did not qualify | Not eligible |
| 2026–27 | Tōkai Adult Soccer League (Div. 1) | 5 | TBA | 18 | | | | | | | | | TBD | |

Key

- Pos. = Position in league; P = Games played; W = Games won; D = Games drawn; L = Games lost; F = Goals scored; A = Goals conceded; GD = Goals difference; Pts = Points gained
- Att/G (Attendance per game) = Average home league match attendance
- † 2020 & 2021 seasons attendances reduced by COVID-19 worldwide pandemic
- Source: J.League Data Site

== Honours ==
Atletico Suzuka Club
| Honour | No. | Years | Notes |
|---|---|---|---|
| Tōkai League Division 2 | 1 | 2009 | as F.C. Suzuka Rampole |
| Tōkai Soccer League Division 1 | 1 | 2012, 2014, 2017, 2018 | as F.C. Suzuka Rampole (2012 & 2014) as Suzuka Unlimited (2017 & 2018) |
| Shakaijin Cup | 1 | 2017 | |

== Current squad ==
As of 7 February 2025. Note: Flags indicate national team as defined under FIFA eligibility rules; some limited exceptions apply. Players may hold more than one non-FIFA nationality.

| No. | Pos. | Nation | Player |
|---|---|---|---|
| 1 | GK | JPN | Takaya Deguchi |
| 2 | DF | JPN | Kei Sakamoto |
| 3 | DF | JPN | Takaichi Yamashita |
| 4 | DF | JPN | Keito Shoji |
| 5 | DF | JPN | Ryo Hiraide |
| 6 | MF | JPN | Ryota Onodera |
| 7 | DF | JPN | Keita Hidaka |
| 8 | MF | JPN | Shu Maeda |
| 9 | FW | JPN | Tomoya Fukumoto |
| 10 | MF | GHA | Mohammed Lamine |
| 11 | FW | JPN | Kazuyoshi Miura (on loan from Yokohama FC) |
| 13 | FW | JPN | Tomoya Kitamura |
| 14 | DF | JPN | Yuto Kide |

| No. | Pos. | Nation | Player |
|---|---|---|---|
| 15 | DF | JPN | Romio Obonaya |
| 16 | DF | JPN | Takahiro Horie |
| 17 | DF | JPN | Yuto Fujita |
| 18 | MF | JPN | Hiro Mizuguchi (on loan from Renofa Yamaguchi) |
| 19 | DF | JPN | Ibuki Morita |
| 20 | GK | JPN | Enishi Isayama |
| 21 | FW | JPN | Tatsunori Miyoshi |
| 22 | FW | JPN | Sota Kiri |
| 23 | DF | JPN | Riu Watanabe |
| 24 | FW | JPN | Yuki Miyazaki |
| 25 | FW | JPN | Naoki Tanaka |
| 26 | DF | JPN | Wataru Ise |
| 33 | GK | BRA | Diego Washington |

== Coaching staff ==
| Position | Staff |
|---|---|
| Manager | (South Korea) Park Kang-jo |
| Assistant Manager | (Japan) Yohei Iwasaki (Japan) Nobuhiro Kato (Japan) Masaru Sumida |
| Academy director | (Japan) Noboru Saito |

== Managerial history ==
| Manager | Nationality | Tenure | |
| Manager | Nationality | Start | Finish |
|---|---|---|---|
| Bunji Kimura | Japan | 1 January 2007 | 31 December 2010 |
| Narita Takaki | Japan | 1 February 2011 | 31 January 2015 |
| Koichi Ozawa | Japan | 1 February 2015 | 31 August 2017 |
| Yohei Kurakawa | Japan | 1 September 2017 | 31 January 2018 |
| Keiju Karashima | Japan | 1 February 2018 | 31 January 2019 |
| Mila Martínez | Spain | 1 February 2019 | 5 July 2021 |
| Tsukasa Ozawa | Japan | 5 July 2021 | 15 July 2021 |
| Yasutoshi Miura | Japan | 15 July 2021 | 17 February 2024 |
| Noboru Saito | Japan | 29 February 2024 | 30 June 2024 |
| Park Kang-jo | South Korea | 1 July 2024 | present |
