= Tomoya Fukumoto =

Japanese footballer

Tomoya Fukumoto 福元友哉
Personal information
- Full name: Tomoya Fukumoto
- Date of birth: 17 July 1999 (age 27)
- Place of birth: Kanagawa, Japan
- Height: 1.80 m (5 ft 11 in)
- Position: Forward

Team information
- Current team: Briobecca Urayasu
- Number: 9

Youth career
- 2015–2017: Ichiritsu Funabashi High School

Senior career*
Years	Team	Apps	(Gls)
2018–2023	Fagiano Okayama	45	(1)
2022-2023	FC Osaka (loan)	3	(0)
2024–2025	Atletico Suzuka Club	43	(12)
2026–	Briobecca Urayasu	2	(0)
Total		93	(13)
- * Club domestic league appearances and goals as of 21:39, 30 March 2026 (UTC)

Tomoya Fukumoto (福元 友哉, Fukumoto Tomoya; born 17 July 1999) is a Japanese footballer for Briobecca Urayasu.

== Early life ==
Fukumoto was born in Kanagawa.

== Club career ==
After attending Funabashi Municipal High School, Fukumoto signed for Fagiano Okayama for 2018 season. He made his debut for the club on 4 March 2018 against Tochigi SC. He scored his first goal for the club on 24 July 2023, scoring in the 90th+1st minute against Roasso Kumamoto.

== Club statistics ==
As of 30 March 2026.

Appearances and goals by club, season and competition
Club	Season	League			National cup (Note: Includes Emperors Cup)		Other		Total	
Club	Season	Division	Apps	Goals	Apps	Goals	Apps	Goals	Apps	Goals
Fagiano Okayama	2018	J2 League	10	0	1	0	–		11	0
Fagiano Okayama	2019	J2 League	18	0	1	1	–		19	1
Fagiano Okayama	2020	J2 League	5	0	0	0	–		5	0
Fagiano Okayama	2021	J2 League	4	0	0	0	–		4	0
Fagiano Okayama	2022	J2 League	0	0	1	0	–		1	0
Fagiano Okayama	2023	J2 League	8	1	2	0	–		10	1
Fagiano Okayama	Total		45	1	5	1	0	0	50	2
FC Osaka (loan)	2022	JFL	3	0	–		–		3	0
Atletico Suzuka Club	2024	JFL	19	5	–		0	0	19	5
Atletico Suzuka Club	2025	JFL	24	7	–		1 (Note: Appearance in JFL Promotion/Relegation Series)	0	25	7
Atletico Suzuka Club	Total		43	12	0	0	1	0	44	12
Briobecca Urayasu	2026	JFL Cup	2	0	–		–		2	0
Career total			93	13	5	1	1	0	99	14
