= FM Ham-star =

FM Ham-star (JOZZ8AQ-FM)

Japan
- Broadcast area: Asaminami-ku/ Higashi-ku/ Nishi-ku, Hiroshima/ Nishi-ku/ Asakita-ku in Hiroshima
- Frequency: 79.0 MHz

Programming
- Format: News/Talk/Music

Ownership
- Owner: Hiroshima University of Economics

History
- First air date: May 11, 2009

Technical information
- ERP: 20 watts

Links
- Website: FM Ham-star (under construction)

FM Ham-star (FMハムスター) is a Japanese community FM radio station in Asaminami-ku, Hiroshima.

== Overview ==
The station was established on January 13, 2009. The broadcasting licence was given by Japan Ministry of Internal Affairs and Communications on March 26, 2009.

The station went on the air on May 11, 2009.

It is operated by the students of Hiroshima University of Economics.

The station name comes from its location of Hiroshima Asa Minamiku and their wish to be a Star of Hiroshima-Asaminami-ku.

The radio broadcast can be received in Asaminami-ku, Higashi-ku, Nishi-ku, Nishi-ku, Asakita-ku, Naka-ku, and Minami-ku in Hiroshima.
