= Shu Maeda =

Japanese footballer (born 1993)

Personal information
- Date of birth: 2 December 1993 (age 32)
- Place of birth: Mie, Japan
- Height: 1.70 m (5 ft 7 in)
- Position: Midfielder

Team information
- Current team: Atletico Suzuka Club
- Number: 4

Youth career
- FC Yokkaichi
- Jubilo Iwata

College career
Years	Team	Apps	(Gls)
2012–2015	Kanagawa University		

Senior career*
Years	Team	Apps	(Gls)
2016–2022	Vanraure Hachinohe	103	(3)
2022-	Atletico Suzuka Club	37	(0)
Total		140	(3)
- * Club domestic league appearances and goals as of 17:04, 10 November 2020 (UTC)

Shu Maeda (前田 柊, Maeda Shu; born 2 December 1993) is a Japanese footballer currently playing as a midfielder for Vanraure Hachinohe.

== Career statistics ==
As of 10 November 2020.

Appearances and goals by club, season and competition
Club	Season	League			Emperor's Cup		J.League Cup		Other		Total	
Club	Season	Division	Apps	Goals	Apps	Goals	Apps	Goals	Apps	Goals	Apps	Goals
Vanraure Hachinohe	2016	JFL	12	0	0	0	–		0	0	12	0
Vanraure Hachinohe	2017	JFL	14	0	3	0	–		0	0	17	0
Vanraure Hachinohe	2018	JFL	12	2	0	0	–		0	0	12	2
Vanraure Hachinohe	2019	J3 League	18	0	2	0	0	0	0	0	20	0
Vanraure Hachinohe	2020	J3 League	22	0	0	0	0	0	0	0	22	0
Career total			78	2	5	0	0	0	0	0	83	2
