= Gaku Sugamoto =

Japanese footballer (born 1994)

Gaku Sugamoto 菅本 岳
Personal information
- Full name: Gaku Sugamoto
- Date of birth: September 10, 1994 (age 32)
- Place of birth: Kawasaki, Japan
- Height: 1.76 m (5 ft 9 1/2 in)
- Position: Midfielder

Team information
- Current team: Matsue City FC
- Number: 11

Youth career
- 2013–2016: Rikkyo University

Senior career*
Years	Team	Apps	(Gls)
2017–2019	Grulla Morioka	69	(7)
2020–	Matsue City FC		
- * Club domestic league appearances and goals as of 22 February 2020

Gaku Sugamoto (菅本 岳, Sugamoto Gaku; born September 10, 1994) is a Japanese football player. He plays for Matsue City FC.

== Career ==
Gaku Sugamoto joined J3 League club Grulla Morioka in 2017.

== Club statistics ==
Updated to 22 February 2020.

Club performance			League		Cup		Total	
Season	Club	League	Apps	Goals	Apps	Goals	Apps	Goals
Japan			League		Emperor's Cup		Total	
2017	Grulla Morioka	J3 League	28	4	2	1	30	5
2018	Grulla Morioka	J3 League	24	3	1	0	25	3
2019	Grulla Morioka	J3 League	16	0	1	0	17	0
Total			69	7	4	1	73	8
