= Kei Sakamoto =

Japanese footballer (born 2001)

Personal information
- Date of birth: 5 July 2001 (age 25)
- Place of birth: Tottori, Japan
- Height: 1.76 m (5 ft 9 in)
- Position: Defender

Team information
- Current team: Atletico Suzuka
- Number: 2

Youth career
- SC Tottori
- –2020: Gainare Tottori

Senior career*
Years	Team	Apps	(Gls)
2020–2024	Gainare Tottori	35	(0)
2024	→ Atletico Suzuka (loan)	12	(3)
2025–	Atletico Suzuka	4	(0)
- * Club domestic league appearances and goals as of 30 March 2025

Kei Sakamoto (坂本 敬, Sakamoto Kei; born 5 July 2001) is a Japanese footballer who plays as a defender for club Atletico Suzuka.

== Career statistics ==
As of 13 November 2020.

Club	Season	League			National Cup		League Cup		Other		Total	
Club	Season	Division	Apps	Goals	Apps	Goals	Apps	Goals	Apps	Goals	Apps	Goals
Gainare Tottori	2020	J3 League	2	0	0	0	0	0	0	0	2	0
Career total			2	0	0	0	0	0	0	0	2	0
