= All Japan Senior Football Championship =

- Founded: 1965; 61 years ago
- Region: Japan
- Teams: 32
- Current champions: Veroskronos Tsuno (1st title) (2025)
- Most championships: Honda Luminoso Sayama FC (3 titles)
- 2026 All Japan Senior Football Championship

The All Japan Senior Football Championship (Japanese: 全国社会人サッカー選手権大会, Hepburn: Zenkoku Shakaijin Sakkā Senshuken Taikai), officially called the All Japan Adults Football Tournament, is a football (soccer) cup competition in Japan. It is run by the Japan Football Association. As it only involves non-league teams (teams not affiliated to either J.League or the Japan Football League), it can be considered an equivalent of the FA Trophy or FA Vase in England.

== Overview ==
The "Shakaijin", "Shakaijin Cup" or "Zensha" as it is known, was first established in 1965 to determine potential entrants to the Japan Soccer League. The winner and runner-up played off in a promotion and relegation series against the bottom two clubs of the JSL. This continued even after the JSL added a Second Division in 1972. Since 1977, however, there is a system called the "Regional Football Champions League" to promote new league entrants (to the JSL 2nd Division, the former Japan Football League, and the current Japan Football League), thus the "Shakaijin" is now effectively a non-league cup competition. The 1999 edition was the only one to feature teams from the current JFL; otherwise, all participant clubs have been from the regional leagues.

The format is a week-long elimination tournament in a host locale (originally a single city, now a major metropolitan area) chosen by the JFA beforehand, and the best clubs of the regional leagues (currently 32 entrants) qualify. The final takes place in a major stadium in the largest host city or prefectural capital. The winner automatically qualifies to the Regional Champions League (runners-up and third places may also qualify depending on berth availability).

Many former Shakaijin winners are now J.League members, so the cup, despite no longer guaranteeing promotion, is considered a crucial stepping stone by ambitious clubs.

== List of winners ==
Year	Winner	Score	Runner-up	Location(s)
1965	Nippon Kokan	3–1	Urawa Club	Beppu, Ōita
1966	Urawa Club	1–0	Nippon Kokan	Omiya
1967	Nagoya Bank	4–1	Toyota Motors	Yokohama
1968	Toyota Motors	1–0	Urawa Club	Shimabara, Nagasaki
1969	Kofu Club (shared)	1–1 (a.e.t.)	Urawa Club (shared)	Tōno, Iwate
1970	Toyota Motors	1–0	Kofu Club	Fujieda, Shizuoka
1971	Towa Real Estate	1–0	Tanabe Pharmaceutical	Saga
1972	Eidai Industries	5–0	Teijin SC Matsuyama	Ichihara, Chiba
1973	Sumitomo	2–1	Ibaraki Hitachi	Hitachi, Ibaraki
1974	Honda Giken	3–0	Yanmar Club	Kagoshima
1975	Yanmar Club	3–1	Furukawa Electric Chiba	Shizuoka
1976	Nissan Motors	1–0	Dainichi Nippon Densen	
1977	Toshiba Horikawa-cho	2–0	NTT Kansai	
1978	Saitama Teachers	2–0	Hyōgo Teachers	Nobeoka, Miyazaki
1979	Toho Titanium	2–0	Mazda Auto Hiroshima	
1980	Dainichi Nippon Cable SC	2–0	Osaka Gas	
1981	NTT Kanto	2–1	Ibaraki Hitachi	
1982	Osaka Gas	3–1	Shizuoka Gas	
1983	Matsushita	5–0	NTT Kansai	
1984	Kyoto Police Dept.	2–1	Shimizu Club	
1985	NTT Kansai (shared)	1–1	Yamanashi Club (shared)	
1986	Furukawa Electric Chiba	4–3	Tokyo Gas	
1987	Akita City Government	1–0	Furukawa Electric Chiba	
1988	Kyoto Shiko Club	2–0	Mazda Auto Hiroshima	
1989	Chuo Bohan	2–0	Furukawa Electric Chiba	Kasuga, Fukuoka
1990	Chuo Bohan	3–1	Ibaraki Hitachi	Kanazawa
1991	PJM Futures	2–0	Seino Unyu	Tsuruoka, Yamagata
1992	PJM Futures	2–0	Nippon Denso	Takamatsu, Kagawa
1993	Yokogawa Denki	3–2	YKK	
1994	Ibaraki Hitachi	1–0	Hokuriku Electric Power Co.	
1995	Prima Ham FC Tsuchiura	1–0	Albireo Niigata	
1996	F.C. Kyoto BAMB 1993	1–1; PK 4–3	Prima Ham FC Tsuchiura	Takatsuki, Osaka
1997	Yokogawa Denki	1–0; AET	Honda Luminoso Sayama F.C.	Fujisawa, Kanagawa; Yokohama
1998	NTT Kyushu	3–0	Norbritz Hokkaido	
1999	Honda Giken	4–0	Sony Sendai FC	Toyama; Takaoka, Toyama
2000	Sagawa Express Tokyo SC	3–2	Sagawa Printing SC	Sendai, Miyagi (final); Naruse, Miyagi; Rifu, Miyagi; Shichigahama, Miyagi; Matsushima, Miyagi
2001	Sagawa Express Osaka S.C.	2–1; AET	Honda Luminoso Sayama F.C.	Nankoku, Kōchi (final); Ochi, Kōchi; Haruno, Kōchi; Hidaka, Kōchi; Noichi, Kōchi
2002	Okinawa Kariyushi FC (shared)	0–0; AET	Honda Luminoso Sayama F.C. (shared)	Shimizu, Shizuoka; Fujieda, Shizuoka
2003	Honda Luminoso Sayama F.C.	3–0	Shizuoka F.C.	Saitama; Kawagoe, Saitama
2004	Honda Luminoso Sayama F.C. (shared)	0–0	Okinawa Kariyushi FC (shared)	Okayama (final); Kurashiki, Okayama; Oku, Okayama
2005	Rosso Kumamoto (shared)	2–2; AET	New Nippon Steel Ōita (shared)	Kobe, Hyōgo (final); Goshiki, Hyōgo; Awaji, Hyōgo; Kakogawa, Hyōgo; Miki, Hyōgo
2006	V-Varen Nagasaki	1–0	Shizuoka F.C.	Akita (final); Yurihonjō, Akita; Nikaho, Akita
2007	F.C. Mi-O Biwako Kusatsu	3–1	Yazaki Valente	Ōita; Beppu, Ōita
2008	A.C. Nagano Parceiro	2–1	NEC Tokin	Niigata
2009	Matsumoto Yamaga	2–1	Zweigen Kanazawa	Ichihara, Chiba
2010	Kamatamare Sanuki	2–0	Nagano Parceiro	Yamaguchi
2011	Tokyo 23 FC	1–0	SC Sagamihara	Ōgaki, Gifu
2012	F.C. Korea	1–0; AET	Fukushima United	Chōfu, Tokyo
2013	Renofa Yamaguchi	1–1; PK 5–4	Grulla Morioka	Shimabara, Nagasaki
2014	FC Osaka	2–0	Club Dragons	Kamitonda, Wakayama
2015	Arterivo Wakayama	1–1; PK 5–3	Hannan University	Morioka, Iwate (final); Hanamaki, Iwate; Takizawa, Iwate; Tōno, Iwate
2016	Mitsubishi Mizushima FC	2–2; PK 5–3	Suzuka Unlimited FC	Saijō, Ehime (final)
2017	Suzuka Unlimited FC	2–1	Matsue City FC	Sakai, Fukui
2018	Matsue City FC	3–2	FC Kariya	Kashima, Ibaraki (final); Hitachinaka, Ibaraki
2019	FC Tiamo Hirakata	1–0	Ococias Kyoto AC	Kirishima, Kagoshima (final); Minamisatsuma, Kagoshima; Shibushi, Kagoshima
2020	Cancelled due to COVID-19 pandemic in Japan			
2021	Cancelled due to COVID-19 pandemic in Japan			
2022	Briobecca Urayasu	0–0; PK 5–3	BTOP Thank Kuriyama	Shibushi, Kagoshima
2023	FC Kariya	1–0; PK 4–2	Arterivo Wakayama	Saga, Saga; Tosu, Saga
2024	Japan Soccer College	1–0	FC Tokushima	Higashiōmi, Shiga (final); Kōka, Shiga; Moriyama, Shiga; Ōtsu, Shiga
2025	Veroskronos Tsuno	2–1	FC Basara Hyogo	Gonohe, Aomori; Hachinohe, Aomori (final); Nanbu, Aomori; Towada, Aomori
2026	Aries Toshima	–	Nankatsu SC	Saito, Miyazaki; Shintomi, Miyazaki (final); Aya, Miyazaki

== See also ==
- Japanese Super Cup
- Emperor's Cup
- J.League Cup
