= 2010 Japanese Regional Football League Competition =

Tournament details
- Country: Japan
- Dates: 21 November to 5 December 2010
- Teams: 12

Final positions
- Champions: Kamatamare Sanuki
- Runners-up: Nagano Parceiro

Tournament statistics
- Matches played: 24
- Goals scored: 70 (2.92 per match)
- Top goal scorer(s): Shin Fujita (Nagano, 4 goals)

The 2010 Japanese Regional Football Champions League was the 34th edition of the finals tournament (Dai 34 Kaizen Kokuchiiki Soccer League Keshōtaikai) was held from November 21 to December 5, 2010 in Ibaraki, Shizuoka, Kochi and It was the final tournament of the All Japan Regional Football League (currently the All Japan Regional Football Champions League) held in Chiba Prefecture.

== Tournament outline ==
For this tournament, the number of participating teams will be reduced from 16 to 12. As a result, the regulations were partially changed from the previous year.

In the first round, twelve teams will be divided into three groups and will play a round-robin of four, with the three first-place teams in each group and the best performing team from the three second-placed teams advancing to the final round. The final round will also be played by four teams in a round-robin league, with the 1st and 2nd place teams automatically promoted to the Japan Football League (JFL), the third-place team advancing to the JFL team reshuffle, the winning team becoming the JFL promoted team, and the losing team remaining in the regional league.

The match format was the same as the previous year, and in both the first round and the final round, if there is a tie in the first half of the second half, it will be played by a complete decision system in which a penalty shootout is played, and the winner = 3 points within the match time, the winner by penalty shootout = 2 points, the loser by penalty shootout = 1 point, the loser within the game time = 0 points, and the points will be allocated according to the following conditions, and "total points", "goal difference", "total number of goals", "results of the match between the teams" The ranking was determined by the order of. If the ranking was not determined by any of the above methods, a ranking match was held only if the first and second places were decided.

== Venue ==
=== First round ===
Group	Match Venue	Location	Image
A	Hitachinaka City Stadium	Hitachinaka City, Ibaraki Prefecture	
B	Fujieda Soccer Stadium	Fujieda, Shizuoka Prefecture	
C	Kochi Haruno Athletic Stadium	Kōchi, Kōchi Prefecture	

=== Final round ===
Match Venue	Location	Image
Ichihara Green Area Sports Park Seaside Stadium	Ichihara, Chiba Prefecture	

== Participating teams ==
=== Group 1 ===
The winners of their respective regional leagues in 2010. (9 teams)

Region	Team
Hokkaido	Sapporo University Goal Plunderers
Tohoku 1st Division	Grulla Morioka
Kanto 1st Division	YSCC Yokohama
Hokushinetsu 1st Division	Nagano Parceiro
Tokai 1st Division	Fujieda MYFC
Kansai 1st Division	Sanyo Electric Sumoto
Chugoku	Renofa Yamaguchi
Shikoku	Kamatamare Sanuki
Kyushu	HOYO Atletico ELAN Oita

=== Group 2 ===
Preferential treatment for clubs claiming to be members of the J. League. (1 Team)

Region	Team
Kanagawa Prefecture 1st Division	SC Sagamihara

=== Group 3 ===
Of the top four teams in the 46th All Japan Adult Football Championship, teams that have not qualified from their respective regional leagues. (up to 2 teams) The following teams had already qualified.

- 1st place Kamatamare Sanuki (1st place in Shikoku)
- 2nd place AC Nagano Parceiro (1st place of Hokushinetsu 1st Division)
- 3rd place SC Sagamihara (JFA preferential treatment)

Region	Team
Tohoku 1st Division	Fukushima United

=== Group 4 ===
If there are fewer than 12 teams under the above conditions, the number of teams registered as members of the All Japan Adult Football Federation as of the end of June 2010 will be replenished by rotating rotations (in FY2010, the order of the Kanto → Kansai → Kyushu).

Region	Team
Kanto 1st Division (2nd place)	Saitama SC

== Match schedule ==
=== Group A ===
Pos	Team	Pld	W	PKW	PKL	L	GF	GA	GD	Pts	Qualification
1	YSCC Yokohama	3	2	0	0	1	6	5	+1	6	Advance to the Final round
2	SC Sagamihara	3	1	1	0	1	7	5	+2	5	
3	HOYO Atletico ELAN Oita	3	1	0	1	1	5	5	0	4	
4	Renofa Yamaguchi	3	1	0	0	2	3	6	−3	3	

Updated to match(es) played on 23 November 2010. Source: RSSSF

=== Group B ===
Pos	Team	Pld	W	PKW	PKL	L	GF	GA	GD	Pts	Qualification
1	Sanyo Sumoto	3	1	1	0	1	6	5	+1	5	Advance to the Final round
2	Grulla Morioka	3	1	1	0	1	3	2	+1	5	
3	Fujieda MYFC	3	1	0	1	1	7	7	0	4	
4	Sapporo University Goal Plunderers	3	1	0	1	1	3	5	−2	4	

Updated to match(es) played on 23 November 2010. Source: RSSSF

=== Group C ===
Pos	Team	Pld	W	PKW	PKL	L	GF	GA	GD	Pts	Qualification
1	Kamatamare Sanuki	3	2	1	0	0	5	3	+2	8	Advance to the Final round
2	Nagano Parceiro	3	1	1	1	0	5	2	+3	6	Advance to the Final round
3	Fukushima United	3	1	0	1	1	4	1	+3	4	
4	Saitama SC	3	0	0	0	3	3	11	−8	0	

Updated to match(es) played on 23 November 2010. Source: RSSSF

=== 2nd place in each group ===
Pos	Team	Pld	W	PKW	PKL	L	GF	GA	GD	Pts	Qualification
1	Nagano Parceiro	3	1	1	1	0	5	2	+3	6	Advance to the Final round
2	SC Sagamihara	3	1	1	0	1	5	2	+3	5	
3	Grulla Morioka	3	1	1	0	1	3	2	+1	5	

Updated to match(es) played on unknown. Source: RSSSF

As a result, AC Nagano Parceiro qualified for the final round.

== Final round ==
Pos	Team	Pld	W	PKW	PKL	L	GF	GA	GD	Pts	Qualification
1	Kamatamare Sanuki	3	2	1	0	0	4	2	+2	8	Promoted to the Japan Football League for 2011 season
2	Nagano Parceiro	3	1	0	2	0	4	0	+4	5	Promoted to the Japan Football League for 2011 season
3	Sanyo Sumoto	3	1	0	0	2	2	6	−4	3	
4	YSCC Yokohama	3	0	1	0	2	3	5	−2	2	

Updated to match(es) played on 5 December 2010. Source: RSSSF

== Final result ==
As a result of the playoffs, the following were the results of the promotion to the Japan Football League (JFL):

Automatic Promotion

- 1st Place - Kamatamare Sanuki
- 2nd Place - AC Nagano Parceiro

Promotion / Relegation Playoff

- 3rd Place - Sanyo Sumoto
