= Sota Kiri =

Japanese footballer

Personal information
- Full name: Sota Kiri
- Date of birth: 22 July 1999 (age 27)
- Place of birth: Kanagawa, Japan
- Height: 1.63 m (5 ft 4 in)
- Position: Forward

Team information
- Current team: Iwate Grulla Morioka
- Number: 11

Youth career
- 2015–2017: Nihon University Fujisawa High School

College career
Years	Team	Apps	(Gls)
2018–2021	Rikkyo University		

Senior career*
Years	Team	Apps	(Gls)
2022–	Iwate Grulla Morioka	31	(2)
- * Club domestic league appearances and goals as of 21:48, 1 December 2023 (UTC)

Sota Kiri (桐 蒼太, Kiri Sota; born 22 July 1999) is a Japanese footballer who plays as a forward for Iwate Grulla Morioka.

== Early life ==
Sota was born in Kanagawa. He went to Nihon University Fujisawa HS and Rikkyo University.

== Career ==
Sota made his debut for Iwate against Machida Zelvia on 27 February 2022. He scored his first goal for the club against Ehime FC on 5 March 2023, scoring in the 23rd minute.

== Career statistics ==
=== Club ===
As of 26 February 2022.

Club	Season	League			National Cup		League Cup		Other		Total	
Club	Season	Division	Apps	Goals	Apps	Goals	Apps	Goals	Apps	Goals	Apps	Goals
Iwate Grulla Morioka	2022	J2 League	1	0	0	0	0	0	0	0	1	0
Career total			1	0	0	0	0	0	0	0	1	0
