= Matsue Athletic Stadium =

Athletic stadium in Matsue, Shimane, Japan

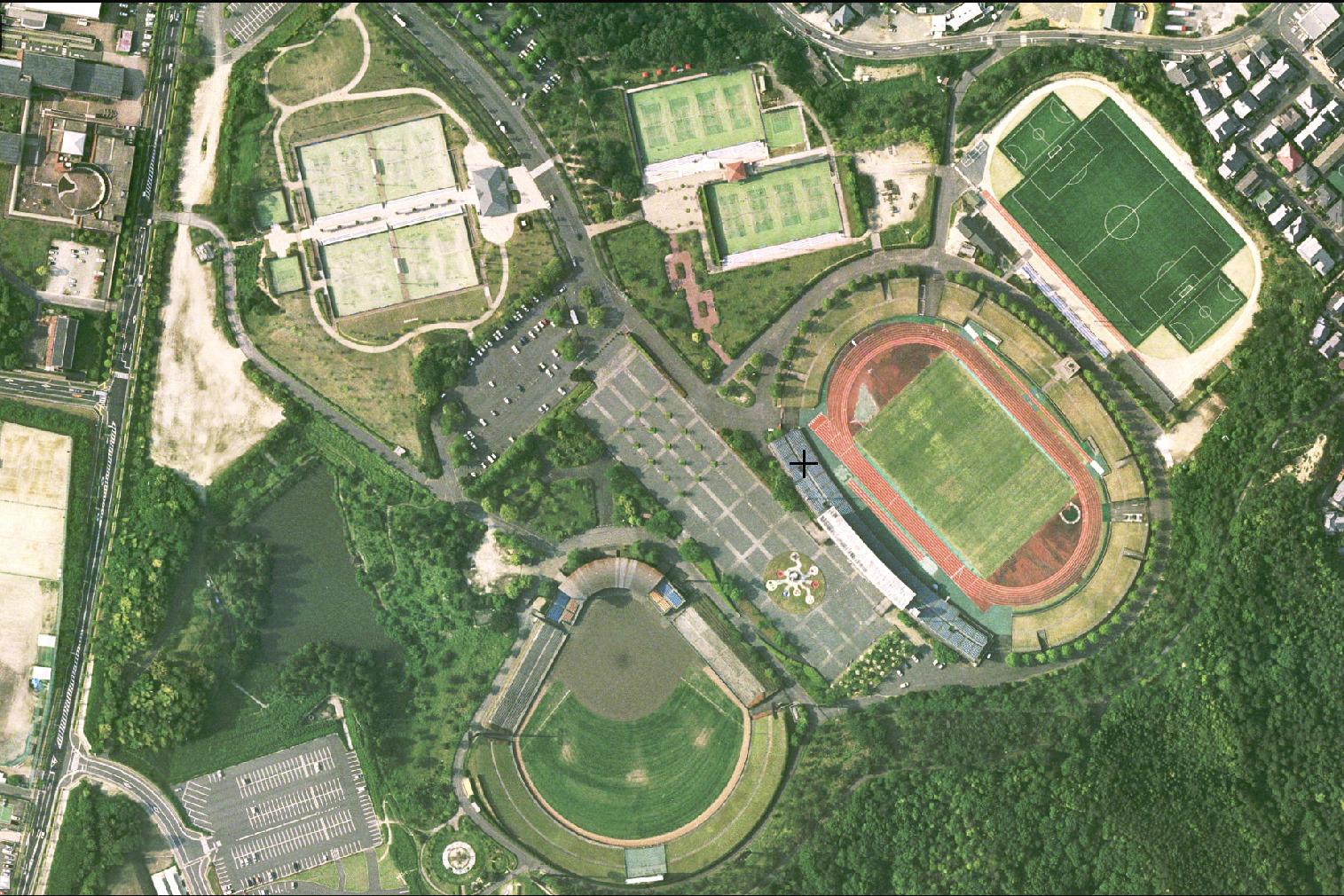
- Interactive map of Matsue Athletic Stadium
- Location: Matsue, Shimane, Japan
- Coordinates: 35°26′13.7″N 133°3′57.5″E
- Owner: Matsue City
- Capacity: 24,000

Construction
- Opened: 1981

Tenant
- Matsue City FC

Matsue Athletic Stadium (松江市陸上競技場, Matsue-shi rikujō kyōgiba) is an athletic stadium in Matsue, Shimane, Japan.
