= Yuto Kide =

Japanese footballer (born 1999)

Personal information
- Full name: Yuto Kide
- Date of birth: 13 February 1999 (age 27)
- Place of birth: Mie, Japan
- Height: 1.68 m (5 ft 6 in)
- Position: Defender

Team information
- Current team: FC Osaka
- Number: 16

Youth career
- Nishigaoka SSS
- –2013: Tsu FC W1
- 2014–2016: Seiryo High School

College career
Years	Team	Apps	(Gls)
2017–2020	Osaka University H&SS		

Senior career*
Years	Team	Apps	(Gls)
2021–2024	Kagoshima United	22	(2)
2024-	FC Osaka	0	(0)
- * Club domestic league appearances and goals as of 3:06, 13 September 2023 (UTC)

Yuto Kide (木出 雄斗, Kide Yuto; born 13 February 1999) is a Japanese footballer currently playing as a defender for Kagoshima United.

== Career ==
Kide made his debut for Kagoshima against Nagano Parceiro, playing the full 90 minutes.

== Career statistics ==
=== Club ===
As of 30 May 2021.

Club	Season	League			National Cup		League Cup		Other		Total	
Club	Season	Division	Apps	Goals	Apps	Goals	Apps	Goals	Apps	Goals	Apps	Goals
Kagoshima United	2021	J3 League	1	0	1 (Note: Appearances in the Emperor's Cup)	0	0	0	0	0	2	0
Career total			1	0	1	0	0	0	0	0	2	0
