= FC Kagura Shimane =

Japanese football club

FC Kagura Shimane FC神楽しまね
- Full name: Football Club Kagura Shimane
- Founded: 2011; 15 years ago, as Matsue City; 2022; 4 years ago, as Kagura Shimane
- Dissolved: 14 March 2023; 2 years ago
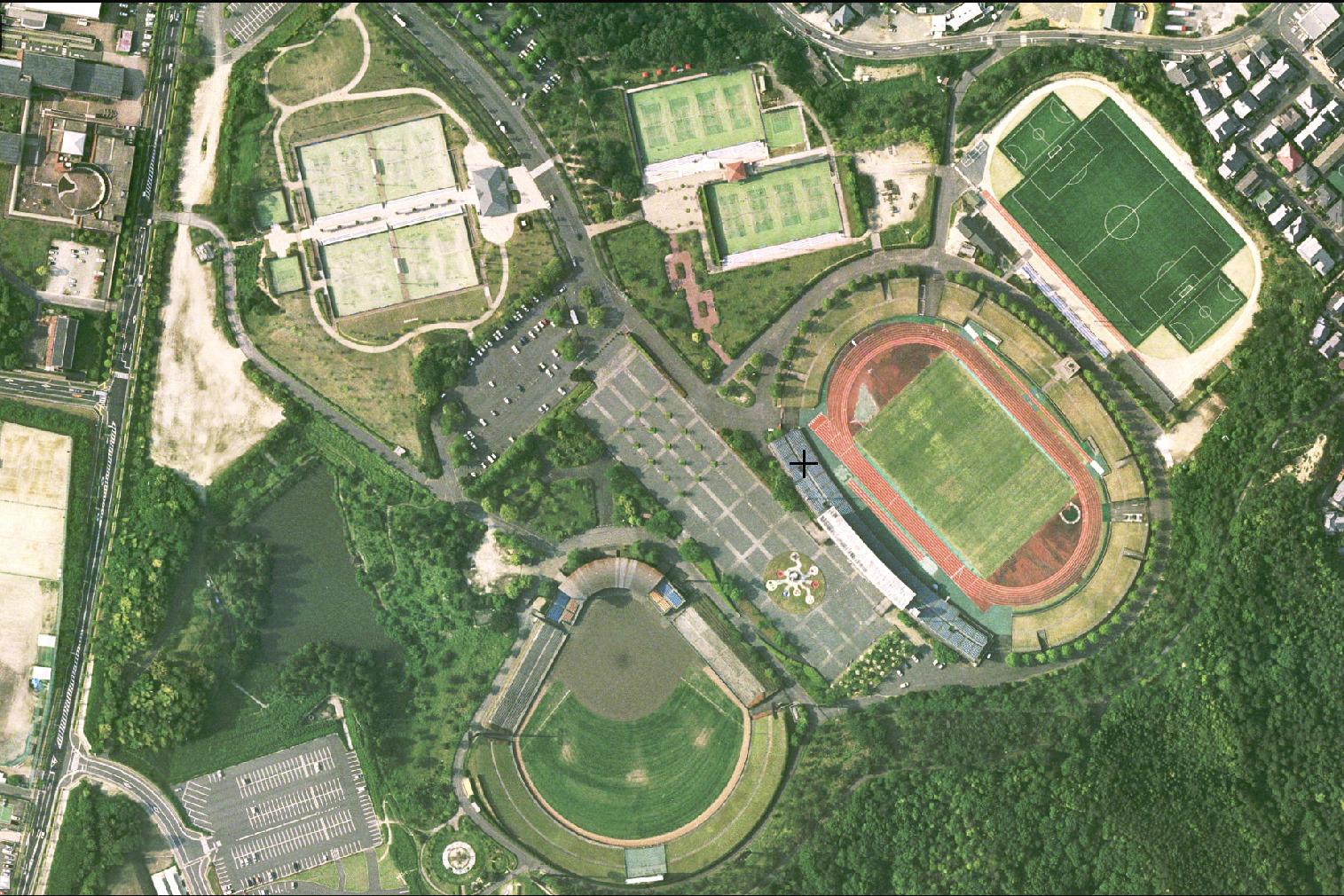
- Stadium: They used the Matsue Athletic Stadium; Matsue, Shimane
- Capacity: 24,000
- 2022: Japan Football League, 12th of 16
| Home colours | Away colours |

FC Kagura Shimane (FC神楽しまね, Efu Sī Kagura Shimane) was a former football club based in Matsue, which is located in Shimane Prefecture in Japan. They last played in the Japan Football League, the Japanese fourth tier of football, until dissolved in 2022.

== History ==
FC Kagura Shimane was founded as Matsue City FC on the basis of a precedent team, which already was playing in Chūgoku Soccer League, Vorador Matsue. In 2011, the new-born club started their new activities to join Japanese professional football as soon as they could. An NPO corporation was made to manage the club and push towards J. League, while winning twice the Chūgoku Soccer League.

They also featured eight times in the Emperor's Cup, getting past the 1st round in 2015, 2017, 2018, 2020.

The team's name was changed from Matsue City FC (松江シティフットボールクラブ, Matsue Shiti Futtobōru Kurabu) to FC Kagura Shimane on February 1, 2022.

The club withdrew from the JFL on 23 January 2023, just a few days after the league schedule was released. Unpaid wages and intern turmoil led to many players leaving the club, with the situation being made public by themselves. On 14 March 2023, after their parent company "Matsue City FC KK" was filed by bankruptcy, the club officially dissolved.

== Changes in club name ==
- Matsue City FC : 2011–2021
- FC Kagura Shimane : 2022

== League & cup record ==
| Champions | Runners-up | Third place | Promoted | Relegated |

| League | | | | | | | | | | | | Emperor's Cup | Shakaijin Cup |
| Season | Division | Tier | Position | P | W | D | L | F | A | GD | Pts | Emperor's Cup | Shakaijin Cup |
|---|---|---|---|---|---|---|---|---|---|---|---|---|---|
| 2010 | Chūgoku Soccer; League | 5 | 3rd | 18 | 11 | 2 | 5 | 50 | 36 | 14 | 35 | Did not qualify | |
As Matsue City FC
| 2011 | Chūgoku Soccer; League | 5 | 7th | 18 | 5 | 3 | 10 | 28 | 37 | -9 | 18 | Did not qualify | 1st round |
| 2012 | Chūgoku Soccer; League | 5 | 3rd | 18 | 12 | 2 | 4 | 36 | 25 | 11 | 38 | 1st round | |
| 2013 | Chūgoku Soccer; League | 5 | 4th | 18 | 7 | 4 | 7 | 39 | 34 | 5 | 25 | Did not qualify | |
| 2014 | Chūgoku Soccer; League | 5 | 1st | 18 | 12 | 2 | 4 | 50 | 20 | 30 | 38 | Did not qualify | Quarter final |
| 2015 | Chūgoku Soccer; League | 5 | 1st | 18 | 17 | 1 | 0 | 70 | 4 | 66 | 52 | 2nd round | 1st round |
| 2016 | Chūgoku Soccer; League | 5 | 2nd | 18 | 12 | 4 | 2 | 48 | 16 | 32 | 40 | 1st round | Quarter final |
| 2017 | Chūgoku Soccer; League | 5 | 2nd | 18 | 14 | 2 | 2 | 82 | 18 | 64 | 44 | 2nd round | Runner's up |
| 2018 | Chūgoku Soccer; League | 5 | 1st | 18 | 18 | 0 | 0 | 76 | 4 | 72 | 54 | 2nd round | Winners |
| 2019 | JFL | 4 | 15th | 30 | 5 | 10 | 15 | 26 | 51 | -25 | 25 | 1st round | Not eligible |
| 2020 | JFL | 4 | 10th | 15 | 6 | 2 | 7 | 18 | 24 | -6 | 20 | 2nd round | Not eligible |
| 2021 | JFL | 4 | 5th | 32 | 14 | 8 | 10 | 38 | 37 | 1 | 50 | 1st round | Not eligible |
As FC Kagura Shimane
| 2022 | JFL | 4 | 12th | 30 | 9 | 7 | 14 | 32 | 42 | -10 | 34 | 2nd round | Not eligible |

Key

- Pos. = Position in league; P = Games played; W = Games won; D = Games drawn; L = Games lost; F = Goals for; A = Goal against; GD = Goal difference; Pts = Points gained

== Honours ==
Chūgoku Soccer League

- Champions (3): 2014, 2015, 2018

All Japan Senior Football Championship

- Winners (1): 2018

Regional Promotion Series

- Winners (1): 2018

== Last team squad ==
Updated to 17 September 2022. Note: Flags indicate national team as defined under FIFA eligibility rules; some limited exceptions apply. Players may hold more than one non-FIFA nationality.

| No. | Pos. | Nation | Player |
|---|---|---|---|
| 1 | GK | JPN | Ryota Inoue |
| 2 | DF | JPN | Kento Sasaki |
| 3 | DF | JPN | Naofumi Shimomura |
| 4 | FW | JPN | Masaki Miyauchi |
| 5 | DF | JPN | Masahiro Baba |
| 6 | MF | JPN | Takuya Kakine |
| 8 | MF | JPN | Keishiro Sato (captain) |
| 9 | FW | JPN | Masaya Yuma |
| 11 | MF | JPN | Gaku Sugamoto |
| 13 | DF | JPN | Shun Tsutsui |
| 14 | MF | JPN | Ren Yamamoto |
| 15 | DF | JPN | Satoru Unemoto |
| 16 | MF | JPN | Tomoya Takahata |
| 18 | FW | JPN | Keisuke Hotta |
| 19 | FW | JPN | Riku Sawada |

| No. | Pos. | Nation | Player |
|---|---|---|---|
| 20 | MF | JPN | Kenta Ishikawa |
| 21 | GK | JPN | Koshiro Takashima |
| 22 | MF | JPN | Akira Sawashima |
| 24 | FW | JPN | Hiroumi Kakura |
| 25 | DF | JPN | Daisuke Matsushita |
| 27 | DF | JPN | Shingo Momoi |
| 28 | DF | JPN | Yusuke Tsukijawa |
| 29 | DF | JPN | Takeru Osada |
| 30 | GK | JPN | Shoto Ikefuji |
| 31 | MF | JPN | Yuzuru Tabira |
| 32 | DF | JPN | Naoya Imamura |
| 33 | GK | JPN | Kenji Tanaka |
| 39 | FW | JPN | Koya Tanio |
| 44 | MF | JPN | Ruka Baba |

== Club Officials ==
For the 2022 season.

| Position | Staff |
|---|---|
| Manager | (Japan) Noriaki Sanenobu |
| Assistant Head Coach | (Japan) Hiroki Matsumoto (Japan) Hidenori Kato |
| Main Manager | (Japan) Kenta Hisayama |

== Managerial history ==
| Manager | Nationality | Tenure | |
| Manager | Nationality | Start | Finish |
|---|---|---|---|
| Hiroyoshi Katayama | Japan | 6 September 2014 | 31 December 2015 |
| Kōji Tanaka | Japan | 1 February 2016 | 31 January 2020 |
| Noriaki Sanenobu | Japan | 1 February 2020 | 31 January 2023 |

== Kit evolution ==
Home kits - 1st
| 2018 | 2019 | 2020 |

Away kits - 2nd
| 2018 | 2019 | 2020 |

== Historical logos ==
2011–2021
