= Hiroshima University of Economics =

Coordinates: 34°26′54″N 132°27′24″E

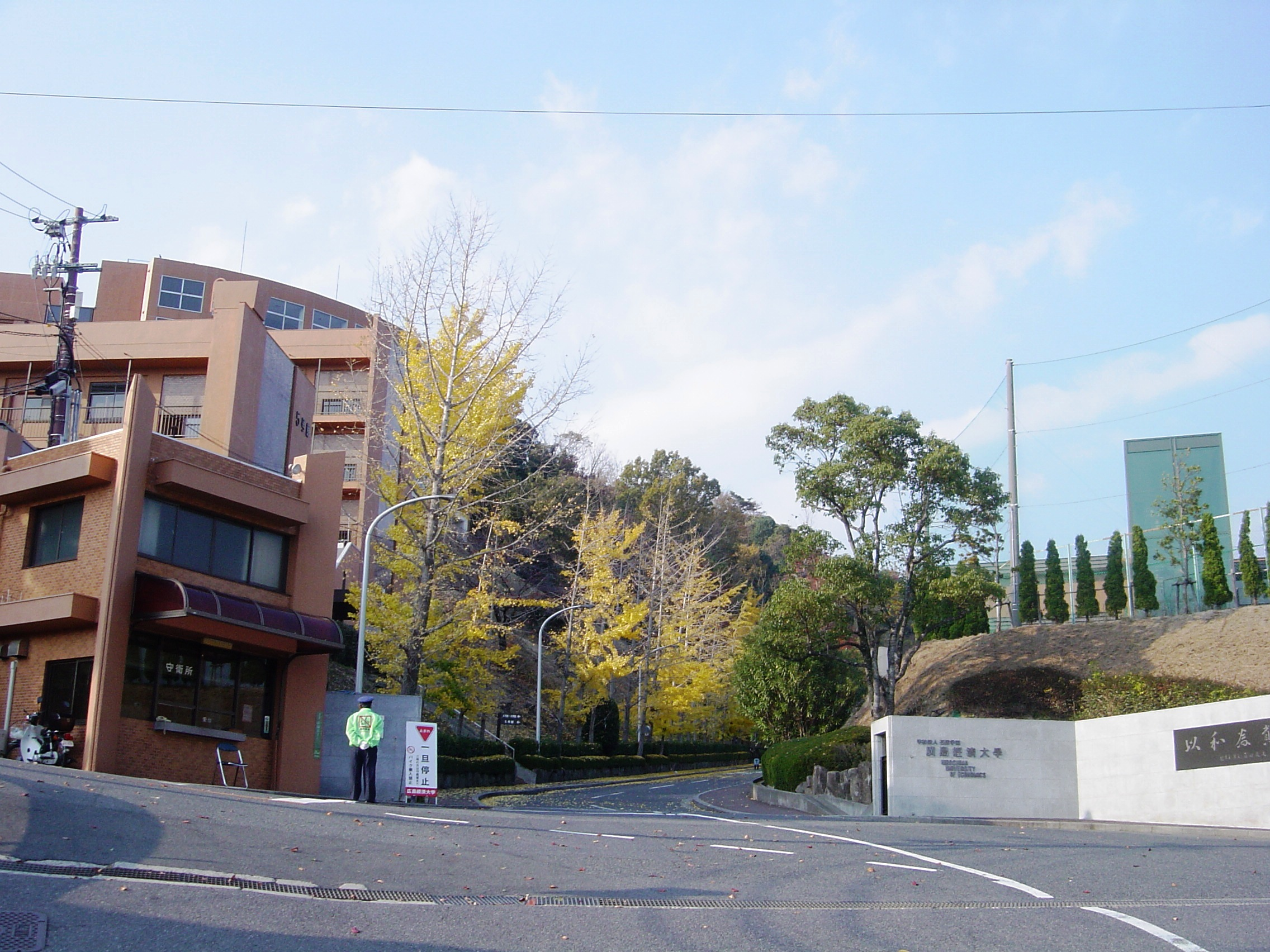
- Type: Private
- Established: 1967
- Location: Hiroshima city, Hiroshima Prefecture, Japan
- Website: www.hue.ac.jp

Hiroshima University of Economics (広島経済大学, Hiroshima keizai daigaku) is a private university in Hiroshima, Japan, established in 1967.

== See also ==
- FM Ham-star
