= Vertfee Yaita =

Japanese football club

Vertfee Yaita ヴェルフェ矢板
- Full name: Vertfee Yaita
- Nickname: Vertfee
- Founded: 1978; 47 years ago
- Stadium: Yaita City Sports Park Stadium; Yaita, Tochigi
- Capacity: 5,000
- Chairman: Takayoshi Ohmori
- Manager: Keisuke Minowa
- League: Kantō Soccer League (Div. 2)
- 2024: Kanto Div. 1, 10th of 10 (relegated)
- Website: vertfee.com
Home colours	Away colours

Vertfee Yaita (ヴェルフェ矢板, Verufe Yaita) is a Japanese football club from Yaita, Tochigi Prefecture. They set to play in the second division of Kantō Soccer League, part of Japanese Regional Leagues from 2025 after relegation from Division 1.

== History ==
The team was founded in 1978.

The club name "Vertfee" is a combination of two words which mean "green" (Vert) and "fairy" (fee) in French.

== Stadium ==
- Yaita Sports Park Athletic Stadium (Midorishin Stadium, Yaita)
- Tochigi Football Center (Lean Village, Yaita)

== Current squad ==
Updated to 23 August 2023.

Note: Flags indicate national team as defined under FIFA eligibility rules; some limited exceptions apply. Players may hold more than one non-FIFA nationality.

No.	Pos.	Nation	Player
3	DF	JPN	Takuya Uesawa
4	MF	JPN	Ryusei Fujita
5	MF	JPN	Yuto Kashibuchi
6	MF	JPN	Naoki Akiya
7	MF	JPN	Ren Akazawa
8	MF	JPN	Naoto Tokoi
9	FW	JPN	Shuto Kamimura
10	MF	JPN	Taiga Kanzaki
11	MF	JPN	Satoshi Seki
13	MF	JPN	Ryosuke Watanabe
14	FW	JPN	Brandon Goda
15	DF	JPN	Toshiki Masubuchi
16	DF	JPN	Wataru Tomioka
17	FW	JPN	Taiga Utsumi

No.	Pos.	Nation	Player
18	MF	JPN	Taisei Kimura
19	MF	JPN	Shunki Muroi
20	DF	JPN	Sora Hiraoka
21	GK	JPN	Kohei Hoshi
22	DF	JPN	Yusei Iwata
23	MF	JPN	Tatsuya Murakami
24	MF	JPN	Yuji Ono
25	DF	JPN	Hayato Ikeda
27	MF	JPN	Hideyuki Ochi
29	DF	JPN	Yusho Ishikawa
30	MF	JPN	Takuya Kokubo
33	DF	JPN	Seiya Kato
34	GK	JPN	Naoto Nagashima
36	MF	JPN	Ryotaro Kawashima

== Coaching staff ==
For the 2023 season.

Position	Name
Manager	(Japan) Keisuke Minowa
Assistant manager	(Japan) Nobuhisa Kobayashi
Goalkeeper coach	(Japan) Seiji Shishido
Competent	(Japan) Shun Kazama
Trainer	(Japan) Tatsuya Igawa (Japan) Chiaki Matsumoto (Japan) Ayumu Endo (Japan) Shinya Akiyama (Japan) Sota Akutsu

== League record ==
Champions	Runners-up	Third place	Promoted	Relegated

Season	League	Tier	Position	P	W	D	L	F	A	GD	Pts
2008	Kanto Soccer League (Div. 2)	6	3rd	14	8	1	5	26	15	11	25
2009	Kanto Soccer League (Div. 2)	6	1st	14	12	1	1	37	15	22	37
2010	Kanto Soccer League (Div. 1)	5	4th	14	6	2	6	20	20	0	20
2011	Kanto Soccer League (Div. 1)	5	6th	14	5	2	7	21	29	-8	17
2012	Kanto Soccer League (Div. 1)	5	3rd	18	8	5	5	27	20	7	29
2013	Kanto Soccer League (Div. 1)	5	2nd	18	11	5	2	32	17	15	38
2014	Kanto Soccer League (Div. 1)	5	6th	18	6	7	5	25	24	1	25
2015	Kanto Soccer League (Div. 1)	5	6th	18	5	5	8	26	23	-3	20
2016	Kanto Soccer League (Div. 1)	5	4th	18	8	4	6	23	23	0	28
2017	Kanto Soccer League (Div. 1)	5	5th	18	8	3	7	29	23	6	27
2018	Kanto Soccer League (Div. 1)	5	9th	18	3	3	12	17	33	-16	12
2019	Kanto Soccer League (Div. 2)	6	8th	18	4	6	8	18	24	-6	18
2020	Tochigi Prefectural League	7	3rd	6	4	0	2	22	9	13	12
2021	Tochigi Prefectural League	7	1st	9	9	0	0	43	0	43	27
2022	Kanto Soccer League (Div. 2)	6	9th	18	3	7	8	16	23	-7	16
2023	Kanto Soccer League (Div. 2)	6	2nd	18	12	1	5	30	24	6	37
2024	Kanto Soccer League (Div. 1)	5	10th	18	4	1	13	13	39	-26	13
2025	Kanto Soccer League (Div. 2)	6	7th	18	4	5	9	13	21	-8	17
2026	Kanto Soccer League (Div. 2)	6	TBD	18	0	0	0	0	0	0	0

Key

- Pos. = Position in league; P = Games played; W = Games won; D = Games drawn; L = Games lost; F = Goals scored; A = Goals conceded; GD = Goals difference; Pts = Points gained

== Honours ==
Vertfee Yaita Honours
Honour	No.	Years
Tochigi Prefecture 2nd Division B	1	1987
Tochigi Prefectural League	6	1991, 1995, 1997, 2000, 2001, 2021
Kanto Soccer League (Div. 2)	1	2009
Tochigi Prefecture Soccer Championship Emperor's Cup Tochigi Prefecture Qualifiers	3	2009, 2012, 2022
