= Vonds Ichihara FC =

Japanese football club

Vonds Ichihara ボンズ市原
- Full name: Vonds Ichihara Football Club
- Founded: 1967; 59 years ago; as Furukawa Electric Chiba SC
- Ground: ZA Oripri Stadium; Ichihara, Chiba
- Capacity: 14,051
- Chairman: VONDS Co., Ltd. Ichihara
- Manager: Seiya Mukoyama
- League: Japan Football League
- 2025: Kantō Soccer League, 4th of 10; JRFCL, 2nd of 4 (promoted via play-offs)
- Website: vonds.net
Home colours	Away colours

Vonds Ichihara Football Club (ボンズ市原フットボールクラブ, Bonzu Ichihara Futtobōru Kurabu), also known as Vonds Ichihara FC (ボンズ市原FC, Bonzu Ichihara Efushi) is a Japanese football club based in Ichihara, Chiba. The club set to play in Japan Football League from 2026 to 2027, the fourth tier of Japanese football after promotion from Kantō Soccer League Division 1 in 2025.

== History ==
Founded in 1967, the club was tied with Furukawa Electric Company. In 1986, they had a moment of glory by winning the 22nd Shakaijin Cup.

After changing the name in 2008 to SAI Ichihara Football Club, it was again renamed in 2011 to Vonds Ichihara Football Club. The name "Vonds" came from the word "bond" in English, changing though the initial letter to "V", which is a link to victory. The club is aiming to become a Japan Football League member and reaching professional football from there, as former parent club JEF United Ichihara Chiba is no longer considered to represent Ichihara.

On 30 November 2025, Vonds Ichihara secured promotion to the Japan Football League for the first time in their history, starting next season, after narrowly defeating Atletico Suzuka 1–0 with a goal from Yuji Kato in the 98th minute of the promotion-relegation play-off, following their 2nd-place finish in the 2025 Japanese Regional Football Champions League.

== Stadium ==
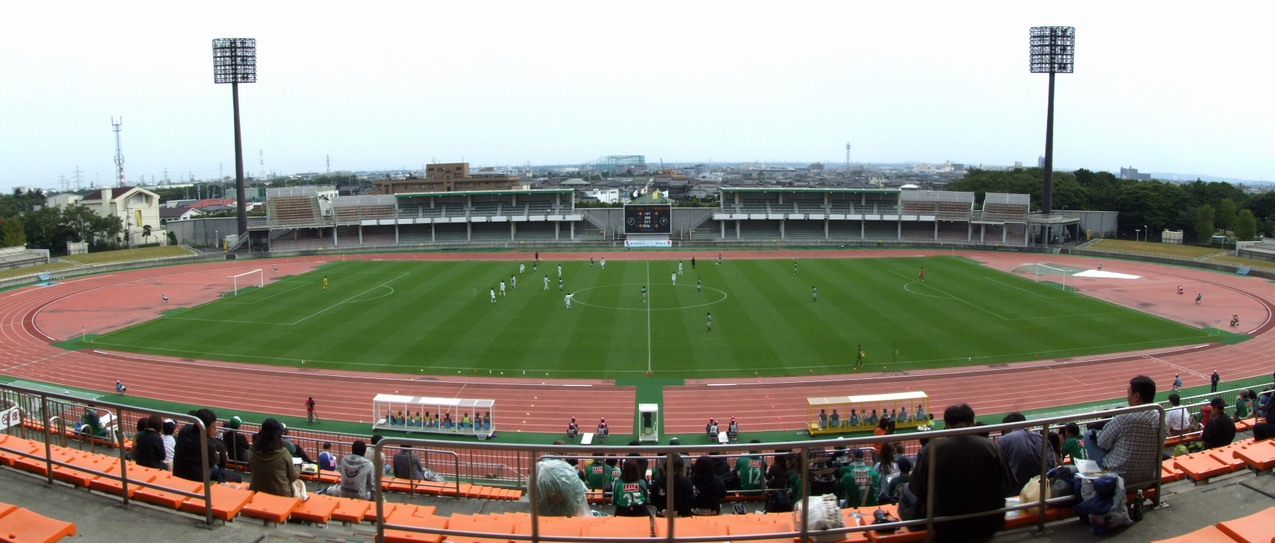

Most of the club matches are played Ichihara Seaside Stadium (currently known as ZA Oripri Stadium due sponsorship) which has a capacity of 14,051.

== Changes in club name ==
- 1967–2008: Furukawa Electric Chiba SC
- 2008–2010: SAI Ichihara Football Club
- 2011–present: Vonds Ichihara Football Club

== League record ==
Champions	Runners-up	Third place	Promoted	Relegated

League											Emperor's Cup	Shakaijin Cup
Season	League	Pos	P	W	D	L	F	A	GD	Pts	Emperor's Cup	Shakaijin Cup
2011	Chiba Prefectural League (Div. 1)	4th	13	8	2	3	41	25	16	26	Did not qualify	
2012	Chiba Prefectural League (Div. 1)	1st	13	12	0	1	50	13	37	36	Did not qualify	
2013	Kantō Soccer League (Div. 2)	2nd	18	12	0	6	45	20	25	36	Did not qualify	Round of 16
2014	Kantō Soccer League (Div. 1)	3rd	18	8	6	4	37	27	10	30	Did not qualify	3rd
2015	Kantō Soccer League (Div. 1)	2nd	18	12	2	4	35	22	13	38	Did not qualify	1st round
2016	Kantō Soccer League (Div. 1)	2nd	18	11	3	4	40	14	26	36	1st round	Round of 16
2017	Kantō Soccer League (Div. 1)	1st	18	13	3	2	44	18	26	42	Did not qualify	3rd
2018	Kantō Soccer League (Div. 1)	2nd	18	12	2	4	48	20	28	38	2nd round	Round of 16
2019	Kantō Soccer League (Div. 1)	1st	18	15	1	2	40	12	28	41	Did not qualify	Round of 16
2020 †	Kantō Soccer League (Div. 1)	4th	9	5	2	2	15	7	8	17	2nd round	‡
2021	Kantō Soccer League (Div. 1)	3rd	22	14	3	5	40	15	25	45	Did not qualify	‡
2022	Kantō Soccer League (Div. 1)	4th	18	8	5	5	22	20	2	29	Did not qualify	Round of 16
2023	Kantō Soccer League (Div. 1)	1st	18	15	1	2	30	8	22	46	Did not qualify	Round of 32
2024	Kantō Soccer League (Div. 1)	1st	18	14	4	0	28	8	20	46	Did not qualify	Round of 32
2025	Kantō Soccer League (Div. 1)	4th	18	9	3	6	19	17	2	30	Did not qualify	3rd
2026–27	Japan Football League	TBD	30									Ineligible

Key

- Pos. = Position in league; P = Games played; W = Games won; D = Games drawn; L = Games lost; F = Goals for; A = Goals against; GD = Goal difference; Pts = Points gained
- † Number of games played reduced by COVID-19 worldwide pandemic
- ‡ Competition cancelled due to COVID-19 pandemic in Japan

== Honours ==
Vonds Ichihara honours
Honour	No.	Years
All Japan Shakaijin Cup	1	1987
Chiba Prefecture Adult Soccer League Division 1	1	2012
Chiba Prefectural Football Championship	3	2016, 2018, 2020
KSL Ichihara Cup	1	2016
Kantō Soccer League	4	2017, 2019, 2023, 2024
JFL/Regional Leagues Promotion-Relegation Play-off Winner	1	2025

== Current squad ==
Updated to 14 February 2025. Note: Flags indicate national team as defined under FIFA eligibility rules; some limited exceptions apply. Players may hold more than one non-FIFA nationality.

No.	Pos.	Nation	Player
1	GK	JPN	Teruki Origuchi
2	DF	JPN	Tomoki Fujisaki
3	DF	JPN	Kazuki Yoshida
4	MF	JPN	Hiroto Nakazawa
5	DF	JPN	Kodai Watanabe
6	MF	JPN	Tomoki Taniguchi
7	MF	JPN	Shohei Kiyohara
8	DF	JPN	Yuji Kato
9	FW	JPN	Toshiyasu Motoyoshi
10	MF	JPN	Daiki Numa
11	FW	JPN	Ryuichi Ichiki
13	MF	JPN	Kazuki Arinaga
14	FW	JPN	Kazuki Kijima
15	MF	JPN	Taisuke Mizuno
16	FW	JPN	Taro Katsuura

No.	Pos.	Nation	Player
17	FW	JPN	Rikiya Yoshida
18	MF	JPN	Haruto Sakuraba
19	MF	JPN	Jo Hashimoto
20	DF	JPN	Kenta Goto
21	GK	JPN	Masaki Imagawa
22	DF	JPN	Hayato Nishinoue
23	FW	JPN	Junya Goto
24	MF	JPN	Jonosuke Kiriishi
27	GK	JPN	Yuya Gunji
29	MF	JPN	Chihiro Otomo
32	MF	JPN	Sota Tanakaa
33	DF	JPN	Eiji Suto
36	FW	JPN	Ritsuki Uemoto
