= 2020 Emperor's Cup =

Tournament details
- Country: Japan
- Dates: 16 September 2020 – 1 January 2021
- Teams: 52

Final positions
- Champions: Kawasaki Frontale (1st title)
- Runners-up: Gamba Osaka

The 2020 Emperor's Cup (Emperor's Cup JFA 100th Japan Football Championship (Japanese: 天皇杯 JFA 第100回全日本サッカー選手権大会)) was the 100th edition of the annual Japanese national football cup tournament. The tournament, originally scheduled to begin on 23 May, was rescheduled to begin on 16 September and ended with the final on 1 January 2021 at the National Stadium.

The number of teams was reduced to 50 as a result of the COVID-19 pandemic in Japan, and subsequently changed to 52 teams. Both the champions of the 2020 J2 League and the 2020 J3 League entered at the quarter-finals. The top two teams from the 2020 J1 League entered at the semi-finals.

The defending champions were Vissel Kobe but they were unable to defend the title as they failed to qualify through the top two of the 2020 J1 League.

The J1 League champions Kawasaki Frontale completed the double by beating the league's runners-up Gamba Osaka in the final, earning their first Emperor's Cup title.

== Calendar ==
The revised schedule was announced on 18 June 2020.

Round	Date	Matches	Clubs	New entries this round
First Round	16 September	16	32 → 16	32 prefectural cup winners
Second Round	23–30 September	16	16+15+1 → 16	15 prefectural cup winners; 1 Amateur Best Team
Third Round	28 October – 11 November	8	16 → 8	
Fourth Round	13 December	4	8 → 4	
Fifth Round	20 December	2	4 → 2	
Quarter-finals	23 December	2	2+2 → 2	2020 J2 champions club; 2020 J3 champions club
Semi-finals	27 December	2	2+2 → 2	2020 J1 Top two clubs
Final	1 January 2021	1	2 → 1	

== Regional allocation ==
JFA decided that 48 amateur teams would be split into 8 regions, and each region would be represented by 1 team in the Fourth Round. 8 regions were based on 9 regional football associations in Japan (Hokkaido & Tohoku would be merged into a single region).

- Kantō (all 8 prefectural representative teams participate from First Round);
- Kyushu (all 8 prefectural representative teams participate from First Round);
- Hokushinetsu (5 prefectural representative teams, with 3 teams participate from Second Round and 2 teams participate from First Round);
- Tōkai (4 prefectural representative teams plus Honda FC, with 3 teams participate from Second Round and 2 teams participate from First Round);
- Chūgoku (5 prefectural representative teams, with 3 teams participate from Second Round and 2 teams participate from First Round);
- Hokkaido & Tohoku (7 prefectural representative teams, with 1 team participate from Second Round and 6 teams participate from First Round);
- Shikoku (all 4 prefectural representative teams participate from Second Round);
- Kansai (6 prefectural representative teams, with 2 teams participate from Second Round and 4 teams participate from First Round);

== Participating clubs ==
52 clubs will compete in the tournament.

2020 J1 League top two clubs	2020 J2 League, 2020 J3 League champions clubs	Amateur Best Team	47 prefectural tournament winners	
Kawasaki Frontale; Gamba Osaka	Tokushima Vortis; Blaublitz Akita	Honda FC	Hokkaido: Sapporo University; Aomori: ReinMeer Aomori; Iwate: Fuji University; Miyagi: Sony Sendai FC; Akita: Saruta Kogyo; Yamagata: Oyama SC; Fukushima: Iwaki FC; Ibaraki: University of Tsukuba; Tochigi: Tochigi City; Gunma: Tonan Maebashi; Saitama: Tokyo International University; Chiba: Vonds Ichihara; Tokyo: Tokyo Musashino City FC; Kanagawa: Toin University of Yokohama; Yamanashi: Yamanashi Gakuin University Pegasus; Nagano: Artista Asama; Niigata: Niigata University of Health and Welfare; Toyama: Toyama Shinjo Club; Ishikawa: Kanazawa Seiryo University; Fukui: Fukui United; Shizuoka: Tokoha University; Aichi: FC Maruyasu Okazaki; Mie: Suzuka Point Getters; Gifu: Nagara Club	Shiga: MIO Biwako Shiga; Kyoto: Ococias Kyoto AC; Osaka: FC Tiamo Hirakata; Hyōgo: Cento Cuore Harima FC; Nara: Nara Club; Wakayama: Arterivo Wakayama; Tottori: Yonago Genki SC; Shimane: Matsue City FC; Okayama: Mitsubishi Mizushima FC; Hiroshima: Fukuyama City FC; Yamaguchi: FC Baleine Shimonoseki; Kagawa: Takamatsu University; Tokushima: FC Tokushima; Ehime: Matsuyama University; Kōchi: Kochi United; Fukuoka: Fukuoka University; Saga: EV Internacional; Nagasaki: MD Nagasaki; Kumamoto: Kumamoto Teachers SC; Ōita: Verspah Oita; Miyazaki: Tegevajaro Miyazaki; Kagoshima: National Institute of Fitness and Sports in Kanoya; Okinawa: Okinawa SV

== Bracket ==
Source:Tournament table (Official website in Japanese)

=== Hokkaido & Tohoku Regions ===
First Round
Sony Sendai FC	3
Saruta Kogyo	0
Iwaki FC	4
Oyama SC	0
ReinMeer Aomori	2
Sapporo University	1

Second Round
Fuji University	3
Sony Sendai FC	2
Iwaki FC	0
ReinMeer Aomori	3

Third Round
Fuji University	1
ReinMeer Aomori	2

=== Kantō Region ===
First Round
University of Tsukuba	2
Tokyo International University	0
Toin University of Yokohama	4
Yamanashi Gakuin University	2
Tonan Maebashi	2
Vonds Ichihara	3
Tokyo Musashino City FC (p)	3 (5)
Tochigi City FC	3 (4)

Second Round
University of Tsukuba	4
Toin University of Yokohama	3
Vonds Ichihara	2
Tokyo Musashino City FC	3

Third Round
University of Tsukuba	3
Tokyo Musashino City FC	2

=== Hokushinetsu Region ===
First Round
Kanazawa Seiryo University	1
Toyama Shinjo	2

Second Round
Fukui United FC	2
Toyama Shinjo	1
Niigata University of Health and Welfare	3
Artista Asama	0

Third Round
Fukui United FC	2
Niigata University of Health and Welfare	0

=== Tōkai Region ===
First Round
FC Maruyasu Okazaki	3
Suzuka Point Getters	2

Second Round
Nagara Club	0
FC Maruyasu Okazaki	4
Honda FC	2
Tokoha University	1

Third Round
FC Maruyasu Okazaki	0
Honda FC	1

=== Kansai Region ===
First Round
Cento Cuore Harima	1 (2)
MIO Biwako Shiga(p)	1 (4)
Ococias Kyoto AC	0
Nara Club	1

Second Round
Arterivo Wakayama	1
MIO Biwako Shiga	0
FC Tiamo Hirakata	1
Nara Club	0

Third Round
Arterivo Wakayama	3
FC Tiamo Hirakata	2

=== Chūgoku Region ===
First Round
Yonago Genki SC	0
Matsue City FC	5

Second Round
Mitsubishi Mizushima FC (a.e.t.)	1
Matsue City FC	0
Fukuyama City FC	1
FC Baleine Shimonoseki	0

Third Round
Mitsubishi Mizushima FC	0
Fukuyama City FC	2

=== Shikoku Region ===
Second Round
Kochi United SC	2
Takamatsu University	1
FC Tokushima	5
Matsuyama University	0

Third Round
Kochi United SC	2
FC Tokushima	1

=== Kyushu Region ===
First Round
Kumamoto Teachers	0 (1)
Fukuoka University (p)	0 (3)
NIFS Kanoya	1
Okinawa SV	0
EV Internacional	0
MD Nagasaki	4
Verspah Oita (p)	2 (5)
Tegevajaro Miyazaki	2 (4)

Second Round
Fukuoka University	1
NIFS Kanoya	4
MD Nagasaki	0
Verspah Oita	2

Third Round
NIFS Kanoya	1
Verspah Oita	2

=== Fourth & Fifth Round ===
Fourth Round; 13 December
Fukui United FC (a.e.t.)	2
ReinMeer Aomori	1
Fukuyama City FC	2
Arterivo Wakayama	1
Verspah Oita	0
Honda FC	1
University of Tsukuba	3
Kochi United SC	2

Fifth Round; 20 December
Fukui United FC	0
Fukuyama City FC	3
Honda FC	2
University of Tsukuba	1

=== Finals ===
Quarter-finals
J3	Blaublitz Akita	3
FR	Fukuyama City FC	1
J2	Tokushima Vortis	3
FR	Honda FC	0

Semi-finals
J1	Kawasaki Frontale	2
J3	Blaublitz Akita	0
J1	Gamba Osaka	2
J2	Tokushima Vortis	0

Final
J1	Kawasaki Frontale	1
J1	Gamba Osaka	0

== First round ==
The draw for the first through third rounds was conducted on 29 July 2020.

=== Hokkaido & Tohoku Regions ===
16 September 2020	Sony Sendai FC	3–0	Saruta Kogyo	Sendai
19:00	Akimoto 45'; Hirata 61'; Suzuki 89'	Report		Stadium: Yurtec Stadium Sendai; Attendance: 203; Referee: Tomokazu Sato

16 September 2020	Iwaki FC	4–0	Oyama SC	Fukushima
15:00	Matsumoto 29'; Tanimura 60'; Takizawa 77'; Hiraoka 90'	Report		Stadium: J-Village Stadium; Attendance: 0 Referee: Takeshi Tsukahara

16 September 2020	ReinMeer Aomori	2–1	Sapporo University	Hachinohe
13:00	Sakakibara 70'; Hamada 88'	Report	Mukai 18'	Stadium: Prifoods Stadium; Attendance: 130; Referee: Kentaro Uematsu

=== Kantō Region ===
16 September 2020	University of Tsukuba	2–0	Tokyo International University	Hitachinaka
19:00	Kato 57'; Yamahara 87'	Report		Stadium: Hitachinaka City Stadium; Attendance: 299; Referee: Yoshimi Yamashita

16 September 2020	Toin University of Yokohama	4–2	Yamanashi Gakuin University	Hiratsuka
19:00	Teranuma 7'; Endo 71'; Yamada 86'; Nakano 90+1'	Report	Higuchi 67'; Hayasaka 90+3'	Stadium: Shonan BMW Stadium Hiratsuka; Attendance: 246; Referee: Tomoyuki Umeda

16 September 2020	Tonan Maebashi	2–3	Vonds Ichihara	Maebashi
14:00	Nukaga 50', 79'	Report	Ukai 58'; Ikeda 81', 87'	Stadium: Earth Care Gunma Shikishima Football Stadium; Attendance: 0 Referee: Yusuke Ohashi

16 September 2020	Tokyo Musashino City FC	3–3 (a.e.t.) (5–4 p)	Tochigi City FC	Kita
16:00	Taguchi (88); Ishihara 90+1'	Report	Uchida 60'; Nagami 73'; Yoshida 78'	Stadium: Ajinomoto Field Nishigaoka; Attendance: 0 Referee: Genki Tawara
	Penalties
	Ishihara (penalty missed); Taguchi (penalty scored); Sashinami (penalty scored); Kobayashi (penalty scored); Ko Kyung-te (penalty scored); Nakagawa (penalty scored)		(penalty scored) Suzuki; (penalty scored) Tanaka; (penalty scored) Uchida; (penalty missed) Okaniwa; (penalty scored) Nagami; (penalty missed) Okamoto

=== Hokushinetsu Region ===
16 September 2020	Kanazawa Seiryo University	1–2	Toyama Shinjo	Kanazawa
15:00	Yamazaki 25'	Report	Yamada 67'; Hosoki 90'	Stadium: Kanazawa Stadium; Attendance: 0 Referee: Naoto Uehara

=== Tōkai Region ===
16 September 2020	FC Maruyasu Okazaki	3–2	Suzuka Point Getters	Nagoya
19:00	Hirai 7'; Funatani 29', 64'	Report	Wada 24'; Endo 88'	Stadium: Paloma Mizuho Stadium; Attendance: 448; Referee: Takuya Ujihara

=== Kansai Region ===
16 September 2020	Cento Cuore Harima	1–1 (a.e.t.) (2–4 p)	MIO Biwako Shiga	Miki
18:00	Uemura 102'	Report	Yoshiba 120+1'	Stadium: Miki Athletic Stadium; Attendance: 165; Referee: Hiroki Murata
	Penalties
	Saho (penalty missed); Fushiki (penalty scored); Shinohara (penalty scored); Katsuyama (penalty missed)		(penalty scored) Kamo; (penalty scored) Matsuda; (penalty scored) Shinagawa; (penalty missed) Kubo; (penalty scored) Sugaya

16 September 2020	Ococias Kyoto AC	0–1	Nara Club	Uji
15:00		Report	Hayasaka 90'	Stadium: Yamashiro Sports Park; Attendance: 252; Referee: Yasuyuki Matsumoto

=== Chūgoku Region ===
16 September 2020	Yonago Genki SC	0–5	Matsue City FC	Tottori
19:00		Report	Nakai 2', 47'; Kitahara 15', 84'; Sato 37'	Stadium: Axis Bird Stadium; Attendance: 315; Referee: Kakuro Hori

=== Kyushu Region ===
16 September 2020	Kumamoto Teachers	0–0 (a.e.t.) (1–3 p)	Fukuoka University	Kumamoto
19:00		Report		Stadium: Egao Kenko Stadium

16 September 2020	NIFS Kanoya	1–0	Okinawa SV	Kirishima
17:00	Kihashi 23'	Report		Stadium: Kokubu Sports Park Multipurpose Field; Attendance: 189; Referee: Yuichi Hanakawa

16 September 2020	EV Internacional	0–4	MD Nagasaki	Saga
19:00		Report	Nakano 7'; Omote 17'; Mizugashira 49'; Fukamachi 77'	Stadium: Saga Sunrise Park Ball Game Field; Attendance: 237; Referee: Kazuya Miyahara

16 September 2020	Verspah Oita	2–2 (a.e.t.) (5–4 p)	Tegevajaro Miyazaki	Oita
19:00	Yabuuchi 16'; Urashima 83'	Report	Umeda 9', 18'	Stadium: Showa Denko Dome Oita; Attendance: 335; Referee: Shinya Sasaki
	Penalties
	Shinohara (penalty missed); Urashima (penalty scored); Maeda (penalty scored); Nishinoue (penalty missed); Uryu (penalty scored); Fukumoto (penalty scored); Nakano (penalty scored)		(penalty scored) Saanumi; (penalty scored) Tokunaga; (penalty missed) Okuma; (penalty missed) Aoyama; (penalty scored) Ueda; (penalty scored) Watahiki; (penalty missed) Ohata

== Second round ==
=== Hokkaido & Tohoku Regions ===
23 September 2020	Fuji University	3–2	Sony Sendai FC	Sendai
19:00	Yachi 35'; Own goal 62' (o.g.); Abe 67'	Report	Fujiwara 83', 87'	Stadium: Q&A Stadium Miyagi; Attendance: 239; Referee: Taku Nagaya

23 September 2020	Iwaki FC	0–3	ReinMeer Aomori	Iwaki
15:00		Report	Wada 18', 79'; Nitta 89'	Stadium: J-Village Stadium; Attendance: 0 Referee: Masakazu Kato

=== Kantō Region ===
23 September 2020	University of Tsukuba	4–3	Toin University of Yokohama	Hitachinaka
19:00	Miura 3'; Mori 18'; Wada 77'; Igawa 81'	Report	Kagami 20', 51'; Matsumoto 35'	Stadium: Hitachinaka City Stadium; Attendance: 274; Referee: Yasuhiro Udagawa

23 September 2020	Vonds Ichihara	2–3 (a.e.t.)	Tokyo Musashino City FC	Ichihara
17:00	Mine 105'; Saitai 119'	Report	Ishihara 98'; Nakagawa 109'; Taguchi 111'	Stadium: ZA Oripri Stadium; Attendance: 0 Referee: Masashi Harada

=== Hokushin'etsu Region ===
23 September 2020	Niigata University HW	3–0	Artista Asama	Shibata
17:00	Arita 75', 83'; Tanaka 84'	Report		Stadium: Green Stadium Shibata; Attendance: 220; Referee: Tomokazu Sato

23 September 2020	Fukui United FC	2–1 (a.e.t.)	Toyama Shinjo	Sakai
19:00	Yamada 86'; Okuno 116'	Report	Hosoki 52'	Stadium: Technoport Fukui Stadium; Attendance: 263; Referee: Yoshikazu Matsuzawa

=== Tōkai Region ===
23 September 2020	Honda FC	2–1	Tokoha University	Fukuroi
19:00	Omachi 14', 26'	Report	Yamashita 90+2'	Stadium: Ecopa Stadium; Attendance: 879; Referee: Yasuyuki Matsumoto

23 September 2020	Nagara Club	0–4	FC Maruyasu Okazaki	Gifu
19:00		Report	Inukai 14', 43'; Tsuda 40'; Terao 72'	Stadium: Gifu Nagaragawa Meadow; Attendance: 459; Referee: Yusuke Ohashi

=== Kansai Region ===
23 September 2020	Arterivo Wakayama	1–0	MIO Biwako Shiga	Wakayama
18:15	Okita 27'	Report		Stadium: Kimiidera Athletic Stadium; Attendance: 393; Referee: Yuichi Hanakawa

23 September 2020	FC Tiamo Hirakata	1–0	Nara Club	Osaka
19:00	Kato 11'	Report		Stadium: Yanmar Stadium Nagai; Attendance: 507; Referee: Yuzo Sutani

=== Chūgoku Region ===
30 September 2020	Fukuyama City FC	1–0	FC Baleine Shimonoseki	Hiroshima
16:00	Taguchi 25'	Report		Stadium: Hiroshima Regional Park No.1 Football Stadium; Attendance: 140; Referee: Kakuro Hori

23 September 2020	Mitsubishi Mizushima FC	1–0 (a.e.t.)	Matsue City FC	Miyoshi
14:00	Nakagawa 104'	Report		Stadium: Miyoshi Sports Park Athletics Stadium; Attendance: 60; Referee: Takuya Yokoyama

=== Shikoku Region ===
23 September 2020	Kochi United SC	2–1	Takamatsu University	Kochi
19:00	Akahoshi 37'; Izumi 90+4'	Report	Yamauchi 81'	Stadium: Kochi Haruno Athletic Stadium; Attendance: 325; Referee: Satoshi Michiyama

23 September 2020	FC Tokushima	5–0	Matsuyama University	Kochi
16:00	Nakabayashi 12', 90+2'; Matsumoto 40', 83'; Hiroi 57'	Report		Stadium: Kochi Haruno Athletic Stadium; Attendance: 101; Referee: Toshiki Tomomasa

=== Kyushu Region ===
23 September 2020	Fukuoka University	1–4 (a.e.t.)	NIFS Kanoya	Kirishima
17:00	Imada 45+2'	Report	Igarashi 30'; Nemoto 94'; Sato 111'; Morishige 120+1'	Stadium: Kokubu Track & Field Stadium; Attendance: 431; Referee: Yoshihito Hori

23 September 2020	MD Nagasaki	0–2	Verspah Oita	Isahaya
19:00		Report	Fukushima 45+2'; Own goal 53' (o.g.)	Stadium: Transcosmos Stadium Nagasaki; Attendance: 446; Referee: Yoshimi Yamashita

== Third round ==
=== Hokkaido & Tohoku Regions ===
28 October 2020	Fuji University	1–2	ReinMeer Aomori	Sendai
19:00	Yachi 61'	Report	Yamada 10'; Hori 17'	Stadium: Q&A Stadium Miyagi; Attendance: 163; Referee: Taku Nagaya

=== Kantō Region ===
28 October 2020	University of Tsukuba	3–2 (a.e.t.)	Tokyo Musashino City	Mito
19:00	Shoji 84'; Kobayashi 103'; Miura 120+1'	Report	Suzuki 49'; Goto 97'	Stadium: K's denki Stadium Mito; Attendance: 453; Referee: Takuya Ujihara

=== Hokushinetsu Region ===
28 October 2020	Niigata University HW	0–2	Fukui United FC	Sakai
18:00	Ishizuka 34'; Fukuda 48'	Report		Stadium: Technoport Fukui Stadium; Attendance: 230; Referee: Masakazu Kato

=== Tōkai Region ===
28 October 2020	Honda FC	1–0	FC Maruyasu Okazaki	Fukuroi
16:00	Okazaki 80'	Report		Stadium: Ecopa Stadium; Attendance: 521; Referee: Yusuke Ohashi

=== Kansai Region ===
28 October 2020	Arterivo Wakayama	3–2 (a.e.t.)	FC Tiamo Hirakata	Osaka
19:00	Higuchi 68' (o.g.); Yamamoto 70'; Hayashi 109'	Report	Cho Young-cheol 42'; Kida 53'	Stadium: Nagai Stadium; Attendance: 785; Referee: Yasuyuki Matsumoto

=== Chūgoku Region ===
28 October 2020	Fukuyama City	2–0	Mitsubishi Mizushima	Miyoshi
13:00	Taguchi 5'; Ito 90'	Report		Stadium: Miyoshi Sports Park Athletics Stadium; Attendance: 275; Referee: Takuya Yokoyama

=== Shikoku Region ===
11 November 2020	Kochi United SC	2–1	FC Tokushima	Marugame
19:00	Taguchi 45+1'; Nagao 76'	Report	Matsumoto 7'	Stadium: Pikara Stadium; Attendance: 202; Referee: Yoshihito Hori

=== Kyushu Region ===
28 October 2020	NIFS Kanoya	1–2	Verspah Oita	Kumamoto
19:00	Ito 90+2'	Report	Maeda 52'; Miyauchi 62'	Stadium: Egao Kenko Stadium; Attendance: 191; Referee: Kazuya Miyahara

== Fourth round ==
13 December 2020	Fukui United FC	2–1 (a.e.t.)	ReinMeer Aomori	Sakai
13:00	Noda 3'; Ishizuka 107'	Report	Shindo 47'	Stadium: Technoport Fukui Stadium; Attendance: 344; Referee: Ryosuke Yamaoka

13 December 2020	Fukuyama City FC	2–1	Arterivo Wakayama	Hiroshima
14:00	Takayama 33'; Takahashi 48' (pen.)	Report	Hayashi 90'	Stadium: Hiroshima Regional Park No.1 Football Stadium; Attendance: 596; Referee: Toru Kakinuma

13 December 2020	Verspah Oita	0–1	Honda FC	Oita
13:00		Report	Tomita 14'	Stadium: Oita Athletic Stadium; Attendance: 502; Referee: Tetsuro Yoshida

13 December 2020	University of Tsukuba	3–2 (a.e.t.)	Kochi United SC	Kashima
19:00	Shimodo 50'; Mori 90+6'; Shoji 108'	Report	Akahoshi 47', 70'	Stadium: Kashima Soccer Stadium; Attendance: 552; Referee: Hiromichi Oka

== Fifth round ==
Venues for the fifth round through the semi-finals were only announced on 10 December, as the venues would be decided based on the qualified teams for the round.

20 December 2020	Fukui United FC	0–3	Fukuyama City FC	Hiroshima
13:00		Report	Taguchi 16' (pen.), 65'; Tanaka 34'	Stadium: Hiroshima Park First Football Stadium; Attendance: 391; Referee: Ryo Tanimoto

20 December 2020	Honda FC	2–1	University of Tsukuba	Fukuroi
18:00	Ishida 64'; Sasaki 90+1'	Report	Sera 22'	Stadium: ECOPA Stadium; Attendance: 767; Referee: Hayato Shimizu

== Quarter-finals ==
23 December 2020	Blaublitz Akita	3–1	Fukuyama City FC	Sendai
19:00	Shige 15'; Hisatomi 45+1'; Eguchi 89'	Report	Yoshii 41'	Stadium: Yurtec Stadium Sendai; Attendance: 202; Referee: Yoshiro Imamura

23 December 2020	Tokushima Vortis	3–0	Honda FC	Kobe
19:00	Suzuki 42', 50'; Iwao 59' (pen.)	Report		Stadium: Noevir Stadium Kobe; Attendance: 576; Referee: Koichiro Fukushima

== Semi-finals ==
27 December 2020	Kawasaki Frontale	2–0	Blaublitz Akita	Kawasaki
13:05	Mitoma 39'; Tanaka 83'	Report		Stadium: Kawasaki Todoroki Stadium; Attendance: 9,772; Referee: Yudai Yamamoto

27 December 2020	Gamba Osaka	2–0	Tokushima Vortis	Suita
16:00	Patric 52'; Fukuda 82'	Report		Stadium: Panasonic Stadium Suita; Attendance: 7,055; Referee: Ryuji Sato

== Final ==
1 January 2021
14:40 JST

Kawasaki Frontale	1–0	Gamba Osaka
Mitoma 55'	Report

Japan National Stadium, Shinjuku, Tokyo
Attendance: 13,318
Referee: Hiroyuki Kimura

== See also ==
- Japan Football Association (JFA)
- J.League
- 2020 J1 League (I)
- 2020 J2 League (II)
- 2020 J3 League (III)
- 2020 Japan Football League (IV)
- 2020 Japanese Regional Leagues (V/VI)
- 2020 Fuji Xerox Super Cup (Super Cup)
- 2020 Emperor's Cup (National Cup)
- 2020 J.League YBC Levain Cup (League Cup)
