= List of J3 League transfers winter 2015–16 =

This is a list of Japanese football J3 League transfers in the winter transfer window 2015–16 by club.

== Oita Trinita ==
In: Note: Flags indicate national team as defined under FIFA eligibility rules; some limited exceptions apply. Players may hold more than one non-FIFA nationality.

No.	Pos.	Nation	Player
8	MF	PRK	Hwang Song-su (from (Japan) Thespakusatsu Gunma)
14	MF	JPN	Takanori Chiaki (from (Japan) Fagiano Okayama)
15	MF	JPN	Takumi Kiyomoto (on loan from (Japan) FC Gifu)
16	MF	JPN	Satoru Yamagishi (from (Japan) Sanfrecce Hiroshima)
19	FW	JPN	Yosei Otsu (on loan from (Japan) Thespakusatsu Gunma)
23	MF	JPN	Yuki Yamanouchi (from (Japan) Giravanz Kitakyushu)
26	MF	JPN	Kazuki Igashira (promoted from youth ranks)
29	MF	JPN	Tomoki Iwata (promoted from youth ranks)
30	FW	JPN	Tsubasa Yoshihira (promoted from youth ranks)
31	GK	JPN	Kenshin Yoshimaru (on loan from (Japan) Vissel Kobe)
34	MF	JPN	Kazuki Someya (from (Japan) Fagiano Okayama)

Out: Note: Flags indicate national team as defined under FIFA eligibility rules; some limited exceptions apply. Players may hold more than one non-FIFA nationality.

No.	Pos.	Nation	Player
—	GK	JPN	Yohei Takeda (to (Japan) Nagoya Grampus)
—	GK	JPN	Daiki Kanei (loan return to (Japan) Roasso Kumamoto)
—	DF	JPN	Hironori Nishi (to (Japan) Kamatamare Sanuki)
—	DF	JPN	Akihiro Sakata (to (Japan) Nagano Parceiro)
—	DF	JPN	Masashi Wakasa (to (Japan) JEF United Chiba)
—	DF	JPN	Yu Yasukawa (to (Japan) Matsumoto Yamaga)
—	MF	JPN	Koya Kazama (to (Japan) FC Gifu, previously on loan)
—	MF	JPN	Akihiro Hyodo (to (Japan) Mito Hollyhock)
—	MF	KOR	Kim Jeong-hyun (to (South Korea) Gwangju FC)
—	FW	BRA	Evandro (to (Japan) FC Gifu)
—	FW	JPN	Hirotaka Tameda (to (Japan) Avispa Fukuoka)
—	FW	JPN	Hideya Okamoto (to (Japan) Fagiano Okayama, previously on loan)
—	FW	JPN	Tomoyuki Arata (to (Japan) Nagano Parceiro)

== Tochigi SC ==
In: Note: Flags indicate national team as defined under FIFA eligibility rules; some limited exceptions apply. Players may hold more than one non-FIFA nationality.

No.	Pos.	Nation	Player
4	DF	JPN	Kenta Hirose (on loan from (Japan) Shonan Bellmare)
6	MF	JPN	Tatsuki Kohatsu (from (Japan) Ryutsu Keizai University)
9	FW	JPN	Tsugutoshi Oishi (from (Japan) Fujieda MYFC)
11	FW	BRA	Jean Diego Moser (on loan from (Austria) UVB)
13	FW	JPN	Yosuke Kamigata (on loan from (Japan) V-Varen Nagasaki)
14	MF	JPN	Kazuki Nishiya (from (Japan) Ryutsu Keizai University)
15	DF	JPN	Takuma Nagayoshi (loan return from (Japan) SC Sagamihara)
16	MF	JPN	Daisuke Saito (from (Japan) Tokushima Vortis)
20	MF	JPN	Daiki Yamamoto (from (Japan) Gainare Tottori)
24	MF	JPN	Tatsuya Wada (from (Japan) Matsumoto Yamaga)
25	DF	JPN	Kyotaro Yamakoshi (from (Japan) Kawasaki Frontale)
35	GK	JPN	Shuhei Kawata (on loan from (Japan) Omiya Ardija)
41	MF	JPN	Hayato Sasaki (from (Japan) Kyoto Sanga)

Out: Note: Flags indicate national team as defined under FIFA eligibility rules; some limited exceptions apply. Players may hold more than one non-FIFA nationality.

No.	Pos.	Nation	Player
—	GK	JPN	Shigeru Sakurai (released)
—	DF	JPN	Kenji Arabori (to (Japan) Montedio Yamagata)
—	DF	JPN	Hiroshi Nakano (retired)
—	DF	KOR	Park Hyung-jin (loan return to (Japan) Sanfrecce Hiroshima)
—	DF	KOR	Lee Joo-young (to (Japan) JEF United Chiba)
—	DF	KOR	Han Hee-hoon (to (South Korea) Bucheon FC 1995)
—	MF	JPN	Tatsuya Onodera (to (Japan) V-Varen Nagasaki)
—	MF	BRA	Jhonatan da Silva Pereira (released)
—	MF	JPN	Yosuke Yuzawa (to (Japan) Mito Hollyhock)
—	MF	JPN	Keiya Nakami (to (Japan) Sagan Tosu)
—	MF	JPN	Ryo Matsumura (loan return to (Japan) Vissel Kobe)
—	FW	JPN	Toyofumi Sakano (loan return to (Japan) Urawa Red Diamonds)
—	FW	JPN	Akito Kawamoto (loan return to (Japan) Ventforet Kofu)
—	FW	JPN	Yudai Nishikawa (to (Japan) Kataller Toyama)
—	FW	JPN	Shota Kaneko (loan return to (Japan) Shimizu S-Pulse)

== Nagano Parceiro ==
In: Note: Flags indicate national team as defined under FIFA eligibility rules; some limited exceptions apply. Players may hold more than one non-FIFA nationality.

No.	Pos.	Nation	Player
3	DF	JPN	Akihiro Sakata (from (Japan) Oita Trinita)
5	DF	JPN	Hiroshi Sekita (from (Japan) FC Gifu)
6	MF	JPN	Ren Sengoku (from (Japan) Fagiano Okayama, previously on loan)
9	FW	JPN	Shogo Shiozawa (from (Japan) Matsumoto Yamaga)
18	FW	JPN	Tomoyuki Arata (from (Japan) Oita Trinita)
19	FW	JPN	Ryota Watanabe (on loan from (Japan) Ehime FC)
22	FW	JPN	Masahide Hiraoka (loan return from (Japan) Azul Claro Numazu)
23	MF	JPN	Hiroshi Azuma (from (Japan) V-Varen Nagasaki)
24	MF	KOR	Ko Kyung-tae (loan return from (Japan) Grulla Morioka)
26	DF	JPN	Ryosuke Tada (from (Japan) Thespakusatsu Gunma)
29	MF	JPN	Teppei Usui (from (Japan) V-Varen Nagasaki)
31	GK	JPN	Ryuki Miura (from (Japan) Kashiwa Reysol)
35	DF	JPN	Takashi Amano (from (Japan) Yokohama F. Marinos)

Out: Note: Flags indicate national team as defined under FIFA eligibility rules; some limited exceptions apply. Players may hold more than one non-FIFA nationality.

No.	Pos.	Nation	Player
—	GK	JPN	Yudai Suwa (retired)
—	DF	JPN	Yuya Mitsunaga (loan return to (Japan) Avispa Fukuoka)
—	DF	JPN	Yoshitaka Ohashi (retired)
—	MF	JPN	Teruyoshi Ito (to (Japan) Blaublitz Akita)
—	MF	JPN	Shinichi Mukai (to (Japan) Nara Club)
—	MF	JPN	Kota Sameshima (loan return to (Japan) Sanfrecce Hiroshima)
—	FW	JPN	Shunta Takahashi (to (Japan) Thespakusatsu Gunma)
—	FW	JPN	Ryota Doi (to (Japan) Grulla Morioka)
—	FW	KOR	Kim Shin-young (released)

== SC Sagamihara ==
In: Note: Flags indicate national team as defined under FIFA eligibility rules; some limited exceptions apply. Players may hold more than one non-FIFA nationality.

No.	Pos.	Nation	Player
4	DF	BRA	Lucas Tavares (from (Brazil) Portuguesa)
6	DF	JPN	Sunao Hozaki (from (Japan) FC Suzuka Rampole)
9	FW	BRA	Alexandre Balotelli (from (Brazil) Boa Esporte Clube)
10	MF	JPN	Ryo Iida (from (Japan) Fagiano Okayama, previously on loan)
14	MF	JPN	Ryota Iwabuchi (from (Japan) Matsumoto Yamaga)
20	MF	JPN	Keita Makiuchi (from (Japan) Blaublitz Akita)
23	GK	JPN	Yoshikatsu Kawaguchi (from (Japan) FC Gifu)
25	MF	JPN	Makoto Fukuin (from (Japan) Kanto Gakuin University)
26	DF	JPN	Noriyuki Ishigaki (from (Japan) Gyosei International School)
28	MF	JPN	Takuro Kikuoka (from (Japan) Consadole Sapporo)
36	FW	JPN	Masaki Fukai (from (Japan) V-Varen Nagasaki)
44	DF	JPN	Norihiro Kawakami (from (Thailand) Trat F.C.)
—	MF	KOR	Kim Yong-hwang (from (South Korea) FC Uijeongbu)

Out: Note: Flags indicate national team as defined under FIFA eligibility rules; some limited exceptions apply. Players may hold more than one non-FIFA nationality.

No.	Pos.	Nation	Player
—	GK	JPN	Takahiro Takagi (released)
—	DF	JPN	Yuki Kotani (loan return to (Japan) Cerezo Osaka)
—	DF	JPN	Masataka Tamura (retired)
—	DF	USA	Mobi Fehr (released)
—	DF	JPN	Takuma Nagayoshi (loan return to (Japan) Tochigi SC)
—	DF	JPN	Yusuke Mori (released)
—	DF	JPN	Hiroki Omori (released)
—	MF	JPN	Yusuke Sudo (retired)
—	MF	BRA	Toró (loan return to (Brazil) Anápolis)
—	MF	JPN	Kenta Suzuki (retired)
—	FW	JPN	Naohiro Takahara (to (Japan) Okinawa SV)
—	FW	BRA	Leozinho (to (Japan) FC Maruyasu Okazaki, previously on loan)
—	FW	JPN	Hiroki Higuchi (loan return to (Japan) Shimizu S-Pulse)
—	FW	BRA	Talles Cunha (to (Moldova) FC Zimbru Chișinău)

== Kataller Toyama ==
In: Note: Flags indicate national team as defined under FIFA eligibility rules; some limited exceptions apply. Players may hold more than one non-FIFA nationality.

No.	Pos.	Nation	Player
2	DF	JPN	Kosei Wakimoto (from (Japan) Tokyo Gakugei University)
3	DF	JPN	Kenji Dai (from (Japan) Ehime FC)
7	MF	JPN	Yuki Kitai (from (Japan) Matsumoto Yamaga, previously on loan)
8	MF	JPN	Ryo Kubota (on loan from (Japan) Tokushima Vortis)
10	MF	JPN	Yu Eto (from (Japan) Tokushima Vortis)
19	FW	JPN	Yudai Nishikawa (from (Japan) Tochigi SC)
20	FW	JPN	Hiroki Nakada (loan return from (Japan) Amitie SC)
23	FW	JPN	Yusei Kayanuma (from (Japan) Kanto Gakuin University, previously on loan)
24	MF	JPN	Ryuki Nishimuro (from (Japan) Hosei University Football Club)
25	MF	JPN	Haruki Umemura (loan return from (Japan) FC Maruyasu Okazaki)
27	DF	JPN	Genki Ishisaka (from (Japan) Toyo University)
28	DF	JPN	Keigo Omi (from (Japan) FC Gifu)

Out: Note: Flags indicate national team as defined under FIFA eligibility rules; some limited exceptions apply. Players may hold more than one non-FIFA nationality.

No.	Pos.	Nation	Player
—	DF	JPN	Yosuke Ikehata (to (Japan) Okinawa SV)
—	DF	JPN	Takuma Hidaka (retired)
—	MF	JPN	Hiroki Tanaka (on loan to (Japan) FC Maruyasu Okazaki)
—	MF	JPN	Yohei Onishi (retired)
—	MF	JPN	Taijiro Mori (released)
—	MF	MAS	Tam Sheang Tsung (released)
—	MF	JPN	Daisuke Asahi (retired)
—	MF	JPN	Kenta Yoshikawa (retired)
—	FW	JPN	Tomoki Muramatsu (to Cambodia Tiger FC)
—	FW	JPN	Yoshiki Yamamoto (released)
—	FW	JPN	Kenzo Nanbu (to (Japan) Briobecca Urayasu)

== Gainare Tottori ==
In: Note: Flags indicate national team as defined under FIFA eligibility rules; some limited exceptions apply. Players may hold more than one non-FIFA nationality.

No.	Pos.	Nation	Player
6	DF	JPN	Takanori Nakajima (from (Japan) Yokohama FC)
8	MF	JPN	Kenji Koyano (from (Japan) Mito Hollyhock)
9	FW	JPN	Masaru Kurotsu (from (Japan) Yokohama FC)
16	MF	JPN	Hayato Ikagaya (from (Japan) Mito Hollyhock)
18	MF	JPN	Shuto Kawai (from (Japan) Osaka Gakuin University)
19	DF	JPN	Shu Kameshima (from (Japan) Ryutsu Keizai University)
20	FW	JPN	Tsuyoshi Miyaichi (on loan from (Japan) Shonan Bellmare)
25	DF	JPN	Daichi Soga (promoted from youth ranks)
26	MF	JPN	Taisei Isoe (promoted from youth ranks)
40	DF	JPN	Yosuke Kataoka (from (Japan) Omiya Ardija)
48	FW	JPN	Shunsuke Maeda (from (Japan) Consadole Sapporo)

Out: Note: Flags indicate national team as defined under FIFA eligibility rules; some limited exceptions apply. Players may hold more than one non-FIFA nationality.

No.	Pos.	Nation	Player
—	DF	JPN	Taishin Morikawa (loan return to (Japan) Roasso Kumamoto)
—	DF	JPN	Kazuaki Mawatari (to (Japan) Zweigen Kanazawa)
—	DF	JPN	Tetsuya Koishi (to (Japan) Vonds Ichihara)
—	MF	JPN	Daiki Yamamoto (to (Japan) Tochigi SC)
—	MF	JPN	Ryosuke Kakigi (to (Japan) Fujieda MYFC)
—	MF	JPN	Naoki Hatada (to (Japan) Blaublitz Akita)
—	MF	JPN	Ryu Miyamoto (to (Japan) Arterivo Wakayama)
—	MF	JPN	Masaya Nozaki (to (Japan) YSCC)
—	MF	JPN	Masato Ishiwa (released)
—	MF	JPN	Naoto Ando (to (Japan) Renofa Yamaguchi)
—	FW	JPN	Yoshiyuki Okumura (to (Japan) ReinMeer Aomori)
—	FW	JPN	Masato Nakayama (to (Japan) Renofa Yamaguchi)
—	FW	JPN	Tomohiro Takana (loan return to (Japan) FC Gifu)

== Fukushima United ==
In: Note: Flags indicate national team as defined under FIFA eligibility rules; some limited exceptions apply. Players may hold more than one non-FIFA nationality.

No.	Pos.	Nation	Player
5	MF	JPN	Takumi Watanabe (from (Japan) Yokohama FC)
17	DF	JPN	Goson Sakai (on loan from (Japan) Albirex Niigata)
22	FW	BRA	Rodrigo Tiuí (from (Japan) FC Gifu, previously on loan)
23	DF	BRA	Paulão (on loan from (Brazil) Roma Esporte Apucarana)
24	MF	JPN	Shota Hasunuma (from (Japan) Sendai University)
26	DF	JPN	Takaya Osanai (on loan from (Japan) Consadole Sapporo)
40	FW	JPN	Hiroki Higuchi (from (Japan) Shimizu S-Pulse)

Out: Note: Flags indicate national team as defined under FIFA eligibility rules; some limited exceptions apply. Players may hold more than one non-FIFA nationality.

No.	Pos.	Nation	Player
—	DF	JPN	Yuji Hoshi (to (Japan) Renofa Yamaguchi)
—	DF	JPN	Takahiro Ohara (released)
—	MF	JPN	Akira Ando (loan return to (Japan) Shonan Bellmare)
—	FW	JPN	Keita Saito (to (Japan) Roasso Kumamoto)
—	FW	JPN	Junya Kokono (released)
—	FW	JPN	Shota Tamura (loan return to (Japan) Shonan Bellmare)

== Blaublitz Akita ==
In: Note: Flags indicate national team as defined under FIFA eligibility rules; some limited exceptions apply. Players may hold more than one non-FIFA nationality.

No.	Pos.	Nation	Player
1	GK	JPN	Masataka Nomura (on loan from (Japan) Nagoya Grampus)
4	DF	JPN	Shuhei Fukai (from (Japan) Hokuriku University)
5	DF	JPN	Shuhei Hotta (from (Japan) Tokyo 23 FC)
6	MF	JPN	Keita Hidaka (from (Japan) Montedio Yamagata)
9	FW	KOR	Go Daimu (from (Japan) Fagiano Okayama)
10	FW	BRA	Caio (from (Brazil) Inter de Bebedouro)
11	MF	JPN	Ken Hisatomi (from (Japan) Fujieda MYFC)
15	MF	JPN	Yuki Hatanaka (from (Japan) Tokai Gakuen University)
16	FW	JPN	Masaya Yuma (from (Japan) Toyo University)
17	FW	JPN	Toshiki Sakai (from (Japan) Sendai University)
18	MF	JPN	Naoki Hatada (from (Japan) Gainare Tottori)
20	MF	JPN	Tokuma Aoshima (from (Japan) Hosei University)
23	GK	JPN	Fumiya Oishi (from (Japan) Meikai University)
25	MF	JPN	Teruyoshi Ito (from (Japan) Nagano Parceiro)
29	FW	JPN	Tomohiro Takana (from (Japan) FC Gifu)
32	DF	JPN	Takahiro Urashima (from (Japan) FC Ryukyu)
36	MF	JPN	Ryoto Higa (on loan from (Japan) FC Gifu)

Out: Note: Flags indicate national team as defined under FIFA eligibility rules; some limited exceptions apply. Players may hold more than one non-FIFA nationality.

No.	Pos.	Nation	Player
—	GK	JPN	Toshimitsu Arai (to (Japan) Nara Club)
—	GK	JPN	Takanori Miyake (to (Japan) Fujieda MYFC)
—	DF	JPN	Toshio Shimakawa (to (Japan) Renofa Yamaguchi)
—	DF	JPN	Shinya Hatta (released)
—	DF	JPN	Colin Killoran (loan return to (Japan) Tokyo Verdy)
—	DF	JPN	Kazuhito Esaki (retired)
—	MF	JPN	Takeshi Handa (released)
—	MF	JPN	Keita Makiuchi (to (Japan) SC Sagamihara)
—	MF	JPN	Jumpei Saito (released)
—	MF	JPN	Hirochika Miyoshi (to (Japan) Fujieda MYFC)
—	MF	JPN	Hayato Mine (to (Japan) Fujieda MYFC)
—	MF	ARG	Agustin Ortega (released)
—	MF	JPN	Sho Sato (loan return to (Japan) JEF United Chiba)
—	MF	JPN	Kenji Suzuki (to (Japan) Tochigi Uva FC)
—	MF	JPN	Shingo Kumabayashi (retired)
—	FW	JPN	Kenta Kakimoto (to (Japan) FC Suzuka Rampole)
—	FW	JPN	Rei Yonezawa (loan return to (Japan) Cerezo Osaka)
—	FW	JPN	Shintaro Hirai (to (Japan) Tochigi Uva FC)
—	FW	BRA	Leonardo Moreira (to (Japan) ReinMeer Aomori)

== FC Ryukyu ==
In: Note: Flags indicate national team as defined under FIFA eligibility rules; some limited exceptions apply. Players may hold more than one non-FIFA nationality.

No.	Pos.	Nation	Player
1	GK	KOR	Part Iru-gyu (from (Japan) Fujieda MYFC)
2	DF	JPN	Kosuke Masutani (from (Japan) Nippon Sport Science University)
3	MF	JPN	Kota Miyagi (from (Japan) Osaka Sangyo University)
4	MF	JPN	Yutaro Chinen (from (Japan) Ritsumeikan University)
5	MF	BRA	Ruan (from (Greece) A.O.T. Alimos F.C.)
9	FW	BRA	Pabro (from (Brazil) Audax Rio)
13	DF	JPN	Katsuhiro Hamada (from (Japan) FC Ganju Iwate)
15	FW	BRA	Leonardo (from (Brazil) Vitória)
16	FW	JPN	Tatsuri Yamauchi (from (Japan) Osaka Sangyo University)
17	GK	JPN	Keisuke Tsumita (from (Japan) Komazawa University)
19	FW	JPN	Satoki Uejo (from (Japan) Yokatsu High School)
20	FW	JPN	Desheun Ryo Yamakawa (from (Japan) Maehara High School)
22	DF	JPN	Shuhei Takizawa (from (Japan) Toyo University)

Out: Note: Flags indicate national team as defined under FIFA eligibility rules; some limited exceptions apply. Players may hold more than one non-FIFA nationality.

No.	Pos.	Nation	Player
—	GK	JPN	Kenji Tanaka (to (Japan) Vanraure Hachinohe)
—	GK	JPN	Junichi Kono (to (Japan) FC Osaka)
—	DF	JPN	Takahiro Urashima (to (Japan) Blaublitz Akita)
—	DF	JPN	Tsubasa Nishida (released)
—	DF	JPN	Yuki Kawabe (to (Japan) Saurcos Fukui)
—	DF	JPN	Ryoya Ueda (to (Japan) Tokyo Musashino City FC)
—	DF	JPN	Daichi Okumiya (released)
—	DF	JPN	Taiki Kikuno (to (Japan) Tokyo Musashino City FC)
—	DF	JPN	Daiki Asada (to (Japan) Fujieda MYFC)
—	MF	JPN	Takashi Fujii (released)
—	MF	JPN	Christopher Tatsuki Kinjo (released)
—	MF	JPN	Jumpei Obata (to (Japan) ReinMeer Aomori)
—	MF	JPN	Kotaro Kawasato (released)
—	MF	JPN	Yuta Shimomura (released)
—	FW	JPN	Shogo Matsuo (retired)
—	FW	JPN	Satoshi Nakayama (retired)

== Fujieda MYFC ==
In: Note: Flags indicate national team as defined under FIFA eligibility rules; some limited exceptions apply. Players may hold more than one non-FIFA nationality.

No.	Pos.	Nation	Player
1	GK	JPN	Takanori Miyake (from (Japan) Blaublitz Akita)
5	DF	JPN	Daiki Asada (from (Japan) FC Ryukyu)
9	FW	JPN	Keisuke Endo (on loan from (Japan) Machida Zelvia)
10	MF	JPN	Nozomi Osako (from (Japan) Verspah Oita)
11	MF	JPN	Hayato Mine (from (Japan) Blaublitz Akita)
13	MF	JPN	Hirochika Miyoshi (from (Japan) Blaublitz Akita)
14	MF	JPN	Kento Nakanishi (from (Japan) Azul Claro Numazu)
16	MF	JPN	Kota Sameshima (from (Japan) Sanfrecce Hiroshima)
20	MF	JPN	Ryosuke Kakigi (from (Japan) Gainare Tottori)
22	DF	JPN	Ryosuke Hisadomi (from (Japan) Thespakusatsu Gunma)
23	DF	JPN	Yujiro Haraguchi (from (Japan) SP Kyoto FC)
24	MF	JPN	Hiroki Sasaki (from (Japan) Toin University of Yokohama)
26	GK	JPN	Syuhei Yamada (from (Japan) Aoyama Gakuin University)
27	FW	JPN	Hiroki Waki (from (Japan) Amitie SC)
30	DF	JPN	Koichi Maeda (from (Japan) Renofa Yamaguchi)
31	MF	JPN	Sho Aoki (from (Japan) Chukyo University)
—	DF	JPN	Naoto Hiraishi (from (Japan) Machida Zelvia)

Out: Note: Flags indicate national team as defined under FIFA eligibility rules; some limited exceptions apply. Players may hold more than one non-FIFA nationality.

No.	Pos.	Nation	Player
—	GK	KOR	Part Iru-gyu (to (Japan) FC Ryukyu)
—	GK	JPN	Shota Tomiya (released)
—	DF	JPN	Daijiro Okuda (retired)
—	DF	JPN	Masaya Sato (retired)
—	DF	POL	Radosław Kamiński (released)
—	DF	JPN	Yuta Kutsukake (to (Japan) Azul Claro Numazu)
—	DF	JPN	Kazushi Uchida (retired)
—	DF	JPN	Shogo Nakatsuru (retired)
—	MF	JPN	Shunya Kamiya (to (Japan) FC Kariya)
—	MF	JPN	Kohei Yoshioka (retired)
—	MF	JPN	Ken Hisatomi (to (Japan) Blaublitz Akita)
—	MF	JPN	Koki Nakamura (released)
—	MF	JPN	Eiji Tomii (retired)
—	MF	JPN	Ryoji Mano (released)
—	FW	JPN	Tsugutoshi Oishi (to (Japan) Tochigi SC)
—	FW	JPN	Takuya Sasagaki (retired)
—	FW	JPN	Naoki Ogawa (loan return to (Japan) Gamba Osaka)
—	FW	JPN	Takahiro Tonio (released)

== Grulla Morioka ==
In: Note: Flags indicate national team as defined under FIFA eligibility rules; some limited exceptions apply. Players may hold more than one non-FIFA nationality.

No.	Pos.	Nation	Player
1	GK	JPN	Kohei Doi (loan return from (Japan) Kyoto Sanga)
2	DF	JPN	Kaito Kubo (from (Japan) Kanto Gakuin University)
6	MF	JPN	Taku Ushinohama (from (Japan) Avispa Fukuoka)
7	FW	JPN	Ryota Doi (from (Japan) Nagano Parceiro)
10	MF	JPN	Kenichi Tanimura (from (Japan) Montedio Yamagata, previously on loan)
15	DF	JPN	Kenta Anraku (from (Japan) MIO Biwako Shiga)
17	MF	JPN	Kazumi Umenai (from (Japan) YSCC)
19	MF	JPN	Takuya Kakine (on loan from (Japan) Machida Zelvia)
22	GK	JPN	Hideto Doi (from (Japan) Tokyo Musashino City FC)
24	DF	JPN	Tatsuya Suzuki (from (Japan) Meiji University)
25	MF	JPN	Kento Dodate (from (Japan) Kanto Gakuin University)
26	MF	JPN	Takashi Saito (free agent, resigned)
27	MF	JPN	Yusaku Toyoshima (free agent, resigned)
28	DF	JPN	Yugo Iiyama (free agent, resigned)

Out: Note: Flags indicate national team as defined under FIFA eligibility rules; some limited exceptions apply. Players may hold more than one non-FIFA nationality.

No.	Pos.	Nation	Player
—	GK	JPN	Nobushige Tabata (to (Japan) Renofa Yamaguchi)
—	GK	JPN	Chikara Hanada (to (Japan) Tochigi Uva FC)
—	DF	JPN	Masato Hashimoto (to (Japan) Saurcos Fukui)
—	DF	JPN	Shun Tanaka (to (Japan) Azul Claro Numazu)
—	DF	JPN	Yusei Okada (to (Japan) Vanraure Hachinohe)
—	MF	JPN	Keisuke Matsumoto (to (Japan) Okinawa SV)
—	MF	JPN	Shota Kimura (retired)
—	MF	JPN	Masahiro Ishikawa (released)
—	MF	JPN	Shota Koide (to (Japan) Nara Club)
—	MF	KOR	Ko Kyung-tae (loan return to (Japan) Nagano Parceiro)
—	MF	JPN	Ryusei Morikawa (retired)
—	FW	JPN	Toshikazu Soya (to (Japan) Saurcos Fukui)
—	FW	JPN	Yuki Abe (retired)
—	FW	JPN	Takahiko Sumida (retired)

== YSCC ==
In: Note: Flags indicate national team as defined under FIFA eligibility rules; some limited exceptions apply. Players may hold more than one non-FIFA nationality.

No.	Pos.	Nation	Player
13	FW	JPN	Masao Tsuji (from (Japan) Zweigen Kanazawa)
15	DF	JPN	Tomoyuki Katabira (from (Japan) Kōchi University)
17	MF	JPN	Koichi Miyao (from (Japan) Toin University of Yokohama)
20	FW	JPN	Hiroto Miyauchi (promoted from youth ranks)
21	DF	JPN	Takahito Ichinohi (from (Japan) Kokugakuin University)
23	MF	JPN	Masaya Nozaki (from (Japan) Gainare Tottori)
30	GK	JPN	Ryosuke Sagawa (from (Japan) Takushoku University)

Out: Note: Flags indicate national team as defined under FIFA eligibility rules; some limited exceptions apply. Players may hold more than one non-FIFA nationality.

No.	Pos.	Nation	Player
—	GK	JPN	Takuya Takahashi (to (Japan) Yokohama F. Marinos)
—	GK	JPN	Manabu Minami (released)
—	DF	JPN	Kyoga Nakamura (loan return to (Japan) JEF United Chiba)
—	DF	JPN	Daiki Hattori (retired)
—	DF	JPN	Kazuya Nakayama (to (Japan) Tochigi Uva FC)
—	DF	JPN	Yuji Fujikawa (retired)
—	DF	JPN	Hayate Yoshida (released)
—	DF	JPN	Shuhei Shirai (retired)
—	MF	JPN	Keisuke Kurouji (retired)
—	MF	JPN	Kazuma Umenai (to (Japan) Grulla Morioka)
—	MF	JPN	Naomichi Hirama (released)
—	MF	JPN	Soutaro Izumi (to (Japan) FC Suzuka Rampole)
—	MF	JPN	Kazuma Inoue (retired)
—	FW	JPN	Goki Tomozawa (released)

== Kagoshima United FC ==
In: Note: Flags indicate national team as defined under FIFA eligibility rules; some limited exceptions apply. Players may hold more than one non-FIFA nationality.

No.	Pos.	Nation	Player
2	MF	JPN	Shun Aso (from (Japan) SP Kyoto FC)
4	MF	JPN	Kosuke Yoshii (from (Japan) Roasso Kumamoto)
9	FW	JPN	Noriaki Fujimoto (from (Japan) SP Kyoto FC)
17	MF	JPN	Yusei Nakahara (from (Japan) National Institute of Fitness and Sports in Kanoya)
19	FW	JPN	Takayuki Fujii (from (Japan) Nippon Sport Science University)
26	DF	JPN	Shogo Tsukaga (from (Japan) Kyushu Kyoritsu University)
28	DF	JPN	Masafumi Terada (from (Japan) National Institute of Fitness and Sports in Kanoya)
31	GK	JPN	Tetsuya Yamaoka (from (Japan) SP Kyoto FC)

Out: Note: Flags indicate national team as defined under FIFA eligibility rules; some limited exceptions apply. Players may hold more than one non-FIFA nationality.

No.	Pos.	Nation	Player
—	GK	JPN	Wataru Kikawa (to (Japan) Vonds Ichihara)
—	DF	JPN	Kazuya Nakayama (to (Japan) Tochigi Uva FC)
—	DF	JPN	Takuya Kohara (released)
—	DF	JPN	Takahasa Yamazaki (loan return to (Japan) Mito Hollyhock)
—	MF	JPN	Yuhei Oba (to (Japan) FC Maruyasu Okazaki)
—	MF	JPN	Sadaaki Nagaiwa (retired)
—	FW	JPN	Yutaka Tahara (released)
