= Mimura =

Mimura may refer to:

- Mimura (village), village in Sri Lanka

== People ==
- Akio Mimura (三村 明夫, born 1940), a prominent Japanese businessman
- Kakuichi Mimura (三村 恪一, 1931–2022), a former Japanese football player and manager
- Makoto Mimura (三村 真, born 1989), a Japanese football player
- Mimura (actress) (ミムラ, born 1984), a Japanese actress
- Mimura Iechika (三村 家親, 1517–1566), a Japanese daimyō of the Sengoku period
- Shingo Mimura (三村 申吾, born 1956), the governor of Aomori Prefecture in Japan
- Takayo Mimura (三村 恭代, born 1985) is a Japanese actress
- Tomoyasu Mimura (三村 智保, born 1969), a professional Go player
- Toshiyuki Mimura (三村 敏之, 1948–2009), a Japanese baseball player and manager
- Wataru Mimura (三村 渉, born 1954), a Japanese screenwriter
- Yoko Mimura (三村 容子; born 1968), a Japanese curler, 1998 Winter Olympics participant

== Fictional characters ==
- Kōki Mimura (三村 航輝), a character in the Assassination Classroom anime and manga
