= Samuel Abiodun Saanumi =

Nigerian footballer

Personal information
- Date of birth: 19 December 1991 (age 34)
- Place of birth: Lagos, Nigeria
- Height: 1.78 m (5 ft 10 in)
- Position: Forward

Team information
- Current team: J-Lease FC
- Number: 28

Youth career
- 2004–2010: Bariga Professional Football Academy

Senior career*
Years	Team	Apps	(Gls)
2011–2014	EEPCO		
2014–2015	Saint George		
2015–2016	Dedebit		
2017	Ethiopian Coffee		
2018–2021	Tegevajaro Miyazaki	60	(11)
2022	Veroskronos Tsuno	17	(13)
2023–	J-Lease FC	27	(15)
- * Club domestic league appearances and goals as of 8 September 2024, 10:06 (UTC)

Samuel Abiodun Saanumi (born 19 December 1991) is a Nigerian footballer currently playing as a forward for J-Lease FC.

== Career statistics ==
=== Club ===
As of 8 September 2024.

Club	Season	League			National Cup		League Cup		Other		Total	
Club	Season	Division	Apps	Goals	Apps	Goals	Apps	Goals	Apps	Goals	Apps	Goals
Tegevajaro Miyazaki	2018	JFL	10	2	0	0	–		0	0	10	2
Tegevajaro Miyazaki	2019	JFL	24	6	0	0	–		0	0	24	6
Tegevajaro Miyazaki	2020	JFL	14	3	1 (Note: Appearances in the Emperor's Cup)	0	–		0	0	15	3
Tegevajaro Miyazaki	2021	J3 League	12	0	0	0	–		0	0	12	0
Veroskronos Tsuno	2022	KSL	17	13	0	0	–		0	0	10	2
J-Lease FC	2023	KSL	14	6	0	0	–		0	0	14	6
J-Lease FC	2024	KSL	13	9	2	0	–		0	0	15	9
Career total			104	39	3	0	0	0	0	0	107	39
