= Koishi =

Koishi (written: 小石 lit "small stone") is a Japanese surname. Notable people with the surname include:

- Hirotaka Koishi (小石 博孝; born 1993), Japanese baseball player
- Kiyoshi Koishi (小石 清; 1908–1957), Japanese photographer
- Tatsuomi Koishi (小石 龍臣; born 1977), Japanese footballer
- Tetsuya Koishi (小石 哲也; born 1990), Japanese footballer
- Yūma Koishi (小石 祐馬; born 1993), Japanese cyclist
- Koishi Komeiji (古明地 こいし), a character in Subterranean Animism from the Touhou Project series

== See also ==
- Chichi Koishi, a 1951 Japanese film
