= Okui =

Okui (written: 奥井) is a Japanese surname. Notable people with the surname include:

- Masami Okui (奥井 雅美; born 1968), Japanese singer-songwriter
- Ryo Okui (奥井 諒; born 1990), Japanese footballer
