= Rempei Uchida =

Japanese footballer

Rempei Uchida 内田 錬平
Personal information
- Full name: Rempei Uchida
- Date of birth: 26 April 1991 (age 35)
- Place of birth: Asahikawa, Japan
- Height: 1.90 m (6 ft 3 in)
- Position: Defender

Team information
- Current team: Tochigi City FC
- Number: 4

Youth career
- 2006–2008: Asahikawa Jitsugyo High School

College career
Years	Team	Apps	(Gls)
2009–2012	Kanazawa Seiryo University		

Senior career*
Years	Team	Apps	(Gls)
2013–2016	Kataller Toyama	45	(3)
2017–2019	Ococias Kyoto (Note: Amitie SC Kyoto announce official change name to Ococias Kyoto AC from 2018 season)	41	(12)
2020–	Tochigi City FC	64	(5)
- * Club domestic league appearances and goals as of 15 February 2025, 14:26 (UTC)

Rempei Uchida (内田 錬平, Uchida Renpei; born 26 April 1991) is a Japanese football player who play as a Defender and currently play for J2 League club, Tochigi City FC. He was captain club for 2025 season.

== Career ==
On 10 January 2020, Uchida was announce official transfer to Kantō Soccer League club, Tochigi City FC for 2020 season.

On 26 November 2023, Uchida brought his club promotion to JFL from 2024 after defeat Joyful Honda Tsukuba 4–0 in final matchweek of JRCL in 2023 and Champions. On 17 November 2024, Uchida brought his club Champions of JFL and promotion to J3 League for the first time in their history from 2025 after defeat Atletico Suzuka 6-0 in matchweek 29 of Japan Football League, returning to third tier after 11 years absence.

Uchida was named in Tochigi City FC new captain for 2025 season.

== Career statistics ==
=== Club ===
As of the match played 15 February 2025.

Club performance			League		Cup		League Cup		Total	
Season	Club	League	Apps	Goals	Apps	Goals	Apps	Goals	Apps	Goals
Japan			League		Emperor's Cup		J.League Cup		Total	
2013	Kataller Toyama	J.League Div 2	3	0	–				3	0
2014	Kataller Toyama	J.League Div 2	2	0	0	0	–		2	0
2015	Kataller Toyama	J3 League	30	2	–				30	2
2016	Kataller Toyama	J3 League	10	1	1	0	–		11	1
2017	Amitie SC Kyoto / Ococias Kyoto	Kansai Div 1	14	5	1	0	–		15	5
2018	Amitie SC Kyoto / Ococias Kyoto	Kansai Div 1	13	3	1	0	–		14	3
2019	Amitie SC Kyoto / Ococias Kyoto	Kansai Div 1	14	1	1	0	–		15	1
2020	Tochigi City FC	Kantō Div 1	8	0	1	1	–		10	1
2021	Tochigi City FC	Kantō Div 1	16	2	2	0	–		18	2
2022	Tochigi City FC	Kantō Div 1	14	0	0	0	–		14	0
2023	Tochigi City FC	Kantō Div 1	16	2	2	0	–		18	2
2024	Tochigi City FC	Japan Football League	10	1	0	0	–		10	1
2025	Tochigi City FC	J3 League	0	0	0	0	0	0	0	0
Career total			150	19	8	1	0	0	158	20

== Honours ==
Amitie SC Kyoto/Ococias Kyoto AC

- Kansai Soccer League Div 1: 2017, 2019

Tochigi City FC

- Kantō Soccer League Div 1: 2020, 2022
- Japanese Regional Football Champions League: 2023
- Japan Football League: 2024
