= Ikiru Aoyama =

Japanese footballer

Personal information
- Full name: Ikiru Aoyama
- Date of birth: 11 April 1996 (age 30)
- Place of birth: Fukuoka, Japan
- Height: 1.73 m (5 ft 8 in)
- Position: Defender

Team information
- Current team: Tegevajaro Miyazaki
- Number: 2

Youth career
- Ogori Minami SC
- Valentia
- 2013–2015: Chikuyo Gakuen High School

College career
Years	Team	Apps	(Gls)
2016–2018	Fukuoka University		

Senior career*
Years	Team	Apps	(Gls)
2019–	Tegevajaro Miyazaki	118	(2)

International career
2013	Japan U17		
- * Club domestic league appearances and goals as of 1 January 2026

Ikiru Aoyama (青山 生, Aoyama Ikiru; born 11 April 1996) is a Japanese footballer currently playing as a right-back for Tegevajaro Miyazaki.

== Early life ==
Aoyama was born in Fukuoka, Japan.

== Career ==
Aoyama scored his first goal for Miyazaki on 3 October 2021, scoring in the 41st minute in a 4-0 victory over Gainare Tottori.

== Career statistics ==
=== Club ===
As of 23 June 2021.

Club	Season	League			National Cup		League Cup		Other		Total	
Club	Season	Division	Apps	Goals	Apps	Goals	Apps	Goals	Apps	Goals	Apps	Goals
Fukuoka University	2018	–			2 (Note: Appearances in the Emperor's Cup)	0	–		0	0	2	0
Tegevajaro Miyazaki	2019	JFL	24	1	0	0	–		0	0	24	1
Tegevajaro Miyazaki	2020	JFL	5	0	1	0	–		0	0	6	0
Tegevajaro Miyazaki	2021	J3 League	6	0	0	0	–		0	0	6	0
Career total			35	1	3	0	0	0	0	0	38	1
