= Makoto Mimura =

Japanese footballer

Makoto Mimura 三村 真
Personal information
- Full name: Makoto Mimura
- Date of birth: March 30, 1989 (age 37)
- Place of birth: Hiroshima, Japan
- Height: 1.65 m (5 ft 5 in)
- Position: Forward

Youth career
- 2004–2006: Yamashiro High School

College career
Years	Team	Apps	(Gls)
2007–2010	Takushoku University		

Senior career*
Years	Team	Apps	(Gls)
2011–2021	Fagiano Okayama	176	(5)
2011–2012	→ Fagiano Okayama Next (loan)	10	(9)
2021–2022	Tegevajaro Miyazaki	30	(2)
2023–2024	Fukuyama City FC		
- * Club domestic league appearances and goals as of 21:49, 8 April 2026 (UTC)

Makoto Mimura (三村 真, born March 30, 1989) is a Japanese former footballer who played as a forward.

== Club statistics ==
Appearances and goals by club, season and competition
Club	Season	League			National cup (Note: Includes Emperors Cup)		Other		Total	
Club	Season	Division	Apps	Goals	Apps	Goals	Apps	Goals	Apps	Goals
Fagiano Okayama	2012	J.League Division 2	11	0	2	0	0	0	13	0
Fagiano Okayama	2013	J.League Division 2	12	1	0	0	0	0	12	1
Fagiano Okayama	2014	J.League Division 2	28	1	0	0	0	0	28	1
Fagiano Okayama	2015	J2 League	20	0	0	0	0	0	20	0
Fagiano Okayama	2016	J2 League	14	0	3	0	2 (Note: Appearance in J1/J2 play-offs)	0	19	0
Fagiano Okayama	2017	J2 League	27	1	2	0	0	0	29	1
Fagiano Okayama	2018	J2 League	35	1	0	0	0	0	35	1
Fagiano Okayama	2019	J2 League	15	0	2	0	0	0	17	0
Fagiano Okayama	2020	J2 League	14	1	0	0	0	0	14	1
Fagiano Okayama	Total		176	5	9	0	2	0	187	5
Tegevajaro Miyazaki	2021	J3 League	20	2	–		–		20	2
Tegevajaro Miyazaki	2022	J3 League	10	0	–		–		10	0
Tegevajaro Miyazaki	Total		30	2	0	0	0	0	30	2
Career total			206	7	9	0	2	0	217	7
