= Ryota Ukai =

Japanese footballer

Personal information
- Full name: Ryota Ukai
- Date of birth: May 28, 1996 (age 30)
- Place of birth: Chiba, Japan
- Height: 1.78 m (5 ft 10 in)
- Position: Defender

Team information
- Current team: Tochigi Uva FC
- Number: 2

Youth career
- 2012–2014: Tokyo Gakkan High School

Senior career*
Years	Team	Apps	(Gls)
2015–2016	Thespa Kusatsu Challengers	17	(3)
2016	Thespakusatsu Gunma	1	(0)
2017–	Tochigi Uva FC		
- * Club domestic league appearances and goals

Ryota Ukai (鵜飼 亮多, Ukai Ryota; born May 28, 1996) is a Japanese football player. He plays for Thespakusatsu Gunma.

== Club statistics ==
Updated to 20 February 2017.

Club performance			League		Cup		Total	
Season	Club	League	Apps	Goals	Apps	Goals	Apps	Goals
Japan			League		Emperor's Cup		Total	
2015	Thespa Kusatsu; Challengers	Gunma Prefectural; League	9	3	–		9	3
2016	Thespa Kusatsu; Challengers	Gunma Prefectural; League	8	0	–		8	0
2016	Thespakusatsu Gunma	J2 League	1	0	2	0	3	0
Total			0	0	0	0	0	0
