= Ryuya Ohata =

Japanese footballer (born 1997)

Personal information
- Date of birth: 12 October 1997 (age 29)
- Place of birth: Gunma, Japan
- Height: 1.80 m (5 ft 11 in)
- Position: Defender

Team information
- Current team: Thespa Gunma
- Number: 3

Youth career
- Takayama JSC
- –2012: Maebashi FC
- 2013–2015: Maebashi Ikuei High School

College career
Years	Team	Apps	(Gls)
2016–2019	Nippon Sport Science University		

Senior career*
Years	Team	Apps	(Gls)
2020–2022	Tegevajaro Miyazaki	20	(1)
2022–2023	Kataller Toyama	25	(0)
2024–	Thespa Gunma	80	(2)
- * Club domestic league appearances and goals as of 25 August 2026

Ryuya Ohata (大畑 隆也, Ohata Ryuya; born 12 October 1997) is a Japanese footballer currently playing as a defender for Thespa Gunma.

== Career statistics ==
=== Club ===
As of 10 November 2021.

Club	Season	League			National Cup		League Cup		Other		Total	
Club	Season	Division	Apps	Goals	Apps	Goals	Apps	Goals	Apps	Goals	Apps	Goals
Tegevajaro Miyazaki	2020	JFL	3	0	1 (Note: Appearances in the Emperor's Cup)	0	–		0	0	4	0
Tegevajaro Miyazaki	2021	J3 League	21	1	0	0	–		0	0	21	1
Kataller Toyama	2022	J3 League	25	0	2	0	–		0	0	27	0
Career total			4	0	1	0	0	0	0	0	5	0
