= Masahiko Sugita =

Japanese footballer

Personal information
- Date of birth: 16 June 1995 (age 31)
- Place of birth: Shizuoka, Japan
- Height: 1.71 m (5 ft 7 in)
- Position: Midfielder

Team information
- Current team: Fujieda MYFC
- Number: 15

Youth career
- –2001: Wakasugi Kindergarten
- 2002–2007: Osada Nishi Elementary School
- 2008–2010: Lopta Shizuoka
- 2011–2013: Shizuoka Nishi High School

College career
Years	Team	Apps	(Gls)
2014–2017	Juntendo University		

Senior career*
Years	Team	Apps	(Gls)
2018–2019	Sony Sendai	49	(19)
2020–	Fujieda MYFC	100	(10)
- * Club domestic league appearances and goals as of 13 August 2026

Masahiko Sugita (杉田 真彦, Sugita Masahiko; born 16 June 1995) is a Japanese professional footballer who plays as a midfielder for Fujieda MYFC.

== Career statistics ==
=== Club ===
As of 13 November 2020.

Club	Season	League			National Cup		League Cup		Other		Total	
Club	Season	Division	Apps	Goals	Apps	Goals	Apps	Goals	Apps	Goals	Apps	Goals
Juntendo University	2015	–			1 (Note: Appearance(s) in Emperor's Cup)	1	–		0	0	1	1
Sony Sendai	2018	JFL	19	8	2	0	–		0	0	21	8
Sony Sendai	2019	JFL	30	11	0	0	–		0	0	30	11
Sony Sendai	Total		49	19	2	0	0	0	0	0	51	19
Fujieda MYFC	2020	J3 League	8	0	0	0	–		0	0	8	0
Career total			57	19	3	1	0	0	0	0	60	20
