= Sora Igawa =

Japanese footballer

Sora Igawa 井川 空
Personal information
- Full name: Sora Igawa
- Date of birth: 15 January 2000 (age 26)
- Place of birth: Katō, Hokkaido, Japan
- Height: 1.80 m (5 ft 11 in)
- Positions: Defensive midfielder; centre back

Team information
- Current team: FC Gifu
- Number: 6

Youth career
- Progresso Tokachi
- –2017: Hokkaido Consadole Sapporo

College career
Years	Team	Apps	(Gls)
2018–2021	University of Tsukuba		

Senior career*
Years	Team	Apps	(Gls)
2022–2024	Hokkaido Consadole Sapporo	0	(0)
2023	→ Fagiano Okayama (loan)	1	(0)
2024	Fagiano Okayama	0	(0)
2025–	FC Gifu	2	(0)

International career^{‡}
2016	Japan U16		
2017	Japan U17	3	(0)
2018	Japan U18		
- * Club domestic league appearances and goals as of 1st January 2026 ‡ National team caps and goals as of 17:04, 23 February 2022 (UTC)

Sora Igawa (井川 空, Igawa Sora; born 15 January 2000) is a Japanese footballer who plays as a defensive midfielder or a centre back for J3 League club FC Gifu.

== Career ==
On 18 November 2021, Igawa was announced at Consadole Sapporo from the 2022 season. He made his professional debut for the club in the J.League Cup against Sagan Tosu on 23 February 2022.

On 15 December 2022, Igawa was announced at Fagiano Okayama on loan. He made his league debut against Zweigen Kanazawa on 12 November 2023.

On 16 December 2023, Igawa was announced at Fagiano Okayama on a permanent transfer. He made his professional debut in the J.League Cup against Tegevajaro Miyazaki on 6 March 2024.

On 26 December 2024, Igawa was announced at FC Gifu.

== Style of play ==
Igawa can play as a defensive midfielder or center back, and is noted for his passing.

== Career statistics ==
=== Club ===
As of 21 March 2023.

Appearances and goals by club, season and competition
Club	Season	League			National Cup		League Cup		Other		Total	
Club	Season	Division	Apps	Goals	Apps	Goals	Apps	Goals	Apps	Goals	Apps	Goals
Japan			League		Emperor's Cup		J.League Cup		Other		Total	
University of Tsukuba	2020	–			5	1	–		0	0	5	1
Hokkaido Consadole Sapporo	2022	J1 League	0	0	2	0	3	0	0	0	5	0
Fagiano Okayama (loan)	2023	J2 League	0	0	0	0	–		–		0	0
Career total			0	0	7	1	3	0	0	0	10	1
