= Yusei Okada =

Japanese footballer

Personal information
- Full name: Yusei Okada
- Date of birth: May 8, 1987 (age 39)
- Place of birth: Kumamoto, Japan
- Height: 1.78 m (5 ft 10 in)
- Position: Defender

Team information
- Current team: Vanraure Hachinohe
- Number: 4

Youth career
- 2006–2009: Fukuoka University

Senior career*
Years	Team	Apps	(Gls)
2010–2012	Tochigi Uva FC	66	(1)
2013–2015	Grulla Morioka	82	(6)
2016–	Vanraure Hachinohe		
Total		148	(7)
- * Club domestic league appearances and goals as of December 31, 2015

Yusei Okada (岡田 祐政, Okada Yusei; born May 8, 1987) is a Japanese football player. He plays for Vanraure Hachinohe.

== Playing career ==
Yusei Okada joined to Tochigi Uva FC in 2010. In 2013, he moved to Grulla Morioka. In 2016, he moved to Vanraure Hachinohe.
