= Yuki Nishiya =

Japanese footballer

Yuki Nishiya 西谷 優希
Personal information
- Full name: Yuki Nishiya
- Date of birth: October 5, 1993 (age 33)
- Place of birth: Tochigi, Japan
- Height: 1.65 m (5 ft 5 in)
- Position: Midfielder

Team information
- Current team: Zweigen Kanazawa
- Number: 15

Youth career
- Mashiko SC Strada
- –2008: JEF Utsunomiya
- 2009–2011: Kashima Gakuen High School

College career
Years	Team	Apps	(Gls)
2012–2014	Sendai University		

Senior career*
Years	Team	Apps	(Gls)
2014–2017	Hilal Bergheim		
2017–2018	TuS Erndtebrück	28	(3)
2018–2023	Tochigi SC	131	(5)
2024–	Zweigen Kanazawa	91	(2)
- * Club domestic league appearances and goals as of 21 August 2026

Yuki Nishiya (西谷 優希, Nishiya Yūki; born October 5, 1993) is a Japanese football player for Zweigen Kanazawa.

== Playing career ==
Nishiya was born in Tochigi Prefecture on October 5, 1993. After graduating from Sendai University, he joined J2 League club Tochigi SC in 2018.

He is the twin brother of Kazuki Nishiya, who currently plays for Tokushima Vortis.
