= Shunya Sakai =

Japanese footballer

Shunya Sakai 坂井 駿也
Personal information
- Date of birth: 16 April 2004 (age 22)
- Place of birth: Kumamoto, Japan
- Height: 1.71 m (5 ft 7 in)
- Position: Midfielder

Team information
- Current team: Tegevajaro Miyazaki
- Number: 82

Youth career
- Sorriso Kumamoto
- –2022: Sagan Tosu

Senior career*
Years	Team	Apps	(Gls)
2022–2026	Sagan Tosu	0	(0)
2024–2026	→ Tegevajaro Miyazaki (loan)	61	(1)
2026–	Tegevajaro Miyazaki	12	(1)

International career
2019	Japan U15	2	(0)
2019–2020	Japan U16	4	(1)
2021	Japan U17		
- * Club domestic league appearances and goals as of 12:52, 12 August 2026 (UTC)

Shunya Sakai (坂井 駿也, Sakai Shunya; born 16 April 2004) is a Japanese professional footballer who plays as a midfielder for J2 League club Tegevajaro Miyazaki.

== Career statistics ==
As of 3 June 2024

Appearances and goals by club, season and competition
Club	Season	League			Emperor's Cup		J. League Cup		Other		Total	
Club	Season	Division	Apps	Goals	Apps	Goals	Apps	Goals	Apps	Goals	Apps	Goals
Sagan Tosu	2022	J1 League	0	0	0	0	2	0	—		2	0
Sagan Tosu	2023	J1 League	0	0	0	0	2	0	—		2	0
Sagan Tosu	Total		0	0	0	0	4	0	0	0	4	0
Tegevajaro Miyazaki (loan)	2024	J3 League	5	0	1	0	0	0	0	0	6	0
Career total			5	0	1	0	4	0	0	0	10	0
