= Seiji Shindo =

Japanese footballer (born 1992)

Seiji Shindo 進藤 誠司
Personal information
- Full name: Seiji Shindo
- Date of birth: 12 December 1992 (age 33)
- Place of birth: Kanagawa, Japan
- Height: 1.67 m (5 ft 6 in)
- Position: Defender

Team information
- Current team: ReinMeer Aomori

Youth career
- 2011–2014: Kokushikan University

Senior career*
Years	Team	Apps	(Gls)
2015–2018	Kataller Toyama	50	(2)
2019	Veertien Mie	30	(0)
2020–	Azul Claro Numazu		
2020–	→ ReinMeer Aomori (loan)		
- * Club domestic league appearances and goals as of 26 February 2020

Seiji Shindo (進藤 誠司, Shindo Seiji; born 12 December 1992) is a Japanese football player who plays for ReinMeer Aomori on loan from Azul Claro Numazu.

== Club statistics ==
Updated to 23 February 2020.

Club performance			League		Cup		Total	
Season	Club	League	Apps	Goals	Apps	Goals	Apps	Goals
Japan			League		Emperor's Cup		Total	
2015	Kataller Toyama	J3 League	13	2	–		13	2
2016	Kataller Toyama	J3 League	21	0	2	0	23	0
2017	Kataller Toyama	J3 League	3	0	1	0	4	0
2018	Kataller Toyama	J3 League	13	0	2	0	15	0
2019	Veertien Mie	JFL	30	0	3	0	33	0
Career total			80	2	8	0	88	2
