= Sho Tanaka (footballer) =

Japanese footballer

Sho Tanaka 田中憧
Personal information
- Full name: Sho Tanaka
- Date of birth: November 21, 1994 (age 31)
- Place of birth: Tokyo, Japan
- Height: 1.77 m (5 ft 9 1/2 in)
- Position: Defender

Team information
- Current team: Fukuyama City FC
- Number: 4

Youth career
- 2013–2016: Toin University of Yokohama

Senior career*
Years	Team	Apps	(Gls)
2017–2018	Grulla Morioka		
2019	Ococias Kyoto		
2020–	Fukuyama City FC		
- * Club domestic league appearances and goals as of 20 December 2020

Sho Tanaka (田中 憧, Tanaka Sho; born November 21, 1994) is a Japanese football player for Fukuyama City FC.

== Career ==
Sho Tanaka joined J3 League club Grulla Morioka in 2017.

== Club statistics ==
Updated to 29 August 2018.

Club performance			League		Cup		Total	
Season	Club	League	Apps	Goals	Apps	Goals	Apps	Goals
Japan			League		Emperor's Cup		Total	
2017	Grulla Morioka	J3 League	2	0	0	0	2	0
2018	Grulla Morioka	J3 League	0	0	0	0	0	0
Total			2	0	0	0	2	0
