= Toshihiro Horikawa =

Japanese footballer (born 1989)

Personal information
- Full name: Toshihiro Horikawa
- Date of birth: May 28, 1989 (age 37)
- Place of birth: Sanuki, Kagawa, Japan
- Height: 1.68 m (5 ft 6 in)
- Position: Midfielder

Team information
- Current team: Hokkaido Tokachi Sky Earth

Youth career
- 2005–2007: Tokushima Vortis Youth
- 2008–2011: Ryutsu Keizai University

Senior career*
Years	Team	Apps	(Gls)
2012–2015	Kamatamare Sanuki	40	(2)
2016–2019	Suzuka Unlimited FC	43	(9)
2020–	Hokkaido Tokachi Sky Earth		
- * Club domestic league appearances and goals as of 22 January 2020

Toshihiro Horikawa (堀河 俊大, Horikawa Toshihiro; born May 28, 1989) is a Japanese football player. He plays for Hokkaido Tokachi Sky Earth.

== Playing career ==
Toshihiro Horikawa played for Kamatamare Sanuki from 2012 to 2015. In 2016, he moved to Suzuka Unlimited FC.

== Club statistics ==
Updated to 22 January 2020.

Club performance			League		Cup		Total	
Season	Club	League	Apps	Goals	Apps	Goals	Apps	Goals
Japan			League		Emperor's Cup		Total	
2012	Kamatamare Sanuki	JFL	14	0	2	2	16	2
2013	Kamatamare Sanuki	JFL	8	2	0	0	8	2
2014	Kamatamare Sanuki	J2 League	15	0	1	0	16	0
2015	Kamatamare Sanuki	J2 League	3	0	1	0	4	0
2015	Suzuka Unlimited FC	JRL (Tōkai, Div. 1)	7	1	2	0	4	0
2015	Suzuka Unlimited FC	JRL (Tōkai, Div. 1)	14	5	0	0	14	5
2015	Suzuka Unlimited FC	JRL (Tōkai, Div. 1)	11	3	1	0	12	3
2019	Suzuka Unlimited FC	JFL	11	0	–		11	0
Total			83	11	7	2	90	13
