= Chikara Hanada =

Japanese footballer

Personal information
- Full name: Chikara Hanada
- Date of birth: November 24, 1993 (age 32)
- Place of birth: Tochigi, Japan
- Height: 1.82 m (5 ft 11 1/2 in)
- Position: Goalkeeper

Team information
- Current team: Okinawa SV
- Number: 1

Youth career
- YFC 21
- –2008: Tochigi SC
- 2009–2011: Utsunomiya Hakuyo High School

Senior career*
Years	Team	Apps	(Gls)
2012–2014	Japan Soccer College	9	(0)
2015	Grulla Morioka	4	(0)
2016–2017	Tochigi Uva FC	32	(0)
2018–2021	Vanraure Hachinohe	39	(0)
2021-	Okinawa SV	76	(0)
Total		160	(0)
- * Club domestic league appearances and goals as of 24/1/24 @ 14:00(AEST)

Chikara Hanada (花田 力, Hanada Chikara; born November 24, 1993) is a Japanese football player. He plays for Okinawa SV.

== Playing career ==
Chikara Hanada played for Japan Soccer College from 2012 to 2014. He moved to Grulla Morioka in 2015 and to Tochigi Uva FC in 2016.

== Club statistics ==
Updated to 20 February 2018.

Appearances and goals by club, season and competition
Club	Season	League			Emperor's Cup		Total	
Club	Season	Division	Apps	Goals	Apps	Goals	Apps	Goals
Japan Soccer College	2012	JRL (Hokushinetsu)	0	0	0	0	0	0
Japan Soccer College	2013	JRL (Hokushinetsu)	9	0	0	0	9	0
Japan Soccer College	2014	JRL (Hokushinetsu)	0	0	0	0	0	0
Grulla Morioka	2015	J3 League	4	0	0	0	4	0
Tochigi Uva FC	2016	JFL	12	0	1	0	13	0
Tochigi Uva FC	2017	JFL	20	0	1	0	21	0
Career total			45	0	2	0	47	0
