= Toshiki Mori =

Japanese footballer

Toshiki Mori 森 俊貴
Personal information
- Date of birth: 27 August 1997 (age 29)
- Place of birth: Motegi, Tochigi, Japan
- Height: 1.78 m (5 ft 10 in)
- Position: Midfielder

Team information
- Current team: Tochigi City FC
- Number: 8

Youth career
- –2015: Tochigi SC

College career
Years	Team	Apps	(Gls)
2016–2019	Hosei University		

Senior career*
Years	Team	Apps	(Gls)
2020–2024	Tochigi SC	163	(12)
2025–	Tochigi City FC	54	(7)
- * Club domestic league appearances and goals as of 16 August 2026

Toshiki Mori (森 俊貴, Mori Toshiki; born 27 August 1997) is a Japanese footballer who play as a midfielder and currently play for Tochigi City FC.

== Career ==
Mori starting first professional career with Tochigi SC in 2020.

On 5 January 2025, Mori signed with J3 promoted club, Tochigi City FC for 2025 season.

== Career statistics ==
As of match played 15 February 2025.

Appearances and goals by club, season and competition
Club	Season	League			Emperor's Cup		J.League Cup		Other		Total	
Club	Season	Division	Apps	Goals	Apps	Goals	Apps	Goals	Apps	Goals	Apps	Goals
Hosei University	2019	–			3	1	–		0	0	3	1
Tochigi SC	2020	J2 League	38	5	0	0	0	0	0	0	38	5
Tochigi SC	2021	J2 League	38	5	2	0	0	0	0	0	40	5
Tochigi SC	2022	J2 League	29	0	2	0	0	0	0	0	31	2
Tochigi SC	2023	J2 League	25	2	2	0	0	0	0	0	27	2
Tochigi SC	2024	J2 League	33	0	1	0	1	0	0	0	35	0
Tochigi City FC	2025	J3 League	1	0	0	0	0	0	0	0	1	0
Career total			164	12	10	1	1	0	0	0	175	13
