= Lucas Tavares =

Brazilian footballer

Personal information
- Full name: Lucas Coutinho Tavares
- Date of birth: July 10, 1992 (age 34)
- Place of birth: Brazil
- Height: 1.87 m (6 ft 1 1/2 in)
- Position: Defender

Team information
- Current team: Resende
- Number: 4

Senior career*
Years	Team	Apps	(Gls)
2016–	SC Sagamihara	16	(2)
Total		16	(2)
- * Club domestic league appearances and goals

Lucas Coutinho Tavares (born July 10, 1992) is a Brazilian football player. He plays for Resende.

== Career ==
Lucas Tavares joined J3 League club SC Sagamihara in 2016.
