= Kenta Okuma =

Japanese footballer

Personal information
- Date of birth: 14 June 1997 (age 29)
- Place of birth: Saitama, Japan
- Height: 1.73 m (5 ft 8 in)
- Position: Midfielder

Team information
- Current team: Tegevajaro Miyazaki
- Number: 6

Youth career
- Omaki SSS
- –2015: FC Tokyo

College career
Years	Team	Apps	(Gls)
2016–2019	Fukuoka University		

Senior career*
Years	Team	Apps	(Gls)
2020–	Tegevajaro Miyazaki	94	(2)
- * Club domestic league appearances and goals as of 16 August 2026

Kenta Okuma (大熊 健太, Okuma Kenta; born 14 June 1997) is a Japanese footballer currently playing as a midfielder for Tegevajaro Miyazaki.

== Career statistics ==
=== Club ===
As of 20 March 2021.

Club	Season	League			National Cup		League Cup		Other		Total	
Club	Season	Division	Apps	Goals	Apps	Goals	Apps	Goals	Apps	Goals	Apps	Goals
Tegevajaro Miyazaki	2020	JFL	7	0	1 (Note: Appearances in the Emperor's Cup)	0	–		0	0	8	0
Tegevajaro Miyazaki	2021	J3 League	1	0	0	0	–		0	0	1	0
Career total			8	0	1	0	0	0	0	0	9	0
