= Ryo Okui =

Japanese footballer

Ryo Okui 奥井 諒
Personal information
- Full name: Ryo Okui
- Date of birth: 7 March 1990 (age 36)
- Place of birth: Toyonaka, Osaka, Japan
- Height: 1.69 m (5 ft 6 1/2 in)
- Position: Midfielder

Team information
- Current team: Tochigi City
- Number: 5

Youth career
- 1999–2004: Gamba Osaka
- 2005–2007: Riseisha High School

College career
Years	Team	Apps	(Gls)
2008–2011	Waseda University		

Senior career*
Years	Team	Apps	(Gls)
2012–2015	Vissel Kobe	97	(3)
2016–2019	Omiya Ardija	81	(3)
2020–2021	Shimizu S-Pulse	35	(0)
2022–2024	V-Varen Nagasaki	39	(1)
2024–	Tochigi City	60	(3)
- * Club domestic league appearances and goals as of 16 August 2026

Ryo Okui (奥井 諒, Okui Ryō; born 7 March 1990) is a Japanese football player who play as a midfielder and currently play for Tochigi City.

== Career ==
=== Vissel Kobe ===
Ryo made his debut for Vissel in the J.League Cup on 20 March 2012. Ryo's first goal for Vissel would come on 17 November 2012, scoring the only goal in the 27th minute.

=== Omiya Ardija ===
Ryo made his debut for Omiya on 20 March 2016, coming on for Keigo Numata. Ryo scored his first goal for Omiya on 29 May 2016, scoring in the 12th minute.

=== Shimizu S-Pulse ===
Ryo made his debut for Shimizu in the J.League Cup on 16 February 2020.

=== V-Varen Nagasaki ===
Ryo made his debut for V-Varen on 19 February 2022. He scored his first goal for V-Varen on 12 March 2022, scoring in the 67th minute.

=== Tochigi City FC ===
On 23 December 2023, Ryo announcement officially transfer to JFL promoted club, Tochigi City FC for upcoming 2024 season. On 17 November 2024, Ryo was brought his club secure champions of 2024 JFL and promotion to J3 League for the first time in history from next season after defeat Atletico Suzuka 6-0 in matchweek 29.

== International career ==
In August 2007, Okui was called up to the Japan U-17 national team for the 2007 U-17 World Cup, but he did not play in any of the matches.

== Career statistics ==
As of the end 2024 season.

Appearances and goals by club, season and competition
Club	Season	League			Emperor's Cup		J. League Cup		Total	
Club	Season	Division	Apps	Goals	Apps	Goals	Apps	Goals	Apps	Goals
Vissel Kobe	2012	J. League Div 1	27	1	1	0	4	0	32	1
Vissel Kobe	2013	J. League Div 2	40	2	1	0	—		41	2
Vissel Kobe	2014	J. League Div 1	13	0	1	0	3	0	17	0
Vissel Kobe	2015	J1 League	17	0	2	1	4	0	23	1
Omiya Ardija	2016	J1 League	25	2	3	0	4	0	32	2
Omiya Ardija	2017	J1 League	21	0	2	1	5	1	28	2
Omiya Ardija	2018	J2 League	9	0	2	0	0	0	11	0
Omiya Ardija	2019	J2 League	26	1	0	0	0	0	26	1
Shimizu S-Pulse	2020	J1 League	18	0	0	0	3	0	21	0
Shimizu S-Pulse	2021	J1 League	17	0	0	0	7	0	24	0
V-Varen Nagasaki	2022	J2 League	27	1	3	0	—		30	1
V-Varen Nagasaki	2023	J2 League	12	0	1	0	—		13	0
Tochigi City FC	2024	Japan Football League	22	2	1	0	—		23	1
Tochigi City FC	2025	J3 League	0	0	0	0	0	0	0	0
Career Total			274	9	21	2	30	1	325	12

== Honours ==
Tochigi City FC

- Japan Football League: 2024
