= Fukuyama City FC =

Japanese football club

Fukuyama City FC 福山シティFC
- Full name: Fukuyama City FC
- Founded: 2017; 9 years ago as Fukuyama City SCC
- Stadium: Fukuyama Transport, Rose Stadium
- Capacity: 10,081
- Chairman: Yoshihiro Okamoto
- Manager: Takumu Kotanino
- League: Chūgoku Soccer League
- 2026: 1st of 10 (champions)
- Website: fukuyama-city.com

Fukuyama City FC (福山シティFC, Fukuyama Shiti Efu Shi) are a Japanese football club based in the eastern part of Hiroshima, centered on the city of Fukuyama. They play in the Chūgoku Soccer League, which part of Japanese Regional Leagues.

== History ==
Founded on 2017 as Fukuyama SCC (Fukuyama Sports Community Club), the club started their journey on the lower levels of Hiroshima Prefectural Leagues system. Despite playing in the 5th tier of prefectural league football, on 2018, after winning the Hiroshima Prefectural Adult Final Tournament, they got instantly promoted to the 2nd division of the prefecture for the 2019 season.

On 2019, the team changed its name into Fukuyama City FC. The club won back-to-back promotions with high-scoring matches, alongside an unbeaten streak that started on their foundation, on 2017, only being broken on 2022. The club quickly established themselves as one of the quickest-developed clubs in Japanese football, jumping from the Prefectural League 5th Division to the Chugoku Soccer League in a five-season span. They played in the 2020 Emperor's Cup, where they won four matches to arrive at the quarter-finals. Uncommon feat for a young club (4-years old at the time), they successfully managed to win against teams of the 4th and 5th tiers of Japanese football while being a Prefectural League club. They were only stopped by Blaublitz Akita, to whom they lost by 3–1 in a tough match.

In 2022, Fukuyama City won the Chugoku Soccer League in their debut at Regional League level, qualifying them for the 2022 Regional Champions League. They finished second in their group but were eliminated from the tournament. If they had won or finished runners up in the tournament they would have been directly promoted to the 2023 Japan Football League. Promotion to the JFL would have helped to potentially fulfill their goal of joining the J3 League by 2024.

== League and Cup record ==
Champions	Runners-up	Third place	Promoted	Relegated

League												Emperor's Cup
Season	Division	Tier	Pos.	P	W	D	L	F	A	GD	Pts	Emperor's Cup
As Fukuyama City SCC
2017	Eastern Hiroshima Prefectural League	8	1st	9	9	0	0	42	3	39	27	Did not participate in the prefectural qualifiers
2018	Eastern Hiroshima Prefectural League	8	1st	11	11	0	0	67	1	66	33	Eliminated in the prefectural qualifiers
As Fukuyama City FC
2019	Hiroshima Prefectural League 2nd Div.	7	1st	11	11	0	0	107	5	102	33	Eliminated in the prefectural qualifiers
2020	Hiroshima Prefectural League 1st Div.	6	1st	5	5	0	0	41	0	41	15	Quarter-finals
2021	Hiroshima Prefectural League 1st Div.	6	1st	6	6	0	0	54	0	54	18	2nd round
2022	Chugoku Soccer League	5	1st	18	15	2	1	60	10	50	47	2nd round
2023	Chugoku Soccer League	5	1st	18	18	0	0	69	6	63	54	Did not qualify
2024	Chugoku Soccer League	5	1st	18	14	3	1	71	13	58	45	2nd round
2025	Chugoku Soccer League	5	1st	18	16	1	1	68	6	62	49	2nd round
2026	Chugoku Soccer League	5	1st	18	16	2	0	30	9	21	50	2nd round

Key

- Pos. = Position in league; P = Games played; W = Games won; D = Games drawn; L = Games lost; F = Goals scored; A = Goals conceded; GD = Goal difference; Pts = Points won

== Honours ==
Fukuyama City honours
Honour	No.	Years
Eastern Hiroshima Prefectural League	2	2017, 2018
Hiroshima Prefectural League 2nd Division	1	2019
Hiroshima Prefectural League 1st Division	1	2020
All Hiroshima Football Championship Emperor's Cup Hiroshima Prefectural Qualifiers	5	2020, 2021, 2022, 2024, 2025, 2026/27
Chūgoku Soccer League	5	2022, 2023, 2024, 2025, 2026

== Current squad ==
As of 30 April 2024.

Note: Flags indicate national team as defined under FIFA eligibility rules; some limited exceptions apply. Players may hold more than one non-FIFA nationality.

No.	Pos.	Nation	Player
1	GK	JPN	Daiki Kikuchi
2	DF	JPN	Kazuki Ninomiya
3	DF	JPN	Ryota Tokunaga
4	MF	JPN	Yosuke Toji
5	DF	JPN	Kota Nishihara
6	DF	JPN	Kengo Takata
7	MF	JPN	Atsushi Fujii
8	MF	JPN	Yusuke Tsukada
9	FW	JPN	Kei Takahashi
10	MF	JPN	Wataru Sumida
11	MF	JPN	Hiroki Takahashi
14	FW	JPN	Naoto Toji
15	DF	JPN	Ryotaro Hiramatsu
16	DF	JPN	Wataru Kuromiya
17	MF	JPN	Kumpei Kakuta
18	MF	JPN	Ryoga Masuda (on loan from FC Imabari)

No.	Pos.	Nation	Player
20	MF	JPN	Shun Taguchi
21	GK	JPN	Kotaro Miyazaki
22	MF	JPN	Soto Yokoo
23	FW	JPN	Yusuke Yoshii
25	MF	JPN	Ryu Natori
26	MF	JPN	Tomoya Nohama
27	DF	JPN	Hibiki Nishio (on loan from Gainare Tottori)
28	MF	JPN	Kento Wakamiya
29	FW	JPN	Ryuichi Okubo
30	MF	JPN	Kenta Sawada
31	GK	JPN	Kaname Murata
33	MF	JPN	Rikito Sugiura
36	MF	JPN	Makoto Mimura
41	GK	JPN	Kaito Inishi
47	MF	JPN	Taiki Takaki

== Coaching staff ==
Position	Name
Manager	(Japan) Ryota Mori
Assistant manager	(Japan) Hwang Choi (Japan) Hakuto Miyashita
Goalkeeper coach	(Japan) Hiroki Tsuda
Trainer	(Japan) Daiki Tonoshiro
Strength & Conditioning coach	(Japan) Yuki Kodama
Equipment manager and Kit man	(Japan) Tomoya Takeishi
Sports nutritionist	(Japan) Hiroe Uehara
