= Keisuke Kurouji =

Japanese footballer

Personal information
- Full name: Keisuke Kurouji
- Date of birth: April 6, 1991 (age 35)
- Place of birth: Chiba, Japan
- Height: 1.78 m (5 ft 10 in)
- Position: Midfielder

Youth career
- 2010–2013: Fukuoka University

Senior career*
Years	Team	Apps	(Gls)
2014–2015	YSCC Yokohama	12	(0)
Total		12	(0)
- * Club domestic league appearances and goals

Keisuke Kurouji (黒氏 啓介, Kurouji Keisuke; born April 6, 1991) is a former Japanese football player.

== Playing career ==
Keisuke Kurouji played for J3 League club; YSCC Yokohama from 2014 to 2015.
