= Hayato Nishinoue =

Japanese footballer (born 1996)

Personal information
- Date of birth: 21 February 1996 (age 30)
- Place of birth: Osaka, Japan
- Height: 1.75 m (5 ft 9 in)
- Position: Defender

Team information
- Current team: North Sunshine

Youth career
- 2008–2010: Fukai Chuo Junior HS
- 2011–2013: Kindai University Wakayama HS
- 2014–2017: Kōchi University

Senior career*
Years	Team	Apps	(Gls)
2018	FC Imabari	9	(1)
2019–2020	Fujieda MYFC	1	(0)
2020	→ Verspah Oita (loan)	15	(0)
2021–2023	Verspah Oita	76	(1)
2024–	North Sunshine	22	(3)
- * Club domestic league appearances and goals as of 17:04, 27 October 2024 (UTC)

Hayato Nishinoue (西埜植 颯斗, Nishinoue Hayato; born 21 February 1996) is a Japanese footballer who plays as a defender for Australian club North Sunshine.

== Career ==
Born in the Osaka Prefecture of Japan, Nishinoue started playing football in kindergarten, but solely played during his time in school, instead of joining an organised club. Having played football at the Kōchi University, he decided to pursue a career in the sport, and after turning down offers from multiple clubs, he joined Japan Football League club FC Imabari ahead of the 2018 season.

After one season with Imabari, Nishinoue signed for J3 League club Fujieda MYFC. However, after just one appearance in the league, he was loaned to Japan Football League club Verspah Oita for the following season. He was released by Fujieda MYFC at the conclusion of the 2020 season. He returned to Verspah Oita on a permanent basis, and established himself as a key player in the side over the next three years.

== Personal life ==
Nishinoue is a qualified maths teacher. In late 2023, he and Verspah Oita teammates visited the Kamekawa Elementary School to teach students how to harvest rice.

== Career statistics ==
As of 27 October 2024.

Appearances and goals by club, season and competition
Club	Season	League			Cup		Other		Total	
Club	Season	Division	Apps	Goals	Apps	Goals	Apps	Goals	Apps	Goals
Kōchi University	2015	–			1 (Note: Appearances in the Emperor's Cup)	0	0	0	1	0
FC Imabari	2018	JFL	9	1	1	0	0	0	10	1
Fujieda MYFC	2019	J3 League	1	0	0	0	0	0	1	0
Fujieda MYFC	2020	J3 League	0	0	0	0	0	0	0	0
Fujieda MYFC	Total		1	0	0	0	0	0	1	0
Verspah Oita (loan)	2020	JFL	15	0	3	0	0	0	18	0
Verspah Oita	2021	JFL	25	1	3	0	0	0	28	1
Verspah Oita	2022	JFL	28	0	2	0	0	0	30	0
Verspah Oita	2023	JFL	23	0	2	0	0	0	25	0
Verspah Oita	Total		91	1	10	0	0	0	101	1
North Sunshine	2024	VPL 2	22	3	3 (Note: Appearances in Australia Cup qualification)	0	0	0	25	3
Career total			123	5	15	0	0	0	138	5
