= Kazuki Nishiya =

Japanese footballer

Kazuki Nishiya 西谷和希
Personal information
- Full name: Kazuki Nishiya
- Date of birth: October 5, 1993 (age 33)
- Place of birth: Tochigi, Japan
- Height: 1.65 m (5 ft 5 in)
- Position: Midfielder

Team information
- Current team: Tochigi City FC
- Number: 24

Youth career
- 2012–2015: Ryutsu Keizai University

Senior career*
Years	Team	Apps	(Gls)
2016–2019	Tochigi SC	137	(20)
2020–2024	Tokushima Vortis	144	(16)
2024–2025	Zweigen Kanazawa	56	(4)
2026–	Tochigi City FC	21	(2)
- * Club domestic league appearances and goals as of 16 August 2026

Kazuki Nishiya (西谷 和希, Nishiya Kazuki; born October 5, 1993) is a Japanese football player. He plays for Tochigi City FC.

== Career ==
Kazuki Nishiya joined J3 League club Tochigi SC in 2016.

He is the twin brother of Yuki Nishiya, who currently plays for Tochigi SC.

== Club statistics ==
Updated to end of 2018 season.

Club performance			League		Cup		Total	
Season	Club	League	Apps	Goals	Apps	Goals	Apps	Goals
Japan			League		Emperor's Cup		Total	
2016	Tochigi SC	J3 League	26	1	0	0	26	1
2017	Tochigi SC	J3 League	32	8	0	0	32	8
2018	Tochigi SC	J2 League	40	6	0	0	40	6
Total			98	15	0	0	98	15
