= Kohei Yoshioka =

Japanese footballer

Personal information
- Full name: Kohei Yoshioka
- Date of birth: April 22, 1985 (age 41)
- Place of birth: Tokyo, Japan
- Height: 1.73 m (5 ft 8 in)
- Position: Midfielder

Youth career
- 2004–2007: Takushoku University

Senior career*
Years	Team	Apps	(Gls)
2008–2012	SC Sagamihara		
2013–2015	Grulla Morioka	47	(5)
2015	Fujieda MYFC	15	(0)
Total		62	(5)
- * Club domestic league appearances and goals

Kohei Yoshioka (吉岡 航平, Yoshioka Kohei; born April 22, 1985) is a former Japanese football player.

== Playing career ==
Kohei Yoshioka played for SC Sagamihara, Grulla Morioka and Fujieda MYFC from 2008 to 2015.
