= Yoshiki Yamamoto =

Japanese footballer

Personal information
- Full name: Yoshiki Yamamoto
- Date of birth: November 16, 1994 (age 31)
- Place of birth: Osaka, Japan
- Height: 1.70 m (5 ft 7 in)
- Position: Forward

Senior career*
Years	Team	Apps	(Gls)
2013–2015	Kataller Toyama	17	(0)
2014	→Verspah Oita (loan)	6	(0)
Total		23	(0)
- * Club domestic league appearances and goals

Yoshiki Yamamoto (山本 祥輝, Yamamoto Yoshiki; born November 16, 1994) is a former Japanese football player.

== Playing career ==
Yoshiki Yamamoto joined to Kataller Toyama in 2013. In 2014, he moved to Verspah Oita. In 2015, he returned to Kataller Toyama.
