= Yuki Okaniwa =

Japanese footballer

Yuki Okaniwa 岡庭 裕貴
Personal information
- Full name: Yuki Okaniwa
- Date of birth: January 3, 1995 (age 31)
- Place of birth: Tokyo, Japan
- Height: 1.72 m (5 ft 7 1/2 in)
- Position: Midfielder

Team information
- Current team: Tochigi City FC
- Number: 10

Youth career
- Hekizan SC
- –2012: Yokogawa Musashino FC

College career
| Years | Team | Apps | (Gls) |
| 2013–2016 | Tokyo University of Agriculture | | |

Senior career*
| Years | Team | Apps | (Gls) |
| 2017–2018 | Thespakusatsu Gunma | 51 | (1) |
| 2019 | Tokyo United FC | 18 | (3) |
| 2020– | Tochigi City FC | 149 | (25) |
- * Club domestic league appearances and goals as of 16 August 2026

Yuki Okaniwa (岡庭 裕貴, Okaniwa Yūki; born January 3, 1995) is a Japanese football player. He plays for Tochigi City FC.

== Career ==
Yuki Okaniwa joined J2 League club Thespakusatsu Gunma in 2017.

== Club statistics ==
Updated to 22 February 2020.

| Club performance | | | League | | Cup | | Total | |
| Season | Club | League | Apps | Goals | Apps | Goals | Apps | Goals |
| Japan | | | League | | Emperor's Cup | | Total | |
|---|---|---|---|---|---|---|---|---|
| 2017 | Thespakusatsu Gunma | J2 League | 36 | 1 | 2 | 0 | 38 | 1 |
| 2018 | Thespakusatsu Gunma | J3 League | 15 | 0 | 2 | 1 | 17 | 1 |
| 2019 | Tokyo United FC | JRL (Kantō, Div. 1) | 18 | 3 | – | | 18 | 3 |
| Total | | | 69 | 4 | 4 | 1 | 73 | 5 |
