= Masaya Nozaki =

Japanese footballer (born 1993)

Personal information
- Full name: Masaya Nozaki
- Date of birth: 3 August 1993 (age 33)
- Place of birth: Tokorozawa, Saitama, Japan
- Height: 1.76 m (5 ft 9 1/2 in)
- Position: Midfielder

Team information
- Current team: ReinMeer Aomori
- Number: 5

Youth career
- 2009–2011: Urawa Red Diamonds Youth

Senior career*
Years	Team	Apps	(Gls)
2011–2014	Urawa Red Diamonds	0	(0)
2014	→ Avispa Fukuoka (loan)	0	(0)
2015	Gainare Tottori	8	(0)
2016	YSCC Yokohama	28	(0)
2017	Nagano Parceiro	0	(0)
2018–	ReinMeer Aomori		
Medal record
Urawa Reds
Runner-up	J.League Cup	2011
Runner-up	J.League Cup	2013
- * Club domestic league appearances and goals as of 8 March 2018

Masaya Nozaki (野崎 雅也, Nozaki Masaya; born 3 August 1993) is a Japanese football player who plays for ReinMeer Aomori.

== Career statistics ==
Updated to 8 March 2018.

Club	Season	League		Emperor's Cup		J. League Cup		Total	
Club	Season	Apps	Goals	Apps	Goals	Apps	Goals	Apps	Goals
Urawa Red Diamonds	2011	0	0	1	0	0	0	1	0
Urawa Red Diamonds	2012	0	0	0	0	0	0	0	0
Urawa Red Diamonds	2013	0	0	2	0	0	0	2	0
Avispa Fukuoka	2014	0	0	1	0	-		1	0
Gainare Tottori	2015	8	0	2	0	-		10	0
YSCC Yokohama	2016	28	0	-		-		28	0
Nagano Parceiro	2017	0	0	2	0	-		2	0
Total		36	0	8	0	0	0	44	0
