= Hiroto Miyauchi =

Japanese footballer

Hiroto Miyauchi 宮内寛斗
Personal information
- Full name: Hiroto Miyauchi
- Date of birth: January 23, 1998 (age 28)
- Place of birth: Kanagawa, Japan
- Height: 1.72 m (5 ft 7 1/2 in)
- Position: Forward

Team information
- Current team: Verspah Oita
- Number: 7

Youth career
- 2013–2015: YSCC Yokohama Youth

Senior career*
Years	Team	Apps	(Gls)
2016–2017	YSCC Yokohama	8	(0)
2018–2019	Matsue City FC	44	(14)
2020–	Verspah Oita		
- * Club domestic league appearances and goals as of 20 February 2020

Hiroto Miyauchi (宮内 寛斗, Miyauchi Hiroto; born January 23, 1998) is a Japanese football player. He plays for Verspah Oita.

== Club statistics ==
Updated to 20 February 2020.

Club performance			League		Cup		Total	
Season	Club	League	Apps	Goals	Apps	Goals	Apps	Goals
Japan			League		Emperor's Cup		Total	
2016	YSCC Yokohama	J3 League	8	0	–		8	0
2017	YSCC Yokohama	J3 League	0	0	0	0	0	0
2018	Matsue City FC	J3 League	15	5	2	2	17	7
2019	Matsue City FC	JFL	29	9	1	0	30	10
Total			52	14	3	2	57	16
