= Keisuke Matsumoto =

Japanese footballer

Personal information
- Full name: Keisuke Matsumoto
- Date of birth: June 17, 1988 (age 38)
- Place of birth: Aichi, Japan
- Height: 1.74 m (5 ft 8 1/2 in)
- Position: Midfielder

Youth career
- 2004–2006: Nagoya High School

College career
Years	Team	Apps	(Gls)
2007–2010	Kwansei Gakuin University		

Senior career*
Years	Team	Apps	(Gls)
2011–2012	MIO Biwako Shiga	22	(0)
2013–2015	Grulla Morioka	32	(2)
Total		54	(2)
- * Club domestic league appearances and goals

Keisuke Matsumoto (松本 圭介, Matsumoto Keisuke; born June 17, 1988) is a former Japanese football player.

== Playing career ==
Keisuke Matsumoto played for MIO Biwako Shiga and Grulla Morioka from 2011 to 2015.
