= Tetsuya Koishi =

Japanese footballer

Personal information
- Date of birth: September 21, 1990 (age 36)
- Place of birth: Hyogo, Japan
- Height: 1.80 m (5 ft 11 in)
- Position: Midfielder

Team information
- Current team: Vonds Ichihara
- Number: 4

Youth career
- 2010–2013: University of Teacher; Education Fukuoka

Senior career*
Years	Team	Apps	(Gls)
2014–2015	Gainare Tottori	45	(0)
2016–	Vonds Ichihara		
- * Club domestic league appearances and goals as of 20 February 2016

Tetsuya Koishi (小石 哲也, Koishi Tetsuya; born September 21, 1990) is a Japanese football player. He plays for Vonds Ichihara.

== Playing career ==
Tetsuya Koishi played for J3 League club; Gainare Tottori from 2014 to 2015. In 2016, he moved to Vonds Ichihara.

== Club statistics ==
Updated to 20 February 2016.

Club performance			League		Cup		Total	
Season	Club	League	Apps	Goals	Apps	Goals	Apps	Goals
Japan			League		Emperor's Cup		Total	
2014	Gainare Tottori	J3 League	13	0	2	0	15	0
2015	Gainare Tottori	J3 League	32	0	2	0	34	0
Total			45	0	4	0	49	0
