= Kanazawa Seiryo University =

Private university in Ishikawa, Japan

Coordinates: 36°35′2.1″N 136°40′53.5″E

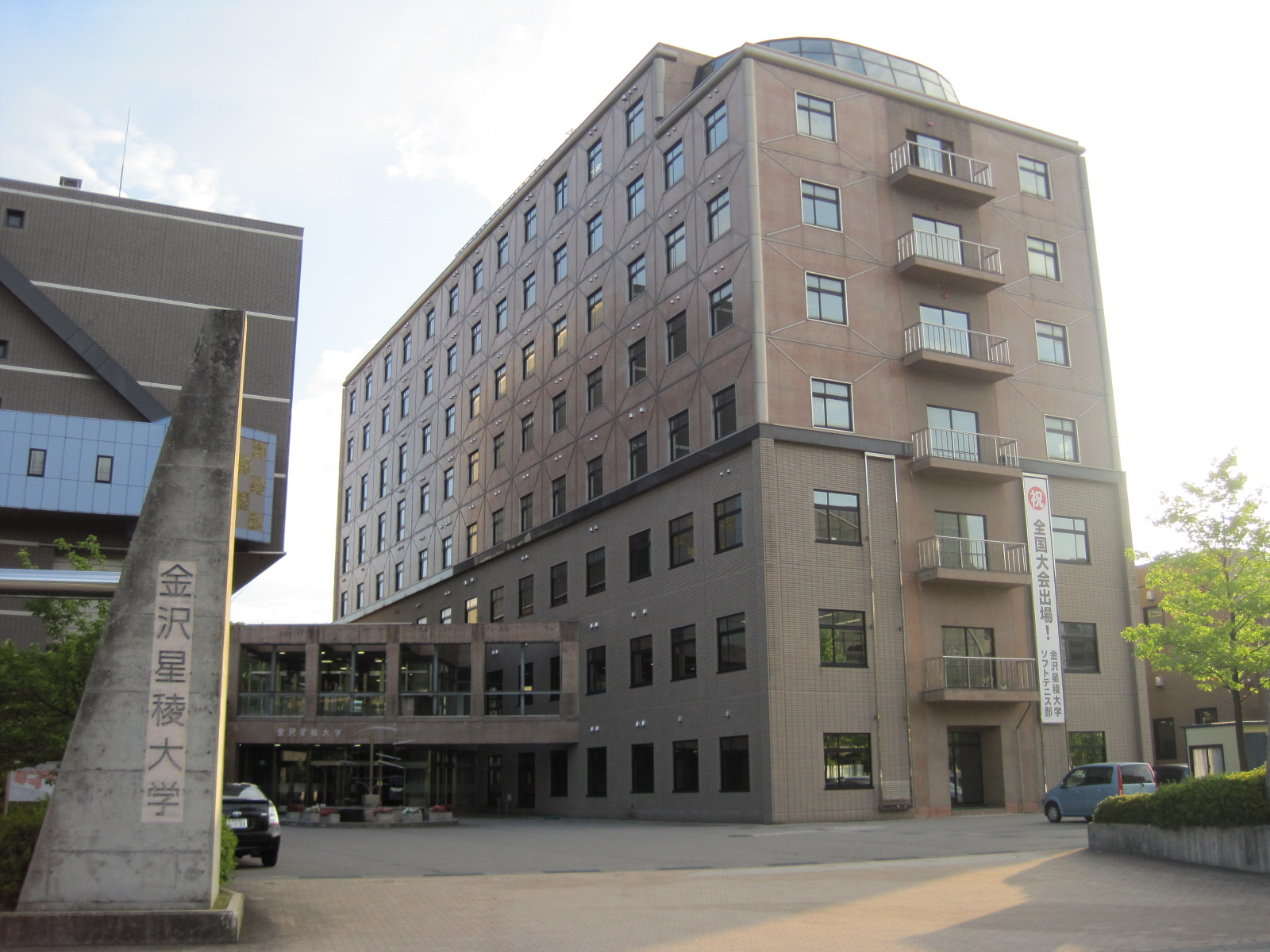
Kanazawa Seiryo University

Kanazawa Seiryo University (金沢星稜大学, Kanazawa Seiryō Daigaku) is a private university in Kanazawa, Ishikawa Prefecture, Japan.
