= 2019 Japan Football League =

Japan Football League
- Season: 2019
- Champions: Honda FC; 9th JFL title
- Promoted: FC Imabari
- Relegated: Ryutsu Keizai Dragons
- Matches: 240
- Goals: 623 (2.6 per match)
- Top goalscorer: Efrain Rintaro; Suzuka Unlimited (18 goals)
- Average attendance: 939

The 2019 Japan Football League (Japanese: 第21回日本フットボールリーグ(第21回 JFL 2019), Hepburn: Dai Nijūikkai Nihon Futtobōru Rīgu (Dai Nijūikkai JFL 2019)) was the sixth season of the nationwide fourth tier of Japanese football, and the 21st season since the establishment of Japan Football League.

Starting from this season, the league reverted to a one-stage double round-robin again.

== Clubs ==
JFL map 2019
JFL 2019 teams in Keihanshin

Sixteen clubs will feature in this season of Japan Football League. There were some changes: Vanraure Hachinohe won promotion to pro football in 2018, while Cobaltore Onagawa was relegated. There are two new clubs in the JFL, debuting in this category: Matsue City won the Regional Promotion Series, while Suzuka Unlimited came second in the final phase.

Club name	Home town	Position	Notes
FC Imabari	Imabari, Ehime	5th	J.League 100 Year Plan club status and J3 license holders
FC Osaka	Higashiōsaka, Osaka	2nd	
Honda FC	Hamamatsu, Shizuoka	1st	Defending champions of 2018
Honda Lock	Miyazaki, Miyazaki	14th	
Maruyasu Okazaki	Okazaki, Aichi	13th	
Matsue City	Matsue, Shimane	RPS 1st	Promoted from CSL after 1st place in 42nd Regional Promotion Series
MIO Biwako Shiga	Kusatsu, Shiga	7th	
Nara Club	All cities/towns in Nara (Note: centering on Nara)	8th	J.League 100 Year Plan club status and J3 license holders
ReinMeer Aomori	Aomori, Aomori	10th	J.League 100 Year Plan club status and J3 license holders
Ryutsu Keizai Dragons	Ryūgasaki, Ibaraki	15th	
Sony Sendai	Tagajō, Miyagi	4th	
Suzuka Unlimited	Suzuka, Mie	RPS 2nd	Promoted from TASL after 2nd place in 42nd Regional Promotion Series
Tegevajaro Miyazaki	Miyazaki & Shintomi, Miyazaki	12th	J.League 100 Year Plan club status
Tokyo Musashino City	Musashino, Tokyo	6th	J.League 100 Year Plan club status and J3 license holders
Veertien Mie	All cities/towns in Mie (Note: centering on Kuwana & Yokkaichi)	11th	
Verspah Oita	Yufu & Ōita, Ōita	9th	

=== Personnel and kits ===
Club	Manager	Captain	Kit manufacturer
FC Imabari	(Japan) Takeshi Ono		Adidas
FC Osaka	(Japan) Haruo Wada	(Japan) Tomoyuki Iwamoto	bonera
Honda FC	(Japan) Hiroyasu Ibata	(Japan) Yuya Suzuki	Umbro
Honda Lock	(Japan) Shinya Shirakawa	(Japan) Naoya Oyama	Kappa
Maruyasu Okazaki	(Japan) Ryuji Kitamura	(Japan) Keita Sugimoto	ATHLETA
Matsue City	(Japan) Koji Tanaka	(Japan) Yuzuru Tabira	GAViC
MIO Biwako Shiga	(Japan) Masafumi Nakaguchi		JOGARBOLA
Nara Club	(Japan) Koichi Sugiyama	(Japan) Shinichi Mukai	SQUADRA
ReinMeer Aomori	(Japan) Tatsuya Mochizuki	(Japan) Kanta Takahashi	Umbro
Ryutsu Keizai Dragons	(Japan) Yuji Nakano		Adidas
Sony Sendai	(Japan) Shinji Honda	(Japan) Kenta Ogihara	Umbro
Suzuka Unlimited	(Spain) Milagros Martínez Domínguez	(Japan) Toshihiro Horikawa	ATHLETA
Tegevajaro Miyazaki	(Japan) Keiji Kuraishi		Penalty
Tokyo Musashino City	(Japan) Hisayuki Ikegami	(Japan) Koji Ishihara	Yonex
Veertien Mie	(Japan) Nobuhiro Ueno	(Japan) Hitoshi Nishimura	Mizuno
Verspah Oita	(Japan) Shigemitsu Sudo	(Japan) Kosuke Fukumoto	LINES

== League table ==
Pos	Team	Pld	W	D	L	GF	GA	GD	Pts	Promotion
1	Honda FC (C)	30	19	6	5	59	30	+29	63	
2	Sony Sendai	30	16	7	7	60	34	+26	55	
3	**FC Imabari** (P)	30	13	12	5	41	26	+15	51	Promotion to 2020 J3 League (Note: To qualify for promotion, a club must hold a 100 Year Plan status, obtain a J3 license (marked in bold in the table), and finish both in the top 4 of the JFL, and either 1st or 2nd among the promotion-eligible clubs. Average home attendance of at least 2,000 is also required.)
4	**Tokyo Musashino City**	30	13	9	8	44	39	+5	48	
5	**Tegevajaro Miyazaki**	30	11	8	11	37	34	+3	41	
6	Honda Lock	30	10	11	9	41	39	+2	41	
7	Verspah Oita	30	10	10	10	42	36	+6	40	
8	FC Osaka	30	10	10	10	33	32	+1	40	
9	MIO Biwako Shiga	30	11	7	12	27	40	−13	40	
10	Veertien Mie	30	10	9	11	38	34	+4	39	
11	Maruyasu Okazaki	30	9	11	10	30	30	0	38	
12	Suzuka Unlimited FC	30	9	9	12	43	47	−4	36	
13	**ReinMeer Aomori**	30	9	9	12	40	44	−4	36	
14	**Nara Club**	30	8	10	12	27	32	−5	34	
15	Matsue City FC	30	5	10	15	26	51	−25	25	
16	Ryutsu Keizai Dragons (R)	30	5	6	19	35	75	−40	21	Relegation to regional leagues

Source: JFL website (in Japanese)
Rules for classification: 1) Points; 2) Goal difference; 3) Goals scored; 4) Head-to-head results; 5) Disciplinary points; 6) Draw
(C) Champions; (P) Promoted; (R) Relegated

== Top scorers ==
As of match played March 25, 2020.

Rank	Player	Club	Goals
1	(Brazil) Efrain Rintaro	Suzuka Unlimited	18
2	(Japan) Tsubasa Ando	Honda Lock SC	16
3	(Japan) Kazuki Sakamoto	MIO Biwako Shiga	14
4	(Japan) Yuta Uchino	Sony Sendai FC	12
4	(Japan) Hiroki Bandai	ReinMeer Aomori	12
6	(Japan) Masahiko Sugita	Sony Sendai FC	11
6	(Japan) Jin Shioya	Veertien Mie	11
8	(Japan) Yuki Mizutani	Tokyo Musashino City FC	10
9	(Japan) Daiya Tono	Honda FC	9
9	(Japan) Koji Ishihara	Tokyo Musashino City	9
9	(Japan) Hiroto Miyauchi	Matsue City	9

== Promotion from Regional Leagues ==
Iwaki FC and Kochi United SC won the promotion after coming in the Top 2 of the Final Round of the 2019 Regional Promotion Series.

== Attendances ==
Pos	Team	Total	High	Low	Average	Change
1	FC Imabari	46,512	3,981	1,694	3,101	+0.6%
2	Nara Club	30,308	5,102	513	2,021	+12.6%
3	Tokyo Musashino	26,866	5,284	504	1,791	+112.2%
4	FC Osaka	16,474	2,685	157	1,098	+39.3%
5	Veertien Mie	15,606	4,014	492	1,040	+22.5%
6	Tegevajaro Miyazaki	13,624	1,976	514	908	+125.3%
7	Honda FC	12,641	1,612	616	843	+2.9%
8	Matsue City FC	10,482	1,544	360	699	n/a
9	Suzuka Unlimited	8,301	1,308	312	553	n/a
10	MIO Biwako Shiga	8,292	1,523	206	553	+8.0%
11	Verspah Oita	7,549	1,148	253	503	−13.6%
12	Sony Sendai FC	6,629	709	253	442	−5.6%
13	Reinmeer Aomori	6,575	630	217	438	−14.6%
14	FC Maruyasu Okazaki	5,797	632	207	387	+8.7%
15	Honda Lock SC	5,169	837	168	345	+13.1%
16	Ryutsu Keizai Dragons	4,638	512	155	309	−32.8%
	League total	225,463	5,284	155	939	+3.5%

Updated to games played on 01/12/2019
Source: JFL
