= Tegevajaro Miyazaki =

Japanese football club

Tegevajaro Miyazaki テゲバジャーロ宮崎
- Full name: Tegevajaro Miyazaki
- Nickname: Tegevajaro
- Founded: 1965; 61 years ago
- Stadium: Ichigo Miyazaki Shintomi Football Stadium
- Capacity: 5,000
- Chairman: Kazuhiro Yanagida
- Manager: Yuji Okuma
- League: J2 League
- 2025: J3 League, 4th of 20 (promoted via play-offs)
- Website: tegevajaro.com
Home colours	Away colours

Tegevajaro Miyazaki (テゲバジャーロ宮崎, Tegebājaro Miyazaki) is a Japanese professional football club based in Miyazaki, the capital city of Miyazaki Prefecture. They play in the J2 League from 2026–27, Japanese second tier, after promotion from J3 in 2025.

== History ==
Born in 1965 as Kadokawa Club, the club have twice changed their name; first they became Andiamo Kadokawa 1965 in 2004 and MSU (Miyazaki Sportsmen United) FC in 2007. The current name came only in January 2015: Tegevajaro is a mix formed by tege, the Miyazaki dialect pronunciation of the word sugoi ("cool/amazing") and Spanish words vaca, pájaro ("cow", "bird"). In the logo, Miyazaki-jingū is visualised.

Tegevajaro Miyazaki aspired to join the J. League; they first aimed for the J3 League in 2017 season, but their first target was to reach the Japan Football League. Nobuhiro Ishizaki was chosen in 2017 to coach the club, while former J1 League players Yasuhito Morishima and Keiji Takachi signed for the team.

In the 2020 season, Tegevajaro finished in second position and were promoted to the J3 League for the first time in the club's history for the 2021 season. On 24 October 2023, Tegevajaro Miyazaki announced they were officially granted the J2 League License after approval of Club Licensing Board. On 14 December 2025, Tegevajaro Miyazaki secured promotion to J2 for the first time in their history, after defeating FC Osaka 4–0 in Axis Bird Stadium, Tottori via promotion play-off.

== League & cup record ==
Champions	Runners-up	Third place	Promoted	Relegated

League														J. League Cup	Emperor's Cup	Shakaijin Cup
Season	Division	Tier	Teams	Position	P	W (PK)	D	L (PK)	F	A	GD	Pts	Attendance/G	J. League Cup	Emperor's Cup	Shakaijin Cup
MSU (Miyazaki Sportsmen United) FC
2014	Kyushu Soccer; League	5	10	7th	18	3 (3)		10 (2)	23	54	-31	17		Not eligible	Did not qualify	–
Tegevajaro Miyazaki
2015	Kyushu Soccer League	5	10	2nd	18	11 (4)		3 (0)	47	13	34	41		Not eligible	Did not qualify	1st round
2016	Kyushu Soccer League	5	10	2nd	9	7 (0)		1 (1)	26	5	21	22		Not eligible	Did not qualify	1st round
2017	Kyushu Soccer League	5	11	1st	20	18 (1)		1 (0)	70	12	58	56		Not eligible	Did not qualify	2nd round
2018	Japan Football; League	4	16	12th	30	9	5	16	43	60	-17	32	404	Not eligible	2nd round	Not eligible
2019	Japan Football; League	4	16	5th	30	11	8	11	37	34	-3	41	908	Not eligible	–	Not eligible
2020	Japan Football; League	4	16	2nd	15	8	4	3	26	15	11	28	671	Not eligible	1st round	Not eligible
2021	J3 League	3	15	3rd	28	16	5	7	44	31	13	53	1,124	Not eligible	Did not qualify	Not eligible
2022	J3 League	3	18	9th	34	12	10	12	45	47	-2	46	1,268	Not eligible	Did not qualify	Not eligible
2023	J3 League	3	20	19th	38	9	12	17	31	52	-21	39	1,552	Not eligible	2nd round	Not eligible
2024	J3 League	3	20	15th	38	11	10	15	43	47	-4	43	1,165	1st round	3rd round	Not eligible
2025	J3 League	3	20	4th	38	19	10	9	61	45	16	67	2,413	1st round	Did not qualify	Not eligible
2026	J2 League	2	40	3rd	18	15	2	1	35	11	24	47	3,459	N/A		Not eligible
2026–27	J2 League	2	20	TBD	38									TBD	TBD	Not eligible

Key

- Tier = Level in Japanese football pyramid.
- P = Games played; W = Games won; W(PK) = Games Won by penalty kicks; D = Games drawn; L(PK) = Games Lost by penalty kicks; L = Games lost; F = Goals scored; A = Goals conceded; GD = Goals difference; Pts = Points gained
- Attendance/G = Average league home attendance
- Source: J.League Data Site

== Honours ==
Tegevajaro Miyazaki Honours
Honour	No.	Years
Miyazaki Prefecture Division 3	1	2004
Miyazaki Prefecture Division 1	3	2008, 2009, 2013
Kyushu Soccer League	1	2017
Miyazaki Prefectural Football Championship (Emperor's Cup Miyazaki Prefectural Qualifiers)	4	2018, 2020, 2023, 2024
J3 League Promotion Play-off winner	1	2025

== Current squad ==
As of 29 September 2026

Note: Flags indicate national team as defined under FIFA eligibility rules; some limited exceptions apply. Players may hold more than one non-FIFA nationality.

No.	Pos.	Nation	Player
1	GK	JPN	Shu Mogi
2	DF	JPN	Kaito Nagatomo
5	MF	JPN	Eisuke Watanabe
6	MF	JPN	Kenta Okuma
7	MF	JPN	Mahiro Ano
8	MF	JPN	Riku Yamauchi
9	FW	JPN	Keigo Hashimoto
10	MF	JPN	Ren Inoue
13	MF	JPN	Soichiro Tsutsumi
14	MF	JPN	Yoko Iesaka (on loan from Fagiano Okayama)
15	DF	JPN	Takashi Abe
16	DF	JPN	Ren Motoki
17	GK	JPN	Aoto Tokuwaka
18	FW	JPN	Ryo Sato
19	GK	JPN	Kenta Matsuyama

No.	Pos.	Nation	Player
20	FW	JPN	Shunei Kobayashi ^{DSP}
24	DF	JPN	Yuma Matsumoto
26	DF	JPN	Shigeo Miyawaki
28	DF	JPN	Hikaru Manabe
29	MF	JPN	Yudai Tanaka (on loan from Sagan Tosu)
31	GK	JPN	Ryoya Kimura (on loan from Yokohama F. Marinos)
33	DF	JPN	Kengo Kuroki
34	MF	JPN	Toshiki Kawai
38	MF	JPN	Hiroto Konishi
39	DF	JPN	Yota Shimokawa
42	FW	JPN	Ken Tshizanga Matsumoto
45	DF	JPN	Seitaro Tanaka
47	MF	JPN	Koji Okumura
82	MF	JPN	Shunya Sakai
99	MF	JPN	Kaiga Murakoshi

=== Out on loan ===
Note: Flags indicate national team as defined under FIFA eligibility rules; some limited exceptions apply. Players may hold more than one non-FIFA nationality.

No.	Pos.	Nation	Player
25	DF	JPN	Kota Yokokubo (at Giravanz Kitakyushu)
32	GK	KOR	Lee Chung-won (at FC Ryukyu)
40	MF	JPN	Rikuto Ando (at Nara Club)

No.	Pos.	Nation	Player
—	MF	JPN	Shuta Nakabeppu (at Nobeoka Agata)
—	FW	JPN	Jin Kihara (at Nobeoka Agata)
—	FW	JPN	Issa Tsukamoto (at Veertien Mie)

== Coaching staff ==
Position	Staff
Manager	(Japan) Yuji Okuma
Assistant coach	(Japan) Tomoya Takehana
First-team coach	(Japan) Kenichiro Meta
Goalkeeper coach	(Japan) Daisuke Kamon
Physical coach	(Japan) Hideaki Fujino
Chief trainer	(Japan) Nobuo Sakakiyama
Trainer	(Japan) Hayato Shigehisa
Physiotherapist	(Japan) Koji Sugawara
Side manager	(Japan) Yuta Haba

== Managerial history ==
Manager	Nationality	Tenure	
Manager	Nationality	Start	Finish
Nobuhiro Ishizaki	Japan	1 February 2017	21 Juny 2018
Keiji Kuraishi	Japan	22 June 2018	31 January 2021
Naruyuki Naitō	Japan	1 February 2021	31 January 2022
Yasushi Takasaki	Japan	1 February 2022	31 January 2023
Hiroshi Matsuda	Japan	1 February 2023	26 September 2023
Mitsuo Kato	Japan	27 September 2023	5 December 2023
Yuji Okuma	Japan	19 December 2023	Current

== Kit evolution ==
Home
2018 - 2020	2021	2022	2023	2024
2025	2026 -			

Away
2018 - 2020	2021	2022	2023	2024
2025	2026 -			

3rd - special
2025 3rd	2025; Black×Gold
