= Tochigi City FC =

Association football club in Japan

Tochigi City 栃木シティ
- Full name: Tochigi City Football Club
- Founded: 1947; 79 years ago as Hitachi Tochigi Soccer Club
- Stadium: City Football Station; Tochigi, Tochigi
- Capacity: 5,129
- Chairman: Takashi Ōkuri
- Manager: Naoki Imaya
- League: J2 League
- 2025: J3 League, 1st of 20 (champions, promoted)
- Website: tochigi-city.com
Home colours	Away colours

Tochigi City Football Club (栃木シティフットボールクラブ, Tochigi Shiti Futtobōrukurabu), commonly known as Tochigi City (栃木シティ, Tochigi Shitî Efushi) is a Japanese professional football club based in Tochigi City, Tochigi Prefecture. The club is set to play in the J2 League from 2026–27, the second tier of the Japanese football league system, after promotion from the J3 League in 2025.

== Origin name ==
In 2006, Tochigi was adopted the moniker Uva (meaning "grape" in Italian, Portuguese and Spanish). Grapes are a specialty in the area of Ohira Town.

== History ==
The club was formed in 1947 as Hitachi Tochigi Soccer Club, the works team of the local Hitachi, Ltd. affiliate. After finishing as a runners-up in the local Kanto Soccer League in 2009 season, they were promoted to the 2010 Japan Football League through the All Japan Regional Football Promotion League Series. Prior to their first season in the JFL, the club has dropped Hitachi prefix in its name and changed the reference to sport from "soccer" to "football". From the 2019 season, the club has adopted the new name as Tochigi City.

=== Promotion to Japan Football League ===
In 2023, Tochigi City secured promotion to the Japan Football League after defeating Tsukuba by 4–0 in final day of the 2023 Japanese Regional Football Champions League. They became the champions of the Japanese Regional Football Champions League for the first time, due to finishing second in Kanto Soccer League.

=== Promotion to J. League ===
On 24 September 2024, Tochigi City announced that it was officially granted a J3 League club license. On 17 November 2024, Tochigi City secured the 2024 Japan Football League championship and promotion to the J3 League for the first time in history after defeating Atletico Suzuka by 6–0, returning to the third tier after 11 years. Tochigi City would also compete in the Tochigi Derby against Tochigi SC. On 25 September 2025, Tochigi City announced a J2 League club license. On 23 November 2025, Tochigi City secured promotion to the J2 League for the first time in their history after defeating Nagano Parceiro by 3–0.

== League and cup record ==
Champions	Runners-up	Third place	Promoted	Relegated

League													Emperor's Cup	J. League Cup	Shakaijin Cup
Season	Div.	Tier	Teams	Pos.	P	W	D	L	F	A	GD	Pts	Emperor's Cup	J. League Cup	Shakaijin Cup
Hitachi Tochigi Soccer Club
2003	Kanto; Division 2	5	8	6th	14	4	0	10	25	55	-30	12	Did not qualify	Not eligible	-
2004	Kanto; Division 2	5	8	4th	14	6	3	5	24	19	5	21	Did not qualify	Not eligible	-
2005	Kanto; Division 2	5	8	3rd	14	7	4	3	28	18	10	25	1st round	Not eligible	-
Hitachi Tochigi Uva SC
2006	Kanto; Division 2	5	8	2nd	14	9	3	2	35	18	17	30	Did not qualify	Not eligible	–
2007	Kanto; Division 1	4	8	2nd	14	9	0	5	33	17	16	27	Did not qualify	Not eligible	–
2008	Kanto; Division 1	4	8	2nd	14	8	2	4	24	19	5	26	3rd round	Not eligible	–
2009	Kanto; Division 1	4	8	2nd	14	10	1	3	30	16	14	31	Did not qualify	Not eligible	–
Tochigi Uva
2010	Japan; Football; League	3	18	15th	34	7	10	17	41	75	-34	31	1st round	–	Ineligible
2011	Japan; Football; League	3	17	10th	33	12	9	12	40	43	-3	45	2nd round	–	Ineligible
2012	Japan; Football; League	3	17	17th	32	4	10	18	36	70	-34	22	Did not qualify	–	Ineligible
2013	Japan; Football; League	3	18	17th	34	9	3	22	34	64	-32	30	2nd round	–	Ineligible
2014	Japan; Football; League	4	14	13th	26	4	7	15	16	37	-21	19	1st round	–	Ineligible
2015	Japan; Football; League	4	16	16th	30	5	4	21	29	61	-32	19	1st round	–	Ineligible
2016	Japan; Football; League	4	16	15th	30	5	1	24	34	77	-43	16	1st round	–	Ineligible
2017	Japan; Football; League	4	16	16th	30	5	9	16	22	56	-34	24	2nd round	–	Ineligible
2018	Kantō; Soccer; League Division 1	5	10	1st	18	17	1	0	55	14	36	52	Did not qualify	–	
Tochigi City FC
2019	Kantō Soccer League Division 1	5	10	3rd	18	9	5	4	30	15	15	32	1st round	–	2nd round
2020 †	Kantō Soccer League Division 1	5	10	1st	9	7	2	0	25	6	19	23	1st round	–	Competition cancelled
2021	Kantō Soccer League Division 1	5	12	4th	22	14	2	6	45	26	19	46	2nd round	–	Competition cancelled
2022	Kantō Soccer League Division 1	5	10	1st	18	11	4	3	33	14	19	37	Did not qualify	–	Quarter final
2023	Kantō Soccer League Division 1	5	10	2nd	18	11	3	4	54	24	30	36	2nd round	–	1st round
2024	Japan Football League	4	16	1st	30	19	7	4	66	35	31	64	2nd round	–	Ineligible
2025	J3 League	3	20	1st	38	23	8	7	69	37	32	77	Did not qualify	1st round	Ineligible
2026	J2 League	2	40	29th	18	5	4	9	20	33	-13	21	N/A		Ineligible
2026–27	J2 League	2	20	TBD	38								TBD	TBD	Ineligible

Key

- Pos. = Position in league; P = Games played; W = Games won; D = Games drawn; L = Games lost; F = Goals scored; A = Goals conceded; GD = Goals difference; Pts = Points gained
- † Number of games played reduced by COVID-19 worldwide pandemic

== Honours ==
Honour	No.	Years
Tochigi Prefecture Division 1	10	1967, 1968, 1971, 1973, 1974, 1976, 1980, 1983, 1999, 2002
Tochigi Prefecture 2nd Division A	2	1989, 1990
Tochigi Prefecture Division 2	1	1991
Tochigi Prefectural Football Championship Emperor's Cup Tochigi Prefectural Qualifiers	11	2005, 2008, 2010, 2011, 2013, 2014, 2015, 2016, 2017, 2019, 2021
Kantō Soccer League	3	2018, 2020, 2022
Japanese Regional Football Champions League	1	2023
Japan Football League	1	2024
J3 League	1	2025

== Current squad ==
As of 1 August 2026

Note: Flags indicate national team as defined under FIFA eligibility rules; some limited exceptions apply. Players may hold more than one non-FIFA nationality.

No.	Pos.	Nation	Player
1	GK	JPN	Yoshinobu Harada
2	DF	CRO	Matej Jonjić
3	DF	JPN	Hayato Teruyama (on loan from V-Varen Nagasaki)
5	DF	JPN	Ryo Okui
6	MF	AUS	Joe Caletti
7	MF	JPN	Toshiki Mori
8	FW	JPN	Keita Yamashita
9	FW	JPN	Musashi Suzuki
10	MF	JPN	Yuki Okaniwa
11	FW	CHI	Byron Vásquez (on loan from Machida Zelvia)
13	MF	JPN	Takashi Oshima
15	DF	JPN	Yoshiki Sato
16	GK	JPN	Jun Kodama
17	DF	JPN	Tetsuya Chinen
18	MF	JPN	Masaru Kato

No.	Pos.	Nation	Player
20	MF	BRA	Pedro Augusto
22	DF	JPN	Hiroto Suzuki
23	FW	JPN	Atsushi Yoshida
24	FW	JPN	Kazuki Nishiya
28	DF	JPN	Keitaro Konishi
31	DF	AUS	Aidan Simmons
32	DF	JPN	Yuta Koike
33	DF	JPN	Takaya Inui
46	FW	JPN	Towa Nishimura ^{Type 2}
51	GK	JPN	Tomoya Murata
77	FW	JPN	Paulo Junichi Tanaka
88	FW	JPN	Yugo Masukake
93	FW	NOR	Tokmac Nguen
97	GK	KOR	Kim Jin-hyeon
99	FW	JPN	Masahide Hiraoka

=== Out on loan ===
Note: Flags indicate national team as defined under FIFA eligibility rules; some limited exceptions apply. Players may hold more than one non-FIFA nationality.

No.	Pos.	Nation	Player
—	DF	BRA	Carlos Eduardo (at (Brazil) Portuguesa)

== Club staff ==
As of February 2025

Position	Staff
Manager	(Japan) Naoki Imaya
Assistant manager	(Japan) Takuma Tsuda
Assistant manager	(Japan) Atsushi Izawa
Goalkeeper coach	(Japan) Yuki Takita
Strengthening coach	(Japan) Nobuaki Sekimura
Analyst	(Japan) Eishiro Hashiya (Japan) Kazuki Yokoyama (Japan) Kentaro Yoshihara
Kitman	(Japan) Masateru Hata
Doctor	(Japan) Hideyuki Sanuma (Japan) Masataka Hasue (Japan) Akinori Kimura (Japan) Tsuneari Takahashi (Japan) Takahiro Higashi (Japan) Yasuhiro Higai (Japan) Yuya Ogawa (Japan) Taisuke Sato

== Kit evolution ==
Home kits 1st
2019	2020	2021	2022	2023
2024	2025 -			

Away kits 2nd
2019	2020	2021	2022	2023
2024	2025 -			
