= J.League records and statistics =

Japanese football records

This page details J.League records.

== J1 League ==
=== Ranks ===
As of November 17th, 2026.

In bold the ones who are actually playing in J1. In italic the ones who are still active in other Japanese league.

Caps
#	Player	Caps	Career
1	**Shusaku Nishikawa**	673	2005–
2	Yasuhito Endo	672	1998–2012, 2014–2020, 2022
3	Seigo Narazaki	631	1995–2016, 2018
4	Yuji Nakazawa	593	1999–2018
5	Yuki Abe	590	1998–2010, 2012–2021
6	Hitoshi Sogahata	533	1998–2020
7	Mitsuo Ogasawara	525	1998–2006, 2007–2018
8	Shinzo Koroki	526	2005–2024
9	**Masato Morishige**	518	2006–2010, 2012–
10	Teruyoshi Ito	517	1993–2013
11	Nobuhisa Yamada	501	1994–2013
13	**Akihiro Ienaga**	498	2004–2010, 2012, 2014, 2016–
12	Tomokazu Myojin	497	1996–2016
14	Yoshito Okubo	477	2001, 2003–2004, 2006–2008, 2009–2019, 2021
15	Kengo Nakamura	471	2005–2020
16	**Kensuke Nagai**	467	2010–2012, 2013–
17	Satoshi Yamaguchi	448	1996–2011
18	Toshihiro Aoyama	444	2004–2007, 2009–2024
19	Yasuyuki Konno	443	2001–2002, 2004–2010, 2012, 2014–2019
20	**Shu Kurata**	434	2004–2010, 2011–2012, 2014–
21	Kazuyuki Morisaki	430	1999–2002, 2004–2007, 2009–2018
22	Ryoichi Maeda	429	2000–2013, 2015–2018
23	Toru Araiba	423	1997–2014
23	Kim Jin-hyeon	423	2010–2014, 2017–2025
25	Yoshikatsu Kawaguchi	421	1994–2001, 2005–2013

Goals
#	Player	Goals	Career
1	Yoshito Okubo	191	2001, 2003–2004, 2006–2008, 2009–2019, 2021
2	Shinzo Koroki	168	2005–2024
3	Hisato Sato	161	2000–2001, 2003, 2005–2007, 2009–2016, 2018
4	Masashi Nakayama	157	1994–2009, 2012
5	Ryoichi Maeda	154	2000–2013, 2015–2018
6	Marquinhos	152	2001–2011, 2012–2015
7	**Yu Kobayashi**	144	2010–
8	Kazuyoshi Miura	139	1992–1994, 1995–1998, 1999–2005, 2007, 2020–2021
9	Ueslei	124	2000–2005, 2006–2009
10	Juninho	116	2003–2013
11	Edmilson	111	2004–2011, 2012
12	Atsushi Yanagisawa	108	1996–2003, 2006–2014
13	Kazuma Watanabe	104	2005, 2007–2009, 2012, 2014–2021
14	Yasuhito Endo	103	1998–2012, 2014–2020, 2022
15	Patric	101	2013–2024
15	**Anderson Lopes**	101	2016–2017, 2019–2021, 2022–2025, 2026–
17	Toshiya Fujita	100	1994–2003, 2004–2008
18	Keiji Tamada	99	1999–2014, 2018
19	Yohei Toyoda	98	2004–2006, 2009, 2012–2017, 2018–2021
19	**Yuya Osako**	98	2009–2013, 2021–
21	Shoji Jo	95	1996–1999, 2000–2002
22	Nobuhiro Takeda	94	1993–2000, 2001
22	Hiroaki Morishima	94	1995–2001, 2003–2006
22	Tatsuhiko Kubo	94	1995–2007, 2009
25	Masahiro Fukuda	91	1993–1999, 2001–2002
25	Diego Oliveira	91	2016–2024
25	**Takashi Usami**	91	2009–2011, 2014–2016, 2019–

=== Individual ===
- Most career goals : 191 goals

(Japan) Yoshito Okubo

- Most career hat-tricks : 8 times

(Brazil) Ueslei

- Most career appearances : 672 appearances

(Japan) Yasuhito Endo

- Most goals in a season : 36 goals

(Japan) Masashi Nakayama (1998)

- Most hat-tricks in a season : 5 times

(Japan) Masashi Nakayama (1998)

- **Most goals in a game** : 5 goals

(Japan) Koji Noguchi for Bellmare Hiratsuka vs Kashima Antlers (3 May 1995)
(Brazil) Edílson for Kashiwa Reysol vs Gamba Osaka (4 May 1996)
(Japan) Masashi Nakayama for Jubilo Iwata vs Cerezo Osaka (15 April 1998)
(Brazil) / (Japan) Wagner Lopes for Nagoya Grampus Eight vs Urawa Red Diamonds (29 May 1999)

- Youngest player : 15 years 7 months and 22 days

(Japan) Maki Kitahara for FC Tokyo vs Kashima Antlers (1 March 2025)

- Youngest goalscorer : 15 years 11 months and 28 days

(Japan) Takayuki Morimoto for Tokyo Verdy 1969 vs JEF United Ichihara (5 May 2004)

- Oldest player : 54 years 12 days

(Japan) Kazuyoshi Miura for Yokohama FC vs Urawa Red Diamonds (12 March 2021)

- Oldest goalscorer : 41 years 3 months and 12 days

(Brazil) Zico for Kashima Antlers vs Jubilo Iwata (15 June 1994)

- Fastest goal : 8 seconds

(Japan) Hisato Sato for Sanfrecce Hiroshima vs Cerezo Osaka (22 April 2006)

- Fastest hat-trick : 3 minutes

(Japan) Yasuo Manaka for Cerezo Osaka vs Kashiwa Reysol (14 July 2001)

- **First scorer**

(Netherlands) Henny Meijer for Verdy Kawasaki vs Yokohama Marinos (15 May 1993)

- **First hat-trick**

(Brazil) Zico for Kashima Antlers vs Nagoya Grampus Eight (16 May 1993)

=== Club ===
- Most League championships : 9 times
  - Kashima Antlers (1996, 1998, 2000, 2001, 2007, 2008, 2009, 2016, 2025)
- Longest uninterrupted spell in J1: 34 seasons (1993-Present)
  - Kashima Antlers
  - Yokohama F. Marinos
- Most goals scored in a season : 107 goals
  - Jubilo Iwata (1998)
- Fewest goals scored in a season : 16 goals
  - Tokushima Vortis (2014)
- Most goals conceded in a season : 111 goals
  - Yokohama Flügels (1995)
- Fewest goals conceded in a season : 24 goals
  - Oita Trinita (2008)
- Biggest goal difference in a season : 68 goals
  - Jubilo Iwata (1998)
- Most points in a season : 108 points
  - Verdy Kawasaki (1995)
- Fewest points in a season : 13 points
  - Bellmare Hiratsuka (1999)
- Most wins in a season : 35 wins
  - Verdy Kawasaki (1995)
- Fewest wins in a season : 2 wins
  - Oita Trinita (2013)
- Most draws in a season : 16 draws
  - Shonan Bellmare (2021)
- Most losses in a season : 34 losses
  - Gamba Osaka (1995)
- Fewest losses in a season : 2 losses
  - Kawasaki Frontale (2021)
- Most goals in a game : 12 goals
  - Cerezo Osaka 5–7 Kashiwa Reysol (8 August 1998)
- Record win : 9–1, 8–0
  - Jubilo Iwata 9-1 Cerezo Osaka (15 April 1998)
  - Vissel Kobe 0–8 Oita Trinita (26 July 2003)
  - Shimizu S-Pulse 0–8 Hokkaido Consadole Sapporo (17 August 2019)
  - Yokohama F. Marinos 8-0 FC Tokyo (6 November 2021)
- Highest scoring draw: 5–5
  - Vissel Kobe 5–5 JEF United Ichihara (14 October 1998)
- Highest average home attendance in a season : 47,609
  - Urawa Red Diamonds (2008)
- Highest home attendance : 63,854 (regular season)
  - Yokohama F. Marinos 3–0 FC Tokyo (7 December 2019)
- 64,899 (Suntory Championship)
  - Yokohama F. Marinos 1–0 Urawa Reds (5 December 2004)

== J2 League ==
As of November 10, 2024.

=== Ranks ===
Updated to November 17th, 2026.

In bold the ones who are actually playing in J2. In italic the ones who are still active in other league.

Caps
#	Player	Caps	Career
1	Koji Homma	577	2000–2024
2	**Yuki Nakashima**	536	2006–2009, 2012–2014, 2016–2023, 2026–
3	Junki Koike	481	2009–2023
4	Kazumasa Uesato	476	2004–2007, 2009–2022
5	Yuki Matsushita	441	2003–2005, 2007–2017
6	Kazuki Kuranuki	435	2000–2005, 2007, 2008–2013
7	Koji Sakamoto	426	2000–2009, 2011–2012
8	Keiji Takachi	414	2005–2016
9	Yasunori Takada	407	2000–2010
10	Yuta Minami	400	2006, 2010–2019, 2021–2023
11	Kohei Kiyama	394	2006–2007, 2009–2011, 2012–2014, 2016–2022
12	Yuya Sato	392	2004–2005, 2006–2007, 2009–2020, 2022–2025
13	Kensuke Sato	388	2011–2019, 2021–2024
14	**Ryota Kajikawa**	387	2011–2012, 2014–
15	**Kazushi Mitsuhira**	380	2008, 2011–2015, 2017–2018, 2021–
16	Kazumasa Takagi	379	2003, 2005, 2008–2018
17	Makoto Sunakawa	376	2003–2007, 2009–2011, 2013–2015
18	**Hideomi Yamamoto**	375	2003–2005, 2008–2010, 2012, 2018–
19	Yusuke Tanaka	372	2004–2005, 2007–2010, 2012–2015, 2018–2019
20	Hisashi Jogo	371	2007–2010, 2012–2015, 2017–2020
21	Tetsuya Ōkubo	370	2003–2004, 2008–2010, 2012–2017
21	Kentaro Sato	370	2007–2008, 2012–2023
23	Atsushi Nagai	368	2000–2009
23	Kōichi Satō	368	2008–2019
25	Jun Suzuki	367	2007–2010, 2012–2015, 2017–2020
25	**Takumi Yamada**	367	2012–2014, 2016–

Goals
#	Player	Goals	Career
1	Masashi Oguro	108	2009–2010, 2014–2019
2	**Yuki Nakashima**	104	2006–2009, 2012–2014, 2016–2023, 2026–
3	Takayuki Funayama	96	2010–2011, 2013–2014, 2016–2021
4	Tetsuya Ōkubo	94	2003–2004, 2008–2010, 2012–2017
5	Koichi Sato	93	2008–2019
6	Peter Utaka	89	2018–2021, 2023–2024
7	Yoshihiro Uchimura	85	2007–2011, 2013–2016
7	Ken Tokura	85	2008–2009, 2013–2016, 2021–2023
9	Ibba Laajab	82	2016–2019, 2020–2021
10	**Kazushi Mitsuhira**	81	2008, 2011–2015, 2017–2018, 2021–
11	Yasunori Takada	76	2000–2010
11	**Daiki Watari**	76	2012–2017, 2023–
13	Junki Koike	75	2009–2023
13	Juanma Delgado	75	2017, 2019–2020, 2023–2025
15	Marx	74	2002–2004, 2006
16	Baré	71	2001, 2003–2005
17	Kazuki Hara	69	2012–2018
18	Hiroyuki Takasaki	68	2009, 2012–2013, 2016–2018, 2021
19	Paulinho	67	2005, 2007, 2010, 2013, 2015
19	Yuki Oshitani	67	2009–2011, 2013–2017, 2018–2020
21	Hisashi Jogo	66	2005, 2007–2010, 2012–2015, 2017–2020
22	Juninho	65	2003–2004
22	Teruaki Kurobe	65	2001, 2004, 2008–2013
22	Toyofumi Sakano	65	2015–2019, 2020–2023
22	Hiroaki Namba	65	2006, 2008–2018

=== Individual ===
- Most career goals: 108 goals

(Japan) Masashi Oguro

- Most career hat-tricks: 6 times

(Brazil) Juninho

- Most career appearances: 577 appearances

(Japan) Koji Homma

- Most goals in a season: 37 goals

(Brazil) Juninho (2004)
(Brazil) Hulk (2007)

- Most hat-tricks in a season: 3 times

(Brazil) Marcus (2003)
(Brazil) Juninho (2003)
(Brazil) Juninho (2004)
(Brazil) Hulk (2007)

- Most J2 titles : 4 titles

(Japan) Seiya Fujita (2007, 2014, 2017, 2020)

- **Most goals in a game** : 8 goals

(Kenya) Michael Olunga for Kashiwa Reysol vs Kyoto Sanga (24 November 2019)

- Youngest player : 15 years 10 months and 26 days

(Japan) Rikuto Hashimoto for Tokyo Verdy vs Avispa Fukuoka (28 February 2021)

- Youngest goalscorer : 16 years 5 months 5 days

(Japan) Keito Kumashiro for Roasso Kumamoto vs JEF United Chiba (30 March 2024)

- Oldest player : 52 years, 8 months and 29 days

(Japan) Kazuyoshi Miura for Yokohama FC vs Ehime FC (24 November 2019)

- Oldest goalscorer : 50 years and 15 days

(Japan) Kazuyoshi Miura for Yokohama FC vs Thespakusatsu Gunma (12 March 2017)

- **First scorer**

(Japan) Hayato Okamoto for FC Tokyo vs Sagan Tosu (14 March 1999)

- **First hat-trick**

(Japan) Koichiro Katafuchi for Sagan Tosu vs Consadole Sapporo (28 March 1999)

=== Club ===
- Most League championships : 3 times

Consadole Sapporo (2000, 2007, 2016)

- Most years in J2: 26 seasons (2000-2025)

Mito HollyHock

- Most goals scored in a season : 104 goals

Kawasaki Frontale (2004)

- Fewest goals scored in a season : 20 goals

Giravanz Kitakyushu (2010)

- Most goals conceded in a season : 98 goals

Ventforet Kofu (2001)

- Fewest goals conceded in a season : 22 goals

Consadole Sapporo (2000)
FC Tokyo (2011)

- Biggest goal difference in a season : 66 goals

Kawasaki Frontale (2004)

- Most points in a season : 106 points

Vegalta Sendai (2009)

- Fewest points in a season : 15 points

Giravanz Kitakyushu (2010)

- Most wins in a season : 34 wins

Kawasaki Frontale (2004)

- Fewest wins in a season : 1 win

Giravanz Kitakyushu (2010)

- Most draws in a season : 23 draws

Tokushima Vortis (2022)

- Most losses in a season : 34 losses

Ventforet Kofu (2001)

- Fewest losses in a season : 2 losses

Kashiwa Reysol (2010)

- Most goals in a game : 14 goals

Kashiwa Reysol 13-1 Kyoto Sanga (24 November 2019)

- Record win :

Kashiwa Reysol 13-1 Kyoto Sanga (24 November 2019)

- Highest scoring draw: 4-4

Tokushima Vortis 4-4 Giravanz Kitakyushu (22 August 2010)
Sagan Tosu 4-4 Yokohama FC (17 October 2010)
FC Gifu 4-4 Sagan Tosu (30 October 2011)
JEF United Chiba 4-4 Cerezo Osaka (1 April 2015)
FC Gifu 4-4 V-Varen Nagasaki (21 May 2017)
Omiya Ardija 4-4 Renofa Yamaguchi (26 August 2018)
SC Sagamihara 4-4 Mito HollyHock (3 October 2021)

- Highest average attendance in a season : 30,339

Albirex Niigata (2003)

- Highest attendance : 55,598

Shimizu S-Pulse 1-1 Yokohama FC (28 September 2024)

== J3 League ==
Updated to November 24, 2024.

=== Ranks ===
As of November 17th, 2026.

In bold the ones who are actually playing in J3. In italic the ones who are still active in another league.

Caps
#	Player	Caps	Career
1	**Hiroki Higuchi**	316	2015–
2	Kei Munechika	270	2015–2024
3	Naoyuki Yamada	262	2014–2020, 2022–2024
3	**Yu Tomidokoro**	262	2014–2018, 2023–
5	**Naoto Ando**	259	2014–2015, 2017–
6	**Yuta Togashi**	253	2015–2018, 2020–
7	Akio Yoshida	251	2014–2022
7	**Kota Hoshi**	251	2015–2020, 2022–2023, 2025–
9	Makoto Fukoin	241	2016–2020, 2023–2026
10	Takashi Akiyama	231	2015–2022
10	Kazuki Arinaga	231	2014–2021
12	Ryota Iwabuchi	229	2015–2022, 2024–2025
12	**Ryu Kawakami**	229	2017–2019, 2022–
14	**Rei Yonezawa**	223	2015–2018, 2020–2023, 2025–
15	Hayato Ikegaya	219	2016–2024
16	Naoki Sanda	216	2019–2025
17	**Takuya Sugai**	214	2017–
18	Takuya Sugimoto	213	2014–2022
19	Naoya Senoo	212	2016–2025
20	**Kensei Nakashima**	210	2020–
21	Ken Hisatomi	208	2014–2020
21	Yusei Kayanuma	208	2015–2018, 2020–2024
21	**Taku Ushinohama**	208	2016–2017, 2018, 2020–
24	Hiroto Yukie	205	2019–2025
25	Takuto Hashimoto	203	2014–2020

Goals
#	Player	Goals	Career
1	Tsugutoshi Oishi	73	2014–2016, 2019–2022
2	**Rei Yonezawa**	71	2015–2018, 2020–2023, 2025–
3	**Hiroki Higuchi**	70	2015–
4	**Hayato Asakawa**	66	2018–2021, 2023–
5	**Yuki Okada**	56	2022–
6	**Yuta Togashi**	54	2015–2018, 2020–
7	**Yu Tomidokoro**	52	2014–2018, 2023–
8	Keigo Hashimoto	49	2021–2025
8	**Kosuke Fujioka**	49	2021–2024, 2026–
10	**Shota Kawanishi**	48	2020–
11	**Hayate Take**	47	2018–2020, 2024–
12	Noriaki Fujimoto	44	2016–2017, 2023
13	Naoki Sanda	43	2019–2025
14	Kaito Taniguchi	42	2018–2020
15	Tsubasa Yoshihira	40	2016, 2018–2024
16	Yuichiro Edamoto	39	2014–2018, 2020–2021
16	Fernandinho	39	2014–2016, 2018–2020
16	**Yuya Taguchi**	39	2020–2024, 2026–
19	Yosuke Kamigata	38	2016–2017, 2019–2023
20	Takuma Sonoda	37	2017, 2018, 2020–2022
20	**Taku Ushinohama**	37	2016–2017, 2018, 2020–
20	**Shota Aoki**	37	2014, 2017–2019, 2025–
23	Tomohiro Tanaka	36	2015–2019
23	Marcus Vinicius	36	2023–2024
23	**Ryosuke Tamura**	36	2019–2020, 2022–

=== Individual ===
- Most career goals : 73 goals

(Japan) Tsugutoshi Oishi

- Most career hat-tricks : 3 times

(Japan) Tsugutoshi Oishi, (Brazil) Marcus Vinicius

- Most career appearances : 307 appearances

(Japan) Hiroki Higuchi

- Most goals in a season : 32 goals

(Japan) Kazuhito Kishida (2015)

- Most hat-tricks in a season : 2 times

(Japan) Kazuhito Kishida, (Japan) Takaki Fukimitsu (2015)
(Japan) Noriaki Fujimoto (2017)
(Japan) Tsugutoshi Oishi (2020)
(Japan) Keigo Hashimoto (2025)

- **Most goals in a game** : 4 goals

(Japan) Tsugutoshi Oishi for Fujieda MYFC vs Nagano Parceiro (30 March 2014)
(Japan) Koji Suzuki for Machida Zelvia vs J. League U-22 Selection (26 April 2014)
(Japan) Hiroki Higuchi for SC Sagamihara vs Fujieda MYFC (28 June 2015)
(Japan) Yuta Togashi for FC Ryukyu vs SC Sagamihara (10 June 2018)
(Japan) Naoki Sanda for Vanraure Hachinohe vs Kamatamare Sanuki (14 July 2019)

- Youngest player : 15 years 5 months and 1 day

(Japan) Takefusa Kubo for FC Tokyo U-23 vs Nagano Parceiro (5 November 2016)

- Youngest goalscorer : 15 years 10 months and 11 days

(Japan) Takefusa Kubo for FC Tokyo U-23 vs Cerezo Osaka (15 April 2017)

- Oldest player: 50 years, 2 months, 24 days

(Japan) Teruyoshi Ito for Azul Claro Numazu vs Matsumoto Yamaga (24 November 2024)

- Oldest goalscorer : 41 years 11 months and 11 days

(Japan) Hideo Hashimoto for FC Imabari vs Tegevajaro Miyazaki (2 May 2021)

- Fastest hat-trick : 10 minutes

(Japan) Naoki Sanda for Vanraure Hachinohe vs Kamatamare Sanuki (14 July 2019)

- **First scorer**

(Japan) Keisuke Endo for Machida Zelvia vs Fujieda MYFC (9 March 2014)

- **First hat-trick**

(Japan) Masao Tsuji for Zweigen Kanazawa vs YSCC Yokohama (29 March 2014)

=== Club ===
- Most League championships : 2 times
  - Blaublitz Akita (2017, 2020)
- Longest uninterrupted spell in J3: 12 seasons (2014-present)
  - Fukushima United FC
  - Gainare Tottori
  - Nagano Parceiro
- Most goals scored in a season : 96 goals
  - Renofa Yamaguchi (2015)
- Fewest goals scored in a season : 15 goals
  - YSCC Yokohama (2016)
- Most goals conceded in a season : 80 goals
  - Iwate Grulla Morioka (2024)
- Fewest goals conceded in a season : 18 goals
  - Machida Zelvia (2015)
  - Blaublitz Akita (2020)
- Biggest goal difference in a season : 60 goals
  - Renofa Yamaguchi (2015)
- Most points in a season : 85 points
  - Omiya Ardija (2024)
- Fewest points in a season : 20 points
  - YSCC Yokohama (2016)
- Most wins in a season : 25 wins

Renofa Yamaguchi (2015)
Omiya Ardija (2024)

- Fewest wins in a season : 4 wins
  - YSCC Yokohama (2014)
  - Gainare Tottori (2017)
  - Kamatamare Sanuki (2021)
- Most draws in a season : 18 draws
  - Nara Club (2024)
- Most losses in a season : 26 losses
  - Iwate Grulla Morioka (2024)
- Fewest losses in a season : 3 losses
  - Blaublitz Akita (2020)
  - Omiya Ardija (2024)
- Most goals in a game : 10 goals
  - FC Ryukyu 4-6 SC Sagamihara (8 November 2015)
  - YSCC Yokohama 5-5 Gamba Osaka U-23 (16 August 2020)
  - Kagoshima United FC 6-4 Gamba Osaka U-23 (13 December 2020)
- Record win :
  - Fukushima United FC 9-0 Iwate Grulla Morioka (28 April 2024)
- Highest scoring draw:
  - YSCC Yokohama 5-5 Gamba Osaka U-23 (16 August 2020)
- Highest average home attendance in a season : 8,489
  - Matsumoto Yamaga (2024)
- Highest home attendance : 16,027
  - Roasso Kumamoto 1-0 Gamba Osaka U-23 (7 September 2019)

== J. League Cup ==
As of March 5th, 2022

=== Ranks ===
As of September 10th, 2025.

In bold the ones who are actually playing in the J. League Cup. In italic the ones who are still active.

Caps
#	Player	Caps	Career
1	Nobuhisa Yamada	109	1994, 1996–2013
2	Yuzo Kurihara	85	2002–2019
3	Hitoshi Sogahata	83	1998–2020
4	Naoki Matsuda	82	1996–2010
4	Daisuke Nasu	82	2002–2019
6	Takeshi Aoki	78	2001–2017
6	Yuki Abe	78	1999–2006, 2008–2010, 2012–2021
6	Toru Araiba	78	1997–2014
6	Yasuhito Endo	78	1998–2003, 2005, 2007–2009, 2012, 2014–2020, 2022–2023
10	Teruyoshi Ito	77	1993–1994, 1997–2011, 2013
11	Yasuto Honda	75	1992–1994, 1996–2006
11	Ryoichi Maeda	75	2001–2006, 2009–2013, 2015–2018
13	Takuya Nozawa	74	1999–2017
13	Satoshi Yamaguchi	74	1996–2011
15	Norihisa Shimizu	73	1996–2011
16	Shinzo Koroki	72	2005–2024
16	Daigo Nishi	72	2006–2023
18	Go Oiwa	71	1996–2010
18	Teruyuki Moniwa	71	1998–2013, 2017
18	Seigo Narazaki	71	1996–2016, 2018
18	Yuhei Tokunaga	71	2003–2010, 2012–2019
22	Tetsuya Okayama	70	1992–1994, 1996–2006
22	Naotake Hanyu	70	2002–2016
22	Kazuma Watanabe	70	2009–2021
25	Tomokazu Myojin	69	1996–2016

Goals
#	Player	Goals	Career
1	Hisato Sato	29	2000–2001, 2003, 2005–2007, 2009–2016, 2018
2	Juninho	26	2005–2013
2	Masashi Nakayama	26	1994, 1996–2009, 2012
4	Akinori Nishizawa	25	1996–2000, 2003–2008
5	Marquinhos	24	2001–2015
5	Emerson	24	2000–2005
7	Yoshiyuki Hasegawa	23	1992–1994, 1996–2003
7	Kazuma Watanabe	23	2009–2021
7	Bismarck	23	1993–1994, 1996–2001, 2003
10	Edmilson	22	2004–2011
11	Ryoichi Maeda	21	2001–2006, 2009–2013, 2015–2018
11	Ueslei	21	2000–2009
11	Shinzo Koroki	21	2005–2024
14	**Shun Nagasawa**	19	2009–2010, 2014–2022, 2024–
15	Sho Ito	18	2010–2021
16	Kazuyoshi Miura	17	1992–1994, 1996–1998, 1999–2005, 2007, 2020–2021
16	Tatsuya Tanaka	17	2001–2018
18	Wagner Lopes	16	1993–2000, 2001
18	Tadanari Lee	16	2005, 2007–2009, 2010–2011, 2013, 2014–2019
20	Akihiro Nagashima	15	1992–1994, 1997–2000
20	Koji Yamase	15	2000–2012, 2024
20	**Yuya Osako**	15	2009–2013, 2021–
20	**Musashi Suzuki**	15	2012–2020, 2023–
24	Atsushi Yanagisawa	14	1996–2003, 2006–2014
24	Washington	14	2005–2007
24	Edílson	14	1996–1997, 2002–2003
24	Leandro	14	2005, 2007–2009, 2012, 2014–2018
24	Shoji Jo	14	1996–1999, 2000–2002
24	Tetsuya Okayama	14	1992–2006
24	Masanobu Matsunami	14	1993–2005
24	Kota Mizunuma	14	2007–2010, 2012–2024

=== Individual ===
- Most career goals : 29 goals

(Japan) Hisato Sato

- Most career appearances : 109 appearances

(Japan) Nobuhisa Yamada

- Most goals in a season : 9 goals

(Brazil) Washington (2006)

- **Most goals in a game** : 4 goals

(Japan) Shun Nagasawa for Gamba Osaka vs Nagoya Grampus (4 April 2018)
(Brazil) Washington for Urawa Red Diamonds vs Kawasaki Frontale (3 June 2006)
(Japan) Wagner Lopes for Shonan Bellmare vs Vegalta Sendai (19 March 1997)
(Brazil) Edílson for Kashiwa Reysol vs Vissel Kobe (8 March 1997)
(Brazil) Bismarck for Tokyo Verdy vs Gamba Osaka (3 August 1994)

- Youngest player : 15 years 10 months and 20 days

(Japan) Takayuki Morimoto for Tokyo Verdy vs Cerezo Osaka (27 March 2004)

- Youngest goalscorer : 16 years 9 months and 18 days

(Japan) Takefusa Kubo for FC Tokyo vs Albirex Niigata (14 March 2018)

- Oldest player : 54 years 2 months and 23 days

(Japan) Kazuyoshi Miura for Yokohama FC vs Urawa Red Diamonds (19 May 2021)

- Oldest goalscorer : 42 years 9 months and 9 days

(Japan) Yukio Tsuchiya for Ventforet Kofu vs Vissel Kobe (10 May 2017)

- **First scorer**

(Japan) Kazuyoshi Miura for Tokyo Verdy vs Kashima Antlers (16 October 1992)

=== Club ===
- Most League championships : 6 times
  - Kashima Antlers (1997, 2000, 2002, 2011, 2012, 2015)
- Most goals in a game : 10 goals
  - Shimizu S-Pulse 4.6 Nagoya Grampus (30 August 2000)
- Record win :
  - Cerezo Osaka 8-1 Avispa Fukuoka (3 July 1996)
  - Kashima Antlers 7-0 Consadole Sapporo (18 October 1997)
- Highest home attendance : 56,064
  - Kashima Antlers 1-0 Urawa Red Diamonds (4 November 2002)

== All-time J1 League standings ==
Pos	Team	Pld	W	D	L	GF	GA	GD	Pts	Played on 2026 at
1	Kashima Antlers	1134	616	183	335	1910	1317	+593	2031	J1 League
2	Yokohama F. Marinos	1134	554	201	379	1813	1382	+431	1863	J1 League
3	Urawa Red Diamonds	1104	500	209	395	1662	1430	+232	1709	J1 League
4	Nagoya Grampus	1100	488	187	425	1604	1509	+95	1651	J1 League
5	Gamba Osaka	1100	489	180	431	1780	1610	+170	1647	J1 League
6	Sanfrecce Hiroshima	1070	467	191	412	1550	1378	+172	1592	J1 League
7	Shimizu S-Pulse	1028	432	178	418	1456	1510	−54	1474	J1 League
8	Kashiwa Reysol	952	399	185	368	1393	1349	+44	1382	J1 League
9	Júbilo Iwata	886	401	150	335	1421	1238	+183	1353	J2 League
10	Kawasaki Frontale	756	382	167	207	1376	971	+405	1313	J1 League
11	FC Tokyo	842	347	184	311	1143	1079	+64	1225	J1 League
12	Cerezo Osaka	854	348	160	346	1259	1259	0	1204	J1 League
13	Vissel Kobe	904	326	190	388	1223	1348	−125	1168	J1 League
14	Tokyo Verdy	552	251	67	234	841	805	+36	820	J1 League
15	JEF United Chiba	578	227	70	281	874	980	−106	751	J1 League
16	Albirex Niigata	582	181	151	250	673	845	−172	694	J2 League
17	Shonan Bellmare	642	194	110	338	792	1085	−293	692	J2 League
18	Sagan Tosu	450	152	123	175	534	594	−60	579	J2 League
19	Vegalta Sendai	472	144	122	206	561	686	−125	554	J2 League
20	Kyoto Sanga	496	155	79	262	573	818	−245	544	J1 League
21	Omiya Ardija	408	129	104	175	455	579	−124	491	J2 League
22	Avispa Fukuoka	470	133	83	254	488	761	−273	482	J1 League
23	Hokkaido Consadole Sapporo	442	129	88	225	571	780	−209	475	J2 League
24	Oita Trinita	370	108	88	174	387	512	−125	412	J2 League
25	Yokohama Flügels	228	117	0	111	375	373	+2	351	Defunct
26	Ventforet Kofu	272	69	73	130	255	404	−149	280	J2 League
27	Yokohama FC	178	35	35	108	147	306	−159	140	J2 League
28	Machida Zelvia	76	36	18	22	106	72	+34	126	J1 League
29	Montedio Yamagata	136	30	36	70	108	199	−91	126	J2 League
30	Matsumoto Yamaga	68	13	20	35	51	94	−43	59	J3 League
31	Tokushima Vortis	72	13	11	48	50	129	−79	50	J2 League
32	Fagiano Okayama	38	12	9	17	33	42	−9	45	J1 League
33	V-Varen Nagasaki	34	8	6	20	39	59	−20	30	J1 League
34	Mito HollyHock	0	–	–	–	–	–	—	0	J1 League

Updated to match(es) played on 6 December 2025, after the end of the 2025 season. Team status as of 2026 Season. Source: J.League
