= Daisuke Inazumi =

Japanese footballer

Daisuke Inazumi 稲積 大介
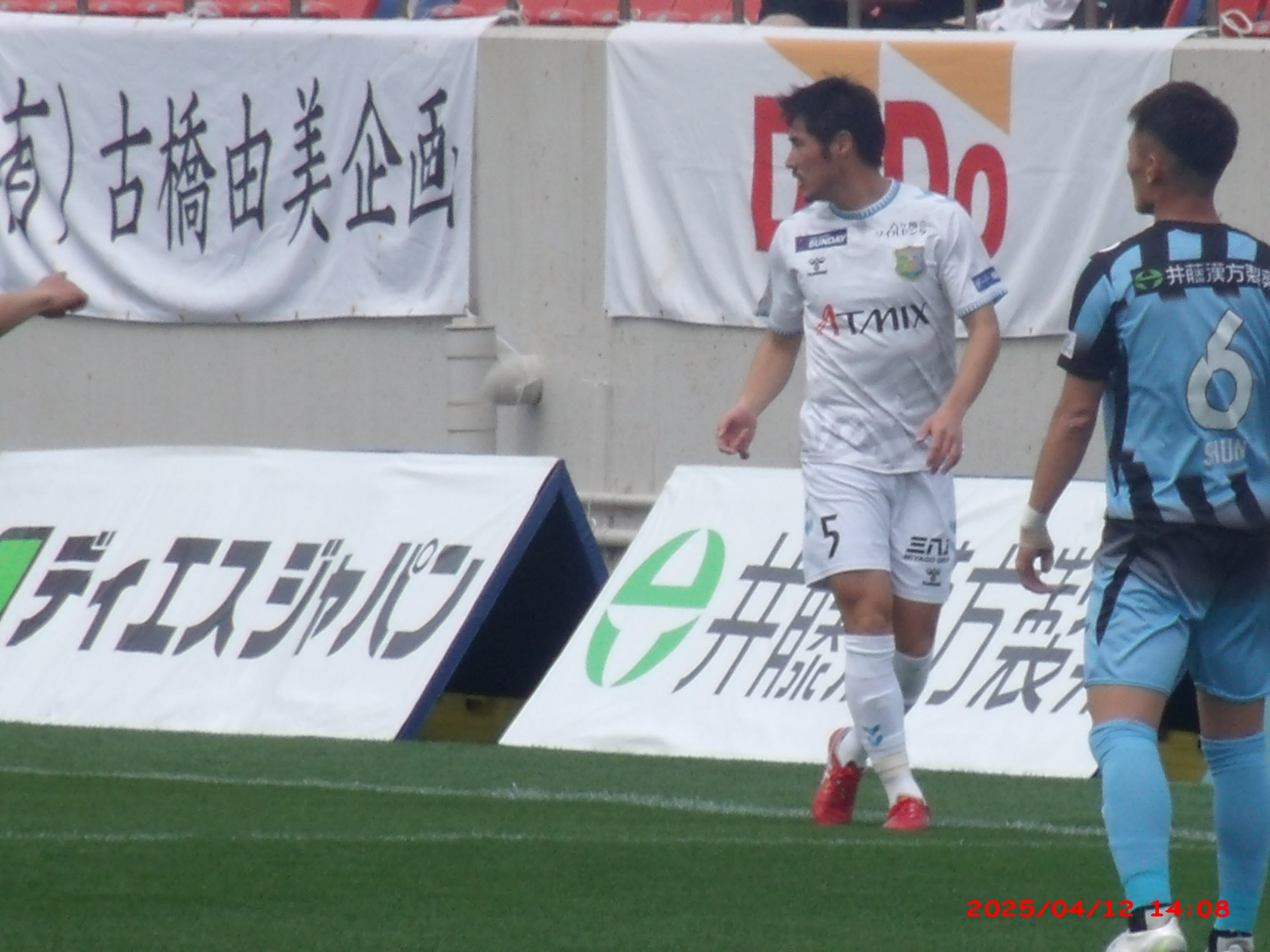

Personal information
- Date of birth: 8 May 1997 (age 29)
- Place of birth: Hyōgo, Japan
- Height: 1.72 m (5 ft 8 in)
- Position: Defender

Team information
- Current team: Vanraure Hachinohe
- Number: 5

Youth career
- –2012: Vissel Kobe
- 2013–2015: Takigawa Daini High School

College career
Years	Team	Apps	(Gls)
2016–2019	Nippon Sport Science University		

Senior career*
Years	Team	Apps	(Gls)
2020–2021	Fujieda MYFC	32	(2)
2022	Fujieda MYFC	26	(3)
2023–	Vanraure Hachinohe	91	(6)
- * Club domestic league appearances and goals as of 1 January 2026

Daisuke Inazumi (稲積 大介, Inazumi Daisuke; born 8 May 1997) is a Japanese footballer currently playing as a defender for Vanraure Hachinohe, who he joined in 2023.

== Career ==
In his youth, Inazumi played in the football teams of Vissel Kobe (U-15 level), Takigawa Daini High School and Nippon Sport Science University. He was graduated from university on 2019.

Inazumi signed his professional contract with Fujieda MYFC in 2020. He left the club in 2021 after two years at Fujieda.

Inazumi transferred to JFL club, Kochi United SC on 20 January 2022. He left the club after the end of the 2022 season.

On 17 December 2022, Inazumi joined to J3 club, Vanraure Hachinohe for upcoming 2023 season.

== Career statistics ==
=== Club ===
As of the end 2022 of season.

Club	Season	League			National Cup		League Cup		Other		Total	
Club	Season	Division	Apps	Goals	Apps	Goals	Apps	Goals	Apps	Goals	Apps	Goals
Fujieda MYFC	2020	J3 League	14	1	0	0	–		0	0	14	1
Fujieda MYFC	2021	J3 League	18	1	0	0	–		0	0	18	1
Kochi United SC	2022	Japan Football League	26	3	1	0	–		0	0	27	3
Vanraure Hachinohe	2023	J3 League	0	0	0	0	–		0	0	0	0
Career total			58	5	1	0	0	0	0	0	59	5
