= Miyao =

Miyao (written: 宮尾) is a Japanese surname. Notable people with the surname include:

- Ayaka Miyao, Japanese boxer
- Daisuke Miyao, academic
- Gaku Miyao (宮尾 岳, born 1959), Japanese manga artist
- Koichi Miyao (宮尾 孝一, born 1993), Japanese footballer
- Paulo Miyao (born 1991), Brazilian practitioner of Brazilian jiu-jitsu

== See also ==
- Miyao Castle, a former castle of Itsukushima, Hiroshima Prefecture, Japan
