= Tsugutoshi =

- Pronunciation: tsɯgɯtoɕi (IPA)
- Gender: Male

Origin
- Origin: Japanese
- Meaning: Different meanings depending on the kanji used

Other names
- Alternative spelling: Tugutosi (Kunrei-shiki) Tugutosi (Nihon-shiki) Tsugutoshi (Hepburn)

Tsugutoshi is a masculine Japanese given name.

== Written forms ==
Tsugutoshi can be written using different combinations of kanji characters. Here are some examples:

- 次敏, "next, agile"
- 次俊, "next, talented"
- 次利, "next, benefit"
- 次寿, "next, long life"
- 次年, "next, year"
- 嗣敏, "succession, agile"
- 嗣俊, "succession, talented"
- 嗣利, "succession, benefit"
- 嗣寿, "succession, long life"
- 嗣年, "succession, year"
- 継敏, "continue, agile"
- 継俊, "continue, talented"
- 継利, "continue, benefit"
- 継寿, "continue, long life"
- 継年, "continue, year"

The name can also be written in hiragana つぐとし or katakana ツグトシ.

== Notable people with the name ==
- Tsugutoshi Gotō (後藤 次利; born 1952), Japanese musician
- Tsugutoshi Oishi (大石 治寿; born 1990), Japanese footballer
