= Naoyuki Yamada =

Japanese footballer

Naoyuki Yamada 山田 尚幸
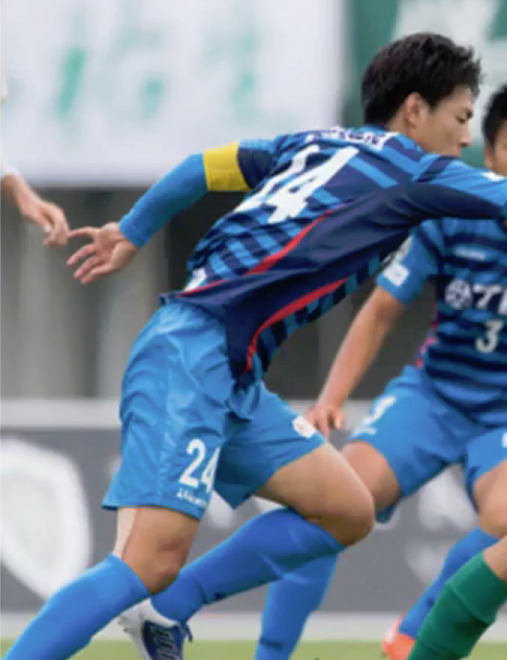

Personal information
- Full name: Naoyuki Yamada
- Date of birth: December 26, 1987 (age 38)
- Place of birth: Hirakata, Osaka, Japan
- Height: 1.77 m (5 ft 9 1/2 in)
- Position: Defender

Youth career
- 2006–2009: Biwako Seikei Sport College

Senior career*
Years	Team	Apps	(Gls)
2010–2012	MIO Biwako Shiga	89	(2)
2013–2021	Blaublitz Akita	211	(3)
2022–	Vanraure Hachinohe	45	(3)
- * Club domestic league appearances and goals as of 29 August 2023

Naoyuki Yamada (山田 尚幸, Yamada Naoyuki; born December 26, 1987 in Osaka) is a retired Japanese football player whose last club was Vanraure Hachinohe.

== Playing career ==
Naoyuki Yamada joined MIO Biwako Shiga in 2010. In 2013, he moved to Blaublitz Akita.

== Club statistics ==
Updated to 26 December 2021.

Club performance			League		Cup		Total	
Season	Club	League	Apps	Goals	Apps	Goals	Apps	Goals
Japan			League		Emperor's Cup		Total	
2009	Biwako Seikei	-	0	0	1	0	1	0
2010	MIO Biwako Shiga	JFL	28	0	2	0	30	0
2011	MIO Biwako Shiga	JFL	29	2	–		29	2
2012	MIO Biwako Shiga	JFL	32	0	–		32	0
2013	Blaublitz Akita	JFL	6	0	0	0	6	0
2014	Blaublitz Akita	J3 League	27	0	2	0	29	0
2015	Blaublitz Akita	J3 League	31	0	2	0	33	0
2016	Blaublitz Akita	J3 League	30	2	2	0	32	2
2017	Blaublitz Akita	J3 League	29	0	1	0	30	0
2018	Blaublitz Akita	J3 League	18	0	1	0	19	0
2019	Blaublitz Akita	J3 League	31	1	1	0	32	1
2020	Blaublitz Akita	J3 League	31	0	2	0	33	0
2021	Blaublitz Akita	J2 League	8	0	1	0	9	0
2022	Vanraure Hachinohe	J3 League	0	0	0	0	0	0
Total			300	5	16	0	315	5

== Honours ==
Blaublitz Akita

- J3 League (2): 2017, 2020
