= Hiroto Yukie =

Japanese footballer

Personal information
- Date of birth: 9 June 1996 (age 30)
- Place of birth: Sōka, Saitama, Japan
- Height: 1.74 m (5 ft 9 in)
- Positions: Defender; forward

Team information
- Current team: Vanraure Hachinohe
- Number: 11

Youth career
- Matsubara FC
- –2011: Misato FC
- 2012–2014: Shutoku High School

College career
Years	Team	Apps	(Gls)
2015–2018	Rissho University		

Senior career*
Years	Team	Apps	(Gls)
2019–2023	Fukushima United	146	(10)
2024–	Vanraure Hachinohe	81	(3)
- * Club domestic league appearances and goals as of 13 August 2026

Hiroto Yukie (雪江 悠人, Yukie Hiroto; born 9 June 1996) is a Japanese footballer currently playing as a defender or forward for Vanraure Hachinohe.

== Career statistics ==
=== Club ===
As of 28 March 2021.

Club	Season	League			National Cup		League Cup		Other		Total	
Club	Season	Division	Apps	Goals	Apps	Goals	Apps	Goals	Apps	Goals	Apps	Goals
Fukushima United	2019	J3 League	29	2	0	0	–		0	0	29	2
Fukushima United	2020	J3 League	33	1	0	0	–		0	0	33	1
Fukushima United	2021	J3 League	24	0	0	0	–		0	0	24	0
Fukushima United	2022	J3 League	28	0	2	0	–		0	0	30	0
Career total			65	3	0	0	0	0	0	0	116	3
