= Naoki Sanda =

Japanese footballer (born 1992)

Naoki Sanda 三田 尚希
Personal information
- Full name: Naoki Sanda
- Date of birth: 16 August 1992 (age 34)
- Place of birth: Kiso, Nagano, Japan
- Height: 1.65 m (5 ft 5 in)
- Position: Midfielder

Team information
- Current team: Nagano Parceiro
- Number: 14

Youth career
- 2005–2007: Agematsu Junior High School
- 2008–2010: Aomori Yamada High School

College career
Years	Team	Apps	(Gls)
2011–2014	Hosei University		

Senior career*
Years	Team	Apps	(Gls)
2015–2016	ReinMeer Aomori	29	(6)
2017–2018	FC Imabari	56	(14)
2019	Vanraure Hachinohe	33	(10)
2020–	Nagano Parceiro	175	(33)
- * Club domestic league appearances and goals as of January 1st, 2026

Naoki Sanda (三田 尚希, Sanda Naoki; born 16 August 1992) is a Japanese footballer currently playing as a midfielder for Nagano Parceiro.

== Career statistics ==
=== Club ===
Updated to January 1st, 2022.

Club	Season	League			Cup		League Cup		Other		Total	
Club	Season	Division	Apps	Goals	Apps	Goals	Apps	Goals	Apps	Goals	Apps	Goals
ReinMeer Aomori	2016	JFL	29	6	0	0	–		0	0	29	6
FC Imabari	2017	JFL	29	8	2 (Note: Appearances in the Emperor's Cup)	0	–		0	0	31	8
FC Imabari	2018	JFL	27	6	2	0	–		0	0	29	6
Vanraure Hachinohe	2019	J3 League	33	10	3	0	–		0	0	36	10
Nagano Parceiro	2020	J3 League	24	8	0	0	–		0	0	24	8
Nagano Parceiro	2021	J3 League	28	9	1	0	–		0	0	29	9
Career total			170	47	8	0	0	0	0	0	178	47
