= Yuta Takahashi (disambiguation) =

Yuta, Yūta, or Yuuta Takahashi may refer to:

- Shirokuma Yūta, born 1999 as Yūta Takahashi (高橋 優太, Takahashi Yūta), Japanese sumo wrestler
- Yuta Takahashi, (高橋 勇太, Takahashi Yūta; born 1998) Japanese footballer
- Yūta Takahashi, (高橋 優太, Takahashi Yūta; born 1984), Japanese actor, entertainer and model
- Yuuta Takahashi (Magic: The Gathering player), (高橋 優太, Takahashi Yūta) Japanese Magic: The Gathering player
