= Tomoya Kitamura =

Japanese footballer

Personal information
- Full name: Tomoya Kitamura
- Date of birth: 15 September 1996 (age 30)
- Place of birth: Kumamoto, Japan
- Height: 1.64 m (5 ft 5 in)
- Position: Forward

Team information
- Current team: Tegevajaro Miyazaki
- Number: 13

Youth career
- 2012–2014: Hosho High School

College career
Years	Team	Apps	(Gls)
2015–2018	Miyazaki Sangyo-keiei University		

Senior career*
Years	Team	Apps	(Gls)
2019–2021	Roasso Kumamoto	45	(11)
2022–	Tegevajaro Miyazaki	57	(5)
- * Club domestic league appearances and goals as of 21:54, 1 December 2023 (UTC)

Tomoya Kitamura (北村 知也, Kitamura Tomoya; born 15 September 1996) is a Japanese footballer currently playing as a forward for Tegevajaro Miyazaki.

== Early life ==
Tomoya was born in Kumamoto. He went to Miyazaki Sangyo-keiei University.

== Career ==
Tomoya made his debut for Roasso Kumamoto against Iwate Grulla Morioka on 31 March 2019. He scored his first goal for the club against Gamba Osaka II on 13 April 2019.

Tomoya made his debut for Tegevajaro against Sagamihara on 26 March 2023. He scored his first goal for the club against Ehime on 27 October 2022, scoring in the 8th minute.

== Career statistics ==
=== Club ===
As of 10 November 2020.

Club	Season	League			National Cup		League Cup		Other		Total	
Club	Season	Division	Apps	Goals	Apps	Goals	Apps	Goals	Apps	Goals	Apps	Goals
Roasso Kumamoto	2019	J3 League	28	11	1 (Note: Appearances in the Emperor's Cup)	0	–		0	0	29	11
Roasso Kumamoto	2020	J3 League	3	0	0	0	–		0	0	3	0
Career total			31	11	1	0	0	0	0	0	32	11

== Honours ==
Roasso Kumamoto

- J3 League (2021)
