= Tsubasa Yoshihira =

Japanese footballer

Tsubasa Yoshihira 吉平 翼
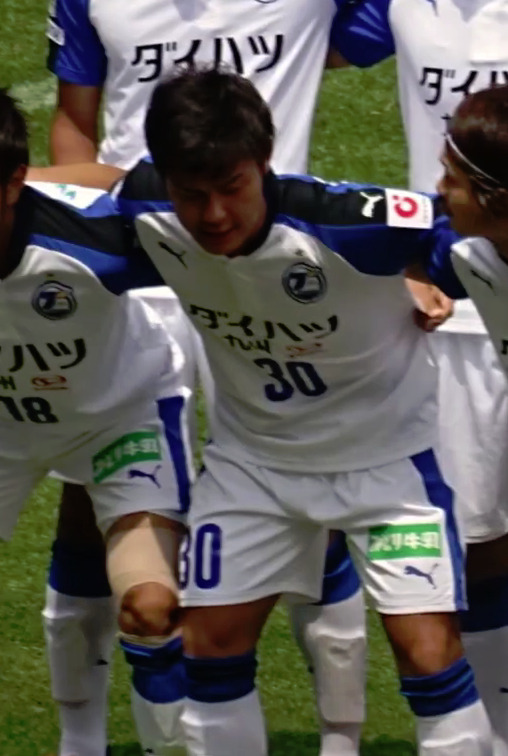

Personal information
- Full name: Tsubasa Yoshihira
- Date of birth: 5 January 1998 (age 28)
- Place of birth: Ōita, Japan
- Height: 1.72 m (5 ft 8 in)
- Position: Forward

Team information
- Current team: Kataller Toyama
- Number: 9

Youth career
- –2015: Oita Trinita

Senior career*
Years	Team	Apps	(Gls)
2015–2019	Oita Trinita	21	(2)
2018	→ Blaublitz Akita (loan)	17	(0)
2019	→ Fujieda MYFC (loan)	1	(2)
2020	Fujieda MYFC	30	(11)
2021–	Kataller Toyama	157	(32)
- * Club domestic league appearances and goals as of 16 August 2026

Tsubasa Yoshihira (吉平 翼, Yoshihira Tsubasa; born 5 January 1998) is a Japanese footballer who plays for Kataller Toyama.

== Club statistics ==
Updated to 2 January 2022.

Appearances and goals by club, season and competition
Club	Season	League			Emperor's Cup		J. League Cup		Total	
Club	Season	Division	Apps	Goals	Apps	Goals	Apps	Goals	Apps	Goals
Oita Trinita	2015	J2 League	4	0	1	0	-		5	0
Oita Trinita	2016	J3 League	13	2	3	2	-		16	4
Oita Trinita	2017	J2 League	4	0	2	0	-		6	0
Blaublitz Akita	2018	J3 League	17	0	1	0	-		18	0
Fujieda MYFC	2019	J3 League	1	2	-		-		1	2
Fujieda MYFC	2020	J3 League	30	11	-		-		30	11
Kataller Toyama	2021	J3 League	26	3	1	0	-		27	3
Kataller Toyama	2022	J3 League	0	0	0	0	-		0	0
Career total			95	18	8	2	0	0	103	20
