= Fukui United FC =

Japanese football club

Fukui United FC 福井ユナイテッドFC
- Full name: Fukui United Football Club
- Founded: 11 January 2019; 7 years ago
- Stadium: Technoport Fukui Stadium; Fukui, Fukui
- Capacity: 21,053
- Chairman: Junichi Hattori
- Manager: Shinji Fujiyoshi
- League: Hokushinetsu Football League
- 2025: 2nd of 8
- Website: fukuiunited.co.jp
Home colours	Away colours

Fukui United FC (福井ユナイテッドFC, Fukui Yunaiteddo Efu Sī) is a football (soccer) club based in Fukui, the capital city of Fukui Prefecture in Japan. They play in the Hokushinetsu Football League, which is part of Japanese Regional Leagues. They were founded in 2019 to take the place of their dissolved predecessor, Saurcos Fukui (サウルコス福井, Saurukosu Fukui).

== History ==
=== Saurcos Fukui (2006–2018) ===
The club was born on September 28, 2006, from the merger of FC Kanazu (from Kanazu, now part of Awara) and Maruoka Phoenix (from Maruoka, now part of Fukui city). The name Saurcos comes from the combination of two English words: saur from "dinosaur" and cos from "corps", referring to army corps. It was chosen between three possible choices after a poll between fans, linking also with their mascot, the Fukuiraptor, a dinosaur lived in Japan during the Cretaceous. The logo also presents the Narcissus, a plant typical of this region. The near city of Awara hosts the club's training sessions.

After an immediate promotion from 2nd division of Hokushinetsu Football League, Saurcos Fukui has been in first tier for a decade, waiting for a chance to snatch a spot in Japan Football League. They have participated eight times in the Emperor's Cup, going as far as the second round on four occasions.

=== Fukui United FC (2019–) ===
After the 2018 season, Saurcos Fukui has been dissolved taken by successor of Fukui United FC was founded in 2019 by volunteers from Fukui Prefecture, led by the Fukui Prefectural Football Association, as a company that will take over the Saurcos Fukui management corporation " NPO Fukui J League Team Creation Association " that was disbanded in 2018 due to financial difficulties. Co., Ltd. was established on January 11, 2019, at a press conference on January 26, 2019, the new team's name was Fukui United Football Club, and it was announced that it would start in earnest from February 1. It was announced that Kazuo Yoshimura will be appointed as the president of Fukui United Co., Ltd., which will be the operating company, and Junichi Hattori, who was the GM of FC Gifu and V-Varen Nagasaki, will be appointed as the general manager (GM). The club will play their sixth consecutive season at the Hokushi'netsu Football League on 2024.

== League record ==
Champions	Runners-up	Third place	Promoted	Relegated

League											Emperor's Cup
Season	League	Pos.	P	W	D	L	F	A	GD	Pts	Emperor's Cup
FC Kanazu
2002	Fukui Prefecture; Division 1	1st									Did not qualify
2003	Fukui Prefecture; Division 1										Did not qualify
2004	Fukui Prefecture; Division 1	1st	9	9	0	0			38	27	Did not qualify
2005	Hokushin'etsu Football; League (Div. 2)	6th	13	7	3	3	25	15	10	24	Did not qualify
2006	Hokushin'etsu Football; League (Div. 2)	2nd	14	6	4	4	25	16	9	22	Did not qualify
Saurcos Fukui
2007	Hokushin'etsu Football; League (Div. 2)	2nd	14	9	1	4	28	13	15	28	Did not qualify
2008	Hokushin'etsu Football; League (Div. 1)	7th	14	2	3	9	18	41	-23	9	2nd round
2009	Hokushin'etsu Football; League (Div. 1)	5th	14	3	1	10	15	41	-26	10	1st round
2010	Hokushin'etsu Football; League (Div. 1)	5th	14	5	1	8	18	43	-25	16	1st round
2011	Hokushin'etsu Football; League (Div. 1)	4th	14	5	5	4	22	18	4	20	Did not qualify
2012	Hokushin'etsu Football; League (Div. 1)	1st	14	12	1	1	56	7	49	37	2nd round
2013	Hokushin'etsu Football; League (Div. 1)	1st	14	12	2	0	43	7	36	38	2nd round
2014	Hokushin'etsu Football; League (Div. 1)	1st	14	13	0	1	48	5	43	39	2nd round
2015	Hokushin'etsu Football; League (Div. 1)	1st	14	12	0	2	48	5	43	36	1st round
2016	Hokushin'etsu Football; League (Div. 1)	2nd	14	11	2	1	45	4	41	35	1st round
2017	Hokushin'etsu Football; League (Div. 1)	1st	14	11	2	1	55	5	50	35	1st round
2018	Hokushin'etsu Football; League (Div. 1)	1st	14	12	2	0	61	8	53	38	1st round
Fukui United
2019	Hokushin'etsu Football; League (Div. 1)	1st	14	13	1	0	74	7	67	40	1st round
2020 †	Hokushin'etsu Football; League (Div. 1)	1st	7	7	0	0	18	4	14	21	5th round
2021	Hokushin'etsu Football; League (Div. 1)	1st	16	13	1	2	48	15	33	40	3rd round
2022	Hokushin'etsu Football; League (Div. 1)	3rd	14	9	1	4	38	16	22	28	1st round
2023	Hokushin'etsu Football; League (Div. 1)	1st	14	10	3	1	34	9	25	33	1st round
2024	Hokushin'etsu Football; League (Div. 1)	1st	14	14	0	0	64	7	57	42	1st round
2025	Hokushin'etsu Football; League (Div. 1)	2nd	14	11	1	2	56	9	47	34	2nd round
2026	Hokushin'etsu Football; League (Div. 1)	TBD	14								TBD

Key

- Pos. = Position in league; P = Games played; W = Games won; D = Games drawn; L = Games lost; F = Goals scored; A = Goals conceded; GD = Goals difference; Pts = Points gained
- † Number of games played reduced by COVID-19 worldwide pandemic

== Honours ==
Championship winners
Honour	No.	Years
Fukui Prefecture Division 1	2	2002, 2004
Hokushinetsu Division 1	11	2012, 2013, 2014, 2015, 2017, 2018, 2019, 2020, 2021, 2023, 2024
Fukui Prefectural Football Championship Emperor's Cup Fukui Prefectural Qualifiers	17	2008, 2009, 2010, 2012, 2013, 2014, 2015, 2016, 2017, 2018, 2019, 2020, 2021, 2022, 2023, 2024, 2025

== Current squad ==
As of 23 August 2023.

Note: Flags indicate national team as defined under FIFA eligibility rules; some limited exceptions apply. Players may hold more than one non-FIFA nationality.

No.	Pos.	Nation	Player
1	GK	JPN	Takuya Sugimoto
2	DF	JPN	Takumi Onda
3	DF	JPN	Kazuki Nakayama
4	DF	JPN	Yuan Shimazu
5	DF	JPN	Goru Shima
6	MF	JPN	Mutsuki Hirooka
7	FW	JPN	Hideki Morinaga
8	MF	JPN	Tatsuya Wada
9	FW	JPN	Hiyu Kazawa
10	MF	JPN	Kohei Kitagawa
11	FW	JPN	Kenji Kitawaki
13	FW	JPN	Yuga Fukumoto
14	MF	JPN	Shohei Okuno
15	FW	JPN	Kaoru Nonaka
16	DF	JPN	Ryota Ikeniwa

No.	Pos.	Nation	Player
17	MF	JPN	Seiji Tarutani
18	DF	JPN	Eiichiro Ozaki
19	MF	JPN	Mahiro Ano (on loan from Tokyo Verdy)
20	MF	JPN	Ibuki Nakajima
21	GK	JPN	Shoa Onishi
22	DF	JPN	Hibiki Enomoto
23	DF	JPN	Ryosei Ito
24	MF	JPN	Masato Yasukawa
26	DF	JPN	Hiroto Yagi (on loan from Fukushima United)
27	FW	JPN	Yuki Oshitani
28	DF	JPN	Hayate Matsumoto
29	FW	JPN	Tsugutoshi Oishi
31	GK	JPN	Shun Anzai (on loan from Fukushima United)
33	MF	JPN	Yuta Takahashi
39	FW	JPN	Kenshiro Kanemura
