= Gonera =

Gonera is a surname. Notable people with the surname include:

- Andrzej Gonera (born 1939), Polish gymnast
- Robert Gonera (born 1969), Polish actor

== See also ==
- Bonera
