= Kohei Takahashi =

Japanese footballer

Personal information
- Full name: Kohei Takahashi
- Date of birth: 20 September 1999 (age 27)
- Place of birth: Hokkaido, Japan
- Height: 1.72 m (5 ft 8 in)
- Position: Midfielder

Team information
- Current team: Vanraure Hachinohe
- Number: 26

Youth career
- Date Higashi SSS
- –2011: FC Date SSS
- 2012–2014: Date Junior High School
- 2015–2017: Muroran Otani High School

College career
Years	Team	Apps	(Gls)
2018–2022	Sapporo University		

Senior career*
Years	Team	Apps	(Gls)
2021–2024	Nagano Parceiro	33	(2)
2025–	Vanraure Hachinohe	11	(0)
- * Club domestic league appearances and goals as of 13 August 2026

Kohei Takahashi (高橋 耕平, Takahashi Kohei; born 20 September 1999) is a Japanese footballer currently playing as a midfielder for Vanraure Hachinohe.

== Early life ==
Kohei was born in Hokkaido. He went to Muroran Ohtani High School and studied at Sapporo University.

== Career ==
Kohei joined Nagano as a designated special player. He made his debut for Nagano on the 17th October 2021, against Fujieda MYFC.

Kohei scored his first goal for Nagano against Azul Claro Numazu, scoring in the 90th+3rd minute.

== Career statistics ==
=== Club ===
As of 19 October 2021.

Club	Season	League			National Cup		League Cup		Other		Total	
Club	Season	Division	Apps	Goals	Apps	Goals	Apps	Goals	Apps	Goals	Apps	Goals
Sapporo University	2020	–			1 (Note: Appearances in the Emperor's Cup)	0	–		0	0	1	0
Nagano Parceiro	2021	J3 League	1	0	0	0	–		0	0	1	0
Career total			1	0	1	0	0	0	0	0	2	0
