= Rei Yonezawa =

Japanese footballer

Rei Yonezawa 米澤 令衣
Personal information
- Full name: Rei Yonezawa
- Date of birth: July 20, 1996 (age 30)
- Place of birth: Sakai, Osaka, Japan
- Height: 1.75 m (5 ft 9 in)
- Position: Forward

Team information
- Current team: Kamatamare Sanuki
- Number: 99

Youth career
- –2008: Shiromiki FC
- 2009–2011: Rip Ace SC
- 2012–2014: Vissel Kobe

Senior career*
Years	Team	Apps	(Gls)
2015–2018	Cerezo Osaka	0	(0)
2015	→ J. League U-22 (loan)	0	(0)
2015	→ Blaublitz Akita (loan)	23	(5)
2016–2018	→ Cerezo Osaka U-23 (loan)	65	(25)
2017	→ Renofa Yamaguchi FC (loan)	16	(0)
2019–2026	Kagoshima United FC	153	(43)
2026–	Kamatamare Sanuki	2	(0)
Medal record
Cerezo Osaka
Winner	J.League Cup	2017
Winner	Emperor's Cup	2017
- * Club domestic league appearances and goals as of 17 August 2026

Rei Yonezawa (米澤 令衣, Yonezawa, Rei; born July 20, 1996) is a Japanese football player, who plays for Kamatamare Sanuki.

== Career ==
After his outstanding performance with Vissel Kobe in Japan's main youth tournaments, Yonezawa signed a pro contract with Cerezo Osaka. He was loaned to J3 Blaublitz Akita until the end of 2015. In 2019, he signed to Kagoshima United.

== Club statistics ==
As of 20 November 2022.

Club performance			League		Cup		Total	
Season	Club	League	Apps	Goals	Apps	Goals	Apps	Goals
Japan			League		Emperor's Cup		Total	
2015	Cerezo Osaka	J2 League	0	0	–		0	0
2015	Blaublitz Akita	J3 League	23	5	1	0	24	5
2016	Cerezo Osaka U-23	J3 League	25	8	–		25	8
2017	Renofa Yamaguchi	J2 League	16	0	1	0	17	0
2017	Cerezo Osaka U-23	J3 League	12	5	–		12	5
2018	Cerezo Osaka U-23	J3 League	28	12	–		28	12
2019	Kagoshima United	J2 League	8	1	1	0	9	1
2020	Kagoshima United	J3 League	27	9	0	0	27	9
2021	Kagoshima United	J3 League	27	9	2	1	29	10
2022	Kagoshima United	J3 League	26	12	1	1	27	13
2023	Kagoshima United	J3 League	0	0	0	0	0	0
Total			192	61	6	2	198	63
