= Hiroki Kotani (footballer) =

Japanese footballer

Hiroki Kotani 小谷 光毅
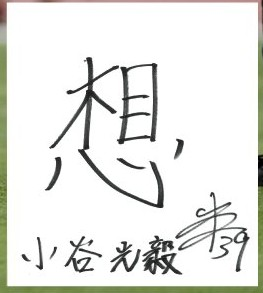
- Autograph in 2018

Personal information
- Full name: Hiroki Kotani
- Date of birth: April 25, 1993 (age 33)
- Place of birth: Sakai, Japan
- Height: 1.70 m (5 ft 7 in)
- Position: Midfielder

Team information
- Current team: Grulla Morioka
- Number: 39

Youth career
- Gamba Osaka
- 2013–2016: Meiji University

Senior career*
Years	Team	Apps	(Gls)
2017	BCF Wolfratshausen	11	(1)
2017–2018	VfR Garching	6	(1)
2018	Grulla Morioka	22	(3)
2019	Blaublitz Akita	16	(1)
2020–	Iwate Grulla Morioka		
- * Club domestic league appearances and goals as of 2 January 2020

Hiroki Kotani (小谷 光毅, Kotani Hiroki; born April 25, 1993) is a Japanese football player.

== Playing career ==
Kotani was born in Osaka Prefecture on April 25, 1993. After graduating from Meiji University, he joined the J3 League club Grulla Morioka in 2018. He switched to Blaublitz Akita, only to come back to Iwate Prefecture in 2020.

== Club statistics ==
Updated to 2 January 2020.

Club performance			League		Cup		Total	
Season	Club	League	Apps	Goals	Apps	Goals	Apps	Goals
Japan			League		Emperor's Cup		Total	
2018	Grulla Morioka	J3 League	22	3	1	0	23	3
2019	Blaublitz Akita	J3 League	16	1	0	0	16	1
Career total			38	4	1	0	39	4
