= Takayuki Morimoto =

Japanese footballer (born 1988)

Takayuki Morimoto 森本 貴幸
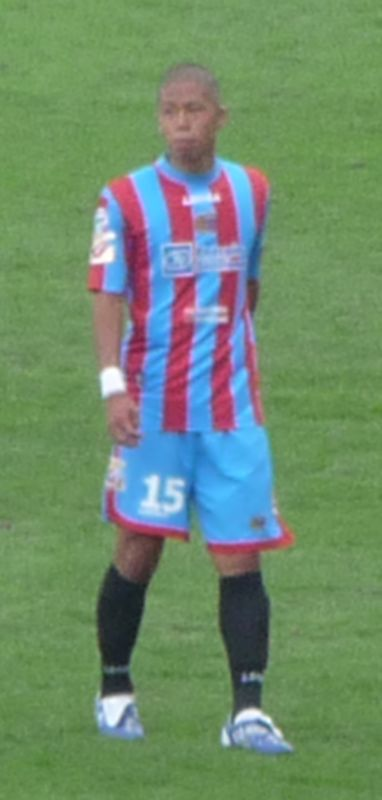
- Morimoto in 2009

Personal information
- Full name: Takayuki Morimoto
- Date of birth: 7 May 1988 (age 38)
- Place of birth: Kawasaki, Kanagawa, Japan
- Height: 1.80 m (5 ft 11 in)
- Position: Second striker

Youth career
- 1995–1997: Tsudayama FC
- 1998–2004: Tokyo Verdy

Senior career*
Years	Team	Apps	(Gls)
2004–2006	Tokyo Verdy	46	(5)
2006–2011	Catania	81	(15)
2011–2012	Novara	18	(4)
2012	Catania	5	(0)
2013	→ Al-Nasr Dubai (loan)	13	(6)
2013–2015	JEF United Chiba	73	(17)
2016–2017	Kawasaki Frontale	22	(5)
2018–2020	Avispa Fukuoka	26	(1)
2020	AEP Kozani	0	(0)
2021	Sportivo Luqueño	1	(0)
2022–2023	Taichung Futuro	15	(1)
Total		300	(54)

International career
2004–2005	Japan U-20	8	(2)
2008	Japan U-23	10	(1)
2009–2012	Japan	10	(3)
Medal record
Tokyo Verdy
Winner	Emperor's Cup	2004
Kawasaki Frontale
Winner	J1 League	2017
Runner-up	J.League Cup	2017
Runner-up	Emperor's Cup	2016
Representing Japan
AFC U-19 Championship
Bronze medal – third place	2004 Malaysia
- * Club domestic league appearances and goals

Takayuki Morimoto (森本 貴幸, Morimoto Takayuki; born 7 May 1988) is a Japanese former professional footballer who plays as a second striker. He holds the record for the youngest Japanese player to make his professional debut, and the youngest scorer in J1 League history. Morimoto represented Japan at the 2004 and 2008 versions of the Toulon Tournament, the 2004 AFC Youth Championship, the 2005 FIFA World Youth Championship, the 2008 Summer Olympics and the 2010 FIFA World Cup.

== Club career ==
=== Youth career ===
Born in Kawasaki, Kanagawa, Morimoto began his youth career with Tsudayama FC in 1995. He joined Tokyo Verdy's, then known as Yomiuri SC's youth set-ups on 1998. He was eventually promoted to Verdy's first-team in May 2004, when he was a first grader at high school.

=== Tokyo Verdy ===
On 13 March 2004, Morimoto made his J1 League debut for Tokyo Verdy against Júbilo Iwata at the age of 15 years, 10 months and 6 days, a former league record for youngest player to debut (since passed by Maki Kitahara on 1 March 2025). He scored his first goal against JEF United Ichihara on 5 May of the same year, two days before his 16th birthday, another league record for youngest goal scorer. He captured the J.League Rookie of the Year Award for the 2004 season. During the 2004 season, Morimoto was teammates with former Cerro Porteño player Nozomi Hiroyama. In the 2005 season at Tokyo Verdy, Morimoto was teammates with Riki Kitawaki, who would play in Paraguay before Morimoto would do the same several years later. On 23 July 2006, Tokyo Verdy announced a one-year loan deal sending Morimoto to Catania of Serie A.

=== Catania ===
Morimoto made his Serie A debut on 28 January 2007 during an away game against Atalanta. He entered the game in the 83rd minute and scored the equalizing goal, his first, just five minutes later. On 13 March 2007, it was confirmed by Catania that Morimoto had ruptured the anterior cruciate ligament (ACL) in his left knee and would be out for at least six months, ruling him out for the remainder of the 2006–07 season. Despite the serious injury, Catania recognized his potential and completed a permanent transfer deal in June 2007.

On 14 December 2008, Morimoto signed a three-year contract extension with Catania until 30 June 2011.

Morimoto had a breakthrough season for Catania during the 2008–09 season, as he scored ten goals in 25 league and Coppa Italia games while also being credited with several assists. Brazilian and Milan star Alexandre Pato told Italian sports daily Corriere dello Sport that he believed Morimoto was the best young player in Serie A and compared him to Ronaldo.

Despite all the talent and all the potential, the striker has never really lived up to all the expectations following an improvement in each of his first three seasons in Sicily. During the 2009–10 season, Morimoto scored an additional five goals, adding a further two during the 2010–11 league campaign. His performances have often been overshadowed by the likes of Giuseppe Mascara, Maxi López, Jorge Martínez and Gionatha Spinesi, while the signing of Argentine international Gonzalo Bergessio also limited his chances to feature.

On 11 July 2011, Catania confirmed to have sold Morimoto to newly promoted Serie A club Novara in a co-ownership bid. Morimoto's season was hampered by injuries which limited the Japanese international to just 18 league appearances, producing four goals. At the end of the season, Novara was relegated to Serie B after placing 19th, and Morimoto officially returned to Catania on 21 June 2012.

On 7 January 2013, Morimoto was loaned to Al-Nasr Dubai, coached by former Catania manager Walter Zenga. The loan deal expired on 30 June 2013, and the player returned to Sicily.

=== Later years ===
On 14 August 2013, Morimoto signed for J2 League club JEF United Chiba for an undisclosed fee.

On 24 December 2015, Morimoto signed for Kawasaki Frontale on a two-year deal, with the contract starting on 1 February 2016.

In October 2020, Morimoto signed for the Greek Football League club AEP Kozani for an undisclosed fee. Having not been able to play because of the league being indefinitely suspended because of the COVID-19 pandemic he asked for his release, making him a free agent.

In January 2021, Primera División Paraguaya team Sportivo Luqueño confirmed through their president that Morimito was going to arrive to Paraguay to sign for the club. In February 2021, Morimoto signed with the club. He was presented by the club through Twitter. He joined former Paraguay national team players Edgar Benitez, Guillermo Beltran and Luis Cabral. On 17 April 2021, Morimoto debuted for Sportivo Luqueño against Nacional Asunción in a 1–0 away defeat, being substituted onto the field in the 81st for Guillermo Beltran. This was his only appearance for the club, as he was released soon after.

On 23 August 2023, Serie D club Akragas announced the signing of Morimoto. However, the formal acquisition of the player was blocked by a number of bureaucratic issues related to his status as a non-EU citizen, which turned out to be insurmountable and led to the club announcing in January 2024 that the signing could not be completed at last.

== International career ==
Morimoto represented Japan at the Japan U20 national team level at both the 2004 AFC Youth Championship and the 2005 World Youth Championship. In 2008, he was a member of the Japan U23 national team for the 2008 Summer Olympics, where the team was eliminated in the preliminary round, losing all three matches and only managing to score one goal.

On 10 October 2009, Morimoto made his debut for the senior national team against Scotland, coming on as a substitute for Ryoichi Maeda in a 2–0 win. On 14 October 2009, he made his first start and scored his first goal against Togo in a 5–0 win.

== Personal life ==
In March 2021, Morimoto was involved in a traffic collision in Paraguay after crashing his vehicle against a motorcycle.

== Career statistics ==
=== Club ===
As of end of 2018 season

Appearances and goals by club, season and competition
Club	Season	League		National cup (Note: Includes Emperor's Cup, Coppa Italia and UAE President's Cup.)		League cup (Note: Includes J.League Cup and AFC Champions League.)		Total	
Club	Season	Apps	Goals	Apps	Goals	Apps	Goals	Apps	Goals
Tokyo Verdy	2004	22	4	0	0	2	0	24	4
Tokyo Verdy	2005	18	1	1	0	2	2	21	3
Tokyo Verdy	2006	6	0	0	0	–		6	0
Tokyo Verdy	Total	46	5	1	0	4	2	51	7
Catania	2006–07	5	1	–		–		5	1
Catania	2007–08	14	1	3	1	–		17	2
Catania	2008–09	23	7	1	2	–		24	9
Catania	2009–10	27	5	4	1	–		31	6
Catania	2010–11	12	1	1	1	–		13	2
Catania	Total	81	15	9	5	–		90	20
Novara	2011–12	18	4	1	0	–		19	4
Catania	2012–13	5	0	3	0	–		8	0
Al-Nasr Dubai (loan)	2012–13	13	6	3	1	6	3	22	10
JEF United Chiba	2013	12	2	2	0	–		14	2
JEF United Chiba	2014	34	10	2	2	–		36	12
JEF United Chiba	2015	27	5	3	0	–		30	5
JEF United Chiba	Total	73	17	7	2	–		80	19
Kawasaki Frontale	2016	11	2	2	0	1	1	14	3
Kawasaki Frontale	2017	11	3	3	4	8	0	22	7
Kawasaki Frontale	Total	22	5	5	4	9	1	36	10
Avispa Fukuoka	2018	23	1	2	0	-		25	1
Avispa Fukuoka	2019	3	0	0	0	–		3	0
Avispa Fukuoka	Total	26	1	2	0	0	0	28	10
AEP Kozani	2020	0	0	0	0	–		0	0
Sportivo Luqueño	2021	1	0	0	0	–		1	0
Career total		285	53	31	12	19	6	335	71

=== International ===
Appearances and goals by national team and year
National team	Year	Apps	Goals
Japan U20	2004	4	2
Japan U20	2005	4	0
Total		8	2
Japan U23	2008	10	1
Total		10	1
Japan	2009	2	1
Japan	2010	7	2
Japan	2012	1	0
Total		10	3

Scores and results list Japan's goal tally first, score column indicates score after each Morimoto goal.

List of international goals scored by Takayuki Morimoto
No.	Date	Venue	Opponent	Score	Result	Competition
1	14 October 2009	Miyagi Stadium, Miyagi, Japan	Togo		5–0	Friendly
2	7 September 2010	Nagai Stadium, Osaka, Japan	Guatemala		2–1	Friendly
3	7 September 2010	Nagai Stadium, Osaka, Japan	Guatemala		2–1	Friendly

== Honours ==
Tokyo Verdy

- Emperor's Cup: 2004
- Japanese Super Cup: 2005

Kawasaki Frontale

- J1 League: 2017

Individual

- J.League Rookie of the Year: 2004
- Manchester United Premier Cup Most Valuable Player: 2003
