= Bonera =

Bonera is an Italian surname. Notable people with the surname include:

- Daniele Bonera (born 1981), Italian footballer and coach
- Franco Bonera (born 1945), Italian motorcycle racer

== See also ==
- Gonera
