= Yuta Togashi =

Japanese footballer

Yuta Togashi 富樫 佑太
Personal information
- Full name: Yuta Togashi
- Date of birth: December 18, 1995 (age 30)
- Place of birth: Tokyo, Japan
- Height: 1.73 m (5 ft 8 in)
- Position: Forward

Team information
- Current team: Nara Club
- Number: 9

Youth career
- 2011–2013: Kokugakuin Univ. Kugayama High School

Senior career*
Years	Team	Apps	(Gls)
2014–2015	Huracán Valencia CF		
2015–2018	FC Ryukyu	86	(22)
2019–2022	FC Gifu	60	(7)
2023-2025	Gainare Tottori	99	(22)
2026-	Nara Clubi	9	(1)
- * Club domestic league appearances and goals as of 25 August 2026

Yuta Togashi (富樫 佑太, Togashi Yūta; born December 18, 1995) is a Japanese football player. He plays for Nara Club.

== Club statistics ==
Updated to end of 2018 season.

Club performance			League		Cup		Total	
Season	Club	League	Apps	Goals	Apps	Goals	Apps	Goals
Japan			League		Emperor's Cup		Total	
2015	FC Ryukyu	J3 League	9	0	0	0	9	0
2016	FC Ryukyu	J3 League	18	4	2	0	20	4
2017	FC Ryukyu	J3 League	27	2	1	1	29	3
2018	FC Ryukyu	J3 League	32	16	1	0	33	16
Total			86	22	4	1	91	23
