= Yuta Takahashi =

Japanese footballer

Personal information
- Full name: Yuta Takahashi
- Date of birth: 20 January 1998 (age 28)
- Place of birth: Japan
- Height: 1.69 m (5 ft 7 in)
- Position: Attacking midfielder

Team information
- Current team: Fukui United FC
- Number: 33

Youth career
- 2014–2016: Seiwa Gakuen High School

College career
Years	Team	Apps	(Gls)
2016–2020	Matsumoto University		

Senior career*
Years	Team	Apps	(Gls)
2020	Kamakura International		
2020–21	Burreli	21	(4)
2021	Elbasani		
2021–22	Butrinti	13	(0)
2022–	Fukui United FC	2	(0)
- * Club domestic league appearances and goals as of 4 July 2023

Yuta Takahashi (高橋勇太, Takahashi Yūta; born 20 January 1998) is a Japanese footballer who plays as an attacking midfielder for the Japanese club Fukui United FC.

== Club career ==
=== Burreli ===
On 6 September 2020, Takahashi signed a two-year contract with Kategoria e Parë club Burreli and received squad number 15. On 1 November 2020, he made his debut with Burreli in the 2020–21 Albanian Cup first round against Kastrioti after being named in the starting line-up.

=== Butrinti ===
On 20 January 2022, Takahashi signed a contract with Kategoria e Dytë club Butrinti and received squad number 6.

=== Fukui United FC ===
On 18 August 2022, Takahashi was signed to Hokushinetsu Football League (Div.1) club Fukui United FC in a permanent transfer.

== Career statistics ==
=== Club ===
As of 4 July 2023

Club	Season	League			Cup		Other		Total	
Club	Season	Division	Apps	Goals	Apps	Goals	Apps	Goals	Apps	Goals
Burreli	2020–21	Kategoria e Parë	21	4	1	0	1 (Note: All appearance(s) in 2020–21 Kategoria e Parë promotion play-off)	0	23	4
Butrinti	2021–22	Kategoria e Dytë	13	0	0	0	0	0	13	0
Fukui United FC	2022	Hokushinetsu Football League (Div.1)	2	0	0	0	1 (Note: All appearance(s) in 2022 All Japan Senior Football Championship)	0	3	0
Fukui United FC	2023	Hokushinetsu Football League (Div.1)								
Career total			36	4	1	0	2	0	39	4
