= 2020 J3 League =

7th season of the Japanese J3 League

Meiji Yasuda J3 League
- Season: 2020
- Dates: 27 June – 20 December
- Champions: Blaublitz Akita (2nd title)
- Promoted: Blaublitz Akita; SC Sagamihara
- Relegated: none (for season 2020 only)
- Matches: 306
- Goals: 791 (2.58 per match)
- Top goalscorer: Kaito Taniguchi; Roasso Kumamoto (18 goals)
- Biggest home win: 5 – 0 Azul Claro Numazu v Cerezo Osaka U23
- Highest scoring: 6-4 Kagoshima United v Gamba Osaka U23; 5-5 Yokohama Sports & Culture Club v Gamba Osaka U23
- Longest winning run: 9 Blaublitz Akita; 27 June to 9 August 2020
- Longest unbeaten run: 28 Blaublitz Akita; 27 June to 18 November 2020
- Highest attendance: 6,297; Nagano v Grulla 0-2
- Lowest attendance: 0 (due to COVID-19)
- Total attendance: 348,875
- Average attendance: 1,140
- All statistics correct as of 20 December 2020.

The 2020 J3 League, referred to as the 2020 Meiji Yasuda J3 League (Japanese: 2020 明治安田生命J3リーグ, Hepburn: 2020 Meiji Yasuda Seimei J3 Rīgu) for sponsorship reasons, was the 7th season of J3 League under its current name.

Blaublitz Akita won the J3 title for the second time in their history. They were promoted to the 2021 J2 League alongside SC Sagamihara. Both teams won promotion for the J2 League for the first time.

== Overview ==
On 19 March, the J.League announced no relegation would take place for the 2020 season, with the J1 League expanding to 20 clubs for the 2021 season.

This is last season to with three U-23 teams from J1 in 2020 season. J3 League has been scheduled for a reduction to 15 clubs before the 2021 season.

== Postponement of the beginning of the season ==
Due to the COVID-19 pandemic-related concerns, the Japan Football Association (JFA) opted to postpone the beginning of the season, firstly established for 7 March.

On 25 February, all J.League matches until 15 March were postponed in response to the COVID-19 pandemic. After that, it was announced that it would be postponed until 29 March. On March 19, the J.League announced no relegation would take place for the 2020 season, with the J1 League expanding to 20 clubs for the 2021 season. On 25 March, the league announced that the season would be suspended between 3 April and 6 May.

On 3 April, it was decided to start over with the official game schedule, which aimed to gradually resume J3 from 25 April, J2 from 2 May, and J1 from 9 May. Note that, considering a new schedule in the future, the schedule would have called for the season's resumption at least one month later and later in the month.

On 29 May, J.League announced its decision to resume on 27 June. On 9 June, the schedules of the 2020 season were published. On 15 June, new dates were also published. The first 2 matches in each league (J3 1st-2nd section) were held without spectators. After 10 July, as a general rule, the maximum number of people were 5,000 (stadiums with lower capacity are those with less than 50% of the capacity of people watching; no away supporters allowed). After August, the maximum stadium capacity was 50%, and there would be "high alert spectator matches".

After that, at the 11th J.League extraordinary executive committee meeting on 20 July, it was announced that the "super strict alert audience game" was extended to 10 August in view of the spread of coronavirus infection.

== Changes from the previous season ==
Promoted from 2019 JFL	Promoted to 2020 J2 League	Withdrawn / Disbanded
FC Imabari	Giravanz Kitakyushu; Thespakusatsu Gunma	None

2019 season saw two teams promoted to J2 League: Giravanz Kitakyushu won the championship after being for three seasons in the third tier, while Thespakusatsu Gunma won promotion just in the last game of the season. From second division, there was a double automatic relegation for the second time: FC Gifu played their first season in J3 after being in the second division for the last 12 years, when J3 League wasn't even on the cards. Alongside them, an incredible final day of the 2019 season pushed Kagoshima United FC immediately back to J3, just one year after sealing their first-ever participation to the second tier. This is the last J3 League season that featured the U-23 teams from J1 League. On 5 June, FC Tokyo U-23 withdrew from the league.

Also, Japan Football League saw the promotion of another club: after two fifth-placed performances, FC Imabari came third in 2019 and booked their first professional season in their history.

== Participating clubs ==
Locations of the 2020 J3 League teams

Club name	Home town	Stadium	Capacity	Last season	Licence
Azul Claro Numazu	Numazu	Ashitaka Stadium	10,000	J3（12th）	J3
Blaublitz Akita	Akita	Soyu Stadium	20,125	J3（8th）	J2
FC Gifu	All cities/towns in Gifu (Note: centering on Gifu)	Gifu Nagaragawa Stadium	26,109	Relegated from J2 (22nd)	J1
FC Imabari	Imabari	Arigato Service Dream Stadium	5,000	Promoted from JFL（3rd）	J2
Fukushima United FC	Fukushima	Toho Stadium	21,000	J3（11th）	J3
Gainare Tottori	All cities/towns in Tottori (Note: centering on Tottori, Yonago, Kurayoshi, Sakaiminato)	Axis Bird Stadium	16,033	J3（7th）	J2
Iwate Grulla Morioka	All cities/towns in Iwate	Iwagin Stadium	4,946	J3（18th）	J3
Kamatamare Sanuki	All cities/towns in Kagawa (Note: centering on Takamatsu, Marugame)	Pikara Stadium	30,099	J3（14th）	J2
Kagoshima United	Kagoshima	Shiranami Stadium	19,934	Relegated from J2 (21st)	J1
Kataller Toyama	All cities/towns in Toyama (Note: centering on Toyama)	Toyama Athletic Stadium	25,251	J3（4th）	J1
Fujieda MYFC	Cities/towns in Shizuoka Prefecture (Note: Fujieda, Shimada, Yaizu, Makinohara, Yoshida, Kawanehonmachi)	Fujieda Soccer Field	13,000	J3（3rd）	J3
Nagano Parceiro	Nagano	Nagano U Stadium	15,491	J3（9th）	J2
Roasso Kumamoto	Kumamoto, Kumamoto	Egao Kenko Stadium	32,000	J3（5th）	J1
SC Sagamihara	Sagamihara	Gion Stadium	15,300	J3（15th）	J2
Vanraure Hachinohe	Eastern cities/towns in Aomori (Note: Hachinohe, Towada, Gonohe, Sannohe, Takko, Hashikami, Nanbu, Shingo, Oirase, Misawa, Shichinohe, Rokunohe, Tohoku, Noheji, Yokohama, Rokkasho)	Prifoods Stadium	5,200	J3（10th）	J3
YSCC Yokohama	Yokohama	Nippatsu Mitsuzawa Stadium	15,454	J3（13th）	J3
Cerezo Osaka U-23	Osaka & Sakai, Osaka	Kincho Stadium	19,904	J3（6th）	-
Gamba Osaka U-23	North cities in Osaka	Panasonic Stadium Suita; Expo '70 Commemorative Stadium	39,694; 21,000	J3（17th）	-

=== Personnel and kits ===
Club	Manager	Captain	Kit manufacturer
Azul Claro Numazu	(Japan) Masataka Imai	(Japan) Masayuki Tokutake	(Germany) Puma
Blaublitz Akita	(Japan) Ken Yoshida	(Japan) Naoyuki Yamada	(Brazil) ATHLETA
FC Gifu	(Serbia) Zdravko Zemunović	(Japan) Tadashi Takeda	(United States) New Balance
FC Imabari	(Spain) Lluís Planagumà	(Japan) Keishi Kusumi	(Germany) Adidas
Fukushima United	(Japan) Takeo Matsuda	(Japan) Ryosuke Tamura	(Denmark) hummel
Gainare Tottori	(Japan) Riki Takagi	(Japan) Masataka Kani	(Germany) Puma
Iwate Grulla Morioka	(Japan) Yutaka Akita	(Japan) Shun Morishita	(United States) Under Armour
Kagoshima United FC	(North Korea) Kim Jong-song	(Japan) Noriyuki Sakemoto	(Germany) Puma
Kamatamare Sanuki	(Japan) Kazuhito Mochizuki	(Japan) Akira Takeuchi	(Brazil) ATHLETA
Kataller Toyama	(Japan) Ryo Adachi	(Japan) Junya Imase	(Japan) GOLDWin
Fujieda MYFC	(Japan) Nobuhiro Ishizaki	(Japan) Takuya Sugimoto	(Japan) gol.
Nagano Parceiro	(Japan) Yuji Yokoyama	(Japan) Nobuyuki Abe	(Brazil) Penalty
Roasso Kumamoto	(Japan) Takeshi Oki	(Japan) Tomotaka Okamoto	(Germany) Puma
SC Sagamihara	(Japan) Fumitake Miura	(Japan) Seitaro Tomisawa	(Japan) gol.
Vanraure Hachinohe	(Japan) Masafumi Nakaguchi	(Japan) Teppei Chikaishi	(Brazil) ATHLETA
YSCC Yokohama	(Japan) / (Germany) Yuki Stalph	(Japan) Koichi Miyao	(Japan) younger
Cerezo Osaka U-23	(Japan) Kazuhiro Murata	none	(Germany) Puma
Gamba Osaka U-23	(Japan) Hitoshi Morishita	none	(England) Umbro

=== Managerial changes ===
Team	Outgoing manager	Manner of departure	Date of vacancy	Incoming manager	Date of appointment
Cerezo Osaka U-23	(Japan) Kazuhiro Murata	Appointed Academy Deputy Director and U-18 Head Coach	28 July 2020	(Japan) Yoshiaki Maruyama	28 July 2020
FC Gifu	(Serbia) Zdravko Zemunović	Change of director	25 September 2020	(Japan) Kenji Nakada	25 September 2020

== League table ==
It was decided on 19 March to change the format regarding the rules for promotion/relegation for the end of the season for the J1, J2 and J3 leagues, such that there would be no relegation this season, that two clubs from the J2 League would be promoted to the 2021 J1 League, and that two clubs from the J3 League would be promoted to the 2021 J2 League (subject to licensing regulations).

FC Tokyo U-23's withdrawal was approved at a board meeting held on 5 June, leaving the J3 League with 18 teams.

Pos	Team	Pld	W	D	L	GF	GA	GD	Pts	Promotion
1	Blaublitz Akita (C, P)	34	21	10	3	55	18	+37	73	Promotion to 2021 J2 League; 2020 Emperor's Cup quarter-finals
2	SC Sagamihara (P)	34	16	13	5	43	35	+8	61	Promotion to 2021 J2 League (Note: Only teams that hold a J2 licence are eligible for promotion.)
3	Nagano Parceiro	34	17	8	9	45	26	+19	59	
4	Kagoshima United	34	18	4	12	55	43	+12	58	
5	Gainare Tottori	34	17	6	11	47	37	+10	57	
6	FC Gifu	34	16	8	10	50	39	+11	56	
7	FC Imabari	34	15	10	9	39	27	+12	55	
8	Roasso Kumamoto	34	16	6	12	56	47	+9	54	
9	Kataller Toyama	34	15	5	14	52	43	+9	50	
10	Fujieda MYFC	34	14	7	13	48	44	+4	49	
11	Iwate Grulla Morioka	34	11	9	14	36	47	−11	42	
12	Azul Claro Numazu	34	12	5	17	36	40	−4	41	
13	Fukushima United	34	11	6	17	46	55	−9	39	
14	Gamba Osaka U-23	34	9	8	17	43	55	−12	35	Folded
15	Vanraure Hachinohe	34	8	9	17	42	56	−14	33	
16	Kamatamare Sanuki	34	7	10	17	33	52	−19	31	
17	YSCC Yokohama	34	5	12	17	37	66	−29	27	
18	Cerezo Osaka U-23	34	5	10	19	28	61	−33	25	Folded
19	FC Tokyo U-23	0	0	0	0	0	0	0	0	Withdrew due to the COVID-19 pandemic in Japan

Updated to match(es) played on 20 December 2020. Source: 2020 MEIJI YASUDA J3 LEAGUE League table
Rules for classification: 1) Points; 2) Goal difference; 3) Head-to-head points; 4) Head-to-head goal difference; 5) Head-to-head goal scored; 6) Number of wins; 7) Goals scored; 8) Fair-play points
(C) Champions; (P) Promoted

== Top scorers ==
After matches played on 20 December 2020.

Rank	Player	Club	Goals
1	(Japan) Kaito Taniguchi	Roasso Kumamoto	18
2	(Japan) Tsugutoshi Oishi	Fujieda MYFC	14
2	(Japan) Takuya Miyamoto	YSCC Yokohama	14
4	(Nigeria) Ismaila	Fukushima United FC	13
4	(Brazil) Rômulo	SC Sagamihara	13
6	(Japan) Tsubasa Yoshihira	Fujieda MYFC	11
6	(Japan) Hayato Asakawa	Roasso Kumamoto	11
8	(Japan) Ryota Nakamura	Blaublitz Akita	10
8	(Japan) Shoji Toyama	Gamba Osaka U-23	10
8	(Japan) Hayate Take	Kataller Toyama	10
8	(Japan) Shota Kawanishi	FC Gifu	10
8	(Japan) Naoki Sanda	Nagano Parceiro	10
8	(Japan) Yosuke Kamigata	Vanraure Hachinohe	10

== Attendances ==
Pos	Team	Total	High	Low	Average	Change
1	FC Gifu	44,942	5,222	0	2,644	−60.2%^{†}
2	Nagano Parceiro	41,629	6,297	0	2,449	−18.4%
3	Kagoshima United FC	37,635	3,990	0	2,214	−61.7%^{†}
4	Roasso Kumamoto	29,111	3,435	0	1,712	−69.1%
7	Kataller Toyama	20,681	2,592	0	1,217	−55.5%
5	FC Imabari	23,042	2,139	0	1,355	−56.3%^{‡}
6	Blaublitz Akita	20,761	2,226	0	1,221	−22.5%
10	Kamatamare Sanuki	14,767	1,506	0	869	−58.9%
11	Gainare Tottori	13,731	1,451	0	808	−63.8%
13	Vanraure Hachinohe	11,316	1,066	0	666	−62.2%
8	Azul Claro Numazu	15,720	1,890	0	925	−62.6%
12	Fujieda MYFC	11,617	1,271	0	683	−60.7%
9	SC Sagamihara	15,609	2,664	0	918	−68.1%
14	YSCC Yokohama	10,597	1,109	0	623	−43.1%
16	Fukushima United	9,902	1,369	0	582	−53.1%
15	Gamba Osaka U-23	10,120	2,526	0	595	−52.9%
17	Cerezo Osaka U-23	9,511	1,672	0	559	−53.3%
18	Iwate Grulla Morioka	8,184	1,024	0	481	−64.8%
	League total	348,875	6,297	0	1,140	−52.4%

Updated to games played on 20 December 2020
Source: J. League Data
Notes:
^{†} Last year in J2 League
^{‡} Last year in Japan Football League.

== See also ==
- Japan Football Association (JFA)
- J.League
- 2020 J1 League (I)
- 2020 J2 League (II)
- 2020 J3 League (III)
- 2020 Japan Football League (IV)
- 2020 Japanese Regional Leagues (V/VI)
- 2020 Fuji Xerox Super Cup (Super Cup)
- 2020 Emperor's Cup (National Cup)
- 2020 J.League YBC Levain Cup (League Cup)
