= Tsugutoshi Oishi =

Japanese footballer

Tsugutoshi Oishi 大石 治寿
Personal information
- Full name: Tsugutoshi Oishi
- Date of birth: 25 September 1989 (age 37)
- Place of birth: Yokohama, Kanagawa, Japan
- Height: 1.77 m (5 ft 9 1/2 in)
- Position: Forward

Team information
- Current team: Fukui United

Youth career
- 2005–2007: Shizuoka Gakuen High School

College career
Years	Team	Apps	(Gls)
2008–2009	Kanagawa University		

Senior career*
Years	Team	Apps	(Gls)
2009–2013	FC Kariya	62	(46)
2014–2015	Fujieda MYFC	59	(31)
2016	Tochigi SC	30	(11)
2017–2018	Renofa Yamaguchi	30	(3)
2019	SC Sagamihara	30	(11)
2020–2022	Fujieda MYFC	65	(20)
2023–	Fukui United	0	(0)
- * Club domestic league appearances and goals as of 18 January 2023, 2:34 (UTC)

Tsugutoshi Oishi (大石 治寿, Ōishi Tsugutoshi; born September 25, 1989) is a Japanese footballer who plays as a forward. He currently plays for Fukui United.

== Club career ==
He played four seasons for FC Kariya, and two seasons with Fujieda MYFC. In 2016, Oishi joined Tochigi SC. After Tochigi SC missed out on a J2 promotion, Oishi decided to leave the club to join the J2-based team Renofa Yamaguchi in 2017.

For the 2020 season, he returned to Fujieda MYFC, five years after his departure. He helped the club to earn promotion to J2, the first time Fujieda had done so. However, he decided to not renew his contract at the club, and left Fujieda at the end of the season.

On 18 January 2023, it was announced that Oishi had signed with HFL club Fukui United.

== Career statistics ==
=== Club ===
As of the start from 2023 season.

Club performance			League		Cup		Total	
Season	Club	League	Apps	Goals	Apps	Goals	Apps	Goals
Japan			League		Emperor's Cup		Total	
2009	FC Kariya	JFL	12	1	1	0	13	1
2010	FC Kariya	JRL (Tokai, Div. 1)	16	17	-		16	17
2011	FC Kariya	JRL (Tokai, Div. 1)	14	9	-		14	9
2012	FC Kariya	JRL (Tokai, Div. 1)	8	6	0	0	8	6
2013	FC Kariya	JRL (Tokai, Div. 1)	12	13	-		12	13
2014	Fujieda MYFC	J3 League	29	17	2	3	31	20
2015	Fujieda MYFC	J3 League	30	14	0	0	30	14
2016	Tochigi SC	J3 League	30	11	0	0	30	11
2017	Renofa Yamaguchi	J2 League	23	3	1	1	24	4
2018	Renofa Yamaguchi	J2 League	7	0	0	0	7	0
2019	SC Sagamihara	J3 League	30	11	0	0	30	11
2020	Fujieda MYFC	J3 League	33	14	0	0	33	14
2021	Fujieda MYFC	J3 League	27	6	0	0	27	6
2022	Fujieda MYFC	J3 League	5	0	0	0	5	0
2023	Fukui United	Hokushinetsu Football League	0	0	0	0	0	0
Total			276	122	4	4	280	126
