= Koichi Miyao =

Japanese footballer

Koichi Miyao 宮尾 孝一
Personal information
- Full name: Koichi Miyao
- Date of birth: June 15, 1993 (age 33)
- Place of birth: Kanagawa, Japan
- Height: 1.81 m (5 ft 11 1/2 in)
- Position: Midfielder

Team information
- Current team: YSCC Yokohama
- Number: 7

Youth career
- 2009–2011: Teikyo High School

College career
Years	Team	Apps	(Gls)
2012–2015	Toin University of Yokohama		

Senior career*
Years	Team	Apps	(Gls)
2016–	YSCC Yokohama	67	(3)
- * Club domestic league appearances and goals as of 20 February 2020

Koichi Miyao (宮尾 孝一, Miyao Kōichi; born June 15, 1993) is a Japanese football player. He plays for YSCC Yokohama.

== Club statistics ==
Updated to 20 February 2020.

Club performance			League		Cup		Total	
Season	Club	League	Apps	Goals	Apps	Goals	Apps	Goals
Japan			League		Emperor's Cup		Total	
2016	YSCC Yokohama	J3 League	19	0	–		19	0
2017	YSCC Yokohama	J3 League	17	1	1	1	18	2
2018	YSCC Yokohama	J3 League	0	0	0	0	0	0
2019	YSCC Yokohama	J3 League	31	2	0	0	31	2
Total			67	3	1	1	68	4
