= Vanraure Hachinohe =

Japanese football club

Vanraure Hachinohe ヴァンラーレ八戸
- Full name: Vanraure Hachinohe FC
- Founded: 2006; 20 years ago
- Ground: Prifoods Stadium; Hachinohe, Aomori
- Capacity: 5,200
- Chairman: Kentaro Hosogoe
- Manager: Keiji Kuraishi
- League: J2 League
- 2025: J3 League, 2nd of 20 (promoted)
- Website: vanraure.net
Home colours	Away colours

Vanraure Hachinohe (ヴァンラーレ八戸, Vuanrāre Hachinohe) is a professional football club based in Hachinohe, a city in the southeastern part of Aomori Prefecture in Japan. They are set to play in the J2 League from 2026–27, the Japanese second tier of professional football after promotion from the J3 League in 2025.

== Name origin ==
The name Vanraure comes from the combination of two Italian words: derivante, meaning "origin"; and australe, meaning "southern". It thus refers to the origin of the club in the southern area of Hachinohe, in the former village of Nangō.

== History ==
The club was founded in 2006 as a merger of two football clubs: Hachinohe Industry SC (八戸工業サッカークラブ) and Nango FC (南郷FC), joining Tōhoku League Division 2 North. Since 2008 the club's aim was to become a professional club and join J.League. In 2011, because of Tōhoku earthquake and tsunami, the two blocks of Tōhoku Division 2 were temporarily merged into a single group with no promotion, and Vanraure won the merged Division 2 title for the first time. In 2012 they returned to Division 2 North and were only able to finish in second place behind Ganju Iwate, but won the promotion playoff against Cobaltore Onagawa, who were also promoted because Fukushima United gained promotion to JFL.

With the introduction of J3 League for 2014, the club applied for J. League Associate Membership in June 2013 and were approved in September 2013. The J3 license was postponed until the next evaluation in 2014 due to their stadium not meeting league requirements.

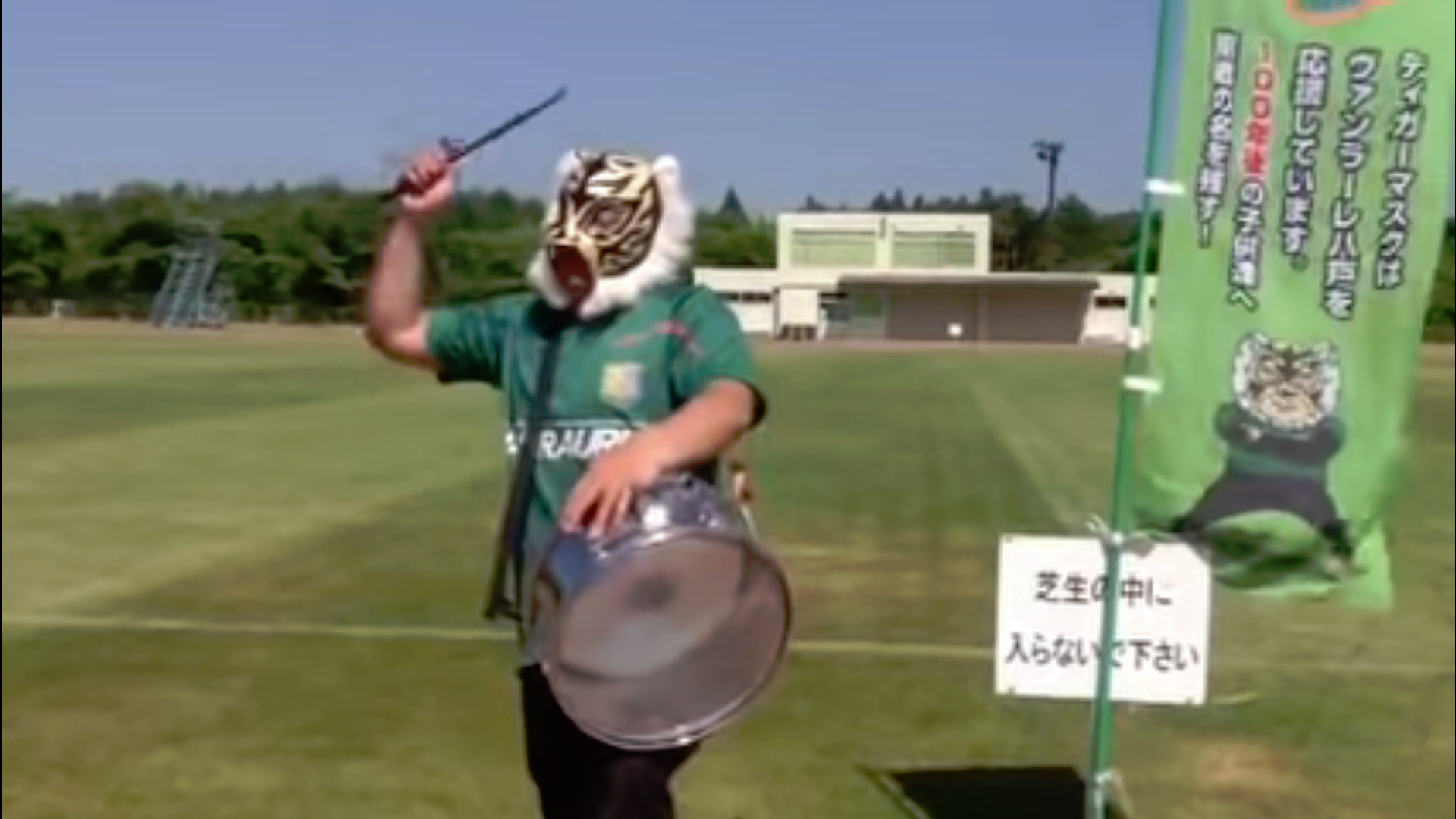
Tiga mask, a head of a cheering group

Because of vacancies left by some clubs that made up the J3 League, JFL selected other clubs besides the 2013 Regional League promotion series winners who had submitted an application. Vanraure was one of four clubs by application to be promoted and competed in JFL for the first time in 2014. In July 2015, Vanraure won the Apertura Championship but lost to Clausura champion Sony Sendai FC on penalties in the two-leg championship stage after a tie on aggregate.

After several attempts, Vanraure finally were promoted to J3 League in 2018; they achieved 3rd place behind Honda FC and FC Osaka, which allowed them to earn a professional spot for 2019.

Vanraure Hachinohe acquired a J2 license on 2021, which allows promotion to the J2 once the club finishes the season in a qualifying position.

On 29 November 2025, Vanraure Hachinohe secure promotion to J2 League for the first time in their history from next season after draw against FC Ryukyu 1–1 in final matchweek.

== League and cup record ==
Champions	Runners-up	Third place	Promoted	Relegated

League														J. League Cup	Emperor's Cup	Shakaijin Cup
Season	Division	Tier	Teams	Pos.	P	W	D	L	F	A	GD	Pts	Attendance/G	J. League Cup	Emperor's Cup	Shakaijin Cup
2006	Tōhoku League (Div. 2 North)	5	8	5th	14	6	1	7	37	38	−1	19		Not eligible	Did not qualify	Did not qualify
2007	Tōhoku League (Div. 2 North)	5	8	6th	14	4	5	5	22	25	−3	17		Not eligible	Did not qualify	Did not qualify
2008	Tōhoku League (Div. 2 North)	5	8	4th	14	7	2	5	31	26	5	23		Not eligible	Did not qualify	Did not qualify
2009	Tōhoku League (Div. 2 North)	5	8	3rd	14	8	2	4	43	25	18	26		Not eligible	Did not qualify	Did not qualify
2010	Tōhoku League (Div. 2 North)	5	8	2nd	14	12	0	2	52	10	42	36		Not eligible	1st round	Did not qualify
2011	Tōhoku League (Div. 2)	5	6	1st	10	10	0	0	61	1	60	30		Not eligible	Did not qualify	Did not qualify
2012	Tōhoku League (Div. 2 North)	5	8	2nd	14	12	1	1	74	8	66	37		Not eligible	1st round	1st round
2013	Tōhoku League (Div. 1)	4	10	2nd	18	16	1	1	67	8	59	49		Not eligible	2nd round	2nd round
2014	JFL	4	14	9th	26	8	6	12	30	32	−2	30	763	Not eligible	2nd round	Not eligible
2015	JFL	4	16	2nd	30	17	8	5	36	21	15	59	974	Not eligible	1st round	Not eligible
2016	JFL	4	16	7th	30	13	7	10	34	27	7	46	1,754	Not eligible	1st round	Not eligible
2017	JFL	4	16	5th	30	15	6	9	41	31	10	51	2,106	Not eligible	3rd round	Not eligible
2018	JFL	4	16	3rd	30	16	8	6	43	21	22	56	2,208	Not eligible	Did not qualify	Not eligible
2019	J3	3	18	10th	34	14	6	14	49	42	7	49	1,760	Not eligible	3rd round	Not eligible
2020 †	J3	3	18	15th	34	8	9	17	42	56	−14	33	666	Not eligible	Did not qualify	Not eligible
2021 †	J3	3	15	13th	28	7	8	13	24	44	−20	29	1,137	Not eligible	3rd round	Not eligible
2022	J3	3	18	10th	34	14	1	19	32	46	−14	43	1,503	Not eligible	1st round	Not eligible
2023	J3	3	20	7th	38	15	11	12	49	47	2	56	1,890	Not eligible	1st round	Not eligible
2024	J3	3	20	11th	38	13	13	12	44	42	2	52	1,728	2nd round	2nd round	Not eligible
2025	J3	3	20	2nd	38	21	9	8	46	23	23	72	2,374	1st round	Did not qualify	Not eligible
2026	J2	2	40	36th	18	4	6	8	15	19	–4	20	2,383	N/A		Not eligible
2026–27	J2	2	20	TBD	38									TBD	TBD	Not eligible

Key

- Pos. = Position in league; P = Games played; W = Games won; D = Games drawn; L = Games lost; F = Goals scored; A = Goals conceded; GD = Goals difference; Pts = Points gained
- Attendance/G = Average home league attendance
- † 2020 & 2021 seasons attendances reduced by COVID-19 worldwide pandemic
- Note: The 2011 season changed temporarily due to the Tōhoku earthquake and tsunami, clubs in the affected area could not play, therefore the Division 2 North & Division 2 South merged into one group and the clubs only played once each. No promotion to Division 1 in that season.
- Source: J.League Data Site

== Honours ==
Vanraure Hachinohe Honours
Honour	No.	Years
Aomori Prefectural Football Championship Emperor's Cup Aomori Prefectural Qualifiers	11	2010, 2012, 2013, 2014, 2016, 2017, 2019, 2021, 2022, 2023, 2024
Tōhoku League Division 2	1	2011
Japan Football League Apertura Champions	1	2015

== Current squad ==
As of 6 November 2026.

Note: Flags indicate national team as defined under FIFA eligibility rules; some limited exceptions apply. Players may hold more than one non-FIFA nationality.

No.	Pos.	Nation	Player
1	GK	JPN	Koichi Yoshimura
2	DF	JPN	Wataru Hiramatsu
3	DF	JPN	Yudai Sawada
4	MF	JPN	Shinnosuke Suzuki
5	MF	JPN	Daisuke Inazumi
6	MF	JPN	Fumiya Unoki
7	MF	JPN	Aoi Sato
8	MF	JPN	Shoma Otoizumi
9	FW	JPN	Ryusei Takao
10	FW	JPN	Ryuji Sawakami
11	DF	JPN	Hiroto Yukie
13	GK	JPN	Shogo Onishi
14	DF	JPN	Haruki Shirai (on loan from V-Varen Nagasaki)
15	DF	JPN	Kirato Sasaki (on loan from Mito HollyHock)
17	MF	JPN	Yuta Sato

No.	Pos.	Nation	Player
24	MF	JPN	Riku Kurisawa
25	GK	JPN	Yusuke Taniguchi
26	MF	JPN	Kohei Takahashi
28	MF	JPN	Tsubasa Tanaka
29	FW	JPN	Kenta Oka
30	FW	JPN	Yuta Inami
33	MF	JPN	Yuma Igari (on loan from JEF United Chiba)
34	MF	JPN	Shoma Takayoshi
35	FW	JPN	William Owie
36	DF	JPN	Senri Hosaka ^{DSP}
77	GK	MYA	Kaung Zan Mara (on loan from Machida Zelvia)
80	MF	JPN	Kazuma Nagata
88	FW	JPN	Masaki Shintani
99	FW	JPN	Seiya Nakano

== Club officials ==
As of 6 November 2026.

Position	Name
Manager	(Japan) Keiji Kuraishi
Coach	(Japan) Shintaro Ihara
Coach	(Japan) Toshitake Tanaka
Goalkeeping coach	(Japan) Kazuyoshi Nishitani
Physical coach	(Japan) Takuya Narita
Chief trainer	(Japan) Hiroto Nakanowatari
Trainer	(Japan) Aoi Endo
Competent	(Japan) Taisei Soga

== Managerial history ==
Manager	Nationality	Tenure	
Manager	Nationality	Start	Finish
Matsuichi Yamada	Japan	1 February 2010	31 January 2015
Kazuhito Mochizuki	Japan	1 February 2015	31 January 2017
Tetsuji Hashiratani	Japan	1 February 2017	31 January 2018
Masahiro Kuzuno	Japan	1 February 2018	31 January 2019
Atsuto Ōishi	Japan	1 February 2019	31 January 2020
Masafumi Nakaguchi	Japan	1 February 2020	31 January 2021
Masahiro Kuzuno	Japan	1 February 2021	13 June 2022
Ryo Shigaki	Japan	14 June 2022	31 January 2023
Nobuhiro Ishizaki	Japan	1 February 2023	6 December 2025
Yuki Takahashi	Japan	12 December 2025	6 June 2026
Keiji Kuraishi	Japan	9 June 2026	Present

== Kit evolution ==
Home kit – 1st
2011–2014	2015–2016	2017	2018	2019
2020	2021	2022	2023	2024
2025	2026 -			

Away kit – 2nd
2011–2014	2015–2016	2017	2018	2019
2020	2021	2022	2023	2024
2025	2026 -			
