= Takuya Sugimoto =

Japanese footballer (born 1989)

Takuya Sugimoto 杉本拓也
Personal information
- Full name: Takuya Sugimoto
- Date of birth: 31 December 1989 (age 36)
- Place of birth: Shizuoka, Japan
- Height: 1.78 m (5 ft 10 in)
- Position: Goalkeeper

Team information
- Current team: Fukui United
- Number: 30

Youth career
- 2005–2007: Fujieda Meisei High School

College career
Years	Team	Apps	(Gls)
2008–2011	Nihon University		

Senior career*
Years	Team	Apps	(Gls)
2012–2017	Gainare Tottori	112	(0)
2018–2022	Fujieda MYFC	1	(0)
2023-	Fukui United	14	(0)
- * Club domestic league appearances and goals as of 29 October 2024

Takuya Sugimoto (杉本拓也, Sugimoto, Takuya; born 31 December 1989, in Shizuoka) is a Japanese footballer who plays for Fukui United.

== Club statistics ==
Updated to 23 February 2018.

Club performance			League		Cup		Total	
Season	Club	League	Apps	Goals	Apps	Goals	Apps	Goals
Japan			League		Emperor's Cup		Total	
2012	Gainare Tottori	J2 League	0	0	0	0	0	0
2013	Gainare Tottori	J2 League	22	0	0	0	22	0
2014	Gainare Tottori	J3 League	12	0	1	0	13	0
2015	Gainare Tottori	J3 League	36	0	2	0	38	0
2016	Gainare Tottori	J3 League	17	0	0	0	17	0
2017	Gainare Tottori	J3 League	25	0	1	0	26	0
Career total			112	0	4	0	116	0
