= 2019 J3 League =

6th season of the Japanese J3 League

Meiji Yasuda J3 League
- Season: 2019
- Dates: 9 March – 8 December 2019
- Champions: Giravanz Kitakyushu
- Promoted: Giravanz Kitakyushu; Thespakusatsu Gunma
- Matches: 306
- Goals: 813 (2.66 per match)
- Highest attendance: 16,027; Roasso Kumamoto – Gamba Osaka U-23 (7 September)
- Lowest attendance: 267; FC Tokyo U-23 – SC Sagamihara (20 October)
- Average attendance: 2,396

The 2019 J3 League, referred to as the 2019 Meiji Yasuda J3 League (Japanese: 2019 明治安田生命J3リーグ, Hepburn: 2019 Meiji Yasuda Seimei J3 Rīgu) for sponsorship reasons, was the sixth season of J3 League under its current name.

== Clubs ==
Locations of the 2019 J3 League teams

The 2018 season saw two teams promoted to J2 League: FC Ryukyu won the championship by nine points over second-placed Kagoshima United FC, who confirmed their promotion to the 2019 J2 League season with still one game remianing. From the second division, there was a double automatic relegation for the first time: Kamatamare Sanuki returned to the third tier after five seasons, but they were promoted in 2013 from Japan Football League, when J3 League was planned. The same goes for Roasso Kumamoto, who returned to the third level of Japanese football after more than a decade.

Also, Japan Football League saw the promotion of Vanraure Hachinohe, who came third in JFL and they booked their first professional season in club history.

| Club | Location | Venue | Capacity | Last season |
|---|---|---|---|---|
| Azul Claro Numazu | Numazu | Ashitaka Stadium | 10,000 | J3（4th） |
| Blaublitz Akita | Akita | Soyu Stadium | 20,125 | J3（8th） |
| Fukushima United FC | Fukushima | Toho Stadium | 21,000 | J3（12th） |
| Gainare Tottori | Tottori | Torigin Bird Stadium | 16,033 | J3（3rd） |
| Giravanz Kitakyushu | Kitakyushu | Mikuni World Stadium Kitakyushu | 15,066 | J3（17th） |
| Iwate Grulla Morioka | Morioka | Iwagin Stadium | 4,946 | J3（13th） |
| Kamatamare Sanuki | Takamatsu, Kagawa | Pikara Stadium | 30,099 | Relegated from J2 J2（22nd） |
| Kataller Toyama | Toyama | Toyama Athletic Stadium | 25,251 | J3（11th） |
| Fujieda MYFC | Fujieda | Fujieda Soccer Field | 13,000 | J3（16th） |
| Nagano Parceiro | Nagano | Nagano U Stadium | 15,491 | J3（10th） |
| Roasso Kumamoto | Kumamoto, Kumamoto | Egao Kenko Stadium | 32,000 | Relegated from J2 J2（21st） |
| SC Sagamihara | Sagamihara | Gion Stadium | 15,300 | J3（9th） |
| Thespakusatsu Gunma | All cities/towns in Gunma | Shoda Shoyu Stadium Gunma | 15,253 | J3（5th） |
| FC Tokyo U-23 | Tokyo | Ajinomoto Field Nishigaoka | 7,137 | J3（14th） |
| Vanraure Hachinohe | Eastern cities/towns in Aomori (Note: Hachinohe, Towada, Gonohe, Sannohe, Takko, Hashikami, Nanbu, Shingo, Oirase, Misawa, Shichinohe, Rokunohe, Tohoku, Noheji, Yokohama, Rokkasho) | Daihatsu Stadium | 5,200 | Promoted from JFL JFL（3rd） |
| YSCC Yokohama | Yokohama | Nippatsu Mitsuzawa Stadium | 15,454 | J3（15th） |
| Cerezo Osaka U-23 | Osaka & Sakai, Osaka | Kincho Stadium | 19,904 | J3（7th） |
| Gamba Osaka U-23 | North cities in Osaka | Panasonic Stadium Suita Expo '70 Commemorative Stadium | 39,694 21,000 | J3（6th） |

=== Personnel and kits ===
| Club | Manager | Captain | Kit manufacturer |
|---|---|---|---|
| Azul Claro Numazu | (Japan) Ken Yoshida | (Japan) Takuya Sugai | Puma |
| Blaublitz Akita | (Japan) Shuichi Mase | (Japan) Hiroki Kotani | ATHLETA |
| Cerezo Osaka U-23 | (Japan) Yuji Okuma | none | Puma |
| Fukushima United | (Japan) Takeo Matsuda | (Japan) Akihiro Sakata | hummel |
| Gainare Tottori | (Japan) Riki Takagi | (Brazil) Fernandinho | Puma |
| Gamba Osaka U-23 | (Japan) Hitoshi Morishita | none | Umbro |
| Giravanz Kitakyushu | (Japan) Shinji Kobayashi | (Japan) Yohei Naito | bonera |
| Grulla Morioka | (Japan) Toshimi Kikuchi | TBD | Under Armour |
| Kamatamare Sanuki | (Japan) Kenichi Uemura | (Japan) Akira Takeuchi | ATHLETA |
| Kataller Toyama | (Japan) Ryo Adachi | (Japan) Junya Imase | Goldwin |
| Fujieda MYFC | (Japan) Nobuhiro Ishizaki | (Japan) Takuya Sugimoto | gol. |
| Nagano Parceiro | (Japan) Yuji Yokoyama | (Japan) Takahiro Oshima | Penalty |
| Roasso Kumamoto | (Japan) Hiroki Shibuya | (Japan) Shoto Suzuki | Puma |
| SC Sagamihara | (Japan) Fumitake Miura | (Japan) Seitaro Tomisawa | gol. |
| Thespakusatsu Gunma | (Japan) Keiichiro Nuno | (Japan) Tetsuya Funatsu | Finta |
| FC Tokyo U-23 | (Japan) Tetsu Nagasawa | none | Umbro |
| Vanraure Hachinohe | (Japan) Atsuto Oishi | (Japan) Takafumi Sudo | ATHLETA |
| YSCC Yokohama | (Japan) Yuki Stalph | (Japan) Koichi Miyao | YOUNGER |

== League table ==
| Pos | Team | Pld | W | D | L | GF | GA | GD | Pts | Promotion |
|---|---|---|---|---|---|---|---|---|---|---|
| 1 | Giravanz Kitakyushu (C, P) | 34 | 19 | 9 | 6 | 51 | 27 | +24 | 66 | Promotion to 2020 J2 League (Note: Only teams that hold a J2 license are eligible for promotion.) |
| 2 | Thespakusatsu Gunma (P) | 34 | 18 | 9 | 7 | 59 | 34 | +25 | 63 | Promotion to 2020 J2 League |
| 3 | Fujieda MYFC | 34 | 18 | 9 | 7 | 42 | 31 | +11 | 63 | Ineligible for promotion |
| 4 | Kataller Toyama | 34 | 16 | 10 | 8 | 54 | 31 | +23 | 58 | |
| 5 | Roasso Kumamoto | 34 | 16 | 9 | 9 | 45 | 39 | +6 | 57 | |
| 6 | Cerezo Osaka U-23 | 34 | 16 | 4 | 14 | 49 | 56 | −7 | 52 | Ineligible for promotion |
| 7 | Gainare Tottori | 34 | 14 | 8 | 12 | 49 | 59 | −10 | 50 | |
| 8 | Blaublitz Akita | 34 | 13 | 10 | 11 | 45 | 35 | +10 | 49 | |
| 9 | Nagano Parceiro | 34 | 13 | 10 | 11 | 35 | 34 | +1 | 49 | |
| 10 | Vanraure Hachinohe | 34 | 14 | 6 | 14 | 49 | 42 | +7 | 48 | Ineligible for promotion |
| 11 | Fukushima United | 34 | 13 | 4 | 17 | 45 | 53 | −8 | 43 | Ineligible for promotion |
| 12 | Azul Claro Numazu | 34 | 11 | 6 | 17 | 35 | 43 | −8 | 39 | Ineligible for promotion |
| 13 | YSCC Yokohama | 34 | 12 | 3 | 19 | 53 | 65 | −12 | 39 | Ineligible for promotion |
| 14 | Kamatamare Sanuki | 34 | 10 | 9 | 15 | 33 | 49 | −16 | 39 | |
| 15 | SC Sagamihara | 34 | 10 | 8 | 16 | 36 | 45 | −9 | 38 | Ineligible for promotion |
| 16 | FC Tokyo U-23 | 34 | 9 | 9 | 16 | 43 | 52 | −9 | 36 | Ineligible for promotion |
| 17 | Gamba Osaka U-23 | 34 | 9 | 8 | 17 | 54 | 55 | −1 | 35 | Ineligible for promotion |
| 18 | Iwate Grulla Morioka | 34 | 7 | 5 | 22 | 36 | 63 | −27 | 26 | Ineligible for promotion |

Source: 2019 MEIJI YASUDA J3 LEAGUE League table
Rules for classification: 1) Points; 2) Goal difference; 3) Goals scored; 4th) head-to-head results; 5th) disciplinary points; 6th) draw
(C) Champions; (P) Promoted

== Positions by round ==
| Team ╲ Round | 1 | 2 | 3 | 4 | 5 | 6 | 7 | 8 | 9 | 10 | 11 | 12 | 13 | 14 | 15 | 16 | 17 | 18 | 19 | 20 | 21 | 22 | 23 | 24 | 25 | 26 | 27 | 28 | 29 | 30 | 31 | 32 | 33 | 34 |
|---|---|---|---|---|---|---|---|---|---|---|---|---|---|---|---|---|---|---|---|---|---|---|---|---|---|---|---|---|---|---|---|---|---|---|
| Giravanz Kitakyushu | 1 | 1 | 1 | 1 | 1 | 2 | 3 | 1 | 1 | 2 | 2 | 1 | 2 | 2 | 2 | 2 | 3 | 3 | 4 | 4 | 4 | 4 | 3 | 2 | 2 | 2 | 1 | 1 | 1 | 1 | 1 | 1 | 1 | 1 |
| Thespakusatsu Gunma | 6 | 6 | 7 | 11 | 8 | 12 | 13 | 16 | 13 | 10 | 9 | 6 | 4 | 6 | 5 | 5 | 6 | 5 | 3 | 2 | 1 | 1 | 1 | 1 | 1 | 1 | 3 | 3 | 3 | 3 | 3 | 3 | 2 | 2 |
| Fujieda MYFC | 4 | 3 | 2 | 4 | 4 | 4 | 1 | 3 | 5 | 6 | 3 | 5 | 5 | 4 | 4 | 3 | 2 | 1 | 1 | 1 | 2 | 2 | 4 | 3 | 3 | 3 | 2 | 2 | 2 | 2 | 2 | 2 | 3 | 3 |
| Kataller Toyama | 12 | 16 | 10 | 10 | 11 | 6 | 7 | 8 | 6 | 4 | 5 | 4 | 7 | 8 | 8 | 10 | 9 | 9 | 10 | 10 | 8 | 6 | 5 | 5 | 5 | 5 | 5 | 5 | 5 | 5 | 5 | 5 | 5 | 4 |
| Roasso Kumamoto | 6 | 11 | 14 | 9 | 13 | 11 | 5 | 5 | 4 | 1 | 1 | 2 | 1 | 1 | 1 | 1 | 1 | 2 | 2 | 3 | 3 | 3 | 2 | 4 | 4 | 4 | 4 | 4 | 4 | 4 | 4 | 4 | 4 | 5 |
| Cerezo Osaka U-23 | 3 | 2 | 3 | 2 | 3 | 1 | 2 | 4 | 3 | 5 | 6 | 8 | 6 | 7 | 6 | 4 | 4 | 6 | 6 | 5 | 5 | 5 | 7 | 9 | 8 | 8 | 10 | 8 | 7 | 7 | 7 | 6 | 7 | 6 |
| Gainare Tottori | 2 | 9 | 13 | 14 | 15 | 17 | 16 | 11 | 14 | 11 | 16 | 12 | 14 | 11 | 10 | 7 | 5 | 4 | 5 | 6 | 6 | 7 | 6 | 6 | 6 | 6 | 6 | 6 | 6 | 6 | 6 | 7 | 6 | 7 |
| Blaublitz Akita | 6 | 11 | 17 | 16 | 12 | 9 | 9 | 9 | 12 | 17 | 12 | 14 | 16 | 13 | 14 | 12 | 14 | 10 | 12 | 12 | 14 | 13 | 9 | 7 | 9 | 9 | 7 | 9 | 9 | 9 | 8 | 9 | 8 | 8 |
| Nagano Parceiro | 6 | 15 | 16 | 15 | 16 | 14 | 17 | 12 | 10 | 13 | 12 | 14 | 17 | 18 | 18 | 18 | 18 | 16 | 15 | 15 | 15 | 15 | 15 | 14 | 14 | 15 | 15 | 12 | 12 | 11 | 11 | 10 | 10 | 9 |
| Vanraure Hachinohe | 6 | 5 | 6 | 5 | 7 | 8 | 12 | 15 | 17 | 16 | 17 | 13 | 10 | 12 | 13 | 11 | 11 | 13 | 13 | 9 | 12 | 10 | 12 | 10 | 10 | 10 | 8 | 7 | 8 | 8 | 9 | 8 | 9 | 10 |
| Fukushima United | 16 | 7 | 11 | 6 | 10 | 15 | 10 | 13 | 15 | 12 | 11 | 16 | 18 | 16 | 17 | 15 | 13 | 14 | 11 | 7 | 11 | 8 | 10 | 8 | 7 | 7 | 9 | 10 | 10 | 10 | 10 | 11 | 11 | 11 |
| Azul Claro Numazu | 15 | 13 | 9 | 13 | 14 | 10 | 15 | 10 | 9 | 14 | 14 | 11 | 12 | 9 | 12 | 13 | 12 | 11 | 14 | 14 | 10 | 11 | 8 | 11 | 11 | 11 | 11 | 13 | 14 | 14 | 16 | 13 | 12 | 12 |
| YSCC Yokohama | 14 | 17 | 12 | 17 | 17 | 16 | 11 | 14 | 16 | 15 | 15 | 17 | 13 | 15 | 15 | 17 | 17 | 18 | 18 | 18 | 18 | 17 | 16 | 16 | 16 | 16 | 16 | 17 | 17 | 15 | 17 | 17 | 15 | 13 |
| Kamatamare Sanuki | 4 | 3 | 4 | 3 | 2 | 3 | 4 | 2 | 2 | 3 | 4 | 3 | 3 | 3 | 3 | 6 | 7 | 7 | 9 | 11 | 9 | 12 | 13 | 12 | 12 | 14 | 14 | 14 | 15 | 16 | 13 | 15 | 13 | 14 |
| SC Sagamihara | 12 | 13 | 8 | 11 | 9 | 13 | 14 | 17 | 11 | 8 | 10 | 7 | 9 | 10 | 9 | 9 | 10 | 12 | 8 | 13 | 13 | 14 | 14 | 15 | 15 | 12 | 12 | 11 | 13 | 13 | 14 | 12 | 14 | 15 |
| FC Tokyo U-23 | 18 | 18 | 18 | 18 | 18 | 18 | 18 | 18 | 18 | 18 | 18 | 18 | 15 | 17 | 16 | 16 | 16 | 17 | 17 | 17 | 17 | 18 | 18 | 18 | 18 | 18 | 17 | 16 | 16 | 17 | 15 | 16 | 17 | 16 |
| Gamba Osaka U-23 | 6 | 10 | 14 | 8 | 6 | 7 | 8 | 7 | 8 | 7 | 7 | 9 | 8 | 5 | 7 | 8 | 8 | 8 | 7 | 8 | 7 | 9 | 11 | 13 | 13 | 13 | 13 | 15 | 11 | 12 | 12 | 14 | 16 | 17 |
| Iwate Grulla Morioka | 16 | 8 | 5 | 7 | 5 | 5 | 6 | 6 | 7 | 9 | 8 | 10 | 11 | 14 | 11 | 14 | 15 | 15 | 16 | 16 | 16 | 16 | 17 | 17 | 17 | 17 | 18 | 18 | 18 | 18 | 18 | 18 | 18 | 18 |

| Leader and promotion to J2 |
| Promotion to J2 |

== Top scorers ==
As of matches played December 1st, 2019.

| Rank | Player | Club | Goals |
|---|---|---|---|
| 1 | (Japan) Taichi Hara | FC Tokyo U-23 | 19 |
| 2 | (Japan) Yuya Takazawa | Thespakusatsu Gunma | 17 |
| 3 | (Japan) Yasuhito Morishima | Fujieda MYFC | 16 |
| 4 | (Japan) Hayate Take | Fukushima United FC | 15 |
| 4 | (Japan) Kohei Shin | YSCC Yokohama | 15 |
| 6 | (Japan) Hayato Asakawa | YSCC Yokohama | 13 |
| 7 | (Japan) Akito Takagi | Gamba Osaka U-23 | 11 |
| 7 | (Japan) Mizuki Ando | Cerezo Osaka U-23 | 11 |
| 7 | (Japan) Tsugutoshi Oishi | SC Sagamihara | 11 |
| 7 | (Japan) Tomoya Kitamura | Roasso Kumamoto | 11 |
| 7 | (Japan) Yosuke Kamigata | Vanraure Hachinohe | 11 |
| 7 | (Japan) Ryota Nakamura | Blaublitz Akita | 11 |
| 7 | (Japan) Masamichi Hayashi | Gainare Tottori | 11 |

== Attendances ==
| Pos | Team | Total | High | Low | Average | Change |
|---|---|---|---|---|---|---|
| 1 | Giravanz Kitakyushu | 102,831 | 12,270 | 3,744 | 6,049 | +34.4% |
| 2 | Roasso Kumamoto | 94,065 | 16,027 | 3,085 | 5,533 | +5.0%^{†} |
| 3 | Thespakusatsu Gunma | 61,098 | 5,881 | 1,875 | 3,594 | +7.4% |
| 4 | Nagano Parceiro | 51,006 | 4,247 | 1,434 | 3,000 | −15.6% |
| 5 | SC Sagamihara | 48,940 | 5,504 | 1,609 | 2,879 | −16.7% |
| 6 | Kataller Toyama | 46,535 | 5,254 | 1,774 | 2,737 | +2.5% |
| 7 | Azul Claro Numazu | 41,992 | 5,315 | 932 | 2,470 | −13.5% |
| 8 | Gainare Tottori | 37,889 | 4,011 | 946 | 2,229 | −16.1% |
| 9 | Kamatamare Sanuki | 35,906 | 3,339 | 1,120 | 2,112 | −31.3%^{†} |
| 10 | Vanraure Hachinohe | 29,919 | 2,797 | 907 | 1,760 | −20.3%^{‡} |
| 11 | Fujieda MYFC | 29,581 | 3,973 | 748 | 1,740 | +39.6% |
| 12 | Blaublitz Akita | 26,793 | 3,858 | 736 | 1,576 | −44.5% |
| 13 | Iwate Grulla Morioka | 23,249 | 3,212 | 516 | 1,368 | +12.5% |
| 14 | FC Tokyo U-23 | 21,684 | 2,072 | 267 | 1,276 | −25.9% |
| 15 | Gamba Osaka U-23 | 21,472 | 2,662 | 700 | 1,263 | −8.6% |
| 16 | Fukushima United | 21,115 | 3,406 | 436 | 1,242 | −21.2% |
| 17 | Cerezo Osaka U-23 | 20,340 | 4,755 | 647 | 1,196 | +7.6% |
| 18 | YSCC Yokohama | 18,617 | 1,610 | 337 | 1,095 | +9.0% |
| | League total | 733,032 | 16,027 | 267 | 2,396 | −3.8% |

Updated to games played on 8 December 2019
Source: J. League Data
Notes:
^{†} Relegated from J2。^{‡}Promoted from JFL.
