= 2014 All Japan High School Soccer Tournament =

Tournament details
- Country: Japan
- Dates: 30 December 2014 – 12 January 2015
- Teams: 48

Final positions
- Champions: Seiryo High School (1st title)
- Runner-up: Maebashi Ikuei High School

Tournament statistics
- Top goal scorer(s): 7 players tied (3 goals)

The 2014 All Japan High School Soccer Tournament (All Japan JFA 93rd High School Soccer Tournament (Japanese: 第93回全国高等学校サッカー選手権大会) marked the 93rd edition of the annual championship tournament for all high schools in Japan.

== Calendar ==
Round	Date	Matches	Teams
First round	30–31 December 2014	16	32 (32) → 16
Second round	2 January 2015	16	32 (16+16) → 16
Third round	3 January 2015	8	16 → 8
Quarter-finals	5 January 2015	4	8 → 4
Semi-finals	10 January 2015	2	4 → 2
Final	12 January 2015	1	2 → 1

== Venues ==
The tournament was played in four prefectures and nine stadiums, with six (two for each prefecture) located in Chiba, Kanagawa, and Tokyo Prefectures, and three located in Saitama. They are:

- Tokyo – Ajinomoto Field Nishigaoka, and Komazawa Olympic Park Stadium
- Saitama – Saitama Stadium 2002, Urawa Komaba Stadium and NACK5 Stadium Omiya
- Kanagawa – NHK Spring Mitsuzawa Football Stadium and Kawasaki Todoroki Stadium
- Chiba – Fukuda Denshi Arena and ZA Oripri Stadium

== Participating clubs ==
In parentheses: the amount of times each team qualified for the All Japan High School Tournament (appearance in the 2014 edition included)

Hokkaido: Otani Muroran High School (30); Aomori: Aomori Yamada High School (20); Iwate: Tono High School (24); Akita: Araya High School (1); Miyagi: Seiwa Gakuen High School (2); Yamagata: Tokai Univ. Yamagata High School (1); Fukushima: Shoshi High School (6); Ibaraki: Daiichi Gakuin High School (1); Tochigi: Yaita Chuo High School (6); Gunma: Maebashi Ikuei High School (18); Saitama: Shohei High School (1); Chiba: Ryutsu Keizai Univ. Kashiwa High School (4); Tokyo A: Kokugakuin Univ. Kugayama High School (6); Tokyo B: Mitaka High School (2); Kanagawa: Nihon Univ. Fujisawa High School (4); Niigata: Kaishi Gakuen JSC High School (1); Nagano: Tokyo City Univ. Shiojiri High School (3); Yamanashi: Yamanashi Gakuin Univ. High School (4); Toyama: Mizuhashi High School (6); Ishikawa: Seiryo High School (25); Fukui: Maruoka High School (27); Gifu: Gifu Kogyo High School (25); Shizuoka: Shizuoka Gakuen High School (11); Aichi: Chukyo Univ. Chukyo High School (14)	Mie: Uji-Yamada Shogyo High School (1); Shiga: Yasu High School (8); Kyoto: Kyoto Tachibana High School (4); Osaka: Riseisha High School (2); Hyōgo: Takigawa Daini High School (18); Nara: Koriyama High School (1); Wakayama: Hatsushiba Hashimoto High School (13); Tottori: Yonago Kita High School (10); Shimane: Rissho Univ. Shonan High School (14); Okayama: Sakuyo High School (22); Hiroshima: Hiroshima Minami High School (11); Yamaguchi: Takagawa Gakuen High School (22); Tokushima: Tokushima Ichiritsu High School (14); Kagawa: Kagawa Nishi High School (10); Ehime: Matsuyama Kogyo High School (4); Kōchi: Meitoku Gijuku High School (5); Fukuoka: Higashi Fukuoka High School (16); Saga: Saga Higashi High School (8); Nagasaki: Nagasaki IAS High School (3); Kumamoto: Shugakukan High School (1); Ōita: Nakatsu Higashi High School (4); Miyazaki: Nissho Gakuen High School (11); Kagoshima: Kagoshima Josei High School (5); Okinawa: Maehara High School (2)

== Schedule ==
=== First round ===
30 December 2014 Match 1	Mitaka	0–2	Higashi Fukuoka	Setagaya
14:05		Report (JFA); Report (JFA)	Kensei Nakashima 42'; Keisuke Ogasawara 59'	Stadium: Komazawa Olympic Park Stadium

31 December 2014 Match 2	RKU Kashiwa	3–3 (8–7 p)	Sakuyo	Chiba
12:05	Yuya Takazawa 21'; Takeaki Hommura 25'; Takashi Fukui 80+3'	Report (JFA); Report (JFA)	Yuji Yamashita 27'; Ryotaro Ito 63', 73'	Stadium: Fukuda Denshi Arena

31 December 2014 Match 3	Yaita Chuo	3–2	Matsuyama Kita	Chiba
14:10	Yuki Kawakami 51'; Takuya Hitomi 61'; Kyowaan Hoshi 80'	Report (JFA); Report (JFA)	Taku Murakami 5'; Yuki Yanagida 32'	Stadium: Fukuda Denshi Arena

31 December 2014 Match 4	Seiwa Gakuen	4–1	Shugakukan	Kashiwa
12:05	Kazumasa Sakamoto 10', 14', 47'; Kiyoshi Ono 77'	Report (JFA); Report (JFA)	Vitor Reis 74'	Stadium: Kashiwanoha Stadium

31 December 2014 Match 5	Shoshi	2–0	Hiroshima Minami	Kashiwa
14:10	Takaaki Sato 69'; Own goal 77'	Report (JFA); Report (JFA)		Stadium: Kashiwanoha Stadium

31 December 2014 Match 6	Yamanashi Gakuin	1–0	Takigawa Daini	Kita
12:05	Takuto Hara 68'	Report (JFA); Report (JFA)		Stadium: Ajinomoto Field Nishigaoka

31 December 2014 Match 7	Gifu Kogyo	2–1	Kagawa Nishi	Kita
14:10	Kaoru Nagata 53'; Ryoya Tachibana 58'	Report (JFA); Report (JFA)	Shota Matsuda 16'	Stadium: Ajinomoto Field Nishigaoka

31 December 2014 Match 8	Kokugakuin Kugayama	1–0	Maehara	Kita
12:05	Kazuki Kobayashi 3'	Report (JFA); Report (JFA)		Stadium: Komazawa Olympic Park Stadium

31 December 2014 Match 9	Araya	0–2	Nissho Gakuen	Kita
14:10		Report (JFA); Report (JFA)	Shota Kawano 29', 63'	Stadium: Komazawa Olympic Park Stadium

31 December 2014 Match 10	Nihon Fujisawa	2–2 (4–3 p)	Tokushima Ichiritsu	Yokohama
12:05	Koki Nakamura 51'; Diego Taba 70'	Report (JFA); Report (JFA)	Kohei Koori 46'; Masahiro Nakamine 79'	Stadium: NHK Spring Mitsuzawa Football Stadium

31 December 2014 Match 11	TCU Shiojiri	1–2	Takagawa Gakuen	Yokohama
14:10	Ryo Shirota 59'	Report (JFA); Report (JFA)	Yuya Iseki 4'; Kaito Umeda 54'	Stadium: NHK Spring Mitsuzawa Football Stadium

31 December 2014 Match 12	Tono	1–3	Nakatsu Higashi	Sagamihara
12:05	Kazuki Sudo 26'	Report (JFA); Report (JFA)	Taku Kitagawa 12', 77'; Kento Nakamura 49'	Stadium: Sagamihara Gion Stadium

31 December 2014 Match 13	Tokai Yamagata	0–0 (2–4 p)	Koriyama	Saitama
14:10		Report (JFA); Report (JFA)		Stadium: Urawa Komaba Stadium

31 December 2014 Match 14	Aomori Yamada	1–1 (2–4 p)	Nakatsu Higashi	Saitama
12:05	Shoma Suzuki 77'	Report (JFA); Report (JFA)	Naoki Oku 33'	Stadium: Urawa Komaba Stadium

31 December 2014 Match 15	Chukyo	1–0	Nagasaki IAS	Saitama
14:10	Hayata Obara 50'	Report (JFA); Report (JFA)		Stadium: NACK5 Stadium Omiya

31 December 2014 Match 16	Shohei	0–1	Yonago Kita	Saitama
12:05		Report (JFA); Report (JFA)	Takayoshi Kimigaki 49'	Stadium: NACK5 Stadium Omiya

=== Second round ===
2 January 2015 Match 17	Mizuhashi	2–1	Meitoku Gijuku	Chiba
14:10	Kenshiro Kitano 43'; Keisuke Sato 80+1'	Report (JFA); Report (JFA)	Takuma Kusunoki 46'	Stadium: Fukuda Denshi Arena

2 January 2015 Match 18	RKU Kashiwa	1–1 (5–3 p)	Yaita Chuo	Chiba
12:05	Ryoya Ogawa 48'	Report (JFA); Report (JFA)	Ryota Sekioka 57'	Stadium: Fukuda Denshi Arena

2 January 2015 Match 19	Seiwa Gakuen	0–3	Shoshi	Kashiwa
12:05		Report (JFA); Report (JFA)	Hiroyuki Ono 23'; Kazuhira Shibuya 36'; Ren Yamashiro 45'	Stadium: Kashiwanoha Stadium

2 January 2015 Match 20	Maruoka	1–2	Rissho Shonan	Kashiwa
14:10	Daichi Iida 66'	Report (JFA); Report (JFA)	Ryuji Nakashima 47', 53'	Stadium: Kashiwanoha Stadium

2 January 2015 Match 21	Maebashi Ikuei	1–0	Hatsushiba Hashimoto	Kita
14:10	Teppei Miyamoto 67'	Report (JFA); Report (JFA)		Stadium: Ajinomoto Field Nishigaoka

2 January 2015 Match 22	Yamanashi Gakuin	0–0 (7–6 p)	Gifu Kogyo	Setagaya
14:10		Report (JFA); Report (JFA)		Stadium: Komazawa Olympic Park Stadium

2 January 2015 Match 23	Kokugakuin Kugayama	1–1 (5–4 p)	Nissho Gakuen	Setagaya
12:05	Minoru Hanafusa 74'	Report (JFA); Report (JFA)	Shota Kawano 50'	Stadium: Komazawa Olympic Park Stadium

2 January 2015 Match 24	Daiichi Gakuin	0–3	Kyoto Tachibana	Kita
12:05		Report (JFA); Report (JFA)	Katsuya Nakano 55'; Tsubasa Tsutsumihara 76'; Taichi Maekawa 80+1'	Stadium: Ajinomoto Field Nishigaoka

2 January 2015 Match 25	Uji-Yamada Shogyo	2–3	Kaishi Gakuen	Sagamihara
12:05	Ryoki Nishiguchi 58'; Tetsuya Hayama 69'	Report (JFA); Report (JFA)	Koshi Ishizuka 1'; Shinya Someno 11'; Hayato Takahashi 63'	Stadium: Sagamihara Gion Stadium

2 January 2015 Match 26	Nihon Fujisawa	3–2	Takagawa Gakuen	Yokohama
14:10	Koki Nakamura 10'; Taku Sato 39'; Diego Taba 62'	Report (JFA); Report (JFA)	Kaito Umeda 44'; Kohei Okada 75'	Stadium: NHK Spring Mitsuzawa Football Stadium

2 January 2015 Match 27	Kusatsu Higashi	0–3	Higashi Fukuoka	Yokohama
12:05		Report (JFA); Report (JFA)	Tsubasa Akagi 54'; Asahi Masuyama 56'; Kensei Nakashima 80+2'	Stadium: NHK Spring Mitsuzawa Football Stadium

2 January 2015 Match 28	Shizuoka Gakuen	6–0	Saga Higashi	Sagamihara
14:10	Shintaro Nago 27'; Atsuki Satsukawa 28'; Kazuto Mitsuzawa 30'; Reo Hatate 53'; Takumi Ishii 69'; Futoshi Arai 75'	Report (JFA); Report (JFA)		Stadium: Sagamihara Gion Stadium

2 January 2015 Match 29	Otani Muroran	0–0 (3–5 p)	Riseisha	Saitama
14:10		Report (JFA); Report (JFA)		Stadium: NACK5 Stadium Omiya

2 January 2015 Match 30	Koriyama	1–2	Nakatsu Higashi	Saitama
14:10	Satoshi Kato 9'	Report (JFA); Report (JFA)	Own goal 33'; Tatsuki Matsunami 45'	Stadium: Urawa Komaba Stadium

2 January 2015 Match 31	Chukyo	1–2	Yonago Kita	Saitama
12:05	Yuki Kimura 13'	Report (JFA); Report (JFA)	Takayoshi Kimigaki 18'; Keiki Sadamoto 40'	Stadium: Urawa Komaba Stadium

2 January 2015 Match 32	Kagoshima Josei	0–0 (3–5 p)	Seiryo	Saitama
12:05		Report (JFA); Report (JFA)		Stadium: NACK5 Stadium Omiya

=== Round of 16 ===
3 January 2015 Match 33	Mizuhashi	0–1	RKU Kashiwa	Chiba
12:05		Report	Yuya Takazawa 76'	Stadium: Fukuda Denshi Arena

3 January 2015 Match 34	Shoshi	0–2	Rissho Shonan	Chiba
14:10		Report	Kento Hirata 32'; Masaki Takada 52'	Stadium: Fukuda Denshi Arena

3 January 2015 Match 35	Maebashi Ikuei	1–1 (6–5 p)	Yamanashi Gakuin	Setagaya
14:10	Teppei Miyamoto 50'	Report	Yuki Usami 42'	Stadium: Komazawa Olympic Park Stadium

3 January 2015 Match 36	Kokugakuin Kugayama	0–0 (1–3 p)	Kyoto Tachibana	Setagaya
12:05		Report		Stadium: Komazawa Olympic Park Stadium

3 January 2015 Match 37	Kaishi Gakuen	0–3	Nihon Fujisawa	Yokohama
14:10		Report	Koki Nakamura 22'; Taku Sato 27'; Diego Taba 40'	Stadium: Nippatsu Mitsuzawa Stadium

3 January 2015 Match 38	Higashi Fukuoka	0–3	Shizuoka Gakuen	Yokohama
12:05		Report	Reo Hatate 64'; Shintaro Nago 72'; Ryo Kano 75'	Stadium: Nippatsu Mitsuzawa Stadium

3 January 2015 Match 39	Riseisha	5–1	Nakatsu Higashi	Saitama
14:10	Shunta Tanaka 27'; Daichi Hayashi 43', 52'; Akira Ogawa 61'; Koshiro Kadono 80+3'	Report	Kazuki Matsunaga 19'	Stadium: Urawa Komaba Stadium

3 January 2015 Match 40	Yonago Kita	1–2	Seiryo	Saitama
12:05	Takayoshi Kimigaki 66'	Report	Jukiya Fujishima 11'; Sakaki Ota 75'	Stadium: Urawa Komaba Stadium

=== Quarter-finals ===
5 January 2015 Match 41	RKU Kashiwa	3–0	Rissho Shonan	Chiba
14:10	Shunjiro Shibuya 25'; Kento Yamada 31'; Yuya Takazawa 61'	Report		Stadium: Fukuda Denshi Arena

5 January 2015 Match 42	Maebashi Ikuei	4–0	Kyoto Tachibana	Chiba
12:05	Ryota Aoyagi 8', 37'; Tatsuhiro Sakamoto 70'; Kohei Yokozawa 80+2'	Report		Stadium: Fukuda Denshi Arena

5 January 2015 Match 43	Nihon Fujisawa	2–1	Shizuoka Gakuen	Saitama
14:10	Michael Jun Maeda 69'; Yuta Imai 78'	Report	Futa Hondo 71'	Stadium: Urawa Komaba Stadium

5 January 2015 Match 44	Riseisha	0–1	Seiryo	Saitama
12:05		Report	Sakaki Ota 50'	Stadium: Urawa Komaba Stadium

=== Semi-finals ===
10 January 2015 Match 45	RKU Kashiwa	1–1 (4–5 p)	Maebashi Ikuei	Saitama
14:20	Ryoya Ogawa 72'	Report	Tokuma Suzuki 90'	Stadium: Saitama Stadium 2002

10 January 2015 Match 46	Nihon Fujisawa	0–3	Seiryo	Saitama
12:05		Report	Own goal 22' (o.g.); Keita Sugihara 35'; Sakaki Ota 45+1'	Stadium: Saitama Stadium 2002

=== Final ===
12 January 2015
13:35

Maebashi Ikuei	2−4 (a.e.t.)	Seiryo
Tatsuhiko Noguchi 53'; Ryoma Watanabe 55'	Report (JFA); Report (JFA)	Yuta Maekawa 11'; Wataru Harada 64'; Taiki Moriyama 95', 110'

Saitama Stadium 2002, Saitama
Attendance: 46,316
Referee: Takuto Okabe

GK	1	(Japan) Shun Yoshida
DF	3	(Japan) Kohei Iwa
DF	4	(Japan) Teppei Miyamoto
DF	6	(Japan) Shomu Watanabe	(substituted off) 60'
DF	16	(Japan) Taiga Uehara
MF	10	(Japan) Ryoma Watanabe
MF	11	(Japan) Tatsuhiro Sakamoto	(substituted off) 102'
MF	13	(Japan) Hiroshi Yoshinaga	(substituted off) 66'
MF	14	(Japan) Tokuma Suzuki (c)
FW	9	(Japan) Ryota Aoyagi
FW	24	(Japan) Tatsuhiko Noguchi	(substituted off) 76'
Substitutes:
DF	2	(Japan) Takato Shimoyama	(substituted in) 60'
MF	8	(Japan) Yoshio Koizumi	(substituted in) 66'
MF	23	(Japan) Kohei Yokozawa	(substituted in) 76'
FW	25	(Japan) Seiji Sato	(substituted in) 102'
Manager:
(Japan) Kosuke Yamada

GK	1	(Japan) Riku Sakaguchi
DF	2	(Japan) Hiromichi Miyatani
DF	3	(Japan) Wataru Harada
DF	4	(Japan) Yoshihiro Takahashi
DF	5	(Japan) Daisei Suzuki (c)
MF	7	(Japan) Jukiya Fujishima
MF	8	(Japan) Kento Hirata	(substituted off) 98'
MF	9	(Japan) Yuta Maekawa
MF	15	(Japan) Keita Sugihara	(substituted off) 66'
MF	10	(Japan) Sakaki Ota	(substituted off) 100'
FW	11	(Japan) Taiki Moriyama
Substitutes:
MF	6	(Japan) Ryosuke Kato	(substituted in) 66'
MF	18	(Japan) Naoya Nakajo	(substituted in) 98'
FW	25	(Japan) Takahiro Okura	(substituted in) 100'
Manager:
(Japan) Rikito Kihara

Assistant referees:
Ryo Hirama
Jun Mihara
Fourth official:
Koji Morikawa

== Top scorers ==
Rank	Player	High School	Goals
1	(Japan) Shota Kawano	Nissho Gakuen	3
1	(Japan) Takayoshi Kimigaki	Yonago Kita	3
1	(Japan) Koki Nakamura	Nihon Fujisawa	3
1	(Japan) Sakaki Ota	Seiryo	3
1	(Japan) Kazumasa Sakamoto	Seiwa Gakuen	3
1	(Japan) Diego Taba	Nihon Fujisawa	3
1	(Japan) Yuya Takazawa	RKU Kashiwa	3
