= 2017 Grulla Morioka season =

Grulla Morioka
2017 season
- Manager: Toshimi Kikuchi
- Stadium: Iwagin Stadium
- J3 League: 15th
Home colours	Away colours

2017 Grulla Morioka season.

== J3 League ==
=== League table ===
Pos	Team	Pld	W	D	L	GF	GA	GD	Pts
13	Cerezo Osaka U-23	32	8	11	13	39	43	−4	35
14	YSCC Yokohama	32	8	8	16	41	54	−13	32
15	Grulla Morioka	32	7	8	17	32	49	−17	29
16	Gamba Osaka U-23	32	7	5	20	31	65	−34	26
17	Gainare Tottori	32	4	9	19	31	63	−32	21

Source: 2017 MEIJI YASUDA J3 LEAGUE League table
Rules for classification: 1) Points; 2) Goal difference; 3) Goals scored; 4th) head-to-head results; 5th) disciplinary points; 6th) draw

=== Match details ===
J3 League match details
Match	Date	Team	Score	Team	Venue	Attendance
1	2017.03.12	Cerezo Osaka U-23	2-2	Grulla Morioka	Kincho Stadium	1,038
2	2017.03.18	FC Ryukyu	1-2	Grulla Morioka	Okinawa Athletic Park Stadium	4,438
3	2017.03.26	Grulla Morioka	0-3	Kataller Toyama	Iwagin Stadium	1,018
4	2017.04.02	Blaublitz Akita	1-0	Grulla Morioka	Akigin Stadium	2,416
5	2017.04.16	Grulla Morioka	1-0	Fujieda MYFC	Iwagin Stadium	805
6	2017.04.30	Gainare Tottori	2-2	Grulla Morioka	Tottori Bank Bird Stadium	2,067
7	2017.05.07	Grulla Morioka	0-0	AC Nagano Parceiro	Iwagin Stadium	1,125
8	2017.05.14	SC Sagamihara	1-1	Grulla Morioka	Sagamihara Gion Stadium	3,898
9	2017.05.21	Grulla Morioka	0-0	FC Tokyo U-23	Iwagin Stadium	1,206
11	2017.06.03	Grulla Morioka	0-1	YSCC Yokohama	Iwagin Stadium	1,148
12	2017.06.11	Grulla Morioka	1-2	Tochigi SC	Iwagin Stadium	1,451
13	2017.06.18	Gamba Osaka U-23	1-0	Grulla Morioka	Expo '70 Commemorative Stadium	735
14	2017.06.25	Grulla Morioka	5-1	Fukushima United FC	Iwagin Stadium	1,516
15	2017.07.02	Grulla Morioka	0-0	Kagoshima United FC	Iwagin Stadium	1,335
16	2017.07.08	Giravanz Kitakyushu	5-1	Grulla Morioka	Mikuni World Stadium Kitakyushu	4,857
17	2017.07.16	Azul Claro Numazu	1-0	Grulla Morioka	Ashitaka Park Stadium	2,338
18	2017.07.23	Grulla Morioka	1-2	Gainare Tottori	Iwagin Stadium	520
19	2017.08.20	Grulla Morioka	0-2	Gamba Osaka U-23	Kitakami Stadium	3,590
20	2017.08.26	Tochigi SC	3-2	Grulla Morioka	Tochigi Green Stadium	4,226
21	2017.09.03	Grulla Morioka	0-3	Giravanz Kitakyushu	Iwagin Stadium	1,106
22	2017.09.10	Grulla Morioka	1-3	Blaublitz Akita	Iwagin Stadium	1,217
23	2017.09.16	Fujieda MYFC	0-2	Grulla Morioka	Fujieda Soccer Stadium	722
24	2017.09.24	Grulla Morioka	2-1	Azul Claro Numazu	Iwagin Stadium	1,017
25	2017.10.01	FC Tokyo U-23	3-1	Grulla Morioka	Ajinomoto Field Nishigaoka	1,690
26	2017.10.08	AC Nagano Parceiro	1-1	Grulla Morioka	Minami Nagano Sports Park Stadium	3,356
27	2017.10.15	Grulla Morioka	0-0	FC Ryukyu	Iwagin Stadium	2,112
28	2017.10.22	Kataller Toyama	0-2	Grulla Morioka	Toyama Stadium	1,917
30	2017.11.05	Kagoshima United FC	1-0	Grulla Morioka	Kagoshima Kamoike Stadium	3,615
31	2017.11.12	Grulla Morioka	0-2	SC Sagamihara	Iwagin Stadium	1,199
32	2017.11.19	YSCC Yokohama	1-2	Grulla Morioka	Yokohama Mitsuzawa Athletic Stadium	1,230
33	2017.11.26	Grulla Morioka	2-3	Cerezo Osaka U-23	Iwagin Stadium	1,020
34	2017.12.03	Fukushima United FC	3-1	Grulla Morioka	Toho Stadium	2,206
