= 2018 Grulla Morioka season =

Grulla Morioka
2018 season
- Manager: Toshimi Kikuchi
- Stadium: Iwagin Stadium
- J3 League: 13th
Home colours	Away colours

2018 Grulla Morioka season.

== J3 League ==
Match	Date	Team	Score	Team	Venue	Attendance
1	2018.03.11	Gamba Osaka U-23	3-2	Grulla Morioka	Panasonic Stadium Suita	1,330
2	2018.03.17	Azul Claro Numazu	1-0	Grulla Morioka	Ashitaka Park Stadium	2,481
3	2018.03.21	Grulla Morioka	3-2	YSCC Yokohama	Iwagin Stadium	1,606
4	2018.03.25	Gainare Tottori	1-0	Grulla Morioka	Chubu Yajin Stadium	3,855
5	2018.04.01	Grulla Morioka	1-1	Thespakusatsu Gunma	Iwagin Stadium	733
6	2018.04.08	Grulla Morioka	2-1	Blaublitz Akita	Iwagin Stadium	955
8	2018.04.28	Grulla Morioka	1-4	Kagoshima United FC	Iwagin Stadium	743
9	2018.05.03	FC Tokyo U-23	2-0	Grulla Morioka	Ajinomoto Field Nishigaoka	2,114
10	2018.05.06	SC Sagamihara	1-0	Grulla Morioka	Sagamihara Gion Stadium	4,015
11	2018.05.20	Grulla Morioka	0-4	Fujieda MYFC	Iwagin Stadium	1,194
12	2018.06.03	Fukushima United FC	0-0	Grulla Morioka	Toho Stadium	1,891
13	2018.06.10	Grulla Morioka	2-0	Giravanz Kitakyushu	Iwagin Stadium	1,129
14	2018.06.16	Grulla Morioka	3-0	AC Nagano Parceiro	Iwagin Stadium	1,239
15	2018.06.23	Kataller Toyama	1-3	Grulla Morioka	Toyama Stadium	2,227
16	2018.07.01	Grulla Morioka	1-4	FC Ryukyu	Iwagin Stadium	925
17	2018.07.07	Cerezo Osaka U-23	1-2	Grulla Morioka	Kincho Stadium	513
18	2018.07.15	Grulla Morioka	0-3	SC Sagamihara	Iwagin Stadium	1,304
19	2018.07.22	Grulla Morioka	2-1	Gamba Osaka U-23	Kitakami Stadium	3,115
20	2018.08.25	FC Ryukyu	5-2	Grulla Morioka	Tapic Kenso Hiyagon Stadium	886
21	2018.09.02	Blaublitz Akita	2-1	Grulla Morioka	Akigin Stadium	2,461
22	2018.09.09	Grulla Morioka	3-3	Gainare Tottori	Iwagin Stadium	515
23	2018.09.16	Grulla Morioka	0-3	Azul Claro Numazu	Iwagin Stadium	844
24	2018.09.21	Thespakusatsu Gunma	0-1	Grulla Morioka	Shoda Shoyu Stadium Gunma	1,604
25	2018.09.30	Grulla Morioka	2-2	Fukushima United FC	Iwagin Stadium	787
26	2018.10.07	Fujieda MYFC	2-1	Grulla Morioka	Fujieda Soccer Stadium	876
27	2018.10.14	Grulla Morioka	2-1	Kataller Toyama	Iwagin Stadium	1,308
28	2018.10.20	Kagoshima United FC	1-0	Grulla Morioka	Shiranami Stadium	3,824
29	2018.10.28	Giravanz Kitakyushu	2-1	Grulla Morioka	Mikuni World Stadium Kitakyushu	3,047
30	2018.11.03	Grulla Morioka	0-2	FC Tokyo U-23	Iwagin Stadium	1,712
31	2018.11.11	YSCC Yokohama	2-3	Grulla Morioka	Yokohama Mitsuzawa Athletic Stadium	805
32	2018.11.18	Grulla Morioka	2-1	Cerezo Osaka U-23	Iwagin Stadium	1,352
34	2018.12.02	AC Nagano Parceiro	0-1	Grulla Morioka	Nagano U Stadium	4,425
