= 2016 YSCC Yokohama season =

YSCC Yokohama
2016 season
- Manager: Yasuhiro Higuchi
- Stadium: NHK Spring Mitsuzawa Football Stadium
- J3 League: 16th

2016 YSCC Yokohama season.

== J3 League ==
=== League table ===
Pos	Team	Pld	W	D	L	GF	GA	GD	Pts
11	SC Sagamihara	30	9	8	13	29	46	−17	35
12	Cerezo Osaka U-23	30	8	8	14	38	47	−9	32
13	Grulla Morioka	30	6	12	12	43	47	−4	30
14	Fukushima United	30	7	9	14	35	44	−9	30
15	Gainare Tottori	30	8	6	16	30	47	−17	30
16	YSCC Yokohama	30	5	5	20	15	51	−36	20

Updated to match(es) played on 20 November 2016. Source: 2016 MEIJI YASUDA J3 LEAGUE League table
Rules for classification: 1) Points; 2) Goal difference; 3) Goals scored; 4th) head-to-head results; 5th) disciplinary points; 6th) draw

=== Match details ===
J3 League match details
Match	Date	Team	Score	Team	Venue	Attendance
1	2016.03.13	Gamba Osaka U-23	0-0	YSCC Yokohama	Suita City Football Stadium	3,359
2	2016.03.20	SC Sagamihara	0-1	YSCC Yokohama	Sagamihara Gion Stadium	2,912
3	2016.04.03	YSCC Yokohama	0-1	Kagoshima United FC	NHK Spring Mitsuzawa Football Stadium	1,309
4	2016.04.10	YSCC Yokohama	1-2	Blaublitz Akita	NHK Spring Mitsuzawa Football Stadium	805
5	2016.04.17	Fujieda MYFC	4-0	YSCC Yokohama	Fujieda Soccer Stadium	904
6	2016.04.24	YSCC Yokohama	0-2	AC Nagano Parceiro	NHK Spring Mitsuzawa Football Stadium	931
7	2016.05.01	Cerezo Osaka U-23	1-1	YSCC Yokohama	Kincho Stadium	1,602
8	2016.05.08	YSCC Yokohama	1-0	FC Tokyo U-23	NHK Spring Mitsuzawa Football Stadium	878
9	2016.05.15	YSCC Yokohama	0-1	Gainare Tottori	NHK Spring Mitsuzawa Football Stadium	804
10	2016.05.22	Grulla Morioka	3-0	YSCC Yokohama	Iwagin Stadium	1,498
11	2016.05.29	YSCC Yokohama	0-2	Fukushima United FC	NHK Spring Mitsuzawa Football Stadium	978
12	2016.06.12	YSCC Yokohama	0-1	Tochigi SC	NHK Spring Mitsuzawa Football Stadium	1,614
13	2016.06.19	FC Ryukyu	0-1	YSCC Yokohama	Okinawa Athletic Park Stadium	1,554
14	2016.06.26	Kataller Toyama	1-0	YSCC Yokohama	Toyama Stadium	3,278
15	2016.07.03	YSCC Yokohama	1-0	Oita Trinita	NHK Spring Mitsuzawa Football Stadium	1,313
16	2016.07.10	Tochigi SC	2-0	YSCC Yokohama	Tochigi Green Stadium	4,753
17	2016.07.16	AC Nagano Parceiro	3-0	YSCC Yokohama	Minami Nagano Sports Park Stadium	4,020
18	2016.07.23	YSCC Yokohama	0-0	Grulla Morioka	NHK Spring Mitsuzawa Football Stadium	806
19	2016.07.31	Kagoshima United FC	4-0	YSCC Yokohama	Kagoshima Kamoike Stadium	4,259
20	2016.08.07	YSCC Yokohama	1-1	SC Sagamihara	NHK Spring Mitsuzawa Football Stadium	1,015
21	2016.09.10	Blaublitz Akita	3-0	YSCC Yokohama	Akigin Stadium	1,781
22	2016.09.17	YSCC Yokohama	3-4	Kataller Toyama	NHK Spring Mitsuzawa Football Stadium	1,045
23	2016.09.25	Gainare Tottori	2-1	YSCC Yokohama	Tottori Bank Bird Stadium	2,114
24	2016.10.02	FC Tokyo U-23	2-0	YSCC Yokohama	Ajinomoto Field Nishigaoka	1,443
25	2016.10.16	YSCC Yokohama	0-2	FC Ryukyu	NHK Spring Mitsuzawa Football Stadium	824
26	2016.10.23	Fukushima United FC	2-0	YSCC Yokohama	Toho Stadium	2,303
27	2016.10.30	YSCC Yokohama	0-3	Fujieda MYFC	Yokohama Mitsuzawa Athletic Stadium	568
28	2016.11.06	YSCC Yokohama	2-2	Cerezo Osaka U-23	NHK Spring Mitsuzawa Football Stadium	800
29	2016.11.13	Oita Trinita	3-0	YSCC Yokohama	Oita Bank Dome	11,065
30	2016.11.20	YSCC Yokohama	2-0	Gamba Osaka U-23	Yokohama Mitsuzawa Athletic Stadium	1,587
