= 2015 YSCC Yokohama season =

YSCC Yokohama
2015 season
- Manager: Kenji Arima
- Stadium: NHK Spring Mitsuzawa Football Stadium
- J3 League: 13th

2015 YSCC Yokohama season.

== J3 League ==
=== League table ===
Pos	Team	Pld	W	D	L	GF	GA	GD	Pts	Promotion or relegation
8	Blaublitz Akita	36	12	9	15	37	40	−3	45	
9	FC Ryukyu	36	12	9	15	45	51	−6	45	
10	Fujieda MYFC	36	11	4	21	37	61	−24	37	
11	Grulla Morioka	36	8	11	17	36	47	−11	35	
12	J.League U-22 Selection (W)	36	7	7	22	28	71	−43	28	Folded by JFA after the season.
13	YSCC Yokohama	36	7	6	23	24	58	−34	27	

Updated to match(es) played on 23 November 2015. Source: JLeague.jp
Rules for classification: 1) Points; 2) Goal difference; 3) Goals scored; 4th) head-to-head results; 5th) disciplinary points; 6th) draw
(W) Withdrawn

=== Match details ===
J3 League match details
Match	Date	Team	Score	Team	Venue	Attendance
1	2015.03.15	FC Ryukyu	0-1	YSCC Yokohama	Okinawa Athletic Park Stadium	2,646
2	2015.03.21	YSCC Yokohama	0-1	FC Machida Zelvia	NHK Spring Mitsuzawa Football Stadium	1,723
3	2015.03.29	YSCC Yokohama	0-1	Fukushima United FC	NHK Spring Mitsuzawa Football Stadium	803
4	2015.04.05	Blaublitz Akita	0-1	YSCC Yokohama	Akigin Stadium	3,233
5	2015.04.12	YSCC Yokohama	0-2	AC Nagano Parceiro	NHK Spring Mitsuzawa Football Stadium	1,117
6	2015.04.19	Grulla Morioka	2-2	YSCC Yokohama	Morioka Minami Park Stadium	1,105
8	2015.04.29	YSCC Yokohama	0-0	J.League U-22 Selection	NHK Spring Mitsuzawa Football Stadium	1,162
9	2015.05.03	YSCC Yokohama	0-1	Renofa Yamaguchi FC	NHK Spring Mitsuzawa Football Stadium	1,153
10	2015.05.06	Kataller Toyama	2-0	YSCC Yokohama	Toyama Stadium	3,146
11	2015.05.10	YSCC Yokohama	0-1	Fujieda MYFC	Yokohama Mitsuzawa Athletic Stadium	705
12	2015.05.17	Gainare Tottori	1-1	YSCC Yokohama	Tottori Bank Bird Stadium	1,651
13	2015.05.24	YSCC Yokohama	0-4	SC Sagamihara	NHK Spring Mitsuzawa Football Stadium	1,047
14	2015.05.31	YSCC Yokohama	0-1	Fukushima United FC	NHK Spring Mitsuzawa Football Stadium	871
15	2015.06.07	Kataller Toyama	1-1	YSCC Yokohama	Toyama Stadium	2,876
16	2015.06.14	YSCC Yokohama	1-2	Fujieda MYFC	NHK Spring Mitsuzawa Football Stadium	597
17	2015.06.20	Renofa Yamaguchi FC	6-1	YSCC Yokohama	Ishin Memorial Park Stadium	3,722
18	2015.06.28	FC Machida Zelvia	2-1	YSCC Yokohama	Machida Stadium	2,536
19	2015.07.05	YSCC Yokohama	0-1	SC Sagamihara	NHK Spring Mitsuzawa Football Stadium	709
20	2015.07.12	YSCC Yokohama	1-0	Gainare Tottori	NHK Spring Mitsuzawa Football Stadium	635
21	2015.07.19	AC Nagano Parceiro	1-0	YSCC Yokohama	Minami Nagano Sports Park Stadium	5,106
22	2015.07.26	Grulla Morioka	1-1	YSCC Yokohama	Morioka Minami Park Stadium	922
23	2015.07.29	YSCC Yokohama	0-0	Blaublitz Akita	NHK Spring Mitsuzawa Football Stadium	585
24	2015.08.02	FC Ryukyu	2-1	YSCC Yokohama	Okinawa Athletic Park Stadium	1,023
25	2015.08.09	YSCC Yokohama	0-3	J.League U-22 Selection	NHK Spring Mitsuzawa Football Stadium	1,079
27	2015.09.05	YSCC Yokohama	0-2	FC Machida Zelvia	NHK Spring Mitsuzawa Football Stadium	1,631
28	2015.09.13	YSCC Yokohama	4-0	J.League U-22 Selection	NHK Spring Mitsuzawa Football Stadium	678
29	2015.09.19	Blaublitz Akita	1-0	YSCC Yokohama	Akigin Stadium	1,513
30	2015.09.23	YSCC Yokohama	1-0	FC Ryukyu	NHK Spring Mitsuzawa Football Stadium	910
31	2015.09.27	Renofa Yamaguchi FC	4-0	YSCC Yokohama	Ishin Memorial Park Stadium	4,510
32	2015.10.04	Fukushima United FC	3-0	YSCC Yokohama	Toho Stadium	818
34	2015.10.17	YSCC Yokohama	0-1	Grulla Morioka	NHK Spring Mitsuzawa Football Stadium	548
35	2015.10.25	SC Sagamihara	0-2	YSCC Yokohama	Sagamihara Gion Stadium	9,040
36	2015.11.01	YSCC Yokohama	0-2	Kataller Toyama	Yokohama Mitsuzawa Athletic Stadium	1,051
37	2015.11.08	AC Nagano Parceiro	5-1	YSCC Yokohama	Minami Nagano Sports Park Stadium	4,362
38	2015.11.13	YSCC Yokohama	1-3	Gainare Tottori	Shonan BMW Stadium Hiratsuka	461
39	2015.11.23	Fujieda MYFC	2-3	YSCC Yokohama	Fujieda Soccer Stadium	1,484
