= 2017 YSCC Yokohama season =

YSCC Yokohama
2017 season
- Manager: Yasuhiro Higuchi
- Stadium: NHK Spring Mitsuzawa Football Stadium
- J3 League: 14th

2017 YSCC Yokohama season.

== J3 League ==
=== League table ===
| Pos | Team | Pld | W | D | L | GF | GA | GD | Pts |
|---|---|---|---|---|---|---|---|---|---|
| 11 | FC Tokyo U-23 | 32 | 12 | 7 | 13 | 36 | 47 | −11 | 43 |
| 12 | SC Sagamihara | 32 | 9 | 12 | 11 | 34 | 41 | −7 | 39 |
| 13 | Cerezo Osaka U-23 | 32 | 8 | 11 | 13 | 39 | 43 | −4 | 35 |
| 14 | YSCC Yokohama | 32 | 8 | 8 | 16 | 41 | 54 | −13 | 32 |
| 15 | Grulla Morioka | 32 | 7 | 8 | 17 | 32 | 49 | −17 | 29 |
| 16 | Gamba Osaka U-23 | 32 | 7 | 5 | 20 | 31 | 65 | −34 | 26 |
| 17 | Gainare Tottori | 32 | 4 | 9 | 19 | 31 | 63 | −32 | 21 |

Source: 2017 MEIJI YASUDA J3 LEAGUE League table
Rules for classification: 1) Points; 2) Goal difference; 3) Goals scored; 4th) head-to-head results; 5th) disciplinary points; 6th) draw

=== Match details ===
J3 League match details
| Match | Date | Team | Score | Team | Venue | Attendance |
|---|---|---|---|---|---|---|
| 1 | 2017.03.11 | YSCC Yokohama | 0-2 | Fukushima United FC | NHK Spring Mitsuzawa Football Stadium | 1,145 |
| 2 | 2017.03.19 | AC Nagano Parceiro | 3-0 | YSCC Yokohama | Minami Nagano Sports Park Stadium | 6,009 |
| 3 | 2017.03.25 | Tochigi SC | 1-0 | YSCC Yokohama | Tochigi Green Stadium | 2,758 |
| 4 | 2017.04.01 | YSCC Yokohama | 2-2 | Cerezo Osaka U-23 | NHK Spring Mitsuzawa Football Stadium | 559 |
| 6 | 2017.04.30 | Giravanz Kitakyushu | 3-2 | YSCC Yokohama | Mikuni World Stadium Kitakyushu | 6,192 |
| 7 | 2017.05.07 | YSCC Yokohama | 1-2 | Gainare Tottori | NHK Spring Mitsuzawa Football Stadium | 1,198 |
| 8 | 2017.05.14 | Gamba Osaka U-23 | 1-2 | YSCC Yokohama | Suita City Football Stadium | 1,004 |
| 9 | 2017.05.20 | Kataller Toyama | 1-0 | YSCC Yokohama | Toyama Stadium | 2,387 |
| 10 | 2017.05.28 | YSCC Yokohama | 1-4 | Azul Claro Numazu | NHK Spring Mitsuzawa Football Stadium | 1,005 |
| 11 | 2017.06.03 | Grulla Morioka | 0-1 | YSCC Yokohama | Iwagin Stadium | 1,148 |
| 12 | 2017.06.10 | YSCC Yokohama | 0-0 | SC Sagamihara | NHK Spring Mitsuzawa Football Stadium | 1,093 |
| 13 | 2017.06.18 | YSCC Yokohama | 0-1 | FC Tokyo U-23 | NHK Spring Mitsuzawa Football Stadium | 894 |
| 14 | 2017.06.25 | Kagoshima United FC | 1-0 | YSCC Yokohama | Kagoshima Kamoike Stadium | 1,854 |
| 15 | 2017.07.01 | YSCC Yokohama | 2-2 | FC Ryukyu | NHK Spring Mitsuzawa Football Stadium | 662 |
| 16 | 2017.07.09 | Blaublitz Akita | 4-3 | YSCC Yokohama | Akigin Stadium | 2,019 |
| 17 | 2017.07.16 | YSCC Yokohama | 1-1 | Fujieda MYFC | NHK Spring Mitsuzawa Football Stadium | 740 |
| 19 | 2017.08.19 | YSCC Yokohama | 0-2 | Tochigi SC | NHK Spring Mitsuzawa Football Stadium | 1,264 |
| 20 | 2017.08.26 | FC Tokyo U-23 | 0-3 | YSCC Yokohama | Ajinomoto Field Nishigaoka | 868 |
| 21 | 2017.09.02 | YSCC Yokohama | 1-1 | Kataller Toyama | NHK Spring Mitsuzawa Football Stadium | 1,043 |
| 22 | 2017.09.10 | Gainare Tottori | 1-2 | YSCC Yokohama | Chubu Yajin Stadium | 1,569 |
| 23 | 2017.09.17 | YSCC Yokohama | 2-1 | Blaublitz Akita | NHK Spring Mitsuzawa Football Stadium | 612 |
| 24 | 2017.09.24 | SC Sagamihara | 1-2 | YSCC Yokohama | Sagamihara Gion Stadium | 2,920 |
| 25 | 2017.10.01 | Azul Claro Numazu | 1-1 | YSCC Yokohama | Ashitaka Park Stadium | 4,293 |
| 26 | 2017.10.08 | YSCC Yokohama | 2-1 | Giravanz Kitakyushu | NHK Spring Mitsuzawa Football Stadium | 1,152 |
| 27 | 2017.10.14 | YSCC Yokohama | 1-3 | AC Nagano Parceiro | NHK Spring Mitsuzawa Football Stadium | 706 |
| 28 | 2017.10.22 | Cerezo Osaka U-23 | 2-2 | YSCC Yokohama | Kincho Stadium | 273 |
| 29 | 2017.10.28 | YSCC Yokohama | 4-1 | Kagoshima United FC | NHK Spring Mitsuzawa Football Stadium | 687 |
| 30 | 2017.11.05 | FC Ryukyu | 2-1 | YSCC Yokohama | Okinawa Athletic Park Stadium | 1,032 |
| 31 | 2017.11.11 | YSCC Yokohama | 3-4 | Gamba Osaka U-23 | NHK Spring Mitsuzawa Football Stadium | 1,232 |
| 32 | 2017.11.19 | YSCC Yokohama | 1-2 | Grulla Morioka | Yokohama Mitsuzawa Athletic Stadium | 1,230 |
| 33 | 2017.11.26 | Fukushima United FC | 3-0 | YSCC Yokohama | Toho Stadium | 1,203 |
| 34 | 2017.12.03 | Fujieda MYFC | 1-1 | YSCC Yokohama | Fujieda Soccer Stadium | 1,683 |
