= 2018 YSCC Yokohama season =

YSCC Yokohama
2018 season
- Manager: Yasuhiro Higuchi
- Stadium: NHK Spring Mitsuzawa Football Stadium
- J3 League: 15th

2018 YSCC Yokohama season.

== J3 League ==
Match	Date	Team	Score	Team	Venue	Attendance
1	2018.03.09	YSCC Yokohama	2-2	SC Sagamihara	NHK Spring Mitsuzawa Football Stadium	1,141
2	2018.03.16	YSCC Yokohama	3-1	FC Tokyo U-23	NHK Spring Mitsuzawa Football Stadium	671
3	2018.03.21	Grulla Morioka	3-2	YSCC Yokohama	Iwagin Stadium	1,606
4	2018.03.25	YSCC Yokohama	0-0	Gamba Osaka U-23	NHK Spring Mitsuzawa Football Stadium	1,509
5	2018.04.01	Blaublitz Akita	2-0	YSCC Yokohama	Akigin Stadium	1,971
6	2018.04.07	YSCC Yokohama	3-0	Fukushima United FC	NHK Spring Mitsuzawa Football Stadium	830
7	2018.04.15	Gainare Tottori	1-4	YSCC Yokohama	Tottori Bank Bird Stadium	1,703
8	2018.04.29	YSCC Yokohama	3-2	FC Ryukyu	NHK Spring Mitsuzawa Football Stadium	1,285
10	2018.05.06	Fujieda MYFC	2-1	YSCC Yokohama	Fujieda Soccer Stadium	1,256
11	2018.05.19	YSCC Yokohama	1-1	Cerezo Osaka U-23	NHK Spring Mitsuzawa Football Stadium	728
12	2018.06.01	YSCC Yokohama	0-0	Thespakusatsu Gunma	NHK Spring Mitsuzawa Football Stadium	1,228
13	2018.06.09	Kataller Toyama	2-2	YSCC Yokohama	Toyama Stadium	2,694
14	2018.06.16	Giravanz Kitakyushu	2-3	YSCC Yokohama	Mikuni World Stadium Kitakyushu	4,886
15	2018.06.23	YSCC Yokohama	0-1	AC Nagano Parceiro	NHK Spring Mitsuzawa Football Stadium	887
16	2018.07.01	Kagoshima United FC	1-1	YSCC Yokohama	Shiranami Stadium	4,030
17	2018.07.07	Azul Claro Numazu	1-0	YSCC Yokohama	Ashitaka Park Stadium	1,271
18	2018.07.15	YSCC Yokohama	0-0	Giravanz Kitakyushu	NHK Spring Mitsuzawa Football Stadium	1,231
19	2018.07.21	FC Ryukyu	1-1	YSCC Yokohama	Okinawa Athletic Park Stadium	1,289
20	2018.08.26	Gamba Osaka U-23	3-0	YSCC Yokohama	Panasonic Stadium Suita	568
21	2018.09.02	YSCC Yokohama	0-4	Kagoshima United FC	NHK Spring Mitsuzawa Football Stadium	1,122
22	2018.09.08	YSCC Yokohama	2-2	Azul Claro Numazu	NHK Spring Mitsuzawa Football Stadium	874
24	2018.09.23	Fukushima United FC	0-1	YSCC Yokohama	Shonan BMW Stadium Hiratsuka	1,203
25	2018.09.29	YSCC Yokohama	1-2	Kataller Toyama	Shonan BMW Stadium Hiratsuka	546
26	2018.10.07	Cerezo Osaka U-23	2-0	YSCC Yokohama	Yanmar Stadium Nagai	620
27	2018.10.14	AC Nagano Parceiro	0-1	YSCC Yokohama	Nagano U Stadium	2,679
28	2018.10.20	YSCC Yokohama	1-3	Fujieda MYFC	NHK Spring Mitsuzawa Football Stadium	656
29	2018.10.28	YSCC Yokohama	3-1	Blaublitz Akita	NHK Spring Mitsuzawa Football Stadium	1,147
30	2018.11.04	SC Sagamihara	1-0	YSCC Yokohama	Sagamihara Gion Stadium	2,542
31	2018.11.11	YSCC Yokohama	2-3	Grulla Morioka	Yokohama Mitsuzawa Athletic Stadium	805
32	2018.11.18	FC Tokyo U-23	1-0	YSCC Yokohama	Yumenoshima Stadium	1,925
33	2018.11.24	YSCC Yokohama	1-2	Gainare Tottori	NHK Spring Mitsuzawa Football Stadium	1,417
34	2018.12.02	Thespakusatsu Gunma	2-2	YSCC Yokohama	Shoda Shoyu Stadium Gunma	4,503
