= 2014 YSCC Yokohama season =

YSCC Yokohama
2014 season
- Manager: Kenji Arima
- Stadium: NHK Spring Mitsuzawa Football Stadium
- J3 League: 12th

2014 YSCC Yokohama season.

== J3 League ==
Match	Date	Team	Score	Team	Venue	Attendance
1	2014.03.09	YSCC Yokohama	1-1	Blaublitz Akita	NHK Spring Mitsuzawa Football Stadium	1,477
2	2014.03.16	SC Sagamihara	2-0	YSCC Yokohama	Sagamihara Gion Stadium	2,183
3	2014.03.23	YSCC Yokohama	1-1	FC Machida Zelvia	NHK Spring Mitsuzawa Football Stadium	1,819
4	2014.03.29	Zweigen Kanazawa	4-0	YSCC Yokohama	Technoport Fukui Stadium	658
5	2014.04.06	YSCC Yokohama	0-2	J.League U-22 Selection	NHK Spring Mitsuzawa Football Stadium	897
6	2014.04.13	AC Nagano Parceiro	0-0	YSCC Yokohama	Saku Athletic Stadium	2,235
7	2014.04.20	YSCC Yokohama	0-1	Fukushima United FC	NHK Spring Mitsuzawa Football Stadium	998
8	2014.04.26	Fujieda MYFC	1-2	YSCC Yokohama	Fujieda Soccer Stadium	680
9	2014.04.29	YSCC Yokohama	1-4	FC Ryukyu	NHK Spring Mitsuzawa Football Stadium	848
10	2014.05.04	YSCC Yokohama	0-2	Gainare Tottori	NHK Spring Mitsuzawa Football Stadium	1,247
11	2014.05.10	Grulla Morioka	3-0	YSCC Yokohama	Morioka Minami Park Stadium	1,201
12	2014.05.18	YSCC Yokohama	2-3	SC Sagamihara	NHK Spring Mitsuzawa Football Stadium	1,254
13	2014.05.25	Fujieda MYFC	2-1	YSCC Yokohama	Fujieda Soccer Stadium	887
14	2014.06.01	YSCC Yokohama	0-1	FC Machida Zelvia	NHK Spring Mitsuzawa Football Stadium	1,741
15	2014.06.08	Gainare Tottori	0-0	YSCC Yokohama	Tottori Bank Bird Stadium	2,396
16	2014.06.15	Blaublitz Akita	3-4	YSCC Yokohama	Akita Yabase Playing Field	1,057
17	2014.06.25	YSCC Yokohama	0-0	Fukushima United FC	NHK Spring Mitsuzawa Football Stadium	737
18	2014.07.20	YSCC Yokohama	0-3	Zweigen Kanazawa	NHK Spring Mitsuzawa Football Stadium	842
19	2014.07.27	Grulla Morioka	1-1	YSCC Yokohama	Morioka Minami Park Stadium	1,055
20	2014.08.02	YSCC Yokohama	1-1	AC Nagano Parceiro	Yokohama Mitsuzawa Athletic Stadium	903
21	2014.08.10	FC Ryukyu	1-1	YSCC Yokohama	Okinawa City Stadium	1,318
22	2014.08.24	YSCC Yokohama	2-1	J.League U-22 Selection	NHK Spring Mitsuzawa Football Stadium	815
23	2014.08.30	YSCC Yokohama	2-4	SC Sagamihara	NHK Spring Mitsuzawa Football Stadium	1,037
24	2014.09.05	YSCC Yokohama	0-0	Grulla Morioka	Yokohama Mitsuzawa Athletic Stadium	512
25	2014.09.13	Fukushima United FC	2-2	YSCC Yokohama	Toho Stadium	751
27	2014.10.04	Zweigen Kanazawa	2-1	YSCC Yokohama	Ishikawa Athletics Stadium	4,665
28	2014.10.11	Blaublitz Akita	2-1	YSCC Yokohama	Akigin Stadium	1,919
29	2014.10.18	YSCC Yokohama	0-0	FC Ryukyu	NHK Spring Mitsuzawa Football Stadium	638
26	2014.10.26	YSCC Yokohama	1-1	J.League U-22 Selection	Shonan BMW Stadium Hiratsuka	577
30	2014.11.02	FC Machida Zelvia	2-1	YSCC Yokohama	Machida Stadium	3,018
31	2014.11.09	YSCC Yokohama	1-2	Gainare Tottori	Yokohama Mitsuzawa Athletic Stadium	842
32	2014.11.16	YSCC Yokohama	2-0	Fujieda MYFC	Yokohama Mitsuzawa Athletic Stadium	1,139
33	2014.11.23	AC Nagano Parceiro	6-1	YSCC Yokohama	Nagano Athletic Stadium	6,619
