= 2015 Grulla Morioka season =

Grulla Morioka
2015 season
- Manager: Naoki Naruo
- Stadium: Morioka Minami Park Stadium
- J3 League: 11th of 13
- Highest home attendance: 3,025
- Lowest home attendance: 635
- Average home league attendance: 1,239
| Home colours | Away colours |

2015 Grulla Morioka season.

== J3 League ==
=== League table ===
| Pos | Team | Pld | W | D | L | GF | GA | GD | Pts | Promotion or relegation |
|---|---|---|---|---|---|---|---|---|---|---|
| 9 | FC Ryukyu | 36 | 12 | 9 | 15 | 45 | 51 | −6 | 45 | |
| 10 | Fujieda MYFC | 36 | 11 | 4 | 21 | 37 | 61 | −24 | 37 | |
| 11 | Grulla Morioka | 36 | 8 | 11 | 17 | 36 | 47 | −11 | 35 | |
| 12 | J.League U-22 Selection (W) | 36 | 7 | 7 | 22 | 28 | 71 | −43 | 28 | Folded by JFA after the season. |
| 13 | YSCC Yokohama | 36 | 7 | 6 | 23 | 24 | 58 | −34 | 27 | |

Updated to match(es) played on 23 November 2015. Source: JLeague.jp
Rules for classification: 1) Points; 2) Goal difference; 3) Goals scored; 4th) head-to-head results; 5th) disciplinary points; 6th) draw
(W) Withdrawn

=== Match details ===
J3 League match details
| Match | Date | Team | Score | Team | Venue | Attendance |
|---|---|---|---|---|---|---|
| 2 | 2015.03.22 | Fukushima United FC | 1-0 | Grulla Morioka | Toho Stadium | 1,150 |
| 3 | 2015.03.29 | Grulla Morioka | 0-0 | Kataller Toyama | Morioka Minami Park Stadium | 1,938 |
| 4 | 2015.04.05 | SC Sagamihara | 1-1 | Grulla Morioka | Sagamihara Gion Stadium | 1,660 |
| 5 | 2015.04.12 | Grulla Morioka | 1-2 | J.League U-22 Selection | Morioka Minami Park Stadium | 1,417 |
| 6 | 2015.04.19 | Grulla Morioka | 2-2 | YSCC Yokohama | Morioka Minami Park Stadium | 1,105 |
| 7 | 2015.04.26 | FC Ryukyu | 3-1 | Grulla Morioka | Okinawa Athletic Park Stadium | 856 |
| 8 | 2015.04.29 | Grulla Morioka | 0-0 | FC Machida Zelvia | Morioka Minami Park Stadium | 1,277 |
| 9 | 2015.05.03 | Blaublitz Akita | 1-0 | Grulla Morioka | Akigin Stadium | 2,023 |
| 10 | 2015.05.06 | Grulla Morioka | 0-1 | Gainare Tottori | Morioka Minami Park Stadium | 1,272 |
| 11 | 2015.05.10 | Grulla Morioka | 0-2 | AC Nagano Parceiro | Morioka Minami Park Stadium | 1,329 |
| 12 | 2015.05.17 | Renofa Yamaguchi FC | 4-0 | Grulla Morioka | Ishin Memorial Park Stadium | 4,021 |
| 13 | 2015.05.24 | Grulla Morioka | 2-0 | Fujieda MYFC | Morioka Minami Park Stadium | 1,130 |
| 14 | 2015.05.31 | Grulla Morioka | 2-1 | FC Ryukyu | Morioka Minami Park Stadium | 1,004 |
| 15 | 2015.06.07 | Fukushima United FC | 1-1 | Grulla Morioka | Toho Stadium | 1,599 |
| 16 | 2015.06.14 | Grulla Morioka | 2-3 | SC Sagamihara | Morioka Minami Park Stadium | 3,025 |
| 17 | 2015.06.21 | AC Nagano Parceiro | 0-1 | Grulla Morioka | Minami Nagano Sports Park Stadium | 4,882 |
| 19 | 2015.07.05 | Grulla Morioka | 5-0 | J.League U-22 Selection | Morioka Minami Park Stadium | 1,053 |
| 20 | 2015.07.12 | Grulla Morioka | 0-2 | Fujieda MYFC | Morioka Minami Park Stadium | 1,115 |
| 21 | 2015.07.19 | Gainare Tottori | 2-1 | Grulla Morioka | Tottori Bank Bird Stadium | 3,295 |
| 22 | 2015.07.26 | Grulla Morioka | 1-1 | YSCC Yokohama | Morioka Minami Park Stadium | 922 |
| 23 | 2015.07.29 | FC Machida Zelvia | 0-1 | Grulla Morioka | Machida Stadium | 2,005 |
| 24 | 2015.08.02 | Grulla Morioka | 0-1 | Renofa Yamaguchi FC | Morioka Minami Park Stadium | 855 |
| 25 | 2015.08.09 | Kataller Toyama | 1-0 | Grulla Morioka | Toyama Stadium | 2,542 |
| 26 | 2015.08.16 | Grulla Morioka | 0-0 | Blaublitz Akita | Morioka Minami Park Stadium | 1,170 |
| 27 | 2015.09.06 | SC Sagamihara | 2-2 | Grulla Morioka | Sagamihara Gion Stadium | 1,882 |
| 28 | 2015.09.13 | Grulla Morioka | 1-1 | FC Machida Zelvia | Morioka Minami Park Stadium | 811 |
| 29 | 2015.09.20 | FC Ryukyu | 1-1 | Grulla Morioka | Okinawa Athletic Park Stadium | 736 |
| 30 | 2015.09.23 | Grulla Morioka | 0-1 | Blaublitz Akita | Morioka Minami Park Stadium | 1,127 |
| 31 | 2015.09.27 | AC Nagano Parceiro | 2-2 | Grulla Morioka | Minami Nagano Sports Park Stadium | 3,628 |
| 32 | 2015.10.04 | Grulla Morioka | 1-0 | J.League U-22 Selection | Morioka Minami Park Stadium | 944 |
| 33 | 2015.10.11 | Fujieda MYFC | 2-1 | Grulla Morioka | Fujieda Soccer Stadium | 964 |
| 34 | 2015.10.17 | YSCC Yokohama | 0-1 | Grulla Morioka | NHK Spring Mitsuzawa Football Stadium | 548 |
| 36 | 2015.10.31 | Grulla Morioka | 1-2 | Gainare Tottori | Morioka Minami Park Stadium | 890 |
| 37 | 2015.11.08 | Grulla Morioka | 1-4 | Renofa Yamaguchi FC | Morioka Minami Park Stadium | 635 |
| 38 | 2015.11.15 | Kataller Toyama | 2-1 | Grulla Morioka | Toyama Stadium | 2,780 |
| 39 | 2015.11.23 | Grulla Morioka | 3-1 | Fukushima United FC | Morioka Minami Park Stadium | 1,765 |
