= Carlos Arroyo (disambiguation) =

Carlos Arroyo (born 1979) is a Puerto Rican professional basketball player.

Carlos Arroyo may also refer to:

- Carlos Arroyo (architect) (born 1964), Spanish architect
- Carlos Alberto Arroyo del Río (1893–1969), president of Ecuador, 1940–1944
- Carlos Arroyo (footballer, born 2001), Ecuadorian footballer
- Carlos Arroyo (footballer, born 1966), Spanish footballer
