= Sagawa =

Sagawa is a Japanese family name (surname). It may refer to:

== People with the surname ==
- Esther Sagawa (born 1994), Malawian local politician
- Hajime Sagawa, Japanese securities broker involved in the "Olympus scandal" in 2011–12
- Issei Sagawa (1949–2022), Japanese man who in 1981 murdered and cannibalized Renée Hartevelt
- Keisuke Sagawa (1937–2017), Japanese actor and television personality
- Masato Sagawa (born 1943), Japanese scientist and entrepreneur
- Ryosuke Sagawa (born 1993), Japanese footballer
- Tetsurō Sagawa (born 1937), Japanese actor and voice actor from Tateyama, Chiba

== Transport ==
- Sagawa Express, major transportation company in Japan

== Soccer ==
- Sagawa Express Osaka S.C., Soccer Club owned by Sagawa Express
- Sagawa Express Tokyo S.C., industrial-league football team based on Kōtō district of Tokyo
- Sagawa Printing S.C., football (soccer) club based in Muko, Kyoto, Japan
- Sagawa Shiga F.C., amateur Japanese football club
