= Carlos Arroyo (footballer, born 2001) =

Ecuadorian footballer (born 2001)

Personal information
- Full name: Carlos Vidal Arroyo Molina
- Date of birth: 10 February 2001 (age 25)
- Place of birth: Guayaquil, Ecuador
- Height: 1.85 m (6 ft 1 in)
- Position: Centre-forward

Team information
- Current team: Carabobo
- Number: 28

Senior career*
Years	Team	Apps	(Gls)
2018–2021	Santa Fe		
2020	→ Gloria (loan)		
2022	Universidad de San Martín	26	(4)
2023	YSCC Yokohama	15	(0)
2024–	Carabobo	5	(0)
- * Club domestic league appearances and goals as of 20:09, 10 May 2023 (UTC)

Carlos Vidal Arroyo Molina (born 10 February 2001) is an Ecuadorian professional footballer who plays as a centre-forward for Carabobo.

== Career ==
On 29 March 2023, it was announced that Arroyo would join YSCC Yokohama of the J3 League. On 2 April, in a J3 League match against AC Nagano Parceiro, he appeared as a substitute in place of Koki Matsumura, marking his first appearance in the J.League.

On 17 February 2024, Arroyo signed with the Venezuelan club Carabobo.
