= Yuge =

Yuge is a variant pronunciation of huge with reduction of /hj/.

Yuge may also refer to:

== People ==
=== Surname ===
- Prince Yuge (died 699), Japanese prince
- Hayato Yuge (born 1994) Japanese professional baseball pitcher
- Tomohisa Yuge (born 1980), Japanese actor
- Tsubasa Yuge (born 2000) Japanese footballer

=== Given name ===
- Zhang Yuge (born 1996), Chinese singer

== Places ==
- Yuge, Ehime, town in Ehime Prefecture, Japan
- Yuge-dera, archaeological site with the ruins of a Nara period Buddhist temple
- Yuge National College of Maritime Technology, national colleges of Maritime Technology in Japan
- Yuge Station, Okayama Prefecture, Japan
- Yuge Yugeen Bharat, under-construction museum in New Delhi, India

== Other uses ==
- "Yuge", a song by Gen Hoshino from the single "Kudaranai no Naka ni" (2011)
- Yuge! 30 Years of Doonesbury on Trump, an anthology of Doonesbury cartoons (2016)

== See also ==
- Huge (disambiguation)
