= Shunta Nishiyama =

Japanese footballer

Shunta Nishiyama 西山 峻太
Personal information
- Full name: Shunta Nishiyama
- Date of birth: 25 July 1989 (age 37)
- Place of birth: Kanagawa, Japan
- Height: 1.66 m (5 ft 5 1/2 in)
- Position: Defender

Team information
- Current team: YSCC Yokohama
- Number: 25

Youth career
- Meiji Freebirds
- FC La Stella
- 2005–2007: Muroran Otani High School

College career
Years	Team	Apps	(Gls)
2008–2011	Kokushikan University		

Senior career*
Years	Team	Apps	(Gls)
2012–	YSCC Yokohama	260	(11)
- * Club domestic league appearances and goals as of 17 February 2025, 20:20 (UTC)

Shunta Nishiyama (西山 峻太, Nishiyama Shunta; born July 25, 1989 in Kanagawa) is a Japanese football player and captain for Japan Football League club, YSCC Yokohama.

== Career ==
Nishiyama played football in the school team of Muroran Otani High School and the university football team of Kokushikan University. He signed his first contract with YSCC Yokohama in 2012. The club played in the country's third-highest league, the Japan Football League. At the end of the 2013 season, the club was promoted to the J3 League.

== Career statistics ==
=== Club ===
As of the start for 2025 season.

Club performance			League		Cup		League Cup		Total	
Season	Club	League	Apps	Goals	Apps	Goals	Apps	Goals	Apps	Goals
Japan			League		Emperor's Cup		J.League Cup		Total	
2012	YSCC Yokohama	JFL	27	0	2	0	–		29	0
2013	YSCC Yokohama	JFL	34	2	–		–		34	2
2014	YSCC Yokohama	J3 League	15	0	0	0	–		15	0
2015	YSCC Yokohama	J3 League	7	0	–		–		7	0
2016	YSCC Yokohama	J3 League	24	1	–		–		24	1
2017	YSCC Yokohama	J3 League	29	4	1	0	–		30	4
2018	YSCC Yokohama	J3 League	31	2	2	0	–		33	2
2019	YSCC Yokohama	J3 League	27	1	–		–		27	1
2020	YSCC Yokohama	J3 League	27	1	–		–		30	4
2021	YSCC Yokohama	J3 League	14	0	1	0	–		15	0
2022	YSCC Yokohama	J3 League	8	0	–		–		24	1
2023	YSCC Yokohama	J3 League	1	0	–		–		1	0
2024	YSCC Yokohama	J3 League	16	0	–		1	0	17	0
2025	YSCC Yokohama	JFL	0	0	0	0	–		0	0
Career total			260	11	6	0	1	0	267	11
