= Atsushi Kikutani =

Japanese footballer

Personal information
- Date of birth: 18 June 1997 (age 29)
- Place of birth: Chiba, Japan
- Height: 1.69 m (5 ft 7 in)
- Position: Midfielder

Team information
- Current team: YSCC Yokohama
- Number: 7

Youth career
- –2010: Vivaio Funabashi
- 2011–2013: Seiwa Gakuen High School

College career
Years	Team	Apps	(Gls)
2014–2017	Edogawa University		

Senior career*
Years	Team	Apps	(Gls)
2017–2018	TSG 1846 Bretzenheim		
2018–2019	Pfeddersheim	23	(7)
2019–2020	Bayern Alzenau	14	(0)
2021–	YSCC Yokohama	49	(4)
- * Club domestic league appearances and goals as of 21:11, 2 March 2023 (UTC)

Atsushi Kikutani (菊谷 篤資, Kikutani Atsushi; born 18 June 1997) is a Japanese footballer who plays as a midfielder for YSCC Yokohama.

== Career statistics ==
As of 4 April 2021

Club	Season	League			National Cup		League Cup		Other		Total	
Club	Season	Division	Apps	Goals	Apps	Goals	Apps	Goals	Apps	Goals	Apps	Goals
TSG 1846 Bretzenheim	2017–18	Landesliga Ost	22	19	0	0	–		0	0	22	19
Pfeddersheim	2018–19	Oberliga RPS	23	7	0	0	–		5 (Note: Three appearances and one goal in the Southwestern Cup, two games and one goal in the Eichbaum-Cup Pfeddersheim)	2	28	9
Bayern Alzenau	2019–20	Regionalliga Südwest	14	0	0	0	–		1 (Note: Appearances in the Hessian Cup)	0	15	0
YSCC Yokohama	2021	J3 League	1	0	0	0	–		0	0	1	0
Career total			60	26	0	0	0	0	6	2	66	28
