= Jorn Pedersen =

Japanese footballer (born 1997)

Jorn Pedersen ピーダーセン 世穏
Personal information
- Date of birth: 12 December 1997 (age 28)
- Place of birth: Tokyo, Japan
- Height: 1.82 m (6 ft 0 in)
- Position: Forward

Team information
- Current team: Vanraure Hachinohe

Youth career
- 18: Footboze Football
- –2015: FC Toripletta

College career
Years	Team	Apps	(Gls)
2016–2019	Keio University		

Senior career*
Years	Team	Apps	(Gls)
2020–2024	YSCC Yokohama	91	(8)
2025–	Vanraure Hachinohe	5	(0)
- * Club domestic league appearances and goals as of 1 January 2026

Jorn Pedersen (ピーダーセン 世穏, Pīdāsen Yorun; born 12 December 1997) is a Japanese footballer who playing as a forward and currently play for Vanraure Hachinohe.

== Career ==
Pedersen attended Keio from elementary school to university.

On 21 January 2020, Pedersen joined the J3 club YSCC Yokohama. He left from the club at the end of 2024 season after his club secure relegation to JFL from 2025.

On 23 December 2024, Pedersen announce official transfer to fellow J3 club, Vanraure Hachinohe from 2025 season.

== Personal life ==
Born in Japan, Pedersen is of Japanese descent to a Danish father and a Japanese mother.

== Career statistics ==
=== Club ===
As of the start from 2025 season.

Club	Season	League			National Cup		League Cup		Other		Total	
Club	Season	Division	Apps	Goals	Apps	Goals	Apps	Goals	Apps	Goals	Apps	Goals
YSCC Yokohama	2020	J3 League	27	3	0	0	–		0	0	27	3
YSCC Yokohama	2021	J3 League	10	2	0	0	–		0	0	10	2
YSCC Yokohama	2022	J3 League	3	0	0	0	–		0	0	3	0
YSCC Yokohama	2023	J3 League	22	1	0	0	–		0	0	22	1
YSCC Yokohama	2024	J3 League	29	2	0	0	2	0	2 (Note: Includes J3/JFL Play-offs)	0	33	2
Vanraure Hachinohe	2025	J3 League	0	0	0	0	0	0	0	0	0	0
Career total			91	8	0	0	2	0	2	0	95	8
