= Shuna Matsumoto =

Japanese football coach (born 1985)

Shuna Matsumoto (松本 珠奈, Matsumoto Shuna, born July 27, 1985) is a Japanese association football coach. As of 2022, she worked as an athletic performance coach for YSCC Yokohama. She is a trans woman.

Matsumoto was born a male in Bremen, Germany to Japanese parents on 27 July 1985. She grew up there and attended a Steiner school. She trained to be a coach in Germany and the United States, and moved to Japan in 2013 to pursue a coaching career. She trained Keisuke Ushiro and has been a coach for YSCC Yokohama since 2020.

Matsumoto came out as a transgender woman in 2021, having previously experienced gender dysphoria but ignoring it in favour of her career. She changed her name from "Shun" to "Shuna". She received positive reactions upon coming out, and her Twitter followers increased by five times.
