= Ryohei Wakizaka =

Japanese footballer

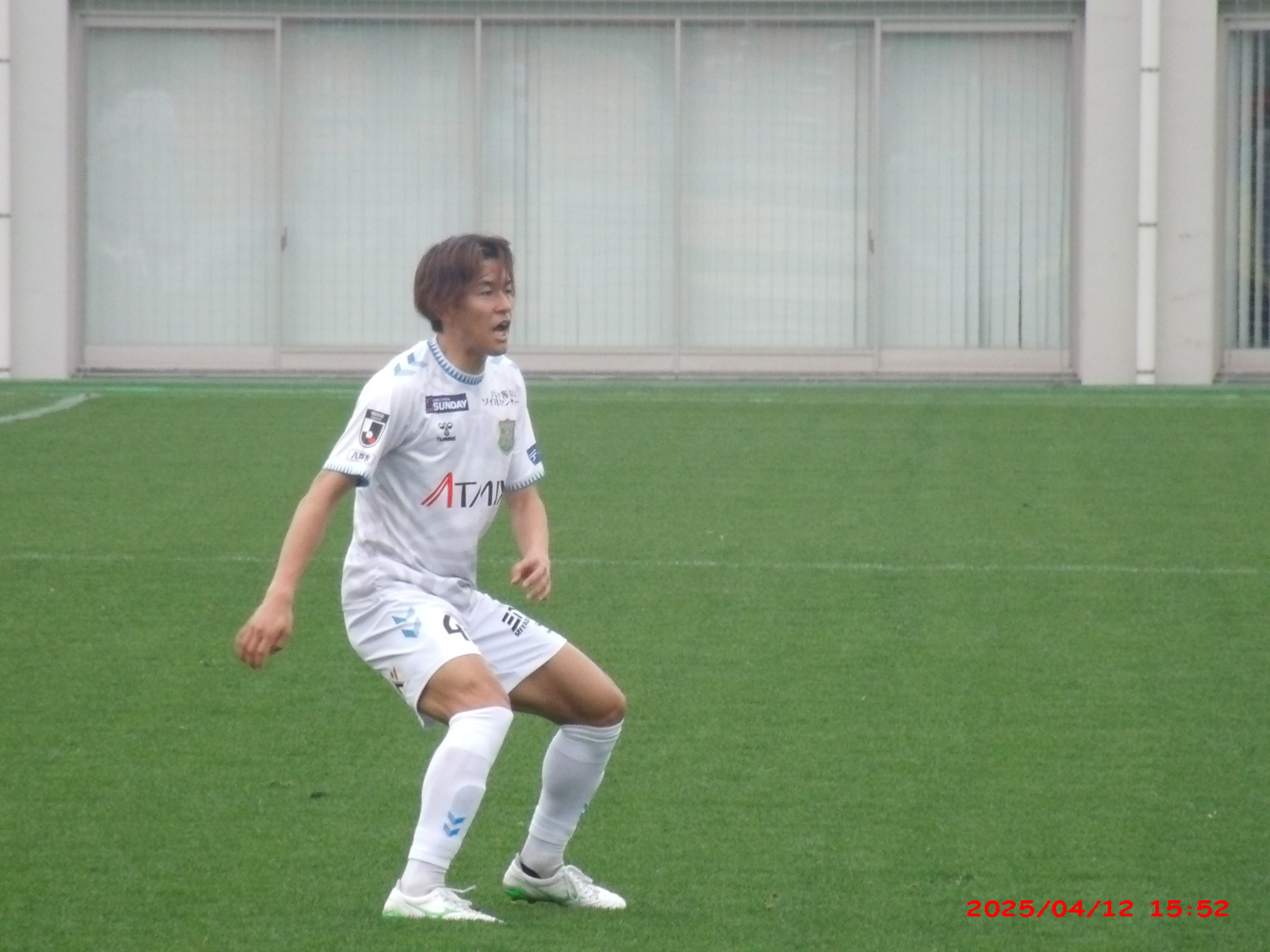

Personal information
- Date of birth: 27 December 1998 (age 27)
- Place of birth: Yokohama, Kanagawa, Japan
- Height: 1.72 m (5 ft 8 in)
- Position: Midfielder

Youth career
- FC Hongo
- –2013: Esperanza SC
- 2014–2016: Shonan Institute of Technology High School

College career
| Years | Team | Apps | (Gls) |
| 2017–2020 | Niigata University of Health and Welfare | | |

Senior career*
| Years | Team | Apps | (Gls) |
| 2022–2025 | YSCC Yokohama | 42 | (3) |
| 2025–2026 | Vanraure Hachinohe | 21 | (1) |
- * Club domestic league appearances and goals as of 31 May 2026

Ryohei Wakizaka (脇坂 崚平, Wakizaka Ryohei; born 27 December 1998) is a Japanese footballer currently playing as a midfielder for YSCC Yokohama.

== Personal life ==
Wakizaka is the brother of Japanese international footballer Yasuto Wakizaka.

== Career statistics ==
=== Club ===
As of 12 March 2022.

| Club | Season | League | | | National Cup | | League Cup | | Other | | Total | |
| Club | Season | Division | Apps | Goals | Apps | Goals | Apps | Goals | Apps | Goals | Apps | Goals |
|---|---|---|---|---|---|---|---|---|---|---|---|---|
| YSCC Yokohama | 2022 | J3 League | 1 | 0 | 0 | 0 | – | | 0 | 0 | 1 | 0 |
| Career total | | | 1 | 0 | 0 | 0 | 0 | 0 | 0 | 0 | 1 | 0 |
