= Kei Hoshikawa =

Japanese football manager (born 1976)

Kei Hoshikawa 星川 敬
Personal information
- Date of birth: 29 May 1976 (age 50)
- Place of birth: Tokyo Prefecture, Japan
- Height: 1.77 m (5 ft 10 in)
- Position: Forward

Team information
- Current team: Iwate Grulla Morioka (manager)

Youth career
- 1992–1994: Verdy Kawasaki

Senior career*
| Years | Team | Apps | (Gls) |
| 1995–1996 | Verdy Kawasaki | 0 | (0) |

Managerial career
- 2009–2010: Nippon TV Tokyo Verdy Beleza
- 2010–2012: INAC Kobe Leonessa
- 2014: Concordia Elbląg
- 2018–2020: FK Auda
- 2021–2022: INAC Kobe Leonessa
- 2022–2023: YSCC Yokohama
- 2024–: Iwate Grulla Morioka
- * Club domestic league appearances and goals

Kei Hoshikawa (星川 敬, Hoshikawa Kei; born 29 May 1976) is a Japanese football manager and former player who is the manager of Japan Football League club Iwate Grulla Morioka.
