= Onye Ogochukwu =

Nigerian footballer

Personal information
- Full name: Promise Onye Ogochukwu
- Date of birth: 13 March 2002 (age 24)
- Height: 1.70 m (5 ft 7 in)
- Position: Forward

Team information
- Current team: YSCC Yokohama
- Number: 67

Youth career
- Dynamo Sports Foundation
- 2017–2019: Kochi Chuo High School

Senior career*
Years	Team	Apps	(Gls)
2020–	YSCC Yokohama	48	(5)
- * Club domestic league appearances and goals as of 11:00, 30 May 2024 (UTC)

Promise Onye Ogochukwu (born 13 March 2002) is a Nigerian professional footballer who plays as a forward for YSCC Yokohama of J3 League.

== Career statistics ==
=== Club ===
As of 16 June 2021.

Club	Season	League			National Cup		League Cup		Other		Total	
Club	Season	Division	Apps	Goals	Apps	Goals	Apps	Goals	Apps	Goals	Apps	Goals
YSCC Yokohama	2020	J3 League	23	2	0	0	–		0	0	23	2
YSCC Yokohama	2021	J3 League	1	0	1 (Note: Appearances in the Emperor's Cup)	1	–		0	0	2	1
Career total			24	2	1	1	0	0	0	0	25	3
