= Yutaro Yanagi =

Japanese footballer (born 1995)

Yutaro Yanagi 柳 雄太郎
Personal information
- Full name: Yutaro Yanagi
- Date of birth: June 26, 1995 (age 31)
- Place of birth: Niigata, Japan
- Height: 1.74 m (5 ft 8 1/2 in)
- Position: Midfielder

Team information
- Current team: Kamatamare Sanuki
- Number: 27

Youth career
- Kibogaoka SC SSS
- –2010: Nagaoka Billboard FC
- 2011–2013: Teikyo Nagaoka High School

College career
Years	Team	Apps	(Gls)
2014–2017	Meikai University		

Senior career*
Years	Team	Apps	(Gls)
2018–2024	YSCC Yokohama	164	(11)
2025–	Kamatamare Sanuki	1	(0)
- * Club domestic league appearances and goals as of 1 January 2026

Yutaro Yanagi (柳 雄太郎, Yanagi Yutaro; born June 26, 1995 in Kanagawa) is a Japanese football player who currently plays for Kamatamare Sanuki.

== Career ==
After attending Meikai University, Yanagi signed for YSCC Yokohama in December 2017. He then debuted in J3 League in a game against Gainare Tottori, coming in at the 92nd minute.

== Club statistics ==
Updated to 23 August 2018.

Club performance			League		Cup		Total	
Season	Club	League	Apps	Goals	Apps	Goals	Apps	Goals
Japan			League		Emperor's Cup		Total	
2018	YSCC Yokohama	J3 League	3	0	0	0	3	0
Career total			3	0	0	0	3	0
