= Ryosuke Sagawa =

Japanese footballer

Personal information
- Date of birth: 17 July 1993 (age 33)
- Place of birth: Tokyo, Japan
- Height: 1.86 m (6 ft 1 in)
- Position: Goalkeeper

Team information
- Current team: YSCC Yokohama
- Number: 16

Youth career
- –2005: Shimo FC
- 2006–2008: Ohara Junior High School
- 2009–2011: Saitama Sakae High School

College career
Years	Team	Apps	(Gls)
2012–2015	Takushoku University		

Senior career*
Years	Team	Apps	(Gls)
2016–	YSCC Yokohama	20	(0)
- * Club domestic league appearances and goals as of 17:04, 13 November 2020 (UTC)

Ryosuke Sagawa (佐川 亮介, Sagawa Ryosuke; born 17 July 1993) is a Japanese footballer currently playing as a goalkeeper for YSCC Yokohama.

== Career statistics ==
=== Club ===
As of 13 November 2020.

Club	Season	League			National Cup		League Cup		Other		Total	
Club	Season	Division	Apps	Goals	Apps	Goals	Apps	Goals	Apps	Goals	Apps	Goals
YSCC Yokohama	2016	J3 League	0	0	0	0	0	0	0	0	0	0
YSCC Yokohama	2017	J3 League	0	0	0	0	0	0	0	0	0	0
YSCC Yokohama	2018	J3 League	0	0	0	0	0	0	0	0	0	0
YSCC Yokohama	2019	J3 League	16	0	0	0	0	0	0	0	16	0
YSCC Yokohama	2020	J3 League	4	0	0	0	0	0	0	0	4	0
Career total			20	0	0	0	0	0	0	0	20	0
