= Tsubasa Yuge =

Japanese footballer

Personal information
- Date of birth: 5 February 2000 (age 26)
- Place of birth: Saitama, Japan
- Height: 1.77 m (5 ft 10 in)
- Position: Midfielder

Team information
- Current team: Iwate Grulla Morioka
- Number: 8

Youth career
- –2017: Urawa Reds

College career
Years	Team	Apps	(Gls)
2018–2021	Nippon Sport Science University		

Senior career*
Years	Team	Apps	(Gls)
2022–	Iwate Grulla Morioka	56	(2)
Total		56	(2)
- * Club domestic league appearances and goals as of 12:18, 7 January 2024 (AEST)

Tsubasa Yuge (弓削 翼, Yuge Tsubasa; born 5 February 2000) is a Japanese footballer currently playing as a midfielder for Iwate Grulla Morioka.

== Career statistics ==
=== Club ===
As of 5 March 2022.

Club	Season	League			National Cup		League Cup		Other		Total	
Club	Season	Division	Apps	Goals	Apps	Goals	Apps	Goals	Apps	Goals	Apps	Goals
Iwate Grulla Morioka	2022	J2 League	1	0	0	0	0	0	0	0	1	0
Career total			1	0	0	0	0	0	0	0	1	0
