= Tokuma Suzuki =

Japanese professional footballer

Personal information
- Full name: Tokuma Suzuki
- Date of birth: 12 March 1997 (age 29)
- Place of birth: Tochigi, Japan
- Height: 1.68 m (5 ft 6 in)
- Position: Defensive midfielder

Team information
- Current team: Gamba Osaka
- Number: 16

Youth career
- 2009–2011: FC Koga
- 2012–2014: Maebashi Ikuei High School

College career
Years	Team	Apps	(Gls)
2015–2018	University of Tsukuba		

Senior career*
Years	Team	Apps	(Gls)
2019–2021	Tokushima Vortis	85	(1)
2022–2023	Cerezo Osaka	44	(2)
2024–	Gamba Osaka	85	(0)
Medal record
Representing Japan
AFC U-16 Championship
Silver medal – second place	2012 Iran
- * Club domestic league appearances and goals as of 9 August 2026 ‡ National team caps and goals as of 27 May 2019

Tokuma Suzuki (鈴木 徳真, Suzuki Tokuma; born 12 March 1997) is a Japanese professional footballer who plays as a defensive midfielder for Gamba Osaka.

== Early life ==
Suzuki was selected as an outstanding player of the tournament after as captain, he helped the team to a runner-up finish in the All Japan High School Soccer Championship.

== Career ==
On 21 September 2018, Tokushima Vortis announced that Suzuki would join the team from the 2019 season. He scored his first league goal against FC Machida Zelvia on 21 July 2019, scoring in the 17th minute. During the 2019 playoffs, he scored the first goal in the 20th minute, but Tokushima Vortis were unable to win promotion to the J1 League.

After three seasons with Tokushima Vortis, Suzuki moved to Cerezo Osaka in 2022. He signed a new multi-year contract with the club on 9 December 2022.

Suzuki was announced at Gamba Osaka on 11 January 2024. The move re-united him with his former manager, Dani Poyatos.

== International career ==
Suzuki was part of the Japan U-17 squad at the 2013 FIFA U-17 World Cup. He has represented Japan at U-16, U-17 and U-18 levels.

== Club statistics ==
As of match played 8 March 2022

Appearances and goals by club, season and competition
Club	Season	League			National cup		League cup		Other		Total	
Club	Season	Division	Apps	Goals	Apps	Goals	Apps	Goals	Apps	Goals	Apps	Goals
Japan			League		Emperor's Cup		J. League Cup		Other		Total	
Tokushima Vortis	2019	J2 League	15	1	2	0	–		3	1	20	2
Tokushima Vortis	2020	J2 League	38	0	2	2	–		–		40	2
Tokushima Vortis	2021	J1 League	32	0	2	0	5	0	–		39	0
Tokushima Vortis	Total		85	1	6	2	5	0	3	1	99	4
Cerezo Osaka	2022	J1 League	3	0	–		2	0	0	0	5	0
Career total			88	1	6	2	7	0	3	1	104	4

== Honours ==
Gamba Osaka

- AFC Champions League Two: 2025–26
