= Yuya Takazawa =

Japanese footballer

Personal information
- Date of birth: 19 February 1997 (age 29)
- Place of birth: Katsushika, Tokyo, Japan
- Height: 1.79 m (5 ft 10 in)
- Position: Forward

Team information
- Current team: Thespa Gunma
- Number: 10

Youth career
- Minami Ayase FC
- JEFA FC
- 2012–2014: RKU Kashiwa High School

College career
Years	Team	Apps	(Gls)
2015–2018	Ryutsu Keizai University		

Senior career*
Years	Team	Apps	(Gls)
2015–2017	Ryutsu Keizai Dragons Ryugasaki	37	(10)
2019	Thespakusatsu Gunma	27	(17)
2020–2021	Oita Trinita	29	(6)
2021	Albirex Niigata	13	(1)
2022	Giravanz Kitakyushu	19	(7)
2023	FC Machida Zelvia	1	(0)
2024–	Thespa Gunma	39	(6)
- * Club domestic league appearances and goals as of 1 January 2026

Yuya Takazawa (髙澤 優也, Takazawa Yuya; born 19 February 1997) is a Japanese footballer currently playing as a forward for club Thespa Gunma.

== Career statistics ==
=== Club ===
As of 21 March 2020.

Club	Season	League			National Cup		League Cup		Other		Total	
Club	Season	Division	Apps	Goals	Apps	Goals	Apps	Goals	Apps	Goals	Apps	Goals
Ryutsu Keizai Dragons Ryugasaki	2015	JFL	11	2	0	0	–		0	0	11	2
Ryutsu Keizai Dragons Ryugasaki	2016	JFL	12	4	0	0	–		0	0	12	4
Ryutsu Keizai Dragons Ryugasaki	2017	JFL	14	4	0	0	–		0	0	14	4
Ryutsu Keizai Dragons Ryugasaki	Total		37	10	0	0	0	0	0	0	37	10
Ryutsu Keizai University	2018	–			2 (Note: Appearances in the Emperor's Cup)	0	–		0	0	2	0
Thespakusatsu Gunma	2019	J3 League	27	17	2	1	–		0	0	29	18
Oita Trinita	2020	J1 League	24	6	0	0	1 (Note: Appearances in the J.League Cup)	0	0	0	25	4
Oita Trinita	2021	J1 League	5	0	0	0	2	0	0	0	7	0
Oita Trinita	Total		29	6	0	0	3	0	0	0	32	6
Career total			93	33	4	1	3	0	0	0	100	34
