= Diego Taba =

Japanese footballer

Diego Taba 田場 ディエゴ
Personal information
- Date of birth: 31 May 1996 (age 30)
- Place of birth: Fujisawa, Kanagawa, Japan
- Height: 1.70 m (5 ft 7 in)
- Position: Midfielder

Team information
- Current team: YSCC Yokohama
- Number: 6

Youth career
- Komayose Takinosawa SSS
- FC Shonan
- 2012–2014: Nihon Univ. Fujisawa High School

College career
Years	Team	Apps	(Gls)
2015–2018	Kokushikan University		

Senior career*
Years	Team	Apps	(Gls)
2019–	YSCC Yokohama	59	(1)
- * Club domestic league appearances and goals as of 20 December 2022, 20:20 (UTC)

Diego Taba (田場 ディエゴ, Taba Diego; born 31 May 1996) is a Japanese professional footballer who plays as a midfielder. He currently plays for YSCC Yokohama of the J3 League.

== Career ==
Taba's first professional contract with YSCC Yokohama was announced at the start of the 2019 season.

== Personal life ==
Taba is Japanese-Peruvian due to his grandfather.

== Career statistics ==
=== Club ===
As of the start of 2023 season.

Club	Season	League			National Cup		League Cup		Other		Total	
Club	Season	Division	Apps	Goals	Apps	Goals	Apps	Goals	Apps	Goals	Apps	Goals
Kokushikan University	2017	–			2 (Note: Appearances in the Emperor's Cup)	0	–		0	0	2	0
YSCC Yokohama	2019	J3 League	11	1	0	0	–		0	0	11	1
YSCC Yokohama	2020	J3 League	16	0	0	0	–		0	0	16	0
YSCC Yokohama	2021	J3 League	4	0	0	0	–		0	0	4	0
YSCC Yokohama	2022	J3 League	28	0	0	0	–		0	0	28	0
YSCC Yokohama	2023	J3 League	0	0	0	0	–		0	0	0	0
YSCC Yokohama	Total		59	1	0	0	0	0	0	0	59	1
Career total			59	1	2	0	0	0	0	0	61	1
