= Keisuke Ogasawara =

Japanese footballer

Personal information
- Date of birth: 7 June 1996 (age 30)
- Place of birth: Yamaguchi, Japan
- Height: 1.77 m (5 ft 10 in)
- Position: Defender

Team information
- Current team: Sagamihara
- Number: 28

Youth career
- Shunan FC
- Shuho Junior High School
- Renofa Yamaguchi
- 2012–2014: Higashi Fukuoka High School

College career
Years	Team	Apps	(Gls)
2015–2018	University of Tsukuba		

Senior career*
Years	Team	Apps	(Gls)
2019–2022	Roasso Kumamoto	69	(1)
2022–2025	Fujieda MYFC	75	(3)
2024	→ Sagamihara (loan)	13	(0)
2025–	Sagamihara	12	(0)
- * Club domestic league appearances and goals as of 1 January 2026

Keisuke Ogasawara (小笠原 佳祐, Ogasawara Keisuke; born 7 June 1996) is a Japanese professional footballer who plays as a defender for Sagamihara.

== Career ==
On 24 July 2024, Ogasawara joined J3 League side Sagamihara on loan until 31 January 2025.

== Career statistics ==
=== Club ===
As of 12 November 2020.

Club	Season	League			National Cup		League Cup		Other		Total	
Club	Season	Division	Apps	Goals	Apps	Goals	Apps	Goals	Apps	Goals	Apps	Goals
University of Tsukuba	2016	–			1 (Note: Appearances in the Emperor's Cup)	0	–		0	0	1	0
University of Tsukuba	2017	–			4	0	–		0	0	4	0
University of Tsukuba	Total		0	0	5	0	0	0	0	0	5	0
Roasso Kumamoto	2019	J3 League	23	1	2	0	–		0	0	25	1
Roasso Kumamoto	2020	J3 League	24	0	0	0	–		0	0	24	0
Roasso Kumamoto	Total		47	1	2	0	0	0	0	0	49	1
Career total			47	1	7	0	0	0	0	0	54	1
