= Minoru Hanafusa =

Japanese footballer

Personal information
- Date of birth: 30 July 1996 (age 30)
- Place of birth: Tokyo, Japan
- Height: 1.77 m (5 ft 10 in)
- Position: Defender

Team information
- Current team: YSCC Yokohama
- Number: 2

Youth career
- Koyanagi Mamushizaka SC
- Yokogawa Musashino FC
- 2012–2014: Kokugakuin Univ. Kugayama High School

College career
Years	Team	Apps	(Gls)
2015–2018	Kokushikan University		

Senior career*
Years	Team	Apps	(Gls)
2019	FC Ryukyu	0	(0)
2020–	YSCC Yokohama	115	(1)
- * Club domestic league appearances and goals as of 00:09, 16 March 2025 (UTC)

Minoru Hanafusa (花房 稔, Hanafusa Minoru; born 30 July 1996) is a Japanese footballer currently playing as a defender for YSCC Yokohama.

== Career statistics ==
=== Club ===
As of 9 July 2021.

Club	Season	League			National Cup		League Cup		Other		Total	
Club	Season	Division	Apps	Goals	Apps	Goals	Apps	Goals	Apps	Goals	Apps	Goals
FC Ryukyu	2019	J2 League	0	0	0	0	0	0	0	0	0	0
YSCC Yokohama	2020	J3 League	15	1	0	0	–		0	0	15	1
YSCC Yokohama	2021	J3 League	7	0	0	0	–		0	0	7	0
YSCC Yokohama	Total		22	1	0	0	0	0	0	0	22	1
Career total			22	1	0	0	0	0	0	0	22	1
