= Kensei Nakashima =

Japanese footballer

Kensei Nakashima 中島 賢星
Personal information
- Full name: Kensei Nakashima
- Date of birth: 23 August 1996 (age 30)
- Place of birth: Saga, Japan
- Height: 1.80 m (5 ft 11 in)
- Position: Midfielder

Team information
- Current team: Renofa Yamaguchi FC
- Number: 4

Youth career
- Yokohama F. Marinos
- Buddy FC
- Avispa Fukuoka
- 2012–2014: Higashi Fukuoka High School

Senior career*
Years	Team	Apps	(Gls)
2015–2017	Yokohama F. Marinos	0	(0)
2015	→ J. League U-22 (loan)	15	(1)
2017	→ FC Gifu (loan)	6	(0)
2018–2021	FC Gifu	112	(9)
2022	SC Sagamihara	23	(0)
2023–2025	Nara Club	97	(7)
2026–	Renofa Yamaguchi FC	17	(2)
Medal record
Yokohama F. Marinos
Runner-up	Emperor's Cup	2017
- * Club domestic league appearances and goals as of 21 August 2026

Kensei Nakashima (中島 賢星, Nakashima Kensei, born 23 September 1996 in Saga, Japan) is a Japanese football player who plays as a midfielder for Renofa Yamaguchi FC.

== Club career ==
On 9 December 2022, Nakashima joined J3 newly promoted, Nara Club for upcoming 2023 season after a season at SC Sagamihara in 2022.

== Career statistics ==
As of the start from 2023 season.

Appearances and goals by club, season and competition
Club	Season	League			Emperor's Cup		J. League Cup		Total	
Club	Season	Division	Apps	Goals	Apps	Goals	Apps	Goals	Apps	Goals
Yokohama F. Marinos	2015	J1 League	0	0	0	0	3	0	3	0
Yokohama F. Marinos	2016	J1 League	0	0	1	0	3	0	4	0
Yokohama F. Marinos	2017	J1 League	0	0	1	0	6	1	7	1
FC Gifu	2017	J2 League	6	0	0	0	—		6	0
FC Gifu	2018	J2 League	30	2	1	0	—		31	2
FC Gifu	2019	J2 League	24	0	1	0	—		25	0
FC Gifu	2020	J3 League	32	5	0	0	—		32	5
FC Gifu	2021	J3 League	26	2	1	0	—		27	2
SC Sagamihara	2022	J3 League	23	0	0	0	—		23	0
Nara Club	2023	J3 League	0	0	0	0	—		0	0
Career total			141	9	5	0	12	1	158	10
