= Hiroshi Yoshinaga =

Japanese footballer (born 1996)

Hiroshi Yoshinaga 吉永 大志
Personal information
- Full name: Hiroshi Yoshinaga
- Date of birth: 14 October 1996 (age 30)
- Place of birth: Takasaki, Gunma, Japan
- Height: 1.73 m (5 ft 8 in)
- Position: Midfielder

Team information
- Current team: Fukushima United
- Number: 8

Youth career
- Fanaticos
- JFA Academy Fukushima
- –2014: Maebashi Ikuei High School

College career
Years	Team	Apps	(Gls)
2015–2018	Nihon University		

Senior career*
Years	Team	Apps	(Gls)
2019–	Fukushima United	133	(4)
- * Club domestic league appearances and goals as of January 1st, 2026

Hiroshi Yoshinaga (吉永 大志, Yoshinaga Hiroshi; born 14 October 1996) is a Japanese footballer currently playing as a midfielder for Fukushima United.

== Career statistics ==
=== Club ===
Updated to January 1st, 2022.

Club	Season	League			National Cup		League Cup		Other		Total	
Club	Season	Division	Apps	Goals	Apps	Goals	Apps	Goals	Apps	Goals	Apps	Goals
Fukushima United	2019	J3 League	5	0	0	0	–		0	0	5	0
Fukushima United	2020	J3 League	31	0	0	0	–		0	0	31	0
Fukushima United	2021	J3 League	24	3	0	0	–		0	0	24	3
Career total			60	3	0	0	0	0	0	0	60	3
