= Takeaki Hommura =

Japanese footballer (born 1997)

Personal information
- Date of birth: 20 June 1997 (age 29)
- Place of birth: Tokyo, Japan
- Height: 1.78 m (5 ft 10 in)
- Position: Defender

Team information
- Current team: Giravanz Kitakyushu (on loan from JEF United Chiba)
- Number: 5

Youth career
- Matsugaya FC
- FC Tama
- 2013–2015: RKU Kashiwa High School

College career
Years	Team	Apps	(Gls)
2016–2019	Ryutsu Keizai University		

Senior career*
Years	Team	Apps	(Gls)
2019–2022	JEF United Chiba	13	(0)
2021	→ Giravanz Kitakyushu (loan)	11	(0)
2022–	Giravanz Kitakyushu	37	(1)
- * Club domestic league appearances and goals as of 18:06, 5 September 2023 (UTC)

Takeaki Hommura (本村 武揚, Hommura Takeaki; born 20 June 1997) is a Japanese footballer currently playing as a defender for Giravanz Kitakyushu.

== Career statistics ==
=== Club ===
As of 13 July 2021.

Club	Season	League			National Cup		League Cup		Other		Total	
Club	Season	Division	Apps	Goals	Apps	Goals	Apps	Goals	Apps	Goals	Apps	Goals
Ryutsu Keizai University	2018	–			2 (Note: Appearance(s) in Emperor's Cup)	0	–		0	0	2	0
Ryutsu Keizai University	2019	–			1	0	–		0	0	1	0
Ryutsu Keizai University	Total		0	0	3	0	0	0	0	0	3	0
JEF United Chiba	2019	J2 League	1	0	0	0	0	0	0	0	1	0
JEF United Chiba	2020	J2 League	12	0	0	0	0	0	0	0	12	0
JEF United Chiba	2021	J2 League	0	0	0	0	0	0	0	0	0	0
JEF United Chiba	Total		13	0	0	0	0	0	0	0	13	0
Giravanz Kitakyushu (loan)	2021	J2 League	11	0	0	0	0	0	0	0	11	0
Career total			11	0	3	0	0	0	0	0	14	0
