= Koki Matsumura =

Japanese footballer

Koki Matsumura 松村 航希
Personal information
- Date of birth: 24 May 1996 (age 30)
- Place of birth: Hyogo, Japan
- Height: 1.75 m (5 ft 9 in)
- Position: Midfielder

Team information
- Current team: YSCC Yokohama

Youth career
- Nissei Chuo SC
- –2014: Vissel Kobe

College career
| Years | Team | Apps | (Gls) |
| 2015–2018 | Osaka Kyoiku University | | |

Senior career*
| Years | Team | Apps | (Gls) |
| 2019–2022 | Fujieda MYFC | 46 | (3) |
| 2023– | YSCC Yokohama | 43 | (5) |
- * Club domestic league appearances and goals as of 11 September 2024

Koki Matsumura (松村 航希, Matsumura Kōki; born 24 May 1996) is a Japanese footballer who plays as a midfielder and currently play for YSCC Yokohama.

== Career ==
On 28 February 2023, Matsumura announcement officially transfer to J3 club, YSCC Yokohama for ahead of 2023 season.

== Career statistics ==
=== Club ===
As of 1 March 2023.

| Club | Season | League | | | National Cup | | League Cup | | Other | | Total | |
| Club | Season | Division | Apps | Goals | Apps | Goals | Apps | Goals | Apps | Goals | Apps | Goals |
|---|---|---|---|---|---|---|---|---|---|---|---|---|
| Fujieda MYFC | 2019 | J3 League | 0 | 0 | 0 | 0 | – | | 0 | 0 | 0 | 0 |
| Fujieda MYFC | 2020 | J3 League | 0 | 0 | 0 | 0 | – | | 0 | 0 | 0 | 0 |
| Fujieda MYFC | 2021 | J3 League | 23 | 2 | 1 | 0 | – | | 0 | 0 | 24 | 2 |
| Fujieda MYFC | 2022 | J3 League | 23 | 1 (Note: Include Emperor's Cup) | 0 | 0 | – | | 0 | 0 | 23 | 1 |
| YSCC Yokohama | 2023 | J3 League | 0 | 0 | 0 | 0 | – | | 0 | 0 | 0 | 0 |
| Career total | | | 46 | 3 | 1 | 0 | 0 | 0 | 0 | 0 | 47 | 3 |
