= Kitakami Sports Park Athletic Stadium =

Multi-use stadium in Kitakami, Iwate, Japan

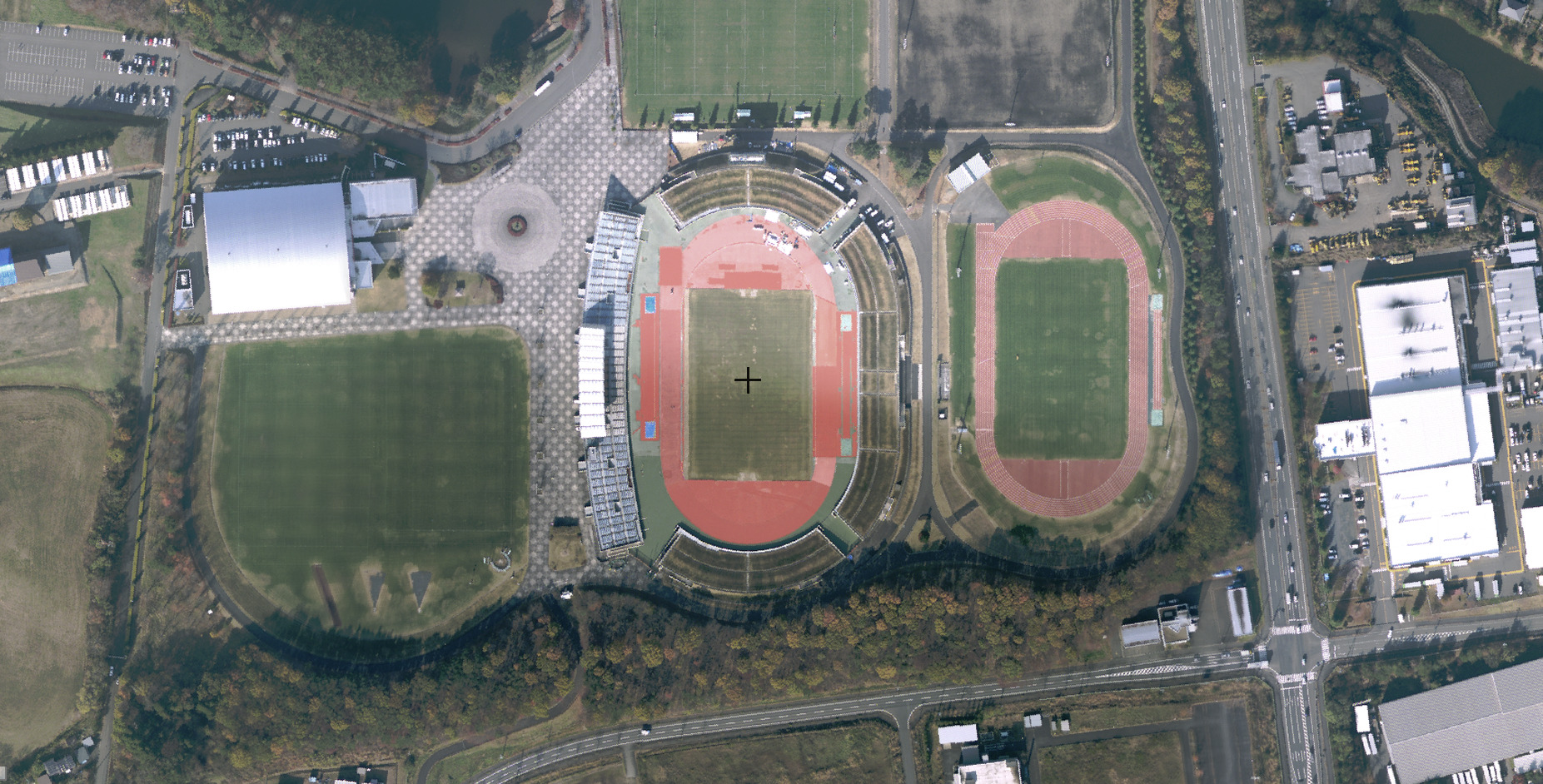
- Interactive map of Kitakami Sports Park Athletic Stadium
- Former names: Kitakami Stadium
- Location: Kitakami, Iwate, Japan
- Coordinates: 39.25804°N 141.09608°E
- Owner: City of Kitakami
- Operator: Kitakami Sports Association
- Capacity: 22,000
- Surface: Grass

Construction
- Opened: 1997

Tenant
- Iwate Grulla Morioka

Kitakami Sports Park Athletic Stadium (北上総合運動公園陸上競技場), also known as SanDisk Stadium Kitakami (サンディスクスタジアムきたかみ) for sponsorship reasons, is a multi-use stadium in Kitakami, Iwate, Japan. It is used mostly for track and field events. The stadium holds 22,000 people. From 1 October 2023, its current naming rights are owned by Western Digital LLC, who bought the stadium's naming rights from October 2023 to September 2028.

== Past events ==
- 1999 Inter-high Games opening ceremony
- 2016 National Sports Festival of Japan opening ceremony
