= Yokohama Mitsuzawa Athletic Stadium =

Athletic stadium in Yokohama, Kanagawa, Japan

- 三ツ沢公園陸上競技場
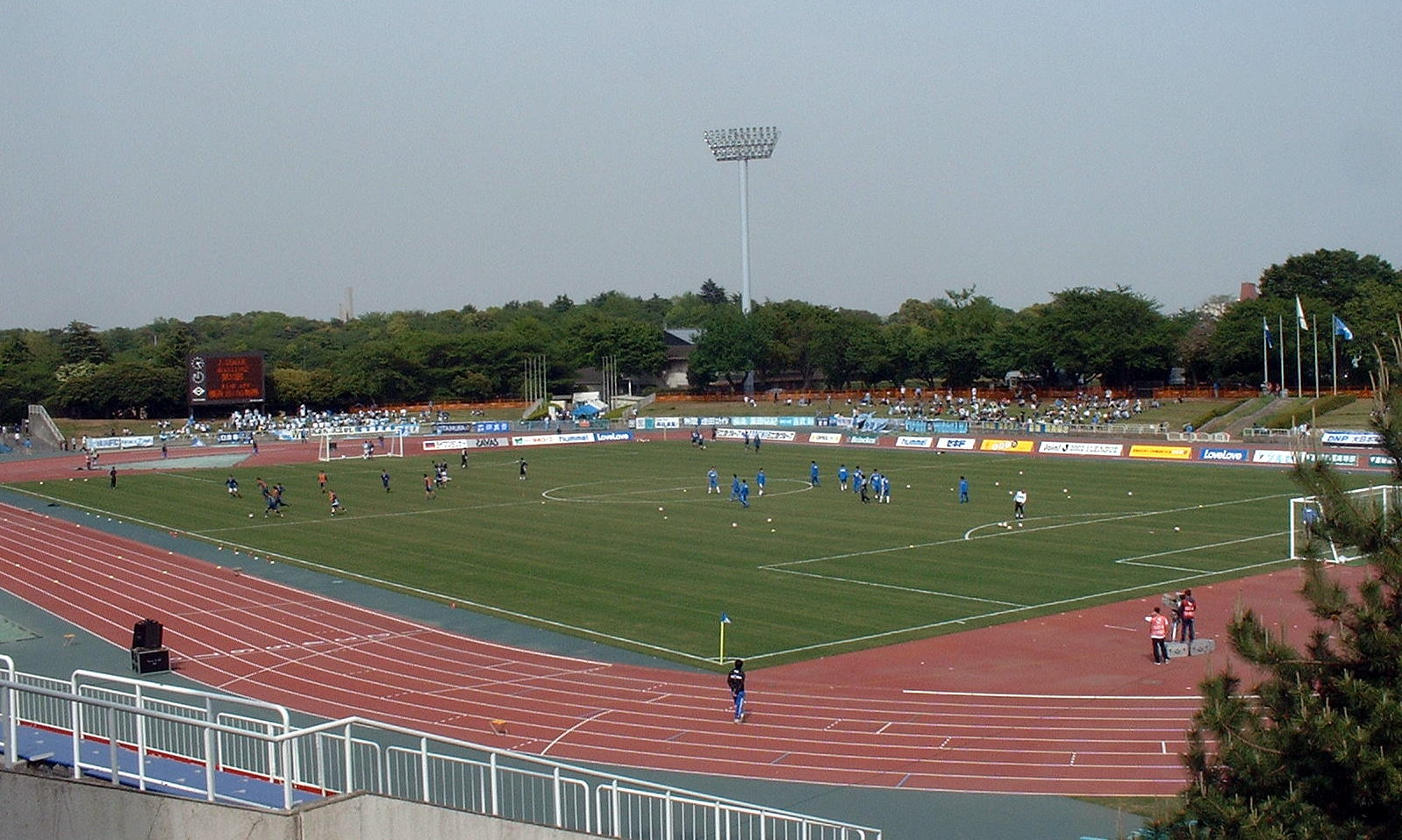
- Interactive map of Yokohama Mitsuzawa Athletic Stadium
- Location: Yokohama, Kanagawa, Japan
- Coordinates: 35.4700°N 139.6015°E
- Owner: Yokohama City
- Capacity: 18,300

Construction
- Opened: 1951

Tenant
- YSCC Yokohama

Website
- Official site

Yokohama Mitsuzawa Athletic Stadium (三ツ沢公園陸上競技場) is an athletic stadium in Yokohama, Kanagawa, Japan.

It was one of the home stadiums of football club YSCC Yokohama.
