= Iwate Grulla Morioka =

Japanese football club

Iwate Grulla Morioka いわてグルージャ盛岡
- Full name: Iwate Grulla Morioka
- Nickname: Tsuru (The Cranes)
- Founded: 2003; 23 years ago
- Stadium: Iwagin Stadium; Morioka, Iwate
- Capacity: 4,938
- Chairman: Yutaka Akita
- Manager: Kei Hoshikawa
- League: Japan Football League
- 2025: 9th of 16
- Website: grulla-morioka.jp
| Home colours | Away colours |

Iwate Grulla Morioka (いわてグルージャ盛岡, Iwate Gurūja Morioka) is a Japanese association football club based in Morioka, capital of Iwate Prefecture. They play in Japan Football League from 2025, the Japanese fourth tier of semi-professional football after relegation from J3 League in 2024.

== Name origin ==
"Grulla" is the Spanish word of "crane", which was used in the mon of Nanbu clan of former Morioka han and later became the local symbol of Morioka.

== History ==
Initially known as Villanova Morioka (ヴィラノーバ盛岡, Viranōba Morioka), the team was organised by alumni of Morioka Commercial High School and Morioka Chuo High School in 2000.

In 2003, a nonprofit organisation Association of Setting Up a J. League Team in Morioka (Jリーグチームを盛岡に作る会, J Rīgu chīmu wo Morioka ni tsukuru kai) was founded, and the team was reorganised and changed their name to Grulla Morioka (グルージャ盛岡) in February 2004 with the intention of achieving promotion to the J. League by 2008.

Under the new organisation, former JEF United and Oita Trinita player Shinichi Muto was invited to coach and captain the team with the company of players from the defunct Villanova Morioka and from J2 league. They played their first match on May 9, 2004, and it could be seen as an introduction to the local press beforehand. They won the Tohoku Soccer League second division in 2004 and therefore promotion to the first division for the 2005 season. In 2005 season, they won their first of six league championships, which they shared with TDK S.C.

In 2013 they won the Regional Promotion Series and were promoted directly to the newly formed J3 League, skipping the Japan Football League which became the new fourth tier.

From the 2019 season, the club has adopted the new name as "Iwate Grulla Morioka". In 2021 they earned promotion to the J2 League as J3 runners-up and made their debut in the second tier in 2022.

On 28 October 2022, Iwate Grulla Morioka acquired the J1 License, meaning that from the 2022 season, they can now be promoted to the J1 League if the club finishes in J2's Top 2.

The team played in the inaugural season of J3 League in 2014 after winning the Tohoku Soccer League, one of the Japanese Regional Leagues, in 2013. Iwate played in the J3 until 2021, when was promoted to the J2 for the 2022 season.

=== Downfall to Third and Fourth tier in two years ===
After just one season in the second division, the club were relegated back to the J3 after finishing in 22nd and last place in the league with a total of thirty-four points.

On 3 November 2024, Iwate finished in 20th and last place after drawing 1-1 against Zweigen Kanazawa playing away from home and possibility relegation to JFL for the first time in history from the 2025 season. On 17 November, relegation to JFL was confirmed for Iwate after Tochigi City FC secured promotion automatically to J3 League for the first time in their history.

== Stadium ==
Iwate plays at (or have played) at three stadiums. Their main stadium is Iwagin Stadium, which has a capacity of 4,938.

The second stadium is the Kitakami Stadium, located in the city of Kitakami, Iwate, which has a capacity of 6,376.

They have played before at the Iwate Morioka Stadium.

== League & cup record ==
| Champions | Runners-up | Third place | Promoted | Relegated |

| League | | | | | | | | | | | | | | J. League Cup | Emperor's Cup | Shakaijin Cup |
| Season | Division | Tier | Teams | Pos. | P | W | D | L | F | A | GD | Pts | Attendance\G | J. League Cup | Emperor's Cup | Shakaijin Cup |
|---|---|---|---|---|---|---|---|---|---|---|---|---|---|---|---|---|
Grulla Morioka
| 2003 | Tohoku League; Div. 2 North | 5 | 6 | 4th | 10 | 5 | 3 | 2 | 16 | 12 | 4 | 18 | | Not eligible | | |
| 2004 | Tohoku League; Div. 2 North | 5 | 6 | 1st | 10 | 9 | 1 | 0 | 54 | 9 | 45 | 28 | | Not eligible | | |
| 2005 | Tohoku League; Div. 1 | 4 | 7 | 1st | 12 | 9 | 2 | 1 | 36 | 10 | 26 | 29 | | Not eligible | 1st round | |
| 2006 | Tohoku League; Div. 1 | 4 | 8 | 2nd | 14 | 11 | 0 | 3 | 32 | 18 | 14 | 30 | | Not eligible | | |
| 2007 | Tohoku League; Div. 1 | 4 | 8 | 1st | 14 | 13 | 0 | 1 | 65 | 14 | 51 | 39 | | Not eligible | | |
| 2008 | Tohoku League; Div. 1 | 4 | 8 | 1st | 14 | 12 | 2 | 0 | 63 | 8 | 55 | 38 | | Not eligible | 2nd round | |
| 2009 | Tohoku League; Div. 1 | 4 | 8 | 1st | 14 | 11 | 3 | 0 | 59 | 15 | 44 | 36 | | Not eligible | 1st round | |
| 2010 | Tohoku League; Div. 1 | 4 | 8 | 1st | 14 | 12 | 1 | 1 | 57 | 11 | 46 | 37 | | Not eligible | 2nd round | |
| 2011 | Tohoku League; Div. 1 | 4 | 7 | 2nd | 12 | 8 | 3 | 1 | 35 | 15 | 20 | 27 | | Not eligible | 1st round | 2nd round |
| 2012 | Tohoku League; Div. 1 | 4 | 7 | 2nd | 12 | 10 | 0 | 2 | 48 | 5 | 43 | 30 | | Not eligible | 1st round | |
| 2013 | Tohoku League; Div. 1 | 4 | 10 | 1st | 18 | 16 | 1 | 1 | 95 | 10 | 85 | 49 | | Not eligible | 1st round | Runner's up |
| 2014 | J3 | 3 | 12 | 5th | 33 | 12 | 9 | 12 | 34 | 25 | 9 | 45 | 1,522 | Not eligible | 1st round | Not eligible |
| 2015 | J3 | 3 | 13 | 11th | 36 | 11 | 8 | 17 | 36 | 47 | −11 | 35 | 1,239 | Not eligible | 1st round | Not eligible |
| 2016 | J3 | 3 | 16 | 13th | 30 | 6 | 12 | 12 | 43 | 47 | −4 | 30 | 1,182 | Not eligible | 3rd round | Not eligible |
| 2017 | J3 | 3 | 17 | 15th | 32 | 7 | 8 | 17 | 32 | 49 | −17 | 29 | 1,337 | Not eligible | 2nd round | Not eligible |
| 2018 | J3 | 3 | 17 | 13th | 32 | 12 | 4 | 16 | 41 | 56 | −15 | 40 | 1,216 | Not eligible | 1st round | Not eligible |
Iwate Grulla Morioka
| 2019 | J3 | 3 | 18 | 18th | 34 | 7 | 5 | 22 | 36 | 63 | −27 | 26 | 1,368 | Not eligible | 2nd round | Not eligible |
| 2020 † | J3 | 3 | 18 | 11th | 34 | 11 | 9 | 14 | 36 | 47 | -11 | 42 | 481 | Not eligible | Did not qualify | Not eligible |
| 2021 | J3 | 3 | 15 | 2nd | 28 | 15 | 8 | 5 | 43 | 28 | 15 | 53 | 1,394 | Not eligible | 3rd round | Not eligible |
| 2022 | J2 | 2 | 22 | 22nd | 42 | 9 | 7 | 26 | 35 | 80 | -45 | 34 | 3,087 | Not eligible | 3rd round | Not eligible |
| 2023 | J3 | 3 | 20 | 10th | 38 | 15 | 9 | 14 | 48 | 49 | -1 | 54 | 1,254 | Not eligible | 2nd round | Not eligible |
| 2024 | J3 | 3 | 20 | 20th | 38 | 5 | 7 | 26 | 27 | 80 | -53 | 22 | 1,362 | 2nd round | 2nd round | Not eligible |
| 2025 | JFL | 4 | 16 | 9th | 30 | 11 | 6 | 13 | 45 | 49 | -4 | 39 | 1,524 | Not eligible | 2nd round | Not eligible |
| 2026-27 | JFL | 4 | 16 | TBD | | | | | | | | | | Not eligible | | |

Key

- Pos. = Position in league; P = Games played; W = Games won; D = Games drawn; L = Games lost; F = Goals scored; A = Goals conceded; GD = Goals difference; Pts = Points gained
- Attendance/G = Average home league attendance
- † 2020 season attendance reduced by COVID-19 worldwide pandemic
- Source: J.League Data Site

== Honours ==
Iwate Grulla Morioka Honours
| Honour | No. | Years |
|---|---|---|
| Tohoku League Div. 2 North | 1 | 2004 |
| Iwate Prefectural Football Championship (Emperor's Cup Iwate Prefectural Qualifiers) | 17 | 2005, 2008, 2009, 2010, 2011, 2012, 2013, 2014, 2015, 2016, 2017, 2018, 2019, 2021, 2023, 2024, 2025 |
| Tohoku League Div. 1 | 6 | 2005 (Shared with TDK), 2007, 2008, 2009, 2010, 2013 |
| Regional Football Champions League | 1 | 2013 |

== Current squad ==
As of 7 July 2025. Note: Flags indicate national team as defined under FIFA eligibility rules; some limited exceptions apply. Players may hold more than one non-FIFA nationality.

| No. | Pos. | Nation | Player |
|---|---|---|---|
| 3 | DF | JPN | Yuan Shimazu |
| 4 | DF | JPN | Yusuke Muta |
| 6 | MF | HAI | Cédric Toussaint |
| 7 | FW | JPN | Shumpei Fukahori |
| 8 | MF | JPN | Tsubasa Yuge |
| 9 | FW | BRA | Sillas |
| 11 | FW | JPN | Noriaki Fujimoto |
| 13 | MF | JPN | Daiki Kogure |
| 14 | MF | JPN | Takahiro Nakazato |
| 16 | DF | PRK | Ryu Se-gun |
| 17 | FW | JPN | Taishiro Okazaki |
| 18 | MF | JPN | Shuto Kawai |
| 19 | FW | KOR | Won Tae-rang |
| 21 | MF | JPN | Hiroto Domoto |
| 22 | DF | JPN | Daigo Nishi |
| 23 | FW | JPN | Atsutaka Nakamura |
| 25 | DF | JPN | Koji Wada |

| No. | Pos. | Nation | Player |
|---|---|---|---|
| 28 | MF | JPN | Koki Matsumura |
| 29 | FW | JPN | Yu Machida |
| 30 | MF | JPN | Atsuki Wada |
| 32 | DF | JPN | Taku Saito |
| 33 | DF | JPN | Shusei Yamauchi |
| 36 | GK | JPN | Haruki Tanaka |
| 39 | MF | JPN | Shota Yomesaka |
| 40 | GK | JPN | Takuma Narahashi |
| 44 | DF | JPN | Eiru Aratama |
| 49 | MF | JPN | Yuki Kobayashi |
| 50 | GK | JPN | Manafu Wakabayashi (on loan from RB Omiya Ardija) |
| 55 | MF | JPN | Jukiya Fujishima |
| 61 | MF | JPN | Kaichi Iwabuchi |
| 62 | DF | JPN | Katsumi Yanagawa |
| 63 | DF | JPN | Toma Nanao |
| 77 | MF | JPN | Kanta Komatsu |
| 80 | MF | JPN | Mao Hamana |

== Club staff ==
| Position | Staff |
|---|---|
| Chairman | (Japan) Yutaka Akita |
| Manager | (Japan) Kei Hoshikawa |
| Assistant managers | (Japan) Tetsuji Nakamikawa (South Korea) Kim Song-yong |
| First-team coach and Technical coach | (Japan) Kazuki Fukayama |
| Goalkeeper coach | (Japan) Izumi Niinuma |
| Physical coach | (Japan) Yusuke Hoshigami |
| Trainer | (Japan) Nobuyuki Sasaki (Japan) Yuji Hanzawa (Japan) Takuya Miyagawa |
| Physiotherapist | (Japan) Kotaro Watanabe |
| Competent | (Japan) Kazuki Oshima |
| Side affairs | (Japan) Yuto Sugawara |
| Team doctor | (Japan) Moritaka Maruyama (Japan) Goro Tajima (Japan) Ryunosuke Oikawa (Japan) Shinya Oikawa (Japan) Yasutaka Oya (Japan) Ko Tanifuji (Japan) Hiroki Kaneko (Japan) Shuntaro Wada (Japan) Yusuke Chiba (Japan) Masanori Matsuura |
| Sports pharmacist | (Japan) Ikumi Sugiyama |

== Managerial history ==
| Manager | Nationality | Tenure | |
| Manager | Nationality | Start | Finish |
|---|---|---|---|
| Shinobu Yoshida | Japan | 2003 | |
| Shinichi Muto | Japan | 2004 | 2005 |
| Toru Yoshida | Japan | 2006 | 2010 |
| Naoki Naruo | Japan | 1 February 2012 | 31 January 2016 |
| Akihiko Kamikawa | Japan | 1 February 2016 | 31 December 2016 |
| Toshimi Kikuchi | Japan | 1 February 2017 | 31 January 2020 |
| Yutaka Akita | Japan | 1 February 2020 | 31 January 2023 |
| Yoshika Matsubara | Japan | 1 February 2023 | 19 September 2023 |
| Tetsuji Nakamikawa | Japan | 20 September 2023 | 7 May 2024 |
| Takuya Jinno | Japan | 8 May 2024 | 17 August 2024 |
| Kei Hoshikawa | Japan | 18 August 2024 | Current |

== Kit evolution ==
Home Kits - 1st
| 2015 | 2016 | 2017 | 2018 | 2019 |
| 2020 | 2021 | 2022 | 2023 | 2024 |
2025 -

Away Kits - 2nd
| 2015 | 2016 | 2017 | 2018 | 2019 |
| 2020 | 2021 | 2022 | 2023 | 2024 |
2025 -

Special Kits - 3rd
| 2021 3rd | 2024; 20th Anniversary |
