= Iwagin Stadium =

Football stadium in Morioka, Japan

- いわぎんスタジアム
- Iwasuta
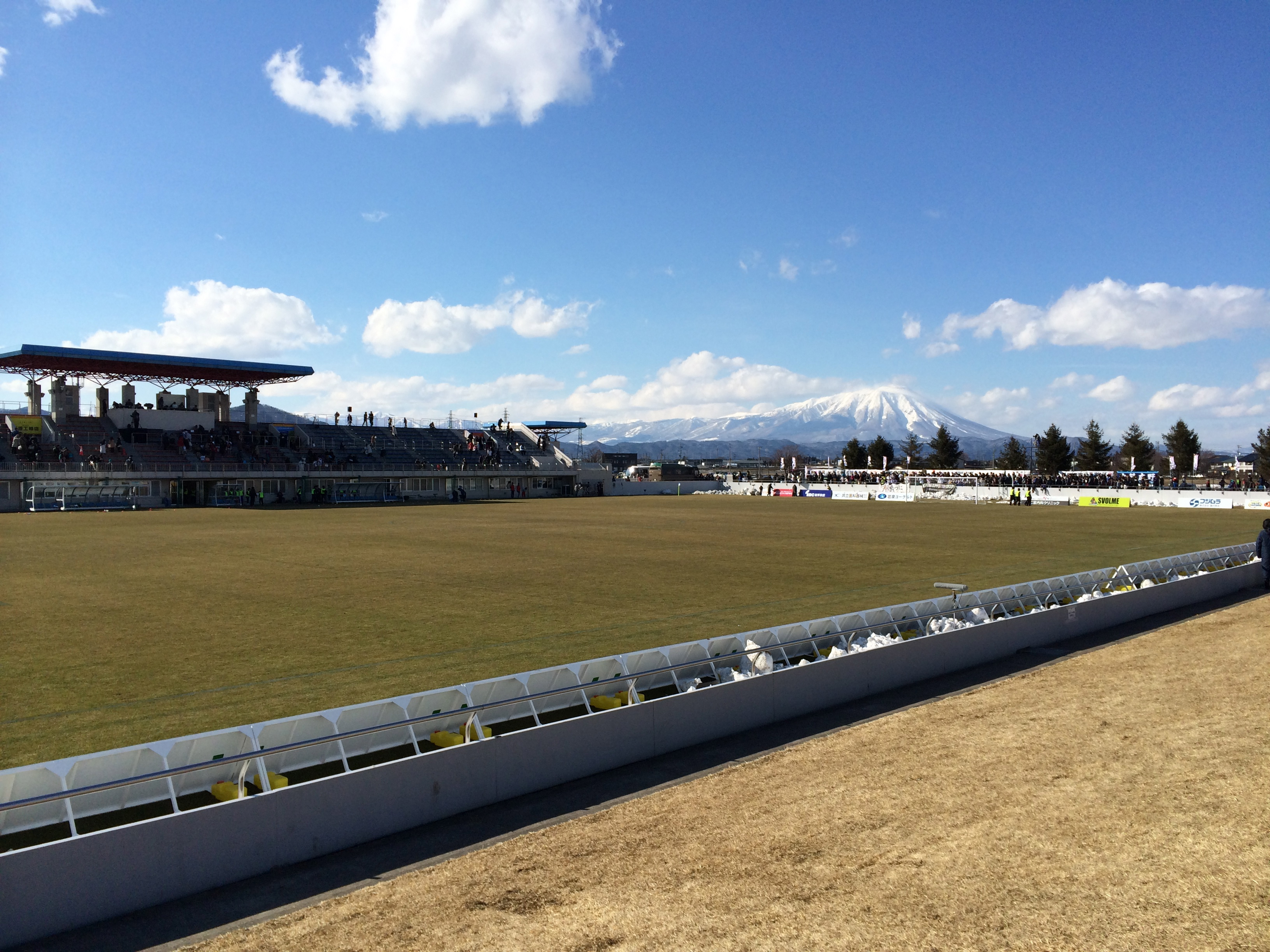
- Interactive map of Iwagin Stadium
- Former names: Morioka Minami Park Stadium (1998–2016)
- Location: Morioka, Iwate, Japan
- Coordinates: 39.64831°N 141.13786°E
- Owner: Morioka City
- Operator: Morioka City Amateur Athletic Association
- Capacity: A Ground:4,946; B Ground:4,946

Construction
- Opened: 1998

Tenant
- Iwate Grulla Morioka

Website
- Official site

Iwagin Stadium (いわぎんスタジアム) is a football stadium in Morioka, Iwate Prefecture, Japan. It was formerly known as Morioka Minami Park Stadium. Since April 2016 it has been called Iwagin Stadium for the naming rights by Bank of Iwate.

It is the home stadium of football club Iwate Grulla Morioka.

== Gallery ==
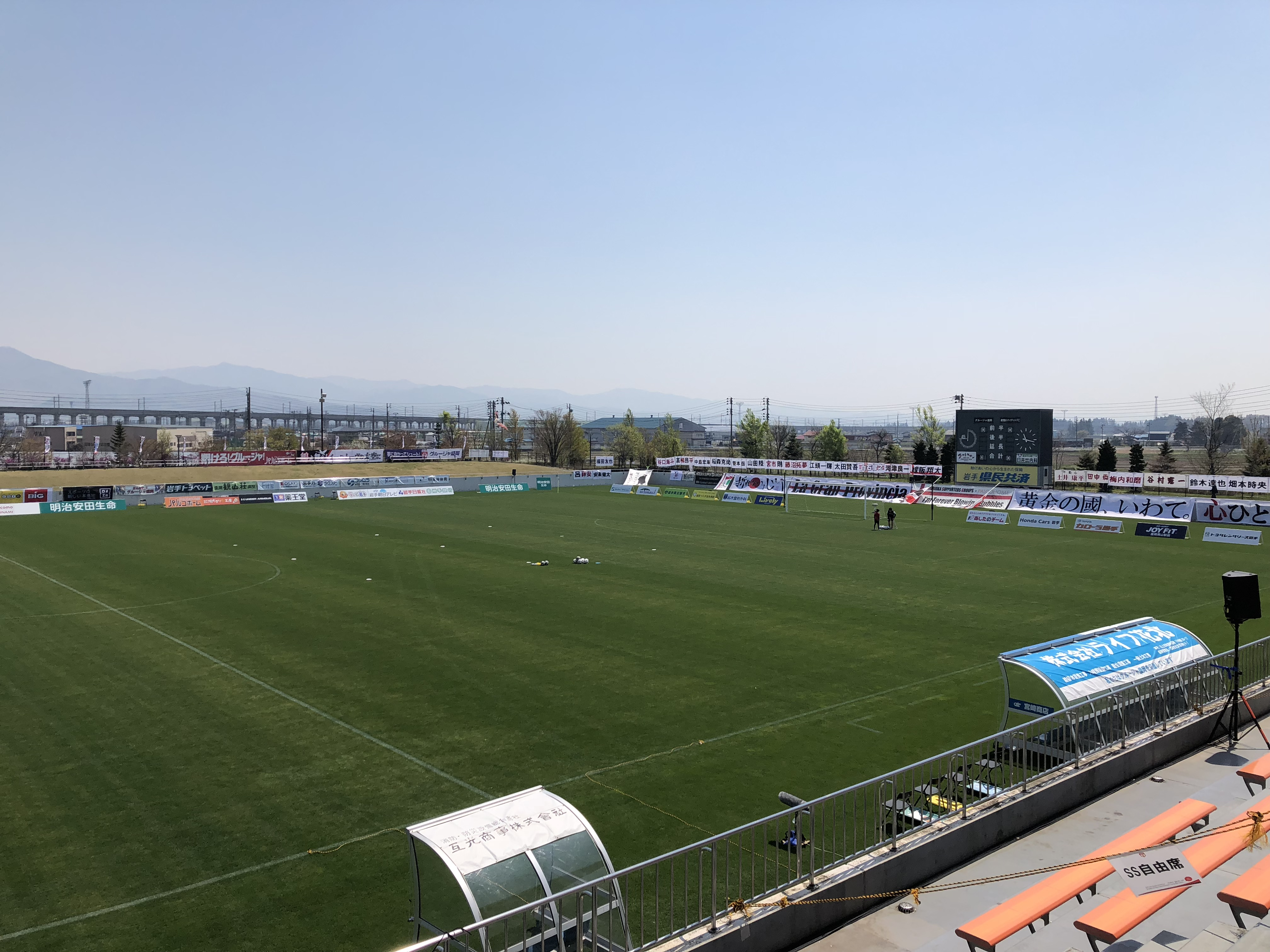

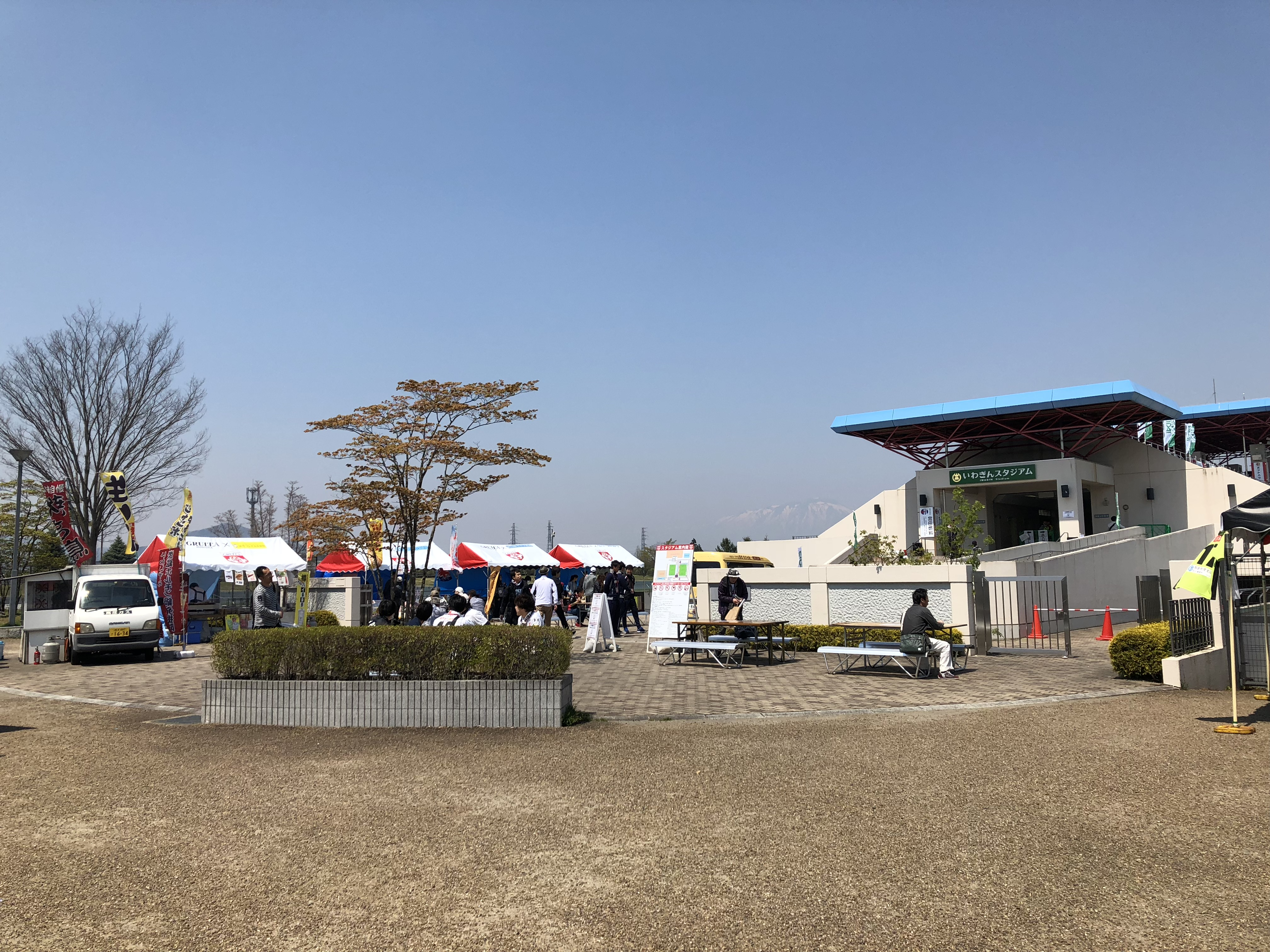
South exit

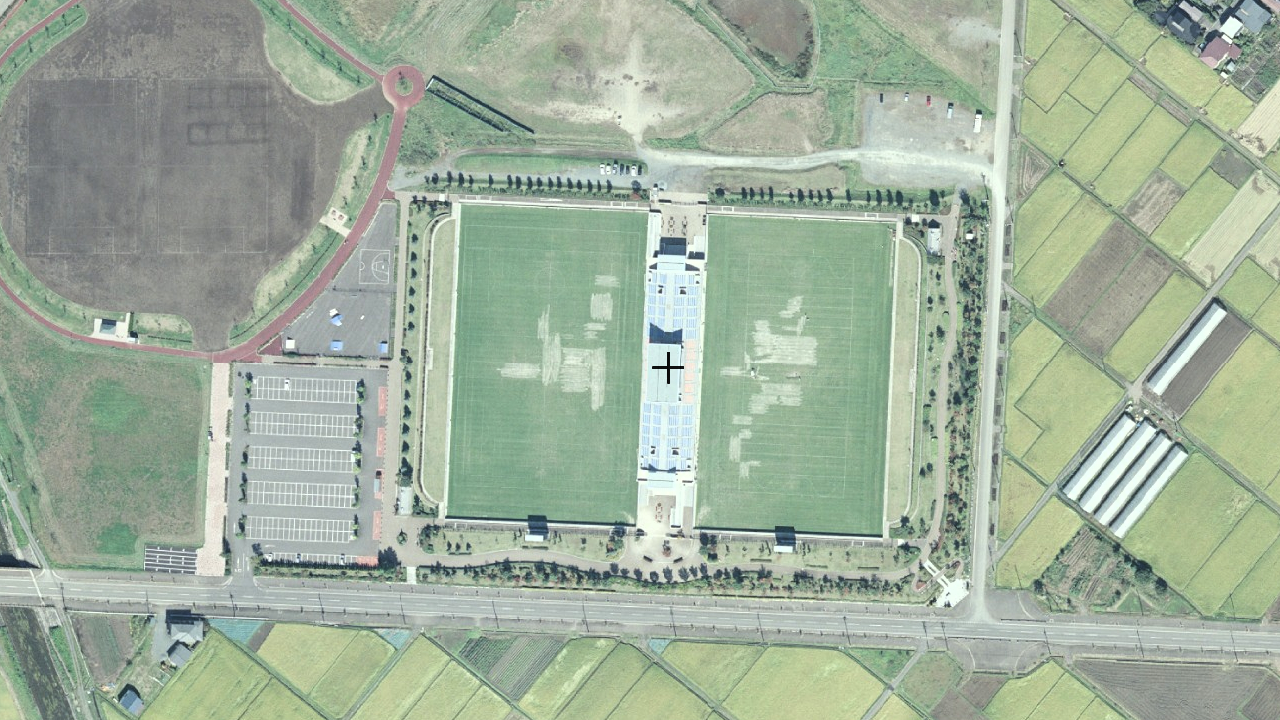
Satellite view in 2008
