= YSCC Yokohama =

Japanese football club

Y.S.C.C. Yokohama Y.S.C.C.横浜
- Full name: NPO Yokohama Sports and Culture Club
- Nickname: YSCC
- Founded: 1986; 40 years ago
- Stadium: Nippatsu Mitsuzawa Stadium; Kanagawa-ku, Yokohama, Kanagawa
- Capacity: 15,454
- Chairman: Jiro Yoshino
- Manager: Tsuyoshi Omatsu
- League: Japan Football League
- 2025: 13th of 16
- Website: yscc1986.net
Home colours	Away colours

Yokohama Sports & Culture Club (横浜スポーツ&カルチャークラブ, Yokohama Supōtsu Ando Karuchākurabu), commonly referred to as simply Y.S.C.C. or Y.S.C.C. Yokohama (Y.S.C.C.横浜 or simply YS横浜, Wai Esushishi Yokohama or simply Wai Esu Yokohama) is a Japanese multisports club based in Yokohama, Kanagawa Prefecture. Although they compete in a number of different sports, YSCC is best known for its association football team that set to play in Japan Football League from 2025 after relegation from J3 in 2024, Japanese fourth tier of football.

== History ==
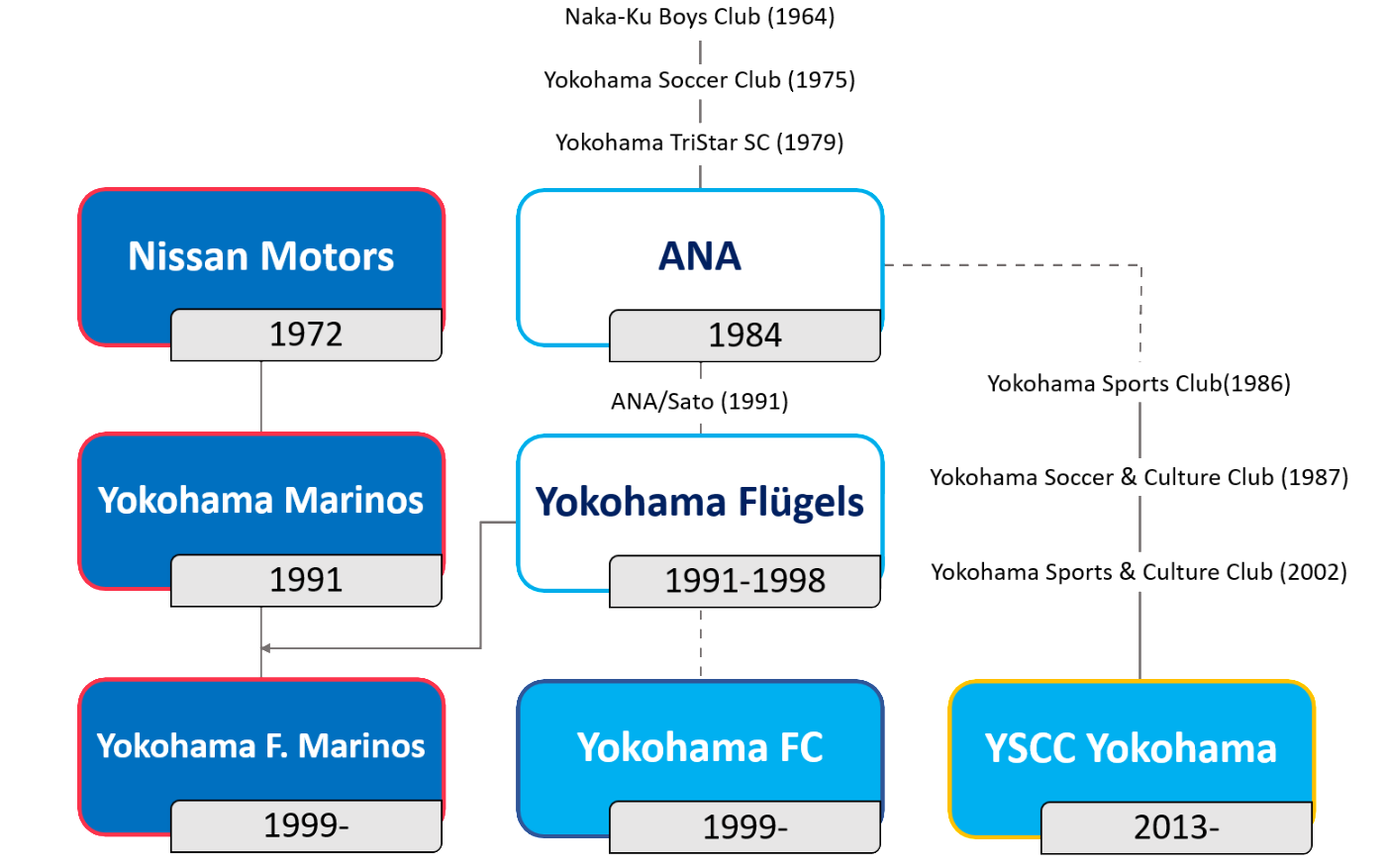
Graphical timeline of Yokohama football clubs

The club was formed in 1986 by former ANA players under the name Yokohama Soccer & Culture Club. The "S" was changed to "Sports" in 2002.

Y.S.C.C. Yokohama was the starting point for many Yokohama Flügels and Yokohama F. Marinos players. When the Flügels folded in 1999, they supported the creation of Yokohama FC to replace them.

In 2012, they played Japan Football League for the first time and finished in 6th position.

After two seasons spent at JFL, YSCC Yokohama play in newly formed league, J3 from 2014.

On 7 December 2024, YSCC Yokohama secure relegation to Japan Football League after defeat from Kochi United SC 0-2 in 2nd leg of J3/JFL play-offs and lost aggregate 1-3, ended 11 years in third tier.

== Stadium and training ground ==
Their home stadium is NHK Spring Mitsuzawa Football Stadium in Kanagawa Ward.

There are two practice grounds, Yokohama Country and Athletic Club and Sea Park Nagisa Ground.

== League and cup record ==
Champions	Runners-up	Third place	Promoted	Relegated

League														J. League Cup	Emperor's Cup	Shakaijin Cup
Season	Div.	Tier	Teams	Pos.	P	W	D	L	F	A	GD	Pts	Attendance/G	J. League Cup	Emperor's Cup	Shakaijin Cup
2010	Kantō League; Div. 1	4	8	1st	14	11	0	3	51	17	34	33		Not eligible	1st round	
2011	Kantō League; Div. 1	4	8	1st	14	12	1	1	34	8	26	37		Not eligible	1st round	
2012	JFL	3	17	6th	32	15	4	13	58	50	8	49	710	Not eligible	2nd round	Not eligible
2013	JFL	3	18	12th	34	11	6	17	45	56	-11	39	783	Not eligible		Not eligible
2014	J3	3	12	12th	33	4	12	17	29	58	-29	24	1,018	Not eligible	2nd round	Not eligible
2015	J3	3	13	13th	36	7	6	23	24	58	-34	27	919	Not eligible		Not eligible
2016	J3	3	16	16th	30	5	5	20	15	51	-36	20	1,018	Not eligible		Not eligible
2017	J3	3	17	14th	32	8	8	16	41	54	-13	32	951	Not eligible	1st round	Not eligible
2018	J3	3	17	15th	32	8	10	14	40	48	-8	34	1,005	Not eligible	2nd round	Not eligible
2019	J3	3	18	13th	34	12	3	19	53	65	-12	39	1,095	Not eligible		Not eligible
2020 †	J3	3	18	17th	34	5	12	17	37	66	-29	27	623	Not eligible	Did not qualify	Not eligible
2021	J3	3	15	8th	28	11	7	10	31	33	-2	40	1,156	Not eligible	2nd round	Not eligible
2022	J3	3	18	16th	34	8	4	22	25	66	-41	28	1,293	Not eligible	Did not qualify	Not eligible
2023	J3	3	20	12th	38	14	10	14	48	50	-2	52	1,469	Not eligible	Prefectural final	Not eligible
2024	J3	3	20	19th	38	7	11	20	34	64	-30	32	1,557	2nd round	Did not qualify	Not eligible
2025	JFL	4	16	13th	30	7	8	15	17	37	-20	29	1,476	Not eligible	Did not qualify	Not eligible
2026-27	JFL	4	16	TBD	30										TBD	Not eligible

Key

- Pos. = Position in league; P = Games played; W = Games won; D = Games drawn; L = Games lost; F = Goals scored; A = Goals conceded; GD = Goals difference; Pts = Points gained
- Attendance/G = Average home league attendance
- † 2020 season attendance reduced by COVID-19 worldwide pandemic
- Source: J.League Data Site
- Source RSSSF:

== Honours ==
YSCC Yokohama Honours
Honour	No.	Years
Kanagawa Prefecture Division 1	1	2002
Kanagawa Prefectural Football Championship Emperor's Cup Kanagawa Prefectural Qualifiers	9	2002, 2008, 2010, 2011, 2012, 2014, 2017, 2018, 2021
Kanto Soccer League	4	2006, 2009, 2010, 2011
Regional League Promotion Series	1	2011

Kanagawa Prefectural Football Championship
Emperor's Cup Kanagawa Prefectural Qualifiers

== Current squad ==
As of 2 August 2024.

Note: Flags indicate national team as defined under FIFA eligibility rules; some limited exceptions apply. Players may hold more than one non-FIFA nationality.

No.	Pos.	Nation	Player
1	GK	JPN	Ryosuke Sagawa
2	DF	JPN	Minoru Hanafusa
3	DF	JPN	Takuya Fujiwara
4	MF	JPN	Kento Dodate
5	DF	JPN	Haruki Oshima
6	MF	JPN	Diego Taba
7	MF	JPN	Atsushi Kikutani
8	MF	JPN	Yutaro Yanagi
9	FW	JPN	Yusei Kayanuma
10	MF	JPN	Ryotaro Yamamoto
11	FW	JPN	Jorn Pedersen
13	FW	MAS	Luqman Hakim (on loan from Kortrijk)
14	MF	JPN	Ryohei Wakizaka
15	MF	JPN	Yasuto Fujita
17	DF	JPN	Takuma Hashino
18	MF	JPN	Jukiya Fujishima
19	DF	JPN	Shawn Van Eerden (on loan from Yokohama FC)

No.	Pos.	Nation	Player
20	MF	JPN	Yusei Otake
21	GK	JPN	Chris Takahashi
22	MF	JPN	Yushin Otake (on loan from Albirex Niigata)
23	MF	JPN	Hiroto Domoto
24	MF	JPN	Rento Tahara
25	MF	JPN	Shunta Nishiyama
26	DF	JPN	Hiroto Okoshi
27	DF	JPN	Wataru Yamakura
30	MF	JPN	Shuto Kojima
31	GK	JPN	Michiya Okamoto
32	FW	JPN	Koki Matsumura
33	MF	JPN	Rikuto Hashimoto
39	MF	JPN	Koji Okumura
50	MF	JPN	Takahiro Nakazato
67	FW	NGR	Promise Ugochukwu
82	GK	JPN	Naoki Goto (on loan from Tokushima Vortis)

== Coaching staff ==
Position	Staff
Manager	(Japan) Tsuyoshi Omatsu
Assistant manager	(Japan) Taro Sugahara
Athletic performance coach	(Japan) Shuna Matsumoto
First-team coach	(Japan) Ryuji Sueoka (Japan) Sosuke Morito
Goalkeeping coach	(Japan) Kazuyoshi Nishitani
Chief doctor	(Japan) So Kameda
Chief trainer	(Japan) Naoyuki Agatsuma
Doctor	(Japan) Keiichi Yoshi (Japan) Jun Takeda (Japan) Kenji Goto (Japan) Jun Tomura (Japan) Ryosuke Nakajima
Trainer	(Japan) Chikao Sato
Physiotherapist	(Japan) Toshiaki Shibuya
Masseur	(Japan) Hirokazu Ikeda
Conditioning staff & nutritionist	(Japan) Kazuya Okada

== Managerial history ==
Manager	Nationality	Tenure	
Manager	Nationality	Start	Finish
Masahiro Shimoda	Japan	1 November 2006	31 January 2007
Yohei Suzuki	Japan	1 January 2011	31 December 2012
Jun Matsuhisa	Japan	1 January 2013	31 December 2013
Kenji Arima	Japan	1 February 2014	31 January 2016
Yasuhiro Higuchi	Japan	1 February 2016	31 January 2019
Yūki Stalph	Japan	1 February 2019	31 January 2022
Kenji Nakada	Japan	1 February 2022	25 May 2022
Kei Hoshikawa	Japan	26 May 2022	28 August 2023
Kazuki Kuranuki	Japan	30 August 2023	31 January 2025
Hiroaki Nagamine	Japan	1 February 2025	10 July 2025
Yuya Shiga (Interim)	Japan	11 July 2025	17 July 2025
Tsuyoshi Omatsu	Japan	17 July 2025	Present

== Kit evolution ==
Home kits - 1st
2014	2015 - 2016	2017	2018	2019 - 2020
2021	2022	2023	2024	2025 -

Away kits - 2nd
2014	2015 - 2017	2018	2019 - 2020	2021
2022	2023	2024	2025 -	
