= List of J3 League football transfers winter 2017–18 =

This is a list of Japanese football J3 League transfers in the winter transfer window 2017–18 by club.

== Thespakusatsu Gunma ==
In: Note: Flags indicate national team as defined under FIFA eligibility rules; some limited exceptions apply. Players may hold more than one non-FIFA nationality.

No.	Pos.	Nation	Player
1	GK	JPN	Satoshi Tokizawa (from (Japan) FC Gifu)
8	MF	JPN	Koki Kazama (on loan from (Japan) Montedio Yamagata)
10	FW	JPN	Ryuichi Hirashige (from (Japan) Roasso Kumamoto)
13	DF	JPN	Shingo Kukita (from (Japan) Fagiano Okayama)
15	DF	JPN	Toshiki Nakamura (from (Japan) Tonan Maebashi, end of loan)
18	FW	JPN	Yosuke Komuta (from (Japan) Fukushima United FC, end of loan)
20	FW	JPN	Takuya Iwata (from (Japan) SC Sagamihara, end of loan)
21	GK	JPN	Shuhei Matsubara (from (Japan) Kamatamare Sanuki)
22	DF	JPN	Masato Fujiwara (from (Japan) Tonan Maebashi, end of loan)
24	DF	JPN	Shunta Shimura (from (Japan) Tonan Maebashi)
25	FW	JPN	Ayumu Nagato (on loan from (Japan) Montedio Yamagata)
27	FW	JPN	Koki Oshima (on loan from (Japan) Tochigi SC)
39	FW	JPN	Tetsuya Okubo (from (Japan) Yokohama FC)

Out: Note: Flags indicate national team as defined under FIFA eligibility rules; some limited exceptions apply. Players may hold more than one non-FIFA nationality.

No.	Pos.	Nation	Player
1	GK	JPN	Keiki Shimizu (to (Japan) Omiya Ardija, end of loan)
9	MF	JPN	Yuya Yamagishi (to (Japan) FC Gifu)
10	MF	BRA	Matheus (released)
11	FW	JPN	Yuichiro Nagai (to (Japan) Yokohama Fifty Club)
14	FW	JPN	Masatoshi Ishida (to (Japan) Kyoto Sanga, end of loan)
20	MF	KOR	Park Kun (to (South Korea) Bucheon FC 1995)
21	GK	JPN	Yuta Suzuki (retired)
22	MF	JPN	Sho Murata (to (Japan) Tochigi Uva FC)
24	DF	JPN	Yuko Takase (to (Japan) Omiya Ardija, end of loan)
26	MF	JPN	Kazuma Takai (to (Japan) Tokyo Verdy)
33	FW	KOR	Kang Soo-il (to (Thailand) Ratchaburi FC)
35	FW	JPN	Yuta Kobayashi (to (Japan) Tonan Maebashi)
36	DF	KOR	Choi Joon-gi (to (South Korea) Seongnam FC)
40	FW	JPN	Kohei Morita (retired)
41	GK	JPN	Ayumi Niekawa (to (Japan) Jubilo Iwata, end of loan)
43	DF	KOR	Yeo Sung-hae (to (South Korea) Gyeongnam FC)

== Blaublitz Akita ==
In: Note: Flags indicate national team as defined under FIFA eligibility rules; some limited exceptions apply. Players may hold more than one non-FIFA nationality.

No.	Pos.	Nation	Player
1	GK	JPN	Keiki Shimizu (on loan from (Japan) Omiya Ardija)
2	DF	JPN	Kei Omoto (from (Japan) Tochigi SC)
3	DF	JPN	Shuhei Hotta (on loan from (Japan) Ehime FC)
9	FW	JPN	Ryota Nakamura (from (Japan) Azul Claro Numazu)
10	MF	JPN	Hiroyuki Furuta (from (Japan) Zweigen Kanazawa, previously on loan)
13	MF	JPN	Naoto Hiraishi (from (Japan) Fujieda MYFC)
17	DF	KOR	Han Ho-gang (from (Japan) Montedio Yamagata, previously on loan)
18	FW	JPN	Yoshihito Fujita (from (Japan) Shonan Bellmare)
19	FW	JPN	Tsubasa Yoshihira (on loan from (Japan) Oita Trinita)
22	DF	JPN	Jun Sonoda (from (Japan) Roasso Kumamoto)

Out: Note: Flags indicate national team as defined under FIFA eligibility rules; some limited exceptions apply. Players may hold more than one non-FIFA nationality.

No.	Pos.	Nation	Player
1	GK	JPN	Akihito Ozawa (to (Japan) Nagano Parceiro)
2	MF	JPN	Tatsuro Inui (to (Cambodia) Nagaworld FC)
6	DF	JPN	Shingo Arizono (to (Japan) Giravanz Kitakyushu)
13	FW	JPN	Ginji Aki (on loan to (Japan) ReinMeer Aomori)
17	FW	JPN	Toshiki Sakai (released)
18	MF	JPN	Keisuke Ono (on loan to (Japan) Amitie SC Kyoto)
32	DF	JPN	Takahiro Urashima (to (Japan) Fujieda MYFC)
33	FW	JPN	Takunosuke Funakawa (to (Japan) Kochi United SC)
36	MF	JPN	Ryoto Higa (released)
43	DF	JPN	Kohei Shimoda (retired)

== Azul Claro Numazu ==
In: Note: Flags indicate national team as defined under FIFA eligibility rules; some limited exceptions apply. Players may hold more than one non-FIFA nationality.

No.	Pos.	Nation	Player
4	DF	JPN	Genki Miyaichi (on loan from (Japan) Matsumoto Yamaga)
5	DF	JPN	Shusuke Sakamoto (from (Japan) Nara Club)
8	DF	JPN	Keisuke Minegishi (from (Japan) Zweigen Kanazawa)
9	FW	JPN	Naoki Tanaka (from (Japan) FC Osaka)
14	MF	JPN	Makoto Fukoin (from (Japan) SC Sagamihara)
16	GK	JPN	Ayumi Niekawa (on loan from (Japan) Júbilo Iwata)
19	FW	JPN	Masatoshi Ishida (on loan from (Japan) Kyoto Sanga)
21	DF	JPN	Norimasa Atsutaka (from Komazawa University)
24	DF	JPN	Kazuya Sunamori (from (Japan) Kamatamare Sanuki)
26	FW	JPN	Yoshiki Ota (on loan from (Japan) Matsumoto Yamaga)
28	DF	JPN	Takuma Nakajima (from Tokyo University of Agriculture)
40	MF	JPN	Eisuke Atsumi (from Chuo University)
47	MF	JPN	Yasuhito Tomita (from (Japan) Zweigen Kanazawa)

Out: Note: Flags indicate national team as defined under FIFA eligibility rules; some limited exceptions apply. Players may hold more than one non-FIFA nationality.

No.	Pos.	Nation	Player
4	DF	JPN	Shun Tanaka (to (Japan) Grulla Morioka)
5	DF	JPN	Masahiro Baba (released)
7	MF	JPN	Masaya Suzuki (to (Japan) Toho Titanium SC)
8	MF	JPN	Ryoichi Kawazu (to (Japan) Grulla Morioka)
9	FW	JPN	Ryota Nakamura (to (Japan) Blaublitz Akita)
13	FW	JPN	Jun Suzuki (to (Japan) Tokyo 23 FC)
14	MF	JPN	Tomoyuki Shiraishi (to (Japan) Grulla Morioka)
16	MF	JPN	Masanobu Komaki (to (Japan) Roasso Kumamoto, end of loan)
19	FW	JPN	Takuma Sonoda (to (Japan) Tokushima Vortis)
20	GK	JPN	Ryo Ishii (to (Japan) Mito HollyHock, end of loan)
29	FW	JPN	Ryota Watanabe (to (Japan) Fujieda MYFC)
32	MF	JPN	Kohei Kurata (to (Japan) Saurcos Fukui)

== Kagoshima United FC ==
In: Note: Flags indicate national team as defined under FIFA eligibility rules; some limited exceptions apply. Players may hold more than one non-FIFA nationality.

No.	Pos.	Nation	Player
4	DF	JPN	Kyohei Kuroki (from (Japan) Oita Trinita)
5	DF	JPN	Ryo Hiraide (from (Japan) Kataller Toyama)
9	FW	BRA	Alex (from (Japan) Fukushima United FC)
10	MF	JPN	Masaki Sakamoto (from (Japan) Cerezo Osaka)
13	GK	KOR	Ahn Joon-soo (on loan from (Japan) Cerezo Osaka)
15	DF	JPN	Noritaka Fujisawa (from (Japan) FC Ryukyu)
19	FW	BRA	Thiago Quirino (from (Brazil) Anapolis FC)
26	MF	JPN	Soichi Tanaka (from (Japan) Fagiano Okayama)
30	FW	JPN	Yusei Kayanuma (from (Japan) Kataller Toyama)

Out: Note: Flags indicate national team as defined under FIFA eligibility rules; some limited exceptions apply. Players may hold more than one non-FIFA nationality.

No.	Pos.	Nation	Player
1	GK	JPN	Shunsuke Ueda (to (Japan) Saurcos Fukui)
4	DF	JPN	Ryuhei Niwa (to (Japan) SC Sagamihara)
5	MF	JPN	Wataru Inoue (released)
9	FW	JPN	Noriaki Fujimoto (to (Japan) Oita Trinita)
13	FW	JPN	Yuya Yamada (retired)
15	MF	JPN	Hirotaka Uchizono (to (Japan) Tegevajaro Miyazaki)
18	DF	JPN	Mitsuhiro Seki (to (Japan) Fujieda MYFC)
26	DF	JPN	Shogo Tsukada (to (Japan) Verspah Oita)
28	DF	JPN	Masafumi Terada (on loan to (Japan) Artista Tomi)
40	DF	JPN	Taikai Uemoto (retired)
47	GK	JPN	Niall Killoran (to (Japan) FC TIAMO Hirakata)
—	FW	MKD	Dorian Babunski (to (Japan) Machida Zelvia, end of loan)
—	FW	JPN	Takayuki Fujii (on loan to (Japan) Nara Club)

== Nagano Parceiro ==
In: Note: Flags indicate national team as defined under FIFA eligibility rules; some limited exceptions apply. Players may hold more than one non-FIFA nationality.

No.	Pos.	Nation	Player
8	MF	JPN	Shuto Kawai (from (Japan) Gainare Tottori)
9	FW	JPN	Tomohiro Tsuda (from (Japan) Yokohama FC)
18	DF	JPN	Kyohei Uchida (from (Japan) Kyoto Sanga)
21	GK	JPN	Akihito Ozawa (from (Japan) Blaublitz Akita)
23	MF	JPN	Yu Doan (from Biwako Seikei Sport College)
27	FW	JPN	Reo Takeshita (from Kansai University)
28	MF	JPN	Ryo Matsumura (from (Japan) Vissel Kobe)
30	FW	JPN	Hiroki Bandai (from (Japan) Mito HollyHock, previously on loan)

Out: Note: Flags indicate national team as defined under FIFA eligibility rules; some limited exceptions apply. Players may hold more than one non-FIFA nationality.

No.	Pos.	Nation	Player
8	MF	JPN	Tetsuya Kanno (to (Japan) Nara Club)
9	FW	JPN	Shogo Shiozawa (to (Japan) Artista Tomi)
11	DF	JPN	Akihiro Sakata (to (Japan) Fukushima United FC)
18	FW	JPN	Tomoyuki Arata (retired)
21	GK	JPN	Dai Takeda (to (Japan) Artista Tomi)
23	MF	JPN	Masaya Nozaki (to (Japan) ReinMeer Aomori)
27	DF	JPN	Satoru Oki (to (Japan) Tokyo Verdy, end of loan)
28	FW	JPN	Hidemasa Kobayashi (released)

== FC Ryukyu ==
In: Note: Flags indicate national team as defined under FIFA eligibility rules; some limited exceptions apply. Players may hold more than one non-FIFA nationality.

No.	Pos.	Nation	Player
5	DF	JPN	Shuhei Tokumoto (from Josai International University)
6	MF	JPN	Masayoshi Takayanagi (from (Japan) VONDS Ichihara)
8	MF	JPN	Hayata Komatsu (from (Japan) YSCC Yokohama)
11	FW	JPN	Ryuji Bando (from (Japan) Omiya Ardija)
16	MF	JPN	Yuichiro Edamoto (from (Japan) Fujieda MYFC)
18	MF	JPN	Yuki Miyauchi (from Ryutsu Keizai University)
21	GK	JPN	Keisuke Ono (from (Japan) Briobecca Urayasu)
23	DF	JPN	Daichi Okumiya (from (Japan) FC Seriole)
24	MF	JPN	Sho Otsuka (from Kwansei Gakuin University)
25	MF	KOR	Kim Song-sun (from Korea University)
29	FW	NOR	Fadel Karbon (from (Norway) Lyn Fotball)

Out: Note: Flags indicate national team as defined under FIFA eligibility rules; some limited exceptions apply. Players may hold more than one non-FIFA nationality.

No.	Pos.	Nation	Player
5	MF	KOR	Kang Juk-wang (released)
6	MF	JPN	Keisuke Tanabe (to (Japan) Roasso Kumamoto)
8	DF	JPN	Noritaka Fujisawa (to (Japan) Kagoshima United FC)
11	FW	JPN	Ryuji Saito (to (Japan) Kataller Toyama)
13	DF	JPN	Katsuhiro Hamada (released)
16	DF	JPN	Tatsuro Yamauchi (to (Japan) Okinawa SV)
18	FW	JPN	Hiroki Maeda (to (Japan) Giravanz Kitakyushu)
20	FW	JPN	Desheun Ryo Yamakawa (released)
21	GK	JPN	Taisuke Konno (released)
24	DF	KOR	Kim Hyung-beom (on loan to (Japan) Briobecca Urayasu)
25	DF	JPN	Yu Tamagawa (released)
28	MF	JPN	Takumi Nagura (to (Japan) V-Varen Nagasaki)
29	GK	KOR	Lee Kyung-tae (to (Japan) Fagiano Okayama, end of loan)
30	MF	JPN	Keita Tanaka (to (Japan) Mito HollyHock, end of loan)

== Fujieda MYFC ==
In: Note: Flags indicate national team as defined under FIFA eligibility rules; some limited exceptions apply. Players may hold more than one non-FIFA nationality.

No.	Pos.	Nation	Player
1	GK	JPN	Shuhei Kawata (on loan from (Japan) Tochigi SC)
4	DF	JPN	Takashi Akiyama (from (Japan) Gainare Tottori)
8	MF	JPN	Ryota Iwabuchi (from (Japan) Grulla Morioka)
9	FW	JPN	Kenzo Taniguchi (from (Japan) Grulla Morioka)
14	MF	JPN	Takuya Kakine (from (Japan) Grulla Morioka)
15	MF	JPN	Yuji Yabu (from (Japan) V-Varen Nagasaki)
17	DF	JPN	Shinya Awatari (from (Japan) Zweigen Kanazawa)
18	DF	JPN	Takamasa Taneoka (from (Japan) Tochigi SC)
20	DF	JPN	Takaaki Kinoshita (on loan from (Japan) Mito HollyHock)
22	DF	JPN	Ryusei Saito (from (Japan) Kyoto Sanga)
23	MF	JPN	Masanobu Komaki (from (Japan) Roasso Kumamoto)
24	DF	JPN	Yuya Mitsunaga (from (Japan) Roasso Kumamoto)
25	DF	JPN	Seiji Kawakami (on loan from (Japan) Tochigi SC)
26	DF	JPN	Takahiro Urashima (from (Japan) Fujieda MYFC)
27	DF	JPN	Mitsuhiro Seki (from (Japan) Kagoshima United FC)
28	FW	JPN	Junki Endo (from (Japan) Machida Zelvia)
29	FW	JPN	Ryota Watanabe (from (Japan) Azul Claro Numazu)
30	GK	JPN	Daichi Sugimoto (from (Japan) Gainare Tottori)
31	GK	PRK	Lee Che-gun (from (Japan) FC Korea)
32	MF	JPN	Yuta Inagaki (from (Japan) MIO Biwako Shiga)
33	DF	PRK	Kim Song-gi (from (Japan) Machida Zelvia)

Out: Note: Flags indicate national team as defined under FIFA eligibility rules; some limited exceptions apply. Players may hold more than one non-FIFA nationality.

No.	Pos.	Nation	Player
1	GK	JPN	Takanori Miyake (to (Japan) Nara Club)
4	DF	JPN	Ryuji Ito (to (Japan) VONDS Ichihara)
6	DF	JPN	Tadayo Fukuo (retired)
7	MF	JPN	Yuichiro Edamoto (to (Japan) FC Ryukyu)
8	FW	JPN	Keisuke Endo (to (Japan) Kataller Toyama)
9	FW	JPN	Ryota Doi (to (Japan) Arterivo Wakayama)
11	FW	CAM	Chan Vathanaka (released)
13	FW	JPN	Hirochika Miyoshi (retired)
14	MF	JPN	Naoto Hiraishi (to (Japan) Blaublitz Akita)
17	MF	JPN	Hirohito Shinohara (to (Japan) Verspah Oita)
18	MF	JPN	Yuki Hatanaka (to (Japan) Verspah Oita)
22	DF	JPN	Ryosuke Hisadomi (to (Japan) Tochigi SC)
23	FW	JPN	Masato Sasaki (to (Japan) MIO Biwako Shiga)
24	DF	KOR	Kwon Young-ho (released)
26	GK	JPN	Junto Taguchi (to (Japan) Yokohama F. Marinos, end of loan)
29	DF	JPN	Nobuyuki Kawashima (to (Japan) Giravanz Kitakyushu)
31	MF	JPN	Sho Aoki (released)
33	DF	JPN	Jun Sonoda (to (Japan) Roasso Kumamoto, end of loan)
35	DF	JPN	Makito Ito (to (Japan) Mito HollyHock, end of loan)
—	DF	JPN	Shota Fujisaki (to (Japan) Amitie SC Kyoto, previously on loan)
—	FW	JPN	Hiroki Waki (to (Japan) Amitie SC Kyoto, previously on loan)

== Kataller Toyama ==
In: Note: Flags indicate national team as defined under FIFA eligibility rules; some limited exceptions apply. Players may hold more than one non-FIFA nationality.

No.	Pos.	Nation	Player
4	DF	JPN	Shuma Kusumoto (from (Japan) Yokohama FC)
5	DF	JPN	Junya Imase (on loan from (Japan) Mito HollyHock)
6	MF	JPN	Yuto Sashinami (on loan from (Japan) Vegalta Sendai)
7	MF	JPN	Yoji Sasaki (from (Japan) Tokushima Vortis, previously on loan)
8	FW	JPN	Keisuke Endo (from (Japan) Fujieda MYFC)
10	MF	JPN	Mizuki Arai (from (Japan) SC Sagamihara)
11	FW	JPN	Ryuji Saito (from (Japan) FC Ryukyu)
14	MF	JPN	Chie Edoojon Kawakami (on loan from (Japan) Tokushima Vortis)
15	MF	BRA	Lucas Daubermann (from (Brazil) Madureira EC)
16	DF	JPN	Kyohei Yumisaki (from (Japan) Giravanz Kitakyushu)
17	FW	JPN	Shuto Inaba (from Albirex Niigata Singapore)
18	FW	JPN	Ryo Takiya (from (Japan) FC Gifu)
21	GK	JPN	Gakuji Ota (on loan from (Japan) Tokyo Verdy)
24	MF	JPN	Yota Maejima (on loan from (Japan) Yokohama FC)
28	DF	JPN	Kenshiro Tanioku (from (Japan) Matsumoto Yamaga)
39	DF	JPN	Kazuki Sato (from (Japan) Mito HollyHock, previously on loan)

Out: Note: Flags indicate national team as defined under FIFA eligibility rules; some limited exceptions apply. Players may hold more than one non-FIFA nationality.

No.	Pos.	Nation	Player
1	GK	JPN	Tatsumi Iida (retired)
4	MF	JPN	Takahiro Kuniyoshi (released)
5	DF	JPN	Ryo Hiraide (to (Japan) Kagoshima United FC)
6	DF	JPN	Tatsunori Yamagata (retired)
7	MF	JPN	Yuki Kitai (to (Japan) SC Sagamihara)
8	MF	JPN	Ryo Kubota (to (Japan) Ventforet Kofu)
10	MF	JPN	Yu Eto (retired)
11	FW	BRA	Pablo (to (Brazil) Gremio Osasco Audax, end of loan)
16	FW	KOR	Han Seung-hyeong (to (Japan) Matsumoto Yamaga, end of loan)
17	MF	JPN	Keisuke Kimoto (retired)
18	DF	JPN	Masaki Tozaki (released)
23	FW	JPN	Yusei Kayanuma (to (Japan) Kagoshima United FC)
24	MF	JPN	Ryuki Nishimuro (to (Japan) Verspah Oita)
25	MF	JPN	Haruki Umemura (to (Japan) Maruyasu Miyazaki)
29	FW	BRA	Rodrigo Cabeca (released)
30	DF	JPN	Tetsushi Kondo (to (Japan) Fagiano Okayama, end of loan)
45	FW	JPN	Ryuichi Hirashige (to (Japan) Roasso Kumamoto, end of loan)
—	DF	JPN	Genki Ishisaka (to (Japan) ReinMeer Aomori)
—	FW	JPN	Tomoya Nakanishi (to (Japan) Verspah Oita)

== Giravanz Kitakyushu ==
In: Note: Flags indicate national team as defined under FIFA eligibility rules; some limited exceptions apply. Players may hold more than one non-FIFA nationality.

No.	Pos.	Nation	Player
1	GK	JPN	Norihiro Yamagishi (from (Japan) Montedio Yamagata, previously on loan)
2	DF	JPN	Shingo Arizono (from (Japan) Blaublitz Akita)
4	MF	JPN	Ryu Kawakami (from (Japan) Fukushima United FC)
5	MF	JPN	Tatsuya Onodera (from (Japan) V-Varen Nagasaki, previously on loan)
13	DF	JPN	Itsuki Urata (from (Japan) JEF United Chiba, previously on loan)
15	DF	JPN	Wataru Noguchi (from University of Tsukuba)
16	FW	JPN	Sota Sato (from Nissho Gakuen High School)
22	MF	JPN	Soya Fujiwara (from Hannan University)
24	DF	JPN	Nobuyuki Kawashima (from (Japan) Fujieda MYFC)
25	FW	JPN	Hiroki Maeda (from (Japan) FC Ryukyu)
30	DF	JPN	Taisuke Muramatsu (from (Japan) Shimizu S-Pulse)

Out: Note: Flags indicate national team as defined under FIFA eligibility rules; some limited exceptions apply. Players may hold more than one non-FIFA nationality.

No.	Pos.	Nation	Player
2	DF	JPN	Naoya Ishigami (to (Japan) FC Maruyasu Okazaki)
5	DF	JPN	Kazuya Maeda (retired)
6	DF	JPN	Hiroyuki Nishijima (retired)
8	MF	JPN	Tsuyoshi Hakkaku (retired)
9	FW	JPN	Shoma Mizunaga (to (Japan) Zweigen Kanazawa, end of loan)
15	MF	JPN	Daisuke Kanzaki (retired)
16	DF	JPN	Kyohei Yumisaki (to (Japan) Kataller Toyama)
22	MF	JPN	Kenta Yamafuji (to (Japan) Zweigen Kanazawa, end of loan)
25	FW	JPN	Rui Komatsu (retired)
30	MF	CHN	Sun Jungang (to (China) Shanghai SIPG, end of loan)
41	DF	JPN	Ryosuke Tone (to (Japan) Oita Trinita)
—	DF	JPN	Shoto Suzuki (to (Japan) Roasso Kumamoto, end of loan)
—	DF	JPN	Yukiya Kajiwara (released)

== Fukushima United FC ==
In: Note: Flags indicate national team as defined under FIFA eligibility rules; some limited exceptions apply. Players may hold more than one non-FIFA nationality.

No.	Pos.	Nation	Player
3	DF	JPN	Akihiro Sakata (from (Japan) Nagano Parceiro)
4	DF	JPN	Hirokazu Usami (from (Japan) Montedio Yamagata)
9	FW	JPN	Hayate Take (from Waseda University)
11	FW	JPN	Shota Tamura (from (Japan) Shonan Bellmare, previously on loan)
19	FW	JPN	Hibiki Wada (on loan from (Japan) Shonan Bellmare)
23	GK	JPN	Go Ito (from (Japan) Shonan Bellmare, previously on loan)
25	DF	JPN	Junya Higashi (on loan from (Japan) Vissel Kobe)
27	FW	JPN	Masaki Ikeda (from Higashiyama High School)
28	GK	JPN	Ryo Ishii (on loan from (Japan) Mito HollyHock)
29	MF	JPN	Yuji Wakasa (from Nippon Sport Science University)
34	DF	JPN	Kota Teramae (from Kanagawa University)
41	MF	JPN	Shohei Kawakami (from Tokyo International University)

Out: Note: Flags indicate national team as defined under FIFA eligibility rules; some limited exceptions apply. Players may hold more than one non-FIFA nationality.

No.	Pos.	Nation	Player
3	DF	JPN	Takuya Osanai (to (Japan) ReinMeer Aomori)
4	MF	JPN	Ryu Kawakami (to (Japan) Giravanz Kitakyushu)
5	MF	JPN	Takumi Watanabe (retired)
9	FW	BRA	Alex (to (Japan) Kagoshima United FC)
10	MF	KOR	Kim Kong-chyong (retired)
18	DF	JPN	Yosuke Komuta (to (Japan) Thespakusatsu Gunma, end of loan)
20	MF	BRA	Renan (released)
21	GK	JPN	Dai Okada (retired)
24	MF	JPN	Shota Hasunuma (on loan to (Japan) ReinMeer Aomori)
25	DF	JPN	Kento Sugino (retired)
34	GK	JPN	Tomoyasu Naito (to (Japan) Toho Titanium FC)
43	MF	JPN	Takaaki Shichi (to (Japan) Matsumoto Yamaga, end of loan)
—	FW	JPN	Junya Kuno (retired)

== SC Sagamihara ==
In: Note: Flags indicate national team as defined under FIFA eligibility rules; some limited exceptions apply. Players may hold more than one non-FIFA nationality.

No.	Pos.	Nation	Player
2	DF	JPN	Ryuhei Niwa (from (Japan) Kagoshima United FC)
7	MF	JPN	Yuki Kitai (from (Japan) Kataller Toyama)
8	MF	JPN	Tatsuya Yazawa (from (Japan) Machida Zelvia)
14	FW	BRA	Tiquinho (from (Brazil) Cruzeiro)
16	GK	KOR	Kim Hyun-sung (from (South Korea) Daegu FC)
18	MF	JPN	Sho Naruoka (from (Japan) Albirex Niigata)
19	FW	JPN	Yosei Otsu (from (Japan) Oita Trinita)
22	DF	JPN	Masato Furukawa (from Tokyo International University)
26	DF	JPN	Ren Kano (from (Japan) Tochigi Uva FC)
29	GK	JPN	Yuto Tanaka (from Toin University of Yokohama)

Out: Note: Flags indicate national team as defined under FIFA eligibility rules; some limited exceptions apply. Players may hold more than one non-FIFA nationality.

No.	Pos.	Nation	Player
4	DF	JPN	Naoya Okane (to (Japan) Okinawa SV)
6	DF	JPN	Naoto Kidoku (to (Thailand) Cha Choeng Sao FC)
10	MF	JPN	Ryo Iida (to (Japan) FC TIAMO Hirakata)
14	MF	JPN	Makoto Fukoin (to (Japan) Azul Claro Numazu)
16	GK	JPN	Kaijiro Fujiyoshi (to (Japan) Nara Club)
26	DF	JPN	Noriyuki Ishigami (to (Japan) Amitie SC Kyoto)
28	FW	KOR	Go Daimu (released)
29	DF	JPN	Takuya Iwata (to (Japan) Thespakusatsu Gunma, end of loan)
30	MF	JPN	Mizuki Arai (to (Japan) Kataller Toyama)

== YSCC Yokohama ==
In: Note: Flags indicate national team as defined under FIFA eligibility rules; some limited exceptions apply. Players may hold more than one non-FIFA nationality.

No.	Pos.	Nation	Player
4	MF	JPN	Kento Dodate (from (Japan) Grulla Morioka)
11	MF	JPN	Kyoga Nakamura (from (Japan) JEF United Chiba, previously on loan)
17	MF	JPN	Ryosuke Kawano (from (Japan) Verspah Oita)
19	DF	JPN	Keito Yamauchi (promoted from reserves team)
20	FW	JPN	Kohei Shin (from Tokyo International University)
21	MF	JPN	Shoto Ashino (promoted from reserves team)
22	DF	JPN	Toshiya Omi (from Senshu University)
23	MF	JPN	Naoto Misawa (from Senshu University)
26	MF	JPN	Yuta Sato (from Senshu University)
27	MF	JPN	Yutaro Yanagi (from Meikai University)
29	FW	JPN	Hayato Asakawa (from Toin University of Yokohama)
30	GK	JPN	Keito Furushima (from Tokyo International University)

Out: Note: Flags indicate national team as defined under FIFA eligibility rules; some limited exceptions apply. Players may hold more than one non-FIFA nationality.

No.	Pos.	Nation	Player
4	FW	JPN	Kosuke Matsuda (retired)
7	MF	JPN	Masaya Yamamoto (to (Japan) ReinMeer Aomori)
8	MF	JPN	Masato Yamazaki (to (Japan) ReinMeer Aomori)
16	GK	POL	Filip Wichman (released)
21	MF	JPN	Kensho Ogasawara (released)
24	DF	JPN	Hiroki Okuda (to (Japan) Gainare Tottori)
26	DF	JPN	Hiroya Iwakabe (released)
27	MF	JPN	Hayata Komatsu (to (Japan) FC Ryukyu)

== Grulla Morioka ==
In: Note: Flags indicate national team as defined under FIFA eligibility rules; some limited exceptions apply. Players may hold more than one non-FIFA nationality.

No.	Pos.	Nation	Player
3	DF	JPN	Tomoya Fukuda (from (Japan) Machida Zelvia, previously on loan)
5	DF	JPN	Katsuhisa Inamori (from (Japan) Gainare Tottori)
6	MF	JPN	Ryoichi Kawazu (from (Japan) Azul Claro Numazu)
9	FW	JPN	Kohei Takayanagi (from (Japan) Iwaki FC)
14	MF	JPN	Shota Yomesaka (from (Japan) Gamba Osaka)
16	DF	JPN	Shun Tanaka (from (Japan) Azul Claro Numazu)
18	FW	JPN	Tsuyoshi Miyaichi (on loan from (Japan) Shonan Bellmare)
19	MF	JPN	Tomoyuki Shiraishi (from (Japan) Azul Claro Numazu)
20	MF	JPN	Kazuki Egashira (on loan from (Japan) Oita Trinita)
23	DF	JPN	Kengo Ota (from Osaka Univ. of Health and Sport Sciences)
25	FW	JPN	Kaito Taniguchi (from Gifu Keizai University)
26	MF	JPN	Riku Yamada (on loan from (Japan) Omiya Ardija)
29	FW	JPN	Takumu Fujinuma (on loan from (Japan) Omiya Ardija)

Out: Note: Flags indicate national team as defined under FIFA eligibility rules; some limited exceptions apply. Players may hold more than one non-FIFA nationality.

No.	Pos.	Nation	Player
5	DF	JPN	Daichi Hakkaku (released)
9	FW	PRK	Kim Hong-yeon (to (Japan) Vanraure Hachinohe)
11	FW	JPN	Kenzo Taniguchi (to (Japan) Fujieda MYFC)
14	MF	JPN	Yusuke Hayashi (retired)
16	MF	JPN	Eijiro Mori (retired)
19	MF	JPN	Takuya Kakine (to (Japan) Fujieda MYFC)
20	MF	JPN	Jo Inoue (to (Japan) Cobaltore Onagawa)
23	DF	JPN	So Morita (to (Japan) Tochigi Uva FC)
25	MF	JPN	Kento Dodate (to (Japan) YSCC Yokohama)
27	DF	CHN	Yang Fan (to (China) Shanghai SIPG, end of loan)
41	MF	JPN	Ryota Iwabuchi (to (Japan) Fujieda MYFC)

== Gainare Tottori ==
In: Note: Flags indicate national team as defined under FIFA eligibility rules; some limited exceptions apply. Players may hold more than one non-FIFA nationality.

No.	Pos.	Nation	Player
1	GK	JPN	Takashi Kitano (from (Japan) Yokohama FC)
4	DF	JPN	Kentaro Kai (on loan from (Japan) FC Gifu)
7	MF	JPN	Masataka Kani (from (Japan) Kawasaki Frontale)
8	MF	BRA	Fernandinho (from (Brazil) Ferroviária)
9	FW	BRA	Leonardo (from (Brazil) Santos FC)
11	MF	BRA	Vitor Gabriel (from (Brazil) Santos FC)
15	MF	JPN	Yo Uematsu (from (Japan) Briobecca Urayasu)
16	MF	JPN	Yusuke Hoshino (from (Japan) Zweigen Kanazawa)
19	MF	JPN	Tomomitsu Kobayashi (from Yamanashi Gakuin University)
20	MF	JPN	Sho Matsumoto (from (Japan) Saurcos Fukui)
24	DF	JPN	Hiroki Okuda (from (Japan) YSCC Yokohama)

Out: Note: Flags indicate national team as defined under FIFA eligibility rules; some limited exceptions apply. Players may hold more than one non-FIFA nationality.

No.	Pos.	Nation	Player
6	MF	JPN	Kosei Ishigami (to (Japan) AIK Ibaraki Hitachi Sports Club)
7	MF	JPN	Ryuji Hirota (to (Japan) Renofa Yamaguchi)
8	MF	JPN	Shuto Kawai (to (Japan) Nagano Parceiro)
9	FW	JPN	Masaru Kurotsu (to (Japan) J.FC Miyazaki)
15	DF	JPN	Katsuhisa Inamori (to (Japan) Grulla Morioka)
17	DF	JPN	Takashi Akiyama (to (Japan) Fujieda MYFC)
18	FW	JPN	Daiki Numa (to (Japan) Kyoto Sanga, end of loan)
19	DF	JPN	Shu Kameshima (to (Japan) Tokyo 23 FC)
24	DF	JPN	Yuya Nishijima (released)
26	MF	JPN	Taisei Isoe (on loan to (Japan) Matsue City FC)
28	DF	JPN	Junji Yamamichi (to (Japan) Honda Lock SC)
33	GK	JPN	Takuya Sugimoto (to (Japan) Fujieda MYFC)
40	DF	JPN	Yosuke Kataoka (retired)
48	FW	JPN	Shunsuke Maeda (to (Japan) Okinawa SV)
