= 2018 Fujieda MYFC season =

Fujieda MYFC
2018 season
- Manager: Atsuto Oishi; Nobuhiro Ishizaki
- Stadium: Fujieda Soccer Stadium
- J3 League: 16th
Home colours	Away colours

2018 Fujieda MYFC season.

== Squad ==
As of 1 February 2018. Note: Flags indicate national team as defined under FIFA eligibility rules; some limited exceptions apply. Players may hold more than one non-FIFA nationality.

No.	Pos.	Nation	Player
1	GK	JPN	Shuhei Kawata (on loan from Tochigi SC)
3	DF	JPN	Yohei Nishimura
4	DF	JPN	Takashi Akiyama
5	DF	JPN	Daiki Asada
6	MF	JPN	Ryosuke Kakigi
7	MF	JPN	Taisuke Mizuno
8	DF	JPN	Ryota Iwabuchi
9	FW	JPN	Kenzo Taniguchi
10	MF	JPN	Nozomi Osako
11	MF	JPN	Kohei Kitagawa
13	MF	JPN	Ryuto Otake
14	MF	JPN	Takuya Kakine
15	MF	JPN	Yuji Yabu
16	MF	JPN	Kota Sameshima
17	DF	JPN	Shinya Awatari
18	DF	JPN	Takamasa Taneoka

No.	Pos.	Nation	Player
19	MF	JPN	Ryosuke Ochi
20	DF	JPN	Takaaki Kinoshita (on loan from Mito HollyHock)
21	GK	JPN	Shun Sato
22	FW	JPN	Ryusei Saito
23	MF	JPN	Masanobu Komaki
24	DF	JPN	Yuya Mitsunaga
25	DF	JPN	Seiji Kawakami (on loan from Tochigi SC)
26	DF	JPN	Takahiro Urashima
27	DF	JPN	Mitsuhiro Seki
28	MF	JPN	Junki Endo
29	FW	JPN	Ryota Watanabe
30	GK	JPN	Takuya Sugimoto
31	GK	PRK	Sho Aoki
32	MF	JPN	Yuta Inagaki
33	DF	PRK	Kim Song-gi

== J3 League ==
Match	Date	Team	Score	Team	Venue	Attendance
1	2018.03.10	Fujieda MYFC	1-0	AC Nagano Parceiro	Fujieda Soccer Stadium	1,837
2	2018.03.17	Kataller Toyama	2-1	Fujieda MYFC	Toyama Stadium	2,435
3	2018.03.21	Fujieda MYFC	1-2	Giravanz Kitakyushu	Fujieda Soccer Stadium	508
4	2018.03.25	Kagoshima United FC	1-2	Fujieda MYFC	Kagoshima Kamoike Stadium	4,237
5	2018.04.01	Gamba Osaka U-23	4-1	Fujieda MYFC	Panasonic Stadium Suita	1,398
6	2018.04.08	Fujieda MYFC	0-0	Gainare Tottori	Fujieda Soccer Stadium	873
7	2018.04.15	Thespakusatsu Gunma	2-1	Fujieda MYFC	Shoda Shoyu Stadium Gunma	2,458
8	2018.04.29	Fukushima United FC	2-0	Fujieda MYFC	Toho Stadium	1,253
9	2018.05.03	Fujieda MYFC	0-1	Azul Claro Numazu	Fujieda Soccer Stadium	2,592
10	2018.05.06	Fujieda MYFC	2-1	YSCC Yokohama	Fujieda Soccer Stadium	1,256
11	2018.05.20	Grulla Morioka	0-4	Fujieda MYFC	Iwagin Stadium	1,194
12	2018.06.02	Fujieda MYFC	2-1	SC Sagamihara	Fujieda Soccer Stadium	1,356
14	2018.06.16	Fujieda MYFC	0-1	Blaublitz Akita	Fujieda Soccer Stadium	891
15	2018.06.23	Cerezo Osaka U-23	1-2	Fujieda MYFC	Kincho Stadium	710
16	2018.06.30	Fujieda MYFC	1-1	FC Tokyo U-23	Fujieda Soccer Stadium	1,064
17	2018.07.07	FC Ryukyu	3-0	Fujieda MYFC	Okinawa Athletic Park Stadium	7,289
19	2018.07.21	Fujieda MYFC	0-0	Kataller Toyama	Fujieda Soccer Stadium	1,263
20	2018.08.26	Blaublitz Akita	4-0	Fujieda MYFC	Akigin Stadium	1,625
21	2018.09.02	Fujieda MYFC	0-1	FC Ryukyu	Fujieda Soccer Stadium	977
22	2018.09.09	AC Nagano Parceiro	4-0	Fujieda MYFC	Nagano U Stadium	2,797
23	2018.09.16	Fujieda MYFC	1-2	Cerezo Osaka U-23	Fujieda Soccer Stadium	907
24	2018.09.22	Azul Claro Numazu	2-1	Fujieda MYFC	Ashitaka Park Stadium	2,502
25	2018.09.29	Giravanz Kitakyushu	1-1	Fujieda MYFC	Mikuni World Stadium Kitakyushu	2,320
26	2018.10.07	Fujieda MYFC	2-1	Grulla Morioka	Fujieda Soccer Stadium	876
27	2018.10.13	Fujieda MYFC	2-1	Gamba Osaka U-23	Fujieda Soccer Stadium	945
28	2018.10.20	YSCC Yokohama	1-3	Fujieda MYFC	NHK Spring Mitsuzawa Football Stadium	656
29	2018.10.28	FC Tokyo U-23	2-1	Fujieda MYFC	Ajinomoto Field Nishigaoka	1,620
30	2018.11.03	Fujieda MYFC	1-2	Fukushima United FC	Fujieda Soccer Stadium	1,090
31	2018.11.11	SC Sagamihara	1-0	Fujieda MYFC	Sagamihara Gion Stadium	3,132
32	2018.11.17	Fujieda MYFC	0-2	Kagoshima United FC	Fujieda Soccer Stadium	2,321
33	2018.11.24	Fujieda MYFC	1-0	Thespakusatsu Gunma	Fujieda Soccer Stadium	1,604
34	2018.12.02	Gainare Tottori	2-1	Fujieda MYFC	Tottori Bank Bird Stadium	2,609
