= 2018 Giravanz Kitakyushu season =

Giravanz Kitakyushu
2018 season
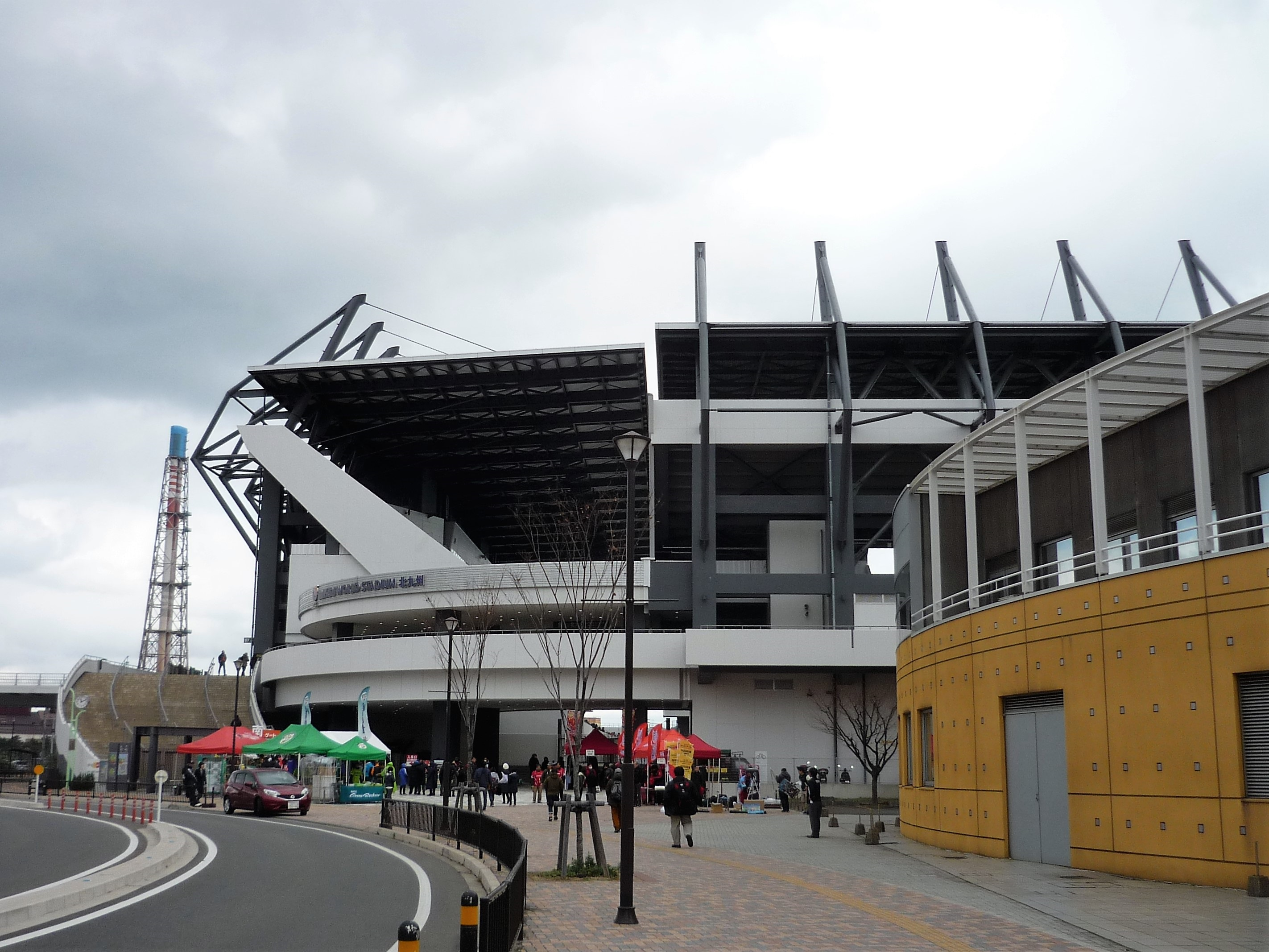
- Manager: Hitoshi Morishita; Tetsuji Hashiratani
- Stadium: Mikuni World Stadium Kitakyushu
- J3 League: 17th
Home colours	Away colours

2018 Giravanz Kitakyushu season.

== Squad ==
As of February 1, 2018.

Note: Flags indicate national team as defined under FIFA eligibility rules; some limited exceptions apply. Players may hold more than one non-FIFA nationality.

No.	Pos.	Nation	Player
1	GK	JPN	Norihiro Yamagishi
2	DF	JPN	Shingo Arizono
3	DF	JPN	Kenta Fukumori
4	DF	JPN	Ryu Kawakami
5	MF	JPN	Tatsuya Onodera
6	DF	JPN	Shunsuke Fukuda
7	MF	JPN	Taira Shige
8	MF	JPN	Naoto Ando
10	MF	JPN	Shota Inoue
11	FW	JPN	Tomoki Ikemoto
13	DF	JPN	Itsuki Urata
14	FW	JPN	Shoki Hirai
15	MF	JPN	Wataru Noguchi
16	FW	JPN	Sota Sato

No.	Pos.	Nation	Player
17	MF	JPN	Koken Kato
18	MF	JPN	Yohei Naito
19	MF	JPN	Daichi Kawashima
20	MF	JPN	Sho Hanai
21	GK	JPN	Takuya Takahashi
22	MF	JPN	Soya Fujiwara
23	MF	JPN	Ryuko Kito
24	DF	JPN	Nobuyuki Kawashima
25	FW	JPN	Hiroki Maeda
26	DF	JPN	Yukiya Kajiwara
27	GK	JPN	Kaiho Nakayama
29	MF	JPN	Kengo Kotani
43	MF	JPN	Masashi Motoyama

== J3 League ==
Match	Date	Team	Score	Team	Venue	Attendance
2	2018.03.17	Giravanz Kitakyushu	1-2	FC Ryukyu	Mikuni World Stadium Kitakyushu	4,503
3	2018.03.21	Fujieda MYFC	1-2	Giravanz Kitakyushu	Fujieda Soccer Stadium	508
4	2018.03.25	Giravanz Kitakyushu	0-2	Azul Claro Numazu	Mikuni World Stadium Kitakyushu	3,417
5	2018.04.01	AC Nagano Parceiro	1-1	Giravanz Kitakyushu	Nagano U Stadium	3,506
6	2018.04.08	Giravanz Kitakyushu	0-4	SC Sagamihara	Mikuni World Stadium Kitakyushu	3,453
7	2018.04.14	FC Tokyo U-23	0-1	Giravanz Kitakyushu	Yumenoshima Stadium	1,075
8	2018.04.29	Giravanz Kitakyushu	0-1	Thespakusatsu Gunma	Mikuni World Stadium Kitakyushu	5,948
9	2018.05.03	Blaublitz Akita	1-0	Giravanz Kitakyushu	Akigin Stadium	1,913
10	2018.05.06	Cerezo Osaka U-23	1-1	Giravanz Kitakyushu	Kincho Stadium	1,159
11	2018.05.20	Giravanz Kitakyushu	0-4	Gamba Osaka U-23	Mikuni World Stadium Kitakyushu	4,363
12	2018.06.03	Kataller Toyama	3-0	Giravanz Kitakyushu	Toyama Stadium	2,544
13	2018.06.10	Grulla Morioka	2-0	Giravanz Kitakyushu	Iwagin Stadium	1,129
14	2018.06.16	Giravanz Kitakyushu	2-3	YSCC Yokohama	Mikuni World Stadium Kitakyushu	4,886
15	2018.06.24	Fukushima United FC	2-2	Giravanz Kitakyushu	Toho Stadium	1,713
16	2018.06.30	Giravanz Kitakyushu	3-0	Gainare Tottori	Mikuni World Stadium Kitakyushu	3,360
18	2018.07.15	YSCC Yokohama	0-0	Giravanz Kitakyushu	NHK Spring Mitsuzawa Football Stadium	1,231
17	2018.08.18	Giravanz Kitakyushu	0-0	Kagoshima United FC	Mikuni World Stadium Kitakyushu	4,341
20	2018.08.25	Giravanz Kitakyushu	1-0	AC Nagano Parceiro	Mikuni World Stadium Kitakyushu	12,812
21	2018.09.02	Azul Claro Numazu	1-0	Giravanz Kitakyushu	Ashitaka Park Stadium	5,687
22	2018.09.08	Giravanz Kitakyushu	2-1	Kataller Toyama	Mikuni World Stadium Kitakyushu	3,143
23	2018.09.15	Kagoshima United FC	1-0	Giravanz Kitakyushu	Shiranami Stadium	5,216
24	2018.09.22	Giravanz Kitakyushu	1-2	Cerezo Osaka U-23	Mikuni World Stadium Kitakyushu	3,980
25	2018.09.29	Giravanz Kitakyushu	1-1	Fujieda MYFC	Mikuni World Stadium Kitakyushu	2,320
26	2018.10.06	FC Ryukyu	1-0	Giravanz Kitakyushu	Tapic Kenso Hiyagon Stadium	2,309
27	2018.10.13	SC Sagamihara	1-0	Giravanz Kitakyushu	Sagamihara Gion Stadium	3,012
28	2018.10.21	Giravanz Kitakyushu	0-0	FC Tokyo U-23	Mikuni World Stadium Kitakyushu	3,384
29	2018.10.28	Giravanz Kitakyushu	2-1	Grulla Morioka	Mikuni World Stadium Kitakyushu	3,047
30	2018.11.04	Gainare Tottori	1-1	Giravanz Kitakyushu	Chubu Yajin Stadium	3,125
31	2018.11.11	Giravanz Kitakyushu	0-2	Blaublitz Akita	Mikuni World Stadium Kitakyushu	4,509
32	2018.11.18	Thespakusatsu Gunma	1-0	Giravanz Kitakyushu	Shoda Shoyu Stadium Gunma	3,384
33	2018.11.25	Gamba Osaka U-23	2-1	Giravanz Kitakyushu	Panasonic Stadium Suita	1,334
34	2018.12.02	Giravanz Kitakyushu	0-0	Fukushima United FC	Mikuni World Stadium Kitakyushu	4,548
