= Shun Tanaka =

Japanese footballer

Shun Tanaka 田中舜
Personal information
- Full name: Shun Tanaka
- Date of birth: March 15, 1988 (age 38)
- Place of birth: Shizuoka, Japan
- Height: 1.77 m (5 ft 10 in)
- Position: Defender

Youth career
- 2006–2009: Rikkyo University

Senior career*
Years	Team	Apps	(Gls)
2011	Arte Takasaki	30	(2)
2012	Japan Soccer College	14	(6)
2013–2015	Grulla Morioka	53	(0)
2016–2017	Azul Claro Numazu	26	(0)
2018	Grulla Morioka	15	(0)
- * Club domestic league appearances and goals as of 23 February 2019

Shun Tanaka (田中 舜, Tanaka Shun; born March 15, 1988) is a Japanese football player. He plays for Grulla Morioka.

== Playing career ==
Shun Tanaka joined to Arte Takasaki in 2011. He moved to Japan Soccer College in 2012, to Grulla Morioka in 2013. In 2016, he moved to Azul Claro Numazu.

== Club statistics ==
Updated to 23 February 2019.

Club performance			League		Cup		Total	
Season	Club	League	Apps	Goals	Apps	Goals	Apps	Goals
Japan			League		Emperor's Cup		Total	
2011	Arte Takasaki	JFL	30	2	2	0	32	2
2012	Japan Soccer College	JRL (Hokushinetsu, Div. 1)	14	6	–		14	6
2013	Grulla Morioka	JRL (Tohoku, Div. 1)	3	0	0	0	3	0
2014	Grulla Morioka	J3 League	31	0	1	0	32	0
2015	Grulla Morioka	J3 League	19	0	0	0	19	0
2016	Azul Claro Numazu	JFL	23	0	–		23	0
2017	Azul Claro Numazu	J3 League	3	0	3	0	6	0
2018	Grulla Morioka	J3 League	15	0	0	0	15	0
Total			115	8	6	0	121	8
