= Yohei Naito =

Japanese footballer

Yohei Naito 内藤 洋平
Personal information
- Full name: Yohei Naito
- Date of birth: July 9, 1988 (age 38)
- Place of birth: Yokohama, Kanagawa, Japan
- Height: 1.73 m (5 ft 8 in)
- Position: Midfielder

Team information
- Current team: Giravanz Kitakyushu
- Number: 8

Youth career
- 2006–2010: Ritsumeikan University

Senior career*
Years	Team	Apps	(Gls)
2011–2012	Kyoto Sanga	46	(4)
2013–	Giravanz Kitakyushu	110	(8)
Medal record
Kyoto Sanga FC
Runner-up	Emperor's Cup	2011
- * Club domestic league appearances and goals as of 23 February 2019

Yohei Naito (内藤 洋平, Naitō Yōhei; born July 9, 1988) is a Japanese football player.

== Career statistics ==
Updated to 23 February 2019.

Appearances and goals by club, season and competition
Club	Season	League			Emperor's Cup		Total	
Club	Season	Division	Apps	Goals	Apps	Goals	Apps	Goals
Kyoto Sanga	2011	J2 League	30	3	1	0	31	3
Kyoto Sanga	2012	J2 League	16	1	0	0	16	1
Giravanz Kitakyushu	2013	J2 League	10	2	0	0	10	2
Giravanz Kitakyushu	2014	J2 League	27	2	4	1	31	3
Giravanz Kitakyushu	2015	J2 League	17	1	1	0	18	1
Giravanz Kitakyushu	2016	J2 League	11	0	1	0	12	0
Giravanz Kitakyushu	2017	J3 League	23	1	2	0	25	1
Giravanz Kitakyushu	2018	J3 League	22	2	0	0	22	2
Career total			156	12	9	1	165	13
