= Makoto Fukoin =

Japanese footballer

Makoto Fukoin 普光院 誠
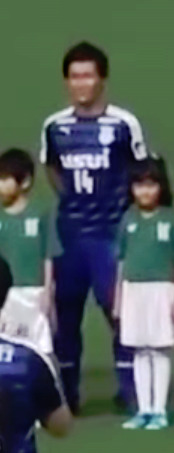

Personal information
- Full name: Makoto Fukoin
- Date of birth: May 20, 1993 (age 33)
- Place of birth: Fukuoka, Fukuoka, Japan
- Height: 1.70 m (5 ft 7 in)
- Position: Midfielder

Team information
- Current team: Gainare Tottori
- Number: 14

Youth career
- –2005: Wakahisa FC
- 2006–2008: Chikuyo Gakuen Junior High School
- 2009–2011: Chikuyo Gakuen High School

College career
| Years | Team | Apps | (Gls) |
| 2012–2015 | Kanto Gakuin University | | |

Senior career*
| Years | Team | Apps | (Gls) |
| 2016–2017 | SC Sagamihara | 52 | (4) |
| 2018–2020 | Azul Claro Numazu | 92 | (2) |
| 2021–2022 | Blaublitz Akita | 38 | (1) |
| 2023– | Gainare Tottori | 97 | (12) |
- * Club domestic league appearances and goals as of 1 January 2026

Makoto Fukoin (普光院 誠, Fukōin Makoto; born May 20, 1993) is a Japanese football player. He plays for Gainare Tottori.

== Club statistics ==
Updated to 26 November 2022.

| Club performance | | | League | | Cup | | Total | |
| Season | Club | League | Apps | Goals | Apps | Goals | Apps | Goals |
| Japan | | | League | | Emperor's Cup | | Total | |
|---|---|---|---|---|---|---|---|---|
| 2016 | SC Sagamihara | J3 League | 25 | 1 | – | | 25 | 1 |
| 2017 | SC Sagamihara | J3 League | 27 | 3 | – | | 27 | 3 |
| 2018 | Azul Claro Numazu | J3 League | 31 | 2 | – | | 31 | 2 |
| 2019 | Azul Claro Numazu | J3 League | 29 | 0 | – | | 29 | 0 |
| 2020 | Azul Claro Numazu | J3 League | 32 | 0 | – | | 32 | 0 |
| 2021 | Blaublitz Akita | J2 League | 24 | 1 | 1 | 0 | 25 | 1 |
| 2022 | Blaublitz Akita | J2 League | 14 | 0 | 0 | 0 | 14 | 0 |
| Total | | | 182 | 7 | 1 | 0 | 183 | 7 |
