= Tomoyuki Shiraishi =

Japanese footballer (born 1993)

Tomoyuki Shiraishi 白石 智之
Personal information
- Full name: Tomoyuki Shiraishi
- Date of birth: June 10, 1993 (age 33)
- Place of birth: Gunma, Japan
- Height: 1.74 m (5 ft 8 1/2 in)
- Position: Midfielder

Team information
- Current team: Reilac Shiga FC
- Number: 14

Youth career
- 2012–2015: Hosei University

Senior career*
Years	Team	Apps	(Gls)
2016–2017	Azul Claro Numazu	37	(4)
2018	Grulla Morioka	26	(3)
2019	Kataller Toyama	33	(2)
2020–2024	Thespakusatsu Gunma	71	(5)
2024-	Reilac Shiga FC	63	(3)
- * Club domestic league appearances and goals as of 23 August 2026

Tomoyuki Shiraishi (白石 智之, Shiraishi Tomoyuki; born June 10, 1993) is a Japanese football player. He plays for Reilac Shiga FC.

== Career ==
Tomoyuki Shiraishi joined Japan Football League club Azul Claro Numazu in 2016.

== Club statistics ==
Updated to 22 February 2018.

Club performance			League		Cup		Total	
Season	Club	League	Apps	Goals	Apps	Goals	Apps	Goals
Japan			League		Emperor's Cup		Total	
2016	Azul Claro Numazu	JFL	17	0	0	0	17	0
2017	Azul Claro Numazu	J3 League	20	4	3	0	23	4
2018	Grulla Morioka	J3 League	26	3	1	0	27	3
2019	Kataller Toyama	J3 League	33	2	2	0	35	2
Total			92	9	6	0	98	9
