= Yusei Kayanuma =

Japanese footballer (born 1993)

Yusei Kayanuma 萱沼 優聖
Personal information
- Full name: Yusei Kayanuma
- Date of birth: August 6, 1993 (age 33)
- Place of birth: Yamanashi, Japan
- Height: 1.75 m (5 ft 9 in)
- Position: Forward

Team information
- Current team: YSCC Yokohama
- Number: 9

Youth career
- Volcano Fujiyoshida JSC
- –2008: U SC
- 2009–2011: Yamanashi Gakuin Univ. High School

College career
Years	Team	Apps	(Gls)
2012–2015	Kanto Gakuin University		

Senior career*
Years	Team	Apps	(Gls)
2015–2017	Kataller Toyama	45	(8)
2018–2021	Kagoshima United FC	93	(11)
2022	Vanraure Hachinohe	31	(3)
2023–	YSCC Yokohama	51	(6)
- * Club domestic league appearances and goals as of 01:46, 31 August 2024 (UTC)

Yusei Kayanuma (萱沼 優聖, Kayanuma Yūsei; born August 6, 1993) is a Japanese football player, who plays for YSCC Yokohama as a forward.

== Career ==
=== Kataller Toyama ===
Kayanuma was chosen as Special Designated Player in July 2015, but in January 2016 he signed a full pro-contract with Kataller Toyama. In 2017, he participated in the 2017 J League Tryouts.

=== Kagoshima United ===
Kayanuma made his debut for Kagoshima against Nagano Parceiro on 3 May 2018. He scored his first goals for the club against Tokyo II on 3 June 2018, scoring a brace.

=== Vanraure Hachinohe ===
On 6 January 2022, Kayanuma was announced at Vanraure. He made his debut for Vanraure against Tegevajaro Miyazaki on 13 March 2022. He scored his first goal for the club against Kamatamare Sanuki on 17 April 2022, scoring in the 85th minute.

=== YSCC ===
On 28 December 2022, Kayanuma was announced at YSCC. He made his debut for YSCC against Kataller Toyama on 5 March 2023. He scored his first goals for the club on 26 March 2023 against Nara Club, scoring a brace.

== Club statistics ==
Updated to 23 February 2019.

Club performance			League		Cup		Total	
Season	Club	League	Apps	Goals	Apps	Goals	Apps	Goals
Japan			League		Emperor's Cup		Total	
2015	Kataller Toyama	J3 League	6	1	–		6	1
2016	Kataller Toyama	J3 League	28	7	2	0	30	7
2017	Kataller Toyama	J3 League	11	0	0	0	11	0
2018	Kagoshima United FC	J3 League	23	3	2	0	25	3
Total			68	11	4	0	72	11
