= Norimasa Nakanishi =

Japanese footballer (born 1991)

Norimasa Nakanishi 中西規真
Personal information
- Full name: Norimasa Nakanishi
- Date of birth: 11 April 1991 (age 35)
- Place of birth: Hyōgo, Japan
- Height: 1.78 m (5 ft 10 in)
- Position: Defender

Youth career
- 2007–2009: Takigawa High School
- 2010–2013: Nippon Sport Science University

Senior career*
Years	Team	Apps	(Gls)
2014–2019	YSCC Yokohama	128	(2)
- * Club domestic league appearances and goals as of 10 January 2020

Norimasa Nakanishi (中西規真, Nakanishi, Norimasa; born 11 April 1991) is a Japanese former footballer who last played for YSCC Yokohama.

== Career ==
Nakanishi retired at the end of the 2019 season.

== Club statistics ==
Updated to 23 February 2020.

Club performance			League		Cup		Total	
Season	Club	League	Apps	Goals	Apps	Goals	Apps	Goals
Japan			League		Emperor's Cup		Total	
2014	YSCC Yokohama	J3 League	33	2	2	0	35	2
2015	YSCC Yokohama	J3 League	20	0	0	0	20	0
2016	YSCC Yokohama	J3 League	23	0	–		23	0
2017	YSCC Yokohama	J3 League	26	0	1	0	27	0
2018	YSCC Yokohama	J3 League	22	0	2	0	24	0
2019	YSCC Yokohama	J3 League	4	0	0	0	4	0
Career total			128	2	5	0	133	2
