= Hiroki Okuda =

Japanese footballer (born 1992)

Hiroki Okuda 奥田 裕貴
Personal information
- Full name: Hiroki Okuda
- Date of birth: October 5, 1992 (age 34)
- Place of birth: Osaka, Japan
- Height: 1.76 m (5 ft 9 1/2 in)
- Position: Defender

Team information
- Current team: Tegevajaro Miyazaki
- Number: 37

Youth career
- 2011–2014: Meiji University

Senior career*
Years	Team	Apps	(Gls)
2015–2016	Igosso Kochi/Kochi; United SC	26	(3)
2017	YSCC Yokohama	10	(0)
2018	Gainare Tottori	18	(0)
2019–	Tegevajaro Miyazaki	19	(2)
- * Club domestic league appearances and goals as of 22 February 2020

Hiroki Okuda (奥田 裕貴, Okuda Hiroki; born October 5, 1992) is a Japanese football player. He plays for Tegevajaro Miyazaki.

== Career ==
Hiroki Okuda joined Japanese Regional Leagues club Igosso Kochi FC (later; Kochi United SC) in 2015. In 2017, he moved to J3 League club YSCC Yokohama.

== Club statistics ==
Updated to 22 February 2020.

Club performance			League		Cup		Total	
Season	Club	League	Apps	Goals	Apps	Goals	Apps	Goals
Japan			League		Emperor's Cup		Total	
2015	Igosso Kochi	JRL (Shikoku)	14	2	0	0	14	2
2016	Kochi United SC	JRL (Shikoku)	12	1	1	0	13	1
2017	YSCC Yokohama	J3 League	10	0	1	0	11	0
2018	Gainare Tottori	J3 League	18	0	2	0	20	0
2019	Tegevajaro Miyazaki	JFL	19	2	–		19	2
Total			73	5	4	0	77	5
