= Inamori =

Inamori (written: 稲森 or 稲盛) is a Japanese surname. Notable people with the surname include:

- Izumi Inamori (稲森 いずみ, born 1972), Japanese actress
- Katsuhisa Inamori (稲森 克尚, born 1994), Japanese footballer
- Kazuo Inamori (稲盛 和夫, 1932–2022), Japanese businessman and philanthropist
- Nami Inamori (稲森 奈見, born 1993), Japanese judoka
- Yuki Inamori (稲森 佑貴, born 1994), Japanese golfer
