= Fadel Karbon =

Norwegian footballer (born 1992)

Personal information
- Date of birth: 10 December 1992 (age 33)
- Place of birth: Tønsberg, Norway
- Height: 1.92 m (6 ft 3 1/2 in)
- Position: Forward

Youth career
- Skeid
- Grüner

Senior career*
Years	Team	Apps	(Gls)
2012–2014	Grüner		
2015–2018	Lyn	40	(24)
2018	Ryukyu	4	(0)
- * Club domestic league appearances and goals as of 5 January 2019

Fadel Karbon (born 10 December 1992) is a Norwegian footballer who plays as a forward.

== Career statistics ==
=== Club ===
As of 24 September 2018.

Club	Season	League			Cup		Continental		Other		Total	
Club	Season	Division	Apps	Goals	Apps	Goals	Apps	Goals	Apps	Goals	Apps	Goals
Lyn	2015	2. divisjon	4	1	0	0	–		0	0	4	1
Lyn	2016	3. divisjon	16	11	2 (Note: Appearances in the NM Cupen)	1	–		0	0	18	12
Lyn	2017	3. divisjon	17	10	3	2	–		0	0	20	12
Lyn	2018	3. divisjon	3	2	0	0	–		0	0	3	2
Lyn	Total		40	24	5	3	0	0	0	0	45	27
Ryukyu	2018	J3 League	4	0	0	0	–		0	0	4	0
Career total			53	27	5	3	0	0	0	0	58	30
