= Keisuke Minegishi =

Japanese footballer (born 1991)

Keisuke Minegishi 嶺岸 佳介
Personal information
- Full name: Keisuke Minegishi
- Date of birth: September 12, 1991 (age 35)
- Place of birth: Sendai, Japan
- Height: 1.73 m (5 ft 8 in)
- Position: Defender

Youth career
- 2010–2013: Kokushikan University

Senior career*
Years	Team	Apps	(Gls)
2014–2017	Zweigen Kanazawa	26	(0)
2018	Azul Claro Numazu	0	(0)
- * Club domestic league appearances and goals as of 23 February 2019

Keisuke Minegishi (嶺岸 佳介, Minegishi Keisuke; born September 12, 1991 in Sendai) is a former Japanese football player.

== Career ==
After just five seasons as a professional footballer, Minegishi announced his retirement in December 2018.

== Career statistics ==
Updated to 23 February 2019.

Appearances and goals by club, season and competition
Club	Season	League			Emperor's Cup		Total	
Club	Season	Division	Apps	Goals	Apps	Goals	Apps	Goals
Zweigen Kanazawa	2014	J3 League	12	0	0	0	12	0
Zweigen Kanazawa	2015	J2 League	4	0	1	1	5	1
Zweigen Kanazawa	2016	J2 League	9	0	1	0	10	0
Zweigen Kanazawa	2017	J2 League	1	0	0	0	1	0
Azul Claro Numazu	2018	J3 League	0	0	0	0	0	0
Career total			26	0	2	1	28	1
