= Satoru Oki =

Japanese footballer

Satoru Oki 大木暁
Personal information
- Full name: Satoru Oki
- Date of birth: December 8, 1992 (age 33)
- Place of birth: Adachi, Tokyo, Japan
- Height: 1.68 m (5 ft 6 in)
- Position: Defender

Team information
- Current team: Tochigi Uva FC
- Number: 2

Youth career
- 2011–2014: Komazawa University

Senior career*
Years	Team	Apps	(Gls)
2015–2017	Tokyo Verdy	14	(0)
2017	→ Nagano Parceiro (loan)	1	(0)
2018–	Tochigi Uva FC		
- * Club domestic league appearances and goals as of 23 February 2018

Satoru Oki (大木 暁, Ōki Satoru; born December 8, 1992 in Tokyo) is a Japanese football player. He plays for Tochigi Uva FC.

== Career statistics ==
Updated to 23 February 2018.

Appearances and goals by club, season and competition
Club	Season	League			Emperor's Cup		Total	
Club	Season	Division	Apps	Goals	Apps	Goals	Apps	Goals
Tokyo Verdy	2015	J2 League	5	0	2	0	7	0
Tokyo Verdy	2016	J2 League	9	0	3	0	12	0
Nagano Parceiro	2017	J3 League	1	0	4	0	5	0
Career total			15	0	9	0	24	0
