= Noritaka Fujisawa =

Japanese footballer

Personal information
- Full name: Noritaka Fujisawa
- Date of birth: 23 August 1988 (age 38)
- Place of birth: Kuwana, Mie, Japan
- Height: 1.70 m (5 ft 7 in)
- Position: Midfielder

Team information
- Current team: Veertien Mie
- Number: 15

Youth career
- 2002–2004: Ryosei Junior High School
- 2005–2007: Sanfrecce Hiroshima

College career
Years	Team	Apps	(Gls)
2008–2011	Kansai University		

Senior career*
Years	Team	Apps	(Gls)
2012	Sagawa Shiga FC	3	(0)
2013	SC Viktoria 06 Griesheim	0	(0)
2014–2017	FC Ryukyu	121	(16)
2018–2021	Kagoshima United FC	73	(3)
2021-2022	Okinawa SV	23	(8)
2022-Present	Veertien Mie	53	(1)
- * Club domestic league appearances and goals as of 27 January 2024 @ 19:03(AEST)

Noritaka Fujisawa (藤澤 典隆, Fujisawa Noritaka; born 23 August 1988) is a Japanese footballer who plays for Kagoshima United FC.

== Career ==
After being picked as captain for his University football team, Fujisawa was signed by JFL-team Sagawa Shiga FC. He even had a brief stint in 5th German football division with SC Viktoria 06 Griesheim, but he was released after few months. Returned in Japan, he signed for FC Ryūkyū.

== Club statistics ==
Updated to end of 2018 season.

Club performance			League		Cup		Total	
Season	Club	League	Apps	Goals	Apps	Goals	Apps	Goals
Japan			League		Emperor's Cup		Total	
2012	Sagawa Shiga FC	JFL	3	0	0	0	3	0
2012-13	SC Viktoria 06 Griesheim	Oberliga	0	0	–		0	0
2014	FC Ryukyu	J3 League	33	6	2	1	35	7
2015	FC Ryukyu	J3 League	26	3	1	0	27	3
2016	FC Ryukyu	J3 League	30	2	2	0	32	2
2017	FC Ryukyu	J3 League	32	5	1	0	33	5
2018	Kagoshima United	J3 League	30	2	0	0	30	2
Career total			154	18	6	1	160	19
