= Katsuhisa Inamori =

Japanese footballer

Katsuhisa Inamori 稲森克尚
Personal information
- Full name: Katsuhisa Inamori
- Date of birth: 8 March 1994 (age 32)
- Place of birth: Hirakata, Osaka, Japan
- Height: 1.85 m (6 ft 1 in)
- Position: Defender

Youth career
- 2003–2011: Gamba Osaka Youth

Senior career*
Years	Team	Apps	(Gls)
2012–2014	Gamba Osaka	0	(0)
2014	→ Gainare Tottori (loan)	1	(0)
2015–2017	Gainare Tottori	65	(1)
2018	Grulla Morioka	13	(0)
Medal record
Gamba Osaka
Runner-up	Emperor's Cup	2012
- * Club domestic league appearances and goals as of 23 February 2019

Katsuhisa Inamori (稲森克尚, Inamori Katsuhisa; born 8 March 1994 in Hirakata, Osaka) is a former Japanese footballer who plays for Grulla Morioka.

== Career ==
After a brief career between Osaka and Tottori, Inamori signed for Grulla Morioka and enjoyed just one season there before retiring at the end of the year.

== Club statistics ==
Updated to 23 February 2019.

Club performance			League		Cup		League Cup		Continental		Total	
Season	Club	League	Apps	Goals	Apps	Goals	Apps	Goals	Apps	Goals	Apps	Goals
Japan			League		Emperor's Cup		J. League Cup		AFC		Total	
2012	Gamba Osaka	J1 League	0	0	0	0	0	0	0	0	0	0
2013	Gamba Osaka	J2 League	0	0	0	0	–		–		0	0
2014	Gainare Tottori	J3 League	1	0	0	0	–		–		1	0
2015	Gainare Tottori	J3 League	29	1	1	0	–		–		30	1
2016	Gainare Tottori	J3 League	15	0	2	0	–		–		17	0
2017	Gainare Tottori	J3 League	21	0	1	0	–		–		22	0
2018	Grulla Morioka	J3 League	13	0	1	0	–		–		14	0
Career total			79	1	5	0	0	0	0	0	84	1
