= Toshiya Omi =

Japanese footballer

Personal information
- Date of birth: 12 October 1995 (age 31)
- Place of birth: Saitama, Japan
- Height: 1.68 m (5 ft 6 in)
- Position: Defender

Team information
- Current team: YSCC Yokohama
- Number: 22

Youth career
- Ishihara SSS
- Konan Minami SSS
- Kumagaya SC
- Yokohama F. Marinos
- –2017: Senshu University

Senior career*
Years	Team	Apps	(Gls)
2018–	YSCC Yokohama	8	(0)
- * Club domestic league appearances and goals as of 17:04, 12 November 2020 (UTC)

Toshiya Omi (尾身 俊哉, Omi Toshiya; born 12 October 1995) is a Japanese footballer currently playing as a defender for YSCC Yokohama.

== Career statistics ==
=== Club ===
As of 12 November 2020.

Club	Season	League			National Cup		League Cup		Other		Total	
Club	Season	Division	Apps	Goals	Apps	Goals	Apps	Goals	Apps	Goals	Apps	Goals
YSCC Yokohama	2018	J3 League	0	0	0	0	0	0	0	0	0	0
YSCC Yokohama	2019	J3 League	4	0	0	0	0	0	0	0	4	0
YSCC Yokohama	2020	J3 League	4	0	0	0	0	0	0	0	4	0
Career total			8	0	0	0	0	0	0	0	8	0
