= Yasuhito Tomita =

Japanese footballer

Yasuhito Tomita 富田 康仁
Personal information
- Full name: Yasuhito Tomita
- Date of birth: April 18, 1990 (age 36)
- Place of birth: Aichi, Japan
- Height: 1.68 m (5 ft 6 in)
- Position: Midfielder

Youth career
- 2009–2012: Hokuriku University

Senior career*
Years	Team	Apps	(Gls)
2013–2017	Zweigen Kanazawa	40	(3)
2018	Azul Claro Numazu	26	(1)
Total		66	(4)
- * Club domestic league appearances and goals

Yasuhito Tomita (富田 康仁, Tomita Yasuhito; born April 18, 1990 in Aichi) is a former Japanese football player.

== Career statistics ==
Updated to 30 December 2018.

Appearances and goals by club, season and competition
Club	Season	League			Emperor's Cup		Total	
Club	Season	Division	Apps	Goals	Apps	Goals	Apps	Goals
Zweigen Kanazawa	2013	JFL	4	0	0	0	4	0
Zweigen Kanazawa	2014	J3 League	23	3	2	0	25	3
Zweigen Kanazawa	2015	J2 League	3	0	1	0	4	0
Zweigen Kanazawa	2016	J2 League	7	0	2	1	9	1
Zweigen Kanazawa	2017	J2 League	3	0	1	0	4	0
Azul Claro Numazu	2018	J3 League	26	1	–		26	1
Career total			66	4	6	1	72	5
