= Kohei Takayanagi =

Japanese footballer

Kohei Takayanagi 高柳昂平
Personal information
- Full name: Kohei Takayanagi
- Date of birth: April 14, 1994 (age 32)
- Place of birth: Nisshin, Aichi, Japan
- Height: 1.81 m (5 ft 11 1/2 in)
- Position: Forward

Youth career
- 2010–2012: Meito Senior High School
- 2013–2016: University of Tsukuba

Senior career*
Years	Team	Apps	(Gls)
2017	Iwaki FC	6	(20)
2018	Grulla Morioka	2	(0)
- * Club domestic league appearances and goals as of 1 January 2019

Kohei Takayanagi (高柳昂平, Takayanagi Kohei; born April 14, 1994) is a former Japanese football player.

== Career ==
After attending University of Tsukuba, Kohei Takayanagi signed for Iwaki FC. A wonderful 2017 season - concluded with 23 goals in just 9 games between league and Emperor's Cup - brought Takayanagi to Grulla Morioka for 2018 season, playing so his first pro-season.

== Club statistics ==
Updated to 1 January 2019.

Club performance			League		Cup		Total	
Season	Club	League	Apps	Goals	Apps	Goals	Apps	Goals
Japan			League		Emperor's Cup		Total	
2017	Iwaki FC	JPL (Fukushima, Div. 1)	6	20	3	3	9	23
2018	Grulla Morioka	J3 League	4	0	1	0	5	0
Total			\0	20	4	3	14	23
