= Yu Doan =

Japanese footballer

Yu Doan 堂安憂
Personal information
- Full name: Yu Doan
- Date of birth: 14 December 1995 (age 30)
- Place of birth: Amagasaki, Japan
- Height: 1.69 m (5 ft 7 in)
- Position: Midfielder

Team information
- Current team: Ococias Kyoto AC
- Number: 18

Youth career
- 2014–2017: Biwako Seikei Sport College

Senior career*
Years	Team	Apps	(Gls)
2018–2019	Nagano Parceiro	37	(6)
2020–	Ococias Kyoto AC		
- * Club domestic league appearances and goals as of 1 January 2020

Yu Doan (堂安憂, Doan Yu; born 14 December 1995, in Amagasaki) is a Japanese footballer who plays for Ococias Kyoto AC.

== Career ==
After being the captain at Biwako Seikei Sport College, Yu Doan joined Nagano Parceiro.

== Club statistics ==
Updated to 1 January 2020.

== Personal life ==
Yu Doan is the sibling of Eintracht Frankfurt Japanese international Ritsu Dōan.

Club performance			League		Cup		Total	
Season	Club	League	Apps	Goals	Apps	Goals	Apps	Goals
Japan			League		Emperor's Cup		Total	
2018	Nagano Parceiro	J3 League	25	5	2	0	27	5
2019	Nagano Parceiro	J3 League	12	1	2	0	14	1
Career total			37	6	4	0	41	6
