= Ryo Takiya =

Japanese footballer

Ryo Takiya 瀧谷 亮
Personal information
- Full name: Ryo Takiya
- Date of birth: February 16, 1994 (age 32)
- Place of birth: Zama, Kanagawa, Japan
- Height: 1.87 m (6 ft 2 in)
- Position: Forward

Youth career
- 2012–2015: Osaka Gakuin University

Senior career*
Years	Team	Apps	(Gls)
2016–2017	FC Gifu	30	(4)
2018–2019	Kataller Toyama	2	(0)
2019	→ ReinMeer Aomori	9	(1)
- * Club domestic league appearances and goals as of 5 April 2020

Ryo Takiya (瀧谷 亮, Takiya Ryō; born February 16, 1994) is a former Japanese football player. He plays for Kataller Toyama.

== Career ==
Ryo Takiya joined J2 League club FC Gifu in 2016. After joining ReinMeer Aomori on loan, he opted to retire at 25 years old.

== Club statistics ==
Updated to 5 April 2020.

Club performance			League		Cup		Total	
Season	Club	League	Apps	Goals	Apps	Goals	Apps	Goals
Japan			League		Emperor's Cup		Total	
2016	FC Gifu	J2 League	26	4	0	0	26	4
2017	FC Gifu	J2 League	4	0	0	0	4	0
2018	Kataller Toyama	J3 League	2	0	0	0	2	0
2019	ReinMeer Aomori	JFL	9	1	0	0	9	1
Total			41	5	0	0	41	5
