= Ryoichi Kawazu =

Japanese footballer (born 1992)

Personal information
- Full name: Ryoichi Kawazu
- Date of birth: May 22, 1992 (age 34)
- Place of birth: Osaka, Japan
- Height: 1.77 m (5 ft 9 1/2 in)
- Position: Defender

Team information
- Current team: Grulla Morioka
- Number: 6

Youth career
- 2011–2014: Senshu University

Senior career*
Years	Team	Apps	(Gls)
2015	JEF United Chiba	0	(0)
2015	→ Azul Claro Numazu (loan)	9	(1)
2016–2017	Azul Claro Numazu	4	(0)
2018–	Grulla Morioka		
- * Club domestic league appearances and goals as of 22 February 2018

Ryoichi Kawazu (河津 良一, Kawazu Ryoichi; born May 22, 1992) is a Japanese football player. He plays for Grulla Morioka.

== Career ==
Ryoichi Kawazu joined J2 League club JEF United Chiba in 2015. In August, he moved to Azul Claro Numazu, where he stayed two and a half-years. In January 2018, he opted to sign for Grulla Morioka.

== Club statistics ==
Updated to 22 February 2018.

Club performance			League		Cup		Total	
Season	Club	League	Apps	Goals	Apps	Goals	Apps	Goals
Japan			League		Emperor's Cup		Total	
2015	JEF United Chiba	J2 League	0	0	–		0	0
2015	Azul Claro Numazu	JFL	8	1	–		8	1
2016	Azul Claro Numazu	JFL	1	0	–		1	0
2017	Azul Claro Numazu	J3 League	3	0	3	1	6	1
Total			12	1	3	1	15	2
