= Kenzo Taniguchi =

Japanese footballer (born 1988)

Kenzo Taniguchi 谷口 堅三
Personal information
- Full name: Kenzo Taniguchi
- Date of birth: September 15, 1988 (age 38)
- Place of birth: Kagoshima, Japan
- Height: 1.80 m (5 ft 11 in)
- Position: Striker

Team information
- Current team: Veroskronos Tsuno
- Number: 9

Youth career
- Amigos Kagoshima

Senior career*
Years	Team	Apps	(Gls)
2007–2010	Sagan Tosu	31	(3)
2010–2013	FC Kagoshima	53	(75)
2014	Kagoshima United	13	(3)
2015–2017	Grulla Morioka	89	(18)
2018–2019	Fujieda MYFC	33	(8)
2020–	Veroskronos Tsuno		
- * Club domestic league appearances and goals as of 1 January 2020

Kenzo Taniguchi (谷口 堅三, Taniguchi Kenzō; born September 15, 1988 in Kagoshima) is a Japanese football player currently playing for Veroskronos Tsuno.

== Club career stats ==
Updated to 1 January 2020.

Club performance			League		Cup		Total	
Season	Club	League	Apps	Goals	Apps	Goals	Apps	Goals
Japan			League		Emperor's Cup		Total	
2007	Sagan Tosu	J2 League	4	0	0	0	4	0
2008	Sagan Tosu	J2 League	24	3	0	0	24	3
2009	Sagan Tosu	J2 League	3	0	0	0	3	0
2010	Sagan Tosu	J2 League	0	0	-		0	0
2010	FC Kagoshima	JPL						
2011	FC Kagoshima	JRL (Kyushu)	17	22	2	1	19	23
2012	FC Kagoshima	JRL (Kyushu)	18	26	-		18	26
2013	FC Kagoshima	JRL (Kyushu)	18	27	-		18	27
2014	Kagoshima United FC	JFL	13	3	1	0	14	3
2015	Grulla Morioka	J3 League	28	3	0	0	28	3
2016	Grulla Morioka	J3 League	29	8	3	1	32	9
2017	Grulla Morioka	J3 League	32	7	2	1	34	8
2018	Fujieda MYFC	J3 League	21	6	-		21	6
2019	Fujieda MYFC	J3 League	12	2	-		12	2
Total			219	107	8	3	226	110
