= Yosuke Komuta =

Japanese footballer

Yosuke Komuta 小牟田洋佑
Personal information
- Full name: Yosuke Komuta
- Date of birth: July 18, 1992 (age 34)
- Place of birth: Tochigi, Japan
- Height: 1.87 m (6 ft 1 1/2 in)
- Position: Forward

Team information
- Current team: Fukushima United FC
- Number: 18

Senior career*
| Years | Team | Apps | (Gls) |
| 2015–2018 | Thespakusatsu Gunma | 36 | (1) |
| 2017 | → Fukushima United FC (loan) | 12 | (1) |
| 2019– | Fukushima United FC | | |
- * Club domestic league appearances and goals as of 22 February 2019

Yosuke Komuta (小牟田 洋佑, Komuta Yosuke; born July 18, 1992 in Tochigi) is a Japanese football player. He plays for Fukushima United FC.

== Playing career ==
Yosuke Komuta joined to J2 League club; Thespakusatsu Gunma in 2015.

== Club statistics ==
Updated to 22 February 2019.

| Club performance | | | League | | Cup | | Total | |
| Season | Club | League | Apps | Goals | Apps | Goals | Apps | Goals |
| Japan | | | League | | Emperor's Cup | | Total | |
|---|---|---|---|---|---|---|---|---|
| 2015 | Thespakusatsu Gunma | J2 League | 17 | 0 | 1 | 0 | 18 | 0 |
| 2016 | Thespakusatsu Gunma | J2 League | 19 | 1 | 2 | 1 | 21 | 2 |
| 2017 | Thespakusatsu Gunma | J2 League | 0 | 0 | 0 | 0 | 0 | 0 |
| 2017 | Fukushima United FC | J3 League | 12 | 1 | 0 | 0 | 12 | 1 |
| 2018 | Thespakusatsu Gunma | J3 League | 6 | 0 | 2 | 0 | 8 | 0 |
| Total | | | 54 | 2 | 5 | 1 | 57 | 3 |
