= Yuya Yamada =

Japanese footballer

Yuya Yamada 山田裕也
Personal information
- Full name: Yuya Yamada
- Date of birth: 12 April 1988 (age 37)
- Place of birth: Kagoshima City, Kagoshima Prefecture, Japan
- Height: 1.74 m (5 ft 9 in)
- Position: Forward

Youth career
- 2004–2006: Reimei Senior High School

Senior career*
Years	Team	Apps	(Gls)
2007–2013	Volca Kagoshima		
2014–2017	Kagoshima United FC	68	(21)
- * Club domestic league appearances and goals as of 23 February 2018

Yuya Yamada (山田 裕也, Yamada Yūya; born 12 April 1988) is a former Japanese footballer who last played for Kagoshima United FC.

== Career ==
After a decade in football spent in Kagoshima between JFL and pro-football, Yamada opted to retire in January 2018, being nominated as a coach in Kagoshima United FC youth ranks.

== Club statistics ==
Updated to 23 February 2018.

Club performance			League		Cup		Total	
Season	Club	League	Apps	Goals	Apps	Goals	Apps	Goals
Japan			League		Emperor's Cup		Total	
2014	Kagoshima United FC	JFL	20	7	2	0	22	7
2015	Kagoshima United FC	JFL	28	11	1	0	29	11
2016	Kagoshima United FC	J3 League	15	3	0	0	15	3
2017	Kagoshima United FC	J3 League	5	0	0	0	5	0
Career total			68	21	3	0	71	21
