= Yoji Sasaki =

Japanese footballer

Yoji Sasaki 佐々木 陽次
Personal information
- Full name: Yoji Sasaki
- Date of birth: July 2, 1992 (age 34)
- Place of birth: Toyama, Japan
- Height: 1.73 m (5 ft 8 in)
- Position: Midfielder

Team information
- Current team: Kataller Toyama
- Number: 7

Youth career
- –2004: Shinjo SSC
- 2005–2007: Toyama Kita FC
- 2008–2010: FC Tokyo

College career
| Years | Team | Apps | (Gls) |
| 2011–2014 | Tokyo Gakugei University | | |

Senior career*
| Years | Team | Apps | (Gls) |
| 2015–2017 | Tokushima Vortis | 15 | (0) |
| 2017 | → Kataller Toyama (loan) | 24 | (6) |
| 2018– | Kataller Toyama | 140 | (19) |
- * Club domestic league appearances and goals as of 1 January 2026

Yoji Sasaki (佐々木 陽次, Sasaki Yōji; born July 2, 1992, in Toyama) is a Japanese football player for Kataller Toyama.

== Club statistics ==
Updated to 23 February 2018.

| Club performance | | | League | | Cup | | Total | |
| Season | Club | League | Apps | Goals | Apps | Goals | Apps | Goals |
| Japan | | | League | | Emperor's Cup | | Total | |
|---|---|---|---|---|---|---|---|---|
| 2015 | Tokushima Vortis | J2 League | 15 | 0 | 1 | 0 | 16 | 0 |
| 2016 | Tokushima Vortis | J2 League | 0 | 0 | 2 | 4 | 2 | 4 |
| 2017 | Kataller Toyama | J3 League | 24 | 6 | 1 | 0 | 25 | 6 |
| Career total | | | 39 | 6 | 4 | 4 | 43 | 10 |
