= Japan Soccer College =

Japanese football club based in Kitakanbara

Japan Soccer College FC
- Founded: 2002
- Ground: Japan Soccer College Ground
- Team Manager: Haruo Wada
- League: HFL Div. 1 (Japan 5th tier; JSC FC)
- 2023: 2nd of 8
- Website: https://cups-y.com/

Japan Soccer College (JAPANサッカーカレッジ, ~) is a Japanese football academy from Kitakanbara, Niigata. Its main football team is currently playing in the Hokushinetsu Football League's 1st Division and has played in the Emperor's Cup in the past.

The football academy has produced a number of J.League players, coaches and other staff members across Japan. As of the 2022 season, 54 of the 58 J.League members have at least one player or staff member who are JSC former alumni. The college claims themselves as the only football vocational school in Japan.

The academy (or college) has different teams across men's and women's football. As of 2023, the JSC-affiliated teams are:

- Men's teams:
  - Japan Soccer College FC – Hokushin'etsu Football League Division 1 (5th tier)
  - CUPS Seiro (College of Upward Players in Soccer Seiro) – Hokushin'etsu Football League Division 2 (6th tier)
  - Niigata JSC – Niigata Prefecture Football League Division 1 (7th tier)
- Women's teams:
  - Japan Soccer College Ladies – Hokushin'etsu Women's Football League Division 1 (4th tier)

== Current squads ==
=== Japan Soccer College FC ===
As of 26 April 2023.

Note: Flags indicate national team as defined under FIFA eligibility rules; some limited exceptions apply. Players may hold more than one non-FIFA nationality.

No.	Pos.	Nation	Player
1	GK	(Japan) JPN	Shunsuke Yao
2	DF	(Japan) JPN	Kota Matsumura
3	DF	(Japan) JPN	Daiki Yoshino
4	DF	(Japan) JPN	Yuma Ando
5	MF	(Japan) JPN	Shota Shinoda
6	MF	(Japan) JPN	Taisei Ono
7	DF	(Japan) JPN	Kengo Ota
8	MF	(Japan) JPN	Keita Akimoto
9	FW	(Japan) JPN	Naoki Uemoto
10	FW	(Japan) JPN	Ryota Watanabe

No.	Pos.	Nation	Player
11	FW	(Japan) JPN	Kanato Fukazawa
13	FW	(Japan) JPN	Kazuya Tanaka
14	MF	(Japan) JPN	Shuto Ono
15	DF	(Japan) JPN	Yuya Hamasaki
17	GK	(Japan) JPN	Hirotaka Matsuda
19	MF	(Japan) JPN	Takenobu Ito
20	MF	(Japan) JPN	Itsuki Ishibashi
22	FW	(Japan) JPN	Shingo Kotegawa
23	DF	(Japan) JPN	Tomoki Yamaguchi

=== CUPS Seiro ===
As of 26 April 2023.

Note: Flags indicate national team as defined under FIFA eligibility rules; some limited exceptions apply. Players may hold more than one non-FIFA nationality.

No.	Pos.	Nation	Player
1	GK	(Japan) JPN	Ryuhei Kameyama
2	DF	(Japan) JPN	Teru Okada
3	DF	(Japan) JPN	Michiya Endo
4	DF	(Japan) JPN	Hikaru Yamada
5	MF	(Japan) JPN	Zen Yamada
6	MF	(Japan) JPN	Yosuke Yamada
7	MF	(Japan) JPN	Shu Suzuki
8	MF	(Japan) JPN	Shumpei Harada
14	MF	(Japan) JPN	Hiroto Ono
15	FW	(Japan) JPN	Taiki Imazawa
16	MF	(Japan) JPN	Yuki Iwai

No.	Pos.	Nation	Player
17	GK	(Japan) JPN	Yoshiki Yoshida
18	MF	(Japan) JPN	Ryoma Tsunefuji
19	DF	(Japan) JPN	Raiha Aoyama
20	DF	(Japan) JPN	Shuma Muneyama
22	MF	(Japan) JPN	Kenta Uejima
23	FW	(Japan) JPN	Kota Tochikubo
24	MF	(Japan) JPN	Daiki Inamine
25	MF	(Japan) JPN	Masato Sonobe
27	MF	(Japan) JPN	Yuki Yamakawa
28	MF	(Japan) JPN	Ko Kawahara
33	DF	(Japan) JPN	Kiyan Sekine
