= Ryuki Nishimuro =

Japanese footballer

Ryuki Nishimuro 西室隆規
Personal information
- Full name: Ryuki Nishimuro
- Date of birth: 2 June 1993 (age 33)
- Place of birth: Yamanashi, Japan
- Height: 1.69 m (5 ft 7 in)
- Position: Midfielder

Team information
- Current team: ReinMeer Aomori
- Number: 6

Youth career
- 2012–2015: Hosei University

Senior career*
Years	Team	Apps	(Gls)
2016–2017	Kataller Toyama	17	(0)
2018	Verspah Oita	21	(2)
2019–	ReinMeer Aomori	15	(1)
- * Club domestic league appearances and goals as of 1 January 2020

Ryuki Nishimuro (西室隆規, Nishimuro, Ryuki; born 2 June 1993 in Yamanashi) is a Japanese footballer who plays for Verspah Oita.

== Club statistics ==
Updated to 1 January 2020.

Club performance			League		Cup		Total	
Season	Club	League	Apps	Goals	Apps	Goals	Apps	Goals
Japan			League		Emperor's Cup		Total	
2016	Kataller Toyama	J3 League	6	0	2	0	8	0
2017	Kataller Toyama	J3 League	11	0	1	0	12	0
2018	Verspah Oita	JFL	21	2	0	0	21	2
2019	ReinMeer Aomori	JFL	15	1	–		15	1
Career total			53	3	5	0	58	3
