= Hirohito Shinohara =

Japanese footballer

Hirohito Shinohara 篠原 宏仁
Personal information
- Full name: Hirohito Shinohara
- Date of birth: November 30, 1993 (age 32)
- Place of birth: Tsukuba, Ibaraki, Japan
- Height: 1.73 m (5 ft 8 in)
- Position: Midfielder

Team information
- Current team: Verspah Oita
- Number: 8

Youth career
- 2009–2011: Kashiwa Reysol

College career
Years	Team	Apps	(Gls)
2012–2015	Kansai University		

Senior career*
Years	Team	Apps	(Gls)
2016	Renofa Yamaguchi	0	(0)
2017	Fujieda MYFC	4	(0)
2018–	Verspah Oita		
- * Club domestic league appearances and goals as of 23 February 2018

Hirohito Shinohara (篠原 宏仁, Shinohara Hirohito; born November 30, 1993) is a Japanese football player for Verspah Oita.

== Career ==
Hirohito Shinohara joined J2 League club Renofa Yamaguchi FC in 2016. In 2017, he moved to J3 League club Fujieda MYFC.

== Club statistics ==
Updated to 23 February 2018.

Club performance			League		Cup		Total	
Season	Club	League	Apps	Goals	Apps	Goals	Apps	Goals
Japan			League		Emperor's Cup		Total	
2016	Renofa Yamaguchi	J2 League	0	0	0	0	0	0
2017	Fujieda MYFC	J3 League	4	0	–		4	0
Total			4	0	0	0	4	0
