= Junji Yamamichi =

Japanese footballer

Junji Yamamichi 山道 淳司
Personal information
- Full name: Junji Yamamichi
- Date of birth: 29 January 1994 (age 32)
- Place of birth: Fukuoka, Japan
- Height: 1.78 m (5 ft 10 in)
- Position: Defender

Team information
- Current team: Honda Lock SC
- Number: 4

Youth career
- 2012–2015: Fukuoka University

Senior career*
Years	Team	Apps	(Gls)
2016–2017	Gainare Tottori	40	(1)
2018–	Honda Lock SC	58	(4)
- * Club domestic league appearances and goals as of 23 February 2020

Junji Yamamichi (山道淳司, Yamamichi, Junji; born 29 January 1994) is a Japanese footballer who plays for Honda Lock SC.

== Club statistics ==
Updated to 23 February 2020.

Club performance			League		Cup		Total	
Season	Club	League	Apps	Goals	Apps	Goals	Apps	Goals
Japan			League		Emperor's Cup		Total	
2016	Gainare Tottori	J3 League	21	1	2	0	23	1
2017	Gainare Tottori	J3 League	19	0	0	0	19	0
2018	Honda Lock SC	JFL	29	1	–		29	1
2019	Honda Lock SC	JFL	29	3	2	0	31	3
Career total			98	5	4	0	102	5
