= Takashi Akiyama =

Japanese footballer

Takashi Akiyama 秋山貴嗣
Personal information
- Full name: Takashi Akiyama
- Date of birth: 7 October 1992 (age 34)
- Place of birth: Kagawa, Japan
- Height: 1.80 m (5 ft 11 in)
- Position: Defender

Team information
- Current team: Fujieda MYFC
- Number: 4

Youth career
- 2011–2014: Kansai University

Senior career*
Years	Team	Apps	(Gls)
2015–2017	Gainare Tottori	97	(5)
2018–	Fujieda MYFC	134	(5)
- * Club domestic league appearances and goals as of 20 November 2022, 12:22 (UTC)

Takashi Akiyama (秋山貴嗣, Akiyama Takashi; born 7 October 1992 in Kagawa) is a Japanese footballer who plays for Fujieda MYFC.

== Career ==
Akiyama began in Kansai University from 2011 to 2014 as youth team. In 2015, He signed to J3 club, Gainare Tottori after graduation from college. In 2017, He left for tottori after 2 years at club. In 2018, He signed to J3 club, Fujieda MYFC. On 20 November 2022, he brought his club promotion to J2 league for the first time in history.

== Career statistics ==
As of 20 November 2022.

Appearances and goals by club, season and competition
Club	Season	League			Emperor's Cup		Total	
Club	Season	Division	Apps	Goals	Apps	Goals	Apps	Goals
Gainare Tottori	2015	J3 League	36	1	2	0	38	1
Gainare Tottori	2016	J3 League	30	3	2	0	32	3
Gainare Tottori	2017	J3 League	31	1	1	0	32	1
Gainare Tottori	Total		97	5	5	0	102	5
Fujieda MYFC	2018	J3 League	30	1	0	0	30	1
Fujieda MYFC	2019	J3 League	33	0	0	0	33	0
Fujieda MYFC	2020	J3 League	34	2	0	0	34	2
Fujieda MYFC	2021	J3 League	13	1	0	0	13	1
Fujieda MYFC	2022	J3 League	24	1	1	0	25	1
Fujieda MYFC	2023	J2 League	0	0	0	0	0	0
Fujieda MYFC	Total		134	5	1	0	135	5
Career total			231	10	6	0	237	10
