= Ryoto Higa =

Japanese footballer

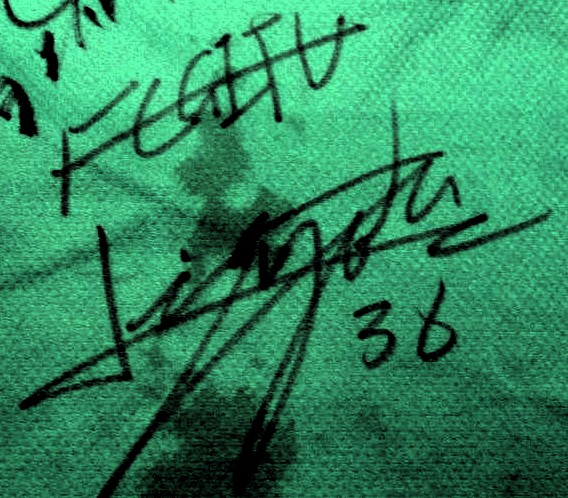
- Autograph in 2014

Personal information
- Full name: Ryoto Higa
- Date of birth: 17 October 1990 (age 36)
- Place of birth: Takayama, Japan
- Height: 1.76 m (5 ft 9 1/2 in)
- Position: Attacking midfielder

Youth career
- –2012: Niigata University of Health and Welfare

Senior career*
Years	Team	Apps	(Gls)
2013–2017	FC Gifu	28	(1)
2013	→ FC Gifu Second (loan)	12	(3)
2016–2017	→ Blaublitz Akita (loan)	18	(1)
- * Club domestic league appearances and goals as of 23 February 2018

Ryoto Higa (比嘉 諒人, born 17 October 1990) is a Japanese football player who last played for Blaublitz Akita.

== Club statistics ==
Updated to 23 February 2018.

Club performance			League		Cup		Total	
Season	Club	League	Apps	Goals	Apps	Goals	Apps	Goals
Japan			League		Emperor's Cup		Total	
2013	FC Gifu Second	JRL	12	3	1	0	13	3
2014	FC Gifu	J2 League	27	1	0	0	27	1
2015	FC Gifu	J2 League	1	0	2	0	3	0
2016	Blaublitz Akita	J3 League	16	1	1	0	17	1
2017	Blaublitz Akita	J3 League	2	0	1	0	3	0
Total			58	5	5	0	63	5

== Honours ==
Blaublitz Akita

- J3 League (1): 2017
