= Akira Akao =

Japanese footballer

Akira Akao 赤尾公
Personal information
- Full name: Akira Akao
- Date of birth: 15 February 1988 (age 38)
- Place of birth: Kagoshima City, Kagoshima Prefecture, Japan
- Height: 1.77 m (5 ft 10 in)
- Position: Midfielder

Youth career
- 2006–2009: National Institute of Fitness and Sports in Kanoya

Senior career*
Years	Team	Apps	(Gls)
2010	Gainare Tottori	2	(1)
2011	SC Tottori Dreams		
2012–2013	Volca Kagoshima	30	(8)
2014–2019	Kagoshima United FC	135	(13)
- * Club domestic league appearances and goals as of 5 January 2020

Akira Akao (赤尾公, Akao Akira; born 15 February 1988 in Kagoshima) is a former Japanese footballer who last featured for Kagoshima United FC.

== Career ==
After being a senator for Kagoshima United FC, he retired in January 2020.

== Club statistics ==
Updated to 23 February 2020.

Club performance			League		Cup		Total	
Season	Club	League	Apps	Goals	Apps	Goals	Apps	Goals
Japan			League		Emperor's Cup		Total	
2010	Gainare Tottori	JFL	2	1	0	0	2	1
2011	SC Tottori Dreams	Tottori Football League			0	0	0	0
2012	Volca Kagoshima	JRL (Kyushu)	15	0	2	1	17	1
2013	Volca Kagoshima	JRL (Kyushu)	17	8	0	0	17	8
2014	Kagoshima United FC	JFL	25	8	2	0	27	8
2015	Kagoshima United FC	JFL	24	1	1	0	25	1
2016	Kagoshima United FC	J3 League	26	3	1	0	27	3
2017	Kagoshima United FC	J3 League	31	0	1	0	32	0
2018	Kagoshima United FC	J3 League	10	0	2	0	12	0
2019	Kagoshima United FC	J2 League	19	1	0	0	19	1
Career total			167	22	10	1	176	23
