= Yusuke Hoshino =

Japanese footballer

Yusuke Hoshino 星野 有亮
Personal information
- Full name: Yusuke Hoshino
- Date of birth: May 12, 1992 (age 34)
- Place of birth: Tokyo, Japan
- Height: 1.75 m (5 ft 9 in)
- Position: Midfielder

Youth career
- 2011–2014: Senshu University

Senior career*
Years	Team	Apps	(Gls)
2015–2017	Zweigen Kanazawa	25	(1)
2018–2019	Gainare Tottori	52	(0)
Total		77	(1)
- * Club domestic league appearances and goals as of 11:25, 27 January 2024

Yusuke Hoshino (星野 有亮, Hoshino Yusuke; born May 12, 1992 in Tokyo) is a Japanese former football player who last played for Gainare Tottori.

== Career ==
Yusuke made his league debut for Zweigen against Ehime on the 1 April 2015. He scored his first league goal for the club against Cerezo Osaka on the 8 November 2015, in the 57th minute.

Yusuke made his league debut for Gainare against Kagoshima United on the 11 March 2018.

== Club statistics ==
Updated to 23 February 2020.

Club performance			League		Cup		Total	
Season	Club	League	Apps	Goals	Apps	Goals	Apps	Goals
Japan			League		Emperor's Cup		Total	
2015	Zweigen Kanazawa	J2 League	17	1	1	0	18	1
2016	Zweigen Kanazawa	J2 League	8	0	1	0	9	0
2017	Zweigen Kanazawa	J2 League	0	0	0	0	0	0
2017	Gainare Tottori	J3 League	27	0	2	0	29	0
2017	Gainare Tottori	J3 League	25	0	2	0	27	0
Total			77	1	6	0	83	1
