= Masaya Yamamoto =

Japanese footballer

Personal information
- Full name: Masaya Yamamoto
- Date of birth: 23 October 1991 (age 35)
- Place of birth: Shizuoka, Japan
- Height: 1.73 m (5 ft 8 in)
- Position: Midfielder

Team information
- Current team: YSCC Yokohama
- Number: 7

Youth career
- –2003: Nishi Mashizu SC
- 2004–2006: Fujieda Meisei SC
- 2007–2009: Fujieda Meisei High School

College career
Years	Team	Apps	(Gls)
2010–2013	Kanto Gakuin University		

Senior career*
Years	Team	Apps	(Gls)
2014–	YSCC Yokohama	58	(3)
- * Club domestic league appearances and goals as of 23 February 2016

Masaya Yamamoto (山本真也, Yamamoto, Masaya; born 23 October 1991 in Shizuoka) is a Japanese footballer who plays for YSCC Yokohama.

== Club statistics ==
Updated to 23 February 2016.

Club performance			League		Cup		Total	
Season	Club	League	Apps	Goals	Apps	Goals	Apps	Goals
Japan			League		Emperor's Cup		Total	
2014	YSCC Yokohama	J3 League	27	2	2	0	29	2
2015	YSCC Yokohama	J3 League	31	1	–		31	1
Career total			58	3	2	0	60	3
