= Seiji Kawakami =

Japanese footballer

Seiji Kawakami 川上 盛司
Personal information
- Full name: Seiji Kawakami
- Date of birth: June 20, 1995 (age 31)
- Place of birth: Tochigi, Japan
- Height: 1.71 m (5 ft 7 1/2 in)
- Position: Right midfielder

Team information
- Current team: Wollongong United

Youth career
- 2014–2017: Kashima Antlers
- 2014–2017: Sendai University

Senior career*
Years	Team	Apps	(Gls)
2017	Fukushima United FC	2	(0)
2018–2019	Tochigi SC	0	(0)
2018	→ Fujieda MYFC (loan)	16	(0)
2019	→ SC Sagamihara (loan)	31	(1)
2020–	Wollongong United	17	(0)
- * Club domestic league appearances and goals as of 19:33, 17 April 2021 (UTC)

Seiji Kawakami (川上 盛司, Kawakami Seiji; born June 20, 1995) is a Japanese footballer who plays for Wollongong United FC.

== Career ==
Seiji Kawakami joined J3 League club Fukushima United FC in 2017.

== Club statistics ==
Updated to 22 February 2018.

Club performance			League		Cup		Total	
Season	Club	League	Apps	Goals	Apps	Goals	Apps	Goals
Japan			League		Emperor's Cup		Total	
2017	Fukushima United FC	J3 League	2	0	0	0	2	0
Total			2	0	0	0	2	0
