= Sota Sato =

Japanese footballer

Sota Sato 佐藤 颯汰
Personal information
- Full name: Sota Sato
- Date of birth: April 21, 1999 (age 27)
- Place of birth: Miyazaki, Japan
- Height: 1.73 m (5 ft 8 in)
- Position: Forward

Team information
- Current team: Tegevajaro Miyazaki
- Number: 16

Youth career
- 2015–2017: Nissho Gakuen High School

Senior career*
Years	Team	Apps	(Gls)
2018–2022	Giravanz Kitakyushu	25	(3)
2023-	Tegevajaro Miyazaki	8	(0)
Total		33	(3)
- * Club domestic league appearances and goals as of 19 January 2024 @ 10:17(AEST)

Sota Sato (佐藤 颯汰, Satō Sōta; born April 21, 1999) is a Japanese football player for Tegevajaro Miyazaki.

== Career ==
After attending Nissho Gakuen High School, Nakayama joined Giravanz Kitakyushu in December 2017.

== Club statistics ==
Updated to 29 August 2018.

Club performance			League		Cup		Total	
Season	Club	League	Apps	Goals	Apps	Goals	Apps	Goals
Japan			League		Emperor's Cup		Total	
2018	Giravanz Kitakyushu	J3 League	2	1	0	0	2	1
Total			2	1	0	0	2	1
