= Filip Wichman =

Polish footballer

Personal information
- Full name: Filip Wichman
- Date of birth: 30 January 1994 (age 32)
- Place of birth: Gdańsk, Poland
- Height: 1.88 m (6 ft 2 in)
- Position: Goalkeeper

Youth career
- Gedania Gdańsk
- Lechia Gdańsk
- Bałtyk Gdynia

Senior career*
Years	Team	Apps	(Gls)
2010–2011	Bałtyk Gdynia	0	(0)
2011–2013	Gwarek Zabrze		
2013–2014	MKS Oława	32	(0)
2014	Odra Opole	10	(0)
2015	Gryf Wejherowo	4	(0)
2016	Concordia Elbląg	13	(0)
2017	YSCC Yokohama	9	(0)
2018	Raków Częstochowa	0	(0)
2019	Ogniwo Sopot	2	(0)
- * Club domestic league appearances and goals

Filip Wichman (born 30 January 1994) is a Polish former professional footballer who played as a goalkeeper. Besides Poland, he has played in Japan.

== Club career ==
Wichman joined Japanese side YSCC Yokohama in early 2017.

== Honours ==
Odra Opole

- Polish Cup (Opole regionals): 2014–15
