= Ryota Watanabe =

Japanese footballer

Personal information
- Full name: Ryota Watanabe
- Date of birth: 11 March 1991 (age 35)
- Place of birth: Tokyo, Japan
- Height: 1.90 m (6 ft 3 in)
- Position: Forward

Team information
- Current team: Japan Soccer College
- Number: 10

Youth career
- 2006–2008: Chofu Kita High School

College career
Years	Team	Apps	(Gls)
2009–2012	Nippon Sport Science University		

Senior career*
Years	Team	Apps	(Gls)
2013–2016	Ehime FC	70	(4)
2016	→ Nagano Parceiro (loan)	19	(2)
2017	Azul Claro Numazu	26	(3)
2018–2019	Fujieda MYFC	18	(1)
2019–	Japan Soccer College	36	(15)
- * Club domestic league appearances and goals as of 24 September 2022

Ryota Watanabe (渡辺 亮太, Watanabe Ryōta; born 11 March 1991) is a Japanese footballer who plays for Japan Soccer College.

== Club statistics ==
Updated to 23 February 2018.

Club performance			League		Cup		Total	
Season	Club	League	Apps	Goals	Apps	Goals	Apps	Goals
Japan			League		Emperor's Cup		Total	
2013	Ehime FC	J2 League	24	1	1	0	25	1
2014	Ehime FC	J2 League	31	3	2	0	33	3
2015	Ehime FC	J2 League	15	0	2	0	17	0
2016	Nagano Parceiro	J3 League	19	2	1	0	20	2
2017	Azul Claro Numazu	J3 League	26	3	2	0	28	3
Career total			115	9	8	0	123	9
