= Takuya Iwata (footballer, born 1994) =

Japanese footballer

Takuya Iwata 岩田 拓也
Personal information
- Full name: Takuya Iwata
- Date of birth: July 14, 1994 (age 32)
- Place of birth: Kodaira, Tokyo, Japan
- Height: 1.77 m (5 ft 9 1/2 in)
- Position: Forward

Team information
- Current team: Thespakusatsu Gunma
- Number: 20

Youth career
- 2007–2012: FC Tokyo Youth
- 2013–2016: Meiji University

Senior career*
Years	Team	Apps	(Gls)
2017–	Thespakusatsu Gunma	12	(0)
2017	→ SC Sagamihara (loan)	13	(2)
- * Club domestic league appearances and goals as of 22 August 2018

Takuya Iwata (岩田 拓也, Iwata Takuya; born July 14, 1994) is a Japanese football player. He plays for SC Sagamihara.

== Career ==
Takuya Iwata joined the J2 League club Thespakusatsu Gunma in 2017. In July, he moved to the J3 League club SC Sagamihara.

== Club statistics ==
Updated to 22 August 2018.

Club performance			League		Cup		Total	
Season	Club	League	Apps	Goals	Apps	Goals	Apps	Goals
Japan			League		Emperor's Cup		Total	
2017	Thespakusatsu Gunma	J2 League	0	0	0	0	0	0
2017	SC Sagamihara	J3 League	13	2	–		13	2
2018	Thespakusatsu Gunma	J3 League	12	0	0	0	12	0
Total			25	2	0	0	25	2
