= Nobuyuki Kawashima =

Japanese footballer

Nobuyuki Kawashima 川島 將
Personal information
- Full name: Nobuyuki Kawashima
- Date of birth: February 4, 1992 (age 34)
- Place of birth: Tokyo, Japan
- Height: 1.83 m (6 ft 0 in)
- Position: Defender

Team information
- Current team: Fujieda MYFC
- Number: 2

Youth career
- 2007–2009: Higashikurume Sogo High School

College career
Years	Team	Apps	(Gls)
2010–2013	Tokyo International University		

Senior career*
Years	Team	Apps	(Gls)
2014	Tochigi Uva FC	25	(0)
2015–2016	Thespakusatsu Gunma	11	(0)
2016	→ Fujieda MYFC (loan)	12	(1)
2017	Fujieda MYFC	31	(3)
2018	Giravanz Kitakyushu	18	(0)
2019–	Fujieda MYFC	173	(4)
- * Club domestic league appearances and goals as of 1 January 2026

Nobuyuki Kawashima (川島 將, Kawashima Nobuyuki; born February 4, 1992) is a Japanese professional footballer who plays as a defender for Fujieda MYFC player.

== Playing career ==
Nobuyuki Kawashima joined to Tochigi Uva FC in 2014. In 2015, he moved to Thespakusatsu Gunma. In July 2016, he moved to Fujieda MYFC.

== Club statistics ==
Updated to 23 February 2018.

Club performance			League		Cup		Total	
Season	Club	League	Apps	Goals	Apps	Goals	Apps	Goals
Japan			League		Emperor's Cup		Total	
2014	Tochigi Uva FC	JFL	25	0	1	0	26	0
2015	Thespakusatsu Gunma	J2 League	10	0	1	0	11	0
2016	Thespakusatsu Gunma	J2 League	1	0	–		1	0
2016	Fujieda MYFC	J3 League	12	1	–		12	1
2017	Fujieda MYFC	J3 League	31	3	–		31	3
Total			79	4	2	0	81	4
