= Kengo Ota =

Japanese footballer (born 1995)

Kengo Ota 太田賢吾
Personal information
- Full name: Kengo Ota
- Date of birth: November 16, 1995 (age 30)
- Place of birth: Kawasaki, Kanagawa, Japan
- Height: 1.81 m (5 ft 11 1/2 in)
- Position: Defender

Team information
- Current team: Veertien Mie
- Number: 3

Youth career
- 2008–2013: Kawasaki Frontale Youth
- 2014–2017: Osaka University of Health and Sport Sciences

Senior career*
Years	Team	Apps	(Gls)
2018–	Iwate Grulla Morioka	28	(1)
2020	Veertien Mie		
- * Club domestic league appearances and goals as of 2 February 2020

Kengo Ota (太田賢吾, Ota Kengo; born November 16, 1995) is a Japanese football player for Veertien Mie.

== Career ==
After attending Osaka University of Health and Sport Sciences, Ota joined Grulla Morioka in January 2018.

== Club statistics ==
Updated to February 2nd, 2020.

Club performance			League		Cup		Total	
Season	Club	League	Apps	Goals	Apps	Goals	Apps	Goals
Japan			League		Emperor's Cup		Total	
2018	Iwate Grulla Morioka	J3 League	12	0	0	0	12	0
2019	Iwate Grulla Morioka	J3 League	16	1	0	0	16	1
Total			28	1	0	0	28	1
