= Ryu Kawakami =

Japanese footballer

Ryu Kawakami 川上 竜
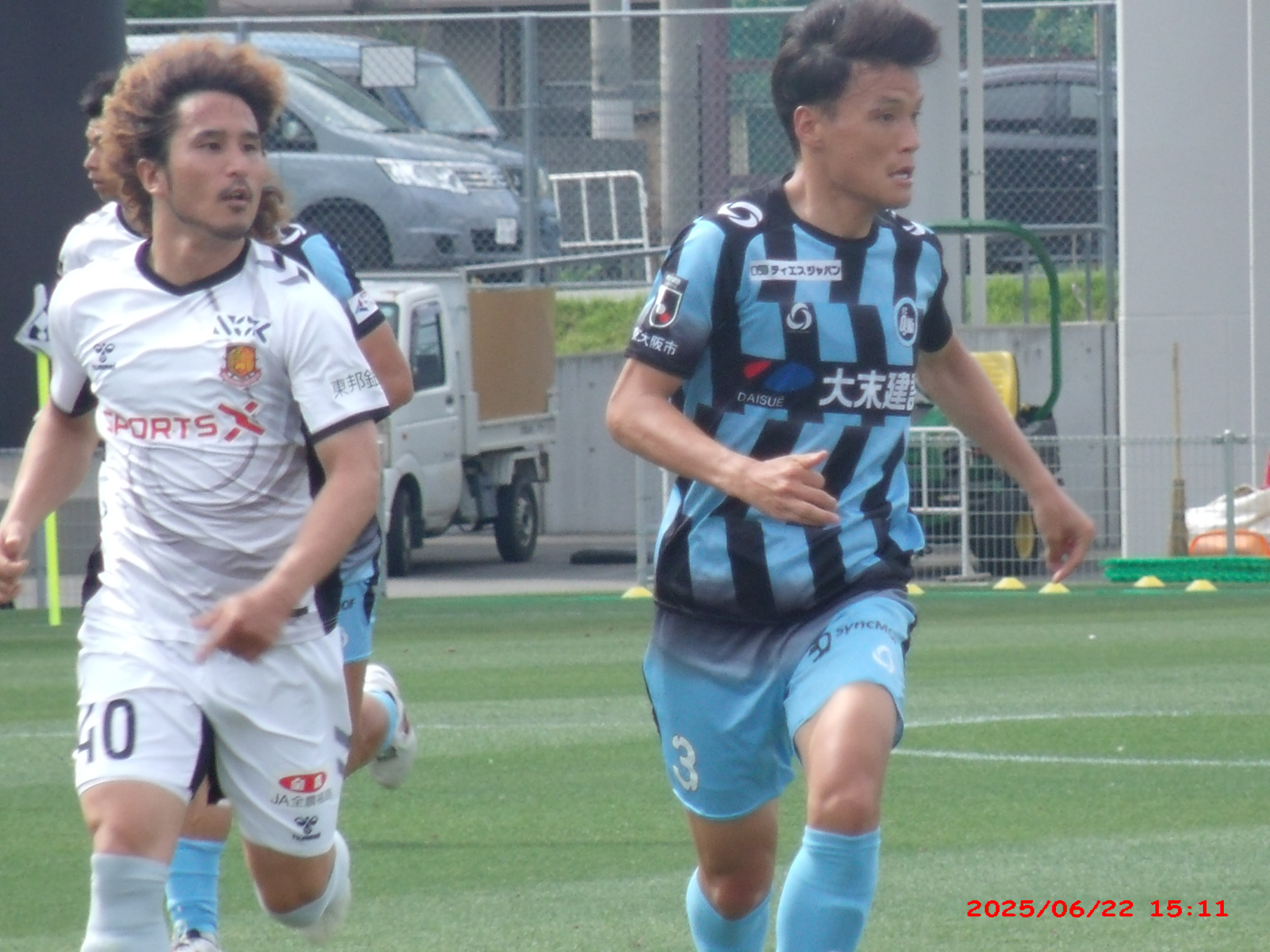

Personal information
- Full name: Ryu Kawakami
- Date of birth: October 25, 1994 (age 32)
- Place of birth: Fukuoka, Japan
- Height: 1.77 m (5 ft 9 1/2 in)
- Position: Midfielder

Team information
- Current team: Zweigen Kanazawa (on loan from FC Osaka)
- Number: 40

Youth career
- –2012: Avispa Fukuoka

College career
Years	Team	Apps	(Gls)
2013–2016	Fukuoka University		

Senior career*
Years	Team	Apps	(Gls)
2017	Fukushima United FC	32	(0)
2018–2020	Giravanz Kitakyushu	76	(1)
2021-2023	SC Sagamihara	67	(1)
2023–2024	FC Gifu	64	(0)
2025–	FC Osaka	58	(3)
2026–	→ Zweigen Kanazawa (loan)	2	(0)
- * Club domestic league appearances and goals as of 21 August 2026

Ryu Kawakami (川上 竜, Kawakami Ryu; born October 25, 1994) is a Japanese football player who plays for Zweigen Kanazawa, on loan from FC Osaka.

== Career ==
Ryu Kawakami joined J3 League club Fukushima United FC in 2017. After a promising debut season in J3 League, he opted to sign for Giravanz Kitakyushu.

== Club statistics ==
Updated to 22 February 2019.

Appearances and goals by club, season and competition
Club	Season	League			Emperor's Cup		Total	
Club	Season	Division	Apps	Goals	Apps	Goals	Apps	Goals
Fukushima United FC	2017	J3 League	32	0	–		32	0
Giravanz Kitakyushu	2018	J3 League	30	1	0	0	30	1
Total			62	1	0	0	62	1
