= Ryota Iwabuchi =

Japanese footballer

Ryota Iwabuchi 岩渕良太
Personal information
- Full name: Ryota Iwabuchi
- Date of birth: April 26, 1990 (age 36)
- Place of birth: Musashino, Tokyo, Japan
- Height: 1.74 m (5 ft 8 1/2 in)
- Positions: Midfielder; forward

Team information
- Current team: FC Ryukyu
- Number: 8

Youth career
- –2002: Sekimae SC
- 2003–2008: FC Tokyo

College career
Years	Team	Apps	(Gls)
2009–2012	Meiji University		

Senior career*
Years	Team	Apps	(Gls)
2013–2015	Matsumoto Yamaga	2	(0)
2014	→ Renofa Yamaguchi (loan)	25	(0)
2015	→ FC Ryukyu (loan)	32	(4)
2016	SC Sagamihara	29	(7)
2017	Grulla Morioka	24	(1)
2018–2024	Fujieda MYFC	136	(26)
2024–	FC Ryukyu	46	(2)
- * Club domestic league appearances and goals as of 1 January 2026

Ryota Iwabuchi (岩渕 良太, Iwabuchi Ryota; born April 26, 1990) is a Japanese football player who plays for J3 League club FC Ryukyu as a midfielder.

== Career ==
Iwabuchi attended Meiji University from 2009 to 2012. With Toyofumi Sakano, he was recognised as one of the best prospects in the country.

Born as forward, he developed into a side-midfielder. After university, he signed for Matsumoto Yamaga before being loaned first to JFL-side Renofa Yamaguchi, then to J3 FC Ryūkyū.

From January 2016, he moved definitely to SC Sagamihara.

== Career statistics ==
Updated to 23 February 2018.

Appearances and goals by club, season and competition
Club	Season	League			Emperor's Cup		Total	
Club	Season	Division	Apps	Goals	Apps	Goals	Apps	Goals
Matsumoto Yamaga	2013	J2 League	2	0	0	0	2	0
Renofa Yamaguchi	2014	JFL	25	0	—		25	0
FC Ryukyu	2015	J3 League	32	4	1	0	33	4
SC Sagamihara	2016	J3 League	29	7	–		29	7
Grulla Morioka	2017	J3 League	24	1	2	0	26	1
Career total			112	12	3	0	115	12

== Personal life ==
Iwabuchi has a younger sister, Mana, who is also a professional footballer and has been capped at international level for Japan.
