= Takuya Kakine =

Japanese footballer

Takuya Kakine 垣根拓也
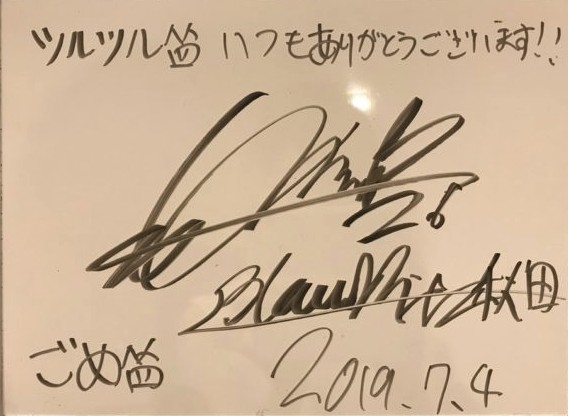

Personal information
- Full name: Takuya Kakine
- Date of birth: 3 October 1991 (age 35)
- Place of birth: Ōtsu, Japan
- Height: 1.73 m (5 ft 8 in)
- Position: Midfielder

Team information
- Current team: Fujieda MYFC
- Number: 14

Youth career
- 2010–2013: Ritsumeikan University

Senior career*
Years	Team	Apps	(Gls)
2014–2016	Machida Zelvia	3	(0)
2016	→ Grulla Morioka (loan)	18	(1)
2017	Grulla Morioka	24	(2)
2018–	Fujieda MYFC	1	(0)
2019	Blaublitz Akita	15	(0)
- * Club domestic league appearances and goals as of 12 March 2018

Takuya Kakine (垣根拓也, Kakine, Takuya; born 3 October 1991 in Ōtsu) is a Japanese footballer who plays for Fujieda MYFC.

== Club statistics ==
Updated to 23 February 2018.

Club performance			League		Cup		Total	
Season	Club	League	Apps	Goals	Apps	Goals	Apps	Goals
Japan			League		Emperor's Cup		Total	
2014	Machida Zelvia	J3 League	2	0	–		2	0
2015	Machida Zelvia	J3 League	1	0	2	0	3	0
2016	Grulla Morioka	J3 League	18	1	3	0	21	1
2017	Grulla Morioka	J3 League	24	2	2	0	26	2
Career total			45	3	7	0	52	3
