= Shinya Awatari =

Japanese footballer

Shinya Awatari 阿渡真也
Personal information
- Full name: Shinya Awatari
- Date of birth: 7 June 1990 (age 36)
- Place of birth: Kanagawa, Japan
- Height: 1.73 m (5 ft 8 in)
- Position: Defender

Team information
- Current team: Fujieda MYFC
- Number: 17

Youth career
- 2006–2008: Kashima Gakuen High School

College career
Years	Team	Apps	(Gls)
2009–2012	Meiji University		

Senior career*
Years	Team	Apps	(Gls)
2013–2017	Zweigen Kanazawa	96	(6)
2018–	Fujieda MYFC	1	(0)
- * Club domestic league appearances and goals as of 12 March 2018

Shinya Awatari (阿渡真也, Awatari Shinya; born 7 June 1990) is a Japanese footballer who plays for Fujieda MYFC.

== Club statistics ==
Updated to 23 February 2018.

Appearances and goals by club, season and competition
Club	Season	League			Emperor's Cup		Total	
Club	Season	Division	Apps	Goals	Apps	Goals	Apps	Goals
Zweigen Kanazawa	2013	JFL	33	5	3	1	36	6
Zweigen Kanazawa	2014	J3 League	29	1	2	0	31	1
Zweigen Kanazawa	2015	J2 League	24	0	1	0	25	0
Zweigen Kanazawa	2016	J2 League	10	0	0	0	10	0
Zweigen Kanazawa	2017	J2 League	0	0	0	0	0	0
Career total			96	6	6	1	102	7
