= Wataru Noguchi =

Japanese footballer

Wataru Noguchi 野口 航
Personal information
- Full name: Wataru Noguchi
- Date of birth: January 18, 1996 (age 30)
- Place of birth: Ōita, Japan
- Height: 1.66 m (5 ft 5 1/2 in)
- Position: Midfielder

Team information
- Current team: FC Imabari
- Number: 8

Youth career
- 2011–2013: Ohzu High School

College career
Years	Team	Apps	(Gls)
2014–2017	University of Tsukuba		

Senior career*
Years	Team	Apps	(Gls)
2018–2021	Giravanz Kitakyushu	103	(1)
2022–	FC Imabari	19	(0)
- * Club domestic league appearances and goals as of 1 January 2026

Wataru Noguchi (野口 航, Noguchi Wataru; born January 18, 1996 in Ōita) is a Japanese football player for FC Imabari.

== Playing career ==
After being a protagonist at University of Tsukuba, Noguchi joined Giravanz Kitakyushu in January 2018.
