= 2018 J3 League =

Meiji Yasuda J3 League
- Season: 2018
- Champions: FC Ryukyu (1st title)
- Promoted: FC Ryukyu; Kagoshima United FC
- Matches: 272
- Goals: 722 (2.65 per match)
- Top goalscorer: Leonardo (Gainare Tottori), 24 goals
- Highest attendance: 12,812; Kitakyushu 1–0 Nagano (25 August 2018)
- Lowest attendance: 508; Fujieda 1-2 Kitakyushu (21 March 2018)
- Average attendance: 2,384

The 2018 J3 League (referred to as the 2018 Meiji Yasuda J3 League (2018 明治安田生命J3リーグ) for sponsorship reasons) was the 5th season of J3 League under its current name.

== Clubs ==
Tochigi SC, the 2017 J3 League runners-up, earned promotion to the J2 League after securing another runners-up season; this time, unlike 2016, it was enough to clinch direct promotion. Defending champions are Blaublitz Akita, which became the first club not to gain promotion after winning the championship since J3's inception. Thespakusatsu Gunma was the new entry for the league: it was their first third division season since 2004, when they were promoted to J2 from JFL.

No promotion from Japan Football League came this time. This was another first for the J3 League since its inception.

Club	Location	Venue	Capacity
Azul Claro Numazu	Numazu	Ashitaka Stadium	10,000
Blaublitz Akita	Akita	Akigin Stadium	4,992
Fukushima United FC	Fukushima	Toho Stadium	21,000
Gainare Tottori	Tottori	Bird Stadium	16,033
Giravanz Kitakyushu	Kitakyushu	Kitakyushu Stadium	15,066
Grulla Morioka	Morioka	Iwagin Stadium	4,946
Kagoshima United FC	Kagoshima	Kamoike Stadium	19,934
Kataller Toyama	Toyama	Toyama Athletic Stadium	25,251
Fujieda MYFC	Fujieda	Fujieda Soccer Field	13,000
Nagano Parceiro	Nagano	Nagano U Stadium	15,491
FC Ryukyu	Okinawa	Okinawa Athletic Stadium	25,000
SC Sagamihara	Sagamihara	Gion Stadium	15,300
Thespakusatsu Gunma	All cities/towns in Gunma	Shoda Shoyu Stadium Gunma	15,253
FC Tokyo U-23	Tokyo	Ajinomoto Field Nishigaoka	7,137
YSCC Yokohama	Yokohama	Mitsuzawa Stadium	15,454
Cerezo Osaka U-23	Osaka & Sakai, Osaka	Kincho Stadium	19,904
Gamba Osaka U-23	North cities in Osaka	Panasonic Stadium Suita Expo '70 Commemorative Stadium	39,694 21,000

=== Personnel and kits ===
Club	Manager	Captain	Kit manufacturer
Azul Claro Numazu	(Japan) Ken Yoshida	(Japan) Takuya Sugai	Puma
Blaublitz Akita	(Japan) Koichi Sugiyama	(Japan) Naoyuki Yamada	ATHLETA
Cerezo Osaka U-23	(Japan) Yuji Okuma	none	Puma
Fukushima United	(Japan) Kazuaki Tasaka	(Japan) Takumi Watanabe	hummel
Gainare Tottori	(Japan) Daisuke Sudo	(Brazil) Fernandinho	hummel
Gamba Osaka U-23	(Japan) Tsuneyasu Miyamoto	none	Umbro
Giravanz Kitakyushu	Hitoshi Morishita	(Japan) Ryu Kawakami	bonera
Grulla Morioka	(Japan) Toshimi Kikuchi	(Japan) Kohei Doi	Under Armour
Kagoshima United	(Japan) Yasutoshi Miura	(Japan) Akira Akao	Puma
Kataller Toyama	(Japan) Ryo Adachi	(Japan) Junya Imase	Goldwin
Fujieda MYFC	(Japan) Atsuto Oishi	(Japan) Daiki Asada	gol.
Nagano Parceiro	(Japan) Yuji Sakakura	(Japan) Tomokazu Myojin	Penalty
FC Ryukyu	(North Korea) Kim Jong-song	(North Korea) Park Iru-gyu	sfida
SC Sagamihara	(Japan) Takayuki Nishigaya	(Japan) Yoshikatsu Kawaguchi	gol.
Thespakusatsu Gunma	(Japan) Keiichiro Nuno	(Japan) Tetsuya Funatsu	Finta
FC Tokyo U-23	(Japan) Takayoshi Amma	none	Umbro
YSCC Yokohama	(Japan) Yasuhiro Higuchi	(Japan) Norimasa Nakanishi	SVOLME

=== Managerial changes ===
Team	Outgoing manager	Date of vacancy	Incoming manager	Date of appointment
Kataller Toyama	(Japan) Tetsuro Uki	9 May 2018	(Japan) Ryo Adachi	9 May 2018
Gainare Tottori	(Japan) Ryuzo Morioka	4 June 2018	(Japan) Daisuke Sudo	4 June 2018
Nagano Parceiro	(Japan) Tetsuya Asano	12 June 2018	(Japan) Yuji Sakakura	12 June 2018
Giravanz Kitakyushu	(Japan) Hitoshi Morishita	17 June 2018	(Japan) Tetsuji Hashiratani	20 June 2018
Blaublitz Akita	(Japan) Koichi Sugiyama	11 July 2018	(Japan) Shuichi Mase	11 July 2018
Gamba Osaka U-23	(Japan) Tsuneyasu Miyamoto	23 July 2018	(Japan) Noritada Saneyoshi	23 July 2018
Fujieda MYFC	(Japan) Atsuto Oishi	24 July 2018	(Japan) Nobuhiro Ishizaki	27 July 2018

== League table ==
Pos	Team	Pld	W	D	L	GF	GA	GD	Pts	Promotion
1	FC Ryukyu (C, P)	32	20	6	6	70	40	+30	66	Promotion to 2019 J2 League (Note: Only teams that hold a J2 license are eligible for promotion.)
2	Kagoshima United (P)	32	16	9	7	46	35	+11	57	Promotion to 2019 J2 League
3	Gainare Tottori	32	15	8	9	61	47	+14	53	
4	Azul Claro Numazu	32	14	10	8	40	29	+11	52	
5	Thespakusatsu Gunma	32	15	7	10	37	35	+2	52	
6	Gamba Osaka U-23	32	13	8	11	53	43	+10	47	
7	Cerezo Osaka U-23	32	13	7	12	47	36	+11	46	
8	Blaublitz Akita	32	12	7	13	37	35	+2	43	
9	SC Sagamihara	32	12	6	14	42	53	−11	42	
10	Nagano Parceiro	32	10	11	11	39	37	+2	41	
11	Kataller Toyama	32	12	5	15	41	50	−9	41	
12	Fukushima United	32	9	13	10	36	43	−7	40	
13	Grulla Morioka	32	12	4	16	41	56	−15	40	
14	FC Tokyo U-23	32	10	6	16	38	45	−7	36	
15	YSCC Yokohama	32	8	10	14	40	48	−8	34	
16	Fujieda MYFC	32	10	4	18	32	48	−16	34	
17	Giravanz Kitakyushu	32	6	9	17	22	42	−20	27	

Source: 2018 MEIJI YASUDA J3 LEAGUE League table
Rules for classification: 1) Points; 2) Goal difference; 3) Goals scored; 4th) head-to-head results; 5th) disciplinary points; 6th) draw
(C) Champions; (P) Promoted

== Results table ==
Home \ Away	AZU	BLA	C23	FUK	GAI	G23	GIR	GRU	KGU	KAT	MYF	PAR	RYU	SGM	SPA	T23	YSC
Azul Claro Numazu		2–0	1–1	0–0	1–0	1–2	1–0	1–0	0–0	2–0	2–1	2–3	1–4	0–0	2–0	2–0	1–0
Blaublitz Akita	1–0		1–4	0–1	2–2	1–0	1–1	2–1	1–1	2–2	4–0	1–2	0–1	1–2	0–1	0–0	2–0
Cerezo Osaka U-23	0–0	0–1		1–1	0–4	1–1	1–1	1–2	1–2	0–1	1–2	2–0	6–0	2–1	0–2	2–0	2–0
Fukushima United	1–1	0–2	1–0		3–4	4–3	2–2	0–0	0–0	1–0	2–0	1–1	2–1	2–2	2–1	0–2	0–1
Gainare Tottori	2–2	2–0	1–4	2–1		1–0	1–1	1–0	5–1	2–3	2–1	1–0	1–3	7–0	1–2	4–2	1–4
Gamba Osaka U-23	3–0	2–1	0–2	1–1	2–0		2–1	3–2	0–0	1–1	1–6	1–1	2–0	2–1	4–0	2–4	3–0
Giravanz Kitakyushu	0–2	0–2	1–2	0–0	3–0	0–4		2–1	0–0	2–1	1–1	1–0	1–2	0–4	0–1	0–0	2–3
Grulla Morioka	0–3	2–1	2–1	2–2	3–3	2–1	2–0		1–4	2–1	0–4	3–0	1–4	0–3	1–1	0–2	3–2
Kagoshima United	1–0	2–2	2–1	2–1	0–2	4–1	1–0	1–0		1–2	1–2	2–2	2–1	2–1	0–2	2–1	1–1
Kataller Toyama	0–3	0–4	2–0	0–0	1–1	2–0	2–1	1–3	1–0		4–2	1–2	2–1	2–0	1–2	1–2	1–0
Fujieda MYFC	0–1	0–1	1–2	1–2	0–0	2–1	1–2	2–1	0–2	0–0		1–0	0–1	2–1	1–0	1–1	2–1
Nagano Parceiro	2–2	1–2	1–2	1–1	0–1	2–1	1–1	0–1	1–1	5–0	4–0		1–1	2–1	2–2	1–0	0–1
FC Ryukyu	1–0	0–0	1–1	3–0	2–2	2–1	1–0	5–2	4–0	4–3	3–0	2–0		5–1	4–2	3–2	1–1
SC Sagamihara	2–1	0–1	2–1	1–1	2–4	2–3	1–0	1–0	1–0	1–0	1–0	2–2	2–5		0–1	1–0	1–0
Thespakusatsu Gunma	2–2	1–0	1–0	3–3	1–0	1–0	0–1	1–0	0–2	0–1	2–1	0–1	0–2	1–1		4–1	2–2
FC Tokyo U-23	0–3	1–0	1–3	2–3	0–0	2–2	0–1	2–0	2–3	3–0	2–1	0–1	1–1	3–0	1–2		1–0
YSCC Yokohama	2–2	3–1	1–1	3–0	1–2	0–0	2–3	0–0	0–4	1–2	1–3	0–1	3–2	2–2	0–0	3–1	

Updated to match(es) played on 2 December 2018. Source: J. League Data Site
Legend: Blue = home team win; Yellow = draw; Red = away team win.

== Top scorers ==
As of matches played 2 December 2018.

Rank	Player	Club	Goals
1	(Brazil) Leonardo	Gainare Tottori	24
2	(Brazil) João Gabriel	SC Sagamihara	17
3	(Japan) Kazaki Nakagawa	FC Ryukyu	16
3	(Japan) Yuta Togashi	FC Ryukyu	16
5	(Japan) Kaito Taniguchi	Grulla Morioka	15
6	(Japan) Rei Yonezawa	Cerezo Osaka U-23	12
7	(Japan) Koki Oshima	Thespakusatsu Gunma	10
7	(Japan) Yu Tomidokoro	FC Ryukyu	10
9	(Brazil) Fernandinho	Gainare Tottori	9
9	(Japan) Kiichi Yajima	FC Tokyo U-23	9
11	(Japan) Hayate Take	Fukushima United FC	8
11	(Japan) Junki Hata	Azul Claro Numazu	8
11	(Japan) Kazunari Ichimi	Gamba Osaka U-23	8

== Attendances ==
Pos	Team	Total	High	Low	Average	Change
1	Giravanz Kitakyushu	72,014	12,812	2,320	4,501	−24.2%
2	Kagoshima United FC	64,642	10,916	1,703	4,040	+15.2%
3	Nagano Parceiro	56,869	7,082	2,679	3,554	−16.5%
4	SC Sagamihara	55,331	12,612	1,602	3,458	−5.4%
5	Thespakusatsu Gunma	53,531	4,700	1,604	3,346	−12.7%^{†}
6	FC Ryukyu	50,330	7,810	886	3,146	+25.4%
7	Azul Claro Numazu	45,716	5,687	1,271	2,857	−5.7%
8	Blaublitz Akita	45,420	11,802	831	2,839	+20.1%
9	Kataller Toyama	42,718	4,124	1,602	2,670	−15.5%
10	Gainare Tottori	42,519	4,817	1,302	2,657	+70.4%
11	FC Tokyo U-23	27,564	2,563	934	1,723	−10.9%
12	Fukushima United FC	25,214	3,199	671	1,576	+6.1%
13	Gamba Osaka U-23	22,107	3,753	568	1,382	+12.7%
14	Fujieda MYFC	20,360	2,592	508	1,273	−12.1%
15	Grulla Morioka	19,461	3,115	515	1,216	−9.1%
16	Cerezo Osaka U-23	17,784	4,551	509	1,112	+22.3%
17	YSCC Yokohama	16,077	1,509	546	1,005	+5.7%
	League total	677,657	12,812	508	2,491	−4.7%

Updated to games played on 2 December 2018
Source: J. League Data
Notes:
^{†} Relegated from J2.
