= 2017 J3 League =

Meiji Yasuda J3 League
- Season: 2017
- Champions: Blaublitz Akita; 1st title
- Promoted: Tochigi SC
- Matches: 272
- Goals: 698 (2.57 per match)
- Top goalscorer: Noriaki Fujimoto (Kagoshima United FC) (24 goals)
- Highest attendance: 14,935; Kitakyushu 1–1 Akita (12 Mar 2017)
- Lowest attendance: 273; C-Osaka U-23 2-2 YS Yokohama (22 Oct 2017)
- Average attendance: 2,613

The 2017 J3 League (referred to as the 2017 Meiji Yasuda J3 League (2017 明治安田生命J3リーグ) for sponsorship reasons) was the 4th season of the J3 League under its current name. The fixtures were announced on 26 January 2017. The 2017 season started on 11 March, then ended on 3 December.

Blaublitz Akita won their first title as a J.League club.

== Clubs ==
Locations of the 2017 J3 League teams

A total of 17 teams took part in the league. 2016 J3 League champion Oita Trinita gained promotion to the J2 League, and was replaced by Giravanz Kitakyushu, that finished last in the 2016 J2 League. Oita made an immediate return to the J2 League after being relegated in 2015. Kitakyushu competed in the third tier for the first time under the J3 League name. Azul Claro Numazu made their debut in the third tier as a club.

Club	Location	Venue	Capacity
Azul Claro Numazu	Numazu	Ashitaka Stadium	10,000
Blaublitz Akita	Akita	Akigin Stadium	4,992
Cerezo Osaka U-23	Osaka	Kincho Stadium	19,904
Fukushima United	Fukushima	Toho Stadium	21,000
Gamba Osaka U-23	Suita	Osaka Expo '70 Stadium	21,000
Gainare Tottori	Tottori	Bird Stadium	16,033
Giravanz Kitakyushu	Kitakyushu	Kitakyushu Stadium	15,066
Grulla Morioka	Morioka	Iwagin Stadium	4,946
Kagoshima United	Kagoshima	Kamoike Stadium	19,934
Kataller Toyama	Toyama	Toyama Athletic Stadium	25,251
Fujieda MYFC	Fujieda	Fujieda Soccer Field	13,000
Nagano Parceiro	Nagano	Nagano U Stadium	15,491
FC Ryukyu	Okinawa	Okinawa Athletic Stadium	25,000
SC Sagamihara	Sagamihara	Gion Stadium	15,300
Tochigi SC	Utsunomiya	Green Stadium	18,025
FC Tokyo U-23	Tokyo	Ajinomoto Field Nishigaoka	7,137
YSCC Yokohama	Yokohama	Mitsuzawa Stadium	15,454

=== Personnel and kits ===
Club	Manager	Captain	Kit manufacturer
Azul Claro Numazu	(Japan) Ken Yoshida	(Japan) Eiichiro Ozaki	Puma
Blaublitz Akita	(Japan) Koichi Sugiyama	(Japan) Naoyuki Yamada	ATHLETA
Cerezo Osaka U-23	(Japan) Yuji Okuma	none	Puma
Fukushima United	(Japan) Kazuaki Tasaka	(Japan) Takumi Watanabe	hummel
Gainare Tottori	(Japan) Ryuzo Morioka	(Japan) Takuya Sugimoto	hummel
Gamba Osaka U-23	(Japan) Tsuneyasu Miyamoto	none	Umbro
Giravanz Kitakyushu	(Japan) Takeo Harada	(Japan) Tomoki Ikemoto	bonera
Grulla Morioka	(Japan) Toshimi Kikuchi	(Japan) Kohei Doi	Under Armour
Kagoshima United	(Japan) Yasutoshi Miura	(Japan) Akira Akao	mitre
Kataller Toyama	(Japan) Tetsuro Uki	(Japan) Ryo Kubota	Goldwin
Fujieda MYFC	(Japan) Atsuto Oishi	(Japan) Tadayo Fukuo	gol.
Nagano Parceiro	(Japan) Tetsuya Asano	(Japan) Tomokazu Myojin	Penalty
FC Ryukyu	(North Korea) Kim Jong-song	(Japan) Noritaka Fujisawa	sfida
SC Sagamihara	(Japan) Sotaro Yasunaga	(Japan) Yoshikatsu Kawaguchi	gol.
Tochigi SC	(Japan) Yuji Yokoyama	(Japan) Koji Hirose	ATHLETA
F.C. Tokyo U-23	(Japan) Tadashi Nakamura	none	Umbro
YSCC Yokohama	(Japan) Yasuhiro Higuchi	(Japan) Masao Tsuji	SVOLME

== Results ==
=== League table ===
Pos	Team	Pld	W	D	L	GF	GA	GD	Pts	Promotion
1	Blaublitz Akita (C)	32	18	7	7	53	31	+22	61	Ineligible for promotion to 2018 J2 League
2	Tochigi SC (P)	32	16	12	4	44	24	+20	60	Promotion to 2018 J2 League (Note: Only teams that hold a J2 license are eligible for promotion.)
3	Azul Claro Numazu	32	16	11	5	60	27	+33	59	
4	Kagoshima United	32	17	4	11	49	37	+12	55	
5	Nagano Parceiro	32	13	11	8	34	25	+9	50	
6	FC Ryukyu	32	13	11	8	44	36	+8	50	
7	Fujieda MYFC	32	12	11	9	50	43	+7	47	
8	Kataller Toyama	32	13	8	11	37	33	+4	47	
9	Giravanz Kitakyushu	32	13	7	12	44	37	+7	46	
10	Fukushima United	32	13	4	15	39	43	−4	43	
11	FC Tokyo U-23	32	12	7	13	36	47	−11	43	
12	SC Sagamihara	32	9	12	11	34	41	−7	39	
13	Cerezo Osaka U-23	32	8	11	13	39	43	−4	35	
14	YSCC Yokohama	32	8	8	16	41	54	−13	32	
15	Grulla Morioka	32	7	8	17	32	49	−17	29	
16	Gamba Osaka U-23	32	7	5	20	31	65	−34	26	
17	Gainare Tottori	32	4	9	19	31	63	−32	21	

Source: 2017 MEIJI YASUDA J3 LEAGUE League table
Rules for classification: 1) Points; 2) Goal difference; 3) Goals scored; 4th) head-to-head results; 5th) disciplinary points; 6th) draw
(C) Champions; (P) Promoted

=== Results table ===
Home \ Away	AZU	BLA	C23	FUK	GAI	G23	GIR	GRU	KGU	KAT	MYF	PAR	RYU	SGM	TOC	T23	YSC
Azul Claro Numazu		0–1	1–0	1–2	1–1	4–0	1–0	1–0	2–0	2–0	4–1	1–1	1–0	1–2	1–1	5–0	1–1
Blaublitz Akita	0–2		0–3	2–1	3–1	1–0	2–0	1–0	1–0	1–1	3–0	0–0	1–2	1–0	1–2	1–1	4–3
Cerezo Osaka U-23	1–4	1–3		2–1	2–0	3–2	2–2	2–2	1–3	1–1	0–0	0–0	1–2	2–2	0–1	0–1	2–2
Fukushima United	0–0	0–2	3–2		2–0	0–1	0–3	3–1	2–1	0–1	1–2	2–0	1–0	1–1	0–2	2–2	3–0
Gainare Tottori	2–2	0–3	1–3	1–2		0–0	3–4	2–2	1–2	0–1	1–6	1–0	2–3	1–2	1–1	0–6	1–2
Gamba Osaka U-23	2–3	2–1	0–0	1–2	0–2		2–2	1–0	0–0	0–2	1–6	0–2	1–7	0–1	3–2	4–3	1–2
Giravanz Kitakyushu	0–0	1–1	1–0	0–1	2–0	2–1		5–1	0–4	0–2	0–1	1–2	2–0	3–0	3–2	1–0	3–2
Grulla Morioka	2–1	1–3	2–3	5–1	1–2	0–2	0–3		0–0	0–3	1–0	0–0	0–0	0–2	1–2	0–0	0–1
Kagoshima United	1–2	1–1	0–1	2–1	2–1	1–0	2–1	1–0		2–1	5–0	2–1	0–1	5–2	1–5	3–0	1–0
Kataller Toyama	0–3	0–4	2–0	0–0	1–1	2–0	2–1	0–2	1–0		4–2	1–2	0–0	2–0	1–2	1–2	1–0
Fujieda MYFC	2–2	3–0	1–0	2–0	1–1	2–1	2–0	1–1	1–1	1–1		4–2	1–2	1–1	2–2	2–1	1–1
Nagano Parceiro	1–0	1–2	1–1	0–1	3–0	3–0	1–1	1–1	2–1	1–0	0–3		1–0	1–0	0–0	0–0	3–0
FC Ryukyu	2–2	1–6	1–0	2–1	2–1	3–0	0–0	1–2	0–1	1–0	2–2	1–1		1–1	0–0	1–1	2–1
SC Sagamihara	2–2	1–1	1–3	2–1	1–1	2–2	1–0	1–1	1–3	3–2	1–0	0–1	0–0		1–0	0–0	1–2
Tochigi SC	2–1	0–1	1–0	2–1	1–1	2–0	0–0	3–2	2–1	1–1	0–0	0–0	0–0	1–0		4–1	1–0
FC Tokyo U-23	1–6	1–1	2–1	1–1	1–0	1–0	1–2	3–1	1–2	0–2	2–0	1–0	0–3	1–0	0–1		0–3
YSCC Yokohama	1–4	2–1	2–2	0–2	1–2	2–1	3–4	1–2	4–1	1–1	1–1	1–3	2–2	0–0	0–2	0–1	

Updated to match(es) played on 3 December 2017. Source: J. League data site
Legend: Blue = home team win; Yellow = draw; Red = away team win.

== Season statistics ==
=== Top scorers ===
As of match played 3 December 2017.

Rank	Player	Club	Goals
1	(Japan) Noriaki Fujimoto	Kagoshima United FC	24
2	(Japan) Takuma Sonoda	Azul Claro Numazu	19
3	(Japan) Tomoki Ikemoto	Giravanz Kitakyushu	16
4	(Japan) Tomohiro Tanaka	Blaublitz Akita	15
5	(Japan) Masao Tsuji	YSCC Yokohama	14
6	(Japan) Yu Tomidokoro	FC Ryukyu	13
6	(Japan) Yuichiro Edamoto	Fujieda MYFC	13
8	(Japan) Keisuke Endo	Fujieda MYFC	12
9	(Japan) Junya Kato	Gainare Tottori	11
10	(Japan) Ken Hisatomi	Blaublitz Akita	10

== Attendances ==
Pos	Team	Total	High	Low	Average	Change
1	Giravanz Kitakyushu	95,023	14,935	3,864	5,939	+84.2%^{†}
2	Tochigi SC	82,352	11,191	2,758	5,147	+4.7%
3	Nagano Parceiro	68,095	8,049	2,652	4,256	−15.2%
4	SC Sagamihara	58,517	6,122	1,548	3,657	−15.8%
5	Kagoshima United	56,128	5,157	1,854	3,508	−4.3%
6	Kataller Toyama	50,536	6,383	1,917	3,159	−12.4%
7	Azul Claro Numazu	48,462	8,649	753	3,029	+29.9%^{‡}
8	FC Ryukyu	40,132	6,888	1,032	2,508	+60.7%
9	Blaublitz Akita	37,819	3,933	1,355	2,364	−2.5%
10	FC Tokyo U-23	30,923	6,338	864	1,933	−30.9%
11	Gainare Tottori	24,938	2,435	573	1,559	−17.9%
12	Fukushima United	23,762	3,897	629	1,485	−11.5%
13	Fujieda MYFC	23,162	2,577	722	1,448	−5.4%
14	Grulla Morioka	21,385	3,590	520	1,337	+12.5%
15	Gamba Osaka U-23	19,620	2,317	523	1,226	−48.9%
16	YSCC Yokohama	15,222	1,264	559	951	−6.6%
17	Cerezo Osaka U-23	14,545	1,653	273	909	−38.9%
	League total	710,621	14,935	273	2,613	−11.6%

Updated to games played on 3 December 2017
Source: J. League Data
Notes:
^{†} Relegated from J2. ^{‡} Promoted from JFL.
