= 2016 Fujieda MYFC season =

Fujieda MYFC
2016 season
- Manager: Atsuto Oishi
- Stadium: Fujieda Soccer Stadium
- J3 League: 7th
Home colours	Away colours

2016 Fujieda MYFC season.

== Squad ==
As of 25 February 2016. Note: Flags indicate national team as defined under FIFA eligibility rules; some limited exceptions apply. Players may hold more than one non-FIFA nationality.

No.	Pos.	Nation	Player
1	GK	JPN	Takanori Miyake
3	DF	JPN	Hiroki Narabayashi
4	FW	JPN	Mitsuru Mansho
5	DF	JPN	Daiki Asada
6	DF	JPN	Tadayo Fukuo
7	MF	JPN	Yuichiro Edamoto
8	DF	JPN	Takumi Hashimoto
9	FW	JPN	Keisuke Endo
10	MF	JPN	Nozomi Osako
11	FW	JPN	Hayato Mine
13	FW	JPN	Hirochika Miyoshi
14	MF	JPN	Kento Nakanishi
15	MF	JPN	Naoto Hiraishi
16	MF	JPN	Kota Sameshima

No.	Pos.	Nation	Player
17	DF	JPN	Ryuji Mochizuki
18	MF	JPN	Takuya Mihashi
19	MF	JPN	Ryosuke Ochi
20	MF	JPN	Ryosuke Kakigi
22	DF	JPN	Ryosuke Hisadomi
23	DF	JPN	Yujiro Haraguchi
24	MF	JPN	Hiroki Sasaki
25	MF	JPN	Takashi Soeda
26	GK	JPN	Syuhei Yamada
27	FW	JPN	Hiroki Waki
30	DF	JPN	Koichi Maeda
31	MF	JPN	Sho Aoki
33	DF	JPN	Shota Fujisaki

== J3 League ==
=== League table ===
Pos	Team	Pld	W	D	L	GF	GA	GD	Pts
4	Blaublitz Akita	30	14	8	8	37	26	+11	50
5	Kagoshima United	30	15	5	10	39	29	+10	50
6	Kataller Toyama	30	13	10	7	37	29	+8	49
7	Fujieda MYFC	30	14	3	13	48	42	+6	45
8	FC Ryukyu	30	12	8	10	46	46	0	44
9	Gamba Osaka U-23	30	10	8	12	42	41	+1	38
10	FC Tokyo U-23	30	9	9	12	32	31	+1	36

Updated to match(es) played on 20 November 2016. Source: 2016 MEIJI YASUDA J3 LEAGUE League table
Rules for classification: 1) Points; 2) Goal difference; 3) Goals scored; 4th) head-to-head results; 5th) disciplinary points; 6th) draw

=== Match details ===
J3 League match details
Match	Date	Team	Score	Team	Venue	Attendance
1	2016.03.13	FC Ryukyu	1-0	Fujieda MYFC	Okinawa Athletic Park Stadium	1,311
2	2016.03.20	Fujieda MYFC	1-0	Cerezo Osaka U-23	Fujieda Soccer Stadium	1,620
3	2016.04.03	Tochigi SC	2-0	Fujieda MYFC	Tochigi Green Stadium	3,509
4	2016.04.10	AC Nagano Parceiro	2-1	Fujieda MYFC	Minami Nagano Sports Park Stadium	3,906
5	2016.04.17	Fujieda MYFC	4-0	YSCC Yokohama	Fujieda Soccer Stadium	904
6	2016.04.24	Fukushima United FC	1-1	Fujieda MYFC	Toho Stadium	1,045
7	2016.05.01	Fujieda MYFC	3-2	Grulla Morioka	Fujieda Soccer Stadium	1,702
8	2016.05.08	Gamba Osaka U-23	2-0	Fujieda MYFC	Expo '70 Commemorative Stadium	1,690
9	2016.05.15	Fujieda MYFC	0-1	SC Sagamihara	Fujieda Soccer Stadium	1,673
10	2016.05.22	Gainare Tottori	1-3	Fujieda MYFC	Tottori Bank Bird Stadium	2,058
11	2016.05.29	Fujieda MYFC	0-2	Oita Trinita	Fujieda Soccer Stadium	1,587
12	2016.06.12	FC Tokyo U-23	1-1	Fujieda MYFC	Ajinomoto Field Nishigaoka	1,777
13	2016.06.19	Fujieda MYFC	2-1	Blaublitz Akita	Fujieda Soccer Stadium	940
14	2016.06.26	Kagoshima United FC	1-0	Fujieda MYFC	Kagoshima Kamoike Stadium	3,262
15	2016.07.03	Fujieda MYFC	2-1	Kataller Toyama	Shizuoka Stadium	1,856
16	2016.07.10	Fujieda MYFC	2-1	FC Tokyo U-23	Fujieda Soccer Stadium	1,707
17	2016.07.16	Oita Trinita	4-3	Fujieda MYFC	Oita Bank Dome	5,972
18	2016.07.24	Fujieda MYFC	4-2	FC Ryukyu	Fujieda Soccer Stadium	1,508
19	2016.07.31	Blaublitz Akita	1-0	Fujieda MYFC	Akigin Stadium	2,002
20	2016.08.07	Fujieda MYFC	3-2	AC Nagano Parceiro	Fujieda Soccer Stadium	1,817
21	2016.09.11	Kataller Toyama	2-0	Fujieda MYFC	Toyama Stadium	3,045
22	2016.09.18	Fujieda MYFC	2-5	Gainare Tottori	Fujieda Soccer Stadium	1,221
23	2016.09.25	Grulla Morioka	1-2	Fujieda MYFC	Iwagin Stadium	923
24	2016.10.01	Cerezo Osaka U-23	2-1	Fujieda MYFC	Yanmar Stadium Nagai	748
25	2016.10.16	Fujieda MYFC	4-0	Gamba Osaka U-23	Shizuoka Stadium	1,198
26	2016.10.23	Fujieda MYFC	1-1	Tochigi SC	Shizuoka Stadium	1,694
27	2016.10.30	YSCC Yokohama	0-3	Fujieda MYFC	Yokohama Mitsuzawa Athletic Stadium	568
28	2016.11.06	Fujieda MYFC	2-0	Kagoshima United FC	Fujieda Soccer Stadium	1,281
29	2016.11.13	SC Sagamihara	3-1	Fujieda MYFC	Sagamihara Gion Stadium	5,522
30	2016.11.20	Fujieda MYFC	2-0	Fukushima United FC	Fujieda Soccer Stadium	2,257
