= 2017 Fujieda MYFC season =

Fujieda MYFC
2017 season
- Manager: Atsuto Oishi
- Stadium: Fujieda Soccer Stadium
- J3 League: 7th
Home colours	Away colours

2017 Fujieda MYFC season.

== Squad ==
As of 15 February 2017. Note: Flags indicate national team as defined under FIFA eligibility rules; some limited exceptions apply. Players may hold more than one non-FIFA nationality.

No.	Pos.	Nation	Player
1	GK	JPN	Takanori Miyake
3	DF	JPN	Yosei Nishimura
4	DF	JPN	Ryuji Ito
5	DF	JPN	Daiki Asada
6	DF	JPN	Tadayo Fukuo
7	MF	JPN	Yuichiro Edamoto
8	DF	JPN	Keisuke Endo
9	FW	JPN	Ryota Doi
10	MF	JPN	Nozomi Osako
11	FW	CAM	Chan Vathanaka (on loan from Boeung Ket Angkor)
13	FW	JPN	Hirochika Miyoshi
14	MF	JPN	Naoto Hiraishi
15	MF	JPN	Taisuke Mizuno
16	MF	JPN	Kota Sameshima

No.	Pos.	Nation	Player
17	MF	JPN	Hirohito Shinohara
18	MF	JPN	Yuki Hatanaka
19	MF	JPN	Ryosuke Ochi
20	MF	JPN	Ryosuke Kakigi
21	GK	JPN	Shun Sato
22	DF	JPN	Ryosuke Hisadomi
23	FW	JPN	Masato Sasaki
25	MF	JPN	Takashi Soeda
26	GK	JPN	Junto Taguchi
27	FW	JPN	Hiroki Waki
28	MF	JPN	Ryuto Otake
29	DF	JPN	Nobuyuki Kawashima
30	DF	JPN	Shota Fujisaki
31	MF	JPN	Sho Aoki

== J3 League ==
=== League table ===
Pos	Team	Pld	W	D	L	GF	GA	GD	Pts
4	Kagoshima United	32	17	4	11	49	37	+12	55
5	Nagano Parceiro	32	13	11	8	34	25	+9	50
6	FC Ryukyu	32	13	11	8	44	36	+8	50
7	Fujieda MYFC	32	12	11	9	50	43	+7	47
8	Kataller Toyama	32	13	8	11	37	33	+4	47
9	Giravanz Kitakyushu	32	13	7	12	44	37	+7	46
10	Fukushima United	32	13	4	15	39	43	−4	43

Source: 2017 MEIJI YASUDA J3 LEAGUE League table
Rules for classification: 1) Points; 2) Goal difference; 3) Goals scored; 4th) head-to-head results; 5th) disciplinary points; 6th) draw

=== Match details ===
J3 League match details
Match	Date	Team	Score	Team	Venue	Attendance
1	2017.03.11	Kagoshima United FC	5-0	Fujieda MYFC	Kagoshima Kamoike Stadium	5,039
2	2017.03.18	Fujieda MYFC	2-1	FC Tokyo U-23	Fujieda Soccer Stadium	1,921
3	2017.03.25	Azul Claro Numazu	4-1	Fujieda MYFC	Ashitaka Park Stadium	2,947
4	2017.04.02	Fujieda MYFC	2-2	Tochigi SC	Fujieda Soccer Stadium	1,402
5	2017.04.16	Grulla Morioka	1-0	Fujieda MYFC	Iwagin Stadium	805
6	2017.04.29	Fujieda MYFC	1-1	Kataller Toyama	Fujieda Soccer Stadium	1,763
7	2017.05.07	Blaublitz Akita	3-0	Fujieda MYFC	Akita Yabase Athletic Field	2,118
9	2017.05.21	Fujieda MYFC	2-0	Giravanz Kitakyushu	Fujieda Soccer Stadium	1,085
10	2017.05.28	Fujieda MYFC	1-2	FC Ryukyu	Fujieda Soccer Stadium	1,141
11	2017.06.04	Fukushima United FC	1-2	Fujieda MYFC	Toho Stadium	1,172
12	2017.06.10	Fujieda MYFC	1-1	Gainare Tottori	Fujieda Soccer Stadium	1,149
13	2017.06.18	SC Sagamihara	1-0	Fujieda MYFC	Sagamihara Gion Stadium	2,347
14	2017.06.25	Fujieda MYFC	1-0	Cerezo Osaka U-23	Shizuoka Stadium	1,214
15	2017.07.02	AC Nagano Parceiro	0-3	Fujieda MYFC	Minami Nagano Sports Park Stadium	3,697
16	2017.07.09	Fujieda MYFC	2-1	Gamba Osaka U-23	Fujieda Soccer Stadium	1,688
17	2017.07.16	YSCC Yokohama	1-1	Fujieda MYFC	NHK Spring Mitsuzawa Football Stadium	740
18	2017.07.22	Fujieda MYFC	2-0	Fukushima United FC	Fujieda Soccer Stadium	1,264
19	2017.08.19	Giravanz Kitakyushu	0-1	Fujieda MYFC	Mikuni World Stadium Kitakyushu	3,868
21	2017.09.02	Fujieda MYFC	1-1	Kagoshima United FC	Fujieda Soccer Stadium	1,465
22	2017.09.09	FC Ryukyu	2-2	Fujieda MYFC	Okinawa Athletic Park Stadium	1,382
23	2017.09.16	Fujieda MYFC	0-2	Grulla Morioka	Fujieda Soccer Stadium	722
24	2017.09.24	Gainare Tottori	1-6	Fujieda MYFC	Tottori Bank Bird Stadium	1,401
25	2017.10.01	Gamba Osaka U-23	1-6	Fujieda MYFC	Expo '70 Commemorative Stadium	632
26	2017.10.08	Fujieda MYFC	2-2	Azul Claro Numazu	Fujieda Soccer Stadium	2,577
27	2017.10.15	Kataller Toyama	4-2	Fujieda MYFC	Toyama Stadium	2,318
28	2017.10.22	Fujieda MYFC	1-1	SC Sagamihara	Shizuoka Stadium	1,118
29	2017.10.29	Tochigi SC	0-0	Fujieda MYFC	Tochigi Green Stadium	2,793
30	2017.11.05	Fujieda MYFC	4-2	AC Nagano Parceiro	Fujieda Soccer Stadium	1,503
31	2017.11.11	FC Tokyo U-23	2-0	Fujieda MYFC	Yumenoshima Stadium	1,538
32	2017.11.19	Cerezo Osaka U-23	0-0	Fujieda MYFC	Yanmar Stadium Nagai	945
33	2017.11.26	Fujieda MYFC	3-0	Blaublitz Akita	Fujieda Soccer Stadium	1,467
34	2017.12.03	Fujieda MYFC	1-1	YSCC Yokohama	Fujieda Soccer Stadium	1,683
