= 2014 Blaublitz Akita season =

Blaublitz Akita
2014 season
- Chairman: Kosuke Iwase
- Manager: George Yonashiro
- Stadium: Akigin Stadium
- J3 League: 8th
- Emperor's Cup: Second round
- Top goalscorer: Hirochika Miyoshi (12)
- Highest home attendance: 2,488
- Lowest home attendance: 1,057
- Average home league attendance: 1,773 (+0.3%)
Home colours	Away colours

2014 Blaublitz Akita season. The annual club slogan was "挑". The headquarters and practice facilities were transferred from Nikaho to Akita.

== Squad ==
As of 2014.

Note: Flags indicate national team as defined under FIFA eligibility rules; some limited exceptions apply. Players may hold more than one non-FIFA nationality.

No.	Pos.	Nation	Player
1	GK	JPN	Toshimitsu Asai
2	DF	JPN	Shota Imai
3	DF	JPN	Kazuhito Esaki
4	DF	JPN	Toshio Shimakawa
5	DF	JPN	Shinya Hatta
6	DF	JPN	Shintaro Hirai
7	MF	JPN	Kyohei Maeyama
8	MF	JPN	Yoshiki Hiraki
9	FW	BRA	Leonardo
10	MF	JPN	Shingo Kumabayashi
11	FW	JPN	Yusaku Higa
13	MF	JPN	Shohei Shinzato

No.	Pos.	Nation	Player
14	MF	JPN	Kazuhiro Kawata
15	MF	JPN	Takeshi Handa
16	MF	JPN	Hirochika Miyoshi
17	MF	JPN	Hayato Mine
18	MF	JPN	Kenji Suzuki
19	MF	KOR	Lee Keun-Ho (on loan from Omiya Ardija)
20	MF	JPN	Keita Makiuchi
21	GK	JPN	Kei Ishikawa (on loan from Vegalta Sendai)
23	GK	JPN	Takanori Miyake
24	DF	JPN	Naoyuki Yamada
25	FW	JPN	Takashi Fujii

== J3 League ==
Match	Date	Team	Score	Team	Venue	Attendance
1	2014.03.09	YSCC Yokohama	1-1	Blaublitz Akita	NHK Spring Mitsuzawa Football Stadium	1,477
2	2014.03.16	FC Ryukyu	2-0	Blaublitz Akita	Okinawa Athletic Park Stadium	935
3	2014.03.23	Blaublitz Akita	2-2	Fukushima United FC	Akita Yabase Playing Field	2,096
4	2014.03.30	Blaublitz Akita	1-2	J.League U-22 Selection	Akita Yabase Playing Field	1,273
5	2014.04.06	SC Sagamihara	3-0	Blaublitz Akita	Sagamihara Gion Stadium	3,315
6	2014.04.13	Blaublitz Akita	2-1	Grulla Morioka	Akita Yabase Playing Field	1,771
7	2014.04.20	Zweigen Kanazawa	1-0	Blaublitz Akita	Ishikawa Athletics Stadium	1,562
8	2014.04.26	Blaublitz Akita	1-0	Gainare Tottori	Akita Yabase Playing Field	1,611
9	2014.04.29	Blaublitz Akita	1-2	AC Nagano Parceiro	Akita Yabase Playing Field	1,833
10	2014.05.04	FC Machida Zelvia	4-1	Blaublitz Akita	Machida Stadium	3,554
11	2014.05.11	Blaublitz Akita	2-1	Fujieda MYFC	Akita Yabase Playing Field	2,378
12	2014.05.18	Gainare Tottori	1-4	Blaublitz Akita	Chubu Yajin Stadium	2,941
13	2014.05.25	Blaublitz Akita	1-0	SC Sagamihara	Akita Yabase Playing Field	1,917
14	2014.06.01	Grulla Morioka	3-0	Blaublitz Akita	Morioka Minami Park Stadium	1,430
15	2014.06.08	Blaublitz Akita	0-1	Fukushima United FC	Akita Yabase Playing Field	1,443
16	2014.06.15	Blaublitz Akita	3-4	YSCC Yokohama	Akita Yabase Playing Field	1,057
17	2014.06.22	FC Ryukyu	2-0	Blaublitz Akita	Okinawa City Stadium	732
18	2014.07.19	Blaublitz Akita	1-4	FC Machida Zelvia	Akita Yabase Playing Field	2,130
19	2014.07.27	AC Nagano Parceiro	2-0	Blaublitz Akita	Nagano Athletic Stadium	4,329
20	2014.08.03	Blaublitz Akita	4-0	J.League U-22 Selection	Akita Yabase Playing Field	1,333
21	2014.08.10	Blaublitz Akita	2-2	Fujieda MYFC	Akita Yabase Playing Field	1,471
22	2014.08.24	Zweigen Kanazawa	1-0	Blaublitz Akita	Ishikawa Athletics Stadium	6,851
23	2014.08.31	Blaublitz Akita	0-1	FC Ryukyu	Akita Yabase Playing Field	1,281
24	2014.09.07	AC Nagano Parceiro	3-0	Blaublitz Akita	Saku Athletic Stadium	2,360
25	2014.09.14	Blaublitz Akita	2-1	FC Machida Zelvia	Akigin Stadium	2,191
26	2014.09.20	Blaublitz Akita	1-2	Zweigen Kanazawa	Akigin Stadium	1,251
27	2014.10.05	Fukushima United FC	2-0	Blaublitz Akita	Toho Stadium	987
28	2014.10.11	Blaublitz Akita	2-1	YSCC Yokohama	Akigin Stadium	1,919
29	2014.10.19	Gainare Tottori	1-2	Blaublitz Akita	Tottori Bank Bird Stadium	2,441
30	2014.11.02	Blaublitz Akita	1-3	Grulla Morioka	Akigin Stadium	2,488
31	2014.11.09	Fujieda MYFC	1-2	Blaublitz Akita	Fujieda Soccer Stadium	819
32	2014.11.16	SC Sagamihara	2-1	Blaublitz Akita	Sagamihara Gion Stadium	2,632
33	2014.11.23	Blaublitz Akita	1-1	J.League U-22 Selection	Akigin Stadium	2,478

== Standings ==
Pos	Team	Pld	W	D	L	GF	GA	GD	Pts	Promotion or relegation
1	Zweigen Kanazawa (C, P)	33	23	6	4	56	20	+36	75	Promotion to 2015 J2 League (Note: Only clubs that hold J2 licence are eligible for promotion.)
2	Nagano Parceiro	33	20	9	4	58	23	+35	69	Qualification for J2 promotion playoffs
3	Machida Zelvia	33	20	8	5	59	22	+37	68	
4	Gainare Tottori	33	14	11	8	34	25	+9	53	
5	Grulla Morioka	33	12	9	12	43	39	+4	45	
6	SC Sagamihara	33	12	7	14	44	48	−4	43	
7	Fukushima United	33	9	9	15	30	38	−8	36	
8	Blaublitz Akita	33	10	4	19	38	57	−19	34	
9	FC Ryukyu	33	8	10	15	31	50	−19	34	
10	J.League U-22 Selection	33	9	6	18	37	63	−26	33	
11	Fujieda MYFC	33	7	9	17	36	52	−16	30	
12	YSCC Yokohama	33	4	12	17	29	58	−29	24	

Updated to match(es) played on 23 November 2014. Source: J.League
Rules for classification: 1st points; 2nd goal differential; 3rd goals scored; 4th head-to-head results; 5th disciplinary points; 6th draw.
(C) Champions; (P) Promoted

== Emperor's Cup ==
27 June 2014 Akita Prefecture Qualifying Final	Blaublitz Akita	9 – 0	TDK Shinwakai	Akigin Stadium, Akita
13:00	Maeyama 15', 46', 86'; Fujii 25'; Miyoshi 32', 44', 49'; Suzuki 54'; Leonardo 55'	Report		Attendance: 200

6 July 2014 No.4	Blaublitz Akita	7 – 1	Saitama S.C.	Akita Municipal Yabase Athletic Park Football Stadium, Akita
13:00	Maeyama 4'; Shinzato 39' (pen.); Leonardo 51', 82'; Miyoshi 55', 84', 90'	Report	Ono 65'	Attendance: 681; Referee: Motoki Tawara

12 July 2014 No.29	FC Tokyo	8 – 0	Blaublitz Akita	Ajinomoto Stadium, Chofu, Tokyo
18:00	Mita 11'; Kawano 22'; Morishige 26'; Edú 29' (PK), 58'; Ota 48'; Hirayama 62'; Watanabe 84'	Report		Attendance: 5,860; Referee: Nobutsugu Murakami

== Other games ==
16 February 2014	Blaublitz Akita	7–2	FC Naha	Okinawa Prefecture
12:00		Report

18 February 2014	Blaublitz Akita	13–0	Okinawa University/Meio University	Okinawa Prefecture
12:00		Report

20 February 2014	Blaublitz Akita	10–3	Okinawa International University	Okinawa Prefecture
12:00		Report

22 February 2014	Blaublitz Akita	2–0	Kaiho Bank Soccer Club	Okinawa Prefecture
12:00		Report

25 February 2014	Blaublitz Akita	6–2	Kochinda/FC Naha	Okinawa Prefecture
15:30		Report

== Gallery ==
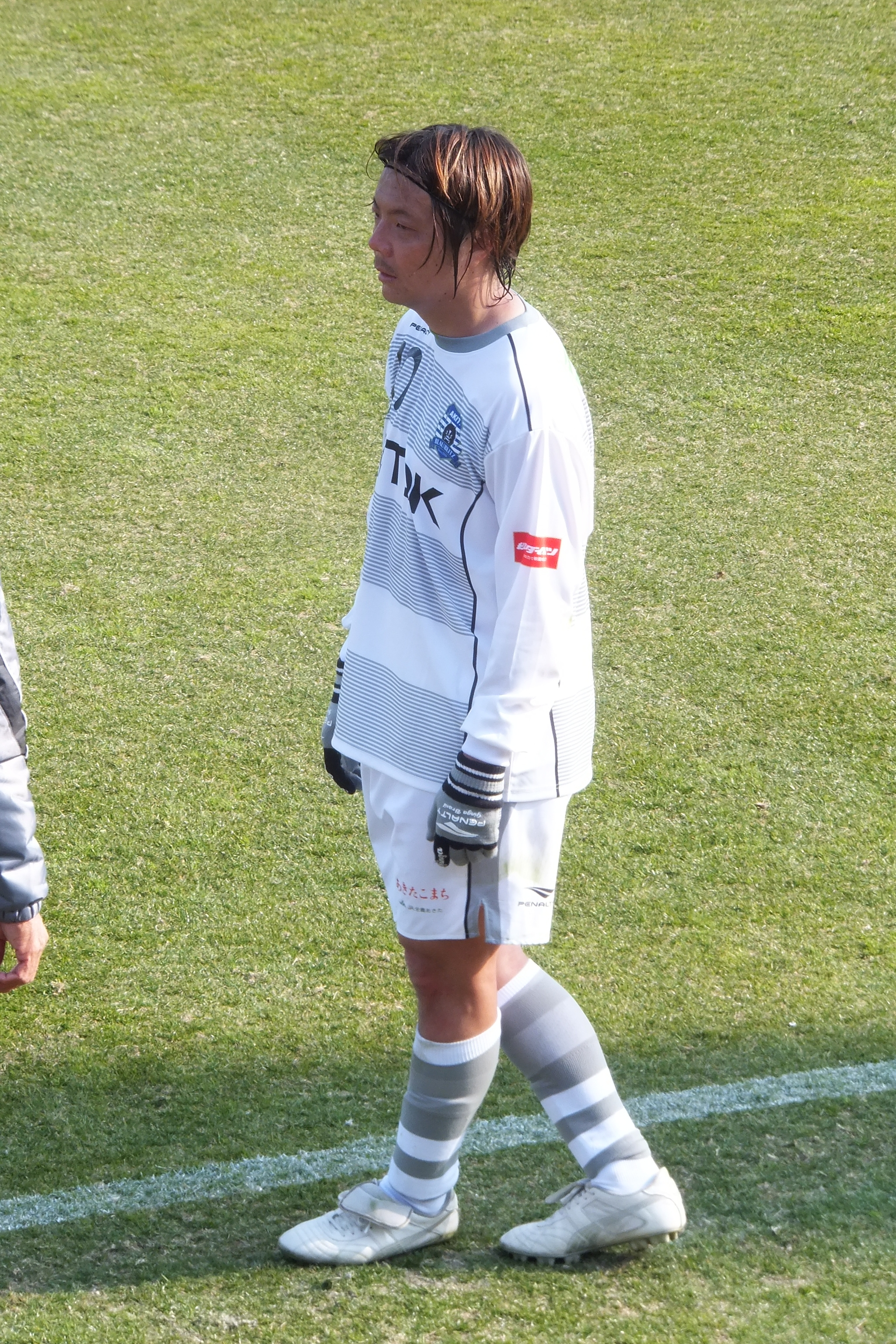
Shingo Kumabayashi in 2014

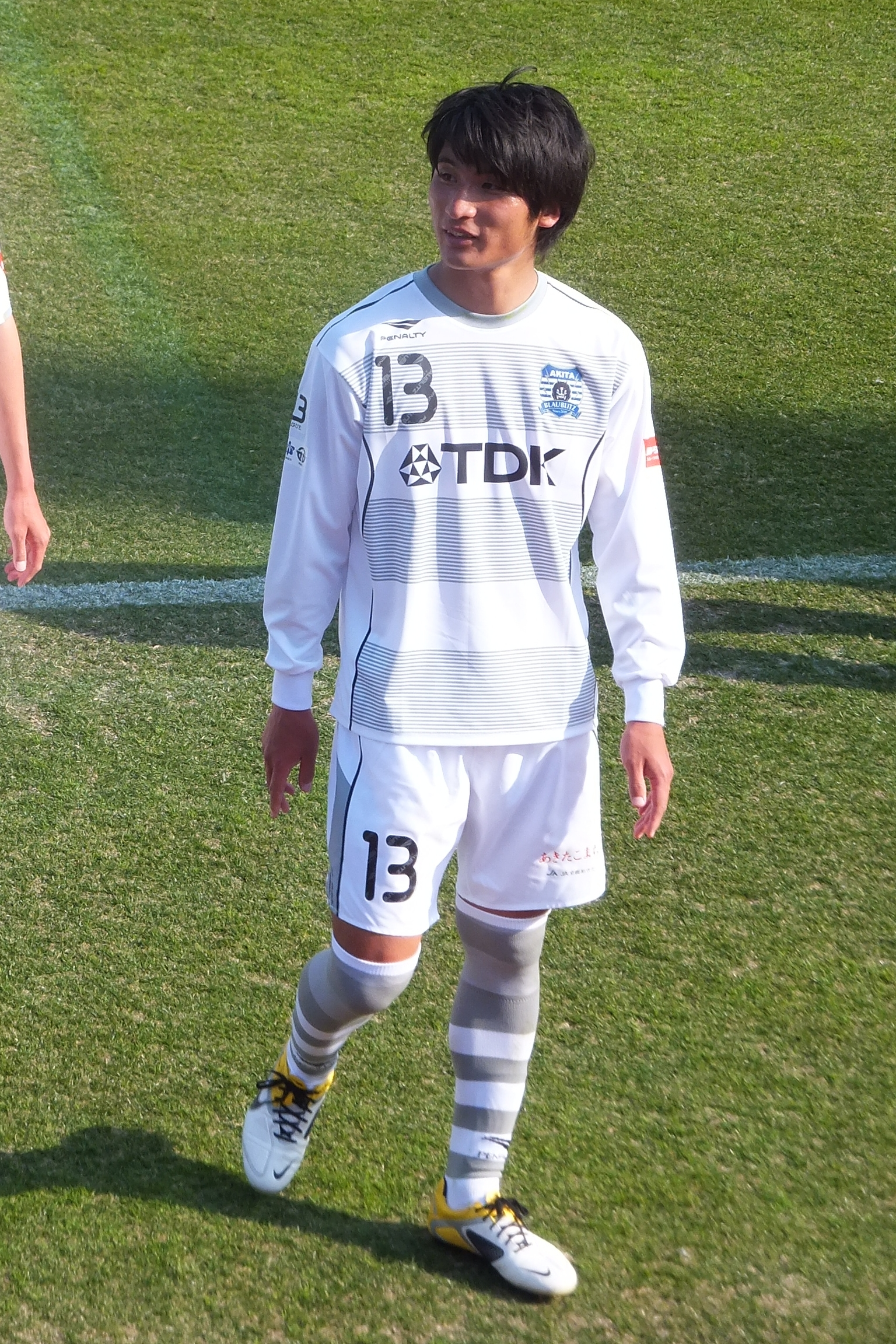
Shohei Shinzato in 2014

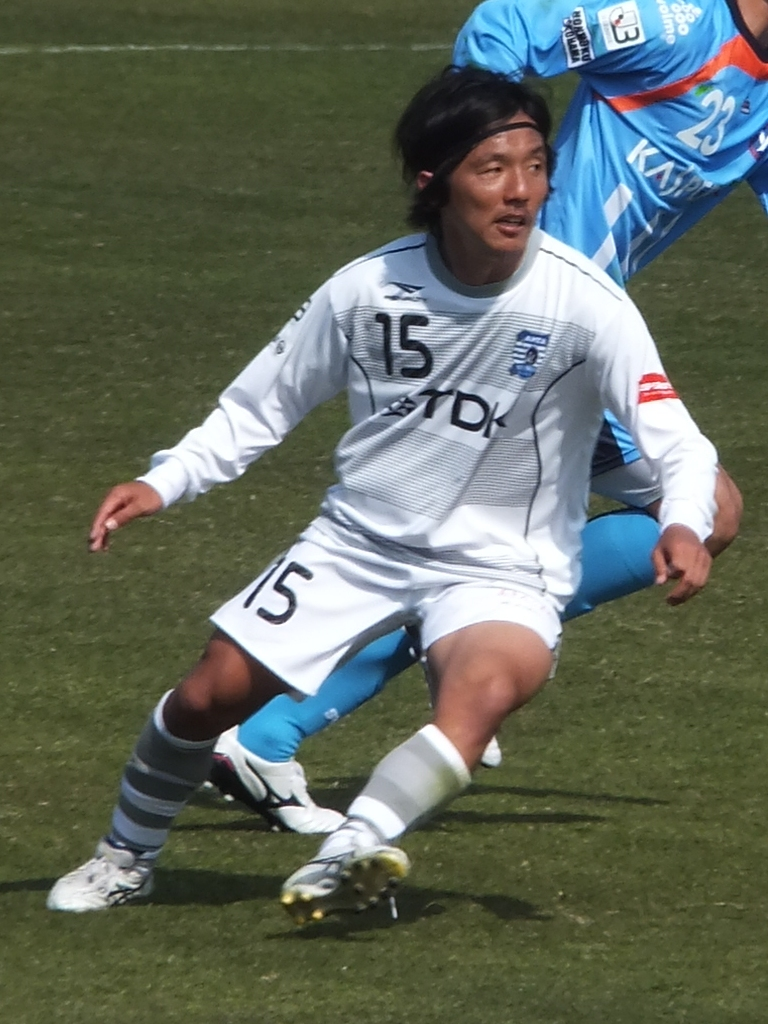
Takeshi Handa in 2014

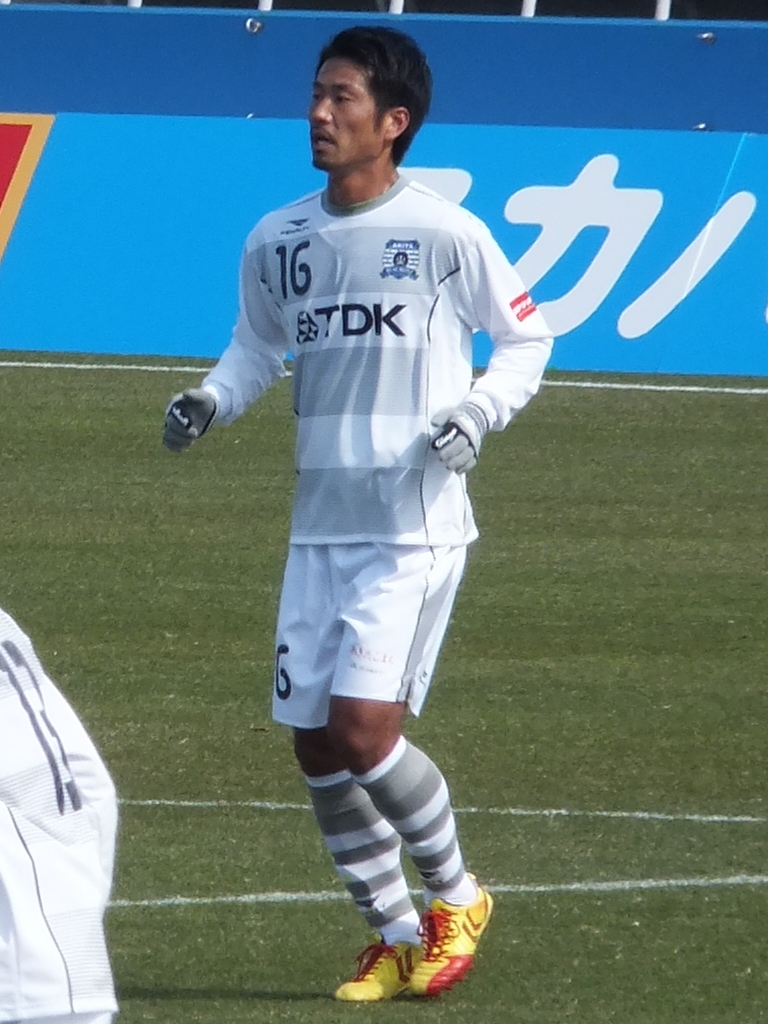
Hirochika Miyoshi in 2014

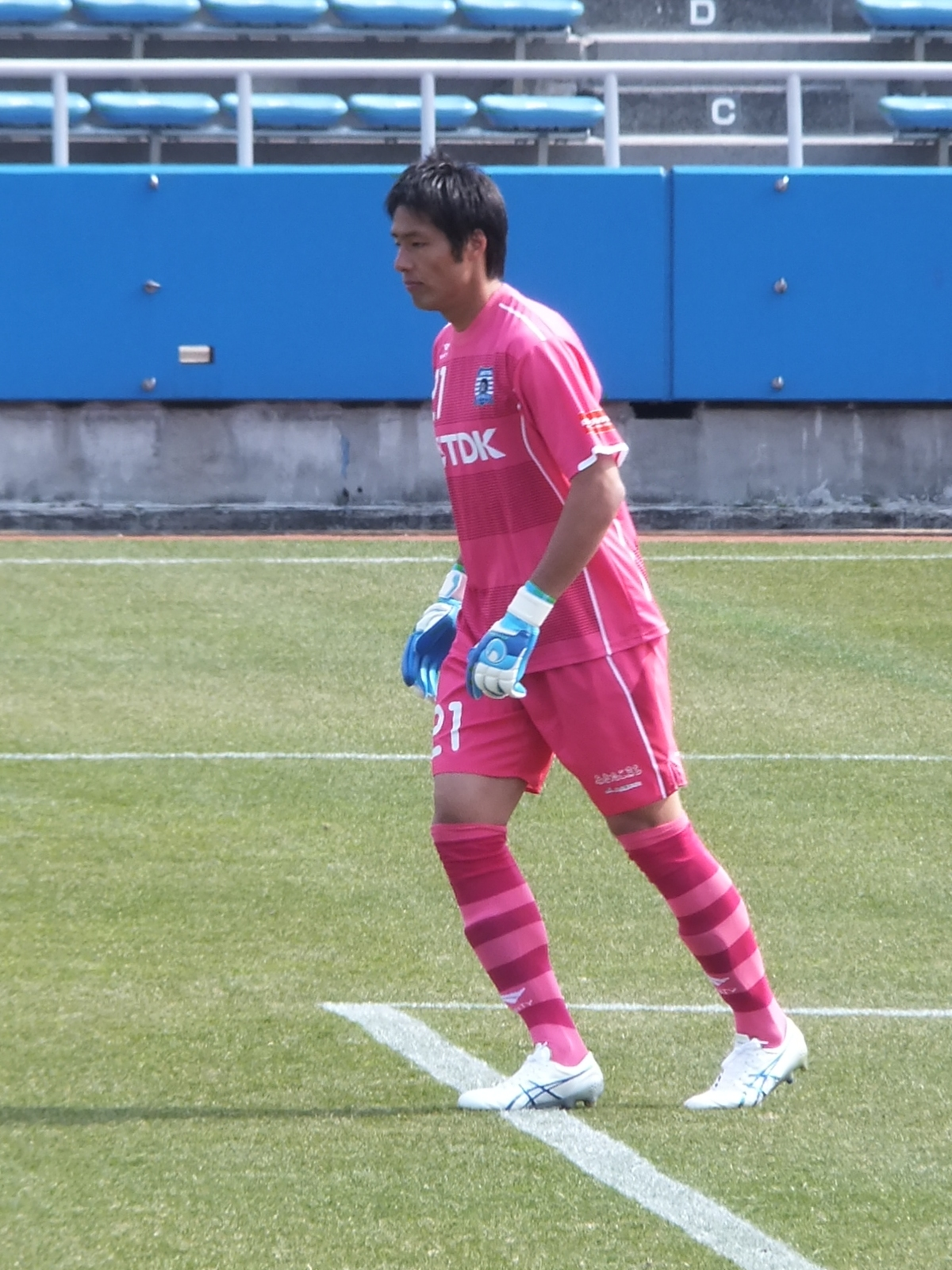
Kei Ishikawa in 2014

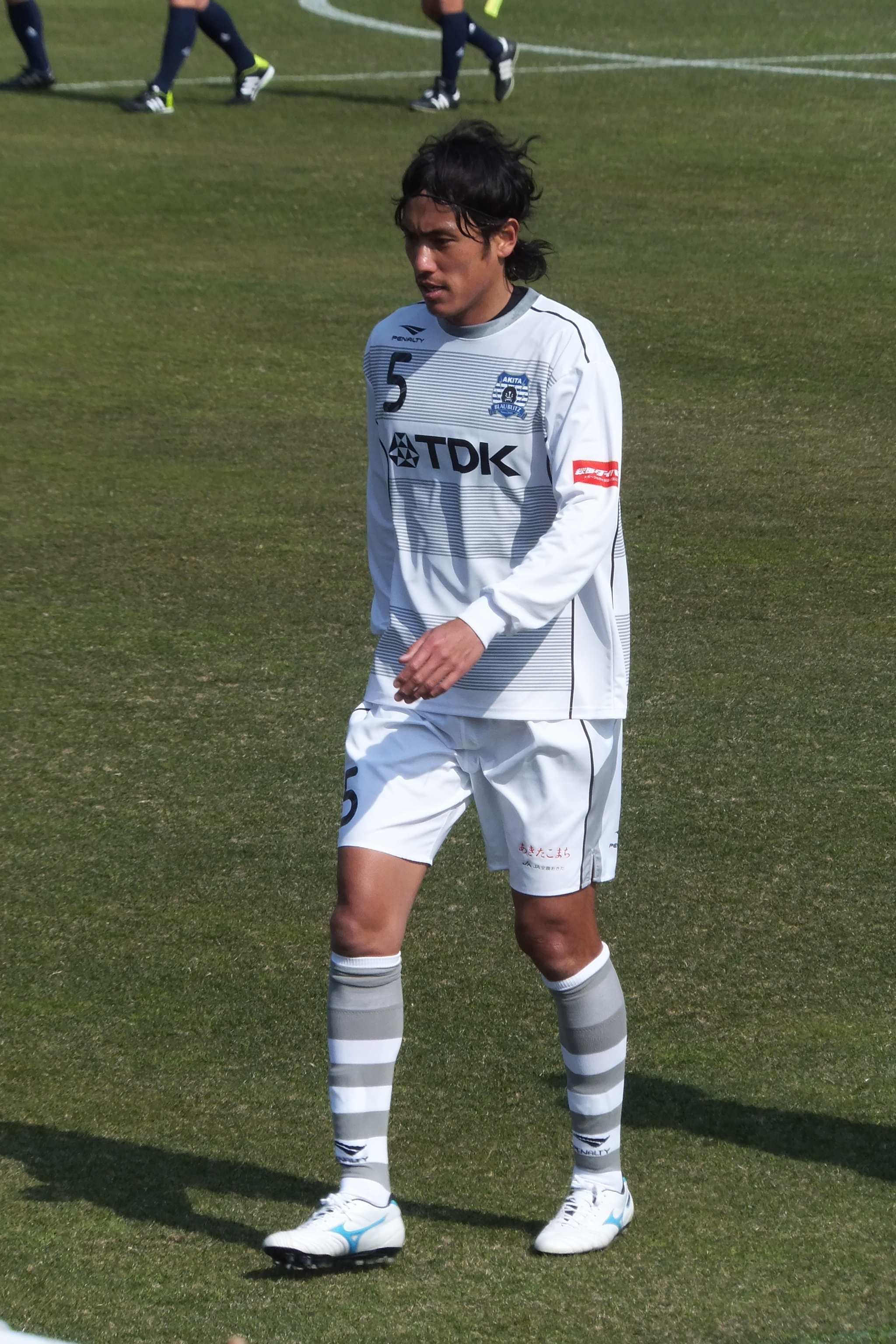
Shinya Hatta in 2014

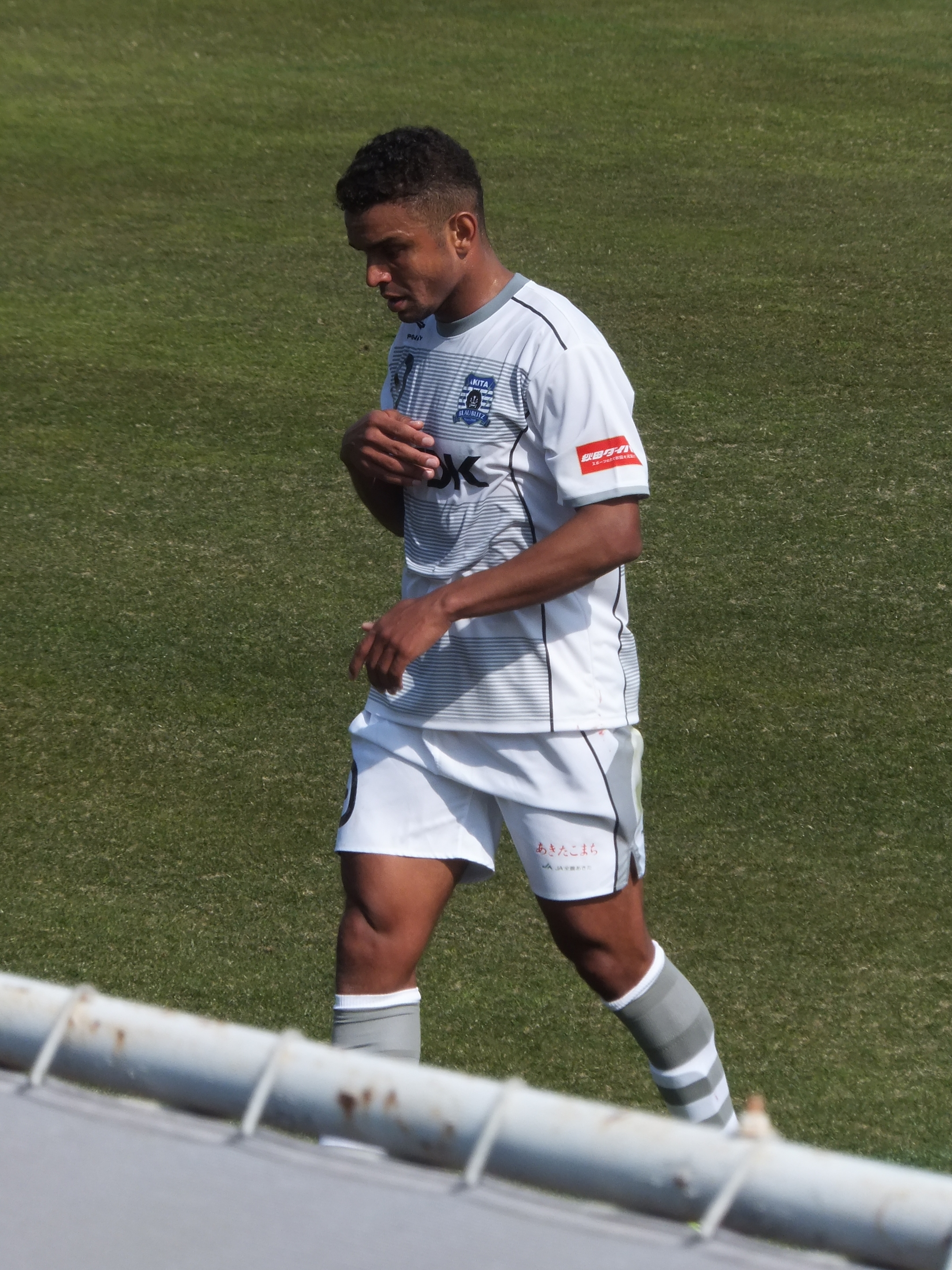
Leonardo in 2014
