= 2018 Gainare Tottori season =

Gainare Tottori
2018 season
- Manager: Ryuzo Morioka; Daisuke Sudo
- Stadium: Tottori Bank Bird Stadium
- J3 League: 3rd
Home colours	Away colours

2018 Gainare Tottori season.

== Competitions ==
=== Emperor's Cup ===
Beat Verspah Oita in the first round.
Lost to Sanfrecce Hiroshima in the 2nd round.

=== League table ===
Pos	Team	Pld	W	D	L	GF	GA	GD	Pts	Promotion
1	FC Ryukyu (C, P)	32	20	6	6	70	40	+30	66	Promotion to 2019 J2 League (Note: Only teams that hold a J2 license are eligible for promotion.)
2	Kagoshima United (P)	32	16	9	7	46	35	+11	57	Promotion to 2019 J2 League
3	Gainare Tottori	32	15	8	9	61	47	+14	53	
4	Azul Claro Numazu	32	14	10	8	40	29	+11	52	
5	Thespakusatsu Gunma	32	15	7	10	37	35	+2	52	

Source: 2018 MEIJI YASUDA J3 LEAGUE League table
Rules for classification: 1) Points; 2) Goal difference; 3) Goals scored; 4th) head-to-head results; 5th) disciplinary points; 6th) draw
(C) Champions; (P) Promoted

== J3 League ==
Match	Date	Team	Score	Team	Venue	Attendance
1	2018.03.11	Kagoshima United FC	0-2	Gainare Tottori	Kagoshima Kamoike Stadium	5,823
2	2018.03.17	Gainare Tottori	2-1	Fukushima United FC	Tottori Bank Bird Stadium	4,817
3	2018.03.21	FC Ryukyu	2-2	Gainare Tottori	Okinawa Athletic Park Stadium	2,331
4	2018.03.25	Gainare Tottori	1-0	Grulla Morioka	Chubu Yajin Stadium	3,855
5	2018.04.01	SC Sagamihara	2-4	Gainare Tottori	Sagamihara Gion Stadium	2,776
6	2018.04.08	Fujieda MYFC	0-0	Gainare Tottori	Fujieda Soccer Stadium	873
7	2018.04.15	Gainare Tottori	1-4	YSCC Yokohama	Tottori Bank Bird Stadium	1,703
8	2018.04.28	Azul Claro Numazu	1-0	Gainare Tottori	Ashitaka Park Stadium	2,567
9	2018.05.03	Gainare Tottori	1-4	Cerezo Osaka U-23	Tottori Bank Bird Stadium	2,603
10	2018.05.06	FC Tokyo U-23	0-0	Gainare Tottori	Ajinomoto Field Nishigaoka	2,364
11	2018.05.19	Gainare Tottori	2-3	Kataller Toyama	Tottori Bank Bird Stadium	2,247
12	2018.06.02	Gainare Tottori	2-0	Blaublitz Akita	Tottori Bank Bird Stadium	1,302
13	2018.06.10	AC Nagano Parceiro	0-1	Gainare Tottori	Nagano U Stadium	3,457
14	2018.06.16	Gainare Tottori	1-0	Gamba Osaka U-23	Tottori Bank Bird Stadium	2,456
16	2018.06.30	Giravanz Kitakyushu	3-0	Gainare Tottori	Mikuni World Stadium Kitakyushu	3,360
18	2018.07.16	Kataller Toyama	1-0	Gainare Tottori	Toyama Stadium	2,133
19	2018.07.21	Cerezo Osaka U-23	0-4	Gainare Tottori	Yanmar Stadium Nagai	1,047
17	2018.07.28	Gainare Tottori	1-2	Thespakusatsu Gunma	Tottori Bank Bird Stadium	1,511
20	2018.08.25	Gainare Tottori	2-2	Azul Claro Numazu	Tottori Bank Bird Stadium	3,644
21	2018.09.02	Gainare Tottori	7-0	SC Sagamihara	Chubu Yajin Stadium	3,073
22	2018.09.09	Grulla Morioka	3-3	Gainare Tottori	Iwagin Stadium	515
23	2018.09.15	Blaublitz Akita	2-2	Gainare Tottori	Akigin Stadium	2,777
24	2018.09.22	Gainare Tottori	4-2	FC Tokyo U-23	Tottori Bank Bird Stadium	2,233
26	2018.10.07	Gamba Osaka U-23	2-0	Gainare Tottori	Panasonic Stadium Suita	1,778
27	2018.10.14	Gainare Tottori	5-1	Kagoshima United FC	Tottori Bank Bird Stadium	2,401
28	2018.10.20	Gainare Tottori	1-3	FC Ryukyu	Tottori Bank Bird Stadium	3,034
29	2018.10.28	Fukushima United FC	3-4	Gainare Tottori	Toho Stadium	1,408
30	2018.11.04	Gainare Tottori	1-1	Giravanz Kitakyushu	Chubu Yajin Stadium	3,125
31	2018.11.11	Thespakusatsu Gunma	3-3	Gainare Tottori	Shoda Shoyu Stadium Gunma	3,030
32	2018.11.18	Gainare Tottori	1-0	AC Nagano Parceiro	Tottori Bank Bird Stadium	1,906
33	2018.11.24	YSCC Yokohama	1-2	Gainare Tottori	NHK Spring Mitsuzawa Football Stadium	1,417
34	2018.12.02	Gainare Tottori	2-1	Fujieda MYFC	Tottori Bank Bird Stadium	2,609
