= 2015 Gainare Tottori season =

Gainare Tottori
2015 season
- Manager: Masanobu Matsunami
- Stadium: Tottori Bank Bird Stadium
- J3 League: 6th

2015 Gainare Tottori season.

== Competitions ==
=== Emperor's Cup ===
Beat Fagiano Okayama in the first round.
Lost to Roasso Kumamoto in the 2nd round.

== J3 League ==
=== League table ===
Pos	Team	Pld	W	D	L	GF	GA	GD	Pts
4	SC Sagamihara	36	17	7	12	59	51	+8	58
5	Kataller Toyama	36	14	10	12	37	36	+1	52
6	Gainare Tottori	36	14	8	14	47	41	+6	50
7	Fukushima United	36	13	10	13	42	48	−6	49
8	Blaublitz Akita	36	12	9	15	37	40	−3	45

Updated to match(es) played on 23 November 2015. Source: JLeague.jp
Rules for classification: 1) Points; 2) Goal difference; 3) Goals scored; 4th) head-to-head results; 5th) disciplinary points; 6th) draw

=== Match details ===
J3 League match details
Match	Date	Team	Score	Team	Venue	Attendance
1	2015.03.15	Renofa Yamaguchi FC	2-1	Gainare Tottori	Ishin Memorial Park Stadium	7,194
2	2015.03.22	Gainare Tottori	2-1	Kataller Toyama	Tottori Bank Bird Stadium	2,684
3	2015.03.29	SC Sagamihara	0-2	Gainare Tottori	Sagamihara Gion Stadium	2,021
4	2015.04.05	Gainare Tottori	2-0	J.League U-22 Selection	Tottori Bank Bird Stadium	1,191
5	2015.04.12	FC Machida Zelvia	2-0	Gainare Tottori	Machida Stadium	2,843
6	2015.04.19	Gainare Tottori	1-0	FC Ryukyu	Tottori Bank Bird Stadium	1,248
7	2015.04.26	Gainare Tottori	1-2	Fukushima United FC	Tottori Bank Bird Stadium	1,511
9	2015.05.03	Gainare Tottori	2-0	Fujieda MYFC	Tottori Bank Bird Stadium	1,552
10	2015.05.06	Grulla Morioka	0-1	Gainare Tottori	Morioka Minami Park Stadium	1,272
11	2015.05.10	Blaublitz Akita	1-2	Gainare Tottori	Akigin Stadium	3,211
12	2015.05.17	Gainare Tottori	1-1	YSCC Yokohama	Tottori Bank Bird Stadium	1,651
13	2015.05.24	Gainare Tottori	0-1	AC Nagano Parceiro	Tottori Bank Bird Stadium	1,530
14	2015.05.31	SC Sagamihara	2-1	Gainare Tottori	Sagamihara Gion Stadium	2,582
15	2015.06.07	Gainare Tottori	1-1	J.League U-22 Selection	Tottori Bank Bird Stadium	1,096
16	2015.06.14	AC Nagano Parceiro	2-0	Gainare Tottori	Minami Nagano Sports Park Stadium	4,157
18	2015.06.28	FC Ryukyu	2-1	Gainare Tottori	Okinawa Athletic Park Stadium	8,993
19	2015.07.05	Gainare Tottori	0-0	FC Machida Zelvia	Chubu Yajin Stadium	2,446
20	2015.07.12	YSCC Yokohama	1-0	Gainare Tottori	NHK Spring Mitsuzawa Football Stadium	635
21	2015.07.19	Gainare Tottori	2-1	Grulla Morioka	Tottori Bank Bird Stadium	3,295
22	2015.07.26	Blaublitz Akita	1-2	Gainare Tottori	Akigin Stadium	1,610
23	2015.07.29	Gainare Tottori	2-1	Fujieda MYFC	Tottori Bank Bird Stadium	1,470
24	2015.08.02	Fukushima United FC	1-0	Gainare Tottori	Toho Stadium	3,207
25	2015.08.09	Gainare Tottori	1-1	Renofa Yamaguchi FC	Tottori Bank Bird Stadium	2,381
26	2015.08.16	Gainare Tottori	1-2	Kataller Toyama	Chubu Yajin Stadium	1,715
27	2015.09.06	Fujieda MYFC	4-2	Gainare Tottori	Fujieda Soccer Stadium	851
28	2015.09.13	Gainare Tottori	3-0	FC Ryukyu	Tottori Bank Bird Stadium	2,305
30	2015.09.23	Gainare Tottori	6-2	SC Sagamihara	Chubu Yajin Stadium	1,620
31	2015.09.27	Gainare Tottori	1-1	Fukushima United FC	Tottori Bank Bird Stadium	2,069
32	2015.10.04	AC Nagano Parceiro	1-0	Gainare Tottori	Minami Nagano Sports Park Stadium	3,616
33	2015.10.11	Gainare Tottori	0-1	J.League U-22 Selection	Tottori Bank Bird Stadium	1,349
34	2015.10.18	Gainare Tottori	0-1	Blaublitz Akita	Chubu Yajin Stadium	2,253
35	2015.10.25	Kataller Toyama	1-1	Gainare Tottori	Toyama Stadium	2,995
36	2015.10.31	Grulla Morioka	1-2	Gainare Tottori	Morioka Minami Park Stadium	890
37	2015.11.08	Gainare Tottori	1-1	FC Machida Zelvia	Tottori Bank Bird Stadium	1,258
38	2015.11.13	YSCC Yokohama	1-3	Gainare Tottori	Shonan BMW Stadium Hiratsuka	461
39	2015.11.23	Gainare Tottori	2-2	Renofa Yamaguchi FC	Tottori Bank Bird Stadium	4,013
