= 2014 Gainare Tottori season =

Gainare Tottori
2014 season
- Manager: Masanobu Matsunami
- Stadium: Tottori Bank Bird Stadium
- J3 League: 4th

2014 Gainare Tottori season.

== Competitions ==
=== Emperor's Cup ===
Beat Tadotsu FC in the first round.
Lost to Kyoto Sanga in the 2nd round.

=== League table ===
Pos	Team	Pld	W	D	L	GF	GA	GD	Pts	Promotion or relegation
2	Nagano Parceiro	33	20	9	4	58	23	+35	69	Qualification for J2 promotion playoffs (Note: Only clubs that hold J2 licence are eligible for promotion.)
3	Machida Zelvia	33	20	8	5	59	22	+37	68	
4	Gainare Tottori	33	14	11	8	34	25	+9	53	
5	Grulla Morioka	33	12	9	12	43	39	+4	45	
6	SC Sagamihara	33	12	7	14	44	48	−4	43	

Source: J.League
Rules for classification: 1) Points; 2) Goal differential; 3) Goals scored; 4) Head-to-head results; 5) Disciplinary points; 6) Draw.

== J3 League ==
Match	Date	Team	Score	Team	Venue	Attendance
1	2014.03.09	Gainare Tottori	0-0	Grulla Morioka	Tottori Bank Bird Stadium	3,962
2	2014.03.16	Zweigen Kanazawa	1-1	Gainare Tottori	Ishikawa Athletics Stadium	2,573
3	2014.03.23	Gainare Tottori	1-0	SC Sagamihara	Tottori Bank Bird Stadium	2,535
4	2014.03.30	Fukushima United FC	0-1	Gainare Tottori	Toho Stadium	504
5	2014.04.06	Gainare Tottori	1-1	AC Nagano Parceiro	Tottori Bank Bird Stadium	1,832
6	2014.04.13	Fujieda MYFC	0-2	Gainare Tottori	Fujieda Soccer Stadium	1,113
7	2014.04.20	Gainare Tottori	1-0	J.League U-22 Selection	Tottori Bank Bird Stadium	2,545
8	2014.04.26	Blaublitz Akita	1-0	Gainare Tottori	Akita Yabase Playing Field	1,611
9	2014.04.29	Gainare Tottori	0-1	FC Machida Zelvia	Chubu Yajin Stadium	3,486
10	2014.05.04	YSCC Yokohama	0-2	Gainare Tottori	NHK Spring Mitsuzawa Football Stadium	1,247
11	2014.05.11	Gainare Tottori	0-0	FC Ryukyu	Tottori Bank Bird Stadium	2,100
12	2014.05.18	Gainare Tottori	1-4	Blaublitz Akita	Chubu Yajin Stadium	2,941
13	2014.05.25	Gainare Tottori	1-0	J.League U-22 Selection	Tottori Bank Bird Stadium	2,338
14	2014.06.01	Fukushima United FC	2-0	Gainare Tottori	Toho Stadium	1,152
15	2014.06.08	Gainare Tottori	0-0	YSCC Yokohama	Tottori Bank Bird Stadium	2,396
16	2014.06.15	SC Sagamihara	0-1	Gainare Tottori	Sagamihara Gion Stadium	2,171
17	2014.06.22	Gainare Tottori	0-0	Fujieda MYFC	Chubu Yajin Stadium	2,018
18	2014.07.20	AC Nagano Parceiro	1-1	Gainare Tottori	Saku Athletic Stadium	2,268
19	2014.07.27	FC Ryukyu	0-3	Gainare Tottori	Okinawa City Stadium	851
20	2014.08.03	Gainare Tottori	4-2	Zweigen Kanazawa	Tottori Bank Bird Stadium	5,892
21	2014.08.10	FC Machida Zelvia	1-1	Gainare Tottori	Machida Stadium	2,231
22	2014.08.24	Gainare Tottori	1-0	Grulla Morioka	Chubu Yajin Stadium	5,063
23	2014.08.31	Gainare Tottori	2-0	Fukushima United FC	Tottori Bank Bird Stadium	4,147
24	2014.09.07	SC Sagamihara	1-0	Gainare Tottori	Sagamihara Gion Stadium	2,051
25	2014.09.14	FC Ryukyu	0-0	Gainare Tottori	Okinawa City Stadium	1,053
26	2014.09.21	Gainare Tottori	2-1	Fujieda MYFC	Tottori Bank Bird Stadium	3,030
27	2014.10.05	FC Machida Zelvia	1-2	Gainare Tottori	Machida Stadium	2,012
28	2014.10.12	Gainare Tottori	1-1	AC Nagano Parceiro	Chubu Yajin Stadium	3,470
29	2014.10.19	Gainare Tottori	1-2	Blaublitz Akita	Tottori Bank Bird Stadium	2,441
30	2014.11.02	Gainare Tottori	0-1	Zweigen Kanazawa	Tottori Bank Bird Stadium	2,306
31	2014.11.09	YSCC Yokohama	1-2	Gainare Tottori	Yokohama Mitsuzawa Athletic Stadium	842
32	2014.11.16	Gainare Tottori	1-2	J.League U-22 Selection	Tottori Bank Bird Stadium	2,740
33	2014.11.23	Grulla Morioka	1-1	Gainare Tottori	Morioka Minami Park Stadium	3,035
