= 2015 SC Sagamihara season =

SC Sagamihara
2015 season
- Manager: Keiju Karashima; Yoshika Matsubara
- Stadium: Sagamihara Gion Stadium
- J3 League: 4th

2015 SC Sagamihara season.

== J3 League ==
=== League table ===
Pos	Team	Pld	W	D	L	GF	GA	GD	Pts	Promotion or relegation
1	Renofa Yamaguchi (C, P)	36	25	3	8	96	36	+60	78	Promotion to 2016 J2 League
2	Machida Zelvia (P)	36	23	9	4	52	18	+34	78	Qualification to J2 League promotion playoffs (Note: Only teams that hold a J2 license are eligible for promotion.)
3	Nagano Parceiro	36	21	7	8	46	28	+18	70	
4	SC Sagamihara	36	17	7	12	59	51	+8	58	
5	Kataller Toyama	36	14	10	12	37	36	+1	52	
6	Gainare Tottori	36	14	8	14	47	41	+6	50	
7	Fukushima United	36	13	10	13	42	48	−6	49	

Updated to match(es) played on 23 November 2015. Source: JLeague.jp
Rules for classification: 1) Points; 2) Goal difference; 3) Goals scored; 4th) head-to-head results; 5th) disciplinary points; 6th) draw
(C) Champions; (P) Promoted

=== Match details ===
J3 League match details
Match	Date	Team	Score	Team	Venue	Attendance
1	2015.03.15	SC Sagamihara	3-0	J.League U-22 Selection	Sagamihara Gion Stadium	3,061
2	2015.03.22	AC Nagano Parceiro	1-2	SC Sagamihara	Minami Nagano Sports Park Stadium	8,681
3	2015.03.29	SC Sagamihara	0-2	Gainare Tottori	Sagamihara Gion Stadium	2,021
4	2015.04.05	SC Sagamihara	1-1	Grulla Morioka	Sagamihara Gion Stadium	1,660
5	2015.04.12	Fujieda MYFC	0-2	SC Sagamihara	Fujieda Soccer Stadium	1,015
6	2015.04.19	SC Sagamihara	2-1	FC Machida Zelvia	Sagamihara Gion Stadium	4,862
7	2015.04.26	Blaublitz Akita	3-0	SC Sagamihara	Akigin Stadium	1,815
8	2015.04.29	Kataller Toyama	0-1	SC Sagamihara	Toyama Stadium	3,817
9	2015.05.03	SC Sagamihara	2-0	Fukushima United FC	Sagamihara Gion Stadium	2,531
10	2015.05.06	Renofa Yamaguchi FC	2-0	SC Sagamihara	Ishin Memorial Park Stadium	5,212
11	2015.05.10	SC Sagamihara	0-1	FC Ryukyu	Sagamihara Gion Stadium	3,205
13	2015.05.24	YSCC Yokohama	0-4	SC Sagamihara	NHK Spring Mitsuzawa Football Stadium	1,047
14	2015.05.31	SC Sagamihara	2-1	Gainare Tottori	Sagamihara Gion Stadium	2,582
15	2015.06.07	SC Sagamihara	1-1	FC Ryukyu	Sagamihara Gion Stadium	2,049
16	2015.06.14	Grulla Morioka	2-3	SC Sagamihara	Morioka Minami Park Stadium	3,025
17	2015.06.21	SC Sagamihara	3-1	Blaublitz Akita	Sagamihara Gion Stadium	1,723
18	2015.06.28	SC Sagamihara	5-0	Fujieda MYFC	Sagamihara Gion Stadium	4,105
19	2015.07.05	YSCC Yokohama	0-1	SC Sagamihara	NHK Spring Mitsuzawa Football Stadium	709
20	2015.07.12	SC Sagamihara	1-2	J.League U-22 Selection	Sagamihara Gion Stadium	2,821
21	2015.07.19	Kataller Toyama	0-0	SC Sagamihara	Uozu Momoyama Sports Park Stadium	2,163
22	2015.07.26	SC Sagamihara	0-3	Renofa Yamaguchi FC	Sagamihara Gion Stadium	3,517
23	2015.07.29	AC Nagano Parceiro	0-0	SC Sagamihara	Minami Nagano Sports Park Stadium	3,159
25	2015.08.09	SC Sagamihara	0-1	FC Machida Zelvia	Sagamihara Gion Stadium	5,549
26	2015.08.16	Fukushima United FC	1-1	SC Sagamihara	Toho Stadium	1,308
27	2015.09.06	SC Sagamihara	2-2	Grulla Morioka	Sagamihara Gion Stadium	1,882
28	2015.09.13	Fujieda MYFC	1-3	SC Sagamihara	Fujieda Soccer Stadium	1,176
29	2015.09.20	SC Sagamihara	3-2	J.League U-22 Selection	Sagamihara Gion Stadium	2,062
30	2015.09.23	Gainare Tottori	6-2	SC Sagamihara	Chubu Yajin Stadium	1,620
31	2015.09.27	SC Sagamihara	5-1	Kataller Toyama	Sagamihara Gion Stadium	2,532
32	2015.10.04	Renofa Yamaguchi FC	5-0	SC Sagamihara	Shimonoseki Stadium	3,315
33	2015.10.11	SC Sagamihara	0-2	Fukushima United FC	Sagamihara Gion Stadium	3,477
34	2015.10.18	FC Machida Zelvia	1-0	SC Sagamihara	Machida Stadium	7,782
35	2015.10.25	SC Sagamihara	0-2	YSCC Yokohama	Sagamihara Gion Stadium	9,040
37	2015.11.08	FC Ryukyu	4-6	SC Sagamihara	Okinawa Athletic Park Stadium	1,055
38	2015.11.15	SC Sagamihara	2-0	AC Nagano Parceiro	Sagamihara Gion Stadium	3,854
39	2015.11.23	Blaublitz Akita	2-2	SC Sagamihara	Akigin Stadium	2,831
