= Naohiro Takahara =

Japanese footballer & manager (born 1979)

Naohiro Takahara 高原 直泰
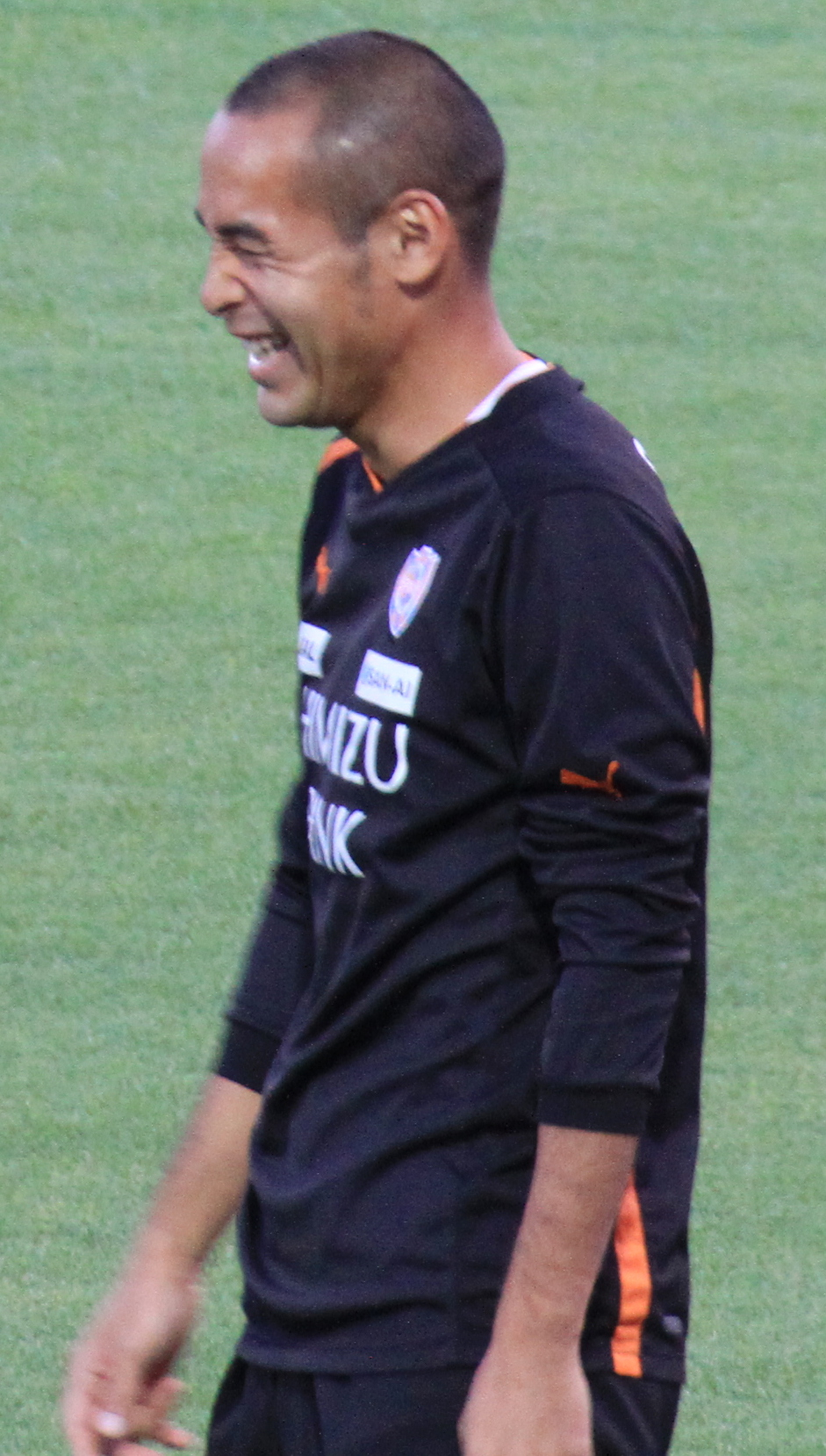
- Takahara with Shimizu S-Pulse in 2012

Personal information
- Full name: Naohiro Takahara
- Date of birth: 4 June 1979 (age 47)
- Place of birth: Mishima, Shizuoka, Japan
- Height: 1.81 m (5 ft 11 in)
- Position: Forward

Youth career
- 1995–1997: Shimizu Higashi High School

Senior career*
Years	Team	Apps	(Gls)
1998–2002	Júbilo Iwata	105	(58)
2001	→ Boca Juniors (loan)	6	(1)
2002–2006	Hamburger SV	97	(13)
2006–2008	Eintracht Frankfurt	38	(12)
2008–2010	Urawa Reds	63	(10)
2010	→ Suwon Samsung Bluewings (loan)	12	(4)
2011–2012	Shimizu S-Pulse	46	(9)
2013–2014	Tokyo Verdy	41	(11)
2014–2015	SC Sagamihara	54	(11)
2016–2023	Okinawa SV	62	(30)
Total		464	(129)

International career
1995	Japan U17	3	(1)
1998–1999	Japan U20	16	(16)
1998–2000	Japan U23	11	(4)
2000–2008	Japan	57	(23)

Managerial career
- 2016–2019: Okinawa SV
- 2021–2023: Okinawa SV
Medal record
Júbilo Iwata
Winner	J1 League	1999
Winner	J1 League	2002
Runner-up	J1 League	1998
Runner-up	J1 League	2001
Winner	J.League Cup	1998
Runner-up	J.League Cup	2001
Shimizu S-Pulse
Runner-up	J.League Cup	2012
Representing Japan
AFC Asian Cup
Gold medal – first place	2000 Lebanon
FIFA U-20 World Cup
Silver medal – second place	1999 Nigeria
AFC U-19 Championship
Silver medal – second place	1998 Thailand
AFC U-16 Championship
Gold medal – first place	1994 Qatar
- * Club domestic league appearances and goals

Naohiro Takahara (高原 直泰, Takahara Naohiro; born 4 June 1979) is a Japanese football manager and former player who played as a forward. He is currently the president of Japan Football League club Okinawa SV.

== Club career ==
Takahara was born in Mishima on 4 June 1979. After graduating from high school, he joined Júbilo Iwata in 1998. In 1998, the club won J.League Cup and he was selected New Hero awards. In 1999, the club won J1 League and Asian Club Championship. The club also reached second place at the 1999–2000 and 2000–01 Asian Club Championships. In August 2001, he moved to Boca Juniors on loan. He became the first Japanese player to play in the Argentine Primera División.

In 2002, he returned to Júbilo Iwata. The club went on to win the 2002 J.League Division 1, while Takahara became the top scorer and was elected Most Valuable Player of the year.

After the 2002 season, Takahara moved to Hamburger SV. He made his Bundesliga debut on in January 2003 in a 2–2 draw against Hannover 96, thereby becoming the third Japanese footballer to play in Bundesliga after Yasuhiko Okudera and Kazuo Ozaki. On 3 December 2006, he scored his first hat-trick in the Bundesliga in a match against Alemannia Aachen.

In January 2008 he moved to Urawa Reds for a transfer fee of around ¥180 million (around $1.7 million). Due to a disagreement with the style of coach Volker Finke, who had taken over as coach of Urawa in 2009, Takahara was leased to Suwon Samsung Bluewings of the South Korean K League 1 in July of the following year. On 31 July 2010, he made his debut as a substitute for the 39th minute of the match against Gwangju FC. On 29 August, he scored a goal in the 39th minute of the second half of the game against FC Seoul. He helped victorious game 4-2 and won the MVP in this game.

In 2011, he returned to Japan and signed with Shimizu S-Pulse. After that, he played for J2 League club Tokyo Verdy (2013–14) and J3 League club SC Sagamihara (2014–15).

In December 2015, along with Japanese judoka Tadahiro Nomura, Takahara founded Okinawa SV. He served not only as club's president, but also played and captained the club. On 27 November 2022, he brought his club a first-time promotion for the Japan Football League, after a 4–0 over FC Kariya led them to finish as runners-up at the 2022 Regional Champions League. He featured in the match as a late substitution. On 31 August 2023, Takahara announced his retirement at the end of this season.

== International career ==
In August 1995, Takahara was selected by the Japan U17 national team for 1995 U-17 World Championship. He played all three matches and scored one goal. In April 1999, he was also selected Japan U-20 national team for 1999 World Youth Championship. He played all seven matches and scored three goals. Japan achieved second place. In February 2000, he was selected by the Japan national team for 2000 Asian Cup qualification. At this qualification, on 13 February, he debuted against Singapore. He played all three matches and three goals and Japan won the qualify for 2000 Asian Cup.

In September, he was selected Japan U23 national team for 2000 Summer Olympics. He played all four matches and scored three goals in first match and quarterfinal. In October, he played at 2000 Asian Cup. He played five matches and scored five goals. Japan won the champions. However he missed the 2002 FIFA World Cup, co-hosted by his home country and South Korea, because of lung disease (venous thrombosis).

After 2002 World Cup, Takahara played at 2003 Confederations Cup. Although his convocation for Japan decreased due to the schedule, he played as regular player when he was elected Japan. In 2006, he was elected Japan for 2006 World Cup and he played all three matches. After 2006 World Cup, he played at 2007 Asian Cup. He played six matches and scored four goals, and became a top scorer. He played 57 games and scored 23 goals for Japan until 2008.

=== 2007 Asian Cup ===
Takahara finished top scorer after an impressive performance at the 2007 Asian Cup. He scored against Qatar in the first match, who Japan tied 1–1. Japan won the next match, against United Arab Emirates and Takahara impressed coach Ivica Osim with two goals. In the quarterfinal match against rivals Australia, Takahara scored the tying goal and sent the game to penalty kicks. Although Takahara missed his spot-kick, saves from goalkeeper Yoshikatsu Kawaguchi sent Japan through into the semifinals, where they lost to Saudi Arabia 3–2.

== Career statistics ==
=== Club ===
As of 19 March 2023.

Appearances and goals by club, season and competition
Club	season	League			National cup		League cup		Continental		Total	
Club	season	Division	Apps	Goals	Apps	Goals	Apps	Goals	Apps	Goals	Apps	Goals
Júbilo Iwata	1998	J.League / J. League Division 1	20	5	2	0	6	4	–		28	9
Júbilo Iwata	1999	J.League / J. League Division 1	21	9	3	1	1	0	–		25	10
Júbilo Iwata	2000	J.League / J. League Division 1	24	10	0	0	2	0	–		26	10
Júbilo Iwata	2001	J.League / J. League Division 1	13	8	0	0	2	2	–		15	10
Júbilo Iwata	2002	J.League / J. League Division 1	27	26	3	0	0	0	–		30	26
Júbilo Iwata	Total		105	58	8	1	11	6	–		124	65
Boca Juniors	2001–02	Argentine Primera División	6	1	–		–		1	0	7	1
Hamburger SV	2002–03	Bundesliga	16	3	–		–		–		16	3
Hamburger SV	2003–04	Bundesliga	29	2	3	1	3	1	2	0	37	4
Hamburger SV	2004–05	Bundesliga	31	7	1	0	–		*1	0	33	7
Hamburger SV	2005–06	Bundesliga	21	1	2	1	–		*10	0	33	2
Hamburger SV	Total		97	13	6	2	3	1	13	0	119	16
Eintracht Frankfurt	2006–07	Bundesliga	30	11	4	4	–		5	2	39	17
Eintracht Frankfurt	2007–08	Bundesliga	8	1	2	0	–		–		10	1
Eintracht Frankfurt	Total		38	12	6	4	–		5	2	49	18
Urawa Reds	2008	J.League Division 1	27	6	1	0	3	1	4	1	35	8
Urawa Reds	2009	J.League Division 1	32	4	0	0	8	2	–		40	6
Urawa Reds	2010	J.League Division 1	4	0	0	0	1	1	–		5	1
Urawa Reds	Total		63	10	1	0	12	4	4	1	80	15
Suwon Samsung Bluewings	2010	K-League	12	4	1	0	–		1	0	14	4
Shimizu S-Pulse	2011	J.League Division 1	28	8	1	0	4	1	–		25	9
Shimizu S-Pulse	2012	J.League Division 1	18	1	0	0	2	0	–		20	1
Shimizu S-Pulse	Total		46	9	1	0	6	1	–		53	10
Tokyo Verdy	2013	J. League Division 2	41	11	0	0	–		–		41	11
Tokyo Verdy	2014	J. League Division 2	0	0	0	0	–		–		0	0
Tokyo Verdy	Total		41	11	0	0	–		–		41	11
SC Sagamihara	2014	J3 League	21	5	0	0	–		–		21	5
SC Sagamihara	2015	J3 League	33	6	0	0	–		–		33	6
SC Sagamihara	Total		54	11	0	0	–		–		54	11
Okinawa SV	2018	Kyushu Soccer League	17	11	–						17	11
Okinawa SV	2019	Kyushu Soccer League	11	7	2	1	–				19	8
Okinawa SV	2020	Kyushu Soccer League	4	5	1	0	–				5	5
Okinawa SV	2021	Kyushu Soccer League	15	5	1	0	–				16	5
Okinawa SV	2022	Kyushu Soccer League	13	2	1	0	–				14	2
Okinawa SV	2023	Japan Football League	2	0	0	0	–				2	0
Okinawa SV	Total		68	30	5	1	–				73	31
Career total			530	159	28	8	32	12	24	3	614	182

=== International ===
Appearances and goals by national team and year
National team	Year	Apps	Goals
Japan	2000	11	8
Japan	2001	4	0
Japan	2002	4	1
Japan	2003	8	2
Japan	2004	5	1
Japan	2005	7	2
Japan	2006	5	3
Japan	2007	9	6
Japan	2008	4	0
Total		57	23

Scores and results list Japan's goal tally first, score column indicates score after each Takahara goal.

List of international goals scored by Naohiro Takahara
No.	Date	Venue	Opponent	Score	Result	Competition
1	16 February 2000	Macau, China	Brunei		9–0	2000 AFC Asian Cup qualification
2	16 February 2000	Macau, China	Brunei		9–0	2000 AFC Asian Cup qualification
3	20 February 2000	Macau, China	Macau		3–0	2000 AFC Asian Cup qualification
4	14 October 2000	Sidon, Lebanon	Saudi Arabia		4–1	2000 AFC Asian Cup
5	17 October 2000	Sidon, Lebanon	Uzbekistan		8–1	2000 AFC Asian Cup
6	17 October 2000	Sidon, Lebanon	Uzbekistan		8–1	2000 AFC Asian Cup
7	17 October 2000	Sidon, Lebanon	Uzbekistan		8–1	2000 AFC Asian Cup
8	24 October 2000	Beirut, Lebanon	Iraq		4–1	2000 AFC Asian Cup
9	27 March 2002	Łódź, Poland	Poland		2–0	Friendly
10	20 August 2003	Tokyo, Japan	Nigeria		3–0	Friendly
11	20 August 2003	Tokyo, Japan	Nigeria		3–0	Friendly
12	31 March 2004	Jalan Besar, Singapore	Singapore		2–1	2006 FIFA World Cup qualification
13	7 September 2005	Rifu, Japan	Honduras		5–4	Friendly
14	8 October 2005	Riga, Latvia	Latvia		2–2	Friendly
15	28 February 2006	Dortmund, Germany	Bosnia and Herzegovina		2–2	Friendly
16	30 May 2006	Leverkusen, Germany	Germany		2–2	Friendly
17	30 May 2006	Leverkusen, Germany	Germany		2–2	Friendly
18	24 March 2007	Yokohama, Japan	Peru		2–0	Friendly
19	1 June 2007	Fukuroi, Japan	Montenegro		2–0	Friendly
20	9 July 2007	Hanoi, Vietnam	Qatar		1–1	2007 AFC Asian Cup
21	13 July 2007	Hanoi, Vietnam	United Arab Emirates		3–1	2007 AFC Asian Cup
22	13 July 2007	Hanoi, Vietnam	United Arab Emirates		3–1	2007 AFC Asian Cup
23	21 July 2007	Hanoi, Vietnam	Australia		1–1	2007 AFC Asian Cup

== Managerial statistics ==
As of 19 March 2023.

Managerial record by club and tenure
Team	From	To	Record				
Team	From	To	G	W	D	L	Win %
Okinawa SV	1 February 2016	31 January 2020	44	37	0	7	84.09
Okinawa SV	29 July 2021	present	40	30	6	4	75.00
Total			84	67	6	11	79.76

== Honours ==
Júbilo Iwata

- AFC Champions League: 1998–99
- Asian Super Cup: 1999
- J.League Division 1: 1999, 2002
- J.League Cup: 1998
- Japanese Super Cup: 2000

Hamburger SV

- DFB-Ligapokal: 2003
- UEFA Intertoto Cup: 2005

Okinawa SV (player-manager)

- Kyushu Soccer League: 2019, 2021, 2022
- Japanese Regional Football Champions League : 2022 (Runner-up)

Japan U17

- AFC U-17 Championship: 1994

Japan U20

- FIFA World Youth Championship runner-up: 1999

Japan

- AFC Asian Cup: 2000

Individual

- AFC U-19 Championship top scorer: 1998
- AFC Asian Cup Best Eleven: 2000
- Selected to AFC All Star Team: 2000
- J.League Most Valuable Player: 2002
- J.League Top Scorer: 2002
- J.League Best XI: 2002
- AFC Asian Cup top scorer: 2007 (shared)
