= 2014 SC Sagamihara season =

SC Sagamihara
2014 season
- Manager: Tetsumasa Kimura
- Stadium: Sagamihara Gion Stadium
- J3 League: 6th

2014 SC Sagamihara season.

== J3 League ==
Match	Date	Team	Score	Team	Venue	Attendance
1	2014.03.09	SC Sagamihara	0-4	Zweigen Kanazawa	Sagamihara Gion Stadium	2,873
2	2014.03.16	SC Sagamihara	2-0	YSCC Yokohama	Sagamihara Gion Stadium	2,183
3	2014.03.23	Gainare Tottori	1-0	SC Sagamihara	Tottori Bank Bird Stadium	2,535
4	2014.03.30	FC Machida Zelvia	2-0	SC Sagamihara	Machida Stadium	2,163
5	2014.04.06	SC Sagamihara	3-0	Blaublitz Akita	Sagamihara Gion Stadium	3,315
6	2014.04.13	FC Ryukyu	0-0	SC Sagamihara	Okinawa City Stadium	1,021
7	2014.04.20	SC Sagamihara	2-1	Fujieda MYFC	Sagamihara Gion Stadium	3,223
8	2014.04.26	Fukushima United FC	1-2	SC Sagamihara	Toho Stadium	1,001
9	2014.04.29	SC Sagamihara	0-1	J.League U-22 Selection	Sagamihara Gion Stadium	4,079
10	2014.05.04	Grulla Morioka	2-3	SC Sagamihara	Morioka Minami Park Stadium	1,763
11	2014.05.11	SC Sagamihara	2-2	AC Nagano Parceiro	Sagamihara Gion Stadium	4,258
12	2014.05.18	YSCC Yokohama	2-3	SC Sagamihara	NHK Spring Mitsuzawa Football Stadium	1,254
13	2014.05.25	Blaublitz Akita	1-0	SC Sagamihara	Akita Yabase Playing Field	1,917
14	2014.06.01	SC Sagamihara	4-0	FC Ryukyu	Sagamihara Gion Stadium	2,755
15	2014.06.08	FC Machida Zelvia	2-1	SC Sagamihara	Machida Stadium	3,519
16	2014.06.15	SC Sagamihara	0-1	Gainare Tottori	Sagamihara Gion Stadium	2,171
17	2014.06.21	Zweigen Kanazawa	2-1	SC Sagamihara	Ishikawa Athletics Stadium	3,023
18	2014.07.20	SC Sagamihara	2-3	J.League U-22 Selection	Sagamihara Gion Stadium	4,021
19	2014.07.27	SC Sagamihara	2-2	Fujieda MYFC	Sagamihara Gion Stadium	2,524
20	2014.08.03	Fukushima United FC	2-2	SC Sagamihara	Toho Stadium	4,163
21	2014.08.10	SC Sagamihara	0-0	Grulla Morioka	Sagamihara Gion Stadium	1,231
22	2014.08.24	SC Sagamihara	0-1	AC Nagano Parceiro	Sagamihara Gion Stadium	2,354
23	2014.08.30	YSCC Yokohama	2-4	SC Sagamihara	NHK Spring Mitsuzawa Football Stadium	1,037
24	2014.09.07	SC Sagamihara	1-0	Gainare Tottori	Sagamihara Gion Stadium	2,051
25	2014.09.14	Fujieda MYFC	1-1	SC Sagamihara	Fujieda Soccer Stadium	1,626
26	2014.09.21	SC Sagamihara	1-2	FC Machida Zelvia	Sagamihara Gion Stadium	5,630
27	2014.10.05	SC Sagamihara	1-1	FC Ryukyu	Sagamihara Gion Stadium	921
28	2014.10.12	SC Sagamihara	1-5	J.League U-22 Selection	Sagamihara Gion Stadium	2,307
29	2014.10.19	AC Nagano Parceiro	2-0	SC Sagamihara	Saku Athletic Stadium	4,179
30	2014.11.02	SC Sagamihara	1-0	Fukushima United FC	Sagamihara Gion Stadium	7,860
31	2014.11.09	Grulla Morioka	0-3	SC Sagamihara	Morioka Minami Park Stadium	1,623
32	2014.11.16	SC Sagamihara	2-1	Blaublitz Akita	Sagamihara Gion Stadium	2,632
33	2014.11.23	Zweigen Kanazawa	4-0	SC Sagamihara	Ishikawa Athletics Stadium	6,168
