= Fukuo =

Fukuo (written: 福緒) or Fukuō (written: 福王) are separate Japanese surnames. Notable people with either surname include:

- Tadayo Fukuo (福王 忠世, born 1984), Japanese footballer
- Yui Fukuo (福緒 唯, born 1994), Japanese voice actress
