= Tadayo Fukuo =

Japanese footballer

Tadayo Fukuo 福王 忠世
Personal information
- Full name: Tadayo Fukuo
- Date of birth: May 6, 1984 (age 42)
- Place of birth: Nishinomiya, Hyogo, Japan
- Height: 1.78 m (5 ft 10 in)
- Position: Defender

Youth career
- 2000–2002: Cerezo Osaka

Senior career*
Years	Team	Apps	(Gls)
2003–2004	Cerezo Osaka	0	(0)
2005–2013	Roasso Kumamoto	182	(8)
2014	Gainare Tottori	25	(0)
2015–2017	Fujieda MYFC	48	(1)
Total		255	(9)

International career
2001	Japan U-17	3	(0)
Medal record
Cerezo Osaka
Runner-up	Emperor's Cup	2003
- * Club domestic league appearances and goals

Tadayo Fukuo (福王 忠世, Fukuō Tadayo; born May 6, 1984) is a former Japanese football player.

== Club career ==
Fukuo was born in Nishinomiya on May 6, 1984. He joined Cerezo Osaka from youth team in 2003. However he did not play in the match. He moved to Regional Leagues club Rosso Kumamoto (later Roasso Kumamoto) in 2005. He played as center back in many matches. The club also was promoted to Japan Football League in 2006 and J2 League in 2008. Although he played as regular player until 2010, his opportunity to play decreased from 2011. He moved to J3 League club Gainare Tottori in 2014 and Fujieda MYFC in 2015. He retired end of 2017 season.

== National team career ==
In September 2001, he was selected Japan U-17 national team for 2001 U-17 World Championship. He played full time in all 3 matches.

== Career statistics ==
Appearances and goals by club, season and competition
Club	Season	League			Emperor's Cup		J.League Cup		Total	
Club	Season	Division	Apps	Goals	Apps	Goals	Apps	Goals	Apps	Goals
Cerezo Osaka	2003	J1 League	0	0	0	0	0	0	0	0
Cerezo Osaka	2004	J1 League	0	0	0	0	0	0	0	0
Rosso Kumamoto	2005	Regional Leagues	17	1	1	0	-		18	1
Rosso Kumamoto	2006	Football League	25	3	2	0	-		27	3
Rosso Kumamoto	2007	Football League	8	0	0	0	-		8	0
Roasso Kumamoto	2008	J2 League	31	0	1	0	-		32	0
Roasso Kumamoto	2009	J2 League	35	3	1	0	-		36	3
Roasso Kumamoto	2010	J2 League	33	1	2	1	-		35	2
Roasso Kumamoto	2011	J2 League	17	0	1	0	-		18	0
Roasso Kumamoto	2012	J2 League	11	0	1	0	-		12	0
Roasso Kumamoto	2013	J2 League	5	0	0	0	-		5	0
Gainare Tottori	2014	J3 League	25	0	2	0	-		27	0
Fujieda MYFC	2015	J3 League	23	0	2	0	-		25	0
Fujieda MYFC	2016	J3 League	23	1	-		-		23	1
Fujieda MYFC	2017	J3 League	2	0	-		-		2	0
Career total			255	9	12	1	0	0	267	10
