= Koichi Maeda =

Japanese footballer

Koichi Maeda 前田 晃一
Personal information
- Full name: Koichi Maeda
- Date of birth: May 28, 1991 (age 35)
- Place of birth: Osaka, Japan
- Height: 1.80 m (5 ft 11 in)
- Position: Defender

Team information
- Current team: Nara Club
- Number: 6

Youth career
- 2010–2013: Kansai University

Senior career*
| Years | Team | Apps | (Gls) |
| 2014–2015 | FC Ryukyu | 37 | (0) |
| 2015 | Renofa Yamaguchi | 10 | (0) |
| 2016 | Fujieda MYFC | 29 | (0) |
| 2017– | Nara Club | 38 | (3) |
- * Club domestic league appearances and goals as of 18 November 2018

Koichi Maeda (前田 晃一, Maeda Koichi; born May 28, 1991) is a Japanese football player for Nara Club.

== Club statistics ==
Updated to 18 November 2018.

| Club performance | | | League | | Cup | | Total | |
| Season | Club | League | Apps | Goals | Apps | Goals | Apps | Goals |
| Japan | | | League | | Emperor's Cup | | Total | |
|---|---|---|---|---|---|---|---|---|
| 2014 | FC Ryukyu | J3 League | 18 | 0 | 2 | 0 | 20 | 0 |
| 2015 | FC Ryukyu | J3 League | 19 | 0 | – | | 19 | 0 |
| 2015 | Renofa Yamaguchi | J3 League | 10 | 0 | 1 | 0 | 11 | 0 |
| 2016 | Fujieda MYFC | J3 League | 29 | 0 | 1 | 0 | 30 | 0 |
| 2017 | Nara Club | JFL | 24 | 1 | 1 | 0 | 25 | 1 |
| 2018 | Nara Club | JFL | 14 | 2 | 2 | 0 | 16 | 2 |
| 2019 | Nara Club | JFL | | | | | | |
| Career total | | | 114 | 3 | 7 | 0 | 121 | 3 |
