= Shohei Shinzato =

Japanese footballer

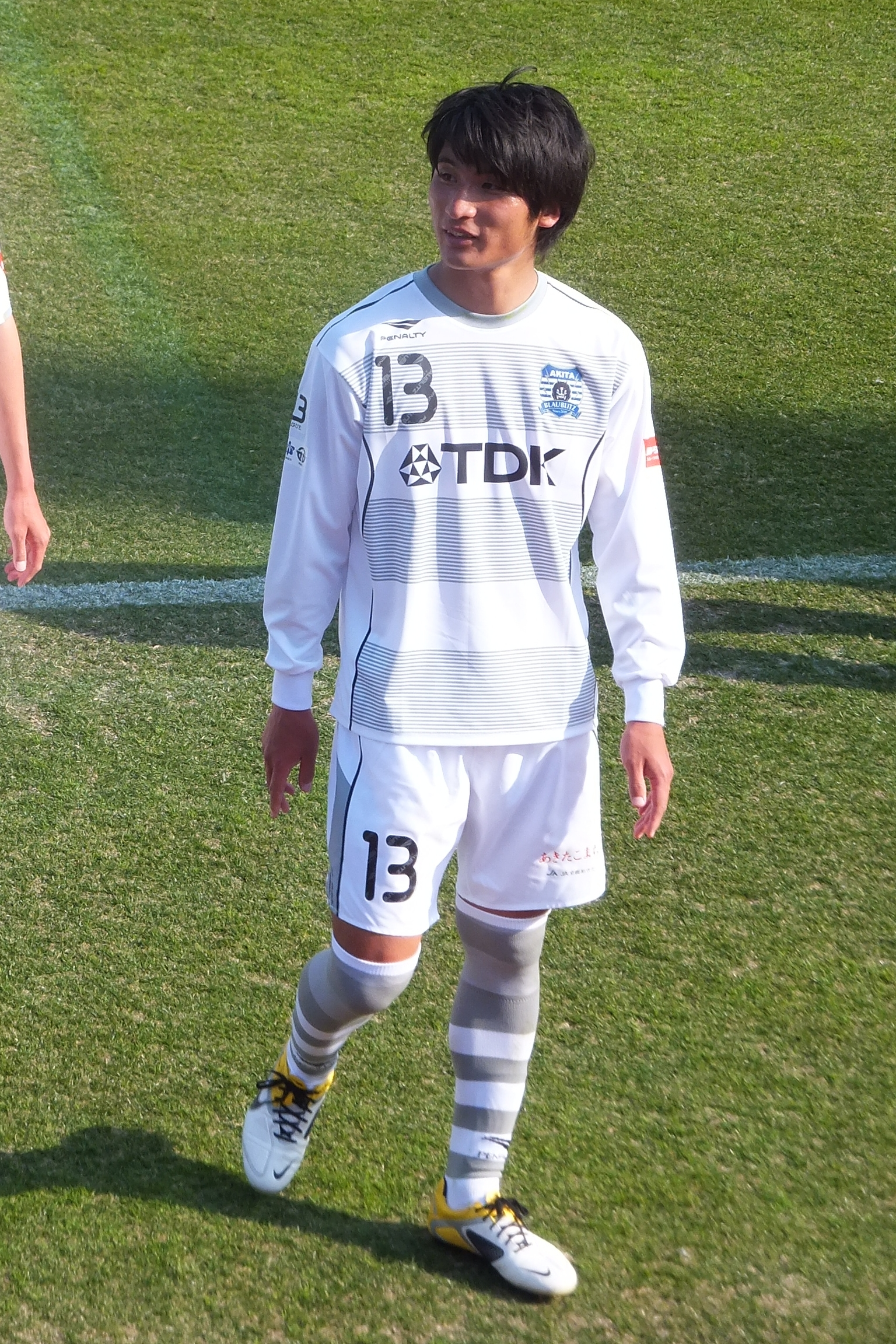
- Shohei Shinzato in 2014.

Personal information
- Full name: Shohei Shinzato
- Date of birth: 11 May 1988 (age 38)
- Place of birth: Chiba, Japan
- Height: 1.76 m (5 ft 9 in)
- Position: Defender

Youth career
- –2010: Toyo University

Senior career*
Years	Team	Apps	(Gls)
2011– 2016	Blaublitz Akita	166	(0)
2018	Akita FC Cambiare	8	(0)
- * Club domestic league appearances and goals as of 8 July 2020

Shohei Shinzato (新里 彰平, Shinzato Shōhei; born 11 May 1988 in Chiba) is a Japanese footballer who plays for Blaublitz Akita.

== Club statistics ==
Updated to 23 February 2016.

Club performance			League		Cup		Total	
Season	Club	League	Apps	Goals	Apps	Goals	Apps	Goals
Japan			League		Emperor's Cup		Total	
2011	Blaublitz Akita	JFL	19	0	0	0	19	0
2012	Blaublitz Akita	JFL	20	0	2	0	22	0
2013	Blaublitz Akita	JFL	32	0	2	0	34	0
2014	Blaublitz Akita	J3 League	30	0	2	1	32	1
2015	Blaublitz Akita	J3 League	34	0	2	0	36	0
Career total			135	0	8	1	143	1
