= Ryosuke Kakigi =

Japanese footballer (born 1991)

Ryosuke Kakigi 柿木亮介
Personal information
- Full name: Ryosuke Kakigi
- Date of birth: 23 December 1991 (age 34)
- Place of birth: Ashiya, Hyōgo, Japan
- Height: 1.68 m (5 ft 6 in)
- Position: Midfielder

Youth career
- 2010–2013: Osaka Gakuin University

Senior career*
Years	Team	Apps	(Gls)
2014–2015	Gainare Tottori	48	(0)
2016–2018	Fujieda MYFC	48	(3)
2019	Ococias Kyoto AC	10	(1)
- * Club domestic league appearances and goals as of 23 February 2020

Ryosuke Kakigi (柿木 亮介, Kakigi Ryōsuke; born 23 December 1991) is a former Japanese footballer.

== Club statistics ==
Updated to 23 February 2020.

Club performance			League		Cup		Total	
Season	Club	League	Apps	Goals	Apps	Goals	Apps	Goals
Japan			League		Emperor's Cup		Total	
2014	Gainare Tottori	J3 League	16	0	1	0	17	0
2015	Gainare Tottori	J3 League	32	0	2	0	34	0
2016	Fujieda MYFC	J3 League	22	1	–		22	1
2017	Fujieda MYFC	J3 League	25	2	–		25	2
2018	Fujieda MYFC	J3 League	1	0	–		1	0
2019	Ococias Kyoto AC	JRL (Kansai, Div. 1)	10	1	–		10	1
Career total			106	4	3	0	109	4
