= Ryosuke Hisadomi =

Japanese footballer (born 1991)

Ryosuke Hisadomi 久富 良輔
Personal information
- Full name: Ryosuke Hisadomi
- Date of birth: March 19, 1991 (age 35)
- Place of birth: Yugawara, Japan
- Height: 1.77 m (5 ft 10 in)
- Position: Right back

Team information
- Current team: Fujieda MYFC
- Number: 22

Youth career
- –2002: Yugawara SSS
- 2003–2005: Yugawara Junior High School
- 2006–2008: Toyo High School

College career
| Years | Team | Apps | (Gls) |
| 2009–2012 | Sanno Institute of Management | | |

Senior career*
| Years | Team | Apps | (Gls) |
| 2013 | Thespa Kusatsu Challengers | 10 | (3) |
| 2014–2015 | Thespakusatsu Gunma | 32 | (1) |
| 2016–2017 | Fujieda MYFC | 59 | (4) |
| 2018–2019 | Tochigi SC | 52 | (0) |
| 2020– | Fujieda MYFC | 163 | (10) |
- * Club domestic league appearances and goals as of 13 August 2026

Ryosuke Hisadomi (久富 良輔, Hisadomi Ryosuke; born March 19, 1991) is a Japanese professional footballer who plays as a right back for Fujieda MYFC.

== Career statistics ==
Updated to 23 February 2020.

Appearances and goals by club, season and competition
| Club | Season | League | | | Emperor's Cup | | Total | |
| Club | Season | Division | Apps | Goals | Apps | Goals | Apps | Goals |
|---|---|---|---|---|---|---|---|---|
| Thespakusatsu Gunma | 2014 | J2 League | 14 | 1 | 1 | 0 | 15 | 1 |
| Thespakusatsu Gunma | 2015 | J2 League | 18 | 0 | 1 | 0 | 19 | 0 |
| Fujieda MYFC | 2016 | J3 League | 30 | 4 | – | | 30 | 4 |
| Fujieda MYFC | 2017 | J3 League | 29 | 0 | 0 | 0 | 29 | 0 |
| Tochigi SC | 2018 | J2 League | 21 | 0 | 1 | 0 | 22 | 0 |
| Tochigi SC | 2019 | J2 League | 31 | 1 | 1 | 0 | 32 | 1 |
| Career total | | | 153 | 6 | 4 | 0 | 157 | 6 |
