= Kota Sameshima =

Japanese footballer

Kota Sameshima 鮫島 晃太
Personal information
- Full name: Kota Sameshima
- Date of birth: 24 June 1992 (age 34)
- Place of birth: Makurazaki, Kagoshima, Japan
- Height: 1.80 m (5 ft 11 in)
- Position: Midfielder

Team information
- Current team: Fujieda MYFC
- Number: 16

Youth career
- 2008–2010: Kagoshima Jōsei High School

Senior career*
Years	Team	Apps	(Gls)
2011–2015	Sanfrecce Hiroshima	0	(0)
2013	→ Gainare Tottori (loan)	17	(0)
2014–2015	→ Nagano Parceiro (loan)	4	(0)
2016–	Fujieda MYFC	44	(6)
Medal record
Sanfrecce Hiroshima
Winner	J1 League	2012
Winner	J1 League	2013
Runner-up	Emperor's Cup	2013
- * Club domestic league appearances and goals as of 23 February 2018

Kota Sameshima (鮫島 晃太, Sameshima Kōta; born 24 June 1992) is a Japanese football player for Fujieda MYFC.

== Club statistics ==
Updated to 23 February 2018.

Club	Season	League		Cup^{1}		League Cup^{2}		Asia^{3}		Other^{4}		Total	
Club	Season	Apps	Goals	Apps	Goals	Apps	Goals	Apps	Goals	Apps	Goals	Apps	Goals
Sanfrecce Hiroshima	2011	0	0	0	0	0	0	-		-		0	0
Sanfrecce Hiroshima	2012	0	0	1	0	2	0	-		0	0	3	0
Sanfrecce Hiroshima	2013	0	0	-		0	0	0	0	-		0	0
Gainare Tottori	2013	17	0	0	0	-		-		-		17	0
Nagano Parceiro	2014	2	0	1	0	-		-		-		3	0
Nagano Parceiro	2015	2	0	0	0	-		-		-		2	0
Fujieda MYFC	2016	30	6	0	0	-		-		-		30	6
Fujieda MYFC	2017	14	0	0	0	-		-		-		14	0
Total		65	6	2	0	2	0	0	0	0	0	69	6

^{1}Includes Emperor's Cup.

^{2}Includes J. League Cup.

^{3}Includes AFC Champions League.

^{4}Includes FIFA Club World Cup.
