= Atsuto Oishi =

Japanese footballer (born 1976)

Atsuto Oishi 大石 篤人
Personal information
- Full name: Atsuto Oishi
- Date of birth: October 24, 1976 (age 50)
- Place of birth: Osaka, Japan
- Height: 1.76 m (5 ft 9 in)
- Position: Midfielder

Youth career
- 1992–1994: Gamba Osaka
- 1995–1998: Komazawa University

Senior career*
Years	Team	Apps	(Gls)
1999	Ventforet Kofu	5	(0)
Total		5	(0)

Managerial career
- 2015–2018: Fujieda MYFC
- 2019: Vanraure Hachinohe
- * Club domestic league appearances and goals

Atsuto Oishi (大石 篤人, Oishi Atsuto; born October 24, 1976) is a former Japanese football player and manager.

== Playing career ==
Oishi was born in Osaka Prefecture on October 24, 1976. After graduating from Komazawa University, he joined newly was promoted to J2 League club, Ventforet Kofu in 1999. On April 18, he debuted as substitute midfielder from the 75th minute against Montedio Yamagata. He played several matches as offensive midfielder until May. However he could not play at all in the match from June and retired end of 1999 season.

== Coaching career ==
In 2014, Oishi signed with newly was promoted to J3 League club, Fujieda MYFC and became a coach under manager Musashi Mizushima. In 2015, he became a manager as Mizushima successor. Although the club finished at 10th place of 13 clubs in 2015 season, the club rose at middle place in 2016 season and 2017 season. However the club results were bad in 2018 and he resigned in July when at 14th place of 17 clubs. In 2019, he signed with newly was promoted to J3 club Vanraure Hachinohe.

== Career statistics ==
Appearances and goals by club, season and competition
Club	Season	League			Emperor's Cup		J.League Cup		Total	
Club	Season	Division	Apps	Goals	Apps	Goals	Apps	Goals	Apps	Goals
Ventforet Kofu	1999	J2 League	5	0			0	0	5	0
Career total			5	0	0	0	0	0	5	0

== Managerial statistics ==
Update; December 31, 2018

Team	From	To	Record				
Team	From	To	G	W	D	L	Win %
Fujieda MYFC	2015	2018	115	43	21	51	37.39
Vanraure Hachinohe	2019	present					
Total			115	43	21	51	37.39
