= Daiki Asada =

Japanese footballer (born 1989)

Daiki Asada 浅田大樹
Personal information
- Full name: Daiki Asada
- Date of birth: 5 April 1989 (age 37)
- Place of birth: Saitama, Japan
- Height: 1.84 m (6 ft 0 in)
- Position: Defender

Team information
- Current team: Fujieda MYFC
- Number: 5

Youth career
- 2005–2007: Teikyo High School
- 2008–2011: Hosei University

Senior career*
Years	Team	Apps	(Gls)
2012–2013	Honda FC	62	(0)
2014–2015	FC Ryukyu	65	(2)
2016–	Fujieda MYFC	57	(3)
- * Club domestic league appearances and goals as of 23 February 2018

Daiki Asada (浅田大樹, Asada Daiki; born 5 April 1989) is a Japanese footballer who plays for Fujieda MYFC.

== Club statistics ==
Updated to 23 February 2018.

Club performance			League		Cup		Total	
Season	Club	League	Apps	Goals	Apps	Goals	Apps	Goals
Japan			League		Emperor's Cup		Total	
2012	Honda FC	JFL	28	0	–		28	0
2013	Honda FC	JFL	34	0	–		34	0
2014	FC Ryukyu	J3 League	31	1	1	0	32	1
2015	FC Ryukyu	J3 League	34	1	2	0	36	1
2016	Fujieda MYFC	J3 League	26	2	–		26	2
2017	Fujieda MYFC	J3 League	31	1	–		31	1
Career total			184	5	3	0	187	5
