= Hirochika Miyoshi =

Japanese footballer

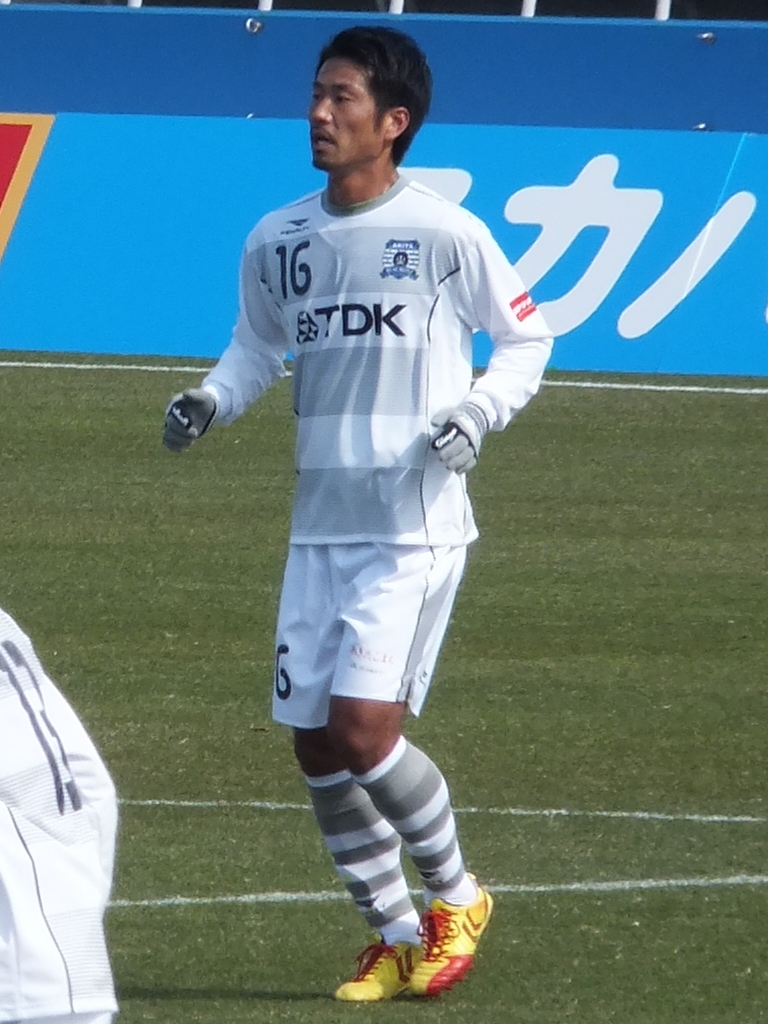

Personal information
- Full name: Hirochika Miyoshi
- Date of birth: May 17, 1987 (age 39)
- Place of birth: Isahaya, Nagasaki, Japan
- Height: 1.78 m (5 ft 10 in)
- Position: Forward

Youth career
- Oita Trinita U-18
- 2006–2009: Osaka Kyoiku University

Senior career*
| Years | Team | Apps | (Gls) |
| 2010–2015 | Blaublitz Akita | 132 | (23) |
| 2016–2017 | Fujieda MYFC | 44 | (8) |
- * Club domestic league appearances and goals as of 2 February 2018

Hirochika Miyoshi (三好洋央, Miyoshi Hirochika; born May 17, 1987) is a former Japanese football player, who last played for Fujieda MYFC as a forward.

== Career ==
Already considered by Oita Trinita through its youth ranks, Miyoshi attended Osaka Kyoiku University before playing for Blaublitz Akita. After five seasons, he left Akita to join Fujieda MYFC in winter 2016.

== Club statistics ==
Updated to 2 February 2018.

| Club performance | | | League | | Cup | | Total | |
| Season | Club | League | Apps | Goals | Apps | Goals | Apps | Goals |
| Japan | | | League | | Emperor's Cup | | Total | |
|---|---|---|---|---|---|---|---|---|
| 2010 | Blaublitz Akita | JFL | 1 | 0 | 0 | 0 | 1 | 0 |
| 2011 | Blaublitz Akita | JFL | 22 | 0 | 2 | 1 | 24 | 1 |
| 2012 | Blaublitz Akita | JFL | 29 | 3 | 2 | 0 | 31 | 3 |
| 2013 | Blaublitz Akita | JFL | 31 | 5 | 2 | 0 | 33 | 5 |
| 2014 | Blaublitz Akita | J3 League | 32 | 12 | 2 | 3 | 34 | 15 |
| 2015 | Blaublitz Akita | J3 League | 17 | 3 | 0 | 0 | 17 | 3 |
| 2016 | Fujieda MYFC | J3 League | 28 | 6 | – | | 28 | 6 |
| 2017 | Fujieda MYFC | J3 League | 16 | 2 | 0 | 0 | 16 | 2 |
| Total | | | 176 | 31 | 8 | 4 | 184 | 35 |
