= Takanori Miyake =

Japanese footballer (born 1992)

Takanori Miyake 三宅貴憲
Personal information
- Full name: Takanori Miyake
- Date of birth: 15 February 1992 (age 34)
- Place of birth: Osaka, Japan
- Height: 1.85 m (6 ft 1 in)
- Position: Goalkeeper

Youth career
- 2010–2013: Kyoto Sangyo University

Senior career*
Years	Team	Apps	(Gls)
2014–2015	Blaublitz Akita	5	(0)
2016–2017	Fujieda MYFC	31	(0)
2018	Nara Club	0	(0)
2019–	Ococias Kyoto AC	1	(0)
- * Club domestic league appearances and goals as of 23 February 2020

Takanori Miyake (三宅貴憲, Miyake Takanori; born 15 February 1992) is a Japanese former footballer who last played for Ococias Kyoto AC.

== Career ==
Firstly signed by Blaublitz Akita for the maiden season of J3 League, he switched to Fujieda MYFC after two seasons.

== Club statistics ==
Updated to 23 February 2020.

Club performance			League		Cup		Total	
Season	Club	League	Apps	Goals	Apps	Goals	Apps	Goals
Japan			League		Cup		Total	
2014	Blaublitz Akita	J3 League	5	0	0	0	5	0
2015	Blaublitz Akita	J3 League	0	0	0	0	0	0
2016	Fujieda MYFC	J3 League	26	0	–		26	0
2017	Fujieda MYFC	J3 League	5	0	–		5	0
2018	Nara Club	JFL	0	0	0	0	0	0
2019	Ococias Kyoto AC	JRL (Kansai)	1	0	–		1	0
Career total			37	0	0	0	37	0
