= All Gainare Yajin Stadium =

Football stadium in Yonago, Tottori Prefecture, Japan

- オールガイナーレYAJINスタジアム
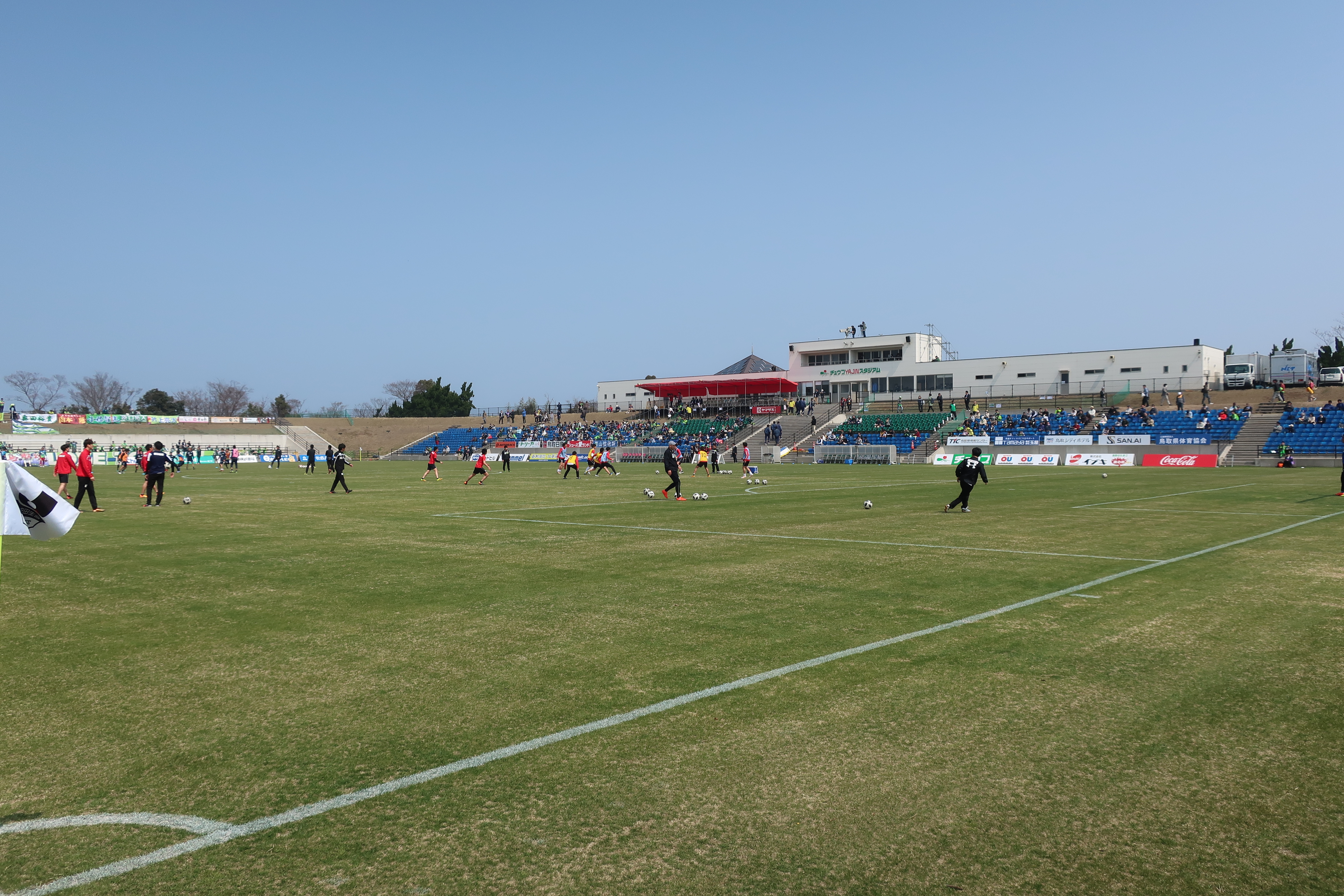
- Interactive map of All Gainare Yajin Stadium
- Location: Yonago, Tottori, Japan
- Coordinates: 35.4482°N 133.3075°E
- Capacity: 7,390

Construction
- Opened: 2012

Tenant
- Gainare Tottori

Website
- Official site

All Gainare Yajin Stadium (オールガイナーレYAJINスタジアム) is a football stadium in Yonago, Tottori Prefecture, Japan.

It is one of the home stadiums of football club Gainare Tottori.
