= Axis Bird Stadium =

Stadium in Tottori, Japan

Coordinates: 35°27′30″N 134°13′18″E

- Axis Bird Stadium
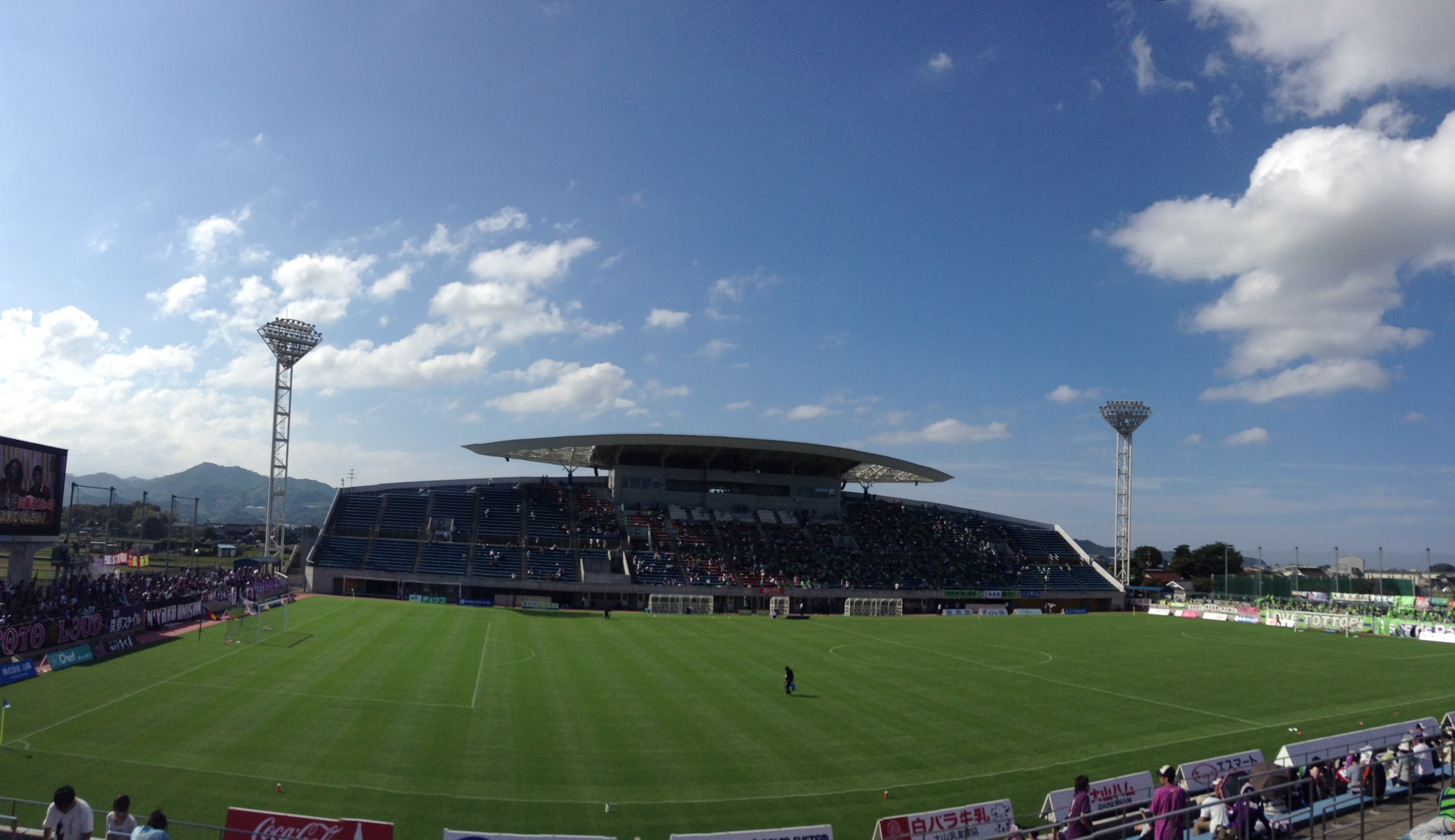
- Interactive map of Axis Bird Stadium
- Full name: Tottori Municipal Soccer Field
- Former names: Tottori Stadium (1995-2008); Tottori Bank Bird Stadium(2008-2020)
- Location: Tottori, Tottori
- Owner: City of Tottori
- Operator: Tottori Prefecture Football Association
- Capacity: 16,033
- Field size: 120 m × 80 m 131.2 yds × 87.4 yds

Construction
- Built: 1995
- Opened: 1995

Tenant
- Gainare Tottori

The Axis Bird Stadium (Axis バードスタジアム) is a 16,033-capacity multi-purpose stadium in Tottori, Tottori. The stadium is home to J3 League side Gainare Tottori. The stadium hosted Ecuador's national selection during the 2002 FIFA World Cup.

It was formerly known as Tottori Stadium. Since April 2008 it has been called Tottori Bank Bird Stadium for the naming rights.

The stadium has also hosted rugby union games. It is one of the few soccer-specific stadiums built in Japan before the 2002 FIFA World Cup boom, and as such Gainare Tottori uses it as part of its bid to be promoted to the J.League, since their home stadium in Yonago was built for athletics and the town has no money for upgrading it.

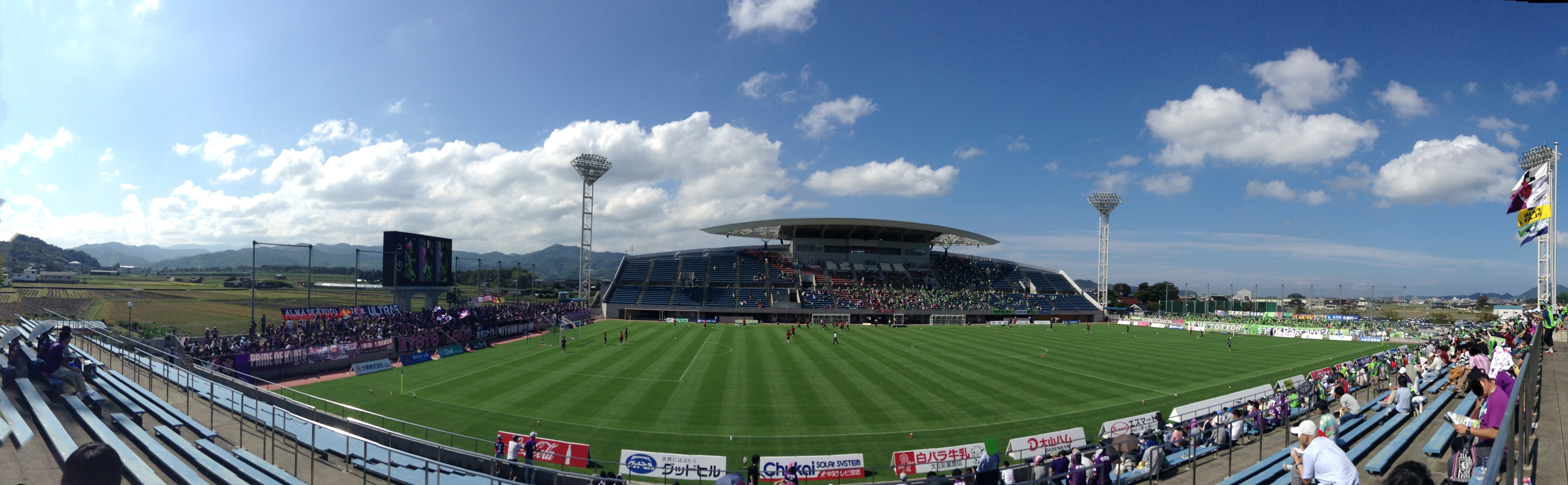
Panoramic view in 2013
