= Fujieda Soccer Stadium =

Sports venue in Fujieda, Shizuoka Prefecture, Japan

Coordinates: 34.8815°N 138.2328°E

- 藤枝総合運動公園サッカー場
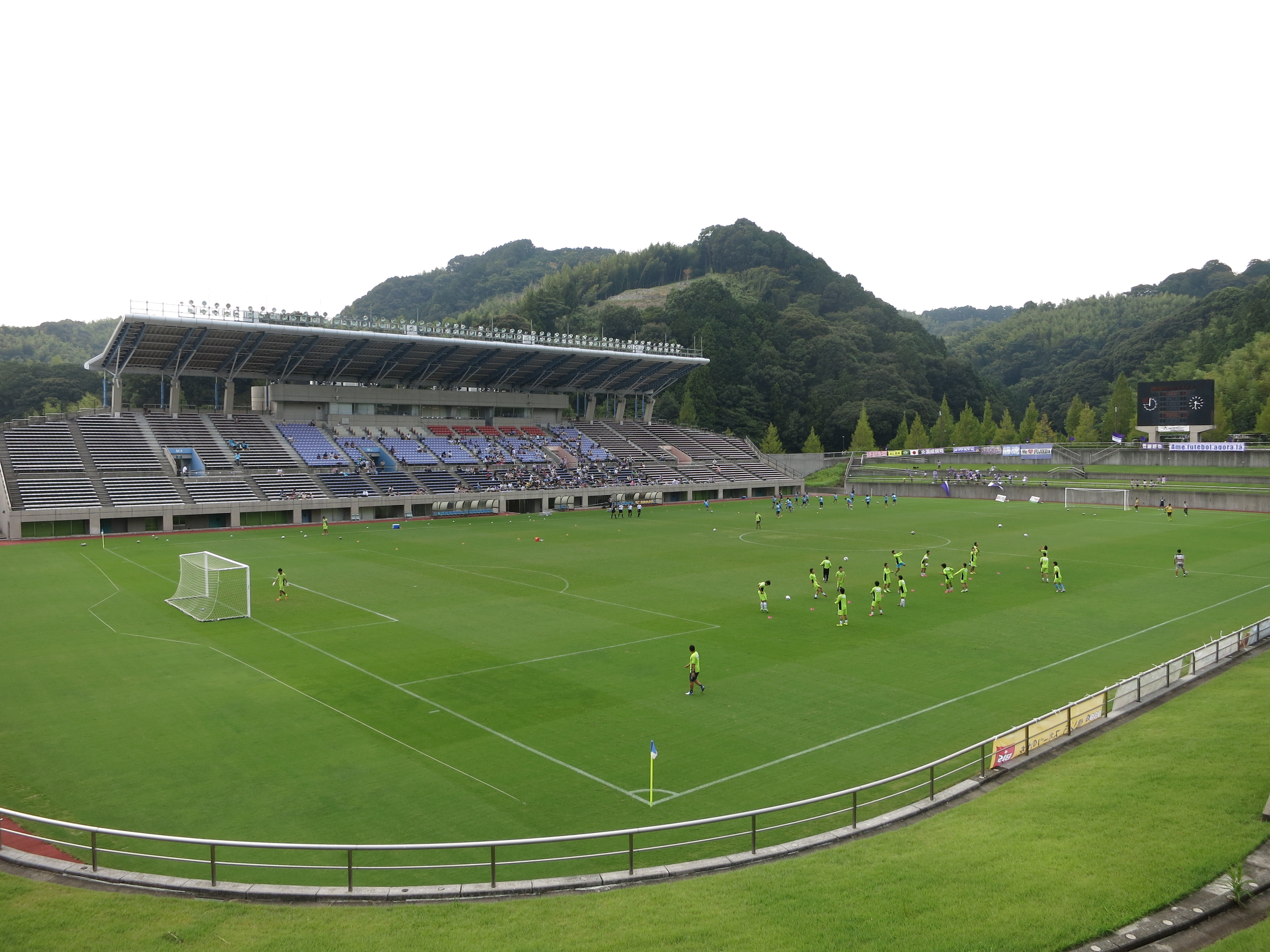
- Interactive map of Fujieda Soccer Stadium
- Location: Fujieda, Shizuoka, Japan
- Owner: Shizuoka Prefecture
- Operator: Fujieda City Football Association Group
- Capacity: 13,000

Construction
- Opened: 2002
- Renovated: 2022–2023
- Expanded: 2022–2023

Tenant
- Fujieda MYFC

Fujieda Soccer Stadium (藤枝総合運動公園サッカー場) is a multi-use stadium built in Fujieda, Shizuoka Prefecture, Japan. Senegal used it for a precursory 2002 FIFA World Cup training camp. It is the home stadium of football club Fujieda MYFC.

The stadium is football-specific, with floodlights and a main stand equipped to seat 5000, evidently on par with J1 League stadia. The rest of the stands are grass terracing. It has an athletics field, a golf course, a skate park, and a football pitch.

This stadium has been renovated from 21 May 2022 until the renovation is completed, scheduled from the end of 2023.

== Gallery ==
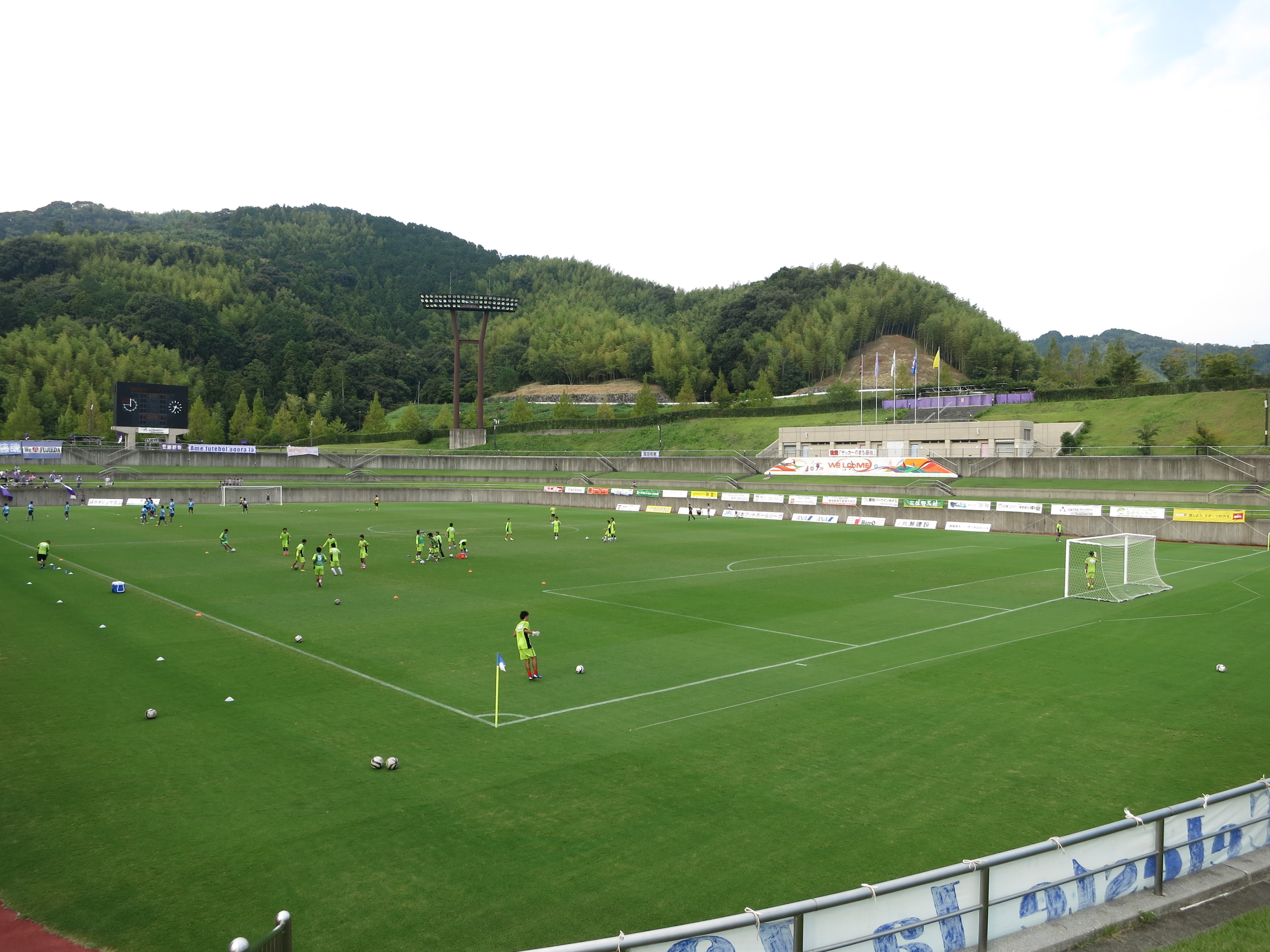

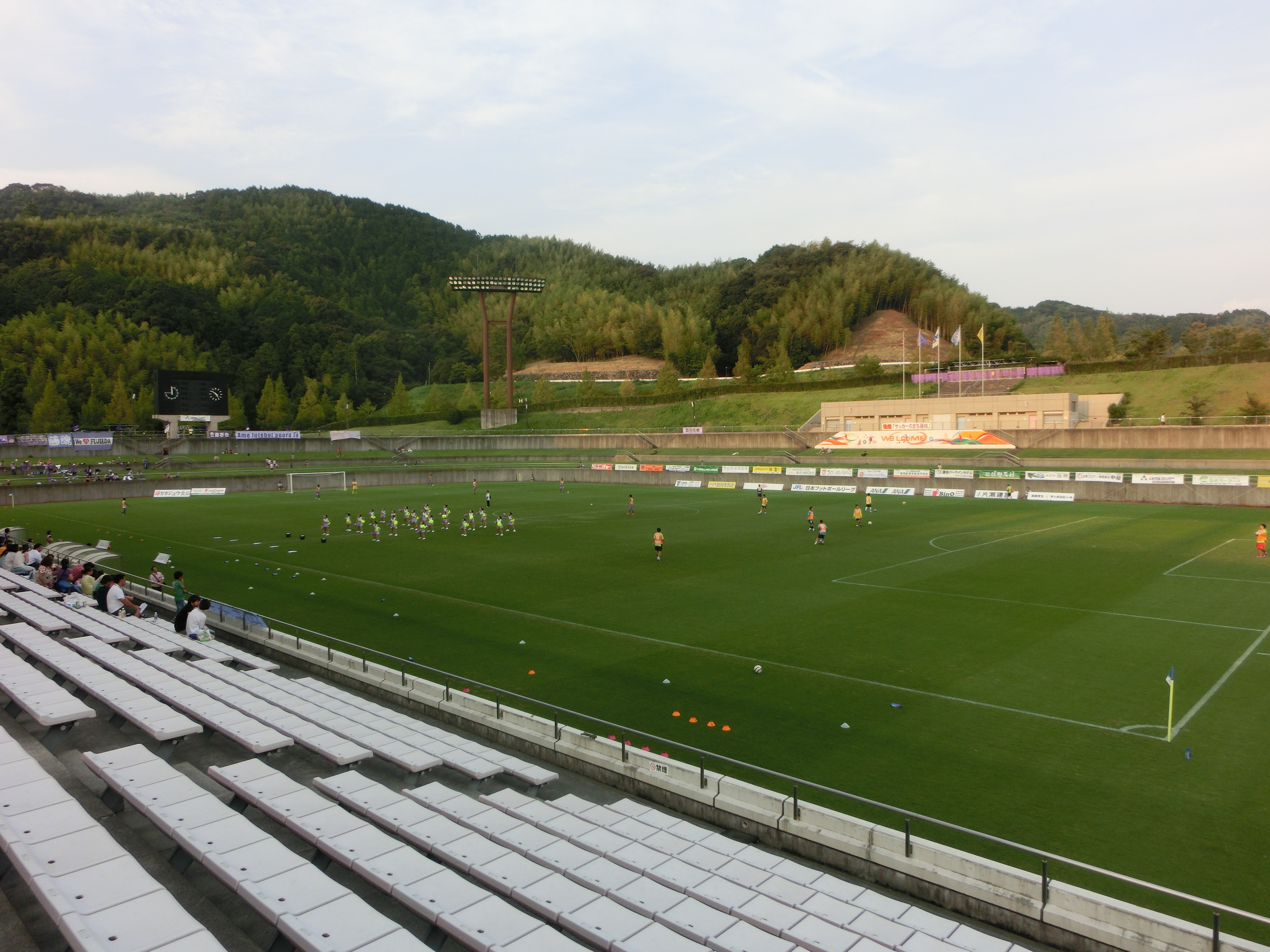

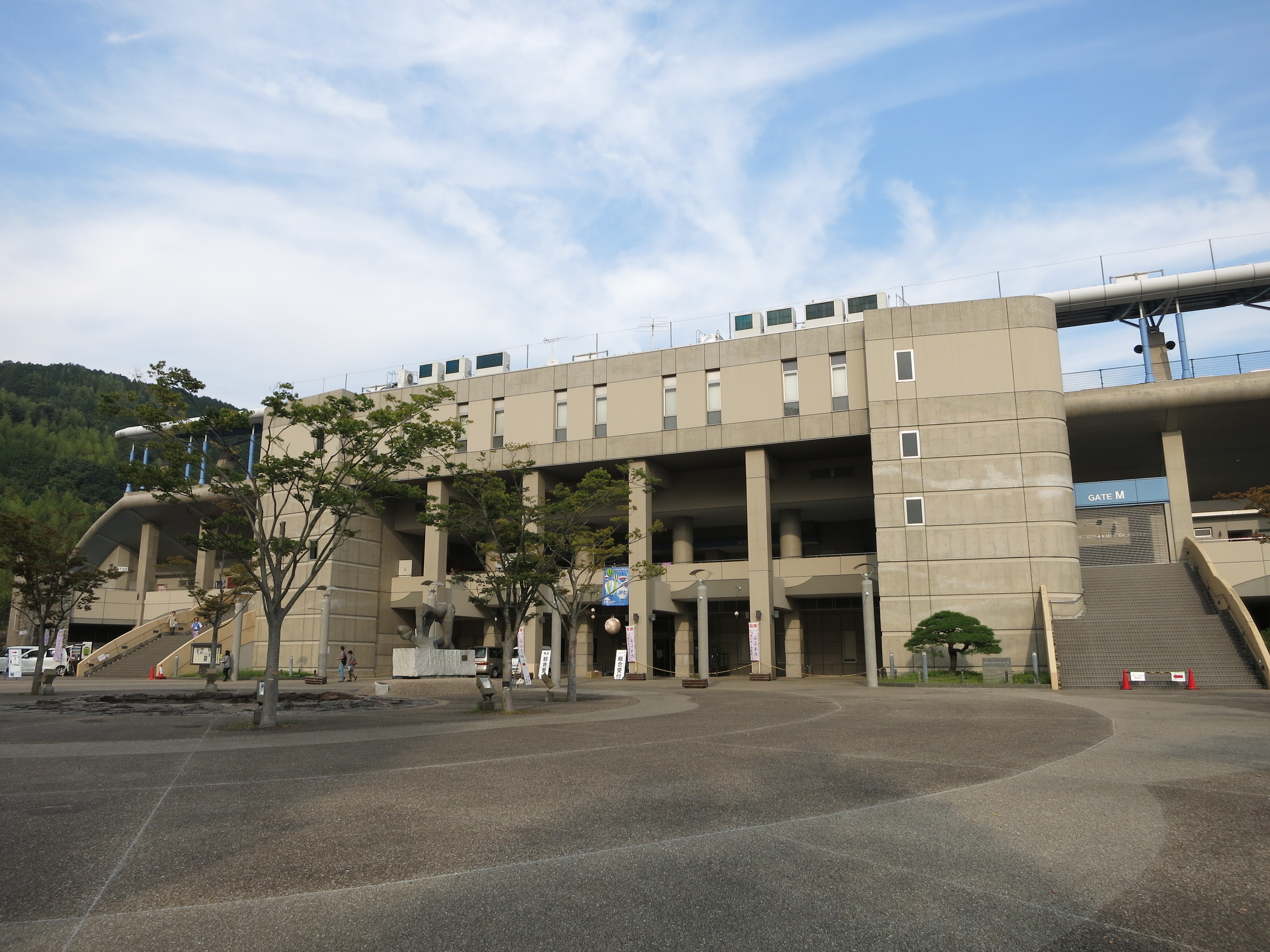

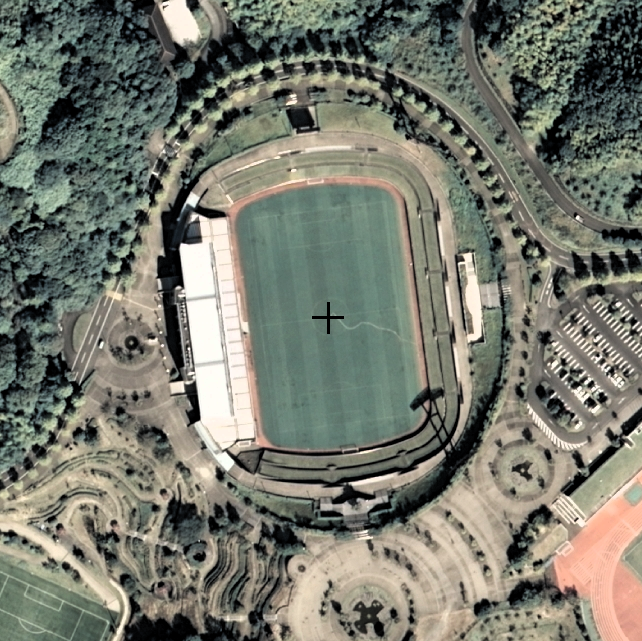
