= Sagamihara Gion Stadium =

Multi-use stadium in Minami-ku, Japan

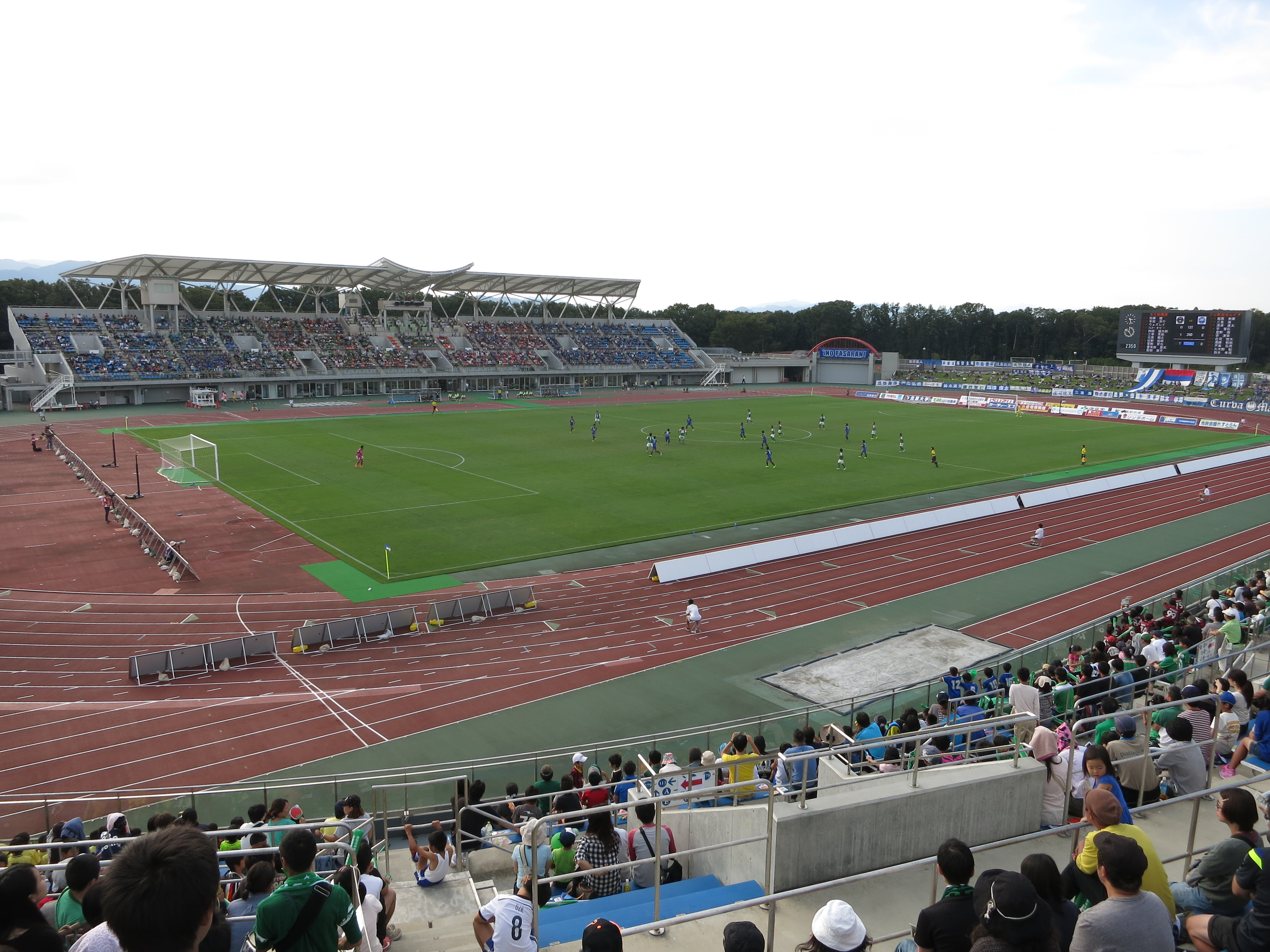
- Interactive map of Sagamihara Gion Stadium
- Former names: Sagamihara Asamizo Stadium (2007-2014)
- Location: Minami-ku, Sagamihara, Japan
- Coordinates: 35°31′40″N 139°23′10″E
- Owner: Sagamihara City
- Operator: Sagamihara Sports Association Group
- Capacity: 15,300; J League:6,291
- Surface: Grass
- Public transit: JR East: Sagami Line at Harataima

Construction
- Opened: 2007

Tenants
- SC Sagamihara; FC Machida Zelvia (2010); Nojima Stella Kanagawa Sagamihara; Mitsubishi Sagamihara DynaBoars; Nojima Sagamihara Rise

Sagamihara Gion Stadium (相模原ギオンスタジアム) is a multi-use stadium in Minami-ku, Sagamihara, Japan. It was formerly known as Sagamihara Asamizo Stadium since it is located in Sagamihara Asamizo Park.

Since the naming rights were sold in March 2014, it has been called Sagamihara Gion Stadium. It is currently used mostly for football matches and athletics events and is the home ground of SC Sagamihara. This stadium has a seating capacity of 11,808.
