= 2017 FC Ryukyu season =

FC Ryukyu
2017 season
- Manager: Kim Jong-song
- Stadium: Okinawa Athletic Park Stadium
- J3 League: 6th
Home colours	Away colours

2017 FC Ryukyu season.

== Squad ==
Note: Flags indicate national team as defined under FIFA eligibility rules; some limited exceptions apply. Players may hold more than one non-FIFA nationality.

No.	Pos.	Nation	Player
1	GK	KOR	Park Iru-gyu
2	DF	JPN	Kosuke Masutani
3	DF	JPN	Taishi Nishioka
4	MF	JPN	Yutaro Chinen
5	MF	KOR	Kang Ju-kwang
6	MF	JPN	Keisuke Tanabe
7	MF	JPN	Park Ri-ki
8	MF	JPN	Noritaka Fujisawa
9	FW	JPN	Yuta Togashi
10	MF	JPN	Yu Tomidokoro
11	FW	JPN	Ryuji Saito
13	DF	JPN	Katsuhiro Hamada
14	FW	JPN	Satoki Uejo
15	MF	JPN	Tatsuya Mochizuki

No.	Pos.	Nation	Player
16	DF	JPN	Tatsuro Yamauchi
17	GK	JPN	Keisuke Tsumita
18	FW	JPN	Hiroki Maeda
19	MF	KOR	Choe Byeong-gil
20	FW	JPN	Aio Fukuda
21	GK	JPN	Taisuke Konno
22	DF	JPN	Shuhei Takizawa
23	FW	JPN	Desheun Ryo Yamakawa
24	DF	KOR	Kim Hyun-beom
25	DF	JPN	Yu Tamagawa
26	DF	JPN	Mikihito Arai
28	MF	JPN	Takumi Nagura
29	GK	KOR	Lee Kyung-tae

== J3 League ==
Match !Date	Team	Score	Team	Venue	Attendance	
1	2017.03.12	Tochigi SC	0-0	FC Ryukyu	Tochigi Green Stadium	4,812
2	2017.03.18	FC Ryukyu	1-2	Grulla Morioka	Okinawa Athletic Park Stadium	4,438
3	2017.03.26	Fukushima United FC	1-0	FC Ryukyu	Toho Stadium	1,637
4	2017.04.01	FC Ryukyu	3-0	Gamba Osaka U-23	Okinawa Athletic Park Stadium	1,559
5	2017.04.16	Kataller Toyama	0-0	FC Ryukyu	Toyama Stadium	3,041
6	2017.04.30	FC Ryukyu	1-6	Blaublitz Akita	Okinawa Athletic Park Stadium	3,789
7	2017.05.06	FC Tokyo U-23	0-3	FC Ryukyu	Ajinomoto Field Nishigaoka	2,607
8	2017.05.13	FC Ryukyu	2-2	Azul Claro Numazu	Okinawa Athletic Park Stadium	1,365
9	2017.05.20	FC Ryukyu	1-1	SC Sagamihara	Okinawa Athletic Park Stadium	1,968
10	2017.05.28	Fujieda MYFC	1-2	FC Ryukyu	Fujieda Soccer Stadium	1,141
11	2017.06.03	Cerezo Osaka U-23	1-2	FC Ryukyu	Kincho Stadium	762
12	2017.06.10	FC Ryukyu	1-1	AC Nagano Parceiro	Okinawa Athletic Park Stadium	3,222
14	2017.06.25	FC Ryukyu	2-1	Gainare Tottori	Okinawa Athletic Park Stadium	1,813
15	2017.07.01	YSCC Yokohama	2-2	FC Ryukyu	NHK Spring Mitsuzawa Football Stadium	662
16	2017.07.08	Kagoshima United FC	0-1	FC Ryukyu	Kagoshima Kamoike Stadium	3,024
17	2017.07.15	FC Ryukyu	0-0	Giravanz Kitakyushu	Okinawa Athletic Park Stadium	3,180
18	2017.07.23	AC Nagano Parceiro	1-0	FC Ryukyu	Minami Nagano Sports Park Stadium	3,405
19	2017.08.19	FC Ryukyu	2-1	Fukushima United FC	Okinawa Athletic Park Stadium	6,888
20	2017.08.26	Giravanz Kitakyushu	2-0	FC Ryukyu	Mikuni World Stadium Kitakyushu	13,880
21	2017.09.04	Gamba Osaka U-23	1-7	FC Ryukyu	Suita City Football Stadium	597
22	2017.09.09	FC Ryukyu	2-2	Fujieda MYFC	Okinawa Athletic Park Stadium	1,382
23	2017.09.16	FC Ryukyu	0-1	Kagoshima United FC	Okinawa Athletic Park Stadium	1,083
24	2017.09.24	Blaublitz Akita	1-2	FC Ryukyu	Akigin Stadium	3,933
25	2017.09.30	FC Ryukyu	1-0	Cerezo Osaka U-23	Okinawa Athletic Park Stadium	2,321
26	2017.10.08	SC Sagamihara	4-2	FC Ryukyu	Sagamihara Gion Stadium	2,338
27	2017.10.15	Grulla Morioka	0-0	FC Ryukyu	Iwagin Stadium	2,112
28	2017.10.21	FC Ryukyu	1-1	FC Tokyo U-23	Okinawa Athletic Park Stadium	1,138
29	2017.10.29	Gainare Tottori	2-3	FC Ryukyu	Tottori Bank Bird Stadium	573
30	2017.11.05	FC Ryukyu	2-1	YSCC Yokohama	Okinawa Athletic Park Stadium	1,032
31	2017.11.11	FC Ryukyu	0-0	Tochigi SC	Okinawa Athletic Park Stadium	1,826
32	2017.11.19	Azul Claro Numazu	1-0	FC Ryukyu	Ashitaka Park Stadium	2,014
34	2017.12.03	FC Ryukyu	1-0	Kataller Toyama	Okinawa Athletic Park Stadium	3,128
