= 2016 FC Ryukyu season =

FC Ryukyu
2016 season
- Manager: Kim Jong-song
- Stadium: Okinawa Athletic Park Stadium
- J3 League: 8th
Home colours	Away colours

2016 FC Ryukyu season.

== Squad ==
As of 29 May 2016. Note: Flags indicate national team as defined under FIFA eligibility rules; some limited exceptions apply. Players may hold more than one non-FIFA nationality.

No.	Pos.	Nation	Player
1	GK	KOR	Park Iru-gyu
2	DF	JPN	Kosuke Masutani
3	MF	JPN	Kota Miyagi
4	MF	JPN	Yutaro Chinen
5	MF	BRA	Ruan
6	MF	JPN	Keisuke Tanabe
7	MF	JPN	Keita Tanaka
8	MF	JPN	Noritaka Fujisawa
9	FW	BRA	Pablo
10	MF	JPN	Yu Tomidokoro
11	FW	JPN	Ryuji Saito
13	DF	JPN	Katsuhiro Hamada

No.	Pos.	Nation	Player
14	MF	KOR	Park Ri-ki
15	FW	BRA	Leonardo
16	FW	JPN	Tatsuro Yamauchi
17	GK	JPN	Keisuke Tsumita
18	MF	JPN	Yuta Togashi
19	FW	JPN	Satoki Uejo
20	FW	JPN	Desheun Ryo Yamakawa
21	GK	JPN	Taisuke Konno
22	DF	JPN	Shuhei Takizawa
23	DF	JPN	Yukiya Tamashiro
24	MF	JPN	Kenichiro Hirata

== J3 League ==
=== League table ===
Pos	Team	Pld	W	D	L	GF	GA	GD	Pts
5	Kagoshima United	30	15	5	10	39	29	+10	50
6	Kataller Toyama	30	13	10	7	37	29	+8	49
7	Fujieda MYFC	30	14	3	13	48	42	+6	45
8	FC Ryukyu	30	12	8	10	46	46	0	44
9	Gamba Osaka U-23	30	10	8	12	42	41	+1	38
10	FC Tokyo U-23	30	9	9	12	32	31	+1	36
11	SC Sagamihara	30	9	8	13	29	46	−17	35

Updated to match(es) played on 20 November 2016. Source: 2016 MEIJI YASUDA J3 LEAGUE League table
Rules for classification: 1) Points; 2) Goal difference; 3) Goals scored; 4th) head-to-head results; 5th) disciplinary points; 6th) draw

=== Match details ===
J3 League match details
Match	Date	Team	Score	Team	Venue	Attendance
1	2016.03.13	FC Ryukyu	1-0	Fujieda MYFC	Okinawa Athletic Park Stadium	1,311
2	2016.03.20	FC Tokyo U-23	2-3	FC Ryukyu	Ajinomoto Field Nishigaoka	3,584
3	2016.04.02	Cerezo Osaka U-23	2-1	FC Ryukyu	Kincho Stadium	1,408
4	2016.04.10	FC Ryukyu	1-0	Oita Trinita	Okinawa Athletic Park Stadium	1,424
5	2016.04.17	Grulla Morioka	2-3	FC Ryukyu	Iwagin Stadium	486
6	2016.04.24	FC Ryukyu	2-2	Kataller Toyama	Okinawa Athletic Park Stadium	948
7	2016.05.01	FC Ryukyu	2-2	SC Sagamihara	Okinawa Athletic Park Stadium	1,382
8	2016.05.08	Gainare Tottori	1-0	FC Ryukyu	Tottori Bank Bird Stadium	1,385
9	2016.05.15	FC Ryukyu	1-0	Gamba Osaka U-23	Okinawa Athletic Park Stadium	1,251
10	2016.05.22	Fukushima United FC	1-1	FC Ryukyu	Toho Stadium	1,077
11	2016.05.29	FC Ryukyu	1-1	Blaublitz Akita	Okinawa Athletic Park Stadium	1,347
12	2016.06.12	AC Nagano Parceiro	2-0	FC Ryukyu	Minami Nagano Sports Park Stadium	3,986
13	2016.06.19	FC Ryukyu	0-1	YSCC Yokohama	Okinawa Athletic Park Stadium	1,554
14	2016.06.26	Tochigi SC	1-0	FC Ryukyu	Tochigi Green Stadium	4,824
15	2016.07.03	FC Ryukyu	3-1	Kagoshima United FC	Okinawa Athletic Park Stadium	1,357
16	2016.07.10	Oita Trinita	2-2	FC Ryukyu	Oita Bank Dome	7,051
17	2016.07.16	FC Ryukyu	1-5	FC Tokyo U-23	Okinawa Athletic Park Stadium	1,146
18	2016.07.24	Fujieda MYFC	4-2	FC Ryukyu	Fujieda Soccer Stadium	1,508
19	2016.07.31	FC Ryukyu	0-3	Cerezo Osaka U-23	Okinawa Athletic Park Stadium	4,565
20	2016.08.07	Gamba Osaka U-23	1-4	FC Ryukyu	Expo '70 Commemorative Stadium	1,066
21	2016.09.11	FC Ryukyu	2-3	Fukushima United FC	Okinawa Athletic Park Stadium	1,115
22	2016.09.19	FC Ryukyu	4-2	Grulla Morioka	Okinawa Athletic Park Stadium	1,150
23	2016.09.25	SC Sagamihara	1-3	FC Ryukyu	Sagamihara Gion Stadium	2,536
24	2016.10.02	FC Ryukyu	1-1	Tochigi SC	Okinawa Athletic Park Stadium	1,473
25	2016.10.16	YSCC Yokohama	0-2	FC Ryukyu	NHK Spring Mitsuzawa Football Stadium	824
26	2016.10.23	FC Ryukyu	2-1	AC Nagano Parceiro	Okinawa Athletic Park Stadium	1,354
27	2016.10.30	Kagoshima United FC	1-2	FC Ryukyu	Kagoshima Kamoike Stadium	4,919
28	2016.11.06	Kataller Toyama	1-1	FC Ryukyu	Toyama Stadium	2,691
29	2016.11.13	FC Ryukyu	1-1	Gainare Tottori	Okinawa Athletic Park Stadium	2,041
30	2016.11.20	Blaublitz Akita	2-0	FC Ryukyu	Akigin Stadium	2,198
