= 2018 FC Ryukyu season =

FC Ryukyu
2018 season
- Manager: Kim Jong-song
- Stadium: Tapic Kenso Hiyagon Stadium
- J3 League: 1st
Home colours	Away colours

2018 FC Ryukyu season.

== Squad ==
As of 10 February 2018. Note: Flags indicate national team as defined under FIFA eligibility rules; some limited exceptions apply. Players may hold more than one non-FIFA nationality.

No.	Pos.	Nation	Player
1	GK	PRK	Park Iru-gyu
2	DF	JPN	Kosuke Masutani
3	DF	JPN	Taishi Nishioka
4	MF	JPN	Yutaro Chinen
5	DF	JPN	Shuhei Tokumoto
6	MF	JPN	Masayoshi Takayanagi
7	MF	JPN	Park Ri-ki
8	MF	JPN	Hayata Komatsu
9	FW	JPN	Yuta Togashi
10	MF	JPN	Yu Tomidokoro
11	FW	JPN	Ryuji Bando
13	MF	JPN	Kazaki Nakagawa
14	FW	JPN	Satoki Uejo
15	MF	JPN	Tatsuya Mochizuki

No.	Pos.	Nation	Player
16	MF	JPN	Yuichiro Edamoto
17	GK	JPN	Keisuke Tsumita
18	DF	JPN	Yuki Miyauchi
19	MF	KOR	Choe Byeong-gil
20	FW	JPN	Aio Fukuda
21	GK	JPN	Keisuke Ono
22	DF	JPN	Shuhei Takizawa
23	DF	JPN	Daichi Okumiya
24	MF	JPN	Sho Otsuka
25	MF	KOR	Kim Song-sun
26	DF	JPN	Mikihito Arai
27	FW	NOR	Fadel Karbon

== J3 League ==
Match	Date	Team	Score	Team	Venue	Attendance
1	2018.03.11	FC Ryukyu	4-3	Kataller Toyama	Okinawa Athletic Park Stadium	4,815
2	2018.03.17	Giravanz Kitakyushu	1-2	FC Ryukyu	Mikuni World Stadium Kitakyushu	4,503
3	2018.03.21	FC Ryukyu	2-2	Gainare Tottori	Okinawa Athletic Park Stadium	2,331
4	2018.03.25	Thespakusatsu Gunma	0-2	FC Ryukyu	Shoda Shoyu Stadium Gunma	3,085
5	2018.04.01	Fukushima United FC	2-1	FC Ryukyu	Toho Stadium	1,249
6	2018.04.07	FC Ryukyu	1-1	Cerezo Osaka U-23	Okinawa Athletic Park Stadium	1,782
7	2018.04.14	Kagoshima United FC	2-1	FC Ryukyu	Shiranami Stadium	1,747
8	2018.04.29	YSCC Yokohama	3-2	FC Ryukyu	NHK Spring Mitsuzawa Football Stadium	1,285
9	2018.05.03	FC Ryukyu	2-1	Gamba Osaka U-23	Okinawa Athletic Park Stadium	1,824
10	2018.05.06	FC Ryukyu	0-0	Blaublitz Akita	Okinawa Athletic Park Stadium	1,791
12	2018.06.02	FC Ryukyu	2-0	AC Nagano Parceiro	Okinawa Athletic Park Stadium	2,473
13	2018.06.10	SC Sagamihara	2-5	FC Ryukyu	Sagamihara Gion Stadium	1,917
14	2018.06.16	FC Tokyo U-23	1-1	FC Ryukyu	Yumenoshima Stadium	2,074
15	2018.06.23	FC Ryukyu	1-0	Azul Claro Numazu	Okinawa Athletic Park Stadium	2,817
16	2018.07.01	Grulla Morioka	1-4	FC Ryukyu	Iwagin Stadium	925
17	2018.07.07	FC Ryukyu	3-0	Fujieda MYFC	Okinawa Athletic Park Stadium	7,289
18	2018.07.16	Blaublitz Akita	0-1	FC Ryukyu	Akigin Stadium	1,831
19	2018.07.21	FC Ryukyu	1-1	YSCC Yokohama	Okinawa Athletic Park Stadium	1,289
20	2018.08.25	FC Ryukyu	5-2	Grulla Morioka	Tapic Kenso Hiyagon Stadium	886
21	2018.09.02	Fujieda MYFC	0-1	FC Ryukyu	Fujieda Soccer Stadium	977
22	2018.09.08	FC Ryukyu	3-2	FC Tokyo U-23	Tapic Kenso Hiyagon Stadium	2,317
23	2018.09.15	Gamba Osaka U-23	2-0	FC Ryukyu	Panasonic Stadium Suita	804
24	2018.09.22	FC Ryukyu	4-0	Kagoshima United FC	Tapic Kenso Hiyagon Stadium	3,386
25	2018.09.30	Azul Claro Numazu	1-4	FC Ryukyu	Ashitaka Park Stadium	1,568
26	2018.10.06	FC Ryukyu	1-0	Giravanz Kitakyushu	Tapic Kenso Hiyagon Stadium	2,309
27	2018.10.13	FC Ryukyu	3-0	Fukushima United FC	Tapic Kenso Hiyagon Stadium	2,649
28	2018.10.20	Gainare Tottori	1-3	FC Ryukyu	Tottori Bank Bird Stadium	3,034
29	2018.10.28	AC Nagano Parceiro	1-1	FC Ryukyu	Nagano U Stadium	2,993
30	2018.11.03	FC Ryukyu	4-2	Thespakusatsu Gunma	Tapic Kenso Hiyagon Stadium	7,810
31	2018.11.11	Cerezo Osaka U-23	6-0	FC Ryukyu	Yanmar Stadium Nagai	1,012
33	2018.11.23	FC Ryukyu	5-1	SC Sagamihara	Tapic Kenso Hiyagon Stadium	4,562
34	2018.12.02	Kataller Toyama	2-1	FC Ryukyu	Toyama Stadium	4,124
