= 2019 FC Ryukyu season =

FC Ryukyu
2019 season
- Manager: Yasuhiro Higuchi
- Stadium: Tapic Kenso Hiyagon Stadium
Home colours	Away colours

The 2019 FC Ryukyu season was the club's first season in the J2 League after winning promotion in the 2018 J3 League.

== Competitions ==
=== J2 League ===
==== League table ====
Pos	Team	Pld	W	D	L	GF	GA	GD	Pts
13	Tokyo Verdy	42	14	13	15	59	59	0	55
14	FC Ryukyu	42	13	10	19	57	80	−23	49
15	Renofa Yamaguchi	42	13	8	21	54	70	−16	47

Source: Meiji Yasuda J2 League
Rules for classification: 1) Points; 2) Goal difference; 3) Goals scored

==== Results ====
24 February 2019 1	Ryukyu	3–1	Avispa Fukuoka	Okinawa
16:03 JST	Suzuki 23', 72' (pen.); Tomidokoro 82'; Uesato (yellow card) 20'; Ochi (yellow card) 80'	Report	Matsuda 36'; Wako (yellow card) 71'; Morimoto (yellow card) 78'	Stadium: Tapic Kenso Hiyagon Stadium; Attendance: 7385

2 March 2019 2	Omiya Ardija	3-4	Ryukyu	Saitama
14:00 JST	Juanma Delgado 19'; Tomiyama 87' (pen.); Watabe 90+1'	Report	Tanaka 16'; Suzuki 56', 58'; Uejo 61'	Stadium: NACK5 Stadium Omiya; Attendance: 7867

10 March 2019 3	Ryukyu	2-0	Ehime	Okinawa
16:00 JST	Uejo 10'; Suzuki 75'	Report		Stadium: Tapic Kenso Hiyagon Stadium; Attendance: 2428

16 March 2019 4	Ryukyu	2-1	Tokushima	Okinawa
18:00 JST	Uejo 37'; Nishioka 75'	Report	Kohei Uchida 48'	Stadium: Tapic Kenso Hiyagon Stadium; Attendance: 3460

24 March 2019 5	Yamagata	1-1	Ryukyu	Tendō
14:00 JST	Kunamoto 88'	Report	Suzuki 64'	Stadium: ND Soft Stadium Yamagata; Attendance: 6411

30 March 2019 6	Ryukyu	2-2	Yamaguchi	Okinawa
18:00 JST	Suzuki 64', 89'	Report	Kudo 56'; Sasaki 58'	Stadium: Tapic Kenso Hiyagon Stadium; Attendance: 3789

3 April 2019 7	Chiba	1-0	Ryukyu	Chiba
19:00 JST	Sato {{goal|34}]	Report		Stadium: Fukuda Denshi Arena; Attendance: 8313

7 April 2019 8	Ryukyu	1-1	Kashiwa	Okinawa
16:00 JST	Uejo 82'	Report	Gabriel 3'	Stadium: Tapic Kenso Hiyagon Stadium; Attendance: 7913

13 April 2019 9	Tokyo-V	1–1	Ryukyu	Chofu
14:00 JST	Watanabe 39'	Report	Carvajal (yellow card) 68'; Uesato 90+5'; Okazaki (yellow card) 90+8'	Stadium: Ajinomoto Stadium; Attendance: 4,847; Referee: (Japan) Hayato Shimizu

21 April 2019 10	Kagoshima	1–0	Ryukyu	Kagoshima
13:00 JST	Tsutsumi (yellow card) 84'; Goryo 90+2'	Report	Masutani (yellow card) 48'; Uejo (yellow card) 83'; Fukui (yellow card) 90+4'	Stadium: Shiranami Stadium; Attendance: 4,521; Referee: (Japan) Toshihiro Nakai

27 April 2019 11	Ryukyu	1–1	Machida	Okinawa
19:30 JST	Masutani 3'; Fukui (yellow card) 52'	Report	Romero 83'; Fukatsu (yellow card) 89'	Stadium: Tapic Kenso Hiyagon Stadium; Attendance: 4,855; Referee: (Japan) Takao Nishiyama

5 May 2019 12	Gifu	2–1	Ryukyu	Gifu
18:00 JST	Maeda 76'; Nagashima 85'; Aihara (yellow card) 90+2'	Report	Uesato 13'; Suzuki (yellow card) 90'	Stadium: Gifu Nagaragawa Stadium; Attendance: 6,692; Referee: (Japan) Hiromichi Oka

11 May 2019 13	Ryukyu	1-0	Mito	Okinawa
18:00 JST	Suzuki 8'	Report		Stadium: Tapic Kenso Hiyagon Stadium; Attendance: 3908

19 May 2019 14	Okayama	1-0	Ryukyu	Okayama
17:00 JST	Lee 54'	Report		Stadium: City Light Stadium; Attendance: 7,196

25 May 2019 15	Ryukyu	2-1	Niigata	Okinawa
19:30 JST	Tomidokoro 11'; Uehara 86'	Report	Leonardo 83'	Stadium: Tapic Kenso Hiyagon Stadium; Attendance: 5,107

2 June 2019 16	Yokohama	2-1	Ryukyu	Yokohama
14:00 JST	Ibba 78', 81'	Report	Suzuki 67'	Stadium: NHK Spring Mitsuzawa Football Stadium; Attendance: 4,433

8 June 2019 17	Ryukyu	1-1	Kanazawa	Okinawa
19:30 JST	Suzuki 69'	Report	Kato 6'	Stadium: Tapic Kenso Hiyagon Stadium; Attendance: 3,403

15 June 2019 18	Kyoto	2-2	Ryukyu	Kyoto
19:00 JST	Koyamatsu 36'; Ichimi 65'	Report	Suzuki 45+3'; Kawai 80'	Stadium: Kyoto Nishikyogoku Athletic Stadium; Attendance: 4,533

22 June 2019 19	Ryukyu	2-5	Kofu	Okinawa
18:00 JST	KAZAMA 23'; OCHI 37'	Report	SATO 44'; YOKOTANI 47'; UTAKA 53'; MORI 60'; UCHIDA 90+6'	Stadium: Tapic Kenso Hiyagon Stadium; Attendance: 3,952

29 June 2019 20	Nagasaki	3-2	Ryukyu	Isahaya
18:00 JST	TOKUNAGA 30'; OTAKE 65'; SAWADA 70'	Report	Suzuki 82'; Uejo 90+1'	Stadium: transcosmos Stadium Nagasaki; Attendance: 6,619

6 July 2019 21	Ryukyu	3-0	Tochigi	Okinawa
19:00 JST	Suzuki 19'; NISHIOKA 40'; OCHI 73'	Report		Stadium: Tapic Kenso Hiyagon Stadium; Attendance: 3,082

13 July 2019 22	Ryukyu	0-2	Okayama	Okinawa
19:00 JST		Report	LEE 2' (69)	Stadium: Tapic Kenso Hiyagon Stadium; Attendance: 4,063

21 July 2019 23	Mito	3-1	Ryukyu	Mito
18:00 JST	KUROKAWA 22'; SHICHI 43'; OGAWA 74'	Report	MASUTANI 56'	Stadium: K's denki Stadium Mito; Attendance: 4,432

27 July 2019 24	Niigata	4-0	Ryukyu	Niigata
19:00 JST	FRANCIS 44', 47', 90+1'	Report	Masutani 7' (o.g)	Stadium: Denka Big Swan Stadium; Attendance: 14,088

31 July 2019 25	Ryukyu	0-2	Chiba	Okinawa
19:00 JST		Report	KLEBER 43', 62'	Stadium: Tapic Kenso Hiyagon Stadium; Attendance: 3,705

4 August 2019 26	Kashiwa	5-1	Ryukyu	Kashiwa
19:00 JST	SEGAWA 39'; KOGA 42'; ESAKA 53', 90'; CRISTIANO 57'	Report	Suzuki 31'	Stadium: Sankyo Frontier Kashiwa Stadium; Attendance: 8,441

10 August 2019 27	Ryukyu	3-2	Nagasaki	Okinawa
19:00 JST	KAZAMA 19'; Satoki UEJO 85'; WADA 90+7'	Report	GOYA 15', 74'	Stadium: Tapic Kenso Hiyagon Stadium; Attendance: 2,677

17 August 2019 28	Ryukyu	1-3	Yokohama	Okinawa
19:00 JST	UEJO 19'	Report	SAITO 10'; MASTUO 22'; NAKAYAMA 45+1'	Stadium: Tapic Kenso Hiyagon Stadium; Attendance: 12,019

24 August 2019 29	Tokushima	6-1	Ryukyu	Naruto
19:00 JST	BUIJS; KAWATA 76', 81', 83'; OSHITANI 87'	Report	UEJO 35'; Okazaki 72' (o.g)	Stadium: POCARI SWEAT Stadium; Attendance: 4,567

31 August 2019 30	Ryukyu	1-2	Gifu	Okinawa
19:03 JST	Kawanishi 11', 41'		Kamisato 78'	Stadium: Tapic Kenso Hiyagon Stadium; Attendance: 6,163; Referee: Futoshi Nakamura

7 September 2019 31	Ryukyu	2-1	Kagoshima	Okinawa
19:00 JST				Stadium: Tapic Kenso Hiyagon Stadium

14 September 2019 32	Kanazawa	2-2	Ryukyu	Naruto
				Stadium: Ishikawa Athletics Stadium

21 September 2019 33	Ryukyu	3-3	Yamagata	Okinawa
				Stadium: Tapic Kenso Hiyagon Stadium

29 September 2019 34	Machida	0-0	Ryukyu	Machida
				Stadium: Machida Stadium

5 October 2019 35	Fukuoka	0-1	Ryukyu	Fukuoka
				Stadium: Hakatanomori Athletic Stadium

12 October 2019 36	Ryukyu	1-5	Tokyo-V	Okinawa
				Stadium: Tapic Kenso Hiyagon Stadium

20 October 2019 37	Tochigi	0-2	Ryukyu	Utsunomiya
				Stadium: Tochigi Green Stadium

27 October 2019 38	Ryukyu	2-3	Omiya	Okinawa
				Stadium: Tapic Kenso Hiyagon Stadium

3 November 2019 39	Yamaguchi	1-2	Ryukyu	Yamaguchi
				Stadium: Ishin Me-Life Stadium

10 November 2019 40	Ryukyu	0-3	Kyoto	Okinawa
				Stadium: Tapic Kenso Hiyagon Stadium

16 November 2019 41	Ehime	1-2	Ryukyu	Matsuyama
				Stadium: Ningineer Stadium

24 November 2019 42	Kofu	2-0	Ryukyu	Kōfu
				Stadium: Yamanashi Chuo Bank Stadium

== Squad statistics ==
No.	Pos.	Name	Apps	Goals	Discipline		
No.	Pos.	Name	Apps	Goals	Yellow card	Yellow card Red card	Red card
1	GK	(Costa Rica) Danny Carvajal	3	0	1	0	0
2	DF	(Japan) Kosuke Masutani	2	0	0	0	0
3	DF	(Japan) Taishi Nishioka	3	0	1	0	0
4	DF	(Japan) Ryohei Okazaki	3	0	0	0	0
5	DF	(Japan) Shuhei Tokumoto	3	0	0	0	0
6	MF	(Japan) Koki Kazama	3	0	0	0	0
7	MF	(Japan) Kazaki Nakagawa	3	0	0	0	0
8	MF	(Japan) Hayata Komatsu	0(2)	0	0	0	0
9	FW	(Japan) Koji Suzuki	3	5	0	0	0
10	MF	(Japan) Yu Tomidokoro	1	1	0	0	0
11	MF	(Japan) Keita Tanaka	3	1	0	0	0
16	DF	(Japan) Jumpei Arai	0(1)	0	0	0	0
19	MF	(Japan) Ryosuke Ochi	0(3)	0	1	0	0
20	MF	(Japan) Kazumasa Uesato	3	0	1	0	0
30	DF	(Japan) Shogo Nishikawa	0(1)	0	0	0	0
33	DF	(Japan) Ryoji Fukui	1(1)	0	0	0	0
13	MF	(Japan) Shuto Kawai	0(1)	0	0	0	0
13	MF	(Japan) Satoki Uejo	2	2	0	0	0
