= 2024 Ehime FC season =

Ehime FC
2024 season
- Manager: Kiyotaka Ishimaru
- Stadium: Ningineer Stadium
- J2 League: 10th
- Emperor's Cup: Second round
- J.League Cup: Round 1
Home colours	Away colours
- All statistics correct as of 12:28, 3 April 2024 (UTC).

The 2024 Ehime FC season was the club's 54th season in existence and the first one back in the J2 League after a two-year absence. As well as the domestic league, they competed in the Emperor's Cup and the J.League Cup.

== Squad ==
=== Season squad ===
Squad no.	Name	Nationality	Date of birth (age at start of season)
Goalkeepers
1	Kenta Tokushige	(Japan)	9 March 1984 (aged 39)
36	Shugo Tsuji	(Japan)	26 July 1991 (aged 32)
45	Kazuma Makiguchi	(Japan)	8 September 2004 (aged 19)
49	Raihei Kurokawa	(Japan)	7 June 2003 (aged 20)
Defenders
2	Ryota Moriwaki	(Japan)	6 April 1986 (aged 37)
4	Tatsuya Yamaguchi	(Japan)	9 February 2000 (aged 24)
5	Takanori Maeno	(Japan)	14 April 1988 (aged 35)
16	Shuma Mihara	(Japan)	16 July 2001 (aged 22)
19	Yusei Ozaki	(Japan)	26 July 2003 (aged 20)
20	Kang Sung-chan	(South Korea)	19 November 2005 (aged 18)
21	Bak Keon-woo	(South Korea)	9 August 2001 (aged 22)
23	Yu Ye-chan	(South Korea)	9 May 2001 (aged 22)
33	Sora Ogawa (c)	(Japan)	18 October 1999 (aged 24)
37	Reiya Morishita	(Japan)	1 November 1998 (aged 25)
Midfielders
6	Masashi Tanioka	(Japan)	14 July 2001 (aged 22)
7	Yutaka Soneda	(Japan)	29 August 1994 (aged 29)
8	Yuta Fukazawa	(Japan)	15 August 2000 (aged 23)
13	Ryo Kubota	(Japan)	5 January 2001 (aged 23)
14	Shunsuke Tanimoto	(Japan)	7 March 2001 (aged 22)
17	Shunsuke Motegi	(Japan)	2 October 1996 (aged 27)
18	Shunsuke Kikuchi	(Japan)	4 October 1991 (aged 32)
22	Nelson Ishiwatari	(Japan)	10 May 2005 (aged 18)
24	Ryo Sato	(Japan)	24 September 1997 (aged 26)
25	Taiga Ishiura	(Japan)	22 November 2001 (aged 22)
28	Akira Hamashita	(Japan)	5 July 1995 (aged 28)
Forwards
9	Ben Duncan	(Australia)	12 November 2002 (aged 21)
10	Riki Matsuda	(Japan)	24 July 1991 (aged 32)
11	Yuta Fujihara	(Japan)	9 April 1999 (aged 24)
26	Kyota Funahashi	(Japan)	31 July 2005 (aged 18)
40	Kazuki Sota	(Japan)	9 January 2000 (aged 24)

Last updated: 29 January 2024.
Source: Ehime FC website

== Transfers ==
=== Arrivals ===
Date	Position	Player	From	Type	Source
30 August 2023	MF	(Japan) Masashi Tanioka	(Japan) Kansai University	Full	
21 September 2023	FW	(Japan) Kyota Funahashi	(Japan) Júbilo Iwata U-18s	Full	
17 November 2023	DF	(South Korea) Kang Sung-chang	(South Korea) Seohae High School	Full	
18 December 2023	MF	(Japan) Nelson Ishiwatari	(Japan) Cerezo Osaka	Loan	
22 December 2023	DF	(South Korea) Bak Keon-woo	(South Korea) Pohang Steelers	Full	
25 December 2023	DF	(South Korea) Yu Ye-chan	(South Korea) Jeonbuk Hyundai Motors	Full	
27 December 2023	FW	(Japan) Yuta Fujiwara	(Japan) Sagan Tosu	Full	
28 December 2023	MF	(Japan) Taiga Ishiura	(Japan) Tokyo Verdy	Full	
6 January 2024	MF	(Japan) Ryo Kubota	(Japan) FC Gifu	Full	
6 January 2024	MF	(Japan) Akira Hamashita	(Japan) Tokushima Vortis	Loan	
7 January 2024	DF	(Japan) Yusei Ozaki	(Japan) Vissel Kobe	Loan	

=== Departures ===
Date	Position	Player	To	Type	Source
29 November 2023	DF	(Japan) Shoi Yoshinaga	(Japan) Omiya Ardija	Loan return	
5 December 2023	DF	(Japan) Yasuhiro Hiraoka		Retired	
14 December 2023	MF	(Japan) Kyoji Kutsuna	(Japan) AC Nagano Parceiro	Full	
19 December 2023	MF	(Japan) Takumi Sasaki		Released	
20 December 2023	DF	(Japan) Kei Oshiro	(Japan) Gainare Tottori	Full	
20 December 2023	MF	(Japan) Asahi Yada	(Japan) Giravanz Kitakyushu	Full	
26 December 2023	FW	(Japan) Shumpei Fukahori	(Japan) Thespa Gunma	Loan return	
28 December 2023	MF	(Japan) Takuto Kimura	(Japan) Yokohama F. Marinos	Loan return	
29 December 2023	MF	(Japan) Yuto Hikida	(Japan) Fagiano Okayama	Loan return	
9 January 2024	FW	(Japan) Yugo Masukake	(Japan) Kashiwa Reysol	Loan return	
12 January 2024	DF	(Japan) Haruki Yoshida	(Japan) Edo All United	Full	
22 January 2024	MF	(Japan) Shuya Iwai	(Japan) Aventura Kawaguchi	Full	
12 March 2024	MF	(Japan) Takumi Sasaki	(Malaysia) Negeri Sembilan	Full	

== Pre-season matches ==
31 January 2024 Friendly	Ehime FC	0–0	Blaublitz Akita	Haruno
		Report		Stadium: Kochi Haruno Athletic Stadium
Note: 35 minutes

31 January 2024 Friendly	Ehime FC	1–0	Blaublitz Akita	Haruno
		Report		Stadium: Kochi Haruno Athletic Stadium
Note: 35 minutes

31 January 2024 Friendly	Ehime FC	0–1	Blaublitz Akita	Haruno
		Report		Stadium: Kochi Haruno Athletic Stadium
Note: 35 minutes

4 February 2024 Friendly	Ehime FC	0–0	Kamatamare Sanuki	Ningineer Stadium
		Report
Note: 45 minutes

4 February 2024 Friendly	Ehime FC	2–0	Kamatamare Sanuki	Ningineer Stadium
		Report
Note: 45 minutes

4 February 2024 Friendly	Ehime FC	1–1	Kamatamare Sanuki	Ningineer Stadium
		Report
Note: 45 minutes

== Competitions ==
=== Overall record ===
Competition	First match	Last match	Starting round	Final position	Record							
Competition	First match	Last match	Starting round	Final position	Pld	W	D	L	GF	GA	GD	Win %
J2 League	25 February 2024		Matchday 1		15	5	6	4	20	18	+2	33.33
Emperor's Cup					0	0	0	0	0	0	+0	—
J.League Cup	6 March 2024		Round 1	Round 1	1	0	0	1	3	4	−1	0.00
Total					16	5	6	5	23	22	+1	31.25

Last updated: 12 May 2024
Source: Competitions

=== J2 League ===
==== Table ====
Pos	Team	Pld	W	D	L	GF	GA	GD	Pts	Promotion or relegation
15	Mito HollyHock	38	11	11	16	39	51	−12	44	
16	Oita Trinita	38	10	13	15	33	47	−14	43	
17	Ehime FC	38	10	10	18	41	69	−28	40	
18	Tochigi SC (R)	38	7	13	18	33	57	−24	34	Relegation to the 2025 J3 League
19	Kagoshima United (R)	38	7	9	22	35	59	−24	30	Relegation to the 2025 J3 League

Source: Meiji Yasuda J2 League, J.League Data Site
Rules for classification: 1) Points; 2) Goal difference; 3) Goals scored; 4) Head-to-head points; 5) Head-to-head goal difference; 6) Head-to-head goal scored; 7) Fair-play points.
(R) Relegated

==== Results summary ====
Overall								Home						Away					
Pld	W	D	L	GF	GA	GD	Pts	W	D	L	GF	GA	GD	W	D	L	GF	GA	GD
24	9	7	8	29	36	−7	34	5	4	3	17	14	+3	4	3	5	12	22	−10

Last updated: 25 July 2024.
Source: Worldfootball

==== Results by round ====
Round	1	2	3	4	5	6	7	8	9	10	11	12	13	14	15	16	17	18	19	20	21	22	23	24	25	26	27	28	29	30	31	32	33	34	35	36	37	38
Ground	H	A	H	A	H	A	H	A	H	H	A	H	A	H	A	A	H	A	H	H	A	A	H	A	H	A	H	A	A	H								
Result	W	L	L	W	L	D	W	W	D	D	L	W	D	D	D	L	D	L	W	W	W	L	L	W														
Position	5	10	15	10	14	14	8	6	7	9	11	8	7	10	10	12	12	13	10	9	9	9	9	9														

Updated to match(es) played on 12 May 2024. Source: Worldfootball
A = Away; H = Home; W = Win; D = Draw; L = Loss

==== Matches ====
The full league fixtures were released on 23 January 2024.

25 February 1	Ehime FC	1–0	Blaublitz Akita	Matsuyama
12:53 UTC+9	Kubota 29'	Report		Stadium: Ningineer Stadium; Attendance: 5,193; Referee: Yusuke Ohashi

2 March 2	Shimizu S-Pulse	2–0	Ehime FC	Shizuoka
14:03 UTC+9	Kitagawa 58', 89'	Report		Stadium: IAI Stadium Nihondaira; Attendance: 15,758; Referee: Tetsuro Yoshida

10 March 3	Ehime FC	2–3	Roasso Kumamoto	Matsuyama
15:03 UTC+9	Tanimoto 38'; Kikuchi 87'	Report	Konagaya 12', 73'; Onishi 90+1'	Stadium: Ningineer Stadium; Attendance: 3,214; Referee: Genki Tawara

16 March 4	Thespa Gunma	0–1	Ehime FC	Maebashi
14:03 UTC+9	Amagasa (yellow card) 26' (yellow-red card) 61'	Report	Fukazawa 17'; Morishita (yellow card) 51' (yellow-red card) 85'	Stadium: Shoda Shoyu Stadium Gunma; Attendance: 2,434; Referee: Shuhei Shimizu

20 March 5	Ehime FC	1–2	V-Varen Nagasaki	Matsuyama
15:03 UTC+9	Duncan 75'	Report	Matheus Jesus 27'; Juanma 71'	Stadium: Ningineer Stadium; Attendance: 3,214; Referee: Hayato Shimizu

24 March 6	Renofa Yamaguchi	1–1	Ehime FC	Yamaguchi
14:03 UTC+9	Hirase 90'	Report	Bak K.W. 39'	Stadium: Ishin Me-Life Stadium; Attendance: 3,244; Referee: Futoshi Nakamura

30 March 7	Ehime FC	3–0	Fujieda MYFC	Matsuyama
16:03 UTC+9	Motegi 47'; Matsuda 72'; Kikuchi 88'	Report		Stadium: Ningineer Stadium; Attendance: 2,853; Referee: Yuzo Sutani

3 April 8	Vegalta Sendai	1–2	Ehime FC	Sendai
19:03 UTC+9	Nakajima 40'	Report	Tanimoto 67'; Ishiura 79'	Stadium: Yurtec Stadium Sendai; Attendance: 7,841; Referee: Tomohiro Inoue

7 April 9	Ehime FC	2–2	Fagiano Okayama	Matsuyama
15:03 UTC+9	Matsuda 12'; Ogawa 70'; Bak K.W. (red card) 72'	Report	Fukazawa 68' (o.g.); Saito 90+2'	Stadium: Ningineer Stadium; Attendance: 5,313; Referee: Yoshiro Imamura

13 April 10	Ehime FC	2–2	Kagoshima United	Matsuyama
16:03 UTC+9	Ishiura 25'; Matsuda 49'	Report	Nakahara (red card) 45+3'; Endo 60'; Nodake 90+7'	Stadium: Ningineer Stadium; Attendance: 3,216; Referee: Shuhei Ishimaru

20 April 11	Montedio Yamagata	2–1	Ehime FC	Tendō
14:03 UTC+9	Issaka 23'; Sugiyama 68'	Report	Duncan 90+3'	Stadium: ND Soft Stadium Yamagata; Attendance: 6,286; Referee: Yoshikazu Matsuzawa

27 April 12	Ehime FC	2–1	Ventforet Kofu	Matsuyama
14:58 UTC+9	Ogawa 45+3'; Ishiura 47'	Report	Sekiguchi 13'	Stadium: Ningineer Stadium; Attendance: 3,776; Referee: Yuzo Sutani

3 May 13	Tokushima Vortis	0–0	Ehime FC	Naruto
13:13 UTC+9		Report		Stadium: Pocarisweat Stadium; Attendance: 12,227; Referee: Kazuyoshi Enomoto

6 May 14	Ehime FC	0–0	Iwaki FC	Matsuyama
15:03 UTC+9		Report		Stadium: Ningineer Stadium; Attendance: 2,929; Referee: Tetsuro Yoshida

12 May 15	Oita Trinita	2–2	Ehime FC	Ōita
14:03 UTC+9	Nagasawa 12'; Nomura 54'	Report	Duncan 80' (pen.); Morishita 83'	Stadium: Showa Denko Dome Oita; Attendance: 8,790; Referee: Genki Tawara

=== J.League Cup ===
6 March Round 1	Ehime FC	3–4 (a.e.t.)	V-Varen Nagasaki	Matsuyama
19:03 UTC+9	Duncan 23' (pen.); Funahashi 77'; Sato 82'; Bak Keon-woo (yellow card) 108' (yellow-red card) 115'	Report	Edigar Junio 2'; Matheus Jesus 32', 118'; Juanma 90+1' (pen.), (yellow card) 105+4'	Stadium: Ningineer Stadium; Attendance: 1,411; Referee: Reo Tanaka
