= 2018 Kagoshima United FC season =

Kagoshima United FC
2018 season
- Manager: Yasutoshi Miura
- Stadium: Shiranami Stadium
- J3 League: 2nd

2018 Kagoshima United FC season.

== J3 League ==
Match	Date	Team	Score	Team	Venue	Attendance
1	2018.03.11	Kagoshima United FC	0-2	Gainare Tottori	Kagoshima Kamoike Stadium	5,823
2	2018.03.17	Kagoshima United FC	4-1	Gamba Osaka U-23	Kagoshima Kamoike Stadium	2,223
3	2018.03.21	Fukushima United FC	0-0	Kagoshima United FC	Toho Stadium	671
4	2018.03.25	Kagoshima United FC	1-2	Fujieda MYFC	Kagoshima Kamoike Stadium	4,237
6	2018.04.07	Thespakusatsu Gunma	0-2	Kagoshima United FC	Shoda Shoyu Stadium Gunma	2,486
7	2018.04.14	Kagoshima United FC	2-1	FC Ryukyu	Shiranami Stadium	1,747
8	2018.04.28	Grulla Morioka	1-4	Kagoshima United FC	Iwagin Stadium	743
9	2018.05.03	Kagoshima United FC	2-2	AC Nagano Parceiro	Shiranami Stadium	4,094
10	2018.05.06	Kataller Toyama	0-2	Kagoshima United FC	Toyama Stadium	2,334
11	2018.05.19	Kagoshima United FC	2-1	SC Sagamihara	Shiranami Stadium	2,604
12	2018.06.03	FC Tokyo U-23	2-3	Kagoshima United FC	Ajinomoto Field Nishigaoka	2,563
13	2018.06.10	Azul Claro Numazu	0-0	Kagoshima United FC	Ashitaka Park Stadium	1,526
14	2018.06.16	Kagoshima United FC	2-1	Cerezo Osaka U-23	Shiranami Stadium	3,901
15	2018.06.24	Blaublitz Akita	1-1	Kagoshima United FC	Akigin Stadium	2,007
16	2018.07.01	Kagoshima United FC	1-1	YSCC Yokohama	Shiranami Stadium	4,030
18	2018.07.16	Gamba Osaka U-23	0-0	Kagoshima United FC	Panasonic Stadium Suita	1,054
19	2018.07.22	Kagoshima United FC	0-2	Thespakusatsu Gunma	Shiranami Stadium	4,108
17	2018.08.18	Giravanz Kitakyushu	0-0	Kagoshima United FC	Mikuni World Stadium Kitakyushu	4,341
20	2018.08.26	Cerezo Osaka U-23	1-2	Kagoshima United FC	Yanmar Stadium Nagai	684
21	2018.09.02	YSCC Yokohama	0-4	Kagoshima United FC	NHK Spring Mitsuzawa Football Stadium	1,122
22	2018.09.08	Kagoshima United FC	2-1	Fukushima United FC	Shiranami Stadium	2,124
23	2018.09.15	Kagoshima United FC	1-0	Giravanz Kitakyushu	Shiranami Stadium	5,216
24	2018.09.22	FC Ryukyu	4-0	Kagoshima United FC	Tapic Kenso Hiyagon Stadium	3,386
25	2018.09.29	Kagoshima United FC	2-2	Blaublitz Akita	Shiranami Stadium	1,703
26	2018.10.07	AC Nagano Parceiro	1-1	Kagoshima United FC	Nagano U Stadium	2,683
27	2018.10.14	Gainare Tottori	5-1	Kagoshima United FC	Tottori Bank Bird Stadium	2,401
28	2018.10.20	Kagoshima United FC	1-0	Grulla Morioka	Shiranami Stadium	3,824
29	2018.10.28	Kagoshima United FC	1-2	Kataller Toyama	Shiranami Stadium	5,078
31	2018.11.10	Kagoshima United FC	2-1	FC Tokyo U-23	Shiranami Stadium	3,014
32	2018.11.17	Fujieda MYFC	0-2	Kagoshima United FC	Fujieda Soccer Stadium	2,321
33	2018.11.25	Kagoshima United FC	1-0	Azul Claro Numazu	Shiranami Stadium	10,916
34	2018.12.02	SC Sagamihara	1-0	Kagoshima United FC	Sagamihara Gion Stadium	12,612
