= 2016 Kagoshima United FC season =

Kagoshima United FC
2016 season
- Manager: Kagoshima Kamoike Stadium
- Stadium: Tetsuya Asano
- J3 League: 5th

2016 Kagoshima United FC season.

== J3 League ==
=== League table ===
Pos	Team	Pld	W	D	L	GF	GA	GD	Pts	Qualification or relegation
2	Tochigi SC	30	17	8	5	38	20	+18	59	Qualification to J2 promotion playoffs (Note: Only teams that hold a J2 license are eligible for promotion.)
3	Nagano Parceiro	30	15	7	8	33	22	+11	52	
4	Blaublitz Akita	30	14	8	8	37	26	+11	50	
5	Kagoshima United	30	15	5	10	39	29	+10	50	
6	Kataller Toyama	30	13	10	7	37	29	+8	49	
7	Fujieda MYFC	30	14	3	13	48	42	+6	45	
8	FC Ryukyu	30	12	8	10	46	46	0	44	

Updated to match(es) played on 20 November 2016. Source: 2016 MEIJI YASUDA J3 LEAGUE League table
Rules for classification: 1) Points; 2) Goal difference; 3) Goals scored; 4th) head-to-head results; 5th) disciplinary points; 6th) draw

=== Match details ===
J3 League match details
Match	Date	Team	Score	Team	Venue	Attendance
1	2016.03.13	Kagoshima United FC	0-0	Kataller Toyama	Kagoshima Kamoike Stadium	4,452
2	2016.03.19	Kagoshima United FC	0-1	Oita Trinita	Kagoshima Kamoike Stadium	3,920
3	2016.04.03	YSCC Yokohama	0-1	Kagoshima United FC	NHK Spring Mitsuzawa Football Stadium	1,309
4	2016.04.10	Gainare Tottori	0-1	Kagoshima United FC	Tottori Bank Bird Stadium	1,653
6	2016.04.24	Tochigi SC	1-0	Kagoshima United FC	Tochigi Green Stadium	2,864
7	2016.05.01	Kagoshima United FC	1-0	Fukushima United FC	Kagoshima Kamoike Stadium	3,097
8	2016.05.08	Grulla Morioka	2-3	Kagoshima United FC	Iwagin Stadium	777
9	2016.05.15	Kagoshima United FC	3-1	Cerezo Osaka U-23	Kagoshima Kamoike Stadium	3,494
10	2016.05.22	FC Tokyo U-23	0-0	Kagoshima United FC	Yumenoshima Stadium	2,192
11	2016.05.29	Kagoshima United FC	3-1	Gamba Osaka U-23	Kagoshima Kamoike Stadium	2,024
12	2016.06.12	Blaublitz Akita	1-3	Kagoshima United FC	Akigin Stadium	3,681
13	2016.06.18	Kagoshima United FC	0-0	AC Nagano Parceiro	Kagoshima Kamoike Stadium	4,706
14	2016.06.26	Kagoshima United FC	1-0	Fujieda MYFC	Kagoshima Kamoike Stadium	3,262
15	2016.07.03	FC Ryukyu	3-1	Kagoshima United FC	Okinawa Athletic Park Stadium	1,357
16	2016.07.10	Fukushima United FC	1-2	Kagoshima United FC	Toho Stadium	1,554
17	2016.07.16	Kagoshima United FC	0-1	Tochigi SC	Kagoshima Kamoike Stadium	2,886
18	2016.07.24	Kataller Toyama	2-1	Kagoshima United FC	Toyama Stadium	2,976
19	2016.07.31	Kagoshima United FC	4-0	YSCC Yokohama	Kagoshima Kamoike Stadium	4,259
20	2016.08.06	Cerezo Osaka U-23	0-2	Kagoshima United FC	Kincho Stadium	1,085
5	2016.08.13	Kagoshima United FC	1-1	SC Sagamihara	Kagoshima Kamoike Stadium	3,202
21	2016.09.11	Kagoshima United FC	2-0	Gainare Tottori	Kagoshima Kamoike Stadium	3,667
22	2016.09.18	Gamba Osaka U-23	6-1	Kagoshima United FC	Suita City Football Stadium	2,655
23	2016.09.25	Kagoshima United FC	1-0	FC Tokyo U-23	Kagoshima Kamoike Stadium	3,723
24	2016.10.02	Oita Trinita	1-0	Kagoshima United FC	Oita Bank Dome	8,426
25	2016.10.16	Kagoshima United FC	1-0	Blaublitz Akita	Kagoshima Kamoike Stadium	2,393
26	2016.10.23	SC Sagamihara	0-4	Kagoshima United FC	Sagamihara Gion Stadium	4,312
27	2016.10.30	Kagoshima United FC	1-2	FC Ryukyu	Kagoshima Kamoike Stadium	4,919
28	2016.11.06	Fujieda MYFC	2-0	Kagoshima United FC	Fujieda Soccer Stadium	1,281
29	2016.11.13	Kagoshima United FC	2-2	Grulla Morioka	Kagoshima Kamoike Stadium	4,975
30	2016.11.20	AC Nagano Parceiro	1-0	Kagoshima United FC	Minami Nagano Sports Park Stadium	5,110
