= Kazumasa Uesato =

Japanese footballer

Kazumasa Uesato 上里 一将
Personal information
- Full name: Kazumasa Uesato
- Date of birth: March 13, 1986 (age 40)
- Place of birth: Miyakojima, Okinawa, Japan
- Height: 1.72 m (5 ft 7 1/2 in)
- Position: Midfielder

Team information
- Current team: Seriole Okinawa
- Number: 20

Youth career
- 2001–2003: Miyako High School

Senior career*
| Years | Team | Apps | (Gls) |
| 2004–2016 | Hokkaido Consadole Sapporo | 258 | (19) |
| 2011 | → FC Tokyo (loan) | 17 | (1) |
| 2012 | → Tokushima Vortis (loan) | 32 | (0) |
| 2017–2018 | Roasso Kumamoto | 44 | (2) |
| 2019–2022 | FC Ryukyu | 137 | (9) |
| 2023– | Seriole Okinawa | | |
Medal record
FC Tokyo
| Winner | Emperor's Cup | 2011 |
- * Club domestic league appearances and goals as of 1 October 2022

Kazumasa Uesato (上里 一将, Uesato Kazumasa; born March 13, 1986) is a Japanese football player who plays for Seriole Okinawa.

== Club statistics ==
Updated to 23 February 2018.

Appearances and goals by club, season and competition
| Club | Season | League | | | Emperor's Cup | | J.League Cup | | Total | |
| Club | Season | Division | Apps | Goals | Apps | Goals | Apps | Goals | Apps | Goals |
|---|---|---|---|---|---|---|---|---|---|---|
| Consadole Sapporo | 2004 | J2 League | 17 | 0 | 4 | 1 | - | | 21 | 1 |
| Consadole Sapporo | 2005 | J2 League | 23 | 2 | 0 | 0 | - | | 23 | 2 |
| Consadole Sapporo | 2006 | J2 League | 22 | 1 | 3 | 0 | - | | 25 | 1 |
| Consadole Sapporo | 2007 | J2 League | 7 | 0 | 1 | 0 | - | | 8 | 0 |
| Consadole Sapporo | 2008 | J1 League | 12 | 0 | 1 | 0 | 1 | 0 | 14 | 0 |
| Consadole Sapporo | 2009 | J2 League | 48 | 6 | 1 | 0 | - | | 49 | 6 |
| Consadole Sapporo | 2010 | J2 League | 28 | 4 | 1 | 0 | - | | 29 | 4 |
| FC Tokyo | 2011 | J2 League | 17 | 1 | 0 | 0 | - | | 17 | 1 |
| Tokushima Vortis | 2012 | J2 League | 32 | 0 | 1 | 0 | - | | 33 | 0 |
| Consadole Sapporo | 2013 | J2 League | 30 | 1 | 0 | 0 | - | | 30 | 1 |
| Consadole Sapporo | 2014 | J2 League | 26 | 4 | 0 | 0 | - | | 0 | 0 |
| Consadole Sapporo | 2015 | J2 League | 27 | 1 | 1 | 0 | - | | 28 | 1 |
| Hokkaido Consadole Sapporo | 2016 | J2 League | 18 | 0 | 0 | 0 | - | | 18 | 0 |
| Roasso Kumamoto | 2017 | J2 League | 28 | 1 | 1 | 1 | - | | 29 | 2 |
| Career total | | | 335 | 21 | 14 | 2 | 1 | 0 | 350 | 23 |
