= Ben Duncan (soccer) =

Australian soccer player (born 2002)

Personal information
- Full name: Ben Edmund Duncan
- Date of birth: 12 November 2002 (age 23)
- Place of birth: Australia
- Height: 1.86 m (6 ft 1 in)
- Position: Centre-forward

Youth career
- Central Coast Mariners

Senior career*
Years	Team	Apps	(Gls)
2023–2025	Ehime	65	(10)
- * Club domestic league appearances and goals as of 1 December 2025

Ben Edmund Duncan (born 12 November 2002) is an Australian professional soccer player who plays as a centre-forward. He most recently played for the J3 League club Ehime FC.

== Club career ==
A product of the Central Coast Mariners organization, it was announced that Duncan had signed with Ehime FC of the J3 League on 22 March 2023. The following month, on 2 April, he made his J.League debut in a J3 League match against Tegevajaro Miyazaki in the 5th match of the J3 League, replacing Kazuki Sota at the start of the second half. On 29 April, he scored two goals, including his first in a J3 League match against FC Ryukyu in the eighth round. He continued to score goals, and although he stalled after the summer, he eventually scored a total of six goals in the season, contributing to Ehime FC's J3 championship and return to the J2 League.

On 27 December 2023, Duncan renewed his contract with Ehime for the 2024 season. He left the club upon the expiration of his contract on 10 December 2025.

== Honours ==
Ehime

- J3 League: 2023
