= Ryo Kubota (footballer, born 2001) =

Japanese footballer

Personal information
- Date of birth: 5 January 2001 (age 25)
- Place of birth: Matsudo, Chiba, Japan
- Height: 1.71 m (5 ft 7 in)
- Position: Midfielder

Team information
- Current team: Yokohama FC
- Number: 13

Youth career
- ST Fute
- 2017–2019: Seiritsu Gakuen High School

Senior career*
Years	Team	Apps	(Gls)
2019–2022	Zweigen Kanazawa	47	(1)
2021–2022	→ FC Gifu (loan)	42	(6)
2023–24	FC Gifu	84	(15)
2024-2025	Ehime FC	57	(5)
2025-	Yokohama FC	23	(1)
- * Club domestic league appearances and goals as of 14 August 2026

Ryo Kubota (窪田 稜, Kubota Ryō; born 5 January 2001) is a Japanese professional footballer who plays as a midfielder for Yokohama FC.
