= Kyoji Kutsuna =

Japanese footballer

Personal information
- Full name: Kyoji Kutsuna
- Date of birth: 20 August 1997 (age 29)
- Place of birth: Ehime, Japan
- Height: 1.64 m (5 ft 5 in)
- Position: Midfielder

Team information
- Current team: AC Nagano Parceiro
- Number: 17

Youth career
- –2016: Ehime FC

College career
Years	Team	Apps	(Gls)
2016–2019	Biwako Seikei Sport College		

Senior career*
Years	Team	Apps	(Gls)
2015–2016	Ehime FC	0	(0)
2019–2022	Ehime FC	94	(5)
2023–	AC Nagano Parceiro	73	(9)
- * Club domestic league appearances and goals as of 17 August 2026

Kyoji Kutsuna (忽那 喬司, Kutsuna Kyoji; born 20 August 1997) is a Japanese footballer currently playing as a midfielder for AC Nagano Parceiro.

== Club career ==
Nakagawa made his professional debut on 14 October 2015 in an Emperor's Cup game against Ventforet Kofu.

== Career statistics ==
=== Club ===
As of 10 November 2020.

Club	Season	League			National Cup		League Cup		Other		Total	
Club	Season	Division	Apps	Goals	Apps	Goals	Apps	Goals	Apps	Goals	Apps	Goals
Ehime	2015	J2 League	0	0	2 (Note: Appearance(s) in Emperor's Cup)	0	0	0	0	0	2	0
Ehime	2016	J2 League	0	0	0	0	0	0	0	0	0	0
Ehime	2019	J2 League	0	0	0	0	0	0	0	0	0	0
Ehime	2020	J2 League	18	2	0	0	0	0	0	0	18	2
Career total			18	2	2	0	0	0	0	0	20	2
