= Taiga Ishiura =

Japanese footballer

Taiga Ishiura 石浦 大雅
Personal information
- Date of birth: 22 November 2001 (age 24)
- Place of birth: Kanagawa, Japan
- Height: 1.69 m (5 ft 7 in)
- Position: Midfielder

Team information
- Current team: FC Ryukyu
- Number: 11

Youth career
- FC Toripletta Tsurukawa
- –2019: Tokyo Verdy

Senior career*
Years	Team	Apps	(Gls)
2019–2023	Tokyo Verdy	51	(1)
2023	→ Ehime FC (loan)	23	(5)
2024–2025	Ehime FC	37	(7)
2025–	FC Ryukyu	35	(3)
- * Club domestic league appearances and goals as of 25 August 2026

Taiga Ishiura (石浦 大雅, Ishiura Taiga; born 22 November 2001) is a Japanese professional footballer who plays as a midfielder for FC Ryukyu.

== Career statistics ==
As of 3 June 2024

Appearances and goals by club, season and competition
Club	Season	League			National Cup		League Cup		Other		Total	
Club	Season	Division	Apps	Goals	Apps	Goals	Apps	Goals	Apps	Goals	Apps	Goals
Japan			League		Emperor's Cup		J. League Cup		Other		Total	
Tokyo Verdy	2019	J2 League	1	0	0	0	–		–		1	0
Tokyo Verdy	2020	J2 League	3	0	0	0	–		–		3	0
Tokyo Verdy	2021	J2 League	27	0	1	0	–		–		28	0
Tokyo Verdy	2022	J2 League	20	1	2	0	–		–		22	1
Tokyo Verdy	Total		51	1	3	0	0	0	0	0	54	1
Ehime FC (loan)	2023	J3 League	23	5	0	0	–		–		23	5
Ehime FC	2024	J2 League	16	3	0	0	1	0	0	0	17	3
Career total			90	9	3	0	1	0	0	0	94	9
