= Keisuke Tanabe =

Japanese footballer (born 1992)

Keisuke Tanabe 田辺圭佑
Personal information
- Full name: Keisuke Tanabe
- Date of birth: 29 March 1992 (age 34)
- Place of birth: Sakado, Saitama, Japan
- Height: 1.70 m (5 ft 7 in)
- Position: Midfielder

Team information
- Current team: Roasso Kumamoto
- Number: 7

Youth career
- 2007–2009: Seiritsu Gakuen High School
- 2010–2013: Chuo University

Senior career*
Years	Team	Apps	(Gls)
2014–2017	FC Ryukyu	121	(5)
2018–2019	Roasso Kumamoto	22	(0)
2020–2021	Kagoshima United FC	52	(1)
2022–2023	Roasso Kumamoto	60	(2)
- * Club domestic league appearances and goals as of 23 July 2024

Keisuke Tanabe (田辺 圭佑, Tanabe Keisuke; born 29 March 1992) is a Japanese footballer who plays for Roasso Kumamoto.

== Club statistics ==
Updated to 23 July 2024.

Appearances and goals by club, season and competition
Club	Season	League			Emperor's Cup		Total	
Club	Season	Division	Apps	Goals	Apps	Goals	Apps	Goals
FC Ryukyu	2014	J3 League	30	0	1	0	31	0
FC Ryukyu	2015	J3 League	32	2	2	0	34	2
FC Ryukyu	2016	J3 League	27	2	2	1	29	3
FC Ryukyu	2017	J3 League	32	1	1	1	33	2
Roasso Kumamoto	2018	J2 League	6	0	1	0	7	0
Roasso Kumamoto	2019	J3 League	16	0	2	0	18	0
Kagoshima United	2020	J3 League	26	1	0	0	26	1
Kagoshima United	2021	J3 League	26	0	1	0	27	0
Roasso Kumamoto	2022	J2 League	32	2	2	0	34	2
Roasso Kumamoto	2023	J2 League	28	0	4	0	32	0
Career total			143	5	9	2	152	7
