= Sora Ogawa =

Japanese footballer (born 1999)

Sora Ogawa 小川 大空
Personal information
- Date of birth: 18 October 1999 (age 27)
- Place of birth: Osaka, Japan
- Height: 1.80 m (5 ft 11 in)
- Position: Defender

Team information
- Current team: Sagan Tosu
- Number: 32

Youth career
- Shimotsuike JSS
- –2014: Rip Ace SC
- 2015–2017: Hannan University High School

College career
Years	Team	Apps	(Gls)
2018–2022	Osaka University H&SS		

Senior career*
Years	Team	Apps	(Gls)
2021	→ Ehime FC (loan)	1	(0)
2022–2024	Ehime FC	87	(5)
2025–	Sagan Tosu	58	(0)
- * Club domestic league appearances and goals as of 14 August 2026

Sora Ogawa (小川 大空, Ogawa Sora; born 18 October 1999) is a Japanese footballer who plays as a defender for Sagan Tosu.

== Career statistics ==
=== Club ===
As of 26 September 2021.

Club	Season	League			National Cup		League Cup		Other		Total	
Club	Season	Division	Apps	Goals	Apps	Goals	Apps	Goals	Apps	Goals	Apps	Goals
Ehime FC	2021	J2 League	1	0	0	0	0	0	0	0	1	0
Career total			1	0	0	0	0	0	0	0	1	0

== Honours ==
Ehime FC

- J3 League: 2023

Individual

- J3 League Best XI: 2023
