= Shunsuke Motegi =

Japanese footballer (born 1996)

Shunsuke Motegi 茂木 駿佑
Personal information
- Full name: Shunsuke Motegi
- Date of birth: October 2, 1996 (age 30)
- Place of birth: Bunkyō, Japan
- Height: 1.68 m (5 ft 6 in)
- Position: Midfielder

Team information
- Current team: FC Ryukyu
- Number: 7

Youth career
- FC Brillo
- Kashiwa Reysol
- 2012–2014: Vegalta Sendai

Senior career*
Years	Team	Apps	(Gls)
2015–2018	Vegalta Sendai	27	(0)
2015	→ Zweigen Kanazawa (loan)	11	(0)
2015	→ J. League U-22 (loan)	1	(0)
2018	→ Mito HollyHock (loan)	24	(4)
2019	Mito HollyHock	28	(4)
2020–2021	FC Ryukyu	37	(4)
2022–2024	Ehime FC	98	(9)
2025–	FC Ryukyu	46	(1)
Medal record
Vegalta Sendai
Runner-up	Emperor's Cup	2018
- * Club domestic league appearances and goals as of 25 August 2026

Shunsuke Motegi (茂木 駿佑, Motegi Shunsuke; born October 2, 1996) is a Japanese footballer who plays as a midfielder for J3 League club FC Ryukyu.

== Playing career ==
Shunsuke Motegi joined to J1 League club; Vegalta Sendai in 2015. In July, he move to J2 League club; Zweigen Kanazawa. In 2016, he back to Vegalta Sendai.

== Club statistics ==
Updated to 14 April 2020.

Club performance			League		Cup		League Cup		Total	
Season	Club	League	Apps	Goals	Apps	Goals	Apps	Goals	Apps	Goals
Japan			League		Emperor's Cup		J. League Cup		Total	
2015	Vegalta Sendai	J1 League	11	0	–		6	0	17	0
2015	Zweigen Kanazawa	J2 League	11	0	2	1	–		13	1
2016	Vegalta Sendai	J1 League	8	0	1	1	1	0	10	1
2017	Vegalta Sendai	J1 League	8	0	0	0	4	0	12	0
2018	Vegalta Sendai	J1 League	0	0	0	0	6	3	6	3
2018	Mito HollyHock	J2 League	24	4	0	0	–		24	4
2019	Mito HollyHock	J2 League	28	4	0	0	–		28	4
Total			90	8	3	2	16	3	109	13

== Honours ==
Ehime FC

- J3 League: 2023

Individual

- J3 League Best XI: 2023
