= Taisuke Konno =

Japanese footballer

Personal information
- Full name: Taisuke Konno
- Date of birth: December 18, 1992 (age 33)
- Place of birth: Tokyo, Japan
- Height: 1.79 m (5 ft 10 1/2 in)
- Position: Goalkeeper

Team information
- Current team: FC Ryukyu
- Number: 21

Youth career
- 2011–2014: Tokyo International University

Senior career*
Years	Team	Apps	(Gls)
2015–	FC Ryukyu	33	(0)
- * Club domestic league appearances and goals as of 23 February 2016

Taisuke Konno (今野 太祐, Konno Taisuke; born December 18, 1992, in Tokyo) is a Japanese football player for FC Ryukyu.

== Club statistics ==
Updated to 23 February 2016.

Club performance			League		Cup		Total	
Season	Club	League	Apps	Goals	Apps	Goals	Apps	Goals
Japan			League		Emperor's Cup		Total	
2015	FC Ryukyu	J3 League	33	0	1	0	34	0
Career total			33	0	1	0	34	0
