= Bak Keon-woo =

South Korean footballer (born 2001)

Personal information
- Date of birth: 9 August 2001 (age 25)
- Place of birth: South Korea
- Height: 1.70 m (5 ft 7 in)
- Position: Right-back

Team information
- Current team: Chungbuk Cheongju FC
- Number: 8

Youth career
- 2012–2013: Kwangjang Elementary School
- 2014–2019: Pohang Steelers

College career
Years	Team	Apps	(Gls)
2019–2021	Korea University		

Senior career*
Years	Team	Apps	(Gls)
2022–2023	Pohang Steelers	2	(0)
2022	→ Sagan Tosu (loan)	2	(0)
2024–2025	Ehime FC	36	(2)
2025	→ Chungbuk Cheongju FC (loan)	9	(0)
2026–	Chungbuk Cheongju FC	16	(0)
- * Club domestic league appearances and goals as of 6 August 2026

- Bak Keon-woo
- Hangul: 박건우
- RR: Bak Geonu
- MR: Pak Kŏnu

Bak Keon-woo (Korean: 박건우; born 9 August 2001) is a South Korean footballer who currently plays as a right-back for J2 League club Chungbuk Cheongju FC.

== Club career ==
In July 2022, Bak was loaned to Japanese J1 League side Sagan Tosu on a five-month deal.

On 22 December 2022, Bak joined Japanese J2 League site Ehime FC.

On 13 June 2025, Bak was loaned to K League 2 club Chungbuk Cheongju FC until the end of the season.

== Career statistics ==
=== Club ===
As of matches played 5 November 2022

Appearances and goals by club, season and competition
Club	Season	League			National Cup		League Cup		Other		Total	
Club	Season	Division	Apps	Goals	Apps	Goals	Apps	Goals	Apps	Goals	Apps	Goals
Pohang Steelers	2022	K League 1	0	0	0	0	–		0	0	0	0
Sagan Tosu (loan)	2022	J1 League	2	0	0	0	0	0	0	0	2	0
Career total			2	0	0	0	0	0	0	0	2	0
