= Hayata Komatsu =

Japanese footballer

Hayata Komatsu 小松 駿太
Personal information
- Full name: Hayata Komatsu
- Date of birth: November 7, 1997 (age 28)
- Place of birth: Tokyo, Japan
- Height: 1.80 m (5 ft 11 in)
- Position: Midfielder

Team information
- Current team: Reilac Shiga FC

Youth career
- Yokohama F. Marinos
- 2013–2016: Juntendo University

Senior career*
Years	Team	Apps	(Gls)
2017	YSCC Yokohama	26	(3)
2018–2019	FC Ryukyu	48	(0)
2020–2023	Montedio Yamagata	21	(0)
2021-2022	FC Imabari	13	(1)
2021-2023	Iwate Grulla Morioka	31	(3)
2022-2023	Gyeongju KHNP FC	9	(0)
2023-2024	FC Osaka	17	(0)
2024-	Reilac Shiga FC	15	(1)
- * Club domestic league appearances and goals as of 24 August 2024 @ 16:02(AEST)

Hayata Komatsu (小松 駿太, Komatsu Hayata; born November 7, 1997) is a Japanese football player. He plays for FC Osaka.

== Career ==
Hayata Komatsu joined J3 League club YSCC Yokohama in 2017.

== Club statistics ==
Updated to 2 January 2020.

Club performance			League		Cup		Total	
Season	Club	League	Apps	Goals	Apps	Goals	Apps	Goals
Japan			League		Emperor's Cup		Total	
2017	YSCC Yokohama	J3 League	26	3	1	0	27	3
2018	FC Ryukyu	J3 League	31	0	1	0	32	0
2019	FC Ryukyu	J2 League	17	0	1	0	18	0
Total			74	3	3	0	77	3
