= Akira Hamashita =

Japanese footballer (born 1995)

Akira Hamashita 浜下 瑛
Personal information
- Full name: Akira Hamashita
- Date of birth: 5 July 1995 (age 31)
- Place of birth: Hiroshima, Japan
- Height: 1.81 m (5 ft 11 in)
- Position: Midfielder

Team information
- Current team: YSCC Yokohama
- Number: 37

Youth career
- Iguchi FC
- –2012: Sanfrecce Hiroshima
- 2011–2013: Setouchi High School

College career
Years	Team	Apps	(Gls)
2014–2017	Sanno Institute of Management		

Senior career*
Years	Team	Apps	(Gls)
2018–2019	Tochigi SC	63	(3)
2020–2024	Tokushima Vortis	76	(3)
2024	→ Ehime FC (loan)	11	(1)
2025–	YSCC Yokohama	0	(0)
- * Club domestic league appearances and goals as of 8 February 2025, 18:20 (UTC)

Akira Hamashita (浜下 瑛, Hamashita Akira; born 5 July 1995 in Mashiki, Kumamoto) is a Japanese footballer who play as a Midfielder and currently play for Japan Football League club, YSCC Yokohama.

== Early life ==
Akira was born in Hiroshima. He played for Iguchi FC, Sanfreece Hiroshima, Setouchi High School and Sanno Institute of Management during his youth.

== Career ==
After attending Sanno Institute of Management, Hamashita joined Tochigi SC in December 2017. He made his league debut for Tochigi against Fagiano Okayama on the 4 March 2018. He scored his first goal for the club against Albirex Niigata on the 11 August 2018, scoring in the 48th minute.

At the end of 2019, he signed with Tokushima Vortis. He made his league debut for Tokushima on the 23 February 2020. He scored his first goal for the club against Giravanz Kitakyushu on the 2 December 2020, scoring in the 90th+3rd minute. He was part of the team that won the 2020 J2 League.

On 13 January 2025, Hamashita was announce official transfer to JFL relegated club, YSCC Yokohama for 2025 season.

== Career statistics ==
=== Club ===
As of the start for 2025 season.

Club performance			League		Cup		League Cup		Total	
Season	Club	League	Apps	Goals	Apps	Goals	Apps	Goals	Apps	Goals
Japan			League		Emperor's Cup		J.League Cup		Total	
2018	Tochigi SC	J2 League	30	2	1	0	–		31	2
2019	Tochigi SC	J2 League	33	1	0	0	–		31	2
2020	Tokushima Vortis	J1 League	8	1	2	0	–		10	1
2021	Tokushima Vortis	J2 League	20	0	1	0	5	1	26	1
2022	Tokushima Vortis	J2 League	29	2	1	0	2	0	32	2
2023	Tokushima Vortis	J2 League	19	0	1	0	–		20	0
2024	Ehime FC (loan)	J2 League	11	1	2	2	1	0	14	3
2025	YSCC Yokohama	Japan Football League	0	0	0	0	–		0	0
Career total			150	7	8	2	8	1	166	10

== Honours ==
Tokushima Vortis

- J2 League: 2020
