= Yutaro Chinen =

Japanese football player (born 1993)

Personal information
- Full name: Yutaro Chinen
- Date of birth: November 19, 1993 (age 32)
- Place of birth: Okinawa, Japan
- Height: 1.74 m (5 ft 8 1/2 in)
- Position: Midfielder

Youth career
- 2009–2011: Kyoto Sanga Youth
- 2012–2015: Ritsumeikan University

Senior career*
Years	Team	Apps	(Gls)
2016–2018	FC Ryukyu	72	(1)
- * Club domestic league appearances and goals as of 5 January 2019

Yutaro Chinen (知念 雄太朗, Chinen Yūtarō; born November 19, 1993) is a Japanese football player.

== Career ==
Chinen left FC Ryukyu at the end of 2018.

== Club statistics ==
Updated to 20 February 2018.

Club performance			League		Cup		Total	
Season	Club	League	Apps	Goals	Apps	Goals	Apps	Goals
Japan			League		Emperor's Cup		Total	
2016	FC Ryukyu	J3 League	25	1	2	0	27	1
2017	FC Ryukyu	J3 League	29	0	1	0	30	0
Total			54	1	3	0	57	1
