= Taishi Nishioka =

Japanese footballer

Taishi Nishioka 西岡 大志
Personal information
- Full name: Taishi Nishioka
- Date of birth: July 28, 1994 (age 32)
- Place of birth: Miyazaki, Japan
- Height: 1.80 m (5 ft 11 in)
- Position: Right back

Team information
- Current team: Tegevajaro Miyazaki
- Number: 3

Youth career
- 2013–2016: Fukuoka University

Senior career*
Years	Team	Apps	(Gls)
2017–2019	FC Ryukyu	48	(4)
2020–2022	Ehime FC	65	(6)
2023-	Tegevajaro Miyazaki	24	(1)
Total		137	(11)
- * Club domestic league appearances and goals as of 17:17, 18 January 2024 (AEST)

Taishi Nishioka (西岡 大志, Nishioka Taishi; born July 28, 1994) is a Japanese football player. He plays for Tegevajaro Miyazaki.

== Career ==
Taishi Nishioka joined J3 League club FC Ryukyu in 2017.

== Club statistics ==
Updated to 22 February 2018.

Club performance			League		Cup		Total	
Season	Club	League	Apps	Goals	Apps	Goals	Apps	Goals
Japan			League		Emperor's Cup		Total	
2017	FC Ryukyu	J3 League	23	0	1	2	24	2
Total			23	0	1	2	24	2
