= Shuhei Takizawa =

Japanese footballer

Shuhei Takizawa 瀧澤 修平
Personal information
- Full name: Shuhei Takizawa
- Date of birth: July 19, 1993 (age 33)
- Place of birth: Ibaraki, Japan
- Height: 1.82 m (5 ft 11 1/2 in)
- Position: Defender

Youth career
- 2012–2015: Toyo University

Senior career*
Years	Team	Apps	(Gls)
2016–2018	FC Ryukyu	76	(1)
2019–2020	Mito HollyHock	20	(1)
2021	→ Montedio Yamagata (loan)	2	(0)
2022	Tegevajaro Miyazaki	8	(0)
2023	Joyful Honda Tsukuba FC		
Total		106	(2)
- * Club domestic league appearances and goals

Shuhei Takizawa (瀧澤 修平, Takizawa Shūhei; born July 19, 1993) is a Japanese former footballer who played as a defender.

== Career ==
Takizawa played for Toyo University before beginning his professional career at FC Ryukyu in 2016. He subsequently joined Mito HollyHock in 2019. He had a loan spell at Montedio Yamagata in 2021 before joining Tegevajaro Miyazaki in 2022.

He joined Joyful Honda Tsukuba FC in 2023 and played there for one season before announcing his retirement at the end of the season.

== Club statistics ==
Appearances and goals by club, season and competition
Club	Season	League			National cup (Note: Includes Emperors Cup)		Total	
Club	Season	Division	Apps	Goals	Apps	Goals	Apps	Goals
FC Ryukyu	2016	J3 League	25	1	2	0	27	1
FC Ryukyu	2017	J3 League	19	0	0	0	19	0
FC Ryukyu	2018	J3 League	32	0	1	0	33	0
FC Ryukyu	Total		76	1	3	0	79	1
Mito HollyHock	2019	J2 League	12	1	1	0	13	1
Mito HollyHock	2020	J2 League	8	0	0	0	8	0
Mito HollyHock	Total		20	1	1	0	21	1
Montedio Yamagata (loan)	2021	J2 League	2	0	1	0	3	0
Tegevajaro Miyazaki	2022	J3 League	8	0	0	0	8	0
Career total			106	2	5	0	111	2
