= Park Ri-ki =

Japanese footballer

Park Ri-ki 朴利基
Personal information
- Full name: Park Ri-ki
- Date of birth: July 18, 1992 (age 34)
- Place of birth: Osaka, Japan
- Height: 1.77 m (5 ft 9 1/2 in)
- Position: Midfielder

Youth career
- 2011–2014: Korea University

Senior career*
| Years | Team | Apps | (Gls) |
| 2015– | FC Ryukyu | 85 | (11) |
- * Club domestic league appearances and goals as of 5 January 2019

Park Ri-ki (born July 18, 1992) is a Japanese footballer who plays for Kochi United SC of the Shikoku Soccer League.

== Club statistics ==
Updated to 23 February 2018.

| Club performance | | | League | | Cup | | Total | |
| Season | Club | League | Apps | Goals | Apps | Goals | Apps | Goals |
| Japan | | | League | | Emperor's Cup | | Total | |
|---|---|---|---|---|---|---|---|---|
| 2015 | FC Ryukyu | J3 League | 17 | 2 | 1 | 0 | 18 | 2 |
| 2016 | FC Ryukyu | J3 League | 24 | 4 | 2 | 0 | 26 | 4 |
| 2017 | FC Ryukyu | J3 League | 26 | 3 | 0 | 0 | 26 | 3 |
| Total | | | 67 | 9 | 3 | 0 | 70 | 9 |
