= Satoki Uejō =

Japanese footballer

Satoki Uejō 上門 知樹
Personal information
- Full name: Satoki Uejō
- Date of birth: April 27, 1997 (age 29)
- Place of birth: Uruma, Okinawa, Japan
- Height: 1.66 m (5 ft 5 1/2 in)
- Position: Winger

Team information
- Current team: Cerezo Osaka
- Number: 7

Youth career
- 2007–2009: Katsuren FC
- 2010–2012: Yokatsu Junior High School
- 2013–2015: Yokatsu High School

Senior career*
Years	Team	Apps	(Gls)
2016–2019	FC Ryukyu	73	(16)
2020–2021	Fagiano Okayama	83	(20)
2022–	Cerezo Osaka	94	(8)
- * Club domestic league appearances and goals as of 10 August 2026

Satoki Uejō (上門 知樹, Uejō Satoki; born April 27, 1994) is a Japanese professional football player who plays as a winger for J1 League club Cerezo Osaka.

After developing at local club FC Ryukyu, Uejō moved to Fagiano Okayama, where he scored 20 goals in the J2 League. He then moved to Cerezo Osaka.

== Career ==
Uejō was born in Okinawa, and was raised solely by his father Yukishige. He was scouted by Kim Jong-song and offered a place at FC Ryukyu, however he was reluctant to join as he wasn't sure he could earn a stable income. Yukishige encouraged him to join FC Ryukyu. On 30 December 2015, he was promoted from Yokatsu High School to the first team of FC Ryukyu from the 2016 season. However, during his first season, he struggled, only having two shots on goal. Uejō began to train harder and interact with his teammates more in order to improve.

FC Ryukyu were promoted to the J2 League for the 2019 season. Uejō began to score regularly, scoring 14 goals in one season.

On 23 December 2019, Uejō was announced at Fagiano Okayama on a permanent transfer. He won the October 2021 Meiji Yasuda Life J2 League KONAMI Monthly MVP award for scoring 4 goals in 5 games.

On 23 December 2021, Uejō was announced at Cerezo Osaka on a permanent transfer. On 23 February 2022, he scored on his league debut against Gamba Osaka in the J.League Cup. On 9 December 2022, he signed a multi-year contract with the club until 2025. On 7 May 2023 Uejō received his first ever career red card, and apologized to Keigo Tsunemoto and the rest of the players on the pitch.

== Style of play ==
Uejō is known for his speed, powerful shooting and dribbling. His shooting skills have been described as "among the best" in the J2 League.

== Club statistics ==
As of match played 6 March 2022

Appearances and goals by club, season and competition
Club	Season	League			National cup		League cup		Total	
Club	Season	Division	Apps	Goals	Apps	Goals	Apps	Goals	Apps	Goals
Japan			League		Emperor's Cup		J. League Cup		Total	
FC Ryukyu	2016	J3 League	8	0	1	0	–		9	0
FC Ryukyu	2017	J3 League	9	0	1	0	–		10	0
FC Ryukyu	2018	J3 League	18	2	–		–		18	2
FC Ryukyu	2019	J2 League	38	14	1	1	–		39	15
FC Ryukyu	Total		73	16	3	1	0	0	76	17
Fagiano Okayama	2020	J2 League	42	7	–		–		42	7
Fagiano Okayama	2021	J2 League	41	13	1	0	–		42	13
Fagiano Okayama	Total		83	20	1	0	0	0	84	20
Cerezo Osaka	2022	J1 League	1	0	–		2	1	3	1
Career total			157	36	4	1	2	1	163	38
