= Kosuke Masutani =

Japanese footballer

Kosuke Masutani 増谷 幸祐
Personal information
- Full name: Kosuke Masutani
- Date of birth: July 1, 1993 (age 33)
- Place of birth: Asaminami-ku, Japan
- Height: 1.72 m (5 ft 7 1/2 in)
- Position: Centre back

Youth career
- 2009–2011: Ehime FC

College career
Years	Team	Apps	(Gls)
2012–2015	Nippon Sport Science University		

Senior career*
Years	Team	Apps	(Gls)
2018–2019	FC Ryukyu	56	(4)
2019	→ Fagiano Okayama (loan)	14	(0)
2020–2021	Fagiano Okayama	1	(0)
2022-2023	Gainare Tottori	52	(1)
2024	FC Ryukyu	30	(0)
2025	YSCC Yokohama	15	(1)
Total		227	(11)
- * Club domestic league appearances and goals

Kosuke Masutani (増谷 幸祐, Masutani Kōsuke; born July 1, 1993) is a Japanese former footballer who played as a centre back.

== Club statistics ==
Appearances and goals by club, season and competition
Club	Season	League			National cup (Note: Includes Emperors Cup)		League cup (Note: Includes J.League Cup)		Total	
Club	Season	Division	Apps	Goals	Apps	Goals	Apps	Goals	Apps	Goals
FC Ryukyu	2016	J3 League	28	1	2	0	0	0	30	1
FC Ryukyu	2017	J3 League	31	4	1	0	0	0	32	4
FC Ryukyu	2018	J3 League	32	2	1	0	0	0	33	2
FC Ryukyu	2019	J2 League	24	2	0	0	0	0	24	2
FC Ryukyu	Total		115	9	4	0	0	0	119	9
Fagiano Okayama (loan)	2019	J2 League	14	0	–		–		14	0
Fagiano Okayama	2020	J2 League	1	0	0	0	–		1	0
Fagiano Okayama	2021	J2 League	0	0	0	0	–		0	0
Fagiano Okayama	Total		1	0	0	0	0	0	1	0
Gainare Tottori	2022	J3 League	19	0	0	0	–		19	0
Gainare Tottori	2023	J3 League	33	1	0	0	–		33	1
Gainare Tottori	Total		52	1	0	0	0	0	52	1
FC Ryukyu	2024	J3 League	30	0	0	0	3	0	33	0
YSCC Yokohama	2025	JFL	15	1	–		–		15	1
Career total			227	11	4	0	3	0	234	11
