= Yu Tomidokoro =

Japanese footballer (born 1990)

Yu Tomidokoro 富所 悠
Personal information
- Full name: Yu Tomidokoro
- Date of birth: April 21, 1990 (age 36)
- Place of birth: Saitama, Japan
- Height: 1.75 m (5 ft 9 in)
- Position: Midfielder

Team information
- Current team: FC Ryukyu
- Number: 10

Youth career
- –2008: Tokyo Verdy

Senior career*
Years	Team	Apps	(Gls)
2009–2010	Tokyo Verdy	7	(0)
2011	Nagano Parceiro	10	(1)
2012–	FC Ryukyu	421	(59)
- * Club domestic league appearances and goals as of 25 August 2026

Yu Tomidokoro (富所 悠, born April 21, 1990) is a Japanese football player for FC Ryūkyū.

== Club statistics ==
Updated to end of 2018 season.

Club performance			League		Cup		Total	
Season	Club	League	Apps	Goals	Apps	Goals	Apps	Goals
Japan			League		Emperor's Cup		Total	
2009	Tokyo Verdy	J2 League	7	0	1	0	8	0
2010	Tokyo Verdy	J2 League	0	0	0	0	0	0
2011	Nagano Parceiro	JFL	10	1	-		10	1
2012	FC Ryukyu	JFL	28	2	1	0	29	2
2013	FC Ryukyu	JFL	11	1	1	0	12	1
2014	FC Ryukyu	J3 League	32	1	2	1	34	2
2015	FC Ryukyu	J3 League	36	3	2	0	38	3
2016	FC Ryukyu	J3 League	27	3	2	0	29	3
2017	FC Ryukyu	J3 League	32	13	1	0	33	13
2018	FC Ryukyu	J3 League	29	10	0	0	29	10
Total			212	34	10	1	222	35
