= Okinawa Athletic Park Stadium =

Stadium in Okinawa, Japan

Coordinates: 26.308612°N 127.820993°E

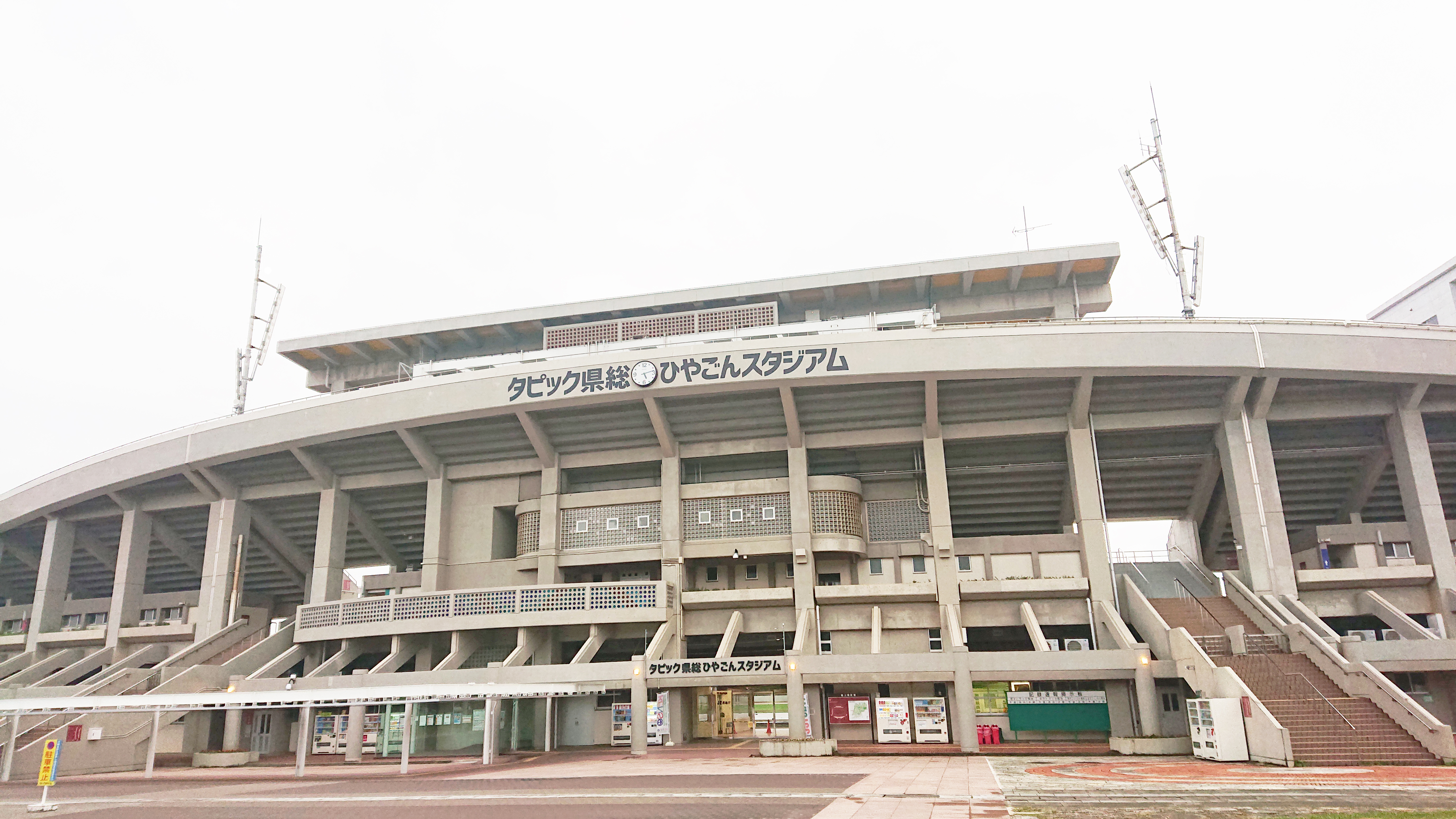
- Interactive map of Okinawa Athletic Park Stadium
- Former names: Okinawa Athletic Park Stadium (1987–2018); Tapic Kenso Hiyagon Stadium (2018–2025)
- Location: Okinawa, Japan
- Owner: Okinawa Prefecture
- Operator: TrasTec
- Capacity: 12,270
- Surface: Grass

Construction
- Opened: March 1987; 39 years ago
- Renovated: February 2015; 11 years ago

Tenants
- FC Ryukyu; Okinawa SV (2023–present)

Okinawa Prefectural Comprehensive Park Athletic Stadium (沖縄県総合運動公園陸上競技場, Okinawa-ken Sōgō Undōkōen Rikujō Kyōgi-jō), a.k.a. Okinawa Athletic Park Stadium is a multi-purpose stadium in Okinawa, Okinawa Prefecture, Japan. It is currently used mostly for football matches. It serves as a home ground of J.League club, FC Ryukyu and Japan Football League club, Okinawa SV. The stadium holds 12,270 people.

The stadium was called Tapic Kenso Hiyagon Stadium from June 2018 to March 2025, due to naming rights. It returned to be called by the original name in April 2025, as the naming rights expired.

== Gallery ==
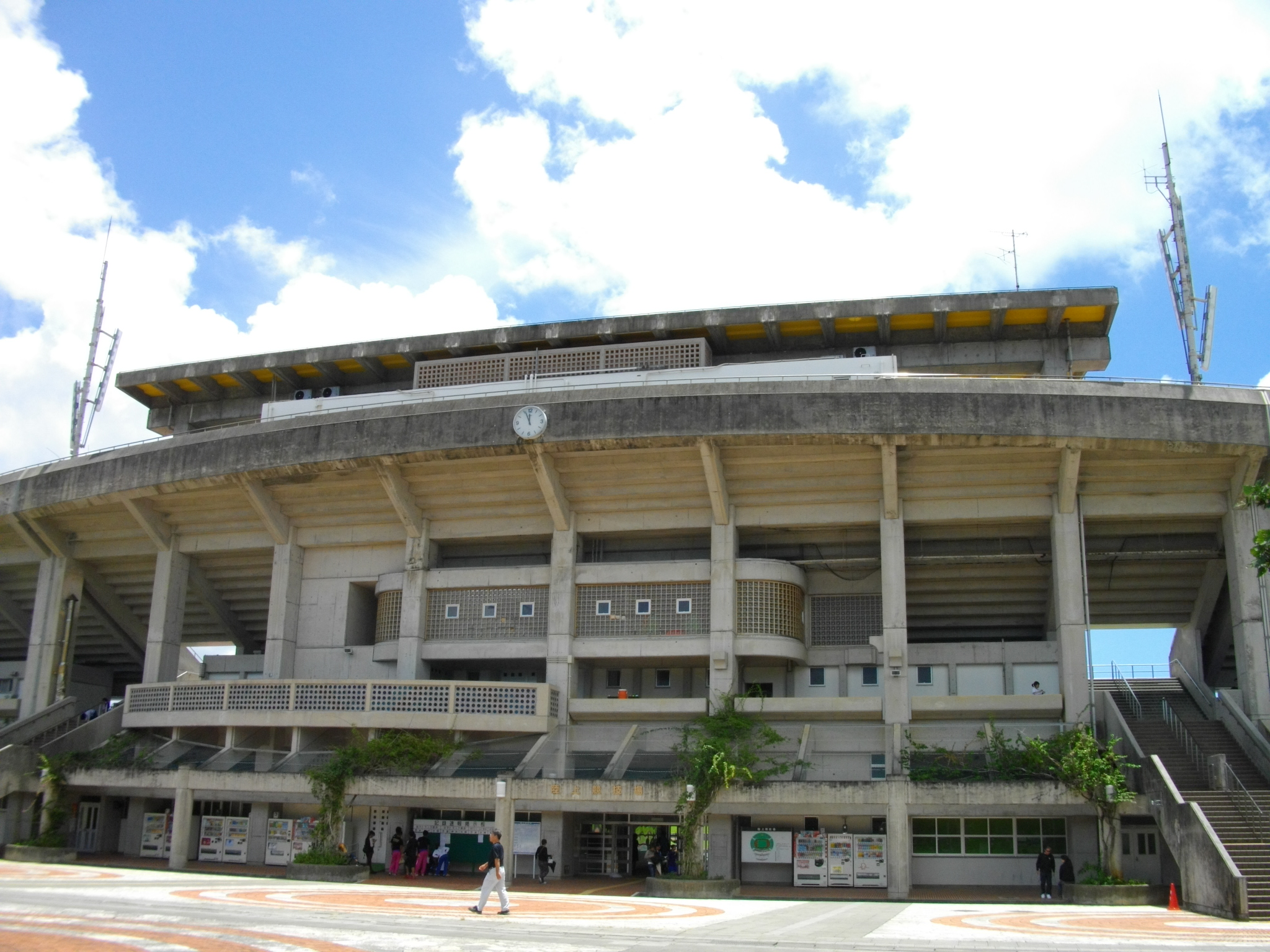
Old outside view

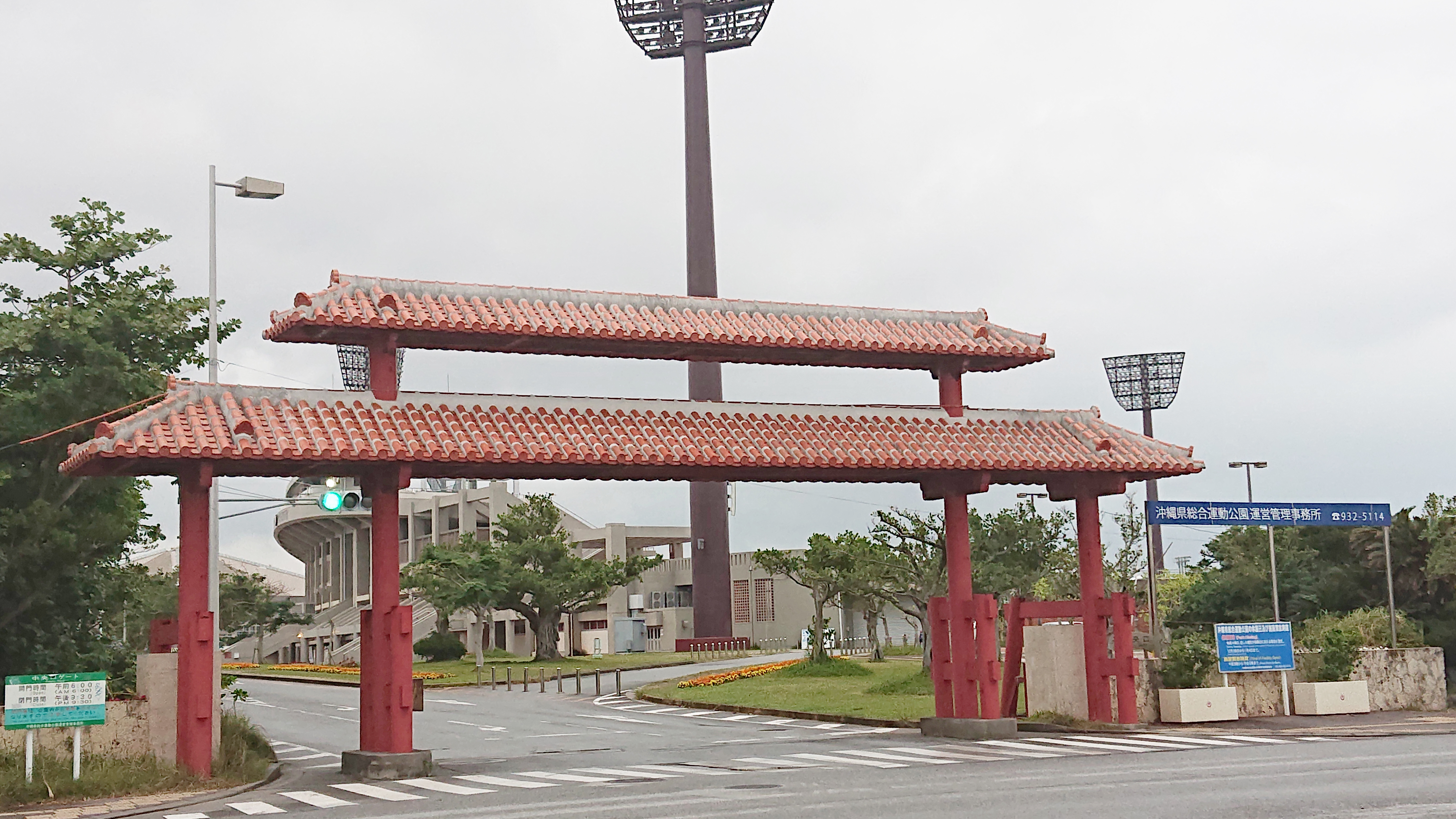
Stadium entrance

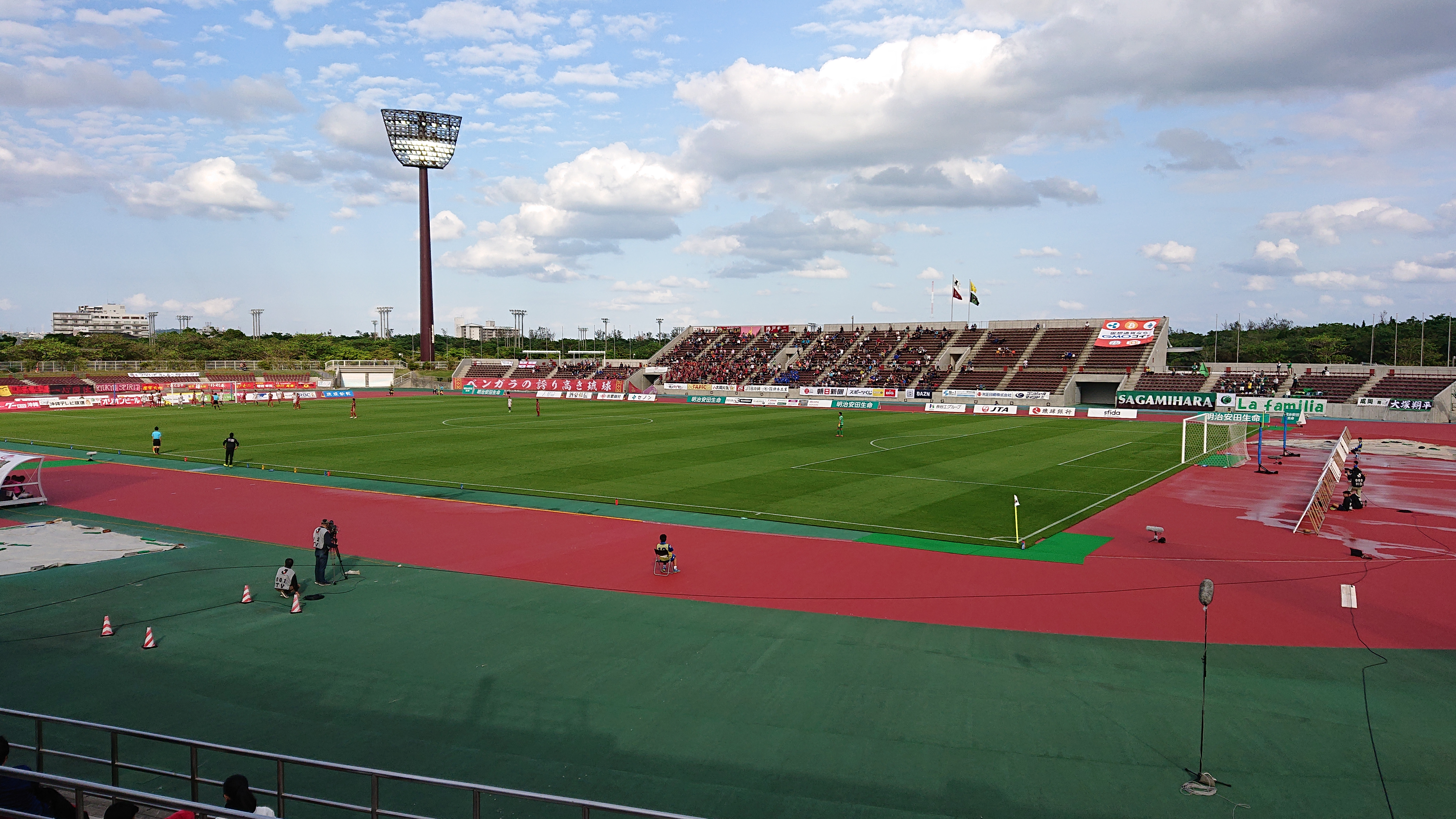
Main stand view

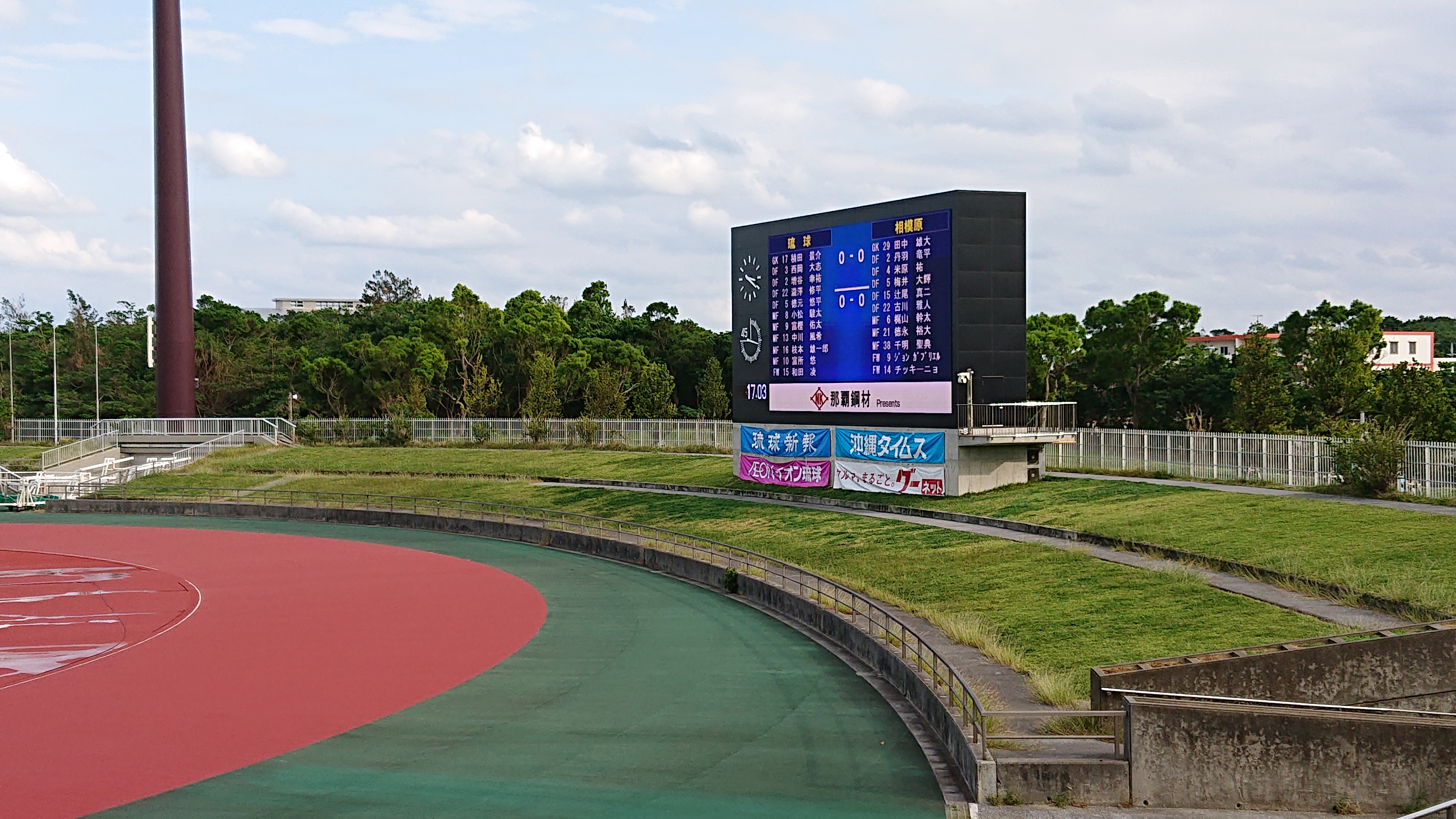
South stand view

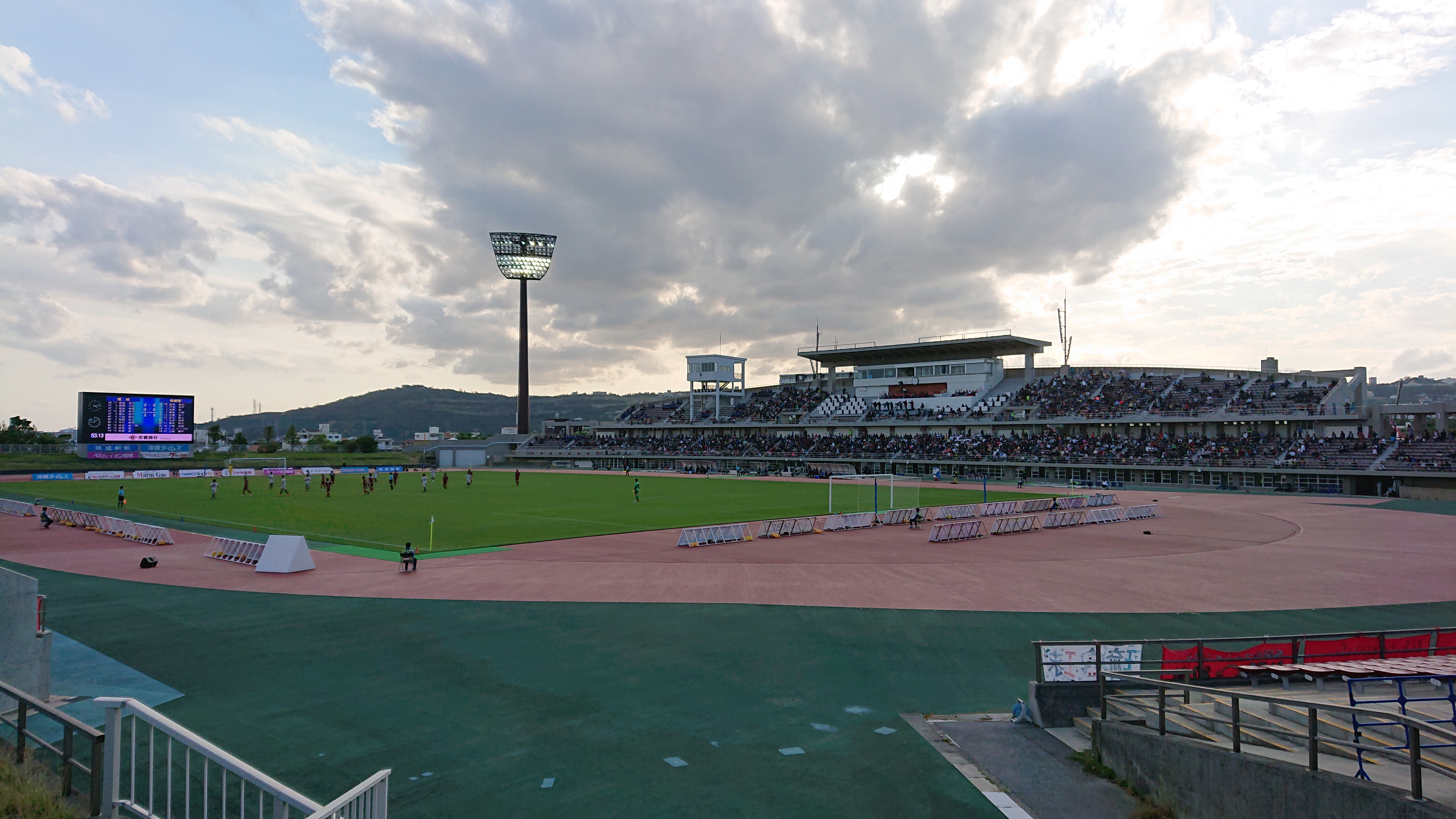
North stand view

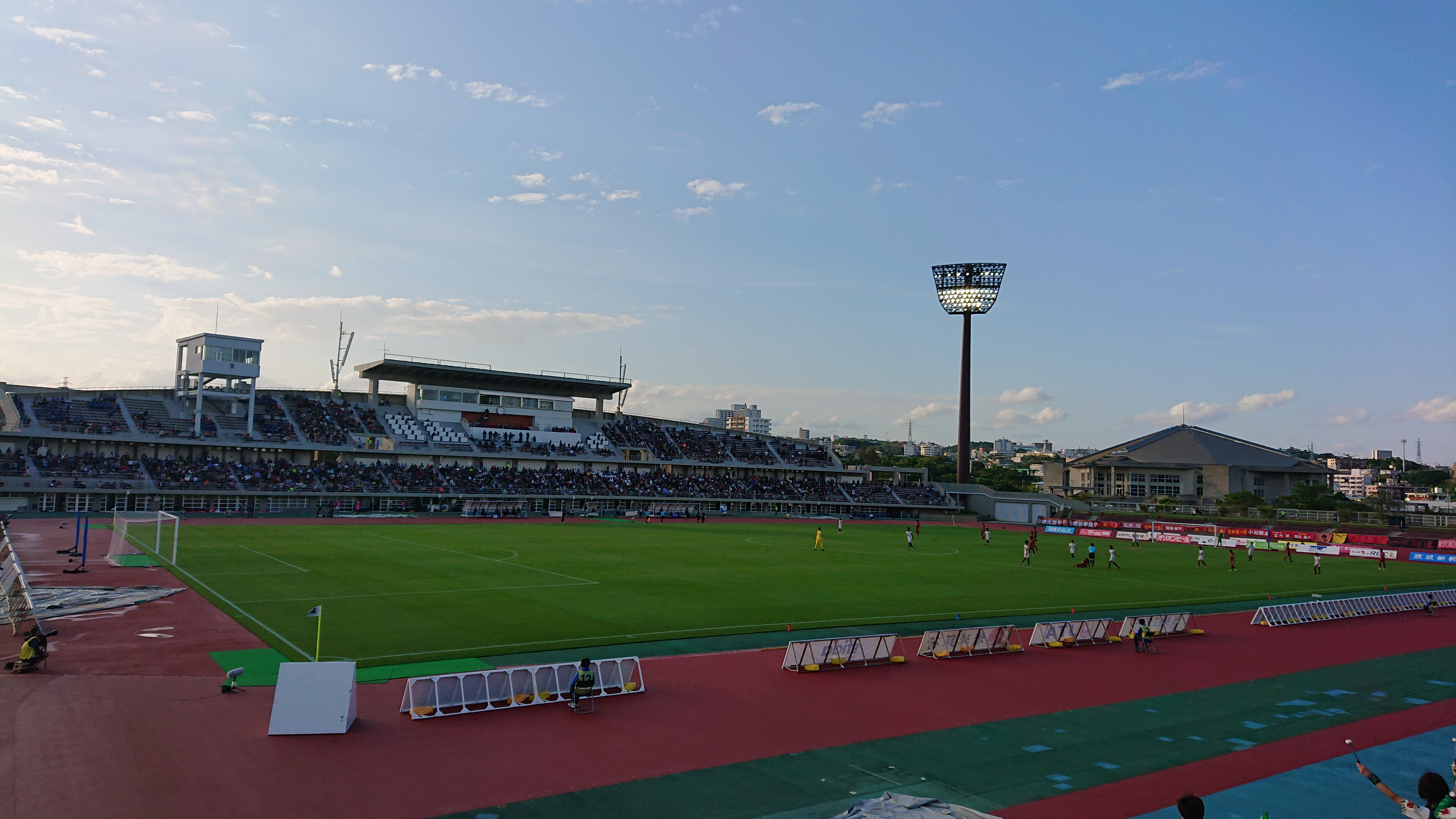
Back stand view

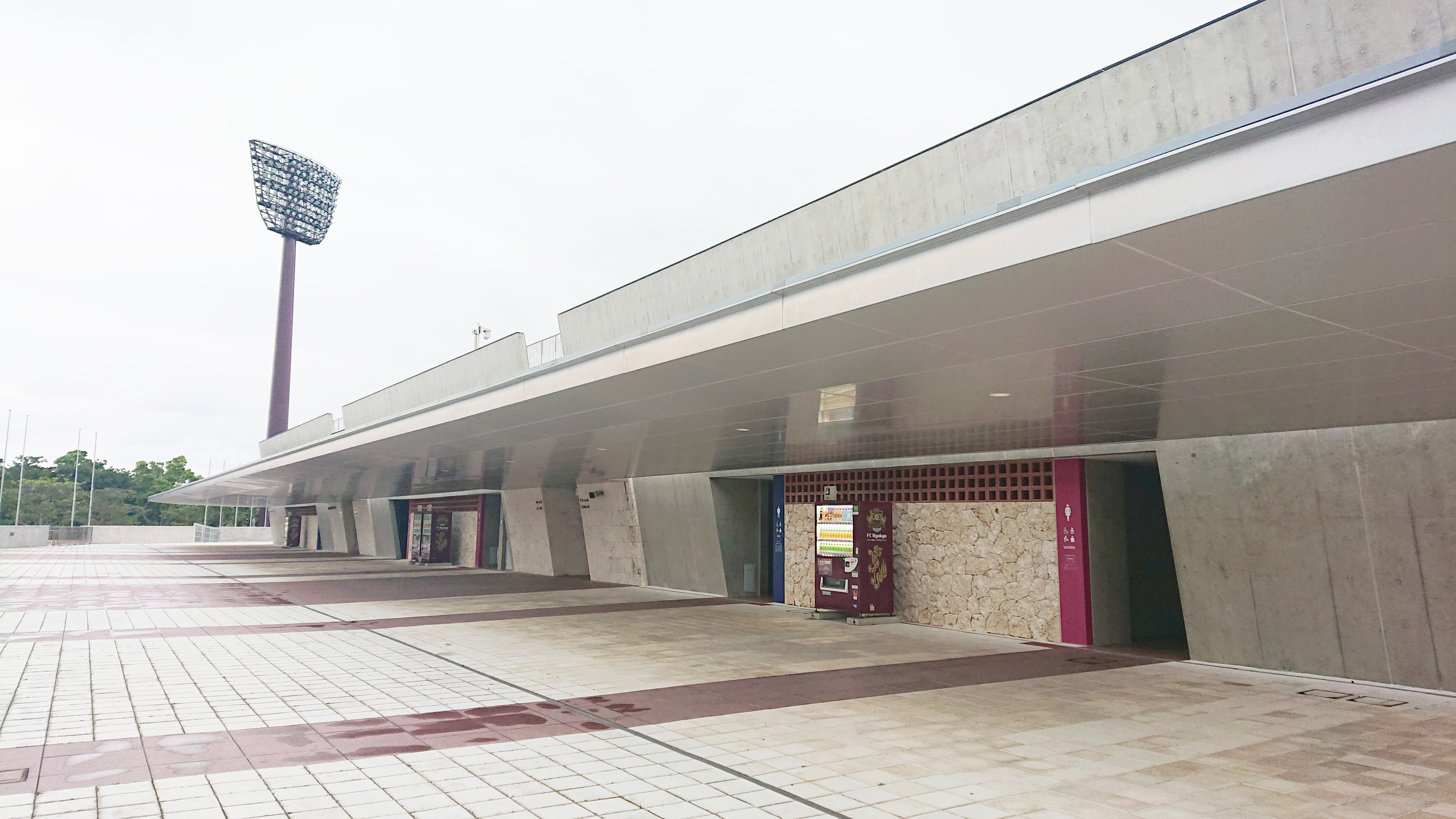
Back stand entrance

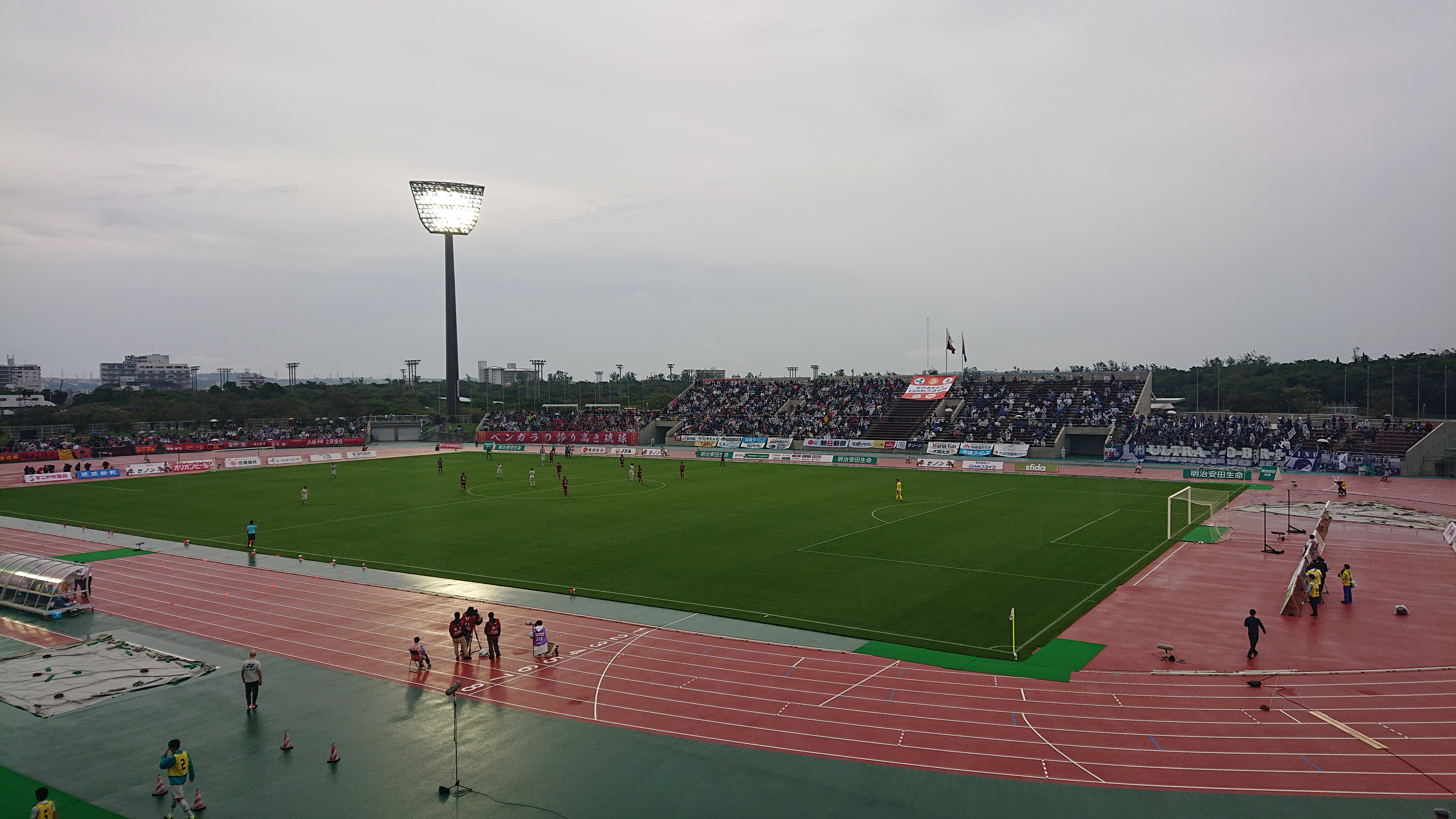
General view

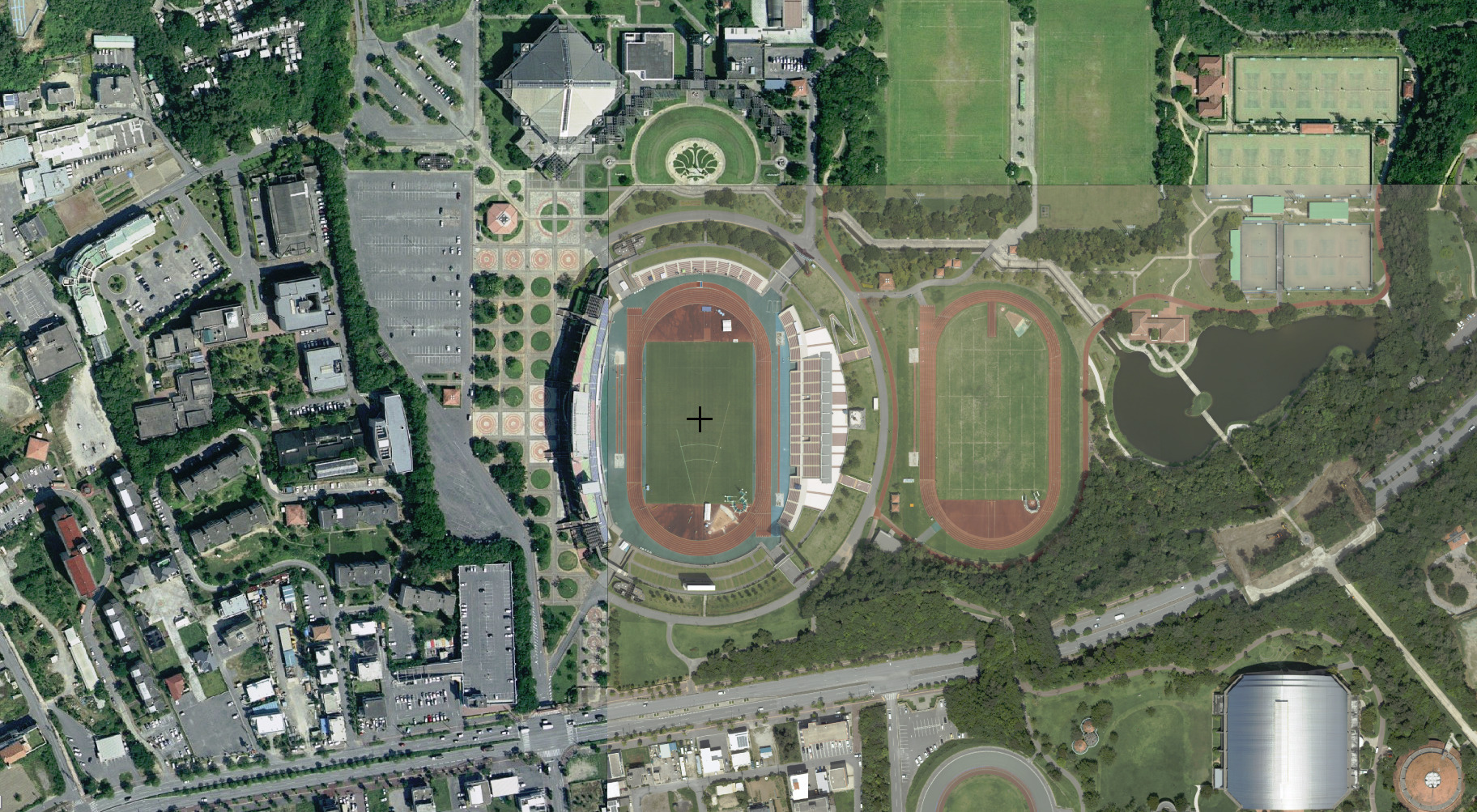
Satellite view
