= Shiranami Stadium =

Stadium in Yojiro, Japan

Coordinates: 31°33′53.39″N 130°33′36.67″E

- 白波スタジアム
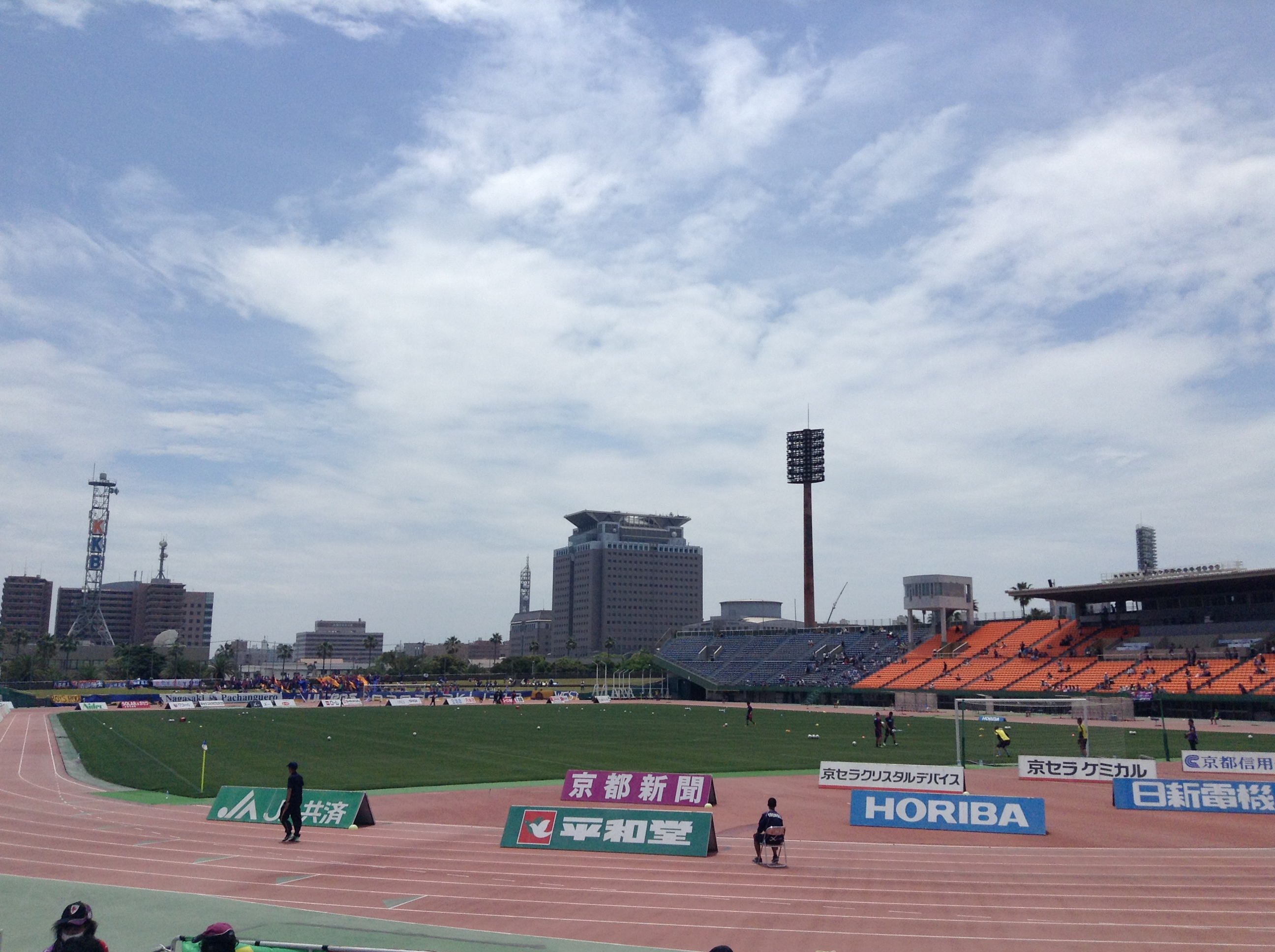

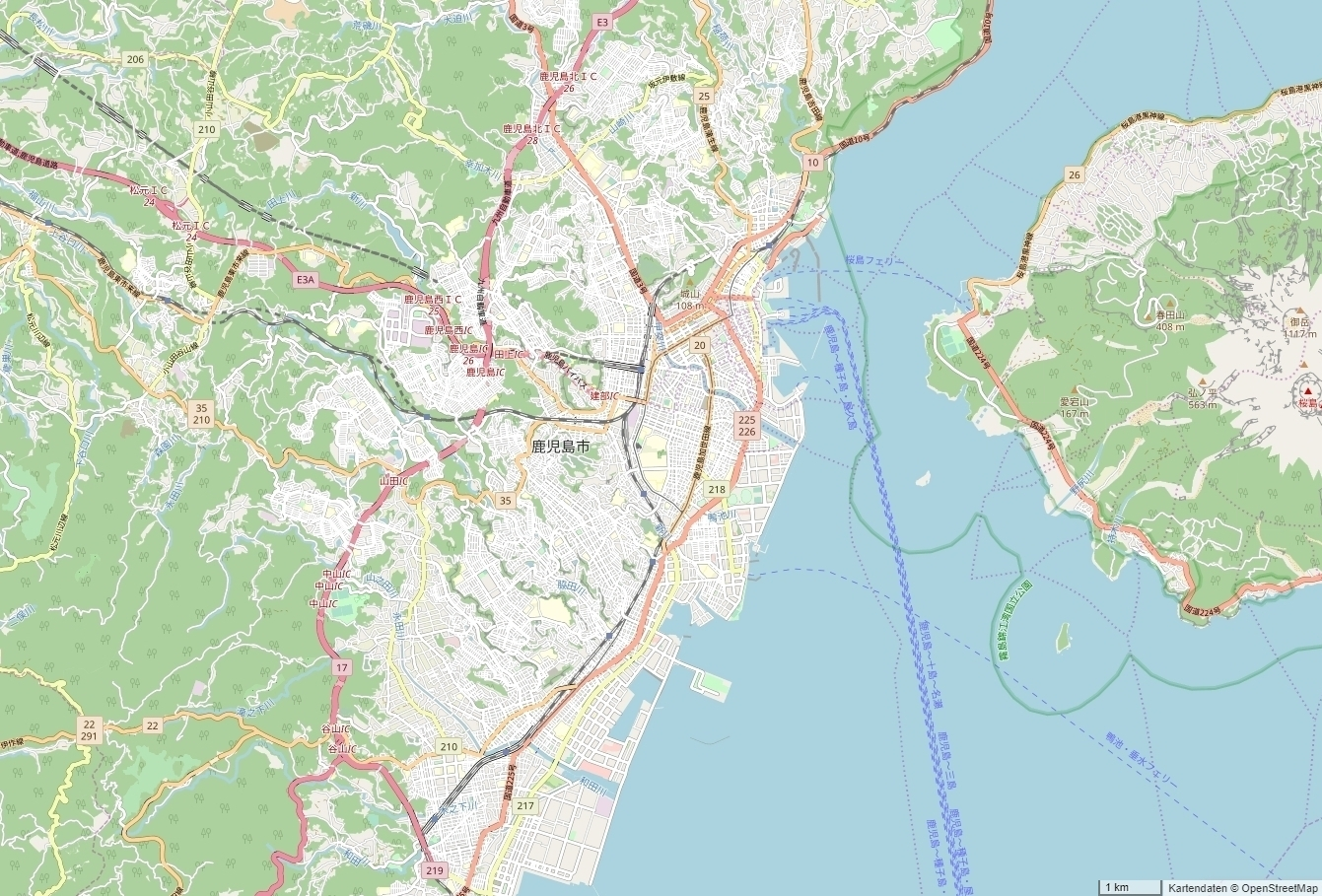
- Location within Kagoshima, Kagoshima Location within Kagoshima Prefecture Location within Japan
- Interactive map of Shiranami Stadium
- Full name: Shiranami Stadium
- Former names: Kagoshima Kamoike Stadium (1972–2018)
- Location: 2-2 Yojiro 2-chome, Kagoshima, Kagoshima, Japan
- Owner: Kagoshima Prefecture
- Operator: Seika Sports Group
- Capacity: 12,606
- Surface: Grass

Construction
- Opened: 1972

Tenants
- Kagoshima United FC; Je Vrille Kagoshima

Shiranami Stadium (白波スタジアム) is a multi-purpose stadium in Kagoshima, Japan. It is currently used mostly for football and rugby union matches.

It was formerly known as Kagoshima Kamoike Stadium. Since April 2018 it has been called Shiranami Stadium for the naming rights.

It is the home stadium of Kagoshima United FC of the Japan Football League and Je Vrille Kagoshima of the women's soccer club. The stadium was originally opened in 1972 and has an official capacity of 19,934 spectators.
