= FC Ryukyu =

Professional association football club in Okinawa, Japan

FC Ryukyu Okinawa FC琉球OKINAWA
- Full name: Football Club Ryukyu Okinawa
- Founded: 2003; 23 years ago
- Ground: Okinawa Athletic Park Stadium; Okinawa, Okinawa
- Capacity: 10,189
- Chairman: Keishiro Kurabayashi
- Manager: Tadaaki Hirakawa
- League: J3 League
- 2025: J3 League, 16th of 20
- Website: fcryukyu.com
Home colours	Away colours

FC Ryukyu Okinawa (FC琉球OKINAWA, Efu Shī Ryūkyū OKINAWA) is a Japanese professional football club based in Okinawa. The club plays in the J3 League, Japanese third tier of professional football. The team's home stadium is Okinawa Athletic Park Stadium, in Okinawa Prefecture, Japan.

The team derive their name from Ryukyu, the historic name for Okinawa Prefecture. The club once had futsal and handball teams.

== History ==
The club was founded in 2003. Many of the players who initially joined the club were former Okinawa Kariyushi FC which was disbanded after failing to win promotion to the JFL the previous year. Their first 2003 season saw them win the championship in Okinawa Prefectural Division 3 North. They were allowed to skip to Division 1 the next season, where they again succeeded in finishing top of the table.

In the 2005 season, they belonged to the Kyūshū Regional League (Kyu League). After finishing 2nd and winning the Regional League play-off, they were promoted to the JFL and became the first ever Okinawan football side who played in a national league.

In December 2007, the club appointed former Japan national coach Philippe Troussier as their general manager. Jean-Paul Rabier was appointed as their manager in January 2008.

They applied for J. League Associate Membership in January 2008, but their application was declined at the J. League board meeting held on February 19, 2008.

In December 2008, the resignation of Rabier was announced. Former coach Hiroyuki Shinzato was promoted to be the new manager in January 2009.

In 2014, FC Ryukyu could finally join the J3 League.

In January 2015, FC Ryukyu announced a partnership with Seoul United from the Korean Challengers League. According to the agreement the teams will play a friendly match every year. The first match was scheduled for 1 March 2015.

FC Ryukyu have made steady progress in recent years, finishing in 8th place in J3 in 2016, and improving on that the following year, finishing 6th.

In the 2018 season they secured promotion to J2 with 3 games left after a 1–1 draw at Nagano Parceiro, and in the following game beat Thespakusatsu Gunma to claim the J3 title with two games to spare.

They started their first season in J2 in 2019, in style with 4 straight wins to top the league, but faded as the season progressed eventually finishing in 14th place.

In 2022, after spending four years in the J2 League, the club was relegated back to the J3 League after scoring their lowest points total in the second-tier. The club finished in 21st place with 37 points, only 3 points off the last placed team.

On 26 October 2023, the club announced that they will use FC Ryukyu Okinawa for branding purpose starting 2024 season, although the club's current name will remain used in any competition. The change initially also included the update of club's emblem. However, the plan eventually revised and Ryukyu decided to keep the current emblem for 2024 season, albeit with modified colorway.

For the 2025 season, FC Ryukyu Okinawa announced a new logo.

== Home stadium ==
The home stadium is the Okinawa Athletic Park Stadium, based in Okinawa City.

Until 2014, the Okinawa City Athletic Stadium in Okinawa City was used as the main home stadium, and multiple stadiums were used.

=== Training ===
Yaese Town Sports & Tourism Exchange Facility.

== League & cup record ==
Champions	Runners-up	Third place	Promoted	Relegated

League														J. League Cup	Emperor's Cup
Season	Div.	Tier	Teams	Pos.	P	W	D	L	F	A	GD	Pts	Attendance/G	J. League Cup	Emperor's Cup
2005	Kyushu Soccer; League	4	10	2nd	18	13.5	1	3.5	51	12	-39	42	–	Not eligible	3rd round
2006	JFL	3	18	14th	34	6	11	17	29	57	-28	29	3,189	Not eligible	2nd round
2007	JFL	3	18	17th	34	7	6	21	38	82	-44	27	2,443	Not eligible	Did not qualify
2008	JFL	3	18	16th	34	7	6	21	31	58	-27	27	2,882	Not eligible	Did not qualify
2009	JFL	3	18	16th	34	11	5	18	42	57	-15	38	1,348	Not eligible	Did not qualify
2010	JFL	3	18	10th	34	14	6	14	51	51	0	48	1,777	Not eligible	2nd round
2011	JFL	3	18	9th	33	14	4	15	47	51	-4	46	1,860	Not eligible	2nd round
2012	JFL	3	17	9th	32	12	7	13	58	62	-4	43	2,164	Not eligible	1st round
2013	JFL	3	18	11th	34	12	10	12	47	51	-4	46	2,069	Not eligible	2nd round
2014	J3	3	12	9th	33	8	10	15	31	50	-19	34	1,398	Not eligible	2nd round
2015	J3	3	13	9th	36	12	9	15	45	51	-6	45	1,498	Not eligible	2nd round
2016	J3	3	16	8th	30	12	8	10	46	46	0	44	1,561	Not eligible	2nd round
2017	J3	3	17	6th	32	13	11	8	44	36	8	50	2,508	Not eligible	1st round
2018	J3	3	17	1st	32	20	6	6	70	40	30	66	3,146	Not eligible	1st round
2019	J2	2	22	14th	42	13	10	19	57	80	-23	49	4,953	Not eligible	2nd round
2020 †	J2	2	22	16th	42	14	8	20	58	61	-3	50	1,170	Not eligible	Did not qualify
2021 †	J2	2	22	9th	42	18	11	13	57	47	10	65	1,618	Not eligible	2nd round
2022	J2	2	22	21st	42	8	13	21	41	65	-24	37	1,996	Not eligible	2nd round
2023	J3	3	20	17th	38	12	7	19	43	61	-18	43	2,534	Not eligible	2nd round
2024	J3	3	20	14th	38	12	11	15	45	54	-9	47	3,007	3rd round	Did not qualify
2025	J3	3	20	16th	38	10	10	18	41	57	-16	40	2,729	1st round	Did not qualify
2026	J3	3	40	34th	18	2	7	9	13	25	-12	17	2,563	N/A	N/A
2026–27	J3	3	20	TBD	38									TBD	TBD

Key

- Pos. = Position in league; P = Games played; W = Games won; D = Games drawn; L = Games lost; F = Goals scored; A = Goals conceded; GD = Goals difference; Pts = Points gained
- Attendance/G = Average home league attendance
- † 2020 & 2021 seasons attendances reduced by COVID-19 worldwide pandemic
- Source: J.League Data Site

== Honours ==
FC Ryukyu Honours
Honour	No.	Years
Okinawa Prefectural League Division 3 North	1	2003
"Times Cup" Okinawa Prefectural Football Championship Emperor's Cup Okinawa Prefectural Qualifiers	13	2004, 2005, 2009, 2010 2011, 2012, 2013, 2014, 2015, 2016, 2017, 2018 ,2023
Okinawa Prefectural League Division 1	1	2004
Japanese Regional Promotion Series	1	2005
J3 League	1	2018

== Current squad ==
As of 1 August 2026.

Note: Flags indicate national team as defined under FIFA eligibility rules; some limited exceptions apply. Players may hold more than one non-FIFA nationality.

No.	Pos.	Nation	Player
1	GK	JPN	Hisaya Sato
3	MF	JPN	Haruki Yoshida (on loan from Nagoya Grampus)
4	DF	JPN	Hiroki Fujiharu
5	MF	SLE	Mohamed Bai Kamara
7	MF	JPN	Shunsuke Motegi
8	MF	JPN	Hayato Horiuchi
9	FW	JPN	Hayato Asakawa
10	MF	JPN	Yu Tomidokoro
11	MF	JPN	Taiga Ishiura
13	MF	JPN	Sho Iwamoto
14	DF	JPN	Junya Suzuki
15	DF	JPN	Ryota Araki
16	MF	JPN	Kazuaki Ihori
17	MF	JPN	Yuma Kato
18	FW	JPN	Yosuke Ueno

No.	Pos.	Nation	Player
19	FW	JPN	Toshikazu Teruuchi (on loan from Urawa Red Diamonds)
22	DF	JPN	Kaito Kamiya
23	FW	JPN	Kazuki Sota
24	DF	JPN	Naoki Kawaguchi
27	DF	JPN	Yuma Funabashi
30	GK	KOR	Lee Chung-won (on loan from Tegevajaro Miyazaki)
31	GK	JPN	Kotaro Miyazaki
32	MF	JPN	Fumiya Takayanagi
33	GK	JPN	Rui Miyamoto
35	DF	JPN	Kazuhiko Chiba
46	MF	JPN	Ren Ikeda
55	MF	JPN	Yushin Koki
58	DF	JPN	Sora Yamato
89	FW	JPN	Daisuke Takagi
90	FW	BRA	Vavá Guerreiro

=== Out on loan ===
Note: Flags indicate national team as defined under FIFA eligibility rules; some limited exceptions apply. Players may hold more than one non-FIFA nationality.

No.	Pos.	Nation	Player
6	MF	JPN	Koyo Shigema (at (Latvia) FK Tukums 2000)
28	MF	JPN	Jitsuki Tsuha (at Cobaltore Onagawa)

== Club officials ==
Club officials for 2025 season

Position	Name
Manager	(Japan) Tadaaki Hirakawa
Coach	(Japan) Naotsugu Obata (Japan) Jin Kanaoya
Goalkeeping coach	(Japan) Kazushi Haebaru
Analytical coach	(Japan) Teraoka Hiroki
Physical coach	(Japan) Sho Watanabe
Chief trainer	(Japan) Syuta Irei
Trainer	(Japan) Takuya Kawasaki (Japan) Ryuki Shindo (Japan) Ryota Osawa
Side manager	(Japan) Naoki Egawa

== Managerial history ==
Manager	Nationality	Tenure	
Manager	Nationality	Start	Finish
George Yonashiro	Japan	1 February 2004	31 January 2007
Hideo Yoshizawa	Japan	1 February 2007	31 January 2008
Jean-Paul Rabier	France	1 January 2008	31 December 2008
Hiroyuki Shinzato	Japan	1 February 2009	31 January 2012
Takeo Matsuda	Japan	1 February 2012	31 January 2013
Norihiro Satsukawa	Japan	1 February 2013	31 January 2016
Kim Jong-song	North Korea	1 February 2016	31 January 2019
Yasuhiro Higuchi	Japan	1 February 2019	20 October 2021
Tetsuhiro Kina	Japan	20 October 2021	8 June 2022
Kazuki Kuranuki (caretaker)	Japan	9 June 2022	13 June 2022
Nacho Fernández	Spain	14 June 2022	31 January 2023
Kazuki Kuranuki	Japan	1 February 2023	16 May 2023
Tetsuhiro Kina	Japan	16 May 2023	15 September 2023
Kim Jong-song	North Korea	16 September 2023	31 January 2025
Tadaaki Hirakawa	Japan	1 February 2025	Current

== Team colour and crest ==
FC Ryūkyū former logo until 2023

The men team's name is FC Ryukyu Okinawa.

Their team colour is bengara, a shade of red pigment. It is called red ochre in English and can be generally described as claret. Bengara derives from a Dutch word 'bengala' which in turn derives from Bengal, a historic region located in India and Bangladesh. This name was given because the pigment was traditionally imported from Bengal to Japan. Okinawa has a close association with the bengara colour which is prominently applied to Shuri Castle, one of the most symbolic historical buildings in the area.

In 2008 they adopted a sky-blue trim for their home uniform, as their bengara pigment pattern was considered too similar to Aston Villa from England (the claret and sky-blue pattern was around long before Troussier and the French staff arrived, so a coincidence in colours is feasible).

Their crest features a pair of Shisas, imaginary talismanic creatures in the area, and the crown of the kings of the former Ryukyu Kingdom.

== Kit evolution ==
Home kits - 1st
2003	2004	2005	2006 - 2007	2008
2009 - 2010	2011	2012	2013	2014
2015	2016	2017	2018	2019
2020	2021	2022	2023	2024
2025 -

Away kits - 2nd
2006 - 2007	2008	2009 - 2010	2011	2012
2013	2014	2015	2016	2017
2018	2019	2020	2021	2022
2023	2024	2025 -		

3rd kits - Other
2011 3rd	2020 charity	2021 3rd	2022 3rd	2022; Shuri Castle Reconstruction; Support Charity Match; Okinawa Legend
2023; 3rd 20th Anniversary	2024; 3rd Zimbeño	2025; 3rd Jimbeño		
