= List of J2 League football transfers winter 2018–19 =

This is a list of Japanese football J2 League transfers in the winter transfer window 2018–19 by club.

== J2 League ==
=== Kashiwa Reysol ===
In: Note: Flags indicate national team as defined under FIFA eligibility rules; some limited exceptions apply. Players may hold more than one non-FIFA nationality.

| No. | Pos. | Nation | Player |
|---|---|---|---|
| 3 | DF | JPN | Daichi Tagami (from (Japan) V-Varen Nagasaki) |
| 4 | DF | JPN | Taiyo Koga (from (Japan) Avispa Fukuoka, end of loan) |
| 5 | MF | JPN | Yusuke Kobayashi (from (Japan) Shonan Bellmare, end of loan) |
| 15 | DF | JPN | Yuta Someya (from (Japan) Kyoto Sanga) |
| 19 | MF | BRA | Gabriel (on loan from (Brazil) Flamengo) |
| 20 | DF | JPN | Takumi Kamijima (from Chuo University) |
| 30 | MF | JPN | Kazuya Murata (from (Japan) Shimizu S-Pulse) |
| 33 | DF | JPN | Shunki Takahashi (from (Japan) Vissel Kobe) |
| 34 | DF | JPN | Hayate Sugii (promoted from youth ranks) |
| 35 | MF | BRA | Richardson (from (Brazil) Ceará) |
| 36 | MF | JPN | Yuto Yamada (promoted from youth ranks) |
| 38 | MF | JPN | Daisuke Kikuchi (from (Japan) Urawa Red Diamonds) |
| — | DF | JPN | Takuya Hashiguchi (from (Japan) Machida Zelvia, end of loan) |
| — | MF | JPN | Kaito Anzai (from (Japan) Montedio Yamagata, end of loan) |

Out: Note: Flags indicate national team as defined under FIFA eligibility rules; some limited exceptions apply. Players may hold more than one non-FIFA nationality.

| No. | Pos. | Nation | Player |
|---|---|---|---|
| 3 | DF | BRA | Nathan Ribeiro (to (Brazil) Fluminense, end of loan) |
| 4 | DF | JPN | Daisuke Suzuki (to (Japan) Urawa Red Diamonds) |
| 5 | DF | JPN | Yuta Nakayama (to (Netherlands) PEC Zwolle) |
| 14 | MF | JPN | Junya Ito (on loan to (Belgium) Genk) |
| 15 | MF | KOR | Kim Bo-kyung (on loan to (South Korea) Ulsan Hyundai) |
| 19 | MF | JPN | Hiroto Nakagawa (on loan to (Japan) Shonan Bellmare) |
| 26 | MF | JPN | Ryoichi Kurisawa (retired) |
| 30 | MF | JPN | Masakatsu Sawa (released) |
| 37 | MF | JPN | Hajime Hosogai (to (Thailand) Buriram United FC) |
| 39 | DF | JPN | Masashi Kamekawa (to (Japan) V-Varen Nagasaki) |
| — | DF | JPN | Takuya Hashiguchi (on loan to (Japan) FC Maruyasu Okazaki) |
| — | MF | JPN | Hiroki Akino (to (Japan) Shonan Bellmare, previously on loan) |
| — | MF | JPN | Kaito Anzai (to (Portugal) S.C. Braga) |
| — | FW | BRA | Diego Oliveira (to (Japan) FC Tokyo, previously on loan) |

=== V-Varen Nagasaki ===
In: Note: Flags indicate national team as defined under FIFA eligibility rules; some limited exceptions apply. Players may hold more than one non-FIFA nationality.

| No. | Pos. | Nation | Player |
|---|---|---|---|
| 6 | DF | JPN | Makoto Kakuda (from (Japan) Shimizu S-Pulse) |
| 9 | FW | KOR | Lee Jong-ho (on loan from (South Korea) Ulsan Hyundai) |
| 11 | FW | JPN | Keiji Tamada (from (Japan) Nagoya Grampus) |
| 13 | DF | JPN | Masashi Kamekawa (from (Japan) Kashiwa Reysol) |
| 16 | FW | JPN | Masakazu Yoshioka (from (Japan) Kataller Toyama, end of loan) |
| 17 | FW | JPN | Yu Hasegawa (from (Japan) Shimizu S-Pulse) |
| 20 | MF | JPN | Yohei Otake (from (Japan) Fagiano Okayama) |
| 24 | DF | JPN | Yusei Egawa (promoted from youth ranks) |
| 25 | GK | JPN | Ayaki Suzuki (from (Japan) Yokohama F. Marinos) |
| 26 | DF | KOR | Lee Sang-min (on loan from (South Korea) Ulsan Hyundai) |
| 29 | FW | JPN | Junki Hata (from (Japan) Azul Claro Numazu, end of loan) |
| — | DF | JPN | Takuma Shikayama (from Tokai Gakuen University) |
| — | DF | JPN | Yuki Kagawa (from (Japan) Tokyo Verdy, end of loan) |
| — | DF | JPN | Daichi Inui (from (Japan) Sagan Tosu, end of loan) |
| — | MF | JPN | Yu Kimura (from (Japan) Kataller Toyama, end of loan) |
| — | MF | JPN | Teppei Usui (from (Japan) Thespakusatsu Gunma, end of loan) |

Out: Note: Flags indicate national team as defined under FIFA eligibility rules; some limited exceptions apply. Players may hold more than one non-FIFA nationality.

| No. | Pos. | Nation | Player |
|---|---|---|---|
| 1 | GK | JPN | Takuya Masuda (to (Japan) Sanfrecce Hiroshima, end of loan) |
| 3 | MF | JPN | Ryutaro Iio (to (Japan) Vegalta Sendai) |
| 5 | DF | JPN | Daichi Tagami (to (Japan) Kashiwa Reysol) |
| 6 | MF | JPN | Yusuke Maeda (retired) |
| 9 | FW | ESP | Juanma (to (Japan) Omiya Ardija) |
| 11 | MF | JPN | Musashi Suzuki (to (Japan) Hokkaido Consadole Sapporo) |
| 17 | MF | JPN | Shogo Nakahara (to (Japan) Hokkaido Consadole Sapporo, end of loan) |
| 20 | MF | JPN | Keita Nakamura (to (Japan) Shimizu S-Pulse) |
| 22 | GK | JPN | Tatsuro Okuda (to (Japan) Kochi United SC) |
| 29 | DF | JPN | Kensuke Fukuda (to (Japan) Tochigi SC) |
| 37 | FW | JPN | Shu Hiramatsu (to (Japan) Albirex Niigata, end of loan) |
| — | DF | JPN | Daichi Inui (to (Japan) Yokohama FC) |
| — | DF | JPN | Masakazu Tashiro (to (Japan) Yokohama FC, previously on loan) |
| — | DF | JPN | Fumitaka Kitatani (to (Japan) FC Gifu, previously on loan) |
| — | MF | JPN | Teppei Usui (on loan to (Japan) Kataller Toyama) |
| — | MF | JPN | Yu Kimura (to (Japan) Nagano Parceiro) |

=== Yokohama FC ===
In: Note: Flags indicate national team as defined under FIFA eligibility rules; some limited exceptions apply. Players may hold more than one non-FIFA nationality.

| No. | Pos. | Nation | Player |
|---|---|---|---|
| 5 | DF | JPN | Masakazu Tashiro (from (Japan) V-Varen Nagasaki, previously on loan) |
| 7 | MF | JPN | Takuya Matsuura (from (Japan) Júbilo Iwata) |
| 19 | DF | JPN | Daichi Inui (from (Japan) V-Varen Nagasaki) |
| 21 | GK | JPN | Akihiko Takeshige (from (Japan) Tochigi SC) |
| 25 | FW | JPN | Yuki Kusano (from Hannan University) |
| 26 | DF | JPN | Yutaro Hamakata (from Meiji University) |
| 27 | MF | JPN | Katsuhiro Nakayama (from Senshu University) |
| 28 | MF | JPN | Reo Yasunaga (promoted from youth ranks) |
| 31 | GK | JPN | Issei Ouchi (promoted from youth ranks) |
| 36 | GK | JPN | Shugo Tsuji (from (Japan) Sagan Tosu, previously on loan) |
| 39 | DF | JPN | Masahiko Inoha (from (Japan) Vissel Kobe) |
| — | DF | JPN | Shogo Nishikawa (from (Japan) Tochigi SC, end of loan) |
| — | MF | KOR | Jeong Chung-geun (from (Japan) Fagiano Okayama, end of loan) |
| — | FW | JPN | Yuki Nakayama (from (Japan) Kagoshima United FC, end of loan) |

Out: Note: Flags indicate national team as defined under FIFA eligibility rules; some limited exceptions apply. Players may hold more than one non-FIFA nationality.

| No. | Pos. | Nation | Player |
|---|---|---|---|
| 4 | DF | JPN | Masaki Watanabe (to (Malaysia) Perlis) |
| 7 | MF | JPN | Naoki Nomura (to (Japan) Tokushima Vortis) |
| 13 | DF | KOR | Bae Seung-jin (to (South Korea) Gyeongnam FC) |
| 16 | DF | JPN | Jumpei Arai (to (Japan) FC Ryukyu) |
| 21 | GK | JPN | Kaito Yamamoto (to (Japan) JEF United Chiba, end of loan) |
| 22 | DF | JPN | Takuya Nagata (to (Japan) Tokyo Verdy) |
| 23 | FW | BRA | Bruno Meneghel (to (Japan) Albirex Niigata, end of loan) |
| 25 | MF | JPN | Keita Ishii (to (Japan) Iwate Grulla Morioka) |
| 26 | GK | JPN | Akinori Ichikawa (on loan to (Japan) Gainare Tottori) |
| — | GK | JPN | Yohei Takaoka (to (Japan) Sagan Tosu, previously on loan) |
| — | DF | JPN | Shogo Nishikawa (to (Japan) FC Ryukyu) |
| — | MF | KOR | Jeong Chung-geun (to (Japan) Machida Zelvia) |
| — | FW | JPN | Yuki Nakayama (to (Japan) Azul Claro Numazu) |

=== Machida Zelvia ===
In: Note: Flags indicate national team as defined under FIFA eligibility rules; some limited exceptions apply. Players may hold more than one non-FIFA nationality.

| No. | Pos. | Nation | Player |
|---|---|---|---|
| 4 | DF | JPN | Masayuki Yamada (on loan from (Japan) FC Tokyo) |
| 7 | MF | JPN | Go Hayama (from (Japan) Albirex Niigata) |
| 8 | MF | KOR | Jeong Chung-geun (from (Japan) Yokohama FC) |
| 8 | FW | JPN | Cayman Togashi (from (Japan) Yokohama F. Marinos) |
| 13 | GK | JPN | Takuya Masuda (on loan from (Japan) Sanfrecce Hiroshima) |
| 17 | DF | JPN | Koki Shimosaka (from (Japan) Albirex Niigata, end of loan) |
| 18 | FW | JPN | Yuki Okada (from Waseda University) |
| 23 | DF | JPN | Ryusuke Sakai (from (Japan) Nagoya Grampus, previously on loan) |
| 25 | MF | JPN | Kaishu Sano (from Yonago Kita High School) |
| 27 | DF | JPN | So Hirao (from (Japan) Gamba Osaka) |
| 28 | FW | JPN | Ryujoseph Hashimura (promoted from youth ranks) |
| — | DF | JPN | Noboru Shimura (on loan from (Serbia) FK Spartak Subotica) |

Out: Note: Flags indicate national team as defined under FIFA eligibility rules; some limited exceptions apply. Players may hold more than one non-FIFA nationality.

| No. | Pos. | Nation | Player |
|---|---|---|---|
| 4 | DF | KOR | Jung Han-cheol (on loan to (Japan) YSCC Yokohama) |
| 7 | MF | JPN | Koki Sugimori (to (Japan) Nagoya Grampus, end of loan) |
| 8 | MF | JPN | Taiki Hirato (to (Japan) Kashima Antlers, end of loan) |
| 9 | FW | JPN | Koji Suzuki (to (Japan) FC Ryukyu) |
| 10 | MF | JPN | Kohei Tokita (retired) |
| 11 | FW | JPN | Yuya Nakamura (to (Japan) Tochigi City FC) |
| 13 | DF | JPN | Shunsuke Ota (to (Japan) Tochigi City FC) |
| 14 | MF | JPN | Ryohei Yoshihama (to (Japan) Renofa Yamaguchi) |
| 21 | GK | JPN | Toshiyasu Takahara (retired) |
| 22 | DF | JPN | Takuya Hashiguchi (to (Japan) Kashiwa Reysol, end of loan) |

=== Omiya Ardija ===
In: Note: Flags indicate national team as defined under FIFA eligibility rules; some limited exceptions apply. Players may hold more than one non-FIFA nationality.

| No. | Pos. | Nation | Player |
|---|---|---|---|
| 5 | MF | JPN | Toshiki Ishikawa (from (Japan) Shonan Bellmare) |
| 22 | FW | ESP | Juanma (from (Japan) V-Varen Nagasaki) |
| 26 | MF | JPN | Masato Kojima (from (Japan) Mito HollyHock, end of loan) |
| 36 | FW | JPN | Shoi Yoshinaga (promoted from youth ranks) |
| 41 | MF | JPN | Masashito Ono (from Meiji University) |
| 50 | DF | JPN | Hiroto Hatao (from (Japan) Nagoya Grampus, previously on loan) |
| — | GK | JPN | Keiki Shimizu (from (Japan) Blaublitz Akita, end of loan) |
| — | MF | JPN | Riku Yamada (from (Japan) Iwate Grulla Morioka, end of loan) |
| — | FW | JPN | Takumu Fujinuma (from (Japan) Iwate Grulla Morioka, end of loan) |

Out: Note: Flags indicate national team as defined under FIFA eligibility rules; some limited exceptions apply. Players may hold more than one non-FIFA nationality.

| No. | Pos. | Nation | Player |
|---|---|---|---|
| 1 | GK | JPN | Nobuhiro Kato (to (Japan) Kyoto Sanga) |
| 11 | FW | BRA | Marcelo Toscano (to (Brazil) América Mineiro) |
| 14 | FW | JPN | Shintaro Shimizu (on loan to (Japan) Mito HollyHock) |
| 16 | MF | BRA | Mateus (to (Japan) Nagoya Grampus) |
| 17 | MF | JPN | Shigeru Yokotani (to (Japan) Ventforet Kofu) |
| 35 | DF | KOR | Kim Dong-su (released) |
| — | MF | JPN | Riku Yamada (on loan to (Japan) Nagano Parceiro) |
| — | MF | BRA | Cauê (to (Japan) Albirex Niigata, previously on loan) |
| — | FW | JPN | Takumu Fujinuma (on loan to (Japan) Blaublitz Akita) |

=== Tokyo Verdy ===
In: Note: Flags indicate national team as defined under FIFA eligibility rules; some limited exceptions apply. Players may hold more than one non-FIFA nationality.

| No. | Pos. | Nation | Player |
|---|---|---|---|
| 3 | DF | JPN | Naoya Kondo (from (Japan) JEF United Chiba) |
| 15 | DF | JPN | Tatsuya Anzai (from Chuo University) |
| 16 | MF | JPN | Koki Morita (promoted from youth ranks) |
| 18 | FW | JPN | Jin Hanato (on loan from (Japan) Shonan Bellmare) |
| 19 | MF | JPN | Junki Koike (from (Japan) Ehime FC) |
| 20 | MF | JPN | Rihito Yamamoto (promoted from youth ranks) |
| 22 | DF | JPN | Takuya Nagata (from (Japan) Yokohama FC) |
| 24 | MF | JPN | Yuta Narawa (from (Japan) Shonan Bellmare, previously on loan) |
| 26 | GK | JPN | Tomoyuki Suzuki (from (Japan) Matsumoto Yamaga) |
| 27 | FW | SRB | Nemanja Kojić (from (Kazakhstan) FC Ordabasy) |
| 30 | FW | BRA | Walmerson (on loan from (Brazil) Colorado AC) |
| 33 | MF | JPN | Hiroki Kawano (on loan from (Japan) Sagan Tosu) |

Out: Note: Flags indicate national team as defined under FIFA eligibility rules; some limited exceptions apply. Players may hold more than one non-FIFA nationality.

| No. | Pos. | Nation | Player |
|---|---|---|---|
| 3 | DF | JPN | Akira Ibayashi (to (Japan) Sanfrecce Hiroshima) |
| 4 | DF | JPN | Yuki Kagawa (to (Japan) V-Varen Nagasaki, end of loan) |
| 6 | MF | JPN | Jin Izumisawa (to (Japan) Gamba Osaka, end of loan) |
| 7 | FW | BRA | Alan Pinheiro (to (Japan) JEF United Chiba) |
| 9 | FW | BRA | Douglas Vieira (to (Japan) Sanfrecce Hiroshima) |
| 13 | DF | JPN | Yusuke Higa (retired) |
| 15 | DF | JPN | Shogo Hayashi (released) |
| 19 | DF | JPN | Mitsuru Nagata (released) |
| 27 | MF | JPN | Hideo Hashimoto (to (Japan) FC Imabari) |
| 28 | FW | JPN | Hiroki Sugajima (released) |
| 29 | FW | JPN | Shunsuke Mori (to (Japan) Albirex Niigata, end of loan) |
| 31 | GK | JPN | Hiroyuki Takeda (to (Japan) FC TIAMO Hirakata) |
| — | GK | JPN | Gakuji Ota (to (Japan) Kataller Toyama, previously on loan) |
| — | FW | JPN | Daisuke Takagi (to (Japan) Renofa Yamaguchi, previously on loan) |

=== Avispa Fukuoka ===
In: Note: Flags indicate national team as defined under FIFA eligibility rules; some limited exceptions apply. Players may hold more than one non-FIFA nationality.

| No. | Pos. | Nation | Player |
|---|---|---|---|
| 1 | GK | ESP | Jon Ander Serantes (from (Spain) CD Leganés) |
| 3 | DF | JPN | Hirokazu Ishihara (on loan from (Japan) Shonan Bellmare) |
| 14 | MF | JPN | Taiga Maekawa (on loan from (Japan) Cerezo Osaka) |
| 19 | MF | JPN | Sotan Tanabe (from (Japan) FC Tokyo) |
| 20 | DF | JPN | Kenedei Ebusu Mikuni (from Aomori Yamada High School) |
| 24 | DF | JPN | Kaito Kuwahara (promoted from youth ranks) |
| 25 | MF | JPN | Yuji Kitajima (promoted from youth ranks) |
| 26 | MF | JPN | Hinata Kida (on loan from (Japan) Cerezo Osaka) |
| 36 | DF | JPN | Naoya Kikuchi (from (Japan) Hokkaido Consadole Sapporo) |

Out: Note: Flags indicate national team as defined under FIFA eligibility rules; some limited exceptions apply. Players may hold more than one non-FIFA nationality.

| No. | Pos. | Nation | Player |
|---|---|---|---|
| 1 | GK | JPN | Ryuichi Kamiyama (to (Japan) ReinMeer Aomori FC) |
| 3 | DF | JPN | Yūichi Komano (to (Japan) FC Imabari) |
| 14 | MF | JPN | Takuma Edamura (to (Japan) Shimizu S-Pulse, end of loan) |
| 18 | FW | BRA | Dudu (to (Japan) Ventforet Kofu, end of loan) |
| 19 | DF | JPN | Shunsuke Tsutsumi (to (Japan) Kagoshima United FC) |
| 21 | GK | JPN | Kentaro Kakoi (to (Japan) Cerezo Osaka, end of loan) |
| 26 | DF | JPN | Taiyo Koga (to (Japan) Kashiwa Reysol, end of loan) |
| 27 | DF | JPN | So Hirao (to (Japan) Gamba Osaka, end of loan) |
| 30 | DF | JPN | Koki Shimosaka (to (Japan) Machida Zelvia, end of loan) |
| 33 | MF | JPN | Koji Yamase (to (Japan) Ehime FC) |
| 35 | FW | BRA | Léo Mineiro (to (Japan) Fagiano Okayama) |

=== Renofa Yamaguchi ===
In: Note: Flags indicate national team as defined under FIFA eligibility rules; some limited exceptions apply. Players may hold more than one non-FIFA nationality.

| No. | Pos. | Nation | Player |
|---|---|---|---|
| 1 | GK | JPN | Takumi Nagaishi (on loan from (Japan) Cerezo Osaka) |
| 7 | MF | JPN | Paulo Junichi Tanaka (from (Japan) FC Gifu) |
| 8 | MF | JPN | Takumi Sasaki (on loan from (Japan) Vegalta Sendai) |
| 14 | MF | JPN | Ryohei Yoshihama (from (Japan) Machida Zelvia) |
| 15 | DF | UZB | Dostonbek Tursunov (from (Uzbekistan) Neftchi Fergana) |
| 18 | FW | JPN | Daisuke Takagi (from (Japan) Tokyo Verdy, previously on loan) |
| 19 | FW | JPN | Masato Kudo (on loan from (Japan) Sanfrecce Hiroshima) |
| 21 | DF | JPN | Takahiro Tanaka (from (Japan) Briobecca Urayasu) |
| 22 | DF | JPN | Kaito Oki (from Kokoku High School) |
| 33 | GK | JPN | Genki Yamada (from (Japan) Kyoto Sanga, previously on loan) |
| 40 | DF | JPN | Kazuya Onohara (from Ryutsu Keizai University) |
| 49 | DF | JPN | Ryuho Kikuchi (from Osaka University of Health & Sport Sciences) |
| 50 | GK | JPN | Riku Hirosue (on loan from (Japan) FC Tokyo) |

Out: Note: Flags indicate national team as defined under FIFA eligibility rules; some limited exceptions apply. Players may hold more than one non-FIFA nationality.

| No. | Pos. | Nation | Player |
|---|---|---|---|
| 1 | GK | JPN | Masaaki Murakami (on loan to (Japan) Mito HollyHock) |
| 3 | DF | JPN | Kodai Watanabe (on loan to (Japan) Thespakusatsu Gunma) |
| 4 | DF | JPN | Yohei Fukumoto (to (Japan) Verspah Oita) |
| 7 | MF | JPN | Junya Osaki (to (Japan) Tochigi SC) |
| 8 | MF | BRA | Julinho (to (Japan) Hokkaido Consadole Sapporo, end of loan) |
| 14 | MF | JPN | Issei Takayanagi (to (Japan) Okinawa SV) |
| 19 | FW | JPN | Ado Onaiwu (to (Japan) Urawa Red Diamonds, end of loan) |
| 21 | DF | JPN | Yuma Hiroki (to (Japan) Fagiano Okayama) |
| 27 | FW | JPN | Tsugutoshi Oishi (to (Japan) SC Sagamihara) |
| 28 | MF | JPN | Issei Takahashi (to (Japan) JEF United Chiba, end of loan) |
| 32 | MF | JPN | Mitsuru Maruoka (to (Japan) Cerezo Osaka, end of loan) |
| 35 | MF | BRA | Washington (to (Brazil) Brasil de Pelotas) |
| 41 | MF | JPN | Ryuji Hirota (to (Japan) Iwate Grulla Morioka) |
| 44 | GK | JPN | Eisuke Fujishima (on loan to (Japan) Kawasaki Frontale) |
| — | DF | KOR | Min Kyung-joon (to (Japan) FC Kariya, previously on loan) |

=== Ventforet Kofu ===
In: Note: Flags indicate national team as defined under FIFA eligibility rules; some limited exceptions apply. Players may hold more than one non-FIFA nationality.

| No. | Pos. | Nation | Player |
|---|---|---|---|
| 3 | DF | JPN | Tatsushi Koyanagi (from (Japan) Zweigen Kanazawa) |
| 9 | FW | NGR | Peter Utaka (from (Japan) Tokushima Vortis) |
| 10 | FW | BRA | Dudu (from (Japan) Avispa Fukuoka, end of loan) |
| 14 | MF | JPN | Shigeru Yokotani (from (Japan) Omiya Ardija) |
| 17 | FW | JPN | Hidetaka Kanazono (from (Japan) Hokkaido Consadole Sapporo, previously on loan) |
| 18 | FW | JPN | Koichi Sato (from (Japan) Zweigen Kanazawa) |
| 19 | FW | JPN | Junma Miyazaki (from Yamanashi Gakuin High School) |
| 20 | MF | JPN | Kyosuke Goto (from (Japan) YSCC Yokohama) |
| 27 | MF | JPN | Iwana Kobayashi (from Senshu University) |
| 39 | DF | JPN | Kenta Uchida (from (Japan) Nagoya Grampus) |
| 41 | DF | JPN | Yuto Takeoka (from (Japan) Kawasaki Frontale) |
| — | MF | JPN | Riku Nakayama (from Tokai University Sagami High School) |
| — | FW | BRA | Lins (from (Japan) FC Tokyo, end of loan) |

Out: Note: Flags indicate national team as defined under FIFA eligibility rules; some limited exceptions apply. Players may hold more than one non-FIFA nationality.

| No. | Pos. | Nation | Player |
|---|---|---|---|
| 5 | MF | JPN | Ryo Kubota (to (Japan) Thespakusatsu Gunma) |
| 7 | MF | JPN | Yuki Horigome (to (Japan) JEF United Chiba) |
| 11 | FW | BRA | Diego (released) |
| 15 | MF | BRA | Ferrugem (to (Brazil) CRB) |
| 18 | MF | JPN | Ryohei Michibuchi (to (Japan) Vegalta Sendai) |
| 19 | MF | JPN | Kazuki Kozuka (to (Japan) Oita Trinita) |
| 20 | MF | JPN | Toshio Shimakawa (to (Japan) Oita Trinita) |
| 27 | DF | JPN | Shohei Abe (to (Japan) Tokyo City FC) |
| 30 | MF | JPN | Kohei Shimizu (to (Japan) Shimizu S-Pulse, end of loan) |
| 32 | DF | JPN | Keita Irumagawa (on loan to (Japan) Nagano Parceiro) |
| 33 | DF | JPN | Takuya Akiyama (to (Japan) Tokushima Vortis) |
| 35 | DF | JPN | Ryo Takano (to (Japan) Yokohama F. Marinos, end of loan) |
| 44 | MF | JPN | Takayuki Seto (to (Latvia) FK Rīgas Futbola Skola) |
| — | DF | KOR | Byeon Jun-byum (to (South Korea) Seoul E-Land) |

=== Mito HollyHock ===
In: Note: Flags indicate national team as defined under FIFA eligibility rules; some limited exceptions apply. Players may hold more than one non-FIFA nationality.

| No. | Pos. | Nation | Player |
|---|---|---|---|
| 7 | MF | JPN | Takaaki Shichi (from (Japan) Matsumoto Yamaga) |
| 8 | MF | JPN | Hiroyuki Mae (from (Japan) Hokkaido Consadole Sapporo, previously on loan) |
| 11 | FW | JPN | Koichi Murata (from Meiji University) |
| 13 | DF | JPN | Shohei Kishida (from (Japan) Oita Trinita) |
| 14 | FW | JPN | Shintaro Shimizu (on loan from (Japan) Omiya Ardija) |
| 20 | MF | JPN | Yuto Mori (from (Japan) Gamba Osaka) |
| 21 | GK | JPN | Masaaki Murakami (on loan from (Japan) Renofa Yamaguchi) |
| 22 | DF | JPN | Shuhei Takizawa (from (Japan) FC Ryukyu) |
| 23 | MF | JPN | Ryo Toyama (from (Japan) Blaublitz Akita, end of loan) |
| 25 | MF | JPN | Yuto Hiratsuka (from Sapporo University) |
| 27 | MF | JPN | Shunsuke Motegi (from (Japan) Vegalta Sendai, previously on loan) |
| 45 | MF | JPN | Yuya Asano (from Osaka University of Health & Sport Sciences) |
| — | GK | JPN | Ryo Ishii (from (Japan) Fukushima United FC, end of loan) |
| — | GK | JPN | Yuto Koizumi (from (Japan) Iwate Grulla Morioka, end of loan) |
| — | DF | JPN | Takaaki Kinoshita (from (Japan) Fujieda MYFC, end of loan) |
| — | MF | JPN | Ryuya Motoda (from (Japan) Vanraure Hachinohe, end of loan) |

Out: Note: Flags indicate national team as defined under FIFA eligibility rules; some limited exceptions apply. Players may hold more than one non-FIFA nationality.

| No. | Pos. | Nation | Player |
|---|---|---|---|
| 2 | DF | JPN | Taiki Tamukai (to (Japan) Tokushima Vortis) |
| 6 | DF | BRA | Diego (to (Brazil) Joinville EC, end of loan) |
| 7 | MF | JPN | Keisuke Funatani (to (Japan) FC Maruyasu Okazaki) |
| 9 | FW | BRA | Jefferson Baiano (to (Brazil) Santa Rica, end of loan) |
| 13 | MF | JPN | Keita Tanaka (to (Japan) FC Ryukyu) |
| 17 | DF | JPN | Daisuke Tomita (released) |
| 14 | MF | JPN | Sho Sato (to (Japan) Thespakusatsu Gunma) |
| 26 | MF | JPN | Masato Kojima (to (Japan) Omiya Ardija, end of loan) |
| 29 | GK | CRC | Danny Carvajal (to (Japan) FC Ryukyu) |
| 33 | DF | JPN | Ryoji Fukui (to (Japan) FC Ryukyu) |
| 39 | MF | JPN | Ryuya Motoda (to (Japan) Kochi United SC) |
| 40 | FW | JPN | Takeru Kishimoto (to (Japan) Cerezo Osaka, end of loan) |
| 41 | FW | JPN | Takamasa Abiko (to (Japan) YSCC Yokohama) |
| 44 | DF | JPN | Yuto Nagasaka (to (Japan) Hokkaido Consadole Sapporo, end of loan) |
| 46 | MF | JPN | Ryotaro Ito (to (Japan) Urawa Red Diamonds, end of loan) |
| — | GK | JPN | Yuto Koizumi (to (Japan) Thespakusatsu Gunma) |
| — | GK | JPN | Ryo Ishii (on loan to (Japan) FC Ryukyu) |
| — | DF | JPN | Junya Imase (to (Japan) Kataller Toyama, previously on loan) |
| — | DF | JPN | Takaaki Kinoshita (on loan to (Japan) Iwate Grulla Morioka) |

=== Tokushima Vortis ===
In: Note: Flags indicate national team as defined under FIFA eligibility rules; some limited exceptions apply. Players may hold more than one non-FIFA nationality.

| No. | Pos. | Nation | Player |
|---|---|---|---|
| 1 | GK | JPN | Kengo Nagai (on loan from (Japan) Matsumoto Yamaga) |
| 2 | DF | JPN | Taiki Tamukai (from (Japan) Mito HollyHock) |
| 3 | MF | NED | Jordy Buijs (on loan from (Japan) V-Varen Nagasaki) |
| 4 | DF | BRA | Diego (from (Brazil) Joinville EC) |
| 9 | FW | JPN | Atsushi Kawata (from (Japan) Albirex Niigata) |
| 11 | MF | JPN | Naoki Nomura (from (Japan) Yokohama FC) |
| 13 | MF | JPN | Koki Kiyotake (from (Japan) JEF United Chiba) |
| 15 | FW | JPN | Takeru Kishimoto (on loan from (Japan) Cerezo Osaka) |
| 17 | FW | JPN | Genta Omotehara (from (Japan) Shonan Bellmare, previously on loan) |
| 19 | DF | JPN | Daisei Suzuki (from University of Tsukuba) |
| 20 | DF | JPN | Shota Fukuoka (from (Japan) Tochigi SC) |
| 22 | MF | JPN | Seiya Fujita (from (Japan) Shonan Bellmare) |
| 23 | DF | JPN | Tokuma Suzuki (from University of Tsukuba) |
| 26 | DF | JPN | Takuya Akiyama (from (Japan) Ventforet Kofu) |
| 27 | MF | THA | Chakkit Laptrakul (on loan from (Thailand) BG Pathum United) |
| 28 | DF | JPN | Kotaro Kume (promoted from youth ranks) |
| 33 | FW | JPN | Shiryu Fujiwara (promoted from youth ranks) |
| — | MF | JPN | Chie Edoojon Kawakami (from (Japan) Kataller Toyama, end of loan) |

Out: Note: Flags indicate national team as defined under FIFA eligibility rules; some limited exceptions apply. Players may hold more than one non-FIFA nationality.

| No. | Pos. | Nation | Player |
|---|---|---|---|
| 1 | GK | JPN | Taku Akahoshi (to (Japan) Sagan Tosu, end of loan) |
| 2 | DF | BRA | Bueno (to (Japan) Kashima Antlers, end of loan) |
| 4 | DF | JPN | Kotaro Fujiwara (to (Japan) Tochigi SC) |
| 10 | MF | JPN | Taro Sugimoto (to (Japan) Kashima Antlers, end of loan) |
| 13 | FW | JPN | Hiroto Goya (to (Japan) Gamba Osaka, end of loan) |
| 15 | DF | JPN | Rikuya Izutsu (to (Japan) Criacao Shinjuku) |
| 20 | DF | KOR | Kim Jong-pil (to (South Korea) Gyeongnam FC) |
| 22 | DF | JPN | Rikuto Hirose (to (Japan) Yokohama F. Marinos) |
| 23 | MF | JPN | Taiga Maekawa (to (Japan) Cerezo Osaka, end of loan) |
| 28 | DF | JPN | Tsubasa Oya (to (Japan) Gainare Tottori) |
| 29 | FW | ESP | David Barral (to (Spain) Racing Santander) |
| 30 | FW | JPN | Kiyoshiro Tsuboi (on loan to (Japan) Blaublitz Akita) |
| 50 | FW | NGR | Peter Utaka (to (Japan) Ventforet Kofu) |
| — | MF | JPN | Chie Edoojon Kawakami (on loan to (Japan) SC Sagamihara) |
| — | FW | JPN | Takuma Sonoda (to (Japan) Kagoshima United FC, previously on loan) |

=== Montedio Yamagata ===
In: Note: Flags indicate national team as defined under FIFA eligibility rules; some limited exceptions apply. Players may hold more than one non-FIFA nationality.

| No. | Pos. | Nation | Player |
|---|---|---|---|
| 7 | MF | JPN | Kenya Okazaki (from (Japan) Tochigi SC) |
| 9 | FW | BRA | Jefferson Baiano (on loan from (Brazil) Santa Rita) |
| 10 | MF | JPN | Haruya Ide (from (Japan) Gamba Osaka) |
| 13 | FW | JPN | Shuhei Otsuki (from (Japan) Vissel Kobe) |
| 20 | MF | JPN | Issei Takahashi (on loan from (Japan) JEF United Chiba) |
| 25 | MF | JPN | Rui Sueyoshi (from Osaka University of Health & Sport Sciences) |
| 26 | FW | JPN | Ayumu Nagato (from (Japan) Thespakusatsu Gunma, end of loan) |
| 27 | MF | JPN | Tatsuhiro Sakamoto (from Toyo University) |
| 29 | DF | BRA | Rodolfo (from (Brazil) Metropolitano) |
| 30 | GK | JPN | Akihiro Sato (from (Japan) Roasso Kumamoto) |
| 32 | GK | JPN | Ryusuke Otomo (promoted from youth ranks) |
| 36 | DF | JPN | Takahiro Yanagi (on loan from (Japan) FC Tokyo) |
| — | MF | JPN | Koki Kazama (from (Japan) Thespakusatsu Gunma, end of loan) |

Out: Note: Flags indicate national team as defined under FIFA eligibility rules; some limited exceptions apply. Players may hold more than one non-FIFA nationality.

| No. | Pos. | Nation | Player |
|---|---|---|---|
| 1 | GK | JPN | Tsuyoshi Kodama (to (Japan) FC Tokyo) |
| 6 | DF | BRA | Jairo Rodrigues (to (Indonesia) Persela Lamongan) |
| 7 | MF | JPN | Ryosuke Matsuoka (to (Japan) Fujieda MYFC) |
| 9 | FW | BRA | Felipe Alves (released) |
| 16 | MF | JPN | Seigo Kobayashi (to (Japan) Vissel Kobe, end of loan) |
| 20 | MF | JPN | Kaito Anzai (to (Japan) Kashiwa Reysol, end of loan) |
| 22 | FW | JPN | Shunta Nakamura (on loan to (Japan) Thespakusatsu Gunma) |
| 25 | MF | JPN | Koya Yuruki (to (Japan) Urawa Red Diamonds) |
| 29 | MF | KOR | Koo Bon-hyeok (released) |
| 33 | DF | JPN | Ryoma Nishimura (to (Japan) Albirex Niigata, end of loan) |
| 39 | FW | JPN | Masato Nakayama (to (Japan) Júbilo Iwata) |
| 40 | GK | JPN | Kotaro Iba (to (Japan) Iwate Grulla Morioka) |
| 42 | MF | JPN | Jumpei Kusukami (to (Japan) Shimizu S-Pulse, end of loan) |
| 49 | DF | JPN | Kenta Uchida (to (Japan) Nagoya Grampus, end of loan) |
| 50 | FW | BRA | Bruno Lopes (released) |
| — | DF | JPN | Haruki Takahashi (on loan to Albirex Niigata Singapore) |
| — | MF | JPN | Koki Kazama (to (Japan) FC Ryukyu) |

=== Zweigen Kanazawa ===
In: Note: Flags indicate national team as defined under FIFA eligibility rules; some limited exceptions apply. Players may hold more than one non-FIFA nationality.

| No. | Pos. | Nation | Player |
|---|---|---|---|
| 1 | GK | JPN | Masaaki Goto (on loan from (Japan) Shonan Bellmare) |
| 4 | DF | JPN | Ryoga Ishio (from (Japan) Cerezo Osaka) |
| 8 | MF | JPN | Keita Fujimura (from (Japan) Vegalta Sendai, previously on loan) |
| 9 | FW | JPN | Ren Komatsu (on loan from (Japan) Matsumoto Yamaga) |
| 13 | FW | JPN | Ryuhei Oishi (from Kokushikan University) |
| 18 | FW | JPN | Ryo Kubota (from Seiritsu Gakuen High School) |
| 21 | GK | JPN | Yoshiaki Arai (on loan from (Japan) Shimizu S-Pulse) |
| 22 | FW | CRC | Giovanni Clunie (from (Costa Rica) C.S. Cartaginés) |
| 24 | DF | JPN | Takumi Hasegawa (on loan from (Japan) Albirex Niigata) |
| 25 | DF | JPN | Masaya Kojima (on loan from (Japan) Vegalta Sendai) |
| — | DF | JPN | Tatsushi Koyanagi (from (Japan) Thespakusatsu Gunma, end of loan) |
| — | FW | JPN | Masato Yamazaki (from (Japan) Thespakusatsu Gunma, end of loan) |

Out: Note: Flags indicate national team as defined under FIFA eligibility rules; some limited exceptions apply. Players may hold more than one non-FIFA nationality.

| No. | Pos. | Nation | Player |
|---|---|---|---|
| 1 | GK | JPN | Naoki Harada (to (Japan) Vonds Ichihara) |
| 8 | MF | JPN | Kenta Yamafuji (to (Japan) Honda FC) |
| 9 | FW | JPN | Koichi Sato (to (Japan) Ventforet Kofu) |
| 10 | MF | JPN | Kiwara Miyazaki (to (Japan) Albirex Niigata, end of loan) |
| 13 | DF | JPN | Ryoma Ishida (to (Japan) Júbilo Iwata, end of loan) |
| 18 | DF | JPN | Koji Noda (to (Japan) ReinMeer Aomori) |
| 22 | GK | JPN | Ken Tajiri (to (Japan) Gamba Osaka, end of loan) |
| 25 | FW | JPN | Ryoya Taniguchi (on loan to Japan Soccer College) |
| 29 | FW | BRA | Rodrigo Maranhão (to (South Korea) Bucheon FC 1995) |
| 39 | DF | JPN | Honoya Shoji (to (Japan) Cerezo Osaka, end of loan) |
| — | DF | JPN | Tatsushi Koyanagi (to (Japan) Ventforet Kofu) |
| — | DF | JPN | Kodai Enomoto (on loan to (Japan) Vonds Ichihara) |
| — | FW | JPN | Masato Yamazaki (retired) |

=== JEF United Chiba ===
In: Note: Flags indicate national team as defined under FIFA eligibility rules; some limited exceptions apply. Players may hold more than one non-FIFA nationality.

| No. | Pos. | Nation | Player |
|---|---|---|---|
| 1 | GK | JPN | Ryota Suzuki (on loan from (Japan) Gamba Osaka) |
| 3 | DF | VEN | Williams Velásquez (on loan from (Japan) Watford) |
| 6 | MF | JPN | Yusuke Tasaka (from (Japan) Kawasaki Frontale) |
| 8 | MF | JPN | Yuki Horigome (from (Japan) Ventforet Kofu) |
| 9 | FW | BRA | Kléber (on loan from (Portugal) Estoril) |
| 11 | FW | JPN | Hisato Sato (from (Japan) Nagoya Grampus) |
| 17 | DF | JPN | Ikki Arai (on loan from (Japan) Nagoya Grampus) |
| 21 | FW | BRA | Alan Pinheiro (from (Japan) Tokyo Verdy) |
| 30 | GK | JPN | Peter Kwame Aizawa (from Nihon Bunri High School) |
| 49 | DF | JPN | Takumi Shimohira (from (Japan) Yokohama F. Marinos, previously on loan) |
| — | GK | JPN | Kaito Yamamoto (from (Japan) Yokohama FC, end of loan) |
| — | MF | JPN | Issei Takahashi (from (Japan) Renofa Yamaguchi, end of loan) |

Out: Note: Flags indicate national team as defined under FIFA eligibility rules; some limited exceptions apply. Players may hold more than one non-FIFA nationality.

| No. | Pos. | Nation | Player |
|---|---|---|---|
| 1 | GK | ARG | Diego Rodríguez (to (Argentina) Rosario Central, end of loan) |
| 3 | DF | JPN | Naoya Kondo (to (Japan) Tokyo Verdy) |
| 8 | MF | JPN | Koki Kiyotake (to (Japan) Tokushima Vortis) |
| 9 | FW | ARG | Joaquin Larrivey (to (Paraguay) Cerro Porteno) |
| 10 | MF | JPN | Yamato Machida (to (Japan) Matsumoto Yamaga) |
| 15 | DF | JPN | Yushi Mizobuchi (on loan to (Japan) Matsumoto Yamaga) |
| 21 | MF | PAR | Jorge Salinas (released) |
| 32 | DF | JPN | Danto Sugiyama (on loan to (Japan) Kataller Toyama) |
| 50 | FW | JPN | Hiroshi Ibusuki (to (Japan) Shonan Bellmare) |
| — | GK | JPN | Kaito Yamamoto (to (Japan) Roasso Kumamoto) |
| — | GK | JPN | Toru Takizawa (to (Japan) Shimizu S-Pulse, end of loan) |
| — | MF | JPN | Issei Takahashi (on loan to (Japan) Montedio Yamagata) |

=== Fagiano Okayama ===
In: Note: Flags indicate national team as defined under FIFA eligibility rules; some limited exceptions apply. Players may hold more than one non-FIFA nationality.

| No. | Pos. | Nation | Player |
|---|---|---|---|
| 2 | DF | JPN | Yuma Hiroki (from (Japan) Renofa Yamaguchi) |
| 8 | DF | JPN | Yusuke Tanaka (from (Japan) Cerezo Osaka) |
| 10 | FW | BRA | Léo Mineiro (from (Japan) Avispa Fukuoka) |
| 23 | FW | JPN | Shunnosuke Matsuki (from Keio University) |
| 25 | MF | JPN | Kazune Kubota (on loan from (Japan) Kashima Antlers) |
| 28 | FW | MAS | Hadi Fayyadh (from (Malaysia) Johor Darul Ta'zim II) |
| 35 | MF | BRA | Dener (from (Brazil) Vila Nova) |
| — | GK | JPN | Kota Nitadori (from (Japan) Roasso Kumamoto, end of loan) |

Out: Note: Flags indicate national team as defined under FIFA eligibility rules; some limited exceptions apply. Players may hold more than one non-FIFA nationality.

| No. | Pos. | Nation | Player |
|---|---|---|---|
| 2 | MF | JPN | Masahiko Sawaguchi (to (Japan) Ococias Kyoto AC) |
| 7 | MF | JPN | Daisuke Ito (to (Japan) SC Sagamihara) |
| 8 | MF | JPN | Koki Tsukagawa (to (Japan) Matsumoto Yamaga) |
| 10 | MF | JPN | Yohei Otake (to (Japan) V-Varen Nagasaki) |
| 15 | MF | JPN | Toshiya Sueyoshi (to (Japan) SC Sagamihara) |
| 16 | FW | BRA | Ricardo Santos (to (Thailand) Chainat Hornbill) |
| 23 | DF | JPN | Tsubasa Kubo (retired) |
| 37 | MF | KOR | Jeong Chung-geun (to (Japan) Yokohama FC, end of loan) |
| 39 | DF | JPN | Soya Takahashi (to (Japan) Sanfrecce Hiroshima, end of loan) |
| — | GK | JPN | Kota Nitadori (to (Japan) Iwaki FC) |
| — | MF | JPN | Kento Kato (to (Japan) Thespakusatsu Gunma) |
| — | FW | JPN | Yoshiki Fujimoto (to (Japan) Ehime FC, previously on loan) |

=== Albirex Niigata ===
In: Note: Flags indicate national team as defined under FIFA eligibility rules; some limited exceptions apply. Players may hold more than one non-FIFA nationality.

| No. | Pos. | Nation | Player |
|---|---|---|---|
| — | DF | JPN | Takumi Hasegawa (from (Japan) Thespakusatsu Gunma, end of loan) |
| 3 | DF | BRA | Paulão (from (Japan) Tochigi SC) |
| 7 | MF | BRA | Samuel Santos (from (Brazil) Figueirense FC) |
| 8 | MF | BRA | Silvinho (from (Brazil) CA Penapolense) |
| 9 | FW | BRA | Leonardo (from (Japan) Gainare Tottori) |
| 13 | FW | BRA | Valmir Francis (from (Portugal) Vitória Guimarães) |
| 17 | MF | BRA | Cauê (from (Japan) Omiya Ardija, previously on loan) |
| 20 | MF | JPN | Shion Homma (promoted from youth ranks) |
| 21 | GK | JPN | Yosuke Nozawa (from Albirex Niigata Singapore) |
| 22 | FW | JPN | Shunsuke Mori (from (Japan) Tokyo Verdy, end of loan) |
| 25 | MF | JPN | Hiroki Akiyama (from Maebashi Ikuei High School) |
| 35 | DF | JPN | Shosei Okamoto (promoted from youth ranks) |
| 37 | FW | JPN | Shu Hiramatsu (from (Japan) V-Varen Nagasaki, end of loan) |
| 38 | MF | JPN | Cho Young-cheol (from (South Korea) Gyeongnam FC) |
| 41 | GK | JPN | Kazuki Fujita (promoted from youth ranks) |
| — | DF | JPN | Ryoma Nishimura (from (Japan) Montedio Yamagata, end of loan) |
| — | MF | JPN | Go Hayama (from (Japan) Tochigi SC, end of loan) |
| — | MF | JPN | Kiwara Miyazaki (from (Japan) Zweigen Kanazawa, end of loan) |
| — | FW | BRA | Bruno Meneghel (from (Japan) Yokohama FC, end of loan) |

Out: Note: Flags indicate national team as defined under FIFA eligibility rules; some limited exceptions apply. Players may hold more than one non-FIFA nationality.

| No. | Pos. | Nation | Player |
|---|---|---|---|
| 3 | DF | JPN | Michihiro Yasuda (released) |
| 4 | DF | KOR | Song Ju-hun (released) |
| 5 | DF | JPN | Seitaro Tomisawa (to (Japan) SC Sagamihara) |
| 7 | FW | BRA | Jonathan Reis (released) |
| 9 | FW | JPN | Atsushi Kawata (to (Japan) Tokushima Vortis) |
| 11 | FW | BRA | Thalles (to (Brazil) Vasco da Gama, end of loan) |
| 13 | MF | JPN | Yohei Kajiyama (to (Japan) FC Tokyo, end of loan) |
| 17 | MF | JPN | Yuta Ito (released) |
| 23 | FW | BRA | Bruno Meneghel (released) |
| 34 | MF | JPN | Teruki Hara (to (Japan) Sagan Tosu) |
| 38 | GK | BRA | Alex Muralha (to (Brazil) Flamengo, end of loan) |
| 50 | MF | JPN | Daisuke Sakai (to (Japan) Oita Trinita, end of loan) |
| — | GK | JPN | Yasuhiro Watanabe (to (Japan) Blaublitz Akita) |
| — | DF | JPN | Ryoma Nishimura (to (Japan) Veertien Mie) |
| — | DF | JPN | Takumi Hasegawa (on loan to (Japan) Zweigen Kanazawa) |
| — | MF | JPN | Go Hayama (to (Japan) Machida Zelvia) |
| — | MF | JPN | Kiwara Miyazaki (to (Japan) FC Tokyo) |

=== Tochigi SC ===
In: Note: Flags indicate national team as defined under FIFA eligibility rules; some limited exceptions apply. Players may hold more than one non-FIFA nationality.

| No. | Pos. | Nation | Player |
|---|---|---|---|
| 2 | DF | JPN | Ryuji Ito (from (Japan) Vonds Ichihara) |
| 3 | DF | BRA | Jonas (from (Brazil) EC Bahia) |
| 4 | DF | JPN | Kotaro Fujiwara (from (Japan) Tokushima Vortis) |
| 9 | FW | JPN | Masashi Oguro (from (Japan) Kyoto Sanga, previously on loan) |
| 11 | MF | JPN | Tasuku Hiraoka (from (Japan) FC Tokyo) |
| 13 | FW | BRA | Vinicius (from (Brazil) EC Vitoria) |
| 15 | DF | JPN | Reiya Morishita (on loan from (Japan) Cerezo Osaka) |
| 17 | MF | JPN | Ren Yamamoto (from (Japan) Blancdieu Hirosaki, end of loan) |
| 19 | FW | JPN | Koki Oshima (from (Japan) Thespakusatsu Gunma, end of loan) |
| 20 | MF | JPN | Yudai Iwama (from (Japan) Matsumoto Yamaga) |
| 21 | MF | JPN | Junya Osaki (from (Japan) Renofa Yamaguchi) |
| 26 | MF | JPN | Takuma Edamura (from (Japan) Shimizu S-Pulse) |
| 32 | MF | JPN | Shuga Arai (from (Japan) Blancdieu Hirosaki, end of loan) |
| 33 | DF | JPN | Hayato Kurosaki (from Hosei University) |
| 34 | FW | JPN | Tatsumi Sotome (from (Japan) Blancdieu Hirosaki, end of loan) |
| 41 | FW | JPN | Ryuta Honjo (from (Japan) Blancdieu Hirosaki, end of loan) |
| 50 | GK | KOR | Yoo Hyun (from (South Korea) FC Seoul) |
| — | DF | JPN | Seiji Kawakami (from (Japan) Fujieda MYFC, end of loan) |
| — | MF | JPN | Ren Sengoku (from (Japan) Gainare Tottori, end of loan) |

Out: Note: Flags indicate national team as defined under FIFA eligibility rules; some limited exceptions apply. Players may hold more than one non-FIFA nationality.

| No. | Pos. | Nation | Player |
|---|---|---|---|
| 1 | GK | JPN | Akihiko Takeshige (to (Japan) Yokohama FC) |
| 2 | MF | JPN | Yoshiya Nishizawa (to (Japan) Okinawa SV) |
| 3 | DF | JPN | Shogo Nishikawa (to (Japan) Yokohama FC, end of loan) |
| 10 | MF | JPN | Makoto Sugimoto (to (Japan) Vonds Ichihara) |
| 11 | MF | JPN | Kenya Okazaki (to (Japan) Montedio Yamagata) |
| 13 | FW | JPN | Yosuke Kamigata (to (Japan) Vanraure Hachinohe) |
| 17 | DF | JPN | Shota Fukuoka (to (Japan) Tokushima Vortis) |
| 15 | GK | SUI | Johnny Leoni (released) |
| 19 | DF | JPN | Kohei Hattori (to (Japan) Matsumoto Yamaga) |
| 20 | MF | JPN | Go Hayama (to (Japan) Albirex Niigata, end of loan) |
| 26 | DF | JPN | Ryosuke Tada (released) |
| 38 | MF | JPN | Taisuke Miyazaki (to (Japan) Vanraure Hachinohe) |
| 42 | DF | BRA | Paulão (to (Japan) Albirex Niigata) |
| 44 | DF | JPN | Kensuke Fukuda (from (Japan) V-Varen Nagasaki) |
| 50 | MF | JPN | Takahiro Futagawa (to (Japan) Gamba Osaka, end of loan) |
| — | DF | JPN | Seiji Kawakami (on loan to (Japan) SC Sagamihara) |
| — | MF | JPN | Taku Ushinohama (to (Japan) Kagoshima United FC, previously on loan) |
| — | MF | JPN | Ren Sengoku (released) |

=== Ehime FC ===
In: Note: Flags indicate national team as defined under FIFA eligibility rules; some limited exceptions apply. Players may hold more than one non-FIFA nationality.

| No. | Pos. | Nation | Player |
|---|---|---|---|
| 8 | MF | JPN | Yoichi Naganuma (on loan from (Japan) Sanfrecce Hiroshima) |
| 13 | MF | JPN | Shuya Iwai (promoted from youth ranks) |
| 19 | FW | JPN | Yoshiki Fujimoto (from (Japan) Fagiano Okayama, previously on loan) |
| 26 | MF | JPN | Sota Watanabe (promoted from youth ranks) |
| 27 | FW | JPN | Hiroto Nakagawa (from Kokoku High School) |
| 28 | MF | JPN | Sasuga Kiyokawa (from Biwako Seikei Sport College) |
| 29 | MF | JPN | Takumu Kawamura (on loan from (Japan) Sanfrecce Hiroshima) |
| 30 | MF | KOR | Woo Sang-ho (from (Japan) FC Gifu, previously on loan) |
| 33 | MF | JPN | Koji Yamase (from (Japan) Avispa Fukuoka) |
| 39 | DF | JPN | Yota Shimokawa (on loan from (Japan) Matsumoto Yamaga) |
| — | DF | JPN | Shuhei Hotta (from (Japan) Blaublitz Akita, end of loan) |

Out: Note: Flags indicate national team as defined under FIFA eligibility rules; some limited exceptions apply. Players may hold more than one non-FIFA nationality.

| No. | Pos. | Nation | Player |
|---|---|---|---|
| 8 | DF | JPN | Jun Ando (to (Japan) Kyoto Sanga) |
| 24 | DF | JPN | Jurato Ikeda (on loan to (Japan) Nagano Parceiro) |
| 26 | FW | JPN | Shinya Uehara (to (Japan) FC Ryukyu) |
| 41 | MF | JPN | Junki Koike (to (Japan) Tokyo Verdy) |
| — | DF | JPN | Shuhei Hotta (to (Japan) Nara Club) |

=== Kyoto Sanga ===
In: Note: Flags indicate national team as defined under FIFA eligibility rules; some limited exceptions apply. Players may hold more than one non-FIFA nationality.

| No. | Pos. | Nation | Player |
|---|---|---|---|
| 1 | GK | JPN | Nobuhiro Kato (from (Japan) Omiya Ardija) |
| 5 | DF | JPN | Kyohei Kuroki (from (Japan) Kagoshima United FC, previously on loan) |
| 7 | FW | BRA | Renan Mota (from (Brazil) Figueirense) |
| 10 | MF | JPN | Yoshihiro Shoji (from (Japan) Vegalta Sendai, previously on loan) |
| 13 | FW | JPN | Takumi Miyayoshi (from (Japan) Hokkaido Consadole Sapporo) |
| 16 | DF | JPN | Jun Ando (from (Japan) Ehime FC) |
| 20 | MF | BRA | Juninho (from (Japan) FC Osaka, previously on loan) |
| 23 | FW | JPN | Kazunari Ichimi (on loan from (Japan) Gamba Osaka) |
| 25 | DF | JPN | Katsunori Ueebisu (from Meiji University) |
| 28 | DF | JPN | Kohei Tomita (from Waseda University) |
| 29 | MF | JPN | Katsuya Nakano (from Kwansei Gakuin University) |
| 31 | DF | JPN | Shimpei Fukuoka (promoted from youth ranks) |
| 32 | MF | JPN | Soichiro Kozuki (promoted from youth ranks) |
| 33 | FW | JPN | Kohei Hattori (promoted from youth ranks) |
| 35 | DF | JPN | Genki Egawa (promoted from youth ranks) |
| 39 | FW | JPN | Sergio Escudero (from (South Korea) Ulsan Hyundai, end of loan) |
| — | MF | JPN | Takuya Shimamura (from (Japan) FC Gifu, end of loan) |
| — | FW | JPN | Masatoshi Ishida (from (Japan) Azul Claro Numazu, end of loan) |

Out: Note: Flags indicate national team as defined under FIFA eligibility rules; some limited exceptions apply. Players may hold more than one non-FIFA nationality.

| No. | Pos. | Nation | Player |
|---|---|---|---|
| 7 | MF | JPN | Ryosuke Tamura (to (Japan) Fukushima United FC) |
| 13 | FW | JPN | Yuto Iwasaki (to (Japan) Hokkaido Consadole Sapporo) |
| 15 | DF | JPN | Yuta Someya (to (Japan) Kashiwa Reysol) |
| 20 | FW | BRA | Kaio (to (United Arab Emirates) Emirates Club) |
| 23 | MF | JPN | Goshi Okubo (to (Thailand) PTT Rayong FC, end of loan) |
| 33 | GK | JPN | Genki Yamada (to (Japan) Renofa Yamaguchi, previously on loan) |
| — | GK | KOR | Kim Chol-ho (on loan to (Japan) Thespakusatsu Gunma) |
| — | DF | KOR | Wo Shao-cong (to (Japan) Shimizu S-Pulse, end of loan) |
| — | MF | JPN | Kota Ogino (on loan to (Brazil) Londrina EC) |
| — | MF | JPN | Yushi Nagashima (to (Japan) FC Gifu, previously on loan) |
| — | MF | JPN | Takuya Shimamura (on loan to (Brazil) Londrina EC) |
| — | MF | JPN | Daiki Numa (to (Austria) SV Horn) |
| — | FW | JPN | Masatoshi Ishida (to (South Korea) Ansan Greeners FC) |
| — | FW | JPN | Masashi Oguro (to (Japan) Tochigi SC, previously on loan) |

=== FC Gifu ===
In: Note: Flags indicate national team as defined under FIFA eligibility rules; some limited exceptions apply. Players may hold more than one non-FIFA nationality.

| No. | Pos. | Nation | Player |
|---|---|---|---|
| 4 | DF | JPN | Kentaro Kai (from (Japan) Gainare Tottori, end of loan) |
| 5 | FW | JPN | Shota Kawanishi (on loan from (Japan) Oita Trinita) |
| 7 | FW | JPN | Toma Murata (from Kokoku High School) |
| 8 | FW | GAB | Frederic Bulot (from (France) Tours FC) |
| 11 | FW | JPN | Ryoichi Maeda (from (Japan) FC Tokyo) |
| 15 | DF | JPN | Yuki Aizu (from University of Tsukuba) |
| 16 | FW | JPN | Yuta Togashi (from (Japan) FC Ryukyu) |
| 22 | DF | JPN | Ko Yanagisawa (from Juntendo University) |
| 24 | FW | JPN | Shohei Aihara (from Kindai University) |
| 26 | MF | KOR | Ham Young-joon (from Open Cyber University) |
| 28 | MF | JPN | Yushi Nagashima (from (Japan) Kyoto Sanga, previously on loan) |
| 34 | DF | JPN | Fumitaka Kitatani (from (Japan) V-Varen Nagasaki, previously on loan) |
| 35 | MF | JPN | Hayate Nagakura (from Hosei University) |
| 36 | DF | JPN | Jefferson Tabinas (on loan from (Japan) Kawasaki Frontale) |
| 43 | MF | GER | Jan-Ole Sievers (on loan from (Germany) 1. FC Kaiserslautern) |

Out: Note: Flags indicate national team as defined under FIFA eligibility rules; some limited exceptions apply. Players may hold more than one non-FIFA nationality.

| No. | Pos. | Nation | Player |
|---|---|---|---|
| 5 | DF | JPN | Tsubasa Aoki (on loan to (Japan) Thespakusatsu Gunma) |
| 7 | MF | JPN | Paulo Junichi Tanaka (to (Japan) Renofa Yamaguchi) |
| 8 | MF | ARG | Ezequiel Ham (to (Argentina) Argentinos Juniors, end of loan) |
| 15 | DF | JPN | Daiki Tamori (retired) |
| 19 | FW | JPN | Kento Yabuuchi (on loan to (Japan) Iwate Grulla Morioka) |
| 22 | MF | JPN | Takuya Shimamura (to (Japan) Kyoto Sanga, end of loan) |
| 24 | FW | JPN | Hiroaki Namba (retired) |
| 26 | MF | JPN | Yoichi Naganuma (to (Japan) Sanfrecce Hiroshima, end of loan) |
| — | DF | JPN | Takayuki Nakamura (to (Japan) Gainare Tottori) |
| — | MF | KOR | Jeon San-hae (on loan to (Japan) Suzuka Unlimited FC) |
| — | MF | KOR | Woo Sang-ho (to (Japan) Ehime FC, previously on loan) |

=== FC Ryukyu ===
In: Note: Flags indicate national team as defined under FIFA eligibility rules; some limited exceptions apply. Players may hold more than one non-FIFA nationality.

| No. | Pos. | Nation | Player |
|---|---|---|---|
| 1 | GK | CRC | Danny Carvajal (from (Japan) Mito HollyHock) |
| 4 | DF | JPN | Ryohei Okazaki (from (Japan) Shonan Bellmare) |
| 6 | MF | JPN | Koki Kazama (from (Japan) Montedio Yamagata) |
| 9 | FW | JPN | Koji Suzuki (from (Japan) Machida Zelvia) |
| 11 | MF | JPN | Keita Tanaka (from (Japan) Mito HollyHock) |
| 13 | MF | JPN | Shuto Kawai (from (Japan) Nagano Parceiro) |
| 16 | DF | JPN | Jumpei Arai (from (Japan) Yokohama FC) |
| 19 | MF | JPN | Ryosuke Ochi (from (Japan) Fujieda MYFC) |
| 20 | MF | JPN | Kazumasa Uesato (from (Japan) Roasso Kumamoto) |
| 21 | FW | JPN | Shinya Uehara (from (Japan) Ehime FC) |
| 22 | FW | JPN | Yukihide Gibo (from Okinawa International University) |
| 23 | GK | JPN | Ryo Ishii (on loan from (Japan) Mito HollyHock) |
| 28 | MF | JPN | Yoshio Koizumi (from Aoyama Gakuin University) |
| 30 | DF | JPN | Shogo Nishikawa (from (Japan) Yokohama FC) |
| 31 | GK | JPN | Kosuke Inose (from Ryutsu Keizai University Kashiwa High School) |
| 33 | DF | JPN | Ryoji Fukui (from (Japan) Mito HollyHock) |
| 35 | DF | JPN | Minoru Hanafusa (from Kokushikan University) |
| — | DF | JPN | Kenta Naito (from Chuo University) |

Out: Note: Flags indicate national team as defined under FIFA eligibility rules; some limited exceptions apply. Players may hold more than one non-FIFA nationality.

| No. | Pos. | Nation | Player |
|---|---|---|---|
| 1 | GK | PRK | Park Iru-gyu (to (Japan) Yokohama F. Marinos) |
| 4 | MF | JPN | Yutaro Chinen (released) |
| 6 | MF | JPN | Masayoshi Takayanagi (to (Japan) Okinawa SV) |
| 7 | MF | JPN | Park Ri-ki (to (Japan) Kochi United SC) |
| 9 | FW | JPN | Yuta Togashi (to (Japan) FC Gifu) |
| 11 | FW | JPN | Ryūji Bando (released) |
| 16 | MF | JPN | Yuichiro Edamoto (to (Japan) Kagoshima United FC) |
| 21 | GK | JPN | Keisuke Ono (released) |
| 22 | DF | JPN | Shuhei Takizawa (to (Japan) Mito HollyHock) |
| 23 | DF | JPN | Daichi Okumiya (retired) |
| 24 | DF | JPN | Mikihito Arai (to (Japan) Tokyo United FC) |
| — | DF | KOR | Kim Hyun-beom (released) |
| — | MF | KOR | Choe Byeong-gil (released) |
| — | MF | JPN | Tatsuya Mochizuki (released) |

=== Kagoshima United FC ===
In: Note: Flags indicate national team as defined under FIFA eligibility rules; some limited exceptions apply. Players may hold more than one non-FIFA nationality.

| No. | Pos. | Nation | Player |
|---|---|---|---|
| 4 | DF | BRA | Willian Magrão (from (Japan) Oita Trinita) |
| 9 | FW | JPN | Takuma Sonoda (from (Japan) Tokushima Vortis, previously on loan) |
| 10 | FW | JPN | Rei Yonezawa (from (Japan) Cerezo Osaka) |
| 16 | MF | JPN | Yuichiro Edamoto (from (Japan) FC Ryukyu) |
| 19 | DF | JPN | Shunsuke Tsutsumi (from (Japan) Avispa Fukuoka) |
| 20 | DF | JPN | Noriyuki Sakemoto (from (Japan) Cerezo Osaka) |
| 21 | MF | JPN | Kohei Hattanda (from (Japan) Nagoya Grampus) |
| 24 | DF | JPN | Kazuya Sunamori (from (Japan) Azul Claro Numazu) |
| 28 | FW | PRK | Han Yong-thae (on loan from (Japan) Matsumoto Yamaga) |
| 31 | GK | JPN | Shogo Onishi (from (Japan) Azul Claro Numazu) |
| 32 | MF | JPN | Taku Ushinohama (from (Japan) Tochigi SC, previously on loan) |
| 40 | MF | JPN | Hiroya Nodake (promoted from youth ranks) |

Out: Note: Flags indicate national team as defined under FIFA eligibility rules; some limited exceptions apply. Players may hold more than one non-FIFA nationality.

| No. | Pos. | Nation | Player |
|---|---|---|---|
| 16 | FW | JPN | Yuma Kawamori (on loan to (Japan) Azul Claro Numazu) |
| 20 | FW | JPN | Yuki Nakayama (to (Japan) Yokohama FC, end of loan) |
| 21 | GK | JPN | Kazusa Iwasaki (on loan to (Japan) FC Maruyasu Okazaki) |
| 24 | MF | JPN | Toshihiro Matsushita (retired) |
| 25 | MF | JPN | Shota Kadono (released) |
| 28 | DF | JPN | Masafumi Terada (on loan to (Japan) Veertien Mie) |
| — | DF | JPN | Kaito Kimura (released) |
| — | DF | JPN | Kyohei Kuroki (to (Japan) Kyoto Sanga, previously on loan) |
