= List of J2 League football transfers summer 2018 =

This is a list of Japanese football J1 League transfers in the summer transfer window 2018 by club.

== Ventforet Kofu ==
In: Note: Flags indicate national team as defined under FIFA eligibility rules; some limited exceptions apply. Players may hold more than one non-FIFA nationality.

No.	Pos.	Nation	Player
11	FW	BRA	Diego (on loan from (Brazil) Internacional)
15	MF	BRA	Ferrugem (from (Brazil) Centro Sportivo Alagoano)
30	DF	JPN	Kohei Shimizu (on loan from (Japan) Shimizu S-Pulse)
44	MF	JPN	Takayuki Seto (from (Romania) Astra Giurgiu)

Out: Note: Flags indicate national team as defined under FIFA eligibility rules; some limited exceptions apply. Players may hold more than one non-FIFA nationality.

No.	Pos.	Nation	Player
9	FW	BRA	Dinei (to (Japan) Matsumoto Yamaga)
10	FW	BRA	Lins (on loan to (Japan) FC Tokyo)

== Albirex Niigata ==
In: Note: Flags indicate national team as defined under FIFA eligibility rules; some limited exceptions apply. Players may hold more than one non-FIFA nationality.

No.	Pos.	Nation	Player
7	FW	BRA	Jonathan Reis (from (Japan) Consadole Sapporo)
13	MF	JPN	Yohei Kajiyama (on loan from (Japan) FC Tokyo)
18	MF	JPN	Ryoma Watanabe (from (Germany) FC Ingolstadt 04)
32	MF	BRA	Cauê (on loan from (Japan) Omiya Ardija)

Out: Note: Flags indicate national team as defined under FIFA eligibility rules; some limited exceptions apply. Players may hold more than one non-FIFA nationality.

No.	Pos.	Nation	Player
6	MF	JPN	Ryota Isomura (to (Japan) V-Varen Nagasaki)
7	FW	BRA	Rony (to (Brazil) Atlético Paranaense)
20	MF	JPN	Go Hayama (on loan to (Japan) Tochigi SC)
21	GK	JPN	Yasuhiro Watanabe (on loan to (Japan) Vonds Ichihara)
25	DF	JPN	Takumi Hasegawa (on loan to (Japan) Thespakusatsu Gunma)
27	FW	BRA	Bruno Meneghel (to (Japan) Yokohama FC)

== Omiya Ardija ==
In: Note: Flags indicate national team as defined under FIFA eligibility rules; some limited exceptions apply. Players may hold more than one non-FIFA nationality.

No.	Pos.	Nation	Player
24	MF	MKD	David Babunski (from (Japan) Yokohama F. Marinos)
50	DF	JPN	Hiroto Hatao (on loan from (Japan) Nagoya Grampus)

Out: Note: Flags indicate national team as defined under FIFA eligibility rules; some limited exceptions apply. Players may hold more than one non-FIFA nationality.

No.	Pos.	Nation	Player
18	MF	BRA	Cauê (on loan to (Japan) Albirex Niigata)

== Avispa Fukuoka ==
In: Note: Flags indicate national team as defined under FIFA eligibility rules; some limited exceptions apply. Players may hold more than one non-FIFA nationality.

No.	Pos.	Nation	Player
26	DF	JPN	Taiyo Koga (on loan from (Japan) Kashiwa Reysol)
29	DF	JPN	Kazunori Yoshimoto (on loan from (Japan) FC Tokyo)
35	FW	BRA	Léo Mineiro (from (Brazil) Coimbra EC)

Out: Note: Flags indicate national team as defined under FIFA eligibility rules; some limited exceptions apply. Players may hold more than one non-FIFA nationality.

No.	Pos.	Nation	Player
4	DF	JPN	Yu Tamura (to (Japan) Montedio Yamagata)
9	FW	BRA	Tulio De Melo (released)
20	FW	BRA	Euller (released)

== Tokyo Verdy ==
In: Note: Flags indicate national team as defined under FIFA eligibility rules; some limited exceptions apply. Players may hold more than one non-FIFA nationality.

No.	Pos.	Nation	Player
4	DF	JPN	Yuki Kagawa (on loan from (Japan) V-Varen Nagasaki)
6	MF	JPN	Jin Izumisawa (on loan from (Japan) Gamba Osaka)
10	FW	BRA	Leandro (from (Japan) Vissel Kobe)

Out: Note: Flags indicate national team as defined under FIFA eligibility rules; some limited exceptions apply. Players may hold more than one non-FIFA nationality.

No.	Pos.	Nation	Player
4	DF	JPN	Shinnosuke Hatanaka (to (Japan) Yokohama F. Marinos)
14	MF	JPN	Naoto Sawai (on loan to (France) AC Ajaccio)
22	FW	ESP	Carlos Martínez (to (Spain) Hércules CF)
26	FW	JPN	Kazuma Takai (to (Japan) Renofa Yamaguchi)

== JEF United Chiba ==
In: Note: Flags indicate national team as defined under FIFA eligibility rules; some limited exceptions apply. Players may hold more than one non-FIFA nationality.

No.	Pos.	Nation	Player
22	MF	JPN	Kohei Kudo (from (Japan) Matsumoto Yamaga)
49	DF	JPN	Takumi Shimohira (on loan from (Japan) Yokohama F. Marinos)

Out: Note: Flags indicate national team as defined under FIFA eligibility rules; some limited exceptions apply. Players may hold more than one non-FIFA nationality.

No.	Pos.	Nation	Player
26	DF	JPN	Jun Okano (on loan to (Japan) Oita Trinita)
27	DF	JPN	Toshiya Takagi (to (Japan) Kashiwa Reysol)

== Tokushima Vortis ==
In: Note: Flags indicate national team as defined under FIFA eligibility rules; some limited exceptions apply. Players may hold more than one non-FIFA nationality.

No.	Pos.	Nation	Player
1	GK	JPN	Taku Akahoshi (on loan from (Japan) Sagan Tosu)
26	FW	ESP	David Barral (from (Spain) Cádiz CF)
36	FW	JPN	Genta Omotehara (on loan from (Japan) Shonan Bellmare)
40	GK	JPN	Kenshin Yoshimaru (on loan from (Japan) Vissel Kobe)
47	FW	JPN	Yuki Oshitani (from (Japan) Nagoya Grampus)
50	FW	NGR	Peter Utaka (from (Denmark) Vejle Boldklub)

Out: Note: Flags indicate national team as defined under FIFA eligibility rules; some limited exceptions apply. Players may hold more than one non-FIFA nationality.

No.	Pos.	Nation	Player
1	GK	CRC	Danny Carvajal (back to (Spain) Albacete, end of loan)
3	DF	JPN	Leo Osaki (to (Japan) Vissel Kobe)
9	FW	BRA	Nathan Júnior (released)
11	MF	JPN	Yatsunori Shimaya (to (Japan) Sagan Tosu)
17	FW	JPN	Ryogo Yamasaki (to (Japan) Shonan Bellmare)
19	FW	JPN	Takuma Sonoda (on loan to (Japan) Kagoshima United FC)
27	DF	JPN	Yuki Omoto (to (Japan) V-Varen Nagasaki)
—	FW	ARG	Nicolás Orsini (to (Argentina) Club Atlético Sarmiento, back from loan from (Paraguay) Sportivo Luqueño)

== Matsumoto Yamaga ==
In: Note: Flags indicate national team as defined under FIFA eligibility rules; some limited exceptions apply. Players may hold more than one non-FIFA nationality.

No.	Pos.	Nation	Player
27	DF	SGP	Anders Aplin (on loan from (Singapore) Geylang International FC)
49	FW	BRA	Dinei (from (Japan) Ventforet Kofu)
50	DF	JPN	Tomoki Imai (from (Japan) Kashiwa Reysol)

Out: Note: Flags indicate national team as defined under FIFA eligibility rules; some limited exceptions apply. Players may hold more than one non-FIFA nationality.

No.	Pos.	Nation	Player
10	MF	JPN	Kohei Kudo (to (Japan) JEF United Chiba)
25	MF	JPN	Naoki Maeda (to (Japan) Nagoya Grampus)
35	DF	JPN	Daiki Morimoto (on loan to (Japan) SC Sagamihara)

== Oita Trinita ==
In: Note: Flags indicate national team as defined under FIFA eligibility rules; some limited exceptions apply. Players may hold more than one non-FIFA nationality.

No.	Pos.	Nation	Player
2	DF	BRA	Willian Magrão (from (Brazil) Red Bull Brasil)
16	DF	JPN	Jun Okano (on loan from (Japan) JEF United Chiba)

Out: Note: Flags indicate national team as defined under FIFA eligibility rules; some limited exceptions apply. Players may hold more than one non-FIFA nationality.

No.	Pos.	Nation	Player
4	DF	JPN	Akira Takeuchi (on loan to (Japan) Kamatamare Sanuki)
16	DF	KOR	Lim Seung-gyeom (to (Japan) Nagoya Grampus, end of loan)

== Yokohama FC ==
In: Note: Flags indicate national team as defined under FIFA eligibility rules; some limited exceptions apply. Players may hold more than one non-FIFA nationality.

No.	Pos.	Nation	Player
5	DF	JPN	Masakazu Tashiro (on loan from (Japan) V-Varen Nagasaki)
15	FW	JPN	Yuki Nakayama (on loan to (Japan) Kagoshima United FC)
23	FW	BRA	Bruno Meneghel (on loan from (Japan) Albirex Niigata)
39	FW	JPN	Yuji Senuma (from (Japan) Montedio Yamagata)
43	FW	JPN	Koki Saito (promoted from youth ranks)

Out: Note: Flags indicate national team as defined under FIFA eligibility rules; some limited exceptions apply. Players may hold more than one non-FIFA nationality.

No.	Pos.	Nation	Player
19	MF	KOR	Jeong Chung-geun (on loan to (Japan) Fagiano Okayama)

== Montedio Yamagata ==
In: Note: Flags indicate national team as defined under FIFA eligibility rules; some limited exceptions apply. Players may hold more than one non-FIFA nationality.

No.	Pos.	Nation	Player
38	DF	JPN	Yu Tamura (from (Japan) Avispa Fukuoka)
42	MF	JPN	Jumpei Kusukami (on loan from (Japan) Shimizu S-Pulse)
49	MF	JPN	Kenta Uchida (on loan from (Japan) Nagoya Grampus)
50	FW	BRA	Bruno Lopes (from (Malaysia) Kelantan)

Out: Note: Flags indicate national team as defined under FIFA eligibility rules; some limited exceptions apply. Players may hold more than one non-FIFA nationality.

No.	Pos.	Nation	Player
5	DF	JPN	Rikiya Motegi (to (Japan) Urawa Red Diamonds, end of loan)
10	FW	JPN	Yuji Senuma (to (Japan) Yokohama FC)

== Kyoto Sanga ==
In: Note: Flags indicate national team as defined under FIFA eligibility rules; some limited exceptions apply. Players may hold more than one non-FIFA nationality.

No.	Pos.	Nation	Player
20	FW	BRA	Kaio (from (China) Yunnan Flying Tigers)
23	FW	JPN	Goshi Okubo (on loan from (Thailand) PTT Rayong F.C.)
31	MF	BRA	Juninho (on loan from (Japan) FC Osaka)
37	DF	CHN	Wu Shao Cong (on loan from (Japan) Shimizu S-Pulse)
38	DF	JPN	Kyohei Kuroki (on loan from (Japan) Kagoshima United FC)
41	MF	JPN	Jun Kanakubo (from (Japan) Vegalta Sendai)
44	MF	JPN	Yoshihiro Shoji (on loan from (Japan) Vegalta Sendai)

Out: Note: Flags indicate national team as defined under FIFA eligibility rules; some limited exceptions apply. Players may hold more than one non-FIFA nationality.

No.	Pos.	Nation	Player
5	MF	URU	Matías Caseras (to (Uruguay) Plaza Colonia, end of loan)
10	FW	JPN	Sergio Escudero (on loan to (South Korea) Ulsan Hyundai)
16	FW	JPN	Daiki Numa (on loan to (Japan) Tegevajaro Miyazaki)
20	MF	BRA	Alexandre (to (Brazil) Metropolitano, end of loan)
25	MF	JPN	Kota Ogino (on loan to (Japan) Tegevajaro Miyazaki)

== Fagiano Okayama ==
In: Note: Flags indicate national team as defined under FIFA eligibility rules; some limited exceptions apply. Players may hold more than one non-FIFA nationality.

No.	Pos.	Nation	Player
37	MF	KOR	Jeong Chung-geun (on loan from (Japan) Yokohama FC)
39	DF	JPN	Soya Takahashi (on loan from (Japan) Sanfrecce Hiroshima)

Out: Note: Flags indicate national team as defined under FIFA eligibility rules; some limited exceptions apply. Players may hold more than one non-FIFA nationality.

No.	Pos.	Nation	Player
20	FW	JPN	Yoshiki Fujimoto (on loan to (Japan) Ehime FC)

== Mito HollyHock ==
In: Note: Flags indicate national team as defined under FIFA eligibility rules; some limited exceptions apply. Players may hold more than one non-FIFA nationality.

No.	Pos.	Nation	Player
27	MF	JPN	Shunsuke Motegi (on loan from (Japan) Vegalta Sendai)
29	GK	CRC	Danny Carvajal (from (Spain) Albacete)
30	GK	JPN	Ko Shimura (on loan from (Japan) Jubilo Iwata)
47	FW	BRA	Jô (on loan from (Brazil) Linense)

Out: Note: Flags indicate national team as defined under FIFA eligibility rules; some limited exceptions apply. Players may hold more than one non-FIFA nationality.

No.	Pos.	Nation	Player
23	MF	JPN	Ryo Toyama (on loan to (Japan) Blaublitz Akita)
30	GK	JPN	Ko Shimura (to (Japan) Jubilo Iwata, end of loan)
39	MF	JPN	Ryuya Motoda (on loan to (Japan) Vanraure Hachinohe)
40	GK	JPN	Yuto Koizumi (on loan to (Japan) Grulla Morioka)

== Ehime FC ==
In: Note: Flags indicate national team as defined under FIFA eligibility rules; some limited exceptions apply. Players may hold more than one non-FIFA nationality.

No.	Pos.	Nation	Player
19	FW	JPN	Yoshiki Fujimoto (on loan from (Japan) Fagiano Okayama)
30	MF	JPN	Woo Sang-ho (on loan from (Japan) FC Gifu)

Out: Note: Flags indicate national team as defined under FIFA eligibility rules; some limited exceptions apply. Players may hold more than one non-FIFA nationality.

No.	Pos.	Nation	Player

== Machida Zelvia ==
In: Note: Flags indicate national team as defined under FIFA eligibility rules; some limited exceptions apply. Players may hold more than one non-FIFA nationality.

No.	Pos.	Nation	Player
25	MF	JPN	Hirofumi Yamauchi (on loan from (Japan) Cerezo Osaka)

Out: Note: Flags indicate national team as defined under FIFA eligibility rules; some limited exceptions apply. Players may hold more than one non-FIFA nationality.

No.	Pos.	Nation	Player

== Zweigen Kanazawa ==
In: Note: Flags indicate national team as defined under FIFA eligibility rules; some limited exceptions apply. Players may hold more than one non-FIFA nationality.

No.	Pos.	Nation	Player

Out: Note: Flags indicate national team as defined under FIFA eligibility rules; some limited exceptions apply. Players may hold more than one non-FIFA nationality.

No.	Pos.	Nation	Player
4	DF	JPN	Tatsushi Koyanagi (on loan to (Japan) Thespakusatsu Gunma)
30	FW	JPN	Masato Yamazaki (on loan to (Japan) Thespakusatsu Gunma)

== FC Gifu ==
In: Note: Flags indicate national team as defined under FIFA eligibility rules; some limited exceptions apply. Players may hold more than one non-FIFA nationality.

No.	Pos.	Nation	Player
33	FW	BRA	Michael (from (Brazil) Alagoinhas Atlético Clube)
34	DF	JPN	Fumitaka Kitatani (on loan from (Japan) V-Varen Nagasaki)

Out: Note: Flags indicate national team as defined under FIFA eligibility rules; some limited exceptions apply. Players may hold more than one non-FIFA nationality.

No.	Pos.	Nation	Player
11	FW	JPN	Kyogo Furuhashi (to (Japan) Vissel Kobe)
20	MF	JPN	Woo Sang-ho (on loan to (Japan) Ehime FC)

== Kamatamare Sanuki ==
In: Note: Flags indicate national team as defined under FIFA eligibility rules; some limited exceptions apply. Players may hold more than one non-FIFA nationality.

No.	Pos.	Nation	Player
28	MF	JPN	Hideo Tanaka (on loan from (Japan) Tegevajaro Miyazaki)
30	DF	JPN	Akira Takeuchi (on loan from (Japan) Oita Trinita)

Out: Note: Flags indicate national team as defined under FIFA eligibility rules; some limited exceptions apply. Players may hold more than one non-FIFA nationality.

No.	Pos.	Nation	Player
27	DF	JPN	Tomoya Hayashi (on loan to (Japan) Kōchi United SC)

== Renofa Yamaguchi ==
In: Note: Flags indicate national team as defined under FIFA eligibility rules; some limited exceptions apply. Players may hold more than one non-FIFA nationality.

No.	Pos.	Nation	Player
8	MF	BRA	Julinho (on loan from (Japan) Consadole Sapporo)
35	MF	BRA	Washington (from (Japan) Nagoya Grampus)
50	FW	JPN	Kazuma Takai (from (Japan) Tokyo Verdy)

Out: Note: Flags indicate national team as defined under FIFA eligibility rules; some limited exceptions apply. Players may hold more than one non-FIFA nationality.

No.	Pos.	Nation	Player
8	FW	JPN	Kosuke Onose (to (Japan) Gamba Osaka)
22	DF	BRA	Gerson Vieira (to (India) Atlético de Kolkata)

== Roasso Kumamoto ==
In: Note: Flags indicate national team as defined under FIFA eligibility rules; some limited exceptions apply. Players may hold more than one non-FIFA nationality.

No.	Pos.	Nation	Player
45	MF	JPN	Tomonobu Yokoyama (on loan from (Japan) Consadole Sapporo)
50	MF	JPN	Koki Mizuno (on loan from (Japan) Sagan Tosu)

Out: Note: Flags indicate national team as defined under FIFA eligibility rules; some limited exceptions apply. Players may hold more than one non-FIFA nationality.

No.	Pos.	Nation	Player

== Tochigi SC ==
In: Note: Flags indicate national team as defined under FIFA eligibility rules; some limited exceptions apply. Players may hold more than one non-FIFA nationality.

No.	Pos.	Nation	Player
20	MF	JPN	Go Hayama (on loan from (Japan) Albirex Niigata)
41	MF	JPN	Yuki Nishiya (from (Germany) TuS Erndtebrück)
42	DF	BRA	Paulão (free agent)
49	FW	BRA	Alex (on loan from (Japan) Kagoshima United FC)

Out: Note: Flags indicate national team as defined under FIFA eligibility rules; some limited exceptions apply. Players may hold more than one non-FIFA nationality.

No.	Pos.	Nation	Player
4	MF	JPN	Ren Sengoku (on loan to (Japan) Gainare Tottori)
21	MF	JPN	Taku Ushinohama (on loan to (Japan) Kagoshima United FC)
20	DF	BRA	Diogo Ferreira (released)
25	FW	SLO	Nejc Pečnik (released)
