= Woo Sang-ho =

Woo Sang-ho may refer to:

- Woo Sang-ho (footballer)
- Woo Sang-ho (politician)
