= Jun Okano =

Japanese footballer

Jun Okano 岡野 洵
Personal information
- Full name: Jun Okano
- Date of birth: December 9, 1997 (age 28)
- Place of birth: Chiba, Japan
- Height: 1.86 m (6 ft 1 in)
- Position: Centre back

Team information
- Current team: Blaublitz Akita
- Number: 4

Youth career
- –2009: Kotehashidai SC
- 2010–2015: JEF United Chiba

Senior career*
Years	Team	Apps	(Gls)
2016–2021	JEF United Chiba	58	(0)
2018–2019	→ Oita Trinita (loan)	10	(0)
2022	Machida Zelvia	20	(1)
2023–2025	V-Varen Nagasaki	28	(0)
2026–	Blaublitz Akita	3	(0)
- * Club domestic league appearances and goals as of 00:03, 8 November 2026 (UTC)

Jun Okano (岡野 洵, Okano Jun; born December 9, 1997) is a Japanese footballer who plays as a centre back for J2 League club Blaublitz Akita.

== Career ==
=== Club ===
Jun Okano joined J2 League club JEF United Chiba in 2016.

=== International ===
In 2015, he had chosen Japanese International U-18 England expedition team member with Takahiro Yanagi, Reiya Morishita, Itsuki Urata, Takumi Hasegawa, Daniel Matsuzaka and Kakeru Funaki as defender.

In 30th Dec 2017, he had chosen Japanese International U-20 Thailand expedition team member.

== Club statistics ==
As of 8 November 2026.

Appearances and goals by club, season and competition
Club	Season	League			National cup (Note: Includes Emperor's Cup)		League cup (Note: Includes J.League Cup)		Total	
Club	Season	Division	Apps	Goals	Apps	Goals	Apps	Goals	Apps	Goals
JEF United Chiba	2016	J2 League	7	0	0	0	–		7	0
JEF United Chiba	2017	J2 League	11	0	1	0	–		12	0
JEF United Chiba	2018	J2 League	4	0	1	0	–		5	0
JEF United Chiba	2020	J2 League	10	0	0	0	–		10	0
JEF United Chiba	2021	J2 League	26	0	1	0	–		27	0
JEF United Chiba	Total		58	0	3	0	0	0	61	0
Oita Trinita (loan)	2018	J2 League	6	0	0	0	0	0	6	0
Oita Trinita (loan)	2019	J1 League	4	0	1	0	6	0	11	0
Oita Trinita (loan)	Total		10	0	1	0	6	0	17	0
Machida Zelvia	2022	J2 League	20	1	1	1	–		21	2
V-Varen Nagasaki	2023	J2 League	23	0	1	0	0	0	24	0
V-Varen Nagasaki	2024	J2 League	2	0	0	0	1	0	3	0
V-Varen Nagasaki	2025	J2 League	3	0	1	0	0	0	4	0
V-Varen Nagasaki	Total		28	0	2	0	1	0	31	0
Blaublitz Akita	2026	J2/J3 (100)	3	0	–		–		3	0
Blaublitz Akita	2026–27	J2 League	0	0	1	0	1	0	2	0
Blaublitz Akita	Total		3	0	1	0	1	0	5	0
Career total			119	1	8	1	8	0	135	2
