= Yushi Nagashima =

Japanese footballer

Yushi Nagashima 永島 悠史
Personal information
- Full name: Yushi Nagashima
- Date of birth: July 12, 1996 (age 30)
- Place of birth: Seika, Kyoto, Japan
- Height: 1.70 m (5 ft 7 in)
- Position: Midfielder

Youth career
- –2014: Kyoto Sanga

Senior career*
Years	Team	Apps	(Gls)
2015–2018	Kyoto Sanga	7	(0)
2017–2018	→ FC Gifu (loan)	49	(6)
2019–2020	FC Gifu	38	(3)
2021–2022	Gainare Tottori	25	(4)

International career
2013	Japan U-17	3	(0)
- * Club domestic league appearances and goals

Yushi Nagashima (永島 悠史, Nagashima Yushi; born July 12, 1996) is a Japanese former football player.

== National team career ==
In October 2013, Nagashima was elected Japan U-17 national team for 2013 U-17 World Cup. He played in three matches.

== Career statistics ==
Updated to 23 February 2018.

Appearances and goals by club, season and competition
Club	Season	League			Emperor's Cup		Total	
Club	Season	Division	Apps	Goals	Apps	Goals	Apps	Goals
Kyoto Sanga	2015	J2 League	7	0	2	0	9	0
Kyoto Sanga	2016	J2 League	0	0	0	0	0	0
FC Gifu	2017	J2 League	39	5	2	0	41	5
Career total			46	5	4	0	50	5
