= Yuma Hiroki =

Japanese footballer (born 1992)

Yuma Hiroki 廣木雄磨
Personal information
- Full name: Yuma Hiroki
- Date of birth: 23 July 1992 (age 34)
- Place of birth: Akishima, Tokyo, Japan
- Height: 1.68 m (5 ft 6 in)
- Position: Defender

Youth career
- 2005–2010: FC Tokyo U-15/18
- 2011–2014: Tokyo Gakugei University

Senior career*
Years	Team	Apps	(Gls)
2015–2018	Renofa Yamaguchi	85	(0)
2019–2022	Fagiano Okayama	46	(0)
2023	Boroondara-Carey Eagles FC		
Total		131	(0)

International career
2007	Japan U-17	2	(0)
- * Club domestic league appearances and goals

Yuma Hiroki (廣木雄磨, Hiroki Yuma; born 23 July 1992 in Akishima, Tokyo) is a Japanese former footballer who played as a defender.

== National team career ==
In October 2009, Hiroki was elected Japan U-17 national team for 2009 U-17 World Cup. He played 2 matches.

== Club statistics ==
Appearances and goals by club, season and competition
Club	Season	League			National cup (Note: Includes Emperors Cup)		Total	
Club	Season	Division	Apps	Goals	Apps	Goals	Apps	Goals
Renofa Yamaguchi	2015	J3 League	27	0	0	0	27	0
Renofa Yamaguchi	2016	J2 League	20	0	2	0	22	0
Renofa Yamaguchi	2017	J2 League	27	0	0	0	27	0
Renofa Yamaguchi	2018	J2 League	11	0	0	0	11	0
Renofa Yamaguchi	Total		85	0	2	0	87	0
Fagiano Okayama	2019	J2 League	36	0	2	0	38	0
Fagiano Okayama	2021	J2 League	10	0	1	0	11	0
Fagiano Okayama	2022	J2 League	0	0	0	0	0	0
Fagiano Okayama	Total		46	0	3	0	49	0
Career total			131	0	5	0	136	0
