= Kotaro Fujiwara =

Japanese footballer

Kōtarō Fujiwara 藤原 広太朗
Personal information
- Full name: Kōtarō Fujiwara
- Date of birth: 17 April 1990 (age 36)
- Place of birth: Itabashi, Japan
- Height: 1.75 m (5 ft 9 in)
- Position: Centre back

Team information
- Current team: Kagoshima United (on loan from Tochigi SC)
- Number: 4

Youth career
- 2009–2012: Ritsumeikan University

Senior career*
| Years | Team | Apps | (Gls) |
| 2013–2018 | Tokushima Vortis | 190 | (1) |
| 2019– | Tochigi SC | 27 | (1) |
| 2020– | → Kagoshima United (loan) | 18 | (0) |
- * Club domestic league appearances and goals as of 21:08, 18 January 2021 (UTC)

Kotaro Fujiwara (藤原 広太朗, Fujiwara Kōtarō; born 17 April 1990) is a Japanese professional footballer who plays as defender for Kagoshima United FC on loan from Tochigi SC.

== Career statistics ==
Updated to end of 2018 season.

Appearances and goals by club, season and competition
| Club | Season | League | | | Emperor's Cup | | J.League Cup | | Total | |
| Club | Season | Division | Apps | Goals | Apps | Goals | Apps | Goals | Apps | Goals |
|---|---|---|---|---|---|---|---|---|---|---|
| Tokushima Vortis | 2013 | J2 League | 42 | 0 | 1 | 0 | — | | 43 | 0 |
| Tokushima Vortis | 2014 | J1 League | 26 | 0 | 1 | 0 | 4 | 0 | 31 | 0 |
| Tokushima Vortis | 2015 | J2 League | 34 | 0 | 4 | 1 | — | | 38 | 1 |
| Tokushima Vortis | 2016 | J2 League | 25 | 1 | 1 | 0 | — | | 26 | 1 |
| Tokushima Vortis | 2017 | J2 League | 36 | 0 | 1 | 0 | — | | 37 | 0 |
| Tokushima Vortis | 2018 | J2 League | 26 | 0 | 2 | 0 | — | | 28 | 0 |
| Career total | | | 189 | 1 | 10 | 1 | 4 | 0 | 213 | 2 |
