= Taiki Tamukai =

Japanese footballer

Taiki Tamukai 田向 泰輝
Personal information
- Full name: Taiki Tamukai
- Date of birth: March 24, 1992 (age 34)
- Place of birth: Mito, Ibaraki, Japan
- Height: 1.75 m (5 ft 9 in)
- Position: Defender

Team information
- Current team: Tokushima Vortis
- Number: 2

Youth career
- –2003: Joto SSS
- 2004–2006: Mito Daisan Junior High School
- 2007–2009: Mito Junior College High School

College career
Years	Team	Apps	(Gls)
2010–2013	Ryutsu Keizai University		

Senior career*
Years	Team	Apps	(Gls)
2014–2018	Mito HollyHock	124	(3)
2019–	Tokushima Vortis	106	(1)
- * Club domestic league appearances and goals as of 21 January 2026

Taiki Tamukai (田向 泰輝, Tamukai Taiki; born March 24, 1992 in Mito, Ibaraki) is a Japanese football player for Tokushima Vortis.

== Club statistics ==
Updated to end of 2018 season.

Appearances and goals by club, season and competition
Club	Season	League			Emperor's Cup		Total	
Club	Season	Division	Apps	Goals	Apps	Goals	Apps	Goals
Mito HollyHock	2014	J2 League	8	0	0	0	8	0
Mito HollyHock	2015	J2 League	29	1	2	0	31	1
Mito HollyHock	2016	J2 League	35	0	0	0	35	0
Mito HollyHock	2017	J2 League	23	0	0	0	23	0
Mito HollyHock	2018	J2 League	29	2	0	0	29	2
Career total			124	3	2	0	126	3
