= Ryoma Nishimura =

Japanese footballer

Ryoma Nishimura 西村 竜馬
Personal information
- Full name: Ryoma Nishimura
- Date of birth: 2 July 1993 (age 33)
- Place of birth: Ina, Nagano, Japan
- Height: 1.85 m (6 ft 1 in)
- Position: Centre back

Team information
- Current team: Toho Titanium
- Number: 5

Youth career
- 2008–2011: Albirex Niigata

Senior career*
Years	Team	Apps	(Gls)
2012–2018	Albirex Niigata	16	(0)
2012	→ GE Mauaense (loan)		
2013	→ Japan Soccer College (loan)	12	(3)
2014–2015	→ Azul Claro Numazu (loan)	53	(3)
2017–2018	→ Montedio Yamagata (loan)	12	(0)
2019	Veertien Mie	10	(0)
2020–	Toho Titanium		
- * Club domestic league appearances and goals as of 1 January 2020

Ryoma Nishimura (西村 竜馬, Nishimura, Ryoma; born 2 July 1993 in Ina, Nagano) is a Japanese footballer who plays for Toho Titanium.

== Career ==
On 22 February 2019, Nishimura joined Veertien Mie.

== Career statistics ==
Updated to 1 January 2020.

Appearances and goals by club, season and competition
Club	Season	League			Emperor's Cup		J.League Cup		Total	
Club	Season	Division	Apps	Goals	Apps	Goals	Apps	Goals	Apps	Goals
Albirex Niigata	2012	J1 League	0	0	–		0	0	0	0
Japan Soccer College	2013	JRL (Hokushinetsu)	12	3	–		–		12	3
Azul Claro Numazu	2014	JFL	24	1	–		–		24	1
Azul Claro Numazu	2015	JFL	29	2	–		–		29	2
Albirex Niigata	2016	J1 League	7	0	1	0	1	0	9	0
Albirex Niigata	2017	J1 League	2	0	2	1	4	0	8	1
Montedio Yamagata	2017	J2 League	4	0	–		–		4	0
Montedio Yamagata	2018	J2 League	8	0	2	0	–		10	0
Veertien Mie	2019	JFL	10	0	0	0	–		10	0
Career total			96	6	5	1	5	0	106	7
