= Kaito Anzai =

Japanese football player for Braga B

Kaito Anzai 安西 海斗
Personal information
- Full name: Kaito Anzai
- Date of birth: February 19, 1998 (age 28)
- Place of birth: Saitama, Japan
- Height: 1.72 m (5 ft 7 1/2 in)
- Position: Midfielder

Team information
- Current team: Veertien Mie

Youth career
- 2010–2015: Kashiwa Reysol

Senior career*
Years	Team	Apps	(Gls)
2016–2018	Kashiwa Reysol	0	(0)
2017–2018	→ Montedio Yamagata (loan)	25	(0)
2019–2020	Braga B	6	(0)
2020–2021	Vilaverdense	0	(0)
2022	Vonds Ichihara	12	(0)
2023–	Veertien Mie	0	(0)
- * Club domestic league appearances and goals as of 20 November 2022, 12:20 (UTC)

Kaito Anzai (安西 海斗, Anzai Kaito; born February 19, 1998) is a Japanese footballer who plays for Veertien Mie from 2023.

== Career ==
On 25 January 2019, Anzai left Kashiwa Reysol after eight years in the team, and joined the reserve team of SC Braga, signing in a two-and-a-half-year contract. In 2020, Anzai joined Vilaverdense FC, who plays on the fourth tier Portugal, for the 2020–21 season.

After a brief two-year career at Portugal, he announced his return to Japan on 24 March 2022, as he joined Kantō Soccer League (of JRL) club Vonds Ichihara. On 16 December at same year, Anzai departed from the club after just a single season, due to contract expiration. Five days later, he was announced as a new signing for JFL club Veertien Mie for the upcoming 2023 season.

== Career statistics ==
Updated to the end 2022 season.

=== Club ===
Club performance			League		Cup		League Cup		Total	
Season	Club	League	Apps	Goals	Apps	Goals	Apps	Goals	Apps	Goals
Japan			League		Emperor's Cup		J. League Cup		Total	
2016	Kashiwa Reysol	J1 League	0	0	0	0	0	0	0	0
2017	Kashiwa Reysol	J1 League	0	0	1	0	2	0	3	0
2017	Montedio Yamagata	J2 League	10	0	–		–		10	0
2018	Montedio Yamagata	J2 League	15	0	4	0	–		19	0
2022	Vonds Ichihara	Japanese Regional Leagues	12	0	0	0	0	0	12	0
2023	Veertien Mie	Japan Football League	0	0	0	0	0	0	0	0
Total			37	0	5	0	2	0	44	0
