= Shigeru Yokotani =

Japanese footballer

Shigeru Yokotani 横谷 繁
Personal information
- Full name: Shigeru Yokotani
- Date of birth: May 3, 1987 (age 39)
- Place of birth: Nishinomiya, Hyōgo, Japan
- Height: 1.79 m (5 ft 10 in)
- Position: Midfielder

Team information
- Current team: Ehime FC
- Number: 7

Youth career
- 2003–2005: Gamba Osaka Youth

Senior career*
Years	Team	Apps	(Gls)
2006–2012	Gamba Osaka	18	(0)
2008–2009	→ Ehime FC (loan)	81	(8)
2013	→ Kyoto Sanga FC (loan)	37	(11)
2014	Kyoto Sanga FC	24	(0)
2015–2018	Omiya Ardija	115	(12)
2019	Ventforet Kofu	36	(0)
2020–	Ehime FC	2	(1)

International career
2006	Japan U-19		
Medal record
Gamba Osaka
Runner-up	J1 League	2010
Winner	J.League Cup	2007
Runner-up	Emperor's Cup	2006
Runner-up	Emperor's Cup	2012
- * Club domestic league appearances and goals as of 11:49, 7 July 2020 (UTC)

Shigeru Yokotani (横谷 繁, Yokotani Shigeru; born May 3, 1987 in Nishinomiya, Hyōgo) is a Japanese footballer who plays for Ehime FC.

== Career ==
Born in Hyōgo Prefecture, Yokotani was brought up in the Koto area of Nishinomiya where he attended the Koryo junior high school.

Yokotani was a product of Gamba Osaka youth academy and has been capped for the Japan at Under 17, 19 and Under 21 level. He was a member of the Japan squad playing at the AFC Youth Championship in 2006.

Yokotani was promoted to Gamba's first team in 2008. He made his first team debut on 7 July 2007, in a League Cup tie away at Urawa Red Diamonds. In January 2008, he joined 2nd Division side Ehime on loan. He scored his first goal for Ehime in a 4–1 defeat at Sanfrecce Hiroshima, on 23 September 2008.

On 7 January 2013, Yokotani moved to Kyoto Sanga on a season-long loan. He then signed for Kyoto-based club, before moving to Omiya Ardija.

== Club statistics ==
Updated to 23 February 2018.

Club performance			League		Cup		League Cup		Continental		Total	
Season	Club	League	Apps	Goals	Apps	Goals	Apps	Goals	Apps	Goals	Apps	Goals
Japan			League		Emperor's Cup		J. League Cup		AFC		Total	
2006	Gamba Osaka	J1 League	0	0	0	0	0	0	0	0	0	0
2007	Gamba Osaka	J1 League	0	0	0	0	2	0	–		0	0
2008	Ehime FC	J2 League	36	2	2	0	–		–		38	2
2009	Ehime FC	J2 League	45	6	1	0	–		–		46	6
2010	Gamba Osaka	J1 League	0	0	1	0	0	0	1	0	2	0
2011	Gamba Osaka	J1 League	11	0	1	0	0	0	1	0	13	0
2012	Gamba Osaka	J1 League	7	0	1	1	0	0	0	0	8	1
2013	Kyoto Sanga	J2 League	37	11	1	1	–		–		38	12
2014	Kyoto Sanga	J2 League	24	0	1	0	–		–		25	0
2015	Omiya Ardija	J2 League	38	8	2	0	–		–		40	8
2016	Omiya Ardija	J1 League	31	3	3	0	4	0	–		38	3
2017	Omiya Ardija	J1 League	23	1	0	0	5	0	–		28	1
Total			252	31	13	2	11	0	2	0	278	33
