= Kiwara Miyazaki =

Japanese footballer (born 1998)

Kiwara Miyazaki 宮崎 幾笑
Personal information
- Full name: Kiwara Miyazaki
- Date of birth: February 17, 1998 (age 28)
- Place of birth: Minakami, Gunma, Japan
- Height: 1.75 m (5 ft 9 in)
- Positions: Left winger; left back

Youth career
- 2010–2012: Thespa Kusatsu Youth
- 2013–2015: Albirex Niigata Youth

Senior career*
Years	Team	Apps	(Gls)
2015–2018	Albirex Niigata	1	(0)
2017–2018	→ Zweigen Kanazawa (loan)	58	(5)
2019–2020	FC Tokyo	1	(0)
2019	FC Tokyo U-23	25	(4)
2021–2024	Fagiano Okayama	37	(2)
2023	→ Iwaki FC (loan)	0	(0)
2024	Ayutthaya United	11	(2)
- * Club domestic league appearances and goals as of 10 August 2022

Kiwara Miyazaki (宮崎 幾笑, Miyazaki, Kiwara; born February 17, 1998) is a Japanese footballer who plays as a midfielder.

== Club career ==
Miyazaki is an academy graduate of Albirex Niigata, having joined the club at the age of 15 and was rewarded with his first professional contract on 8 May 2015. He made his debut on 7 November 2015, appearing as a substitute in a 2–0 defeat at home to Shonan Bellmare.

In December 2016, Miyazaki was loaned to J2 League side Zweigen Kanazawa for the 2017 season.

== Career statistics ==
Updated to 25 February 2019.

Appearances and goals by club, season and competition
Club	Season	League			Emperor's Cup		J.League Cup		Total	
Club	Season	Division	Apps	Goals	Apps	Goals	Apps	Goals	Apps	Goals
Albirex Niigata	2015	J1 League	1	0	2	0	0	0	3	0
Albirex Niigata	2016	J1 League	0	0	1	0	1	0	2	0
Zweigen Kanazawa	2017	J2 League	35	1	2	1	—		37	6
Zweigen Kanazawa	2018	J2 League	23	4	1	0	—		24	4
Career total			59	5	6	1	1	0	66	10
