= Daiki Numa =

Japanese footballer

Daiki Numa 沼 大希
Personal information
- Full name: Daiki Numa
- Date of birth: 2 May 1997 (age 29)
- Place of birth: Neyagawa, Osaka, Japan
- Height: 1.76 m (5 ft 9 in)
- Position: Forward

Team information
- Current team: Vonds Ichihara
- Number: 17

Youth career
- 2010–2015: Kyoto Sanga

Senior career*
Years	Team	Apps	(Gls)
2016–2018	Kyoto Sanga	11	(1)
2017	→ Gainare Tottori (loan)	30	(4)
2018	→ Tegevajaro Miyazaki (loan)	3	(0)
2019	SV Horn	10	(5)
2020–	Vonds Ichihara		
- * Club domestic league appearances and goals as of 1 January 2020

Daiki Numa (沼 大希, Numa Daiki; born 2 May 1997) is a Japanese footballer for Vonds Ichihara.

== Club career ==
=== SV Horn ===
Numa signed for SV Horn in January 2019.

== Club statistics ==
Updated to 23 February 2019.

Club performance			League		Cup		Total	
Season	Club	League	Apps	Goals	Apps	Goals	Apps	Goals
Japan			League		Emperor's Cup		Total	
2016	Kyoto Sanga	J2 League	6	1	0	0	6	1
2017	Gainare Tottori	J3 League	30	4	1	0	31	4
2018	Kyoto Sanga	J2 League	5	0	1	0	6	0
2018	Tegevajaro Miyazaki	JFL	3	0	–		3	0
Career total			44	5	2	0	46	5
