= Paulão (footballer, born 1989) =

Brazilian footballer (born 1989)

Personal information
- Full name: Luis Paulo da Silva
- Date of birth: December 4, 1989 (age 36)
- Place of birth: Rio Grande do Sul, Brazil
- Height: 1.92 m (6 ft 3 1/2 in)
- Position: Centre back

Team information
- Current team: Shanghai Jiading Huilong

Senior career*
Years	Team	Apps	(Gls)
2009–2013	Roma Apucarana		
2009	→ Engenheiro Beltrão (loan)		
2011	→ Cascavel (loan)		
2013–2015	→ Consadole Sapporo (loan)	44	(3)
2016–2017	Consadole Sapporo	0	(0)
2016	→ Fukushima United (loan)	18	(2)
2017	→ Mito HollyHock (loan)	9	(0)
2018	Tochigi SC	16	(3)
2019	Albirex Niigata	2	(0)
2020–2021	FC Gifu	3	(0)
2022–	Shanghai Jiading Huilong	0	(0)
- * Club domestic league appearances and goals as of 12:36, 16 July 2022 (UTC)

Luis Paulo da Silva (born 4 December 1989), known as Paulão, is a Brazilian football player. He currently plays for Shanghai Jiading Huilong in China League One.

== Club statistics ==
Updated to 4 December 2022.

Club performance			League		Cup		Total	
Season	Club	League	Apps	Goals	Apps	Goals	Apps	Goals
Japan			League		Emperor's Cup		Total	
2013	Consadole Sapporo	J2 League	7	1	1	0	8	1
2014	Consadole Sapporo	J2 League	22	2	0	0	22	2
2015	Consadole Sapporo	J2 League	15	0	1	0	16	0
2016	Fukushima United FC	J3 League	18	2	1	0	19	2
2017	Mito HollyHock	J2 League	9	0	1	0	10	0
2018	Tochigi SC	J2 League	16	3	0	0	16	3
2019	Albirex Niigata	J2 League	2	0	0	0	2	0
2020	FC Gifu	J3 League	1	0	0	0	1	0
2021	FC Gifu	J3 League	2	0	0	0	2	0
China			League		FA Cup		Total	
2022	Shanghai Jiading Huilong	China League One	15	2	0	0	15	2
Total			113	10	4	0	117	10
