= Go Hayama =

Japanese footballer

Personal information
- Full name: Go Hayama
- Date of birth: 9 April 1993 (age 33)
- Place of birth: Tokyo, Japan
- Height: 1.76 m (5 ft 9 1/2 in)
- Position: Midfielder

Youth career
- –2011: Tokyo Verdy

College career
Years	Team	Apps	(Gls)
2012–2015	Keio University		

Senior career*
Years	Team	Apps	(Gls)
2013	→ Tokyo Verdy (loan)	7	(0)
2015–2018	Albirex Niigata	24	(2)
2018	→ Tochigi SC (loan)	5	(1)
2019	Machida Zelvia	4	(0)
2020–2021	Sydney Olympic	12	(0)
Total		52	(3)
- * Club domestic league appearances and goals as of 23:29, 22 January 2024

Go Hayama (端山 豪, Hayama Gō; born 9 April 1993) is a retired Japanese football player who played as a midfielder.

== Career ==
He attended Keio University, and gained experience with Tokyo Verdy in the 2013 J2 season. Go made his league debut for Tokyo against Hokkaido Consadole Sapporo on the 14 July 2013.

Recruited by Albirex Niigata, he became a professional player for his first team in 2016. He made his league debut for Albirex against Yokohama F. Marinos on the 12 September 2015. He scored his first goal for the club against Matsumoto Yamaga on the 17 October 2015, scoring in the 61st minute.

Go made his league debut for Tochigi against Fagiano Okayama on the 1 September 2018. He scored his first goal for the club against Tokushima Vortis on the 8 September 2018, scoring in the 66th minute.

Go made his league debut for Machida against Kashiwa Reysol on the 2 March 2019.

Go made his league debut for Sydney against Marconi Stallions on the 14 March 2020.

On 31 March 2021, 27-year old Hayama announced his retirement from football after a spell with Australian club Sydney Olympic FC.

== Club career statistics ==
Updated to end of 2018 season.

Appearances and goals by club, season and competition
Club	Season	League		Emperor's Cup		J. League Cup		Total	
Club	Season	Apps	Goals	Apps	Goals	Apps	Goals	Apps	Goals
Tokyo Verdy	2013	7	0	–		–		7	0
Albirex Niigata	2015	8	1	–		3	0	11	1
Albirex Niigata	2016	9	1	2	0	3	0	14	1
Albirex Niigata	2017	5	0	2	0	6	0	13	0
Albirex Niigata	2018	2	0	1	0	5	0	8	0
Tochigi SC	2018	5	1	–		–		5	1
Total		36	3	5	0	17	0	58	3
