= Yoshiki Fujimoto =

Japanese footballer

Yoshiki Fujimoto 藤本 佳希
Personal information
- Full name: Yoshiki Fujimoto
- Date of birth: 3 February 1994 (age 32)
- Place of birth: Matsuyama, Ehime, Japan
- Height: 1.78 m (5 ft 10 in)
- Position: Forward

Team information
- Current team: Ehime FC
- Number: 9

Youth career
- –2005: Aso FC
- 2006–2008: Kume Junior High School
- 2009–2011: Saibi High School

College career
Years	Team	Apps	(Gls)
2012–2015	Meiji University		

Senior career*
Years	Team	Apps	(Gls)
2016–2018	Fagiano Okayama	42	(1)
2018	→ Ehime FC (loan)	12	(3)
2019–2021	Ehime FC	91	(19)
2022–2025	Montedio Yamagata	80	(20)
2025–	Ehime FC	13	(1)
- * Club domestic league appearances and goals as of 17 August 2026

Yoshiki Fujimoto (藤本 佳希, Fujimoto, Yoshiki; born 3 February 1994 in Ehime) is a Japanese footballer who plays for Ehime FC.

== Career statistics ==
=== Club ===
Updated to the start of 2023 season.

Club performance			League		Cup		Total	
Season	Club	League	Apps	Goals	Apps	Goals	Apps	Goals
Japan			League		Emperor's Cup		Total	
2016	Fagiano Okayama	J2 League	23	0	3	3	26	3
2017	Fagiano Okayama	J2 League	19	1	2	0	21	1
2018	Fagiano Okayama	J2 League	0	0	1	0	1	0
2018	Ehime FC	J2 League	12	3	–		12	3
2019	Ehime FC	J2 League	39	9	1	0	40	9
2020	Ehime FC	J2 League	17	0	–		17	0
2021	Ehime FC	J2 League	35	10	0	0	35	10
2022	Montedio Yamagata	J2 League	15	7	0	0	14	7
2023	Montedio Yamagata	J2 League	0	0	0	0	0	0
Career total			160	30	7	3	167	33
