= Yuki Nakayama =

Japanese footballer (born 1994)

Yuki Nakayama 中山 雄希
Personal information
- Full name: Yuki Nakayama
- Date of birth: 16 October 1994 (age 32)
- Place of birth: Saitama, Japan
- Height: 1.74 m (5 ft 9 in)
- Position: Forward

Team information
- Current team: Veroskronos Tsuno

Youth career
- 2010–2012: Omiya Ardija

College career
Years	Team	Apps	(Gls)
2013–2016	Waseda University		

Senior career*
Years	Team	Apps	(Gls)
2017–2018	Yokohama FC	13	(0)
2018	→ Kagoshima United FC (loan)	11	(1)
2019–2020	Azul Claro Numazu	35	(1)
2021	SC Sagamihara	15	(1)
2022–2023	Giravanz Kitakyushu	61	(5)
2024–	Veroskronos Tsuno		
- * Club domestic league appearances and goals as of 18:20, 19 December 2024 (UTC)

Yuki Nakayama (中山 雄希, Nakayama Yūki; born 16 October 1994), is a Japanese professional footballer who plays as forward for Veroskronos Tsuno.

== Career ==
On 5 December 2023, it was announced that Nakayama's contract would not be renewed for the 2024 season.

On 1 March 2024, Nakayama joined Veroskronos Tsuno.

== Career statistics ==
Updated to 23 February 2019.

Appearances and goals by club, season and competition
Club	Season	League			Emperor's Cup		Total	
Club	Season	Division	Apps	Goals	Apps	Goals	Apps	Goals
Yokohama FC	2017	J2 League	12	0	1	0	13	0
Yokohama FC	2018	J2 League	1	0	2	0	3	0
Kagoshima United FC	2018	J3 League	11	1	0	0	11	1
Career total			24	1	3	0	27	1
