= Yoshihiro Shoji =

Japanese footballer (born 1989)

Personal information
- Date of birth: September 14, 1989 (age 37)
- Place of birth: Numazu, Shizuoka, Japan
- Height: 1.75 m (5 ft 9 in)
- Position: Midfielder

Youth career
- 2005–2007: Shimizu Shogyo High School

College career
Years	Team	Apps	(Gls)
2008–2011	Senshu University		

Senior career*
Years	Team	Apps	(Gls)
2012–2014	Machida Zelvia	83	(0)
2015–2016	Renofa Yamaguchi	77	(4)
2017	FC Gifu	41	(5)
2018	Vegalta Sendai	0	(0)
2018	→ Kyoto Sanga (loan)	20	(1)
2019–2021	Kyoto Sanga	88	(3)
2022–2024	FC Gifu	92	(2)
Total		401	(15)
Medal record
Vegalta Sendai
Runner-up	Emperor's Cup	2018
- * Club domestic league appearances and goals

Yoshihiro Shoji (庄司 悦大, Shōji Yoshihiro; born September 14, 1989) is a Japanese former professional football player who played as a midfielder.

Known for his leadership skills and passing skills, Shoji has served as captain in three different seasons. He has appeared in over 400 career matches.

== Career ==
On 24 January 2014, Shoji was announced at Renofa Yamaguchi on a permanent transfer. For the 2016 season, he swapped his shirt number to 10. Shoji won the April 2016 Meiji Yasuda J.League Monthly MVP award for his number of passes and highest pass success rate.

On 8 February 2017, Shoji was appointed captain ahead of the 2017 season. During the 2017 J2 season, he recorded 4,101 passes, the most in the league, and 901 more than second place.

In 2018, Shoji was announced at Vegalta Sendai on a permanent transfer. Ahead of the 2018 season, he was selected as a "player to watch" in the J1 League.

On 14 July 2018, Shoji was announced at Kyoto Sanga on a six month loan deal. On 19 December 2018, he was announced at Kyoto Sanga on a permanent deal. On 3 December 2021, the club announced that Shoji's contract would expire at the end of the 2021 season.

On 27 December 2021, Shoji was announced at FC Gifu on a permanent transfer. He was appointed captain ahead of the 2023 season, and was kept as captain ahead of the 2024 season.

On 12 November 2024, Shoji announced his retirement at the end of the 2024 season.

== Style of play ==
He has been described as having "outstanding passing ability" by former Japan national team midfielder Hideo Hashimoto.

== Club statistics ==
Updated to end of 2018 season.

Club performance			League		Cup		League Cup		Total	
Season	Club	League	Apps	Goals	Apps	Goals	Apps	Goals	Apps	Goals
Japan			League		Emperor's Cup		J.League Cup		Total	
2012	Machida Zelvia	J2 League	27	0	1	0	-		28	0
2013	Machida Zelvia	JFL	28	0	-		-		28	0
2014	Machida Zelvia	J3 League	28	0	-		-		28	0
2015	Renofa Yamaguchi	J3 League	35	0	1	0	-		36	0
2016	Renofa Yamaguchi	J2 League	42	4	3	0	-		45	4
2017	FC Gifu	J2 League	41	5	2	0	-		43	5
2018	Vegalta Sendai	J1 League	0	0	0	0	3	0	3	0
2018	Kyoto Sanga	J2 League	20	1	0	0	-		20	1
Total			221	10	7	0	3	0	231	10
