= Masakazu Tashiro =

Japanese footballer (born 1988)

Personal information
- Full name: Masakazu Tashiro
- Date of birth: June 26, 1988 (age 38)
- Place of birth: Meguro, Tokyo, Japan
- Height: 1.82 m (6 ft 0 in)
- Positions: Defender; defensive midfielder

Team information
- Current team: SC Sagamihara
- Number: 5

Youth career
- –2006: Yokohama F. Marinos

Senior career*
Years	Team	Apps	(Gls)
2007–2013	Yokohama F. Marinos	5	(0)
2011–2012	→ FC Machida Zelvia (loan)	66	(1)
2014–2015	JEF United Chiba	15	(0)
2016	Montedio Yamagata	30	(1)
2017–2018	V-Varen Nagasaki	31	(0)
2018	→ Yokohama FC (loan)	17	(3)
2019–2021	Yokohama FC	11	(1)
2021	→ Machida Zelvia (loan)	0	(0)
2022	Omiya Ardija	15	(1)
2023-2024	Iwate Grulla Morioka	32	(1)
2024–	SC Sagamihara	31	(1)
Medal record
Yokohama F. Marinos
Runner-up	J1 League	2013
Winner	Emperor's Cup	2013
- * Club domestic league appearances and goals as of 1 January 2026

Masakazu Tashiro (Japanese: 田代 真一, born June 26, 1988) is a Japanese football player who currently plays for the SC Sagamihara in J3 League.

== Career ==
On 4 November 2006, Yokohama F. Marinos announced that Tashiro would be promoted to the first team from the 2007 season. He was described as "A center back who is strong in one-on-one situations and is characterized by tenacious man-marking." by Gekisaka writer Masaki Takada.

Tashiro joined FC Machida Zelvia on a one year loan in 2011. On 6 January 2012, his loan to FC Machida Zelvia was extended by another year.

Tashiro joined JEF United Chiba on 6 January 2014. He made his first start for the club against Zweigen Kanazawa on 17 May 2015. On 27 November 2015, the club announced it would not be renewing his contract for the 2016 season.

On 23 December 2015, Tashiro was announced at Montedio Yamagata.

For the 2017 season, V-Varen Nagasaki announced that Tashiro would be one of three vice captains of the club.

On 23 July 2021, Tashiro rejoined Machida Zelvia on a one year loan contract after last playing for the club 9 years ago.

On 30 December 2021, Tashiro was announced at Omiya Ardija. On 31 October 2022, the club announced it would not be renewing his contract for the 2023 season, as Tashiro became a free agent.

On 11 January 2023, Tashiro was announced at Iwate Grulla Morioka. He scored on his league debut against Ehime FC on 5 March 2023, scoring in the 49th minute.

On 26 December 2023, Tashiro was announced at SC Sagamihara. He made his league debut against Kamatamare Sanuki on 30 March 2024.

== Club statistics ==
Updated to 1 March 2019.

Club performance			League		Cup		League Cup		Total	
Season	Club	League	Apps	Goals	Apps	Goals	Apps	Goals	Apps	Goals
Japan			League		Emperor's Cup		League Cup		Total	
2007	Yokohama F. Marinos	J1 League	0	0	0	0	0	0	0	0
2008	Yokohama F. Marinos	J1 League	0	0	0	0	0	0	0	0
2009	Yokohama F. Marinos	J1 League	5	0	0	0	5	0	10	0
2010	Yokohama F. Marinos	J1 League	0	0	1	0	0	0	1	0
2011	Machida Zelvia	JFL	32	1	2	0	-		34	1
2012	Machida Zelvia	J2 League	34	0	3	0	-		37	0
2013	Yokohama F. Marinos	J1 League	0	0	0	0	0	0	0	0
2014	JEF United Chiba	J2 League	3	0	4	1	-		7	1
2015	JEF United Chiba	J2 League	12	0	2	0	-		14	0
2016	Montedio Yamagata	J2 League	30	1	3	0	–		33	1
2017	V-Varen Nagasaki	J2 League	31	0	0	0	–		31	0
2018	V-Varen Nagasaki	J1 League	0	0	1	0	4	0	5	0
2018	Yokohama FC	J2 League	16	3	0	0	–		16	3
Career total			163	5	16	1	9	0	188	6
