= Ferrugem (footballer, born 1988) =

Brazilian footballer

Personal information
- Full name: Weverton Almeida Santos Evaristo
- Date of birth: 28 March 1988 (age 38)
- Place of birth: São Mateus, Espírito Santo, Brazil
- Height: 1.82 m (6 ft 0 in)
- Positions: Right-back; midfielder

Team information
- Current team: Cuiabá

Youth career
- 2007: Criciúma

Senior career*
Years	Team	Apps	(Gls)
2008	São Mateus		
2009	Gama		
2009	Ceilandense		
2010	Gama		
2010–2012	Brasiliense	52	(6)
2013–2017	Ponte Preta	30	(1)
2014	→ Corinthians (loan)	7	(0)
2015	→ Vissel Kobe (loan)	12	(1)
2015	→ Sport (loan)	14	(1)
2016	→ Figueirense (loan)	36	(2)
2017	Figueirense	23	(0)
2018	CSA	14	(0)
2018	Ventforet Kofu	6	(0)
2019	CRB	36	(6)
2020–	Cuiabá	4	(0)
- * Club domestic league appearances and goals as of 6:43, 20 May 2016 (UTC)

Weverton Almeida Santos Evaristo (born 28 March 1988), commonly known as Ferrugem, is a Brazilian professional footballer who plays as right-back and a midfielder for Cuiabá.

== Career ==
Ferrugem was born in São Mateus, Espírito Santo. He began his career with Criciúma youth, before moves to São Mateus, Gama and then Ceilandense. After a short stay with Ceilandense, Ferrugem returned to Gama in 2010. His second spell with Gama lasted just a matter of months as he joined Brasiliense in June, he appeared in 22 matches of Brasiliense's relegation campaign from Série B. 30 appearances followed in 2011 and 2012 before completing a transfer to current club Ponte Preta.

On 10 March 2013, Ferrugem suffered a horrific leg injury in a Série B home game against São Caetano after a tackle by Danielzinho. As a result, he tore his ligaments and dislocated his left ankle joints. Controversially, Danielzinho only received a yellow card.

After 24 appearances in all competitions over two seasons for Ponte Preta, Ferrugem agreed to join Corinthians on loan. He made his Corinthians debut in an away win against rivals Santos, he participated in five more games for the club before returning to Ponte Preta.

2015 saw Ferrugem move out of Brazil for the first time in his career as he joined J1 League side Vissel Kobe on loan. He played in 8 league matches and 4 cup games before departing in July. Upon arriving back in his homeland, Ferrugem spent the rest of 2015 with Sport. He returned to Ponte Preta in 2016 and played six times for the club in the 2016 Campeonato Paulista before again leaving the club on loan, this time he completed a move to Figueirense.

== Honours ==
Brasiliense

- Campeonato Brasiliense: 2011

Ponte Preta

- Campeonato Paulista do Interior: 2013
