= Jeong Chung-geun =

South Korean footballer (born 1995)

Jeong Chung-geun 정충근
Personal information
- Full name: Jeong Chung-geun
- Date of birth: 1 March 1995 (age 31)
- Place of birth: Pohang, South Korea
- Height: 1.82 m (6 ft 0 in)
- Position: Midfielder

Team information
- Current team: Gyeongnam
- Number: 19

Youth career
- 2005: Cheongrim Elementary School
- 2006–2008: Pohang Steelers
- 2009–2010: Ganggu Middle School
- 2010–2013: Nantes

Senior career*
Years	Team	Apps	(Gls)
2013–2016	Nantes II	36	(2)
2016–2018	Yokohama	51	(7)
2018	→ Fagiano Okayama (loan)	16	(2)
2019–2020	Machida Zelvia	52	(3)
2021	Suwon	14	(0)
2022	Gyeongnam	20	(3)
2023	Yeoju	28	(17)
2024	Seoul Jungnang	18	(7)
2024–	Gyeongnam	24	(1)

International career
2017	South Korea U-23		
- * Club domestic league appearances and goals as of 7 January 2026

Jeong Chung-geun (born 1 March 1995) is a South Korean professional footballer who plays for K League 2 club Gyeongnam.

== Career ==
After playing for various youth teams in his native South Korea, Jeong moved to the Nantes academy in France in 2010. Between 2013 and 2016, he would compete for the reserve team in the fourth-tier Championnat National 2.

Jeong Chung-geun joined J2 League club Yokohama FC on 20 December 2016. He made 52 appearances for the club, scoring three goals. From July 2018 to December 2018, he was loaned to league rivals Fagiano Okayama. In 2019, he signed with Machida Zelvia, who also competed in the second division. After 52 second division games, he returned to South Korea in early 2021. There, he signed a contract with Suwon in the K League 1.

Ahead of the 2022 season, Jeong joined Gyeongnam after being part of a swap deal involving Chang Hyuk-jin.

== Club statistics ==
Updated as of 2022 season.

Club performance			League		Cup		Total	
Season	Club	League	Apps	Goals	Apps	Goals	Apps	Goals
France			League		Cup		Total	
2013–14	FC Nantes II	CFA2	7	0	–		7	0
2014–15	FC Nantes II	CFA2	18	1	–		18	1
2015–16	FC Nantes II	CFA2	11	1	–		11	1
Japan			League		Cup		Total	
2017	Yokohama FC	J2 League	37	7	0	0	37	7
2018	Yokohama FC	J2 League	14	0	2	0	16	0
2018	Fagiano Okayama	J2 League	16	2	–		16	2
2019	FC Machida Zelvia	J2 League	27	1	1	0	28	1
2020	FC Machida Zelvia	J2 League	25	2	0	0	25	2
South Korea			League		Cup		Total	
2021	Suwon FC	K League 1	14	0	0	0	14	0
2022	Gyeongnam FC	K League 2	2	1	0	0	2	1
Total			171	15	3	0	174	15
