= Juninho (footballer, born 1994) =

Brazilian footballer

Personal information
- Full name: Junior Silva Ferreira
- Date of birth: September 26, 1994 (age 32)
- Place of birth: Brazil
- Height: 1.65 m (5 ft 5 in)
- Position: Midfielder

Team information
- Current team: Tochigi SC
- Number: 11

Youth career
- 2007–2015: Cruzeiro

Senior career*
| Years | Team | Apps | (Gls) |
| 2015–2018 | FC Osaka | 79 | (14) |
| 2018 | → Kyoto Sanga FC (loan) | 16 | (2) |
| 2019–2020 | Kyoto Sanga FC | 33 | (3) |
| 2021– | Tochigi SC | 41 | (2) |
- * Club domestic league appearances and goals as of 7:15, 23 October 2022 (UTC)

Junior Silva Ferreira (born September 26, 1994), also known as Juninho, is a Brazilian footballer who plays for J2 League club Tochigi SC.

== Career statistics ==
Last update: end of 2022 season

| Club performance | | | League | | Cup | | League Cup | | Total | |
| Season | Club | League | Apps | Goals | Apps | Goals | Apps | Goals | Apps | Goals |
|---|---|---|---|---|---|---|---|---|---|---|
| 2015 | FC Osaka | JFL | 18 | 1 | 2 | 1 | - | | 20 | 2 |
| 2016 | FC Osaka | JFL | 20 | 5 | - | | - | | 20 | 5 |
| 2017 | FC Osaka | JFL | 29 | 7 | 2 | 1 | - | | 31 | 8 |
| 2018 | FC Osaka | JFL | 12 | 1 | 1 | 1 | - | | 13 | 2 |
| 2018 | Kyoto Sanga | J2 League | 16 | 2 | 0 | 0 | - | | 16 | 2 |
| 2019 | Kyoto Sanga | J2 League | 20 | 2 | 1 | 0 | - | | 21 | 2 |
| 2020 | Kyoto Sanga | J2 League | 13 | 1 | 0 | 0 | - | | 13 | 1 |
| 2021 | Tochigi SC | J2 League | 30 | 2 | 1 | 0 | - | | 31 | 2 |
| 2022 | Tochigi SC | J2 League | 11 | 0 | 1 | 1 | - | | 12 | 1 |
| Career total | | | 169 | 21 | 8 | 4 | - | | 177 | 25 |
