= Ryo Toyama =

Japanese footballer (born 1994)

Ryo Toyama 外山 凌
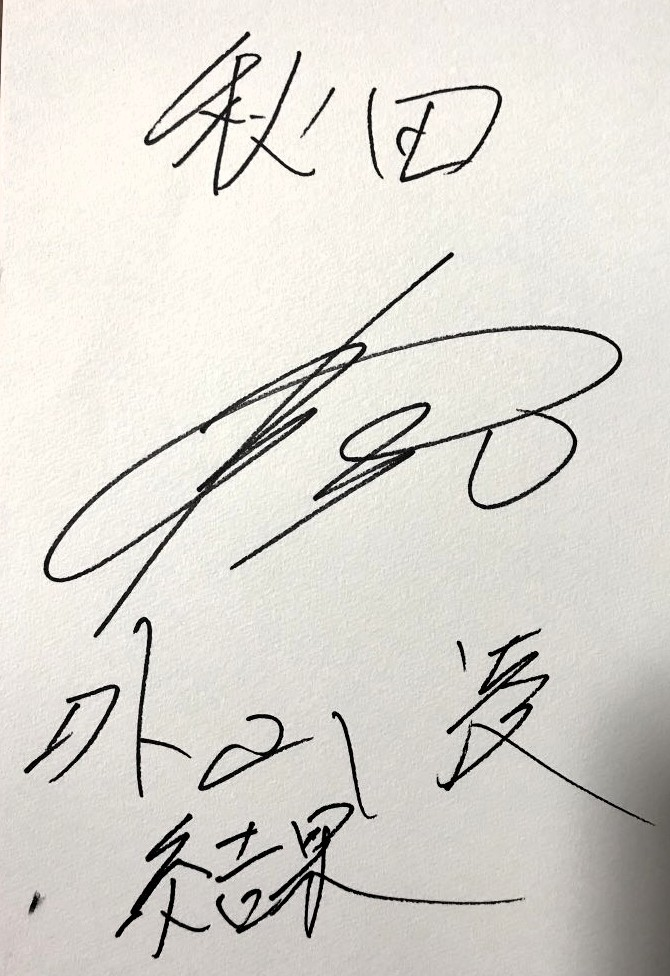
- Autograph in 2018

Personal information
- Full name: Ryo Toyama
- Date of birth: July 29, 1994 (age 32)
- Place of birth: Kiyose, Tokyo, Japan
- Height: 1.77 m (5 ft 9 1/2 in)
- Position: Midfielder

Team information
- Current team: FC Gifu
- Number: 23

Youth career
- –2009: Tokyo Verdy
- 2010–2012: Maebashi Ikuei High School

College career
Years	Team	Apps	(Gls)
2013–2016	Hannan University		

Senior career*
Years	Team	Apps	(Gls)
2017–2020	Mito HollyHock	74	(2)
2018	→ Blaublitz Akita (loan)	14	(3)
2021–2023	Matsumoto Yamaga FC	73	(8)
2023–2024	Tokushima Vortis	14	(0)
2024	→ Kagoshima United (loan)	28	(0)
2025–	FC Gifu	46	(2)
- * Club domestic league appearances and goals as of 17 August 2026

Ryo Toyama (外山 凌, Toyama Ryo; born July 29, 1994) is a Japanese football player who plays for J3 League club FC Gifu.

== Career ==
Ryo Toyama joined J2 League club Mito HollyHock in 2017.

== Club statistics ==
Updated to end of 2020 season.

Club performance			League		Cup		Total	
Season	Club	League	Apps	Goals	Apps	Goals	Apps	Goals
Japan			League		Emperor's Cup		Total	
2017	Mito HollyHock	J2 League	21	1	1	0	22	1
2018	Mito HollyHock	J2 League	6	0	2	0	8	0
2018	Blaublitz Akita	J3 League	14	3	–		14	3
2019	Mito HollyHock	J2 League	13	0	1	0	14	0
2020	Mito HollyHock	J2 League	34	1	–		34	1
2021	Matsumoto Yamaga	J2 League	41	2	1	0	42	2
Total			129	7	5	0	134	7
