= Yuto Koizumi =

Japanese footballer

Personal information
- Full name: Yuto Koizumi
- Date of birth: September 14, 1995 (age 31)
- Place of birth: Kamisu, Ibaraki, Japan
- Height: 1.90 m (6 ft 3 in)
- Position: Goalkeeper

Team information
- Current team: Ventforet Kofu
- Number: 21

Youth career
- 2008–2013: Kashima Antlers Youth

Senior career*
Years	Team	Apps	(Gls)
2014–2018	Kashima Antlers	0	(0)
2014	→ J.League U-22	1	(0)
2017–2018	→ Mito HollyHock (loan)	0	(0)
2018–2019	Mito HollyHock	0	(0)
2018–2019	→ Grulla Morioka (loan)	12	(0)
2019	Thespakusatsu Gunma	0	(0)
2019	→ Ventforet Kofu (loan)	0	(0)
2020–	Ventforet Kofu	1	(0)
Medal record
Kashima Antlers
Winner	J1 League	2016
Runner-up	J1 League	2017
Winner	J.League Cup	2015
Winner	Emperor's Cup	2016
- * Club domestic league appearances and goals as of 22:12, 17 December 2019 (UTC)

Yuto Koizumi (小泉 勇人, Koizumi Yuto; born September 14, 1995, in Ibaraki) is a Japanese football player. He plays for Ventforet Kofu.

== Playing career ==
Yuto Koizumi joined to J1 League club; Kashima Antlers in 2014.

== Career statistics ==
Updated to 23 February 2016.

Club	Season	League		Emperor's Cup		J. League Cup		AFC		Other^{1}		Total	
Club	Season	Apps	Goals	Apps	Goals	Apps	Goals	Apps	Goals	Apps	Goals	Apps	Goals
Kashima Antlers	2014	0	0	0	0	0	0	–		–		0	0
Kashima Antlers	2015	0	0	0	0	0	0	0	0	–		0	0
Kashima Antlers	2016	0	0	0	0	0	0	–		0	0	0	0
Career total		0	0	0	0	0	0	0	0	0	0	0	0

^{1}Includes Japanese Super Cup and FIFA Club World Cup.
