= Yuki Kagawa =

Japanese footballer

Yuki Kagawa 香川 勇気
Personal information
- Full name: Yuki Kagawa
- Date of birth: July 2, 1992 (age 34)
- Place of birth: Miki, Hyōgo, Japan
- Height: 1.80 m (5 ft 11 in)
- Position: Left back

Team information
- Current team: Kataller Toyama
- Number: 3

Youth career
- –2007: Il Sole Ono
- 2008–2010: Takigawa Daini High School

College career
Years	Team	Apps	(Gls)
2011–2014	Hannan University		

Senior career*
Years	Team	Apps	(Gls)
2015–2017	Renofa Yamaguchi	65	(2)
2017–2019	V-Varen Nagasaki	35	(5)
2018	→ Tokyo Verdy (loan)	9	(0)
2020–2025	Oita Trinita	96	(1)
2025–	Kataller Toyama	24	(1)
- * Club domestic league appearances and goals as of 23:51, 1 November 2026 (UTC)

Yuki Kagawa (香川 勇気, Kagawa Yūki; born July 2, 1992) is a Japanese footballer who plays as a defender for J2 League club Kataller Toyama.

== Career ==
After attending Hannan University, Kagawa was signed in 2015 by Renofa Yamaguchi.

== Club statistics ==
As of 1 November 2026.

Appearances and goals by club, season and competition
Club	Season	League			National cup (Note: Includes Emperor's Cup)		League cup (Note: Includes J.League Cup)		Other		Total	
Club	Season	Division	Apps	Goals	Apps	Goals	Apps	Goals	Apps	Goals	Apps	Goals
Renofa Yamaguchi	2015	J3 League	22	0	1	0	–		–		23	0
Renofa Yamaguchi	2016	J2 League	27	1	1	0	–		–		28	1
Renofa Yamaguchi	2017	J2 League	16	1	1	0	–		–		17	1
Renofa Yamaguchi	Total		65	2	3	0	0	0	0	0	68	2
V-Varen Nagasaki	2017	J2 League	1	1	0	0	0	0	–		1	1
V-Varen Nagasaki	2018	J1 League	2	0	0	0	6	0	–		8	0
V-Varen Nagasaki	2019	J2 League	32	4	0	0	3	0	–		35	4
V-Varen Nagasaki	Total		35	5	0	0	9	0	0	0	44	5
Tokyo Verdy (loan)	2018	J2 League	9	0	1	0	–		3 (Note: Appearance in J1/J2 play-offs)	0	13	0
Oita Trinita	2020	J1 League	16	0	0	0	0	0	0	0	16	0
Oita Trinita	2021	J1 League	30	1	1	0	3	0	0	0	34	1
Oita Trinita	2022	J2 League	10	0	0	0	3	0	0	0	13	0
Oita Trinita	2023	J2 League	13	0	1	0	0	0	0	0	14	0
Oita Trinita	2024	J2 League	20	0	2	0	0	0	0	0	22	0
Oita Trinita	2025	J2 League	7	0	1	0	1	0	0	0	9	0
Oita Trinita	Total		96	1	5	0	7	0	0	0	108	1
Kataller Toyama	2025	J2 League	13	1	0	0	0	0	–		13	1
Kataller Toyama	2026	J2/J3 (100)	10	0	–		–		–		10	0
Kataller Toyama	2026–27	J2 League	1	0	0	0	1	0	–		2	0
Kataller Toyama	Total		24	1	0	0	1	0	0	0	25	1
Career total			229	9	9	0	17	0	3	0	258	9
