= Taku Ushinohama =

Japanese footballer

Taku Ushinohama 牛之濵 拓
Personal information
- Full name: Taku Ushinohama
- Date of birth: July 14, 1992 (age 34)
- Place of birth: Kagoshima, Japan
- Height: 1.72 m (5 ft 7 1/2 in)
- Position: Midfielder

Team information
- Current team: Giravanz Kitakyushu
- Number: 21

Youth career
- –2010: Avispa Fukuoka

Senior career*
| Years | Team | Apps | (Gls) |
| 2011–2015 | Avispa Fukuoka | 28 | (3) |
| 2016 | Grulla Morioka | 28 | (9) |
| 2017–2018 | Tochigi SC | 43 | (9) |
| 2018 | → Kagoshima United FC (loan) | 11 | (1) |
| 2019–2023 | Kagoshima United FC | 104 | (16) |
| 2023-2024 | Gainare Tottori (Loan) | 33 | (9) |
| 2024- | Giravanz Kitakyushu | 53 | (3) |
- * Club domestic league appearances and goals as of 1 January 2026

Taku Ushinohama (牛之濵 拓, Ushinohama Taku; born July 14, 1992) is a Japanese football player for Giravanz Kitakyushu.

Playing primarily as a right winger, he capped his debut season with a brace against Montedio Yamagata during Avispa's 6–0 away win in J1 League.

== Career statistics ==
Updated to end of 2018 season.

Appearances and goals by club, season and competition
| Club | Season | League | | | Emperor's Cup | | J. League Cup | | Total | |
| Club | Season | Division | Apps | Goals | Apps | Goals | Apps | Goals | Apps | Goals |
|---|---|---|---|---|---|---|---|---|---|---|
| Avispa Fukuoka | 2011 | J1 League | 4 | 2 | 0 | 0 | 0 | 0 | 0 | 0 |
| Avispa Fukuoka | 2012 | J2 League | 0 | 0 | 0 | 0 | — | | 0 | 0 |
| Avispa Fukuoka | 2013 | J2 League | 11 | 1 | 1 | 0 | — | | 12 | 1 |
| Avispa Fukuoka | 2014 | J2 League | 10 | 0 | 1 | 0 | — | | 11 | 0 |
| Avispa Fukuoka | 2015 | J2 League | 3 | 0 | 2 | 0 | — | | 5 | 0 |
| Grulla Morioka | 2016 | J3 League | 28 | 9 | 3 | 2 | — | | 31 | 11 |
| Tochigi SC | 2017 | J3 League | 28 | 7 | — | | — | | 28 | 7 |
| Tochigi SC | 2018 | J2 League | 15 | 2 | 1 | 0 | — | | 16 | 2 |
| Kagoshima United | 2018 | J3 League | 11 | 1 | 0 | 0 | — | | 11 | 1 |
| Career total | | | 110 | 22 | 8 | 2 | 0 | 0 | 118 | 24 |
