= Takumi Hasegawa (footballer) =

Japanese footballer (born 1998)

Takumi Hasegawa 長谷川 巧
Personal information
- Full name: Takumi Hasegawa
- Date of birth: October 6, 1998 (age 28)
- Place of birth: Niigata, Japan
- Height: 1.78 m (5 ft 10 in)
- Position: Right back

Team information
- Current team: Blaublitz Akita
- Number: 32

Youth career
- Higashi Aoyama FC
- 2011–2016: Albirex Niigata

Senior career*
Years	Team	Apps	(Gls)
2015–2024	Albirex Niigata	30	(0)
2018	→ Thespakusatsu Gunma (loan)	3	(0)
2019–2020	→ Zweigen Kanazawa (loan)	58	(1)
2025–	Blaublitz Akita	31	(0)

International career
2015–2016	Japan U-18		
- * Club domestic league appearances and goals as of 14 August 2026

Takumi Hasegawa (長谷川 巧, Hasegawa Takumi; born October 6, 1998) is a Japanese footballer who plays as a right back for J2 League club Blaublitz Akita.

== Career ==
=== Albirex Niigata ===
On 8 May 2015, Hasegawa was promoted to the first team as a type-2 player. On 18 May 2016, he made his debut in the J.League Cup against Kashiwa Reysol. On 22 November 2016, Hasegawa was promoted to the first team from the 2017 season.

On 12 January 2021, Hasegawa returned to Albirex Niigata. On 5 February 2021, he suffered an ACL injury during a training session and would be out for 8 months. On 6 January 2022, Hasegawa's contract was extended for the 2022 season. On 7 January 2023, his contract was extended for the 2023 season. On 30 December 2023, Hasegawa's contract was extended for the 2024 season. On 15 May 2024, he suffered an injury that would keep him out for 4 weeks.

=== Loan to ThespaKusatsu Gunma ===
On 4 July 2018, Hasegawa joined Thespa Gunma on loan until 31 January 2019. He made his league debut against FC Tokyo II on 25 August 2018.

=== Loan to Zweigen Kanazawa ===
On 26 December 2018, Hasegawa's loan contract with Thespa expired, and he was loaned to Zweigen Kanazawa until 31 January 2020. He made his league debut against Tokyo Verdy on 9 March 2019. On 11 September 2019, Hasegawa suffered an ACL injury and would be out for 8 months. On 27 December 2019, his loan contract was extended until 31 January 2021. Hasegawa scored his first league goal against Thespa Gunma on 26 July 2020, scoring in the 73rd minute.

=== Blaublitz Akita ===
After 10 seasons with Albirex Niigata, at the end of the 2024 season Hasegawa transferred to J2 League club Blaublitz Akita.

== Personal life ==
Hasegawa is married.

== Club statistics ==
=== Club ===
As of end of 2024 season

Appearances and goals by club, season and competition
Club	Season	League			Emperor's Cup		J. League Cup		Other		Total	
Club	Season	Division	Apps	Goals	Apps	Goals	Apps	Goals	Apps	Goals	Apps	Goals
Albirex Niigata	2015	J1 League	0	0	2	0	0	0	–		2	0
Albirex Niigata	2016	J1 League	0	0	1	0	1	0	–		2	0
Albirex Niigata	2017	J1 League	0	0	1	0	4	0	–		5	0
Albirex Niigata	2018	J2 League	0	0	1	0	2	0	–		3	0
Albirex Niigata	2021	J2 League	5	0	0	0	–		–		5	0
Albirex Niigata	2022	J2 League	9	0	1	0	–		–		10	0
Albirex Niigata	2023	J1 League	10	0	3	1	4	0	–		17	1
Albirex Niigata	2024	J1 League	6	0	1	0	4	1	–		11	1
Albirex Niigata	Total		30	0	10	1	15	1	0	0	55	2
Thespakusatsu Gumna (loan)	2018	J3 League	3	0	0	0	–		–		3	0
Zweigen Kanazawa (loan)	2019	J2 League	27	0	1	0	–		–		28	0
Zweigen Kanazawa (loan)	2020	J2 League	31	1	0	0	–		–		31	1
Zweigen Kanazawa (loan)	Total		58	1	1	0	0	0	0	0	59	1
Blaublitz Akita	2025	J2 League	0	0	0	0	0	0	0	0	0	0
Career total			91	1	11	1	15	1	0	0	117	3
