= Woo Sang-ho (footballer) =

Zainichi Korean footballer (born 1992)

Woo Sang-ho 우상호 禹相皓 禹 相皓
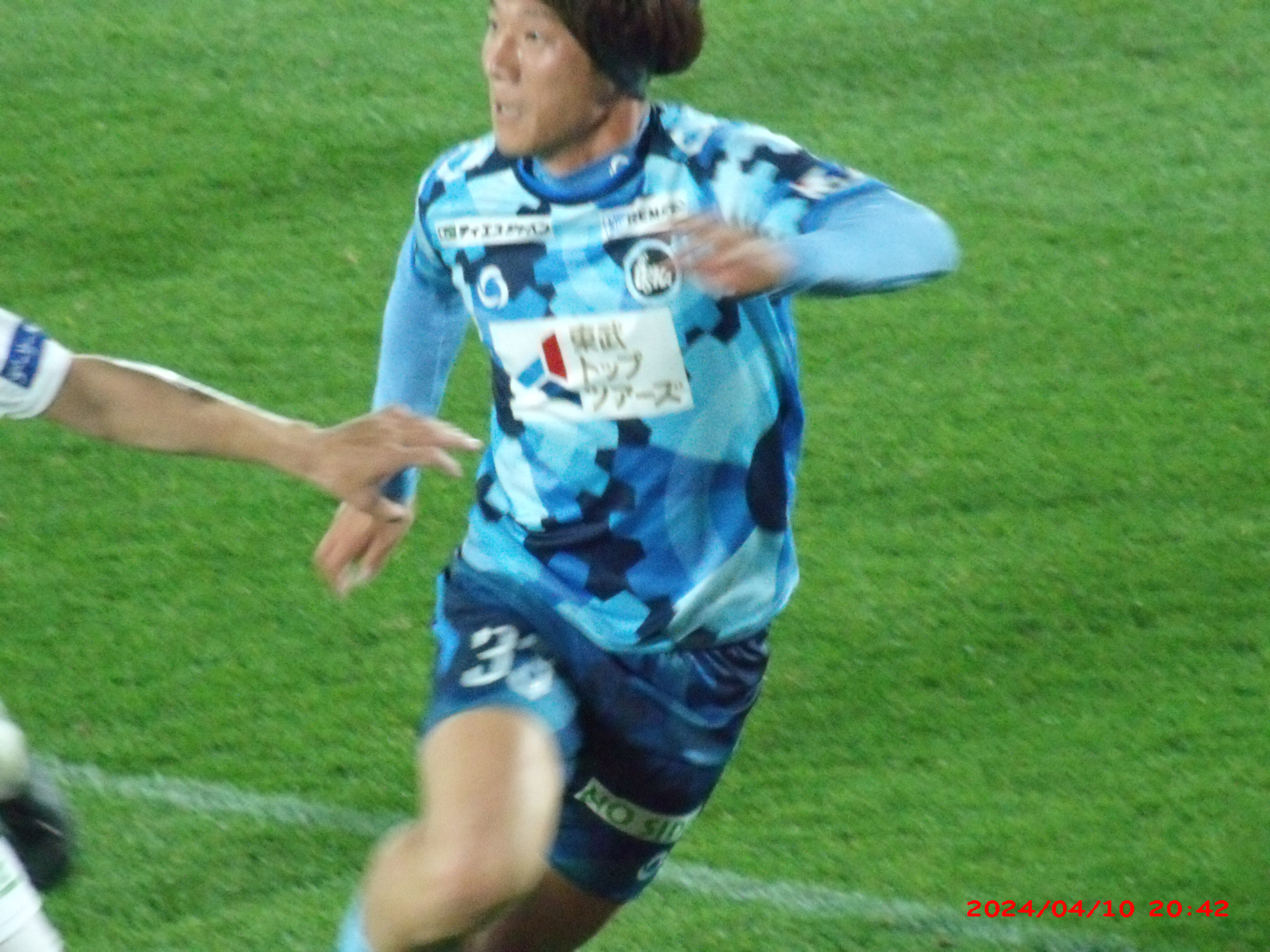
- Woo in action with FC Osaka in 2024

Personal information
- Full name: Woo Sang-ho (South Korea); Sangho Woo (Japan)
- Date of birth: 7 December 1992 (age 33)
- Place of birth: Sapporo, Hokkaido, Japan
- Height: 1.74 m (5 ft 8 1/2 in)
- Position: Midfielder

Team information
- Current team: Kamatamare Sanuki
- Number: 66

Youth career
- 2006–2009: Kashiwa Reysol

College career
Years	Team	Apps	(Gls)
2010–2013	Meikai University		

Senior career*
Years	Team	Apps	(Gls)
2015–2016	Petrovac	29	(0)
2016–2017	Daegu	34	(1)
2018	Gifu	1	(0)
2018	→ Ehime (loan)	10	(0)
2019	Ehime	15	(0)
2020	Tochigi	17	(0)
2021	Saigon	10	(0)
2022–2025	FC Osaka	101	(2)
2026–	Kamatamare Sanuki	18	(1)
- * Club domestic league appearances and goals as of 24 May 2026

- Woo Sang-ho
- Hangul: 우상호
- Hanja: 禹相皓
- RR: U Sangho
- MR: U Sangho

Woo Sang-ho (禹 相皓, U Sanho; Korean: 우상호; Hancha: 禹相皓; born 7 December 1992) is a professional footballer who plays as a midfielder for Kamatamare Sanuki. Born in Japan, he received his South Korean passport.

== Career ==
Woo Sang-ho begin his career at youth team of Kashiwa Reysol.

In July 2016, Woo signed with Daegu FC after a one-year spell in Montenegro.

In 2022, Woo signed with FC Osaka. On 20 November 2022, he brought his club promoted to J3 League for the first time in history.

In 2026, he transferred permanently to Kamatamare Sanuki.
