= List of J2 League football transfers winter 2019–20 =

This is a list of Japanese football J2 League transfers in the winter transfer window 2019–20 by club.

== J2 League ==
=== Júbilo Iwata ===
In: Note: Flags indicate national team as defined under FIFA eligibility rules; some limited exceptions apply. Players may hold more than one non-FIFA nationality.

No.	Pos.	Nation	Player
6	DF	ARG	Juan Forlin (from (Spain) Real Oviedo)
8	MF	JPN	Kotaro Omori (from (Japan) FC Tokyo)
9	FW	JPN	Koki Ogawa (from (Japan) Mito HollyHock, end of loan)
15	MF	JPN	Hiroki Ito (from (Japan) Nagoya Grampus, end of loan)
16	FW	JPN	Seiya Nakano (from (Japan) Fagiano Okayama, end of loan)
19	FW	JPN	Naoto Miki (promoted from youth ranks)
20	FW	BRA	Lulinha (from (Cyprus) Pafos FC)
21	GK	JPN	Daichi Sugimoto (from (Japan) Yokohama F. Marinos)
23	DF	JPN	So Nakagawa (from (Japan) Kashiwa Reysol)
27	FW	JPN	Mahiro Yoshinaga (from Seiritsu Gakuen High School)
28	DF	JPN	Ryoma Ishida (from (Japan) Renofa Yamaguchi, end of loan)
29	DF	JPN	Kakeru Funaki (on loan from (Japan) Cerezo Osaka)
30	MF	JPN	Naoya Seita (promoted from youth ranks)
44	DF	JPN	Shun Obu (from (Japan) Albirex Niigata)

Out: Note: Flags indicate national team as defined under FIFA eligibility rules; some limited exceptions apply. Players may hold more than one non-FIFA nationality.

No.	Pos.	Nation	Player
4	DF	JPN	Ryo Shinzato (on loan to (Japan) Gamba Osaka)
7	MF	JPN	Taishi Taguchi (to (Japan) JEF United Chiba)
9	MF	JPN	Yoshiaki Ota (retired)
15	MF	BRA	Adaílton (to (Japan) FC Tokyo)
17	MF	JPN	Kentaro Moriya (on loan to (Japan) Ehime FC)
20	FW	JPN	Kengo Kawamata (to (Japan) JEF United Chiba)
21	GK	POL	Krzysztof Kaminski (to (Poland) Wisla Plock)
22	FW	JPN	Yoshito Okubo (to (Japan) Tokyo Verdy)
24	MF	JPN	Daigo Araki (to (Japan) Kyoto Sanga)
25	DF	JPN	Takuma Ominami (to (Japan) Kashiwa Reysol)
29	DF	JPN	Yosuke Akiyama (to (Japan) Nagoya Grampus, end of loan)
35	DF	JPN	Shun Morishita (to (Japan) Iwate Grulla Morioka)
37	DF	BRA	Fábio (released)
39	FW	JPN	Masato Nakayama (to (Japan) Mito HollyHock)
40	MF	NED	Lorenzo Ebecilio (released)
41	DF	JPN	Shohei Takahashi (on loan to (Japan) Tokyo Verdy)

=== Matsumoto Yamaga ===
In: Note: Flags indicate national team as defined under FIFA eligibility rules; some limited exceptions apply. Players may hold more than one non-FIFA nationality.

No.	Pos.	Nation	Player
1	GK	JPN	Kentaro Kakoi (from (Japan) Cerezo Osaka)
9	FW	BRA	Jael (on loan from (Japan) FC Tokyo)
15	DF	JPN	Reiya Morishita (on loan from (Japan) Cerezo Osaka)
17	MF	JPN	Koki Tsukagawa (from (Japan) FC Gifu, end of loan)
19	MF	JPN	Ryuhei Yamamoto (from (Japan) Montedio Yamagata, end of loan)
20	MF	BRA	Alvaro Rodrigues (from (Japan) Montedio Yamagata)
21	MF	BRA	Augusto César (from (Brazil) Chapecoense)
24	DF	JPN	Masaya Yoshida (from (Japan) Thespakusatsu Gunma)
25	FW	JPN	Itsuki Enomoto (from (Japan) Thespakusatsu Gunma, end of loan)
26	MF	JPN	Masaki Yamamoto (from (Japan) JEF United Chiba, previously on loan)
27	MF	JPN	Yuto Suzuki (on loan from (Japan) Kawasaki Frontale)
28	DF	JPN	Haruki Mitsuda (from Chuo University)
29	MF	JPN	Kaiga Murakoshi (from Iizuka High School)
30	MF	JPN	Manato Yamada (from Rissho University Shonan High School)
36	DF	JPN	Daichi Inui (from (Japan) Yokohama FC)
39	FW	JPN	Akito Takagi (on loan from (Japan) Gamba Osaka)
41	MF	JPN	Kazune Kubota (from (Japan) Kashima Antlers)
43	DF	JPN	Masato Tokida (on loan from (Japan) Vegalta Sendai)
—	GK	JPN	Kengo Nagai (from (Japan) Tokushima Vortis, end of loan)
—	DF	JPN	Takefumi Toma (from (Japan) FC Gifu, end of loan)
—	DF	JPN	Yota Shimokawa (from (Japan) Ehime FC, end of loan)
—	DF	JPN	Daiki Morimoto (from (Japan) SC Sagamihara, end of loan)
—	MF	JPN	Mitsuo Yamada (from (Japan) Azul Claro Numazu, end of loan)
—	FW	JPN	Yoshiki Oka (from (Japan) Azul Claro Numazu, end of loan)
—	FW	JPN	Han Yong-thae (from (Japan) Kagoshima United FC, end of loan)
—	FW	JPN	Ren Komatsu (from (Japan) Zweigen Kanazawa, end of loan)

Out: Note: Flags indicate national team as defined under FIFA eligibility rules; some limited exceptions apply. Players may hold more than one non-FIFA nationality.

No.	Pos.	Nation	Player
1	GK	JPN	Tatsuya Morita (to (Japan) Sagan Tosu)
4	DF	JPN	Masaki Iida (to (Japan) FC Maruyasu Okazaki)
9	FW	JPN	Hiroyuki Takasaki (to (Japan) FC Gifu)
11	FW	JPN	Ryo Nagai (to (Japan) Sanfrecce Hiroshima)
14	MF	BRA	Paulinho (to (Japan) Fagiano Okayama)
15	DF	BRA	Eduardo (to (Japan) Sagan Tosu)
21	GK	KOR	Goh Dong-min (on loan to (Japan) Vanraure Hachinohe)
25	MF	JPN	Yamato Machida (to (Japan) Oita Trinita)
30	DF	JPN	Yushi Mizubochi (to (Japan) JEF United Chiba, end of loan)
32	MF	JPN	Akira Ando (on loan to (Japan) Mito HollyHock)
34	DF	KOR	Jo Jin-woo (to (South Korea) Daegu FC)
35	MF	JPN	Masaki Miyasaka (to (Japan) Thespakusatsu Gunma)
41	DF	JPN	Hiroki Mizumoto (to (Japan) Sanfrecce Hiroshima, end of loan)
47	MF	JPN	Yuzo Iwakami (to (Japan) Thespakusatsu Gunma)
—	GK	JPN	Kengo Nagai (on loan to (Japan) Giravanz Kitakyushu)
—	DF	JPN	Yota Shimokawa (on loan to (Japan) Zweigen Kanazawa)
—	DF	JPN	Tomoki Imai (to (Australia) Western United FC)
—	DF	JPN	Daiki Morimoto (on loan to (Japan) FC Maruyasu Okazaki)
—	DF	JPN	Takefumi Toma (retired)
—	MF	JPN	Mitsuo Yamada (to (Australia) Wollongong United FC)
—	FW	JPN	Yoshiki Oka (to (Japan) Nagano Parceiro)
—	FW	JPN	Han Yong-thae (on loan to (Japan) Tochigi SC)
—	FW	JPN	Ren Komatsu (on loan to (Japan) Renofa Yamaguchi)
—	FW	JPN	Hiroki Yamamoto (to (Japan) Fagiano Okayama, previously on loan)

=== Omiya Ardija ===
In: Note: Flags indicate national team as defined under FIFA eligibility rules; some limited exceptions apply. Players may hold more than one non-FIFA nationality.

No.	Pos.	Nation	Player
4	DF	LAT	Vitalijs Maksimenko (from (Slovenia) NK Olimpija Ljubljana)
9	MF	JPN	Shunsuke Kikuchi (from (Japan) Shonan Bellmare)
10	MF	JPN	Atsushi Kurokawa (from (Japan) Mito HollyHock, end of loan)
14	MF	JPN	Takashi Kondo (from (Japan) Ehime FC)
17	FW	SRB	Nermin Haskic (from (Serbia) FK Radnicki Nis)
22	MF	JPN	Hijiri Onaga (from (Japan) V-Varen Nagasaki)
24	DF	JPN	Keisuke Nishimura (from Senshu University)
27	FW	JPN	Akira Toshima (on loan from (Japan) Yokohama FC)
30	FW	JPN	Takumu Fujinuma (from (Japan) Blaublitz Akita, end of loan)
31	GK	JPN	Rei Jones (promoted from youth ranks)
37	FW	JPN	Soya Takada (promoted from youth ranks)
39	MF	JPN	Shintaro Shimada (from (Japan) Oita Trinita, end of loan)
40	GK	SRB	Filip Kljajic (from (Serbia) Partizan Belgrade)
—	MF	JPN	Riku Yamada (from (Japan) Nagano Parceiro, end of loan)
—	MF	JPN	Kento Kawata (from (Japan) Tochigi SC, end of loan)
—	FW	JPN	Shintaro Shimizu (from (Japan) Mito HollyHock, end of loan)

Out: Note: Flags indicate national team as defined under FIFA eligibility rules; some limited exceptions apply. Players may hold more than one non-FIFA nationality.

No.	Pos.	Nation	Player
2	DF	JPN	Kosuke Kikuchi (to (Japan) Renofa Yamaguchi)
8	MF	JPN	Akimi Barada (to (Japan) Shonan Bellmare)
9	FW	SWE	Robin Simovic (to (Italy) Livorno)
10	FW	JPN	Genki Omae (to (Japan) Thespakusatsu Gunma)
11	MF	MKD	David Babunski (to (Romania) FC Botosani)
17	DF	JPN	Taisuke Nakamura (to (Japan) Iwate Grulla Morioka)
19	DF	JPN	Ryo Okui (to (Japan) Shimizu S-Pulse)
21	GK	JPN	Hitoshi Shiota (to (Japan) Tochigi SC)
22	FW	ESP	Juanma Delgado (to (Japan) Avispa Fukuoka)
23	MF	JPN	Shin Kanazawa (retired)
25	DF	JPN	Kazuma Takayama (on loan to (Japan) Montedio Yamagata)
31	GK	JPN	Keiki Shimizu (to (Japan) Thespakusatsu Gunma)
34	FW	JPN	Kazuaki Saso (on loan to (Japan) Nagano Parceiro)
45	DF	JPN	Kazuki Kushibiki (to (Japan) Nagoya Grampus, end of loan)
—	MF	JPN	Kento Kawata (on loan to (Japan) Nagano Parceiro)
—	MF	JPN	Riku Yamada (on loan to (Japan) Ventforet Kofu)
—	FW	JPN	Shintaro Shimizu (to (Japan) Fagiano Okayama)

=== Tokushima Vortis ===
In: Note: Flags indicate national team as defined under FIFA eligibility rules; some limited exceptions apply. Players may hold more than one non-FIFA nationality.

No.	Pos.	Nation	Player
1	GK	JPN	Takuya Seguchi (from (Japan) Kamatamare Sanuki)
3	DF	SRB	Dusan Cvetinovic (from (Japan) Yokohama F. Marinos)
11	MF	JPN	Yatsunori Shimaya (from (Japan) Sagan Tosu, previously on loan)
16	MF	JPN	Daiki Enomoto (on loan from (Japan) Nagoya Grampus)
19	FW	JPN	Yuki Kakita (on loan from (Japan) Kashima Antlers)
21	GK	JPN	Naoto Kamifukumoto (from (Japan) Tokyo Verdy)
24	MF	JPN	Kazuki Nishiya (from (Japan) Tochigi SC)
25	DF	JPN	Takashi Abe (from Chuo University)
27	DF	JPN	Noriki Fuke (from Hannan University)
30	FW	JPN	Taichi Takeda (from Waseda University)
32	DF	JPN	Yudai Okuda (from Kanoya National Institute of Fitness & Sports)
34	MF	JPN	Chie Edoojon Kawakami (from (Japan) SC Sagamihara, end of loan)
37	MF	JPN	Akira Hamashita (from (Japan) Tochigi SC)
38	MF	JPN	Ryota Kajikawa (from (Japan) Tokyo Verdy)
—	FW	JPN	Kiyoshiro Tsuboi (from (Japan) Blaublitz Akita, end of loan)

Out: Note: Flags indicate national team as defined under FIFA eligibility rules; some limited exceptions apply. Players may hold more than one non-FIFA nationality.

No.	Pos.	Nation	Player
1	GK	JPN	Kengo Nagai (to (Japan) Matsumoto Yamaga, end of loan)
3	DF	NED	Jordy Buijs (to (Japan) Kyoto Sanga)
6	MF	ESP	Sisinio (to (Japan) Ehime FC)
7	DF	JPN	Yuto Uchida (to (Japan) Sagan Tosu)
10	MF	JPN	Kenta Kano (released)
11	MF	JPN	Naoki Nomura (to (Japan) Oita Trinita)
14	MF	JPN	Ryuji Sugimoto (to (Japan) Yokohama F. Marinos)
19	DF	JPN	Daisei Suzuki (on loan to (Japan) FC Ryukyu)
21	GK	JPN	Yuji Kajikawa (to (Japan) Yokohama F. Marinos)
24	MF	JPN	Haruki Izawa (on loan to (Japan) Kagoshima United FC)
28	DF	JPN	Kotaro Kume (on loan to (Japan) Veertien Mie)
30	FW	UZB	Zabikhillo Urinboev (to (Uzbekistan) PFC Navbahor Namangan)
—	FW	JPN	Kiyoshiro Tsuboi (on loan to (Japan) Kochi United SC)

=== Ventforet Kofu ===
In: Note: Flags indicate national team as defined under FIFA eligibility rules; some limited exceptions apply. Players may hold more than one non-FIFA nationality.

No.	Pos.	Nation	Player
2	DF	JPN	Masato Fujita (from (Japan) Sagan Tosu)
6	MF	JPN	Hideyuki Nozawa (from (Japan) FC Tokyo)
9	FW	BRA	Rafael (from (Brazil) Figueirense)
11	MF	JPN	Jin Izumisawa (on loan from (Japan) Yokohama F. Marinos)
14	MF	JPN	Shohei Takeda (on loan from (Japan) Fagiano Okayama)
15	MF	JPN	Ryotaro Nakamura (from Chuo University)
16	FW	JPN	Riki Matsuda (from (Japan) Avispa Fukuoka)
20	DF	JPN	Daiki Nakashio (from Rissho University)
24	MF	JPN	Riku Yamada (on loan from (Japan) Omiya Ardija)
29	FW	BRA	Junior Barros (from (Japan) FC Gifu, end of loan)
32	DF	JPN	Keita Irumagawa (from (Japan) Nagano Parceiro, end of loan)
33	GK	JPN	Yuto Koizumi (from (Japan) Thespakusatsu Gunma, previously on loan)
41	FW	JPN	Mike Havenaar (from (Japan) Vissel Kobe)
—	MF	JPN	Kyosuke Goto (from (Japan) Thespakusatsu Gunma, end of loan)

Out: Note: Flags indicate national team as defined under FIFA eligibility rules; some limited exceptions apply. Players may hold more than one non-FIFA nationality.

No.	Pos.	Nation	Player
2	DF	JPN	Masato Yuzawa (to (Japan) Avispa Fukuoka)
6	DF	BRA	Eder Lima (released)
9	FW	NGR	Peter Utaka (to (Japan) Kyoto Sanga)
11	MF	JPN	Yutaka Soneda (to (Japan) Kyoto Sanga)
16	DF	JPN	Masaru Matsuhashi (retired)
17	MF	JPN	Shigeru Yokotani (to (Japan) Ehime FC)
18	FW	JPN	Koichi Sato (to (Japan) Veertien Mie)
22	DF	JPN	Yuta Koide (to (Japan) Oita Trinita)
23	GK	JPN	Hiroki Oka (on loan to (Japan) Kataller Toyama)
25	FW	JPN	Kota Mori (to (Japan) Renofa Yamaguchi)
26	MF	JPN	Kazuhiro Sato (to (Japan) Oita Trinita)
29	FW	BRA	Allano (to (Portugal) Estoril, end of loan)
40	MF	JPN	Shohei Ogura (retired)
41	DF	JPN	Yuto Takeoka (to (Japan) Renofa Yamaguchi)
—	MF	JPN	Kyosuke Goto (on loan to (Japan) Iwate Grulla Morioka)

=== Montedio Yamagata ===
In: Note: Flags indicate national team as defined under FIFA eligibility rules; some limited exceptions apply. Players may hold more than one non-FIFA nationality.

No.	Pos.	Nation	Player
5	DF	JPN	Hiroki Noda (from (Japan) Gamba Osaka, previously on loan)
8	MF	JPN	Hayata Komatsu (from (Japan) FC Ryukyu)
9	FW	BRA	Vinícius Araújo (from (Brazil) Vasco da Gama)
10	MF	JPN	Atsutaka Nakamura (from (Japan) Kashima Antlers)
15	DF	JPN	Toshiaki Miyamoto (on loan from (Japan) Kashiwa Reysol)
16	FW	JPN	Shunta Nakamura (from (Japan) Thespakusatsu Gunma, end of loan)
20	MF	JPN	Taiki Kato (from (Japan) Zweigen Kanazawa)
22	FW	JPN	Shuto Kitagawa (from (Japan) Giravanz Kitakyushu, end of loan)
24	DF	JPN	Kazuma Takayama (on loan from (Japan) Omiya Ardija)
26	DF	JPN	Kenya Onodera (from Meiji University)
29	MF	JPN	Mutsuki Hirooka (from JFA Academy Fukushima)
31	DF	JPN	Riku Handa (promoted from youth ranks)
32	GK	KOR	Mim Seung-jun (on loan from (South Korea) Incheon United)
33	FW	JPN	Junya Takahashi (from Komazawa University)
36	DF	JPN	Masahito Onoda (from (Japan) FC Imabari)
40	MF	JPN	Ryoma Watanabe (from (Japan) Albirex Niigata)
—	DF	JPN	Yu Tamura (from (Japan) Thespakusatsu Gunma, end of loan)

Out: Note: Flags indicate national team as defined under FIFA eligibility rules; some limited exceptions apply. Players may hold more than one non-FIFA nationality.

No.	Pos.	Nation	Player
5	DF	JPN	Kenichi Kaga (to (Japan) Blaublitz Akita)
8	MF	BRA	Alvaro Rodrigues (to (Japan) Matsumoto Yamaga)
9	FW	BRA	Jefferson Baiano (to (Brazil) Santa Rita, end of loan)
10	MF	JPN	Haruya Ide (to (Japan) Tokyo Verdy)
15	DF	JPN	Tatsuya Sakai (to (Thailand) Samut Prakan City)
20	MF	JPN	Issei Takahashi (to (Japan) JEF United Chiba, end of loan)
24	DF	JPN	Kenta Furube (to (Japan) J.FC Miyazaki)
27	MF	JPN	Tatsuhiro Sakamoto (to (Japan) Cerezo Osaka)
29	DF	BRA	Rodolfo (to (Brazil) Metropolitano, end of loan)
32	GK	JPN	Ryosuke Otomo (on loan to (Japan) Azul Claro Numazu)
36	DF	JPN	Takahiro Yanagi (to (Japan) FC Tokyo, end of loan)
37	FW	JPN	Akito Takagi (to (Japan) Gamba Osaka, end of loan)
39	MF	JPN	Daichi Akiyama (to (Japan) Cerezo Osaka, end of loan)
41	MF	JPN	Ryuhei Yamamoto (to (Japan) Matsumoto Yamaga, end of loan)
—	DF	JPN	Yu Tamura (on loan to (Japan) SC Sagamihara)
—	DF	JPN	Naruki Takahashi (to (Australia) Box Hill United)
—	FW	JPN	Ayumu Nagato (retired)

=== Mito HollyHock ===
In: Note: Flags indicate national team as defined under FIFA eligibility rules; some limited exceptions apply. Players may hold more than one non-FIFA nationality.

No.	Pos.	Nation	Player
2	DF	JPN	Jelani Sumiyoshi (from Kokushikan University)
3	MF	JPN	Yota Maejima (on loan from (Japan) Yokohama FC)
7	MF	JPN	Kota Yamada (on loan from (Japan) Yokohama F. Marinos)
8	MF	JPN	Akira Ando (on loan from (Japan) Matsumoto Yamaga)
9	FW	JPN	Masato Nakayama (from (Japan) Jubilo Iwata)
10	FW	JPN	Kazuma Yamaguchi (on loan from (Japan) Kashima Antlers)
15	MF	JPN	Koya Okuda (from (Japan) YSCC Yokohama)
16	FW	JPN	Yushi Yamaya (on loan from (Japan) Yokohama F. Marinos)
17	MF	JPN	Ryosuke Kawano (from (Japan) YSCC Yokohama)
18	MF	JPN	Shumpei Fukahori (on loan from (Japan) Nagoya Grampus)
21	GK	JPN	Ayumi Niekawa (from (Japan) Azul Claro Numazu)
26	MF	JPN	Kaito Hirata (promoted from youth ranks)
27	MF	JPN	Kai Matsuzaki (from Toyo University)
28	DF	JPN	Takaya Inui (on loan from (Japan) JEF United Chiba)
35	DF	JPN	Shoki Ohara (from Albirex Niigata Singapore)
41	GK	JPN	Kaiho Nakayama (from (Japan) Giravanz Kitakyushu)
48	FW	BRA	Halef Pitbull (on loan from (Portugal) Berço SC)
—	GK	JPN	Ryo Ishii (from (Japan) FC Ryukyu, end of loan)
—	FW	JPN	Keita Saito (from (Japan) Nagano Parceiro, end of loan)

Out: Note: Flags indicate national team as defined under FIFA eligibility rules; some limited exceptions apply. Players may hold more than one non-FIFA nationality.

No.	Pos.	Nation	Player
3	DF	JPN	Takuma Hamasaki (to (Japan) Vegalta Sendai)
7	DF	JPN	Takaaki Shichi (to (Japan) Yokohama FC)
8	MF	JPN	Hiroyuki Mae (to (Japan) Avispa Fukuoka)
9	FW	BRA	Jo (to (Brazil) CA Linense, end of loan)
14	FW	JPN	Shintaro Shimizu (to (Japan) Omiya Ardija, end of loan)
15	DF	JPN	Takuya Miyamoto (to (Japan) YSCC Yokohama)
17	MF	JPN	Takaki Fukumitsu (to (Japan) Cerezo Osaka, end of loan)
18	MF	JPN	Eiji Shirai (to (Japan) Fagiano Okayama)
19	FW	JPN	Koki Ogawa (to (Japan) Jubilo Iwata, end of loan)
21	GK	JPN	Masaaki Murakami (to (Japan) Renofa Yamaguchi, end of loan)
27	MF	JPN	Shunsuke Motegi (to (Japan) FC Ryukyu)
30	MF	BRA	Lelêu (to (Japan) Shonan Bellmare, end of loan)
31	GK	JPN	Ryo Hasegawa (on loan to (Japan) Verspah Oita)
32	MF	JPN	Atsushi Kurokawa (to (Japan) Omiya Ardija, end of loan)
36	FW	CHN	Zhou Yuye (released)
38	DF	JPN	Daiki Miya (to (Japan) Vissel Kobe, end of loan)
45	MF	JPN	Yuya Asano (to (Japan) Sanfrecce Hiroshima, end of loan)
49	DF	JPN	Shingo Kondo (released)
—	GK	JPN	Ryo Ishii (to (Japan) Zweigen Kanazawa)
—	MF	JPN	Yosuke Nakagawa (released)
—	FW	JPN	Keita Saito (to (Japan) Blaublitz Akita)

=== Kyoto Sanga ===
In: Note: Flags indicate national team as defined under FIFA eligibility rules; some limited exceptions apply. Players may hold more than one non-FIFA nationality.

No.	Pos.	Nation	Player
2	DF	JPN	Takahiro Iida (from (Japan) Shimizu S-Pulse)
8	MF	JPN	Daigo Araki (from (Japan) Jubilo Iwata)
9	FW	NGR	Peter Utaka (from (Japan) Tokushima Vortis)
11	MF	JPN	Yutaka Soneda (from (Japan) Ventforet Kofu)
14	MF	JPN	Kazaki Nakagawa (from (Japan) Yokohama F. Marinos)
18	FW	JPN	Ryunosuke Noda (from (Japan) Shonan Bellmare)
19	DF	JPN	Shogo Asada (from (Japan) Kamatamare Sanuki, end of loan)
20	FW	JPN	Tadanari Lee (from (Japan) Yokohama F. Marinos)
22	MF	JPN	Teppei Yachida (from Teikyo Nagaoka High School)
23	DF	NED	Jordy Buijs (from (Japan) Tokushima Vortis)
24	MF	JPN	Sota Kawasaki (promoted from youth ranks)
26	GK	JPN	Gakuji Ota (from (Japan) Kataller Toyama)
27	MF	JPN	Fuki Yamada (promoted from youth ranks)
33	FW	JPN	Kohei Hattori (from (Brazil) Londrina EC, end of loan)
35	DF	JPN	Genki Egawa (from (Brazil) Londrina EC, end of loan)
36	MF	JPN	Kota Ogino (from (Brazil) Londrina EC, end of loan)
40	MF	JPN	Masato Kurogi (from (Japan) V-Varen Nagasaki)
46	DF	JPN	Ryota Moriwaki (from (Japan) Urawa Red Diamonds)
—	GK	KOR	Kim Chol-ho (from (Japan) Thespakusatsu Gunma, end of loan)

Out: Note: Flags indicate national team as defined under FIFA eligibility rules; some limited exceptions apply. Players may hold more than one non-FIFA nationality.

No.	Pos.	Nation	Player
4	DF	JPN	Marcos Tulio Tanaka (retired)
8	MF	JPN	Takuya Shigehiro (to (Japan) Avispa Fukuoka)
11	MF	JPN	Yosuke Yuzawa (to (Japan) Sagan Tosu)
14	MF	JPN	Keiya Sento (to (Japan) Yokohama F. Marinos)
17	DF	JPN	Yusuke Muta (to (Japan) Iwate Grulla Morioka)
18	MF	JPN	Reo Mochizuki (to (Japan) Veertien Mie)
19	FW	JPN	Yohei Ono (on loan to (Japan) Kataller Toyama)
22	MF	JPN	Tomoya Koyamatsu (to (Japan) Sagan Tosu)
23	FW	JPN	Kazunari Ichimi (to (Japan) Gamba Osaka, end of loan)
24	DF	JPN	Takahiro Masukawa (released)
26	DF	JPN	Shogo Shimohata (to (Japan) Iwate Grulla Morioka)
39	FW	JPN	Sergio Escudero (to (Japan) Tochigi SC)
44	MF	JPN	Yuya Nakasaka (to (Japan) Vissel Kobe, end of loan)
50	MF	JPN	Jungo Fujimoto (to (Japan) Gamba Osaka, end of loan)
—	GK	KOR	Kim Chol-ho (released)
—	GK	JPN	Takanori Sugeno (to (Japan) Hokkaido Consadole Sapporo, previously on loan)
—	DF	JPN	Koki Inoue (to (Japan) Azul Claro Numazu)
—	DF	JPN	Go Iwase (to (Japan) Thespakusatsu Gunma, previously on loan)
—	MF	JPN	Takuya Shimamura (on loan to (Japan) Cerezo Osaka)

=== Fagiano Okayama ===
In: Note: Flags indicate national team as defined under FIFA eligibility rules; some limited exceptions apply. Players may hold more than one non-FIFA nationality.

No.	Pos.	Nation	Player
7	MF	JPN	Eiji Shirai (from (Japan) Mito HollyHock)
15	FW	JPN	Hiroki Yamamoto (from (Japan) Matsumoto Yamaga, previously on loan)
19	FW	JPN	Satoki Uejo (from (Japan) FC Ryukyu)
22	GK	JPN	William Popp (on loan from (Japan) Kawasaki Frontale)
25	FW	JPN	Tatsuhiko Noguchi (from Chuo University)
26	MF	BRA	Paulinho (from (Japan) Matsumoto Yamaga)
31	DF	JPN	Wakaba Shimoguchi (from (Japan) Nagano Parceiro, end of loan)
35	MF	JPN	Kyoya Yamada (promoted from youth ranks)
39	DF	JPN	Kosuke Masutani (from (Japan) FC Ryukyu, previously on loan)
41	DF	JPN	Shuhei Tokumoto (from (Japan) FC Ryukyu)
44	FW	JPN	Shintaro Shimizu (from (Japan) Omiya Ardija)

Out: Note: Flags indicate national team as defined under FIFA eligibility rules; some limited exceptions apply. Players may hold more than one non-FIFA nationality.

No.	Pos.	Nation	Player
7	FW	JPN	Seiya Nakano (to (Japan) Jubilo Iwata, end of loan)
16	MF	JPN	Shohei Takeda (on loan to (Japan) Ventforet Kofu)
19	MF	JPN	Hayato Nakama (to (Japan) Kashiwa Reysol)
22	GK	JPN	Jun Ichimori (to (Japan) Gamba Osaka)
25	MF	JPN	Kazune Kubota (to (Japan) Kashima Antlers, end of loan)
26	MF	JPN	Kentaro Matsumoto (to (Japan) Iwaki FC)
37	MF	JPN	Yasufumi Nishimura (to (Japan) Shimizu S-Pulse, end of loan)

=== Albirex Niigata ===
In: Note: Flags indicate national team as defined under FIFA eligibility rules; some limited exceptions apply. Players may hold more than one non-FIFA nationality.

No.	Pos.	Nation	Player
3	DF	ARG	Mauro dos Santos (on loan from (Spain) CD Tenerife)
9	FW	BRA	Fábio (from (Brazil) Oeste FC)
16	MF	URU	Gonzalo González (from (Uruguay) CA Juventud)
19	FW	URU	Pedro Manzi (from (India) Chennai City FC)
20	MF	JPN	Yuzuru Shimada (on loan from (Japan) V-Varen Nagasaki)
21	GK	JPN	Koto Abe (from University of Tsukuba)
22	GK	JPN	Ryosuke Kojima (on loan from (Japan) Oita Trinita)
24	MF	PER	Romero Frank (from (Japan) Machida Zelvia)
27	MF	JPN	Yuki Omoto (from (Japan) V-Varen Nagasaki)
39	FW	JPN	Ken Yamura (from Niigata University of Health and Welfare)
50	DF	JPN	Daichi Tagami (on loan from (Japan) Kashiwa Reysol)
—	MF	JPN	Masaru Kato (from (Japan) Avispa Fukuoka, end of loan)

Out: Note: Flags indicate national team as defined under FIFA eligibility rules; some limited exceptions apply. Players may hold more than one non-FIFA nationality.

No.	Pos.	Nation	Player
2	DF	JPN	Kenta Hirose (to (Japan) Nagano Parceiro)
3	DF	BRA	Paulão (released)
4	DF	JPN	Shun Obu (to (Japan) Jubilo Iwata)
6	MF	JPN	Sachiro Toshima (to (Japan) Kashiwa Reysol)
7	MF	BRA	Samuel Santos (to (Brazil) Juventude)
9	FW	JPN	Leonardo (to (Japan) Urawa Red Diamonds)
13	FW	BRA	Francis (to (Brazil) Botafogo FC)
17	MF	BRA	Cauê (released)
18	MF	JPN	Ryoma Watanabe (to (Japan) Montedio Yamagata)
19	FW	JPN	Kisho Yano (to (Japan) Tochigi SC)
21	GK	JPN	Yosuke Nozawa (retired)
23	DF	JPN	Yasutaka Yanagi (on loan to (Japan) Tochigi SC)
30	GK	JPN	Junto Taguchi (to (Japan) FC Ryukyu)
38	MF	KOR	Cho Young-cheol (to (Japan) FC Tiamo Hirakata)
40	MF	JPN	Yoshizumi Ogawa (retired)
—	DF	JPN	Naoki Kawaguchi (to (Japan) Kashiwa Reysol, previously on loan)
—	MF	JPN	Masaru Kato (on loan to (Japan) V-Varen Nagasaki)
—	FW	JPN	Shu Hiramatsu (to (Japan) Kataller Toyama, previously on loan)

=== Zweigen Kanazawa ===
In: Note: Flags indicate national team as defined under FIFA eligibility rules; some limited exceptions apply. Players may hold more than one non-FIFA nationality.

No.	Pos.	Nation	Player
2	DF	JPN	Masayuki Yamada (on loan from (Japan) FC Tokyo)
9	FW	BRA	Lucão (on loan from (Japan) Kagoshima United FC)
16	MF	JPN	Toshiya Motozuka (from Kanazawa Seiryo University)
17	FW	JPN	Mutsuki Kato (from Chuo University)
20	MF	JPN	Megumu Nishida (from Osaka University of Health & Sport Sciences)
21	GK	JPN	Ryo Ishii (from (Japan) Mito HollyHock)
25	DF	JPN	Takayuki Takayasu (from Kokoku High School)
26	MF	JPN	Yosuke Toji (from Kokoku High School)
29	DF	BRA	Rodolfo (from (Brazil) Metropolitano)
31	GK	JPN	Itsuki Ueda (promoted from youth ranks)
34	DF	JPN	Hayate Sugii (on loan from (Japan) Kashiwa Reysol)
39	DF	JPN	Yota Shimokawa (on loan from (Japan) Matsumoto Yamaga)

Out: Note: Flags indicate national team as defined under FIFA eligibility rules; some limited exceptions apply. Players may hold more than one non-FIFA nationality.

No.	Pos.	Nation	Player
1	GK	JPN	Masaaki Goto (to (Japan) Shonan Bellmare, end of loan)
2	DF	JPN	Norimichi Yamamoto (to (Japan) Yokohama F. Marinos)
5	DF	BRA	Allan (to (Brazil) Esperanza SC)
7	MF	JPN	Shohei Kiyohara (to (Japan) SC Sagamihara)
9	FW	JPN	Ren Komatsu (to (Japan) Matsumoto Yamaga, end of loan)
10	FW	JPN	Yuki Kakita (to (Japan) Kashima Antlers, end of loan)
17	MF	JPN	Taiki Kato (to (Japan) Montedio Yamagata)
21	GK	JPN	Yoshiaki Arai (to (Japan) Shimizu S-Pulse, end of loan)
22	FW	CRC	Giovanni Clunie (to (Costa Rica) C.S. Cartaginés, end of loan)
25	DF	JPN	Masaya Kojima (to (Japan) Vegalta Sendai, end of loan)
33	MF	JPN	Takahide Umebachi (to (Japan) SC Sagamihara)
45	DF	JPN	Keigo Numata (to (Japan) FC Ryukyu)
—	DF	JPN	Kodai Enomoto (to (Japan) Ococias Kyoto AC)
—	FW	JPN	Ryoya Taniguchi (to Albirex Niigata Singapore)

=== V-Varen Nagasaki ===
In: Note: Flags indicate national team as defined under FIFA eligibility rules; some limited exceptions apply. Players may hold more than one non-FIFA nationality.

No.	Pos.	Nation	Player
4	DF	BRA	Freire (from (Japan) Shonan Bellmare)
9	FW	JPN	Cayman Togashi (from (Japan) Machida Zelvia)
10	MF	BRA	Luan (from (Brazil) Atletico Mineiro)
13	MF	JPN	Masaru Kato (on loan from (Japan) Albirex Niigata)
15	DF	JPN	Hijiri Kato (from JFA Academy Fukushima U18)
16	FW	JPN	Seiya Maikuma (from Momoyama Gakuin University)
17	MF	JPN	Hiroki Akino (from (Japan) Shonan Bellmare, previously on loan)
18	MF	JPN	Ryoma Kida (from Senshu University)
21	GK	JPN	Toru Takagiwa (on loan from (Japan) Shimizu S-Pulse)
26	DF	JPN	Hiroshi Futami (from (Japan) Shimizu S-Pulse)
32	FW	COL	Victor Ibarbo (from (Japan) Sagan Tosu, previously on loan)
33	FW	JPN	Asahi Uenaka (from JFA Academy Fukushima U18)

Out: Note: Flags indicate national team as defined under FIFA eligibility rules; some limited exceptions apply. Players may hold more than one non-FIFA nationality.

No.	Pos.	Nation	Player
2	DF	JPN	Yuki Kagawa (to (Japan) Oita Trinita)
4	DF	JPN	Ryota Takasugi (to (Japan) Tochigi SC)
7	MF	JPN	Shuto Kono (to (Australia) Sydney Olympic FC)
9	FW	KOR	Lee Jong-ho (to (South Korea) Ulsan Hyundai FC, end of loan)
10	MF	JPN	Masato Kurogi (to (Japan) Kyoto Sanga)
14	MF	JPN	Hokuto Nakamura (retired)
15	MF	JPN	Yuzuru Shimada (on loan to (Japan) Albirex Niigata)
17	FW	JPN	Yu Hasegawa (to (Australia) Wollongong Olympic FC)
25	GK	JPN	Ayaki Suzuki (retired)
26	DF	KOR	Lee Sang-min (to (South Korea) Ulsan Hyundai FC)
28	MF	JPN	Hijiri Onaga (to (Japan) Omiya Ardija)
33	FW	JPN	Hiroto Goya (to (Japan) Gamba Osaka, end of loan)
41	MF	JPN	Yuki Omoto (to (Japan) Albirex Niigata)
—	DF	KOR	Choi Kyu-baek (to (South Korea) Suwon FC)
—	DF	JPN	Takuto Honda (to (Japan) Verspah Oita, previously on loan)
—	MF	JPN	Teppei Usui (to (Japan) Kataller Toyama, previously on loan)
—	MF	JPN	Ryosuke Hayashida (released)

=== Tokyo Verdy ===
In: Note: Flags indicate national team as defined under FIFA eligibility rules; some limited exceptions apply. Players may hold more than one non-FIFA nationality.

No.	Pos.	Nation	Player
6	DF	JPN	Shohei Takahashi (on loan from (Japan) Jubilo Iwata)
7	MF	JPN	Hiroki Kawano (from (Japan) Sagan Tosu, previously on loan)
11	MF	JPN	Haruya Ide (from (Japan) Montedio Yamagata)
13	FW	JPN	Yoshito Okubo (from (Japan) Jubilo Iwata)
15	MF	JPN	Masaomi Nakano (from (Japan) FC Imabari, end of loan)
16	DF	JPN	Takayuki Fukumura (from (Japan) Gainare Tottori)
18	MF	JPN	Mizuki Arai (from (Japan) Kataller Toyama, previously on loan)
25	FW	JPN	Jin Hanato (from (Japan) Shonan Bellmare, previously on loan)
26	DF	JPN	Daiki Fukazawa (from Chuo University)
27	FW	JPN	Ryohei Hayashi (from (Japan) Machida Zelvia, end of loan)
30	MF	JPN	Mahiro Ano (promoted from youth ranks)
31	GK	BRA	Matheus Vidotto (from (Brazil) Figueirense FC)
33	MF	JPN	Yuan Matsuhashi (promoted from youth ranks)
34	MF	JPN	Taiga Ishiura (promoted from youth ranks)
35	DF	JPN	Seiya Baba (promoted from youth ranks)
36	MF	JPN	Joel Chimba Fujita (promoted from youth ranks)
48	FW	JPN	Ryoya Yamashita (from Nippon Sport Science University)

Out: Note: Flags indicate national team as defined under FIFA eligibility rules; some limited exceptions apply. Players may hold more than one non-FIFA nationality.

No.	Pos.	Nation	Player
8	MF	JPN	Tatsuya Uchida (to (Japan) Thespakusatsu Gunma)
11	FW	BRA	Jaílton Paraíba (released)
15	DF	JPN	Tatsuya Anzai (on loan to (Japan) Azul Claro Numazu)
19	DF	PRK	Ri Yong-jik (to (Japan) FC Ryukyu)
21	GK	JPN	Naoto Kamifukumoto (to (Japan) Tokushima Vortis)
22	DF	JPN	Takuya Nagata (on loan to (Japan) Giravanz Kitakyushu)
23	MF	JPN	Naoya Tamura (retired)
26	GK	JPN	Tomoyuki Suzuki (to (Japan) Iwate Grulla Morioka)
30	FW	BRA	Walmerson (to (Brazil) Colorado AC, end of loan)
38	MF	JPN	Ryota Kajikawa (to (Japan) Tokushima Vortis)
50	FW	KOR	Kang Soo-il (to (Thailand) Trat FC)

=== FC Ryukyu ===
In: Note: Flags indicate national team as defined under FIFA eligibility rules; some limited exceptions apply. Players may hold more than one non-FIFA nationality.

No.	Pos.	Nation	Player
5	DF	BRA	Felipe Tavares (from (Brazil) Anápolis)
8	MF	JPN	Koya Kazama (from (Japan) FC Gifu, previously on loan)
9	DF	PRK	Ri Yong-jik (from (Japan) Tokyo Verdy)
14	DF	JPN	Keigo Numata (from (Japan) Zweigen Kanazawa)
15	DF	JPN	Tetsuya Chinen (from Kindai University)
16	FW	JPN	Takuma Abe (from (Japan) Vegalta Sendai)
18	FW	JPN	Kazuki Yamaguchi (from (Japan) Shonan Bellmare)
19	FW	JPN	Takuya Hitomi (from Rissho University)
23	MF	JPN	Ren Ikeda (from Takushoku University)
24	DF	JPN	Daisei Suzuki (on loan from (Japan) Tokushima Vortis)
25	MF	KOR	Lee Ji-seong (from (South Korea) Tangwon University)
26	GK	JPN	Junto Taguchi (from (Japan) Albirex Niigata)
27	MF	JPN	Shunsuke Motegi (from (Japan) Mito HollyHock)

Out: Note: Flags indicate national team as defined under FIFA eligibility rules; some limited exceptions apply. Players may hold more than one non-FIFA nationality.

No.	Pos.	Nation	Player
3	DF	JPN	Taishi Nishioka (to (Japan) Ehime FC)
5	DF	JPN	Shuhei Tokumoto (to (Japan) Fagiano Okayama)
8	MF	JPN	Hayata Komatsu (to (Japan) Montedio Yamagata)
9	FW	JPN	Hiroto Yamada (to (Japan) Cerezo Osaka, end of loan)
14	FW	JPN	Satoki Uejo (to (Japan) Fagiano Okayama)
16	DF	JPN	Jumpei Arai (retired)
18	DF	JPN	Yuki Miyauchi (to (Japan) Tokyo United FC)
19	MF	JPN	Ryosuke Ochi (to (Japan) FC Imabari)
21	GK	JPN	Ryo Ishii (to (Japan) Mito HollyHock, end of loan)
22	FW	JPN	Yukihide Gibo (on loan to (Japan) Tegevajaro Miyazaki)
24	MF	JPN	Sho Otsuka (released)
26	DF	JPN	Rion Fukui (released)
27	FW	JPN	Ryoto Iguchi (released)
29	FW	JPN	Tomoki Yonashiro (released)
30	DF	JPN	Shogo Nishikawa (retired)
32	DF	JPN	Kenta Naito (to (Japan) Arterivo Wakayama)
34	MF	BRA	Ramon (on loan to (Japan) Gainare Tottori)
35	DF	JPN	Minoru Hanafusa (to (Japan) YSCC Yokohama)
—	DF	JPN	Kosuke Masutani (to (Japan) Fagiano Okayama, previously on loan)
—	MF	KOR	Kim Song-sun (released)

=== Renofa Yamaguchi ===
In: Note: Flags indicate national team as defined under FIFA eligibility rules; some limited exceptions apply. Players may hold more than one non-FIFA nationality.

No.	Pos.	Nation	Player
1	GK	JPN	Mizuki Hayashi (on loan from (Japan) Gamba Osaka)
2	DF	JPN	Kosuke Kikuchi (from (Japan) Omiya Ardija)
4	DF	BRA	Sandro (from (Brazil) Criciuma EC)
8	MF	JPN	Kazuya Murata (on loan from (Japan) Kashiwa Reysol)
9	FW	BRA	Iury (on loan from (Portugal) Portimonense)
16	FW	JPN	Kensei Ukita (from Juntendo University)
18	FW	JPN	Ren Komatsu (on loan from (Japan) Matsumoto Yamaga)
19	FW	JPN	Kota Mori (from (Japan) Ventforet Kofu)
21	MF	JPN	Shuntaro Koga (from (Latvia) FK Auda)
23	DF	JPN	Ryosei Ito (promoted from youth ranks)
24	DF	JPN	Kazuki Anzai (on loan from (Japan) Sagan Tosu)
27	DF	JPN	Reo Kunimoto (from Gyosei Kokusai High School)
28	DF	JPN	Hikaru Manabe (from Toin University of Yokohama)
29	MF	JPN	Riku Tanaka (on loan from (Japan) Kashiwa Reysol)
30	MF	BRA	Henik (from (Japan) Tochigi SC)
38	FW	JPN	Kota Kawano (promoted from youth ranks)
41	DF	JPN	Yuto Takeoka (from (Japan) Ventforet Kofu)
—	GK	JPN	Masaaki Murakami (from (Japan) Mito HollyHock, end of loan)

Out: Note: Flags indicate national team as defined under FIFA eligibility rules; some limited exceptions apply. Players may hold more than one non-FIFA nationality.

No.	Pos.	Nation	Player
1	GK	JPN	Takumi Nagaishi (to (Japan) Cerezo Osaka, end of loan)
2	DF	JPN	Keisuke Tsuboi (retired)
6	DF	JPN	Takayuki Mae (to (Japan) Yokohama F. Marinos)
8	MF	JPN	Takumi Sasaki (to (Japan) Vegalta Sendai, end of loan)
9	FW	JPN	Kazuhito Kishida (on loan to (Japan) Iwate Grulla Morioka)
15	DF	UZB	Doston Tursunov (to (South Korea) Busan IPark)
19	FW	JPN	Masato Kudo (to (Japan) Sanfrecce Hiroshima, end of loan)
24	FW	JPN	Keita Yamashita (to (Japan) JEF United Chiba)
28	DF	JPN	Ryoma Ishida (to (Japan) Jubilo Iwata, end of loan)
29	MF	JPN	Hidetoshi Miyuki (to (Japan) Shonan Bellmare)
38	FW	JPN	Taisei Miyashiro (to (Japan) Kawasaki Frontale, end of loan)
40	MF	JPN	Kazuya Onohara (to (Portugal) Oliveirense)
49	DF	JPN	Ryuho Kikuchi (to (Japan) Vissel Kobe)
50	GK	JPN	Riku Hirosue (to (Japan) FC Tokyo, end of loan)
—	GK	JPN	Masaaki Murakami (to (Japan) Avispa Fukuoka)
—	GK	JPN	Eisuke Fujishima (to (Japan) Kawasaki Frontale, previously on loan)
—	DF	JPN	Kodai Watanabe (to (Japan) Thespakusatsu Gunma, previously on loan)
—	DF	JPN	Takahiro Tanaka (to (Singapore) Tanjong Pagar United FC)

=== Avispa Fukuoka ===
In: Note: Flags indicate national team as defined under FIFA eligibility rules; some limited exceptions apply. Players may hold more than one non-FIFA nationality.

No.	Pos.	Nation	Player
2	DF	JPN	Masato Yuzawa (from (Japan) Ventforet Kofu)
3	DF	SWE	Emil Salomonsson (on loan from (Japan) Sanfrecce Hiroshima)
4	DF	ESP	Carlos Gutiérrez (from (Spain) CD Numancia)
6	MF	JPN	Hiroyuki Mae (from (Japan) Mito Hollyhock)
7	MF	JPN	Takuya Shigehiro (from (Japan) Kyoto Sanga)
9	FW	ESP	Juanma Delgado (from (Japan) Omiya Ardija)
14	MF	JPN	Asahi Masuyama (on loan from (Japan) Vissel Kobe)
17	MF	JPN	Takaki Fukumitsu (on loan from (Japan) Cerezo Osaka)
18	FW	JPN	Toshiki Toya (from Chukyo University)
26	FW	JPN	Daiya Tono (on loan from (Japan) Kawasaki Frontale)
31	GK	JPN	Masaaki Murakami (from (Japan) Renofa Yamaguchi)
33	DF	BRA	Douglas Grolli (from (Portugal) Maritimo)
38	MF	JPN	Daisuke Kikuchi (on loan from (Japan) Kashiwa Reysol)
50	DF	JPN	Takumi Kamijima (on loan from (Japan) Kashiwa Reysol)

Out: Note: Flags indicate national team as defined under FIFA eligibility rules; some limited exceptions apply. Players may hold more than one non-FIFA nationality.

No.	Pos.	Nation	Player
3	DF	JPN	Hirokazu Ishihara (to (Japan) Shonan Bellmare, end of loan)
4	DF	JPN	Masayuki Yamada (to (Japan) FC Tokyo, end of loan)
6	DF	KOR	Won Du-jae (to (South Korea) Ulsan Hyundai FC)
9	FW	KOR	Yang Dong-hyen (to (South Korea) Seongnam FC)
14	MF	JPN	Taiga Maekawa (to (Japan) Cerezo Osaka, end of loan)
17	FW	JPN	Riki Matsuda (to (Japan) Ventforet Kofu)
18	FW	COL	Felix Micolta (to (Mexico) Puebla FC)
21	MF	JPN	Kazuya Murata (to (Japan) Kashiwa Reysol, end of loan)
26	MF	JPN	Hinata Kida (to (Japan) Cerezo Osaka, end of loan)
28	MF	JPN	Masaru Kato (to (Japan) Albirex Niigata, end of loan)
35	DF	JPN	Ryo Hatsuse (to (Japan) Vissel Kobe, end of loan)
36	DF	JPN	Naoya Kikuchi (retired)
—	DF	JPN	Keisuke Iwashita (to (Japan) Sagan Tosu, previously on loan)

=== JEF United Chiba ===
In: Note: Flags indicate national team as defined under FIFA eligibility rules; some limited exceptions apply. Players may hold more than one non-FIFA nationality.

No.	Pos.	Nation	Player
1	GK	JPN	Shota Arai (from (Japan) Kawasaki Frontale)
3	DF	JPN	Jun Okano (from (Japan) Oita Trinita, end of loan)
4	MF	JPN	Taishi Taguchi (from (Japan) Júbilo Iwata)
5	DF	JPN	Tatsuya Masushima (from (Japan) Kashiwa Reysol, previously on loan)
9	FW	BRA	Kléber (from (Portugal) Estoril, previously on loan)
15	DF	KOR	Jang Ming-gyu (from Hanyang University)
17	DF	JPN	Ikki Arai (from (Japan) Nagoya Grampus, previously on loan)
24	FW	JPN	Keita Yamashita (from (Japan) Renofa Yamaguchi)
31	GK	JPN	Ryota Suzuki (from (Japan) Gamba Osaka, previously on loan)
32	MF	JPN	Issei Takahashi (from (Japan) Montedio Yamagata, end of loan)
40	FW	JPN	Solomon Sakuragawa (promoted from youth ranks)
44	FW	JPN	Kengo Kawamata (from (Japan) Júbilo Iwata)
50	DF	JPN	Koki Yonekura (from (Japan) Gamba Osaka, previously on loan)
—	DF	JPN	Danto Sugiyama (from (Japan) Kataller Toyama, end of loan)
—	DF	JPN	Yushi Mizubochi (from (Japan) Matsumoto Yamaga, end of loan)
—	MF	JPN	Tomoya Miki (from Kanto Gakuin University)

Out: Note: Flags indicate national team as defined under FIFA eligibility rules; some limited exceptions apply. Players may hold more than one non-FIFA nationality.

No.	Pos.	Nation	Player
3	DF	VEN	Williams Velásquez (to (England) Watford, end of loan)
4	DF	BRA	Hebert (to (Poland) Wisla Krakow)
7	MF	JPN	Yuto Sato (retired)
25	MF	JPN	Yusuke Chajima (to (Japan) Sanfrecce Hiroshima, end of loan)
28	DF	JPN	Takaya Inui (on loan to (Japan) Mito HollyHock)
31	GK	JPN	Ono Cholhwan (on loan to (Japan) Tochigi SC)
—	GK	JPN	Masahiro Okamoto (to (Japan) Ehime FC, previously on loan)
—	DF	JPN	Yushi Mizubochi (on loan to (Japan) Tochigi SC)
—	DF	JPN	Danto Sugiyama (on loan to (Japan) Kamatamare Sanuki)
—	MF	JPN	Masaki Yamamoto (to (Japan) Matsumoto Yamaga, previously on loan)
—	FW	JPN	Makito Yoshida (to (Japan) Ehime FC, previously on loan)

=== Machida Zelvia ===
In: Note: Flags indicate national team as defined under FIFA eligibility rules; some limited exceptions apply. Players may hold more than one non-FIFA nationality.

No.	Pos.	Nation	Player
1	GK	JPN	Yota Akimoto (on loan from (Japan) Shonan Bellmare)
4	DF	JPN	Hiroki Mizumoto (on loan from (Japan) Sanfrecce Hiroshima)
7	FW	SRB	Alen Mašović (from (Serbia) FK Vozdovac)
9	FW	SRB	Stefan Šćepović (from (Poland) Jagiellonia Bialystok)
14	MF	JPN	Kaina Yoshio (on loan from (Japan) Yokohama F. Marinos)
18	MF	JPN	Leo Takae (on loan from (Japan) Gamba Osaka)
22	DF	JPN	Itsuki Oda (on loan from (Japan) Kashima Antlers)
27	FW	JPN	Misaki Haruyama (from Teikyo Nagaoka High School)
31	GK	JPN	Riku Hirosue (on loan from (Japan) FC Tokyo)
—	DF	KOR	Jung Han-cheol (from (Japan) YSCC Yokohama, end of loan)

Out: Note: Flags indicate national team as defined under FIFA eligibility rules; some limited exceptions apply. Players may hold more than one non-FIFA nationality.

No.	Pos.	Nation	Player
3	DF	JPN	Kodai Fujii (to (Japan) Iwate Grulla Morioka)
7	MF	JPN	Go Hayama (to (Australia) Sydney Olympic FC)
9	FW	JPN	Cayman Togashi (to (Japan) V-Varen Nagasaki)
11	FW	JPN	Hirofumi Yamauchi (to (Japan) Cerezo Osaka, end of loan)
13	GK	JPN	Takuya Masuda (to (Japan) Sanfrecce Hiroshima, end of loan)
14	MF	JPN	Noboru Shimura (to (Serbia) FK Spartak Subotica)
22	FW	JPN	Ryohei Hayashi (to (Japan) Tokyo Verdy, end of loan)
24	MF	PER	Romero Frank (to (Japan) Albirex Niigata)
27	DF	JPN	So Hirao (to (Japan) Thespakusatsu Gunma)
31	GK	JPN	Kenta Watanabe (on loan to (Japan) Fukushima United FC)
32	MF	JPN	Hiroki Todaka (to (Japan) Kataller Toyama)
40	DF	JPN	Yuki Kobayashi (to (Japan) Vissel Kobe, end of loan)
—	DF	KOR	Jung Han-cheol (to (Japan) FC Imabari)

=== Ehime FC ===
In: Note: Flags indicate national team as defined under FIFA eligibility rules; some limited exceptions apply. Players may hold more than one non-FIFA nationality.

No.	Pos.	Nation	Player
1	GK	JPN	Masahiro Okamoto (from (Japan) JEF United Chiba, previously on loan)
3	DF	JPN	Taishi Nishioka (from (Japan) FC Ryukyu)
6	MF	ESP	Sisinio (from (Japan) Tokushima Vortis)
7	MF	JPN	Shigeru Yokotani (from (Japan) Ventforet Kofu)
11	MF	JPN	Kentaro Moriya (on loan from (Japan) Jubilo Iwata)
14	FW	JPN	Makito Yoshida (from (Japan) JEF United Chiba, previously on loan)
19	MF	JPN	Kyoji Kutsuna (from Biwako Seikei Sport College)
20	DF	JPN	Rikiya Motegi (from (Japan) Urawa Red Diamonds, previously on loan)
21	GK	JPN	Taichi Kato (from Meiji University)
23	DF	JPN	Shuma Mihara (promoted from youth ranks)
24	DF	JPN	Jurato Ikeda (from (Japan) Nagano Parceiro, end of loan)
30	GK	JPN	Shugo Tsuji (from (Japan) Yokohama FC)
32	DF	JPN	Haruki Yoshida (from Teikyo Nagaoka High School)
34	MF	JPN	Kazuhito Watanabe (from (Japan) Yokohama FC)

Out: Note: Flags indicate national team as defined under FIFA eligibility rules; some limited exceptions apply. Players may hold more than one non-FIFA nationality.

No.	Pos.	Nation	Player
3	DF	JPN	Mutsumi Tamabayashi (to (Japan) Artista Asama)
6	MF	JPN	Hideyuki Nozawa (to (Japan) FC Tokyo, end of loan)
7	MF	JPN	Takashi Kondo (to (Japan) Omiya Ardija)
10	FW	JPN	Yuta Kamiya (to (Japan) Shonan Bellmare, end of loan)
11	MF	JPN	Yumemi Kanda (to (Japan) Tokyo 23 FC)
20	FW	JPN	Kazuhisa Kawahara (retired)
23	DF	JPN	Makoto Rindo (to (Japan) Kataller Toyama)
30	MF	KOR	Woo Sang-ho (to (Japan) Tochigi SC)
31	GK	KOR	Park Seong-su (on loan to (Japan) FC Gifu)
39	DF	JPN	Yota Shimokawa (to (Japan) Matsumoto Yamaga, end of loan)
50	DF	AUT	Mladen Jutrić (to (Cyprus) Doxa Katokopias FC)
—	GK	JPN	Hiroki Mawatari (to (Japan) Kawasaki Frontale, previously on loan)

=== Tochigi SC ===
In: Note: Flags indicate national team as defined under FIFA eligibility rules; some limited exceptions apply. Players may hold more than one non-FIFA nationality.

No.	Pos.	Nation	Player
4	DF	JPN	Ryota Takasugi (from (Japan) V-Varen Nagasaki)
8	MF	JPN	Takahiro Akimoto (from Kokushikan University)
9	FW	JPN	Sergio Escudero (from (Japan) Kyoto Sanga FC)
13	MF	KOR	Woo Sang-ho (from (Japan) Ehime FC)
15	DF	JPN	Yushi Mizubochi (on loan from (Japan) JEF United Chiba)
17	MF	JPN	Tatsumi Sotome (from (Japan) Blancdieu Hirosaki FC, end of loan)
18	MF	JPN	Toshiki Mori (from Hosei University)
20	FW	JPN	Han Yong-thae (on loan from (Japan) Matsumoto Yamaga)
22	GK	JPN	Hitoshi Shiota (from (Japan) Omiya Ardija)
25	MF	JPN	Sho Sato (from (Japan) Thespakusatsu Gunma)
29	FW	JPN	Kisho Yano (from (Japan) Albirex Niigata)
31	GK	JPN	Ono Cholhwan (on loan from (Japan) JEF United Chiba)
34	FW	JPN	Kotaro Arima (on loan from (Japan) Kashima Antlers)
37	MF	JPN	Ren Yamamoto (from (Japan) Arterivo Wakayama, end of loan)
—	DF	JPN	Seiji Kawakami (from (Japan) SC Sagamihara, end of loan)
—	DF	JPN	Yasutaka Yanagi (on loan from (Japan) Albirex Niigata)

Out: Note: Flags indicate national team as defined under FIFA eligibility rules; some limited exceptions apply. Players may hold more than one non-FIFA nationality.

No.	Pos.	Nation	Player
4	DF	JPN	Kotaro Fujiwara (on loan to (Japan) Kagoshima United FC)
5	MF	BRA	Henik (to (Japan) Renofa Yamaguchi)
6	MF	JPN	Tatsuki Kohatsu (to (Japan) Tochigi City FC)
8	FW	JPN	Koji Hirose (retired)
10	MF	JPN	Kazuki Nishiya (to (Japan) Tokushima Vortis)
15	DF	JPN	Reiya Morishita (to (Japan) Cerezo Osaka, end of loan)
18	DF	JPN	Ryota Sakata (retired)
25	MF	BRA	Yuri (to (Brazil) EC Bahia, end of loan)
26	MF	JPN	Takuma Edamura (to (Japan) Fujieda MYFC)
27	DF	JPN	Ryosuke Hisadomi (to (Japan) Fujieda MYFC)
29	MF	JPN	Kento Kawata (to (Japan) Omiya Ardija, end of loan)
31	MF	JPN	Kaito Miyake (to (Japan) Kagoshima United FC)
35	GK	JPN	Suguru Asanuma (to (Japan) SC Sagamihara, end of loan)
36	DF	JPN	Daichi Inui (to (Japan) Yokohama FC, end of loan)
37	MF	JPN	Akira Hamashita (to (Japan) Tokushima Vortis)
40	MF	JPN	Shinichi Terada (to (Japan) Ococias Kyoto AC)
42	FW	KOR	Lee Ran-jun (to (South Korea) Ansan Greeners)
44	DF	JPN	Kensuke Fukuda (to (Japan) Ococias Kyoto AC)
47	FW	KOR	Kim Hyun (to (South Korea) Jeju United FC, end of loan)
50	GK	KOR	Yoo Hyun (to (South Korea) Suwon FC)
—	DF	JPN	Seiji Kawakami (to (Australia) Wollongong United FC)

=== Giravanz Kitakyushu ===
In: Note: Flags indicate national team as defined under FIFA eligibility rules; some limited exceptions apply. Players may hold more than one non-FIFA nationality.

No.	Pos.	Nation	Player
16	DF	JPN	Kota Muramatsu (from Juntendo University)
18	FW	JPN	Shuto Machino (from (Japan) Yokohama F. Marinos, previously on loan)
19	MF	JPN	Yudai Nagato (from Hannan University)
23	FW	JPN	Ryo Sato (from Meiji University)
26	MF	JPN	Toshiki Onozawa (from (Japan) Cerezo Osaka)
28	FW	JPN	Kunitomo Suzuki (on loan from (Japan) Shonan Bellmare)
29	DF	JPN	Yoshiki Sato (from Toin University of Yokohama)
31	GK	JPN	Kengo Nagai (on loan from (Japan) Matsumoto Yamaga)
32	DF	JPN	Takuya Nagata (on loan from (Japan) Tokyo Verdy)

Out: Note: Flags indicate national team as defined under FIFA eligibility rules; some limited exceptions apply. Players may hold more than one non-FIFA nationality.

No.	Pos.	Nation	Player
1	GK	JPN	Kaiho Nakayama (to (Japan) Mito HollyHock)
7	MF	JPN	Taira Shige (to (Japan) Blaublitz Akita)
10	MF	JPN	Shota Inoue (to (Japan) FC Tiamo Hirakata)
19	MF	JPN	Daichi Kawashima (released)
23	MF	JPN	Ryuto Kito (to (Japan) Suzuka Unlimited FC)
26	DF	JPN	Taiki Uchikoshi (to (Japan) Boso Rovers Kisarazu FC)
30	FW	JPN	Shuto Kitagawa (to (Japan) Montedio Yamagata, end of loan)
43	MF	JPN	Masashi Motoyama (released)

=== Thespakusatsu Gunma ===
In: Note: Flags indicate national team as defined under FIFA eligibility rules; some limited exceptions apply. Players may hold more than one non-FIFA nationality.

No.	Pos.	Nation	Player
1	GK	JPN	Keiki Shimizu (from (Japan) Omiya Ardija)
4	DF	JPN	Daihachi Okamura (from (Japan) Tegevajaro Miyazaki, end of loan)
8	MF	JPN	Yuzo Iwakami (from (Japan) Matsumoto Yamaga)
14	DF	JPN	So Hirao (from (Japan) Machida Zelvia)
17	MF	JPN	Atsuki Yamanaka (from (Japan) Urawa Red Diamonds)
18	FW	JPN	Kohei Shin (from (Japan) YSCC Yokohama)
19	MF	JPN	Tomoyuki Shiraishi (from (Japan) Kataller Toyama)
21	GK	JPN	Shuhei Matsubara (from (Japan) Shonan Bellmare)
23	DF	JPN	Go Iwase (from (Japan) Kyoto Sanga FC, previously on loan)
25	DF	JPN	Masaya Kojima (from (Japan) Vegalta Sendai)
32	DF	JPN	Kodai Watanabe (from (Japan) Renofa Yamaguchi, previously on loan)
35	MF	JPN	Masaki Miyasaka (from (Japan) Matsumoto Yamaga)
37	GK	JPN	Keita Toyama (from Ritsumeikan University)
39	DF	JPN	Yuko Takase (from (Japan) Roasso Kumamoto)
40	MF	JPN	Tatsuya Uchida (from (Japan) Tokyo Verdy)
41	MF	JPN	Yuto Nakayama (from (Japan) Roasso Kumamoto)
46	DF	JPN	Yuki Kawakami (from Meiji University)
50	FW	JPN	Genki Omae (from (Japan) Omiya Ardija)
—	DF	JPN	Masato Fujiwara (from (Japan) Azul Claro Numazu, end of loan)

Out: Note: Flags indicate national team as defined under FIFA eligibility rules; some limited exceptions apply. Players may hold more than one non-FIFA nationality.

No.	Pos.	Nation	Player
5	DF	JPN	Tsubasa Aoki (to (Japan) FC Gifu, end of loan)
6	MF	JPN	Sho Sato (to (Japan) Tochigi SC)
8	MF	JPN	Ryo Kubota (to (Japan) SC Sagamihara)
11	FW	JPN	Masao Tsuji (released)
13	DF	JPN	Shingo Kukita (retired)
17	FW	JPN	Yuya Takazawa (to (Japan) Oita Trinita)
18	FW	JPN	Shunta Nakamura (to (Japan) Montedio Yamagata, end of loan)
19	DF	JPN	Masaya Yoshida (to (Japan) Matsumoto Yamaga)
20	FW	JPN	Takuya Iwata (to (Japan) Tokyo United FC)
21	GK	KOR	Kim Chol-ho (to (Japan) Kyoto Sanga FC, end of loan)
23	GK	JPN	Shun Yoshida (to (Japan) Oita Trinita)
27	FW	JPN	Itsuki Enomoto (to (Japan) Matsumoto Yamaga, end of loan)
28	DF	JPN	Kensuke Fukuda (to (Japan) Aventura Kawaguchi)
30	MF	JPN	Yuya Himeno (to (Japan) Oita Trinita, end of loan)
39	DF	JPN	Yu Tamura (to (Japan) Montedio Yamagata, end of loan)
41	MF	JPN	Kyosuke Goto (to (Japan) Ventforet Kofu, end of loan)
50	MF	JPN	Daisuke Sakai (to (Japan) Oita Trinita, end of loan)
—	GK	JPN	Yuto Koizumi (to (Japan) Ventforet Kofu, previously on loan)
—	DF	JPN	Masato Fujiwara (released)
—	MF	JPN	Kento Kato (to (Japan) Arterivo Wakayama)
