= List of J2 League football transfers summer 2019 =

This is a list of Japanese football J2 League transfers in the summer transfer window 2019 by club.

== J2 League ==
=== Kashiwa Reysol ===
In: Note: Flags indicate national team as defined under FIFA eligibility rules; some limited exceptions apply. Players may hold more than one non-FIFA nationality.

| No. | Pos. | Nation | Player |
|---|---|---|---|
| 22 | MF | BRA | Matheus Sávio (on loan from (Brazil) CR Flamengo) |
| 27 | MF | JPN | Masatoshi Mihara (from (Japan) Vissel Kobe) |
| 31 | FW | BRA | Júnior Santos (from (Brazil) Ituano FC) |
| 32 | DF | JPN | Naoki Kawaguchi (on loan from (Japan) Albirex Niigata) |
| 50 | DF | JPN | Tatsuya Yamashita (from (Japan) Cerezo Osaka) |

Out: Note: Flags indicate national team as defined under FIFA eligibility rules; some limited exceptions apply. Players may hold more than one non-FIFA nationality.

| No. | Pos. | Nation | Player |
|---|---|---|---|
| 6 | DF | JPN | Toshiya Takagi (on loan to (Japan) Matsumoto Yamaga) |
| 8 | MF | JPN | Kei Koizumi (on loan to (Japan) Kashima Antlers) |
| 13 | DF | JPN | Ryuta Koike (to (Belgium) Sporting Lokeren) |
| 21 | GK | JPN | Haruki Saruta (on loan to (Japan) Kagoshima United FC) |
| 22 | DF | KOR | Park Jeong-su (on loan to (Japan) Sagan Tosu) |
| 29 | DF | JPN | So Nakagawa (on loan to (Japan) SC Sagamihara) |
| 30 | MF | JPN | Kazuya Murata (on loan to (Japan) Avispa Fukuoka) |

=== V-Varen Nagasaki ===
In: Note: Flags indicate national team as defined under FIFA eligibility rules; some limited exceptions apply. Players may hold more than one non-FIFA nationality.

| No. | Pos. | Nation | Player |
|---|---|---|---|
| 32 | FW | COL | Victor Ibarbo (on loan from (Japan) Sagan Tosu) |
| 37 | MF | JPN | Hiroki Akino (on loan from (Japan) Shonan Bellmare) |
| 40 | MF | BRA | Caio César (on loan from (Japan) Kawasaki Frontale) |

Out: Note: Flags indicate national team as defined under FIFA eligibility rules; some limited exceptions apply. Players may hold more than one non-FIFA nationality.

| No. | Pos. | Nation | Player |
|---|---|---|---|
| 3 | MF | KOR | Choi Kyu-baek (on loan to (South Korea) Jeju United FC) |

=== Yokohama FC ===
In: Note: Flags indicate national team as defined under FIFA eligibility rules; some limited exceptions apply. Players may hold more than one non-FIFA nationality.

| No. | Pos. | Nation | Player |
|---|---|---|---|
| 16 | FW | JPN | Yusuke Minagawa (from (Japan) Sanfrecce Hiroshima) |
| 30 | FW | JPN | Ayumu Tachibana (from (Brazil) Tombense FC, back from loan) |
| 37 | MF | JPN | Yusuke Matsuo (from Sendai University) |
| 46 | MF | JPN | Shunsuke Nakamura (from (Japan) Jubilo Iwata) |
| — | MF | JPN | Tatsuki Seko (from Meiji University) |

Out: Note: Flags indicate national team as defined under FIFA eligibility rules; some limited exceptions apply. Players may hold more than one non-FIFA nationality.

| No. | Pos. | Nation | Player |
|---|---|---|---|
| 6 | MF | JPN | Takahiro Nakazato (to (South Korea) Kataller Toyama) |
| 19 | DF | JPN | Daichi Inui (on loan to (Japan) Tochigi SC) |
| 28 | MF | JPN | Reo Yasunaga (on loan to (Japan) Kataller Toyama) |

=== Machida Zelvia ===
In: Note: Flags indicate national team as defined under FIFA eligibility rules; some limited exceptions apply. Players may hold more than one non-FIFA nationality.

| No. | Pos. | Nation | Player |
|---|---|---|---|
| 10 | MF | JPN | Taiki Hirato (from (Japan) Kashima Antlers) |
| 22 | FW | JPN | Ryohei Hayashi (on loan from (Japan) Tokyo Verdy) |
| 28 | FW | JPN | Ryujoseph Hashimura (from (Brazil) PSTC, end of loan) |
| 40 | DF | JPN | Yuki Kobayashi (on loan from (Japan) Vissel Kobe) |

Out: Note: Flags indicate national team as defined under FIFA eligibility rules; some limited exceptions apply. Players may hold more than one non-FIFA nationality.

| No. | Pos. | Nation | Player |
|---|---|---|---|
| 4 | DF | JPN | Masayuki Yamada (to (Japan) FC Tokyo, end of loan) |

=== Omiya Ardija ===
In: Note: Flags indicate national team as defined under FIFA eligibility rules; some limited exceptions apply. Players may hold more than one non-FIFA nationality.

| No. | Pos. | Nation | Player |
|---|---|---|---|
| 18 | MF | RUS | Ippei Shinozuka (from (Japan) Yokohama F. Marinos) |
| 45 | DF | JPN | Kazuki Kushibiki (on loan from (Japan) Nagoya Grampus) |
| 49 | DF | JPN | Keisuke Nishimura (from Senshu University) |

Out: Note: Flags indicate national team as defined under FIFA eligibility rules; some limited exceptions apply. Players may hold more than one non-FIFA nationality.

| No. | Pos. | Nation | Player |
|---|---|---|---|
| 39 | MF | JPN | Shintaro Shimada (on loan to (Japan) Oita Trinita) |

=== Tokyo Verdy ===
In: Note: Flags indicate national team as defined under FIFA eligibility rules; some limited exceptions apply. Players may hold more than one non-FIFA nationality.

| No. | Pos. | Nation | Player |
|---|---|---|---|
| 11 | FW | BRA | Jailton Paraiba (from (Turkey) Genclerbirligi SK) |
| 13 | MF | JPN | Mizuki Arai (on loan from (Japan) Kataller Toyama) |
| 14 | MF | JPN | Naoto Sawai (from (France) AC Ajaccio, end of loan) |
| 31 | DF | BRA | Klebinho (on loan from (Brazil) CR Flamengo) |
| 50 | FW | KOR | Kang Soo-il (from (Thailand) Ratchaburi) |

Out: Note: Flags indicate national team as defined under FIFA eligibility rules; some limited exceptions apply. Players may hold more than one non-FIFA nationality.

| No. | Pos. | Nation | Player |
|---|---|---|---|
| 7 | MF | JPN | Kota Watanabe (to (Japan) Yokohama F. Marinos) |
| 11 | FW | JPN | Ryohei Hayashi (on loan to (Japan) Machida Zelvia) |
| 27 | FW | SRB | Nemanja Kojić (released) |

=== Avispa Fukuoka ===
In: Note: Flags indicate national team as defined under FIFA eligibility rules; some limited exceptions apply. Players may hold more than one non-FIFA nationality.

| No. | Pos. | Nation | Player |
|---|---|---|---|
| 4 | DF | JPN | Masayuki Yamada (on loan from (Japan) FC Tokyo) |
| 21 | MF | JPN | Kazuya Murata (on loan from (Japan) Kashiwa Reysol) |
| 28 | MF | JPN | Masaru Kato (on loan from (Japan) Albirex Niigata) |
| 35 | DF | JPN | Ryo Hatsuse (on loan from (Japan) Vissel Kobe) |

Out: Note: Flags indicate national team as defined under FIFA eligibility rules; some limited exceptions apply. Players may hold more than one non-FIFA nationality.

| No. | Pos. | Nation | Player |
|---|---|---|---|
| 29 | DF | JPN | Kazunori Yoshimoto (to (Japan) FC Tokyo, end of loan) |

=== Renofa Yamaguchi ===
In: Note: Flags indicate national team as defined under FIFA eligibility rules; some limited exceptions apply. Players may hold more than one non-FIFA nationality.

| No. | Pos. | Nation | Player |
|---|---|---|---|
| 16 | MF | JPN | Takahiro Ko (on loan from (Japan) Gamba Osaka) |
| 28 | DF | JPN | Ryoma Ishida (on loan from (Japan) Jubilo Iwata) |
| 38 | FW | JPN | Taisei Miyashiro (on loan from (Japan) Kawasaki Frontale) |
| 43 | DF | JPN | Hikaru Manabe (from Toin Yokohama University) |

Out: Note: Flags indicate national team as defined under FIFA eligibility rules; some limited exceptions apply. Players may hold more than one non-FIFA nationality.

| No. | Pos. | Nation | Player |
|---|---|---|---|
| 11 | MF | JPN | Yuya Torikai (to (Japan) FC Ryukyu) |
| 16 | DF | JPN | Kazuki Segawa (to (Japan) Tochigi SC) |
| 18 | FW | JPN | Daisuke Takagi (to (Japan) Gamba Osaka) |
| 21 | DF | JPN | Takahiro Tanaka (on loan to (Japan) Suzuka Unlimited FC) |
| 28 | DF | BRA | Marcílio (released) |

=== Ventforet Kofu ===
In: Note: Flags indicate national team as defined under FIFA eligibility rules; some limited exceptions apply. Players may hold more than one non-FIFA nationality.

| No. | Pos. | Nation | Player |
|---|---|---|---|
| 29 | FW | BRA | Allano (on loan from (Portugal) Estoril) |
| 33 | GK | JPN | Yuto Koizumi (on loan from (Japan) Thespakusatsu Gunma) |

Out: Note: Flags indicate national team as defined under FIFA eligibility rules; some limited exceptions apply. Players may hold more than one non-FIFA nationality.

| No. | Pos. | Nation | Player |
|---|---|---|---|
| 20 | MF | JPN | Kyosuke Goto (on loan to (Japan) Thespakusatsu Gunma) |
| 29 | FW | BRA | Junior Barros (on loan to (Japan) FC Gifu) |

=== Mito HollyHock ===
In: Note: Flags indicate national team as defined under FIFA eligibility rules; some limited exceptions apply. Players may hold more than one non-FIFA nationality.

| No. | Pos. | Nation | Player |
|---|---|---|---|
| 17 | MF | JPN | Takaki Fukumitsu (on loan from (Japan) Cerezo Osaka) |
| 19 | FW | JPN | Koki Ogawa (on loan from (Japan) Jubilo Iwata) |
| 30 | MF | BRA | Lelêu (on loan from (Japan) Shonan Bellmare) |
| 38 | DF | JPN | Daiki Miya (on loan from (Japan) Vissel Kobe) |
| 45 | MF | JPN | Yuya Asano (on loan from (Japan) Sanfrecce Hiroshima) |

Out: Note: Flags indicate national team as defined under FIFA eligibility rules; some limited exceptions apply. Players may hold more than one non-FIFA nationality.

| No. | Pos. | Nation | Player |
|---|---|---|---|
| 5 | DF | JPN | Makito Ito (to (Japan) Yokohama F. Marinos) |
| 16 | MF | JPN | Yosuke Nakagawa (on loan to Albirex Niigata Singapore) |
| 29 | FW | JPN | Keita Saito (on loan to (Japan) Nagano Parceiro) |
| 45 | MF | JPN | Yuya Asano (to (Japan) Sanfrecce Hiroshima) |

=== Tokushima Vortis ===
In: Note: Flags indicate national team as defined under FIFA eligibility rules; some limited exceptions apply. Players may hold more than one non-FIFA nationality.

| No. | Pos. | Nation | Player |
|---|---|---|---|
| 15 | FW | JPN | Takeru Kishimoto (from (Japan) Cerezo Osaka, previously on loan) |
| 44 | MF | JPN | Yatsunori Shimaya (on loan from (Japan) Sagan Tosu) |

Out: Note: Flags indicate national team as defined under FIFA eligibility rules; some limited exceptions apply. Players may hold more than one non-FIFA nationality.

| No. | Pos. | Nation | Player |
|---|---|---|---|
| 29 | MF | THA | Chakkit Laptrakul (to (Thailand) BG Pathum United, end of loan) |
| 33 | MF | JPN | Shiryu Fujiwara (on loan to (Portugal) Portimonense SC) |

=== Montedio Yamagata ===
In: Note: Flags indicate national team as defined under FIFA eligibility rules; some limited exceptions apply. Players may hold more than one non-FIFA nationality.

| No. | Pos. | Nation | Player |
|---|---|---|---|
| 33 | FW | JPN | Junya Takahashi (from Komazawa University) |
| 35 | DF | JPN | Hiroki Noda (on loan from (Japan) Gamba Osaka) |
| 37 | FW | JPN | Akito Takagi (on loan from (Japan) Gamba Osaka) |
| 39 | MF | JPN | Daichi Akiyama (on loan from (Japan) Cerezo Osaka) |
| 40 | FW | JPN | Yuya Yamagishi (from (Japan) FC Gifu) |
| 41 | MF | JPN | Ryuhei Yamamoto (on loan from (Japan) Matsumoto Yamaga) |

Out: Note: Flags indicate national team as defined under FIFA eligibility rules; some limited exceptions apply. Players may hold more than one non-FIFA nationality.

| No. | Pos. | Nation | Player |
|---|---|---|---|
| 2 | DF | JPN | Yu Tamura (on loan to (Japan) Thespakusatsu Gunma) |
| 11 | FW | JPN | Toyofumi Sakano (to (Japan) Matsumoto Yamaga) |
| 16 | FW | JPN | Shuto Kitagawa (on loan to (Japan) Giravanz Kitakyushu) |
| 26 | FW | JPN | Ayumu Nagato (on loan to (Japan) FC Maruyasu Okazaki) |

=== Zweigen Kanazawa ===
In: Note: Flags indicate national team as defined under FIFA eligibility rules; some limited exceptions apply. Players may hold more than one non-FIFA nationality.

| No. | Pos. | Nation | Player |
|---|---|---|---|
| 30 | FW | JPN | Towa Yamane (on loan from (Japan) Cerezo Osaka) |
| 36 | MF | JPN | Toshiya Motozuka (from Kanazawa Seiryo University) |
| 37 | DF | JPN | Takayuki Takayasu (from Kokoku High School) |

Out: Note: Flags indicate national team as defined under FIFA eligibility rules; some limited exceptions apply. Players may hold more than one non-FIFA nationality.

| No. | Pos. | Nation | Player |
|---|---|---|---|
| 16 | DF | JPN | Shunya Mori (to (Japan) Shonan Bellmare) |

=== JEF United Chiba ===
In: Note: Flags indicate national team as defined under FIFA eligibility rules; some limited exceptions apply. Players may hold more than one non-FIFA nationality.

| No. | Pos. | Nation | Player |
|---|---|---|---|
| 37 | DF | JPN | Takeaki Hommura (from Ryutsu Keizai University) |
| 39 | MF | JPN | Tomoya Miki (from Kanto Gakuin University) |
| 50 | DF | JPN | Koki Yonekura (on loan from (Japan) Gamba Osaka) |

Out: Note: Flags indicate national team as defined under FIFA eligibility rules; some limited exceptions apply. Players may hold more than one non-FIFA nationality.

| No. | Pos. | Nation | Player |
|---|---|---|---|
| 34 | FW | JPN | Daigo Furukawa (on loan to (Japan) Veertien Mie) |
| 36 | MF | JPN | Masaki Yamamoto (on loan to (Japan) Matsumoto Yamaga) |

=== Fagiano Okayama ===
In: Note: Flags indicate national team as defined under FIFA eligibility rules; some limited exceptions apply. Players may hold more than one non-FIFA nationality.

| No. | Pos. | Nation | Player |
|---|---|---|---|
| 15 | FW | JPN | Hiroki Yamamoto (on loan from (Japan) Matsumoto Yamaga) |
| 37 | MF | JPN | Yasufumi Nishimura (on loan from (Japan) Shimizu S-Pulse) |
| 39 | DF | JPN | Kosuke Masutani (on loan from (Japan) FC Ryukyu) |

Out: Note: Flags indicate national team as defined under FIFA eligibility rules; some limited exceptions apply. Players may hold more than one non-FIFA nationality.

| No. | Pos. | Nation | Player |
|---|---|---|---|
| 31 | DF | JPN | Wakaba Shimoguchi (on loan to (Japan) Nagano Parceiro) |

=== Albirex Niigata ===
In: Note: Flags indicate national team as defined under FIFA eligibility rules; some limited exceptions apply. Players may hold more than one non-FIFA nationality.

| No. | Pos. | Nation | Player |
|---|---|---|---|
| 5 | DF | JPN | Michael Fitzgerald (from (Japan) Kawasaki Frontale) |

Out: Note: Flags indicate national team as defined under FIFA eligibility rules; some limited exceptions apply. Players may hold more than one non-FIFA nationality.

| No. | Pos. | Nation | Player |
|---|---|---|---|
| 10 | MF | JPN | Masaru Kato (on loan to (Japan) Avispa Fukuoka) |
| 24 | DF | JPN | Naoki Kawaguchi (on loan to (Japan) Kashiwa Reysol) |
| 37 | FW | JPN | Shu Hiramatsu (on loan to (Japan) Kataller Toyama) |

=== Tochigi SC ===
In: Note: Flags indicate national team as defined under FIFA eligibility rules; some limited exceptions apply. Players may hold more than one non-FIFA nationality.

| No. | Pos. | Nation | Player |
|---|---|---|---|
| 25 | MF | BRA | Yuri (on loan from (Brazil) EC Bahia) |
| 31 | MF | JPN | Kaito Miyake (from (Germany) Fortuna Düsseldorf II) |
| 35 | GK | JPN | Suguru Asanuma (on loan from (Japan) SC Sagamihara) |
| 36 | DF | JPN | Daichi Inui (on loan from (Japan) Yokohama FC) |
| 45 | DF | JPN | Kazuki Segawa (from (Japan) Renofa Yamaguchi) |
| 47 | FW | KOR | Kim Hyun (on loan from (South Korea) Jeju United FC) |

Out: Note: Flags indicate national team as defined under FIFA eligibility rules; some limited exceptions apply. Players may hold more than one non-FIFA nationality.

| No. | Pos. | Nation | Player |
|---|---|---|---|
| 1 | GK | JPN | Kei Ishikawa (to (Japan) Sagan Tosu) |
| 3 | DF | BRA | Jonas (released) |
| 13 | GK | BRA | Marcos (released) |

=== Ehime FC ===
In: Note: Flags indicate national team as defined under FIFA eligibility rules; some limited exceptions apply. Players may hold more than one non-FIFA nationality.

| No. | Pos. | Nation | Player |
|---|---|---|---|
| 24 | DF | JPN | Rikiya Motegi (on loan from (Japan) Urawa Red Diamonds) |
| 36 | MF | JPN | Kyoji Kotsuna (from Biwako Seikei Sport College) |

Out: Note: Flags indicate national team as defined under FIFA eligibility rules; some limited exceptions apply. Players may hold more than one non-FIFA nationality.

| No. | Pos. | Nation | Player |
|---|---|---|---|
| 21 | GK | JPN | Hiroki Mawatari (on loan to (Japan) Kawasaki Frontale) |

=== Kyoto Sanga ===
In: Note: Flags indicate national team as defined under FIFA eligibility rules; some limited exceptions apply. Players may hold more than one non-FIFA nationality.

| No. | Pos. | Nation | Player |
|---|---|---|---|
| 37 | MF | JPN | Teppei Yachida (from Teikyo Nagaoka High School) |
| 44 | MF | JPN | Yuya Nakasaka (on loan from (Japan) Vissel Kobe) |
| 50 | MF | JPN | Jungo Fujimoto (on loan from (Japan) Gamba Osaka) |

Out: Note: Flags indicate national team as defined under FIFA eligibility rules; some limited exceptions apply. Players may hold more than one non-FIFA nationality.

| No. | Pos. | Nation | Player |
|---|---|---|---|
| 2 | DF | JPN | Go Iwase (on loan to (Japan) Thespakusatsu Gunma) |
| — | DF | CHN | Wu Shao Cong (to (China) Guangzhou Evergrande, end of loan) |

=== FC Gifu ===
In: Note: Flags indicate national team as defined under FIFA eligibility rules; some limited exceptions apply. Players may hold more than one non-FIFA nationality.

| No. | Pos. | Nation | Player |
|---|---|---|---|
| 29 | FW | BRA | Junior Barros (on loan from (Japan) Ventforet Kofu) |
| 38 | MF | JPN | Koki Tsukagawa (on loan from (Japan) Matsumoto Yamaga) |
| 39 | FW | JPN | Kenji Baba (on loan from (Japan) Oita Trinita) |
| 40 | DF | JPN | Tomonobu Yokoyama (free agent) |
| 50 | DF | JPN | Takefumi Toma (on loan from (Japan) Matsumoto Yamaga) |

Out: Note: Flags indicate national team as defined under FIFA eligibility rules; some limited exceptions apply. Players may hold more than one non-FIFA nationality.

| No. | Pos. | Nation | Player |
|---|---|---|---|
| 9 | FW | JPN | Yuya Yamagishi (to (Japan) Montedio Yamagata) |
| 14 | MF | JPN | Koya Kazama (on loan to (Japan) FC Ryukyu) |
| 18 | FW | JPN | Daichi Ishikawa (on loan to (Japan) Azul Claro Numazu) |

=== FC Ryukyu ===
In: Note: Flags indicate national team as defined under FIFA eligibility rules; some limited exceptions apply. Players may hold more than one non-FIFA nationality.

| No. | Pos. | Nation | Player |
|---|---|---|---|
| 2 | DF | POR | Daniel Sanches (from (Spain) Real Betis B) |
| 7 | MF | JPN | Shinji Ono (from (Japan) Hokkaido Consadole Sapporo) |
| 9 | FW | JPN | Hiroto Yamada (on loan from (Japan) Cerezo Osaka) |
| 34 | MF | BRA | Ramon (on loan from (Brazil) Fluminense FC) |
| 36 | MF | JPN | Koya Kazama (on loan from (Japan) FC Gifu) |
| 37 | MF | JPN | Yuya Torikai (from (Japan) Renofa Yamaguchi) |

Out: Note: Flags indicate national team as defined under FIFA eligibility rules; some limited exceptions apply. Players may hold more than one non-FIFA nationality.

| No. | Pos. | Nation | Player |
|---|---|---|---|
| 2 | DF | JPN | Kosuke Masutani (on loan to (Japan) Fagiano Okayama) |
| 9 | FW | JPN | Koji Suzuki (to (Japan) Cerezo Osaka) |
| 15 | FW | JPN | Ryo Wada (to (Japan) Kagoshima United FC) |
| 34 | FW | JPN | Kojiro Kokuba (to (Japan) Okinawa International University) |

=== Kagoshima United FC ===
In: Note: Flags indicate national team as defined under FIFA eligibility rules; some limited exceptions apply. Players may hold more than one non-FIFA nationality.

| No. | Pos. | Nation | Player |
|---|---|---|---|
| 2 | DF | KOR | Yeon Jei-min (from (South Korea) Busan IPark) |
| 4 | MF | JPN | Rei Hirakawa (on loan from (Japan) FC Tokyo) |
| 29 | GK | JPN | Haruki Saruta (on loan from (Japan) Kashiwa Reysol) |
| 44 | FW | JPN | Ryo Wada (from (Japan) FC Ryukyu) |
| 49 | FW | BRA | Lucão (from (Greece) Apollon Larissa) |

Out: Note: Flags indicate national team as defined under FIFA eligibility rules; some limited exceptions apply. Players may hold more than one non-FIFA nationality.

| No. | Pos. | Nation | Player |
|---|---|---|---|
| 4 | DF | BRA | Willian Magrão (released) |
| 25 | MF | JPN | Masaki Sakamoto (on loan to (Japan) FC Maruyasu Okazaki) |
