= Mitsubishi Yowa =

Japanese football club

- Full name: Mitsubishi Yowa Soccer Club
- Founded: 1914; 112 years ago
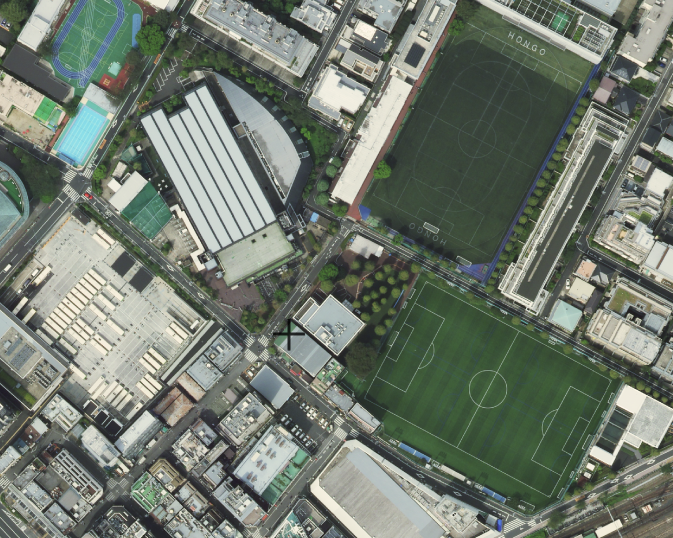
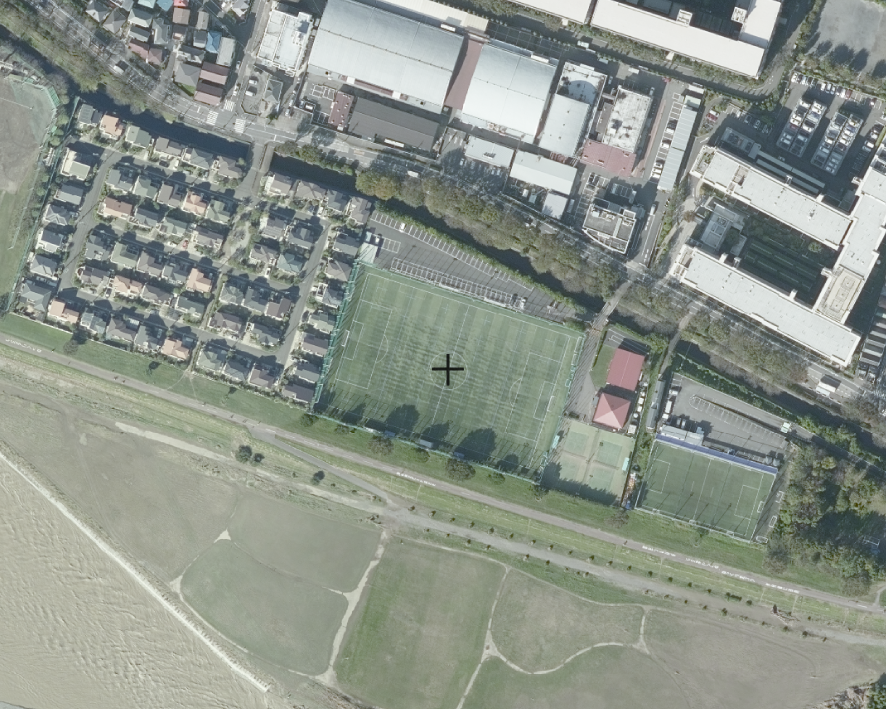
- Ground: Sugamo Sports Center Chofu Ground
- League: U18 Prince League - 2025
Home colours	Away colours

Mitsubishi Yowa Kai (三菱養和会, Mitsubishi Yōwa Kai) commonly referred to as simply Mitsubishi Yowa or Yowa-kai is a Japanese multisports club based in Sugamo, Tokyo. The club is best known for its football section, also known as Mitsubishi Yowa S.C which has a distinguished record in youth player development. In recent years, Mitsubishi Yowa S.C has continued to contribute to the Samurai Blue, with players such as Yuki Soma, Keito Nakamura and Henry Hiroki Mochizuki all earning international caps under Hajime Moriyasu.

In the past, their graduates such as Kokichi Kimura, Yuichiro Nagai, Yoshizumi Ogawa and Junya Tanaka have represented the national team, establishing Mitsubishi Yowa as a leading pleyer development club in Japan.

== History ==
The Mitsubishi Yowa Club was originally founded in 1914 as the Mitsubishi Club by Mitsubishi Goshi Kaisha. Over the years, it evolved through various restructurings and name changes. In 1940, it became the Mitsubishi Yowa Association, separating from the company. The organization opened its membership beyond Mitsubishi employees in 1946.

Further developments included the establishment of the Mitsubishi Yowa Club in 1956, followed by the Mitsubishi Sports Club in 1975. Finally, in 1981, these three entities—Mitsubishi Yowa Association, Mitsubishi Yowa Club, and Mitsubishi Sports Club—merged to form the present-day Mitsubishi Yowa Club.

== Sports facilities ==
The sports facilities at Mitsubishi include two main locations in Tokyo:

- Sugamo Sports Center (Toshima Ward) – A multi-purpose facility with a gymnasium, swimming pool, martial arts hall, golf practice area, fitness gym, and artificial turf (3G) field for football, rugby, and other sports.
- Chofu Ground (Chofu City) – Features a 3G pitch and two sand-filled artificial grass tennis courts.

These facilities support a variety of sports, including football, tennis, gymnastics, swimming, rugby, judo, kendo, and golf.

== Honours ==
- Japan Club Youth Football Cup
  - Winners: 1980, 1983, 2014
- U-15 Prince Takamado Cup
  - Winners: 1994, 1997

== Notable graduates from the football section ==
=== 1960s births ===
Player Name	Joining Club
Kokichi Kimura	Nissan Motor Soccer Club
Yoichi Hayashi	Nippon Kokan Soccer Club
Yoshinori Kumada	All Nippon Airways Yokohama Soccer Club
Yoshiaki Okamoto	Nissan Motor Soccer Club
Morihiko Yamamichi	Mitsubishi Heavy Industries Soccer Club
Yoshihiro Takagi	Cosmo Oil Yokkaichi FC
Akihisa Sonobe	Mitsubishi Heavy Industries Soccer Club
Ryu Takakatsu	Kyoto Shiko Soccer Club
Osamu Hirose	Mitsubishi Heavy Industries Soccer Club
Motohiro Shirane	Mitsubishi Heavy Industries Soccer Club
Satoru Watanabe	Mitsubishi Heavy Industries Soccer Club
Koichi Hashimoto	SC Corinthians Paulista (Brazil)
Masaru Sato	Cosmo Oil Yokkaichi FC
Naofumi Koike	Yokohama Marinos
Toru Yoneda	Kofu Club

=== 1970s births ===
Player Name	Joining Club
Eiji Sato	Urawa Red Diamonds
Toru Koyano	FC KYOKEN Kyoto
Yukio Tsuchiya	EC Noroeste (Brazil)
Kenji Kikawada	Consadole Sapporo
Kensuke Kagami	Tokyo Gas FC
Kazuyoshi Mikami	Vissel Kobe
Yosuke Minami	Tessensohn Khalsa Rovers (Singapore)
Jun-nosuke Schneider	Gunma FC Fortuna
Takuro Nishimura	Urawa Red Diamonds
Yu Hoshide	YKK AP Football Club
Michiyasu Nagata	Verdy Kawasaki
Yuichiro Nagai	Urawa Red Diamonds
Yuichi Kodama	Ehime FC
Jun Ideguchi	Yokohama F. Marinos
Jun Uruno	Honda FC
Kunio Otsuki	Yokogawa Musashino FC
Takanori Kamizawa	Nagoya Oceans
Takuya Mikami	Urawa Red Diamonds

=== 1980s births ===
Player Name	Joining Club
Rinichi Mikami	Parramatta FC (Australia)
Takumi Motohashi	Yokohama F. Marinos
Atsushi Koji	Royal Thai Army FC (Thailand)
Yuta Baba	FC Tokyo
Takahiro Yamaguchi	Shonan Bellmare
Yoshizumi Ogawa	Nagoya Grampus
Ryota Aoki	Gamba Osaka
Tomoya Osawa	Omiya Ardija
Kohei Tokita	Omiya Ardija
Hiroto Kirowlan	Tokyo Verdy
Junya Tanaka	Kashiwa Reysol
Shuji Fujimoto	JEF United Chiba
Takato Ohtake	FC Machida Zelvia
Sho Kamimura	Mito Hollyhock
Keita Tanaka	AC Nagano Parceiro
Fumiya Kigure	Albirex Niigata

=== 1990s births ===
Player Name	Joining Club
Kohei Matsumoto	HOYO Oita
Yuto Nakamura	Vanraure Hachinohe
Dai Kato	Albirex Niigata
Yusuke Harada	SC Brühl 06/45 (Germany)
Shungo Tamashiro	Zweigen Kanazawa
Teruki Tanaka	Nagoya Grampus
Koki Takenaka	Tokyo Verdy
Takashi Kondo	Ehime FC
Kyosuke Goto	FK Mogren (Montenegro)
Ryota Tanabe	Nagoya Grampus
Kengo Nagai	Matsumoto Yamaga FC
Ryo-ya Iizumi	FC Imabari
Julaito Ikeda	Cerezo Osaka
Akira Silvano Disaro	Giravanz Kitakyushu
Yuki Soma	Nagoya Grampus
Itsuki Seko	Yokohama FC
Rintaro Tajima	VVV-Venlo (Netherlands)
Koji Sugiyama	Fagiano Okayama
Koh Miyazaki	Tochigi SC
Shintaro Kato	Blaublitz Akita
Koki Kawashima	SC Sagamihara

=== 2000s births ===
Player Name	Joining Club
Hikaru Endo	Ventforet Kofu
Keito Nakamura	Gamba Osaka
Shinta Appelkamp	Fortuna Düsseldorf (Germany)
Ibrahim Junior Kuribara	Shimizu S-Pulse
Shunsuke Nishikubo	JEF United Chiba
