= Kengo Nagai =

Japanese footballer (born 1994)

Kengo Nagai 永井 堅梧
Personal information
- Full name: Kengo Nagai
- Date of birth: 6 November 1994 (age 32)
- Place of birth: Saitama, Japan
- Height: 1.84 m (6 ft 0 in)
- Position: Goalkeeper

Team information
- Current team: Kashiwa Reysol
- Number: 29

Youth career
- Niizaka Tayama FC SSS
- –2012: Mitsubishi Yowa

Senior career*
Years	Team	Apps	(Gls)
2013–2020	Matsumoto Yamaga	0	(0)
2014	→ J.League U-22 Selection (loan)	8	(0)
2015–2018	→ Kataller Toyama (loan)	91	(0)
2019	→ Tokushima Vortis (loan)	1	(0)
2020	→ Giravanz Kitakyushu (loan)	40	(0)
2021–2024	Shimizu S-Pulse	8	(0)
2023–2024	Yokohama FC (loan)	18	(0)
2025	Tokushima Vortis	0	(0)
2025–	Kashiwa Reysol	3	(0)
- * Club domestic league appearances and goals as of 10 August 2026

Kengo Nagai (永井 堅梧, Nagai Kengo; born 6 November 1994 in Saitama) is a Japanese footballer who plays for Kashiwa Reysol.

== Club statistics ==
Updated to 24 July 2022.

Club performance			League		Cup		League Cup		Total	
Season	Club	League	Apps	Goals	Apps	Goals	Apps	Goals	Apps	Goals
Japan			League		Emperor's Cup		J.League Cup		Total	
2013	Matsumoto Yamaga	J2 League	0	0	0	0	–		0	0
2014	Matsumoto Yamaga	J2 League	0	0	0	0	–		0	0
2015	Kataller Toyama	J3 League	4	0	–		–		4	0
2016	Kataller Toyama	J3 League	23	0	2	0	–		25	0
2017	Kataller Toyama	J3 League	32	0	2	0	–		34	0
2018	Kataller Toyama	J3 League	32	0	1	0	–		33	0
2019	Tokushima Vortis	J2 League	1	0	0	0	–		1	0
2020	Giravanz Kitakyushu	J2 League	40	0	0	0	–		40	0
2021	Shimizu S-Pulse	J1 League	0	0	3	0	8	0	11	0
2022	Shimizu S-Pulse	J1 League	0	0	1	0	0	0	1	0
Career total			132	0	9	0	8	0	149	0
