= Junto Taguchi =

Japanese footballer

Junto Taguchi 田口 潤人
Personal information
- Full name: Junto Taguchi
- Date of birth: September 28, 1996 (age 30)
- Place of birth: Aichi, Japan
- Height: 1.81 m (5 ft 11 1/2 in)
- Position: Goalkeeper

Team information
- Current team: Fujieda MYFC
- Number: 1

Youth career
- Yokohama Junior SC
- –2014: Yokohama F. Marinos

Senior career*
Years	Team	Apps	(Gls)
2015–2017	Yokohama F. Marinos	0	(0)
2017	→ Fujieda MYFC (loan)	21	(0)
2018–2019	Albirex Niigata	2	(0)
2020–2024	FC Ryukyu	88	(0)
2024-2025	Renofa Yamaguchi	8	(0)
2026-	Fujieda MYFC	0	(0)
Medal record
Representing Japan
AFC U-16 Championship
Silver medal – second place	2012 Iran
- * Club domestic league appearances and goals as of 13 August 2026

Junto Taguchi (田口 潤人, Taguchi Junto; born September 28, 1996) is a Japanese football player for Fujieda MYFC.

== Career ==
After being raised by Yokohama F. Marinos youth ranks and entering first squad, he found his first pro-cap in a J3 League match: he was loaned to Fujieda MYFC for 2017 season and debuted on March 18, 2017 against FC Tokyo U-23.

== Career statistics ==
Updated to 23 February 2018.

Appearances and goals by club, season and competition
Club	Season	League			Emperor's Cup		J.League Cup		Total	
Club	Season	Division	Apps	Goals	Apps	Goals	Apps	Goals	Apps	Goals
Yokohama F. Marinos	2015	J1 League	0	0	0	0	0	0	0	0
Yokohama F. Marinos	2016	J1 League	0	0	0	0	0	0	0	0
Fujieda MYFC	2017	J3 League	21	0	—		—		21	0
Career total			21	0	0	0	0	0	21	0
