= Ryo Ishii (footballer, born 1993) =

Japanese footballer

Ryo Ishii 石井 綾
Personal information
- Full name: Ryo Ishii
- Date of birth: June 24, 1993 (age 33)
- Place of birth: Okazaki, Aichi, Japan
- Height: 1.83 m (6 ft 0 in)
- Position: Goalkeeper

Team information
- Current team: Zweigen Kanazawa
- Number: 21

Youth career
- 2009–2011: Nagoya Grampus Youth
- 2012–2015: Chukyo University

Senior career*
Years	Team	Apps	(Gls)
2016–2019	Mito HollyHock	0	(0)
2017	→ Azul Claro Numazu (loan)	13	(0)
2018	→ Fukushima United (loan)	6	(0)
2019	→ FC Ryukyu (loan)	12	(0)
2020–2021	→ Zweigen Kanazawa (loan)	6	(0)
2022	→ Suzuka Point Getters (loan)	1	(0)
- * Club domestic league appearances and goals as of 22:07, 30 June 2022 (UTC)

Ryo Ishii (石井 綾, Ishii Ryo; born June 24, 1993) is a Japanese football player. He is a registered player for Zweigen Kanazawa, but currently on loan to Suzuka Point Getters.

== Career ==
Ryo Ishii joined J2 League club Mito HollyHock in 2016. He moved on loan to J3 League club Azul Claro Numazu in 2017. After coming back to Mito, he opted for another loan in J3, this time to Fukushima United FC.

== Club statistics ==
Updated to 30 June 2022.

Club performance			League		Cup		Total	
Season	Club	League	Apps	Goals	Apps	Goals	Apps	Goals
Japan			League		Emperor's Cup		Total	
2016	Mito HollyHock	J2 League	0	0	0	0	0	0
2017	Azul Claro Numazu	J3 League	13	0	2	0	15	0
2018	Fukushima United FC	J3 League	6	0	-		6	0
2019	FC Ryukyu	J2 League	12	0	1	0	13	0
2020	Zweigen Kanazawa	J2 League	6	0	0	0	6	0
2021	Zweigen Kanazawa	J2 League	0	0	0	0	0	0
2022	Suzuka Point Getters	JFL	1	0	0	0	1	0
Total			32	0	3	0	35	0
