= Masaya Yoshida =

Japanese footballer

Personal information
- Date of birth: 10 October 1996 (age 30)
- Place of birth: Saitama, Japan
- Height: 1.78 m (5 ft 10 in)
- Position: Defender

Team information
- Current team: ReinMeer Aomori
- Number: 6

Youth career
- Azuma FC
- Seiritsu Zebra FC
- 2012–2014: Seiritsu Gakuen High School

College career
Years	Team	Apps	(Gls)
2015–2018	Tokyo University of Agriculture		

Senior career*
Years	Team	Apps	(Gls)
2019	Thespakusatsu Gunma	25	(2)
2020–2023	Matsumoto Yamaga	8	(0)
2021	→ Tochigi SC (loan)	12	(0)
2023–	ReinMeer Aomori	0	(0)
- * Club domestic league appearances and goals as of 22:02, 28 August 2023 (UTC)

Masaya Yoshida (吉田 将也, Yoshida Masaya; born 10 October 1996) is a Japanese footballer currently playing as a defender for ReinMeer Aomori.

== Career statistics ==
=== Club ===
As of 28 March 2021.

Club	Season	League			National Cup		League Cup		Other		Total	
Club	Season	Division	Apps	Goals	Apps	Goals	Apps	Goals	Apps	Goals	Apps	Goals
Thespakusatsu Gunma	2019	J3 League	25	2	2 (Note: Appearances in the Emperor's Cup)	0	–		0	0	25	2
Matsumoto Yamaga	2020	J2 League	6	0	0	0	0	0	0	0	6	0
Matsumoto Yamaga	2021	J2 League	0	0	0	0	0	0	0	0	0	0
Matsumoto Yamaga	Total		25	2	2	0	0	0	0	0	25	2
Tochigi SC (loan)	2021	J2 League	2	0	0	0	0	0	0	0	2	0
Career total			33	2	2	0	0	0	0	0	35	2
