= Yoshiki Oka =

Japanese footballer

Yoshiki Oka 岡 佳樹
Personal information
- Full name: Yoshiki Oka
- Date of birth: April 26, 1994 (age 32)
- Place of birth: Osaka, Japan
- Height: 1.85 m (6 ft 1 in)
- Position: Forward

Team information
- Current team: Vanraure Hachinohe

Youth career
- 2013–2016: Momoyama Gakuin University

Senior career*
Years	Team	Apps	(Gls)
2017–2019	Matsumoto Yamaga	4	(0)
2018–2019	→ Azul Claro Numazu (loan)	34	(5)
2020	Nagano Parceiro	21	(1)
2021–	Vanraure Hachinohe	0	(0)
- * Club domestic league appearances and goals as of 14:49, 16 January 2021 (UTC)

Yoshiki Oka (岡 佳樹, Oka Yoshiki; born April 26, 1994) is a Japanese football player. He plays for Vanraure Hachinohe.

== Career ==
Yoshiki Oka joined J2 League club Matsumoto Yamaga FC in 2017.

== Club statistics ==
Updated to 22 February 2020.

Club performance			League		Cup		Total	
Season	Club	League	Apps	Goals	Apps	Goals	Apps	Goals
Japan			League		Emperor's Cup		Total	
2017	Matsumoto Yamaga	J2 League	4	0	3	0	7	0
2018	Azul Claro Numazu	J3 League	10	1	–		10	1
2019	Azul Claro Numazu	J3 League	24	4	–		24	4
Total			38	5	3	0	41	5
