= Masaaki Murakami =

Japanese footballer (born 1992)

Masaaki Murakami 村上昌謙
Personal information
- Full name: Masaaki Murakami
- Date of birth: 7 August 1992 (age 34)
- Place of birth: Shiga, Japan
- Height: 1.85 m (6 ft 1 in)
- Position: Goalkeeper

Team information
- Current team: Kyoto Sanga
- Number: 94

Youth career
- Kawanishi SSS
- 2005–2007: Moriyama Kita Junior High School
- 2008–2010: Kusatsu Higashi High School

College career
Years	Team	Apps	(Gls)
2011–2014	Osaka University H&SS		

Senior career*
Years	Team	Apps	(Gls)
2015–2019	Renofa Yamaguchi	26	(0)
2019	→ Mito HollyHock (loan)	6	(0)
2020–2025	Avispa Fukuoka	138	(0)
2026–	Kyoto Sanga	1	(0)
- * Club domestic league appearances and goals as of 1 August 2026

Masaaki Murakami (村上 昌謙, Murakami Masaaki; born 7 August 1992 in Shiga) is a Japanese footballer who plays as a goalkeeper for J1 League club Kyoto Sanga.

== Club statistics ==
As of 20 April 2026.

Appearances and goals by club, season and competition
Club	Season	League			National cup (Note: Includes Emperors Cup)		League cup (Note: Includes J.League Cup)		Total	
Club	Season	Division	Apps	Goals	Apps	Goals	Apps	Goals	Apps	Goals
Renofa Yamaguchi	2015	J3 League	0	0	0	0	–		0	0
Renofa Yamaguchi	2016	J2 League	12	0	1	0	–		13	0
Renofa Yamaguchi	2017	J2 League	14	0	1	0	–		15	0
Renofa Yamaguchi	2018	J2 League	0	0	0	0	–		0	0
Renofa Yamaguchi	Total		26	0	2	0	0	0	28	0
Mito HollyHock (loan)	2019	J2 League	6	0	2	0	–		8	0
Avispa Fukuoka	2020	J2 League	14	0	0	0	0	0	14	0
Avispa Fukuoka	2021	J1 League	37	0	0	0	0	0	37	0
Avispa Fukuoka	2022	J1 League	27	0	2	0	6	0	35	0
Avispa Fukuoka	2023	J1 League	20	0	1	0	4	0	25	0
Avispa Fukuoka	2024	J1 League	26	0	0	0	1	0	27	0
Avispa Fukuoka	2025	J1 League	14	0	0	0	0	0	14	0
Avispa Fukuoka	Total		138	0	3	0	11	0	152	0
Career total			170	0	7	0	11	0	188	0
