= Yota Shimokawa =

Japanese footballer

Yota Shimokawa 下川 陽太
Personal information
- Full name: Yota Shimokawa
- Date of birth: September 7, 1995 (age 31)
- Place of birth: Osaka, Japan
- Height: 1.78 m (5 ft 10 in)
- Position: Left back

Team information
- Current team: Tegevajaro Miyazaki
- Number: 39

Youth career
- Athpegas Ikoma FC
- Athpegas FC
- 2011–2013: Kunimi High School

College career
Years	Team	Apps	(Gls)
2014–2017	Osaka University of Commerce		

Senior career*
Years	Team	Apps	(Gls)
2017	→ Matsumoto Yamaga (loan)	8	(0)
2018–2023	Matsumoto Yamaga	11	(0)
2019	→ Ehime FC (loan)	37	(3)
2020	→ Zweigen Kanazawa (loan)	26	(1)
2024	Nara Club	33	(1)
2025–	Tegevajaro Miyazaki	57	(1)
- * Club domestic league appearances and goals as of 16 August 2026

Yota Shimokawa (下川 陽太, Shimokawa Yota; born September 7, 1995) is a Japanese football player. He plays for Tegevajaro Miyazaki.

== Career ==
Yota Shimokawa joined J2 League club Matsumoto Yamaga FC in 2017, before signing on loan firstly for Ehime FC and then Zweigen Kanazawa.

== Club statistics ==
Updated to 5 April 2020.

Club performance			League		Cup		Total	
Season	Club	League	Apps	Goals	Apps	Goals	Apps	Goals
Japan			League		Emperor's Cup		Total	
2017	Matsumoto Yamaga	J2 League	8	0	0	0	8	0
2018	Matsumoto Yamaga	J2 League	11	0	2	0	13	0
2019	Ehime FC	J2 League	37	3	0	0	37	3
Total			56	3	2	0	58	3
