= Ono Cholhwan =

South Korean footballer

Ono Cholhwan 大野 哲煥
Personal information
- Full name: Ono Cholhwan
- Date of birth: October 25, 1993 (age 33)
- Place of birth: Shimane, Japan
- Height: 1.86 m (6 ft 1 in)
- Position: Goalkeeper

Team information
- Current team: Kagoshima United
- Number: 31

Youth career
- 2009–2011: Sanfrecce Hiroshima

College career
Years	Team	Apps	(Gls)
2012–2015	Josai International University		

Senior career*
Years	Team	Apps	(Gls)
2016–2020	JEF United Chiba	9	(0)
2020	→ Tochigi SC (loan)	0	(0)
2021–2023	FC Gifu	7	(0)
2024–	Kagoshima United	4	(0)
- * Club domestic league appearances and goals as of 30 October 2024

Ono Cholhwan (大野哲煥, Ono Cholhwan; born October 25, 1993) is a South Korean football player for J2 League club Kagoshima United.

== Career ==
After joining from Josai International University, Ono didn't play a single pro-match for JEF United Chiba, being basically the 3rd choice goalkeeper. This went on until 2018 season, when manager Juan Esnáider gave him space in the 2nd part of the year: Ono debuted against Renofa Yamaguchi, playing several matches in a row.

== Club statistics ==
Updated to 25 October 2018.

Club performance			League		Cup		Total	
Season	Club	League	Apps	Goals	Apps	Goals	Apps	Goals
Japan			League		Emperor's Cup		Total	
2016	JEF United Chiba	J2 League	0	0	0	0	0	0
2017	JEF United Chiba	J2 League	0	0	0	0	0	0
2018	JEF United Chiba	J2 League	8	0	0	0	8	0
Total			8	0	0	0	8	0
