= Akira Ando =

Japanese footballer

Akira Ando 安東 輝
Personal information
- Full name: Akira Ando
- Date of birth: 28 June 1995 (age 31)
- Place of birth: Usuki, Ōita, Japan
- Height: 1.73 m (5 ft 8 in)
- Position: Midfielder

Team information
- Current team: Matsumoto Yamaga

Youth career
- 2008–2013: JFA Fukushima Academy

Senior career*
Years	Team	Apps	(Gls)
2017	Shonan Bellmare	2	(0)
2014–2015	→ Fukushima United (loan)	58	(3)
2016	→ Zweigen Kanazawa (loan)	19	(1)
2017	Shonan Bellmare	2	(0)
2018–	Matsumoto Yamaga	9	(0)
2020	→ Mito HollyHock (loan)	27	(0)
- * Club domestic league appearances and goals as of 18:49, 19 January 2021 (UTC)

Akira Ando (安東 輝, Andō Akira; born 28 June 1995 in Usuki, Ōita) is a Japanese footballer who plays for Mito HollyHock.

== Career statistics ==
Updated to 23 February 2018.

Appearances and goals by club, season and competition
Club	Season	League			Emperor's Cup		J.League Cup		Total	
Club	Season	Division	Apps	Goals	Apps	Goals	Apps	Goals	Apps	Goals
Fukushima United FC	2014	J3 League	31	2	1	0	—		32	2
Fukushima United FC	2015	J3 League	27	1	1	0	—		28	1
Zweigen Kanazawa	2016	J2 League	19	1	2	0	—		21	1
Shonan Bellmare	2017	J2 League	2	0	1	0	—		3	0
Career total			79	4	5	0	—		84	4
