= Daisei Suzuki =

Japanese footballer

Daisei Suzuki 鈴木 大誠
Personal information
- Date of birth: 28 May 1996 (age 30)
- Place of birth: Ikoma, Nara, Japan
- Height: 1.82 m (6 ft 0 in)
- Position: Defender

Team information
- Current team: Nara Club
- Number: 5

Youth career
- –2011: Solestrella Nara 2002
- 2012–2014: Seiryo High School

College career
Years	Team	Apps	(Gls)
2015–2018	University of Tsukuba		

Senior career*
Years	Team	Apps	(Gls)
2019–2022	Tokushima Vortis	8	(0)
2020	→ FC Ryukyu (loan)	21	(0)
2022	→ Ehime FC (loan)	27	(0)
2023–	Nara Club	109	(2)
- * Club domestic league appearances and goals as of 1 January 2026

Daisei Suzuki (鈴木 大誠, Suzuki Daisei; born 28 May 1996) is a Japanese professional footballer who plays as a defender for hometown club, Nara Club.

== Career ==
On 8 December 2022, Suzuki joined J3 League hometown newly promoted, Nara Club for upcoming 2023 season.
