= Shogo Shimohata =

Japanese footballer

Shogo Shimohata 下畠 翔吾
Personal information
- Full name: Shogo Shimohata
- Date of birth: May 8, 1992 (age 34)
- Place of birth: Moriyama, Japan
- Height: 1.78 m (5 ft 10 in)
- Position: Centre back

Team information
- Current team: Iwate Grulla Morioka
- Number: 2

Youth career
- 2008–2010: Kyoto Sanga

Senior career*
Years	Team	Apps	(Gls)
2011–2019	Kyoto Sanga	94	(1)
2012	→ Sagawa Printing (loan)	28	(2)
2020–	Iwate Grulla Morioka	1	(0)
Medal record
Kyoto Sanga FC
Runner-up	Emperor's Cup	2011
- * Club domestic league appearances and goals as of 14 April 2020

Shogo Shimohata (下畠 翔吾, Shimohata Shōgo; born May 8, 1992) is a Japanese football player. He plays for Iwate Grulla Morioka.

== Career ==
Shogo Shimohata joined Kyoto Sanga from the club's youth team in 2011. He made his professional debut in the Emperor's Cup on January 1, 2012, in a final match against FC Tokyo. He moved to the Japan Football League club Sagawa Printing in 2012. In 2013, he returned to Kyoto Sanga.

== Career statistics ==
Updated to 14 April 2020.

Appearances and goals by club, season and competition
Club	Season	League			Emperor's Cup		Total	
Club	Season	Division	Apps	Goals	Apps	Goals	Apps	Goals
Kyoto Sanga	2011	J2 League	0	0	1	0	1	0
Sagawa Printing	2012	JFL	28	2	—		28	2
Kyoto Sanga	2013	J2 League	8	0	0	0	8	0
Kyoto Sanga	2014	J2 League	1	0	0	0	1	0
Kyoto Sanga	2015	J2 League	20	0	2	0	22	0
Kyoto Sanga	2016	J2 League	30	1	1	0	31	1
Kyoto Sanga	2017	J2 League	20	0	1	0	21	0
Kyoto Sanga	2018	J2 League	12	0	1	0	13	0
Kyoto Sanga	2019	J2 League	3	0	1	0	4	0
Career total			122	3	7	0	129	3
