= Rodolfo (footballer, born 1997) =

Brazilian footballer

Personal information
- Full name: Rodolfo Tito de Moraes
- Date of birth: 5 March 1997 (age 29)
- Place of birth: Navidade, Brazil
- Height: 1.79 m (5 ft 10 in)
- Position: Left back

Team information
- Current team: Boavista

Senior career*
Years	Team	Apps	(Gls)
2016–2023	Metropolitano	9	(0)
2017	→ Atlético Itapemirim (loan)	0	(0)
2018	→ Boa Esporte (loan)	0	(0)
2018	→ CEOV Operário (loan)	0	(0)
2019	→ Montedio Yamagata (loan)	10	(0)
2020–2022	→ Zweigen Kanazawa (loan)	35	(3)
2022	→ Inter de Limeira (loan)	17	(0)
2022–2023	→ Ferroviária (loan)	7	(0)
2023	→ Ypiranga (loan)	9	(0)
2024	Figueirense	20	(0)
2025–	Boavista	11	(0)
2026	→ Itabaiana (loan)	14	(0)
- * Club domestic league appearances and goals as of 11 November 2026

Rodolfo Tito de Moraes (born 5 March 1997), commonly known as Rodolfo or Tito, is a Brazilian footballer who currently plays as a defender for Boavista.

== Career statistics ==
=== Club ===
As of 8 April 2019.

Club	Season	League			Cup		Other		Total	
Club	Season	Division	Apps	Goals	Apps	Goals	Apps	Goals	Apps	Goals
Metropolitano	2016	Série D	1	0	0	0	0	0	1	0
Metropolitano	2017	Série D	8	0	0	0	5 (Note: Appearances in the Campeonato Catarinense)	0	13	0
Metropolitano	2018	–			0	0	0	0	0	0
Metropolitano	2019	–			0	0	0	0	0	0
Metropolitano	Total		9	0	0	0	5	0	14	0
Atlético Itapemirim (loan)	2017	–			7 (Note: Appearances in the Copa Espírito Santo)	0	0	0	7	0
Boa Esporte (loan)	2018	Série B	0	0	0	0	3 (Note: Appearances in the Campeonato Mineiro)	0	3	0
Montedio Yamagata (loan)	2019	J2 League	3	0	0	0	0	0	3	0
Career total			12	0	7	0	8	0	27	0
