= Danto Sugiyama =

Japanese footballer

Danto Sugiyama 杉山 弾斗
Personal information
- Full name: Danto Sugiyama
- Date of birth: May 20, 1999 (age 27)
- Place of birth: Tokyo, Japan
- Height: 1.78 m (5 ft 10 in)
- Position: Left back

Team information
- Current team: Kamatamare Sanuki (on loan from JEF United Chiba)
- Number: 22

Youth career
- 2015–2017: Ichiritsu Funabashi High School

Senior career*
Years	Team	Apps	(Gls)
2018–	JEF United Chiba	3	(0)
2019	→ Kataller Toyama (loan)	0	(0)
2020–	→ Kamatamare Sanuki (loan)	9	(0)
- * Club domestic league appearances and goals as of 20:27, 20 January 2021 (UTC)

Danto Sugiyama (杉山 弾斗, Sugiyama Danto; born May 20, 1999) is a Japanese football player for Kamatamare Sanuki on loan from JEF United Chiba.

== Career ==
After attending, Sugiyama was picked by JEF United Chiba in July 2017, only to debut in J2 League in March 2018.

== Club statistics ==
Updated to 1 January 2020.

Club performance			League		Cup		Total	
Season	Club	League	Apps	Goals	Apps	Goals	Apps	Goals
Japan			League		Emperor's Cup		Total	
2018	JEF United Chiba	J2 League	3	0	0	0	3	0
2019	Kataller Toyama	J3 League	0	0	0	0	0	0
Total			3	0	0	0	3	0
