= Hiroki Yamamoto (footballer) =

Japanese footballer (born 1991)

Hiroki Yamamoto 山本 大貴
Personal information
- Full name: Hiroki Yamamoto
- Date of birth: November 15, 1991 (age 34)
- Place of birth: Uto, Kumamoto, Japan
- Height: 1.78 m (5 ft 10 in)
- Position: Forward

Youth career
- 2010–2013: Komazawa University

Senior career*
Years	Team	Apps	(Gls)
2014–2015	Vegalta Sendai	17	(1)
2014	→ Matsumoto Yamaga (loan)	26	(7)
2016–2019	Matsumoto Yamaga	83	(8)
2019	→ Fagiano Okayama (loan)	10	(2)
2020–2021	Fagiano Okayama	68	(8)
2022–2023	Nagano Parceiro	50	(17)
Total		254	(43)
- * Club domestic league appearances and goals

Hiroki Yamamoto (山本 大貴, Yamamoto Hiroki; born November 15, 1991) is a Japanese former footballer who played as a forward.

== Career ==
=== Vegalta Sendai ===
Hiroki Yamamoto joined the J1 League club Vegalta Sendai in 2014. He made his debut for Vegalta against Urawa Red Diamonds on the 6th of April 2014. Hiroki scored his first goal for the club against Sanfrecce Hiroshima on 11 July 2015, scoring in the 90th+5th minute.

=== Loan to Matsumoto Yamaga ===
In June, he moved to the J2 League club Matsumoto Yamaga FC, joining on loan. In his first season with Matsumoto, he made his first appearance for them against Fagiano Okayama, on the 7th of June 2014. He scored his first goal for Matsumoto against Avispa Fukuoka on the 5th of July 2014, scoring in the 74th minute.

=== Matsumoto Yamaga ===
In 2016, he went to Matsumoto Yamaga FC, this time joining permanently. During his second spell with the club, Hiroki made his league debut against Roasso Kumamoto on 28 February 2016. He scored his first goal for the club against Yokohama on 6 March 2016, scoring in the 1st minute.

=== Loan to Fagiano Okayama ===
He made his debut for Fagiano against Albirex Niigata on the 17th of August 2019, also scoring his debut goal for them in the 63rd minute.

=== Fagiano Okayama ===
Hiroki joined Fagiano Okayama permanently. He made his league debut for the club against Zweigen Kanazawa on 23 February 2020. Hiroki scored his first goal for the club against Ehime on 15 July 2020, scoring in the 55th minute.

=== Nagano Parceiro ===
He made his debut for Nagano Parceiro against YSCC on the 16th of April 2022. He scored his first goal for Nagano against Gainare Tottori on the 16th of July 2022, scoring the winner in the 2nd minute. On November 30, 2023, it was announced his contract would not be renewed. He announced his retirement on 30 January 2024.

== Club statistics ==
Appearances and goals by club, season and competition
Club	Season	League			National cup (Note: Includes Emperors Cup)		League cup (Note: Includes J.League Cup)		Total	
Club	Season	Division	Apps	Goals	Apps	Goals	Apps	Goals	Apps	Goals
Komazawa University	2010	–			2	0	–		2	0
Vegalta Sendai	2014	J.League Division 1	2	0	0	0	2	0	4	0
Vegalta Sendai	2015	J1 League	15	1	2	0	3	0	20	1
Vegalta Sendai	Total		17	1	2	0	5	0	24	1
Matsumoto Yamaga (loan)	2014	J.League Division 2	26	7	2	0	0	0	28	7
Matsumoto Yamaga	2016	J2 League	37	5	2	1	0	0	39	6
Matsumoto Yamaga	2017	J2 League	31	3	3	0	0	0	34	3
Matsumoto Yamaga	2018	J2 League	14	0	1	0	0	0	15	0
Matsumoto Yamaga	2019	J1 League	1	0	1	0	0	0	2	0
Matsumoto Yamaga	Total		83	8	7	1	0	0	90	9
Fagiano Okayama (loan)	2019	J2 League	10	2	0	0	–		10	2
Fagiano Okayama	2020	J2 League	42	6	0	0	–		42	6
Fagiano Okayama	2021	J2 League	26	2	2	0	–		28	2
Fagiano Okayama	Total		68	8	2	0	0	0	70	8
AC Nagano Parceiro	2022	J3 League	23	9	0	0	–		23	9
AC Nagano Parceiro	2023	J3 League	27	8	1	1	–		28	9
AC Nagano Parceiro	Total		50	17	1	1	0	0	51	18
Career total			254	43	16	2	5	0	275	45
