= Masaru Kato =

Japanese footballer

Masaru Kato 加藤 大
Personal information
- Full name: Masaru Kato
- Date of birth: May 7, 1991 (age 35)
- Place of birth: Fukuoka, Japan
- Height: 1.75 m (5 ft 9 in)
- Position: Midfielder

Team information
- Current team: Tochigi City FC
- Number: 18

Youth career
- 2007–2009: Mitsubishi Yowa

Senior career*
Years	Team	Apps	(Gls)
2010–2020	Albirex Niigata	147	(3)
2012–2013	→ Ehime FC (loan)	61	(11)
2019	→ Avispa Fukuoka (loan)	15	(0)
2020	→ V-Varen Nagasaki (loan)	32	(1)
2021–2025	V-Varen Nagasaki	130	(9)
2026–	Tochigi City FC	19	(0)

International career
2011	Japan U-19	3	(0)
- * Club domestic league appearances and goals as of 1 January 2026

Masaru Kato (加藤 大, Katō Masaru; born May 7, 1991) is a Japanese footballer who plays as a midfielder for Tochigi City FC.

== Career ==
Born in Fukuoka, Kato signed for Albirex Niigata in September 2009, joining them from the Mitsubishi Yowa Academy. He made his debut on 11 September 2010 in the J. League match against Gamba Osaka at the Big Swan, which Albirex lost 1–2.

He has represented the Japan national team at numerous youth levels.

== Career statistics ==
Updated to end of 2018 season.

Appearances and goals by club, season and competition
Club	Season	League			Emperor's Cup		J.League Cup		Total	
Club	Season	Division	Apps	Goals	Apps	Goals	Apps	Goals	Apps	Goals
Albirex Niigata	2010	J1 League	4	0	2	0	0	0	6	0
Albirex Niigata	2011	J1 League	2	0	1	0	0	0	3	0
Ehime FC	2012	J2 League	19	2	0	0	-		19	2
Ehime FC	2013	J2 League	42	9	1	0	-		43	9
Albirex Niigata	2014	J1 League	6	0	0	0	4	0	10	0
Albirex Niigata	2015	J1 League	20	1	0	0	5	0	25	1
Albirex Niigata	2016	J1 League	28	0	2	0	5	0	35	0
Albirex Niigata	2017	J1 League	33	1	2	1	3	0	38	2
Albirex Niigata	2018	J2 League	38	1	1	0	0	0	39	1
Career total			192	14	9	1	17	0	218	15
