= Ryoma Ishida =

Japanese footballer

Personal information
- Date of birth: June 21, 1996 (age 30)
- Place of birth: Kosai, Shizuoka, Japan
- Height: 1.68 m (5 ft 6 in)
- Position: Full-back

Team information
- Current team: FC Gifu
- Number: 5

Youth career
- Kosai FC
- 2009–2014: Júbilo Iwata

Senior career*
Years	Team	Apps	(Gls)
2015–2021	Júbilo Iwata	11	(0)
2015	→ J.League U-22 Selection (loan)	5	(0)
2017–2018	→ Zweigen Kanazawa (loan)	66	(0)
2019	→ Renofa Yamaguchi (loan)	14	(2)
2022-2023	SC Sagamihara	54	(1)
2023-2024	Iwate Grulla Morioka	29	(1)
2024-	FC Gifu	49	(0)

International career
2013	Japan U-17	3	(0)
Medal record
Representing Japan
AFC U-16 Championship
Silver medal – second place	2012 Iran
- * Club domestic league appearances and goals as of 1 January 2026

Ryoma Ishida (石田 崚真, Ishida, Ryoma; born June 21, 1996 in Shizuoka) is a Japanese football player for FC Gifu.

== National team career ==
In October 2013, Ishida was elected Japan U-17 national team for 2013 U-17 World Cup. He played 3 matches.

== Career statistics ==
Updated to 19 February 2019.

Appearances and goals by club, season and competition
Club	Season	League			Emperor's Cup		J.League Cup		Total	
Club	Season	Division	Apps	Goals	Apps	Goals	Apps	Goals	Apps	Goals
Júbilo Iwata	2015	J2 League	0	0	1	0	—		1	0
Júbilo Iwata	2016	J1 League	5	0	3	0	5	0	13	0
Zweigen Kanazawa	2017	J2 League	41	0	2	0	—		43	0
Zweigen Kanazawa	2018	J2 League	25	0	2	0	—		27	0
Career total			71	0	8	0	5	0	84	0
