= Hikaru Manabe =

Japanese footballer

Hikaru Manabe 眞鍋 旭輝
Personal information
- Date of birth: 17 October 1997 (age 29)
- Place of birth: Kumamoto, Japan
- Height: 1.82 m (6 ft 0 in)
- Position: Defender

Team information
- Current team: Tegevajaro Miyazaki
- Number: 28

Youth career
- Azzurrino Kumamoto
- –2012: Blaze Kumamoto
- 2013–2015: Ohzu High School

College career
Years	Team	Apps	(Gls)
2016–2019	Toin University of Yokohama		

Senior career*
Years	Team	Apps	(Gls)
2019–2022	Renofa Yamaguchi	58	(0)
2023–	Tegevajaro Miyazaki	57	(1)
- * Club domestic league appearances and goals as of 16 August 2026

Hikaru Manabe (眞鍋 旭輝, Manabe Hikaru; born 17 October 1997) is a Japanese footballer currently playing as a defender for Tegevajaro Miyazaki.

== Career ==
On 21 December 2022, Manabe joined to J3 club, Tegevajaro Miyazaki for upcoming 2023 season.

== Career statistics ==
=== Club ===
As of the end 2022 season.

Club	Season	League			National Cup		League Cup		Other		Total	
Club	Season	Division	Apps	Goals	Apps	Goals	Apps	Goals	Apps	Goals	Apps	Goals
Toin University	2019	–			1 (Note: Appearance(s) in Emperor's Cup)	0	–		0	0	1	0
Renofa Yamaguchi	2019	J2 League	0	0	0	0	0	0	0	0	0	0
Renofa Yamaguchi	2020	J2 League	20	0	0	0	0	0	0	0	20	0
Renofa Yamaguchi	2021	J2 League	12	0	1	0	0	0	0	0	0	0
Renofa Yamaguchi	2022	J2 League	27	0	1	0	0	0	0	0	20	0
Renofa Yamaguchi	Total		59	0	3	0	0	0	0	0	62	0
Tegevajaro Miyazaki	2023	J3 League	0	0	0	0	0	0	0	0	0	0
Tegevajaro Miyazaki	Total		0	0	0	0	0	0	0	0	0	0
Career total			59	0	3	0	0	0	0	0	62	0
