= Junior Barros =

Brazilian footballer

Personal information
- Full name: Junior de Barros
- Date of birth: April 19, 1993 (age 33)
- Place of birth: Carmo da Mata, Brazil
- Height: 1.83 m (6 ft 0 in)
- Position: Forward

Youth career
- Atlético Paranaense

Senior career*
Years	Team	Apps	(Gls)
2012–2015	Atlético Paranaense	13	(1)
2014	→ XV de Novembro (loan)	3	(0)
2014	→ Icasa (loan)	5	(1)
2016–2017	Guaranì MG	10	(1)
2017	→ Anápolis (loan)	4	(0)
2017–2021	Ventforet Kofu	36	(15)
2019	→ FC Gifu (loan)	9	(0)
2021	Ho Chi Minh City	8	(1)
2022	Visakha		
- * Club domestic league appearances and goals as of 18:58, 24 February 2024 (UTC)

Junior Barros (born April 19, 1993) is a Brazilian former football player who played as a forward.

== Club statistics ==
Updated to end of 2018 season.

Club performance			League		Cup		League Cup		Total	
Season	Club	League	Apps	Goals	Apps	Goals	Apps	Goals	Apps	Goals
Japan			League		Emperor's Cup		Emperor's Cup		Total	
2017	Ventforet Kofu	J1 League	1	0	0	0	0	0	1	0
2018	Ventforet Kofu	J2 League	19	11	0	0	4	2	23	13
Total			20	11	0	0	4	2	24	13
