= Masayuki Yamada =

Japanese footballer

Masayuki Yamada 山田 将之
Personal information
- Full name: Masayuki Yamada
- Date of birth: October 1, 1994 (age 32)
- Place of birth: Tokorozawa, Japan
- Height: 1.86 m (6 ft 1 in)
- Position: Centre back

Team information
- Current team: Fukushima United FC
- Number: 2

Youth career
- 2010–2012: Aomori Yamada High School

College career
Years	Team	Apps	(Gls)
2013–2016	Hosei University		

Senior career*
Years	Team	Apps	(Gls)
2016–2021	FC Tokyo	3	(1)
2016–2018	→ FC Tokyo U-23 (loan)	54	(4)
2019	→ Machida Zelvia (loan)	0	(0)
2019	→ Avispa Fukuoka (loan)	11	(1)
2020	→ Zweigen Kanazawa (loan)	3	(0)
2020–2021	→ Omiya Ardija (loan)	27	(1)
2022–2023	Omiya Ardija	9	(0)
2024–	Fukushima United FC	61	(1)
- * Club domestic league appearances and goals as of 1 January 2026

Masayuki Yamada (山田 将之, Yamada Masayuki; born October 1, 1994) is a Japanese football player. He plays for Fukushima United FC.

== Career ==
Masayuki Yamada joined FC Tokyo in 2016. On march 20, he debuted in J3 League (v FC Ryukyu).

== Club statistics ==
Updated to 14 February 2020.

Club performance			League		Cup		League Cup		Total	
Season	Club	League	Apps	Goals	Apps	Goals	Apps	Goals	Apps	Goals
Japan			League		Emperor's Cup		J. League Cup		Total	
2016	FC Tokyo U-23	J3 League	7	0	–		–		7	0
2017	FC Tokyo	J1 League	3	1	0	0	2	0	5	1
2017	FC Tokyo U-23	J3 League	25	3	–		–		25	3
2018	FC Tokyo	J1 League	0	0	0	0	4	0	4	0
2018	FC Tokyo U-23	J3 League	22	1	–		–		22	1
2019	Machida Zelvia	J2 League	0	0	0	0	–		0	0
2019	Avispa Fukuoka	J2 League	11	1	0	0	–		11	1
Total			68	6	0	0	6	0	74	6
