= Kazuya Murata (footballer) =

Japanese footballer

Kazuya Murata 村田 和哉
Personal information
- Full name: Kazuya Murata
- Date of birth: 7 October 1988 (age 38)
- Place of birth: Moriyama, Shiga, Japan
- Height: 1.68 m (5 ft 6 in)
- Position: Midfielder

Youth career
- 2007–2010: Osaka University of Health and Sport Sciences

Senior career*
Years	Team	Apps	(Gls)
2011–2012	Cerezo Osaka	19	(2)
2013–2018	Shimizu S-Pulse	129	(11)
2019–2020	Kashiwa Reysol	1	(0)
2019	→ Avispa Fukuoka (loan)	4	(0)
2020	→ Renofa Yamaguchi (loan)	13	(0)
- * Club domestic league appearances and goals as of 21:56, 16 January 2021 (UTC)

Kazuya Murata (村田 和哉, born 7 October 1988) is a Japanese football player.

== Career statistics ==
=== Club ===
Updated to end of 2018 season.

Appearances and goals by club, season and competition
Club	Season	League		Cup^{1}		League Cup^{2}		Continental^{3}		Total	
Club	Season	Apps	Goals	Apps	Goals	Apps	Goals	Apps	Goals	Apps	Goals
Cerezo Osaka	2011	6	1	5	1	1	0	1	0	13	2
Cerezo Osaka	2012	13	1	1	1	7	0	—		21	2
Shimizu S-Pulse	2013	23	1	2	0	2	0	—		27	1
Shimizu S-Pulse	2014	29	3	5	0	3	0	—		37	3
Shimizu S-Pulse	2015	15	1	1	0	3	0	—		19	1
Shimizu S-Pulse	2016	36	5	2	0	—		—		38	5
Shimizu S-Pulse	2017	19	0	3	0	5	0	—		27	0
Shimizu S-Pulse	2018	7	1	1	0	6	1	—		14	2
Total		148	13	20	2	27	1	1	0	196	16

^{1}Includes Emperor's Cup.

^{2}Includes J. League Cup.

^{3}Includes AFC Champions League.
