= Ayumu Nagato =

Japanese footballer

Ayumu Nagato 永藤 歩
Personal information
- Date of birth: December 25, 1997 (age 28)
- Place of birth: Chiba, Japan
- Height: 1.68 m (5 ft 6 in)
- Position: Forward

Senior career*
Years	Team	Apps	(Gls)
2016–2019	Montedio Yamagata	30	(3)
2018	→ Thespakusatsu Gunma (loan)	2	(0)
2019	→ Maruyasu Okazaki (loan)	13	(4)
- * Club domestic league appearances and goals

Ayumu Nagato (永藤 歩, Nagatō Ayumu; born December 25, 1997) is a retired Japanese football player.

== Career ==
Ayumu Nagato joined J2 League club Montedio Yamagata in 2016. After two seasons in J2 with Montedio, he joined on loan newly-relegated J3 team Thespakusatsu Gunma.

On 30 December 2019 Montedio Yamagata and 22-year old Nagato confirmed, that he had decided to retire.

== Club statistics ==
Updated to end of 2018 season.

Club performance			League		Cup		Total	
Season	Club	League	Apps	Goals	Apps	Goals	Apps	Goals
Japan			League		Emperor's Cup		Total	
2016	Montedio Yamagata	J2 League	11	1	0	0	11	1
2017	Montedio Yamagata	J2 League	19	2	1	0	20	2
2018	Thespakusatsu Gunma	J3 League	2	0	0	0	2	0
Total			32	3	1	0	33	3
