= Ryuhei Yamamoto =

Japanese footballer

Personal information
- Date of birth: 16 July 2000 (age 26)
- Place of birth: Mie, Japan
- Height: 1.72 m (5 ft 8 in)
- Position: Left midfielder

Team information
- Current team: Renofa Yamaguchi
- Number: 77

Youth career
- Kawashima SSS
- –2015: TSV 1973 Yokkaichi
- 2016–2018: Yokkaichi Chuo Kogyo High School

Senior career*
Years	Team	Apps	(Gls)
2019–2025	Matsumoto Yamaga	98	(3)
2019	→ Montedio Yamagata (loan)	0	(0)
2021	→ Nagano Parceiro (loan)	24	(0)
2026–	Renofa Yamaguchi	8	(0)
- * Club domestic league appearances and goals as of 21 August 2026

Ryuhei Yamamoto (山本 龍平, Yamamoto Ryuhei; born 16 July 2000) is a Japanese footballer currently playing as a left midfielder for Renofa Yamaguchi.

== Career statistics ==
=== Club ===
As of 28 March 2021.

Club	Season	League			National Cup		League Cup		Other		Total	
Club	Season	Division	Apps	Goals	Apps	Goals	Apps	Goals	Apps	Goals	Apps	Goals
Matsumoto Yamaga	2019	J1 League	0	0	0	0	2 (Note: Appearances in the J. League Cup)	0	0	0	2	0
Matsumoto Yamaga	2020	J2 League	8	0	0	0	0	0	0	0	8	0
Matsumoto Yamaga	2021	J2 League	0	0	0	0	0	0	0	0	0	0
Matsumoto Yamaga	Total		8	0	0	0	2	0	0	0	10	0
Montedio Yamagata (loan)	2019	J2 League	0	0	0	0	0	0	0	0	0	0
Nagano Parceiro (loan)	2021	J3 League	3	0	0	0	–		0	0	3	0
Career total			11	0	0	0	2	0	0	0	14	0
