= Kyosuke Goto =

Japanese footballer

Kyosuke Goto 後藤 京介
Personal information
- Full name: Kyosuke Goto
- Date of birth: July 29, 1992 (age 34)
- Place of birth: Tokyo, Japan
- Height: 1.78 m (5 ft 10 in)
- Position: Midfielder

Team information
- Current team: Tokyo Musashino United FC

Youth career
- Waseda Club Forza '02
- –2010: Mitsubishi Yowa

College career
Years	Team	Apps	(Gls)
2011–2014	Senshu University		

Senior career*
Years	Team	Apps	(Gls)
2015	Mogren	12	(1)
2015–2016	Iskra Danilovgrad	8	(0)
2017–2018	YSCC Yokohama	56	(7)
2019–2020	Ventforet Kofu	1	(0)
2019	→ Thespakusatsu Gunma (loan)	10	(2)
2020-2021	→ Iwate Grulla Morioka (loan)	24	(0)
2021	Ventforet Kofu	2	(0)
2021-2022	ReinMeer Aomori	27	(3)
2022-	Tokyo Musashino United FC	52	(2)
Total		192	(15)
- * Club domestic league appearances and goals as of 26/1/24 @ 18:18(AEST)

Kyosuke Goto (後藤 京介, Goto Kyosuke; born July 29, 1992) is a Japanese football player.

== Career ==
From 2015, Kyosuke Goto played Montenegrin First League club Mogren and Iskra Danilovgrad. In 2017 he moved to J3 League club YSCC Yokohama.

== Career statistics ==
Updated to 22 February 2018.

Appearances and goals by club, season and competition
Club	Season	League			Emperor's Cup		Total	
Club	Season	Division	Apps	Goals	Apps	Goals	Apps	Goals
YSCC Yokohama	2017	J3 League	24	3	1	0	25	3
Career total			24	3	1	0	25	3
