= Daichi Inui =

Japanese footballer

Daichi Inui 乾 大知
Personal information
- Full name: Daichi Inui
- Date of birth: December 2, 1989 (age 36)
- Place of birth: Takasaki, Gunma, Japan
- Height: 1.84 m (6 ft 1/2 in)
- Position: Centre back

Team information
- Current team: Tochigi SC (on loan from Matsumoto Yamaga)

Youth career
- 2008–2011: Ryutsu Keizai University FC

Senior career*
Years	Team	Apps	(Gls)
2012–2016	Thespakusatsu Gunma	100	(4)
2017–2018	V-Varen Nagasaki	40	(4)
2018	→ Sagan Tosu (loan)	0	(0)
2019	Yokohama FC	5	(0)
2019	→ Tochigi SC (loan)	19	(2)
2020–	Matsumoto Yamaga	16	(1)
2021–	→ Tochigi SC (loan)	0	(0)
- * Club domestic league appearances and goals as of 17:36, 13 January 2021 (UTC)

Daichi Inui (乾 大知, Inui Daichi; born December 2, 1989) is a Japanese football player currently playing for Tochigi SC on loan from Matsumoto Yamaga FC.

== Club statistics ==
Updated to 23 February 2018.

Club performance			League		Cup		Total	
Season	Club	League	Apps	Goals	Apps	Goals	Apps	Goals
Japan			League		Emperor's Cup		Total	
2010	Ryutsu Keizai University	JFL	16	0	-		16	0
2012	Thespa Kusatsu / Thespakusatsu Gunma	J2 League	7	0	0	0	7	0
2013	Thespa Kusatsu / Thespakusatsu Gunma	J2 League	34	2	1	0	35	0
2014	Thespa Kusatsu / Thespakusatsu Gunma	J2 League	9	0	0	0	9	0
2015	Thespa Kusatsu / Thespakusatsu Gunma	J2 League	21	0	1	0	22	0
2016	Thespa Kusatsu / Thespakusatsu Gunma	J2 League	29	2	1	0	30	2
2017	V-Varen Nagasaki	J2 League	40	4	0	0	40	4
Total			140	8	3	0	143	8
