= Hiroki Mawatari =

Japanese footballer

Hiroki Mawatari 馬渡 洋樹
Personal information
- Full name: Hiroki Mawatari
- Date of birth: August 16, 1994 (age 32)
- Place of birth: Fukuoka, Japan
- Height: 1.87 m (6 ft 1 1/2 in)
- Position: Goalkeeper

Team information
- Current team: Tokyo Verdy
- Number: 31

Youth career
- Fukusho Tonakai SC
- 2010–2012: Higashi Fukuoka High School

College career
Years	Team	Apps	(Gls)
2013–2016	NIFS Kanoya		

Senior career*
Years	Team	Apps	(Gls)
2017–2019	Ehime FC	1	(0)
2019	→ Kawasaki Frontale (loan)	0	(0)
2020	Kawasaki Frontale	0	(0)
2020–2022	Fagiano Okayama	0	(0)
2022	→ Shonan Bellmare (loan)	1	(0)
2023–2024	Shonan Bellmare	4	(0)
2025–	Tokyo Verdy	0	(0)
- * Club domestic league appearances and goals as of 18:10, 8 April 2023 (UTC)

Hiroki Mawatari (馬渡 洋樹, Mawatari Hiroki; born August 16, 1994) is a Japanese footballer who plays as a goalkeeper for J1 League club Tokyo Verdy.

== Career ==
Hiroki Mawatari joined J2 League club Ehime FC in 2017.

== Club statistics ==
As of end of 2024 season.

Appearances and goals by club, season and competition
Club	Season	League			National Cup		League Cup		Total	
Club	Season	Division	Apps	Goals	Apps	Goals	Apps	Goals	Apps	Goals
Japan			League		Emperor's Cup		J. League Cup		Total	
Ehime FC	2017	J2 League	1	0	2	0	–		3	0
Ehime FC	2018	J2 League	0	0	1	0	–		1	0
Ehime FC	2019	J2 League	0	0	0	0	–		0	0
Ehime FC	Total		1	0	3	0	0	0	4	0
Kawasaki Frontale (loan)	2019	J1 League	0	0	0	0	0	0	0	0
Kawasaki Frontale	2020	J1 League	0	0	0	0	0	0	0	0
Fagiano Okayama	2020	J2 League	0	0	0	0	–		0	0
Fagiano Okayama	2021	J2 League	0	0	0	0	–		0	0
Fagiano Okayama	2022	J2 League	0	0	0	0	–		0	0
Fagiano Okayama	Total		0	0	0	0	0	0	0	0
Shonan Bellmare (loan)	2022	J1 League	1	0	1	0	0	0	2	0
Shonan Bellmare	2023	J1 League	2	0	0	0	1	0	3	0
Shonan Bellmare	2024	J1 League	4	0	1	0	0	0	5	0
Shonan Bellmare	Total		6	0	1	0	1	0	8	0
Career total			8	0	5	0	1	0	14	0
