= Yu Tamura (footballer) =

Japanese footballer (born 1992)

Personal information
- Full name: Yu Tamura
- Date of birth: November 22, 1992 (age 33)
- Place of birth: Kitakyushu, Fukuoka, Japan
- Height: 1.85 m (6 ft 1 in)
- Position: Midfielder

Youth career
- 2011–2014: Fukuoka University

Senior career*
Years	Team	Apps	(Gls)
2015–2018	Avispa Fukuoka	37	(0)
2017	→ Urawa Red Diamonds (loan)	0	(0)
2018–2020	Montedio Yamagata	3	(0)
2019	→ Thespakusatsu Gunma (loan)	12	(0)
2020	→ SC Sagamihara (loan)	7	(0)
Medal record
Urawa Red Diamonds
Winner	AFC Champions League	2017
- * Club domestic league appearances and goals

Yu Tamura (田村 友, Tamura Yu; born November 22, 1992) is a Japanese retired football player.

== Club statistics ==
Updated to end of 2018 season.

Club performance			League		Cup		League Cup		Continental		Total	
Season	Club	League	Apps	Goals	Apps	Goals	Apps	Goals	Apps	Goals	Apps	Goals
Japan			League		Emperor's Cup		J. League Cup		AFC		Total	
2015	Avispa Fukuoka	J2 League	18	0	2	0	–		–		20	0
2016	Avispa Fukuoka	J1 League	16	1	1	1	6	1	–		23	3
2017	Urawa Red Diamonds	J1 League	0	0	2	0	1	0	1	0	4	0
2018	Montedio Yamagata	J2 League	4	0	2	0	–		–		6	0
Total			38	1	7	1	7	1	1	0	53	3
