= 2021 Emperor's Cup =

Tournament details
- Country: Japan
- Dates: 22 May – 19 December
- Teams: 90

Final positions
- Champions: Urawa Red Diamonds (8th title)
- Runners-up: Oita Trinita
- Champions League: Urawa Red Diamonds

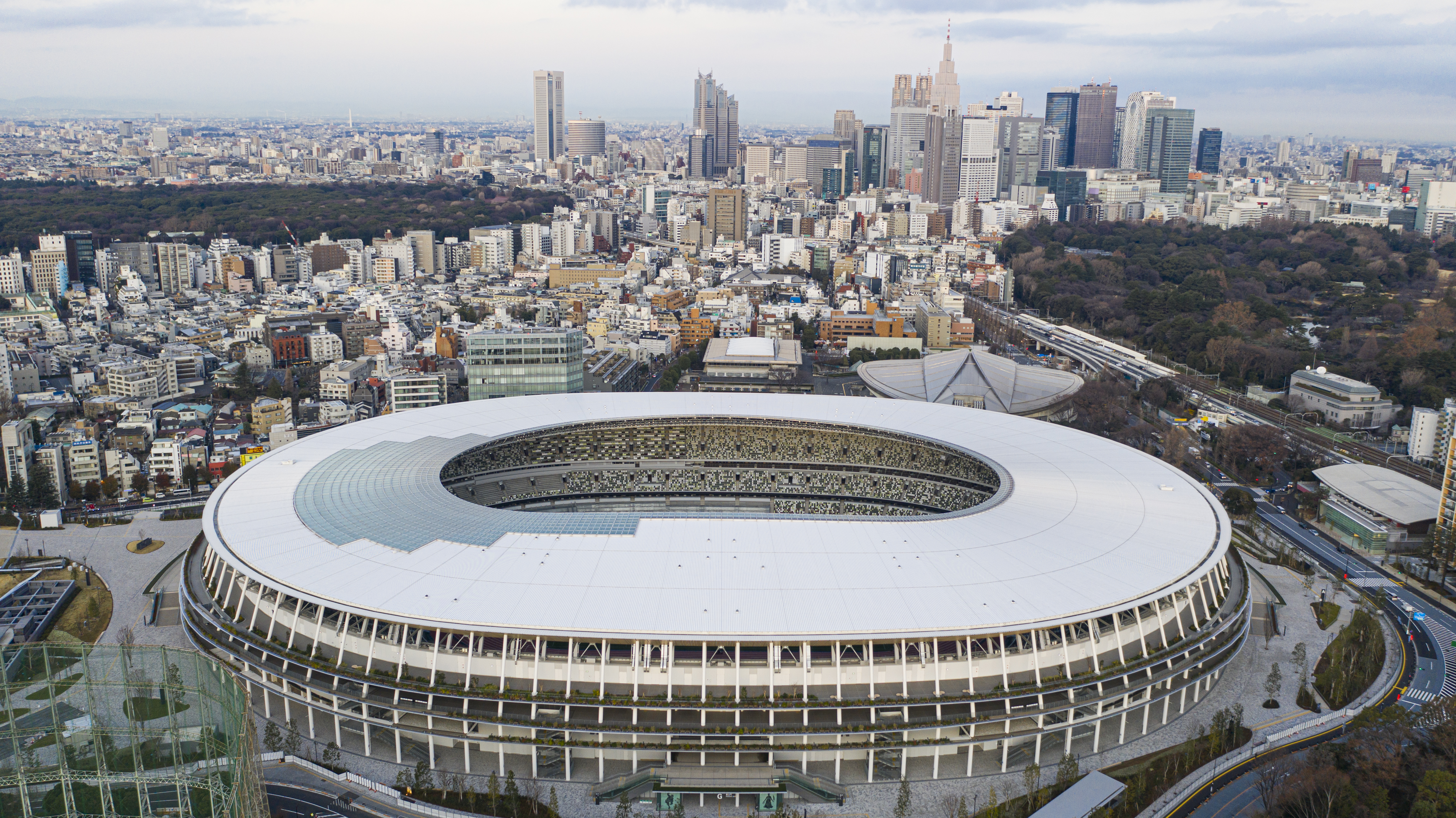

The 2021 Emperor's Cup (Emperor's Cup JFA 101st Japan Football Championship (Japanese: 天皇杯 JFA 第101回全日本サッカー選手権大会)) was the 101st annual Japanese national football cup tournament, which began on 22 May 2021 and ended with the final on 19 December that year.

Following the compressed format of the 2020 tournament, the 2021 Emperor's Cup was restored to its usual format, featuring 90 teams representing prefectural football associations as well as the J1 and J2 Leagues. Verspah Oita was also awarded a seeded entry as the JFA's annually designated amateur club.

Kawasaki Frontale were the defending champions. They were eliminated by Oita Trinita in the semi-finals. Urawa Red Diamonds won their eighth title and qualified for the 2022 AFC Champions League group stage.

== Calendar ==
The schedule was announced on 2 April 2021.

Round	Date (backup date)	Matches	Clubs	New entries this round
First round	22–23 May (24 May)	26	52 → 26	4 clubs from 2021 J2 League; 1 seeded amateur team; 47 prefectural representatives
Second round	9 June (16 June)	32	26 + 20 + 18 → 32	20 2021 J1 League clubs; 18 clubs from 2021 J2 League
Third round	7 July (14 July)	16	32 → 16	
Round of 16	18 Aug (13 Oct)	8	16 → 8	
Quarter-finals	27 Oct (17 Nov)	4	8 → 4	
Semi-finals	12 December	2	4 → 2	
Final	19 December	1	2 → 1	

== Participating clubs ==
There are 90 clubs compete in the tournament. The representatives for the prefectures of Tottori and Kumamoto had to be determined by the local FAs after COVID-19 countermeasures made it impossible to continue the prefectural qualification tournaments.

2021 J1 League all clubs join in the second round	2021 J2 League; 18 / 22 clubs join in the 2nd round, 4 clubs join in the 1st round	Amateur Best Team	47 prefectural tournament winners	
Avispa Fukuoka; Cerezo Osaka; Consadole Sapporo; Gamba Osaka; Kashima Antlers; Kashiwa Reysol; Kawasaki Frontale; Nagoya Grampus; Oita Trinita; Sagan Tosu; Sanfrecce Hiroshima; Shimizu S-Pulse; Shonan Bellmare; Tokushima Vortis; FC Tokyo; Urawa Red Diamonds; Vegalta Sendai; Vissel Kobe; Yokohama F. Marinos; Yokohama FC	Entering in the first round: Blaublitz Akita; Ehime FC; Renofa Yamaguchi FC; SC Sagamihara; Entering in the second round: Albirex Niigata; Fagiano Okayama; Giravanz Kitakyushu; JEF United Chiba; Júbilo Iwata; Kyoto Sanga FC; FC Machida Zelvia; Matsumoto Yamaga FC; Mito HollyHock; Montedio Yamagata; Omiya Ardija; FC Ryukyu; Thespakusatsu Gunma; Tochigi SC; Tokyo Verdy; V-Varen Nagasaki; Ventforet Kofu; Zweigen Kanazawa	Verspah Oita	Hokkaido: Hokkaido Tokachi Sky Earth; Aomori: Vanraure Hachinohe; Iwate: Iwate Grulla Morioka; Miyagi: Sony Sendai FC; Akita: Saruta Kōgyō S.C.; Yamagata: Oyama SC; Fukushima: Iwaki FC; Ibaraki: Ryutsu Keizai University; Tochigi: Tochigi City FC; Gunma: Tonan Maebashi; Saitama: Aventura Kawaguchi; Chiba: Juntendo University; Tokyo: Komazawa University; Kanagawa: YSCC Yokohama; Yamanashi: Nirasaki Astros; Nagano: AC Nagano Parceiro; Niigata: Niigata University of Health and Welfare FC; Toyama: Kataller Toyama; Ishikawa: FC Hokuriku; Fukui: Fukui United FC; Shizuoka: Honda FC; Aichi: FC Kariya; Mie: Suzuka Point Getters; Gifu: FC Gifu	Shiga: Biwako Seikei Sport College; Kyoto: Ococias Kyoto AC; Osaka: F.C. Osaka; Hyōgo: Kwansei Gakuin University; Nara: Porvenir Asuka; Wakayama: Arterivo Wakayama; Tottori: Gainare Tottori; Shimane: Matsue City FC; Okayama: Mitsubishi Mizushima FC; Hiroshima: Fukuyama City FC; Yamaguchi: FC Baleine Shimonoseki; Kagawa: Kamatamare Sanuki; Tokushima: FC Tokushima; Ehime: FC Imabari; Kōchi: Kochi United SC; Fukuoka: Fukuoka University; Saga: Kawasoe Club; Nagasaki: MD Nagasaki; Kumamoto: Roasso Kumamoto; Ōita: Nippon Bunri University; Miyazaki: Honda Lock SC; Kagoshima: Kagoshima United FC; Okinawa: Okinawa SV

Note

1. Original prefecture winners Yamanashi Gakuin University Pegasus were disqualified after fielding ineligible players during the final against Nirasaki Astros.
2. Despite recruiting their players from the respective universities, Niigata University of Health and Welfare FC, and FC Hokuriku (both Hokushinetsu Football League) are independent teams competing in men's leagues sanctioned by the Japan Football Association and serve as de facto reserve teams feeding into their respective schools' senior squads, which compete in the university football leagues of Japan.

== Bracket ==
Source:Tournament table (Official website in Japanese)

== First round ==
The match between Tochigi City and the representatives of Yamanashi Prefecture, originally intended to be Yamanashi Gakuin University Pegasus and scheduled for 22 May, was postponed the day before by the Japan Football Association after Pegasus fielded an ineligible cup-tied player in the Yamanashi Prefecture Cup final. Note that Pegasus operates functionally as YGU's second team and competed in the Yamanashi tournament alongside the YGU third team, known as Orions; the first team YGU Braves also competed in Emperor's Cup qualifiers in Tokyo Metropolis. Subsequent to an investigation, the JFA decided on 24 May that YGU Pegasus would be disqualified and awarded their spot to Nirasaki Astros, their opponents in the Yamanashi final.

Also postponed was the match between Tonan Maebashi and Juntendo University after an individual affiliated with Juntendo tested positive for COVID-19. The match was eventually rescheduled for 5 June.

22 May 2021 1	AC Nagano Parceiro	3–1 (a.e.t.)	Niigata University HW FC	Nagano
13:00 JST	Miyasaka 73'; Mizutani 99'; Sano 116'	Report	Maruyama 90'	Stadium: Minami Nagano Sports Park Stadium

23 May 2021 1	Fukuyama City FC	2–1	Matsue City FC	Hiroshima
13:00 JST	Takahashi 59'; Taguchi 90+4'	Report	Hotta 83'	Stadium: Edion Stadium Hiroshima No. 1 Field; Attendance: 0 Referee: Kakuro Hori

23 May 2021 1	Iwate Grulla Morioka	13–0	Oyama SC	Morioka
13:00 JST	Yomesaka 14'; Han Yong-thae 20'; Tabinas 34'; Otabor 36' 68'; Tabira 40'; Brenner 41' 84'; Takeda 59'; Yamakawa 70' 90+2'; Kurishima 85'; Shikama 90'	Report		Stadium: Iwagin Stadium; Attendance: 220; Referee: Tomoyuki Umeda

22 May 2021 1	Arterivo Wakayama	3–3 (a.e.t.) (4–5 p)	Ococias Kyoto AC	Wakayama
13:00 JST	Okutsu 31'; Kubo 55'; Nakanishi 73'	Report	Enomoto 15'; Inagaki 20'; Hiraishi 86'	Stadium: Kimiidera Athletic Stadium
	Penalties
	Utsugi (penalty scored); Shinohara (penalty scored); Okita (penalty scored); Takase (penalty scored); Pek Myong-chol (penalty missed)		Enomoto (penalty scored); Hiraishi (penalty scored); Shimizu (penalty scored); Kokubo (penalty scored); Moriya (penalty scored)

22 May 2021 1	Renofa Yamaguchi	1–1 (a.e.t.) (2–4 p)	Verspah Oita	Yamaguchi
15:00 JST	Umeki 38'	Report	Nakano 30'	Stadium: Ishin Me-Life Stadium; Referee: Tatsuya Sakai
	Penalties
	Ikegami (penalty scored); Sato (penalty scored); Komatsu (penalty missed); Sawai (penalty missed)		Maeda (penalty scored); Takahashi (penalty scored); Murata (penalty scored); Nakamura (penalty scored)

22 May 2021 1	FC Gifu	0–2	Honda FC	Gifu
13:00 JST		Report	Hachinohe 66'; Kodama 90+1'	Stadium: Gifu Nagaragawa Meadow; Attendance: 0 Referee: Shingo Kuniyoshi

23 May 2021 1	Blaublitz Akita	1–1 (8–9 p)	Hokkaido Tokachi Sky Earth	Akita
13:00 JST	Inoue 61'	Report	Nawa 36'	Stadium: Soyu Stadium; Attendance: 534; Referee: Keisuke Nobori
	Penalties
	Mikami (penalty scored); Yamada (penalty scored); Fukoin (penalty scored); Take (penalty scored); Yoshida (penalty scored); Aoshima (penalty scored); Aiba (penalty scored); Suzuki (penalty scored); Iio (penalty missed)		Yamashita (penalty scored); Tanaka (penalty scored); Nagasaka (penalty scored); Kizawa (penalty scored); Nawa (penalty scored); Watanabe (penalty scored); Takagi (penalty scored); Sato (penalty scored); Kawamoto (penalty scored)

23 May 2021 1	Gainare Tottori	4–1	FC Tokushima	Tottori
13:00 JST	Arai 43'; Okubo 68' 81'; Kani 77'	Report	Fujiyama 90'	Stadium: Axis Bird Stadium; Attendance: 0 Referee: Hiroki Tani

22 May 2021 1	Roasso Kumamoto	3–0	Nippon Bunri University	Kumamoto
11:00 JST	Kawahara 32'; Ito 70'; Iwashita 90+2'	Report		Stadium: Egao Kenko Stadium; Attendance: 0 Referee: Akinori Matsuo

23 May 2021 1	Kagoshima United FC	4–0	MD Nagasaki	Minamisatsuma
13:00 JST	Yamamoto 40'; Yonezawa 79'; Ishizu 83'; Yamaya 88'	Report		Stadium: Osako Yuya Stadium; Attendance: 0 Referee: Kazuya Miyahara

22 May 2021 1	Ryutsu Keizai University	2–3	YSCC Yokohama	Hitachinaka
13:00 JST	Yasui 22'; Ieizumi 70'	Report	Dodate 25' 46'; Nduka 80'	Stadium: Hitachinaka City Stadium; Attendance: 335; Referee: Koki Yasukawa

22 May 2021 1	Iwaki FC	2–2 (a.e.t.) (2–4 p)	Sony Sendai FC	Iwaki
13:00 JST	Hidaka 85'; Tanimura 115'	Report	Hirata 90+3'; Sato 101'	Stadium: Iwaki Greenfield Stadium
	Penalties
	Sakata (penalty scored); Vásquez (penalty missed); Hidaka (penalty missed); Saga (penalty scored)		Ishigami (penalty scored); Sato (penalty scored); Fujiwara (penalty scored); Ogihara (penalty scored)

23 May 2021 1	Fukuoka University	1–3 (a.e.t.)	Okinawa SV	Fukuoka
13:00 JST	Hojo 15'	Report	Shoji 47'; Sugiyama 92'; Akagi 105+1'	Stadium: Best Denki Stadium; Attendance: 282; Referee: Shinya Sasaki

23 May 2021 1	Biwako Seikei Sport College	0–2	Kwansei Gakuin University	Higashiomi
13:00 JST		Report	Masui 45+1'; Yamami 59'	Stadium: Nunobiki Green Stadium; Attendance: 242; Referee: Yasuyuki Matsumoto

23 May 2021 1	Vanraure Hachinohe	13–0	Saruta Kōgyō S.C.	Hachinohe
13:00 JST	Shimada 2' 29'; Kamigata 4' 20'; Tsuboi 11'; Kuroishi 26'; Aida 47' 56' 82'; Harayama 59'; Akiyoshi 63' 89'; Oka 71'	Report		Stadium: Prifoods Stadium; Attendance: 379; Referee: Kei Suzuki

23 May 2021 1	Porvenir Asuka	0–2	F.C. Osaka	Nara
13:00 JST		Report	Saito 65'; Takahashi 90+3'	Stadium: Konoike Athletic Stadium; Attendance: 410; Referee: Koji Takahashi

26 May 2021 1	Tochigi City FC	9–0	Nirasaki Astros	Utsunomiya
19:00 JST	Furuya 3' 41' 79'; Yoshida 5' 14'; H. Suzuki 53' 64' 68'; Yamashita 89'	Report		Stadium: Tochigi Green Stadium; Attendance: 266; Referee: Taku Nagaya

22 May 2021 1	Ehime FC	1–2	FC Imabari	Matsuyama
12:00 JST	Kawamura 35'	Report	Valdu Té 14'; Komano 55'	Stadium: Ningineer Stadium; Attendance: 1,552; Referee: Yoshimi Yamashita

23 May 2021 1	Kataller Toyama	8–0	FC Hokuriku	Takaoka
13:00 JST	Himeno 32'; Todaka 44'; Suzuki 55' 77'; Sasaki 63'; Matsuoka 72'; Otoizumi 86'; Takahashi 90+3'	Report		Stadium: Takaoka Sports Core; Attendance: 843; Referee: Masakazu Sato

22 May 2021 1	SC Sagamihara	3–1	Komazawa University	Hiratsuka
13:00 JST	Wada 5'; Yuri Mamute 53'; Nakayama 90+4'	Report	Aizawa 45+2'	Stadium: Lemon Gas Stadium Hiratsuka; Attendance: 614; Referee: Kazuyoshi Karashima

22 May 2021 1	Mitsubishi Mizushima FC	3–2	FC Baleine Shimonoseki	Okayama
13:00 JST	Miyazawa 1'; Yamabe 31'; Koumo 41'	Report	Hieda 39'	Stadium: City Light Stadium; Attendance: 0 Referee: Yoshihito Hori

23 May 2021 1	Suzuka Point Getters	2–1	FC Kariya	Suzuka
13:00 JST	Tamura 45+2'; Endo 51'	Report	Imai 3' (o.g.)	Stadium: Mie Sports Garden; Attendance: 0 Referee: Kenji Wakamiya

23 May 2021 1	Kochi United SC	1–0	Kamatamare Sanuki	Sukumo
14:00 JST	Fujii 55'	Report		Stadium: Sukumo City Athletics Stadium; Attendance: 465; Referee: Yusuke Ohashi

5 June 2021 1	Tonan Maebashi	1–6	Juntendo University	Maebashi
13:00 JST	Saito 1'	Report	Kobayashi 13' 17' 61'; Shirai 74'; Omori 83' 90+1'	Stadium: Gunma Shikishima Football Stadium; Attendance: 470; Referee: Yoshihito Ito

22 May 2021 1	Honda Lock SC	5–0	Kawasoe Club	Shintomi
13:00 JST	Oyama 3'; Hasegawa 35'; Hino 44'; Nagayoshi 63' 78'	Report		Stadium: Unilever Stadium Shintomi; Attendance: 0 Referee: Toshiki Tomomasa

23 May 2021 1	Fukui United FC	2–1	Aventura Kawaguchi	Fukui
13:00 JST	Nonaka 61'; Onda 78'	Report	Onda 41' (o.g.)	Stadium: Technoport Fukui Stadium; Attendance: 358; Referee: Kenya Ohara

== Second round ==
9 June 2021 2	Kawasaki Frontale	1–1 (a.e.t.) (4–3 p)	AC Nagano Parceiro	Kawasaki
18:00 JST	Tachibanada 90+1'	Report	Fujiyama 42'	Stadium: Kawasaki Todoroki Stadium; Attendance: 4,508; Referee: Keigo Sendachi
	Penalties
	Kobayashi (penalty scored); Yamamura (penalty scored); Kurumaya (penalty scored); Tono (penalty missed); Ienaga (penalty scored)		Fujiyama (penalty scored); Mizutani (penalty missed); Azuma (penalty missed); Yamamoto (penalty scored); Yoshimura (penalty scored)

9 June 2021 2	JEF United Chiba	1–0	Omiya Ardija	Chiba
18:00 JST	Jang Min-gyu 77'	Report		Stadium: Fukuda Denshi Arena; Attendance: 1,635; Referee: Ryosuke Yamaoka

9 June 2021 2	Shimizu S-Pulse	1–0	Fukuyama City FC	Shizuoka
19:00 JST	Hara 90+2'	Report		Stadium: IAI Stadium Nihondaira; Attendance: 1,831; Referee: Tetsuro Yoshida

9 June 2021 2	Vegalta Sendai	0–1	Iwate Grulla Morioka	Sendai
19:00 JST		Report	Han Yong-thae 2'	Stadium: Yurtec Stadium Sendai; Attendance: 2,551; Referee: Shoichiro Mikami

16 June 2021 2	Sanfrecce Hiroshima	1–5	Ococias Kyoto AC	Hiroshima
18:00 JST	Shibasaki 45+1'	Report	Aoto 28'; Takahashi 38'; Hagiwara 77'; Hayashi 80'; Ibrahim 89'	Stadium: Edion Stadium Hiroshima; Attendance: 1,114; Referee: Tetsuro Yoshida

9 June 2021 2	Montedio Yamagata	1–2	Verspah Oita	Tendo
19:00 JST	Matsumoto 16'	Report	Tone 45', 49'	Stadium: ND Soft Stadium; Attendance: 1,809; Referee: Toru Kakinuma

9 June 2021 2	Yokohama F. Marinos	2–2 (a.e.t.) (3–5 p)	Honda FC	Yokohama
18:00 JST	Élber 67'; Léo Ceará 102'	Report	Kusumoto 28'; Okazaki 106'	Stadium: NHK Spring Mitsuzawa Football Stadium; Attendance: 2,804; Referee: Hirokazu Otsubo
	Penalties
	Thiago Martins (penalty missed); Bunmathan (penalty scored); Élber (penalty scored); Marcos Júnior (penalty scored)		Okazai (penalty scored); Suzuki (penalty scored); Hirouchi (penalty scored); Hachinohe (penalty scored); Kawanami (penalty scored)

9 June 2021 2	Júbilo Iwata	3–0	Hokkaido Tokachi Sky Earth	Iwata
19:00 JST	Ogawa 56', 86'; Miki 71'	Report		Stadium: Yamaha Stadium; Attendance: 1,905; Referee: Akihiko Ikeuchi

9 June 2021 2	Cerezo Osaka	2–0	Gainare Tottori	Osaka
18:00 JST	Ōkubo 5'; Okuno 31'	Report		Stadium: Yodoko Sakura Stadium; Attendance: 0 Referee: Hajime Matsuo

9 June 2021 2	Albirex Niigata	4–1	Zweigen Kanazawa	Niigata
19:00 JST	Tagami 23'; Mito 26'; Yamura 42', 51'	Report	Motozuka 53'	Stadium: Denka Big Swan Stadium; Attendance: 3,896; Referee: Yu Fujita

9 June 2021 2	Sagan Tosu	1–0	Roasso Kumamoto	Tosu
19:00 JST	Yamashita 22'	Report		Stadium: Ekimae Real Estate Stadium; Attendance: 3,390; Referee: Dai Matsumoto

9 June 2021 2	Avispa Fukuoka	6–0	Kagoshima United FC	Fukuoka
18:00 JST	Sugimoto 34'; Croux 66', 75'; Yamagishi 71', 78', 90+1'	Report		Stadium: Best Denki Stadium; Attendance: 1,224; Referee: Hiromichi Oka

16 June 2021 2	Kashima Antlers	8–1	YSCC Yokohama	Kashima
19:00 JST	Endo 10', 31'; Everaldo Stum 12', 49'; Matsumura 21'; Ueda 52', 70', 78'	Report	Ogochukwu 83'	Stadium: Kashima Soccer Stadium; Attendance: 2,458; Referee: Yudai Yamamoto

9 June 2021 2	Tochigi SC	2–0	FC Machida Zelvia	Utsunomiya
19:00 JST	Matsuoka 15', 36'	Report		Stadium: Tochigi Green Stadium; Attendance: 837; Referee: Koki Nagamine

9 June 2021 2	Hokkaido Consadole Sapporo	5–3	Sony Sendai FC	Sapporo
18:00 JST	Ono 14'; Lucas Fernandes 16'; Nakashima 22', 28', 84'	Report	Uchino 7', 16'; Sato 56'	Stadium: Sapporo Atsubetsu Stadium; Attendance: 1,637; Referee: Nobutsugu Murakami

9 June 2021 2	V-Varen Nagasaki	2–0	Okinawa SV	Isahaya
19:00 JST	Ibarbo 29'; Otake 90'	Report		Stadium: Transcosmos Stadium Nagasaki; Attendance: 1,884; Referee: Yusuke Ohashi

16 June 2021 2	Gamba Osaka	3–1	Kwansei Gakuin University	Suita
18:00 JST	Onose 11'; Wellington Silva 21'; Patric 87'	Report	Waki 55'	Stadium: Panasonic Stadium Suita; Attendance: 4,031; Referee: Ryo Tanimoto

9 June 2021 2	Matsumoto Yamaga FC	1–0	FC Ryukyu	Matsumoto
19:00 JST	Murakoshi 52'	Report		Stadium: Sunpro Alwin; Attendance: 2,241; Referee: Tomokazu Sato

16 June 2021 2	Yokohama FC	1–2	Vanraure Hachinohe	Yokohama
18:00 JST	Kléber 88'	Report	Shimada 63'; Aida 74'	Stadium: NHK Spring Mitsuzawa Football Stadium; Attendance: 1,075; Referee: Shu Kawamata

9 June 2021 2	Shonan Bellmare	0–0 (a.e.t.) (4–3 p)	F.C. Osaka	Hiratsuka
19:00 JST		Report		Stadium: Lemon Gas Stadium Hiratsuka; Attendance: 1,385; Referee: Masaki Tsuruoka
	Penalties
	Umesaki (penalty scored); Oiwa (penalty scored); Tanaka (penalty scored); Machino (penalty scored)		Tsukegi (penalty missed); Sakamoto (penalty scored); Tanaka (penalty scored); Kitsui (penalty scored); Iwamoto (penalty missed)

9 June 2021 2	Kashiwa Reysol	3–0	Tochigi City FC	Kashiwa
18:00 JST	Cristiano 19'; Mitsumaru 35'; Angelotti 90+2'	Report		Stadium: Sankyo Frontier Kashiwa Stadium; Attendance: 1,597; Referee: Naoto Uehara

9 June 2021 2	Kyoto Sanga FC	3–1	FC Imabari	Kyoto
18:00 JST	Lee 10', 69'; Kozuki 62'	Report	Takei 82'	Stadium: Takebishi Stadium Kyoto; Attendance: 1,507; Referee: Toshihiro Nakai

9 June 2021 2	Urawa Red Diamonds	1–0	Kataller Toyama	Saitama
19:00 JST	Junker 80'	Report		Stadium: Urawa Komaba Stadium; Attendance: 4,269; Referee: Hiroki Kasahara

9 June 2021 2	Giravanz Kitakyushu	0–1	SC Sagamihara	Kitakyushu
18:00 JST		Report	Nakayama 45+1'	Stadium: Mikuni World Stadium Kitakyushu; Attendance: 837; Referee: Yuki Noda

9 June 2021 2	Nagoya Grampus	5–0	Mitsubishi Mizushima FC	Gifu
18:00 JST	Fujii 36'; Nagasawa 39'; Mateus 64', 90+1'; Ishida 89'	Report		Stadium: Gifu Nagaragawa Stadium; Attendance: 1,886; Referee: Masuya Ueda

16 June 2021 2	Tokyo Verdy	0–1	Fagiano Okayama	Kita
18:00 JST		Report	Noguchi 61'	Stadium: Ajinomoto Field Nishigaoka; Attendance: 1,016; Referee: Yoshimi Yamashita

16 June 2021 2	Vissel Kobe	4–0	Suzuka Point Getters	Kobe
18:00 JST	Tanaka 29', 61'; Kobayashi 49'; Yasui 90'	Report		Stadium: Noevir Stadium Kobe; Attendance: 1,938; Referee: Reo Tanaka

9 June 2021 2	Tokushima Vortis	2–1	Kochi United SC	Naruto
19:00 JST	Iwao 4'; Hirata 45+1' (o.g.)	Report	Shimodo 52'	Stadium: Pocarisweat Stadium; Attendance: 1,395; Referee: Koei Koya

9 June 2021 2	FC Tokyo	1–2 (a.e.t.)	Juntendo University	Kita
18:00 JST	Nagai 9'	Report	Shirai 88'; Kobayashi 105+2'	Stadium: Ajinomoto Field Nishigaoka; Attendance: 1,682; Referee: Takuto Okabe

9 June 2021 2	Mito HollyHock	0–3	Thespakusatsu Gunma	Kashima
19:00 JST		Report	Shin 39'; Takahashi 44'; Omae 71'	Stadium: Kashima Soccer Stadium; Attendance: 907; Referee: Reo Tanaka

9 June 2021 2	Oita Trinita	3–2 (a.e.t.)	Honda Lock SC	Oita
19:00 JST	Hasegawa 49'; Takazawa 74'; Inoue 108'	Report	Tanaka 80'; Suwazono 85'	Stadium: Showa Denko Dome Oita; Attendance: 1,613; Referee: Takao Nishiyama

9 June 2021 2	Ventforet Kofu	1–2	Fukui United FC	Kofu
19:00 JST	Paulo Baya 23'	Report	Kazawa 90+1'; Kanamura 90+5'	Stadium: JIT Recycle Ink Stadium; Attendance: 1,381; Referee: Tatsuya Sakai

== Third round ==
The third round schedule was announced on 17 June 2021.

21 July 2021 3	Kawasaki Frontale	1–1 (a.e.t.) (4–3 p)	JEF United Chiba	Chiba
18:00 JST	Ienaga 59' (pen.)	Report	Miki 53'	Stadium: Fukuda Denshi Arena; Referee: Hayato Shimizu
	Penalties
	Chinen (penalty scored); Yamamura (penalty scored); Hasegawa (penalty scored); Kurumaya (penalty scored)		Sakuragawa (penalty scored); Yada (penalty scored); Iwasaki (penalty missed); Fukumitsu (penalty scored); Kumagai (penalty missed)

7 July 2021 3	Shimizu S-Pulse	2–1	Iwate Grulla Morioka	Morioka
18:30 JST	Ibusuki 54'; Taki 83'	Report	Kagami 38'	Stadium: Iwagin Stadium; Attendance: 1,976; Referee: Koei Koya

7 July 2021 3	Ococias Kyoto AC	1–3	Verspah Oita	Oita
18:00 JST	Ibrahim 62'	Report	Maeda 24', 27'; Tone 59'	Stadium: Showa Denko Dome Oita; Attendance: 458; Referee: Reo Tanaka

7 July 2021 3	Honda FC	1–4	Júbilo Iwata	Iwata
18:30 JST	Suzuki 57'	Report	González 2'; Ogawa 27', 35'; Miki 85'	Stadium: Yamaha Stadium; Attendance: 4,794; Referee: Masaaki Iemoto

4 August 2021 3	Cerezo Osaka	3–2	Albirex Niigata	Osaka
18:00 JST	Kiyotake 21', 30'; Kato 67'	Report	Hoshi 66'; Homma 90+1'	Stadium: Yodoko Sakura Stadium; Attendance: 3,427; Referee: Yudai Yamamoto

7 July 2021 3	Sagan Tosu	1–0	Avispa Fukuoka	Tosu
19:00 JST	Higuchi 90+1'	Report		Stadium: Ekimae Real Estate Stadium; Attendance: 5,303; Referee: Shinji Murakami

7 July 2021 3	Kashima Antlers	3–0	Tochigi SC	Utsunomiya
19:00 JST	Everaldo Stum 80', 90'; Arthur Caíke 90+2'	Report		Stadium: Kanseki Stadium Tochigi; Attendance: 4,442; Referee: Jumpei Iida

7 July 2021 3	Hokkaido Consadole Sapporo	1–2	V-Varen Nagasaki	Isahaya
18:00 JST	Aoki 64'	Report	Otake 5'; Uenaka 7'	Stadium: Transcosmos Stadium Nagasaki; Attendance: 2,565; Referee: Hiroki Kasahara

18 August 2021 3	Gamba Osaka	2–0 (a.e.t.)	Matsumoto Yamaga FC	Suita
18:00 JST	Yanagisawa 95'; Ideguchi 100'	Report		Stadium: Panasonic Stadium Suita; Attendance: 3,123; Referee: Ryo Tanimoto

7 July 2021 3	Vanraure Hachinohe	1–2 (a.e.t.)	Shonan Bellmare	Hiratsuka
19:00 JST	Tsuboi 62'	Report	Umesaki 53'; Hiraoka 113'	Stadium: Lemon Gas Stadium Hiratsuka; Attendance: 1,452; Referee: Shoichiro Mikami

7 July 2021 3	Kashiwa Reysol	1–2	Kyoto Sanga FC	Kashiwa
18:00 JST	Toshima 12'	Report	Nakano 40'; Araki 89'	Stadium: Sankyo Frontier Kashiwa Stadium; Attendance: 1,907; Referee: Tomohiro Inoue

7 July 2021 3	Urawa Red Diamonds	1–0	SC Sagamihara	Saitama
19:00 JST	Junker 87'	Report		Stadium: Urawa Komaba Stadium; Attendance: 4,528; Referee: Takafumi Mikuriya

2 August 2021 (Note: Game originally kicked off on 14 July, but postponed at half-time due to inclement weather. The match was replayed from the beginning, with the previous in-progress match being annulled.) 3	Nagoya Grampus	1–0	Fagiano Okayama	Nagoya
18:00 JST	Nakatani 33'	Report		Stadium: Nagoya Minato Stadium; Attendance: 2,001; Referee: Takuto Okabe

7 July 2021 3	Vissel Kobe	1–0	Tokushima Vortis	Kobe
18:00 JST	Furuhashi 38'	Report		Stadium: Noevir Stadium Kobe; Attendance: 2,836; Referee: Hiroyuki Kimura

7 July 2021 3	Juntendo University	2–3 (a.e.t.)	Thespakusatsu Gunma	Maebashi
19:00 JST	Shirai 43'; Terayama 81'	Report	Uchida 83'; Omae 90+4'; Takagi 115'	Stadium: Shoda Shoyu Stadium Gunma; Attendance: 699; Referee: Yuichi Nishimura

7 July 2021 3	Oita Trinita	2–0	Fukui United FC	Fukui
19:00 JST	Watanabe 8'; Takazawa 29'	Report		Stadium: Technoport Fukui Stadium; Attendance: 1,421; Referee: Koichiro Fukushima

== Round of 16 ==
18 August 2021 4	Kawasaki Frontale	2–1	Shimizu S-Pulse	Shizuoka
19:00 JST	Kobayashi 57' (pen.); Leandro Damião 74'	Report	Nakayama 64'	Stadium: IAI Stadium Nihondaira; Attendance: 2,795; Referee: Masuya Ueda

18 August 2021 4	Verspah Oita	0–1 (a.e.t.)	Júbilo Iwata	Oita
19:00 JST		Report	González 101'	Stadium: Showa Denko Dome Oita; Attendance: 512; Referee: Yoshiaki Imai

18 August 2021 4	Cerezo Osaka	1–0	Sagan Tosu	Osaka
18:00 JST	Kato 34'	Report		Stadium: Yodoko Sakura Stadium; Attendance: 2,562; Referee: Akihiko Ikeuchi

18 August 2021 4	Kashima Antlers	3–1	V-Varen Nagasaki	Isahaya
19:00 JST	Arthur Caíke 50'; Everaldo 60'; Hayashi 74'	Report	Maikuma 7'	Stadium: Transcosmos Stadium Nagasaki; Attendance: 3,357; Referee: Yudai Yamamoto

22 September 2021 4	Gamba Osaka	4–1	Shonan Bellmare	Suita
18:00 JST	Patric 2', 56'; Wellington Silva 26'; Kurata 42'	Report	Shibata 64'	Stadium: Panasonic Stadium Suita; Attendance: 2,874; Referee: Koei Koya

18 August 2021 4	Kyoto Sanga FC	0–1	Urawa Red Diamonds	Kyoto
18:00 JST		Report	Iwanami 15'	Stadium: Takebishi Stadium Kyoto; Attendance: 3,416; Referee: Jumpei Iida

18 August 2021 4	Nagoya Grampus	1–0	Vissel Kobe	Toyota
18:00 JST	Świerczok 89'	Report		Stadium: Toyota Stadium; Attendance: 3,453; Referee: Hiroki Kasahara

18 August 2021 4	Thespakusatsu Gunma	1–2 (a.e.t.)	Oita Trinita	Maebashi
18:00 JST	Shiraishi 13'	Report	Watanabe 18'; Kobayashi 96'	Stadium: Shoda Shoyu Stadium Gunma; Attendance: 890; Referee: Futoshi Nakamura

== Quarter-finals ==
A draw was held on 24 September 2021 to determine the matchups of the quarter-final stage and onwards. Nagoya Grampus was guaranteed to have home advantage in quarter-finals as they advanced to the quarter-finals of the 2021 AFC Champions League, while Urawa Red Diamonds, Kashima Antlers and Oita Trinita were drawn as the away team in quarter-finals as they could not guarantee their home stadium at the moment.

27 October 2021 QF	Gamba Osaka	0–2	Urawa Red Diamonds	Suita
18:30 JST		Report	Junker 10'; Sekine 42'	Stadium: Panasonic Stadium Suita; Attendance: 5,553; Referee: Yuichi Nishimura

27 October 2021 QF	Nagoya Grampus	0–3	Cerezo Osaka	Toyota
18:00 JST		Report	Toriumi 32'; Tiago Pagnussat 38'; Taggart 62'	Stadium: Toyota Stadium; Attendance: 5,202; Referee: Hiroki Kasahara

27 October 2021 QF	Kawasaki Frontale	3–1	Kashima Antlers	Kawasaki
18:00 JST	Machida 32' (o.g.); Hatate 48'; Wakizaka 51'	Report	Araki 90'	Stadium: Todoroki Athletics Stadium; Attendance: 9,776; Referee: Nobutsugu Murakami

27 October 2021 QF	Júbilo Iwata	0–2	Oita Trinita	Fukuroi
19:00 JST		Report	Nagasawa 65'; Fujimoto 90+1'	Stadium: Shizuoka Stadium; Attendance: 3,418; Referee: Jumpei Iida

== Semi-finals ==
12 December 2021 SF	Urawa Red Diamonds	2–0	Cerezo Osaka	Saitama
16:00 JST	Ugajin 29'; Koizumi 89'	Report		Stadium: Saitama Stadium 2002; Attendance: 30,933; Referee: Yoshiro Imamura

12 December 2021 SF	Kawasaki Frontale	1–1 (a.e.t.) (4–5 p)	Oita Trinita	Kawasaki
14:00 JST	Kobayashi 113'	Report	Trevisan 120+1'	Stadium: Todoroki Athletics Stadium; Attendance: 17,595; Referee: Hajime Matsuo
	Penalties
	Chinen (penalty scored); Yamamura (penalty missed); Kozuka (penalty scored); Tsukagawa (penalty missed); Yu Kobayashi (penalty scored); Taniguchi (penalty scored); Yamane (penalty missed)		Shimoda (penalty scored); Nagasawa (penalty missed); Matsumoto (penalty scored); Trevisan (penalty scored); Yuk. Kobayashi (penalty missed); Misao (penalty scored); Machida (penalty scored)

== Final ==
19 December 2021 Final	Urawa Red Diamonds	2–1	Oita Trinita	Shinjuku
14:00 JST	Esaka 6'; Makino 90+3'	Report	Pereira 90'	Stadium: Japan National Stadium; Attendance: 57,785; Referee: Yusuke Araki

== See also ==
League

- 2021 J1 League
- 2021 J2 League
- 2021 J3 League
- 2021 Japan Football League

Cup(s)

- 2021 Fuji Xerox Super Cup
- 2021 J.League YBC Levain Cup
