= Oyama SC =

Japanese football club

Oyama SC 大山サッカークラブ
- Full name: Oyama Soccer Club
- Founded: 2012; 14 years ago
- Stadium: Komagihara Park Athletic Field
- Capacity: 7,000
- Chairman: Kanji Sato
- Manager: Hisashi Suzuki
- League: Tohoku Soccer League D2 South
- 2023: 4th of 10

Oyama Soccer Club (大山サッカークラブ, Ōyama Sakkākurabu) is a Japanese association football club based in Tsuruoka, Yamagata. They currently play in the Tohoku Soccer League 2nd division's southern block, in the sixth tier of Japanese football.

== History ==
Oyama SC was founded on 1959, centered around athletes from Oyama, located in Tsuruoka. After a while, the team became centered around alumni of Haguro High School's soccer club.

Ever since their foundation, they went back and forth between the 1st and 2nd divisions of Yamagata Prefectural League. A promotion for the Regional Leagues was only made possible in 2017, after they became prefectural champions for the first time.

As of 2025, the club is in its eighth straight season in the Tohoku Soccer League's 2nd Division South. In 2024, Oyama SC clinched the Yamagata Football Championship with a 5–3 victory over Yamagata University, earning the right to represent Yamagata in the 2024 Emperor's Cup for the third time.

In 2025, Oyama clinched the 2nd Division South title, earning a historic promotion to the Tohoku 1st Division for the very first time. They also secured the Yamagata Football Championship title by defeating FC Parafrente Yonezawa (ja) in the final by a score of 4-2. This marked their fourth victory in this tournament and earned them a spot in the first round of the 2025 Emperor's Cup.

== League and cup record ==
Champions	Runners-up	Third place	Promoted	Relegated

League													Emperor's Cup	Shakaijin Cup
Season	League	Tier	Teams	Pos.	P	W	D	L	F	A	GD	Pts	Emperor's Cup	Shakaijin Cup
2018	Tohoku Soccer League; D2 South	6	10	5th	18	8	2	8	60	59	1	18	Did not qualify	Did not qualify
2019	Tohoku Soccer League; D2 South	6	10	5th	18	8	3	7	42	50	-8	27	Did not qualify	Did not qualify
2020 †	Tohoku Soccer League; D2 South	6	10	3rd	9	6	1	2	28	15	13	19	1st round	Did not qualify
2021 †	Tohoku Soccer League; D2 South	6	12	4th	2	2	0	0	5	2	3	6	1st round	Did not qualify
2022 †	Tohoku Soccer League; D2 South	6	13	6th	12	6	1	5	39	16	23	19	Did not qualify	Did not qualify
2023	Tohoku Soccer League; D2 South	6	10	4th	13	5	3	5	26	21	5	18	Did not qualify	Did not qualify
2024	Tohoku Soccer League; D2 South	6	9	7th	16	5	4	7	31	20	11	19	1st round	Did not qualify
2025	Tohoku Soccer League; D2 South	6	8	1st	14	9	5	0	37	10	27	32	1st round	Did not qualify
2026	Tohoku Soccer League; D1	5	10	TBD									TBD	

Key

- Pos. = Position in league; P = Games played; W = Games won; D = Games drawn; L = Games lost; Pts= Points won
- † Number of games played reduced by COVID-19 worldwide pandemic

== Honours ==
Oyama SC honours
Honour	No.	Years
Yamagata Prefectural League 2nd Division	1	2016
Yamagata Prefectural League 1st Division	1	2017
Yamagata Prefecture Soccer Championship Emperor's Cup Yamagata Prefecture Qualifier	4	2020, 2021, 2024, 2025

== Emperor's Cup record ==
16 September 2020 2020 Emperor's Cup, 1st Round	Iwaki FC	4–0	Oyama SC	Hirono
15:00	Matsumoto 29'; Tanimura 60'; Takizawa 77'; Hiraoka 90'			Stadium: J-Village Stadium; Attendance: 0 Referee: Takeshi Tsukahara

23 May 2021 2021 Emperor's Cup, 1st Round	Iwate Grulla Morioka	13–0	Oyama SC	Morioka
13:00	Yomesaka 14'; Han Yong-thae 20'; Tabinas 34'; Otabor 36' 68'; Tabira 40'; Brenner 41' 84'; Takeda 59'; Yamakawa 70' 90+2'; Kurishima 85'; Shikama 90'	Match report		Stadium: Iwagin Stadium; Attendance: 220; Referee: Tomoyuki Umeda

26 May 2024 2024 Emperor's Cup, 1st Round	Fukushima United	9–0	Oyama SC	Hirono
13:00	Shimizu 11', 34', 83'; Kato 26'; Akiyama 39'; Yajima 42'; Awano 72'; Shiohama 84', 90+1'	Match report		Stadium: J-Village Stadium; Attendance: 280; Referee: Kentaro Kobayashi

24 May 2025 2025 Emperor's Cup, 1st Round	Tochigi SC	5–0	Oyama SC	Utsunomiya
13:00	Soki Hoshino 26', 43', 60'; Sun Igarashi 59'; Rita Mori 42'	Match report		Stadium: Tochigi Green Stadium; Attendance: 1,217; Referee: Kenshi Uda

== Current squad ==
Squad list for the 2023 season.

Note: Flags indicate national team as defined under FIFA eligibility rules; some limited exceptions apply. Players may hold more than one non-FIFA nationality.

No.	Pos.	Nation	Player
1	GK	JPN	Shinya Sato
2	DF	JPN	Mizuki Morita
3	DF	JPN	Yuki Nakamura
4	MF	JPN	Kosuke Kato
5	DF	JPN	Arata Sato
6	MF	JPN	Reo Honma
7	MF	JPN	Kaito Watanabe
8	MF	JPN	Taro Ikeda
9	FW	JPN	Hiro Sugawara
10	FW	JPN	Takahiro Sato
11	MF	JPN	Taku Umeki
12	DF	JPN	Naoto Ito
13	MF	JPN	Kazuki Abe
14	MF	JPN	Yusuke Nako
15	DF	JPN	Keito Hosaka
16	MF	JPN	Takuma Kambayashi
17	MF	JPN	Toya Honma
19	MF	JPN	Ko Honma

No.	Pos.	Nation	Player
20	MF	JPN	Takumi Kimura
21	FW	JPN	Yohei Ise
22	FW	JPN	Homare Yoshida
23	GK	JPN	Takumi Sato
24	DF	JPN	Shumpei Sato
25	DF	JPN	Ryota Sato
26	FW	JPN	Tomoaki Abe
27	FW	JPN	Kojun Ito
28	DF	JPN	Sora Saito
29	DF	JPN	Ryu Saito
30	FW	JPN	Hisato Saito
31	FW	JPN	Rinsei Sato
32	MF	JPN	Goki Ikeda
34	MF	JPN	Hirokazu Saito
35	FW	JPN	Ryotaro Yamashita
36	MF	JPN	Takumi Oi
37	GK	JPN	Yuzuru Suzuki
40	FW	JPN	Shigeki Abe
