= Hagino =

Hagino (written: 萩野) is a Japanese surname. Notable people with the surname include:

- Hideaki Hagino (萩野 英明, born 1973), Japanese footballer
- Kodai Hagino (萩野 滉大, born 2000), Japanese footballer
- Kosuke Hagino (萩野 公介, born 1994), Japanese swimmer
- Takashi Hagino (萩野 崇, born 1973), Japanese actor

== See also ==
- 12802 Hagino, a main-belt asteroid
- Hagino Station, a railway station in Shiraoi District, Hokkaidō, Japan
