= Todaka =

Todaka (written: 戸高) is a Japanese surname. Notable people with the surname include:

- Hideki Todaka (戸高 秀樹, born 1973), Japanese boxer
- Hiroki Todaka (戸高 弘貴, born 1991), Japanese footballer
- Kazumi Totaka (戸高 一生, born 1967), composer for Nintendo
