= 2020 J2 League =

Meiji Yasuda J2 League
- Season: 2020
- Dates: 20 February; 27 June – 20 December 2020
- Champions: Tokushima Vortis (1st title)
- Promoted: Tokushima Vortis; Avispa Fukuoka
- Relegated: none (for season 2020 only)
- Matches: 462
- Goals: 1,119 (2.42 per match)
- Top goalscorer: Peter Utaka (22 goals)
- Biggest home win: 6-0 F.C. Ryukyu v Ehime F.C. JEF United Chiba v Zweigen Kanazawa
- Biggest away win: 1-6 Matsumoto Yamaga v F.C. Ryukyu
- Highest scoring: 3-5 Albirex Niigata v Zweigen Kanazawa
- Longest winning run: 12 Avispa Fukuoka
- Longest unbeaten run: 15 Avispa Fukuoka
- Longest winless run: 11 Renofa Yamaguchi
- Longest losing run: 7 Renofa Yamaguchi
- Highest attendance: 14,526 Júbilo Iwata v Montedio Yamagata
- Lowest attendance: 0 due to Covid-19
- Total attendance: 1,269,962
- Average attendance: 2,754
- All statistics correct as of 20 December 2020.

The 2020 J2 League, also known as the 2020 Meiji Yasuda J2 League (Japanese: 2020 明治安田生命J2リーグ, Hepburn: 2020 Meiji Yasuda Seimei J2 Rīgu) for sponsorship reasons, was the 28th season of J2 League, the top Japanese professional league for association football clubs, since its establishment in 1993. The league started on 21 February 2020. For this season, the league was planned to have a season break to avoid a clash with 2020 Summer Olympics due to be starting from June to August, as the Olympics were postponed by a year.

== Effects of the 2019–20 coronavirus pandemic ==
On 25 February, all J.League matches until March 15 were postponed in response to the COVID-19 pandemic. After that, it was announced that it would be postponed until 29 March. On 19 March, the J.League announced no relegation would take place for the 2020 season, with the J1 League expanding to 20 clubs for the 2021 season. On 25 March, a further announcement declared that the league would be suspended from 3 April to 6 May.

On 3 April, a decision to start over the official game schedule, which aimed to gradually resume J3 from 25 April, J2 from 2 May, and J1 from 9 May. Note that, considering a new schedule in the future, but it would resume it at least one month later and later in the month.

On 29 May, the J.League announced a resumption of matches on 27 June. On 9 June, the league issued a further announcement about the schedule of the 2020 season. On 15 June, a new announcement about the New dates was published. The first 2 rounds of matches in each league (J2 2nd-3rd series) were held without spectators. After 10 July, as a rule, the maximum number of people was 5,000 (stadiums with lower capacity were those with less than 50% of the capacity of people, and forbade away supporters). After August, the maximum stadium capacity was 50%, and it would be a "high alert spectator match".

After the 11th J.League extraordinary executive committee on 20 July, it was announced that the "super strict alert audience game" would be extended to 10 August in view of the spread of coronavirus infection.

== Clubs ==
Locations of the 2020 J2 League teams

After spending only one season in J2, Kashiwa Reysol were crowned champions and were promoted to 2020 J1 League along with the runners-up Yokohama FC. The 2019 J3 League champions Giravanz Kitakyushu and runners-up Thespakusatsu Gunma entered the league as the promoted teams, replacing Kagoshima United and FC Gifu who were relegated to 2020 J3 League. Those teams that qualified for promotion playoffs in 2019 were unable to defeat their opponent and thus remained in the 2020 season.

Giravanz Kitakyushu returned to J2 after spending three seasons in J3, while Thespakusatsu Gunma return after spending two seasons.

Meanwhile, Matsumoto Yamaga and Júbilo Iwata joined the 2020 J2 League as relegated teams from 2019 J1 League having placed 17th and 18th respectively.

Club Name	Home Town	Stadium	Capacity	Last season	licence
Albirex Niigata	Niigata & Seiro, Niigata	Denka Big Swan Stadium	42,300	J2 (10th)	J1
Avispa Fukuoka	Fukuoka City, Fukuoka	Level5 Stadium	22,563	J2 (16th)	J1
Ehime FC	All cities/towns in Ehime (Note: centering on Matsuyama)	Ningineer Stadium	20,000	J2 (19th)	J1
Fagiano Okayama	All cities/towns in Okayama (Note: centering on Okayama, Kurashiki, Tsuyama)	City Light Stadium	20,000	J2 (9th)	J1
Giravanz Kitakyushu	Kitakyushu, Fukuoka	Mikuni World Stadium Kitakyushu	15,066	Promoted from J3 (champions)	J1
JEF United Chiba	Chiba & Ichihara, Chiba	Fukuda Denshi Arena	18,500	J2 (17th)	J1
Júbilo Iwata	Iwata, Shizuoka	Yamaha Stadium	15,165	Relegated from J1 (18th)	J1
Kyoto Sanga	Cities/towns in Kyoto (Note: Kyoto, Uji, Joyo, Kyotanabe, Muko, Nagaokakyo, Kizugawa, Kameoka, Nantan, Kyotanba, Fukuchiyama, Maizuru, Ayabe)	Sanga Stadium by Kyocera	21,600	J2 (8th)	J1
Machida Zelvia	Machida, Tokyo	Machida Athletic Stadium	10,600	J2 (18th)	J1
Matsumoto Yamaga	Cities/towns in Nagano (Note: Matsumoto, Azumino, Yamagata, Shiojiri, Omachi, Ikeda, Ikusaka, Minowa, Asahi)	Sunpro Alwin	20,396	Relegated from J1 (17th)	J1
Mito HollyHock	Cities/towns in Ibaraki (Note: Mito, Hitachinaka, Kasama, Naka, Omitama, Ibaraki, Shirosato, Oarai, Tokai)	K's denki Stadium Mito	12,000	J2 (7th)	J2
Montedio Yamagata	All cities/towns in Yamagata (Note: centering on Yamagata, Tendo, Tsuruoka)	ND Soft Stadium	20,315	J2 (6th)	J1
Omiya Ardija	Saitama, Saitama	NACK5 Stadium Omiya	15,500	J2 (3rd)	J1
Renofa Yamaguchi	All cities/towns in Yamaguchi	Yamaguchi Ishin Park Stadium	20,000	J2 (15th)	J1
FC Ryukyu	All cities/towns in Okinawa (Note: centering on Okinawa)	Tapic Kenso Hiyagon Stadium	25,000	J2 (14th)	J1
Tochigi SC	Utsunomiya, Tochigi	Tochigi Green Stadium	18,025	J2 (20th)	J1
Thespakusatsu Gunma	All cities/towns in Gunma (Note: centering on Kusatsu and Maebashi)	Shoda Shoyu Stadium Gunma	15,253	Promoted from J3 (2nd）	J1
Tokushima Vortis	All cities/towns in Tokushima (Note: centering on Tokushima, Naruto, Mima, Matsushige, Itano, Aizumi, Kitajima)	Pocarisweat Stadium	20,441	J2 (4th)	J1
V-Varen Nagasaki	All cities/towns in Nagasaki Prefecture (Note: centering on Nagasaki and Isahaya)	Nagasaki Athletic Stadium	20,246	J2 (12th)	J1
Ventforet Kofu	All cities/towns in Yamanashi Prefecture (Note: centering on Kofu and Nirasaki)	Yamanashi Chuo Bank Stadium	17,000	J2 (5th)	J1
Tokyo Verdy	All cities/towns in Tokyo	Ajinomoto Stadium	49,970	J2 (13th)	J1
Zweigen Kanazawa	All cities/towns in Ishikawa (Note: centering on Kanazawa, Nonoichi, Kahoku, Tsubata, Tsubata)	Ishikawa Kanazawa Stadium	20,000	J2 (11th)	J1

=== Personnel and kits ===
Club	Manager	Captain	Kit manufacturer
Albirex Niigata	(Spain) Albert Puig		(Germany) Adidas
Avispa Fukuoka	(Japan) Shigetoshi Hasebe		(Japan) YONEX
Ehime FC	(Japan) Kenta Kawai		(Japan) Mizuno
Fagiano Okayama	(Japan) Kenji Arima		(Brazil) Penalty
Giravanz Kitakyushu	(Japan) Shinji Kobayashi		(Brazil) Penalty
JEF United Chiba	(South Korea) Yoon Jong-hwan		(Italy) Kappa
Júbilo Iwata	(Spain) Fernando Jubero		(Germany) Puma
Kyoto Sanga	(Japan) Noritada Saneyoshi		(Germany) Puma
Machida Zelvia	(Austria) (Serbia) Ranko Popović		(Japan) SVOLME
Matsumoto Yamaga	(Japan) Keiichiro Nuno		(Germany) Adidas
Mito HollyHock	(Japan) Tadahiro Akiba		(Japan) GAViC
Montedio Yamagata	(Japan) Kiyotaka Ishimaru		(Brazil) Penalty
Omiya Ardija	(Japan) Takuya Takagi		(United States) Under Armour
Renofa Yamaguchi	(Japan) Masahiro Shimoda		(Brazil) Finta
FC Ryukyu	(Japan) Yasuhiro Higuchi		(Japan) sfida
Tochigi SC	(Japan) Kazuaki Tasaka		(Brazil) ATHLETA
Thespakusatsu Gunma	(Japan) Ryosuke Okuno		(Spain) Kelme
Tokushima Vortis	(Spain) Ricardo Rodríguez		(Japan) Mizuno
V-Varen Nagasaki	(Japan) Makoto Teguramori		(England) Umbro
Ventforet Kofu	(Japan) Akira Ito		(Japan) Mizuno
Tokyo Verdy	(Japan) Hideki Nagai		(Brazil) ATHLETA
Zweigen Kanazawa	(Japan) Masaaki Yanagishita		(Germany) Adidas

=== Managerial changes ===
Team	Outgoing manager	Manner of departure	Date of vacancy	Incoming manager	Date of appointment
Matsumoto Yamaga	(Japan) Keiichiro Nuno	Dismissal	25 September 2020	(Japan) Kei Shibata	25 September 2020
Júbilo Iwata	(Spain) Fernando Jubero	Dismissal	1 October 2020	(Japan) Masakazu Suzuki	2 October 2020

== Foreign players ==
As of 2020 season, there are no more restrictions on a number of signed foreign players, but clubs can only register up to five foreign players for a single match-day squad. Players from J.League partner nations (Thailand, Vietnam, Myanmar, Malaysia, Cambodia, Singapore, Indonesia and Qatar) are exempt from these restrictions.

- Players name in **bold** indicates the player is registered during the mid-season transfer window.

Club	Player 1	Player 2	Player 3	Player 4	Player 5	Player 6	Player 7	Former players
Montedio Yamagata	(Brazil) Vinícius Araújo	(South Korea) Min Seong-jun						
Mito HollyHock	(Brazil) Halef Pitbull							
Tochigi SC	(South Korea) Woo Sang-ho							(North Korea) Han Yong-thae
Thespakusatsu Gunma								
Omiya Ardija	(Bosnia and Herzegovina) Nermin Haskić	(Latvia) Vitālijs Maksimenko	(Serbia) Filip Kljajić	(Russia) Ippei Shinozuka	(Norway) **Ibba Laajab**			
JEF United Chiba	(Brazil) Alan Pinheiro	(Brazil) Kléber	(South Korea) Jang Min-gyu	(Australia) Jason Geria	(Brazil) Hebert			
Tokyo Verdy	(Brazil) Leandro	(Brazil) Klebinho	(Brazil) Matheus Vidotto					
Machida Zelvia	(Serbia) Alen Mašović	(North Korea) Ri Han-jae	(North Macedonia) Dorian Babunski	(South Korea) Jeong Chung-geun	(Serbia) Stefan Šćepović	(Peru) Erick Noriega		
Ventforet Kofu	(Brazil) Dudu		(Brazil) Rafael Marques					
Matsumoto Yamaga	(Brazil) Augusto César	(Brazil) Serginho	(Brazil) Alvaro	(Brazil) Jael	(North Korea) **Han Yong-thae**			
Albirex Niigata	(North Korea) Jong Tae-se	(Brazil) Silvinho	(Uruguay) Gonzalo González	(Uruguay) Pedro Manzi	(Argentina) Mauro dos Santos			(Brazil) Fábio
Zweigen Kanazawa	(Brazil) Rodolfo	(Brazil) Lucão						
Jubilo Iwata	(Brazil) Lulinha	(Brazil) Lukian	(Argentina) Juan Forlín	(Uzbekistan) Fozil Musaev				
Kyoto Sanga	(Brazil) Renan Mota	(Brazil) Juninho	(Netherlands) Jordy Buijs	(Nigeria) Peter Utaka				
Fagiano Okayama	(Brazil) Paulinho	(Brazil) Léo Mineiro	(South Korea) Lee Yong-jae	(South Korea) Yu Yong-hyeon	(South Korea) Lee Kyeong-tae	(South Korea) Choi Jung-won	(Malaysia) Hadi Fayyadh	
Renofa Yamaguchi	(Brazil) Renan	(Brazil) Henik	(Brazil) Iury	(Brazil) Sandro				
Tokushima Vortis	(Brazil) Diego	(Serbia) Dušan Cvetinović						
Ehime FC	(Spain) Sisi							
Avispa Fukuoka	(Brazil) Douglas Grolli	(Spain) Jon Ander Serantes	(Spain) Carlos Gutiérrez	(Spain) Juanma	(Sweden) Emil Salomonsson			
Giravanz Kitakyushu								
V-Varen Nagasaki	(Brazil) Caio César	(Brazil) Freire	(Brazil) Luan	(Colombia) Víctor Ibarbo	(Brazil) **Edigar Junio**			
FC Ryukyu	(Brazil) Felipe Tavares	(Costa Rica) Danny Carvajal	(South Korea) Lee Ji-seong	(North Korea) Ri Yong-jik	(Vietnam) Cao Văn Triền	(Vietnam) Trần Danh Trung		

== League table ==
It was decided on 19 March to change the format regarding the rules for promotion/relegation for the end of the season for the J1, J2 and J3 leagues, such that there would be no relegation this season, that two clubs from the J2 League would be promoted to the 2021 J1 League, and that two clubs from the J3 League would be promoted to the 2021 J2 League (subject to licensing regulations). It was also announced that the J1/J2 play-offs would not be held.

Pos	Team	Pld	W	D	L	GF	GA	GD	Pts	Promotion, qualification or relegation
1	Tokushima Vortis (C, P)	42	25	9	8	67	33	+34	84	Promotion to 2021 J1 League; 2020 Emperor's Cup quarter-finals
2	Avispa Fukuoka (P)	42	25	9	8	51	29	+22	84	Promotion to 2021 J1 League
3	V-Varen Nagasaki	42	23	11	8	66	39	+27	80	
4	Ventforet Kofu	42	16	17	9	50	41	+9	65	
5	Giravanz Kitakyushu	42	19	8	15	59	51	+8	65	
6	Júbilo Iwata	42	16	15	11	58	47	+11	63	
7	Montedio Yamagata	42	17	11	14	59	42	+17	62	
8	Kyoto Sanga	42	16	11	15	47	45	+2	59	
9	Mito HollyHock	42	16	10	16	68	62	+6	58	
10	Tochigi SC	42	15	13	14	41	39	+2	58	
11	Albirex Niigata	42	14	15	13	55	55	0	57	
12	Tokyo Verdy	42	13	15	14	48	48	0	54	
13	Matsumoto Yamaga	42	13	15	14	44	52	−8	54	
14	JEF United Chiba	42	15	8	19	47	51	−4	53	
15	Omiya Ardija	42	14	11	17	43	52	−9	53	
16	FC Ryukyu	42	14	8	20	58	61	−3	50	
17	Fagiano Okayama	42	12	14	16	39	49	−10	50	
18	Zweigen Kanazawa	42	12	13	17	57	67	−10	49	
19	Machida Zelvia	42	12	13	17	41	52	−11	49	
20	Thespakusatsu Gunma	42	15	4	23	40	62	−22	49	
21	Ehime FC	42	8	10	24	38	68	−30	34	
22	Renofa Yamaguchi	42	9	6	27	43	74	−31	33	

Source: Meiji Yasuda J2 League
Rules for classification: 1) Points; 2) Goal difference; 3) Head-to-head points; 4) Head-to-head goal difference; 5) Head-to-head goal scored; 6) Number of wins; 7) Goals scored; 8) Fair-play points
(C) Champions; (P) Promoted

== Positions by round ==
Team ╲ Round	1	2	3	4	5	6	7	8	9	10	11	12	13	14	15	16	17	18	19	20	21	22	23	24	25	26	27	28	29	30	31	32	33	34	35	36	37	38	39	40	41	42
Tokushima Vortis	2	8																	3														1									1
Avispa Fukuoka	9	6																	8														2									2
V-Varen Nagasaki	10	2																	2														3									3
Ventforet Kofu	12	15																	4														4									4
Albirex Niigata	1	3																	7														5									11
Giravanz Kitakyushu	18	20																	1														6									5
Montedio Yamagata	20	14																	16														7									7
Kyoto Sanga	17	10																	5														8									8
Júbilo Iwata	3	12																	6														9									6
Tochigi SC	15	21																	11														10									10
Tokyo Verdy	22	19																	9														11									12
Zweigen Kanazawa	16	18																	12														12									18
Fagiano Okayama	7	4																	17														13									17
Mito HollyHock	13	9																	14														14									9
Machida Zelvia	11	16																	10														15									19
JEF United Chiba	6	13																	15														16									14
Omiya Ardija	4	1																	13														17									15
FC Ryukyu	19	17																	19														18									16
Matsumoto Yamaga	5	7																	18														19									13
Thespakusatsu Gunma	21	22																	21														20									20
Ehime FC	14	11																	20														21									21
Renofa Yamaguchi	8	5																	22														22									22

Leader and qualification for 2021 J1 League
Runner-up and qualification for 2021 J1 League

Source: Meiji Yasuda J2 League

== Top scorers ==
Rank	Player	Club	Goals
1	(Nigeria) Peter Utaka	Kyoto Sanga	22
2	(Japan) Akira Silvano Disaro	Giravanz Kitakyushu	18
3	(Japan) Yuki Kakita	Tokushima Vortis	17
4	(Japan) Kazuma Yamaguchi	Mito HollyHock	15
5	(Brazil) Vinícius Araújo	Montedio Yamagata	14
6	(Japan) Masato Nakayama	Mito HollyHock	13
6	(Japan) Takuma Abe	FC Ryukyu	13
6	(Japan) Mutsuki Kato	Zweigen Kanazawa	13
9	(Japan) Kazuma Takai	Renofa Yamaguchi	11
9	(Japan) Daiya Tono	Avispa Fukuoka	11
11	(Brazil) Dudu	Ventforet Kofu	10
11	(Brazil) Lukian	Júbilo Iwata	10
11	(Brazil) Lucão	Zweigen Kanazawa	10
11	(Japan) Koya Kazama	FC Ryukyu	10

== Attendances ==
Pos	Team	Total	High	Low	Average	Change
1	Albirex Niigata	65,355	8,369	0	4,668	−68.5%
2	V-Varen Nagasaki	44,568	9,436	0	3,714	−52.0%
3	Jubilo Iwata	44,998	14,526	0	3,214	−79.0%^{†}
4	Giravanz Kitakyushu	41,283	13,574	0	3,176	−47.5%^{‡}
5	Matsumoto Yamaga	37,101	4,877	0	3,092	−82.2%^{†}
6	Kyoto Sanga	32,164	4,133	0	2,924	−62.8%
7	Fagiano Okayama	42,816	12,434	0	2,854	−69.8%
8	Montedio Yamagata	35,186	5,435	0	2,707	−67.3%
9	Tokushima Vortis	34,308	9,033	0	2,639	−54.0%
10	JEF United Chiba	33,936	9,701	0	2,610	−73.1%
11	Avispa Fukuoka	32,771	9,006	0	2,521	−63.9%
12	Renofa Yamaguchi	23,707	8,424	0	1,976	−64.9%
13	Mito HollyHock	25,670	7,029	0	1,975	−67.6%
14	Tokyo Verdy	23,512	4,161	0	1,959	−63.5%
15	Omiya Ardija	25,049	3,029	0	1,927	−79.7%
16	Ventforet Kofu	25,345	2,390	0	1,810	−78.1%
17	Thespakusatsu Gunma	22,216	11,038	0	1,709	−52.4%^{‡}
18	Tochigi SC	21,543	2,701	0	1,657	−67.8%
19	Ehime FC	22,084	5,681	0	1,577	−58.3%
20	Zweigen Kanazawa	19,625	2,764	0	1,510	−71.0%
21	Machida Zelvia	17,241	6,421	0	1,232	−73.9%
22	FC Ryukyu	7,625	1,464	0	635	−87.2%
	League total	678,103	14,526	0	2,371	−67.0%

Updated to games played on 14 October 2020
Source: J. League Data
Notes:
^{†} Last year in J1 League
^{‡} Last year in J3 League。

== See also ==
- Japan Football Association (JFA)
- J.League
- 2020 J1 League (I)
- 2020 J2 League (II)
- 2020 J3 League (III)
- 2020 Japan Football League (IV)
- 2020 Japanese Regional Leagues (V/VI)
- 2020 Fuji Xerox Super Cup (Super Cup)
- 2020 Emperor's Cup (National Cup)
- 2020 J.League YBC Levain Cup (League Cup)
