= Yuki Aida =

Japanese footballer

Personal information
- Full name: Yuki Aida
- Date of birth: 3 August 1998 (age 28)
- Place of birth: Tokyo, Japan
- Height: 1.72 m (5 ft 8 in)
- Position: Midfielder

Team information
- Current team: Júbilo Iwata
- Number: 48

Youth career
- –2013: Akiruno FC
- 2014–2016: Yamanashi Gakuin High School

College career
Years	Team	Apps	(Gls)
2017–2020	Sapporo University		

Senior career*
Years	Team	Apps	(Gls)
2021–2024	Vanraure Hachinohe	88	(8)
2024	Renofa Yamaguchi FC	31	(0)
2025–	Júbilo Iwata	9	(0)
- * Club domestic league appearances and goals as of 14 August 2026

Yuki Aida (相田 勇樹, Aida Yūki; born 3 August 1998) is a Japanese footballer currently playing as a midfielder for Júbilo Iwata.

== Early life ==
Yuki was born in Tokyo. He played for Akiruno FC, Yamanashi Gakuin University High School and Sapporo University in his youth.

== Career ==
Yuki made his debut for Vanraure against Gifu on 14 March 2021. He scored his first goal for the club on 20 March 2022, scoring against Kagoshima United FC in the 16th minute.

== Career statistics ==
=== Club ===
As of 22 June 2021.

Club	Season	League			National Cup		League Cup		Other		Total	
Club	Season	Division	Apps	Goals	Apps	Goals	Apps	Goals	Apps	Goals	Apps	Goals
Sapporo University	2020	–			1 (Note: Appearances in the Emperor's Cup)	0	–		0	0	1	0
Vanraure Hachinohe	2021	J3 League	7	0	2	4	–		0	0	9	4
Career total			7	0	3	4	0	0	0	0	10	4
