= Umeki =

Umeki (written: 梅木) is a Japanese surname. Notable people with the surname include:

- Kento Umeki (梅木 絢都, born 1999), Japanese footballer
- Mami Umeki (梅木 真美; born 1994), Japanese judoka
- Miyoshi Umeki (梅木 美代志; 1929–2007), Japanese-American singer and actress
- Tsubasa Umeki (梅木 翼, born 1998), Japanese footballer

== See also ==
- Umeki Webb (born 1975), American basketball player
