= Felipe Tavares =

Brazilian footballer (born 1994)

Personal information
- Full name: Felipe Pereira Tavares
- Date of birth: 24 February 1994 (age 32)
- Place of birth: São Paulo, Brazil
- Height: 1.82 m (6 ft 0 in)
- Position: Defender

Youth career
- –2014: Linense-SP

Senior career*
Years	Team	Apps	(Gls)
2013–2017	Linense-SP	1	(0)
2014	→ Duque de Caxias (loan)	7	(0)
2015	→ Santacruzense (loan)	0	(0)
2016	→ Rio Branco-SP (loan)	0	(0)
2017	→ Velo Clube-SP (loan)	0	(0)
2018	Anapolina	0	(0)
2018	Mirassol	1	(0)
2018	Olímpia	0	(0)
2019	Gama	0	(0)
2019	→ Anápolis (loan)	0	(0)
2020–2021	FC Ryukyu	4	(0)
2022	Capital CF	2	(0)
- * Club domestic league appearances and goals

Felipe Pereira Tavares (born 24 February 1994) is a Brazilian former footballer.

== Career statistics ==
=== Club ===
As of 28 February 2020.

Club	Season	League			State League		Cup		Other		Total	
Club	Season	Division	Apps	Goals	Apps	Goals	Apps	Goals	Apps	Goals	Apps	Goals
Linense-SP	2013	–			0	0	0	0	3 (Note: Appearances in the Copa Paulista)	0	3	0
Linense-SP	2014	–			0	0	0	0	0	0	0	0
Linense-SP	2015	–			0	0	0	0	17	2	17	2
Linense-SP	2016	Série D	1	0	0	0	0	0	0	0	1	0
Linense-SP	2017	–			0	0	0	0	13	2	13	2
Linense-SP	Total		1	0	0	0	0	0	33	4	34	4
Duque de Caxias (loan)	2014	Série C	7	0	0	0	0	0	5 (Note: Appearances in the Copa Rio)	0	12	0
Santacruzense (loan)	2015	–			16 (Note: Appearances in the Campeonato Paulista A3)	2	0	0	0	0	16	2
Rio Branco-SP (loan)	2016	–			8 (Note: Appearances in the Campeonato Paulista A2)	0	0	0	0	0	8	0
Velo Clube-SP (loan)	2017	–			9	1	0	0	0	0	9	1
Anapolina	2018	–			11 (Note: Appearances in the Campeonato Goiano)	0	0	0	0	0	11	0
Mirassol	2018	Série D	1	0	0	0	0	0	0	0	1	0
Olímpia	2018	–			0	0	0	0	17	0	17	0
Gama	2019	–			9 (Note: Appearances in the Campeonato Brasiliense)	1	0	0	0	0	9	1
Anápolis (loan)	2019	–			3 (Note: Appearances in the Campeonato Goiano A2)	0	0	0	0	0	3	0
FC Ryukyu	2020	J2 League	1	0	–		0	0	0	0	1	0
Career total			10	0	56	4	0	0	55	4	121	8
