= Teppei Chikaishi =

Japanese footballer

Personal information
- Date of birth: 31 January 1989 (age 37)
- Place of birth: Osaka, Japan
- Height: 1.80 m (5 ft 11 in)
- Position: Defender

Team information
- Current team: Vanraure Hachinohe
- Number: 39

Youth career
- 2004–2006: Kindai University High School

College career
Years	Team	Apps	(Gls)
2007–2010	Kindai University		

Senior career*
Years	Team	Apps	(Gls)
2011–2012	Sagawa Shiga	15	(1)
2013	Ococias Kyoto	11	(2)
2014–2015	Ganju Iwate	34	(7)
2016–2017	ReinMeer Aomori	58	(4)
2018	Nara Club	8	(0)
2018–	Vanraure Hachinohe	161	(8)
- * Club domestic league appearances and goals as of 1 January 2026

Teppei Chikaishi (近石 哲平, Chikaishi Teppei; born 31 January 1989) is a Japanese footballer currently playing as a defender for Vanraure Hachinohe.

== Career statistics ==
=== Club ===
As of 23 July 2021.

Club	Season	League			National Cup		League Cup		Other		Total	
Club	Season	Division	Apps	Goals	Apps	Goals	Apps	Goals	Apps	Goals	Apps	Goals
Sagawa Shiga	2011	JFL	15	1	1 (Note: Appearances in the Emperor's Cup)	0	–		0	0	16	1
Sagawa Shiga	2012	JFL	0	0	0	0	–		0	0	0	0
Sagawa Shiga	Total		15	1	1	0	0	0	0	0	16	1
Ococias Kyoto	2013	Kansai Soccer League	11	2	0	0	–		0	0	11	2
Ganju Iwate	2014	Tohoku Soccer League	17	3	0	0	–		0	0	17	3
Ganju Iwate	2015	Tohoku Soccer League	17	4	0	0	–		0	0	17	4
Ganju Iwate	Total		34	7	0	0	0	0	0	0	34	7
ReinMeer Aomori	2016	JFL	28	1	0	0	–		0	0	28	1
ReinMeer Aomori	2017	JFL	30	3	0	0	–		0	0	30	3
ReinMeer Aomori	Total		58	4	0	0	0	0	0	0	58	4
Nara Club	2018	JFL	8	0	0	0	–		0	0	8	0
Vanraure Hachinohe	2018	JFL	13	0	0	0	–		0	0	13	0
Vanraure Hachinohe	2019	J3 League	31	3	3	0	0	0	0	0	34	3
Vanraure Hachinohe	2020	J3 League	12	0	0	0	0	0	0	0	12	0
Vanraure Hachinohe	2021	J3 League	12	1	2	0	0	0	0	0	14	1
Vanraure Hachinohe	Total		68	4	5	0	0	0	0	0	73	4
Career total			194	18	6	0	0	0	0	0	200	18
