= Kazuma Tsuboi =

Japanese footballer

Kazuma Tsuboi 坪井 一真
Personal information
- Date of birth: 9 December 1998 (age 27)
- Place of birth: Osaka, Japan
- Height: 1.70 m (5 ft 7 in)
- Position: Midfielder

Team information
- Current team: Tiamo Hirakata

Youth career
- –2016: Cerezo Osaka
- 2017–2020: Kindai University

Senior career*
Years	Team	Apps	(Gls)
2021–2022	Vanraure Hachinohe	23	(0)
2023–	Tiamo Hirakata	0	(0)
- * Club domestic league appearances and goals as of 18:04, 20 November 2022 (UTC)

Kazuma Tsuboi (坪井 一真, Tsuboi Kazuma; born 9 December 1998) is a Japanese footballer currently playing as a midfielder for Tiamo Hirakata from 2023.

== Career ==
=== Youth career ===
Until 2016, he begin youth career with Cerezo Osaka.

In 2017, he moved to Kindai University until 2020 officially graduated.

=== Senior career ===
In 2021, Tsuboi begin first professional career and joined to J3 club, Vanraure Hachinohe.

In 2022, Tsuboi joined to JFL club, Tiamo Hirakata for upcoming 2023 season.

== Career statistics ==
=== Club ===
As of the end 2022 season.

Club	Season	League			National Cup		League Cup		Other		Total	
Club	Season	Division	Apps	Goals	Apps	Goals	Apps	Goals	Apps	Goals	Apps	Goals
Vanraure Hachinohe	2021	J3 League	17	0	3	2	–		0	0	20	2
Vanraure Hachinohe	2022	J3 League	6	0	0	0	–		0	0	6	0
Tiamo Hirakata	2023	JFL	0	0	0	0	–		0	0	0	0
Career total			23	0	3	2	0	0	0	0	26	2
