= Seigo Takei =

Japanese footballer

Personal information
- Date of birth: 15 April 1998 (age 28)
- Place of birth: Saitama, Japan
- Height: 1.81 m (5 ft 11 in)
- Position: Forward

Team information
- Current team: Ventforet Kofu
- Number: 27

Youth career
- 2014–2016: Tokai Univ. Takanawadai High School

College career
Years	Team	Apps	(Gls)
2017–2020	Tokai University		

Senior career*
Years	Team	Apps	(Gls)
2021–2024	FC Imabari	52	(4)
2024-2025	FC Osaka	64	(2)
2026-	Ventforet Kofu	22	(1)
- * Club domestic league appearances and goals as of 17 August 2026

Seigo Takei (武井 成豪, Takei Seigo; born 15 April 1998) is a Japanese footballer currently playing as a forward for Ventforet Kofu.

== Career statistics ==
=== Club ===
As of 20 March 2021.

Club	Season	League			National Cup		League Cup		Other		Total	
Club	Season	Division	Apps	Goals	Apps	Goals	Apps	Goals	Apps	Goals	Apps	Goals
FC Imabari	2021	J3 League	2	0	0	0	–		0	0	2	0
Career total			2	0	0	0	0	0	0	0	2	0
