= Kai Ishitsu =

Japanese footballer

Personal information
- Date of birth: 13 May 2002 (age 24)
- Place of birth: Ibaraki, Japan
- Height: 1.65 m (5 ft 5 in)
- Position: Midfielder

Team information
- Current team: R. Velho Takamatsu

Youth career
- 2015–2020: Kashima Antlers

Senior career*
Years	Team	Apps	(Gls)
2021–2024	Kagoshima United	0	(0)
2021	→ Ococias Kyoto (loan)	2	(0)
2023	→ FC Tokushima (loan)	7	(0)
2024–	R. Velho Takamatsu	13	(2)
- * Club domestic league appearances and goals as of 17:04, 9 June 2021 (UTC)

Kai Ishitsu (石津快, Ishitsu Kai; born 13 May 2002) is a Japanese footballer currently playing as a midfielder for R. Velho Takamatsu.

== Club career ==
Ishitsu made his professional debut in a 0–6 Emperor's Cup loss against Avispa Fukuoka.

== Career statistics ==
=== Club ===
As of 9 June 2021.

Club	Season	League			National Cup		League Cup		Other		Total	
Club	Season	Division	Apps	Goals	Apps	Goals	Apps	Goals	Apps	Goals	Apps	Goals
Kagoshima United	2021	J3 League	0	0	1 (Note: Appearances in the Emperor's Cup)	0	–		0	0	1	0
Career total			0	0	1	0	0	0	0	0	1	0
