= Kairi Harayama =

Japanese footballer

Personal information
- Date of birth: 1 November 1997 (age 29)
- Place of birth: Saitama, Japan
- Height: 1.74 m (5 ft 9 in)
- Position: Defender

Team information
- Current team: Vanraure Hachinohe
- Number: 24

Youth career
- Kumagaya SC
- 2013–2015: Aomori Yamada HS
- 2016–2019: Tokyo Gakugei University

Senior career*
Years	Team	Apps	(Gls)
2020	Iwate Grulla Morioka	0	(0)
2021–	Vanraure Hachinohe	4	(0)
- * Club domestic league appearances and goals as of 17:04, 13 July 2021 (UTC)

Kairi Harayama (原山 海里, Harayama Kairi; born 1 November 1997) is a Japanese footballer currently playing as a midfielder for Vanraure Hachinohe.

== Career statistics ==
=== Club ===
As of 13 July 2021.

Club	Season	League			National Cup		League Cup		Other		Total	
Club	Season	Division	Apps	Goals	Apps	Goals	Apps	Goals	Apps	Goals	Apps	Goals
Iwate Grulla Morioka	2020	J3 League	0	0	0	0	–		0	0	0	0
Vanraure Hachinohe	2021	J3 League	4	0	3 (Note: Appearances in the Emperor's Cup)	1	–		0	0	7	1
Career total			4	0	3	1	0	0	0	0	7	1
