= Rodrigo Angelotti =

Brazilian footballer

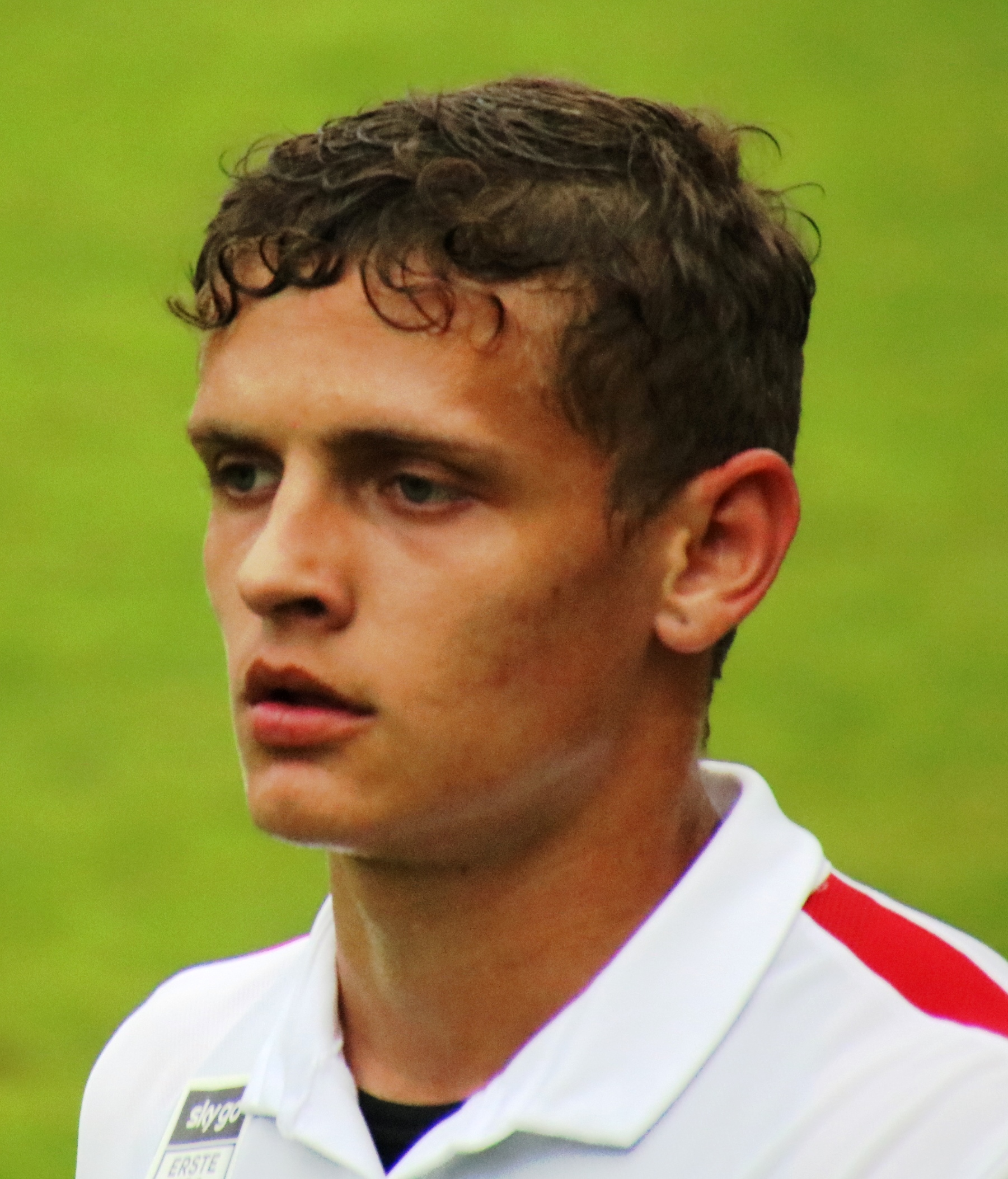
- Rodrigo with Liefering in 2017

Personal information
- Full name: Rodrigo Luiz Angelotti
- Date of birth: 27 April 1998 (age 28)
- Place of birth: Brazil
- Height: 1.81 m (5 ft 11 in)
- Positions: Forward; midfielder

Team information
- Current team: Seongnam FC
- Number: 9

Youth career
- Red Bull Brasil

Senior career*
Years	Team	Apps	(Gls)
2017–2019	Red Bull Brasil	15	(2)
2017–2018	→ FC Liefering (loan)	19	(2)
2019–2020	Bragantino	1	(0)
2019	→ Ituano (loan)	11	(2)
2021–	Kashiwa Reysol	29	(4)
2023	→ Omiya Ardija (loan)	34	(5)
2024	FC Imabari	17	(0)
2025	Kagoshima United	36	(7)
2026–	Seongnam FC	20	(4)
- * Club domestic league appearances and goals as of 6 August 2026

Rodrigo Luiz Angelotti (born 27 April 1998), sometimes known as just Angelotti, is a Brazilian professional footballer who plays as a midfielder and forward. He currently play for Seongnam FC.

== Club career ==
Rodrigo begin first youth career with Red Bull Brasil until 2016.

He made his first professional career with Red Bull Brasil and debut for Campeonato Paulista on 5 February 2017 in a game against Mirassol.

In July 2017, after a trial period with Red Bull Salzburg, he joined another Austrian club FC Liefering for a season-long loan.

Rodrigo became a Red Bull Bragantino player when Red Bull Brasil merged with Clube Atlético Bragantino in April 2019.

On 15 January 2021, Angelotti abroad to Japan and signed transfer to J1 club, Kashiwa Reysol for ahead of 2021 season. The jersey number is 29. On 24 April of the same year, he made his first appearance in the J. League in his J1 Matchweek 11 against Tokushima Vortis. Also, on 5 May, he scored his first goal after coming to Japan in the 5th round of the YBC Levain Cup Group Stage against Urawa Reds.

On 8 January 2023, Angelotti was loaned to J2 club, Omiya Ardija for ahead of 2023 season.

On 19 January 2024, Angelotti joined to J3 club, FC Imabari as a permanent transfer. On 29 November of the same year, he announced that would not sign a contract with Imabari.

On 27 December 2024, Angelotti joined to relegated J3 club, Kagoshima United on a permanent transfer from 2025 season.

On 13 January 2026, Angelotti signed to K League 2 club, Seongnam FC for 2026 season.
