= Nobuyuki Uenoyama =

Japanese footballer and manager

Personal information
- Date of birth: 26 May 1957 (age 69)
- Place of birth: Osaka, Japan
- Height: 1.81 m (5 ft 11 in)
- Position: Defender

Youth career
- 1973–1975: Settsu HS

Senior career*
Years	Team	Apps	(Gls)
1977–1985	Yanmar Diesel		

Managerial career
- 2021: Kamatamare Sanuki
- * Club domestic league appearances and goals

Nobuyuki Uenoyama (上野山 信行, Uenoyama Nobuyuki; born 26 May 1957) is a Japanese former footballer and manager. He managed Kamatamare Sanuki at the start of the 2021 season before resigning just two months into the season. His son, Jin Uenoyama, played for FC Osaka before retiring at the end of 2020.

== Managerial statistics ==
As of March 2021

Managerial record by team and tenure
Team	From	To	Record				
Team	From	To	P	W	D	L	Win %
Kamatamare Sanuki	2021	2021	2	0	0	2	0.0
Total			2	0	0	2	0.0
