= Masaru Hidaka =

Japanese footballer (born 1995)

Masaru Hidaka 日高 大
Personal information
- Date of birth: 14 March 1995 (age 31)
- Place of birth: Hiroshima Prefecture, Japan
- Height: 1.68 m (5 ft 6 in)
- Position: Midfielder

Team information
- Current team: JEF United Chiba
- Number: 67

Youth career
- Hesaka FC
- –2009: Hiroshima Taiga FC
- 2010–2012: Hiroshima Kanon High School

College career
Years	Team	Apps	(Gls)
2013–2017	Ryutsu Keizai University		

Senior career*
Years	Team	Apps	(Gls)
2017–2018	Honda FC	43	(5)
2019–2022	Iwaki FC	89	(15)
2023–	JEF United Chiba	103	(8)
- * Club domestic league appearances and goals as of 12 August 2026

Masaru Hidaka (日高 大, Hidaka Masaru; born 14 March 1995) is a Japanese professional footballer who plays as a midfielder for J1 League club JEF United Chiba.

== Youth career ==
Hidaka played for his high school between 2010 and 2012, before going on to play for Ryutsu Keizai University FC. In 2015 and 2016, Hidaka played 24 times in the Japan Football League for the university affiliate side Ryutsu Keizai Dragons Ryugasaki and scored his first goal for them in a 2–1 win over Sony Sendai FC. In 2016, he also made 10 appearances, scoring 4 goals for Ryutsu Keizai University in the JUFA Kanto League 1.

== Club career ==
In 2017, Hidaka signed for JFL club Honda FC. He made his debut for Honda in a 3–1 win over ReinMeer Aomori in March 2017 and scored his first goal for the club two months later in a 6–1 win over MIO Biwako Shiga. He also made his debut in the Emperor's Cup. Honda went on to be crowned JFL champions, with Hidaka making 22 league appearances, scoring 3 goals. Honda FC went on to win back-to-back league titles, with another league win coming in the 2018 season. Hidaka played 21 games in this season, scoring 2 goals and his performances earned him a place in the JFL Best XI for the season.

In December 2018, it was announced that Hidaka would be transferring to a lower division to play for Iwaki FC in the Tohoku Soccer League. Hidaka scored 6 goals across all competitions in his debut season, helping Iwaki to finish top of their regional division and go on to win promotion to the Japan Football League for the first time in their history following their victory in the Japanese Regional Football Champions League. Playing most of his career to date as a left-back, in the 2020 season Hidaka moved into a more advanced left-sided midfield position. Iwaki finished 7th in their first season in the JFL, but Hidaka managed to make the end of season Best XI for the second time in his career after scoring 4 goals in 15 games.

In only the club's second season participating in the JFL in the 2021 season, Iwaki FC gained promotion to the J3 League. Hidaka made 27 league appearances and was also inducted into the 2021 JFL Best XI for the third time.

In the 2022 season, Hidaka made his J.League debut in a 1–1 draw with Kagoshima United. Another excellent season ensued for him as he helped Iwaki to back-to-back promotions, playing in 32 out of a possible 34 league games and scoring 5 goals. For the second season running, Hidaka was inducted into the league's Best XI.

On 26 November 2022, it was announced that Hidaka would be joining JEF United Chiba for the 2023 season.

== Career statistics ==
=== Club ===
As of 5 March 2026.

Appearances and goals by club, season and competition
Club	Season	League			Emperor's Cup		Other		Total	
Club	Season	Division	Apps	Goals	Apps	Goals	Apps	Goals	Apps	Goals
RKU Dragons Ryugasaki	2015	JFL	10	0	0	0	–		10	0
RKU Dragons Ryugasaki	2016	JFL	14	4	0	0	–		14	4
RKU Dragons Ryugasaki	Total		24	4	0	0	0	0	24	4
Honda FC	2017	JFL	22	3	2	0	–		24	3
Honda FC	2018	JFL	21	2	0	0	–		21	2
Honda FC	Total		43	5	2	0	0	0	45	5
Iwaki FC	2019	Tohoku Soccer League	15	5	1	0	11 (Note: 5 appearances in the All Japan Senior Football Championship) (Note: 6 appearances, 1 goal in the Japanese Regional Football Champions League)	1	27	6
Iwaki FC	2020	JFL	15	4	1	0	–		16	4
Iwaki FC	2021	JFL	27	1	1	1	–		28	2
Iwaki FC	2022	J3 League	32	5	0	0	–		32	5
Iwaki FC	Total		89	15	3	1	11	1	103	17
JEF United Chiba	2023	J2 League	37	4	0	0	1 (Note: Appearances in the J1/J2 play-offs)	0	38	4
JEF United Chiba	2024	J2 League	22	1	1	0	0	0	23	1
JEF United Chiba	2024	J2 League	29	1	1	0	2	0	32	1
JEF United Chiba	2026	J1 (100)	3	0	–		–		3	0
JEF United Chiba	Total		91	6	2	0	3	0	96	6
Career total			247	30	7	1	14	1	268	32

== Honours ==
=== Club ===
Honda FC

- Japan Football League : 2017, 2018

Iwaki FC

- Tohoku Soccer League : 2019
- Japanese Regional Football Champions League : 2019
- Japan Football League : 2021
- J3 League : 2022

=== Individual ===
- JFL Best XI: 2018, 2020, 2021
- J3 League Best XI: 2022
