= Hiroki Todaka =

Japanese footballer

Hiroki Todaka 戸高 弘貴
Personal information
- Full name: Hiroki Todaka
- Date of birth: 18 November 1991 (age 34)
- Place of birth: Saiki, Ōita, Japan
- Height: 1.61 m (5 ft 3 in)
- Position: Midfielder

Youth career
- 2010–2013: Ritsumeikan University

Senior career*
Years	Team	Apps	(Gls)
2014–2019	Machida Zelvia	90	(15)
2020–2021	Kataller Toyama	30	(2)
2022	Okinawa SV	14	(5)
- * Club domestic league appearances and goals as of 27 November 2022, 20:20 (UTC)

Hiroki Todaka (戸高 弘貴, Todaka Hiroki; born 18 November 1991 in Saiki, Ōita) is a Japanese former footballer who played Midfielder.

== Career ==
Todaka announced his official retirement from football after eight years as a professional on 26 December 2022.

== Career statistics ==
Updated to the end 2022 season.

Appearances and goals by club, season and competition
Club	Season	League			Emperor's Cup		Total	
Club	Season	Division	Apps	Goals	Apps	Goals	Apps	Goals
Machida Zelvia	2014	J3 League	27	5	–		27	5
Machida Zelvia	2015	J3 League	0	0	0	0	0	0
Machida Zelvia	2016	J2 League	0	0	0	0	0	0
Machida Zelvia	2017	J2 League	26	6	1	1	27	7
Machida Zelvia	2018	J2 League	9	2	1	1	10	3
Machida Zelvia	2019	J2 League	28	2	1	0	29	2
Kataller Toyama	2020	J3 League	25	2	–		25	2
Kataller Toyama	2021	J3 League	5	0	1	1	6	1
Okinawa SV	2022	Japanese Regional Leagues	14	5	2	0	16	5
Career total			134	22	6	3	140	25
