= Kentaro Kai =

Japanese footballer

Kentaro Kai 甲斐 健太郎
Personal information
- Full name: Kentaro Kai
- Date of birth: 1 November 1994 (age 32)
- Place of birth: Osaka, Japan
- Height: 1.81 m (5 ft 11 in)
- Position: Defender

Team information
- Current team: FC Gifu
- Number: 4

Youth career
- 2010–2012: Rissho Univ. Shonan High School

College career
Years	Team	Apps	(Gls)
2013–2016	Hannan University		

Senior career*
Years	Team	Apps	(Gls)
2016–2021	FC Gifu	95	(3)
2018	→ Gainare Tottori (loan)	32	(1)
2022–2023	Iwate Grulla Morioka	68	(4)
2024–	FC Gifu	76	(3)
- * Club domestic league appearances and goals as of 17 August 2026

Kentaro Kai (甲斐 健太郎, Kai Kentarō; born 1 November 1994) is a Japanese football player who plays for J3 League club FC Gifu.

== Career ==
Kentaro Kai joined J2 League club FC Gifu in 2016.
