= Hagino Station =

Railway station in Shiraoi, Hokkaido, Japan

Coordinates: 42.5211°N 141.3060°E

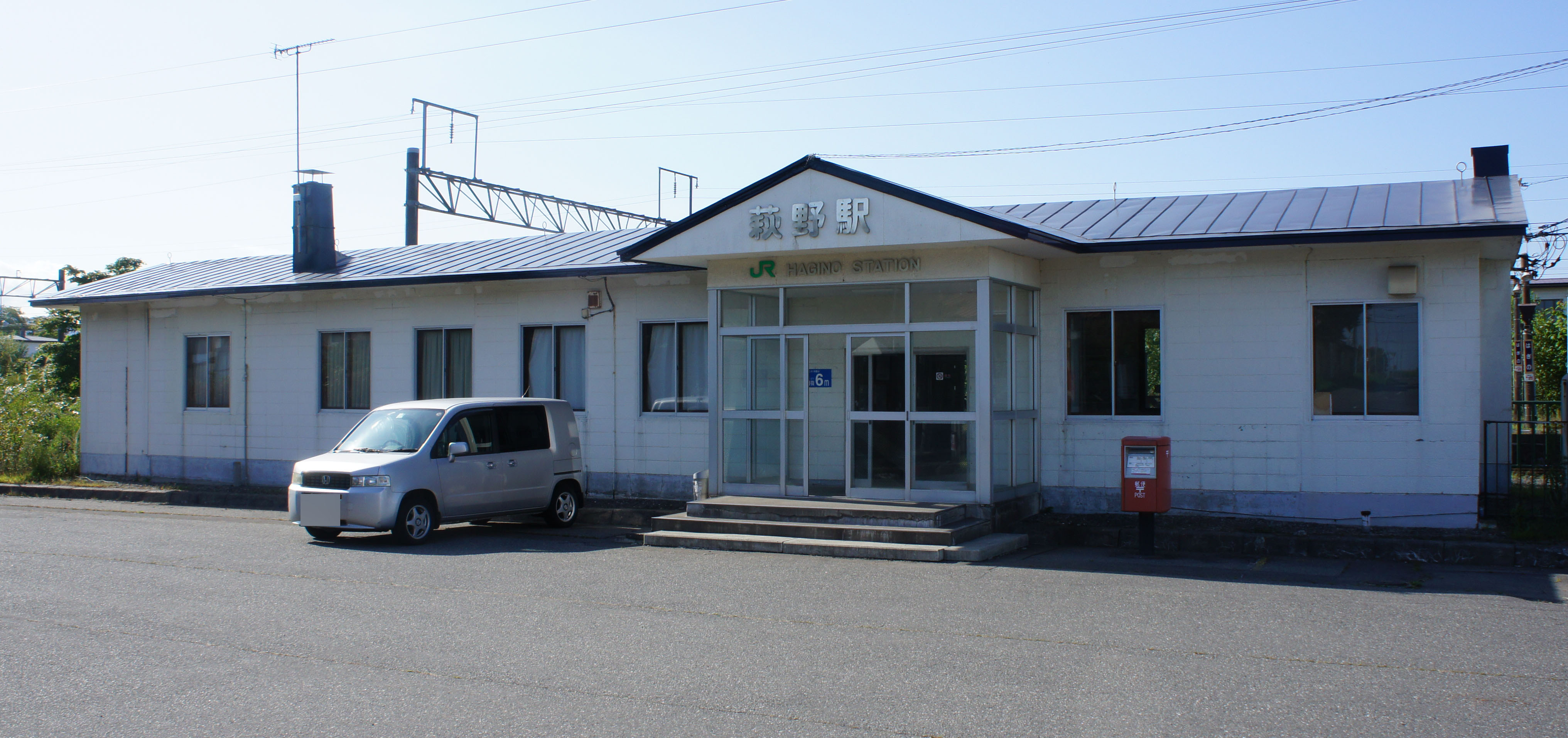
Station building

Hagino Station (萩野駅, Hagino-eki) is a train station in Shiraoi, Shiraoi District, Hokkaidō, Japan.

== Lines ==
- Hokkaido Railway Company
  - Muroran Main Line Station H24

== Adjacent stations ==
«	Service	»
Muroran Main Line
Kita-Yoshihara	-	Shiraoi
