= Kodai Hagino =

Japanese footballer

Kodai Hagino 萩野 滉大
Personal information
- Full name: Kodai Hagino
- Date of birth: June 20, 2000 (age 26)
- Place of birth: Aichi, Japan
- Height: 1.75 m (5 ft 9 in)
- Position: Midfielder

Team information
- Current team: FC Gifu
- Number: 3

Youth career
- –2018: Nagoya Grampus

Senior career*
Years	Team	Apps	(Gls)
2018	Nagoya Grampus	0	(0)
2023–	FC Gifu	61	(1)
- * Club domestic league appearances and goals as of 17 August 2026

Kodai Hagino (萩野 滉大, Hagino Kōdai; born June 20, 2000) is a Japanese football player for FC Gifu.

== Playing career ==
Hagino was born in Aichi Prefecture on June 20, 2000. He joined J1 League club Nagoya Grampus from youth team in 2018.
