= Yuki Shikama =

Japanese footballer

Yuki Shikama 色摩雄貴
Personal information
- Full name: Yuki Shikama
- Date of birth: 1 October 1997 (age 29)
- Place of birth: Chiba, Japan
- Height: 1.65 m (5 ft 5 in)
- Position: Forward

Youth career
- 2013–2015: Kashima Antlers Youth
- 2016–2019: Tokyo Gakugei University

Senior career*
Years	Team	Apps	(Gls)
2020–2022	Iwate Grulla Morioka	58	(8)
- * Club domestic league appearances and goals as of January 1, 2023

Yuki Shikama (色摩 雄貴, Shikama Yuki; born 1 October 1997) is a Japanese footballer currently playing as a forward.

== Career statistics ==
=== Club ===
Updated to January 1, 2022.

Club	Season	League			National Cup		League Cup		Other		Total	
Club	Season	Division	Apps	Goals	Apps	Goals	Apps	Goals	Apps	Goals	Apps	Goals
Iwate Grulla Morioka	2020	J3 League	16	1	0	0	–		0	0	16	1
Iwate Grulla Morioka	2021	J3 League	26	6	3 (Note: Appearances in the Emperor's Cup)	1	–		0	0	29	7
Career total			42	7	3	1	0	0	0	0	45	8
