= Tomoya Nakanishi =

Japanese footballer

Personal information
- Full name: Tomoya Nakanishi
- Date of birth: 12 April 1992 (age 34)
- Place of birth: Wakayama, Japan
- Height: 1.82 m (6 ft 0 in)
- Position: Forward

Team information
- Current team: Verspah Oita
- Number: 11

Youth career
- 2011–2014: St.Andrew’s University

Senior career*
Years	Team	Apps	(Gls)
2015–2017	Kataller Toyama	50	(7)
2017–2019	Verspah Oita	34	(4)
2020–	Arterivo Wakayama		
- * Club domestic league appearances and goals as of 1 March 2020

Tomoya Nakanishi (中西倫也, Nakanishi Tomoya; born 12 April 1992) is a Japanese footballer who has played for Verspah Oita, in the Japan Football League.

== Club statistics ==
Updated to 23 February 2017.

Club performance			League		Cup		Total	
Season	Club	League	Apps	Goals	Apps	Goals	Apps	Goals
Japan			League		Emperor's Cup		Total	
2015	Kataller Toyama	J3 League	26	6	–		26	6
2016	Kataller Toyama	J3 League	24	1	1	0	25	1
Career total			50	7	1	0	51	7
