= Kenneth Otabor =

Nigerian association football player

Personal information
- Date of birth: 13 May 2002 (age 24)
- Place of birth: Kaduna, Nigeria
- Height: 1.78 m (5 ft 10 in)
- Position: Midfielder

Team information
- Current team: Tochigi SC
- Number: 80

Youth career
- Sports Dreams FC
- 2018–2020: Kochi Chuo High School

Senior career*
| Years | Team | Apps | (Gls) |
| 2021–2025 | Iwate Grulla Morioka | 88 | (12) |
| 2025– | Tochigi SC | 25 | (2) |
- * Club domestic league appearances and goals as of 17 August 2026

Kenneth Otabor (born 13 May 2002) is a Nigerian professional footballer who plays as a midfielder for Tochigi SC.

== Career statistics ==
=== Club ===
As of 11 April 2021.

| Club | Season | League | | | National Cup | | League Cup | | Other | | Total | |
| Club | Season | Division | Apps | Goals | Apps | Goals | Apps | Goals | Apps | Goals | Apps | Goals |
|---|---|---|---|---|---|---|---|---|---|---|---|---|
| Iwate Grulla Morioka | 2021 | J3 League | 1 | 0 | 1 (Note: Appearances in the Emperor's Cup) | 2 | – | | 0 | 0 | 2 | 2 |
| Career total | | | 1 | 0 | 1 | 2 | 0 | 0 | 0 | 0 | 2 | 2 |
