= Hiroki Maeda (footballer, born 1994) =

Japanese footballer

Hiroki Maeda 前田 央樹
Personal information
- Full name: Hiroki Maeda
- Date of birth: April 9, 1994 (age 32)
- Place of birth: Fukuoka, Japan
- Height: 1.78 m (5 ft 10 in)
- Position: Forward

Team information
- Current team: Verspah Oita
- Number: 33

Youth career
- 2007–2013: Avispa Fukuoka Youth
- 2013–2016: Hannan University

Senior career*
Years	Team	Apps	(Gls)
2017	FC Ryukyu	26	(3)
2018	Giravanz Kitakyushu	23	(2)
2019–	Verspah Oita	22	(7)
- * Club domestic league appearances and goals as of 23 February 2020

Hiroki Maeda (前田 央樹, Maeda Hiroki; born April 9, 1994) is a Japanese football player for Verspah Oita.

== Club statistics ==
Updated to 23 February 2020.

Club performance			League		Cup		Total	
Season	Club	League	Apps	Goals	Apps	Goals	Apps	Goals
Japan			League		Emperor's Cup		Total	
2017	FC Ryukyu	J3 League	26	3	1	1	27	4
2018	Giravanz Kitakyushu	J3 League	23	2	–		23	2
2019	Verspah Oita	JFL	22	7	0	0	22	7
Total			71	12	1	1	72	13
