= Tsubasa Umeki =

Japanese footballer

Personal information
- Date of birth: 24 November 1998 (age 27)
- Place of birth: Shimane, Japan
- Height: 1.83 m (6 ft 0 in)
- Position: Forward

Team information
- Current team: Vegalta Sendai
- Number: 18

Youth career
- –2010: Izumo Minami FC
- 2011–2013: Sanfrecce Kunibiki FC
- 2014–2016: Rissho Univ. Shonan High School

College career
Years	Team	Apps	(Gls)
2017–2020	Fukuoka University		

Senior career*
Years	Team	Apps	(Gls)
2020–2024	Renofa Yamaguchi FC	99	(15)
2024–	Vegalta Sendai	35	(2)
2025	→ Blaublitz Akita (loan)	10	(0)
- * Club domestic league appearances and goals as of 17 August 2026

Tsubasa Umeki (梅木 翼, Umeki Tsubasa; born 24 November 1998) is a Japanese footballer currently playing as a midfielder for Vegalta Sendai.

== Career statistics ==
=== Club ===
As of 28 March 2021.

Appearances and goals by club, season and competition
Club	Season	League			National Cup		League Cup		Other		Total	
Club	Season	Division	Apps	Goals	Apps	Goals	Apps	Goals	Apps	Goals	Apps	Goals
Fukuoka University	2018	–			1 (Note: Appearances in the Emperor's Cup)	0	–		0	0	1	0
Renofa Yamaguchi FC	2020	J2 League	5	0	0	0	0	0	0	0	5	0
Renofa Yamaguchi FC	2021	J2 League	5	0	0	0	0	0	0	0	5	0
Renofa Yamaguchi FC	Total		10	0	0	0	0	0	0	0	10	0
Career total			10	0	1	0	0	0	0	0	11	0
