= Keiichiro Nuno =

Japanese footballer and manager

Keiichiro Nuno 布 啓一郎
Personal information
- Full name: Keiichiro Nuno
- Date of birth: 21 December 1960 (age 65)
- Place of birth: Chiba, Japan
- Height: 1.77 m (5 ft 9 1/2 in)
- Position: Defender

Youth career
- Years: Team
- 1976–1978: Chiba Higashi High School
- 1979–1982: Nippon Sport Science University

Managerial career
- 2003–2004: Japan U-17
- 2009–2010: Japan U-20
- 2018–2019: Thespakusatsu Gunma
- 2020: Matsumoto Yamaga FC
- 2021: FC Imabari
- 2022: Vonds Ichihara

Keiichiro Nuno (布 啓一郎, Nuno Keiichiro; born December 21, 1960) is a former Japanese football player and manager. He was currently manager of Vonds Ichihara until 31 January 2023.

== Coaching career ==
Nuno was born in Chiba Prefecture on December 21, 1960. After attending Nippon Sport Science University in the late 70s and winning the All Japan University Championship, he opted to sign as a head coach at Funabashi Municipal High School, a role he maintained for almost 20 years. He decided to quit in order to be the next head coach of Japan U-17 national team, but the results didn't support him and he left after two years. He had another chance with Japan's squads, this time with Japan U-20 national team, but at the 2010 AFC U-19 Championship Japan were knocked out by South Korea in the quarter-finals, and he left the position in 2010.

He returned to coach with Fagiano Okayama in 2015, where he maintained a role as an assistant coach to Tetsu Nagasawa. After three years, he was hired as the manager of Thespakusatsu Gunma.

In 2022, Nuno announcement officially appointment manager of Vonds Ichihara for ahead of 2022 season.

== Managerial statistics ==
Update; end of the 2022 season

Team	From	To	Record				
Team	From	To	G	W	D	L	Win %
Thespakusatsu Gunma	2018	2019	69	34	16	19	49.28
Matsumoto Yamaga	2020		22	4	7	11	18.18
FC Imabari	2021		13	2	5	6	15.38
Vonds Ichihara	2022		20	9	5	6	45.00
Total			124	49	33	42	39.52
