= FC Gifu =

Japanese football club

FC Gifu FC岐阜
- Full name: Gifu Football Club Co., Ltd.
- Founded: 2001; 25 years ago
- Ground: Gifu Nagaragawa Stadium; Gifu, Gifu Prefecture
- Capacity: 26,109
- Chairman: Hiroshi Komatsu
- Manager: Kiyotaka Ishimaru
- League: J3 League
- 2025: J3 League, 13th of 20
- Website: www.fc-gifu.com
Home colours	Away colours

Gifu Football Club Co., Ltd.
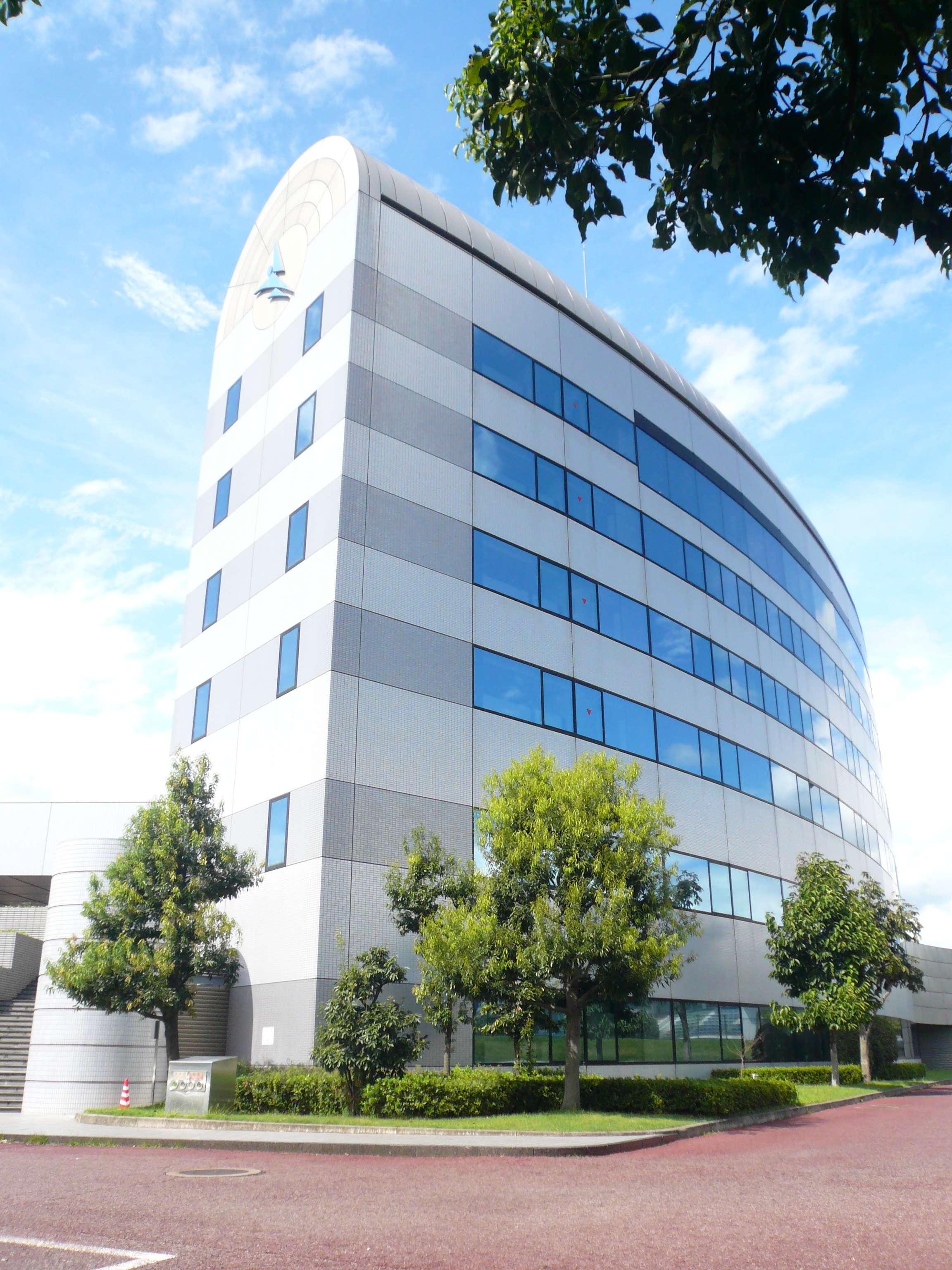
- Nagaragawa Sports Plaza houses the headquarters

Football Club Gifu (フットボールクラブ岐阜, Futtobōrukurabu Gifu), abbreviated as FC Gifu (FC岐阜, Efu Shī Gifu) is a Japanese football club based in Gifu, capital of Gifu Prefecture, Japan. They play in the J3 League, the third tier of Japanese professional football.

== History ==
During the Japan Soccer League and former Japan Football League years, the city and prefecture of Gifu were represented by the Seino Transportation Co. (西濃運輸 Seinō Un'yu) works team, which was relegated from the old JFL for the last time in 1997 and folded shortly thereafter in January 1998.

The modern-day Gifu club was founded in 2001 (Seino's last manager, Masayuki Katsuno, was among the founders, and a former Seino player, Takashi Umeda, later returned to town and joined the club following a decade-long stint with Oita Trinita). The club was promoted to the new Japan Football League in 2007 after beating Honda Lock S.C. in the promotion/relegation play-offs.

The team earned third place at the end of the 2007 season, meaning it qualified for promotion to J.League Division 2. On 3 December 2007, J. League approved a promotion for the team for the 2008 season.

The club finished the 2012 season in 21st place, narrowly missing out on relegation to the Japan Football League.

Between 2013 and 2018, the team constantly placed in the lower realms of J.League Division 2 (now renamed to J2 League) and narrowly avoided relegation until 2019, when they finished last in the league and were relegated to J3 League. Since then, the club has played in the J3 League.

== Crest ==
The team's crest was designed to represent Gifu Prefecture. The top of the crest represents the mountain ranges of the northern part of the prefecture. The flowers are Chinese milk vetch, which are the prefectural flower. Each of the three lines represents one of the Kiso Three Rivers flowing through the prefecture. The banner at the base of the crest is the same as the symbol on the helmet of the victorious Tokugawa clan at the Battle of Sekigahara in 1600.

== League & cup record ==
Champions	Runners-up	Third place	Promoted	Relegated

League													J.League Cup	Emperor's Cup
Season	Div.	Teams	Pos.	P	W	D	L	F	A	GD	Pts	Attendance/G	J.League Cup	Emperor's Cup
2001	Gifu Prefecture 1`	5	2nd	10	8	1	1	40	7	33	25		Not eligible	Did not qualify
2002	Gifu Prefecture 1`	5	1st	10	10	0	0	40	4	36	30		Not eligible	Did not qualify
2003	Gifu Prefecture 1`	5	1st	10	10	0	0	34	4	30	30		Not eligible	Did not qualify
2004	Tokai Division 2	8	3rd	14	8	0	6	22	21	1	24		Not eligible	Did not qualify
2005	Tokai Division 2	8	2nd	14	8	5	1	26	7	19	29		Not eligible	Did not qualify
2006	Tokai Division 1	8	1st	16	14	2	0	46	3	43	44		Not eligible	3rd round
2007	JFL	18	3rd	34	17	9	8	45	31	14	60	3,529	Not eligible	3rd round
2008	J2	15	13th	42	10	12	20	41	69	-28	42	3,745	Not eligible	4th round
2009	J2	18	12th	51	16	14	21	62	72	-10	62	4,302	Not eligible	Quarter final
2010	J2	19	14th	36	13	6	17	32	45	-13	45	3,108	Not eligible	2nd round
2011	J2	20	20th	38	6	6	26	39	83	-44	24	4,120	Not eligible	2nd round
2012	J2	22	21st	42	7	14	21	27	55	-28	35	4,270	Not eligible	2nd round
2013	J2	22	21st	42	9	10	23	37	80	-43	37	4,525	Not eligible	2nd round
2014	J2	22	17th	42	13	10	19	54	61	-7	49	7,584	Not eligible	2nd round
2015	J2	22	20th	42	12	7	23	37	71	-34	43	6,179	Not eligible	2nd round
2016	J2	22	20th	42	12	7	23	47	71	-24	43	5,662	Not eligible	1st round
2017	J2	22	18th	42	11	13	18	56	68	-12	46	6,977	Not eligible	3rd round
2018	J2	22	20th	42	11	9	22	44	62	-18	42	6,858	Not eligible	2nd round
2019	J2	22	22nd	42	7	9	26	33	78	-45	30	6,692	Not eligible	2nd round
2020 †	J3	18	6th	34	16	8	10	50	39	11	56	2,643	Not eligible	Did not qualify
2021 †	J3	15	6th	28	12	5	11	38	35	3	41	3,505	Not eligible	1st round
2022	J3	18	14th	34	10	7	17	43	53	-10	37	4,194	Not eligible	2nd round
2023	J3	20	8th	38	14	12	12	44	35	9	54	4,733	Not eligible	3rd round
2024	J3	20	8th	38	15	8	15	64	56	8	53	4,684	1st round	2nd round
2025	J3	20	13th	38	13	8	17	52	60	-8	47	4,772	1st round	2nd round
2026	J3	40	22nd	18	8	3	7	24	26	-2	28	5,805	N/A	N/A
2026-27	J3	20	TBD	38									TBD	TBD

Key

- Pos. = Position in league; P = Games played; W = Games won; D = Games drawn; L = Games lost; F = Goals scored; A = Goals conceded; GD = Goals difference; Pts = Points gained
- Attendance/G = Average home league attendance
- † 2020 & 2021 seasons attendances reduced by COVID-19 worldwide pandemic
- Source: J.League Data Site

== Honours ==
FC Gifu Honours
Honour	No.	Years
Gifu Prefecture Division 1	2	2002, 2003
Tōkai Division 1	1	2006
Gifu Prefectural Football Championship, Emperor's Cup Shizuoka Prefectural Qualifiers	6	2006, 2007, 2021, 2022, 2023, 2024

== Current squad ==
As of 5 November 2026.

Note: Flags indicate national team as defined under FIFA eligibility rules; some limited exceptions apply. Players may hold more than one non-FIFA nationality.

No.	Pos.	Nation	Player
2	DF	CIV	Kouadio-Yves Dabila
3	MF	JPN	Kodai Hagino
4	DF	JPN	Kentaro Kai
6	MF	JPN	Akito Fukuta
7	MF	JPN	Tatsuya Hakozaki
9	MF	JPN	Shun Nakamura
10	MF	JPN	Ryoma Kita
11	FW	CGO	Bevic Moussiti-Oko
14	MF	JPN	Haruto Suzuki (on loan from Nagoya Grampus)
17	FW	GLP	Jordan Tell
18	MF	JPN	Shoma Handa ^{DSP}
19	FW	JPN	Hayato Kanda (on loan from Fujieda MYFC)
20	MF	JPN	Shinri Kanamoto
21	FW	JPN	Tomoya Yokoyama
22	MF	PRK	Mun In-ju
23	DF	JPN	Ryo Toyama
25	GK	KOR	Jung Hyeon-ho

No.	Pos.	Nation	Player
26	DF	JPN	Shohei Ogushi
27	DF	JPN	Kento Haneda
30	GK	JPN	Sera Yamaguchi
34	DF	JPN	Koki Yumine
37	DF	JPN	Yuto Ajiki ^{DSP}
39	MF	JPN	Jin Izumisawa
43	FW	JPN	Hiroto Asada
47	MF	JPN	Takumi Matsui
50	MF	JPN	Yūsei Yashiki (on loan from Oita Trinita)
51	GK	JPN	Kazuaki Suganuma (on loan from Avispa Fukuoka)
55	GK	JPN	Shun Sato
66	DF	JPN	Fumiya Kitajima (on loan from Sagan Tosu)
77	GK	JPN	Ryusei Haruna (on loan from Mito HollyHock)
79	DF	JPN	Junya Fujita
90	DF	KOR	Kim Yu-geon
95	FW	JPN	Hayate Take
98	MF	JPN	Kanata Yakabi

=== Out on loan ===
Note: Flags indicate national team as defined under FIFA eligibility rules; some limited exceptions apply. Players may hold more than one non-FIFA nationality.

No.	Pos.	Nation	Player
99	FW	BRA	Fábio Azevedo (at YSCC Yokohama)
—	MF	JPN	Kowa Yonaha (at Okinawa SV)
—	FW	JPN	Yuya Nagai (at Nankatsu SC)

== Coaching staff ==
Position	Name
Manager	(Japan) Kiyotaka Ishimaru
First-team coach	(Japan) Yusuke Noda (Japan) Takuya Honda (Japan) Yuki Yoshimura
Goalkeeper coach	(Japan) Teppei Uesugi
Conditioning coach	(Japan) Shuichi Yoshimura
Conditioning advisor	(Japan) Nobuyuki Nozaki
Doctor	(Japan) Atsushi Yamaga
Trainer	(Japan) Hitoshi Suzuki (Japan) Yudai Kato (Japan) Yuki Hirano
Competent	(Japan) Kotaro Sakaguchi
Side affairs	(Japan) Hideaki Nobuta

== Managerial history ==
Manager	Nationality	From	To	P	W	D	L	W %
Masayuki Katsuno	Japan	1 January 2001	31 January 2006	63	44	6	13	69.84
Tetsuya Totsuka	Japan	1 February 2006	21 June 2007	38	29	5	4	76.32
Hideki Matsunaga	Japan	21 June 2007	31 January 2010	120	39	32	49	32.50
Yasuharu Kurata	Japan	1 February 2010	31 January 2011	37	13	6	18	35.14
Takahiro Kimura	Japan	1 February 2011	31 January 2012	39	6	6	27	15.38
Kōji Gyōtoku	Japan	1 February 2012	18 August 2013	72	13	20	39	18.06
Keiju Karashima	Japan	18 August 2013	31 January 2014	13	3	4	6	23.08
Ruy Ramos	Japan	1 February 2014	22 July 2016	111	32	20	59	28.83
Megumu Yoshida	Japan	22 July 2016	31 January 2017	18	5	4	9	27.78
Takeshi Ōki	Japan	1 February 2017	17 June 2019	105	26	26	53	24.76
Makoto Kitano	Japan	18 June 2019	31 January 2020	25	4	6	15	16.00
Zdravko Zemunović	Serbia	1 February 2020	20 September 2020	15	7	4	4	46.67
Kenji Nakada	Japan	21 September 2020	31 January 2021	19	9	4	6	47.37
Takayoshi Amma	Japan	1 February 2021	31 January 2022	29	12	5	12	41.38
Toshiya Miura	Japan	1 February 2022	5 May 2022	7	2	1	4	28.57
Yuji Yokoyama	Japan	6 May 2022	30 November 2022	29	9	6	14	31.03
Yusaku Ueno	Japan	1 December 2022	27 June 2024	62	24	17	21	38.71
Kenichi Amano	Japan	28 June 2024	2 December 2024	20	8	3	9	40.00
Yasuaki Oshima	Japan	1 January 2025	2 July 2025	18	4	5	9	22.22
Koji Ohashi (Interim)	Japan	2 July 2025	7 July 2025	1	0	0	1	0.00
Kiyotaka Ishimaru	Japan	7 July 2025	Current	0	0	0	0	—

== Kit evolution ==
Home
2007	2008 - 2009	2010 - 2011	2012	2013
2014	2015	2016	2017	2018
2019	2020	2021	2022	2023
2024 -	2025 -			

Away
2007	2008	2009	2010	2011
2012	2013	2014	2015	2016
2017	2018	2019	2020	2021
2022	2023	2024	2025 -	

== Other teams ==
They also run as a reserve team FC Gifu Second, which currently plays in the Tōkai Adult League Division 2. They have played in the Emperor's Cup and Shakaijin Cup in the past.
