= Han Yong-thae =

North Korean footballer (born 1996)

Personal information
- Date of birth: 30 October 1996 (age 30)
- Place of birth: Tokyo, Japan
- Height: 1.83 m (6 ft 0 in)
- Position: Forward

Youth career
- Tokyo Korean Daiichi Elementary School
- 2009–2011: Tokyo Korean Daiichi Jr. High School
- 2012–2014: Tokyo Korean High School

College career
Years	Team	Apps	(Gls)
2015–2018	Korea University		

Senior career*
Years	Team	Apps	(Gls)
2019–2021	Matsumoto Yamaga	6	(0)
2019	→ Kagoshima United (loan)	35	(11)
2020	→ Tochigi SC (loan)	9	(1)
2021–2023	Iwate Grulla Morioka	24	(1)
Total		74	(13)

International career
2018	North Korea U23	5	(1)
- * Club domestic league appearances and goals

Han Yong-thae (Korean: 한용태; born 30 October 1996) also known as Yuta Han, is a former footballer who played as a forward. Born in Japan, he has represented North Korea at youth level.

== Career ==
=== Matsumoto Yamaga ===
On 24 January 2019, Young-thae was promoted to the first team, and sent out on loan to Kagoshima United. He made his league debut against Renofa Yamaguchi on 1 November 2020. On 28 December 2020, Yong-thae's contract was renewed for the 2021 season.

=== Loan to Kagoshima United ===
Yong-thae scored on his league debut against Tokushima Vortis on 24 February 2019, scoring in the 51st minute.

=== Tochigi SC ===
On 28 December 2019, Yong-thae was announced at Tochigi SC. He made his league debut against V-Varen Nagasaki on 23 February 2020. Yong-thae scored his first league goal against FC Ryukyu on 19 August 2020, scoring in the 80th minute.

=== Iwate Grulla Morioka ===
On 5 February 2021, Yong-thae was announced at Iwate Grulla Morioka. He made his league debut against Tegevajaro Miyazaki on 14 March 2021. Yong-thae scored his first league goal against Vanraure Hachinohe, scoring a penalty in the 5th minute. On 21 January 2023, it was announced his contract would not be renewed.

On 4 August 2023, Yong-thae announced his retirement from football.

== Personal life ==
His brother is fellow footballer Han Yong-gi.
