= 2021 J3 League =

8th season of the Japanese J3 League

Meiji Yasuda J3 League
- Season: 2021
- Dates: 13 March – 5 December
- Champions: Roasso Kumamoto (1st title)
- Promoted: Roasso Kumamoto; Iwate Grulla Morioka
- Relegated: No relegation
- Matches: 210
- Goals: 533 (2.54 per match)
- Top goalscorer: Shota Kawanishi, FC Gifu (13 goals)
- Biggest home win: Azul Claro Numazu v Vanraure Hachinohe 7-2
- Highest scoring: Gainare Tottori v Nagano Parceiro 1-8; Azul Claro Numazu v Vanraure Hachinohe 7-2
- Longest winning run: Roasso Kumamoto 7 (28/08/21 – 16/10/2021)
- Longest unbeaten run: Roasso Kumamoto 12 (13/06/21 – 24/10/2021)
- Highest attendance: 11,314; Roasso Kumamoto 2–0 FC Gifu (5 December 2021)
- Lowest attendance: 264; Fukushima United FC 2–1 Iwate Grulla Morioka (26 May 2021)
- Total attendance: 401,776
- Average attendance: 1,913
- All statistics correct as of complete.

The 2021 J3 League, referred to as the 2021 Meiji Yasuda J3 League (Japanese: 2021 明治安田生命J3リーグ, Hepburn: 2021 Meiji Yasuda Seimei J3 Rīgu) for sponsorship reasons, was the 8th season of J3 League under its current name.

Roasso Kumamoto won the J3 title for the first time in their history, in their debut campaign at the J3 League, just three years after being relegation from the J2 League. They were promoted to the 2022 J2 League alongside Iwate Grulla Morioka. Iwate team won promotion for the J2 League for the first time.

== Overview ==
There were no relegations from J2 League in 2020 and the number of teams decreased for 2021.

This is first season without three U-23 teams from J1 in 2021 season. Four teams from J2 League automatically relegation for 2021 and two teams from J3 League automatically promotion. J3 League has been scheduled for an expansion to 18 clubs before the 2022 season. This is the last season played with 15 teams.

== Changes from the previous season ==
Promoted from 2020 JFL	Promoted to 2021 J2 League	Withdrawn / Disbanded
Tegevajaro Miyazaki	Blaublitz Akita; SC Sagamihara	Cerezo Osaka U-23; Gamba Osaka U-23; FC Tokyo U-23

2020 was also the last season where U-23 teams played in the professional setup. After two separate stints involving youth clubs in this division. First it was the J.League U-22 Selection in 2014 and 2015, and then three U-23 teams were involved from 2016 to 2020. FC Tokyo U-23 pulled out of the competition prior to the start of the 2020 season. Cerezo Osaka U-23 and Gamba Osaka U-23 were disbanded at the end of 2020 after completing the full season.

Blaublitz Akita and SC Sagamihara were promoted to J2 League, the later being the last club from the original clubs which started the maiden season in 2014 to be promoted from the third division.

One new team was promoted to the professional ranks of Japanese football, Tegevajaro Miyazaki, as runners-up in the 2020 JFL season and were promoted.

== Participating clubs ==
Locations of the 2021 J3 League teams

Club name	Home town	Stadium	Capacity	Last season	Licence
Azul Claro Numazu	Numazu	Ashitaka Stadium	10,000	J3（12th）	J3
FC Gifu	All cities/towns in Gifu (Note: centering on Gifu)	Gifu Nagaragawa Stadium	26,109	J3（5th）	J1
FC Imabari	Imabari	Arigato Service Dream Stadium	5,000	J3（6th）	J2
Fukushima United FC	Fukushima	Toho Stadium	21,000	J3（13th）	J3
Gainare Tottori	All cities/towns in Tottori (Note: centering on Tottori, Yonago, Kurayoshi, Sakaiminato)	Axis Bird Stadium	16,033	J3（8th）	J2
Iwate Grulla Morioka	All cities/towns in Iwate	Iwagin Stadium	4,946	J3（11th）	J2
Kamatamare Sanuki	All cities/towns in Kagawa (Note: centering on Takamatsu, Marugame)	Pikara Stadium	30,099	J3（16th）	J2
Kagoshima United	Kagoshima	Shiranami Stadium	19,934	J3（4th）	J1
Kataller Toyama	All cities/towns in Toyama (Note: centering on Toyama)	Toyama Athletic Stadium	25,251	J3（9th）	J1
Fujieda MYFC	Cities/towns in Shizuoka Prefecture (Note: Fujieda, Shimada, Yaizu, Makinohara, Yoshida, Kawanehonmachi)	Fujieda Soccer Field	13,000	J3（10th）	J3
Nagano Parceiro	Nagano	Nagano U Stadium	15,491	J3（3rd）	J2
Roasso Kumamoto	Kumamoto, Kumamoto	Egao Kenko Stadium	32,000	J3（7th）	J1
Tegevajaro Miyazaki	Miyazaki & Shintomi, Miyazaki	Unilever Stadium Shintomi	5,000	Promoted from JFL（2nd）	J3
Vanraure Hachinohe	Eastern cities/towns in Aomori (Note: Hachinohe, Towada, Gonohe, Sannohe, Takko, Hashikami, Nanbu, Shingo, Oirase, Misawa, Shichinohe, Rokunohe, Tohoku, Noheji, Yokohama, Rokkasho)	Prifoods Stadium	5,200	J3（15th）	J3
YSCC Yokohama	Yokohama	Nippatsu Mitsuzawa Stadium	15,454	J3（17th）	J3

=== Personnel and kits ===
Club	Manager	Captain	Kit manufacturer
Azul Claro Numazu	(Japan) Masataka Imai	(Japan) Masayuki Tokutake	(Germany) Puma
FC Gifu	(Japan) Takayoshi Amma	(Japan) Kentaro Kai	(Japan) RAZZOLI
FC Imabari	(Japan) Keiichiro Nuno	(Japan) Keishi Kusumi	(Germany) Adidas
Fukushima United FC	(Japan) Yu Tokisaki	(Japan) Makoto Kawanishi (Japan) Hiroto Morooka (Japan) Tomoyasu Yoshida	(Denmark) hummel
Gainare Tottori	(North Korea) Kim Jong-song	(Japan) Masataka Kani	(Japan) Soccer Junky
Iwate Grulla Morioka	(Japan) Yutaka Akita	(Japan) Yusuke Muta	(United States) Under Armour
Kagoshima United FC	(Japan) Yasuaki Oshima	(Japan) Noriyuki Sakemoto	(Japan) ANGUA
Kamatamare Sanuki	(Serbia) Zdravko Zemunović	(Japan) Akira Takeuchi	(Brazil) ATHLETA
Kataller Toyama	(Japan) Nobuhiro Ishizaki	(Japan) Yohei Nishibe	(Japan) GOLDWin
Fujieda MYFC	(Japan) Yasuharu Kurata	(Japan) Takuya Sugimoto	(Japan) gol.
Nagano Parceiro	(Japan) Yuji Yokoyama	TBA	(Brazil) Penalty
Roasso Kumamoto	(Japan) Takeshi Oki	(Japan) Tomotaka Okamoto	(Germany) Puma
Tegevajaro Miyazaki	(Japan) Naruyuki Naito	(Japan) Kenji Dai	(Japan) YONEX
Vanraure Hachinohe	(Japan) Masahiro Kuzuno	(Japan) Teppei Chikaishi	(Denmark) hummel
YSCC Yokohama	(Japan) / (Germany) Yuki Stalph	(Japan) Kento Dodate	(Japan) younger

== Managerial changes ==
Team	Outgoing	Manner	Exit date		Position in table	Incoming	Incoming date		Ref.
Team	Outgoing	Manner	Announced on	Departed on	Position in table	Incoming	Announced on	Arrived on	Ref.
Kamatamare Sanuki	(Japan) Nobuyuki Uenoyama	Resigns	31 March 2021	31 March 2021	15th	(Japan) Toshihiro Nishimura (Interim)	1 April 2021	1 April 2021	
Kamatamare Sanuki	(Japan) Toshihiro Nishimura	End of Interim period	11 April 2021	11 April 2021	15th	(Serbia) Zdravko Zemunovic	12 April 2021	12 April 2021	
Gainare Tottori	(Japan) Riki Takagi	Dismissed	6 May 2021	4 May 2021	12th	(North Korea) Kim Jong-song	10 May 2021	10 May 2021	
FC Imabari	(Spain) Lluís Planagumà	Dismissed	19 May 2021	18 May 2021	13th	(Japan) Kazuaki Hashikawa (Interim)	19 May 2021	19 May 2021	
FC Imabari	(Japan) Kazuaki Hashikawa	End of Interim period	23 May 2021	23 May 2021	13th	(Japan) Keiichiro Nuno	24 May 2021	24 May 2021	
Kagoshima United	(Australia) Arthur Papas	Resigned	28 May 2021	28 May 2021	9th	(Japan) Yasuaki Oshima	28 May 2021	28 May 2021	
Fujieda MYFC	(Japan) Yasuharu Kurata	Resigned	12 July 2021	12 July 2021	12th	(Japan) Daisuke Sudo	12 July 2021	12 July 2021	
FC Imabari	(Japan) Keiichiro Nuno	Resigned	29 September 2021	29 September 2021	12th	(Japan) Kazuaki Hashikawa	29 September 2021	29 September 2021	

== League table ==
Pos	Team	Pld	W	D	L	GF	GA	GD	Pts	Promotion
1	Roasso Kumamoto (C, P)	28	15	9	4	39	20	+19	54	Promotion to J2 League (Note: Only teams that hold a J2 license are eligible for promotion.)
2	Iwate Grulla Morioka (P)	28	15	8	5	43	28	+15	53	Promotion to J2 League
3	Tegevajaro Miyazaki (Note: The team held neither a J1 nor J2 license, and so was ineligible for promotion to the J2 League.)	28	16	5	7	44	31	+13	53	
4	Kataller Toyama	28	13	7	8	40	34	+6	46	
5	Fukushima United	28	13	6	9	41	32	+9	45 (Note: The match between Fukushima United and Vanraure Hachinohe resulted in a 2–0 win for Fukushima, but was changed to an awarded 0–3 scoreline by the J.League, after Fukushima allowed a player who had not received a negative test to play in the game. The original result was restored following a decision by the JFA Appeal Committee.)	
6	FC Gifu	28	12	5	11	38	35	+3	41	
7	Kagoshima United	28	11	7	10	34	35	−1	40	
8	YSCC Yokohama	28	11	7	10	31	33	−2	40	
9	Nagano Parceiro	28	8	12	8	35	28	+7	36	
10	Fujieda MYFC	28	8	8	12	42	42	0	32	
11	FC Imabari	28	7	9	12	34	33	+1	30	
12	Gainare Tottori	28	9	2	17	36	53	−17	29	
13	Vanraure Hachinohe	28	7	8	13	24	44	−20	29	
14	Azul Claro Numazu	28	7	6	15	32	44	−12	27	
15	Kamatamare Sanuki	28	4	9	15	20	41	−21	21	

Source: 2021 MEIJI YASUDA J3 LEAGUE League table, J.League Data Site
Rules for classification: 1) Points; 2) Goal difference; 3) Head-to-head points; 4) Head-to-head goal difference; 5) Head-to-head goal scored; 6) Number of wins; 7) Goals scored; 8) Fair-play points
(C) Champions; (P) Promoted

== Stadiums ==
Primary venues used in the J3 League:

Vanraure Hachinohe	Iwate Grulla Morioka	Fukushima United FC	YSCC Yokohama	Nagano Parceiro
Prifoods Stadium	Iwagin Stadium	Toho Stadium	Nippatsu Mitsuzawa Stadium	Nagano U Stadium
Capacity: 5,124	Capacity: 5,046	Capacity: 6,464	Capacity: 15,440	Capacity: 15,515
Kataller Toyama	Fujieda MYFC	Azul Claro Numazu	FC Gifu	Gainare Tottori
Toyama Stadium	Fujieda Soccer Stadium	Ashitaka Park Stadium	Gifu Nagaragawa Stadium	Axis Bird Stadium
Capacity: 18,588	Capacity: 5,056	Capacity: 5,104	Capacity: 16,310	Capacity: 11,999
Kamatamare Sanuki	FC Imabari	Roasso Kumamoto	Tegevajaro Miyazaki	Kagoshima United FC
Pikara Stadium	Arigato Service Dream Stadium	Egao Kenko Stadium	Unilever Stadium Shintomi	Shiranami Stadium
Capacity: 22,338	Capacity: 5,063	Capacity: 30,449	Capacity: 5,354	Capacity: 12,606

== Season statistics ==
=== Top scorers ===
As of December 5th, 2021

Rank	Player	Club	Goals
1	(Japan) Shota Kawanishi	FC Gifu	13
2	(Japan) Kosuke Fujioka	Tegevajaro Miyazaki	10
3	(Japan) Yohei Ono	Kataller Toyama	9
3	(Japan) Naoki Sanda	Nagano Parceiro	9
3	(Japan) Rei Yonezawa	Kagoshima United FC	9
3	(Japan) Yuya Taguchi	Gainare Tottori	9
3	(Japan) Hiroki Higuchi	Fukushima United	9
3	(Japan) Kaito Umeda	Tegevajaro Miyazaki	9
4	(Japan) Toshiki Takahashi	Roasso Kumamoto	8
4	(Nigeria) Origbaajo Ismaila	Fukushima United	8
5	(Japan) Ömer Tokac	Fukushima United	7
5	(Japan) Ryo Watanabe	Azul Claro Numazu	7

=== Hat-tricks ===
Player	For	Against	Result	Date
(Japan) Naoki Sanda	Nagano Parceiro	Gainare Tottori	1–8 (A)	13 June 2021

== See also ==
- Japan Football Association (JFA)

League

- Japanese association football league system
- J.League
  - 2021 J1 League (Tier 1)
  - 2021 J2 League (Tier 2)
- 2021 Japan Football League (JFL; Tier 4)
- 2021 Regional Champions League (Promotion playoffs to JFL)
- 2021 Regional Leagues (Tier 5/6)

Cup(s)

- 2021 Fuji Xerox Super Cup (Super Cup)
- 2021 Emperor's Cup (National Open Cup)
- 2021 J.League YBC Levain Cup (League Cup)
