= List of J2 League football transfers winter 2017–18 =

This is a list of Japanese football J1 League transfers in the winter transfer window 2017–18 by club.

== Ventforet Kofu ==
In: Note: Flags indicate national team as defined under FIFA eligibility rules; some limited exceptions apply. Players may hold more than one non-FIFA nationality.

No.	Pos.	Nation	Player
2	DF	JPN	Masato Yuzawa (from (Japan) Kashiwa Reysol)
3	DF	KOR	Byeon Jun-byum (from (Japan) Shimizu S-Pulse)
5	MF	JPN	Ryo Kubota (from (Japan) Kataller Toyama)
9	FW	BRA	Dinei (from (Japan) Shonan Bellmare)
13	FW	JPN	Shusuke Ota (from Nippon Sport Science University)
17	FW	JPN	Hidetaka Kanazono (on loan from (Japan) Consadole Sapporo)
19	MF	JPN	Kazuki Kozuka (from (Japan) Albirex Niigata)
21	MF	JPN	Sho Araki (from Kokushikan University)
26	MF	JPN	Kazuhiro Sato (from (Japan) Mito HollyHock)
27	DF	JPN	Shohei Abe (from (Japan) JEF United Chiba, previously on loan)
29	FW	BRA	Junior Barros (re-registered)
32	DF	JPN	Keita Irumagawa (promoted from youth ranks)
33	DF	JPN	Takuya Akiyama (from Albirex Niigata Singapore)
34	DF	JPN	Yuta Imazu (from Ryutsu Keizai University)

Out: Note: Flags indicate national team as defined under FIFA eligibility rules; some limited exceptions apply. Players may hold more than one non-FIFA nationality.

No.	Pos.	Nation	Player
3	DF	JPN	Hiroto Hatao (to (Japan) Nagoya Grampus)
5	DF	JPN	Ryo Shinzato (to (Japan) Júbilo Iwata)
7	MF	JPN	Katsuya Ishihara (retired)
10	FW	BRA	Dudu (on loan to (Japan) Avispa Fukuoka)
13	FW	JPN	Akito Kawamoto (released)
15	MF	JPN	Akihiro Hyodo (to (Japan) Shimizu S-Pulse)
17	DF	JPN	Takuma Tsuda (to (Japan) Tochigi Uva FC)
19	MF	JPN	Koki Wakasugi (to (Japan) Tochigi Uva FC)
20	MF	JPN	Masato Kurogi (to (Japan) V-Varen Nagasaki)
21	MF	AUS	Oliver Bozanic (released)
26	DF	JPN	Shun Kumagai (to Albirex Niigata Singapore)
29	FW	GRE	Billy (released)
30	MF	JPN	Kazunari Hosaka (to (Japan) Tochigi Uva FC)
41	DF	JPN	Yukio Tsuchiya (to (Japan) Tokyo 23 FC)

== Albirex Niigata ==
In: Note: Flags indicate national team as defined under FIFA eligibility rules; some limited exceptions apply. Players may hold more than one non-FIFA nationality.

No.	Pos.	Nation	Player
2	DF	JPN	Kenta Hirose (from (Japan) Shonan Bellmare)
3	DF	JPN	Michihiro Yasuda (from Albirex Niigata Singapore)
11	FW	BRA	Thalles (from (Brazil) Vasco da Gama)
16	FW	JPN	Arata Watanabe (from Ryutsu Keizai University)
21	GK	JPN	Yasuhiro Watanabe (from Japan Soccer College, end of loan)
23	DF	JPN	Yasutaka Yanagi (from Albirex Niigata Singapore)
26	MF	JPN	Sachiro Toshima (from University of Tsukuba)
27	FW	BRA	Bruno Meneghel (from (China) Changchun Yatai)
29	DF	JPN	Taiki Watanabe (from Maebashi Ikuei High School)
30	GK	JPN	Junto Taguchi (from (Japan) Yokohama F. Marinos)
33	MF	JPN	Yoshiaki Takagi (from (Japan) Tokyo Verdy)
38	GK	BRA	Alex Muralha (from (Brazil) Flamengo)
40	MF	JPN	Yoshizumi Ogawa (from (Japan) Sagan Tosu, previously on loan)
50	MF	JPN	Daisuke Sakai (on loan from (Japan) Oita Trinita)

Out: Note: Flags indicate national team as defined under FIFA eligibility rules; some limited exceptions apply. Players may hold more than one non-FIFA nationality.

No.	Pos.	Nation	Player
2	DF	JPN	Kazunari Ono (to (Japan) Shonan Bellmare)
5	DF	JPN	Takanori Maeno (to (Japan) Ehime FC)
7	FW	BRA	Roni (to (Brazil) Botafogo)
8	MF	JPN	Kei Koizumi (to (Japan) Kashiwa Reysol)
9	FW	JPN	Ryohei Yamazaki (to (Japan) Kashiwa Reysol)
10	MF	BRA	Thiago Galhardo (to (Brazil) Ponte Preta, end of loan)
11	FW	BRA	Douglas Tanque (released)
15	MF	JPN	Isao Honma (retired)
18	MF	JPN	Sho Naruoka (to (Japan) SC Sagamihara)
21	GK	JPN	Tatsuya Morita (to (Japan) Matsumoto Yamaga)
22	GK	JPN	Goro Kawanami (to (Japan) Vegalta Sendai)
23	MF	JPN	Noriyoshi Sakai (to (Japan) Omiya Ardija)
26	DF	JPN	Goson Sakai (released)
29	MF	JPN	Shunsuke Mori (on loan to (Japan) Tokyo Verdy)
30	MF	PER	Romero Frank (to (Japan) Machida Zelvia)
31	GK	JPN	Koji Inada (retired)
39	FW	JPN	Takamitsu Tomiyama (to (Japan) Sagan Tosu, end of loan)
—	DF	JPN	Shigeto Masuda (to (Japan) Fagiano Okayama)
—	DF	JPN	Goson Sakai (to (Germany) LSK Hansa)
—	MF	JPN	Kazuki Kozuka (to (Japan) Ventforet Kofu)
—	FW	JPN	Musashi Suzuki (to (Japan) V-Varen Nagasaki)

== Omiya Ardija ==
In: Note: Flags indicate national team as defined under FIFA eligibility rules; some limited exceptions apply. Players may hold more than one non-FIFA nationality.

No.	Pos.	Nation	Player
5	DF	JPN	Taisuke Nakamura (from (Japan) Júbilo Iwata)
7	MF	JPN	Yuta Mikado (from (Japan) Avispa Fukuoka)
9	FW	SWE	Robin Simović (from (Japan) Nagoya Grampus)
20	MF	JPN	Noriyoshi Sakai (from (Japan) Albirex Niigata)
22	GK	JPN	Takashi Kasahara (from (Japan) Mito HollyHock)
28	FW	JPN	Takamitsu Tomiyama (from (Japan) Sagan Tosu)
33	MF	JPN	Kanji Okunuki (promoted from youth ranks)
34	FW	JPN	Kazuaki Saso (from Shohei High School)
39	MF	JPN	Shintaro Shimada (from (Japan) Roasso Kumamoto)

Out: Note: Flags indicate national team as defined under FIFA eligibility rules; some limited exceptions apply. Players may hold more than one non-FIFA nationality.

No.	Pos.	Nation	Player
7	FW	JPN	Ataru Esaka (to (Japan) Kashiwa Reysol)
11	FW	JPN	Ryuji Bando (to (Japan) FC Ryukyu)
20	DF	JPN	Tsubasa Oya (to (Japan) Tokushima Vortis)
22	DF	JPN	Takuya Wada (to (Japan) Sanfrecce Hiroshima)
28	MF	JPN	Aria Jasuru Hasegawa (to (Japan) Nagoya Grampus)
38	MF	JPN	Riku Yamada (on loan to (Japan) Grulla Morioka)
44	MF	JPN	Yusuke Segawa (to (Japan) Kashiwa Reysol)
47	MF	JPN	Yuzo Iwakami (to (Japan) Matsumoto Yamaga)
50	GK	JPN	Kenya Matsui (to (Japan) Mito HollyHock)
—	GK	JPN	Keiki Shimizu (on loan to (Japan) Blaublitz Akita)
—	DF	JPN	Yuko Takase (to (Japan) Roasso Kumamoto)
—	MF	JPN	Tomonobu Yokoyama (to (Japan) Consadole Sapporo, previously on loan)
—	FW	JPN	Takumu Fujinuma (on loan to (Japan) Grulla Morioka)

== Avispa Fukuoka ==
In: Note: Flags indicate national team as defined under FIFA eligibility rules; some limited exceptions apply. Players may hold more than one non-FIFA nationality.

No.	Pos.	Nation	Player
4	MF	JPN	Yu Tamura (from (Japan) Urawa Red Diamonds, end of loan)
7	FW	KOR	Yu In-soo (on loan from (Japan) FC Tokyo)
8	MF	JPN	Jun Suzuki (from (Japan) Oita Trinita, end of loan)
9	FW	BRA	Tulio de Melo (from (Brazil) Chapecoense)
13	FW	JPN	Koki Kido (from Meiji University)
14	MF	JPN	Takuma Edamura (on loan from (Japan) Shimizu S-Pulse)
15	FW	JPN	Takayuki Morimoto (from (Japan) Kawasaki Frontale)
18	FW	BRA	Dudu (on loan from (Japan) Ventforet Kofu)
21	GK	JPN	Kentaro Kakoi (on loan from (Japan) Cerezo Osaka)
22	DF	JPN	Naoki Wako (from (Japan) Kashiwa Reysol)
27	FW	JPN	So Hirao (on loan from (Japan) Gamba Osaka)
39	DF	JPN	Kojiro Shinohara (from (Japan) Fagiano Okayama)

Out: Note: Flags indicate national team as defined under FIFA eligibility rules; some limited exceptions apply. Players may hold more than one non-FIFA nationality.

No.	Pos.	Nation	Player
7	MF	JPN	Yuta Mikado (to (Japan) Omiya Ardija)
9	FW	JPN	Takayuki Nakahara (to (Japan) ReinMeer Aomori)
11	FW	JPN	Daisuke Sakata (retired)
14	DF	JPN	Takehiro Tomiyasu (to (Belgium) Sint-Truiden V.V.)
15	DF	JPN	Toshiya Sueyoshi (to (Japan) Fagiano Okayama)
17	FW	BRA	Wellington (to (Japan) Vissel Kobe)
18	DF	JPN	Masashi Kamekawa (to (Japan) Kashiwa Reysol)
21	FW	JPN	Willian Popp (to (South Korea) Buncheon FC)
22	DF	JPN	Hokuto Nakamura (to (Japan) V-Varen Nagasaki)
24	FW	JPN	Teruhito Nakagawa (to (Japan) Yokohama F. Marinos, end of loan)
29	MF	BRA	Gilsinho (released)
39	MF	JPN	Yuta Mishima (to (Japan) Tegevajaro Miyazaki)

== Tokyo Verdy ==
In: Note: Flags indicate national team as defined under FIFA eligibility rules; some limited exceptions apply. Players may hold more than one non-FIFA nationality.

No.	Pos.	Nation	Player
2	DF	JPN	Masashi Wakasa (from (Japan) JEF United Chiba)
8	MF	JPN	Tatsuya Uchida (from (Japan) Gamba Osaka, previously on loan)
11	FW	JPN	Ryohei Hayashi (from (Japan) Mito HollyHock)
13	DF	JPN	Yusuke Higa (from (Japan) JEF United Chiba)
16	MF	JPN	Yuhei Sato (from (Japan) Montedio Yamagata)
17	DF	PRK	Ri Yong-jik (from (Japan) Kamatamare Sanuki)
21	GK	JPN	Naoto Kamifukumoto (from (Japan) Oita Trinita)
24	MF	JPN	Yuta Narawa (on loan from (Japan) Shonan Bellmare)
25	FW	JPN	Hiromu Kori (from (Japan) Gamba Osaka, end of loan)
26	MF	JPN	Kazuma Takai (from (Japan) Thespakusatsu Gunma)
28	FW	JPN	Hiroki Sugajima (from (Japan) JEF United Chiba, end of loan)
29	MF	JPN	Shunsuke Mori (on loan from (Japan) Albirex Niigata)
31	GK	JPN	Hiroyuki Takeda (from (Japan) Cerezo Osaka, previously on loan)
34	GK	JPN	Ko Hasegawa (from Nippon Sport Science University)
35	MF	JPN	Kanya Fujimoto (promoted from youth ranks)

Out: Note: Flags indicate national team as defined under FIFA eligibility rules; some limited exceptions apply. Players may hold more than one non-FIFA nationality.

No.	Pos.	Nation	Player
2	DF	JPN	Koki Anzai (to (Japan) Kashima Antlers)
6	DF	JPN	Kazuki Anzai (to (Japan) Sagan Tosu)
8	MF	JPN	Masaki Chugo (retired)
10	MF	JPN	Yoshiaki Takagi (to (Japan) Albirex Niigata)
18	FW	JPN	Daisuke Takagi (on loan to (Japan) Renofa Yamaguchi)
25	FW	JPN	Kazuki Hiramoto (retired)
26	GK	JPN	Gakuji Ota (on loan to (Japan) Tokushima Vortis)
30	DF	JPN	Jumpei Takaki (retired)
34	GK	JPN	Keisuke Naito (released)
—	GK	JPN	William Popp (to (Japan) Kawasaki Frontale, previously on loan)
—	DF	JPN	Satoru Oki (to (Japan) Tochigi Uva FC)

== JEF United Chiba ==
In: Note: Flags indicate national team as defined under FIFA eligibility rules; some limited exceptions apply. Players may hold more than one non-FIFA nationality.

No.	Pos.	Nation	Player
1	GK	ARG	Diego Matías Rodríguez (on loan from (Argentina) Rosario Central)
4	DF	BRA	Hebert (from (Poland) Piast Gliwice)
5	DF	JPN	Tatsuya Masushima (on loan from (Japan) Kashiwa Reysol)
13	MF	JPN	Hirotaka Tameda (from (Japan) Avispa Fukuoka, previously on loan)
14	MF	JPN	Shuto Kojima (from (Japan) Ehime FC)
16	DF	JPN	Koji Toriumi (from Meiji University)
18	MF	JPN	Andrew Kumagai (from (Japan) Yokohama F. Marinos, previously on loan)
20	MF	JPN	Asahi Yada (from (Japan) Nagoya Grampus, previously on loan)
25	MF	JPN	Yusuke Chajima (on loan from (Japan) Sanfrecce Hiroshima)
27	DF	JPN	Toshiya Takagi (from (Japan) Montedio Yamagata)
32	DF	JPN	Danto Sugiyama (from Funabashi High School)
34	FW	JPN	Daigo Furukawa (promoted from youth ranks)
38	MF	JPN	Koki Honda (from Kagawa Nishi High School)
39	FW	JPN	Makito Yoshida (from (Japan) Machida Zelvia, end of loan)

Out: Note: Flags indicate national team as defined under FIFA eligibility rules; some limited exceptions apply. Players may hold more than one non-FIFA nationality.

No.	Pos.	Nation	Player
1	GK	JPN	Masahiro Okamoto (on loan to (Japan) Ehime FC)
4	DF	JPN	Kengo Kitazume (to (Japan) Yokohama FC)
5	DF	JPN	Atsuto Tatara (to (Japan) Roasso Kumamoto)
14	MF	PAR	Eduardo Aranda (released)
16	FW	JPN	Hiroki Sugajima (to (Japan) Tokyo Verdy, end of loan)
17	DF	JPN	Yuki Okubo (retired)
20	DF	JPN	Masashi Wakasa (to (Japan) Tokyo Verdy)
22	MF	JPN	Naotake Hanyu (retired)
24	DF	KOR	Lee Joo-young (to (South Korea) Gangwon FC)
25	DF	JPN	Yusuke Higa (to (Japan) Tokyo Verdy)
29	GK	JPN	Kaito Yamamoto (on loan to (Japan) Yokohama FC)
37	DF	KOR	Kim Byeom-yong (to (Japan) Shimizu S-Pulse, end of loan)
40	GK	ARG	Luis Ojeda (released)
—	DF	JPN	Shohei Abe (to (Japan) Ventforet Kofu, previously on loan)
—	DF	JPN	Itsuki Urata (to (Japan) Giravanz Kitakyushu, previously on loan)
—	MF	JPN	Junki Koike (to (Japan) Ehime FC, previously on loan)
—	MF	BRA	Paulinho (to (Japan) Matsumoto Yamaga, previously on loan)
—	MF	JPN	Kyoga Nakamura (to (Japan) YSCC Yokohama, previously on loan)
—	MF	JPN	Issei Takahashi (on loan to (Japan) Renofa Yamaguchi)

== Tokushima Vortis ==
In: Note: Flags indicate national team as defined under FIFA eligibility rules; some limited exceptions apply. Players may hold more than one non-FIFA nationality.

No.	Pos.	Nation	Player
1	GK	CRC	Danny Carvajal (on loan from (Spain) Albacete Balompié)
2	DF	BRA	Bueno (on loan from (Japan) Kashima Antlers)
6	MF	ESP	Sisinio (from (Japan) FC Gifu)
9	FW	BRA	Nathan Júnior (from (Saudi Arabia) Al-Fateh)
13	FW	JPN	Hiroto Goya (on loan from (Japan) Gamba Osaka)
16	MF	JPN	Masaki Watai (from Shizuoka Gakuen High School)
19	FW	JPN	Takuma Sonoda (from (Japan) Azul Claro Numazu)
21	GK	JPN	Yuji Kajikawa (from (Japan) Shonan Bellmare, previously on loan)
24	MF	JPN	Haruki Izawa (on loan from (Japan) Urawa Red Diamonds)
25	MF	JPN	Kohei Uchida (from (Japan) Mito HollyHock)
27	DF	JPN	Yuki Omoto (from (Japan) FC Gifu)
28	DF	JPN	Tsubasa Oya (from (Japan) Omiya Ardija)
30	FW	JPN	Kiyoshiro Tsuboi (from Toyama Daiichi High School)
—	GK	JPN	Gakuji Ota (on loan from (Japan) Tokyo Verdy)
—	FW	JPN	Shiryu Fujiwara (promoted from youth ranks)

Out: Note: Flags indicate national team as defined under FIFA eligibility rules; some limited exceptions apply. Players may hold more than one non-FIFA nationality.

No.	Pos.	Nation	Player
1	GK	JPN	Takashi Aizawa (released)
2	DF	SRB	Nikola Vasiljević (to (Belarus) BATE Borisov)
6	MF	BRA	Carlinhos Paraiba (released)
7	MF	JPN	Yuji Kimura (to (Japan) Mito HollyHock)
10	MF	JPN	Junya Osaki (to (Japan) Renofa Yamaguchi)
13	MF	JPN	Ryo Matsumura (to (Japan) Vissel Kobe, end of loan)
14	MF	JPN	Takeshi Hamada (retired)
16	FW	JPN	Daiki Watari (to (Japan) Sanfrecce Hiroshima)
25	DF	JPN	Daisuke Tomita (to (Japan) Mito HollyHock)
27	DF	JPN	Kazuaki Mawatari (to (Japan) Sanfrecce Hiroshima)
28	MF	JPN	Atsushi Izawa (to (Japan) Tochigi Uva FC)
34	MF	JPN	Shohei Kiyohara (to (Japan) Cerezo Osaka, end of loan)
—	MF	JPN	Yoji Sasaki (to (Japan) Kataller Toyama, previously on loan)
—	FW	ARG	Nicolas Orsini (on loan to (Paraguay) Sportivo Luqueno)

== Matsumoto Yamaga ==
In: Note: Flags indicate national team as defined under FIFA eligibility rules; some limited exceptions apply. Players may hold more than one non-FIFA nationality.

No.	Pos.	Nation	Player
1	GK	JPN	Tatsuya Morita (from (Japan) Albirex Niigata)
2	DF	JPN	Nobuhisa Urata (from (Japan) Ehime FC)
5	MF	JPN	Ibuki Fujita (from (Japan) Ehime FC)
7	FW	JPN	Daizen Maeda (from (Japan) Mito HollyHock, end of loan)
10	MF	JPN	Keiya Nakami (from (Japan) Sagan Tosu)
14	MF	BRA	Paulinho (from (Japan) JEF United Chiba, previously on loan)
17	MF	JPN	Takaaki Shichi (from (Japan) Fukushima United FC, end of loan)
25	MF	JPN	Naoki Maeda (from (Japan) Yokohama F. Marinos)
27	MF	JPN	Akira Ando (from (Japan) Shonan Bellmare)
29	DF	JPN	Yota Shimokawa (from Osaka University of Commerce)
34	DF	KOR	Jo Jin-woo (from Incheon South High School)
35	DF	JPN	Daolo Morimoto (from Kanto Gakuin University)
36	DF	JPN	Yuki Muto (from Hosei University)
37	MF	JPN	Mitsuo Yamada (from Sendai University)
38	FW	JPN	Ryo Nagai (from (Japan) Nagoya Grampus)
47	MF	JPN	Yuzo Iwakami (from (Japan) Omiya Ardija)

Out: Note: Flags indicate national team as defined under FIFA eligibility rules; some limited exceptions apply. Players may hold more than one non-FIFA nationality.

No.	Pos.	Nation	Player
1	GK	JPN	Eisuke Fujishima (to (Japan) Sagan Tosu, end of loan)
6	DF	JPN	Jun Ando (to (Japan) Ehime FC)
7	MF	JPN	Takuya Takei (released)
13	DF	JPN	Keita Goto (to (Japan) Fagiano Okayama)
15	MF	JPN	Masaki Miyasaka (on loan to (Japan) Oita Trinita)
17	DF	BRA	Diego (to (Brazil) Joinville EC, end of loan)
24	DF	JPN	Masahiro Nasukawa (to (Japan) Oita Trinita)
26	FW	JPN	Yoshiki Oka (on loan to (Japan) Azul Claro Numazu)
27	MF	JPN	Ryutaro Shibata (retired)
28	DF	JPN	Kenshiro Tanioku (to (Japan) Kataller Toyama)
39	FW	BRA	Davi (released)
44	DF	JPN	Genki Miyaichi (on loan to (Japan) Azul Claro Numazu)
50	FW	JPN	Musashi Suzuki (to (Japan) Albirex Niigata, end of loan)

== Oita Trinita ==
In: Note: Flags indicate national team as defined under FIFA eligibility rules; some limited exceptions apply. Players may hold more than one non-FIFA nationality.

No.	Pos.	Nation	Player
3	DF	JPN	Masahiro Nasukawa (from (Japan) Matsumoto Yamaga)
10	FW	JPN	Noriaki Fujimoto (from (Japan) Kagoshima United FC)
16	DF	KOR	Lim Seung-gyeom (on loan from (Japan) Nagoya Grampus)
19	DF	JPN	Yuji Hoshi (from (Japan) Renofa Yamaguchi)
23	GK	JPN	Akishige Kaneda (from (Japan) Avispa Fukuoka)
33	MF	JPN	Takuya Marutani (from (Japan) Sanfrecce Hiroshima)
35	MF	JPN	Masaki Miyasaka (on loan from (Japan) Matsumoto Yamaga)
38	MF	JPN	Kenji Baba (from (Japan) Kamatamare Sanuki)
41	DF	JPN	Ryosuke Tone (from (Japan) Giravanz Kitakyushu)
50	DF	JPN	Shinji Yamaguchi (on loan from (Japan) Vissel Kobe)

Out: Note: Flags indicate national team as defined under FIFA eligibility rules; some limited exceptions apply. Players may hold more than one non-FIFA nationality.

No.	Pos.	Nation	Player
2	MF	JPN	Satoru Yamagishi (retired)
3	DF	JPN	Kyohei Kuroki (to (Japan) Kagoshima United FC)
10	MF	BRA	Chiquinho (to (Brazil) São Caetano)
16	DF	JPN	Takahiro Yamaguchi (retired)
19	FW	JPN	Yosei Otsu (to (Japan) SC Sagamihara)
21	GK	JPN	Naoto Kamifukumoto (to (Japan) Tokyo Verdy)
25	DF	JPN	Koyo Sato (on loan to (Japan) ReinMeer Aomori)
30	FW	JPN	Tsubasa Yoshihira (on loan to (Japan) Blaublitz Akita)
33	MF	JPN	Jun Suzuki (to (Japan) Avispa Fukuoka, end of loan)
35	DF	JPN	Tatsuya Sakai (to (Japan) Sagan Tosu, end of loan)
42	DF	JPN	Masato Tokida (to (Japan) Vegalta Sendai, end of loan)
—	MF	JPN	Daisuke Sakai (on loan to (Japan) Albirex Niigata)
—	MF	JPN	Kazuki Egashira (on loan to (Japan) Grulla Morioka)

== Yokohama FC ==
In: Note: Flags indicate national team as defined under FIFA eligibility rules; some limited exceptions apply. Players may hold more than one non-FIFA nationality.

No.	Pos.	Nation	Player
9	FW	JPN	Akira Toshima (from (Japan) Machida Zelvia)
13	DF	KOR	Bae Seung-jin (from (South Korea) Seongnam FC)
14	DF	JPN	Kengo Kitazume (from (Japan) JEF United Chiba)
17	MF	JPN	Eijiro Takeda (from (Japan) Shonan Bellmare)
21	GK	JPN	Kaito Yamamoto (on loan from (Japan) JEF United Chiba)
24	MF	JPN	Kazuhito Watanabe (from (Japan) Fagiano Okayama)
30	FW	JPN	Ayumu Tachibana (from Ryutsu Keizai University)
33	DF	JPN	Yasumasa Kawasaki (from (Japan) Sanfrecce Hiroshima, previously on loan)
35	MF	JPN	Daisuke Matsui (from (Poland) Odra Opole)

Out: Note: Flags indicate national team as defined under FIFA eligibility rules; some limited exceptions apply. Players may hold more than one non-FIFA nationality.

No.	Pos.	Nation	Player
5	MF	JPN	Shogo Nishikawa (on loan to (Japan) Tochigi SC)
9	FW	JPN	Tomohiro Tsuda (to (Japan) Nagano Parceiro)
10	MF	JPN	Shinichi Terada (to (Japan) Tochigi SC)
13	MF	JPN	Yosuke Nozaki (to (Japan) Tochigi Uva FC)
17	DF	JPN	Shuma Kusumoto (from (Japan) Kataller Toyama)
21	MF	JPN	Asahi Masuyama (to (Japan) Vissel Kobe, end of loan)
28	MF	JPN	Yota Maejima (on loan to (Japan) Kataller Toyama)
30	DF	JPN	Takanobu Komiyama (retired)
39	FW	JPN	Tetsuya Okubo (to (Japan) Thespakusatsu Gunma)
45	GK	JPN	Takashi Kitano (to (Japan) Gainare Tottori)

== Montedio Yamagata ==
In: Note: Flags indicate national team as defined under FIFA eligibility rules; some limited exceptions apply. Players may hold more than one non-FIFA nationality.

No.	Pos.	Nation	Player
2	DF	BRA	Jairo (from (Iran) Sepahan)
4	DF	JPN	Kai Miki (from (Japan) Roasso Kumamoto)
8	MF	BRA	Álvaro Rodrigues (from (Brazil) AD Confiança)
9	FW	BRA	Felipe Alves (from (Brazil) Tombense)
10	FW	JPN	Yuji Senuma (from (Japan) Shimizu S-Pulse, previously on loan)
16	MF	JPN	Seigo Kobayashi (on loan from (Japan) Vissel Kobe)
19	DF	JPN	Ryota Matsumoto (from (Japan) Machida Zelvia)
21	GK	JPN	Masatoshi Kushibiki (from (Japan) Shimizu S-Pulse)
22	FW	JPN	Shunta Nakamura (from Aomori Yamada High School)
23	DF	JPN	Yuta Kumamoto (from Waseda University)
24	DF	JPN	Kenta Furube (from (Japan) V-Varen Nagasaki)
27	FW	JPN	Shuto Kitagawa (from University of Tsukuba)
35	DF	JPN	Tatsuya Sakai (from (Japan) Sagan Tosu)
40	GK	JPN	Kotaro Iba (from Kyoto Sangyo University)

Out: Note: Flags indicate national team as defined under FIFA eligibility rules; some limited exceptions apply. Players may hold more than one non-FIFA nationality.

No.	Pos.	Nation	Player
2	DF	JPN	Kazuki Segawa (to (Japan) Renofa Yamaguchi)
4	DF	JPN	Hirokazu Usami (to (Japan) Fukushima United FC)
5	DF	JPN	Shunya Suganuma (to (Japan) Gamba Osaka)
8	MF	JPN	Koki Kazama (on loan to (Japan) Thespakusatsu Gunma)
10	MF	JPN	Yuto Suzuki (to (Japan) Kawasaki Frontale)
13	DF	JPN	Tatsuya Ishikawa (retired)
16	MF	JPN	Yuhei Sato (to (Japan) Tokyo Verdy)
19	MF	JPN	Tetsuro Ota (to (Japan) Sagan Tosu, end of loan)
22	DF	KOR	Lee Je-seung (released)
23	GK	JPN	Daiki Tomii (to (Japan) Shonan Bellmare)
24	DF	JPN	Kenji Arabori (to (Japan) Kamatamare Sanuki)
26	FW	JPN	Ayumu Nagato (on loan to (Japan) Thespakusatsu Gunma)
27	DF	JPN	Toshiya Takagi (to (Japan) JEF United Chiba)
30	DF	JPN	Naruki Takahashi (on loan to Japan Soccer College)
32	MF	JPN	Yoichi Naganuma (to (Japan) Sanfrecce Hiroshima, end of loan)
—	GK	JPN	Norihiro Yamagishi (to (Japan) Giravanz Kitakyushu, previously on loan)
—	DF	KOR	Han Ho-gang (to (Japan) Blaublitz Akita, previously on loan)

== Kyoto Sanga ==
In: Note: Flags indicate national team as defined under FIFA eligibility rules; some limited exceptions apply. Players may hold more than one non-FIFA nationality.

No.	Pos.	Nation	Player
2	DF	JPN	Go Iwase (from (Japan) FC Gifu, end of loan)
3	DF	JPN	Masafumi Miyagi (from (Japan) Renofa Yamaguchi)
5	MF	URU	Matías Caseras (on loan from (Uruguay) Plaza Colonia)
8	MF	JPN	Takuya Shigehiro (from Hannan University)
9	FW	URU	Renzo López (on loan from (Uruguay) Plaza Colonia)
11	MF	JPN	Yosuke Yuzawa (from (Japan) Mito HollyHock)
16	FW	JPN	Daiki Numa (from (Japan) Gainare Tottori, end of loan)
17	DF	JPN	Yusuke Muta (from (Japan) FC Imabari, end of loan)
20	MF	BRA	Alexandre (on loan from (Brazil) CA Metropolitano)
24	DF	JPN	Takahiro Masukawa (from (Japan) Consadole Sapporo)
25	MF	JPN	Kota Ogino (from (Japan) Kamatamare Sanuki, end of loan)
27	GK	KOR	Kim Chol-ho (from (South Korea) FC Seoul)
34	GK	JPN	Tomoya Wakahara (promoted from youth ranks)
35	MF	JPN	Shimpei Fukuoka (promoted from youth ranks)
36	MF	JPN	Soichiro Kozuki (promoted from youth ranks)

Out: Note: Flags indicate national team as defined under FIFA eligibility rules; some limited exceptions apply. Players may hold more than one non-FIFA nationality.

No.	Pos.	Nation	Player
1	GK	JPN	Takanori Sugeno (on loan to (Japan) Consadole Sapporo)
2	DF	JPN	Masato Yuzawa (to (Japan) Kashiwa Reysol, end of loan)
3	DF	JPN	Yuji Takahashi (to (Japan) Sagan Tosu)
5	MF	JPN	Kyohei Yoshino (to (Japan) Sanfrecce Hiroshima, end of loan)
8	MF	KOR	Ha Sung-min (to (South Korea) Gyeongnam FC)
9	FW	BEL	Kevin Oris (released)
16	FW	KOR	Lee Yong-jae (to (Japan) Fagiano Okayama)
20	MF	JPN	Shun Ito (to (Japan) Roasso Kumamoto)
23	MF	JPN	Takuya Shimamura (on loan to (Japan) FC Gifu)
24	DF	JPN	Kyohei Uchida (to (Japan) Nagano Parceiro)
25	DF	JPN	Shogo Asada (on loan to (Japan) Kamatamare Sanuki)
28	DF	JPN	Ryusei Saito (to (Japan) Fujieda MYFC)
29	GK	JPN	Tatsunari Nagai (to (Japan) Iwaki FC)
31	FW	JPN	Masashi Oguro (on loan to (Japan) Tochigi SC)
—	DF	JPN	Yuki Onishi (released)
—	FW	JPN	Masatoshi Ishida (on loan to (Japan) Azul Claro Numazu)

== Fagiano Okayama ==
In: Note: Flags indicate national team as defined under FIFA eligibility rules; some limited exceptions apply. Players may hold more than one non-FIFA nationality.

No.	Pos.	Nation	Player
3	DF	JPN	Keita Goto (from (Japan) Matsumoto Yamaga)
4	DF	JPN	Mizuki Hamada (from (Japan) Avispa Fukuoka)
5	DF	JPN	Shigeto Matsuda (from (Japan) Albirex Niigata)
9	FW	KOR	Lee Yong-jae (from (Japan) Kyoto Sanga)
13	GK	JPN	Junki Kanayama (from (Japan) Consadole Sapporo)
14	MF	JPN	Kota Ueda (from (Japan) Júbilo Iwata)
15	MF	JPN	Toshiya Sueyoshi (from (Japan) Avispa Fukuoka)
18	FW	JPN	Kazuki Saito (from (Japan) Júbilo Iwata)
19	MF	JPN	Hayato Nakama (from (Japan) Kamatamare Sanuki)
21	DF	JPN	Kenta Mukuhara (from (Japan) Cerezo Osaka)
26	MF	JPN	Kentaro Matsumoto (from Saga University)
27	MF	KOR	Choi Jung-won (from Konkuk University)
30	FW	JPN	Takuma Takeda (from Tokai Gakuen University)
32	FW	JPN	Tomoya Fukumoto (from Funabashi High School)
33	DF	JPN	Kaito Abe (from Higashi Fukuoka High School)
34	MF	JPN	Carlos Duke (from (Japan) Kawasaki Frontale)
40	GK	KOR	Lee Kyung-tae (from (Japan) FC Ryukyu, end of loan)

Out: Note: Flags indicate national team as defined under FIFA eligibility rules; some limited exceptions apply. Players may hold more than one non-FIFA nationality.

No.	Pos.	Nation	Player
1	GK	JPN	Kazuma Shiina (retired)
3	DF	JPN	Shingo Kukita (to (Japan) Thespakusatsu Gunma)
4	DF	JPN	Tetsushi Kondo (retired)
5	MF	JPN	Kazuhito Watanabe (to (Japan) Yokohama FC)
6	DF	JPN	Tadashi Takeda (to (Japan) FC Gifu)
8	MF	JPN	Hideki Ishige (to (Japan) Shimizu S-Pulse, end of loan)
9	FW	KOR	Kim Jong-min (to (South Korea) Suwon Bluewings, end of loan)
13	GK	JPN	Masatoshi Kushibiki (to (Japan) Shimizu S-Pulse, end of loan)
17	MF	KOR	Park Hyung-jin (to (South Korea) Suwon Bluewings)
18	FW	ARG	Nicolas Orsini (to (Japan) Tokushima Vortis, end of loan)
19	FW	JPN	Eiichi Katayama (to (Japan) Cerezo Osaka)
21	DF	JPN	Akira Kaji (retired)
26	MF	JPN	Soichi Tanaka (to (Japan) Kagoshima United FC)
30	FW	JPN	Yuta Toyokawa (to (Japan) Kashima Antlers, end of loan)
33	DF	KOR	Jang Suk-won (released)
34	FW	JPN	Ryuta Ishikawa (retired)
39	DF	JPN	Kojiro Shinohara (to (Japan) Avispa Fukuoka)
44	GK	JPN	Tadashi Kiwada (retired)

== Mito HollyHock ==
In: Note: Flags indicate national team as defined under FIFA eligibility rules; some limited exceptions apply. Players may hold more than one non-FIFA nationality.

No.	Pos.	Nation	Player
4	DF	JPN	Ndoka Boniface (from Nippon Sport Science University)
5	DF	JPN	Makito Ito (from (Japan) Fujieda MYFC, end of loan)
6	DF	BRA	Diego (on loan from (Brazil) Joinville EC)
8	MF	JPN	Hiroyuki Mae (on loan from (Japan) Consadole Sapporo)
9	FW	BRA	Jefferson Baiano (on loan from (Brazil) Santa Rita)
10	MF	JPN	Yuji Kimura (from (Japan) Tokushima Vortis)
13	MF	JPN	Keita Tanaka (from (Japan) FC Ryukyu, end of loan)
17	DF	JPN	Daisuke Tomita (from (Japan) Tokushima Vortis)
19	MF	JPN	Yuichi Hirano (from Kokushikan University)
21	GK	JPN	Yuto Koizumi (from (Japan) Kashima Antlers, previously on loan)
31	GK	JPN	Ryo Hasegawa (from Funabashi High School)
32	MF	JPN	Atsushi Kurokawa (on loan from (Japan) Omiya Ardija)
35	DF	JPN	Shoki Ohara (promoted from youth ranks)
39	MF	JPN	Ryuya Motoda (from Albirex Niigata Singapore, end of loan)
40	FW	JPN	Takeru Kishimoto (on loan from (Japan) Cerezo Osaka)
50	GK	JPN	Kenya Matsui (from (Japan) Omiya Ardija)

Out: Note: Flags indicate national team as defined under FIFA eligibility rules; some limited exceptions apply. Players may hold more than one non-FIFA nationality.

No.	Pos.	Nation	Player
8	FW	JPN	Ryohei Hayashi (to (Japan) Tokyo Verdy)
11	DF	JPN	Koji Hashimoto (released)
17	MF	JPN	Yosuke Yuzawa (to (Japan) Kyoto Sanga)
19	FW	JPN	Yuki Yamamura (to (Japan) Tochigi Uva FC)
20	DF	JPN	Junya Imase (on loan to (Japan) Kataller Toyama)
21	GK	JPN	Takashi Kasahara (to (Japan) Omiya Ardija)
22	MF	JPN	Kohei Uchida (to (Japan) Tokushima Vortis)
26	MF	JPN	Kazuhiro Sato (to (Japan) Ventforet Kofu)
27	MF	JPN	Shota Saito (to (Japan) Urawa Red Diamonds, end of loan)
32	DF	BRA	Paulao (to (Japan) Consadole Sapporo, end of loan)
35	DF	JPN	Ryusei Saito (to (Japan) Kyoto Sanga, end of loan)
38	FW	JPN	Daizen Maeda (to (Japan) Matsumoto Yamaga, end of loan)
39	MF	JPN	Takafumi Shimizu (to (Japan) Jubilo Iwata, end of loan)
—	GK	JPN	Akihisa Okada (to (Japan) Suzuka Unlimited FC)
—	GK	JPN	Ryo Ishii (on loan to (Japan) Fukushima United FC)
—	DF	JPN	Kazuki Sato (to (Japan) Kataller Toyama, previously on loan)
—	DF	JPN	Takaaki Kinoshita (on loan to (Japan) Fujieda MYFC)
—	FW	JPN	Hiroki Bandai (to (Japan) Nagano Parceiro, previously on loan)
—	FW	JPN	Taisei Kadoguchi (to (Japan) Tokyo Musashino City FC, previously on loan)

== Ehime FC ==
In: Note: Flags indicate national team as defined under FIFA eligibility rules; some limited exceptions apply. Players may hold more than one non-FIFA nationality.

No.	Pos.	Nation	Player
1	GK	JPN	Masahiro Okamoto (on loan from (Japan) JEF United Chiba)
2	DF	JPN	Kosuke Yamazaki (from Meiji University)
5	DF	JPN	Takanori Maeno (from (Japan) Albirex Niigata)
6	MF	JPN	Hideyuki Nozawa (on loan from (Japan) FC Tokyo)
8	DF	JPN	Jun Ando (from (Japan) Matsumoto Yamaga)
10	MF	JPN	Yuta Kamiya (on loan from (Japan) Shonan Bellmare)
14	MF	JPN	Junki Koike (from (Japan) JEF United Chiba, previously on loan)
16	MF	JPN	Hiroto Tanaka (from (Japan) Júbilo Iwata, previously on loan)
24	DF	JPN	Jurato Ikeda (from (Japan) Cerezo Osaka)
25	MF	JPN	Yuji Takeshima (from (Japan) JEF United Chiba)
26	DF	JPN	Shinya Uehara (from (Japan) Consadole Sapporo)
—	MF	JPN	Shuya Iwai (promoted from youth ranks)
—	DF	JPN	Shuma Mihara (promoted from youth ranks)

Out: Note: Flags indicate national team as defined under FIFA eligibility rules; some limited exceptions apply. Players may hold more than one non-FIFA nationality.

No.	Pos.	Nation	Player
1	GK	JPN	Shunta Awaka (to (Japan) Consadole Sapporo, end of loan)
2	DF	JPN	Nobuhisa Urata (to (Japan) Matsumoto Yamaga)
5	MF	JPN	Ibuki Fujita (to (Japan) Matsumoto Yamaga)
6	MF	JPN	Kohei Mihara (to (Japan) Vonds Ichihara)
8	MF	JPN	Shuto Kojima (to (Japan) JEF United Chiba)
9	MF	JPN	Kodai Yasuda (to (Japan) Nankatsu SC)
14	MF	JPN	Kosuke Shirai (to (Japan) Consadole Sapporo)
19	DF	JPN	Shuhei Hotta (on loan to (Japan) Blaublitz Akita)
22	DF	JPN	Yuki Fukaya (retired)
24	MF	CHN	Ju Feng (to (China) Guangzhou Evergrande, end of loan)
40	FW	JPN	Ryuga Suzuki (to (Japan) Tochigi Uva FC)

== Machida Zelvia ==
In: Note: Flags indicate national team as defined under FIFA eligibility rules; some limited exceptions apply. Players may hold more than one non-FIFA nationality.

No.	Pos.	Nation	Player
1	GK	JPN	Koki Fukui (from Nippon Sport Science University)
4	DF	KOR	Jung Han-cheol (from Sungkyunkwan University)
7	MF	JPN	Koki Sugimori (on loan from (Japan) Nagoya Grampus)
17	DF	JPN	Koki Shimosaka (on loan from (Japan) Avispa Fukuoka)
19	MF	JPN	Shuta Doi (from Meiji University)
20	FW	MKD	Dorian Babunski (from (Japan) Kagoshima United FC, end of loan)
22	DF	JPN	Takuya Hashiguchi (on loan from (Japan) Kashiwa Reysol)
23	DF	JPN	Ryusuke Sakai (on loan from (Japan) Nagoya Grampus)
24	MF	PER	Frank Romero (footballer) (from (Japan) Albirex Niigata)
25	DF	JPN	Masaya Kojima (on loan from (Japan) Vegalta Sendai)
28	FW	JPN	Ryu Joseph Hashimura (promoted from youth ranks)
35	DF	JPN	Naoki Otani (from (Japan) Sanfrecce Hiroshima, previously on loan)

Out: Note: Flags indicate national team as defined under FIFA eligibility rules; some limited exceptions apply. Players may hold more than one non-FIFA nationality.

No.	Pos.	Nation	Player
1	GK	JPN	Kempei Usui (to (Japan) Shimizu S-Pulse, end of loan)
4	DF	MNE	Boris Tatar (released)
7	FW	JPN	Makito Yoshida (to (Japan) JEF United Chiba, end of loan)
8	MF	JPN	Tatsuya Yazawa (to (Japan) SC Sagamihara)
17	FW	JPN	Junki Endo (to (Japan) Fujieda MYFC)
19	DF	JPN	Ryota Matsumoto (to (Japan) Montedio Yamagata)
22	DF	JPN	Satoru Hoshino (released)
23	FW	JPN	Akira Toshima (to (Japan) Yokohama FC)
24	DF	PRK	Kim Song-gi (to (Japan) Fujieda MYFC)
25	DF	JPN	Shigeto Masuda (to (Japan) Albirex Niigata, end of loan)
39	FW	JPN	Kentaro Shigematsu (to (Japan) Kamatamare Sanuki)
—	DF	JPN	Tomoya Fukuda (to (Japan) Grulla Morioka, previously on loan)

== Zweigen Kanazawa ==
In: Note: Flags indicate national team as defined under FIFA eligibility rules; some limited exceptions apply. Players may hold more than one non-FIFA nationality.

No.	Pos.	Nation	Player
2	DF	JPN	Norimichi Yamamoto (from Biwako Seikei Sport College)
5	DF	BRA	Allan (from (Japan) Kamatamare Sanuki)
7	MF	JPN	Shohei Kiyohara (from (Japan) Cerezo Osaka)
8	MF	JPN	Kenta Yamafuji (from (Japan) Giravanz Kitakyushu, end of loan)
16	DF	JPN	Shunya Mori (from Juntendo University)
17	FW	JPN	Taiki Kato (from (Japan) Renofa Yamaguchi)
25	FW	JPN	Ryoya Taniguchi (promoted from youth ranks)
26	MF	JPN	Keita Fujimura (on loan from (Japan) Vegalta Sendai)
29	FW	BRA	Rodrigo Maranhão (from (Thailand) Sukhothai FC)
32	MF	JPN	Raisei Shimazu (from Kokoku High School)
33	MF	JPN	Takahide Umebachi (from (Japan) Kashima Antlers)

Out: Note: Flags indicate national team as defined under FIFA eligibility rules; some limited exceptions apply. Players may hold more than one non-FIFA nationality.

No.	Pos.	Nation	Player
2	DF	JPN	Shinya Awatari (to (Japan) Fujieda MYFC)
5	DF	JPN	Kosuke Ota (to (Japan) FC Imabari)
10	MF	JPN	Keiya Nakami (to (Japan) Sagan Tosu, end of loan)
20	DF	JPN	Keisuke Minegishi (to (Japan) Azul Claro Numazu)
22	MF	JPN	Yasuhito Tomita (to (Japan) Azul Claro Numazu)
24	MF	JPN	Yuhei Otsuki (retired)
25	MF	JPN	Yusuke Hoshino (to (Japan) Gainare Tottori)
29	MF	KOR	Kim Tea-sung (released)
31	GK	JPN	Yoshinobu Harada (to (Japan) Tochigi Uva FC)
40	MF	JPN	Masaru Akiba (retired)
—	MF	JPN	Hiroyuki Furuta (to (Japan) Blaublitz Akita, previously on loan)
—	FW	JPN	Shoma Mizunaga (to (Japan) Tegevajaro Miyazaki)
—	FW	JPN	Shogo Omachi (to (Japan) Honda FC)

== FC Gifu ==
In: Note: Flags indicate national team as defined under FIFA eligibility rules; some limited exceptions apply. Players may hold more than one non-FIFA nationality.

No.	Pos.	Nation	Player
1	GK	JPN	Michiya Okamoto (from Nihon University)
3	DF	JPN	Tadashi Takeda (from (Japan) Fagiano Okayama)
6	MF	JPN	Shohei Mishima (from Chuo University)
9	MF	JPN	Yuya Yamagishi (from (Japan) Thespakusatsu Gunma)
10	FW	NZL	Ryan De Vries (from (New Zealand) Auckland City FC)
16	DF	JPN	Takayuki Fukumura (from (Japan) Shimizu S-Pulse, previously on loan)
17	DF	JPN	Takumi Fujitani (from Kobe Gakuin University)
18	FW	JPN	Daichi Ishikawa (from Toin University of Yokohama)
20	MF	KOR	Woo Sang-ho (from (South Korea) Daegu FC)
21	GK	JPN	Yusuke Harada (from (Germany) Bonner SC)
22	MF	JPN	Takuya Shimamura (on loan from (Japan) Kyoto Sanga)
26	MF	JPN	Yoichi Naganuma (on loan from (Japan) Sanfrecce Hiroshima)
27	DF	JPN	Osamu Henry Iyoha (on loan from (Japan) Sanfrecce Hiroshima)
30	MF	JPN	Kensei Nakashima (from (Japan) Yokohama F. Marinos, previously on loan)
31	MF	JPN	Kota Miyamoto (from (Japan) Shimizu S-Pulse)

Out: Note: Flags indicate national team as defined under FIFA eligibility rules; some limited exceptions apply. Players may hold more than one non-FIFA nationality.

No.	Pos.	Nation	Player
1	GK	JPN	Satoshi Tokizawa (to (Japan) Thespakusatsu Gunma)
6	MF	ESP	Sisinio (to (Japan) Tokushima Vortis)
9	FW	BRA	Cristian (released)
10	MF	JPN	Yoshihiro Shoji (to (Japan) Vegalta Sendai)
17	DF	JPN	Yuki Omoto (to (Japan) Tokushima Vortis)
18	FW	JPN	Ryo Takiya (to (Japan) Kataller Toyama)
20	DF	JPN	Jun Suzuki (to (Japan) Nara Club)
21	GK	JPN	Yoshinari Takagi (retired)
22	MF	JPN	Kohei Yamada (to (Japan) Nara Club)
26	DF	JPN	Go Iwase (to (Japan) Kyoto Sanga, end of loan)
27	DF	BRA	Henik (to (Japan) Tochigi SC)
41	DF	JPN	Kentaro Kai (on loan to (Japan) Gainare Tottori)

== Kamatamare Sanuki ==
In: Note: Flags indicate national team as defined under FIFA eligibility rules; some limited exceptions apply. Players may hold more than one non-FIFA nationality.

No.	Pos.	Nation	Player
2	DF	KOR	Park Chan-yong (from (Japan) Renofa Yamaguchi)
4	DF	JPN	Kenji Arabori (from (Japan) Montedio Yamagata)
5	DF	JPN	Shogo Asada (on loan from (Japan) Kyoto Sanga)
14	MF	JPN	Takumi Sasaki (on loan from (Japan) Vegalta Sendai)
16	GK	KOR	Song Young-min (from (Japan) V-Varen Nagasaki)
17	MF	JPN	Wataru Sasaki (from (Japan) FC Tokyo)
18	MF	JPN	Kenshiro Suzuki (from Kansai University)
19	FW	JPN	Kentaro Shigematsu (from (Japan) Machida Zelvia)
26	MF	JPN	Sota Hamaguchi (promoted from youth ranks)

Out: Note: Flags indicate national team as defined under FIFA eligibility rules; some limited exceptions apply. Players may hold more than one non-FIFA nationality.

No.	Pos.	Nation	Player
4	DF	JPN	Kazuya Sunamori (to (Japan) Azul Claro Numazu)
8	MF	JPN	Tomoya Osawa (retired)
11	MF	JPN	Kenji Baba (to (Japan) Oita Trinita)
14	DF	BRA	Allan (to (Japan) Zweigen Kanazawa)
15	MF	JPN	Taishi Tsunada (to (Japan) FC Tokushima)
16	GK	JPN	Shohei Matsubara (to (Japan) Thespakusatsu Gunma)
17	DF	KOR	Ri Yong-jik (to (Japan) Tokyo Verdy)
18	MF	JPN	Fumiya Tamaki (to (Japan) FC TIAMO Hirakata)
19	MF	JPN	Hayato Nakama (to (Japan) Fagiano Okayama)
20	MF	JPN	Kota Ogino (to (Japan) Kyoto Sanga, end of loan)
26	MF	JPN	Shohei Yamamoto (to (Japan) Amitie SC Kyoto)
27	DF	KOR	Yoon Seon-ho (released)
30	DF	BRA	Evson (to (Saudi Arabia) Al-Faisaly FC)
33	FW	JPN	Ryosuke Kijima (to (Japan) FC Maruyasu Okazaki)

== Renofa Yamaguchi ==
In: Note: Flags indicate national team as defined under FIFA eligibility rules; some limited exceptions apply. Players may hold more than one non-FIFA nationality.

No.	Pos.	Nation	Player
2	DF	JPN	Keisuke Tsuboi (from (Japan) Shonan Bellmare)
6	DF	JPN	Takayuki Mae (from (Japan) Consadole Sapporo, previously on loan)
7	MF	JPN	Junya Osaki (from (Japan) Tokushima Vortis)
13	DF	JPN	Takumi Kusumoto (from Tokyo International University)
16	DF	JPN	Kazuki Segawa (from (Japan) Montedio Yamagata)
18	FW	JPN	Daisuke Takagi (on loan from (Japan) Tokyo Verdy)
19	FW	JPN	Ado Onaiwu (on loan from (Japan) Urawa Red Diamonds)
24	FW	JPN	Keita Yamashita (from Fukuoka University)
30	DF	KOR	Min Kyung-jun (from Chongju University)
32	MF	JPN	Mitsuru Maruoka (on loan from (Japan) Cerezo Osaka)
41	MF	JPN	Ryuji Hirota (from (Japan) Gainare Tottori)
—	GK	JPN	Eisuke Fujishima (from (Japan) Sagan Tosu)
—	MF	JPN	Issei Takahashi (on loan from (Japan) JEF United Chiba)

Out: Note: Flags indicate national team as defined under FIFA eligibility rules; some limited exceptions apply. Players may hold more than one non-FIFA nationality.

No.	Pos.	Nation	Player
2	DF	JPN	Masafumi Miyagi (to (Japan) Kyoto Sanga)
16	DF	KOR	Park Chan-yong (to (Japan) Kamatamare Sanuki)
17	FW	JPN	Taiki Kato (to (Japan) Zweigen Kanazawa)
19	DF	JPN	Yuji Hoshi (to (Japan) Oita Trinita)
22	FW	JPN	Masashi Wada (to (Japan) Yokohama F. Marinos, end of loan)
24	MF	ARG	Marcelo Vidal (released)
28	FW	ARG	Leonardo Ramos (to (Mexico) Cafetaleros de Tapachula)
30	DF	ARG	Abel Luciatti (released)

== Roasso Kumamoto ==
In: Note: Flags indicate national team as defined under FIFA eligibility rules; some limited exceptions apply. Players may hold more than one non-FIFA nationality.

No.	Pos.	Nation	Player
11	FW	JPN	Yusuke Minagawa (on loan from (Japan) Sanfrecce Hiroshima)
13	DF	JPN	Atsuto Tatara (from (Japan) JEF United Chiba)
15	DF	JPN	Takeshi Aoki (from (Japan) Sagan Tosu)
17	FW	JPN	Tsubasa Sano (from Albirex Niigata Singapore)
24	DF	JPN	Yuko Takase (from (Japan) Omiya Ardija)
25	MF	JPN	Keisuke Tanabe (from (Japan) FC Ryukyu)
29	DF	JPN	Mikiya Eto (promoted from youth ranks)
31	MF	JPN	Shun Ito (from (Japan) Kyoto Sanga)
33	MF	JPN	Kodai Sakamoto (from Chukyo University)
37	MF	JPN	Yuki Ikeya (from Chuo University)
39	DF	JPN	Shoto Suzuki (from (Japan) Giravanz Kitakyushu, end of loan)

Out: Note: Flags indicate national team as defined under FIFA eligibility rules; some limited exceptions apply. Players may hold more than one non-FIFA nationality.

No.	Pos.	Nation	Player
8	FW	BRA	Morbeck (to (Japan) Júbilo Iwata)
11	FW	BRA	Gustavo (to (Vietnam) Hồ Chí Minh City F.C.)
13	DF	JPN	Kai Miki (to (Japan) Montedio Yamagata)
15	MF	JPN	Ryota Tanabe (to (Japan) Nagoya Grampus, end of loan)
17	MF	JPN	Yasuaki Okamoto (retired)
24	MF	JPN	Yuji Kimura (to (Japan) Tokushima Vortis, end of loan)
26	DF	JPN	Yuya Mitsunaga (to (Japan) Fujieda MYFC)
37	DF	BRA	Júnior (released)
39	MF	JPN	Shintaro Shimada (to (Japan) Omiya Ardija)
41	MF	JPN	Minoru Suganuma (released)
—	DF	JPN	Jun Sonoda (to (Japan) Blaublitz Akita)
—	MF	JPN	Masanobu Komaki (to (Japan) Fujieda MYFC)
—	FW	JPN	Ryuichi Hirashige (to (Japan) Thespakusatsu Gunma)

== Tochigi SC ==
In: Note: Flags indicate national team as defined under FIFA eligibility rules; some limited exceptions apply. Players may hold more than one non-FIFA nationality.

No.	Pos.	Nation	Player
3	MF	JPN	Shogo Nishikawa (on loan from (Japan) Yokohama FC)
5	DF	BRA	Henik (from (Japan) FC Gifu)
9	FW	JPN	Masashi Oguro (on loan from (Japan) Kyoto Sanga)
27	DF	JPN	Ryosuke Hisadomi (from (Japan) Fujieda MYFC)
28	DF	JPN	Hayato Nukui (from (Japan) Cerezo Osaka)
33	GK	JPN	Kei Ishikawa (from (Japan) Vegalta Sendai)
37	MF	JPN	Akira Hamashita (from Sanno Institute of Management)
40	MF	JPN	Shinichi Terada (from (Japan) Yokohama FC)
—	FW	JPN	Koki Oshima (from (Japan) Kashiwa Reysol)

Out: Note: Flags indicate national team as defined under FIFA eligibility rules; some limited exceptions apply. Players may hold more than one non-FIFA nationality.

No.	Pos.	Nation	Player
4	DF	JPN	Kenta Hirose (to (Japan) Shonan Bellmare, end of loan)
5	DF	JPN	Kei Omoto (to (Japan) Blaublitz Akita)
20	FW	JPN	Takumu Fujinuma (to (Japan) Omiya Ardija, end of loan)
23	GK	JPN	Shuhei Kawata (on loan to (Japan) Fujieda MYFC)
—	DF	JPN	Seiji Kawakami (on loan to (Japan) Fujieda MYFC)
—	DF	JPN	Masashi Nito (released)
—	DF	JPN	Takamasa Taneoka (to (Japan) Fujieda MYFC)
—	MF	JPN	Shuga Arai (on loan to (Japan) Blancdieu Hirosaki)
—	MF	JPN	Ren Yamamoto (on loan to (Japan) Blancdieu Hirosaki)
—	FW	JPN	Ryuta Honjo (on loan to (Japan) Blancdieu Hirosaki)
—	FW	JPN	Tatsumi Sotome (on loan to (Japan) Blancdieu Hirosaki)
—	FW	JPN	Koki Takenaka (to (Japan) Tochigi Uva FC)
—	FW	JPN	Koki Oshima (on loan to (Japan) Thespakusatsu Gunma)
