= 2019 J2 League =

Meiji Yasuda J2 League
- Season: 2019
- Champions: Kashiwa Reysol; 2nd J2 title 3rd D2 title
- Promoted: Kashiwa Reysol; Yokohama FC
- Relegated: Kagoshima United; FC Gifu
- Matches: 462
- Goals: 1,197 (2.59 per match)
- Highest attendance: 20,486; Niigata vs. Kashiwa (9 March)
- Lowest attendance: 2,111; Yokohama vs. Tokushima (15 June)
- Average attendance: 7,176

The 2019 Meiji Yasuda J2 League (Japanese: 2019 明治安田生命J2リーグ, Hepburn: 2019 Meiji Yasuda Seimei J2 Rīgu) season was the 48th season of the second-tier club football in Japan and the 21st season since the establishment of J2 League.

== Clubs ==
Locations of the 2019 J2 League teams

Following eight successful seasons, Kashiwa Reysol bid farewell to the first division. A similar fate befell V-Varen Nagasaki, who returned to J2 after their inaugural season in the top tier. Matsumoto Yamaga and Oita Trinita, having earned promotion, filled their vacancies, while Tokyo Verdy missed out on promotion after losing the play-off against Júbilo Iwata. In addition, four teams experienced changes in their league status: Roasso Kumamoto and Kamatamare Sanuki exited J2, paving the way for the newly-promoted FC Ryukyu and Kagoshima United, both set to embark on their inaugural J2 season.

The participating clubs are listed in the following table:

Club name	Home town(s)	Stadium	Capacity	Last season
Albirex Niigata	Niigata & Seirō, Niigata	Denka Big Swan Stadium	42,300	J2 (16th)
Avispa Fukuoka	Fukuoka City, Fukuoka	Level5 Stadium	22,563	J2 (7th)
Ehime FC	All cities/towns in Ehime (Note: centering on Matsuyama)	Ningineer Stadium	20,000	J2 (18th)
Fagiano Okayama	All cities/towns in Okayama (Note: centering on Okayama, Kurashiki, Tsuyama)	City Light Stadium	20,000	J2 (15th)
FC Gifu	All cities/towns in Gifu (Note: centering on Gifu)	Gifu Nagaragawa Stadium	26,109	J2 (20th)
JEF United Chiba	Chiba & Ichihara, Chiba	Fukuda Denshi Arena	18,500	J2 (14th)
Kashiwa Reysol	Chiba Prefecture	Sankyo Frontier Kashiwa Stadium	15,349	Relegated from J1 (17th)
Kyoto Sanga	Southwestern cities/towns in Kyoto (Note: Kyoto, Uji, Joyo, Kyotanabe, Muko, Nagaokakyo, Kizugawa, Kameoka, Nantan, Kyotanba)	Kyoto Nishikyogoku Athletic Stadium	20,588	J2 (19th)
Machida Zelvia	Machida, Tokyo	Machida Athletic Stadium	10,600	J2 (4th)
Mito HollyHock	Mito, Ibaraki	K's denki Stadium Mito	12,000	J2 (10th)
Montedio Yamagata	All cities/towns in Yamagata (Note: centering on Yamagata, Tendo, Tsuruoka)	ND Soft Stadium	20,315	J2 (12th)
Omiya Ardija	Saitama, Saitama	NACK5 Stadium Omiya	15,500	J2 (5th)
Renofa Yamaguchi	All cities/towns in Yamaguchi (Note: centering on Yamaguchi, Shimonoseki, Sanyoonoda, Ube)	Yamaguchi Ishin Park Stadium	20,000	J2 (8th)
Tochigi SC	Utsunomiya, Tochigi	Tochigi Green Stadium	18,025	J2 (17th)
Tokushima Vortis	All cities/towns in Tokushima (Note: centering on Tokushima, Naruto, Mima, Matsushige, Itano, Aizumi, Kitajima)	Pocarisweat Stadium	20,441	J2 (11th)
V-Varen Nagasaki	Nagasaki Prefecture	Nagasaki Athletic Stadium	20,246	Relegated from J1 (18th)
Ventforet Kofu	All Yamanashi Prefecture (Note: centering on Kofu and Nirasaki)	Yamanashi Chuo Bank Stadium	17,000	J2 (9th)
Tokyo Verdy	All cities/towns in Tokyo	Ajinomoto Stadium	49,970	J2 (6th)
Yokohama FC	Yokohama, Kanagawa	Nippatsu Mitsuzawa Stadium	15,454	J2 (3rd)
Zweigen Kanazawa	Kanazawa, Ishikawa	Ishikawa Kanazawa Stadium	20,000	J2 (13th)
FC Ryukyu	Okinawa	Tapic Kenso Hiyagon Stadium	25,000	Promoted from J3 (champions)
Kagoshima United FC	Kagoshima	Shiranami Stadium	19,934	Promoted from J3 (2nd)

=== Personnel and kits ===
Club	Manager	Captain	Kit manufacturer
Albirex Niigata	(Japan) Kazuaki Yoshinaga	(Japan) Masaru Kato	Adidas
Avispa Fukuoka	(Japan) Kiyokazu Kudo	(Japan) Jun Suzuki	Yonex
Ehime FC	(Japan) Kenta Kawai	(Japan) Go Nishida	Mizuno
Fagiano Okayama	(Japan) Kenji Arima	(Japan) Kohei Kiyama	Penalty
FC Gifu	(Japan) Takeshi Oki	(Japan) Masanori Abe	New Balance
FC Ryukyu	(Japan) Yasuhiro Higuchi	(Japan) Kazumasa Uesato	sfida
JEF United Chiba	(Japan) Atsuhiko Ejiri	(Japan) Yūto Satō	Kappa
Kagoshima United FC	(North Korea) Kim Jong-song	(Japan) Shuto Nakahara	Puma
Kashiwa Reysol	(Brazil) Nelsinho Baptista	(Japan) Hidekazu Otani	Yonex
Kyoto Sanga	(Japan) Ichizo Nakata	(Japan) Takumi Miyayoshi	Puma
Machida Zelvia	(Japan) Naoki Soma	(Japan) Yudai Inoue	SVOLME
Mito HollyHock	(Japan) Shigetoshi Hasebe	(Japan) Junya Hosokawa	GAViC
Montedio Yamagata	(Japan) Takashi Kiyama	(Japan) Takumi Yamada	Penalty
Omiya Ardija	(Japan) Takuya Takagi	(Japan) Genki Omae	Under Armour
Renofa Yamaguchi	(Japan) Masahiro Shimoda	(Japan) Hidetoshi Miyuki	Finta
Tochigi SC	(Japan) Kazuaki Tasaka	(Japan) Kotaro Fujiwara	ATHLETA
Tokushima Vortis	(Spain) Ricardo Rodríguez	(Japan) Ken Iwao	Mizuno
V-Varen Nagasaki	(Japan) Makoto Teguramori	(Japan) Masato Kurogi	Hummel
Ventforet Kofu	(Japan) Akira Ito	(Japan) Yuta Koide	Mizuno
Tokyo Verdy	(Japan) Hideki Nagai	(Japan) Naoya Kondo	ATHLETA
Yokohama FC	(Japan) Takahiro Shimotaira	(Japan) Yuta Minami	SOCCER JUNKY
Zweigen Kanazawa	(Japan) Masaaki Yanagishita	(Japan) Tomonobu Hiroi	Adidas

=== Managerial changes ===
Team	Outgoing manager	Date of vacancy	Incoming manager	Date of appointment
JEF United Chiba	(Argentina) Juan Esnáider	17 April 2019	(Japan) Atsuhiko Ejiri	18 April 2019
Albirex Niigata	(Japan) Koichiro Katafuchi	14 April 2019	(Japan) Kazuaki Yoshinaga	14 April 2019
Yokohama FC	(Brazil) Edson Tavares	14 May 2019	(Japan) Takahiro Shimotaira	14 May 2019
Avispa Fukuoka	(Italy) Fabio Pecchia	3 June 2019	(Japan) Kiyokazu Kudo	3 June 2019
FC Gifu	(Japan) Takeshi Oki	16 June 2019	(Japan) Makoto Kitano	18 June 2019
Tokyo Verdy	(England) Gary White	17 July 2019	(Japan) Hideki Nagai	17 July 2019

== Foreign players ==
The total number of foreign players is limitless, but clubs can only register up to five foreign players for a single match-day squad. Players from J.League partner nations (Thailand, Vietnam, Myanmar, Malaysia, Cambodia, Singapore, Iran and Qatar) are exempt from these restrictions.

Players in bold are players who join midway through the competition.

Club	Player 1	Player 2	Player 3	Player 4	Player 5	Player 6	Player 7
Albirex Niigata	(Brazil) Cauê	(Brazil) Franci	(Brazil) Leonardo	(Brazil) Paulão	(Brazil) Samuel Santos	(Brazil) Silvinho	(South Korea) Cho Young-cheol
Avispa Fukuoka	(Colombia) Félix Micolta	(South Korea) Won Du-jae	(Spain) Jon Ander Serantes	(South Korea) Yang Dong-hyen			
Ehime FC	(Austria) Mladen Jutrić	(South Korea) Park Seong-su	(South Korea) Woo Sang-ho				
Fagiano Okayama	(Brazil) Léo Mineiro	(Malaysia) Hadi Fayyadh	(South Korea) Choi Jung-won	(South Korea) Lee Kyung-tae	(South Korea) Lee Yong-jae	(South Korea) Yu Yong-hyeon	
FC Gifu	(Brazil) **Junior Barros**	(Brazil) Michael	(Spain) Víctor Ibáñez	(Gabon) Frédéric Bulot	(Germany) Jan-Ole Sievers	(South Korea) Ham Yeong-jun	(New Zealand) Ryan De Vries
JEF United Chiba	(Australia) Jason Geria	(Brazil) Alan Pinheiro	(Brazil) Hebert	(Brazil) Kléber	(Venezuela) Williams Velásquez		
Kashiwa Reysol	(Brazil) Cristiano	(Brazil) Gabriel	(Brazil) **Júnior Santos**	(Brazil) **Matheus Sávio**	(Brazil) Richardson	(Kenya) Michael Olunga	
Kyoto Sanga	(Brazil) Juninho	(Brazil) Renan Mota					
Machida Zelvia	(North Macedonia) Dorian Babunski	(North Korea) Ri Han-jae	(Peru) Romero Frank	(South Korea) Jeong Chung-geun			
Mito HollyHock	(Brazil) Jo	(Brazil) **Lelêu**					
Montedio Yamagata	(Brazil) Alvaro	(Brazil) Jefferson Baiano	(Brazil) Rodolfo				
Omiya Ardija	(North Macedonia) David Babunski	(Spain) Juanma	(Sweden) Robin Simović				
Renofa Yamaguchi	(Brazil) Renan	(Uzbekistan) Dostonbek Tursunov					
Tochigi SC	(Brazil) Henik	(Brazil) Mendes	(Brazil) **Yuri**	(South Korea) Yoo Hyun	(South Korea) **Lee Rae-jun**		
Tokushima Vortis	(Brazil) Diego	(Netherlands) Jordy Buijs	(Spain) Sisi	(Thailand) Chakkit Laptrakul	(Uzbekistan) Zabikhillo Urinboev		
Tokyo Verdy	(Brazil) **Jaílton Paraíba**	(Brazil) **Klebinho**	(Brazil) Leandro	(Brazil) Walmerson	(North Korea) Ri Yong-jik	(Serbia) Nemanja Kojić	(South Korea) **Kang Soo-il**
V-Varen Nagasaki	(Brazil) **Caio César**	(Colombia) **Víctor Ibarbo**	(South Korea) Lee Jong-ho	(South Korea) Lee Sang-min			
Ventforet Kofu	(Brazil) **Allano**	(Brazil) Dudú	(Brazil) Éder Lima	(Nigeria) Peter Utaka			
Yokohama FC	(Brazil) Leandro Domingues	(Netherlands) Calvin Jong-a-Pin	(Norway) Ibba Laajab				
Zweigen Kanazawa	(Brazil) Allan	(Costa Rica) Giovanni Clunie					
FC Ryukyu	(Brazil) **Ramon**	(Costa Rica) Danny Carvajal	(North Korea) Kim Song-sun				
Kagoshima United	(Brazil) **Lucão**	(Brazil) Nildo	(North Korea) Han Yong-thae	(South Korea) Ahn Joon-soo			

== League table ==
Pos	Team	Pld	W	D	L	GF	GA	GD	Pts	Promotion, qualification or relegation
1	Kashiwa Reysol (C, P)	42	25	9	8	85	33	+52	84	Promotion to 2020 J1 League
2	Yokohama FC (P)	42	23	10	9	66	40	+26	79	Promotion to 2020 J1 League
3	Omiya Ardija	42	20	15	7	62	40	+22	75	Qualification for promotion play-offs (Note: Only teams that meet J1 license criteria can participate in promotion play-offs. If one or more teams fail to meet the criteria, only eligible teams that finished 3rd to 6th will participate and no replacement teams will be added.)
4	Tokushima Vortis	42	21	10	11	67	45	+22	73	Qualification for promotion play-offs
5	Ventforet Kofu	42	20	11	11	64	40	+24	71	Qualification for promotion play-offs
6	Montedio Yamagata	42	20	10	12	59	40	+19	70	Qualification for promotion play-offs
7	Mito HollyHock	42	19	13	10	56	37	+19	70	
8	Kyoto Sanga	42	19	11	12	59	56	+3	68	
9	Fagiano Okayama	42	18	11	13	49	47	+2	65	
10	Albirex Niigata	42	17	11	14	71	52	+19	62	
11	Zweigen Kanazawa	42	15	16	11	58	46	+12	61	
12	V-Varen Nagasaki	42	17	5	20	57	61	−4	56	
13	Tokyo Verdy	42	14	13	15	59	59	0	55	
14	FC Ryukyu	42	13	10	19	57	80	−23	49	
15	Renofa Yamaguchi	42	13	8	21	54	70	−16	47	
16	Avispa Fukuoka	42	12	8	22	39	62	−23	44	
17	JEF United Chiba	42	10	13	19	46	64	−18	43	
18	Machida Zelvia	42	9	16	17	36	59	−23	43	
19	Ehime FC	42	12	6	24	46	62	−16	42	
20	Tochigi SC	42	8	16	18	33	53	−20	40	
21	Kagoshima United (R)	42	11	7	24	41	73	−32	40	Relegation to 2020 J3 League (Note: Direct exchange between J2 and J3 is subject to eligibility of J2-licensed teams in top 2 of 2019 J3 League.)
22	FC Gifu (R)	42	7	9	26	33	78	−45	30	Relegation to 2020 J3 League

Source: Meiji Yasuda J2 League
Rules for classification: 1) Points; 2) Goal difference; 3) Goals scored
(C) Champions; (P) Promoted; (R) Relegated

== Positions by round ==
Team ╲ Round	1	2	3	4	5	6	7	8	9	10	11	12	13	14	15	16	17	18	19	20	21	22	23	24	25	26	27	28	29	30	31	32	33	34	35	36	37	38	39	40	41	42
Kashiwa Reysol	4	3	3	2	2	4	3	4	4	5	5	7	6	6	6	7	7	7	6	5	3	3	2	2	1	1	1	1	1	1	1	1	1	1	1	1	1	1	1	1	1	1
Yokohama FC	18	21	17	19	13	18	12	12	15	12	12	14	14	12	13	12	11	14	14	13	12	9	8	7	6	4	5	4	4	2	2	3	3	3	3	4	3	2	3	2	2	2
Omiya Ardija	8	15	9	13	16	10	7	7	3	2	3	3	3	3	3	5	3	2	2	2	5	4	5	5	4	3	3	2	3	4	5	6	5	2	2	3	4	3	2	3	3	3
Tokushima Vortis	16	11	14	17	17	15	9	11	11	14	14	10	12	14	16	14	12	11	10	9	9	11	10	12	9	11	12	10	9	9	8	9	9	9	9	8	7	5	5	6	5	4
Ventforet Kofu	8	4	4	3	3	3	1	2	5	3	4	4	7	4	4	3	4	4	4	6	6	6	7	9	8	7	7	7	7	7	7	8	8	8	6	7	9	8	8	7	6	5
Montedio Yamagata	22	12	6	5	5	5	5	1	2	4	2	2	1	1	2	1	2	1	1	1	1	2	4	4	5	6	4	6	5	6	4	2	2	4	4	2	2	4	4	4	4	6
Mito HollyHock	5	1	2	4	4	2	2	3	1	1	1	1	2	2	1	2	1	3	3	3	4	5	3	3	3	5	6	5	6	5	3	5	4	6	7	5	6	6	6	4	8	7
Kyoto Sanga	8	6	5	8	7	7	11	8	7	9	9	6	5	5	5	4	5	5	5	4	2	1	1	1	2	2	2	3	2	3	6	4	6	5	5	6	5	9	9	8	7	8
Fagiano Okayama	18	12	15	10	6	6	10	10	11	8	8	11	12	11	11	10	8	8	9	11	10	7	6	6	7	8	9	9	10	10	9	7	7	7	8	9	8	7	7	9	9	9
Albirex Niigata	8	5	8	6	8	13	8	9	10	11	10	8	10	13	15	16	14	13	13	12	11	12	13	13	13	9	10	12	13	13	13	13	13	12	12	11	12	11	11	10	11	10
Zweigen Kanazawa	8	16	19	11	15	9	6	6	8	7	6	5	4	7	8	8	9	9	7	8	7	8	11	10	11	10	8	8	8	8	10	10	10	11	11	12	10	10	10	11	10	11
V-Varen Nagasaki	5	7	10	14	11	17	20	20	13	10	10	12	9	8	7	6	6	6	8	7	8	10	9	8	10	12	11	13	12	11	11	11	11	10	10	10	11	12	12	12	12	12
Tokyo Verdy	18	20	16	18	18	14	15	16	17	18	16	13	11	10	10	11	13	12	12	10	14	13	12	11	12	13	13	11	11	12	12	12	12	13	13	13	13	13	13	13	13	13
FC Ryukyu	1	2	1	1	1	1	4	5	6	6	7	9	8	9	9	9	10	10	11	14	13	14	14	14	15	17	15	16	16	19	15	16	15	14	15	15	15	15	15	15	14	14
Renofa Yamaguchi	17	22	12	16	21	20	21	21	19	15	17	20	19	20	21	20	20	19	17	16	15	15	15	15	16	14	16	14	15	15	16	14	14	15	14	14	14	14	14	14	15	15
Avispa Fukuoka	21	17	20	22	20	22	18	17	20	17	18	18	20	21	19	18	21	21	21	21	21	19	21	19	19	19	18	19	19	17	19	18	18	18	18	18	18	18	18	18	18	16
JEF United Chiba	8	18	22	21	22	19	13	15	16	19	19	15	17	15	14	15	16	15	15	18	18	17	16	16	14	15	17	17	17	16	18	17	17	17	17	17	17	17	17	16	16	17
Machida Zelvia	5	14	18	20	14	8	14	14	9	13	13	16	15	16	12	13	15	16	16	15	16	16	17	17	18	18	19	20	18	18	17	19	19	19	19	19	19	19	19	19	19	18
Ehime FC	8	7	11	9	10	16	19	13	14	16	15	17	21	17	17	19	17	17	19	17	17	18	18	18	17	16	14	15	14	14	14	15	16	16	16	16	16	16	16	17	17	19
Tochigi SC	8	19	21	15	12	12	17	18	18	20	20	22	18	19	18	17	19	20	20	20	20	21	20	21	20	21	21	21	21	21	21	21	21	21	21	21	21	21	21	21	21	20
Kagoshima United	3	10	13	12	18	21	22	22	22	22	22	21	16	18	20	21	18	18	18	19	19	20	19	20	21	20	20	18	20	20	20	20	20	20	20	20	20	20	20	20	20	21
FC Gifu	2	8	7	7	9	11	16	19	21	21	21	19	22	22	22	22	22	22	22	22	22	22	22	22	22	22	22	22	22	22	22	22	22	22	22	22	22	22	22	22	22	22

Leader and qualification for 2020 J1 League
Runner-up and qualification for 2020 J1 League
Qualification for promotion play-offs
Relegation to 2020 J3 League

Source: Meiji Yasuda J2 League

== Promotion–Relegation Playoffs ==
In the first two rounds of the 2019 J.League J1/J2 Play-Offs (2019 J1参入プレーオフ), if the score is tied after 90 minutes, no extra time is played and the winner is the team with the best J2 League ranking. In the final match against the J1 team, if the score is tied after 90 minutes, no extra time is played and the J1 team wins.

1st Round; 01 Dec
J2 (4)	Tokushima Vortis	1
J2 (5)	Ventforet Kofu	1
J2 (3)	Omiya Ardija	0
J2 (6)	Montedio Yamagata	2

2nd Round; 08 Dec
J2 (4)	Tokushima Vortis	1
J2 (6)	Montedio Yamagata	0

Final; 14 Dec
J1 (16)	Shonan Bellmare	1
J2 (4)	Tokushima Vortis	1

=== 1st round ===
1 December 2019
13:05

Omiya Ardija	0–2	Montedio Yamagata
	Report	Shinozuka 73' (o.g.); Yamagishi 82'

NACK5 Stadium Omiya, Saitama
Attendance: 10,942

1 December 2019
13:05

Tokushima Vortis	1–1	Ventforet Kofu
Buijs 37'	Report	Utaka 39'

Pocarisweat Stadium, Naruto, Tokushima
Attendance: 8,418

=== 2nd round ===
8 December 2019
13:05

Tokushima Vortis	1–0	Montedio Yamagata
Kawata 53'	Report

Pocarisweat Stadium, Naruto, Tokushima
Attendance: 10,376

=== Final ===
14 December 2019
13:03

Shonan Bellmare	1–1	Tokushima Vortis
Matsuda 64'	Report	Suzuki 20'

Shonan BMW Stadium Hiratsuka, Hiratsuka, Kanagawa
Attendance: 13,814

Shonan Bellmare remains in J1 League.
Tokushima Vortis remains in J2 League.

== Top scorers ==
As of matches played November 24th, 2019.

Rank	Player	Club	Goals
1	(Brazil) Leonardo	Albirex Niigata	28
2	(Kenya) Michael Olunga	Kashiwa Reysol	27
3	(Japan) Hiroto Goya	V-Varen Nagasaki	22
4	(Nigeria) Peter Utaka	Ventforet Kofu	20
5	(Brazil) Cristiano	Kashiwa Reysol	19
6	(Norway) Ibba	Yokohama FC	18
6	(South Korea) Lee Yong-jae	Fagiano Okayama	18
8	(Brazil) Kléber	JEF United Chiba	17
8	(Japan) Kazunari Ichimi	Kyoto Sanga	17
10	(Japan) Junki Koike	Tokyo Verdy	16
11	(Japan) Koji Suzuki	FC Ryukyu	15
11	(Japan) Hayato Nakama	Fagiano Okayama	15

== Attendances ==
Pos	Team	Total	High	Low	Average	Change
1	Albirex Niigata	304,445	20,486	8,777	14,497	−2.8%
2	JEF United Chiba	203,725	14,950	5,885	9,701	−1.6%
3	Omiya Ardija	199,040	12,090	5,874	9,478	+2.8%
4	Kashiwa Reysol	198,887	13,056	6,415	9,471	−16.9%^{†}
5	Fagiano Okayama	198,331	17,288	5,298	9,444	+9.8%
6	Montedio Yamagata	174,064	18,721	5,415	8,289	+22.5%
7	Ventforet Kofu	173,742	15,665	4,870	8,273	+12.0%
8	Kyoto Sanga	164,845	14,069	3,385	7,850	+38.6%
9	V-Varen Nagasaki	162,476	11,924	4,872	7,737	−31.1%^{†}
10	Yokohama FC	148,280	12,937	2,111	7,061	+15.0%
11	Avispa Fukuoka	146,639	12,028	3,578	6,983	−21.3%
12	FC Gifu	139,526	11,787	4,212	6,644	−3.1%
13	Mito HollyHock	127,824	9,874	3,886	6,087	+23.3%
14	Kagoshima United	121,493	7,955	4,079	5,785	+43.2%^{‡}
15	Tokushima Vortis	120,460	10,526	3,870	5,736	+14.8%
16	Renofa Yamaguchi	112,601	12,105	3,662	5,630	−8.1%
17	Tokyo Verdy	112,789	8,545	2,331	5,371	−9.5%
18	Zweigen Kanazawa	109,386	13,070	2,543	5,209	+15.0%
19	Tochigi SC	108,105	8,426	3,725	5,148	−9.0%
20	FC Ryukyu	100,409	12,019	2,428	4,953	+57.4%^{‡}
21	Machida Zelvia	99,077	8,814	3,009	4,718	−4.0%
22	Ehime FC	79,373	7,874	2,540	3,780	+19.6%
	League total	3,315,234	20,486	2,111	7,176	+1.8%

Updated to games played on 24 November 2019
Source: J. League Data
Notes:
^{†} Last year in J1 League。^{‡} Last year in J3 League。
