= Masafumi =

Masafumi (written: 正文, 正史, 雅文, 雅史, 将史, 真史, 優文) is a masculine Japanese given name. Notable people with the name include:

- Masafumi Akikawa (秋川 雅史, born 1967), Japanese tenor singer
- Masafumi Arima (有馬 正文, 1895–1944), Imperial Japanese Navy admiral
- Masafumi Gotoh (後藤 正文, born 1976), Japanese musician
- Masafumi Hara (原 正文, born 1943), Japanese footballer
- Masafumi Hirai (平井 正史, born 1975), Japanese baseball player
- Masafumi Kawaguchi (born 1973), Japanese player of American football
- Masafumi Kimura (木村 雅史, born 1976), Japanese voice actor
- Masafumi Maeda (前田 雅文, born 1983), Japanese footballer
- Masafumi Makiyama (牧山 雅文, born 1979), Japanese archer
- Masafumi Miyagi (宮城 雅史, born 1991), Japanese footballer
- Masafumi Miyamoto (宮本 雅史, born 1957), the founder of Square in 1983
- Masafumi Nishi (西 正文, born 1960), Japanese baseball player
- Masafumi Ogawa (小川 将史, born 1983), Japanese ice hockey player
- Masafumi Oura (大浦 正文, born 1969), Japanese volleyball player
- Masafumi Takada (高田 雅史, born 1970), Japanese video game music composer
- Masafumi Togano (栂野 雅史, born 1984), Japanese baseball player
- Masafumi Yokoyama (横山 正文, born 1956), Japanese footballer

== See also ==
- Masabumi
