= Atsuto =

- Gender: Male

Origin
- Origin: Japanese
- Meaning: Different meanings depending on the kanji used

Atsuto (written: 敦斗 or 篤人) is a masculine Japanese given name. Notable people with the name include:

- Atsuto Iida (born 1993), Japanese water polo player
- Atsuto Oishi (大石 篤人; born 1976), Japanese footballer
- Atsuto Tatara (多々良 敦斗; born 1987), Japanese footballer
- Atsuto Uchida (内田 篤人; born 1988), Japanese footballer
- Atsuto Suzuki (鈴木 厚人; born 1946), Japanese particle physicist
