= Yu Yong-hyeon =

South Korean footballer

Personal information
- Date of birth: 27 February 2000 (age 26)
- Place of birth: South Korea
- Height: 1.82 m (6 ft 0 in)
- Position: Midfielder

Youth career
- –2018: SOL FC

Senior career*
Years	Team	Apps	(Gls)
2019–2022	Fagiano Okayama	3	(0)
2022	Kōchi United	0	(0)
2022–2023	Gyeongnam	0	(0)
2023–2024	Chiangrai United	21	(1)

International career
- South Korea
- * Club domestic league appearances and goals as of 26 May 2024 (UTC)

- Yu Yong-hyeon
- Hangul: 유용현
- RR: Yu Yonghyeon
- MR: Yu Yonghyŏn

Yu Yong-hyeon (Korean: 유용현; born 27 February 2000) is a South Korean footballer who plays as a midfielder.

== Club statistics ==
As of 28 February 2020

Club	Season	League			National Cup		League Cup		Other		Total	
Club	Season	Division	Apps	Goals	Apps	Goals	Apps	Goals	Apps	Goals	Apps	Goals
Fagiano Okayama	2019	J2 League	1	0	2 (Note: Appearances in the Emperor's Cup)	0	0	0	0	0	3	0
Fagiano Okayama	2020	J2 League	2	0	0	0	0	0	0	0	0	0
Fagiano Okayama	2021	J2 League	0	0	0	0	0	0	0	0	0	0
Career total			3	0	2	0	0	0	0	0	3	0
