= Takuya Masuda =

Japanese footballer

Takuya Masuda 増田 卓也
Personal information
- Full name: Takuya Masuda
- Date of birth: 29 June 1989 (age 37)
- Place of birth: Asakita-ku, Hiroshima, Japan
- Height: 1.85 m (6 ft 1 in)
- Position: Goalkeeper

Team information
- Current team: Roasso Kumamoto
- Number: 13

Youth career
- 2005–2007: Hiroshima Minami High School

College career
| Years | Team | Apps | (Gls) |
| 2008–2011 | Ryutsu Keizai University | | |

Senior career*
| Years | Team | Apps | (Gls) |
| 2012–2021 | Sanfrecce Hiroshima | 4 | (0) |
| 2017–2018 | → V-Varen Nagasaki (loan) | 48 | (0) |
| 2019 | → FC Machida Zelvia (loan) | 38 | (0) |
| 2021 | → FC Machida Zelvia (loan) | 0 | (0) |
| 2021– | Roasso Kumamoto | 2 | (2) |
Medal record
Sanfrecce Hiroshima
| Winner | J1 League | 2012 |
| Winner | J1 League | 2013 |
| Winner | J1 League | 2015 |
| Runner-up | J.League Cup | 2014 |
| Runner-up | Emperor's Cup | 2013 |
Representing Japan
Asian Games
| Gold medal – first place | 2010 Guangzhou | Team |
- * Club domestic league appearances and goals as of 2 September 2023

Takuya Masuda (増田 卓也, born 29 June 1989) is a Japanese professional football goalkeeper who plays for Roasso Kumamoto.

== Club statistics ==
Updated to end of 2018 season.

| Club performance | | | League | | Cup | | League Cup | | Continental | | Other^{1} | | Total | |
| Season | Club | League | Apps | Goals | Apps | Goals | Apps | Goals | Apps | Goals | Apps | Goals | Apps | Goals |
| Japan | | | League | | Emperor's Cup | | League Cup | | AFC | | Other | | Total | |
|---|---|---|---|---|---|---|---|---|---|---|---|---|---|---|
| 2012 | Sanfrecce Hiroshima | J1 League | 0 | 0 | 1 | 0 | 2 | 0 | - | | - | | 3 | 0 |
| 2013 | Sanfrecce Hiroshima | J1 League | 1 | 0 | 3 | 0 | 1 | 0 | 1 | 0 | 1 | 0 | 7 | 0 |
| 2014 | Sanfrecce Hiroshima | J1 League | 3 | 0 | 1 | 0 | 0 | 0 | 0 | 0 | 0 | 0 | 4 | 0 |
| 2015 | Sanfrecce Hiroshima | J1 League | 0 | 0 | 2 | 0 | 4 | 0 | - | | 0 | 0 | 6 | 0 |
| 2016 | Sanfrecce Hiroshima | J1 League | 0 | 0 | 0 | 0 | 0 | 0 | 1 | 0 | 0 | 0 | 1 | 0 |
| 2017 | V-Varen Nagasaki | J2 League | 42 | 0 | 0 | 0 | - | | - | | - | | 42 | 0 |
| 2018 | V-Varen Nagasaki | J1 League | 6 | 0 | 0 | 0 | 4 | 0 | - | | - | | 10 | 0 |
| Career total | | | 52 | 0 | 7 | 0 | 11 | 0 | 2 | 0 | 1 | 0 | 73 | 0 |

^{1}Includes Japanese Super Cup, FIFA Club World Cup and J. League Championship.
