= Taishi Tsunada =

Japanese footballer

Taishi Tsunada 綱田 大志
Personal information
- Full name: Taishi Tsunada
- Date of birth: April 5, 1984 (age 42)
- Place of birth: Unzen, Japan
- Height: 1.64 m (5 ft 4 1/2 in)
- Position: Midfielder

Team information
- Current team: FC Tokushima
- Number: 15

Youth career
- 2003–2006: National Institute of Fitness and Sports in Kanoya

Senior career*
Years	Team	Apps	(Gls)
2007–2017	Kamatamare Sanuki	171	(11)
2018–	FC Tokushima		
- * Club domestic league appearances and goals as of 23 February 2018

Taishi Tsunada (綱田 大志, Tsunada Taishi; born April 5, 1984 in Nagasaki) is a Japanese football player for Kamatamare Sanuki.

== Career statistics ==
Updated to 23 February 2018.

Appearances and goals by club, season and competition
Club	Season	League			Emperor's Cup		Total	
Club	Season	Division	Apps	Goals	Apps	Goals	Apps	Goals
Kamatamare Sanuki	2008	JRL (Shikoku)	11	3	2	0	13	3
Kamatamare Sanuki	2009	JRL (Shikoku)	14	5	2	0	16	5
Kamatamare Sanuki	2010	JRL (Shikoku)	14	1	2	0	16	1
Kamatamare Sanuki	2011	JFL	32	1	1	0	33	1
Kamatamare Sanuki	2012	JFL	30	0	3	0	33	0
Kamatamare Sanuki	2013	JFL	26	1	2	0	28	1
Kamatamare Sanuki	2014	J2 League	14	0	0	0	14	0
Kamatamare Sanuki	2015	J2 League	13	0	1	0	14	0
Kamatamare Sanuki	2016	J2 League	11	0	1	0	12	0
Kamatamare Sanuki	2017	J2 League	6	0	1	0	7	0
Career total			171	11	15	0	186	11
