= Kazuaki Saso =

Japanese footballer

Kazuaki Saso 佐相 壱明
Personal information
- Full name: Kazuaki Saso
- Date of birth: June 16, 1999 (age 27)
- Place of birth: Tokyo, Japan
- Height: 1.74 m (5 ft 9 in)
- Position: Left winger

Team information
- Current team: Matsumoto Yamaga FC
- Number: 22

Youth career
- 2015–2017: Shohei High School

Senior career*
Years	Team	Apps	(Gls)
2018–2022	Omiya Ardija	12	(0)
2020	→ Nagano Parceiro (loan)	27	(5)
2022–2024	Sagamihara	47	(1)
2024-	Matsumoto Yamaga	57	(2)
- * Club domestic league appearances and goals as of 24 August 2026

Kazuaki Saso (佐相 壱明, Saso Kazuaki; born June 16, 1999) is a Japanese football player who plays for Matsumoto Yamaga FC.

== Career ==
After attending the Shohei High School, Saso was registered as a special designated player by Omiya Ardija in August 2017.

== Club statistics ==
Updated to 29 August 2018.

Appearances and goals by club, season and competition
Club	Season	League			Emperor's Cup		Total	
Club	Season	Division	Apps	Goals	Apps	Goals	Apps	Goals
Omiya Ardija	2018	J2 League	1	0	1	0	2	0
Total			1	0	1	0	2	0
