= Kojiro Shinohara =

Japanese footballer

Kojiro Shinohara 篠原 弘次郎
Personal information
- Full name: Kojiro Shinohara
- Date of birth: July 20, 1991 (age 35)
- Place of birth: Saga, Japan
- Height: 1.76 m (5 ft 9 1/2 in)
- Position: Defender

Team information
- Current team: Matsumoto Yamaga FC
- Number: 39

Youth career
- 2007–2008: Cerezo Osaka
- 2009: Higashi Fukuoka High School

Senior career*
Years	Team	Apps	(Gls)
2010–2017	Fagiano Okayama	97	(4)
2010–2011	→ Fagiano Okayama Next (loan)	26	(1)
2014	→ Roasso Kumamoto (loan)	27	(0)
2018–2020	Avispa Fukuoka	33	(0)
2021–	Matsumoto Yamaga FC		
- * Club domestic league appearances and goals as of 9 January 2022

Kojiro Shinohara (篠原 弘次郎, born July 20, 1991) is a Japanese football player for Matsumoto Yamaga FC.

== Career statistics ==
Updated to end of 2018 season.

Appearances and goals by club, season and competition
Club	Season	League			Emperor's Cup		Total	
Club	Season	Division	Apps	Goals	Apps	Goals	Apps	Goals
Fagiano Okayama	2010	J2 League	0	0	0	0	0	0
Fagiano Okayama	2011	J2 League	3	0	0	0	3	0
Fagiano Okayama	2012	J2 League	12	0	1	0	13	0
Fagiano Okayama	2013	J2 League	6	0	1	0	7	0
Roasso Kumamoto	2014	J2 League	27	0	0	0	27	0
Fagiano Okayama	2015	J2 League	21	3	1	0	22	3
Fagiano Okayama	2016	J2 League	32	0	2	0	34	0
Fagiano Okayama	2017	J2 League	33	1	0	0	33	1
Avispa Fukuoka	2018	J2 League	33	0	1	0	34	0
Career total			167	4	6	0	173	4
