= Giovanni Clunie =

Japanese footballer (born 1994)

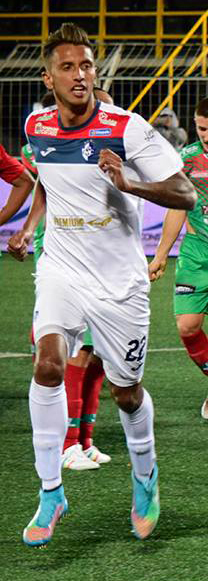
- Clunie in 2017

Personal information
- Full name: Giovanni Pierre Clunie Asenjo
- Date of birth: 20 December 1994; 31 years ago
- Place of birth: Cartago, Costa Rica
- Height: 1.93 m (6 ft 4 in)
- Position: Forward

Team information
- Current team: ReinMeer Aomori
- Number: 49

Senior career*
Years	Team	Apps	(Gls)
2012–2020	Cartaginés	108	(11)
2013–2014	→ A.D. Turrialba (loan)		
2019	→ Zweigen Kanazawa (loan)	30	(7)
2020–2021	Jicaral	32	(5)
2021–2022	Sporting F.C.	20	(2)
2022–2023	Santos de Guápiles	5	(0)
2023–	ReinMeer Aomori	0	(0)
- * Club domestic league appearances and goals as of 28 August 2023

Giovanni Clunie (born 20 December 1994) is a Costa Rican professional footballer who plays as a forward for ReinMeer Aomori. He used to play for Zweigen Kanazawa.
