= Masafumi Miyagi =

Japanese footballer (born 1991)

Masafumi Miyagi 宮城 雅史
Personal information
- Full name: Masafumi Miyagi
- Date of birth: January 19, 1991 (age 35)
- Place of birth: Uruma, Okinawa, Japan
- Height: 1.80 m (5 ft 11 in)
- Position: Defender

Team information
- Current team: Reilac Shiga FC
- Number: 3

Youth career
- 2006–2008: Gushikawa High School
- 2009–2012: Komazawa University

Senior career*
Years	Team	Apps	(Gls)
2013	Tochigi Uva FC	23	(3)
2014–2017	Renofa Yamaguchi	96	(14)
2018–2021	Kyoto Sanga	15	(0)
2021–2022	Tegevajaro Miyazaki	0	(0)
2022–2023	BTOP Thank Kuriyama	6	(0)
2023–	Reilac Shiga FC	51	(3)
- * Club domestic league appearances and goals as of 23 August 2026

Masafumi Miyagi (宮城 雅史, Miyagi Masafumi; born January 19, 1991) is a Japanese footballer who plays as a defender for Japan Football League club Reilac Shiga FC.

== Career ==
Miyagi attended Komazawa University, where he won the 39th Prime Minister Cup in July 2010. He was signed by Tochigi Uva in his rookie season.

After leaving because out of contract, Miyagi signed a new deal with JFL newly promoted side Renofa Yamaguchi. He had the opportunity to play as forward, but in the end the club registered him as defender, despite scoring 11 goals in two season. Miyagi was instrumental to win the J3 League in 2015, gaining the first promotion in J2 for Renofa.

== Club statistics ==
As of 10 November 2023.

Appearances and goals by club, season and competition
Club	Season	League			National Cup		Total	
Club	Season	Division	Apps	Goals	Apps	Goals	Apps	Goals
Japan			League		Emperor's Cup		Total	
Tochigi Uva FC	2013	JFL	23	3	2	0	25	3
Renofa Yamaguchi	2014	JFL	20	6	-		20	6
Renofa Yamaguchi	2015	J3 League	34	5	1	0	35	5
Renofa Yamaguchi	2016	J2 League	18	0	2	0	20	0
Renofa Yamaguchi	2017	J2 League	24	3	0	0	24	3
Renofa Yamaguchi	Total		96	14	3	0	99	14
Kyoto Sanga	2018	J2 League	8	0	1	0	9	0
Kyoto Sanga	2019	J2 League	7	0	1	0	8	0
Kyoto Sanga	2020	J2 League	0	0	0	0	0	0
Kyoto Sanga	Total		15	0	2	0	17	0
Tegevajaro Miyazaki	2021	J3 League	0	0	0	0	0	0
BTOP Thank Kuriyama	2022	Hokkaido Soccer League	6	0	0	0	6	0
Reilac Shiga FC	2023	JFL	12	2	2	0	14	2
Career total			152	19	9	0	161	19
