= Kohei Uchida =

Japanese footballer

Personal information
- Full name: Kohei Uchida
- Date of birth: 19 May 1993 (age 33)
- Place of birth: Saitama, Japan
- Height: 1.75 m (5 ft 9 in)
- Position: Midfielder

Team information
- Current team: Tochigi SC
- Number: 88

Youth career
- Sumire FC
- –2008: FC Coruja
- 2009–2011: Shochi Fukaya High School

Senior career*
Years	Team	Apps	(Gls)
2012–2017	Mito HollyHock	150	(4)
2018–2024	Tokushima Vortis	126	(8)
2025–	Tochigi SC	18	(0)
- * Club domestic league appearances and goals as of 17 August 2026

Kohei Uchida (内田 航平, Uchida Kōhei; born 19 May 1993) is a Japanese professional footballer who plays as a midfielder for Tochigi SC.

== Career ==
In his youth, Uchida played with Sumire FC, FC Coruja and Shochi Fukaya High School's football club. In the Winter of 2011/2012 signed with J League 2 side Mito HollyHock and played four time, in his first professional season.

== Club statistics ==
Updated to end of 2018 season.

Appearances and goals by club, season and competition
Club	Season	League			Emperor's Cup		Total	
Club	Season	Division	Apps	Goals	Apps	Goals	Apps	Goals
Mito HollyHock	2012	J2 League	4	0	0	0	4	0
Mito HollyHock	2013	J2 League	20	0	2	0	22	0
Mito HollyHock	2014	J2 League	31	1	2	0	33	1
Mito HollyHock	2015	J2 League	34	0	0	0	34	0
Mito HollyHock	2016	J2 League	25	1	1	0	26	1
Mito HollyHock	2017	J2 League	36	2	0	0	36	2
Tokushima Vortis	2018	J2 League	1	0	0	0	1	0
Total			151	4	5	0	156	4
