= Yusuke Higa =

Japanese footballer (born 1989)

Yusuke Higa 比嘉 祐介
Personal information
- Full name: Yusuke Higa
- Date of birth: 15 May 1989 (age 37)
- Place of birth: Nago, Okinawa, Japan
- Height: 1.68 m (5 ft 6 in)
- Position: Left back

Youth career
- 2005–2007: RKU Kashiwa High School

College career
| Years | Team | Apps | (Gls) |
| 2008–2011 | Ryutsu Keizai University | | |

Senior career*
| Years | Team | Apps | (Gls) |
| 2008–2010 | Ryutsu Keizai Univ. FC | 27 | (0) |
| 2012–2015 | Yokohama F. Marinos | 2 | (0) |
| 2014 | → Kyoto Sanga (loan) | 18 | (1) |
| 2016–2017 | JEF United Chiba | 17 | (0) |
| 2018–2019 | Tokyo Verdy | 0 | (0) |

International career^{‡}
| 2009 | Japan U20 | 8 | (0) |
| 2010–2012 | Japan U23 | 16 | (0) |
Medal record
Yokohama F. Marinos
| Runner-up | J1 League | 2013 |
| Winner | Emperor's Cup | 2013 |
Representing Japan
Asian Games
| Gold medal – first place | 2010 Guangzhou | Team |
- * Club domestic league appearances and goals as of 3 January 2019 ‡ National team caps and goals as of 18 March 2018

Yusuke Higa (比嘉 祐介, Higa Yūsuke; born 15 May 1989 in Okinawa Prefecture) is a former Japanese footballer who last played for Tokyo Verdy as a left back.

== Playing career ==
After playing with several teams, most recently Tokyo Verdy (though only playing one game for the club), Higa announced his retirement at 30 years old in February 2019.

== Career statistics ==
=== Club ===
Updated to 23 December 2018.

| Club | Season | League | | Emperor's Cup | | J. League Cup | | Total | |
| Club | Season | Apps | Goals | Apps | Goals | Apps | Goals | Apps | Goals |
|---|---|---|---|---|---|---|---|---|---|
| Ryutsu Keizai University FC | 2008 | 20 | 0 | 2 | 0 | - | | 22 | 0 |
| Ryutsu Keizai University FC | 2009 | 7 | 0 | 2 | 0 | - | | 9 | 0 |
| Ryutsu Keizai University FC | 2010 | 0 | 0 | 1 | 0 | - | | 1 | 0 |
| Yokohama F. Marinos | 2012 | 1 | 0 | 1 | 0 | 4 | 0 | 6 | 0 |
| Yokohama F. Marinos | 2013 | 0 | 0 | 1 | 0 | 1 | 0 | 2 | 0 |
| Kyoto Sanga | 2014 | 18 | 1 | 0 | 0 | - | | 18 | 1 |
| Yokohama F. Marinos | 2015 | 1 | 0 | 1 | 0 | 5 | 0 | 7 | 0 |
| JEF United Chiba | 2016 | 9 | 0 | 2 | 0 | - | | 11 | 0 |
| JEF United Chiba | 2017 | 8 | 0 | 0 | 0 | - | | 8 | 0 |
| Tokyo Verdy | 2018 | 0 | 0 | 1 | 0 | - | | 0 | 0 |
| Career total | | 64 | 1 | 11 | 0 | 10 | 0 | 85 | 1 |

=== International ===
As of 19 June 2011

| National team | Year | Apps | Goals |
|---|---|---|---|
Japan U20
| Japan U20 | 2009 | 8 | 0 |
| Japan U20 | Total | 8 | 0 |
Japan U23
| Japan U23 | 2010 | 10 | 0 |
| Japan U23 | 2011 | 6 | 0 |
| Japan U23 | Total | 16 | 0 |

== Awards and honours ==
=== Japan ===
- Asian Games: 1

2010
