= Masabumi =

- Gender: Male

Origin
- Origin: Japanese
- Meaning: Different meanings depending on the kanji used

Masabumi (written: 雅章 or 正文) is a masculine Japanese given name. Notable people with the name include:

- Masabumi Hosono (細野 正文; 1870–1939), Japanese civil servant and RMS Titanic passenger
- Masabumi Kikuchi (菊地 雅章; born 1939), Japanese jazz pianist and composer
