= Eisuke Fujishima =

Japanese footballer (born 1987)

Eisuke Fujishima 藤嶋 栄介
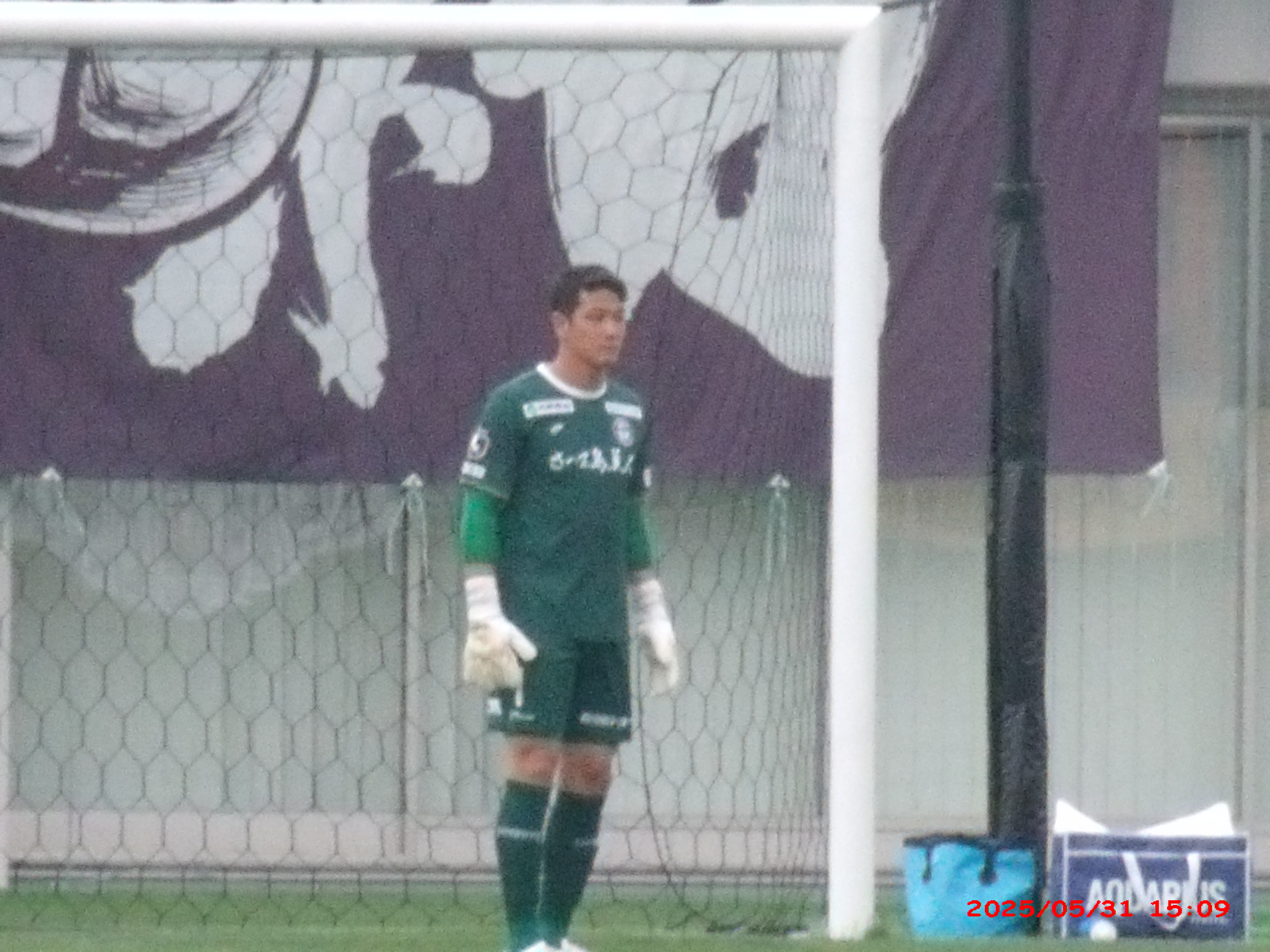

Personal information
- Full name: Eisuke Fujishima
- Date of birth: 31 January 1992 (age 34)
- Place of birth: Kumamoto, Japan
- Height: 1.86 m (6 ft 1 in)
- Position: Goalkeeper

Team information
- Current team: Kagoshima United FC
- Number: 1

Youth career
- 2007–2009: Ohzu High School

College career
Years	Team	Apps	(Gls)
2010–2013	Fukuoka University		

Senior career*
Years	Team	Apps	(Gls)
2013–2017	Sagan Tosu	3	(0)
2016	→ JEF United Chiba (loan)	0	(0)
2017	→ Matsumoto Yamaga (loan)	0	(0)
2018–2019	Renofa Yamaguchi	25	(0)
2019	→ Kawasaki Frontale (loan)	0	(0)
2020	Kawasaki Frontale	0	(0)
2020–2024	Montedio Yamagata	32	(0)
2025–	Kagoshima United	26	(0)
- * Club domestic league appearances and goals as of 1 January 2026

Eisuke Fujishima (藤嶋 栄介, Fujishima, Eisuke; born 16 October 1987) is a Japanese footballer who plays for Kagoshima United FC.

== Club statistics ==
Updated to 28 July 2022.

Club performance			League		Cup		League Cup		Total	
Season	Club	League	Apps	Goals	Apps	Goals	Apps	Goals	Apps	Goals
Japan			League		Emperor's Cup		J.League Cup		Total	
2013	Sagan Tosu	J1 League	2	0	–		0	0	2	0
2014	Sagan Tosu	J1 League	0	0	0	0	0	0	0	0
2015	Sagan Tosu	J1 League	1	0	0	0	1	0	2	0
2016	JEF United Chiba	J2 League	0	0	0	0	–		0	0
2017	Matsumoto Yamaga	J2 League	1	0	1	0	–		2	0
2018	Renofa Yamaguchi	J2 League	25	0	2	0	–		27	0
2019	Kawasaki Frontale	J1 League	0	0	0	0	0	0	0	0
2020	Kawasaki Frontale	J1 League	0	0	–		0	0	0	0
2020	Montedio Yamagata	J2 League	11	0	–		–		11	0
2021	Montedio Yamagata	J2 League	21	0	0	0	–		21	0
2022	Montedio Yamagata	J2 League	0	0	1	0	–		1	0
Career total			61	0	4	0	1	0	66	0
