= Ryusei Saito =

Japanese footballer

Ryusei Saito 齊藤 隆成
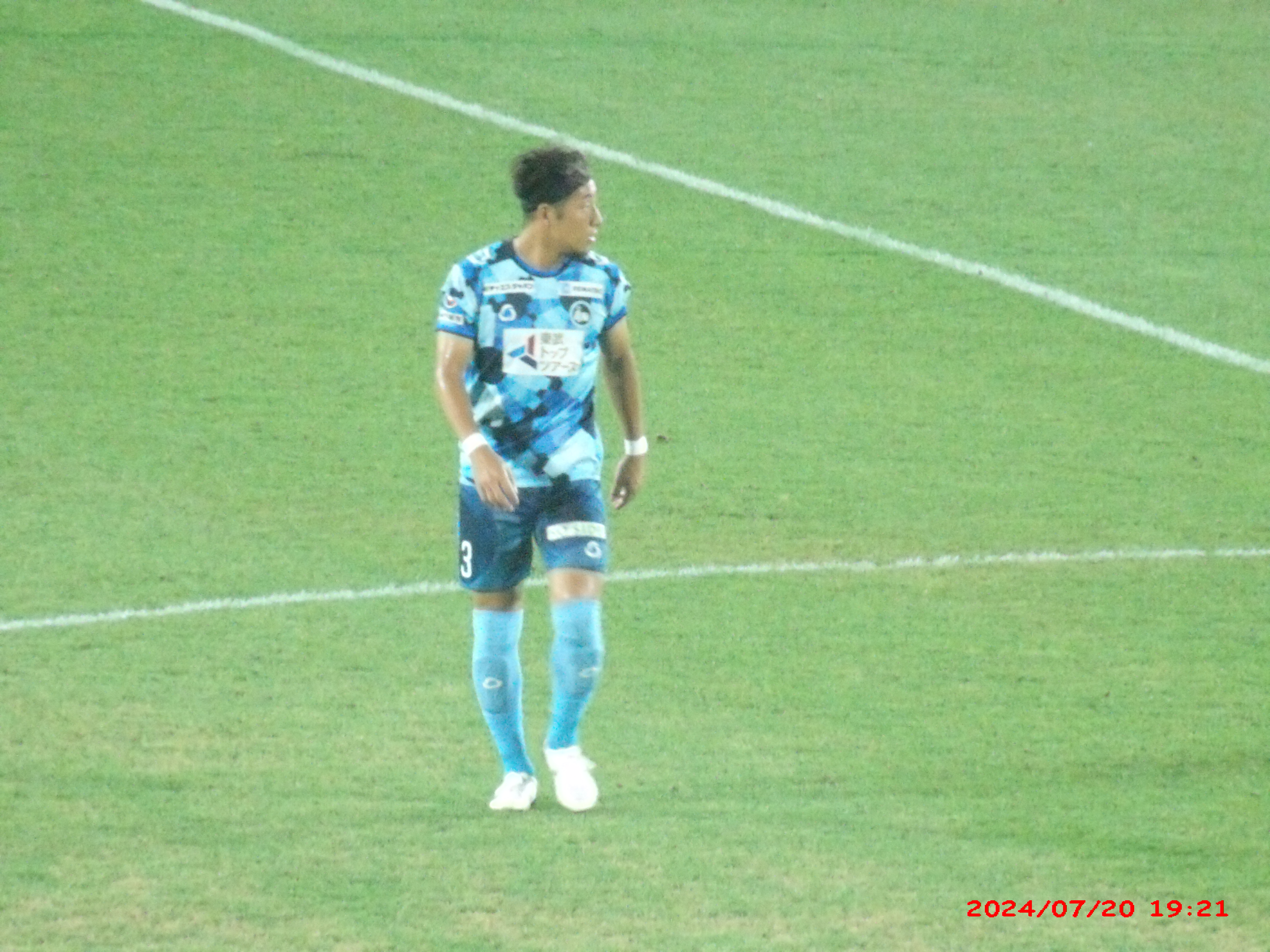

Personal information
- Full name: Ryusei Saito
- Date of birth: 30 April 1994 (age 32)
- Place of birth: Tondabayashi, Osaka, Japan
- Height: 1.80 m (5 ft 11 in)
- Position: Defender

Youth career
- –2013: Kyoto Sanga

Senior career*
Years	Team	Apps	(Gls)
2013–2017	Kyoto Sanga	1	(0)
2013–2014	→ Sagawa Printing Kyoto (loan)	13	(2)
2015	→ FC Osaka (loan)	26	(0)
2017	→ Mito HollyHock (loan)	2	(1)
2018	Fujieda MYFC	19	(0)
2019	Route Eleven		
2019–2024	FC Osaka		
- * Club domestic league appearances and goals as of 12 July 2019

Ryusei Saito (齊藤 隆成, Saitō Ryūsei; born 30 April 1994 in Tondabayashi, Osaka) is a Japanese footballer who plays for FC Osaka.

== Club statistics ==
Updated to 23 February 2019.

Club performance			League		Cup		Total	
Season	Club	League	Apps	Goals	Apps	Goals	Apps	Goals
Japan			League		Emperor's Cup		Total	
2013	Sagawa Printing Kyoto	JFL	2	0	0	0	2	0
2014	Sagawa Printing Kyoto	JFL	11	2	–		11	2
2015	FC Osaka	JFL	26	0	1	0	27	0
2016	Kyoto Sanga	J2 League	1	0	1	0	2	0
2017	Mito HollyHock	J2 League	2	1	0	0	2	1
2018	Fujieda MYFC	J3 League	19	0	0	0	19	0
Career total			60	3	2	0	62	3
