= Henik (footballer) =

Brazilian footballer (born 1989)

Personal information
- Full name: Henik Luiz de Andrade
- Date of birth: 8 September 1989 (age 37)
- Place of birth: Paraná, Brazil
- Height: 1.82 m (6 ft 0 in)
- Positions: Defensive midfielder; centre-back

Team information
- Current team: Tochigi City FC

Senior career*
Years	Team	Apps	(Gls)
2010–2013	Criciúma	34	(0)
2012	→ Villa Nova AC (loan)	0	(0)
2012	→ ABC (loan)	9	(0)
2014–2015	FC Gifu	71	(5)
2016	Botafogo-PB	4	(0)
2017	FC Gifu	18	(1)
2018–2019	Tochigi SC	77	(3)
2020–2021	Renofa Yamaguchi	30	(2)
2022	FC Gifu	17	(0)
2023–	Tochigi City FC	15	(1)
- * Club domestic league appearances and goals as of 26 November 2023, 10:00 (UTC)

Henik Luiz de Andrade or simply Henik (ヘニキ, Heniki, born 8 September 1989 in Astorga, Paraná), is a Brazilian footballer who play as a Defensive midfielder or Centre-back and currently play for Tochigi City FC.

== Career ==
On 7 March 2023, Henik announcement officially transfer to Kanto club, Tochigi City FC for ahead of 2023 season.

== Career statistics ==
=== Club ===
Updated to the end of 2023 season.

Club performance			League		Cup		Cup		Total	
Season	Club	League	Apps	Goals	Apps	Goals	Apps	Goals	Apps	Goals
Japan			League		Emperor's Cup		J. League Cup		Total	
2014	FC Gifu	J2 League	31	2	1	0	—		32	2
2015	FC Gifu	J2 League	40	3	1	0	—		41	3
2017	FC Gifu	J2 League	18	1	1	0	—		19	1
2018	Tochigi SC	J2 League	38	0	—				38	0
2019	Tochigi SC	J2 League	39	3	—				38	3
2020	Renofa Yamaguchi	J2 League	30	2	—				30	2
2021	Renofa Yamaguchi	J2 League	8	1	1	0	—		9	1
2022	FC Gifu	J3 League	17	0	—				17	0
2023	Tochigi City FC	Kanto Soccer League	15	1	2	1	—		17	2
2024	Tochigi City FC	Japan Football League	0	0	0	0	—		0	0
Total			296	12	6	1	—		302	13

== International career ==
In late July 2013, Henik was called up to the Equatorial Guinea national football team for a friendly that was going to happen on the 14th of the following month. However, the match was later cancelled, preventing him to travel and get naturalize – Equatorial Guinea used to field Brazilian footballers at the time. He was never called up again.

== Honours ==
Tochigi City FC

- Japanese Regional Football Champions League: 2023
