= Tsubasa Oya =

Japanese footballer

Tsubasa Oya 大屋 翼
Personal information
- Full name: Tsubasa Oya
- Date of birth: August 13, 1986 (age 40)
- Place of birth: Gōtsu, Shimane, Japan
- Height: 1.80 m (5 ft 11 in)
- Position: Defender

Youth career
- Sanfrecce Hiroshima
- 2005–2008: Kansai University

Senior career*
Years	Team	Apps	(Gls)
2009–2014	Vissel Kobe	48	(1)
2012	→ Fagiano Okayama (loan)	2	(0)
2015–2017	Omiya Ardija	44	(0)
2018	Tokushima Vortis	4	(0)
2019	Gainare Tottori	20	(0)
- * Club domestic league appearances and goals

Tsubasa Oya (大屋 翼, Ōya Tsubasa; born August 13, 1986) is a former Japanese football player who last played for Gainare Tottori.

== Career ==
After a long career, Oya retired in February 2020 to become a school coach for Vissel Kobe.

== Club statistics ==
Updated to 23 February 2020.

Club performance			League		Cup		League Cup		Total	
Season	Club	League	Apps	Goals	Apps	Goals	Apps	Goals	Apps	Goals
Japan			League		Emperor's Cup		League Cup		Total	
2009	Vissel Kobe	J1 League	3	0	2	0	0	0	5	0
2010	Vissel Kobe	J1 League	0	0	0	0	0	0	0	0
2011	Vissel Kobe	J1 League	2	0	2	0	0	0	4	0
2012	Vissel Kobe	J1 League	11	1	4	0	0	0	15	1
2012	Fagiano Okayama	J2 League	2	0	1	0	-		3	0
2013	Vissel Kobe	J2 League	20	0	0	0	-		20	0
2014	Vissel Kobe	J1 League	12	0	1	0	5	1	18	1
2015	Omiya Ardija	J2 League	18	0	2	0	-		20	0
2016	Omiya Ardija	J1 League	20	0	3	1	7	0	30	1
2017	Omiya Ardija	J1 League	6	0	4	0	5	0	15	0
2018	Tokushima Vortis	J2 League	4	0	1	0	-		5	0
2019	Gainare Tottori	J3 League	20	0	0	0	-		20	0
Career total			118	1	20	1	17	1	155	3
