= Shun Ito =

Japanese footballer

Shun Ito 伊東 俊
Personal information
- Full name: Shun Ito
- Date of birth: October 29, 1987 (age 39)
- Place of birth: Sapporo, Japan
- Height: 1.65 m (5 ft 5 in)
- Position: Midfielder

Youth career
- 2003–2005: Aomori Yamada High School

College career
Years	Team	Apps	(Gls)
2006–2009	Kokushikan University		

Senior career*
Years	Team	Apps	(Gls)
2010–2016	Montedio Yamagata	115	(13)
2012	→ Ehime FC (loan)	13	(1)
2017	Kyoto Sanga FC	16	(1)
2018–2024	Roasso Kumamoto	91	(12)
Medal record
Montedio Yamagata
Runner-up	Emperor's Cup	2014
- * Club domestic league appearances and goals as of 4 January 2025

Shun Ito (伊東 俊, Itō Shun; born October 29, 1987) is a Japanese football player currently playing for Roasso Kumamoto.

== Career statistics ==
Updated to 23 February 2018.

Club performance			League		Cup		League Cup		Other		Total	
Season	Club	League	Apps	Goals	Apps	Goals	Apps	Goals	Apps	Goals	Apps	Goals
Japan			League		Emperor's Cup		League Cup		Other^{1}		Total	
2010	Montedio Yamagata	J1 League	3	0	1	0	0	0	-		4	0
2011	Montedio Yamagata	J1 League	21	3	2	0	1	0	-		24	3
2012	Montedio Yamagata	J2 League	2	0	-		-		-		2	0
2012	Ehime FC	J2 League	13	1	1	0	-		-		14	1
2013	Montedio Yamagata	J2 League	33	5	2	1	-		-		35	6
2014	Montedio Yamagata	J2 League	24	4	4	0	-		1	0	29	4
2015	Montedio Yamagata	J1 League	4	0	0	0	2	1	–		6	1
2016	Montedio Yamagata	J2 League	28	1	3	0	–		–		31	1
2017	Kyoto Sanga	J2 League	16	1	1	0	–		–		17	1
Career total			144	15	16	1	3	1	1	0	164	17

^{1}Includes J1 Promotion Playoffs.
