= Kenji Arabori =

Japanese footballer

Kenji Arabori 荒堀 謙次
Personal information
- Full name: Kenji Arabori
- Date of birth: July 31, 1988 (age 38)
- Place of birth: Yasu, Shiga, Japan
- Height: 1.68 m (5 ft 6 in)
- Position: Midfielder

Youth career
- 2007–2010: Doshisha University

Senior career*
Years	Team	Apps	(Gls)
2011	Yokohama FC	30	(3)
2012	Tochigi SC	17	(0)
2013–2014	Shonan Bellmare	3	(0)
2014	→ Tochigi SC (loan)	15	(3)
2015	Tochigi SC	38	(3)
2016–2017	Montedio Yamagata	26	(0)
2018–2019	Kamatamare Sanuki	36	(0)
- * Club domestic league appearances and goals as of 5 April 2020

Kenji Arabori (荒堀 謙次, born July 31, 1988) is a former Japanese football player.

== Club statistics ==
Updated to 23 February 2020.

Club performance			League		Cup		League Cup		Total	
Season	Club	League	Apps	Goals	Apps	Goals	Apps	Goals	Apps	Goals
Japan			League		Emperor's Cup		J. League Cup		Total	
2011	Yokohama FC	J2 League	30	3	1	0	-		31	3
2012	Tochigi SC	J2 League	17	0	0	0	-		17	0
2013	Shonan Bellmare	J1 League	2	0	1	0	4	0	7	0
2014	Shonan Bellmare	J2 League	1	0	1	0	-		2	0
2014	Tochigi SC	J2 League	15	3	-		-		15	3
2015	Tochigi SC	J2 League	38	3	0	0	-		38	3
2016	Montedio Yamagata	J2 League	10	0	1	0	-		11	0
2017	Montedio Yamagata	J2 League	16	0	1	0	-		17	0
2018	Kamatamare Sanuki	J2 League	17	0	0	0	-		17	0
2019	Kamatamare Sanuki	J3 League	19	0	2	1	-		21	1
Total			165	9	7	1	4	0	176	10
