= Takumu Fujinuma =

Japanese footballer

Takumu Fujinuma 藤沼 拓夢
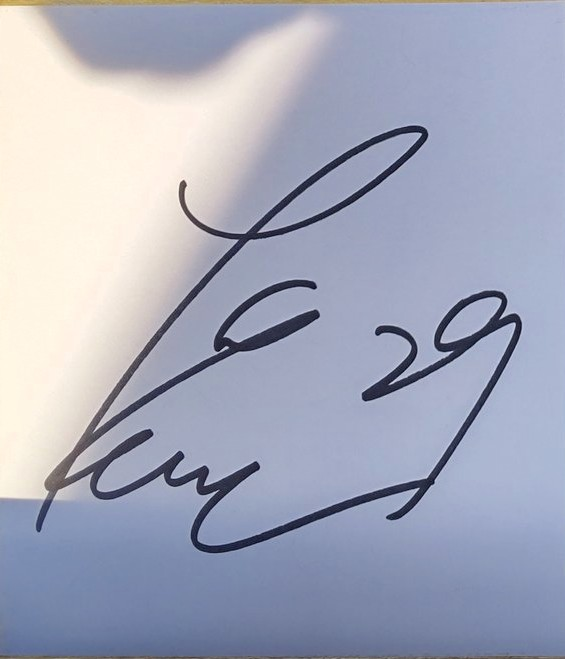
- Takumu's autograph

Personal information
- Full name: Takumu Fujinuma
- Date of birth: June 14, 1997 (age 29)
- Place of birth: Saitama, Japan
- Height: 1.71 m (5 ft 7 1/2 in)
- Position: Forward

Team information
- Current team: SC Sagamihara
- Number: 97

Youth career
- –2015: Omiya Ardija

Senior career*
Years	Team	Apps	(Gls)
2016–2021	Omiya Ardija	0	(0)
2017	→ Tochigi SC (loan)	12	(1)
2018	→ Grulla Morioka (loan)	29	(6)
2019	→ Blaublitz Akita (loan)	22	(7)
2022–	SC Sagamihara	62	(12)
- * Club domestic league appearances and goals as of 1 January 2026

Takumu Fujinuma (藤沼 拓夢, Fujinuma Takumu; born June 14, 1997) is a Japanese football player who currently plays for SC Sagamihara.

== Career ==
=== Omiya Ardija ===
Fujinuma joined J1 League club Omiya Ardija in 2016. On April 12, 2017, he made his debut against Kashiwa Reysol in the J.League Cup.

On 30 December 2021, it was announced that Fujinuma's contract would not be renewed.

=== Loan to Tochigi SC ===
In July, he moved to Tochigi SC.

=== Loan to Iwate Grulla Morioka ===
Fujinuma made his debut for Iwate against Gamba Osaka U-23 on 11 March 2018. He scored his first goal for the club against Thespakusatsu Gunma on 1 April 2018, scoring in the 67th minute.

=== Loan to Blaublitz Akita ===
In 2019, Fujinuma joined Blaublitz on loan from Omiya. Fujinuma scored on his debut for Blaublitz against Thespakustasu, scoring in the 75th minute.

=== SC Sagamihara ===
On 3 March 2022, Fujinuma was announced at SC Sagamihara. He scored on his debut for Sagamihara against Tegevajaro Miyazaki, scoring in the 56th and 87th minute. On 22 December 2023, Fujinuma signed a new contract for the 2024 season.

== Career statistics ==
Updated to 1 April 2021.

Appearances and goals by club, season and competition
Club	Season	League			Emperor's Cup		J.League Cup		Total	
Club	Season	Division	Apps	Goals	Apps	Goals	Apps	Goals	Apps	Goals
Omiya Ardija	2016	J1 League	0	0	0	0	0	0	0	0
Omiya Ardija	2017	J1 League	0	0	1	0	2	0	3	0
Tochigi SC	2017	J3 League	12	1	–		–		12	1
Grulla Morioka	2018	J3 League	29	6	0	0	–		29	6
Blaublitz Akita	2019	J3 League	22	7	1	0	–		23	7
Omiya Ardija	2020	J2 League	0	0	–		–		0	0
Omiya Ardija	2021	J2 League	0	0	0	0	0	0	0	0
Career total			63	14	2	0	2	0	67	14
