= Go Iwase =

Japanese footballer

Personal information
- Date of birth: 28 June 1995 (age 31)
- Place of birth: Kamagaya, Japan
- Height: 1.71 m (5 ft 7 1/2 in)
- Position: Defensive midfielder

Youth career
- 2011–2013: Ichiritsu Funabashi High School

Senior career*
| Years | Team | Apps | (Gls) |
| 2014–2019 | Kyoto Sanga | 29 | (0) |
| 2014 | → J. League U-22 (loan) | 6 | (0) |
| 2016–2017 | → FC Gifu (loan) | 36 | (0) |
| 2019 | → Thespakusatsu Gunma (loan) | 14 | (0) |
| 2020 | Thespakusatsu Gunma | 5 | (0) |
| 2021–2022 | Ansan Greeners | 48 | (1) |
- * Club domestic league appearances and goals as of 27 June 2021, 09:45 (UTC)

Go Iwase (磐瀬 剛, Iwase Gō; born 28 June 1995) is a Japanese professional footballer.

== Club career ==
Go Iwase joined the J2 League club Kyoto Sanga FC in 2014. In 2016, he moved to FC Gifu.

== Club statistics ==
As of the end of the 2018 season.

| Club performance | | | League | | Cup | | Total | |
| Season | Club | League | Apps | Goals | Apps | Goals | Apps | Goals |
| Japan | | | League | | Emperor's Cup | | Total | |
|---|---|---|---|---|---|---|---|---|
| 2014 | Kyoto Sanga | J2 League | 4 | 0 | 0 | 0 | 4 | 0 |
| 2015 | Kyoto Sanga | J2 League | 22 | 0 | 1 | 0 | 23 | 0 |
| 2016 | FC Gifu | J2 League | 30 | 0 | 0 | 0 | 30 | 0 |
| 2017 | FC Gifu | J2 League | 6 | 0 | 0 | 0 | 6 | 0 |
| 2018 | Kyoto Sanga | J2 League | 3 | 0 | 1 | 0 | 4 | 0 |
| Total | | | 65 | 0 | 2 | 0 | 67 | 0 |
