= Hiroki Sugajima =

Japanese footballer

Hiroki Sugajima 菅嶋 弘希
Personal information
- Full name: Hiroki Sugajima
- Date of birth: May 11, 1995 (age 31)
- Place of birth: Chōfu, Tokyo, Japan
- Height: 1.76 m (5 ft 9 1/2 in)
- Positions: Forward; midfielder

Team information
- Current team: Portimonense

Youth career
- 2008–2013: Tokyo Verdy Youth

Senior career*
Years	Team	Apps	(Gls)
2014–2019	Tokyo Verdy	30	(0)
2016–2018	→ JEF United Chiba (loan)	17	(0)
2019–	Portimonense	0	(0)
- * Club domestic league appearances and goals as of 3 January 2019

Hiroki Sugajima (菅嶋 弘希, Sugajima Hiroki; born May 11, 1995 in Chōfu, Tokyo) is a Japanese football player.

== Career ==
=== Tokyo Verdy ===
On 18 December 2018 it was confirmed, that Sugajima would be leaving the club at the end of 2018, where his contract expired.

== Club statistics ==
Updated to 10 December 2017.

Club performance			League		Cup		Total	
Season	Club	League	Apps	Goals	Apps	Goals	Apps	Goals
Japan			League		Emperor's Cup		Total	
2014	Tokyo Verdy	J2 League	21	0	0	0	21	0
2015	Tokyo Verdy	J2 League	8	0	0	0	8	0
2016	JEF United Chiba	J2 League	11	0	2	0	13	0
2017	JEF United Chiba	J2 League	6	0	0	0	6	0
Career total			46	0	2	0	48	0
