= Atsuto Tatara =

Japanese footballer

Personal information
- Date of birth: June 23, 1987 (age 39)
- Place of birth: Shizuoka, Japan
- Height: 1.80 m (5 ft 11 in)
- Position: Defender

Team information
- Current team: FC Maruyasu Okazaki
- Number: 33

Youth career
- 2006–2009: Shizuoka Sangyo University

Senior career*
Years	Team	Apps	(Gls)
2010–2014	Matsumoto Yamaga	159	(6)
2015	Vegalta Sendai	11	(1)
2016–2017	JEF United Chiba	30	(0)
2018	Roasso Kumamoto	14	(0)
2019–	FC Maruyasu Okazaki		
- * Club domestic league appearances and goals as of 22:37, 21 April 2019 (UTC)

Atsuto Tatara (多々良 敦斗, born June 23, 1987) is a Japanese football player who currently plays for FC Maruyasu Okazaki.

== Career ==
On 17 January 2019, Tatara joined FC Maruyasu Okazaki.

== Career statistics ==
Updated to 23 February 2019.

Appearances and goals by club, season and competition
Club	Season	League			Emperor's Cup		J.League Cup		Total	
Club	Season	Division	Apps	Goals	Apps	Goals	Apps	Goals	Apps	Goals
Matsumoto Yamaga	2010	JFL	23	0	2	0	—		25	0
Matsumoto Yamaga	2011	JFL	26	1	3	1	—		29	2
Matsumoto Yamaga	2012	J2 League	42	3	1	0	—		43	3
Matsumoto Yamaga	2013	J2 League	42	1	2	0	—		44	1
Matsumoto Yamaga	2014	J2 League	26	1	1	0	—		27	1
Vegalta Sendai	2015	J1 League	11	1	1	0	3	0	15	1
JEF United Chiba	2016	J2 League	22	0	0	0	—		22	0
JEF United Chiba	2017	J2 League	8	0	1	0	—		9	0
Roasso Kumamoto	2018	J2 League	14	0	0	0	—		14	0
Career total			214	7	11	1	3	0	228	8
