= Allan (footballer, born 1989) =

Brazilian footballer

Personal information
- Full name: Allan dos Santos Natividade
- Date of birth: February 20, 1989 (age 37)
- Place of birth: Rio de Janeiro, Brazil
- Height: 1.78 m (5 ft 10 in)
- Position: Forward

Team information
- Current team: Esperanza

Youth career
- 2005–2007: Japan Aviation High School

Senior career*
Years	Team	Apps	(Gls)
2008–2012	MIO Biwako Shiga	110	(23)
2013–2017	Kamatamare Sanuki	94	(1)
2018–2019	Zweigen Kanazawa	0	(0)
2020–	Esperanza	8	(0)
- * Club domestic league appearances and goals as of 19:05, 15 March 2021 (UTC)

Allan dos Santos Natividade (born February 20, 1989) is a Brazilian football player for Esperanza.

== Club statistics ==
Updated to end of 2018 season.

Club performance			League		Cup		Total	
Season	Club	League	Apps	Goals	Apps	Goals	Apps	Goals
Japan			League		Emperor's Cup		Total	
2008	MIO Biwako Shiga	JFL	28	9	–		28	9
2009	MIO Biwako Shiga	JFL	18	3	–		18	3
2010	MIO Biwako Shiga	JFL	16	2	1	0	17	2
2011	MIO Biwako Shiga	JFL	19	1	–		19	1
2012	MIO Biwako Shiga	JFL	29	8	–		29	8
2013	Kamatamare Sanuki	JFL	17	1	0	0	17	1
2014	Kamatamare Sanuki	J2 League	12	0	0	0	12	0
2015	Kamatamare Sanuki	J2 League	7	0	0	0	7	0
2016	Kamatamare Sanuki	J2 League	15	0	2	0	17	0
2017	Kamatamare Sanuki	J2 League	14	0	1	0	15	0
2018	Zweigen Kanazawa	J2 League	0	0	0	0	0	0
Career total			204	24	4	0	208	24
