= Masato Kurogi =

Japanese footballer

Masato Kurogi 黒木 聖仁
Personal information
- Full name: Masato Kurogi
- Date of birth: 24 October 1989 (age 37)
- Place of birth: Nobeoka, Miyazaki, Japan
- Height: 1.80 m (5 ft 11 in)
- Position: Midfielder

Team information
- Current team: Kataller Toyama
- Number: 3

Youth career
- 2005–2007: Nissho Gakuen High School

Senior career*
| Years | Team | Apps | (Gls) |
| 2008–2014 | Cerezo Osaka | 56 | (4) |
| 2014–2015 | V-Varen Nagasaki | 58 | (2) |
| 2016–2017 | Ventforet Kofu | 32 | (2) |
| 2018–2019 | V-Varen Nagasaki | 33 | (0) |
| 2020 | Kyoto Sanga | 6 | (0) |
| 2021– | Kataller Toyama | 0 | (0) |
Medal record
Representing Japan
Asian Games
| Gold medal – first place | 2010 Guangzhou | Team |
- * Club domestic league appearances and goals as of 16:29, 24 April 2021 (UTC)

Masato Kurogi (黒木 聖仁, Kurogi Masato; born 24 October 1989 in Miyazaki) is a Japanese football player currently playing for Kataller Toyama.

== Club career stats ==
Updated to 28 February 2019.

| Club performance | | | League | | Cup | | League Cup | | Continental | | Total | |
| Season | Club | League | Apps | Goals | Apps | Goals | Apps | Goals | Apps | Goals | Apps | Goals |
| Japan | | | League | | Emperor's Cup | | J. League Cup | | AFC | | Total | |
|---|---|---|---|---|---|---|---|---|---|---|---|---|
| 2008 | Cerezo Osaka | J2 League | 1 | 0 | 0 | 0 | - | - | - | - | 1 | 0 |
| 2009 | Cerezo Osaka | J2 League | 34 | 3 | 1 | 0 | - | - | - | - | 35 | 3 |
| 2010 | Cerezo Osaka | J1 League | 7 | 1 | 0 | 0 | 3 | 0 | - | - | 10 | 1 |
| 2011 | Cerezo Osaka | J1 League | 5 | 0 | 1 | 0 | 1 | 0 | 0 | 0 | 7 | 0 |
| 2012 | Cerezo Osaka | J1 League | 8 | 0 | 1 | 0 | 4 | 0 | - | - | 13 | 0 |
| 2013 | Cerezo Osaka | J1 League | 1 | 0 | 1 | 0 | 0 | 0 | - | - | 2 | 0 |
| 2014 | Cerezo Osaka | J1 League | 0 | 0 | 0 | 0 | 0 | 0 | 0 | 0 | 0 | 0 |
| 2014 | V-Varen Nagasaki | J2 League | 24 | 1 | 1 | 0 | – | | – | | 25 | 1 |
| 2015 | V-Varen Nagasaki | J2 League | 34 | 1 | 1 | 0 | – | | – | | 35 | 1 |
| 2016 | Ventforet Kofu | J1 League | 26 | 2 | 1 | 0 | 3 | 0 | – | | 30 | 2 |
| 2017 | Ventforet Kofu | J1 League | 6 | 0 | 0 | 0 | 2 | 0 | – | | 8 | 0 |
| 2018 | V-Varen Nagasaki | J1 League | 21 | 0 | 1 | 0 | 1 | 0 | – | | 23 | 0 |
| Career total | | | 161 | 8 | 8 | 0 | 14 | 0 | 0 | 0 | 189 | 8 |
