= 2026–27 J3 League =

Japanese association football league season

J3 League
- Season: 2026–27
- Dates: 8 August 2026 – May 2027
- Matches: 180
- Goals: 498 (2.77 per match)
- Top goalscorer: Yuki Okada (13 goals)
- Biggest home win: FC Gifu 7–0 Kōchi United (15 August 2026)
- Biggest away win: Kōchi United 0–4 FC Osaka (26 September 2026); Reilac Shiga 1–5 Zweigen Kanazawa (25 October 2026); Matsumoto Yamaga 1–5 Ryukyu Okinawa (21 November 2026); Nara Club 0–4 SC Sagamihara (21 November 2026)
- Longest winning run: Nara Club (6 games)
- Longest unbeaten run: Kagoshima United and Nara Club (9 games)
- Longest winless run: Kochi United (11 games)
- Longest losing run: Kamatamare Sanuki and Kochi United (6 games)
- Highest attendance: 12,707; Giravanz Kitakyushu 2–0 Kōchi United (3 October 2026)
- Lowest attendance: 696; Kamatamare Sanuki 3–1 Zweigen Kanazawa (21 October 2026)
- Total attendance: 762,105
- Average attendance: 4,234
- All statistics correct as of 22 November 2026.

The 2026–27 J3 League, also known as the 2026/27 Meiji Yasuda J3 League (Japanese: 2026/27シーズン 明治安田J3リーグ, Hepburn: 2026/27 Shīzun Meiji Yasuda J3 Rīgu) for sponsorship reasons, is the 13th season of the J3 League, the third-tier Japanese professional league for men's association football clubs, since its establishment in 2013.

== Overview ==
=== General ===
This marked the first J3 League season scheduled with a summer-to-spring format with 20 teams will compete in the league – the sixteen teams from the previous season, three teams relegated from the J2 League and one team promoted from Japan Football League.

The top two teams in the league are automatically promoted to the J2 League, teams ranked 3rd to 6th advance to the promotion play-offs. There is the possibility that as many as two clubs will be relegated to the Japan Football League.

Promotion from the JFL is conditional on holding a valid J3 license. If the JFL champions hold a license, the club is automatically promoted and the J3's 20th-placed team is automatically relegated. If the JFL runners-up hold a license, the club needs to play promotion/relegation play-offs against J3's 19th or 20th-placed team for the season, depending on whether the JFL champions hold the J3 license. The club(s) who do not hold a license cannot be promoted and no teams are relegated from the J3 League.

=== Teams relegated from J2 League ===
Ehime FC became the first team to be relegated on 26 October 2025 after being defeated by Júbilo Iwata in matchweek 34, returning them to the third division after spending two seasons in J2.

Kataller Toyama's victory over Blaublitz Akita in the final matchweek on 29 November 2025, resulted in the relegation of Renofa Yamaguchi and Roasso Kumamoto. Renofa Yamaguchi were relegated after nine seasons in the second division despite a win over RB Omiya Ardija, while Roasso Kumamoto were held to a goalless draw by Ventforet Kofu resulted in their relegation after four seasons in the second division.

=== Teams promoted to J2 League ===
Tochigi City became the first team to be promoted on 23 November 2025 after defeating Nagano Parceiro in matchweek 37. This result made it their second consecutive promotion after previously being promoted from JFL to J3.

Vanraure Hachinohe became the second team to be promoted after spending seven seasons in the third division. This was confirmed after holding Ryukyu Okinawa to a draw in the final matchweek on 29 November 2025.

Tegevajaro Miyazaki became the last team to secure promotion after defeating FC Osaka in the final round of the promotion playoff on 14 December 2025, ending their five-season stay in the third division.

=== Result from playoff ===
Reilac Shiga became the only team promoted from the JFL and the first team from Shiga to compete in the J.League. In the playoffs held on 14 December 2025, they defeated Azul Claro Numazu with a 4-3 aggregate score, relegating the Shizuoka-based team after eight seasons in the third division.

== Teams ==
=== Team changes ===
The following teams changed division since the 2025 season.

To J3 League
▼ Relegated from J2 League
- Renofa Yamaguchi
- Roasso Kumamoto
- Ehime
▲ Promoted from JFL
- Reilac Shiga

From J3 League
▲ Promoted to J2 League
- Tochigi City
- Vanraure Hachinohe
- Tegevajaro Miyazaki
▼ Relegated to JFL
- Azul Claro Numazu

=== Location and stadium ===
Locations of teams in the 2026–27 J3 League.

Team	Location	Stadium	Capacity	2025 season	License
Ehime^{↓}	Matsuyama	Ningineer Stadium	20,919	20th in J2	J1
FC Gifu	Gifu	Gifu Nagaragawa Stadium	16,310	13th in J3	J1
FC Osaka	Higashiōsaka	Hanazono Rugby Stadium	27,346	3rd in J3	J2
Fukushima United	Fukushima	Toho Stadium	15,454	10th in J3	J2
Gainare Tottori	Tottori	Axis Bird Stadium	16,033	11th in J3	J2
Giravanz Kitakyushu	Kitakyushu	Mikuni World Stadium Kitakyushu	15,300	8th in J3	J1
Kagoshima United	Kagoshima	Shiranami Stadium	19,934	5th in J3	J1
Kamatamare Sanuki	Marugame	Shikoku Kasei Meglio Stadium	30,099	17th in J3	J1
Kochi United	Kōchi	Kochi Haruno Athletic Stadium	25,000	18th in J3	J3
Matsumoto Yamaga	Matsumoto	Sunpro Alwin	20,000	15th in J3	J1
Nagano Parceiro	Nagano	Nagano U Stadium	15,515	19th in J3	J2
Nara Club	Nara	Rohto Field Nara	30,600	15th in J3	J2
Reilac Shiga^{↑}	Hikone	Heiwado HATO Stadium	6,444	2nd in JFL	J3
Renofa Yamaguchi^{↓}	Yamaguchi	Ishin Me-Life Stadium	15,115	19th in J2	J1
Roasso Kumamoto^{↓}	Kumamoto	Egao Kenko Stadium	30,275	18th in J2	J1
Ryukyu Okinawa	Okinawa	Okinawa Athletic Park Stadium	10,189	16th in J3	J1
SC Sagamihara	Sagamihara	Sagamihara Gion Stadium	6,291	12th in J3	J2
Thespa Gunma	Maebashi	Shoda Shoyu Stadium Gunma	15,253	14th in J3	J1
Tochigi SC	Utsunomiya	Kanseki Stadium Tochigi	25,244	7th in J3	J1
Zweigen Kanazawa	Kanazawa	Kanazawa Go Go Curry Stadium	10,444	6th in J3	J1

^{↓}	Relegated from the J2 League
^{↑}	Promoted from the Japan Football League

=== Personnel and kits ===
Note: Flags indicate national team as has been defined under FIFA eligibility rules. Players and coaches may hold more than one non-FIFA nationality.

Team	Manager	Captain	Kit manufacturer	Kit sponsors	
Team	Manager	Captain	Kit manufacturer	Main	Other(s)
Ehime	(Japan national football team) Takeshi Oki	(Japan national football team) Yutaka Soneda	(Japan) Jogarbola	ra shink Ningineer	List: Front: Benefit one, EHIMEFC empowers AOASHI; Back: Iyogin Holdings; Sleeves: MIURA; Shorts: FUJI
FC Gifu	(Japan national football team) Kiyotaka Ishimaru	(Japan national football team) Akito Fukuta	(Japan) Razzoli	Hot Staff	List: Front: None; Back: None; Sleeves: Gifu; Shorts: None
FC Osaka	(Japan national football team) Mitsunori Yabuta	(Japan national football team) Shunsuke Tachino	(Japan) Bonera	Daisue Construction	List: Front: TATAUTA, DS Japan; Back: Ito Kampo Pharmaceutical, CASHIER; Sleeves: Actim; Shorts: Updater Inc.
Fukushima United	(Japan national football team) Shuhei Terada	(Japan national football team) Hiroki Higuchi	(Denmark) Hummel	SportsX	List: Front: None; Back:Jin Luck; Sleeves: Fukushima; Shorts: None
Gainare Tottori	(Japan national football team) Kentaro Hayashi	(Japan national football team) Shinya Yajima	(China) TLSS	Gougin; DanDan BANK	List: Front: Enetopia, Oyama Chicken; Back: Sanko Group, Nakaumi Television Broadcasting; Sleeves: TIC; Shorts: AXiS, Local Energy
Giravanz Kitakyushu	(Japan national football team) Ryotaro Tanaka	(Japan national football team) Daigo Takahashi	(England) Umbro	YASAKAWA	List: Front: WingArc1st; Back: TOTO, Benevita Capital; Sleeves: Nafco; Shorts: Mitsui High-Tec, BOAT RACE Wakamatsu, Green Shipping
Kagoshima United	(Japan national football team) Hiromasa Suguri	(Japan national football team) Shuto Inaba	(Japan) Angua	Nishihara Trading Company	List: Front: GMO Pepabo, Satsuma Island Beauty; Back: SNBL New Japan Science, NANWA; Sleeves: NEO; Shorts: Kagoshima Toyopet
Kamatamare Sanuki	(Japan national football team) Naoto Otake	(Japan national football team) Akito Ueno	(England) Umbro	Rexxam	List: Front: None; Back: None; Sleeves: Kagawa; Shorts: None
Kōchi United	(Japan national football team) Takahiro Shimotaira	(Japan national football team) Daichi Kobayashi	(Brazil) Athleta	Kōchi	List: Front: None; Back: None; Sleeves: Casio; Shorts: None
Matsumoto Yamaga	(Japan national football team) Nobuhiro Ishizaki	(Japan national football team) Taiki Miyabe	(Germany) Adidas	Epson	List: Front: None; Back: None; Sleeves: None; Shorts: None
Nagano Parceiro	(Japan national football team) Shinji Kobayashi	(Japan national football team) Yuya Tsukegi	(Brazil) Penalty	Hokio	List: Front: None; Back: None; Sleeves: None; Shorts: None
Nara Club	(Japan national football team) Masashi Oguro	(Japan national football team) Rin Morita	(Japan) Squadra	Daiwa House Group	List: Front: Bangkok Glass, MARU; Back: MJE Inc.; Sleeves: None; Shorts: None
Reilac Shiga	(Japan national football team) Makoto Kakuda	(Japan national football team) Atsushi Nabeta	(Japan) DEZ	Rei Beauty	List: Front: Dr. Melon, North River Group; Back: Romarin; Sleeves: Hikonyan; Shorts: None
Renofa Yamaguchi	(Japan national football team) Michiharu Otagiri	(Japan national football team) Yūji Wakasa	(Brazil) FInta Futebol	UPR	List: Front: Fuji Robotics; Back: None; Sleeves: None; Shorts: None
Roasso Kumamoto	(Japan national football team) Tomohiro Katanosaka	(Japan national football team) Yuya Sato	(England) Admiral	Hirata	List: Front: RKKCS; Back: Yusen Logistics; Sleeves: None; Shorts: None
Ryukyu Okinawa	(Japan national football team) Tadaaki Hirakawa	(Japan national football team) Junya Suzuki	(Japan) SFIDA	KAYAC	List: Front: infomart, UnIOn; Back: Onoken, JTA; Sleeves: Ryukyu Bank; Shorts: Naha Steel SUUMO
SC Sagamihara	(Japan national football team) Yuki Richard Stalph	(Japan national football team) Toshio Shimakawa	(England) Umbro	Gion	List: Front: MEIKO Ocean Construction; Back: Housing Information Center, Toyota Mobility Kanagawa; Sleeves: AIDA; Shorts: umios, OKUBO GEAR
Thespa Gunma	(Japan national football team) Mitsumasa Yoda	(Japan national football team) Shusuke Yonehara	(Japan) ATHLETADENHAM	CAINZ	List: Front: Sunwa; Back: Farmdo Group, Beisia; Sleeves: Gunma; Shorts: None
Tochigi SC	(Japan national football team) Yoshimi Hamasaki	(Japan national football team) Yasutaka Yanagi	(Brazil) Athleta	TKC	List: Front: Ashikaga Bank, INVERSENET; Back: Kawachi Pharmacy, Tokyo Lime Industry; Sleeves: Eatland; Shorts: Kita-Sōkai, Iwamura Construction
Zweigen Kanazawa	(Japan national football team) Masateru Tsujita	(Japan national football team) Norimichi Yamamoto	(Denmark) Hummel	STS System Support	List: Front: Hokkoku Shimbun; Back: Hokkoku Bank, Ascom Job Postings; Sleeves: Yonezawa Electric; Shorts: AOC, K.S.D. Tax Accountant Corporation

=== Managerial changes ===
==== Pre-season ====
Team	Outgoing manager	Manner	Date of vacancy	Replaced by	Date of arrival
Ehime	(Japan) Shinya Aono	End of interim spell	1 December 2025	(Japan) Takeshi Oki	7 December 2025
Renofa Yamaguchi	(Japan) Genki Nakayama	End of contract	1 December 2025	(Japan) Michiharu Otagiri	8 December 2025
Nara Club	(Japan) Michiharu Otagiri	End of contract	8 December 2025	(Japan) Masashi Oguro	14 December 2025
Roasso Kumamoto	(Japan) Takeshi Oki	End of contract	1 December 2025	(Japan) Tomohiro Katanosaka	1 January 2026

==== During the season ====
Team	Outgoing manager	Manner	Date of vacancy	Position in table	Replaced by	Date of arrival
Thespa Gunma	Masaru Okita	Sacked	14 September 2026	20th	Mitsumasa Yoda	14 September 2026
Tochigi SC	Atsushi Yoneyama	Sacked	11 October 2026	15th	Yoshimi Hamasaki	12 October 2026

== Foreign players ==
From the 2021 season onwards, there are no limitations on signing foreign players, but clubs could only register up to five of them for a single matchday squad. Players from J.League partner nations (Thailand, Vietnam, Myanmar, Malaysia, Cambodia, Singapore, Indonesia, and Qatar) were exempted from these restrictions.

- Players name in **bold** indicates the player is registered during the winter transfer window.
- Player's name in italics indicates the player has Japanese nationality in addition to their FIFA nationality, holds the nationality of a J.League partner nation, or is exempt from being treated as a foreign player due to having been born in Japan and being enrolled in, or having graduated from an approved type of school in the country.

Team	Player 1	Player 2	Player 3	Player 4	Player 5	Player 6	Player 7	Former players
Ehime FC	(Nigeria) Adeola David							
FC Gifu	(Republic of the Congo) Bevic Moussiti-Oko	(North Korea) Mun In-ju	(South Korea) Jung Hyeon-ho	(South Korea) Kim Yu-geon	(Guadeloupe) Jordan Tell	(Ivory Coast) Kouadio-Yves Dabila		
FC Osaka	(Brazil) Rigley	(Brazil) Vinícius	(South Korea) Han Jun-young	(South Korea) Lee Han-hee	(South Korea) Ma Sang-hoon	(South Korea) Shin Kyu-won	(United States) Johnny Angelini	
Fukushima United	(South Korea) Jung Sung-ryong							
Gainare Tottori	(Canada) Shawn van Eerden	(New Zealand) Marco Lorenz	(North Korea) Chon San-yon	(South Korea) Moon Min	(United States) Anton Burns			
Giravanz Kitakyushu	(South Korea) Koh Seung-jin							
Kagoshima United	(Brazil) Thales Paula	(South Korea) Kim Moon-hyeon						
Kamatamare Sanuki	(South Korea) Kang Dong-won	(South Korea) Kim Do-hoon	(South Korea) Lee Gi-san	(South Korea) Lee Jin-yeong	(South Korea) Park Tae-yang	(South Korea) Woo Sang-ho		
Kochi United	(Nigeria) Origbaajo Ismaila							
Matsumoto Yamaga	(South Korea) Kim Jun-hyun	(South Korea) Lee To-bin						
Nagano Parceiro								
Nara Club	(Nigeria) Dayo Olasunkanmi	(Spain) Marc Vito	(Thailand) Nanthiphat Chaiman	(Thailand) Siwakorn Ponsan				
Reilac Shiga	(Peru) Frank Romero							
Renofa Yamaguchi	(South Korea) Choi Hyung-chan							
Roasso Kumamoto	(North Korea) Ri Tae-ha	(South Korea) Bae Jeong-min						
Ryukyu Okinawa	(Brazil) Vavá	(Sierra Leone) Mohamed Bai Kamara	(South Korea) Lee Chung-won	(United States) Cal Jennings				
SC Sagamihara	(Poland) Kevin Pytlik	(South Korea) Kim Min-ho	(Thailand) Thanawut Phochai					
Thespa Gunma	(France) Sylvain Deslandes	(Netherlands) Yuya Ikeshita	(Singapore) Ikhsan Fandi	(South Korea) Kim Gun-il	(South Korea) Kim Je-hee	(South Korea) Song Min-seob		
Tochigi SC	(Nigeria) Kenneth Otabor							
Zweigen Kanazawa	(Brazil) Patric							

=== Foreign players by confederation ===
Foreign players by confederation
AFC	North Korea (3), Singapore (1), South Korea (25), Thailand (3)
CAF	Congo (1), Ivory Coast (1), Nigeria (4), Sierra Leone (1)
CONCACAF	Canada (1), Guadeloupe (1), United States (3)
CONMEBOL	Brazil (5), Peru (1)
OFC	New Zealand (1)
UEFA	France (1), Netherlands (1), Poland (1), Spain (1)

== Standings ==
=== League table ===
Pos	Team	Pld	W	D	L	GF	GA	GD	Pts	Promotion, qualification or relegation
1	FC Gifu	18	11	2	5	31	16	+15	35	Promotion to J2 League
2	SC Sagamihara	18	10	4	4	30	16	+14	34	Promotion to J2 League
3	Renofa Yamaguchi	18	10	4	4	24	14	+10	34	Qualification for the Promotion playoff
4	FC Osaka	18	9	6	3	31	17	+14	33	Qualification for the Promotion playoff
5	Nara Club	18	10	2	6	33	26	+7	32	Qualification for the Promotion playoff
6	Kagoshima United	18	9	5	4	29	22	+7	32	Qualification for the Promotion playoff
7	Ryukyu Okinawa	18	9	2	7	30	25	+5	29	
8	Ehime	18	9	2	7	32	28	+4	29	
9	Nagano Parceiro	18	9	2	7	26	22	+4	29	
10	Zweigen Kanazawa	18	8	3	7	31	23	+8	27	
11	Roasso Kumamoto	18	7	6	5	21	15	+6	27	
12	Tochigi SC	18	7	6	5	18	16	+2	27	
13	Fukushima United	18	6	4	8	35	36	−1	22	
14	Giravanz Kitakyushu	18	6	4	8	25	28	−3	22	
15	Matsumoto Yamaga	18	4	6	8	16	23	−7	18	
16	Reilac Shiga	18	5	3	10	20	30	−10	18	
17	Gainare Tottori	18	5	3	10	19	33	−14	18	
18	Kamatamare Sanuki	18	4	3	11	18	31	−13	15	
19	Thespa Gunma	18	4	1	13	16	37	−21	13	Qualification for the Relegation playoff (Note: Only applied if top two teams in JFL obtaining a J.League license.)
20	Kochi United	18	2	4	12	13	40	−27	10	Relegation to the Japan Football League

Updated to match(es) played on 22 November 2026. Source: J3 League Football Zone
Rules for classification: 1) Points; 2) Goal difference; 3) Goals scored; 4) Head-to-head points; 5) Head-to-head goal difference; 6) Head-to-head goal scored; 7) Fair-play points.

=== Position by round ===
Team ╲ Round	1	2	3	4	5	6	7	8	9	10	11	12	13	14	15	16	17	18	19	20	21	22	23	24	25	26	27	28	29	30	31	32	33	34	35	36	37	38
Ehime	1	2	2	2	1	2	2	2	2	1	2	2	2	2	7	7	7	8																				
FC Gifu	2	1	1	1	3	4	9	6	8	7	6	5	7	5	3	2	1	1																				
FC Osaka	7	5	7	6	7	6	3	3	5	6	7	7	4	8	6	6	6	4																				
Fukushima United	14	18	19	20	14	16	19	16	17	18	18	17	14	16	16	14	14	13																				
Gainare Tottori	8	15	10	5	10	8	12	13	11	12	13	14	13	15	17	17	17	17																				
Giravanz Kitakyushu	19	13	15	16	19	19	15	17	15	16	14	16	12	12	12	13	13	14																				
Kagoshima United	6	3	4	3	2	1	1	1	1	2	1	1	1	1	1	4	5	6																				
Kamatamare Sanuki	4	7	9	12	17	18	20	20	19	19	19	19	19	19	19	18	18	18																				
Kochi United	11	16	11	15	18	15	18	19	20	20	20	20	20	20	20	20	20	20																				
Matsumoto Yamaga	10	14	16	17	16	17	17	15	16	13	15	12	15	13	14	15	15	15																				
Nagano Parceiro	5	10	5	7	9	12	7	11	12	11	9	9	11	11	10	10	9	9																				
Nara Club	17	20	14	14	13	13	8	5	4	4	4	4	6	4	2	1	2	5																				
Reilac Shiga	18	11	6	8	4	10	5	9	10	10	11	13	17	17	15	16	16	16																				
Renofa Yamaguchi	16	9	13	13	8	7	4	4	3	3	3	3	3	3	5	5	4	3																				
Roasso Kumamoto	12	12	17	9	11	9	10	7	7	9	8	8	5	7	8	8	11	11																				
Ryukyu Okinawa	20	17	18	11	15	5	11	10	13	14	12	10	9	9	9	11	10	7																				
SC Sagamihara	9	4	3	4	5	3	6	8	6	5	5	6	8	6	4	3	3	2																				
Thespa Gunma	15	19	20	19	20	20	16	18	18	17	17	18	18	18	18	19	19	19																				
Tochigi	3	6	8	10	6	11	13	14	14	15	16	15	16	14	13	12	12	12																				
Zweigen Kanazawa	13	8	12	18	12	14	14	12	9	8	10	11	10	10	11	9	8	10																				

Promotion to the J2 League
Qualification for the promotion play-off
Qualification for the relegation play-off
Relegation to the Japan Football League

Updated to match(es) played on 22 November 2026. Source: J3 League

== Results ==
=== Fixtures and results ===
Home \ Away	EHI	FCG	FCO	FHU	GNT	GRV	KGU	KMM	KCU	MTY	NGP	NRC	RLC	RNF	RKM	RYU	SCS	THG	TSC	ZKN
Ehime		1–2		2–4	4–0	4–2		2–1				4–1	1–0	2–1				3–1		
FC Gifu			1–0	1–0		1–0			7–0	0–0				0–2			2–1		4–1	0–1
FC Osaka	2–1			4–1			2–1	3–0			4–2	2–0			2–1	2–2				1–1
Fukushima United						2–1		1–2		1–3	4–3	2–2	2–2		1–2	4–1	1–0			
Gainare Tottori		0–1	1–1	2–1					0–0		1–3	2–3		0–3			0–1	1–1	0–1	
Giravanz Kitakyushu			3–1		2–4		1–1	0–0	2–0	1–1	3–1		0–1					4–3		
Kagoshima United	4–2	0–0		3–2	0–3				3–1						1–1	2–1		1–0	3–1	
Kamatamare Sanuki		3–4					3–4			1–0		0–2	0–3	1–1	0–3				0–0	3–1
Kochi United	4–0		0–4	3–3				2–1		0–0	1–3				0–2		1–3			1–1
Matsumoto Yamaga	2–2		0–0		0–1		1–0						2–3	0–2		1–5	1–3	2–0		0–1
Nagano Parceiro	1–0	1–0						0–1		2–1		0–1	3–1	1–0		0–1		1–2	1–1	
Nara Club		2–1				2–0	1–3		5–0				4–1	3–1		1–3	0–4	3–0		
Reilac Shiga		0–3	1–1		0–1		1–2								0–0	3–0	0–2			1–5
Renofa Yamaguchi			0–0			0–2	1–1		2–0				1–0			1–0	2–2	2–0		
Roasso Kumamoto	0–2	2–1			3–0	1–0				0–0	0–1	2–2		1–2					0–0	
Ryukyu Okinawa	1–1	2–3			5–2	3–0		1–0	1–0								2–1		1–0	0–2
SC Sagamihara			1–0			1–2	1–0	3–2			1–1				0–0				0–0	2–1
Thespa Gunma			1–2	1–3				1–0	1–0				2–3		0–1	2–1	1–4		0–2	
Tochigi SC	2–0			0–0		2–2			2–0	1–2		1–0	1–0	0–1						3–2
Zweigen Kanazawa	0–1			4–3	4–1		0–0				0–2	0–1		1–2	3–2			4–0		

Updated to match(es) played on 22 November 2026. Source: J3 League
Legend: Blue = home team win; Yellow = draw; Red = away team win.
For upcoming matches, an "a" indicates there is an article about the rivalry between the two participants.

=== Results by round ===
Team ╲ Round	1	2	3	4	5	6	7	8	9	10	11	12	13	14	15	16	17	18	19	20	21	22	23	24	25	26	27	28	29	30	31	32	33	34	35	36	37	38	39
Ehime	W	W	D	W	W	L	W	D	W	W	L	W	L	L	L	W	L	L																					
FC Gifu	W	W	D	W	L	L	L	W	L	W	W	W	L	W	W	W	D	W																					
FC Osaka	D	W	D	D	D	W	W	W	L	D	L	W	W	L	W	W	D	W																					
Fukushima United	L	L	L	D	W	L	L	W	L	D	L	W	W	L	D	W	W	D																					
Gainare Tottori	D	L	W	W	L	W	L	L	W	L	D	L	D	L	L	L	W	L																					
Giravanz Kitakyushu	L^{†}	D	D	D	L	L	W	D	W	L	W	L	W	W	L	L	W	L																					
Kagoshima United	W	W	D	W	W	W	W	D	W	L	W	W	L	D	D	L	L	D																					
Kamatamare Sanuki	W	D	L	L	L	L	L	L	D	L	L	W	L	L	W	W	D	L																					
Kochi United	D	L	W	L	L	D	L	L	L	L	L	L	D	L	W	L	L	D																					
Matsumoto Yamaga	D	L	D	D	D	L	D	W	L	W	L	W	L	W	L	L	D	L																					
Nagano Parceiro	W	L	W	L	D	D	W	L	L	W	W	L	L	W	W	L	W	W																					
Nara Club	L	L	W	D	D	W	W	W	W	W	W	L	L	W	W	W	L	L																					
Reilac Shiga	L	W	W	L	W	L	W	L	D	D	L	L	L	L	W	L	D	L																					
Renofa Yamaguchi	L	W	L	D	W	W	W	D	W	W	W	L	W	L	D	W	D	W																					
Roasso Kumamoto	D	D	L	W	D	W	D	W	D	L	W	W	W	D	L	L	L	W																					
Ryukyu Okinawa	W^{†}	L	D	W	L	W	L	D	L	L	W	W	W	W	L	L	W	W																					
SC Sagamihara	D	W	W	L	D	W	L	D	W	W	W	L	D	W	W	W	L	W																					
Thespa Gunma	L	L	L	W	L	L	W	L	L	W	D	L	W	L	L	L	L	L																					
Tochigi	W	D	D	L	W	D	L	L	D	L	L	W	D	W	D	W	W	W																					
Zweigen Kanazawa	L	W	L	L	W	D	L	W	W	D	L	L	W	W	L	W	W	D																					

Updated to match(es) played on 22 November 2026. Source: J3 League

Notes:

- ^{†} The Ryukyu Okinawa vs Giravanz Kitakyushu match was originally scheduled to be played on 8 August 2026, but was postponed due to impact of Typhoon No. 13. The match was rescheduled and was played on 9 September 2026.

== Playoffs ==
=== Promotion playoff ===
Based on the J3 placements at the end of the regular season, the third-placed team played against the sixth-placed, while the fourth-placed team played against the fifth-placed. The winners of the semi-finals played the final, with the winners promoted to the J2.

If a match was tied in the play-offs, the team with the highest league position are declared the winner. The rank order was: J3's third, fourth, fifth, and sixth-placed teams.

Semi-finals
3	'
6
4
5

Final

==== Matches ====
Semifinals

2027	3th-placed of J3 League	v	6th-placed of J3 League
--:-- UTC+9

2027	4th-placed of J3 League	v	5th-placed of J3 League
--:-- UTC+9

Final

2027	Winner of Semifinal 1	v	Winner of Semifinal 2
--:-- UTC+9

=== Relegation playoff ===
==== Summary ====
Team 1	Agg.	Team 2	1st leg	2nd leg
19th-placed of J3 League	PO	2nd-placed of Japan Football League	TBD	TBD

==== Matches ====
First leg

2027	2nd-placed of JFL	v	19th-placed of J3 League
--:-- UTC+9

Second leg

2027	19th-placed of J3 League	v	2nd-placed of JFL
--:-- UTC+9

== Attendances ==
=== Overall ===
Pos	Team	Total	High	Low	Average	Change
1	Ehime	32,745	5,155	1,767	3,638	n/a^{†}
2	FC Gifu	53,124	10,453	2,309	5,903	n/a
3	FC Osaka	21,326	4,298	799	2,370	n/a
4	Fukushima United	21,723	5,860	1,323	2,414	n/a
5	Gainare Tottori	24,190	3,960	1,043	2,419	n/a
6	Giravanz Kitakyushu	48,614	12,707	3,040	5,402	n/a
7	Kagoshima United	69,038	12,436	4,447	7,671	n/a
8	Kamatamare Sanuki	17,684	3,354	696	1,965	n/a
9	Kochi United	20,202	3,552	1,196	2,245	n/a
10	Matsumoto Yamaga	79,534	12,556	3,916	7,953	n/a
11	Nagano Parceiro	50,708	10,715	2,626	5,071	n/a
12	Nara Club	19,132	3,966	1,402	2,126	n/a
13	Reilac Shiga	22,103	6,852	1,187	2,763	n/a^{‡}
14	Renofa Yamaguchi	53,072	10,976	2,815	6,634	n/a^{†}
15	Roasso Kumamoto	45,541	10,239	2,917	5,060	n/a^{†}
16	Ryukyu Okinawa	27,144	11,359	1,026	3,016	n/a
17	SC Sagamihara	32,721	9,862	1,770	4,090	n/a
18	Thespa Gunma	31,474	5,612	1,941	3,497	n/a
19	Tochigi SC	48,672	8,224	3,338	5,408	n/a
20	Zweigen Kanazawa	43,358	8,686	2,934	4,818	n/a
	League total	762,105	12,707	696	4,234	n/a

Updated to games played on 22 November 2026
Source: J3 League
Notes:
^{†} Teams played previous season in J2 League
^{‡} Teams played previous season in Japan Football League

=== Home match played ===
Team \ Match played	1	2	3	4	5	6	7	8	9	10	11	12	13	14	15	16	17	18	19	Total
Ehime FC	4,692	5,155	3,128	4,271	3,007	1,767	3,542	4,448	2,735											32,745
FC Gifu	10,453	5,020	6,173	7,789	4,014	2,309	3,673	6,631	7,062											53,124
FC Osaka	4,229	894	1,893	2,818	799	1,970	4,298	830	3,595											21,326
Fukushima United	3,171	5,860	1,504	1,323	1,410	2,141	2,411	1,803	2,100											21,723
Gainare Tottori	3,960	2,565	2,632	2,017	3,071	2,398	3,688	1,342	1,474	1,043										24,190
Giravanz Kitakyushu	7,817	4,693	3,731	5,433	12,707	3,365	3,040	4,614	3,214											48,614
Kagoshima United	8,941	12,436	5,627	7,024	7,686	7,529	4,447	9,324	6,024											69,038
Kamatamare Sanuki	3,354	2,237	1,652	1,195	1,615	696	1,914	3,051	1,970											17,684
Kōchi United	2,830	3,552	2,434	1,757	1,196	1,739	1,397	2,329	2,968											20,202
Matsumoto Yamaga	9,926	12,556	7,568	7,101	7,245	7,924	3,916	5,556	7,035	10,707										79,534
Nagano Parceiro	6,475	4,332	2,967	6,797	3,280	10,715	6,291	3,269	3,956	2,626										50,708
Nara Club	3,966	2,319	1,987	1,858	2,084	1,402	2,218	1,717	1,581											19,132
Reilac Shiga	6,852	2,085	2,448	2,871	1,187	2,112	2,964	1,584												22,103
Renofa Yamaguchi	10,094	10,976	4,312	2,815	5,321	8,967	5,802	4,785												53,072
Roasso Kumamoto	6,457	3,629	3,555	3,485	7,239	2,917	3,519	10,239	4,501											45,541
Ryukyu Okinawa	1,026	11,359	1,767	1,902	1,510	2,228	2,706	2,471	2,175											27,144
SC Sagamihara	7,524	2,460	2,123	1,770	9,862	2,519	1,918	4,545												32,721
Thespa Gunma	5,501	3,247	3,184	3,181	2,950	2,016	5,612	1,941	3,842											31,474
Tochigi SC	8,224	4,973	5,064	5,131	8,017	3,338	3,508	6,275	4,142											48,672
Zweigen Kanazawa	7,358	3,638	4,230	2,961	8,686	3,655	5,418	4,478	2,934											43,358
League total																				762,105

Source: J.League Data

== Awards ==
=== Monthly MVP ===
Month	Player	Pos.	Club	Ref.
August	(Japan) Shota Hino	MF	Ehime FC	
September	(Japan) Sho Sumida	MF	FC Osaka	
October	(Japan) Shota Hino (2)	MF	Ehime FC	

=== Goal of the Month ===
Month	Player	Pos.	Club	Ref.
August	(Japan) Ryoma Sano	FW	Kamatamare Sanuki	
September	(Japan) Ryuhei Yamamoto	DF	Renofa Yamaguchi	
October	(Japan) Shun Nakamura	MF	FC Gifu	

=== Young Player of the Month ===
Month	Player	Pos.	Club	Ref.
August	(Japan) Toshikazu Teruuchi	FW	FC Ryukyu	
September	(Japan) Rikuto Ando	MF	Nara Club	
October	(Japan) Aura Takahashi	FW	Kagoshima United	

=== Save of the Month ===
Month	Player	Club	Ref.
August	(Japan) Ryusei Haruna	FC Gifu	
September	(Spain) Marc Vito	Nara Club	
October	(Japan) Ryusei Haruna	FC Gifu	

=== Manager of the Month ===
Month	Manager	Club	Ref.
August	(Japan) Kiyotaka Ishimaru	FC Gifu	
September	(Japan) Mitsunori Yabuta	FC Osaka	
October	(Japan) Ryotaro Tanaka	Giravanz Kitakyushu	

== Number of teams by prefecture ==
Number	Prefecture	Team(s)
2	Nagano Prefecture	Matsumoto Yamaga and Nagano Parceiro
1	Ehime Prefecture	Ehime
1	Fukuoka Prefecture	Giravanz Kitakyushu
1	Fukushima Prefecture	Fukushima United
1	Gifu Prefecture	FC Gifu
1	Gunma Prefecture	Thespa Gunma
1	Ishikawa Prefecture	Zweigen Kanazawa
1	Kagawa Prefecture	Kamatamare Sanuki
1	Kagoshima Prefecture	Kagoshima United
1	Kanagawa Prefecture	SC Sagamihara
1	Kōchi Prefecture	Kochi United
1	Kumamoto Prefecture	Roasso Kumamoto
1	Nara Prefecture	Nara Club
1	Okinawa Prefecture	Ryukyu Okinawa
1	Osaka Prefecture	FC Osaka
1	Shiga Prefecture	Reilac Shiga
1	Tochigi Prefecture	Tochigi SC
1	Tottori Prefecture	Gainare Tottori
1	Yamaguchi Prefecture	Renofa Yamaguchi

== See also ==
- 2026–27 Emperor's Cup
- 2026–27 J.League Cup
- 2026–27 J1 League
- 2026–27 J2 League
- 2026–27 Japan Football League
- 2026 Japanese Regional Leagues
