= 2025 J3 League =

12th season of J3 League

J3 League
- Season: 2025
- Dates: 15 February – 29 November 2025
- Champions: Tochigi City FC (1st title)
- Promoted: Tochigi City FC; Vanraure Hachinohe; Tegevajaro Miyazaki
- Relegated: Azul Claro Numazu
- Matches: 368
- Goals: 936 (2.54 per match)
- Top goalscorer: Keigo Hashimoto (25 goals)
- Biggest home win: FC Osaka 7-1 Fukushima United FC (22 June 2025)
- Biggest away win: Matsumoto Yamaga FC 0-5 Kochi United SC (5 April 2025); Kochi United SC 0-5 Tochigi City FC (13 April 2025)
- Highest attendance: 15,242; Giravanz Kitakyushu 0–1 Nara Club (16 August 2025)
- Lowest attendance: 374; FC Osaka 4–3 Thespa Gunma (18 April 2025)
- Total attendance: 831,480
- Average attendance: 3,615

The 2025 J3 League, also known as the 2025 Meiji Yasuda J3 League (Japanese: 2025 明治安田J3リーグ, Hepburn: 2025 Meiji Yasuda J3 Rīgu) for sponsorship reasons, was the 12th season of the J3 League, the third-tier Japanese professional league for association football clubs, since its establishment in 2013.

== Overview ==
This was the last J.League season played in a whole calendar year from late winter to early winter, with the following season onwards played from summer to spring.

The league continued with 20 teams for 2025 season since 2023.

The top two teams in the league are automatically promoted to the J2 League, teams ranked 3rd to 6th dispute the promotion play-offs. There is the possibility that as many as two clubs will be relegated to the Japan Football League. Promotion from the JFL is conditional on holding a valid J3 license. If the JFL champions hold a license, the club is automatically promoted and the J3's 20th-placed team is automatically relegated. If the JFL runners-up hold a license, the club needs to play promotion/relegation play-offs against J3's 19th or 20th-placed team for the season, depending on whether the JFL champions hold the J3 license. The club(s) who do not hold a license cannot be promoted and no teams are relegated from the J3 League.

== Schedule ==
The league and match format was announced on 25 November 2024. The league began on 15 February and ended on 29 November in a round-robin format of 38 matches.

The J3 promotion play-offs were held in a similar manner to the J2 playoffs, with the dates confirmed in November.

== Changes from the previous season ==
Tochigi SC, Kagoshima United and Thespa Gunma were relegated to J3 League finishing in 18th, 19th, and 20th places, respectively. Tochigi SC were relegated after eight years in the second division. Kagoshima United returned to the third tier after just one season in J2, while Thespa Gunma dropped back to the J3 following five years in J2.

From J3, the promoted teams were RB Omiya Ardija (formerly known as Omiya Ardija), the team was recently acquired by the Red Bull Group, who were promoted after only one season in J3, runner-up FC Imabari got promotion for the first time ever and played the Ehime derby against Ehime FC in J2 League, and the last team promoted was Kataller Toyama after eleven seasons in J3 thanks to an epic draw in the play-off final against Matsumoto Yamaga with a double from the striker Shosei Usui in the last ten minutes.

Tochigi City got promoted from Japan Football League for the first time ever and played the Tochigi Derby against Tochigi SC. The second team promoted was Kochi United SC, who finished as runner-up and thus qualified for the relegation play-off where they defeated YSCC Yokohama with an aggregate score of 3-1; they are the first team from Kochi Prefecture to play in the J.League.

== Clubs ==
Locations of the 2025 J3 League teams
Greater Tokyo Area J3 League teams

| Teams | Location | Stadium | Capacity | Head coach | Last season | License |
|---|---|---|---|---|---|---|
| Azul Claro Numazu | Numazu, Shizuoka | Ashitaka Park Stadium | 5,104 | (Japan) Hideto Suzuki | 10th | J2 |
| Fukushima United | Fukushima, Fukushima | Toho Stadium | 15,454 | (Japan) Shuhei Terada | 5th | J2 |
| Gainare Tottori | Tottori, Tottori | Axis Bird Stadium | 11,999 | (Japan) Kentaro Hayashi | 13th | J2 |
| FC Gifu | Gifu, Gifu | Gifu Nagaragawa Stadium | 16,310 | (Japan) Kiyotaka Ishimaru | 8th | J1 |
| Giravanz Kitakyushu | Kitakyushu, Fukuoka | Mikuni World Stadium Kitakyushu | 15,300 | (Japan) Kohei Masumoto | 7th | J1 |
| Kagoshima United | Kagoshima, Kagoshima | Shiranami Stadium | 19,934 | (Japan) Naoki Soma | J2 (19th) | J1 |
| Kamatamare Sanuki | Takamatsu, Kagawa | Pikara Stadium | 30,099 | (North Korea) Kim Jong-song | 16th | J1 |
| Kochi United | Kōchi, Kōchi | Kochi Haruno Athletic Stadium | 25,000 | (Japan) Yutaka Akita | JFL (2nd) | J3 |
| Matsumoto Yamaga | Matsumoto, Nagano | Sunpro Alwin | 20,000 | (Japan) Tomonobu Hayakawa | 4th | J1 |
| Nagano Parceiro | Nagano, Nagano | Nagano U Stadium | 15,515 | (Japan) Chikara Fujimoto | 18th | J2 |
| Nara Club | Nara, Nara | Rohto Field Nara | 30,600 | (Japan) Michiharu Otagiri | 17th | J2 |
| FC Osaka | Higashiōsaka, Osaka | Hanazono Rugby Stadium | 27,346 | (Japan) Naoto Otake | 6th | J2 |
| Ryukyu Okinawa | Naha, Okinawa | Tapic Kenso Hiyagon Stadium | 15,500 | (Japan) Tadaaki Hirakawa | 14th | J1 |
| SC Sagamihara | Sagamihara, Kanagawa | Sagamihara Gion Stadium | 6,291 | (Germany) Yuki Richard Stalph | 9th | J2 |
| Tegevajaro Miyazaki | Miyazaki, Miyazaki | Ichigo Miyazaki Shintomi Football Stadium | 5,354 | (Japan) Yuji Okuma | 15th | J2 |
| Thespa Gunma | Maebashi, Gunma | Shoda Shoyu Stadium Gunma | 15,253 | (Japan) Masaru Okita | J2 (20th) | J1 |
| Tochigi City FC | Tochigi, Tochigi | City Football Station | 5,129 | (Japan) Naoki Imaya | JFL (1st) | J2 |
| Tochigi SC | Utsunomiya, Tochigi | Kanseki Stadium Tochigi | 25,244 | (Japan) Shinji Kobayashi | J2 (18th) | J1 |
| Vanraure Hachinohe | Hachinohe, Aomori | Prifoods Stadium | 5,124 | (Japan) Nobuhiro Ishizaki | 7th | J2 |
| Zweigen Kanazawa | Kanazawa, Ishikawa | Kanazawa Go Go Curry Stadium | 10,444 | (Japan) Masateru Tsujita | 12th | J1 |

=== Personnel and kits ===
| Club | Manager | Captain | Kit manufacturer | Main shirt sponsor |
|---|---|---|---|---|
| Azul Claro Numazu | (Japan) Masashi Nakayama | (Japan) Takuya Sugai | (Brazil) Athleta | USUI |
| Fukushima United | (Japan) Shuhei Terada | (Japan) Takeaki Harigaya | (Denmark) Hummel | SportsX |
| Gainare Tottori | (Japan) Kentaro Hayashi | (Japan) Hayato Nukui | (Japan) | |
| FC Gifu | (Japan) Kiyotaka Ishimaru | (Japan) Naoki Yamada | (Japan) Razzoli | Hot Staff |
| Giravanz Kitakyushu | (Japan) Kohei Masumoto | (Japan) Haruki Izawa | (England) Umbro | Yaskawa |
| Kagoshima United | (Japan) Naoki Soma | (Japan) Shuto Inaba | (United States) Under Armour | BHC |
| Kamatamare Sanuki | (North Korea) Kim Jong-song | (Japan) Nao Eguchi | (Denmark) Hummel | Fuji Electric |
| Kochi United SC | (Japan) Yutaka Akita | (Japan) Daichi Kobayashi | (England) Admiral | Yamaha |
| Matsumoto Yamaga | (Japan) Tomonobu Hayakawa | (Japan) Yusuke Kikui | (Japan) Razuso | Epson |
| Nagano Parceiro | (Japan) Chikara Fujimoto | (Japan) Yuya Ono | (Japan) | Hokio |
| Nara Club | (Japan) Michiharu Otagiri | (Japan) Daisei Suzuki | (United States) Squadra | Daiwa House Group |
| FC Osaka | (Japan) Mitsukyo Yabuta | (Japan) Takahiro Kitsui | | Daihatsu Kyushu |
| Ryukyu Okinawa | (Japan) Tadaaki Hirakawa | (Japan) Yuta Sato | (Japan) | |
| SC Sagamihara | (Japan) Yuki Richard Stalph | (Japan) Toshio Shimakawa | (England) Umbro | |
| Tegevajaro Miyazaki | (Japan) Yuji Okuma | (Japan) Keigo Hashimoto | (Japan) Yonex | Ichigo |
| Thespa Gunma | (Japan) Masaru Okita | (Japan) Shusuke Yonehara | (Spain) Kelme | Cainz |
| Tochigi City | (Japan) Naoki Imaya | (Japan) Rempei Uchida | (Japan) Luxperior | Otsuka Pharmaceutical (Pocari Sweat) |
| Tochigi SC | (Japan) Shinji Kobayashi | (Japan) Sho Sato | (Brazil) Athleta | TKC |
| Vanraure Hachinohe | (Japan) Nobuhiro Ishizaki | (Japan) Shogo Onishi | (Denmark) Hummel | Atmix |
| Zweigen Kanazawa | (Japan) Maki Tsujita | (Japan) Hiroto Hatao | (Denmark) Hummel | Twelve |

=== Managerial changes ===
| Team | Outgoing manager | Manner of departure | Date of vacancy | Position in the table | Incoming manager | Date of appointment | Ref. |
|---|---|---|---|---|---|---|---|
| Zweigen Kanazawa | (Japan) Akira Ito | Appointed as general manager | 1 June 2025 | 11th | (Japan) Masateru Tsujita | 3 June 2025 | |
| Nara Club | (Japan) Ichizo Nakata | Sacked | 12 June 2025 | 8th | (Japan) Michiharu Otagiri | 12 June 2025 | |
| FC Gifu | (Japan) Yasuaki Oshima | Sacked | 2 July 2025 | 18th | (Japan) Koji Ohashi | 2 July 2025 | |
| FC Gifu | (Japan) Koji Ohashi | Replaced by permanent manager | 2 July 2025 | 18th | (Japan) Kiyotaka Ishimaru | 7 July 2025 | |
| Kamatamare Sanuki | (Japan) Atsushi Yoneyama | Sacked | 6 July 2025 | 20th | (North Korea) Kim Jong-song | 8 July 2025 | |
| FC Osaka | (Japan) Naoto Otake | Sacked | 31 August 2025 | 4th | (Japan) Mitsukyo Yabuta (Interim) | 31 August 2025 | |
| Azul Claro Numazu | (Japan) Masashi Nakayama | Sacked | 14 September 2025 | 20th | (Japan) Hideto Suzuki | 14 September 2025 | |
| Kochi United SC | (Japan) Yutaka Akita | Sacked | 23 September 2025 | 16th | (Japan) Takahisa Shiraishi | 23 September 2025 | |

=== Foreign players ===
From the 2021 season onwards, there are no limitations on signing foreign players, but clubs could only register up to five of them for a single matchday squad. Players from J.League partner nations (Thailand, Vietnam, Myanmar, Malaysia, Cambodia, Singapore, Indonesia, and Qatar) were exempted from these restrictions.

- Players name in **bold** indicates the player is registered during the summer transfer window.
- Player's name in italics indicates the player has Japanese nationality in addition to their FIFA nationality, holds the nationality of a J.League partner nation, or is exempt from being treated as a foreign player due to having been born in Japan and being enrolled in, or having graduated from an approved type of school in the country.

| Club | Player 1 | Player 2 | Player 3 | Player 4 | Player 5 | Player 6 | Former players |
|---|---|---|---|---|---|---|---|
| Azul Claro Numazu | (Brazil) Gustavo Rissi | (Brazil) Lucas Sena | (Brazil) Weverton | (Germany) Guirone Gueguim | (Ghana) Wadi Ibrahim Suzuki | (Spain) **Enric Martínez** | |
| Fukushima United | | | | | | | |
| Gainare Tottori | (China) Jin Shiming | (United States) Kojo Dadzie | | | | | |
| FC Gifu | (Brazil) Dudu | (North Korea) Mun In-ju | (South Korea) Kim Yoo-geon | (Spain) Jon Ander Serantes | | | |
| Giravanz Kitakyushu | (South Korea) Koh Seung-jin | | | | | | |
| Kagoshima United | (Brazil) Gaudencio | (Brazil) Renan | (Brazil) Rodrigo Angelotti | | | | |
| Kamatamare Sanuki | (Brazil) Eduardo | (Kenya) Ismael Dunga | | | | | |
| Kochi United | (South Korea) Kang Sung-chan | (South Korea) **Park Se-gi** | (South Korea) **Park Yong-ie** | (Spain) **Arnau Riera** | | | |
| Matsumoto Yamaga | (Brazil) Lucas Vargas | (Brazil) Tiago | (South Korea) Kim Jun-hyun | | | | |
| Nagano Parceiro | (Brazil) Thales Paula | (South Korea) Lee Seung-won | (South Korea) Lim Ji-hoon | | | | |
| Nara Club | (South Korea) Yu Ye-chan | | | | | | (Spain) Marc Vito (Thailand) Chanapach Buaphan (Thailand) Thawatchai Inprakhon |
| FC Osaka | (Brazil) Vinícius | (South Korea) Kim Yoon-sik | (South Korea) Shin Dong-min | (South Korea) Woo Sang-ho | (Togo) **Yves Avelete** | | (South Korea) Ha Ji-sung (South Korea) Lee Dong-yeol |
| Ryukyu Okinawa | | | | | | | (South Korea) Jo Eun-soo |
| SC Sagamihara | (Brazil) Rafael Furtado | (Dominican Republic) Noam Baumann | (Poland) Kevin Pytlik | | | | (France) Robin Maulun (Nigeria) Origbaajo Ismaila |
| Tegevajaro Miyazaki | (South Korea) Kim Geon-yeon | (South Korea) Lee Chung-won | | | | | |
| Thespa Gunma | (South Korea) Kim Je-hee | | | | | | |
| Tochigi City FC | (Australia) Joe Caletti | (Brazil) Carlos Eduardo | (Croatia) Matej Jonjić | (Nigeria) Peter Utaka | (Nigeria) Taofiq Jibril | | |
| Tochigi SC | (South Korea) Kim Min-jun | (Nigeria) Kenneth Otabor | | | | | (Brazil) Rafael Costa |
| Vanraure Hachinohe | | | | | | | |
| Zweigen Kanazawa | (Brazil) Jeferson Jari | (Brazil) Patric | | | | | |

== League table ==
| Pos | Team | Pld | W | D | L | GF | GA | GD | Pts | Promotion or relegation |
|---|---|---|---|---|---|---|---|---|---|---|
| 1 | Tochigi City FC (C, P) | 38 | 23 | 8 | 7 | 69 | 37 | +32 | 77 | Promotion to the J2 League |
| 2 | Vanraure Hachinohe (P) | 38 | 21 | 9 | 8 | 46 | 23 | +23 | 72 | Promotion to the J2 League |
| 3 | FC Osaka | 38 | 21 | 8 | 9 | 55 | 33 | +22 | 71 | Qualification for the promotion play-offs |
| 4 | Tegevajaro Miyazaki (O, P) | 38 | 19 | 10 | 9 | 61 | 45 | +16 | 67 | Qualification for the promotion play-offs |
| 5 | Kagoshima United | 38 | 18 | 12 | 8 | 69 | 44 | +25 | 66 | Qualification for the promotion play-offs |
| 6 | Zweigen Kanazawa | 38 | 18 | 5 | 15 | 53 | 45 | +8 | 59 | Qualification for the promotion play-offs |
| 7 | Tochigi SC | 38 | 17 | 7 | 14 | 42 | 36 | +6 | 58 | |
| 8 | Giravanz Kitakyushu | 38 | 17 | 5 | 16 | 46 | 41 | +5 | 56 | |
| 9 | Nara Club | 38 | 15 | 11 | 12 | 50 | 46 | +4 | 56 | |
| 10 | Fukushima United | 38 | 16 | 8 | 14 | 60 | 67 | −7 | 56 | |
| 11 | Gainare Tottori | 38 | 15 | 6 | 17 | 44 | 49 | −5 | 51 | |
| 12 | SC Sagamihara | 38 | 13 | 11 | 14 | 38 | 50 | −12 | 50 | |
| 13 | FC Gifu | 38 | 13 | 8 | 17 | 52 | 60 | −8 | 47 | |
| 14 | Thespa Gunma | 38 | 12 | 10 | 16 | 56 | 59 | −3 | 46 | |
| 15 | Matsumoto Yamaga | 38 | 11 | 10 | 17 | 41 | 50 | −9 | 43 | |
| 16 | Ryukyu Okinawa | 38 | 10 | 10 | 18 | 41 | 57 | −16 | 40 | |
| 17 | Kamatamare Sanuki | 38 | 10 | 8 | 20 | 41 | 57 | −16 | 38 | |
| 18 | Kochi United | 38 | 10 | 8 | 20 | 40 | 60 | −20 | 38 | |
| 19 | Nagano Parceiro | 38 | 9 | 8 | 21 | 29 | 57 | −28 | 35 | |
| 20 | Azul Claro Numazu (R) | 38 | 6 | 10 | 22 | 40 | 57 | −17 | 28 | Qualification for the relegation/promotion play-offs |

Source: Meiji Yasuda J3 League, J.League Data Site
Rules for classification: 1) Points; 2) Goal difference; 3) Goals scored; 4) Head-to-head points; 5) Head-to-head goal difference; 6) Head-to-head goal scored; 7) Fair-play points.
(C) Champions; (O) Play-off winners; (P) Promoted; (R) Relegated

== Play-offs ==
=== Promotion play-offs ===
The usual format was applied in the 2025 season. Promotion play-offs, officially called the Meiji Yasuda Road To J2 Play-offs 2025 (Note: On the official J.League English website, it is listed as J2 Promotion Play-Offs) (Japanese: 明治安田J2昇格プレーオフ2025), was held from the semi-finals, where the match-ups were previously semi-determined. Based on the J3 placements at the end of the regular season, the third-placed team played against the sixth-placed, while the fourth-placed team played against the fifth-placed. The winners of the semi-finals played the final, with the winners promoted to the J2.

If a match was tied in the play-offs, the team with the highest league position are declared the winner. The rank order was: J3's third, fourth, fifth, and sixth-placed teams.

Semi-finals
3 | FC Osaka | 1
6 | Zweigen Kanazawa | 0
4 | Tegevajaro Miyazaki | 2
5 | Kagoshima United | 0

Final
3 | FC Osaka | 0
4 | Tegevajaro Miyazaki | 4

=== Semi-finals ===
7 December 2025
15:03 JST

| FC Osaka | 1–0 | Zweigen Kanazawa |
|---|---|---|
| T. Shimada 80' | Report |

Axis Bird Stadium, Tottori, Tottori
Attendance: 2,127
Referee: Yosuke Kubota

7 December 2025
15:03 JST

| Tegevajaro Miyazaki | 2–0 | Kagoshima United |
|---|---|---|
| R. Inoue 45+2'; Y. Matsumoto 63' | Report |

Ichigo Miyazaki Shintomi Football Stadium, Miyazaki
Attendance: 4,389
Referee: Toshihiro Nakai

=== Final ===
14 December 2025
15:00 JST

| FC Osaka | 0–4 | Tegevajaro Miyazaki |
|---|---|---|
| | Report | (o.g.) Riku Hashimoto; 42' Shu Yoshizawa; 63' Hayate Take; 70' Mahiro Ano |

Hanazono Rugby Stadium, Higashiosaka
Attendance: 1 487
Referee: Yuzo Sutani

=== Relegation play-offs ===
The relegation play-offs, officially called the 2025 J3/JFL Play-Offs (Japanese: 2025 J3・JFL入れ替え戦 (Note: The logo and signage reads 2025 J.League J3・JFL入れ替え戦)), took place on 7 and 14 December 2025. If two teams were level, the match went to extra time and a penalty shoot-out. The away goals rule does not count. Since the champions of the 2025 Japan Football League, Honda FC, did not hold a J3 professional license, they were ineligible for promotion. As a result, the bottom placed team faced the runners-up in the relegation play-off, while the 19th-place team avoided it.

=== Overview ===
| Team 1 | Agg. | Team 2 | 1st leg | 2nd leg |
|---|---|---|---|---|
| Azul Claro Numazu (J3) | 3–4 | Reilac Shiga (JFL) | 2–3 | 1–1 |

=== Matches ===
7 December 2025
TBA JST

| Reilac Shiga | 3–2 | Azul Claro Numazu |
|---|---|---|
| T. Nishiyama 3'; F. Romero 23'; K. Miyake 81' | Report | K. Shirawachi 13'; K. Kawamata 74' |

Heiwado HATO Stadium, Shiga
14 December 2025
TBA JST

| Azul Claro Numazu | 1–1 | Reilac Shiga |
|---|---|---|
| Keita Shirawachi 23'; Kaiyo Yanagimachi (red card) 83'; Guirone Gueguim (red card) 90+4' | Report | 22' Shun Akiyama |

Ashitaka Stadium, Numazu
Attendance: 8 255
Referee: Tetsuro Yoshida

== Season statistics ==
As of 26 July 2025

=== Top scorers ===
| Rank | Player | Club | Goals |
|---|---|---|---|
| 1 | (Japan) Keigo Hashimoto | Tegevajaro Miyazaki | 25 |
| 2 | (Japan) Ryuji Sawakami | Vanraure Hachinohe | 12 |
| 2 | (Japan) Yusei Toshida | Zweigen Kanazawa | 12 |
| 2 | (Japan) Takumi Shimada | FC Osaka | 12 |
| 2 | (Japan) Yuta Togashi | Gainare Tottori | 12 |
| 6 | (Japan) Paulo Junichi Tanaka | Tochigi City | 11 |
| 6 | (Brazil) Patric | Zweigen Kanazawa | 11 |
| 6 | (Japan) Yuki Okada | Nara Club | 11 |
| 9 | (Japan) Hiroki Higuchi | Fukushima United | 10 |
| 9 | (Japan) Kota Mori | Fukushima United | 10 |
| 9 | (Japan) Ryunosuke Ota | Tochigi SC | 10 |
| 9 | (Japan) Kokoro Kobayashi | Kōchi United SC | 10 |
| 9 | (Japan) Keito Kawamura | Kagoshima United | 10 |

== Awards ==
=== Monthly awards ===
| Month | Manager of the Month | | Monthly MVP | | Goal of the Month | | Young Player of the Month | | Save of the Month | | References |
| Month | Manager | Club | Player | Club | Player | Club | Player | Club | Player | Club | References |
|---|---|---|---|---|---|---|---|---|---|---|---|
| February/March | Naoto Otake | FC Osaka | Paulo Junichi Tanaka | Tochigi City | Yoshihito Kondo | Kagoshima United | Yuto Kunitake | Nara Club | Toi Yamamoto | FC Osaka | |
| April | Naoki Imaya | Tochigi City | Kokoro Kobayashi | Kochi United SC | Daisuke Inazumi | Vanraure Hachinohe | Sora Tanaka | Matsumoto Yamaga | Takumi Yamanoi | Zweigen Kanazawa | |
| May | Yuji Okuma | Tegevajaro Miyazaki | Takumi Shimada | FC Osaka | Toi Kagami | Thespa Gunma | Sora Tanaka | Matsumoto Yamaga | Hisaya Sato | FC Ryukyu | |
| June | Nobuhiro Ishizaki | Vanraure Hachinohe | Genki Egawa | Tegevajaro Miyazaki | Keito Kawamura | Kagoshima United | Sora Tanaka | Roasso Kumamoto | Kaito Konomi | Giravanz Kitakyushu | |

== See also ==
- 2025 Japanese Super Cup
- 2025 Emperor's Cup
- 2025 J1 League
- 2025 J2 League
- 2025 J.League Cup
- 2025 Japan Football League
