= Shoki Nagano =

Japanese footballer

Personal information
- Full name: Shoki Nagano
- Date of birth: 22 May 2002 (age 24)
- Place of birth: Kitakyushu, Fukuoka, Japan
- Height: 1.83 m (6 ft 0 in)
- Position: Attacking midfielder

Team information
- Current team: FC Osaka

Youth career
- Higashiya Red Star
- Kokuraminami FC
- 2018–2020: Higashi Fukuoka HS

Senior career*
Years	Team	Apps	(Gls)
2021–2025	Fukushima United	86	(11)
2025–2026	GKS Wikielec	27	(5)
2026–	FC Osaka	0	(0)
- * Club domestic league appearances and goals as of 22:05, 3 June 2026 (UTC)

Shoki Nagano (長野 星輝, Nagano Shoki; born 22 May 2002) is a Japanese professional footballer who plays as an attacking midfielder for J3 League club FC Osaka.

== Early life ==
Shoki Nagano was born in Kitakyushu. He played for Higashiya Red Star, Kokuraminai FC and Higashi Fukuoka HS in his youth.

== Career ==
Nagano made his league debut for Fukushima United against Iwate Grulla Morioka on 26 May 2021. Nagano scored his first goal for the club against YSCC on 28 November 2021, scoring in the 29th minute.

In July 2025, Nagano signed a one-year contract with GKS Wikielec in the Polish fourth tier. On 11 February 2026, he left GKS citing personal reasons, before rejoining the club later that month.

On 26 June 2026, Nagano moved back to Japan to join J3 League side FC Osaka.

== Career statistics ==
As of match played 30 May 2026

Appearances and goals by club, season and competition
Club	Season	League			National cup (Note: Includes Emperor's Cup, Polish Cup)		League cup		Other		Total	
Club	Season	Division	Apps	Goals	Apps	Goals	Apps	Goals	Apps	Goals	Apps	Goals
Fukushima United	2021	J3 League	10	2	0	0	—		0	0	10	2
Fukushima United	2022	J3 League	31	5	1	0	—		0	0	32	5
Fukushima United	2023	J3 League	36	3	1	0	—		0	0	37	3
Fukushima United	2024	J3 League	9	1	0	0	—		0	0	9	1
Fukushima United	Total		86	11	2	0	—		0	0	88	11
GKS Wikielec	2025–26	III liga, group I	27	5	1	0	—		—		28	5
FC Osaka	2026–27	J3 League	0	0	0	0	—		—		0	0
Career total			113	16	3	0	0	0	0	0	116	16
