= Keigo Hashimoto =

Japanese footballer

Keigo Hashimoto 橋本 啓吾
Personal information
- Date of birth: 17 September 1998 (age 28)
- Place of birth: Osaka, Japan
- Height: 1.88 m (6 ft 2 in)
- Position: Forward

Team information
- Current team: Tegevajaro Miyazaki
- Number: 9

Youth career
- FC Girasol
- Vitoria Matsubara FC
- 2014–2016: Hannan University High School

College career
Years	Team	Apps	(Gls)
2017–2020	Osaka University of Commerce		

Senior career*
Years	Team	Apps	(Gls)
2021–	Tegevajaro Miyazaki	146	(49)
- * Club domestic league appearances and goals as of 16 August 2026

Keigo Hashimoto (橋本 啓吾, Hashimoto Keigo; born 17 September 1998) is a Japanese footballer currently playing as a forward for J2 League club, Tegevajaro Miyazaki.

== Career ==
Hashimoto won the J3 League Monthly MVP award for October 2025 after scoring 6 goals in 3 matches.. Hashimoto secure top score of J3 League with 25 goals in 2025 season. On 14 December 2025, Hashimoto was brought his club promotion to J2 League for the first time in their history from next season after defeat FC Osaka 4–0 in Axis Bird Stadium on Promotion play-off final.

== Career statistics ==
=== Club ===
As of the start from 2026–27 season.

Appearances and goals by club, season and competition
Club	Season	League			National Cup		League Cup		Total	
Club	Season	Division	Apps	Goals	Apps	Goals	Apps	Goals	Apps	Goals
Japan			League		Emperor's Cup		J.League Cup		Total	
Tegevajaro Miyazaki	2021	J3 League	28	6	0	0	–		28	6
Tegevajaro Miyazaki	2022	J3 League	26	5	0	0	–		26	5
Tegevajaro Miyazaki	2023	J3 League	20	1	2	0	–		22	1
Tegevajaro Miyazaki	2024	J3 League	36	12	2	2	1	0	39	14
Tegevajaro Miyazaki	2025	J3 League	34	25	0	0	0	0	34	25
Tegevajaro Miyazaki	2026	J2 League	0	0	–				0	0
Tegevajaro Miyazaki	2026–27	J2 League	0	0	0	0	0	0	0	0
Career total			144	49	4	2	1	0	149	51

== Honours ==
Tegevajaro Miyazaki

- J3 League Promotion play-off winner: 2025

Individual

- J3 League Top scorer: 2025
