= Norimichi =

- Gender: Male

Origin
- Origin: Japanese
- Meaning: Different meanings depending on the kanji used

Norimichi (written: 義道 or 教通) is a masculine Japanese given name. Notable people with the name include:

- Fujiwara no Norimichi (藤原 教通; 996–1075), Japanese kugyō
- Norimichi Yamamoto (山本 義道; born 1995), Japanese footballer
