= Kevin Pytlik =

Footballer (born 1997)

Personal information
- Date of birth: 14 November 1997 (age 28)
- Place of birth: Wuppertal, Germany
- Height: 1.84 m (6 ft 0 in)
- Position: Defender

Team information
- Current team: SC Sagamihara
- Number: 3

Youth career
- –2007: Sportfreunde Siegen
- 2007–2010: 1. FC Wülfrath
- 2010–2011: Wuppertaler SV
- 2011–2012: TSC Eintracht Dortmund
- 2012–2013: Rot-Weiss Essen
- 2013–2016: VfL Bochum

Senior career*
Years	Team	Apps	(Gls)
2016–2018	Wuppertaler SV	35	(1)
2018–2019	Sportfreunde Lotte	0	(0)
2019–2024	Wuppertaler SV	111	(3)
2024	Viktoria Köln	11	(0)
2025–	SC Sagamihara	31	(0)

International career
2014	Poland U18	2	(1)
- * Club domestic league appearances and goals as of 10:12, 7 June 2026 (UTC)

Kevin Pytlik (born 14 November 1997) is a professional footballer who plays as a defender for J3 League club SC Sagamihara. Born in Germany, he was a Poland youth international.

== Club career ==
As a youth player, Pytlik joined the youth academy of Sportfreunde Siegen. In 2007, he joined the youth academy of 1. FC Wülfrath. Three years later, he joined the youth academy of Wuppertaler SV, before joining the youth academy of TSC Eintracht Dortmund in 2011. One year later, he joined the youth academy of Rot-Weiss Essen. Subsequently, he joined the youth academy of VfL Bochum in 2013.

Pytlik started his senior career with Wuppertaler SV in 2016. Two years later, he signed for Sportfreunde Lotte. Following his stint there, he returned to Wuppertaler SV in 2019, where he captained the club and helped them win the 2021 Lower Rhine Cup. During the summer of 2024, he signed for Viktoria Köln. German news website Wuppertal total wrote that he "was denied a regular place... [and] often had to start from the bench" while playing for the club. Ahead of the 2025 season, he signed for Japanese side SC Sagamihara, playing in the J3 League.

== Style of play ==
Pytlik plays a defender and is two-footed. German newspaper Westdeutsche Zeitung wrote in 2019 that he is a "strong runner and combative defender".
