= List of association football rivalries in Japan =

This is a list of the main association football rivalries in Japan.

== List ==
	Derby	Rivals
Special	"Eternal derby" (between the clubs that have never been relegated in the J.League)	Kashima Antlers vs. Yokohama F. Marinos
National	"National Derby" (between the most successful football clubs in this country)	Tokyo Verdy vs Yokohama F. Marinos; Urawa Reds vs Gamba Osaka; Kashima Antlers vs Jubilo Iwata
City	Saitama derby	Urawa Red Diamonds vs. RB Omiya Ardija
City	Yokohama derby	Yokohama F. Marinos vs. Yokohama FC
Prefectural	Fukushima derby	Fukushima United FC vs. Iwaki FC
Prefectural	Ibaraki derby	Kashima Antlers vs. Mito HollyHock
Prefectural	Tochigi derby	Tochigi SC vs. Tochigi City FC
Prefectural	Chiba derby	JEF United Chiba vs. Kashiwa Reysol
Prefectural	Tokyo derby	FC Tokyo vs. Tokyo Verdy
Prefectural	Tokyo Classic	Tokyo Verdy vs. FC Machida Zelvia
Prefectural	Kanagawa derby	Kawasaki Frontale vs. Yokohama F. Marinos vs. Yokohama FC vs. Shonan Bellmare
Prefectural	Shinshu derby	Matsumoto Yamaga FC vs. AC Nagano Parceiro
Prefectural	Shizuoka derby	Shimizu S-Pulse vs. Júbilo Iwata
Prefectural	Osaka derby	Gamba Osaka vs. Cerezo Osaka vs. FC Osaka
Prefectural	Iyo Kessen	Ehime FC vs. FC Imabari
Prefectural	Fukuoka derby	Avispa Fukuoka vs. Giravanz Kitakyushu
Tōhoku	Tōhoku derby	Vanraure Hachinohe vs. Iwate Grulla Morioka vs. Blaublitz Akita vs. Vegalta Sendai vs. Montedio Yamagata vs. Fukushima United FC vs. Iwaki FC
Tōhoku	Nambu derby	Vanraure Hachinohe vs. Iwate Grulla Morioka
Tōhoku	Michinoku derby	Vegalta Sendai vs. Montedio Yamagata
Tōhoku	Ōshū Gassen	Iwate Grulla Morioka vs. Blaublitz Akita vs. Montedio Yamagata
Tōhoku	North Tōhoku derby	Vanraure Hachinohe vs. Iwate Grulla Morioka vs. Blaublitz Akita
Tōhoku	Ōu Honsen	Blaublitz Akita vs. Montedio Yamagata
Kantō	North Kantō derby	Mito HollyHock vs. Tochigi SC vs. Tochigi City FC vs. Thespa Gunma
Kantō	Tamagawa Clásico	FC Tokyo vs. Kawasaki Frontale
Kantō	Busō Kessen	FC Machida Zelvia vs. SC Sagamihara
Chūbu	Kōshin derby	Ventforet Kofu vs. Matsumoto Yamaga FC
Chūbu	Shinetsu derby	Matsumoto Yamaga FC vs. AC Nagano Parceiro vs. Albirex Niigata
Chūbu	Hokuriku derby	Kataller Toyama vs. Zweigen Kanazawa
Chūbu	Tōkai derby	Shimizu S-Pulse vs. Júbilo Iwata vs. Nagoya Grampus
Chūbu	Aichi derby	Nagoya Grampus vs. FC Gifu
Kinki	Kansai derby	Kyoto Sanga FC vs. Gamba Osaka vs. Cerezo Osaka vs. Vissel Kobe
Kinki	Mount Ikoma derby	FC Osaka vs. Nara Club
Chūgoku	Inyō derby	Gainare Tottori vs. Fagiano Okayama
Chūgoku	Chūgoku derby	Fagiano Okayama vs. Sanfrecce Hiroshima
Shikoku	Shikoku derby	Ehime FC vs. FC Imabari vs. Tokushima Vortis vs. Kochi United SC
Shikoku	North Shikoku Clásico	Kamatamare Sanuki vs. Ehime FC vs. FC Imabari
Shikoku	East Shikoku Clásico	Kamatamare Sanuki vs. Tokushima Vortis
Shikoku	Dosan Sen	Kamatamare Sanuki vs. Kochi United SC
Kyūshū	Kyūshū derby	Avispa Fukuoka vs. Giravanz Kitakyushu vs. Sagan Tosu vs. V-Varen Nagasaki vs. Roasso Kumamoto vs. Oita Trinita vs. Tegevajaro Miyazaki vs. Kagoshima United FC vs. FC Ryukyu

== See also ==
- List of association football club rivalries in Asia and Oceania
- List of association football rivalries
- List of sports rivalries
