= Takumi Shimada =

Japanese footballer

Takumi Shimada 島田 拓海
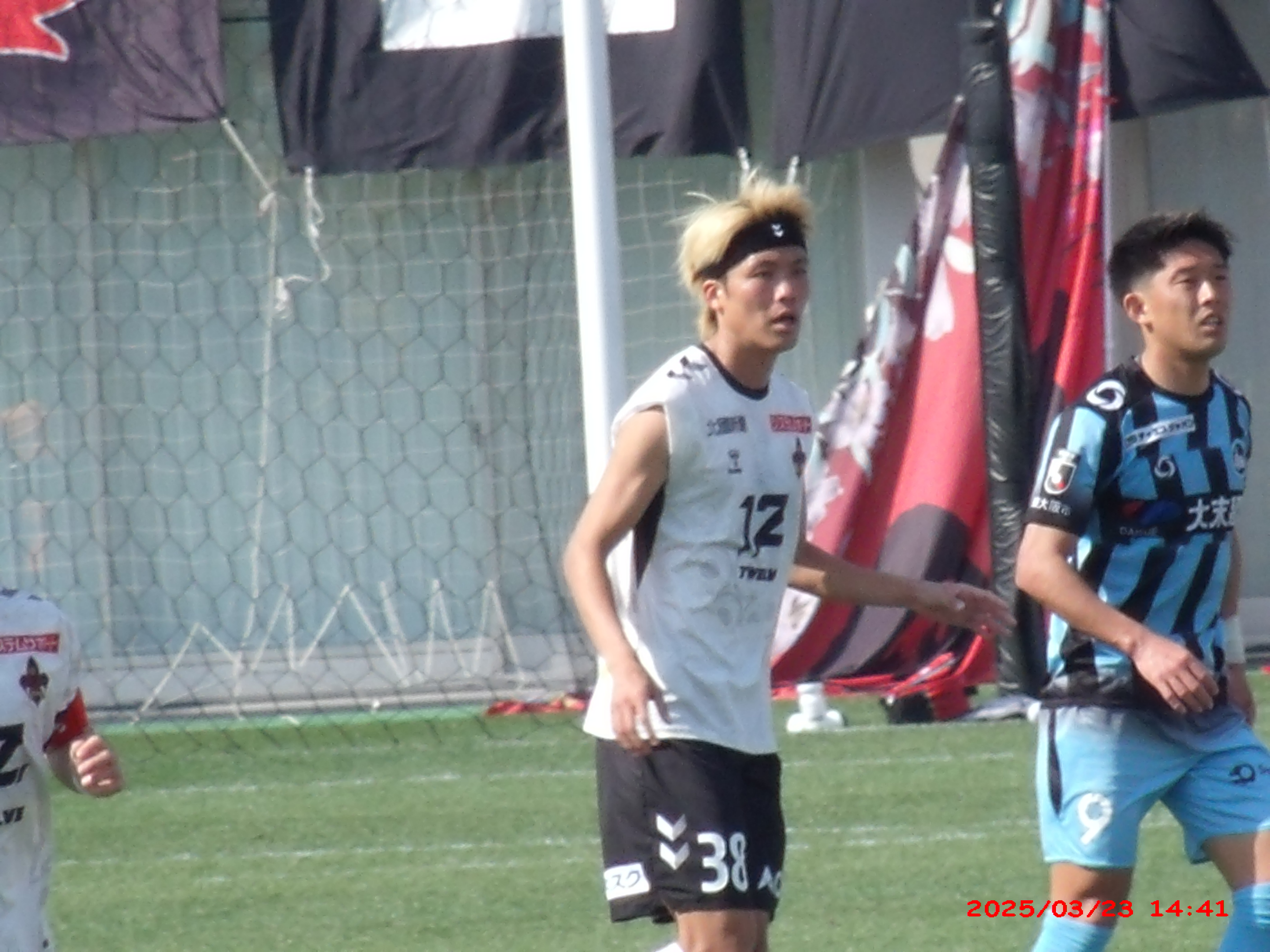
- From left Norimichi Yamamoto on right Takumi Shimada

Personal information
- Date of birth: 25 August 1996 (age 30)
- Place of birth: Nara, Japan
- Height: 1.75 m (5 ft 9 in)
- Position: Forward

Team information
- Current team: FC Osaka
- Number: 9

Youth career
- 2012–2014: Nara Ikuei High School

College career
| Years | Team | Apps | (Gls) |
| 2015–2018 | Osaka University of Economics | | |

Senior career*
| Years | Team | Apps | (Gls) |
| 2019–2020 | Nara Club | 39 | (8) |
| 2021–2022 | Vanraure Hachinohe | 47 | (6) |
| 2023– | FC Osaka | 129 | (26) |
- * Club domestic league appearances and goals as of 18 August 2026

Takumi Shimada (島田 拓海, Shimada Takumi; born 25 August 1996) is a Japanese footballer currently playing as a forward for FC Osaka.

== Career ==
Shimada begin first youth career with Nara Ikuei High School in 2012 until he graduated from school in 2014. When, he entered to college in Osaka University of Economics in 2015 until he was graduation in 2018.

After graduation from university. On 22 December 2018, Shimada begin first professional career with Hometown club, Nara Club from 2019. In the 2020 season, he played in all 15 league games and scored 5 goals. He was the team's top scorer, ranking seventh in scoring.

On 18 December 2020, Shimada joined to J3 club, Vanraure Hachinohe from 2021 season. On 30 December 2022, he terminated his contract with his club and left for the Vanraure Hachinohe after two years in Hachinohe.

On 11 January 2023, Shimada announcement officially transfer to J3 newly promoted club, FC Osaka for upcoming 2023 season.

== Career statistics ==
=== Club ===
As of the start from 2024 season.

| Club | Season | League | | | National Cup | | League Cup | | Other | | Total | |
| Club | Season | Division | Apps | Goals | Apps | Goals | Apps | Goals | Apps | Goals | Apps | Goals |
|---|---|---|---|---|---|---|---|---|---|---|---|---|
| Nara Club | 2019 | JFL | 24 | 3 | 1 (Note: Appearances in the Emperor's Cup) | 1 | – | | 0 | 0 | 25 | 4 |
| Nara Club | 2020 | JFL | 15 | 5 | 2 | 0 | – | | 0 | 0 | 17 | 5 |
| Nara Club | Total | | 39 | 8 | 3 | 1 | 0 | 0 | 0 | 0 | 42 | 9 |
| Vanraure Hachinohe | 2021 | J3 League | 19 | 5 | 3 | 3 | – | | 0 | 0 | 22 | 8 |
| Vanraure Hachinohe | 2022 | J3 League | 28 | 1 | 1 | 0 | – | | 0 | 0 | 29 | 1 |
| Vanraure Hachinohe | Total | | 47 | 6 | 4 | 3 | 0 | 0 | 0 | 0 | 51 | 9 |
| FC Osaka | 2023 | J3 League | 37 | 6 | 0 | 0 | 0 | 0 | 0 | 0 | 37 | 6 |
| FC Osaka | 2024 | J3 League | 0 | 0 | 0 | 0 | 0 | 0 | 0 | 0 | 0 | 0 |
| FC Osaka | Total | | 37 | 6 | 0 | 0 | 0 | 0 | 0 | 0 | 37 | 6 |
| Career total | | | 124 | 20 | 7 | 4 | 0 | 0 | 0 | 0 | 124 | 24 |
