= Mun In-ju =

North Korean association football player (born 1999)

Mun In-ju 文仁柱 문인주
Personal information
- Date of birth: 22 August 1999 (age 27)
- Place of birth: Saitama Prefecture, Japan
- Height: 1.67 m (5 ft 6 in)
- Position: Midfielder

Team information
- Current team: FC Gifu
- Number: 22

Youth career
- 2005–2011: Tokyo Korean Elementary School
- 2012–2014: Tokyo Korean Junior High School
- 2015–2017: Tokyo Korean High School

College career
Years	Team	Apps	(Gls)
2018–2021	Korea University		

Senior career*
Years	Team	Apps	(Gls)
2022–2023	Gainare Tottori	49	(2)
2024–	FC Gifu	83	(7)

International career^{‡}
2020	North Korea U23		
2024–	North Korea	1	(0)
- * Club domestic league appearances and goals as of 17 August 2026 ‡ National team caps and goals as of 21 March 2024

Mun In-ju (文仁柱, Inju Mun; Korean: 문인주; born 22 August 1999) is a professional footballer who plays as a midfielder for J3 League club FC Gifu. Born in Japan, he plays for the North Korea national team.

== Club career ==
Mun started his career with Japanese third-tier side Gainare Tottori. On 19 June 2022, he debuted for Gainare Tottori during a 2–0 win over Tegevajaro Miyazaki. On 23 October 2022, Mun scored his first goal for Gainare Tottori during a 3–2 win over Giravanz Kitakyushu.

On 22 December 2023, Mun officially transferred to FC Gifu for the 2024 season in an announcement made by the club.

== International career ==
In January 2024, he was called up to the North Korea national team for the first time for a training camp. He was also selected for the squad for the two matches against Japan—an away fixture on 21 March and a home fixture on 26 March—as part of the second round of the 2026 FIFA World Cup qualification. He made his debut for the North Korean national team when he came on as a substitute in the second half of the away match against Japan, held at the National Stadium on 21 March. However, the home match scheduled for 26 January at the Kim Il-sung Stadium was cancelled at the request of the North Korean side. The match was subsequently declared a forfeit, with the North Korean national team recorded as having lost 0–3.

== Career statistics ==
=== Club ===
Updated to the end of 2023 season.

Club performance			League		Cup		League Cup		Total	
Season	Club	League	Apps	Goals	Apps	Goals	Apps	Goals	Apps	Goals
Japan			League		Emperor's Cup		J. League Cup		Total	
2022	Gainare Tottori	J3 League	15	1	1	0	–		16	1
2023	Gainare Tottori	J3 League	34	1	1	0	–		35	1
2024	FC Gifu	J3 League	0	0	0	0	0	0	0	0
Career total			49	2	2	0	0	0	51	2
