= Yuki Richard Stalph =

German Japanese football and coach

Personal information
- Full name: Yuki Richard Stalph
- Date of birth: 4 August 1984 (age 42)
- Place of birth: Bochum, West Germany
- Position: Midfielder

Team information
- Current team: SC Sagamihara (manager)

Youth career
- 2001: Wuppertaler SV U17
- 2001: YSCC Yokohama
- 2001: FC Zurich U21
- 2004: SC Wassenach

Senior career*
Years	Team	Apps	(Gls)
2004–2006	SG Brohltal Burgbrohl		
2007–2008	Balestier Khalsa FC		
2008–2009	Harrisburg City Islanders		
2009–2010	SC Idar-Oberstein	3	(0)
2010–2011	Hekari United FC		
2011	JEF Reserves	0	(0)
2012–2014	SC Idar-Oberstein		

Managerial career
- 2019–2021: YSCC Yokohama
- 2022–2023: AC Nagano Parceiro
- 2023–2024: Thailand U20
- 2024–: SC Sagamihara
- * Club domestic league appearances and goals

Yuki Richard Stalph (Japanese: シュタルフ悠紀リヒャルト, romanized: Shutarufu Yūki Rihyaruto; born 4 August 1984) is a German-Japanese professional football manager and former player who is the current manager of J3 League club SC Sagamihara.

== Early life ==
Stalph was born in Bochum, Germany to a Japanese mother and German father. Two years later, in March 1987, the family moved to Japan.

After graduating from high school in May 2003, Stalph moved to Zürich, Switzerland to kick-off his football career.

== Playing career ==
Stalph previously played for Hekari United FC and before that he started for the SC Idar-Oberstein and Harrisburg City Islanders.

== Managerial career ==
In June 2024, it was announced that Stalph would become the new manager of J3 League club SC Sagamihara, following this dismissal of Kazuyuki Toda.

== Managerial statistics ==
As of match played 28 June 2025

Team	From	To	Record				
Team	From	To	G	W	D	L	Win %
YSCC Yokohama	1 February 2019	31 January 2022	95	29	21	45	30.53
AC Nagano Parceiro	1 February 2022	27 August 2023	60	23	15	22	38.33
Thailand U20	1 December 2023	3 June 2024	2	1	1	0	50.00
SC Sagamihara	26 June 2024	Present	41	13	12	16	31.71
Total			198	66	49	83	33.33
