= Taiki Miyabe =

Japanese footballer

Personal information
- Date of birth: 16 October 1998 (age 28)
- Place of birth: Tokyo, Japan
- Height: 1.78 m (5 ft 10 in)
- Position: Defender

Team information
- Current team: Matsumoto Yamaga
- Number: 16

Youth career
- FC Nara
- –2013: FC COJB
- 2014–2016: Hosei Univ. Daini High School

College career
Years	Team	Apps	(Gls)
2017–2020	Hosei University		

Senior career*
Years	Team	Apps	(Gls)
2020–	Matsumoto Yamaga	140	(4)
- * Club domestic league appearances and goals as of 24 August 2026

Taiki Miyabe (宮部 大己, Miyabe Taiki; born 16 October 1998) is a Japanese footballer currently playing as a right-back for Matsumoto Yamaga.

== Career statistics ==
=== Club ===
As of 22 April 2021.

Club	Season	League			National Cup		League Cup		Other		Total	
Club	Season	Division	Apps	Goals	Apps	Goals	Apps	Goals	Apps	Goals	Apps	Goals
Matsumoto Yamaga	2020	J2 League	0	0	0	0	0	0	0	0	0	0
Matsumoto Yamaga	2021	J2 League	1	0	0	0	0	0	0	0	1	0
Career total			1	0	0	0	0	0	0	0	1	0
