= Shunsuke Tachino =

Japanese footballer

Shunsuke Tachino 舘野 俊祐
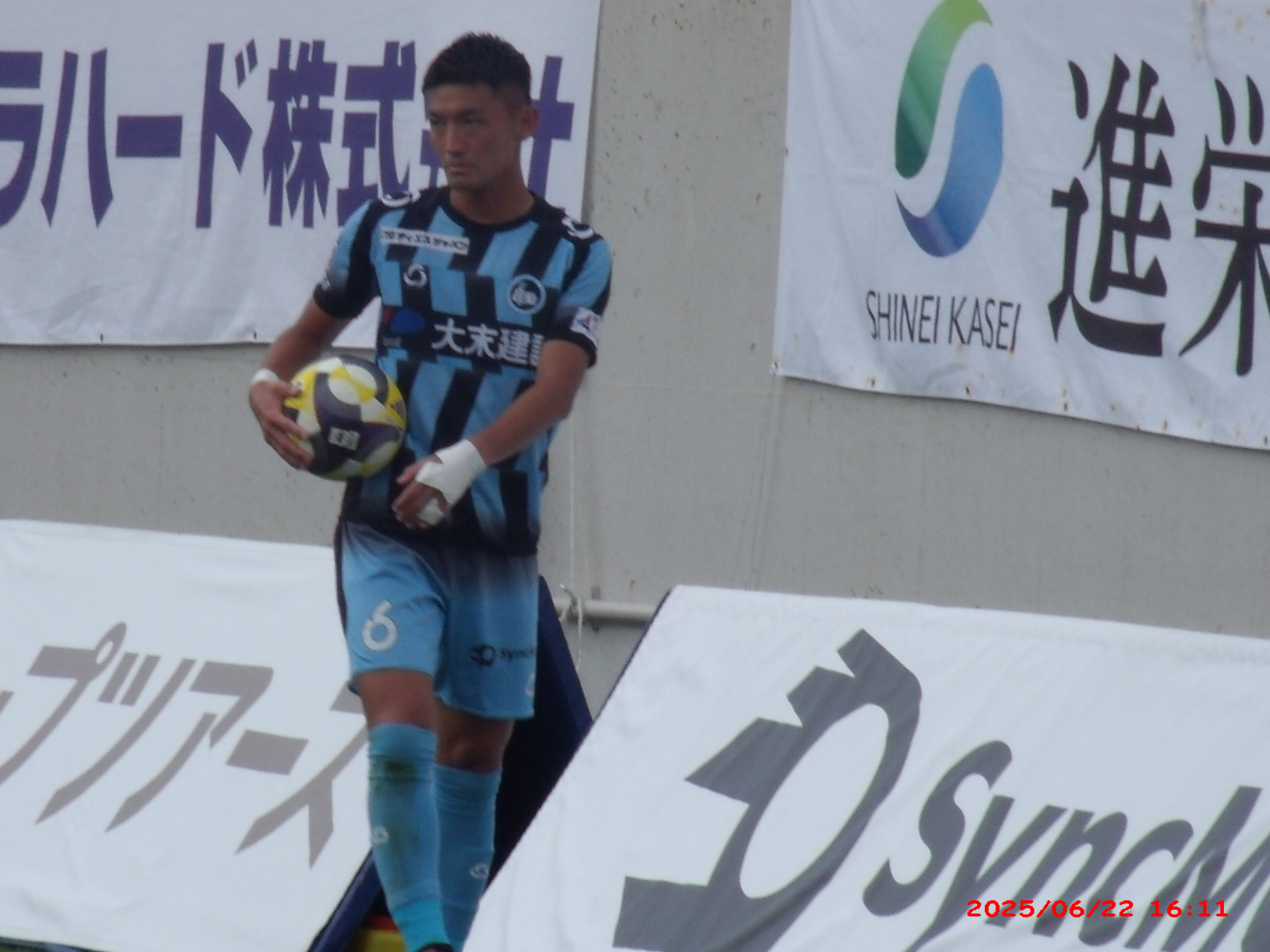
- Tachino in 2025.

Personal information
- Full name: Shunsuke Tachino
- Date of birth: May 19, 1993 (age 33)
- Place of birth: Toyama, Japan
- Height: 1.75 m (5 ft 9 in)
- Position: Defender

Team information
- Current team: FC Osaka
- Number: 6

Youth career
- 2009–2011: Tokyo Verdy

Senior career*
Years	Team	Apps	(Gls)
2012–2014	Tokyo Verdy	5	(0)
2012–2013	→ Kataller Toyama (loan)	7	(0)
2015	Matsue City FC	12	(6)
2016–	FC Osaka	267	(19)
- * Club domestic league appearances and goals as of 18 August 2026

Shunsuke Tachino (舘野 俊祐, Tachino Shunsuke; born May 19, 1993) is a Japanese football player. He plays for FC Osaka.

== Club statistics ==
Updated to 20 February 2018.

Club performance			League		Cup		Total	
Season	Club	League	Apps	Goals	Apps	Goals	Apps	Goals
Japan			League		Emperor's Cup		Total	
2012	Tokyo Verdy	J2 League	0	0	–		0	0
2012	Kataller Toyama	J2 League	0	0	1	0	1	0
2013	Kataller Toyama	J2 League	7	0	1	0	8	0
2014	Tokyo Verdy	J2 League	5	0	0	0	5	0
2015	Matsue City FC	JRL (Chūgoku)	13	6	2	0	15	6
2016	FC Osaka	JFL	10	0	–		10	0
2017	FC Osaka	JFL	25	3	2	1	27	4
Total			47	3	2	1	49	4
