= Heiwado HATO Stadium =

Multi-purpose stadium in Hikone City, Shiga Prefecture, Japan

- 平和堂HATOスタジアム
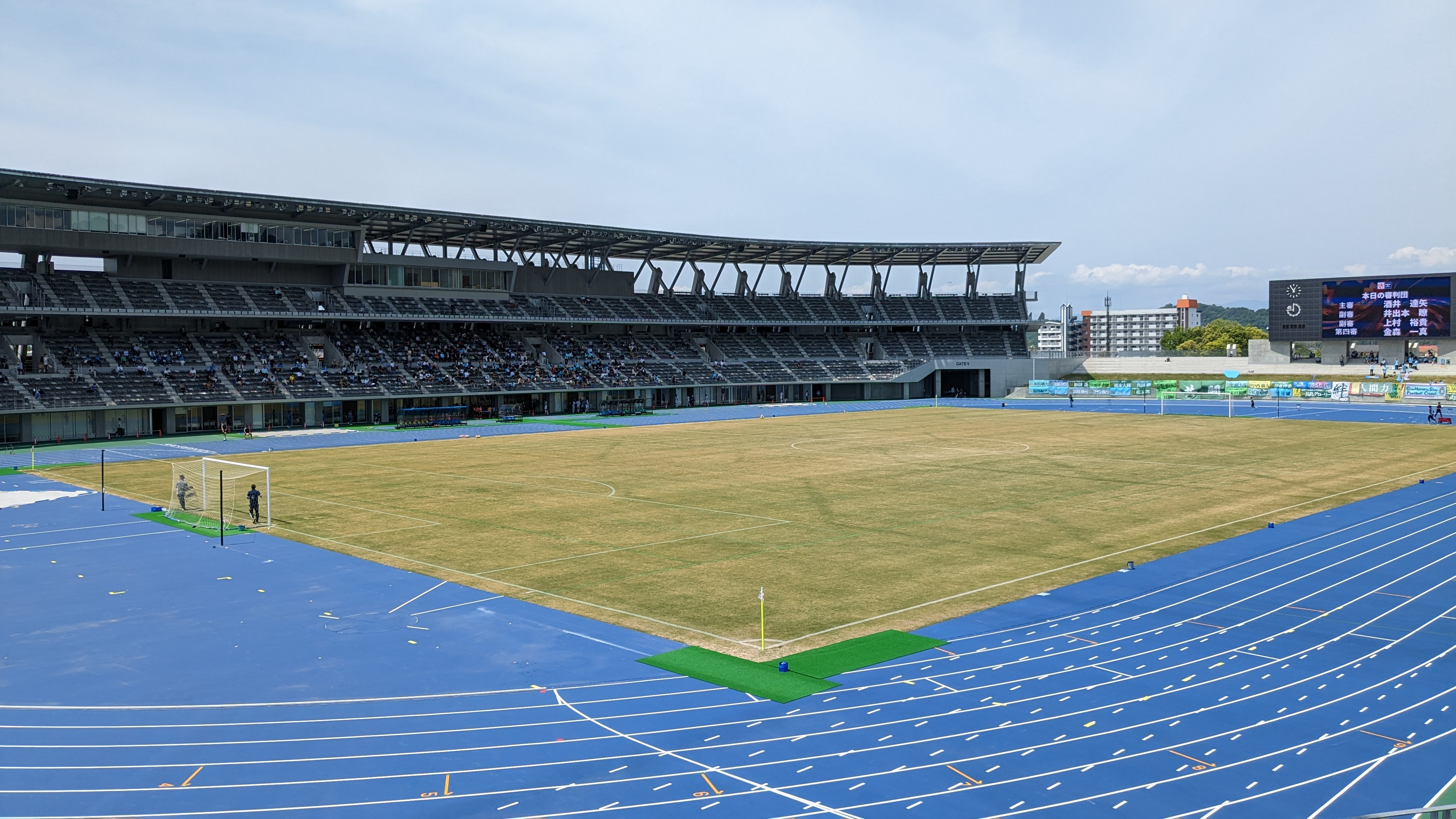
- View of running track and football field
- Interactive map of Heiwado HATO Stadium
- Full name: Heiwado HATO Stadium
- Address: 3028 Matsubaracho, Hikone City, Shiga, Japan
- Location: Hikone, Shiga, Japan
- Coordinates: 35°16′56″N 136°15′18″E
- Owner: Shiga Prefecture
- Seating type: Stadium seating
- Capacity: 15,000 approx. (Note: The J.League lists the capacity as 6,444.)
- Type: Stadium
- Event: Sporting events
- Surface: Grass
- Record attendance: Football: 9,006 (Reilac Shiga vs. Azul Claro Numazu, 7 December 2025)
- Field size: 107 × 71 m
- Public transit: JR West: Biwako Line at Hikone Station Ohmi Railway: ■ Main Line at Hikone Station

Construction
- Groundbreaking: March 2020
- Built: March 2020–December 2022
- Opened: April 2023
- Architects: AXS Satow; Katabuchi Architects Office
- Main contractors: Kajima Corporation; Sasagawa-gumi; Itogumi

Tenant
- Reilac Shiga

Website
- Official website

Heiwado HATO Stadium (平和堂HATOスタジアム) is a multi-purpose outdoor stadium at Hikone General Sports Park in Hikone City, Shiga, Japan, with a capacity of approximately 15,000. Opened in 2023, it was the main venue of the 2025 National Sports Festival, and the football club Reilac Shiga have played home matches there since 2023.

== History ==
=== Background ===
Shiga Prefecture had no facilities that met the National Sports Festival facility standards, and securing an athletics stadium that could also host the opening and closing ceremonies became an urgent issue. In May 2014, the Shiga preparation committee for the 79th National Sports Festival selected the prefecture-owned Hikone General Sports Park as the main venue, based on its everyday usability, future potential, contribution to the local area and promotion of sport. The ground was to be redeveloped as an urban park, with an athletics stadium meeting Class 1 standards.

The existing ground covered about 14 hectares and included a Class 2 athletics stadium with a capacity of 6,000, a 10,000-seat baseball stadium, a tennis complex, a swimming centre and a sports hall with accommodation. Under the prefecture's basic concept, the site would be expanded to about 22 hectares by acquiring adjacent land. A new Class 1 stadium with a capacity of 15,000–20,000 and an infield usable for football and other sports would be built alongside a Class 3 auxiliary stadium. The baseball stadium would be retained, the swimming centre would be relocated, and the sports hall would not be rebuilt.

The plans also called for the park to harmonise with its surroundings, in particular Hikone Castle, which was then seeking World Heritage status, and allowed for the stadium to be expanded in future to meet J.League requirements.

=== Construction and opening ===
Construction of the new stadium began in March 2020. It was designed by AXS Satow and Katabuchi Architects Office, with Kajima Corporation, Sasagawa-gumi and Itogumi as contractors.

The building was completed in December 2022, and the stadium opened for use in April 2023. It was built to Class 1 standard, making it the only stadium in the prefecture capable of hosting international athletics competitions. As well as athletics, it can host football, American football and rugby.

=== 2025 National Sports Festival ===
The stadium was the main venue of the 79th National Sports Festival of Japan, hosted by Shiga Prefecture in 2025. It staged the opening ceremony on 29 September 2025, and the athletics events from 3 to 7 October.

=== Football ===
The first football match played at the stadium was a first-round Emperor's Cup tie on 21 May 2023, in which Reilac Shiga beat J3 League club Azul Claro Numazu 2–1 after extra time.

Shiga Prefecture had originally planned a 20,000-capacity stadium, with 15,000 seats, to meet J2 licensing standards. However, the J.League ruled that Hikone was too far from the club's traditional base in Kusatsu for the stadium to become its permanent home.

In October 2023, ahead of the club's application to join the J.League, Reilac launched a crowdfunding campaign to improve the stadium's lighting. Tests in November 2023 confirmed that temporary lighting towers in the corners, used alongside the existing floodlights, could maintain the required illumination, and the club was granted a J3 licence later that month.

== Structure and facilities ==
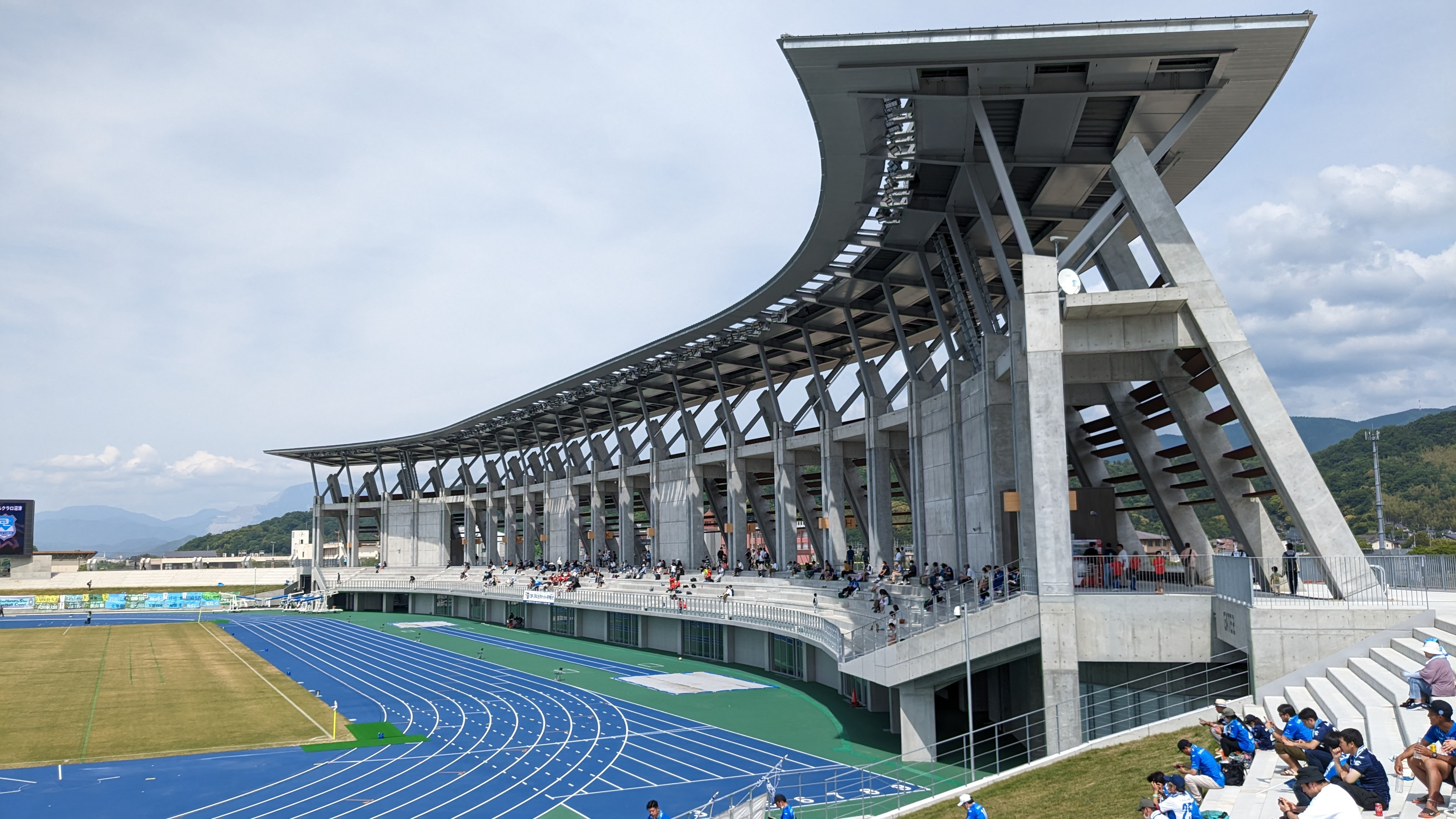
Back Stand

The stadium's design was based on five concepts: compactness, respect for the historical landscape, circulation around the stadium, reduced environmental impact, and safety and security.

It is a reinforced concrete structure with partial steel framing, standing five storeys above ground, with a total floor area of 24,043 m^{2} and a building area of 14,235 m^{2}. Its stated capacity is approximately 15,000, including 7,000 seats in the main stand, although the J.League lists the capacity as 6,444.

The stadium has a 400-metre, nine-lane running track with an all-weather surface. The athletics facilities include shared long jump and triple jump pits, three pole vault pits, five high jump pits, and areas for shot put, javelin, discus and hammer throw events. The infield is Tifton grass measuring approximately 107 by 71 metres, suitable for football and American football. For football matches, there are seated stands along both sides of the pitch, with grass banks behind each goal.

A large LED screen in the stands can display scoring layouts for football, rugby and American football, and a photo finish system is installed for athletics. The stadium also contains five changing rooms, eleven conference rooms, and an exhibition corner intended to display material on the National Sports Festival and tourist information for Hikone.

Hikone Castle and Mount Ibuki are visible from the stands. The stadium is the largest in Shiga Prefecture, and a large roof covers all of the stands.

== Naming rights ==
In early 2023, Shiga Prefecture agreed a naming rights contract with the supermarket chain Heiwado, which is headquartered in Hikone, giving the stadium the name Heiwado HATO Stadium. A name unveiling ceremony was held on 13 May 2023. The contract is worth ¥10 million (US$63,164.81) per year and runs for five years, until the end of March 2028.

== Transport ==
=== Train ===
- Hikone is connected by train to both Kyoto and Nagoya. From Kyōto Station, rapid trains take about 50 minutes.
- 20-minute walk from Hikone Station on the Biwako Line or the Ohmi Railway Main Line.

=== Car ===
- 5-minute drive from Hikone Station by car or taxi.
- On-site parking is available for approximately 150 cars.

=== Bus ===
- Take the Kokoku Bus Hikone Loop Line Route 21 from Hikone Station and get off at the "Hikone General Sports Park" bus stop.

== See also ==
- List of football stadiums in Japan
