= Norimichi Yamamoto =

Japanese footballer

Norimichi Yamamoto 山本 義道
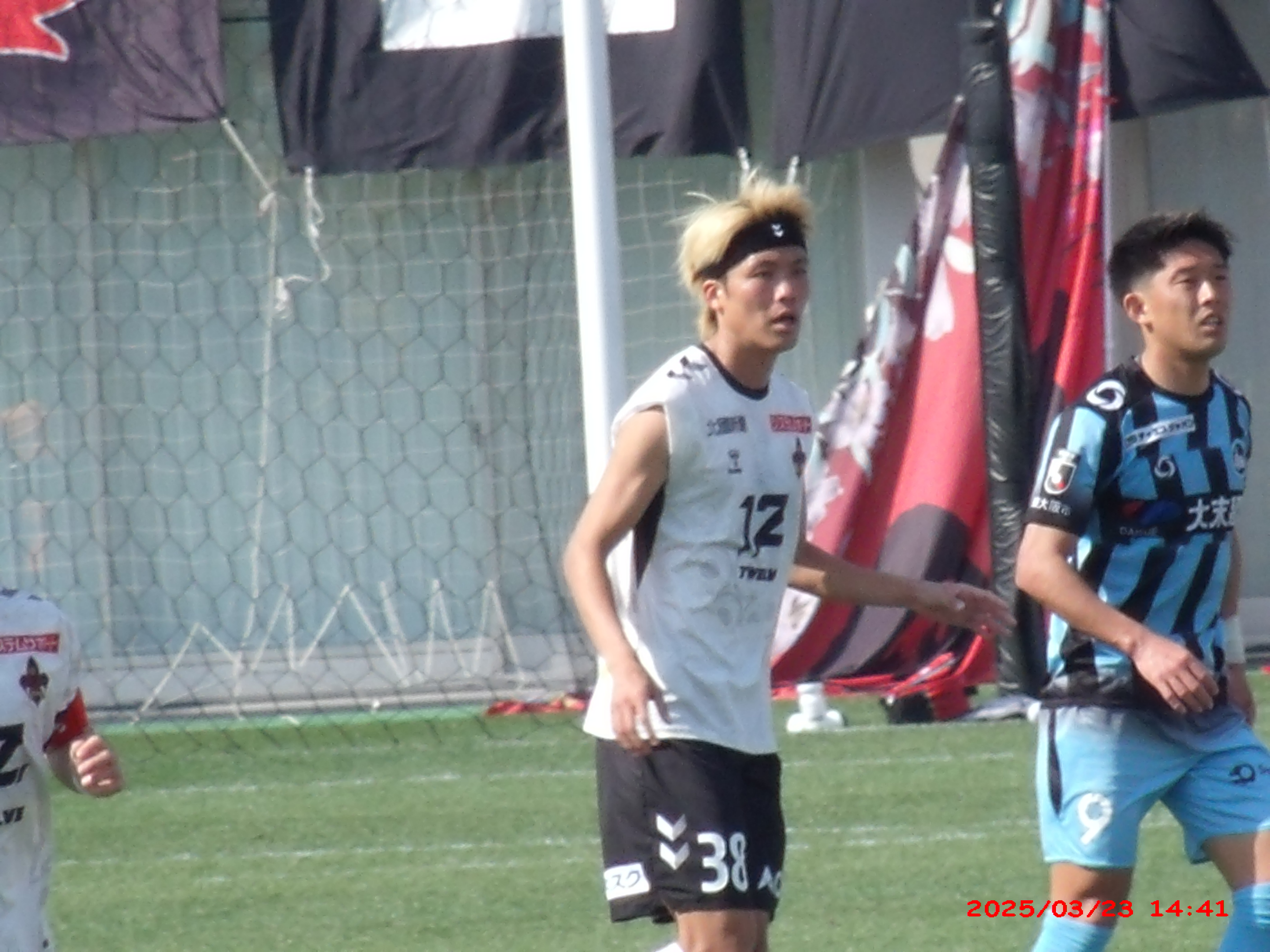
- From left Norimichi Yamamoto and on right Takumi Shimada

Personal information
- Full name: Norimichi Yamamoto
- Date of birth: July 25, 1995 (age 31)
- Place of birth: Fukuoka, Japan
- Height: 1.85 m (6 ft 1 in)
- Position: Defender

Team information
- Current team: Zweigen Kanazawa
- Number: 2

Youth career
- 2008–2010: FC NEO
- 2011–2013: Sakuyo High School

College career
Years	Team	Apps	(Gls)
2014–2017	Biwako Seikei Sport College		

Senior career*
Years	Team	Apps	(Gls)
2018–2019	Zweigen Kanazawa	53	(4)
2020	Yokohama F. Marinos	0	(0)
2020	→ Júbilo Iwata (loan)	22	(0)
2021–2023	Júbilo Iwata	59	(2)
2023–	Zweigen Kanazawa	85	(3)
- * Club domestic league appearances and goals as of 21 August 2026

Norimichi Yamamoto (山本 義道, Yamamoto Norimichi; born July 25, 1995) is a Japanese football player, currently playing for Zweigen Kanazawa.

== Playing career ==
Yamamoto was born in Fukuoka Prefecture on July 25, 1995. After graduating from Biwako Seikei Sport College, he joined J2 League club Zweigen Kanazawa in 2018.

== Club statistics ==
Updated to 8 August 2022.

Appearances and goals by club, season and competition
Club	Season	League			Emperor's Cup		J.League Cup		Total	
Club	Season	Division	Apps	Goals	Apps	Goals	Apps	Goals	Apps	Goals
Zweigen Kanazawa	2018	J2 League	13	1	0	0	—		13	1
Zweigen Kanazawa	2019	J2 League	40	3	0	0	—		40	3
Júbilo Iwata	2020	J2 League	22	0	-		-		22	0
Júbilo Iwata	2021	J2 League	35	1	2	0	-		37	1
Júbilo Iwata	2022	J1 League	16	1	2	0	5	0	23	1
Total			126	6	4	0	5	0	135	6
