= FC Osaka =

Japanese football club

FC Osaka FC大阪
- Full name: Football Club Osaka
- Founded: 1996; 30 years ago
- Ground: Hanazono Rugby Stadium
- Capacity: 27,346
- Chairman: Yusuke Kondo
- Manager: Naoto Otake
- League: J3 League
- 2025: J3 League, 3rd of 20
- Website: fc-osaka.com
Home colours	Away colours

FC Osaka (FC大阪, Efu Shī Osaka) is a Japanese football club based in Higashiōsaka, Osaka Prefecture. They currently play in J3 League, the third tier of professional football league in the Japanese football league system.

== History ==
FC Osaka was founded in 1996. 11 years after its foundation, in 2007, the team won the Osaka Prefectural Football League Division 1 for the first time. In 2010, they participated in the Shakaijin Cup for the first time, losing to Norbritz Hokkaido in the first round). In 2011, they won the 1st Division of the Osaka Prefectural League for the 3rd time in three consecutive years. The club won the Kansai Prefectural Soccer League Final Tournament, and was then promoted to the Kansai Soccer League Division 2. From this year onwards, the club's operating corporation was changed from "Nippon Entertainment Group Co., Ltd." to "R Dash Co., Ltd.".

=== Six years at Regional League level ===
In 2012, they won the Kansai Soccer League 2nd Division with 13 wins and 1 loss, including an uncommon run of 10 consecutive wins that started on their debut match at the tournament, and this contributed to their promotion to the Kansai Soccer League 1st Division. In 2013, the club won the Division 1 with 12 wins and 2 draws, remaining unbeaten at the competition. However, on the Regional Champions League, they weren't able to finish in a position that would enable them to get a promotion, exiting the competition at the group stage. On the same year, it was established the women's teamm, "FC Osaka CRAVO".

In 2014, they won The KSL Island Shield of Awaji, they won the Shakaijin Cup, and the Osaka Prefectural Soccer Championship for the first time. That win enabled them to qualify, and make their debut at the Emperor's Cup. FC Osaka lost to Zweigen Kanazawa in the first round. But, this Emperor's Cup loss in the middle of the year didn't reflected how the rest of the season would go, as it resulted favorably for the Osaka-based team. After winning the Shakaijin Cup, the club was runners-up at the Regional Champions League, granting them the possibility of promotion for the Japan Football League (Japan's 4th tier league), only pending the JFL Board of Directors approval, which was given on 10 December.

=== Eight-year stint at JFL ===
In 2015, they triumphed over Cerezo Osaka in the first round of the Emperor's Cup. In 2018, the "General Incorporated Association FC Osaka Sports Club" management corporation was formed as a step towards joining the J League. In their fourth year in the JFL, FC Osaka achieved their best-ever result, finishing as runners-up. On November 27 of the same year, the club was approved to establish Higashiosaka City as their hometown. Higashiosaka is also home to the Hanazono Rugby Stadium, which underwent significant renovations ahead of the 2019 Rugby World Cup.

On 26 November 2019, FC Osaka and Higashiosaka City signed an agreement to renovate the second ground of Higashiosaka Hanazono Rugby Stadium. The aging facility was upgraded with seating for over 5,000 spectators, preparing for a potential promotion to the J3 League. A roof was added to one of the stands, and the stand behind the goal was sloped. FC Osaka fully funded the construction and donated the completed project to Higashiosaka City. The renovation was successfully completed by December 2021. On the same day, the club also submitted documents for J.League admission, applying for the "J.League 100 Year Plan club status," a necessary step for joining the league.

On 25 February 2020, FC Osaka received J.League approval for their submitted documents, earning 100-year plan club status. Later, on 30 June, they applied for a J3 League license, aiming for promotion by 2021. The J.League issued the license on 15 September. However, FC Osaka couldn't secure promotion to the J3 League in 2020, as they were placed 9th when the league was abandoned. In 2021, they faced a similar outcome, finishing 7th, just two points short of the Top 4.

In 2021, the top team's name FC Osaka was changed to F.C. Osaka (F.C.大阪, Efu. Sī. Osaka) as of 1 January that year. "FC" not only means "football club", but also various fields (Field), foundation / substrate (Foundation), for people (For people) "F" ” and the “C” which stands for Community contribution, Cooperation, Confidence and Creation. Osaka” was changed to “F.C.Osaka” (English notation: F.C.✩OSAKA).

On 12 January 2022, the name was changed back to FC Osaka.

=== Promotion to J3 ===
On November 5, FC Osaka achieved promotion to the J3 League for the first time in their history, after spending eight seasons in the Japan Football League. Just 15 days later, the club secured their place as runners-up by exceeding the 2,000 minimum average home attendance and finishing with a 10-goal difference over Nara Club, who were crowned champions. Although FC Osaka had one more win than Nara, they also suffered two more losses. This narrow gap between them and the champions, however, highlighted the hard-fought journey to promotion, where they will compete in the J3 League starting from the 2023 season.

On 25 September 2025, FC Osaka announced they had officially acquired a J2 License after a J.League board meeting.

== Stadium ==
FC Osaka will play all their matches of the 2023 J3 League season at Hanazono Rugby Stadium, as confirmed with the release of the full league fixture calendar on 20 January 2023.

== League & cup record ==
Champions	Runners-up	Third place	Promoted	Relegated

League														J. League Cup	Emperor's Cup	Shakaijin Cup
Season	Division	Tier	Teams	Pos.	P	W	D	L	F	A	GD	Pts	Attendance/G	J. League Cup	Emperor's Cup	Shakaijin Cup
2008	Osaka Prefectural; League (Div. 1)	6	17	3rd	15	12	0	3	53	12	41	36		Not eligible	Did not qualify	Did not qualify
2009	Osaka Prefectural; League (Div. 1)	6	17	1st	15	12	2	1	61	12	49	38		Not eligible	Did not qualify	Did not qualify
2010	Osaka Prefectural; League (Div. 1)	6	17	1st	15	12	2	1	76	14	62	38		Not eligible	Did not qualify	Did not qualify
2011	Osaka Prefectural; League (Div. 1)	6	17	1st	15	15	0	0	73	9	64	45		Not eligible	Did not qualify	Did not qualify
2012	Kansai Soccer; League (Div. 2)	5	8	1st	14	13	0	1	52	7	45	36		Not eligible	Did not qualify	2nd round
2013	Kansai Soccer League (Div. 1)	4	8	1st	14	12	2	0	38	7	31	38		Not eligible	Did not qualify	Quarter final
2014	Kansai Soccer League (Div. 1)	5	8	2nd	14	9	4	1	37	15	22	31		Not eligible	1st round	Winners
2015	JFL	4	16	8th	30	13	5	12	45	35	10	44	692	Not eligible	2nd round	Not eligible
2016	JFL	4	16	5th	30	18	4	8	52	31	21	58	986	Not eligible	-	Not eligible
2017	JFL	4	16	4th	30	16	7	7	59	32	27	55	597	Not eligible	2nd round	Not eligible
2018	JFL	4	16	2nd	30	18	3	9	54	34	20	57	788	Not eligible	2nd round	Not eligible
2019	JFL	4	16	8th	30	10	10	10	33	32	1	40	1,098	Not eligible	2nd round	Not eligible
2020	JFL	4	16	8th	15	6	2	7	24	24	0	20	712	Not eligible	Did not qualify	Not eligible
2021	JFL	4	17	7th	32	13	9	10	37	35	2	48	516	Not eligible	2nd round	Not eligible
2022	JFL	4	16	2nd	30	17	8	5	47	34	13	59	2,563	Not eligible	Did not qualify	Not eligible
2023	J3	3	20	11th	38	14	11	13	41	38	3	53	2,680	Not eligible	Did not qualify	Not eligible
2024	J3	3	20	6th	38	15	13	10	43	31	12	58	2,470	1st round	Did not qualify	Not eligible
2025	J3	3	20	3rd	38	21	8	9	55	33	22	71	2,698	1st round	1st round	Not eligible
2026	J3	3	40	31st	18	3	8	7	15	18	-3	20	2,809	N/A	N/A	Not eligible
2026-27	J3	3	20	TBD	38									TBD	TBD	Not eligible

Key

- Pos. = Position in league; P = Games played; W = Games won; D = Games drawn; L = Games lost; F = Goals scored; A = Goals conceded; GD = Goals difference; Pts = Points gained.
- Source JFL

== Honours ==
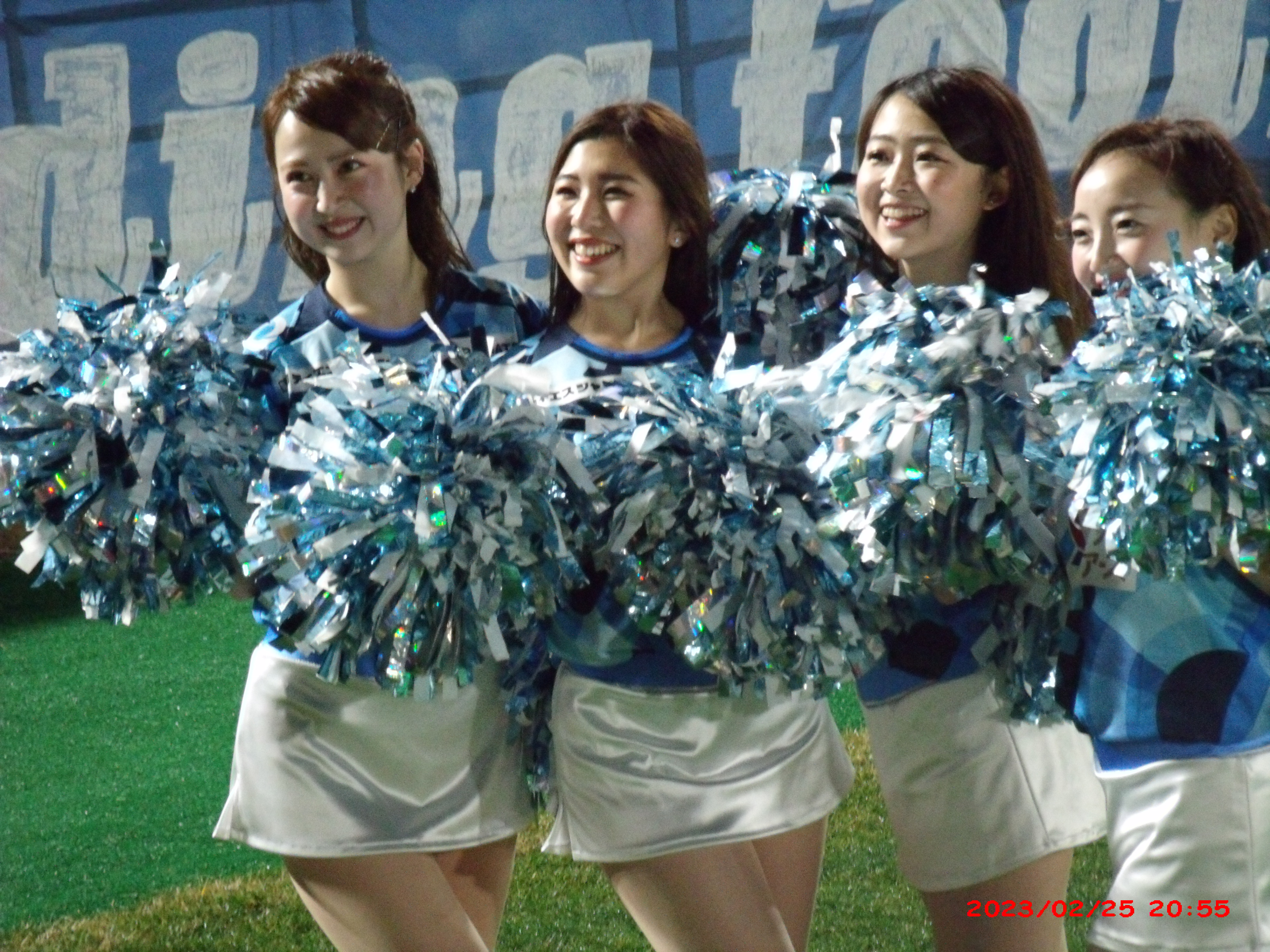
FC Osaka Cheerleaders

FC Osaka Honours
Honour	No.	Years
Osaka Prefectural League Div. 1	3	2009, 2010, 2011
Kansai Soccer League Div. 2	1	2012
Kansai Soccer League Div. 1	1	2014
Shakaijin Cup	1	2014

== Players ==
=== Current squad ===
As of 1 August 2026.

Note: Flags indicate national team as defined under FIFA eligibility rules; some limited exceptions apply. Players may hold more than one non-FIFA nationality.

No.	Pos.	Nation	Player
1	GK	JPN	Hiromichi Sugawara
2	DF	JPN	Kakeru Sakamoto
4	DF	JPN	Ryoji Yamashita
5	DF	JPN	Yuto Minakuchi
6	DF	JPN	Shunsuke Tachino
7	MF	JPN	Takahiro Kitsui
8	MF	JPN	Asahi Haga
9	FW	JPN	Takumi Shimada
10	FW	JPN	Rikuto Kubo
11	MF	JPN	Gentaro Yoshida (on loan from JEF United Chiba)
13	DF	JPN	Kazuya Mima
14	MF	JPN	Sho Sumida
15	MF	JPN	Kazuki Fukui
16	DF	JPN	Keita Tanaka
17	MF	JPN	Shunta Morimura (on loan from Mito HollyHock)
18	MF	JPN	Yamato Natsukawa
21	MF	JPN	Hiroki Kimura
22	DF	JPN	Shuto Asano
23	DF	JPN	Takuya Akiyama
25	DF	JPN	Riku Kuwako

No.	Pos.	Nation	Player
28	FW	JPN	Toshiki Toya
29	FW	JPN	Ryunosuke Sugawara (on loan from Vegalta Sendai)
30	GK	KOR	Han Junyoung
32	MF	JPN	Hiroto Toriyama
33	DF	KOR	Ma Sang-hoon
34	MF	JPN	Kazuki Iwamoto
35	DF	KOR	Shin Kyuwon
37	FW	BRA	Rigley (on loan from Capivariano)
38	MF	JPN	Shuto Ogawa
39	MF	JPN	Taiyo Kawada
41	MF	JPN	Ryusei Nose
42	DF	BRA	John Angelini
43	DF	BRA	Yago Zamora (on loan from Fluminense SC)
52	DF	JPN	Masaya Kojima
78	MF	JPN	Shoki Nagano
88	GK	JPN	Riku Umeda (on loan from Vegalta Sendai)
95	FW	JPN	Kohei Isa
98	GK	JPN	Taiga Nagano
99	FW	BRA	Vinícius Souza

=== Out on loan ===
Note: Flags indicate national team as defined under FIFA eligibility rules; some limited exceptions apply. Players may hold more than one non-FIFA nationality.

No.	Pos.	Nation	Player
20	DF	JPN	Oki Sakimoto (at Taichung Futuro)
40	MF	JPN	Ryu Kawakami (at Zweigen Kanazawa)
66	DF	KOR	Kim Yoon-sik (at FC Jurong)

== Club officials ==
Position	Staff
Manager	(Japan) Naoto Otake
Assistant manager	(Japan) Hiroshi Otsuki
Analyst coach	(Japan) Masahiro Hirano
Goalkeeper coach	(Japan) Shinsuke Yoshioka
Physical coach	(Japan) Toshinori Ito
Chief trainer	(Japan) Koji Iwaki
Trainer	(Japan) Koki Ogata
Physical trainer	(Japan) Naotoshi Izuike
Medical trainer	(Japan) Yoshihiro Ike
Competent	(Japan) Naoki Urakawa
Side affairs	(Japan) Taito Sebe
Doctor	(Japan) Satoshi Sobajima (Japan) Tomohiro Tomihara
Physiotherapist	(Japan) Keita Morimoto
Groundkeeper	(Japan) Makoto Oogi
Sports data science director	(Japan) Yuichiro Iwasaki
Technical staff	(Japan) Shinya Tsukahara
Stadium MC	(Japan) Rina Ishizuka
Stadium DJ	(Japan) Yuji Yamashita

== Managerial history ==
As of 15 December 2022

Manager	Nationality	Tenure	
Manager	Nationality	Start	Finish
Masami Ogawa	Japan	1 February 2007	31 July 2008
Shigeru Morioka	Japan	1 August 2008	31 December 2015
Haruo Wada	Japan	1 February 2016	31 January 2020
Shinya Tsukahara	Japan	1 February 2020	31 January 2023
Ryo Shigaki	Japan	1 February 2023	31 January 2024
Naoto Otake	Japan	1 February 2024	present

== Kit evolution ==
FP 1st
2015	2016	2017	2018	2019
2020	2021	2022	2023	2024
2025	2026 -			

FP 2nd
2015	2016	2017	2018	2019
2020	2021	2022	2023	2024 -
2025	2026 -			

== Partnerships ==
On September 2, 2014, FC Osaka announced a partnership with Sporting Clube de Macau, which makes the transfer of players between Macau and Japan possible.
