= Yuki Okada (footballer, born 1996) =

Japanese footballer

Personal information
- Date of birth: 13 May 1996 (age 30)
- Place of birth: Kawasaki, Kanagawa, Japan
- Height: 1.72 m (5 ft 8 in)
- Position: Midfielder

Team information
- Current team: Fukushima United FC
- Number: 8

Youth career
- Noborito SC
- –2014: Kawasaki Frontale

College career
Years	Team	Apps	(Gls)
2015–2018	Waseda University		

Senior career*
Years	Team	Apps	(Gls)
2019–2022	Machida Zelvia	83	(4)
2022	Tegevajaro Miyazaki	23	(14)
2023	Giravanz Kitakyushu	18	(3)
2024–2025	Nara Club	73	(22)
2026–	Fukushima United FC	23	(6)
- * Club domestic league appearances and goals as of 25 August 2026

Yuki Okada (岡田 優希, Okada Yūki; born 13 May 1996) is a Japanese professional footballer who plays as a midfielder for Fukushima United FC.
