= Shusuke Yonehara =

Japanese footballer

Personal information
- Date of birth: April 20, 1998 (age 28)
- Place of birth: Kumamoto, Japan
- Height: 1.84 m (6 ft 1/2 in)
- Position: Midfielder

Team information
- Current team: Thespa Gunma
- Number: 6

Youth career
- –2016: Roasso Kumamoto

Senior career*
Years	Team	Apps	(Gls)
2017–2018	Roasso Kumamoto	30	(0)
2019–2025	Matsumoto Yamaga FC	83	(1)
2022–2023	→ Ventforet Kofu (loan)	1	(0)
2025–	Thespa Gunma	23	(2)
Total		137	(3)
- * Club domestic league appearances and goals as of 25 August 2026

Shusuke Yonehara (米原 秀亮, Yonehara Shūsuke; born April 20, 1998) is a Japanese football player, currently playing for Thespa Gunma.

== Career ==
Shusuke Yonehara joined J2 League club Roasso Kumamoto in 2015. He debuted in Emperor's Cup.

== Career statistics ==
Last update: 27 February 2019

Appearances and goals by club, season and competition
Club	Season	League			Emperor's Cup		J.League Cup		Total	
Club	Season	Division	Apps	Goals	Apps	Goals	Apps	Goals	Apps	Goals
Roasso Kumamoto	2015	J2 League	0	0	2	0	—		2	0
Roasso Kumamoto	2016	J2 League	0	0	0	0	—		0	0
Roasso Kumamoto	2017	J2 League	3	0	2	0	—		5	0
Roasso Kumamoto	2018	J2 League	27	0	1	0	—		28	0
Career total			30	0	5	0	0	0	35	0
