= J3 League =

- Organising body: J.League
- Founded: 2013; 13 years ago
- Country: Japan
- Confederation: AFC
- Number of clubs: 20
- Level on pyramid: 3
- Promotion to: J2 League
- Relegation to: Japan Football League
- Domestic cup: Emperor's Cup
- League cup: J.League Cup
- Current champions: Tochigi City (1st title) (2025)
- Most championships: Blaublitz Akita (2 titles)
- Broadcaster(s): DAZN
- Website: Official website (in English)
- Current: 2026–27 J3 League

J3 League (Japanese: J3リーグ, Hepburn: J3 Rīgu) or simply J3 is the third division of the Japan Professional Football League (日本プロサッカーリーグ, Nihon Puro Sakkā Rīgu). It was established in 2013 as the third-tier professional association football league in Japan under the organization of J.League. The league is known as the Meiji Yasuda J3 League (明治安田J3リーグ) for sponsorship reasons.

The third-tier nationwide league is a relatively recent development in Japanese football with a first attempt made in 1992 (second division of the old JFL), though it only lasted for two seasons. In 1999, following the establishment of J2 League, a new Japan Football League was created to comprise the third tier and lower divisions. After the introduction of J3, the JFL was demoted to the fourth-tier nationwide league, for the first time in history of Japanese football.

== History of Japanese third-tier football ==
=== Amateur era (until 2013) ===
A national third tier of Japanese association football was first established along with its professionalization in 1992, when the newly created Japan Football League kicked off with two tiers below the professional J. League. Among the 10 original clubs of the third tier included the forerunners to Kyoto Sanga FC, Ventforet Kofu, Omiya Ardija, Avispa Fukuoka and Vissel Kobe (the latter two being located in different regions from their J. League successors). But after a number of clubs were lost for various reasons – some were promoted to J.League and the others folded – the league contracted the second division in 1994 and continued with the single second-tier division.

The third tier football was reintroduced in 1999 upon creation of fully professional J2. The old JFL was dissolved but a new Japan Football League was formed the same year in order to establish a nationwide top-tier amateur league. But despite its officially amateur status the league quickly became de facto semi-professional, serving as the cradle of the future J. League members. Since the establishment of associate membership system in 2006 the number of professional clubs holding or actively seeking for this status has grown steadily and reached its peak in 2013 season when 6 full members and 2 former candidates made up to almost half of the league's 18 teams. Through the course of the season this number grew even bigger, to 10 full associate members that formed the core of J3.

=== Professionalization and establishment (2013) ===
Close to the end of 2012 football season Japanese media began to spread rumors about the upcoming professional third-tier league, referred to as either "J3" or "J.Challenge League". Most of the sources agreed that the new league would feature around 10–12 clubs, most of which became associate members. The league would also provide more relaxed licensing criteria in comparison to J2 – e.g. the stadium seating capacity of just 3,000 with no mandatory floodlighting.

After the discussion on J1-J2 Joint Committee on 16 January 2013, all J.League clubs agreed in principle with an establishment of the new league starting 2014. This decision was formally put into force by J.League Council in a 26 February executive meeting. The league was planned to launch with 10 teams, but another session of J.League Council in July decided that inaugural season of J3 would feature 12 teams.

To participate, a club must have held an associate membership, or have submitted an application before 30 June 2013, and then passed an inspection to obtain a participation licence issued by J.League Council. On 19 November, J.League confirmed the following clubs to participate in the inaugural J3 season:

- Gainare Tottori (relegated from 2013 J.League Division 2)
- Blaublitz Akita (JFL)
- Machida Zelvia (JFL)
- SC Sagamihara (JFL)
- Nagano Parceiro (JFL)
- Zweigen Kanazawa (JFL)
- YSCC Yokohama (JFL)
- FC Ryukyu (JFL)
- Fukushima United (JFL)
- Fujieda MYFC (JFL)
- Grulla Morioka (Tōhoku League, 2013 Tōhoku League Champion and Regional Promotion Series Champion)
- J.League U-22 team, composed of the best J1 and J2 youngsters to prepare them for the 2016 Olympics

=== Future plans ===
The league has not provided a clear expansion timeline yet but it was most likely that J3 continued to accommodate new teams after its inaugural season. The following is a list of clubs that may get promoted to J.League in the near future:

- Cobaltore Onagawa (Tohoku Soccer League) – J.League 100 Year Plan club status
- Criacao Shinjuku (JFL) – J3 license and J.League 100 Year Plan club status
- Nankatsu SC (KSL Division 1) – J.League 100 Year Plan club status
- Reilac Shiga FC (formerly MIO Biwako Shiga; JFL) – J3 license holders
- ReinMeer Aomori (JFL) – J3 license holders
- Tokyo 23 FC (KSL Division 1) – J.League 100 Year Plan club status
- Veertien Mie (JFL) – J3 license holders
- Verspah Oita (JFL) – J3 license holders
- Vonds Ichihara (KSL Division 1) – J.League 100 Year Plan club status

Other teams have applied for the 100 Year plan status or a J3 license but were denied. Most of these clubs continue to aim for J3 as their ultimate goal.

- None

Four teams, one withdrew its J3 license, two their 100 Year Plan status, formerly associate membership, and another was deprived of both:

- Okinawa SV (JFL)
- Atletico Suzuka Club (JFL)
- Tokyo Musashino City FC (JFL)
- Tonan Maebashi (KSL Division 1)

Some sources claimed that J3 was intended to reach up to 60 clubs in the future, being split into three regionalized divisions running in parallel.

At the end of January 2023, the J.League removed its 100 Year Plan status from application requirements for J3 licenses as part of revisions to the division's club licensing regulations. In December, the J.League voted to adopt a fall–spring format, beginning in 2026–27. The regular season will begin in August and pause for a winter break between December and February, with the final matches played in May.

=== Timetable ===
Year	Important events	No. J3 clubs	Prom. slots	Rel. slots
2014	The J.League adopts three divisions, as the following clubs join Division 3: Gainare Tottori (relegated from J2 League).; Blaublitz Akita, Fukushima United, Fujieda MYFC, Nagano Parceiro, FC Ryukyu, SC Sagamihara, YSCC Yokohama, FC Machida Zelvia, and Zweigen Kanazawa (pre-existing from Japan Football League).; Grulla Morioka (promoted directly from Japanese Regional Leagues' Tohoku Soccer League).; A J.League U-22 Selection is also included, composed of the best J1 and J2 youngsters to prepare them for the 2016 Olympics.; The Japan Football League becomes the nationwide fourth tier, and first tier for amateur clubs.; Zweigen Kanazawa becomes the first J3 champions and get promoted to J2. Nagano Parceiro lost the promotion/relegation Series against the J2 21st placed team.	11+1	1.5	0
2015	Kataller Toyama is relegated from J2.; Renofa Yamaguchi is promoted from Japan Football League (JFL) and in its first J3 season becomes champions and got promoted to J2.; FC Machida Zelvia is also promoted as it finished in 2nd place and won the promotion/relegation Series against newly relegated Oita Trinita, the first former J1 team to play in J3.	12+1	1.5	0
2016	Tochigi SC and Oita Trinita are relegated from J2.; Kagoshima United FC is promoted from JFL.; J. League U-22 Selection disbanded. Cerezo Osaka, Gamba Osaka and FC Tokyo introduced U-23 reserve teams to reach 16 teams and change the league to a two-round system.	13+3	1.5	0
2017	Giravanz Kitakyushu is relegated from J2.; Azul Claro Numazu is promoted from JFL.; Promotion/relegation series abolished; runner-up promoted automatically.	14+3	2	0
2018	Roasso Kumamoto and Kamatamare Sanuki are relegated from J2.; Vanraure Hachinohe is promoted from JFL.	15+3	2	0
2019	Kagoshima United and FC Gifu are relegated from J2.; FC Imabari is promoted from JFL.	16+3	2	0
2020	FC Tokyo U-23 withdraws from J3. Cerezo and Gamba Osaka dissolve their U-23s after the season.; This was the last season to feature U-23 teams.; Tegevajaro Miyazaki is promoted from JFL.	16+2	2	0
2021	SC Sagamihara, Ehime FC, Giravanz Kitakyushu, and Matsumoto Yamaga are relegated from J2.; Iwaki FC is promoted from JFL.	15	2	0
2022	Iwaki FC is promoted from JFL and in its first J3 season becomes champions and got promoted to J2.; FC Ryukyu and Iwate Grulla Morioka are relegated from J2.; Nara Club and FC Osaka are promoted from JFL.	18	2	0
2023	Omiya Ardija and Zweigen Kanazawa are relegated from J2.; This season features J3–JFL playoffs; relegation from the J3 League to the JFL is introduced.	20	2	0–2
2024	Tochigi SC, Kagoshima United and Thespa Gunma are relegated from J2.; There are promotion playoffs for the J3 with teams from 3rd to 6th place. Kataller Toyama is the inaugural winner.; Tochigi City FC and Kochi United SC are promoted from JFL. Iwate Grulla Morioka and YSCC Yokohama are the first J3 clubs relegated.	20	3	0–2
2025	Roasso Kumamoto, Renofa Yamaguchi and Ehime FC are relegated from J2.; Reilac Shiga is promoted from JFL. Azul Claro Numazu is relegated from J3.; This is the last season is spring-autumn format.	20	3	0–2
2026–27	This is first season use fall-spring format starting from August 2026 until May 2027.	20	3	0–2

== Crest ==
On 20 December 2022, the J3 League logo colour was changed to blue for the 2023 season prior to the 10th anniversary of Japan's third-tier professional league below J1 and J2, whose respective logo colours are red and green.

=== History crest ===
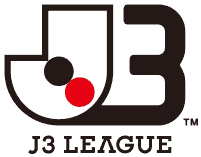
First logo (2014)

Second logo (2015–2018)

Third logo (2019–2022)

== 2026–27 season ==
=== League format ===
For this season, the league is played in two rounds (home and away), each team playing a total of 38 matches.

Each team must have at least 3 players holding professional contracts. Also, since the 2016 season, 5 foreign players are allowed per team, plus 1 more from J.League's ASEAN partner country of or from other AFC countries. The matchday roster consists of 18 players, and up to 3 substitutes are allowed in a game.

=== Promotion and relegation ===
Rules for promotion to J2 are largely similar to those of Japan Football League in recent seasons: to be promoted, a club must hold or be granted a J2 license and finish in top 2 of the league. From 2017 to 2023, the champions and the runners-up have been promoted directly and replace the 21st- and 22nd-placed J2 clubs. If only the champion or runner-up holds or is given a J2 license, only the bottom club of J2 is relegated; if both top 2 finishers are ineligible for promotion, then no teams are promoted to or relegated from J2.

Since the 2024 season, the 3rd to 6th placers have promotion playoffs and the winner is also the third team automatically promoted. The three J2 bottom-placed teams are automatically relegated to J3.

At a J.League board meeting in August 2021, 60 clubs (of which 20 are J3) were targeted for the entire league, and a possibility that J3 would have exceeded 20 clubs by the 2023 season was brought up. Mitsuru Murai, the J.League chairman, revealed that he was discussing how to adjust to 20 clubs. At this time, he was asked, "If there is a possibility of the [J3] league having 21 teams, is it okay to understand that there are teams that will fall from J3 to JFL?" While under consideration, he admitted that the J3 and JFL were considering the introduction of relegation to the latter league as early as after the 2022 season. Later in November, Murai announced that promotion from and relegation to the JFL was planned after the 2023 season,

In early January 2023, the J.League introduced the J3–JFL promotion/relegation playoffs, enabling the possibility for teams to be relegated from the J3. The system of promotion and relegation between the J3 and the JFL can be determined by the eligibility (promotion to J3 requires a J.League license) of the JFL's champions and runners-up for the season.

- If only the JFL champions hold a license, they replace automatically the J3's 20th-placed team.
- If only the JFL runners-up hold a license, there are promotion/relegation playoffs with the J3's 20th-placed team.
- If both the JFL champions and runners-up hold licenses, there are automatic exchange between the JFL champions and the J3's 20th-placed team, and the runners-up compete in two-legged playoffs with the J3's 19th-placed team.
- If both the JFL champions and runners-up do not hold licenses, no exchange takes place; the teams placed third and below in the league standings, even if one of them holds a J3 license, are not entitled to promotion and the playoffs.

=== Participating clubs (2026–27) ===
Locations of the 2026–27 J3 League teams
Kansai Region Japan Football League Teams
Greater Tokyo Area J3 League teams

Club name	Year joined	Seasons in J3	Based in	First season in D3	Seasons in D3	Current spell in D3	Last spell in J2
Ehime FC	2006 (J2)	2	Matsuyama, Ehime	2002	15	2026–	2024–2025
Fukushima United	2014	11	All cities/towns in Fukushima	2013	12	2013–	–
Gainare Tottori	2011 (J2)	11	All cities/towns in Tottori	2001	21	2014–	2011–2013
FC Gifu	2008 (J2)	5	All cities/towns in Gifu	2007	5	2020–	2008–2019
Giravanz Kitakyushu	2010 (J2)	6	Kitakyushu, Fukuoka	2008	8	2022–	2020–2021
Kagoshima United	2016	7	Kagoshima, Kagoshima	2016	7	2025–	2024
Kamatamare Sanuki	2014 (J2)	6	Takamatsu, Kagawa	2011	9	2019–	2014–2018
Kochi United	2025	1	Kōchi, Kōchi	2025	1	2025–	–
Matsumoto Yamaga	2012 (J2)	4	Central and southern cities/towns/villages in Nagano	2010	5	2022–	2020–2021
Nagano Parceiro	2014	11	Northern and eastern cities/towns/villages in Nagano	2011	14	2011–	–
Nara Club	2023	2	All cities/towns in Nara	2023	2	2023–	–
FC Osaka	2023	2	Higashiōsaka, Osaka	2023	2	2023–	–
Reilac Shiga	2026	0	Hikone, Shiga	2008	6	2026–	–
Renofa Yamaguchi	2015	1	Yamaguchi, Yamaguchi	2015	1	2026–	2016–2025
Roasso Kumamoto	2008 (J2)	3	Kumamoto, Kumamoto	2001	7	2026–	2022–2025
FC Ryukyu	2014	6	All cities/towns in Okinawa	2006	14	2023–	2019–2022
SC Sagamihara	2014	8	Sagamihara, Kanagawa	2013	10	2022–	2021
Thespa Gunma	2005 (J2)	2	Maebashi, Gunma	2004	3	2025–	2020–2024
Tochigi SC	2009 (J2)	2	Utsunomiya, Tochigi	2000	11	2025–	2018–2024
Zweigen Kanazawa	2014	2	Kanazawa	2015	2	2024–	2015–2023

- Pink background indicates clubs most recently promoted from JFL
- Gray background indicates the club most recently relegated from J2
- "Year joined" is the year the club joined the J. League (J3 League unless otherwise indicated).
- "First season in D3," "Seasons in D3," and "Current spell in D3" include seasons in JFL

=== Stadiums (2026–27) ===
Primary venues used in the J3 League:

Roasso Kumamoto	FC Osaka	Tochigi SC	Kamatamare Sanuki	Ehime FC
Egao Kenko Stadium	Hanazono Rugby Stadium	Kanseki Stadium Tochigi	Pikara Stadium	Ningineer Stadium
Capacity: 30,275	Capacity: 26,443	Capacity: 24,670	Capacity: 22,338	Capacity: 20,919
Matsumoto Yamaga	FC Gifu	Kochi United	Nagano Parceiro	Giravanz Kitakyushu
Sunpro Alwin	Gifu Nagaragawa Stadium	Kochi Haruno Athletic Stadium	Minami Nagano Sports Park Stadium	Mikuni World Stadium Kitakyushu
Capacity: 20,110	Capacity: 16,310	Capacity: 16,010	Capacity: 15,515	Capacity: 15,300
Thespa Gunma	Renofa Yamaguchi	Kagoshima United	Gainare Tottori	Zweigen Kanazawa
Shoda Shoyu Stadium Gunma	Ishin Me-Life Stadium	Shiranami Stadium	Axis Bird Stadium	Kanazawa Go Go Curry Stadium
Capacity: 15,190	Capacity: 15,115	Capacity: 12,212	Capacity: 11,999	Capacity: 10,728
Ryukyu Okinawa	Reilac Shiga	SC Sagamihara	Fukushima United	Nara Club
Tapic Kenso Hiyagon Stadium	Heiwado HATO Stadium	Sagamihara Gion Stadium	Toho Stadium	Rohto Field Nara
Capacity: 10,189	Capacity: 6,444	Capacity: 6,259	Capacity: 5,710	Capacity: 5,369

== Former clubs ==
Club name	Year joined	Seasons in J3	Based in	First season in D3	Seasons in D3	Last spell in D3	Current league
Azul Claro Numazu	2017	8	Numazu, Shizuoka	2017	8	2017–2025	JFL
Blaublitz Akita	2014	7	All cities/towns in Akita	2007	14	2007–2020	J2
Cerezo Osaka U-23	2016	5	Osaka & Sakai, Osaka	2016	5	2016–2020	defunct
Fujieda MYFC	2014	9	Central cities/towns in Shizuoka	2012	15	2012–2022	J2
Gamba Osaka U-23	2016	5	Northern cities in Osaka	2016	5	2016–2020	defunct
FC Imabari	2019	6	Imabari, Ehime	2019	6	2019–2024	J2
Iwaki FC	2022	1	Iwaki and Futaba District, Fukushima	2022	1	2022	J2
Iwate Grulla Morioka	2014	11	Morioka, Iwate	2014	11	2023–2024	JFL
J.League U-22 Selection	2014	2	Played away games only	2014	2	2015	defunct
Kataller Toyama	2009 (J2)	10	Toyama, Toyama	2008	11	2015–2024	J2
Machida Zelvia	2012 (J2)	2	Machida, Tokyo	2009	6	2015	J1
Oita Trinita	1999 (J2)	1	All cities/towns in Ōita	2016	1	2016	J2
Omiya Ardija	2006	1	Omiya, Saitama	1992	3	2024	J2
Tegevajaro Miyazaki	2021	5	Miyazaki, Miyazaki	2021	5	2021–2025	J2
Tochigi City FC	2025	1	Tochigi, Tochigi	2010	4	2025	J2
FC Tokyo U-23	2016	4	Chōfu, Tokyo	2016	4	2016–2019	defunct
Vanraure Hachinohe	2019	6	Hachinohe, Aomori	2019	6	2019–2025	J2
YSCC Yokohama	2014	12	Yokohama, Kanagawa	2012	14	2014–2024	JFL

- Pink background indicates clubs most recently promoted to J2
- Gray background indicates clubs most recently relegated to JFL
- "Year joined" is the year the club joined the J. League (J3 League unless otherwise indicated).
- "First season in D3," "Seasons in D3," and "Current spell in D3" include seasons in JFL

== Championship and promotion history ==
From 2014 to 2016, the playoff winners faced off against the 21st place in J2. From 2017 to 2023, two clubs were promoted by default. From 2024 onwards, the third promotion place is determined by a playoff between the 3rd to 6th actual places.

Season	Champions	Runners-up	Third place	Play-off winners
2014	**Zweigen Kanazawa**	Nagano Parceiro^{†}	Machida Zelvia	N/A
2015	**Renofa Yamaguchi**	**Machida Zelvia**^{‡}	Nagano Parceiro	N/A
2016	**Oita Trinita**	Tochigi SC	Nagano Parceiro	N/A
2017	Blaublitz Akita	**Tochigi SC**	Azul Claro Numazu	N/A
2018	**FC Ryukyu**	**Kagoshima United**	Gainare Tottori	N/A
2019	**Giravanz Kitakyushu**	**Thespakusatsu Gunma**	Fujieda MYFC	N/A
2020	**Blaublitz Akita**	**SC Sagamihara**	Nagano Parceiro	N/A
2021	**Roasso Kumamoto**	**Iwate Grulla Morioka**	Tegevajaro Miyazaki	N/A
2022	**Iwaki FC**	**Fujieda MYFC**	Kagoshima United	N/A
2023	**Ehime FC**	**Kagoshima United**	Kataller Toyama	N/A
2024	**Omiya Ardija**	**FC Imabari**	**Kataller Toyama**‡	
2025	**Tochigi City**	**Vanraure Hachinohe**	FC Osaka	**Tegevajaro Miyazaki** (4th)
2026–27				N/A

* Bold designates the promoted club;
† Lost the J2–J3 playoffs;
‡ Won the J2–J3 playoffs and got promoted;

=== Most successful clubs ===
Clubs in bold compete in J3 as of 2025 season.

Club	Winners	Runners-up	Promotions	Winning seasons	Runners-up seasons	Promotion seasons
Blaublitz Akita	2	0	1	2017, 2020		2020
**Zweigen Kanazawa**	1	0	1	2014		2014
Renofa Yamaguchi	1	0	1	2015		2015
Ōita Trinita	1	0	1	2016		2016
**FC Ryukyu**	1	0	1	2018		2018
**Giravanz Kitakyushu**	1	0	1	2019		2019
Roasso Kumamoto	1	0	1	2021		2021
Iwaki FC	1	0	1	2022		2022
Ehime FC	1	0	1	2023		2023
Omiya Ardija	1	0	1	2024		2024
**Tochigi City**	1	0	1	2025		2025
**Kagoshima United**	0	2	2		2018, 2023	2018, 2023
**Tochigi SC**	0	2	1		2016, 2017	2017
FC Imabari	0	1	1		2024	2024
Fujieda MYFC	0	1	1		2022	2022
Iwate Grulla Morioka	0	1	1		2021	2021
**SC Sagamihara**	0	1	1		2020	2020
**Thespa Gunma**	0	1	1		2019	2019
Machida Zelvia	0	1	1		2015	2015
**Vanraure Hachinohe**	0	1	1		2025	2025
**Nagano Parceiro**	0	1	0		2014	
**Tegevajaro Miyazaki**	0	0	1			2025

== Relegation history ==
From 2023, relegation from J3 to JFL was introduced, after nine seasons of not featuring it.

Year	19th place	20th place
2023	Tegevajaro Miyazaki	Giravanz Kitakyushu
2024	YSCC Yokohama‡	Iwate Grulla Morioka
2025	Nagano Parceiro	Azul Claro Numazu‡
2026–27		

* Bold designates relegated clubs
^{†} Won the playoff against JFL team
^{‡} Lost the playoff series to JFL team and was relegated

== Players and managers ==
=== Managers ===
- List of J.League managers

=== Top scorers ===
Year	Player	Nationality	Squad	Goals
2014	Koji Suzuki	Japan	Machida Zelvia	19
2015	Kazuhito Kishida	Japan	Renofa Yamaguchi	32
2016	Noriaki Fujimoto	Japan	Kagoshima United	15
2017	Noriaki Fujimoto	Japan	Kagoshima United	24
2018	Leonardo (de Souza)	Brazil	Gainare Tottori	24
2019	Taichi Hara	Japan	FC Tokyo U-23	19
2020	Kaito Taniguchi	Japan	Roasso Kumamoto	18
2021	Shota Kawanishi	Japan	FC Gifu	13
2022	Ryo Arita	Japan	Iwaki FC	17
2023	Ren Komatsu	Japan	Matsumoto Yamaga	19
2024	Kosuke Fujioka	Japan	FC Gifu	19
2025	Keigo Hashimoto	Japan	Tegevajaro Miyazaki	25
2026–27		Japan		

== See also ==
- Sport in Japan
  - Football in Japan
    - Women's football in Japan
- Japan Football Association (JFA)

Soccer/football
League system

- Japanese association football league system
- J.League
  - J1 League (Tier 1)
  - J2 League (Tier 2)
- Japan Football League (JFL) (Tier 4)
- Regional Champions League (Promotion playoffs to JFL)
- Regional Leagues (Tier 5/6)

Domestic cup

- Fujifilm Super Cup (Super Cup)
- Emperor's Cup (National Cup)
- J.League YBC Levain Cup (League Cup)

Futsal

- F.League
  - F1 League (Tier 1)
  - F2 League (Tier 2)
- JFA Futsal Championship (National Cup)
- F.League Ocean Cup (League Cup)

Beach soccer

- Beach Soccer Championship (National Cup)
