= Kōshirō =

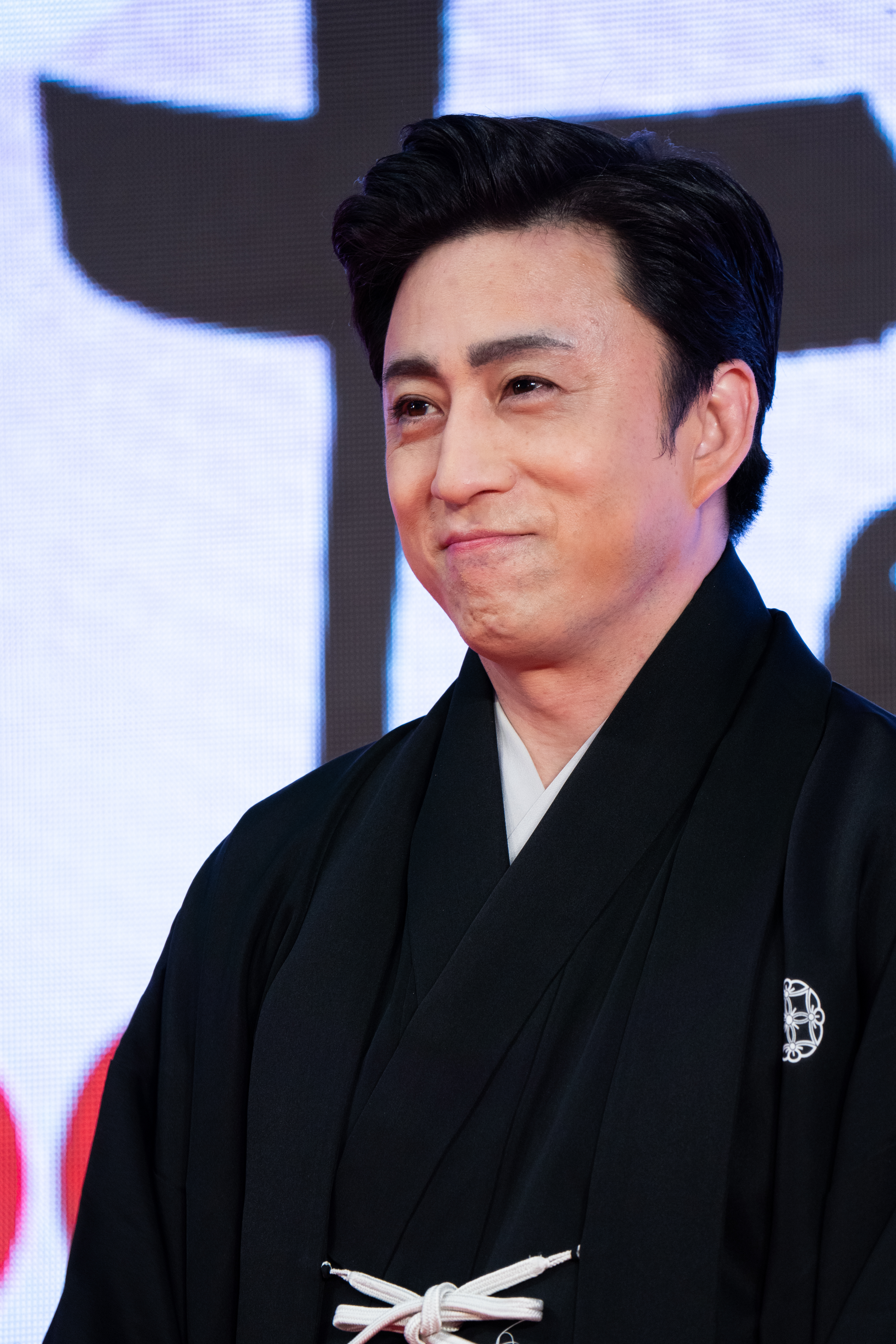
- Koshiro Matsumoto X, kabuki actor
- Gender: Male

Origin
- Origin: Japanese
- Meaning: Different meanings depending on the kanji used

Kōshirō, Koshiro or Koushirou (written: 幸四郎, 孝四郎, 高志郎, 庚子郎, 好志郎 or 公志郎) is a masculine Japanese given name. Notable people with the name include:

- Koshiro Itohara (糸原 紘史郎; born 1998), Japanese footballer
- Kōshirō Ishida (石田 幸四郎; 1930–2006), Japanese politician
- Matsumoto Kōshirō (松本 幸四郎), various kabuki actors
  - Matsumoto Kōshirō X (十代目 松本幸四郎), Japanese actor and kabuki actor
  - Matsumoto Kōshirō VII (七代目 松本 幸四郎), Japanese actor
- Kōshirō Onchi (恩地 孝四郎; 1891–1955), Japanese print maker and photographer
- Koshiro Sakamoto (坂本 光士郎; born 1994), Japanese baseball player
- Koshiro Shimada (島田 高志郎; born 2001), Japanese figure skater
- Koshiro Sugita (杉田 好志郎), Japanese Paralympic swimmer
- Koshiro Sumi (角 昂志郎; born 2002), Japanese footballer
- Koshiro Take (武 幸四郎; born 1978), Japanese horse trainer and retired jockey
- Koshiro Ueki (植木 庚子郎; 1900–1980), Japanese politician
- Koshiro Yamamuro (山室 公志郎; born 1987), Japanese baseball player
- Yuzo Koshiro (古代 祐三; born 1967), Japanese president of the company Ancient

Fictional characters:

- Koushiro Izumi (泉 光子郎) (Izzy Izumi in English dub), a fictional character from Digimon Adventure.
- Koushiro Sasaki (佐々木 古志郎), a fictional character from Machine Robo Rescue.
- Chikuma Koshirou (筑摩 小四郎), a fictional character from The Kouga Ninja Scrolls
- Shimotsuki Koushirou (霜月コウシロウ), a fictional character from One Piece

Koshirō or Koshirou (written: 古志郎) is a separate given name, though it may be romanized the same way:

- Koshirō Oikawa (及川 古志郎) (1883–1958), Imperial Japanese Navy admiral
