= 2023 Blaublitz Akita season =

Blaublitz Akita
2023 season
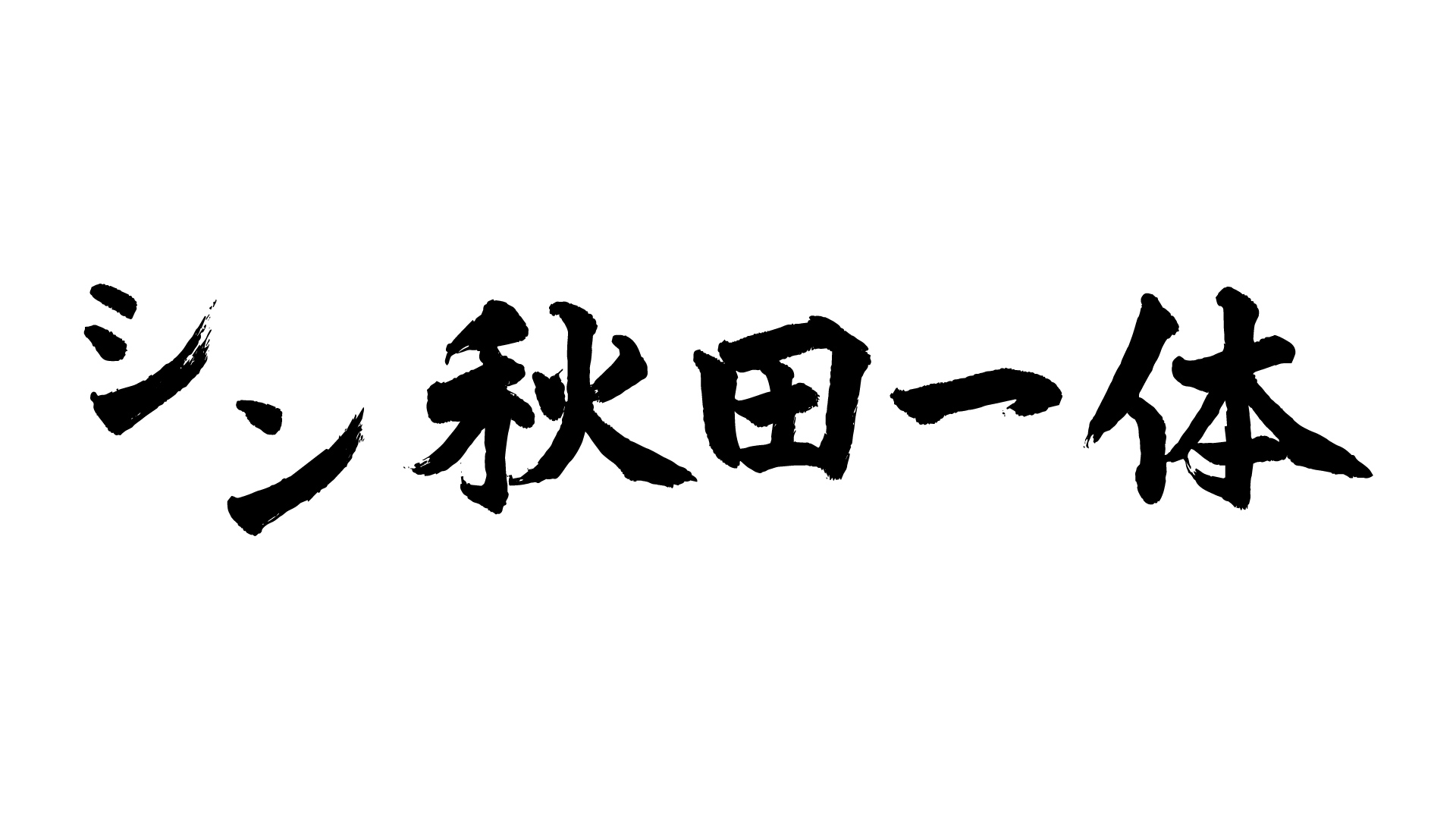
- Chairman: Kosuke Iwase
- Manager: Ken Yoshida
- Stadium: Soyu Stadium
- J2 League: 13th
- Emperor's Cup: Second round
- Top goalscorer: Keita Saito (5)
- Highest home attendance: 5,193
- Lowest home attendance: 1,603
- Average home league attendance: 3,139
Home colours	Away colours

The 2023 season was Blaublitz Akita' s third season in the J2 League, and the tenth as a J.League member. The annual club slogan is "Shin and Akita together" (シン・秋田一体).

== Squad ==
As of 2023 season.

Note: Flags indicate national team as defined under FIFA eligibility rules; some limited exceptions apply. Players may hold more than one non-FIFA nationality.

No.	Pos.	Nation	Player
1	GK	JPN	Genki Yamada
2	DF	JPN	Yuzuru Yoshimura
3	DF	JPN	Tatsushi Koyanagi
4	DF	JPN	Kaito Abe (on loan from Fagiano Okayama)
5	DF	JPN	Takashi Kawano
6	MF	JPN	Hiroto Morooka
7	MF	JPN	Takuma Mizutani
8	FW	JPN	Junki Hata
9	MF	JPN	Ryota Nakamura
10	MF	JPN	Masaki Okino
13	DF	JPN	Ryuji Saito
14	MF	JPN	Yosuke Mikami
15	FW	JPN	Shion Niwa (on loan from Zweigen Kanazawa)
16	MF	JPN	Naoki Inoue
17	FW	JPN	Yukihito Kajiya (on loan from Sagan Tosu)

No.	Pos.	Nation	Player
18	FW	JPN	Ibuki Yoshida
21	GK	JPN	Akihito Ozawa
22	DF	JPN	Ryota Takada
23	MF	JPN	Hiroto Tanaka
24	MF	JPN	Daiki Kogure
25	MF	JPN	Tomofumi Fujiyama
27	DF	JPN	Yuto Fujita
29	FW	JPN	Keita Saito
30	GK	JPN	Yuki Yasuda
31	GK	JPN	Kentaro Kakoi
33	MF	JPN	Ryutaro Iio (captain)
39	DF	JPN	Kyowaan Hoshi
40	FW	JPN	Shota Aoki
42	FW	JPN	Ken Tshizanga Matsumoto ^{DSP}
44	MF	JPN	Mouhamadou War
45	MF	JPN	Hinase Suzuki
50	DF	JPN	Kenichi Kaga

=== Out on loan ===
Note: Flags indicate national team as defined under FIFA eligibility rules; some limited exceptions apply. Players may hold more than one non-FIFA nationality.

No.	Pos.	Nation	Player
—	DF	JPN	Shintaro Kato (at Vanraure Hachinohe)
—	FW	JPN	Hayate Take (at Thespakusatsu Gunma)
—	FW	JPN	Koya Handa (at Verspah Oita)

== J2 League ==
In the 2023 season of the J2, Blaublitz will play 42 home-and-away matches.

Match	Date	Team	Score	Team	Venue	Attendance
1	2023.02.18	Thespakusatsu Gunma	0–0	Blaublitz Akita	Shoda Shoyu Stadium	3,374
2	2023.02.26	Roasso Kumamoto	0–1	Blaublitz Akita	Egao Kenko Stadium	4,994
3	2023.03.04	Fujieda MYFC	0–1	Blaublitz Akita	Fujieda Soccer Stadium	2,020
4	2023.03.12	Blaublitz Akita	1–0	JEF United Chiba	Soyu Stadium	3,838
5	2023.03.19	Blaublitz Akita	1–1	Mito HollyHock	Soyu Stadium	2,955
6	2023.03.25	Tokushima Vortis	0–0	Blaublitz Akita	Pocarisweat Stadium	4,582
7	2023.04.01	Blaublitz Akita	0–1	Renofa Yamaguchi	Soyu Stadium	2,506
8	2023.04.08	Machida Zelvia	0–1	Blaublitz Akita	Machida GION Stadium	3,219
9	2023.04.12	Tokyo Verdy	2–1	Blaublitz Akita	Ajinomoto Stadium	2,805
10	2023.04.16	Blaublitz Akita	2–1	Omiya Ardija	Soyu Stadium	2,203
11	2023.04.22	V-Varen Nagasaki	4–2	Blaublitz Akita	Transcosmos Stadium Nagasaki	5,500
12	2023.04.29	Blaublitz Akita	0–1	Fagiano Okayama	Soyu Stadium	2,483
13	2023.05.03	Vegalta Sendai	2–2	Blaublitz Akita	Yurtec Stadium Sendai	15,026
14	2023.05.07	Blaublitz Akita	2–1	Tochigi SC	Soyu Stadium	3,455
15	2023.05.14	Iwaki FC	0–1	Blaublitz Akita	Iwaki Greenfield Stadium	2,458
16	2023.05.17	Blaublitz Akita	0–1	Ventforet Kofu	Soyu Stadium	2,504
17	2023.05.21	Montedio Yamagata	2–1	Blaublitz Akita	ND Soft Stadium Yamagata	8,476
18	2023.05.28	Blaublitz Akita	0–0	Oita Trinita	Soyu Stadium	1,603
19	2023.06.03	Júbilo Iwata	2–0	Blaublitz Akita	Yamaha Stadium	7,709
20	2023.06.11	Blaublitz Akita	0–0	Zweigen Kanazawa	Soyu Stadium	3,954
22	2023.06.24	Blaublitz Akita	1–3	Fujieda MYFC	Soyu Stadium	3,688
21	2023.06.28	Shimizu S-Pulse	0–1	Blaublitz Akita	IAI Stadium Nihondaira	6,231
23	2023.07.02	Blaublitz Akita	1–1	Iwaki FC	Soyu Stadium	2,181
24	2023.07.05	Ventforet Kofu	5–1	Blaublitz Akita	JIT Recycle Ink Stadium	4,541
25	2023.07.09	Blaublitz Akita	1–1	Roasso Kumamoto	Soyu Stadium	2,104
27	2023.07.22	Renofa Yamaguchi	1–2	Blaublitz Akita	Ishin Me-Life Stadium	4,273
28	2023.07.29	Blaublitz Akita	0–0	Thespakusatsu Gunma	Soyu Stadium	2,456
29	2023.08.06	Omiya Ardija	1–0	Blaublitz Akita	NACK5 Stadium	6,818
30	2023.08.13	Blaublitz Akita	0–1	Tokyo Verdy	Soyu Stadium	3,071
31	2023.08.19	Mito Hollyhock	1–1	Blaublitz Akita	K's denki Stadium	3,410
32	2023.08.27	Blaublitz Akita	1–1	Shimizu S-Pulse	Soyu Stadium	4,803
33	2023.09.02	Blaublitz Akita	1–1	Jubilo Iwata	Soyu Stadium	4,154
34	2023.09.19	JEF United	2–1	Blaublitz Akita	Fukuda Denshi Arena	7,474
35	2023.09.16	Blaublitz Akita	0–0	V-Varen Nagasaki	Soyu Stadium	2,204
36	2023.09.23	Blaublitz Akita	1–1	Montedio Yamagata	Soyu Stadium	5,193
37	2023.10.01	Tochigi SC	1–2	Blaublitz Akita	Tochigi Green Stadium	4,144
38	2023.10.08	Zweigen Kanazawa	0–2	Blaublitz Akita	Ishikawa Athletics Stadium	3,310
26	2023.10.14	Blaublitz Akita	1–2	Machida Zelvia	Soyu Stadium	3,004
39	2023.10.22	Blaublitz Akita	0–1	Vegalta Sendai	Soyu Stadium	4,178
40	2023.10.29	Oita Trinita	2–1	Blaublitz Akita	Resonac Dome Oita	9,033

== Emperor's Cup ==
As a J2 League member, the club earns a direct entry to the second round of the competition, not needing to participate in the prefectural qualifications for the competition.

7 June Match 50	Blaublitz Akita (2)	1–2	(2) Tochigi SC	Akita
19:00 JST	Yoshida 69'	Report; Report	Oshima 19'; Nemoto 84'	Stadium: Soyu Stadium; Attendance: 674; Referee: Yoshiro Imamura

== Friendlies ==
1 February 2023	Blaublitz Akita	2–1	Albirex Niigata	Kochi, Kochi
10:00	R. Saito; Hata	Report; Report	Suzuki	Stadium: Kochi Haruno Athletic Stadium

19 February 2023	Blaublitz Akita	3–1	FC Tokushima	Kochi, Kochi
	R. Saito; Tanaka; Kajiya	Report		Stadium: Kochi Youth Center

13 March 2023	Vegalta Sendai	2–4	Blaublitz Akita	Sendai, Miyagi
13:00	Kida ?	Report; Report	Niwa; Kajiya; Yoshida	Stadium: Iris Training Field

12 May 2023	Blaublitz Akita	–	North Asia University	Katagami, Akita
		Report		Stadium: Katagami Soccer Ground

22 May 2023	Blaublitz Akita	2–2	ReinMeer Aomori	Nikaho, Akita
12:00	Inoue; War	Report; Report; Report	Hashimura; Inaba	Stadium: TDK Akita General Sports Center

17 June 2023	Blaublitz Akita	7–2	Sendai University	Katagami, Akita
11:00	Aoki; Saito; Kawano; Nakamura; War; Mikami	Report; Report	Tamaki; Fukuda	Stadium: Katagami Soccer Ground

30 July 2023	Blaublitz Akita	3–1	Sendai University	Akita, Akita
15:30	Kogure; Mikami; Koyanagi	Report; Report	Sasaki	Stadium: Soyu Stadium

20 August 2023	Blaublitz Akita	0–4	Niigata University of Health and Welfare	Nikaho, Akita
15:30		Report; Report	Akimoto; Yoshida; Sakagishi; Uenohara	Stadium: TDK Akita General Sports Center

3 September 2023	Blaublitz Akita	3–0	Iwate Grulla Morioka	Katagami, Akita
11:00	Kajiya; Own goal R. Saito	Report; Report		Stadium: Katagami Soccer Ground

2 October 2023	Blaublitz Akita	1–2	ReinMeer Aomori	Katagami, Akita
11:00	War	Report; Report	Saito; Shigeta	Stadium: Katagami Soccer Ground

15 October 2023	Blaublitz Akita	1–2	Fuji University	Katagami, Akita
11:00	Niwa	Report [Report]	Goal	Stadium: Katagami Soccer Ground

23 October 2023	Blaublitz Akita	1–2	Japan Soccer College	Katagami, Akita
12:00	Abe	Report [Report]	Goal	Stadium: Katagami Soccer Ground

== Gallery ==
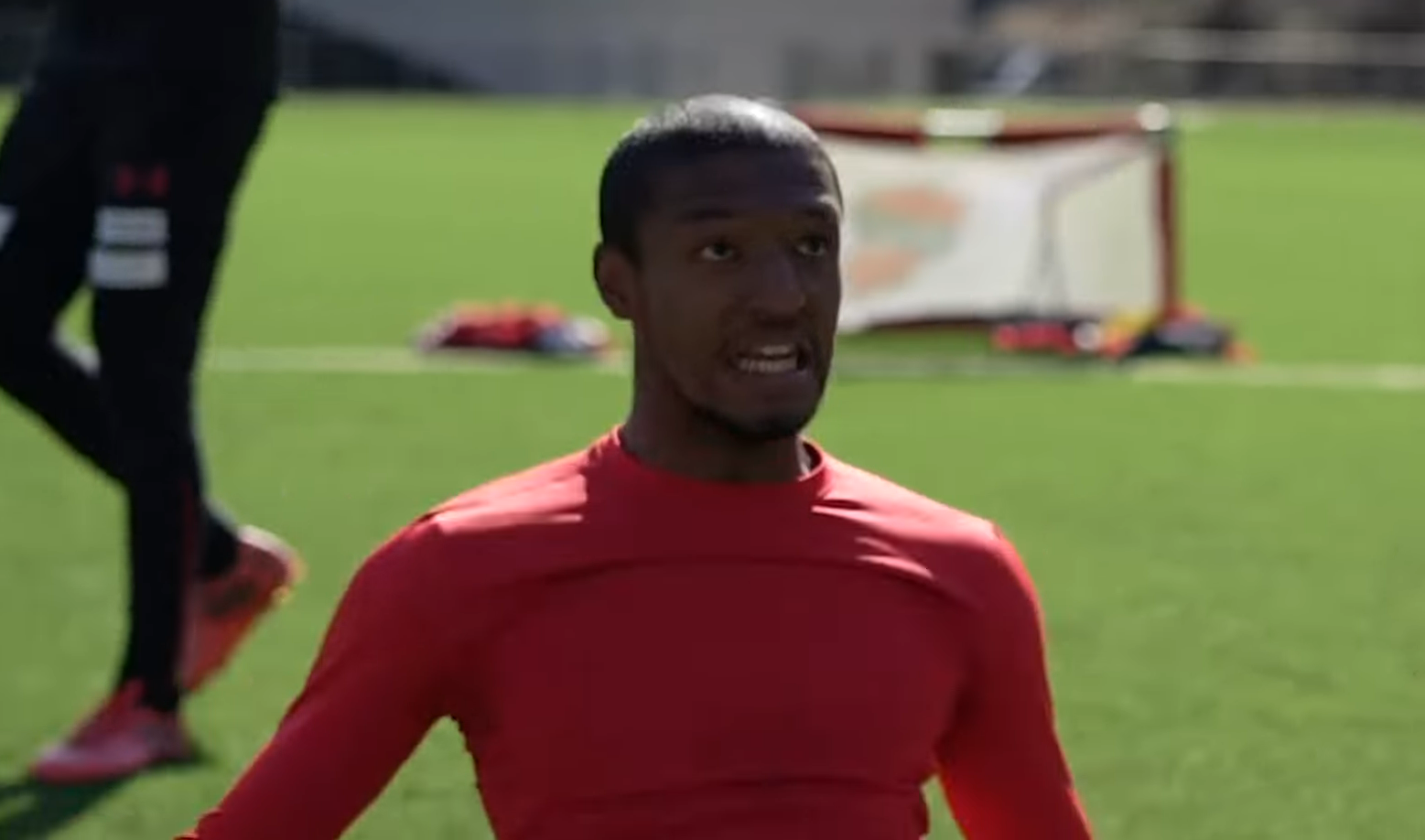
Kyowaan Hoshi

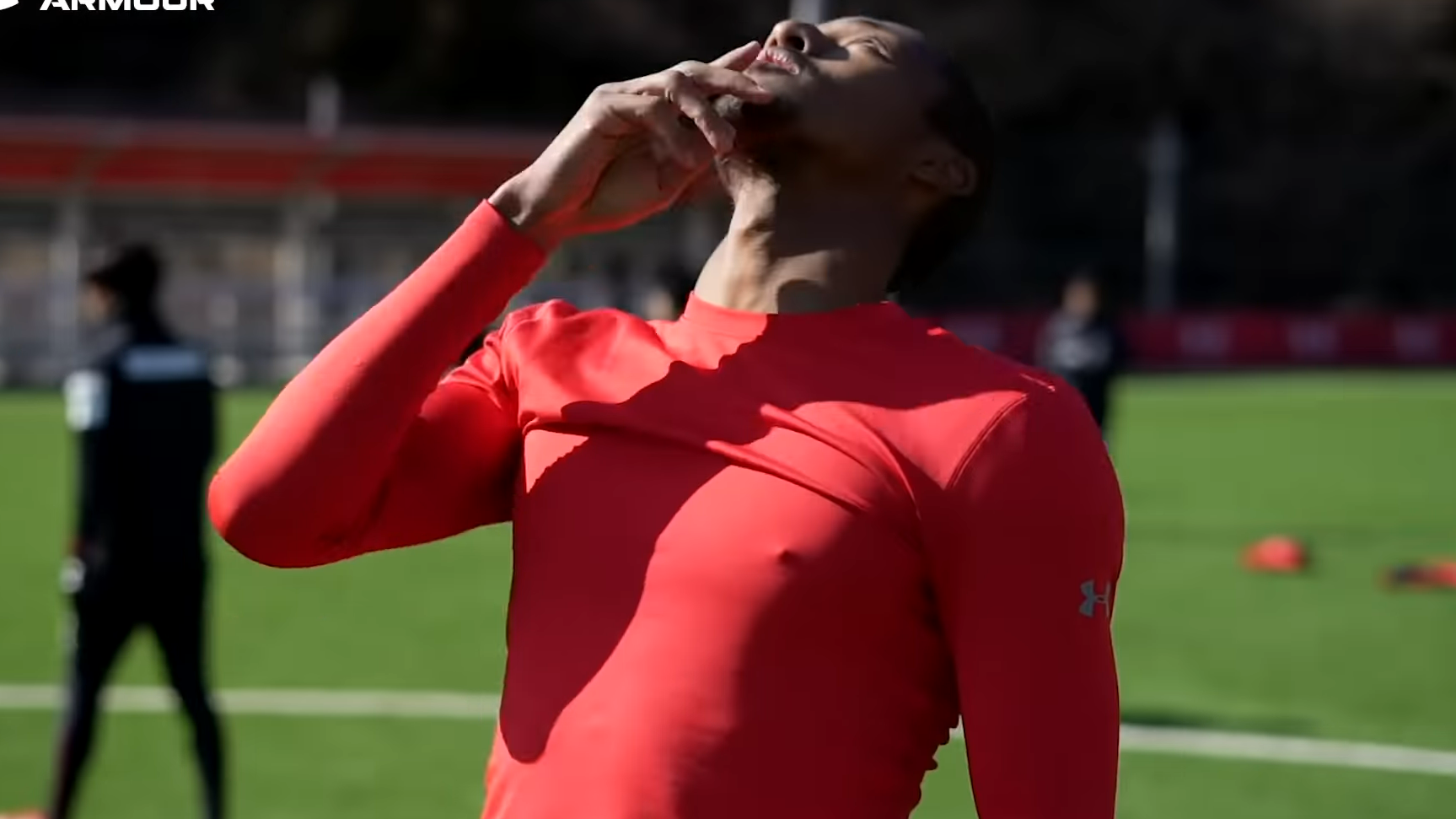
Kyowaan Hoshi
