= Bùi Ngọc Long =

Vietnamese footballer (born 2001)

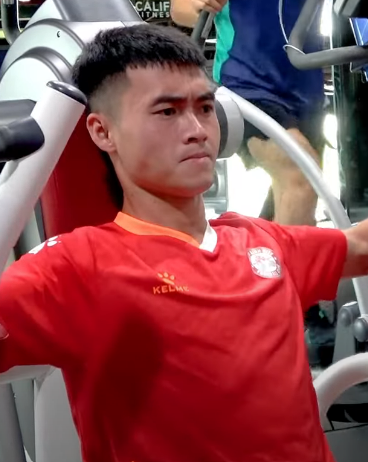
- Bùi Ngọc Long in 2023

Personal information
- Full name: Bùi Ngọc Long
- Date of birth: 6 October 2001 (age 25)
- Place of birth: Phú Xuyên, Hanoi, Vietnam
- Height: 1.63 m (5 ft 4 in)
- Position: Winger

Team information
- Current team: Hà Nội
- Number: 18

Youth career
- 2015–2017: Viettel
- 2018–2019: Than Quảng Ninh

Senior career*
Years	Team	Apps	(Gls)
2019–2021	Than Quảng Ninh	4	(0)
2019	→ Luxury Hạ Long (loan)		
2020	→ PVF (loan)		
2021–2022	Sài Gòn	0	(0)
2022	→ Azul Claro Numazu (loan)	2	(0)
2022	→ Hồng Lĩnh Hà Tĩnh (loan)	0	(0)
2023–2026	Công An Hồ Chí Minh City	49	(4)
2024	→ Công An Hà Nội (loan)	5	(0)
2026–	Hà Nội	0	(0)

International career^{‡}
2024	Vietnam U23	2	(0)
- * Club domestic league appearances and goals as of 7 June 2026 ‡ National team caps and goals as of 20 March 2024

Bùi Ngọc Long (born 6 October 2001) is a Vietnamese professional footballer who plays as a winger for V.League 1 club Hà Nội.

== Career ==
Bui Ngoc Long was in the academy at Viettel, before joining Than Quang Ninh in 2020. He made his first-team debut on 18 March 2021 in a 1–0 defeat to Song Lam Nghe An. After Than Quang Ninh were dissolved at the end of the 2021 season, he joined Saigon FC.

On 24 January 2022, Long joined J3 League club Azul Claro Numazu on loan for a season with his Saigon FC teammate Nguyen Van Son.

After Ngọc Long came back from his loan from Azul Claro Numazu, Sài Gòn dissolved, making him a free agent. In March 2023, he signed for V.League 1 club Hồ Chí Minh City. On 28 February 2024, Ngọc Long signed a new contract extension that will last until the end of the 2025–26 season.

== Career statistics ==
As of match played 9 March 2024

Club	Season	League			Cup		Continental		Other		Total	
Club	Season	Division	Apps	Goals	Apps	Goals	Apps	Goals	Apps	Goals	Apps	Goals
Than Quảng Ninh	2021	V.League 1	4	0	0	0	—		0	0	4	0
Sài Gòn	2022	V.League 1	0	0	0	0	—		0	0	0	0
Azul Claro Numazu (loan)	2022	J3 League	2	0	0	0	—		0	0	2	0
Hồ Chí Minh City	2023	V.League 1	5	0	0	0	—		—		5	0
Hồ Chí Minh City	2023–24	V.League 1	13	1	1	0	—		—		14	1
Hồ Chí Minh City	Total		18	1	1	0	0	0	0	0	19	1
Career total			24	1	1	0	0	0	0	0	25	1

== Honours ==
Công An Hồ Chí Minh City

- Vietnamese National Cup: 2025–26
