= 2022 J3 League =

9th season of the Japanese J3 League

Meiji Yasuda J3 League
- Season: 2022
- Dates: 12 March – 20 November
- Champions: Iwaki FC (1st title)
- Promoted: Iwaki FC; Fujieda MYFC
- Relegated: No relegation
- Matches: 306
- Goals: 797 (2.6 per match)
- Top goalscorer: Ryo Arita (17 goals)
- Biggest home win: Gainare Tottori 6–0 Kagoshima United (24 September)
- Biggest away win: YSCC Yokohama 0–6 Iwaki FC (4 June); Fukushima United 0–6 Fujieda MYFC (5 June)
- Highest scoring: Ehime FC 7–2 Gainare Tottori (14 August)
- Longest winning run: Fujieda MYFC; Kataller Toyama (6 matches)
- Longest unbeaten run: Iwaki FC; Fujieda MYFC; FC Imabari (10 matches)
- Longest winless run: Kamatamare Sanuki (14 matches)
- Longest losing run: YSCC Yokohama; Tegevajaro Miyazaki (7 matches)
- Highest attendance: 15,912; Matsumoto Yamaga 2–1 Nagano Parceiro (30 October)
- Lowest attendance: 458; Vanraure Hachinohe 2–1 SC Sagamihara (15 June)
- Total attendance: 833,042
- Average attendance: 2,722

The 2022 J3 League, referred to as the 2022 Meiji Yasuda J3 League (Japanese: 2022 明治安田生命J3リーグ, Hepburn: 2022 Meiji Yasuda Seimei J3 Rīgu) for sponsorship reasons, was the 9th season of J3 League under its current name.

Iwaki FC won the J3 title for the first time in their history, in their debut campaign at the J3 League, just a year after being promoted from the JFL. They were promoted to the 2023 J2 League alongside Fujieda MYFC, who narrowly promoted with one point off the 3rd-placed team. Both teams won promotion for the J2 League for the first time.

== Overview ==
After no relegations from the J2 League in 2020, in 2021 there were four relegations and the number of teams in the 2022 J3 League increased from 15 to 18.

This is first and last season as 18 teams for 2022.

This is last season to not feature relegation in 2022. From 2023, relegation from the J3 League to the JFL will be made possible.

== Changes from the previous season ==
Promoted from 2021 JFL	Promoted to 2022 J2 League	Relegated from 2021 J2 League
Iwaki FC	Roasso Kumamoto; Iwate Grulla Morioka	SC Sagamihara; Ehime FC; Giravanz Kitakyushu; Matsumoto Yamaga

The 4 teams relegated from J2 League in 2021 were: SC Sagamihara, Ehime FC, Giravanz Kitakyushu and Matsumoto Yamaga.

Roasso Kumamoto and Iwate Grulla Morioka were promoted to J2 League.

Iwaki FC was promoted from 2021 JFL as champions of that division. Fukushima team are making their debut in the J3 League after obtaining a J.League License, to enable their promotion from the JFL.

== Participating clubs ==
Locations of the 2022 J3 League teams

Club name	Home town	Stadium	Capacity	Last season	Licence
Azul Claro Numazu	Numazu	Ashitaka Stadium	5,104	J3 (14th)	J3
Ehime FC	All cities/towns in Ehime (Note: centering on Matsuyama)	Ningineer Stadium	21,401	J2 (20th) Relegated	J1
Fujieda MYFC	Cities/towns in Shizuoka Prefecture (Note: Fujieda, Shimada, Yaizu, Makinohara, Yoshida, Kawanehonmachi)	Fujieda Soccer Field	13,000	J3 (10th)	J2
Fukushima United	Fukushima	Toho Stadium	21,000	J3 (5th)	J1
Gainare Tottori	All cities/towns in Tottori (Note: centering on Tottori, Yonago, Kurayoshi, Sakaiminato)	Axis Bird Stadium	16,033	J3 (12th)	J2
FC Gifu	All cities/towns in Gifu (Note: centering on Gifu)	Gifu Nagaragawa Stadium	26,109	J3 (6th)	J1
Giravanz Kitakyushu	Kitakyushu, Fukuoka	Mikuni World Stadium Kitakyushu	15,066	J2 (21st) Relegated	J1
FC Imabari	Imabari	Arigato Service Dream Stadium	5,241	J3 (11th)	J2
Iwaki FC	Iwaki and Futaba District, Fukushima	Arigato Service Dream Stadium	5,000	Promoted from JFL (champions)	J2
Kagoshima United	Kagoshima	Shiranami Stadium	19,934	J3 (7th)	J1
Kamatamare Sanuki	All cities/towns in Kagawa (Note: centering on Takamatsu, Marugame)	Pikara Stadium	30,099	J3 (15th)	J2
Kataller Toyama	All cities/towns in Toyama (Note: centering on Toyama)	Toyama Athletic Stadium	28,494	J3 (5th)	J1
Matsumoto Yamaga	Cities/towns in Nagano (Note: Matsumoto, Azumino, Yamagata, Shiojiri, Omachi, Ikeda, Ikusaka, Minowa, Asahi)	Sunpro Alwin	20,396	J2 (22nd) Relegated	J1
Nagano Parceiro	Nagano	Nagano U Stadium	15,491	J3 (9th)	J2
SC Sagamihara	Sagamihara	Gion Stadium	15,300	J2 (19th) Relegated	J2
Tegevajaro Miyazaki	Miyazaki & Shintomi, Miyazaki	Unilever Stadium Shintomi	5,357	J3 (3rd)	J3
Vanraure Hachinohe	Eastern cities/towns in Aomori (Note: Hachinohe, Towada, Gonohe, Sannohe, Takko, Hashikami, Nanbu, Shingo, Oirase, Misawa, Shichinohe, Rokunohe, Tohoku, Noheji, Yokohama, Rokkasho)	Prifoods Stadium	5,200	J3 (13th)	J2
YSCC Yokohama	Yokohama	Nippatsu Mitsuzawa Stadium	15,454	J3 (8th)	J2

=== Personnel and kits ===
Club	Manager	Captain	Kit manufacturer
Azul Claro Numazu	(Japan) Kazuhito Mochizuki (caretaker)	(Japan) Takuya Sugai	(Brazil) Penalty
Ehime FC	(Japan) Kiyotaka Ishimaru	(Japan) Takanori Maeno	(Japan) Mizuno
Fujieda MYFC	(Japan) Daisuke Sudo	(Japan) Masahiko Sugita	(Japan) Gol.
Fukushima United	(Japan) Toshihiro Hattori	(Japan) Hiroto Morooka	(Denmark) Hummel
Gainare Tottori	(North Korea) Kim Jong-song	(Japan) Koki Ishii	(Japan) Soccer Junky
FC Gifu	(Japan) Yuji Yokoyama	(Japan) Yōsuke Kashiwagi	(Japan) Razzoli
Giravanz Kitakyushu	(Japan) Kenichi Amano	(Japan) Taiga Maekawa	(Brazil) Penalty
FC Imabari	(Japan) Kazuaki Hashikawa	(Japan) Keishi Kusumi	(Japan) Asics
Iwaki FC	(Japan) Hiromasa Suguri	(Japan) Yuto Yamashita	(United States) Under Armour
Kagoshima United	(Japan) Naoto Otake	(Japan) Kenta Hirose	(Japan) Angua
Kamatamare Sanuki	(Japan) Toshihiro Nishimura	(Japan) Takaharu Nishino	(Japan) (Brazil) Athleta
Kataller Toyama	(Japan) Michiharu Otagiri	(Japan) Yohei Nishibe	(Japan) Goldwin
Matsumoto Yamaga	(Japan) Hiroshi Nanami	(Japan) Hayumu Tanaka	(Germany) Adidas
Nagano Parceiro	(Germany) Yuki Richard Stalph	(Japan) Takuma Mizutani	(Brazil) Penalty
SC Sagamihara	(Japan) Norihiro Satsukawa	(Japan) Hiroki Mizumoto	(Japan) Gol.
Tegevajaro Miyazaki	(Japan) Yasushi Takasaki	(Japan) Kenji Dai	(Japan) Yonex
Vanraure Hachinohe	(Japan) Ryo Shigaki	(Japan) Naoyuki Yamada	(Denmark) Hummel
YSCC Yokohama	(Japan) Kei Hoshikawa	(Japan) Kento Dodate	(Japan) Bonera

=== Managerial changes ===
Team	Outgoing	Manner	Exit date		Position	Incoming	Incoming date		Ref.
Team	Outgoing	Manner	Announced on	Departed on	Position	Incoming	Announced on	Arrived on	Ref.
FC Gifu	Toshiya Miura	Resigned	5 May 2022	5 May 2022	14th	Yuji Yokoyama	5 May 2022	6 May 2022	
SC Sagamihara	Takuya Takagi	Sacked	20 May 2022	20 May 2022	15th	Norihiro Satsukawa	23 May 2022	24 May 2022	
YSCC Yokohama	Kenji Nakada	Sacked	25 May 2022	25 May 2022	18th	Kei Hoshikawa	26 May 2022	26 May 2022	
Vanraure Hachinohe	Masahiro Kuzuno	Sacked	13 June 2022	13 June 2022	17th	Ryo Shigaki	13 June 2022	13 June 2022	
Azul Claro Numazu	Masataka Imai	Sacked	23 August 2022	23 August 2022	17th	Kazuhito Mochizuki	23 August 2022	23 August 2022	
Kataller Toyama	Nobuhiro Ishizaki	Sacked	19 September 2022	19 September 2022	5th	Michiharu Otagiri	19 September 2022	19 September 2022	

== Foreign players ==
From the 2021 season onwards, there is no limitations on signing foreign players, but clubs could only register up to five of them for a single matchday squad. Players from J.League partner nations (Thailand, Vietnam, Myanmar, Malaysia, Cambodia, Singapore, Indonesia, and Qatar) were exempted from these restrictions.

- Players name in **bold** indicates the player is registered during the midseason transfer window.
- Player's name in italics indicates the player has Japanese nationality in addition to their FIFA nationality, holds the nationality of a J.League partner nation, or is exempt from being treated as a foreign player due to having been born in Japan and being enrolled in, or having graduated from an approved type of school in the country.

Club	Player 1	Player 2	Player 3	Player 4	Player 5	Player 6
Azul Claro Numazu	(Malaysia) Hadi Fayyadh	(Vietnam) Bùi Ngọc Long	(Vietnam) Nguyễn Văn Sơn	(Vietnam) Nguyễn Ngọc Hậu		
Ehime FC						
Fujieda MYFC	(Brazil) Kauan	(Brazil) Pedro Henrique				
Fukushima United						
Gainare Tottori	(North Korea) Mun In-ju					
FC Gifu	(Brazil) Freire	(Brazil) Henik	(South Korea) Ono Cholhwan			
Giravanz Kitakyushu						
FC Imabari	(Brazil) Marcus Índio	(Australia) Mohamed Adam	(South Korea) Park Soo-bin	(South Korea) Lee Do-hyung	(Netherlands) Ralf Seuntjens	(Poland) **Filip Piszczek**
Iwaki FC						
Kagoshima United	(Brazil) Weslley	(Peru) Frank Romero				
Kamatamare Sanuki	(Kenya) Ismael Dunga					
Kataller Toyama	(Brazil) Arthur Silva	(Brazil) Gabriel Nascimento	(Brazil) Luís Henrique	(Brazil) Matheus Leiria	(China) **Chen Binbin**	
Matsumoto Yamaga	(Brazil) Lucão	(Brazil) Paulinho	(Spain) Víctor Ibáñez			
Nagano Parceiro	(Indonesia) Ryu Nugraha	(South Korea) Kim Min-ho				
SC Sagamihara	(Brazil) Eduardo Kunde	(Brazil) Agenor				
Tegevajaro Miyazaki						
Vanraure Hachinohe						
YSCC Yokohama	(Hong Kong) Au Yeung Yiu Chung	(North Korea) Han Yong-gi	(Chinese Taipei) Shunkun Tani	(Nigeria) Promise Ugochukwu	(Luxembourg) **Loris Tinelli**	

== League table ==
Pos	Team	Pld	W	D	L	GF	GA	GD	Pts	Promotion
1	Iwaki FC (C, P)	34	23	7	4	72	23	+49	76	Promotion to the J2 League (Note: Only teams that hold a J2 license are eligible for promotion.)
2	Fujieda MYFC (P)	34	20	7	7	58	29	+29	67	Promotion to the J2 League
3	Kagoshima United	34	21	3	10	55	39	+16	66	
4	Matsumoto Yamaga	34	20	6	8	46	33	+13	66	
5	FC Imabari	34	18	6	10	55	40	+15	60	
6	Kataller Toyama	34	19	3	12	55	48	+7	60	
7	Ehime FC	34	14	10	10	51	41	+10	52	
8	Nagano Parceiro	34	14	10	10	42	41	+1	52	
9	Tegevajaro Miyazaki (Note: The team hold neither a J1 nor J2 license, and so are ineligible for promotion to the J2 League.)	34	12	10	12	45	47	−2	46	
10	Vanraure Hachinohe	34	14	1	19	32	46	−14	43	
11	Fukushima United	34	11	9	14	37	45	−8	42	
12	Gainare Tottori	34	12	5	17	55	56	−1	41	
13	Giravanz Kitakyushu	34	11	7	16	41	45	−4	40	
14	FC Gifu	34	10	7	17	43	53	−10	37	
15	Azul Claro Numazu	34	8	7	19	27	46	−19	31	
16	YSCC Yokohama	34	8	4	22	25	66	−41	28	
17	Kamatamare Sanuki	34	6	9	19	27	49	−22	27	
18	SC Sagamihara	34	6	7	21	31	50	−19	25	

Source: Meiji Yasuda J3 League, J.League Data Site
Rules for classification: 1) Points; 2) Goal difference; 3) Head-to-head points; 4) Head-to-head goal difference; 5) Head-to-head goal scored; 6) Number of wins; 7) Goals scored; 8) Fair-play points
(C) Champions; (P) Promoted

== Stadiums ==
Primary venues used in the 2022 J3 League season:

Azul Claro Numazu	Ehime FC	Fujieda MYFC	Fukushima United	Gainare Tottori	FC Gifu
Ashitaka Park Stadium	Ningineer Stadium	Fujieda Soccer Stadium	Toho Stadium	Axis Bird Stadium	Gifu Nagaragawa Stadium
Capacity: 5,104	Capacity: 21,401	Capacity: 5,056	Capacity: 6,464	Capacity: 16,310	Capacity: 11,999
Giravanz Kitakyushu	FC Imabari	Iwaki FC	Kagoshima United	Kamatamare Sanuki	Kataller Toyama
Mikuni World Stadium Kitakyushu	Arigato Service Dream Stadium	J-Village Stadium	Shiranami Stadium	Pikara Stadium	Toyama Stadium
Capacity: 15,300	Capacity: 5,063	Capacity: 5,063	Capacity: 12,606	Capacity: 22,338	Capacity: 18,588
Matsumoto Yamaga	Nagano Parceiro	SC Sagamihara	Tegevajaro Miyazaki	Vanraure Hachinohe	YSCC Yokohama
Sunpro Alwin	Nagano U Stadium	Sagamihara Gion Stadium	Unilever Stadium Shintomi	Prifoods Stadium	Nippatsu Mitsuzawa Stadium
Capacity: 20,000	Capacity: 15,515	Capacity: 15,300	Capacity: 5,354	Capacity: 5,124	Capacity: 15,440

== Season statistics ==
=== Goal contributions ===
==== Top scorers ====
Rank	Player	Club	Goals
1	(Japan) Ryo Arita	Iwaki FC	17
2	(Japan) Kosuke Fujioka	FC Gifu	16
3	(Japan) Koki Arita	Kagoshima United	15
3	(Japan) Daichi Ishikawa	Gainare Tottori	15
5	(Japan) Yuki Okada	Tegevajaro Miyazaki	14

==== Top assists ====
Rank	Player	Club	Assists
1	(Japan) Yudai Tokunaga	Tegevajaro Miyazaki	12
2	(Japan) Riku Saga	Iwaki FC	9
3	(Japan) Akiyuki Yokoyama	Fujieda MYFC	8
4	(Japan) Ikki Kawasaki	Kamatamare Sanuki	7
4	(Japan) Takashi Kondo	Ehime FC	7
4	(Japan) Yuji Kimura	Kagoshima United	7

=== Discipline ===
==== Player ====
- Most yellow cards: 8
  - (Japan) Kento Dodate (YSCC Yokohama)
- Most red cards: 1
  - (Japan) Naoki Sato (Azul Claro Numazu)
  - (Japan) Kenshiro Suzuki (Azul Claro Numazu)
  - (Japan) Takashi Akiyama (Fujieda MYFC)
  - (Japan) Nobuyuki Kawashima (Fujieda MYFC)
  - (Japan) Kazuki Dohana (Fukushima United)
  - (Japan) Takumi Baba (Gainare Tottori)
  - (Japan) Koshiro Itohara (Gainare Tottori)
  - (Japan) Takumi Fujitani (FC Gifu)
  - (Brazil) Freire (FC Gifu)
  - (Brazil) Marcus Índio (FC Imabari)
  - (Japan) Yuji Kimura (Kagoshima United)
  - (Peru) Frank Romero (Kagoshima United)
  - (Japan) Rei Yonezawa (Kagoshima United)
  - (Japan) Akira Ando (Matsumoto Yamaga)
  - (Japan) Hiroshi Azuma (Nagano Parceiro)
  - (Japan) Hayate Sugii (Nagano Parceiro)
  - (Japan) Ryoma Ishida (SC Sagamihara)
  - (Japan) Shunsuke Ueda (Tegevajaro Miyazaki)
  - (Japan) Masanobu Komaki (Vanraure Hachinohe)
  - (Japan) Kento Dodate (YSCC Yokohama)
  - (Japan) Riku Furuyado (YSCC Yokohama)

==== Club ====
- Most yellow cards: 58 (YSCC Yokohama)
- Most red cards: 3 (Kagoshima United)

== Awards ==
=== Monthly awards ===
Month	Manager of the Month		Monthly MVP		Goal of the Month		References
Month	Manager	Club	Player	Club	Player	Club	References
February/March	(Japan) Toshihiro Hattori	Fukushima United	(Japan) Hiroki Higuchi	Fukushima United	(Japan) Kazaki Nakagawa	FC Imabari	
April	(Japan) Hiroshi Nanami	Matsumoto Yamaga	(Japan) Ayumu Yokoyama	Matsumoto Yamaga	(Japan) Yuya Takazawa	Giravanz Kitakyushu	
May	(Japan) Naoto Otake	Kagoshima United	(Japan) Koki Arita	Kagoshima United	(Japan) Yuki Oshitani	Fujieda MYFC	
June	(Japan) Nobuhiro Ishizaki	Kataller Toyama	(Japan) Hiroto Iwabuchi	Iwaki FC	(Japan) Yohei Ono	Kataller Toyama	
July	(Japan) Daisuke Sudo	Fujieda MYFC	(Japan) Tojiro Kubo	Fujieda MYFC	(Japan) Daisuke Matsui	YSCC Yokohama	
August	(Japan) Hiromasa Suguri	Iwaki FC	(Japan) Ryo Arita	Iwaki FC	(Japan) Shota Suzuki	Iwaki FC	
September	(Japan) Daisuke Sudo	Fujieda MYFC	(Japan) Kei Uchiyama	Fujieda MYFC	(Luxembourg) Loris Tinelli	YSCC Yokohama	
October/November	(Japan) Hiromasa Suguri	Iwaki FC	(Japan) Ryo Arita	Iwaki FC	(Brazil) Marcus Índio	FC Imabari	
