= Yamamuro =

Yamamuro (written: 山室) is a Japanese surname. Notable people with the surname include:

- Koji Yamamuro (山室 光史, born 1989), Japanese gymnast
- Koshiro Yamamuro (山室 公志郎, born 1987), Japanese baseball player
