= Sugii =

Sugii (written: 杉井 lit. "Japanese cedar well") is a Japanese surname. Notable people with the surname include:

- Gisaburō Sugii (杉井 儀三郎, born 1940), Japanese anime director and artist
- Hayate Sugii (杉井 颯, born 2000), Japanese footballer
- Hikaru Sugii (杉井 光, born 1978), Japanese writer
