= Haruki Toyama =

Japanese footballer

Personal information
- Date of birth: 6 November 2003 (age 23)
- Place of birth: Kyoto, Japan
- Height: 1.70 m (5 ft 7 in)
- Position: Midfielder

Team information
- Current team: Azul Claro Numazu
- Number: 6

Youth career
- –2021: Kyoto Sanga

Senior career*
Years	Team	Apps	(Gls)
2022–	Azul Claro Numazu	69	(1)

International career
- Japan U15
- Japan U18
- Japan U19
- * Club domestic league appearances and goals as of 1 January 2026

Haruki Toyama (遠山 悠希, Toyama Haruki; born 6 November 2003) is a Japanese footballer currently playing as a midfielder for Azul Claro Numazu.

== Club career ==
Toyama joined Azul Claro Numazu from Kyoto Sanga ahead of the 2022 season.

== International career ==
Toyama has represented Japan at under-15, under-18 and under-19 level.

== Career statistics ==
=== Club ===
As of 13 March 2022.

Club	Season	League			National Cup		League Cup		Other		Total	
Club	Season	Division	Apps	Goals	Apps	Goals	Apps	Goals	Apps	Goals	Apps	Goals
Azul Claro Numazu	2022	J3 League	1	0	0	0	–		0	0	1	0
Career total			1	0	0	0	0	0	0	0	1	0
