= Takashi Kawano =

Japanese footballer (born 1996)

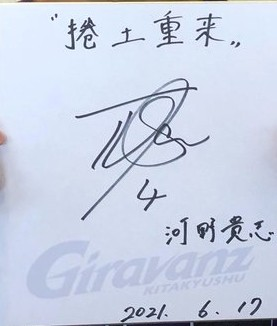

Personal information
- Full name: Takashi Kawano
- Date of birth: 17 June 1996 (age 30)
- Place of birth: Tsuno, Miyazaki, Japan
- Height: 1.85 m (6 ft 1 in)
- Position: Defender

Team information
- Current team: JEF United Chiba
- Number: 28

Youth career
- –2008: Tsuno FC
- 2009–2011: Tsuno Junior High School
- 2012–2014: Hosho High School

College career
Years	Team	Apps	(Gls)
2015–2018	Kansai University		

Senior career*
Years	Team	Apps	(Gls)
2019–2022	Giravanz Kitakyushu	70	(2)
2023–2024	Blaublitz Akita	77	(5)
2025–	JEF United Chiba	43	(2)
- * Club domestic league appearances and goals as of 12 August 2026

Takashi Kawano (河野 貴志, Kawano Takashi; born 17 June 1996) is a Japanese professional footballer who plays as a defender for JEF United Chiba.

== Career ==
Takashi Kawano was born on 17 June 1996 in Tsuno, Miyazaki. When he was 6, he joined the Tsuno Elementary School Soccer Club. After graduating from Kansai University, Kawano signed with the third tier club Giravanz Kitakyushu and made his professional debut against Blaublitz Akita on Matchweek 7 in 2019. He scored his first professional goal against Gamba Osaka U-23 on Matchweek 20, and another goal against Akita on Matchweek 29. Kitakyushu got promoted as the J3 League champions. In his fifth season Kawano joined Akita and bagged a headed goal against JEF United on Matchweek 4.

== Career statistics ==
=== Club ===
As of 13 December 2022.

Club	Season	League			National Cup		League Cup		Other		Total	
Club	Season	Division	Apps	Goals	Apps	Goals	Apps	Goals	Apps	Goals	Apps	Goals
Giravanz Kitakyushu	2019	J3 League	18	2	0	0	–		0	0	18	2
Giravanz Kitakyushu	2020	J2 League	10	0	–		–		0	0	10	0
Giravanz Kitakyushu	2021	J2 League	12	0	0	0	–		0	0	12	0
Giravanz Kitakyushu	2022	J3 League	30	0	1	0	–		0	0	31	0
Blaublitz Akita	2023	J2 League	0	0	0	0	–		0	0	0	0
Career total			70	2	1	0	0	0	0	0	71	2

== Honours ==
Giravanz Kitakyushu

- J3 League (1): 2019
