= Nguyễn Văn Sơn =

Nguyễn Văn Sơn may refer to:

- Nguyễn Văn Sơn (footballer) (born 2001), Vietnamese footballer
- Nguyễn Văn Sơn, Vietnamese fashion model, winner of Mister Global 2015
