= Kyowaan Hoshi =

Japanese footballer (born 1997)

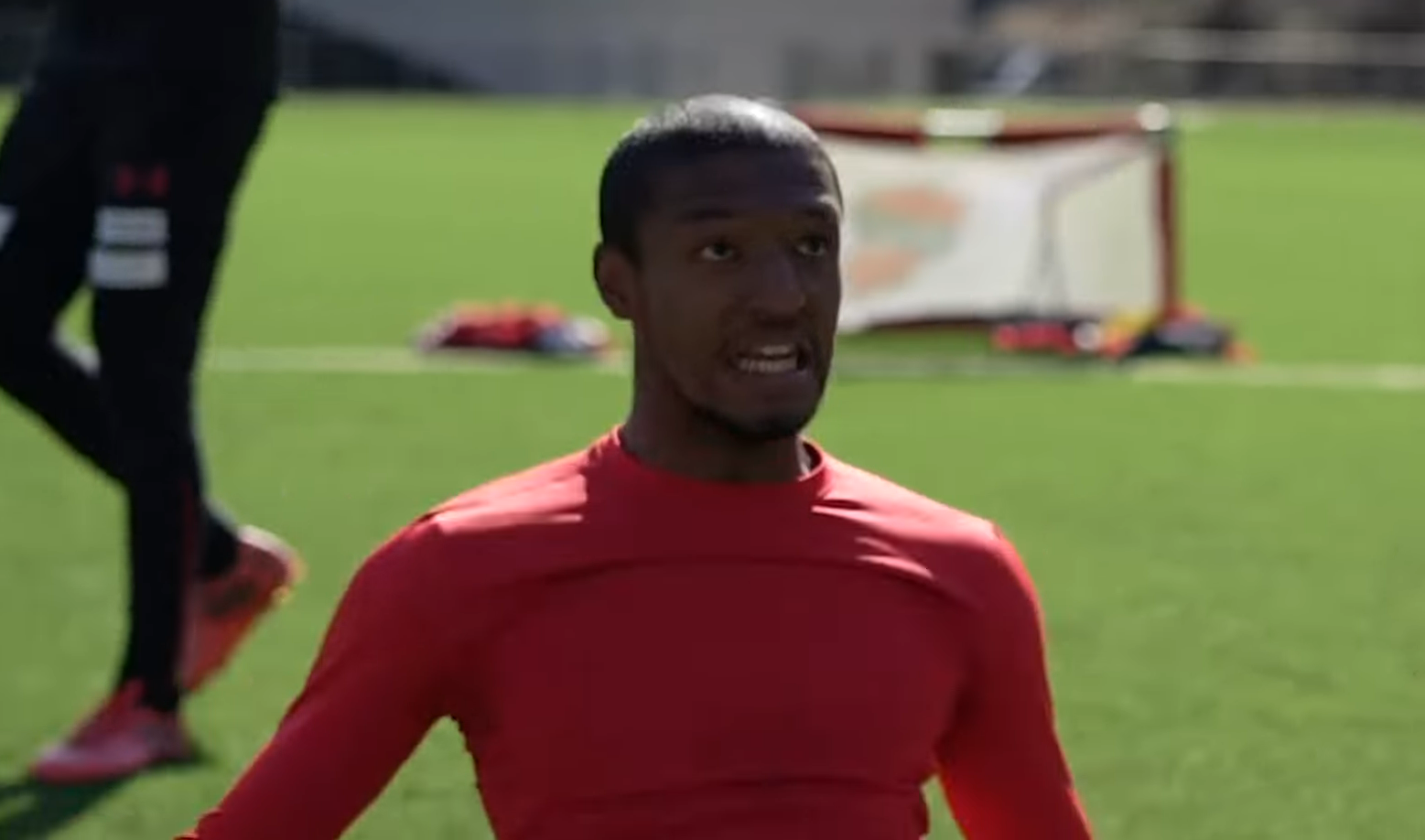
- Hoshi with Iwaki FC in 2022

Personal information
- Full name: Kyowaan Hoshi
- Date of birth: 25 June 1997 (age 29)
- Place of birth: Tokyo, Japan
- Height: 1.84 m (6 ft 0 in)
- Position: Defender

Team information
- Current team: Blaublitz Akita
- Number: 39

Youth career
- 2010–2012: Minami-kawachi Daini Junior High School
- 2013–2015: Yaita Chuo High School

College career
| Years | Team | Apps | (Gls) |
| 2016–2019 | Komazawa University | | |

Senior career*
| Years | Team | Apps | (Gls) |
| 2020–2022 | Yokohama FC | 9 | (0) |
| 2021 | → Matsumoto Yamaga (loan) | 20 | (0) |
| 2022 | → Iwaki FC (loan) | 13 | (0) |
| 2023– | Blaublitz Akita | 2 | (0) |
- * Club domestic league appearances and goals as of 1 January 2026

Kyowaan Hoshi (星 キョーワァン, Hoshi Kyowaan; born 25 June 1997) is a Japanese footballer currently playing as a defender for Blaublitz Akita.

== Career ==
Hoshi was born in Tokyo and raised in Shimotsuke, Tochigi. He learned to play football at Minami-kawachi Daini Junior High School and Yaita Chuo High School. After graduating from Komazawa University, he signed with J1 club Yokohama FC in 2020. Hoshi made his professional debut as a starter on 4th of July. In his second season, he was loaned to J2 team Matsumoto Yamaga and played 20 games. Later, he was transferred to Iwaki FC but suffered a thigh bone injury and missed three months. He ended the 2022 season as the J3 champion, scored 0 goals in 13 appearances for Iwaki. In his 4th season, he signed with second tier club Blaublitz Akita.

== Career statistics ==
=== Club ===
As of 8 December 2022.

| Club | Season | League | | | National Cup | | League Cup | | Other | | Total | |
| Club | Season | Division | Apps | Goals | Apps | Goals | Apps | Goals | Apps | Goals | Apps | Goals |
|---|---|---|---|---|---|---|---|---|---|---|---|---|
| Komazawa University | 2018 | | 0 | 0 | 1 | 0 | - | | 0 | 0 | 1 | 0 |
| Yokohama FC | 2020 | J1 League | 9 | 0 | 0 | 0 | 0 | 0 | 0 | 0 | 9 | 0 |
| Yokohama FC | 2021 | J1 League | 0 | 0 | 0 | 0 | 0 | 0 | 0 | 0 | 0 | 0 |
| Yokohama FC | Total | | 9 | 0 | 0 | 0 | 0 | 0 | 0 | 0 | 9 | 0 |
| Matsumoto Yamaga (loan) | 2021 | J2 League | 20 | 0 | 2 (Note: Appearances in the Emperor's Cup) | 0 | - | | 0 | 0 | 22 | 0 |
| Iwaki FC (loan) | 2022 | J3 League | 13 | 0 | 0 | 0 | - | | 0 | 0 | 13 | 0 |
| Blaublitz Akita | 2023 | J2 League | 0 | 0 | 0 | 0 | - | | 0 | 0 | 0 | 0 |
| Career total | | | 42 | 0 | 3 | 0 | 0 | 0 | 0 | 0 | 45 | 0 |

== Honours ==
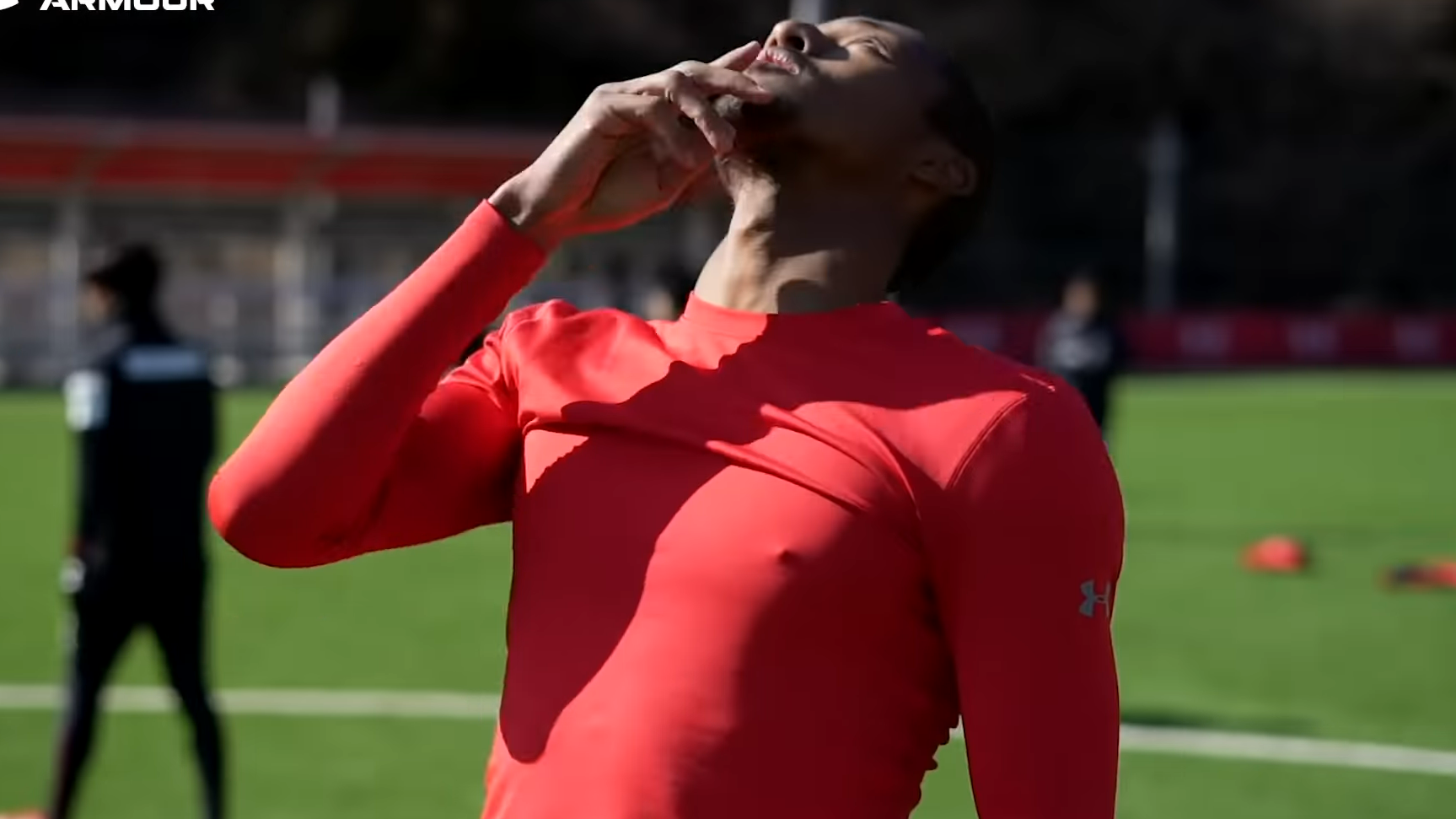
Hoshi with Iwaki FC

Iwaki FC

- J3 League: 2022

== Personal life ==
Born and raised in Japan, his father hails from the Democratic Republic of the Congo.
