= Yuma Mori =

Japanese footballer

Personal information
- Date of birth: 2 July 2001 (age 25)
- Place of birth: Mie, Japan
- Height: 1.70 m (5 ft 7 in)
- Position: Midfielder

Team information
- Current team: Azul Claro Numazu
- Number: 21

Youth career
- Kawajima SSS
- Aferrarse Yokkaichi
- 2017–2019: Yokkaichi Chuo Kogyo High School

Senior career*
Years	Team	Apps	(Gls)
2020–	Azul Claro Numazu	134	(11)
- * Club domestic league appearances and goals as of 1 January 2026

Yuma Mori (森 夢真, Mori Yuma; born 2 July 2001) is a Japanese footballer currently playing as a midfielder for Azul Claro Numazu of J3 League.

== Career statistics ==
=== Club ===
As of 10 November 2020.

Club	Season	League			National Cup		League Cup		Other		Total	
Club	Season	Division	Apps	Goals	Apps	Goals	Apps	Goals	Apps	Goals	Apps	Goals
Azul Claro Numazu	2020	J3 League	7	0	0	0	–		0	0	7	0
Career total			7	0	0	0	0	0	0	0	7	0
