= Kaito Abe (footballer, born September 1999) =

Japanese professional footballer

Kaito Abe 阿部 海大
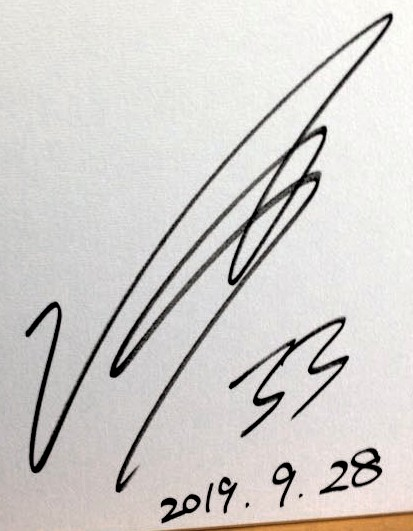

Personal information
- Full name: Kaito Abe
- Date of birth: 18 September 1999 (age 27)
- Place of birth: Kitsuki, Ōita, Japan
- Height: 1.81 m (5 ft 11 1/2 in)
- Position: Defender

Team information
- Current team: Sagan Tosu
- Number: 44

Youth career
- Kitsuki FC
- –2014: SMIS Selecao Sports
- 2015–2017: Higashi Fukuoka High School

Senior career*
Years	Team	Apps	(Gls)
2018–2026	Fagiano Okayama	99	(1)
2023	→ Blaublitz Akita (loan)	29	(1)
2026–	Sagan Tosu	1	(0)

International career
- Japan U-18
- * Club domestic league appearances and goals as of 14 August 2026

Kaito Abe (阿部 海大, Abe Kaito; born September 18, 1999 in Kitsuki, Ōita) is a Japanese professional footballer who plays as a defender for J2 League club Sagan Tosu.

== Club career ==
After attending Higashifukuoka High School, Abe signed for Fagiano Okayama for 2018 season and unexpectedly found immediate space, even scoring on his 2nd ever cap in J2 League against Tochigi SC. In his sixth season he was loaned to Blaublitz Akita and bagged a goal against Machida Zelvia on Matchweek 8.

== Club statistics ==
Updated to 20 December 2022.

Appearances and goals by club, season and competition
Club	Season	League			Emperor's Cup		Total	
Club	Season	Division	Apps	Goals	Apps	Goals	Apps	Goals
Fagiano Okayama	2018	J2 League	7	1	1	0	8	1
Fagiano Okayama	2019	J2 League	0	0	0	0	0	0
Fagiano Okayama	2020	J2 League	5	0	0	0	5	0
Fagiano Okayama	2021	J2 League	16	0	2	0	18	0
Fagiano Okayama	2022	J2 League	12	0	1	0	13	0
Blaublitz Akita	2023	J2 League	0	0	0	0	0	0
Total			40	1	4	0	44	1
