= Kotaro Tokunaga =

Japanese footballer

Personal information
- Date of birth: 10 November 1996 (age 30)
- Place of birth: Osaka, Japan
- Height: 1.64 m (5 ft 5 in)
- Position: Midfielder

Team information
- Current team: Azul Claro Numazu
- Number: 14

Youth career
- Global Football Academy
- Osaka Central FC
- Risshō University Shōnan High School

College career
| Years | Team | Apps | (Gls) |
| 2015–2018 | Momoyama Gakuin University | | |

Senior career*
| Years | Team | Apps | (Gls) |
| 2019– | Azul Claro Numazu | 161 | (5) |
- * Club domestic league appearances and goals as of 1 January 2026

Kotaro Tokunaga (徳永 晃太郎, Tokunaga Kotaro; born 10 November 1996) is a Japanese footballer currently playing as a midfielder for Azul Claro Numazu of J3 League.

== Career statistics ==
=== Club ===
As of 21 March 2020.

| Club | Season | League | | | National Cup | | League Cup | | Other | | Total | |
| Club | Season | Division | Apps | Goals | Apps | Goals | Apps | Goals | Apps | Goals | Apps | Goals |
|---|---|---|---|---|---|---|---|---|---|---|---|---|
| Azul Claro Numazu | 2019 | J3 League | 18 | 1 | 0 | 0 | – | | 0 | 0 | 18 | 1 |
| Azul Claro Numazu | 2020 | J3 League | 4 | 0 | 0 | 0 | – | | 0 | 0 | 4 | 0 |
| Azul Claro Numazu | 2021 | J3 League | 0 | 0 | 0 | 0 | – | | 0 | 0 | 0 | 0 |
| Career total | | | 22 | 1 | 0 | 0 | 0 | 0 | 0 | 0 | 22 | 1 |
