= Hiroto Tanaka =

Japanese footballer

Hiroto Tanaka 田中 裕人
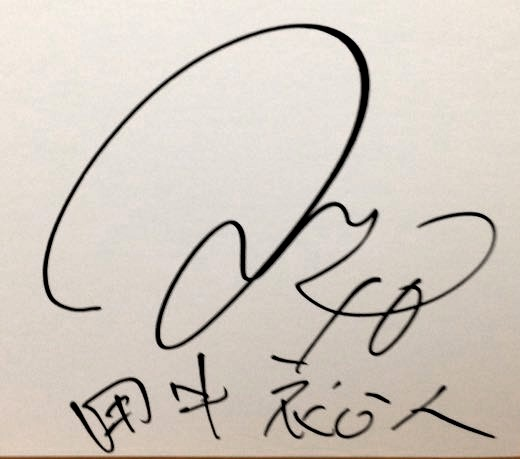

Personal information
- Full name: Hiroto Tanaka
- Date of birth: 26 April 1990 (age 36)
- Place of birth: Osaka, Japan
- Height: 1.75 m (5 ft 9 in)
- Position: Midfielder

Youth career
- 2003–2008: Gamba Osaka Youth
- 2009–2012: Kansai University

Senior career*
Years	Team	Apps	(Gls)
2013–2017	Júbilo Iwata	26	(0)
2016	→ V-Varen Nagasaki (loan)	37	(0)
2017	→ Ehime FC (loan)	22	(0)
2018–2022	Ehime FC	166	(4)
2023	Blaublitz Akita	16	(0)
Total		267	(4)

International career
2007	Japan U-17	1	(0)
Medal record
Representing Japan
AFC U-16 Championship
Gold medal – first place	2006 Singapore
- * Club domestic league appearances and goals

Hiroto Tanaka (田中 裕人, Tanaka Hiroto; born 26 April 1990 in Osaka) is a Japanese former footballer who played as a midfielder. Tanaka came through the youth academy at Gamba Osaka and represented Kansai University before beginning his professional career at Júbilo Iwata in 2013. He had loan spells at V-Varen Nagasaki in 2016 and Ehime FC in 2017 before joining Ehime FC permanently in 2018, making 167 appearances. He later joined Blaublitz Akita in 2023 and announced his retirement at the end of the 2023 season. He has represented the Japan U-17 national team.

== Club career ==
Tanaka signed for Júbilo Iwata from Kansai University in January 2013. Then on 20 March 2013 Tanaka made his professional debut for Iwata against Omiya Ardija in the J. League Cup at the NACK5 Stadium Omiya in which he came on in the 76th minute for Kosuke Yamamoto as Iwata won the match 2–0.

== National team career ==
Tanaka represented the Japan U-17 national team at the 2007 U-17 World Cup in which he played one match against France on 25 August 2007 in which he played 82 minutes as Japan's lost the match 2–1.

== Club statistics ==
Appearances and goals by club, season and competition
Club	Season	League			National cup (Note: Includes Emperor's Cup)		League cup (Note: Includes J.League Cup)		Other		Total	
Club	Season	Division	Apps	Goals	Apps	Goals	Apps	Goals	Apps	Goals	Apps	Goals
Kansai University	2009	–			2	1	–		–		2	1
Kansai University	2012	–			2	0	–		–		2	0
Júbilo Iwata	2013	J.League Division 1	7	0	0	0	2	0	0	0	9	0
Júbilo Iwata	2014	J.League Division 2	5	0	0	0	0	0	1 (Note: Appearance in J1/J2 play-offs)	0	6	0
Júbilo Iwata	2015	J2 League	14	0	2	0	0	0	0	0	16	0
Júbilo Iwata	Total		26	0	2	0	2	0	1	0	31	0
V-Varen Nagasaki (loan)	2016	J2 League	37	0	1	0	–		–		38	0
Ehime FC (loan)	2017	J2 League	22	0	2	0	–		–		24	0
Ehime FC	2018	J2 League	41	0	1	0	–		–		42	0
Ehime FC	2019	J2 League	40	2	0	0	–		–		40	2
Ehime FC	2020	J2 League	29	0	0	0	–		–		29	0
Ehime FC	2021	J2 League	32	0	0	0	–		–		32	0
Ehime FC	2022	J3 League	24	2	0	0	–		–		24	2
Ehime FC	Total		166	4	1	0	0	0	0	0	167	4
Blaublitz Akita	2023	J2 League	16	0	1	0	–		–		17	0
Career total			267	4	11	1	2	0	1	0	281	5
