= Terukazu Shinozaki =

Japanese footballer

Personal information
- Date of birth: 13 May 1998 (age 28)
- Place of birth: Ibaraki, Japan
- Height: 1.83 m (6 ft 0 in)
- Position: Defender

Team information
- Current team: Azul Claro Numazu
- Number: 26

Youth career
- –2016: Kashima Antlers

College career
Years	Team	Apps	(Gls)
2017–2020	Sanno Institute of Management		

Senior career*
Years	Team	Apps	(Gls)
2021–	Azul Claro Numazu	74	(4)
- * Club domestic league appearances and goals as of 1 January 2026

Terukazu Shinozaki (篠崎 輝和, Shinozaki Terukazu; born 13 May 1998) is a Japanese footballer currently playing as a defender for Azul Claro Numazu.

== Career statistics ==
=== Club ===
As of 19 September 2021.

Club	Season	League			National Cup		League Cup		Other		Total	
Club	Season	Division	Apps	Goals	Apps	Goals	Apps	Goals	Apps	Goals	Apps	Goals
Azul Claro Numazu	2021	J3 League	1	0	0	0	–		0	0	1	0
Career total			1	0	0	0	0	0	0	0	1	0
