= Shunsuke Ueda =

Japanese footballer

Shunsuke Ueda 植田 峻佑
Personal information
- Full name: Shunsuke Ueda
- Date of birth: 4 April 1988 (age 38)
- Place of birth: Yachiyo, Chiba, Japan
- Height: 1.81 m (5 ft 11 in)
- Position: Goalkeeper

Team information
- Current team: FC Imabari
- Number: 47

Youth career
- –2003: Wings SS Narashino
- 2004–2006: Yachiyo High School

College career
Years	Team	Apps	(Gls)
2007–2010	International Pacific University		

Senior career*
Years	Team	Apps	(Gls)
2011	Fukushima United	0	(0)
2012–2013	Volca Kagoshima		
2014–2017	Kagoshima United	24	(0)
2018	Saurcos Fukui	6	(0)
2019	Fukui United	14	(0)
2020–2024	Tegevajaro Miyazaki	66	(0)
2025–	FC Imabari	2	(0)
- * Club domestic league appearances and goals as of 1 January 2026

Shunsuke Ueda (植田 峻佑, Ueda Shunsuke; born 4 April 1988 in Yachiyo, Chiba) is a Japanese footballer who plays as a Goalkeeper and currently play for J2 League club, FC Imabari.

== Career ==
After five years at the club, Ueda left from Tegevajaro Miyazaki in 2024.

On 30 December 2024, Ueda announce official transfer to J2 promoted club, FC Imabari from 2025 season.

== Career statistics ==
=== Club ===
As of the start from 2025 season.

Club performance			League		Cup		League Cup		Total	
Season	Club	League	Apps	Goals	Apps	Goals	Apps	Goals	Apps	Goals
Japan			League		Emperor's Cup		J.League Cup		Total	
2010	International Pacific University	–			1	0	–		1	0
2011	Volca Kagoshima	Kyushu	12	0	0	0	–		12	0
2013	Volca Kagoshima	Kyushu	17	0	2	0	–		19	0
2013	Volca Kagoshima	Kyushu	16	0	0	0	–		16	0
2014	Kagoshima United	JFL	15	0	1	0	–		16	0
2015	Kagoshima United	JFL	8	0	1	0	–		9	0
2016	Kagoshima United	J3 League	1	0	0	0	–		1	0
2017	Kagoshima United	J3 League	0	0	0	0	–		0	0
2018	Saurcos Fukui	JRL (Hokushinetsu, Div. 1)	6	0	1	0	–		7	0
2019	Fukui United	JRL (Hokushinetsu, Div. 1)	14	0	1	0	–		15	0
2020	Tegevajaro Miyazaki	JFL	5	0	1	0	–		6	0
2021	Tegevajaro Miyazaki	J3 League	20	0	0	0	–		20	0
2022	Tegevajaro Miyazaki	J3 League	22	0	0	0	–		22	0
2023	Tegevajaro Miyazaki	J3 League	15	0	1	0	–		16	0
2024	Tegevajaro Miyazaki	J3 League	2	0	0	0	0	0	2	0
2025	FC Imabari	J2 League	0	0	0	0	0	0	0	0
Career total			153	0	9	0	0	0	162	0
