= Hiroto Morooka =

Japanese professional footballer

Hiroto Morooka 諸岡 裕人
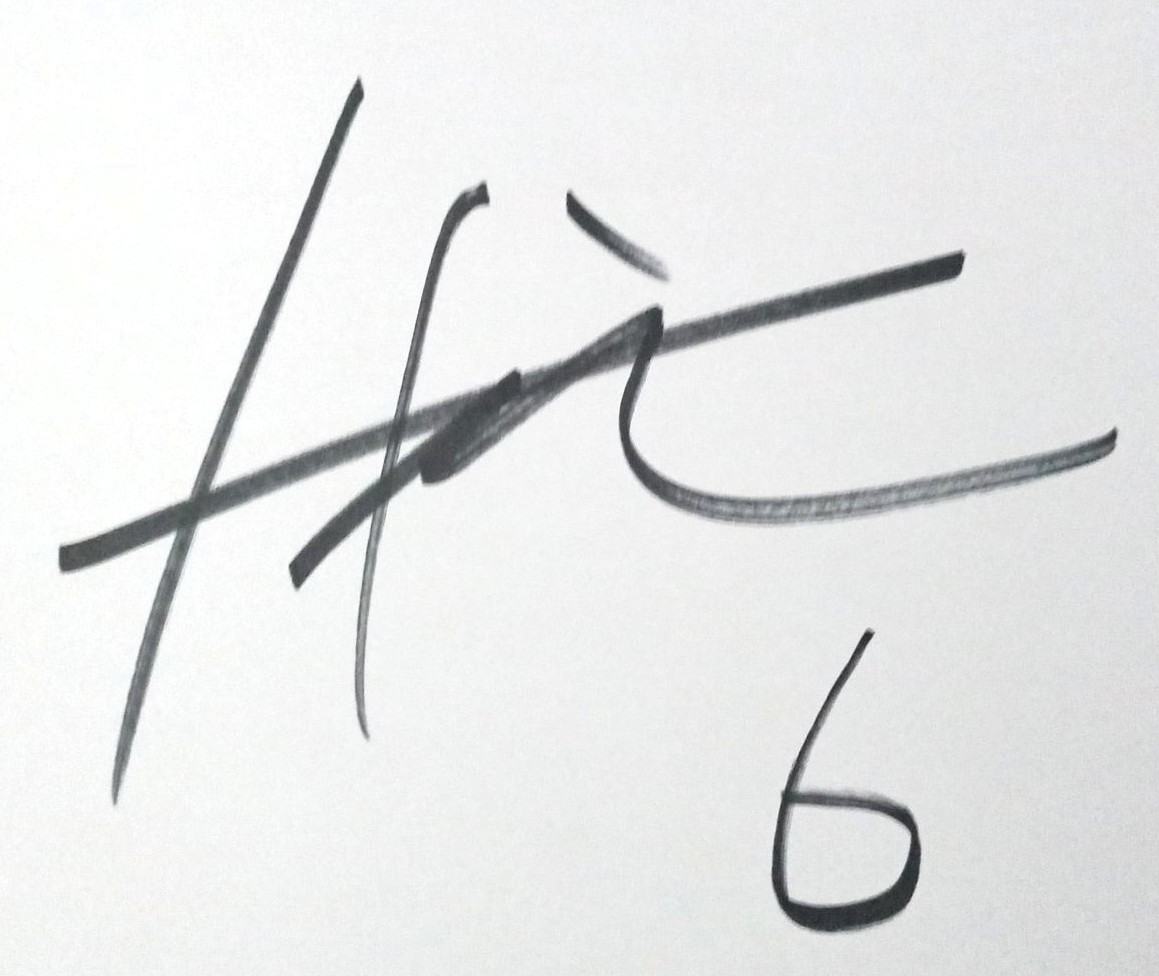

Personal information
- Full name: Hiroto Morooka
- Date of birth: 4 January 1997 (age 29)
- Place of birth: Setagaya, Tokyo, Japan
- Height: 1.68 m (5 ft 6 in)
- Position: Midfielder

Team information
- Current team: Kyoto Sanga
- Number: 24

Youth career
- –2011: FC Toripletta
- 2012–2014: Shochi Fukaya High School

College career
Years	Team	Apps	(Gls)
2015–2018	Kokushikan University		

Senior career*
Years	Team	Apps	(Gls)
2019–2022	Fukushima United FC	87	(2)
2023–2026	Blaublitz Akita	111	(3)
2026–	Kyoto Sanga	1	(0)
- * Club domestic league appearances and goals as of 13:34, 14 October 2026 (UTC)

Hiroto Morooka (諸岡 裕人, Morooka Hiroto; born 4 January 1997) is a Japanese professional footballer who plays as a midfielder for J1 League club Kyoto Sanga.

== Career ==
Morooka learned to play soccer in the school team at Shochi Fukaya High School and the college team of Kokushikan University. He signed his first contract with Fukushima United FC in 2019. The club in Fukushima City plays in the third Japanese division, the J3 League. He made his professional debut as a starter on 9 March and in his first season he crossed a ball to Origbaajo Ismaila. But he suffered from knee injuries and missed six months. He gave another grounded assist to Ismaila in 2020. Appointed Fukushima captain in his fourth season, he netted his first professional goal on Matchweek 18. Morooka hit another volley goal in a 3–1 loss to Fujieda on Matchweek 33. For Fukushima he played 87 games. In January 2023 he signed a contract with the second tier club Blaublitz Akita. On Matchweek 10 he bagged a goal in a 2–1 win against Omiya Ardija. However he was injured in a tackle by Shu Yoshizawa on Matchweek 15.

== Career statistics ==
=== Club ===
As of 14 October 2026.

Appearances and goals by club, season and competition
Club	Season	League			National cup (Note: Includes Emperor's Cup)		League cup (Note: Includes J.League Cup)		Total	
Club	Season	Division	Apps	Goals	Apps	Goals	Apps	Goals	Apps	Goals
Kokushikan University	2017	–			2	0	–		2	0
Fukushima United	2019	J3 League	8	0	0	0	–		8	0
Fukushima United	2020	J3 League	29	0	0	0	–		29	0
Fukushima United	2021	J3 League	18	0	0	0	–		18	0
Fukushima United	2022	J3 League	32	2	2	0	–		34	2
Fukushima United	Total		87	2	2	0	0	0	89	2
Blaublitz Akita	2023	J2 League	32	2	0	0	0	0	32	2
Blaublitz Akita	2024	J2 League	35	0	0	0	2	0	37	0
Blaublitz Akita	2025	J2 League	23	0	2	0	2	0	27	0
Blaublitz Akita	2026	J2/J3 (100)	15	0	–		–		15	0
Blaublitz Akita	2026–27	J2 League	6	1	0	0	0	0	6	1
Blaublitz Akita	Total		111	3	2	0	4	0	117	3
Kyoto Sanga	2026–27	J1 League	1	0	1	0	1	0	3	0
Career total			199	5	7	0	5	0	211	5
