= Shota Suzuki (footballer, born 1996) =

Japanese footballer

Personal information
- Date of birth: 21 November 1996 (age 29)
- Place of birth: Fujieda, Shizuoka, Japan
- Height: 1.79 m (5 ft 10 in)
- Position: Defender

Team information
- Current team: Fujieda MYFC
- Number: 3

Youth career
- –2014: Shimizu S-Pulse

College career
Years	Team	Apps	(Gls)
2015–2018	Tokyo Gakugei University		

Senior career*
Years	Team	Apps	(Gls)
2019–	Fujieda MYFC	114	(3)
- * Club domestic league appearances and goals as of 13 August 2026

Shota Suzuki (鈴木 翔太, Suzuki Shota; born 21 November 1996) is a Japanese professional footballer who plays as a defender for Fujieda MYFC.

== Career ==
Suzuki began youth career in Shimizu S-Pulse until 2014, joined with Tokyo Gakugei University from 2015 until 2018.

In 2019, Suzuki joined J3 League side, Fujieda MYFC. In 2021, Suzuki debut play with Fujieda MYFC.

== Club statistics ==
As of 6 November 2022.

Club	Season	League			National Cup		League Cup		Other		Total	
Club	Season	Division	Apps	Goals	Apps	Goals	Apps	Goals	Apps	Goals	Apps	Goals
Fujieda MYFC	2019	J3 League	0	0	0	0	0	0	0	0	0	0
Fujieda MYFC	2020	J3 League	0	0	0	0	0	0	0	0	0	0
Fujieda MYFC	2021	J3 League	12	0	0	0	0	0	0	0	12	0
Fujieda MYFC	2022	J3 League	28	0	1	0	0	0	0	0	29	0
Career total			40	0	1	0	0	0	0	0	41	0
