= Daiki Yamamoto (baseball) =

Japanese baseball player (born 1995)

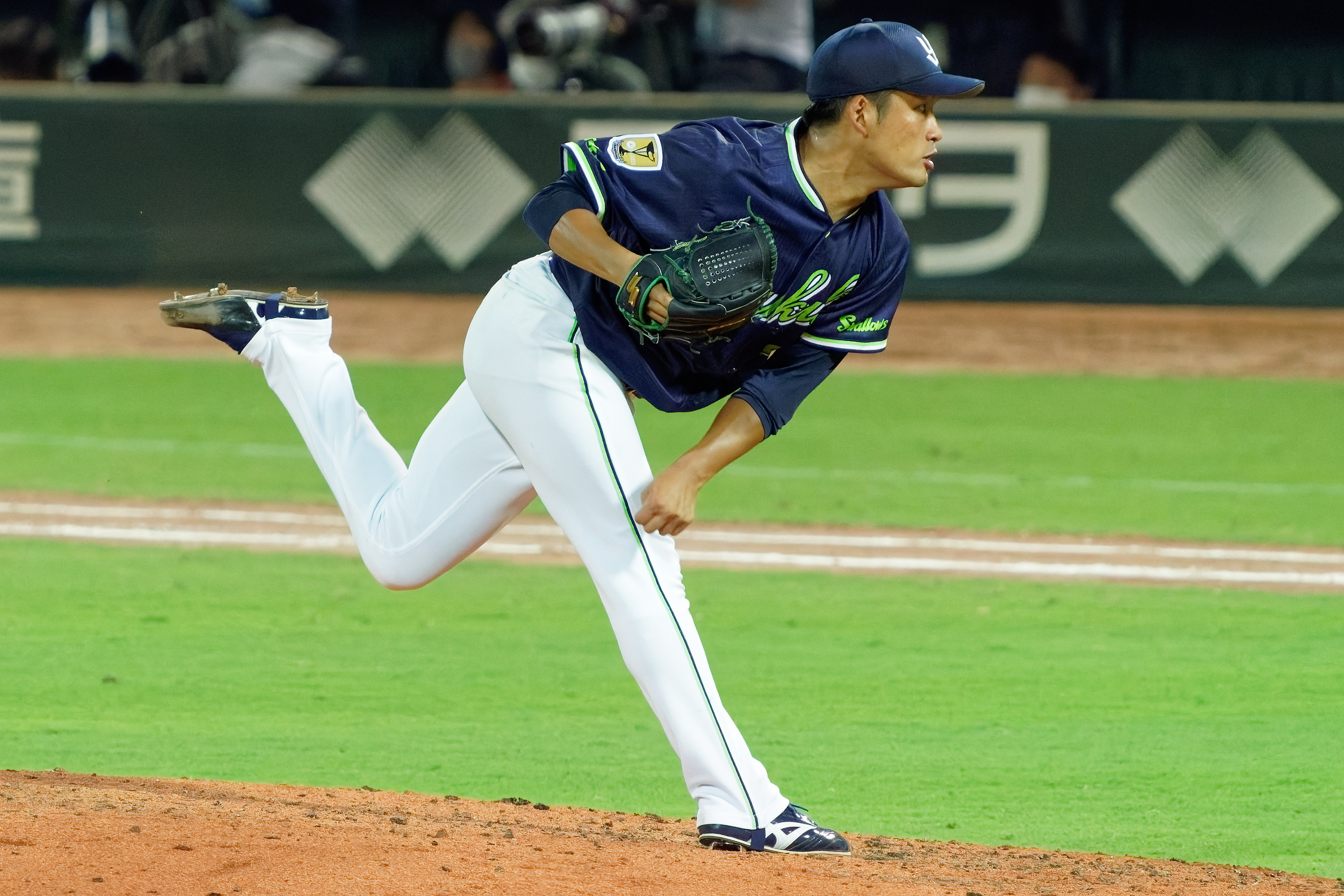
- Pitcher
- Born: November 10, 1995 (age 30); Sapporo, Hokkaido, Japan
- Batted: Left Threw: Left

NPB debut
- October 10, 2018, for the Chiba Lotte Marines

Last NPB appearance
- September 10, 2025, for the Tokyo Yakult Swallows

Career statistics
- Win–loss record: 5-1
- Earned Run Average: 3.00
- Strikeouts: 75
- Saves: 1
- Holds: 22
- Stats at Baseball Reference

Teams
- Chiba Lotte Marines (2018–2022); Tokyo Yakult Swallows (2022–2025)

Daiki Yamamoto (山本 大貴, Yamamoto Daiki; born November 10, 1995 in Sapporo, Hokkaido, Japan) is a professional Japanese baseball pitcher for the Tokyo Yakult Swallows of Nippon Professional Baseball (NPB). He previously played in NPB for the Chiba Lotte Marines.

== Career ==
=== Chiba Lotte Marines ===
On October 10, 2018, Yamamoto made his NPB debut for the Chiba Lotte Marines. He played for the team through the 2022 season.

=== Tokyo Yakult Swallows ===
On July 28, 2022, Yamamoto was traded to the Tokyo Yakult Swallows in exchange for Koshiro Sakamoto.
