= Wadi Ibrahim Suzuki =

Japanese footballer

Wadi Ibrahim Suzuki 鈴木 輪太朗 イブラヒーム
Personal information
- Date of birth: 31 January 2003 (age 23)
- Place of birth: Kanagawa, Japan
- Height: 1.92 m (6 ft 4 in)
- Position: Forward

Team information
- Current team: Tochigi SC
- Number: 20

Youth career
- Kawanakajima SC
- Ohmori FC
- Kawanakajima SC
- Yokohama FC
- 2018–2020: Nihon Univ. Fujisawa High School

Senior career*
Years	Team	Apps	(Gls)
2021–	Tokushima Vortis	4	(0)
2021–2022	→ Valencia (loan)	0	(0)
2022–2023	→ Badalona (loan)	20	(4)
2023–2024	→ Girona B (loan)	9	(3)
2025	→ Azul Claro Numazu (loan)	26	(2)
2026–	Tochigi SC	2	(0)

International career
2019	Japan U16		
2020–2021	Japan U18		
- * Club domestic league appearances and goals as of 17 August 2026

Wadi Ibrahim Suzuki (鈴木 輪太朗 イブラヒーム, Suzuki Wadi Iburahīmu; born 31 January 2003) is a Japanese footballer who currently plays as a forward for Tochigi SC.

== Club career ==
Suzuki started his career at Kawanakajima SC, spending two spells with the club either side of a stint at Ohmori FC. He joined professional side Yokohama FC, before playing football at the Nihon University Fujisawa High School.

In January 2021, he joined then-J1 League side Tokushima Vortis. He made his first appearance for the club in the J.League Cup on 3 March 2021, coming on as a half-time substitute for Akihiro Sato in a 1–0 loss to FC Tokyo.

In August 2021, he signed a two-year loan deal with Spanish side Valencia. He did not immediately settle into Valencia's under-19 side, and would have to wait until May of the following year to make his first start. Despite this slow start, he ended the season with three goals in twelve appearances at under-19 level.

Suzuki was recalled from his loan at Valencia, and sent to fellow Spanish side Badalona on another loan in September 2022.

On 7 July 2023, Suzuki officially transferred to Tercera Federación club Girona FC B on loan for the 2023–24 season.

On 30 December 2024, Suzuki was announced at Azul Claro Numazu on a one year loan.

== International career ==
Suzuki was born in Kanagawa to a Ghanaian father who played football and Japanese mother who played volleyball, basketball and swam competitively, making him eligible to represent both nations.

== Career statistics ==
=== Club ===
As of 7 July 2023.

Appearances and goals by club, season and competition
Club	Season	League			National Cup		League Cup		Other		Total	
Club	Season	Division	Apps	Goals	Apps	Goals	Apps	Goals	Apps	Goals	Apps	Goals
Tokushima Vortis	2021	J1 League	0	0	0	0	1 (Note: Appearances in the J.League Cup)	0	0	0	1	0
Tokushima Vortis	2022	J2 League	0	0	0	0	0	0	0	0	0	0
Tokushima Vortis	2023	J2 League	0	0	0	0	0	0	0	0	0	0
Tokushima Vortis	Total		0	0	0	0	1	0	0	0	1	0
Valencia (loan)	2021–22	La Liga	0	0	0	0	–		0	0	0	0
Badalona (loan)	2022–23	Tercera Federación	20	4	0	0	–		1 (Note: Appearances in the Copa Catalunya)	0	21	4
Girona FC B (loan)	2023–24	Tercera Federación	0	0	0	0	–		0	0	0	0
Career total			20	4	0	0	1	0	1	0	22	4
