= Kei Uchiyama =

Japanese footballer

Kei Uchiyama 内山 圭
Personal information
- Date of birth: 19 July 1993 (age 33)
- Place of birth: Kamakura, Kanagawa, Japan
- Height: 1.80 m (5 ft 11 in)
- Position: Goalkeeper

Team information
- Current team: Renofa Yamaguchi FC
- Number: 35

Youth career
- FC Hongo
- Yokohama F. Marinos
- 2006–2011: Kawasaki Frontale

College career
Years	Team	Apps	(Gls)
2012–2015	Tokai University		

Senior career*
Years	Team	Apps	(Gls)
2016–2017	Tokyo Musashino City	1	(0)
2017–2021	Roasso Kumamoto	36	(0)
2022	Fujieda MYFC	34	(0)
2023–2026	Sagan Tosu	0	(0)
2024	→ Fujieda MYFC (loan)	9	(0)
2026–	Renofa Yamaguchi FC	2	(0)
- * Club domestic league appearances and goals as of 21 August 2026

Kei Uchiyama (内山 圭, Uchiyama Kei; born 19 July 1993) is a Japanese professional footballer who plays as a goalkeeper for Renofa Yamaguchi FC.

== Club career ==
Uchiyama started his career with Kawasaki Frontale before enrolling at the Tokai University. Following his graduation, he signed to Japan Football League side Tokyo Musashino City. Having only made one appearance for the Tokyo-based side, he signed for J-League side Roasso Kumamoto. His career with Roasso did not kick off immediately, and he had to wait three years before making his debut in J3 League on 27 June 2020, playing the entirety of a 3-2 win against Kagoshima United.

== Career statistics ==
=== Club ===
As of 2 April 2023.

Club	Season	League			National Cup		League Cup		Other		Total	
Club	Season	Division	Apps	Goals	Apps	Goals	Apps	Goals	Apps	Goals	Apps	Goals
Japan			League		Emperor's Cup		J. League Cup		Other		Total	
Tokyo Musashino City	2016	JFL	1	0	0	0	–		–		1	0
Tokyo Musashino City	2017	JFL	0	0	0	0	–		–		0	0
Tokyo Musashino City	Total		1	0	0	0	0	0	0	0	1	0
Roasso Kumamoto	2017	J2 League	0	0	0	0	–		–		0	0
Roasso Kumamoto	2018	J2 League	0	0	0	0	–		–		0	0
Roasso Kumamoto	2019	J3 League	0	0	0	0	–		–		0	0
Roasso Kumamoto	2020	J3 League	34	0	0	0	–		–		34	0
Roasso Kumamoto	2021	J3 League	2	0	0	0	–		–		2	0
Roasso Kumamoto	Total		36	0	0	0	0	0	0	0	36	0
Fujieda MYFC	2022	J3 League	34	0	1	0	–		–		35	0
Sagan Tosu	2023	J1 League	0	0	0	0	1	0	–		1	0
Career total			71	0	1	0	1	0	0	0	73	0
