= Shuma Mihara =

Japanese footballer

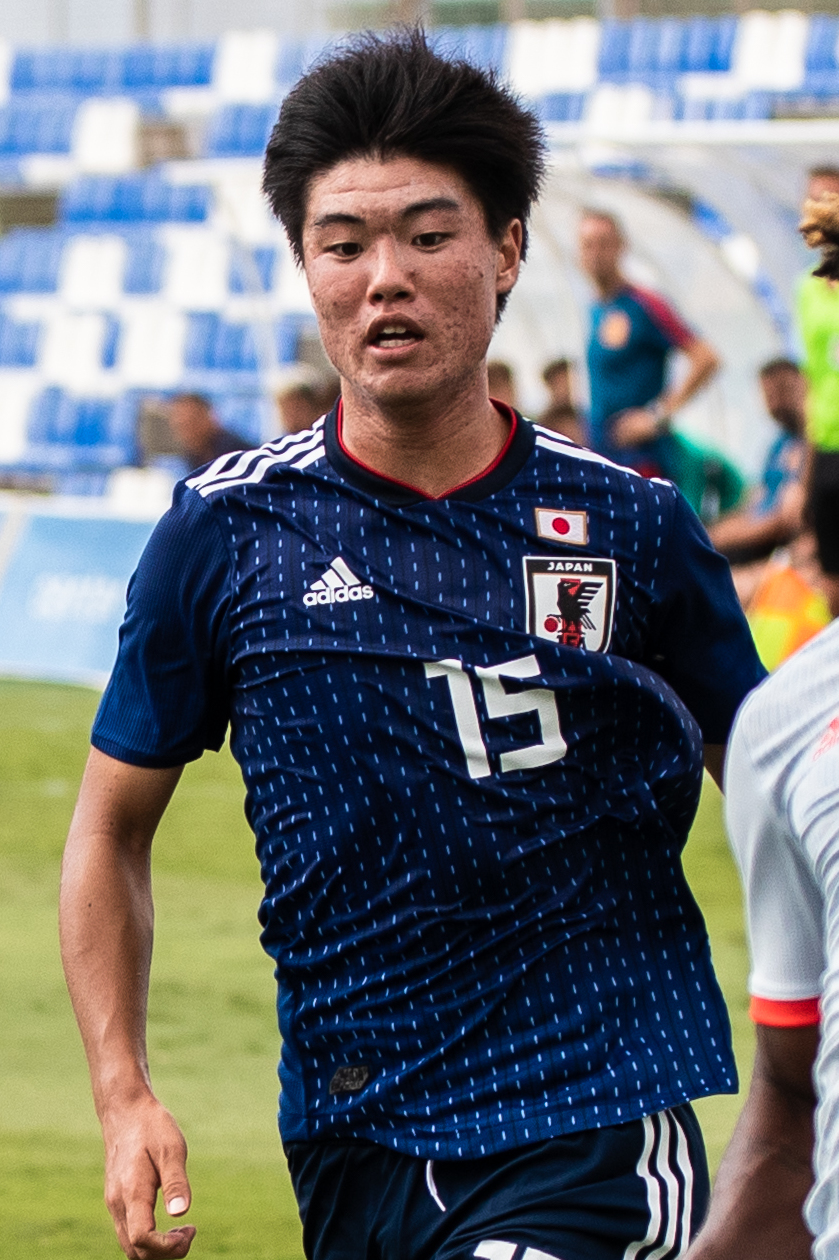
- Mihara playing for Japan U19 in 2019

Personal information
- Date of birth: 16 July 2001 (age 25)
- Place of birth: Matsuyama, Ehime, Japan
- Height: 1.72 m (5 ft 8 in)
- Position: Defender

Team information
- Current team: Azul Claro Numazu
- Number: 16

Youth career
- Teijin SS
- –2020: Ehime FC

Senior career*
Years	Team	Apps	(Gls)
2020–2024	Ehime FC	70	(4)
2025–	Azul Claro Numazu	29	(0)

International career^{‡}
2019	Japan U18	1	(1)
- * Club domestic league appearances and goals as of 1 January 2026 ‡ National team caps and goals as of 17:04, 23 February 2020 (UTC)

Shuma Mihara (三原 秀真, Mihara Shuma; born 16 July 2001) is a Japanese footballer who plays as a defender for Azul Claro Numazu.

== Career statistics ==
As of 10 November 2020.

Appearances and goals by club, season and competition
Club	Season	League			National Cup		League Cup		Other		Total	
Club	Season	Division	Apps	Goals	Apps	Goals	Apps	Goals	Apps	Goals	Apps	Goals
Ehime	2020	J2 League	12	1	0	0	0	0	0	0	12	1
Career total			12	1	0	0	0	0	0	0	12	1
