= Yōsuke Mikami =

Japanese footballer

Yōsuke Mikami 三上 陽輔
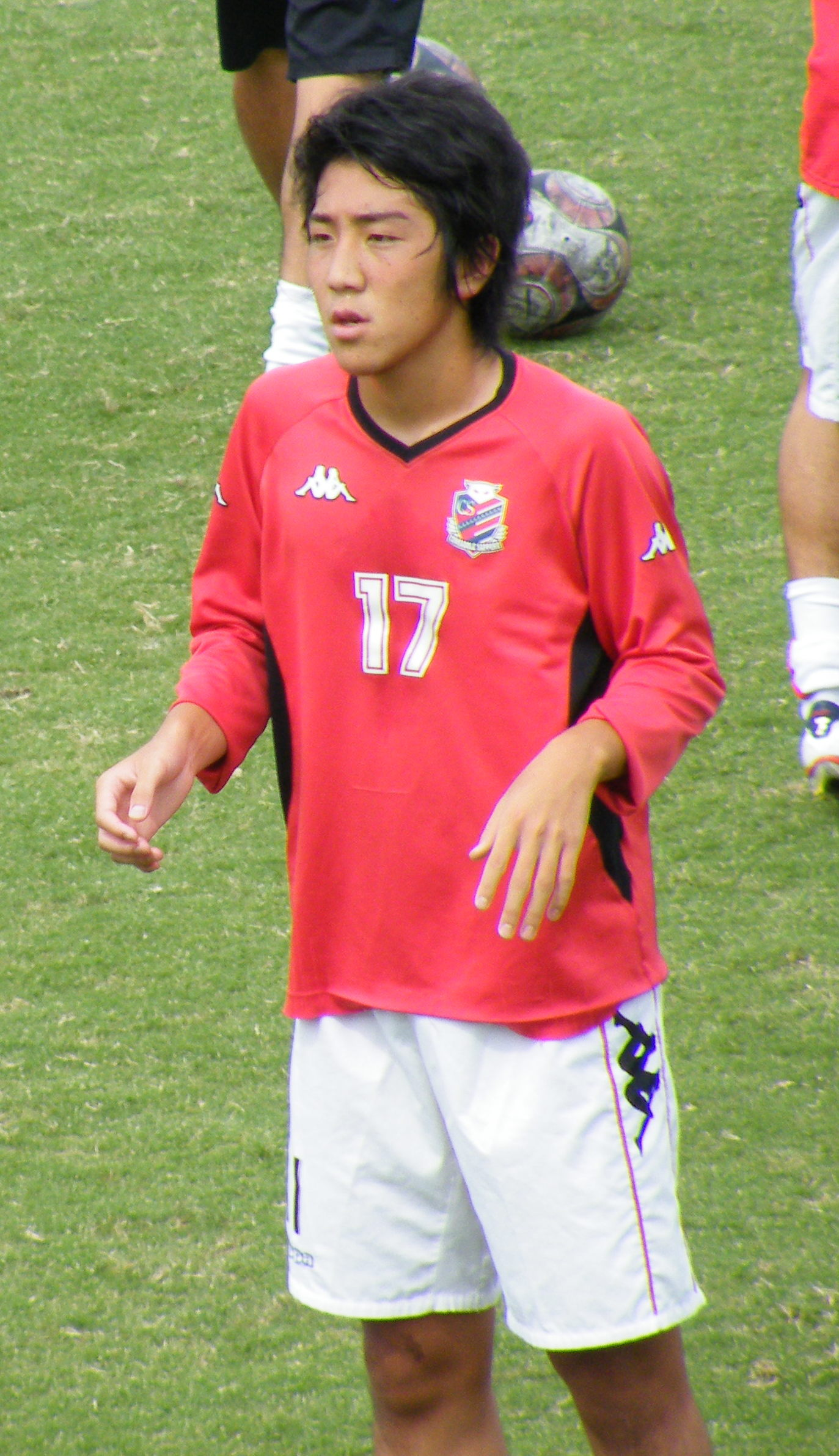

Personal information
- Full name: Yōsuke Mikami
- Date of birth: May 5, 1992 (age 34)
- Place of birth: Sapporo, Hokkaidō, Japan
- Height: 1.80 m (5 ft 11 in)
- Positions: Midfielder; forward

Youth career
- 2005–2010: Consadole Sapporo Youth

Senior career*
Years	Team	Apps	(Gls)
2010–2013	Consadole Sapporo	37	(9)
2014–2016	Kataller Toyama	71	(8)
2017–2019	Nagano Parceiro	73	(11)
2020–2023	Blaublitz Akita	86	(4)
Total		267	(32)
- * Club domestic league appearances and goals

Yōsuke Mikami (三上 陽輔, Mikami Yōsuke; born May 5, 1992) is a Japanese former footballer who played as a midfielder or forward. Mikami began his professional career with Hokkaido Consadole Sapporo in 2010 before moving to Kataller Toyama in 2014. He later joined AC Nagano Parceiro before ending his career at Blaublitz Akita. He announced his retirement at the end of the 2023 season, aged 31.

== Club statistics ==
Appearances and goals by club, season and competition
Club	Season	League			National cup (Note: Includes Emperor's Cup)		League cup (Note: Includes J.League Cup)		Total	
Club	Season	Division	Apps	Goals	Apps	Goals	Apps	Goals	Apps	Goals
Hokkaido Consadole Sapporo	2010	J.League Division 2	10	3	1	0	0	0	11	3
Hokkaido Consadole Sapporo	2011	J.League Division 2	12	2	1	0	0	0	13	2
Hokkaido Consadole Sapporo	2012	J.League Division 1	2	0	0	0	4	0	6	0
Hokkaido Consadole Sapporo	2013	J.League Division 2	13	4	1	0	0	0	14	4
Hokkaido Consadole Sapporo	Total		37	9	3	0	4	0	44	9
Kataller Toyama	2014	J.League Division 2	17	0	0	0	–		17	0
Kataller Toyama	2015	J3 League	27	2	0	0	–		27	2
Kataller Toyama	2016	J3 League	27	6	2	0	–		29	6
Kataller Toyama	Total		71	8	2	0	0	0	73	8
AC Nagano Parceiro	2017	J3 League	15	3	1	0	–		16	3
AC Nagano Parceiro	2018	J3 League	24	4	1	0	–		25	4
AC Nagano Parceiro	2019	J3 League	34	4	1	1	–		35	5
AC Nagano Parceiro	Total		73	11	3	1	0	0	76	12
Blaublitz Akita	2020	J3 League	6	0	0	0	–		6	0
Blaublitz Akita	2021	J2 League	23	1	1	0	–		24	1
Blaublitz Akita	2022	J2 League	32	1	1	0	–		33	1
Blaublitz Akita	2023	J2 League	25	2	1	0	–		26	2
Blaublitz Akita	Total		86	4	3	0	0	0	89	4
Career total			267	32	11	1	4	0	282	33

== Honours ==
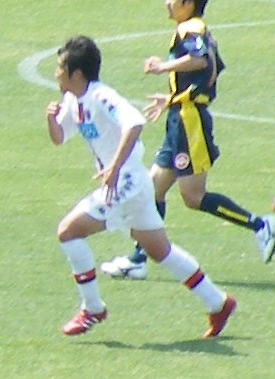
Mikami in 2010

Blaublitz Akita

- J3 League (1): 2020
