= Kento Dodate =

Japanese footballer

Kento Dodate 土館賢人
Personal information
- Full name: Kento Dodate
- Date of birth: August 23, 1992 (age 34)
- Place of birth: Kanagawa, Japan
- Height: 1.78 m (5 ft 10 in)
- Position: Midfielder

Team information
- Current team: YSCC Yokohama
- Number: 4

Youth career
- –2007: Yokohama FC
- 2008–2010: Shonan Inst. of Technology High School

College career
Years	Team	Apps	(Gls)
2011–2014	Kanto Gakuin University		

Senior career*
Years	Team	Apps	(Gls)
2016–2017	Grulla Morioka	9	(0)
2018–	YSCC Yokohama		
- * Club domestic league appearances and goals as of 23 February 2018

Kento Dodate (土館 賢人, Dodate Kento; born August 23, 1992) is a Japanese football player. He plays for YSCC Yokohama.

== Club statistics ==
Updated to 23 February 2018.

Club performance			League		Cup		Total	
Season	Club	League	Apps	Goals	Apps	Goals	Apps	Goals
Japan			League		Emperor's Cup		Total	
2016	Grulla Morioka	J3 League	5	0	0	0	5	0
2017	Grulla Morioka	J3 League	4	0	0	0	4	0
Total			9	0	0	0	9	0
