= Kazuhito Mochizuki =

Japanese footballer and manager

Kazuhito Mochizuki 望月 一仁
Personal information
- Full name: Kazuhito Mochizuki
- Date of birth: December 1, 1957 (age 68)
- Place of birth: Shizuoka, Shizuoka, Japan
- Position: Forward

Youth career
- Shizuoka Motors Technical High School

Senior career*
Years	Team	Apps	(Gls)
1977–1986	Yamaha Motors		

Managerial career
- 2001–2004: Júbilo Iwata youth
- 2005–2009: Ehime FC
- 2014: Azul Claro Numazu
- 2015–2016: Vanraure Hachinohe
- 2017–2019: Fukui United
- 2020–2021: Kamatamare Sanuki
- 2022–2023: Azul Claro Numazu
Medal record
Yamaha Motors
Winner	Emperor's Cup	1982
- * Club domestic league appearances and goals

Kazuhito Mochizuki (望月 一仁, Mochizuki Kazuhito; born December 1, 1957) is a former Japanese football player and manager.

== Playing career ==
Mochizuki was born in Shizuoka on December 1, 1957. After graduating from high school, through the club Shimizu amateur, to join the club Yamaha Motor. Aggressive defense from the front line working as a forward of flavor, also contributes to the football club won the Emperor's Cup and League One promotion in Japan. Retired from active service in 1986.

== Coaching career ==
=== Ehime FC ===
After retirement Mochizuki was appointed director of youth through Ehime FC of Yamaha Motor / Júbilo Iwata, the National Toresen coach, at that time was a member of Japan Football League in 2005. Grasp the entry of the earnest desire to play to win J1 League Japan Football League in the same year but continues to lead the Ehime FC J2 League. For the organization with a focus on player transfers rentals from other clubs, while situation team painful redone to make the player and team turnover significantly as every year, has demonstrated the ability to, such as development of young players also, strictly to fund. On the other hand, in terms of peak performance is to enter the 9-position of the first year, gradually descending. In 2008, ranked 14 out of 15 clubs booby, sluggish ranked 15 out of 18 clubs in 2009, in September of this year, was eventually dismissed by poor performance. But eventually was dismissed, the club's emerging in Ehime FC, long-term administration laid the leg rest from age five years Japan Football League, contribute to the creation of foundation of the club. Yojiro Takahagi many, such as real Suganuma, players under the guidance of Mochizuki in Ehime, became the mainstay in the original rental club, supporters trust of players were hot. Júbilo Iwata of full return to training as the person responsible generation of youth and junior youth in 2010

== Managerial statistics ==
Team	From	To	Record				
Team	From	To	G	W	D	L	Win %
Ehime FC	2006	2009	177	46	36	95	25.99
Total			177	46	36	95	25.99
