= Yukihito Kajiya =

Japanese footballer

Yukihito Kajiya 梶谷 政仁
Personal information
- Full name: Yukihito Kajiya
- Date of birth: 9 March 2000 (age 26)
- Place of birth: Saitama, Japan
- Height: 1.81 m (5 ft 11 in)
- Position: Forward

Team information
- Current team: Tokushima Vortis
- Number: 14

Youth career
- Iwaki Astron FC
- –2014: AC Asumi
- 2015–2017: Shochi Fukaya High School

College career
Years	Team	Apps	(Gls)
2018–2021	Kokushikan University SC		

Senior career*
Years	Team	Apps	(Gls)
2022–2023	Sagan Tosu	0	(0)
2023	→ Blaublitz Akita (loan)	38	(2)
2024–2025	Blaublitz Akita	69	(8)
2026–	Tokushima Vortis	17	(4)
- * Club domestic league appearances and goals as of 14 August 2026

Yukihito Kajiya (梶谷 政仁, Kajiya Yukihito; born 9 March 2000) is a Japanese footballer who plays as a forward for J2 League club Tokushima Vortis.

== Early life ==
Kajiya was born in Saitama. He played youth football for Iwaki Astron FC, AC Asumi, Shochi Fukaya High School and Kokushikan University.

== Career ==
Kajiya made his debut for Blaublitz against Thespakusatsu Gunma on 18 February 2023. He scored his first goal for the club on 22 April 2023 against V-Varen Nagasaki, scoring in the 36th minute.

== Career statistics ==
=== Club ===
As of 14 May 2026.

Appearances and goals by club, season and competition
Club	Season	League			National cup (Note: Includes Emperor Cup)		League cup (Note: Includes J.League Cup)		Total	
Club	Season	Division	Apps	Goals	Apps	Goals	Apps	Goals	Apps	Goals
Sagan Tosu	2022	J1 League	0	0	1	0	4	0	5	0
Blaublitz Akita (loan)	2023	J2 League	38	2	0	0	0	0	38	2
Blaublitz Akita	2024	J2 League	37	4	0	0	2	0	39	4
Blaublitz Akita	2025	J2 League	32	4	1	0	1	0	34	4
Blaublitz Akita	Total		69	8	1	0	3	0	73	8
Tokushima Vortis	2026	J2/J3 (100)	13	1	–		–		13	1
Career total			120	11	2	0	7	0	129	11
