= Koki Ishii =

Japanese footballer

Personal information
- Date of birth: March 15, 1995 (age 31)
- Place of birth: Shizuoka, Japan
- Height: 1.72 m (5 ft 7 1/2 in)
- Position: Midfielder

Team information
- Current team: AC Nagano Parceiro
- Number: 16

Youth career
- –2006: Sawaji SSS
- 2007–2009: Tokoha Gakuen Tachibana Junior HS
- 2010–2012: Tokoha Gakuen Tachibana HS

College career
Years	Team	Apps	(Gls)
2013–2016	Kansai University		

Senior career*
Years	Team	Apps	(Gls)
2017–2022	Gainare Tottori	108	(6)
2023–	AC Nagano Parceiro	21	(0)
- * Club domestic league appearances and goals as of 17 August 2026

Koki Ishii (石井 光輝, Ishii Kōki; born March 15, 1995) is a Japanese football player who plays for J3 League club AC Nagano Parceiro.

== Career ==
After attending Kansai University, where he also served as captain of its football team, Ishii signed with the J3 League club Gainare Tottori in December 2016, for the 2017 season.

He scored his first league goal for the club against Thespa Gunma on the 20 October 2019, scoring in the 35th minute.

== Club statistics ==
Updated to 23 August 2018.

Club performance			League		Cup		Total	
Season	Club	League	Apps	Goals	Apps	Goals	Apps	Goals
Japan			League		Emperor's Cup		Total	
2017	Gainare Tottori	J3 League	17	0	0	0	17	0
2018	Gainare Tottori	J3 League	1	0	0	0	1	0
Career total			18	0	0	0	18	0
