= Koshiro Sakamoto =

Japanese baseball player (born 1994)

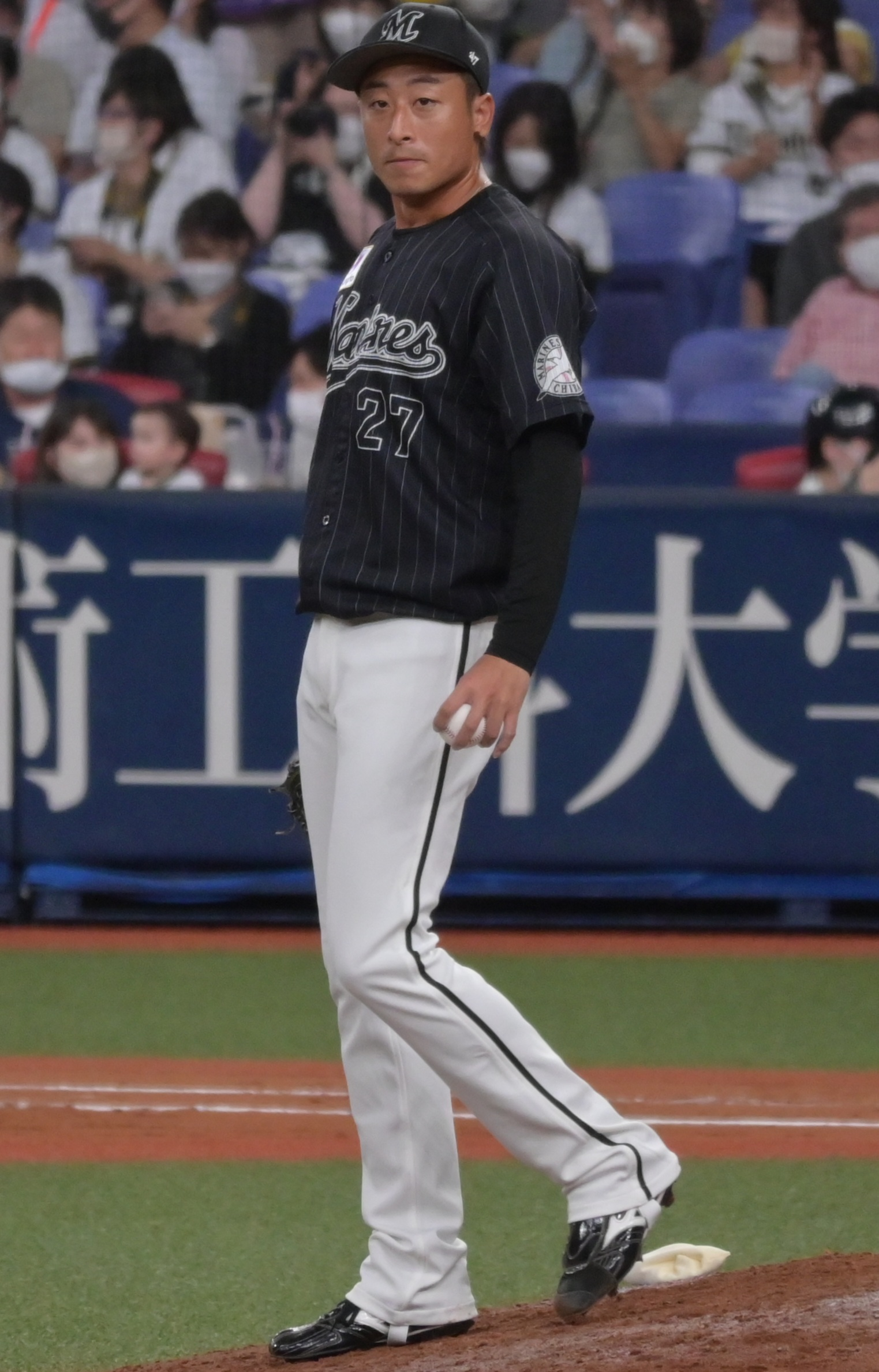
- Sakamoto in 2022

Chiba Lotte Marines – No. 36
- Pitcher
- Born: September 9, 1994 (age 31); Miyoshi, Hiroshima, Japan
- Bats: Left Throws: Left

NPB debut
- April 24, 2019, for the Tokyo Yakult Swallows

Career statistics (through 2023 season)
- Win–loss record: 2-3
- Earned Run Average: 4.68
- Strikeouts: 108
- Saves: 0
- Holds: 27
- Stats at Baseball Reference

Teams
- Tokyo Yakult Swallows (2019–2022); Chiba Lotte Marines (2022–present)

Koshiro Sakamoto (坂本 光士郎, Sakamoto Koshiro; born September 9, 1994) is a professional Japanese baseball pitcher for the Chiba Lotte Marines of Nippon Professional Baseball (NPB). He previously played in NPB for the Tokyo Yakult Swallows.

== Career ==
=== Tokyo Yakult Swallows ===
On April 24, 2019, Sakamoto made his NPB debut for the Tokyo Yakult Swallows. He played for the team through the 2022 season.

=== Chiba Lotte Marines ===
On July 28, 2022, Sakamoto was traded to the Chiba Lotte Marines in exchange for Daiki Yamamoto.
