= Naoki Sato (footballer) =

Japanese footballer

Personal information
- Date of birth: 12 July 1996 (age 30)
- Place of birth: Kanagawa, Japan
- Height: 1.72 m (5 ft 8 in)
- Position: Midfielder

Team information
- Current team: Azul Claro Numazu
- Number: 20

Youth career
- Shonan Bellmare

College career
Years	Team	Apps	(Gls)
2015–2018	Sanno Institute of Management		

Senior career*
Years	Team	Apps	(Gls)
2019–	Azul Claro Numazu	176	(13)
- * Club domestic league appearances and goals as of 1 January 2026

Naoki Sato (佐藤 尚輝, Satō Naoki; born 12 July 1996) is a Japanese footballer currently playing as a midfielder for Azul Claro Numazu of J3 League.

== Career statistics ==
=== Club ===
As of 13 November 2020.

Club	Season	League			National Cup		League Cup		Other		Total	
Club	Season	Division	Apps	Goals	Apps	Goals	Apps	Goals	Apps	Goals	Apps	Goals
Azul Claro Numazu	2019	J3 League	29	3	0	0	–		0	0	29	3
Azul Claro Numazu	2020	J3 League	23	1	0	0	–		0	0	23	1
Career total			52	4	0	0	0	0	0	0	52	4
