= Nguyễn Văn Sơn (footballer) =

Vietnamese footballer

Personal information
- Full name: Nguyễn Văn Sơn
- Date of birth: 25 February 2001 (age 25)
- Place of birth: Hanoi, Vietnam
- Height: 1.76 m (5 ft 9 in)
- Position: Forward

Team information
- Current team: Quảng Ninh
- Number: 9

Youth career
- –2021: Than Quang Ninh

Senior career*
| Years | Team | Apps | (Gls) |
| 2019–2021 | Than Quang Ninh | 3 | (0) |
| 2019 | → Cần Thơ (loan) | 14 | (0) |
| 2021–2022 | Sài Gòn | 0 | (0) |
| 2022 | → Azul Claro Numazu (loan) | 0 | (0) |
| 2023–2024 | Đồng Nai | 17 | (1) |
| 2025– | Quảng Ninh | | |
- * Club domestic league appearances and goals as of 21 April 2025

Nguyễn Văn Sơn (born 25 February 2001) is a Vietnamese professional footballer who currently plays as a forward for Quảng Ninh.

== Career statistics ==
=== Club ===
As of 4 February 2022.

| Club | Season | League | | | Cup | | Continental | | Other | | Total | |
| Club | Season | Division | Apps | Goals | Apps | Goals | Apps | Goals | Apps | Goals | Apps | Goals |
|---|---|---|---|---|---|---|---|---|---|---|---|---|
| Than Quang Ninh | 2021 | V.League 1 | 3 | 0 | 0 | 0 | – | | 0 | 0 | 3 | 0 |
| Saigon | 2022 | V.League 1 | 0 | 0 | 0 | 0 | – | | 0 | 0 | 0 | 0 |
| Azul Claro Numazu (loan) | 2022 | J3 League | 0 | 0 | 0 | 0 | – | | 0 | 0 | 0 | 0 |
| Career total | | | 3 | 0 | 0 | 0 | 0 | 0 | 0 | 0 | 3 | 0 |
