= Kōshirō Itohara =

Japanese footballer

Kōshirō Itohara 糸原 紘史郎
Personal information
- Full name: Kōshirō Itohara
- Date of birth: 25 February 1998 (age 28)
- Place of birth: Kurayoshi, Tottori, Japan
- Height: 1.86 m (6 ft 1 in)
- Position: Goalkeeper

Team information
- Current team: Renofa Yamaguchi FC
- Number: 22

Youth career
- –2012: FC Camino
- 2013–2015: Sanfrecce Hiroshima

College career
| Years | Team | Apps | (Gls) |
| 2016–2019 | Biwako Seikei Sport College | | |

Senior career*
| Years | Team | Apps | (Gls) |
| 2019–2024 | Gainare Tottori | 45 | (0) |
| 2024– | Renofa Yamaguchi | 0 | (0) |
- * Club domestic league appearances and goals as of 16 July 2024 @ 05:12(AEST)

Kōshirō Itohara (糸原 紘史郎, Itohara Kōshirō; born 25 February 1998) is a Japanese footballer currently playing as a goalkeeper for Renofa Yamaguchi FC.

== Career statistics ==
=== Club ===
As of 11 November 2021.

| Club | Season | League | | | National Cup | | League Cup | | Other | | Total | |
| Club | Season | Division | Apps | Goals | Apps | Goals | Apps | Goals | Apps | Goals | Apps | Goals |
|---|---|---|---|---|---|---|---|---|---|---|---|---|
| Gainare Tottori | 2019 | J3 League | 0 | 0 | 0 | 0 | – | | 0 | 0 | 0 | 0 |
| Gainare Tottori | 2020 | J3 League | 0 | 0 | 0 | 0 | – | | 0 | 0 | 0 | 0 |
| Gainare Tottori | 2021 | J3 League | 1 | 0 | 0 | 0 | – | | 0 | 0 | 1 | 0 |
| Career total | | | 1 | 0 | 0 | 0 | 0 | 0 | 0 | 0 | 1 | 0 |
