= Hayate Sugii =

Japanese footballer

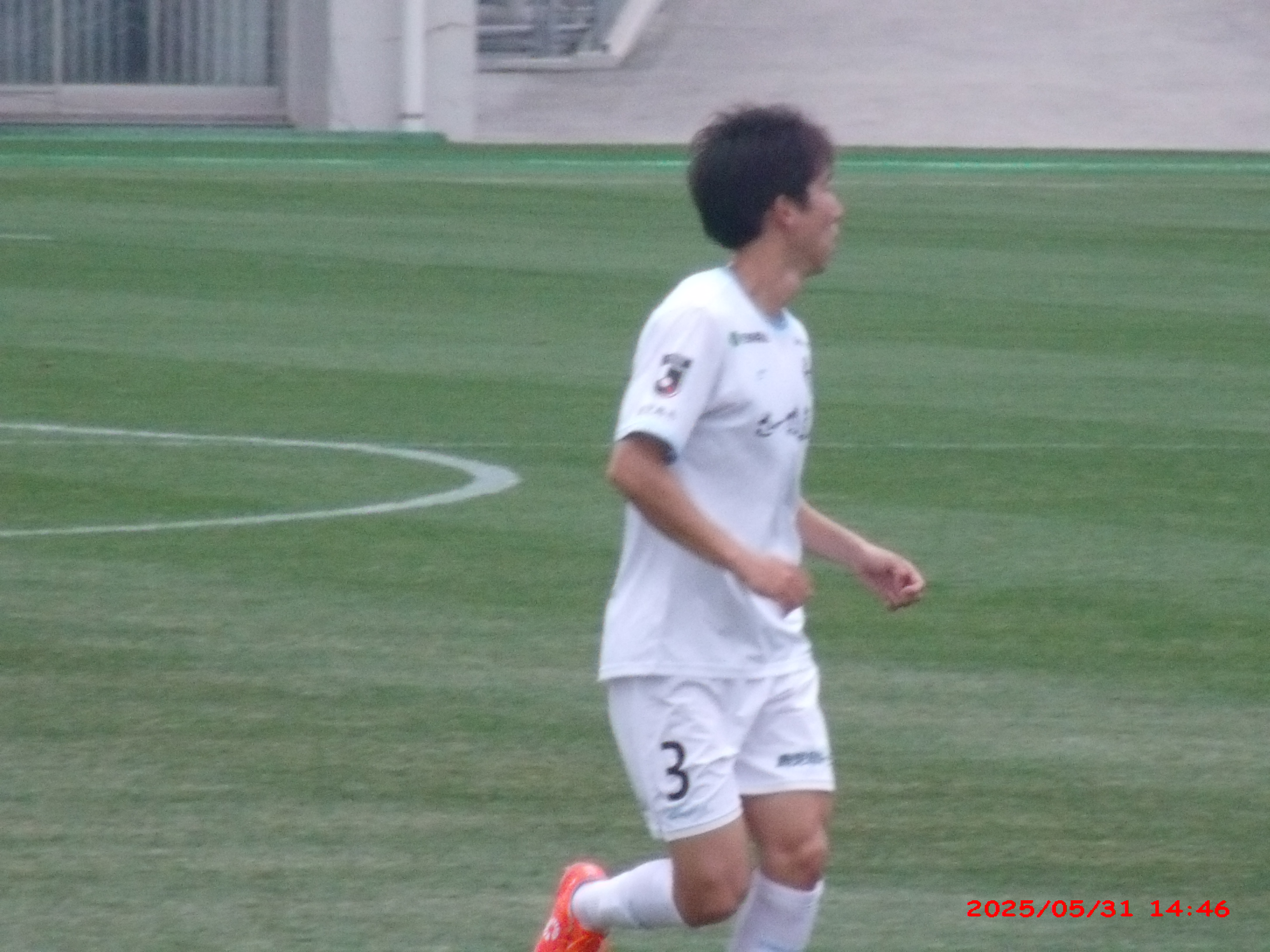

Personal information
- Date of birth: 17 May 2000 (age 26)
- Place of birth: Chiba, Japan
- Height: 1.77 m (5 ft 10 in)
- Position: Left back

Team information
- Current team: Montedio Yamagata
- Number: 5

Youth career
- Nagareyama Hayato SC
- –2012: Kashiwa Russell FC
- 2013–2018: Kashiwa Reysol

Senior career*
Years	Team	Apps	(Gls)
2019–2022	Kashiwa Reysol	2	(0)
2020	→ Zweigen Kanazawa (loan)	13	(0)
2021	→ Gainare Tottori (loan)	23	(1)
2022–2024	Nagano Parceiro	99	(3)
2025–2026	Kagoshima United	54	(4)
2026–	Montedio Yamagata	1	(0)
- * Club domestic league appearances and goals as of 13 August 2026

Hayate Sugii (杉井 颯, Sugii Hayate; born 17 May 2000) is a Japanese footballer who plays as a left back for Montedio Yamagata.

== Career ==
=== Kashiwa Reysol ===
Hayate made his debut for Kashiwa Reysol on 1 June 2019.

=== Zweigen Kanazawa ===
Hayate made his debut for Zweigen on 23 February 2020 against Fagiano Okayama.

=== Gainare Tottori ===
Hayate made his debut for Gainare Tottori on 14 March 2021. He scored his first goal for the club on 11 September 2021 in the 62nd minute.

=== Nagano Parceiro ===
Hayate made his debut for Nagano on 19 March 2022 against Fujieda MYFC.

== Career statistics ==
=== Club ===
As of 13 November 2020.

Club	Season	League			National Cup		League Cup		Other		Total	
Club	Season	Division	Apps	Goals	Apps	Goals	Apps	Goals	Apps	Goals	Apps	Goals
Kashiwa Reysol	2019	J2 League	2	0	0	0	1 (Note: Appearances in the J. League Cup)	0	0	0	3	0
Zweigen Kanazawa	2020	J2 League	12	0	0	0	0	0	0	0	12	0
Career total			15	0	0	0	1	0	0	0	16	0
