= Azul Claro Numazu =

Japanese professional football team

Azul Claro Numazu アスルクラロ沼津
- Full name: Football Club Azul Claro Numazu
- Short name: AZN
- Founded: 1990; 36 years ago as Numazu Arsenal SC
- Stadium: Shizuoka Ashitaka Athletic Stadium; Numazu, Shizuoka
- Capacity: 10,000
- Managing Organisation: Azul Claro Suruga Corporation (NPO)
- Chairman: Takehiro Takashima
- Manager: Hideto Suzuki
- League: Japan Football League
- 2025: J3 League, 20th of 20 (relegated via play-offs)
- Website: azul-claro.jp
| Home colours | Away colours |

Azul Claro Numazu (アスルクラロ沼津, Asuru Kuraro Numazu) is a Japanese professional football team based in Numazu, Shizuoka Prefecture. They are set to play in Japan Football League from 2026 to 2027, the fourth tier of Japanese football after relegation from J3 League in 2025.

== History ==
Azul Claro Numazu was established in 1977 as Numazu Arsenal and slowly progressed through the tiers of Shizuoka prefectural leagues. In 2006 the club began the process of transformation into a professional organisation with the ultimate goal of joining the J.League. The same year the club adopted its current name, Azul Claro (Meaning "light blue" in Portuguese and Spanish).

In 2012 Azul Claro won promotion to Tōkai Adult Soccer League and quickly progressed through its ranks, spending only a season in each of its divisions. Though they have finished only fourth in 2013 Tōkai League, they were considered as serious contenders for admission to the newly created J3 League. On September 17, 2013, the club has been granted the J. League Associate Membership and passed all stages of licensing and inspection by the league. However, they were only the 3rd choice club for the only Regional League spot in J3 so eventually, they had to give way to Iwate Grulla Morioka. The club has won the promotion anyway though—they were selected by the Japan Football League board as one of the teams to play in the 2014 season.

After a 3rd-place finish in the 2016 season, they were invited to play professional football from 2017 and onward, as they'll be the 14th original club in the J3 League.

On 24 October 2023, Azul Claro Numazu announced that the club was officially granted a J2 license after a decision by the J.League's Club Licensing Board.

On 14 December 2025, Azul Claro Numazu were relegated to the Japan Football League after a 1–1 draw with Reilac Shiga FC in the second leg, losing 4–3 on aggregate. This brought an end to their eight-year stay in the third tier and marked their return to the fourth tier.

== League & cup record ==
| Champions | Runners-up | Third place | Promoted | Relegated |

| League | | | | | | | | | | | | | J. League Cup | Emperor's Cup |
| Season | Division | Tier | Pos. | P | W | L | D | F | A | GD | Pts | Attendance/G | J. League Cup | Emperor's Cup |
|---|---|---|---|---|---|---|---|---|---|---|---|---|---|---|
Numazu Arsenal
| 2004 | Shizuoka Prefectural; League (Div. 2) | 7 | 4th | 11 | 6 | 0 | 5 | 33 | 24 | 9 | 18 | - | Not eligible | Did not qualify |
| 2005 | Shizuoka Prefectural; League (Div. 2) | 7 | 1st | 11 | 9 | 2 | 0 | 54 | 26 | 28 | 29 | - | Not eligible | Did not qualify |
Azul Claro Numazu
| 2006 | Shizuoka Prefectural; League (Div. 1) | 6 | 9th | 11 | 3 | 2 | 6 | 14 | 25 | -11 | 11 | - | Not eligible | Did not qualify |
| 2007 | Shizuoka Prefectural; League (Div. 1) | 6 | 11th | 11 | 3 | 1 | 7 | 11 | 27 | -16 | 10 | - | Not eligible | Did not qualify |
| 2008 | Shizuoka Prefectural; League (Div. 1) | 6 | 8th | 11 | 2 | 4 | 5 | 20 | 27 | -7 | 10 | - | Not eligible | Did not qualify |
| 2009 | Shizuoka Prefectural; League (Div. 1) | 6 | 2nd | 11 | 6 | 2 | 3 | 32 | 30 | 2 | 20 | - | Not eligible | Did not qualify |
| 2010 | Shizuoka Prefectural; League (Div. 1) | 6 | 3rd | 11 | 6 | 3 | 2 | 27 | 18 | 9 | 21 | - | Not eligible | Did not qualify |
| 2011 | Shizuoka Prefectural; League (Div. 1) | 6 | 2nd | 11 | 9 | 0 | 2 | 50 | 23 | 27 | 27 | - | Not eligible | Did not qualify |
| 2012 | Tokai Football; League (Div. 2) | 5 | 2nd | 14 | 8 | 2 | 4 | 22 | 15 | 7 | 26 | - | Not eligible | Did not qualify |
| 2013 | Tokai Football; League (Div. 1) | 4 | 4th | 14 | 8 | 1 | 5 | 20 | 21 | –1 | 25 | - | Not eligible | Did not qualify |
| 2014 | JFL | 4 | 8th | 26 | 8 | 8 | 10 | 26 | 35 | –9 | 32 | 1,777 | Not eligible | Did not qualify |
| 2015 | JFL | 4 | 5th | 30 | 16 | 6 | 8 | 36 | 28 | 8 | 54 | 2,198 | Not eligible | Did not qualify |
| 2016 | JFL | 4 | 3rd | 30 | 18 | 5 | 7 | 47 | 24 | 23 | 59 | 2,332 | Not eligible | Did not qualify |
| 2017 | J3 | 3 | 3rd | 32 | 16 | 11 | 5 | 60 | 27 | 33 | 59 | 3,029 | Not eligible | 3rd round |
| 2018 | J3 | 3 | 4th | 32 | 14 | 10 | 8 | 40 | 29 | 11 | 52 | 2,857 | Not eligible | Did not qualify |
| 2019 | J3 | 3 | 12th | 34 | 11 | 6 | 17 | 35 | 43 | –8 | 39 | 2,470 | Not eligible | Did not qualify |
| 2020 † | J3 | 3 | 12th | 34 | 12 | 5 | 17 | 36 | 40 | –4 | 41 | 925 | Not eligible | Did not qualify |
| 2021 † | J3 | 3 | 14th | 28 | 7 | 6 | 15 | 32 | 44 | –12 | 27 | 1,482 | Not eligible | Did not qualify |
| 2022 | J3 | 3 | 15th | 34 | 8 | 7 | 19 | 27 | 46 | -19 | 31 | 1,684 | Not eligible | Did not qualify |
| 2023 | J3 | 3 | 13th | 38 | 15 | 6 | 17 | 48 | 48 | 0 | 51 | 1,961 | Not eligible | 1st round |
| 2024 | J3 | 3 | 10th | 38 | 15 | 7 | 16 | 53 | 46 | 7 | 52 | 2,633 | 2nd round | 1st round |
| 2025 | J3 | 3 | 20th | 38 | 6 | 10 | 22 | 40 | 57 | -17 | 28 | 3,417 | 1st round | Did not qualify |
| 2026–27 | JFL | 4 | TBD | 30 | | | | | | | | | Not eligible | TBD |

Key

- Pos. = Position in league; P = Games played; W = Games won; D = Games drawn; L = Games lost; F = Goals scored; A = Goals conceded; GD = Goals difference; Pts = Points gained
- Attendance/G = Average home league attendance
- † 2020 & 2021 seasons attendances reduced by COVID-19 worldwide pandemic
- Source: J.League Data Site

== Honours ==
Azul Claro Numazu Honours
| Honour | No. | Years |
|---|---|---|
| Shizuoka Prefectural League (Div. 2) | 1 | 2005 |
| Shizuoka Prefectural Football Championship (and Emperor's Cup Shizuoka Prefectural Qualifiers) | 3 | 2017, 2023 & 2024 |

== Players ==
=== Current squad ===
As of 22 August 2025.

Note: Flags indicate national team as defined under FIFA eligibility rules; some limited exceptions apply. Players may hold more than one non-FIFA nationality.

| No. | Pos. | Nation | Player |
|---|---|---|---|
| 1 | GK | JPN | Kenta Watanabe |
| 2 | DF | JPN | Shigeo Miyawaki |
| 3 | DF | BRA | Lucas Sena |
| 4 | DF | BRA | Gustavo Rissi |
| 5 | DF | JPN | Terukazu Shinozaki |
| 6 | MF | JPN | Haruki Toyama |
| 7 | MF | JPN | Kosei Numata |
| 8 | MF | JPN | Kenshiro Suzuki |
| 9 | FW | JPN | Wadi Ibrahim Suzuki (on loan from Tokushima Vortis) |
| 10 | MF | JPN | Naoki Sato |
| 11 | MF | JPN | Yuma Mori |
| 13 | MF | JPN | Kakeru Watai |
| 14 | MF | JPN | Kotaro Tokunaga |
| 15 | DF | JPN | Yuta Nakamura |
| 16 | DF | JPN | Shuma Mihara |
| 17 | MF | JPN | Kengo Fujii |
| 18 | MF | JPN | Takuya Sugai |
| 19 | MF | JPN | Manabu Saito |
| 20 | FW | JPN | Kengo Kawamata |

| No. | Pos. | Nation | Player |
|---|---|---|---|
| 21 | GK | JPN | Hiroto Maeda |
| 22 | DF | JPN | Daichi Ichimaru |
| 23 | FW | JPN | Keita Shirawachi (on loan from Iwaki FC) |
| 24 | MF | JPN | Kaiyo Yanagimachi |
| 26 | DF | JPN | Ryuji Ide |
| 27 | MF | JPN | Yusuke Kawamura |
| 28 | DF | JPN | Koki Inoue |
| 29 | FW | BRA | Weverton (on loan from Júbilo Iwata) |
| 30 | GK | GER | Guirone Gueguim |
| 34 | DF | JPN | Kaito Miyazaki (on loan from Roasso Kumamoto) |
| 35 | MF | JPN | Hinata Mukai |
| 37 | MF | JPN | Haruto Nakano ^{Type 2} |
| 38 | DF | JPN | Daichi Katsumata ^{Type 2} |
| 39 | MF | JPN | Nagi Sugiyama ^{Type 2} |
| 44 | GK | JPN | Koji Yamada |
| 46 | MF | JPN | Keigo Iwasaki |
| 71 | MF | JPN | Ryohei Watanabe (on loan from Sagan Tosu) |
| 77 | DF | ESP | Enric Martínez |
| 99 | FW | BRA | Mikhael Akatsuka |

=== Out on loan ===
Note: Flags indicate national team as defined under FIFA eligibility rules; some limited exceptions apply. Players may hold more than one non-FIFA nationality.

| No. | Pos. | Nation | Player |
|---|---|---|---|
| 31 | GK | JPN | Shunkun Tani (at (Chinese Taipei) Vikings) |

== Club officials ==
| Position | Name |
|---|---|
| Head coach | (Japan) Masashi Nakayama |
| Assistant coach | (Japan) Hideto Suzuki (Japan) Daiki Tajiri |
| Transition coach | (Japan) Keita Goto |
| Coach and interpreter | (Brazil) Landow Takai |
| Goalkeeper coach | (Japan) Yukio Takeda |
| Physical coach | (Japan) Yoshiki Hirano |
| Doctor | (Japan) Shunsuke Mukoyama |
| Trainer | (Japan) Takuya Kawasaki (Japan) Kentaro Taki (Japan) Takashi Tanaka |
| Manager | (Japan) Daiki Ito |

== Managerial history ==
| Manager | Nationality | Tenure | |
| Manager | Nationality | Start | Finish |
|---|---|---|---|
| Kazuhito Mochizuki | Japan | 1 February 2014 | 31 January 2015 |
| Ken Yoshida | Japan | 1 February 2015 | 31 January 2020 |
| Masataka Imai | Japan | 1 February 2020 | 23 August 2022 |
| Kazuhito Mochizuki | Japan | 24 August 2022 | 31 January 2023 |
| Masashi Nakayama | Japan | 1 February 2023 | 14 September 2025 |
| Hideto Suzuki | Japan | 14 September 2025 | |

== Kit evolution ==
Home kit - 1st
| 2014 | 2015 | 2016 | 2017 | 2018 |
| 2019 | 2020 | 2021 | 2022 | 2023 |
| 2024 | 2025 - | | | |

Away kit - 2nd
| 2014 | 2015 | 2016 | 2017 | 2018 |
| 2019 | 2020 | 2021 | 2022 | 2023 |
| 2024 | 2025 - | | | |

Other kit - 3rd
| 2021; 30th Anniversary; Memorial | 2022; Love Live! Sunshine!! edition | 2023; Love Live! Sunshine!! edition | 2024; Love Live! Sunshine!! edition |

== Colour, sponsors and manufacturers ==
| Season(s) | Main Shirt Sponsor | Collarbone Sponsor | | Additional Sponsor(s) | | | | Kit Manufacturer |
|---|---|---|---|---|---|---|---|---|
| 2013 | SURUGA bank | – | – | – | – | NNH | – | (Germany) Puma |
| 2014 | SURUGA bank | – | – | USUi | – | MEIDEN | 雄大 | (Germany) Puma |
| 2015 | USUi | – | – | SURUGA Bank | – | – | MEIDEN | (Germany) Puma |
| 2016 | USUi | – | – | SURUGA Bank | – | MEIDEN | – | (Germany) Puma |
| 2017 | USUi | – | – | SURUGA Bank | – | MEIDEN | – | (Germany) Puma |
| 2018 | USUi | Kawata Construction (Left) | Kawata Construction (Right) | SURUGA Bank | – | MEIDEN | – | (Germany) Puma |
| 2019 | USUi | Kawata Construction (Left) | Kawata Construction (Right) | SURUGA Bank | – | MEIDEN | – | (Germany) Puma |
| 2020 | USUi | MEIDEN (Left) | MEIDEN (Right) | SURUGA Bank | – | Kawata Construction | – | (Germany) Puma |
