= Koshiro Yamamuro =

Japanese baseball player

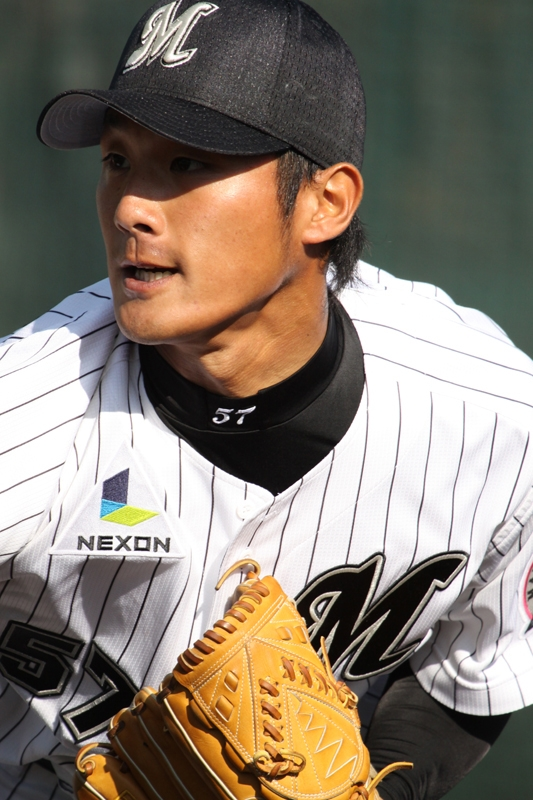
- Pitcher
- Born: July 14, 1987 (age 38); Seya-ku, Yokohama, Kanagawa, Japan
- Bats: Left Throws: Right

NPB debut
- 2010, for the Chiba Lotte Marines

NPB statistics (through 2010)
- Games pitched: 1
- Innings pitched: 2.0
- Strikeouts: 0
- Stats at Baseball Reference

Teams
- Chiba Lotte Marines (2010)

Koshiro Yamamuro (山室 公志郎, born July 14, 1987) is a Japanese former professional baseball pitcher. He played with the Chiba Lotte Marines in Japan's Nippon Professional Baseball in 2010.
