= 2024 J3 League =

11th season of J3 League

J3 League
- Season: 2024
- Dates: 24 February 2024 – 7 December 2024
- Champions: Omiya Ardija; 1st title
- Promoted: Omiya Ardija; FC Imabari; Kataller Toyama
- Relegated: YSCC Yokohama; Iwate Grulla Morioka
- Matches: 380
- Goals: 985 (2.59 per match)
- Top goalscorer: Marcus Índio; Kosuke Fujioka (19 goals)
- Biggest home win: Fukushima United 9-0 Iwate Grulla Morioka (28 April 2024)
- Biggest away win: Iwate Grulla Morioka 0–6 FC Gifu (20 October 2024)
- Highest scoring: Fukushima United 9-0 Iwate Grulla Morioka (28 April 2024); Omiya Ardija 5-4 Gainare Tottori (2 November 2024)
- Highest attendance: 14,411; Matsumoto Yamaga 1–1 Nagano Parceiro (29 June)
- Lowest attendance: 515; Iwate Grulla Morioka 2–1 Nara Club (10 April)
- Total attendance: 1,283,794
- Average attendance: 3,378
- All statistics correct as of 10:00, 24 November 2024 (UTC).

The 2024 J3 League, also known as the 2024 Meiji Yasuda J3 League (2024 明治安田J3リーグ, 2024 Meiji Yasuda J3 Rīgu) for sponsorship reasons, was the 11th season of the J3 League, the third-tier Japanese professional league for association football clubs, since its establishment in 2013.

== Overview ==
The league continued with 20 teams for the 2024 season.

The top two teams in the league will be automatically promoted to the J2 League, provided they have the necessary license. The 2024 season introduces a promotion play-offs, where one of the teams ranked 3rd to 6th will also be promoted. As of September 2024, all clubs in the league now hold a valid J2 license, following FC Osaka being the final club to be granted one.

There is the possibility that as many as two clubs will be relegated to the Japan Football League. Promotion from the JFL is conditional on holding a valid J3 license. If the JFL champions hold a license, the club will be automatically promoted and the J3's 20th-placed team will be automatically relegated. If the JFL runners-up hold a license, the club will need to play promotion/relegation play-offs against J3's 19th or 20th-placed team for the season, depending on whether the JFL champions hold the J3 license. The club(s) who do not hold a license cannot be promoted and no teams will be relegated from the J3 League.

== Schedule ==
The league and match format was announced on 19 December 2023. The league began on 23 February and ended on 10 November in a round-robin format of 38 matches.

The J3 promotion play-offs were held in a similar manner to the J2 playoffs, with the semi-finals on 1 December with the final taking place on 7 December.

== Changes from the previous season ==
Zweigen Kanazawa and Omiya Ardija were relegated to the J3 League, finishing the previous J2 League season as 21st and 22nd-placed teams, respectively. Zweigen Kanazawa are returning to the J3 League after nine seasons in the second-tier. Omiya Ardija will be competing in the third-tier for the first time as a J.League member.

No teams were relegated from the 2023 J3 League. This is only the second time in J3 history that there will be no new clubs promoted from the JFL.

J3 winners Ehime FC and runners-up Kagoshima United were both promoted from the 2023 season.

== Clubs ==
Locations of the 2024 J3 League teams

Club name	Home town	Stadium	Capacity	Last season	Licence
Azul Claro Numazu	Numazu	Ashitaka Stadium	5,104	J3 (13th)	J2
Fukushima United	Fukushima	Toho Stadium	5,710	J3 (15th)	J1
Gainare Tottori	All cities/towns in Tottori (Note: centering on Tottori, Yonago, Kurayoshi, Sakaiminato)	Axis Bird Stadium	11,999	J3 (6th)	J2
FC Gifu	All cities/towns in Gifu (Note: centering on Gifu)	Gifu Nagaragawa Stadium	16,310	J3 (8th)	J1
Giravanz Kitakyushu	Kitakyushu, Fukuoka	Mikuni World Stadium Kitakyushu	15,066	J3 (20th)	J1
FC Imabari	Imabari	ASICS Satoyama Stadium	5,316	J3 (4th)	J2
Iwate Grulla Morioka	All cities/towns in Iwate	Iwagin Stadium & Kitakami Stadium	5,046	J3 (10th)	J1
Kamatamare Sanuki	All cities/towns in Kagawa (Note: centering on Takamatsu, Marugame)	Pikara Stadium	22,338	J3 (16th)	J1
Kataller Toyama	All cities/towns in Toyama (Note: centering on Toyama)	Toyama Athletic Stadium	18,588	J3 (3rd)	J1
Matsumoto Yamaga	Cities/towns in Nagano (Note: Matsumoto, Azumino, Yamagata, Shiojiri, Omachi, Ikeda, Ikusaka, Minowa, Asahi)	Sunpro Alwin	20,336	J3 (9th)	J1
Nagano Parceiro	Nagano	Nagano U Stadium	15,491	J3 (14th)	J2
Nara Club	All cities/towns on Nara	Rohto Field Nara	5,369	J3 (5th)	J2
Omiya Ardija	Saitama, Saitama	NACK5 Stadium Omiya	15,491	J2 (21st; Relegated)	J1
FC Osaka	Higashiōsaka, Osaka	Hanazono Rugby Stadium	26,443	J3 (11th)	J3
FC Ryukyu	All cities/towns in Okinawa	Tapic Kenso Hiyagon Stadium	10,189	J3 (17th)	J1
SC Sagamihara	Sagamihara	Gion Stadium	11,808	J3 (18th)	J2
Tegevajaro Miyazaki	Miyazaki & Shintomi, Miyazaki	Unilever Stadium Shintomi	5,357	J3 (19th)	J2
Vanraure Hachinohe	Eastern cities/towns in Aomori (Note: Hachinohe, Towada, Gonohe, Sannohe, Takko, Hashikami, Nanbu, Shingo, Oirase, Misawa, Shichinohe, Rokunohe, Tohoku, Noheji, Yokohama, Rokkasho)	Prifoods Stadium	5,124	J3 (7th)	J2
YSCC Yokohama	Yokohama	Nippatsu Mitsuzawa Stadium	15,442	J3 (12th)	J2
Zweigen Kanazawa	All cities/towns in Ishikawa (Note: centering on Kanazawa, Nonoichi, Kahoku, Tsubata, Tsubata)	Ishikawa Kanazawa Stadium	10,728	J2 (22nd; Relegated)	J1

=== Personnel and kits ===
Club	Manager	Captain	Kit manufacturer	Main shirt sponsor
Azul Claro Numazu	(Japan) Masashi Nakayama	(Japan) Takuya Sugai	(Brazil) Penalty	Usui
Fukushima United	(Japan) Shuhei Terada	(Japan) Kaito Yamamoto	(Denmark) Hummel	Toho Bank
Gainare Tottori	(Japan) Kentaro Hayashi	(Japan) Hiroto Sese	(Japan) Soccer Junky	San-in Godo Bank
FC Gifu	(Japan) Kenichi Amano	(Japan) Yoshihiro Shoji	(Japan) Razzoli	Hot Staff
Giravanz Kitakyushu	(Japan) Kohei Masumoto	(Japan) Haruki Izawa	(England) Umbro	TOTO
FC Imabari	(Japan) Toshihiro Hattori	(Japan) Keishi Kusumi	(Japan) Asics	Unicharm
Iwate Grulla Morioka	(Japan) Kei Hoshikawa	(Japan) Atsutaka Nakamura	(Spain) Kelme	Nova
Kamatamare Sanuki	(Japan) Atsushi Yoneyama		(Japan) Angua	Rexxam
Kataller Toyama	(Japan) Michiharu Otagiri	(Japan) Kosei Wakimoto	(Japan) Goldwin	YKK AP
Matsumoto Yamaga	(Japan) Masahiro Shimoda	(Japan) Akira Ando	(Germany) Adidas	Epson
Nagano Parceiro	(Japan) Riki Takagi	(Japan) Takuya Akiyama	(Brazil) Penalty	Hokto
Nara Club	(Japan) Ichizo Nakata	(Japan) Yuki Kotani	(Japan) Squadra	Daiwa House
Omiya Ardija	(Japan) Tetsu Nagasawa	(Japan) Yutaro Hakamata	(United States) Under Armour	NTT Docomo
FC Osaka	(Japan) Naoto Otake	(Japan) Shusuke Sakamoto	(Japan) bonera	Tobu Top Tours
FC Ryukyu	(North Korea) Kim Jong-song	(Japan) Ryunosuke Noda	(Japan) sfida	GMO Coin
SC Sagamihara	(Germany) Yuki Richard Stalph	(Japan) Akihiko Takeshige	(England) Umbro	Gion
Tegevajaro Miyazaki	(Japan) Yuji Okuma	(Japan) Hikaru Manabe	(Japan) Yonex	Enatsu Shoji Holdings
Vanraure Hachinohe	(Japan) Nobuhiro Ishizaki	(Japan) Naoyuki Yamada	(Denmark) Hummel	ATMIX
YSCC Yokohama	(Japan) Kazuki Kuranuki	(Japan) Kento Dodate	(Japan) Bonera	Sanshin
Zweigen Kanazawa	(Japan) Akira Ito	(Japan) Yuto Shirai	(Denmark) Hummel	12

=== Managerial changes ===
Team	Outgoing manager	Manner of departure	Date of vacancy	Position in the table	Incoming manager	Date of appointment	Ref.
Zweigen Kanazawa	(Japan) Masaaki Yanagishita	End of contract	5 November 2023	Pre-season	(Japan) Akira Ito	11 December 2023	
Giravanz Kitakyushu	(Japan) Shinji Kobayashi	Resigned	22 November 2023	Pre-season	(Japan) Kohei Masumoto	15 December 2023	
Gainare Tottori	(Japan) Kohei Matsumoto (interim)	End of interim spell	24 November 2023	Pre-season	(Japan) Kentaro Hayashi	8 December 2023	
Fukushima United	(Japan) Mitsumasa Yoda	Resigned	27 November 2023	Pre-season	(Japan) Shuhei Terada	13 December 2023	
FC Osaka	(Japan) Ryo Shigaki	Signed by Renofa Yamaguchi	5 December 2023	Pre-season	(Japan) Naoto Otake	18 December 2023	
Tegevajaro Miyazaki	(Japan) Mitsuo Kato	Resigned	5 December 2023	Pre-season	(Japan) Yuji Okuma	19 December 2023	
Omiya Ardija	(Japan) Masato Harasaki	Resigned	9 November 2023	Pre-season	(Japan) Tetsu Nagasawa	11 December 2023	
FC Imabari	(Japan) Naoto Kudo	Resigned	10 December 2023	Pre-season	(Japan) Toshihiro Hattori	11 December 2023	
Iwate Grulla Morioka	(Japan) Tetsuji Nakamikawa	Management restructure	8 May 2024	20th	(Japan) Takuya Jinno	8 May 2024	
SC Sagamihara	(Japan) Kazuyuki Toda	Contract terminated	19 June 2024	9th	(Germany) Yuki Richard Stalph	26 June 2024	
FC Gifu	(Japan) Yusaku Ueno	Resigned	27 June 2024	11th	(Japan) Kenichi Amano	28 June 2024 (interim); 30 September 2024 (full)	
Iwate Grulla Morioka	(Japan) Takuya Jinno	Contract terminated	18 August 2024	20th	(Japan) Kei Hoshikawa	18 August 2024	
Nara Club	(Spain) Julián Marín	Contract terminated	4 September 2024	18th	(Japan) Ichizo Nakata	4 September 2024	

== Foreign players ==
From the 2021 season onwards, there is no limitations on signing foreign players, but clubs could only register up to five of them for a single matchday squad. Players from J.League partner nations (Thailand, Vietnam, Myanmar, Malaysia, Cambodia, Singapore, Indonesia, and Qatar) were exempted from these restrictions.

- Players name in **bold** indicates the player is registered during the summer transfer window.
- Player's name in italics indicates the player has Japanese nationality in addition to their FIFA nationality, holds the nationality of a J.League partner nation, or is exempt from being treated as a foreign player due to having been born in Japan and being enrolled in, or having graduated from an approved type of school in the country.

Club	Player 1	Player 2	Player 3	Player 4	Player 5	Player 6	Player 7	Player 8	Player 9	Former players
Azul Claro Numazu	(Brazil) Gustavo Rissi									
Fukushima United										
Gainare Tottori										
FC Gifu	(North Korea) Mun In-ju	(South Korea) Lee Yong-jae								
Giravanz Kitakyushu	(South Korea) Koh Seung-jin									
FC Imabari	(Argentina) Tomás Moschión	(Brazil) Marcus Índio	(Brazil) Rodrigo Angelotti	(Brazil) **Wesley Tanque**	(Spain) Jon Ander Serantes					(China) Ning Fangze
Iwate Grulla Morioka	(Brazil) **Sillas**	(Nigeria) Kenneth Otabor	(North Korea) Ryu Se-gun	(South Korea) Kim Jae-young	(South Korea) Kim Sung-kon	(South Korea) Lee Byung-chan				
Kamatamare Sanuki	(Hong Kong) **Au Yeung Yiu Chung**									
Kataller Toyama	(Brazil) Gabriel Nascimento	(Brazil) Matheus Leiria								
Matsumoto Yamaga	(Spain) Víctor Ibáñez									
Nagano Parceiro	(Indonesia) Ryu Nugraha	(South Korea) Kim Min-ho	(South Korea) Lee Seung-won	(South Korea) Park Soo-bin						
Nara Club	(Spain) Marc Vito	(Thailand) Patrik Gustavsson								(Thailand) Kiadtiphon Udom
Omiya Ardija	(Brazil) Arthur Silva	(Colombia) **Fabián González**	(Nigeria) **Oriola Sunday**							(Poland) Jakub Świerczok
FC Osaka	(Australia) **Jonas Markovski**	(Brazil) **Everton Kanela**	(Brazil) **João Moura**	(Malaysia) **Muhammad Khalil**	(South Korea) **Cho Young-kwang**	(South Korea) Choi Young-hoon	(South Korea) **Ji Seong-min**	(South Korea) Kang Seong-kook	(South Korea) Woo Sang-ho	(Brazil) Efrain Rintaro
FC Ryukyu	(South Korea) Cho Eun-su	(South Korea) Jeon Ji-wan	(South Korea) **Noh Seung-ki**	(South Korea) Park Seong-su						
SC Sagamihara										(Brazil) Bruno Santos (Brazil) Fabrício Baiano (Brazil) Ryan
Tegevajaro Miyazaki										
Vanraure Hachinohe										
YSCC Yokohama	(Canada) Shawn van Eerden	(Denmark) Jorn Pedersen	(Malaysia) Luqman Hakim Shamsudin	(Nigeria) Onye Ogochukwu						
Zweigen Kanazawa	(Brazil) Jefferson Baiano	(Brazil) Marlyson	(South Korea) Baek In-hwan							

== League table ==
Pos	Team	Pld	W	D	L	GF	GA	GD	Pts	Promotion or relegation
1	Omiya Ardija (C, P)	38	25	10	3	72	32	+40	85	Promotion to the 2025 J2 League
2	FC Imabari (P)	38	22	7	9	62	38	+24	73	Promotion to the 2025 J2 League
3	Kataller Toyama (O, P)	38	16	16	6	54	36	+18	64	Qualification for the promotion play-offs
4	Matsumoto Yamaga	38	16	12	10	61	45	+16	60	Qualification for the promotion play-offs
5	Fukushima United	38	18	5	15	64	49	+15	59	Qualification for the promotion play-offs
6	FC Osaka	38	15	13	10	43	31	+12	58	Qualification for the promotion play-offs
7	Giravanz Kitakyushu	38	15	11	12	41	39	+2	56	
8	FC Gifu	38	15	8	15	64	56	+8	53	
9	SC Sagamihara	38	14	11	13	41	41	0	53	
10	Azul Claro Numazu	38	15	7	16	53	46	+7	52	
11	Vanraure Hachinohe	38	13	13	12	44	42	+2	52	
12	Zweigen Kanazawa	38	13	11	14	50	52	−2	50	
13	Gainare Tottori	38	14	8	16	49	65	−16	50	
14	FC Ryukyu	38	12	11	15	45	54	−9	47	
15	Tegevajaro Miyazaki	38	12	10	16	46	50	−4	46	
16	Kamatamare Sanuki	38	10	13	15	48	52	−4	43	
17	Nara Club	38	7	18	13	43	56	−13	39	
18	Nagano Parceiro	38	7	16	15	44	57	−13	37	
19	YSCC Yokohama (R)	38	7	11	20	34	64	−30	32	Qualification for the relegation/promotion play-offs
20	Iwate Grulla Morioka (R)	38	5	7	26	27	80	−53	22	Relegation to the 2025 JFL

Source: Meiji Yasuda J3 League, J.League Data Site
Rules for classification: 1) Points; 2) Goal difference; 3) Goals scored; 4) Head-to-head points; 5) Head-to-head goal difference; 6) Head-to-head goal scored; 7) Fair-play points.
(C) Champions; (O) Play-off winners; (P) Promoted; (R) Relegated

== Play-offs ==
=== Promotion play-offs ===
The usual format will be applied in the 2024 season. Promotion play-offs, officially called the 2024 J.League Road To J2 Play-offs (Note: On the official J.League English website, it is listed as J2 Promotion Play-Offs) (Japanese: 2024 J2昇格プレーオフ), was held from the semi-finals, where the match-ups were previously semi-determined. Based on the J3 placements at the end of the regular season, the third-placed team played against the sixth-placed, while the fourth-placed team played against the fifth-placed. The winners of the semi-finals played the final, with the winners promoted to the J2.

If a match was tied in the play-offs, the team with the highest league position are declared the winner. The rank order was: J3's third, fourth, fifth, and sixth-placed teams.

Semi-finals
3	Kataller Toyama	1
6	FC Osaka	1
4	Matsumoto Yamaga	1
5	Fukushima United	1

Final
3	Kataller Toyama	2
4	Matsumoto Yamaga	2

=== Semi-finals ===
1 December 2024
14:00 JST

Kataller Toyama	1–1	FC Osaka
Fuseya 36'	Report	Masuda 45+3'

Toyama Stadium, Toyama
Attendance: 5,101
Referee: Yuzo Sutani

In case of a tie, the team with the higher league position (Kataller Toyama) goes through to the play-off final.

1 December 2024
14:00 JST

Matsumoto Yamaga	1–1	Fukushima United
Nonomura 65'	Report	Higuchi 10'

Sunpro Alwin, Nagano
Attendance: 12,604
Referee: Yusuke Ohashi

In case of a tie, the team with the higher league position (Matsumoto Yamaga) goes through to the play-off final.

=== Final ===
7 December 2024
14:00 JST

Kataller Toyama	2–2	Matsumoto Yamaga
Usui 79', 90+3'	Report	Yasunaga 18'; Higuchi 26'

Toyama Stadium, Toyama
Attendance: 11,847
Referee: Koki Nagamine

In case of a tie, the team with the higher league position (Kataller Toyama) got promoted to J2 League.

=== Relegation play-offs ===
The relegation play-offs, officially called the 2024 J3/JFL Play-Offs (Japanese: 2024 J3・JFL入れ替え戦 (Note: The logo and signage reads 2024 J.League J3・JFL入れ替え戦)), take place on 1 and 7 December 2024. If two teams are equal on the scoreboard, the match will going to extra time and penalty shoot-out. Away goals rule will not applied.

=== Overview ===
Team 1	Agg.	Team 2	1st leg	2nd leg
YSCC Yokohama (J3)	1–3	Kochi United (JFL)	1–1	0–2

=== Matches ===
1 December 2024
13:00 JST

Kochi United	1–1	YSCC Yokohama
Kozuki 33'	Report	Fujita 5'

Pikara Stadium, Kagawa
Attendance: 3,056
Referee: Tomohiro Inoue
7 December 2024
15:00 JST

YSCC Yokohama	0–2	Kochi United
	Report	Shintani 7', Uchida 90+1'

Mitsuzawa Stadium, Yokohama
Attendance: 5,101
Referee: Naoto Uehara

Kochi United SC won the J3/JFL play-offs on aggregate 3-1 and got promoted to J3, while YSCC Yokohama lost the play-offs and got relegated to JFL.

== Season statistics ==
=== Top scorers ===
As of 24 November 2024.

Rank	Player	Club	Goals
1	(Brazil) Marcus Índio	FC Imabari	19
1	(Japan) Kosuke Fujioka	FC Gifu	19
3	(Japan) Ryo Shiohama	Fukushima United	16
4	(Japan) Ryo Nagai	Giravanz Kitakyushu	14
5	(Japan) Hayato Asakawa	Matsumoto Yamaga	13
5	(Japan) Kensei Ukita	Nagano Parceiro	13
5	(Japan) Yuki Okada	Nara Club	13
8	(Japan) Keigo Hashimoto	Tegevajaro Miyazaki	12
8	(Japan) Yu Tomidokoro	FC Ryukyu	12
8	(Japan) Yuya Taguchi	Zweigen Kanazawa	12

== Awards ==
=== Monthly awards ===
Month	Manager of the Month		Monthly MVP		Goal of the Month		Young Player of the Month		References
Month	Manager	Club	Player	Club	Player	Club	Player	Club	References
February/March	(Japan) Yusaku Ueno	FC Gifu	(Japan) Kosuke Fujioka	FC Gifu	(Japan) Yumeki Yokoyama	FC Imabari	(Japan) Rion Ichihara	Omiya Ardija	
April	(Japan) Tetsu Nagasawa	Omiya Ardija	(Japan) Hagumi Wada	Azul Claro Numazu	(Japan) Genta Ito	FC Imabari	(Japan) Yuto Ozeki	Fukushima United	
May	(Japan) Shuhei Terada	Fukushima United	(Japan) Yu Tomidokoro	FC Ryukyu	(Japan) Yu Tomidokoro	FC Ryukyu	(Japan) Yuki Kajiura	Zweigen Kanazawa	
June	(Japan) Kohei Masumoto	Giravanz Kitakyushu	(Brazil) Arthur Silva	Omiya Ardija	(Japan) Keisuke Ito	SC Sagamihara	(Japan) Kosei Okazawa	FC Ryukyu	
July	(Japan) Toshihiro Hattori	FC Imabari	(Japan) Ryo Nagai	Giravanz Kitakyushu	(Japan) Takuya Sugai	Azul Claro Numazu	(Japan) Yumeki Yokoyama	FC Imabari	
August	(North Korea) Kim Jong-song	FC Ryukyu	(Brazil) Marcus Índio	FC Imabari	(Japan) Daigo Furukawa	FC Osaka	(Japan) Yumeki Yokoyama	FC Imabari	
September	(Japan) Yuji Okuma	Tegevajaro Miyazaki	(Japan) Masato Kojima	Omiya Ardija	(Japan) Makoto Fukoin	Gainare Tottori	(Japan) Mahiro Ano	Tegevajaro Miyazaki	
October	(Japan) Kentaro Hayashi	Gainare Tottori	(Japan) Kosuke Fujioka	FC Gifu	(Japan) Takafumi Yamada	FC Imabari	(Japan) Ryo Nishitani	FC Gifu	
November/December	(Japan) Masahiro Shimoda	Matsumoto Yamaga	(Brazil) Marcus Índio	FC Imabari	(Japan) Reo Yasunaga	Matsumoto Yamaga	(Japan) Rei Umeki	FC Imabari	

== See also ==
- 2024 Japanese Super Cup
- 2024 Emperor's Cup
- 2024 J1 League
- 2024 J2 League
- 2024 J.League Cup
- 2024 Japan Football League
