= J.League Player of the Year =

Football award

The J.League Player of the Year (formerly known as the "J.League Most Valuable Player Award" from 1993 to 2020) is awarded by the J.League to the most valuable player of the season.

== J1 League winners ==
Award recipients
Year	Footballer	Club	Nationality	Ref.
1993	Kazuyoshi Miura	Verdy Kawasaki	Japan	
1994	Pereira	Verdy Kawasaki	Brazil	
1995	Dragan Stojković	Nagoya Grampus Eight	FR Yugoslavia	
1996	Jorginho	Kashima Antlers	Brazil	
1997	Dunga	Júbilo Iwata	Brazil	
1998	Masashi Nakayama	Júbilo Iwata	Japan	
1999	Alex	Shimizu S-Pulse	Brazil	
2000	Shunsuke Nakamura	Yokohama F. Marinos	Japan	
2001	Toshiya Fujita	Júbilo Iwata	Japan	
2002	Naohiro Takahara	Júbilo Iwata	Japan	
2003	Emerson	Urawa Red Diamonds	Brazil	
2004	Yuji Nakazawa	Yokohama F. Marinos	Japan	
2005	Araújo	Gamba Osaka	Brazil	
2006	Marcus Tulio Tanaka	Urawa Red Diamonds	Japan	
2007	Robson Ponte	Urawa Red Diamonds	Brazil	
2008	Marquinhos	Kashima Antlers	Brazil	
2009	Mitsuo Ogasawara	Kashima Antlers	Japan	
2010	Seigo Narazaki	Nagoya Grampus	Japan	
2011	Leandro Domingues	Kashiwa Reysol	Brazil	
2012	Hisato Satō	Sanfrecce Hiroshima	Japan	
2013	Shunsuke Nakamura	Yokohama F. Marinos	Japan	
2014	Yasuhito Endō	Gamba Osaka	Japan	
2015	Toshihiro Aoyama	Sanfrecce Hiroshima	Japan	
2016	Kengo Nakamura	Kawasaki Frontale	Japan	
2017	Yū Kobayashi	Kawasaki Frontale	Japan	
2018	Akihiro Ienaga	Kawasaki Frontale	Japan	
2019	Teruhito Nakagawa	Yokohama F. Marinos	Japan	
2020	Michael Olunga	Kashiwa Reysol	Kenya	
2021	Leandro Damião	Kawasaki Frontale	Brazil	
2022	Tomoki Iwata	Yokohama F. Marinos	Japan	
2023	Yuya Osako	Vissel Kobe	Japan	
2024	Yoshinori Muto	Vissel Kobe	Japan	
2025	Tomoki Hayakawa	Kashima Antlers	Japan	

=== Wins by club ===
#	Club	Winners
1	Yokohama F. Marinos	5
2	Júbilo Iwata	4
2	Kawasaki Frontale	4
2	Kashima Antlers	4
5	Urawa Red Diamonds	3
6	Tokyo Verdy	2
6	Nagoya Grampus	2
6	Gamba Osaka	2
6	Sanfrecce Hiroshima	2
6	Kashiwa Reysol	2
6	Vissel Kobe	2
12	Shimizu S-Pulse	1

== J2 League winners ==
The MVP award winner is given a trophy and a prize of ¥500,000 (US$4,555.81).

Award recipients
Year	Footballer	Club	Nationality	Ref.
2022	Koki Ogawa	Yokohama FC	Japan	
2023	Erik	FC Machida Zelvia	Brazil	
2024	Hiiro Komori	JEF United Chiba	Japan	
2025	Matheus Jesus	V-Varen Nagasaki	Brazil	

== J3 League winners ==
The MVP award winner is given a trophy and a prize of ¥200,000 (US$1,822.32).

Award recipients
Year	Footballer	Club	Nationality	Ref.
2022	Ryo Arita	Iwaki FC	Japan	
2023	Riki Matsuda	Ehime FC	Japan	
2024	Marcus Índio	FC Imabari	Brazil	
2025	Keigo Hashimoto	Tegevajaro Miyazaki	Japan	

== See also ==
- J.League awards
