= J.League Monthly MVP =

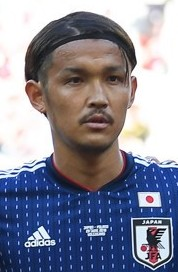
- Takashi Usami has won the award a record seven times.
- Awarded for: The best player each month of the season in the J1 League, J2 League and J3 League
- Sponsored by: KONAMI
- Country: Japan
- Presented by: J.League
- First award: 2013

Highlights
- Most awards: Takashi Usami (7)
- Most consecutive wins: 2 (Akihiro Ienaga, Jong Tae-se, Leonardo, Léo Ceará)
- Most awards in a single season: 3 (Jong Tae-se: 2016; Koki Ogawa: 2022; Yuya Osako: 2023)

The Meiji Yasuda J.League KONAMI Monthly MVP is an association football award that recognises the best player each month of the season in the J1 League, J2 League, and J3 League.

The first awards were given in the 2013 season to J1 League and J2 League players. The J3 League was created in 2014, but they weren't included in the awards until the 2019 season.

The winners are chosen by a selection committee currently made up of a mix of J.League officials, commentators and some members of the media. A selection committee meeting is held each month where the members cast their votes for the winners of the MVP award. The winners receive prize money (J1: 300,000 yen, J2: 200,000 yen, J3: 100,000 yen) and their award is presented on the player's first home game following the announcement.

It has been previously known as the Coca-Cola J.League Monthly MVP (2013-2014), Meiji Yasuda J.League Coca-Cola Monthly MVP (2015), Meiji Yasuda J.League Monthly MVP (2016), Meiji Yasuda J.League Mastercard priceless japan Monthly MVP (2017–2018); since the 2019 season, it has been known as the Meiji Yasuda J.League KONAMI Monthly MVP.

Takashi Usami has been named Monthly MVP the most, winning seven awards across both the J1 and J2 League. Léo Ceará is the only player to have won consecutive J1 League awards, albeit across two different seasons. Three players have won consecutive J2 League awards: Akihiro Ienaga, Jong Tae-se and Leonardo. Yuya Osako is the only player to have won three J1 MVP awards in a single season, achieved in 2023. Jong Tae-se won three J2 MVP awards in the 2016 season and Koki Ogawa achieved the same in the 2022 season.

== J1 League ==
=== List of winners ===
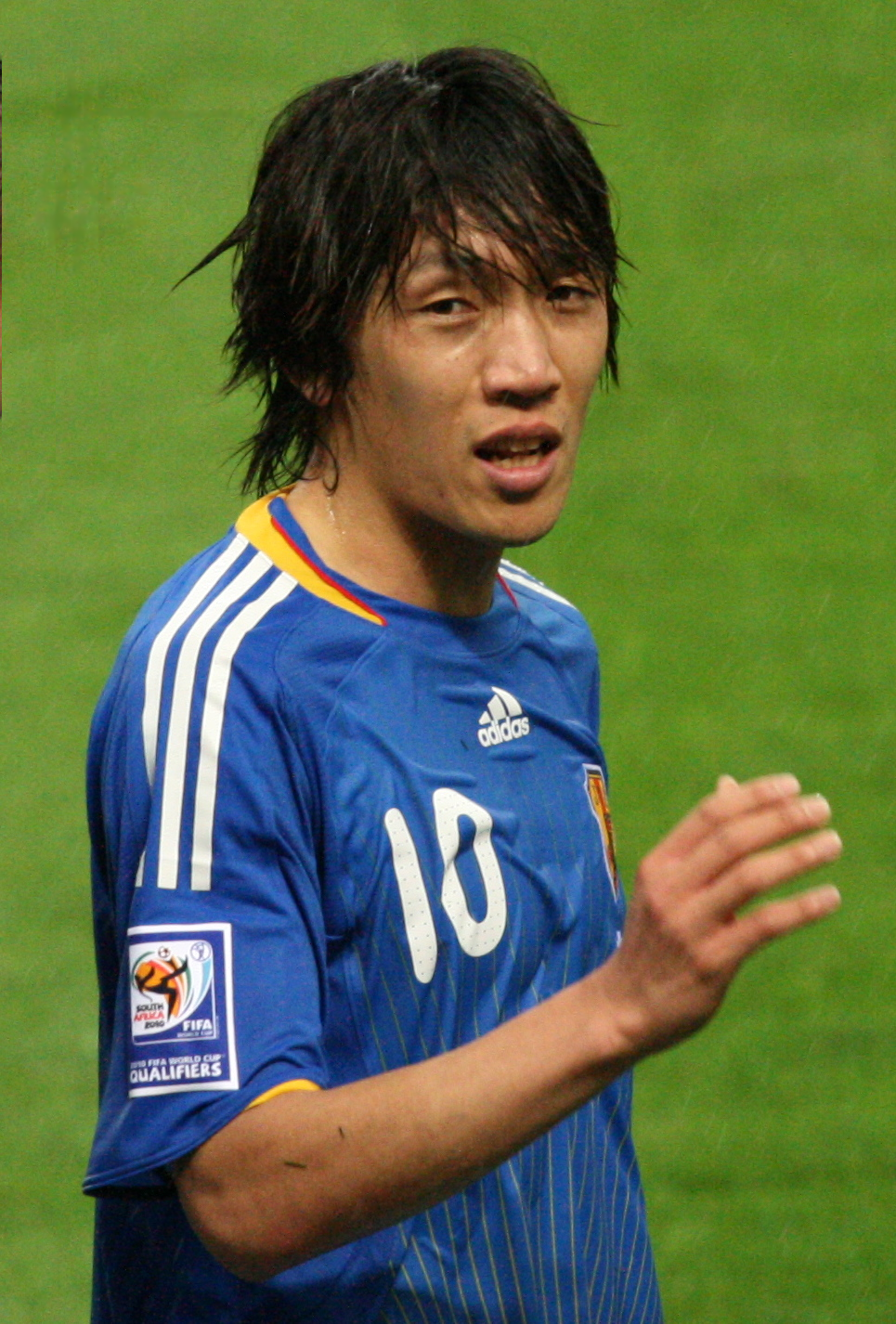
Shunsuke Nakamura won the first J1 Monthly MVP award in March 2013.

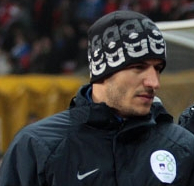
Zlatan Ljubijankić was the first European player to win the J1 award.

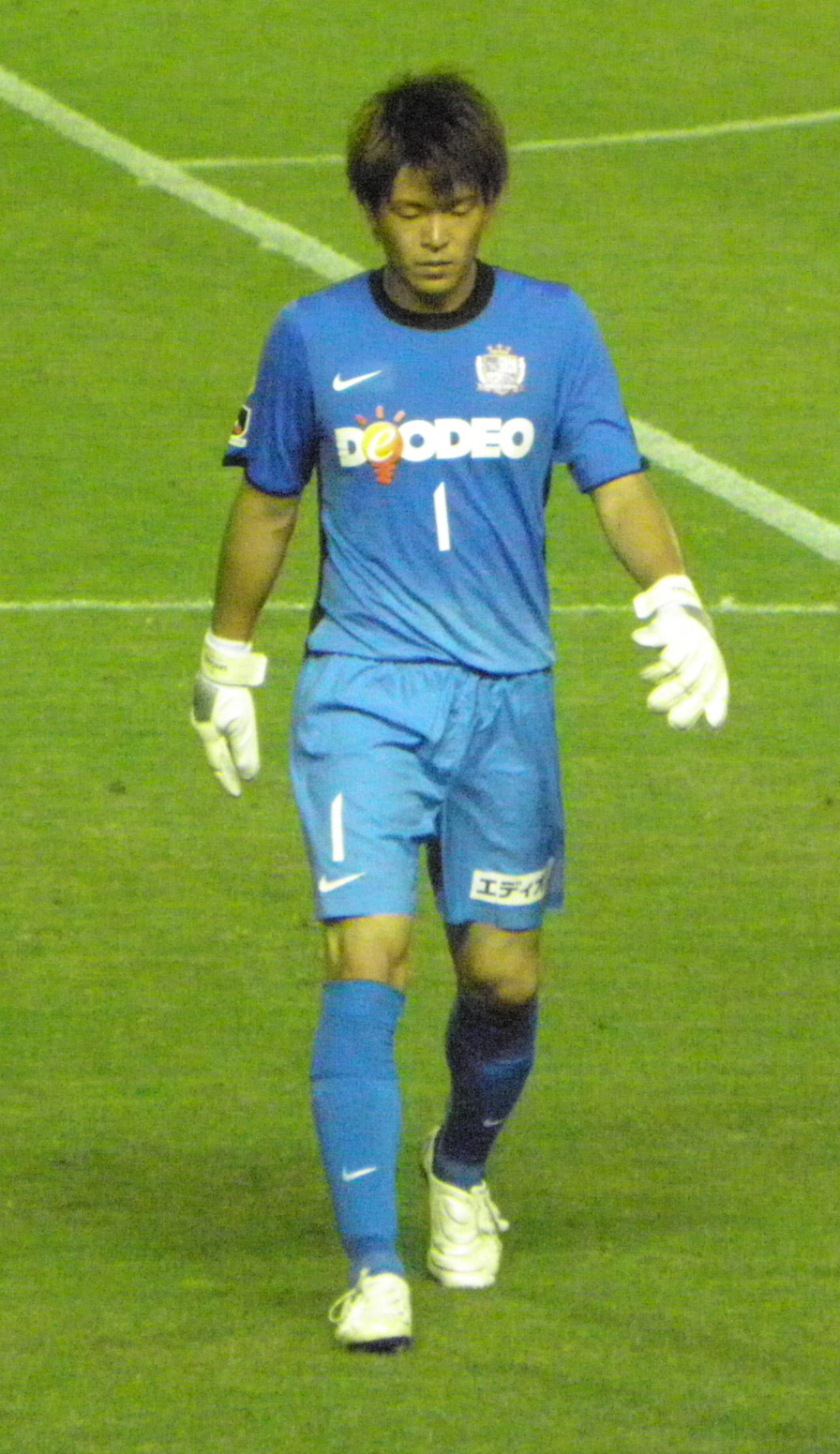
Shusaku Nishikawa was the first player to win the J1 award two and three times, and also the first to win it with different clubs.

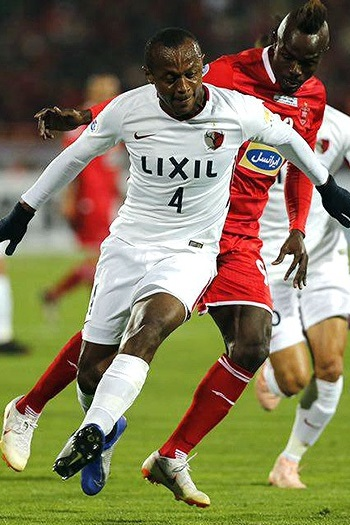
Léo Silva was the first South American player to win the J1 award.

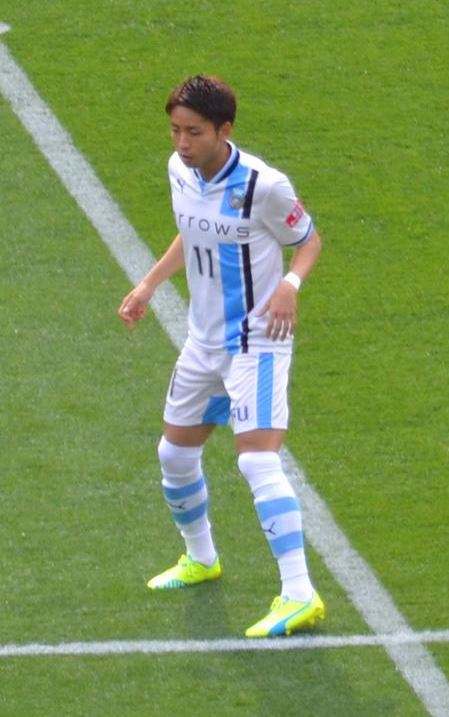
Yu Kobayashi won the J1 award three times.

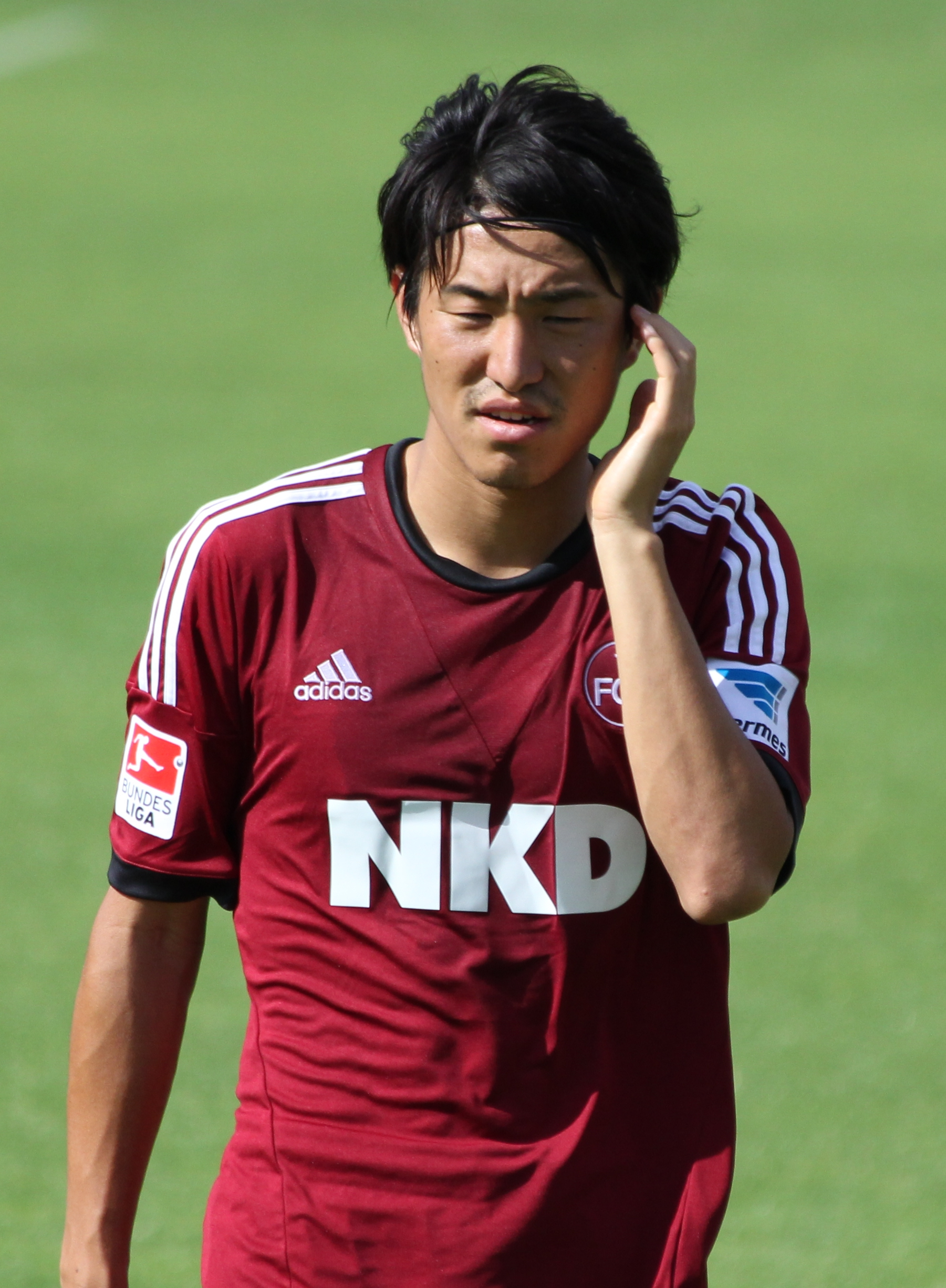
Mu Kanazaki won the J1 award twice.

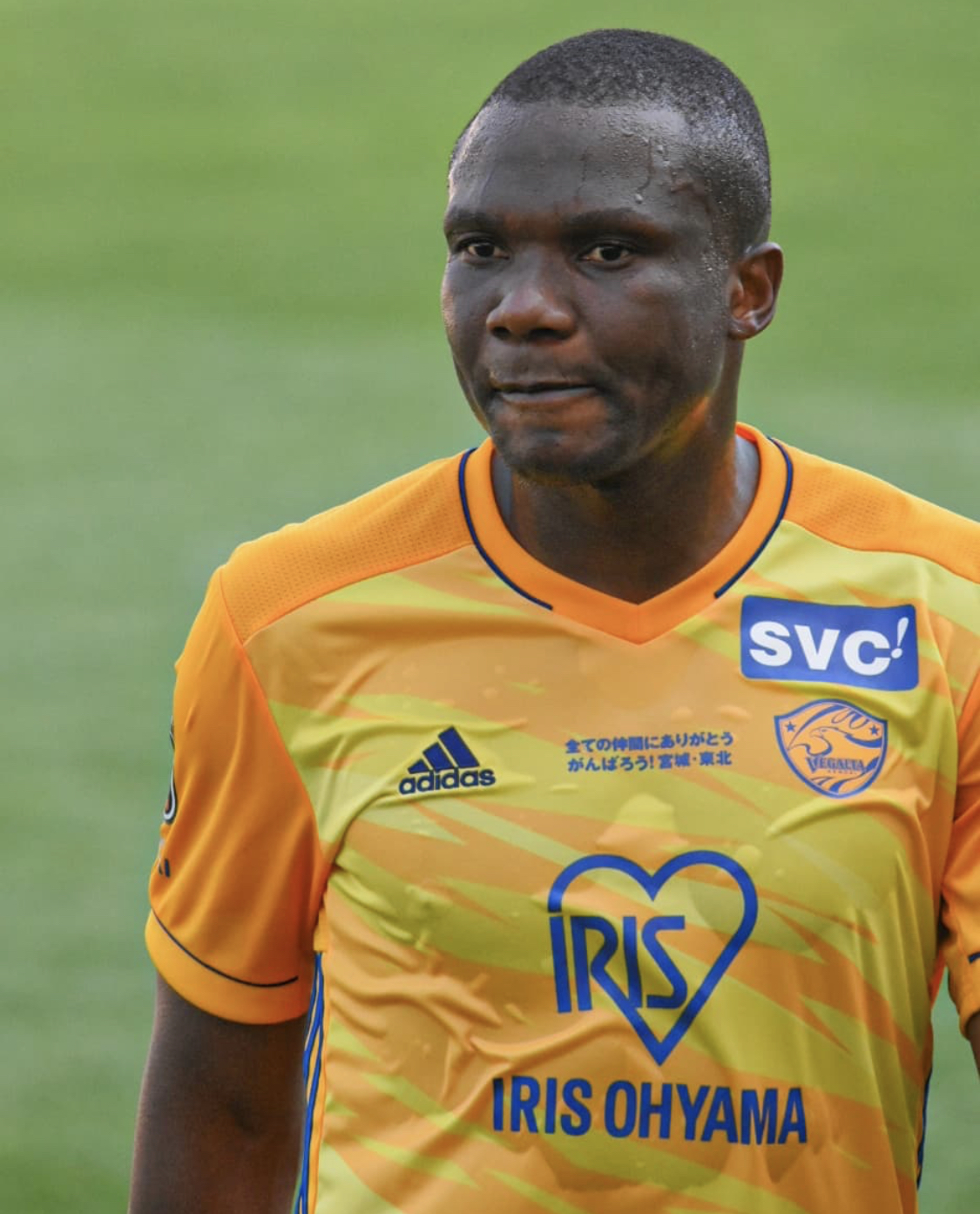
Simão Mate was the first African player to win the J1 award.

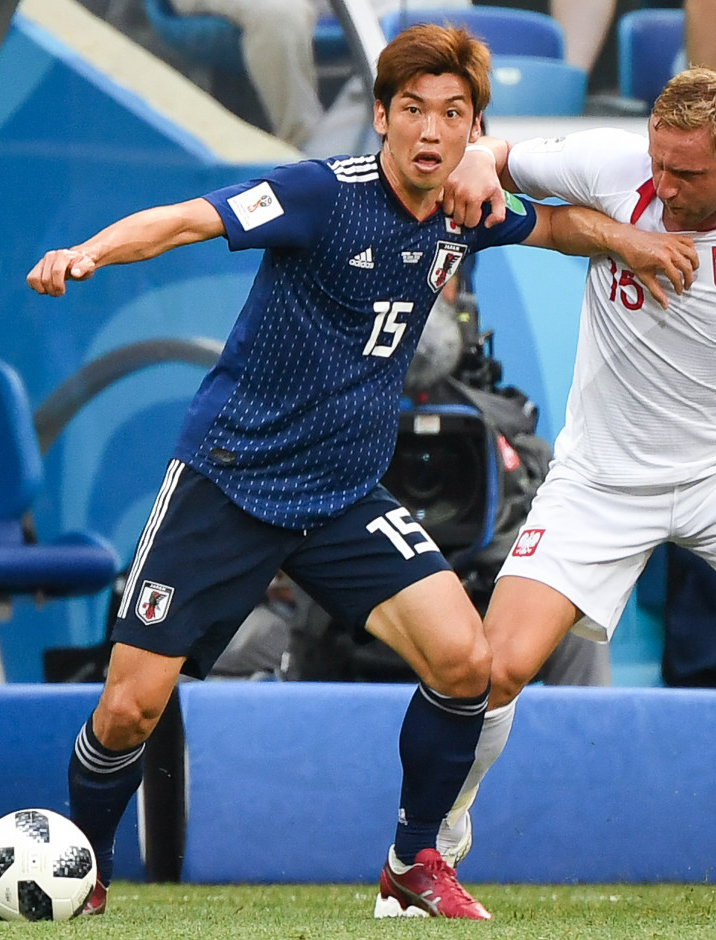
Yuya Osako had a ten year gap between his first and second award (August 2013 and May 2023)

Winners
Month	Year	Player	Nationality	Pos.	Club	Ref.
March	2013	Shunsuke Nakamura	Japan	MF	Yokohama F. Marinos	
April	2013	Zlatan Ljubijankić	Slovenia	FW	Omiya Ardija	
May	2013	Yoichiro Kakitani	Japan	MF	Cerezo Osaka	
July	2013	Shusaku Nishikawa	Japan	GK	Sanfrecce Hiroshima	
August	2013	Yuya Osako	Japan	FW	Kashima Antlers	
September	2013	Ariajasuru Hasegawa	Japan	MF	FC Tokyo	
October	2013	Tetsuya Enomoto	Japan	GK	Yokohama F. Marinos	
November/December	2013	Yoshito Okubo	Japan	FW	Kawasaki Frontale	
March	2014	Tsukasa Shiotani	Japan	DF	Sanfrecce Hiroshima	
April	2014	Léo Silva	Brazil	MF	Albirex Niigata	
May	2014	Shingo Akamine	Japan	FW	Vegalta Sendai	
July	2014	Shusaku Nishikawa	Japan	GK	Urawa Reds	
August	2014	Gaku Shibasaki	Japan	MF	Kashima Antlers	
September	2014	Takashi Usami	Japan	FW	Gamba Osaka	
October	2014	Naoki Ishihara	Japan	FW	Sanfrecce Hiroshima	
November/December	2014	Masaaki Higashiguchi	Japan	GK	Gamba Osaka	
March	2015	Yoshinori Muto	Japan	FW	FC Tokyo	
April	2015	Takashi Usami	Japan	FW	Gamba Osaka	
May	2015	Takahiro Sekine	Japan	MF	Urawa Reds	
June	2015	Yuki Muto	Japan	FW	Urawa Reds	
July	2015	Hisato Satō	Japan	FW	Sanfrecce Hiroshima	
August	2015	Manabu Saitō	Japan	FW	Yokohama F. Marinos	
September	2015	Shusaku Nishikawa	Japan	GK	Urawa Reds	
October	2015	Shunsuke Nakamura	Japan	MF	Yokohama F. Marinos	
November	2015	Douglas	Brazil	FW	Sanfrecce Hiroshima	
February/March	2016	Kengo Nakamura	Japan	MF	Kawasaki Frontale	
April	2016	Tadanari Lee	Japan	FW	Urawa Red Diamonds	
May	2016	Mu Kanazaki	Japan	FW	Kashima Antlers	
June	2016	Mitsuo Ogasawara	Japan	MF	Kashima Antlers	
July	2016	Yu Kobayashi	Japan	FW	Kawasaki Frontale	
August	2016	Shun Nagasawa	Japan	FW	Gamba Osaka	
September	2016	Leandro	Brazil	FW	Vissel Kobe	
October/November	2016	Manabu Saitō	Japan	FW	Yokohama F. Marinos	
February/March	2017	Rafael Silva	Brazil	FW	Urawa Red Diamonds	
April	2017	Shinzo Koroki	Japan	FW	Urawa Red Diamonds	
May	2017	Kosuke Nakamura	Japan	GK	Kashiwa Reysol	
June	2017	Yuji Nakazawa	Japan	DF	Yokohama F. Marinos	
July	2017	Kenyu Sugimoto	Japan	FW	Cerezo Osaka	
August	2017	Mu Kanazaki	Japan	FW	Kashima Antlers	
September	2017	Yu Kobayashi	Japan	FW	Kawasaki Frontale	
October	2017	Jay Bothroyd	England	FW	Consadole Sapporo	
November	2017	Yu Kobayashi	Japan	FW	Kawasaki Frontale	
February/March	2018	Takuto Hayashi	Japan	GK	Sanfrecce Hiroshima	
April	2018	Diego Oliveira	Brazil	FW	FC Tokyo	
May	2018	Patric	Brazil	FW	Sanfrecce Hiroshima	
July	2018	Yuma Suzuki	Japan	FW	Kashima Antlers	
August	2018	Jô	Brazil	FW	Nagoya Grampus	
September	2018	Yasuyuki Konno	Japan	MF	Gamba Osaka	
October	2018	Koya Kitagawa	Japan	FW	Shimizu S-Pulse	
November/December	2018	Hwang Ui-jo	South Korea	FW	Gamba Osaka	
February/March	2019	Noriaki Fujimoto	Japan	FW	Oita Trinita	
April	2019	Diego Oliveira	Brazil	FW	FC Tokyo	
May	2019	Takuya Kida	Japan	MF	Yokohama F. Marinos	
June	2019	Simão Mate	Mozambique	DF	Vegalta Sendai	
July	2019	Serginho	Brazil	MF	Kashima Antlers	
August	2019	Yoshifumi Kashiwa	Japan	MF	Sanfrecce Hiroshima	
September	2019	Kenta Nishizawa	Japan	MF	Shimizu S-Pulse	
October	2019	Teruhito Nakagawa	Japan	FW	Yokohama F. Marinos	
November/December	2019	Takashi Usami	Japan	FW	Gamba Osaka	
February/June/July	2020	Akihiro Ienaga	Japan	MF	Kawasaki Frontale	
August	2020	Michael Olunga	Kenya	FW	Kashiwa Reysol	
September	2020	Erik	Brazil	FW	Yokohama F. Marinos	
October	2020	Yosuke Ideguchi	Japan	MF	Gamba Osaka	
November	2020	Everaldo	Brazil	FW	Kashima Antlers	
December	2020	Mitchell Langerak	Australia	GK	Nagoya Grampus	
February/March	2021	Sho Inagaki	Japan	MF	Nagoya Grampus	
April	2021	Leandro Damião	Brazil	FW	Kawasaki Frontale	
May	2021	Kasper Junker	Denmark	FW	Urawa Red Diamonds	
June	2021	Kyogo Furuhashi	Japan	FW	Vissel Kobe	
July	2021	Noriyoshi Sakai	Japan	MF	Sagan Tosu	
August	2021	Léo Ceará	Brazil	FW	Yokohama F. Marinos	
September	2021	Mitchell Langerak	Australia	GK	Nagoya Grampus	
October	2021	Andrés Iniesta	Spain	MF	Vissel Kobe	
November/December	2021	Leandro Damião	Brazil	FW	Kawasaki Frontale	
February/March	2022	Ayase Ueda	Japan	FW	Kashima Antlers	
April	2022	Peter Utaka	Nigeria	FW	Kyoto Sanga	
May	2022	Seiya Maikuma	Japan	DF	Cerezo Osaka	
June	2022	Kota Mizunuma	Japan	MF	Yokohama F. Marinos	
July	2022	Léo Ceará	Brazil	FW	Yokohama F. Marinos	
August	2022	Akihiro Ienaga	Japan	MF	Kawasaki Frontale	
September	2022	Tomoki Iwata	Japan	DF	Yokohama F. Marinos	
October/November	2022	Marcinho	Brazil	MF	Kawasaki Frontale	
February/March	2023	Ryotaro Ito	Japan	MF	Albirex Niigata	
April	2023	Douglas Vieira	Brazil	FW	Sanfrecce Hiroshima	
May	2023	Yuya Osako	Japan	FW	Vissel Kobe	
June	2023	Yoshinori Muto	Japan	FW	Vissel Kobe	
July	2023	Yuya Osako	Japan	FW	Vissel Kobe	
August	2023	Yuta Higuchi	Japan	MF	Kashima Antlers	
September	2023	Kazuya Konno	Japan	MF	Avispa Fukuoka	
October	2023	Daiki Tomii	Japan	GK	Shonan Bellmare	
November/December	2023	Yuya Osako	Japan	FW	Vissel Kobe	
February/March	2024	Yu Hirakawa	Japan	FW	Machida Zelvia	
April	2024	Ryo Germain	Japan	FW	Júbilo Iwata	
May	2024	Yuma Suzuki	Japan	FW	Kashima Antlers	
June	2024	Takashi Usami	Japan	FW	Gamba Osaka	
July	2024	Lukian	Brazil	FW	Shonan Bellmare	
August	2024	Rafael Elias	Brazil	FW	Kyoto Sanga	
September	2024	Kensuke Nagai	Japan	FW	Nagoya Grampus	
October	2024	Takashi Usami	Japan	FW	Gamba Osaka	
November/December	2024	Yoshinori Muto	Japan	FW	Vissel Kobe	
February/March	2025	Léo Ceará	Brazil	FW	Kashima Antlers	
April	2025	Rafael Elias	Brazil	FW	Kyoto Sanga	
May	2025	Lucas Fernandes	Brazil	MF	Cerezo Osaka	
June	2025	Tojiro Kubo	Japan	MF	Kashiwa Reysol	
July	2025	Taisei Miyashiro	Japan	FW	Vissel Kobe	
August	2025	Rafael Elias	Brazil	FW	Kyoto Sanga	
September	2025	Tatsuya Itō	Japan	FW	Kawasaki Frontale	
October	2025	Tomoki Hayakawa	Japan	GK	Kashima Antlers	
November/December	2025	Léo Ceará	Brazil	FW	Kashima Antlers	
August	2026–27	Léo Ceará	Brazil	FW	Kashima Antlers	
September	2026–27	Yusuke Segawa	Japan	MF	Kashiwa Reysol	
October	2026–27	Motoki Nagakura	Japan	FW	FC Tokyo	

=== Multiple winners ===
As of October 2026 award

Players	Wins
Takashi Usami	5
Léo Ceará	5
Yuya Osako	4
Shusaku Nishikawa	3
Yu Kobayashi	3
Shunsuke Nakamura	3
Yoshinori Muto	3
Manabu Saitō	3
Rafael Elias	3
Mu Kanazaki	2
Diego Oliveira	2
Mitchell Langerak	2
Leandro Damião	2
Akihiro Ienaga	2
Yuma Suzuki	2

=== Awards won by nationality ===
As of October 2026 award

Nationality	Players	Wins
Japan	60	77
Brazil	17	25
Australia	1	2
Slovenia	1	1
England	1	1
South Korea	1	1
Mozambique	1	1
Kenya	1	1
Denmark	1	1
Spain	1	1
Nigeria	1	1

=== Awards won by club ===
As of October 2026 award

Club	Players	Wins
Kashima Antlers	11	15
Yokohama F. Marinos	10	13
Kawasaki Frontale	7	11
Gamba Osaka	6	10
Vissel Kobe	6	9
Sanfrecce Hiroshima	9	9
Urawa Red Diamonds	7	8
Nagoya Grampus	4	5
FC Tokyo	4	5
Kyoto Sanga	2	4
Cerezo Osaka	4	4
Kashiwa Reysol	4	4
Vegalta Sendai	2	2
Shimizu S-Pulse	2	2
Albirex Niigata	2	2
Shonan Bellmare	2	2
Omiya Ardija	1	1
Consadole Sapporo	1	1
Oita Trinita	1	1
Sagan Tosu	1	1
Avispa Fukuoka	1	1
Machida Zelvia	1	1
Júbilo Iwata	1	1

== J2 League ==
=== List of winners ===
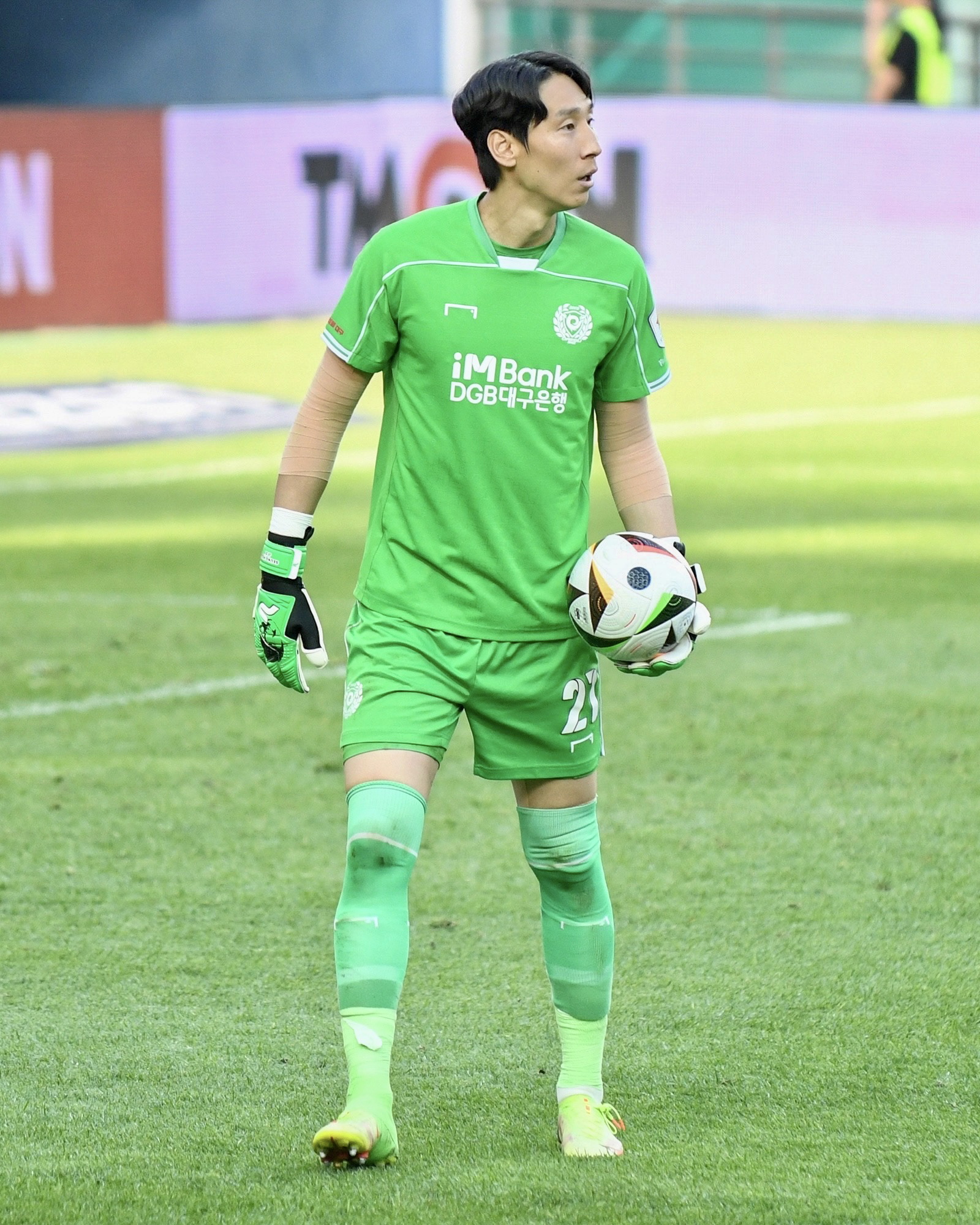
Oh Seung-hoon was the first goalkeeper to win the J2 award.

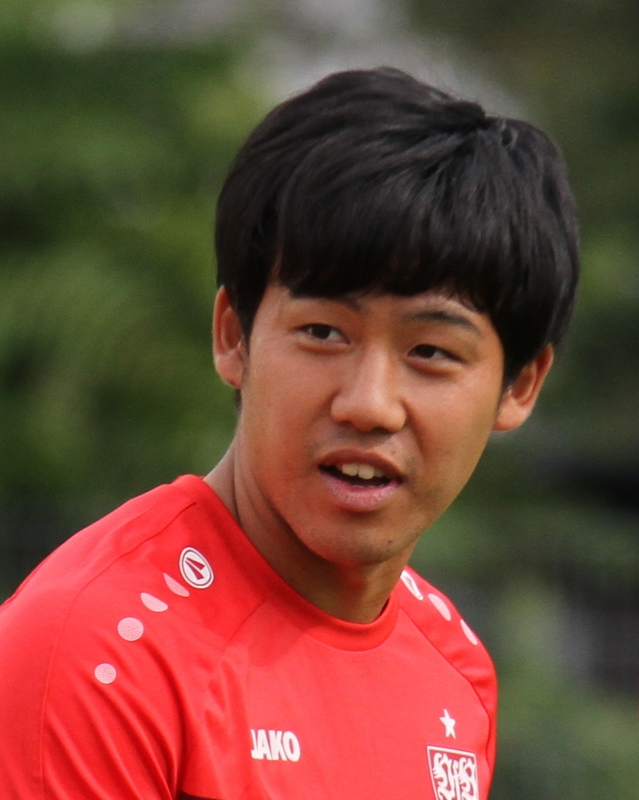
Wataru Endo was the first defender to win the J2 award.

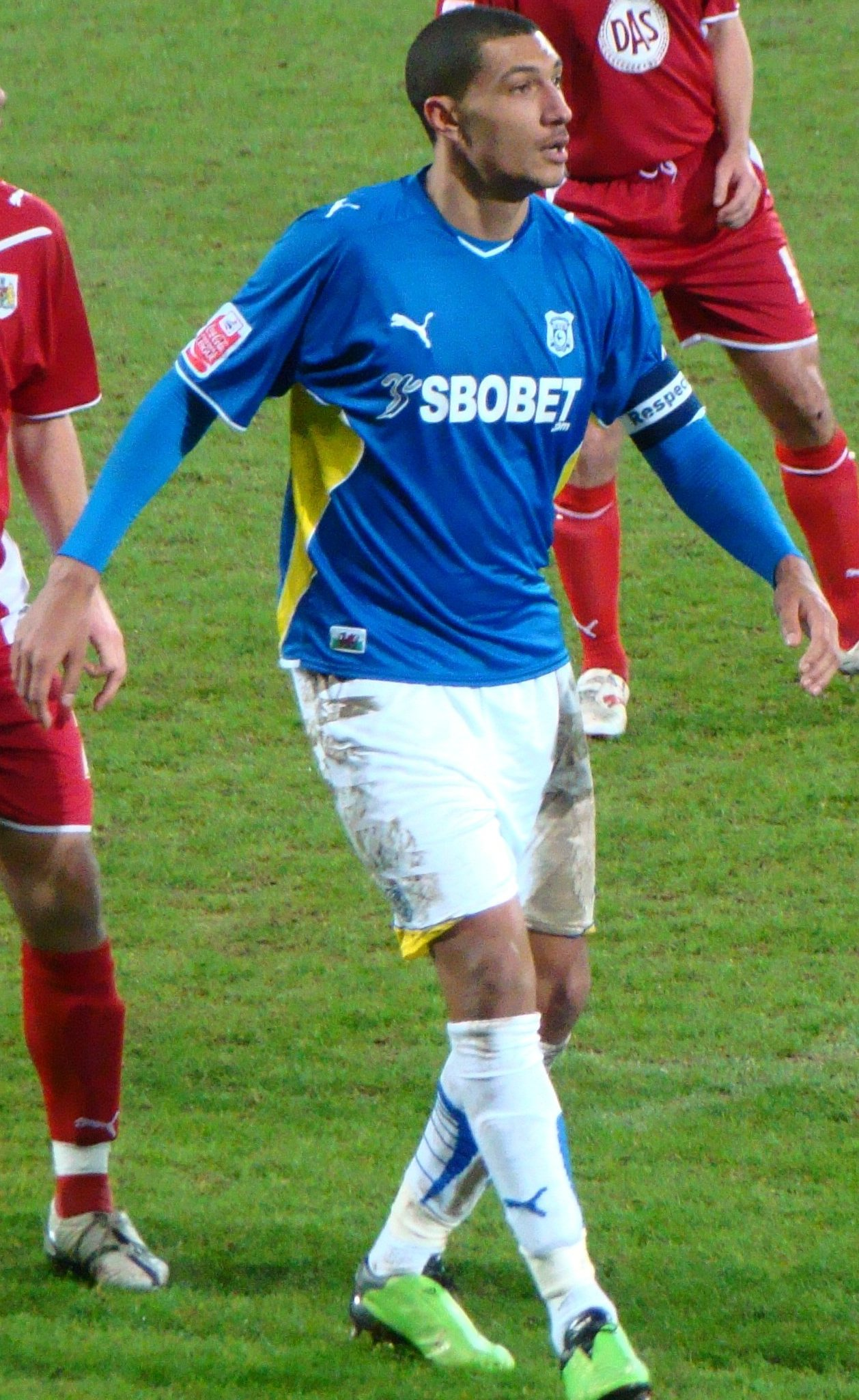
Jay Bothroyd was the first European player to win the J2 award.

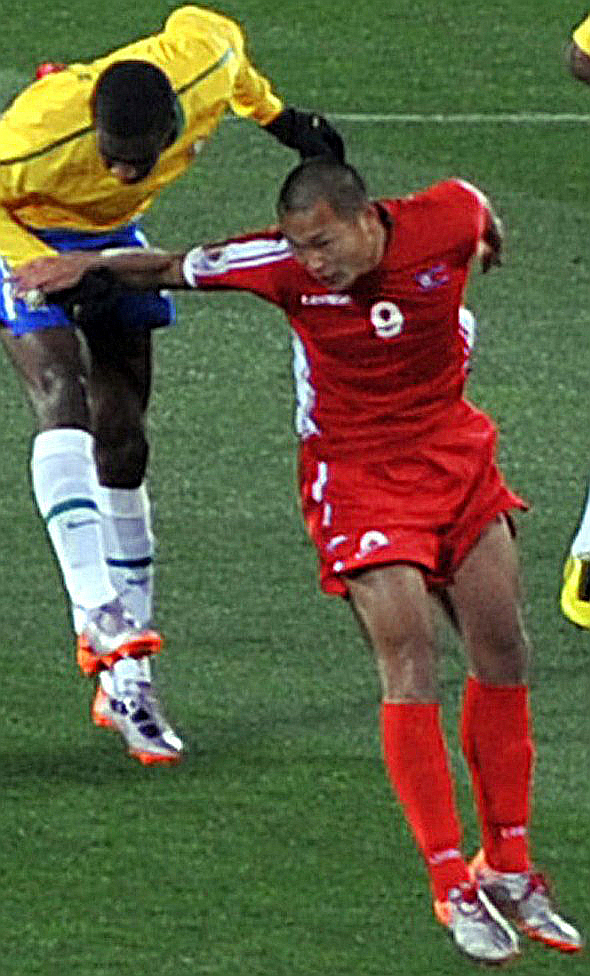
Jong Tae-se was the first player to have won three J2 awards and the first player across all divisions to win three awards in one season.

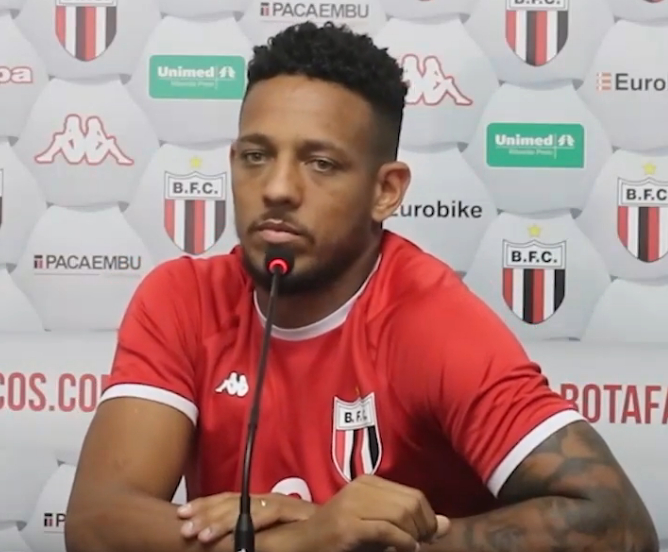
Wellington won the J2 award twice.

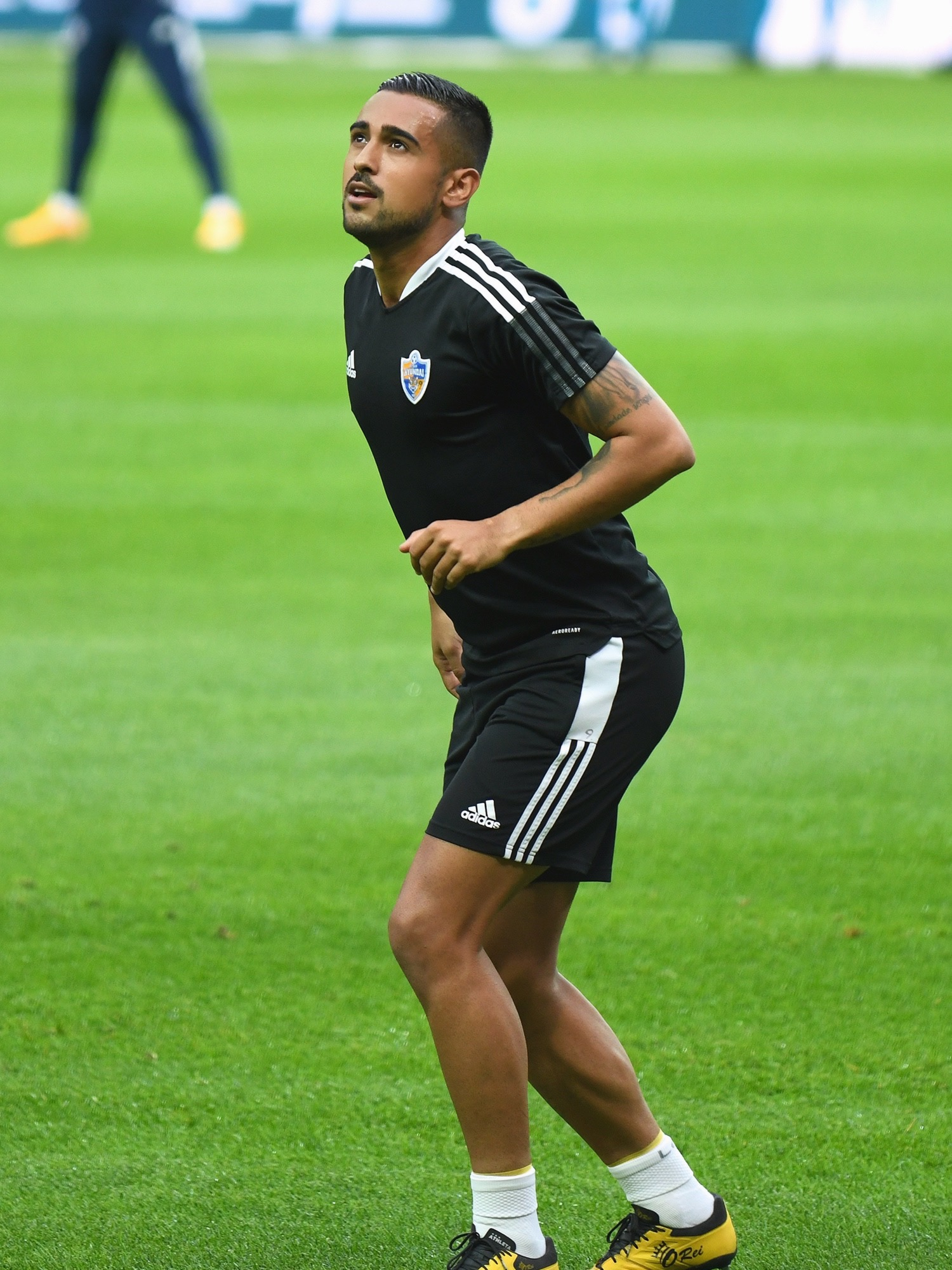
Leonardo won the J2 award twice.

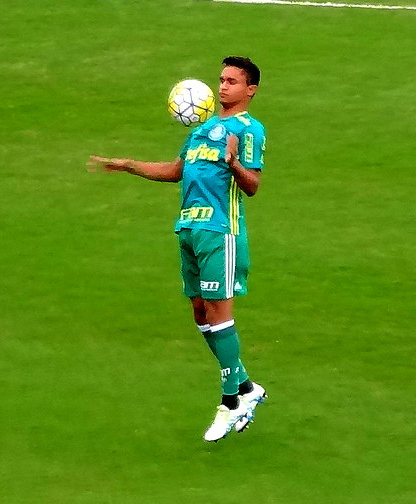
Erik won the J2 award twice in the 2023 season.

Winners
Month	Year	Player	Nationality	Pos.	Club	Ref.
March	2013	Popó	Brazil	FW	Vissel Kobe	
April	2013	Leandro	Brazil	FW	Gamba Osaka	
May	2013	Oh Seung-hoon	South Korea	GK	Kyoto Sanga	
June	2013	Ryohei Hayashi	Japan	FW	Montedio Yamagata	
July	2013	Koji Yamase	Japan	MF	Kyoto Sanga	
August	2013	Takashi Usami	Japan	MF	Gamba Osaka	
September	2013	Keijiro Ogawa	Japan	FW	Vissel Kobe	
October	2013	Kempes	Brazil	FW	JEF United Chiba	
November/December	2013	Takashi Usami	Japan	MF	Gamba Osaka	
March	2014	Ryota Nagaki	Japan	MF	Shonan Bellmare	
April	2014	Wataru Endo	Japan	DF	Shonan Bellmare	
May	2014	Takayuki Funayama	Japan	FW	Matsumoto Yamaga	
June	2014	Takeshi Kanamori	Japan	FW	Avispa Fukuoka	
July	2014	Kota Ueda	Japan	MF	Fagiano Okayama	
August	2014	Toshihiro Matsushita	Japan	MF	Yokohama FC	
September	2014	Masashi Oguro	Japan	FW	Kyoto Sanga	
October	2014	Takayuki Morimoto	Japan	FW	JEF United Chiba	
November/December	2014	Norihiro Yamagishi	Japan	GK	Montedio Yamagata	
March	2015	Paulinho	Brazil	MF	JEF United Chiba	
April	2015	Shohei Kiyohara	Japan	MF	Zweigen Kanazawa	
May	2015	Ken Tokura	Japan	FW	Consadole Sapporo	
June	2015	Akihiro Ienaga	Japan	MF	Omiya Ardija	
July	2015	Akihiro Ienaga	Japan	MF	Omiya Ardija	
August	2015	Jay Bothroyd	England	FW	Júbilo Iwata	
September	2015	Kosuke Nakamura	Japan	GK	Avispa Fukuoka	
October	2015	Jay Bothroyd	England	FW	Júbilo Iwata	
November	2015	Wellington	Brazil	FW	Avispa Fukuoka	
February/March	2016	Koki Kiyotake	Japan	MF	Roasso Kumamoto	
April	2016	Yoshihiro Shoji	Japan	MF	Renofa Yamaguchi	
May	2016	Yoshihiro Uchimura	Japan	FW	Consadole Sapporo	
June	2016	Shinya Yajima	Japan	MF	Fagiano Okayama	
July	2016	Jong Tae-se	North Korea	FW	Shimizu S-Pulse	
August	2016	Yuki Matsushita	Japan	MF	Thespakusatsu Gunma	
September	2016	Hotaru Yamaguchi	Japan	MF	Cerezo Osaka	
October	2016	Jong Tae-se	North Korea	FW	Shimizu S-Pulse	
November	2016	Jong Tae-se	North Korea	FW	Shimizu S-Pulse	
February/March	2017	Daiki Watari	Japan	FW	Tokushima Vortis	
April	2017	Ibba Laajab	Denmark	FW	Yokohama FC	
May	2017	Wellington	Brazil	FW	Avispa Fukuoka	
June	2017	Yota Akimoto	Japan	GK	Shonan Bellmare	
July	2017	Shingo Akamine	Japan	FW	Fagiano Okayama	
August	2017	Gabriel Xavier	Brazil	MF	Nagoya Grampus	
September	2017	Kohei Kudo	Japan	MF	Matsumoto Yamaga	
October	2017	Douglas Vieira	Brazil	FW	Tokyo Verdy	
November	2017	Yusuke Maeda	Japan	MF	V-Varen Nagasaki	
February/March	2018	Ado Onaiwu	Japan	FW	Renofa Yamaguchi	
April	2018	Kosuke Onose	Japan	MF	Renofa Yamaguchi	
May	2018	Kyogo Furuhashi	Japan	FW	FC Gifu	
June	2018	Genki Omae	Japan	FW	Omiya Ardija	
July	2018	Tatsuya Morita	Japan	GK	Matsumoto Yamaga	
August	2018	Taiki Hirato	Japan	MF	Machida Zelvia	
September	2018	Masaki Iida	Japan	DF	Matsumoto Yamaga	
October	2018	Kazushi Mitsuhira	Japan	FW	Oita Trinita	
November/December	2018	Leandro Domingues	Brazil	MF	Yokohama FC	
February/March	2019	Koji Suzuki	Japan	FW	FC Ryukyu	
April	2019	Lee Yong-jae	South Korea	FW	Fagiano Okayama	
May	2019	Keiya Sento	Japan	MF	Kyoto Sanga	
June	2019	Ken Iwao	Japan	MF	Tokushima Vortis	
July	2019	Cristiano	Brazil	FW	Kashiwa Reysol	
August	2019	Michael Olunga	Kenya	FW	Kashiwa Reysol	
September	2019	Leonardo	Brazil	FW	Albirex Niigata	
October	2019	Leonardo	Brazil	FW	Albirex Niigata	
November/December	2019	Yutaka Soneda	Japan	MF	Ventforet Kofu	
February/June/July	2020	Hiroki Akino	Japan	MF	V-Varen Nagasaki	
August	2020	Akira Silvano Disaro	Japan	FW	Giravanz Kitakyushu	
September	2020	Takumi Kamijima	Japan	DF	Avispa Fukuoka	
October	2020	Vinícius Araújo	Brazil	FW	Montedio Yamagata	
November	2020	Yuki Kakita	Japan	FW	Tokushima Vortis	
December	2020	Daiya Tono	Japan	FW	Avispa Fukuoka	
February/March	2021	Yoshiaki Takagi	Japan	MF	Albirex Niigata	
April	2021	Peter Utaka	Nigeria	FW	Kyoto Sanga	
May	2021	Tomoya Miki	Japan	MF	JEF United Chiba	
June	2021	Jin Izumisawa	Japan	MF	Ventforet Kofu	
July	2021	Hikaru Nakahara	Japan	MF	Roasso Kumamoto	
August	2021	Jungo Fujimoto	Japan	MF	SC Sagamihara	
September	2021	Edigar Junio	Brazil	FW	V-Varen Nagasaki	
October	2021	Satoki Uejo	Japan	FW	Fagiano Okayama	
November/December	2021	Motoki Hasegawa	Japan	MF	Ventforet Kofu	
February/March	2022	Koki Ogawa	Japan	FW	Yokohama FC	
April	2022	Ryoma Kida	Japan	MF	Vegalta Sendai	
May	2022	Shunsuke Mito	Japan	MF	Albirex Niigata	
June	2022	Koki Ogawa	Japan	FW	Yokohama FC	
July	2022	Edigar Junio	Brazil	FW	V-Varen Nagasaki	
August	2022	Jordy Buijs	Netherlands	DF	Fagiano Okayama	
September	2022	Hiroya Matsumoto	Japan	MF	Zweigen Kanazawa	
October/November	2022	Koki Ogawa	Japan	FW	Yokohama FC	
February/March	2023	Erik	Brazil	MF	Machida Zelvia	
April	2023	Juanma	Spain	FW	V-Varen Nagasaki	
May	2023	Kaito Mori	Japan	FW	Tokushima Vortis	
June	2023	Erik	Brazil	MF	Machida Zelvia	
July	2023	Hiroto Iwabuchi	Japan	FW	Iwaki FC	
August	2023	Yoshinori Suzuki	Japan	DF	Shimizu S-Pulse	
September	2023	Taishi Taguchi	Japan	MF	JEF United Chiba	
October	2023	Zento Uno	Japan	MF	Machida Zelvia	
February/March	2024	Gleyson	Brazil	FW	Fagiano Okayama	
April	2024	Koya Kitagawa	Japan	FW	Shimizu S-Pulse	
May	2024	Motohiko Nakajima	Japan	FW	Vegalta Sendai	
June	2024	Akito Fukumori	Japan	DF	Yokohama FC	
July	2024	Ryota Nagaki	Japan	MF	Tokushima Vortis	
August	2024	Shoma Doi	Japan	MF	Montedio Yamagata	
September	2024	Hiiro Komori	Japan	FW	JEF United Chiba	
October	2024	Matheus Jesus	Brazil	MF	V-Varen Nagasaki	
November/December	2024	Leo Takae	Japan	MF	Montedio Yamagata	
February/March	2025	Ren Komatsu	Japan	FW	Blaublitz Akita	
April	2025	Arata Watanabe	Japan	FW	Mito HollyHock	
May	2025	Arata Watanabe	Japan	FW	Mito HollyHock	
June	2025	Tomoki Takamine	Japan	MF	Hokkaido Consadole Sapporo	
July	2025	Shunsuke Saito	Japan	MF	Mito HollyHock	
August	2025	Matheus Jesus	Brazil	MF	V-Varen Nagasaki	
September	2025	Jun Nishikawa	Japan	MF	Sagan Tosu	
October	2025	Lucas Barcellos	Brazil	FW	Tokushima Vortis	
November/December	2025	Shoma Doi	Japan	MF	Montedio Yamagata	
August	2026–27	Carlinhos Júnior	Brazil	FW	RB Omiya Ardija	
September	2026–27	Motohiko Nakajima	Japan	FW	Vegalta Sendai	
October	2026–27	Tomoki Tagawa	Japan	GK	Hokkaido Consadole Sapporo	

=== Multiple winners ===
As of October 2026 award

Players	Wins
Jong Tae-se	3
Koki Ogawa	3
Takashi Usami	2
Akihiro Ienaga	2
Jay Bothroyd	2
Wellington	2
Leonardo	2
Edigar Junio	2
Erik	2
Ryota Nagaki	2
Arata Watanabe	2
Matheus Jesus	2
Shoma Doi	2
Motohiko Nakajima	2

=== Awards won by nationality ===
As of October 2026 award

Nationality	Players	Wins
Japan	73	81
Brazil	17	22
North Korea	1	3
South Korea	2	2
England	1	2
Denmark	1	1
Kenya	1	1
Nigeria	1	1
Netherlands	1	1
Spain	1	1

=== Awards won by club ===
As of October 2026 award

Club	Players	Wins
Yokohama FC	5	7
V-Varen Nagasaki	5	7
Fagiano Okayama	7	7
Avispa Fukuoka	5	6
Montedio Yamagata	5	6
JEF United Chiba	6	6
Tokushima Vortis	6	6
Shimizu S-Pulse	3	5
Kyoto Sanga	5	5
Albirex Niigata	3	4
Machida Zelvia	3	4
Omiya Ardija	3	4
Matsumoto Yamaga	4	4
Consadole Sapporo	4	4
Gamba Osaka	2	3
Shonan Bellmare	3	3
Mito HollyHock	2	3
Renofa Yamaguchi	3	3
Ventforet Kofu	3	3
Vegalta Sendai	2	3
Vissel Kobe	2	2
Kashiwa Reysol	2	2
Júbilo Iwata	1	2
Roasso Kumamoto	2	2
Zweigen Kanazawa	2	2
Nagoya Grampus	1	1
Tokyo Verdy	1	1
Thespakusatsu Gunma	1	1
Cerezo Osaka	1	1
FC Gifu	1	1
Oita Trinita	1	1
FC Ryukyu	1	1
Giravanz Kitakyushu	1	1
SC Sagamihara	1	1
Iwaki FC	1	1
Blaublitz Akita	1	1
Sagan Tosu	1	1

== J3 League ==
=== List of winners ===
Winners
Month	Year	Player	Nationality	Pos.	Club	Ref.
February/March	2019	Hiroto Yamada	Japan	FW	Cerezo Osaka U-23	
April	2019	Yasuhito Morishima	Japan	FW	Fujieda MYFC	
May	2019	Akito Takagi	Japan	FW	Gamba Osaka U-23	
June	2019	Tomoya Kitamura	Japan	FW	Roasso Kumamoto	
July	2019	Fernandinho	Brazil	FW	Gainare Tottori	
August	2019	Yuya Takazawa	Japan	FW	Thespakusatsu Gunma	
September	2019	Ryota Nakamura	Japan	MF	Blaublitz Akita	
October	2019	Masamichi Hayashi	Japan	MF	Gainare Tottori	
November/December	2019	Koken Kato	Japan	MF	Giravanz Kitakyushu	
February/June/July	2020	Yudai Tanaka	Japan	GK	Blaublitz Akita	
August	2020	Shuhei Kawasaki	Japan	FW	Gamba Osaka U-23	
September	2020	Tsubasa Yoshihira	Japan	FW	Fujieda MYFC	
October	2020	Nao Eguchi	Japan	MF	Blaublitz Akita	
November	2020	Ryota Nakamura	Japan	MF	Blaublitz Akita	
December	2020	Takuma Sonoda	Japan	FW	Kagoshima United	
March	2021	Shota Kawanishi	Japan	FW	FC Gifu	
April	2021	Kaito Umeda	Japan	FW	Tegevajaro Miyazaki	
May	2021	Origbaajo Ismaila	Nigeria	FW	Fukushima United	
June	2021	Yuki Morikawa	Japan	MF	Kamatamare Sanuki	
July	2021	Origbaajo Ismaila	Nigeria	FW	Fukushima United	
August	2021	Kazuki Dohana	Japan	DF	Fukushima United	
September	2021	Kaito Umeda	Japan	FW	Tegevajaro Miyazaki	
October	2021	Ryota Iwabuchi	Japan	FW	Fujieda MYFC	
November/December	2021	Yuya Taguchi	Japan	FW	Gainare Tottori	
February/March	2022	Hiroki Higuchi	Japan	FW	Fukushima United	
April	2022	Ayumu Yokoyama	Japan	FW	Matsumoto Yamaga	
May	2022	Koki Arita	Japan	FW	Kagoshima United	
June	2022	Hiroto Iwabuchi	Japan	FW	Iwaki FC	
July	2022	Tojiro Kubo	Japan	MF	Fujieda MYFC	
August	2022	Ryo Arita	Japan	FW	Iwaki FC	
September	2022	Kei Uchiyama	Japan	GK	Fujieda MYFC	
October/November	2022	Ryo Arita	Japan	FW	Iwaki FC	
February/March	2023	Tsuyoshi Miyaichi	Japan	FW	Iwate Grulla Morioka	
April	2023	Hayato Asakawa	Japan	FW	Nara Club	
May	2023	Sho Fukuda	Japan	MF	YSCC Yokohama	
June	2023	Yoji Sasaki	Japan	MF	Kataller Toyama	
July	2023	Shumpei Fukahori	Japan	MF	Ehime FC	
August	2023	Charles Nduka	Japan	FW	FC Gifu	
September	2023	Takahiro Kitsui	Japan	MF	FC Osaka	
October	2023	Rei Yonezawa	Japan	FW	Kagoshima United	
November/December	2023	Matheus Leiria	Brazil	FW	Kataller Toyama	
February/March	2024	Kosuke Fujioka	Japan	FW	FC Gifu	
April	2024	Hagumi Wada	Japan	FW	Azul Claro Numazu	
May	2024	Yu Tomidokoro	Japan	MF	FC Ryukyu	
June	2024	Arthur Silva	Brazil	MF	Omiya Ardija	
July	2024	Ryo Nagai	Japan	FW	Giravanz Kitakyushu	
August	2024	Marcus Índio	Brazil	FW	FC Imabari	
September	2024	Masato Kojima	Japan	MF	Omiya Ardija	
October	2024	Kosuke Fujioka	Japan	FW	FC Gifu	
November/December	2024	Marcus Índio	Brazil	FW	FC Imabari	
February/March	2025	Paulo Junichi Tanaka	Japan	MF	Tochigi City FC	
April	2025	Kokoro Kobayashi	Japan	FW	Kochi United SC	
May	2025	Takumi Shimada	Japan	FW	FC Osaka	
June	2025	Genki Egawa	Japan	DF	Tegevajaro Miyazaki	
July	2025	Ryuji Sawakami	Japan	FW	Vanraure Hachinohe	
August	2025	Keito Kawamura	Japan	FW	Kagoshima United	
September	2025	Katsuya Nakano	Japan	MF	Tochigi SC	
October	2025	Keigo Hashimoto	Japan	FW	Tegevajaro Miyazaki	
November/December	2025	Yasufumi Nishimura	Japan	MF	Thespa Gunma	
August	2026–27	Shota Hino	Japan	FW	Ehime FC	
September	2026–27	Sho Sumida	Japan	MF	FC Osaka	
October	2026–27	Shota Hino	Japan	FW	Ehime FC	

=== Multiple winners ===
As of October 2026 award

Players	Wins
Ryota Nakamura	2
Kaito Umeda	2
Origbaajo Ismaila	2
Ryo Arita	2
Kosuke Fujioka	2
Marcus Índio	2
Shota Hino	2

=== Awards won by nationality ===
As of October 2026 award

Nationality	Players	Wins
Japan	50	55
Brazil	4	5
Nigeria	1	2

=== Awards won by club ===
As of October 2026 award

Club	Players	Wins
Fujieda MYFC	5	5
Blaublitz Akita	3	4
Fukushima United	3	4
FC Gifu	3	4
Tegevajaro Miyazaki	3	4
Kagoshima United	4	4
Iwaki FC	2	3
Ehime FC	2	3
Gainare Tottori	3	3
FC Osaka	3	3
FC Imabari	1	2
Gamba Osaka U-23	2	2
Kataller Toyama	2	2
Giravanz Kitakyushu	2	2
Omiya Ardija	2	2
Thespa Gunma	2	2
Cerezo Osaka U-23	1	1
Roasso Kumamoto	1	1
Kamatamare Sanuki	1	1
Matsumoto Yamaga	1	1
Iwate Grulla Morioka	1	1
Nara Club	1	1
YSCC Yokohama	1	1
Azul Claro Numazu	1	1
FC Ryukyu	1	1
Tochigi City FC	1	1
Kochi United SC	1	1
Vanraure Hachinohe	1	1
Tochigi SC	1	1

== 100 Year Vision League ==
As the Japan Professional Football League (J.League) transitioned to an "autumn-spring system" in 2026, the J.League 100 Year Vision League was a special tournament held during the transitional period. J1 League clubs competed in the J1 100 Year Vision League whilst J2 and J3 League clubs competed in the J2/J3 100 Year Vision League.

=== J1 List of winners ===
Winners
Month	Region	Player	Nationality	Pos.	Club	Ref.
February	East	Yuki Soma	Japan	FW	Machida Zelvia	
February	West	Marco Túlio	Brazil	FW	Kyoto Sanga	
March	East	Yuma Suzuki	Japan	FW	Kashima Antlers	
March	West	Oh Se-hun	South Korea	FW	Shimizu S-Pulse	
April	East	Kein Satō	Japan	FW	FC Tokyo	
April	West	Tomoya Miki	Japan	MF	Avispa Fukuoka	
May	East	Léo Ceará	Brazil	FW	Kashima Antlers	
May	West	Shunta Tanaka	Japan	MF	Cerezo Osaka	

=== J2/J3 List of winners ===
Winners
Month	Region	Player	Nationality	Pos.	Club	Ref.
February	East A	Ryoma Kida	Japan	MF	Montedio Yamagata	
February	East B	Riyo Kawamoto	Japan	FW	FC Gifu	
February	West A	Lucas Barcellos	Brazil	FW	Tokushima Vortis	
February	West B	Eisuke Watanabe	Japan	MF	Tegevajaro Miyazaki	
March	East A	Arthur Silva	Brazil	MF	Shonan Bellmare	
March	East B	Itsuki Oda	Japan	DF	Matsumoto Yamaga	
March	West A	Lucas Barcellos (2)	Brazil	FW	Tokushima Vortis	
March	West B	Yuto Yamada	Japan	DF	Kagoshima United	
April	East A	Hiromu Kamada	Japan	MF	Vegalta Sendai	
April	East B	Gustavo Silva	Brazil	MF	Júbilo Iwata	
April	West A	Shunsuke Tanimoto	Japan	MF	Kataller Toyama	
April	West B	Yota Shimokawa	Japan	DF	Tegevajaro Miyazaki	
May	East A	Hayato Sugita	Japan	DF	Yokohama FC	
May	East B	Takuma Arano	Japan	MF	Hokkaido Consadole Sapporo	
May	West A	Shota Tamura	Japan	FW	Nara Club	
May	West B	Ryo Arita	Japan	FW	Kagoshima United	
