= 2023 J3 League =

10th season of the Japanese J3 League

Meiji Yasuda J3 League
- Season: 2023
- Dates: 4 March – 2 December
- Champions: Ehime FC; 1st J3 title 2nd D3 title
- Promoted: Ehime FC; Kagoshima United
- Matches: 380
- Goals: 930 (2.45 per match)
- Top goalscorer: Ren Komatsu (19 goals)
- Biggest home win: Giravanz Kitakyushu 6-1 Iwate Grulla Morioka (11 November); SC Sagamihara 5–0 FC Osaka (12 November)
- Biggest away win: Tegevajaro Miyazaki 0–6 Kataller Toyama (26 November)
- Highest scoring: Matsumoto Yamaga 5–3 SC Sagamihara (3 June)
- Longest winning run: Ehime FC (5 matches)
- Longest unbeaten run: Ehime FC (13 matches)
- Longest winless run: SC Sagamihara (15 matches)
- Longest losing run: Giravanz Kitakyushu (6 matches)
- Highest attendance: 12,458; Nagano Parceiro 2–1 Matsumoto Yamaga (13 May)
- Lowest attendance: 650; Azul Claro Numazu 0–1 Vanraure Hachinohe (18 March)
- Total attendance: 1,141,166
- Average attendance: 3,003

The 2023 J3 League, referred to as the 2023 Meiji Yasuda J3 League (Japanese: 2023 明治安田生命J3リーグ, Hepburn: 2023 Meiji Yasuda Seimei J3 Rīgu) for sponsorship reasons, was the 10th season of the J3 League under its current name.

== Changes from the previous season ==
Promoted from 2022 JFL	Promoted to 2023 J2 League	Relegated from 2022 J2 League
Nara Club; FC Osaka	Iwaki FC; Fujieda MYFC	FC Ryukyu; Iwate Grulla Morioka

Iwaki FC and Fujieda MYFC were promoted to the J2 League after being champions and runners-up of last season's J3.

FC Ryukyu and Iwate Grulla Morioka were relegated from the J2 League after relatively short stints at the 2nd division, with Ryukyu spending four seasons, and Iwate spending just a single season. The clubs finished as 21st and 22nd-placed team at the 2022 J2 League, respectively.

Nara Club and FC Osaka were promoted to the J3 League after being respectively, champions and runners-up of last season's JFL. Both teams are making their debut in the J3 League after obtaining a J.League License, to enable their promotion from the JFL.

This season is the first of the J3 League to have 20 teams, seeing an increase from last season's 18 teams. About the number of teams, there will be no future changes, as the J.League confirmed that from 2024, all the three professional leagues would have 20 teams in each.

== Overview ==
=== Promotion and relegation ===
This season was the first to feature promotion/relegation from the Japan Football League, enabling the possibility for teams to be relegated from the J3. The system of promotion/relegation between the leagues can be determined by the eligibility (Promotion to J3 requires a J.League license) of the JFL's champions and runners-up for the season.

- If only the JFL champions holds a license, there will be automatic promotion/relegation with the J3's 20th-placed team.
- If only the JFL runners-up holds a license, there will be promotion/relegation play-offs with the J3's 20th-placed team.
- If both the JFL champions and runners-up hold a license, there will be automatic promotion/relegation between the JFL champions and the J3's 20th-placed team, and promotion/relegation play-offs with the J3's 19th-placed team.
- If both the JFL champions and runners-up do not hold a license, no promotion/relegation between J3 and JFL will take place.

The dates and the host teams of the promotion/relegation play-off were pre-determined by the J.League. In case it happens, it will be played in two legs on 9 and 16 December, with the J3 team hosting the second leg.

== Participating clubs ==
Locations of the 2023 J3 League teams

Club name	Home town	Stadium	Capacity	Last season	Licence
Azul Claro Numazu	Numazu	Ashitaka Stadium	5,104	J3 (15th)	J2
Ehime FC	All cities/towns in Ehime (Note: centering on Matsuyama)	Ningineer Stadium	21,401	J3 (7th)	J1
Fukushima United	Fukushima	Toho Stadium	21,000	J3 (11th)	J1
Gainare Tottori	All cities/towns in Tottori (Note: centering on Tottori, Yonago, Kurayoshi, Sakaiminato)	Axis Bird Stadium	16,033	J3 (12th)	J2
FC Gifu	All cities/towns in Gifu (Note: centering on Gifu)	Gifu Nagaragawa Stadium	26,109	J3 (14th)	J1
Giravanz Kitakyushu	Kitakyushu, Fukuoka	Mikuni World Stadium Kitakyushu	15,066	J3 (13th)	J1
FC Imabari	Imabari	Imabari Satoyama Stadium	5,316	J3 (5th)	J2
Iwate Grulla Morioka	All cities/towns in Iwate	Iwagin Stadium & Kitakami Stadium	4,946	J2 (22nd; Relegated)	J1
Kagoshima United	Kagoshima	Shiranami Stadium	19,934	J3 (3rd)	J1
Kamatamare Sanuki	All cities/towns in Kagawa (Note: centering on Takamatsu, Marugame)	Pikara Stadium	30,099	J3 (17th)	J1
Kataller Toyama	All cities/towns in Toyama (Note: centering on Toyama)	Toyama Athletic Stadium	28,494	J3 (6th)	J1
Matsumoto Yamaga	Cities/towns in Nagano (Note: Matsumoto, Azumino, Yamagata, Shiojiri, Omachi, Ikeda, Ikusaka, Minowa, Asahi)	Sunpro Alwin	20,396	J3 (4th)	J1
Nagano Parceiro	Nagano	Nagano U Stadium	15,491	J3 (8th)	J2
Nara Club	All cities/towns on Nara	Rohto Field Nara	30,600	JFL (1st; Promoted)	J2
FC Osaka	Higashiōsaka, Osaka	Hanazono Rugby Stadium	27,346	JFL (2nd; Promoted)	J3
FC Ryukyu	All cities/towns in Okinawa	Tapic Kenso Hiyagon Stadium	12,270	J2 (21st; Relegated)	J1
SC Sagamihara	Sagamihara	Gion Stadium	15,300	J3 (18th)	J2
Tegevajaro Miyazaki	Miyazaki & Shintomi, Miyazaki	Unilever Stadium Shintomi	5,357	J3 (9th)	J2
Vanraure Hachinohe	Eastern cities/towns in Aomori (Note: Hachinohe, Towada, Gonohe, Sannohe, Takko, Hashikami, Nanbu, Shingo, Oirase, Misawa, Shichinohe, Rokunohe, Tohoku, Noheji, Yokohama, Rokkasho)	Prifoods Stadium	5,200	J3 (10th)	J2
YSCC Yokohama	Yokohama	Nippatsu Mitsuzawa Stadium	15,454	J3 (16th)	J2

=== Personnel and kits ===
Club	Manager	Captain	Kit manufacturer	Main shirt sponsor
Azul Claro Numazu	(Japan) Masashi Nakayama	(Japan) Takuya Sugai	(Brazil) Penalty	Usui
Ehime FC	(Japan) Kiyotaka Ishimaru	(Japan) Kenta Tokushige	(Japan) Jogarbola	Ningineer Network
Fukushima United	(Japan) Mitsumasa Yoda	(Japan) Shun Obu	(Denmark) Hummel	Toho Bank
Gainare Tottori	(Japan) Kohei Masumoto (IN)	(Japan) Koki Ishii	(Japan) Soccer Junky	San-in Godo Bank
FC Gifu	(Japan) Yusaku Ueno	(Japan) Yoshihiro Shoji	(Japan) Razzoli	Hot Staff
Giravanz Kitakyushu	(Japan) Kazuaki Tasaka	(Japan) Ryosuke Tada	(Brazil) Penalty	Toto
FC Imabari	(Japan) Naoto Kudo	(Japan) Keishi Kusumi	(Japan) Asics	Unicharm
Iwate Grulla Morioka	(Japan) Tetsuji Nakamikawa	(Japan) Atsutaka Nakamura	(Spain) Kelme	Nova
Kagoshima United	(Japan) Yasuaki Oshima	(Japan) Kenta Hirose	(Japan) Angua	Satsuma Shimabijin
Kamatamare Sanuki	(Japan) Atsushi Yoneyama		(Japan) Angua	Rexxam
Kataller Toyama	(Japan) Michiharu Otagiri	(Japan) Kosei Wakimoto	(Japan) Goldwin	YKK AP
Matsumoto Yamaga	(Japan) Masahiro Shimoda	(Japan) Akira Ando	(Germany) Adidas	Epson
Nagano Parceiro	(Japan) Riki Takagi	(Japan) Takuya Akiyama	(Brazil) Penalty	Hokto
Nara Club	(Spain) Julián Marín Bazalo	(Japan) Yuki Kotani	(Japan) Squadra	Daiwa House
FC Osaka	(Japan) Ryo Shigaki	(Japan) Shusuke Sakamoto	(Japan) bonera	OM-X
FC Ryukyu	(North Korea) Kim Jong-song	(Japan) Ryunosuke Noda	(Japan) sfida	GMO Coin
SC Sagamihara	(Japan) Kazuyuki Toda	(Japan) Akihiko Takeshige	(Japan) Gol.	Gion
Tegevajaro Miyazaki	(Japan) Mitsuo Kato	(Japan) Kenji Dai	(Japan) Yonex	Enatsu Shoji Holdings
Vanraure Hachinohe	(Japan) Nobuhiro Ishizaki	(Japan) Naoyuki Yamada	(Denmark) Hummel	Atmix
YSCC Yokohama	(Japan) Kazuki Kuranuki	(Japan) Kento Dodate	(Japan) Bonera	Sanshin

=== Managerial changes ===
Team	Outgoing	Manner	Exit date		Position in table	Incoming	Incoming date		Ref.
Team	Outgoing	Manner	Announced on	Departed on	Position in table	Incoming	Announced on	Arrived on	Ref.
FC Ryukyu	Kazuki Kuranuki	Sacked	16 May		17th	Tetsuhiro Kina	16 May		
Gainare Tottori	Kim Jong-song	Sacked	19 June		18th	Kohei Masumoto (interim)	20 June		
Fukushima United	Toshihiro Hattori	Sacked	12 July		18th	Mitsumasa Yoda	18 July		
FC Imabari	Riki Takagi	Sacked	15 August		6th	Naoto Kudo	16 August		
Kagoshima United	Naoto Otake	Sacked	22 August		5th	Yasuaki Oshima	23 August		
Nagano Parceiro	Yuki Richard Stalph	Sacked	27 August		15th	Riki Takagi	30 August		
YSCC Yokohama	Kei Hoshikawa	Sacked	28 August		18th	Kazuki Kuranuki	30 August		
Giravanz Kitakyushu	Kazuaki Tasaka	Resigned	5 September		20th	Shinji Kobayashi	5 September		
FC Ryukyu	Tetsuhiro Kina	Sacked	15 September		18th	Kim Jong-song	15 September		
Iwate Grulla Morioka	Yoshika Matsubara	Sacked	19 September		14th	Tetsuji Nakamikawa	20 September		
Tegevajaro Miyazaki	Hiroshi Matsuda	Sacked	26 September		17th	Mitsuo Kato	27 September		

== Foreign players ==
From the 2021 season onwards, there is no limitations on signing foreign players, but clubs could only register up to five of them for a single matchday squad. Players from J.League partner nations (Thailand, Vietnam, Myanmar, Malaysia, Cambodia, Singapore, Indonesia, and Qatar) were exempted from these restrictions.

- Players name in **bold** indicates the player is registered during the summer transfer window.
- Player's name in italics indicates the player has Japanese nationality in addition to their FIFA nationality, holds the nationality of a J.League partner nation, or is exempt from being treated as a foreign player due to having been born in Japan and being enrolled in, or having graduated from an approved type of school in the country.

Club	Player 1	Player 2	Player 3	Player 4	Player 5	Player 6	Left mid-season
Azul Claro Numazu	(Brazil) Igor Gabriel	(Brazil) Mikhael Akatsuka	(Brazil) Raul Sudati	(Chinese Taipei) Shunkun Tani			
Ehime FC	(Australia) Ben Duncan						
Fukushima United							
Gainare Tottori	(North Korea) Mun In-ju						
FC Gifu	(South Korea) Ono Cholhwan						
Giravanz Kitakyushu	(South Korea) Koh Seung-jin	(Nigeria) **Mikel Agu**	(Brazil) **Eduardo de Queiroz Melo**	(Nigeria) **Ikechukwu Eboko**			
FC Imabari	(Brazil) Marcus Índio	(Spain) Jon Ander Serantes	(South Korea) Park Soo-bin	(Netherlands) Ralf Seuntjens	(Poland) Filip Piszczek		(Brazil) Dudu
Iwate Grulla Morioka	(Brazil) Cristiano	(Brazil) Douglas Oliveira	(Hong Kong) Au Yeung Yiu Chung	(South Korea) Jang Hyun-soo	(Nigeria) Kenneth Otabor	(North Korea) Ri Yong-jik	
Kagoshima United	(Brazil) Weslley						
Kamatamare Sanuki							
Kataller Toyama	(Brazil) Arthur Silva	(Brazil) Gabriel Nascimento	(Brazil) Matheus Leiria				
Matsumoto Yamaga	(Brazil) Lucas Rian	(Brazil) Paulinho	(Spain) Víctor Ibáñez				
Nagano Parceiro	(Indonesia) Ryu Nugraha	(South Korea) Kim Min-ho					
Nara Club	(Spain) Arnau Riera						
FC Osaka	(South Korea) Woo Sang-ho						(Brazil) Efrain Rintaro (Brazil) João Victor (Brazil) Maykon Douglas (Cameroon) Jean Marie Dongou
FC Ryukyu	(Brazil) Kelvin	(South Korea) Cho Eun-su	(South Korea) Jeon Ji-wan	(Costa Rica) Danny Carvajal	(Ghana) Sadam Sulley		
SC Sagamihara							
Tegevajaro Miyazaki							
Vanraure Hachinohe	(Nigeria) **Oriola Sunday**						
YSCC Yokohama	(Ecuador) Carlos Arroyo	(Luxembourg) Loris Tinelli	(Nigeria) Promise Ugochukwu				

== League table ==
Pos	Team	Pld	W	D	L	GF	GA	GD	Pts	Promotion or relegation
1	Ehime FC (C, P)	38	21	10	7	59	48	+11	73	Promotion to the J2 League (Note: Only teams that hold a J2 license are eligible for promotion.)
2	Kagoshima United (P)	38	18	8	12	58	41	+17	62	Promotion to the J2 League
3	Kataller Toyama	38	19	5	14	59	48	+11	62	
4	FC Imabari	38	16	11	11	54	42	+12	59	
5	Nara Club	38	15	12	11	45	32	+13	57	
6	Gainare Tottori	38	14	14	10	57	52	+5	56	
7	Vanraure Hachinohe	38	15	11	12	49	47	+2	56	
8	FC Gifu	38	14	12	12	44	35	+9	54	
9	Matsumoto Yamaga	38	15	9	14	51	47	+4	54	
10	Iwate Grulla Morioka	38	15	9	14	48	49	−1	54	
11	FC Osaka (Note: The team does not hold either a J1 or J2 license, and so is ineligible for promotion to the J2 League.)	38	14	11	13	41	38	+3	53	
12	YSCC Yokohama	38	14	10	14	48	50	−2	52	
13	Azul Claro Numazu	38	15	6	17	48	48	0	51	
14	Nagano Parceiro	38	13	11	14	52	60	−8	50	
15	Fukushima United	38	12	11	15	37	42	−5	47	
16	Kamatamare Sanuki	38	11	11	16	29	45	−16	44	
17	FC Ryukyu	38	12	7	19	43	61	−18	43	
18	SC Sagamihara	38	9	14	15	44	48	−4	41	
19	Tegevajaro Miyazaki	38	9	12	17	31	52	−21	39	
20	Giravanz Kitakyushu	38	7	10	21	33	45	−12	31	

Source: Meiji Yasuda J3 League, J.League Data Site
Rules for classification: 1) Points; 2) Goal difference; 3) Goals scored; 4) Head-to-head points; 5) Head-to-head goal difference; 6) Head-to-head goal scored; 7) Fair-play points.
(C) Champions; (P) Promoted

== Stadiums ==
Primary venues to be used in the 2023 J3 League season:

Azul Claro Numazu	Ehime FC	Fukushima United	Gainare Tottori	FC Gifu	Giravanz Kitakyushu	FC Imabari
Ashitaka Park Stadium	Ningineer Stadium	Toho Stadium	Axis Bird Stadium	Gifu Nagaragawa Stadium	Mikuni World Stadium Kitakyushu	ASICS Satoyama Stadium
Capacity: 10,000	Capacity: 21,401	Capacity: 21,000	Capacity: 16,310	Capacity: 11,999	Capacity: 15,300	Capacity: 5,316
Iwate Grulla Morioka	Kagoshima United	Kamatamare Sanuki	Kataller Toyama	Matsumoto Yamaga	Nagano Parceiro	Nara Club
Iwagin Stadium	Shiranami Stadium	Pikara Stadium	Toyama Stadium	Sunpro Alwin	Nagano U Stadium	Rohto Field Nara
Capacity: 4,946	Capacity: 12,606	Capacity: 22,338	Capacity: 18,588	Capacity: 20,000	Capacity: 15,515	Capacity: 30,600
FC Osaka	FC Ryukyu	SC Sagamihara	Tegevajaro Miyazaki	Vanraure Hachinohe	YSCC Yokohama	All J3 stadiums
Hanazono Rugby Stadium	Tapic Kenso Hiyagon Stadium	Sagamihara Gion Stadium	Unilever Stadium Shintomi	Prifoods Stadium	Nippatsu Mitsuzawa Stadium	All J3 stadiums
Capacity: 27,346	Capacity: 12,270	Capacity: 15,300	Capacity: 5,354	Capacity: 5,124	Capacity: 15,440	All J3 stadiums

== Season statistics ==
=== Goal contributions ===
==== Top scorers ====
Rank	Player	Club	Goals
1	(Japan) Ren Komatsu	Matsumoto Yamaga	19
2	(Japan) Hayato Asakawa	Nara Club	16
3	(Japan) Noah Kenshin Browne	Azul Claro Numazu	12
3	(Japan) Riki Matsuda	Ehime FC	12
5	(Japan) Sho Fukuda	YSCC Yokohama	11
5	(Japan) Ryunosuke Noda	FC Ryukyu	11
5	(Japan) Masashi Wada	Iwate Grulla Morioka	11

==== Top assists ====
Rank	Player	Club	Assists
1	(Japan) Yusuke Kikui	Matsumoto Yamaga	9
1	(Brazil) Marcus Índio	FC Imabari	9
1	(Japan) Shunsuke Motegi	Ehime FC	9
4	(Japan) Kaili Shimbo	Iwate Grulla Morioka	8
5	(Japan) Noah Kenshin Browne	Azul Claro Numazu	7
5	(Japan) Nao Eguchi	Kamatamare Sanuki	7
5	(Japan) Kotaro Tokunaga	Azul Claro Numazu	7

==== Clean sheets ====
Rank	Player	Club	C.S.
1	(Japan) Tatsunari Nagai	FC Osaka	16
2	(Japan) Kenta Tanno	Iwate Grulla Morioka	12
3	(Japan) Jun Kodama	YSCC Yokohama	9
3	(Japan) Shinji Okada	Nara Club	9
3	(Japan) Yusuke Taniguchi	Vanraure Hachinohe	9

=== Discipline ===
==== Player ====
- Most yellow cards: 11
  - (Japan) Takahiro Nakazato (YSCC Yokohama)
- Most red cards: 2
  - (Japan) Ayumu Matsumoto (FC Gifu)
  - (Brazil) Marcus Índio (FC Imabari)

==== Club ====
- Most yellow cards: 65 (FC Ryukyu)
- Most red cards: 4 (FC Gifu)

== Awards ==
=== Monthly awards ===
Month	Manager of the Month		Monthly MVP		Goal of the Month		References
Month	Manager	Club	Player	Club	Player	Club	References
February/March	(Japan) Yoshika Matsubara	Iwate Grulla Morioka	(Japan) Tsuyoshi Miyaichi	Iwate Grulla Morioka	(Brazil) Kelvin	FC Ryukyu	
April	(Spain) Julián Marín Bazalo	Nara Club	(Japan) Hayato Asakawa	Nara Club	(Japan) Ren Komatsu	Matsumoto Yamaga	
May	(Japan) Naoto Otake	Kagoshima United	(Japan) Sho Fukuda	YSCC Yokohama	(Japan) Rio Yoshitake	SC Sagamihara	
June	(Japan) Yusako Ueno	FC Gifu	(Japan) Yoji Sasaki	Kataller Toyama	(Japan) Haruto Shirai	FC Ryukyu	
July	(Japan) Kiyotaka Ishimaru	Ehime FC	(Japan) Shumpei Fukahori	Ehime FC	(Japan) Takahiro Kitsui	FC Osaka	
August	(Japan) Mitsumasa Yoda	Fukushima United	(Japan) Charles Nduka	FC Gifu	(Japan) Shunsuke Tanimoto	Ehime FC	
September	(Japan) Yasuaki Oshima	Kagoshima United	(Japan) Takahiro Kitsui	FC Osaka	(Japan) Nobuyuki Shiina	Kataller Toyama	
October	(Japan) Kazuki Kuranuki	YSCC Yokohama	(Japan) Rei Yonezawa	Kagoshima United	(Japan) Yuma Funabashi	AC Nagano Parceiro	
November/December	(Japan) Nobuhiro Ishizaki	Vanraure Hachinohe	(Brazil) Matheus Leiria	Kataller Toyama	(Japan) Tatsuma Sakai	Nara Club	

== See also ==
National association

- Japan Football Association (JFA)

League

- Japanese association football league system
  - J.League
    - 2023 J1 League
    - 2023 J2 League
  - 2023 Japan Football League

Cup

- 2023 Emperor's Cup (national open cup)
