= Marlyson =

Brazilian footballer

Personal information
- Full name: Marlyson Conceição Oliveira
- Date of birth: 13 January 1999 (age 27)
- Place of birth: Rosário, Brazil
- Height: 1.78 m (5 ft 10 in)
- Position: Forward

Team information
- Current team: Brusque
- Number: 9

Youth career
- Itapecuruense
- Joinville

Senior career*
Years	Team	Apps	(Gls)
2017–2019	Joinville	39	(5)
2019	Ponte Preta	5	(0)
2019	→ Paraná (loan)	3	(1)
2020	São Bernardo	17	(8)
2020	Boa	9	(1)
2021	XV de Piracicaba	14	(3)
2021–2025	Figueirense	43	(18)
2021	→ Metalist 1925 Kharkiv (loan)	14	(5)
2022–2023	→ Vorskla Poltava (loan)	11	(3)
2024	→ Zweigen Kanazawa (loan)	25	(5)
2026	Noroeste	19	(8)
2026–	Brusque	12	(4)
- * Club domestic league appearances and goals as of 9 November 2026

Marlyson Conceição Oliveira (born 13 January 1999) is a Brazilian professional footballer who plays as a forward for Brusque.

== Career statistics ==
As of match played 22 February 2025

Appearances and goals by club, season and competition
Club	Season	League			State league		National cup (Note: Appearance(s) in Copa do Brasil, Ukrainian Cup, Emperor's Cup)		Continental		Other		Total	
Club	Season	Division	Apps	Goals	Apps	Goals	Apps	Goals	Apps	Goals	Apps	Goals	Apps	Goals
Joinville	2017	Série C	3	0	13 (Note: Appearance(s) in Campeonato Catarinense)	3	5	2	—		1 (Note: Appearance(s) in Primeira Liga)	0	22	5
Joinville	2018	Série C	10	1	12	1	1	0	—		—		23	2
Joinville	Total		13	1	25	4	6	2	0	0	1	0	55	7
Ponte Preta	2019	Série B	0	0	5 (Note: Appearance(s) in Campeonato Paulista Série A1)	0	0	0	—		—		5	0
Paraná (loan)	2019	Série B	3	1	0	0	0	0	—		—		3	1
São Bernardo	2020	—			17 (Note: Appearance(s) in Campeonato Paulista Série A2)	8	—		—		—		17	8
Boa	2020	Série C	9	1	0	0	0	0	—		—		9	1
XV de Piracicaba	2021	—			14	3	—		—		—		14	3
Figueirense	2021	Série C	2	0	0	0	0	0	—		—		2	0
Figueirense	2022	Série C	8	2	0	0	0	0	—		—		8	2
Figueirense	2023	Série C	0	0	0	0	—		—		—		0	0
Figueirense	2024	Série C	0	0	0	0	—		—		—		0	0
Figueirense	2025	Série C	0	0	10	5	—		—		—		10	5
Figueirense	Total		10	2	10	5	0	0	0	0	0	0	20	7
Metalist 1925 Kharkiv (loan)	2021-22	Ukrainian Premier League	14	5	—		1	0	—		—		15	5
Vorskla Poltava (loan)	2022-23	Ukrainian Premier League	11	3	—		—		2 (Note: Appearance(s) in UEFA Europa Conference League)	0	—		13	3
Zweigen Kanazawa (loan)	2024	J3 League	26	5	—		0	0	—		1 (Note: Appearance(s) in J.League Cup)	0	27	5
Career total			86	18	71	20	7	2	2	0	2	0	168	40
