= Ryo Arita =

Japanese footballer

Ryo Arita 有田 稜
Personal information
- Date of birth: 28 August 1999 (age 27)
- Place of birth: Fukuoka Prefecture, Japan
- Height: 1.85 m (6 ft 1 in)
- Position: Forward

Team information
- Current team: Kagoshima United
- Number: 9

Youth career
- Tobata FC
- FC.Neo
- 2015–2017: Kokura Kogyo High School

College career
| Years | Team | Apps | (Gls) |
| 2018–2022 | Kokushikan University | | |

Senior career*
| Years | Team | Apps | (Gls) |
| 2022–2023 | Iwaki FC | 70 | (20) |
| 2024–2025 | Montedio Yamagata | 10 | (1) |
| 2024 | → Kagoshima United (loan) | 14 | (1) |
| 2025 | → Renofa Yamaguchi (loan) | 29 | (3) |
| 2026– | Kagoshima United | 18 | (5) |
- * Club domestic league appearances and goals as of 18 August 2026

Ryo Arita (有田 稜, Arita Ryo; born 28 August 1999) is a Japanese professional footballer who plays as a forward for J3 League club Kagoshima United.

== Youth career ==
Arita played for his high school between 2015 and 2017, before going on to play for Kokushikan University. In his second year, he was registered as a member of their squad to compete in Kanto Division 2 and made his first appearance as a substitute in a 3–1 win over Kanto Gakuin University. In his third year, Arita appeared four times for Kokushikan and he scored his first goal for the team in a 3–3 draw with Komazawa University, after only coming on as a substitute in the 85th minute. In his fourth and final year, Arita played a much bigger role for the university and scored 10 goals in 16 games in Kanto Division 1. This included a hattrick in a 2–3 victory over Hosei University. He also made his first appearances in the Japan Inter College Tournament, playing three games before being knocked out at the quarter-final stage.

== Club career ==
In December 2021, it was announced that Arita would be signing for newly promoted J3 League team Iwaki FC for the 2022 season. He scored a last-minute winner on his debut in the third league game of the season – a 2–1 victory over Ehime FC. Arita continued to be used as a substitute throughout the first half of the season and had to wait until June for his first start. In spite of his limited game time, he managed to score 4 goals before the end of July. By August, he had forced his way into the starting line-up. Following three goals and an assist in four games helping Iwaki to an unbeaten month, Arita was awarded the J3 Monthly MVP award for August.

At the end of the 2022 season, Arita had helped Iwaki gain promotion to the J2 League for the first time in their history contributing with 17 goals in 31 matches. He finished the season as top scorer in the J3 League, with 9 goals coming in his last 8 games of the season. For his efforts, he was awarded the inaugural J3 MVP award for the 2022 season, inducted into the 2022 J3 Best XI and picked up his second Monthly MVP award for October/November. On 12 December 2022, Arita renewed his contract with the club for the upcoming 2023 season.

Following an excellent first season with Iwaki, Arita continued to be a major part of the squad in his second season and his first in the J2 League. He made 40 appearances across all competitions and scored three goals.

In December 2023, it was announced that Arita would be transferring to Montedio Yamagata.

Mid-way through his debut season in July 2024, Arita moved on loan to fellow J2 League club Kagoshima United until end of the season.

At the end of the 2024 season, Arita was transferred on loan to Renofa Yamaguchi ahead of the 2025 season.

In December 2025, it was announced that Arita would be moving on a permanent deal back to Kagoshima United.

== Career statistics ==
As of 2 March 2026.

Appearances and goals by club, season and competition
| Club | Season | League | | | Emperor's Cup | | J.League Cup | | Total | |
| Club | Season | Division | Apps | Goals | Apps | Goals | Apps | Goals | Apps | Goals |
|---|---|---|---|---|---|---|---|---|---|---|
| Iwaki FC | 2022 | J3 League | 31 | 17 | 0 | 0 | — | | 31 | 17 |
| Iwaki FC | 2023 | J2 League | 39 | 3 | 1 | 0 | — | | 40 | 3 |
| Iwaki FC | Total | | 70 | 20 | 1 | 0 | 0 | 0 | 71 | 20 |
| Montedio Yamagata | 2024 | J2 League | 10 | 1 | 2 | 0 | 1 | 0 | 13 | 1 |
| Kagoshima United (loan) | 2024 | J2 League | 14 | 1 | 0 | 0 | — | | 14 | 1 |
| Renofa Yamaguchi (loan) | 2025 | J2 League | 29 | 3 | 0 | 0 | 2 | 0 | 31 | 3 |
| Kagoshima United | 2026 | J2/J3 (100) | 1 | 0 | — | | — | | 1 | 0 |
| Career total | | | 124 | 25 | 3 | 0 | 3 | 0 | 130 | 25 |

== Honours ==
=== Club ===
Iwaki FC

- J3 League : 2022

=== Individual ===
- J3 Monthly MVP (2): August 2022, October/November 2022
- J3 League Top Scorer: 2022
- J3 MVP Award: 2022
- J3 League Best XI: 2022
