= Keishi Kusumi =

Japanese footballer

Keishi Kusumi 楠美 圭史
Personal information
- Full name: Keishi Kusumi
- Date of birth: 25 July 1994 (age 32)
- Place of birth: Mitaka, Tokyo, Japan
- Height: 1.77 m (5 ft 9 1/2 in)
- Position: Midfielder

Team information
- Current team: FC Imabari
- Number: 25

Youth career
- 2007–2012: Tokyo Verdy

Senior career*
Years	Team	Apps	(Gls)
2013–2016	Tokyo Verdy	15	(0)
2015	→ Verspah Oita (loan)	13	(0)
2017–	FC Imabari	195	(6)
- * Club domestic league appearances and goals as of 28 September 2024, 12:24 (UTC)

Keishi Kusumi (楠美 圭史, Kusumi Keishi; born 25 July 1994 in Mitaka, Tokyo) is a Japanese footballer who plays as a midfielder for J2 League club FC Imabari.

== Club statistics ==
As of 28 September 2024

Appearances and goals by club, season and competition
Club	Season	League			National Cup		League Cup		Total	
Club	Season	Division	Apps	Goals	Apps	Goals	Apps	Goals	Apps	Goals
Japan			League		Emperor's Cup		J. League Cup		Total	
Tokyo Verdy	2013	J2 League	1	0	0	0	–		1	0
Tokyo Verdy	2014	J2 League	5	0	0	0	–		5	0
Tokyo Verdy	2016	J2 League	9	0	1	0	–		10	0
Tokyo Verdy	Total		15	0	1	0	0	0	16	0
Verspah Oita (loan)	2015	JFL	13	0	2	0	–		15	0
Verspah Oita (loan)	Total		13	0	2	0	0	0	15	0
FC Imabari	2017	JFL	21	2	1	0	–		22	2
FC Imabari	2018	JFL	24	0	2	0	–		26	0
FC Imabari	2019	JFL	29	1	0	0	–		29	1
FC Imabari	2020	J3 League	31	0	0	0	–		31	0
FC Imabari	2021	J3 League	26	3	1	0	–		27	3
FC Imabari	2022	J3 League	32	0	1	0	–		33	0
FC Imabari	2023	J3 League	25	0	2	0	–		27	0
FC Imabari	2024	J3 League	8	0	1	0	0	0	9	0
FC Imabari	Total		196	6	8	0	0	0	204	6
Career total			224	6	11	0	0	0	235	6
