= Shawn van Eerden =

Japanese footballer (born 2004)

Personal information
- Full name: Shawn Tyler Nozawa van Eerden
- Date of birth: 16 April 2004 (age 22)
- Place of birth: Fujisawa, Japan
- Height: 1.93 m (6 ft 4 in)
- Position: Defender

Team information
- Current team: Gainare Tottori
- Number: 3

Youth career
- –2023: Yokohama FC

Senior career*
Years	Team	Apps	(Gls)
2023–2026	Yokohama FC	0	(0)
2024	→ YSCC Yokohama (loan)	15	(1)
2025	→ Gainare Tottori (loan)	5	(0)
2026–	Gainare Tottori	7	(0)

International career
- Japan U18
- * Club domestic league appearances and goals as of 24 August 2026

Shawn Tyler Nozawa van Eerden (Japanese: ヴァン イヤーデン ショーン; born 16 April 2004) is a Japanese professional footballer who plays as a defender for Gainare Tottori.

== Early life ==
Van Eerden was born on 16 April 2004 in Fujisawa, Japan and is a native of the city. Born to a Canadian father and a Japanese mother, he was childhood friends with Japan international Kōta Takai.

== Club career ==
As a youth player, van Eerden joined the youth academy of Yokohama FC and was promoted to the club's senior team in 2023. On 24 May 2023, he debuted for the club during a 1–0 home win over Sanfrecce Hiroshima in the J.League Cup.

Ahead of the 2024 season, he was sent on loan to YSCC Yokohama. On 24 March 2024, he debuted for the club during a 1–1 home draw with Gainare Tottori in the league. On 31 March 2024, he scored his first goal for the club during a 1–0 away win over Fukushima United FC in the league.

== International career ==
Van Eerden is a Japan youth international and is eligible to represent Canada internationally through his father. During the summer of 2022, he played for the Japan national under-18 football team at the 2022 SBS Cup.

== Style of play ==
Van Eerden plays as a defender and is right-footed. Japanese newspaper Tokyo Sports wrote in 2023 that "his strengths are his aerial battles, which he makes the most of at 193 cm tall, and his strength around the ball".
