= Noah Kenshin Browne =

Japanese footballer (born 2001)

Noah Kenshin Browne ブラウン ノア 賢信
Personal information
- Full name: Noah Kenshin Browne
- Date of birth: 27 May 2001 (age 25)
- Place of birth: Montreal, Quebec, Canada
- Height: 1.89 m (6 ft 2 in)
- Position: Forward

Team information
- Current team: Fagiano Okayama
- Number: 79

Youth career
- Akamatsu Phoenix FC
- Vitoria Meguro FC
- –2019: Yokohama F. Marinos

Senior career*
Years	Team	Apps	(Gls)
2019–2020	Yokohama F. Marinos	0	(0)
2020	→ Kamatamare Sanuki (loan)	22	(2)
2021–2022	Mito HollyHock	11	(0)
2021	→ Azul Claro Numazu (loan)	5	(0)
2022–2023	Azul Claro Numazu	66	(15)
2024	Tokushima Vortis	34	(7)
2025–	Fagiano Okayama	20	(2)
2025	→ Júbilo Iwata (loan)	7	(1)

International career
2016	Japan U15	3	(1)
2017	Japan U16	4	(1)
2018	Japan U17	3	(3)
- * Club domestic league appearances and goals as of 8 November 2026

Noah Kenshin Browne (ブラウン ノア 賢信, Buraun Noa Kenshin; born May 27, 2001) is a professional footballer who playing as a forward and currently play for Fagiano Okayama. Born in Canada, Browne represented Japan at youth international level.

== Career ==
=== Yokohama F. Marinos ===
Browne was registered as a Class 2 player on 1 February 2019. He made his debut against Shonan Bellmare in the J.League Cup on 13 March 2019. Browne was promoted to the first team for the 2020 season.

=== Loan to Kamatamare Sanuki ===
Browne joined Kamatamare Sanuki on loan in 2020. He made his league debut against Gamba Osaka U-23 on 28 June 2020. Browne scored his first league goal against Vanraure Hachinohe on 27 September 2020, scoring in the 4th minute.

=== Mito Hollyhock ===
On 5 January 2021, Browne joined Mito Hollyhock. He made his league debut against Júbilo Iwata on 13 March 2021.

=== Loan to Azul Claro Numazu ===
Browne joined Azul Claro Numazu on a development type loan. He made his league debut against Imabari on 29 August 2021.

=== Azul Claro Numazu ===
Browne joined Azul Claro Numazu permanently in 2022. He made his league debut against Sagamihara on 12 March 2022. Browne scored his first league goal against Giravanz Kitakyushu on 10 April 2022, scoring in the 90th minute.

=== Tokushima Vortis ===
Browne joined Tokushima Vortis. He made his league debut against Ventforet Kofu on 25 February 2024. Browne scored his first league goal against Fujieda MYFC on 20 April 2024, scoring a penalty in the 39th minute.

=== Fagiano Okayama ===
On 30 December 2024, Browne was announced at newly promoted J1 club Fagiano Okayama.

== International career ==
Browne was selected for the Japan U15s.

Browne was called up as a training partner for the 2017 FIFA U-17 World Cup.

== Career statistics ==
=== Club ===
As of the start from 2025 season.

Club	Season	League			National Cup		League Cup		Continental		Other		Total	
Club	Season	Division	Apps	Goals	Apps	Goals	Apps	Goals	Apps	Goals	Apps	Goals	Apps	Goals
Yokohama F. Marinos	2019	J1 League	0	0	0	0	1 (Note: Appearances in the J. League Cup)	0	—		0	0	1	0
Yokohama F. Marinos	2020	J1 League	0	0	0	0	0	0	—		0	0	0	0
Yokohama F. Marinos	Total		0	0	0	0	1	0	0	0	0	0	1	0
Kamatamare Sanuki	2020	J3 League	22	2	0	0	–				0	0	22	2
Kamatamare Sanuki	Total		22	2	0	0	0	0	0	0	0	0	22	2
Mito HollyHock	2021	J2 League	11	0	1 (Note: Appearances in the Emperor's Cup)	0	–				0	0	12	0
Mito HollyHock	2022	J2 League	0	0	0	0	–				0	0	0	0
Mito HollyHock	Total		11	0	1	0	0	0	0	0	0	0	12	0
Azul Claro Numazu (loan)	2021	J3 League	5	0	0	0	–				0	0	5	0
Azul Claro Numazu	2022	J3 League	29	2	0	0	–				0	0	29	2
Azul Claro Numazu	2023	J3 League	37	13	1	1	–				0	0	38	14
Azul Claro Numazu	Total		71	15	1	1	0	0	0	0	0	0	72	16
Tokushima Vortis	2024	J2 League	38	7	2	0	1	0	–		0	0	41	7
Tokushima Vortis	Total		38	7	2	0	1	0	0	0	0	0	41	7
Fagiano Okayama	2025	J1 League	0	0	0	0	0	0	–		0	0	0	0
Fagiano Okayama	Total		0	0	0	0	0	0	0	0	0	0	0	0
Career total			142	24	4	1	2	0	0	0	0	0	148	25
