= Kosuke Fujioka =

Japanese footballer

Kosuke Fujioka 藤岡 浩介
Personal information
- Date of birth: 13 August 1994 (age 32)
- Place of birth: Yamaguchi, Japan
- Height: 1.74 m (5 ft 9 in)
- Position: Forward

Team information
- Current team: Renofa Yamaguchi FC
- Number: 11

Youth career
- FC Koyagawa
- 2007–2009: Nissho Gakuen Junior High School
- 2010–2012: Nissho Gakuen High School

Senior career*
Years	Team	Apps	(Gls)
2013–2016	Fagiano Okayama Next	88	(21)
2017–2021	Tegevajaro Miyazaki	93	(22)
2022–2024	FC Gifu	106	(38)
2025	FC Imabari	20	(0)
2026–	Renofa Yamaguchi FC	15	(2)
- * Club domestic league appearances and goals as of 21 August 2026

Kosuke Fujioka (藤岡 浩介, Fujioka Kosuke; born 13 August 1994) is a Japanese footballer currently playing as a forward for Renofa Yamaguchi FC.

== Early life ==
Fujioka was born in Yamaguchi. He played for FC Koyagawa, Nissho Gakuen Junior and Senior High School during his youth.

== Career ==
Fujioka made his debut for Gifu against YSCC Yokohama on 12 March 2022. He scored his first goal for the club against Gainare Tottori on 18 May 2022, scoring in the 59th minute. Fujioka officially top scorer of 2024 J3 League total 19 goals share with Marcus Indio of FC Imabari.

On 23 December 2024, Fujioka announcement officially transfer to J2 League promoted club, FC Imabari from 2025 season after departure from FC Gifu in 2 years.

== Career statistics ==
=== Club ===
As of the start from 2025 season.

Club	Season	League			National Cup		League Cup		Other		Total	
Club	Season	Division	Apps	Goals	Apps	Goals	Apps	Goals	Apps	Goals	Apps	Goals
Fagiano Okayama Next	2013	Chūgoku Soccer League	9	7	2 (Note: Appearances in the Emperor's Cup)	0	–		0	0	11	7
Fagiano Okayama Next	2014	JFL	26	5	2	0	–		0	0	28	5
Fagiano Okayama Next	2015	JFL	27	5	1	0	–		0	0	28	5
Fagiano Okayama Next	2016	JFL	26	4	1	0	–		0	0	27	4
Fagiano Okayama Next	Total		88	21	6	0	0	0	0	0	94	21
Tegevajaro Miyazaki	2017	Kyushu Soccer League	20	3	0	0	–		6 (Note: Appearances in the Japanese Regional Football League Competition)	3	26	6
Tegevajaro Miyazaki	2018	JFL	26	4	2	1	–		0	0	28	5
Tegevajaro Miyazaki	2019	JFL	19	5	0	0	–		0	0	19	5
Tegevajaro Miyazaki	2020	JFL	15	4	0	0	–		0	0	15	4
Tegevajaro Miyazaki	2021	J3 League	28	10	0	0	–		0	0	28	10
Tegevajaro Miyazaki	Total		108	26	2	1	0	0	6	3	116	30
FC Gifu	2022	J3 League	32	16	1	1	–		0	0	33	17
FC Gifu	2023	J3 League	38	3	1	1	–		0	0	39	4
FC Gifu	2024	J3 League	36	19	2	1	1	0	0	0	39	20
FC Gifu	Total		106	38	4	3	1	0	0	0	111	41
FC Imabari	2025	J2 League	0	0	0	0	0	0	0	0	0	0
FC Imabari	Total		0	0	0	0	0	0	0	0	0	0
Career total			302	85	12	4	1	0	6	3	321	92

== Honours ==
Individual

- J3 League Best XI: 2024
- J3 League Top scorer: 2024
