= Yuma Funabashi =

Japanese footballer

Personal information
- Date of birth: 13 November 1997 (age 28)
- Place of birth: Tokyo, Japan
- Height: 1.78 m (5 ft 10 in)
- Position: Defender

Team information
- Current team: FC Ryukyu
- Number: 27

Youth career
- Higashi Iko SSS
- FC Proud
- 2013–2015: JEFA FC

College career
Years	Team	Apps	(Gls)
2016–2019	Edogawa University		

Senior career*
Years	Team	Apps	(Gls)
2020–2022	YSCC Yokohama	56	(2)
2022–2023	Nagano Parceiro	45	(5)
2024–2025	Thespa Gunma	13	(1)
2026–	FC Ryukyu	19	(1)
- * Club domestic league appearances and goals as of 25 August 2026

Yuma Funabashi (船橋 勇真, Funabashi Yuma; born 13 November 1997) is a Japanese footballer currently playing as a defender for FC Ryukyu.

== Career statistics ==
=== Club ===
As of 9 July 2021.

Club	Season	League			National Cup		League Cup		Other		Total	
Club	Season	Division	Apps	Goals	Apps	Goals	Apps	Goals	Apps	Goals	Apps	Goals
YSCC Yokohama	2020	J3 League	20	0	0	0	–		0	0	20	0
YSCC Yokohama	2020	J3 League	12	0	2 (Note: Appearances in the Emperor's Cup)	0	–		0	0	14	0
Career total			42	0	2	0	0	0	0	0	44	0
