= Julián Marín =

Spanish football manager (born 1989)

Personal information
- Full name: Julián Marín Bazalo
- Date of birth: 13 June 1989 (age 37)
- Place of birth: Barcelona, Spain

Team information
- Current team: RB Omiya Ardija (assistant)

Managerial career
- Years: Team
- 2006–2012: Sant Cugat (youth)
- 2012–2015: Sant Cugat
- 2016–2017: Sabadell (assistant)
- 2017–2018: Thailand U21
- 2021–2024: Nara Club
- 2025: Malmö FF (assistant)
- 2025–2026: Cultural Leonesa (assistant)
- 2026–: RB Omiya Ardija (assistant)

Julian Marín Bazalo (born 13 June 1989) is a Spanish football manager who is currently the assistant manager of J2 League club RB Omiya Ardija. Besides Spain, he has managed in Japan, Sweden, and Thailand.

== Career ==
Before the 2021 season, Marín was appointed manager of Japanese fourth tier side Nara Club. In 2022, he helped them earn promotion to the Japanese third tier for the first time in their history.

Marín achieved a fifth-placed finish in the 2023 J3 League season, but struggled in the 2024 season and was dismissed on 4 September 2024 with the club in 18th place.

== Managerial statistics ==
As of 4 September 2024

Managerial record by team and tenure
Team	From	To	Record								Ref.
Team	From	To	P	W	D	L	GF	GA	GD	Win %	Ref.
Nara Club	10 December 2020	4 September 2024	121	44	44	33	158	139	+19	36.36	
Total			121	44	44	33	158	139	+19	36.36	
