= Takuya Sugai =

Japanese footballer (born 1991)

Takuya Sugai 菅井 拓也
Personal information
- Full name: Takuya Sugai
- Date of birth: August 2, 1991 (age 35)
- Place of birth: Sendai, Miyagi, Japan
- Height: 1.70 m (5 ft 7 in)
- Position: Defender

Team information
- Current team: Azul Claro Numazu
- Number: 15

Youth career
- 2004–2006: Vegalta Sendai
- 2007–2009: Seiwa Gakuen High School

College career
Years	Team	Apps	(Gls)
2010–2013	Sendai University		

Senior career*
Years	Team	Apps	(Gls)
2014–2016	Vanraure Hachinohe	84	(5)
2017–	Azul Claro Numazu	214	(11)
- * Club domestic league appearances and goals as of 1 January 2026

Takuya Sugai (菅井 拓也, Sugai Takuya; born August 2, 1991) is a Japanese football player. He plays for Azul Claro Numazu.

== Career ==
Takuya Sugai joined Japan Football League club Vanraure Hachinohe in 2014. In 2017, he moved to J3 League club Azul Claro Numazu.

== Career statistics ==
Updated to 14 April 2020.

Appearances and goals by club, season and competition
Club	Season	League			Emperor's Cup		Total	
Club	Season	Division	Apps	Goals	Apps	Goals	Apps	Goals
Vanraure Hachinohe	2014	JFL	25	3	2	0	27	3
Vanraure Hachinohe	2015	JFL	29	2	1	0	30	2
Vanraure Hachinohe	2016	JFL	30	0	1	0	31	0
Azul Claro Numazu	2017	J3 League	25	1	2	0	27	1
Azul Claro Numazu	2018	J3 League	12	0	–		12	0
Azul Claro Numazu	2019	J3 League	9	0	–		9	0
Career total			130	6	6	0	136	6
