= Riki Takagi =

Japanese footballer and manager

Riki Takagi 髙木 理己
Personal information
- Full name: Riki Takagi
- Date of birth: 13 July 1978 (age 48)
- Place of birth: Chiba, Japan
- Height: 1.80 m (5 ft 11 in)

Youth career
- 1994–1996: Funabashi Municipal High School

College career
Years	Team	Apps	(Gls)
1997–1999	Teikyo University		

Managerial career
- 2017–2018: Gainare Tottori U-18
- 2019–2021: Gainare Tottori
- 2023: FC Imabari
- 2023-2024: Nagano Parceiro

Riki Takagi (髙木 理己, Takagi Riki; born July 13, 1978) is a Japanese football manager.

== Club career ==
After featuring for both Funabashi Municipal High School and the Teikyo University, Takagi opted to retire and pursue a coaching career from the upcoming year.

== Managerial career ==
He faced a decade as a coach in three different high schools, only to end up at Kyoto Sanga in 2011: under the guide of Takeshi Oki, he worked as an assistant coach from 2011 to 2013.

The year after, he found a new job at Gainare Tottori, where he stayed two years before joining Shonan Bellmare. Nevertheless, he stayed just one year in Hiratsuka, since Gainare Tottori offered him a new job at the club, this time as the coach of the U-18 side.

After the dismissal of Daisuke Sudo by the club, Gainare offered Takagi the top team coaching spot, which he accepted for the 2019 season. His work was notable, since he won the "Manager of the Month" Award twice in his rookie season (in July and October 2019).

He was dismissed from the head coach of Gainare Tottori on May 4, 2021

On 27 November 2022, Takagi appointed of manager J3 club, FC Imabari from 2023 replace Kazuaki Hashikawa left the club after end of 2022 season.

== Managerial statistics ==
As of appointment manager of FC Imabari 27/11/2022.

Team	From	To	Record				
Team	From	To	G	W	D	L	Win %
Gainare Tottori	1 February 2019	4 May 2021	75	33	15	27	44.00
FC Imabari	27 November 2022	15 August 2023	21	8	9	4	38.10
Nagano Parceiro	30 August 2023	"Present"	0	0	0	0	—
Total			96	41	24	31	42.71
