= Marcus Índio =

Brazilian footballer

Personal information
- Full name: Marcus Vinicius Ferreira Teixeira
- Date of birth: 24 January 1998 (age 28)
- Place of birth: Rio de Janeiro, Brazil
- Height: 1.76 m (5 ft 9 in)
- Position: Forward

Team information
- Current team: Nagoya Grampus
- Number: 25

Youth career
- 2015–2016: Figueirense

Senior career*
Years	Team	Apps	(Gls)
2016–2018	Figueirense	29	(2)
2017–2018	→ Atlético Tubarão (loan)	16	(3)
2019–2020	Cabofriense	17	(1)
2019	→ Volta Redonda (loan)	11	(1)
2020–2022	Penapolense	3	(1)
2020	→ Camboriú (loan)	5	(5)
2020	→ Brusque (loan)	7	(0)
2021	→ Criciúma (loan)	11	(0)
2021	→ Camboriú (loan)	18	(11)
2022	→ Retrô (loan)	0	(0)
2022–2025	FC Imabari	136	(53)
2026–	Nagoya Grampus	7	(0)
- * Club domestic league appearances and goals as of 12 August 2026

Marcus Vinicius Ferreira Teixeira (born 24 January 1998), better known as Marcus Índio, is a Brazilian professional footballer who plays as a forward for J1 League club Nagoya Grampus.

== Career ==
Having started his career at Figueirense FC, Marcus Índio spent most of his career with teams in Santa Catarina and Rio de Janeiro. In 2022, he was signed by FC Imabari in Japan, where he remains to this day and has made over 130 appearances.

== Honours ==
Atlético Tubarão

- Copa Santa Catarina: 2017

Figueirense U20

- Campeonato Catarinense Sub-20: 2015

Individual

- J3 League Best XI: 2023, 2024
- J2 League Best XI: 2025
