= 2026–27 Emperor's Cup =

Tournament details
- Country: Japan
- Dates: 19 August 2026 – 1 January 2027
- Teams: 88

The 2026–27 Emperor's Cup or the JFA 106th Japan Football Championship (Japanese: 天皇杯 JFA 第106回全日本サッカー選手権大会) is the 106th edition of the annually known contested cup. It features 88 teams representing the prefectural football associations, university football federation, J1 League and the J2 League. The winner will qualify for the 2027–28 AFC Champions League Two.

== Calendar ==
The schedule was announced on 10 April 2026.

| Round | Date | Matches | Clubs | New entries this round |
|---|---|---|---|---|
| First round | 19 August 2026 | 24 | 48 (47+1) → 24 | 47 prefectural qualification cup winners; 1 amateur designated team |
| Second round | 26 August 2026 | 32 | 64 (24+20+20) → 32 | 20 2026–27 J1 League clubs; 20 2026–27 J2 League clubs |
| Third round | 23 September 2026; 7 October 2026 | 16 | 32 → 16 | None |
| Round of 16 | 9 December 2026 | 8 | 16 → 8 | None |
| Quarter-finals | 23 December 2026 | 4 | 8 → 4 | None |
| Semi-finals | 27 December 2026 | 2 | 4 → 2 | None |
| Final | 1 January 2027 | 1 | 2 → 1 | None |

== Qualifying rounds ==
Only J1 and J2 League clubs qualify directly for the first round. All the teams from lower divisions (starting from the J3 League) who wants to qualify to the Emperor's Cup (exception being made to the JFA-seeded team), have to undergo a prefectural qualification, with regulations and schedules varying from one association to another. In total, there are 47 prefectural cup qualifications, with the winners of each prefectural cup earning their right to play in the Emperor's Cup, with all of them assigned to start the competition in the first round.

Due to the effects of the 2026 Kumamoto earthquake, the Kumamoto Prefecture representative selection tournament was cancelled and Roasso Kumamoto were selected based on the tournament regulations.

| 19 April Akita Final | North Asia University | 1–3 | Akita University | Akita |
| 11:00 JST | | | | Stadium: Akita Central Park Sports Ground |

| 19 April Shimane Final | Belugarosso Iwami | 4–0 | Forza Hikawa | Masuda |
| 13:00 JST | | | | Stadium: Shimane Football Field |

| 19 April Okayama Final | Okayama University | 0–2 | International Pacific University FC | Okayama |
| 13:00 JST | | | | Stadium: JFE Harenokuni Stadium |

| 19 April Hiroshima Final | Fukuyama City FC | 1–1 (a.e.t.) (3–4 p) | SRC Hiroshima | Hiroshima |
| 13:00 JST | | | | Stadium: Edion Peace Wing Hiroshima |

| 26 April Yamagata Final | Oyama SC | 7–0 | Tohoku University of Community Service and Science | Yamagata |
| 11:00 JST | | | | Stadium: Yamagata Municipal Stadium |

| 26 April Saitama Final | Josai University | 1–3 | Tokyo International University | Saitama |
| 11:30 JST | | | | Stadium: Saitama Stadium 2002 2nd Ground |

| 26 April Aomori Final | ReinMeer Aomori | 4–0 | Hachinohe Gakuin University Soccer Club | Aomori |
| 13:00 JST | | | | Stadium: Kakuhiro Group Atheltics Stadium |

| 9 May Chiba Final | Briobecca Urayasu Ichikawa | 3–1 | FC Grasion Tokatsu | Chiba |
| 13:00 JST | | | | Stadium: Fukuda Denshi Arena |

| 9 May Aichi Final | Maruyasu Okazaki | 1–1 (a.e.t.) (4–2 p) | FC Kariya | Nagoya |
| 13:00 JST | | | | Stadium: CS Asset Minato Soccer Stadium |

| 9 May Kyoto Final | Kyoto Sangyo University | 2–1 | Doshisha University | Kyoto |
| 13:00 JST | | | | Stadium: Sanga Stadium by Kyocera |

| 9 May Tokyo Final | Yokogawa Musashino | 0–1 | Criacao Shinjuku | Kita |
| 14:00 JST | | | | Stadium: Ajinomoto Field Nishigaoka |

| 9 May Hyōgo Final | Basara Hyogo | 2–1 | Kwansei Gakuin University | Sumoto |
| 14:00 JST | | | | Stadium: Goshikidai Sports Park |

| 10 May Saga Final | Brew Saga | 0–1 | Kawasoe Club | Ogi |
| 11:00 JST | | | | Stadium: Black Mont Blanc Football Center |

| 10 May Mie Final | Veertien Mie | 0–1 | Atletico Suzuka | Yokkaichi |
| 12:05 JST | | | | Stadium: Yokkaichi Central Athletics Stadium |

| 10 May Hokkaido Final | BTOP Hokkaido | 0–1 | Sapporo University | Sapporo |
| 13:00 JST | | | | Stadium: Sapporo Soccer Amusement Park |

| 10 May Ibaraki Final | University of Tsukuba | 1–2 | Ryutsu Keizai University | Hitachinaka |
| 13:00 JST | | | | Stadium: Hitachinaka City Stadium |

| 10 May Yamanashi Final | Yamanashi Gakuin University | 1–0 | Yamanashi Gakuin University Pegasus | Fujiyoshida |
| 13:00 JST | | | | Stadium: Fuji Hokuroku Stadium |

| 10 May Niigata Final | Niigata University H&W | 2–2 (a.e.t.) (3–4 p) | Japan Soccer College | Shibata |
| 13:00 JST | | | | Stadium: Green Stadium Shibata |

| 10 May Toyama Final | Toyama Shinjo | 4–0 | N-Style | Toyama |
| 13:00 JST | | | | Stadium: Iwase Sports Park |

| 10 May Fukui Final | Fukui United | 2–1 | Sakai Phoenix | Sakai |
| 13:00 JST | | | | Stadium: Technoport Fukui Stadium |

| 10 May Shizuoka Final | Azul Claro Numazu | 0–0 (a.e.t.) (4–2 p) | Honda FC | Numazu |
| 13:00 JST | | | | Stadium: Ashitaka Park Stadium |

| 10 May Wakayama Final | FC Azul Wakayama | 1–9 | Arterivo Wakayama | Wakayama |
| 13:00 JST | | | | Stadium: Kimiidera Athletic Stadium |

| 10 May Nagasaki Final | Mitsubishi Nagasaki SC | 1–2 | Nagasaki International University | Isahaya |
| 13:00 JST | | | | Stadium: Transcosmos Stadium Nagasaki |

| 10 May Oita Final | Verspah Oita | 3–0 | J-Lease FC | Oita |
| 13:00 JST | | | | Stadium: Crasus Soccer & Rugby Field A Court |

| 10 May Miyazaki Final | Veroskronos Tsuno | 1–0 | FC Nobeoka Agata | Miyazaki |
| 13:00 JST | | | | Stadium: Ikimenomori Sports Park Athletic Field |

| 10 May Miyagi Final | Sendai University | 0–1 (a.e.t.) | Tohoku Gakuin University | Rifu |
| 13:30 JST | | | | Stadium: Miyagi Co-op Megumino Soccer Field |

| 10 May Iwate Final | Iwate Grulla Morioka | 2–0 | FC Ganju Iwate | Morioka |
| 14:00 JST | | | | Stadium: Iwagin Stadium |

| 10 May Tokushima Final | Yellow Monkeys | 0–9 | FC Tokushima | Naruto |
| 14:00 JST | | | | Stadium: Naruto Athletic Stadium |

| 11 May Kagoshima Final | Kagoshima United | 1–0 | NIFS Kanoya | Kagoshima |
| 13:00 JST | | | | Stadium: Shiranami Stadium |

| 25 July Fukushima Final | Fukushima United | 7–0 | Iwaki Koga FC | Fukushima |
| 18:00 JST | | | | Stadium: Toho Minna no Stadium |

| 26 July Tottori Final | Gainare Tottori | 2–0 | Yonago Genki SC | Tottori |
| 18:00 JST | | | | Stadium: Axis Bird Stadium |

| 26 July Kagawa Final | SONIO Takamatsu | 0–4 | Kamatamare Sanuki | Marugame |
| 18:00 JST | | | | Stadium: Shikoku Kasei Meglio Stadium |

| 26 July Kochi Final | Kochi United | 4–0 | KUFC Nankoku | Kochi |
| 19:00 JST | | | | Stadium: GIKEN Stadium |

| 29 July Ishikawa Final | Zweigen Kanazawa | 0–1 | Kanazawa Seiryo University | Kanazawa |
| 19:00 JST | | | | Stadium: Ishikawa Athletics Stadium |

| 1 August Nara Final | Nara Club | 1–0 (a.e.t.) | Ikoma FC Nara | Kashihara |
| 17:05 JST | | | | Stadium: Kaban Kobo Yamamoto Athletic Field Kashihara |

| 1 August Shiga Final | Reilac Shiga | 1–0 (a.e.t.) | Moriyama Samurai 2000 | Yasukawa |
| 17:30 JST | | | | Stadium: Big Lake-B Stadium |

| 1 August Tochigi Final | Tochigi SC | 4–1 | Tochigi City U25 | Utsunomiya |
| 18:00 JST | | | | Stadium: Tochigi Green Stadium |

| 1 August Gunma Final | Thespa Gunma | 2–0 | Tonan Maebashi | Maebashi |
| 18:00 JST | | | | Stadium: Shoda Shoyu Stadium Gunma |

| 1 August Kanagawa Final | SC Sagamihara | 0–1 | Senshu University | Yokohama |
| 18:00 JST | | | | Stadium: Nippatsu Mitsuzawa Stadium |

| 1 August Gifu Final | FC Gifu | 11–0 | FC Bombonera | Gifu |
| 18:00 JST | | | | Stadium: Gifu Nagaragawa Meadow |

| 1 August Yamaguchi Final | Renofa Yamaguchi | 6–1 | FC Baleine Shimonoseki | Yamaguchi |
| 18:00 JST | | | | Stadium: Ishin Me-Life Stadium |

| 1 August Ehime Final | Ehime FC | 2–0 | Lavenirosso NC | Matsuyama |
| 18:00 JST | | | | Stadium: Ningineer Stadium |

| 1 August Fukuoka Final | Giravanz Kitakyushu | 3–2 | Fukuoka University | Kitakyushu |
| 18:00 JST | | | | Stadium: Mikuni World Stadium Kitakyushu |

| 2 August Okinawa Final | FC Ryukyu | 0–3 | Okinawa SV | Okinawa |
| 11:00 JST | | | | Stadium: Okinawa Athletic Park Stadium |

| 2 August Nagano Final | Nagano Parceiro | 2–0 | Matsumoto Yamaga | Matsumoto |
| 17:03 JST | | | | Stadium: Sunpro Alwin |

| 2 August Osaka Final | FC Osaka | 3–1 | Tiamo Hirakata | Sakai |
| 19:00 JST | | | | Stadium: J-Green Sakai S1 |

== Participating clubs ==
=== J1 League ===
All teams playing in the 2026–27 J1 League joined the competition in the second round.

| Club | Apps. | Prefecture |
|---|---|---|
| Kashima Antlers | 41st | Ibaraki |
| Mito HollyHock | 30th | Ibaraki |
| Urawa Red Diamonds | 60th | Saitama |
| Kashiwa Reysol | 58th | Chiba |
| JEF United Chiba | 61st | Chiba |
| FC Tokyo | 32nd | Tokyo |
| Tokyo Verdy | 51st | Tokyo |
| Machida Zelvia | 14th | Tokyo |
| Kawasaki Frontale | 43rd | Kanagawa |
| Yokohama F. Marinos | 48th | Kanagawa |

| Club | Apps. | Prefecture |
|---|---|---|
| Shimizu S-Pulse | 34th | Shizuoka |
| Nagoya Grampus | 49th | Aichi |
| Kyoto Sanga | 43rd | Kyoto |
| Gamba Osaka | 46th | Osaka |
| Cerezo Osaka | 57th | Osaka |
| Vissel Kobe | 39th | Hyogo |
| Fagiano Okayama | 18th | Okayama |
| Sanfrecce Hiroshima | 74th | Hiroshima |
| Avispa Fukuoka | 34th | Fukuoka |
| V-Varen Nagasaki | 19th | Nagasaki |

=== J2 League ===
All teams playing in the 2026–27 J2 League joined the competition in the second round.

| Club | Apps. | Prefecture |
|---|---|---|
| Yokohama FC | 27th | Kanagawa |
| Shonan Bellmare | 54th | Kanagawa |
| Albirex Niigata | 34th | Niigata |
| Hokkaido Consadole Sapporo | 45th | Hokkaido |
| Vegalta Sendai | 32nd | Miyagi |
| Blaublitz Akita | 33rd | Akita |
| Montedio Yamagata | 34th | Yamagata |
| Iwaki FC | 9th | Fukushima |
| RB Omiya Ardija | 31st | Saitama |
| Ventforet Kofu | 34th | Yamanashi |

| Club | Apps. | Prefecture |
|---|---|---|
| Kataller Toyama | 17th | Toyama |
| Júbilo Iwata | 49th | Shizuoka |
| Fujieda MYFC | 8th | Shizuoka |
| Tokushima Vortis | 38th | Tokushima |
| FC Imabari | 16th | Ehime |
| Sagan Tosu | 34th | Saga |
| Oita Trinita | 30th | Oita |
| Tegevajaro Miyazaki | 5th | Miyazaki |
| Tochigi City FC | 15th | Tochigi |
| Vanraure Hachinohe | 13th | Aomori |

=== Amateur designated team ===
University of Tsukuba, having won the 2025 All Japan University Football Championship, was selected by the Japan University Football Association to receive the berth.

| Team | Prefecture | League | Level | Apps. |
|---|---|---|---|---|
| University of Tsukuba | Ibaraki | Kanto University League D1 | UL1 | 36th |

=== Prefectural representatives ===
All the 47 prefectural tournament winners (prefectural representatives) joined in the first round.

| Prefecture | Team | League | Level | Apps. |
|---|---|---|---|---|
| Hokkaido | Sapporo University | Hokkaido Student Soccer League Div. 1 | UL1 | 26th |
| Aomori | ReinMeer Aomori | JFL | 4 | 5th |
| Iwate | Iwate Grulla Morioka | JFL | 4 | 19th |
| Miyagi | Tohoku Gakuin University | Tohoku University League Div. 1 | UL1 | 8th |
| Akita | Akita University | Tohoku University League Div. 2 | UL2 | 1st |
| Yamagata | Oyama SC | Tohoku Soccer League Div. 1 | 5 | 5th |
| Fukushima | Fukushima United | J3 | 3 | 14th |
| Ibaraki | Ryutsu Keizai University | Kanto University League Div. 2 | UL2 | 12th |
| Tochigi | Tochigi SC | J3 | 3 | 26th |
| Gunma | Thespa Gunma | J3 | 3 | 23rd |
| Saitama | Tokyo International University | Kantō Soccer League Div. 2 | 6 | 4th |
| Chiba | Briobecca Urayasu Ichikawa | JFL | 4 | 8th |
| Tokyo | Criacao Shinjuku | JFL | 4 | 2nd |
| Kanagawa | Senshu University | Kanto University League Div. 2 | UL2 | 3rd |
| Yamanashi | Yamanashi Gakuin University | Kanto University League Div. 3 | UL3 | 1st |
| Nagano | Nagano Parceiro | J3 | 3 | 13th |
| Niigata | Japan Soccer College | Hokushinetsu Football League Div. 1 | 5 | 15th |
| Toyama | Toyama Shinjo | Hokushinetsu Football League Div. 1 | 5 | 9th |
| Ishikawa | Kanazawa Seiryo University | Hokushin'etsu University League Div. 2 | UL2 | 3rd |
| Fukui | Fukui United | Hokushinetsu Football League Div. 1 | 5 | 18th |
| Shizuoka | Azul Claro Numazu | JFL | 4 | 4th |
| Aichi | Maruyasu Okazaki | JFL | 4 | 6th |
| Mie | Atletico Suzuka | Tōkai Adult Soccer League Div. 1 | 5 | 9th |
| Gifu | FC Gifu | J3 | 3 | 20th |
| Shiga | Reilac Shiga | J3 | 3 | 11th |
| Kyoto | Kyoto Sangyo University | Kansai University League Div. 1 | UL1 | 8th |
| Osaka | FC Osaka | J3 | 3 | 8th |
| Hyogo | Basara Hyogo | Kansai Soccer League Div. 1 | 5 | 2nd |
| Nara | Nara Club | J3 | 3 | 17th |
| Wakayama | Arterivo Wakayama | Kansai Soccer League Div. 1 | 5 | 18th |
| Tottori | Gainare Tottori | J3 | 3 | 28th |
| Shimane | Belugarosso Iwami | Chūgoku Soccer League | 5 | 5th |
| Okayama | International Pacific University FC | Chūgoku University League Div. 1 | UL1 | 4th |
| Hiroshima | SRC Hiroshima | Chūgoku Soccer League | 5 | 8th |
| Yamaguchi | Renofa Yamaguchi | J3 | 3 | 22nd |
| Kagawa | Kamatamare Sanuki | J3 | 3 | 26th |
| Tokushima | FC Tokushima | Shikoku Soccer League | 5 | 11th |
| Ehime | Ehime FC | J3 | 3 | 25th |
| Kochi | Kochi United | J3 | 3 | 11th |
| Fukuoka | Giravanz Kitakyushu | J3 | 3 | 17th |
| Saga | Kawasoe Club | Kyushu Soccer League | 5 | 5th |
| Nagasaki | Nagasaki International University | Kyushu University League Div. 2 | UL2 | 1st |
| Kumamoto | Roasso Kumamoto | J3 | 3 | 26th |
| Oita | Verspah Oita | JFL | 4 | 15th |
| Miyazaki | Veroskronos Tsuno | Kyushu Soccer League | 5 | 3rd |
| Kagoshima | Kagoshima United | J3 | 3 | 12th |
| Okinawa | Okinawa SV | JFL | 4 | 7th |

== Schedule ==
=== First round ===
Number of teams per tier in this round
| J1 League (1) (Note: J1 and J2 League teams joined the competition in the second round.) | J2 League (2) | J3 League (3) | Japan Football League (4) | Regional 1st Divs. (5) | Regional 2nd Divs. (6) | University Leagues (UL) | Total |
|---|---|---|---|---|---|---|---|
| 20 / 20 | 20 / 20 | 16 / 16 | 8 / 8 | 12 / 12 | 1 / 1 | 11 / 11 | 48 / 88 |

| 19 August 2026 Match 1 | Atletico Suzuka (5) | 1–1 (a.e.t.) (3–1 p) | (5) FC Basara Hyogo | Suzuka |
| 18:30 UTC+9 | Watanabe 90+2' (pen.) | Report | Konobu 88' | Stadium: Mie Suzuka Sports Garden; Attendance: 386; Referee: Ryo Munakata |
| | Penalties |
| | Ikematsu (penalty scored); Fukasawa (penalty missed); Shoji (penalty scored); Hineno (penalty scored) | | (penalty scored) Konobu; (penalty missed) Takahashi; (penalty missed) Owaki; (penalty missed) Fukunishi |

| 19 August 2026 Match 2 | Gainare Tottori (3) | 2–2 (a.e.t.) (6–5 p) | (3) Roasso Kumamoto | Tottori |
| 19:00 UTC+9 | Fujita 55'; Shinoda 110' (pen.) | Report | Handai 85'; Katori 94' | Stadium: Axis Bird Stadium; Attendance: 839; Referee: Hirokazu Otsubo |
| | Penalties |
| | Kaneura (penalty scored); Arai (penalty scored); Kawamura (penalty scored); Lorenz (penalty scored); Shinoda (penalty missed); Kiuchi (penalty scored); Katori (penalty scored) | | (penalty scored) Katori; (penalty missed) Onishi; (penalty scored) Nasu; (penalty scored) Mishina; (penalty scored) Ri Thae-ha; (penalty scored) Iihoshi; (penalty missed) Handai |

| 19 August 2026 Match 3 | Tohoku Gakuin University (UL) | 1–3 | (3) Thespa Gunma | Sendai |
| 19:02 UTC+9 | Murakami 75' | Report | Izuma 40', 69'; Nakashima 86' | Stadium: Yurtec Stadium Sendai; Attendance: 903; Referee: Masaaki Hiratsuka |

| 19 August 2026 Match 4 | Tochigi SC (3) | 2–0 | (4) Briobecca Urayasu Ichikawa | Utsunomiya |
| 19:00 UTC+9 | Suzuki 44'; Nakamura 74' | Report | | Stadium: Kanseki Stadium Tochigi; Attendance: 1,719; Referee: Yoshikazu Matsuzawa |

| 19 August 2026 Match 5 | Reilac Shiga (3) | 2–1 | (5) Japan Soccer College | Hikone |
| 19:00 UTC+9 | Hojo 63'; Ide 90+5' | Report | Chikara 81' | Stadium: Heiwado HATO Stadium; Attendance: 651; Referee: Kai Oto |

| 19 August 2026 Match 6 | FC Tokushima (5) | 1–0 | (5) Kawasoe Club | Naruto |
| 18:30 UTC+9 | Tominaga 78' | Report | | Stadium: Naruto Athletic Stadium; Attendance: 256; Referee: Shunki Miyao |

| 19 August 2026 Match 7 | Giravanz Kitakyushu (3) | 1–2 (a.e.t.) | (4) Okinawa SV | Kitakyushu |
| 19:00 UTC+9 | Izawa 50' | Report | Takahashi 40'; Kobori 93' | Stadium: Mikuni World Stadium Kitakyushu; Attendance: 2,177; Referee: Yutaka Hasegawa |

| 19 August 2026 Match 8 | Belugarosso Iwami (5) | 2–0 | (UL) Nagasaki International University | Miyoshi |
| 18:00 UTC+9 | Hasegawa 4', 31' | Report | | Stadium: Miyoshi Athletic Stadium; Attendance: 245; Referee: Ryuta Suzuki |

| 19 August 2026 Match 9 | Arterivo Wakayama (5) | 0–6 | (4) Azul Claro Numazu | Wakayama |
| 17:00 UTC+9 | | Report | Uchida 29'; Taki 38', 48'; Shinozaki 59'; Kawamata 69'; Maie 75' | Stadium: Kimiidera Athletic Stadium; Attendance: 502; Referee: Yusuke Kanabuchi |

| 19 August 2026 Match 10 | Veroskronos Tsuno (5) | 3–1 (a.e.t.) | (3) Kamatamare Sanuki | Shintomi |
| 19:00 UTC+9 | Inoue 35'; Yamada 102'; Takagai 107' | Report | Asada 90+1' | Stadium: Ichigo Miyazaki Shintomi Football Stadium; Attendance: 670; Referee: Shungo Kikuchi |

| 19 August 2026 Match 11 | Verspah Oita (4) | 3–0 | (3) Kochi United | Ōita |
| 19:00 UTC+9 | Takezawa 59'; Kokubu 75'; Nunokata 90+3' | Report | | Stadium: Crasus Dome Oita; Attendance: 824; Referee: Hiroki Murata |

| 19 August 2026 Match 12 | Ryutsu Keizai University (UL) | 1–2 (a.e.t.) | (4) Criacao Shinjuku | Mito |
| 19:00 UTC+9 | Nasu 66' | Report | Sakamoto 86'; Kikutani 116' | Stadium: K's denki Stadium Mito; Attendance: 522; Referee: Shinnosuke Tahara |

| 19 August 2026 Match 13 | Senshu University (UL) | 2–1 | (UL) University of Tsukuba | Hiratsuka |
| 19:00 UTC+9 | Tsukakoshi 85'; Nasu 88' | Report | Ajiki 19' | Stadium: Lemon Gas Stadium Hiratsuka; Attendance: 871; Referee: Yushi Nogiwa |

| 19 August 2026 Match 14 | Fukushima United (3) | 7–0 | (5) Oyama SC | Fukushima |
| 19:00 UTC+9 | Miura 12', 55'; Nozue 32'; Sasaki 45+1'; Chiba 52'; Shimizu 70'; Okada 84' | Report | | Stadium: Toho Stadium; Attendance: 566; Referee: Tatsuya Sakai |

| 19 August 2026 Match 15 | Kanazawa Seiryo University (UL) | 1–4 | (UL) Kyoto Sangyo University | Kanazawa |
| 19:00 UTC+9 | Miyamae 66' | Report | Takagawa 4'; Suetani 15'; Seno 17', 38' | Stadium: Ishikawa Athletics Stadium; Attendance: 748; Referee: Takamasa Funahashi |

| 19 August 2026 Match 16 | Yamanashi Gakuin University (UL) | 1–0 | (6) Tokyo International University | Kōfu |
| 19:00 UTC+9 | Kataoka 39' | Report | | Stadium: JIT Recycle Ink Stadium; Attendance: 518; Referee: Shono Mikawa |

| 19 August 2026 Match 17 | FC Gifu (3) | 3–1 | (5) Toyama Shinjo | Gifu |
| 18:30 UTC+9 | Take 45+2', 74'; Izumisawa 79' | Report | Endo 90+4' | Stadium: Gifu Nagaragawa Stadium; Attendance: 1,273; Referee: Shingo Kuniyoshi |

| 19 August 2026 Match 18 | Kagoshima United (3) | 2–1 | (3) Renofa Yamaguchi | Kagoshima |
| 19:00 UTC+9 | Takahashi 15'; Arita 40' | Report | Watanabe 90+4' | Stadium: Shiranami Stadium; Attendance: 2,807; Referee: Shinya Sasaki |

| 19 August 2026 Match 19 | SRC Hiroshima (5) | 1–6 | (4) Maruyasu Okazaki | Hiroshima |
| 18:30 UTC+9 | Sumihiro 43' | Report | Sakai 20', 61'; Nishimoto 38', 87'; Ogawa 63'; Enomoto 68' | Stadium: Edion Peace Wing Hiroshima; Attendance: 855; Referee: Kokoro Kinoshita |

| 19 August 2026 Match 20 | Nara Club (3) | 1–4 | (3) FC Osaka | Nara |
| 19:00 UTC+9 | Takahata 22' | Report | Tachino 42'; Vinícius Souza 55', 68'; Nagano 75' | Stadium: Rohto Field Nara; Attendance: 829; Referee: Shuhei Ishimaru |

| 19 August 2026 Match 21 | Ehime FC (3) | 2–1 | (UL) International Pacific University | Matsuyama |
| 19:00 UTC+9 | Kabayama 64', 69' | Report | Kasahara 49' | Stadium: Ningineer Stadium; Attendance: 1,037; Referee: Kohei Yano |

| 19 August 2026 Match 22 | Iwate Grulla Morioka (4) | 1–0 | (UL) Sapporo University | Morioka |
| 18:30 UTC+9 | Ishida 90+4' | Report | | Stadium: Iwagin Stadium; Attendance: 687; Referee: Mutsuki Takahashi |

| 19 August 2026 Match 23 | Nagano Parceiro (3) | 2–1 | (5) Fukui United | Matsumoto |
| 19:00 UTC+9 | Gyotoku 85'; Yoshida 89' | Report | Wakatsuki 26' | Stadium: Sunpro Alwin; Attendance: 829; Referee: Ryu Mashio |

| 19 August 2026 Match 24 | ReinMeer Aomori (4) | 15–0 | (UL) Akita University | Aomori |
| 18:00 UTC+9 | Tagashira 3'; Matsumoto 8', 19', 87'; Endo 14'; Imamura 26', 34', 40', 48', 71'; Kodama 41', 47', 54'; Imai 62'; Hirao 90+2' | Report | | Stadium: New Aomori Prefecture General Sports Park; Attendance: 532; Referee: Nobukiyo Matsuda |

=== Second round ===
Number of teams per tier in this round
| J1 League (1) | J2 League (2) | J3 League (3) | Japan Football League (4) | Regional 1st Divs. (5) | University Leagues (UL) | Total |
|---|---|---|---|---|---|---|
| 20 / 20 | 20 / 20 | 10 / 16 | 7 / 8 | 4 / 12 | 3 / 11 | 64 / 88 |

| 26 August 2026 Match 25 | Kashima Antlers (1) | 3–0 | (5) Atletico Suzuka | Ibaraki |
| 19:00 UTC+9 | Chida 47'; Čavrić 75'; Léo Ceará 90' | Report | | Stadium: Mercari Stadium; Attendance: 7,229; Referee: Yusuke Ohashi |

| 26 August 2026 Match 26 | Hokkaido Consadole Sapporo (2) | 1–3 | (2) Ventforet Kofu | Sapporo |
| 19:00 UTC+9 | Takao 30' | Report | Staccioli 59', 70'; Naito 81' | Stadium: Daiwa House Premist Dome; Attendance: 4,377; Referee: Hirokazu Otsubo |

| 26 August 2026 Match 27 | Nagoya Grampus (1) | 1–3 | (3) Gainare Tottori | Toyota |
| 18:30 UTC+9 | Fujii 28' | Report | Shinoda 80', 86'; Kawamura 89' | Stadium: Toyota Stadium; Attendance: 4,366; Referee: Jumpei Iida |

| 26 August 2026 Match 28 | Tokyo Verdy (1) | 4–1 | (3) Thespa Gunma | Kita |
| 18:30 UTC+9 | Kanda 24'; Shirai 70'; Kumatoriya 89'; Kawamura 90' | Report | Izuma 65' | Stadium: Ajinomoto Field Nishigaoka; Attendance: 2,569; Referee: Futoshi Nakamura |

| 26 August 2026 Match 29 | Kawasaki Frontale (1) | 3–1 | (3) Tochigi SC | Kawasaki |
| 19:00 UTC+9 | Ozeki 45', 56'; Konno 50' | Report | Otabor 29' | Stadium: Uvance Todoroki Stadium by Fujitsu; Attendance: 7,596; Referee: Yoshito Nakagawa |

| 26 August 2026 Match 30 | Júbilo Iwata (2) | 0–1 (a.e.t.) | (2) Tegevajaro Miyazaki | Iwata |
| 19:00 UTC+9 | | Report | Toshida 110' | Stadium: Yamaha Stadium; Attendance: 3,846; Referee: Fumiya Honda |

| 26 August 2026 Match 31 | Gamba Osaka (1) | 2–0 | (3) Reilac Shiga | Osaka |
| 19:04 UTC+9 | Usami 2', 17' | Report | | Stadium: Panasonic Stadium Suita; Attendance: 6,873; Referee: Daichi Shiino |

| 26 August 2026 Match 32 | Tokushima Vortis (2) | 3–0 | (5) FC Tokushima | Naruto |
| 18:30 UTC+9 | Inami 29'; Thonny Anderson 58'; Watari 78' | Report | | Stadium: Pocari Sweat Stadium; Attendance: 2,163; Referee: Tetsuro Yoshida |

| 26 August 2026 Match 33 | Sanfrecce Hiroshima (1) | 4–1 | (4) Okinawa SV | Fukuyama |
| 18:30 UTC+9 | Matsumoto 14'; Kato 41', 50'; Ayukawa 79' | Report | Matsumoto 12' (o.g.) | Stadium: Fukuyama Tsuun Rose Stadium; Attendance: 4,778; Referee: Hayato Shimizu |

| 26 August 2026 Match 34 | Iwaki FC (2) | 2–0 (a.e.t.) | (2) Oita Trinita | Iwaki |
| 19:00 UTC+9 | Tanaka 101'; Nakajima 104' | Report | | Stadium: Hawaiians Stadium Iwaki; Attendance: 1,702; Referee: Michiaki Kitazawa |

| 26 August 2026 Match 35 | Fagiano Okayama (1) | 3–0 | (5) Belugarosso Iwami | Okayama |
| 19:00 UTC+9 | Tagami 18'; Kawano 61', 72' | Report | | Stadium: JFE Harenokuni Stadium; Attendance: 3,183; Referee: Koei Koya |

| 26 August 2026 Match 36 | JEF United Chiba (1) | 1–1 (a.e.t.) (8–7 p) | (4) Azul Claro Numazu | Chiba |
| 19:00 UTC+9 | Kawano 120+1' | Report | Wendel 117' | Stadium: Fukuda Denshi Arena; Attendance: 3,690; Referee: Takuya Kobayashi |
| | Penalties |
| | Shinada (penalty scored); Matsumura (penalty missed); Ishio (penalty scored); Rocha (penalty scored); Sugiyama (penalty scored); Kono (penalty scored); Yasui (penalty scored); Issaka (penalty scored); Kubotani (penalty scored) | | (penalty scored) Sugai; (penalty scored) Tokunaga; (penalty scored) Watari; (penalty missed) Hinata; (penalty scored) Mineta; (penalty scored) Shuma; (penalty scored) Wendel; (penalty scored) Inoue; (penalty missed) Okubo |

| 26 August 2026 Match 37 | Vissel Kobe (1) | 2–1 | (5) Veroskronos Tsuno | Kobe |
| 19:03 UTC+9 | Komatsu 38', 74' | Report | Hamada 52' | Stadium: Noevir Stadium Kobe; Attendance: 3,886; Referee: Yuzo Sutani |

| 26 August 2026 Match 38 | Sagan Tosu (2) | 4–0 | (2) Kataller Toyama | Tosu |
| 19:00 UTC+9 | Kamiyama 45+2'; Takahashi 57', 67'; Yoshida 78' | Report | | Stadium: Ekimae Real Estate Stadium; Attendance: 2,600; Referee: Shinya Sasaki |

| 26 August 2026 Match 39 | Avispa Fukuoka (1) | 0–0 (a.e.t.) (5–4 p) | (4) Verspah Oita | Fukuoka |
| 20:05 UTC+9 | | Report | | Stadium: Best Denki Stadium; Attendance: 3,143; Referee: Koichiro Fukushima |
| | Penalties |
| | Hashimoto (penalty scored); Nago (penalty scored); Okuno (penalty scored); Usui (penalty missed); Oka (penalty scored); Maejima (penalty scored) | | (penalty scored) Uryu; (penalty missed) Takazawa; (penalty scored) Nishimura; (penalty scored) Yamasaki; (penalty scored) Kokubu; (penalty scored) Kawanaka |

| 26 August 2026 Match 40 | Yokohama FC (2) | 3–1 | (4) Criacao Shinjuku | Yokohama |
| 18:30 UTC+9 | João Paulo 23'; Kubota 30'; Ogura 66' | Report | Maezawa 37' | Stadium: Mitsuzawa Stadium; Attendance: 1,498; Referee: Shu Kawamata |

| 26 August 2026 Match 41 | Kashiwa Reysol (1) | 2–1 | (UL) Senshu University | Kashiwa |
| 19:00 UTC+9 | Segawa 33'; Chonan 45+1' | Report | Okada 52' | Stadium: Sankyo Frontier Kashiwa Stadium; Attendance: 5,512; Referee: Koki Nagamine |

| 26 August 2026 Match 42 | FC Imabari (2) | 4–1 | (2) Blaublitz Akita | Imabari |
| 19:00 UTC+9 | Mochii 9'; Furuyama 33'; Wesley Tanque 87'; Mori 90+3' | Report | Iizumi 83' | Stadium: ASICS Satoyama Stadium; Attendance: 1,731; Referee: Shuhei Ishimaru |

| 26 August 2026 Match 43 | Yokohama F. Marinos (1) | 1–0 | (3) Fukushima United | Yokohama |
| 19:06 UTC+9 | Suwama 35' | Report | | Stadium: Nissan Stadium; Attendance: 7,327; Referee: Fu Ming |

| 26 August 2026 Match 44 | Mito HollyHock (1) | 0–2 | (UL) Kyoto Sangyo University | Mito |
| 19:00 UTC+9 | | Report | Seno 11', 61' | Stadium: K's denki Stadium Mito; Attendance: 1,409; Referee: Hiroyuki Kimura |

| 26 August 2026 Match 45 | Urawa Red Diamonds (1) | 3–0 | (UL) Yamanashi Gakuin University | Saitama |
| 19:00 UTC+9 | Onaiwu 18', 23'; Katayama 84' | Report | | Stadium: Urawa Komaba Stadium; Attendance: 5,794; Referee: Takafumi Mikuriya |

| 26 August 2026 Match 46 | RB Omiya Ardija (2) | 2–0 | (2) Vanraure Hachinohe | Saitama |
| 19:00 UTC+9 | Sugimoto 22'; Suphanat 59' | Report | | Stadium: NACK5 Stadium Omiya; Attendance: 4,411; Referee: Naoto Uehara |

| 26 August 2026 Match 47 | Cerezo Osaka (1) | 3–1 | (3) FC Gifu | Osaka |
| 18:30 UTC+9 | Lucas Fernandes 21'; Komi 54', 90+6' | Report | Tell 28' | Stadium: Yodoko Sakura Stadium; Attendance: 3,797; Referee: Akihiko Ikeuchi |

| 26 August 2026 Match 48 | Albirex Niigata (2) | 0–4 | (3) Kagoshima United | Niigata |
| 19:04 UTC+9 | | Report | Take 38'; Toyama 51'; Saga 72'; Endo 90+4' | Stadium: Denka Big Swan Stadium; Attendance: 4,466; Referee: Yuki Tanabe |

| 26 August 2026 Match 49 | Kyoto Sanga (1) | 1–0 | (4) Maruyasu Okazaki | Kyoto |
| 19:02 UTC+9 | Nagasawa 67' | Report | | Stadium: Takebishi Stadium Kyoto; Attendance: 3,335; Referee: Masaya Ueda |

| 26 August 2026 Match 50 | Montedio Yamagata (2) | 3–5 (a.e.t.) | (2) Fujieda MYFC | Tendō |
| 19:00 UTC+9 | Yokoyama 15'; Mori 18'; Yoshio 35' | Report | Kanemoto 7'; Nakagawa 13'; Tsunoda 50'; Kitahara 108'; Nakamura 120+4' | Stadium: ND Soft Stadium; Attendance: 3,606; Referee: Keisuke Nobori |

| 26 August 2026 Match 51 | Shimizu S-Pulse (1) | 2–1 (a.e.t.) | (3) FC Osaka | Shizuoka |
| 19:00 UTC+9 | Oh Se-hun 62'; Matsuzaki 93' | Report | Sugawara 17' | Stadium: IAI Stadium Nihondaira; Attendance: 2,981; Referee: Atsushi Kamimura |

| 26 August 2026 Match 52 | V-Varen Nagasaki (1) | 3–2 | (3) Ehime FC | Nagasaki |
| 19:03 UTC+9 | Kou 53'; Sekiguchi 60'; Sawada 72' | Report | Kabayama 62'; Onaga 67' (o.g.) | Stadium: Peace Stadium Connected by SoftBank; Attendance: 5,578; Referee: Hiroki Kasahara |

| 26 August 2026 Match 53 | Machida Zelvia (1) | 3–0 | (4) Iwate Grulla Morioka | Machida |
| 18:30 UTC+9 | Matsuo 37'; Yengi 69'; Nakamura 84' | Report | | Stadium: Machida GION Stadium; Attendance: 2,515; Referee: Yusuke Araki |

| 26 August 2026 Match 54 | Vegalta Sendai (2) | 1–2 | (2) Tochigi City | Sendai |
| 19:00 UTC+9 | Miyazaki 19' | Report | Oshima 45+2'; Yamashita 70' | Stadium: Yurtec Stadium Sendai; Attendance: 4,428; Referee: Reo Tanaka |

| 26 August 2026 Match 55 | FC Tokyo (1) | 6–0 | (3) Nagano Parceiro | Tokyo |
| 19:00 UTC+9 | Yamada 9', 58'; Morishige 15'; Anzai 45+4', 67'; Homma 84' | Report | | Stadium: Ajinomoto Stadium; Attendance: 6,080; Referee: Takahito Seta |

| 26 August 2026 Match 56 | Shonan Bellmare (2) | 1–0 | (4) ReinMeer Aomori | Hiratsuka |
| 19:00 UTC+9 | Matsumura 66' | Report | | Stadium: Lemon Gas Stadium Hiratsuka; Attendance: 2,119; Referee: Yoshikazu Matsuzawa |

=== Third round ===
Number of teams per tier in this round
| J1 League (1) | J2 League (2) | J3 League (3) | University Leagues (UL) | Total |
|---|---|---|---|---|
| 18 / 20 | 11 / 20 | 2 / 16 | 1 / 11 | 32 / 88 |

| 23 September 2026 Match 57 | Kashima Antlers (1) | 3–1 | (2) Ventforet Kofu | Ibaraki |
| 17:01 UTC+9 | Léo Ceará 34'; Yoshida 54'; Omori 62' | Report | Murakami 88' | Stadium: Mercari Stadium; Attendance: 11,498; Referee: Koei Koya |

| 7 October 2026 Match 58 | Gainare Tottori (3) | 0–0 (a.e.t.) (3–4 p) | (1) Tokyo Verdy | Tokyo |
| 19:03 UTC+9 | | Report | | Stadium: Ajinomoto Stadium; Attendance: 2,887; Referee: Takuya Kobayashi |
| | Penalties |
| | Hombo (penalty missed); Arai (penalty missed); Tasei (penalty scored); Nikaido (penalty scored); Hashimoto (penalty scored) | | (penalty scored) Someno; (penalty scored) Kanda; (penalty missed) Fukuda; (penalty scored) Yamamoto; (penalty scored) Meshino |

| 7 October 2026 Match 59 | Kawasaki Frontale (1) | 2–0 | (2) Tegevajaro Miyazaki | Shintomi |
| 19:00 UTC+9 | Marcinho 12'; Miura 50' | Report | | Stadium: Ichigo Miyazaki Shintomi Football Stadium; Attendance: 3,356; Referee: Koji Takasaki |

| 23 September 2026 Match 60 | Gamba Osaka (1) | 5–0 | (2) Tokushima Vortis | Osaka |
| 17:05 UTC+9 | Usami 19'; Yamashita 57'; Hümmet 64'; Ikegaya 86'; Meshino 89' | Report | | Stadium: Panasonic Stadium Suita; Attendance: 9,016; Referee: Yoshimi Yamashita |

| 7 October 2026 Match 61 | Sanfrecce Hiroshima (1) | 4–0 | (2) Iwaki FC | Iwaki |
| 18:30 UTC+9 | Ayukawa 9'; Suzuki 22', 48'; Kobayashi 68' | Report | | Stadium: Hawaiians Stadium Iwaki; Attendance: 2,156; Referee: Yuzo Sutani |

| 7 October 2026 Match 62 | Fagiano Okayama (1) | 1–0 | (1) JEF United Chiba | Chiba |
| 19:04 UTC+9 | Matsumoto 64' | Report | | Stadium: Fukuda Denshi Arena; Attendance: 3,417; Referee: Yoshito Nakagawa |

| 23 September 2026 Match 63 | Vissel Kobe (1) | 1–0 | (2) Sagan Tosu | Kobe |
| 17:04 UTC+9 | Erik 78' | Report | | Stadium: Noevir Stadium Kobe; Attendance: 6,887; Referee: Atsushi Kamimura |

| 7 October 2026 Match 64 | Avispa Fukuoka (1) | 0–1 | (2) Yokohama FC | Yokohama |
| 18:30 UTC+9 | | Report | Komazawa 22' | Stadium: Mitsuzawa Stadium; Attendance: 2,009; Referee: Atsushi Kamimura |

| 23 September 2026 Match 65 | Kashiwa Reysol (1) | 4–0 | (2) FC Imabari | Kashiwa |
| 17:03 UTC+9 | Hosoya 37', 53'; Kubo 44'; Toshima 85' | Report | | Stadium: Sankyo Frontier Kashiwa Stadium; Attendance: 7,068; Referee: Futoshi Nakamura |

| 7 October 2026 Match 66 | Yokohama F. Marinos (1) | 2–1 | (UL) Kyoto Sangyo University | Yokohama |
| 19:05 UTC+9 | Croux 61'; Amano 68' | Report | Fukunaga 35' | Stadium: Nissan Stadium; Attendance: 5,107; Referee: Takahito Seta |

| 7 October 2026 Match 67 | Urawa Red Diamonds (1) | 3–2 | (2) RB Omiya Ardija | Saitama |
| 18:03 UTC+9 | Sasa 60'; Hidano 63'; Onaiwu 79' | Report | Kobayashi 64'; Izumi 82' | Stadium: NACK5 Stadium Omiya; Attendance: 11,956; Referee: Ryo Tanimoto |

| 7 October 2026 Match 68 | Cerezo Osaka (1) | 2–0 | (3) Kagoshima United | Osaka |
| 18:34 UTC+9 | Lucas Fernandes 25'; Sakata 80' | Report | | Stadium: Yodoko Sakura Stadium; Attendance: 3,900; Referee: Keigo Sendachi |

| 23 September 2026 Match 69 | Kyoto Sanga (1) | 1–0 | (2) Fujieda MYFC | Kameoka |
| 17:04 UTC+9 | Everton Maceió 88' | Report | | Stadium: Sanga Stadium by Kyocera; Attendance: 6,359; Referee: Takafumi Mikuriya |

| 7 October 2026 Match 70 | Shimizu S-Pulse (1) | 2–1 (a.e.t.) | (1) V-Varen Nagasaki | Shizuoka |
| 19:00 UTC+9 | Kitagawa 13'; Yumiba 116' | Report | Thiago Santana 39' | Stadium: IAI Stadium Nihondaira; Attendance: 3,534; Referee: Hayato Shimizu |

| 23 September 2026 Match 71 | Machida Zelvia (1) | 2–1 | (2) Tochigi City | Machida |
| 17:05 UTC+9 | Duke 22'; Ogawa 70' | Report | Koike 69' | Stadium: Machida GION Stadium; Attendance: 3,003; Referee: Masuya Ueda |

| 7 October 2026 Match 72 | FC Tokyo (1) | 4–0 | (2) Shonan Bellmare | Hiratsuka |
| 19:03 UTC+9 | Yamada 14'; Gómez 34'; Anzai 72'; Teruhito Nakagawa 77' | Report | | Stadium: Lemon Gas Stadium Hiratsuka; Attendance: 4,311; Referee: Yusuke Araki |

=== Round of 16 ===
The Round of 16 draw took place on October 15 2026.

Number of teams per tier in this round
| J1 League (1) | J2 League (2) | Total |
|---|---|---|
| 15 / 20 | 1 / 20 | 16 / 88 |

| 9 December 2026 Match 73 | Vissel Kobe (1) | v | (1) Shimizu S-Pulse |
| --:-- UTC+9 |

| 9 December 2026 Match 74 | Kashima Antlers (1) | v | (1) Cerezo Osaka |
| --:-- UTC+9 |

| 9 December 2026 Match 75 | Yokohama FC (2) | v | (1) FC Tokyo |
| --:-- UTC+9 |

| 9 December 2026 Match 76 | Kawasaki Frontale (1) | v | (1) Yokohama F.Marinos |
| --:-- UTC+9 |

| 9 December 2026 Match 77 | Machida Zelvia (1) | v | (1) Tokyo Verdy |
| --:-- UTC+9 |

| 9 December 2026 Match 78 | Kashiwa Reysol (1) | v | (1) Fagiano Okayama |
| --:-- UTC+9 |

| 9 December 2026 Match 79 | Kyoto Sanga (1) | v | (1) Sanfrecce Hiroshima |
| --:-- UTC+9 |

| 9 December 2026 Match 80 | Gamba Osaka (1) | v | (1) Urawa Red Diamonds |
| --:-- UTC+9 |
