= Kurashiki Ablaze =

Japanese Professional women's volleyball team

- 2024 PVL Invitational Conference
- Crest
- Founded: 2019
- Manager: Hideo Suzuki
- Captain: Saya Taniguchi
- League: V.League
- 2024–25: TBD
- Website: Club home page
- Championships: Premier Volleyball League: 1 (2023 Invitational)

Uniforms
Home	Away

The Kurashiki Ablaze (倉敷アブレイズ, Kurashiki Abureizu) is a Japanese professional women's volleyball team from Kurashiki, Okayama which plays in the V.League, the second-tier volleyball league in Japan.

== History ==
It is a volleyball club from Kurashiki City, Okayama, Japan founded in 2019. Kurashiki Ablaze is operated by Ablaze Co., Ltd. that is located in Minamiune, Kurashiki, Okayama.

Kurashiki won bronze medal in 13th National 6-Person Final League & Grand Champion Match Awards in Japan.

They debuted at the V.League for the 2023–24 season after being given an S3 license in October 2022.

They would join the Premier Volleyball League in the Philippines as one of the two foreign guest teams for the 2023 Invitational Conference. They also beat the undefeated 6 year semi finals no loss place of Creamline Cool Smashers. Kurashiki won their first title in the PVL against the Creamline Cool Smashers in five-set match. After the awards ceremony, Kurashiki helped to clean the PhilSports Arena that caught the attention of the Creamline Cool Smashers team manager Alan Acero. They would return in 2024 to defend their PVL Invitation Conference crown. They however would finish third place.

They are also set to play in the 2024–25 season of the V.League, which saw its division two and three merged.

== Team image ==
The meaning of ABLAZE to the team refers to "passion", "excitement", and "burning".

== Current roster ==
These are the players for the 2024 Premier Volleyball League Invitational Conference.

Kurashiki Ablaze
No.	Player	Position	Height	Birth date	School
1	(Japan) Wako Omura	Setter	1.61 m (5 ft 3 in)	15 June 2001 (age 24)	Okayama Minami High School
2	(Japan) Saya Taniguchi (C)	Opposite Hitter	1.73 m (5 ft 8 in)	12 August 2000 (age 25)	Kyoto Tachibana University
3	(Japan) Kyoka Ohshima	Setter	1.75 m (5 ft 9 in)	2 February 1998 (age 28)	Tokyo Women's College of Physical Education
4	(Japan) Sayaka Tanida	Outside Hitter	1.66 m (5 ft 5 in)	31 October 2000 (age 25)	Seishin Girl's High School
7	(Japan) Ayane Wanatabe	Libero	1.52 m (5 ft 0 in)	3 November 2002 (age 23)	Seiei High School
9	(Japan) Kaoru Takahashi	Libero	1.67 m (5 ft 6 in)	26 May 1998 (age 28)	Chūgoku Gakuen University
10	(Japan) Yukino Yano	Outside Hitter	1.65 m (5 ft 5 in)	1 March 2000 (age 26)	Nagasaki International University
12	(Japan) Asaka Tamaru	Opposite Hitter	1.70 m (5 ft 7 in)	4 August 1998 (age 27)	Kyoto Sangyo University
13	(Japan) Miho Kawamura	Middle Blocker	1.75 m (5 ft 9 in)	13 September 1999 (age 26)	Osaka University of Health and Sport Sciences
14	(Japan) Reina Fujiwara	Opposite Hitter	1.70 m (5 ft 7 in)	25 October 1997 (age 28)	International Pacific University
15	(Malaysia) Low Mei Cing	Middle Blocker	1.84 m (6 ft 0 in)	17 January 1996 (age 30)	National Taiwan Normal University
16	(Japan) Saki Tanabe	Opposite Hitter	1.69 m (5 ft 7 in)	30 March 1999 (age 27)	National Institute of Fitness and Sports in Kanoya
17	(Japan) Kokoro Takio	Opposite Hitte	1.73 m (5 ft 8 in)	19 November 2001 (age 24)	Mukogawa Women's University
18	(Japan) Nana Fujimura	Libero	1.57 m (5 ft 2 in)	14 December 2004 (age 21)	Okayama Minami High School
22	(Japan) Honoka Doi	Opposite Hitter	1.73 m (5 ft 8 in)	15 May 2005 (age 21)	Seiei High School
23	(Japan) Mami Gondo	Middle Blocker	1.65 m (5 ft 5 in)	15 June 2001 (age 24)	Osaka University of Health and Sport Sciences

Coaching staff

- Head coach: Hideo Suzuki
- Assistant coach: Tamaru Shoichiro

== Previous roster ==
2023–24
Main article: 2023 Premier Volleyball League Invitational Conference
These are the players for 2023/2024:

Kurashiki Ablaze
No.	Player	Position	Height	Birth date	School
1	(Japan) Wako Omura	Setter	1.61 m (5 ft 3 in)	15 June 2001 (age 24)	Okayama Minami High School
2	(Japan) Saya Taniguchi	Opposite Hitter	1.73 m (5 ft 8 in)	12 August 2000 (age 25)	Kyoto Tachibana University
3	(Japan) Kyoka Ohshima(C)	Setter	1.75 m (5 ft 9 in)	2 February 1998 (age 28)	Tokyo Women's College of Physical Education
4	(Japan) Sayaka Tanida	Outside Hitter	1.66 m (5 ft 5 in)	31 October 2000 (age 25)	Seishin Girl's High School
5	(Japan) Momoka Yashimiro	Libero	1.58 m (5 ft 2 in)	20 September 1998 (age 27)	Chūgoku Gakuen University
7	(Japan) Ayane Wanatabe	Libero	1.52 m (5 ft 0 in)	3 November 2002 (age 23)	Seiei High School
9	(Japan) Kaoru Takahashi	Libero	1.67 m (5 ft 6 in)	26 May 1998 (age 28)	Chūgoku Gakuen University
10	(Japan) Yukino Yano	Outside Hitter	1.65 m (5 ft 5 in)	1 March 2000 (age 26)	Nagasaki International University
11	(Japan) Akane Hiraoka	Middle Blocker	1.70 m (5 ft 7 in)	4 November 1999 (age 26)	Fukuyama Heisei University
12	(Japan) Asaka Tamaru	Opposite Hitter	1.70 m (5 ft 7 in)	4 August 1998 (age 27)	Kyoto Sangyo University
13	(Japan) Miho Kawamura	Middle Blocker	1.75 m (5 ft 9 in)	13 September 1999 (age 26)	Osaka University of Health and Sport Sciences
16	(Japan) Saki Tanabe	Opposite Hitter	1.69 m (5 ft 7 in)	30 March 1999 (age 27)	National Institute of Fitness and Sports in Kanoya
17	(Japan) Mihaya Hata	Middle Blocker	1.73 m (5 ft 8 in)	11 September 2002 (age 23)	Eimei High School
18	(Japan) Reina Fujiwara	Opposite Hitter	1.70 m (5 ft 7 in)	25 October 1997 (age 28)	International Pacific University
20	(Japan) Nana Fujimura	Libero	1.57 m (5 ft 2 in)	14 December 2004 (age 21)	Okayama Minami High School
23	(Japan) Honoka Okuda	Libero	1.61 m (5 ft 3 in)	19 July 2003 (age 22)	Okayama Minami High School

Coaching staff

- Head coach:
  Hideo Suzuki
- Assistant coach:
  Shota Sato

2022–23

Kurashiki Ablaze
No.	Player	Position	Height	Birth date	School
1	(Japan) Wako Omura	Setter	1.61 m (5 ft 3 in)	15 June 2001 (age 24)	Okayama Minami High School
2	(Japan) Saya Taniguchi	Opposite Hitter	1.73 m (5 ft 8 in)	12 August 2000 (age 25)	Kyoto Tachibana University
3	(Japan) Kyoka Ohshima(C)	Setter	1.75 m (5 ft 9 in)	2 February 1998 (age 28)	Tokyo Women's College of Physical Education
4	(Japan) Sayaka Tanida	Outside Hitter	1.66 m (5 ft 5 in)	31 October 2000 (age 25)	Seishin Girl's High School
5	(Japan) Momoka Yashimiro	Libero	1.58 m (5 ft 2 in)	20 September 1998 (age 27)	Chūgoku Gakuen University
6	(Japan) Asuka Kuwabura	Libero	1.63 m (5 ft 4 in)	9 October 1999 (age 26)	Nagano Bunka Gakuen High School
7	(Japan) Hikari Niguma	Opposite Hitter	1.66 m (5 ft 5 in)	3 January 1997 (age 29)	N/A
9	(Japan) Kaoru Takahashi	Libero	1.67 m (5 ft 6 in)	26 May 1998 (age 28)	Chūgoku Gakuen University
10	(Japan) Yukino Yano	Middle Blocker	1.65 m (5 ft 5 in)	4 November 1999 (age 26)	Nagasaki International University
11	(Japan) Akane Hiraoka	Outside Hitter	1.70 m (5 ft 7 in)	1 March 2000 (age 26)	Fukuyama Heisei University
13	(Japan) Miho Kawamura	Middle Blocker	1.75 m (5 ft 9 in)	13 September 1999 (age 26)	Osaka University of Health and Sport Sciences
14	(Japan) Sachiyo Takahashi	Middle Blocker	1.73 m (5 ft 8 in)	4 November 1983 (age 42)	N/A
15	(Japan) Asaka Tamaru	Opposite Hitter	1.70 m (5 ft 7 in)	26 May 1998 (age 28)	Kyoto Sangyo University
16	(Japan) Kumiko Matsubara	Libero	1.58 m (5 ft 2 in)	8 May 1987 (age 39)	N/A
17	(Japan) Mihaya Hata	Middle Blocker	1.73 m (5 ft 8 in)	11 September 2002 (age 23)	Eimei High School
18	(Japan) Reina Fujiwara	Libero	1.70 m (5 ft 7 in)	25 October 1997 (age 28)	International Pacific University
19	(Japan) Ayane Watanabe	Libero	1.52 m (5 ft 0 in)	3 November 2002 (age 23)	Seiei High School
20	(Japan) Nana Fujimura	Libero	1.57 m (5 ft 2 in)	14 December 2004 (age 21)	Okayama Minami High School
21	(Philippines) Carrie Ann Pronuevo	Outside Hitter	1.73 m (5 ft 8 in)	6 December 1997 (age 28)	Polytechnic University of the Philippines
22	(Philippines) Javen Sabas	Outside Hitter	1.67 m (5 ft 6 in)	31 January 1999 (age 27)	Polytechnic University of the Philippines
23	(Japan) Honoka Okuda	Libero	1.61 m (5 ft 3 in)	19 July 2003 (age 22)	Okayama Minami High School

Coaching staff

- Head coach:
  Hideo Suzuki
- Assistant coach:
  Shota Sato

2021–22

Kurashiki Ablaze
No.	Player	Position	Height	Birth date	School
1	(Japan) Wako Omura	Setter	1.61 m (5 ft 3 in)	15 June 2001 (age 24)	Okayama Minami High School
2	(Japan) Ruka Matsushima	Setter	1.63 m (5 ft 4 in)	17 December 1997 (age 28)	Kobe Shinwa Women's University
3	(Japan) Kyoka Ohshima(C)	Setter	1.75 m (5 ft 9 in)	2 February 1998 (age 28)	Tokyo Women's College of Physical Education
4	(Japan) Sayaka Tanida	Outside Hitter	1.66 m (5 ft 5 in)	31 October 2000 (age 25)	Seishin Girl's High School
5	(Japan) Momoka Yashimiro	Libero	1.58 m (5 ft 2 in)	20 September 1998 (age 27)	Chūgoku Gakuen University
6	(Japan) Asuka Kuwabura	Libero	1.63 m (5 ft 4 in)	9 October 1999 (age 26)	Nagano Bunka Gakuen High School
7	(Japan) Hikari Niguma	Opposite Hitter	1.66 m (5 ft 5 in)	3 January 1997 (age 29)	N/A
9	(Japan) Kaoru Takahashi	Libero	1.67 m (5 ft 6 in)	26 May 1998 (age 28)	Chūgoku Gakuen University
11	(Japan) Akane Hiraoka	Outside Hitter	1.70 m (5 ft 7 in)	1 March 2000 (age 26)	Fukuyama Heisei University
13	(Japan) Miho Kawamura	Middle Blocker	1.75 m (5 ft 9 in)	13 September 1999 (age 26)	Osaka University of Health and Sport Sciences
14	(Japan) Sachiyo Takahashi	Middle Blocker	1.73 m (5 ft 8 in)	4 November 1983 (age 42)	N/A
15	(Japan) Asaka Tamaru	Opposite Hitter	1.70 m (5 ft 7 in)	26 May 1998 (age 28)	Kyoto Sangyo University
16	(Japan) Kumiko Matsubara	Libero	1.58 m (5 ft 2 in)	8 May 1987 (age 39)	N/A
17	(Japan) Mihaya Hata	Middle Blocker	1.73 m (5 ft 8 in)	11 September 2002 (age 23)	Eimei High School
18	(Japan) Reina Fujiwara	Libero	1.70 m (5 ft 7 in)	25 October 1997 (age 28)	International Pacific University
19	(Japan) Ayane Watanabe	Libero	1.52 m (5 ft 0 in)	3 November 2002 (age 23)	Seiei High School
20	(Japan) Rina Okabayashi	Libero	1.48 m (4 ft 10 in)	N/A	N/A
21	(Philippines) Carrie Ann Pronuevo	Outside Hitter	1.73 m (5 ft 8 in)	6 December 1997 (age 28)	Polytechnic University of the Philippines
22	(Philippines) Javen Sabas	Outside Hitter	1.67 m (5 ft 6 in)	31 January 1999 (age 27)	Polytechnic University of the Philippines
23	(Japan) Honoka Okuda	Libero	1.61 m (5 ft 3 in)	19 July 2003 (age 22)	Okayama Minami High School

Coaching staff

- Head coach:
  Hideo Suzuki
- Assistant coach:
  Shota Sato

== Honors ==
=== Team ===
Season	Conference	Title	Source
2023	PVL Invitational Conference	Champions	
2024–25	2024 PVL Invitational Conference	3rd place	
2024–25	V.League (Japan)		

=== Individual ===
Season	Conference	Award	Name	Source
2023	PVL Invitational Conference	Finals MVP	Kyoka Ohshima	
2023	PVL Invitational Conference	1st Best Outside Spiker	Asaka Tamaru	
2024	PVL Invitational Conference	Best Opposite Spiker	Saya Taniguchi	
2024	PVL Invitational Conference	2nd Best Middle Blocker	Low Mei Cing	

== Foreign players ==
- (Philippines) Carrie Ann Pronuevo
- (Philippines) Javen Sabas
- Low Mei Cing – Malaysia national team player
