= 英明 =

英明, meaning 'excellent', 'bright', may refer to:

- Hideaki, a masculine Japanese given name.
- Eimei High School, a senior high school located in Kagawa Prefecture
- Xu Yingming (许英明, born 1992), a Chinese fencer
