= ReinMeer Aomori =

Japanese football club

ReinMeer Aomori ラインメール青森
- Full name: ReinMeer Aomori Football Club
- Nickname: ReinMeer
- Founded: 1995; 31 years ago
- Ground: Kakuhiro Group Athletic Stadium (or Michinoku Bank Dream Stadium); Aomori, Aomori
- Capacity: 20,809
- Chairman: Miki Sakaki
- Manager: Masato Harasaki
- League: Japan Football League
- 2025: 5th of 16
- Website: reinmeer-aomori.jp
Home colours	Away colours

ReinMeer Aomori (ラインメール青森, Rainmēru Aomori) is a Japanese football club based in Aomori, the capital city of Aomori Prefecture. It currently plays in the Japan Football League, Japanese fourth tier of league football. The team colour is blue.

== History ==
Founded in 1995, ReinMeer Aomori was managed by Aomori City Football Association, which picked players from existing clubs. The name was originated by the mix of two German word, "rein" (clean) and "Meer" (sea). The name was picked to symbolize the nature of Aomori. The logo is the main protagonist of the Aomori Nebuta Matsuri festival.

In 2016, the club played for the first time in the Japan Football League and hopes to reach the J1 League by 2030.

In 2025, they won against the Yokohama F Marinos in the second round of the Emperor's Cup by a score of 2-0.

== Stadiums ==
The home stadium that was applied for and registered during the J.League Centennial Concept Club era is the New Aomori Prefecture General Sports Park Athletic Stadium (Kakuhiro Group Athletic Stadium), but now the adjacent sports park ball game field is the main one.

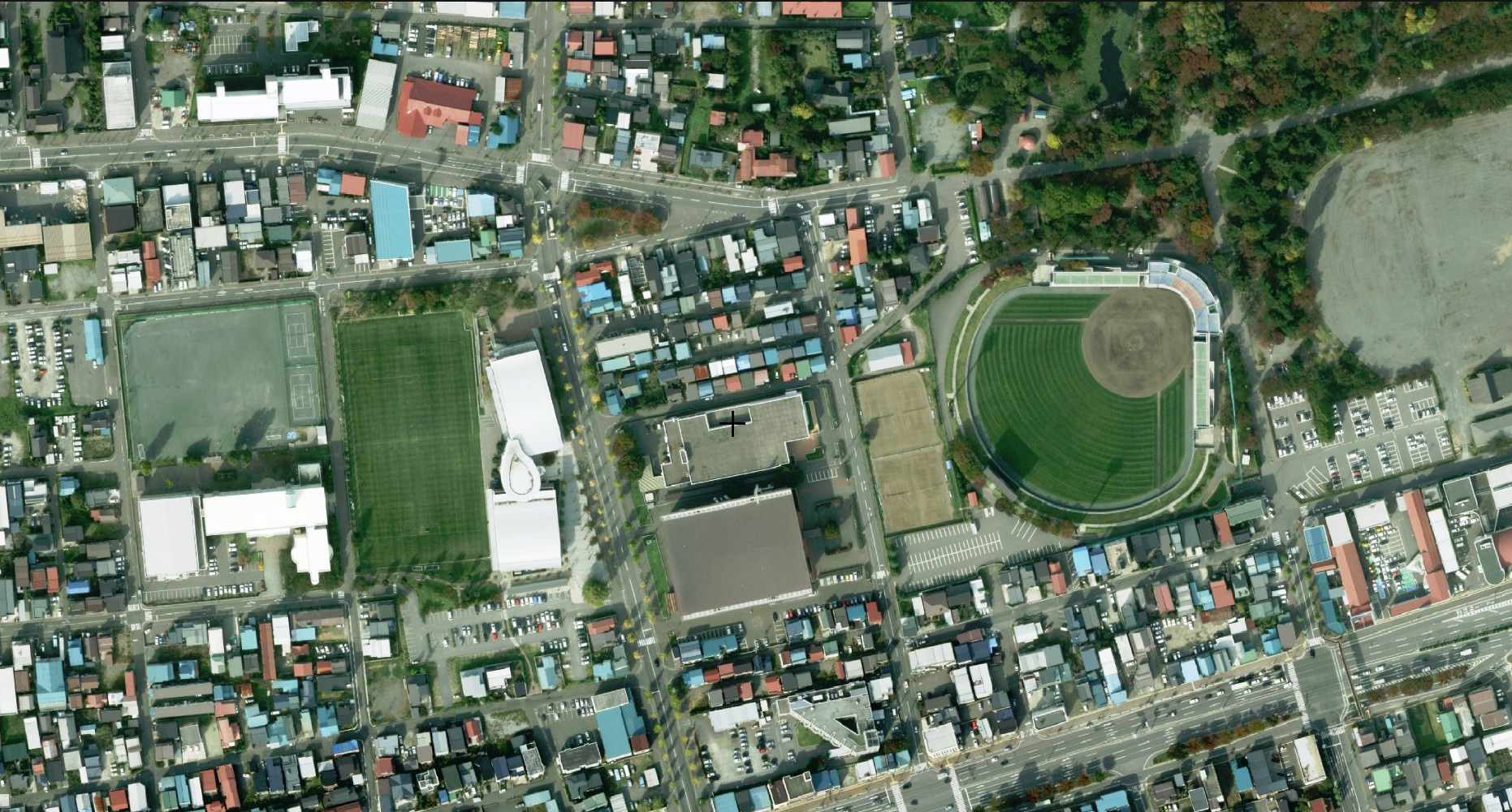
Satellite view of Michinoku Bank Dream Stadium

== League and cup record ==
Champions	Runners-up	Third place	Promoted	Relegated

League													Emperor's Cup	Shakaijin Cup
Season	Division	Tier	Pos.	P	W	D	L	F	A	GD	Pts	Attendance/G	Emperor's Cup	Shakaijin Cup
2008	Aomori Prefecture; 1st Division	6	1st	11	10	1	0	43	5	38	31		Did not qualify	Not eligible
2009	Tohoku Soccer League (Div. 2)	5	7th	14	4	3	7	21	33	-12	15		Did not qualify	Not eligible
2010	Tohoku Soccer League (Div. 2)	5	7th	14	3	1	10	25	48	-23	10		Did not qualify	Not eligible
2011	Tohoku Soccer League (Div. 2)	5	5th	10	5	1	4	28	21	7	16		Did not qualify	Not eligible
2012	Tohoku Soccer League (Div. 2, North)	5	3rd	14	8	2	4	41	32	9	26		Did not qualify	Not eligible
2013	Tohoku Soccer League (Div. 2, North)	5	1st	18	16	2	0	53	3	50	50		Did not qualify	Not eligible
2014	Tohoku Soccer League (Div. 1)	5	3rd	18	13	2	3	56	16	40	41		Did not qualify	2nd round
2015	Tohoku Soccer League (Div. 1)	5	2nd	18	14	4	0	82	11	71	46		1st round	4th place
2016	JFL	4	8th	30	13	6	11	35	33	2	45		Did not qualify	Not eligible
2017	JFL	4	2nd	30	17	10	3	44	28	16	61		Did not qualify	Not eligible
2018	JFL	4	10th	30	10	7	13	38	48	-10	37		2nd round	Not eligible
2019	JFL	4	13th	30	9	9	12	40	44	-4	36		Did not qualify	Not eligible
2020	JFL	4	15th	15	4	4	7	17	26	-9	16		4th round	Not eligible
2021	JFL	4	9th	32	12	9	11	41	49	-8	45		Did not qualify	Not eligible
2022	JFL	4	4th	30	14	9	7	35	23	12	51		Did not qualify	Not eligible
2023	JFL	4	5th	28	11	9	8	30	24	6	42		Did not qualify	Not eligible
2024	JFL	4	10th	30	9	14	7	32	26	6	41		Did not qualify	Not eligible
2025	JFL	4	6th	30	14	7	9	40	34	6	49	2,061	3rd round	Not eligible
2026–27	JFL	4	TBD	30									TBD	Not eligible

Key

- Pos. = Position in league; P = Games played; W = Games won; D = Games drawn; L = Games lost; F = Goals scored; A = Goals conceded; GD = Goals difference; Pts = Points gained
- Source: JFL

== Honours ==
ReinMeer Aomori honours
Honour	No.	Years
Aomori Prefecture	1	2008
Tohoku Soccer League 2nd Division North	1	2013
Aomori Prefectural Football Championship (Emperor's Cup Aomori Prefectural Qualifiers)	4	2015, 2018, 2020, 2025

== Current squad ==
As of 1 October 2026

Note: Flags indicate national team as defined under FIFA eligibility rules; some limited exceptions apply. Players may hold more than one non-FIFA nationality.

No.	Pos.	Nation	Player
2	DF	JPN	Naiki Imai
3	DF	JPN	Genichi Endo
4	DF	JPN	Tsubasa Sato
5	FW	JPN	Teruyuki Takagi
6	MF	JPN	Koudai Asari
7	MF	JPN	Jukiya Fujishima
8	DF	JPN	Riku Hashimoto
9	FW	JPN	Yusuke Imamura
10	FW	JPN	Takumu Fujinuma
11	FW	JPN	Takumi Fujiwara
13	FW	JPN	Koki Arita
14	MF	JPN	Kaito Utaka
15	DF	JPN	Riku Tamura
16	MF	JPN	Atsuki Akashi
17	GK	JPN	Riku Hirosue

No.	Pos.	Nation	Player
18	DF	JPN	Kaito Umezawa
19	MF	JPN	Kazuma Tomikuda
20	MF	JPN	Taiga Hirao
21	GK	KOR	Park Kwang-gyu
22	MF	JPN	Park Yong-ji
23	GK	JPN	Kazumasa Shiga
24	MF	JPN	Kantaro Ishiyama
27	DF	JPN	Shunki Sakuma
29	MF	JPN	Ryota Tagashira
33	MF	JPN	Naoya Senoo
39	MF	JPN	Takumi Koba
40	FW	JPN	Reoto Kodama
41	MF	JPN	Futa Nagashima
50	DF	JPN	Ryusei Akimoto (on loan from Thespa Gunma)
99	FW	JPN	Kohei Matsumoto

== Club officials ==
For the 2025 season

Position	Staff
Manager	(Japan) Masato Harasaki
Head coach	(Japan) Masanori Kurao
coach	(Japan) Atsushi Kubo
Goalkeeper coach	(Japan) Yukio Takeda
Physical Coach	(Japan) Mitsuki Narita
Principal / Interpreter	(Japan) Tsuena Hidenori
Trainer	(Japan) Michitaka Kato

== Managerial history ==
Manager	Nationality	Tenure	
Manager	Nationality	Start	Finish
Masahiro Kuzuno	Japan	1 February 2014	31 January 2018
Tatsuya Mochizuki	Japan	1 February 2018	31 January 2021
Ryō Adachi	Japan	1 February 2021	31 January 2022
Kei Shibata	Japan	1 February 2022	31 January 2025
Masato Harasaki	Japan	1 February 2025	Current
