= 2023 Creamline Cool Smashers season =

Sixth season of the Creamline Cool Smashers

The 2023 Creamline Cool Smashers season was the sixth season of the Creamline Cool Smashers in the Premier Volleyball League (PVL).

== Season summary ==
No changes were made to the base roster heading into the First All-Filipino Conference, but team captain Alyssa Valdez was unavailable due to injury. Jia de Guzman was then named captain for the conference. The Valdez-less Cool Smashers went on to top the conference with a 7–1 record and 22 points. Their only loss came from the F2 Logistics Cargo Movers in a five-set match on February 18. On March 7, the Cool Smashers clinched a spot in the final round with a win against the PLDT High Speed Hitters. F2 Logistics would then become their semifinals opponent, but Creamline were able to get revenge by sweeping the series. In the championship, they would enter a rivalry series against the Petro Gazz Angels. The Angels were able to get ahead in the first match of their fourth championship meeting, but Creamline evened the series after a five-set victory in the second match. They were then able to win the third-match for their sixth PVL title and fourth All-Filipino title. It was also their first title without Valdez.

Ahead of the Invitational Conference, Creamline added Bernadeth Pons, a member of their beach volleyball team, to the indoor squad on June 2. Valdez then returned for the start of the conference against the Chery Tiggo Crossovers. The team then swept Pool A with a 4–0 record and 12 points to advance to the semifinals. Their win streak continued through the first three matches of the semis before they lost to Japan-based Kurashiki Ablaze in the final match. They would end up having to face Kurashiki again for the championship. The match went the full five-set length, but Creamline wasn't able to clinch the title on the final set.

On August 31, de Guzman departed Creamline to join the Denso Airybees of Japan's V.League. On October 13, the team signed collegiate recruits Theo Bea Bonafe and Mafe Galanza ahead of their Second All-Filipino Conference campaign. In the Second All-Filipino Conference, Creamline once again showed their dominant form, winning all eleven games and earning 32 points with their only dropped point coming from their five-set victory over Petro Gazz on November 9. After sweeping the Chery Tiggo Crossovers in the semifinals, the Cool Smashers entered their tenth championship match and sixth consecutive All-Filipino championship, but for the first time, they were matched against sister team Choco Mucho Flying Titans. Creamline were able to sweep their sister team in two matches to win their seventh PVL title and fifth All-Filipino title.

== Roster ==
Creamline Cool Smashers
Number	Player	Position	Height	Birth date	School
1	(Philippines) Kyle Angela Negrito	Setter	1.72 m (5 ft 8 in)	December 15, 1996 (age 29)	Far Eastern University
2	(Philippines) Alyssa Valdez (C)	Outside Hitter	1.74 m (5 ft 9 in)	June 29, 1993 (age 32)	Ateneo de Manila University
5	(Philippines) (Japan) Risa Sato	Middle Blocker	1.76 m (5 ft 9 in)	October 4, 1994 (age 31)	National University
6	(Philippines) Jeanette Panaga	Middle Blocker	1.78 m (5 ft 10 in)	July 25, 1994 (age 31)	College of Saint Benilde
7	(Philippines) Michele Theresa Gumabao	Opposite Hitter	1.75 m (5 ft 9 in)	September 2, 1992 (age 33)	De La Salle University
8	(Philippines) Jorella Marie de Jesus	Libero	1.57 m (5 ft 2 in)	August 17, 1993 (age 32)	Ateneo de Manila University
9	(Philippines) Lorie Lyn Bernardo	Middle Blocker	1.82 m (6 ft 0 in)	August 1, 2000 (age 25)	University of the Philippines
10	(Philippines) Maria Paulina Soriano	Middle blocker	1.70 m (5 ft 7 in)	December 31, 1991 (age 34)	Adamson University
11	(Philippines) Kyla Llana Atienza	Libero	1.67 m (5 ft 6 in)	April 12, 1997 (age 28)	Far Eastern University
15	(Philippines) Theo Bea Bonafe	Setter	1.73 m (5 ft 8 in)		University of the Philippines
16	(Philippines) Rizza Jane Mandapat	Opposite Hitter	1.73 m (5 ft 8 in)	February 28, 1994 (age 31)	National University
17	(Philippines) Rosemarie Vargas	Outside Hitter	1.70 m (5 ft 7 in)	December 12, 1992 (age 33)	Far Eastern University
18	(Philippines) Diana Mae Carlos	Opposite Hitter	1.74 m (5 ft 9 in)	July 7, 1998 (age 27)	University of the Philippines
19	(Philippines) Bernadeth Pons	Outside Hitter	1.70 m (5 ft 7 in)	October 19, 1996 (age 29)	Far Eastern University
20	(Philippines) Maria Fe Galanza	Setter	1.65 m (5 ft 5 in)	May 11, 2000 (age 25)	University of Santo Tomas
23	(Philippines) Jema Galanza	Outside Hitter	1.70 m (5 ft 7 in)	November 28, 1996 (age 29)	Adamson University

Coaching staff

- Head coach:
  Sherwin Meneses
- Assistant coach:
  Karlo Martin Santos

Team staff

- Team manager:
  Ma. Carlota Celda
  Alan Acero
- Trainers:
  Mark Christopher Caron
  Ariel Morado Jr.

Medical staff

- Physical therapist:
  Anna Liza Demegillo

== First All-Filipino Conference ==
=== Preliminary round ===
==== Standings ====
Pos	Team	Pld	W	L	Pts	SW	SL	SR	SPW	SPL	SPR	Qualification
1	Creamline Cool Smashers	8	7	1	22	23	5	4.600	674	509	1.324	Final round
2	Petro Gazz Angels	8	6	2	19	20	7	2.857	651	550	1.184	Final round
3	PLDT High Speed Hitters	8	6	2	18	20	10	2.000	697	613	1.137	Final round
4	F2 Logistics Cargo Movers	8	6	2	16	18	12	1.500	646	653	0.989	Final round
5	Chery Tiggo Crossovers	8	4	4	13	15	13	1.154	633	595	1.064	

==== Match log ====
2023 PVL First All-Filipino Conference preliminary round match log
Total: 7–1 (22 points)
February: 5–1 (16 points)

Match	Date	Opponent	Sets	Total	Location Attendance	Record	Pts	Report
1	February 4, 2023	Petro Gazz	3–0	75–60	Smart Araneta Coliseum; 9,853	1–0	3	P2
2	February 9, 2023	Cignal	3–0	75–52	Filoil EcoOil Centre; 3,282	2–0	6	P2
3	February 14, 2023	Choco Mucho	3–0	75–45	Smart Araneta Coliseum; 9,575	3–0	9	P2
4	February 18, 2023	F2 Logistics	2–3	105–105	PhilSports Arena; 6,765	3–1	10	P2
5	February 25, 2023	Chery Tiggo Crossovers	3–1	92–76	PhilSports Arena; 5,562	4–1	13	P2
6	February 28, 2023	Army	3–0	75–47	PhilSports Arena; 650	5–1	16	P2

March: 2–0 (6 points)

Match	Date	Opponent	Sets	Total	Location Attendance	Record	Pts	Report
7	March 7, 2023	PLDT	3–0	75–58	PhilSports Arena; 7,607	6–1	19	P2
8	March 14, 2023	Akari	3–1	102–76	University of San Agustin; 3,514	7–1	22	P2

=== Final round ===
==== Bracket ====
Semifinals
March 18–21
1 Creamline	3	3
4 F2 Logistics	1	0
March 18–23
2 Petro Gazz	3	1	3
3 PLDT	1	3	0

Championship
March 26–30
Creamline	1	3	3
Petro Gazz	3	2	1
3rd place match
March 26–28
F2 Logistics	3	3
PLDT	1	1

==== Match log ====
2023 PVL First All-Filipino Conference final round match log
Total: 4–1 (11 points)
Semifinals: 2–0 (6 points)

Match	Date	Opponent	Sets	Total	Location Attendance	Series	Report
1	March 18, 2023	F2 Logistics	3–1	98–82	PhilSports Arena; 6,471	1–0	P2
2	March 21, 2023	F2 Logistics	3–0	75–61	SM Mall of Asia Arena; 7,741	2–0	P2

Championship: 2–1 (5 points)

Match	Date	Opponent	Sets	Total	Location Attendance	Series	Report
1	March 26, 2023	Petro Gazz	1–3	95–100	SM Mall of Asia Arena; 11,532	0–1	P2
2	March 28, 2023	Petro Gazz	3–2	106–90	SM Mall of Asia Arena; 9,929	1–1	P2
3	March 30, 2023	Petro Gazz	3–1	95–78	SM Mall of Asia Arena; 12,175	2–1	P2

== Invitational Conference ==
=== Preliminary round ===
==== Pool A standings ====
Pos	Team	Pld	W	L	Pts	SW	SL	SR	SPW	SPL	SPR	Qualification
1	Creamline Cool Smashers	4	4	0	12	12	1	12.000	325	252	1.290	Final round
2	PLDT High Speed Hitters	4	3	1	8	9	5	1.800	213	190	1.121	Final round
3	Chery Tiggo Crossovers	4	2	2	6	8	8	1.000	240	226	1.062	Classification round
4	Akari Chargers	4	1	3	3	6	11	0.545	352	388	0.907	Classification round
5	Quezon City Gerflor Defenders	4	0	4	1	2	12	0.167	266	340	0.782	Classification round

Source: PhilSports.ph

==== Match log ====
2023 PVL Invitational Conference preliminary round match log
Total: 4–0 (12 points)
June: 2–0 (6 points)

Match	Date	Opponent	Sets	Total	Location Attendance	Record	Pts	Report
1	June 27, 2023	Chery Tiggo	3–0	75–61	Filoil EcoOil Centre; 3,685	1–0	3	P2
2	June 29, 2023	Gerflor	3–0	75–41	Filoil EcoOil Centre; 2,117	2–0	6	P2

July: 2–0 (6 points)

Match	Date	Opponent	Sets	Total	Location Attendance	Record	Pts	Report
3	July 13, 2023	PLDT	3–0	75–62	PhilSports Arena; 2,136	3–0	9	P2
4	July 15, 2023	Akari	3–1	100–88	PhilSports Arena; 6,825	4–0	12	P2

=== Final round ===
==== Semifinals standings ====
Pos	Team	Pld	W	L	Pts	SW	SL	SR	SPW	SPL	SPR	Qualification
1	Kurashiki Ablaze	5	5	0	15	15	3	5.000	439	351	1.251	Championship match
2	Creamline Cool Smashers	5	4	1	10	13	7	1.857	447	416	1.075	Championship match
3	Cignal HD Spikers	5	2	3	7	9	9	1.000	405	396	1.023	3rd place match
4	F2 Logistics Cargo Movers	5	2	3	7	8	11	0.727	421	432	0.975	3rd place match
5	PLDT High Speed Hitters	5	2	3	6	7	9	0.778	347	366	0.948	

Source: PhilSports.ph

==== Match log ====
2023 PVL Invitational Conference final round match log
Total: 3–2 (8 points)
Semifinals: 3–1 (7 points)

Match	Date	Opponent	Sets	Total	Location Attendance	Record	Pts	Report
– (Note: The result of Creamline's game against PLDT in the Invitational Conference preliminary round was carried over to the final round. It is shown for the purpose of completeness.)	July 13, 2023	PLDT	3–0	75–62	PhilSports Arena; 2,136	1–0	3	P2
1	July 20, 2023	F2 Logistics	3–2	105–100	PhilSports Arena; 7,018	2–0	5	P2
2	July 22, 2023	Cignal	3–2	112–98	PhilSports Arena; 6,430	3–0	7	P2
3	July 25, 2023	Bắc Ninh	3–0	75–63	PhilSports Arena; 3,393	4–0	10	P2
4	July 28, 2023	Kurashiki	1–3	80–93	PhilSports Arena; 5,121	4–1	10	P2

Championship: 0–1 (1 point)

Date	Opponent	Sets	Total	Location Attendance	Report
July 30, 2023	Kurashiki	2–3	105–104	PhilSports Arena; 8,223	P2

== Second All-Filipino Conference ==
=== Preliminary round ===
==== Standings ====
Pos	Team	Pld	W	L	Pts	SW	SL	SR	SPW	SPL	SPR	Qualification
1	Creamline Cool Smashers	11	11	0	32	33	7	4.714	977	786	1.243	Final round
2	Choco Mucho Flying Titans	11	10	1	29	31	7	4.429	899	724	1.242	Final round
3	Cignal HD Spikers	11	8	3	25	26	15	1.733	947	842	1.125	Final round
4	Chery Tiggo Crossovers	11	8	3	22	26	16	1.625	851	809	1.052	Final round
5	PLDT High Speed Hitters	11	7	4	21	25	15	1.667	914	901	1.014	

Source: PhilSports.ph

==== Match log ====
2023 PVL Second All-Filipino Conference preliminary round match log
Total: 11–0 (32 points)
October: 4–0 (12 points)

Match	Date	Opponent	Sets	Total	Location Attendance	Record	Pts	Report
1	October 15, 2023	Choco Mucho	3–1	99–81	Smart Araneta Coliseum; 14,014	1–0	3	P2
2	October 21, 2023	Cignal	3–0	75–56	Batangas City Sports Center; 4,607	2–0	6	P2
3	October 26, 2023	Gerflor	3–0	75–37	Ynares Center; 4,481	3–0	9	P2
4	October 31, 2023	Farm Fresh	3–1	96–88	Filoil EcoOil Centre; 1,607	4–0	12	P2

November: 6–0 (17 points)

Match	Date	Opponent	Sets	Total	Location Attendance	Record	Pts	Report
5	November 9, 2023	Petro Gazz	3–2	113–106	PhilSports Arena; 2,295	5–0	14	P2
6	November 14, 2023	F2 Logistics	3–0	75–56	Smart Araneta Coliseum; 4,228	6–0	17	P2
7	November 18, 2023	PLDT	3–0	75–63	Aquilino Q. Pimentel Jr. International Convention Center; 9,862	7–0	20	P2
8	November 23, 2023	Nxled	3–0	75–60	PhilSports Arena; 2,328	8–0	23	P2
9	November 28, 2023	Chery Tiggo	3–1	99–84	PhilSports Arena; 3,167	9–0	26	P2
10	November 30, 2023	Akari	3–1	101–87	PhilSports Arena; 1,133	10–0	29	P2

December: 1–0 (3 points)

Match	Date	Opponent	Sets	Total	Location Attendance	Record	Pts	Report
11	December 5, 2023	Galeries Tower	3–1	94–68	PhilSports Arena; 570	11–0	32	P2

=== Final round ===
==== Bracket ====
Semifinals
December 7–9
1 Creamline	3	3
4 Chery Tiggo	0	0
December 7–12
2 Choco Mucho	2	3	3
3 Cignal	3	0	1

Championship
December 14–16
Creamline	3	3
Choco Mucho	1	2
3rd place match
December 14–16
Chery Tiggo	1	1
Cignal	3	3

==== Match log ====
2023 PVL Second All-Filipino Conference final round match log
Total: 4–0 (11 points)
Semifinals: 2–0 (6 points)

Match	Date	Opponent	Sets	Total	Location Attendance	Series	Report
1	December 7, 2023	Chery Tiggo	3–0	77–65	PhilSports Arena; 2,366	1–0	P2
2	December 9, 2023	Chery Tiggo	3–0	76–66	PhilSports Arena; 6,183	2–0	P2

Championship: 2–0 (5 points)

Match	Date	Opponent	Sets	Total	Location Attendance	Series	Report
1	December 14, 2023	Choco Mucho	3–1	95–94	SM Mall of Asia Arena; 8,840	1–0	P2
2	December 16, 2023	Choco Mucho	3–2	115–110	Smart Araneta Coliseum; 24,459	2–0	P2

== Transactions ==
=== Additions ===
Player	Date signed	Previous team	Ref.
Bernadeth Pons	June 2, 2023	Creamline Beach Volleyball (beach volleyball)	
Theo Bea Bonafe	October 13, 2023	UST Golden Tigresses (UAAP)	
Mafe Galanza	October 13, 2023	UP Lady Fighting Maroons (UAAP)	

=== Subtractions ===
Player	New team	Ref.
Jia de Guzman	Denso Airybees (V.League Japan)	
