= Journal of Oleo Science =

- Discipline: Chemical engineering, biochemistry
- Language: English
- Edited by: Osamu Shibata

Publication details
- Former name(s): Journal of Oil Chemists' Society, Japan; Journal of Japan Oil Chemists' Society
- History: 1952–present
- Publisher: Japan Oil Chemists' Society (Japan)
- Frequency: Monthly
- Impact factor: 1.601 (2020)

Standard abbreviations
- ISO 4: J. Oleo Sci.

Indexing
- CODEN: JOSOAP
- ISSN: 1345-8957 (print); 1347-3352 (web)
- LCCN: 2002209356
- OCLC no.: 637700169

Links
- Journal homepage; Online access; Online archive

The Journal of Oleo Science is a monthly peer-reviewed academic journal covering the various agricultural, biological, chemical, health, medical, nutritional, and physical properties of fats and oils. It is published by the Japan Oil Chemists' Society and the editor-in-chief is Osamu Shibata (Nagasaki International University).

== History ==
The journal was established in 1952 as the Journal of Oil Chemists' Society, Japan and was published exclusively in Japanese for the first 4 volumes. From 1956 until 2000 (vols. 5–49), the journal was renamed Journal of Japan Oil Chemists' Society and published articles in English or Japanese. It obtained its current name in 2011 (vols 50–present), when it became an exclusively English-language journal. The journal was licensed under "Creative Commons attribution 4.0" in February 2021 and indexed in the DOAJ (Directory of Open Access Journals) on April 13, 2021.

== Abstracting and indexing ==
The journal is abstracted and indexed in:

- CAB Abstracts
- Chemical Abstracts Service
- Ei Compendex
- Embase
- Food Science & Technology Abstracts
- Index Medicus/MEDLINE/PubMed
- Science Citation Index Expanded
- Scopus
- Directory of Open Access Journals

According to the Journal Citation Reports, the journal has a 2020 impact factor of 1.601.
