= Tatsuya Mochizuki =

Japanese footballer and manager

Tatsuya Mochizuki 望月 達也
Personal information
- Full name: Tatsuya Mochizuki
- Date of birth: April 20, 1963 (age 63)
- Place of birth: Shizuoka, Shizuoka, Japan
- Height: 1.67 m (5 ft 5 1/2 in)
- Position: Midfielder

Youth career
- 1979–1981: Shimizu Higashi High School

Senior career*
Years	Team	Apps	(Gls)
1982–1985	Haarlem	3	(0)
1986	Telstar	0	(0)
1986–1990	Yamaha Motors	28	(0)
Total		31	(0)

Managerial career
- 2002: Avispa Fukuoka (caretaker)
- 2004: Shonan Bellmare (caretaker)
- 2007: Vegalta Sendai
- 2012: Kawasaki Frontale (caretaker)
- 2018–2021: ReinMeer Aomori
Medal record
Yamaha Motors
Winner	Japan Soccer League	1987/88
Runner-up	JSL Cup	1989
Runner-up	Emperor's Cup	1989
- * Club domestic league appearances and goals

Tatsuya Mochizuki (望月 達也, Mochizuki Tatsuya; born April 20, 1963) is a former Japanese football player and manager.

== Playing career ==
Mochizuki was born in Shizuoka on April 20, 1963. After graduating from Shimizu Higashi High School, he played professionally in the Netherlands for Haarlem and Telstar between 1982 and 1986. In 1986, he moved back to Japan to play for Yamaha Motors, which later became Júbilo Iwata.

== Coaching career ==
After retiring as a player, Mochizuki began his coaching career and held several positions with the Júbilo Iwata football club before leaving in 2002 to become the coach of Avispa Fukuoka's youth team. He was selected to be the manager of Vegalta Sendai, in the J.League, beginning in the 2007 season. However, Sendai failed to return to Division 1 and he resigned from the job after the season. He has previously served as a coach of Vegalta, Shonan Bellmare, and Avispa Fukuoka and also filled in as interim manager at each of those three teams.

== Managerial statistics ==
Team	From	To	Record				
Team	From	To	G	W	D	L	Win %
Avispa Fukuoka	2002	2002	3	1	0	2	33.33
Shonan Bellmare	2004	2004	11	3	3	5	27.27
Vegalta Sendai	2007	2007	48	24	11	13	50.00
Total			62	28	14	20	45.16
