= Eimei High School =

- 英明高等学校
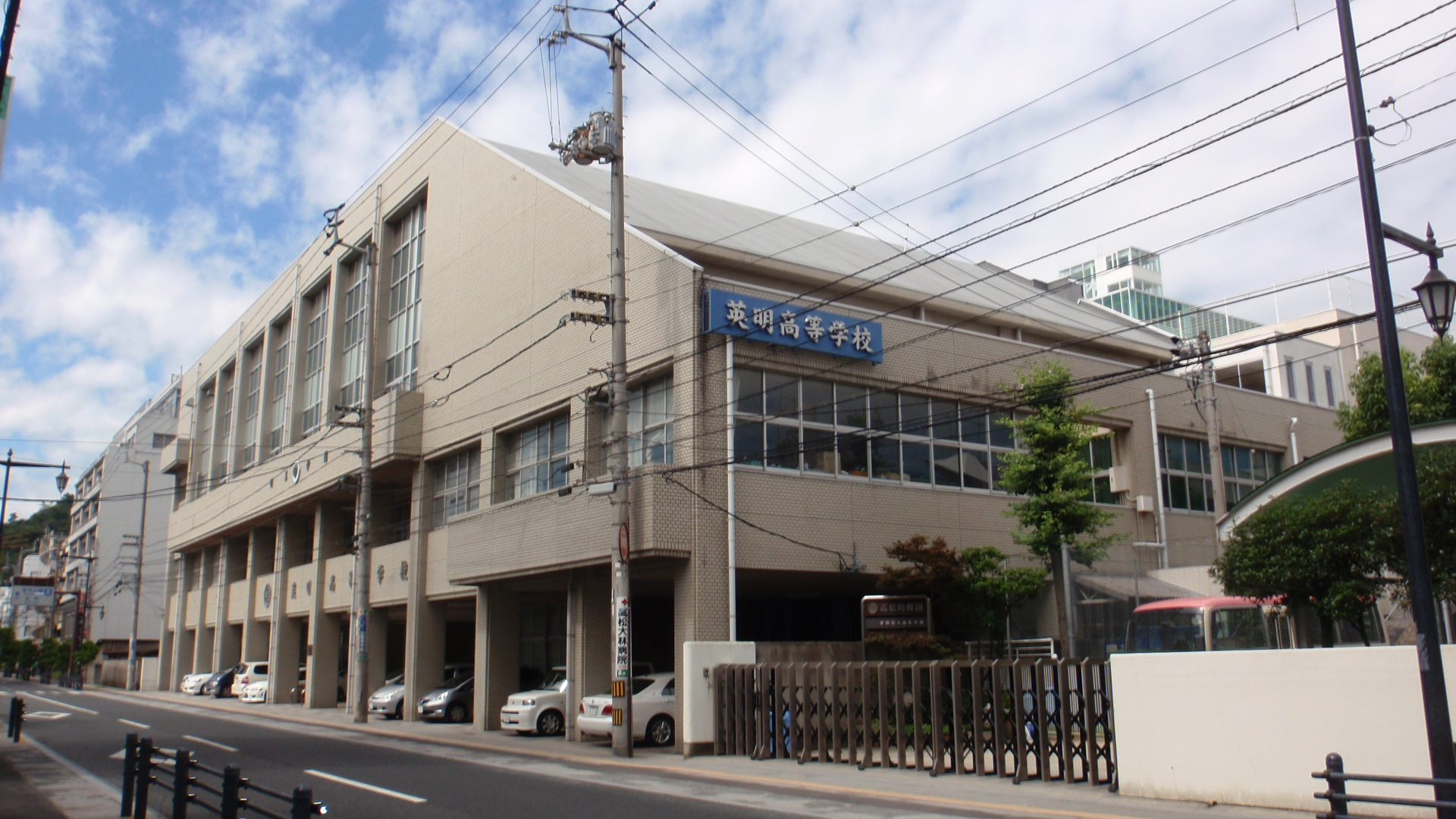

Location
- Takamatsu City, Kagawa Prefecture; 760-0006; Japan
- Coordinates: 34°20′13.66″N 134°2′35.3″E

Information
- Type: Private
- Motto: Independence (自主, jishu), responsibility (責任, sekinin), courtesy (礼儀, reigi)
- Established: 1917
- Founder: Kagawa Prefecture Eizen Gakuen Inc.
- Gender: co-educational
- Website: www.eimei.ed.jp

Eimei High School (Japanese: 英明高等学校, Hepburn: Eimei Kōtōgakkō) is a private co-educational senior high school located in Takamatsu City, Kagawa Prefecture, Japan.

The high school was founded in 1917 by the educational corporation Kagawa Prefecture Eizen Gakuen

== History ==
Eimei was founded in 1917 as the Meizen Girls' High School (私立明善高等女学校開校, Shiritsu Meizen Kōtō Joshigakkō). Near the end of World War II, the school was destroyed in the early hours of July 4, 1945, during the air raid on Takamatsu. The school was rebuilt and opened as a high school under the new educational system in April 1948, adopting the name Meizen High School (香川県明善高等学校, Kagawa-ken Meizen Kōtōgakkō). In April 2001 the school became a co-educational school and changed its name to its current name.

The Meizen Gakuen corporation previously operated a junior high school and Kagawaken Meizen Junior College on the same campus. The Meizen Junior High School (香川県明善中学校, Kagawa-ken Meizen Chūgakkō) was established in April 1947 and suspended operations in April 2002. Kagawaken Meizen Junior College was established in 1956; it last accepted students in 2002 and closed in 2004.

== Courses ==
The school offers four courses; special advancement, advancement, information technology and general. The advancement course is divided into two streams.

== Sports clubs ==
=== Baseball ===
The school baseball club was founded in 2005. In its sixth year of existence it won the Kagawa prefectural tournament and qualified for the 2010 national high school championships. In its first round match against The First High School Attached to Hachinohe Institute of Technology, Eimei surrendered four runs in the fifth inning before tying the score in the sixth. However, they allowed another four runs in the eighth inning, exiting the first round of the tournament in a 4-8 loss.

In 2011 the school defended its prefectural title and advanced to the second round of the national championship, led by ace pitcher Ryuya Matsumoto. Eimei defeated Okinawa Prefecture's Itoman High School 4-1 in the first round but lost to Akita Prefecture's Noshiro Shoyo High School 0-2 in the second round.
