= Kazuto Takezawa =

Japanese footballer

Personal information
- Date of birth: 27 October 1999 (age 27)
- Place of birth: Ibaraki, Japan
- Height: 1.66 m (5 ft 5 in)
- Position: Midfielder

Team information
- Current team: Verspah Oita
- Number: 20

Youth career
- Ounan Fighters SC
- –2017: Kashima Antlers

College career
Years	Team	Apps	(Gls)
2018–2021	Tokyo Gakugei University		

Senior career*
Years	Team	Apps	(Gls)
2022–2024	FC Ryukyu	79	(3)
2025–	Verspah Oita	2	(0)
- * Club domestic league appearances and goals as of 15 March 2025

Kazuto Takezawa (武沢 一翔, Takezawa Kazuto; born 27 October 1999) is a Japanese footballer who plays as a midfielder for Japan Football League club Verspah Oita.

== Career statistics ==
=== Club ===
As of 20 February 2022.

Club	Season	League			National Cup		League Cup		Other		Total	
Club	Season	Division	Apps	Goals	Apps	Goals	Apps	Goals	Apps	Goals	Apps	Goals
FC Ryukyu	2022	J2 League	1	0	0	0	0	0	0	0	1	0
Career total			1	0	0	0	0	0	0	0	1	0
