= Kagawaken Meizen Junior College =

Coordinates: 34.3369°N 134.0427°E

Kagawaken Meizen Junior College (香川県明善短期大学, Kagawaken Meizen Tanki Daigaku) was a junior college in Takamatsu, Kagawa, Japan, and was part of the Kagawa Meizen Gakuen network.

== History ==
The institute was founded as Meizen Koutou Jogakkou in 1917, and became Kagawaken Meizen Junior College in 1956. In 1969 a new campus was founded, but in 2000 this was discontinued. In 2004 Kagawaken Meizen Junior College closed because of decrease in the number of students.

== Legacy ==
In 2023, a survey of companies headquartered in the four prefectures of Shikoku found that five female company presidents were graduates of Meizen Junior College in Kagawa Prefecture.
