= Yasukawa =

Yasukawa (written: 安川) is a Japanese surname. Notable people with the surname include:

- Act Yasukawa (安川 惡斗, born 1986), Japanese professional wrestler
- Roger Yasukawa (born 1977), American auto racing driver
- Takeshi Yasukawa (安川 壮, 1914–2000), Japanese diplomat
- Yu Yasukawa (安川 有, born 1988), Japanese football player
- Shōgo Yasukawa (ヤスカワショウゴ), Japanese scriptwriter and headwriter
