= Kyoto Tachibana University =

Private university in Yamashina, Japan

Coordinates: 34°58′6.3″N 135°49′34.1″E

- 京都橘大学
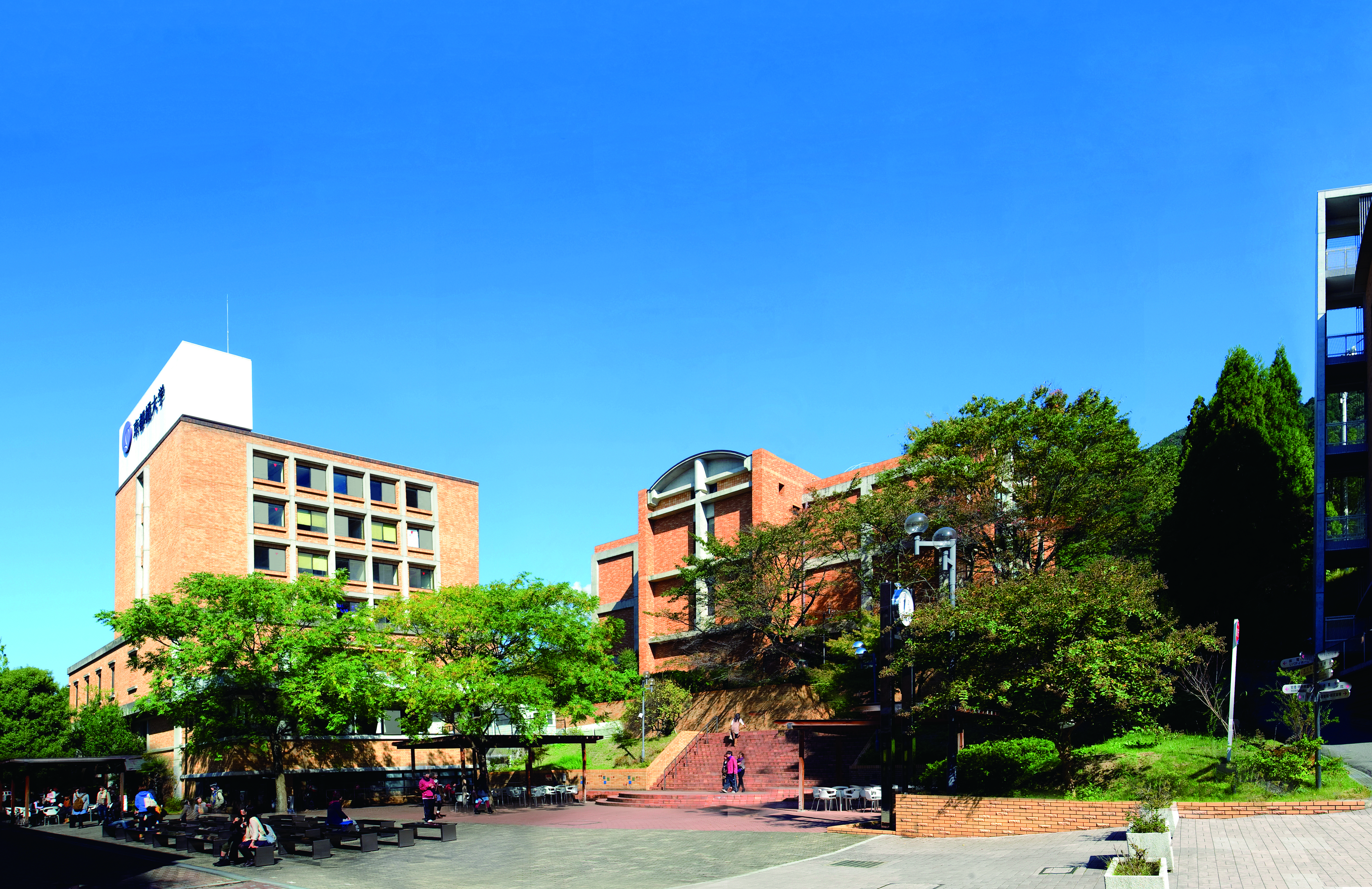
- Former names: Tachibana Women's University; Kyoto Tachibana Women's University
- Motto: 変化を楽しむ人であれ
- Motto in English: Be a person who enjoys change
- Type: Private
- Established: 1902; 124 years ago (chartered in 1997)
- Founders: Takeo Nakamori
- President: Eiko Hibino
- Students: 6,487
- Undergraduates: 6,389
- Postgraduates: 98
- Location: 34 Yamada-cho Oyake Yamashina-ku, Kyoto, Kyoto Prefecture, 607-8175, Japan
- Colours: 古代紫(Ancient purple)
- Website: www.tachibana-u.ac.jp/english/index.html

Kyoto Tachibana University (京都橘大学, Kyōto Tachibana Daigaku) is a private university in Yamashina, Kyoto, Japan.

The university was founded in 1967 (59 years ago) as a private university for women with the motto "to encourage and foster independent women". In 2005, the university became co-educational.

== Faculties/Graduate Schools ==
=== Faculties ===
- Faculty of English and Global Communication
- Faculty of Humanities
- Faculty of Human Development and Education
- Faculty of Comprehensive Psychology
- Faculty of Economics
- Faculty of Business Administration
- Faculty of Engineering
- Faculty of Nursing
- Faculty of Health Sciences

=== Graduate Schools ===
- Graduate School of Humanities
- Graduate School of Contemporary Business
- Graduate School of Nursing
- Graduate School of Health Sciences
