= New Aomori Prefecture General Sports Park =

Sports facility in Aomori, Japan

Coordinates: 40.843349°N 140.839969°E

Kakuhiro Group Athletics Stadium
- カクヒログループ アスレチックスタジアム

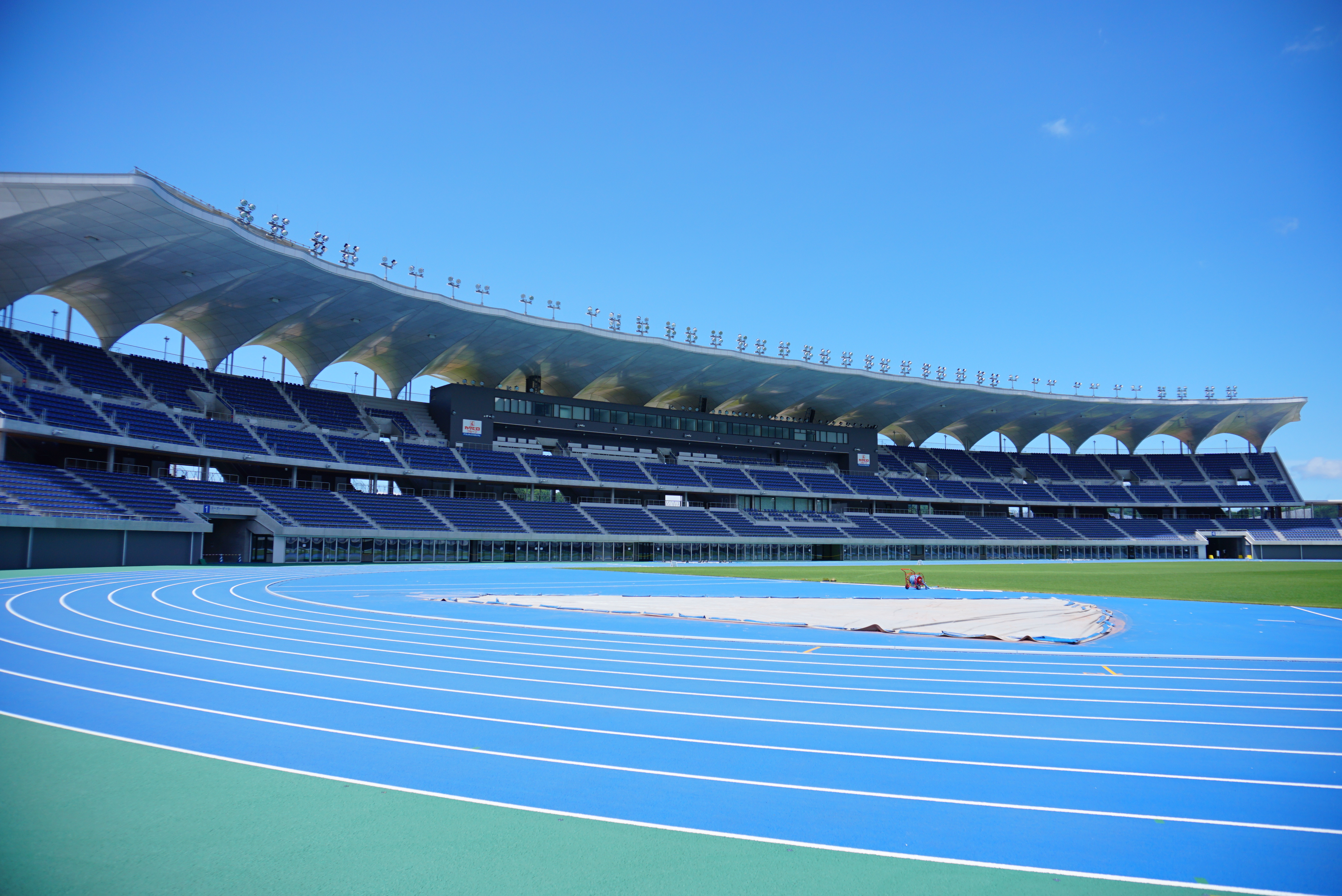
- Kakuhiro Group Athletic Stadium
- Interactive map of Kakuhiro Group Athletics Stadium
- Address: Aomori; Japan
- Owner: Aomori Prefecture
- Capacity: 20,809

Construction
- Opened: 1 September 2019
- Cost: JPY 20 billion

Tenant
- ReinMeer Aomori

Website
- pref.aomori.lg.jp/kouen

New Aomori Prefecture General Sports Park (Japanese: 新青森県総合運動公園) is a group of sports facilities in Aomori, Aomori, Japan.

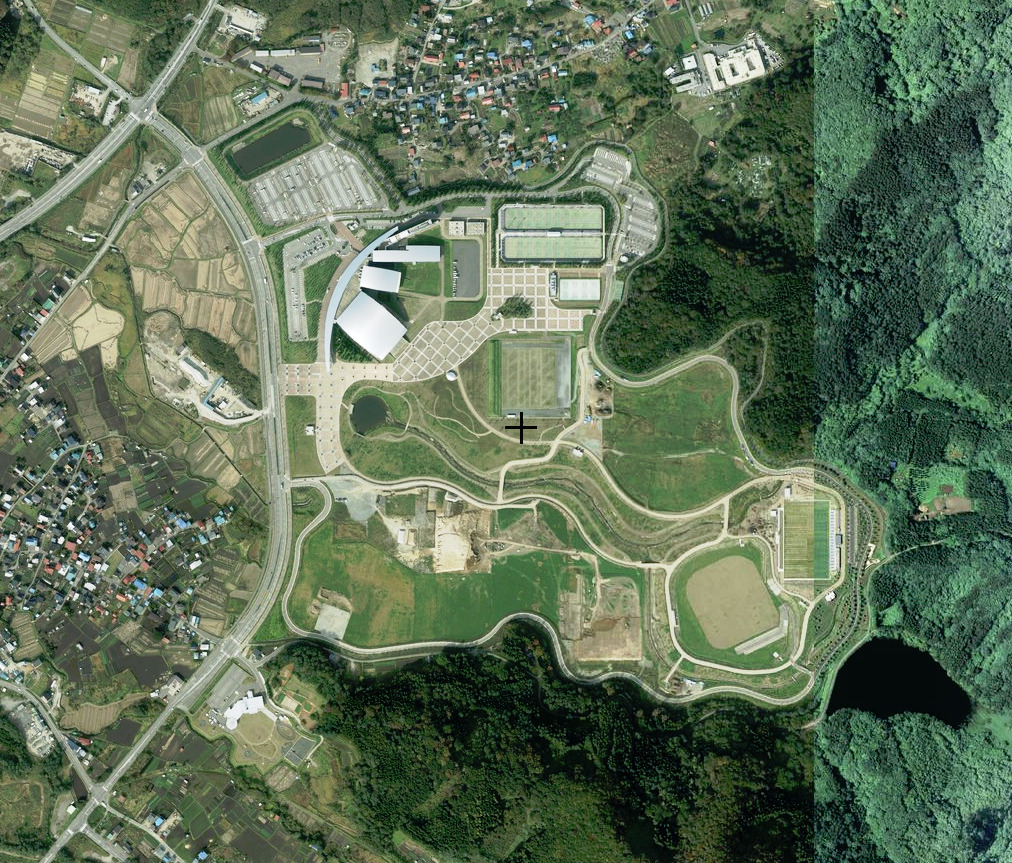
New Aomori Prefectural General Sports Park

The Kakuhiro Group Athletic Stadiums is an athletic stadium in Aomori, Aomori, Japan. The facilities are the home venue for the ReinMeer Aomori, a Japan Football League team.

Maeda Arena

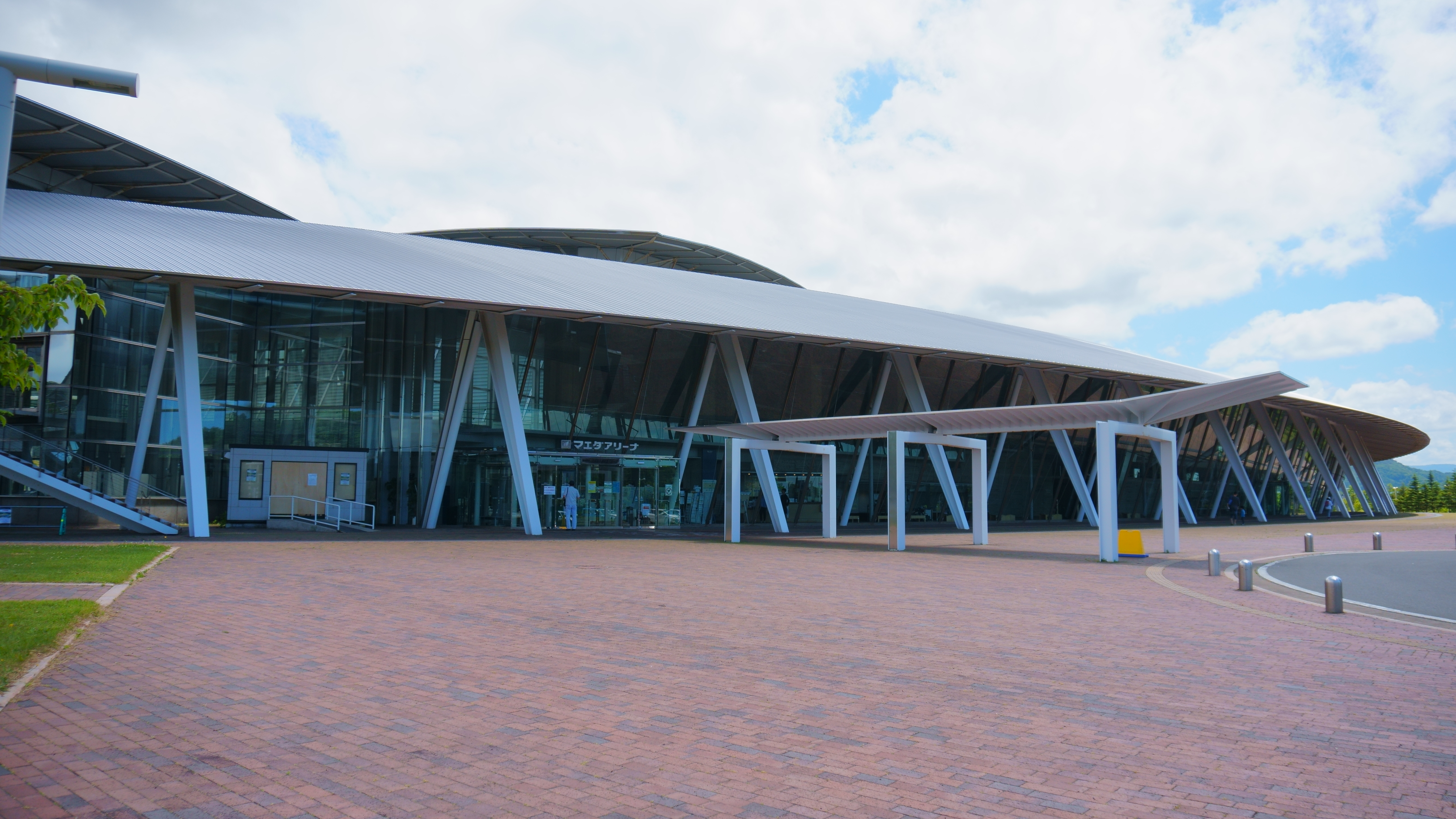

- Location within Aomori Prefecture Location within Japan
- Interactive map of Maeda Arena
- Full name: Aoimori Arena
- Location: Aomori, Aomori, Japan
- Owner: Aomori Prefecture
- Operator: Aomori Prefecture
- Capacity: 5,371

Construction
- Opened: November 2002
- Main contractor: Tomoe Corporation

Tenant
- Aomori Wat's

The Maeda Arena is an indoor arena in Aomori, Japan. The arena used mainly for indoor sports. The facility has a capacity of 5,500 people and was opened in 2002. It hosted the figure skating as well as the opening and closing ceremonies for the 2003 Winter Asian Games. It is a part of New Aomori Prefectural General Sports Park.
