= Akita University =

Japanese national university

- 秋田大学
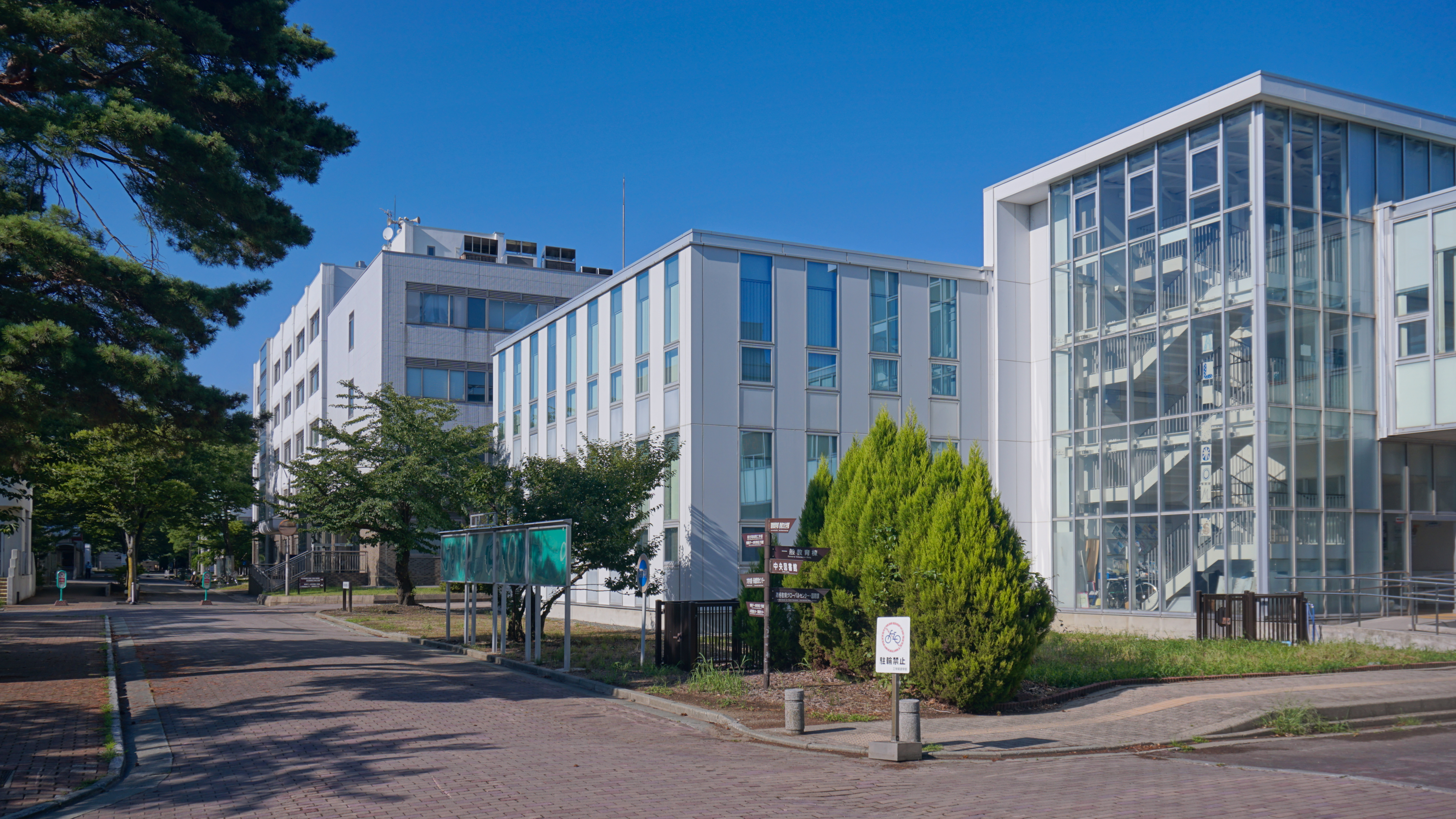
- Type: National
- Established: 1949
- President: Fumio Yamamoto
- Students: 5,000
- Location: Akita, Akita, Japan; 39°43′41″N 140°08′02″E
- Website: https://www.akita-u.ac.jp/eng/
- Japan Akita Prefecture

Akita University (秋田大学, Akita Daigaku) is a Japanese national university in Akita City, Japan. Established in 1949, it comprises four graduate schools and four undergraduate faculties.

== History ==
Akita University was established in 1949 by the merger of Akita Normal School (established in 1878), Akita Mining College (established in 1910) and the Akita Youth Normal School (established in 1944). The university initially offered degrees in Liberal Arts and Sciences and in Mining Engineering. In 1965, a graduate studies program in mining engineering was established. In 1967, Akita University established a Department of Education, followed in 1970 by a Medical School and University Hospital in 1971. A graduate program in medicine was established in 1976, and a graduate program in Education in 1989. A College of Medical Sciences was also established in 1989.

== Organization ==
=== Undergraduate ===
- Faculty of International Resource Sciences
  - Department of Resource Policy and Management
  - Department of Earth Resource Science
  - Department of Earth Resource Engineering and Environmental Science
- Faculty of Education and Human Studies
  - Department of School Education
  - Department of Regional Studies and Humanities
- Faculty of Medicine
  - School of Medicine
  - School of Health Sciences
- Faculty of Engineering Science
  - Department of Life Science
    - Life Science Course
  - Department of Materials Science
    - Applied Chemistry Course
    - Materials Science and Engineering Course
  - Department of Mathematical Science and Electrical-Electron-Computer Engineering
    - Mathematical Science Course
    - Electrical and Electronic Engineering Course
    - Human-Centered Computing Course
  - Department of Systems Design Engineering
    - Mechanical Engineering Course
    - Creative Engineering Course
    - Civil and Environmental Engineering Course

=== Graduate ===
- Graduate School of International Resource Sciences
  - Department of Earth Resource Science (Master's program)
  - Department of Earth Resource Engineering and Environmental Science (Master's program)
  - Department of Geosciences, Geotechnology, and Materials Engineering for Resources (PhD program)
- Graduate School of Education (Master's program)
- Graduate School of Medicine
  - Medical Science (Master's program)
  - Medicine (Doctoral program)
  - Health Science (Doctoral program)
- Graduate School of Engineering Science
  - Department of Life Science (Master's program)
    - Life Science Course
  - Department of Materials Science (Master's program)
    - Applied Chemistry Course
    - Materials Science and Engineering Course
  - Department of Mathematical Science and Electrical-Electron-Computer Engineering (Master's program)
    - Mathematical Science Course
    - Electrical and Electronic Engineering Course
    - Human-Centered Computing Course
  - Department of Systems Design Engineering (Master's program)
    - Mechanical Engineering Course
    - Creative Engineering Course
    - Civil and Environmental Engineering Course
  - Cooperative Major in Life Cycle Design Engineering (Master's program)
  - Department of Integrated Engineering Science (PhD program)
    - Field of Life Science
    - Field of Materials Science
    - Field of Mathematical Science and Electrical-Electronic-Computer Engineering
    - Field of Systems Design Engineering

== Akita University Medical FC ==
Akita University Medical FC
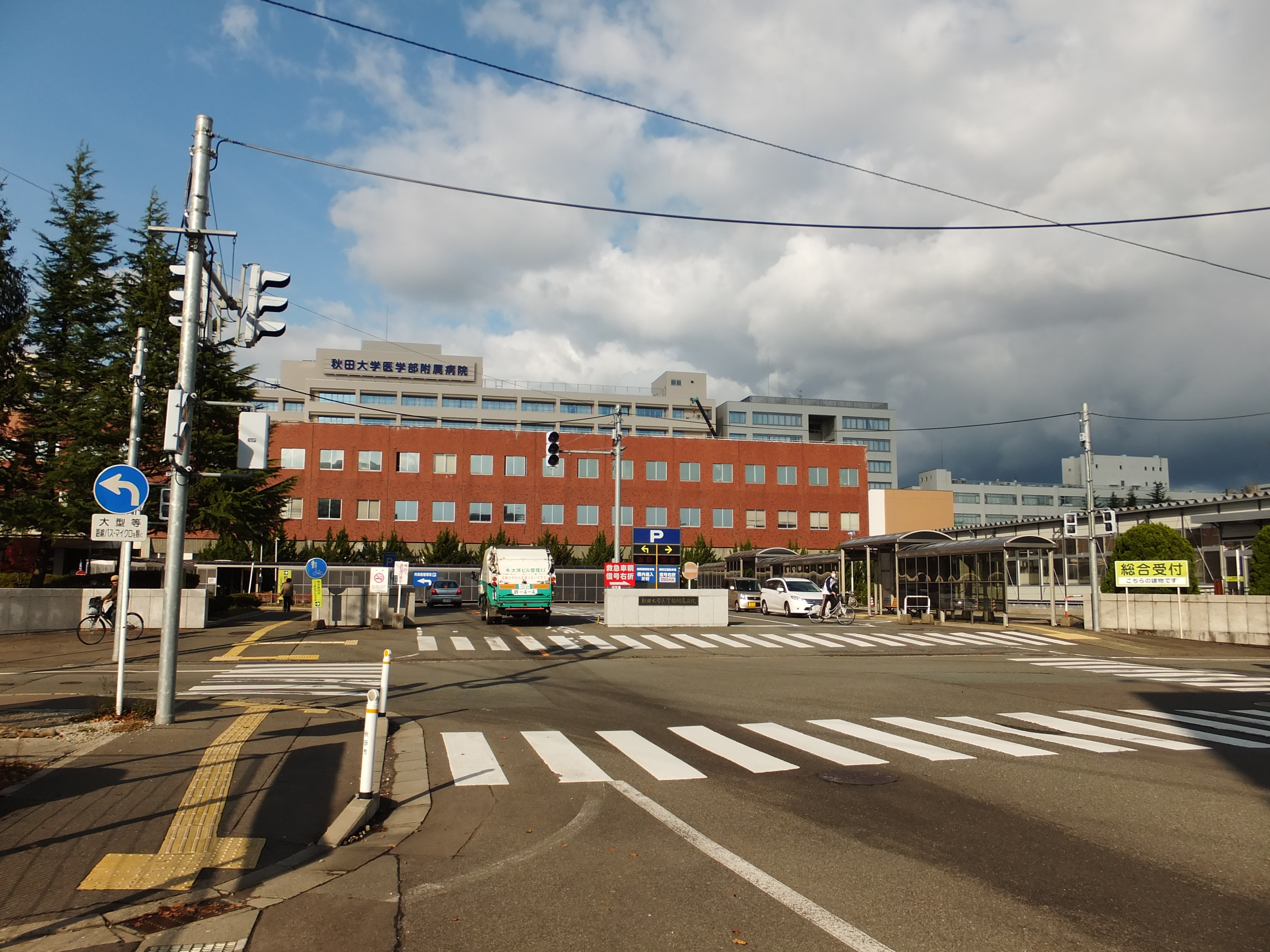
- Akita University Hospital
- Ground: Akita University Athletic Field
- Coordinates: 39°43′40.7″N 140°07′54.8″E
- League: Akita Prefecture League
- Website: https://sites.google.com/site/akitauniversitymedfc/home
Home colours	Away colours

Akita University Medical FC (秋田大学医学部サッカー部, Akita Daigaku Igakubu Sakka-bu) is a Japanese football club based in Akita, the capital city of Akita Prefecture. They play in the Akita Prefecture League. Their team colour is blue.

=== League record ===
Champions	Runners-up	Third place	Promoted	Relegated

Season	League	League Position	GP	W	D	L	F	A	GD	Pts	Emperor's Cup	Shakaijin Cup
2012	Akita Prefecture League	1st									-	-
2013	Tohoku D2N	8th	18	5	2	11	21	33	−12	17	-	-
2014	Tohoku D2N	4th	18	6	6	6	24	33	−9	24	-	-
2015	Tohoku D2N	5th	18	8	4	6	39	25	14	28	-	-
2016	Tohoku D2N	3rd	18	10	2	6	42	35	7	32	-	-
2017	Tohoku D2N	4th	18	12	1	5	58	37	21	37	-	-
2018	Tohoku D2N	3rd	18	12	1	5	53	19	34	37	-	-
2019	Tohoku D2N	7th	18	8	1	9	50	39	11	25	-	-

=== Honours ===
- Akita Prefecture Soccer League:
  - Champions: 2012
- National University Tournament:
  - Champions: 2017
