= Yusuke Imamura =

Japanese footballer

Yusuke Imamura 今村 優介
Personal information
- Date of birth: 27 December 1997 (age 28)
- Place of birth: Kawasaki, Kanagawa, Japan
- Height: 1.80 m (5 ft 11 in)
- Position: Forward

Team information
- Current team: FC Osaka
- Number: 9

Youth career
- –2019: Kanto Gakuin University

Senior career*
Years	Team	Apps	(Gls)
2020–2021	Azul Claro Numazu	45	(5)
2023-	FC Osaka	18	(0)
- * Club domestic league appearances and goals as of 14 January 2024

Yusuke Imamura (今村 優介, Imamura Yusuke; born 27 December 1997) is a Japanese footballer currently playing as a forward for FC Osaka.

== Career statistics ==
=== Club ===
As of 10 November 2020.

Club	Season	League			National Cup		League Cup		Other		Total	
Club	Season	Division	Apps	Goals	Apps	Goals	Apps	Goals	Apps	Goals	Apps	Goals
Azul Claro Numazu	2020	J3 League	22	3	0	0	–		0	0	22	3
Career total			22	3	0	0	0	0	0	0	22	3
