= Nagasaki International University =

Private university in Nagasaki, Japan

Coordinates: 33°06′09″N 129°47′27″E

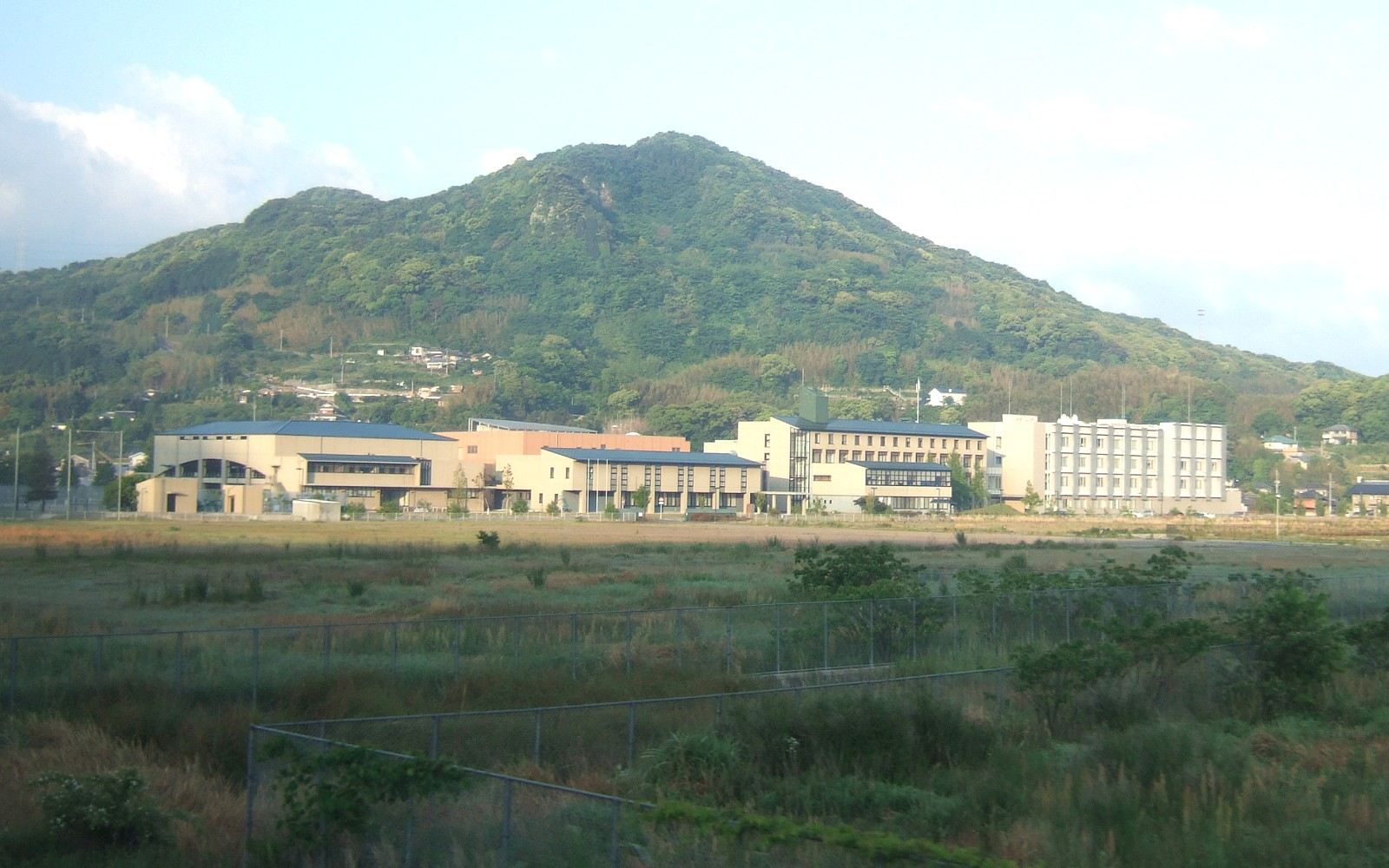
Nagasaki International University Campus

Nagasaki International University (長崎国際大学, Nagasaki kokusai daigaku) is a private university in Sasebo, Nagasaki, Japan, established in 2000.
