= List of J3 League football transfers winter 2018–19 =

This is a list of Japanese football J3 League transfers in the winter transfer window 2018–19 by club.

== J3 League ==
=== Roasso Kumamoto ===
In: Note: Flags indicate national team as defined under FIFA eligibility rules; some limited exceptions apply. Players may hold more than one non-FIFA nationality.

No.	Pos.	Nation	Player
3	DF	JPN	Keisuke Ogasawara (from University of Tsukuba)
4	DF	JPN	Shuichi Sakai (from Tokai University Kumamoto)
9	FW	JPN	Kazuki Hara (from (Japan) Kamatamare Sanuki)
11	FW	JPN	Kohei Mishima (from (Japan) Matsumoto Yamaga)
13	FW	JPN	Tomoya Kitamura (from Miyazaki Sangyo-keiei University)
14	MF	JPN	Hikaru Nakahara (from Komazawa University)
16	MF	JPN	Shota Tamura (from (Japan) Fukushima United FC)
22	GK	JPN	Kaito Yamamoto (from (Japan) JEF United Chiba)
31	MF	JPN	Tomotaka Okamoto (from (Japan) Matsumoto Yamaga)

Out: Note: Flags indicate national team as defined under FIFA eligibility rules; some limited exceptions apply. Players may hold more than one non-FIFA nationality.

No.	Pos.	Nation	Player
3	DF	KOR	Lim Jin-woo (to (South Korea) Gwangju FC)
4	DF	JPN	Takuya Sonoda (to (Japan) FC Imabari)
9	FW	PRK	An Byong-jun (to (South Korea) Suwon FC)
11	FW	JPN	Yusuke Minagawa (to (Japan) Sanfrecce Hiroshima, end of loan)
14	MF	JPN	Tatsuya Tanaka (to (Japan) Gamba Osaka)
15	DF	JPN	Takeshi Aoki (to (Japan) Nankatsu SC)
20	MF	JPN	Kazumasa Uesato (to (Japan) FC Ryukyu)
22	MF	JPN	Takuro Uehara (to (Japan) FC Imabari)
28	MF	JPN	Shota Hayashi (released)
30	GK	JPN	Akihiro Sato (to (Japan) Montedio Yamagata)
32	MF	JPN	Shusuke Yonehara (to (Japan) Matsumoto Yamaga)
37	MF	JPN	Yuki Ikeya (to (Japan) Kamatamare Sanuki)
45	DF	JPN	Tomonobu Yokoyama (to (Japan) Hokkaido Consadole Sapporo, end of loan)
50	MF	JPN	Koki Mizuno (to (Japan) Sagan Tosu, end of loan)
—	GK	JPN	Kota Nitadori (to (Japan) Fagiano Okayama, end of loan)
—	DF	JPN	Atsuro Tatara (released)
—	DF	JPN	Jang Sang-yun (released)

=== Kamatamare Sanuki ===
In: Note: Flags indicate national team as defined under FIFA eligibility rules; some limited exceptions apply. Players may hold more than one non-FIFA nationality.

No.	Pos.	Nation	Player
2	DF	JPN	Takaharu Nishino (from (Japan) Gamba Osaka)
3	DF	KOR	Bae Soo-yong (on loan from (Japan) Gamba Osaka)
8	MF	JPN	Yusuke Akahoshi (from (Japan) FC Tokushima)
16	GK	JPN	Kazuki Hattori (from (Japan) Kataller Toyama)
17	MF	JPN	Yuki Ikeya (from (Japan) Roasso Kumamoto)
20	DF	JPN	Kenta Yanagida (from (Japan) Nara Club)
25	MF	JPN	Kenta Sawada (promoted from youth ranks)
27	MF	JPN	Tomoya Hayashi (from (Japan) Kochi United SC, end of loan)
28	MF	JPN	Yuga Watanabe (from Meiji University)
29	MF	JPN	Ryo Nakamura (from Hannan University)
30	DF	JPN	Akira Takeuchi (from (Japan) Oita Trinita, previously on loan)
33	FW	JPN	Ryosuke Kijima (from (Japan) FC Maruyasu Okazaki)

Out: Note: Flags indicate national team as defined under FIFA eligibility rules; some limited exceptions apply. Players may hold more than one non-FIFA nationality.

No.	Pos.	Nation	Player
3	DF	JPN	Taiki Nakashima (to (Japan) Blaublitz Akita)
8	MF	JPN	Daigo Watanabe (retired)
17	MF	JPN	Takumi Sasaki (to (Japan) Vegalta Sendai, end of loan)
20	FW	JPN	Kazuki Hara (to (Japan) Roasso Kumamoto)
25	DF	JPN	Kazuya Okamura (to (Japan) Giravanz Kitakyushu)
28	MF	JPN	Hideo Tanaka (to (Japan) FC Maruyasu Okazaki, end of loan)
31	DF	BRA	Alex (released)
—	GK	KOR	Son Young-min (released)
—	DF	KOR	Park Chan-young (released)

=== Gainare Tottori ===
In: Note: Flags indicate national team as defined under FIFA eligibility rules; some limited exceptions apply. Players may hold more than one non-FIFA nationality.

No.	Pos.	Nation	Player
8	MF	JPN	Naoto Misawa (from (Japan) YSCC Yokohama)
20	DF	JPN	Tsubasa Oya (from (Japan) Tokushima Vortis)
29	GK	JPN	Akinori Ichikawa (on loan from (Japan) Yokohama FC)
—	DF	JPN	Takayuki Nakamura (from (Japan) FC Gifu)

Out: Note: Flags indicate national team as defined under FIFA eligibility rules; some limited exceptions apply. Players may hold more than one non-FIFA nationality.

No.	Pos.	Nation	Player
4	DF	JPN	Kentaro Kai (to (Japan) FC Gifu, end of loan)
9	FW	BRA	Leonardo (to (Japan) Albirex Niigata)
10	FW	JPN	Junya Kato (to (Japan) Thespakusatsu Gunma)
18	MF	JPN	Takuto Haraguchi (to (Japan) Veertien Mie)
20	MF	JPN	Sho Matsumoto (to (Japan) Kochi United SC)
24	DF	JPN	Hiroki Okuda (to (Japan) Tegevajaro Miyazaki)
25	MF	JPN	Daichi Soga (to (Japan) FC TIAMO Hirakata)
27	FW	JPN	Makito Hatanaka (to Albirex Niigata Singapore)
35	MF	JPN	Ren Sengoku (to (Japan) Tochigi SC, end of loan)
—	MF	JPN	Taisei Isoe (to (Japan) Matsue City FC, previously on loan)

=== Azul Claro Numazu ===
In: Note: Flags indicate national team as defined under FIFA eligibility rules; some limited exceptions apply. Players may hold more than one non-FIFA nationality.

No.	Pos.	Nation	Player
1	GK	PRK	Park Seung-ri (from (Japan) Thespakusatsu Gunma)
4	DF	JPN	Masato Fujiwara (on loan from (Japan) Thespakusatsu Gunma)
6	MF	JPN	Mitsuo Yamada (on loan from (Japan) Matsumoto Yamaga)
13	GK	JPN	Yuta Nagasawa (from Meiji University)
14	FW	JPN	Yuki Nakayama (from (Japan) Yokohama FC)
16	GK	JPN	Ayumi Niekawa (from (Japan) Jubilo Iwata, previously on loan)
17	FW	JPN	Yuma Kawamori (on loan from (Japan) Kagoshima United FC)
19	MF	JPN	Hikaru Shimazu (from Fuji University)
20	MF	JPN	Naoki Sato (from Sanno Institute of Education)
24	DF	JPN	Yuki Fukai (from Hokkaido University of Education)
34	MF	JPN	Kotaro Tokunaga (from Momoyama Gakuin University)
35	FW	JPN	Ryo Watanabe (from Sanno Institute of Management)
38	MF	JPN	Takumi Hama (from Niigata University of Management)

Out: Note: Flags indicate national team as defined under FIFA eligibility rules; some limited exceptions apply. Players may hold more than one non-FIFA nationality.

No.	Pos.	Nation	Player
1	GK	JPN	Kengo Fukudome (to Albirex Niigata Singapore)
6	MF	JPN	Yuta Kutsukake (retired)
8	MF	JPN	Keisuke Minegishi (retired)
10	FW	JPN	Shota Aoki (to (Japan) Thespakusatsu Gunma)
17	MF	JPN	Kazuki Ota (retired)
19	FW	JPN	Masatoshi Ishida (to (Japan) Kyoto Sanga, end of loan)
24	DF	JPN	Kazuya Sunamori (to (Japan) Kagoshima United FC)
27	DF	JPN	Masanobu Matsufuji (retired)
29	FW	JPN	Junki Hata (to (Japan) V-Varen Nagasaki, end of loan)
31	GK	JPN	Shogo Onishi (to (Japan) Kagoshima United FC)
47	MF	JPN	Yasuhito Tomita (retired)

=== Thespakusatsu Gunma ===
In: Note: Flags indicate national team as defined under FIFA eligibility rules; some limited exceptions apply. Players may hold more than one non-FIFA nationality.

No.	Pos.	Nation	Player
1	GK	JPN	Yuto Koizumi (from (Japan) Mito Hollyhock)
3	MF	JPN	Junya Suzuki (from Rissho University)
4	DF	JPN	Daihachi Okamura (from Rissho University)
5	DF	JPN	Tsubasa Aoki (on loan from (Japan) FC Gifu)
6	MF	JPN	Sho Sato (from (Japan) Mito Hollyhock)
7	FW	JPN	Junya Kato (from (Japan) Gainare Tottori)
8	MF	JPN	Ryo Kubota (from (Japan) Ventforet Kofu)
10	FW	JPN	Shota Aoki (from (Japan) Azul Claro Numazu)
11	FW	JPN	Masao Tsuji (from (Japan) YSCC Yokohama)
14	MF	JPN	Toshiya Tanaka (from (Japan) Kashima Antlers)
16	MF	JPN	Kento Kato (from (Japan) Fagiano Okayama)
17	FW	JPN	Yuya Takazawa (from Ryutsu Keizai University)
18	FW	JPN	Shunta Nakamura (on loan from (Japan) Montedio Yamagata)
19	DF	JPN	Masaya Yoshida (from Tokyo University of Agriculture)
21	GK	KOR	Kim Chol-ho (on loan from (Japan) Kyoto Sanga)
22	DF	JPN	Nanasei Iino (from Kokushikan University)
23	GK	JPN	Shun Yoshida (from Hosei University)
24	DF	JPN	Yuya Mitsunaga (from (Japan) Fujieda MYFC)
28	DF	JPN	Shunsuke Fukuda (from (Japan) Giravanz Kitakyushu)
30	MF	JPN	Yuya Himeno (on loan from (Japan) Oita Trinita)
32	DF	JPN	Kodai Watanabe (on loan from (Japan) Renofa Yamaguchi)

Out: Note: Flags indicate national team as defined under FIFA eligibility rules; some limited exceptions apply. Players may hold more than one non-FIFA nationality.

No.	Pos.	Nation	Player
1	GK	JPN	Satoshi Tokizawa (to (Japan) FC Maruyasu Okazaki)
3	DF	JPN	Yusuke Kawagishi (retired)
4	DF	JPN	Shusuke Tsubouchi (retired)
5	DF	JPN	Takumi Abe (to (Japan) SC Sagamihara)
6	MF	JPN	Tatsuki Kobayashi (retired)
7	FW	JPN	Shunta Takahashi (to (Japan) Kataller Toyama)
8	MF	JPN	Koki Kazama (to (Japan) Montedio Yamagata, end of loan)
10	FW	JPN	Ryuichi Hirashige (retired)
11	MF	JPN	Yuki Okaniwa (to (Japan) Tokyo United FC)
14	MF	JPN	Naoya Yoshida (to (Japan) Iwate Grulla Morioka)
16	DF	JPN	Keita Ichikawa (to (Japan) FC TIAMO Hirakata)
17	MF	JPN	Takafumi Suzuki (retired)
18	FW	JPN	Yosuke Komuta (to (Japan) Fukushima United FC)
21	GK	JPN	Shuhei Matsubara (to (Japan) Shonan Bellmare)
24	MF	JPN	Shunta Shimura (released)
25	FW	JPN	Ayumu Nagato (to (Japan) Montedio Yamagata, end of loan)
27	FW	JPN	Koki Oshima (to (Japan) Tochigi SC, end of loan)
28	DF	JPN	Takumi Hasegawa (to (Japan) Albirex Niigata, end of loan)
29	DF	JPN	Kenta Hoshihara (to (Japan) Matsumoto Yamaga, end of loan)
30	MF	JPN	Yuki Matsushita (to (Japan) Tochigi City FC)
33	MF	JPN	Teppei Usui (to (Japan) V-Varen Nagasaki, end of loan)
39	FW	JPN	Tetsuya Okubo (released)
40	DF	JPN	Tatsushi Koyanagi (to (Japan) Zweigen Kanazawa, end of loan)
—	GK	PRK	Park Seung-ri (to (Japan) Azul Claro Numazu)
—	DF	JPN	Yuto Ichiyanagi (released)
—	DF	JPN	Masato Fujiwara (on loan to (Japan) Azul Claro Numazu)
—	DF	JPN	Toshiki Nakamura (to (Japan) Suzuka Unlimited FC, previously on loan)
—	FW	JPN	Masato Yamazaki (to (Japan) Zweigen Kanazawa, end of loan)

=== Blaublitz Akita ===
In: Note: Flags indicate national team as defined under FIFA eligibility rules; some limited exceptions apply. Players may hold more than one non-FIFA nationality.

No.	Pos.	Nation	Player
1	GK	JPN	Yasuhiro Watanabe (from (Japan) Albirex Niigata)
3	DF	JPN	Taiki Nakashima (from (Japan) Kamatamare Sanuki)
4	MF	JPN	Taiju Watanabe (from Osaka Sangyo University)
8	FW	JPN	Masashi Wada (on loan from (Japan) Yokohama F. Marinos)
13	FW	JPN	Yohei Hayashi (from (Japan) Oita Trinita)
14	MF	JPN	Kenta Hori (on loan from (Japan) Yokohama F. Marinos)
16	FW	JPN	Takumu Fujinuma (on loan from (Japan) Omiya Ardija)
18	FW	JPN	Kenji Kitawaki (from (Japan) YSCC Yokohama)
22	MF	JPN	Masaki Okino (from (Japan) Cerezo Osaka)
23	GK	JPN	Daiki Koike (from Toyo University)
25	FW	JPN	Daisuke Kitahara (from (Japan) YSCC Yokohama)
26	MF	JPN	Takuya Kakine (from (Japan) Fujieda MYFC)
27	FW	JPN	Kiyoshiro Tsuboi (on loan from (Japan) Tokushima Vortis)
31	DF	JPN	Yudai Tanaka (from (Japan) Hokkaido Consadole Sapporo)
39	MF	JPN	Hiroki Kotani (from (Japan) Iwate Grulla Morioka)

Out: Note: Flags indicate national team as defined under FIFA eligibility rules; some limited exceptions apply. Players may hold more than one non-FIFA nationality.

No.	Pos.	Nation	Player
—	GK	JPN	Fumiya Oishi (released)
1	GK	JPN	Keiki Shimizu (to (Japan) Omiya Ardija, end of loan)
3	DF	JPN	Shuhei Hotta (to (Japan) Ehime FC, end of loan)
4	DF	JPN	Shuhei Fukai (to (Japan) Iwate Grulla Morioka)
10	MF	JPN	Keita Hidaka (to (Japan) Vanraure Hachinohe)
11	FW	JPN	Yoshihiro Fujita (to (Japan) Tochigi City FC)
13	MF	JPN	Naoto Hiraishi (to (Japan) SC Sagamihara)
14	MF	JPN	Itsuki Yamada (retired)
16	FW	JPN	Masaya Yuma (to (Japan) Nara Club)
19	FW	JPN	Tsubasa Yoshihira (to (Japan) Oita Trinita, end of loan)
22	DF	JPN	Jun Sonoda (retired)
29	FW	JPN	Tomohiro Tanaka (to (Japan) Kataller Toyama)
30	MF	JPN	Ryo Toyama (to (Japan) Mito HollyHock, end of loan)
—	MF	JPN	Keisuke Ono (on loan to (Japan) Hirosaki Blancdieu FC)

=== SC Sagamihara ===
In: Note: Flags indicate national team as defined under FIFA eligibility rules; some limited exceptions apply. Players may hold more than one non-FIFA nationality.

No.	Pos.	Nation	Player
2	DF	BRA	Lucas (from (Brazil) Veranópolis)
3	DF	JPN	Seitaro Tomisawa (from (Japan) Albirex Niigata)
6	MF	JPN	Junichi Inamoto (from (Japan) Hokkaido Consadole Sapporo)
7	MF	JPN	Kanta Kajiyama (from (Japan) Nagoya Grampus, previously on loan)
8	MF	BRA	Milton (from (Brazil) Olímpia)
10	MF	BRA	Geovani (from (Brazil) Santa Cruz)
13	MF	JPN	Naoto Hiraishi (from (Japan) Blaublitz Akita)
14	MF	JPN	Chie Edoojon Kawakami (on loan from (Japan) Tokushima Vortis)
16	GK	JPN	Motoaki Miura (from Takushoku University)
18	FW	JPN	Jonathan Mitsuoka (on loan from (Japan) Nagoya Grampus)
19	MF	JPN	Toshiya Sueyoshi (from (Japan) Fagiano Okayama)
21	GK	JPN	Suguru Asanuma (from (Japan) YSCC Yokohama)
23	DF	JPN	Seiji Kawakami (on loan from (Japan) Tochigi SC)
24	DF	JPN	Takumi Abe (from (Japan) Thespakusatsu Gunma)
25	DF	JPN	Ryo Odajima (from Toin University of Yokohama)
26	MF	JPN	Shuto Kanmera (from Niigata University of Health and Welfare)
27	FW	JPN	Tsugutoshi Oishi (from (Japan) Renofa Yamaguchi)
39	MF	JPN	Daisuke Ito (from (Japan) Fagiano Okayama)

Out: Note: Flags indicate national team as defined under FIFA eligibility rules; some limited exceptions apply. Players may hold more than one non-FIFA nationality.

No.	Pos.	Nation	Player
1	GK	JPN	Yoshikatsu Kawaguchi (retired)
3	DF	JPN	Yusei Kudo (retired)
4	DF	JPN	Yu Yonehara (from (Japan) Iwate Grulla Morioka)
7	MF	JPN	Yuki Kitai (released)
8	MF	JPN	Tatsuya Yazawa (to (Japan) Fujieda MYFC)
10	MF	JPN	Takuro Kikuoka (to (Japan) ReinMeer Aomori)
13	FW	JPN	Yuichi Kubo (to (Japan) Arterivo Wakayama)
14	FW	BRA	Tiquinho (released)
15	MF	JPN	Shinji Tsujio (retired)
17	DF	JPN	Sunao Hozaki (released)
18	MF	JPN	Sho Naruoka (to (Japan) Fujieda MYFC)
20	DF	JPN	Natsuki Mugikura (from (Japan) Iwate Grulla Morioka)
21	MF	JPN	Yudai Tokunaga (released)
23	GK	JPN	Takuya Ohata (to (Japan) Fujieda MYFC)
25	MF	JPN	Tomoya Takahata (to (Japan) Matsue City FC)
37	FW	JPN	Shohei Otsuka (released)
39	FW	JPN	Kohei Matsumoto (to (Japan) Nagoya Grampus, end of loan)
50	MF	BRA	Toró (released)
—	DF	JPN	Takaaki Kinoshita (from (Japan) Iwate Grulla Morioka)
—	FW	JPN	Kohei Matsumoto (to (Japan) Nagoya Grampus, end of loan)

=== Nagano Parceiro ===
In: Note: Flags indicate national team as defined under FIFA eligibility rules; some limited exceptions apply. Players may hold more than one non-FIFA nationality.

No.	Pos.	Nation	Player
5	DF	JPN	Jurato Ikeda (on loan from (Japan) Ehime FC)
7	MF	JPN	Naoya Senoo (from (Japan) Gamba Osaka)
11	MF	JPN	Yu Kimura (from (Japan) V-Varen Nagasaki)
13	DF	JPN	Shinji Yamaguchi (from (Japan) Vissel Kobe)
20	DF	JPN	Yuzuru Yoshimura (from Doshisha University)
23	FW	JPN	Yuto Oshiro (from Chukyo University)
28	DF	JPN	Keita Irumagawa (on loan from (Japan) Ventforet Kofu)
29	MF	JPN	Riku Yamada (on loan from (Japan) Omiya Ardija)
31	GK	JPN	Ryu Nugraha (from Ueda Chikuma High School)

Out: Note: Flags indicate national team as defined under FIFA eligibility rules; some limited exceptions apply. Players may hold more than one non-FIFA nationality.

No.	Pos.	Nation	Player
1	GK	JPN	Kengo Tanaka (to (Japan) Matsumoto Yamaga)
5	DF	JPN	Masahiro Teraoka (to (Japan) Giravanz Kitakyushu)
7	FW	JPN	Yuki Sato (to (Japan) FC Kariya)
8	MF	JPN	Shuto Kawai (to (Japan) FC Ryukyu)
11	FW	JPN	Hideya Okamoto (to (Japan) FC TIAMO Hirakata)
13	FW	JPN	Yoshinori Katsumata (to (Japan) Ococias Kyoto AC)
20	DF	JPN	Yuta Tsunami (to (Japan) Nara Club)
28	FW	JPN	Ryo Matsumura (to (Thailand) Rayong FC)
29	MF	JPN	Yuto Maeda (to (Japan) FC Osaka)
30	FW	JPN	Hiroki Bandai (to (Japan) ReinMeer Aomori)

=== Kataller Toyama ===
In: Note: Flags indicate national team as defined under FIFA eligibility rules; some limited exceptions apply. Players may hold more than one non-FIFA nationality.

No.	Pos.	Nation	Player
1	GK	JPN	Tetsuya Enomoto (from (Japan) Urawa Red Diamonds)
4	DF	JPN	Issei Tone (from Tokai Gakuen University)
5	DF	JPN	Junya Imase (from (Japan) Mito HollyHock, previously on loan)
6	MF	JPN	Teppei Usui (on loan from (Japan) V-Varen Nagasaki)
8	FW	JPN	Shunta Takahashi (from (Japan) Thespakusatsu Gunma)
14	MF	JPN	Tomoyuki Shiraishi (from (Japan) Iwate Grulla Morioka)
16	DF	JPN	Danto Sugiyama (on loan from (Japan) JEF United Chiba)
20	MF	JPN	Sho Hanai (from (Japan) Giravanz Kitakyushu)
21	GK	JPN	Gakuji Ota (from (Japan) Tokyo Verdy, previously on loan)
26	MF	JPN	Junki Mawatari (from (Japan) Ococias Kyoto AC, end of loan)
27	FW	JPN	Hayato Otani (from Kanazawa Gakuin University)
29	FW	JPN	Tomohiro Tanaka (from (Japan) Blaublitz Akita)
31	GK	JPN	Kazuki Saito (from Osaka Gakuin University)

Out: Note: Flags indicate national team as defined under FIFA eligibility rules; some limited exceptions apply. Players may hold more than one non-FIFA nationality.

No.	Pos.	Nation	Player
—	GK	JPN	Kazuki Hattori (to (Japan) Kamatamare Sanuki)
1	GK	JPN	Kengo Nagai (to (Japan) Matsumoto Yamaga, end of loan)
4	DF	JPN	Shuma Kusumoto (to (Japan) Toho Titanium SC)
6	MF	JPN	Yuto Sashinami (to (Japan) Vegalta Sendai, end of loan)
14	MF	JPN	Chie Edoojon Kawakami (to (Japan) Tokushima Vortis, end of loan)
16	DF	JPN	Kyohei Yumisaki (released)
18	FW	JPN	Ryo Takiya (on loan to (Japan) ReinMeer Aomori)
20	DF	JPN	Seiji Shindo (to (Japan) Veertien Mie)
29	FW	JPN	Masakazu Yoshioka (to (Japan) V-Varen Nagasaki, end of loan)
39	DF	JPN	Kazuki Sato (to (Japan) Vanraure Hachinohe)
41	MF	JPN	Yu Kimura (to (Japan) V-Varen Nagasaki, end of loan)
—	DF	JPN	Daniel Lewis Matsuzawa (released)
—	FW	JPN	Kosuke Nishi (released)

=== Fukushima United FC ===
In: Note: Flags indicate national team as defined under FIFA eligibility rules; some limited exceptions apply. Players may hold more than one non-FIFA nationality.

No.	Pos.	Nation	Player
11	MF	JPN	Kenta Kawanaka (from (Austria) SV Horn)
13	DF	JPN	Asahi Ishiwata (from Sanno University)
17	MF	JPN	Hiroto Morooka (from Kokushikan University)
18	FW	JPN	Yosuke Komuta (from (Japan) Thespakusatsu Gunma)
19	DF	JPN	Makoto Kawanishi (from Kanagawa University)
21	GK	KOR	Lee Yun-Oh (on loan from (Japan) Vegalta Sendai)
23	MF	JPN	Ryosuke Tamura (from (Japan) Kyoto Sanga)
29	MF	JPN	Hiroshi Yoshinaga (from Nihon University)
31	DF	JPN	Junya Higashi (from (Japan) Vissel Kobe, previously on loan)
39	FW	JPN	Hiroto Yukie (from Rissho University)

Out: Note: Flags indicate national team as defined under FIFA eligibility rules; some limited exceptions apply. Players may hold more than one non-FIFA nationality.

No.	Pos.	Nation	Player
1	GK	JPN	Go Ito (to (Japan) Tochigi City FC)
6	MF	JPN	Takashi Kamoshida (retired)
7	DF	JPN	Hiroto Mogi (retired)
8	MF	JPN	Kazuto Ishido (retired)
11	MF	JPN	Shota Tamura (to (Japan) Roasso Kumamoto)
13	FW	JPN	Shuhei Mitsuhashi (released)
15	DF	JPN	Shuto Hira (retired)
17	MF	JPN	Naoki Maeda (to (Japan) Shonan Bellmare, end of loan)
28	GK	JPN	Ryo Ishii (to (Japan) Mito HollyHock, end of loan)
—	DF	BRA	Santos (released)
—	MF	JPN	Yuki Hashimoto (released)
—	MF	JPN	Shota Hasanuma (to (Japan) Veertien Mie, previously on loan)
—	MF	JPN	Shohei Kawakami (released)
—	FW	JPN	Hibiki Wada (to (Japan) Shonan Bellmare, end of loan)

=== Iwate Grulla Morioka ===
In: Note: Flags indicate national team as defined under FIFA eligibility rules; some limited exceptions apply. Players may hold more than one non-FIFA nationality.

No.	Pos.	Nation	Player
2	DF	JPN	Takaaki Kinoshita (from (Japan) SC Sagamihara)
4	DF	JPN	Yu Yonehara (from (Japan) SC Sagamihara)
5	MF	JPN	Keita Ishii (from (Japan) Yokohama FC)
6	MF	JPN	Kazuto Kushida (from (Australia) Wollongong United)
7	DF	JPN	Natsuki Mugikura (from (Japan) SC Sagamihara)
9	FW	JPN	Shota Kikuchi (from (Japan) Iwaki FC)
11	FW	JPN	Kento Yabuuchi (on loan from (Japan) FC Gifu)
16	FW	JPN	Genki Hirakawa (from Nippon Sport Science University)
17	MF	JPN	Ryuji Hirota (from (Japan) Renofa Yamaguchi)
18	FW	JPN	Tsuyoshi Miyaichi (from (Japan) Shonan Bellmare, previously on loan)
19	MF	JPN	Naoya Yoshida (from (Japan) Thespakusatsu Gunma)
21	GK	JPN	Kotaro Iba (from (Japan) Montedio Yamagata)
22	DF	JPN	Shuhei Fukai (from (Japan) Blaublitz Akita)
25	MF	JPN	Atsuki Shimizu (promoted from youth ranks)

Out: Note: Flags indicate national team as defined under FIFA eligibility rules; some limited exceptions apply. Players may hold more than one non-FIFA nationality.

No.	Pos.	Nation	Player
2	DF	JPN	Kaito Kubo (retired)
4	DF	JPN	Tokio Hatamoto (retired)
5	DF	JPN	Katsuhisa Inamori (retired)
6	MF	JPN	Ryoichi Kawazu (to (Japan) Vanraure Hachinohe)
7	MF	JPN	Yoshihiro Masuko (to (Japan) Sperio Johuku)
9	FW	JPN	Kohei Takayanagi (retired)
10	MF	JPN	Kenichi Tanimura (retired)
11	FW	JPN	Kohei Imazeki (released)
15	MF	JPN	Kenta Anraku (retired)
16	DF	JPN	Shun Tanaka (retired)
17	DF	JPN	Sho Tanaka (to (Japan) Ococias Kyoto AC)
19	MF	JPN	Tomoyuki Shiraishi (to (Japan) Kataller Toyama)
26	MF	JPN	Riku Yamada (to (Japan) Omiya Ardija, end of loan)
29	FW	JPN	Takumu Fujinuma (to (Japan) Omiya Ardija, end of loan)
32	GK	JPN	Yuto Koizumi (to (Japan) Mito HollyHock, end of loan)
39	MF	JPN	Hiroki Kotani (to (Japan) Blaublitz Akita)

=== YSCC Yokohama ===
In: Note: Flags indicate national team as defined under FIFA eligibility rules; some limited exceptions apply. Players may hold more than one non-FIFA nationality.

No.	Pos.	Nation	Player
2	DF	KOR	Jung Han-cheol (on loan from (Japan) Machida Zelvia)
41	FW	JPN	Takamasa Abiko (from (Japan) Mito HollyHock)

Out: Note: Flags indicate national team as defined under FIFA eligibility rules; some limited exceptions apply. Players may hold more than one non-FIFA nationality.

No.	Pos.	Nation	Player
1	GK	JPN	Suguru Asanuma (to (Japan) SC Sagamihara)
6	MF	JPN	Hikaru Ozawa (retired)
10	FW	JPN	Masao Tsuji (to (Japan) Thespakusatsu Gunma)
11	FW	JPN	Kenji Kitawaki (to (Japan) Blaublitz Akita)
13	MF	JPN	Kyoga Nakamura (to Albirex Niigata Singapore)
14	MF	JPN	Kyosuke Goto (to (Japan) Ventforet Kofu)
23	MF	JPN	Naoto Misawa (to (Japan) Gainare Tottori)
32	FW	JPN	Daisuke Kitahara (to (Japan) Blaublitz Akita)

=== Fujieda MYFC ===
In: Note: Flags indicate national team as defined under FIFA eligibility rules; some limited exceptions apply. Players may hold more than one non-FIFA nationality.

No.	Pos.	Nation	Player
3	DF	JPN	Junya Suzuki (from (Germany) VfR Aalen)
6	DF	JPN	Michitaka Akimoto (from (Thailand) Thai Honda FC)
14	MF	JPN	Tatsuya Yazawa (from (Japan) SC Sagamihara)
19	MF	JPN	Sho Naruoka (from (Japan) SC Sagamihara)
20	FW	JPN	Yasuhito Morishima (from (Japan) Tochigi City FC)
21	GK	JPN	Takuya Ohata (from (Japan) SC Sagamihara)
22	DF	JPN	Nobuyuki Kawashima (from Osaka Kyoiku University)
23	MF	JPN	So Kataoka (on loan from (Japan) FC Imabari)
24	FW	JPN	Daisuke Ando (from (Germany) CfR Pforzheim)
25	DF	JPN	Taiga Harada (from Shizuoka Sangyo University)
26	DF	JPN	Hayato Nishinoue (from (Japan) FC Imabari)
28	DF	JPN	Koki Matsumura (from Osaka Kyoiku University)
29	DF	JPN	Kenta Hoshihara (from (Japan) Matsumoto Yamaga)
30	MF	JPN	Ryosuke Matsuoka (from (Japan) Montedio Yamagata)
31	GK	JPN	Yasutaka Jomori (from (Japan) FC Osaka)
32	DF	JPN	Shota Suzuki (from Tokyo Gakugei University)
33	MF	JPN	Naoto Ando (from (Japan) Giravanz Kitakyushu)

Out: Note: Flags indicate national team as defined under FIFA eligibility rules; some limited exceptions apply. Players may hold more than one non-FIFA nationality.

No.	Pos.	Nation	Player
3	DF	JPN	Yohei Nishimura (to (Japan) Nara Club)
6	MF	JPN	Ryosuke Kakigi (to (Japan) Ococias Kyoto AC)
14	MF	JPN	Takuya Kakine (to (Japan) Blaublitz Akita)
19	MF	JPN	Ryosuke Ochi (to (Japan) FC Ryukyu)
20	DF	JPN	Takaaki Kinoshita (to (Japan) Mito HollyHock, end of loan)
21	GK	JPN	Shun Sato (to (Japan) Suzuka Unlimited FC)
22	DF	JPN	Ryusei Saito (retired)
23	MF	JPN	Masanobu Komaki (to (Japan) Vanraure Hachinohe)
24	DF	JPN	Yuya Mitsunaga (to (Japan) Thespakusatsu Gunma)
25	DF	JPN	Seiji Kawakami (to (Japan) Tochigi SC, end of loan)
26	DF	JPN	Takahiro Urashima (to (Japan) MIO Biwako Shiga)
28	FW	JPN	Junki Endo (to (Japan) Suzuka Unlimited FC)
29	FW	JPN	Ryota Watanabe (released)
32	MF	JPN	Yuta Inagaki (to (Japan) MIO Biwako Shiga)
33	DF	PRK	Kim Song-gi (to (Japan) Tochigi City FC)
—	GK	JPN	Lee Che-gun (released)
—	DF	JPN	Masahiro Seki (released)

=== Giravanz Kitakyushu ===
In: Note: Flags indicate national team as defined under FIFA eligibility rules; some limited exceptions apply. Players may hold more than one non-FIFA nationality.

No.	Pos.	Nation	Player
2	DF	JPN	Hiroto Arai (from Meiji Gakuin University)
5	DF	JPN	Masahiro Teraoka (from (Japan) Nagano Parceiro)
6	DF	JPN	Kazuya Okamura (from (Japan) Kamatamare Sanuki)
9	FW	JPN	Akira Silvano Disarò (from Hosei University)
14	MF	JPN	Takayuki Arakaki (from Ryutsu Keizai University)
18	FW	JPN	Shuto Machino (on loan from (Japan) Yokohama F. Marinos)
20	DF	JPN	Takashi Kawano (from Kansai University)
24	DF	JPN	Jin Ikoma (on loan from (Japan) Yokohama F. Marinos)
25	MF	JPN	Shintaro Kokubu (on loan from (Japan) Oita Trinita)
26	DF	JPN	Taiki Uchikoshi (from Toin University of Yokohama)
27	GK	JPN	Yuya Tanaka (from Ichiritsu Funabashi High School)
—	GK	JPN	Daiki Kato (from Meiji University)

Out: Note: Flags indicate national team as defined under FIFA eligibility rules; some limited exceptions apply. Players may hold more than one non-FIFA nationality.

No.	Pos.	Nation	Player
1	GK	JPN	Norihiro Yamagishi (retired)
5	MF	JPN	Tatsuya Onodera (to (Japan) Tegevajaro Miyazaki)
8	MF	JPN	Naoto Ando (to (Japan) Fujieda MYFC)
9	FW	BRA	Davi (released)
20	MF	JPN	Sho Hanai (to (Japan) Kataller Toyama)
24	DF	JPN	Nobuyuki Kawashima (to (Japan) Fujieda MYFC)
25	FW	JPN	Hiroki Maeda (to (Japan) Verspah Oita)
28	DF	KOR	Bae Soo-yong (to (Japan) Gamba Osaka, end of loan)
28	DF	JPN	Shunsuke Fukuda (to (Japan) Thespakusatsu Gunma)
29	MF	JPN	Kengo Kotani (to (Japan) FC TIAMO Hirakata)
30	DF	JPN	Taisuke Muramatsu (retired)
31	FW	BRA	Ferro (released)
—	FW	KOR	Jeong Won-jae (to (South Korea) Kochi United SC, end of loan)
—	FW	JPN	Shoki Hirai (to (Japan) FC Maruyasu Okazaki, previously on loan)

=== Vanraure Hachinohe ===
In: Note: Flags indicate national team as defined under FIFA eligibility rules; some limited exceptions apply. Players may hold more than one non-FIFA nationality.

No.	Pos.	Nation	Player
6	MF	JPN	Ryoichi Kawazu (from (Japan) Iwate Grulla Morioka)
9	FW	JPN	Yosuke Kamigata (from (Japan) Tochigi SC)
15	MF	JPN	Keita Hidaka (from (Japan) Blaublitz Akita)
16	MF	JPN	Masanobu Komaki (from (Japan) Fujieda MYFC)
20	MF	JPN	Naoki Sanda (from (Japan) FC Imabari)
23	GK	JPN	Yuki Kaneko (from Sendai University)
25	MF	JPN	Taisuke Miyazaki (from (Japan) Tochigi SC)
33	DF	JPN	Kazuki Sato (from (Japan) Kataller Toyama)

Out: Note: Flags indicate national team as defined under FIFA eligibility rules; some limited exceptions apply. Players may hold more than one non-FIFA nationality.

No.	Pos.	Nation	Player
1	GK	JPN	Hiroki Harada (retired)
6	MF	JPN	Ryuya Motoda (to (Japan) Mito HollyHock, end of loan)
9	MF	JPN	Shogo Yoshikawa (released)
19	MF	JPN	Hiroki Nakada (released)
—	DF	KOR	Kang In-yeop (released)
—	DF	JPN	Wataru Sasaki (retired)
—	FW	JPN	Shotaro Inoue (released)
