= Football at the 2013 Summer Universiade =

Football at the XXVII Summer Universiade
- Venue: various
- Dates: July 5, 2013 – July 16, 2013
- Teams: 16 (men); 12 (women)

Football was contested at the 2013 Summer Universiade from July 5 to 16 in Kazan, Russia.

== Medal summary ==
=== Medal table ===
Rank	Nation	Gold	Silver	Bronze	Total
1	Great Britain (GBR)	1	1	0	2
2	France (FRA)	1	0	0	1
3	Mexico (MEX)	0	1	0	1
4	Brazil (BRA)	0	0	1	1
4	Japan (JPN)	0	0	1	1
Totals (5 entries)		2	2	2	6

=== Medal events ===
Event	Gold	Silver	Bronze
Men	France (FRA); Kevin Bacle; Hugo Baque; Maverick Barsotti; François Basset; Vincent Bezecourt; Maxime Brandy; Nicolas Dreyer; Damien Forestier; Theo Gazagnes; Morgan Jean-Pierre; Maxime Mantel; Matumona Matumona; Pierre Mazure; Mohand Merhouni; Luca Passoni; Valentin Sanson; Florian Sotoca; Olivier Vasseur; Anthony Villa; Pierre Coquelle	Great Britain (GBR); James Aldred; James Baldwin; James Belshaw; Alex Dyer; Luke Graham; Timothy Horn; Joe Lolley; Sammy MacVicar; Gavin Malin; Thomas McCready; Craig Moses; Kieran Murphy; George Nash; Marc Newsham; Jake Parrott; Nicholas Platt; Michael Rae; Simon Richman; George Williams; Jack Winter	Japan (JPN); Shuhei Akasaki; Jun Amano; Yusuke Chajima; Eisuke Fujishima; Hiroshi Futami; Jin Izumisawa; Kentaro Kakoi; Shunsuke Kikuchi; Kengo Kitazume; Ryo Kubota; Shintaro Kurumaya; Daiki Matsumoto; Yusuke Minagawa; Kazuki Nagasawa; Teruhito Nakagawa; Shun Obu; Daiki Ogawa; Hokuto Shimoda; Shogo Taniguchi; Masahiro Teraoka
Women	Great Britain (GBR); Ashley Baker; Danielle Carter-Loblack; Samantha Chappell; Isobel Christiansen; Naomi Cole; Bethany Donoghue; Mary Earps; Danielle Gibbons; Kerys Harrop; Michelle Hinnigan; Fran Kirby; Kasia Lipka; Grace McCatty; Billie Murphy; Jemma Rose; Katie Stanley; Demi Stokes; Courtney Sweetman-Kirk; Aileen Whelan; Victoria Williams	Mexico (MEX); Hayde Basáñez; Adriana Calzadillas; Miriam Castillo; Charlyn Corral; María Guadalupe Cruzaley; Cristina Ferral; Rosaura Gallegos; Karen García; Anjulí Ladrón de Guevara; Diana Anai López; Claudia Luna; Stephany Mayor; Liliana Mercado; Monica Monsivais; Ana Guadalupe Pontigo; Jessica Rodríguez; Daniela Solís; Manuela Solís; Melissa Sosa; Michelle Vargas	Brazil (BRA); Bárbara Barbosa; Aliane Barros; Scarlett Bernal; Mayara Bordin; Aline Calandrini; Giovanna Crivelari; Gabriela Demoner; Nathane Fabem; Kemily Matias; Camila Nobre; Giovana Oliveira; Luana Paixão; Karen Aline Peliçari; Paula Pires; Tuani Ramos; Flávia Riboura; Viviane Rodrigues; Patricia Sochor; Rafaela Travalão; Auina Viegas

== Men ==
Sixteen teams participated in the men's tournament.

=== Teams ===
Pool A

- Russia
- China
- Mexico
- Republic of Ireland

Pool B

- Japan
- Uruguay
- Ukraine
- Turkey

Pool C

- Great Britain
- Italy
- Malaysia
- ~~Algeria~~ (withdrew)

Pool D

- Brazil
- Canada
- France
- Peru

== Women ==
Twelve teams participated in the women's tournament.

=== Teams ===
Pool A

- Russia
- South Korea
- Chinese Taipei
- South Africa

Pool B

- China
- Canada
- Mexico
- Republic of Ireland

Pool C

- Japan
- Brazil
- Great Britain
- Estonia
