= 2019 Blaublitz Akita season =

Blaublitz Akita
2019 season
- Chairman: Kosuke Iwase
- Manager: Shuichi Mase
- Stadium: Soyu Stadium
- J3 League: 8th
- Emperor's Cup: First round
- Top goalscorer: Ryota Nakamura (11)
- Highest home attendance: 3,858
- Lowest home attendance: 736
- Average home league attendance: 1,576 (−44.5%)
Home colours	Away colours

2019 Blaublitz Akita season. The annual club slogan was "昇".

== Squad ==
As of 2019.

Note: Flags indicate national team as defined under FIFA eligibility rules; some limited exceptions apply. Players may hold more than one non-FIFA nationality.

No.	Pos.	Nation	Player
1	GK	JPN	Yasuhiro Watanabe
2	DF	JPN	Kei Omoto
3	DF	JPN	Taiki Nakashima
4	MF	JPN	Taiju Watanabe
5	DF	JPN	Kaito Chida
6	MF	JPN	Tomofumi Fujiyama
7	MF	JPN	Kyohei Maeyama
8	FW	JPN	Masashi Wada
9	FW	JPN	Ryota Nakamura
10	MF	JPN	Hiroyuki Furuta
11	MF	JPN	Ken Hisatomi
13	FW	JPN	Yohei Hayashi
14	MF	JPN	Kenta Hori
15	MF	JPN	Nao Eguchi

No.	Pos.	Nation	Player
16	FW	JPN	Takumu Fujinuma
17	DF	KOR	Han Ho-gang
18	FW	JPN	Kenji Kitawaki
20	MF	JPN	Takuma Aoshima
21	GK	JPN	Takuya Matsumoto
22	MF	JPN	Masaki Okino
23	GK	JPN	Daiki Koike
24	DF	JPN	Naoyuki Yamada (captain)
25	FW	JPN	Daisuke Kitahara
26	MF	JPN	Takuya Kakine
27	FW	JPN	Kiyoshiro Tsuboi
29	DF	JPN	Ryosuke Tada
31	DF	JPN	Yudai Tanaka
39	MF	JPN	Hiroki Kotani

== J3 League ==
Match	Date	Team	Score	Team	Venue	Attendance
1	2019.03.10	Thespakusatsu Gunma	2-2	Blaublitz Akita	Shoda Shoyu Stadium Gunma	3,691
2	2019.03.17	Kamatamare Sanuki	1-0	Blaublitz Akita	Pikara Stadium	2,145
3	2019.03.24	Grulla Morioka	3-1	Blaublitz Akita	Iwagin Stadium	2,084
4	2019.03.31	Blaublitz Akita	0-0	AC Nagano Parceiro	Yabase Stadium	3,858
5	2019.04.07	Blaublitz Akita	3-0	Cerezo Osaka U-23	Soyu Stadium	1,606
6	2019.04.14	SC Sagamihara	1-2	Blaublitz Akita	Sagamihara Gion Stadium	3,495
7	2019.04.27	Blaublitz Akita	0-0	Giravanz Kitakyushu	Soyu Stadium	835
8	2019.05.05	Gamba Osaka U-23	3-1	Blaublitz Akita	Panasonic Stadium Suita	1,732
9	2019.05.19	Blaublitz Akita	0-0	FC Tokyo U-23	Soyu Stadium	2,351
10	2019.06.02	Blaublitz Akita	0-2	Fukushima United	Soyu Stadium	955
11	2019.06.09	Kataller Toyama	1-2	Blaublitz Akita	Toyama Stadium	3,016
12	2019.06.16	Azul Claro Numazu	1-0	Blaublitz Akita	Ashitaka Park Stadium	2,397
13	2019.06.23	Blaublitz Akita	1-2	Roasso Kumamoto	Soyu Stadium	1,326
14	2019.06.30	Vanraure Hachinohe	1-2	Blaublitz Akita	Daihatsu Stadium	1,833
15	2019.07.07	Blaublitz Akita	0-0	Fujieda MYFC	Soyu Stadium	944
16	2019.07.14	YSCC Yokohama	1-2	Blaublitz Akita	NHK Spring Mitsuzawa Football Stadium	974
17	2019.07.20	Blaublitz Akita	0-2	Gainare Tottori	Soyu Stadium	1,357
18	2019.07.27	Blaublitz Akita	3-1	Grulla Morioka	Soyu Stadium	1,289
19	2019.08.04	Roasso Kumamoto	0-0	Blaublitz Akita	Egao Kenko Stadium	3,914
20	2019.08.11	Blaublitz Akita	1-1	Kataller Toyama	Soyu Stadium	1,445
21	2019.08.30	Blaublitz Akita	0-1	Azul Claro Numazu	Soyu Stadium	1,759
22	2019.09.07	Gainare Tottori	1-4	Blaublitz Akita	Tottori Bank Bird Stadium	2,378
23	2019.09.15	Blaublitz Akita	5-0	Kamatamare Sanuki	Soyu Stadium	1,277
24	2019.09.29	Blaublitz Akita	2-0	YSCC Yokohama	Soyu Stadium	2,925
25	2019.10.06	AC Nagano Parceiro	1-1	Blaublitz Akita	Nagano U Stadium	2,818
26	2019.10.12	Blaublitz Akita	2-2	Thespakusatsu Gunma	Soyu Stadium	736
27	2019.10.19	Fukushima United	1-2	Blaublitz Akita	J-Village Stadium	436
28	2019.10.27	Blaublitz Akita	0-1	Vanraure Hachinohe	Soyu Stadium	1,414
29	2019.11.03	Giravanz Kitakyushu	2-0	Blaublitz Akita	Mikuni World Stadium Kitakyushu	5,396
30	2019.11.06	FC Tokyo U-23	2-3	Blaublitz Akita	Yumenoshima Stadium	1,484
31	2019.11.17	Blaublitz Akita	3-0	Gamba Osaka U-23	Soyu Stadium	1,356
32	2019.11.23	Fujieda MYFC	1-0	Blaublitz Akita	Fujieda Soccer Stadium	1,420
33	2019.12.01	Cerezo Osaka U-23	1-3	Blaublitz Akita	Yanmar Stadium Nagai	1,052
34	2019.12.08	Blaublitz Akita	0-0	SC Sagamihara	Soyu Stadium	1,360

=== Standings ===
Pos	Team	Pld	W	D	L	GF	GA	GD	Pts	Promotion
1	Giravanz Kitakyushu (C, P)	34	19	9	6	51	27	+24	66	Promotion to 2020 J2 League (Note: Only teams that hold a J2 license are eligible for promotion.)
2	Thespakusatsu Gunma (P)	34	18	9	7	59	34	+25	63	Promotion to 2020 J2 League
3	Fujieda MYFC	34	18	9	7	42	31	+11	63	Ineligible for promotion
4	Kataller Toyama	34	16	10	8	54	31	+23	58	
5	Roasso Kumamoto	34	16	9	9	45	39	+6	57	
6	Cerezo Osaka U-23	34	16	4	14	49	56	−7	52	Ineligible for promotion
7	Gainare Tottori	34	14	8	12	49	59	−10	50	
8	Blaublitz Akita	34	13	10	11	45	35	+10	49	
9	Nagano Parceiro	34	13	10	11	35	34	+1	49	
10	Vanraure Hachinohe	34	14	6	14	49	42	+7	48	Ineligible for promotion
11	Fukushima United	34	13	4	17	45	53	−8	43	Ineligible for promotion
12	Azul Claro Numazu	34	11	6	17	35	43	−8	39	Ineligible for promotion
13	YSCC Yokohama	34	12	3	19	53	65	−12	39	Ineligible for promotion
14	Kamatamare Sanuki	34	10	9	15	33	49	−16	39	
15	SC Sagamihara	34	10	8	16	36	45	−9	38	Ineligible for promotion
16	FC Tokyo U-23	34	9	9	16	43	52	−9	36	Ineligible for promotion
17	Gamba Osaka U-23	34	9	8	17	54	55	−1	35	Ineligible for promotion
18	Iwate Grulla Morioka	34	7	5	22	36	63	−27	26	Ineligible for promotion

Source: 2019 MEIJI YASUDA J3 LEAGUE League table
Rules for classification: 1) Points; 2) Goal difference; 3) Goals scored; 4th) head-to-head results; 5th) disciplinary points; 6th) draw
(C) Champions; (P) Promoted

== Emperor's Cup ==
21 April 2019 Akita Prefecture Qualifying Final	Blaublitz Akita	4–0	Saruta Kōgyō S.C. [tl]	Soyu Stadium
13:00	Wada 8' own goal 35'; Nakashima 74', 80'	Report		Attendance: 528

26 May 2019 1	Blaublitz Akita	0–3	Meiji University	Soyu Stadium
13:00		Report	Morishita 30'; Ogashiwa 40'; Sato 79'	Attendance: 526; Referee: Daisuke Hatakeyama

== Other games ==
19 January 2019	Blaublitz Akita	2-1	Blaublitz Akita U-18	Space Project Dream Field
		Report; Report

30 January 2019	Blaublitz Akita	1-2	Jeonbuk Hyundai Motors FC	Ibusuki Iwasaki Hotel
	Nakamura	Report

3 February 2019	Kagoshima United FC	3-2	Blaublitz Akita	Kagoshima Prefectural Soccer Field A
10:00		Report

5 February 2019	Sanfrecce Hiroshima	2-1	Blaublitz Akita	Ibusuki Iwasaki Hotel
13:00		Report; Report	Tsuboi

6 February 2019	Blaublitz Akita	3-2	FC Seoul	Kokubu Sports Park
	Hori; Kitawaki; Fujinuma	Report

17 February 2019	Kataller Toyama	2-1	Blaublitz Akita
		Report

25 February 2019	FC Gifu	1-2	Blaublitz Akita	Gifu Nagaragawa Medow
		Report

25 March 2019	Blaublitz Akita	0-1	Grulla Morioka	Akita Prefecture Football Centre
		Report

21 April 2019	Blaublitz Akita	8-0	Japan Soccer College	Soyu Stadium
		Report

12 May 2019	Blaublitz Akita	3-0	Cobaltore Onagawa	TDK Akita General Sports Center
	Hayashix3	Report; Report

27 May 2019	Montedio Yamagata	2-3	Blaublitz Akita	Number 3 Sports Square
		Report; Report	Fujinuma; Hori x2

19 July 2019	Blaublitz Akita	3-0	Japan Soccer College	TDK Akita General Sports Center
		Report

31 July 2019	Blaublitz Akita	8-0	Akita Prefecture Senior Kokutai	Oga Marine Park
		Report

18 August 2019	Blaublitz Akita	0-1	Iwate University	TDK Akita General Sports Center
		Report

18 August 2019	Blaublitz Akita	3-2	ReinMeer Aomori	TDK Akita General Sports Center
		Report

22 September 2019	Blaublitz Akita	10-2	Niigata University of Health and Welfare	Oga Marine Park (39°53′4″N 139°51′23.8″E)
		Report

28 October 2019	Albirex Niigata	3-2	Blaublitz Akita	Niigata Seiro Sports Center
14:00		Report	Kitahara; Maeyama

== Gallery ==
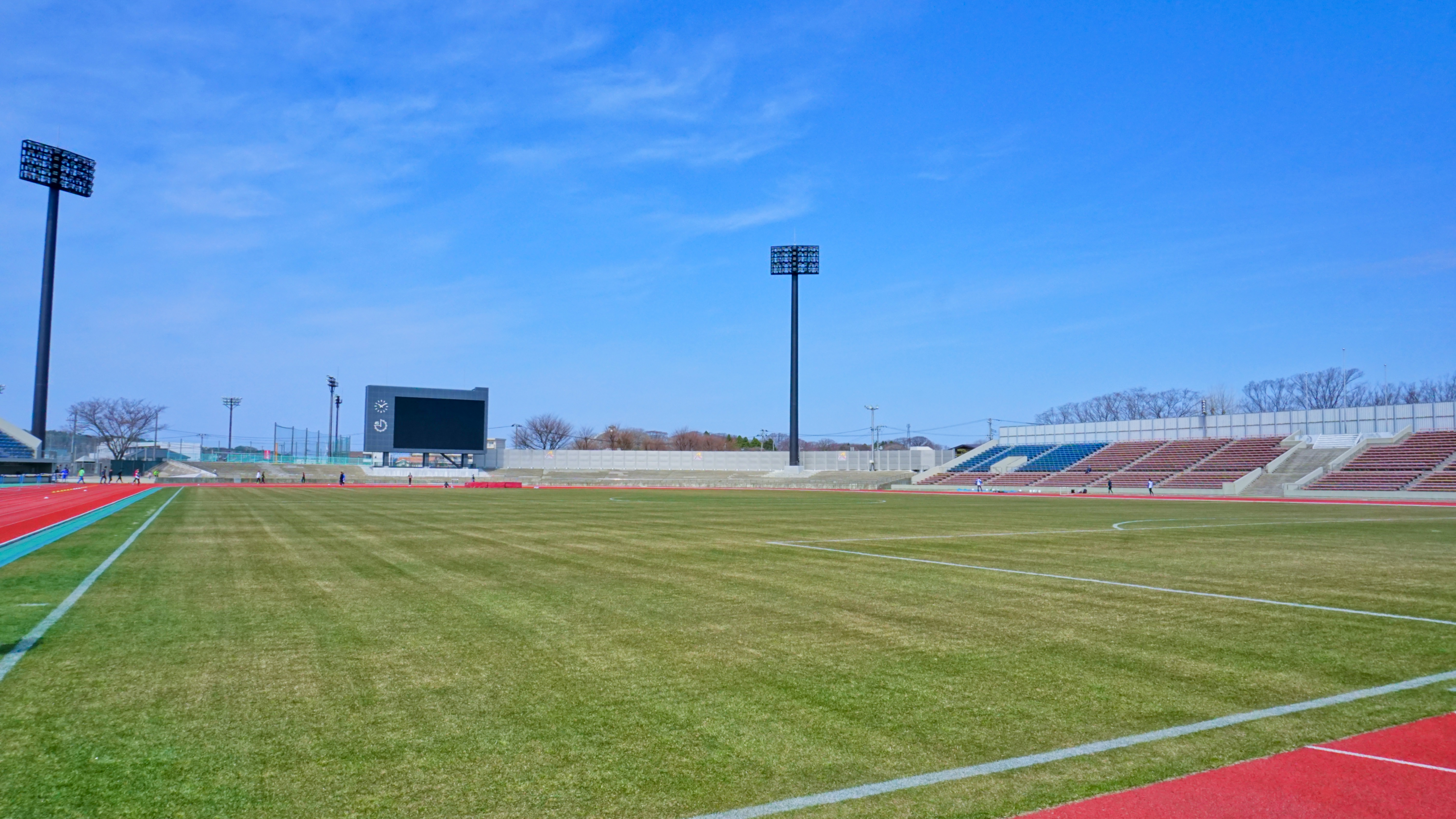
Soyu Stadium in 2019

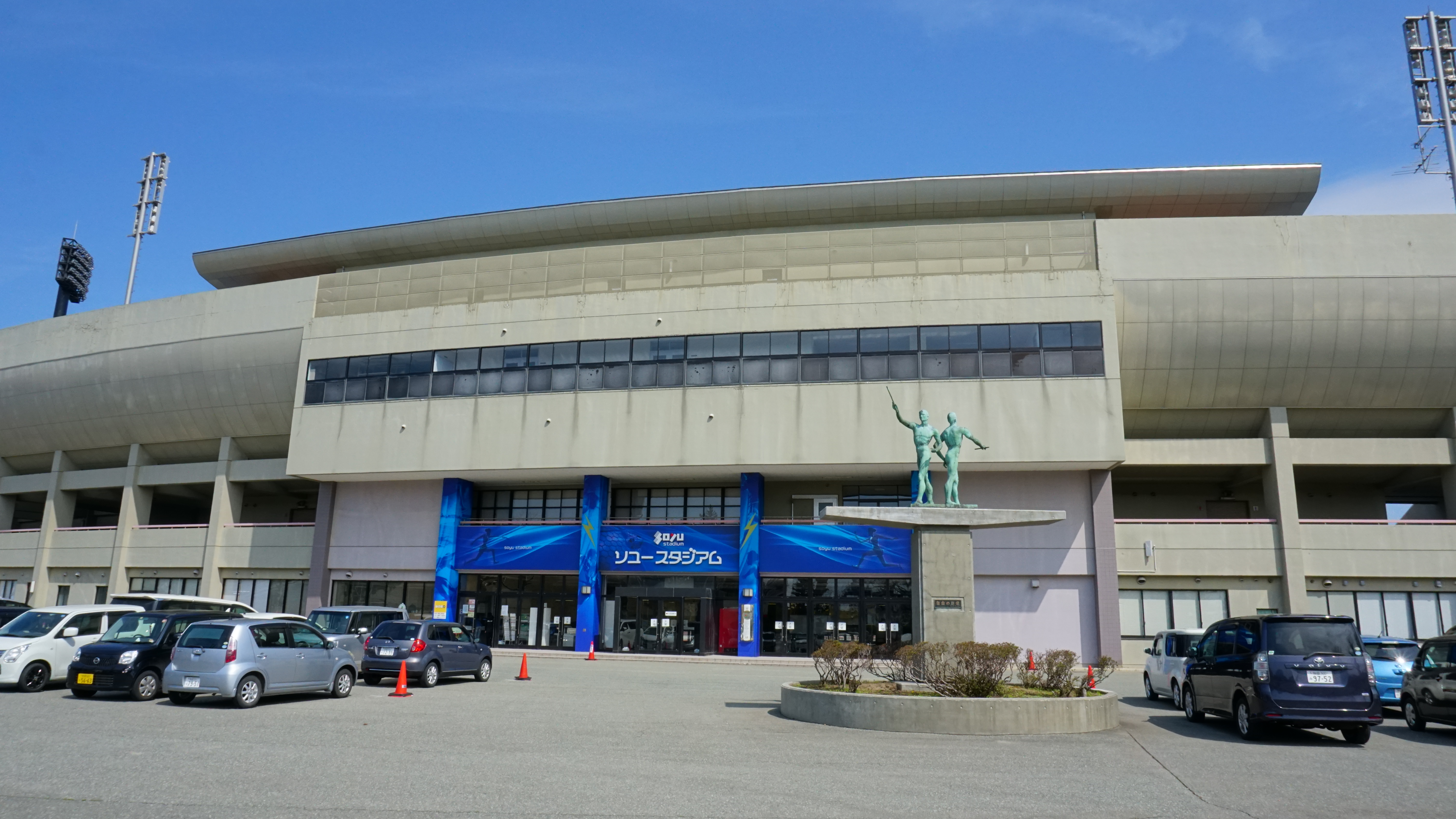
Soyu Stadium in 2019

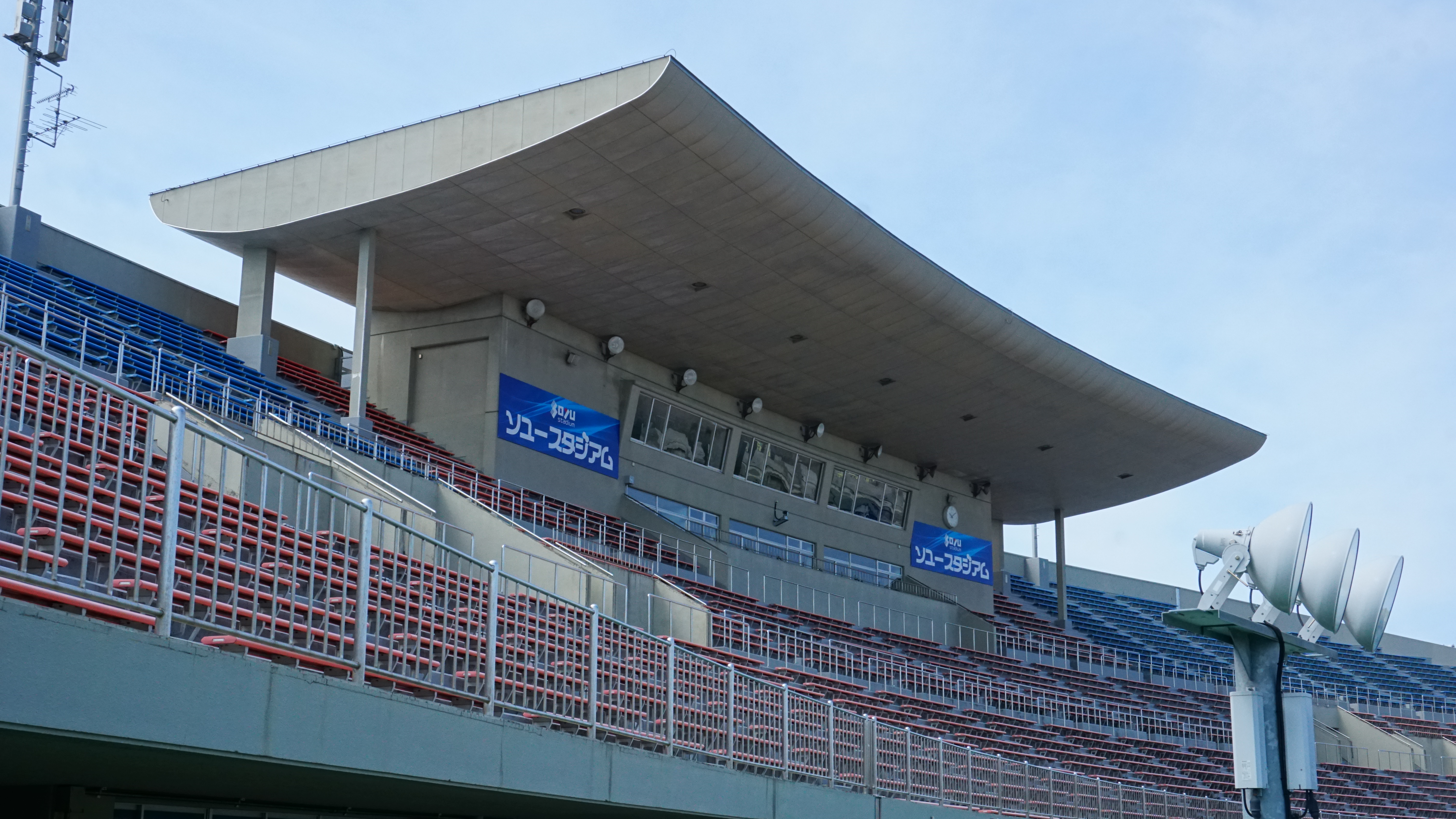
Soyu Stadium in 2019

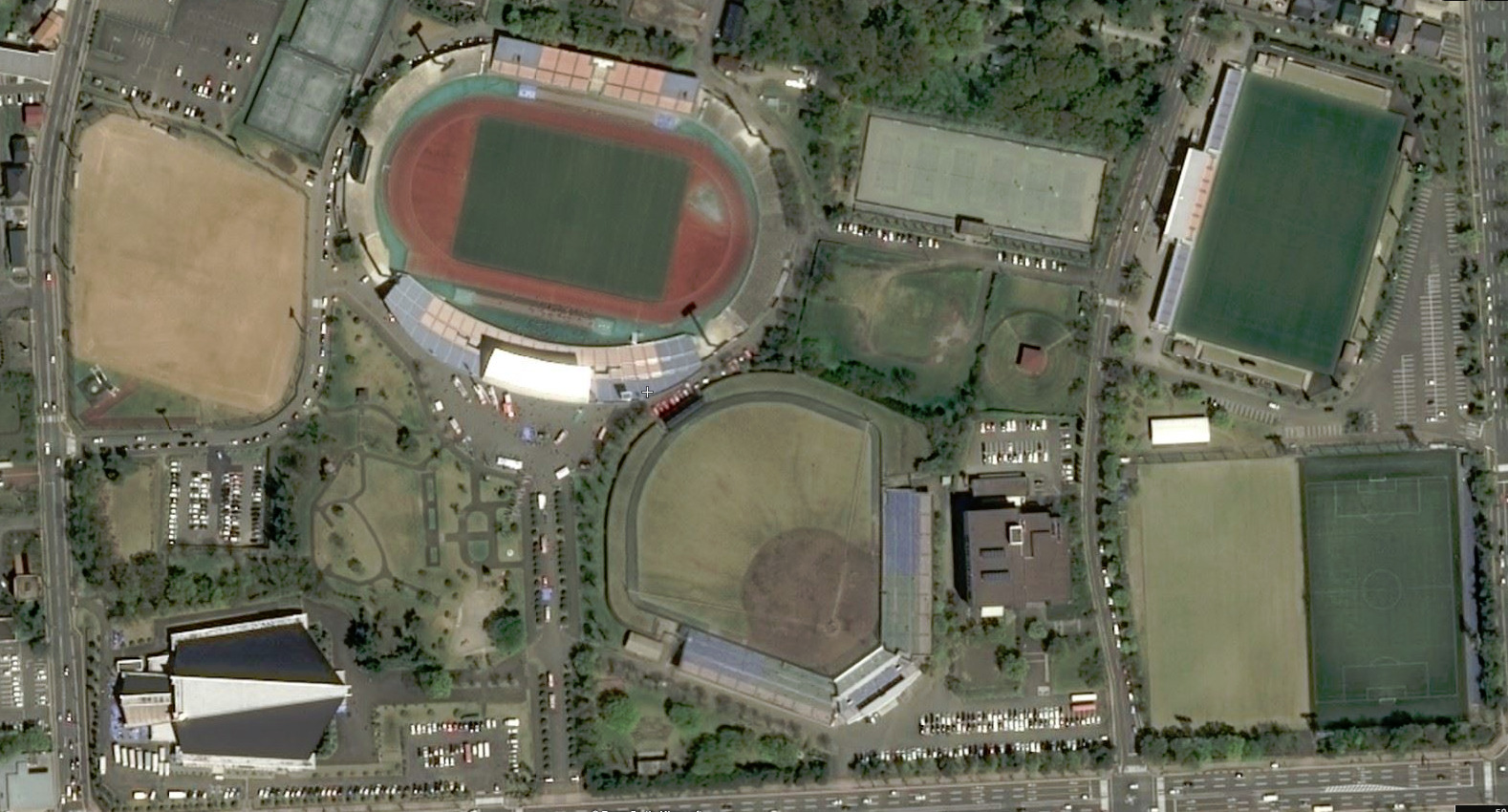
Yabase Sports Park on May 5, 2019

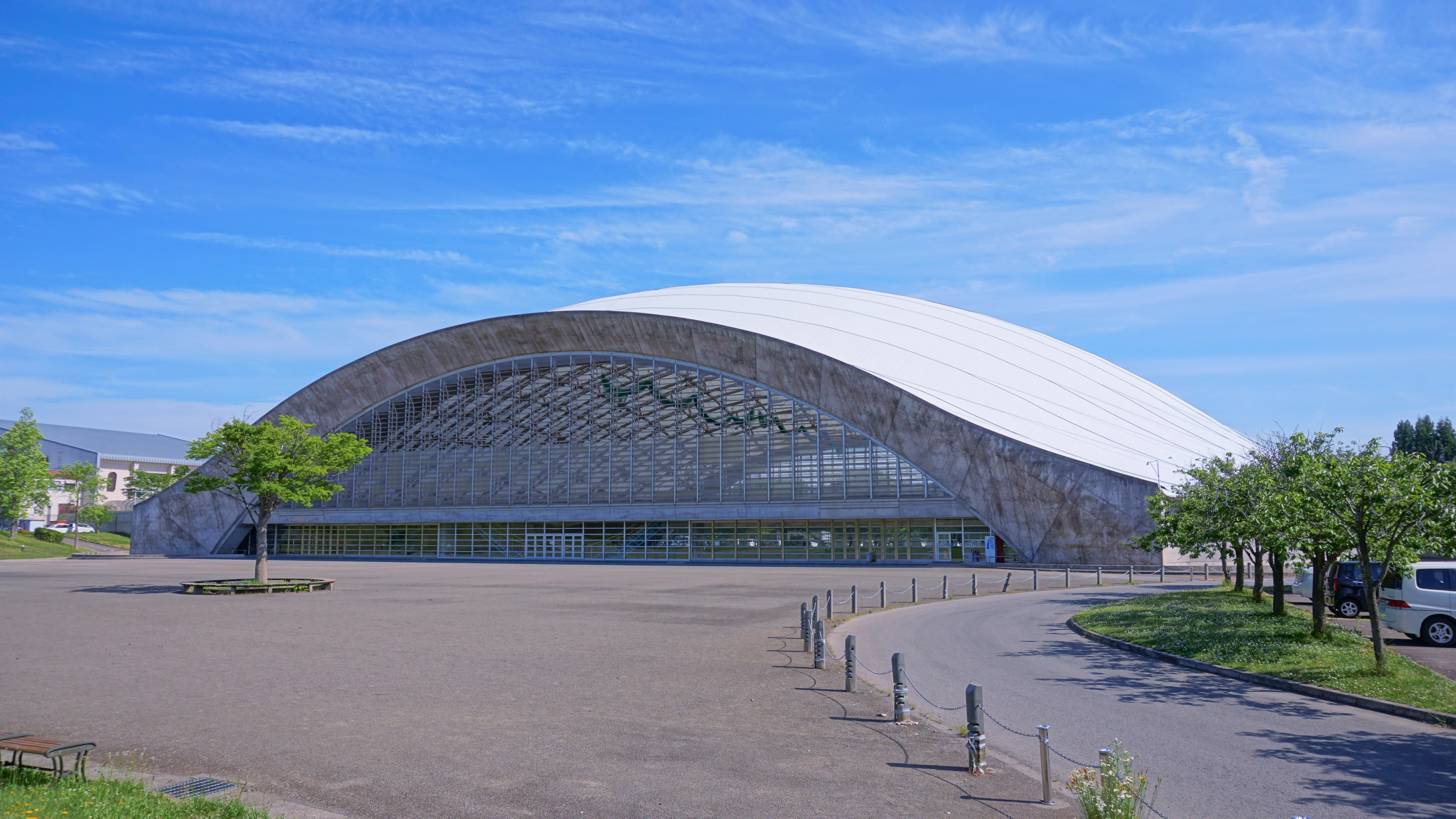
Sky Dome in 2019

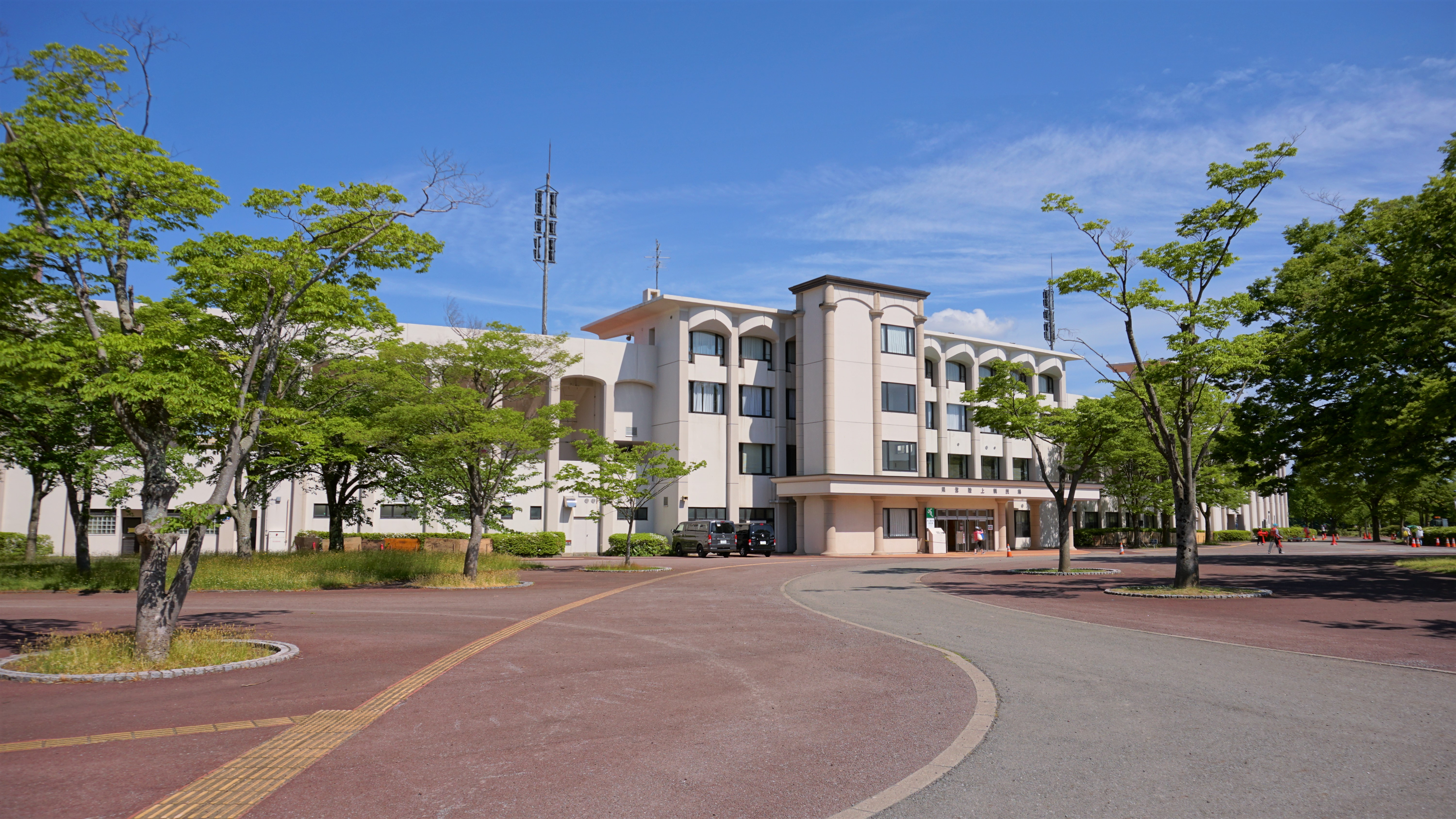
Akita Prefectural Central Park Athletic Stadium in 2019

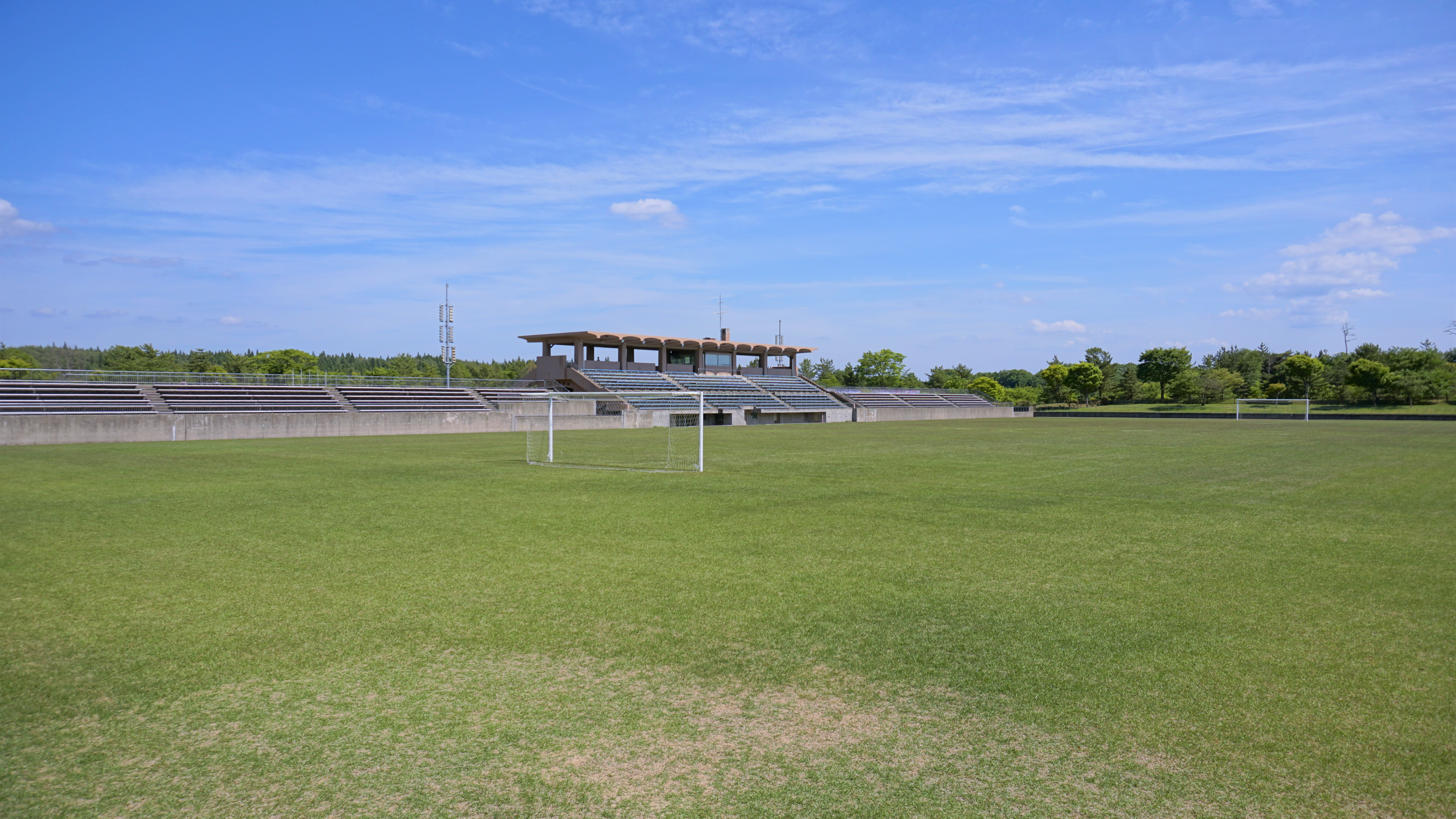
Akita Prefectural Central Park Football Stadium West Side Field in 2019

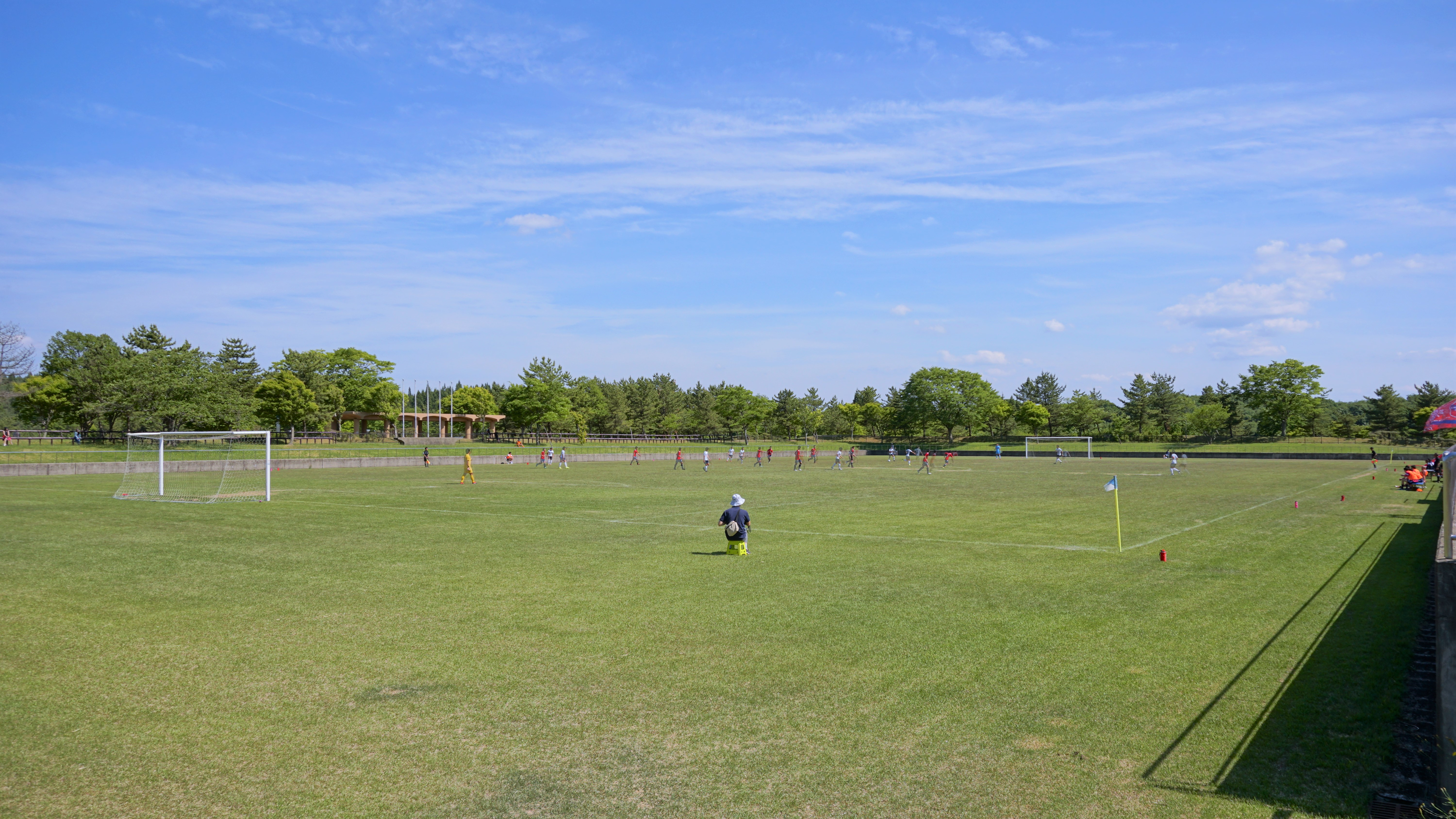
Akita Prefectural Central Park Football Stadium East Side Field in 2019

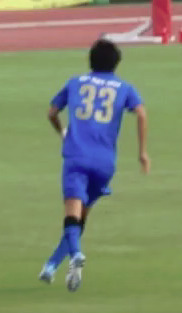
Hayashi
