= Yūto =

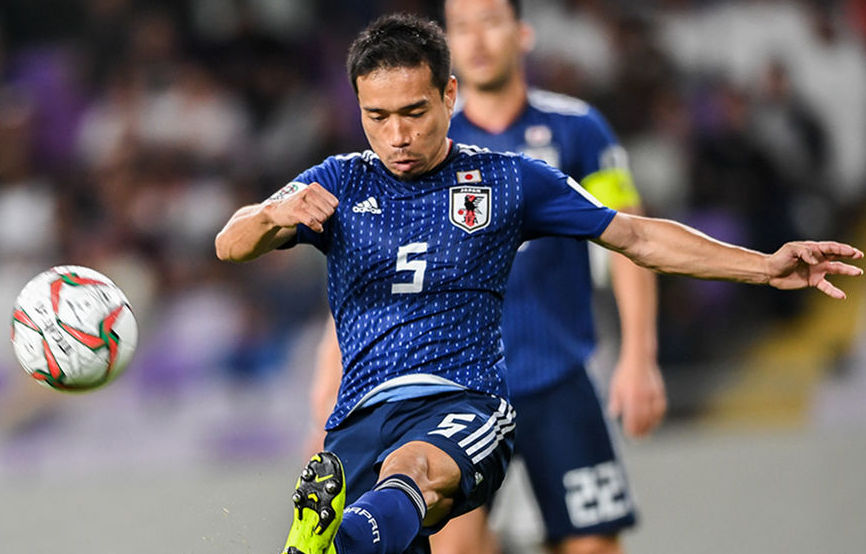
- Yuto Nagatomo, Japanese footballer
- Pronunciation: jɯɯto (IPA)
- Gender: Male

Origin
- Origin: Japanese
- Meaning: Different meanings depending on the kanji used

Other names
- Alternative spelling: Yuto (Kunrei-shiki) Yuto (Nihon-shiki) Yūto, Yuto, Yuuto (Hepburn)

Yūto, Yuto or Yuuto is a masculine Japanese given name.

== Written forms ==
Yūto can be written using different combinations of kanji characters. Here are some examples:

- 勇人, "courage, person"
- 悠人, "calm, person"
- 雄人, "male, person"
- 裕人, "rich, person"
- 優人, "gentleness, person"
- 祐人, "to help, person"
- 佑人, "to help, person"
- 勇斗, "courage, Big Dipper"
- 悠斗, "calm, Big Dipper"
- 雄斗, "male, Big Dipper"
- 裕斗, "rich, Big Dipper"
- 優斗, "gentleness, Big Dipper"
- 祐斗, "to help, Big Dipper"
- 佑斗, "to help, Big Dipper"
- 勇翔, "courage, to fly"
- 悠翔, "calm, to fly"
- 雄翔, "male, to fly"
- 優翔, "gentleness, to fly"

The name can also be written in hiragana ゆうと or katakana ユウト.

== Notable people with the name ==
- Yuto Adachi (安達 祐人; born 1998), Japanese rapper
- Yuto Hiratsuka (平塚 悠知; born 1996), Japanese footballer
- Yuto Horigome (footballer) (堀米 悠斗; born 1994), Japanese footballer
- Yuto Horigome (skateboarder) (堀米 雄斗; born 1999), Japanese skateboarder
- Yuto Iwasaki (岩崎 悠人; born 1998), Japanese football player
- Yuto Kazama (風間 勇刀; born 1970), Japanese voice actor
- Yuto Koizumi (小泉 勇人; born 1995), Japanese football player
- Yuto Maeda (前田 悠斗; born 1994), Japanese football player
- Yuto Misao (三竿 雄斗; born 1991), Japanese football player
- Yuto Miyazawa (宮澤 佑門; born 2000), Japanese rock guitarist
- Yuto Mizuguchi (水口 裕斗; born 1999), Japanese dancer and singer
- Yuto Mori (森 勇人; born 1995), Japanese football player
- Yuto Nagasaka (永坂 勇人; born 1994), Japanese football player
- Yuto Nagatomo (長友 佑都; born 1986), Japanese footballer
- Yuto Nakajima (中島 裕翔; born 1993), Japanese idol, singer and actor
- Yuto Nakamura (中村 祐人; born 1987), Japanese football player
- Yuto Nakano (中野 裕斗; born 1967), Japanese voice actor
- Yuto Nakayama (中山 雄登; born 1991), Japanese football player
- Yuto Ono (小野 悠斗; born 1991), Japanese football player
- Yuto Otsuka (大塚 裕土; born 1987), Japanese basketball player
- Yuto Otsuka (大塚 勇人; born 1990), Japanese basketball player
- Yuto Sashinami (差波 優人; born 1993), Japanese football player
- Yuto Shirai (白井 裕人; born 1988), Japanese football player
- Yuto Suzuki (鈴木 雄斗; born 1993), Japanese football player
- Yuto Takeoka (武岡 優斗; born 1986), Japanese football player
- Yuto Tonokawa (都乃河 勇人), Japanese scenario writer originally from Saitama, Japan
- Yuto Totsuka (戸塚 優斗; born 2001), Japanese snowboarder
- Yuto Tsukuda (附田 祐斗; born 1986), Japanese manga writer of Food Wars!: Shokugeki no Soma
- Yuto Uchida (内田 裕斗; born 1995), Japanese football player
- Yūto Uemura (上村 祐翔; born 1993), Japanese actor, voice actor and singer
- Yuto Yamada (山田 雄士; born 2000), Japanese footballer
- Yuto Yoshida (吉田 雄兎; 1913–2020), Japanese novelist and member of the Japanese Communist Party
- Yuto Yoshida (吉田 雄人; born 1975), Japanese politician, mayor of Yokosuka, Kanagawa

== Fictional characters ==
- Yuto (ユート), a character from Yu-Gi-Oh! Arc-V
- Yuto Akama (赤間 遊兔), a protagonist from Mikagura School Suite
- Yuto Amakawa (天河 優人), the protagonist of Omamori Himari
- Yuto Ayase (綾瀬 裕人), main character in Nogizaka Haruka no Himitsu
- Yuto Ijika ( 石鏡 いじか 悠 ゆう 斗 と), Character from Anime Twin Star Exorcists
- Yuto Ito (伊東 悠人), character from Real Girl
- Yuto Kamiki (神木 悠人), the protagonist of Iro ni Ide ni Keri Waga Koi wa
- Yuto Kamishiro (神代 優兎), character in Danganronpa zero
- Yuto Kannagi (神薙 勇刀), protagonist of Cross Edge
- Yuto Kiba (木場 祐斗), a protagonist of High School DxD
- Yuto Kigai (麒飼 遊人), character from X
- Yuto Miura (三浦 悠斗), character from W Juliet
- Yuto Mutsura (六連 佑斗), main character from Dracu-riot!
- Yuto Sakuraba (桜庭 雄斗), the protagonist of Tonari no Kashiwagi-san
- Yuto Sakurai (桜井 侑斗), character from Kamen Rider Den-O
- Yuto Shiba (司馬 優翔), character from Love and Lies
- Yuto Ukishima (浮島 悠斗), character from anime Ginga e Kickoff!!

== See also ==
- Yūtō, Shizuoka, a former town in Hamana District, Shizuoka Prefecture, Japan
