= Mawatari =

Mawatari is a Japanese surname. Notable people with the surname include:

- Hiroki Mawatari (馬渡 洋樹, born 1994), Japanese footballer
- Junki Mawatari (born 1996), Japanese footballer
- Kazuaki Mawatari (born 1991), Japanese footballer
- Matsuko Mawatari (born 1967), Japanese pop singer-songwriter
- Tatsuharu Mawatari (born 1957), Japanese politician
- Yuki Mawatari (born 1909), Japanese swimmer
