= Kitawaki =

Kitawaki (written: 北脇) is a Japanese surname. Notable people with the surname include:

- Kenji Kitawaki (北脇 健慈, born 1991), Japanese footballer
- Riki Kitawaki (北脇 里規, born 1985), Japanese footballer
