= Yuto =

Yuto may refer to:

- Yūto, a masculine Japanese given name
- Yūtō, Shizuoka, a former town in Hamana District, Shizuoka Prefecture, Japan
- Yuto, Jujuy, a city in Jujuy Province, Argentina
- Yutō, a wooden container used for serving hot liquids, as in kaiseki cuisine
