= Naoto Sawai =

Japanese footballer

Naoto Sawai 澤井 直人
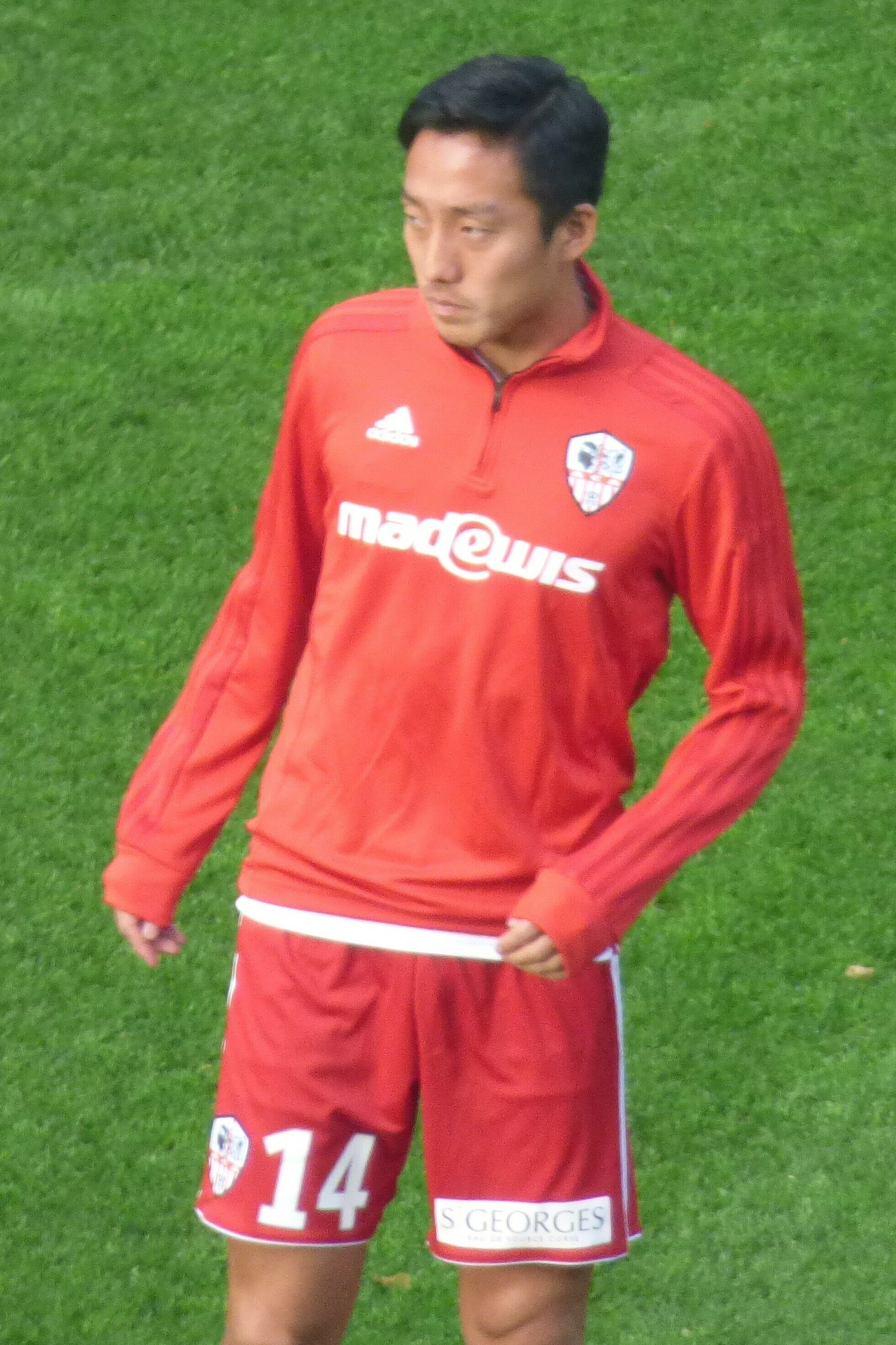
- Sawai in 2018

Personal information
- Date of birth: 3 April 1995 (age 31)
- Place of birth: Chiba, Japan
- Height: 1.76 m (5 ft 9 in)
- Position: Midfielder

Team information
- Current team: Criacao Shinjuku
- Number: 35

Youth career
- 2004–2013: Tokyo Verdy

Senior career*
Years	Team	Apps	(Gls)
2014–2020	Tokyo Verdy	111	(8)
2018–2019	→ Ajaccio II (loan)	13	(2)
2018–2019	→ Ajaccio (loan)	8	(1)
2021–2022	Renofa Yamaguchi	23	(1)
2022–	Criacao Shinjuku		
- * Club domestic league appearances and goals as of 21:50, 21 July 2022 (UTC)

Naoto Sawai (澤井 直人, Sawai Naoto; born 3 April 1995) is a Japanese professional footballer who plays as a midfielder for Criacao Shinjuku

== Career ==
Sawai joined J2 League club Tokyo Verdy in 2014.

== Career statistics ==
As of 1 February 2021

Appearances and goals by club, season and competition
Club	Season	League			Cup		Total	
Club	Season	Division	Apps	Goals	Apps	Goals	Apps	Goals
Tokyo Verdy	2014	J2 League	23	1	1	0	24	1
Tokyo Verdy	2015	J2 League	33	1	2	0	35	1
Tokyo Verdy	2016	J2 League	31	6	2	1	33	7
Tokyo Verdy	2017	J2 League	0	0	0	0	0	0
Tokyo Verdy	2018	J2 League	4	0	0	0	0	0
Tokyo Verdy	2019	J2 League	9	0	0	0	9	0
Tokyo Verdy	2020	J2 League	11	0	0	0	11	0
Tokyo Verdy	Total		111	8	5	2	116	10
Ajaccio (loan)	2018–19	Ligue 2	8	1	0	0	8	1
Career total			108	9	5	2	112	11
