= Mayara (footballer, born 1987) =

Brazilian footballer

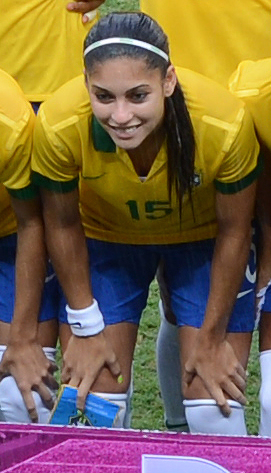
- Playing for Brazil in December 2013

Personal information
- Full name: Mayara da Fonseca Bordin
- Date of birth: 4 September 1987 (age 39)
- Place of birth: Xanxerê, Brazil
- Height: 1.66 m (5 ft 5 in)
- Position: Midfielder

College career
Years	Team	Apps	(Gls)
2006–2007	Feather River Golden Eagles		
2008–2010	FIU Panthers		

Senior career*
Years	Team	Apps	(Gls)
2011	Foz Cataratas		
2012–2013	Centro Olímpico		
2014	Tyresö FF		
2014–2015	Centro Olímpico	21	(2)
2014–2015	Corinthians/Audax	12	(1)
2018	Zaragoza CFF	12	(1)
2018–2019	Málaga	7	(0)

International career^{‡}
2013	Brazil	2	(0)
- * Club domestic league appearances and goals as of 03:37, 23 April 2024 (UTC) ‡ National team caps and goals as of 21:09, 14 July 2021 (UTC)

Mayara da Fonseca Bordin (born 4 September 1987), commonly known as Mayara or May, is a Brazilian former football midfielder who played for professional clubs in Brazil, Sweden and Spain, and for the Brazil women's national football team.

== Club career ==
=== Tyresö ===
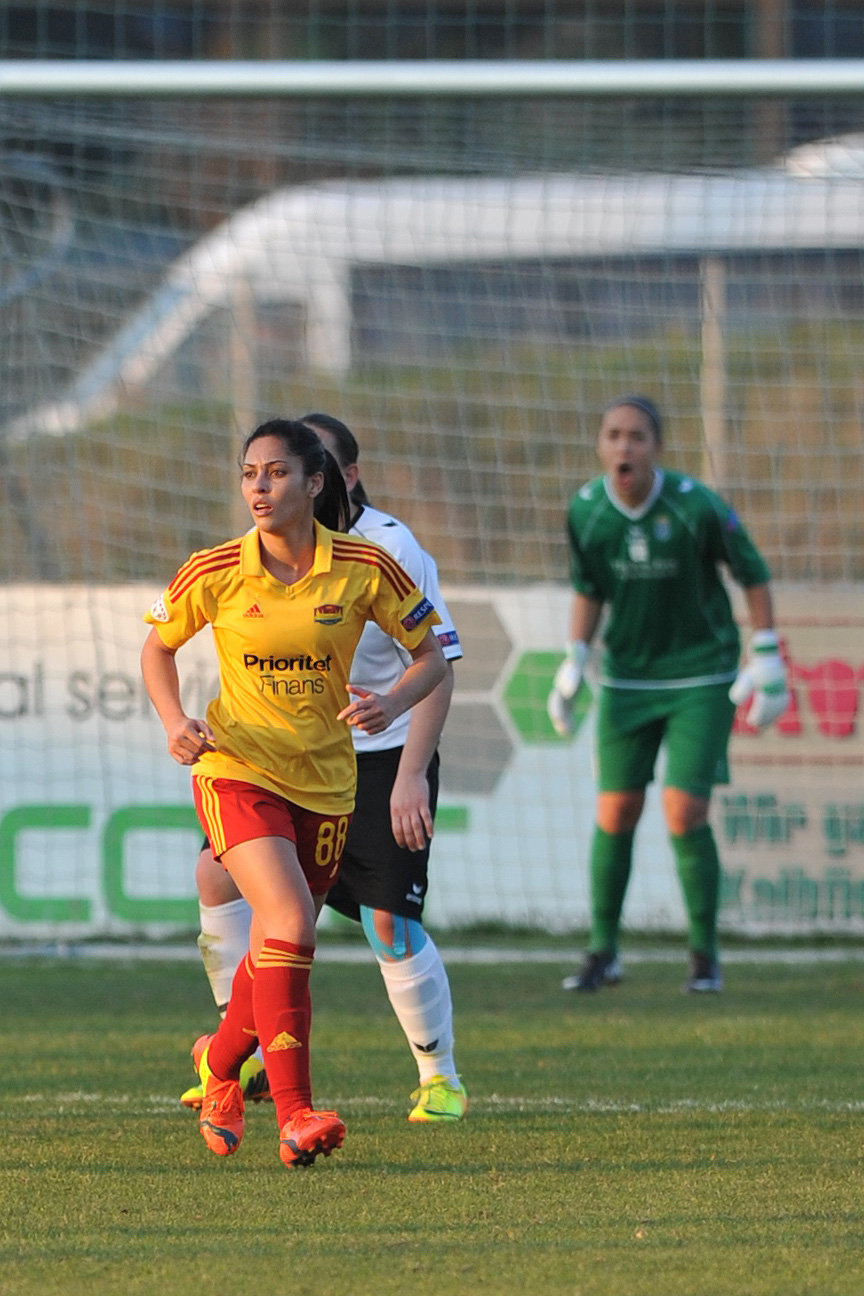
Mayara 2014

Mayara transferred from Centro Olímpico to Tyresö in January 2014, as one of four Brazilians to join the Swedish club.

Mayara was an unused substitute in Tyresö's 4–3 defeat by Wolfsburg in the 2014 UEFA Women's Champions League Final. Tyresö became insolvent in 2014 and were kicked out of the 2014 Damallsvenskan season, expunging all their results and making all their players free agents. The Stockholm County Administrative Board published the players' salaries, showing Mayara was a middle range earner at SEK 30 980 per month.

=== Second spell at Centro Olímpico ===
She returned to Centro Olímpico for the club's 2014 Campeonato Brasileiro de Futebol Feminino campaign. Mayara made her league debut against Avaí on 11 September 2014. She scored her first league goals against Portuguesa on 16 September 2015, scoring in the 79th and 85th minute.

=== Corinthians ===
Mayara made her league debut against Rio Preto on 27 January 2016. She scored her first league goal against Flamengo on 6 April 2016, scoring in the 82nd minute.

=== Zaragoza ===
Mayara made her league debut against Tenerife on 4 February 2018. She scored her first league goal against Levante on 18 March 2018, scoring in the 27th minute.

=== Málaga ===
Mayara made her league debut against Real Sociedad on 16 September 2018.

== Administrative career ==
Following two seasons in which she played in Spain, Mayara decided to retire from playing in 2019 to take an administrative role with Club Athletico Paranaense.

== International career ==
Mayara made her senior debut for Brazil in March 2013, in a 1–1 friendly draw with France in Rouen. In July 2013 she represented Brazil at the 2013 Summer Universiade in Kazan, Russia.
