= Tatsuya Okamoto =

Japanese footballer (born 1986)

Personal information
- Date of birth: September 19, 1986 (age 40)
- Place of birth: Shizuoka, Japan
- Height: 1.76 m (5 ft 9 in)
- Position: Forward

Team information
- Current team: Criacao Shinjuku
- Number: 50

Youth career
- 2002–2004: Júbilo Iwata
- 2007–2010: Juntendo University

Senior career*
Years	Team	Apps	(Gls)
2005–2006	Júbilo Iwata	0	(0)
2011–2012	Mito HollyHock	42	(11)
2013–2014	Gainare Tottori	53	(8)
2015-	Criacao Shinjuku	49	(19)
Total		144	(38)
- * Club domestic league appearances and goals

Tatsuya Okamoto (岡本 達也, Okamoto Tatsuya; born September 19, 1986) is a Japanese professional footballer who played as a forward. He is known for being a football player with three separate periods of professional career.

== Career ==
=== Júbilo Iwata ===
Okamoto studied at Iwata Minami High School, a public school known for its academic excellence. He trained at the youth team of Júbilo Iwata for three years. After high school graduation, he became a professional player for Iwata in 2005. However, he was unable to secure a position at the team and left in 2006.

=== Juntendo University ===
In December 2006, Okamoto returned to Iwata Minami High School, and asked the teachers for help in study. He applied to Juntendo University's Faculty of Sports and Health Science, and was accepted after spending only two months of studying for the entrance exam.

Okamoto made an immediate impact as a first-year student in the university's football team, earning the "Rookie of the Year" award in the Kanto University League." In the Emperor's Cup, where they progressed to the fourth round, he faced his former team, Jubilo Iwata. Although they lost 6-1, he scored a goal in the 23rd minute of the first half, which temporarily equalized the score. It was during this time that he wanted to become a professional footballer again.

=== Second professional career ===
In 2011, Okamoto joined the Mito HollyHock after graduation from Juntendo University. This is his second professional career. In 2013, he transferred to Gainare Tottori. In his second year with Tottori, he was appointed captain of the team that had been relegated to J3 League, but he was unable to lead them back to promotion. In 2015, he announced his retirement at the age of 27. During this period of time, he also worked as the vice president of Japan Pro-Footballers Association.

=== Criacao Shinjuku and third professional career ===
However, Okamoto's football career did not end. He joined Criacao Shinjuku, a regional team playing in the Kantō Soccer League in 2015. Since Okamoto has a teacher's license, he worked as a career consultant for university students while playing for the team. In 2017, Okamoto was appointed the general manager of Criacao Shinjuku while continuing to play for the club.

In 2021, Okamoto led Criacao Shinjuku to the promotion to Japan Football League (JFL), the fourth division with mostly professional teams. This is considered a great achievement for an amateur team.

In 2023, Criacao Shinjuku was promoted to J3 League. Since J3 is considered a professional league, this means Okamoto, at the age of 36, became a professional footballer for a third time. The team also won in the qualifier of Emperor's Cup, with Okamoto scoring the decisive goal. This earned him media attention. In a featured article in 2024, Mainichi Shimbun described him as "the loser who stayed till the end".

In an interview in September 2025, Okamoto expressed his view on football, saying that modern football is too systematic and he believes giving player agency can lead to better results.

== Personal life ==
Okamoto is from Hamamatsu, Shizuoka, Japan.

== Career statistics ==
Appearances and goals by club, season and competition
Club	Season	League			Emperor's Cup		J.League Cup		Asia		Total	
Club	Season	Division	Apps	Goals	Apps	Goals	Apps	Goals	Apps	Goals	Apps	Goals
Júbilo Iwata	2004	J1 League	0	0	0	0	0	0	1	0	1	0
Júbilo Iwata	2005	J1 League	0	0	2	0	0	0	–		2	0
Júbilo Iwata	2006	J1 League	0	0	0	0	0	0	–		0	0
Júbilo Iwata	Total		0	0	2	0	0	0	1	0	3	0
Mito HollyHock	2011	J2 League										
Career total			0	0	2	0	0	0	1	0	3	0
