= Shoto Suzuki =

Japanese footballer (born 1992)

Shoto Suzuki 鈴木 翔登
Personal information
- Full name: Shoto Suzuki
- Date of birth: 16 October 1992 (age 34)
- Place of birth: Saitama, Japan
- Height: 1.84 m (6 ft 0 in)
- Position: Defender

Team information
- Current team: Criacao Shinjuku (from 2023)

Youth career
- 2011–2014: Ryutsu Keizai University

Senior career*
Years	Team	Apps	(Gls)
2015–2020	Roasso Kumamoto	83	(3)
2017	→ Giravanz Kitakyushu (loan)	6	(0)
2021	Kataller Toyama	2	(0)
2022	Fukushima United	0	(0)
2023–	Criacao Shinjuku	0	(0)
- * Club domestic league appearances and goals as of 20 November 2022, 20:36 (UTC)

Shoto Suzuki (鈴木 翔登, Suzuki Shōto; born 16 October 1992 in Saitama) is a Japanese footballer who will play for Criacao Shinjuku from 2023.

== Career ==
On 17 December 2022, Suzuki transferred to JFL club Criacao Shinjuku for the upcoming 2023 season, giving up on his announced retirement made in July of the same year.

== Career statistics ==
Updated to the end of the 2022 season.

Club performance			League		Cup		Total	
Season	Club	League	Apps	Goals	Apps	Goals	Apps	Goals
Japan			League		Emperor's Cup		Total	
2015	Roasso Kumamoto	J2 League	23	0	2	0	25	0
2016	Roasso Kumamoto	J2 League	8	0	2	0	10	0
2018	Roasso Kumamoto	J2 League	16	2	2	0	18	2
2019	Roasso Kumamoto	J3 League	33	1	1	0	34	1
2020	Roasso Kumamoto	J3 League	3	0	0	0	3	0
2017	Giravanz Kitakyushu (loan)	J3 League	6	0	2	0	8	0
2021	Kataller Toyama	J3 League	2	0	2	2	4	2
2022	Fukushima United	J3 League	0	0	0	0	0	0
2023	Criacao Shinjuku	0	0	0	0	0	0	
Career total			91	3	10	2	101	5
