= Criacao Shinjuku =

Japanese football club

Criacao Shinjuku クリアソン新宿
- Full name: Criacao Shinjuku
- Nickname: Criacao
- Founded: 2005; 21 years ago
- Stadium: AGF Field
- Capacity: 2,800
- Owner: Criacao Corporation
- Chairman: Kazutomo Maruyama
- Manager: Hideaki Kitajima
- Coach: Ichiro Naruyama
- League: Japan Football League
- 2025: 12th of 16
- Website: criacao.co.jp/soccerclub
Home colours	Away colours

Criacao Shinjuku (クリアソン新宿, Kuriason Shinjuku) is a Japanese semi-professional football club based in Shinjuku, Tokyo. They currently play in the Japan Football League, Japanese fourth tier football league, since 2022.

== History ==
The club was founded by the current chairman Kazutomo Maruyama as a leisure club under the name Criacao in 2005 to create an opportunity to play football even after completing his studies at Rikkyō University. After Maruyama's professional return to Tokyo, he first registered for the Japan Football Association in 2009.

=== Club name ===
Criacao is from the Portuguese criação and means translated as much as "creation", "production". In doing so, the club alludes to the club's philosophy, which states it aims to achieve "continuous generation of enthusiasm in the world through football".

=== Road to the JFL ===
From 2010 to 2018, the club only played in the Tokyo Leagues, not going further than it until the club saw promotion on 2018, after finishing as runners-up in Tokyo's 1st division. After nine seasons the club finally got to debut at regional level, in the 2nd division of the Kantō Soccer League.

Immediately after being promoted to it, the club earned the division's title after winning 43 out of 51 possible points, and then, were promoted to the 1st division. Debuting on it in 2020, the club only earned a 5th-place finish.

In 2021, Criacao Shinjuku secured promotion for the Japan Football League (JFL), the 4th tier of Japanese football, via the Japanese Regional Football Champions League, which is JFL's promotion/relegation series.

=== JFL (2022–) ===
In 2022, Criacao Shinjuku finished in the 15th place of the competition, out of the 16 participating teams for the season. The club, however, was not relegated back to the Kantō League, as JFL's top 2 teams were promoted to the J3. Under the league system, Criacao would only be relegated as the 15th-placed team if no team earned promotion to the J3 during the season, which was not the case. The club also currently holds the Japan Football League attendance record, made on 9 October 2022. A crowd of 16,218 people watched the match between Suzuka Point Getters and Criacao Shinjuku at the Japan National Stadium, in Shinjuku, being the record heavily influenced by the presence of Japan former international Kazuyoshi Miura. The match ended in a 1–0 loss for Criacao.

On 26 September 2023, Criacao Shinjuku officially obtained a J3 League license.

The 2026–27 season is Criacao's fifth consecutive season in JFL.

== League & cup record ==
Champions	Runners-up	Third place	Promoted	Relegated

League												Emperor's Cup	Shakaijin Cup
Season	Division	Tier	Pos.	P	W	D	L	F	A	GD	Pts	Emperor's Cup	Shakaijin Cup
2010	Tokyo Metropolitan; League	9	2nd	10	9	0	1	31	1	30	27	Did not qualify	Ineligible
2011	Tokyo Metropolitan; League	8	1st	10	10	0	0	51	4	47	30	Did not qualify	Ineligible
2012	Tokyo Metropolitan; League	7	2nd	12	10	1	1	32	5	27	31	Did not qualify	Ineligible
2013	Tokyo Metropolitan; League	7	1st	13	12	0	1	59	7	52	36	Did not qualify	Ineligible
2014	Tokyo 1st Division	7	1st	14	9	4	1	30	12	18	31	Did not qualify	Ineligible
2015	Tokyo 1st Division	7	3rd	14	9	4	1	34	12	22	31	Did not qualify	Ineligible
2016	Tokyo 1st Division	7	2nd	13	9	3	1	29	14	15	30	Did not qualify	Ineligible
2017	Tokyo 1st Division	7	7th	13	6	1	6	24	22	2	19	Did not qualify	Ineligible
2018	Tokyo 1st Division	7	2nd	15	11	2	2	35	8	27	35	Did not qualify	Ineligible
2019	Kantō 2nd Division	6	1st	18	14	1	3	42	20	22	43	Did not qualify	Ineligible
2020	Kantō 1st Division	5	5th	9	5	0	4	11	7	4	15	Did not qualify	Not held
2021	Kantō 1st Division	5	1st	22	16	2	4	50	23	27	50	Did not qualify	Cancelled (Note: Criacao was scheduled to play the tournament, from the 1st round, where they would be playing Tadotsu FC. The 2020 competition was deemed cancelled before its start, in response to COVID-19-related issues, that only allowed the competition to be played again the year after.)
2022	JFL	4	15th	30	6	6	18	30	52	-22	24	Did not qualify	Ineligible
2023	JFL	4	11th	28	10	4	14	25	33	-8	34	1st round	Ineligible
2024	JFL	4	14th	30	5	11	14	19	44	-25	26	Did not qualify	Ineligible
2025	JFL	4	12th	30	8	9	15	29	34	-5	33	Did not qualify	Ineligible
2026–27	JFL	4	TBD	30								TBD	Ineligible

Key

- Pos. = Position in league; P = Games played; W = Games won; D = Games drawn; L = Games lost; F = Goals for; A = Goal against; GD = Goal difference; Pts = Points gained
- JFL Data

== Honours ==
Criacao Shinjuku honours
Honours	No.	Years
Tokyo Metropolitan Government Division 2	1	2011
Tokyo Metropolitan Government Division 1	1	2013
Tokyo Division 1	1	2014
Kantō Division 2	1	2019
Kantō Division 1	1	2021
Japanese Regional Football Champions League	1	2021

== Current squad ==
As of 4 April 2024.

Note: Flags indicate national team as defined under FIFA eligibility rules; some limited exceptions apply. Players may hold more than one non-FIFA nationality.

No.	Pos.	Nation	Player
1	GK	JPN	Yuta Abe
2	MF	JPN	Kazuki Segawa
3	FW	JPN	Junki Koike
4	DF	JPN	Yuya Aizawa (on loan from Roasso Kumamoto)
5	MF	JPN	Keita Ishii
7	MF	JPN	Eisuke Atsumi
8	MF	JPN	Takeaki Sudo (captain)
9	FW	JPN	Ryo Harada
11	FW	JPN	Hiroki Scharod Akai
13	MF	JPN	Koya Takahashi
14	MF	JPN	Naoto Sawai
15	DF	JPN	Yu Yonehara
16	DF	JPN	Ryotaro Takeuchi (on loan from Sagan Tosu)
17	MF	JPN	Yuki Ikeya
18	FW	JPN	Kazuki Saito

No.	Pos.	Nation	Player
19	MF	JPN	Masaki Ueno
21	MF	JPN	Yuto Nakayama
23	GK	JPN	Sotaro Tsuruta
24	MF	JPN	Daiki Nishiyama
25	DF	JPN	Jotaro Chiba
27	GK	JPN	Suguru Asanuma
29	DF	JPN	Naoki Koyahara
30	MF	JPN	Shinto Kojima
31	FW	JPN	Junya Osaki
33	FW	JPN	Tsubasa Sano
37	MF	PRK	Hwang Song-su
39	DF	JPN	Shoto Suzuki
41	GK	JPN	Nao Iwadate
44	MF	JPN	Seiji Imai
50	FW	JPN	Tatsuya Okamoto

== Club staff ==
Position	Staff
Manager	(Japan) Hideaki Kitajima
Assistant manager	(Japan) Ichiro Nariyama
First-team coach	(Japan) Musashi Saida
Goalkeeper Coach	(Japan) Kazushige Kirihata
Doctor	(Japan) Takahisa Haraguchi
Trainer	(Japan) Keigo Nakahara (Japan) Atsushi Takai (Japan) Satoko Maeda
Competent	(Japan) Taichi Ise
Side affairs	(Japan) Sho Nakamura (Japan) Miu Hirotani

== Managerial history ==
Manager	Nationality	Tenure	
Manager	Nationality	Start	Finish
Ichiro Naruyama	Japan	1 February 2018	31 January 2024
Hideaki Kitajima	Japan	16 November 2023	present

== See also ==
- Japan Football Association (JFA)
