= Kazuki Segawa =

Japanese footballer

Kazuki Segawa 瀬川 和樹
Personal information
- Full name: Kazuki Segawa
- Date of birth: 25 April 1990 (age 36)
- Place of birth: Miyoshi, Hiroshima, Japan
- Height: 1.78 m (5 ft 10 in)
- Position: Left back

Team information
- Current team: Criacao Shinjuku
- Number: 6

Youth career
- 2009–2012: Kokushikan University

Senior career*
Years	Team	Apps	(Gls)
2013–2014	Thespakusatsu Gunma	55	(4)
2015–2017	Montedio Yamagata	25	(0)
2018–2019	Renofa Yamaguchi	36	(0)
2019–2020	Tochigi SC	58	(0)
2020-	Criacao Shinjuku	20	(1)
- * Club domestic league appearances and goals as of 20:42, 5 June 2022 (UTC)

Kazuki Segawa (瀬川 和樹, Segawa Kazuki) is a Japanese professional footballer who plays as a defender for Criacao Shinjuku in the Japan Football League.

== Playing career ==
He joined Thespakusatsu Gunma after being selected for Kanto University selection B, and debuted for Thespakusatsu Gunma against Tochigi SC on 31 March 2013. He transferred to Montedio Yamagata in 2014, then made his competitive debut for the club in a J.League Cup match against Vegalta Sendai.

In 2021, citing the warmth he received from their approach as a human being other than a player, he joined Criacao Shinjuku.

== Career statistics ==
Updated to 23 February 2020.

Appearances and goals by club, season and competition
Club	Season	League			Emperor's Cup		J.League Cup		Total	
Club	Season	Division	Apps	Goals	Apps	Goals	Apps	Goals	Apps	Goals
Thespakusatsu Gunma	2013	J2 League	18	1	1	0	—		19	1
Thespakusatsu Gunma	2014	J2 League	37	3	3	0	—		40	3
Montedio Yamagata	2015	J1 League	1	0	1	0	2	0	4	0
Montedio Yamagata	2016	J2 League	1	0	0	0	—		5	0
Montedio Yamagata	2017	J2 League	23	0	0	0	—		23	0
Renofa Yamaguchi	2018	J2 League	23	0	0	0	—		23	0
Renofa Yamaguchi	2019	J2 League	13	0	0	0	—		13	0
Tochigi SC	2019	J2 League	18	0	0	0	—		18	0
Career total			134	4	5	0	2	0	141	4
