= Suguru Asanuma =

Japanese football player

Suguru Asanuma 浅沼 優瑠
Personal information
- Full name: Suguru Asanuma
- Date of birth: 12 April 1992 (age 34)
- Place of birth: Hokkaido, Japan
- Height: 1.83 m (6 ft 0 in)
- Position: Goalkeeper

Team information
- Current team: Criacao Shinjuku
- Number: 27

Youth career
- 2011–2014: Toyo University

Senior career*
Years	Team	Apps	(Gls)
2015–2018	YSCC Yokohama	61	(0)
2019	SC Sagamihara	2	(0)
2019	→ Tochigi SC (loan)	0	(0)
2020–2021	Kamatamare Sanuki	2	(0)
2022	V-Varen Nagasaki	0	(0)
2023–	Criacao Shinjuku	0	(0)
- * Club domestic league appearances and goals as of 21 February 2023, 10:00 (UTC)

Suguru Asanuma (浅沼 優瑠, Asanuma Suguru; born April 12, 1992) is a Japanese football player. He currently play for Criacao Shinjuku.

== Career ==
On 2 February 2023, Asanuma announcement officially transfer to JFL club, Criacao Shinjuku for ahead of 2023 season.

== Career statistics ==
Updated to the start of 2023 season.

Appearances and goals by club, season and competition
Club	Season	League			Emperor's Cup		Total	
Club	Season	Division	Apps	Goals	Apps	Goals	Apps	Goals
YSCC Yokohama	2015	J3 League	0	0	–		0	0
YSCC Yokohama	2016	J3 League	6	0	–		6	0
YSCC Yokohama	2017	J3 League	23	0	1	0	24	0
YSCC Yokohama	2018	J3 League	32	0	2	0	34	0
SC Sagamihara	2019	J3 League	2	0	–		2	0
Tochigi SC	2019	J2 League	0	0	–		0	0
Kamatamare Sanuki	2020	J3 League	0	0	–		0	0
Kamatamare Sanuki	2021	J3 League	2	0	–		2	0
V-Varen Nagasaki	2022	J2 League	0	0	–		0	0
Criacao Shinjuku	2023	Japan Football League	0	0	–		0	0
Total			65	0	3	0	68	0
