= Kaito Kubo =

Japanese footballer

Kaito Kubo 久保海都
Personal information
- Full name: Kaito Kubo
- Date of birth: 5 November 1993 (age 33)
- Place of birth: Morioka, Japan
- Height: 1.80 m (5 ft 11 in)
- Position: Defender

Youth career
- 2009–2011: Iwate Prefectural Morioka; Commercial High School
- 2012–2015: Kanto Gakuin University

Senior career*
Years	Team	Apps	(Gls)
2016–2018	Grulla Morioka	43	(2)
2019–	Omiya Club		
- * Club domestic league appearances and goals as of 23 February 2019

Kaito Kubo (久保海都, Kubo, Kaito; born 5 November 1993 in Morioka) is a former Japanese footballer who last played for Grulla Morioka.

== Club statistics ==
Updated to 23 February 2018.

Club performance			League		Cup		Total	
Season	Club	League	Apps	Goals	Apps	Goals	Apps	Goals
Japan			League		Emperor's Cup		Total	
2016	Grulla Morioka	J3 League	29	2	3	0	32	2
2017	Grulla Morioka	J3 League	14	0	1	0	15	0
2018	Grulla Morioka	J3 League	12	0	0	0	12	0
Career total			55	2	4	0	59	2
