= Naoto Ando =

Japanese footballer

Naoto Ando 安藤由翔
Personal information
- Full name: Naoto Ando
- Date of birth: 28 August 1991 (age 35)
- Place of birth: Kobe, Japan
- Height: 1.75 m (5 ft 9 in)
- Position: Midfielder

Team information
- Current team: Vanraure Hachinohe
- Number: 61

Youth career
- Wakakusa SSC
- –2009: FC Raios

College career
Years	Team	Apps	(Gls)
2010–2013	Kyoto Sangyo University		

Senior career*
Years	Team	Apps	(Gls)
2013–2015	Gainare Tottori	66	(7)
2016	Renofa Yamaguchi	13	(0)
2017	Tochigi SC	5	(0)
2017–2018	Giravanz Kitakyushu	33	(2)
2019–2020	Fujieda MYFC	52	(0)
2021–2023	Kataller Toyama	69	(6)
2024–	Vanraure Hachinohe	41	(1)
- * Club domestic league appearances and goals as of 1 January 2026

Naoto Ando (安藤 由翔, Andō Naoto; born 28 August 1991 in Kobe) is a Japanese footballer who plays for Vanraure Hachinohe.

== Club statistics ==
Updated to 23 February 2018.

Club performance			League		Cup		Total	
Season	Club	League	Apps	Goals	Apps	Goals	Apps	Goals
Japan			League		Emperor's Cup		Total	
2013	Gainare Tottori	J2 League	7	1	–		7	1
2014	Gainare Tottori	J3 League	24	1	2	1	26	2
2015	Gainare Tottori	J3 League	35	5	2	1	37	6
2016	Renofa Yamaguchi	J2 League	13	0	2	1	15	1
2017	Tochigi SC	J3 League	5	0	–		5	0
2017	Giravanz Kitakyushu	J3 League	6	1	–		6	1
Career total			90	8	6	3	96	11
