= Kazuki Hattori =

Japanese footballer

Personal information
- Date of birth: 16 March 1995 (age 31)
- Place of birth: Suginami, Tokyo, Japan
- Height: 1.82 m (6 ft 0 in)
- Position: Goalkeeper

Team information
- Current team: Fukushima United
- Number: 16

Youth career
- 2004–2006: Fujimigaoka Boys' Kicking Team
- 2007–2009: FC Tokyo
- 2010–2012: Sapporo Otani HS
- 2013–2016: Meiji University

Senior career*
Years	Team	Apps	(Gls)
2017–2018	Kataller Toyama	0	(0)
2019–2020	Kamatamare Sanuki	9	(0)
2021–	Fukushima United	0	(0)
- * Club domestic league appearances and goals as of 17:04, 13 July 2021 (UTC)

Kazuki Hattori (服部 一輝, Hattori Kazuki; born 16 March 1995) is a Japanese footballer currently playing as a goalkeeper for Fukushima United.

== Career statistics ==
=== Club ===
As of 13 July 2021.

Club	Season	League			National Cup		League Cup		Other		Total	
Club	Season	Division	Apps	Goals	Apps	Goals	Apps	Goals	Apps	Goals	Apps	Goals
Kataller Toyama	2017	J3 League	0	0	0	0	–		0	0	0	0
Kataller Toyama	2018	J3 League	0	0	0	0	–		0	0	0	0
Kataller Toyama	Total		0	0	0	0	0	0	0	0	0	0
Kamatamare Sanuki	2019	J3 League	0	0	1 (Note: Appearance(s) in Emperor's Cup)	0	–		0	0	1	0
Kamatamare Sanuki	2020	J3 League	9	0	0	0	–		0	0	10	0
Kamatamare Sanuki	Total		9	0	1	0	0	0	0	0	10	0
Fukushima United	2021	J3 League	0	0	0	0	–		0	0	0	0
Career total			9	0	1	0	0	0	0	0	10	0
