= Masanobu Matsufuji =

Japanese footballer

Masanobu Matsufuji 松藤 正伸
Personal information
- Full name: Masanobu Matsufuji
- Date of birth: April 27, 1992 (age 34)
- Place of birth: Nerima, Tokyo, Japan
- Height: 1.69 m (5 ft 6 1/2 in)
- Position: Defender

Team information
- Current team: Azul Claro Numazu
- Number: 27

Youth career
- 2008–2010: FC Tokyo
- 2011–2014: Meiji University

Senior career*
Years	Team	Apps	(Gls)
2015–2016	Sony Sendai	37	(1)
2017–2018	Azul Claro Numazu	20	(1)
- * Club domestic league appearances and goals as of 2 January 2019

Masanobu Matsufuji (松藤 正伸, Matsufuji Masanobu; born April 27, 1992) is a former Japanese football player. He last played for Azul Claro Numazu.

== Career ==
Masanobu Matsufuji joined Japan Football League club Sony Sendai in 2015. He moved to J3 League club Azul Claro Numazu in 2017, retiring in January 2019.

== Club statistics ==
Updated to 2 January 2019.

Club performance			League		Cup		Total	
Season	Club	League	Apps	Goals	Apps	Goals	Apps	Goals
Japan			League		Emperor's Cup		Total	
2015	Sony Sendai FC	JFL	24	1	0	0	24	1
2016	Sony Sendai FC	JFL	13	0	0	0	13	0
2017	Azul Claro Numazu	J3 League	15	1	1	0	16	1
2018	Azul Claro Numazu	J3 League	5	0	–		5	0
Total			57	2	1	0	58	2
