= Yuki Ikeya =

Japanese footballer

Yuki Ikeda 池谷友喜
Personal information
- Full name: Yuki Ikeda
- Date of birth: 27 June 1995 (age 31)
- Place of birth: Matsudo, Japan
- Height: 1.63 m (5 ft 4 in)
- Position: Midfielder

Team information
- Current team: Criacao Shinjuku
- Number: 37

Youth career
- Roasso Kumamoto
- 2014–2017: Chuo University

Senior career*
Years	Team	Apps	(Gls)
2018–2019	Roasso Kumamoto	1	(0)
2019-2021	Kamatamare Sanuki	47	(3)
2021-	Criacao Shinjuku	90	(16)
- * Club domestic league appearances and goals as of 22 August 2024 @ 05:15(AEST)

Yuki Ikeya (池谷 友喜, Ikeya Yūki; born 27 June 1995) is a Japanese football player.

== Personal life ==
Ikeya was born in Kumamoto Prefecture on 27 June 1995. After graduating from Chuo University, Tokyo.

== Playing career ==
After playing for the football team of Chuo University, Sakamoto signed for Roasso Kumamoto in December 2017.

Club performance			League		Cup		Total	
Season	Club	League	Apps	Goals	Apps	Goals	Apps	Goals
Japan			League		Emperor's Cup		Total	
2018	Roasso Kumamoto	J2 League	1	0	1	0	2	0
Career total			1	0	1	0	2	0
