= Yu Yonehara =

Japanese footballer

Yu Yonehara 米原 祐
Personal information
- Full name: Yu Yonehara
- Date of birth: August 18, 1994 (age 32)
- Place of birth: Kobe, Japan
- Height: 1.83 m (6 ft 0 in)
- Position: Defender

Team information
- Current team: Criacao Shinjuku
- Number: 4

Youth career
- 2013–2016: Kwansei Gakuin University

Senior career*
Years	Team	Apps	(Gls)
2017–	SC Sagamihara	19	(2)
- * Club domestic league appearances and goals as of 22 February 2018

Yu Yonehara (米原 祐, Yonehara Yū; born August 18, 1994) is a Japanese football player. He plays for Criacao Shinjuku.

== Career ==
Yu Yonehara joined J3 League club Criacao Shinjuku in 2020.

== Club statistics ==
Updated to 22 February 2018.

Club performance			League		Cup		Total	
Season	Club	League	Apps	Goals	Apps	Goals	Apps	Goals
Japan			League		Emperor's Cup		Total	
2017	SC Sagamihara	J3 League	19	2	–		19	2
Total			19	2	0	0	19	2
