= Natsuki Mugikura =

Japanese footballer

Natsuki Mugikura 麦倉捺木
Personal information
- Full name: Natsuki Mugikura
- Date of birth: May 22, 1996 (age 30)
- Place of birth: Tokyo, Japan
- Height: 1.77 m (5 ft 9 1/2 in)
- Position: Defender

Team information
- Current team: SC Sagamihara
- Number: 20

Youth career
- Kashiwa Reysol Youth

Senior career*
Years	Team	Apps	(Gls)
2015–2016	Mito HollyHock	0	(0)
2015	→ J. League U-22 (loan)	5	(0)
2017–	SC Sagamihara	13	(0)
- * Club domestic league appearances and goals as of 23 February 2018

Natsuki Mugikura (麦倉 捺木, Mugikura Natsuki; born May 22, 1996 in Tokyo) is a Japanese football player. He plays for SC Sagamihara.

== Career statistics ==
Updated to 23 February 2018.

Appearances and goals by club, season and competition
Club	Season	League			Emperor's Cup		Total	
Club	Season	Division	Apps	Goals	Apps	Goals	Apps	Goals
Mito HollyHock	2015	J2 League	0	0	1	0	1	0
Mito HollyHock	2016	J2 League	0	0	2	0	2	0
SC Sagamihara	2017	J3 League	13	0	–		13	0
Career total			13	0	3	0	16	0
