= Yuto Nakayama =

Japanese footballer (born 1991)

Yuto Nakayama 中山 雄登
Personal information
- Full name: Yuto Nakayama
- Date of birth: April 11, 1991 (age 35)
- Place of birth: Hiroshima, Japan
- Height: 1.63 m (5 ft 4 in)
- Position: Midfielder

Team information
- Current team: Criacao Shinjuku (from 2023)

Youth career
- 2010–2013: Ryutsu Keizai University FC

Senior career*
Years	Team	Apps	(Gls)
2014–2019	Roasso Kumamoto	171	(2)
2020–2022	Thespakusatsu Gunma	45	(1)
2023–	Criacao Shinjuku	0	(0)
- * Club domestic league appearances and goals as of 23 October 2022, 18:20 (UTC)

Yuto Nakayama (中山 雄登, Nakayama Yuto; born April 11, 1991 in Hiroshima) is a Japanese football who will play for Criacao Shinjuku from the 2023 season.

== Career ==
In 2010, Nakayama begin first career with Ryutsu Keizai University.

In 2013, Nakayama joined to J2 club, Roasso Kumamoto from 2014 until he left from the club in 2019 after six seasons at Kumamoto.

In 2020, Nakayama joined to J2 club, Thespakusatsu Gunma until end of the 2022 season.

On 30 November 2022, Nakayama officially transfer to JFL club, Criacao Shinjuku for upcoming 2023 season.

== Career statistics ==
As of the end of the 2022 season.

Appearances and goals by club, season and competition
Club	Season	League			Emperor's Cup		Total	
Club	Season	Division	Apps	Goals	Apps	Goals	Apps	Goals
Ryutsu Keizai University	2010	Japan Football League	12	0	0	0	12	0
Roasso Kumamoto	2014	J2 League	37	0	1	0	38	0
Roasso Kumamoto	2015	J2 League	35	0	2	0	37	0
Roasso Kumamoto	2016	J2 League	19	0	2	0	21	0
Roasso Kumamoto	2017	J2 League	17	0	1	0	18	0
Roasso Kumamoto	2018	J2 League	32	1	1	0	33	1
Roasso Kumamoto	2019	J3 League	31	1	1	0	32	1
Thespakusatsu Gunma	2020	J2 League	12	0	0	0	12	0
Thespakusatsu Gunma	2021	J2 League	30	1	1	0	31	1
Thespakusatsu Gunma	2022	J2 League	3	0	2	0	5	0
Criacao Shinjuku	2023	Japan Football League	0	0	0	0	0	0
Career total			228	3	11	0	239	3
