= Naoya Yoshida =

Japanese footballer

Naoya Yoshida 吉田直矢
Personal information
- Full name: Naoya Yoshida
- Date of birth: December 20, 1994 (age 31)
- Place of birth: Saitama, Japan
- Height: 1.75 m (5 ft 9 in)
- Position: Midfielder

Team information
- Current team: Thespakusatsu Gunma
- Number: 14

Youth career
- 2010–2012: Kawasaki Frontale Youth
- 2013–2016: University of Tsukuba

Senior career*
Years	Team	Apps	(Gls)
2017	Tonan Maebashi	11	(3)
2017–	Thespakusatsu Gunma	3	(0)
- * Club domestic league appearances and goals as of 22 February 2018

Naoya Yoshida (吉田 直矢, Yoshida Naoya; born December 20, 1994) is a Japanese football player. He plays for Thespakusatsu Gunma.

== Career ==
Naoya Yoshida joined Tonan Maebashi in 2017. In August, he moved to Thespakusatsu Gunma.

== Club statistics ==
Updated to 22 February 2018.

Club performance			League		Cup		Total	
Season	Club	League	Apps	Goals	Apps	Goals	Apps	Goals
Japan			League		Emperor's Cup		Total	
2017	Tonan Maebashi	JRL (Kanto, Div. 2)	11	3	2	1	13	4
2017	Thespakusatsu Gunma	J2 League	3	0	0	0	3	0
Total			14	3	2	1	16	4
