= Karen García =

Mexican footballer (born 1992)

Personal information
- Full name: Karen Andrea García Márquez
- Date of birth: 3 November 1992 (age 34)
- Place of birth: Guadalajara, Jalisco, Mexico
- Height: 1.66 m (5 ft 5 in)
- Position: Defensive midfielder

Senior career*
Years	Team	Apps	(Gls)
2018–2025	Atlas	190	(7)
- * Club domestic league appearances and goals as of 4 June 2023

Karen Andrea García Márquez (born 3 November 1992) is a Mexican professional footballer who played as a Defensive midfielder for Liga MX Femenil side Atlas.

== Career ==
In 2018, she started her career in Atlas. She is one of the most capped players in the history of the club.
