= Yuto Oshiro =

Japanese footballer (born 1996)

Personal information
- Date of birth: 19 October 1996 (age 30)
- Place of birth: Aichi, Japan
- Height: 1.66 m (5 ft 5 in)
- Position: Midfielder

Team information
- Current team: Okinawa SV
- Number: 23

Youth career
- 2012–2014: Chukyo Univ. Chukyo High School

College career
Years	Team	Apps	(Gls)
2015–2018	Chukyo University		

Senior career*
Years	Team	Apps	(Gls)
2019–2021	Nagano Parceiro	37	(2)
2021-	Okinawa SV	78	(11)
Total		115	(13)
- * Club domestic league appearances and goals as of 24/1/24 @ 15:14(AEST)

Yuto Oshiro (大城 佑斗, Oshiro Yuto; born 19 October 1996) is a Japanese footballer currently playing as a midfielder for Nagano Parceiro.

== Career statistics ==
=== Club ===
As of 12 November 2020.

Club	Season	League			National Cup		League Cup		Other		Total	
Club	Season	Division	Apps	Goals	Apps	Goals	Apps	Goals	Apps	Goals	Apps	Goals
Nagano Parceiro	2019	J3 League	15	2	2 (Note: Appearances in the Emperor's Cup)	0	–		0	0	17	2
Nagano Parceiro	2020	J3 League	16	0	0	0	–		0	0	16	0
Career total			31	2	2	0	0	0	0	0	33	2
