= Masahiro Teraoka =

Japanese footballer

Personal information
- Date of birth: 13 November 1991 (age 35)
- Place of birth: Takamatsu, Kagawa, Japan
- Height: 1.79 m (5 ft 10 in)
- Position: Defender

Youth career
- 2007–2009: Vissel Kobe

College career
Years	Team	Apps	(Gls)
2010–2013	Kansai University		

Senior career*
Years	Team	Apps	(Gls)
2014–2016	Giravanz Kitakyushu	34	(0)
2017–2018	AC Nagano Parceiro		
2019	Giravanz Kitakyushu	28	(0)
- * Club domestic league appearances and goals as of 1 January 2021

Masahiro Teraoka (寺岡 真弘, Teraoka Masahiro; born 13 November 1991 in Takamatsu, Kagawa) is a Japanese footballer who plays for Giravanz Kitakyushu.

== Club statistics ==
Updated to 23 February 2017.

Club performance			League		Cup		Total	
Season	Club	League	Apps	Goals	Apps	Goals	Apps	Goals
Japan			League		Emperor's Cup		Total	
2014	Giravanz Kitakyushu	J2 League	2	0	0	0	2	0
2015	Giravanz Kitakyushu	J2 League	14	0	0	0	14	0
2016	Giravanz Kitakyushu	J2 League	18	0	1	0	19	0
Career total			34	0	1	0	35	0
