= Ryo Kubota (footballer, born 1991) =

Japanese footballer

Ryo Kubota 窪田 良
Personal information
- Full name: Ryo Kubota
- Date of birth: 8 April 1991 (age 35)
- Place of birth: Tokyo, Japan
- Height: 1.75 m (5 ft 9 in)
- Position: Midfielder

Team information
- Current team: SC Sagamihara
- Number: 20

Youth career
- Tokyo Verdy

College career
Years	Team	Apps	(Gls)
2010–2013	Hannan University		

Senior career*
Years	Team	Apps	(Gls)
2014–2016	Tokushima Vortis	2	(0)
2016	→ Kataller Toyama (loan)	28	(1)
2017	Kataller Toyama	26	(0)
2018	Ventforet Kofu	13	(0)
2019	Thespakusatsu Gunma		
- * Club domestic league appearances and goals as of 2 May 2020

Ryo Kubota (窪田 良, Kubota Ryō; born 8 April 1991 in Tokyo) is a Japanese footballer who plays for SC Sagamihara.

== Club statistics ==
Updated to 23 February 2018.

Club performance			League		Cup		League Cup		Total	
Season	Club	League	Apps	Goals	Apps	Goals	Apps	Goals	Apps	Goals
Japan			League		Emperor's Cup		J. League Cup		Total	
2014	Tokushima Vortis	J1 League	2	0	0	0	3	1	5	1
2015	Tokushima Vortis	J2 League	0	0	2	0	–		2	0
2016	Kataller Toyama	J3 League	28	1	2	0	–		30	1
2017	Kataller Toyama	J3 League	26	0	2	0	–		28	0
Career total			56	1	6	0	3	1	65	2
