= Junki Mawatari =

Japanese footballer

Personal information
- Full name: Junki Mawatari
- Date of birth: 3 October 1996 (age 30)
- Place of birth: Toyama, Toyama, Japan
- Height: 1.70 m (5 ft 7 in)
- Position: Midfielder

Team information
- Current team: Kataller Toyama
- Number: 26

Youth career
- –2014: Kataller Toyama U-15/18

Senior career*
Years	Team	Apps	(Gls)
2015–	Kataller Toyama	16	(2)
- * Club domestic league appearances and goals as of 23 February 2016

Junki Mawatari (馬渡隼暉, Mawatari, Junki; born 3 October 1996 in Toyama, Toyama) is a Japanese footballer who plays for Kataller Toyama.

== Club statistics ==
Updated to 23 February 2016.

Club performance			League		Cup		Total	
Season	Club	League	Apps	Goals	Apps	Goals	Apps	Goals
Japan			League		Emperor's Cup		Total	
2015	Kataller Toyama	J3 League	16	2	–		16	2
Career total			16	2	0	0	16	2
