= Yuto Maeda =

Japanese footballer

Yuto Maeda 前田 悠斗
Personal information
- Full name: Yuto Maeda
- Date of birth: November 22, 1994 (age 31)
- Place of birth: Hyogo, Japan
- Height: 1.74 m (5 ft 8 1/2 in)
- Position: Midfielder

Team information
- Current team: FC Osaka
- Number: 22

Youth career
- 2013–2016: Kyoto Sangyo University

Senior career*
Years	Team	Apps	(Gls)
2017–2018	Nagano Parceiro	2	(0)
2019–	FC Osaka		
- * Club domestic league appearances and goals as of 22 February 2019

Yuto Maeda (前田 悠斗, Maeda Yuto; born November 22, 1994) is a Japanese football player. He plays for FC Osaka.

== Career ==
Yuto Maeda joined J3 League club AC Nagano Parceiro in 2017. On June 21, he debuted in Emperor's Cup (v FC Tokyo).

== Club statistics ==
Updated to 22 February 2019.

Club performance			League		Cup		Total	
Season	Club	League	Apps	Goals	Apps	Goals	Apps	Goals
Japan			League		Emperor's Cup		Total	
2017	Nagano Parceiro	J3 League	0	0	2	0	2	0
2018	Nagano Parceiro	J3 League	2	0	2	0	4	0
Total			2	0	4	0	6	0
