= Daisuke Kitahara =

Japanese footballer

Daisuke Kitahara 北原 大奨
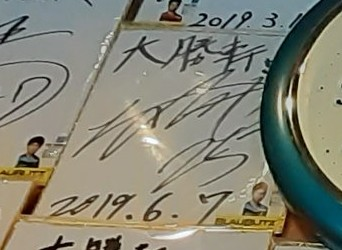
- Autograph in 2019

Personal information
- Full name: Daisuke Kitahara
- Date of birth: April 4, 1994 (age 32)
- Place of birth: Kanagawa, Japan
- Height: 1.78 m (5 ft 10 in)
- Position: Forward

Team information
- Current team: Atletico Suzuka Club
- Number: 14

Youth career
- 2010–2012: Shonan Bellmare

College career
Years	Team	Apps	(Gls)
2013–2016	Tokai University		

Senior career*
Years	Team	Apps	(Gls)
2016–2018	YSCC Yokohama	36	(4)
2019	Blaublitz Akita	13	(1)
2020–2021	Matsue City FC		
2021–2022	Tochigi City FC	4	(0)
2022–2023	FSV Duisburg	5	(0)
2023-2024	Basara Hyogo	15	(2)
2024-	Atletico Suzuka Club	1	(0)
- * Club domestic league appearances and goals as of 21 August 2024 @ 13:43(AEST)

Daisuke Kitahara (北原 大奨, Kitahara Daisuke; born April 4, 1994) is a Japanese football player.

== Club statistics ==
Updated to 23 February 2020.

Club performance			League		Cup		Total	
Season	Club	League	Apps	Goals	Apps	Goals	Apps	Goals
Japan			League		Emperor's Cup		Total	
2016	YSCC Yokohama	J3 League	13	3	–		13	3
2017	YSCC Yokohama	J3 League	9	1	0	0	9	1
2018	YSCC Yokohama	J3 League	14	0	0	0	14	0
2019	Blaublitz Akita	J3 League	13	1	1	0	14	1
Total			49	5	1	0	50	5
