= Taiki Nakashima =

Japanese footballer

Taiki Nakashima 中島大貴
Personal information
- Full name: Taiki Nakashima
- Date of birth: January 17, 1995 (age 31)
- Place of birth: Saga, Japan
- Height: 1.90 m (6 ft 3 in)
- Position: Defender

Youth career
- 2013–2016: Fukuoka University

Senior career*
Years	Team	Apps	(Gls)
2015	Sagan Tosu	0	(0)
2017–2018	Kamatamare Sanuki	36	(1)
2019	Blaublitz Akita	13	(0)
- * Club domestic league appearances and goals as of 22 February 2020

Taiki Nakashima (中島 大貴, Nakashima Taiki; born January 17, 1995) is a retired Japanese football player who last played for Blaublitz Akita.

== Career ==
Taiki Nakashima joined J1 League club; Sagan Tosu in 2015. March 18, he debuted in J.League Cup (v Matsumoto Yamaga FC).

He joined Blaublitz Akita for the 2019 season. The transfer was confirmed on 15 December 2018.

== Career statistics ==
Updated to 22 February 2020.

Appearances and goals by club, season and competition
Club	Season	League			Emperor's Cup		J.League Cup		Total	
Club	Season	Division	Apps	Goals	Apps	Goals	Apps	Goals	Apps	Goals
Sagan Tosu	2015	J1 League	0	0	–		2	0	2	0
Kamatamare Sanuki	2017	J2 League	17	0	1	0	–		18	0
Kamatamare Sanuki	2018	J2 League	19	1	1	0	–		20	1
Blaublitz Akita	2019	J3 League	13	0	1	0	–		14	0
Career total			49	1	3	0	2	0	54	1
