= Kenji Kitawaki =

Japanese footballer

Kenji Kitawaki 北脇健慈
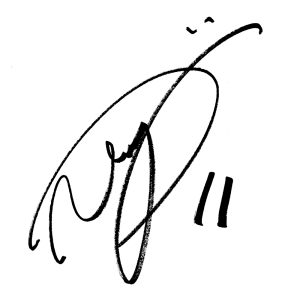

Personal information
- Full name: Kenji Kitawaki
- Date of birth: 15 September 1991 (age 35)
- Place of birth: Tama, Tokyo, Japan
- Height: 1.74 m (5 ft 9 in)
- Position: Forward

Team information
- Current team: Vonds Ichihara
- Number: 15

Youth career
- 1998–2001: Kitakai SC
- 2002–2009: Tokyo Verdy

College career
Years	Team	Apps	(Gls)
2010–2013	Nippon Sport Science University		

Senior career*
Years	Team	Apps	(Gls)
2014–2016	Tokyo Verdy	19	(2)
2015	→ Suzuka Unlimited FC (loan)	5	(3)
2017–2018	YSCC Yokohama	17	(2)
2019-2020	Blaublitz Akita	14	(1)
2021-	Vonds Ichihara	21	(5)
- * Club domestic league appearances and goals as of 21 December 2020

Kenji Kitawaki (北脇健慈, Kitawaki, Kenji; born 15 September 1991 in Tama, Tokyo) is a Japanese footballer who plays for Vonds Ichihara.

== Life ==
Born in Tama, Tokyo, Kitawaki played college football at Nippon Sport Science University before joining Tokyo Verdy in 2014, scoring on his J2 League debut season and spending 2015 on loan at Suzuka Unlimited FC. After leaving Verdy in 2016, he moved to J3 League club YSCC Yokohama, where he scored seven league goals in 30 appearances in 2018, and then spent two seasons with Blaublitz Akita from 2019. He later dropped into the regional leagues with Vonds Ichihara in 2021 and Fukui United FC in 2023, and has played for Fukui in the Emperor's Cup.

== Career statistics ==
Updated to 31 December 2020.

Appearances and goals by club, season and competition
Club	Season	League			Emperor's Cup		Total	
Club	Season	Division	Apps	Goals	Apps	Goals	Apps	Goals
Tokyo Verdy	2014	J2 League	3	1	0	0	3	1
Tokyo Verdy	2015	J2 League	1	0	–		1	0
Suzuka Unlimited FC	2015	JRL (Tokai)	5	3	–		5	3
Tokyo Verdy	2016	J2 League	15	1	2	0	17	1
YSCC Yokohama	2017	J3 League	17	2	0	0	17	2
YSCC Yokohama	2018	J3 League	30	7	2	0	32	7
Blaublitz Akita	2019	J3 League	10	1	1	0	11	1
Blaublitz Akita	2020	J3 League	4	0	2	0	6	0
Career total			85	15	7	0	92	15

== Honours ==
Blaublitz Akita

- J3 League (1): 2020
