= List of J3 League football transfers winter 2022–23 =

Transfer list

This is a list of J3 League transfers made during the winter transfer window of the 2023 season by each club. It went from 6 January to 31 March.

== Azul Claro Numazu ==
Transfers in
Join on	Pos.	Player	Moving from	Transfer type
10 Mar	FW	(Brazil) Igor Gabriel	(Brazil) Tapajós	Loan transfer
Pre-season	GK	(Japan) Kenta Watanabe	(Japan) Kamatamare Sanuki	Free transfer
Pre-season	GK	(Chinese Taipei) Shunkun Tani	(Japan) YSCC Yokohama	Full transfer
Pre-season	DF	(Brazil) Raul Sudati	(Brazil) Avaí FC	Full transfer
Pre-season	DF	(Japan) Yuma Ichikawa	(Japan) Tokyo 23	Full transfer
Pre-season	DF	(Japan) Haruto Kawamae	(Japan) Kochi United	Loan return
Pre-season	DF	(Japan) Koki Inoue	(Japan) Suzuka Point Getters	Loan return
Pre-season	MF	(Japan) Masato Shimokawa	(South Korea) Gimhae FC	Full transfer
Pre-season	MF	(Japan) Kyota Mochii	(Japan) Tokyo Verdy	Loan transfer
Pre-season	MF	(Japan) Keigo Iwasaki	Azul Claro Numazu U18s	Promotion
Pre-season	FW	(Brazil) Mikhael Akatsuka	(Japan) Osaka Sangyo University	Free transfer
Pre-season	FW	(Japan) Hagumi Wada	(Japan) University of Tsukuba	Free transfer
Pre-season	FW	(Japan) Takumi Tsukui	(Japan) Yokohama F. Marinos	Loan transfer
Pre-season	FW	(Japan) Aoi Ando	(Japan) Shimizu S-Pulse	Loan transfer

Transfers out
Leave on	Pos.	Player	Moving to	Transfer type
Pre-season	GK	(Japan) Masataka Nomura	(Japan) Toyama Shinjo	Free transfer
Pre-season	GK	(Japan) Daiki Mitsui	(Japan) Nagoya Grampus	Loan expiration
Pre-season	MF	(Japan) Ryoma Kita	(Japan) FC Gifu	Full transfer
Pre-season	MF	(Japan) Kosei Uryu	(Japan) Verspah Oita	Free transfer
Pre-season	MF	(Japan) Kazuki Kijima	(Japan) Vonds Ichihara	Free transfer
Pre-season	MF	(Vietnam) Bùi Ngọc Long	(Vietnam) Saigon FC	Loan expiration
Pre-season	MF	(Japan) Kazuki Kijima	–	Contract expiration
Pre-season	FW	(Malaysia) Hadi Fayyadh	(Japan) Fagiano Okayama	Loan expiration
Pre-season	FW	(Vietnam) Nguyễn Ngọc Hậu	(Vietnam) Saigon FC	Loan expiration
Pre-season	FW	(Vietnam) Nguyễn Văn Sơn	(Vietnam) Saigon FC	Loan expiration

== Ehime FC ==
Transfers in
Join on	Pos.	Player	Moving from	Transfer type
22 Mar	FW	(Australia) Ben Duncan	(Australia) Central Coast Mariners U23s	Free transfer
Pre-season	GK	(Japan) Kazuma Makiguchi	Ehime FC U18s	Promotion
Pre-season	DF	(Japan) Tatsuya Yamaguchi	(Japan) Tokyo Verdy	Full transfer
Pre-season	DF	(Japan) Yasuhiro Hiraoka	(Japan) Vegalta Sendai	Free transfer
Pre-season	DF	(Japan) Takuma Otake	(Japan) Kashiwa Reysol	Loan transfer
Pre-season	DF	(Japan) Shoi Yoshinaga	(Japan) Omiya Ardija	Loan transfer
Pre-season	DF	(Japan) Haruki Yoshida	(Japan) Kochi United	Loan return
Pre-season	MF	(Japan) Yutaka Soneda	(Japan) Mito HollyHock	Full transfer
Pre-season	MF	(Japan) Shunsuke Kikuchi	(Japan) Omiya Ardija	Free transfer
Pre-season	MF	(Japan) Kazuki Sota	(Japan) Fukuyama City	Full transfer
Pre-season	MF	(Japan) Yuta Fukasawa	(Japan) Kansai University	Free transfer
Pre-season	MF	(Japan) Shunsuke Tanimoto	(Japan) Kansai University WS	Free transfer
Pre-season	MF	(Japan) Yuto Hikida	(Japan) Fagiano Okayama	Loan transfer
Pre-season	MF	(Japan) Shumpei Fukahori	(Japan) Thespakusatsu Gunma	Loan transfer
Pre-season	MF	(Japan) Taiga Ishiura	(Japan) Tokyo Verdy	Loan transfer
Pre-season	FW	(Japan) Toki Yukutomo	Ehime FC U18s	Promotion

Transfers out
Leave on	Pos.	Player	Moving to	Transfer type
Pre-season	GK	(Japan) Yosei Itahashi	(Japan) Sagan Tosu	Loan expiration
Pre-season	DF	(Japan) Naoki Kuriyama	(Singapore) Hougang United	Free transfer
Pre-season	DF	(Japan) Taishi Nishioka	(Japan) Tegevajaro Miyazaki	Full transfer
Pre-season	DF	(Japan) Kenta Uchida	(Japan) Maruyasu Okazaki	Free transfer
Pre-season	DF	(Japan) Daisei Suzuki	(Japan) Tokushima Vortis	Loan expiration
Pre-season	DF	(Japan) Toshiya Takagi	–	Contract expiration
Pre-season	MF	(Japan) Motoki Ohara	(Japan) Sanfrecce Hiroshima	Full transfer
Pre-season	MF	(Japan) Hiroto Tanaka	(Japan) Blaublitz Akita	Free transfer
Pre-season	MF	(Japan) Takashi Kondo	(Japan) Nagano Parceiro	Free transfer
Pre-season	MF	(Japan) Shigeru Yokotani	–	Retirement
Pre-season	MF	(Japan) Ryosuke Maeda	–	Contract expiration
Pre-season	FW	(Japan) Tomoya Osawa	(Japan) Omiya Ardija	Loan expiration
Pre-season	FW	(Japan) Kohei Shin	(Japan) Thespakusatsu Gunma	Loan expiration
Pre-season	FW	(Japan) Makito Yoshida	(Japan) Boso Rovers Kisarazu	Free transfer

== Fukushima United ==
Transfers in
Join on	Pos.	Player	Moving from	Transfer type
Pre-season	GK	(Japan) Akira Fantini	(Japan) Renofa Yamaguchi	Loan return
Pre-season	DF	(Japan) Shota Kobayashi	(Japan) Shonan Bellmare	Free transfer
Pre-season	DF	(Japan) Naoki Suzu	(Japan) Aoyama Gakuin University	Free transfer
Pre-season	DF	(Japan) Takuto Hono	(Japan) Saga Higashi HS	Free transfer
Pre-season	MF	(Japan) Tomohiko Miyazaki	(Japan) Fagiano Okayama	Free transfer
Pre-season	MF	(Japan) Kento Awano	(Japan) Sendai University	Free transfer
Pre-season	FW	(Japan) Kanta Jojo	(Japan) Sanno University	Free transfer
Pre-season	FW	(Japan) Ryo Shiohama	(Japan) Juntendo University	Free transfer
Pre-season	FW	(Japan) Naoto Miki	(Japan) Júbilo Iwata	Loan transfer

Transfers out
Leave on	Pos.	Player	Moving to	Transfer type
Pre-season	GK	(Japan) Jun Anzai	(Japan) Fukui United	Loan transfer
Pre-season	DF	(Japan) Ryota Kitamura	(Japan) Tegevajaro Miyazaki	Free transfer
Pre-season	DF	(Japan) Hideaki Arai	(Japan) Tokyo United	Free transfer
Pre-season	DF	(Japan) Hiroto Yagi	(Japan) Fukui United	Loan transfer
Pre-season	MF	(Japan) Hiroto Morooka	(Japan) Blaublitz Akita	Full transfer
Pre-season	MF	(Japan) Riku Hashimoto	(Japan) SC Sagamihara	Full transfer
Pre-season	MF	(Japan) Hikaru Arai	(Japan) Shonan Bellmare	Loan expiration
Pre-season	MF	(Japan) Katsumi Yusa	–	Contract expiration
Pre-season	FW	(Japan) Hiyu Kazawa	(Japan) Fukui United	Free transfer
Pre-season	FW	(Japan) Ibrahim Junior Kuribara	(Japan) Shimizu S-Pulse	Loan expiration
Pre-season	FW	(Japan) Junya Takahashi	(Japan) Montedio Yamagata	Loan expiration

== Gainare Tottori ==
Transfers in
Join on	Pos.	Player	Moving from	Transfer type
Pre-season	GK	(Japan) Kaito Ioka	(Japan) Vegalta Sendai	Free transfer
Pre-season	GK	(Japan) Ryota Koma	(Japan) Takushoku University	Free transfer
Pre-season	DF	(Japan) Keita Tanaka	(Japan) FC Ryukyu	Free transfer
Pre-season	DF	(Japan) Ryoya Iizumi	(Japan) FC Imabari	Free transfer
Pre-season	DF	(Japan) Hibiki Nishio	Gainare Tottori U18s	Promotion
Pre-season	MF	(Japan) Makoto Fukoin	(Japan) Blaublitz Akita	Free transfer
Pre-season	MF	(Japan) Atsuki Tojo	(Japan) Kokushikan University	Free transfer
Pre-season	MF	(Japan) Taku Ushinohama	(Japan) Kagoshima United	Loan transfer
Pre-season	FW	(Japan) Kentaro Shigematsu	(Japan) Kamatamare Sanuki	Free transfer
Pre-season	FW	(Japan) Yuta Togashi	(Japan) FC Gifu	Free transfer
Pre-season	FW	(Japan) Masaya Yuma	(Japan) Kagura Shimane	Free transfer

Transfers out
Leave on	Pos.	Player	Moving to	Transfer type
Pre-season	GK	(Japan) Ken Tajiri	(Japan) Iwate Grulla Morioka	Free transfer
Pre-season	GK	(Japan) Kengo Fukudome	(Japan) Yonago Genki	Free transfer
Pre-season	DF	(Japan) Yusuke Ishida	(Japan) Iwaki FC	Full transfer
Pre-season	DF	(Japan) Riku Kobayashi	(Japan) FC Tokushima	Free transfer
Pre-season	MF	(Japan) Taiki Arai	(Japan) Fujieda MYFC	Full transfer
Pre-season	MF	(Japan) Naoya Uozato	(Japan) Fujieda MYFC	Full transfer
Pre-season	MF	(Japan) Kazuya Ando	(Japan) FC Imabari	Free transfer
Pre-season	MF	(Japan) Naoya Senoo	(Japan) Vanraure Hachinohe	Free transfer
Pre-season	MF	(Japan) Takeru Kiyonaga	(Australia) Northcote City	Full transfer
Pre-season	MF	(Japan) Meguru Odagaki	–	Contract expiration
Pre-season	MF	(Japan) Yushi Nagashima	–	Retirement
Pre-season	FW	(Japan) Yuya Taguchi	(Japan) FC Gifu	Full transfer
Pre-season	FW	(Japan) Daichi Ishikawa	(Japan) Roasso Kumamoto	Full transfer

== FC Gifu ==
Transfers in
Join on	Pos.	Player	Moving from	Transfer type
15 Mar	DF	(Japan) Hayato Sugita	(Japan) Yokohama FC	Loan transfer
Pre-season	GK	(Japan) Shu Mogi	(Japan) Cerezo Osaka	Free transfer
Pre-season	GK	(Japan) Shotaro Hayashi	(Japan) Tokyo Int. University	Free transfer
Pre-season	DF	(Japan) Genichi Endo	(Japan) Kamatamare Sanuki	Full transfer
Pre-season	DF	(Japan) SteviaEgbus Mikuni	(Japan) Mito HollyHock	Free transfer
Pre-season	DF	(Japan) Kodai Hagino	(Japan) Hosei University	FFree transfer
Pre-season	DF	(Japan) Ippei Hada	(Japan) Toin University of Yokohama	Free transfer
Pre-season	DF	(Japan) Yuki Wada	(Japan) Tokai Gakuen University	Free transfer
Pre-season	MF	(Japan) Ryu Kawakami	(Japan) SC Sagamihara	Free transfer
Pre-season	MF	(Japan) Kensei Ukita	(Japan) SC Sagamihara	Free transfer
Pre-season	MF	(Japan) Ryoma Kita	(Japan) Azul Claro Numazu	Full transfer
Pre-season	MF	(Japan) Tomoya Yokoyama	(Japan) Gifu Kyoritsu University	Free transfer
Pre-season	MF	(Japan) Ryo Kubota	(Japan) Zweigen Kanazawa	Full transfer; Loan made permanent
Pre-season	MF	(Japan) Kazune Kubota	(Japan) Thespakusatsu Gunma	Loan transfer
Pre-season	MF	(Japan) Ryoto Ishizaka	(Japan) Fukui United	Loan return
Pre-season	FW	(Japan) Yuya Taguchi	(Japan) Gainare Tottori	Full transfer
Pre-season	FW	(Japan) Akito Ueno	(Japan) Osaka Univ. of Economics	Free transfer
Pre-season	FW	(Japan) Tsubasa Kusumoto	(Japan) Tokai Gakuen University	Free transfer

Transfers out
Leave on	Pos.	Player	Moving to	Transfer type
Pre-season	GK	(Japan) Michiya Okamoto	(Japan) YSCC Yokohama	Free transfer
Pre-season	GK	(Japan) Kazushige Kirihata	(Japan) Kashiwa Reysol	Loan expiration
Pre-season	DF	(Japan) Natsu Motoishi	(Japan) Fukuyama City	Free transfer
Pre-season	DF	(Japan) Kazuya Okamura	(Japan) Sonio Takamatsu	Free transfer
Pre-season	DF	(Brazil) Henik	(Japan) Tochigi City	Free transfer
Pre-season	DF	(Japan) Wataru Hashimoto	–	Contract expiration
Pre-season	DF	(Brazil) Freire	(Brazil) Grêmio Prudente	Free transfer
Pre-season	DF	(Japan) Tetsuya Funatsu	–	Retirement
Pre-season	DF	(Japan) Kohei Hattori	–	Retirement
Pre-season	DF	(Japan) Arata Koyama	–	Retirement
Pre-season	MF	(Japan) Ryotaro Onishi	(Japan) Roasso Kumamoto	Full transfer
Pre-season	MF	(Japan) Ryohei Yoshihama	–	Contract expiration
Pre-season	MF	(Japan) Daisuke Kikuchi	–	Retirement
Pre-season	MF	(Japan) Takuya Honda	–	Retirement
Pre-season	FW	(Japan) Junki Hata	(Japan) Blaublitz Akita	Full transfer
Pre-season	FW	(Japan) Yuta Togashi	(Japan) Gainare Tottori	Free transfer
Pre-season	FW	(Japan) Daisuke Ishizu	(Japan) Tegevajaro Miyazaki	Free transfer

== Giravanz Kitakyushu ==
Transfers in
Join on	Pos.	Player	Moving from	Transfer type
Pre-season	DF	(Japan) Ryosuke Tada	(Japan) SC Sagamihara	Free transfer
Pre-season	DF	(Japan) Kaoru Yamawaki	(Japan) Doshisha University	Free transfer
Pre-season	DF	(Japan) Yusuke Oishi	(Japan) Kokushikan University	Free transfer
Pre-season	DF	(Japan) Kakeru Sakamoto	(Japan) Tokai University	Free transfer
Pre-season	DF	(Japan) Kota Muramatsu	(Japan) V-Varen Nagasaki	Loan transfer
Pre-season	MF	(Japan) Ryusei Nose	(Japan) Vanraure Hachinohe	Full transfer
Pre-season	MF	(Japan) Yuki Okada	(Japan) Tegevajaro Miyazaki	Full transfer
Pre-season	MF	(Japan) Shoma Takayoshi	(Japan) Toin University of Yokohama	Free transfer
Pre-season	MF	(Japan) Takumi Wakaya	(Japan) Yamanashi Gakuin University	Free transfer
Pre-season	MF	(Japan) Rinpei Okano	(Japan) Nippon Bunri University	Free transfer
Pre-season	FW	(Japan) Ko Seung-jin	(Japan) Nippon Bunri University	Free transfer
Pre-season	FW	(Japan) Raiki Tsubogo	Giravanz Kitakyushu U18s	Promotion

Transfers out
Leave on	Pos.	Player	Moving to	Transfer type
Pre-season	GK	(Japan) Ko Shimura	(Japan) Omiya Ardija	Full transfer; Loan made permanent
Pre-season	DF	(Japan) Takashi Kawano	(Japan) Blaublitz Akita	Full transfer
Pre-season	DF	(Japan) So Fujitani	(Japan) Matsumoto Yamaga	Full transfer
Pre-season	DF	(Japan) Daiki Nakashio	(Japan) Yokohama FC	Loan expiration
Pre-season	DF	(Japan) Kotaro Fujiwara	–	Retirement
Pre-season	DF	(Japan) Takuya Nagata	–	Retirement
Pre-season	MF	(Japan) Takeaki Harigaya	(Japan) Júbilo Iwata	Loan expiration
Pre-season	MF	(Japan) Yasufumi Nishimura	(Japan) Shimizu S-Pulse	Loan expiration
Pre-season	MF	(Japan) Mitsunari Musaka	–	Retirement
Pre-season	FW	(Japan) Ryo Sato	(Japan) Thespakusatsu Gunma	Full transfer
Pre-season	FW	(Japan) Yuya Takazawa	(Japan) Oita Trinita	Loan expiration
Pre-season	FW	(Japan) Zen Cardona	–	Contract expiration

== FC Imabari ==
Transfers in
Join on	Pos.	Player	Moving from	Transfer type
Pre-season	GK	(Spain) Jon Ander Serantes	(Spain) UD Logroñés	Free transfer
Pre-season	GK	(Japan) Haruhiko Takimoto	(Japan) Kashiwa Reysol	Free transfer
Pre-season	GK	(Japan) Genta Ito	(Japan) Vissel Kobe	Free transfer
Pre-season	DF	(Japan) Nagisa Sakurauchi	(Japan) Vissel Kobe	Full transfer
Pre-season	DF	(Japan) Hiroshi Futami	(Japan) V-Varen Nagasaki	Full transfer
Pre-season	DF	(Japan) Tatsuya Shirai	(Japan) SC Sagamihara	Full transfer
Pre-season	DF	(Japan) Hayato Teruyama	(Japan) Vegalta Sendai	Free transfer
Pre-season	DF	(Japan) Ryota Ichihara	(Japan) Fukuyama City	Loan return
Pre-season	MF	(Japan) Hikaru Arai	(Japan) Shonan Bellmare	Free transfer
Pre-season	MF	(Japan) Kazuya Ando	(Japan) Gainare Tottori	Free transfer
Pre-season	MF	(Japan) Yuma Matsumoto	(Japan) Kataller Toyama	Full transfer
Pre-season	FW	(Brazil) Dudu	(Japan) Machida Zelvia	Free transfer
Pre-season	FW	(Japan) Ryoga Masuda	(Japan) Nippon SS University	Free transfer

Transfers out
Leave on	Pos.	Player	Moving to	Transfer type
Pre-season	GK	(Japan) Shinji Okada	(Japan) Nara Club	Free transfer
Pre-season	GK	(Japan) Shu Mogi	(Japan) Cerezo Osaka	Loan expiration
Pre-season	GK	(South Korea) Lee Do-hyung	–	Contract expiration
Pre-season	DF	(Japan) Tomoya Ando	(Japan) Oita Trinita	Full transfer
Pre-season	DF	(Japan) Ryoya Iizumi	(Japan) Gainare Tottori	Free transfer
Pre-season	DF	(Japan) Noriki Fuke	(Japan) Tokushima Vortis	Loan expiration
Pre-season	DF	(Japan) Yuichi Komano	–	Retirement
Pre-season	DF	(Japan) Junya Hosokawa	–	Retirement
Pre-season	MF	(Japan) Takuya Shimamura	(Japan) Roasso Kumamoto	Free transfer
Pre-season	MF	(Japan) Sho Fukuda	(Japan) YSCC Yokohama	Free transfer
Pre-season	MF	(Japan) Kazuki Okayama	(Japan) Veroskronos Tsuno	Free transfer
Pre-season	MF	(Japan) Seita Murai	–	Contract expiration
Pre-season	FW	(Japan) Kanta Chiba	(Japan) Shimizu S-Pulse	Loan expiration
Pre-season	FW	(Australia) Mohamed Adam	(Australia) Melbourne Sharks	Free transfer

== Iwate Grulla Morioka ==
Transfers in
Join on	Pos.	Player	Moving from	Transfer type
Pre-season	GK	(Japan) Kenta Tanno	(Japan) Kawasaki Frontale	Free transfer
Pre-season	GK	(Japan) Ken Tajiri	(Japan) Gainare Tottori	Free transfer
Pre-season	DF	(Japan) Masakazu Tashiro	(Japan) Omiya Ardija	Free transfer
Pre-season	DF	(Japan) Ryoma Ishida	(Japan) SC Sagamihara	Full transfer
Pre-season	DF	(North Korea) Ri Yong-jik	(Japan) FC Ryukyu	Full transfer
Pre-season	DF	(Japan) Shota Shimogami	(Japan) Kyushu Sangyo University	Free transfer
Pre-season	MF	(Hong Kong) Au Yeung Yiu Chung	(Japan) YSCC Yokohama	Free transfer
Pre-season	MF	(Japan) Koki Mizuno	(Japan) Atsugi Hayabusa	Free transfer
Pre-season	MF	(Japan) Koki Matsubara	(Japan) Meiji University	Free transfer
Pre-season	FW	(Japan) Ren Fujimura	(Japan) Consadole Sapporo	Full transfer
Pre-season	FW	(Japan) Miyu Sato	(Japan) Kanagawa University	Free transfer
Pre-season	FW	(Brazil) Douglas Oliveira	(Japan) Consadole Sapporo	Loan transfer

Transfers out
Leave on	Pos.	Player	Moving to	Transfer type
Pre-season	GK	(Japan) Kenta Matsuyama	(Japan) Kagoshima United	Full transfer
Pre-season	GK	(Japan) Taishi Brandon Nozawa	(Japan) FC Tokyo	Loan expiration
Pre-season	GK	(Japan) Nobuyuki Abe	–	Retirement
Pre-season	DF	(Japan) Issei Tone	(Japan) Kagoshima United	Full transfer
Pre-season	DF	(Japan) Yusuke Muta	(Japan) FC Ryukyu	Free transfer
Pre-season	DF	(Japan) Masahito Onoda	–	Contract expiration
Pre-season	DF	(Japan) Taisuke Nakamura	–	Retirement
Pre-season	MF	(Japan) Keita Ishii	(Japan) Criacao Shinjuku	Full transfer
Pre-season	MF	(Japan) Kosei Wakimoto	(Japan) Kataller Toyama	Free transfer
Pre-season	MF	(Japan) Yohei Okuyama	(Japan) Machida Zelvia	Full transfer
Pre-season	MF	(Japan) Masaomi Nakano	(Japan) MIO Biwako Shiga	Free transfer
Pre-season	MF	(Brazil) Lucas Morelatto	(China) Nantong Zhiyun	Free transfer
Pre-season	MF	(Japan) Sodai Hasukawa	(Japan) FC Tokyo	Loan expiration
Pre-season	MF	(Japan) Hayata Komatsu	(Japan) Montedio Yamagata	Loan expiration
Pre-season	MF	(Japan) Ren Yamakawa	–	Contract expiration
Pre-season	FW	(Brazil) Brenner	(Thailand) PT Prachuap	Free transfer
Pre-season	FW	(Japan) Yuki Shikama	(Japan) Aries Tokyo	Free transfer
Pre-season	FW	(Japan) Kaito Suzuki	(Japan) Vonds Ichihara	Loan transfer
Pre-season	FW	(South Korea) Kim Jong-min	(South Korea) Cheonan City	Free transfer
Pre-season	FW	(North Korea) Han Yong-thae	–	Contract expiration

== Kagoshima United ==
Transfers in
Join on	Pos.	Player	Moving from	Transfer type
Pre-season	GK	(Japan) Kenta Matsuyama	(Japan) Iwate Grulla Morioka	Full transfer
Pre-season	GK	(Japan) Issei Ouchi	(Japan) Yokohama FC	Loan transfer
Pre-season	DF	(Japan) Issei Tone	(Japan) Iwate Grulla Morioka	Full transfer
Pre-season	DF	(Japan) Takahiro Horie	(Japan) Hosei University	Free transfer
Pre-season	MF	(Japan) Kazuki Chibu	(Japan) Tegevajaro Miyazaki	Full transfer
Pre-season	MF	(Japan) Takumi Yamaguchi	(Japan) NIFS Kanoya	Full transfer
Pre-season	FW	(Japan) Noriaki Fujimoto	(Japan) Vissel Kobe	Free transfer
Pre-season	FW	(Japan) Shota Suzuki	(Japan) Iwaki FC	Free transfer
Pre-season	FW	(Japan) Shuntaro Kawabe	(Japan) YSCC Yokohama	Full transfer
Pre-season	FW	(Japan) Jin Hanato	(Japan) Tokyo Verdy	Free transfer
Pre-season	FW	(Japan) Seiya Take	Kagoshima United U18s	Promotion

Transfers out
Leave on	Pos.	Player	Moving to	Transfer type
Pre-season	GK	(Japan) Shogo Onishi	(Japan) Vanraure Hachinohe	Full transfer
Pre-season	GK	(Japan) Fuma Shirasaka	(Japan) Yokohama F. Marinos	Loan expiration
Pre-season	DF	(Japan) Kazuya Sunamori	(Japan) Nagano Parceiro	Free transfer
Pre-season	DF	(Japan) Shintaro Ihara	(Japan) Tegevajaro Miyazaki	Free transfer
Pre-season	DF	(Japan) Mikita Eto	(Japan) Veroskronos Tsuno	Free transfer
Pre-season	DF	(Japan) Kosei Hamaguchi	(Japan) Veroskronos Tsuno	Free transfer
Pre-season	DF	(Japan) Kenya Onodera	(Japan) Tochigi SC	Loan expiration
Pre-season	MF	(Japan) Kohei Hattanda	(Japan) J-Lease FC	Free transfer
Pre-season	MF	(Japan) Taku Ushinohama	(Japan) Gainare Tottori	Loan transfer
Pre-season	MF	(Japan) Kai Ishitsu	(Japan) FC Tokushima	Loan transfer

== Kamatamare Sanuki ==
Transfers in
Join on	Pos.	Player	Moving from	Transfer type
Pre-season	GK	(Japan) Kaisei Matsubara	Kamatamare Sanuki U18s	Promotion
Pre-season	DF	(Japan) Yudai Okuda	(Japan) Tokushima Vortis	Free transfer
Pre-season	DF	(Japan) Takashi Kanai	(Japan) FC Ryukyu	Free transfer
Pre-season	DF	(Japan) Kei Munechika	(Japan) YSCC Yokohama	Full transfer
Pre-season	DF	(Japan) Takumi Narasaka	(Japan) Machida Zelvia	Loan transfer
Pre-season	MF	(Japan) Nao Eguchi	(Japan) Blaublitz Akita	Free transfer
Pre-season	MF	(Japan) Yuto Mori	(Japan) Mito HollyHock	Full transfer
Pre-season	MF	(Japan) Gentaro Yoshida	(Japan) Sakushin Gakuin University	Free transfer
Pre-season	MF	(Japan) Naoki Takahashi	(Japan) Kokushikan University	FFree transfer
Pre-season	MF	(Japan) Shunji Takemura	(Japan) Rissho University	Free transfer
Pre-season	FW	(Japan) Kaima Akahoshi	(Japan) Kochi United	Free transfer
Pre-season	FW	(Japan) Soshi Iwagishi	(Japan) Doshisha University	Free transfer
Pre-season	FW	(Japan) Ryohei Torigai	(Japan) Rissho University	Free transfer
Pre-season	FW	(Japan) Himan Morimoto	(Japan) Tiamo Hirakata	Loan transfer

Transfers out
Leave on	Pos.	Player	Moving to	Transfer type
Pre-season	GK	(Japan) Kenta Watanabe	(Japan) Azul Claro Numazu	Free transfer
Pre-season	DF	(Japan) Mizuki Uchida	(Japan) Machida Zelvia	Full transfer
Pre-season	DF	(Japan) Genichi Endo	(Japan) FC Gifu	Full transfer
Pre-season	DF	(Japan) Wataru Sasaki	(Japan) Maruyasu Okazaki	Full transfer
Pre-season	DF	(Japan) Naoya Matsumoto	(Japan) J-Lease FC	Free transfer
Pre-season	DF	(Japan) Takaharu Nishino	–	Contract expiration
Pre-season	DF	(Japan) Naoya Matsumoto	–	Contract expiration
Pre-season	DF	(Japan) Yushi Mizobuchi	–	Retirement
Pre-season	MF	(Japan) Kenta Sawada	(Japan) Fukuyama City	Free transfer
Pre-season	MF	(Japan) Yuga Watanabe	(Australia) Brunswick City	Free transfer
Pre-season	MF	(Japan) Masataka Nishimoto	–	Contract expiration
Pre-season	FW	(Japan) Kohei Matsumoto	(Japan) Ventforet Kofu	Full transfer
Pre-season	FW	(Japan) Kakeru Aoto	(Japan) Tegevajaro Miyazaki	Free transfer
Pre-season	FW	(Japan) Yusuke Yoshii	(Japan) YSCC Yokohama	Free transfer
Pre-season	FW	(Japan) Shunta Nakamura	(Japan) Montedio Yamagata	Loan expiration
Pre-season	FW	(Japan) Mark Ajay Kurita	–	Contract expiration
Pre-season	FW	(Japan) Kentaro Shigematsu	(Japan) Gainare Tottori	Free transfer
Pre-season	FW	(Japan) Kakeru Aoto	–	Contract expiration
Pre-season	FW	(Japan) Ryoto Kamiya	–	Contract expiration
Pre-season	FW	(Kenya) Ismael Dunga	(Japan) Sagan Tosu	Loan expiration

== Kataller Toyama ==
Transfers in
Join on	Pos.	Player	Moving from	Transfer type
Pre-season	GK	(Japan) Takahiro Shibasaki	(Japan) SC Sagamihara	Free transfer
Pre-season	DF	(Japan) Ryusei Shimodo	(Japan) Vanraure Hachinohe	Full transfer
Pre-season	DF	(Japan) Daichi Omori	(Singapore) Albirex Niigata	Free transfer
Pre-season	DF	(Japan) Atsushi Nabeta	(Japan) Toin University of Yokohama	Free transfer
Pre-season	MF	(Japan) Kosei Wakimoto	(Japan) Iwate Grulla Morioka	Free transfer
Pre-season	MF	(Japan) Hiroyuki Tsubokawa	(Japan) Nagano Parceiro	Free transfer
Pre-season	MF	(Japan) Takumi Ito	(Japan) Tokai Gakuin University	Free transfer

Transfers out
Leave on	Pos.	Player	Moving to	Transfer type
Pre-season	GK	(Japan) Genki Yamada	(Japan) Renofa Yamaguchi	Loan expiration
Pre-season	GK	(Japan) Yohei Nishibe	–	Retirement
Pre-season	DF	(Japan) Kazuma Takayama	(Singapore) Hougang United	Free transfer
Pre-season	DF	(Japan) Taiyo Hama	(Japan) Consadole Sapporo	Loan expiration
Pre-season	DF	(Japan) Takuma Shikayama	–	Contract expiration
Pre-season	DF	(Japan) Shoma Kamata	–	Retirement
Pre-season	MF	(Japan) Yuma Matsumoto	(Japan) FC Imabari	Full transfer
Pre-season	MF	(Japan) Yuya Himeno	(Japan) Vanraure Hachinohe	Free transfer
Pre-season	MF	(Japan) Shuto Hori	(Japan) Tokyo Musashino United	Loan transfer
Pre-season	MF	(China) Chen Binbin	(China) Shanghai Port	Loan expiration
Pre-season	FW	(Brazil) Luís Henrique	–	Contract expiration

== Matsumoto Yamaga ==
Transfers in
Join on	Pos.	Player	Moving from	Transfer type
Pre-season	DF	(Japan) So Fujitani	(Japan) Giravanz Kitakyushu	Full transfer
Pre-season	DF	(Japan) Ko Shimura	(Japan) Fuji University	Free transfer
Pre-season	DF	(Japan) Yuya Fujimoto	(Japan) Kanto Gakuin University	Free transfer
Pre-season	MF	(Japan) Kohei Kiyama	(Japan) Fagiano Okayama	Free transfer
Pre-season	MF	(Japan) Mao Hamana	(Japan) Matsumoto University	Free transfer
Pre-season	MF	(Japan) Ryuji Kokubu	(Japan) Osaka Gakuin University	Free transfer
Pre-season	MF	(Japan) Shusuke Yonehara	(Japan) Ventforet Kofu	Loan return
Pre-season	MF	(Japan) Kaiga Murakoshi	(Japan) ReinMeer Aomori	Loan return
Pre-season	FW	(Brazil) Lucas Rian	(Brazil) Falcon FC	Full transfer
Pre-season	FW	(Japan) Naoto Arai	(Japan) Kanagawa University	Free transfer
Pre-season	FW	(Japan) Yuta Taki	(Japan) Shimizu S-Pulse	Loan transfer
Pre-season	FW	(Japan) Kunitomo Suzuki	(Japan) Thespakusatsu Gunma	Loan return
Pre-season	FW	(Japan) Sora Tanaka	Matsumoto Yamaga U18s	Promotion

Transfers out
Leave on	Pos.	Player	Moving to	Transfer type
Pre-season	DF	(Japan) Haruki Mitsuda	(Japan) Vanraure Hachinohe	Free transfer
Pre-season	DF	(Japan) Yuya Ono	(Japan) Nagano Parceiro	Free transfer
Pre-season	DF	(Japan) Paulo Junichi Tanaka	(Japan) Tochigi City	Free transfer
Pre-season	DF	(Japan) Hayuma Tanaka	–	Retirement
Pre-season	DF	(Japan) Michihiro Yasuda	–	Retirement
Pre-season	MF	(Japan) Kazuhiro Sato	(Japan) Ventforet Kofu	Full transfer
Pre-season	MF	(Japan) Ryo Toyama	(Japan) Tokushima Vortis	Full transfer
Pre-season	MF	(Japan) Masaya Yoshida	(Japan) ReinMeer Aomori	Free transfer
Pre-season	MF	(Japan) Manato Yamada	(Australia) Eltham Redbacks	Free transfer
Pre-season	MF	(Japan) Riku Nakayama	(Japan) Ventforet Kofu	Loan expiration
Pre-season	FW	(Japan) Ayumu Yokoyama	(Japan) Sagan Tosu	Full transfer
Pre-season	FW	(Brazil) Lucão	(Japan) Fagiano Okayama	Free transfer
Pre-season	FW	(Japan) Akira Toshima	(Japan) Tochigi City	Free transfer

== Nagano Parceiro ==
Transfers in
Join on	Pos.	Player	Moving from	Transfer type
Pre-season	GK	(Japan) Taro Hamada	(Japan) Oita Trinita	Loan transfer
Pre-season	DF	(Japan) Kazuya Sunamori	(Japan) Kagoshima United	Free transfer
Pre-season	DF	(Japan) Yuya Ono	(Japan) Matsumoto Yamaga	Free transfer
Pre-season	DF	(Japan) Yusuke Nishida	(Japan) Yokohama F. Marinos	Loan transfer
Pre-season	DF	(Japan) Maaya Sako	(Japan) Tokyo Verdy	Loan transfer
Pre-season	DF	(Japan) Yuta Suzuki	Nagano Parceiro U18s	Promotion
Pre-season	MF	(Japan) Takashi Kondo	(Japan) Ehime FC	Free transfer
Pre-season	MF	(Japan) Teru Ando	(Japan) Tochigi City	Free transfer
Pre-season	MF	(Japan) Takumi Niwa	(Japan) Waseda University	Free transfer
Pre-season	MF	(Japan) Arima Aoki	(Japan) Matsumoto University	Free transfer
Pre-season	MF	(Japan) Shoma Otoizumi	(Japan) Mito HollyHock	Loan transfer
Pre-season	MF	(Japan) Yasufumi Nishimura	(Japan) Shimizu S-Pulse	Loan transfer
Pre-season	FW	(Japan) Kohei Shin	(Japan) Thespakusatsu Gunma	Free transfer
Pre-season	FW	(Japan) Rei Kihara	(Japan) Urawa Red Diamonds	Loan transfer
Pre-season	FW	(Japan) Kento Takakubo	(Japan) FC Tokushima	Loan return

Transfers out
Leave on	Pos.	Player	Moving to	Transfer type
Pre-season	GK	(Japan) Issei Ouchi	(Japan) Yokohama FC	Loan expiration
Pre-season	DF	(Japan) Kento Kawata	(Japan) Vonds Ichihara	Free transfer
Pre-season	DF	(Japan) Yui Shikida	(Japan) Tokyo 23	Loan transfer
Pre-season	DF	(Japan) Daichi Inui	(Japan) Tonan Maebashi	Free transfer
Pre-season	DF	(Japan) Carlos Duke	(Japan) Fagiano Okayama	Loan expiration
Pre-season	MF	(Japan) Takuma Mizutani	(Japan) Blaublitz Akita	Full transfer
Pre-season	MF	(Japan) Hiroyuki Tsubokawa	(Japan) Kataller Toyama	Free transfer
Pre-season	MF	(Japan) Kakeru Suminaga	(Japan) ReinMeer Aomori	Free transfer
Pre-season	MF	(Japan) Kazuki Yamaguchi	(Japan) ReinMeer Aomori	Free transfer
Pre-season	MF	(Japan) Hiroshi Azuma	–	Retirement
Pre-season	MF	(Japan) Kanta Makino	–	Retirement
Pre-season	FW	(Japan) Tsubasa Sano	(Japan) Criacao Shinjuku	Free transfer
Pre-season	FW	(Japan) Takuya Miyamoto	(Japan) Fujieda MYFC	Loan expiration

== Nara Club ==
Transfers in
Join on	Pos.	Player	Moving from	Transfer type
Pre-season	GK	(Japan) Shinji Okada	(Japan) FC Imabari	Free transfer
Pre-season	DF	(Japan) Daisei Suzuki	(Japan) Tokushima Vortis	Free transfer
Pre-season	MF	(Japan) Kensei Nakashima	(Japan) SC Sagamihara	Free transfer
Pre-season	MF	(Japan) Megumu Nishida	(Japan) Tegevajaro Miyazaki	Free transfer
Pre-season	MF	(Japan) Hayato Horiuchi	(Japan) Honda FC	Free transfer
Pre-season	MF	(Japan) Ryuta Takahashi	(Japan) Nara Club	Loan transfer
Pre-season	FW	(Japan) Tatsuma Sakai	(Japan) Maruyasu Okazaki	Free transfer

Transfers out
Leave on	Pos.	Player	Moving to	Transfer type
Pre-season	GK	(Japan) Yuki Kaneko	(Japan) Hokkaido Tokachi Sky Earth	Free transfer
Pre-season	DF	(Japan) Soichi Tanaka	–	Retirement
Pre-season	MF	(Japan) Yusuke Kaneko	(Japan) Verspah Oita	Free transfer
Pre-season	MF	(Japan) Kodai Nagashima	(Japan) Verspah Oita	Free transfer
Pre-season	MF	(Japan) Rin Morita	(Japan) Tokushima Vortis	Loan expiration
Pre-season	MF	(Japan) Jiei Katayama	–	Contract expiration
Pre-season	FW	(Japan) Sachio Hamada	–	Contract expiration

== FC Osaka ==
Transfers in
Join on	Pos.	Player	Moving from	Transfer type
11 Mar	DF	(Japan) Keita Matsuda	(Japan) Mito HollyHock	Loan transfer
10 Mar	MF	(Brazil) Maykon Douglas	(Brazil) Vitória	Loan transfer
Pre-season	GK	(Japan) Kazuki Hattori	(Japan) Vanraure Hachinohe	Free transfer
Pre-season	DF	(Japan) Takeru Itakura	(Japan) Vanraure Hachinohe	Full transfer
Pre-season	DF	(Japan) Takumi Sakai	(Japan) ReinMeer Aomori	Full transfer
Pre-season	DF	(Japan) Yuki Yamada	(Japan) Biwako Seikei S. College	Full transfer
Pre-season	MF	(Japan) Takaya Yoshinare	(Japan) Cerezo Osaka	Free transfer
Pre-season	FW	(Japan) Rui Tone	(Japan) Verspah Oita	Free transfer
Pre-season	FW	(Japan) Talla Ndao	(Japan) Yokohama F. Marinos	Free transfer
Pre-season	FW	(Japan) Takumi Shimada	(Japan) Vanraure Hachinohe	Free transfer
Pre-season	FW	(Japan) Taichi Takeda	(Japan) Tokushima Vortis	Full transfer; Loan made permanent
Pre-season	FW	(Brazil) João Victor	(Brazil) Ceará SC	Loan transfer
Pre-season	FW	(Japan) Daigo Furukawa	(Japan) Iwaki FC	Loan transfer

Transfers out
Leave on	Pos.	Player	Moving to	Transfer type
Pre-season	GK	(Japan) Yuitaro Yasuda	(Japan) J-Lease FC	Free transfer
Pre-season	GK	(South Korea) Kim Soo-han	–	Contract expiration
Pre-season	DF	(Japan) Shunsuke Yamazaki	–	Contract expiration
Pre-season	DF	(Japan) Kaito Omomo	–	Retirement
Pre-season	MF	(Japan) Shingo Moriyama	(Japan) Nobeoka Agata	Full transfer
Pre-season	MF	(Japan) Dai Takahashi	(Japan) Tokyo 23	Full transfer
Pre-season	MF	(Brazil) Gabriel Pires	(Brazil) Cianorte FC	Full transfer
Pre-season	MF	(Japan) Taiga Yoshida	(Japan) Vonds Ichihara	Full transfer; Loan made permanent
Pre-season	MF	(Japan) Yuto Maeda	–	Retirement
Pre-season	FW	(Japan) Junya Goto	(Japan) Hokkaido Tokachi Sky Earth	Full transfer
Pre-season	FW	(Japan) Reo Ino	(Japan) Veroskronos Tsuno	Full transfer
Pre-season	FW	(Japan) Tomoya Fukumoto	(Japan) Fagiano Okayama	Loan expiration
Pre-season	FW	(Japan) Junta Nagai	–	Contract expiration

== FC Ryukyu ==
Transfers in
Join on	Pos.	Player	Moving from	Transfer type
17 Mar	DF	(Japan) Takahiro Yanagi	Unattached	Free transfer
Pre-season	GK	(South Korea) Jeon Ji-wan	(South Korea) Jeonbuk Hyundai Motors	Loan transfer
Pre-season	DF	(South Korea) Cho Eun-su	(South Korea) Jeonnam Dragons	Full transfer
Pre-season	DF	(Japan) Takayuki Takayasu	(Japan) Zweigen Kanazawa	Free transfer
Pre-season	DF	(Japan) Yusuke Muta	(Japan) Iwate Grulla Morioka	Free transfer
Pre-season	DF	(Japan) Keiji Kagiyama	(Japan) Ococias Kyoto	Free transfer
Pre-season	DF	(Japan) Ryota Araki	(Japan) Chuo University	Free transfer
Pre-season	DF	(Japan) Yuri Mori	(Japan) University of Tsukuba	Free transfer
Pre-season	DF	(Japan) Shusei Yamauchi	(Japan) Kwansei Gakuin; University	Free transfer
Pre-season	MF	(Japan) Sho Iwamoto	(Japan) University of Tsukuba	Free transfer
Pre-season	MF	(Japan) Sho Hiramatsu	(Japan) Shonan Bellmare	Loan transfer
Pre-season	MF	(Japan) Rin Morita	(Japan) Tokushima Vortis	Loan transfer
Pre-season	MF	(Japan) Jitsuki Tsuha	FC Ryukyu U18s	Promotion
Pre-season	FW	(Japan) Haruto Shirai	(Japan) Fagiano Okayama	Free transfer
Pre-season	FW	(Japan) Mu Kanazaki	(Japan) Oita Trinita	Free transfer
Pre-season	FW	(Japan) Shiryu Fujiwara	(Japan) Tokushima Vortis	Loan transfer

Transfers out
Leave on	Pos.	Player	Moving to	Transfer type
Pre-season	GK	(Japan) Kosuke Inose	(Japan) SC Sagamihara	Full transfer
Pre-season	DF	(Japan) Keigo Numata	(Japan) Renofa Yamaguchi	Free transfer
Pre-season	DF	(Japan) Ryohei Okazaki	(Japan) Tochigi SC	Full transfer
Pre-season	DF	(Japan) Keita Tanaka	(Japan) Gainare Tottori	Free transfer
Pre-season	DF	(North Korea) Ri Yong-jik	(Japan) Iwate Grulla Morioka	Full transfer
Pre-season	DF	(Japan) Takashi Kanai	(Japan) Kamatamare Sanuki	Free transfer
Pre-season	DF	(Japan) Yusuke Murase	(Japan) Maruyasu Okazaki	Free transfer
Pre-season	DF	(Japan) Rio Omori	(Japan) FC Tokyo	Loan expiration
Pre-season	DF	(Japan) So Nakagawa	(Japan) Júbilo Iwata	Loan expiration
Pre-season	DF	(Japan) Reo Yamashita	–	Retirement
Pre-season	MF	(Japan) Sho Sawada	(Portugal) Portimonense SC U23s	Full transfer
Pre-season	MF	(Japan) Ren Ikeda	(Japan) Oita Trinita	Full transfer
Pre-season	MF	(Japan) Yuki Omoto	(Japan) Roasso Kumamoto	Full transfer
Pre-season	MF	(Thailand) Sittichok Paso	(Thailand) Chonburi	Loan expiration
Pre-season	MF	(Spain) Álex Barrera	–	Contract expiration
Pre-season	MF	(Japan) Kohei Kato	(Montenegro) FK Jezero	Free transfer
Pre-season	MF	(Japan) Kazumasa Uesato	–	Retirement
Pre-season	FW	(Japan) Yuki Kusano	(Japan) Yokohama FC	Loan expiration
Pre-season	FW	(Japan) Shinya Uehara	–	Retirement

== SC Sagamihara ==
Transfers in
Join on	Pos.	Player	Moving from	Transfer type
Pre-season	GK	(Japan) Kosuke Inose	(Japan) FC Ryukyu	Full transfer
Pre-season	GK	(Japan) Takahiro Koga	(Singapore) Albirex Niigata (S)	Free transfer
Pre-season	DF	(Japan) Carlos Duke	(Japan) Fagiano Okayama	Free transfer
Pre-season	DF	(Japan) Hayato Nukui	(Japan) Fujieda MYFC	Free transfer
Pre-season	DF	(Japan) Ko Watahiki	(Japan) Tegevajaro Miyazaki	Free transfer
Pre-season	DF	(Japan) Daisuke Kato	(Japan) Briobecca Urayasu	Full transfer
Pre-season	DF	(Japan) Shuhei Kunihiro	(Japan) Shibuya City	Free transfer
Pre-season	DF	(Japan) Yuto Minakuchi	(Japan) Chukyo University	Free transfer
Pre-season	DF	(Japan) Ryoji Yamashita	(Japan) Takushoku University	Free transfer
Pre-season	MF	(Japan) Riku Hashimoto	(Japan) Fukushima United	Full transfer
Pre-season	MF	(Japan) Rio Yoshitake	(Japan) Nobeoka Agata	Free transfer
Pre-season	MF	(Japan) Justin Toshiki Kinjo	(Japan) Vonds Ichihara	Full transfer
Pre-season	MF	(Japan) Keisuke Ito	(Japan) Toyo University	Free transfer
Pre-season	MF	(Japan) Kosei Makiyama	(Japan) Kokushikan University	Free transfer
Pre-season	MF	(Japan) Ryu Wakabayashi	(Japan) Hosei University	Free transfer
Pre-season	MF	(Japan) Rikuto Sano	(Japan) Hosei University	Free transfer
Pre-season	MF	(Japan) Takumi Nishiyama	(Japan) Tokai University	Free transfer
Pre-season	FW	(Japan) Ibrahim Junior Kuribara	(Japan) Shimizu S-Pulse	Free transfer
Pre-season	FW	(Japan) Akira Matsuzawa	(Japan) Tokyo Musashino United	Full transfer
Pre-season	FW	(Japan) Taira Maeda	(Japan) Toyo University	Free transfer
Pre-season	FW	(Japan) Kaito Satori	(Japan) Toin University of Yokohama	Free transfer

Transfers out
Leave on	Pos.	Player	Moving to	Transfer type
Pre-season	GK	(Japan) Kentaro Kakoi	(Japan) Blaublitz Akita	Free transfer
Pre-season	GK	(Japan) Takahiro Shibasaki	(Japan) Kataller Toyama	Free transfer
Pre-season	DF	(Japan) Ryosuke Tada	(Japan) Giravanz Kitakyushu	Free transfer
Pre-season	DF	(Japan) Tatsuya Shirai	(Japan) FC Imabari	Free transfer
Pre-season	DF	(Japan) Ryoma Ishida	(Japan) Iwate Grulla Morioka	Full transfer
Pre-season	DF	(Japan) Kodai Minoda	(Japan) Shonan Bellmare	Loan expiration
Pre-season	DF	(Japan) Yudai Fujiwara	(Japan) Urawa Red Diamonds	Loan expiration
Pre-season	DF	(Japan) Ryuya Fukushima	(Japan) Urawa Red Diamonds	Loan expiration
Pre-season	DF	(Japan) Yukuto Omoya	(Japan) Tochigi SC	Loan expiration
Pre-season	DF	(Japan) Daisuke Watabe	–	Retirement
Pre-season	DF	(Japan) Jiro Kamata	–	Retirement
Pre-season	DF	(Japan) Yasumasa Kawasaki	–	Retirement
Pre-season	DF	(Japan) Hiroki Mizumoto	–	Retirement
Pre-season	MF	(Japan) Kaoru Takayama	(Chinese Taipei) Taichung Futuro	Full transfer
Pre-season	MF	(Japan) Ryu Kawakami	(Japan) FC Gifu	Free transfer
Pre-season	MF	(Japan) Kensei Ukita	(Japan) FC Gifu	Free transfer
Pre-season	MF	(Japan) Kensei Nakashima	(Japan) Nara Club	Free transfer
Pre-season	MF	(Japan) Takahide Umebachi	(Australia) Sutherland Sharks	Free transfer
Pre-season	MF	(Japan) Shogo Nakahara	(Japan) Hokkaido Tokachi Sky Earth	Free transfer
Pre-season	MF	(Japan) Yuan Matsuhashi	(Japan) Tokyo Verdy	Loan expiration
Pre-season	MF	(Japan) Kyota Mochii	(Japan) Tokyo Verdy	Loan expiration
Pre-season	MF	(Japan) Jungo Fujimoto	–	Retirement
Pre-season	FW	(Japan) Takayuki Funayama	(Japan) ReinMeer Aomori	Free transfer
Pre-season	FW	(Japan) Leon Nozawa	(Japan) FC Tokyo	Loan expiration

== Tegevajaro Miyazaki ==
Transfers in
Join on	Pos.	Player	Moving from	Transfer type
Pre-season	GK	(Japan) Kokoro Aoki	(Japan) Juntendo University	Free transfer
Pre-season	DF	(Japan) Taishi Nishioka	(Japan) Ehime FC	Full transfer
Pre-season	DF	(Japan) Ryota Kitamura	(Japan) Fukushima United	Free transfer
Pre-season	DF	(Japan) Shintaro Ihara	(Japan) Kagoshima United	Free transfer
Pre-season	MF	(Japan) Sota Higashide	(Japan) Roasso Kumamoto	Free transfer
Pre-season	MF	(Japan) Hikaru Manabe	(Japan) Renofa Yamaguchi	Free transfer
Pre-season	MF	(Japan) Raiya Kinkawa	(Japan) Nissho Gakuen HS	Free transfer
Pre-season	MF	(Japan) Haruki Shinjo	Tegevajaro Miyazaki U18s	Promotion
Pre-season	FW	(Japan) Ryohei Yamazaki	(Japan) V-Varen Nagasaki	Full transfer
Pre-season	FW	(Japan) Rikito Sugiura	(Japan) Zweigen Kanazawa	Full transfer
Pre-season	FW	(Japan) Daisuke Ishizu	(Japan) FC Gifu	Free transfer
Pre-season	FW	(Japan) Kakeru Aoto	(Japan) Kamatamare Sanuki	Free transfer
Pre-season	FW	(Japan) Kazuma Nagata	(Japan) Fukuoka University	Free transfer
Pre-season	FW	(Japan) Harumi Minamino	(Japan) Gamba Osaka	Loan transfer
Pre-season	FW	(Japan) Kanta Matsumoto	(Japan) Montedio Yamagata	Loan transfer

Transfers out
Leave on	Pos.	Player	Moving to	Transfer type
Pre-season	DF	(Japan) Ko Watahiki	(Japan) SC Sagamihara	Free transfer
Pre-season	DF	(Japan) Shuhei Takizawa	(Japan) Joyful Honda Tsukuba	Free transfer
Pre-season	DF	(Japan) Ryota Kamino	(Japan) Veroskronos Tsuno	Free transfer
Pre-season	DF	(Japan) Kaili Shimbo	(Japan) Renofa Yamaguchi	Loan expiration
Pre-season	DF	(Japan) Yudai Okuda	(Japan) Tokushima Vortis	Loan expiration
Pre-season	MF	(Japan) Yuki Okada	(Japan) Giravanz Kitakyushu	Full transfer
Pre-season	MF	(Japan) Yudai Tokunaga	(Japan) Fujieda MYFC	Full transfer
Pre-season	MF	(Japan) Kazuki Chibu	(Japan) Kagoshima United	Full transfer
Pre-season	MF	(Japan) Makoto Mimura	(Japan) Fukuyama City	Free transfer
Pre-season	MF	(Japan) Megumu Nishida	(Japan) Zweigen Kanazawa	Loan expiration
Pre-season	MF	(Japan) Tatsuya Onodera	–	Retirement
Pre-season	FW	(Japan) Takuma Sonoda	(Japan) J-Lease FC	Free transfer

== Vanraure Hachinohe ==
Transfers in
Join on	Pos.	Player	Moving from	Transfer type
Pre-season	GK	(Japan) Shogo Onishi	(Japan) Kagoshima United	Full transfer
Pre-season	GK	(Japan) Peter Kwame Aizawa	(Japan) ReinMeer Aomori	Full transfer
Pre-season	DF	(Japan) Shintaro Kato	(Japan) Blaublitz Akita	Loan transfer
Pre-season	DF	(Japan) Yusuke Hasegawa	(Japan) MinebeaMitsumi	Free transfer
Pre-season	DF	(Japan) Daisuke Inazumi	(Japan) Kochi United	Free transfer
Pre-season	DF	(Japan) Haruki Mitsuda	(Japan) Matsumoto Yamaga	Free transfer
Pre-season	DF	(Japan) Kodai Minoda	(Japan) Shonan Bellmare	Loan transfer
Pre-season	MF	(Japan) Naoya Senoo	(Japan) Gainare Tottori	Free transfer
Pre-season	MF	(Japan) Yuya Himeno	(Japan) Kataller Toyama	Free transfer
Pre-season	MF	(Japan) Mizuki Aiba	(Japan) Kochi United	Free transfer
Pre-season	MF	(Japan) Riku Yamauchi	(Japan) Sapporo University	Free transfer
Pre-season	FW	(Japan) Takuya Miyamoto	(Japan) Fujieda MYFC	Full transfer
Pre-season	FW	(Japan) Taichi Sakuma	(Japan) JEF United Chiba	Loan transfer

Transfers out
Leave on	Pos.	Player	Moving to	Transfer type
Pre-season	GK	(Japan) Daiki Koike	(Japan) FC Tokushima	Free transfer
Pre-season	GK	(Japan) Kohei Hattori	(Japan) FC Osaka	Free transfer
Pre-season	DF	(Japan) Ryusei Shimodo	(Japan) Kataller Toyama	Full transfer
Pre-season	DF	(Japan) Takeru Itakura	(Japan) FC Osaka	Full transfer
Pre-season	DF	(Japan) Shunya Akamatsu	(Japan) Briobecca Urayasu	Free transfer
Pre-season	DF	(Japan) Daichi Kobayashi	(Japan) Kochi United	Free transfer
Pre-season	DF	(Japan) Kodai Fujii	(Japan) J-Lease FC	Free transfer
Pre-season	DF	(Japan) Tomoyuki Hirose	(Japan) Tokyo 2020 FC	Free transfer
Pre-season	DF	(Japan) Kazuki Sato	–	Contract expiration
Pre-season	DF	(Japan) Daichi Kobayashi	(Japan) Kochi United	Free transfer
Pre-season	MF	(Japan) Ryusei Nose	(Japan) Giravanz Kitakyushu	Full transfer
Pre-season	MF	(Japan) Satoru Maruoka	(Japan) ReinMeer Aomori	Free transfer
Pre-season	MF	(Japan) Kazuma Tsuboi	(Japan) Tiamo Hirakata	Free transfer
Pre-season	MF	(Japan) Taichi Nakamura	(Japan) Gakunan F. Mosuperio	FFree transfer
Pre-season	MF	(Japan) Koichi Miyao	(Japan) Veroskronos Tsuno	Free transfer
Pre-season	FW	(Japan) Takumi Shimada	(Japan) FC Osaka	Free transfer
Pre-season	FW	(Japan) Yusei Kayanuma	(Japan) YSCC Yokohama	Full transfer
Pre-season	FW	(Japan) Jun Arima	–	Retirement

== YSCC Yokohama ==
Transfers in
Join on	Pos.	Player	Moving from	Transfer type
29 Mar	FW	(Ecuador) Carlos Arroyo	Unattached	Free transfer
Pre-season	GK	(Japan) Michiya Okamoto	(Japan) FC Gifu	Free transfer
Pre-season	GK	(Japan) Jun Kodama	(Japan) Fukuyama City	Free transfer
Pre-season	DF	(Japan) Seiya Nikaido	(Japan) Niigata University HW	Free transfer
Pre-season	DF	(Japan) Sukai Numata	(Japan) Niigata University HW	Free transfer
Pre-season	DF	(Japan) Haruki Oshima	(Japan) Chukyo University	Free transfer
Pre-season	DF	(Japan) Hiroto Okoshi	(Japan) Toin University of Yokohama	Free transfer
Pre-season	MF	(Japan) Shuto Kojima	(Japan) JEF United Chiba	Free transfer
Pre-season	MF	(Japan) Koki Matsumura	(Japan) Fujieda MYFC	Free transfer
Pre-season	MF	(Japan) Sho Fukuda	(Japan) FC Imabari	Free transfer
Pre-season	MF	(Japan) Takahiro Nakazato	(Japan) Suzuka Point Getters	Free transfer
Pre-season	MF	(Japan) Yasuto Fujita	(Japan) Nippon SS University	Free transfer
Pre-season	MF	(Japan) Yusei Otake	(Japan) Toin University of Yokohama	Free transfer
Pre-season	MF	(Japan) Hiroto Domoto	YSCC Yokohama Second	Promotion
Pre-season	FW	(Japan) Yusuke Yoshii	(Japan) Kamatamare Sanuki	Free transfer
Pre-season	FW	(Japan) Yusei Kayanuma	(Japan) Vanraure Hachinohe	Full transfer
Pre-season	FW	(Japan) Rento Tahara	(Japan) Sanno University	Free transfer
Pre-season	FW	(Japan) Junpei Sakamoto	(Japan) Kanto Gakuin University	Free transfer

Transfers out
Leave on	Pos.	Player	Moving to	Transfer type
Pre-season	GK	(Chinese Taipei) Shunkun Tani	(Japan) Azul Claro Numazu	Full transfer
Pre-season	GK	(Japan) Ryo Ishii	(Japan) Urawa Red Diamonds	Loan expiration
Pre-season	DF	(Japan) Kei Munechika	(Japan) Kamatamare Sanuki	Full transfer
Pre-season	DF	(Japan) Kyosuke Hashimoto	(Japan) Vonds Ichihara	Free transfer
Pre-season	DF	(Japan) Yusuke Nishiyama	(Australia) Banyule City	Free transfer
Pre-season	DF	(Japan) Shun Nakamura	(Australia) Whittlesea Ranges	Free transfer
Pre-season	DF	(Japan) Yutaro Hoshino	–	Contract expiration
Pre-season	MF	(Japan) Yumemi Kanda	Hong Kong Rangers	Free transfer
Pre-season	MF	(Japan) Hiroto Miyauchi	(Japan) Yokohama Fifty Club	Free transfer
Pre-season	MF	(Japan) Riku Furuyado	(Japan) Yokohama FC	Loan expiration
Pre-season	MF	(Hong Kong) Au Yeung Yiu Chung	(Japan) Iwate Grulla Morioka	Free transfer
Pre-season	MF	(Japan) Tomoya Uemura	(Australia) Bentleigh United Cobras	Free transfer
Pre-season	MF	(Japan) Yumemi Kanda	–	Contract expiration
Pre-season	MF	(Japan) Kanta Wada	–	Contract expiration
Pre-season	MF	(Japan) Akio Yoshida	–	Retirement
Pre-season	FW	(Japan) Ren Furuyama	(Australia) George Cross	Free transfer
Pre-season	FW	(Japan) Shuntaro Kawabe	(Japan) Kagoshima United	Full transfer
Pre-season	FW	(Japan) Kazuya Oizumi	–	Retirement
Pre-season	FW	(North Korea) Han Yong-gi	–	Contract expiration
Pre-season	FW	(Japan) Tomoya Hayashi	–	Contract expiration

== See also ==
- List of J1 League football transfers winter 2022–23
- List of J2 League football transfers winter 2022–23
- List of Japan Football League football transfers winter 2022–23
