= Gen'ichi =

- Gender: Male

Origin
- Origin: Japanese
- Meaning: Different meanings depending on the kanji used

Gen'ichi or Genichi (written: 源一, 厳一, 玄一 or 元一) is a masculine Japanese given name. Notable people with the name include:

- Genichi Endo (遠藤 元一; born 1994), Japanese footballer
- Genichi Kawakami (川上 源一; 1912–2002), Japanese businessman
- Gen-ichi Koidzumi (小泉 源一; 1883–1953), Japanese botanist
- Genichi Taguchi (田口 玄一; 1924–2012), Japanese engineer and statistician
- Genichi Takahashi (高橋 厳一; born 1980), Japanese footballer
