= Iizumi =

Iizumi (written: 飯泉) is a Japanese surname. Notable people with the surname include:

- Kamon Iizumi (飯泉 嘉門, born 1960), Japanese politician
- Ryoya Iizumi (飯泉 涼矢, born 1995), Japanese footballer
