= Kensei =

Kensei may refer to:

== People with the given name ==
- Kensei Hasegawa (長谷川 憲正; born 1943), Japanese politician
- Kensei Mikami (水上 剣星; born 1984), Japanese actor
- Kensei Mizote (溝手 顕正; born 1942), Japanese politician
- Kensei Nakashima (中島 賢星; born 1996), Japanese football player
- Kensei Ukita (浮田 健誠; born 1997), Japanese footballer

== Other uses ==
- Kensei Hontō, a Japanese political party
- Kensei (horse), a racehorse
- Kensei (honorary title), a Japanese honorary title given to great swordsmen
- Kensei: Sacred Fist, a video game
