= Ukita =

Ukita (written: 浮田 or 宇喜多) is a Japanese surname. Notable people with the surname include:

- Ukita Hideie (宇喜多 秀家, 1573–1655), Japanese daimyō
- Kensei Ukita (浮田 健誠, born 1997), Japanese footballer
- Ukita Kōkichi (浮田 幸吉, 1757–1847), Japanese aviation pioneer
- Ukita Naoie (宇喜多 直家, 1529–1582), Japanese daimyō
- Rui Ukita (浮田 留衣, born 1996), Japanese ice hockey player
