= Tatsuya Shirai =

Tatsuya Shirai may refer to:

- Tatsuya Shirai (footballer)
- Tatsuya Shirai (wrestler)
