= Kenta Matsuyama =

Japanese footballer (born 1998)

Kenta Matsuyama 松山 健太
Personal information
- Date of birth: 17 November 1998 (age 27)
- Place of birth: Fukuoka, Japan
- Height: 1.88 m (6 ft 2 in)
- Position: Goalkeeper

Team information
- Current team: Tegevajaro Miyazaki
- Number: 19

Youth career
- Shiida SSC
- –2013: Shiida Junior High School
- 2014–2016: Kyushu Int. Univ. High School

College career
| Years | Team | Apps | (Gls) |
| 2017–2020 | Momoyama Gakuin University | | |

Senior career*
| Years | Team | Apps | (Gls) |
| 2021–2022 | Iwate Grulla Morioka | 20 | (0) |
| 2023–2024 | Kagoshima United | 21 | (0) |
| 2025 | Mito HollyHock | 0 | (0) |
| 2025 | → Urawa Reds (loan) | 0 | (0) |
| 2026 | Avispa Fukuoka | 0 | (0) |
| 2026– | Tegevajaro Miyazaki | 0 | (0) |
- * Club domestic league appearances and goals as of 22:14, 7 August 2026 (UTC)

Kenta Matsuyama (松山 健太, Matsuyama Kenta; born 17 November 1998) is a Japanese footballer currently playing as a goalkeeper for J2 League club Tegevajaro Miyazaki.

== Career statistics ==
=== Club ===
As of 7 August 2026.

Appearances and goals by club, season and competition
| Club | Season | League | | | National cup (Note: Includes Emperors Cup) | | Total | |
| Club | Season | Division | Apps | Goals | Apps | Goals | Apps | Goals |
|---|---|---|---|---|---|---|---|---|
| Iwate Grulla Morioka | 2021 | J3 League | 0 | 0 | 1 | 0 | 1 | 0 |
| Iwate Grulla Morioka | 2022 | J2 League | 20 | 0 | 2 | 0 | 22 | 0 |
| Iwate Grulla Morioka | Total | | 20 | 0 | 3 | 0 | 23 | 0 |
| Kagoshima United | 2023 | J3 League | 21 | 0 | 1 | 0 | 22 | 0 |
| Kagoshima United | 2024 | J2 League | 0 | 0 | 0 | 0 | 0 | 0 |
| Kagoshima United | Total | | 21 | 0 | 1 | 0 | 22 | 0 |
| Mito HollyHock | 2025 | J2 League | 0 | 0 | 0 | 0 | 0 | 0 |
| Urawa Reds (loan) | 2025 | J1 League | 0 | 0 | 0 | 0 | 0 | 0 |
| Avispa Fukuoka | 2026 | J1 (100) | 0 | 0 | – | | 0 | 0 |
| Tegevajaro Miyazaki | 2026–27 | J2 League | 0 | 0 | 0 | 0 | 0 | 0 |
| Career total | | | 41 | 0 | 4 | 0 | 45 | 0 |
