= Daichi Kobayashi =

Japanese footballer

Daichi Kobayashi 小林 大智
Personal information
- Date of birth: 7 January 1999 (age 27)
- Place of birth: Osaka, Japan
- Height: 1.80 m (5 ft 11 in)
- Position: Defender

Team information
- Current team: Kochi United
- Number: 4

Youth career
- –2013: Kemmei SC
- 2014–2016: Sakuyo HS
- 2017–2020: Momoyama Gakuin University

Senior career*
Years	Team	Apps	(Gls)
2021–2022	Vanraure Hachinohe	15	(0)
2023–	Kochi United	90	(4)
- * Club domestic league appearances and goals as of 21 August 2026

Daichi Kobayashi (小林 大智, Kobayashi Daichi; born January 7, 1999) is a Japanese footballer who play as a Centre-back, captain and currently play for J3 League club, Kochi United.

== Career ==
On 15 January 2021, Kobayashi announce official signing first professional contract with Vanraure Hachinohe from Momoyama Gakuin University.

On 14 March 2021, Kobayashi debut first professional J3 match against FC Gifu on Matchweek 1.

Although he participated in the opening match, he suffered an injury to the Anterior Cruciate Ligament of his left knee at Iwate Grulla Morioka in Matchweek 5 of J3 on 11 April 2021, which took 8 months to fully recover.

Kobayashi contract with Vanraure Hachinohe expire in 2022 season.

On 5 January 2023, Kobayashi joined to JFL club, Kochi United for 2023 season. On 8 December 2024, Kobayashi was brought his club secure promotion to J3 League for the first time in their history from next season after defeat YSCC Yokohama 0-2 in second leg and win aggregate 1-3.

== Career statistics ==
=== Club ===
As of the start for 2025 season.

Club	Season	League			National Cup		League Cup		Other		Total	
Club	Season	Division	Apps	Goals	Apps	Goals	Apps	Goals	Apps	Goals	Apps	Goals
Vanraure Hachinohe	2021	J3 League	5	0	0	0	–		0	0	5	0
Vanraure Hachinohe	2022	J3 League	10	0	1	0	–		0	0	11	0
Kochi United	2023	Japan Football League	27	2	4	0	–		0	0	31	2
Kochi United	2024	Japan Football League	22	0	1	0	–		2 (Note: Includes J3/JFL Play-offs)	0	25	0
Kochi United	2025	J3 League	0	0	0	0	0	0	0	0	0	0
Career total			64	2	6	0	0	0	2	0	72	2

== Honours ==
Kochi United SC

- Japan Football League: 2024
