= Kentaro Kakoi =

Japanese footballer (born 1991)

Kentaro Kakoi 圍 謙太朗
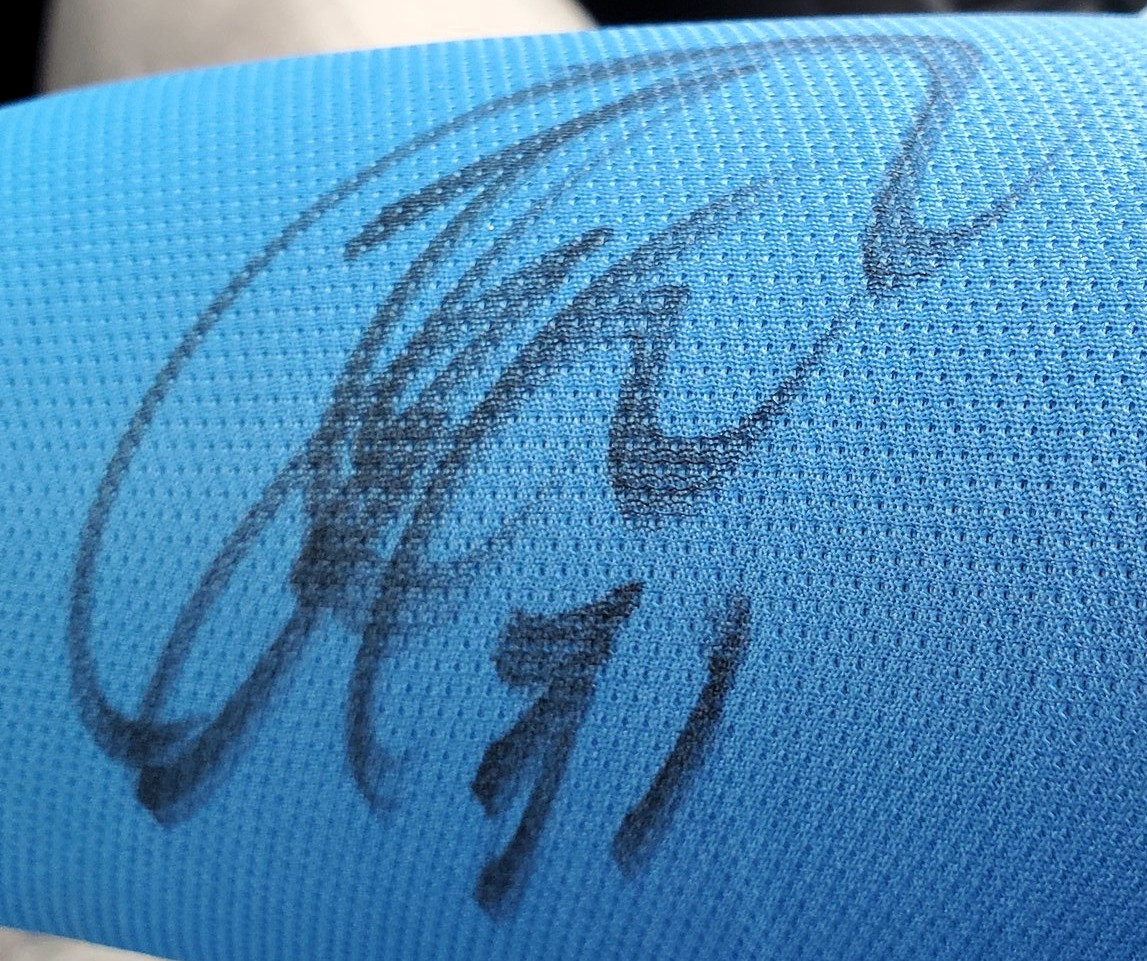

Personal information
- Full name: Kentaro Kakoi
- Date of birth: 23 April 1991 (age 35)
- Place of birth: Nagasaki, Japan
- Height: 1.90 m (6 ft 3 in)
- Position: Goalkeeper

Team information
- Current team: Kyoto Sanga
- Number: 21

Youth career
- 1998–2003: Doinokubi Elementary School
- 2004–2006: Nagasaki Rainbow SC
- 2007–2009: Ohzu High School

College career
Years	Team	Apps	(Gls)
2010–2013	Momoyama Gakuin University		

Senior career*
Years	Team	Apps	(Gls)
2014–2016	FC Tokyo	0	(0)
2016	→ FC Tokyo U-23 (loan)	21	(0)
2017–2019	Cerezo Osaka	0	(0)
2017–2019	→ Cerezo Osaka U-23	13	(0)
2018	→ Avispa Fukuoka (loan)	26	(0)
2020–2021	Matsumoto Yamaga	41	(0)
2022	SC Sagamihara	29	(0)
2023–2024	Blaublitz Akita	65	(0)
2024–	Kyoto Sanga	1	(0)
Medal record
Cerezo Osaka
Winner	J.League Cup	2017
Winner	Emperor's Cup	2017
- * Club domestic league appearances and goals as of 1 August 2026

Kentaro Kakoi (圍 謙太朗, Kakoi Kentarō; born 23 April 1991) is a Japanese footballer who plays for Kyoto Sanga.

== Club team career statistics ==
Updated to 6 January 2023.

Club performance			League		Cup		League Cup		Continental		Total	
Season	Club	League	Apps	Goals	Apps	Goals	Apps	Goals	Apps	Goals	Apps	Goals
Japan			League		Emperor's Cup		League Cup		AFC		Total	
2014	FC Tokyo	J1 League	0	0	0	0	0	0	–		0	0
2015	FC Tokyo	J1 League	0	0	0	0	0	0	–		0	0
2016	FC Tokyo	J1 League	0	0	0	0	0	0	1	0	1	0
2017	Cerezo Osaka	J1 League	0	0	0	0	1	0	–		1	0
2018	Avispa Fukuoka	J2 League	26	0	0	0	–		–		26	0
2019	Cerezo Osaka	J1 League	0	0	3	0	7	0	–		10	0
2020	Matsumoto Yamaga	J2 League	15	0	–		0	0	–		15	0
2021	Matsumoto Yamaga	J2 League	26	0	0	0	–		–		26	0
2022	SC Sagamihara	J3 League	29	0	–		–		–		29	0
2023	Blaublitz Akita	J2 League	0	0	0	0	–		–		0	0
Career total			96	0	3	0	8	0	1	0	108	0

== Reserves performance ==
Last Updated: 25 February 2019

Club performance			League		Total	
Season	Club	League	Apps	Goals	Apps	Goals
Japan			League		Total	
2016	FC Tokyo U-23	J3	21	0	21	0
2017	Cerezo Osaka	J3	9	0	9	0
Career total			30	0	30	0
