= Shinji Okada =

Japanese footballer

Shinji Okada 岡田 慎司
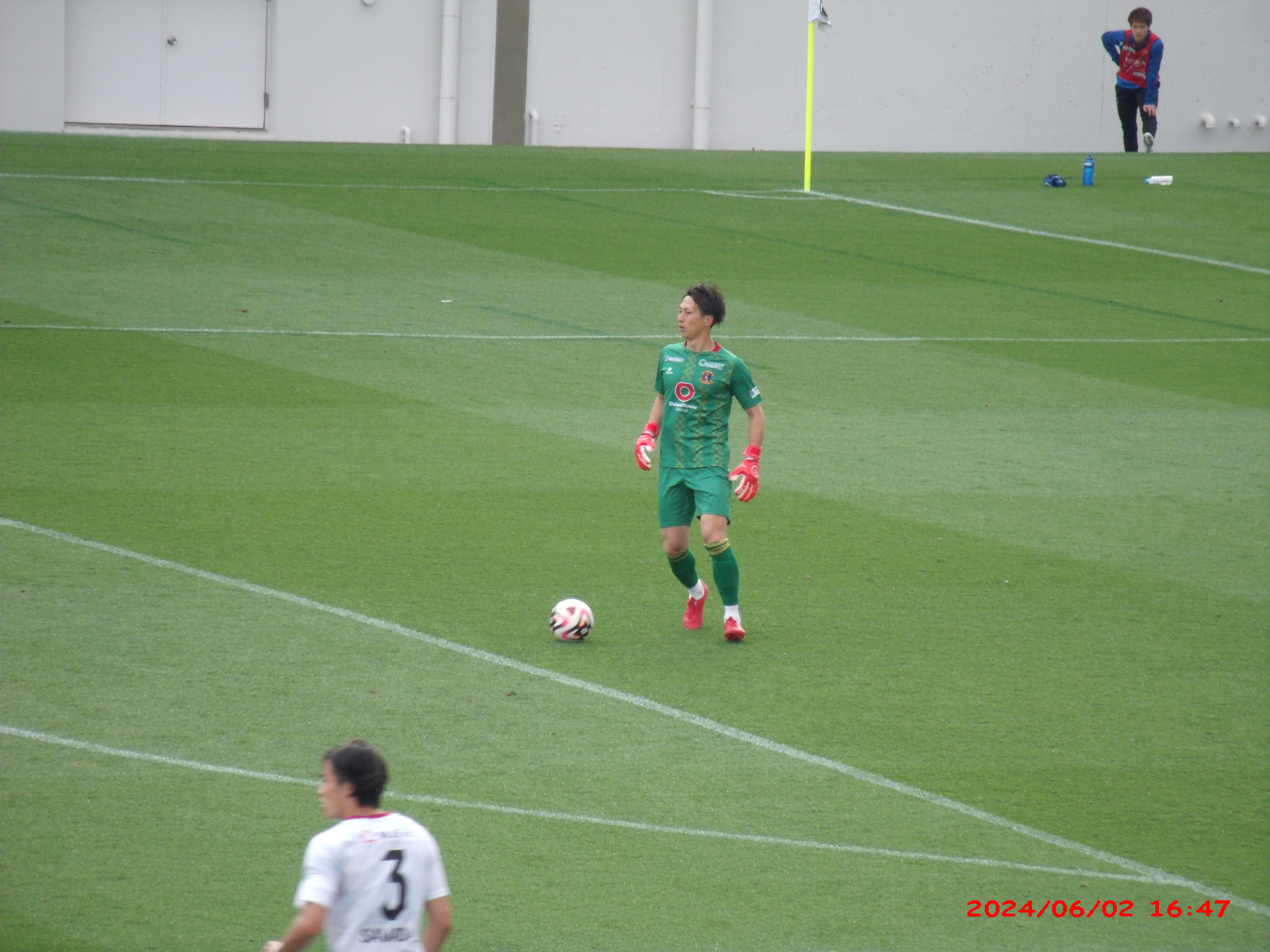

Personal information
- Date of birth: 10 March 1996 (age 30)
- Place of birth: Tōon, Ehime, Japan
- Height: 1.80 m (5 ft 11 in)
- Position: Goalkeeper

Team information
- Current team: Thespa Gunma
- Number: 78

Youth career
- –2010: Shigenobu Junior High School
- 2011–2013: Matsuyama Kogyo High School

College career
Years	Team	Apps	(Gls)
2014–2017	Biwako Seikei Sport College		

Senior career*
Years	Team	Apps	(Gls)
2018–2022	FC Imabari	22	(0)
2023–2026	Nara Club	70	(0)
2026–	Thespa Gunma	0	(0)
- * Club domestic league appearances and goals as of 25 August 2026

Shinji Okada (岡田 慎司, Okada Shinji; born 10 March 1996) is a Japanese footballer currently playing as a goalkeeper for Thespa Gunma.

== Career ==
Early in his first steps into football, Okada played and studied at Shigenobu Junior High School, Matsuyama Kogyo High School and Biwako Seikei Sport College.

Okada begin first professional career with FC Imabari in 2018. FC Imabari announces Okada left from the club after expiration contract on 28 November 2022, he play five years at Imabari.

On 26 December at same year, Okada announcement officially transfer to J3 promotion club, Nara Club for upcoming 2023 season.

== Career statistics ==
=== Club ===
As of the start from 2023 season.

Club	Season	League			National Cup		League Cup		Other		Total	
Club	Season	Division	Apps	Goals	Apps	Goals	Apps	Goals	Apps	Goals	Apps	Goals
Biwako Seikei Sport College	2017	–			1 (Note: Appearances in the Emperor's Cup)	0	–		0	0	1	0
FC Imabari	2018	JFL	7	0	1	0	–		0	0	8	0
FC Imabari	2019	JFL	3	0	0	0	–		0	0	3	0
FC Imabari	2020	J3 League	6	0	0	0	–		0	0	6	0
FC Imabari	2021	J3 League	2	0	1	0	–		0	0	3	0
FC Imabari	2022	J3 League	4	0	1	0	–		0	0	5	0
FC Imabari	Total		22	0	3	0	0	0	0	0	25	0
Nara Club	2023	J3 League	0	0	0	0	–		0	0	0	0
Nara Club	Total		0	0	0	0	0	0	0	0	0	0
Career total			22	0	3	0	0	0	0	0	25	0
