= Kohei Shin =

Japanese footballer

Kohei Shin 進 昂平
Personal information
- Full name: Kohei Shin
- Date of birth: June 4, 1995 (age 31)
- Place of birth: Saitama, Japan
- Height: 1.72 m (5 ft 7 1/2 in)
- Position: Forward

Team information
- Current team: Nagano Parceiro
- Number: 11

Youth career
- Higashi Kawaguchi SC
- –2013: Urawa Red Diamonds

College career
Years	Team	Apps	(Gls)
2014–2017	Tokyo International University		

Senior career*
Years	Team	Apps	(Gls)
2018–2019	YSCC Yokohama	42	(15)
2020–2023	Thespakusatsu Gunma	49	(4)
2021–2022	→ Ehime (loan)	15	(2)
2023–	Nagano Parceiro	81	(12)
- * Club domestic league appearances and goals as of 14:39, 4 November 2026 (UTC)

Kohei Shin (進 昂平, Shin Kohei; born June 4, 1995 in Saitama) is a Japanese footballer who currently plays as a forward for J3 League club Nagano Parceiro.

== Career ==
After graduating at Tokyo International University and even playing three Emperor's Cup games, Shin signed for YSCC Yokohama in January 2018. In the 2018 season opening game, the forward came on in the 82nd minute against SC Sagamihara.

== Club statistics ==
As of 4 November 2026.

Appearances and goals by club, season and competition
Club	Season	League			National cup (Note: Includes Emperor's Cup)		League cup (Note: Includes J.League Cup)		Total	
Club	Season	Division	Apps	Goals	Apps	Goals	Apps	Goals	Apps	Goals
YSCC Yokohama	2018	J3 League	12	0	2	0	–		14	0
YSCC Yokohama	2019	J3 League	30	15	0	0	–		30	15
YSCC Yokohama	Total		42	15	2	0	0	0	44	15
Thespakusatsu Gunma	2020	J2 League	30	2	0	0	–		30	2
Thespakusatsu Gunma	2021	J2 League	19	2	3	1	–		22	3
Thespakusatsu Gunma	Total		49	4	3	1	0	0	52	5
Ehime FC (loan)	2022	J3 League	15	2	–		–		15	2
Nagano Parceiro	2023	J3 League	20	4	1	0	0	0	21	4
Nagano Parceiro	2024	J3 League	11	3	2	1	1	0	14	4
Nagano Parceiro	2025	J3 League	31	5	0	0	1	0	32	5
Nagano Parceiro	2026	J2/J3 (100)	15	0	–		–		15	0
Nagano Parceiro	2026–27	J3 League	4	0	2	0	0	0	6	0
Nagano Parceiro	Total		81	12	5	1	2	0	88	13
Career total			187	33	10	2	2	0	199	35
