= Takeru Itakura =

Japanese footballer

Takeru Itakura 板倉 洸
Personal information
- Date of birth: 6 April 1998 (age 28)
- Place of birth: Saitama, Saitama, Japan
- Height: 1.80 m (5 ft 11 in)
- Position: Defender

Team information
- Current team: Renofa Yamaguchi FC
- Number: 15

Youth career
- Omiya Ryusei
- –2016: Yokohama F. Marinos

College career
Years	Team	Apps	(Gls)
2017–2020	Toyo University		

Senior career*
Years	Team	Apps	(Gls)
2021–2022	Vanraure Hachinohe	35	(3)
2023–2024	FC Osaka	33	(0)
2024–	Renofa Yamaguchi	36	(0)
- * Club domestic league appearances and goals as of 21 August 2026

Takeru Itakura (板倉 洸, Itakura Takeru; born 6 April 1998) is a Japanese footballer who plays as a defender for Renofa Yamaguchi FC.

== Career ==
Itakura started his youth career with Omiya Ryusei, and played at Yokohama F. Marinos until 2016, when he entered Toyo University on 2017, graduating in 2020.

After his graduation, Itakura began his professional career with Vanraure Hachinohe, starting from the 2021 season. He is often mistaken for Ko Itakura, but they are not related. He made his league debut against Roasso Kumamoto on 25 April 2021. Itakura scored his first league goal against Sagamihara on 15 June 2022, scoring in the 7th minute.

On 29 December 2022, Itakura officially transferred to the newly promoted J3 club FC Osaka for the 2023 season. He made his league debut against Imabari on 9 April 2023.

On 15 December 2023, Itakura was announced at Renofa Yamaguchi. He made his league debut against Tokushima Vortis on 20 March 2024. On 12 December 2024, Itakura's contract with the club was extended for the 2025 season.

== Career statistics ==
=== Club ===
As of the start from 2023 season.

Club	Season	League			National Cup		League Cup		Other		Total	
Club	Season	Division	Apps	Goals	Apps	Goals	Apps	Goals	Apps	Goals	Apps	Goals
Vanraure Hachinohe	2021	J3 League	11	0	3	0	–		0	0	14	0
Vanraure Hachinohe	2022	J3 League	20	3	1	0	–		0	0	21	3
Vanraure Hachinohe	Total		31	3	4	0	0	0	0	0	35	3
FC Osaka	2023	J3 League	0	0	0	0	–		0	0	0	0
FC Osaka	Total		0	0	0	0	0	0	0	0	0	0
Career total			31	3	4	0	0	0	0	0	35	3
