= Kazuya Oizumi =

Japanese footballer (born 1991)

Kazuya Oizumi 大泉和也
Personal information
- Full name: Kazuya Oizumi
- Date of birth: 19 June 1991 (age 35)
- Place of birth: Kanagawa, Japan
- Height: 1.72 m (5 ft 8 in)
- Position: Forward

Team information
- Current team: YSCC Yokohama
- Number: 9

Youth career
- 2007–2009: Yokohama FC Youth
- 2010–2013: Toin University of Yokohama

Senior career*
Years	Team	Apps	(Gls)
2014–	YSCC Yokohama	128	(10)
- * Club domestic league appearances and goals as of 23 February 2019

Kazuya Oizumi (大泉和也, Oizumi, Kazuya; born 19 June 1991 in Kanagawa) is a Japanese footballer who plays for YSCC Yokohama.

== Club statistics ==
Updated to 23 February 2019.

Club performance			League		Cup		Total	
Season	Club	League	Apps	Goals	Apps	Goals	Apps	Goals
Japan			League		Emperor's Cup		Total	
2014	YSCC Yokohama	J3 League	15	1	1	0	16	1
2015	YSCC Yokohama	J3 League	25	1	0	0	25	1
2016	YSCC Yokohama	J3 League	29	2	0	0	29	2
2017	YSCC Yokohama	J3 League	28	2	1	0	29	2
2018	YSCC Yokohama	J3 League	31	4	2	0	33	4
Career total			128	10	4	0	132	10
