= Ryota Kitamura =

Japanese footballer

Ryota Kitamura 北村 椋太
Personal information
- Date of birth: 30 June 1998 (age 28)
- Place of birth: Kanagawa, Japan
- Height: 1.67 m (5 ft 6 in)
- Position: Defender

Team information
- Current team: Tegevajaro Miyazaki

Youth career
- SCH.FC
- –2016: Shonan Bellmare
- 2017–2020: Kanto Gakuin University

Senior career*
Years	Team	Apps	(Gls)
2021–2022	Fukushima United	19	(0)
2023–	Tegevajaro Miyazaki	0	(0)
- * Club domestic league appearances and goals as of 22 December 2022, 12:08 (UTC)

Ryota Kitamura (北村 椋太, Kitamura Ryota; born 30 June 1998) is a Japanese footballer currently playing as a defender for Tegevajaro Miyazaki from 2023.

== Career ==
On 17 March 2021, Kitamura joined the J3 club, Fukushima United ahead for the 2021 J3 League season. Although he will participate in 16 games in the 2022 season. On 14 November 2022, he left the club after two years in Fukushima.

On 17 December 2022, Kitamura joined to J3 club, Tegevajaro Miyazaki from 2023 season.

== Career statistics ==
=== Club ===
As of the end 2022 season.

Club	Season	League			National Cup		League Cup		Other		Total	
Club	Season	Division	Apps	Goals	Apps	Goals	Apps	Goals	Apps	Goals	Apps	Goals
Fukushima United	2021	J3 League	16	0	0	0	–		0	0	16	0
Fukushima United	2022	J3 League	3	0	2	0	–		0	0	5	0
Tegevajaro Miyazaki	2023	J3 League	0	0	0	0	–		0	0	0	0
Career total			19	0	2	0	0	0	0	0	21	0
