= Shintaro Ihara =

Japanese footballer

Shintaro Ihara 井原 伸太郎
Personal information
- Date of birth: 21 October 1991 (age 35)
- Place of birth: Yamaguchi, Japan
- Height: 1.78 m (5 ft 10 in)
- Position: Defender

Team information
- Current team: Tegevajaro Miyazaki

Youth career
- 2007–2009: Kamimura Gakuen High School

College career
Years	Team	Apps	(Gls)
2010–2013	Japan University of Economics		

Senior career*
Years	Team	Apps	(Gls)
2014–2015	Lao Toyota		
2016	J.FC Miyazaki	7	(1)
2017–2021	Tegevajaro Miyazaki	89	(3)
2022	Kagoshima United FC	16	(0)
2023–	Tegevajaro Miyazaki	0	(0)
- * Club domestic league appearances and goals as of 20 December 2022, 16:22 (UTC)

Shintaro Ihara (井原 伸太郎, Ihara Shintaro; born 21 October 1991) is a Japanese footballer currently playing as a defender for Tegevajaro Miyazaki from 2023.

== Career ==
In 2016, Ihara joined to J.FC Miyazaki.

On 12 January 2017, Ihara joined to Tegevajaro Miyazaki.

On 27 December 2021 Ihara joined to J3 club, Kagoshima United from 2022.

On 25 December 2022, Ihara officially return to former club, Tegevajaro Miyazaki for upcoming 2023 season.

== Career statistics ==
=== Club ===
As of the end 2022 season.

Club	Season	League			National Cup		League Cup		Other		Total	
Club	Season	Division	Apps	Goals	Apps	Goals	Apps	Goals	Apps	Goals	Apps	Goals
Lao Toyota	2015	Lao Premier League	–						6 (Note: Appearances in the AFC Cup)	0	6	0
J.FC Miyazaki	2016	Kyushu Soccer League	7	1	0	0	–		3 (Note: Appearances in the Japanese Regional Football League Competition)	0	10	1
Tegevajaro Miyazaki	2017	Kyushu Soccer League	20	0	0	0	–		6	0	26	0
Tegevajaro Miyazaki	2018	JFL	23	1	1 (Note: Appearances in the Emperor's Cup)	0	–		0	0	24	1
Tegevajaro Miyazaki	2019	JFL	28	1	0	0	–		0	0	28	1
Tegevajaro Miyazaki	2020	JFL	15	1	0	0	–		0	0	15	1
Tegevajaro Miyazaki	2021	J3 League	23	0	0	0	–		0	0	23	0
Tegevajaro Miyazaki	Total		116	4	1	0	0	0	15	0	132	4
Kagoshima United	2022	J3 League	16	0	2	0	–		0	0	18	0
Kagoshima United	Total		16	0	2	0	0	0	0	0	18	0
Tegevajaro Miyazaki	2023	J3 League	0	0	0	0	–		0	0	0	0
Tegevajaro Miyazaki	Total		0	0	0	0	0	0	0	0	0	0
Career total			105	4	3	0	0	0	15	0	123	4
