= Hiroyuki Tsubokawa =

Japanese footballer

Personal information
- Date of birth: 15 May 1997 (age 29)
- Place of birth: Hokkaido, Japan
- Height: 1.76 m (5 ft 9 in)
- Position: Midfielder

Team information
- Current team: Kataller Toyama
- Number: 17

Youth career
- Sapporo Junior FC
- 2013–2015: Yaita Chuo High School

College career
Years	Team	Apps	(Gls)
2016–2019	Toyo University		

Senior career*
Years	Team	Apps	(Gls)
2020–2022	Nagano Parceiro	79	(4)
2023-	Kataller Toyama	22	(2)
Total		101	(6)
- * Club domestic league appearances and goals as of 13:46 @ 11 January 2024(AEST)

Hiroyuki Tsubokawa (坪川 潤之, Tsubokawa Hiroyuki; born 15 May 1997) is a Japanese footballer currently playing as a midfielder for Kataller Toyama

== Career statistics ==
=== Club ===
As of 1 April 2021.

Club	Season	League			National Cup		League Cup		Other		Total	
Club	Season	Division	Apps	Goals	Apps	Goals	Apps	Goals	Apps	Goals	Apps	Goals
Nagano Parceiro	2020	J3 League	30	1	0	0	–		0	0	30	1
Nagano Parceiro	2021	J3 League	0	0	0	0	–		0	0	0	0
Career total			30	1	0	0	0	0	0	0	30	1
