= Shogo Onishi =

Japanese footballer

Shogo Onishi 大西 勝俉
Personal information
- Full name: Shogo Onishi
- Date of birth: July 29, 1990 (age 36)
- Place of birth: Osaka, Japan
- Height: 1.85 m (6 ft 1 in)
- Position: Goalkeeper

Team information
- Current team: Vanraure Hachinohe
- Number: 13

Youth career
- 2006–2008: Kindai University High School

College career
Years	Team	Apps	(Gls)
2009–2012	Kindai University		

Senior career*
Years	Team	Apps	(Gls)
2013–2016	Ehime FC	3	(0)
2017–2018	Azul Claro Numazu	23	(0)
2019–2022	Kagoshima United FC	58	(0)
2023–	Vanraure Hachinohe	91	(0)
- * Club domestic league appearances and goals as of 13 August 2026

Shogo Onishi (大西 勝俉, Onishi Shogo; born July 29, 1990 in Osaka) is a Japanese football player who currently plays for Vanraure Hachinohe

== Career ==
Onishi began his youth career with Kindai University in 2009 until he graduated in 2012.

Onishi began his professional career with Ehime FC in 2013.

On 30 December 2016, Onishi signed with the J3 promoted club, Azul Claro Numazu, from Ehime FC.

On 26 December 2018, Onishi joined Kagoshima United FC, who had been promoted from the J2 league. He left the club in 2022 after four years at Kagoshima.

On 26 December 2022, Onishi officially transferred to the J3 club Vanraure Hachinohe for the upcoming 2023 season.

== Career statistics ==
Updated to the end 2022 season.

Appearances and goals by club, season and competition
Club	Season	League			Emperor's Cup		Total	
Club	Season	Division	Apps	Goals	Apps	Goals	Apps	Goals
Ehime FC	2013	J2 League	0	0	0	0	0	0
Ehime FC	2014	J2 League	3	0	2	0	5	0
Ehime FC	2015	J2 League	0	0	0	0	0	0
Ehime FC	2016	J2 League	0	0	0	0	0	0
Azul Claro Numazu	2017	J3 League	19	0	1	0	20	0
Azul Claro Numazu	2018	J3 League	4	0	0	0	4	0
Kagoshima United	2019	J2 League	5	0	0	0	5	0
Kagoshima United	2020	J3 League	30	0	0	0	30	0
Kagoshima United	2021	J3 League	23	0	1	0	24	0
Kagoshima United	2022	J3 League	0	0	0	0	0	0
Vanraure Hachinohe	2023	J3 League	0	0	0	0	0	0
Career total			84	0	4	0	88	0
