= Issei Tone =

Japanese footballer

Personal information
- Date of birth: 22 May 1996 (age 30)
- Place of birth: Osaka, Japan
- Height: 1.83 m (6 ft 0 in)
- Position: Defender

Team information
- Current team: Oita Trinita
- Number: 30

Youth career
- Mikkaichi FC
- –2011: Nagano FC
- 2012–2014: Kokoku High School

College career
Years	Team	Apps	(Gls)
2015–2018	Tokai Gakuen University		

Senior career*
Years	Team	Apps	(Gls)
2019–2021	Kataller Toyama	47	(3)
2022	Iwate Grulla Morioka	18	(0)
2023–2024	Kagoshima United FC	53	(2)
2025–	Oita Trinita	28	(2)
- * Club domestic league appearances and goals as of 16 August 2026

Issei Tone (戸根 一誓, Tone Issei; born 22 May 1996) is a Japanese footballer currently playing as a defender for Oita Trinita.

== Career statistics ==
=== Club ===
As of 1 April 2021.

Club	Season	League			National Cup		League Cup		Other		Total	
Club	Season	Division	Apps	Goals	Apps	Goals	Apps	Goals	Apps	Goals	Apps	Goals
Kataller Toyama	2019	J3 League	0	0	0	0	–		0	0	0	0
Kataller Toyama	2020	J3 League	19	1	0	0	–		0	0	19	1
Kataller Toyama	2021	J3 League	3	0	0	0	–		0	0	3	0
Career total			22	1	0	0	0	0	0	0	22	1
