= Ryoma Kita =

Japanese footballer

Personal information
- Date of birth: 16 April 1998 (age 28)
- Place of birth: Kyoto, Japan
- Height: 1.75 m (5 ft 9 in)
- Position: Midfielder

Team information
- Current team: FC Gifu
- Number: 10

Youth career
- 2014–2016: Kokoku High School

College career
Years	Team	Apps	(Gls)
2017–2020	Kanto Gakuin University		

Senior career*
Years	Team	Apps	(Gls)
2021–2022	Azul Claro Numazu	47	(3)
2023–	FC Gifu	113	(13)
- * Club domestic league appearances and goals as of 17 August 2026

Ryoma Kita (北 龍磨, Kita Ryoma; born 16 April 1998) is a Japanese footballer currently playing as a midfielder for FC Gifu.
