= Tomoya Uemura =

Japanese footballer

Personal information
- Date of birth: 19 May 2000 (age 26)
- Place of birth: Kanagawa, Japan
- Height: 1.73 m (5 ft 8 in)
- Position: Midfielder

Team information
- Current team: YSCC Yokohama
- Number: 26

Youth career
- Ipponmatsu SC
- Yokohama Junior SC
- –2019: YSCC Yokohama

Senior career*
Years	Team	Apps	(Gls)
2019–	YSCC Yokohama	20	(0)
- * Club domestic league appearances and goals as of 17:04, 28 March 2021 (UTC)

Tomoya Uemura (植村 友哉, Uemura Tomoya; born 19 May 2000) is a Japanese footballer currently playing as a midfielder for YSCC Yokohama of J3 League.

== Career statistics ==
=== Club ===
As of 28 March 2021.

Club	Season	League			National Cup		League Cup		Other		Total	
Club	Season	Division	Apps	Goals	Apps	Goals	Apps	Goals	Apps	Goals	Apps	Goals
YSCC Yokohama	2019	J3 League	5	0	0	0	–		0	0	5	0
YSCC Yokohama	2020	J3 League	15	0	0	0	–		0	0	15	0
YSCC Yokohama	2021	J3 League	0	0	0	0	–		0	0	0	0
Career total			4	0	0	0	0	0	0	0	4	0
