= Carlos Duke =

Japanese football player (born 2000)

Carlos Duke デューク・カルロス
Personal information
- Full name: Carlos Duke
- Date of birth: 28 February 2000 (age 26)
- Place of birth: Tokyo, Japan
- Height: 1.77 m (5 ft 9 1/2 in)
- Position: Midfielder

Team information
- Current team: FC Hegelmann
- Number: 7

Youth career
- 2015–2017: Kawasaki Frontale

Senior career*
| Years | Team | Apps | (Gls) |
| 2018–2022 | Fagiano Okayama | 9 | (0) |
| 2021 | → Machida Zelvia(loan) | 7 | (0) |
| 2022 | → Nagano Parceiro(loan) | 31 | (2) |
| 2023 | SC Sagamihara | 19 | (1) |
| 2024 | Valmiera | 13 | (0) |
| 2025– | Hegelmann | 50 | (3) |
- * Club domestic league appearances and goals as of 3 August 2026

Carlos Duke (デューク・カルロス, Dyūku Karurosu; born February 28, 2000) is a Japanese football player who play as Midfielder. He currently plays for the Lithuanian Hegelmann Club.

== Club career ==
Duke was born in Tokyo on February 28, 2000.

He joined J2 League club Fagiano Okayama from Kawasaki Frontale youth team in 2018. On June 6, he debuted against FC Machida Zelvia in Emperor's Cup.

On 12 January 2021, Duke loaned to Machida Zelvia for a season.

On 6 January 2022, Duke loaned again to Nagano Parceiro. On 28 December at same year, Duke sign transfer to J3 club, SC Sagamihara for upcoming 2023 season.

=== Hegelmann ===
On 5 February 2025 Carlos Duke signed with Lithuanian Hegelmann Club.

== Career statistics ==
=== Club ===
As of the start of 2023 season.

| Club | Season | League | | | National Cup | | League Cup | | Other | | Total | |
| Club | Season | Division | Apps | Goals | Apps | Goals | Apps | Goals | Apps | Goals | Apps | Goals |
|---|---|---|---|---|---|---|---|---|---|---|---|---|
| Fagiano Okayama | 2020 | J2 League | 9 | 0 | 0 | 0 | 0 | 0 | 0 | 0 | 9 | 0 |
| Machida Zelvia (loan) | 2021 | J2 League | 7 | 0 | 0 | 0 | 0 | 0 | 0 | 0 | 7 | 0 |
| Nagano Parceiro (loan) | 2022 | J3 League | 31 | 2 | 0 | 0 | 0 | 0 | 0 | 0 | 31 | 2 |
| SC Sagamihara | 2023 | J3 League | 0 | 0 | 0 | 0 | 0 | 0 | 0 | 0 | 0 | 0 |
| Career total | | | 47 | 2 | 0 | 0 | 0 | 0 | 0 | 0 | 47 | 0 |
