= Riku Hashimoto =

Japanese footballer

Riku Hashimoto 橋本 陸
Personal information
- Date of birth: 11 February 1998 (age 28)
- Place of birth: Saitama, Japan
- Height: 1.72 m (5 ft 8 in)
- Position: Defender

Team information
- Current team: FC Osaka
- Number: 16

Youth career
- Kamifukuoka SC
- –2012: Sakado Diplomats FC
- 2013–2015: Seibudai High School

College career
Years	Team	Apps	(Gls)
2016–2019	Hosei University		

Senior career*
Years	Team	Apps	(Gls)
2020–2022	Fukushima United	50	(5)
2023–2024	SC Sagamihara	71	(4)
2025–	FC Osaka	30	(0)
- * Club domestic league appearances and goals as of 1 January 2026

Riku Hashimoto (橋本 陸, Hashimoto Riku; born 11 February 1998) is a Japanese footballer currently playing as a defender for FC Osaka from 2025.

== Career statistics ==
=== Club ===
As of the end 2022 season.

Club	Season	League			National Cup		League Cup		Other		Total	
Club	Season	Division	Apps	Goals	Apps	Goals	Apps	Goals	Apps	Goals	Apps	Goals
Hosei University	2019	–			2 (Note: Appearance(s) in Emperor's Cup)	1	–		0	0	2	1
Fukushima United	2020	J3 League	25	3	0	0	–		0	0	25	3
Fukushima United	2021	J3 League	25	2	0	0	–		0	0	25	2
Fukushima United	2022	J3 League	32	5	2	0	–		0	0	34	5
Fukushima United	Total		82	10	4	1	0	0	0	0	86	11
SC Sagamihara	2023	J3 League	0	0	0	0	–		0	0	0	0
SC Sagamihara	Total		0	0	0	0	0	0	0	0	0	0
Career total			82	10	4	1	0	0	0	0	86	11
