= Kazuki Chibu =

Japanese footballer

Personal information
- Date of birth: 13 July 1995 (age 31)
- Place of birth: Hiroshima, Japan
- Height: 1.76 m (5 ft 9 in)
- Position: Midfielder

Team information
- Current team: Kagoshima United FC
- Number: 7

Youth career
- Shingai FC
- Sanfrecce Tsuneishi
- 2011–2013: Fagiano Okayama

Senior career*
Years	Team	Apps	(Gls)
2012–2016	Fagiano Okayama Next	86	(3)
2017	Verspah Oita	29	(0)
2018–2022	Tegevajaro Miyazaki	52	(1)
2023-	Kagoshima United	50	(1)
- * Club domestic league appearances and goals as of 1 January 2026

Kazuki Chibu (千布 一輝, Chibu Kazuki; born 13 July 1995) is a Japanese footballer currently playing as a midfielder for Kagoshima United FC.

== Career statistics ==
=== Club ===
As of 23 June 2021.

Club	Season	League			National Cup		League Cup		Other		Total	
Club	Season	Division	Apps	Goals	Apps	Goals	Apps	Goals	Apps	Goals	Apps	Goals
Fagiano Okayama Next	2012	Chūgoku Soccer League	2	0	0	0	–		0	0	2	0
Fagiano Okayama Next	2013	Chūgoku Soccer League	0	0	0	0	–		0	0	0	0
Fagiano Okayama Next	2014	JFL	26	0	1 (Note: Appearances in the Emperor's Cup)	0	–		0	0	27	0
Fagiano Okayama Next	2015	JFL	29	2	0	0	–		0	0	29	2
Fagiano Okayama Next	2016	JFL	29	1	1	0	–		0	0	30	1
Fagiano Okayama Next	Total		86	3	2	0	0	0	0	0	88	3
Verspah Oita	2017	JFL	29	0	2	0	–		0	0	31	0
Tegevajaro Miyazaki	2018	JFL	12	0	1	0	–		0	0	13	0
Tegevajaro Miyazaki	2019	JFL	24	0	0	0	–		0	0	24	0
Tegevajaro Miyazaki	2020	JFL	15	0	0	0	–		0	0	15	0
Tegevajaro Miyazaki	2021	J3 League	10	1	0	0	–		0	0	10	1
Tegevajaro Miyazaki	2022	J3 League	-	-	-	-	–		-	-	-	-
Total			61	1	1	0	0	0	0	0	62	1
Career total			176	4	5	0	0	0	0	0	181	4
