= Ren Furuyama =

Japanese footballer

Personal information
- Date of birth: 11 November 1998 (age 27)
- Place of birth: Kanagawa, Japan
- Height: 1.81 m (5 ft 11 in)
- Position: Midfielder

Team information
- Current team: YSCC Yokohama
- Number: 27

Youth career
- Sagami FC
- FC Infinite Sagamihara
- –2017: FC Gracia Sagamihara

Senior career*
Years	Team	Apps	(Gls)
2017	FC Gracia Sagamihara		
2018	Setagaya City FC		
2018	FC Gracia Sagamihara		
2019–	YSCC Yokohama	27	(0)
- * Club domestic league appearances and goals as of 17:04, 9 July 2021 (UTC)

Ren Furuyama (古山 蓮, Furuyama Ren; born 11 November 1998) is a Japanese footballer currently playing as a midfielder for YSCC Yokohama.

== Career statistics ==
=== Club ===
As of 9 July 2021.

Club	Season	League			National Cup		League Cup		Other		Total	
Club	Season	Division	Apps	Goals	Apps	Goals	Apps	Goals	Apps	Goals	Apps	Goals
YSCC Yokohama	2019	J3 League	9	0	0	0	–		0	0	9	0
YSCC Yokohama	2020	J3 League	14	0	0	0	–		0	0	14	0
YSCC Yokohama	2021	J3 League	4	0	0	0	–		0	0	4	0
Career total			27	0	0	0	0	0	0	0	27	0
