= Naoya Matsumoto =

Japanese footballer

Personal information
- Date of birth: 30 September 1997 (age 29)
- Place of birth: Wakayama, Japan
- Height: 1.79 m (5 ft 10 in)
- Position: Defender

Team information
- Current team: Kamatamare Sanuki
- Number: 3

Youth career
- –2019: Tokai Gakuen University

Senior career*
Years	Team	Apps	(Gls)
2020–	Kamatamare Sanuki	13	(0)
- * Club domestic league appearances and goals as of 17:04, 10 November 2020 (UTC)

Naoya Matsumoto (松本 直也, Matsumoto Naoya; born 30 September 1997) is a Japanese footballer currently playing as a defender for Kamatamare Sanuki.

== Career statistics ==
=== Club ===
As of 10 November 2020.

Club	Season	League			National Cup		League Cup		Other		Total	
Club	Season	Division	Apps	Goals	Apps	Goals	Apps	Goals	Apps	Goals	Apps	Goals
Kamatamare Sanuki	2020	J3 League	13	0	0	0	–		0	0	13	0
Career total			13	0	0	0	0	0	0	0	13	0
