= Kohei Hattori =

Japanese footballer

Kohei Hattori 服部康平
Personal information
- Full name: Kohei Hattori
- Date of birth: 4 April 1991 (age 35)
- Place of birth: Kawasaki, Kanagawa, Japan
- Height: 1.88 m (6 ft 2 in)
- Position: Defender

Team information
- Current team: Matsumoto Yamaga FC
- Number: 44

Youth career
- 2007–2009: Kokushikan High School

College career
Years	Team	Apps	(Gls)
2010–2013	Kokushikan University		

Senior career*
Years	Team	Apps	(Gls)
2014–2016	SC Sagamihara	66	(7)
2017–2018	Tochigi SC	61	(5)
2019–	Matsumoto Yamaga FC		
- * Club domestic league appearances and goals as of 3 January 2019

Kohei Hattori (服部康平, Hattori, Kohei; born 4 April 1991 in Kawasaki, Kanagawa) is a Japanese footballer who plays for Matsumoto Yamaga FC.

== Club statistics ==
Updated to 24 February 2019.

Appearances and goals by club, season and competition
Club	Season	League			Emperor's Cup		Total	
Club	Season	Division	Apps	Goals	Apps	Goals	Apps	Goals
SC Sagamihara	2014	J3 League	25	3	–		25	3
SC Sagamihara	2015	J3 League	18	3	–		18	3
SC Sagamihara	2016	J3 League	23	1	–		23	1
Tochigi SC	2017	J3 League	23	2	–		23	2
Tochigi SC	2018	J2 League	38	3	1	0	39	3
Career total			127	12	1	0	128	12
