= Kazuya Ando =

Japanese footballer

Personal information
- Full name: Kazuya Ando
- Date of birth: 15 July 1997 (age 29)
- Place of birth: Chiba, Japan
- Height: 1.74 m (5 ft 9 in)
- Position: Defender

Team information
- Current team: AC Nagano Parceiro
- Number: 33

Youth career
- Katsuragi FC
- –2016: JEF United Chiba

College career
Years	Team	Apps	(Gls)
2016–2019	Tokyo University of Agriculture		

Senior career*
Years	Team	Apps	(Gls)
2020–2023	Gainare Tottori	50	(3)
2023	FC Imabari	20	(2)
2024–	AC Nagano Parceiro	57	(1)
- * Club domestic league appearances and goals as of 17 August 2026

Kazuya Ando (安藤 一哉, Ando Kazuya; born 15 July 1997) is a Japanese footballer currently playing as a forward for AC Nagano Parceiro.

== Career statistics ==
=== Club ===
As of 29 October 2020.

Club	Season	League			National Cup		League Cup		Other		Total	
Club	Season	Division	Apps	Goals	Apps	Goals	Apps	Goals	Apps	Goals	Apps	Goals
Gainare Tottori	2020	J3 League	32	2	0	0	–		0	0	32	2
Gainare Tottori	2021	J3 League	9	1	2 (Note: Appearances in the Emperor's Cup)	0	–		0	0	11	1
Career total			41	3	2	0	0	0	0	0	43	3
