= Kei Munechika =

Japanese footballer

Kei Munechika 宗近 慧
Personal information
- Full name: Kei Munechika
- Date of birth: 29 May 1992 (age 34)
- Place of birth: Hiroshima, Japan
- Height: 1.82 m (6 ft 0 in)
- Position: Defender

Team information
- Current team: Kamatamare Sanuki
- Number: 3

Youth career
- 2011–2014: Hosei University

Senior career*
Years	Team	Apps	(Gls)
2015–2022	YSCC Yokohama	212	(8)
2023–	Kamatamare Sanuki	5	(0)
- * Club domestic league appearances and goals as of 22 November 2022, 16:20 (UTC)

Kei Munechika (宗近 慧, Munechika Kei; born 29 May 1992 in Hiroshima) is a Japanese footballer who plays for Kamatamare Sanuki.

== Career ==
Munechika begin first youth career with Hosei University from 2011 until 2014 after graduation at University.

Munechika begin first professional career with J3 club, YSCC Yokohama from 2015. He will leave the club in 2022 after eight seasons at Yokohama.

== Career statistics ==
As of the end 2022 season.

Club performance			League		Cup		Total	
Season	Club	League	Apps	Goals	Apps	Goals	Apps	Goals
Japan			League		Emperor's Cup		Total	
2015	YSCC Yokohama	J3 League	31	1	–		31	1
2016	YSCC Yokohama	J3 League	22	1	–		22	1
2017	YSCC Yokohama	J3 League	29	3	1	0	30	3
2018	YSCC Yokohama	J3 League	32	1	2	1	34	2
2019	YSCC Yokohama	J3 League	26	0	0	0	26	0
2020	YSCC Yokohama	J3 League	21	0	–		21	0
2021	YSCC Yokohama	J3 League	26	2	2	0	28	2
2022	YSCC Yokohama	J3 League	25	0	0	0	25	0
2023	Kamatamare Sanuki	J3 League	0	0	0	0	0	0
Career total			212	8	5	1	217	9
