= Kazuki Kijima =

Japanese footballer

Personal information
- Date of birth: 29 August 1998 (age 28)
- Place of birth: Chiba, Japan
- Height: 1.75 m (5 ft 9 in)
- Position: Midfielder

Team information
- Current team: Azul Claro Numazu
- Number: 31

Youth career
- –2016: Kashiwa Reysol
- 2017–2020: Juntendo University

Senior career*
| Years | Team | Apps | (Gls) |
| 2021– | Azul Claro Numazu | 1 | (0) |
- * Club domestic league appearances and goals as of 17:04, 20 March 2021 (UTC)

Kazuki Kijima (鬼島 和希, Kijima Kazuki; born 29 August 1998) is a Japanese footballer currently playing as a midfielder for Azul Claro Numazu.

== Career statistics ==
=== Club ===
As of 20 March 2021.

| Club | Season | League | | | National Cup | | League Cup | | Other | | Total | |
| Club | Season | Division | Apps | Goals | Apps | Goals | Apps | Goals | Apps | Goals | Apps | Goals |
|---|---|---|---|---|---|---|---|---|---|---|---|---|
| Azul Claro Numazu | 2021 | J3 League | 1 | 0 | 0 | 0 | – | | 0 | 0 | 1 | 0 |
| Career total | | | 1 | 0 | 0 | 0 | 0 | 0 | 0 | 0 | 1 | 0 |
