= Shuntaro Kawabe =

Japanese footballer

Shuntaro Kawabe 河辺 駿太郎
Personal information
- Date of birth: 26 May 1996 (age 30)
- Place of birth: Oita, Japan
- Height: 1.66 m (5 ft 5 in)
- Position: Forward

Team information
- Current team: Giravanz Kitakyushu
- Number: 9

Youth career
- Soda SSC
- –2011: FC Regate
- 2012–2014: Oita Nishi High School

College career
Years	Team	Apps	(Gls)
2015–2018	Meiji University		

Senior career*
Years	Team	Apps	(Gls)
2019	FV Diefflen	11	(1)
2019–2020	TSG Pfeddersheim	18	(6)
2020	J-Lease FC		
2021–2022	YSCC Yokohama	48	(6)
2023–2024	Kagoshima United FC	15	(1)
2024	→ Iwate Grulla Morioka (loan)	14	(4)
2025–	Giravanz Kitakyushu	36	(5)
- * Club domestic league appearances and goals as of 24 August 2026

Shuntaro Kawabe (河辺 駿太郎, Kawabe Shuntaro; born 26 May 1996) is a Japanese footballer who plays as a forward for Giravanz Kitakyushu.

== Career statistics ==
As of 21 May 2021

Appearances and goals by club, season and competition
Club	Season	League			National cup		League cup		Other		Total	
Club	Season	Division	Apps	Goals	Apps	Goals	Apps	Goals	Apps	Goals	Apps	Goals
FV Diefflen	2018–19	Oberliga Rheinland-Pfalz/Saar	11	1	0	0	–		0	0	11	1
TSG Pfeddersheim	2019–20	Oberliga Rheinland-Pfalz/Saar	18	6	0	0	–		0	0	18	6
YSCC Yokohama	2021	J3 League	7	0	0	0	–		0	0	7	0
Career total			36	7	0	0	0	0	0	0	36	7
