= Kōdai Minoda =

Japanese footballer (born 1999)

Kōdai Minoda 蓑田 広大
Personal information
- Date of birth: 10 August 1999 (age 27)
- Place of birth: Yokohama, Kanagawa, Japan
- Height: 1.80 m (5 ft 11 in)
- Position: Centre back

Team information
- Current team: Matsumoto Yamaga FC
- Number: 4

Youth career
- Tsurumi Higashi FC
- Mamedo FC
- 2015–2017: Aomori Yamada High School

College career
Years	Team	Apps	(Gls)
2018–2021	Hosei University		

Senior career*
Years	Team	Apps	(Gls)
2021–2026	Shonan Bellmare	7	(0)
2022	→ SC Sagamihara (loan)	6	(0)
2023–2025	→ Vanraure Hachinohe (loan)	104	(3)
2026–	Matsumoto Yamaga FC	0	(0)
- * Club domestic league appearances and goals as of 7 July 2026

Kōdai Minoda (蓑田 広大, Minoda Kōdai; born 10 August 1999) is a Japanese footballer currently playing as a centre back for J3 League club Matsumoto Yamaga FC.

== Club career ==
Minoda began his youth career with Tsurumi Higashi FC and Mamedo FC. Later, he joined Aomori Yamada High School, graduating on 2017.

In 2018, Minoda entered Hosei University, studying and playing for its football team. At 24 February 2021, during his graduation year, he was approved as a specially-designated player for Shonan Bellmare, and was scheduled to fully join the club on 2022, when he ultimately joined.

In 2022, Minoda began his professional career with the J1 club, Shonan Bellmare. On 23 February, he debuted against Avispa Fukuoka in J. League Cup, in the Matchweek 1 Group Stage.

On 7 June 2022, Shonan Bellmare loaned Minoda to the J3 club, SC Sagamihara for mid of the 2022 season.

On 17 December 2022, Minoda was loaned again to the J3 club, Vanraure Hachinohe for the 2023 season. Minoda extended his loan twice more and ended up making over 100 appearances for Vanraure Hachinohe over three seasons. In December 2025, it was announced he would be returning to Shonan Bellmare.

In June 2026, it was announced that Minoda would join Matsumoto Yamaga for the 2026–27 season.

== Career statistics ==
=== Club ===
As of 7 July 2026.

Appearances and goals by club, season and competition
Club	Season	League			National cup (Note: Includes Emperors Cup)		League cup (Note: Includes J.League Cup)		Total	
Club	Season	Division	Apps	Goals	Apps	Goals	Apps	Goals	Apps	Goals
Hosei University	2019	–			0	0	–		0	0
Shonan Bellmare	2022	J1 League	1	0	1	0	1	0	3	0
SC Sagamihara (loan)	2022	J3 League	6	0	0	0	–		6	0
Vanraure Hachinohe (loan)	2023	J3 League	31	1	1	0	0	0	32	1
Vanraure Hachinohe (loan)	2024	J3 League	36	1	1	0	2	0	39	1
Vanraure Hachinohe (loan)	2025	J3 League	37	1	0	0	1	0	38	1
Vanraure Hachinohe (loan)	Total		104	3	2	0	3	0	109	3
Shonan Bellmare	2026	J2/J3 (100)	6	0	0	0	0	0	6	0
Career total			117	3	3	0	4	0	124	3
