= Kenta Watanabe =

Japanese footballer

Kenta Watanabe 渡辺 健太
Personal information
- Date of birth: 28 April 1998 (age 28)
- Place of birth: Wakayama, Wakayama, Japan
- Height: 1.90 m (6 ft 3 in)
- Position: Goalkeeper

Team information
- Current team: Azul Claro Numazu
- Number: 1

Youth career
- Kainan FC
- 2011–2016: Gamba Osaka

Senior career*
Years	Team	Apps	(Gls)
2017–2020	Machida Zelvia	0	(0)
2020	→ Fukushima United (loan)	12	(0)
2021–2022	Kamatamare Sanuki	5	(0)
2023–	Azul Claro Numazu	45	(0)
- * Club domestic league appearances and goals as of 1 January 2026

Kenta Watanabe (渡辺 健太, Watanabe Kenta; born 28 April 1998) is a Japanese footballer currently playing as a goalkeeper for Azul Claro Numazu.

== Career statistics ==
=== Club ===
As of the start from 2023 season.

Club	Season	League			National Cup		League Cup		Other		Total	
Club	Season	Division	Apps	Goals	Apps	Goals	Apps	Goals	Apps	Goals	Apps	Goals
Machida Zelvia	2017	J2 League	0	0	0	0	0	0	0	0	0	0
Machida Zelvia	2018	J2 League	0	0	0	0	0	0	0	0	0	0
Machida Zelvia	2019	J2 League	0	0	0	0	0	0	0	0	0	0
Machida Zelvia	2020	J2 League	0	0	0	0	0	0	0	0	0	0
Machida Zelvia	Total		0	0	0	0	0	0	0	0	0	0
Fukushima United (loan)	2020	J3 League	12	0	0	0	–		0	0	12	0
Kamatamare Sanuki	2021	J3 League	3	0	0	0	–		0	0	2	0
Kamatamare Sanuki	2022	J3 League	0	0	0	0	–		0	0	0	0
Azul Claro Numazu	2023	J3 League	0	0	0	0	–		0	0	0	0
Career total			15	0	0	0	0	0	0	0	15	0
