= Kazuya Sunamori =

Japanese footballer (born 1990)

Kazuya Sunamori 砂森 和也
Personal information
- Full name: Kazuya Sunamori
- Date of birth: 2 September 1990 (age 36)
- Place of birth: Chiba, Japan
- Height: 1.71 m (5 ft 7 in)
- Position: Defender

Team information
- Current team: Nagano Parceiro
- Number: 24

Youth career
- 2003–2008: JEF United Chiba

College career
Years	Team	Apps	(Gls)
2009–2012	Juntendo University		

Senior career*
Years	Team	Apps	(Gls)
2013–2015	Honda FC	79	(13)
2016–2017	Kamatamare Sanuki	13	(0)
2018	Azul Claro Numazu	31	(2)
2019–2022	Kagoshima United FC	102	(3)
2023–	Nagano Parceiro	34	(1)
- * Club domestic league appearances and goals as of 1 January 2026

Kazuya Sunamori (砂森 和也, Sunamori Kazuya; born 2 September 1990 in Chiba, Chiba) is a Japanese footballer who plays for Nagano Parceiro.

== Early life ==
Kazuya was born in Chiba. He played for JEF United Youth and studied at Juntendo University.

== Career ==
Kazuya started his career with Honda FC.

Kazuya made his debut for Kamatamare on 28 February 2016, coming off in the 21st minute for Yuki Ozawa.

Kazuya made his debut for Azul on 11 March 2018. He scored his first goal for Azul on 21 July 2018, scoring in the 48th minute.

Kazuya made his debut for Kagoshima against Tokushima Vortis on 24 February 2019. He scored his first goal for Kagoshima against Gamba Osaka U-23 on 13 December 2020, scoring in the 78th minute.

Kazuya made his debut for Nagano against Tegevajaro Miyazaki on 5 March 2023.

== Career statistics ==
Updated to the start from 2023 season.

Appearances and goals by club, season and competition
Club	Season	League			Emperor's Cup		Total	
Club	Season	Division	Apps	Goals	Apps	Goals	Apps	Goals
Honda FC	2013	JFL	26	3	–		26	3
Honda FC	2014	JFL	23	6	–		23	6
Honda FC	2015	JFL	30	4	–		30	4
Kamatamare Sanuki	2016	J2 League	13	0	0	0	13	0
Kamatamare Sanuki	2017	J2 League	0	0	0	0	0	0
Azul Claro Numazu	2018	J3 League	31	2	–		13	0
Kagoshima United	2019	J2 League	42	0	–		42	0
Kagoshima United	2020	J3 League	32	2	–		32	2
Kagoshima United	2021	J3 League	20	1	–		20	1
Kagoshima United	2022	J3 League	8	0	2	0	10	0
Nagano Parceiro	2023	J3 League	0	0	0	0	0	0
Career total			225	18	2	0	227	18
