= Takuya Miyamoto (footballer, born 1993) =

Japanese footballer (born 1993)

Takuya Miyamoto 宮本 拓弥
Personal information
- Full name: Takuya Miyamoto
- Date of birth: May 21, 1993 (age 33)
- Place of birth: Chiba, Japan
- Height: 1.83 m (6 ft 0 in)
- Position: Forward

Team information
- Current team: Shibuya City

Youth career
- 2012–2015: Waseda University

Senior career*
Years	Team	Apps	(Gls)
2016–2019	Mito HollyHock	47	(3)
2020	YSCC Yokohama	34	(14)
2021	Fujieda MYFC	17	(3)
2022	Nagano Parceiro	29	(2)
2023	Vanraure Hachinohe	23	(3)
2024–	Shibuya City		
- * Club domestic league appearances and goals as of 14:24, 4 September 2024 (UTC)

Takuya Miyamoto (宮本 拓弥, Miyamoto Takuya; born May 21, 1993) is a Japanese football player who currently plays for Vanraure Hachinohe.

== University career ==
Miyamoto scored on his debut. He also used to play as a CB but converted to a forward.

== Career ==
=== Mito HollyHock ===
Takuya Miyamoto joined J2 League club Mito HollyHock in 2016. He scored on his league debut against Fagiano Okayama on 20 March 2016, scoring in the 90th+2nd minute.

=== YSCC ===
Miyamoto made his league debut against SC Sagamihara on 27 June 2020. He scored his first goal against Kataller Toyama on 5 July 2020, scoring in the 19th minute.

=== Fujieda MYFC ===
On 12 January 2021, Miyamoto was announced at Fujieda MYFC. He made his league debut against Fukushima United on 14 March 2021. Miyamoto scored his first league goal against Kamatamare Sanuki on 4 April 2021, scoring in the 35th minute.

=== Loan to Nagano Parceiro ===
On 22 December 2021, Miyamoto was announced at Nagano Parceiro. He scored on his league debut against Giravanz Kitakyushu on 13 March 2022, scoring in the 56th minute.

=== Vanraure Hachinohe ===
On 18 December 2022, Miyamoto was announced at Vanraure Hachinohe. He made his league debut against FC Ryukyu on 4 March 2023. Miyamoto scored his first league goal against Giravanz Kitakyushu on 2 April 2023, scoring in the 11th minute. On 28 November 2023, it was announced that Vanraure Hachinohe would not be renewing his contract for the 2024 season.

=== Shibuya City ===
On 8 February 2024, Miyamoto was announced at Shibuya City FC.

== International career ==
Miyamoto was part of the team that took part in the 2011 Dallas Cup.

== Career statistics ==
Updated to January 1, 2021.

Appearances and goals by club, season and competition
Club	Season	League			Emperor's Cup		Total	
Club	Season	Division	Apps	Goals	Apps	Goals	Apps	Goals
Mito HollyHock	2016	J2 League	16	2	0	0	16	2
Mito HollyHock	2017	J2 League	6	0	1	0	7	0
Mito HollyHock	2018	J2 League	24	1	2	1	26	2
Mito HollyHock	2019	J2 League	1	0	1	0	2	0
YSCC Yokohama	2020	J3 League	34	14	–		34	14
Career total			81	17	4	1	85	18
