= Hikaru Arai =

Japanese footballer (born 1999)

Hikaru Arai 新井 光
Personal information
- Full name: Hikaru Arai
- Date of birth: 14 April 1999 (age 27)
- Place of birth: Nagano, Nagano, Japan
- Height: 1.74 m (5 ft 8 1/2 in)
- Positions: Attacking midfielder; winger

Team information
- Current team: FC Imabari
- Number: 5

Youth career
- 2012–2015: Nagano Parceiro
- 2015–2017: Ichiritsu Nagano High School

Senior career*
Years	Team	Apps	(Gls)
2018–2022	Shonan Bellmare	1	(0)
2020–2021	→ Gainare Tottori (loan)	39	(4)
2022	→ Fukushima United FC (loan)	30	(3)
2023–	FC Imabari	105	(6)
Medal record
Shonan Bellmare
Winner	J.League Cup	2018
- * Club domestic league appearances and goals as of 17 August 2026

Hikaru Arai (新井 光, Arai Hikaru; born April 14, 1999) is a Japanese footballer who plays as a midfielder for J2 League club, FC Imabari.

== Early life ==
Hikaru was born in Nagano. He played for Nagano Parceiro and Ichiritsu Nagano High School in his youth. Hikaru was called up to the Japan U-15s and U-16s.

== Career ==
While attending Ichiritsu Nagano High School, Shonan Bellmare chose him as a special designated player since April 2017, before seeing him joining the top team the successive year. He made his league debut for Shonan against FC Tokyo on the 18 March 2018.

Hikaru joined Gainare Tottori and made his league debut for Gainare against Cerezo Osaka U-23 on the 27 June 2020. He scored his first goal for the club against Fujieda MYFC on the 2 September 2020, scoring in the 90th+1st minute.

Hikaru joined Fukushima United FC and made his league debut for Fukushima against FC Imabari on the 13 March 2022. He scored his first goal for the club against Azul Claro Numazu on the 19 March 2022, scoring in the 44th minute.

On 16 December 2022, Arai transferred to FC Imabari for the upcoming 2023 season. He made his league debut for the club against Fukushima United on the 5 March 2023. He scored his first goal for the club against Vanraure Hachinohe on the 23 September 2023, scoring in the 40th minute.

== Career statistics ==
As of 5 March 2023.

Appearances and goals by club, season and competition
Club	Season	League			Emperor's Cup		J.League Cup		Total	
Club	Season	Division	Apps	Goals	Apps	Goals	Apps	Goals	Apps	Goals
Shonan Bellmare	2018	J1 League	1	0	0	0	5	0	6	0
Shonan Bellmare	2019	J1 League	0	0	1	0	2	0	3	0
Shonan Bellmare	Total		1	0	1	0	7	0	9	0
Gainare Tottori (loan)	2020	J3 League	32	2	0	0	–		32	2
Gainare Tottori (loan)	2021	J3 League	7	2	0	0	–		7	2
Gainare Tottori (loan)	Total		39	4	0	0	0	0	39	4
Fukushima United FC (loan)	2022	J3 League	30	3	2	0	–		32	3
FC Imabari	2023	J3 League	1	0	0	0	0	0	1	0
Career total			71	7	3	0	7	0	81	7

== Honours ==
Shonan Bellmare

- J.League Cup: 2018, 2019 J.League Cup (runners-up)
