= Kazuki Okayama =

Japanese footballer

Personal information
- Date of birth: 16 February 1994 (age 32)
- Place of birth: Kanagawa, Japan
- Height: 1.80 m (5 ft 11 in)
- Position: Midfielder

Team information
- Current team: FC Imabari
- Number: 20

Youth career
- –2015: Osaka Sangyo University

Senior career*
Years	Team	Apps	(Gls)
2016–	FC Imabari	54	(5)
- * Club domestic league appearances and goals as of 17:04, 12 November 2020 (UTC)

Kazuki Okayama (岡山 和輝, Okayama Kazuki; born 16 February 1994) is a Japanese footballer playing as a midfielder for FC Imabari.

== Career statistics ==
=== Club ===
As of 12 November 2020.

Club	Season	League			National Cup		League Cup		Other		Total	
Club	Season	Division	Apps	Goals	Apps	Goals	Apps	Goals	Apps	Goals	Apps	Goals
FC Imabari	2016	Shikoku Soccer League	12	4	1 (Note: Appearance(s) in Emperor's Cup)	0	–		6 (Note: Appearance(s) in Japanese Regional Football League Competition)	0	7	0
FC Imabari	2017	JFL	8	0	2	0	–		0	0	10	0
FC Imabari	2018	JFL	4	0	0	0	–		0	0	4	0
FC Imabari	2019	JFL	7	0	0	0	–		0	0	7	0
FC Imabari	2020	J3 League	23	1	0	0	–		0	0	23	1
Career total			54	5	3	0	0	0	6	0	63	5
