= Ko Watahiki =

Japanese footballer

Personal information
- Date of birth: 21 January 1998 (age 28)
- Place of birth: Ibaraki, Japan
- Height: 1.73 m (5 ft 8 in)
- Position: Defender

Team information
- Current team: SC Sagamihara
- Number: 2

Youth career
- –2012: Kashima Antlers
- 2013–2015: Maebashi Ikuei High School

College career
Years	Team	Apps	(Gls)
2016–2019	NIFS Kanoya		

Senior career*
Years	Team	Apps	(Gls)
2020–2022	Tegevajaro Miyazaki	42	(0)
2023–	SC Sagamihara	77	(4)
- * Club domestic league appearances and goals as of 17 August 2026

Ko Watahiki (綿引 康, Watahiki Ko; born 21 January 1998) is a Japanese footballer currently playing as a right-back for SC Sagamihara from 2023.

== Career statistics ==
=== Club ===
As of the end 2022 season.

Club	Season	League			National Cup		League Cup		Other		Total	
Club	Season	Division	Apps	Goals	Apps	Goals	Apps	Goals	Apps	Goals	Apps	Goals
N.I.F.S. Kanoya	2019	–			3 (Note: Appearances in the Emperor's Cup)	0	–		0	0	3	0
N.I.F.S. Kanoya	Total		0	0	3	0	0	0	0	0	3	0
Tegevajaro Miyazaki	2020	JFL	6	0	1	0	–		0	0	7	0
Tegevajaro Miyazaki	2021	J3 League	19	0	0	0	–		0	0	19	0
Tegevajaro Miyazaki	2022	J3 League	17	0	0	0	–		0	0	17	0
SC Sagamihara	2023	J3 League	0	0	0	0	–		0	0	0	0
SC Sagamihara	Total		42	0	1	0	0	0	0	0	43	0
Career total			42	0	4	0	0	0	0	0	46	0
