= Yuya Ono =

Japanese footballer

Yuya Ono 大野 佑哉
Personal information
- Date of birth: 17 August 1996 (age 30)
- Place of birth: Tokyo, Japan
- Height: 1.79 m (5 ft 10 in)
- Position: Defender

Team information
- Current team: Nagano Parceiro
- Number: 7

Youth career
- Reysol SS Ome
- –2012: AZ'86 Tokyo Ome
- 2013–2015: Yamanashi Gakuin Univ. High School

College career
| Years | Team | Apps | (Gls) |
| 2015–2018 | Hannan University | | |

Senior career*
| Years | Team | Apps | (Gls) |
| 2019–2022 | Matsumoto Yamaga | 86 | (2) |
| 2023– | Nagano Parceiro | 87 | (1) |
- * Club domestic league appearances and goals as of 17 August 2026

Yuya Ono (大野 佑哉, Ono Yuya; born 17 August 1996) is a Japanese footballer currently playing as a right back for Nagano Parceiro from 2023.

== Career ==
After graduation at High School. On 11 October 2018, Ono begin first professional career with Matsumoto Yamaga from 2019.

In 2022, Ono participated in 31 games as a top team, but on November 22 at same year, he was announced expire contract at club. On 20 December at same year, Ono officially transfer to Nagano rival club, Nagano Parceiro for upcoming 2023 season.

== Career statistics ==
=== Club ===
As of the end 2022 season.

| Club | Season | League | | | National Cup | | League Cup | | Other | | Total | |
| Club | Season | Division | Apps | Goals | Apps | Goals | Apps | Goals | Apps | Goals | Apps | Goals |
|---|---|---|---|---|---|---|---|---|---|---|---|---|
| Matsumoto Yamaga | 2019 | J1 League | 0 | 0 | 0 | 0 | 0 | 0 | 0 | 0 | 0 | 0 |
| Matsumoto Yamaga | 2020 | J2 League | 28 | 1 | 0 | 0 | 0 | 0 | 0 | 0 | 28 | 1 |
| Matsumoto Yamaga | 2021 | J2 League | 27 | 1 | 1 | 0 | 0 | 0 | 0 | 0 | 28 | 1 |
| Matsumoto Yamaga | 2022 | J3 League | 31 | 0 | 0 | 0 | 0 | 0 | 0 | 0 | 31 | 0 |
| Nagano Parceiro | 2023 | J3 League | 0 | 0 | 0 | 0 | 0 | 0 | 0 | 0 | 0 | 0 |
| Career total | | | 86 | 2 | 1 | 0 | 0 | 0 | 0 | 0 | 87 | 2 |
