= Ryusei Nose =

Japanese footballer

Personal information
- Full name: Ryusei Nose
- Date of birth: 8 February 2000 (age 26)
- Place of birth: Hokkaido, Japan
- Height: 1.68 m (5 ft 6 in)
- Position: Midfielder

Team information
- Current team: FC Osaka
- Number: 41

Youth career
- –2014: R. Supelbe Kushiro
- 2015–2017: Tokai Univ. Sapporo High School

College career
Years	Team	Apps	(Gls)
2018–2021	Sapporo University		

Senior career*
Years	Team	Apps	(Gls)
2021–2022	Vanraure Hachinohe	25	(4)
2023	Giravanz Kitakyushu	35	(4)
2024-2026	Mito HollyHock	20	(1)
2025	→ FC Osaka (loan)	16	(0)
2026-	FC Osaka	20	(0)
- * Club domestic league appearances and goals as of 18 August 2026

Ryusei Nose (野瀬 龍世, Nose Ryusei; born 8 February 2000) is a Japanese footballer currently playing as a midfielder for FC Osaka.

== Career ==
He used to play for Vanraure Hachinohe as a designated special player.

== Career statistics ==
=== Club ===
As of 19 September 2021.

Club	Season	League			National Cup		League Cup		Other		Total	
Club	Season	Division	Apps	Goals	Apps	Goals	Apps	Goals	Apps	Goals	Apps	Goals
Sapporo University	2020	–			1 (Note: Appearances in the Emperor's Cup)	0	–		0	0	1	0
Vanraure Hachinohe	2021	J3 League	1	0	0	0	–		0	0	1	0
Career total			1	0	1	0	0	0	0	0	2	0
