= Ryoya Iizumi =

Japanese footballer

Personal information
- Date of birth: 28 December 1995 (age 30)
- Place of birth: Hachiōji, Tokyo, Japan
- Height: 1.81 m (5 ft 11 in)
- Position: Forward

Team information
- Current team: Blaublitz Akita
- Number: 3

Youth career
- FC Sugino
- –2014: Mitsubishi Yowa

College career
Years	Team	Apps	(Gls)
2014–2017	Waseda University		

Senior career*
Years	Team	Apps	(Gls)
2018–2022	FC Imabari	56	(13)
2023	Gainare Tottori	21	(0)
2024–2025	Mito HollyHock	15	(0)
2025	→ Blaublitz Akita (loan)	14	(3)
2026–	Blaublitz Akita	17	(1)
- * Club domestic league appearances and goals as of 14 August 2026

Ryoya Iizumi (飯泉 涼矢, Iizumi Ryōya; born 28 December 1995) is a Japanese footballer currently playing as a forward for Blaublitz Akita.

== Career statistics ==
=== Club ===
As of 10 November 2020.

Club	Season	League			National Cup		League Cup		Other		Total	
Club	Season	Division	Apps	Goals	Apps	Goals	Apps	Goals	Apps	Goals	Apps	Goals
FC Imabari	2018	JFL	14	6	0	0	–		0	0	14	6
FC Imabari	2019	JFL	20	4	0	0	–		0	0	20	4
FC Imabari	2020	J3 League	22	3	0	0	–		0	0	22	3
Career total			56	13	0	0	0	0	0	0	56	13
