= Tatsuya Shirai (footballer) =

Japanese footballer (born 1997)

Personal information
- Date of birth: 5 April 1997 (age 29)
- Place of birth: Kawasaki, Kanagawa, Japan
- Height: 1.80 m (5 ft 11 in)
- Position: Defender

Team information
- Current team: Matsumoto Yamaga FC
- Number: 5

Youth career
- 2013–2015: Ichiritsu Funabashi High School

College career
Years	Team	Apps	(Gls)
2016–2019	Kanagawa University		

Senior career*
Years	Team	Apps	(Gls)
2020–2023	SC Sagamihara	63	(2)
2023–2024	FC Imabari	29	(0)
2025	Vanraure Hachinohe	38	(3)
2026–	Matsumoto Yamaga FC	23	(1)
- * Club domestic league appearances and goals as of 24 August 2026

Tatsuya Shirai (白井 達也, Shirai Tatsuya; born 5 April 1997) is a Japanese footballer currently playing as a defender for Matsumoto Yamaga FC.

== Career statistics ==
=== Club ===
As of 13 November 2020.

Club	Season	League			National Cup		League Cup		Other		Total	
Club	Season	Division	Apps	Goals	Apps	Goals	Apps	Goals	Apps	Goals	Apps	Goals
SC Sagamihara	2020	J3 League	19	1	0	0	–		0	0	19	1
Career total			19	1	0	0	0	0	0	0	19	1
