= Genichi Endo =

Japanese footballer

Genichi Endo 遠藤 元一
Personal information
- Full name: Genichi Endo
- Date of birth: September 9, 1994 (age 32)
- Place of birth: Hokkaido, Japan
- Height: 1.78 m (5 ft 10 in)
- Position: Defender

Team information
- Current team: ReinMeer Aomori
- Number: 3

Youth career
- 2010–2012: Asahikawa Jitsugyo High School

College career
Years	Team	Apps	(Gls)
2013–2016	Sanno Institute of Management		

Senior career*
Years	Team	Apps	(Gls)
2017–2020	AC Nagano Parceiro	40	(1)
2021–2022	Kamatamare Sanuki	61	(2)
2023–2024	FC Gifu	31	(3)
2025–	ReinMeer Aomori	2	(0)
- * Club domestic league appearances and goals as of 16 March 2025

Genichi Endo (遠藤 元一, Endō Gen'ichi; born September 9, 1994) is a Japanese football player who plays for ReinMeer Aomori.

== Career ==
Genichi Endo joined J3 League club AC Nagano Parceiro in 2017.

== Club statistics ==
Updated to 22 February 2019.

Club performance			League		Cup		Total	
Season	Club	League	Apps	Goals	Apps	Goals	Apps	Goals
Japan			League		Emperor's Cup		Total	
2017	Nagano Parceiro	J3 League	9	0	3	0	12	0
2018	Nagano Parceiro	J3 League	6	0	2	0	8	0
Total			15	0	5	0	20	0
