= Momoyama Gakuin University =

Private University in Izumi, Osaka

Coordinates: 34°27′03″N 135°27′20″E

- 桃山学院大学
- Motto: SEQUIMINI ME
- Type: Private
- Established: Founded 1884, Chartered 1959
- President: Kichizo Akashi
- Location: Izumi, Osaka, Japan
- Campus: Suburban
- Mascot: None
- Website: andrew.ac.jp

Momoyama Gakuin University (桃山学院大学, Momoyama gakuin daigaku), also known as Saint Andrew's University, is a private university, established under Anglican Christian auspices, in Izumi, Osaka.

== History ==
The university was granted its charter in 1959.

== Organization ==
=== Faculties ===
- International Studies and Liberal Arts
- Sociology
- Economics
- Business Administration
- Law

=== Graduate schools ===
- Letters
- Sociology
- Economics
- Business Administration

== Activities ==
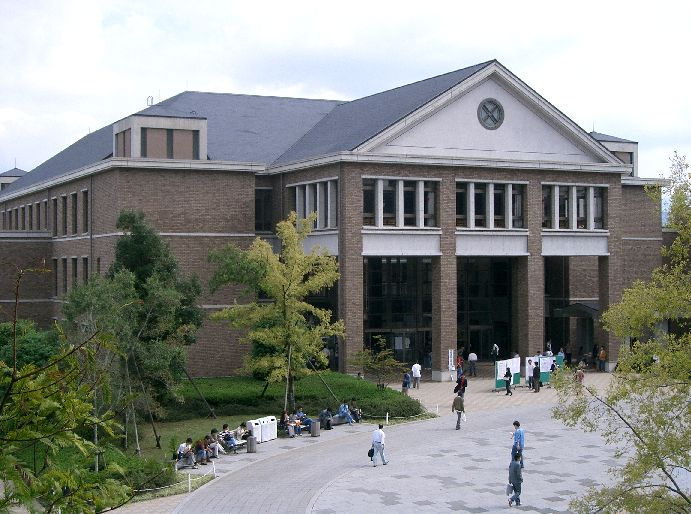
Momoyama Gakuin University

The university has a large variety of sports teams including:: archery, aikido, American football, karate, Japanese fencing, tennis, baseball, golf, cycling, automobile, jyudo, weight lifting, softball, swimming, cross-country skiing, table tennis, soft tennis, kenpo, basketball, badminton, volleyball, fencing, ten-pin bowling, boxing, rugby, athletic sports, wrestling, ice hockey, lacrosse and cheerleading.

It also has cultural groups, including: English studying society, Juvenile literature research, glee, light music, wind-instrument, fork music, movie research, drama, advertising research, tea ceremony, photograph department, calligraphy, art, chess club, fishing research, railway research, buraku liberation research, student broadcasting station and Momoyama publishing association.

== Exchange students ==
Momoyama Gakuin university has partnerships in the world with: Canada, United Kingdom, Germany, France, Austria, the Netherlands, Italy, Spain, Sweden, Finland, Czech republic, Russia, Poland, Canada, USA, Korea, China, Taiwan, Vietnam, Indonesia, India, Australia. All exchange students have to study Japanese.
