= Kensei Ukita =

Japanese footballer

Kensei Ukita 浮田 健誠
Personal information
- Full name: Kensei Ukita
- Date of birth: June 12, 1997 (age 29)
- Place of birth: Chiba, Japan
- Height: 1.84 m (6 ft 1/2 in)
- Position: Forward

Team information
- Current team: AC Nagano Parceiro
- Number: 18

Youth career
- –2012: Minato SC
- 2013–2015: Kashiwa Reysol

College career
Years	Team	Apps	(Gls)
2016–2019	Juntendo University		

Senior career*
Years	Team	Apps	(Gls)
2015	Kashiwa Reysol	0	(0)
2020–2021	Renofa Yamaguchi	52	(9)
2022	SC Sagamihara	27	(1)
2023	FC Gifu	22	(0)
2024–	AC Nagano Parceiro	63	(16)
Total		164	(26)
- * Club domestic league appearances and goals as of 1 January 2026

Kensei Ukita (浮田 健誠, Ukita Kensei; born June 12, 1997) is a Japanese football player for AC Nagano Parceiro.

== Career ==
Ukita was born in Chiba Prefecture on June 12, 1997. He came through the youth team at Kashiwa Reysol based in his local. He was promoted to the top team ahead of the 2015 season. He made his official debut for Kashiwa Reysol, AFC Champions League on 6 May 2015 against the Vietnam-based club Binh Duong in Go Dau Stadium in Thu Dau Mot, Vietnam. In the 85th minute Ukita subbed in for Koki Oshima. Ukita and his club lost the match 1-0.
