= List of J3 League football transfers winter 2019–20 =

This is a list of Japanese football J3 League transfers in the winter transfer window 2019–20 by club.

== J3 League ==
=== Kagoshima United FC ===
In: Note: Flags indicate national team as defined under FIFA eligibility rules; some limited exceptions apply. Players may hold more than one non-FIFA nationality.

No.	Pos.	Nation	Player
1	GK	JPN	Kazusa Iwasaki (from (Japan) FC Maruyasu Okazaki, end of loan)
2	DF	BRA	Foguete (from (Brazil) FC Cascavel)
4	DF	JPN	Kotaro Fujiwara (on loan from (Japan) Tochigi SC)
6	MF	JPN	Keisuke Tanabe (from (Japan) Roasso Kumamoto)
7	MF	JPN	Kento Nakamura (from Meiji University)
19	FW	BRA	João Gabriel (from (Japan) SC Sagamihara)
22	DF	JPN	Naoaki Aoyama (from (Japan) Gamba Osaka)
27	MF	JPN	Haruki Izawa (on loan from (Japan) Urawa Red Diamonds)
30	FW	JPN	Yuma Kawamori (from (Japan) Azul Claro Numazu, end of loan)
31	GK	JPN	Minoru Hata (from (Japan) Roasso Kumamoto)
41	MF	JPN	Kaito Miyake (from (Japan) Tochigi SC)
50	MF	JPN	Kenji Baba (from (Japan) Oita Trinita)

Out: Note: Flags indicate national team as defined under FIFA eligibility rules; some limited exceptions apply. Players may hold more than one non-FIFA nationality.

No.	Pos.	Nation	Player
1	GK	JPN	Tetsuya Yamaoka (to (Japan) FC Kariya)
3	DF	JPN	Isao Taniguchi (retired)
4	MF	JPN	Rei Hirakawa (to (Japan) FC Tokyo, end of loan)
6	DF	JPN	Shuto Tanaka (retired)
7	MF	JPN	Akira Akao (retired)
8	MF	JPN	Yuki Nagahata (retired)
13	GK	KOR	Ahn Joon-soo (to (Japan) Cerezo Osaka, end of loan)
14	MF	JPN	Kenta Nishioka (retired)
17	MF	JPN	Yusei Nakahara (retired)
19	DF	JPN	Shunsuke Tsutsumi (retired)
22	MF	JPN	Kosuke Yoshii (retired)
27	DF	JPN	Shinji Tominari (retired)
28	FW	JPN	Han Yong-thae (to (Japan) Matsumoto Yamaga, end of loan)
29	GK	JPN	Haruki Saruta (to (Japan) Kashiwa Reysol, end of loan)
33	MF	JPN	Yutaka Tanoue (retired)
49	FW	JPN	Lucão (on loan to (Japan) Zweigen Kanazawa)
—	DF	JPN	Masafumi Terada (to (Japan) Veertien Mie, previously on loan)
—	MF	JPN	Ryota Kamino (to (Japan) Tegevajaro Miyazaki)
—	MF	JPN	Masaki Sakamoto (to (Japan) FC Maruyasu Okazaki, previously on loan)
—	FW	JPN	Takayuki Fujii (retired)

=== FC Gifu ===
In: Note: Flags indicate national team as defined under FIFA eligibility rules; some limited exceptions apply. Players may hold more than one non-FIFA nationality.

No.	Pos.	Nation	Player
2	DF	JPN	Wataru Hashimoto (from (Japan) Vissel Kobe)
9	FW	JPN	Hiroyuki Takasaki (from (Japan) Matsumoto Yamaga)
15	FW	JPN	Bright Machida (from Japan Soccer College)
18	FW	JPN	Daichi Ishikawa (from (Japan) Azul Claro Numazu, end of loan)
23	MF	JPN	Ryotaro Onishi (from Hosei University)
25	DF	JPN	Takuya Hashiguchi (from (Japan) Kashiwa Reysol)
29	GK	KOR	Park Seong-su (on loan from (Japan) Ehime FC)
30	MF	KOR	Kim Ho (from Korea University)
31	GK	JPN	Takuya Matsumoto (from (Japan) Blaublitz Akita)
—	FW	JPN	Kento Yabuuchi (from (Japan) Iwate Grulla Morioka, end of loan)

Out: Note: Flags indicate national team as defined under FIFA eligibility rules; some limited exceptions apply. Players may hold more than one non-FIFA nationality.

No.	Pos.	Nation	Player
2	DF	JPN	Masanori Abe (retired)
8	MF	GAB	Frédéric Bulot (to (Malaysia) FELDA United)
10	FW	NZL	Ryan de Vries (to (Republic of Ireland) Sligo Rovers)
23	MF	JPN	Yuto Ono (to (Thailand) Samut Prakan City)
25	GK	ESP	Víctor (to (Japan) SC Sagamihara)
26	MF	KOR	Jeon San-hae (released)
29	FW	BRA	Junior Barros (to (Japan) Ventforet Kofu, end of loan)
31	MF	JPN	Kota Miyamoto (to (Japan) Shimizu S-Pulse, end of loan)
33	FW	BRA	Michael (released)
36	DF	JPN	Tabinas Jefferson (to (Japan) Kawasaki Frontale, end of loan)
37	MF	JPN	Mizuki Ichimaru (to (Japan) Gamba Osaka, end of loan)
38	MF	JPN	Koki Tsukagawa (to (Japan) Matsumoto Yamaga, end of loan)
39	MF	JPN	Kenji Baba (to (Japan) Oita Trinita, end of loan)
40	DF	JPN	Tomonobu Yokoyama (retired)
43	GK	GER	Jan-Ole Sievers (to (Germany) FC Kaiserslautern, end of loan)
50	DF	JPN	Takefumi Toma (to (Japan) Matsumoto Yamaga, end of loan)
—	DF	JPN	Tsubasa Aoki (to (Japan) FC Maruyasu Okazaki)
—	MF	JPN	Koya Kazama (to (Japan) FC Ryukyu, previously on loan)
—	FW	JPN	Kento Yabuuchi (to (Japan) Verspah Oita)

=== Fujieda MYFC ===
In: Note: Flags indicate national team as defined under FIFA eligibility rules; some limited exceptions apply. Players may hold more than one non-FIFA nationality.

No.	Pos.	Nation	Player
9	FW	JPN	Tsugutoshi Oishi (from (Japan) SC Sagamihara)
11	MF	JPN	Masahiko Sugita (from (Japan) Sony Sendai FC)
15	MF	JPN	Yuya Himeno (on loan from (Japan) Oita Trinita)
18	MF	JPN	Takuma Edamura (from (Japan) Tochigi SC)
19	DF	JPN	Daisuke Inazumi (from Nippon Sport Science University)
22	DF	JPN	Ryosuke Hisadomi (from (Japan) Tochigi SC)
23	MF	JPN	So Kataoka (from (Japan) FC Imabari, previously on loan)
26	MF	JPN	Akiyuki Yokoyama (from Hokuriku University)
27	FW	JPN	Tsubasa Yoshihira (from (Japan) Oita Trinita, previously on loan)
33	MF	JPN	Shohei Kawakami (from Senshu University)

Out: Note: Flags indicate national team as defined under FIFA eligibility rules; some limited exceptions apply. Players may hold more than one non-FIFA nationality.

No.	Pos.	Nation	Player
3	DF	JPN	Junya Suzuki (to (Japan) Blaublitz Akita)
9	FW	JPN	Kenzo Taniguchi (to (Japan) J.FC Miyazaki)
11	MF	JPN	Kohei Kitagawa (to (Japan) J.FC Miyazaki)
13	MF	JPN	Ryuto Otake (to (Japan) J.FC Miyazaki)
15	MF	JPN	Yuji Yabu (retired)
17	DF	JPN	Shinya Awatari (to (Japan) ReinMeer Aomori)
23	MF	JPN	Sho Naruoka (retired)
24	FW	JPN	Daisuke Ando (to (Germany) TuS Mechtersheim)
26	MF	JPN	Hayato Nishinoue (on loan to (Japan) Verspah Oita)
27	MF	JPN	Daiki Deoka (to (Japan) Suzuka Point Getters)
—	FW	JPN	Keisuke Endo (to (Japan) Vonds Ichihara)

=== Kataller Toyama ===
In: Note: Flags indicate national team as defined under FIFA eligibility rules; some limited exceptions apply. Players may hold more than one non-FIFA nationality.

No.	Pos.	Nation	Player
1	GK	JPN	Hiroki Oka (on loan from (Japan) Ventforet Kofu)
2	DF	JPN	Yuki Matsubara (from (Japan) Nagano Parceiro)
6	MF	JPN	Teppei Usui (from (Japan) V-Varen Nagasaki, previously on loan)
9	FW	JPN	Hayate Take (from (Japan) Fukushima United FC)
14	FW	JPN	Yohei Ono (on loan from (Japan) Kyoto Sanga FC)
16	MF	JPN	Hiroya Sueki (from Hosei University)
18	FW	JPN	Akira Matsuzawa (from Hosei University)
20	FW	JPN	Ten Miyagi (on loan from (Japan) Kawasaki Frontale)
21	GK	JPN	Kanta Tanaka (from Biwako Seikei Sport College)
32	MF	JPN	Hiroki Todaka (from (Japan) Machida Zelvia)
33	MF	JPN	Nobuki Iketaka (on loan from (Japan) Urawa Red Diamonds)
37	FW	JPN	Shu Hiramatsu (from (Japan) Albirex Niigata, previously on loan)
—	DF	JPN	Makoto Rindo (from (Japan) Ehime FC)

Out: Note: Flags indicate national team as defined under FIFA eligibility rules; some limited exceptions apply. Players may hold more than one non-FIFA nationality.

No.	Pos.	Nation	Player
2	MF	JPN	Kosei Wakimoto (to (Japan) Iwate Grulla Morioka)
3	DF	JPN	Kenji Dai (to (Japan) Tegevajaro Miyazaki)
9	FW	JPN	Takuya Kokeguchi (retired)
11	FW	JPN	Ryuji Saito (to (Japan) SC Sagamihara)
14	MF	JPN	Tomoyuki Shiraishi (to (Japan) Thespakusatsu Gunma)
16	DF	JPN	Danto Sugiyama (to (Japan) JEF United Chiba, end of loan)
21	GK	JPN	Gakuji Ota (to (Japan) Kyoto Sanga FC)
24	MF	JPN	Yota Maejima (to (Japan) Yokohama FC, end of loan)
25	MF	JPN	Yuta Ito (retired)
28	DF	JPN	Kenshiro Tanioku (to (Japan) Blaublitz Akita)
29	FW	JPN	Tomohiro Tanaka (to (Japan) Blaublitz Akita, end of loan)
30	MF	JPN	Reo Yasunaga (to (Japan) Yokohama FC, end of loan)
32	MF	JPN	Tatsuki Noda (to (Japan) Vissel Kobe, end of loan)
—	MF	JPN	Mizuki Arai (to (Japan) Tokyo Verdy, previously on loan)
—	FW	JPN	Ryo Takiya (retired)

=== Roasso Kumamoto ===
In: Note: Flags indicate national team as defined under FIFA eligibility rules; some limited exceptions apply. Players may hold more than one non-FIFA nationality.

No.	Pos.	Nation	Player
5	DF	JPN	Masahiro Sugata (from Fukuoka University)
6	MF	JPN	So Kawahara (from Fukuoka University)
9	FW	JPN	Kaito Taniguchi (from (Japan) Iwate Grulla Morioka)
11	FW	JPN	Hayato Asakawa (from (Japan) YSCC Yokohama)
14	MF	JPN	Yuhi Takemoto (from Ritsumeikan University)
17	MF	JPN	Hiroto Ishikawa (on loan from (Japan) Sagan Tosu)
18	FW	JPN	Toshiki Takahashi (from Kokushikan University)
25	MF	JPN	Keisatsu Kojima (promoted from youth ranks)
26	MF	JPN	Kosei Tajiri (promoted from youth ranks)
27	FW	JPN	Kakeru Higuchi (promoted from youth ranks)

Out: Note: Flags indicate national team as defined under FIFA eligibility rules; some limited exceptions apply. Players may hold more than one non-FIFA nationality.

No.	Pos.	Nation	Player
1	GK	JPN	Minoru Hata (to (Japan) Kagoshima United FC)
5	DF	JPN	Ryujiro Ueda (retired)
6	MF	JPN	Takumi Murakami (to (Japan) Ococias Kyoto AC)
7	DF	JPN	Shosuke Katayama (retired)
9	FW	JPN	Kazuki Hara (to (Japan) Ococias Kyoto AC)
11	FW	JPN	Kohei Mishima (to (Japan) SC Sagamihara)
17	FW	JPN	Tsubasa Sano (to (Japan) Nagano Parceiro)
19	MF	JPN	Hayate Hachikubo (to (Japan) Suzuka Unlimited FC)
24	DF	JPN	Yuko Takase (to (Japan) Thespakusatsu Gunma)
25	MF	JPN	Keisuke Tanabe (to (Japan) Kagoshima United FC)
27	MF	JPN	Yuto Nakayama (to (Japan) Thespakusatsu Gunma)

=== Gainare Tottori ===
In: Note: Flags indicate national team as defined under FIFA eligibility rules; some limited exceptions apply. Players may hold more than one non-FIFA nationality.

No.	Pos.	Nation	Player
1	GK	JPN	Kengo Fukudome (from Albirex Niigata Singapore)
2	MF	JPN	Masanobu Komaki (from (Japan) Vanraure Hachinohe)
3	DF	JPN	Takuya Fujiwara (from (Japan) Azul Claro Numazu)
9	FW	BRA	Joanderson (from (Brazil) Gremio)
11	FW	JPN	Yu Okubo (from Kansai University)
13	GK	JPN	Ken Tajiri (from (Japan) Gamba Osaka)
17	FW	JPN	Yuya Taguchi (from Yokkaichi Chuo Kogyo High School)
20	DF	JPN	Kazuya Ando (from Tokyo University of Agriculture)
21	MF	JPN	Taiki Arai (from Sanno Institute of Management)
22	MF	BRA	Ramon (on loan from (Japan) FC Ryukyu)
23	MF	JPN	Hikaru Arai (on loan from (Japan) Shonan Bellmare)
24	DF	JPN	Kei Sakamoto (promoted from youth ranks)
27	MF	JPN	Daisuke Sakai (on loan from (Japan) Oita Trinita)
31	GK	JPN	Koshiro Itohara (from Biwako Seikei Sport College)
34	DF	JPN	Kei Oshiro (on loan from (Japan) Urawa Red Diamonds)

Out: Note: Flags indicate national team as defined under FIFA eligibility rules; some limited exceptions apply. Players may hold more than one non-FIFA nationality.

No.	Pos.	Nation	Player
1	GK	JPN	Takashi Kitano (released)
3	DF	BRA	Adriel (released)
6	DF	JPN	Hayato Ikegaya (to (Japan) YSCC Yokohama)
9	FW	BRA	Yuri (to (Brazil) Coimbra EC, end of loan)
11	FW	BRA	Vitor Gabriel (to (Bahrain) Manama Club)
13	FW	JPN	Masamichi Hayashi (to (Japan) FC Imabari)
16	MF	JPN	Yusuke Hoshino (retired)
20	DF	JPN	Tsubasa Oya (retired)
21	GK	JPN	Ryota Inoue (to (Japan) Matsue City FC)
22	MF	JPN	Jinyu Nasu (to (Japan) Matsue City FC)
27	DF	JPN	Takayuki Fukumura (to (Japan) Tokyo Verdy)
29	GK	JPN	Akinori Ichikawa (to (Japan) Yokohama FC, end of loan)
37	DF	JPN	Yuki Uchiyama (to (Japan) Hokkaido Tokachi Sky Earth)
38	MF	JPN	Keita Takahata (to (Japan) Oita Trinita, end of loan)
39	FW	JPN	Kunitomo Suzuki (to (Japan) Shonan Bellmare, end of loan)
—	GK	JPN	Ayumu Hosoda (to (Japan) Fukuyama City FC)

=== Blaublitz Akita ===
In: Note: Flags indicate national team as defined under FIFA eligibility rules; some limited exceptions apply. Players may hold more than one non-FIFA nationality.

No.	Pos.	Nation	Player
2	DF	JPN	Kenshiro Tanioku (from (Japan) Kataller Toyama)
3	DF	JPN	Junya Suzuki (from (Japan) Fujieda MYFC)
4	DF	JPN	Mizuki Aiba (from Fukuoka University)
6	MF	JPN	Yuji Wakasa (from (Japan) Fukushima United FC)
8	MF	JPN	Taira Shige (from (Japan) Giravanz Kitakyushu)
10	MF	JPN	Yuta Shimozawa (from Hosei University)
14	FW	JPN	Yosuke Mikami (from (Japan) Nagano Parceiro)
16	FW	JPN	Naoki Inoue (from Biwako Seikei Sport College)
21	GK	JPN	Yudai Tanaka (from (Japan) SC Sagamihara)
25	MF	JPN	Keisuke Ono (from (Japan) Blancdieu Hirosaki FC, end of loan)
29	FW	JPN	Keita Saito (from (Japan) Mito HollyHock)
39	DF	JPN	Shoma Kamata (from (Japan) Shimizu S-Pulse)
50	DF	JPN	Kenichi Kaga (from (Japan) Montedio Yamagata)
—	FW	JPN	Tomohiro Tanaka (from (Japan) Kataller Toyama, end of loan)

Out: Note: Flags indicate national team as defined under FIFA eligibility rules; some limited exceptions apply. Players may hold more than one non-FIFA nationality.

No.	Pos.	Nation	Player
2	DF	JPN	Kei Omoto (to (Japan) Ococias Kyoto AC)
3	DF	JPN	Taiki Nakashima (retired)
4	MF	JPN	Taiju Watanabe (released)
6	MF	JPN	Tomofumi Fujiyama (to (Japan) Nagano Parceiro)
8	FW	JPN	Masashi Wada (to (Japan) Yokohama F. Marinos, end of loan)
10	MF	JPN	Hiroyuki Furuta (retired)
14	MF	JPN	Kenta Hori (to (Japan) Yokohama F. Marinos, end of loan)
16	FW	JPN	Takumu Fujinuma (to (Japan) Omiya Ardija, end of loan)
21	GK	JPN	Takuya Matsumoto (to (Japan) FC Gifu)
25	FW	JPN	Daisuke Kitahara (to (Japan) Matsue City FC)
26	MF	JPN	Takuya Kakine (to (Japan) Matsue City FC)
27	FW	JPN	Kiyoshiro Tsuboi (to (Japan) Tokushima Vortis, end of loan)
29	DF	JPN	Ryosuke Tada (to (Japan) SC Sagamihara)
39	MF	JPN	Hiroki Kotani (to (Japan) Iwate Grulla Morioka)
—	FW	JPN	Tomohiro Tanaka (released)

=== Nagano Parceiro ===
In: Note: Flags indicate national team as defined under FIFA eligibility rules; some limited exceptions apply. Players may hold more than one non-FIFA nationality.

No.	Pos.	Nation	Player
2	DF	JPN	Keita Yoshioka (from Niigata University of Health and Welfare)
5	DF	JPN	Kenta Hirose (from (Japan) Albirex Niigata)
8	MF	JPN	Tomofumi Fujiyama (from (Japan) Blaublitz Akita)
9	MF	JPN	Kanta Makino (from Kansai University)
13	FW	JPN	Tsubasa Sano (from (Japan) Roasso Kumamoto)
14	MF	JPN	Naoki Sanda (from (Japan) Vanraure Hachinohe)
17	MF	JPN	Takuma Mizutani (from (Japan) Shimizu S-Pulse)
19	FW	JPN	Yoshiki Oka (from (Japan) Matsumoto Yamaga)
22	FW	JPN	Ibuki Yoshida (from Sanno Institute of Management)
23	DF	JPN	Kaito Omomo (from Waseda University)
24	MF	JPN	Hiroyuki Tsubokawa (from Toyo University)
25	MF	JPN	Ryoji Fujimori (from Rissho University)
28	FW	JPN	Hinata Konichi (promoted from youth ranks)
29	MF	JPN	Kento Kawata (on loan from (Japan) Omiya Ardija)
—	FW	JPN	Kazuaki Saso (on loan from (Japan) Omiya Ardija)

Out: Note: Flags indicate national team as defined under FIFA eligibility rules; some limited exceptions apply. Players may hold more than one non-FIFA nationality.

No.	Pos.	Nation	Player
2	DF	JPN	Yuki Matsubara (to (Japan) Kataller Toyama)
3	DF	JPN	Takahiro Oshima (to (Japan) Tochigi City FC)
4	DF	JPN	Takashi Uchino (to (Japan) MIO Biwako Shiga)
5	DF	JPN	Jurato Ikeda (to (Japan) Ehime FC, end of loan)
8	MF	JPN	Yu Doan (to (Japan) Ococias Kyoto AC)
9	FW	JPN	Tomohiro Tsuda (to (Japan) FC Maruyasu Okazaki)
10	FW	JPN	Yuji Unozawa (retired)
13	DF	JPN	Shinji Yamaguchi (to (Japan) MIO Biwako Shiga)
17	MF	JPN	Tomokazu Myojin (retired)
19	FW	JPN	Yosuke Mikami (to (Japan) Blaublitz Akita)
22	MF	JPN	Ippei Kokuryo (to (Japan) Vanraure Hachinohe)
24	MF	JPN	Jumpei Arai (retired)
25	MF	JPN	Kazuki Arinaga (to (Japan) Iwate Grulla Morioka)
27	FW	JPN	Reo Takeshita (to (Japan) MIO Biwako Shiga)
29	MF	JPN	Riku Yamada (to (Japan) Omiya Ardija, end of loan)
31	DF	JPN	Wakaba Shimoguchi (to (Japan) Fagiano Okayama, end of loan)
32	DF	JPN	Keita Irumagawa (to (Japan) Ventforet Kofu, end of loan)
39	FW	JPN	Keita Saito (to (Japan) Mito HollyHock, end of loan)
—	GK	JPN	Ryu Nugraha (on loan to (Japan) Fukui United FC)
—	DF	JPN	Ryo Nishiguchi (to (Japan) MIO Biwako Shiga, previously on loan)

=== Vanraure Hachinohe ===
In: Note: Flags indicate national team as defined under FIFA eligibility rules; some limited exceptions apply. Players may hold more than one non-FIFA nationality.

No.	Pos.	Nation	Player
1	GK	KOR	Goh Dong-min (on loan from (Japan) Matsumoto Yamaga)
3	DF	JPN	Wataru Ise (from (Japan) Honda Lock SC)
13	MF	JPN	Satoru Maruoka (from Kindai University)
14	MF	JPN	Yuta Murase (from (Japan) Nara Club)
17	MF	JPN	Tsubasa Ando (from (Japan) Honda Lock SC)
19	MF	JPN	Soga Ishigamori (promoted from youth ranks)
30	MF	JPN	Takaya Kuroishi (from (Japan) MIO Biwako Shiga)
32	MF	JPN	Ippei Kokuryo (from (Japan) Nagano Parceiro)
41	FW	JPN	Kim Hong-yeon (from (Japan) Nara Club, end of loan)

Out: Note: Flags indicate national team as defined under FIFA eligibility rules; some limited exceptions apply. Players may hold more than one non-FIFA nationality.

No.	Pos.	Nation	Player
1	GK	JPN	Kenji Yamada (retired)
3	DF	JPN	Ryosuke Narita (to (Japan) Blancdieu Hirosaki FC)
5	MF	JPN	Hiroto Sakai (to (Japan) Ococias Kyoto AC)
11	FW	JPN	Seiya Murakami (released)
14	DF	JPN	Ryuta Kanai (retired)
15	MF	JPN	Keita Hidaka (to (Japan) Tokyo United FC)
16	MF	JPN	Masanobu Komaki (to (Japan) Gainare Tottori)
17	MF	JPN	Yuto Sashinami (to (Japan) Tokyo Musashino City FC)
20	MF	JPN	Naoki Sanda (to (Japan) Nagano Parceiro)
25	MF	JPN	Taisuke Miyazaki (to (Japan) Tokyo City FC)
28	FW	JPN	Kohe Saho (released)

=== Fukushima United FC ===
In: Note: Flags indicate national team as defined under FIFA eligibility rules; some limited exceptions apply. Players may hold more than one non-FIFA nationality.

No.	Pos.	Nation	Player
1	GK	JPN	Akira Fantini (free agent)
14	FW	JPN	Hiroaki Aoyama (from Biwako Seikei Sport College)
18	MF	JPN	Riku Hashimoto (from Hosei University)
20	FW	JPN	Ömer Tokaç (on loan from (Japan) Shonan Bellmare)
21	DF	JPN	Tomoyasu Yoshida (from Sanno Institute of Management)
24	MF	JPN	Hiromu Kamada (from Shohei High School)
25	MF	JPN	Ryosuke Maeda (from Miyazaki Sangyo Keiei University)
29	DF	JPN	Hayato Fukushima (on loan from (Japan) Shonan Bellmare)
50	GK	JPN	Kenta Watanabe (on loan from (Japan) Machida Zelvia)

Out: Note: Flags indicate national team as defined under FIFA eligibility rules; some limited exceptions apply. Players may hold more than one non-FIFA nationality.

No.	Pos.	Nation	Player
9	FW	JPN	Hayate Take (to (Japan) Kataller Toyama)
11	MF	JPN	Kenta Kawanaka (to (Japan) Matsue City FC)
14	MF	JPN	Kota Hoshi (to (Japan) SC Sagamihara)
15	DF	JPN	Keita Ishido (released)
16	GK	JPN	Daiki Hotta (to (Japan) Shonan Bellmare)
18	FW	JPN	Yosuke Komuta (to (Japan) Aries Tokyo FC)
22	DF	JPN	Kota Teramae (retired)
29	MF	JPN	Yuji Wakasa (to (Japan) Blaublitz Akita)
31	DF	JPN	Junya Higashi (to (Japan) Tokyo United FC)
—	GK	JPN	Lee Yun-oh (to (Japan) Vegalta Sendai, end of loan)

=== Azul Claro Numazu ===
In: Note: Flags indicate national team as defined under FIFA eligibility rules; some limited exceptions apply. Players may hold more than one non-FIFA nationality.

No.	Pos.	Nation	Player
3	DF	JPN	Tatsuya Anzai (on loan from (Japan) Tokyo Verdy)
4	DF	JPN	Akira Osako (from Nippon Sport Science University)
6	MF	JPN	Kenshiro Suzuki (from (Japan) Kamatamare Sanuki)
16	FW	JPN	Kota Suzuki (from Senshu University)
21	FW	JPN	Yuma Mori (from Yokkaichi Chuo Kogyo High School)
26	DF	JPN	Seiji Shindo (from (Japan) Veertien Mie)
28	DF	JPN	Koki Inoue (from (Japan) Kyoto Sanga FC)
29	FW	JPN	Yusuke Imamura (from Kanto Gakuin University)
32	GK	JPN	Ryosuke Otomo (on loan from (Japan) Montedio Yamagata)

Out: Note: Flags indicate national team as defined under FIFA eligibility rules; some limited exceptions apply. Players may hold more than one non-FIFA nationality.

No.	Pos.	Nation	Player
3	DF	JPN	Takuya Fujiwara (to (Japan) Gainare Tottori)
6	MF	JPN	Mitsuo Yamada (to (Japan) Matsumoto Yamaga, end of loan)
16	GK	JPN	Ayumi Niekawa (to (Japan) Mito Hollyhock)
17	FW	JPN	Yuma Kawamori (to (Japan) Kagoshima United FC, end of loan)
19	FW	JPN	Hikaru Shimizu (to (Japan) FC Kariya)
21	DF	JPN	Norimasa Atsukawa (retired)
26	FW	JPN	Yoshiki Oka (to (Japan) Matsumoto Yamaga, end of loan)
28	DF	JPN	Takuma Nakajima (released)
36	FW	JPN	Daichi Ishikawa (to (Japan) FC Gifu, end of loan)
—	DF	JPN	Masato Fujiwara (to (Japan) Thespakusatsu Gunma, end of loan)

=== YSCC Yokohama ===
In: Note: Flags indicate national team as defined under FIFA eligibility rules; some limited exceptions apply. Players may hold more than one non-FIFA nationality.

No.	Pos.	Nation	Player
1	GK	JPN	Issei Ouchi (on loan from (Japan) Yokohama FC)
2	DF	JPN	Minoru Hanafusa (from (Japan) FC Ryukyu)
5	DF	JPN	Hayato Ikegaya (from (Japan) Gainare Tottori)
11	MF	JPN	Takuya Miyamoto (from (Japan) Mito Hollyhock)
14	FW	JPN	Taishi Kaneko (from (Chinese Taipei) Taichung Futuro, end of loan)
17	DF	JPN	Yutaro Yoshino (promoted from reserves team)
18	FW	JPN	Shoma Otoizumi (from (Japan) Tokyo 23 FC)
19	MF	JPN	Kanta Wada (promoted from reserves team)
21	MF	JPN	Ryotaro Yamamoto (from (Japan) Yokohama FC)
23	DF	JPN	Yuma Funabashi (from Edogawa University)
28	FW	JPN	Onye Ogochukwu Promise (from Kochi Chuo High School)
31	GK	JPN	Shunkun Tani (from (Chinese Taipei) Taichung Futuro, end of loan)

Out: Note: Flags indicate national team as defined under FIFA eligibility rules; some limited exceptions apply. Players may hold more than one non-FIFA nationality.

No.	Pos.	Nation	Player
1	GK	CHN	Zhao Tianci (released)
4	DF	KOR	Jung Han-cheol (to (Japan) Machida Zelvia, end of loan)
5	DF	JPN	Norimasa Nakanishi (retired)
11	FW	JPN	Kohei Shin (to (Japan) Thespakusatsu Gunma)
15	MF	JPN	Koya Okuda (to (Japan) Mito Hollyhock)
17	MF	JPN	Ryosuke Kawano (to (Japan) Mito Hollyhock)
18	FW	MAW	Jabulani Linje (released)
19	DF	JPN	Keita Yamauchi (to (Chinese Taipei) Taichung Futuro)
20	FW	JPN	Hayato Asakawa (to (Japan) Roasso Kumamoto)
23	MF	JPN	Yudai Tobita (to (Japan) Fukuyama City FC)
30	GK	JPN	Keito Furushima (to (Japan) Tokyo United FC)

=== Kamatamare Sanuki ===
In: Note: Flags indicate national team as defined under FIFA eligibility rules; some limited exceptions apply. Players may hold more than one non-FIFA nationality.

No.	Pos.	Nation	Player
—	GK	JPN	Suguru Asanuma (from (Japan) SC Sagamihara)
—	DF	JPN	Takumi Komatsu (from Ritsumeikan University)
—	DF	JPN	Naoya Matsumoto (from Tokai Gakuen University)
—	DF	JPN	Atsuki Satsukawa (from Kanto Gakuin University)
—	DF	JPN	Taiyo Shimokawa (from (Japan) Cerezo Osaka)
—	DF	JPN	Danto Sugiyama (on loan from (Japan) JEF United Chiba)
—	DF	JPN	Tomoya Takeshita (promoted from youth ranks)
—	MF	JPN	Kazuki Iwamoto (from Kwansei Gakuin University)
—	FW	JPN	Ryoto Kamiya (from Tokai Gakuen University)
—	FW	JPN	Ikki Kawasaki (from Osaka University of Economics)
—	FW	JPN	Mark Ajay Kurita (from Shizuoka Sangyo University)
—	FW	JPN	Noah Kenshin Browne (on loan from (Japan) Yokohama F. Marinos)

Out: Note: Flags indicate national team as defined under FIFA eligibility rules; some limited exceptions apply. Players may hold more than one non-FIFA nationality.

No.	Pos.	Nation	Player
3	DF	KOR	Bae Soo-yong (to (Japan) Gamba Osaka, end of loan)
4	DF	JPN	Kenji Arabori (retired)
5	DF	JPN	Shogo Asada (to (Japan) Kyoto Sanga FC, end of loan)
6	DF	JPN	Takuya Nagasawa (retired)
8	MF	JPN	Yusuke Akahoshi (retired)
9	FW	JPN	Kazuki Ganaha (to (Japan) Fukui United FC)
13	FW	JPN	Tetsuya Kijima (to (Japan) Tokyo 23 FC)
15	DF	JPN	Atsushi Ichimura (retired)
18	MF	JPN	Kenshiro Suzuki (to (Japan) Azul Claro Numazu)
21	FW	JPN	Yuki Fuke (to (Japan) FC Kariya)
22	DF	JPN	Yusuke Takeda (retired)
23	MF	JPN	Hironori Nishi (retired)
24	GK	JPN	Takuya Seguchi (to (Japan) Tokushima Vortis)
26	MF	JPN	Sota Hamaguchi (to (Japan) Kochi United SC)
33	FW	JPN	Ryosuke Kijima (retired)

=== SC Sagamihara ===
In: Note: Flags indicate national team as defined under FIFA eligibility rules; some limited exceptions apply. Players may hold more than one non-FIFA nationality.

No.	Pos.	Nation	Player
1	GK	ESP	Víctor (from (Japan) FC Gifu)
2	DF	JPN	Ryosuke Tada (from (Japan) Blaublitz Akita)
9	FW	BRA	Yuri Mamute (from (Brazil) Figueirense)
13	FW	JPN	Ryuji Saito (from (Japan) Kataller Toyama)
14	DF	JPN	Yu Tamura (on loan from (Japan) Montedio Yamagata)
15	FW	JPN	Kohei Mishima (from (Japan) Roasso Kumamoto)
17	MF	JPN	Kota Hoshi (from (Japan) Fukushima United FC)
18	DF	JPN	Tatsuya Shirai (from Kanagawa University)
19	MF	JPN	Shohei Kiyohara (from (Japan) Zweigen Kanazawa)
20	MF	JPN	Ryo Kubota (from (Japan) Thespakusatsu Gunma)
21	MF	JPN	Kento Ueno (from Tokyo International University)
22	MF	JPN	Ryuga Nakamura (promoted from youth ranks)
24	MF	JPN	Eitaro Matsuda (on loan from (Japan) Yokohama F. Marinos)
27	FW	JPN	Masashi Wada (from (Japan) Yokohama F. Marinos)
28	MF	JPN	Naoki Kanuma (from Senshu University)
33	MF	JPN	Takahide Umebachi (from (Japan) Zweigen Kanazawa)

Out: Note: Flags indicate national team as defined under FIFA eligibility rules; some limited exceptions apply. Players may hold more than one non-FIFA nationality.

No.	Pos.	Nation	Player
1	GK	JPN	Yudai Tanaka (to (Japan) Blaublitz Akita)
2	FW	BRA	Guilherme (to (Japan) Tonan Maebashi)
10	MF	BRA	Geovani (to (Brazil) Santa Cruz)
13	MF	JPN	Naoto Hiraishi (to (Japan) Ococias Kyoto AC)
14	MF	JPN	Chie Edoojon Kawakami (to (Japan) Tokushima Vortis, end of loan)
15	DF	JPN	Ryuhei Niwa (released)
19	MF	JPN	Toshiya Sueyoshi (retired)
20	DF	BRA	Arthur (released)
23	DF	JPN	Seiji Kawakami (to (Japan) Tochigi SC, end of loan)
24	DF	JPN	Takumi Abe (to (Japan) Tochigi City FC)
26	DF	JPN	Ren Kano (to (Japan) Arterivo Wakayama)
27	FW	JPN	Tsugutoshi Oishi (to (Japan) Fujieda MYFC)
28	MF	BRA	Vinicius (released)
30	DF	KOR	Choi Ji-hyeok (released)
31	DF	JPN	So Nakagawa (to (Japan) Kashiwa Reysol, end of loan)
35	DF	JPN	Daiki Morimoto (to (Japan) Matsumoto Yamaga, end of loan)
39	MF	JPN	Daisuke Ito (to (Japan) Criacao Shinjuku)
—	GK	JPN	Suguru Asanuma (to (Japan) Kamatamare Sanuki)
—	FW	JPN	Jonathan Matsuoka (to (Japan) Nagoya Grampus, end of loan)
—	FW	BRA	João Gabriel (to (Japan) Kagoshima United FC)

=== Iwate Grulla Morioka ===
In: Note: Flags indicate national team as defined under FIFA eligibility rules; some limited exceptions apply. Players may hold more than one non-FIFA nationality.

No.	Pos.	Nation	Player
2	DF	JPN	Shogo Shimohata (from (Japan) Kyoto Sanga FC)
3	DF	JPN	Kodai Fujii (from (Japan) Machida Zelvia)
4	DF	JPN	Yusuke Muta (from (Japan) Kyoto Sanga FC)
6	MF	BRA	Lucas Morelatto (from (Portugal) Vilafranquense)
7	MF	BRA	Wanderson (from (Bulgaria) PFC Beroe)
8	MF	JPN	Kosei Wakimoto (from (Japan) Kataller Toyama)
9	FW	JPN	Kazuhito Kishida (on loan from (Japan) Renofa Yamaguchi)
10	FW	JPN	Michael Morais (from (Sweden) Linköping City)
11	FW	BRA	Brenner (on loan from (Brazil) Internacional)
13	FW	JPN	Yuta Sasaki (from (Republic of Ireland) Cabinteely FC)
17	DF	JPN	Taisuke Nakamura (from (Japan) Omiya Ardija)
20	FW	JPN	Masashi Otani (from (Japan) Criacao Shinjuku)
25	MF	JPN	Kazuki Arinaga (from (Japan) Nagano Parceiro)
27	GK	JPN	Tomoyuki Suzuki (from (Japan) Tokyo Verdy)
32	FW	JPN	Yuki Shikama (from Tokyo Gakugei University)
35	DF	JPN	Shun Morishita (from (Japan) Júbilo Iwata)
39	MF	JPN	Hiroki Kotani (from (Japan) Blaublitz Akita)
41	MF	JPN	Kyosuke Goto (on loan from (Japan) Ventforet Kofu)
—	DF	JPN	Kairi Harayama (from Tokyo Gakugei University)

Out: Note: Flags indicate national team as defined under FIFA eligibility rules; some limited exceptions apply. Players may hold more than one non-FIFA nationality.

No.	Pos.	Nation	Player
2	DF	JPN	Takaaki Kinoshita (to (Japan) ReinMeer Aomori)
3	DF	JPN	Tomoya Fukuda (to (Japan) Shinagawa CC Yokohama)
4	DF	JPN	Yu Yonehara (to (Japan) Criacao Shinjuku)
7	DF	JPN	Natsuki Mugikura (to (Japan) Tokyo United FC)
8	MF	JPN	Gaku Sugamoto (to (Japan) Matsue City FC)
9	FW	JPN	Shota Kikuchi (to (Japan) Tokyo United FC)
10	FW	JPN	Kaito Taniguchi (to (Japan) Roasso Kumamoto)
11	FW	JPN	Kento Yabuuchi (to (Japan) FC Gifu, end of loan)
13	FW	JPN	Kazuma Umenai (to (Japan) Tokyo United FC)
17	MF	JPN	Ryuji Hirota (to (Japan) Veertien Mie)
20	MF	JPN	Kazuki Egashira (to (Japan) Oita Trinita, end of loan)
22	GK	JPN	Sunao Kasahara (to (Japan) MIO Biwako Shiga)
23	DF	JPN	Kengo Ota (to (Japan) Veertien Mie)
24	DF	JPN	Tatsuya Suzuki (retired)
—	MF	JPN	Kazuto Kishida (to (Thailand) Chonburi FC)

=== FC Imabari ===
In: Note: Flags indicate national team as defined under FIFA eligibility rules; some limited exceptions apply. Players may hold more than one non-FIFA nationality.

No.	Pos.	Nation	Player
2	DF	KOR	Jung Han-cheol (from (Japan) Machida Zelvia)
11	FW	JPN	Masamichi Hayashi (from (Japan) Gainare Tottori)
16	FW	JPN	Takumi Katai (from (Japan) Kochi United SC, back from loan)
19	MF	JPN	Ryosuke Ochi (from (Japan) FC Ryukyu)
23	GK	KOR	Lee Do-hyung (from Tokai University Fukuoka High School)
24	DF	JPN	Takatora Kondo (from (Japan) Ryutsu Keizai University)
—	DF	JPN	Masahito Onoda (from (Japan) Shonan Bellmare, end of loan)

Out: Note: Flags indicate national team as defined under FIFA eligibility rules; some limited exceptions apply. Players may hold more than one non-FIFA nationality.

No.	Pos.	Nation	Player
2	MF	JPN	Yusuke Kaneko (released)
5	DF	JPN	Kosuke Ota (to (Japan) ReinMeer Aomori)
8	MF	JPN	Misaki Uemura (to (Japan) Cento Cuore Harima)
11	MF	JPN	Masaomi Nakano (to (Japan) Tokyo Verdy, end of loan)
13	FW	JPN	Yoshihiro Uchimura (retired)
23	GK	POL	Maciej Krakowiak (to (Poland) KKS Kalisz)
32	DF	JPN	Naoki Mizutani (released)
39	FW	JPN	Akito Mukai (to (Japan) Vissel Kobe, end of loan)
—	DF	JPN	Masahito Onoda (to (Japan) Montedio Yamagata)
—	MF	JPN	So Kataoka (to (Japan) Fujieda MYFC, previously on loan)
