= 2022 Japan Football League =

Japan Football League for 2022

Japan Football League
- Season: 2022
- Dates: 13 March – 20 November
- Champions: Nara Club
- Promoted: Nara Club; FC Osaka
- Relegated: FC Kagura Shimane (withdrawn)
- Matches: 240
- Goals: 597 (2.49 per match)
- Top goalscorer: Hayato Asakawa (15 goals)
- Biggest home win: Honda Lock 6–0 MIO Biwako Shiga (11 May)
- Biggest away win: Verspah Oita 0–7 Veertien Mie (19 October)
- Highest scoring: Kochi United 3–5 Maruyasu Okazaki (3 July)
- Highest attendance: 16,218 (Criacao Shinjuku vs Suzuka Point Getters; 9 October)
- Lowest attendance: 39 (Honda Lock vs MIO Biwako Shiga; 11 May)
- Average attendance: 1,126
- All statistics correct as of 20 November 2022.

The 2022 Japan Football League (Japanese: 第24回日本フットボールリーグ[第24回 JFL 2022], Hepburn: Dai Nijūsankai Nihon Futtobōru Rīgu [Dai Nijūsankai JFL 2022]) was the ninth season having a fourth-tier status in Japanese football, and the 24th season since the establishment of Japan Football League. The slogan for this season was "Enchant with a different play!" The matches were mostly broadcast/streamed live at Japan Football League's channel. The league's awards, not held since 2020 due to special measures regarding COVID-19, was held on 6 December 2022.

== League structure and organisation ==
Iwaki FC won the league for the first time in their history, after joining the league only two seasons ago. So, they were promoted and joined J3 for the 2022 season. Then, sixteen clubs featured in this season of Japan Football League. FC Kariya were relegated after losing the playoff against Criacao Shinjuku, who were duly promoted to the JFL after qualifying in the top two spots of the 45th Regional Play-off Series. Honda Lock kept their stay at JFL, as despite having finished 16th last season, they won their playoff match against FC Ise-Shima to avoid relegation to the Regional Leagues.

As of November 2022, there were six teams eligible for promotion to the J3 League, as the only way teams from JFL can be promoted to the J3, is by having a license (the same applies for teams being promoted from J3 to J2, and from J2 to J1). Up from none to 2 teams could be promoted from the Japan Football League, or relegated to the Regional Leagues, depending on the circumstances.

The league is played under a round-robin format, with the 16 teams playing home-and-away matches against each other, playing in total 30 matches across the competition, starting from 13 March and ending on 20 November. It features the usual point-earning format, with 3 points for winning, 1 for drawing, and no points for losing.

Regarding the breaks during the match, because of the COVID-19 pandemic, the JFL continued to follow FIFA's recommendation of a maximum of 5 available substitutions, and 3 substitution windows per team in each match (excluding the half-time). The teams are allowed a water break at each half of the matches regardless of the WBGT on the matchday. The decision to have or not to have a water break is up to whose teams are playing the match.

== Participating clubs ==
The teams which possess promotion-enabler licenses are highlighted in green in the following table.

Club name	Home town	Stadium	Capacity	Position	Notes
Criacao Shinjuku	Shinjuku-ku, Tokyo	AGF Field	2,800	Winners of KSL and 45th RPS	100 Year Plan status. J3 license application was declined by J.League.
Honda FC	Hamamatsu, Shizuoka	Honda Miyakoda Soccer Stadium	2,506	JFL (2nd)	
Honda Lock	Miyazaki, Miyazaki	Hinata Athletic Stadium	20,000	JFL (16th)	
Kochi United	Kōchi, Kōchi	Kōchi Haruno Athletic Stadium	25,000	JFL (13th)	100 Year Plan status and J3 license holders.
Maruyasu Okazaki	Okazaki, Aichi	Okazaki Ryūhoku Stadium	5,000	JFL (14th)	
Kagura Shimane	Matsue, Shimane	Matsue Municipal Athletic Stadium	24,000	JFL (5th)	Renamed from "Matsue City FC"
MIO Biwako Shiga	Kusatsu, Shiga	Higashiōmi Nunobiki Green Stadium	5,060	JFL (12th)	100 Year Plan status applicants
Nara Club	All cities/towns in Nara (Note: centering on Nara)	Rohto Field Nara	30,600	JFL (10th)	100 Year Plan status and J3 license holders
FC Osaka	Higashiōsaka, Osaka	Hanazono Rugby Stadium 2nd Ground	1,722	JFL (7th)	100 Year Plan status and J3 license holders; renamed from "F.C. Osaka"
ReinMeer Aomori	Aomori, Aomori	Kakuhiro Group Athletic Stadium	20,809	JFL (9th)	100 Year Plan status and J3 license holders
Sony Sendai	Tagajō, Miyagi	Miyagi Seikyō Megumino Soccer Stadium	10,000	JFL (6th)	
Suzuka Point Getters	Suzuka, Mie	AGF Suzuka Athletic Stadium	1,450	JFL (4th)	Former J3 license holders
FC Tiamo Hirakata	Hirakata, Osaka	Hirakata Municipal Athletic Stadium	2,500	JFL (8th)	
Tokyo Musashino United	Musashino, Tokyo	Musashino Municipal Athletic Stadium	5,188	JFL (15th)	
Veertien Mie	All cities/towns in Mie (Note: centering on Kuwana & Yokkaichi)	Asahi Gas Energy Tōin Stadium	5,142	JFL (11th)	100 Year Plan status and J3 license holders
Verspah Oita	Yufu, Beppu & Ōita, Ōita	Shōwa Denkō Soccer/Rugby Field	4,700	JFL (3rd)	100 Year Plan status and J3 license holders.

1. Their license was previously suspended after multiple rule-breaking occurrences by the team's board, including a match-fixing scandal originating from the 2021 JFL season. In late June 2022, the J.League determined officially the revocation of their 100 Year Plan status, and then, resulting in Suzuka Point Getters being unable to be qualified for the J3 League.

=== Personnel and kits ===
Club	Manager	Captain	Kit manufacturer
Criacao Shinjuku	(Japan) Ichiro Naruyama	Yu Yonehara	(Japan) gym master
Honda FC	(Japan) Hiroyuki Abe	Yuki Kusumoto	(England) Umbro
Honda Lock SC	(Japan) Yosuke Miyaji	Daichi Takahara	(England) Umbro
Kagura Shimane	(Japan) Noriaki Sanenobu	Keishiro Sato	(Japan) soccer junky
Kochi United SC	(Japan) Takafumi Yoshimoto	Tsubasa Yokotake	(Brazil) ATHLETA
Maruyasu Okazaki	(Japan) Hiroyasu Ibata	Eitaro Tsunoi	(Brazil) ATHLETA
MIO Biwako Shiga	(Japan) Hiroshi Otsuki	Ippei Kokuryo	(Japan) JOGARBOLA
Nara Club	(Spain) Julián Marín Bazalo	Yuki Kotani	(Japan) Squadra
FC Osaka	(Japan) Shinya Tsukahara	Shusuke Sakamoto	(Japan) bonera
ReinMeer Aomori	(Japan) Kei Shibata	Nobuhisa Urata	(England) Umbro
Sony Sendai FC	(Japan) Jun Suzuki	Ren Yoshino	(England) Umbro
Suzuka Point Getters	(Japan) Yasutoshi Miura	Koji Hashimoto	(Brazil) ATHLETA
FC Tiamo Hirakata	(Japan) Yoshizumi Ogawa	Shota Inoue	(Japan) JOGARBOLA
Tokyo Musashino United FC	(Japan) Hiroki Yoda	Daichi Kobayashi	(Japan) Yonex
Veertien Mie	(Japan) Yasuhiro Higuchi	Kenshiro Tanioku	(Japan) Lwond
Verspah Oita	(Japan) Takashi Yamahashi	Hirohito Shinohara	(Japan) YASUDA

== Foreign players ==
Club	Player 1	Player 2	Player 3	Player 4	Player 5	Player 6
Criacao Shinjuku	(North Korea) Hwang Song-su					
Honda FC						
Honda Lock						
Kagura Shimane						
Kochi United	(South Korea) Yoo Jong-min	(Australia) Tando Velaphi				
Maruyasu Okazaki						
MIO Biwako Shiga	(South Korea) Cho Hyeong-in					
Nara Club	(Spain) Arnau Riera					
FC Osaka	(Brazil) Efrain Rintaro	(Brazil) Gabriel Pires	(Brazil) Luiz Fernando	(South Korea) Kim Soo-han	(South Korea) Woo Sang-ho	
ReinMeer Aomori	(Brazil) Halef Pitbull					
Sony Sendai						
Suzuka Point Getters	(Brazil) Vinícius Faria	(South Korea) Kim Tae-woo				
TIAMO Hirakata	(Brazil) João Siqueira	(Brazil) Yuri Messias	(Cameroon) Noah Fortune	(Nigeria) Emeka Basil		
Tokyo Musashino United	(South Korea) Ko Kyung-te	(North Korea) Ryang Hyon-ju				
Veertien Mie	(North Korea) Kim Song-sun					
Verspah Oita						

== League table ==
Pos	Team	Pld	W	D	L	GF	GA	GD	Pts	Promotion or qualification
1	**Nara Club** (Note: J.League 100 Year Plan clubs) (C, P)	30	16	11	3	48	25	+23	59	Promotion to 2023 J3 League (Note: Promotion is conditional on holding a valid J3 license (marked in bold in the table), finishing the season in the top 4 of the JFL, and finishing in the top 2 out of the J.League 100 Year Plan clubs. Average home attendance of at least 2,000 is also required.)
2	**FC Osaka** (P)	30	17	8	5	47	34	+13	59	Promotion to 2023 J3 League
3	Honda FC	30	16	8	6	47	23	+24	56	
4	**ReinMeer Aomori**	30	14	9	7	35	23	+12	51	
5	Maruyasu Okazaki	30	14	7	9	48	34	+14	49	
6	Tokyo Musashino United	30	14	6	10	49	33	+16	48	
7	**Veertien Mie**	30	12	9	9	43	29	+14	45	
8	**Verspah Oita**	30	12	7	11	40	44	−4	43	
9	Suzuka Point Getters	30	12	5	13	31	40	−9	41	
10	Honda Lock	30	10	6	14	33	33	0	36	
11	**Kochi United**	30	9	7	14	30	39	−9	34	
12	Kagura Shimane	30	9	7	14	32	42	−10	34	Folded (Note: Withdrew after the end of the season.)
13	Tiamo Hirakata	30	9	5	16	40	50	−10	32	
14	Sony Sendai	30	5	13	12	23	39	−16	28	
15	Criacao Shinjuku	30	6	6	18	30	52	−22	24	
16	MIO Biwako Shiga	30	5	6	19	21	57	−36	21	

Source: JFL Official Website (in Japanese)
Rules for classification: 1) Points; 2) Goal difference; 3) goals scored; 4) Head-to-head Results (a. Points, b. Goal difference, c. Goals scored); 5) Number of wins; 6) Disciplinary points; 7) Play-off (if necessary)
(C) Champions; (P) Promoted
Notes:

Nara Club and FC Osaka have been promoted to J3 League, so there will be no relegation from the 2022 JFL.

== Season statistics ==
=== Top scorers ===
As of 20 November 2022.

Rank	Player	Club	Goals
1	(Japan) Hayato Asakawa	Nara Club	16
2	(Japan) Hiroki Maeda	Verspah Oita	14
2	(Japan) Himan Morimoto	Tiamo Hirakata	14
2	(Japan) Tatsuma Sakai	Maruyasu Okazaki	14
5	(Japan) Kaito Miyake	Suzuka Point Getters	13
5	(Japan) Shota Tamura	Veertien Mie	13

=== Hat-tricks ===
As of 20 November 2022.

Name	For	Against	Result	Date
Tatsuma Sakai^{3}	Maruyasu Okazaki	Suzuka Point Getters	4–2	20 March 2022
Tomoki Hino^{4}	Honda Lock	Kagura Shimane	5–1	3 April 2022
Yuhi Hayashi^{3}	Maruyasu Okazaki	Kochi United	5–3	3 July 2022
Daiki Kawato^{3}	Tokyo Musashino United	Criacao Shinjuku	4–2	31 July 2022
Himan Morimoto^{3}	Tiamo Hirakata	Honda Lock	3–0	20 November 2022

== Awards ==
The awards were announced and presented on 6 December 2022.

=== Team awards ===
Award	Team
Fair Play Award	Honda Lock
Special Prize	Criacao Shinjuku

=== Individual awards ===
Award	Winner	Team
Best Player (MVP)	Hayato Asakawa	Nara Club
Top Scorer (16 goals)	Hayato Asakawa	Nara Club
Rookie of the Year	Ryusei Kusakari	Honda FC
Best Manager Award	Julián Marín Bazalo	Nara Club
Special Award	Kazuyoshi Miura	Suzuka Point Getters
Fighting Spirit Award	Takanori Kanamori	Tokyo Musashino United
Excellent Referee Award	Koki Yasukawa	–

=== Team of the Year ===
Goalkeeper (GK)	Defenders (DF)	Midfielders (MF)	Forwards (FW)
(Spain) Arnau Riera (Nara Club)	(Japan) Hayato Horiuchi (Honda FC) (Japan) Shusuke Sakamoto (FC Osaka) (Japan) Wataru Ise (Nara Club) (Japan) Kazuya Mima (FC Osaka)	(Japan) Yuya Suzuki (Honda FC) (Japan) Rikuto Kubo (FC Osaka) (Japan) Kazuki Matsumoto (Honda FC) (Japan) Ryusei Kusakari (Honda FC)	(Japan) Hayato Asakawa (Nara Club) (Japan) Tatsuma Sakai (Maruyasu Okazaki)

== See also ==
- Japan Football Association (JFA)

League

- Japanese association football league system
- J.League
  - 2022 J1 League (Tier 1)
  - 2022 J2 League (Tier 2)
  - 2022 J3 League (Tier 3)
- 2022 Regional Champions League (JFL promotion/relegation play-offs)
- 2022 Regional Leagues (Tier 5/6)

Cup(s)

- 2022 Fujifilm Super Cup (Super Cup)
- 2022 Emperor's Cup (National Open Cup)
- 2022 J.League YBC Levain Cup (League Cup)
