= Fuke =

The term "Fuke" is Japanese and may refer to:

- Fuke, known as Puhua, in Chinese, the legendary precursor to the eponymous Fuke Zen school of Buddhism in Japan
- Fuke Zen, a distinct and ephemeral sect of Zen Buddhism that once flourished in Japan

== People with the surname ==
- Yuki Fuke (福家 勇輝, born 1991), Japanese footballer
