= Ippei =

- Gender: Male

Origin
- Origin: Japanese
- Meaning: Different meanings depending on the kanji used

Ippei (written: 一平) is a masculine Japanese given name. Notable people with the name include:

- Ippei Kaneko (金子 一平; 1913–1989), Japanese politician
- Ippei Kojima (小島 一平; born 1944), Japanese badminton player
- Ippei Kokuryo (國領 一平; born 1993), Japanese footballer
- Ippei Kuri (九里 一平; 1940–2023), Japanese manga artist and businessman
- Ippei Mizuhara (水原一平; born 1984), Japanese former interpreter for Shohei Ohtani
- Ippei Shimamura (島村 一平; born 1969), Japanese anthropologist
- Ippei Shinozuka (篠塚 一平; born 1995), Russian-Japanese footballer
- Ippei Watanabe (footballer) (渡辺 一平; born 1969), Japanese footballer
- Ippei Watanabe (swimmer) (渡辺 一平; born 1997), Japanese swimmer
