= Kawamori =

Kawamori (written: 川森 or 河森 lit. "river forest") is a Japanese surname. Notable people with the surname include:

- Shōji Kawamori (河森 正治, born 1960), Japanese anime creator, producer and screenwriter
- Yuma Kawamori (川森 有真, born 1993), Japanese footballer
