= Mashiki, Kumamoto =

Mashiki 益城町
- Town
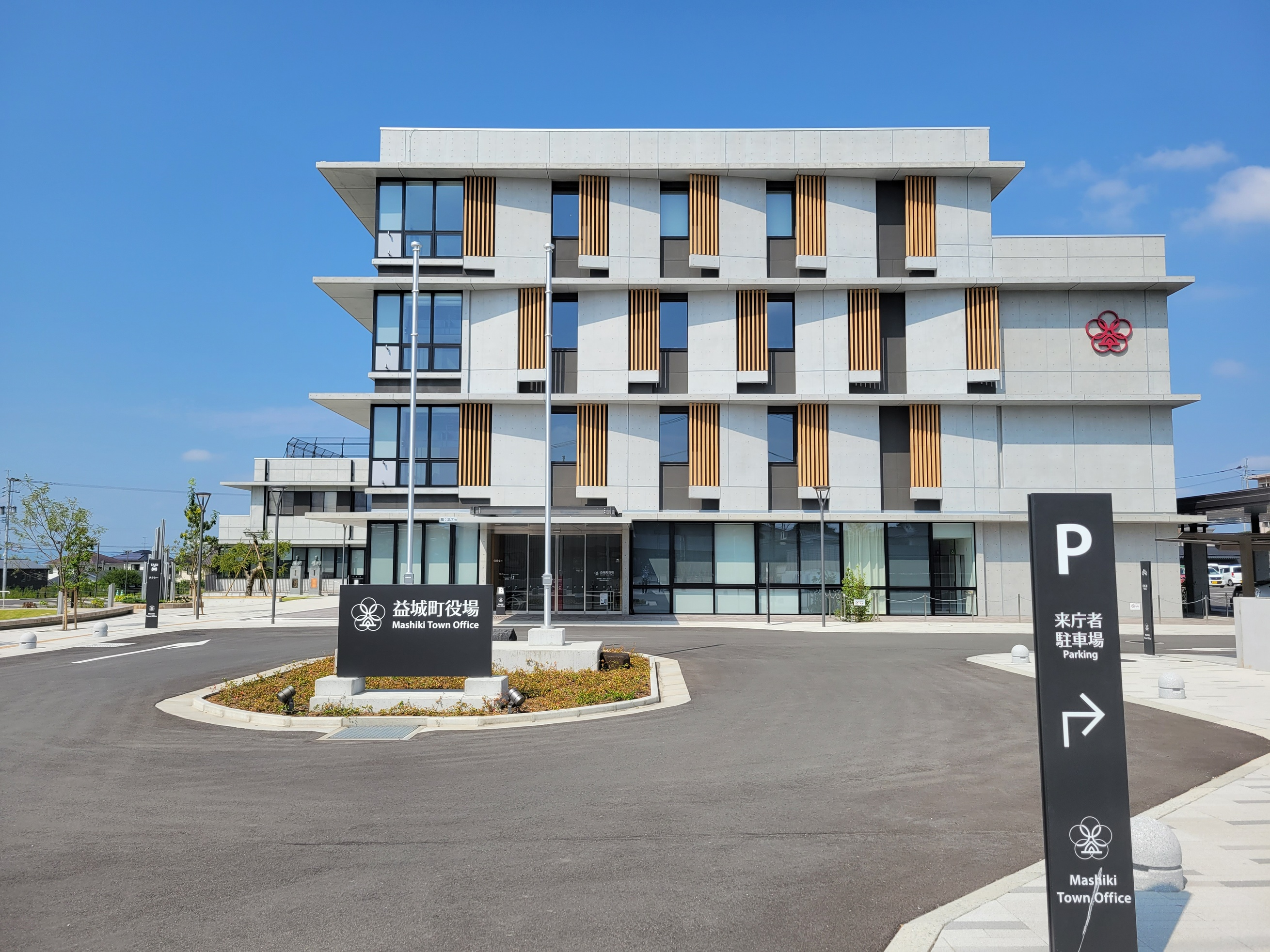
- Mashiki Town Hall in 2023

- Flag Emblem
- Interactive map of Mashiki
- Location in Japan
- Coordinates: 32°47′N 130°48′E
- Country: Japan
- Region: Kyushu
- Prefecture: Kumamoto
- District: Kamimashiki

Government
  - Mayor: Hironori Nishimura

Area
  - Total: 65.68 km^{2} (25.36 sq mi)

Population (August 31, 2024)
  - Total: 34,118
  - Density: 519.5/km^{2} (1,345/sq mi)
- Time zone: UTC+09:00 (JST)
- City hall address: 702 Miyazono, Mashiki-machi, Kamimashiki-gun, Kumamoto-ken 861-2295
- Climate: Cfa
- Website: Official website
- Symbols
- Bird: Japanese Bush Warbler
- Flower: Prunus mume
- Tree: Podocarpaceae

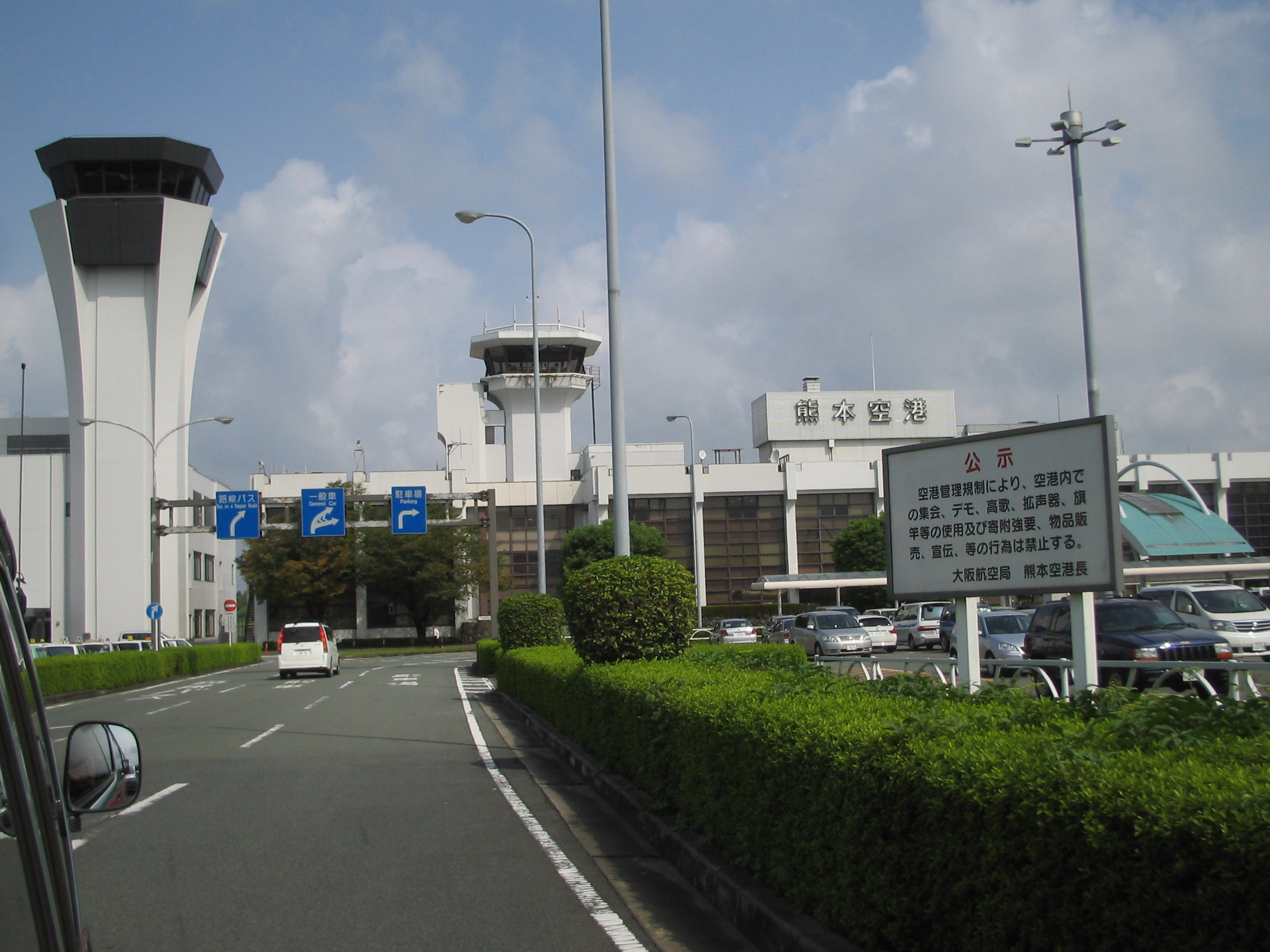
Kumamoto Airport is located in the town.

Mashiki (益城町, Mashiki-machi) is a town located in Kamimashiki District, Kumamoto Prefecture, Japan. As of 31 August 2024, the town had an estimated population of 34,118 in 14,750 households, and a population density of 520 persons per km^{2}. The total area of the town is 65.68 km^{2} (25.36 sq mi). Kumamoto Airport is located in Mashiki.

== Geography ==
Mashiki is adjacent to the eastern part of Kumamoto City and is located slightly north of the center of Kumamoto Prefecture. From the eastern to southern part of the prefecture, there are four peaks in the Kyushu Mountains: Shiroyama (480 meters), Asagoyama (405 meters), Funanoyama (308 meters), and Iidayama (431 meters). The northern part is covered with farmland called the Mashiki Plateau (Takayuhara Plateau). The central part is part of the Kumamoto Plain and is covered with rice paddies. All of the rivers in the town belong to the Midorikawa River system, and flow from east to west.

Mashiki was near the epicenter of the 2016 Kumamoto earthquakes reporting a Shindo 7 (highest possible level) intensity in the primary foreshock on April 14 and the mainshock on April 16, leading to fire and rubble killing at least 40 people. It was hit by another earthquake 10 years later.

=== Neighboring municipalities ===
Kumamoto Prefecture

- Kashima
- Kikuyō
- Kumamoto
- Mifune
- Nishihara
- Ōzu

=== Climate ===
Mashiki has a humid subtropical climate (Köppen Cfa) characterized by warm summers and cool winters with light to no snowfall. The average annual temperature in Mashiki is 15.6 °C. The average annual rainfall is 1965 mm with September as the wettest month. The temperatures are highest on average in August, at around 26.9 °C, and lowest in January, at around 6.3 °C.

Climate data for Mashiki (2003−2020 normals, extremes 2003−present)
Month	Jan	Feb	Mar	Apr	May	Jun	Jul	Aug	Sep	Oct	Nov	Dec	Year
Record high °C (°F)	20.4 (68.7)	24.0 (75.2)	26.6 (79.9)	28.9 (84.0)	32.2 (90.0)	33.9 (93.0)	36.8 (98.2)	38.7 (101.7)	35.4 (95.7)	32.5 (90.5)	28.2 (82.8)	23.0 (73.4)	38.7 (101.7)
Mean daily maximum °C (°F)	9.6 (49.3)	11.9 (53.4)	15.4 (59.7)	20.6 (69.1)	25.2 (77.4)	27.2 (81.0)	30.6 (87.1)	32.2 (90.0)	29.1 (84.4)	24.0 (75.2)	18.0 (64.4)	11.6 (52.9)	21.3 (70.3)
Daily mean °C (°F)	4.5 (40.1)	6.3 (43.3)	9.5 (49.1)	14.5 (58.1)	19.3 (66.7)	22.5 (72.5)	26.1 (79.0)	27.0 (80.6)	23.8 (74.8)	18.3 (64.9)	12.4 (54.3)	6.5 (43.7)	15.9 (60.6)
Mean daily minimum °C (°F)	−0.6 (30.9)	1.0 (33.8)	3.6 (38.5)	8.4 (47.1)	13.7 (56.7)	18.5 (65.3)	22.5 (72.5)	23.0 (73.4)	19.6 (67.3)	13.2 (55.8)	7.3 (45.1)	1.3 (34.3)	11.0 (51.7)
Record low °C (°F)	−9.4 (15.1)	−8.4 (16.9)	−4.8 (23.4)	−1.0 (30.2)	3.7 (38.7)	10.8 (51.4)	16.3 (61.3)	15.9 (60.6)	11.2 (52.2)	4.0 (39.2)	−2.3 (27.9)	−8.0 (17.6)	−9.4 (15.1)
Average precipitation mm (inches)	54.6 (2.15)	106.1 (4.18)	124.8 (4.91)	148.3 (5.84)	186.6 (7.35)	443.7 (17.47)	469.2 (18.47)	195.6 (7.70)	181.8 (7.16)	98.9 (3.89)	84.8 (3.34)	67.4 (2.65)	2,161.8 (85.11)
Average precipitation days (≥ 1.0 mm)	6.1	9.1	10.1	10.0	9.6	15.2	14.2	11.6	10.1	7.2	7.8	7.6	118.6
Source: JMA

=== Demographics ===
Per Japanese census data, the population of Mashiki is as shown below

Historical population
Year	Pop.	±%
1940	16,254	—
1950	21,576	+32.7%
1960	20,000	−7.3%
1970	18,918	−5.4%
1980	24,269	+28.3%
1990	28,492	+17.4%
2000	32,160	+12.9%
2010	32,676	+1.6%
2020	32,510	−0.5%

== History ==
The area of Mashiki was part of ancient Higo Province, During the Edo Period it was part of the holdings of Kumamoto Domain. After the Meiji restoration, the town of Kiyama and the villages of Iino, Hiroysu, Fukuda and Tsumori were established with the creation of the modern municipalities system on April 1, 1889. On April 1, 1954 the town and four villages were merged to form Mashiki Town.

== Government ==
Mashiki has a mayor-council form of government with a directly elected mayor and a unicameral town council of 18 members. Mashiki, collectively with the other municipalities of Kamimashiki District contributes two members to the Kumamoto Prefectural Assembly. In terms of national politics, the town is part of the Kumamoto 3rd district of the lower house of the Diet of Japan.

== Economy ==
Mashiki has an economy dominated by commerce, agriculture and light manufacturing. Due to its proximity to Kumamoto, it is increasingly becoming a commuter town.

== Education ==
Mashiki has five public elementary schools and two public junior high schools operated by the town government. The town does not have a high school.

== Transportation ==
=== Airports ===
- Kumamoto Airport

=== Railways ===
Mashiki does not have any passenger railway service.The nearest station is Shin-Suizenji Station on the JR Kyushu Hohi Main Line.

=== Highways ===
- Kyushu Expressway
- Kyushu Chūō Expressway
- National Route 443

== Notable people from Mashiki ==
- Minoru Hata, football player
- Shuhei Kamimura, football player
- Hiroki Noda, football player
- Ryota Sakata, football player
- Shintaro Shimada, football player
- Masayuki Tani, diplomat, politician
