= Taiga Nishiyama =

Japanese footballer

Taiga Nishiyama 西山 大雅
Personal information
- Full name: Taiga Nishiyama
- Date of birth: August 24, 1999 (age 27)
- Place of birth: Kanagawa, Japan
- Height: 1.80 m (5 ft 11 in)
- Position: Defender

Team information
- Current team: Reilac Shiga FC
- Number: 5

Youth career
- 2015–2017: Yokohama F. Marinos

Senior career*
Years	Team	Apps	(Gls)
2018	Yokohama F. Marinos	0	(0)
2019	→ ReinMeer Aomori (loan)	0	(0)
2022-2024	Yokohama FC	8	(2)
2024	Tochigi City FC	23	(1)
2025-	Reilac Shiga FC	40	(4)
Medal record
Yokohama F. Marinos
Runner-up	J.League Cup	2018
- * Club domestic league appearances and goals as of 23 August 2026

Taiga Nishiyama (西山 大雅, Nishiyama Taiga; born August 24, 1999) is a Japanese football player for Reilac Shiga FC.

== Playing career ==
Nishiyama was born in Kanagawa Prefecture on August 24, 1999. He joined J1 League club Yokohama F. Marinos from youth team in 2018.
