= Ryota Sakata =

Japanese footballer

Ryota Sakata 坂田良太
Personal information
- Full name: Ryota Sakata
- Date of birth: 25 February 1992 (age 34)
- Place of birth: Mashiki, Kumamoto, Japan
- Height: 1.81 m (5 ft 11 in)
- Position: Defender

Youth career
- 2010–2013: National Institute of Fitness and Sports in Kanoya

Senior career*
Years	Team	Apps	(Gls)
2013	Roasso Kumamoto	2	(0)
2014–2019	Tochigi SC	20	(1)
- * Club domestic league appearances and goals as of 10 January 2020

Ryota Sakata (坂田良太, Sakata, Ryota; born 25 February 1992 in Mashiki, Kumamoto) is a Japanese former footballer who last played for Tochigi SC.

== Career ==
Sakata retired at the end of the 2019 season.

== Club statistics ==
Updated to 10 January 2020.

Club performance			League		Cup		Other		Total	
Season	Club	League	Apps	Goals	Apps	Goals	Apps	Goals	Apps	Goals
Japan			League		Emperor's Cup		Other^{1}		Total	
2013	Roasso Kumamoto	J2 League	2	0	–		–		2	0
2014	Tochigi SC	J2 League	0	0	0	0	–		0	0
2015	Tochigi SC	J2 League	10	0	0	0	–		10	0
2016	Tochigi SC	J3 League	8	1	2	0	–		10	1
2017	Tochigi SC	J3 League	1	0	–		–		1	0
2018	Tochigi SC	J2 League	0	0	0	0	–		0	0
2019	Tochigi SC	J2 League	1	0	1	0	–		2	0
Career total			22	1	1	0	2	0	25	1

^{1}Includes J2/J3 Playoffs.
