= Kenya Onodera =

Japanese footballer

Personal information
- Date of birth: 18 November 1997 (age 28)
- Place of birth: Kanagawa, Japan
- Height: 1.84 m (6 ft 0 in)
- Position: Defender

Team information
- Current team: Reilac Shiga FC
- Number: 55

Youth career
- –2009: Hadano Honcho SS
- 2010–2012: Hadano Minami Junior High School
- 2013–2015: Nihon University Fujisawa High School

College career
| Years | Team | Apps | (Gls) |
| 2016–2019 | Meiji University | | |

Senior career*
| Years | Team | Apps | (Gls) |
| 2020–2021 | Montedio Yamagata | 0 | (0) |
| 2021 | → Tochigi SC (loan) | 23 | (1) |
| 2022–2023 | Tochigi SC | 5 | (0) |
| 2022-2023 | → Kagoshima United (loan) | 10 | (2) |
| 2024- | Reilac Shiga FC | 51 | (4) |
- * Club domestic league appearances and goals as of 23 August 2026

Kenya Onodera (小野寺 健也, Onodera Kenya; born 18 November 1997) is a Japanese footballer currently playing as a defender for Reilac Shiga FC.

== Career statistics ==
=== Club ===
As of 27 February 2021.

| Club | Season | League | | | National Cup | | League Cup | | Other | | Total | |
| Club | Season | Division | Apps | Goals | Apps | Goals | Apps | Goals | Apps | Goals | Apps | Goals |
|---|---|---|---|---|---|---|---|---|---|---|---|---|
| Meiji University | 2019 | – | | | 1 (Note: Appearances in the Emperor's Cup) | 0 | – | | 0 | 0 | 1 | 0 |
| Montedio Yamagata | 2020 | J2 League | 0 | 0 | 0 | 0 | 0 | 0 | 0 | 0 | 0 | 0 |
| Montedio Yamagata | 2021 | J2 League | 0 | 0 | 0 | 0 | 0 | 0 | 0 | 0 | 0 | 0 |
| Montedio Yamagata | Total | | 0 | 0 | 0 | 0 | 0 | 0 | 0 | 0 | 0 | 0 |
| Tochigi SC (loan) | 2021 | J2 League | 1 | 0 | 0 | 0 | 0 | 0 | 0 | 0 | 1 | 0 |
| Career total | | | 1 | 0 | 1 | 0 | 0 | 0 | 0 | 0 | 2 | 0 |
