= Takuya Hitomi =

Japanese footballer (born 1997)

Takuya Hitomi 人見 拓哉
Personal information
- Date of birth: 18 December 1997 (age 28)
- Place of birth: Tochigi, Japan
- Height: 1.75 m (5 ft 9 in)
- Position: Forward

Team information
- Current team: Reilac Shiga FC
- Number: 10

Youth career
- Saitama FC
- AS Tochigi bom de bola
- 2013–2015: Yaita Chuo High School

College career
Years	Team	Apps	(Gls)
2016–2019	Rissho University		

Senior career*
Years	Team	Apps	(Gls)
2020–2023	FC Ryukyu	40	(5)
2021	→ Nagano Parceiro (loan)	7	(0)
2024	Atletico Suzuka	27	(14)
2025–	Reilac Shiga FC	48	(13)
- * Club domestic league appearances and goals as of 23 August 2026

Takuya Hitomi (人見 拓哉, Hitomi Takuya; born 18 December 1997) is a Japanese footballer currently playing as a forward for Reilac Shiga FC.

== Career statistics ==
=== Club ===
As of 17 November 2024.

Club	Season	League			National Cup		League Cup		Other		Total	
Club	Season	Division	Apps	Goals	Apps	Goals	Apps	Goals	Apps	Goals	Apps	Goals
FC Ryukyu	2020	J2 League	8	1	0	0	0	0	0	0	8	1
FC Ryukyu	2021	J2 League	0	0	1 (Note: Appearances in the Emperor's Cup)	0	0	0	0	0	1	0
FC Ryukyu	2022	J2 League	23	3	1	0	0	0	0	0	24	3
FC Ryukyu	2023	J3 League	9	1	0	0	0	0	0	0	9	1
AC Nagano Parceiro (loan)	2021	J3 League	7	0	0	0	0	0	0	0	7	0
Atletico Suzuka	2024	Japan Football League	26	14	0	0	0	0	0	0	26	14
Career total			73	19	1	0	0	0	0	0	74	19
