= Keita Ide =

Japanese footballer

Personal information
- Date of birth: 18 August 2001 (age 25)
- Place of birth: Chiba, Japan
- Height: 1.80 m (5 ft 11 in)
- Position: Defender

Team information
- Current team: Reilac Shiga
- Number: 4

Youth career
- –2020: Kashiwa Reysol

Senior career*
Years	Team	Apps	(Gls)
2020–2022	Tochigi SC	3	(0)
2023–	Reilac Shiga	55	(5)

International career
2017	Japan U16	1	(0)
2019	Japan U18	3	(0)
- * Club domestic league appearances and goals as of 23 August 2026

Keita Ide (井出 敬大, Ide Keita; born 18 August 2001) is a Japanese footballer currently playing as a defender for Reilac Shiga.

== Career statistics ==
=== Club ===
As of 29 October 2020.

Club	Season	League			National Cup		League Cup		Other		Total	
Club	Season	Division	Apps	Goals	Apps	Goals	Apps	Goals	Apps	Goals	Apps	Goals
Tochigi SC	2020	J3 League	2	0	0	0	–		0	0	2	0
Career total			2	0	0	0	0	0	0	0	2	0
