= Yuji Hoshi =

Japanese footballer (born 1992)

Yuji Hoshi 星 雄次
Personal information
- Full name: Yuji Hoshi
- Date of birth: 27 July 1992 (age 34)
- Place of birth: Kanagawa, Japan
- Height: 1.76 m (5 ft 9 in)
- Position: Full-back

Team information
- Current team: Albirex Niigata
- Number: 19

Youth career
- Tsukushino SSS
- –2010: Yokohama F. Marinos

College career
Years	Team	Apps	(Gls)
2011–2014	Hosei University		

Senior career*
Years	Team	Apps	(Gls)
2015	Fukushima United FC	35	(5)
2016–2017	Renofa Yamaguchi	59	(7)
2018–2020	Oita Trinita	58	(5)
2021–	Albirex Niigata	100	(3)
- * Club domestic league appearances and goals as of 16 August 2026

Yuji Hoshi (星 雄次, Hoshi Yūji; born 27 July 1992 in Kanagawa) is a Japanese footballer who plays for Albirex Niigata.

== Youth career ==
During Hoshi's second year of high school, as a member of the Yokohama FM Youth team, he won the All-Japan Youth U-18 Championship. During his third year at Hosei University, he was selected for the DENSO Challenge Cup Kanto A team.

== Career ==
On 9 January 2016, Hoshi was announced at Renofa Yamaguchi. He made his league debut against Fagiano Okayama on 28 February 2016. Hoshi scored his first league goal against Tokushima Vortis on 17 April 2016.

On 15 December 2017, Hoshi was announced at Oita Trinita. He made his league debut against Tochigi SC on 25 February 2018. Hoshi scored his first league goal against Mito HollyHock, scoring in the 25th minute. On 8 December 2020, it was announced that his contract would not be renewed for the 2021 season.

On 7 January 2021, Hoshi was announced at Albirex Niigata. He made his league debut against Giravanz Kitakyushu on 27 February 2021. Hoshi scored his first league goal against Renofa Yamaguchi on 13 March 2021, scoring in the 13th minute. On 5 December 2022, his contract was extended for the 2023 season. On 25 December 2023, Hoshi's contract with the club was extended for the 2024 season. On 22 May 2024, it was announced that he had suffered an injury against Blaublitz Akita and would be out for eight weeks.

== Style of play ==
Despite mainly playing as an attacking player, he can also play at left back.

== Personal life ==
He is the twin brother of Kota Hoshi, who currently plays for SC Sagamihara.

== Career statistics ==
Updated to 2 May 2021.

Appearances and goals by club, season and competition
Club	Season	League			Emperor's Cup		J.League Cup		Total	
Club	Season	Division	Apps	Goals	Apps	Goals	Apps	Goals	Apps	Goals
Fukushima United FC	2015	J3 League	35	5	1	0	—		36	5
Renofa Yamaguchi	2016	J2 League	30	4	3	1	—		33	5
Renofa Yamaguchi	2017	J2 League	29	3	1	0	—		30	3
Oita Trinita	2018	J2 League	37	5	0	0	—		37	5
Oita Trinita	2019	J1 League	11	0	4	1	4	0	19	1
Oita Trinita	2020	J1 League	10	0	—		2	0	12	0
Albirex Niigata	2021	J2 League	8	1	0	0	—		8	1
Career total			160	18	9	2	6	0	175	20
