= Hayato Asakawa =

Japanese footballer

Hayato Asakawa 浅川 隼人
Personal information
- Date of birth: 10 May 1995 (age 31)
- Place of birth: Chiba, Japan
- Height: 1.78 m (5 ft 10 in)
- Position: Forward

Team information
- Current team: FC Ryukyu
- Number: 9

Youth career
- Chiba Amical SC
- –2010: JEF United Chiba
- 2011–2013: Yachiyo High School

College career
Years	Team	Apps	(Gls)
2014–2017	Toin University of Yokohama		

Senior career*
Years	Team	Apps	(Gls)
2018–2019	YSCC Yokohama	32	(13)
2020–2021	Roasso Kumamoto	48	(15)
2022–2023	Nara Club	27	(16)
2024–2025	Matsumoto Yamaga FC	44	(14)
2025–	FC Ryukyu	35	(10)
- * Club domestic league appearances and goals as of 25 August 2026

Hayato Asakawa (浅川 隼人, Asakawa Hayato; born 10 May 1995) is a Japanese footballer who plays as a forward for FC Ryukyu.

== Career ==
=== Youth career ===
Asakawa begin youth career in with Chiba Amical SC, he graduated from the academy of JEF United Chiba, went through Yachiyo High School in Chiba Prefecture, and entered Toin University of Yokohama FC.

=== YSCC Yokohama ===
Asakawa joined J3 League club YSCC Yokohama in 2018. Although he did not participate in official matches in the first year, he became a key player in the second year with a change of manager, and finished the season with 13 goals in 32 games.

=== Roasso Kumamoto ===
On 12 December 2019, he completed a transfer to Roasso Kumamoto. In the 2020 season, there were not many appearances in the starting line-up, but he managed to score 11 goals. On 6 December 2021, it was announced that he would leave the club due to the expiration of his contract after two years at Kumamoto.

=== Nara Club ===
On 18 January 2022, it was announced that Asakawa officially transferred to JFL club Nara Club for the 2022 season. On 5 November of the same year, Asakawa led his club to promotion to the J3 League for the first time in their history after defeating Veertien Mie narrowly 1-0. 15 days later, Asakawa led his club to win the 2022 JFL season for the first time in history and was the top scorer with 16 goals in 27 matches. On 6 December, Asakawa won the award as Player of the Year in 2022 as well as named in the Best XI in the JFL Awards. At the end of the season, Asakawa renewed his contract with the club for the 2023 season.

== Career statistics ==
As of the start from 2023 season.

Appearances and goals by club, season and competition
Club	Season	League			National Cup		League Cup		Other		Total	
Club	Season	Division	Apps	Goals	Apps	Goals	Apps	Goals	Apps	Goals	Apps	Goals
YSCC Yokohama	2018	J3 League	0	0	0	0	–		0	0	0	0
YSCC Yokohama	2019	J3 League	32	13	0	0	–		0	0	32	13
YSCC Yokohama	Total		32	13	0	0	0	0	0	0	32	13
Roasso Kumamoto	2020	J3 League	28	11	0	0	–		0	0	28	11
Roasso Kumamoto	2021	J3 League	20	4	2 (Note: Appearances in the Emperor's Cup)	0	–		0	0	22	4
Roasso Kumamoto	Total		48	15	2	0	0	0	0	0	50	15
Nara Club	2022	Japan Football League	27	16	1	0	–		0	0	28	16
Nara Club	2023	J3 League	0	0	0	0	–		0	0	0	0
Nara Club	Total		27	16	1	0	0	0	0	0	28	16
Career total			107	44	3	0	0	0	0	0	111	44

== Honours ==
Roasso Kumamoto

- J3 League : 2021

Nara Club

- Japan Football League : 2022

Individual

- JFL Top scorer : 2022
- JFL Player of the Year : 2022
- JFL Best XI : 2022
- J3 League Best XI: 2023
