= Yuki Matsubara =

Japanese footballer

Yuki Matsubara 松原 優吉
Personal information
- Full name: Yuki Matsubara
- Date of birth: September 5, 1988 (age 38)
- Place of birth: Wakayama, Japan
- Height: 1.85 m (6 ft 1 in)
- Position: Defender

Team information
- Current team: Kataller Toyama
- Number: 2

Youth career
- 2007–2010: Kindai University

Senior career*
| Years | Team | Apps | (Gls) |
| 2011–2012 | Kataller Toyama | 8 | (0) |
| 2013–2019 | Nagano Parceiro | 165 | (11) |
| 2020– | Kataller Toyama | | |
- * Club domestic league appearances and goals as of 23 February 2020

Yuki Matsubara (松原 優吉, Matsubara Yūki; born September 5, 1988) is a Japanese football player.

== Club statistics ==
Updated to 23 February 2020.

| Club performance | | | League | | Cup | | Total | |
| Season | Club | League | Apps | Goals | Apps | Goals | Apps | Goals |
| Japan | | | League | | Emperor's Cup | | Total | |
|---|---|---|---|---|---|---|---|---|
| 2011 | Kataller Toyama | J2 League | 2 | 0 | 0 | 0 | 2 | 0 |
| 2012 | Kataller Toyama | J2 League | 6 | 0 | 0 | 0 | 6 | 0 |
| 2013 | Nagano Parceiro | JFL | 14 | 1 | 4 | 0 | 18 | 1 |
| 2014 | Nagano Parceiro | J3 League | 32 | 3 | 2 | 0 | 34 | 3 |
| 2015 | Nagano Parceiro | J3 League | 32 | 1 | 2 | 1 | 34 | 2 |
| 2016 | Nagano Parceiro | J3 League | 29 | 3 | 3 | 0 | 32 | 3 |
| 2017 | Nagano Parceiro | J3 League | 16 | 0 | 2 | 0 | 18 | 0 |
| 2018 | Nagano Parceiro | J3 League | 27 | 3 | 1 | 0 | 28 | 3 |
| 2019 | Nagano Parceiro | J3 League | 15 | 0 | 2 | 0 | 17 | 0 |
| Total | | | 173 | 11 | 16 | 0 | 189 | 11 |
