= Jabulani Linje =

Malawian footballer

Personal information
- Date of birth: 7 November 1994 (age 32)
- Place of birth: Lilongwe, Malawi
- Height: 1.78 m (5 ft 10 in)
- Position: Forward

Team information
- Current team: Shibuya City
- Number: 31

Youth career
- –2011: Blue Eagles

Senior career*
Years	Team	Apps	(Gls)
2011–2012	Kamuzu Barracks		
2012–2014	Civo United		
2015–2018	Mighty Wanderers		
2018–2019	YSCC Yokohama	3	(0)
2021-	Shibuya City		

International career
2017–	Malawi	5	(0)
- * Club domestic league appearances and goals as of 12:34, 11 August 2021 (UTC)

Jabulani Ali Linje (born 7 November 1994) is a Malawian footballer who played as a forward for J3 League side YSCC Yokohama.

== Career statistics ==
=== Club ===
As of 24 September 2018.

Club	Season	League			Cup		Continental		Other		Total	
Club	Season	Division	Apps	Goals	Apps	Goals	Apps	Goals	Apps	Goals	Apps	Goals
YSCC Yokohama	2018	J3 League	3	0	0	0	–		0	0	3	0
Career total			3	0	0	0	0	0	0	0	3	0

=== International ===
As of matches played 24 September 2018.

National team	Year	Apps	Goals
Malawi	2017	4	0
Malawi	2018	1	0
Total		5	0
