= Yusuke Takeda =

Japanese footballer

Yusuke Takeda 武田 有祐
Personal information
- Full name: Yusuke Takeda
- Date of birth: July 20, 1991 (age 35)
- Place of birth: Shiga, Japan
- Height: 1.78 m (5 ft 10 in)
- Position: Defender

Youth career
- 2010–2013: Ritsumeikan University

Senior career*
| Years | Team | Apps | (Gls) |
| 2014–2019 | Kamatamare Sanuki | 116 | (6) |
- * Club domestic league appearances and goals as of 10 January 2020

Yusuke Takeda (武田 有祐, Takeda Yusuke; born July 20, 1991) is a Japanese former football player who last played for Kamatamare Sanuki.

== Career ==
Takeda retired at the end of the 2019 season.

== Club statistics ==
Updated to 23 February 2020.

| Club performance | | | League | | Cup | | Total | |
| Season | Club | League | Apps | Goals | Apps | Goals | Apps | Goals |
| Japan | | | League | | Emperor's Cup | | Total | |
|---|---|---|---|---|---|---|---|---|
| 2014 | Kamatamare Sanuki | J2 League | 33 | 0 | 0 | 0 | 33 | 0 |
| 2015 | Kamatamare Sanuki | J2 League | 15 | 1 | 2 | 0 | 17 | 1 |
| 2016 | Kamatamare Sanuki | J2 League | 9 | 1 | 0 | 0 | 9 | 1 |
| 2017 | Kamatamare Sanuki | J2 League | 30 | 3 | 1 | 0 | 31 | 3 |
| 2018 | Kamatamare Sanuki | J2 League | 23 | 1 | 0 | 0 | 23 | 1 |
| 2019 | Kamatamare Sanuki | J3 League | 6 | 0 | 2 | 0 | 8 | 0 |
| Career total | | | 116 | 6 | 5 | 0 | 121 | 6 |
