= Kenshiro Suzuki =

Japanese footballer

Kenshiro Suzuki 鈴木 拳士郎
Personal information
- Full name: Kenshiro Suzuki
- Date of birth: March 20, 1996 (age 30)
- Place of birth: Shizuoka, Japan
- Height: 1.77 m (5 ft 10 in)
- Position: Midfielder

Team information
- Current team: Azul Claro Numazu
- Number: 8

Youth career
- Júbilo Iwata

College career
Years	Team	Apps	(Gls)
2014–2017	Kansai University		

Senior career*
Years	Team	Apps	(Gls)
2018–2019	Kamatamare Sanuki	15	(0)
2020–	Azul Claro Numazu	160	(12)
- * Club domestic league appearances and goals as of 1 January 2026

Kenshiro Suzuki (鈴木 拳士郎, Suzuki Kenshirō; born March 20, 1996) is a Japanese football player currently playing for Azul Claro Numazu.

== Career ==
After firstly going through Júbilo Iwata youth ranks and then attending the football team of Kansai University, Suzuki joined Kamatamare Sanuki in December 2017.

== Club statistics ==
Updated to 29 August 2018.

Appearances and goals by club, season and competition
Club	Season	League			Emperor's Cup		Total	
Club	Season	Division	Apps	Goals	Apps	Goals	Apps	Goals
Kamatamare Sanuki	2018	J2 League	6	0	1	0	7	0
Career total			6	0	1	0	7	0
