= Wataru Ise =

Japanese footballer

Wataru Ise 伊勢 渉
Personal information
- Date of birth: 18 July 1996 (age 30)
- Place of birth: Hyōgo, Japan
- Height: 1.84 m (6 ft 0 in)
- Position: Centre-back

Team information
- Current team: Nara Club
- Number: 4

Youth career
- –2008: Higashi Maiko SC
- 2009–2011: Maiko Junior High School
- 2012–2014: St. Michael's High School

College career
Years	Team	Apps	(Gls)
2015–2018	Komazawa University		

Senior career*
Years	Team	Apps	(Gls)
2019	Honda Lock	23	(0)
2020–2021	Vanraure Hachinohe	16	(0)
2022–	Nara Club	35	(0)
- * Club domestic league appearances and goals as of 12 October 2024

Wataru Ise (伊勢 渉, Ise Wataru; born 18 July 1996) is a Japanese footballer who plays as a defender for Nara Club.

== Career statistics ==
=== Club ===
As of 19 March 2023.

Club	Season	League			National Cup		League Cup		Other		Total	
Club	Season	Division	Apps	Goals	Apps	Goals	Apps	Goals	Apps	Goals	Apps	Goals
Honda Lock	2019	JFL	23	0	2 (Note: Appearances in the Emperor's Cup)	0	–		0	0	25	0
Vanraure Hachinohe	2020	J3 League	6	0	0	0	0	0	0	0	6	0
Vanraure Hachinohe	2021	J3 League	10	0	3	0	0	0	0	0	13	0
Nara Club	2022	JFL	27	0	1	0	0	0	0	0	28	0
Nara Club	2023	J3 League	3	0	0	0	0	0	0	0	3	0
Career total			69	0	6	0	0	0	0	0	75	0
