= Víctor Ibáñez =

Spanish footballer (born 1989)

Personal information
- Full name: Víctor Ibáñez Pascual
- Date of birth: 21 April 1989 (age 37)
- Place of birth: Barcelona, Spain
- Height: 1.91 m (6 ft 3 in)
- Position: Goalkeeper

Youth career
- Barcelona
- Espanyol

Senior career*
Years	Team	Apps	(Gls)
2007–2011	Espanyol B	48	(0)
2010–2011	→ Castellón (loan)	0	(0)
2011	→ Eibar (loan)	0	(0)
2011–2012	Lleida Esportiu	37	(0)
2012–2013	Cartagena	29	(0)
2013–2014	Almería B	36	(0)
2014	Alcorcón	0	(0)
2014–2015	Zaragoza B	25	(0)
2015–2017	Hospitalet	15	(0)
2017–2019	Gifu	102	(0)
2020	Sagamihara	34	(0)
2021	Montedio Yamagata	23	(0)
2022–2024	Matsumoto Yamaga	47	(0)
Total		396	(0)
- * Club domestic league appearances and goals

Víctor Ibáñez Pascual (Spanish pronunciation: [ˈbiɣtoɾ iˈβaɲeθ pasˈkwal]; born 21 April 1989) is a Spanish former professional footballer who played as a goalkeeper.

== Club career ==
Born in Barcelona, Catalonia, Ibáñez was a product of RCD Espanyol's youth system. He made his senior debut with the reserves in 2007. Following two unsuccessful loan spells at CD Castellón and SD Eibar, he left the club in 2011 and signed for Lleida Esportiu; all of the sides competed in the Segunda División B.

Ibáñez joined FC Cartagena of the third tier on 4 July 2012. On 9 July 2013, after winning the Ricardo Zamora Trophy in Group IV, he moved to UD Almería B in the same league.

Having been a regular starter, Ibáñez agreed to a two-year deal with Segunda División side AD Alcorcón on 3 July 2014. In September, however, after being deemed surplus to requirements by manager José Bordalás, he terminated his contract and signed for Deportivo Aragón the following month.

On 15 July 2015, Ibáñez joined CE L'Hospitalet on a one-year deal. He moved abroad for the first time on 10 January 2017, signing with J2 League club FC Gifu. He remained in Japan subsequently, with SC Sagamihara, Montedio Yamagata and Matsumoto Yamaga FC.

== Career statistics (Japan only) ==
As of 23 February 2019

Club performance			League		Cup		Total	
Season	Club	League	Apps	Goals	Apps	Goals	Apps	Goals
Japan			League		Emperor's Cup		Total	
2017	Gifu	J2 League	42	0	2	0	44	0
2018	Gifu	J2 League	42	0	1	0	43	0
Total			84	0	3	0	87	0
