= Akira Osako =

Japanese footballer

Akira Osako 大迫 暁
Personal information
- Date of birth: 26 November 1997 (age 28)
- Place of birth: Hyogo, Japan
- Height: 1.74 m (5 ft 9 in)
- Position: Defender

Team information
- Current team: Kataller Toyama
- Number: 30

Youth career
- –2012: Vissel Kobe
- 2013–2015: Riseisha High School

College career
Years	Team	Apps	(Gls)
2016–2019	Nippon Sport Science University		

Senior career*
Years	Team	Apps	(Gls)
2020–2023	Azul Claro Numazu	61	(0)
2024–	Kataller Toyama	11	(0)
- * Club domestic league appearances and goals as of 22:00, 22 September 2024 (UTC)

Akira Osako (大迫 暁, Osako Akira; born 26 November 1997) is a Japanese footballer who plays as a defender for J2 League club Kataller Toyama.

== Career ==
After playing for J3 League club Azul Claro Numazu for four seasons, in December 2023 it was announced that Osaka would be joining Kataller Toyama for the 2024 season.

== Career statistics ==
=== Club ===
As of 22 September 2024

Appearances and goals by club, season and competition
Club	Season	League			National Cup		League Cup		Other		Total	
Club	Season	Division	Apps	Goals	Apps	Goals	Apps	Goals	Apps	Goals	Apps	Goals
Japan			League		Emperor's Cup		J. League Cup		Other		Total	
Azul Claro Numazu	2020	J3 League	13	0	0	0	–		–		13	0
Azul Claro Numazu	2021	J3 League	14	0	0	0	–		–		14	0
Azul Claro Numazu	2022	J3 League	21	0	0	0	–		–		21	0
Azul Claro Numazu	2023	J3 League	12	0	1	0	–		–		13	0
Azul Claro Numazu	Total		60	0	1	0	0	0	0	0	61	0
Kataller Toyama	2024	J3 League	11	0	1	0	2	0	–		14	0
Career total			71	0	2	0	2	0	0	0	75	0
