= Kento Yabuuchi =

Japanese footballer

Kento Yabuuchi 薮内健人
Personal information
- Full name: Kento Yabuuchi
- Date of birth: January 21, 1995 (age 31)
- Place of birth: Sakai, Osaka, Japan
- Height: 1.70 m (5 ft 7 in)
- Position: Right winger

Team information
- Current team: Verspah Oita
- Number: 10

Youth career
- 2010–2012: Gamba Osaka
- 2013–2016: Osaka Sangyo University

Senior career*
Years	Team	Apps	(Gls)
2017–2020	FC Gifu	15	(2)
2019	→ Iwate Grulla Morioka (loan)	23	(1)
2021–	Verspah Oita	44	(8)
- * Club domestic league appearances and goals as of 16:22, 16 January 2022 (UTC)

Kento Yabuuchi (薮内 健人, Yabuuchi Kento; born January 21, 1995) is a Japanese football player. He plays for Verspah Oita.

== Career ==
Kento Yabuuchi joined J2 League club FC Gifu in 2017. In March 2020, Yabuuchi joined Japan Football League club Verspah Oita.
