= Satoru Maruoka =

Japanese footballer

Satoru Maruoka 丸岡 悟
Personal information
- Date of birth: 6 December 1997 (age 28)
- Place of birth: Tokushima, Japan
- Height: 1.71 m (5 ft 7 in)
- Position: Midfielder

Team information
- Current team: ReinMeer Aomori

Youth career
- 2013–2015: Cerezo Osaka U-18
- 2016–2019: Kindai University

Senior career*
Years	Team	Apps	(Gls)
2020–2022	Vanraure Hachinohe	50	(4)
2023–2024	ReinMeer Aomori	0	(0)
2025-	Hokkaido Tokachi Sky Earth	0	(0)
- * Club domestic league appearances and goals as of 11 January 2023, 8:20 (UTC)

Satoru Maruoka (丸岡 悟, Maruoka Satoru; born 6 December 1997) is a Japanese footballer currently playing as a midfielder for Hokkaido Tokachi Sky Earth.

== Career ==
Maruoka is a product of the Cerezo Osaka academy, playing for their under-18 team from 2013 to 2015. After graduating from high school, he entered the Kindai University in 2016, and graduating from it on 2019.

On 25 April 2020, Maruoka began his professional career with Vanraure Hachinohe. On his first year as a professional, Maruoka was trusted to feature for the club in 29 league games, scoring one goal.

However, the number of appearances decreased since the 2021 season, having barely featured with Vanraure during his last two seasons with the club, which he decided to leave at the end of the 2022 season, not renewing his expiring contract.

On 11 January 2023, Maruoka was transferred to JFL club ReinMeer Aomori ahead of the 2023 season.

== Personal life ==
Satoru's brother, Mitsuru played in RANS Nusantara in Liga 1 Indonesia. Satoru's brother once played at Cerezo Osaka as a senior player.

== Career statistics ==
=== Club ===
As of the start from 2023 season.

Club	Season	League			National Cup		League Cup		Other		Total	
Club	Season	Division	Apps	Goals	Apps	Goals	Apps	Goals	Apps	Goals	Apps	Goals
Vanraure Hachinohe	2020	J3 League	29	1	0	0	–		0	0	29	1
Vanraure Hachinohe	2021	J3 League	18	2	2	0	–		0	0	20	2
Vanraure Hachinohe	2022	J3 League	3	1	0	0	–		0	0	3	1
Vanraure Hachinohe	Total		50	4	2	0	–		0	0	52	4
ReinMeer Aomori	2023	Japan Football League	0	0	0	0	–		0	0	0	0
ReinMeer Aomori	Total		0	0	0	0	0	0	0	0	0	0
Career total			50	4	2	0	0	0	0	0	52	4
