= Masahito Onoda =

Japanese footballer (born 1996)

Personal information
- Date of birth: 4 May 1996 (age 30)
- Place of birth: Okayama, Japan
- Height: 1.80 m (5 ft 11 in)
- Position: Defender

Team information
- Current team: Iwate Grulla Morioka
- Number: 36

Youth career
- Yanagigaura High School

Senior career*
Years	Team	Apps	(Gls)
2016–	FC Imabari	0	(0)
2019	→ Shonan Bellmare (loan)	10	(1)
2020	→ Montedio Yamagata (loan)	11	(0)
- * Club domestic league appearances and goals as of 18:38, 21 January 2021 (UTC)

Masahito Onoda (小野田 将人, Onoda Masahito; born 4 May 1996) is a Japanese professional footballer who plays as a defender for FC Imabari.
