= Kota Hoshi =

Japanese footballer

Kota Hoshi 星 広太
Personal information
- Full name: Kota Hoshi
- Date of birth: July 27, 1992 (age 34)
- Place of birth: Yokohama, Japan
- Height: 1.69 m (5 ft 6 1/2 in)
- Position: Midfielder

Team information
- Current team: Giravanz Kitakyushu
- Number: 6

Youth career
- Tsukushino SSS
- –2010: Yokohama F. Marinos

College career
Years	Team	Apps	(Gls)
2011–2014	Kanagawa University		

Senior career*
Years	Team	Apps	(Gls)
2015–2019	Fukushima United FC	88	(13)
2020–2021	SC Sagamihara	57	(3)
2022-2024	Kagoshima United	71	(1)
2025-	Giravanz Kitakyushu	34	(0)
- * Club domestic league appearances and goals as of 24 August 2026

Kota Hoshi (星 広太, Hoshi Kōta; born July 27, 1992) is a Japanese football player, who plays for Giravanz Kitakyushu as a midfielder.

== Career ==
After graduating from Kanagawa University, he was chosen and signed by Fukushima United FC in January 2015.

He is the twin brother of Yuji Hoshi, who currently plays for Albirex Niigata.

== Career statistics ==
Updated to 23 February 2020.

Appearances and goals by club, season and competition
Club	Season	League			Emperor's Cup		Total	
Club	Season	Division	Apps	Goals	Apps	Goals	Apps	Goals
Fukushima United FC	2015	J3 League	28	1	1	0	29	1
Fukushima United FC	2016	J3 League	28	5	2	0	30	5
Fukushima United FC	2017	J3 League	32	7	–		32	7
Fukushima United FC	2018	J3 League	18	2	–		18	2
Fukushima United FC	2019	J3 League	33	4	–		33	4
Career total			139	19	3	0	142	19
