= Kenshiro Tanioku =

Japanese footballer

Kenshiro Tanioku 谷奥 健四郎
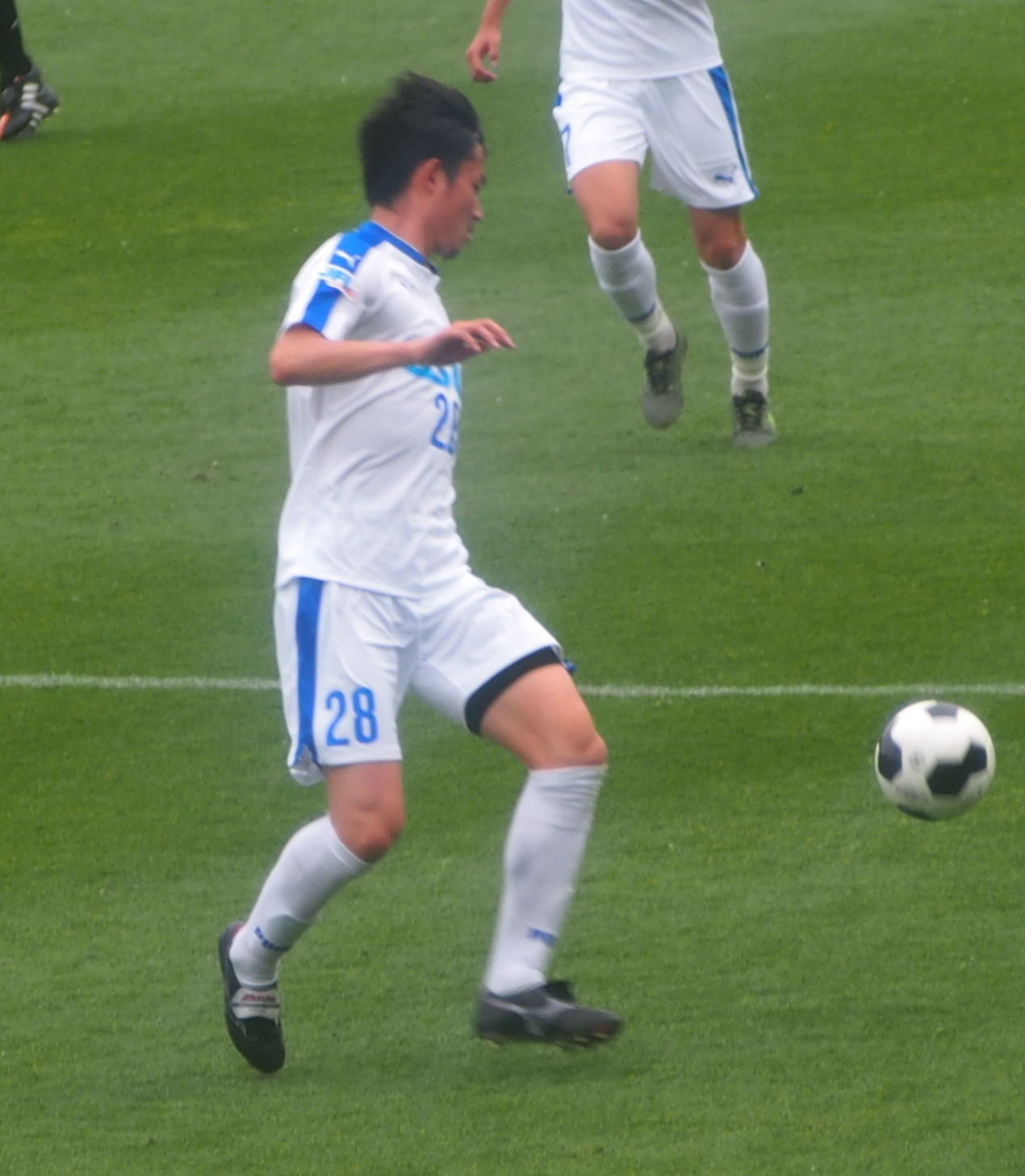

Personal information
- Full name: Kenshiro Tanioku
- Date of birth: May 28, 1992 (age 34)
- Place of birth: Daiō, Mie, Japan
- Height: 1.84 m (6 ft 1/2 in)
- Position: Defender

Team information
- Current team: Veertien Mie
- Number: 2

Youth career
- 2008–2010: Yokkaichi Chuo Kogyo High School

College career
Years	Team	Apps	(Gls)
2011–2014	Juntendo University		

Senior career*
Years	Team	Apps	(Gls)
2015–2017	Matsumoto Yamaga	0	(0)
2016	→ Azul Claro Numazu (loan)	18	(0)
2018–2019	Kataller Toyama	36	(3)
2020-2021	Blaublitz Akita	23	(1)
2022-	Veertien Mie		
- * Club domestic league appearances and goals as of 26 December 2021

Kenshiro Tanioku (谷奥 健四郎, Tanioku Kenshiro; born May 28, 1992) is a Japanese football player. He plays for Veertien Mie.

== Career ==
Kenshiro Tanioku joined J1 League club; Matsumoto Yamaga FC in 2015. April 8, he debuted in J.League Cup (v Ventforet Kofu). In 2016, he moved to Azul Claro Numazu.

== Club statistics ==
Updated to 13 December 2021.

Club performance			League		Cup		League Cup		Total	
Season	Club	League	Apps	Goals	Apps	Goals	Apps	Goals	Apps	Goals
Japan			League		Emperor's Cup		J. League Cup		Total	
2015	Matsumoto Yamaga	J1 League	0	0	0	0	1	0	1	0
2016	Azul Claro Numazu	JFL	18	0	–		–		18	0
2017	Matsumoto Yamaga	J2 League	0	0	3	1	–		3	1
2018	Kataller Toyama	J3 League	21	2	2	0	–		23	2
2019	Kataller Toyama	J3 League	15	1	3	0	–		18	1
2020	Blaublitz Akita	J3 League	3	0	0	0	–		3	0
2021	Blaublitz Akita	J2 League	20	1	1	0	–		21	1
2022	Veertien Mie	JFL	0	0	–		–		0	0
Total			77	4	9	1	1	0	87	5

== Honours ==
Blaublitz Akita

- J3 League (1): 2020
