= Kento Nakamura (footballer) =

Japanese footballer (born 1997)

Personal information
- Date of birth: 1 September 1997 (age 29)
- Place of birth: Saiki, Ōita, Japan
- Height: 1.70 m (5 ft 7 in)
- Position: Midfielder

Team information
- Current team: Reilac Shiga FC
- Number: 8

Youth career
- Tsurumi SSC
- UKI-C.FC
- 2013–2015: Higashi Fukuoka High School

College career
Years	Team	Apps	(Gls)
2016–2019	Meiji University		

Senior career*
Years	Team	Apps	(Gls)
2020–2022	Kagoshima United	12	(1)
2022-2024	Atletico Suzuka Club	85	(3)
2025-	Reilac Shiga FC	53	(3)
Total		150	(7)
- * Club domestic league appearances and goals as of 23 August 2026

Kento Nakamura (中村 健人, Nakamura Kento; born 1 September 1997) is a Japanese footballer currently playing as a midfielder for Reilac Shiga FC.

== Career statistics ==
=== Club ===
As of 5 January 2021.

Club	Season	League			National Cup		League Cup		Other		Total	
Club	Season	Division	Apps	Goals	Apps	Goals	Apps	Goals	Apps	Goals	Apps	Goals
Kagoshima United	2020	J3 League	1	0	0	0	0	0	0	0	1	0
Career total			1	0	0	0	0	0	0	0	1	0
