= Takuya Fujiwara =

Japanese footballer

Personal information
- Full name: Takuya Fujiwara
- Date of birth: December 18, 1992 (age 33)
- Place of birth: Tokushima, Japan
- Height: 1.78 m (5 ft 10 in)
- Position: Defender

Team information
- Current team: YSCC Yokohama
- Number: 3

Youth career
- Fujinoki SC
- –2007: Junior JY
- 2008–2010: Buso High School

College career
Years	Team	Apps	(Gls)
2011–2014	Kanagawa University		

Senior career*
Years	Team	Apps	(Gls)
2015–2020	Azul Claro Numazu	114	(4)
2020–2022	Gainare Tottori	36	(0)
2023–	YSCC Yokohama	57	(2)
Total		207`	(6)
- * Club domestic league appearances and goals as of 20/1/24 @ 13:09(AEST)

Takuya Fujiwara (藤原 拓也, Fujiwara Takuya; born December 18, 1992) is a Japanese football player. He plays for YSCC Yokohama.

== Career ==
Takuya Fujiwara joined Japan Football League club Azul Claro Numazu in 2015.
