= Minoru Hata =

Japanese footballer

Minoru Hata 畑 実
Personal information
- Full name: Minoru Hata
- Date of birth: 30 March 1989 (age 37)
- Place of birth: Mashiki, Kumamoto, Japan
- Height: 1.92 m (6 ft 4 in)
- Position: Goalkeeper

Team information
- Current team: Kagoshima United FC
- Number: 31

Youth career
- 2007–2010: Chuo University

Senior career*
| Years | Team | Apps | (Gls) |
| 2011 | Ain Foods SC | 14 | (0) |
| 2012–2019 | Roasso Kumamoto | 69 | (0) |
| 2020– | Kagoshima United FC | | |
- * Club domestic league appearances and goals as of 23 February 2020

Minoru Hata (畑 実, Hata Minoru; born 30 March 1989) is a Japanese footballer who plays for Kagoshima United FC.

== Club statistics ==
Updated to 23 February 2020.

| Club performance | | | League | | Cup | | Total | |
| Season | Club | League | Apps | Goals | Apps | Goals | Apps | Goals |
| Japan | | | League | | Emperor's Cup | | Total | |
|---|---|---|---|---|---|---|---|---|
| 2011 | Ain Foods SC | JRL (Kansai) | 14 | 0 | – | | 14 | 0 |
| 2012 | Roasso Kumamoto | J2 League | 0 | 0 | 0 | 0 | 0 | 0 |
| 2013 | Roasso Kumamoto | J2 League | 0 | 0 | 2 | 0 | 2 | 0 |
| 2014 | Roasso Kumamoto | J2 League | 32 | 0 | 0 | 0 | 32 | 0 |
| 2015 | Roasso Kumamoto | J2 League | 3 | 0 | 1 | 0 | 4 | 0 |
| 2016 | Roasso Kumamoto | J2 League | 1 | 0 | 0 | 0 | 1 | 0 |
| 2017 | Roasso Kumamoto | J2 League | 22 | 0 | 1 | 0 | 23 | 0 |
| 2018 | Roasso Kumamoto | J2 League | 11 | 0 | 1 | 0 | 12 | 0 |
| 2019 | Roasso Kumamoto | J3 League | 0 | 0 | 1 | 0 | 1 | 0 |
| Career total | | | 83 | 0 | 6 | 0 | 89 | 0 |
