= Shusuke Sakamoto =

Japanese footballer

Shusuke Sakamoto 坂本修佑
Personal information
- Full name: Shusuke Sakamoto
- Date of birth: 22 March 1993 (age 33)
- Place of birth: Tondabayashi, Osaka, Japan
- Height: 1.83 m (6 ft 0 in)
- Positions: Centre-back; striker

Team information
- Current team: FC Osaka
- Number: 5

Youth career
- 2008–2010: Hatsushiba Hashimoto High School

College career
Years	Team	Apps	(Gls)
2011–2014	Osaka University H&SS		

Senior career*
Years	Team	Apps	(Gls)
2015–2017	Nara Club	44	(19)
2018–2020	Azul Claro Numazu	32	(6)
2020	– Nara Club	52	(19)
2020	Azul Claro Numazu	32	(6)
2021–	FC Osaka	71	(8)
Total		231	(58)
- * Club domestic league appearances and goals as of 14/1/24 @ 14:34(AEST)

Shusuke Sakamoto (坂本修佑, Sakamoto Shusuke; born 22 March 1993 in Tondabayashi, Osaka) is a Japanese footballer who plays for FC Osaka.

== Career ==
After attending the Osaka University of Health and Sport Sciences, he joined Nara Club in mid-2015. Before the 2017 season, his manager Norihiro Satsukawa turns Sakamoto from a defender to a centre-forward: as a result, Sakamoto scored 18 goals and he was named the JFL's top-scorer. After this performance, he opted to sign for Azul Claro Numazu.

== Career statistics ==
Updated to 7 February 2021.

Appearances and goals by club, season and competition
Club	Season	League			Emperor's Cup		J.League Cup		Total	
Club	Season	Division	Apps	Goals	Apps	Goals	Apps	Goals	Apps	Goals
Nara Club	2015	JFL	12	1	1	0	–		13	1
Nara Club	2016	JFL	6	0	1	0	–		7	0
Nara Club	2017	JFL	26	18	1	0	–		27	18
Azul Claro Numazu	2018	J3	8	1	0	0	–		8	1
Azul Claro Numazu	2019	J3	19	5	–	–	–		19	5
Azul Claro Numazu	2020	J3	5	0	–	–	–		5	0
Nara Club	2020	JFL	5	0	–	–	–		5	0
FC Osaka	2021	JFL	–	–	–	–	–		–	–
Career total			81	25	3	0	–		84	25
