= Ryosuke Tada =

Japanese footballer (born 1992)

Ryosuke Tada 夛田 凌輔
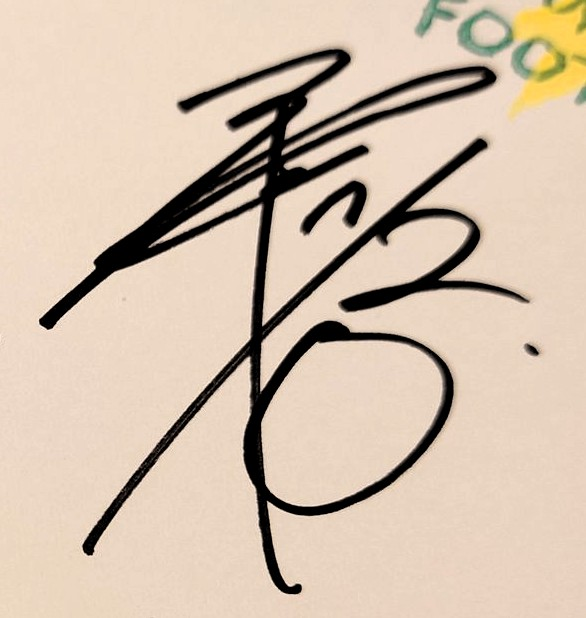
- Autograph in 2022

Personal information
- Full name: Ryosuke Tada
- Date of birth: 7 August 1992 (age 34)
- Place of birth: Izumiōtsu, Japan
- Height: 1.68 m (5 ft 6 in)
- Position: Right back

Team information
- Current team: Giravanz Kitakyushu
- Number: 26

Youth career
- 2008–2010: Cerezo Osaka

Senior career*
Years	Team	Apps	(Gls)
2011–2013	Cerezo Osaka	0	(0)
2012	→ Oita Trinita (loan)	1	(0)
2013	→ Thespakusatsu Gunma (loan)	35	(1)
2014–2015	Thespakusatsu Gunma	29	(1)
2016	Nagano Parceiro	28	(1)
2017–2018	Tochigi SC	58	(0)
2019	Blaublitz Akita	21	(1)
2020–2022	SC Sagamihara	87	(1)
2023–	Giravanz Kitakyushu	18	(2)
- * Club domestic league appearances and goals as of 5 September 2023 (UTC)

Ryosuke Tada (夛田 凌輔, Tada Ryōsuke; born 7 August 1992 in Osaka) is a Japanese football player who plays for Giravanz Kitakyushu.

== National team career ==
In October 2009, Tada was elected Japan U-17 national team for 2009 U-17 World Cup, but he did not play in the match.

== Club statistics ==
Updated to 2 January 2022.

Club	Season	League		Cup^{1}		League Cup^{2}		Total	
Club	Season	Apps	Goals	Apps	Goals	Apps	Goals	Apps	Goals
Cerezo Osaka	2011	0	0	0	0	0	0	0	0
Oita Trinita	2012	1	0	0	0	-		1	0
Thespakusatsu Gunma	2013	35	1	0	0	-		35	1
Thespakusatsu Gunma	2014	16	1	0	0	-		16	1
Thespakusatsu Gunma	2015	13	0	1	0	-		14	0
Nagano Parceiro	2016	28	1	2	1	-		30	2
Tochigi SC	2017	29	0	0	0	-		29	0
Tochigi SC	2018	29	0	0	0	-		29	0
Blaublitz Akita	2019	21	1	1	0	-		22	1
SC Sagamihara	2020	31	1	-		-		31	1
SC Sagamihara	2021	36	0	2	0	-		38	0
SC Sagamihara	2022	0	0	0	0	-		0	0
Career total		241	5	6	1	0	0	247	6

^{1}Includes Emperor's Cup.

^{2}Includes J. League Cup.
