= Kanta Makino =

Japanese footballer

Personal information
- Date of birth: 2 June 1997 (age 29)
- Place of birth: Osaka, Japan
- Height: 1.68 m (5 ft 6 in)
- Position: Midfielder

Team information
- Current team: Nagano Parceiro
- Number: 9

Youth career
- Gamba Osaka
- –2016: Riseisha HS
- 2016–2019: Kansai University

Senior career*
Years	Team	Apps	(Gls)
2020–	Nagano Parceiro	12	(1)
- * Club domestic league appearances and goals as of 17:04, 10 November 2020 (UTC)

Kanta Makino (牧野 寛太, Makino Kanta; born 2 June 1997) is a Japanese footballer currently playing as a midfielder for Nagano Parceiro.

== Career statistics ==
=== Club ===
As of 10 November 2020.

Club	Season	League			National Cup		League Cup		Other		Total	
Club	Season	Division	Apps	Goals	Apps	Goals	Apps	Goals	Apps	Goals	Apps	Goals
Nagano Parceiro	2020	J3 League	12	1	0	0	–		0	0	12	1
Career total			12	1	0	0	0	0	0	0	12	1
