= Kosei Wakimoto =

Japanese footballer

Kosei Wakimoto 脇本晃成
Personal information
- Full name: Kosei Wakimoto
- Date of birth: 8 January 1994 (age 32)
- Place of birth: Hiroshima, Japan
- Height: 1.80 m (5 ft 11 in)
- Position: Defender

Team information
- Current team: Kataller Toyama
- Number: 2

Youth career
- –2005: Midorii Elementary School
- 2006–2011: Sanfrecce Hiroshima

College career
Years	Team	Apps	(Gls)
2012–2015	Tokyo Gakugei University		

Senior career*
Years	Team	Apps	(Gls)
2016–2019	Kataller Toyama	84	(6)
2020–2023	Iwate Grulla Morioka	62	(3)
2023–	Kataller Toyama	7	(0)
- * Club domestic league appearances and goals as of 16 July 2023

Kosei Wakimoto (脇本晃成, Wakimoto Kōsei; born 8 January 1994 in Hiroshima) is a Japanese footballer who plays for Kataller Toyama.

== Career ==
After four seasons for Kataller Toyama, Wakimoto joined Iwate Grulla Morioka in January 2020.

== Club statistics ==
Updated to 23 February 2018.

Appearances and goals by club, season and competition
Club	Season	League			Emperor's Cup		Total	
Club	Season	Division	Apps	Goals	Apps	Goals	Apps	Goals
Kataller Toyama	2016	J3 League	28	1	2	0	30	1
Kataller Toyama	2017	J3 League	23	2	1	0	24	2
Kataller Toyama	2018	J3 League	12	1	0	0	12	1
Kataller Toyama	2019	J3 League	21	2	1	0	22	2
Career total			84	6	4	0	88	6
