= Hayato Ikegaya =

Japanese footballer

Personal information
- Date of birth: 30 March 1992 (age 34)
- Place of birth: Sapporo, Japan
- Height: 1.82 m (6 ft 0 in)
- Position: Midfielder

Team information
- Current team: Toho Titanium
- Number: 44

Youth career
- 2011–2014: Kokushikan University FC

Senior career*
Years	Team	Apps	(Gls)
2015–2016	Mito HollyHock	3	(0)
2016	→ Gainare Tottori (loan)	20	(3)
2017–2019	Gainare Tottori	52	(0)
2020–2021	YSCC Yokohama	43	(1)
2022–2024	AC Nagano Parceiro	104	(4)
2025–	Toho Titanium	0	(0)
- * Club domestic league appearances and goals as of 24 November 2024

Hayato Ikegaya (池ヶ谷 颯斗, Ikegaya, Hayato; born 30 March 1992) is a Japanese footballer who plays for fifth-tier Kantō Soccer League club Toho Titanium.

== Club statistics ==
Updated to 23 February 2017.

Club performance			League		Cup		Total	
Season	Club	League	Apps	Goals	Apps	Goals	Apps	Goals
Japan			League		Emperor's Cup		Total	
2015	Mito HollyHock	J2 League	3	0	2	0	5	0
2016	Gainare Tottori	J3 League	20	3	2	0	22	3
Career total			23	3	4	0	27	3
