= Reilac Shiga FC =

Japanese football club

Reilac Shiga レイラック滋賀
- Full name: Reilac Shiga Football Club
- Founded: 2005; 21 years ago as Sagawa Express Kyoto Soccer Club
- Stadium: Heiwado HATO Stadium (Hikone, Shiga)
- Capacity: 9,000
- Chairman: Yoshitaka Kawahara
- Manager: Makoto Kakuda
- League: J3 League
- 2025: Japan Football League, 2nd of 16 (promoted via play-offs)
- Website: reilac-shiga.co.jp
| Home colours | Away colours |

Reilac Shiga (レイラック滋賀, Reirakku Shiga Efu Shī), formerly MIO Biwako Shiga (MIOびわこ滋賀, Mīo Biwako Shiga), with "Biwako" being a reference to Lake Biwa, is a professional Japanese football club based in Hikone, Shiga Prefecture. They are set to play in J3 League from the 2026–27 season, the third tier of Japanese football after promotion from the Japan Football League in 2025.

== History ==
The club was formed in 2005 from the former Sagawa Express SC Kyoto. They were first called Mi-O Biwako Kusatsu. In 2007, upon promotion to the JFL, they renamed themselves simply MIO Biwako Kusatsu until 2011.

=== Regional League and promotion to JFL (–2007) ===
In 2007, MIO Biwako Kusatsu secured third place in the regional playoffs of the regional playoffs, earning promotion to the JFL for the 2008 season. This marked their first promotion to the Japan Football League at the end of 2007.

=== JFL (2008–2025) ===
MIO Biwako Kusatsu played their first season in 2008 where they finished 14th.

In 2012, they renamed themselves as MIO Biwako Shiga, in order to extend their fanbase to the entire extent of Shiga Prefecture, particularly the area around southern Lake Biwa, in where they mostly have played matches.

In 2022, MIO Biwako Shiga finished in the last place out of the 16 participating teams in the season. The club, however, was not relegated back to the Kansai League, as JFL's top 2 teams were promoted to the J3. Under the league system, MIO Biwako would only be relegated as the last-placed team if no team or only one team had earned promotion to the J3 during the season, which was not the case.

On 27 January 2023, MIO Biwako Shiga announced a name change, becoming Reilac Shiga. On 1 February, the new identity was fully introduced with the crest release.

=== J.League (2026–present) ===
In 2025, they ended in 2nd place, four points behind the champions Honda FC and qualified for the Promotion-Relegation play-offs against the bottom-placed 2025 J3 League, Azul Claro Numazu. On 14 December, Reilac Shiga secure promotion to the J3 League for the first time in their history, after winning 4–3 on aggregate.

== Team image ==
=== Changes in club name ===
- Sagawa Express Kyoto Soccer Club: 2005
- Mi-O Biwako Kusatsu: 2006–2007
- MIO Biwako Kusatsu: 2008–2011
- MIO Biwako Shiga: 2012–2022
- Reilac Shiga: 2023–present

== Players ==
=== Current squad ===
As of 1 August 2026.

Note: Flags indicate national team as defined under FIFA eligibility rules; some limited exceptions apply. Players may hold more than one non-FIFA nationality.

| No. | Pos. | Nation | Player |
|---|---|---|---|
| 1 | GK | JPN | Koki Ito |
| 2 | DF | JPN | Shunsuke Hirai |
| 3 | DF | JPN | Masafumi Miyagi |
| 4 | DF | JPN | Keita Ide |
| 5 | DF | JPN | Taiga Nishiyama |
| 6 | MF | JPN | Takaya Yakushinji |
| 8 | MF | JPN | Kento Nakamura |
| 9 | FW | JPN | Iori Sakamoto (on loan from Iwaki FC) |
| 10 | FW | JPN | Takuya Hitomi |
| 11 | FW | JPN | Kaito Miyake |
| 13 | DF | JPN | Ryuto Koizumi |
| 14 | MF | JPN | Tomoyuki Shiraishi |
| 15 | FW | JPN | Taku Kikushima |
| 16 | MF | JPN | Shota Suzuki |
| 17 | MF | JPN | Raisei Kinoshita |
| 18 | FW | JPN | Shun Akiyama |
| 21 | GK | JPN | Masatoshi Kushibiki |
| 22 | MF | JPN | Kazuki Shoji |
| 23 | MF | JPN | Shuto Tatsuta |

| No. | Pos. | Nation | Player |
|---|---|---|---|
| 24 | MF | JPN | Frank Romero |
| 26 | MF | JPN | Shun Tsunoda |
| 28 | MF | JPN | Yu Tabei |
| 29 | FW | JPN | Tomoki Hino |
| 30 | FW | JPN | Ryuki Yamaguchi (on loan from FC Tiamo Hirakata) |
| 31 | GK | JPN | Sunao Kasahara |
| 32 | MF | JPN | Genta Umiguchi |
| 35 | MF | JPN | Takuto Minami |
| 36 | DF | JPN | Tomoyuki Maekawa |
| 37 | DF | JPN | Atsushi Nabeta (on loan from Kataller Toyama) |
| 41 | GK | JPN | Yuki Motoyoshi |
| 42 | DF | JPN | Rinden Sumida |
| 44 | DF | JPN | So Fujitani |
| 48 | DF | JPN | Soshiro Tanida (on loan from JEF United Chiba) |
| 55 | DF | JPN | Kenya Onodera |
| 66 | MF | JPN | Kaito Matsubara (on loan from FC Tiamo Hirakata) |
| 71 | MF | JPN | Ryohei Watanabe (on loan from Sagan Tosu) |
| 77 | FW | JPN | Shinta Hojo |
| 99 | FW | JPN | Hiryu Okuda |

=== Out on loan ===
Note: Flags indicate national team as defined under FIFA eligibility rules; some limited exceptions apply. Players may hold more than one non-FIFA nationality.

| No. | Pos. | Nation | Player |
|---|---|---|---|
| 7 | MF | JPN | Kazune Kubota (at FC Tiamo Hirakata) |

== Management and staff ==
Club coaching staff

| Role | Name |
|---|---|
| General Director | (Japan) Koji Kurusu |
| Manager | (Japan) Makoto Kakuda |
| Head coach | (Japan) Hiroki Higashi |
| Assistant coach | (Japan) Daichi Okamoto |
| Goalkeeper coach | (Japan) Teru Teramine |
| Assistance Goalkeeper coach | (Japan) Naoto Hirai |
| Competent | (Japan) Yuto Teramoto |
| Deputy Officer | (Japan) Shiorihiro Inoda |

== Managerial history ==
| Manager | Tenure | |
| Manager | Start | Finish |
|---|---|---|
| (Japan) Tetsuya Totsuka | 13 September 2007 | 31 January 2008 |
| (Japan) Naoki Hiraoka | 1 February 2008 | 23 July 2008 |
| (Japan) Hiroki Azuma | 1 October 2008 | 31 January 2009 |
| (Japan) Haruo Wada | 1 February 2009 | 1 October 2011 |
| (Japan) Hiroki Azuma (2) | 1 October 2011 | 1 July 2014 |
| (Japan) Koji Kawashima | 1 July 2014 | 31 January 2015 |
| (Japan) Kōtarō Nakao | 1 January 2015 | 31 December 2015 |
| (Japan) Masafumi Nakaguchi | 1 February 2016 | 31 January 2020 |
| (Japan) Hiroshi Ōtsuki | 1 February 2020 | 27 September 2022 |
| (Japan) Hiroki Azuma | 5 October 2022 | 31 January 2023 |
| (Japan) Akira Teramine | 1 February 2023 | 3 September 2023 |
| (Japan) Toshimi Kikuchi | 4 September 2023 | 15 July 2024 |
| (Japan) Hiroki Higashi | 21 July 2024 | 31 July 2024 |
| (Japan) Makoto Kakuda | 31 July 2024 | 31 January 2026 |
| (Japan) Haruo Wada | 1 February 2026 | 9 June 2026 |
| (Japan) Makoto Kakuda | 9 June 2026 | present |

== Season by season record ==
| Champions | Runners-up | Third place | Promoted | Relegated |

| League | | | | | | | | | | | | | | Emperor's Cup | J.League Cup |
| Season | Division | Tier | Teams | Pos. | P | W | D | L | F | A | GD | Pts | Attendance/G | Emperor's Cup | J.League Cup |
|---|---|---|---|---|---|---|---|---|---|---|---|---|---|---|---|
FC Mi-O Biwako Kusatsu
| 2006 | Kansai Soccer League (Div. 1) | 4 | 8 | 2nd | 14 | 8 | 2 | 4 | 28 | 17 | 11 | 26 | | Did not qualify | Ineligible |
| 2007 | Kansai Soccer League (Div. 1) | 4 | 8 | 2nd | 14 | 10 | 2 | 2 | 48 | 11 | 37 | 34 | | 2nd round | Ineligible |
MIO Biwako Kusatsu
| 2008 | Japan Football League | 3 | 18 | 14th | 34 | 10 | 8 | 16 | 40 | 62 | -22 | 38 | 854 | Did not qualify | Ineligible |
| 2009 | Japan Football League | 3 | 18 | 8th | 34 | 13 | 9 | 12 | 51 | 43 | 8 | 48 | 996 | Did not qualify | Ineligible |
| 2010 | Japan Football League | 3 | 18 | 11th | 34 | 13 | 7 | 14 | 51 | 56 | -5 | 46 | 793 | 2nd round | Ineligible |
| 2011 | Japan Football League | 3 | 18 | 13th | 33 | 11 | 5 | 17 | 43 | 65 | -22 | 38 | 671 | Did not qualify | Ineligible |
MIO Biwako Shiga
| 2012 | Japan Football League | 3 | 17 | 8th | 32 | 11 | 10 | 11 | 53 | 52 | 1 | 43 | 637 | Did not qualify | Ineligible |
| 2013 | Japan Football League | 3 | 18 | 16th | 34 | 8 | 6 | 20 | 40 | 56 | -16 | 30 | 543 | 1st round | Ineligible |
| 2014 | Japan Football League | 4 | 14 | 12th | 26 | 6 | 4 | 16 | 24 | 50 | -26 | 22 | 644 | Did not qualify | Ineligible |
| 2015 | Japan Football League | 4 | 16 | 11th | 30 | 9 | 7 | 14 | 36 | 41 | -5 | 34 | 894 | 2nd round | Ineligible |
| 2016 | Japan Football League | 4 | 16 | 9th | 30 | 11 | 7 | 12 | 38 | 45 | -7 | 40 | 680 | 1st round | Ineligible |
| 2017 | Japan Football League | 4 | 16 | 13th | 30 | 6 | 9 | 15 | 33 | 51 | -18 | 27 | 651 | Did not qualify | Ineligible |
| 2018 | Japan Football League | 4 | 16 | 7th | 30 | 13 | 7 | 10 | 38 | 35 | 3 | 46 | 512 | 2nd round | Ineligible |
| 2019 | Japan Football League | 4 | 16 | 9th | 30 | 11 | 7 | 12 | 27 | 40 | -13 | 40 | 553 | 1st round | Ineligible |
| 2020 † | Japan Football League | 4 | 16 | 9th | 15 | 6 | 2 | 7 | 23 | 27 | -4 | 20 | 309 | 2nd round | Ineligible |
| 2021 † | Japan Football League | 4 | 17 | 12th | 32 | 10 | 7 | 15 | 35 | 48 | -13 | 37 | 483 | Did not qualify | Ineligible |
| 2022 | Japan Football League | 4 | 16 | 16th | 30 | 5 | 6 | 19 | 21 | 57 | -36 | 21 | 517 | 1st round | Ineligible |
Reilac Shiga FC
| 2023 | Japan Football League | 4 | 15 | 3rd | 28 | 11 | 11 | 6 | 47 | 37 | 10 | 44 | 955 | 2nd round | Ineligible |
| 2024 | Japan Football League | 4 | 16 | 4th | 30 | 14 | 6 | 10 | 49 | 45 | 4 | 50 | 2,072 | Did not qualify | Ineligible |
| 2025 | Japan Football League | 4 | 16 | 2nd | 30 | 16 | 8 | 6 | 47 | 35 | 12 | 56 | 2,356 | Did not qualify | Ineligible |
| 2026 | J3 League | 3 | 10 | 8th | 18 | 6 | 1 | 10 | 15 | 28 | -13 | 21 | 2,298 | N/A | |
| 2026–27 | J3 League | 3 | 20 | TBD | 38 | | | | | | | | | TBD | TBD |

Key

- Pos. = Position in league; P = Games played; W = Games won; D = Games drawn; L = Games lost; F = Goals scored; A = Goals conceded; GD = Goals difference; Pts = Points gained
- Attendance/G = Average home league attendance
- † 2020 & 2021 seasons attendances reduced by COVID-19 worldwide pandemic
