= Yuki Fuke =

Japanese footballer

Yuki Fuke 福家 勇輝
Personal information
- Full name: Yuki Fuke
- Date of birth: April 25, 1991 (age 35)
- Place of birth: Sakaide, Kagawa, Japan
- Height: 1.66 m (5 ft 5 1/2 in)
- Position: Forward

Team information
- Current team: FC Kariya
- Number: 30

Youth career
- 2010–2013: Takamatsu University

Senior career*
Years	Team	Apps	(Gls)
2014–2019	Kamatamare Sanuki	38	(3)
2020	FC Kariya		
- * Club domestic league appearances and goals as of 23 February 2020

Yuki Fuke (福家 勇輝, Fuke Yūki; born April 25, 1991) is a Japanese football player for FC Kariya.

== Club statistics ==
Updated to 23 February 2020.

Club performance			League		Cup		Total	
Season	Club	League	Apps	Goals	Apps	Goals	Apps	Goals
Japan			League		Emperor's Cup		Total	
2014	Kamatamare Sanuki	J2 League	9	1	0	0	9	1
2015	Kamatamare Sanuki	J2 League	2	0	1	0	3	0
2016	Kamatamare Sanuki	J2 League	3	0	0	0	3	0
2017	Kamatamare Sanuki	J2 League	0	0	1	0	1	0
2018	Kamatamare Sanuki	J2 League	3	0	0	0	3	0
2019	Kamatamare Sanuki	J3 League	21	2	2	0	23	2
Career total			38	3	4	0	42	3
