= Yuma Kawamori =

Japanese footballer (born 1993)

Yuma Kawamori 川森 有真
Personal information
- Full name: Yuma Kawamori
- Date of birth: 1 February 1993 (age 33)
- Place of birth: Yokkaichi, Mie, Japan
- Height: 1.74 m (5 ft 9 in)
- Position: Forward

Team information
- Current team: Kagoshima United FC
- Number: 30

Youth career
- 2011–2014: Toyo University

Senior career*
Years	Team	Apps	(Gls)
2015–	Kagoshima United FC	56	(10)
2019–	→ Azul Claro Numazu (loan)	4	(0)
- * Club domestic league appearances and goals as of 11:39, 19 May 2019 (UTC)

Yuma Kawamori (川森 有真, Kawamori, Yuma; born 1 February 1993 in Yokkaichi, Mie) is a Japanese footballer who plays for Kagoshima United FC.

== Club statistics ==
Updated to 23 February 2018.

Club performance			League		Cup		Total	
Season	Club	League	Apps	Goals	Apps	Goals	Apps	Goals
Japan			League		Emperor's Cup		Total	
2015	Kagoshima United FC	JFL	8	2	0	0	8	2
2016	Kagoshima United FC	J3 League	12	1	1	0	13	1
2017	Kagoshima United FC	J3 League	17	3	0	0	17	3
Career total			37	6	1	0	38	6
