= Ippei Kokuryo =

Japanese footballer

Ippei Kokuryo 國領 一平
Personal information
- Full name: Ippei Kokuryo
- Date of birth: 31 July 1993 (age 33)
- Place of birth: Higashiōmi, Japan
- Height: 1.77 m (5 ft 10 in)
- Position: Defender

Team information
- Current team: Nagano Parceiro
- Number: 22

Youth career
- 2006–2011: Kyoto Sanga

Senior career*
Years	Team	Apps	(Gls)
2012–2016	Kyoto Sanga	10	(0)
2013–2014	→ SP Kyoto FC (loan)	36	(1)
2015	→ MIO Biwako Shiga (loan)	22	(2)
2017	Nagano Parceiro	16	(1)
- * Club domestic league appearances and goals as of 23 February 2018

Ippei Kokuryo (國領 一平, Kokuryō Ippei; born 31 July 1993 in Higashiōmi) is a Japanese footballer who plays for Nagano Parceiro.

== Club statistics ==
Updated to 23 February 2018.

Club performance			League		Cup		Total	
Season	Club	League	Apps	Goals	Apps	Goals	Apps	Goals
Japan			League		Emperor's Cup		Total	
2012	Kyoto Sanga	J2 League	0	0	0	0	0	0
2013	SP Kyoto FC	JFL	24	1	0	0	24	1
2014	SP Kyoto FC	JFL	12	0	–		12	0
2015	MIO Biwako Shiga	JFL	22	2	2	0	24	2
2016	Kyoto Sanga	J2 League	10	0	1	1	11	1
2017	Nagano Parceiro	J3 League	16	1	3	0	19	1
Career total			84	4	6	1	90	5
