= List of J3 League transfers winter 2016–17 =

This is a list of Japanese football J3 League transfers in the winter transfer window 2016–17 by club.

== Giravanz Kitakyushu ==
In: Note: Flags indicate national team as defined under FIFA eligibility rules; some limited exceptions apply. Players may hold more than one non-FIFA nationality.

No.	Pos.	Nation	Player
1	GK	JPN	Norihiro Yamagishi (on loan from (Japan) Montedio Yamagata)
4	DF	JPN	Shuto Suzuki (on loan from (Japan) Roasso Kumamoto)
7	MF	JPN	Taira Shige (from (Japan) Nara Club)
9	FW	JPN	Shoma Mizunaga (on loan from (Japan) Zweigen Kanazawa)
13	DF	JPN	Itsuki Urata (on loan from (Japan) JEF United Chiba)
14	FW	JPN	Shoki Hirai (from (Japan) Avispa Fukuoka)
15	MF	JPN	Daisuke Kanzaki (from (Japan) V-Varen Nagasaki)
21	GK	JPN	Takuya Takahashi (from (Japan) Yokohama F. Marinos)
22	MF	JPN	Shuto Nakahara (from (Japan) Avispa Fukuoka)
23	MF	JPN	Ryuto Kito (from Mie High School)
24	MF	JPN	Tatsuya Onodera (on loan from (Japan) V-Varen Nagasaki)
28	DF	JPN	Shunsuke Fukuda (from (Japan) Omiya Ardija, previously on loan)

Out: Note: Flags indicate national team as defined under FIFA eligibility rules; some limited exceptions apply. Players may hold more than one non-FIFA nationality.

No.	Pos.	Nation	Player
1	GK	JPN	Nobuyuki Abe (to (Japan) Nagano Parceiro)
3	DF	JPN	Keita Hoshihara (to (Japan) Matsumoto Yamaga)
4	DF	JPN	Keita Ichikawa (to (Japan) Thespakusatsu Gunma)
7	MF	JPN	Koki Kazama (to (Japan) Montedio Yamagata)
9	FW	JPN	Kazuki Hara (to (Japan) Kamatamare Sanuki)
10	MF	JPN	Koki Kotegawa (to (Japan) Oita Trinita)
13	DF	JPN	Takayuki Tada (retired)
15	FW	JPN	Hideo Oshima (retired)
21	GK	JPN	Ayaki Suzuki (to (Japan) Yokohama F. Marinos)
22	FW	BRA	Rodrigo (back to (Japan) V-Varen Nagasaki, previously on loan)
23	DF	JPN	Masahiro Teraoka (to (Japan) Nagano Parceiro)
24	MF	JPN	Jumpei Arai (to (Japan) Nagano Parceiro)

== Tochigi SC ==
In: Note: Flags indicate national team as defined under FIFA eligibility rules; some limited exceptions apply. Players may hold more than one non-FIFA nationality.

No.	Pos.	Nation	Player
3	DF	JPN	Takamasa Taneoka (from Komazawa University)
9	FW	JPN	Koki Takenaka (from (Japan) Briobecca Urayasu)
11	MF	JPN	Kenya Okazaki (from (Japan) Gamba Osaka)
13	FW	JPN	Yosuke Kamigata (from (Japan) V-Varen Nagasaki, previously on loan)
15	GK	JPN	Johnny Leoni (from (Japan) Nagano Parceiro)
16	MF	JPN	Ren Sengoku (from (Japan) Nagano Parceiro)
17	DF	JPN	Shota Fukuoka (from (Japan) Shonan Bellmare)
19	FW	JPN	Kohei Hattori (from (Japan) SC Sagamihara)
21	MF	JPN	Taku Ushinohama (from (Japan) Grulla Morioka)
23	GK	JPN	Shuhei Kawata (from (Japan) Omiya Ardija, previously on loan)
26	DF	JPN	Ryosuke Tada (from (Japan) Nagano Parceiro)
28	MF	JPN	Naoto Ando (from (Japan) Renofa Yamaguchi)
33	DF	JPN	Masashi Nito (from (Japan) AS Casa)
38	MF	JPN	Taisuke Miyazaki (from (Japan) Machida Zelvia, previously on loan)

Out: Note: Flags indicate national team as defined under FIFA eligibility rules; some limited exceptions apply. Players may hold more than one non-FIFA nationality.

No.	Pos.	Nation	Player
3	DF	JPN	Yohei Nishimura (to (Japan) Fujieda MYFC)
9	FW	JPN	Tsugutoshi Oishi (to (Japan) Renofa Yamaguchi)
11	FW	BRA	Jean Moser (back to (Brazil) CA Metropolitano, previously on loan)
15	MF	JPN	Daisuke Saito (to (Japan) Kochi United SC)
16	DF	JPN	Takuma Nagayoshi (retired)
17	DF	JPN	Tatsunori Yamagata (to (Japan) Kataller Toyama)
19	DF	JPN	Hideyuki Akai (retired)
20	MF	JPN	Daiki Yamamoto (to (Japan) Amitie SC Kyoto)
21	GK	JPN	Daisuke Yoshimitsu (to (Japan) Renofa Yamaguchi)
25	DF	JPN	Kyotaro Yamakoshi (released)
29	DF	JPN	Toshio Shimakawa (back to (Japan) Renofa Yamaguchi, previously on loan)
30	MF	JPN	Isao Honma (to (Japan) Albirex Niigata)
32	FW	BRA	Ricardo Lobo (released)
41	MF	JPN	Hayato Sasaki (retired)

== Nagano Parceiro ==
In: Note: Flags indicate national team as defined under FIFA eligibility rules; some limited exceptions apply. Players may hold more than one non-FIFA nationality.

No.	Pos.	Nation	Player
5	DF	JPN	Masahiro Teraoka (from (Japan) Giravanz Kitaykushu)
6	MF	JPN	Shunsuke Iwanuma (from (Japan) Kyoto Sanga)
16	GK	JPN	Nobuyuki Abe (from (Japan) Giravanz Kitaykushu)
19	FW	JPN	Yosuke Mikami (from (Japan) Kataller Toyama)
21	GK	JPN	Dai Takeda (from (Japan) Kagoshima United FC)
22	MF	JPN	Ippei Kokuryo (from (Japan) Kyoto Sanga)
23	MF	JPN	Masaya Nozaki (from (Japan) YSCC)
24	MF	JPN	Jumpei Arai (from (Japan) Giravanz Kitaykushu)
26	DF	JPN	Genichi Endo (from Sanno Institute of Management)
27	DF	JPN	Satoru Oki (on loan from (Japan) Tokyo Verdy)
28	FW	JPN	Hidemasa Kobayashi (from (Japan) Fagiano Okayama)

Out: Note: Flags indicate national team as defined under FIFA eligibility rules; some limited exceptions apply. Players may hold more than one non-FIFA nationality.

No.	Pos.	Nation	Player
5	DF	JPN	Hiroshi Sekita (retired)
6	MF	JPN	Ren Sengoku (to (Japan) Tochigi SC)
14	MF	JPN	Sai Kanakubo (released)
16	GK	JPN	Johnny Leoni (to (Japan) Tochigi SC)
17	FW	BRA	Conrado (back to (Japan) Tombense FC, previously on loan)
19	FW	JPN	Ryota Watanabe (back to (Japan) Ehime FC, previously on loan)
21	GK	KOR	Kim Yeong-gi (retired)
26	DF	JPN	Ryosuke Tada (to (Japan) Tochigi SC)
27	MF	JPN	Hideo Hashimoto (back to (Japan) Cerezo Osaka, previously on loan)
31	GK	JPN	Ryuki Miura (to (Japan) Júbilo Iwata)
32	FW	JPN	Yusuke Kondo (retired)
33	MF	JPN	Kohei Yamada (released)
—	MF	KOR	Park Kun (to (Japan) Thespakusatsu Gunma, previously on loan)
—	MF	KOR	Ko Kyung-te (to (Japan) Briobecca Urayasu, previously on loan)
—	FW	JPN	Masahide Hiraoka (to (Japan) Iwaki FC, previously on loan)

== Blaublitz Akita ==
In: Note: Flags indicate national team as defined under FIFA eligibility rules; some limited exceptions apply. Players may hold more than one non-FIFA nationality.

No.	Pos.	Nation	Player
1	GK	JPN	Akihito Ozawa (from (Japan) Albirex Niigata)
5	DF	JPN	Kaito Chida (from Kanagawa University)
6	DF	JPN	Shingo Arizono (from (Japan) Machida Zelvia)
8	MF	JPN	Tomofumi Fujiyama (from National Institute of Fitness & Sports in Kanoya)
9	DF	JPN	Hiroyuki Furuta (on loan from (Japan) Zweigen Kanazawa)
13	FW	JPN	Ginji Aki (from Ryutsu Keizai University)
15	MF	JPN	Nao Eguchi (from (Japan) Ehime FC)
18	MF	JPN	Keisuke Ono (promoted from youth ranks)
36	MF	JPN	Ryoto Higa (from (Japan) FC Gifu, previously on loan)

Out: Note: Flags indicate national team as defined under FIFA eligibility rules; some limited exceptions apply. Players may hold more than one non-FIFA nationality.

No.	Pos.	Nation	Player
1	GK	JPN	Masataka Nomura (back to (Japan) Nagoya Grampus, previously on loan)
5	DF	JPN	Shuhei Hotta (to (Japan) Ehime FC)
8	MF	JPN	Tatsuya Kumagai (released)
9	FW	JPN	Go Daimu (to (Japan) SC Sagamihara)
13	MF	JPN	Shohei Shinzato (released)
14	MF	JPN	Kazuhiro Kawata (retired)
15	MF	JPN	Yuki Hatanaka (to (Japan) Fujieda MYFC)
18	MF	JPN	Naoki Hatada (retired)
25	MF	JPN	Teruyoshi Ito (to (Japan) Azul Claro Numazu)
32	FW	JPN	Takunosuke Funakawa (on loan to (Japan) Artista Toubu)

== Kagoshima United F.C. ==
In: Note: Flags indicate national team as defined under FIFA eligibility rules; some limited exceptions apply. Players may hold more than one non-FIFA nationality.

No.	Pos.	Nation	Player
2	DF	JPN	Kaito Kimura (from (Japan) Sarcos Fukui)
20	FW	THA	Sittichok Phaso (on loan from (Thailand) Chonburi F.C.)
21	GK	JPN	Kazusa Iwakasi (from Fukuoka University)
24	MF	JPN	Toshihiro Matsushita (from (Japan) Yokohama FC)
25	MF	JPN	Shota Kadono (from Kagoshima United FC Second)
29	MF	JPN	Junya Nodake (from Fukuoka University)
40	DF	JPN	Taikai Uemoto (from (Japan) V-Varen Nagasaki)

Out: Note: Flags indicate national team as defined under FIFA eligibility rules; some limited exceptions apply. Players may hold more than one non-FIFA nationality.

No.	Pos.	Nation	Player
2	DF	JPN	Shun Aso (retired)
10	MF	JPN	Hiroto Yamamoto (retired)
11	MF	JPN	Tsuyoshi Shinchu (retired)
14	MF	JPN	Koji Takano (retired)
21	GK	JPN	Dai Takeda (to (Japan) Nagano Parceiro)
22	FW	JPN	Ryuya Fukushima (to (Japan) Verspah Oita)
24	MF	JPN	Sai Kanakubo (back to (Japan) Nagano Parceiro, previously on loan)
25	MF	JPN	Shohei Yanagizaki (retired)

== Kataller Toyama ==
In: Note: Flags indicate national team as defined under FIFA eligibility rules; some limited exceptions apply. Players may hold more than one non-FIFA nationality.

No.	Pos.	Nation	Player
6	DF	JPN	Tatsunori Yamagata (from (Japan) Tochigi SC)
8	MF	JPN	Ryo Kubota (from (Japan) Tokushima Vortis, previously on loan)
11	FW	BRA	Pablo Augusto Carvalho (from (Brazil) Gremio Osasco Audax)
13	FW	JPN	Ikki Sasaki (from (Japan) Tokushima Vortis)
14	MF	JPN	Yoji Sasaki (on loan from (Japan) Tokushima Vortis)
16	FW	KOR	Han Seung-hyeong (on loan from (Japan) Matsumoto Yamaga)
19	FW	JPN	Daiki Yagishita (from (Japan) Matsumoto Yamaga)
22	MF	JPN	Nobuyuki Shiina (from (Japan) Matsumoto Yamaga, previously on loan)
28	FW	JPN	Kosuke Nishi (promoted from youth ranks)
31	GK	JPN	Kazuki Hattori (from Meiji University)

Out: Note: Flags indicate national team as defined under FIFA eligibility rules; some limited exceptions apply. Players may hold more than one non-FIFA nationality.

No.	Pos.	Nation	Player
11	FW	JPN	Yosuke Mikami (to (Japan) Nagano Parceiro)
13	DF	JPN	Renpei Uchida (to (Japan) Amitie SC Kyoto)
14	MF	JPN	Shunsuke Oyama (retired)
18	DF	JPN	Naoto Yoshii (retired)
19	FW	JPN	Yudai Nishikawa (retired)
20	MF	JPN	Hiroki Nakada (to (Japan) Vanraure Hachinohe)
21	GK	JPN	Koji Ezumi (retired)
28	DF	JPN	Keigo Omi (back to (Japan) FC Gifu, previously on loan)
34	FW	JPN	Koki Oshima (back to (Japan) Kashiwa Reysol, previously on loan)
—	DF	JPN	Hiroki Tanaka (to (Japan) Maruyasu Okazaki, previously on loan)
—	DF	JPN	Takuya Yoshikawa (retired, previously on loan at (Japan) Suzuka Unlimited FC)

== Fujieda MYFC ==
In: Note: Flags indicate national team as defined under FIFA eligibility rules; some limited exceptions apply. Players may hold more than one non-FIFA nationality.

No.	Pos.	Nation	Player
3	DF	JPN	Yohei Nishimura (from (Japan) Tochigi SC)
4	DF	JPN	Ryuji Ito (from (Japan) Tokyo 23 FC)
8	FW	JPN	Keisuke Endo (from (Japan) Machida Zelvia, previously on loan)
9	FW	JPN	Ryota Doi (from (Japan) Grulla Morioka)
11	FW	CAM	Chan Vathanaka (on loan from (Cambodia) Boeung Ket Angkor FC)
15	MF	JPN	Taisuke Mizuno (from (Japan) FC Gifu)
17	MF	JPN	Hirohito Shinohara (from (Japan) Renofa Yamaguchi)
18	MF	JPN	Yuki Hatanaka (from (Japan) Blaublitz Akita)
23	FW	JPN	Masato Sasaki (from (Japan) YSCC)
26	GK	JPN	Junto Taguchi (on loan from (Japan) Yokohama F. Marinos)
28	MF	JPN	Ryuto Otake (from (Japan) Machida Zelvia)
29	DF	JPN	Nobuyuki Kawashima (from (Japan) Thespakusatsu Gunma, previously on loan)

Out: Note: Flags indicate national team as defined under FIFA eligibility rules; some limited exceptions apply. Players may hold more than one non-FIFA nationality.

No.	Pos.	Nation	Player
3	DF	JPN	Hiroki Narabayashi (retired)
4	FW	JPN	Mitsuru Mansho (retired)
8	DF	JPN	Takumi Hashimoto (retired)
11	FW	JPN	Hayato Mine (to (Japan) VONDS Ichihara)
14	MF	JPN	Kenta Nakanishi (released)
17	DF	JPN	Ryuji Mochizuki (retired)
18	MF	JPN	Takuya Mihashi (released)
23	DF	JPN	Yujiro Haraguchi (released)
24	MF	JPN	Hiroki Sasaki (to (Japan) FC Kariya)
26	GK	JPN	Shuhei Yamada (to Albirex Niigata Singapore)
28	FW	JPN	Sho Kagami (back to (Japan) Shimizu S-Pulse, previously on loan)
30	DF	JPN	Koichi Maeda (to (Japan) Nara Club)
32	DF	JPN	Taishin Morikawa (back to (Japan) Roasso Kumamoto, previously on loan)

== F.C. Ryukyu ==
In: Note: Flags indicate national team as defined under FIFA eligibility rules; some limited exceptions apply. Players may hold more than one non-FIFA nationality.

No.	Pos.	Nation	Player
3	DF	JPN	Taishi Nishioka (from Fukuoka University)
5	MF	KOR	Kang Ju-kwang (from (Japan) VONDS Ichihara)
15	MF	JPN	Tatsuya Mochizuki (from Saitama Institute of Technology)
18	FW	JPN	Hiroki Maeda (from Hannan University)
19	MF	KOR	Choe Byeong-gil (from (South Korea) Konkuk University)
20	FW	JPN	Aio Fukuda (from Saitama Institute of Technology)
24	DF	KOR	Kim Hyun-beom (from Yanagigaura High School)
25	DF	JPN	Yu Tamagawa (from (Japan) Esperanza SC)
26	DF	JPN	Mikihito Arai (from Hannan University)

Out: Note: Flags indicate national team as defined under FIFA eligibility rules; some limited exceptions apply. Players may hold more than one non-FIFA nationality.

No.	Pos.	Nation	Player
3	DF	JPN	Kota Miyagi (retired)
5	MF	BRA	Ruan (released)
7	MF	JPN	Keita Tanaka (to (Japan) Mito HollyHock)
9	FW	BRA	Pablo (back to (Brazil) Gremio Osasco Audax, previously on loan)
15	FW	BRA	Leonardo (back to (Brazil) Vitoria, previously on loan)
23	DF	JPN	Yukiya Tamashiro (released)
24	DF	JPN	Kenichiro Hirata (released)
25	MF	JPN	Kyoga Nakamura (back to (Japan) JEF United Chiba, previously on loan)
26	DF	JPN	Itsuki Urata (back to (Japan) JEF United Chiba, previously on loan)

== S.C. Sagamihara ==
In: Note: Flags indicate national team as defined under FIFA eligibility rules; some limited exceptions apply. Players may hold more than one non-FIFA nationality.

No.	Pos.	Nation	Player
2	DF	BRA	Breno Cézar (from (Brazil) Betinense)
4	DF	JPN	Naoya Okane (from (Japan) FC Gifu)
5	DF	JPN	Daiki Umei (from (Japan) Fukushima United FC)
6	DF	JPN	Naoto Kidoku (from (Japan) Fagiano Okayama)
8	MF	BRA	Samuel Alves (from (Portugal) Vitoria Sernache)
9	FW	BRA	João Gabriel (from (Brazil) Cruzeiro)
13	FW	JPN	Yuichi Kubo (from (Japan) Fagiano Okayama)
15	MF	JPN	Shinji Tsujio (from (Japan) Zweigen Kanazawa)
19	DF	JPN	Seiya Yamaguchi (from (Japan) Sarcos Fukui)
20	DF	JPN	Natsuki Mugikura (from (Japan) Mito HollyHock)
22	DF	JPN	Yu Yonehara (from Kwansei Gakuin University)
24	MF	JPN	Daiki Kawato (from Nippon Sport Science University)
25	MF	JPN	Tomoya Takahata (from Ritsumeikan University)
28	FW	KOR	Go Daimu (from (Japan) Blaublitz Akita)
38	MF	JPN	Takanori Chiaki (from (Japan) Oita Trinita)

Out: Note: Flags indicate national team as defined under FIFA eligibility rules; some limited exceptions apply. Players may hold more than one non-FIFA nationality.

No.	Pos.	Nation	Player
1	GK	JPN	Tsuyoshi Sato (to (Japan) VONDS Ichihara)
2	DF	JPN	Kota Amano (retired)
5	MF	BRA	Toró (to (Japan) Goias EC)
7	FW	JPN	Taira Inoue (retired)
8	MF	JPN	Keita Sogabe (released)
13	MF	JPN	Yohei Sakai (released)
14	MF	JPN	Ryota Iwabuchi (to (Japan) Grulla Morioka)
15	DF	JPN	Masatoshi Aki (to (Japan) VONDS Ichihara, previously on loan)
18	FW	JPN	Kohei Hattori (to (Japan) Tochigi SC)
19	DF	JPN	Kyosuke Narita (released)
20	MF	JPN	Keita Makiuchi (released)
21	MF	JPN	Takahisa Kitahara (to (Japan) VONDS Ichihara)
22	DF	JPN	Yosuke Terada (retired)
27	MF	JPN	Yuki Handa (released)
29	FW	JPN	Masatoshi Ishida (back to (Japan) Kyoto Sanga, previously on loan)
30	MF	KOR	Kim Young-hwang (to (Japan) Vanraure Hachinohe)
36	FW	JPN	Masaki Fukai (retired)
—	DF	JPN	Norihiro Kawakami (to (Japan) Tegevajaro Miyazaki, previously on loan)

== Grulla Morioka ==
In: Note: Flags indicate national team as defined under FIFA eligibility rules; some limited exceptions apply. Players may hold more than one non-FIFA nationality.

No.	Pos.	Nation	Player
3	DF	JPN	Tomoya Fukuda (on loan from (Japan) Machida Zelvia)
6	MF	JPN	Takuya Kakine (from (Japan) Machida Zelvia, previously on loan)
9	FW	PRK	Kim Hong-yeon (from (Japan) Fukushima United FC)
17	DF	JPN	Sho Tanaka (from Toin University of Yokohama)
18	FW	JPN	Kohei Imazeki (from Toin University of Yokohama)
19	MF	JPN	Gaku Sugamoto (from Rikkyo University)
21	GK	JPN	Hiromi Nakajima (from (Japan) Briobecca Urayasu)
41	MF	JPN	Ryota Iwabuchi (from (Japan) SC Sagamihara)

Out: Note: Flags indicate national team as defined under FIFA eligibility rules; some limited exceptions apply. Players may hold more than one non-FIFA nationality.

No.	Pos.	Nation	Player
3	DF	JPN	Ryota Kobayashi (retired)
6	MF	JPN	Taku Ushinohama (to (Japan) Tochigi SC)
7	FW	JPN	Ryota Doi (to (Japan) Fujieda MYFC)
8	MF	JPN	Kenta Matsuda (retired)
13	FW	JPN	Mitsuteru Kudo (back to (Japan) Consadole Sapporo, previously on loan)
18	MF	JPN	Yuma Takahashi (released)
20	MF	JPN	Keita Ishii (back to (Japan) Yokohama FC, previously on loan)
21	GK	JPN	Takuji Yokoyama (to (Japan) ReinMeer Aomori)
27	MF	JPN	Yusaku Toyoshima (to (Japan) Tochigi UVA FC)
28	DF	JPN	Yugo Iiyama (released)
29	FW	JPN	Hiromu Kori (back to (Japan) Tokyo Verdy, previously on loan)

== Fukushima United F.C. ==
In: Note: Flags indicate national team as defined under FIFA eligibility rules; some limited exceptions apply. Players may hold more than one non-FIFA nationality.

No.	Pos.	Nation	Player
3	DF	JPN	Takuya Osanai (from (Japan) Hokkaido Consadole Sapporo, previously on loan)
11	MF	JPN	Shota Tamura (on loan from (Japan) Shonan Bellmare)
16	GK	JPN	Daiki Hotta (from Tokai University)
20	MF	BRA	Renan (from (Brazil) Roma Esporte Apucarana)
30	DF	JPN	Takaaki Kinoshita (on loan from (Japan) Mito HollyHock)

Out: Note: Flags indicate national team as defined under FIFA eligibility rules; some limited exceptions apply. Players may hold more than one non-FIFA nationality.

No.	Pos.	Nation	Player
3	DF	JPN	Akihiro Noda (retired)
4	DF	JPN	Kenta Togawa (retired)
10	FW	PRK	Kim Hong-yeon (to (Japan) Grulla Morioka)
15	MF	JPN	Takuya Maruoka (to (Japan) Tochigi UVA FC)
17	DF	JPN	Goson Sakai (back to (Japan) Albirex Niigata, previously on loan)
22	FW	BRA	Rodrigo Tiui (released)
23	DF	BRA	Paulão (back to (Japan) Hokkaido Consadole Sapporo, previously on loan)
28	DF	JPN	Shota Fukuoka (back to (Japan) Shonan Bellmare, previously on loan)
33	GK	JPN	Kei Uemura (retired)
39	DF	JPN	Daiki Umei (to (Japan) SC Sagamihara)

== Gainare Tottori ==
In: Note: Flags indicate national team as defined under FIFA eligibility rules; some limited exceptions apply. Players may hold more than one non-FIFA nationality.

No.	Pos.	Nation	Player
3	DF	JPN	Yuki Uchiyama (from (Japan) Hokkaido Consadole Sapporo)
6	DF	JPN	Kosei Ishigami (from (Japan) Mito HollyHock)
11	FW	JPN	Takuto Haraguchi (from (Japan) Renofa Yamaguchi)
15	MF	JPN	Koki Ishii (from Kansai University)
16	MF	JPN	Hayato Ikegaya (from (Japan) Mito HollyHock, previously on loan)
17	FW	JPN	Junya Kato (from Josai International University)
18	FW	JPN	Daiki Numa (on loan from (Japan) Kyoto Sanga)
20	FW	JPN	Ryuolivier Iwamoto (on loan from (Japan) Júbilo Iwata)
24	DF	JPN	Yuya Nishijima (from Fukuoka University)
31	GK	JPN	Ayumu Hosoda (promoted from youth ranks)

Out: Note: Flags indicate national team as defined under FIFA eligibility rules; some limited exceptions apply. Players may hold more than one non-FIFA nationality.

No.	Pos.	Nation	Player
3	DF	JPN	Ryosuke Kawanabe (retired)
6	DF	JPN	Takanori Nakajima (released)
8	MF	JPN	Kenji Koyano (retired)
10	MF	BRA	Fernandinho (from (Brazil) AFE)
20	FW	JPN	Tsuyoshi Miyaichi (back to (Japan) Shonan Bellmare, previously on loan)
22	MF	MAS	Tam Sheang Tsung (from (Malaysia) Melaka United)
24	FW	JPN	Masayoshi Takayanagi (released)
31	GK	JPN	Hironobu Yoshizaki (from (Japan) MIO Biwako Shiga)
39	GK	JPN	Haruki Fukushima (to (Japan) Urawa Red Diamonds, back from loan)

== YSCC Yokohama ==
In: Note: Flags indicate national team as defined under FIFA eligibility rules; some limited exceptions apply. Players may hold more than one non-FIFA nationality.

No.	Pos.	Nation	Player
11	FW	JPN	Kenji Kitawaki (from (Japan) Tokyo Verdy)
14	MF	JPN	Kyosuke Goto (from (Montenegro) FK Istra)
15	MF	JPN	Koya Okuda (from Kanagawa University)
16	GK	POL	Filip Wichman (from (Poland) Concordia Elbląg)
18	MF	JPN	Taisei Kaneko (promoted from youth ranks)
19	MF	JPN	Yusuke Nishiyama (from Yamanashi Gakuin University)
21	MF	JPN	Kensho Ogasawara (from Nippon Sport Science University)
23	MF	JPN	Kyoga Nakamura (from (Japan) JEF United Chiba)
24	DF	JPN	Hiroki Okuda (from (Japan) Kochi United SC)
26	DF	JPN	Hiroya Iwakabe (from Tokai University)
27	MF	JPN	Hayata Komatsu (from Juntendo University)
28	DF	JPN	Kohei Ueda (promoted from youth ranks)
29	MF	CHN	Zhang Shuai (from (China) Tianjin Teda)
32	FW	JPN	Daisuke Kitahara (from Tokai University)

Out: Note: Flags indicate national team as defined under FIFA eligibility rules; some limited exceptions apply. Players may hold more than one non-FIFA nationality.

No.	Pos.	Nation	Player
1	GK	JPN	Kenji Moriyama (released)
2	DF	JPN	Mitsuki Watanabe (retired)
11	FW	JPN	Sho Aota (released)
14	MF	JPN	Yusuke Miura (to (Japan) Suzuka Unlimited FC)
15	DF	JPN	Tomoyuki Katabira (released)
18	FW	JPN	Masato Sasaki (to (Japan) Fujieda MYFC)
21	DF	JPN	Takahito Ichinoi (to (Japan) Tokyo 23 FC)
23	MF	JPN	Masaya Nozaki (to (Japan) Nagano Parceiro)
26	FW	JPN	Kentaro Gunji (released)
28	MF	JPN	Yumu Kudo (released)
29	DF	JPN	Takaki Tomozawa (released)
33	FW	EGY	Osama Elsamni (released)

== Azul Claro Numazu ==
In: Note: Flags indicate national team as defined under FIFA eligibility rules; some limited exceptions apply. Players may hold more than one non-FIFA nationality.

No.	Pos.	Nation	Player
1	GK	JPN	Kengo Fukumode (unattached)
2	DF	JPN	Tomoki Fujisaki (from Kokushikan University)
11	FW	JPN	Koki Maezawa (from (Japan) Sony Sendai)
15	DF	JPN	Takuya Sugai (from (Japan) Vanraure Hachinohe)
16	MF	JPN	Masanobu Komaki (on loan from (Japan) Roasso Kumamoto)
20	GK	JPN	Ryo Ishii (on loan from (Japan) Mito HollyHock)
21	DF	JPN	Shimon Watanabe (from (Australia) FNQ FC Heat)
25	MF	JPN	Teruyoshi Ito (from (Japan) Blaublitz Akita)
27	DF	JPN	Masanobu Matsufuji (from (Japan) Sony Sendai)
28	MF	JPN	Tomoki Taniguchi (from (Japan) Nara Club)
29	FW	JPN	Ryota Watanabe (from (Japan) Ehime FC, previously on loan at (Japan) Nagano Parceiro)
31	GK	JPN	Shogo Onishi (from (Japan) Ehime FC)
32	MF	JPN	Kohei Kurata (from (Japan) Matsumoto Yamaga, previously on loan)

Out: Note: Flags indicate national team as defined under FIFA eligibility rules; some limited exceptions apply. Players may hold more than one non-FIFA nationality.

No.	Pos.	Nation	Player
1	GK	JPN	Junya Fukisawa (released)
2	DF	JPN	Takao Ishikawa (retired)
6	MF	JPN	Naoki Miyata (to (Japan) Tegevajaro Miyazaki)
11	FW	JPN	Naoki Mano (released)
15	DF	JPN	Kanta Takahashi (to (Japan) ReinMeer Aomori)
16	MF	JPN	Masato Mizuki (to (Japan) ReinMeer Aomori)
20	FW	JPN	Makoto Nakasuji (to (Japan) ReinMeer Aomori)
21	GK	JPN	Takuya Ohata (released)
26	DF	JPN	Yuya Mitsunaga (back to (Japan) Avispa Fukuoka, previously on loan)
28	DF	JPN	Kenshiro Tanioku (back to (Japan) Matsumoto Yamaga, previously on loan)
29	MF	JPN	Suguru Hashimoto (released)
31	GK	JPN	Ryosuke Ishida (retired)
36	MF	JPN	Akira Takase (to (Japan) ReinMeer Aomori)
