= 2014 Fujieda MYFC season =

Fujieda MYFC
2014 season
- Chairman: Jun Koyama
- Manager: Musashi Mizushima
Home colours	Away colours

The 2014 Fujieda MYFC season sees Fujieda MYFC compete in J. League Division 3 for the first team.

== Players ==
=== First team squad ===
As of 13 February 2014 Note: Flags indicate national team as defined under FIFA eligibility rules; some limited exceptions apply. Players may hold more than one non-FIFA nationality.

No.	Pos.	Nation	Player
1	GK	JPN	Hiroyuki Matsumoto
3	DF	JPN	Hiroki Narabayashi
4	DF	JPN	Kazushi Uchida
5	DF	ITA	Desmond
6	MF	JPN	Daijirou Okuda
7	DF	JPN	Masaya Sato
8	FW	JPN	Takumi Hashimoto
9	FW	JPN	Yusuke Ishii
10	MF	JPN	Ken Hisatomi
11	FW	JPN	Takahisa Nishiyama
14	MF	JPN	Yuhei Marumoto
15	FW	JPN	Mitsuru Mansho

No.	Pos.	Nation	Player
16	MF	JPN	Masato Mizuki
17	DF	JPN	Ryuji Mochizuki
18	FW	JPN	Tsugutoshi Oishi
19	DF	JPN	Shunya Ando
21	FW	JPN	Takahiro Tanio
22	MF	JPN	Yuichiro Edamoto
23	DF	JPN	Shogo Nakatsuru
24	DF	JPN	Yuta Kutsukake
25	DF	JPN	Daisuke Ichikawa
26	GK	KOR	Park Il-gyu
31	GK	JPN	Kenta Oishi

== J3 League ==
=== League table ===
Pos	Team	Pld	W	D	L	GF	GA	GD	Pts
8	Blaublitz Akita	33	10	4	19	38	57	−19	34
9	FC Ryukyu	33	8	10	15	31	50	−19	34
10	J.League U-22 Selection	33	9	6	18	37	63	−26	33
11	Fujieda MYFC	33	7	9	17	36	52	−16	30
12	YSCC Yokohama	33	4	12	17	29	58	−29	24

Source: J.League
Rules for classification: 1) Points; 2) Goal differential; 3) Goals scored; 4) Head-to-head results; 5) Disciplinary points; 6) Draw.

=== Results ===
9 March 2014 1	Machida Zelvia	3 - 0	Fujieda MYFC	Machida Athletic Stadium
Sunday 13:00	Endo 1'; Suzuki 53'; Kijima 57'	Report		Attendance: 4,569; Referee: Araki

16 March 2014 2	Fujieda MYFC	2 - 4	J. League U-22	Fujieda Sports Complex Park
Sunday 13:00	Hisatomi 50'; Tanio 85'	Report	Kimura 16'; Havenaar 22' (yellow card) 56'; Koyamatsu 76'; Tamura 90+4'	Attendance: 2,513; Referee: Yamoaka

23 March 2014 3	Fujieda MYFC	2 - 2	FC Ryūkyū	Fujieda Sports Complex Park
Sunday 13:00	Narabayashi (yellow card) 51'; Mizuki 58' 82' (yellow card) 90+1'	Report	Urashima 10'; Fujisawa 19'; Aoki (yellow card) 78'	Attendance: 856; Referee: Gonda

30 March 2014 4	Nagano Parceiro	1 - 4	Fujieda MYFC	Saku Central Athletic Park Stadium
Sunday 13:00	Ohashi (yellow card) 21'; Hatada 54' (yellow card) 85'; Arinaga (yellow card) 65'; Oshima (yellow card) 90+2'	Report	T Oishi 6', 15', 31', 52'; Nakatsuru (yellow card) 63'	Attendance: 1,655; Referee: Nishiyama

6 April 2014 5	Fujieda MYFC	0 - 0	Fukushima United	Fujieda Sports Complex Park
Sunday 13:00	Okuda (yellow card) 58'	Report	Ishido (yellow card) 88'	Attendance: 1,046; Referee: Hosoo

13 April 2014 5	Fujieda MYFC	v	Gainare Tottori	Fujieda Sports Complex Park
Sunday 13:00

== Squad statistics ==
=== Appearances and goals ===
As of 6 April 2014

No.	Pos	Nat	Player	Total		J3		Shizuoka Cup		Emperor's Cup	
No.	Pos	Nat	Player	Apps	Goals	Apps	Goals	Apps	Goals	Apps	Goals
1	GK	(Japan) JPN	Hiroyuki Matsumoto	1	0	1	0	0	0	0	0
3	DF	(Japan) JPN	Hiroki Narabayashi	4	0	4	0	0	0	0	0
4	DF	(Japan) JPN	Kazushi Uchida	3	0	1+2	0	0	0	0	0
5	DF	(Italy) ITA	Desmond	0	0	0	0	0	0	0	0
6	MF	(Japan) JPN	Daijirou Okuda	2	0	1+1	0	0	0	0	0
7	DF	(Japan) JPN	Masaya Sato	5	0	5	0	0	0	0	0
8	FW	(Japan) JPN	Takumi Hashimoto	4	0	4	0	0	0	0	0
9	FW	(Japan) JPN	Yusuke Ishii	0	0	0	0	0	0	0	0
10	MF	(Japan) JPN	Ken Hisatomi	5	1	5	1	0	0	0	0
11	FW	(Japan) JPN	Takahisa Nishiyama	3	0	2+1	0	0	0	0	0
14	MF	(Japan) JPN	Yuhei Marumoto	4	0	4	0	0	0	0	0
15	FW	(Japan) JPN	Mitsuru Mansho	4	0	4	0	0	0	0	0
16	MF	(Japan) JPN	Masato Mizuki	5	2	5	2	0	0	0	0
17	DF	(Japan) JPN	Ryuji Mochizuki	0	0	0	0	0	0	0	0
18	FW	(Japan) JPN	Tsugutoshi Oishi	3	4	2+1	4	0	0	0	0
19	DF	(Japan) JPN	Shunya Ando	5	0	5	0	0	0	0	0
21	FW	(Japan) JPN	Takahiro Tanio	5	1	3+2	1	0	0	0	0
22	MF	(Japan) JPN	Yuichiro Edamoto	2	0	1+1	0	0	0	0	0
23	DF	(Japan) JPN	Shogo Nakatsuru	3	0	0+3	0	0	0	0	0
24	DF	(Japan) JPN	Yuta Kutsukake	3	0	3	0	0	0	0	0
25	DF	(Japan) JPN	Daisuke Ichikawa	0	0	0	0	0	0	0	0
26	GK	(South Korea) KOR	Park Il-gyu	4	0	4	0	0	0	0	0
31	GK	(Japan) JPN	Kenta Oishi	0	0	0	0	0	0	0	0

=== Top scorers ===
Position	Nation	Number	Name	J3	Shizuoka Cup	Emperor's Cup	Total
MF	(Japan)	10	Ken Hisatomi	1	0	0	1
FW	(Japan)	21	Takahiro Tanio	1	0	0	1
MF	(Japan)	16	Masato Mizuki	2	0	0	2
FW	(Japan)	18	Tsugutoshi Oishi	4	0	0	4
			TOTALS	8	0	0	8

=== Disciplinary record ===
Number	Nation	Position	Name	J3			Shizuoka Cup			Emperor's Cup			Total		
Number	Nation	Position	Name	Booked	(yellow card) (yellow-red card)	Sent off (straight red)	Booked	(yellow card) (yellow-red card)	Sent off (straight red)	Booked	(yellow card) (yellow-red card)	Sent off (straight red)	Booked	(yellow card) (yellow-red card)	Sent off (straight red)
3	(Japan)	DF	Hiroki Narabayashi	1	0	0	0	0	0	0	0	0	1	0	0
16	(Japan)	MF	Masato Mizuki	1	0	0	0	0	0	0	0	0	1	0	0
23	(Japan)	DF	Shogo Nakatsuru	1	0	0	0	0	0	0	0	0	1	0	0
6	(Japan)	MF	Daijirou Okuda	1	0	0	0	0	0	0	0	0	1	0	0
			TOTALS	4	0	0	0	0	0	0	0	0	4	0	0
