= 2016 Giravanz Kitakyushu season =

Giravanz Kitakyushu
2016 season
- Manager: Koichi Hashiratani
- Stadium: Honjo Stadium
- J2 League: 22nd
Home colours	Away colours

2016 Giravanz Kitakyushu season.

== Squad ==
As of April 23, 2016

Note: Flags indicate national team as defined under FIFA eligibility rules; some limited exceptions apply. Players may hold more than one non-FIFA nationality.

No.	Pos.	Nation	Player
1	GK	JPN	Nobuyuki Abe
2	DF	JPN	Naoya Ishigami
3	DF	JPN	Kenta Hoshihara
4	MF	JPN	Keita Ichikawa
5	DF	JPN	Kazuya Maeda
6	DF	JPN	Hiroyuki Nishijima
7	MF	JPN	Koki Kazama
8	MF	JPN	Tsuyoshi Hakkaku
9	FW	JPN	Kazuki Hara
10	MF	JPN	Koki Kotegawa
11	MF	JPN	Shota Inoue
13	DF	JPN	Takayuki Tada
14	FW	JPN	Tomoki Ikemoto
15	FW	JPN	Hideo Oshima
16	DF	JPN	Kyohei Yumisaki

No.	Pos.	Nation	Player
17	MF	JPN	Koken Kato
18	MF	JPN	Yohei Naito
19	MF	JPN	Daichi Kawashima
20	MF	JPN	Sho Hanai
21	GK	JPN	Ayaki Suzuki
23	DF	JPN	Masahiro Teraoka
24	MF	JPN	Junpei Arai
25	FW	JPN	Rui Komatsu
26	DF	JPN	Yukiya Kajiwara
27	GK	JPN	Kaiho Nakayama
29	MF	JPN	Kengo Kotani
41	DF	JPN	Ryosuke Tone
43	MF	JPN	Masashi Motoyama

== J2 League ==
=== League table ===
Pos	Team	Pld	W	D	L	GF	GA	GD	Pts	Promotion, qualification or relegation
20	FC Gifu	42	12	7	23	47	71	−24	43	
21	Zweigen Kanazawa (X)	42	8	15	19	36	60	−24	39	Qualification for relegation playoffs (Note: The playoffs and direct exchange between J2 and J3 are subject to eligibility of J2-licensed teams in top 2 of 2016 J3 League.)
22	Giravanz Kitakyushu (R)	42	8	14	20	43	64	−21	38	Relegation to 2017 J3 League

Updated to match(es) played on 20 November 2016. Source: 2016 MEIJI YASUDA J2 LEAGUE League table
Rules for classification: 1) Points; 2) Goal difference; 3) Goals scored
(R) Relegated; (X) Relegation play-off winner

=== Match details ===
J2 League match details
Match	Date	Team	Score	Team	Venue	Attendance
1	2016.02.28	Giravanz Kitakyushu	1-0	Montedio Yamagata	Honjo Stadium	4,647
2	2016.03.06	Giravanz Kitakyushu	0-1	Renofa Yamaguchi FC	Honjo Stadium	3,812
3	2016.03.13	FC Gifu	1-0	Giravanz Kitakyushu	Gifu Nagaragawa Stadium	3,215
4	2016.03.20	Giravanz Kitakyushu	1-1	Roasso Kumamoto	Honjo Stadium	3,951
5	2016.03.26	Fagiano Okayama	2-0	Giravanz Kitakyushu	City Light Stadium	7,050
6	2016.04.03	Ehime FC	2-1	Giravanz Kitakyushu	Ningineer Stadium	2,514
7	2016.04.09	Giravanz Kitakyushu	0-4	Yokohama FC	Honjo Stadium	3,569
8	2016.04.17	Cerezo Osaka	1-1	Giravanz Kitakyushu	Yanmar Stadium Nagai	18,809
9	2016.04.23	Giravanz Kitakyushu	1-2	Shimizu S-Pulse	Honjo Stadium	2,589
10	2016.04.29	Kamatamare Sanuki	1-1	Giravanz Kitakyushu	Pikara Stadium	3,365
11	2016.05.03	Giravanz Kitakyushu	2-2	V-Varen Nagasaki	Honjo Stadium	3,219
12	2016.05.07	Mito HollyHock	1-1	Giravanz Kitakyushu	K's denki Stadium Mito	3,917
13	2016.05.15	FC Machida Zelvia	0-1	Giravanz Kitakyushu	Machida Stadium	4,722
14	2016.05.22	Giravanz Kitakyushu	1-2	Kyoto Sanga FC	Honjo Stadium	3,682
15	2016.05.28	Tokushima Vortis	1-0	Giravanz Kitakyushu	Pocarisweat Stadium	3,490
16	2016.06.04	Matsumoto Yamaga FC	2-1	Giravanz Kitakyushu	Matsumotodaira Park Stadium	11,140
17	2016.06.08	Giravanz Kitakyushu	0-3	Thespakusatsu Gunma	Honjo Stadium	2,115
18	2016.06.12	Giravanz Kitakyushu	3-2	Zweigen Kanazawa	Honjo Stadium	1,795
19	2016.06.19	Hokkaido Consadole Sapporo	1-0	Giravanz Kitakyushu	Sapporo Dome	11,957
20	2016.06.26	JEF United Chiba	1-2	Giravanz Kitakyushu	Fukuda Denshi Arena	10,344
21	2016.07.03	Giravanz Kitakyushu	2-1	Tokyo Verdy	Honjo Stadium	2,864
22	2016.07.10	Renofa Yamaguchi FC	5-1	Giravanz Kitakyushu	Ishin Memorial Park Stadium	6,232
23	2016.07.16	Giravanz Kitakyushu	1-2	Matsumoto Yamaga FC	Honjo Stadium	3,125
24	2016.07.20	Thespakusatsu Gunma	2-2	Giravanz Kitakyushu	Shoda Shoyu Stadium Gunma	2,831
25	2016.07.24	Yokohama FC	2-2	Giravanz Kitakyushu	NHK Spring Mitsuzawa Football Stadium	2,644
26	2016.07.31	Giravanz Kitakyushu	1-3	Fagiano Okayama	Honjo Stadium	3,575
27	2016.08.07	Zweigen Kanazawa	1-1	Giravanz Kitakyushu	Ishikawa Athletics Stadium	4,005
28	2016.08.11	Giravanz Kitakyushu	0-2	JEF United Chiba	Honjo Stadium	3,981
29	2016.08.14	Giravanz Kitakyushu	1-1	Ehime FC	Honjo Stadium	1,958
30	2016.08.21	Roasso Kumamoto	1-6	Giravanz Kitakyushu	Umakana-Yokana Stadium	4,549
31	2016.09.11	Giravanz Kitakyushu	0-1	Tokushima Vortis	Honjo Stadium	2,654
32	2016.09.18	Giravanz Kitakyushu	0-1	Cerezo Osaka	Honjo Stadium	2,434
33	2016.09.25	Kyoto Sanga FC	0-0	Giravanz Kitakyushu	Kyoto Nishikyogoku Athletic Stadium	6,919
34	2016.10.02	Giravanz Kitakyushu	0-0	Hokkaido Consadole Sapporo	Honjo Stadium	3,095
35	2016.10.08	Tokyo Verdy	1-1	Giravanz Kitakyushu	Ajinomoto Stadium	4,057
36	2016.10.16	Giravanz Kitakyushu	3-0	Kamatamare Sanuki	Honjo Stadium	2,307
37	2016.10.23	Shimizu S-Pulse	2-0	Giravanz Kitakyushu	IAI Stadium Nihondaira	12,159
38	2016.10.30	Giravanz Kitakyushu	2-1	FC Gifu	Honjo Stadium	3,700
39	2016.11.03	V-Varen Nagasaki	0-0	Giravanz Kitakyushu	Transcosmos Stadium Nagasaki	6,089
40	2016.11.06	Giravanz Kitakyushu	1-3	FC Machida Zelvia	Honjo Stadium	2,937
41	2016.11.12	Giravanz Kitakyushu	2-2	Mito HollyHock	Honjo Stadium	5,689
42	2016.11.20	Montedio Yamagata	3-0	Giravanz Kitakyushu	ND Soft Stadium Yamagata	6,624
