= Lee Jae-won =

Lee Jae-won may also refer to:

- Lee Jae-won (singer) (born 1980), South Korean singer
- Lee Jae-won (footballer, born 1983), South Korean association football player
- Lee Jae-won (actor) (born 1986), South Korean actor
- Lee Jae-won (footballer, born 1992), South Korean association football player
- Lee Jae-won (footballer, born 1997), South Korean association football player
- Lee Jae-won (baseball) (born 1988), South Korean baseball player
- Jae Won Lee, Korean American ceramic artist
