= Takuji =

- Gender: Male

Origin
- Origin: Japanese
- Meaning: Different meanings depending on the kanji used

Takuji (written: 宅治, 拓児, 拓司, 拓自, 卓司, 卓治, 卓次 or 卓爾) is a masculine Japanese given name. Notable people with the name include:

- Takuji Hayata (早田 卓次; born 1940), Japanese gymnast
- Takuji Ichikawa (市川 拓司; born 1962), Japanese writer
- Takuji Iwasaki (岩崎 卓爾; 1869–1937), Japanese biologist, ethnologist and historian
- Takuji Kawakubo (川久保 拓司; born 1981), Japanese actor
- Takuji Miyoshi (三好 拓児; born 1978), Japanese footballer
- Takuji Yamada (山田 拓自; born 1979), Japanese Go player
- Takuji Yamashita (山下 宅治; 1874–1959), Japanese American activist
- Takuji Yanagimoto (柳本 卓治; born 1944), Japanese politician
- Takuji Yokoyama (横山 卓司; born 1990), Japanese footballer
- Takuji Yonemoto (米本 拓司; born 1990), Japanese footballer
