= Mihashi =

Mihashi (written: 三橋 lit. "three bridges") is a Japanese surname. Notable people with the surname include:

- Michiya Mihashi (三橋 美智也; 1930–1996), Japanese singer
- Takuya Mihashi (三橋 拓也; born 1992), Japanese footballer
- Tatsuya Mihashi (三橋 達也; 1923–2004), Japanese actor
