= 2016 Grulla Morioka season =

Grulla Morioka
2016 season
- Manager: Akihiko Kamikawa
- Stadium: Iwagin Stadium
- J3 League: 13th of 16
Home colours	Away colours

2016 Grulla Morioka season.

== J3 League ==
=== League table ===
Pos	Team	Pld	W	D	L	GF	GA	GD	Pts
11	SC Sagamihara	30	9	8	13	29	46	−17	35
12	Cerezo Osaka U-23	30	8	8	14	38	47	−9	32
13	Grulla Morioka	30	6	12	12	43	47	−4	30
14	Fukushima United	30	7	9	14	35	44	−9	30
15	Gainare Tottori	30	8	6	16	30	47	−17	30

Updated to match(es) played on 20 November 2016. Source: 2016 MEIJI YASUDA J3 LEAGUE League table
Rules for classification: 1) Points; 2) Goal difference; 3) Goals scored; 4th) head-to-head results; 5th) disciplinary points; 6th) draw

=== Match details ===
J3 League match details
Match	Date	Team	Score	Team	Venue	Attendance
1	2016.03.13	Cerezo Osaka U-23	2-0	Grulla Morioka	Kincho Stadium	1,869
2	2016.03.20	Gamba Osaka U-23	4-1	Grulla Morioka	Suita City Football Stadium	2,870
3	2016.04.03	Grulla Morioka	0-1	AC Nagano Parceiro	Iwagin Stadium	1,434
4	2016.04.10	SC Sagamihara	0-0	Grulla Morioka	Sagamihara Gion Stadium	2,940
5	2016.04.17	Grulla Morioka	2-3	FC Ryukyu	Iwagin Stadium	486
6	2016.04.24	Grulla Morioka	1-1	Blaublitz Akita	Iwagin Stadium	1,076
7	2016.05.01	Fujieda MYFC	3-2	Grulla Morioka	Fujieda Soccer Stadium	1,702
8	2016.05.08	Grulla Morioka	2-3	Kagoshima United FC	Iwagin Stadium	777
9	2016.05.15	Tochigi SC	1-1	Grulla Morioka	Tochigi Green Stadium	3,477
10	2016.05.22	Grulla Morioka	3-0	YSCC Yokohama	Iwagin Stadium	1,498
11	2016.05.29	Grulla Morioka	1-1	Kataller Toyama	Iwagin Stadium	1,036
12	2016.06.12	Fukushima United FC	3-1	Grulla Morioka	Toho Stadium	1,097
13	2016.06.19	Grulla Morioka	1-1	Oita Trinita	Iwagin Stadium	1,255
14	2016.06.26	FC Tokyo U-23	1-0	Grulla Morioka	Ajinomoto Field Nishigaoka	1,937
15	2016.07.03	Grulla Morioka	2-0	Gainare Tottori	Iwagin Stadium	881
16	2016.07.10	Kataller Toyama	1-3	Grulla Morioka	Toyama Stadium	2,710
17	2016.07.16	Grulla Morioka	1-0	Cerezo Osaka U-23	Iwagin Stadium	778
18	2016.07.23	YSCC Yokohama	0-0	Grulla Morioka	NHK Spring Mitsuzawa Football Stadium	806
19	2016.07.31	Grulla Morioka	0-0	Gamba Osaka U-23	Iwagin Stadium	1,280
20	2016.08.07	Gainare Tottori	3-3	Grulla Morioka	Tottori Bank Bird Stadium	2,335
21	2016.09.11	Grulla Morioka	1-1	FC Tokyo U-23	Iwagin Stadium	1,102
22	2016.09.19	FC Ryukyu	4-2	Grulla Morioka	Okinawa Athletic Park Stadium	1,150
23	2016.09.25	Grulla Morioka	1-2	Fujieda MYFC	Iwagin Stadium	923
24	2016.10.02	Blaublitz Akita	2-0	Grulla Morioka	Akigin Stadium	3,380
25	2016.10.16	Grulla Morioka	5-0	SC Sagamihara	Iwagin Stadium	1,006
26	2016.10.23	Oita Trinita	4-2	Grulla Morioka	Oita Bank Dome	7,680
27	2016.10.30	AC Nagano Parceiro	0-0	Grulla Morioka	Minami Nagano Sports Park Stadium	3,905
28	2016.11.05	Grulla Morioka	4-2	Fukushima United FC	Iwagin Stadium	1,396
29	2016.11.13	Kagoshima United FC	2-2	Grulla Morioka	Kagoshima Kamoike Stadium	4,975
30	2016.11.20	Grulla Morioka	2-2	Tochigi SC	Iwagin Stadium	2,888
