= Akio Yoshida =

Japanese footballer (born 1986)

Akio Yoshida 吉田 明生
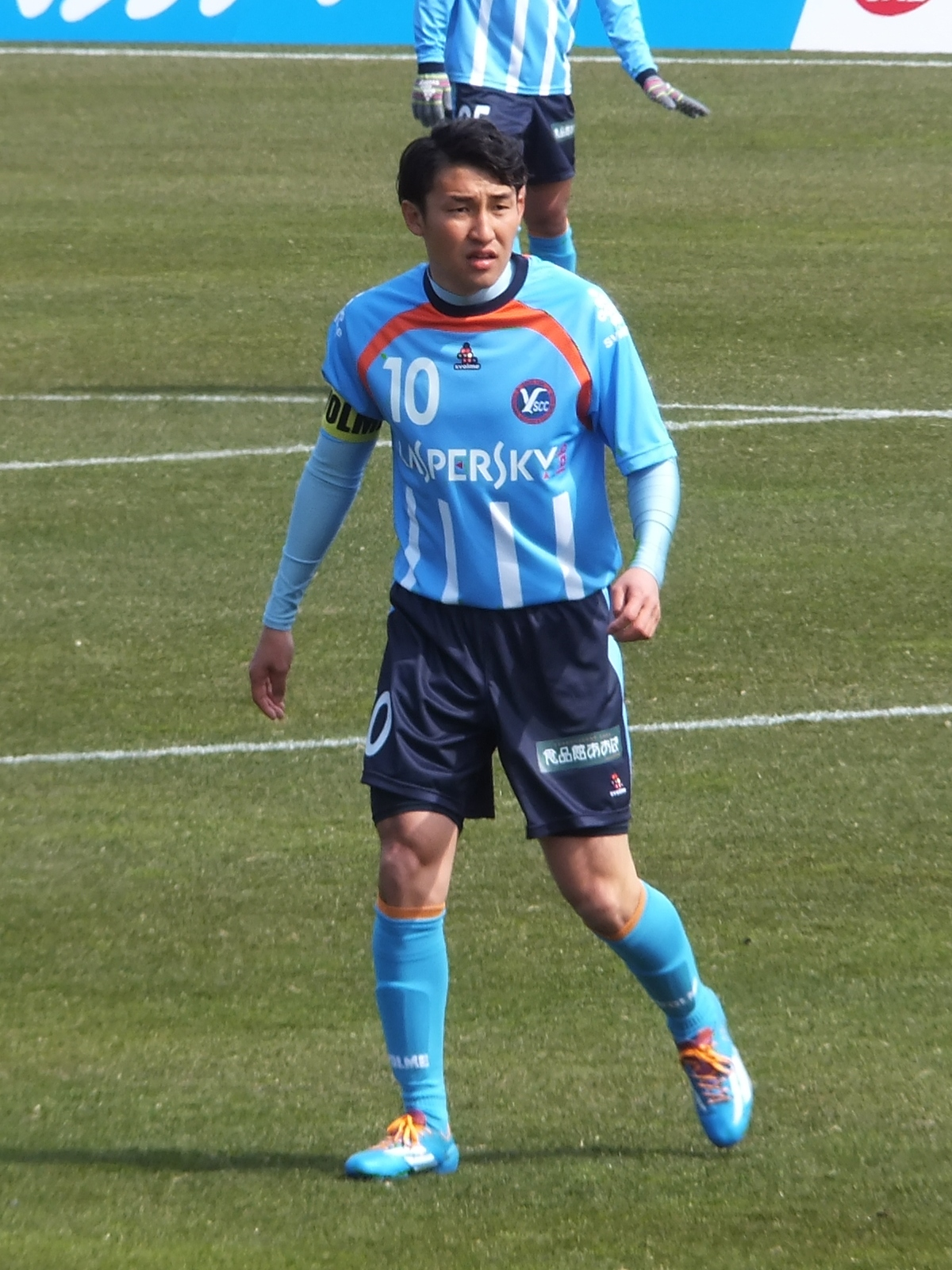

Personal information
- Full name: Akio Yoshida
- Date of birth: 3 December 1986 (age 39)
- Place of birth: Kanagawa, Japan
- Height: 1.70 m (5 ft 7 in)
- Position: Midfielder

Youth career
- 2005–2008: Tokai University

Senior career*
Years	Team	Apps	(Gls)
2010	Arte Takasaki	17	(0)
2011–2022	YSCC Yokohama	331	(44)
- * Club domestic league appearances and goals as of 27 November 2022, 8:36 (UTC)

Akio Yoshida (吉田 明生, Yoshida Akio; born 3 December 1986) is a Japanese former footballer who played as a midfielder.

== Club career ==
Akio Yoshida attended Buso Junior and Senior High School at Yokohama, Kanagawa Prefecture and later graduated from Tokai University where he was captain of the soccer team. He left in 2009 due to surgery following a knee injury, but joined Arte Takasaki in 2010. He left the club in 2010 after one season.

In 2011, Akio Yoshida moved to YSCC Yokohama in his hometown of Kanagawa Prefecture. In 2014, he signed a professional contract with the club and scored 10 goals in J3. He was captain for two seasons in 2014.

On 30 December 2022, Yoshida announced that he was officially retiring from football after playing professionally for 13 years with Arte Takasaki and YSCC Yokohama from 2010 and 2011, respectively.

== Personal life ==
Yoshida is most appearances is 251 games in J3 League since 2014.

== Career statistics ==
As of the end 2022 season.

=== Club ===
Appearances and goals by club, season and competition
Club performance			League		Cup		Total	
Season	Club	League	Apps	Goals	Apps	Goals	Apps	Goals
Japan			League		Emperor's Cup		Total	
2010	Arte Takasaki	JFL	17	0	1	0	18	0
2010	Total		17	0	1	0	18	0
2011	YSCC Yokohama	JRL (Kantō, Div. 1)	14	5	1	0	15	5
2012	YSCC Yokohama	JFL	32	7	2	2	34	9
2013	YSCC Yokohama	JFL	34	7	–		34	7
2014	YSCC Yokohama	J3 League	33	10	2	1	35	11
2015	YSCC Yokohama	J3 League	36	4	0	0	36	4
2016	YSCC Yokohama	J3 League	30	1	–		30	1
2017	YSCC Yokohama	J3 League	29	2	1	0	30	2
2018	YSCC Yokohama	J3 League	28	3	2	1	30	4
2019	YSCC Yokohama	J3 League	30	3	–		33	3
2020	YSCC Yokohama	J3 League	22	0	–		22	0
2021	YSCC Yokohama	J3 League	14	2	2	0	16	2
2022	YSCC Yokohama	J3 League	29	0	–		29	0
2022	Total		331	44	10	4	341	48
Career total			348	44	11	4	359	48
