= Umei =

Umei is a surname. Notable people with the surname include:

- Daiki Umei (born 1989), Japanese footballer
- Taisei Umei (born 1998), Japanese kickboxer
