= Kazushi =

- Gender: Male

Origin
- Origin: Japanese
- Meaning: Different meanings depending on the kanji used

Kazushi (written: 和志, 和司, 和士, 和史, 一志 or 一至) is a masculine Japanese given name. Notable people with the name include:

- Kazushi Hagiwara (萩原 一至; born 1963), Japanese manga artist
- Kazushi Hano (羽野 一志; born 1991), Japanese rugby sevens player
- Kazushi Hosaka (保坂 和志; born 1956), Japanese writer
- Kazushi Isoyama (磯山 和司; born 1975), Japanese footballer
- Kazushi Kimura (木村 和司; born 1958), Japanese footballer and manager
- Kazushi Mitsuhira (三平 和司; born 1988), Japanese footballer
- Kazushi Miyamoto (宮本 和志; born 1979), Japanese professional wrestler
- Kazushi Ono (大野 和士; born 1960), Japanese conductor
- Kazushi Sakuraba (桜庭 和志; born 1969), Japanese mixed martial artist and professional wrestler
- Kazushi Uchida (内田 和志; born 1987), Japanese footballer
- Kazushi Yamada (山田 和司; born 1987), Japanese badminton player
