= Seiya Yamaguchi =

Japanese footballer

Seiya Yamaguchi 山口 聖矢
Personal information
- Full name: Seiya Yamaguchi
- Date of birth: September 2, 1993 (age 33)
- Place of birth: Zama, Kanagawa, Japan
- Height: 1.74 m (5 ft 8 1/2 in)
- Position: Defender

Team information
- Current team: SC Sagamihara
- Number: 30

Youth career
- 2012–2015: Kanto Gakuin University

Senior career*
| Years | Team | Apps | (Gls) |
| 2016 | Saurcos Fukui | 2 | (0) |
| 2017– | SC Sagamihara | 1 | (0) |
- * Club domestic league appearances and goals as of 22 February 2018

Seiya Yamaguchi (山口 聖矢, Yamaguchi Seiya; born September 2, 1993) is a Japanese football player. He plays for SC Sagamihara.

== Career ==
Seiya Yamaguchi joined Japanese Regional Leagues club Saurcos Fukui in 2016. In 2017, he moved to J3 League club SC Sagamihara.

== Club statistics ==
Updated to 22 February 2018.

| Club performance | | | League | | Cup | | Total | |
| Season | Club | League | Apps | Goals | Apps | Goals | Apps | Goals |
| Japan | | | League | | Emperor's Cup | | Total | |
|---|---|---|---|---|---|---|---|---|
| 2016 | Saurcos Fukui | JRL (Hokushinetsu, Div. 1) | 2 | 0 | – | | 2 | 0 |
| 2015 | SC Sagamihara | J3 League | 1 | 0 | – | | 1 | 0 |
| Total | | | 3 | 0 | 0 | 0 | 3 | 0 |
