= Yusuke Miura =

Japanese footballer (born 1991)

Personal information
- Full name: Yusuke Miura
- Date of birth: August 27, 1991 (age 35)
- Place of birth: Setagaya, Japan
- Height: 1.78 m (5 ft 10 in)
- Position: Midfielder

Team information
- Current team: Tokyo Musashino City FC
- Number: 13

Youth career
- 2010–2013: Nihon University Football Team

Senior career*
Years	Team	Apps	(Gls)
2014–2016	YSCC Yokohama	28	(0)
2017	Suzuka Unlimited FC	1	(0)
2018–	Tokyo Musashino City FC		
- * Club domestic league appearances and goals as of 23 February 2018

Yusuke Miura (三浦 雄介, Miura Yusuke; born August 27, 1991 in Setagaya) is a Japanese football player for Tokyo Musashino City FC.

== Club statistics ==
Updated to 23 February 2018.

Club performance			League		Cup		Total	
Season	Club	League	Apps	Goals	Apps	Goals	Apps	Goals
Japan			League		Emperor's Cup		Total	
2014	YSCC Yokohama	J3 League	12	0	0	0	12	0
2015	YSCC Yokohama	J3 League	14	0	0	0	14	0
2016	YSCC Yokohama	J3 League	2	0	0	0	2	0
2017	Suzuka Unlimited FC	JRL (Tokai, Div. 1)	1	0	0	0	1	0
Career total			29	0	0	0	29	0
