= Kutsukake =

Kutsukake (written: 沓掛) is a Japanese surname. Notable people with the surname include:

- Tetsuo Kutsukake (沓掛 哲男, born 1929), Japanese politician
- Yuta Kutsukake (沓掛 勇太, born 1991), Japanese footballer

== Fictional characters ==
- Kutsukake Tokijirō (沓掛 時次郎) a character from a novel and several films including Kutsukake Tokijirō (1954 film)

== See also ==
- Kutsukake Station, a railway station in Shima, Mie Prefecture, Japan
- Kutsukake-shuku, a station of the Nakasendō
