= Taijiro Mori =

Japanese footballer (born 1991)

Personal information
- Full name: Taijiro Mori
- Date of birth: December 8, 1991 (age 34)
- Place of birth: Toyama, Japan
- Height: 1.74 m (5 ft 8 1/2 in)
- Position: Midfielder

Team information
- Current team: Toyama Shinjo
- Number: 32

Senior career*
Years	Team	Apps	(Gls)
2010–2015	Kataller Toyama	68	(2)
2014	→Sagawa Printing (loan)	19	(0)
2016	Stuttgarter Kickers II	8	(0)
2016-2019	1. FC Sonthofen	87	(3)
2019-2021	FC Ismaning	23	(2)
2022-	Toyama Shinjo	0	(0)
Total		87	(2)
- * Club domestic league appearances and goals

Taijiro Mori (森 泰次郎, Mori Taijiro; born December 8, 1991) is a Japanese footballer who plays as a midfielder for Toyama Shinjo in Hokushinetsu Football League.

== Career statistics ==
As of 14 October 2015

Appearances and goals by club, season and competition
Club	Season	League			Emperor's Cup		Total	
Club	Season	Division	Apps	Goals	Apps	Goals	Apps	Goals
Kataller Toyama	2010	J2 League	2	0	0	0	2	0
Kataller Toyama	2011	J2 League	12	1	0	0	12	1
Kataller Toyama	2012	J2 League	14	0	1	0	15	0
Kataller Toyama	2013	J2 League	14	0	0	0	14	0
Sagawa Printing	2014	Football League	19	0	—		19	0
Kataller Toyama	2014	J2 League	2	0	—		2	0
Kataller Toyama	2015	J3 League	24	1	—		24	1
Career total			87	2	1	0	88	2
