= Takumi Hashimoto =

Japanese footballer

Personal information
- Full name: Takumi Hashimoto
- Date of birth: 5 January 1989 (age 37)
- Place of birth: Sendai, Japan
- Height: 1.72 m (5 ft 8 in)
- Positions: Defender; midfielder

Youth career
- 2007–2010: Shizuoka Sangyo University SC

Senior career*
Years	Team	Apps	(Gls)
2011–2016	Fujieda MYFC	119	(15)
- * Club domestic league appearances and goals as of 23 February 2017

Takumi Hashimoto (橋本巧, Hashimoto Takumi; born 5 January 1989) is a former Japanese footballer who last played for Fujieda MYFC.

== Club statistics ==
Updated to 23 February 2017.

Appearances and goals by club, season and competition
Club	Season	League			Emperor's Cup		Total	
Club	Season	Division	Apps	Goals	Apps	Goals	Apps	Goals
Fujieda MYFC	2011	JRL (Tokai)	12	4	–		12	4
Fujieda MYFC	2012	JFL	28	6	–		28	6
Fujieda MYFC	2013	JFL	21	4	2	0	23	4
Fujieda MYFC	2014	J3 League	26	0	2	0	28	0
Fujieda MYFC	2015	J3 League	26	1	2	0	28	1
Fujieda MYFC	2016	J3 League	6	0	1	0	7	0
Career total			119	15	7	0	126	15
