= Takahisa Kitahara =

Japanese footballer (born 1990)

Personal information
- Date of birth: 18 October 1990 (age 36)
- Place of birth: Kawagoe, Saitama, Japan
- Height: 1.68 m (5 ft 6 in)
- Position: Midfielder

Team information
- Current team: SC Sagamihara
- Number: 21

Youth career
- 2009–2011: Takushoku University

Senior career*
| Years | Team | Apps | (Gls) |
| 2012– | SC Sagamihara | 38 | (0) |
- * Club domestic league appearances and goals as of 23 February 2016

Takahisa Kitahara (北原毅之, Kitahara, Takahisa; born 18 October 1990 in Kawagoe, Saitama) is a Japanese footballer who plays for SC Sagamihara.

== Club statistics ==
Updated to 23 February 2016.

| Club performance | | | League | | Cup | | Total | |
| Season | Club | League | Apps | Goals | Apps | Goals | Apps | Goals |
| Japan | | | League | | Emperor's Cup | | Total | |
|---|---|---|---|---|---|---|---|---|
| 2012 | SC Sagamihara | JRL (Kanto) | 4 | 0 | – | | 4 | 0 |
| 2013 | SC Sagamihara | JFL | 9 | 0 | – | | 9 | 0 |
| 2014 | SC Sagamihara | J3 League | 15 | 0 | – | | 15 | 0 |
| 2015 | SC Sagamihara | J3 League | 10 | 0 | – | | 10 | 0 |
| Career total | | | 38 | 0 | 0 | 0 | 38 | 0 |
