= Kim Hong-yeon =

North Korean footballer (born 1990)

Personal information
- Date of birth: June 12, 1990 (age 36)
- Place of birth: Aichi, Japan
- Height: 1.83 m (6 ft 0 in)
- Position: Forward

Youth career
- 2009–2012: Korea University

Senior career*
Years	Team	Apps	(Gls)
2013–2016	Fukushima United	94	(20)
2017	Grulla Morioka	15	(1)
2018–2020	Vanraure Hachinohe	16	(4)
2019	→ Nara Club (loan)	12	(2)
- * Club domestic league appearances and goals as of 14:53, 3 January 2021 (UTC)

Kim Hong-yeon (Korean: 김홍연; born June 12, 1990) is a North Korean football player.

== Club statistics ==
Updated to 23 February 2018.

Club performance			League		Cup		Total	
Season	Club	League	Apps	Goals	Apps	Goals	Apps	Goals
Japan			League		Emperor's Cup		Total	
2013	Fukushima United FC	JFL	30	5	2	1	32	6
2014	Fukushima United FC	J3 League	27	7	1	0	28	7
2015	Fukushima United FC	J3 League	24	6	1	0	25	6
2016	Fukushima United FC	J3 League	13	2	3	1	16	3
2017	Grulla Morioka	J3 League	15	1	1	0	16	1
Career total			109	21	7	2	116	23
