= Yuma Takahashi =

Japanese footballer

Personal information
- Full name: Yuma Takahashi
- Date of birth: April 25, 1990 (age 36)
- Place of birth: Chiba, Chiba, Japan
- Height: 1.79 m (5 ft 10 1/2 in)
- Position: Midfielder

Team information
- Current team: Grulla Morioka
- Number: 18

Youth career
- 2006–2008: JEF United Chiba Youth

Senior career*
Years	Team	Apps	(Gls)
2009–2010	JEF Reserves	20	(2)
2010	→ SAI Ichihara (loan)		
2011	Sagawa Printing	6	(1)
2012–	Grulla Morioka	42	(22)
- * Club domestic league appearances and goals as of December 31, 2015

Yuma Takahashi (高橋 悠馬, Takahashi Yūma; born April 25, 1990) is a Japanese football player for Grulla Morioka.

== Playing career ==
Yuma Takahashi joined to JEF Reserves in 2009. He moved to SAI Ichihara from July to August in 2010. In 2011, he moved to Sagawa Printing. In 2012, he moved to Grulla Morioka.

== Club statistics ==
Updated to 23 February 2016.

Club performance			League		Cup		Total	
Season	Club	League	Apps	Goals	Apps	Goals	Apps	Goals
Japan			League		Emperor's Cup		Total	
2009	JEF Reserves	JFL	13	0	0	0	13	0
2010	JEF Reserves	JFL	7	2	–		7	2
2010	SAI Ichihara	JRL (Kanto, Div. 2)			–			
2011	Sagawa Printing	JFL	6	1	0	0	6	1
2012	Grulla Morioka	JRL (Tohoku, Div. 1)	7	3	0	0	7	3
2013	Grulla Morioka	JRL (Tohoku, Div. 1)	11	13	1	0	12	13
2014	Grulla Morioka	J3 League	9	1	0	0	9	1
2015	Grulla Morioka	J3 League	15	5	1	0	16	5
Career total			0	0	0	0	0	0
