= Takuji Yokoyama =

Japanese footballer

Takuji Yokoyama 横山 卓司
Personal information
- Full name: Takuji Yokoyama
- Date of birth: 19 April 1990 (age 36)
- Place of birth: Fukushima, Japan
- Height: 1.82 m (6 ft 0 in)
- Position: Goalkeeper

Team information
- Current team: ReinMeer Aomori
- Number: 31

Youth career
- 2009–2012: Niigata University of Health and Welfare

Senior career*
| Years | Team | Apps | (Gls) |
| 2013–2016 | Grulla Morioka | 27 | (0) |
| 2017– | ReinMeer Aomori | 51 | (0) |
- * Club domestic league appearances and goals as of 23 February 2020

Takuji Yokoyama (横山 卓司, Yokoyama, Takuji; born 19 April 1990 in Fukushima) is a Japanese footballer who plays for ReinMeer Aomori.

== Career ==
After attending the Niigata University of Health and Welfare, Yokoyama signed for Grulla Morioka, where he spent four seasons. In 2017, he joined JFL team ReinMeer Aomori.

== Club statistics ==
Updated to 23 February 2020.

| Club performance | | | League | | Cup | | Total | |
| Season | Club | League | Apps | Goals | Apps | Goals | Apps | Goals |
| Japan | | | League | | Emperor's Cup | | Total | |
|---|---|---|---|---|---|---|---|---|
| 2013 | Grulla Morioka | JRL (Tohoku) | 0 | 0 | 0 | 0 | 0 | 0 |
| 2014 | Grulla Morioka | J3 League | 9 | 0 | 0 | 0 | 9 | 0 |
| 2015 | Grulla Morioka | J3 League | 18 | 0 | 1 | 0 | 19 | 0 |
| 2016 | Grulla Morioka | J3 League | 0 | 0 | – | | 0 | 0 |
| 2017 | ReinMeer Aomori | JFL | 6 | 0 | – | | 6 | 0 |
| 2018 | ReinMeer Aomori | JFL | 27 | 0 | 2 | 0 | 29 | 0 |
| 2019 | ReinMeer Aomori | JFL | 18 | 0 | – | | 18 | 0 |
| Career total | | | 78 | 0 | 3 | 0 | 81 | 0 |
