= Takahisa Nishiyama =

Japanese footballer

Takahisa Nishiyama 西山 貴永
Personal information
- Full name: Takahisa Nishiyama
- Date of birth: July 11, 1985 (age 41)
- Place of birth: Sendai, Miyagi, Japan
- Height: 1.64 m (5 ft 4 1/2 in)
- Position: Forward

Youth career
- 2001–2003: Sanfrecce Hiroshima

Senior career*
Years	Team	Apps	(Gls)
2004–2007	Kawasaki Frontale	6	(0)
2007	Yokohama FC	10	(0)
2008–2009	Vegalta Sendai	8	(0)
2010–2015	Fujieda MYFC	110	(23)
Total		134	(23)
Medal record
Kawasaki Frontale
Runner-up	J1 League	2006
Runner-up	J.League Cup	2007
- * Club domestic league appearances and goals

Takahisa Nishiyama (西山 貴永, Nishiyama Takahisa; born July 11, 1985) is a former Japanese football player.

== Career statistics ==
Appearances and goals by club, season and competition
Club	Season	League			Emperor's Cup		J.League Cup		Asia		Total	
Club	Season	Division	Apps	Goals	Apps	Goals	Apps	Goals	Apps	Goals	Apps	Goals
Kawasaki Frontale	2004	J2 League	0	0	0	0	—		—		0	0
Kawasaki Frontale	2005	J1 League	0	0	0	0	0	0	—		0	0
Kawasaki Frontale	2006	J1 League	3	0	0	0	2	0	—		5	0
Kawasaki Frontale	2007	J1 League	3	0	0	0	0	0	1	1	4	1
Yokohama FC	2007	J1 League	10	0	1	0	0	0	—		11	0
Vegalta Sendai	2008	J2 League	3	0	0	0	—		—		3	0
Vegalta Sendai	2009	J2 League	5	0	0	0	—		—		5	0
Fujieda MYFC	2010	Regional Leagues	15	7	—		—		—		15	7
Fujieda MYFC	2011	Regional Leagues	14	2	—		—		—		14	2
Fujieda MYFC	2012	Football League	28	7	—		—		—		28	7
Fujieda MYFC	2013	Football League	32	5	2	0	—		—		34	5
Fujieda MYFC	2014	J3 League	21	2	2	1	—		—		23	2
Fujieda MYFC	2015	J3 League	0	0	—		—		—		0	0
Career total			134	23	5	1	2	0	1	1	142	25
