= Sho Aota =

Japanese footballer

Personal information
- Full name: Sho Aota
- Date of birth: November 13, 1986 (age 40)
- Place of birth: Kanagawa, Japan
- Height: 1.66 m (5 ft 5 1/2 in)
- Position: Forward

Team information
- Current team: YSCC Yokohama
- Number: 11

Youth career
- 2005–2008: Kanto Gakuin University

Senior career*
Years	Team	Apps	(Gls)
2009–	YSCC Yokohama	104	(16)
- * Club domestic league appearances and goals as of December 31, 2015

Sho Aota (青田 翔, Aota Sho; born November 13, 1986 in Kanagawa) is a Japanese football player. He plays as a forward for YSCC Yokohama.

== Career statistics ==
Updated to 23 February 2016.

Appearances and goals by club, season and competition
Club	Season	League			Emperor's Cup		Total	
Club	Season	Division	Apps	Goals	Apps	Goals	Apps	Goals
YSCC Yokohama	2009	JRL (Kanto)	0	0	–		0	0
YSCC Yokohama	2010	JRL (Kanto)	3	1	1	0	4	1
YSCC Yokohama	2011	JRL (Kanto)	10	1	1	0	11	1
YSCC Yokohama	2012	JFL	24	9	2	0	26	9
YSCC Yokohama	2013	JFL	31	4	–		31	4
YSCC Yokohama	2014	J3 League	19	1	1	0	20	1
YSCC Yokohama	2015	J3 League	17	0	0	0	17	0
Career total			104	16	5	0	109	16
