= Ryuji Mochizuki =

Japanese footballer

Personal information
- Full name: Ryuji Mochizuki
- Date of birth: 6 September 1988 (age 38)
- Place of birth: Yaizu, Shizuoka, Japan
- Height: 1.77 m (5 ft 10 in)
- Position: Defender

Youth career
- 2007–2010: Fuji Tokoha University

Senior career*
| Years | Team | Apps | (Gls) |
| 2011–2016 | Fujieda MYFC | 78 | (4) |
- * Club domestic league appearances and goals as of 23 February 2017

Ryuji Mochizuki (望月 竜次, Mochizuki Ryūji; born 6 September 1988 in Yaizu, Shizuoka) is a former Japanese footballer who last played for Fujieda MYFC.

== Club statistics ==
Updated to 23 February 2017.

| Club performance | | | League | | Cup | | Total | |
| Season | Club | League | Apps | Goals | Apps | Goals | Apps | Goals |
| Japan | | | League | | Emperor's Cup | | Total | |
|---|---|---|---|---|---|---|---|---|
| 2011 | Fujieda MYFC | JRL (Tokai) | 13 | 2 | – | | 13 | 2 |
| 2012 | Fujieda MYFC | JFL | 13 | 2 | – | | 13 | 2 |
| 2013 | Fujieda MYFC | JFL | 4 | 0 | 0 | 0 | 4 | 0 |
| 2014 | Fujieda MYFC | J3 League | 25 | 0 | 2 | 0 | 27 | 0 |
| 2015 | Fujieda MYFC | J3 League | 25 | 0 | 3 | 0 | 28 | 0 |
| 2016 | Fujieda MYFC | J3 League | 0 | 0 | 0 | 0 | 0 | 0 |
| Career total | | | 78 | 4 | 5 | 0 | 83 | 4 |
