= Yohei Nishimura =

Japanese footballer

Yohei Nishimura 西村洋平
Personal information
- Full name: Yohei Nishimura
- Date of birth: June 1, 1993 (age 33)
- Place of birth: Kobe, Hyogo, Japan
- Height: 1.81 m (5 ft 11 1/2 in)
- Position: Defender

Team information
- Current team: Ococias Kyoto AC

College career
Years	Team	Apps	(Gls)
2012–2015	University of Tsukuba		

Senior career*
Years	Team	Apps	(Gls)
2016	Tochigi SC	4	(0)
2017–2018	Fujieda MYFC	20	(0)
2019–2020	Nara Club	15	(0)
2021–	Ococias Kyoto AC	29	(1)
- * Club domestic league appearances and goals as of 29 December 2018

Yohei Nishimura (西村 洋平, Nishimura Yōhei; born June 1, 1993) is a Japanese footballer who plays as a defender for Ococias Kyoto AC.

== Club statistics ==
Updated to 16 April 2023.

Club performance			League		Cup		Total	
Season	Club	League	Apps	Goals	Apps	Goals	Apps	Goals
Japan			League		Emperor's Cup		Total	
2016	Tochigi SC	J3 League	4	0	0	0	4	0
2017	Fujieda MYFC	J3 League	16	0	–		16	0
2018	Fujieda MYFC	J3 League	4	0	–		4	0
2019	Nara Club	JFL	4	0	–		4	0
2020	Nara Club	JFL	11	0	–		11	0
2021	Ococias Kyoto AC	KSL	13	0	–		13	0
2022	Ococias Kyoto AC	KSL	14	0	–		14	0
2023	Ococias Kyoto AC	KSL	2	0	–		13	0
Total			68	0	0	0	68	0
