= Mitsuru Mansho =

Japanese footballer

Personal information
- Date of birth: April 16, 1989 (age 37)
- Place of birth: Osaka, Japan
- Height: 1.75 m (5 ft 9 in)
- Positions: Striker; centre-back

Youth career
- 2005–2007: Osaka Toin High School
- 2010–2013: Osaka Sangyo University

Senior career*
Years	Team	Apps	(Gls)
2008–2009	Mito HollyHock	7	(0)
2014–2016	Fujieda MYFC	45	(4)
- * Club domestic league appearances and goals as of 23 February 2017

Mitsuru Mansho (満生 充, Mansho Mitsuru; born April 16, 1989 in Osaka) is a former Japanese football player who last played as a striker for J3 League side Fujieda MYFC.

== Club statistics ==
Updated to 23 February 2017.

Club performance			League		Cup		Total	
Season	Club	League	Apps	Goals	Apps	Goals	Apps	Goals
Japan			League		Emperor's Cup		Total	
2008	Mito HollyHock	J2 League	7	0	0	0	7	0
2009	Mito HollyHock	J2 League	0	0	0	0	0	0
2014	Fujieda MYFC	J3 League	20	1	2	0	22	1
2015	Fujieda MYFC	J3 League	25	3	3	0	28	3
2016	Fujieda MYFC	J3 League	1	0	0	0	1	0
Total			53	4	5	0	58	4
