= Kenta Matsuda =

Japanese footballer (born 1984)

Personal information
- Full name: Kenta Matsuda
- Date of birth: 22 August 1984 (age 42)
- Place of birth: Ōfunato, Iwate, Japan
- Height: 1.77 m (5 ft 9 1/2 in)
- Position: Midfielder

Youth career
- 2003–2006: Hachinohe Gakuin University

Senior career*
Years	Team	Apps	(Gls)
2007–2016	Grulla Morioka	156	(34)
- * Club domestic league appearances and goals as of 23 February 2017

Kenta Matsuda (松田賢太, Matsuda Kenta; born 22 August 1984) is a former Japanese footballer who last played and captained Grulla Morioka.

== Career ==
After a decade spent with Grulla Morioka, Matsuda opted to retire after playing one game in the whole 2016 season. He's now still part of the club, helping Grulla and the region of Iwate getting known in Japan.

== Career statistics ==
Updated to 23 February 2017.

Club performance			League		Cup		Total	
Season	Club	League	Apps	Goals	Apps	Goals	Apps	Goals
Japan			League		Emperor's Cup		Total	
2007	Grulla Morioka	JRL (Tohoku, Div. 1)	12	7	-		12	7
2008	Grulla Morioka	JRL (Tohoku, Div. 1)	13	2	2	1	15	3
2009	Grulla Morioka	JRL (Tohoku, Div. 1)	14	5	1	0	15	5
2010	Grulla Morioka	JRL (Tohoku, Div. 1)	14	7	2	0	16	7
2011	Grulla Morioka	JRL (Tohoku, Div. 1)	11	4	1	0	12	4
2012	Grulla Morioka	JRL (Tohoku, Div. 1)	12	1	1	0	13	1
2013	Grulla Morioka	JRL (Tohoku, Div. 1)	15	2	1	0	16	2
2014	Grulla Morioka	J3 League	29	1	1	0	30	1
2015	Grulla Morioka	J3 League	35	5	1	0	36	5
2016	Grulla Morioka	J3 League	1	0	0	0	1	0
Career total			156	34	10	1	166	35
