= Takao Nishiyama =

Japanese footballer

Takao Nishiyama 西山 孝朗
Personal information
- Full name: Takao Nishiyama
- Date of birth: January 7, 1942 (age 84)
- Place of birth: Empire of Japan
- Position: Defender

Youth career
- 1957–1959: Atsuta High School
- 1960–1963: Waseda University

Senior career*
| Years | Team | Apps | (Gls) |
| 1964–???? | Toyoda Automatic Loom Works | | |

International career
| 1964 | Japan | 1 | (0) |
- * Club domestic league appearances and goals

Takao Nishiyama (西山 孝朗, Nishiyama Takao; born January 7, 1942) is a former Japanese football player. He played for Japan national team.

== Club career ==
Nishiyama was born on January 7, 1942. After graduating from Waseda University, he joined Toyoda Automatic Loom Works in 1964.

== National team career ==
On March 3, 1964, when Nishiyama was a Waseda University student, he debuted for Japan national team against Singapore.

== National team statistics ==
Japan national team
| Year | Apps | Goals |
|---|---|---|
| 1964 | 1 | 0 |
| Total | 1 | 0 |
