= Kengo Kotani =

Japanese footballer

Kengo Kotani 小谷 健悟
Personal information
- Full name: Kengo Kotani
- Date of birth: August 31, 1992 (age 34)
- Place of birth: Hioki, Kagoshima, Japan
- Height: 1.70 m (5 ft 7 in)
- Position: Midfielder

Team information
- Current team: FC Tiamo Hirakata
- Number: 29

Youth career
- 2011–2014: National Institute of Fitness and Sports in Kanoya

Senior career*
Years	Team	Apps	(Gls)
2015–2018	Giravanz Kitakyushu	21	(3)
2019–	FC Tiamo Hirakata	5	(0)
- * Club domestic league appearances and goals as of 23 February 2020

Kengo Kotani (小谷 健悟, Kotani Kengo; born August 31, 1992 in Hioki, Kagoshima) is a Japanese football player for FC Tiamo Hirakata.

== Club statistics ==
Updated to 23 February 2018.

Club performance			League		Cup		Total	
Season	Club	League	Apps	Goals	Apps	Goals	Apps	Goals
Japan			League		Emperor's Cup		Total	
2015	Giravanz Kitakyushu	J2 League	3	0	0	0	3	0
2016	Giravanz Kitakyushu	J2 League	7	0	0	0	7	0
2017	Giravanz Kitakyushu	J3 League	11	3	2	0	13	3
2018	Giravanz Kitakyushu	J3 League	0	0	0	0	0	0
2019	FC Tiamo Hirakata	JRL (Kansai, Div. 1)	5	0	–		5	0
Career total			26	3	2	0	28	3
