= Keita Tanaka =

Japanese footballer

Keita Tanaka 田中 恵太
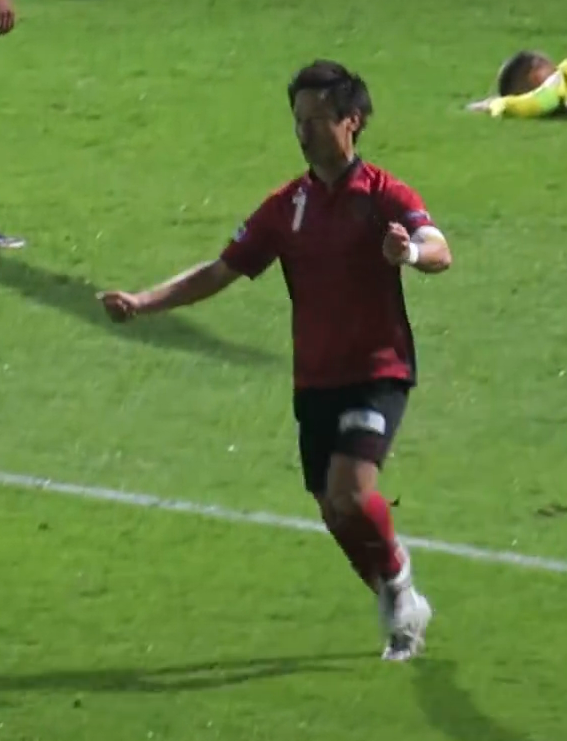

Personal information
- Full name: Keita Tanaka
- Date of birth: December 26, 1989 (age 36)
- Place of birth: Tokyo, Japan
- Height: 1.69 m (5 ft 6 1/2 in)
- Position: Midfielder

Team information
- Current team: FC Osaka
- Number: 16

Youth career
- –2001: Kaishin Daiyon Elementary School
- 2002–2007: Mitsubishi Yowa

College career
Years	Team	Apps	(Gls)
2008–2011	Meiji University		

Senior career*
Years	Team	Apps	(Gls)
2012–2014	AC Nagano Parceiro	56	(7)
2015–2016	FC Ryukyu	58	(22)
2017–2018	Mito HollyHock	17	(2)
2017	→ FC Ryukyu (loan)	16	(7)
2019–2022	FC Ryukyu	99	(5)
2023-2025	Gainare Tottori	80	(5)
2026-	FC Osaka	1	(0)
- * Club domestic league appearances and goals as of 18 August 2026

Keita Tanaka (田中 恵太, Tanaka Keita; born December 26, 1989) is a Japanese football player for FC Osaka. He is also a YouTuber, running the channel 独身Jリーガーの日常 (Daily Life of an Unmarried J-Leaguer), where he vlogs his life and career.

== Career ==
After four years in Meiji University's soccer team, Tanaka signed for Nagano Parceiro. Three years with the Northern-side brought Tanaka to FC Ryūkyū, where he inherited the captain's armband in 2016 after renewing his contract.

== Club statistics ==
Updated to end of 2018 season.

Club performance			League		Cup		Total	
Season	Club	League	Apps	Goals	Apps	Goals	Apps	Goals
Japan			League		Emperor's Cup		Total	
2012	Nagano Parceiro	JFL	16	1	1	0	17	1
2013	Nagano Parceiro	JFL	26	6	4	0	30	6
2014	Nagano Parceiro	J3 League	14	0	0	0	14	0
2015	FC Ryukyu	J3 League	29	9	2	3	31	12
2016	FC Ryukyu	J3 League	29	13	2	1	31	14
2017	Mito HollyHock	J2 League	4	0	1	0	5	0
2017	FC Ryukyu	J3 League	16	7	0	0	16	7
2018	Mito HollyHock	J2 League	13	2	2	0	15	2
Total			147	38	12	4	159	42
