= Yuta Kutsukake =

Japanese footballer

Yuta Kutsukake 沓掛 勇太
Personal information
- Full name: Yuta Kutsukake
- Date of birth: November 12, 1991 (age 34)
- Place of birth: Tokyo, Japan
- Height: 1.80 m (5 ft 11 in)
- Position: Midfielder

Youth career
- 2007–2009: JEF United Chiba Youth
- 2010–2013: Kwansei Gakuin University

Senior career*
Years	Team	Apps	(Gls)
2014–2015	Fujieda MYFC	57	(2)
2016–2018	Azul Claro Numazu	63	(4)
- * Club domestic league appearances and goals as of 23 February 2019

Yuta Kutsukake (沓掛 勇太, Kutsukake Yūta; born November 12, 1991) is a former Japanese football player, who last featured for Azul Claro Numazu.

== Playing career ==
Yuta Kutsukake played for J3 League club; Fujieda MYFC from 2014 to 2015. In 2016, he moved to Azul Claro Numazu. He opted to retire in January 2019.

== Club statistics ==
Updated to 23 February 2019.

Club performance			League		Cup		Total	
Season	Club	League	Apps	Goals	Apps	Goals	Apps	Goals
Japan			League		Emperor's Cup		Total	
2014	Fujieda MYFC	J3 League	23	1	2	0	25	1
2015	Fujieda MYFC	J3 League	34	1	2	0	36	1
2016	Azul Claro Numazu	JFL	29	1	–		29	1
2017	Azul Claro Numazu	J3 League	23	3	1	0	24	3
2018	Azul Claro Numazu	J3 League	11	0	–		11	0
Total			120	6	5	0	125	6
