= Hajime Eto =

Japanese footballer and manager

Hajime Eto 衛藤 元
Personal information
- Full name: Hajime Eto
- Date of birth: April 21, 1973 (age 53)
- Place of birth: Kyoto, Japan

Managerial career
- Years: Team
- 2006–2008: Shiga FC
- 2015: AC Nagano Parceiro

Hajime Eto (衛藤 元, Etō Hajime; born April 21, 1973) is a former Japanese football player and manager.

== Coaching career ==
Eto was born in Kyoto Prefecture on April 21, 1973. After he was assumed in 2015 into the J3 League club; and as head coach of AC Nagano Parceiro, he became the manager in August 2015 in place of Naohiko Minobe. After failing to gain a promotion with the squad in the J3 League, he signed with Thespakusatsu Gunma to become one of their coaches in 2016. He left Thespakusatsu at the end of the 2016 season.

== Managerial statistics ==
Team	From	To	Record				
Team	From	To	G	W	D	L	Win %
AC Nagano Parceiro	2015	2015	14	8	4	2	57.14
Total			14	8	4	2	57.14
