= Hiroki Narabayashi =

Japanese footballer

Personal information
- Full name: Hiroki Narabayashi
- Date of birth: 14 January 1988 (age 38)
- Place of birth: Kurashiki, Okayama, Japan
- Height: 1.73 m (5 ft 8 in)
- Position: Defender

Youth career
- 2006–2009: Aoyama Gakuin University

Senior career*
Years	Team	Apps	(Gls)
2010–2016	Fujieda MYFC	147	(11)
- * Club domestic league appearances and goals as of 23 February 2017

Hiroki Narabayashi (奈良林寛紀, born 14 January 1988) is a former Japanese football player who last played for and captains Fujieda MYFC.

== Club statistics ==
Updated to 23 February 2017.

Club performance			League		Cup		Total	
Season	Club	League	Apps	Goals	Apps	Goals	Apps	Goals
Japan			League		Emperor's Cup		Total	
2010	Fujieda MYFC	JRL (Tokai, Div. 1)	15	2	-		15	2
2011	Fujieda MYFC	JRL (Tokai, Div. 1)	14	5	-		14	5
2012	Fujieda MYFC	JFL	30	2	-		30	2
2013	Fujieda MYFC	JFL	31	2	0	0	31	2
2014	Fujieda MYFC	J3 League	23	0	0	0	23	0
2015	Fujieda MYFC	J3 League	32	0	3	0	35	0
2016	Fujieda MYFC	J3 League	2	0	0	0	2	0
Total			147	11	3	0	150	11
