= Daiki Umei =

Japanese footballer

Personal information
- Full name: Daiki Umei
- Date of birth: 5 October 1989 (age 37)
- Place of birth: Fukui, Fukui, Japan
- Height: 1.92 m (6 ft 3 1/2 in)
- Position: Defender

Team information
- Current team: SC Sagamihara
- Number: 5

Youth career
- 2005–2007: Maruoka High School

Senior career*
| Years | Team | Apps | (Gls) |
| 2008–2009 | Yokohama F. Marinos | 0 | (0) |
| 2010 | Thespa Kusatsu | 5 | (0) |
| 2011 | Oita Trinita | 0 | (0) |
| 2012 | Zweigen Kanazawa | 5 | (0) |
| 2013–2015 | Saurcos Fukui | 39 | (10) |
| 2016 | Fukushima United FC | 19 | (1) |
| 2017– | SC Sagamihara | | |

International career
| 2006–2007 | Japan U18 | 4 | (0) |
- * Club domestic league appearances and goals as of 23 February 2017

Daiki Umei (梅井 大輝, Umei Daiki; born October 5, 1989) is a Japanese football player for SC Sagamihara.

== Club statistics ==
Updated to 23 February 2017.

| Club performance | | | League | | Cup | | League Cup | | Total | |
| Season | Club | League | Apps | Goals | Apps | Goals | Apps | Goals | Apps | Goals |
| Japan | | | League | | Emperor's Cup | | League Cup | | Total | |
|---|---|---|---|---|---|---|---|---|---|---|
| 2008 | Yokohama F. Marinos | J1 League | 0 | 0 | 0 | 0 | 0 | 0 | 0 | 0 |
| 2009 | Yokohama F. Marinos | J1 League | 0 | 0 | 1 | 0 | 0 | 0 | 1 | 0 |
| 2010 | Thespa Kusatsu | J2 League | 5 | 0 | 0 | 0 | – | | 5 | 0 |
| 2011 | Oita Trinita | J2 League | 0 | 0 | 0 | 0 | – | | 0 | 0 |
| 2012 | Zweigen Kanazawa | JFL | 5 | 0 | 0 | 0 | – | | 5 | 0 |
| 2013 | Saurcos Fukui | JRL (Hokushinetsu, Div. 1) | 12 | 1 | 2 | 0 | – | | 14 | 1 |
| 2014 | Saurcos Fukui | JRL (Hokushinetsu, Div. 1) | 13 | 5 | 2 | 0 | – | | 15 | 5 |
| 2015 | Saurcos Fukui | JRL (Hokushinetsu, Div. 1) | 14 | 4 | 1 | 0 | – | | 15 | 4 |
| 2016 | Fukushima United FC | J3 League | 19 | 1 | 0 | 0 | – | | 19 | 1 |
| Career total | | | 68 | 11 | 6 | 0 | 0 | 0 | 74 | 11 |
