= Takuya Mihashi =

Japanese footballer

Personal information
- Full name: Takuya Mihashi
- Date of birth: March 6, 1992 (age 34)
- Place of birth: Osaka, Japan
- Height: 1.77 m (5 ft 9 1/2 in)
- Position: Midfielder

Youth career
- 2011–2014: Biwako Seikei Sport College

Senior career*
Years	Team	Apps	(Gls)
2015–	Fujieda MYFC	24	(0)
- * Club domestic league appearances and goals as of 23 February 2016

Takuya Mihashi (三橋 拓也, Mihashi Takuya; born March 6, 1992, in Osaka) is a Japanese football player.

== Club statistics ==
Updated to 23 February 2016.

Club performance			League		Cup		Total	
Season	Club	League	Apps	Goals	Apps	Goals	Apps	Goals
Japan			League		Emperor's Cup		Total	
2015	Fujieda MYFC	J3 League	24	0	0	0	24	0
Career total			24	0	0	0	24	0
