= Jae Won Lee =

American sculptor

Jae Won Lee is a Korean American ceramic artist living and working in Michigan in the United States. She received her Master of Fine Arts from the New York State College of Ceramics at Alfred University in 1995 and is currently an associate professor at Michigan State University in East Lansing, where she teaches Foundation Courses and Senior Seminar. She hand-builds porcelain and uses other materials such as paper and hair. Much of Lee's work is derived from an isolation that is created by her trans-cultural identity of both Korea and the United States.

Lee's works serve as a means to express and internally reconcile her two dichotomous cultural worlds. Being Korean, but living in the US, she finds that neither place is her home. Lee says that her “…sense of ‘home’ is a spectrum of emotions...of yearning for belonging, wholeness, and rootedness.” The possibility that these two worlds might coexist is embedded deeply in her work. To her, “...art is a reflection of the human experience.”

Lee’s work is meditative in both the ways it is made and conceived. Her journal is an essential part of her creative process. For her, writing is a solitary act of contemplation that distills her ideas to the most essential forms. The same applies in her studio life; working is a solitary act. The obsessive nature of her work, especially with making multiples, creates a meditative space that is vital in her work. The effect is forms like hundreds of bundles of tiny needles--like porcelain coils or a row of wafer-thin porcelain discs. Her forms are reduced to the “ultimate necessities” and hark back to minimalist and formalist work. The reductive nature of her work makes important every undulation, the subtle variation, and the “slightest twitch in the nervous system."

== Bibliography ==
- Craig, Gerry, Intangible Landscape Sculpture v 25 (January/February 2006) 50–51
- Jae Won Lee, Jae Won Lee The Studio Potter v 34(December 2005) 15–17
- Lee, J W [Jane Hartsook Gallery, Greenwich House Pottery, New Your; exhibit]. Ceramics Monthly v 45 (March 1997) 22
