= Kazushi Uchida =

Japanese footballer

Personal information
- Full name: Kazushi Uchida
- Date of birth: October 9, 1987 (age 39)
- Place of birth: Shizuoka, Japan
- Height: 1.81 m (5 ft 11 1/2 in)
- Position: Defender

Youth career
- 2003–2005: Tokoha Gakuen Tachibana High School

College career
Years	Team	Apps	(Gls)
2006–2009	Takushoku University		

Senior career*
Years	Team	Apps	(Gls)
2010–2015	Fujieda MYFC	86	(5)
Total		86	(5)
- * Club domestic league appearances and goals

Kazushi Uchida (内田 和志, Uchida Kazushi; born October 9, 1987) is a former Japanese football player.

== Playing career ==
Kazushi Uchida played for Fujieda MYFC from 2010 to 2015.
