= Jumpei Arai =

Japanese footballer

Jumpei Arai 新井純平
Personal information
- Full name: Jumpei Arai
- Date of birth: 22 July 1989 (age 37)
- Place of birth: Yachiyo, Ibaraki, Japan
- Height: 1.71 m (5 ft 7 in)
- Position: Midfielder

Youth career
- 2009–2012: Nippon Sport Science University

Senior career*
Years	Team	Apps	(Gls)
2013–2016	Giravanz Kitakyushu	53	(0)
2017–2019	Nagano Parceiro	49	(2)
- * Club domestic league appearances and goals as of 23 December 2019

Jumpei Arai (新井純平, Arai Jumpei; born 22 July 1989) is a former Japanese former footballer.

== Career ==
Arai retired in December 2019, citing issues with a recurring knee injury.

== Club statistics ==
Updated to 23 February 2020.

Club performance			League		Cup		Total	
Season	Club	League	Apps	Goals	Apps	Goals	Apps	Goals
Japan			League		Emperor's Cup		Total	
2013	Giravanz Kitakyushu	J2 League	25	0	2	0	27	0
2014	Giravanz Kitakyushu	J2 League	3	0	0	0	3	0
2015	Giravanz Kitakyushu	J2 League	2	0	1	0	3	0
2016	Giravanz Kitakyushu	J2 League	23	0	2	0	25	0
2017	Nagano Parceiro	J3 League	30	0	1	0	31	0
2018	Nagano Parceiro	J3 League	0	0	0	0	0	0
2019	Nagano Parceiro	J3 League	19	2	0	0	19	2
Career total			102	2	6	0	108	2
