= Keita Ichikawa =

Japanese footballer

Keita Ichikawa 市川恵多
Personal information
- Full name: Keita Ichikawa
- Date of birth: 3 October 1990 (age 36)
- Place of birth: Maebashi, Japan
- Height: 1.80 m (5 ft 11 in)
- Position: Defender

Youth career
- 2009–2012: Toyo University

Senior career*
Years	Team	Apps	(Gls)
2013–2016	Giravanz Kitakyushu	26	(0)
2017–2018	Thespakusatsu Gunma	20	(0)
- * Club domestic league appearances and goals as of 23 February 2018

Keita Ichikawa (市川恵多, Ichikawa Keita; born 3 October 1990 in Maebashi) is a Japanese footballer.

== Club statistics ==
Updated to 23 February 2018.

Appearances and goals by club, season and competition
Club	Season	League			Emperor's Cup		Total	
Club	Season	Division	Apps	Goals	Apps	Goals	Apps	Goals
Giravanz Kitakyushu	2013	J2 League	4	0	2	0	6	0
Giravanz Kitakyushu	2014	J2 League	4	0	0	0	4	0
Giravanz Kitakyushu	2015	J2 League	5	0	1	0	6	0
Giravanz Kitakyushu	2016	J2 League	13	0	0	0	13	0
Thespakusatsu Gunma	2017	J2 League	8	0	1	0	9	0
Career total			34	0	4	0	38	0
