= Ayaki Suzuki =

Japanese footballer (born 1987)

Ayaki Suzuki 鈴木彩貴
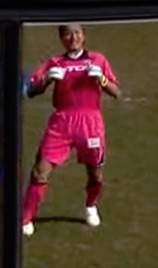

Personal information
- Full name: Ayaki Suzuki
- Date of birth: 13 April 1987 (age 39)
- Place of birth: Aichi, Japan
- Height: 1.84 m (6 ft 0 in)
- Position: Goalkeeper

Youth career
- 2006–2009: Ritsumeikan University

Senior career*
Years	Team	Apps	(Gls)
2010–2013	Blaublitz Akita	85	(0)
2014–2016	Giravanz Kitakyushu	37	(0)
2017–2018	Yokohama F. Marinos	0	(0)
2019	V-Varen Nagasaki	0	(0)
Medal record
Yokohama F. Marinos
Runner-up	J.League Cup	2018
Runner-up	Emperor's Cup	2017
- * Club domestic league appearances and goals as of 20 December 2019

Ayaki Suzuki (鈴木彩貴, Suzuki Ayaki; born 13 April 1987 in Aichi) is a Japanese retired footballer.

== Career ==
Suzuki represented Blaublitz Akita, Giravanz Kitakyushu, Yokohama F. Marinos and V-Varen Nagasaki. He retired in December 2019.

== Career statistics ==
Updated to 2 December 2018.

Appearances and goals by club, season and competition
Club	Season	League			Emperor's Cup		J.League Cup		Total	
Club	Season	Division	Apps	Goals	Apps	Goals	Apps	Goals	Apps	Goals
Blaublitz Akita	2010	JFL	6	0	0	0	—		6	0
Blaublitz Akita	2011	JFL	22	0	2	0	—		24	0
Blaublitz Akita	2012	JFL	32	0	2	0	—		34	0
Blaublitz Akita	2013	JFL	25	0	2	0	—		27	0
Giravanz Kitakyushu	2014	J2 League	0	0	0	0	—		0	0
Giravanz Kitakyushu	2015	J2 League	19	0	0	0	—		19	0
Giravanz Kitakyushu	2016	J2 League	18	0	0	0	—		18	0
Yokohama F. Marinos	2017	J1 League	0	0	0	0	0	0	0	0
Yokohama F. Marinos	2018	J1 League	0	0	0	0	0	0	0	0
Career total			122	0	6	0	0	0	128	0
