= Akihiko Kamikawa =

Japanese footballer

Akihiko Kamikawa 神川 明彦
Personal information
- Full name: Akihiko Kamikawa
- Date of birth: July 9, 1966 (age 60)
- Place of birth: Kanagawa, Japan

Youth career
- Years: Team
- 1982–1984: Kamakura High School
- 1985–1988: Meiji University

Managerial career
- 2016: Grulla Morioka

Akihiko Kamikawa (神川 明彦, Kamikawa Akihiko; born July 9, 1966) is a former Japanese football player and manager.

== Coaching career ==
Kamikawa was born in Kanagawa Prefecture on July 9, 1966. In 1994, he started coaching career at alma mater Meiji University. He coached until 2013. In 2016, he became a manager for J3 League club Grulla Morioka. Grulla finished at the 13th place of 16 clubs and he resigned end of 2016 season.

== Managerial statistics ==
Team	From	To	Record				
Team	From	To	G	W	D	L	Win %
Grulla Morioka	2016	2016	30	6	12	12	20.00
Total			30	6	12	12	20.00
