= Lee Jae-won (footballer, born 1992) =

South Korean footballer

Personal information
- Full name: Lee Jae-won
- Date of birth: June 2, 1992 (age 34)
- Place of birth: South Korea
- Height: 1.91 m (6 ft 3 in)
- Position: Forward

Senior career*
Years	Team	Apps	(Gls)
2015	Kataller Toyama	3	(0)
- * Club domestic league appearances and goals as of December 31, 2015

Lee Jae-won (born June 2, 1992) is a South Korean football player.

== Playing career ==
Lee Jae-won played for J3 League club; Kataller Toyama in 2015 season.
