= 2015 J3 League =

Meiji Yasuda J3 League
- Season: 2015
- Champions: Renofa Yamaguchi
- Promoted: Renofa Yamaguchi Machida Zelvia
- Matches: 234
- Goals: 586 (2.5 per match)
- Top goalscorer: Kazuhito Kishida (32 goals)
- Highest attendance: 9,040 (Sagamihara vs YSCC Yokohama, 25 October)
- Lowest attendance: 461 (YSCC Yokohama vs Tottori, 13 November)
- Average attendance: 2,432

The 2015 Meiji Yasuda J3 League (2015 明治安田生命J3リーグ) was the 19th season of the third tier in Japanese football, and the 2nd season of the professional J3 League.

== Clubs ==
Locations of the 2015 J3 League teams

To participate, a club must have held an associate membership, or have submitted an application before 30 June 2014, and then passed an inspection to obtain a participation license issued by J.League Council. J.League has confirmed the following clubs participating in the 2015 J3 season:

Club name	Home town	Notes
Blaublitz Akita	All cities/towns in Akita	
Fukushima United	Fukushima	
Gainare Tottori	All cities/towns in Tottori	Withdrew a J2 license due to financial reasons.
Grulla Morioka	Morioka, Iwate	
Kataller Toyama	All cities/towns in Toyama	Relegated from 2014 J2, eligible for J2 promotion
Fujieda MYFC	Fujieda, Shizuoka	
Nagano Parceiro	Nagano	Eligible for J2 promotion
FC Ryukyu	All cities/towns in Okinawa	
SC Sagamihara	Sagamihara, Kanagawa	
YSCC Yokohama	Yokohama, Kanagawa	
Machida Zelvia	Machida, Tokyo	Eligible for J2 promotion
Renofa Yamaguchi	Yamaguchi	Promoted from 2014 JFL, eligible for J2 promotion
J.League U-22 Selection	n/a	A special team, composed of best J1 and J2 youngsters to prepare them for the 2016 Olympics. Folded by the JFA after the season.

== Competition rules ==
The league is played in three rounds, each team playing a total of 36 matches. J.League U-22 Selection played all their matches on the road.

Each team must have at least 3 players holding professional contracts. Two foreign players are allowed per team, plus 1 more from the ASEAN partner country of J. League. The matchday roster will consist of 16 players, and up to 5 substitutes will be allowed in a game.

=== Promotion and relegation ===
Rules for promotion to J2 are largely similar to those of Japan Football League in the recent seasons: to be promoted, a club must hold a J2 license and finish in top 2 of the league. The U-22 team is not eligible for promotion regardless of their final position. The champions will be promoted directly, in exchange with 22nd-placed J2 club, and the runners-up will participate in the playoffs with 21st J2 club. If either or both top 2 finishers are ineligible for promotion, the playoffs and/or direct exchange will not be held in accordance to the exact positions of promotion-eligible clubs.

No relegation to JFL is planned. Up to 2 clubs may be promoted if they are licensed by J. League for J3 participation and finish in top 4 of JFL.

=== Personnel and kits ===
Note: Flags indicate national team as has been defined under FIFA eligibility rules. Players may hold more than one non-FIFA nationality.

Team	Manager^{1}	Captain	Kit manufacturer	Shirt sponsor
Blaublitz Akita	Shuichi Mase	Toshio Shimakawa	Athleta	TDK
Fukushima United	Keisuke Kurihara	Kazuto Ishido	Hummel	TOHO BANK
Gainare Tottori	Masanobu Matsunami	Ryosuke Kawanabe	Hummel	Tottori Gas Co.
Grulla Morioka	Naoki Naruo	Kenta Matsuda	SVOLME	PalcoHome
Kataller Toyama	Yasuyuki Kishino	Taijiro Mori	Goldwin	YKK
Fujieda MYFC	Atsuto Oishi	Hiroki Narabayashi	Razzoli	Chang
Nagano Parceiro	Naohiko Minobe	Yuji Unozawa	DUELO	Hokto
Renofa Yamaguchi	Nobuhiro Ueno	Kiyohiro Hirabayashi	FINTA	upr
FC Ryukyu	Norihiro Satsukawa	Satoshi Nakayama	mitre	GOO
SC Sagamihara	Keiju Karashima	Naohiro Takahara	gol.	Gion
YSCC Yokohama	Kenji Arima	Akio Yoshida	SVOLME	Kaspersky
Machida Zelvia	Naoki Soma	Ri Han-jae	SVOLME	Eagle Kenso
J.League U-22 Selection	Tsutomu Takahata	Various	Adidas	None

=== Managerial changes ===
Team	Outgoing manager	Date of separation	Manner of departure	Incoming manager	Date of announcement
Nagano Parceiro	(Japan) Naohiko Minobe	5 August	Resigned on health issues	(Japan) Hajime Eto	5 August
Kataller Toyama	(Japan) Yasuyuki Kishino	27 August	Mutual consent	(Japan) Shigeo Sawairi (acting)	27 August
SC Sagamihara	(Japan) Keiju Karashima	2 November	Resigned	(Japan) Yoshika Matsubara	2 November

== Foreign players ==
Club	Player 1	Player 2	Player 3	Asian player	Non-visa foreign	Type-C contract
Blaublitz Akita	(Chile) Agustin Ortega	(Brazil) Leonardo				
Fukushima United	(South Korea) Kim Kong Chyong	(North Korea) Kim Hong-yeon				
Gainare Tottori	(Brazil) Fernandinho					
Grulla Morioka	(South Korea) Jung Hoon-sung					
Kataller Toyama	(Malaysia) Tam Sheang Tsung	(South Korea) Lee Jae-won				
Fujieda MYFC	(South Korea) Park Iru-gyu					
Nagano Parceiro	(South Korea) Kim Yeong-gi	(South Korea) Ko Kyung-dae	(Timor-Leste) Murilo			
Renofa Yamaguchi	(South Korea) Kim Jeong-seok	(South Korea) Choi Ju-yong				
FC Ryukyu	(Burkina Faso) Mac	(South Korea) Park Riki				
SC Sagamihara	(Brazil) Leozinho	(Brazil) Toró	(United States) Mobi Fehr			
YSCC Yokohama	None					
Machida Zelvia	(South Korea) Bae Dae-won	(North Korea) Ri Han-jae	(South Korea) Lee Min-soo			
J.League U-22 Selection^{1}	N/A					

Note:

^1 A special team, composed of best J1 and J2 youngsters to prepare them for the 2016 Olympics

== League table ==
Pos	Team	Pld	W	D	L	GF	GA	GD	Pts	Promotion or relegation
1	Renofa Yamaguchi (C, P)	36	25	3	8	96	36	+60	78	Promotion to 2016 J2 League
2	Machida Zelvia (P)	36	23	9	4	52	18	+34	78	Qualification to J2 League promotion playoffs (Note: Only teams that hold a J2 license are eligible for promotion.)
3	Nagano Parceiro	36	21	7	8	46	28	+18	70	
4	SC Sagamihara	36	17	7	12	59	51	+8	58	
5	Kataller Toyama	36	14	10	12	37	36	+1	52	
6	Gainare Tottori	36	14	8	14	47	41	+6	50	
7	Fukushima United	36	13	10	13	42	48	−6	49	
8	Blaublitz Akita	36	12	9	15	37	40	−3	45	
9	FC Ryukyu	36	12	9	15	45	51	−6	45	
10	Fujieda MYFC	36	11	4	21	37	61	−24	37	
11	Grulla Morioka	36	8	11	17	36	47	−11	35	
12	J.League U-22 Selection (W)	36	7	7	22	28	71	−43	28	Folded by JFA after the season.
13	YSCC Yokohama	36	7	6	23	24	58	−34	27	

Updated to match(es) played on 23 November 2015. Source: JLeague.jp
Rules for classification: 1) Points; 2) Goal difference; 3) Goals scored; 4th) head-to-head results; 5th) disciplinary points; 6th) draw
(C) Champions; (P) Promoted; (W) Withdrawn

== Results ==
=== Rounds 1–13 ===
Home \ Away	BLA	FUK	GAI	GRU	KAT	MYF	PAR	REN	RYU	SGM	YSC	ZEL	J22
Blaublitz Akita			1–2	1–0				1–2		3–0	0–1		1–0
Fukushima United	1–1			1–0		0–2	1–2	3–4					1–4
Gainare Tottori		1–2			2–1	2–0	0–1		1–0		1–1		2–0
Grulla Morioka			0–1		0–0	2–0	0–2				2–2	0–0	1–2
Kataller Toyama	1–0	1–2				1–0				0–1	2–0	1–2	2–1
Fujieda MYFC	0–2						0–1		0–0	0–2		1–1	1–1
Nagano Parceiro	1–0				0–1			2–1	2–1	1–2			2–0
Renofa Yamaguchi			2–1	4–0	1–0	3–0			4–3	2–0			8–0
FC Ryukyu	2–0	1–1		3–1	0–0						0–1		2–1
SC Sagamihara		2–0	0–2	1–1					0–1			2–1	3–0
YSCC Yokohama		0–1				0–1	0–2	0–1		0–4		0–1	0–0
Machida Zelvia	0–1	1–1	2–0				0–0	1–0	1–0				6–0
J.League U-22													

Updated to match(es) played on 24 May 2015. Source: J. League data
Legend: Blue = home team win; Yellow = draw; Red = away team win.

=== Rounds 14–26 ===
Home \ Away	BLA	FUK	GAI	GRU	KAT	MYF	PAR	REN	RYU	SGM	YSC	ZEL	J22
Blaublitz Akita		2–3	1–2		1–1	0–0	1–2					0–1	0–0
Fukushima United			1–0	1–1	0–3					1–1		1–1	1–1
Gainare Tottori				2–1	1–2	2–1		1–1				0–0	1–1
Grulla Morioka	0–0					0–2		0–1	2–1	2–3	1–1		5–0
Kataller Toyama				1–0				2–5	0–1	0–0	1–1		0–0
Fujieda MYFC		3–0			1–4		2–1	0–4	0–1				2–0
Nagano Parceiro		1–0	2–0	0–1	1–0					0–0	1–0		0–1
Renofa Yamaguchi	3–1	3–0					3–2		5–0		6–1	1–2	3–0
FC Ryukyu	2–1	1–2	2–1				1–1				2–1		2–1
SC Sagamihara	3–1		2–1			5–0		0–3	1–1			0–1	1–2
YSCC Yokohama	0–0	0–1	1–0			1–2				0–1			0–3
Machida Zelvia				0–1	1–0	4–0	2–0		2–0		2–1		3–1
J.League U-22													

Updated to match(es) played on 16 August 2015. Source: J. League data
Legend: Blue = home team win; Yellow = draw; Red = away team win.

=== Rounds 27–39 ===
Home \ Away	BLA	FUK	GAI	GRU	KAT	MYF	PAR	REN	RYU	SGM	YSC	ZEL	J22
Blaublitz Akita							1–1	3–1	3–3	2–2	1–0		1–0
Fukushima United	1–2					2–1	0–1	2–1	1–1		3–0		3–0
Gainare Tottori	0–1	1–1						2–2	3–0	6–2		1–1	0–1
Grulla Morioka	0–1	3–1	1–2					1–4				1–1	1–0
Kataller Toyama	0–2	1–1	1–1	2–1		1–0	0–0						2–1
Fujieda MYFC	3–1		4–2	2–1						1–3	2–3	1–2	1–4
Nagano Parceiro			1–0	2–2		2–1			2–1		5–1	1–1	2–1
Renofa Yamaguchi					1–2	2–3	1–2			5–0	4–0		0–0
FC Ryukyu				1–1	1–1	1–0		0–2		4–6		0–2	6–0
SC Sagamihara		0–2		2–2	5–1		2–0				0–2		3–2
YSCC Yokohama			1–3	0–1	0–2				1–0			0–2	4–0
Machida Zelvia	2–0	1–0			2–0			1–3		1–0			1–0
J.League U-22													

Updated to match(es) played on 23 November 2015. Source: J. League data
Legend: Blue = home team win; Yellow = draw; Red = away team win.

=== Promotion/relegation playoffs ===
2015 J2/J3 Play-Offs (2015 J2・J3入れ替え戦)

Team 1	Agg.	Team 2	1st leg	2nd leg
Oita Trinita	1–3	Machida Zelvia	1–2	0-1

29 November 2015
12:30

Machida Zelvia	2–1	Oita Trinita
K. Suzuki 45+2', 72'	Report	Daniel 22'

Machida Municipal Athletic Stadium, Machida, Tokyo
Attendance: 8,629

6 December 2015
12:30

Oita Trinita	0–1	Machida Zelvia
	Report	K. Suzuki 58' (pen.)

Ōita Bank Dome, Ōita
Attendance: 14,217

Machida Zelvia was promoted to J2 League.
Oita Trinita was relegated to J3 League.

== Top scorers ==
Rank	Scorer	Club	Goals
1	(Japan) Kazuhito Kishida	Renofa Yamaguchi	32
2	(Japan) Takaki Fukumitsu	Renofa Yamaguchi	19
3	(Japan) Yatsunori Shimaya	Renofa Yamaguchi	16
4	(Japan) Tsugutoshi Oishi	Fujieda MYFC	14
5	(Japan) Koji Suzuki	Machida Zelvia	12
5	(Japan) Yuki Sato	Nagano Parceiro	12
7	(Japan) Hiroki Higuchi	SC Sagamihara	11
8	(Japan) Kyohei Maeyama	Blaublitz Akita	10
8	(Japan) Takafumi Suzuki	Machida Zelvia	10
8	(Japan) Masato Nakayama	Gainare Tottori	10
11	(Japan) Keita Tanaka	FC Ryukyu	9

Updated to games played on 23 November 2015
Source: Meiji Yasuda J3 League Stats & Data - Ranking:Goals

== Attendances ==
Pos	Team	Total	High	Low	Average	Change
1	Nagano Parceiro	94,665	8,681	3,159	4,733	+31.7%
2	Renofa Yamaguchi	87,348	8,474	1,697	4,367	+90.1%^{‡}
3	Machida Zelvia	75,312	7,803	2,005	3,766	+20.2%
4	SC Sagamihara	62,533	9,040	1,660	3,291	+5.0%
5	Kataller Toyama	56,392	4,542	1,870	2,820	−33.9%^{†}
6	Blaublitz Akita	37,955	3,233	1,237	1,998	+12.7%
7	Gainare Tottori	38,637	4,013	1,096	1,932	−37.0%
8	FC Ryukyu	28,466	8,993	673	1,498	+7.2%
9	Fukushima United	24,497	3,207	692	1,289	−2.4%
10	Grulla Morioka	24,784	3,025	635	1,239	−18.6%
11	Fujieda MYFC	20,962	1,516	618	1,103	−16.4%
12	YSCC Yokohama	17,465	1,723	461	919	−9.7%
	League total	569,016	9,040	461	2,432	+8.2%

Updated to games played on 23 November 2015
Source: J.League data
Notes:
^{†} Team played previous season in J2.
^{‡} Team played previous season in JFL.
