= 2016 J3 League =

Meiji Yasuda J3 League
- Season: 2016
- Champions: Oita Trinita
- Promoted: Oita Trinita
- Matches: 240
- Goals: 592 (2.47 per match)
- Top goalscorer: Noriaki Fujimoto (Kagoshima United FC) (15 goals)
- Highest attendance: 11,065; Ōita vs YSCC Yokohama (13 November)
- Lowest attendance: 486; Morioka vs Ryukyu (7 April)
- Average attendance: 2,957

The 2016 Meiji Yasuda J3 League (2016 明治安田生命J3リーグ) was the 20th season of the third tier in Japanese football, and the 3rd season of the professional J3 League.

== Clubs ==
Locations of the 2016 J3 League teams

To participate, a club must have held an associate membership, or have submitted an application before 30 June 2015, and then passed an inspection to obtain a participation license issued by the J.League Council. The J.League has confirmed the following clubs participating in the 2016 J3 season:

Club name	Home town	Notes
Blaublitz Akita	All cities/towns in Akita	
Cerezo Osaka U23	Osaka, Osaka	New club, ineligible for J2 promotion
Fukushima United	Fukushima	
Gainare Tottori	All cities/towns in Tottori	
Gamba Osaka U-23	Suita, Osaka, Osaka	New club, ineligible for J2 promotion
Grulla Morioka	Morioka, Iwate	
Kagoshima United	Kagoshima, Kagoshima	Promoted from 2015 JFL
Kataller Toyama	All cities/towns in Toyama	Eligible for J2 promotion
Fujieda MYFC	Fujieda, Shizuoka	
Nagano Parceiro	Nagano	Eligible for J2 promotion
FC Ryukyu	All cities/towns in Okinawa	
SC Sagamihara	Sagamihara, Kanagawa	
Tochigi SC	Tochigi, Tochigi	Relegated from 2015 J2, eligible for J2 promotion
FC Tokyo U23	Tokyo	New club, ineligible for J2 promotion
Oita Trinita	Ōita	Relegated from 2015 J2, eligible for J2 promotion
YSCC Yokohama	Yokohama, Kanagawa	

== Competition rules ==
For this season, the league is played in two rounds (home-and-away), each team playing a total of 30 matches.

Each team must have at least 3 players holding professional contracts. Also for this season, three foreign players are allowed per team, plus 1 more from the ASEAN partner country of J.League or from other AFC countries. The matchday roster will consist of 18 players, and up to 3 substitutes will be allowed in a game. The three under-23 clubs can have up to three overage players and one of them must be a goalkeeper.

=== Promotion and relegation ===
Rules for promotion to J2 are largely similar to those of the Japan Football League in recent seasons: to be promoted, a club must hold a J2 license and finish in top 2 of the league. The champions will be promoted directly, in exchange with the 22nd placed J2 club, and the runners-up will participate in the playoffs with the 21st placed J2 club. If either or both top 2 finishers are ineligible for promotion, the playoffs and/or direct exchange will not be held in accordance with the exact positions of promotion-eligible clubs. Also, if an under-23 squad finishes in either one of the top 2 or both positions, the next-placed, promotion-eligible club takes automatic promotion to J2. Another next-placed eligible club will contest the playoff if any under-23 club occupies third to fourth place or both and the J3 champion is eligible for promotion.

No relegation to the JFL is planned. Up to 2 clubs may be promoted if they are licensed by the J.League for J3 participation and finish within the top 4 of the JFL.

=== Managerial changes ===
Team	Outgoing manager	Date of separation	Manner of departure	Incoming manager	Date of announcement
Grulla Morioka	(Japan) Naoki Naruo	18 November 2015	Retired	(Japan) Akihiko Kamikawa	18 November 2015
Tochigi SC	(Japan) Yasuharu Kurata	11 December 2015	Contract expired	(Japan) Yuji Yokoyama	11 December 2015
Gainare Tottori	(Japan) Masanobu Matsunami	22 November 2015	Contract expired	(Japan) Tetsuji Hashiratani	13 December 2015
Nagano Parceiro	(Japan) Hajime Eto	1 December 2015	Contract expired	(Japan) Fumitake Miura	14 December 2015
FC Ryukyu	(Japan) Norihiro Satsukawa	31 October 2015	Contract expired	(North Korea) Kim Jong-song	14 December 2015
SC Sagamihara	(Japan) Yoshika Matsubara	3 December 2015	End of caretaker spell	(Japan) Norihiro Satsukawa	26 December 2015
Kataller Toyama	(Japan) Shigeo Sawairi (GM)	–	End of caretaker spell	(Japan) Yasutoshi Miura	26 December 2015
Oita Trinita	(Japan) Nobuaki Yanagida	7 December 2015	Resigned	(Japan) Tomohiro Katanosaka	4 January 2016
FC Tokyo U23	(Japan) Takayoshi Amma	26 July 2016	Promoted to first team coach	(Japan) Tadashi Nakamura	26 July 2016
SC Sagamihara	(Japan) Norihiro Satsukawa	18 August 2016	Resigned	(Japan) Sotaro Yasunaga	20 August 2016

== League table ==
Pos	Team	Pld	W	D	L	GF	GA	GD	Pts	Qualification or relegation
1	Oita Trinita (C, P)	30	19	4	7	50	24	+26	61	Promotion to 2017 J2 League
2	Tochigi SC	30	17	8	5	38	20	+18	59	Qualification to J2 promotion playoffs (Note: Only teams that hold a J2 license are eligible for promotion.)
3	Nagano Parceiro	30	15	7	8	33	22	+11	52	
4	Blaublitz Akita	30	14	8	8	37	26	+11	50	
5	Kagoshima United	30	15	5	10	39	29	+10	50	
6	Kataller Toyama	30	13	10	7	37	29	+8	49	
7	Fujieda MYFC	30	14	3	13	48	42	+6	45	
8	FC Ryukyu	30	12	8	10	46	46	0	44	
9	Gamba Osaka U-23	30	10	8	12	42	41	+1	38	
10	FC Tokyo U-23	30	9	9	12	32	31	+1	36	
11	SC Sagamihara	30	9	8	13	29	46	−17	35	
12	Cerezo Osaka U-23	30	8	8	14	38	47	−9	32	
13	Grulla Morioka	30	6	12	12	43	47	−4	30	
14	Fukushima United	30	7	9	14	35	44	−9	30	
15	Gainare Tottori	30	8	6	16	30	47	−17	30	
16	YSCC Yokohama	30	5	5	20	15	51	−36	20	

Updated to match(es) played on 20 November 2016. Source: 2016 MEIJI YASUDA J3 LEAGUE League table
Rules for classification: 1) Points; 2) Goal difference; 3) Goals scored; 4th) head-to-head results; 5th) disciplinary points; 6th) draw
(C) Champions; (P) Promoted

== Results ==
Home \ Away	BLA	C23	FUK	GAI	G23	GRU	KGU	KAT	MYF	PAR	RYU	SGM	TOC	T23	TRI	YSC
Blaublitz Akita		1–1	2–1	3–0	1–0	2–0	1–3	1–0	1–0	1–1	2–0	2–1	1–0	2–1	0–1	3–0
Cerezo Osaka U-23	1–2		2–2	2–2	1–2	2–0	0–2	2–3	2–1	0–0	2–1	2–2	0–3	2–1	2–1	1–1
Fukushima United	1–1	2–2		1–2	1–1	3–1	1–2	1–1	1–1	1–0	1–1	0–1	2–1	0–2	1–4	2–0
Gainare Tottori	1–1	1–2	1–3		0–4	3–3	0–1	0–1	1–3	2–0	1–0	0–1	0–1	0–1	2–4	2–1
Gamba Osaka U-23	2–2	2–1	1–0	1–2		4–1	6–1	3–0	2–0	1–1	1–4	0–1	2–3	1–1	2–2	0–0
Grulla Morioka	1–1	1–0	4–2	2–0	0–0		2–3	1–1	1–2	0–1	2–3	5–0	2–2	1–1	1–1	3–0
Kagoshima United	1–0	3–1	1–0	2–0	3–1	2–2		0–0	1–0	0–0	1–2	1–1	0–1	1–0	0–1	4–0
Kataller Toyama	0–1	1–1	2–1	4–1	2–1	1–3	2–1		2–0	2–0	1–1	1–1	0–1	0–0	0–0	1–0
Fujieda MYFC	2–1	1–0	2–0	2–5	4–0	3–2	2–0	2–1		3–2	4–2	0–1	1–1	2–1	0–2	4–0
Nagano Parceiro	1–0	1–3	2–1	0–0	4–0	0–0	1–0	0–0	2–1		2–0	2–1	1–0	0–1	1–0	3–0
FC Ryukyu	1–1	0–3	2–3	1–1	1–0	4–2	3–1	2–2	1–0	2–1		2–2	1–1	1–5	1–0	0–1
SC Sagamihara	2–2	3–1	1–0	1–0	1–2	0–0	0–4	0–1	3–1	1–2	1–3		0–2	1–0	0–3	0–1
Tochigi SC	1–0	1–0	3–1	0–0	0–2	1–1	1–0	2–0	2–0	0–1	1–0	1–1		1–1	2–1	2–0
FC Tokyo U-23	1–0	2–0	1–1	0–1	1–1	1–0	0–0	0–3	1–1	1–2	2–3	4–1	1–1		1–2	2–0
Oita Trinita	1–0	2–0	1–0	2–1	1–0	4–2	1–0	0–1	4–3	1–0	2–2	3–0	0–1	3–0		3–0
YSCC Yokohama	1–2	2–2	0–2	0–1	2–0	0–0	0–1	3–4	0–3	0–2	0–2	1–1	0–1	1–0	1–0	

Updated to match(es) played on 20 November 2016. Source: J. League data site
Legend: Blue = home team win; Yellow = draw; Red = away team win.

== Top scorers ==
Rank	Scorer	Club	Goals
1	(Japan) Noriaki Fujimoto	Kagoshima United FC	15
2	(Japan) Yusuke Goto	Oita Trinita	14
3	(Japan) Keita Tanaka	FC Ryukyu	13
4	(Japan) Yuichiro Edamoto	Fujieda MYFC	12
5	(Japan) Tsugutoshi Oishi	Tochigi SC	11
5	(South Korea) Yu In-soo	FC Tokyo U-23	11
7	(Japan) Ritsu Doan	Gamba Osaka U-23	10
7	(Japan) Kazushi Mitsuhira	Oita Trinita	10
9	(Japan) Taku Ushinohama	Grulla Morioka	9
9	(Japan) Hiroki Higuchi	Fukushima United FC	9

Updated to games played on 20 November 2016
Source: J.League Data

== Attendances ==
Pos	Team	Total	High	Low	Average	Change
1	Oita Trinita	116,563	11,065	5,408	7,771	+3.2%^{†}
2	Nagano Parceiro	75,274	10,377	3,905	5,018	+6.0%
3	Tochigi SC	73,756	8,586	2,864	4,917	−4.8%^{†}
4	SC Sagamihara	65,161	7,582	2,912	4,344	+32.0%
5	Kagoshima United	54,979	4,975	2,024	3,665	+39.7%^{‡}
6	Kataller Toyama	54,113	5,081	2,691	3,608	+27.9%
7	FC Tokyo U-23	41,957	7,653	1,375	2,797	n/a
8	Blaublitz Akita	36,371	5,371	1,339	2,425	+21.4%
9	Gamba Osaka U-23	36,021	8,038	1,066	2,401	n/a
10	Gainare Tottori	28,471	3,450	1,321	1,898	−1.8%
11	Fukushima United	25,172	3,052	1,045	1,678	+30.2%
12	FC Ryukyu	23,418	4,565	948	1,561	+4.2%
13	Fujieda MYFC	22,965	2,257	904	1,531	+38.8%
14	Cerezo Osaka U-23	22,326	4,915	713	1,488	n/a
15	Grulla Morioka	17,816	2,888	486	1,188	−4.1%
16	YSCC Yokohama	15,277	1,614	568	1,018	+10.8%
	League total	709,640	11,065	486	2,957	+21.6%

Updated to games played on 20 November 2016
Source: J. League Data
Notes:
^{†} from J2, ^{‡} from JFL
